= 1987 Wisconsin–Stevens Point Pointers football team =

American college football season

1987 Wisconsin–Stevens Point Pointers football

NAIA co-champion (forfeited) WSUC champion (forfeited)

NAIA Division II Championship, T 16–16 (forfeit) vs. Pacific Lutheran
- Conference: Wisconsin State University Conference
- Record: 0–15, 12 wins forfeited, 1 tie forfeited (0–8 WSUC, 7 wins forfeited)
- Head coach: D. J. LeRoy (6th season)
- Defensive coordinator: John Miech (3rd season)
- Home stadium: Goerke Field

1987 Wisconsin State University Conference football standings
	Conf.					Overall
Team	W		L		T	W		L		T
Wisconsin–Whitewater +	6	–	2	–	0	8	–	2	–	1
No. 25 Wisconsin–River Falls +	6	–	2	–	0	7	–	3	–	0
No. 24 Wisconsin–Eau Claire	5	–	3	–	0	6	–	4	–	0
Wisconsin–La Crosse	5	–	3	–	0	6	–	4	–	0
Wisconsin–Stout	5	–	3	–	0	6	–	5	–	0
Wisconsin–Platteville	4	–	4	–	0	6	–	5	–	0
Wisconsin–Oshkosh	3	–	5	–	0	6	–	5	–	0
Wisconsin–Superior	2	–	6	–	0	3	–	7	–	0
No. 4 Wisconsin–Stevens Point ^	0	–	8	–	0	0	–	15	–	0
+ – Conference co-champions; ^ – NAIA Division II playoff participant Wisconsin–Stevens Point finished the season with an overall record of 12–2–1 and a conference mark of 7–1, winning the WSUC title and advancing to the NAIA Division II Football National Championship playoffs, where they tied Pacific Lutheran in the title game, sharing the NAIA Division II title. In May 1988, Stevens Point forfeited its 12 wins, the one tie, and the conference and NAIA titles because of the use of two ineligible players.; Rankings from NAIA Division II poll

The 1987 Wisconsin–Stevens Point Pointers represented the University of Wisconsin–Stevens Point as a member of the Wisconsin State University Conference (WSUC) during the 1987 NAIA Division II football season. Led by sixth-year head coach D. J. LeRoy, the Pointers finished the season with an overall record of 12–2–1 and a mark of 7–1 in conference play, winning the WSUC title. Wisconsin–Stevens Point advanced to the NAIA Division II Championship playoffs, where the Pointers defeated Westmar in the first round, St. Ambrose in the quarterfinals, and Geneva in the semifinals before tying Pacific Lutheran in the title game.

In May 1988, Wisconsin–Stevens Point forfeited their twelve wins, one tie, and both the WSUC and NAIA titles because of the use of two ineligible players, wide receiver Aatron Kenney, and fullback Keith Majors. Both natives of Dallas, Kenney and Majors had each attended Cisco Junior College in Cisco, Texas for two years and then Angelo State University in San Angelo, Texas during the 1986–87 academic year, before transferring to Wisconsin–Stevens Point. An internal investigation conducted by Wisconsin–Stevens Point revealed that both players had improperly altered college transcripts and had violated National Association of Intercollegiate Athletics (NAIA) eligibility rules. LeRoy was fired by Wisconsin–Stevens Point on May 11, 1988, and was succeeded as head coach by John Miech, who had served as the team's defensive coordinator under LeRoy.

== Schedule ==
Date	Time	Opponent	Site	Result	Attendance	Source
September 5	9:00 p.m.	at Portland State*	Civic Stadium; Portland, OR	L 7–33	3,648	
September 12	7:30 p.m.	at St. Ambrose*	Brady Street Stadium; Davenport, IA	L 21–20 (forfeit)	3,500	
September 19		Wisconsin–Whitewater	Goerke Field; Stevens Point, WI	L 26–23 (forfeit)	5,086	
September 26		at Northwest Missouri State*	Bearcat Stadium; Maryville, MO	L 28–10 (forfeit)	7,000	
October 3		at Wisconsin–La Crosse	La Crosse, WI	L 23–22 (forfeit)	3,100	
October 10		Wisconsin–Eau Claire	Goerke Field; Stevens Point, WI	L 22–31	4,272	
October 17		at Wisconsin–Superior	Superior, WI	L 52–6 (forfeit)	1,496	
October 24		Wisconsin–Stout	Goerke Field; Stevens Point, WI	L 52–27 (forfeit)	1,496	
October 31		at Wisconsin–Oshkosh	Titan Stadium; Oshkosh, WI	L 52–20 (forfeit)	1,000	
November 7		Wisconsin–River Falls	Goerke Field; Stevens Point, WI	L 37–0 (forfeit)	2,969	
November 14		at Wisconsin–Platteville	Platteville, WI	L 27–7 (forfeit)	1,000	
November 21		Westmar*	Goerke Field; Stevens Point, WI (NAIA Division II First Round)	L 50–24 (forfeit)		
November 28	1:00 p.m.	at St. Ambrose*	Brady Street Stadium; Davenport, IA (NAIA Division II Quarterfinal)	L 30–14 (forfeit)		
December 5		Geneva*	Goerke Field; Stevens Point, WI (NAIA Division II Semifinal)	L 48–25 (forfeit)		
December 13	4:00 p.m.	vs. Pacific Lutheran*	Tacoma Dome; Tacoma, WA (NAIA Division II Championship)	L 16–16 (forfeit)	4,453	
*Non-conference game; All times are in Central time

== Roster ==
1987 Wisconsin–Stevens Point Pointers football team roster
Players			Coaches
Offense: Pos. / # / Name / Class; QB / 12 / Kirk Baumgartner / So	Defense: Pos. / # / Name / Class; DT / 78 / Bill Kolodziej	Special teams: Pos. / # / Name / Class	Head coach: D. J. LeRoy; Coordinators/assistant coaches: John Miech (defensive coordinator); Legend: (C) Team captain; (S) Suspended; (I) Ineligible; Injured; Redshirt
