= 1955 Stevens Point State Pointers football team =

American college football season

1955 Stevens Point Pointers football

WSCC champion
- Conference: Wisconsin State College Conference
- Record: 8–0 (6–0 WSCC)
- Head coach: John Roberts (4th season)
- Home stadium: Goerke Field

1955 Wisconsin State College Conference football standings
	Conf.					Overall
Team	W		L		T	W		L		T
Stevens Point State $	6	–	0	–	0	8	–	0	–	0
River Falls State	4	–	1	–	0	7	–	1	–	0
La Crosse State	4	–	1	–	0	4	–	4	–	1
Eau Claire State	5	–	2	–	0	5	–	3	–	0
Platteville State	3	–	2	–	0	5	–	2	–	0
Milwaukee State	2	–	3	–	0	2	–	6	–	0
Whitewater State	1	–	3	–	1	1	–	4	–	1
Stout State	0	–	4	–	1	2	–	5	–	1
Superior State	0	–	4	–	1	0	–	7	–	2
Oshkosh State	0	–	5	–	1	0	–	5	–	2
$ – Conference champion

The 1955 Stevens Point Pointers football team was an American football team that represented Wisconsin State College–Stevens Point, also known as Central State College (later renamed the University of Wisconsin–Stevens Point) as a member of the Wisconsin State College Conference (WSCC) during the 1955 college football season. In their fourth year under head coach John Roberts, the Pointers compiled a perfect 8–0 record (6–0 against WSCC opponents), won the WSCC championship, and outscored opponents by a total of 205 to 97. The only undefeated football team in school, the 1955 Stevens Point team was inducted into the University of Wisconsin-Stevens Point Athletics Hall of Fame in 2015.

Five Stevens Point players received were selected by the WSCC coaches for the all-conference team, southern squad. The honorees were: fullback Nubs Miller; quarterback Ken Roloff; tackle Jack Crook; guard George Roman; and center Dave Hurlbut.

== Schedule ==
Date	Opponent	Site	Result	Attendance	Source
September 17	at Michigan Tech*	Houghton, MI	W 18–6		
September 24	Platteville State	Stevens Point, WI	W 7–6		
October 1	Superior State	Stevens Point, WI	W 25–6		
October 8	at Milwaukee State	Milwaukee, WI	W 35–27		
October 15	Whitewater State^{†}	Stevens Point, WI	W 31–18		
October 22	at Oshkosh State	Oshkosh, WI	W 31–6		
October 29	at Eau Claire State	Carson Park; Eau Claire, WI	W 13–0		
November 5	St. Norbert*	Stevens Point, WI	W 45–28		
*Non-conference game; ^{†}Homecoming

== Personnel ==
=== Players ===
- John Boyme
- Arvo Britten
- Tom Brockly
- Jack Charlesworth
- Jack Crook
- George Du Puy
- Dave Hurlbut
- Carl Jurgella
- Gil Keller
- Tony Kielpinski
- Bob Marko
- Jigs Meuret
- Nubbs Miller
- Tom Nadeau
- Jerry Pinkowski
- Ed Poock
- Ken Roloff
- Jerry Scheel
- Wayne Schmidt
- Al Shuda
- Butch Sorenson
- Dick Southworth
- Dick Spindler
- Russ Stimac
- Jerry Vance
- John Wurtzel
- Dud Zimmerman
- Wayne Johnson
- Larry Grisham
- George Roman
- Phil Kampke
- Pete Caylor
- Terry Pease
- Dave Jersey
- Ted Ludeman
- Herb Schotz
- Fred Kestly
- Bob Bostad
- John Smith
- Fran Roman
- Jim Fleig
- Phil Cole
- Don Nice

=== Coaches ===
- John Roberts, head coach
- Hale Quandt, assistant coach
- P. Reuschlein, assistant coach
- C. Abramson, assistant coach
