= D. J. LeRoy =

American football player and coach (born 1957)

Biographical details
- Born: February 24, 1957 (age 69)

Playing career
- 1975–1978: Wisconsin–Eau Claire
- Position: Running back

Coaching career (HC unless noted)
- 1980: Bemidji State (GA)
- 1981: Wisconsin–Stevens Point (RB)
- 1982–1987: Wisconsin–Stevens Point
- 1989–1999: Coe

Head coaching record
- Overall: 109–66–1
- Tournaments: 0–3 (NCAA D-III playoffs); 0–4 (NAIA D-II playoffs)

Accomplishments and honors

Championships
- 1 WSUC (1986); 4 MWC (1990–1991, 1993–1994); 5 MCAC South Division (1990–1991, 1993–1994, 1996)

D. J. LeRoy (born February 24, 1957) is an American former football coach. He served as the head football coach at the University of Wisconsin–Stevens Point from 1982 to 1987 and at Coe College from 1989 to 1999. LeRoy's 1987 Wisconsin–Stevens Point team won a share of the NAIA Division II Football National Championship after tying Pacific Lutheran in the title game. When it came to light the following spring that Wisconsin–Stevens Point had used ineligible players that season, the school forfeited its share of the national title and dismissed LeRoy from his position.

A native of Sturgeon Bay, Wisconsin, LeRoy played college football as a running back at the University of Wisconsin–Eau Claire, from which he graduated in 1979. He left Wisconsin–Eau Claire as the program's all-time leading rusher with 2,666 yards. LeRoy signed as a free agent in 1980 with the New York Giants of the National Football League (NFL), but was released before making the team's regular season roster. He earned a master's degree in 1981 from Bemidji State University in Bemidji, Minnesota, where he was a graduate assistant for the football team, working with the linebackers and defensive backs. LeRoy joined the coaching staff at Wisconsin–Stevens Point in 1981 as running backs coach and succeeded Ron Steiner as head coach in 1982.

== Head coaching record ==
Year	Team	Overall	Conference	Standing	Bowl/playoffs
Wisconsin–Stevens Point Pointers (Wisconsin State University Conference) (1982–1987)
1982	Wisconsin–Stevens Point	4–6	3–5	T–6th	
1983	Wisconsin–Stevens Point	4–6	2–6	T–7th	
1984	Wisconsin–Stevens Point	6–5	4–4	T–5th	
1985	Wisconsin–Stevens Point	8–2–1	5–2–1	3rd	
1986	Wisconsin–Stevens Point	8–4	7–1	T–1st	L NCAA Division III First Round
1987	Wisconsin–Stevens Point	0–15 (Note: Wisconsin–Stevens Point finished the 1987 with an overall record of 12–2–1 and a mark of 7–1 in conference play, winning the Wisconsin State University Conference (WSUC) title. They advanced to the NAIA Division II Championship playoffs, where they tied Pacific Lutheran in the title game. In May 1988, Wisconsin–Stevens Point forfeited its 12 wins, the one tie, and the conference and NAIA titles because of the use of two ineligible players.)	0–8	9th	L (forfeited) NAIA Division II Football National Championship
Wisconsin–Stevens Point:		30–38–1	21–26–1		
Coe Kohawks (Midwest Conference) (1989–1996)
1989	Coe	6–3	5–2	2nd (South)	
1990	Coe	8–2	6–0	1st (South)	
1991	Coe	9–2	5–0	1st (South)	L NCAA Division III First Round
1992	Coe	8–1	4–1	2nd (South)	
1993	Coe	10–1	5–0	1st (South)	L NCAA Division III First Round
1994	Coe	8–2	4–1	T–1st (South)	
1995	Coe	7–2	4–1	2nd (South)	
1996	Coe	6–3	4–1	T–1st (South)	
Coe Kohawks (Iowa Intercollegiate Athletic Conference) (1997–1999)
1997	Coe	8–1	0–0	NA	
1998	Coe	5–5	5–5	T–5th	
1999	Coe	4–6	4–6	T–6th	
Coe:		79–28	46–17		
Total:		109–66–1			
National championship Conference title Conference division title or championship game berth
