= Awrey =

Awrey is a surname. Notable people with the name include:

- Don Awrey (born 1943), Canadian professional hockey defenceman
- Nicholas Awrey (1851–1897), Ontario farmer and political figure
- Randy Awrey (born April 27, 1956) is an American football coach and player

== See also ==
- Awrey Island, uninhabited island located in the Hudson Bay Nunavut, Canada
