= Randy Awrey =

American football player and coach, track and field coach

Current position
- Title: Head coach (football)
- Team: Perquimans County HS (NC)

Biographical details
- Born: April 27, 1956 (age 70); Iron Mountain, Michigan, U.S.

Playing career

Football
- 1974–1977: Northern Michigan
- Positions: Running back, cornerback

Coaching career (HC unless noted)

Football
- 1981: Westwood HS (MI) (freshmen)
- 1982–1985: Michigan Tech (DB)
- 1986–1989: St. Lawrence (DC)
- 1990–1993: Kentucky Wesleyan
- 1994–1998: Lakeland
- 1999–2007: Saginaw Valley State
- 2008–2011: Northern Michigan (DC)
- 2012: Marietta (DC)
- 2013–2017: Concordia (IL)
- 2018–present: Perquimans County HS (NC)

Track and field
- 1982–1986: Michigan Tech
- 1986–1990: St. Lawrence

Head coaching record
- Overall: 134–106–1 (college football)
- Tournaments: Football; 4–5 (NCAA D-II playoffs)

Accomplishments and honors

Championships
- Football; 2 IBFC (1996–1997); 2 GLIAC (2000, 2003)

Awards
- Football; 2× IBFC Coach of the Year (1995–1996); GLIAC Coach of the Year (2003)

Randy Awrey (born April 27, 1956) is an American football coach, former player, and former track and field coach. He is the head football coach at Perquimans County High School in Hertford, North Carolina, a position he has held since 2018. Awrey served as the head football coach at Kentucky Wesleyan College (1990–1994), Lakeland College in Sheboygan, Wisconsin (1994–1998), Saginaw Valley State University (1999–2007), and Concordia University Chicago (2013–2017), compiling a career college football coaching record of 134–106–1. He was also the head track and field coach at Michigan Technological University from 1982 to 1986 and St. Lawrence University from 1986 to 1990.

Awrey played college football as a running back at Northern Michigan University from 1974 to 1977 and was a member of the 1975 Northern Michigan Wildcats football team, which won the NCAA Division II Football Championship title. He has been inducted in the athletics hall of fame at Northern Michigan, St. Lawrence, Lakeland, and Saginaw Valley State.

== Early years and playing career ==
Awrey was born and raised in Iron Mountain, Michigan in the Upper Peninsula of Michigan. He was a childhood friend of Steve Mariucci, with whom he played college football at Northern Michigan University. Awrey played for the Northern Michigan Wildcats football team as a cornerback during his freshman year before switching to running back. As a sophomore on the 1975 Northern Michigan team, he scored the winning touchdown on a 67-yard run in the second half of the Camellia Bowl, earning MVP honors for the game as the Wildcats captured the NCAA Division II Football Championship title over the Western Kentucky Hilltoppers. As a senior, Awrey earned honorable mention on the 1977 Little All-America college football team by the Associated Press. He finished his career for the Wildcats with 2,096 rushing yards, 26 touchdowns, and 45 receptions for 487 yards receiving. He graduated in 1978 from Northern Michigan with degrees in criminal justice, business administration, and physical education and health.

== Coaching career ==
In 1981, Awrey coached the freshman football team at Westwood High School in Ishpeming Township, Michigan.

In February 1990, Awrey was hired as the head football coach at Kentucky Wesleyan College in Owensboro, Kentucky, succeeding Billy Mitchell, who had been fired the previous November. He resigned from his post at Kentucky Wesleyan in 1993 after leading the Panthers to a record of 11–29 in four seasons. His 1993 squad went 6–4, achieving the program's first winning season since the school reinstituted the sport in 1983 following a 50-year hiatus.

Awrey moved on to Lakeland College—now known as Lakeland University—in Plymouth, Wisconsin, where he was introduced as the school's new head football coach in February 1994. After a 4–6 campaign during his first year at Lakeland in 1994, Awrey's Muskies improved to 6–3–1 overall in 1995 with a mark of 4–2 in Illini–Badger Football Conference (IBFC) play, and he was named IBFC Coach of the Year. In 1996, Lakeland improved again to 8–2, winning the IBFC championship as Awrey repeated as the conference's coach of the year. The Muskies won a second consecutive IBFC title in 1997 with a perfect 10–0 season. Awkrey resigned after the 1998 season to become the head football coach at Saginaw Valley State University in University Center, Michigan. He finished his five-year tenure at Lakeland with a record of 35–14–1 and the best winning percentage (.700) of any head coach in program history.

Awrey was the head football coach at Saginaw Valley State for nine seasons, from 1999 to 2007, compiling a record of 76–27. He has the highest winning percentage (.738) of any head coach Saginaw Valley State football history.

== Honors ==
Awrey was inducted into the athletic hall of fame at Northern Michigan in 1998 and at Saginaw Valley State in 2022.

== Head coaching record ==
=== College football ===
Year	Team	Overall	Conference	Standing	Bowl/playoffs	AFCA^{#}
Kentucky Wesleyan Panthers (NCAA Division III independent) (1990–1992)
1990	Kentucky Wesleyan	0–10				
1991	Kentucky Wesleyan	2–8				
1992	Kentucky Wesleyan	3–7				
Kentucky Wesleyan Panthers (NCAA Division II independent) (1993)
1993	Kentucky Wesleyan	6–4				
Kentucky Wesleyan:		11–29				
Lakeland Muskies (Illini-Badger Football Conference) (1994–1998)
1994	Lakeland	4–6	2–4	T–3rd		
1995	Lakeland	6–3–1	4–2	T–2nd		
1996	Lakeland	8–2	5–0	1st		
1997	Lakeland	10–0	5–0	1st		
1998	Lakeland	7–3	4–3	4th		
Lakeland:		35–14–1	20–9			
Saginaw Valley State Cardinals (Great Lakes Intercollegiate Athletic Conference) (1999–2007)
1999	Saginaw Valley State	4–6	4–5			
2000	Saginaw Valley State	9–3	9–1	T–1st	L NCAA Division II First Round	4 (Northeast)
2001	Saginaw Valley State	11–2	9–1	2nd	L NCAA Division II Quarterfinal	9
2002	Saginaw Valley State	9–3	8–2	T–2nd	L NCAA Division II First Round	15
2003	Saginaw Valley State	12–1	10–0	1st	L NCAA Division II Quarterfinal	1
2004	Saginaw Valley State	7–3	7–3	4th		25
2005	Saginaw Valley State	11–2	9–1	2nd	L NCAA Division II Quarterfinal	3
2006	Saginaw Valley State	6–4	6–4	T–4th		
2007	Saginaw Valley State	7–3	7–3	T–2nd		
Saginaw Valley State:		76–27	69–20			
Concordia Cougars (Northern Athletics Collegiate Conference) (2013–2017)
2013	Concordia	2–8	1–5	6th		
2014	Concordia	1–8	1–5	T–5th		
2015	Concordia	2–8	0–6	7th		
2016	Concordia	4–6	2–4	5th		
2017	Concordia	3–6	1–5	T–5th		
Concordia:		12–36	5–25			
Total:		134–106–1				
National championship Conference title Conference division title or championship game berth
