= Lee Weigel =

American football player (born 1963)

No. 25
- Position: Running back

Personal information
- Born: November 15, 1963 (age 62); Marshfield, Wisconsin, U.S.
- Listed height: 5 ft 11 in (1.80 m)
- Listed weight: 220 lb (100 kg)

Career information
- High school: Marshfield
- College: Wisconsin–Eau Claire (1982–1985)
- NFL draft: 1986: undrafted

Career history
- Dallas Cowboys (1986)*; Green Bay Packers (1987)
- * Offseason or practice squad member only

Career NFL statistics
- Rushing yards: 26
- Rushing average: 2.6
- Receptions: 1
- Receiving yards: 17
- Stats at Pro Football Reference

Lee Elmer Weigel (born November 15, 1963) is an American former professional football player who was a running back in the National Football League (NFL). He played college football for the Wisconsin–Eau Claire Blugolds and later had stints in the NFL with the Dallas Cowboys and Green Bay Packers. He appeared in two games for the Packers as one of the replacement players during the 1987 NFL strike.

== Early life ==
Weigel was born on November 15, 1963, in Marshfield, Wisconsin. He grew up on the family farm and was a fan of the Green Bay Packers; he described Eddie Lee Ivery, his favorite player, as his inspiration for playing running back. He attended Marshfield High School and participated on the football and track and field teams. As a senior in football, he was named honorable mention all-conference after running for 455 yards on 90 carries (a 5.0 average) in addition to recording 13 receptions for 161 yards.

== College career ==
Weigel began attending the University of Wisconsin–Eau Claire in 1982 and lettered on for their Blugold football team all four years he spent at the school. In his first start as a freshman, he totaled 204 rushing yards and scored two touchdowns. He missed three games that season due to a knee injury but finished first in the conference with 129 rushing yards per game. The following season, he helped the Blugolds win the conference championship, running for 279 yards and two touchdowns in the title game. He was named all-district, first-team All-Wisconsin State University Conference (WSUC) and ended the year as Wisconsin–Eau Claire's leading rusher with 1,263 yards on 226 carries (a 5.6 average).

As a junior in 1984, Weigel was named first-team All-WSUC and first-team National Association of Intercollegiate Athletics (NAIA) Division II All-American after rushing for 1,030 yards and 12 touchdowns despite being limited by injury. Weigel ran 307 times for 1,172 yards and 13 touchdowns as a senior in 1985, being named first-team all-conference and becoming the first two-time All-American in school history as a repeat first-team NAIA selection; he was named the team's most valuable player, broke the WSCU career rushing record and also set the career Blugold scoring record. He ended his collegiate career with 4,015 yards, a state-record 944 rush attempts, 39 touchdowns, 21 100-yard games and three 200-yard games as he helped Wisconsin–Eau Claire compile a record of 24–11–1 in games he played.

== Professional career ==
Weigel ran a 4.54 second 40-yard dash but despite his production in college, went unselected in the 1986 NFL draft. He afterwards signed with the Dallas Cowboys as an undrafted free agent. He scored a touchdown and ran four times for 20 yards in a scrimmage against the Los Angeles Raiders. He was released on July 24, 1986.

Weigel tried out with the Miami Dolphins in April 1987. He worked as an assistant coach at Wisconsin–Eau Claire working with the running backs until the National Football League Players Association went on strike. He and Kevin Fitzgerald, another assistant, called Packers executive Tom Braatz and were able to receive a tryout. The tryout was successful and both were signed as replacement players. He missed the first strike game, a win over the Minnesota Vikings, but appeared in the last two, against the Detroit Lions and Philadelphia Eagles, and recorded 10 rushes for 26 yards and one reception for 17 yards. He was released at the end of the strike and, although he later had tryouts in the Canadian Football League (CFL), never played professionally again.

== Later life ==
Weigel worked in the concrete business after his football career. He also coached at Marshfield High School as an assistant for 10 years, helping them win three state championships. Weigel finished his coaching career with a two-year stint at Memorial High School in Eau Claire from 2006 to 2007.

Weigel and his wife, Julie, had two children as of 2008.
