= Rob Erickson =

American football coach (born c. 1977)

Current position
- Title: Head coach
- Team: Wisconsin–Eau Claire
- Conference: WIAC
- Record: 7–23

Biographical details
- Born: c. 1977 (age 48–49); Stevens Point, Wisconsin, U.S.
- Education: University of Wisconsin–Stevens Point (2003, 2006)

Playing career
- 1996–1999: Wisconsin–Platteville
- Position: Defensive back

Coaching career (HC unless noted)
- 2000–2001: Stevens Point HS (WI) (DC)
- 2002: Wisconsin–Platteville (DB)
- 2003–2004: Wisconsin–Stevens Point (DC/DB)
- 2005–2007: Aurora (DC)
- 2008–2014: Wisconsin–Platteville (DC)
- 2015–2019: Wisconsin–Whitewater (DC/DB)
- 2020–2022: South Dakota State (ST/CB)
- 2023–present: Wisconsin–Eau Claire

Head coaching record
- Overall: 7–23

Rob Erickson (born c. 1977) is an American college football coach. He is the head football coach for the University of Wisconsin–Eau Claire, a position he has held since 2023. He also coached for Stevens Point Area Senior High School, Wisconsin–Platteville, Wisconsin–Stevens Point, Aurora, Wisconsin–Whitewater, and South Dakota State. He played college football for Wisconsin–Platteville as a defensive back.

== Head coaching record ==
Year	Team	Overall	Conference	Standing	Bowl/playoffs
Wisconsin–Eau Claire Blugolds (Wisconsin Intercollegiate Athletic Conference) (2023–present)
2023	Wisconsin–Eau Claire	2–8	1–6	7th	
2024	Wisconsin–Eau Claire	2–8	1–6	7th	
2025	Wisconsin–Eau Claire	3–7	0–7	8th	
2026	Wisconsin–Eau Claire	0–0	0–0		
Wisconsin–Eau Claire:		7–23	2–19		
Total:		7–23			
