= Greg Polnasek =

American football coach (born c. 1957)

Biographical details
- Born: c. 1957 (age 68–69); Union Grove, Wisconsin, U.S.
- Education: University of Wisconsin–Eau Claire (1979); Ohio State University (1980); Bowling Green State University (1981)

Playing career

Football
- 1975–1978: Wisconsin–Eau Claire
- Position: Defensive back

Coaching career (HC unless noted)

Football
- 1980–1982: Bowling Green (assistant)
- 1983–1987: Albion (DC/RC)
- 1988–1991: Illinois State (DL)
- 1989–1991: Illinois State (LB)
- 1992–1995: Wisconsin–Eau Claire
- 1996: Colorado College (DC)
- 1997–2002: Colorado College
- 2003 (spring): Maryville (TN) (AHC/OL/RC)
- 2003–2008: Albion (DC)
- 2009–2018: Albion (ST/OLB)

Golf
- 1983–1988: Albion

Tennis
- 1984–1987: Albion

Administrative career (AD unless noted)
- ?: Albion (assoc. AD)

Head coaching record
- Overall: 27–67 (football); 25–9 (tennis)

Gregory Polnasek (born c. 1957) is an American former college football coach. He was the head football coach for his alma mater, the University of Wisconsin–Eau Claire, from 1992 to 1995 and Colorado College from 1997 to 2002. He also coached for Bowling Green, Albion, Illinois State, and Maryville (TN). He played college football for Wisconsin–Eau Claire as a defensive back.

== Head coaching record ==
=== Football ===
Year	Team	Overall	Conference	Standing	Bowl/playoffs
Wisconsin–Eau Claire Blugolds (Wisconsin State University Conference) (1992–1995)
1992	Wisconsin–Eau Claire	5–5	3–4	6th	
1993	Wisconsin–Eau Claire	4–6	3–4	T–4th	
1994	Wisconsin–Eau Claire	2–8	1–6	T–7th	
1995	Wisconsin–Eau Claire	1–9	0–7	8th	
Wisconsin–Eau Claire:		12–28	7–21		
Colorado College Tigers (NCAA Division III independent) (1997–2002)
1997	Colorado College	3–6			
1998	Colorado College	3–6			
1999	Colorado College	2–7			
2000	Colorado College	3–6			
2001	Colorado College	3–6			
2002	Colorado College	1–8			
Colorado College:		15–39			
Total:		27–67			
