= Carl Eggebrecht =

American sports coach and administrator (1893–1958)

Biographical details
- Born: November 9, 1893; Wausau, Wisconsin, U.S.
- Died: July 1, 1958 (aged 64); Madison, Wisconsin, U.S.

Playing career

Football
- 1914: Beloit
- 1915: River Falls Normal
- 1917: Springfield

Basketball
- 1914–1915: Beloit
- 1915–1916: River Falls Normal
- 1917–1920: Springfield
- Positions: Fullback (football); Center (basketball)

Coaching career (HC unless noted)

Football
- 1920: Lombard
- 1921–1923: Heidelberg
- 1924–1926: Marshall HS (MN)
- 1927–1928: Stevens Point
- 1935–1936: Midland

Basketball
- 1921–1924: Heidelberg
- 1924–1926: Marshall HS (MN)
- 1927–1929: Stevens Point
- 1935–1937: Midland

Baseball
- 1921: Lombard

Administrative career (AD unless noted)
- 1921–1923: Heidelberg
- 1924–1927: Marshall HS (MN)
- 1927–1929: Stevens Point
- 1935–1937: Midland

Head coaching record
- Overall: 25–28–5 (college football); 19–32 (college basketball, excluding Midland)

Accomplishments and honors

Championships
- Football; 1 WSTCC (1928)

Carl A. "Eggs" Eggebrecht (November 9, 1893 – July 1, 1958) was an American football and basketball coach and college athletics administrator. He served as the head football coach at Lombard College in Galesburg, Illinois in 1920, Heidelberg College—now known as Heidelberg University—in Tiffin, Ohio from 1921 to 1923, Central State Teachers College—now known as the University of Wisconsin–Stevens Point—in Stevens Point, Wisconsin from 1927 to 1928, and Midland College—now known as Midland University—in Fremont, Nebraska from 1935 to 1936, compiling a career college football coaching record of 25–28–5.

== Early life and playing career ==
Eggebrecht was born on November 9, 1893, in Wausau, Wisconsin. There he graduated from Wausau High School, and was a member of the football, basketball, and track teams.

Eggebrecht first attended Beloit College in Beloit, Wisconsin, where he played football and basketball. He then moved on to River Falls Normal School—now known as the University of Wisconsin–River Falls—where he was a varsity football and basketball team member before graduating in 1916. He played for the football team in the fall of 1915 and the basketball team that winter. Both squads won the Inter-Normal Athletic Conference of Wisconsin title in their respective sports.

Eggebrecht spent the 1916–17 academic year in Chippewa Falls, Wisconsin as a grade school principal. He resigned from that position in 1917 to attend Springfield College in Springfield, Massachusetts. Eggebrecht played as a fullback on Springfield's football team that fall. He also played as a center on Springfield’s basketball team and was elected team captain for the 1918–19 season.

== Coaching career ==
Eggebrecht began his coaching career at the college level in 1920, when he was hired as physical director and athletic coach at Lombard College in Galesburg, Illinois.

Eggebrecht moved to Marshall High School in Minneapolis, Minnesota, in 1924, where he coached football and baseball for three seasons and basketball for two. He resigned from his post at Marshall High School in the summer of 1927 and was hired as coach and athletic director at Stevens Point Normal School—now known as the University of Wisconsin–Stevens Point. In June 1935, Eggebrecht was appointed the athletic director at Midland College—now known as Midland University—in Fremont, Nebraska.

== Late life and death ==
Eggebrecht later worked as an automobile dealer in Wausau. He died on July 1, 1958, at a hospital in Madison, Wisconsin.

== Head coaching record ==
=== College football ===
Year	Team	Overall	Conference	Standing	Bowl/playoffs
Lombard Olive (Illinois Intercollegiate Athletic Conference) (1920)
1920	Lombard	7–1	5–1		
Lombard:		7–1	5–1		
Heidelberg (Ohio Athletic Conference) (1921–1923)
1921	Heidelberg	0–7–1	0–7	19th	
1922	Heidelberg	1–7	1–6	T–18th	
1923	Heidelberg	3–5	0–5	18th	
Heidelberg:		4–19–1	1–18		
Stevens Point Pointers (Wisconsin State Teachers College Conference) (1927–1928)
1927	Stevens Point	2–3–1	1–3	T–8th	
1928	Stevens Point	5–0–1	3–0–1	T–1st	
Stevens Point:		7–3–2	4–3–1		
Midland Warriors (Nebraska College Athletic Conference) (1935–1936)
1935	Midland	2–2–3	1–2–1	4th	
1936	Midland	5–3	2–2	3rd	
Midland:		7–5–3	3–4–1		
Total:		25–28–5			
National championship Conference title Conference division title or championship game berth
