= Eddie Kotal =

American football player, coach, and scout (1902–1973)

Biographical details
- Born: September 1, 1902; Chicago, Illinois, U.S.
- Died: January 23, 1973 (aged 70); Los Angeles, California, U.S.

Playing career

Football
- 1922–1925: Lawrence
- 1925–1929: Green Bay Packers
- Positions: Quarterback, halfback

Coaching career (HC unless noted)

Football
- 1930: Lawrence
- 1931–1941: Stevens Point
- 1942–1945: Green Bay Packers (backfield)
- ?: Los Angeles Rams (assistant)

Basketball
- 1930–1942: Stevens Point

Track
- ?: Stevens Point

Boxing
- ?: Stevens Point

Administrative career (AD unless noted)
- 1946–?: Los Angeles Rams (head scout)

Head coaching record
- Overall: 40–41–9 (football); 133–49 (basketball)

Accomplishments and honors

Championships
- Football; 1 NFL (1929); 1 WSTCC (1932); 3 1 WSTCC Southern Division (1934, 1936)

Edward Louis Kotal (September 1, 1902 – January 27, 1973) was an American football player, coach, and scout. He played college football at Lawrence University in Appleton, Wisconsin and professionally with the Green Bay Packers of the National Football League (NFL). Kotal served as the head football coach at Lawrence in 1930 and at Central State Teachers College—now known as the University of Wisconsin–Stevens Point—from 1931 to 1941, compiling a career college football coaching record of 40–41–9. He also coached basketball, track and field, and boxing at Stevens Point before returning to the NFL in 1942 as an assistant coach for the Packers and later as a scout and assistant coach for the Los Angeles Rams.

== Early life and playing career ==
Kotal was on September 1, 1902, in Chicago, Illinois. He played college football at Lawrence University.

Kotal played in the National Football League (NFL) with the Green Bay Packers for five seasons. He was a member of the 1929 NFL Champion Packers.

== Coaching career ==
Kotal coached football, basketball, track and field, and boxing at the University of Wisconsin–Stevens Point. He led teams to conference championships in all four sports and is an inductee in the university's Athletic Hall of Fame.

In 1942, Kotal returned to the Green Bay Packers organization as a backfield coach and scout before becoming the chief scout for the Los Angeles Rams in 1946. In subsequent years, Kotal also assumed coaching responsibilities for the Rams as well.

Kotal has been described as the first key pioneer of scouting. He was described by one general manager as “the modern-day Ulysses, a man in quest of something more rare than the American buffalo: a college football player who can make the jump into the National Football League.”

In 2022, Kotal was named a semifinalist for the seniors ballot of the Pro Football Hall of Fame, but he was not selected.

== Head coaching record ==
=== Football ===
Year	Team	Overall	Conference	Standing	Bowl/playoffs
Lawrence Vikings (Midwest Conference) (1930)
1930	Lawrence	3–5	2–2	T–5th	
Lawrence:		3–5	2–2		
Stevens Point Pointers (Wisconsin State Teachers College Conference) (1931–1941)
1931	Stevens Point	1–6–1	0–5–1	9th	
1932	Stevens Point	2–5	2–3	7th	
1933	Stevens Point	7–0–1	4–0–1	1st	
1934	Stevens Point	7–1	4–0	1st (Southern)	
1935	Stevens Point	2–5	0–4	5th (Southern)	
1936	Stevens Point	3–3–1	2–1–1	1st (Southern)	
1937	Stevens Point	2–3–2	1–2–1	T–3rd (Southern)	
1938	Stevens Point	3–1–3		(Southern)	
1939	Stevens Point	2–6	1–3	4th (Southern)	
1940	Stevens Point	5–2–1	3–1	2nd (Southern)	
1941	Stevens Point	3–4	2–2	3rd (Southern)	
Stevens Point:		37–36–9			
Total:		40–41–9			
National championship Conference title Conference division title or championship game berth
