= John Roberts (American football) =

American football player and sports coach (1920–2012)

Biographical details
- Born: April 20, 1920; Adair, Iowa, U.S.
- Died: December 16, 2012 (aged 92); Stevens Point, Wisconsin, U.S.

Playing career

Football
- 1940–1942: Wisconsin

Wrestling
- 1940–1942: Wisconsin

Coaching career (HC unless noted)

Football
- 1946–1951: Stevens Point HS (WI)
- 1952–1956: Stevens Point State

Wrestling
- 1952–1957: Stevens Point State

Head coaching record
- Overall: 29–10–1 (college football)

Accomplishments and honors

Championships
- Football; 1 WSCC (1955)

John Evan Roberts (April 20, 1920 – December 16, 2012) was an American football, wrestling and track coach. He served as the head football coach at the University of Wisconsin–Stevens Point from 1956 to 1952, compiling a record of 29–10–1.

As a collegiate athlete, Roberts played college football for the Wisconsin Badgers football team from 1940 to 1942. He was also national runner-up wrestler in 1941 for the Badgers.

== Head coaching record ==
=== College football ===
| Year | Team | Overall | Conference | Standing | Bowl/playoffs |
|---|---|---|---|---|---|
Stevens Point State Pointers (Wisconsin State College Conference) (1952–1956)
| 1952 | Stevens Point State | 7–1 | 5–1 | 3rd | |
| 1953 | Stevens Point State | 5–3 | 4–2 | 4th | |
| 1954 | Stevens Point State | 5–2–1 | 4–2 | 4th | |
| 1955 | Stevens Point State | 8–0 | 6–0 | 1st | |
| 1956 | Stevens Point State | 4–4 | 3–3 | 4th | |
| Stevens Point State: | | 29–10–1 | 22–8 | | |
| Total: | | 29–10–1 | | | |
National championship Conference title Conference division title or championship game berth
