= Luke Venne =

American football coach (born c. 1979)

Current position
- Title: Head coach
- Team: Wisconsin–Stevens Point
- Conference: WIAC
- Record: 7–33

Biographical details
- Born: c. 1979 (age 46–47); Oconomowoc, Wisconsin, U.S.
- Education: University of Wisconsin–Oshkosh (2002, 2013)

Playing career
- 1998–2001: Wisconsin–Oshkosh
- Position: Offensive tackle

Coaching career (HC unless noted)
- 2002–2016: Wisconsin–Oshkosh (OL)
- 2017–2021: Wisconsin–Oshkosh (OC)
- 2022–present: Wisconsin–Stevens Point

Head coaching record
- Overall: 7–33

Luke Venne (born c. 1979) is an American college football coach. He is the head football coach for the University of Wisconsin–Stevens Point, a position he has held since 2022. He also coached for Wisconsin–Oshkosh. He played college football for Wisconsin–Oshkosh as a tackle.

== Head coaching record ==
Year	Team	Overall	Conference	Standing	Bowl/playoffs
Wisconsin–Stevens Point Pointers (Wisconsin Intercollegiate Athletic Conference) (2022–present)
2022	Wisconsin–Stevens Point	1–9	0–7	8th	
2023	Wisconsin–Stevens Point	1–9	0–7	8th	
2024	Wisconsin–Stevens Point	1–9	0–7	8th	
2025	Wisconsin–Stevens Point	4–6	1–6	7th	
2026	Wisconsin–Stevens Point	0–0	0–0		
Wisconsin–Stevens Point:		7–33	1–27		
Total:		7–33			
