= Phil Micech =

American football player (born 1961)

Profile
- Position: Defensive end

Personal information
- Born: August 11, 1961 (age 65); Milwaukee, Wisconsin
- Listed height: 6 ft 5 in (1.96 m)
- Listed weight: 265 lb (120 kg)

Career information
- College: Wisconsin–Platteville
- NFL draft: 1983: undrafted

Career history
- Racine Raiders (1985-1995); Minnesota Vikings (1987)
- Stats at Pro Football Reference

Philip John Micech (born August 11, 1961) was a defensive end for the Minnesota Vikings in the National Football League in 1987. He played at the collegiate level at the University of Wisconsin–Platteville where he now serves as the defensive line coach.

== Biography ==
Micech was born in Milwaukee, Wisconsin.

Micech was inducted into the American Football Association's Semi Pro Football Hall of Fame 2001.
