= Monte Charles =

American gridiron football player and coach (1930–1992)

Biographical details
- Born: March 27, 1930; Vicksburg, Michigan, U.S.
- Died: May 8, 1992 (aged 62); Stevens Point, Wisconsin, U.S.

Playing career
- 1948–1950: Hillsdale
- Position: Fullback

Coaching career (HC unless noted)
- 1954–1964: Southfield HS (MI)
- 1965: Northern Illinois (OC)
- 1966–1968: Platteville State
- 1969: Winnipeg Blue Bombers (assistant)
- 1970–1971: Superior State / Wisconsin–Superior
- 1972–1976: Wisconsin–Stevens Point
- 1977–1979: Missouri Southern (QB/WR)
- 1980–1983: Saskatchewan Roughriders (OC/QB)
- 1984–1985: Hamilton Tiger-Cats (head scout)
- 1987: Montreal Allouettes (assistant)
- 1988: Wisconsin–Stevens Point (vol. asst.)
- 1989–1991: Wisconsin–Stevens Point (OC)

Head coaching record
- Overall: 48–44–1 (college)

Accomplishments and honors

Championships
- 1 WSUC (1968)

Monte Blue Charles (March 27, 1930 – May 8, 1992) was an American gridiron football player and coach. He served as the head football coach at the University of Wisconsin–Platteville from 1966 to 1968, the University of Wisconsin–Superior from 1970 to 1971, and the University of Wisconsin–Stevens Point from 1972 to 1976, compiling a career college football coaching record of 48–44–1.

Charles was drafted by the Green Bay Packers in the 25th round of the 1951 NFL draft. He was appointed interim head football coach Wisconsin–Stevens Point in October 1972 after Pat O'Halloran was fired four games into the season. Charles resigned from his post at Wisconsin–Stevens Point in the spring of 1977 after he was stricken with leukemia. He died on May 8, 1992, in Stevens Point, Wisconsin, after suffering a heart attack.

== Head coaching record ==
=== College ===
Year	Team	Overall	Conference	Standing	Bowl/playoffs
Platteville State Pioneers (Wisconsin State University Conference) (1966–1968)
1966	Platteville State	4–4–1	3–4–1	5th	
1967	Platteville State	5–4	4–4	5th	
1968	Platteville State	8–1	7–1	T–1st	
Platteville State:		17–9–1	14–9–1		
Superior State / Wisconsin–Superior Yellowjackets (Wisconsin State University Conference) (1970–1971)
1970	Superior State	5–5	5–3	T–2nd	
1971	Wisconsin–Superior	6–4	6–2	3rd	
Superior State / Wisconsin–Superior:		11–9	11–5		
Wisconsin–Stevens Point Pointers (Wisconsin State University Conference) (1972–1975)
1972	Wisconsin–Stevens Point	2–4 (Note: Pat O'Halloran served as the head coach for the first four games of the season before he was fired. Charles was appointed interim head coach and led the team for the final six games. Wisconsin–Stevens Point finished the year 2–8 overall and 2–6 in conference play.)	2–4	T–6th	
1973	Wisconsin–Stevens Point	4–6	3–5	7th	
1974	Wisconsin–Stevens Point	3–7	2–6	T–6th	
1975	Wisconsin–Stevens Point	4–6	4–4	4th	
1976	Wisconsin–Stevens Point	7–3	5–3	T–4th	
Wisconsin–Stevens Point:		20–26	16–22		
Total:		48–44–1			
