= 1987 NAIA Division II football season =

American college football season

- Regular season: August–November 1987
- Postseason: November–December 1987
- National Championship: Tacoma Dome; Tacoma, WA
- Champions: Pacific Lutheran (2); Wisconsin–Stevens Point (forfeited)

The 1987 NAIA Division II football season, as part of the 1987 college football season in the United States and the 32nd season of college football sponsored by the National Association of Intercollegiate Athletics (NAIA), was the 18th season of play of the NAIA's lower division for football.

The season was played from August to November 1987 and culminated in the 1987 NAIA Division II Football National Championship, played at the Tacoma Dome near the campus of Pacific Lutheran University in Tacoma, Washington. Pacific Lutheran and Wisconsin–Stevens Point played to a tie, 16–16, and were declared co-national champions. It was Pacific Lutheran's second NAIA national title and Wisconsin–Stevens Point's first. However, the Pointers later forfeited their share of title after it was discovered they had been used two ineligible players during the season.

== Conference realignment ==
=== Conference changes ===
- This was the first season for the Mid-South Conference.

== Conference standings ==
1987 Columbia Football League standings
	Conf.					Overall
Team	W		L		T	W		L		T
Northern Division
No. 8 Central Washington * x	5	–	1	–	0	7	–	3	–	0
No. 6 Pacific Lutheran ^	4	–	1	–	1	11	–	1	–	1
No. 17 Puget Sound	4	–	2	–	0	6	–	3	–	0
Simon Fraser	4	–	2	–	0	4	–	6	–	0
Western Washington	2	–	3	–	1	4	–	3	–	2
Whitworth	1	–	5	–	0	3	–	6	–	0
Lewis & Clark	0	–	6	–	0	0	–	9	–	0
Southern Division
Oregon Tech x	5	–	1	–	0	5	–	4	–	0
No. 15 Southern Oregon *	4	–	2	–	0	7	–	4	–	0
Linfield	4	–	2	–	0	5	–	4	–	0
Pacific (OR)	3	–	2	–	1	4	–	3	–	2
Western Oregon	3	–	3	–	0	5	–	4	–	0
Willamette	1	–	4	–	1	3	–	5	–	1
Eastern Oregon	0	–	6	–	0	1	–	8	–	0
x – Division champion/co-champions; * – NAIA Division I playoff participant ^ – NAIA Division II playoff participant; Rankings from NAIA Division I poll for Central Washington, Puget Sound, and Southern Oregon and NAIA Division II poll for Pacific Lutheran

1987 Frontier Conference football standings
	Conf.					Overall
Team	W		L		T	W		L		T
No. 5 Carroll (MT) $^	5	–	0	–	0	8	–	2	–	0
Montana Tech	2	–	3	–	0	4	–	5	–	0
Rocky Mountain	0	–	4	–	0	2	–	6	–	0
$ – Conference champion; ^ – NAIA Division II playoff participant; Rankings from NAIA Division II poll

1987 Heart of America Athletic Conference football standings
	Conf.					Overall
Team	W		L		T	W		L		T
No. 2 Baker $^	6	–	0	–	0	9	–	2	–	0
No. 21 Missouri Valley	4	–	1	–	1	6	–	3	–	1
William Jewell	3	–	3	–	0	5	–	5	–	0
Tarkio	2	–	2	–	2	2	–	6	–	2
Culver–Stockton	1	–	3	–	2	3	–	5	–	2
Graceland	1	–	4	–	1	2	–	6	–	1
MidAmerica Nazarene	1	–	5	–	0	1	–	8	–	0
$ – Conference champion; ^ – NAIA Division II playoff participant; Rankings from NAIA Division II poll

1987 Illini–Badger Football Conference standings
	Conf.					Overall
Team	W		L		T	W		L		T
Concordia (IL) $	5	–	0	–	0	7	–	2	–	0
Concordia (WI)	4	–	1	–	0	6	–	3	–	0
Lakeland	3	–	2	–	0	6	–	3	–	0
Northeastern Illinois	2	–	3	–	0	2	–	7	–	0
Eureka	1	–	4	–	0	2	–	8	–	0
Principia	0	–	5	–	0	0	–	9	–	0
$ – Conference champion

1987 Kansas Collegiate Athletic Conference football standings
	Conf.					Overall
Team	W		L		T	W		L		T
No. 8 Bethany (KS) +^	8	–	1	–	0	8	–	2	–	0
No. 17 Southwestern (KS) +^	8	–	1	–	0	8	–	2	–	0
Kansas Wesleyan	7	–	2	–	0	7	–	3	–	0
Sterling	6	–	3	–	0	6	–	4	–	0
Friends	5	–	4	–	0	6	–	4	–	0
St. Mary of the Plains	3	–	6	–	0	4	–	6	–	0
Bethel (KS)	3	–	6	–	0	3	–	6	–	0
Ottawa	3	–	6	–	0	3	–	7	–	0
McPherson	1	–	8	–	0	1	–	8	–	0
Tabor	1	–	8	–	0	1	–	8	–	0
+ – Conference co-champions; ^ – NAIA Division II playoff participant; Rankings from NAIA Division II poll

1987 Nebraska Intercollegiate Athletic Conference football standings
	Conf.					Overall
Team	W		L		T	W		L		T
No. 16 Midland $^	4	–	1	–	0	7	–	3	–	0
No. 14 Dana ^	3	–	2	–	0	8	–	3	–	0
Nebraska Wesleyan	3	–	2	–	0	6	–	4	–	0
Doane	2	–	3	–	0	5	–	5	–	0
Hastings	2	–	3	–	0	4	–	5	–	0
Concordia (NE)	1	–	4	–	0	6	–	4	–	0
$ – Conference champion; ^ – NAIA Division II playoff participant; Rankings from NAIA Division II poll

1987 North Dakota College Athletic Conference football standings
	Conf.					Overall
Team	W		L		T	W		L		T
No. 1 Dickinson State $^	5	–	0	–	0	9	–	1	–	0
No. 19 Valley City State	4	–	1	–	0	6	–	3	–	0
Minot State	3	–	2	–	0	6	–	3	–	0
Jamestown	2	–	3	–	0	5	–	4	–	0
NDSCS–Wahpeton	1	–	4	–	0	4	–	4	–	0
Mayville State	0	–	5	–	0	1	–	8	–	0
$ – Conference champion; ^ – NAIA Division II playoff participant; Rankings from NAIA Division II poll

1987 South Dakota Intercollegiate Conference football standings
	Conf.					Overall
Team	W		L		T	W		L		T
Dakota Wesleyan +	4	–	1	–	0	6	–	4	–	0
Black Hills State +	4	–	1	–	0	4	–	5	–	0
Huron	3	–	2	–	0	5	–	4	–	0
South Dakota Tech	2	–	3	–	0	3	–	6	–	0
Sioux Falls	2	–	3	–	0	3	–	7	–	0
Dakota State	0	–	5	–	0	0	–	10	–	0
$ – Conference champion

1987 Texas Intercollegiate Athletic Association football standings
	Conf.					Overall
Team	W		L		T	W		L		T
Tarleton State $^	6	–	0	–	0	9	–	3	–	0
Sul Ross	2	–	2	–	2	5	–	2	–	2
McMurry	1	–	3	–	2	3	–	5	–	2
Austin	0	–	4	–	2	2	–	5	–	3
Howard Payne	0	–	0	–	0	5	–	5	–	0
$ – Conference champion; ^ – NAIA Division II playoff participant

1987 Wisconsin State University Conference football standings
	Conf.					Overall
Team	W		L		T	W		L		T
Wisconsin–Whitewater +	6	–	2	–	0	8	–	2	–	1
No. 25 Wisconsin–River Falls +	6	–	2	–	0	7	–	3	–	0
No. 24 Wisconsin–Eau Claire	5	–	3	–	0	6	–	4	–	0
Wisconsin–La Crosse	5	–	3	–	0	6	–	4	–	0
Wisconsin–Stout	5	–	3	–	0	6	–	5	–	0
Wisconsin–Platteville	4	–	4	–	0	6	–	5	–	0
Wisconsin–Oshkosh	3	–	5	–	0	6	–	5	–	0
Wisconsin–Superior	2	–	6	–	0	3	–	7	–	0
No. 4 Wisconsin–Stevens Point ^	0	–	8	–	0	0	–	15	–	0
+ – Conference co-champions; ^ – NAIA Division II playoff participant Wisconsin–Stevens Point finished the season with an overall record of 12–2–1 and a conference mark of 7–1, winning the WSUC title and advancing to the NAIA Division II Football National Championship playoffs, where they tied Pacific Lutheran in the title game, sharing the NAIA Division II title. In May 1988, Stevens Point forfeited its 12 wins, the one tie, and the conference and NAIA titles because of the use of two ineligible players.; Rankings from NAIA Division II poll

1987 NAIA Division II independents football records
	Conf.			Overall
Team	W	L	T	W		L		T
No. 3 St. Ambrose ^		–		11	–	0	–	1
No. 15 Geneva ^		–		11	–	2	–	0
No. 12 Westmar ^		–		9	–	2	–	0
No. 7 Westminster (PA) ^		–		9	–	2	–	0
No. 10 Bluffton ^		–		8	–	2	–	0
No. 13 St. Francis (IL) ^		–		8	–	3	–	0
Findlay		–		5	–	4	–	0
Waynesburg		–		5	–	4	–	0
Wilmington (OH)		–		5	–	4	–	0
Evangel		–		5	–	4	–	1
Peru State		–		5	–	5	–	0
Benedictine (KS)		–		4	–	7	–	0
Iowa Wesleyan		–		4	–	7	–	0
Northwestern (IA)		–		3	–	7	–	0
Oklahoma Panhandle State		–		2	–	7	–	0
Franklin (IN)		–		2	–	8	–	0
Azusa Pacific		–		2	–	8	–	0
Texas Lutheran		–		2	–	8	–	0
Chadron State		–		1	–	8	–	0
Tiffin		–		1	–	9	–	0
^ – NAIA Division II playoff participant; Rankings from NAIA Division II poll

== Conference champions ==
Conference	Champion	Record
Columbia	Mount Rainier Division: Central Washington; Mount Hood Division: Oregon Tech	5–1; 5–1
Frontier	Carroll (MT)	8–2
Heart of America	Baker	6–0
Illini–Badger	Concordia (IL)	5–0
Kansas	Bethany; Southwestern (KS)	8–1
Mid-South	Georgetown (KY)	8–3
Nebraska	Midland	4–1
North Dakota	Dickinson State	5–0
South Dakota	Black Hills State	4–1
Texas	Tarleton State	6–0
WSUC	Wisconsin–River Falls; Wisconsin–Whitewater	6–2

== Postseason ==
First Round; Campus sites
Westminster (PA)	24
Georgetown (KY) ‡	17
Bluffton	13
Geneva*	16
Westmar	24
Wisconsin–Stevens Point*	50
Saint Ambrose	21
St. Francis (IL)*	3
Bethany	26
Tarleton State*	38
Dana	35
Baker ‡‡	37
Dickinson State	21
Carroll (MT)* (OT)	28
Midland	21
Pacific Lutheran*	40

Quarterfinals; Campus sites
Westminster (PA)*	15
Geneva	16
Wisconsin–Stevens Point	30
Saint Ambrose*	14
Tarleton State*	12
Baker	13
Carroll (MT)*	26
Pacific Lutheran	36

Semifinals; Campus sites
Geneva	25
Wisconsin–Stevens Point*	48
Baker	14
Pacific Lutheran* (OT)	17

Championship; Tacoma, WA
Wisconsin–Stevens Point	16
Pacific Lutheran*	16

- ‡ Game played at Lexington, Kentucky
- ‡‡ Game played at Lawrence, Kansas

== See also ==
- 1987 NCAA Division I-A football season
- 1987 NCAA Division I-AA football season
- 1987 NCAA Division II football season
- 1987 NCAA Division III football season
