= Ryan Munz =

American football coach (born c. 1984)

Current position
- Title: Head coach
- Team: Wisconsin–Platteville
- Conference: WIAC
- Record: 30–14

Biographical details
- Born: c. 1984 (age 41–42); Highland, Wisconsin, U.S.
- Education: University of Wisconsin–Platteville (2006, 2008)

Playing career
- 2003–2006: Wisconsin–Platteville
- 2009: Fursty Razorbacks
- Position: Quarterback

Coaching career (HC unless noted)
- 2007–2015: Wisconsin–Platteville (OC)
- 2016–2021: Wisconsin–Platteville (assoc. HC/OC)
- 2022–present: Wisconsin–Platteville

Head coaching record
- Overall: 30–14
- Bowls: 1–0
- Tournaments: 1–2 (NCAA D-III playoffs)

Accomplishments and honors

Championships
- 1 WIAC (2024)

Ryan Munz (born c. 1984) is an American college football coach. He is the head football coach for the University of Wisconsin–Platteville, a position he has held since 2022. He was an assistant coach for Wisconsin–Platteville for fifteen years as an offensive coordinator. He played college football for Wisconsin–Platteville as a quarterback and professionally for the Fursty Razorbacks of the German Football League 2 (GFL2).

== Head coaching record ==
Year	Team	Overall	Conference	Standing	Bowl/playoffs	D3^{#}	AFCA^{°}
Wisconsin–Platteville Pioneers (Wisconsin Intercollegiate Athletic Conference) (2022–present)
2022	Wisconsin–Platteville	5–5	4–3	T–3rd			
2023	Wisconsin–Platteville	7–4	5–3	T–3rd	W Isthmus		
2024	Wisconsin–Platteville	9–2	6–1	1st	L NCAA Division III Second Round	8	9
2025	Wisconsin–Platteville	9–3	5–2	T–2nd	L NCAA Division III Third Round	10	11
2026	Wisconsin–Platteville	0–0	0–0				
Wisconsin–Platteville:		30–14	20–9				
Total:		30–14					
National championship Conference title Conference division title or championship game berth
