= Erwin C. Gerber =

American football player and coach (1894–1978)

Biographical details
- Born: October 28, 1894; Milwaukee, Wisconsin, U.S.
- Died: June 3, 1978 (aged 83); Milwaukee, Wisconsin, U.S.

Playing career

Football
- 1921–1922: La Crosse Normal
- 1923–1924: Wisconsin

Coaching career (HC unless noted)

Football
- 1925–1927: Eau Claire Normal/State

Basketball
- 1925–1928: Eau Claire Normal/State

Administrative career (AD unless noted)
- 1925–1928: Eau Claire Normal/State
- 1928–?: Wayland Academy (WI)

Head coaching record
- Overall: 8–7–3 (football)

Erwin Charles Gerber (October 28, 1894 – June 3, 1978) was an American college football and college basketball coach and athletics administrator. He served as the head football coach at Eau Claire State Teachers College—now known as the University of Wisconsin–Eau Claire—from 1925 to 1927. Gerber was also the athletic director and head basketball coach at Eau Claire State from 1925 to 1928.

Gerber was born on October 28, 1894, in Milwaukee. He attended Wayland Academy in Beaver Dam, Wisconsin, where he competed in football, basketball, baseball, and track and field. Gerber left Eau Claire State in 1928 to return to Wayland Academy as athletic director and coach of all sports.

== Head coaching record ==
=== Football ===
Year	Team	Overall	Conference	Standing	Bowl/playoffs
Eau Claire Normal/State Blugolds (Wisconsin Normal Athletic Conference / Wisconsin State Teachers College Conference) (1925–1927)
1925	Eau Claire Normal	4–2–1	3–1	3rd	
1926	Eau Claire State	1–3–2	0–2–2	8th	
1927	Eau Claire State	3–2	2–2	T–5th	
Eau Claire Normal/State:		8–7–3	5–5–2		
Total:		8–7–3			
