= John Miech =

American football coach (born c. 1953)

Biographical details
- Born: c. 1953 (age 72–73)
- Education: University of Wisconsin–Stevens Point (1975); Stephen F. Austin State University (1979)

Playing career
- 1971–1974: Wisconsin–Stevens Point
- Position: Offensive lineman

Coaching career (HC unless noted)
- 1975–1977: Wisconsin–Stevens Point (assistant)
- 1978: Stephen F. Austin (GA)
- 1979–1981: Whitnall HS (WI)
- 1982–1984: Jefferson HS (WI)
- 1985–1987: Wisconsin–Stevens Point (DC)
- 1988–2011: Wisconsin–Stevens Point
- 2012: Wisconsin–Whitewater (WR)
- 2013–2014: Wisconsin–Whitewater (LB)
- 2015: Lock Haven (AHC/LB)

Head coaching record
- Overall: 156–84–2 (college)
- Tournaments: 0–1 (NAIA D-II playoffs); 1–3 (NCAA D-III playoffs)

Accomplishments and honors

Championships
- 4 WIAC (1998–1999, 2001, 2008)

Awards
- Wisconsin–Stevens Point Hall of Fame (2022)

John Miech (born c. 1953) is an American former college football coach. He was the head football coach for Whitnall High School from 1979 to 1981, Jefferson High School from 1982 to 1984, and the University of Wisconsin–Stevens Point from 1988 to 2011. He also coached for Stephen F. Austin, Wisconsin–Whitewater, and Lock Haven. He played college football for Wisconsin–Stevens Point as an offensive lineman.

In 2022, Miech was inducted in the Wisconsin–Stevens Point Hall of Fame.

== Head coaching record ==
=== College ===
Year	Team	Overall	Conference	Standing	Bowl/playoffs	NAIA D-II/D3^{#}	AFCA^{°}
Wisconsin–Stevens Point Pointers (Wisconsin State University Conference / Wisconsin Intercollegiate Athletic Conference) (1988–2011)
1988	Wisconsin–Stevens Point	7–4	5–3	4th		25	
1989	Wisconsin–Stevens Point	8–2–1	6–1–1	2nd	L NAIA Division II First Round	9	
1990	Wisconsin–Stevens Point	6–4	4–4	4th			
1991	Wisconsin–Stevens Point	6–3–1	6–2	T–2nd		20	
1992	Wisconsin–Stevens Point	5–4	4–3	T–4th			
1993	Wisconsin–Stevens Point	8–2	6–1	2nd			
1994	Wisconsin–Stevens Point	7–3	5–2	T–2nd			
1995	Wisconsin–Stevens Point	8–2	5–2	3rd			
1996	Wisconsin–Stevens Point	6–3	4–3	4th			
1997	Wisconsin–Stevens Point	6–4	3–4	T–5th			
1998	Wisconsin–Stevens Point	7–2	5–2	T–1st			
1999	Wisconsin–Stevens Point	9–2	6–1	T–1st	L NCAA Division III First Round		19
2000	Wisconsin–Stevens Point	2–8	1–6	T–6th			
2001	Wisconsin–Stevens Point	8–3	5–2	T–1st	L NCAA Division III Second Round		
2002	Wisconsin–Stevens Point	6–4	4–3	T–3rd			
2003	Wisconsin–Stevens Point	8–2	5–2	T–2nd		18	
2004	Wisconsin–Stevens Point	6–4	4–3	T–2nd			
2005	Wisconsin–Stevens Point	4–6	3–4	T–5th			
2006	Wisconsin–Stevens Point	6–4	4–3	3rd			
2007	Wisconsin–Stevens Point	6–4	3–4	T–4th			
2008	Wisconsin–Stevens Point	9–2	6–1	T–1st	L NCAA Division III First Round	14	
2009	Wisconsin–Stevens Point	7–3	6–1	2nd			
2010	Wisconsin–Stevens Point	7–3	5–2	2nd			
2011	Wisconsin–Stevens Point	4–6	2–5	T–6th			
Wisconsin–Stevens Point:		156–84–2	107–65–1				
Total:		156–84–2					
National championship Conference title Conference division title or championship game berth
