= Joseph Marshall Flint =

American football player, coach, and surgeon (1872–1944)

Biographical details
- Born: 1872
- Died: September 16, 1944; Seal Harbor, Maine, U.S.
- Education: Johns Hopkins (MD, 1900)

Playing career
- 1891–1893: Princeton
- Position: Halfback

Coaching career (HC unless noted)
- 1894–1895: Butler
- 1897: Stevens Point Normal

Head coaching record
- Overall: 10–4

Joseph Marshall Flint (July 8, 1872 – September 16, 1944) was an American college football player and coach and surgeon. He served as the head football coach at Butler University in Indianapolis from 1894 to 1895 and at Stevens Point Normal School—now known as the University of Wisconsin–Stevens Point—in 1897, compiling a career college football coaching record of 10–4.

Flint receive his medical degree from Johns Hopkins University in 1900 and served as a surgeon in the United States Military during World War I. He was noted for his ability to bring assembly line style procedures to the medical process.

Flint was married in 1903 to Anne Apperson, who died in 1970, at the age of 92. At the time of their marriage, Flint was a professor of medicine at University of California, Berkeley.

== Head coaching record ==
Year	Team	Overall	Conference	Standing	Bowl/playoffs
Butler Christians (Indiana Intercollegiate Athletic Association) (1894)
1894	Butler	6–1			
Butler Christians (Independent) (1895)
1895	Butler	2–2			
Butler:		8–3			
Stevens Point Normal (Independent) (1897)
1897	Stevens Point Normal	2–1			
Stevens Point Normal:		2–1			
Total:		10–4			
