= Wisconsin–Stevens Point Pointers football =

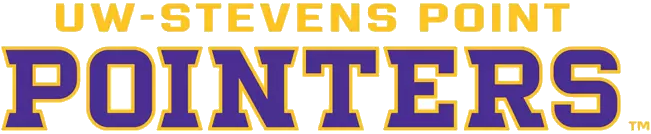
- First season: 1895; 131 years ago
- Head coach: Luke Venne; 4th season, 7–33 (.175)
- Location: Stevens Point, Wisconsin
- Stadium: Goerke Field (capacity: 4,500)
- NCAA division: Division III
- Conference: WIAC
- Colors: Purple and gold
- All-time record: 516–456–43 (.530)
- Playoff record: 4–6–1 (.409)

National championships
- Unclaimed: NAIA Division II: 1987

Conference championships
- WIAC: 1928, 1933, 1934, 1936, 1946, 1949, 1955, 1961, 1977, 1986, 1998, 1999, 2001, 2008
- Consensus All-Americans: 5
- Website: athletics.uwsp.edu/football

The Wisconsin–Stevens Point Pointers football program is the intercollegiate American football team for the University of Wisconsin–Stevens Point located in the U.S. state of Wisconsin. Wisconsin–Stevens Point competes at the NCAA Division III level and is a member of the Wisconsin Intercollegiate Athletic Conference (WIAC).

== Head coaching history ==
Wisconsin–Stevens Point has had 35 head coaches in their history.

Coaches	Seasons	Term	Wins	Losses	Ties	Win %	Nat. titles	Conf. titles	Playoff App.
Unknown	1	1894	0	1	0	.000	0	N/A	N/A
Joseph Raycroft	2	1895–1896	6	2	0	.750	0	N/A	N/A
Joseph Marshall Flint	1	1897	2	1	0	.667	0	N/A	N/A
V.E. McCaskill	1	1898	3	2	0	.600	0	N/A	N/A
Walter E. Garrey	1	1899	4	1	0	.800	0	N/A	N/A
Harvey Schofield	2	1900, 1903	2	3	1	.417	0	N/A	N/A
Professor Spindler	1	1901	2	2	0	.500	0	N/A	N/A
James Christiansen	1	1902	1	2	0	.333	0	N/A	N/A
Arnie Lerum	1	1904	1	2	0	.333	0	N/A	N/A
Dr. Smiley	1	1905	0	2	1	.167	0	N/A	N/A
Clarence Mortell	1	1906	5	1	1	.786	0	N/A	N/A
W.F. Lusk	4	1907–1910	9	8	3	.525	0	N/A	N/A
Leonard Schneller	2	1912–1913	0	9	1	.050	0	0	N/A
George Corneal	3	1914–1916	14	7	0	.667	0	0	N/A
Raymond W. Fairchild & Charles F. Watson	2	1917–1918	3	4	1	.438	0	0	N/A
S.A. Tenison	1	1919	2	3	1	.417	0	0	N/A
Joe Swetland	6	1920–1925	13	24	4	.366	0	0	N/A
Walter Hunting	1	1926	1	3	1	.300	0	0	N/A
Carl Eggebrecht	2	1927–1928	7	3	2	.667	0	1	N/A
Mr. Stockdale	2	1929–1930	1	12	1	.107	0	0	N/A
Eddie Kotal	11	1931–1941	37	36	9	.506	0	3	N/A
George Berg	4^	1942–1947	8	13	1	.386	0	1	N/A
Hale Quandt	4	1948–1951	13	12	7	.516	0	1	N/A
John Roberts	5	1952–1956	29	10	1	.738	0	1	0
Duaine Counsell	11	1957–1965, 1967–1968	56	33	4	.624	0	1	0
Bill Burns	1	1966	6	2	0	.750	0	0	0
Pat O'Halloran	3	1969–1971	3	26	1	.117	0	0	0
Monte Charles	4	1972–1975	13	27	0	.325	0	0	0
Ron Steiner	5	1976–1980	28	22	1	.559	0	1	1
D. J. LeRoy	7	1981–1987	34	44	1	.437	1*	2*	2*
John Miech	24	1988–2011	156	83	2	.651	0	4	4
Tom Journell	6	2012–2017	29	31	0	.483	0	0	0
Greg Breitbach	3^	2018–2021	9	21	0	.300	0	0	0
Luke Venne	4	2022–present	7	33	0	.175	0	0	0

^ No team was fielded in 1911. Additionally, no teams were fielded in 1943 and 1944 due to World War II, or in 2020 due to the COVID-19 pandemic.

* All wins, ties, and championships from the Pointers 1987 season were later vacated due to using two ineligible players. The conference title was retroactively awarded to Wisconsin–River Falls and Wisconsin–Whitewater as co–champions and Pacific Lutheran was retroactively awarded the national title outright.

== Championships ==
=== National championship ===
Wisconsin–Stevens Point won the NAIA Division II football national championship in 1987. The title was split with Pacific Lutheran after the two teams played to a 16–16 tie. The Pointers later vacated their share of the title for use of two ineligible players.

Year	Coach	Division	Opponent	Result	Record
1987*	D. J. LeRoy	NAIA Division II	Pacific Lutheran	T 16–16	0–15*

=== Conference championships ===
Wisconsin–Stevens Point has won the Wisconsin Intercollegiate Athletic Conference (WIAC) championship 14 times.

Year	Coach	Overall record	WIAC record
1928†	Carl Eggebrecht	5–0–1	3–0–1
1933†	Eddie Kotal	7–0–1	4–0–1
1934†	Eddie Kotal	7–1	5–0
1936†	Eddie Kotal	3–3–1	2–1–1
1946†	George Berg	3–2–1	3–1–1
1949†	Hale Quandt	6–1–1	5–1
1955	John Roberts	8–0	6–0
1961	Duaine Counsell	8–1	7–1
1977	Ron Steiner	8–2–1	7–0–1
1986†	D. J. LeRoy	8–4	7–1
1987*	D. J. LeRoy	0–15*	0–8*
1998†	John Miech	7–2	5–2
1999†	John Miech	9–2	6–1
2001†	John Miech	8–3	5–2
2008†	John Miech	9–2	6–1

† Co-champions

* The Pointers had a conference record of 7–1 and an overall record of 12–2–1 at the end of the 1987 season, all wins and ties were later vacated due to using two ineligible players. The conference title was retroactively awarded to Wisconsin–River Falls and Wisconsin–Whitewater as co–champions and Pacific Lutheran was retroactively awarded the national title outright

== Postseason ==
=== NCAA Division III playoffs ===
The Pointers have made five appearances in the NCAA Division III playoffs, with a combined record of 1–4.

Year	Round	Opponent	Result	Record
1986	First Round	Concordia–Moorhead	L 15–24	8–4
1999	First Round	Saint John's (MN)	L 10–23	9–2
2001	First Round	Bethel (MN)	W 37–27	8–3
2001	Second Round	Saint John's (MN)	L 7–9	8–3
2008	First Round	Wartburg	L 21–26	9–2

=== NAIA Division I playoffs ===
The Pointers have made one appearance in the NAIA Division I playoffs, with a combined record of 0–1.

Year	Round	Opponent	Result	Record
1977	Semifinals	Abilene Christian (TX)	L 7–35	8–2–1

=== NAIA Division II playoffs ===
The Pointers have made one appearance in the NAIA Division II playoffs, with a combined record of 3–1–1 and one split national championship. Later, the Pointers forfeited their 12 wins and their share of the title after it was found they had used two ineligible players and Pacific Lutheran were named national champions outright.

Year	Round	Opponent	Result	Record
1987	First Round	Westmar	W 50–24	0–15*
1987	Quarterfinals	Saint Ambrose	W 30–14	0–15*
1987	Semifinals	Geneva	W 48–25	0–15*
1987	Championship	Pacific Lutheran	T 16–16	0–15*
1989	First Round	Wisconsin–La Crosse	L 20–30	8–2–1

*The Pointers had a record of 12–2–1 at the end of the 1987 season, the 0–15 record reflects 13 forfeits due to playing two ineligible players.

== Ranked teams ==
Starting in 1999, the American Football Coaches Association (AFCA) began publishing rankings for Division III football. In 2003, D3football.com started publishing its own rankings for Division III football. Since the inception of both polls, Wisconsin–Stevens Point has been ranked at least four times in the AFCA Coaches Poll and two times in the D3football.com poll to end the season. Additionally, while not being ranked in the Top 25 to end the season, the Pointers have received votes (RV) in both polls two additional years.

Year	D3	AFCA	Record
1999	N/A	19	9–2
2001	N/A	13	8–3
2002	N/A	RV	6–4
2003	18	23	8–2
2008	14	16	9–2
2009	RV	RV	7–3
2010	RV	Unknown	7–3

== Border Battle ==
From 1984 to 2000 the Hubert H. Humphrey Metrodome, home to the Minnesota Vikings and Minnesota Golden Gophers, hosted games in November between WIAC teams and Northern Sun Intercollegiate Conference (NSIC) teams at the NCAA Division II level in what came to be known as the "Border Battle". The Pointers played at the Metrodome three times, and had a 3–0 record.

Date	Opponent	Result
November 14, 1998	Southwest Minnesota State	W 28–16
November 20, 1999	Bemidji State	W 35–23
November 11, 2000	Winona State	W 30–25

== Facilities ==
In 1995 the Jacksonville Jaguars of the National Football League chose the university to host its inaugural preseason training camp. Five other NFL teams used campuses across Wisconsin and Minnesota for training camp, in what was known as the Cheese League.

== Notable former players ==
=== NFL draftees ===
Year	Round	Pick	Overall	Player	Team	Position
1966	16	14	244	Bob Schultz	Green Bay Packers	DE
1988	12	3	308	Aatron Kenney	Indianapolis Colts	WR
1990	9	22	242	Kirk Baumgartner	Green Bay Packers	QB
1991	10	8	258	Pete Lucas	Atlanta Falcons	T
1992	10	27	279	Barry Rose	Buffalo Bills	WR
1999	6	8	177	Clint Kriewaldt	Detroit Lions	LB
2017	1	32	32	Ryan Ramczyk	New Orleans Saints	OT
2022	2	25	57	Luke Goedeke	Tampa Bay Buccaneers	OT

=== Other notable former players ===
- Clayt Birmingham
- Bob Bostad
- Jake Dickert
- Ted Fritsch
- John Miech
- Jerry Olszewski
