= Wesley Beschorner =

American football coach (born 1982)

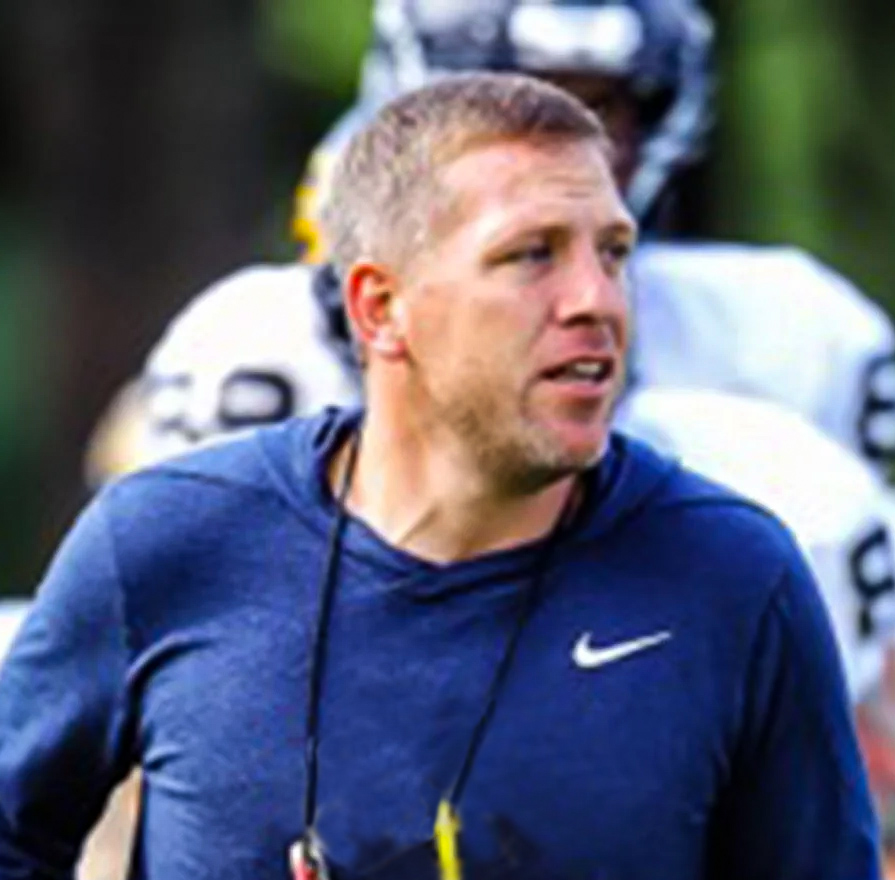

Current position
- Title: Tight ends coach
- Team: Wake Forest
- Conference: ACC

Biographical details
- Born: November 11, 1982 (age 43); Lohrville, Iowa, U.S.
- Education: University of South Dakota (2005, 2008)

Playing career
- 2001–2005: South Dakota
- Position: Quarterback

Coaching career (HC unless noted)
- 2006–2007: South Dakota (GA)
- 2008: South Dakota (QB)
- 2009–2011: South Dakota (OC/QB)
- 2012–2015: South Dakota (assoc. HC/OC/QB)
- 2016: Pittsburgh (OQC)
- 2017: Rice (QB)
- 2018: Maryland (QB)
- 2019–2022: Wisconsin–Eau Claire
- 2023: Northern Illinois (RB)
- 2024: Northern Illinois (OC/RB)
- 2025–present: Wake Forest (TE)

Head coaching record
- Overall: 8–22

Accomplishments and honors

Awards
- South Dakota Hall of Fame (2017)

Wesley Beschorner (born November 11, 1982) is an American college football coach. He was the head football coach for the University of Wisconsin–Eau Claire from 2019 to 2022. He also coached for South Dakota, Pittsburgh, Rice, Maryland, Northern Illinois. He played college football for South Dakota as a quarterback.

== Playing career ==
Beschorner was a first-team All-American at quarterback at the University of South Dakota. He finished as runner-up for the Harlon Hill Trophy (Division II MVP) as a senior in 2005.

== Coaching career ==
Beschorner began his coaching career at his alma mater, South Dakota, as a graduate assistant. After working with the wide receivers in 2006 he worked with the running backs in 2007. In 2008, after finishing his master's degree he was hired as the team's quarterbacks coach. After one year he was promoted to offensive coordinator. In 2012, he added the role of associate head coach. In 2016, after fifteen seasons with South Dakota—as a player and coach—he left to become an offensive quality control coach for Pittsburgh. Over the next two years, he spent time with Rice and Maryland as the quarterbacks coach for both schools.

In 2019, Beschorner was hired as the head football coach for Wisconsin–Eau Claire. In four years (three seasons) he led the team to an overall record of 8–22. He resigned following the 2022 season.

In 2023, Beschorner was hired as the offensive coordinator and running backs coach for Northern Illinois. In 2024, he helped lead Northern Illinois to a win over No. 5 ranked Notre Dame 16–14.

In 2025, Beschorner was hired as an offensive analyst and named tight ends coach for Wake Forest after the completion of the 2025 season.

== Personal life ==
A native of Lohrville, Iowa, Beschorner married Kiki Smith of Wahpeton North Dakota. The couple have 3 sons. He has been inducted into the Coyote Sports Hall of Fame and the Iowa High School Athletics Association Hall of Fame.

== Head coaching record ==
Year	Team	Overall	Conference	Standing	Bowl/playoffs
Wisconsin–Eau Claire Blugolds (Wisconsin Intercollegiate Athletic Conference) (2019–2022)
2019	Wisconsin–Eau Claire	3–7	1–6	T–7th	
2020–21	No team—COVID-19				
2021	Wisconsin–Eau Claire	3–7	1–6	7th	
2022	Wisconsin–Eau Claire	2–8	1–6	7th	
Wisconsin–Eau Claire:		8–22	3–18		
Total:		8–22			
