= 1997 Lakeland Muskies football team =

American college football season

1997 Lakeland Muskies football

IBFC champion
- Conference: Illini–Badger Conference
- Record: 10–0 (5–0 IBC)
- Head coach: Randy Awrey (4th season)
- Home stadium: Taylor Field

1997 Illini–Badger Football Conference standings
	Conf.			Overall
Team	W		L	W		L
Lakeland $	5	–	0	10	–	0
Concordia (WI)	4	–	1	7	–	3
MacMurray	3	–	2	8	–	2
Eureka	2	–	3	5	–	5
Concordia (IL)	1	–	4	2	–	7
Greenville	0	–	5	2	–	8
$ – Conference champion

The 1997 Lakeland Muskies football team was an American football team that represented Lakeland University as a member of the Illini–Badger Conference (IBC) during the 1997 NCAA Division III football season. In their fourth year under head coach Randy Awrey, the Muskies compiled a perfect 10–0 record (5–0 in conference games), won the IBC championship, and outscored opponents by a total of 428 to 116.

The Muskies also won the final eight games of the 1996 season and ran their winning streak to 18 games in 1997. Despite their undefeated record, they were not invited to participate in the 16-team Division III playoffs.

Lakeland's quarterback Mark Novara completed 252 of 427 passes for 3,098 yards, 23 touchdowns, and six interceptions. He also set an NCAA career record with 894 pass completions and was selected as the IBC 1997 player of the year. He also set Lakeland records for career passing yards (11,295) and touchdown passes (101).

Other IBC honors went to Randy Awrey (oach of the year); Brian Wesoloski (co-defensive lineman of the year); and Cebulka (special teams player of the year). Other players receiving first-team honors on the 1997 All-IBC football team were wide receivers George Schultz and Brandon Lawson; center John Kalk; receiver David Drane; defensive lineman Carl McMillan; and defensive backs Derrick Smith and Pedro Redding.

The team's statistical leaders included Novara with 3,098 passing yards, Curtis Beal with 644 rushing yards, David Drane with 607 receiving yards, and Kimani Cham with 86 points scored.

The team played its home games at Taylor Field in Herman, Wisconsin.

== Schedule ==
Date	Opponent	Site	Result	Attendance	Source
September 6	at Ripon*	Ripon, WI	W 48–0		
September 13	Maranatha Baptist*	Taylor Field; Herman, WI	W 32–14	825	
September 20	at Carthage*	Kenosha, WI	W 42–26		
September 27	Franklin (IN)*	Taylor Field; Herman, WI	W 40–6	540	
October 4	Greenville^{†}	Taylor Field; Herman, WI	W 59–7	730	
October 11	at Concordia (WI)	Mequon, WI	W 41–33		
October 18	at MacMurray	Jacksonville, IL	W 24–17		
October 25	Concordia (IL)	Taylor Field; Herman, WI	W 67–0	680	
November 1	at Eureka	Eureka, IL	W 24–13		
November 15	at Kentucky Wesleyan*	Owensboro, KY	W 51–0		
*Non-conference game; ^{†}Homecoming
