= Greg Breitbach =

American football coach (born c. 1971)

Biographical details
- Born: c. 1971 (age 54–55)
- Education: Western Montana College of The University of Montana (1994); Portland State University (2002)

Playing career
- 1989–1990: Dickinson State
- 1991–1992: Montana Western
- Position: Quarterback

Coaching career (HC unless noted)
- 1993–1994: Montana Western (RB/LB)
- 1995: Wolf Point HS (MT) (DC)
- 1996–1998: Montana Western (OC/QB)
- 1999–2002: Lewis & Clark (ST/WR)
- 2003–2005: Wisconsin–Stevens Point (OC/QB/WR)
- 2006–2007: North Dakota (RB)
- 2008–2012: North Dakota (OC/QB)
- 2013–2017: Millersville
- 2018–2021: Wisconsin–Stevens Point

Head coaching record
- Overall: 19–66

Greg Breitbach (born c. 1971) is an American former college football coach. He was the head football coach for Millersville University of Pennsylvania from 2013 to 2017 and the University of Wisconsin–Stevens Point from 2018 to 2021.

== Playing career ==
Breitbach originally played college football for Dickinson State from 1989 to 1990 and was a member of back-to-back North Dakota College Athletic Conference (NDCAC) championship teams as a quarterback. In 1991, he transferred to Montana Western. He was named team captain in his senior season in 1992.

== Coaching career ==
Breitbach began his coaching career with his alma mater, Montana Western, as the running backs and linebackers coach. After two seasons he was hired by Wolf Point High School as the defensive coordinator. He rejoined Montana Western in 1996 as offensive coordinator and quarterbacks coach. He left Montana Western in 1999 to become the special teams coordinator and wide receivers coach for Lewis & Clark. In 2003, Breitbach was hired as the offensive coordinator, quarterbacks coach, and wide receivers coach for Wisconsin–Stevens Point. After three seasons he became the running backs coach for North Dakota. In 2008, he was promoted to offensive coordinator and quarterbacks coach.

In 2013, Breitbach was hired as the head football coach for Millersville. In five seasons he finished with an overall record of 10–45 and finished the 2017 season with his highest win total as he led the Marauders to a 4–7 record. In 2018, he was hired as the head football coach for Wisconsin–Stevens Point. In four years (three seasons as 2020 was cancelled due to COVID-19) he led the team to a 9–21 record. His best season came in his first season as he finished 4–6. He resigned following the 2021 season.

== Head coaching record ==
Year	Team	Overall	Conference	Standing	Bowl/playoffs
Millersville Marauders (Pennsylvania State Athletic Conference) (2013–2017)
2013	Millersville	1–10	1–6	7th (East)	
2014	Millersville	1–10	1–8	7th (East)	
2015	Millersville	2–9	1–6	7th (East)	
2016	Millersville	2–9	1–6	7th (East)	
2017	Millersville	4–7	3–4	5th (East)	
Millersville:		10–45	7–30		
Wisconsin–Stevens Point Pointers (Wisconsin Intercollegiate Athletic Conference) (2018–2021)
2018	Wisconsin–Stevens Point	4–6	3–4	T–4th	
2019	Wisconsin–Stevens Point	3–7	2–5	6th	
2020–21	No team—COVID-19				
2021	Wisconsin–Stevens Point	2–8	0–7	8th	
Wisconsin–Stevens Point:		9–21	5–16		
Total:		19–66			
