= Kevin Fitzgerald (American football) =

American football player (born 1964)

No. 89
- Position: Tight end

Personal information
- Born: June 30, 1964 (age 62); La Crosse, Wisconsin, U.S.
- Listed height: 6 ft 3 in (1.91 m)
- Listed weight: 235 lb (107 kg)

Career information
- High school: Winona
- College: Wisconsin–Eau Claire
- NFL draft: 1987: undrafted

Career history
- Green Bay Packers (1987)
- Stats at Pro Football Reference

Kevin Fitzgerald (born June 30, 1964) is an American former professional football tight end in the National Football League (NFL).

== Early life ==
Fitzgerald was born on June 30, 1964.

== Career ==
Fitzgerald was a member of the Green Bay Packers during the 1987 NFL season. He played at the collegiate level at the University of Wisconsin-Eau Claire.
