= Ralph E. Davis Pioneer Stadium =

Stadium in Platteville, Wisconsin

Coordinates: 42.7278795°N 90.48666°W

Pioneer Stadium
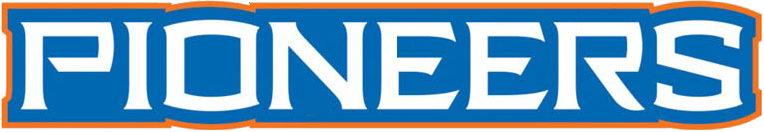

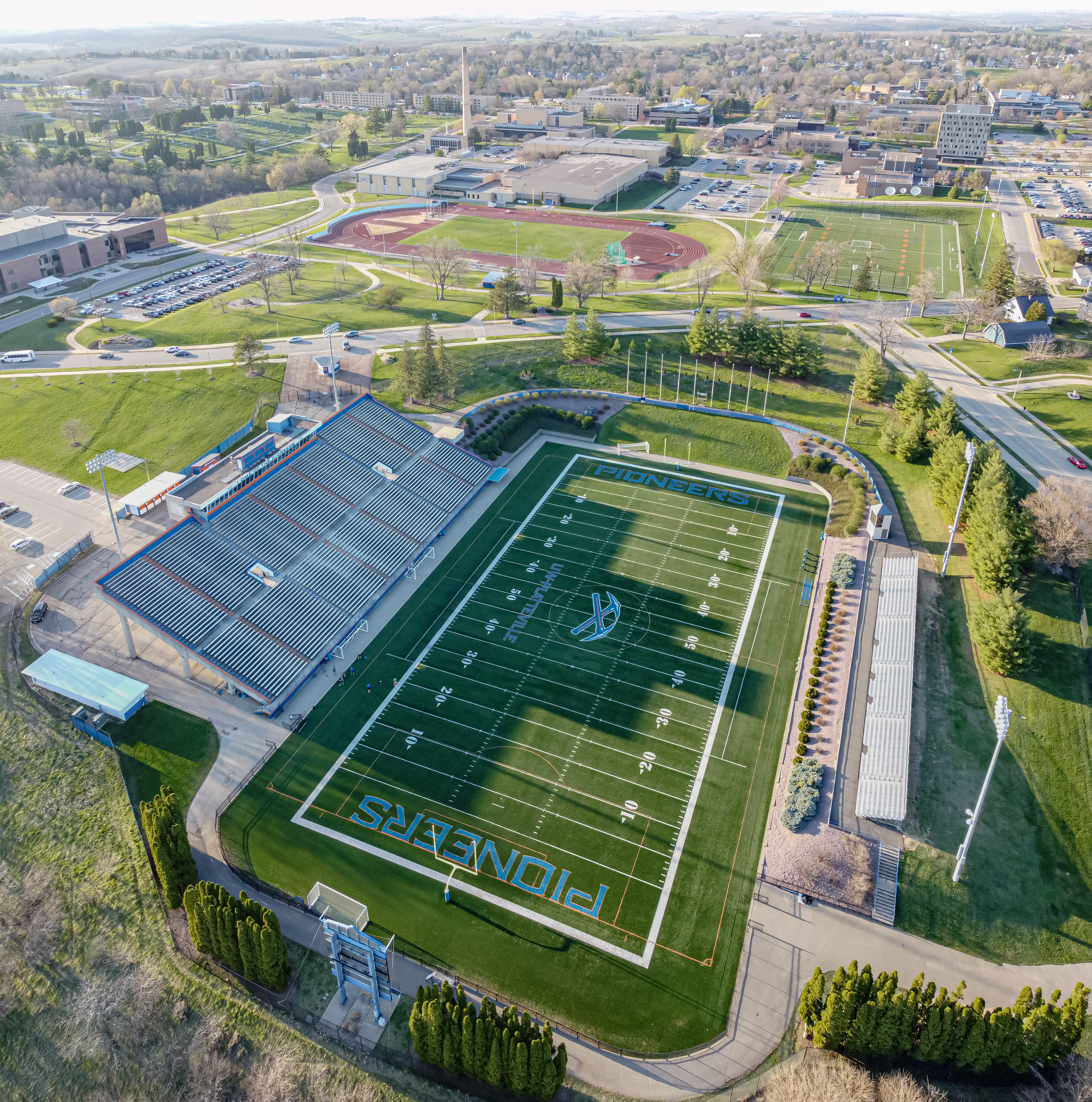
- Aerial view of the stadium in 2024
- Interactive map of Pioneer Stadium
- Full name: Ralph E. Davis Pioneer Stadium
- Address: Platteville, Wisconsin; United States
- Owner: UW Platteville
- Operator: UW Platteville Athletics
- Capacity: 10,000
- Type: Stadium
- Surface: ProGrass artificial turf
- Current use: Football; Soccer
- Public transit: Green Orange; Platteville Public Transportation

Construction
- Opened: 1972; 54 years ago

Tenants
- Wisconsin–Platteville Pioneers (NCAA) teams: football, soccer

Website
- letsgopioneers.com//pioneer-stadium

Ralph E. Davis Pioneer Stadium is a stadium in Platteville, Wisconsin, on the campus of the University of Wisconsin–Platteville. The venue is home to the Wisconsin–Platteville Pioneers football and soccer teams.

== History ==
Pioneer Stadium opened in 1972 and holds 10,000 people. It is the second largest stadium in Division III collegiate football, and the largest soccer stadium. From 1984 to 2001, the stadium and other university facilities were also used as the Chicago Bears' training camp home.

The stadium is named for Ralph Emerson Davis, a geologist and "godfather of the natural gas industry," who served as the director of the Wisconsin Mining School, which would eventually merge to form the University of Wisconsin–Platteville. Davis's generous donation helped complete the $1.25 million facilities.

In 2005, stadium renovations included replacing the grass surface with a Pro-Grass in-fill surface.

On June 16, 2014, the stadium was damaged by a tornado.
