= Marshall-University High School =

High school in Minneapolis, Minnesota closed in 1982

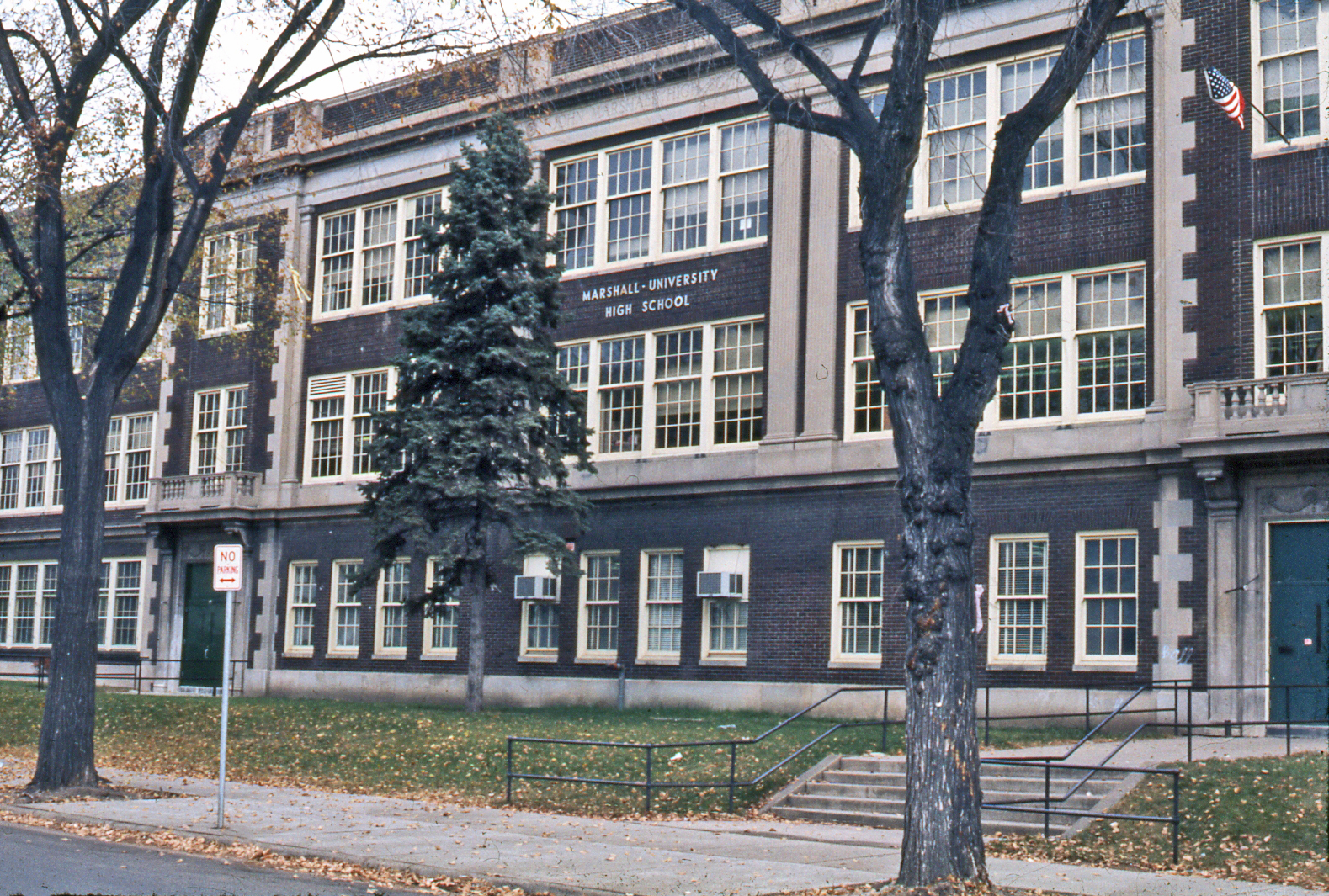
- Marshall-University High School in 1976
- 1313 5th St SE; Minneapolis, Minnesota; United States

Information
- Type: public, laboratory
- Opened: 1902
- Closed: 1982
- School district: Minneapolis Public Schools (1968–1982)
- Grades: 6–12
- Mascot: Cardinals

Marshall-University High School was a public junior high and high school serving grades 6–12 in Minneapolis, Minnesota.

The school was founded in 1968 through a merger between John Marshall High School (a Minneapolis public school) and University High School (a laboratory school at the University of Minnesota) in an attempt to diversify the student body. Minneapolis Public Schools closed Central, West and Marshall-University high schools in 1982. The Marshall-University building was later used by the Dinkytown Technical Center. In 2013, the building was razed and The Marshall, a luxury corporate-owned apartment building named after the former school, was built on the site.

== History ==
University High School was created by the University of Minnesota Board of Regents in 1908 as a laboratory school. The school had selective admissions, and attendance size was kept low. Most of the students were children of University of Minnesota professors. At the time of the merger, the school was located in Peik Hall on the university campus.

John Marshall High School was located at 1313 5th Street SE and was demolished in 2013 after serving as the Dinkytown Technical Center, a commercial office space from 1983 to 2013.

For several years, students took classes at both Peik Hall and at the Marshall building before the university took back Peik Hall for other needs and all classes were in the Marshall (now Marshall-U) building. However, gym classes and basketball games were still held in Peik Gym until the closing of the school in 1982.

== Athletics ==
University High School was a founding member of the Lake Conference in 1932. They won a conference football title in 1930. When the school merged with Marshall, the combined school used the Cardinals nickname adopted from Marshall.

Marshall-U won a Class A Minnesota State High School League (MSHSL) state boys basketball title in 1976. As the smallest high school in Minneapolis, Marshall-U left the Minneapolis Public Schools Conference and became a founding member of the Tri-Metro Conference for most sports in the mid-1970s. Marshall's football field was at 10th and Johnson in SE Minneapolis until the construction of 35W - the location is now an off ramp. In the mid 70's home football games were played at the University of Minnesota's Memorial Stadium and then played at Parade Stadium.

== Yearbooks ==
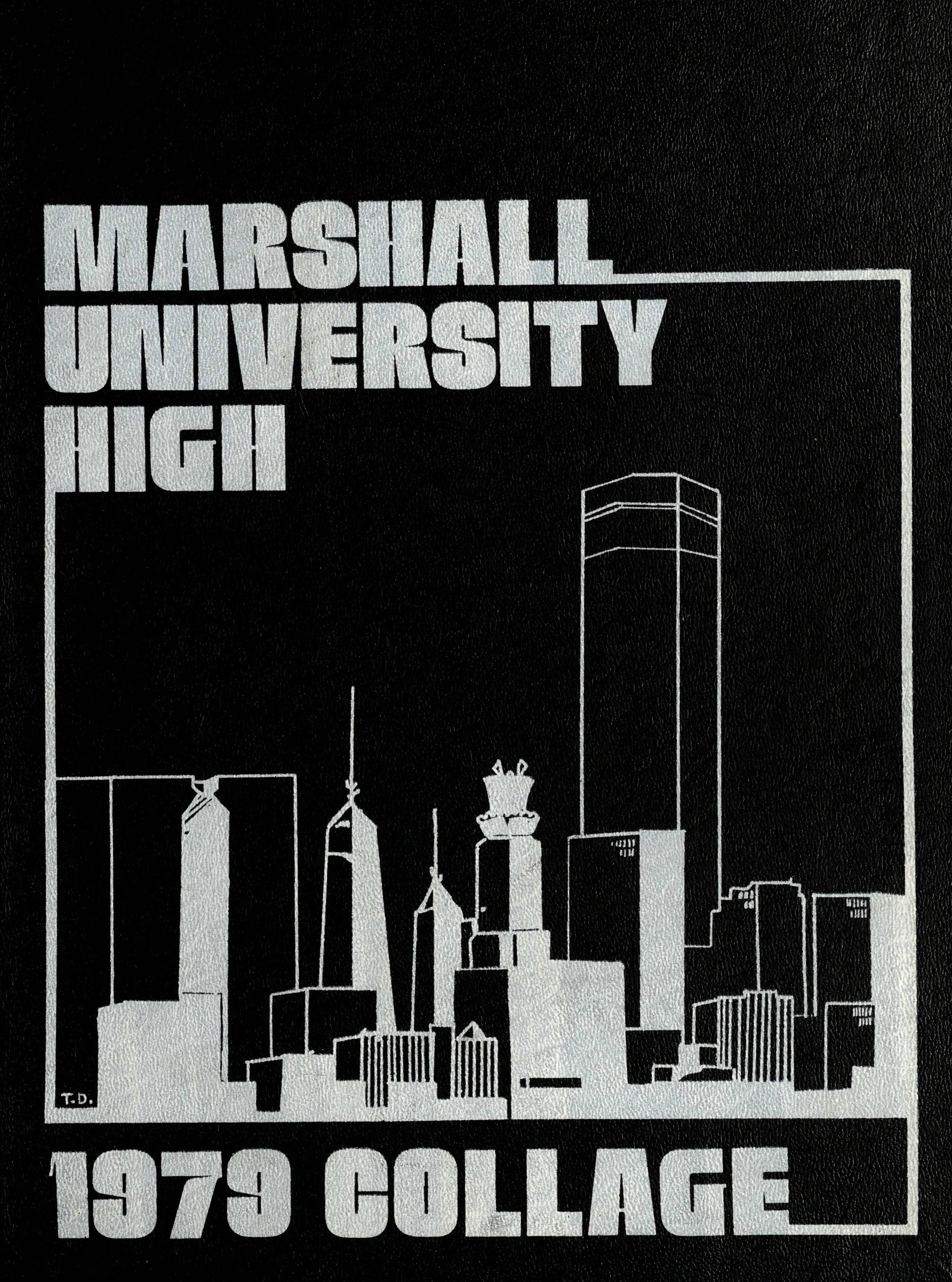
Marshall-University Yearbook, Collage 1979

The Marshall yearbooks were named "The Cardinal." University's yearbooks were named the "Bisbila." The new school's yearbooks were called "The Collage" until the last year when "The Cardinal" was used one last time.

== Notable alumni ==
- Mark Frost, writer
- Walt Jocketty, sports executive
- Karl Mueller, musician
- Dan Murphy, musician
- Steve Sandell, politician
- Lea Thompson, actress
- Jellybean Johnson
