= Awrey Island =

Island in Nunavut, Canada

- Location within Nunavut Location within Canada

Geography
- Location: Hudson Bay
- Coordinates: 62°07′59″N 079°16′00″W
- Archipelago: Arctic Archipelago

Administration
- Canada
- Nunavut: Nunavut
- Region: Qikiqtaaluk

Demographics
- Population: Uninhabited

Awrey Island is an uninhabited island located in Hudson Bay, within the Qikiqtaaluk Region of Nunavut, Canada. It is situated 1 km (0.62 mi) east of Mansel Island. Quebec's Ungava Peninsula is to the east.

== Geography ==
Characteristics of this isolated, young (less than 2000 years old) island include low-lying tundra and a rocky shoreline.

== Fauna ==
The island is a Canadian Important Bird Area (#NU018) and a Key Migratory Bird Terrestrial Habitat site. It is notable for the common eider species.
