= 1977 Little All-America college football team =

American college football all-star team

The 1977 Little All-America college football team is composed of college football players from small colleges and universities who were selected by the Associated Press (AP) as the best players at each position.

== First team ==
| Position | Player | Team |
|---|---|---|
Offense
| Quarterback | Reed Giordana | Wisconsin–Stevens Point |
| Running back | Bill Burnham | New Hampshire |
| Running back | Larry Collins | Texas A&I |
| Wide receiver | Terry Hutt | Boise State |
| Wide receiver | Steve Kreider | Lehigh |
| Tight end | Kevin Cummins | UMass |
| Tackle | Harold Cotton | Boise State |
| Tackle | Grady Vigneau | New Hampshire |
| Guard | Steve Head | Kutztown State |
| Guard | Tyrone McGriff | Florida A&M |
| Center | Frank Bouressa | Lawrence |
Defense
| Defensive end | Bill Matthews | South Dakota |
| Defensive end | John Mohring | C. W. Post |
| Defensive tackle | Jesse Baker | Jacksonville State |
| Defensive tackle | Barry Bennett | Concordia (MN) |
| Middle guard | Ray Allred | Idaho State |
| Linebacker | Bob Bible | Austin Peay |
| Linebacker | Steve Cockerham | Akron |
| Linebacker | Rusty Rebowe | Nicholls State |
| Defensive back | Louis Blanton | Southwestern Oklahoma State |
| Defensive back | Mitch Brown | St. Lawrence |
| Defensive back | Frank Dark | Virginia Union |

== See also ==
- 1977 College Football All-America Team
