= Cheese League =

Informal grouping of National Football League teams

The Cheese League
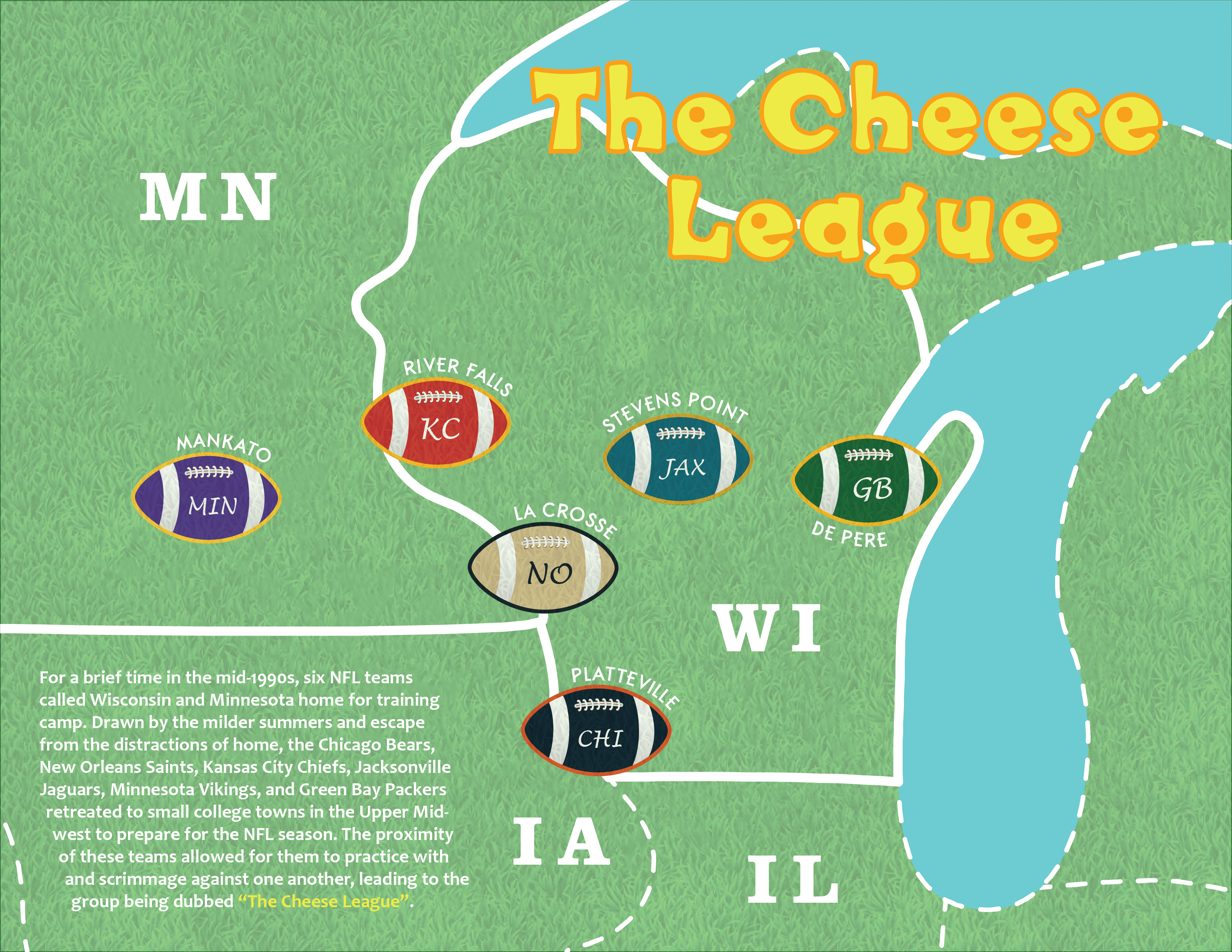
- A map showing the locations of each team's training camp
- Association: National Football League
- Sport: American football
- Founded: 1984
- Ceased: 2009
- No. of teams: 6

The Cheese League was the informal name given to the National Football League teams that held their training camps and scrimmages in Minnesota and Wisconsin. The Cheese League reached its apex in 1995 with six NFL teams. Drawn by the milder summers, an escape from the distractions of home, and great facilities, these teams retreated to college towns in Wisconsin to prepare for the NFL season. The league had its strongest participation throughout the 1990s with five teams, peaking in 1995 with six teams thanks to the participation of the Jacksonville Jaguars for a single year. This proximity allowed the teams to practice with and scrimmage against one another - allowing for a nice change of pace and more realistic preparation for the regular season. Despite this perk, as well as the cooler summer weather, the non-local teams eventually decided that it was politically and logistically wiser to host training camp in their home states. With the Minnesota Vikings announcing that the 2017 training camp would be their last in Mankato, all six former members of the Cheese League will now hold camp in the same metro area that they are located.

== Teams ==
Team	Location	Stadium
Chicago Bears	Platteville, Wisconsin	Davis Pioneer Stadium
Green Bay Packers	De Pere, Wisconsin	Schnieder Stadium
Jacksonville Jaguars	Stevens Point, Wisconsin	Goerke Field
Kansas City Chiefs	River Falls, Wisconsin	Ramer Field
Minnesota Vikings	Mankato, Minnesota	Blakeslee Stadium
New Orleans Saints	La Crosse, Wisconsin	Veterans Memorial Stadium
