= 1987 Pacific Lutheran Lutes football team =

American college football season

1987 Pacific Lutheran Lutes football

NAIA Division II national co-champion CFL champion
- Conference: Columbia Football League
- Record: 11–1–1 (4–1–1 CFL)
- Head coach: Frosty Westering (16th season)
- Home stadium: Lakewood Stadium, Carl Sparks Stadium

1987 Columbia Football League standings
	Conf.					Overall
Team	W		L		T	W		L		T
Northern Division
No. 8 Central Washington * x	5	–	1	–	0	7	–	3	–	0
No. 6 Pacific Lutheran ^	4	–	1	–	1	11	–	1	–	1
No. 17 Puget Sound	4	–	2	–	0	6	–	3	–	0
Simon Fraser	4	–	2	–	0	4	–	6	–	0
Western Washington	2	–	3	–	1	4	–	3	–	2
Whitworth	1	–	5	–	0	3	–	6	–	0
Lewis & Clark	0	–	6	–	0	0	–	9	–	0
Southern Division
Oregon Tech x	5	–	1	–	0	5	–	4	–	0
No. 15 Southern Oregon *	4	–	2	–	0	7	–	4	–	0
Linfield	4	–	2	–	0	5	–	4	–	0
Pacific (OR)	3	–	2	–	1	4	–	3	–	2
Western Oregon	3	–	3	–	0	5	–	4	–	0
Willamette	1	–	4	–	1	3	–	5	–	1
Eastern Oregon	0	–	6	–	0	1	–	8	–	0
x – Division champion/co-champions; * – NAIA Division I playoff participant ^ – NAIA Division II playoff participant; Rankings from NAIA Division I poll for Central Washington, Puget Sound, and Southern Oregon and NAIA Division II poll for Pacific Lutheran

The 1987 Pacific Lutheran Lutes football team was an American football team that represented Pacific Lutheran University in the Columbia Football League (CFL) during the 1987 NAIA Division II football season. In their 16th season under head coach Frosty Westering, the Lutes compiled an 11–1–1 record and tied for the NAIA Division II national championship. The team participated in the NAIA Division II playoffs where they defeated Midland Lutheran (Nebraska) (40–21) in the first round, Carroll (Montana) (36–26) in the quarterfinal, and Baker (Kansas) (17–14) in the semifinal.

In the national championship game, the Lutes played a 16–16 tie with Wisconsin–Stevens Point. Wisconsin–Stevens Point later forfeited its share of the national championship because of its use of ineligible players.

Junior linebacker Keith Krassin was selected as the CFL Northern Division co-defensive player of the year.

The team played its home games during the regular season at Lakewood Stadium in Lakewood, Washington. For the playoffs, the team switched to Carl Sparks Stadium in Puyallup, Washington.

Coach Westering won four national championships at Pacific Lutheran (1980, 1987, 1993, and 1999) and was inducted into the College Football Hall of Fame in 2005.

== Schedule ==
Date	Opponent	Site	Result	Attendance	Source
September 19	vs. Puget Sound	Tacoma Dome; Tacoma, WA	L 7–24		
September 26	Oregon Tech	Lakewood Stadium; Lakewood, WA	W 27–20	1,950	
October 3	at Whitworth	Pine Bowl; Spokane, WA	W 28–13	1,386	
October 10	at Southern Oregon	Ashland, OR	W 31–21	2,000	
October 17	Linfield	Lakewood Stadium; Lakewood, WA	W 44–20	3,000	
October 24	at Central Washington	Ellensburg, WA	W 42–16	2,300	
October 31	Simon Fraser	Lakewood Stadium; Lakewood, WA	W 42–13	1,850	
November 7	Lewis & Clark	Lakewood Stadium; Lakewood, WA	W 55–22	2,500	
November 14	at Western Washington	Bellingham, WA	T 13–13	2,200	
November 21	Midland Lutheran*	Sparks Stadium; Puyallup, WA (NAIA Division II first round)	W 40–21	1,250	
November 28	at Carroll (MT)*	Helena, MT (NAIA Division II quarterfinal)	W 36–26	2,500	
December 5	Baker*	Sparks Stadium; Puyallup, WA (NAIA Division II semifinal)	W 17–14 ^{OT}	1,750	
December 13	vs. Wisconsin–Stevens Point*	Tacoma Dome; Tacoma, WA (NAIA Division II National Championship Game)	T 16–16	4,453	
*Non-conference game
