= 1997 NCAA Division III football season =

American college football season

- Regular season: August – November 1997
- Playoffs: November – December 1997
- National championship: Salem Football Stadium; Salem, VA
- Champion: Mount Union (3)
- Gagliardi Trophy: Bill Borchert (QB), Mount Union

The 1997 NCAA Division III football season, part of the college football season organized by the NCAA at the Division III level in the United States, began in August 1997, and concluded with the NCAA Division III Football Championship, also known as the Stagg Bowl, in December 1997 at Salem Football Stadium in Salem, Virginia. The Mount Union Purple Raiders won their third, and second consecutive, Division III championship by defeating the Lycoming Warriors, 61−12.

The Gagliardi Trophy, given to the most outstanding player in Division III football, was awarded to Bill Borchert, quarterback from Mount Union.

== Conference standings ==
1997 American Southwest Conference football standings
	Conf.			Overall
Team	W		L	W		L
Mississippi College $	4	–	1	8	–	2
Howard Payne	3	–	2	7	–	3
Hardin–Simmons	2	–	3	7	–	3
McMurry	2	–	3	5	–	5
Austin	2	–	3	4	–	6
Sul Ross	2	–	3	4	–	6
$ – Conference champion

1997 Centennial Conference football standings
	Conf.			Overall
Team	W		L	W		L
Western Maryland $^	7	–	0	10	–	1
Dickinson	6	–	1	7	–	3
Johns Hopkins	5	–	2	7	–	3
Franklin & Marshall	4	–	3	4	–	6
Ursinus	3	–	4	4	–	6
Gettysburg	2	–	5	4	–	6
Muhlenberg	1	–	6	1	–	9
Swarthmore	0	–	7	0	–	10
$ – Conference champion; ^ – NCAA Division III playoff participant

1997 College Conference of Illinois and Wisconsin football standings
	Conf.			Overall
Team	W		L	W		L
Augustana (IL) $	6	–	1	7	–	2
Illinois Wesleyan	5	–	2	7	–	2
Carthage	4	–	3	5	–	4
North Central (IL)	4	–	3	5	–	4
Millikin	4	–	3	4	–	5
Wheaton (IL)	4	–	3	4	–	5
Elmhurst	1	–	6	1	–	8
North Park	0	–	7	0	–	9
$ – Conference champion

1997 Eastern Collegiate Football Conference standings
	Conf.			Overall
Team	W		L	W		L
Salve Regina $	4	–	0	7	–	2
Western New England	3	–	1	4	–	3
MIT	2	–	2	5	–	4
Nichols	1	–	3	2	–	7
Curry	0	–	4	0	–	10
$ – Conference champion

1997 Freedom Football Conference standings
	Conf.			Overall
Team	W		L	W		L
Coast Guard $^	6	–	0	9	–	2
Merchant Marine	4	–	2	7	–	2
Plymouth State	4	–	2	7	–	3
Springfield (MA)	3	–	3	4	–	5
WPI	2	–	4	4	–	6
Western Connecticut	1	–	5	4	–	6
Norwich	1	–	5	2	–	8
$ – Conference champion; ^ – NCAA Division III playoff participant

1997 Illini–Badger Football Conference standings
	Conf.			Overall
Team	W		L	W		L
Lakeland $	5	–	0	10	–	0
Concordia (WI)	4	–	1	7	–	3
MacMurray	3	–	2	8	–	2
Eureka	2	–	3	5	–	5
Concordia (IL)	1	–	4	2	–	7
Greenville	0	–	5	2	–	8
$ – Conference champion

1997 Indiana Collegiate Athletic Conference football standings
	Conf.			Overall
Team	W		L	W		L
Hanover $^	6	–	0	10	–	1
DePauw	5	–	1	8	–	2
Wabash	4	–	2	6	–	4
Manchester	2	–	4	6	–	4
Rose–Hulman	2	–	4	3	–	7
Anderson (IN)	1	–	5	2	–	8
Franklin (IN)	1	–	5	2	–	8
$ – Conference champion; ^ – NCAA Division III playoff participant

1997 Iowa Conference football standings
	Conf.			Overall
Team	W		L	W		L
Simpson (IA) $^	8	–	0	12	–	1
Central (IA)	7	–	1	8	–	2
Upper Iowa	5	–	3	7	–	3
Wartburg	5	–	3	7	–	3
Loras	4	–	4	6	–	4
Luther	3	–	5	4	–	6
Buena Vista	3	–	5	3	–	7
Dubuque	1	–	7	3	–	7
William Penn	0	–	8	1	–	9
Coe	0	–	0	8	–	1
Cornell (IA)	0	–	0	6	–	3
$ – Conference champion; ^ – NCAA Division III playoff participant

1997 Michigan Intercollegiate Athletic Association football standings
	Conf.			Overall
Team	W		L	W		L
Adrian +	4	–	1	8	–	1
Hope +	4	–	1	6	–	3
Albion	3	–	2	6	–	3
Alma	3	–	2	6	–	3
Kalamazoo	1	–	4	3	–	6
Olivet	0	–	5	3	–	6
+ – Conference co-champions

1997 Middle Atlantic Conference football standings
	Conf.			Overall
Team	W		L	W		L
Commonwealth
Albright x	5	–	0	8	–	1
Moravian	4	–	1	7	–	3
Widener	3	–	2	7	–	3
Susquehanna	2	–	3	6	–	4
Juniata	1	–	4	3	–	7
Lebanon Valley	0	–	5	0	–	10
Freedom
Lycoming x^	4	–	0	12	–	1
Wilkes	3	–	1	5	–	5
Delaware Valley	2	–	2	5	–	5
King's (PA)	1	–	3	3	–	7
Fairleigh Dickinson–Florham	0	–	4	0	–	10
x – Division champion/co-champions; ^ – NCAA Division III playoff participant

1997 Midwest Conference football standings
	Conf.			Overall
Team	W		L	W		L
North Division
Ripon x	4	–	1	6	–	3
Carroll (WI) xy$	4	–	1	5	–	5
Lawrence	2	–	3	4	–	5
St. Norbert	2	–	3	4	–	5
Beloit	2	–	3	3	–	6
Lake Forest	1	–	4	2	–	7
South Division
Grinnell xy	3	–	0	5	–	5
Knox	2	–	1	5	–	4
Monmouth (IL)	1	–	2	2	–	7
Illinois College	0	–	3	1	–	8
Championship: Carroll (WI) 20, Grinnell 15
$ – Conference champion; x – Division champion/co-champions; y – Championship game participant

1997 Minnesota Intercollegiate Athletic Conference football standings
	Conf.					Overall
Team	W		L		T	W		L		T
Augsburg $^	8	–	1	–	0	10	–	2	–	0
St. Thomas (MN)	7	–	2	–	0	8	–	2	–	0
Concordia–Moorhead ^	7	–	2	–	0	8	–	3	–	0
Saint John's (MN)	6	–	3	–	0	6	–	4	–	0
Bethel (MN)	5	–	4	–	0	6	–	4	–	0
Gustavus Adolphus	5	–	4	–	0	6	–	4	–	0
Hamline	4	–	5	–	0	5	–	5	–	0
St. Olaf	2	–	7	–	0	2	–	8	–	0
Carleton	1	–	8	–	0	2	–	8	–	0
Macalester	0	–	9	–	0	1	–	9	–	0
$ – Conference champion; ^ – NCAA Division III playoff participant

1997 New England Football Conference standings
	Conf.			Overall
Team	W		L	W		L
Worcester State +	7	–	1	8	–	3
Bridgewater State +	7	–	1	7	–	3
UMass Dartmouth	6	–	2	8	–	2
Maine Maritime	4	–	4	4	–	6
Westfield State	4	–	4	4	–	6
UMass–Boston	3	–	5	3	–	6
Massachusetts Maritime	3	–	5	3	–	7
Fitchburg State	1	–	7	3	–	7
Framingham State	1	–	7	2	–	8
+ – Conference co-champions

1997 New England Small College Athletic Conference football standings
	Conf.			Overall
Team	W		L	W		L
Amherst	7	–	1	7	–	1
Wesleyan	7	–	1	7	–	1
Williams	7	–	1	7	–	1
Trinity (CT)	5	–	3	5	–	3
Bowdoin	4	–	4	4	–	4
Middlebury	4	–	4	4	–	4
Tufts	3	–	5	3	–	5
Hamilton	2	–	6	2	–	6
Bates	1	–	7	1	–	7
Colby	0	–	8	0	–	8
No conference champion recognized

1997 New Jersey Athletic Conference football standings
	Conf.			Overall
Team	W		L	W		L
Rowan $^	5	–	0	11	–	1
TCNJ ^	4	–	1	9	–	3
Montclair State	3	–	2	6	–	4
Jersey City State	2	–	3	5	–	5
Kean	1	–	4	1	–	9
William Paterson	0	–	5	0	–	10
$ – Conference champion; ^ – NCAA Division III playoff participant

1997 North Coast Athletic Conference football standings
	Conf.			Overall
Team	W		L	W		L
Wittenberg +	7	–	1	9	–	1
Wooster +	7	–	1	9	–	1
Allegheny +^	7	–	1	9	–	2
Denison	3	–	4	4	–	6
Ohio Wesleyan	3	–	4	4	–	6
Kenyon	3	–	5	3	–	7
Case Western Reserve	2	–	4	3	–	7
Earlham	2	–	6	2	–	8
Oberlin	0	–	8	1	–	9
+ – Conference co-champions; ^ – NCAA Division III playoff participant

1997 Northwest Conference football standings
	Conf.			Overall
Team	W		L	W		L
No. 2 Willamette $^	5	–	0	13	–	1
No. 19 Linfield	4	–	1	6	–	3
No. 17 Pacific Lutheran	3	–	2	7	–	2
Lewis & Clark	2	–	3	3	–	6
Whitworth	1	–	4	2	–	7
Puget Sound	0	–	5	2	–	7
$ – Conference champion; ^ – NAIA playoff participant; Rankings from NAIA poll

1997 Ohio Athletic Conference football standings
	Conf.			Overall
Team	W		L	W		L
Mount Union $^	9	–	0	14	–	0
John Carroll ^	8	–	1	10	–	2
Ohio Northern	7	–	2	8	–	2
Baldwin–Wallace	6	–	3	7	–	3
Heidelberg	5	–	4	5	–	5
Marietta	3	–	6	4	–	6
Capital	2	–	7	3	–	7
Muskingum	2	–	7	2	–	8
Otterbein	2	–	7	2	–	8
Hiram	1	–	8	2	–	8
$ – Conference champion; ^ – NCAA Division III playoff participant

1997 Old Dominion Athletic Conference football standings
	Conf.			Overall
Team	W		L	W		L
Emory & Henry +	4	–	1	8	–	2
Guilford +	4	–	1	8	–	2
Randolph–Macon +	4	–	1	8	–	2
Washington and Lee	2	–	3	4	–	6
Bridgewater	1	–	4	2	–	8
Hampden–Sydney	0	–	5	0	–	10
+ – Conference co-champions

1997 Presidents' Athletic Conference football standings
	Conf.					Overall
Team	W		L		T	W		L		T
Grove City $	5	–	0	–	0	9	–	1	–	0
Washington & Jefferson	4	–	1	–	0	6	–	3	–	0
Waynesburg	3	–	2	–	0	5	–	4	–	0
Bethany (WV)	2	–	3	–	0	4	–	6	–	0
Alfred	1	–	4	–	0	2	–	8	–	0
Thiel	0	–	5	–	0	1	–	9	–	0
$ – Conference champion

1997 Southern California Intercollegiate Athletic Conference football standings
	Conf.			Overall
Team	W		L	W		L
Redlands +	4	–	1	7	–	2
Cal Lutheran +	4	–	1	5	–	4
Whittier +	4	–	1	5	–	4
La Verne	2	–	3	2	–	7
Occidental	1	–	4	1	–	8
Claremont-Mudd	0	–	5	0	–	9
+ – Conference co-champions

1997 Southern Collegiate Athletic Conference football standings
	Conf.			Overall
Team	W		L	W		L
Trinity (TX) $^	4	–	0	10	–	1
Centre	3	–	1	6	–	3
Sewanee	1	–	3	5	–	4
Millsaps	1	–	3	3	–	7
Rhodes	1	–	3	2	–	7
$ – Conference champion; ^ – NCAA Division III playoff participant

1997 St. Louis Intercollegiate Athletic Conference football standings
	Conf.			Overall
Team	W		L	W		L
MacMurray $	4	–	0	8	–	2
Westminster (MO)	3	–	1	6	–	4
Greenville	2	–	2	2	–	8
Blackburn	1	–	3	1	–	8
Principia	0	–	4	0	–	8
$ – Conference champion

1997 Upstate Collegiate Athletic Association football standings
	Conf.			Overall
Team	W		L	W		L
RPI $	4	–	0	9	–	1
Union (NY)	3	–	1	7	–	2
Hobart	2	–	2	6	–	4
St. Lawrence	1	–	3	2	–	7
Rochester (NY)	0	–	4	1	–	8
$ – Conference champion

1997 Wisconsin Intercollegiate Athletic Conference football standings
	Conf.			Overall
Team	W		L	W		L
Wisconsin–Whitewater $^	7	–	0	9	–	1
Wisconsin–La Crosse	5	–	2	7	–	2
Wisconsin–Stout	5	–	2	6	–	4
Wisconsin–Eau Claire	4	–	3	7	–	3
Wisconsin–Stevens Point	3	–	4	6	–	4
Wisconsin–River Falls	3	–	4	5	–	5
Wisconsin–Oshkosh	1	–	6	3	–	7
Wisconsin–Platteville	0	–	7	1	–	9
$ – Conference champion; ^ – NCAA Division III playoff participant

1997 NCAA Division III independents football records
	Conf.			Overall
Team	W		L	W		L
Catholic University ^		–		10	–	1
Methodist		–		9	–	1
Cortland ^		–		8	–	2
Buffalo State		–		7	–	2
Hartwick		–		7	–	2
Pomona-Pitzer		–		6	–	2
Ithaca		–		7	–	3
Wesley		–		7	–	3
Frostburg State		–		6	–	3
Brockport		–		6	–	4
Menlo		–		5	–	5
Thomas More		–		5	–	5
Aurora		–		4	–	5
Chapman		–		4	–	5
Bluffton		–		4	–	6
Ferrum		–		4	–	6
Wilmington (OH)		–		4	–	6
Colorado College		–		3	–	6
Salisbury State		–		3	–	6
Maryville (TN)		–		3	–	7
Chowan		–		2	–	8
Defiance		–		1	–	8
^ – NCAA Division III playoff participant

== Conference champions ==
Conference champions
- American Southwest Conference – Mississippi College
- Centennial Conference – Western Maryland
- College Conference of Illinois and Wisconsin – Augustana (IL)
- Freedom Football Conference – Coast Guard
- Illini-Badger Football Conference – Lakeland
- Indiana Collegiate Athletic Conference – Hanover
- Iowa Intercollegiate Athletic Conference – Simpson
- Michigan Intercollegiate Athletic Association – Adrian
- Middle Atlantic Conference – Albright and Lycoming
- Midwest Conference – Carroll (WI)
- Minnesota Intercollegiate Athletic Conference – Augsburg
- New England Football Conference – Bridgewater State and Worcester State
- New Jersey Athletic Conference – Rowan
- North Coast Athletic Conference – Allegheny, Wittenberg, and Wooster
- Northwest Conference – Willamette
- Ohio Athletic Conference – Mount Union
- Old Dominion Athletic Conference – Emory & Henry, Guilford, and Randolph-Macon
- Presidents' Athletic Conference – Grove City
- Southern California Intercollegiate Athletic Conference – Cal Lutheran, Redlands, and Whittier
- Southern Collegiate Athletic Conference – Trinity (TX)
- University Athletic Association – Carnegie Mellon
- Upper Midwest Athletic Conference – Not available
- Upstate Collegiate Athletic Conference – RPI
- Wisconsin Intercollegiate Athletic Conference – Wisconsin–Whitewater

== Postseason ==
The 1997 NCAA Division III Football Championship playoffs were the 25th annual single-elimination tournament to determine the national champion of men's NCAA Division III college football. The championship Stagg Bowl game was held at Salem Football Stadium in Salem, Virginia for the second time. As of 2014, Salem has remained the yearly host of the Stagg Bowl. Like the previous twelve tournaments, this year's bracket featured sixteen teams.

=== Playoff bracket ===
Regionals; Campus Sites
Mount Union	34
Allegheny	30
John Carroll	30
Hanover	20
Simpson	34
Wisconsin–Whitewater	31
Augsburg	34
Concordia–Moorhead	22
Lycoming	27
Western Maryland	13
Trinity (TX)	44
Catholic University	33
Rowan	43
Coast Guard	0
TCNJ	34
Cortland	30

Quarterfinals; Campus Sites
Mount Union	59
John Carroll	7
Simpson	61
Augsburg	21
Lycoming	46
Trinity (TX)	26
Rowan	13
TCNJ	7

Semifinals; Campus Sites
Mount Union	54
Simpson	7
Lycoming	28
Rowan	20

National Championship Game; Salem Football Stadium; Salem, Virginia
Mount Union	61
Lycoming	12

== See also ==
- 1997 NCAA Division I-A football season
- 1997 NCAA Division I-AA football season
- 1997 NCAA Division II football season
