= Wisconsin–Platteville Pioneers football =

2024 Wisconsin–Platteville Pioneers football team
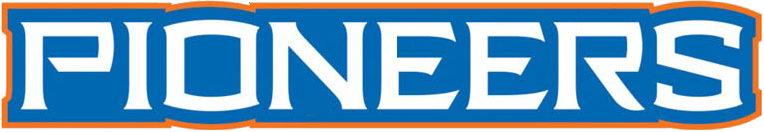
- First season: 1895; 131 years ago
- Head coach: Ryan Munz; 4th season, 30–14 (.682)
- Location: Platteville, Wisconsin
- Stadium: Ralph E. Davis Pioneer Stadium
- NCAA division: Division III
- Conference: WIAC
- Colors
- All-time record: 445–449–33 (.498)
- Playoff record: 2–5 (.286)
- Bowl record: 1–0 (1.000)

Conference championships
- WIAC: 15 (1938, 1941, 1942, 1952, 1953, 1956, 1957, 1968, 1969, 1970, 1971, 1974, 1976, 1980, 2024)
- Website: letsgopioneers.com/football

The Wisconsin–Platteville Pioneers football program is the intercollegiate American football team for the University of Wisconsin–Platteville located in Platteville, Wisconsin. The team competes at the NCAA Division III level and is a member of the Wisconsin Intercollegiate Athletic Conference (WIAC).

== Championships ==
=== Conference championships ===
The Pioneers have won the WIAC championship 15 times.

Year	Coach	Overall record	WIAC record
1938†	Lester Leitl	4–1	3–1
1941†	Lester Leitl	3–0–2	3–0–1
1942†	Lester Leitl	3–1–1	3–0–1
1952†	Lester Leitl	5–1	4–0
1953†	Lester Leitl	6–0	4–0
1956†	Lester Leitl	6–1	5–0
1957	Lester Leitl	5–1	5–0
1968†	Monte Charles	8–1	7–1
1969†	Gil Krueger	8–1	7–1
1970	Gil Krueger	10–1	8–0
1971†	Gil Krueger	9–1	7–1
1974†	Bob Seamans	8–2	7–1
1976†	Bob Seamans	8–2	6–2
1980†	George Chryst	7–3	6–2
2024	Ryan Munz	9–2	6–1

† Co-champions

== Postseason appearances ==
=== NCAA Division III playoffs ===
The Pioneers have made five appearances in the NCAA Division III playoffs, with a combined record of 2–4.

Year	Round	Opponent	Result
2013	First Round; Second Round	Concordia (WI); North Central (IL)	W, 54–20; L, 24–52
2016	First Round	Saint John's (MN)	L, 31–32
2024	Second Round	Wartburg	L, 14–19
2025	Second Round; Third Round	Alma; Bethel (MN)	W, 24–7; L, 24–35
2026	Second Round	Hope	TBP

=== NAIA Division I playoffs ===
The Pioneers have made one appearance in the NAIA Division I playoffs, with a combined record of 0–1.

Year	Round	Rival	Result
1970	Semifinals	Texas A&I	L, 0–16

=== Bowl games ===
The Pioneers have a 1–0 bowl record after participating in the Culver's Isthmus Bowl in 2023.

Year	Bowl	Coach	Rival	Result	Record
2023	Isthmus Bowl	Ryan Munz	Augustana (IL)	W 36–10	7–4

== Ranked teams ==
Starting in 1999, the American Football Coaches Association (AFCA) began publishing rankings for Division III football. In 2003, D3football.com started publishing its own rankings for Division III football. Since the inception of both polls, Wisconsin–Platteville has been ranked at least six times in the AFCA Coaches Poll and six times in the D3football.com poll to end the season. Additionally, while not being ranked in the Top 25 to end the season, the Pioneers have received votes (RV) at least four times in the AFCA Coaches Poll and three times in the D3football.com poll.

Year	D3	AFCA	Record
2012	13	16	8–2
2013	9	8	10–2
2014	RV	RV	7–3
2015	14	15	8–2
2016	14	16	8–3
2017	RV	RV	7–3
2019	NR	RV	7–3
2023	RV	RV	7–4
2024	16	17	9–2
2025	10	11	9–3

== Border Battle ==
From 1984 to 2000, the Hubert H. Humphrey Metrodome, home to the Minnesota Vikings and Minnesota Golden Gophers, hosted games in November between WIAC teams and Northern Sun Intercollegiate Conference (NSIC) teams at the NCAA Division II level in what came to be known as the "Border Battle". The Pioneers played at the Metrodome three times and had a 1–2 record.

Date	Opponent	Result
November 18, 1984	Minnesota Duluth	L 0–10
November 14, 1999	Minnesota Morris	W 46–15
November 11, 2000	Southwest Minnesota State	L 30–52

== Facilities ==
From 1984 to 2001, the Chicago Bears of the National Football League used the Pioneers facilities for the team's annual preseason training camp. The Bears were looking at Platteville, as well as Wisconsin–Whitewater, but ultimately chose Platteville after a tour with legendary coach and athletic director George Chryst. The Bears cited strong facilities, as well as fewer distractions for the team due to the remoteness of Platteville. The decision seemed to have paid off, as the 1985 Bears went on to win Super Bowl XX. Five other NFL teams used campuses across Wisconsin and Minnesota for training camp, in what was known as the Cheese League.

== Notable players ==
- Dan Arnold
- Geep Chryst
- Rob Erickson
- Mike Hintz
- Matt Janus
- Phil Micech
- Ryan Munz
- Forrest Perkins
