= Wisconsin–Eau Claire Blugolds football =

American college football team

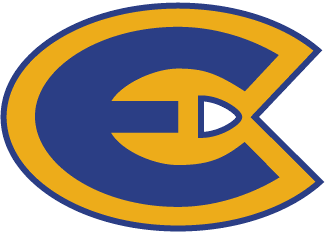
- First season: 1917; 109 years ago
- Head coach: Rob Erickson; 3rd season, 7–23 (.233)
- Location: Eau Claire, Wisconsin
- Stadium: Carson Park (capacity: 6,500)
- NCAA division: Division III
- Conference: WIAC
- Colors: Blue and gold
- All-time record: 409–474–34 (.465)
- Playoff record: 3–2 (.600)

Conference championships
- WIAC: 9 (1922, 1948, 1956, 1963, 1964, 1981, 1983, 1998, 2001)
- Rivalries: Wisconsin–Stout Blue Devils; Wisconsin–La Crosse Eagles
- Website: blugolds.com/football

The Wisconsin–Eau Claire Blugolds football program is the intercollegiate American football team for the University of Wisconsin–Eau Claire located in the U.S. state of Wisconsin. Wisconsin–Eau Claire competes at the NCAA Division III level and is a member of the Wisconsin Intercollegiate Athletic Conference (WIAC).

== Championships ==
=== Conference championships ===
Wisconsin–Eau Claire has won the Wisconsin Intercollegiate Athletic Conference (WIAC) championship 9 times.

Year	Conference	Overall Record	Conference Record	Coach
1922†	WIAC	5–1	2–1	George Simpson
1948	WIAC	6–1	5–1	Ade Olson
1956†	WIAC	7–1	7–0	Ade Olson
1963	WIAC	7–0	6–0	Jim Rice
1964	WIAC	7–2	7–1	Jim Rice
1981	WIAC	9–1	8–0	Link Walker
1983	WIAC	8–2	7–1	Link Walker
1998†	WIAC	10–3	5–2	Bob Nielson
2001†	WIAC	8–2	5–2	Todd Hoffner

† Co-champions

== Postseason appearances ==
=== NCAA Division III playoffs ===
The Blugolds have made two appearances in the NCAA Division III playoffs, with a combined record of 3–2.

Season	Coach	Playoff	Opponent	Result	Record
1998	Bob Nielson	Regionals	Central (IA)	W 28–21	10–3
1998	Bob Nielson	Quarterfinals	Saint John's (MN)	W 10–7	10–3
1998	Bob Nielson	Semifinals	Rowan	L 19–22	10–3
2007	Todd Glaser	First Round	St. Norbert	W 24–20	9–3
2007	Todd Glaser	Second Round	Bethel (MN)	L 12–21	9–3

== List of head coaches ==
Coach	Tenure	Seasons	Wins	Losses	Ties	Pct.	Conf. championships	Playoffs/bowls
O. L. Loop	1917	1	0	2	0	.000		
William C. Phillips	1919	1	3	1	1	.700		
George Simpson	1920–1924	5	20	6	2	.750	1 (1922)	
Erwin C. Gerber	1925–1927	3	7	7	3	.500		
Bill Zorn (a)	1928–1940	13	28	47	14	.393		
William C. Phillips	1941	1	0	5	2	.143		
Bill Zorn (b)	1942	1	0	6	0	.000		
Cliff Fagan	1944–1946	3	5	10	2	.647		
Ade Olson	1947–1956	10	42	34	3	.551	2 (1948, 1956)	
James J. Rice	1957–1967	11	41	48	3	.462	2 (1963, 1964)	
Link Walker	1968–1986	19	104	84	3	.552	2 (1981, 1983)	
Jim Lind	1987–1991	5	22	27	1	.452		
Greg Polnasek	1992–1995	4	11	28	0	.282		
Bob Nielson	1996–1998	3	22	11	0	.667	1 (1998)	1 (1998)
Todd Hoffner	1999–2005	7	42	28	0	.600	1 (2001)	
Todd Glaser	2006–2015	10	40	62	0	.392		1 (2007)
Dan Larson	2016–2018	3	7	23	0	.233		
Wesley Beschorner	2019, 2021–2022	3	8	22	0	.267		
Rob Erickson	2023–present	3	7	23	0	.233		

== Year-by-year results ==
National champions	Conference champions	Bowl game berth	Playoff berth

Season	Head coach	Association	Division	Conference	Record							Postseason	Final ranking
Season	Head coach	Association	Division	Conference	Overall			Conference				Postseason	Final ranking
Season	Head coach	Association	Division	Conference	Win	Loss	Tie	Finish	Win	Loss	Tie	Postseason	Final ranking
Wisconsin–Eau Claire Blugolds
1917	O. L. Loop	NCAA	—	WIAC	0	2	0	9th	0	2	0	—	—
1918	–	NCAA	—	WIAC	–								
1919	William C. Phillips	NCAA	—	WIAC	3	1	1	T–4th	2	1	1	—	—
1920	George Simpson	NCAA	—	WIAC	4	0	0	2nd	2	0	0	—	—
1921	George Simpson	NCAA	—	WIAC	2	2	1	7th	1	2	1	—	—
1922	George Simpson	NCAA	—	WIAC	5	1	0	T–1st	2	1	0	—	—
1923	George Simpson	NCAA	—	WIAC	4	2	0	T–5th	3	1	1	—	—
1924	George Simpson	NCAA	—	WIAC	5	2	0	T–6th	2	2	0	—	—
1925	Erwin C. Gerber	NCAA	—	WIAC	4	2	1	3rd	3	1	0	—	—
1926	Erwin C. Gerber	NCAA	—	WIAC	1	3	2	8th	0	2	2	—	—
1927	Erwin C. Gerber	NCAA	—	WIAC	2	2	0	T–5th	1	2	0	—	—
1928	Bill Zorn	NCAA	—	WIAC	0	5	0	9th	0	4	0	—	—
1929	Bill Zorn	NCAA	—	WIAC	3	1	1	T–3rd	2	1	1	—	—
1930	Bill Zorn	NCAA	—	WIAC	3	3	1	6th	1	2	1	—	—
1931	Bill Zorn	NCAA	—	WIAC	1	5	1	8th	1	3	1	—	—
1932	Bill Zorn	NCAA	—	WIAC	4	3	0	6th	2	2	0	—	—
1933	Bill Zorn	NCAA	—	WIAC	1	4	2	9th	0	3	0	—	—
1934	Bill Zorn	NCAA	—	WIAC	5	2	1	4th (North)	1	2	1	—	—
1935	Bill Zorn	NCAA	—	WIAC	2	3	2	3rd (North)	1	1	2	—	—
1936	Bill Zorn	NCAA	—	WIAC	3	2	2	2nd (North)	2	1	1	—	—
1937	Bill Zorn	NCAA	—	WIAC	2	4	1	T–3rd (North)	1	2	1	—	—
1938	Bill Zorn	NCAA	—	WIAC	2	5	0	4th (North)	1	3	0	—	—
1939	Bill Zorn	NCAA	—	WIAC	2	5	0	3rd (North)	2	2	0	—	—
1940	Bill Zorn	NCAA	—	WIAC	0	5	3	T–4th (North)	0	3	2	—	—
1941	James Barnes	NCAA	—	WIAC	0	5	2	5th (North)	0	3	1	—	—
1942	Bill Zorn	NCAA	—	WIAC	0	6	0	5th (North)	0	4	0	—	—
1943	–	NCAA	—	WIAC	–								
1944	Cliff Fagan	NCAA	—	WIAC	0	4	0	–				—	—
1945	Cliff Fagan	NCAA	—	WIAC	2	4	0	–				—	—
1946	Cliff Fagan	NCAA	—	WIAC	3	2	2	T–4th (North)	1	2	1	—	—
1947	Ade Olson	NCAA	—	WIAC	2	6	0	5th (North)	1	4	0	—	—
1948	Ade Olson	NCAA	—	WIAC	6	1	0	1st	5	1	0	—	—
1949	Ade Olson	NCAA	—	WIAC	3	4	1	6th	2	3	1	—	—
1950	Ade Olson	NCAA	—	WIAC	3	4	1	9th	1	4	1	—	—
1951	Ade Olson	NCAA	—	WIAC	3	5	0	6th	2	4	0	—	—
1952	Ade Olson	NCAA	—	WIAC	2	5	1	8th	0	5	1	—	—
1953	Ade Olson	NCAA	—	WIAC	5	3	0	5th	4	3	0	—	—
1954	Ade Olson	NCAA	—	WIAC	6	2	0	3rd	5	2	0	—	—
1955	Ade Olson	NCAA	—	WIAC	5	3	0	4th	5	2	0	—	—
1956	Ade Olson	NAIA	—	WIAC	7	1	0	T–1st	7	0	0	—	—
1957	James J. Rice	NAIA	—	WIAC	3	5	0	5th	3	4	0	—	—
1958	James J. Rice	NAIA	—	WIAC	3	5	0	T–5th	3	3	0	—	—
1959	James J. Rice	NAIA	—	WIAC	2	5	1	T–7th	2	4	1	—	—
1960	James J. Rice	NAIA	—	WIAC	4	4	1	5th	4	3	1	—	—
1961	James J. Rice	NAIA	—	WIAC	4	5	0	7th	3	5	0	—	—
1962	James J. Rice	NAIA	—	WIAC	5	3	0	T–3rd	5	2	0	—	—
1963	James J. Rice	NAIA	—	WIAC	7	0	0	1st	6	0	0	—	—
1964	James J. Rice	NAIA	—	WIAC	7	2	0	1st	7	1	0		
1965	James J. Rice	NAIA	—	WIAC	2	6	0	7th	2	6	0	—	—
1966	James J. Rice	NAIA	—	WIAC	1	7	1	8th	1	7	0	—	—
1967	James J. Rice	NAIA	—	WIAC	3	6	0	T–7th	2	6	0	—	—
1968	Link Walker	NAIA	—	WIAC	3	4	2	5th	3	3	2	—	—
1969	Link Walker	NAIA	—	WIAC	5	4	0	T–3rd	5	3	0	—	—
1970	Link Walker	NAIA	Division I	WIAC	6	4	0	T–2nd	5	3	0	—	—
1971	Link Walker	NAIA	Division I	WIAC	6	4	0	T–4th	4	4	0	—	—
1972	Link Walker	NAIA	Division I	WIAC	3	7	0	T–6th	2	6	0	—	—
1973	Link Walker	NAIA	Division I	WIAC	5	5	0	T–4th	4	4	0	—	—
1974	Link Walker	NAIA	Division I	WIAC	6	4	0	5th	4	4	0	—	—
1975	Link Walker	NAIA	Division I	WIAC	4	6	0	T–5th	3	5	0	—	—
1976	Link Walker	NAIA	Division I	WIAC	5	5	0	6th	4	4	0	—	—
1977	Link Walker	NAIA	Division I	WIAC	5	6	0	T–5th	3	5	0	—	—
1978	Link Walker	NAIA	Division I	WIAC	8	2	0	3rd	6	2	0	—	—
1979 (Note: Originally went 5–5, forfeited two non-conference wins for use of ineligible player.)	Link Walker	NAIA	Division I	WIAC	3	7	0	T–6th	3	5	0	—	—
1980	Link Walker	NAIA	Division I	WIAC	3	8	0	T–7th	2	6	0	—	—
1981	Link Walker	NAIA	Division I	WIAC	9	1	0	1st	8	0	0	—	—
1982	Link Walker	NAIA	Division I	WIAC	6	4	0	T–2nd	6	2	0	—	—
1983	Link Walker	NAIA	Division I	WIAC	8	2	0	1st	7	1	0	—	—
1984	Link Walker	NAIA	Division II	WIAC	8	3	0	4th	5	3	0	—	—
1985	Link Walker	NAIA	Division II	WIAC	5	4	1	T–5th	3	4	1	—	—
1986	Link Walker	NCAA	Division III	WIAC	4	6	0	T–5th	3	5	0	—	—
1987	Jim Lind	NCAA	Division III	WIAC	6	4	0	T–3rd	5	3	0	—	—
1988	Jim Lind	NCAA	Division III	WIAC	5	5	0	7th	3	5	0	—	—
1989	Jim Lind	NCAA	Division III	WIAC	7	3	0	5th	5	3	0	—	—
1990	Jim Lind	NCAA	Division III	WIAC	2	8	0	T–8th	1	7	0	—	—
1991	Jim Lind	NCAA	Division III	WIAC	2	7	1	T–8th	1	6	1	—	—
1992	Greg Polnasek	NCAA	Division III	WIAC	4	5	0	6th	3	4	0	—	—
1993	Greg Polnasek	NCAA	Division III	WIAC	4	6	0	T–4th	3	4	0	—	—
1994	Greg Polnasek	NCAA	Division III	WIAC	2	8	0	T–7th	1	6	0	—	—
1995	Greg Polnasek	NCAA	Division III	WIAC	1	9	0	8th	0	7	0	—	—
1996	Bob Nielson	NCAA	Division III	WIAC	5	5	0	5th	3	4	0	—	—
1997	Bob Nielson	NCAA	Division III	WIAC	7	3	0	4th	4	3	0	—	—
1998	Bob Nielson	NCAA	Division III	WIAC	10	3	0	1st	5	2	0	Playoff berth	—
1999	Todd Hoffner	NCAA	Division III	WIAC	2	8	0	T–6th	2	5	0	—	—
2000	Todd Hoffner	NCAA	Division III	WIAC	6	4	0	4th	4	3	0	—	—
2001	Todd Hoffner	NCAA	Division III	WIAC	8	2	0	T–1st	5	2	0	—	—
2002	Todd Hoffner	NCAA	Division III	WIAC	8	2	0	2nd	5	2	0	—	—
2003	Todd Hoffner	NCAA	Division III	WIAC	5	5	0	T–4th	4	3	0	—	—
2004	Todd Hoffner	NCAA	Division III	WIAC	7	3	0	T–2nd	4	3	0	—	—
2005	Todd Hoffner	NCAA	Division III	WIAC	6	4	0	T–2nd	5	2	0	—	—
2006	Todd Glaser	NCAA	Division III	WIAC	3	7	0	T–6th	2	5	0	—	—
2007	Todd Glaser	NCAA	Division III	WIAC	9	3	0	2nd	5	2	0	Playoff berth	12
2008	Todd Glaser	NCAA	Division III	WIAC	6	4	0	3rd	4	3	0	—	—
2009	Todd Glaser	NCAA	Division III	WIAC	6	4	0	4th	4	3	0	—	—
2010	Todd Glaser	NCAA	Division III	WIAC	4	6	0	7th	2	5	0	—	—
2011	Todd Glaser	NCAA	Division III	WIAC	5	5	0	T–4th	3	4	0	—	—
2012	Todd Glaser	NCAA	Division III	WIAC	4	6	0	4th	4	3	0	—	—
2013	Todd Glaser	NCAA	Division III	WIAC	2	8	0	T–6th	2	5	0	—	—
2014	Todd Glaser	NCAA	Division III	WIAC	1	9	0	8th	1	6	0	—	—
2015	Todd Glaser	NCAA	Division III	WIAC	0	10	0	8th	0	7	0	—	—
2016	Dan Larson	NCAA	Division III	WIAC	2	8	0	8th	1	6	0	—	—
2017	Dan Larson	NCAA	Division III	WIAC	1	9	0	8th	0	7	0	—	—
2018	Dan Larson	NCAA	Division III	WIAC	4	6	0	6th	2	5	0	—	—
2019	Wesley Beschorner	NCAA	Division III	WIAC	3	7	0	7th	1	6	0	—	—
2020	Wesley Beschorner	NCAA	Division III	WIAC	–								
2021	Wesley Beschorner	NCAA	Division III	WIAC	3	7	0	7th	1	6	0	—	—
2022	Wesley Beschorner	NCAA	Division III	WIAC	2	8	0	7th	1	6	0	—	—
2023	Rob Erickson	NCAA	Division III	WIAC	2	8	0	7th	1	6	0	—	—
2024	Rob Erickson	NCAA	Division III	WIAC	2	8	0	7th	1	6	0	—	—
2025	Rob Erickson	NCAA	Division III	WIAC	2	8	0	7th	1	6	0	—	—

== Notable former players ==
Notable alumni include:

- Roman Brumm
- Kevin Fitzgerald
- D. J. LeRoy
- Lee Weigel
