= 1976 Wisconsin–La Crosse Indians football team =

American college football season

1976 Wisconsin–La Crosse Indians football
- Conference: Wisconsin State University Conference
- Record: 7–3 (5–3 WSUC)
- Head coach: Roger Harring (8th season)
- Home stadium: Veterans Memorial Stadium

1976 Wisconsin State University Conference football standings
	Conf.					Overall
Team	W		L		T	W		L		T
No. 15 Wisconsin–Oshkosh +	6	–	2	–	0	8	–	2	–	0
No. 13 Wisconsin–Platteville +	6	–	2	–	0	8	–	2	–	0
Wisconsin–River Falls +	6	–	2	–	0	7	–	3	–	0
Wisconsin–La Crosse	5	–	3	–	0	7	–	3	–	0
Wisconsin–Stevens Point	5	–	3	–	0	7	–	3	–	0
Wisconsin–Eau Claire	4	–	4	–	0	5	–	5	–	0
Wisconsin–Stout	2	–	6	–	0	3	–	6	–	0
Wisconsin–Whitewater	2	–	6	–	0	2	–	9	–	0
Wisconsin–Superior	0	–	8	–	0	0	–	10	–	0
+ – Conference co-champions; Rankings from NAIA Division I poll

The 1976 Wisconsin–La Crosse Indians football team was an American football team that represented the University of Wisconsin–La Crosse as a member of the Wisconsin State University Conference (WSUC) during the 1976 NAIA Division I football season.

== Schedule ==
Date	Opponent	Site	Result	Attendance	Source
September 11	at Upper Iowa*	Fayette, Iowa	W 64–0		
September 18	at Wisconsin–Oshkosh	Titan Stadium; Oshkosh, WI	W 22–10		
September 25	Wisconsin–Platteville	Veterans Memorial Stadium; La Crosse, WI	L 26–28		
October 2	at Wisconsin–Stevens Point	Goerke Field; Stevens Point, WI	L 7–31		
October 9	at Winona State*	Maxwell Field at Warrior Stadium; Winona, MN	W 28–7		
October 16	Wisconsin–Stout	Veterans Memorial Stadium; La Crosse, WI	W 23–7		
October 23	at Wisconsin–River Falls	River Falls, WI	L 14–16		
October 30	Wisconsin–Superior	Veterans Memorial Stadium; La Crosse, WI	W 48–0		
November 6	at Wisconsin–Whitewater	Warhawks Stadium; Whitewater, WI	W 16–7	2,600	
November 13	Wisconsin–Eau Claire	Veterans Memorial Stadium; La Crosse, WI	W 27–7		
*Non-conference game

== Roster ==
1976 Wisconsin–La Crosse Indians football team roster
Players			Coaches
Offense: Pos. / # / Name / Class	Defense: Pos. / # / Name / Class; LB / 61 / Joel Williams / So	Special teams: Pos. / # / Name / Class	Head coach: Roger Harring; Coordinators/assistant coaches Legend: (C) Team captain; (S) Suspended; (I) Ineligible; Injured; Redshirt
