= 1979 NCAA Division III football season =

American college football season

- Regular season: August – November 1979
- Playoffs: November – December 1979
- National championship: Garrett-Harrison Stadium; Phenix City, AL
- Champion: Ithaca

The 1979 NCAA Division III football season, part of college football in the United States organized by the National Collegiate Athletic Association at the Division III level, began in August 1979, and concluded with the NCAA Division III Football Championship in December 1979 at Garrett-Harrison Stadium in Phenix City, Alabama. The Ithaca Bombers won their first Division III championship, defeating the Wittenberg Tigers by a final score of 14−10 in a re-match of the 1975 championship (won by Wittenberg).

== Conference changes and new programs ==
School	1978 conference	1979 conference
FDU–Florham	D-III Independent	Middle Atlantic
Central Florida	New program	D-III Independent
Duquesne	Revived program	D-III Independent
Miles	SIAC	Dropped Program
Plattsburgh	Independent	Dropped Program
Western Connecticut	Independent (NAIA)	NEFC

== Conference standings ==
1979 College Athletic Conference football standings
	Conf.					Overall
Team	W		L		T	W		L		T
Sewanee +	3	–	1	–	0	7	–	2	–	0
Rose–Hulman +	3	–	1	–	0	6	–	4	–	0
Southwestern (TN) +	3	–	1	–	0	4	–	6	–	0
Centre	1	–	3	–	0	1	–	8	–	0
Principia	0	–	4	–	0	1	–	8	–	0
+ – Conference co-champions

1979 College Conference of Illinois and Wisconsin football standings
	Conf.					Overall
Team	W		L		T	W		L		T
Millikin $	7	–	1	–	0	8	–	1	–	0
Elmhurst	6	–	2	–	0	7	–	2	–	0
No. 11 Illinois Wesleyan	6	–	2	–	0	7	–	2	–	0
Augustana (IL)	5	–	3	–	0	6	–	3	–	0
North Central (IL)	5	–	3	–	0	6	–	3	–	0
North Park	4	–	4	–	0	4	–	5	–	0
Carroll (WI)	2	–	6	–	0	2	–	7	–	0
Wheaton (IL)	1	–	7	–	0	1	–	8	–	0
Carthage	0	–	8	–	0	0	–	8	–	1
$ – Conference champion; Rankings from NAIA Division II poll

1979 Independent College Athletic Conference football standings
	Conf.					Overall
Team	W		L		T	W		L		T
Ithaca $^	2	–	0	–	0	11	–	2	–	0
Alfred	2	–	1	–	0	7	–	2	–	0
Hobart	2	–	1	–	0	4	–	5	–	0
St. Lawrence	1	–	3	–	0	3	–	6	–	0
RPI	0	–	2	–	0	3	–	4	–	1
$ – Conference champion; ^ – NCAA Division III playoff participant

1979 Iowa Conference football standings
	Conf.					Overall
Team	W		L		T	W		L		T
Dubuque $^	7	–	0	–	0	9	–	1	–	0
Buena Vista	6	–	1	–	0	7	–	2	–	0
Central (IA)	5	–	2	–	0	6	–	3	–	0
Wartburg	3	–	4	–	0	5	–	4	–	0
Luther	2	–	5	–	0	3	–	6	–	0
Simpson (IA)	2	–	5	–	0	3	–	6	–	0
William Penn	2	–	5	–	0	2	–	8	–	0
Upper Iowa	1	–	6	–	0	3	–	7	–	0
$ – Conference champion; ^ – NCAA Division III playoff participant

1979 Metropolitan Intercollegiate Conference football standings
	Conf.					Overall
Team	W		L		T	W		L		T
Pace $	5	–	0	–	0	7	–	1	–	1
St. John's	4	–	1	–	0	4	–	5	–	1
Iona	3	–	2	–	0	6	–	4	–	0
Marist	1	–	4	–	0	3	–	5	–	0
Saint Peter's	1	–	4	–	0	1	–	6	–	0
Brooklyn	1	–	4	–	0	1	–	8	–	0
$ – Conference champion

1979 Michigan Intercollegiate Athletic Association football standings
	Conf.					Overall
Team	W		L		T	W		L		T
Hope $	4	–	0	–	1	7	–	1	–	1
Adrian	3	–	1	–	1	6	–	2	–	1
Albion	3	–	2	–	0	4	–	5	–	0
Kalamazoo	2	–	3	–	0	5	–	3	–	0
Olivet	1	–	4	–	0	4	–	5	–	0
Alma	1	–	4	–	0	3	–	6	–	0
$ – Conference champion

1979 Middle Atlantic Conference football standings
	Conf.					Overall
Team	W		L		T	W		L		T
Northern Division
Lycoming x	6	–	0	–	1	8	–	1	–	1
Upsala	5	–	1	–	1	8	–	1	–	1
Juniata	4	–	3	–	0	5	–	4	–	0
Wilkes	4	–	3	–	0	4	–	4	–	0
Delaware Valley	3	–	4	–	0	5	–	4	–	0
Albright	3	–	4	–	0	3	–	6	–	0
Susquehanna	2	–	5	–	0	2	–	7	–	0
Fairleigh Dickinson–Florham	0	–	7	–	0	0	–	10	–	0
Southern Division
Widener x^	8	–	0	–	0	10	–	1	–	0
Franklin & Marshall	6	–	2	–	0	7	–	2	–	0
Western Maryland	6	–	2	–	0	7	–	2	–	0
Muhlenberg	4	–	3	–	1	5	–	3	–	1
Swarthmore	4	–	3	–	1	4	–	4	–	1
Johns Hopkins	4	–	4	–	0	5	–	4	–	0
Lebanon Valley	4	–	4	–	0	5	–	4	–	0
Gettysburg	4	–	4	–	0	5	–	6	–	0
Ursinus	2	–	6	–	0	3	–	6	–	0
Dickinson	1	–	7	–	0	1	–	8	–	0
Moravian	0	–	8	–	0	0	–	9	–	0
x – Division champion/co-champions; ^ – NCAA Division III playoff participant

1979 Midwest Conference football standings
	Conf.					Overall
Team	W		L		T	W		L		T
Red Division
Lawrence xy$	5	–	0	–	0	9	–	1	–	0
Cornell (IA)	4	–	1	–	0	7	–	2	–	0
Knox	2	–	3	–	0	4	–	4	–	0
Monmouth (IL)	2	–	3	–	0	3	–	5	–	0
Coe	1	–	4	–	0	4	–	5	–	0
Ripon	1	–	4	–	0	4	–	5	–	0
Blue Division
Carleton xy	4	–	0	–	0	4	–	5	–	0
Beloit	2	–	2	–	0	4	–	4	–	0
Lake Forest	2	–	2	–	0	3	–	5	–	0
Grinnell	1	–	3	–	0	2	–	6	–	0
Chicago	1	–	3	–	0	1	–	7	–	0
Championship: Lawrence 52, Carleton 7
$ – Conference champion; x – Division champion/co-champions; y – Championship game participant

1979 Minnesota Intercollegiate Athletic Conference football standings
	Conf.					Overall
Team	W		L		T	W		L		T
No. 13 Saint John's (MN) +	6	–	2	–	0	7	–	2	–	0
St. Olaf +	6	–	2	–	0	7	–	3	–	0
No. 15 Concordia–Moorhead +	6	–	2	–	0	6	–	3	–	0
No. 17 St. Thomas (MN) +	6	–	2	–	0	6	–	3	–	0
Gustavus Adolphus	5	–	3	–	0	7	–	3	–	0
Hamline	3	–	5	–	0	5	–	5	–	0
Augsburg	3	–	5	–	0	4	–	6	–	0
Bethel (MN)	1	–	7	–	0	2	–	8	–	0
Macalester	0	–	8	–	0	0	–	8	–	0
+ – Conference co-champions; Rankings from NAIA Division II poll

1979 New England Football Conference standings
	Conf.					Overall
Team	W		L		T	W		L		T
New Haven $	8	–	0	–	1	8	–	0	–	1
Framingham State	6	–	3	–	0	6	–	3	–	0
Nichols	6	–	3	–	0	6	–	3	–	0
Massachusetts Maritime	5	–	4	–	0	5	–	4	–	0
Boston State	4	–	5	–	0	4	–	5	–	0
Maine Maritime	4	–	5	–	0	4	–	5	–	0
Plymouth State	4	–	5	–	0	4	–	6	–	0
Bridgewater State	3	–	5	–	1	3	–	5	–	1
Curry	2	–	7	–	0	2	–	7	–	0
Western Connecticut State	1	–	8	–	0	1	–	8	–	0
$ – Conference champion

1979 New Jersey State Athletic Conference football standings
	Conf.					Overall
Team	W		L		T	W		L		T
Montclair State $	4	–	0	–	1	8	–	1	–	1
Trenton State	4	–	1	–	0	7	–	3	–	0
William Paterson	3	–	1	–	1	5	–	4	–	1
Glassboro State	2	–	3	–	0	2	–	8	–	0
Kean	1	–	4	–	0	4	–	5	–	1
Jersey City State	0	–	5	–	0	3	–	6	–	0
$ – Conference champion

1979 New England Small College Athletic Conference football standings
	Conf.					Overall
Team	W		L		T	W		L		T
Tufts	8	–	0	–	0	8	–	0	–	0
Bowdoin	5	–	2	–	0	5	–	3	–	0
Middlebury	4	–	2	–	0	5	–	3	–	0
Colby	4	–	3	–	0	5	–	3	–	0
Bates	3	–	3	–	0	5	–	3	–	0
Wesleyan	3	–	3	–	0	5	–	3	–	0
Amherst	3	–	3	–	0	3	–	5	–	0
Williams	3	–	4	–	0	4	–	4	–	0
Trinity (CT)	1	–	6	–	0	2	–	6	–	0
Hamilton	0	–	5	–	0	0	–	8	–	0
The NESCAC did not recognize an official conference champion until 2000

1979 Northern Intercollegiate Conference football standings
	Conf.					Overall
Team	W		L		T	W		L		T
Minnesota Duluth +	7	–	1	–	0	8	–	2	–	0
Moorhead State +	7	–	1	–	0	8	–	3	–	0
Minnesota Morris ^	6	–	2	–	0	9	–	2	–	0
St. Cloud State	5	–	3	–	0	5	–	6	–	0
Mankato State	4	–	4	–	0	5	–	5	–	0
Michigan Tech	4	–	4	–	0	4	–	6	–	0
Southwest State (MN)	2	–	6	–	0	4	–	7	–	0
Bemidji State	1	–	7	–	0	1	–	8	–	1
Winona State	0	–	8	–	0	0	–	11	–	0
+ – Conference co-champions; ^ – NCAA Division III playoff participant

1979 Ohio Athletic Conference football standings
	Conf.					Overall
Team	W		L		T	W		L		T
Blue Division
Wittenberg xy$^	5	–	0	–	0	11	–	1	–	0
Otterbein	4	–	1	–	0	6	–	3	–	0
Wooster	3	–	2	–	0	6	–	3	–	0
Capital	2	–	3	–	0	5	–	4	–	0
Muskingum	1	–	4	–	0	2	–	7	–	0
Marietta	0	–	5	–	0	2	–	7	–	0
Red Division
Baldwin–Wallace ^	4	–	1	–	0	8	–	2	–	0
Denison xy	4	–	1	–	0	7	–	2	–	0
Mount Union	3	–	2	–	0	7	–	2	–	0
Ohio Northern	3	–	2	–	0	5	–	3	–	1
Ohio Wesleyan	1	–	4	–	0	1	–	8	–	0
Heidelberg	0	–	5	–	0	1	–	8	–	0
Not competing for championship
Oberlin			–			3	–	6	–	0
Kenyon			–			2	–	7	–	0
Championship: Wittenberg 56, Denison 6
$ – Conference champion; x – Division champion/co-champions; y – Championship game participant; ^ – NCAA Division III playoff participant

1979 Old Dominion Athletic Conference football standings
	Conf.					Overall
Team	W		L		T	W		L		T
Randolph–Macon $	4	–	0	–	0	5	–	5	–	0
Emory & Henry	2	–	2	–	0	4	–	6	–	0
Hampden–Sydney	2	–	2	–	0	4	–	6	–	0
Bridgewater	1	–	3	–	0	4	–	5	–	0
Washington and Lee	1	–	3	–	0	4	–	6	–	0
$ – Conference champion

1979 Pennsylvania State Athletic Conference football standings
	Conf.					Overall
Team	W		L		T	W		L		T
East Division
Cheyney xy	4	–	1	–	0	9	–	2	–	0
Millersville x^	4	–	1	–	0	8	–	2	–	0
East Stroudsburg	3	–	2	–	0	7	–	3	–	0
Kutztown	3	–	2	–	0	6	–	3	–	0
Bloomsburg	1	–	4	–	0	2	–	8	–	0
Mansfield	0	–	5	–	0	0	–	9	–	0
West Division
Lock Haven xy$	6	–	0	–	0	9	–	2	–	0
Clarion	5	–	1	–	0	9	–	1	–	0
Indiana (PA)	3	–	3	–	0	7	–	3	–	0
Slippery Rock	2	–	4	–	0	3	–	6	–	0
Edinboro	2	–	4	–	0	4	–	6	–	0
Shippensburg	2	–	4	–	0	4	–	6	–	0
California (PA)	1	–	5	–	0	3	–	7	–	0
Championship: Lock Haven 48, Cheyney 14
$ – Conference champion; x – Division champion/co-champions; y – Championship game participant; ^ – NCAA Division III playoff participant

1979 Presidents' Athletic Conference football standings
	Conf.					Overall
Team	W		L		T	W		L		T
Carnegie Mellon $^	7	–	0	–	0	10	–	1	–	0
Bethany (WV)	5	–	2	–	0	6	–	2	–	0
Thiel	5	–	2	–	0	6	–	3	–	0
Allegheny	3	–	4	–	0	3	–	5	–	0
Hiram	3	–	4	–	0	3	–	5	–	0
John Carroll	3	–	4	–	0	3	–	6	–	0
Case Western Reserve	1	–	6	–	0	3	–	6	–	0
Washington & Jefferson	1	–	6	–	0	1	–	8	–	0
$ – Conference champion; ^ – NCAA Division III playoff participant

1979 Southern California Intercollegiate Athletic Conference football standings
	Conf.					Overall
Team	W		L		T	W		L		T
Claremont-Mudd $	4	–	1	–	0	6	–	3	–	0
Whittier	3	–	2	–	0	5	–	4	–	0
Redlands	3	–	2	–	0	3	–	6	–	0
La Verne	2	–	3	–	0	4	–	5	–	0
Pomona-Pitzer	2	–	3	–	0	3	–	5	–	0
Occidental	1	–	4	–	0	2	–	6	–	1
$ – Conference champion

1979 Southern Intercollegiate Athletic Conference football standings
	Conf.					Overall
Team	W		L		T	W		L		T
Division I
No. 9 Alabama A&M x^	5	–	0	–	0	8	–	3	–	0
Morris Brown	6	–	2	–	0	6	–	5	–	0
Tuskegee	3	–	2	–	0	5	–	6	–	0
Bethune-Cookman	1	–	3	–	0	5	–	6	–	0
Albany State	1	–	6	–	0	1	–	9	–	1
Division II
Morehouse x	6	–	2	–	0	6	–	3	–	0
Savannah State	5	–	2	–	1	6	–	3	–	1
Knoxville	2	–	4	–	0	6	–	4	–	0
Fort Valley State	4	–	4	–	1	4	–	4	–	1
Fisk	2	–	3	–	1	2	–	4	–	1
Clark	2	–	5	–	1	2	–	5	–	1
Lane	1	–	5	–	0	1	–	7	–	0
x – Division champion/co-champions; ^ – NCAA Division II playoff participant; Rankings from Associated Press poll

1979 Wisconsin State University Conference football standings
	Conf.					Overall
Team	W		L		T	W		L		T
No. 4 Wisconsin–River Falls $^	7	–	1	–	0	9	–	2	–	0
No. 20 Wisconsin–La Crosse	6	–	2	–	0	7	–	2	–	0
Wisconsin–Whitewater	6	–	2	–	0	7	–	4	–	0
Wisconsin–Stout	4	–	4	–	0	6	–	4	–	0
Wisconsin–Stevens Point	4	–	4	–	0	5	–	5	–	0
Wisconsin–Oshkosh	3	–	5	–	0	5	–	5	–	0
Wisconsin–Platteville	3	–	5	–	0	5	–	5	–	0
Wisconsin–Eau Claire	3	–	5	–	0	3	–	7	–	0
Wisconsin–Superior	0	–	8	–	0	1	–	10	–	0
$ – Conference champion; ^ – NAIA Division I playoff participant Wisconsin–Eau Claire forfeited two non-conference games.; Rankings from NAIA Division I poll

1979 NCAA Division III independents football records
	Conf.			Overall
Team	W	L	T	W		L		T
Wabash		–		8	–	1	–	0
Norwich		–		8	–	2	–	0
Maryville (TN)		–		7	–	2	–	0
Dayton		–		8	–	2	–	1
UCF		–		6	–	2	–	0
Millsaps		–		7	–	3	–	0
Albany		–		6	–	3	–	0
Catholic University		–		6	–	3	–	0
Salisbury State		–		6	–	3	–	0
Georgetown		–		5	–	3	–	0
Hofstra		–		5	–	3	–	1
Frostburg State		–		6	–	4	–	0
Saint Mary's		–		6	–	4	–	0
Brockport		–		5	–	4	–	0
Canisius		–		5	–	4	–	0
Duquesne		–		5	–	4	–	0
Rochester (NY)		–		5	–	4	–	0
Wagner		–		5	–	5	–	0
San Diego		–		5	–	6	–	0
Buffalo		–		4	–	5	–	0
Colorado College		–		4	–	5	–	0
Union (NY)		–		3	–	5	–	0
Grove City		–		3	–	6	–	0
Saint Francis (PA)		–		2	–	6	–	0
DePauw		–		2	–	7	–	0
Merchant Marine		–		1	–	9	–	1
Cortland		–		1	–	9	–	0
St. Norbert		–		1	–	9	–	0
Fordham		–		0	–	9	–	0

== Conference champions ==
Conference champions
- College Athletic Conference – Southwestern at Memphis, Rose–Hulman, and Sewanee
- College Conference of Illinois and Wisconsin – Millikin
- Independent College Athletic Conference – Ithaca
- Iowa Intercollegiate Athletic Conference – Dubuque
- Michigan Intercollegiate Athletic Association – Hope
- Middle Atlantic Conference – Lycoming (North), Widener (South)
- Midwest Collegiate Athletic Conference – Lawrence
- Minnesota Intercollegiate Athletic Conference – Concordia–Moorhead, Saint John's (MN), St. Olaf, and St. Thomas (MN)
- New England Football Conference – New Haven
- New Jersey State Athletic Conference – Montclair State
- Northwest Conference – Pacific Lutheran
- Ohio Athletic Conference – Denison (Red Division), Wittenberg (Blue Division)
- Old Dominion Athletic Conference – Randolph-Macon
- Pennsylvania State Athletic Conference‡ – Lock Haven
- Presidents' Athletic Conference – Carnegie Mellon
- Southern California Intercollegiate Athletic Conference – Claremont–Mudd–Scripps
- Southern Intercollegiate Athletic Conference – Morehouse
- Texas Intercollegiate Athletic Association – Austin
- Twin Rivers Conference – Northwestern–St. Paul
- Wisconsin Intercollegiate Athletic Conference – Wisconsin–River Falls

== Postseason ==
The 1979 NCAA Division III Football Championship playoffs were the seventh annual single-elimination tournament to determine the national champion of men's NCAA Division III college football. The championship game was held at Garrett-Harrison Stadium in Phenix City, Alabama for the seventh consecutive year. Like the previous four championships, eight teams competed in this edition.

=== Playoff bracket ===
Quarterfinals; Campus Sites
Wittenberg	21
Millersville	14
Widener	29
Baldwin Wallace	8
Carnegie Mellon	31
Minnesota–Morris	25
Ithaca	27
Dubuque	7

Semifinals; Campus Sites
Wittenberg	17
Widener	14
Carnegie Mellon	6
Ithaca	15

National Championship Game; Garrett-Harrison Stadium; Phenix City, AL
Wittenberg	10
Ithaca	14

== See also ==
- 1979 NCAA Division I-A football season
- 1979 NCAA Division I-AA football season
- 1979 NCAA Division II football season
- 1979 NAIA Division I football season
- 1979 NAIA Division II football season
