= 1968 Whitewater State Warhawks football team =

American college football season

1968 Whitewater State Warhawks football
- Conference: Wisconsin State University Conference
- Record: 6–3–1 (5–3 WSUC)
- Head coach: Forrest Perkins (13th season)
- Home stadium: Hamilton Field

1968 Wisconsin State University Conference football standings
| | Conf. | | | | | Overall |
| Team | W | | L | | T | W | | L | | T |
|---|---|---|---|---|---|---|---|---|---|---|
| No. 13 Platteville State + | 7 | – | 1 | – | 0 | 8 | – | 1 | – | 0 |
| Oshkosh State + | 7 | – | 1 | – | 0 | 8 | – | 2 | – | 0 |
| Whitewater State | 5 | – | 3 | – | 0 | 6 | – | 3 | – | 1 |
| La Crosse State | 5 | – | 3 | – | 0 | 5 | – | 5 | – | 0 |
| Eau Claire State | 3 | – | 3 | – | 2 | 3 | – | 4 | – | 2 |
| River Falls State | 2 | – | 5 | – | 1 | 3 | – | 6 | – | 1 |
| Stout State | 2 | – | 5 | – | 1 | 3 | – | 6 | – | 1 |
| Stevens Point State | 2 | – | 5 | – | 1 | 2 | – | 7 | – | 1 |
| Superior State | 0 | – | 7 | – | 1 | 0 | – | 9 | – | 1 |
+ – Conference co-champions; Rankings from NAIA poll

The 1968 Whitewater State Warhawks football team represented Wisconsin State University—Whitewater—now known as the University of Wisconsin–Whitewater—as a member of the Wisconsin State University Conference (WSUC) during the 1968 NAIA football season. Led by 13th-year head coach Forrest Perkins, the Warhawks compiled an overall record of 6–3–1 with a conference mark of 5–3, tying for third place in the WSUC. Whitewater State opened the season at home on September 7 with a win over defending NAIA champion Fairmont State.

== Schedule ==
| Date | Time | Opponent | Site | Result | Attendance | Source |
|---|---|---|---|---|---|---|
| September 7 | 1:30 p.m. | Fairmont State* | Hamilton Field; Whitewater, WI | W 16–14 | | |
| September 14 | 1:30 p.m. | Stevens Point State | Hamilton Field; Whitewater, WI | W 29–7 | 5,000 | |
| September 21 | | at Stout State | Nelson Field; Menomonie, WI | W 20–0 | | |
| September 28 | | at Platteville State | Platteville, WI | L 0–6 | | |
| October 5 | | Superior State | Whitewater, WI | W 42–20 | | |
| October 12 | | at St. Norbert* | De Pere, WI | T 21–21 | | |
| October 19 | | at Eau Claire State | Eau Claire, WI | L 14–20 | | |
| October 26 | | River Falls State | Whitewater, WI | W 19–7 | | |
| November 2 | | La Crosse State | Whitewater, WI | W 26–20 | | |
| November 9 | | at Oshkosh State | Oshkosh, WI | L 14–24 | | |
*Non-conference game; All times are in Central time
