= 1973 Wisconsin–Whitewater Warhawks football team =

American college football season

1973 Wisconsin–Whitewater Warhawks football
- Conference: Wisconsin State University Conference
- Record: 6–2–2 (4–2–2 WSUC)
- Head coach: Forrest Perkins (18th season)
- Home stadium: Warhawks Stadium

1973 Wisconsin State University Conference football standings
	Conf.					Overall
Team	W		L		T	W		L		T
No. 6 Wisconsin–La Crosse $^	7	–	1	–	0	9	–	2	–	0
No. 14 Wisconsin–Platteville	6	–	1	–	1	8	–	1	–	1
Wisconsin–Whitewater	4	–	2	–	2	6	–	2	–	2
Wisconsin–Eau Claire	4	–	4	–	0	5	–	5	–	0
Wisconsin–Oshkosh	4	–	4	–	0	4	–	6	–	0
Wisconsin–River Falls	3	–	4	–	1	4	–	5	–	1
Wisconsin–Stevens Point	3	–	5	–	0	4	–	6	–	0
Wisconsin–Superior	2	–	6	–	0	2	–	8	–	0
Wisconsin–Stout	1	–	7	–	0	1	–	9	–	0
$ – Conference champion; ^ – NAIA Division I playoff participant; Rankings from NAIA Division I poll

The 1973 Wisconsin–Whitewater Warhawks football team was an American football team that represented the University of Wisconsin–Whitewater as a member of the Wisconsin State University Conference (WSUC) during the 1973 NCAA Division III football season. Led by 18th-year head coach Forrest Perkins, the Warhawks compiled an overall record of 6–2–2 and a mark of 4–2–2 in conference play, placing third in the WSUC.

== Schedule ==
Date	Opponent	Site	Result	Attendance	Source
September 8	at Northern Michigan*	Memorial Field; Marquette, MI	L 7–0	5,000	
September 15	Wisconsin–Platteville	Warhawks Stadium; Whitewater, WI	T 14–14	6,000	
September 22	at Wisconsin–Superior	Superior, WI	W 42–14	2,500	
September 29	at Wisconsin–Stevens Point	Stevens Point, WI	W 37–30	4,000	
October 6	Wisconsin–Stout	Warhawks Stadium; Whitewater, WI	W 35–16	3,500	
October 13	St. Norbert*	Warhawks Stadium; Whitewater, WI	W 3–0	7,500	
October 20	at Wisconsin–River Falls	River Falls, WI	T 14–14	3,000	
October 27	Wisconsin–Eau Claire	Warhawks Stadium; Whitewater, WI	W 13–7	4,000	
November 3	at Wisconsin–La Crosse	La Crosse, WI	L 15–16	7,000	
November 10	Wisconsin–Oshkosh	Warhawks Stadium; Whitewater, WI	L 6–24	4,000	
*Non-conference game

== Roster ==
1973 Wisconsin–Whitewater Warhawks football team roster
Players			Coaches
Offense: Pos. / # / Name / Class; QB / 9 / Rich Murphy / So	Defense: Pos. / # / Name / Class	Special teams: Pos. / # / Name / Class	Head coach: Forrest Perkins; Coordinators/assistant coaches Legend: (C) Team captain; (S) Suspended; (I) Ineligible; Injured; Redshirt
