= Mike Farley (coach) =

American baseball player and football coach (1934–2018)

Biographical details
- Born: January 14, 1934; St. Louis, Missouri, U.S.
- Died: August 28, 2018 (aged 84); Arizona, U.S.

Playing career

Baseball
- 1954: Pine Bluff Judges
- 1954: Marion Marauders
- 1955–1957: Illinois

Coaching career (HC unless noted)

Football
- 1958–1960: Pardeeville HS (WI)
- 1961–1962: Portage HS (WI)
- 1963–1966: Sparta HS (WI)
- 1967–1969: Racine Park HS (WI)
- 1970–1988: River Falls State / Wisconsin–River Falls

Baseball
- 1958: Illinois (assistant)

Head coaching record
- Overall: 117–70–3 (college); 51–26–7 (high school)
- Tournaments: 0–1 (NAIA D-I playoffs)

Accomplishments and honors

Championships
- 8 WSUC (1975–1976, 1979–1980, 1984–1987)

George Michael Farley (January 14, 1934 – August 28, 2018) was an American football coach and baseball player. After coaching at various high schools throughout Wisconsin, he served as the head football coach at the University of Wisconsin–River Falls from 1970 to 1988. Before he entered coaching, Farley was a standout baseball player, first in high school at Alton, Illinois, then for two seasons in the Baltimore Orioles organization, and then in college at the University of Illinois.

== Head coaching record ==
=== College ===
| Year | Team | Overall | Conference | Standing | Bowl/playoffs |
|---|---|---|---|---|---|
River Falls State / Wisconsin–River Falls Falcons (Wisconsin State University Conference) (1970–1988)
| 1970 | River Falls State | 1–8 | 0–8 | 9th | |
| 1971 | Wisconsin–River Falls | 3–7 | 2–6 | T–7th | |
| 1972 | Wisconsin–River Falls | 4–6 | 4–4 | T–4th | |
| 1973 | Wisconsin–River Falls | 4–5–1 | 3–4–1 | 6th | |
| 1974 | Wisconsin–River Falls | 7–3 | 5–3 | 4th | |
| 1975 | Wisconsin–River Falls | 8–2 | 7–1 | T–1st | |
| 1976 | Wisconsin–River Falls | 7–3 | 6–2 | T–1st | |
| 1977 | Wisconsin–River Falls | 4–6 | 3–5 | T–5th | |
| 1976 | Wisconsin–River Falls | 4–6 | 3–5 | T–5th | |
| 1979 | Wisconsin–River Falls | 9–2 | 7–1 | 1st | L NAIA Division I Quarterfinal |
| 1980 | Wisconsin–River Falls | 8–2 | 6–2 | T–1st | |
| 1981 | Wisconsin–River Falls | 5–5 | 3–5 | T–7th | |
| 1982 | Wisconsin–River Falls | 7–2–1 | 6–2 | T–2nd | |
| 1983 | Wisconsin–River Falls | 8–2 | 6–2 | T–3rd | |
| 1984 | Wisconsin–River Falls | 8–2 | 7–1 | T–1st | |
| 1985 | Wisconsin–River Falls | 8–1–1 | 6–1–1 | 1st | |
| 1986 | Wisconsin–River Falls | 8–2 | 7–1 | T–1st | |
| 1987 | Wisconsin–River Falls | 7–3 (Note: Wisconsin–River Falls finished the 1987 with an overall record of 6–4 and a conference mark of 5–3, tying for second place in the Wisconsin State University Conference (WSUC). In May 1988, Wisconsin–Stevens Point, who won the conference title and defeated Wisconsin–River Falls, forfeited all their wins from the 1987 season because of the use of two ineligible players. This elevated Wisconsin–River Falls's record to 7–3 overall and 6–2 in conference play and placed them into a share of the conference title with Wisconsin–Whitewater.) | 6–2 | T–1st | |
| 1988 | Wisconsin–River Falls | 7–3 | 6–2 | T–2nd | |
| River Falls State / Wisconsin–River Falls: | | 117–70–3 | 93–57–2 | | |
| Total: | | 117–70–3 | | | |
National championship Conference title Conference division title or championship game berth
