= 1967 Whitewater State Warhawks football team =

American college football season

1967 Whitewater State Warhawks football

WSUC champion
- Conference: Wisconsin State University Conference
- Record: 8–1 (7–1 WSUC)
- Head coach: Forrest Perkins (12th season)

1967 Wisconsin State University Conference football standings
	Conf.					Overall
Team	W		L		T	W		L		T
No. 18 Whitewater State $	7	–	1	–	0	8	–	1	–	0
Stevens Point State	6	–	1	–	1	6	–	2	–	1
Oshkosh State	6	–	2	–	0	6	–	3	–	0
La Crosse State	4	–	3	–	1	4	–	4	–	1
Platteville State	4	–	4	–	0	5	–	4	–	0
Superior State	3	–	5	–	0	3	–	6	–	0
Eau Claire State	2	–	6	–	0	3	–	6	–	0
River Falls State	2	–	6	–	0	2	–	7	–	0
Stout State	1	–	6	–	0	1	–	7	–	0
$ – Conference champion; Rankings from NAIA poll

The 1967 Whitewater State Warhawks football team was an American football team that represented Wisconsin State University—Whitewater—now known as the University of Wisconsin–Whitewater—as a member of the Wisconsin State University Conference (WSUC) during the 1967 NAIA football season. In their 12th season under head coach Forrest Perkins, the Warhawks began the year as the favorite to win the WSUC championship. They compiled an 8–1 record and won the WSUC championship. The team set WSUC records for fewest points allowed (72 points in eight conference games), fewest rushing yards (379), and fewest total yards (1,184).

Six Whitewater players received first-team honors on the WSUC all conference team: halfback Greg Jones; offensive guard Jim Perkins; defensive end Jerry Mahoney; defensive tackle Larry Dickerson; linebacker Al Equi; and defensive halfback Neil Hansen. End Barry Wojtak and cornerback Jim Olmstead were selected as the team's most valuable seniors.

== Schedule ==
Date	Opponent	Site	Result	Attendance	Source
September 16	at Stevens Point State	Stevens Point, WI	L 13–19		
September 23	Stout State	Hamilton Field; Whitewater, WI	W 18–7		
September 30	Platteville State	Hamilton Field; Whitewater, WI	W 27–19		
October 7	at Superior State	Superior, WI	W 24–0		
October 14	St. Norbert*	Hamilton Field; Whitewater, WI	W 13–6		
October 21	Eau Claire State	Hamilton Field; Whitewater, WI	W 43–0		
October 28	at River Falls State	River Falls, WI	W 26–13		
November 4	at La Crosse State	La Crosse, WI	W 6–0		
November 11	at Oshkosh State	Hamilton Field; Whitewater, WI	W 23–14	7,651	
*Non-conference game
