= Forrest Perkins =

American football and baseball player, coach, and college athletics administrator

Biographical details
- Born: November 13, 1920; Dodgeville, Wisconsin, U.S.
- Died: December 13, 2014 (aged 94); Whitewater, Wisconsin, U.S.

Coaching career (HC unless noted)

Football
- 1956–1984: Whitewater State / Wisconsin–Whitewater

Baseball
- 1960–1965: Whitewater State

Administrative career (AD unless noted)
- 1971–1984: Wisconsin–Whitewater

Head coaching record
- Overall: 185–93–8 (football); 68–27 (baseball)
- Tournaments: Football; 1–1 (NAIA playoffs)

Accomplishments and honors

Championships
- Football; 11 WSCC/WSUC/WAIC (1959–1960, 1962, 1966–1967, 1969, 1974–1975, 1978, 1980, 1984)

Awards
- Football; NAIA Coach of the Year (1966)

Forrest W. Perkins (November 13, 1920 – December 13, 2014) was an American football, baseball, and track and field coach and college athletics administrator. He served as the head football coach at the University of Wisconsin–Whitewater from 1956 to 1984, compiling a record of 185–93–8. He was the school's athletic director from 1971 until his retirement in 1984. He also coached baseball and track and field at Wisconsin–Whitewater.

Perkins was born on November 13, 1920, and attended Dodgeville High School in Dodgeville, Wisconsin. He earned a bachelor's degree in education from University of Wisconsin–Platteville, where he played football, basketball, and baseball. Perkins served in World War II with the United States Marine Corps while enrolled at Wisconsin–Platteville. He obtained a master's degree from the University of Wisconsin–Madison in 1950 and coached football and baseball at the high school level in the state of Wisconsin before arriving at Wisconsin–Whitewater.

== Head coaching record ==
=== Football ===
Year	Team	Overall	Conference	Standing	Bowl/playoffs
Whitewater State Quakers / Whitewater State Warhawks / Wisconsin–Whitewater Warhawks (Wisconsin State College Conference / Wisconsin State University Conference / Wisconsin Intercollegiate Athletic Conference) (1956–1984)
1956	Whitewater State	4–4	2–3	T–5th	
1957	Whitewater State	5–2–1	3–1–1	3rd	
1958	Whitewater State	5–3	4–2	T–3rd	
1959	Whitewater State	7–1–1	6–0	1st	
1960	Whitewater State	7–0–1	6–0	1st	
1961	Whitewater State	6–3	3–3	4th	
1962	Whitewater State	6–3	6–1	1st	
1963	Whitewater State	6–3	5–2	3rd	
1964	Whitewater State	3–5–1	3–2–1	4th	
1965	Whitewater State	7–2–1	4–1–1	T–2nd	
1966	Whitewater State	10–1	8–0	1st	L NAIA Championship
1967	Whitewater State	8–1	7–1	1st	
1968	Whitewater State	6–3–1	5–3	T–3rd	
1969	Whitewater State	8–1	7–1	T–1st	
1970	Whitewater State	6–4	5–3	T–2nd	
1971	Wisconsin–Whitewater	3–7	2–6	T–7th	
1972	Wisconsin–Whitewater	7–3	6–2	3rd	
1973	Wisconsin–Whitewater	6–2–2	4–2–2	3rd	
1974	Wisconsin–Whitewater	8–3	7–1	T–1st	
1975	Wisconsin–Whitewater	8–3	7–1	T–1st	
1976	Wisconsin–Whitewater	2–9	2–6	T–7th	
1977	Wisconsin–Whitewater	7–4	6–2	2nd	
1978	Wisconsin–Whitewater	7–4	7–1	T–1st	
1979	Wisconsin–Whitewater	7–4	6–2	T–2nd	
1980	Wisconsin–Whitewater	8–3	6–2	T–1st	
1981	Wisconsin–Whitewater	7–3	5–3	T–2nd	
1982	Wisconsin–Whitewater	7–4	4–4	5th	
1983	Wisconsin–Whitewater	6–5	6–2	T–3rd	
1984	Wisconsin–Whitewater	8–3	7–1	T–1st	
Whitewater State / Wisconsin–Whitewater:		185–93–8	149–58–5		
Total:		185–93–8			
National championship Conference title Conference division title or championship game berth
