= Roger Harring =

American football player and coach (1932–2021)

Biographical details
- Born: October 4, 1932; Green Bay, Wisconsin, U.S.
- Died: August 12, 2021 (aged 88); La Crosse, Wisconsin, U.S.

Playing career
- 1955–1956: Wisconsin–La Crosse

Coaching career (HC unless noted)
- 1958–1962: Ladysmith HS (WI)
- 1963–1968: Lincoln HS (WI)
- 1969–1999: Wisconsin–La Crosse

Head coaching record
- Overall: 261–75–7 (college)
- Tournaments: 0–2 (NAIA D-I playoffs); 10–4 (NAIA D-II playoffs); 13–5 (NCAA D-III playoffs)

Accomplishments and honors

Championships
- 1 NAIA Division II (1985); 2 NCAA Division III (1992, 1995); 15 WIAC (1971, 1973–1975, 1978, 1980, 1982, 1986, 1989, 1991–1993, 1995–1996, 1999)

Awards
- AFCA Division III Coach of the Year (1995); 7× WIAC Coach of the Year (1982, 1989, 1991–1993, 1996, 1999)
- College Football Hall of Fame; Inducted in 2005 (profile)

Roger Harring (October 4, 1932 – August 12, 2021) was an American football player and coach. He won 340 games over 42 seasons at both the high school and college levels.

Harring graduated from Wisconsin State College–La Crosse (later renamed University of Wisconsin–La Crosse). He graduated in 1958 with a Bachelor of Science degree in physical education.

After graduating from La Crosse, Harring coached high school football at Ladysmith High School in Ladysmith, Wisconsin (1958–1962) and at Lincoln High School in Wisconsin Rapids, Wisconsin (1963–1968). He won 79 games as a high school coach.

In 1969, Harring accepted the head coaching job at his alma mater. At Wisconsin–La Crosse, he had a 261–75–7 record. He won 15 conference titles and three national championships (1985, 1992, 1995) before his retirement in 1999.

Harring was inducted into the College Football Hall of Fame in 2005. The University of Wisconsin–La Crosse later named its football stadium “Harring Stadium” in honor of Harring's legacy. Harring Stadium is part of the facility that is officially called Veterans Memorial Sports Field Complex.

Harring died at the age of 88 on August 12, 2021.

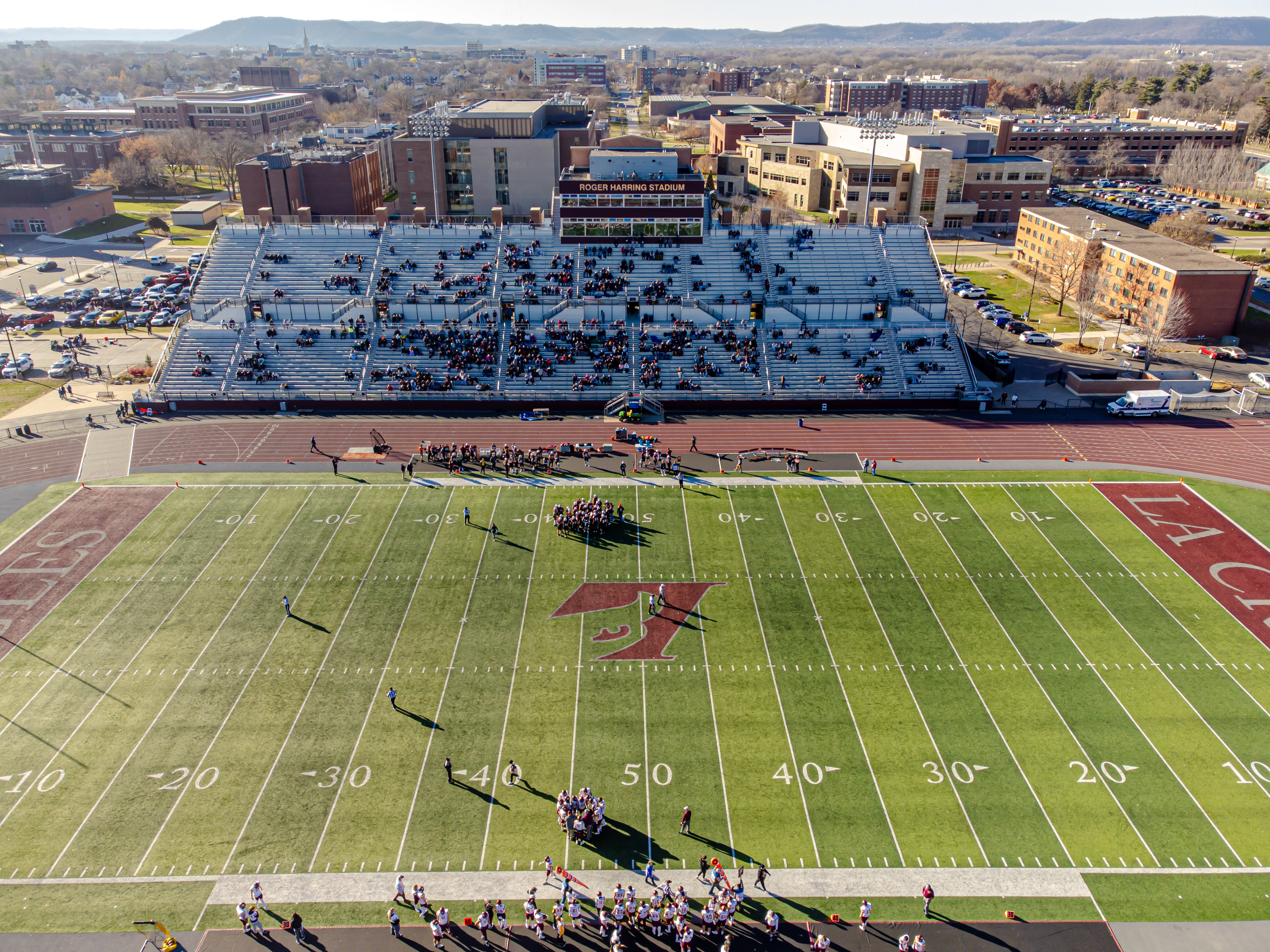
UW-L football game at Roger Harring Veterans Memorial Stadium

== Head coaching record ==
=== College ===
Year	Team	Overall	Conference	Standing	Bowl/playoffs
La Crosse State / Wisconsin–La Crosse Indians/Eagles (Wisconsin State University Athletic Conference / Wisconsin Intercollegiate Athletic Conference) (1969–present)
1969	La Crosse State	5–5	4–4	5th	
1970	La Crosse State	5–4–1	4–3–1	6th	
1971	Wisconsin–La Crosse	8–2	7–1	T–1st	
1972	Wisconsin–La Crosse	8–2	7–1	2nd	
1973	Wisconsin–La Crosse	9–2	7–1	1st	L NAIA Division I Semifinal
1974	Wisconsin–La Crosse	8–2	7–1	T–1st	
1975	Wisconsin–La Crosse	8–3	7–1	T–1st	
1976	Wisconsin–La Crosse	7–3	5–3	T–4th	
1977	Wisconsin–La Crosse	6–2–2	5–2–1	3rd	
1978	Wisconsin–La Crosse	9–2	7–1	T–1st	L NAIA Division I Quarterfinal
1979	Wisconsin–La Crosse	7–2	6–2	T–2nd	
1980	Wisconsin–La Crosse	8–2	6–2	T–1st	
1981	Wisconsin–La Crosse	6–4	4–4	T–4th	
1982	Wisconsin–La Crosse	8–2	7–1	1st	
1983	Wisconsin–La Crosse	9–3–1	6–1–1	2nd	L NCAA Division III Semifinal
1984	Wisconsin–La Crosse	8–2	6–2	3rd	
1985	Wisconsin–La Crosse	11–1–2	5–1–2	2nd	W NAIA Division II Championship
1986	Wisconsin–La Crosse	10–2	7–1	T–1st	L NAIA Division II Semifinal
1987	Wisconsin–La Crosse	5–5	5–3	T–3rd	
1988	Wisconsin–La Crosse	11–3	6–2	T–2nd	L NAIA Division II Championship
1989	Wisconsin–La Crosse	12–2	7–1	1st	L NAIA Division II Championship
1990	Wisconsin–La Crosse	9–2	7–1	2nd	L NAIA Division II First Round
1991	Wisconsin–La Crosse	10–2	7–1	1st	L NCAA Division III Quarterfinal
1992	Wisconsin–La Crosse	12–0–1	6–0–1	1st	W NCAA Division III Championship
1993	Wisconsin–La Crosse	11–1	7–0	1st	L NCAA Division III Quarterfinal
1994	Wisconsin–La Crosse	8–2	5–2	T–2nd	
1995	Wisconsin–La Crosse	14–0	7–0	1st	W NCAA Division III Championship
1996	Wisconsin–La Crosse	11–2	7–0	1st	L NCAA Division III Semifinal
1997	Wisconsin–La Crosse	7–2	5–2	T–2nd	
1998	Wisconsin–La Crosse	4–5	4–3	5th	
1999	Wisconsin–La Crosse	7–4	6–1	T–1st	L NCAA Division III First Round
La Crosse State / Wisconsin–La Crosse:		261–75–7	186–48–6		
Total:		261–75–7			
National championship Conference title Conference division title or championship game berth

== See also ==
- List of college football career coaching wins leaders
