= 1979 Wisconsin–La Crosse Indians football team =

American college football season

1979 Wisconsin–La Crosse Indians football
- Conference: Wisconsin State University Conference
- Record: 7–4 (6–2 WSUC)
- Head coach: Roger Harring (11th season)
- Home stadium: Veterans Memorial Stadium

1979 Wisconsin State University Conference football standings
	Conf.					Overall
Team	W		L		T	W		L		T
No. 4 Wisconsin–River Falls $^	7	–	1	–	0	9	–	2	–	0
No. 20 Wisconsin–La Crosse	6	–	2	–	0	7	–	2	–	0
Wisconsin–Whitewater	6	–	2	–	0	7	–	4	–	0
Wisconsin–Stout	4	–	4	–	0	6	–	4	–	0
Wisconsin–Stevens Point	4	–	4	–	0	5	–	5	–	0
Wisconsin–Oshkosh	3	–	5	–	0	5	–	5	–	0
Wisconsin–Platteville	3	–	5	–	0	5	–	5	–	0
Wisconsin–Eau Claire	3	–	5	–	0	3	–	7	–	0
Wisconsin–Superior	0	–	8	–	0	1	–	10	–	0
$ – Conference champion; ^ – NAIA Division I playoff participant Wisconsin–Eau Claire forfeited two non-conference games.; Rankings from NAIA Division I poll

The 1979 Wisconsin–La Crosse Indians football team was an American football team that represented the University of Wisconsin–La Crosse as a member of the Wisconsin State University Conference (WSUC) during the 1979 NAIA Division I football season. Led by 11th-year head coach Roger Harring, the Indians compiled an overall record of 7–2 and a mark of 6–2 in conference play, tying for second place in the WSUC. Wisconsin–La Crosse was ranked No. 20 in the final NAIA Division I poll.

== Schedule ==
Date	Opponent	Site	Result
September 15	Wisconsin–Stevens Point	Veterans Memorial Stadium; La Crosse, WI	W 62–7
September 22	at Wisconsin–Platteville	Ralph E. Davis Pioneer Stadium; Platteville, WI	W 21–6
September 29	at Wisconsin–Superior	Superior, WI	W 49–3
October 6	Winona State*	Veterans Memorial Stadium; La Crosse, WI	W 48–0
October 13	Wisconsin–River Falls	Veterans Memorial Stadium; La Crosse, WI	L 7–35
October 20	at Wisconsin–Eau Claire	Eau Claire, WI	L 24–30 ^{OT}
October 27	Wisconsin–Oshkosh	Veterans Memorial Stadium; La Crosse, WI	W 17–10
November 3	Wisconsin–Whitewater	Veterans Memorial Stadium; La Crosse, WI	W 47–28
November 10	at Wisconsin–Stout	Menomonie, WI	W 41–21
*Non-conference game

== Roster ==
1979 Wisconsin–La Crosse Eagles football team roster
Players
Coaches
Offense

Pos.	#	Name	Class
QB	20	Tim Murphy	Jr
QB	21	Mike Durnin	Jr
QB	22	Tim Kildahl	So

Defense

Pos.	#	Name	Class
DB	27	Scott Zywicki	Sr

Special teams

Pos.	#	Name	Class

Head coach

- Roger Harring

Coordinators/assistant coaches

Legend

- (C) Team captain
- (S) Suspended
- (I) Ineligible
- Injured
- Redshirt
