= 1974 Wisconsin–Whitewater Warhawks football team =

American college football season

1974 Wisconsin–Whitewater Warhawks football

WSUC co-champion
- Conference: Wisconsin State University Conference
- Record: 8–3 (7–1 WSUC)
- Head coach: Forrest Perkins (18th season)
- Home stadium: Warhawks Stadium

1974 Wisconsin State University Conference football standings
	Conf.					Overall
Team	W		L		T	W		L		T
No. 17 Wisconsin–Platteville +	7	–	1	–	0	8	–	2	–	0
No. 18 Wisconsin–Whitewater +	7	–	1	–	0	8	–	3	–	0
No. 16 Wisconsin–La Crosse +	7	–	1	–	0	7	–	3	–	0
Wisconsin–River Falls	5	–	3	–	0	7	–	3	–	0
Wisconsin–Eau Claire	4	–	4	–	0	6	–	4	–	0
Wisconsin–Oshkosh	2	–	6	–	0	3	–	7	–	0
Wisconsin–Stevens Point	2	–	6	–	0	3	–	7	–	0
Wisconsin–Stout	1	–	7	–	0	2	–	8	–	0
Wisconsin–Superior	1	–	7	–	0	1	–	9	–	0
+ – Conference co-champions; Wisconsin–La Crosse forfeited one non-conference game.; Rankings from NAIA Division I poll

The 1974 Wisconsin–Whitewater Warhawks football team was an American football team that represented the University of Wisconsin–Whitewater as a member of the Wisconsin State University Conference (WSUC) during the 1974 NCAA Division III football season. Led by 18th-year head coach Forrest Perkins, the Warhawks compiled an overall record of 8–3 and a mark of 7–1 in conference play, sharing the WSUC title with Wisconsin–La Crosse and Wisconsin–Platteville.

== Schedule ==
Date	Opponent	Site	Result	Attendance	Source
September 7	Northern Michigan*	Warhawks Stadium; Whitewater, WI	W 14–0	4,000	
September 14	at Wisconsin–Platteville	Platteville, WI	W 19–17	8,600	
September 21	Wisconsin–Superior	Warhawks Stadium; Whitewater, WI	W 48–7	4,500	
September 28	Wisconsin–Stevens Point	Warhawks Stadium; Whitewater, WI	W 20–18	6,500	
October 5	at Wisconsin–Stout	Menomonie, WI	W 67–0	1,000	
October 12	at St. Norbert*	De Pere, WI	L 12–13	3,500	
October 19	Wisconsin–River Falls	Warhawks Stadium; Whitewater, WI	W 28–14	6,000	
October 26	at Wisconsin–Eau Claire	Carson Park; Eau Claire, WI	W 9–6	4,000	
November 2	Wisconsin–La Crosse	Warhawks Stadium; Whitewater, WI	L 3–19	5,000	
November 9	at Wisconsin–Oshkosh	Titan Stadium; Oshkosh, WI	W 32–19	3,000	
November 16	at Milwaukee*	Marquette Stadium; Milwaukee, WI	L 14–26	6,000	
*Non-conference game
