= 1985 Wisconsin–La Crosse Indians football team =

American college football season

1985 Wisconsin–La Crosse Indians football

NAIA Division II national champion

NAIA Division II championship game, W 24–7 vs. Pacific Lutheran
- Conference: Wisconsin State University Conference
- Record: 11–1–2 (5–1–2 WSUC)
- Head coach: Roger Harring (17th season)
- Home stadium: Memorial Field

1985 Wisconsin State University Conference football standings
	Conf.					Overall
Team	W		L		T	W		L		T
Wisconsin–River Falls $	6	–	1	–	1	8	–	1	–	1
No. 8 Wisconsin–La Crosse ^	5	–	1	–	2	11	–	1	–	2
Wisconsin–Stevens Point	5	–	2	–	1	8	–	2	–	1
Wisconsin–Platteville	5	–	3	–	0	5	–	5	–	0
Wisconsin–Eau Claire	3	–	4	–	1	5	–	4	–	1
Wisconsin–Whitewater	3	–	4	–	1	3	–	7	–	1
Wisconsin–Oshkosh	2	–	5	–	1	4	–	5	–	1
Wisconsin–Stout	2	–	6	–	0	3	–	7	–	0
Wisconsin–Superior	1	–	6	–	1	2	–	8	–	1
$ – Conference champion; * – NAIA Division II playoff participant; Rankings from NAIA Division II poll

The 1985 Wisconsin–La Crosse Indians football team was an American football team that represented University of Wisconsin–La Crosse as a member of the Wisconsin State University Conference (WSUC) and won the Division III national championship during the 1985 NAIA Division II football season. In their 17th season under head coach Roger Harring, the Eagles compiled an 11–1–2 record (5–1–2 in conference games) and won the WSUC championship. They advanced to the NAIA Division II playoffs, defeating Carroll (MT) in the quarterfinals, Northwestern (IA) in the semifinals, and Pacific Lutheran in the NAIA Division II championship game.

During the 11-game regular season, the Indians tallied 2,115 rushing yards (192.3 per game) and 1,618 passing yards (147.1 per game). On defense, they gave up 1,191 rushing yards (108.3 per game) and 1,505 passing yards (136.8 per game). The individual statistical leaders included senior fullback Dan Lowney (1,077 rushing yards, 102 points scored, 36.0-yard average on 59 punts), sophomore split end Jose Alba (27 catches for 428 yards), and junior kicker Joe Mirasola (32 of 34 extra points, eight of 15 field goals).

Six La-Crosse players received first-team honors on the 1985 All-WSUC football team: offensive guard Tom Newberry (unanimous); Dan Lowney (selected as both a running back and punter); defensive end Jay Wolowicz; linebacker Dale Gottschalk; inside linebacker Phil Ertl; and defensive back Pat Bushman.

The team played its home games at Memorial Field in La Crosse, Wisconsin.

== Schedule ==
Date	Opponent	Site	Result	Attendance	Source
August 31	at Winona State*	Winona, MN	W 44–7	2,500	
September 7	Gustavus Adolphus*	Memorial Field; La Crosse, WI	W 27–7	3,000	
September 14	at St. Ambrose*	Davenport, IA	W 31–7	3,000	
September 21	Wisconsin–Stevens Point	Memorial Field; La Crosse, WI	T 35–35	2,500	
September 28	at Wisconsin–Platteville	Platteville, WI	W 27–7	2,500	
October 5	at Wisconsin–Superior	Superior, WI	W 42–14	1,000	
October 19	Wisconsin–River Falls	Memorial Field; La Crosse, WI	L 21–34	4,500	
October 26	at Wisconsin–Eau Claire	Eau Claire, WI	W 13–10	3,000	
November 2	Wisconsin–Oshkosh	Memorial Field; La Crosse, WI	T 14–14	3,000	
November 9	Wisconsin–Whitewater	Memorial Field; La Crosse, WI	W 28–2	2,000	
November 16	at Wisconsin–Stout	Menomonie, WI	W 10–3	1,000	
November 30	at Carroll (MT)*	Helena, MT (NAIA Division II quarterfinal)	W 24–0		
December 7	vs. Northwestern (IA)*	DakotaDome; Vermillion, SD (NAIA Division II semifinal)	W 35–28 ^{3OT}		
December 14	at Pacific Lutheran*	Parkland, WA (NAIA Division II championship game)	W 24–7		
*Non-conference game
