= 1978 Wisconsin–Whitewater Warhawks football team =

American college football season

1978 Wisconsin–Whitewater Warhawks football

WSUC co-champion
- Conference: Wisconsin State University Conference
- Record: 7–4 (7–1 WSUC)
- Head coach: Forrest Perkins (22nd season)
- Home stadium: Warhawks Stadium

1978 Wisconsin State University Conference football standings
	Conf.					Overall
Team	W		L		T	W		L		T
No. 7 Wisconsin–La Crosse +^	7	–	1	–	0	9	–	2	–	0
Wisconsin–Whitewater +	7	–	1	–	0	7	–	4	–	0
No. 12 Wisconsin–Eau Claire	6	–	2	–	0	8	–	2	–	0
Wisconsin–Stout	5	–	3	–	0	7	–	3	–	0
Wisconsin–Oshkosh	3	–	5	–	0	4	–	6	–	0
Wisconsin–River Falls	3	–	5	–	0	4	–	6	–	0
Wisconsin–Stevens Point	2	–	6	–	0	4	–	6	–	0
Wisconsin–Platteville	2	–	5	–	0	3	–	7	–	0
Wisconsin–Superior	1	–	7	–	0	2	–	9	–	0
+ – Conference co-champions; ^ – NAIA Division I playoff participant; Rankings from NAIA Division I poll

The 1978 Wisconsin–Whitewater Warhawks football team was an American football team that represented the University of Wisconsin–Whitewater as a member of the Wisconsin State University Conference (WSUC) during the 1978 NAIA Division I football season. Led by coach Forrest Perkins in his 22nd year, the Warhawks compiled an overall record of 7–4 and a mark of 7–1 in conference play, sharing the WSUC title with Wisconsin–La Crosse.

== Schedule ==
Date	Opponent	Site	Result	Attendance	Source
September 2	at Northern Iowa*	UNI-Dome; Cedar Falls, IA	L 12–15	8,500	
September 9	Mankato State*	Warhawks Stadium; Whitewater, WI	L 0–10		
September 16	Wisconsin–La Crosse	Warhawks Stadium; Whitewater, WI	W 20–9		
September 23	at Wisconsin–Stout	Menomonie, WI	W 31–10		
September 30	at Wisconsin–Platteville	Platteville, WI	W 19–0		
October 7	Wisconsin–Superior	Warhawks Stadium; Whitewater, WI	W 54–8		
October 14	at Northern Michigan*	Marquette, Michigan	L 14–41		
October 21	Wisconsin–Stevens Point	Stevens Point, WI	L 12–14		
October 28	at Wisconsin–Eau Claire	Eau Claire, WI	W 38–22		
November 4	Wisconsin–River Falls	Warhawks Stadium; Whitewater, WI	W 21–17		
November 11	Wisconsin–Oshkosh	Warhawks Stadium; Whitewater, WI	W 31–0		
*Non-conference game
