= 1979 Wisconsin–River Falls Falcons football team =

1979 Wisconsin–River Falls Falcons football

WSUC champion

NAIA Division I Quarterfinal, L 7–31 at Angelo State
- Conference: Wisconsin State University Conference
- Record: 9–2 (7–1 WSUC)
- Head coach: Mike Farley (10th season)
- Home stadium: Ramer Field

1979 Wisconsin State University Conference football standings
| | Conf. | | | | | Overall |
| Team | W | | L | | T | W | | L | | T |
|---|---|---|---|---|---|---|---|---|---|---|
| No. 4 Wisconsin–River Falls $^ | 7 | – | 1 | – | 0 | 9 | – | 2 | – | 0 |
| No. 20 Wisconsin–La Crosse | 6 | – | 2 | – | 0 | 7 | – | 2 | – | 0 |
| Wisconsin–Whitewater | 6 | – | 2 | – | 0 | 7 | – | 4 | – | 0 |
| Wisconsin–Stout | 4 | – | 4 | – | 0 | 6 | – | 4 | – | 0 |
| Wisconsin–Stevens Point | 4 | – | 4 | – | 0 | 5 | – | 5 | – | 0 |
| Wisconsin–Oshkosh | 3 | – | 5 | – | 0 | 5 | – | 5 | – | 0 |
| Wisconsin–Platteville | 3 | – | 5 | – | 0 | 5 | – | 5 | – | 0 |
| Wisconsin–Eau Claire | 3 | – | 5 | – | 0 | 3 | – | 7 | – | 0 |
| Wisconsin–Superior | 0 | – | 8 | – | 0 | 1 | – | 10 | – | 0 |
$ – Conference champion; ^ – NAIA Division I playoff participant Wisconsin–Eau Claire forfeited two non-conference games.; Rankings from NAIA Division I poll

The 1979 Wisconsin–River Falls Falcons football team was an American college football team that represented the University of Wisconsin–River Falls as a member of the Wisconsin State University Conference (WSUC) during the 1979 NAIA Division I football season. In their tenth year under head coach Mike Farley, the Falcons compiled a 9–2 record (7–1 in conference games) and won the WSUC championship. The team was ranked No. 4 in the final NAIA rankings and played in its first ever postseason game, losing to Angelo State in the quarterfinals of the NAIA Division I playoffs. The Falcons' nine wins was the most to that point in program history, topping the eight wins recorded by River Falls in 1925 and 1975. It was also the school's first undisputed conference championship since 1958.

The Falcons' offense operated out of the wishbone formation and emphasized the run game, tallying 3,074 rushing yards with an average of 279.4 yards per game and 4.5 yards per carry. In the passing game, they tallied 736 passing yards. On defense, they gave up an average of less than 10 points per conference game.

Farley was named NAIA District 14 coach of the year, and five River Falls players were named to the all-district football team: halfback Tom Stapleton; center Rich Luedke; guard Gerard Sonsalla; offensive tackle Gene Meyer; and defensive back Steve Lyons. Those same five players plus defensive end Dean Sturz were also named to the 1979 all-WSUC team. The team's statistical leaders included fullback Charlie Reed (862 rushing yards), quarterback Jim Abbs (245 passing yards), John Hoch (8 receptions for 188 yards), Dale Mueller (84 points scored), Tom Stapleton (171 punt return yards, 140 kickoff return yards), and Mike McMartin (127 total tackles).

The team played its home games at Ramer Field in River Falls, Wisconsin.

== Schedule ==
| Date | Opponent | Site | Result | Source |
|---|---|---|---|---|
| September 8 | Augsburg (MN)* | Ramer Field; River Falls, WI | W 62–7 | |
| September 15 | Wisconsin–Oshkosh | Ramer Field; River Falls, WI | W 10–7 | |
| September 22 | at Wisconsin–Eau Claire | Eau Claire, WI | W 28–13 | |
| September 29 | Mankato State* | Ramer Field; River Falls, WI | W 32–25 | |
| October 6 | Wisconsin–Platteville | Ramer Field; River Falls, WI | W 28–23 | |
| October 13 | at Wisconsin–La Crosse | Veterans Memorial Stadium; La Crosse, WI | W 35–7 | |
| October 20 | Wisconsin–Whitewater | Ramer Field; River Falls, WI | W 26–13 | |
| October 27 | at Wisconsin–Superior | Ole Haugsrud Memorial Field; Superior, WI | W 42–0 | |
| November 3 | Wisconsin–Stout | Ramer Field; River Falls, WI | L 3–7 | |
| November 10 | at Wisconsin–Stevens Point | Goerke Field; Stevens Point, WI | W 47–7 | |
| December 1 | at Angelo State | San Angelo Stadium; San Angelo, TX (NAIA Division I Quarterfinal) | L 7–31 | |
*Non-conference game
