= Jim Wacker =

American football player, coach, and administrator (1937–2003)

- Wacker, c. 1977

Biographical details
- Born: April 29, 1937; Detroit, Michigan, U.S.
- Died: August 26, 2003 (aged 66); San Marcos, Texas, U.S.

Playing career
- 1957–1959: Valparaiso
- Position: Tackle

Coaching career (HC unless noted)
- 1960–1963: Concordia HS (OR) (assistant)
- 1964–1969: Concordia (NE) (assistant)
- 1970: Augustana (SD) (assistant)
- 1971–1975: Texas Lutheran
- 1976–1978: North Dakota State
- 1979–1982: Southwest Texas State
- 1983–1991: TCU
- 1992–1996: Minnesota

Administrative career (AD unless noted)
- 1998–2001: Southwest Texas State

Head coaching record
- Overall: 159–131–3
- Bowls: 0–1
- Tournaments: 4–0 (NAIA D-II playoffs); 8–2 (NCAA D-II playoffs)

Accomplishments and honors

Championships
- 2 NAIA Division II (1974–1975); 2 NCAA Division II (1981–1982); 2 NCC (1976–1977); 3 LSC (1980–1982)

Awards
- AFCA College Division Coach of the Year (1982); Bobby Dodd Coach of the Year Award (1984); Sporting News College Football COY (1984); 2× LSC Coach of the Year (1980, 1982)

James Herbert Wacker (April 28, 1937 – August 26, 2003) was an American football coach and college athletics administrator. He served as the head football coach at Texas Lutheran University (1971–1975), North Dakota State University (1976–1978), Southwest Texas State University—now Texas State University (1979–1982), Texas Christian University (1983–1991), and the University of Minnesota (1992–1996), compiling a career college football record of 159–131–3. Wacker won two NAIA Division II National Championships with Texas Lutheran in 1974 and 1975, and two NCAA Division II Football Championships with Southwest Texas State, in 1981 and 1982.

== Early life and education ==
The son of a Lutheran minister, Wacker was born and raised in Detroit. He graduated from Lutheran-affiliated Valparaiso University in 1960 and went on to further studies at Wayne State University.

== Coaching career ==
In the early phase of his coaching career, Wacker coached at Texas Lutheran University (1971–1975), North Dakota State University (1976–1978), and Southwest Texas State University (1979–1982). He won four national championships, two at Texas Lutheran and two at Southwest Texas State.

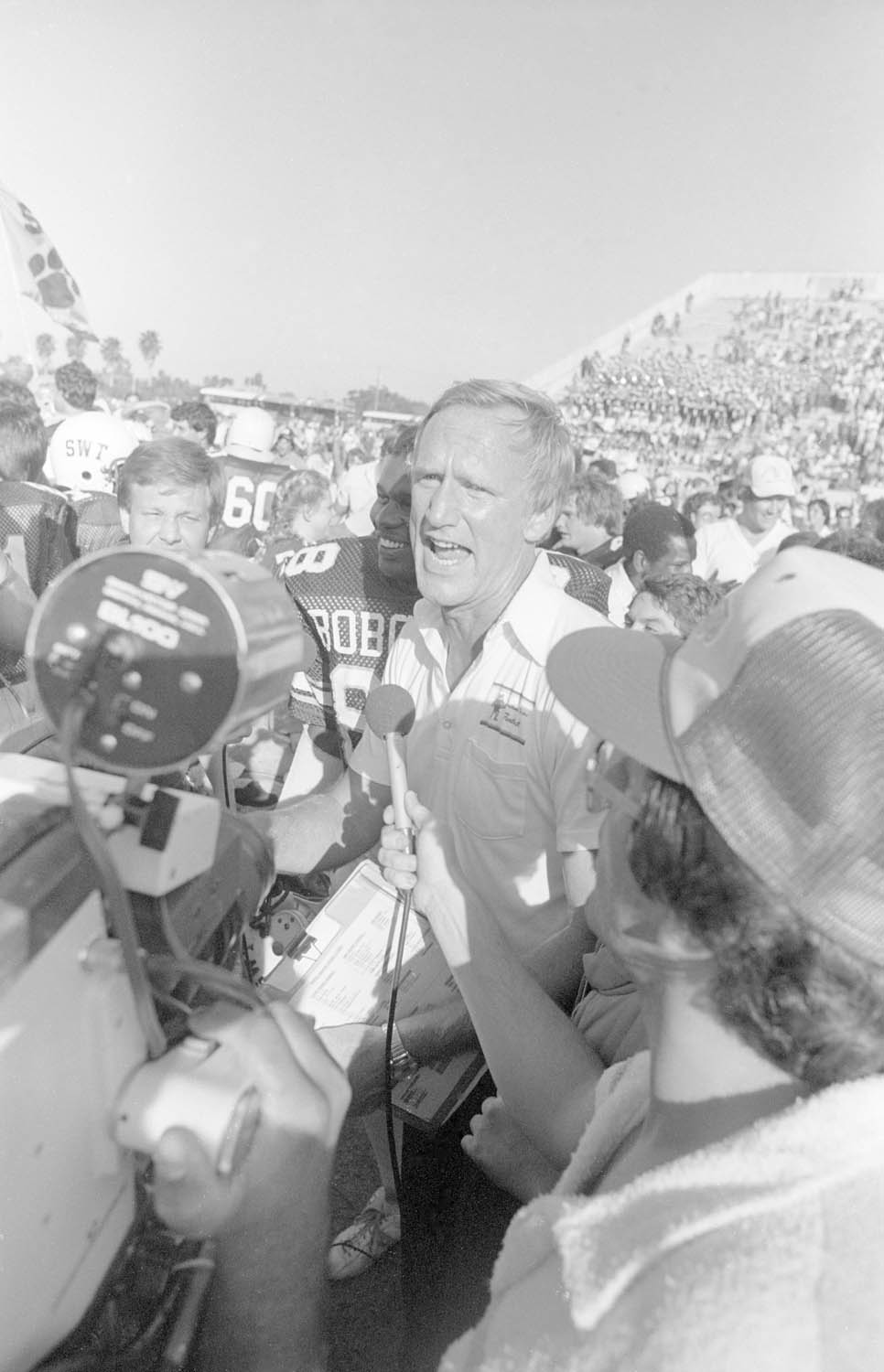
Wacker after the Palm Bowl, 1981

=== TCU ===
Wacker became head football coach of Texas Christian University after the 1982 season. He had early success at TCU. In 1984, his team was ranked as high as #12, the TCU Frogs' highest ranking since 1960, and was invited to the Bluebonnet Bowl after an 8–3 record in the regular season, their first bowl appearance in 20 years. The #12-ranked Frogs lost a showdown for the Southwest Conference title with the #10-ranked Texas Longhorns on November 10 in what remains the third best-attended game in the history of Amon G. Carter Stadium. TCU finished in a three-way tie for third in the 1984 SWC standings with Arkansas and Texas one game behind co-champions SMU and Houston. After the season, Wacker was named as National Coach of the Year by ESPN, the UPI, and The Sporting News. He was awarded the 1984 Bobby Dodd Coach of the Year Award.

There was much hype surrounding the Frogs going into the 1985 season, and Wacker appeared on the cover of Dave Campbell's Texas Football alongside his All-American running back, Kenneth Davis, a finalist for the Heisman Trophy in 1984 and a leading candidate for the award in 1985. After the first game of the season, Wacker discovered that several players, including Davis, had been benefiting from a payment plan in violation of NCAA rules. Wacker promptly kicked the players off the team and self-reported the infractions to the NCAA, cementing his reputation as a man of integrity. For all intents and purposes, this ended the Frogs' season; they finished 3-8, including a winless SWC slate.

In 1986, the NCAA slapped TCU with three years' probation and a ban on postseason play in the 1986 season. The most severe penalty in the long run, however, was a reduction to only 25 scholarships in 1987 and 1988. To this day, Horned Frog fans remain bitter that the NCAA imposed such a severe penalty given that the violations were voluntarily reported. As heavy-handed as this penalty was, the NCAA seriously considered banning the Horned Frogs from bowl games and live television for three years and no new scholarships in 1987 or 1988. However, it praised Wacker for taking swift corrective action once the violations came to light, including kicking the players off the team when he was well aware that it would cripple the team for the upcoming season. As it turned out, TCU would need the rest of the decade and much of the next to recover; they would have only two more winning records until 1997.

Wacker brought the team back to success in 1990, when the 5–1 Frogs returned to the top 25 for the first time since 1984, before slumping after a season-ending injury to their starting quarterback. In 1991, TCU finished 7–4 for their first winning season since 1984. However, blowout losses to Texas and Texas A&M kept the Horned Frogs out of a bowl. This was one of only three winning seasons TCU had from 1985 to 1997.

=== Minnesota ===
Wacker served as head coach at the University of Minnesota from 1992 to 1996. Although he had a disappointing won-lost record (16–39) at Minnesota, for three years his teams led the conference with academic all-conference honors.

== Later life, death, and honors ==
Wacker was an announcer on CBS Radio for two years and then returned to Southwest Texas State University in 1998 to serve as athletic director until 2001. He died after a long battle with cancer in San Marcos, Texas on August 26, 2003. In November 2003, Southwest Texas State named its football field at Bobcat Stadium "Jim Wacker Field" in his honor.

== Head coaching record ==
Year	Team	Overall	Conference	Standing	Bowl/playoffs	NCAA^{#}
Texas Lutheran Bulldogs (NAIA Division II independent) (1971–1975)
1971	Texas Lutheran	5–6				
1972	Texas Lutheran	3–7				
1973	Texas Lutheran	7–3				
1974	Texas Lutheran	11–0			W NAIA Division II Championship	
1975	Texas Lutheran	11–1			W NAIA Division II Championship	
Texas Lutheran:		37–17				
North Dakota State Bison (North Central Conference) (1976–1978)
1976	North Dakota State	9–3	6–0	1st	L NCAA Division II Semifinal (Grantland Rice)	T–8
1977	North Dakota State	9–2–1	6–0–1	1st	L NCAA Division II Semifinal (Grantland Rice)	1
1978	North Dakota State	6–4	3–3	T–3rd		
North Dakota State:		24–9–1	15–3–1			
Southwest Texas State Bobcats (Lone Star Conference) (1979–1982)
1979	Southwest Texas State	7–4	3–4	T–5th		
1980	Southwest Texas State	8–3	6–1	1st		8
1981	Southwest Texas State	13–1	6–1	1st	W NCAA Division II Championship	4
1982	Southwest Texas State	14–0	7–0	1st	W NCAA Division II Championship	1
Southwest Texas State:		42–8	22–6			
TCU Horned Frogs (Southwest Conference) (1983–1991)
1983	TCU	1–8–2	1–6–1	8th		
1984	TCU	8–4	5–3	T–3rd	L Astro-Bluebonnet	
1985	TCU	3–8	0–8	9th		
1986	TCU	3–8	1–7	8th		
1987	TCU	5–6	3–4	T–5th		
1988	TCU	4–7	2–5	T–5th		
1989	TCU	4–7	2–6	T–7th		
1990	TCU	5–6	3–5	T–5th		
1991	TCU	7–4	4–4	T–5th		
TCU:		40–58–2	21–48–1			
Minnesota Golden Gophers (Big Ten Conference) (1992–1996)
1992	Minnesota	2–9	2–6	10th		
1993	Minnesota	4–7	3–5	T–8th		
1994	Minnesota	3–8	1–7	11th		
1995	Minnesota	3–8	1–7	10th		
1996	Minnesota	4–7	1–7	T–9th		
Minnesota:		16–39	8–32			
Total:		159–131–3				
National championship Conference title Conference division title or championship game berth
^{#}Rankings from final Coaches Poll.; ^{°}Rankings from final AP Poll.
