= 1976 Wisconsin–Whitewater Warhawks football team =

American college football season

1976 Wisconsin–Whitewater Warhawks football
- Conference: Wisconsin State University Conference
- Record: 2–9 (2–6 WSUC)
- Head coach: Forrest Perkins (20th season)
- Home stadium: Warhawks Stadium

1976 Wisconsin State University Conference football standings
	Conf.					Overall
Team	W		L		T	W		L		T
No. 15 Wisconsin–Oshkosh +	6	–	2	–	0	8	–	2	–	0
No. 13 Wisconsin–Platteville +	6	–	2	–	0	8	–	2	–	0
Wisconsin–River Falls +	6	–	2	–	0	7	–	3	–	0
Wisconsin–La Crosse	5	–	3	–	0	7	–	3	–	0
Wisconsin–Stevens Point	5	–	3	–	0	7	–	3	–	0
Wisconsin–Eau Claire	4	–	4	–	0	5	–	5	–	0
Wisconsin–Stout	2	–	6	–	0	3	–	6	–	0
Wisconsin–Whitewater	2	–	6	–	0	2	–	9	–	0
Wisconsin–Superior	0	–	8	–	0	0	–	10	–	0
+ – Conference co-champions; Rankings from NAIA Division I poll

The 1976 Wisconsin–Whitewater Warhawks football team was an American football team that represented the University of Wisconsin–Whitewater as a member of the Wisconsin State University Conference (WSUC) during the 1976 NCAA Division III football season. Led by 20th-year head coach Forrest Perkins, the Warhawks compiled an overall record of 2–9 with a mark of 2–6 in conference play, tying for seventh place in the WSUC.

== Schedule ==
Date	Opponent	Site	Result	Attendance	Source
September 11	at St. Norbert*	De Pere, WI	L 3–6	3,200	
September 18	Wisconsin–Stevens Point	Warhawks Stadium; Whitewater, WI	W 30–24	4,526	
September 25	at Wisconsin–Stout	Menomonie, WI	L 6–13	3,300	
October 2	at Wisconsin–Platteville	Ralph E. Davis Pioneer Stadium; Platteville, WI	L 18–5	6,700	
October 9	Wisconsin–Superior	Warhawks Stadium; Whitewater, WI	W 34–6	2,000	
October 16	Northern Michigan*	Warhawks Stadium; Whitewater, WI	L 14–70	3,100	
October 23	Wisconsin–Eau Claire	Warhawks Stadium; Whitewater, WI	L 0–7	3,000	
October 30	Wisconsin–River Falls	Warhawks Stadium; Whitewater, WI	L 20–33	2,987	
November 6	Wisconsin–La Crosse	Warhawks Stadium; Whitewater, WI	L 7–16	2,600	
November 13	at Wisconsin–Oshkosh	Titan Stadium; Oshkosh, WI	L 0–33	2,000	
November 20	Northern Iowa*	Warhawks Stadium; Whitewater, WI	L 20–47	2,000	
*Non-conference game
