= 1976 Grantland Rice Bowl =

| Montana State Bobcats | North Dakota State Bison |
| (10–1) | (9–2) |
| Big Sky Conference | North Central Conference |
| 10 | 3 |
| Head coach: Sonny Holland | Head coach: Jim Wacker |
| | 1 | 2 | 3 | 4 | Total |
|---|---|---|---|---|---|
| Montana State | 0 | 0 | 7 | 3 | 10 |
| North Dakota State | 3 | 0 | 0 | 0 | 3 |
- Date: December 4, 1976
- Season: 1976
- Stadium: Dacotah Field
- Location: Fargo, North Dakota
- Attendance: 6,100

The 1976 Grantland Rice Bowl was an NCAA Division II game following the 1976 season, between the Montana State Bobcats and the North Dakota State Bison. This was the first time that the game was hosted by one of the participants – in prior years the game had been played at a fixed location; first Murfreesboro, Tennessee and later Baton Rouge, Louisiana.

== Notable participants ==
Montana State guard Lee Washburn was the last player selected in the 1978 NFL draft, and tackle Jon Borchardt was selected in the 1979 NFL draft. Quarterback Paul Dennehy and head coach Sonny Holland are inductees of the university's hall of fame.

North Dakota State defensive back Chuck Rodgers was selected in the 1977 NFL draft. Wide receiver / kicker Mike McTague was selected in the 1979 CFL draft. McTague and linebacker Rick Budde are inductees of the university's athletic hall of fame.

== Scoring summary ==
Scoring summary

| Quarter | Time | Drive | | | Team | Scoring information | Score | |
| Quarter | Time | Plays | Yards | TOP | Team | Scoring information | MSU | NDS |
|---|---|---|---|---|---|---|---|---|
| 1 | 5:43 | | | | NDS | 26-yard field goal by Mike McTague | 0 | 3 |
| 3 | 9:49 | 11 | 52 | | MSU | Butch Damberger 5-yard touchdown reception from Paul Dennehy, Jeff Muri kick good | 7 | 3 |
| 4 | 11:30 | | | | MSU | 34-yard field goal by Jeff Muri | 10 | 3 |
| "TOP" = time of possession. For other American football terms, see Glossary of American football. | | | | | | | 10 | 3 |
