= 1979 Southwest Texas State Bobcats football team =

American college football season

1979 Southwest Texas State Bobcats football
- Conference: Lone Star Conference
- Record: 7–4 (3–4 LSC)
- Head coach: Jim Wacker (1st season)
- Defensive coordinator: Bob Brush (3rd season)
- Home stadium: Evans Field

1979 Lone Star Conference football standings
	Conf.					Overall
Team	W		L		T	W		L		T
No. 2 Texas A&I $^	6	–	1	–	0	12	–	1	–	0
No. 17 Stephen F. Austin	5	–	2	–	0	8	–	3	–	0
No. 7 Angelo State ^	5	–	2	–	0	9	–	3	–	0
East Texas State	5	–	2	–	0	5	–	5	–	0
Abilene Christian	3	–	4	–	0	7	–	4	–	0
No. 19 Southwest Texas State	3	–	4	–	0	7	–	4	–	0
Howard Payne	1	–	6	–	0	2	–	8	–	0
Sam Houston State	0	–	7	–	0	1	–	9	–	0
$ – Conference champion; ^ – NAIA Division I playoff participant; Rankings from NAIA Division I poll

The 1979 Southwest Texas State Bobcats football team was an American football team that represented Southwest Texas State University (now known as Texas State University) during the 1979 NAIA Division I football season as a member of the Lone Star Conference (LSC). In their first year under head coach Jim Wacker, the team compiled an overall record of 7–4, with a mark of 3–4 in conference play.

== Schedule ==
Date	Opponent	Site	Result	Attendance	Source
September 1	vs. Prairie View A&M*	Alamo Stadium; San Antonio, TX	W 38–13	6,000	
September 8	at Texas Lutheran*	Matador Field; Seguin, TX	W 19–5	7,500	
September 22	at Southeastern Louisiana*	Strawberry Stadium; Hammond, LA	W 14–7	9,000	
September 29	at Howard Payne	Cen-Tex Stadium; Brownwood, TX	W 36–9	4,000	
October 6	Cameron State*	Evans Field; San Marcos, TX	W 28–20	7,500	
October 13	Sam Houston State	Evans Field; San Marcos, TX (rivalry)	W 40–22	8,000	
October 20	at Stephen F. Austin	Lumberjack Stadium; Nacogdoches, TX	L 14–28	13,000	
October 27	East Texas State	Evans Field; San Marcos, TX	W 45–14	6,800	
November 3	at Angelo State	San Angelo Stadium; San Angelo, TX	L 3–14	6,545	
November 10	at Abilene Christian	Shotwell Stadium; Abilene, TX	L 24–28	6,000	
November 17	Texas A&I	Evans Field; San Marcos, TX	L 10–42		
*Non-conference game
