= 1976 Northern Iowa Panthers football team =

American college football season

1976 Northern Iowa Panthers football
- Conference: North Central Conference
- Record: 8–3 (4–2 NCC)
- Head coach: Stan Sheriff (17th season)
- Defensive coordinator: Dennis Remmert (6th season)
- Home stadium: UNI-Dome

1976 North Central Conference football standings
	Conf.					Overall
Team	W		L		T	W		L		T
No. T–8 North Dakota State $^	6	–	0	–	0	9	–	3	–	0
South Dakota State	4	–	1	–	1	5	–	4	–	1
Northern Iowa	4	–	2	–	0	8	–	3	–	0
South Dakota	3	–	2	–	1	4	–	5	–	1
North Dakota	1	–	4	–	1	1	–	7	–	1
Augustana (SD)	1	–	5	–	0	4	–	6	–	0
Morningside	0	–	5	–	1	1	–	7	–	1
$ – Conference champion; ^ – NCAA Division II playoff participant; Rankings from AP Poll

The 1976 Northern Iowa Panthers football team was an American football team that represented the University of Northern Iowa as a member of the North Central Conference (NCC) during the 1976 NCAA Division II football season. In its 17th season under head coach Stan Sheriff, the team compiled an 8–3 record (4–2 in conference games) and finished in third place in the NCC.

The team's statistical leaders included senior fullback Neal Moses (1,010 rushing yards), sophomore quarterback Terry Allen (1,119 passing yards, 84 points scored), and sophomore wide receiver Rick Van Huel (459 receiving yards). Five Northern Iowa players were named to the all-NCC team: Moses; offensive tackle Dallas Deike; defensive tackle Mel Campbell; defensive end Marty Stratton; and free safety Nick Maragos.

The team played its home games at the UNI-Dome in Cedar Falls, Iowa. It was the Panthers' first season at the UNI-Dome. The Panthers' first game at the dome was a 41–7 loss to Northern Michigan on September 4, 1976. They won their first game at the dome on September 18 against Nebraska–Omaha.

== Schedule ==
Date	Opponent	Site	Result	Attendance	Source
September 4	Northern Michigan*	UNI-Dome; Cedar Falls, IA	L 7–41	12,000	
September 18	Nebraska–Omaha*	UNI-Dome; Cedar Falls, IA	W 34–13	8,260	
September 25	at St. Cloud State*	St. Cloud, MN	W 2–0	2,500	
October 2	at North Dakota	Memorial Stadium; Grand Forks, ND	W 24–22	5,700	
October 9	at Augustana (SD)	Sioux Falls, SD	W 7–6	5,993	
October 16	Wayne State (NE)*	UNI-Dome; Cedar Falls, IA	W 38–0	9,400	
October 23	Morningside	UNI-Dome; Cedar Falls, IA	W 37–7	14,200	
October 30	South Dakota State	UNI-Dome; Cedar Falls, IA	L 13–16	8,100	
November 6	at South Dakota	Inman Field; Vermillion, SD	W 14–7	2,200	
November 13	North Dakota State	UNI-Dome; Cedar Falls, IA	L 9–10	15,100	
November 20	at Wisconsin–Whitewater*	Perkins Stadium; Whitewater, WI	W 47–20	800	
*Non-conference game
