= Gordon Bahr =

American football coach (1914–1991)

Biographical details
- Born: May 19, 1914; Sheboygan, Wisconsin, U.S.
- Died: May 5, 1991 (aged 76); La Crosse County, Wisconsin, U.S.

Coaching career (HC unless noted)

Football
- 1945: La Crosse State

Gordon Harry Bahr (May 19, 1914 – May 5, 1991) was an American football coach. He served as the head football coach at the University of Wisconsin–La Crosse in 1945. Additionally, He had been a coach and teacher at Central High School and Lincoln Jr. High School and was the Audio Visual Coordinator for the LaCrosse School District for five years prior to his retirement.
