= 1979 Wisconsin–Whitewater Warhawks football team =

American college football season

1979 Wisconsin–Whitewater Warhawks football
- Conference: Wisconsin State University Conference
- Record: 7–4 (6–2 WSUC)
- Head coach: Forrest Perkins (23rd season)
- Home stadium: Warhawks Stadium

1979 Wisconsin State University Conference football standings
	Conf.					Overall
Team	W		L		T	W		L		T
No. 4 Wisconsin–River Falls $^	7	–	1	–	0	9	–	2	–	0
No. 20 Wisconsin–La Crosse	6	–	2	–	0	7	–	2	–	0
Wisconsin–Whitewater	6	–	2	–	0	7	–	4	–	0
Wisconsin–Stout	4	–	4	–	0	6	–	4	–	0
Wisconsin–Stevens Point	4	–	4	–	0	5	–	5	–	0
Wisconsin–Oshkosh	3	–	5	–	0	5	–	5	–	0
Wisconsin–Platteville	3	–	5	–	0	5	–	5	–	0
Wisconsin–Eau Claire	3	–	5	–	0	3	–	7	–	0
Wisconsin–Superior	0	–	8	–	0	1	–	10	–	0
$ – Conference champion; ^ – NAIA Division I playoff participant Wisconsin–Eau Claire forfeited two non-conference games.; Rankings from NAIA Division I poll

The 1979 Wisconsin–Whitewater Warhawks football team was an American football team that represented the University of Wisconsin–Whitewater as a member of the Wisconsin State University Conference (WSUC) during the 1979 NAIA Division I football season. Led by 23rd-year head coach Forrest Perkins, the Warhawks compiled an overall record of 7–4 and a mark of 6–2 in conference play, tying for second place in the WSUC.

== Schedule ==
Date	Opponent	Site	Result	Attendance
September 1	at Western Illinois*	Hanson Field; Macomb, IL	L 7–13	9,400
September 8	South Dakota State*	Warhawks Stadium; Whitewater, WI	L 7–27	
September 15	Wisconsin–Platteville	Warhawks Stadium; Whitewater, WI	W 27–0	
September 22	at Wisconsin–Superior	Superior, WI	W 55–7	
September 29	at Wisconsin–Stevens Point	Goerke Field; Stevens Point, WI	W 23–21	
October 6	Wisconsin–Stout	Warhawks Stadium; Whitewater, WI	W 21–7	
October 13	vs. Morningside*	Mexico City, Mexico	W 24–7	
October 20	at Wisconsin–River Falls	River Falls, Wisconsin	L 13–26	
October 27	Wisconsin–Eau Claire	Warhawks Stadium; Whitewater, WI	W 13–26	
November 3	at Wisconsin–La Crosse	Veterans Memorial Stadium; La Crosse, WI	L 28–47	
November 10	Wisconsin–Oshkosh	Warhawks Stadium; Whitewater, WI	W 33–16	
*Non-conference game
