= 1976 North Dakota State Bison football team =

American college football season

1976 North Dakota State Bison football

NCC champion

Grantland Rice Bowl, L 3–10 vs. Montana State
- Conference: North Central Conference
- Record: 9–3 (6–0 NCC)
- Head coach: Jim Wacker (1st season)
- Home stadium: Dacotah Field

1976 North Central Conference football standings
	Conf.					Overall
Team	W		L		T	W		L		T
No. T–8 North Dakota State $^	6	–	0	–	0	9	–	3	–	0
South Dakota State	4	–	1	–	1	5	–	4	–	1
Northern Iowa	4	–	2	–	0	8	–	3	–	0
South Dakota	3	–	2	–	1	4	–	5	–	1
North Dakota	1	–	4	–	1	1	–	7	–	1
Augustana (SD)	1	–	5	–	0	4	–	6	–	0
Morningside	0	–	5	–	1	1	–	7	–	1
$ – Conference champion; ^ – NCAA Division II playoff participant; Rankings from AP Poll

The 1976 North Dakota State Bison football team was an American football team that represented North Dakota State University during the 1976 NCAA Division II football season as a member of the North Central Conference. In their first year under head coach Jim Wacker, the team compiled a 9–3 record, finished as NCC champion, and lost to Montana State in the Grantland Rice Bowl.

== Schedule ==
Date	Opponent	Rank	Site	Result	Attendance	Source
September 11	at Northern Michigan*		Memorial Field; Marquette, MI	L 9–14	8,946	
September 18	at Montana State*		Reno H. Sales Stadium; Bozeman, MT	L 7–34	2,300	
September 25	Morningside		Dacotah Field; Fargo, ND	W 16–7	7,200	
October 2	South Dakota State^{†}		Dacotah Field; Fargo, ND (rivalry)	W 13–0	9,400	
October 9	St. Norbert*		Dacotah Field; Fargo, ND	W 62–29	2,200	
October 16	Augustana (SD)		Dacotah Field; Fargo, ND	W 21–0	2,600	
October 23	at North Dakota		Memorial Stadium; Grand Forks, ND (Nickel Trophy)	W 22–15	13,400	
October 30	at South Dakota		Inman Field; Vermillion, SD	W 24–0	3,500	
November 6	Northern Colorado*		Dacotah Field; Fargo, ND	W 24–0	3,800	
November 13	at Northern Iowa		UNI-Dome; Cedar Falls, IA	W 10–9	15,100	
November 27	at No. 5 Eastern Kentucky	No. T–8	Hanger Field; Richmond, KY (NCAA Division II Quarterfinal)	W 10–7	3,360	
December 4	No. 1 Montana State	No. T–8	Dacotah Field; Fargo, ND (Grantland Rice Bowl—NCAA Division II Semifinal)	L 3–10	6,100	
*Non-conference game; ^{†}Homecoming; Rankings from AP Poll released prior to the game
