= 1979 Central State Bronchos football team =

American college football season

1979 Central State Bronchos football

NAIA Division I Championship, L 14–20 vs. Texas A&I
- Conference: Independent
- Record: 11–2
- Head coach: Gary Howard (3rd season)
- Home stadium: Wantland Stadium

1979 NAIA Division I independents football records
	Conf.			Overall
Team	W	L	T	W		L		T
Liberty Baptist		–		9	–	1	–	1
No. 5 Central State (OK) ^		–		11	–	2	–	0
Kentucky State		–		6	–	5	–	0
Wofford		–		5	–	5	–	0
Guilford		–		4	–	5	–	0
Eastern New Mexico		–		4	–	6	–	0
Cameron		–		3	–	7	–	0
Langston		–		1	–	8	–	0
^ – NAIA Division I playoff participant; Rankings from NAIA Division I poll

The 1979 Central State Bronchos football team represented Central State University (OK) (now University of Central Oklahoma) during the 1979 NAIA Division I football season, and completed the 74th season of Broncho football. The Bronchos played their home games at Wantland Stadium in Edmond, Oklahoma, which has been Central's home stadium since 1965. The 1979 team returned to the NAIA after a brief stint in NCAA Division II. The 1979 team was led by coach Gary Howard in his third season. The team finished the regular season with a 9–1 record and made the program's third appearance in the NAIA playoffs after and first since 1972. The Bronchos advanced to the National Championship Game where they lost to the Texas A&I Javelinas 20–14.

== Schedule ==
Date	Opponent	Rank	Site	Result	Source
September 8	Evangel		Wantland Stadium; Edmond, OK	W 55–0	
September 15	Southwestern Oklahoma State		Wantland Stadium; Edmond, OK	W 28–0	
September 22	at Northwestern Oklahoma State		Ranger Field; Alva, OK	W 49–0	
September 29	at East Texas State		Memorial Stadium; Commerce, TX	W 17–6	
October 6	at East Central		Norris Field; Ada, OK	W 35–28	
October 20	Eastern New Mexico		Wantland Stadium; Edmond, OK	W 20–0	
October 27	at Cameron		Cameron Stadium; Lawton, OK	W 35–14	
November 3	vs. Langston		Taft Stadium; Oklahoma City, OK	W 48–6	
November 10	at Northeastern State		Gable Field; Tahlequah, OK (rivalry)	L 14–22	
November 17	Texas Lutheran	No. 5	Wantland Stadium; Edmond, OK	W 30–20	
December 1	at No. 3 Kearney State	No. 5	Foster Field; Kearney, NE (NAIA quarterfinal)	W 42–22	
December 8	No. 1 Presbyterian	No. 5	Wantland Stadium; Edmond, OK (NAIA Semifinal)	W 28–6	
December 15	vs. No. 2 Texas A&I	No. 5	McAllen, TX (NAIA Championship, Palm Bowl)	L 14–20	
Rankings from Coaches' Poll released prior to the game

== After the season ==
=== Honors ===
The NAIA recognized running back, Steve Tate, center Kirk Condry, and quarter back Scott Burger as second team All-Americans.

=== NFL draft ===
The following Broncho was selected in the National Football League draft following the season.

Round	Pick	Player	Position	NFL team
11	299	Terry Jones	Defensive end	Tampa Bay Buccaneers
