= Bill Vickroy =

American football player and administrator (1921–2003)

Profile
- Position: Center

Personal information
- Born: June 24, 1921; Toledo, Ohio, U.S.
- Died: May 11, 2003 (aged 81); La Crosse, Wisconsin, U.S.
- Listed height: 5 ft 11 in (1.80 m)
- Listed weight: 182 lb (83 kg)

Career information
- High school: Scott
- College: Ohio State (1940–1942)
- NFL draft: 1943: 12th round, 105 (by the Cleveland Rams)th overall pick

Career history

Coaching
- La Crosse State (1953–1968)

Operations
- NAIA president (?–?); Wisconsin–La Crosse (athletic director, 1979–?)

Awards and highlights
- National champion (1942)

Esten William Vickroy Jr. (June 24, 1921 – May 11, 2003) was an American college football player and coach and athletics administrator. He played college football at Ohio State University from 1940 to 1942. Vickroy served as the head football coach at La Crosse State Teachers College—now known as the University of Wisconsin–La Crosse—from 1952 to 1968, compiled a record of 86–61–6. He was later the athletic director at Wisconsin–La Crosse and president of the National Association of Intercollegiate Athletics (NAIA). He is a member of the University of Wisconsin and NAIA Halls of Fame.

== Head coaching record ==
| Year | Team | Overall | Conference | Standing | Bowl/playoffs |
|---|---|---|---|---|---|
La Crosse State Indians (Wisconsin State College/University Conference) (1953–1968)
| 1952 | La Crosse State | 8–1 | 4–0 | 1st (Northern) | |
| 1953 | La Crosse State | 9–0–1 | 5–0 | 1st | T Cigar |
| 1954 | La Crosse State | 6–2–1 | 4–0–1 | 1st | |
| 1955 | La Crosse State | 4–4–1 | 4–1 | T–2nd | |
| 1956 | La Crosse State | 3–6 | 2–3 | T–5th | |
| 1957 | La Crosse State | 4–5 | 2–3 | T–6th | |
| 1958 | La Crosse State | 5–3 | 3–3 | T–5th | |
| 1959 | La Crosse State | 8–1 | 5–1 | 2nd | |
| 1960 | La Crosse State | 5–4 | 4–2 | T–2nd | |
| 1961 | La Crosse State | 5–3 | 5–1 | 2nd | |
| 1962 | La Crosse State | 4–5 | 4–3 | 5th | |
| 1963 | La Crosse State | 0–8–1 | 0–6–1 | 10th | |
| 1964 | La Crosse State | 5–4 | 4–2 | 2nd | |
| 1965 | La Crosse State | 5–3–1 | 4–1–1 | T–2nd | |
| 1966 | La Crosse State | 6–3 | 5–3 | 4th | |
| 1967 | La Crosse State | 4–4–1 | 4–3–1 | 4th | |
| 1968 | La Crosse State | 5–5 | 5–3 | T–3rd | |
| La Crosse State: | | 86–61–6 | 64–35–4 | | |
| Total: | | 86–61–6 | | | |
National championship Conference title Conference division title or championship game berth
