= Fred G. Carter =

American college football and basketball coach, hospital administrator (1888–1956)

Biographical details
- Born: February 28, 1888; West Lima, Wisconsin, U.S.
- Died: February 19, 1956 (aged 67); Cleveland, Ohio, U.S.

Playing career

Football
- 1909–1910: Wisconsin

Coaching career (HC unless noted)

Football
- 1911: La Crosse HS (WI)
- 1912–1914: La Crosse Normal
- 1916: Colorado Mines
- 1918: Wisconsin (assistant)

Basketball
- 1916–1917: Colorado Mines

Administrative career (AD unless noted)
- 1911–1912: La Crosse HS (WI)
- 1912–1915: La Crosse Normal
- 1916–1917: Colorado Mines

Head coaching record
- Overall: 9–13–3 (college football); 0–8 (college basketball)

Frederick Gay Carter (February 28, 1888 – February 19, 1956) was an American college football and college basketball coach and hospital administrator. He served as the head football coach at La Crosse State Normal School—now known as the University of Wisconsin–La Crosse—from 1912 to 1914 and at the Colorado School of Mines in 1916. Carter was later president of the American Hospital Association and vice president of development at St. Luke's Hospital in Cleveland. He died there on February 19, 1956.

== Head coaching record ==
=== College football ===
Year	Team	Overall	Conference	Standing	Bowl/playoffs
La Crosse Normal Eagles (Independent) (1912)
1912	La Crosse Normal	2–4			
La Crosse Normal Eagles (Wisconsin Normal Athletic Conference) (1913–1914)
1913	La Crosse Normal	2–2–2	1–1–1	4th	
1914	La Crosse Normal	2–5	2–2	T–3rd	
La Crosse Normal:		6–11–2	3–3–1		
Colorado Mines Orediggers (Rocky Mountain Conference) (1916)
1916	Colorado Mines	3–2–1	2–2–1	T–4th	
Colorado Mines:		3–2–1	2–2–1		
Total:		9–13–3			
