= 1979 Sam Houston State Bearkats football team =

American college football season

1979 Sam Houston State Bearkats football
- Conference: Lone Star Conference
- Record: 1–9 (0–7 LSC)
- Head coach: Melvin Brown (2nd season)
- Home stadium: Pritchett Field

1979 Lone Star Conference football standings
	Conf.					Overall
Team	W		L		T	W		L		T
No. 2 Texas A&I $^	6	–	1	–	0	12	–	1	–	0
No. 17 Stephen F. Austin	5	–	2	–	0	8	–	3	–	0
No. 7 Angelo State ^	5	–	2	–	0	9	–	3	–	0
East Texas State	5	–	2	–	0	5	–	5	–	0
Abilene Christian	3	–	4	–	0	7	–	4	–	0
No. 19 Southwest Texas State	3	–	4	–	0	7	–	4	–	0
Howard Payne	1	–	6	–	0	2	–	8	–	0
Sam Houston State	0	–	7	–	0	1	–	9	–	0
$ – Conference champion; ^ – NAIA Division I playoff participant; Rankings from NAIA Division I poll

The 1979 Sam Houston State Bearkats football team represented Sam Houston State University as a member of the Lone Star Conference (LSC) during the 1979 NAIA Division I football season. Led by second-year head coach Melvin Brown, the Bearkats compiled an overall record of 1–9 with a mark of 0–7 in conference play, and finished eighth in the LSC.

== Schedule ==
Date	Opponent	Site	Result	Source
September 8	Southwestern Oklahoma State*	Pritchett Field; Huntsville, TX	L 29–33	
September 15	at Nicholls State*	John L. Guidry Stadium; Thibodaux, LA	L 10–29	
September 29	Texas Lutheran*	Pritchett Field; Huntsville, TX	W 32–9	
October 6	at East Texas State	Memorial Stadium; Commerce, TX	L 21–65	
October 13	at Southwest Texas State	Evans Field; San Marcos, TX (rivalry)	L 22–40	
October 20	Texas A&I	Pritchett Field; Huntsville, TX	L 10–49	
October 27	at Howard Payne	Cen-Tex Stadium; Brownwood, TX	L 13–15	
November 3	Abilene Christian	Pritchett Field; Huntsville, TX	L 14–31	
November 10	Angelo State	Pritchett Field; Huntsville, TX	L 16–17	
November 17	at Stephen F. Austin	Lumberjack Stadium; Nacogdoches, TX (rivalry)	L 20–42	
*Non-conference game
