= 1979 Texas A&I Javelinas football team =

American college football season

1979 Texas A&I Javelinas football

NAIA Division I national champion LSC champion

Palm Bowl, W 20–14 vs. Central State (OK)
- Conference: Lone Star Conference
- Record: 12–1 (6–1 LSC)
- Head coach: Ron Harms (1st season)
- Captains: Randy Friedrich; Andy Hawkins; Mike Sheffield; Martin Stroman
- Home stadium: Javelina Stadium

1979 Lone Star Conference football standings
	Conf.					Overall
Team	W		L		T	W		L		T
No. 2 Texas A&I $^	6	–	1	–	0	12	–	1	–	0
No. 17 Stephen F. Austin	5	–	2	–	0	8	–	3	–	0
No. 7 Angelo State ^	5	–	2	–	0	9	–	3	–	0
East Texas State	5	–	2	–	0	5	–	5	–	0
Abilene Christian	3	–	4	–	0	7	–	4	–	0
No. 19 Southwest Texas State	3	–	4	–	0	7	–	4	–	0
Howard Payne	1	–	6	–	0	2	–	8	–	0
Sam Houston State	0	–	7	–	0	1	–	9	–	0
$ – Conference champion; ^ – NAIA Division I playoff participant; Rankings from NAIA Division I poll

The 1979 Texas A&I Javelinas football team was an American football team that represented the Texas College of Arts and Industries (now known as Texas A&M University–Kingsville) as a member of the Lone Star Conference during the 1979 NAIA Division I football season. In its first year under head coach Ron Harms, the team compiled a 12–1 record (6–1 against conference opponents), won the Lone Star Conference championship, and defeated Central State (Oklahoma) in the Palm Bowl to win the NAIA national championship.

The team played its home games at Javelina Stadium in Kingsville, Texas.

== Schedule ==
Date	Opponent	Site	Result	Attendance	Source
September 8	at Troy State*	Veterans Memorial Stadium; Troy, AL	W 7–6		
September 15	East Central (OK)*	Javelina Stadium; Kingsville, TX	W 41–21	11,500	
September 29	vs. Texas Southern*	Alamo Stadium; San Antonio, TX	W 31–7		
October 6	Abilene Christian	Javelina Stadium; Kingsville, TX	W 37–21		
October 13	Stephen F. Austin	Javelina Stadium; Kingsville, TX	W 31–10		
October 20	at Sam Houston State	Pritchett Field; Huntsville, TX	W 49–10		
October 27	Angelo State	Javelina Stadium; Kingsville, TX	W 24–8		
November 3	at East Texas State	Memorial Stadium; Commerce, TX	L 0–3		
November 10	Howard Payne	Javelina Stadium; Kingsville, TX	W 56–10		
November 17	at Southwest Texas State	Evans Field; San Marcos, TX	W 42–10		
December 1	Western State (CO)	Javelina Stadium; Kingsville, TX (NAIA Division I quarterfinal)	W 38–14		
December 8	Angelo State	Javelina Stadium; Kingsville, TX (NAIA Division I semifinal)	W 22–19	7,000	
December 15	vs. Central State (OK)	McAllen, TX (Palm Bowl)	W 20–14		
*Non-conference game
