= 1979 NAIA Division I football season =

American college football season

- Regular season: August–November 1979
- Postseason: December 1–15, 1979
- National Championship: McAllen Veterans Memorial Stadium; McAllen, TX
- Champions: Texas A&I (6)

The 1979 NAIA Division I football season was the 24th season of college football sponsored by the NAIA, was the 10th season of play of the NAIA's top division for football.

The season was played from August to November 1979 and culminated in the 1979 NAIA Division I Football National Championship. Known again this year as the Palm Bowl, the title game was played on December 15, 1979, at McAllen Veterans Memorial Stadium in McAllen, Texas.

The Texas A&I Javelinas defeated the Central State Bronchos in the Palm Bowl, 20–14, to win their sixth NAIA national title.

== Conference realignment ==
=== Membership changes ===
Team	1978 conference	1979 conference
Eastern Washington	Evergreen (NAIA)	Independent (NCAA Division II)

== Conference standings ==
1979 Arkansas Intercollegiate Conference football standings
	Conf.					Overall
Team	W		L		T	W		L		T
No. 11 Arkansas–Monticello $	5	–	1	–	0	9	–	2	–	0
Henderson State	4	–	2	–	0	5	–	5	–	0
Arkansas Tech	3	–	2	–	1	3	–	6	–	1
Central Arkansas	2	–	2	–	2	7	–	2	–	2
Ouachita Baptist	2	–	4	–	0	5	–	5	–	0
Harding	2	–	4	–	0	4	–	6	–	0
Southern Arkansas	1	–	4	–	1	3	–	6	–	1
$ – Conference champion; Rankings from NAIA Division I poll

1979 Central States Intercollegiate Conference football standings
	Conf.					Overall
Team	W		L		T	W		L		T
No. 3 Kearney State +^	6	–	1	–	0	8	–	2	–	0
Pittsburg State +	6	–	1	–	0	7	–	3	–	0
Missouri Western	3	–	4	–	0	7	–	4	–	0
Missouri Southern	3	–	4	–	0	5	–	5	–	0
Wayne State (NE)	3	–	4	–	0	4	–	5	–	1
Fort Hays State	3	–	4	–	0	4	–	6	–	0
Emporia State	2	–	5	–	0	4	–	6	–	0
Washburn	2	–	5	–	0	4	–	6	–	0
+ – Conference co-champions; ^ – NAIA Division I playoff participant; Rankings from NAIA Division I poll

1979 Evergreen Conference football standings
	Conf.					Overall
Team	W		L		T	W		L		T
No. 13 Oregon College $	5	–	0	–	0	8	–	1	–	1
No. T–15 Oregon Tech	3	–	2	–	0	7	–	2	–	0
Eastern Oregon	3	–	2	–	0	6	–	3	–	0
Western Washington	2	–	3	–	0	4	–	5	–	0
Southern Oregon	1	–	4	–	0	2	–	7	–	0
Central Washington	1	–	4	–	0	1	–	8	–	1
$ – Conference champion; Rankings from NAIA Division I poll

1979 Great Lakes Intercollegiate Athletic Conference football standings
	Conf.					Overall
Team	W		L		T	W		L		T
No. 8 Saginaw Valley State $^	4	–	0	–	1	8	–	2	–	1
Wayne State (MI)	3	–	1	–	1	3	–	5	–	1
Ferris State	3	–	2	–	0	5	–	4	–	1
Grand Valley State	2	–	3	–	0	4	–	5	–	0
Northwood	1	–	4	–	0	5	–	4	–	0
Hillsdale	1	–	4	–	0	3	–	8	–	0
$ – Conference champion; ^ – NAIA Division I playoff participant; Rankings from NAIA Division I poll

1979 Lone Star Conference football standings
	Conf.					Overall
Team	W		L		T	W		L		T
No. 2 Texas A&I $^	6	–	1	–	0	12	–	1	–	0
No. 17 Stephen F. Austin	5	–	2	–	0	8	–	3	–	0
No. 7 Angelo State ^	5	–	2	–	0	9	–	3	–	0
East Texas State	5	–	2	–	0	5	–	5	–	0
Abilene Christian	3	–	4	–	0	7	–	4	–	0
No. 19 Southwest Texas State	3	–	4	–	0	7	–	4	–	0
Howard Payne	1	–	6	–	0	2	–	8	–	0
Sam Houston State	0	–	7	–	0	1	–	9	–	0
$ – Conference champion; ^ – NAIA Division I playoff participant; Rankings from NAIA Division I poll

1979 Northern Intercollegiate Conference football standings
	Conf.					Overall
Team	W		L		T	W		L		T
Minnesota Duluth +	7	–	1	–	0	8	–	2	–	0
Moorhead State +	7	–	1	–	0	8	–	3	–	0
Minnesota Morris ^	6	–	2	–	0	9	–	2	–	0
St. Cloud State	5	–	3	–	0	5	–	6	–	0
Mankato State	4	–	4	–	0	5	–	5	–	0
Michigan Tech	4	–	4	–	0	4	–	6	–	0
Southwest State (MN)	2	–	6	–	0	4	–	7	–	0
Bemidji State	1	–	7	–	0	1	–	8	–	1
Winona State	0	–	8	–	0	0	–	11	–	0
+ – Conference co-champions; ^ – NCAA Division III playoff participant

1979 Oklahoma Intercollegiate Conference football standings
	Conf.					Overall
Team	W		L		T	W		L		T
East Central $	4	–	0	–	0	6	–	4	–	0
No. 18 SW Oklahoma State	3	–	1	–	0	7	–	2	–	0
No. 12 Northeastern State	2	–	2	–	0	8	–	2	–	0
SE Oklahoma State	1	–	3	–	0	2	–	8	–	0
NW Oklahoma State	0	–	4	–	0	2	–	8	–	0
$ – Conference champion; Rankings from NAIA Division I poll

1979 Rocky Mountain Athletic Conference football standings
	Conf.					Overall
Team	W		L		T	W		L		T
No. 6 Western State (CO) $^	7	–	1	–	0	8	–	2	–	0
No. 14 Southern Colorado	6	–	2	–	0	8	–	2	–	0
Colorado Mines	5	–	3	–	0	6	–	4	–	0
Adams State	4	–	4	–	0	5	–	5	–	0
Fort Lewis	4	–	4	–	0	5	–	5	–	0
Southern Utah	3	–	5	–	0	4	–	6	–	0
New Mexico Highlands	3	–	5	–	0	3	–	7	–	0
Western New Mexico	2	–	6	–	0	2	–	7	–	0
Mesa	1	–	7	–	0	1	–	8	–	0
$ – Conference champion; ^ – NAIA Division I playoff participant; Rankings from NAIA Division I poll

1979 South Atlantic Conference football standings
	Conf.					Overall
Team	W		L		T	W		L		T
No. 1 Presbyterian $^	7	–	0	–	0	11	–	2	–	0
No. 9 Mars Hill	5	–	1	–	0	7	–	2	–	1
Carson–Newman	4	–	3	–	0	6	–	4	–	0
Elon	3	–	4	–	0	5	–	5	–	0
Newberry	3	–	4	–	0	5	–	5	–	0
Lenoir–Rhyne	2	–	4	–	0	5	–	5	–	0
Catawba	2	–	5	–	0	3	–	8	–	0
Gardner–Webb	1	–	6	–	0	4	–	7	–	0
$ – Conference champion; ^ – NAIA Division I playoff participant; Rankings from NAIA Division I poll

1979 West Virginia Intercollegiate Athletic Conference football standings
	Conf.					Overall
Team	W		L		T	W		L		T
Northern Division
No. 10 Fairmont State xy$	7	–	1	–	1	9	–	1	–	1
No. T–15th West Liberty State x	7	–	1	–	1	7	–	2	–	1
Salem	6	–	2	–	1	6	–	3	–	1
Shepherd	5	–	4	–	0	5	–	5	–	0
West Virginia Wesleyan	1	–	8	–	0	1	–	8	–	0
Southern Division
West Virginia State xy	6	–	3	–	0	6	–	5	–	0
Concord	4	–	3	–	2	5	–	3	–	2
Glenville State	3	–	6	–	0	4	–	6	–	0
West Virginia Tech	1	–	6	–	2	1	–	6	–	2
Bluefield State	1	–	7	–	1	1	–	8	–	1
Championship: Fairmont State 14, West Virginia State 13
$ – Conference champion; x – Division champion/co-champions; y – Championship game participant; Rankings from NAIA Division I poll

1979 Wisconsin State University Conference football standings
	Conf.					Overall
Team	W		L		T	W		L		T
No. 4 Wisconsin–River Falls $^	7	–	1	–	0	9	–	2	–	0
No. 20 Wisconsin–La Crosse	6	–	2	–	0	7	–	2	–	0
Wisconsin–Whitewater	6	–	2	–	0	7	–	4	–	0
Wisconsin–Stout	4	–	4	–	0	6	–	4	–	0
Wisconsin–Stevens Point	4	–	4	–	0	5	–	5	–	0
Wisconsin–Oshkosh	3	–	5	–	0	5	–	5	–	0
Wisconsin–Platteville	3	–	5	–	0	5	–	5	–	0
Wisconsin–Eau Claire	3	–	5	–	0	3	–	7	–	0
Wisconsin–Superior	0	–	8	–	0	1	–	10	–	0
$ – Conference champion; ^ – NAIA Division I playoff participant Wisconsin–Eau Claire forfeited two non-conference games.; Rankings from NAIA Division I poll

1979 NAIA Division I independents football records
	Conf.			Overall
Team	W	L	T	W		L		T
Liberty Baptist		–		9	–	1	–	1
No. 5 Central State (OK) ^		–		11	–	2	–	0
Kentucky State		–		6	–	5	–	0
Wofford		–		5	–	5	–	0
Guilford		–		4	–	5	–	0
Eastern New Mexico		–		4	–	6	–	0
Cameron		–		3	–	7	–	0
Langston		–		1	–	8	–	0
^ – NAIA Division I playoff participant; Rankings from NAIA Division I poll

== Conference champions ==
Conference	Champion	Record
Arkansas	Arkansas–Monticello	5–1
Central States	Kearney State; Pittsburg State	6–1
Evergreen	Oregon College	5–0
Great Lakes	Saginaw Valley State	4–0–1
Lone Star	Texas A&I	6–1
NIC	Minnesota–Duluth; Moorhead State (MN)	7–1
Oklahoma	East Central State	4–0
RMAC	Western State (CO)	7–1
South Atlantic	Presbyterian	7–0
WVIAC	North: Fairmont and West Liberty State; South: West Virginia State	6–2–1; 6–3
Wisconsin State	Wisconsin–River Falls	7–1

== Postseason ==
Quarterfinals; December 1, 1979; Campus sites
Saginaw Valley State	3
Presbyterian*	36
Central State (OK)	42
Kearney State*	22
Wisconsin–River Falls	7
Angelo State*	31
Western State (CO)	14
Texas A&I*	38

Semifinals; December 8, 1979; Campus sites
Presbyterian	6
Central State (OK)*	28
Angelo State	19
Texas A&I*	22

1979 Palm Bowl; December 15, 1979; McAllen, TX
Central State (OK)	14
Texas A&I	20

== See also ==
- 1979 NAIA Division II football season
- 1979 NCAA Division I-A football season
- 1979 NCAA Division I-AA football season
- 1979 NCAA Division II football season
- 1979 NCAA Division III football season
