= Veterans Memorial Stadium (La Crosse) =

Stadium in La Crosse, Wisconsin

Coordinates: 43.81595°N 91.226177°W

Veterans Memorial Field Sports Complex
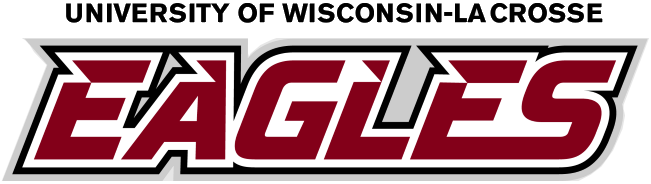

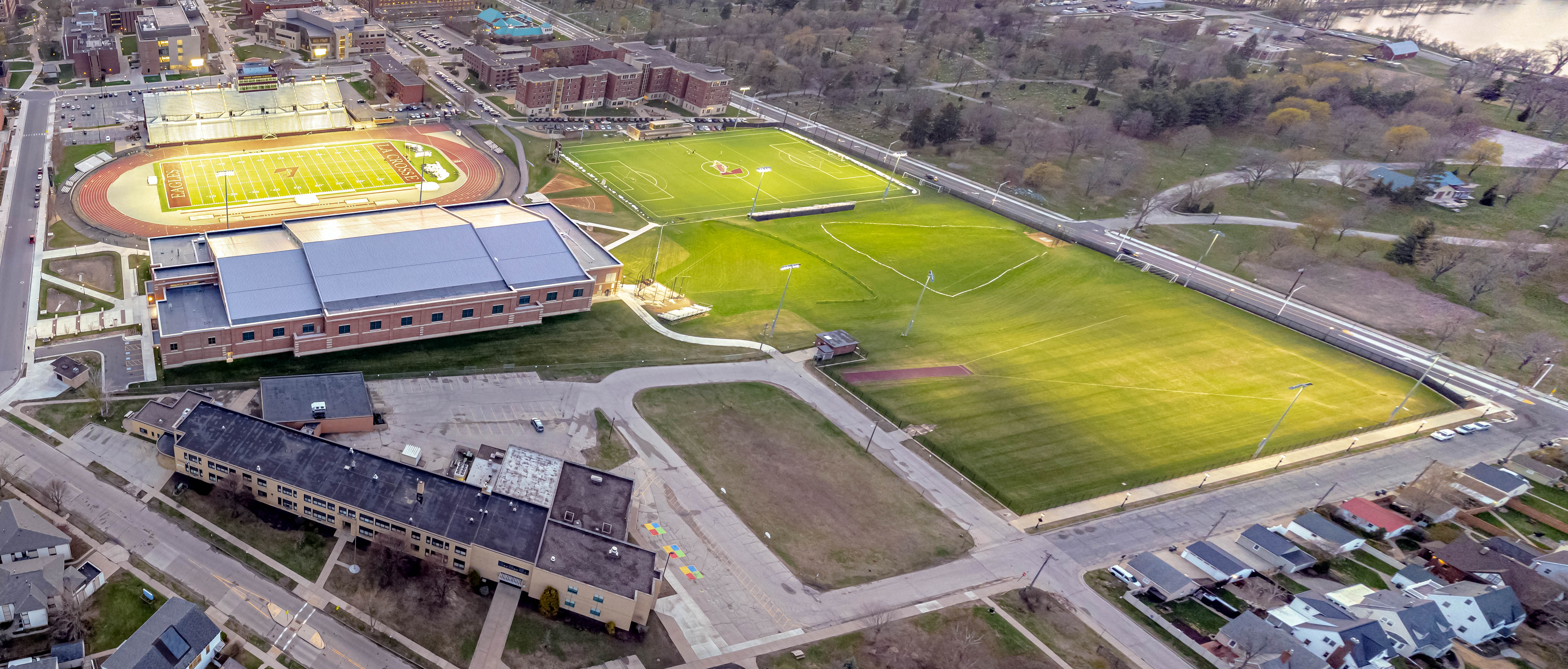
- Aerial view of the complex, with the football/track venue (left) and soccer/lacrosse field (right)
- Interactive map of Veterans Memorial Field Sports Complex
- Full name: Veterans Memorial Field Sports Complex
- Address: La Crosse, Wisconsin; United States
- Owner: University of Wisconsin–La Crosse
- Operator: UWL Athletics
- Capacity: 10,000
- Type: Sports complex
- Surface: Natural Grass
- Current use: Football; Soccer; Lacrosse; Track and field
- Public transit: MTU: 4 Jefferson Lines; Wisconsin Coach Lines

Construction
- Groundbreaking: 2008

Tenants
- Wisconsin–La Crosse Eagles (NCAA): football, lacrosse, soccer, track and field

Website
- uwlathletics.com/veteransmemorialfied

Veterans Memorial Field Sports Complex or Veterans Memorial Stadium is an outdoor stadium and sports complex in La Crosse, Wisconsin on the campus of the University of Wisconsin–La Crosse. As part of a larger sports complex, it is the home field of the UWL Eagles football, soccer, lacrosse, and track & field teams.

The stadium includes a 10-lane, 400 meter track complex and has hosted several NCAA championships in addition to hosting the annual Wisconsin Interscholastic Athletic Association state high school track and field championships each June. The stadium complex also houses the Veterans Hall of Honor.

== History ==
Originally built as Fairground Football Field, the stadium was built and owned by the City of La Crosse. In 1948 it was dedicated and renamed Veterans Memorial Field in honor of veterans from all wars. The University of Wisconsin-La Crosse bought the stadium in 1987 for $1 from the city and later included improvements to the structure and exterior appearances.

== Facilities ==
The complex consists of an American football stadium ("Roger Harring Memorial Stadium") named after Roger Harring, notable coach for the UWL football team who leaded from 1969 to 1999, winning 3 national championships and 15 conference titles at the University. The field is surrounded by an athletics track for the UWL track and field teams.

The other structure is the soccer and lacrosse field, with a seating capacity of 500.

== Rebuild and expansion ==
In 2009, Veterans Memorial Complex was fully rebuilt and expanded to increase stadium seating to around 10,000. The $16 million project included improvements with expanded seating, private suites, a media box, food concessions, restrooms, locker rooms, classrooms, and an indoor Veterans Hall of Honor facility. Additional enhancements to the complex included expanded surrounding athletic fields for soccer and intramural sports.

The expansion supported the university as it sought to attract and retain large events such as the annual WIAA state track meet, while having the necessary fields and associated structures to support both UW–La Crosse athletic and recreational activities as well as community events.

In 2023 UWL opened a $49 million indoor fieldhouse adjacent to the stadium. The 144,000-square-foot facility includes a 200-meter indoor track, locker rooms, training rooms, athletic facilities, and space for offices and team meetings.

== NFL training ==
From 1988-1999 the New Orleans Saints used the stadium facilities for the team's summer training camp. The university is said to be interested in attracting another NFL team to the campus.

== Gallery ==
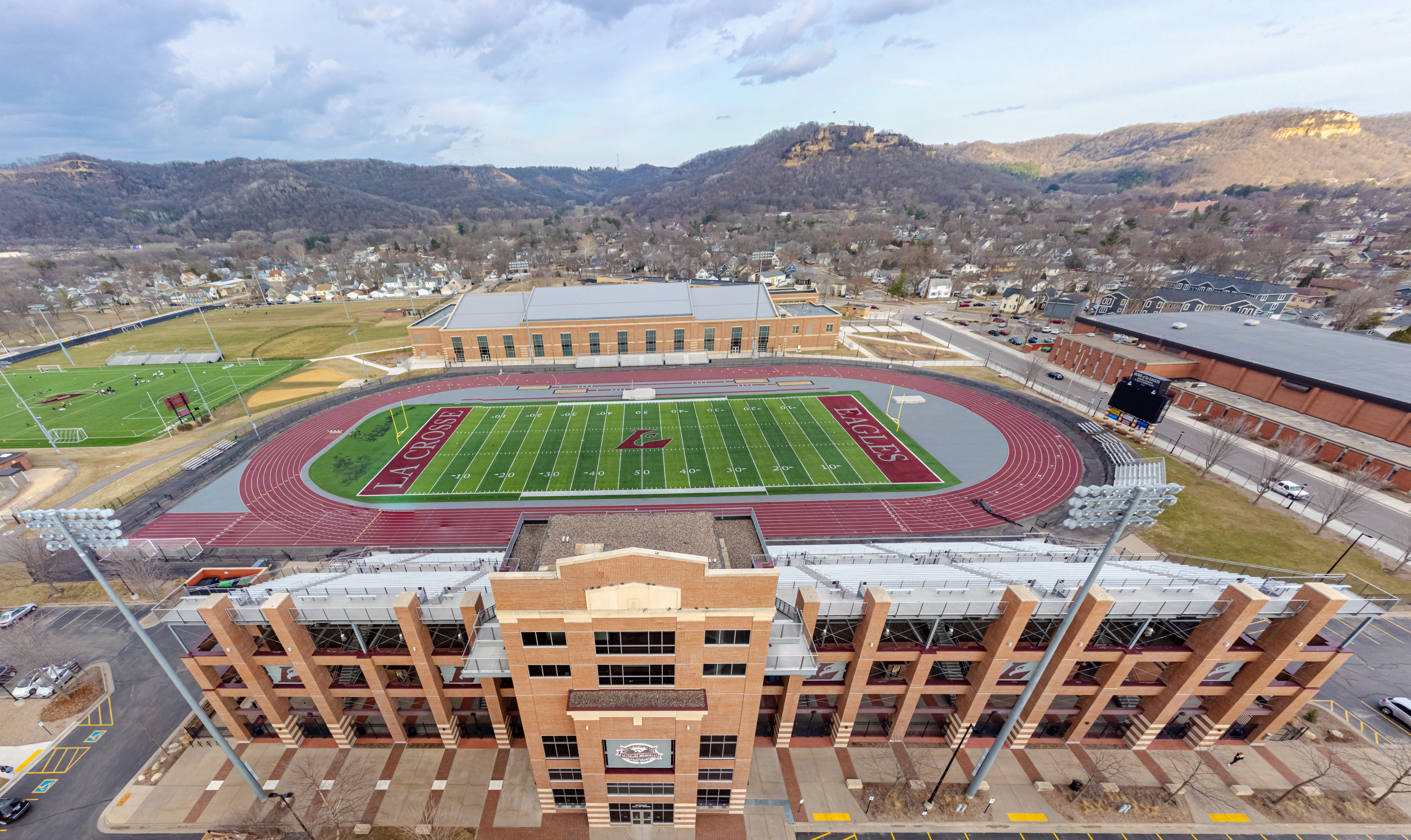
Roger Harring Memorial Stadium

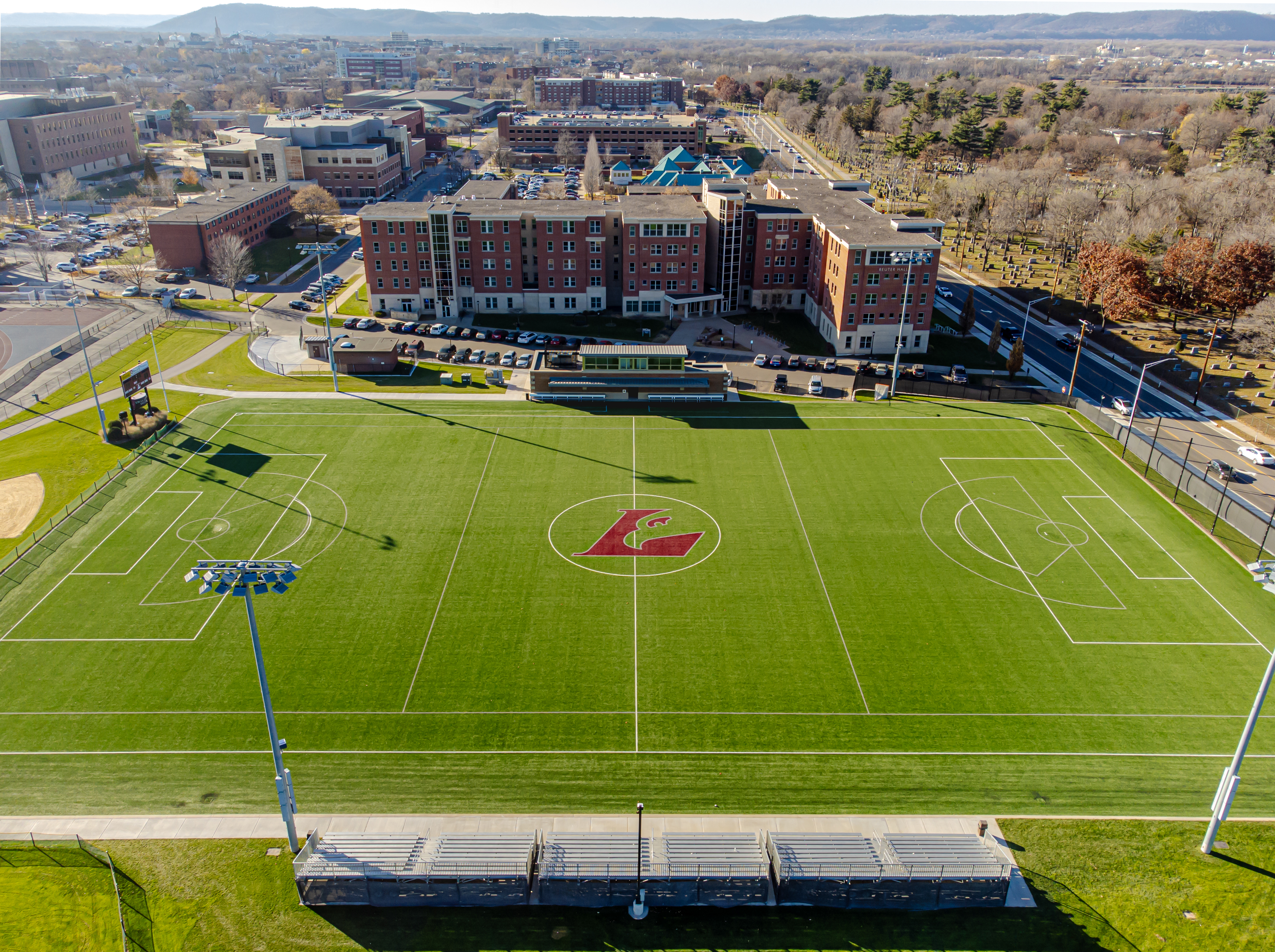
UW-L soccer and lacrosse field

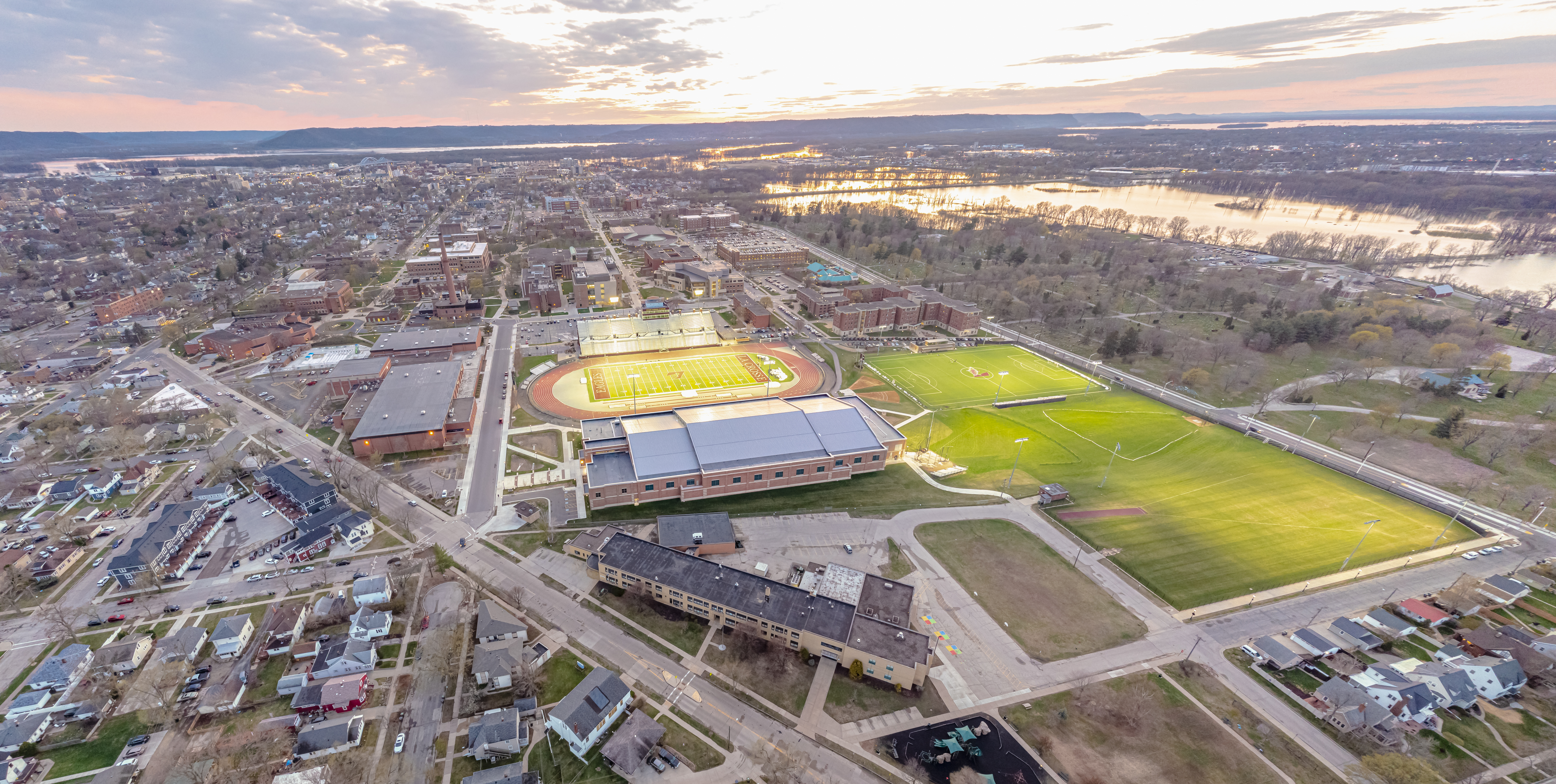
The complex lit up in the evening
