= Wisconsin–La Crosse Eagles football =

American college football team

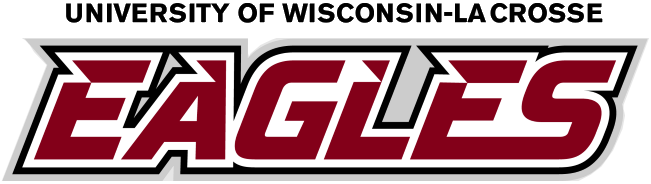
- First season: 1911; 115 years ago
- Head coach: Michael Zweifel; 1st season, 4–6 (.400)
- Location: La Crosse, Wisconsin
- Stadium: Veterans Memorial Stadium (capacity: 10,000)
- NCAA division: Division III
- Conference: WIAC
- Colors: Maroon and gray
- All-time record: 659–334–47 (.656)
- Playoff record: 31–20 (.608)
- Bowl record: 1–0–1 (.750)

NCAA Division III championships
- 1992, 1995

NAIA national championships
- NAIA Division II: 1985

Conference championships
- WIAC: 1917, 1919, 1927, 1933, 1934, 1939, 1940, 1941, 1942, 1949, 1950, 1951, 1952, 1953, 1954, 1971, 1973, 1974, 1975, 1978, 1980, 1982, 1986, 1989, 1991, 1992, 1993, 1995, 1996, 1999, 2002, 2003, 2004, 2022, 2023
- Rivalries: Wisconsin–Whitewater Warhawks; Wisconsin–Eau Claire Blugolds
- Website: uwlathletics.com/football

The Wisconsin–La Crosse Eagles football program is the intercollegiate American football team for the University of Wisconsin–La Crosse located in La Crosse, Wisconsin. Wisconsin–La Crosse competes at the NCAA Division III level and is a member of the Wisconsin Intercollegiate Athletic Conference (WIAC). The Eagles play their home games at Veterans Memorial Stadium. Wisconsin–La Crosse has won three national titles: the NAIA Division II Football National Championship in 1985 and the NCAA Division III Football Championship in 1992 and 1995, all during the tenure of Roger Harring, who served as head coach from 1969 to 1999 and was inducted into the College Football Hall of Fame in 2005.

Wisconsin–La Crosse's teams were known as the Indians from 1937 to 1989. The name was changed because of concerns of racial insensitivity regarding Native Americans; see Native American mascot controversy.

== Head coaching history ==
Wisconsin–La Crosse has had 15 head coaches in their history. No teams were fielded in 1943 or 1944 due to World War II. Additionally, no team was fielded in 2020 due to the COVID-19 pandemic.

Coach	Seasons	Term	Wins	Losses	Ties	Win %	Nat. tit.	Conf. tit.	Playoff app.
Joel Moore	1	1911	3	3	0	.500	0	0	N/A
Fred G. Carter	3	1912–1914	6	11	2	.368	0	0	N/A
Carl Sputh	2	1915–1916	9	4	0	.692	0	0	N/A
Ray Keeler	13	1917–1929	43	25	15	.618	0	3	N/A
Howard Johnson	8	1930–1937	32	17	14	.619	0	2	N/A
Clyde B. Smith	7	1938–1942; 1946–1947	29	16	2	.638	0	4	N/A
Gordon Bahr	1	1945	2	2	0	.500	0	0	N/A
Clark Van Galder	4	1948–1951	31	5	1	.851	0	3	N/A (1 bowl game)
Bill Vickroy	17	1952–1968	86	61	6	.582	0	3	N/A (1 bowl game)
Roger Harring	31	1969–1999	261	75	7	.771	3	15	14
Larry Terry	11	2000–2010	65	48	0	.575	0	3	4
Joel Dettwiler	5	2011–2015	16	34	0	.320	0	0	0
Mike Schmidt	4	2016–2019	27	13	0	.675	0	0	0
Matt Janus	5	2021–2025	45	14	0	.763	0	2	5
Michael Zweifel	1	2026–present	4	6	0	.400	0	0	0

== Championships ==
=== National championship games ===
Wisconsin–La Crosse has played in five national championship games and have won three national championships. The Eagles played in three NAIA Division II Football National Championship games, winning in 1985 and finishing as runners–up in 1988 and 1989. The Eagles have also played in two NCAA Division III Football National Championship games, winning in 1992 and 1995.

Year	Coach	Division	Opponent	Result	Over.
1985	Roger Harring	NAIA Division II	Pacific Lutheran	W 24–7	11–1–2
1988	Roger Harring	NAIA Division II	Westminster (PA)	L 14–21	11–3
1989	Roger Harring	NAIA Division II	Westminster (PA)	L 30–51	12–2
1992	Roger Harring/Roland Christensen*	NCAA Division III	Washington & Jefferson	W 16–12	12–0–1‡
1995	Roger Harring	NCAA Division III	Rowan	W 36–7	14–0

=== Conference championships ===
Wisconsin–La Crosse has won the Wisconsin Intercollegiate Athletic Conference (WIAC) championship 35 times.

Year	Coach	Over.	WIAC
1917	Ray Keeler	4–1	3–0
1919	Ray Keeler	4–2–1	3–0–1
1927	Ray Keeler	5–0–2	4–0–1
1933†	Howard Johnson	3–4–1	2–2–1
1934†	Howard Johnson	5–1–2	3–0–1
1939†	Clyde B. Smith	3–4	3–1
1940†	Clyde B. Smith	6–0	4–0
1941†	Clyde B. Smith	5–1	3–1
1942†	Clyde B. Smith	6–0–1	4–0
1949†	Clark Van Galder	7–2	6–1
1950†	Clark Van Galder	10–0	6–0
1951	Clark Van Galder	7–2	6–0
1952†	Bill Vickroy	8–1	5–0
1953†	Bill Vickroy	9–0–1	5–0
1954	Bill Vickroy	6–2–1	4–0–1
1971†	Roger Harring	8–2	7–1
1973	Roger Harring	9–2	7–1
1974†	Roger Harring	7–3	7–1
1975†	Roger Harring	8–3	7–1
1978†	Roger Harring	9–2	7–1
1980†	Roger Harring	8–2	6–2
1982	Roger Harring	8–2	7–1
1986†	Roger Harring	10–2	7–1
1989	Roger Harring	12–2	7–1
1991	Roger Harring	10–2	7–1
1992	Roger Harring/Roland Christensen*	12–0–1‡	6–0–1‡
1993	Roger Harring	11–1	7–0
1995	Roger Harring	14–0	7–0
1996	Roger Harring	11–2	7–0
1999†	Roger Harring	7–4	6–1
2002	Larry Terry	7–4	6–1
2003	Larry Terry	10–2	6–1
2004	Larry Terry	7–4	5–2
2022†	Matt Janus	9–2	6–1
2023	Matt Janus	11–2	7–0

† Co-champions

=== Undefeated regular seasons ===
Wisconsin–La Crosse has finished the regular season undefeated ten times. Of the undefeated seasons, five (1918, 1927, 1932, 1940, 1942) were before playoffs existed. Two undefeated seasons (1950, 1953) resulted in invitations to the Cigar Bowl. In the playoff era, the Eagles finished the regular season undefeated three times (1992, 1993, 1995), winning the National Championship in 1992 and 1995, and losing in the quarterfinals in 1993.

Year	Coach	Reg. seas.	Final record
1918	Ray Keeler	3–0–1	3–0–1
1927	Ray Keeler	5–0–2	5–0–2
1932	Howard Johnson	5–0–2	5–0–2
1940	Clyde B. Smith	6–0	6–0
1942	Clyde B. Smith	6–0–1	6–0–1
1950	Clark Van Galder	9–0	10–0
1953	Bill Vickroy	9–0	9–0–1
1992	Roger Harring/Roland Christensen*	8–0–1‡	12–0–1‡
1993	Roger Harring	10–0	11–1
1995	Roger Harring	10–0	14–0

‡ The official record book does not reflect the game against the University of Wisconsin–Superior Yellowjackets scheduled for week 4 in 1992. After completing their non-conference schedule, Wisconsin–Superior suspended its season prior to conference play, before eventually dropping the football program altogether. The scheduled game officially went down in the record books as "cancelled" as opposed to a "forfeit". Superior hadn't beaten La Crosse since 1970. The Eagles were looking to extend their 21-game winning streak against the Yellowjackets prior to the cancellation.

* On October 7, 1992, Roger Harring suffered a heart attack that sidelined him for the remainder of the 1992 season. During Coach Harring's recovery, longtime Defensive Coordinator Roland Christensen took over as Interim Head Coach for the rest of the season, including the playoffs.

== Postseason games ==
=== Bowl games ===
Before there were tournaments to crown a national champion, Wisconsin–La Crosse (then La Crosse State) played in the Cigar Bowl twice, winning once and tying once.

Date	Bowl	Coach	Opponent	Result	Record
January 1, 1951	Cigar Bowl	Clark Van Galder	Valparaiso	W 47–14	10–0
January 1, 1954	Cigar Bowl	Bill Vickroy	Missouri Valley	T 12–12	9–0–1

=== NCAA Division III playoffs ===
The Eagles have found much of their post season success at the NCAA Division III level, making the tournament field 16 times, playing in the Stagg Bowl twice (winning both times) and compiling a 21–14 record.

Year	Round	Opponent	Result	Record
1983	Quarterfinals	Occidental	W 43–42	9–3–1
1983	Semifinals	Augustana (IL)	L 15–21	9–3–1
1991	Regionals	Simpson	W 28–13	10–2
1991	Quarterfinals	Saint John's (MN)	L 10–29	10–2
1992	Regionals	Redlands	W 47–26	12–0–1‡
1992	Quarterfinals	Central (IA)	W 34–9	12–0–1‡
1992	Semifinals	Mount Union	W 29–24	12–0–1‡
1992	Championship	Washington & Jefferson	W 16–12	12–0–1‡
1993	Regionals	Wartburg	W 55–26	11–1
1993	Quarterfinals	Saint John's (MN)	L 25–47	11–1
1995	Regionals	Concordia–Moorhead	W 45–7	14–0
1995	Quarterfinals	Wisconsin–River Falls	W 28–14	14–0
1995	Semifinals	Mount Union	W 20–17	14–0
1995	Championship	Rowan	W 36–7	14–0
1996	Regionals	Wisconsin–River Falls	W 44–0	11–2
1996	Quarterfinals	Saint John's (MN)	W 37–30	11–2
1996	Semifinals	Mount Union	L 21–39	11–2
1999	First Round	Central (IA)	L 17–38	7–4
2002	First Round	Coe	L 18–21	7–4
2003	First Round	Concordia Wisconsin	W 52–13	10–2
2003	Second Round	Mount Union	L 14–39	10–2
2004	First Round	St. Norbert	W 37–23	7–4
2004	Second Round	Linfield	L 14–52	7–4
2006	First Round	Bethel (MN)	W 28–21	9–2
2006	Second Round	Wisconsin–Whitewater	L 21–24	9–2
2021	First Round	Albion	W 58–23	9–3
2021	Second Round	North Central (IL)	L 20–34	9–3
2022	First Round	Wartburg	L 6–14	9–2
2023	First Round	Minnesota Morris	W 62–7	11–2
2023	Second Round	Aurora	W 56–35	11–2
2023	Quarterfinals	North Central (IL)	L 42–55	11–2
2024	First Round	Northwestern (MN)	W 59–14	8–4
2024	Second Round	Saint John's (MN)	L 13–24	8–4
2025	Second Round	Hope	W 9–7	8–3
2025	Third Round	North Central (IL)	L 27–35	8–3

=== NAIA Division I playoffs ===
Wisconsin–La Crosse participated in the NAIA Division I playoffs on two occasions, finishing with an 0–2 record.

Year	Round	Opponent	Result	Record
1973	Semifinals	Elon	L 24–35	9–2
1978	Quarterfinals	Grand Valley State	L 14–24	9–2

=== NAIA Division II playoffs ===
Wisconsin–La Crosse was part of the NAIA Division II playoff field five times, reaching the championship game three times and winning the national championship once. In those five appearances they posted a 10–4 record.

Year	Round	Opponent	Result	Record
1985	Quarterfinals	Carroll (MT)	W 24–0	11–1–2
1985	Semifinals	Northwestern (IA)	W 35–28 ^{3OT}	11–1–2
1985	Championship	Pacific Lutheran	W 24–7	11–1–2
1986	Quarterfinals	Hanover	W 35–33	10–2
1986	Semifinals	Baker	L 14–16	10–2
1988	First Round	Valley City State	W 31–6	11–3
1988	Quarterfinals	Northwestern (IA)	W 45–33	11–3
1988	Semifinals	Oregon Tech	W 37–24	11–3
1988	Championship	Westminster (PA)	L 14–21	11–3
1989	First Round	Wisconsin–Stevens Point	W 30–20	12–2
1989	Quarterfinals	Nebraska Weslayan	W 29–0	12–2
1989	Semifinals	Baker	W 21–6	12–2
1989	Championship	Westminster (PA)	L 30–51	12–2
1990	First Round	Peru State	L 3–24	9–2

== Ranked teams ==
Starting in 1999 the American Football Coaches Association (AFCA) began publishing rankings for Division III football. In 2003, D3football.com started publishing its own rankings for Division III football. Since the inception of both polls, Wisconsin–La Crosse has been ranked 11 times in the AFCA Coaches Poll and 9 times in the D3football.com poll to end the season. Additionally, while not being ranked in the Top 25 to end the season, Wisconsin–La Crosse has received votes (RV) in both polls two additional years.

Year	D3	AFCA	Record
1999	N/A	25	7–4
2002	N/A	22	7–4
2003	8	7	10–2
2004	13	16	7–4
2006	6	7	9–2
2017	24	25	8–2
2018	RV	RV	7–3
2019	RV	RV	7–3
2021	11	12	9–3
2022	12	11	9–2
2023	4	4	11–2
2024	21	21	8–4
2025	8	10	8–3

== Border Battle ==
From 1984 to 2000 the Hubert H. Humphrey Metrodome, home to the Minnesota Vikings and Minnesota Golden Gophers, hosted games in November between WIAC team and Northern Sun Intercollegiate Conference (NSIC) team at the NCAA Division II level in what came to be known as the "Border Battle". The Eagles played at the Metrodome three times, and had a 2–1 record, beating Northern State in 2000 after splitting games with Minnesota Duluth in 1996 and 1999.

Date	Opponent	Result
November 17, 1996	Minnesota Duluth	L 3–17
November 13, 1999	Minnesota Duluth	W 22–21
November 11, 2000	Northern State	W 20–14

== Facilities ==
From 1988 to 1999 the university hosted the New Orleans Saints of the National Football League for their preseason training camp. The Saints chose to use La Crosse to escape the extreme heat and humidity of Louisiana summers, as well as the great football facilities. Five other NFL teams used campuses across Wisconsin and Minnesota for training camp, in what was known as the Cheese League.

== Notable former players ==
Notable alumni include:

- Will Berzinski, NFL player
- Roman Brumm, NFL player
- George Dahlgren, NFL player
- Brian Gutekunst, NFL General Manager with the Green Bay Packers, Super Bowl champion (XLV) as a scout
- Roger Harring, high school and college football coach, 3× national champion (1985, 1992, 1995), inducted into the College Football Hall of Fame (inducted in 2005)
- Don Kindt Jr., NFL player
- Craig Kusick, Major League Baseball player
- Craig Kusick Jr., Arena Football League player, Melberger Award winner (1995)
- Ace Loomis, NFL player
- Mike Maslowski, Arena Football League and NFL player
- Ric Mathias, NFL player
- Greg Mattison, high school, college, and NFL football coach, NCAA Division I national champion (2006) defensive coordinator and defensive line coach
- Tom Newberry, NFL player, 2× All-Pro (1988, 1989), 2× Pro Bowl (1989, 1990)
- Mike Schmidt, college football coach
- Bill Schroeder, NFL Europe and NFL player, Super Bowl champion (XXXI)
- Sam Siefkes, college and NFL football coach
- Cole Spieker, Canadian Football League player, Grey Cup champion (2023)
- Jeremy Unertl, Arena Football League, United Football League, Canadian Football League, and NFL Europe player, NFL Europe interceptions leader (2003) and World Bowl XI champion
- Joel Williams, NFL player, 1980 NFC sack leader
- Gary Zauner, college, United Football League and NFL football coach
