= Steve Miller (American football coach) =

Biographical details
- Born: August 26, 1943 (age 83); Jefferson, Iowa, U.S.

Playing career

Football
- 1961–1964: Cornell (IA)
- Position: Quarterback

Coaching career (HC unless noted)

Football
- 1966–1967: Cornell (IA) (OB)
- 1968–1969: Cornell (IA) (DB)
- 1970–1971: Cornell (IA) (DC)
- 1972–1976: Carroll (WI)
- 1977–1979: Morningside
- 1980–1986: Cornell (IA) (assistant)
- 1987–2001: Cornell (IA)

Basketball
- 1982–1983: Cornell (IA)
- 1984–1988: Cornell (IA)

Baseball
- 1967–1973: Cornell (IA)

Head coaching record
- Overall: 121–94–2 (football); 49–61 (basketball)
- Tournaments: Football; 0–1 (NCAA D-III playoffs)

Accomplishments and honors

Championships
- Football; 1 CCIW (1976); 2 MWC (1992, 1995); 4 MWC South Division (1992, 1994–1996)

Awards
- Football; IIAC Coach of the Year (2001)

Stephen C. Miller (August 26, 1943) is an American former football player, coach of football, basketball, and baseball, and college athletics administrator. He served as the head football coach at Carroll College—now known as Carroll University—in Waukesha, Wisconsin from 1972 to 1976, Morningside College in Sioux City, Iowa from 1977 to 1979, and Cornell College in Mount Vernon, Iowa from 1987 to 2001, compiling a career college football record of 121–94–2. Miller was also the head basketball coach at Cornell during the 1982–83 season and again from 1984 to 1988, tallying a mark of 49–61. He was named NCAA Division III coach of the year while coaching football at Cornell.

== Playing career ==
Miller played quarterback at Cornell College from 1961 until 1964 and was awarded all-conference his senior year.

== Coaching career ==
=== Carroll ===
Miller's first head coaching position was as the 23rd head football coach a Carroll College in Waukesha, Wisconsin and he held that position for five seasons, from 1972 until 1976. His career coaching record at Carroll College was 30–15–1.

=== Morningside ===
After coaching at Carroll, Miller became head football coach for the Morningside College in Sioux City, Iowa. He held that position for three seasons, from 1977 until 1979. His coaching record at Morningside was 4–24–1.

=== Cornell ===
Miller moved to Cornell College, in Mount Vernon, Iowa, in 1980 to work as an assistant football coach under Jerry Clark. He succeeded Clark as head football coach in 1987 and served in that capacity until 2001, when he was replaced by Ray Reasland. While at Cornell, he was awarded Division III Coach of the Year, served twice as the school's athletic director, and was head coach of six sports at the school, including basketball. Miller's football teams compiled a record of 87–55, including an undefeated 10–0 season in 1992.

== Later life ==
As of 2009, Miller still works with Cornell in the alumni office as the Associate Director of Development, Major & Planned Gifts.

== Head coaching record ==
=== Football ===
Year	Team	Overall	Conference	Standing	Bowl/playoffs
Carroll Pioneers (College Conference of Illinois and Wisconsin) (1972–1976)
1972	Carroll	6–3	5–3	T–3rd	
1973	Carroll	4–5	3–5	T–4th	
1974	Carroll	6–3	5–3	3rd	
1975	Carroll	6–3	5–3	T–2nd	
1976	Carroll	8–1–1	7–0–1	1st	L NCAA Division III Quarterfinal
Carroll:		30–15–1	25–14–1		
Morningside Chiefs (North Central Conference) (1977–1979)
1977	Morningside	2–6–1	1–5–1	8th	
1978	Morningside	2–8	0–6	7th	
1979	Morningside	0–10	0–6	7th	
Morningside:		4–24–1	1–17–1		
Cornell Rams (Midwest Conference) (1987–1996)
1987	Cornell	5–4	4–3	4th (South)	
1988	Cornell	3–6	3–3	3rd (South)	
1989	Cornell	4–5	3–3	4th (South)	
1990	Cornell	5–4	3–4	3rd (South)	
1991	Cornell	7–2	4–1	2nd (South)	
1992	Cornell	10–0	5–0	1st (South)	
1993	Cornell	7–2	4–1	2nd (South)	
1994	Cornell	6–3	4–1	T–1st (South)	
1995	Cornell	9–1	5–0	T–1st (South)	
1996	Cornell	8–2	4–1	T–1st (South)	
Cornell Rams (Iowa Conference) (1997–2001)
1997	Cornell	6–3	0–0	NA	
1998	Cornell	4–6	4–6	T–7th	
1999	Cornell	3–7	4–7	T–8th	
2000	Cornell	3–7	3–7	T–8th	
2001	Cornell	7–3	6–3	T–3rd	
Cornell:		87–55	56–40		
Total:		121–94–2			
National championship Conference title Conference division title or championship game berth
