= 1992 Charleston Southern Buccaneers football team =

American college football season

1992 Charleston Southern Buccaneers football
- Conference: Independent
- Record: 3–7
- Head coach: David Dowd (2nd season)
- Home stadium: Buccaneer Field

1992 NCAA Division III independents football records
	Conf.			Overall
Team	W	L	T	W		L		T
Dayton ^		–		10	–	1	–	0
Aurora ^		–		9	–	1	–	0
Ithaca ^		–		9	–	2	–	0
Evansville		–		7	–	2	–	0
Saint Peter's		–		7	–	2	–	0
Saint Francis (PA)		–		8	–	2	–	1
Drake		–		7	–	2	–	1
San Diego		–		7	–	2	–	1
Buffalo State ^		–		7	–	3	–	0
UAB		–		7	–	3	–	0
Wesley		–		7	–	3	–	0
Union (NY)		–		6	–	3	–	0
Frostburg State		–		6	–	3	–	1
Gannon		–		6	–	3	–	1
Cortland		–		7	–	4	–	0
Albany		–		6	–	4	–	0
Duquesne		–		5	–	4	–	0
Mercyhurst		–		5	–	4	–	1
Davidson		–		5	–	5	–	0
Maryville (TN)		–		5	–	5	–	0
Fairleigh Dickinson–Florham		–		4	–	5	–	0
Ferrum		–		4	–	5	–	0
Alfred		–		4	–	6	–	0
Buffalo		–		4	–	6	–	0
Catholic University		–		4	–	6	–	0
Georgetown		–		4	–	6	–	0
Hofstra		–		4	–	6	–	0
Canisius		–		3	–	6	–	1
Colorado College		–		3	–	6	–	0
Menlo		–		3	–	6	–	0
St. Lawrence		–		3	–	6	–	0
Brockport		–		3	–	7	–	0
Charleston Southern		–		3	–	7	–	0
Kentucky Wesleyan		–		3	–	7	–	0
Salisbury State		–		2	–	7	–	0
Siena		–		2	–	7	–	0
Hartwick		–		1	–	7	–	0
Methodist		–		0	–	10	–	0
^ – NCAA Division III playoff participant

The 1992 Charleston Southern Buccaneers football team represented Charleston Southern University as an independent during the 1992 NCAA Division III football season. Led by second-year head coach David Dowd, the Buccaneers compiled a record of 3–7. Charleston Southern played home games at Buccaneer Field in North Charleston, South Carolina. Charleston Southern moved to the NCAA Division I-AA—now known as NCAA Division I Football Championship Subdivision (FCS)—level in 1993.

== Schedule ==
Date	Opponent	Site	Result	Attendance	Source
September 5	Methodist	Buccaneer Field; North Charleston, SC	W 20–19	850	
September 12	at Gardner–Webb	Ernest W. Spangler Stadium; Boiling Springs, NC	L 0–56	2,134	
September 19	Apprentice	Buccaneer Field; North Charleston, SC	L 7–28	500	
September 26	Guilford	Buccaneer Field; North Charleston, SC	W 37–13	900	
October 3	Newberry	Buccaneer Field; North Charleston, SC	L 12–28	1,500	
October 10	at East Tennessee State	Memorial Center; Johnson City, TN	L 0–62	6,511	
October 17	at UAB	Legion Field; Birmingham, AL	L 7–39	4,922	
October 24	at Davidson	Richardson Stadium; Davidson, NC	L 27–32	661	
October 31	at The Citadel JV	Johnson Hagood Stadium; Charleston, SC	W 35–33	1,500	
November 14	vs. South Carolina State	Summerville High School; Summerville, SC	L 0–32	8,500	
