= Bob Berezowitz =

American football player and coach (born 1944)

Biographical details
- Born: July 8, 1944 (age 82)

Playing career
- 1963–1966: Whitewater State
- Position: Quarterback

Coaching career (HC unless noted)
- 1967: Wisconsin–Whitewater (SA)
- 1981: Wisconsin–Whitewater (OC)
- 1985–2006: Wisconsin–Whitewater

Head coaching record
- Overall: 158–73–4
- Tournaments: 9–5 (NCAA D-III playoffs)

Accomplishments and honors

Championships
- 8× WIAC (1987–1988, 1990, 1994, 1997–1998, 2005–2006)

Awards
- As a player: Second-team Little All-American (1966); As a coach: 4× WIAC Football Coach of the Year (1987–1988, 1990, 1994, 1997, 2005); 2× Wisconsin College Coach of the Year (1997, 2005); 3× American Football Coaches Association Regional Coach of the Year (1988, 1990, 2005); AFCA NCAA Division III COY (2005); Wisconsin Football Coaches Association (WFCA) Hall of Fame (inducted in 1998)

Bob Berezowitz (born July 8, 1944) is an American former football player and coach. From 1963 to 1966, he was the catcher for the Wisconsin–Whitewater Warhawks baseball team and the quarterback for the Wisconsin–Whitewater Warhawks football team. From 1985 to 2006, he served as the head coach for the Wisconsin–Whitewater Warhawks football team. During his tenure as head coach, he amassed a record of 158–73–4, with eight conference championships, four NCAA playoff appearances (1988, 1990, 1994, and 2005), and two championship game appearances. He has been inducted into the UW–Whitewater Athletics Hall of Fame, National Association of Intercollegiate Athletics District 14 Hall of Fame, and the Wisconsin Football Coaches Association Hall of Fame. In September 2012, UW–Whitewater renamed the student athletic complex after Berezowitz.

== Head coaching record ==
Year	Team	Overall	Conference	Standing	Bowl/playoffs
Wisconsin–Whitewater Warhawks (Wisconsin Intercollegiate Athletic Conference) (1985–2006)
1985	Wisconsin–Whitewater	3–7–1	3–4–1	T–5th	
1986	Wisconsin–Whitewater	6–4–1	4–3–1	4th	
1987	Wisconsin–Whitewater	7–3–1	6–2	T–1st	
1988	Wisconsin–Whitewater	9–3	7–1	1st	L NCAA Division III Quarterfinal
1989	Wisconsin–Whitewater	4–5–1	2–5–1	6th	
1990	Wisconsin–Whitewater	10–1	8–0	1st	L NCAA Division III First Round
1991	Wisconsin–Whitewater	6–4	6–2	2nd	
1992	Wisconsin–Whitewater	8–2	5–2	2nd	
1993	Wisconsin–Whitewater	6–4	5–2	3rd	
1994	Wisconsin–Whitewater	8–2	6–1	1st	
1995	Wisconsin–Whitewater	7–3	4–3	4th	
1996	Wisconsin–Whitewater	8–2	5–2	3rd	
1997	Wisconsin–Whitewater	9–1	7–0	1st	L NCAA Division III First Round
1998	Wisconsin–Whitewater	7–2	5–2	T–1st	
1999	Wisconsin–Whitewater	3–7	3–4	T–4th	
2000	Wisconsin–Whitewater	5–5	3–4	5th	
2001	Wisconsin–Whitewater	5–5	2–5	7th	
2002	Wisconsin–Whitewater	5–5	4–3	3rd	
2003	Wisconsin–Whitewater	7–3	5–2	2nd	
2004	Wisconsin–Whitewater	7–3	4–3	T–2nd	
2005	Wisconsin–Whitewater	14–1	7–0	1st	L NCAA Division III Championship
2006	Wisconsin–Whitewater	14–1	7–0	1st	L NCAA Division III Championship
Wisconsin–Whitewater:		158–73–4			
Total:		158–73–4			
National championship Conference title Conference division title or championship game berth
