= 1992 Buffalo Bulls football team =

American college football season

1992 Buffalo Bulls football
- Conference: Independent
- Record: 4–6
- Head coach: Jim Ward (1st season)
- Captains: Eric Polanski; Bill Stonecypher
- Home stadium: Rotary Field

1992 NCAA Division III independents football records
| | Conf. | | | Overall |
| Team | W | L | T | W | | L | | T |
|---|---|---|---|---|---|---|---|---|
| Dayton ^ | | – | | 10 | – | 1 | – | 0 |
| Aurora ^ | | – | | 9 | – | 1 | – | 0 |
| Ithaca ^ | | – | | 9 | – | 2 | – | 0 |
| Evansville | | – | | 7 | – | 2 | – | 0 |
| Saint Peter's | | – | | 7 | – | 2 | – | 0 |
| Saint Francis (PA) | | – | | 8 | – | 2 | – | 1 |
| Drake | | – | | 7 | – | 2 | – | 1 |
| San Diego | | – | | 7 | – | 2 | – | 1 |
| Buffalo State ^ | | – | | 7 | – | 3 | – | 0 |
| UAB | | – | | 7 | – | 3 | – | 0 |
| Wesley | | – | | 7 | – | 3 | – | 0 |
| Union (NY) | | – | | 6 | – | 3 | – | 0 |
| Frostburg State | | – | | 6 | – | 3 | – | 1 |
| Gannon | | – | | 6 | – | 3 | – | 1 |
| Cortland | | – | | 7 | – | 4 | – | 0 |
| Albany | | – | | 6 | – | 4 | – | 0 |
| Duquesne | | – | | 5 | – | 4 | – | 0 |
| Mercyhurst | | – | | 5 | – | 4 | – | 1 |
| Davidson | | – | | 5 | – | 5 | – | 0 |
| Maryville (TN) | | – | | 5 | – | 5 | – | 0 |
| Fairleigh Dickinson–Florham | | – | | 4 | – | 5 | – | 0 |
| Ferrum | | – | | 4 | – | 5 | – | 0 |
| Alfred | | – | | 4 | – | 6 | – | 0 |
| Buffalo | | – | | 4 | – | 6 | – | 0 |
| Catholic University | | – | | 4 | – | 6 | – | 0 |
| Georgetown | | – | | 4 | – | 6 | – | 0 |
| Hofstra | | – | | 4 | – | 6 | – | 0 |
| Canisius | | – | | 3 | – | 6 | – | 1 |
| Colorado College | | – | | 3 | – | 6 | – | 0 |
| Menlo | | – | | 3 | – | 6 | – | 0 |
| St. Lawrence | | – | | 3 | – | 6 | – | 0 |
| Brockport | | – | | 3 | – | 7 | – | 0 |
| Charleston Southern | | – | | 3 | – | 7 | – | 0 |
| Kentucky Wesleyan | | – | | 3 | – | 7 | – | 0 |
| Salisbury State | | – | | 2 | – | 7 | – | 0 |
| Siena | | – | | 2 | – | 7 | – | 0 |
| Hartwick | | – | | 1 | – | 7 | – | 0 |
| Methodist | | – | | 0 | – | 10 | – | 0 |
^ – NCAA Division III playoff participant

The 1992 Buffalo Bulls football team represented the University at Buffalo as an independent during the 1992 NCAA Division III football season. Led by Jim Ward in his first season as head coach, the team compiled a record of 4–6.

== Schedule ==
| Date | Opponent | Site | Result | Attendance | Source |
|---|---|---|---|---|---|
| September 5 | at Edinboro | Edinboro, PA | L 13–35 | 3,834 | |
| September 12 | at New Haven | West Haven, CT | L 48–69 | 1,128 | |
| September 19 | at Lafayette | Fisher Field; Easton, PA | L 28–49 | 6,823 | |
| September 26 | Mansfield | Rotary Field; Buffalo, NY | W 56–42 | 2,421 | |
| October 3 | Morgan State | Rotary Field; Buffalo, NY | L 27–45 | 3,104 | |
| October 10 | at Colgate | Andy Kerr Stadium; Hamilton, NY | L 21–35 | 4,950 | |
| October 17 | at Buffalo State | Coyer Field; Buffalo, NY | W 19–15 | 3,763 | |
| October 24 | Hofstra | Rotary Field; Buffalo, NY | W 26–15 | 3,512 | |
| October 31 | at Central Connecticut | New Britain, CT | W 60–27 | 450 | |
| November 7 | at UCF | Citrus Bowl; Orlando, FL | L 21–63 | 9,067 | |
