= List of UAB Blazers head football coaches =

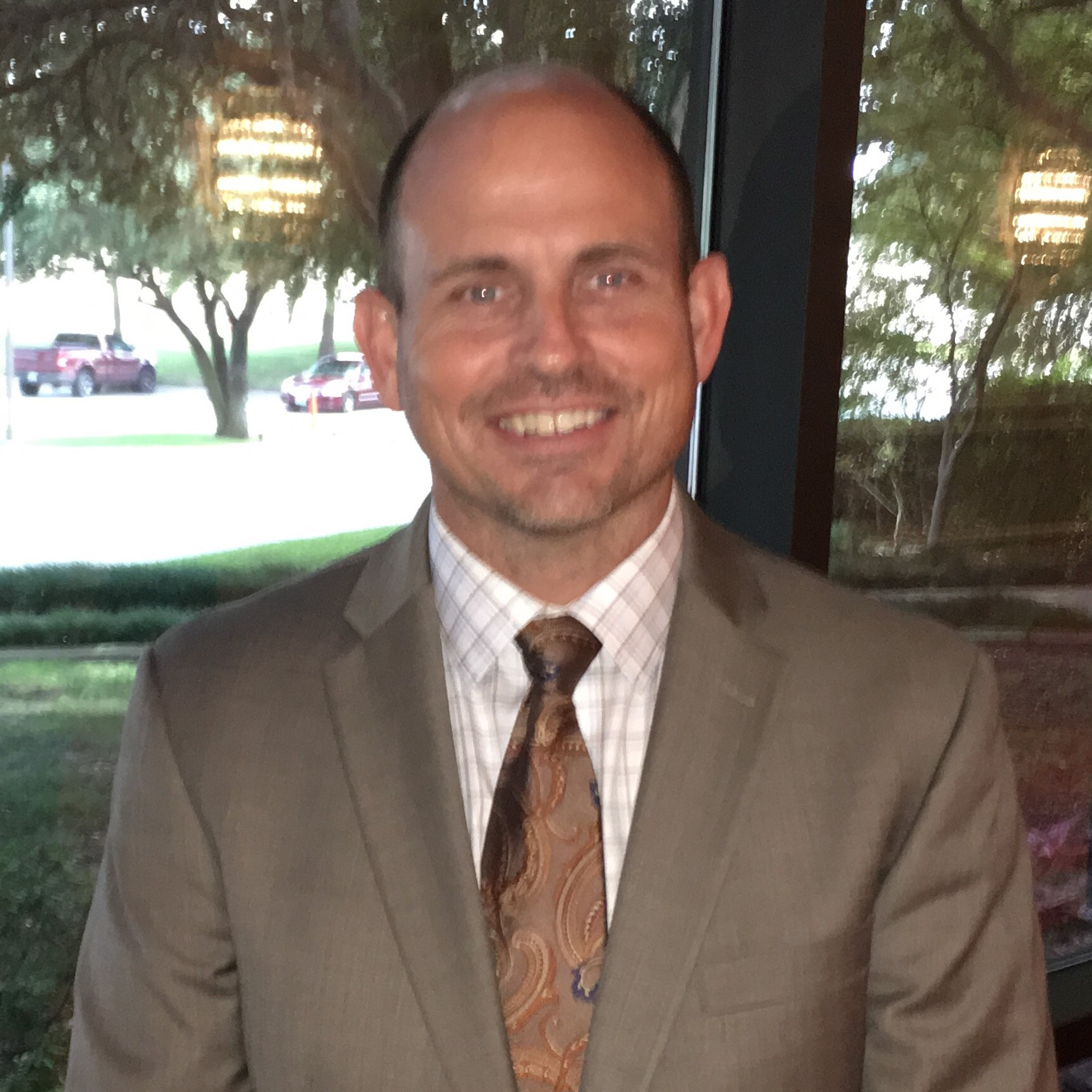
Bill Clark led the Blazers to a pair of Conference USA championships during his tenure as head coach.

The UAB Blazers football team represents the University of Alabama at Birmingham in the American Athletic Conference (AAC), competing as part of the National Collegiate Athletic Association (NCAA) Division I Football Bowl Subdivision (FBS). The program has had six head coaches and two interim coaches during its existence, as well as one stint with no coach while the program was on hiatus. The program began in the 1991 season and spent two years as an NCAA Division III independent before transferring to Division II. After just three years in Division II, the school entered Division I-A, now known as the Football Bowl Subdivision (FBS). Trent Dilfer was fired as head coach of the Blazers after he led UAB to a 2–6 record to start the 2025 season, and Alex Mortensen named interim head coach for the remainder of the season.

The school adopted the nickname "Blazers" for its sports programs in 1978, in preparation for the basketball program's inaugural season. The nickname was selected over the options of Barons, Warriors, or Titans. After two different mascots, the nickname became representative of Blaze the Dragon, the school's mascot since the 1995 season. The Blazers have played in 286 games over twenty-seven seasons. Watson Brown led the team to its first postseason game, the 2004 Hawaii Bowl. The Blazers have appeared in three other bowl games since then under Bill Clark, who led them to the program's first bowl victory in 2018. Clark also led the Blazers to Conference USA championships in both 2018 and 2020, and is the only UAB coach to have won a conference championship.

Jim Hilyer, the program's first coach, is the all-time leader in win percentage, at .683 with a record of 27–12–2. Garrick McGee has the lowest win percentage, at just .208 with a record of 5–19. Watson Brown served the longest time as head coach at twelve years, and leads in number of games coached (136), number of games won (62), and number of games lost (74). Garrick McGee served the shortest time of all coaches, at two years, and McGee coached the fewest games (24). Among conference play, Clark leads in conference win percentage at 0.727. Brown leads in conference games played (59) and conference games lost (29).

== Key ==
Key to symbols in coaches list
General		Overall		Conference		Postseason (Note: Although the first Rose Bowl Game was played in 1902, it has been continuously played since the 1916 game, and is recognized as the oldest bowl game by the NCAA. "—" indicates any season prior to 1916 when postseason games were not played.)	
No.	Order of coaches (Note: A running total of the number of head coaches, with coaches who served separate tenures being counted only once. Interim head coaches are represented with "Int" and are not counted in the running total. "—" indicates the team played but either without a coach or no coach is on record. "X" indicates an interim year without play.)	GC	Games coached	CW	Conference wins	PW	Postseason wins
DC	Division championships	OW	Overall wins	CL	Conference losses	PL	Postseason losses
CC	Conference championships	OL	Overall losses	CT	Conference ties	PT	Postseason ties
NC	National championships	OT	Overall ties (Note: Overtime rules in college football were introduced in 1996, making ties impossible in the period since.)	C%	Conference winning percentage		
†	Elected to the College Football Hall of Fame	O%	Overall winning percentage (Note: When computing the win–loss percentage, a tie counts as half a win and half a loss.)				

== Coaches ==
List of head football coaches showing season(s) coached, overall records, conference records (Note: UAB has been a member of Conference USA since the 1999 season. Prior to then, they competed as an independent.), postseason records, championships and selected awards (Note: Statistics correct as of the end of the 2025 NCAA Division I FBS football season.)
No.	Name	Season(s)	GC	OW	OL	OT	O%	CW	CL	CT	C%	PW	PL	PT	DCs	CCs	NCs	Awards
1	Jim Hilyer	1991–94	41	27	12	2	0.683	—	—	—	—	0	0	0	—	—	0	—
2	Watson Brown	1995–2006	136	62	74	0	0.456	30	29	0	0.508	0	1	0	0	0	0	—
3	Neil Callaway	2007–11	60	18	42	—	0.300	14	26	—	0.350	0	0	—	0	0	0	—
4	Garrick McGee	2012–13	24	5	19	—	0.208	3	13	—	0.188	0	0	—	0	0	0	—
5	Bill Clark	2014, 2017–2021	75	49	26	—	0.653	32	12	—	0.727	2	2	—	3	2	0	Conference USA Coach of the Year (2014, 2017)CBS Sports National Coach of the Year (2017)
X	No team (Note: UAB did not field a team during the 2015 or 2016 seasons due to shuttering of the program.)	2015–16	—	—	—	—	—	—	—	—	—	—	—	—	—	—	—	—
5	Bill Clark	2014, 2017–2021	75	49	26	—	0.653	32	12	—	0.727	2	2	—	3	2	0	Conference USA Coach of the Year (2014, 2017)CBS Sports National Coach of the Year (2017)
Int.	Bryant Vincent	2022	12	6	6	—	0.500	4	4	—	0.500	—	—	—	—	—	—	—
6	Trent Dilfer	2023—2025	30	9	21	—	0.300	5	14	—	0.263	—	—	—	—	—	—	—
7	Alex Mortensen	2025–present	6	2	4	—	0.333	2	3	—	0.400	—	—	—	—	—	—	—
