= 1992 UAB Blazers football team =

American college football season

1992 UAB Blazers football
- Conference: Independent
- Record: 7–3
- Head coach: Jim Hilyer (2nd season)
- Offensive scheme: Multiple
- Base defense: 3–4
- Home stadium: Legion Field, Lawson Field

1992 NCAA Division III independents football records
	Conf.			Overall
Team	W	L	T	W		L		T
Dayton ^		–		10	–	1	–	0
Aurora ^		–		9	–	1	–	0
Ithaca ^		–		9	–	2	–	0
Evansville		–		7	–	2	–	0
Saint Peter's		–		7	–	2	–	0
Saint Francis (PA)		–		8	–	2	–	1
Drake		–		7	–	2	–	1
San Diego		–		7	–	2	–	1
Buffalo State ^		–		7	–	3	–	0
UAB		–		7	–	3	–	0
Wesley		–		7	–	3	–	0
Union (NY)		–		6	–	3	–	0
Frostburg State		–		6	–	3	–	1
Gannon		–		6	–	3	–	1
Cortland		–		7	–	4	–	0
Albany		–		6	–	4	–	0
Duquesne		–		5	–	4	–	0
Mercyhurst		–		5	–	4	–	1
Davidson		–		5	–	5	–	0
Maryville (TN)		–		5	–	5	–	0
Fairleigh Dickinson–Florham		–		4	–	5	–	0
Ferrum		–		4	–	5	–	0
Alfred		–		4	–	6	–	0
Buffalo		–		4	–	6	–	0
Catholic University		–		4	–	6	–	0
Georgetown		–		4	–	6	–	0
Hofstra		–		4	–	6	–	0
Canisius		–		3	–	6	–	1
Colorado College		–		3	–	6	–	0
Menlo		–		3	–	6	–	0
St. Lawrence		–		3	–	6	–	0
Brockport		–		3	–	7	–	0
Charleston Southern		–		3	–	7	–	0
Kentucky Wesleyan		–		3	–	7	–	0
Salisbury State		–		2	–	7	–	0
Siena		–		2	–	7	–	0
Hartwick		–		1	–	7	–	0
Methodist		–		0	–	10	–	0
^ – NCAA Division III playoff participant

The 1992 UAB Blazers football team represented the University of Alabama at Birmingham (UAB) as an independent during the 1992 NCAA Division III football season. It was the second team fielded by the school. Led by second-year head coach Jim Hilyer, the Blazers compiled a record of 7–3. They played four of their home games at Legion Field in and one at Lawson Field, both located in Birmingham, Alabama. UAB moved to the NCAA Division I-AA—now known as NCAA Division I Football Championship Subdivision (FCS)—level in 1993.

== Schedule ==
Date	Opponent	Site	Result	Attendance	Source
September 5	Millsaps	Legion Field; Birmingham, AL	W 28–0	5,719	
September 12	Gallaudet	Lawson Field; Birmingham, AL	W 44–6	5,349	
September 19	Lane	Legion Field; Birmingham, AL	W 26–6	5,977	
September 26	at Tennessee Wesleyan	Memorial Stadium; Athens, TN	L 12–16	1,000	
October 3	Miles	Legion Field; Birmingham, AL	W 30–6	7,042	
October 17	Charleston Southern	Legion Field; Birmingham, AL	W 39–7	4,922	
October 24	at Ferrum	W. B. Adams Stadium; Ferrum, VA	L 17–31	3,000	
October 31	at Samford	Seibert Stadium; Homewood, AL	L 3–49	6,156	
November 7	at Lindenwood	Harlen C. Hunter Stadium; St. Charles, MO	W 41–12	700	
November 14	at Clinch Valley	Carl Smith Stadium; Wise, VA	W 41–30	2,000	
