= Mike Kelly (American football coach, born 1948) =

American football player and coach (born 1948)

Biographical details
- Born: January 26, 1948 (age 78)
- Education: Manchester (IN)

Coaching career (HC unless noted)
- 1975–1976: Hanover (assistant)
- 1977–1980: Dayton (DC)
- 1981–2007: Dayton

Head coaching record
- Overall: 246–54–1
- Tournaments: 13–8 (NCAA D-III playoffs)

Accomplishments and honors

Championships
- 1 NCAA Division III (1989); 8 PFL (1993–1993, 1996–1997, 1999–2002, 2007)
- College Football Hall of Fame; Inducted in 2011 (profile)

Mike Kelly (born January 26, 1948) is an American former football coach. He was the head football coach at the University of Dayton from 1981 to 2007. In 27 years as the head coach at Dayton, he compiled a record of 246–54–1. He led the Dayton Flyers to the NCAA Division III Football Championship in 1989 and appearances in the title game three other times, in 1981, 1987, and 1991. Kelly ranks among the top 25 college football coaches of all time in winning percentage (.819). Among coaches with at least 25 years of experience, he has the fifth best winning percentage of all time.

== Biography ==
Kelly is a graduate of Milton-Union High School in West Milton, Ohio, and Manchester University in North Manchester, Indiana. He played both quarterback for the football team and catcher for the baseball team at Manchester University. He received a bachelor's degree in physical education and health from Manchester University.

Kelly began his coaching career as a high school football coach. He coached at the high school level from 1970 to 1974 while earning a master's degree in physical education from Ball State University. From 1975 to 1976, he was an assistant coach at Hanover College in Hanover, Indiana. He joined the coaching staff at the University of Dayton in 1977 as the defensive coordinator under head coach Rick Carter.

After four years as the defensive coordinator, Kelly took over as head coach of the Dayton Flyers football team in 1981. He later recalled the day he learned that he had been selected: "The day I was informed that I would be the head football coach, I remember walking out of St. Mary's Hall and looking up at the chapel, and it was overwhelming to think that, golly, I'm the new head football coach at the University of Dayton."

Kelly remained Dayton's head football coach for 27 years and compiled a record of 246–54–1. Kelly is among the top 25 college football coaches of all time in terms of both winning percentage and wins. As of 2008, he ranked 21st among all college football coaches in all divisions with an .819 winning percentage over 27 seasons. Among coaches with at least 25 years of experience, Kelly's winning percentage of .819 ranks fourth best all time, trailing only Florida A&M's Jake Gaither (.844), Nebraska's Tom Osborne (.836) and Michigan's Fielding H. Yost (.828).

In total wins, Kelly ranks 20th all time with 246. He was the second fastest coach in NCAA history to reach 200 wins. Kelly accomplished the feat in 242 games—second only to Jake Gaither who reached the 200-win level in 240 games.

He led Dayton to three national championships—the NCAA Division III national championship in 1989 and NCAA Mid-Major national championships in 2002 and 2007. In 2007, Kelly's last as head coach, his team compiled an 11-1 record, won the Gridiron Classic and was crowned NCAA FCS Mid-Major national champions. He coached 44 Academic All-Americans and 84 first team All-Americans in his 27 years as Dayton's head coach.

Kelly was frequently considered for coaching positions at larger schools, including Yale, Dartmouth, Columbia, and Penn, but opted to stay at Dayton. In 1996, he described his motivation for staying at Dayton, "There is a very basic reason why I haven't put a great deal of effort in other jobs. I just love it here. I think we're accepted and respected in the community. Those things are all very valuable in your life. You want to feel wanted - that's pretty basic, I think - and we've always felt that." He also noted that he enjoyed working with non-scholarship athletes who were playing for the love of the game: "It's a blast. It's a lot of fun to deal with those kind of people. They want to have fun, and they're gonna work hard, but every one of them is out there because they want to be. I look forward to going to practice. They're wide-eyed. (They're saying) 'Teach me something coach.'"

Kelly was selected six times as the Coach of the Year in the Pioneer Football League and was honored seven times as the national Coach of the Year. Dayton played in NCAA Division III for Kelly's first 12 seasons as head coach and went to the Division III playoffs eight times. For his last 15 seasons, Dayton played in the NCAA Division I-AA non-scholarship division.

Kelly was inducted into the University of Dayton Athletic Hall of Fame in February 2008.

On July 16, 2011, Coach Kelly was inducted into the National Football Foundation’s College Football Hall of Fame. The ceremony was co-hosted by one of Coach Kelly's former players and former Super Bowl Champion head coach, Jon Gruden.

He is married to Jeanne Kelly, and they have two daughters, Jodie Beth and Nikki.

== Head coaching record ==
Year	Team	Overall	Conference	Standing	Bowl/playoffs	TSN^{#}
Dayton Flyers (NCAA Division III independent) (1981–1992)
1981	Dayton	12–2			L NCAA Division III Football Championship	
1982	Dayton	6–4				
1983	Dayton	7–3				
1984	Dayton	10–1			L NCAA Division III First Round	
1985	Dayton	7–3				
1986	Dayton	10–1			L NCAA Division III First Round	
1987	Dayton	11–3			L NCAA Division III Football Championship	
1988	Dayton	9–2			L NCAA Division III First Round	
1989	Dayton	13–0–1			W NCAA Division III Football Championship	
1990	Dayton	11–1			L NCAA Division III Second Round	
1991	Dayton	13–1			L NCAA Division III Football Championship	
1992	Dayton	10–1			L NCAA Division III First Round	
Dayton Flyers (Pioneer Football League) (1993–2007)
1993	Dayton	9–1	5–0	1st		
1994	Dayton	8–2	4–1	T–1st		
1995	Dayton	9–2	4–1	2nd		
1996	Dayton	11–0	5–0	1st		24
1997	Dayton	9–1	5–0	1st		23
1998	Dayton	6–4	3–1	2nd		
1999	Dayton	6–4	4–0	1st		
2000	Dayton	8–3	3–1	T–1st		
2001	Dayton	10–1	4–0	1st (North)	W PFL Championship Game	
2002	Dayton	11–1	4–0	1st (North)	W PFL Championship Game	
2003	Dayton	9–2	2–2	3rd (North)		
2004	Dayton	7–3	2–2	3rd (North)		
2005	Dayton	9–1	3–1	2nd (North)		
2006	Dayton	4–6	1–6	T–7th		
2007	Dayton	11–1	6–1	T–1st	W Gridiron Classic	
Total:		246–54–1				
National championship Conference title Conference division title or championship game berth

== See also ==
- List of college football career coaching wins leaders
