= 1991 NAIA Division II football season =

American college football season

- Regular season: August–November 1991
- Postseason: November–December 1991
- National Championship: Georgetown, KY
- Champions: Georgetown (KY)

The 1991 NAIA Division II football season, as part of the 1991 college football season in the United States and the 36th season of college football sponsored by the NAIA, was the 22nd season of play of the NAIA's division II for football.

The season was played from August to November 1991 and culminated in the 1991 NAIA Division II Football National Championship, played in Georgetown, Kentucky on the campus of Georgetown College.

The Georgetown Tigers defeated the Pacific Lutheran Lutes in the championship game, 28–20, to win their first NAIA national title.

== Conference standings ==
1991 Columbia Football Association standings
	Conf.					Overall
Team	W		L		T	W		L		T
Mount Hood League
No. 12 Lewis & Clark x^	5	–	1	–	0	7	–	2	–	1
No. 9 Linfield x^	5	–	1	–	0	8	–	3	–	0
No. 25 Southern Oregon	4	–	2	–	0	5	–	3	–	1
Oregon Tech	3	–	3	–	0	3	–	6	–	0
Eastern Oregon	2	–	4	–	0	4	–	5	–	0
Willamette	2	–	4	–	0	4	–	5	–	0
Western Oregon	0	–	6	–	0	0	–	9	–	0
Mount Rainier League
No. 1 Central Washington x^	6	–	0	–	0	9	–	1	–	0
No. 4 Pacific Lutheran ^	5	–	1	–	0	11	–	2	–	0
Western Washington	4	–	2	–	0	5	–	3	–	1
Simon Fraser	2	–	4	–	0	4	–	6	–	0
Puget Sound	2	–	4	–	0	3	–	5	–	1
Whitworth	2	–	4	–	0	3	–	6	–	0
Pacific (OR)	0	–	6	–	0	0	–	9	–	0
x – League champion/co-champions ^ – NAIA Division II playoff participant; Rankings from NAIA Division II poll

1991 Frontier Conference football standings
	Conf.					Overall
Team	W		L		T	W		L		T
Rocky Mountain $	4	–	2	–	0	5	–	5	–	0
Carroll (MT)	3	–	3	–	0	5	–	4	–	0
Montana Tech	3	–	3	–	0	5	–	4	–	0
Western Montana	2	–	4	–	0	3	–	5	–	0
$ – Conference champion

1991 Heart of America Athletic Conference football standings
	Conf.					Overall
Team	W		L		T	W		L		T
No. 19 Baker +	5	–	1	–	0	6	–	2	–	1
No. 24 William Jewell +	5	–	1	–	0	6	–	3	–	0
Missouri Valley	4	–	2	–	0	4	–	6	–	0
Evangel	3	–	3	–	0	6	–	4	–	0
Graceland	2	–	4	–	0	5	–	4	–	0
Culver–Stockton	2	–	4	–	0	3	–	7	–	0
MidAmerica Nazarene	0	–	6	–	0	0	–	10	–	0
+ – Conference co-champions; Rankings from NAIA Division II poll

1991 Illini–Badger–Hawkeye Football Conference standings
	Conf.					Overall
Team	W		L		T	W		L		T
No. 3 Eureka $^	6	–	0	–	0	10	–	1	–	0
MacMurray	5	–	1	–	0	6	–	3	–	1
Concordia (WI)	4	–	2	–	0	5	–	4	–	0
Lakeland	3	–	3	–	0	4	–	6	–	0
Greenville	2	–	4	–	0	4	–	5	–	0
Concordia (IL)	1	–	5	–	0	2	–	6	–	0
Blackburn	0	–	6	–	0	0	–	9	–	0
$ – Conference champion; ^ – NAIA Division II playoff participant; Rankings from NAIA Division II poll

1991 Indiana Collegiate Athletic Conference football standings
	Conf.					Overall
Team	W		L		T	W		L		T
Wabash $	5	–	1	–	0	7	–	2	–	0
No. 23 Hanover	4	–	2	–	0	7	–	3	–	0
DePauw	4	–	2	–	0	6	–	4	–	0
Anderson (IN)	4	–	2	–	0	5	–	5	–	0
Manchester	2	–	4	–	0	3	–	6	–	1
Rose–Hulman	2	–	4	–	0	3	–	7	–	0
Franklin (IN)	0	–	6	–	0	2	–	8	–	0
$ – Conference champion; Rankings from NAIA Division II poll

1991 Kansas Collegiate Athletic Conference football standings
	Conf.					Overall
Team	W		L		T	W		L		T
No. 8 St. Mary of the Plains +^	8	–	1	–	0	9	–	2	–	0
No. 13 Bethany (KS) +^	8	–	1	–	0	8	–	2	–	0
No. 14 Friends +	8	–	1	–	0	8	–	2	–	0
Ottawa	5	–	4	–	0	5	–	5	–	0
Southwestern (KS)	5	–	4	–	0	5	–	5	–	0
Bethel (KS)	3	–	6	–	0	4	–	6	–	0
Sterling	3	–	6	–	0	4	–	6	–	0
Kansas Wesleyan	3	–	6	–	0	3	–	7	–	0
McPherson	1	–	8	–	0	1	–	8	–	0
Tabor	1	–	8	–	0	1	–	9	–	0
+ – Conference co-champions; ^ – NAIA Division II playoff participant; Rankings from NAIA Division II poll

1991 Mid-South Conference football standings
	Conf.					Overall
Team	W		L		T	W		L		T
No. 2 Georgetown (KY) $^	6	–	0	–	0	13	–	1	–	0
No. 21 Campbellsville	4	–	2	–	0	9	–	2	–	0
Union (KY)	3	–	3	–	0	6	–	4	–	0
Evansville	3	–	3	–	0	5	–	5	–	0
Cumberland (KY)	3	–	3	–	0	4	–	5	–	0
Lambuth	2	–	4	–	0	3	–	7	–	0
Tusculum	0	–	6	–	0	0	–	10	–	0
$ – Conference champion; ^ – NAIA Division II playoff participant; Rankings from NAIA Division II poll

1991 Nebraska Intercollegiate Athletic Conference football standings
	Conf.					Overall
Team	W		L		T	W		L		T
No. 15Hastings $^	5	–	0	–	0	8	–	4	–	0
No. 16 Nebraska Wesleyan ^	4	–	1	–	0	8	–	3	–	0
Doane	2	–	3	–	0	5	–	4	–	0
Midland	2	–	3	–	0	3	–	7	–	0
Dana	1	–	4	–	0	3	–	6	–	0
Concordia (NE)	1	–	4	–	0	3	–	7	–	0
$ – Conference champion; ^ – NAIA Division II playoff participant; Rankings from NAIA Division II poll

1991 North Dakota College Athletic Conference football standings
	Conf.					Overall
Team	W		L		T	W		L		T
No. 6 Dickinson State +^	4	–	1	–	0	10	–	2	–	0
No. 18 Minot State +^	4	–	1	–	0	6	–	4	–	0
No. 22 Mary	3	–	2	–	0	7	–	2	–	0
Jamestown	2	–	3	–	0	4	–	5	–	0
Mayville State	1	–	4	–	0	4	–	5	–	0
Valley City State	1	–	4	–	0	2	–	7	–	0
+ – Conference co-champions; ^ – NAIA Division II playoff participant; Rankings from NAIA Division II poll

1991 South Dakota Intercollegiate Conference football standings
	Conf.					Overall
Team	W		L		T	W		L		T
Dakota Wesleyan +	4	–	1	–	0	5	–	5	–	0
South Dakota Tech +	4	–	1	–	0	4	–	5	–	0
Dakota State	3	–	2	–	0	8	–	3	–	0
Sioux Falls	2	–	3	–	0	5	–	5	–	0
Black Hills State	2	–	3	–	0	3	–	7	–	0
Huron	0	–	5	–	0	1	–	9	–	0
+ – Conference co-champions

1991 Texas Intercollegiate Athletic Association football standings
	Conf.					Overall
Team	W		L		T	W		L		T
No. 10 Midwestern State $^	5	–	0	–	0	9	–	3	–	0
Howard Payne	3	–	2	–	0	7	–	3	–	0
Austin	3	–	2	–	0	6	–	4	–	0
Hardin–Simmons	3	–	2	–	0	5	–	5	–	0
Sul Ross	1	–	4	–	0	1	–	7	–	0
McMurry	0	–	5	–	0	3	–	7	–	0
$ – Conference champion; ^ – NAIA Division II playoff participant; Rankings from NAIA Division II poll

1991 Wisconsin State University Conference football standings
	Conf.					Overall
Team	W		L		T	W		L		T
Wisconsin–La Crosse $^	7	–	1	–	0	10	–	2	–	0
No. 20 Wisconsin–Stevens Point	6	–	2	–	0	6	–	3	–	1
Wisconsin–Whitewater	6	–	2	–	0	6	–	4	–	0
Wisconsin–Platteville	4	–	3	–	1	6	–	3	–	1
Wisconsin–Oshkosh	4	–	4	–	0	5	–	5	–	0
Wisconsin–Stout	3	–	5	–	0	5	–	5	–	0
Wisconsin–River Falls	2	–	5	–	1	4	–	5	–	1
Wisconsin–Superior	1	–	6	–	1	2	–	6	–	1
Wisconsin–Eau Claire	1	–	6	–	1	2	–	7	–	1
$ – Conference champion; ^ – NCAA Division III playoff participant; Rankings from NAIA Division II poll

1991 NAIA Division II independents football records
	Conf.			Overall
Team	W	L	T	W		L		T
No. 11 Findlay ^		–		9	–	3	–	0
No. 17 Benedictine (KS)		–		8	–	3	–	0
No. 5 Westminster (PA) ^		–		7	–	3	–	0
No. 7 Peru State ^		–		7	–	4	–	0
St. Francis (IL)		–		6	–	5	–	0
Lindenwood		–		5	–	4	–	1
Northwestern (IA)		–		4	–	5	–	0
Cumberland (TN)		–		4	–	6	–	0
Mount St. Joseph		–		4	–	6	–	0
Tiffin		–		4	–	6	–	0
St. Ambrose		–		4	–	7	–	0
Geneva		–		3	–	6	–	1
Trinity (IL)		–		3	–	6	–	0
Westmar		–		3	–	6	–	0
Clinch Valley		–		2	–	6	–	0
Azusa Pacific		–		1	–	8	–	0
Oklahoma Panhandle State		–		1	–	10	–	0
^ – NAIA Division II playoff participant; Rankings from NAIA Division II poll

== Conference champions ==
Conference	Champion	Record
Columbia	Mount Rainier League: Central Washington; Mount Hood League: Lewis & Clark & Linfield	6–0; 5–1
Frontier	Rocky Mountain	4–2
Heart of America	William Jewell; Baker (KS)	5–1
Kansas	Bethany; Friends; St. Mary of the Plains	8–1
Mid-South	Georgetown (KY)	6–0
Nebraska	Hastings	5–0
North Dakota	Dickinson State; Minot State	4–1
South Dakota	South Dakota Tech; Dakota Wesleyan	4–1
Texas	Midwestern State	5–0

== Rankings ==
Final NAIA Division II poll rankings:

Rank	Team (first place votes)	Record (thru Nov. 16)	Points
1	Central Washington (17)	9–0	473
2	Georgetown (KY)	9–1	455
3	Eureka	10–0	431
4	Pacific Lutheran	8–1	415
5	Westminster (PA)	7–2	400
6	Dickinson State	8–1	361
7	Peru State	5–2	351
8	St. Mary of the Plains	9–1	324
9	Linfield	7–2	307
10	Midwestern State	8–2	291
11	Findlay	8–2	271
12	Lewis & Clark	7–1–1	256
13	Bethany (KS)	8–1	249
14	Friends	8–2	224
15	Hastings	7–3	206
16	Nebraska Wesleyan	8–2	183
17	Benedictine (KS)	7–2	177
18	Minot State	6–3	152
19	Baker	6–2–1	150
20	Wisconsin–Stevens Point	6–3–1	118
21	Campbellsville	9–2	113
22	Mary	7–2	96
23	Hanover	7–3	58
24	William Jewell	6–3	38
25	Southern Oregon	5–3–1	36

== Postseason ==
First Round; Campus sites
Eureka	14
Georgetown (KY)*	42
Westminster (PA)	8
Findlay*	9
Peru State	41
Nebraska Wesleyan*	20
Bethany	0
Midwestern State*	29
Minot State	21
Dickinson State*	26
St. Mary of the Plains	21
Hastings*	28
Central Washington	0
Pacific Lutheran‡	27
Lewis & Clark	30
Linfield*	59

Quarterfinals; Campus sites
Georgetown (KY)	37
Findlay*	19
Peru State	28
Midwestern State*	24
Dickinson State*	42
Hastings	10
Pacific Lutheran ‡	23
Linfield	0

Semifinals; Campus sites
Georgetown (KY)*	42
Peru State	28
Dickinson State*	25
Pacific Lutheran	47

Championship; Georgetown, KY
Georgetown (KY)*	28
Pacific Lutheran	20

- ‡ Game played at Puyallup, Washington

== See also ==
- 1991 NCAA Division I-A football season
- 1991 NCAA Division I-AA football season
- 1991 NCAA Division II football season
- 1991 NCAA Division III football season
