= 1992 Dayton Flyers football team =

American college football season

1992 Dayton Flyers football

NCAA Division III First Round, L 10–27 vs. Mount Union
- Conference: Independent
- Record: 10–1
- Head coach: Mike Kelly (12th season)
- Home stadium: Welcome Stadium

1992 NCAA Division III independents football records
	Conf.			Overall
Team	W	L	T	W		L		T
Dayton ^		–		10	–	1	–	0
Aurora ^		–		9	–	1	–	0
Ithaca ^		–		9	–	2	–	0
Evansville		–		7	–	2	–	0
Saint Peter's		–		7	–	2	–	0
Saint Francis (PA)		–		8	–	2	–	1
Drake		–		7	–	2	–	1
San Diego		–		7	–	2	–	1
Buffalo State ^		–		7	–	3	–	0
UAB		–		7	–	3	–	0
Wesley		–		7	–	3	–	0
Union (NY)		–		6	–	3	–	0
Frostburg State		–		6	–	3	–	1
Gannon		–		6	–	3	–	1
Cortland		–		7	–	4	–	0
Albany		–		6	–	4	–	0
Duquesne		–		5	–	4	–	0
Mercyhurst		–		5	–	4	–	1
Davidson		–		5	–	5	–	0
Maryville (TN)		–		5	–	5	–	0
Fairleigh Dickinson–Florham		–		4	–	5	–	0
Ferrum		–		4	–	5	–	0
Alfred		–		4	–	6	–	0
Buffalo		–		4	–	6	–	0
Catholic University		–		4	–	6	–	0
Georgetown		–		4	–	6	–	0
Hofstra		–		4	–	6	–	0
Canisius		–		3	–	6	–	1
Colorado College		–		3	–	6	–	0
Menlo		–		3	–	6	–	0
St. Lawrence		–		3	–	6	–	0
Brockport		–		3	–	7	–	0
Charleston Southern		–		3	–	7	–	0
Kentucky Wesleyan		–		3	–	7	–	0
Salisbury State		–		2	–	7	–	0
Siena		–		2	–	7	–	0
Hartwick		–		1	–	7	–	0
Methodist		–		0	–	10	–	0
^ – NCAA Division III playoff participant

The 1992 Dayton Flyers football team was an American football team that represented the University of Dayton as an independent during the 1992 NCAA Division III football season. Led by 12th-year head coach Mike Kelly, the Flyers compiled a record of 10–1. The team was ranked number one nationally before losing in the first round of the NCAA Division III Football Championship playoffs to Mount Union.

== Schedule ==
Date	Opponent	Site	Result	Attendance	Source
September 12	Wisconsin–Platteville	Welcome Stadium; Dayton, OH	W 48–0	7,761	
September 19	at Wheaton (IL)	McCully Field; Wheaton, IL	W 44–3	4,500	
September 26	at Urbana	Urbana, OH	W 45–0	1,500	
October 3	Mount St. Joseph	Welcome Stadium; Dayton, OH	W 47–0	7,833	
October 10	Mercyhurst	Welcome Stadium; Dayton, OH	W 42–14	3,287	
October 17	Drake	Welcome Stadium; Dayton, OH (rivalry)	W 38–9	6,317	
October 24	Thomas More	Welcome Stadium; Dayton, OH	W 18–7	5,836	
October 31	Evansville	Welcome Stadium; Dayton, OH	W 40–15	5,589	
November 7	at Hofstra	James M. Shuart Stadium; Hempstead, NY	W 24–13	5,283	
November 14	Mount Senario	Welcome Stadium; Dayton, OH	W 62–6	6,064	
November 21	Mount Union	Welcome Stadium; Dayton, OH (NCAA Division III First Round)	L 10–27		
