= 1992 Davidson Wildcats football team =

American college football season

1992 Davidson Wildcats football
- Conference: Independent
- Record: 5–5
- Head coach: Dave Fagg (7th season)
- Defensive coordinator: Mike MacIntyre (1st season)
- Home stadium: Richardson Stadium

1992 NCAA Division III independents football records
	Conf.			Overall
Team	W	L	T	W		L		T
Dayton ^		–		10	–	1	–	0
Aurora ^		–		9	–	1	–	0
Ithaca ^		–		9	–	2	–	0
Evansville		–		7	–	2	–	0
Saint Peter's		–		7	–	2	–	0
Saint Francis (PA)		–		8	–	2	–	1
Drake		–		7	–	2	–	1
San Diego		–		7	–	2	–	1
Buffalo State ^		–		7	–	3	–	0
UAB		–		7	–	3	–	0
Wesley		–		7	–	3	–	0
Union (NY)		–		6	–	3	–	0
Frostburg State		–		6	–	3	–	1
Gannon		–		6	–	3	–	1
Cortland		–		7	–	4	–	0
Albany		–		6	–	4	–	0
Duquesne		–		5	–	4	–	0
Mercyhurst		–		5	–	4	–	1
Davidson		–		5	–	5	–	0
Maryville (TN)		–		5	–	5	–	0
Fairleigh Dickinson–Florham		–		4	–	5	–	0
Ferrum		–		4	–	5	–	0
Alfred		–		4	–	6	–	0
Buffalo		–		4	–	6	–	0
Catholic University		–		4	–	6	–	0
Georgetown		–		4	–	6	–	0
Hofstra		–		4	–	6	–	0
Canisius		–		3	–	6	–	1
Colorado College		–		3	–	6	–	0
Menlo		–		3	–	6	–	0
St. Lawrence		–		3	–	6	–	0
Brockport		–		3	–	7	–	0
Charleston Southern		–		3	–	7	–	0
Kentucky Wesleyan		–		3	–	7	–	0
Salisbury State		–		2	–	7	–	0
Siena		–		2	–	7	–	0
Hartwick		–		1	–	7	–	0
Methodist		–		0	–	10	–	0
^ – NCAA Division III playoff participant

The 1992 Davidson Wildcats football team represented Davidson College as an independent during the 1992 NCAA Division III football season. Led by seventh-year head coach Dave Fagg, the Wildcats compiled an overall record of 5–5.

== Schedule ==
Date	Opponent	Site	Result	Attendance	Source
September 5	Guilford	Richardson Stadium; Davidson, NC	W 18–3	1,745	
September 12	at Sewanee	McGee Field; Sewanee, TN	L 20–37	1,200	
September 19	at Rhodes	Fargason Field; Memphis, TN	L 6–31	2,500	
September 26	Emory & Henry	Richardson Stadium; Davidson, NC	L 7–36	2,447	
October 10	Washington & Lee^{†}	Richardson Stadium; Davidson, NC	L 12–27	3,098	
October 17	at Methodist	Monarch Stadium; Fayetteville, NC	W 27–6	1,100	
October 24	Charleston Southern	Richardson Stadium; Davidson, NC	W 32–27	661	
October 31	at Hampden–Sydney	Hundley Stadium; Hampden-Sydney, VA	L 18–35	1,132	
November 7	Centre	Richardson Stadium; Davidson, NC	W 10–3	915	
November 14	at Bridgewater	Jopson Athletic Complex; Bridgewater, VA	W 28–13	1,000	
^{†}Homecoming
