= David Dowd (American football) =

American football player and coach (born 1952)

Biographical details
- Born: November 7, 1952 (age 73); Raleigh, North Carolina, U.S.
- Education: North Carolina A&T

Playing career
- c. 1974: Gardner–Webb
- c. 1975: Guilford
- Position: Quarterback

Coaching career (HC unless noted)
- 1982–1990: Gardner–Webb (AHC/OC/QB)
- 1990–2003: Charleston Southern
- 2004–2014: Sumter HS (SC) (QB)
- 2014–2019: West Ashley HS (SC) (QB)

Head coaching record
- Overall: 34–94

David Dowd is an American football coach and former player. He was the first head football coach at Charleston Southern University in North Charleston, South Carolina, serving from 1991 to 2002, compiling a record of 34–94.

Since leaving collegiate coaching, Dowd has served in a number of coaching roles in South Carolina high schools.

== Head coaching record ==
Year	Team	Overall	Conference	Standing	Bowl/playoffs
Charleston Southern Buccaneers (NCAA Division III independent) (1991–1992)
1991	Charleston Southern	3–7			
1992	Charleston Southern	3–7			
Charleston Southern Buccaneers (NCAA Division I-AA independent) (1993–2001)
1993	Charleston Southern	3–8			
1994	Charleston Southern	0–11			
1995	Charleston Southern	1–10			
1996	Charleston Southern	2–8			
1997	Charleston Southern	1–9			
1998	Charleston Southern	3–8			
1999	Charleston Southern	4–6			
2000	Charleston Southern	5–6			
2001	Charleston Southern	5–6			
Charleston Southern Buccaneers (Big South Conference) (2002)
2002	Charleston Southern	4–8	0–3	4th	
Charleston Southern:		34–94	0–3		
Total:		34–94			
