= 1991 Davidson Wildcats football team =

American college football season

1991 Davidson Wildcats football
- Conference: Independent
- Record: 4–5
- Head coach: Dave Fagg (6th season)
- Home stadium: Richardson Stadium

1991 NCAA Division III independents football records
	Conf.			Overall
Team	W	L	T	W		L		T
Dayton ^		–		13	–	1	–	0
Ithaca ^		–		12	–	1	–	0
Union (NY) ^		–		10	–	1	–	0
Buffalo State		–		9	–	2	–	0
Wesley		–		9	–	2	–	0
Hofstra		–		8	–	2	–	0
Ferrum		–		7	–	2	–	0
Alfred		–		7	–	3	–	0
Cortland		–		7	–	3	–	0
Frostburg State		–		7	–	3	–	0
Maryville (TN)		–		7	–	3	–	0
San Diego		–		7	–	3	–	0
Coast Guard		–		6	–	3	–	0
Aurora		–		5	–	3	–	1
Georgetown		–		6	–	4	–	0
Mercyhurst		–		5	–	4	–	0
UAB		–		4	–	3	–	2
Albany		–		5	–	5	–	0
Brockport		–		5	–	5	–	0
Catholic University		–		5	–	5	–	0
Saint Peter's		–		4	–	4	–	0
Wagner		–		5	–	5	–	0
Davidson		–		4	–	5	–	0
Drake		–		4	–	6	–	0
Colorado College		–		3	–	6	–	0
Buffalo		–		3	–	7	–	0
Charleston Southern		–		3	–	7	–	0
Gannon		–		3	–	7	–	0
Quincy		–		3	–	7	–	0
Canisius		–		2	–	7	–	0
Fairleigh Dickinson–Florham		–		2	–	7	–	0
Menlo		–		2	–	7	–	0
Kentucky Wesleyan		–		2	–	8	–	0
Methodist		–		2	–	8	–	0
Norwich		–		2	–	8	–	0
Salisbury State		–		1	–	9	–	0
Western Connecticut State		–		1	–	9	–	0
Duquesne		–		0	–	9	–	0
^ – NCAA Division III playoff participant

The 1991 Davidson Wildcats football team represented Davidson College as an independent during the 1991 NCAA Division III football season. Led by sixth-year head coach Dave Fagg, the Wildcats compiled an overall record of 4–5.

== Schedule ==
Date	Opponent	Site	Result	Attendance	Source
September 7	at Guilford	Armfield Athletic Center; Greensboro, NC	L 3–21	2,100	
September 14	Clinch Valley	Richardson Stadium; Davidson, NC	W 32–7	1,431–1,432	
September 21	Rhodes	Richardson Stadium; Davidson, NC	L 9–13	1,362	
September 28	at Emory & Henry	Fred Selfe Stadium; Emory, VA	L 14–39	5,450	
October 12	at Washington & Lee	Wilson Field; Lexington, VA	W 16–14	5,132–5,320	
October 19	at Methodist	Monarch Stadium; Fayetteville, NC	L 28–30	500	
October 26	Charleston Southern	Richardson Stadium; Davidson, NC	W 33–17	2,315	
November 2	Hampden–Sydney	Richardson Stadium; Davidson, NC	L 14–56	2,056	
November 16	Bridgewater	Richardson Stadium; Davidson, NC	W 30–7	954	
