= 1991 Buffalo Bulls football team =

American college football season

1991 Buffalo Bulls football
- Conference: Independent
- Record: 3–7
- Head coach: Sam Sanders (2nd season)
- Defensive coordinator: Mike Donnelly (2nd season)
- Captains: Eric Polanski; Dave Short
- Home stadium: Rotary Field

1991 NCAA Division III independents football records
	Conf.			Overall
Team	W	L	T	W		L		T
Dayton ^		–		13	–	1	–	0
Ithaca ^		–		12	–	1	–	0
Union (NY) ^		–		10	–	1	–	0
Buffalo State		–		9	–	2	–	0
Wesley		–		9	–	2	–	0
Hofstra		–		8	–	2	–	0
Ferrum		–		7	–	2	–	0
Alfred		–		7	–	3	–	0
Cortland		–		7	–	3	–	0
Frostburg State		–		7	–	3	–	0
Maryville (TN)		–		7	–	3	–	0
San Diego		–		7	–	3	–	0
Coast Guard		–		6	–	3	–	0
Aurora		–		5	–	3	–	1
Georgetown		–		6	–	4	–	0
Mercyhurst		–		5	–	4	–	0
UAB		–		4	–	3	–	2
Albany		–		5	–	5	–	0
Brockport		–		5	–	5	–	0
Catholic University		–		5	–	5	–	0
Saint Peter's		–		4	–	4	–	0
Wagner		–		5	–	5	–	0
Davidson		–		4	–	5	–	0
Drake		–		4	–	6	–	0
Colorado College		–		3	–	6	–	0
Buffalo		–		3	–	7	–	0
Charleston Southern		–		3	–	7	–	0
Gannon		–		3	–	7	–	0
Quincy		–		3	–	7	–	0
Canisius		–		2	–	7	–	0
Fairleigh Dickinson–Florham		–		2	–	7	–	0
Menlo		–		2	–	7	–	0
Kentucky Wesleyan		–		2	–	8	–	0
Methodist		–		2	–	8	–	0
Norwich		–		2	–	8	–	0
Salisbury State		–		1	–	9	–	0
Western Connecticut State		–		1	–	9	–	0
Duquesne		–		0	–	9	–	0
^ – NCAA Division III playoff participant

The 1991 Buffalo Bulls football team represented the University at Buffalo as an independent during the 1991 NCAA Division III football season. Led by Sam Sanders in his second season as head coach, the team compiled a record of 3–7.

== Schedule ==
Date	Opponent	Site	Result	Attendance	Source
September 14	at Lafayette	Fisher Field; Easton, PA	L 21–42	4,312	
September 21	Montclair State	Rotary Field; Buffalo, NY	L 3–7	3,200	
September 28	at Westminster (PA)	New Wilmington, PA	L 0–38	2,100	
October 4	at Hofstra	Hofstra Stadium; Hempstead, NY	L 33–38	4,611	
October 12	Canisius	Rotary Field; Buffalo, NY	W 49–7	5,389	
October 19	at Ithaca	South Hill Field; Ithaca, NY	L 0–50	1,170	
October 26	at Brockport	Brockport, NY	W 30–28	975	
November 2	Duquesne	Rotary Field; Buffalo, NY	W 49–0	950	
November 9	at Southern Connecticut State	New Haven, CT	L 21–49	535	
November 16	at East Stroudsburg	East Stroudsburg, PA	L 25–45	1,050	
