= 1991 Dayton Flyers football team =

American college football season

1991 Dayton Flyers football

NCAA Division III Championship, L 20–34 vs. Ithaca
- Conference: Independent
- Record: 13–1
- Head coach: Mike Kelly (11th season)
- Home stadium: Welcome Stadium

1991 NCAA Division III independents football records
	Conf.			Overall
Team	W	L	T	W		L		T
Dayton ^		–		13	–	1	–	0
Ithaca ^		–		12	–	1	–	0
Union (NY) ^		–		10	–	1	–	0
Buffalo State		–		9	–	2	–	0
Wesley		–		9	–	2	–	0
Hofstra		–		8	–	2	–	0
Ferrum		–		7	–	2	–	0
Alfred		–		7	–	3	–	0
Cortland		–		7	–	3	–	0
Frostburg State		–		7	–	3	–	0
Maryville (TN)		–		7	–	3	–	0
San Diego		–		7	–	3	–	0
Coast Guard		–		6	–	3	–	0
Aurora		–		5	–	3	–	1
Georgetown		–		6	–	4	–	0
Mercyhurst		–		5	–	4	–	0
UAB		–		4	–	3	–	2
Albany		–		5	–	5	–	0
Brockport		–		5	–	5	–	0
Catholic University		–		5	–	5	–	0
Saint Peter's		–		4	–	4	–	0
Wagner		–		5	–	5	–	0
Davidson		–		4	–	5	–	0
Drake		–		4	–	6	–	0
Colorado College		–		3	–	6	–	0
Buffalo		–		3	–	7	–	0
Charleston Southern		–		3	–	7	–	0
Gannon		–		3	–	7	–	0
Quincy		–		3	–	7	–	0
Canisius		–		2	–	7	–	0
Fairleigh Dickinson–Florham		–		2	–	7	–	0
Menlo		–		2	–	7	–	0
Kentucky Wesleyan		–		2	–	8	–	0
Methodist		–		2	–	8	–	0
Norwich		–		2	–	8	–	0
Salisbury State		–		1	–	9	–	0
Western Connecticut State		–		1	–	9	–	0
Duquesne		–		0	–	9	–	0
^ – NCAA Division III playoff participant

The 1991 Dayton Flyers football team was an American football team that represented the University of Dayton as an independent during the 1991 NCAA Division III football season. Led by 11th-year head coach Mike Kelly, the Flyers compiled an overall record of 13–1, with their only loss coming in the national championship game against Ithaca.

== Schedule ==
Date	Opponent	Site	Result	Attendance	Source
September 7	Urbana	Welcome Stadium; Dayton, OH	W 42–0	6,492	
September 14	John Carroll	Welcome Stadium; Dayton, OH	W 24–7	8,139	
September 21	Anderson (IN)	Welcome Stadium; Dayton, OH	W 50–7	9,165	
September 28	Mercyhurst	Welcome Stadium; Dayton, OH	W 48–21	6,191	
October 12	at Drake	Drake Stadium; Des Moines, IA (rivalry)	W 13–0	1,780	
October 19	Northwood	Welcome Stadium; Dayton, OH	W 21–6	6,168	
October 26	at Gannon	Erie, PA	W 35–6	1,200	
November 2	at Ferrum	Ferrum, VA	W 31–12	5,850	
November 9	Hofstra	Welcome Stadium; Dayton, OH	W 14–7	9,787	
November 16	at Evansville	Evansville, IN	W 48–6	1,200	
November 23	Baldwin–Wallace	Welcome Stadium; Dayton, OH (NCAA Division III First Round)	W 27–10		
November 30	at Allegheny	Robertson Stadium; Meadville, PA (NCAA Division III Quarterfinal)	W 28–23 ^{OT}		
December 7	Saint John's (MN)	Welcome Stadium; Dayton, OH (NCAA Division III Semifinal)	W 19–7		
December 14	vs. Ithaca	Hawkins Stadium; Bradenton, FL (NCAA Division III Championship)	L 20–34	5,469	
