= 1991 Ithaca Bombers football team =

American college football season

1991 Ithaca Bombers football

NCAA Division III champion Lambert Cup

Stagg Bowl, W 34–20 vs. Dayton
- Conference: Independent
- Record: 12–1
- Head coach: Jim Butterfield (25th season)
- Captains: Joe Palladino; Chris White
- Home stadium: South Hill Field

1991 NCAA Division III independents football records
	Conf.			Overall
Team	W	L	T	W		L		T
Dayton ^		–		13	–	1	–	0
Ithaca ^		–		12	–	1	–	0
Union (NY) ^		–		10	–	1	–	0
Buffalo State		–		9	–	2	–	0
Wesley		–		9	–	2	–	0
Hofstra		–		8	–	2	–	0
Ferrum		–		7	–	2	–	0
Alfred		–		7	–	3	–	0
Cortland		–		7	–	3	–	0
Frostburg State		–		7	–	3	–	0
Maryville (TN)		–		7	–	3	–	0
San Diego		–		7	–	3	–	0
Coast Guard		–		6	–	3	–	0
Aurora		–		5	–	3	–	1
Georgetown		–		6	–	4	–	0
Mercyhurst		–		5	–	4	–	0
UAB		–		4	–	3	–	2
Albany		–		5	–	5	–	0
Brockport		–		5	–	5	–	0
Catholic University		–		5	–	5	–	0
Saint Peter's		–		4	–	4	–	0
Wagner		–		5	–	5	–	0
Davidson		–		4	–	5	–	0
Drake		–		4	–	6	–	0
Colorado College		–		3	–	6	–	0
Buffalo		–		3	–	7	–	0
Charleston Southern		–		3	–	7	–	0
Gannon		–		3	–	7	–	0
Quincy		–		3	–	7	–	0
Canisius		–		2	–	7	–	0
Fairleigh Dickinson–Florham		–		2	–	7	–	0
Menlo		–		2	–	7	–	0
Kentucky Wesleyan		–		2	–	8	–	0
Methodist		–		2	–	8	–	0
Norwich		–		2	–	8	–	0
Salisbury State		–		1	–	9	–	0
Western Connecticut State		–		1	–	9	–	0
Duquesne		–		0	–	9	–	0
^ – NCAA Division III playoff participant

The 1991 Ithaca Bombers football team was an American football team that represented Ithaca College as an independent during the 1991 NCAA Division III football season. In their 22nd season under head coach Jim Butterfield, the Bombers compiled a 12–1 record. The team's only loss was to Division II Springfield. The team participated in the NCAA Division III playoffs, defeating Glassboro State in the first round, Union in the quarterfinals, Susquehanna in the semifinals, and Dayton in the Stagg Bowl to win the Division III national championship. They were also awarded the Division III Lambert Cup.

Senior quarterback Todd Wilkowski led Ithaca to two national championships, having also led the 1988 Ithaca team. Fullback Jeff Wittman received first-team honors on the 1991 Division III All-America team. Wittman was later inducted into the College Football Hall of Fame. Butterfield was named the 1991 Kodak Coach of the Year by the American Football Coaches Association. Senior split end Nick Ismailoff led the team in receiving with 54 catches for 836 yards.

The team played its home games at South Hill Field in Ithaca, New York. On November 9, the school set a home attendance record (since broken) of 10,903 against SUNY Cortland. The prior record was 9,000 set in 1979.

== Schedule ==
Date	Opponent	Site	Result	Attendance	Source
September 14	St. Lawrence	South Hill Field; Ithaca, NY	W 45–7	4,356–5,202	
September 21	Albany State^{†}	South Hill Field; Ithaca, NY	W 38–7	4,528	
September 28	at Alfred	Alfred, NY	W 31–8	5,700	
October 5	at Springfield	Springfield, MA	L 10–14	1,200	
October 12	American International	South Hill Field; Ithaca, NY	W 23–20	2,698	
October 19	Buffalo	South Hill Field; Ithaca, NY	W 50–0	1,170	
October 26	at Buffalo State	Buffalo, NY	W 41–23	800	
November 9	Cortland State	South Hill Field; Ithaca, NY (Cortaca Jug)	W 23–14	10,903	
November 16	at Brockport	Brockport, NY	W 52–0	975	
November 23	Glassboro State	South Hill Field; Ithaca, NY (NCAA Division III first round)	W 31–10		
November 30	Union (NY)	South Hill Field; Ithaca, NY (NCAA Division III quarterfinal)	W 35–23		
December 7	at Susquehanna	Selinsgrove, PA (NCAA Division III semifinal)	W 49–13		
December 14	vs. Dayton	Hawkins Stadium; Bradenton, FL (Stagg Bowl—NCAA Division III championship game)	W 34–20	5,469	
^{†}Homecoming
