= Jim Hilyer =

American football player and coach (1935–2022)

Biographical details
- Born: July 1, 1935
- Died: January 26, 2022 (aged 86)

Playing career
- 1954–1957: Stetson
- Positions: Offensive guard, linebacker

Coaching career (HC unless noted)
- 1963–1967: Mississippi State (assistant)
- 1968–1973: Auburn (assistant)
- 1974–1976: Washington Redskins (assistant)
- 1977–1981: Auburn (assistant)
- 1982–1985: Birmingham Stallions (assistant)
- 1991–1994: UAB

Head coaching record
- Overall: 27–12–2

Jim Hilyer (July 1, 1935 – January 26, 2022) was an American football coach. He was the first head football coach at University of Alabama at Birmingham (UAB), serving from 1991 to 1994 and compiling a record of 27–12–2. Hilyer played college football at Stetson University, where he was a four-year letterwinner at offensive guard and linebacker.

== Coaching career ==
Hilyer's coaching career began at Mainland High School in Daytona Beach, Florida (1957–1963), where he coached football and track and also played for the Orlando Thunderbirds of the Continental Football League during this period from 1958 to 1960. He then joined the staff at Mississippi State University as an assistant in 1963 and stayed through 1967. He was an assistant coach at Auburn University from 1968 through 1973 before joining George Allen and the Washington Redskins staff in 1974. Hilyer returned to Auburn from 1977 to 1981, and then he joined the staff of the Birmingham Stallions of the United States Football League in 1982.

=== UAB ===
In 1985, Hilyer became the strength and conditioning coach at UAB, and was also an assistant professor in the School of Medicine and an adjunct associate professor in the Department of Health Education and Physical Education. In 1989, he became the coach of the UAB club football team and had a record of 3–10 during his two years at the club level. On March 13, 1991, Hilyer was named the first head coach at UAB for the inaugural 1991 season. In four seasons from 1991 to 1994 as head coach at UAB, he coached the Blazers to a record of 27–12–2.

== Head coaching record ==
Year	Team	Overall	Conference	Standing	Bowl/playoffs
UAB Blazers (NCAA Division III independent) (1991–1992)
1991	UAB	4–3–2			
1992	UAB	7–3			
UAB Blazers (NCAA Division I-AA independent) (1993–1994)
1993	UAB	9–2			
1994	UAB	7–4			
UAB:		27–12–2			
Total:		27–12–2			
