= 1991 Charleston Southern Buccaneers football team =

American college football season

1991 Charleston Southern Buccaneers football
- Conference: Independent
- Record: 3–7
- Head coach: David Dowd (1st season)
- Home stadium: Buccaneer Field

1991 NCAA Division III independents football records
| | Conf. | | | Overall |
| Team | W | L | T | W | | L | | T |
|---|---|---|---|---|---|---|---|---|
| Dayton ^ | | – | | 13 | – | 1 | – | 0 |
| Ithaca ^ | | – | | 12 | – | 1 | – | 0 |
| Union (NY) ^ | | – | | 10 | – | 1 | – | 0 |
| Buffalo State | | – | | 9 | – | 2 | – | 0 |
| Wesley | | – | | 9 | – | 2 | – | 0 |
| Hofstra | | – | | 8 | – | 2 | – | 0 |
| Ferrum | | – | | 7 | – | 2 | – | 0 |
| Alfred | | – | | 7 | – | 3 | – | 0 |
| Cortland | | – | | 7 | – | 3 | – | 0 |
| Frostburg State | | – | | 7 | – | 3 | – | 0 |
| Maryville (TN) | | – | | 7 | – | 3 | – | 0 |
| San Diego | | – | | 7 | – | 3 | – | 0 |
| Coast Guard | | – | | 6 | – | 3 | – | 0 |
| Aurora | | – | | 5 | – | 3 | – | 1 |
| Georgetown | | – | | 6 | – | 4 | – | 0 |
| Mercyhurst | | – | | 5 | – | 4 | – | 0 |
| UAB | | – | | 4 | – | 3 | – | 2 |
| Albany | | – | | 5 | – | 5 | – | 0 |
| Brockport | | – | | 5 | – | 5 | – | 0 |
| Catholic University | | – | | 5 | – | 5 | – | 0 |
| Saint Peter's | | – | | 4 | – | 4 | – | 0 |
| Wagner | | – | | 5 | – | 5 | – | 0 |
| Davidson | | – | | 4 | – | 5 | – | 0 |
| Drake | | – | | 4 | – | 6 | – | 0 |
| Colorado College | | – | | 3 | – | 6 | – | 0 |
| Buffalo | | – | | 3 | – | 7 | – | 0 |
| Charleston Southern | | – | | 3 | – | 7 | – | 0 |
| Gannon | | – | | 3 | – | 7 | – | 0 |
| Quincy | | – | | 3 | – | 7 | – | 0 |
| Canisius | | – | | 2 | – | 7 | – | 0 |
| Fairleigh Dickinson–Florham | | – | | 2 | – | 7 | – | 0 |
| Menlo | | – | | 2 | – | 7 | – | 0 |
| Kentucky Wesleyan | | – | | 2 | – | 8 | – | 0 |
| Methodist | | – | | 2 | – | 8 | – | 0 |
| Norwich | | – | | 2 | – | 8 | – | 0 |
| Salisbury State | | – | | 1 | – | 9 | – | 0 |
| Western Connecticut State | | – | | 1 | – | 9 | – | 0 |
| Duquesne | | – | | 0 | – | 9 | – | 0 |
^ – NCAA Division III playoff participant

The 1991 Charleston Southern Buccaneers football team represented Charleston Southern University as an independent during the 1991 NCAA Division III football season, and was the first team fielded by the school. Led by first-year head coach David Dowd, the Buccaneers compiled a record of 3–7 during their inaugural season. Charleston Southern played home games at Buccaneer Field in North Charleston, South Carolina.

== Schedule ==
| Date | Opponent | Site | Result | Attendance | Source |
|---|---|---|---|---|---|
| September 7 | at Methodist | Monarch Stadium; Fayetteville, NC | L 8–18 | | |
| September 14 | Mars Hill | Buccaneer Field; North Charleston, SC | L 0–29 | | |
| September 21 | at Apprentice | Apprentice Athletic Field; Newport News, VA | W 13–9 | 550 | |
| September 28 | at Guilford | Armfield Athletic Center; Greensboro, NC | L 6–40 | 2,500 | |
| October 4 | The Citadel JV | Buccaneer Field; North Charleston, SC | L 9–10 | 1,100 | |
| October 19 | UAB^{†} | Buccaneer Field; North Charleston, SC | L 19–33 | 3,600 | |
| October 26 | at Davidson | Richardson Stadium; Davidson, NC | L 17–33 | 2,315 | |
| November 2 | Gallaudet | Buccaneer Field; North Charleston, SC | W 35–16 | | |
| November 9 | at South Carolina State | Oliver C. Dawson Stadium; Orangeburg, SC | L 0–12 | 4,602 | |
| November 16 | Frostburg State | Buccaneer Field; North Charleston, SC | W 21–19 | | |
^{†}Homecoming
