= Jerry Clark =

Jerry Clark may refer to:

- Jerome Clark (born 1946), American researcher and writer
- Jerry Clark (American football) (1932–2017), American football player and coach
- Jerry Clark (politician) (born 1952), delegate for the Maryland House of Delegates
- Jerry Clark (music executive) philanthropist, on-air personality and music executive.
