= 1992 Cornell Rams football team =

American college football season

1992 Cornell Rams football

MWC champion MWC South Division champion

MWC championship game, W 40–14 at Beloit
- Conference: Midwest Conference
- South Division
- Record: 10–0 (5–0 MWC)
- Head coach: Steve Miller (6th season)
- Offensive coordinator: Rick Coles (3rd season)

1992 Midwest Conference football standings
	Conf.					Overall
Team	W		L		T	W		L		T
North Division
Beloit xy	4	–	1	–	0	6	–	3	–	0
Carroll (WI)	4	–	1	–	0	8	–	1	–	0
St. Norbert	3	–	2	–	0	4	–	5	–	0
Ripon	2	–	3	–	0	5	–	4	–	0
Lake Forest	1	–	4	–	0	3	–	6	–	0
Lawrence	1	–	4	–	0	2	–	7	–	0
South Division
Cornell (IA) xy$	5	–	0	–	0	10	–	0	–	0
Coe	4	–	1	–	0	8	–	1	–	0
Monmouth (IL)	3	–	2	–	0	5	–	4	–	0
Illinois College	2	–	3	–	0	5	–	4	–	0
Knox	1	–	4	–	0	2	–	7	–	0
Grinnell	0	–	5	–	0	0	–	9	–	0
Championship: Cornell (IA) 40, Beloit 14
$ – Conference champion; x – Division champion/co-champions; y – Championship game participant

The 1992 Cornell Rams football team was an American football team that represented Cornell College, located in Mount Vernon, Iowa, as a member of the South Division of the Midwest Conference (MWC) during the 1992 NCAA Division III football season. In their sixth year under head coach Steve Miller, the Rams compiled a perfect 10–0 record. It was the best record in program history. Cornell won the South Division title with a record of 5–0 in conference play and beat Beloit in the MWC championship game, 40–14.

Defensive back Brent Sands led the team with nine interceptions and 162 interception return yards and was selected as the most valuable defensive player in the Midwest Conference South Division. Seven Cornell players were selected as first-team players on the All-Midwest Conference South Division team. In addition to Sands, the other honorees were: quarterback Matt Miller; running back Jason Bennett; offensive lineman Dan Junkins; defensive ends Randy Wies and Tim Fitzpatrick; and linebacker Shane Ehresman.

The team's other individual statistical leaders included: Matt Miller with 1,086 passing yards and seven passing touchdowns; Jason Bennett with 734 rushing yards and 66 points scored; and Jeff Menster with 21 receptions for 415 yards and four touchdowns.

== Schedule ==
Date	Opponent	Site	Result	Attendance	Source
September 12	Buena Vista*	Mount Vernon, IA	W 23–14	500	
September 19	at Beloit*	Beloit, WI	W 20–6	2,000–2,200	
September 26	St. Norbert*	Mount Vernon, IA	W 28–15	400	
October 3	at Lake Forest*	Lake Forest, IL	W 36–0	400	
October 10	Knox	Mount Vernon, IA	W 33–0	700	
October 17	at Monmouth (IL)	Monmouth, IL	W 28–18	500	
October 24	at Grinnell	Grinnell, IA	W 63–20	200	
October 31	Illinois College	Mount Vernon, IA	W 26–17	500	
November 7	at Coe	Clark Field; Cedar Rapids, IA	W 37–20	3,500	
November 14	at Beloit*	Beloit, WI (Midwest Conference championship game)	W 40–14	2,000	
*Non-conference game
