= 1992 Wisconsin–Whitewater Warhawks football team =

American college football season

1992 Wisconsin–Whitewater Warhawks football
- Conference: Wisconsin State University Conference
- Record: 8–2 (5–2 WSUC)
- Head coach: Bob Berezowitz (8th season)
- Offensive coordinator: Stan Zweifel (2nd season)
- Home stadium: Warhawks Stadium

1992 Wisconsin State University Conference football standings
	Conf.					Overall
Team	W		L		T	W		L		T
Wisconsin–La Crosse $^	6	–	0	–	1	12	–	0	–	1
Wisconsin–Whitewater	5	–	2	–	0	8	–	2	–	0
Wisconsin–River Falls	4	–	2	–	1	6	–	2	–	1
Wisconsin–Platteville	4	–	3	–	0	5	–	4	–	0
Wisconsin–Stevens Point	4	–	3	–	0	5	–	4	–	0
Wisconsin–Eau Claire	3	–	4	–	0	5	–	5	–	0
Wisconsin–Stout	1	–	6	–	0	2	–	7	–	0
Wisconsin–Oshkosh	0	–	7	–	0	1	–	8	–	0
Wisconsin–Superior	0	–	0	–	0	1	–	1	–	0
$ – Conference champion; ^ – NCAA Division III playoff participant

The 1992 Wisconsin–Whitewater Warhawks football team represented the University of Wisconsin–Whitewater as a member of the Wisconsin State University Conference (WSUC) during the 1992 NCAA Division III football season. Led by eighth-year head coach Bob Berezowitz, the Warhawks compiled an overall record of 8–2 with a mark of 5–2 in conference play, placing in second place in the WSUC. Wisconsin–Whitewater played home games at Warhawks Stadium in Whitewater, Wisconsin.

== Schedule ==
Date	Opponent	Site	Result	Attendance	Source
September 10	Upper Iowa*	Warhawks Stadium; Whitewater, WI	W 30–26	3,201	
September 19	at Wisconsin–Platteville	Platteville, WI	W 12–0	4,250	
September 26	Livingstone*	Warhawks Stadium; Whitewater, WI	W 9–0	2,956	
October 3	Wisconsin–Stevens Point	Warhawks Stadium; Whitewater, WI	W 14–13	2,671	
October 10	at Wisconsin–Stout	Menomonie, WI	W 42–3	2,423	
October 17	at St. Ambrose*	Davenport, IA	W 34–16		
October 24	Wisconsin–River Falls	Warhawks Stadium; Whitewater, WI	W 21–14	7,268	
October 31	at Wisconsin–Eau Claire	Eau Claire, WI	L 13–35	1,200	
November 7	Wisconsin–La Crosse	Warhawks Stadium; Whitewater, WI	L 3–13	4,795	
November 14	at Wisconsin–Oshkosh	Oshkosh, WI	W 34–20	500	
*Non-conference game
