= 1991 UAB Blazers football team =

American college football season

1991 UAB Blazers football
- Conference: Independent
- Record: 4–3–2
- Head coach: Jim Hilyer (1st season)
- Offensive scheme: Multiple
- Base defense: 3–4
- Home stadium: Legion Field

1991 NCAA Division III independents football records
	Conf.			Overall
Team	W	L	T	W		L		T
Dayton ^		–		13	–	1	–	0
Ithaca ^		–		12	–	1	–	0
Union (NY) ^		–		10	–	1	–	0
Buffalo State		–		9	–	2	–	0
Wesley		–		9	–	2	–	0
Hofstra		–		8	–	2	–	0
Ferrum		–		7	–	2	–	0
Alfred		–		7	–	3	–	0
Cortland		–		7	–	3	–	0
Frostburg State		–		7	–	3	–	0
Maryville (TN)		–		7	–	3	–	0
San Diego		–		7	–	3	–	0
Coast Guard		–		6	–	3	–	0
Aurora		–		5	–	3	–	1
Georgetown		–		6	–	4	–	0
Mercyhurst		–		5	–	4	–	0
UAB		–		4	–	3	–	2
Albany		–		5	–	5	–	0
Brockport		–		5	–	5	–	0
Catholic University		–		5	–	5	–	0
Saint Peter's		–		4	–	4	–	0
Wagner		–		5	–	5	–	0
Davidson		–		4	–	5	–	0
Drake		–		4	–	6	–	0
Colorado College		–		3	–	6	–	0
Buffalo		–		3	–	7	–	0
Charleston Southern		–		3	–	7	–	0
Gannon		–		3	–	7	–	0
Quincy		–		3	–	7	–	0
Canisius		–		2	–	7	–	0
Fairleigh Dickinson–Florham		–		2	–	7	–	0
Menlo		–		2	–	7	–	0
Kentucky Wesleyan		–		2	–	8	–	0
Methodist		–		2	–	8	–	0
Norwich		–		2	–	8	–	0
Salisbury State		–		1	–	9	–	0
Western Connecticut State		–		1	–	9	–	0
Duquesne		–		0	–	9	–	0
^ – NCAA Division III playoff participant

The 1991 UAB Blazers football team represented the University of Alabama at Birmingham (UAB) in the 1991 NCAA Division III football season, and was the first team fielded by the school. The Blazers' head coach was Jim Hilyer. They played their home games at Legion Field in Birmingham, Alabama and competed as an NCAA Division III independent. The Blazers finished their inaugural season with a record of 4–3–2.

== Schedule ==
Date	Opponent	Site	Result	Attendance	Source
September 7	at Millsaps	Alumni Field; Jackson, MS	L 0–28	1,000	
September 14	Evangel	Legion Field; Birmingham, AL	L 10–28	5,132	
September 21	at Washington and Lee	Wilson Field; Lexington, VA	W 34–21	3,183	
September 28	at Hampden–Sydney	Lewis C. Everett Stadium; Hampden Sydney, VA	T 35–35	5,125	
October 12	Lindenwood	Legion Field; Birmingham, AL	T 17–17	6,207	
October 19	at Charleston Southern	Buccaneer Field; North Charleston, SC	W 33–19	3,600	
October 26	Ferrum	Legion Field; Birmingham, AL	L 7–35	5,579	
November 9	Hastings	Legion Field; Birmingham, AL	W 9–7	4,157	
November 16	Clinch Valley	Legion Field; Birmingham, AL	W 25–6	2,226	
