= 1961 Cornell Rams football team =

American college football season

1961 Cornell Rams football

MWC co-champion
- Conference: Midwest Conference
- Record: 6–2 (6–2 MWC)
- Head coach: Jerry Clark (3rd season)

1961 Midwest Conference football standings
	Conf.					Overall
Team	W		L		T	W		L		T
Cornell (IA) +	6	–	2	–	0	6	–	2	–	0
Grinnell +	6	–	2	–	0	6	–	2	–	0
St. Olaf +	6	–	2	–	0	6	–	2	–	0
Carleton	5	–	2	–	1	5	–	2	–	1
Ripon	4	–	3	–	1	4	–	3	–	1
Coe	4	–	4	–	0	4	–	4	–	0
Lawrence	4	–	4	–	0	4	–	4	–	0
Beloit	2	–	6	–	0	2	–	6	–	0
Knox	1	–	7	–	0	1	–	7	–	0
Monmouth (IL)	1	–	7	–	0	1	–	7	–	0
+ – Conference co-champions

The 1961 Cornell Rams football team was an American football team that represented Cornell College of Vernon, Iowa, as a member of the Midwest Conference (MWC) during the 1961 college football season. In their third year under head coach Jerry Clark, the Rams compiled a 6–2 record (played no non-conference games), finished in a three-way tie with Grinnell and St. Olaf for the conference championship, and outscored opponents by a total of 209 to 118.

The team gained 2,606 yards of total offense (326 yards per game) while allowing only 1,748 yards by opponents (219 yards per game). The statistical leaders included quarterback Bill Thorp with 1,231 passing yards; and halfback Dave Areuds with 473 rushing yards and 90 points scored.

== Schedule ==
Date	Opponent	Site	Result	Attendance	Source
September 23	Lawrence	Mount Vernon, IA	W 21–6	700	
September 30	Carleton	Mount Vernon, IA	W 20–19	1,700	
October 7	at St. Olaf	Northfield, MN	W 26–7	5,500	
October 14	at Beloit	Beloit, WI	W 27–6	1,100	
October 21	Coe^{†}	Mount Vernon, IA	W 29–21	3,500	
October 28	at Ripon	Ripon, WI	L 15–16	1,600	
November 4	at Knox	Galesburg, IL	W 45–13	900	
November 11	Grinnell	Mount Vernon, IA	L 26–30	2,000	
^{†}Homecoming
