= Steve Glynn =

American football coach

Playing career
- 1961–1962: C. W. Post

Coaching career (HC unless noted)
- 1965–1966: Siena

Head coaching record
- Overall: 3–8

Steve Glynn is an American former college football coach. He was the first head football coach for the now-defunct Siena College football program. He coached in 1965 and 1966 and compiled a record of 3–8.

== Playing career ==
Glynn graduated from Lynbrook High School in Lynbrook, New York in 1958. After serving in the United States Army, Glynn attended but did not graduate from C.W. Post Campus of Long Island University. At C.W. Post he played football from 1961 to 1962.

== Head coaching record ==
Year	Team	Overall	Conference	Standing	Bowl/playoffs
Siena Saints (Independent) (1965–1966)
1965	Siena	1–2			
1966	Siena	2–6			
Total:		3–8			
