= 1992 Wisconsin–La Crosse Eagles football team =

American college football season

1992 Wisconsin–La Crosse Eagles football

NCAA Division III champion WSUC champion

Stagg Bowl, W 16–12 vs. Washington & Jefferson
- Conference: Wisconsin State University Conference
- Record: 12–0–1 (6–0–1 WSUC)
- Head coach: Roger Harring (24th season)
- Home stadium: Veterans Memorial Stadium

1992 Wisconsin State University Conference football standings
	Conf.					Overall
Team	W		L		T	W		L		T
Wisconsin–La Crosse $^	6	–	0	–	1	12	–	0	–	1
Wisconsin–Whitewater	5	–	2	–	0	8	–	2	–	0
Wisconsin–River Falls	4	–	2	–	1	6	–	2	–	1
Wisconsin–Platteville	4	–	3	–	0	5	–	4	–	0
Wisconsin–Stevens Point	4	–	3	–	0	5	–	4	–	0
Wisconsin–Eau Claire	3	–	4	–	0	5	–	5	–	0
Wisconsin–Stout	1	–	6	–	0	2	–	7	–	0
Wisconsin–Oshkosh	0	–	7	–	0	1	–	8	–	0
Wisconsin–Superior	0	–	0	–	0	1	–	1	–	0
$ – Conference champion; ^ – NCAA Division III playoff participant

The 1992 Wisconsin–La Crosse Eagles football team was an American football team that represented the University of Wisconsin–La Crosse as a member of the Wisconsin State University Conference (WSUC) during the 1992 NCAA Division III football season. In their 24th season under head coach Roger Harring, the Eagles compiled a 12–0–1 record and won the WSUC championship. They advanced to the NCAA Division III playoffs, defeating Redlands in the first round, Central (Iowa) in the quarterfinals, Mount Union in the semifinals, and Washington & Jefferson in the Stagg Bowl to win the Division III national championship.

Harring suffered a heart attack on October 7. Longtime assistant coach Roland Christensen took over as interim head coach and led the team to a 5-0-1 record during Harring's illness. Harring and Christensen were named WSUC co-caches of the year. Nine La Crosse players received first-team honors on the All-WSUC honors: junior quarterback Jason Gonnion; junior running back John Janke; senior wide receiver Jason Janke; junior center Dave Bauer; sernior offensive guard Knute Brye; junior defensive tackle Rick Schaaf; senior linebacker Mike Breit; and senior cornerback Norris Thomas.

The team's statistical leaders included quarterback John Gonnion (127 of 219 passing for 1,904 yards), running back John Janke (692 rushing yards, 10 touchdowns), and wide receiver Jason Janke (52 receptions for 800 yards).

The team played its home games at Veterans Memorial Stadium in La Crosse, Wisconsin.

== Schedule ==
Date	Opponent	Site	Result	Attendance	Source
September 12	Winona State*	Veterans Memorial Stadium; La Crosse, WI	W 31–14	2,436	
September 19	at Wisconsin–Stevens Point	Stevens Point, WI	W 19–17	3,102	
September 26	Wisconsin–Platteville	Veterans Memorial Stadium; La Crosse, WI	W 35–7	1,973	
October 10	at St. Ambrose*	Davenport, IA	W 32–7	250	
October 17	at Wisconsin–River Falls	River Falls, WI	T 21–21	4,400	
October 24	Wisconsin–Eau Claire^{†}	Veterans Memorial Stadium; La Crosse, WI	W 35–7	3,076	
October 31	at Wisconsin–Oshkosh	Oshkosh, WI	W 40–14	900	
November 7	at Wisconsin–Whitewater	Warhawks Stadium; Whitewater, WI	W 13–3	4,795	
November 14	Wisconsin–Stout	Veterans Memorial Stadium; La Crosse, WI	W 43–9	3,369	
November 21	Redlands*	Veterans Memorial Stadium; La Crosse, WI (NCAA Division III first round)	W 47–26		
November 28	at Central (IA)*	Cyclone Stadium; Ames, IA (NCAA Division III quarterfinal)	W 34–9	1,000	
December 5	Mount Union*	Veterans Memorial Stadium; La Crosse, WI (NCAA Division III semifinal)	W 29–23	3,733	
December 11	vs. Washington & Jefferson*	Hawkins Stadium; Bradenton, FL (Stagg Bowl—NCAA Division III championship game)	W 16–12	5,329	
*Non-conference game; ^{†}Homecoming
