= Rick Coles =

American football player and coach (born 1957)

Current position
- Title: Associate head coach, offensive line coach
- Team: Ripon
- Conference: MWC

Biographical details
- Born: January 9, 1957; Coopersville, Michigan, U.S.

Playing career
- 1975–1978: Coe
- Position: Center

Coaching career (HC unless noted)
- 1979–1982: Osage HS (IA) (assistant)
- 1983–1984: Reinbeck HS (IA)
- 1985–1989: Coe (line)
- 1990–1992: Cornell (IA) (OC)
- 1993–1998: Lawrence
- 1999–2003: Ripon (line)
- 2004–2019: Ripon (OC)
- 2020–2022: Ripon (OL)
- 2023–present: Ripon (AHC/OL)

Head coaching record
- Overall: 16–39 (college)

Rick Coles (born January 9, 1957) is an American football coach and former player. He is as the offensive coordinator at Ripon College in Ripon, Wisconsin, a position he has held since 2004. Coles served as the head football coach at Lawrence University from 1993 to 1998, compiling a record of 16–39.

== Head coaching record ==
=== College ===
Year	Team	Overall	Conference	Standing	Bowl/playoffs
Lawrence Vikings (Midwest Conference) (1993–1998)
1993	Lawrence	2–7	2–3	T–4th (North)	
1994	Lawrence	2–7	1–4	T–5th (North)	
1995	Lawrence	4–5	2–3	4th (North)	
1996	Lawrence	2–7	2–3	4th (North)	
1997	Lawrence	4–5	2–3	T–3rd (North)	
1998	Lawrence	2–8	2–7	T–8th	
Lawrence:		16–39	11–23		
Total:		16–39			
