= 1991 Wisconsin–Whitewater Warhawks football team =

American college football season

1991 Wisconsin–Whitewater Warhawks football
- Conference: Wisconsin State University Conference
- Record: 6–4 (6–2 WSUC)
- Head coach: Bob Berezowitz (7th season)
- Offensive coordinator: Stan Zweifel (1st season)
- Home stadium: Warhawks Stadium

1991 Wisconsin State University Conference football standings
	Conf.					Overall
Team	W		L		T	W		L		T
Wisconsin–La Crosse $^	7	–	1	–	0	10	–	2	–	0
No. 20 Wisconsin–Stevens Point	6	–	2	–	0	6	–	3	–	1
Wisconsin–Whitewater	6	–	2	–	0	6	–	4	–	0
Wisconsin–Platteville	4	–	3	–	1	6	–	3	–	1
Wisconsin–Oshkosh	4	–	4	–	0	5	–	5	–	0
Wisconsin–Stout	3	–	5	–	0	5	–	5	–	0
Wisconsin–River Falls	2	–	5	–	1	4	–	5	–	1
Wisconsin–Superior	1	–	6	–	1	2	–	6	–	1
Wisconsin–Eau Claire	1	–	6	–	1	2	–	7	–	1
$ – Conference champion; ^ – NCAA Division III playoff participant; Rankings from NAIA Division II poll

The 1991 Wisconsin–Whitewater Warhawks football team represented the University of Wisconsin–Whitewater as a member of the Wisconsin State University Conference (WSUC) during the 1991 NCAA Division III football season. Led by seventh-year head coach Bob Berezowitz, the Warhawks compiled an overall record of 6–4 with a mark of 6–2 in conference play, tying for second place in the WSUC. Wisconsin–Whitewater played home games at Warhawks Stadium in Whitewater, Wisconsin.

== Schedule ==
Date	Opponent	Site	Result	Attendance
September 7	at St. Francis (IL)*	Joliet, IL	L 17–28	2,634
September 14	Wisconsin–Platteville	Warhawks Stadium; Whitewater, WI	W 21–6	4,032
September 21	at Wisconsin–Superior	Superior, WI	L 14–16	
September 28	at Wisconsin–Stevens Point	Goerke Field; Stevens Point, WI	L 10–16	
October 5	Wisconsin–Stout	Warhawks Stadium; Whitewater, WI	W 21–18	1,458
October 12	Saint Ambrose*	Warhawks Stadium; Whitewater, WI	L 27–29	4,179
October 19	at Wisconsin–River Falls	River Falls, WI	W 24–7	600
October 26	Wisconsin–Eau Claire	Warhawks Stadium; Whitewater, WI	W 26–6	1,154
November 2	at Wisconsin–La Crosse	Veterans Memorial Stadium; La Crosse, WI	W 25–14	1,359
November 9	Wisconsin–Oshkosh	Warhawks Stadium; Whitewater, WI	W 28–7	1,075
*Non-conference game
