= Jerry Clark (American football) =

American football player and sports coach (1932–2017)

Biographical details
- Born: February 27, 1932
- Died: July 30, 2017 (aged 85); Broomfield, Colorado, U.S.

Playing career

Football
- 1952–1953: Iowa
- Position: Guard

Coaching career (HC unless noted)

Football
- 1956: Grinnell HS (IA)
- 1957–1958: Mason City HS (IA)
- 1959–1986: Cornell (IA)

Basketball
- 1959–1971: Cornell (IA) (assistant)

Baseball
- 1981–1984: Cornell (IA)

Golf
- 1959–1974: Cornell (IA)

Head coaching record
- Overall: 159–85–1 (college football); 12–12–1 (high school football)

Accomplishments and honors

Championships
- Football; 6 MWC (1961, 1964, 1976, 1978, 1980, 1984); 2 MWC West Division (1976–1977); 1 MWC Red Division (1977); 3 MWC South Division (1982–1984)

Jerry Wayne Clark (February 27, 1932 – July 30, 2017) was an American football player and coach football, basketball, and baseball. He served as the head football coach at Cornell College in Mount Vernon, Iowa from 1959 to 1986, compiling a record of 159–85–1.

Clark attended the University of Iowa, where he played football as a guard in 1952 and 1953, before graduating in 1954. He coached football at Fort Carson in Colorado in 1954 and 1955 before returning to the state of Iowa to coach high school football. Clark led Grinnell High School to a record of 6–3 in 1956, before moving to Mason City High School, where he guided the Mohawks to a records of 2–5–1 in 1957 and 4–4 in 1958. Clark was also an assistant basketball coach at Cornell from 1959 to 1971, the school's head golf coach from 1959 to 1974, and the school's head baseball coach from 1981 to 1984.

Clark died in Broomfield, Colorado, on July 30, 2017, at the age of 85.

== Head coaching record ==
=== College football ===
Year	Team	Overall	Conference	Standing	Bowl/playoffs
Cornell Rams (Midwest Conference) (1959–1986)
1959	Cornell	7–1	7–1	2nd	
1960	Cornell	5–2–1	5–2–1	T–2nd	
1961	Cornell	6–2	6–2	T–1st	
1962	Cornell	2–6	2–6	T–7th	
1963	Cornell	5–3	5–3	T–3rd	
1964	Cornell	7–1	7–1	T–1st	
1965	Cornell	2–6	2–6	T–8th	
1966	Cornell	3–5	3–5	T–5th	
1967	Cornell	4–4	4–4	T–4th	
1968	Cornell	6–2	6–2	3rd	
1969	Cornell	4–5	4–5	T–6th	
1970	Cornell	4–5	3–5	6th	
1971	Cornell	6–3	5–3	T–3rd	
1972	Cornell	6–3	6–2	2nd	
1973	Cornell	3–6	2–6	8th	
1974	Cornell	5–4	4–3	4th	
1975	Cornell	7–2	6–2	T–2nd	
1976	Cornell	8–1	4–1	T–1st (West)	
1977	Cornell	8–1	5–0	1st (West)	
1978	Cornell	7–2	4–1	T–1st (Red)	
1979	Cornell	7–2	4–1	2nd (Red)	
1980	Cornell	8–1	7–1	T–1st	
1981	Cornell	6–3	5–3	5th	
1982	Cornell	7–3	5–0	1st (South)	
1983	Cornell	5–5	5–0	1st (South)	
1984	Cornell	8–2	6–1	T–1st (South)	
1985	Cornell	8–1	6–1	2nd (South)	
1986	Cornell	5–4	4–3	3rd (South)	
Cornell:		159–85–1	132–70–1		
Total:		159–85–1			
National championship Conference title Conference division title or championship game berth
