= 1992 NCAA Division III football season =

American college football season

- Regular season: August – November 1992
- Playoffs: November – December 1992
- National championship: Hawkins Stadium; Bradenton, FL
- Champion: Wisconsin–La Crosse

The 1992 NCAA Division III football season, part of the college football season organized by the NCAA at the Division III level in the United States, began in August 1992, and concluded with the NCAA Division III Football Championship, also known as the Stagg Bowl, in December 1992 at Hawkins Stadium in Bradenton, Florida. The Wisconsin–La Crosse Eagles won their first Division III championship by defeating the Washington & Jefferson Presidents, 16−12.

== Program and Conference Changes ==
- After Glassboro State College changed its name to Rowan College of New Jersey in 1992, the Glassboro State Profs became the Rowan Profs at the start of the 1992 season.
- The Atlantic Collegiate Football Conference folded after the 1991 season.
- The Freedom Football Conference began competition this year with eight members.
- The University of Wisconsin-Superior cancelled its season in September of 1992 after playing 2 games. They would not revive the program.

=== Conference changes ===
School	1991 Conference	1992 Conference
Carroll (WI)	CCIW	Midwest
Curry	NEFC	ECFC
Evansville	Mid-South (NAIA)	D-III Independent
Gallaudet	ACFC	D-III Independent
Hartwick	New Program	D-III Independent
Marist	ACFC	Liberty
Merchant Marine	Liberty	FFC
Nichols	NEFC	ECFC
Norwich	D-III Independent	FFC
Plymouth State	NEFC	FFC
Siena	ECFC	D-III Independent
St. Francis (PA)	ACFC	D-III Independent
St. John Fisher	ACFC	D-III Independent
Stony Brook	Liberty	FFC
Quincy	D-III Independent	IBFC (NAIA)
UMass Lowell	NEFC	FFC
Wagner	D-III Independent	Liberty
Western Connecticut	D-III Independent	FFC
WPI	D-III Independent	FFC

== Conference standings ==
1992 Association of Mideast Colleges football standings
	Conf.					Overall
Team	W		L		T	W		L		T
Thomas More $^	3	–	0	–	0	9	–	2	–	0
Defiance	2	–	1	–	0	9	–	1	–	0
Bluffton	1	–	2	–	0	1	–	8	–	0
Wilmington (OH)	0	–	3	–	0	2	–	8	–	0
$ – Conference champion; ^ – NCAA Division III playoff participant

1992 Centennial Conference football standings
	Conf.					Overall
Team	W		L		T	W		L		T
Dickinson $	5	–	1	–	1	8	–	2	–	1
Swarthmore	4	–	2	–	1	5	–	3	–	1
Gettysburg	4	–	3	–	0	6	–	4	–	0
Johns Hopkins	4	–	3	–	0	6	–	4	–	0
Western Maryland	4	–	3	–	0	5	–	5	–	0
Franklin & Marshall	3	–	4	–	0	5	–	5	–	0
Ursinus	2	–	5	–	0	4	–	6	–	0
Muhlenberg	1	–	6	–	0	1	–	8	–	1
$ – Conference champion

1992 College Conference of Illinois and Wisconsin football standings
	Conf.					Overall
Team	W		L		T	W		L		T
Illinois Wesleyan $^	7	–	0	–	0	10	–	1	–	0
Augustana (IL)	6	–	1	–	0	6	–	3	–	0
Wheaton (IL)	5	–	2	–	0	6	–	3	–	0
Millikin	4	–	3	–	0	4	–	5	–	0
Elmhurst	2	–	4	–	1	2	–	6	–	1
North Park	1	–	4	–	2	1	–	6	–	2
North Central (IL)	1	–	5	–	1	1	–	7	–	1
Carthage	0	–	7	–	0	0	–	9	–	0
$ – Conference champion; ^ – NCAA Division III playoff participant

1992 Eastern Collegiate Football Conference standings
	Conf.					Overall
Team	W		L		T	W		L		T
Bentley $	6	–	0	–	0	9	–	1	–	0
Nichols	4	–	1	–	1	7	–	1	–	1
Stonehill	4	–	1	–	1	6	–	2	–	1
Assumption	3	–	3	–	0	5	–	5	–	0
Western New England	1	–	5	–	0	4	–	6	–	0
Curry	1	–	5	–	0	2	–	6	–	0
MIT	1	–	5	–	0	1	–	7	–	0
$ – Conference champion

1992 Freedom Football Conference standings
	Conf.					Overall
Team	W		L		T	W		L		T
WPI $^	5	–	0	–	0	9	–	2	–	0
Merchant Marine	4	–	1	–	0	7	–	1	–	1
Plymouth State	4	–	1	–	1	4	–	4	–	1
UMass Lowell	2	–	3	–	1	4	–	4	–	1
Stony Brook	2	–	3	–	0	5	–	5	–	0
Norwich	2	–	4	–	0	3	–	6	–	0
Western Connecticut	2	–	4	–	0	2	–	8	–	0
Coast Guard	1	–	6	–	0	1	–	8	–	0
$ – Conference champion; ^ – NCAA Division III playoff participant

1992 Indiana Collegiate Athletic Conference football standings
	Conf.					Overall
Team	W		L		T	W		L		T
Wabash $	5	–	0	–	1	6	–	2	–	1
Hanover	4	–	2	–	0	6	–	4	–	0
DePauw	3	–	1	–	2	4	–	4	–	2
Anderson (IN)	3	–	3	–	0	5	–	5	–	0
Manchester	2	–	4	–	0	5	–	5	–	0
Rose–Hulman	2	–	4	–	0	4	–	6	–	0
Franklin (IN)	0	–	5	–	1	0	–	9	–	1
$ – Conference champion

1992 Iowa Conference football standings
	Conf.					Overall
Team	W		L		T	W		L		T
Central (IA) $^	8	–	0	–	0	11	–	1	–	0
Simpson (IA)	6	–	2	–	0	6	–	2	–	1
Loras	5	–	3	–	0	7	–	3	–	0
Upper Iowa	5	–	3	–	0	6	–	4	–	0
Wartburg	5	–	3	–	0	5	–	5	–	0
Luther	4	–	4	–	0	6	–	4	–	0
Buena Vista	2	–	6	–	0	2	–	7	–	0
William Penn	1	–	7	–	0	1	–	9	–	0
Dubuque	0	–	8	–	0	1	–	8	–	0
$ – Conference champion; ^ – NCAA Division III playoff participant

1992 Liberty Football Conference standings
	Conf.					Overall
Team	W		L		T	W		L		T
Wagner $	5	–	0	–	0	8	–	2	–	0
St. John's	3	–	2	–	0	5	–	5	–	0
C. W. Post	2	–	2	–	1	6	–	3	–	1
Marist	2	–	2	–	1	4	–	5	–	1
Iona	2	–	3	–	0	5	–	5	–	0
Pace	0	–	5	–	0	1	–	9	–	0
$ – Conference champion

1992 Michigan Intercollegiate Athletic Association football standings
	Conf.					Overall
Team	W		L		T	W		L		T
Albion $	5	–	0	–	0	8	–	1	–	0
Hope	4	–	1	–	0	6	–	3	–	0
Olivet	2	–	3	–	0	2	–	6	–	1
Adrian	2	–	3	–	0	2	–	7	–	0
Alma	1	–	4	–	0	3	–	6	–	0
Kalamazoo	1	–	4	–	0	3	–	6	–	0
$ – Conference champion

1992 Middle Atlantic Conference football standings
	Conf.					Overall
Team	W		L		T	W		L		T
Lycoming $^	7	–	0	–	1	8	–	1	–	1
Susquehanna	7	–	1	–	0	9	–	1	–	0
Lebanon Valley	5	–	3	–	0	7	–	3	–	0
Moravian	4	–	4	–	0	6	–	4	–	0
Wilkes	3	–	4	–	1	5	–	4	–	1
Juniata	3	–	4	–	1	3	–	6	–	1
Widener	3	–	4	–	1	3	–	6	–	1
Delaware Valley	2	–	6	–	0	3	–	7	–	0
Albright	0	–	8	–	0	0	–	10	–	0
$ – Conference champion; ^ – NCAA Division III playoff participant

1992 Midwest Conference football standings
	Conf.					Overall
Team	W		L		T	W		L		T
North Division
Beloit xy	4	–	1	–	0	6	–	3	–	0
Carroll (WI)	4	–	1	–	0	8	–	1	–	0
St. Norbert	3	–	2	–	0	4	–	5	–	0
Ripon	2	–	3	–	0	5	–	4	–	0
Lake Forest	1	–	4	–	0	3	–	6	–	0
Lawrence	1	–	4	–	0	2	–	7	–	0
South Division
Cornell (IA) xy$	5	–	0	–	0	10	–	0	–	0
Coe	4	–	1	–	0	8	–	1	–	0
Monmouth (IL)	3	–	2	–	0	5	–	4	–	0
Illinois College	2	–	3	–	0	5	–	4	–	0
Knox	1	–	4	–	0	2	–	7	–	0
Grinnell	0	–	5	–	0	0	–	9	–	0
Championship: Cornell (IA) 40, Beloit 14
$ – Conference champion; x – Division champion/co-champions; y – Championship game participant

1992 Minnesota Intercollegiate Athletic Conference football standings
	Conf.					Overall
Team	W		L		T	W		L		T
Carleton $^	8	–	1	–	0	9	–	2	–	0
Saint John's (MN)	7	–	1	–	1	8	–	1	–	1
Concordia–Moorhead	6	–	2	–	1	7	–	2	–	1
Hamline	5	–	4	–	0	6	–	4	–	0
Bethel (MN)	5	–	4	–	0	5	–	5	–	0
Gustavus Adolphus	4	–	5	–	0	4	–	6	–	0
St. Olaf	4	–	5	–	0	4	–	6	–	0
St. Thomas (MN)	3	–	6	–	0	3	–	7	–	0
Augsburg	2	–	7	–	0	3	–	7	–	0
Macalester	0	–	9	–	0	0	–	10	–	0
$ – Conference champion; ^ – NCAA Division III playoff participant

1992 New England Football Conference standings
	Conf.					Overall
Team	W		L		T	W		L		T
Bridgewater State $	8	–	0	–	0	9	–	1	–	1
Massachusetts Maritime	6	–	2	–	0	6	–	3	–	0
Maine Maritime	5	–	3	–	0	6	–	3	–	0
Westfield State	5	–	3	–	0	6	–	3	–	0
UMass–Boston	4	–	4	–	0	5	–	4	–	0
UMass Dartmouth	4	–	4	–	0	5	–	4	–	0
Framingham State	3	–	5	–	0	4	–	5	–	0
Worcester State	1	–	7	–	0	1	–	9	–	0
Fitchburg State	0	–	8	–	0	0	–	9	–	0
$ – Conference champion

1992 New England Small College Athletic Conference football standings
	Conf.					Overall
Team	W		L		T	W		L		T
Middlebury	7	–	1	–	0	7	–	1	–	0
Trinity (CT)	6	–	2	–	0	6	–	2	–	0
Williams	5	–	2	–	1	5	–	2	–	1
Colby	5	–	3	–	0	5	–	3	–	0
Hamilton	5	–	3	–	0	5	–	3	–	0
Wesleyan	4	–	4	–	0	4	–	4	–	0
Bowdoin	4	–	4	–	0	4	–	4	–	0
Tufts	3	–	4	–	1	3	–	4	–	1
Amherst	0	–	8	–	0	0	–	8	–	0
Bates	0	–	8	–	0	0	–	8	–	0
The NESCAC did not recognize an official conference champion until 2000

1992 New Jersey Athletic Conference football standings
	Conf.					Overall
Team	W		L		T	W		L		T
Rowan $^	6	–	0	–	0	12	–	1	–	0
Montclair State	5	–	1	–	0	6	–	3	–	0
William Paterson	4	–	2	–	0	8	–	2	–	0
Kean	3	–	3	–	0	6	–	3	–	1
Trenton State	2	–	4	–	0	3	–	7	–	0
Ramapo	1	–	5	–	0	1	–	8	–	0
Jersey City State	0	–	6	–	0	0	–	10	–	0
$ – Conference champion; ^ – NCAA Division III playoff participant

1992 North Coast Athletic Conference football standings
	Conf.					Overall
Team	W		L		T	W		L		T
Wittenberg $	8	–	0	–	0	8	–	1	–	1
Allegheny	7	–	1	–	0	8	–	2	–	0
Ohio Wesleyan	6	–	2	–	0	8	–	2	–	0
Denison	2	–	4	–	2	3	–	5	–	2
Wooster	2	–	4	–	1	3	–	6	–	1
Case Western Reserve*	1	–	3	–	2	2	–	6	–	2
Kenyon	2	–	5	–	1	2	–	6	–	2
Earlham	2	–	5	–	0	5	–	5	–	0
Oberlin	1	–	7	–	0	1	–	9	–	0
$ – Conference champion; * - Case Western Reserve held a dual confereence affiliation, playing a full conference schedule in both the NCAC and the UAA

1992 Ohio Athletic Conference football standings
	Conf.					Overall
Team	W		L		T	W		L		T
Mount Union $^	9	–	0	–	0	12	–	1	–	0
Baldwin–Wallace	7	–	2	–	0	8	–	2	–	0
John Carroll	7	–	2	–	0	8	–	2	–	0
Ohio Northern	5	–	4	–	0	6	–	4	–	0
Heidelberg	4	–	4	–	1	5	–	4	–	1
Otterbein	3	–	4	–	2	3	–	5	–	2
Muskingum	3	–	6	–	0	4	–	6	–	0
Marietta	3	–	6	–	0	3	–	6	–	1
Capital	1	–	7	–	1	2	–	7	–	1
Hiram	1	–	8	–	0	1	–	9	–	0
$ – Conference champion; ^ – NCAA Division III playoff participant

1992 Old Dominion Athletic Conference football standings
	Conf.					Overall
Team	W		L		T	W		L		T
Emory & Henry $^	5	–	0	–	0	11	–	1	–	0
Hampden–Sydney	3	–	2	–	0	6	–	4	–	0
Washington and Lee	2	–	3	–	0	5	–	4	–	0
Randolph–Macon	2	–	3	–	0	4	–	6	–	0
Bridgewater	2	–	3	–	0	3	–	7	–	0
Guilford	1	–	4	–	0	2	–	8	–	0
$ – Conference champion; ^ – NCAA Division III playoff participant

1992 Presidents' Athletic Conference football standings
	Conf.					Overall
Team	W		L		T	W		L		T
Washington & Jefferson $^	4	–	0	–	0	11	–	2	–	0
Grove City	3	–	1	–	0	5	–	4	–	0
Bethany (WV)	2	–	2	–	0	3	–	6	–	0
Waynesburg	1	–	3	–	0	2	–	7	–	0
Thiel	0	–	4	–	0	1	–	8	–	0
$ – Conference champion; ^ – NCAA Division III playoff participant

1992 Southern California Intercollegiate Athletic Conference football standings
	Conf.					Overall
Team	W		L		T	W		L		T
Redlands $^	6	–	0	–	0	8	–	2	–	0
La Verne	5	–	1	–	0	7	–	1	–	1
Occidental	3	–	3	–	0	5	–	4	–	0
Pomona-Pitzer	3	–	3	–	0	4	–	4	–	0
Cal Lutheran	2	–	4	–	0	3	–	6	–	0
Whittier	2	–	4	–	0	3	–	6	–	0
Claremont-Mudd	0	–	6	–	0	0	–	9	–	0
$ – Conference champion; ^ – NCAA Division III playoff participant

1992 Southern Collegiate Athletic Conference football standings
	Conf.					Overall
Team	W		L		T	W		L		T
Sewanee $	4	–	0	–	0	8	–	1	–	0
Millsaps	2	–	1	–	1	5	–	4	–	1
Centre	2	–	2	–	0	3	–	6	–	0
Rhodes	1	–	2	–	1	5	–	4	–	1
Trinity (TX)	0	–	4	–	0	2	–	8	–	0
$ – Conference champion

1992 University Athletic Association football standings
	Conf.					Overall
Team	W		L		T	W		L		T
Rochester (NY) $	4	–	0	–	0	8	–	1	–	0
Carnegie Mellon	3	–	1	–	0	7	–	2	–	0
Washington University	1	–	3	–	0	4	–	6	–	0
Case Western Reserve	1	–	3	–	0	2	–	6	–	2
Chicago	1	–	3	–	0	3	–	7	–	0
$ – Conference champion; * - Case Western Reserve held a dual affiliation and played a complete conference schedule in both the UAA and the NCAC

1992 Wisconsin State University Conference football standings
	Conf.					Overall
Team	W		L		T	W		L		T
Wisconsin–La Crosse $^	6	–	0	–	1	12	–	0	–	1
Wisconsin–Whitewater	5	–	2	–	0	8	–	2	–	0
Wisconsin–River Falls	4	–	2	–	1	6	–	2	–	1
Wisconsin–Platteville	4	–	3	–	0	5	–	4	–	0
Wisconsin–Stevens Point	4	–	3	–	0	5	–	4	–	0
Wisconsin–Eau Claire	3	–	4	–	0	5	–	5	–	0
Wisconsin–Stout	1	–	6	–	0	2	–	7	–	0
Wisconsin–Oshkosh	0	–	7	–	0	1	–	8	–	0
Wisconsin–Superior	0	–	0	–	0	1	–	1	–	0
$ – Conference champion; ^ – NCAA Division III playoff participant

1992 NCAA Division III independents football records
	Conf.			Overall
Team	W	L	T	W		L		T
Dayton ^		–		10	–	1	–	0
Aurora ^		–		9	–	1	–	0
Ithaca ^		–		9	–	2	–	0
RPI		–		8	–	2	–	0
Evansville		–		7	–	2	–	0
Saint Peter's		–		7	–	2	–	0
Saint Francis (PA)		–		8	–	2	–	1
Drake		–		7	–	2	–	1
San Diego		–		7	–	2	–	1
Buffalo State ^		–		7	–	3	–	0
UAB		–		7	–	3	–	0
Wesley		–		7	–	3	–	0
Union (NY)		–		6	–	3	–	0
Frostburg State		–		6	–	3	–	1
Gannon		–		6	–	3	–	1
Cortland		–		7	–	4	–	0
Albany		–		6	–	4	–	0
Duquesne		–		5	–	4	–	0
Mercyhurst		–		5	–	4	–	1
Davidson		–		5	–	5	–	0
Maryville (TN)		–		5	–	5	–	0
Fairleigh Dickinson–Florham		–		4	–	5	–	0
Ferrum		–		4	–	5	–	0
Alfred		–		4	–	6	–	0
Buffalo		–		4	–	6	–	0
Catholic University		–		4	–	6	–	0
Georgetown		–		4	–	6	–	0
St. John Fisher		–		4	–	6	–	0
Upsala		–		4	–	6	–	0
Hobart		–		4	–	6	–	0
Canisius		–		3	–	6	–	1
Colorado College		–		3	–	6	–	0
Menlo		–		3	–	6	–	0
St. Lawrence		–		3	–	6	–	0
Brockport		–		3	–	7	–	0
Charleston Southern		–		3	–	7	–	0
Kentucky Wesleyan		–		3	–	7	–	0
Salisbury State		–		2	–	7	–	0
Siena		–		2	–	7	–	0
Hartwick		–		1	–	7	–	0
Methodist		–		0	–	10	–	0
Gallaudet		–		0	–	10	–	0
^ – NCAA Division III playoff participant

== Conference champions ==
Conference champions
- Association of Mideast Colleges – Thomas More
- Centennial Conference – Dickinson
- College Conference of Illinois and Wisconsin – Illinois Wesleyan
- Freedom Football Conference – WPI
- Indiana Collegiate Athletic Conference – Wabash
- Iowa Intercollegiate Athletic Conference – Central College
- Michigan Intercollegiate Athletic Association – Albion
- Middle Atlantic Conference – Lycoming
- Midwest Collegiate Athletic Conference – Cornell (IA)
- Minnesota Intercollegiate Athletic Conference – Carleton
- New England Football Conference – Bridgewater State
- New Jersey State Athletic Conference – Rowan
- North Coast Athletic Conference – Wittenberg
- Ohio Athletic Conference – Mount Union
- Old Dominion Athletic Conference – Emory & Henry
- Presidents' Athletic Conference – Washington & Jefferson
- Southern California Intercollegiate Athletic Conference – Redlands
- Southern Collegiate Athletic Conference – Sewanee
- Texas Intercollegiate Athletic Association – Howard Payne
- University Athletic Association – Rochester
- Upper Midwest Athletic Conference – Mount Senario
- Wisconsin Intercollegiate Athletic Conference – Wisconsin–La Crosse

== Postseason ==
The 1992 NCAA Division III Football Championship playoffs were the 20th annual single-elimination tournament to determine the national champion of men's NCAA Division III college football. The championship Stagg Bowl game was held at Hawkins Stadium in Bradenton, Florida for the third, and final, time. Like the previous seven tournaments, this year's bracket featured sixteen teams.

=== Playoff bracket ===
Regionals; Campus Sites
Mount Union	27
Dayton	10
Illinois Wesleyan	21
Aurora	12
Central (IA)	20
Carleton	8
Wisconsin–La Crosse	47
Redlands	26
Emory & Henry	17
Thomas More	10
Washington & Jefferson	33
Lycoming	0
Rowan	41
WPI	14
Buffalo State	28
Ithaca	26

Quarterfinals; Campus Sites
Mount Union	49
Illinois Wesleyan	27
Central (IA)	9
Wisconsin–La Crosse	34
Emory & Henry	15
Washington & Jefferson	51
Rowan	28
Buffalo State	19

Semifinals; Campus Sites
Mount Union	24
Wisconsin–La Crosse	29
Washington & Jefferson	18
Rowan	13

National Championship Game; Hawkins Stadium; Bradenton, Florida
Wisconsin–La Crosse	16
Washington & Jefferson	12

== See also ==
- 1992 NCAA Division I-A football season
- 1992 NCAA Division I-AA football season
- 1992 NCAA Division II football season
