= 1991 NCAA Division III football season =

American college football season

- Regular season: August – November 1991
- Playoffs: November – December 1991
- National championship: Hawkins Stadium; Bradenton, FL
- Champion: Ithaca

The 1991 NCAA Division III football season, part of the college football season organized by the NCAA at the Division III level in the United States, began in August 1991, and concluded with the NCAA Division III Football Championship, also known as the Stagg Bowl, in December 1991 at Hawkins Stadium in Bradenton, Florida. The Ithaca Bombers won their third Division III championship by defeating the Dayton Flyers, 34−20.

== Conference changes and new programs ==
=== Name change ===
- New England Football Conference member Southeastern Massachusetts University and the University of Lowell both joined the UMass system before the season. The former football program hence changed from the Southeastern Massachusetts Corsairs to the UMass Dartmouth Corsairs, while the latter changed from the Lowell Chiefs became the UMass Lowell Chiefs.
- The Independent College Athletic Conference stopped sponsoring football in 1991, shortly before its rebrand to become the Empire Athletic Association.

=== Conference changes ===
School	1990 Conference	1991 Conference
Alfred	ICAC	D-III Independent
Bluffton	D-III Independent	AMC
Brooklyn	ACFC	Dropped Program
Cal Lutheran	D-II Independent	SCIAC
Charleston Southern	New Program	D-III Independent
Defiance	NAIA Independent	AMC
Hobart	ICAC	D-III Independent
Ithaca	ICAC	D-III Independent
RPI	ICAC	D-III Independent
Sacred Heart	New Program	D-III Independent
St. Lawrence	ICAC	D-III Independent
Siena	ACFC	ECFC
Taylor	Indiana	NAIA Independent
Thomas More	D-III Independent	AMC
UAB	New Program	D-III Independent
UC Santa Barbara	D-III Independent	D-II Independent
Wilmington (OH)	D-III Independent	AMC

== Conference standings ==
1991 Association of Mideast Colleges football standings
	Conf.					Overall
Team	W		L		T	W		L		T
Thomas More $	3	–	0	–	0	10	–	0	–	0
Defiance	2	–	1	–	0	8	–	2	–	0
Wilmington (OH)	1	–	2	–	0	1	–	9	–	0
Bluffton	0	–	3	–	0	1	–	8	–	0
$ – Conference champion

1991 Atlantic Collegiate Football Conference standings
	Conf.					Overall
Team	W		L		T	W		L		T
Saint Francis (PA) $	3	–	0	–	0	6	–	3	–	0
Marist	2	–	1	–	0	6	–	4	–	0
Gallaudet	1	–	2	–	0	1	–	7	–	1
St. John Fisher	0	–	3	–	0	0	–	9	–	0
$ – Conference champion

1991 Centennial Conference football standings
	Conf.					Overall
Team	W		L		T	W		L		T
Dickinson $^	7	–	0	–	0	9	–	1	–	0
Franklin & Marshall	5	–	2	–	0	6	–	4	–	0
Western Maryland	4	–	3	–	0	5	–	5	–	0
Johns Hopkins	3	–	4	–	0	5	–	4	–	1
Ursinus	3	–	4	–	0	5	–	5	–	0
Muhlenberg	3	–	4	–	0	3	–	7	–	0
Gettysburg	2	–	5	–	0	2	–	7	–	0
Swarthmore	1	–	6	–	0	2	–	7	–	0
$ – Conference champion; ^ – NCAA Division III playoff participant

1991 College Conference of Illinois and Wisconsin football standings
	Conf.					Overall
Team	W		L		T	W		L		T
Augustana (IL) $	7	–	1	–	0	8	–	1	–	0
Illinois Wesleyan	6	–	1	–	1	7	–	1	–	1
Wheaton (IL)	6	–	1	–	1	7	–	1	–	1
Millikin	5	–	3	–	0	6	–	3	–	0
Carroll (WI)	4	–	4	–	0	5	–	4	–	0
North Central (IL)	3	–	5	–	0	4	–	5	–	0
Carthage	2	–	6	–	0	3	–	6	–	0
Elmhurst	2	–	6	–	0	2	–	7	–	0
North Park	0	–	8	–	0	0	–	9	–	0
$ – Conference champion

1991 Eastern Collegiate Football Conference standings
	Conf.					Overall
Team	W		L		T	W		L		T
Stonehill $	5	–	0	–	0	5	–	4	–	0
Bentley	4	–	1	–	0	5	–	4	–	0
Siena	2	–	3	–	0	3	–	5	–	0
Western New England	2	–	3	–	0	3	–	5	–	0
MIT	1	–	4	–	0	1	–	7	–	0
Assumption	1	–	4	–	0	1	–	8	–	0
$ – Conference champion

1991 Indiana Collegiate Athletic Conference football standings
	Conf.					Overall
Team	W		L		T	W		L		T
Wabash $	5	–	1	–	0	7	–	2	–	0
No. 23 Hanover	4	–	2	–	0	7	–	3	–	0
DePauw	4	–	2	–	0	6	–	4	–	0
Anderson (IN)	4	–	2	–	0	5	–	5	–	0
Manchester	2	–	4	–	0	3	–	6	–	1
Rose–Hulman	2	–	4	–	0	3	–	7	–	0
Franklin (IN)	0	–	6	–	0	2	–	8	–	0
$ – Conference champion; Rankings from NAIA Division II poll

1991 Iowa Conference football standings
	Conf.					Overall
Team	W		L		T	W		L		T
Simpson (IA) $^	8	–	0	–	0	10	–	1	–	0
Central (IA)	7	–	1	–	0	8	–	1	–	0
Loras	5	–	3	–	0	7	–	3	–	0
Wartburg	5	–	3	–	0	6	–	4	–	0
Luther	5	–	3	–	0	5	–	4	–	0
Upper Iowa	2	–	6	–	0	2	–	8	–	0
William Penn	2	–	6	–	0	2	–	8	–	0
Dubuque	1	–	7	–	0	1	–	8	–	0
Buena Vista	1	–	7	–	0	1	–	9	–	0
$ – Conference champion; ^ – NCAA Division III playoff participant

1991 Liberty Football Conference standings
	Conf.					Overall
Team	W		L		T	W		L		T
St. John's $	4	–	1	–	0	6	–	4	–	0
Iona	3	–	1	–	1	7	–	2	–	1
C. W. Post	3	–	2	–	0	4	–	6	–	0
Stony Brook	2	–	3	–	0	6	–	4	–	0
Merchant Marine	1	–	3	–	1	2	–	6	–	1
Pace	1	–	4	–	0	2	–	8	–	0
$ – Conference champion

1991 Michigan Intercollegiate Athletic Association football standings
	Conf.					Overall
Team	W		L		T	W		L		T
Albion +^	4	–	0	–	1	8	–	1	–	1
Olivet +	4	–	0	–	1	7	–	1	–	1
Hope	2	–	3	–	0	5	–	4	–	0
Kalamazoo	2	–	3	–	0	5	–	4	–	0
Adrian	1	–	4	–	0	4	–	5	–	0
Alma	1	–	4	–	0	4	–	5	–	0
+ – Conference co-champions; ^ – NCAA Division III playoff participant

1991 Middle Atlantic Conference football standings
	Conf.					Overall
Team	W		L		T	W		L		T
Lycoming $^	8	–	0	–	0	10	–	1	–	0
Susquehanna ^	7	–	1	–	0	11	–	2	–	0
Moravian	5	–	3	–	0	7	–	3	–	0
Lebanon Valley	5	–	3	–	0	6	–	3	–	1
Albright	3	–	5	–	0	5	–	5	–	0
Delaware Valley	3	–	5	–	0	3	–	7	–	0
Juniata	3	–	5	–	0	3	–	7	–	0
Widener	2	–	6	–	0	3	–	7	–	0
Wilkes	0	–	8	–	0	1	–	9	–	0
$ – Conference champion; ^ – NCAA Division III playoff participant

1991 Midwest Conference football standings
	Conf.					Overall
Team	W		L		T	W		L		T
North Division
Beloit xy	4	–	0	–	0	9	–	1	–	0
Ripon	2	–	2	–	0	5	–	4	–	0
St. Norbert	2	–	2	–	0	4	–	5	–	0
Lawrence	2	–	2	–	0	3	–	6	–	0
Lake Forest	0	–	4	–	0	2	–	7	–	0
South Division
Coe xy$^	5	–	0	–	0	9	–	2	–	0
Cornell (IA)	4	–	1	–	0	7	–	2	–	0
Monmouth (IL)	3	–	2	–	0	4	–	5	–	0
Knox	2	–	3	–	0	3	–	6	–	0
Grinnell	1	–	4	–	0	2	–	7	–	0
Illinois College	0	–	5	–	0	2	–	7	–	0
Championship: Coe 26, Beloit 10
$ – Conference champion; x – Division champion/co-champions; y – Championship game participant; ^ – NCAA Division III playoff participant

1991 Minnesota Intercollegiate Athletic Conference football standings
	Conf.					Overall
Team	W		L		T	W		L		T
Saint John's (MN) $^	8	–	0	–	0	11	–	1	–	0
St. Olaf	6	–	2	–	0	7	–	2	–	0
Bethel (MN)	5	–	3	–	0	6	–	3	–	0
St. Thomas (MN)	5	–	3	–	0	6	–	3	–	0
Gustavus Adolphus	5	–	3	–	0	5	–	4	–	0
Hamline	4	–	4	–	0	5	–	4	–	0
Carleton	3	–	5	–	0	5	–	5	–	0
Concordia–Moorhead	3	–	5	–	0	3	–	6	–	0
Augsburg	1	–	7	–	0	2	–	7	–	0
Macalester	0	–	8	–	0	1	–	8	–	0
$ – Conference champion; ^ – NCAA Division III playoff participant

1991 New England Football Conference standings
	Conf.					Overall
Team	W		L		T	W		L		T
North Division
UMass Lowell xy$^	5	–	0	–	0	10	–	1	–	0
Plymouth State	3	–	2	–	0	6	–	2	–	1
Maine Maritime	3	–	2	–	0	5	–	3	–	0
UMass–Boston	2	–	3	–	0	4	–	5	–	0
Nichols	2	–	3	–	0	4	–	5	–	0
Curry	0	–	5	–	0	0	–	9	–	0
South Division
Bridgewater State xy	6	–	0	–	0	8	–	2	–	0
UMass Dartmouth	4	–	2	–	0	6	–	3	–	0
Massachusetts Maritime	4	–	2	–	0	6	–	3	–	0
Westfield State	3	–	3	–	0	4	–	6	–	0
Worcester State	2	–	4	–	0	3	–	7	–	0
Framingham State	1	–	5	–	0	2	–	6	–	0
Fitchburg State	1	–	5	–	0	2	–	7	–	0
Championship: UMass Lowell 10, Bridgewater State 7
$ – Conference champion; x – Division champion/co-champions; y – Championship game participant; ^ – NCAA Division III playoff participant

1991 New England Small College Athletic Conference football standings
	Conf.					Overall
Team	W		L		T	W		L		T
Trinity (CT)	6	–	0	–	1	6	–	1	–	1
Williams	7	–	1	–	0	7	–	1	–	0
Tufts	5	–	3	–	0	5	–	3	–	0
Colby	5	–	3	–	0	5	–	3	–	0
Hamilton	4	–	2	–	1	4	–	3	–	1
Bowdoin	4	–	3	–	0	4	–	4	–	0
Wesleyan	2	–	5	–	0	3	–	5	–	0
Middlebury	2	–	5	–	0	2	–	6	–	0
Amherst	0	–	6	–	1	0	–	7	–	1
Bates	0	–	7	–	1	0	–	7	–	1
The NESCAC did not recognize an official conference champion until 2000

1991 New Jersey Athletic Conference football standings
	Conf.					Overall
Team	W		L		T	W		L		T
Glassboro State $^	5	–	1	–	0	9	–	2	–	0
William Paterson	4	–	1	–	1	8	–	1	–	1
Ramapo	4	–	2	–	0	6	–	3	–	0
Trenton State	3	–	2	–	1	5	–	2	–	1
Montclair State	3	–	3	–	0	5	–	5	–	0
Kean	1	–	5	–	0	3	–	7	–	0
Jersey City State	0	–	6	–	0	0	–	9	–	1
$ – Conference champion; ^ – NCAA Division III playoff participant

1991 North Coast Athletic Conference football standings
	Conf.					Overall
Team	W		L		T	W		L		T
Allegheny $^	7	–	0	–	0	11	–	1	–	0
Case Western Reserve*	5	–	1	–	0	7	–	3	–	0
Ohio Wesleyan	6	–	2	–	0	8	–	2	–	0
Wittenberg	5	–	3	–	0	5	–	5	–	0
Kenyon	3	–	4	–	0	5	–	5	–	0
Denison	3	–	4	–	0	3	–	7	–	0
Wooster	3	–	5	–	0	3	–	7	–	0
Earlham	1	–	6	–	0	1	–	8	–	0
Oberlin	0	–	8	–	0	0	–	9	–	0
$ – Conference champion; ^ – NCAA Division III playoff participant; * - Case Western Reserve held a dual confereence affiliation, playing a full conference schedule in both the NCAC and the UAA

1991 Ohio Athletic Conference football standings
	Conf.					Overall
Team	W		L		T	W		L		T
Baldwin–Wallace $^	9	–	0	–	0	10	–	1	–	0
Mount Union	7	–	1	–	1	8	–	1	–	1
Muskingum	6	–	3	–	0	7	–	3	–	0
John Carroll	5	–	2	–	2	5	–	3	–	2
Capital	5	–	3	–	1	6	–	3	–	1
Heidelberg	4	–	4	–	1	4	–	5	–	1
Ohio Northern	3	–	5	–	1	3	–	6	–	1
Otterbein	2	–	7	–	0	2	–	8	–	0
Hiram	1	–	8	–	0	1	–	9	–	0
Marietta	0	–	9	–	0	0	–	10	–	0
$ – Conference champion; ^ – NCAA Division III playoff participant

1991 Old Dominion Athletic Conference football standings
	Conf.					Overall
Team	W		L		T	W		L		T
Guilford $	4	–	1	–	0	8	–	2	–	0
Emory & Henry	4	–	1	–	0	8	–	2	–	0
Hampden–Sydney	3	–	2	–	0	7	–	2	–	1
Randolph–Macon	3	–	2	–	0	4	–	6	–	0
Bridgewater	1	–	4	–	0	2	–	8	–	0
Washington and Lee	0	–	5	–	0	1	–	9	–	0
$ – Conference champion; Guilford won the conference title by virtue of a head-to-head win over Emory & Henry.

1991 Presidents' Athletic Conference football standings
	Conf.					Overall
Team	W		L		T	W		L		T
Washington & Jefferson $^	4	–	0	–	0	8	–	2	–	0
Waynesburg	3	–	1	–	0	6	–	3	–	0
Thiel	2	–	2	–	0	5	–	4	–	0
Grove City	1	–	3	–	0	3	–	6	–	0
Bethany (WV)	0	–	4	–	0	2	–	7	–	0
$ – Conference champion; ^ – NCAA Division III playoff participant

1991 Southern California Intercollegiate Athletic Conference football standings
	Conf.					Overall
Team	W		L		T	W		L		T
Redlands $	5	–	0	–	0	7	–	2	–	0
La Verne	4	–	1	–	0	7	–	2	–	0
Occidental	3	–	2	–	0	5	–	4	–	0
Whittier	2	–	3	–	0	3	–	6	–	0
Pomona-Pitzer	1	–	4	–	0	2	–	6	–	0
Claremont-Mudd	0	–	5	–	0	0	–	9	–	0
Cal Lutheran*	0	–	0	–	0	5	–	5	–	0
$ – Conference champion; * - Ineligible for conference title

1991 Southern Collegiate Athletic Conference football standings
	Conf.					Overall
Team	W		L		T	W		L		T
Millsaps $	3	–	1	–	0	7	–	2	–	0
Sewanee	2	–	1	–	1	7	–	1	–	1
Rhodes	2	–	1	–	1	6	–	2	–	1
Centre	2	–	2	–	0	5	–	5	–	0
Trinity (TX)	0	–	4	–	0	1	–	9	–	0
$ – Conference champion

1991 University Athletic Association football standings
	Conf.					Overall
Team	W		L		T	W		L		T
Carnegie Mellon $	4	–	0	–	0	9	–	1	–	0
Rochester (NY)	3	–	1	–	0	7	–	3	–	0
Case Western Reserve*	2	–	2	–	0	7	–	3	–	0
Washington (MO)	1	–	3	–	0	6	–	4	–	0
Chicago	0	–	4	–	0	0	–	10	–	0
$ – Conference champion; * - Case Western Reserve held a dual affiliation and played a complete conference schedule in both the UAA and the NCAC

1991 Wisconsin State University Conference football standings
	Conf.					Overall
Team	W		L		T	W		L		T
Wisconsin–La Crosse $^	7	–	1	–	0	10	–	2	–	0
No. 20 Wisconsin–Stevens Point	6	–	2	–	0	6	–	3	–	1
Wisconsin–Whitewater	6	–	2	–	0	6	–	4	–	0
Wisconsin–Platteville	4	–	3	–	1	6	–	3	–	1
Wisconsin–Oshkosh	4	–	4	–	0	5	–	5	–	0
Wisconsin–Stout	3	–	5	–	0	5	–	5	–	0
Wisconsin–River Falls	2	–	5	–	1	4	–	5	–	1
Wisconsin–Superior	1	–	6	–	1	2	–	6	–	1
Wisconsin–Eau Claire	1	–	6	–	1	2	–	7	–	1
$ – Conference champion; ^ – NCAA Division III playoff participant; Rankings from NAIA Division II poll

1991 NCAA Division III independents football records
	Conf.			Overall
Team	W	L	T	W		L		T
Dayton ^		–		13	–	1	–	0
Ithaca ^		–		12	–	1	–	0
Union (NY) ^		–		10	–	1	–	0
Buffalo State		–		9	–	2	–	0
Wesley		–		9	–	2	–	0
Ferrum		–		7	–	2	–	0
Alfred		–		7	–	3	–	0
Cortland		–		7	–	3	–	0
Frostburg State		–		7	–	3	–	0
Maryville (TN)		–		7	–	3	–	0
San Diego		–		7	–	3	–	0
WPI		–		7	–	3	–	0
Coast Guard		–		6	–	3	–	0
Aurora		–		5	–	3	–	1
Georgetown		–		6	–	4	–	0
St. Lawrence		–		6	–	4	–	0
Upsala		–		6	–	4	–	0
Mercyhurst		–		5	–	4	–	0
UAB		–		4	–	3	–	2
Albany		–		5	–	5	–	0
Brockport		–		5	–	5	–	0
Catholic University		–		5	–	5	–	0
Saint Peter's		–		4	–	4	–	0
Wagner		–		5	–	5	–	0
Davidson		–		4	–	5	–	0
RPI		–		4	–	5	–	0
Drake		–		4	–	6	–	0
Colorado College		–		3	–	6	–	0
Buffalo		–		3	–	7	–	0
Charleston Southern		–		3	–	7	–	0
Gannon		–		3	–	7	–	0
Quincy		–		3	–	7	–	0
Hobart		–		3	–	7	–	0
Canisius		–		2	–	7	–	0
Fairleigh Dickinson–Florham		–		2	–	7	–	0
Menlo		–		2	–	7	–	0
Kentucky Wesleyan		–		2	–	8	–	0
Methodist		–		2	–	8	–	0
Norwich		–		2	–	8	–	0
Salisbury State		–		1	–	9	–	0
Western Connecticut State		–		1	–	9	–	0
Duquesne		–		0	–	9	–	0
^ – NCAA Division III playoff participant

== Conference champions ==
Conference champions
- Association of Mideast Colleges – Thomas More
- Centennial Conference – Dickinson
- College Conference of Illinois and Wisconsin – Augustana (IL)
- Indiana Collegiate Athletic Conference – Wabash
- Iowa Intercollegiate Athletic Conference – Simpson
- Michigan Intercollegiate Athletic Association – Albion
- Middle Atlantic Conference – Lycoming
- Midwest Collegiate Athletic Conference – Coe
- Minnesota Intercollegiate Athletic Conference – Saint John's (MN)
- New England Football Conference – Massachusetts–Lowell
- New Jersey State Athletic Conference – Glassboro State
- North Coast Athletic Conference – Allegheny
- Ohio Athletic Conference – Baldwin Wallace
- Old Dominion Athletic Conference – Guilford
- Presidents' Athletic Conference – Washington & Jefferson
- Southern California Intercollegiate Athletic Conference – Redlands
- Southern Collegiate Athletic Conference – Millsaps
- Texas Intercollegiate Athletic Association – Midwestern State
- University Athletic Association – Carnegie Mellon
- Upper Midwest Athletic Conference – Concordia–St. Paul
- Wisconsin Intercollegiate Athletic Conference – Wisconsin–La Crosse

== Postseason ==
The 1991 NCAA Division III Football Championship playoffs were the 19th annual single-elimination tournament to determine the national champion of men's NCAA Division III college football. The championship Stagg Bowl game was held at Hawkins Stadium in Bradenton, Florida for the second time. Like the previous six tournaments, this year's bracket featured sixteen teams.

=== Playoff bracket ===
Regionals; Campus Sites
Ithaca	31
Glassboro State	10
Union (NY)	55
UMass–Lowell	16
Lycoming	18
Washington & Jefferson	16
Susquehanna	21
Dickinson	20
Saint John's (MN)	75
Coe	2
Wisconsin–La Crosse	28
Simpson	13
Allegheny	24*
Albion	21
Dayton	27
Baldwin–Wallace	10

Quarterfinals; Campus Sites
Ithaca	35
Union (NY)	23
Lycoming	24
Susquehanna	31
Saint John's (MN)	29
Wisconsin–La Crosse	10
Allegheny	25
Dayton	28*

Semifinals; Campus Sites
Ithaca	49
Susquehanna	13
Saint John's (MN)	7
Dayton	19

National Championship Game; Hawkins Stadium; Bradenton, Florida
Ithaca	34
Dayton	20

== See also ==
- 1991 NCAA Division I-A football season
- 1991 NCAA Division I-AA football season
- 1991 NCAA Division II football season
