= Siena Saints football =

Defunct football team that represented Siena College in New York, USA

- First season: 1965
- Last season: 2003; 23 years ago
- Location: Colonie, New York
- Stadium: Heritage Park (capacity: 5,500)
- NCAA division: Division I-AA
- Conference: Metro Atlantic Athletic Conference
- Colors: Green and gold
- All-time record: 125–215–3 (.369)
- Bowl record: 0–0 (–)

National championships
- Claimed: 0

Conference championships
- 0

Conference division championships
- 0

For information on all Siena College sports, see Siena Saints

The Siena Saints football (formerly the Siena Indians) program was the intercollegiate American football team for Siena College located in Loudonville, New York. The team competed in the NCAA Division I-AA and were members of the Metro Atlantic Athletic Conference. The school's first football team was fielded in 1965. Siena participated in football from 1965 to 2003, compiling an all-time record of 124–215–3. On January 21, 2004, Siena announced it was discontinuing its D I-AA football program. The discontinuation of the football program saved $200,000 from the school Athletic Department's annual budget, which was reallocated into other areas within the Athletic Department.

== Head coaches ==
Tenure	Coach	Record	Pct.
1965–1966	Steve Glynn	3–8	.272
1967–1971	Art Cardi	27–13–1	.671
1972–1974	Dick Hallock	6–18–1	.260
1975–1980	Ken Ralston	17–28–1	.380
1981	Dave Lucaroni	3–5	.375
1982–1995	Jack DuBois	49–85	.366
1996–1998	Ed Zaloom	12–16	.429
1999	Chris Schultz	3–7	.300
2000–2003	Jay Bateman	5–35	.125
Totals	9 coaches	125–215–3	.369

== Notable former players ==
- Ron James
- Jeff Hafley
- Casey McCanta
- Brian Gabriel
