= Menlo Oaks =

Intercollegiate sports teams of Menlo College

- University: Menlo College
- Nickname: Oaks
- NCAA: Division II
- Conference: CCAA (primary); MPSF (men's volleyball, men's and women's wrestling)
- Athletic director: Keith Spataro
- Location: Atherton, California
- Varsity teams: 23 (9 men's, 9 women's, 5 co-ed)
- Basketball arena: Haynes-Prim Pavilion
- Baseball stadium: Cartan Field
- Softball stadium: Wunderlich Field
- Colors: Blue and gray
- Website: menloathletics.com

The Menlo Oaks are the athletic teams that represent Menlo College, located in Atherton, California, in intercollegiate sports as a member of NCAA Division II and the California Collegiate Athletic Association since the 2026–27 academic year, while its men's & women's wrestling and men's volleyball teams compete in the Mountain Pacific Sports Federation (MPSF). The Oaks previously competed as a member of the National Association of Intercollegiate Athletics (NAIA), primarily competing in the California Pacific Conference (Cal Pac) from 1996–2015 and the Golden State Athletic Conference (GSAC) from 2015–2024. Menlo also previously competed in the Pacific West Conference from 2024–2026.

The college provides competitive activities for men and women enrolled at the college.

== Varsity teams ==
Menlo competes in 23 intercollegiate varsity sports: Men's varsity sports include baseball, basketball, cross country, golf, soccer, tennis, distance track, volleyball and wrestling; while women's varsity sports include basketball, cross country, golf, soccer, softball, tennis, distance track, volleyball and wrestling; and co-ed sports include competitive cheer, competitive dance, eSports, rowing, and weightlifting.

=== Football ===
Originally a junior college program, the Menlo Oaks football team played at the four-year level from 1986 to 2014. On February 1, 2015, the Menlo Board of Trustees voted to end the college's football program and cited financial viability issues as a major reason.

Three former Menlo players at Menlo played in the NFL, Burt Delavan, Nate Jackson, and Kaulana Park.

From 2006 to 2010, Menlo played in the Northwest Conference (NWC), an NCAA Division III athletic conference. From 2011 to 2014, Menlo was an NAIA independent school.
