= Brautigam =

Brautigam or Bräutigam is a surname. Notable people with the surname include:

- Alois Bräutigam (1916–2007), German-Czech politician
- Deborah Bräutigam, American political scientist
- Harry Brautigam (1948–2008), Nicaraguan economist
- Helmut Bräutigam (1914–1942), German composer
- Johan Brautigam (1878–1962), Dutch trade unionist
- Otto Bräutigam (1895–1992), German diplomat
- Perry Bräutigam (born 1963), German footballer and coach
- Ronald Brautigam (born 1954), Dutch pianist
- Vince Brautigam, American football coach
- Volker Bräutigam (1939–2022), German composer and church musician

== See also ==
- Brautigan (surname), another surname
