= John Chalmers (coach) =

American sports coach (1874–1962)

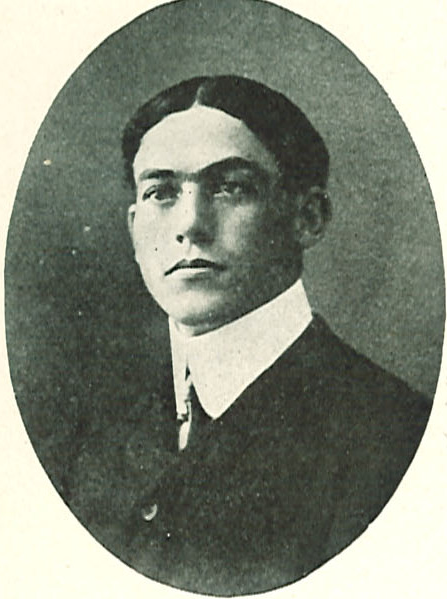
- Chalmers from 1905 Hawkeye

Biographical details
- Born: August 17, 1874; Downsville, New York, U.S.
- Died: June 8, 1962 (aged 87); Dubuque, Iowa, U.S.

Playing career

Football
- 1900: Lafayette

Coaching career (HC unless noted)

Football
- 1901: Dubuque HS (IA)
- 1902: Franklin & Marshall
- 1903–1905: Iowa
- 1906: Iowa (assistant)
- 1907–1913: St. Joseph's (IA)
- 1914–1924: Dubuque

Basketball
- 1904–1905: Iowa
- 1915–1917: Dubuque

Baseball
- 1903: Franklin & Marshall
- 1904–1905: Iowa
- 1915–1921: Dubuque

Head coaching record
- Overall: 100–47–8 (college football); 16–15 (college basketball)

John George Chalmers (August 17, 1874 – June 8, 1962) was an American football, basketball, and baseball coach. He served as the head football coach at Franklin & Marshall College (1902), the University of Iowa (1903–1905), Columbia College in Dubuque, Iowa, now known as Loras College, (1907–1914), and the University of Dubuque (1914–1924), compiling a career college football record of 100–47–8. Chalmers was also the head men's basketball coach at Iowa for one season (1904–1905), tallying a mark of 6–8, and the baseball coach at Iowa for two seasons (1904–1905) and at Columbia College from 1915 to 1921.

== Background ==
Born in Downsville, New York, Chalmers was one of the most successful athletes in Lafayette College history. He graduated in 1902. In 1901, his coaching career began at Dubuque High School in Dubuque, Iowa. He led the Dubuque High School football team to the state title in the championship game against West Des Moines High School, winning by a score of 12–0. Chalmers then served as athletic director at Franklin & Marshall College for a year before being hired to replace Alden Knipe as head football coach at the University of Iowa in 1903.

== Coaching career ==
=== Franklin & Marshall ===
Chalmers was the head football coach at Franklin & Marshall College in Lancaster, Pennsylvania for one season in the 1902 season, compiling a record of 7–2. He was hired from Lafayette College to replace John C. Hedges who had resigned the previous year.

=== Iowa ===
Iowa had a 9–2 record in 1903 under Chalmers. Those nine wins were a school record that stood for 82 years. The record was tied in 1956 and 1983, but it was not until 1985 that an Iowa team surpassed Chalmers' nine wins in 1903.

The highlight of the 1903 season was a home victory over Illinois. The Hawkeyes had not yet won a home game against a Western Conference opponent, and Illinois had humiliated the Hawkeyes 80-0 in 1902. But the Hawkeyes pulled out a 12–0 victory in 1903, Iowa's first conference victory since 1900.

Iowa had a 7–4 record in 1904 and an 8–2 record in 1905. The 1905 team was led by captain Earle McGowan, one of the most prolific scorers in Hawkeye history. He scored 114 points in 1905, and the 1905 Hawkeyes shut out seven of their ten opponents. But losses to Minnesota and Chicago kept Iowa in the cellar in the Western Conference.

Chalmers served as Iowa's basketball coach during the 1904–1905 season, coaching the team to a 6–8 record. He also coached baseball at Iowa for two years in 1904 and 1905. Chalmers wanted to leave the university after the 1905 football season and begin his law practice in Dubuque. However, school officials convinced him to stay for one more year. Mark Catlin from the University of Chicago, the heir apparent to Chalmers as head coach, was hired that season to assist Chalmers. Although Catlin was actually an assistant coach, many Iowa records consider Catlin, not Chalmers, the official coach of the 1906 Hawkeyes.

The Western Conference meetings of 1905 led to two significant rule changes. Conference members were not allowed to play more than five games per season. Also, freshmen were now ineligible, and players were allowed a maximum of three years of eligibility. These rule changes were made in response to growing criticism over player injuries and deaths during games at that time.

These changes greatly hampered play in 1906. Conference players who were to be seniors were all ruled ineligible, because they had already played three years of competition. Players who were to be freshmen also sat out. Only players who were to be sophomores and juniors were allowed to play.

Iowa finished with a 2–3 record in 1906. Coaches Chalmers and Catlin worked well together but had contrasting coaching styles. Chalmers learned the eastern style of play at Lafayette, coaching players as individuals and devising conservative schemes to maximize their talents. Catlin learned the western style of play from Amos Alonzo Stagg at Chicago, coaching schemes rather than players and advocating an open, aggressive style.

Chalmers left Iowa with a record of 24–8 over three years. Official records indicate that he has the highest winning percentage of any Hawkeye coach that coached more than one year. However, Iowa won just one Western Conference game with Chalmers, the 1903 victory over Illinois.

=== Columbia and Dubuque ===
Chalmers left Iowa for Dubuque in 1907. He set up his law practice, and he also became the first ever football coach at Columbia College. He coached Columbia from 1907 to 1914, compiling a 28–16–4 record. His 28 wins for official Columbia football squads has only been surpassed by Bob Bierie.

Chalmers, who considered coaching to be an enjoyable hobby, then became the first football coach in the history of the University of Dubuque. He coached football at that school from 1914 to 1924 and was also their first baseball coach from 1915 to 1921. The University of Dubuque has named their football field "Chalmers Field" in honor of him. In 1992, Chalmers was inducted into the University of Dubuque Athletic Hall of Fame.

== Legal career ==
Chalmers was a prominent lawyer and later a judge in Dubuque for 56 years.

== Head coaching record ==
=== College football ===
Year	Team	Overall	Conference	Standing	Bowl/playoffs
Franklin & Marshall (Independent) (1902)
1902	Franklin & Marshall	7–2			
Franklin & Marshall:		7–2			
Iowa Hawkeyes (Western Conference) (1903–1905)
1903	Iowa	9–2	1–1	5th	
1904	Iowa	7–4	0–3	T–7th	
1905	Iowa	8–2	0–2	T–7th	
Iowa:		24–8	1–6		
St. Joseph's (Independent) (1907–1913)
St. Joseph's:		28–16–4			
Dubuque Spartans (Independent) (1914–1915)
1914	Dubuque	1–1			
1915	Dubuque	7–0			
Dubuque Spartans (Hawkeye College Conference) (1916–1917)
1916	Dubuque	5–1			
1917	Dubuque	5–0–1			
Dubuque Spartans (Independent) (1918–1924)
1918	Dubuque	2–1			
1919	Dubuque	6–1			
1920	Dubuque	4–1–1			
1921	Dubuque	4–2–1			
1922	Dubuque	3–4			
1923	Dubuque	3–4–1			
1924	Dubuque	1–6			
Dubuque:		49–21–4			
Total:		100–47–8			
