= Ryan Maiuri =

American football coach (born c. 1983)

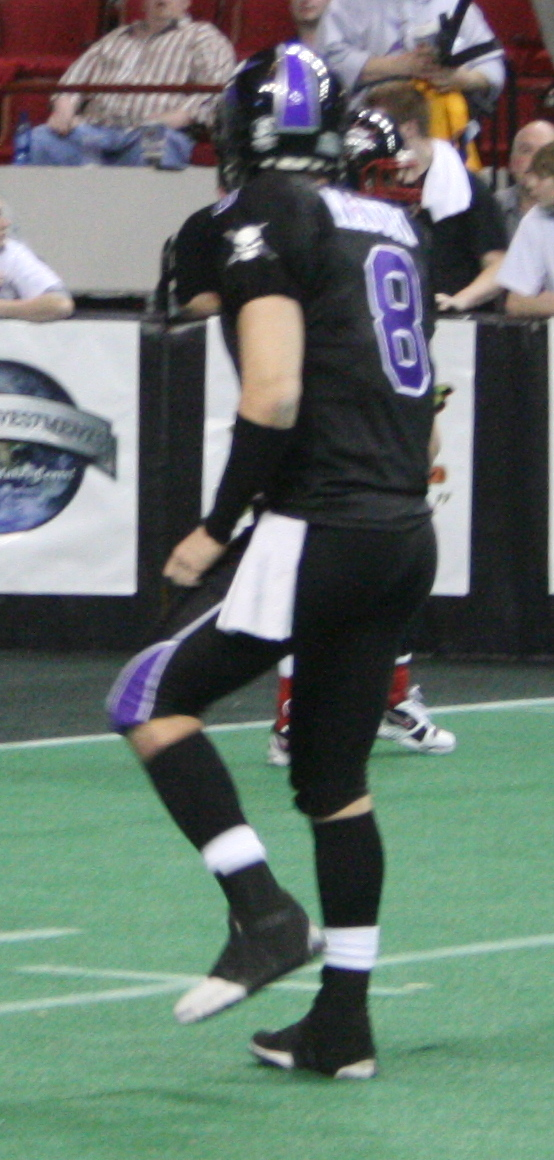
- Maiuri with the Milwaukee Bonecrushers in 2008.

Current position
- Title: Head coach
- Team: Dubuque
- Conference: ARC
- Record: 15–15

Biographical details
- Born: c. 1983 (age 42–43); Sterling Heights, Michigan, U.S.
- Education: Lakeland College (2006, 2008); University of Minnesota (2014)

Playing career
- 2002–2005: Lakeland
- 2006: Hamburg Blue Devils
- 2008: RiverCity Rage
- 2008: Milwaukee Bonecrushers
- 2011: La Crosse Spartans
- Position: Quarterback

Coaching career (HC unless noted)
- 2007–2008: Lakeland (GA)
- 2010 (spring): La Crosse Spartans (OC)
- 2010: Winona State (TE)
- 2011: Adrian (QB)
- 2012–2014: Minnesota (GA)
- 2015–2022: Central (IA) (OC/QB)
- 2023: Central (IA) (AHC/OC/QB)
- 2024–present: Dubuque

Head coaching record
- Overall: 15–15

Ryan Maiuri (born c. 1983) is an American football coach. He is the head football coach for the University of Dubuque, a position he has held since 2024. He also coached for Lakeland, Winona State, Adrian, Minnesota, Central (IA), and the La Crosse Spartans of the Indoor Football League (IFL). He played college football for Lakeland as a quarterback and professionally for the Hamburg Blue Devils of the German Football League (GFL), the RiverCity Rage of the United Indoor Football (UIF), and the Milwaukee Bonecrushers of the Continental Indoor Football League (CIFL), and the La Crosse Spartans of the IFL.

== Coaching career ==
=== Dubuque ===
Maiuri was named the program's 21st head football coach on December 28, 2023, replacing long time head coach Stan Zweifel. He opened his tenure with a loss to #15 Aurora 33-21.

== Head coaching record ==
| Year | Team | Overall | Conference | Standing | Bowl/playoffs |
|---|---|---|---|---|---|
Dubuque Spartans (American Rivers Conference) (2024–present)
| 2024 | Dubuque | 5–5 | 5–3 | 4th | |
| 2025 | Dubuque | 4–6 | 4–4 | 5th | |
| 2026 | Dubuque | 6–4 | 5–2 | 3rd | |
| Dubuque: | | 15–15 | 14–9 | | |
| Total: | | 15–15 | | | |
