= 2015 NCAA Division III football rankings =

- Season: 2015
- Postseason: Single-elimination
- Preseason No. 1: Wisconsin–Whitewater
- National champions: Mount Union
- Conferences with most teams in final poll: OAC, WIAC (3)

Two human polls and a committee's selections comprise the 2015 National Collegiate Athletic Association (NCAA) Division III football rankings. Unlike in Division I's Football Bowl Subdivision (FBS), the NCAA, Division III college football's governing body, bestows a national championship on the winner of the Stagg Bowl – the championship round of a 32-team postseason tournament. The main weekly poll that begins in the preseason is the D3football.com, poll which ranks the top 25 colleges in Division III football. Another weekly poll starting in the preseason is the BennetRank. One additional poll is released midway through the season, the AFCA Division III Coaches Poll.

== Legend ==
	Increase in ranking
	Decrease in ranking
	Not ranked previous week
	Selected for Division III Football Championship Playoffs
(#–#)	Win–loss record
(Italics)	Number of first place votes
т	Tied with team above or below also with this symbol

== D3football.com poll ==
	Preseason Jul 13	Week 1 Sep 5	Week 2 Sep 13	Week 3 Sep 20	Week 4 Sep 27	Week 5 Oct 4	Week 6 Oct 11	Week 7 Oct 18	Week 8 Oct 25	Week 9 Nov 1	Week 10 Nov 8	Week 11 Nov 15	Final Dec 21	
1.	Wisconsin–Whitewater (18)	Wisconsin–Whitewater (0–0) (19)	Wisconsin–Whitewater (1–0) (19)	Wisconsin–Whitewater (2–0) (19)	Wisconsin–Whitewater (3–0) (21)	Wisconsin–Whitewater (4–0) (21)	Mount Union (5–0) (19)	Mount Union (6–0) (19)	Mount Union (7–0) (19)	Mount Union (8–0) (19)	Mount Union (9–0) (19)	Mount Union (10–0) (19)	Mount Union (15–0) (25)	1.
2.	Mount Union (6)	Mount Union (1–0) (4)	Mount Union (1–0) (4)	Mount Union (2–0) (4)	Mount Union (3–0) (2)	Mount Union (4–0) (2)	Linfield (4–0) (6)	Linfield (5–0) (6)	Linfield (6–0) (6)	Linfield (7–0) (6)	Linfield (8–0) (6)	Linfield (9–0) (6)	St. Thomas (MN) (14–1)	2.
3.	Linfield (1)	Linfield (0–0) (2)	Linfield (1–0) (2)	Linfield (2–0) (2)	Linfield (2–0) (2)	Linfield (3–0) (2)	Mary Hardin-Baylor (5–0)	Mary Hardin-Baylor (6–0)	Mary Hardin-Baylor (7–0)	Wisconsin–Oshkosh (7–1)	Wisconsin–Oshkosh (8–1)	Wisconsin–Oshkosh (9–1)	Linfield (12–1)	3.
4.	Mary Hardin–Baylor	Mary Hardin–Baylor (1–0)	Mary Hardin–Baylor (2–0)	Mary Hardin–Baylor (3–0)	Mary Hardin–Baylor (3–0)	Mary Hardin–Baylor (4–0)	Wesley (5–0)	Wesley (6–0)	Wesley (7–0)	Wesley (8–0)	St. Thomas (MN) (9–0)	St. Thomas (MN) (10–0)	Wisconsin–Whitewater (12–2)	4.
5.	Wesley	Wesley (0–0)	Wesley (1–0)	Wesley (2–0)	Wesley (3–0)	Wesley (3–0)	Wisconsin–Oshkosh (4–1)	Wisconsin–Oshkosh (5–1)	Wisconsin–Oshkosh (6–1)	St. Thomas (MN) (8–0)	Wheaton (IL) (9–0)	Wisconsin–Whitewater (9–1)	Wisconsin–Oshkosh (11–2)	5.
6.	Wartburg	Wartburg (1–0)	Wartburg (2–0)	Wartburg (3–0)	Wartburg (3–0)	Wartburg (4–0)	Wisconsin–Whitewater (4–1)	Wisconsin–Whitewater (5–1)	St. Thomas (MN) (7–0)	Wisconsin–Whitewater (7–1)	Wisconsin–Whitewater (8–1)	Wheaton (IL) (10–0)	Wesley (11–2)	6.
7.	Wheaton (IL)	Wheaton (IL) (1–0)	Wheaton (IL) (2–0)	Wheaton (IL) (3–0)	Wheaton (IL) (3–0)	Wheaton (IL) (4–0)	Wheaton (IL) (5–0)	St. Thomas (MN) (6–0)	Wisconsin–Whitewater (6–1)	Wheaton (IL) (8–0)	Wabash (9–0)	Wabash (10–0)	Mary Hardin-Baylor (11–2)	7.
8.	John Carroll	Saint John's (MN) (1–0)	Saint John's (MN) (2–0)	Saint John's (MN) (3–0)	Wabash (3–0)	Wabash (4–0)	Wartburg (5–0)	Wheaton (IL) (6–0)	Wheaton (IL) (7–0)	Hardin–Simmons (8–0)	Johns Hopkins (9–0)	Johns Hopkins (10–0)	Wabash (12–1)	8.
9.	Saint John's (MN)	Wabash (1–0)	Wabash (1–0)	Wabash (2–0)	St. Thomas (MN) (3–0)	St. Thomas (MN) (4–0)	St. Thomas (MN) (5–0)	Wabash (6–0)	Wabash (7–0)	Wabash (8–0)	Thomas More (10–0)	Thomas More (10–0)	Wheaton (IL) (11–1)	9.
10.	Wabash	John Carroll (1–0)	John Carroll (1–0)	John Carroll (2–0)	Johns Hopkins (4–0)	Johns Hopkins (5–0)	Wabash (5–0)	Johns Hopkins (6–0)	Johns Hopkins (7–0)	Mary Hardin-Baylor (7–1)	Saint John's (MN) (8–1)	Saint John's (MN) (9–1)	Saint John's (MN) (10–2)	10.
11.	North Central (IL)	Johns Hopkins (1–0)	Johns Hopkins (2–0)	Johns Hopkins (3–0)	John Carroll (3–0)	Thomas More (5–0)	Johns Hopkins (5–0)	Thomas More (7–0)	Thomas More (8–0)	Johns Hopkins (8–0)	Wesley (8–1)	Wesley (9–1)	Thomas More (11–1)	11.
12.	Widener	St. Thomas (MN) (1–0)	St. Thomas (MN) (2–0)	St. Thomas (MN) (2–0)	Thomas More (4–0)	Wisconsin–Platteville (3–1)	Thomas More (6–0)	Wisconsin–Platteville (5–1)	Saint John's (MN) (6–1)	Thomas More (9–0)	Hardin–Simmons (8–1)	Hardin–Simmons (9–1)	Hardin–Simmons (9–2)	12.
13.	Johns Hopkins	North Central (IL) (0–0)	North Central (IL) (1–0)	Thomas More (3–0)	Washington & Jefferson (3–0)	Saint John's (MN) (4–1)	Wisconsin–Platteville (4–1)	Saint John's (MN) (5–1)	Hardin–Simmons (7–0)	Saint John's (MN) (7–1)	Mary Hardin-Baylor (8–1)	Mary Hardin-Baylor (9–1)	Johns Hopkins (11–1)	13.
14.	St. Thomas (MN)	Washington & Jefferson (1–0)	Washington & Jefferson (2–0)	Washington & Jefferson (3–0)	Wisconsin–Platteville (3–0)	Rowan (4–0)	Saint John's (MN) (4–1)	Hardin–Simmons (6–0)	Concordia Moorhead (7–1)	Wisconsin–Platteville (6–2)	Wisconsin–Platteville (7–2)	Wisconsin–Platteville (8–2)	Wisconsin–Platteville (8–2)	14.
15.	Washington & Jefferson	Hobart (1–0)	Thomas More (2–0)	Wittenberg (2–0)	Rowan (3–0)	Wisconsin–Oshkosh (3–1)	Hardin–Simmons (5–0)	Washington & Jefferson (5–1)	Illinois Wesleyan (7–0)	John Carroll (7–1)	John Carroll (8–1)	North Central (IL) (7–3)	Cortland State (9–3)	15.
16.	Hobart	Thomas More (1–0)	Hobart (2–0)	Rowan (2–0)	Saint John's (MN) (3–1)	Hardin–Simmons (4–0)	Washington & Jefferson (4–1)	North Central (IL) (4–2)	Wisconsin–Platteville (5–2)	North Central (IL) (5–3)	North Central (IL) (6–3)	Washington and Lee (10–0)	North Central (IL) (7–3)	16.
17.	Wittenberg	Wittenberg (1–0)	Wittenberg (1–0)	Wisconsin–Platteville (3–0)	Wisconsin–Oshkosh (2–1)	North Central (IL) (2–2)	North Central (IL) (3–2)	Concordia Moorhead (6–1)	John Carroll (6–1)	Washington and Lee (8–0)	Washington and Lee (9–0)	Texas Lutheran (8–2)	Albright (10–2)	17.
18.	Wisconsin–Oshkosh	Texas Lutheran (1–0)	Rowan (1–0)	Wisconsin–Oshkosh (2–1)	Hardin–Simmons (3–0)	Cortland State (5–0)	John Carroll (4–1)	John Carroll (5–1)	Salisbury (5–1)	Case Western Reserve (7–1)	Texas Lutheran (7–2)	Dubuque (8–2)	Texas Lutheran (8–2)	18.
19.	St. John Fisher	Bethel (MN) (1–0)	Centre (2–0)	Hardin–Simmons (3–0)	Ithaca (3–0)	Washington & Jefferson (3–1)	Concordia Moorhead (5–1)	Illinois Wesleyan (6–0)	North Central (IL) (4–3)	Delaware Valley (7–1)	Wartburg (8–1)	Wartburg (9–1)	Ohio Northern (9–3)	19.
20.	Bethel (MN)	Rowan (1–0)	Wisconsin–Oshkosh (1–1)	Ithaca (2–0)	Bethel (MN) (3–1)	Wittenberg (3–1)	Illinois Wesleyan (5–0)	Albright (6–0)	Cortland State (7–1)	Texas Lutheran (6–2)	Dubuque (7–2)	Albright (9–1)	Whitworth (9–2)	20.
21.	Texas Lutheran	Centre (1–0)	Hardin–Simmons (2–0)	Centre (3–0)	North Central (IL) (1–2)	John Carroll (3–1)	Albright (5–0)	Rowan (5–1)	Wartburg (6–1)	Wartburg (7–1)	Salisbury (6–2)	Salisbury (7–2)	Washington and Lee (10–1)	21.
22.	Centre	Chapman (0–0)	Wisconsin–Platteville (2–0)	North Central (IL) (1–1)	Cortland State (4–0)	Hobart (4–1)	Rowan (4–1)	Wartburg (5–1)	Washington and Lee (7–0)	Illinois Wesleyan (7–1)	Case Western Reserve (7–2)	Whitworth (9–1)	John Carroll (8–2)	22.
23.	Thomas More	Muhlenberg (1–0)	Bethel (MN) (1–1)	Bethel (MN) (2–1)	Guilford (3–0)	Concordia Moorhead (4–1)	Salisbury (3–1)	Salisbury (4–1)	Case Western Reserve (6–1)	Concordia Moorhead (7–2)	East Texas Baptist (7–2)	John Carroll (8–2)	Dubuque (8–3)	23.
24.	Chapman	Wisconsin–Oshkosh (0–1)	Ithaca (1–0)	Guilford (3–0)	Wittenberg (2–1)	Chicago (4–0)	Ithaca (4–1)	Texas Lutheran (5–1)	Delaware Valley (6–1)	Dubuque (6–2)	Albright (8–1)	Guilford (9–1)	Wartburg (9–1)	24.
25.	Muhlenberg	Wisconsin–Platteville (1–0)	Guilford (2–0)	Cortland State (3–0)	Hobart (3–1)	Illinois Wesleyan (4–0)	Texas Lutheran (5–1)	Whitworth (6–0)	Texas Lutheran (5–2)	St. Lawrence (7–1)	Whitworth (8–1)	Cortland State (8–2)	Huntingdon (10–2)	25.
	Preseason Jul 13	Week 1 Sep 5	Week 2 Sep 13	Week 3 Sep 20	Week 4 Sep 27	Week 5 Oct 4	Week 6 Oct 11	Week 7 Oct 18	Week 8 Oct 25	Week 9 Nov 1	Week 10 Nov 8	Week 11 Nov 15	Final Dec 21	
		Dropped: No. 12 Widener; No. 19 St. John Fisher	Dropped: No. 18 Texas Lutheran; No. 22 Chapman; No. 23 Muhlenberg	Dropped: No. 16 Hobart	Dropped: No. 21 Centre	Dropped: No. 19 Ithaca; No. 20 Bethel; No. 23 Guilford	Dropped: No. 18 Cortland State; No. 20 Wittenberg; No. 22 Hobart; No. 24 Chicago	Dropped: No. 24 Ithaca	Dropped: No. 15 Washington & Jefferson; No. 20 Albright; No. 21 Rowan; No. 25 Whitworth	Dropped: No. 18 Salisbury; No. 20 Cortland State	Dropped: No. 19 Delaware Valley; No. 22 Illinois Wesleyan; No. 23 Concordia Moorhead; No. 25 St. Lawrence	Dropped: No. 22 Case Western Reserve; No. 23 East Texas Baptist	Dropped: No. 21 Salisbury; No. 24 Guilford	

== AFCA Coaches Poll ==
	Week 3 Sep 21	Week 4 Sep 28	Week 5 Oct 5	Week 6 Oct 12	Week 7 Oct 19	Week 8 Oct 26	Week 9 Nov 2	Week 10 Nov 9	Week 11 Nov 16	Final Dec 21	
1.	Wisconsin–Whitewater (2–0) (36)	Wisconsin–Whitewater (3–0) (38)	Wisconsin–Whitewater (4–0) (37)	Mount Union (5–0) (38)	Mount Union (6–0) (37)	Mount Union (7–0) (37)	Mount Union (8–0) (39)	Mount Union (9–0) (38)	Mount Union (10–0) (39)	Mount Union (15–0) (42)	1.
2.	Mount Union (2–0) (5)	Mount Union (3–0) (2)	Mount Union (4–0) (3)	Mary Hardin–Baylor (5–0) (2)	Mary Hardin–Baylor (6–0) (2)	Mary Hardin–Baylor (7–0) (2)	Linfield (7–0) (3)	Linfield (8–0) (4)	Linfield (9–0) (3)	St. Thomas (MN) (14–1)	2.
3.	Mary Hardin–Baylor (3–0) (1)	Mary Hardin–Baylor (3–0) (1)	Mary Hardin–Baylor (4–0) (1)	Linfield (4–0) (2)	Linfield (5–0) (3)	Linfield (6–0) (3)	Wesley (8–0)	Wheaton (IL) (9–0)	St. Thomas (MN) (10–0)	Linfield (12–1)	3.
4.	Linfield (2–0)	Linfield (2–0)	Linfield (3–0) (1)	Wesley (5–0)	Wesley (6–0)	Wesley (7–0)	Wheaton (IL) (8–0)	St. Thomas (MN) (9–0)	Wheaton (IL) (10–0)	Wisconsin–Whitewater (12–2)	4.
5.	Wesley (2–0)	Wesley (3–0)	Wesley (3–0)	Wheaton (IL) (5–0)	Wheaton (IL) (6–0)	Wheaton (IL) (7–0)	St. Thomas (MN) (8–0)	Wisconsin–Oshkosh (8–1)	Wisconsin–Oshkosh (9–1)	Wisconsin–Oshkosh (11–2)	5.
6.	Wheaton (IL) (3–0)	Wheaton (IL) (3–0)	Wheaton (IL) (4–0)	Wartburg (5–0)	St. Thomas (MN) (6–0)	St. Thomas (MN) (7–0)	Wisconsin–Oshkosh (7–1)	Johns Hopkins (9–0)	Johns Hopkins (10–0)	Mary Hardin–Baylor (11–2)	6.
7.	Wartburg (3–0)	Wartburg (3–0)	Wartburg (4–0)	St. Thomas (MN) (5–0)	Wisconsin–Oshkosh (5–1)	Wisconsin–Oshkosh (6–1)	Hardin–Simmons (8–0)	Wabash (9–0)	Wabash (10–0)	Wesley (11–2)	7.
8.	Johns Hopkins (3–0)	Johns Hopkins (4–0)	St. Thomas (MN) (4–0)	Wisconsin–Oshkosh (4–1)	Johns Hopkins (6–0)	Johns Hopkins (7–0)	Johns Hopkins (8–0)	Wisconsin–Whitewater (8–1)	Wisconsin–Whitewater (9–1)	Wabash (12–1)	8.
9.	Saint John's (MN) (3–0)	Wabash (3–0)	Johns Hopkins (5–0)	Johns Hopkins (5–0)	Wabash (6–0)	Wabash (7–0)	Wabash (8–0)	Thomas More (10–0)	Thomas More (10–0)	Wheaton (IL) (11–1)	9.
10.	John Carroll (2–0)	St. Thomas (MN) (3–0)	Wabash (4–0)	Wabash (5–0)	Wisconsin–Whitewater (5–1)	Wisconsin–Whitewater (6–1)	Wisconsin–Whitewater (7–1)	Mary Hardin–Baylor (8–1)	Mary Hardin–Baylor (9–1)	Johns Hopkins (11–1)	10.
11.	Wabash (2–0)	John Carroll (3–0)	Thomas More (5–0)	Wisconsin–Whitewater (4–1)	Thomas More (7–0)	Thomas More (8–0)	Mary Hardin–Baylor (7–1)	Saint John's (MN) (8–1)	Saint John's (MN) (9–1)	Saint John's (MN) (10–2)	11.
12.	Washington & Jefferson (3–0)	Wisconsin–Platteville (3–0)	Hardin–Simmons (4–0)	Thomas More (6–0)	Hardin–Simmons (6–0)	Hardin–Simmons (7–0)	Thomas More (9–0)	Wesley (8–1)	Wesley (9–1)	Thomas More (11–1)	12.
13.	Wisconsin–Platteville (3–0)	Washington & Jefferson (3–0)	Rowan (4–0)	Hardin–Simmons (5–0)	Wisconsin–Platteville (5–1)	Illinois Wesleyan (7–0)	Saint John's (MN) (7–1)	Wartburg (8–1)	Hardin–Simmons (9–1)	Hardin–Simmons (9–2)	13.
14.	Thomas More (3–0)	Thomas More (4–0)	Wisconsin–Platteville (3–1)	Wisconsin–Platteville (4–1)	Saint John's (MN) (5–1)	Saint John's (MN) (6–1)	Wartburg (7–1)	John Carroll (8–1)	Wartburg (9–1)	Wartburg (9–1)	14.
15.	St. Thomas (MN) (2–0)	Hardin–Simmons (3–0)	Wisconsin–Oshkosh (3–1)	Saint John's (MN) (4–1)	Illinois Wesleyan (6–0)	Wartburg (6–1)	John Carroll (7–1)	Hardin–Simmons (8–1)	Washington and Lee (10–0)	Wisconsin–Platteville (8–2)	15.
16.	Wittenberg (2–0)	Rowan (3–0)	Saint John's (MN) (4–1)	Illinois Wesleyan (5–0)	Albright (6–0)	John Carroll (6–1)	Washington and Lee (8–0)	Washington and Lee (9–0)	Wisconsin–Platteville (8–2)	Washington and Lee (10–1)	16.
17.	Hardin–Simmons (3–0)	Ithaca (3–0)	Illinois Wesleyan (4–0)	Albright (5–0)	Washington & Jefferson (5–1)	Concordia Moorhead (7–1)	Wisconsin–Platteville (6–2)	Wisconsin–Platteville (7–2)	St. Norbert (10–0)	Albright (10–2)	17.
18.	Rowan (2–0)	Wisconsin–Oshkosh (2–1)	Cortland State (5–0)	Washington & Jefferson (4–1)	Wartburg (5–1)	Washington and Lee (7–0)	St. Norbert (8–0)	St. Norbert (9–0)	Albright (9–1)	Cortland State (9–3)	18.
19.	Ithaca (2–0)	Saint John's (MN) (3–1)	Albright (4–0)	John Carroll (4–1)	John Carroll (5–1)	Olivet (7–0)	Western New England (8–0)	Western New England (9–0)	Western New England (10–0)	St. Norbert (10–1)	19.
20.	Centre (3–0)	Illinois Wesleyan (3–0)	Washington & Jefferson (3–1)	Gustavus Adolphus (6–0)	Concordia Moorhead (6–1)	Wisconsin–Platteville (5–2)	Albright (7–1)	Albright (8–1)	Albion (9–1)	Albion (9–2)	20.
21.	Wisconsin–Oshkosh (2–1)	Guilford (3–0)	John Carroll (3–1)	Concordia Moorhead (5–1)	North Central (IL) (4–2)	St. Norbert (7–0) т	Delaware Valley (7–1)	Albion (8–1)	Whitworth (9–1)	Whitworth (9–2)	21.
22.	North Central (IL) (1–1)	Cortland State (4–0)	North Central (IL) (2–2)	North Central (IL) (3–2)	Albion (6–0)	Western New England (7–0) т	Illinois Wesleyan (7–1)	North Central (IL) (6–3)	John Carroll (8–2)	Western New England (10–1)	22.
23.	Illinois Wesleyan (3–0)	Bethel (MN) (3–1)	Gustavus Adolphus (5–0)	Rowan (4–1)	Rowan (5–1)	Salisbury (5–1)	North Central (IL) (5–3)	Whitworth (8–1)	North Central (IL) (7–3)	John Carroll (8–2)	23.
24.	Guilford (3–0)	North Central (IL) (1–2)	Concordia Moorhead (4–1)	Albion (5–0)	Washington and Lee (6–0)	Albright (6–1)	Concordia Moorhead (7–2)	Guilford (8–1)	Guilford (9–1)	Huntingdon (10–2)	24.
25.	Bethel (MN) (2–1)	Albright (3–0)	Wittenberg (3–1)	Washington and Lee (5–0)	Whitworth (6–0)	Cortland State (7–1)	Albion (7–1)	DePauw (8–1)	Dubuque (8–2)	Ohio Northern (9–3)	25.
	Week 3 Sep 21	Week 4 Sep 28	Week 5 Oct 5	Week 6 Oct 12	Week 7 Oct 19	Week 8 Oct 26	Week 9 Nov 2	Week 10 Nov 9	Week 11 Nov 16	Final Dec 21	
		Dropped: No. 16 Wittenberg; No. 20 Centre	Dropped: No. 17 Ithaca; No. 21 Guilford; No. 23 Bethel (MN)	Dropped: No. 18 Cortland State; No. 25 Wittenberg	Dropped: No. 20 Gustavus Adolphus	Dropped: No. 17 Washington & Jefferson; No. 21 North Central (IL); No. 22 Albion; No. 23 Rowan; No. 25 Whitworth	Dropped: No. 19 Olivet; No. 23 Salisbury; No. 25 Cortland State	Dropped: No. 21 Delaware Valley; No. 22 Illinois Wesleyan; No. 24 Concordia Moorhead	Dropped: No. 25 DePauw	Dropped: No. 23 North Central (IL); No. 24 Guilford; No. 25 Dubuque	
