= Dubuque football =

Dubuque football may refer to:

- Dubuque Spartans football of the University of Dubuque
- Loras Duhawks football of Loras College which was known as Dubuque College from 1914 to 1920.
