= Maury Waugh =

American football coach (born c. 1940)

Biographical details
- Born: c. 1940 (age 85–86)

Coaching career (HC unless noted)

Football
- 1964: Vandalia HS (IL) (assistant)
- 1965–1967: Clinton Central HS (IN)
- 1969–1974: Dubuque
- 1975–1979: Simpson (IA)
- 1980: Drake (LB)
- 1981–1982: Drake (DC/LB)
- 1983–1992: Northwestern (LB)
- 1991: Toronto Argonauts (assistant)
- 1992–1994: Lake Forest
- 1995: Pacific (CA) (LB)
- 1996: Libertyville HS (IL) (LB)
- 1997–2001: Western Carolina (assistant)
- 2002: Wayne State (MI) (DC)
- 2005–2009: Saint Francis (IN) (assistant)
- 2010–2019: Trine (ILB)

Baseball
- 1968: Dubuque

Head coaching record
- Overall: 37–88–3 (college football); 3–12 (college baseball)

Accomplishments and honors

Awards
- Football; Iowa Conference Coach of the Year (1972)

Maury Waugh (born c. 1940) is an American football coach. He was most recently an assistant coach at Trine University in Angola, Indiana, a position he held from 2010 to his retirement in 2019. Waugh served as the head football coach at the University of Dubuque in Dubuque, Iowa from 1969 to 1974, Simpson College in Indianola, Iowa from 1975 to 1979, and Lake Forest College in Lake Forest, Illinois from 1992 to 1994.

== Head coaching record ==
=== College football ===
Year	Team	Overall	Conference	Standing	Bowl/playoffs
Dubuque Spartans (Iowa Conference) (1969–1974)
1969	Dubuque	1–7	0–7	8th	
1970	Dubuque	2–7	2–5	6th	
1971	Dubuque	1–7–1	0–6–1	7th	
1972	Dubuque	5–4–1	3–3–1	4th	
1973	Dubuque	5–4–1	3–3–1	4th	
1974	Dubuque	2–8	1–6	7th	
Dubuque:		16–37–3	9–30–3		
Simpson Redmen (Iowa Conference) (1975–1979)
1975	Simpson	2–7	1–6	T–7th	
1976	Simpson	4–5	3–4	6th	
1977	Simpson	2–7	2–5	T–6th	
1978	Simpson	4–5	2–5	T–6th	
1979	Simpson	3–6	2–5	T–5th	
Simpson:		15–30	10–25		
Lake Forest Foresters (Midwest Conference) (1992–1994)
1992	Lake Forest	3–6	1–4	T–5th (North)	
1993	Lake Forest	2–7	1–4	6th (North)	
1994	Lake Forest	1–8	1–4	T–5th (North)	
Lake Forest:		6–21	3–12		
Total:		37–88–3			
