= Don Birmingham =

American football and basketball coach

Biographical details
- Born: c. 1940
- Education: Westmar (1962)

Playing career

Football
- 1961: Westmar

Coaching career (HC unless noted)

Football
- 1962: Westmar (assistant)
- 1966: Yankton (assistant)
- 1967–1969: Yankton
- 1970–1971: Eastern New Mexico (assistant)
- 1972–1973: Long Beach State (assistant)
- 1974–1976: Iowa Lakes
- 1977–1983: Dubuque
- 1984–1985: McMurry

Basketball
- 1966–1970: Yankton

Head coaching record
- Overall: 63–51–2 (college football); 17–11 (junior college football)
- Tournaments: Football; 0–2(NCAA D-III playoffs)

Accomplishments and honors

Championships
- Football; 1 Tri-State (1969); 3 IIAC (1978–1980)

Awards
- Football; 2× IIAC Coach of the Year (1979–1980)

Donald Birmingham (born c. 1940) is an American former football and basketball coach. He served as the head football coach at Yankton College in Yankton, South Dakota from 1967 to 1969, the University of Dubuque in Dubuque, Iowa from 1977 to 1983, and McMurry College in Abilene, Texas, compiling a career college football coaching record of 63–51–2.

Birmingham graduated in 1962 from Westmar College in Le Mars, Iowa. At Yankton, he coached future National Football League (NFL) player Lyle Alzado. With Dubuque he twice garnered Iowa Intercollegiate Athletic Conference (IIAC) Coach of the Year honors, in 1979 and 1980.

== Head coaching record ==
=== College football ===
Year	Team	Overall	Conference	Standing	Bowl/playoffs
Yankton Greyhounds (Tri-State Conference) (1967–1969)
1967	Yankton	8–1	5–1	2nd	
1968	Yankton	1–7–1	1–4–1	6th	
1969	Yankton	8–1	5–1	1st	
Yankton:		17–9–1	10–6–1		
Dubuque Spartans (Iowa Intercollegiate Athletic Conference) (1977–1983)
1977	Dubuque	4–6	2–5	T–6th	
1978	Dubuque	7–2	5–2	T–1st	
1979	Dubuque	9–1	7–0	1st	L NCAA Division Quarterfinal
1980	Dubuque	8–2–1	6–1	1st	L NCAA Division Quarterfinal
1981	Dubuque	4–6	4–3	4th	
1982	Dubuque	6–3	4–3	4th	
1983	Dubuque	4–6	3–4	T–4th	
Dubuque:		42–26–1	31–18		
McMurry Indians (Texas Intercollegiate Athletic Association) (1984–1985)
1984	McMurry	3–7	2–4	3rd	
1985	McMurry	1–9	1–5	4th	
McMurry:		4–16	3–9		
Total:		63–51–2			

=== Junior college ===
Year	Team	Overall	Conference	Standing	Bowl/playoffs
Iowa Lakes (Independent) (1974)
1974	Iowa Lakes	8–1			
Iowa Lakes (Iowa Junior College Conference) (1975–1976)
1975	Iowa Lakes	5–4	2–3	4th	
1976	Iowa Lakes	4–6	2–4	5th	
Iowa Lakes:		17–11	4–7		
Total:		17–11			
