= Vince Brautigam =

American football coach

Biographical details
- Education: Iowa Wesleyan (1988)

Coaching career (HC unless noted)
- 1988–1989: St. Cloud State (assistant)
- 1990–2000: Mount Senario
- 2001–2008: Dubuque
- 2010–2019: Cornell (IA)

Head coaching record
- Overall: 127–157

Accomplishments and honors

Championships
- 7 UMAC (1992–1994, 1997–2000)

Vince Brautigam is an American college football coach. He was most recently the head football coach at Cornell College in Mount Vernon, Iowa, a position he had held since the 2010 season. Brautigam previously served as the head football coach at Mount Senario College in Ladysmith, Wisconsin from 1990 to 2000 and the University of Dubuque from 2001 to 2008.

== Head coaching record ==
=== Football ===
Year	Team	Overall	Conference	Standing	Bowl/playoffs
Mount Senario Fighting Saints (Upper Midwest Athletic Conference) (1990–2000)
1990	Mount Senario	6–4			
1991	Mount Senario	6–4			
1992	Mount Senario	6–4		1st	
1993	Mount Senario	6–4		1st	
1994	Mount Senario	6–4		1st	
1995	Mount Senario	6–4			
1996	Mount Senario	6–4			
1997	Mount Senario	6–5		1st	
1998	Mount Senario	6–5		T–1st	
1999	Mount Senario	6–5		1st	
2000	Mount Senario	7–5		1st	
Mount Senario:		67–48			
Dubuque Spartans (Iowa Intercollegiate Athletic Conference) (2001–2008)
2001	Dubuque	2–8	1–8	10th	
2002	Dubuque	1–9	0–9	10th	
2003	Dubuque	0–10	0–8	10th	
2004	Dubuque	2–8	1–7	T–8th	
2005	Dubuque	2–8	1–7	T–8th	
2006	Dubuque	6–4	5–3	T–3rd	
2007	Dubuque	7–3	5–3	T–3rd	
2008	Dubuque	2–8	1–7	8th	
Dubuque:		22–58	14–52		
Cornell Rams (Iowa Intercollegiate Athletic Conference) (2010–2011)
2010	Cornell	0–10	0–8	9th	
2011	Cornell	3–7	1–7	8th	
Cornell Rams (Midwest Conference) (2012–2019)
2012	Cornell	4–6	4–5	7th	
2013	Cornell	7–3	7–2	T–2nd	
2014	Cornell	5–4	3–2	3rd (South)	
2015	Cornell	5–5	3–2	T–2nd (South)	
2016	Cornell	5–5	4–4	6th	
2017	Cornell	4–6	2–3	4th (South)	
2018	Cornell	5–5	2–3	T–3rd (South)	
Cornell:		38–51	26–36		
Total:		127–157			
National championship Conference title Conference division title or championship game berth
