= Owen P. Evans =

American football player and coach (1927–2018)

Biographical details
- Born: June 30, 1927; Racine, Wisconsin, U.S.
- Died: March 12, 2018 (aged 90); Mount Pleasant, Wisconsin, U.S.

Playing career
- 1946–1949: Wisconsin–La Crosse

Coaching career (HC unless noted)
- 1952–1955: River Falls HS (WI)
- 1956–1961: Berlin HS (WI)
- 1962–1968: Dubuque
- 1969: Wisconsin–Oshkosh (assistant)
- 1971–1972: William Horlick HS (WI)

Head coaching record
- Overall: 25–31–4 (college); 56–38–4 (high school)

Owen Pierce Evans (June 30, 1927 – March 12, 2018) was an American football player and coach. He served as the head football coach at the University of Dubuque from 1962 to 1968. Evans was also the head football coach at several Wisconsin high schools during his career and was inducted into the Wisconsin Football Coaches Hall of Fame.

== Head coaching record ==
=== College ===
Year	Team	Overall	Conference	Standing	Bowl/playoffs
Dubuque Spartans (Iowa Conference) (1962–1968)
1962	Dubuque	2–7	2–7	8th	
1963	Dubuque	3–4–1	3–4–1	5th	
1964	Dubuque	3–5–1	3–5	T–5th	
1965	Dubuque	6–2–1	5–2	3rd	
1966	Dubuque	5–4	3–4	5th	
1967	Dubuque	1–6–2	1–4–2	7th	
1968	Dubuque	4–5	3–4	5th	
Dubuque:		24–33–5	21–30–3		
Total:		24–33–5			
