= 2015 Wartburg Knights football team =

American college football season

2015 Wartburg Knights football
- Conference: Iowa Intercollegiate Athletic Conference

Ranking
- AFCA: No. 14
- D3Football.com: No. 24
- Record: 9–1 (6–1 IIAC)
- Head coach: Rick Willis (17th season)
- Offensive coordinator: Matt Wheeler (6th season)
- Defensive coordinator: Chris Winter (5th season)
- Home stadium: Walston-Hoover Stadium

2015 Iowa Intercollegiate Athletic Conference football standings
	Conf.			Overall
Team	W		L	W		L
No. 23 Dubuque $^	7	–	0	8	–	3
No. 24 Wartburg	6	–	1	9	–	1
Central (IA)	4	–	3	6	–	4
Coe	3	–	4	4	–	6
Loras	3	–	4	4	–	6
Simpson (IA)	3	–	4	4	–	6
Luther	2	–	5	4	–	6
Buena Vista	0	–	7	1	–	9
$ – Conference champion; ^ – NCAA Division III playoff participant; Rankings from D3football.com

The 2015 Wartburg Knights football team represented Wartburg College as a member of the Iowa Intercollegiate Athletic Conference (IIAC) during the 2015 NCAA Division III football season. Led by Rick Willis in his 17th season as head coach, the Knights compiled an overall record of 9–1 with a mark of 6–1 in conference play, finishing second and missing a chance at a third straight bid to the NCAA Division III Football Championship playoffs. The team played home games at Walston-Hoover Stadium in Waverly, Iowa.

== Schedule ==
Wartburg's 2015 regular season scheduled consisted of six home and four away games.

Date	Time	Opponent	Rank	Site	Result	Attendance	Source
September 5	1:00 p.m.	Augsburg*	No. 6	Walston-Hoover Stadium; Waverly, IA	W 35–27	2,700	
September 12	1:00 p.m.	at No. 19 Bethel (MN)*	No. 6	Royal Stadium; Arden Hills, MN	W 24–14	3,495	
September 19	7:00 p.m.	at Wisconsin–Stout*	No. 6	Williams Stadium; Menomonie, WI	W 41–33	1,742	
October 3	1:30 p.m.	Central (IA)^{†}	No. 6	Walston-Hoover Stadium; Waverly, IA	W 21–13	6,300	
October 10	1:00 p.m.	Coe	No. 6	Walston-Hoover Stadium; Waverly, IA	W 31–14	2,500	
October 17	1:00 p.m.	at Dubuque	No. 8	Chalmers Field; Dubuque, IA	L 13–45	3,986	
October 24	1:00 p.m.	at Luther	No. 22	Carlson Stadium; Decorah, IA	W 47–7	1,365	
October 31	1:00 p.m.	Buena Vista	No. 21	Walston-Hoover Stadium; Waverly, IA	W 55–0	1,800	
November 7	1:00 p.m.	Simpson	No. 21	Walston-Hoover Stadium; Waverly, IA	W 51–45	3,700	
November 14	1:00 p.m.	at Loras	No. 19	Rock Bowl; Dubuque, IA	W 49–34	4,173	
*Non-conference game; ^{†}Homecoming; Rankings from D3Football.com Poll released prior to the game; All times are in Central time

== Awards and honors ==
Individual awards
Player	Award
Logan Schrader	Gagliardi Trophy Semifinalist; IIAC Offensive Player of the year
Chase Wilhelms	D3football.com First-team All-American

All-Conference
Player	Position	Team	Year
Logan Schrader	QB	1	SR
Robbie Anstoetter	WR	1	SR
Chase Wilhelms	OL	1	SR
Cole Hinders	DL	1	SR
Will Janssen	LB	1	SR
Gunner Tranel	LB	1	SR
Logan Pitz	DB	1	SR
Brandon Domeyer	RB	2	SR
Mitch Rahm	TE	2	SR
Quincy Griffith	OL	2	JR
Nick Clasen	DL	2	SR
James Garlock	DB	2	Sr
Grant Zimmerman	P	2	Sr
HM = Honorable mention. Reference:
