= Mike Murray (American football) =

American football coach (born c. 1961)

Current position
- Title: Assistant head coach & defensive coordinator
- Team: Illinois Wesleyan
- Conference: CCIW

Biographical details
- Born: c. 1961 (age 64–65)
- Education: Illinois Wesleyan University (1984)

Playing career

Football
- 1980–1983: Illinois Wesleyan

Baseball
- 1980–1983: Illinois Wesleyan
- Position: Tight end (football)

Coaching career (HC unless noted)

Football
- 1985–1986: Illinois Wesleyan (GA)
- 1987–1996: Illinois Wesleyan (DC)
- 1997–2000: Dubuque
- 2001–2002: Benedictine (IL)
- 2005: Bloomington Extreme (OC)
- 2006–2007: Illinois Wesleyan (OC)
- 2008–2010: Illinois Wesleyan (DC/LB)
- 2011: Bloomington Extreme
- 2013–2017: North Central (IL) (DC)
- 2018–2019: Robert Morris (IL) (AHC/DC)
- 2020–2022: Roosevelt (assoc. HC/DC)
- 2023–2024: Elmhurst
- 2025–present: Illinois Wesleyan (AHC/DC)

Track and field
- 1987–1996: Illinois Wesleyan

Men's golf
- 2014–2015: North Central (IL)

Head coaching record
- Overall: 18–62 (college football); 9–5 (IFL)
- Tournaments: 0–1 (IFL playoffs)

Michael Murray (born c. 1961) is an American football coach. He is the assistant head football coach and defensive coordinator for Illinois Wesleyan University, positions he has held since 2025. He was the head football coach for the University of Dubuque from 1997 to 1999, Benedictine University from 2000 to 2001, Elmhurst University from 2023 to 2024, and the Bloomington Extreme of the Indoor Football League (IFL) in 2011. He was also the head track and field coach for Illinois Wesleyan University from 1987 to 1996 and the head men's golf coach for North Central University from 2014 to 2015. He also coached football for Illinois Wesleyan, North Central (IL), Robert Morris (IL), and Roosevelt. He played college football and baseball for Illinois Wesleyan.

== Head coaching record ==
=== Indoor football ===
Team	Year	Regular season				Postseason			
Team	Year	Won	Lost	Win %	Finish	Won	Lost	Win %	Result
BLO	2011	9	5	.643	2nd in Great Lakes	0	1	.000	Lost Wild Card Round (Omaha)
Career total		9	5	.643		0	1	.000	

=== College football ===
Year	Team	Overall	Conference	Standing	Bowl/playoffs
Dubuque Spartans (Iowa Conference) (1997–2000)
1997	Dubuque	3–7	1–7	8th	
1998	Dubuque	0–10	0–10	11th	
1999	Dubuque	1–9	1–8	11th	
2000	Dubuque	0–10	0–10	11th	
Dubuque:		4–36	2–35		
Benedictine Eagles (Illini–Badger Football Conference) (2001–2002)
2001	Benedictine	4–6	4–3	T–3rd	
2002	Benedictine	4–6	3–4	5th	
Benedictine:		8–12	7–7		
Elmhurst Bluejays (College Conference of Illinois and Wisconsin) (2023–2024)
2023	Elmhurst	3–7	2–7	T–8th	
2024	Elmhurst	3–7	3–6	T–7th	
Elmhurst:		6–14	5–13		
Total:		18–62			
