= Kenneth E. Mercer =

American football player and sports coach (1903–1970)

Biographical details
- Born: June 9, 1903; Albia, Iowa, U.S.
- Died: February 19, 1970 (aged 66); Asbury, Iowa, U.S.
- Height: 5 ft 11 in (180 cm)
- Weight: 183 lb (83 kg; 13 st 1 lb)

Playing career

Football
- 1925–1926: Simpson (IA)
- 1927–1929: Frankford Yellow Jackets
- Positions: Back; Placekicker

Coaching career (HC unless noted)

Football
- 1930–1931: Simpson (IA) (assistant)
- 1932–1935: Algona HS (IA)
- 1936–1938: Beloit (assistant)
- 1939–1961: Dubuque

Basketball
- 1940–1950: Dubuque

Administrative career (AD unless noted)
- 1932–1936: Algona HS (IA)
- 1939–?: Dubuque

Head coaching record
- Overall: 95–65–6 (college football); 112–34 (college basketball)

Accomplishments and honors

Championships
- Football; 3 Iowa Conference (1940, 1942, 1948)

Kenneth Ernest "Moco" Mercer (June 9, 1903 – February 19, 1970) was an American football player and coach of college and high school football and basketball. He played professionally in the National Football League (NFL) with the Frankford Yellow Jackets from 1927 to 1929. Though listed as a tail, blocking, and wing back throughout his 3 seasons, he also played both placekicker and possibly quarterback, throwing a touchdown and kicking the extra point right after as well as leading the NFL with 5 field goal makes in 1927. Mercer was voted by the Chicago Tribune to be a 1928 2nd team All-Pro as a blocking-back. Mercer was the head football coach at the University of Dubuque from 1939 to 1961, compiling a record of 95–65–6. He was also the head basketball coach at Dubuque from 1940 to 1950, tallying a mark of 112–34.

== Head coaching record ==
=== College football ===
Year	Team	Overall	Conference	Standing	Bowl/playoffs
Dubuque Spartans (Iowa Conference) (1939–1961)
1939	Dubuque	4–4	4–2	4th	
1940	Dubuque	7–1	7–0	1st	
1941	Dubuque	6–1–1	6–1–1	3rd	
1942	Dubuque	8–0	8–0	1st	
1943	No team—World War II				
1944	No team—World War II				
1945	Dubuque	4–2	2–2	T–4th	
1946	Dubuque	5–4	4–3	5th	
1947	Dubuque	5–2	4–1	5th	
1948	Dubuque	7–1	5–0	T–1st	
1949	Dubuque	6–2	4–1	2nd	
1950	Dubuque	3–5	1–4	T–4th (Southern)	
1951	Dubuque	3–4	3–2	T–2nd (Southern)	
1952	Dubuque	4–4	3–1	2nd (Southern)	
1953	Dubuque	4–3	2–2	3rd (Southern)	
1954	Dubuque	4–3–1	4–1–1	3rd	
1955	Dubuque	2–5	2–4	6th	
1956	Dubuque	3–3–2	3–3–2	T–5th	
1957	Dubuque	1–5–2	1–5–2	8th	
1958	Dubuque	5–4	4–4	T–4th	
1959	Dubuque	5–4	4–4	5th	
1960	Dubuque	4–4	4–4	5th	
1961	Dubuque	5–4	4–4	5th	
Dubuque:		95–65–6	79–48–8		
Total:		95–65–6			
National championship Conference title Conference division title or championship game berth
