= Donald Turner =

Donald Turner may refer to:

- Donald F. Turner (1921–1994), antitrust attorney and professor at Harvard Law School
- Donald H. Turner (1964–2024), Republican politician in the Vermont House of Representatives
- Donald Turner (football manager), manager of Partick Thistle F.C., 1929–47
- Don Turner, boxing trainer
- Don Turner (American football) (1930–2007), American football coach
