= 2015 NCAA Division III football season =

American college football season

- Regular season: September 5 – November 14, 2015
- Playoffs: November 21 – December 18, 2015
- National championship: Salem Football Stadium; Salem, Virginia
- Champion: Mount Union (12)
- Gagliardi Trophy: Joe Callahan, Wesley (DE)

The 2015 NCAA Division III football season, part of the college football season organized by the NCAA at the Division III level in the United States, began on September 5, 2015, and concluded with the NCAA Division III Football Championship, also known as the Stagg Bowl, on December 18, 2015, at Salem Football Stadium in Salem, Virginia. Mount Union, which made its 11th consecutive appearance in the title game, defeated St. Thomas (Minnesota) 49–35 to claim its 19th national title.

== Conference changes and new programs ==
One school added football at the Division III level and eight programs changed conference affiliations.

School	2014 conference	2015 conference
Belhaven	Mid-South (NAIA)	Independent
Christopher Newport	USA South	NJAC
Finlandia	No program	Independent
Frostburg State	Empire 8	NJAC
McMurry	Lone Star (D-II)	Independent
Morrisville State	NJAC	Empire 8
Salisbury	Empire 8	NJAC
SUNY Cortland	NJAC	Empire 8
Wesley	Independent	NJAC

A full list of Division III teams can be viewed on the D3football website.

== Conference standings ==
2015 American Southwest Conference football standings
	Conf.			Overall
Team	W		L	W		L
No. 7 Mary Hardin–Baylor +^	4	–	1	11	–	2
No. 12 Hardin–Simmons +^	4	–	1	9	–	2
East Texas Baptist +	4	–	1	7	–	3
Louisiana College	1	–	4	3	–	7
Sul Ross	1	–	4	3	–	7
Howard Payne	1	–	4	1	–	9
$ – Conference champion; ^ – NCAA Division III playoff participant; Rankings from D3football.com

2015 Centennial Conference football standings
	Conf.			Overall
Team	W		L	W		L
No. 13 Johns Hopkins $^	9	–	0	11	–	1
Moravian	7	–	2	8	–	3
Muhlenberg	7	–	2	8	–	3
Gettysburg	6	–	3	7	–	3
Franklin & Marshall	5	–	4	6	–	4
Susquehanna	4	–	5	5	–	5
Dickinson	3	–	6	3	–	7
Juniata	2	–	7	3	–	7
Ursinus	2	–	7	3	–	7
McDaniel	0	–	9	0	–	10
$ – Conference champion; ^ – NCAA Division III playoff participant; Rankings from D3football.com

2015 College Conference of Illinois and Wisconsin football standings
	Conf.			Overall
Team	W		L	W		L
No. 9 Wheaton (IL) $^	7	–	0	11	–	1
North Central (IL)	6	–	1	7	–	3
Illinois Wesleyan	4	–	3	7	–	3
Carthage	4	–	3	5	–	5
Augustana (IL)	3	–	4	4	–	6
North Park	2	–	5	3	–	7
Elmhurst	1	–	6	4	–	6
Millikin	1	–	6	2	–	8
$ – Conference champion; ^ – NCAA Division III playoff participant; Rankings from D3football.com

2015 Eastern Collegiate Football Conference standings
	Conf.			Overall
Team	W		L	W		L
Husson +	6	–	1	7	–	3
Norwich +^	6	–	1	6	–	5
Castleton	5	–	2	7	–	3
Becker	5	–	2	7	–	3
Maritime	3	–	4	5	–	5
Mount Ida	2	–	5	2	–	8
Anna Maria	1	–	6	1	–	9
Gallaudet	0	–	7	0	–	9
+ – Conference co-champions; ^ – NCAA Division III playoff participant

2015 Empire 8 Athletic Conference football standings
	Conf.			Overall
Team	W		L	W		L
No. 15 Cortland +^	6	–	2	9	–	3
St. John Fisher +	6	–	2	7	–	4
Alfred	5	–	3	8	–	3
Buffalo State	5	–	3	7	–	4
Morrisville State	4	–	4	6	–	4
Brockport	3	–	5	5	–	5
Utica	3	–	5	4	–	6
Ithaca	2	–	6	4	–	6
Hartwick	2	–	6	4	–	6
+ – Conference co-champions; ^ – NCAA Division III playoff participant; Rankings from D3football.com

2015 Heartland Collegiate Athletic Conference football standings
	Conf.			Overall
Team	W		L	W		L
Franklin (IN) $^	8	–	0	8	–	3
Rose–Hulman	6	–	2	8	–	2
Mount St. Joseph	6	–	2	7	–	3
Bluffton	5	–	3	6	–	4
Manchester	5	–	3	5	–	4
Anderson (IN)	2	–	6	2	–	8
Defiance	2	–	6	2	–	8
Hanover	2	–	6	2	–	8
Earlham	0	–	8	0	–	10
$ – Conference champion; ^ – NCAA Division III playoff participant

2015 Iowa Intercollegiate Athletic Conference football standings
	Conf.			Overall
Team	W		L	W		L
No. 23 Dubuque $^	7	–	0	8	–	3
No. 24 Wartburg	6	–	1	9	–	1
Central (IA)	4	–	3	6	–	4
Coe	3	–	4	4	–	6
Loras	3	–	4	4	–	6
Simpson (IA)	3	–	4	4	–	6
Luther	2	–	5	4	–	6
Buena Vista	0	–	7	1	–	9
$ – Conference champion; ^ – NCAA Division III playoff participant; Rankings from D3football.com

2015 Liberty League football standings
	Conf.			Overall
Team	W		L	W		L
RPI +	6	–	1	9	–	2
St. Lawrence +^	6	–	1	8	–	3
Hobart	5	–	2	7	–	3
WPI	4	–	3	7	–	4
Rochester (NY)	3	–	4	5	–	4
Springfield	2	–	5	4	–	6
Merchant Marine	2	–	5	3	–	6
Union (NY)	0	–	7	0	–	10
+ – Conference co-champions; ^ – NCAA Division III playoff participant

2015 Massachusetts State Collegiate Athletic Conference football standings
	Conf.			Overall
Team	W		L	W		L
Framingham State $^	8	–	0	9	–	2
Fitchburg State	6	–	2	8	–	3
Bridgewater State	6	–	2	7	–	4
Western Connecticut	4	–	4	5	–	5
Worcester State	4	–	4	4	–	6
Massachusetts Maritime	3	–	5	4	–	6
UMass Dartmouth	3	–	5	4	–	6
Plymouth State	1	–	7	2	–	8
Westfield State	1	–	7	2	–	8
$ – Conference champion; ^ – NCAA Division III playoff participant

2015 Michigan Intercollegiate Athletic Association football standings
	Conf.			Overall
Team	W		L	W		L
Olivet +	5	–	1	9	–	1
Albion +^	5	–	1	9	–	2
Adrian	4	–	2	7	–	3
Trine	4	–	2	6	–	4
Alma	2	–	4	5	–	5
Kalamazoo	1	–	5	3	–	7
Hope	0	–	6	2	–	8
+ – Conference co-champions; ^ – NCAA Division III playoff participant

2015 Middle Atlantic Conference football standings
	Conf.			Overall
Team	W		L	W		L
No. 17 Albright $^	8	–	1	10	–	2
Stevenson	7	–	2	9	–	2
Delaware Valley	7	–	2	9	–	2
Widener	6	–	3	6	–	4
Lebanon Valley	5	–	4	5	–	5
Lycoming	4	–	5	4	–	6
King's	3	–	6	3	–	7
FDU Florham	2	–	7	3	–	7
Wilkes	2	–	7	2	–	8
Misericordia	1	–	8	1	–	9
$ – Conference champion; ^ – NCAA Division III playoff participant; Rankings from D3football.com

2015 Midwest Conference football standings
	Conf.			Overall
Team	W		L	W		L
North
St. Norbert xy$^	5	–	0	10	–	1
Carroll (WI)	4	–	1	6	–	4
Ripon	3	–	2	7	–	3
Macalester	2	–	3	4	–	6
Beloit	1	–	4	3	–	7
Lawrence	0	–	5	1	–	9
South
Monmouth (IL) xy	5	–	0	8	–	2
Cornell (IA)	3	–	2	5	–	5
Illinois College	3	–	2	5	–	5
Lake Forest	3	–	2	4	–	6
Knox	1	–	4	3	–	7
Grinnell	0	–	5	2	–	8
Championship: St. Norbert 16, Monmouth 7
$ – Conference champion; x – Division champion/co-champions; y – Championship game participant; ^ – NCAA Division III playoff participant

2015 Minnesota Intercollegiate Athletic Conference football standings
	Conf.			Overall
Team	W		L	W		L
No. 2 St. Thomas (MN) $^	8	–	0	14	–	1
No. 10 Saint John's (MN) ^	7	–	1	10	–	2
Concordia–Moorhead	5	–	3	7	–	3
Gustavus Adolphus	5	–	3	7	–	3
Augsburg	4	–	4	5	–	5
Bethel (MN)	4	–	4	5	–	5
Hamline	2	–	6	4	–	6
St. Olaf	1	–	7	2	–	8
Carleton	0	–	8	1	–	9
$ – Conference champion; ^ – NCAA Division III playoff participant; Rankings from D3football.com

2015 New England Football Conference standings
	Conf.			Overall
Team	W		L	W		L
Western New England $^	7	–	0	10	–	1
Salve Regina	5	–	2	8	–	2
Endicott	5	–	2	5	–	5
Coast Guard	4	–	3	5	–	5
Curry	3	–	4	4	–	6
Maine Maritime	2	–	5	3	–	6
MIT	2	–	5	2	–	8
Nichols	0	–	7	1	–	9
$ – Conference champion; ^ – NCAA Division III playoff participant

2015 New England Small College Athletic Conference football standings
	Conf.			Overall
Team	W		L	W		L
Amherst $	8	–	0	8	–	0
Trinity (CT)	7	–	1	7	–	1
Tufts	6	–	2	6	–	2
Middlebury	5	–	3	5	–	3
Wesleyan	5	–	3	5	–	3
Bates	2	–	6	2	–	6
Bowdoin	2	–	6	2	–	6
Hamilton	2	–	6	2	–	6
Williams	2	–	6	2	–	6
Colby	1	–	7	1	–	7
$ – Conference champion

2015 New Jersey Athletic Conference football standings
	Conf.			Overall
Team	W		L	W		L
No. 6 Wesley $^	8	–	1	11	–	2
Salisbury ^	7	–	1	7	–	3
Kean	6	–	3	8	–	3
Frostburg State	5	–	4	6	–	4
Rowan	5	–	4	6	–	4
TCNJ	4	–	4	4	–	5
Montclair State	4	–	5	4	–	6
Christopher Newport	4	–	5	4	–	6
William Paterson	1	–	8	2	–	8
Southern Virginia #	0	–	9	0	–	10
$ – Conference champion; ^ – NCAA Division III playoff participant; # – Provisional NCAA Division III member

2015 North Coast Athletic Conference football standings
	Conf.			Overall
Team	W		L	W		L
No. 8 Wabash $^	9	–	0	12	–	1
DePauw	7	–	2	8	–	2
Wittenberg	7	–	2	8	–	2
Denison	6	–	3	7	–	3
Ohio Wesleyan	5	–	4	5	–	5
Hiram	4	–	5	4	–	6
Oberlin	3	–	6	3	–	7
Kenyon	2	–	7	2	–	8
Wooster	2	–	7	2	–	8
Allegheny	0	–	9	0	–	10
$ – Conference champion; ^ – NCAA Division III playoff participant; Rankings from D3football.com

2015 Northern Athletics Collegiate Conference football standings
	Conf.			Overall
Team	W		L	W		L
Lakeland $^	6	–	0	8	–	3
Benedictine (IL)	5	–	1	7	–	3
Wisconsin Lutheran	4	–	2	5	–	5
Concordia (WI)	3	–	3	3	–	7
Aurora	2	–	4	3	–	7
Rockford	1	–	5	3	–	7
Concordia (IL)	0	–	6	2	–	8
$ – Conference champion; ^ – NCAA Division III playoff participant

2015 Northwest Conference football standings
	Conf.			Overall
Team	W		L	W		L
No. 3 Linfield $^	7	–	0	12	–	1
No. 20 Whitworth ^	6	–	1	9	–	2
Puget Sound	5	–	2	6	–	3
Pacific (OR)	4	–	3	6	–	4
George Fox	2	–	5	4	–	6
Pacific Lutheran	2	–	5	2	–	7
Willamette	2	–	5	2	–	7
Lewis & Clark	0	–	7	0	–	9
$ – Conference champion; ^ – NCAA Division III playoff participant; Rankings from D3football.com

2015 Ohio Athletic Conference football standings
	Conf.			Overall
Team	W		L	W		L
No. 1 Mount Union $^	9	–	0	15	–	0
No. 22 John Carroll	7	–	2	8	–	2
No. 19 Ohio Northern ^	7	–	2	9	–	3
Baldwin Wallace	7	–	2	7	–	3
Heidelberg	5	–	4	5	–	5
Otterbein	4	–	5	4	–	6
Capital	3	–	6	3	–	7
Marietta	2	–	7	2	–	8
Muskingum	1	–	8	1	–	9
Wilmington (OH)	0	–	9	1	–	9
$ – Conference champion; ^ – NCAA Division III playoff participant; Rankings from D3football.com

2015 Old Dominion Athletic Conference football standings
	Conf.			Overall
Team	W		L	W		L
No. 21 Washington and Lee $^	7	–	0	10	–	1
Guilford	6	–	1	9	–	1
Emory & Henry	4	–	3	6	–	4
Hampden–Sydney	4	–	3	6	–	4
Randolph–Macon	3	–	4	4	–	6
Bridgewater	2	–	5	4	–	6
Shenandoah	1	–	6	4	–	6
Catholic University	1	–	6	3	–	7
$ – Conference champion; ^ – NCAA Division III playoff participant; Rankings from D3football.com

2015 Presidents' Athletic Conference football standings
	Conf.			Overall
Team	W		L	W		L
No. 11 Thomas More $^	8	–	0	11	–	1
Westminster (PA)	7	–	1	9	–	2
Washington & Jefferson	6	–	2	8	–	2
Carnegie Mellon	6	–	2	8	–	3
Case Western Reserve	6	–	2	7	–	3
Bethany (WV)	4	–	4	5	–	5
Saint Vincent	3	–	5	4	–	6
Waynesburg	2	–	6	3	–	7
Geneva	1	–	7	2	–	8
Thiel	1	–	7	2	–	8
Grove City	0	–	8	0	–	10
$ – Conference champion; ^ – NCAA Division III playoff participant; Rankings from D3football.com

2015 Southern Athletic Association football standings
	Conf.			Overall
Team	W		L	W		L
Hendrix $^	7	–	1	8	–	3
Centre	6	–	2	8	–	2
Berry	6	–	2	7	–	3
Chicago	5	–	3	6	–	4
Washington University	5	–	3	6	–	4
Birmingham–Southern	3	–	5	5	–	5
Rhodes	2	–	6	4	–	6
Millsaps	2	–	6	3	–	7
Sewanee	0	–	8	1	–	9
$ – Conference champion; ^ – NCAA Division III playoff participant

2015 Southern California Intercollegiate Athletic Conference football standings
	Conf.			Overall
Team	W		L	W		L
La Verne $^	7	–	0	8	–	2
Claremont–Mudd–Scripps	6	–	1	7	–	2
Occidental	4	–	3	5	–	4
Chapman	4	–	3	4	–	5
Redlands	4	–	3	4	–	5
Cal Lutheran	2	–	5	4	–	5
Pomona–Pitzer	1	–	6	2	–	7
Whittier	0	–	7	0	–	9
$ – Conference champion; ^ – NCAA Division III playoff participant; Rankings from D3football.com

2015 Southern Collegiate Athletic Conference football standings
	Conf.			Overall
Team	W		L	W		L
No. 18 Texas Lutheran $	3	–	0	8	–	2
Trinity (TX)	2	–	1	8	–	2
Austin	1	–	2	5	–	5
Southwestern (TX)	0	–	3	2	–	8
$ – Conference champion; Rankings from D3football.com

2015 Upper Midwest Athletic Conference football standings
	Conf.			Overall
Team	W		L	W		L
St. Scholastica $^	9	–	0	9	–	2
Northwestern (MN)	8	–	1	8	–	3
Westminster (MO)	6	–	3	6	–	4
MacMurray	5	–	4	6	–	4
Eureka	4	–	5	5	–	5
Crown	4	–	5	4	–	6
Minnesota–Morris	4	–	5	4	–	6
Greenville	3	–	6	3	–	7
Martin Luther	1	–	8	2	–	8
Iowa Wesleyan #	1	–	8	1	–	9
$ – Conference champion; ^ – NCAA Division III playoff participant; # – Provisional NCAA Division III member

2015 USA South Athletic Conference football standings
	Conf.			Overall
Team	W		L	W		L
No. 25 Huntingdon $^	7	–	0	10	–	2
Maryville (TN)	5	–	2	8	–	2
North Carolina Wesleyan	5	–	2	5	–	5
Averett	2	–	4	2	–	7
LaGrange	2	–	4	2	–	7
Methodist	2	–	5	4	–	6
Greensboro	2	–	5	3	–	7
Ferrum	2	–	5	2	–	8
$ – Conference champion; ^ – NCAA Division III playoff participant; Rankings from D3football.com

2015 Wisconsin Intercollegiate Athletic Conference football standings
	Conf.			Overall
Team	W		L	W		L
No. 5 Wisconsin–Oshkosh $^	7	–	0	11	–	2
No. 4 Wisconsin–Whitewater ^	6	–	1	12	–	2
No. 14 Wisconsin–Platteville	5	–	2	8	–	2
Wisconsin–Stevens Point	3	–	4	5	–	5
Wisconsin–River Falls	3	–	4	4	–	6
Wisconsin–La Crosse	2	–	5	3	–	7
Wisconsin–Stout	2	–	5	3	–	7
Wisconsin–Eau Claire	0	–	7	0	–	10
$ – Conference champion; ^ – NCAA Division III playoff participant; Rankings from D3football.com

2015 NCAA Division III independents football records
	Conf.			Overall
Team	W		L	W		L
McMurry #		–		4	–	6
Finlandia		–		3	–	7
Belhaven #		–		2	–	8
Maranatha Baptist		–		1	–	8
Alfred State #		–		1	–	9
# – Provisional Division III member

== Conference summaries ==
- Conferences highlighted in yellow do not receive automatic bids to the 2015 playoffs.

Conference	Champion	Record	Offensive Player of the Year	Defensive Player of the Year	Coach of the Year
ASC	East Texas Baptist; Hardin–Simmons; Mary Hardin–Baylor	7–3; 9–2; 10–1	Jessie Ramos, HSU	Teidrick Smith, UMHB	Joshua Eargle, ETBU
Centennial	Johns Hopkins	11–0	Bradley Munday, Johns Hopkins	Keith Corliss, Johns Hopkins	Jeff Pukszyn, Moravian
CCIW	Wheaton (IL)	11–0	Sam Frasco, Augustana	Adam Dansdill, Wheaton	Mike Swider, Wheaton
ECFC	Norwich	6–5	John Smith, Husson	Bryant Wade, Husson	Mike Lichten, Becker
Empire 8	SUNY Cortland	9–2	Dan Andrews, SUNY Brockport	Tarik Bennett, SUNY Brockport	Daniel MacNiell, SUNY Cortland
HCAC	Franklin	8–3	Chase Burton, Franklin	Ryan Aelker, Bluffton	Nick Johnson, Earlham
IIAC	Dubuque	8–3	Logan Schrader, Wartburg	Blaine Snitker, Dubuque	Stan Zweifel, Dubuque
Liberty	St. Lawrence	8–3	Jeff Avery, RPI; Mike Lefflbine, St. Lawrence	Max Nacewicz, Springfield	Mark Raymond, St. Lawrence
MSCAC	Framingham State	9–2	Matt Silva, Framingham State	Matt Mangano, Framingham State	Tom Kelley, Framingham State
MIAA	Albion	9–2	Dominic Bona, Albion	Terry Calagon, Alma	
MAC	Albright	10–1	Malik Pressley, FDU-Florham	Brandon Jones, Widener	John Marzka, Albright
Midwest	St. Norbert	10–1	Jacob Bunk, St. Norbert	Zach Hauser, Macalester	Dan McCarty, St. Norbert; Chad Braun, Monmouth
MIAC	St. Thomas (MN)	11–0	Ayrton Scott, Augsburg	Ryan Winter, St. Thomas	Glenn Caruso, St. Thomas; Peter Haugen, Gustavus Adolphus
NEFC	Western New England	10–1	Tyler Ward, Western New England	Obi Etuka, Western New England	Keith Emery, Western New England
NESCAC	Amherst	8–0	Chance Brady, Tufts	Jimmy Fairfield-Sonn, Amherst	E.J. Mills, Amherst
NJAC	Salisbury	7–3	Joe Callahan, Wesley	Darren Dungee, Rowan	Sherman Wood, Salisbury
NCAC	Wabash	11–0	Mason Zurek, Wabash	Tyler McCullen, Wabash	Eric Raeburn, Wabash
NACC	Lakeland	8–3	Michael Whitley, Lakeland	Landon Deringer, Lakeland; Tanner Behnke, Wisc. Lutheran	Colin Bruton, Lakeland
Northwest	Linfield	10–0	Sam Riddle, Linfield	Alex Hoff, Linfield	Joseph Smith, Linfield
OAC	Mount Union	11–0	Justin Magazine, Ohio Northern; Anthony Latina, John Carroll; Devon Price, Ohio Northern	Tom Lally, Mount Union; Tre Jones, Mount Union; Hank Spencer, Mount Union	Dean Paul, Ohio Northern
ODAC	Washington and Lee	10–1	Matt Pawlowski, Guilford	Jake Payne, Shenandoah	Scott Abell, Washington and Lee
PAC	Thomas More	11–0	Sam Benger, Carnegie Mellon	Erick Butler, Thomas More	Regis Scafe, Thomas More
SAA	Hendrix	8–3	Dayton Winn, Hendrix	Michael Shield, Rhodes	Buck Buchanan, Hendrix
SCIAC	La Verne	8–2	Kwame Do, Occidental	Paul Slaats, Claremont-Mudd-Scripps	Chris Krich, La Verne
SCAC	Texas Lutheran	8–2	Trenton White, Texas Lutheran	Julian Turner, Trinity	Danny Padron, Texas Lutheran
UMAC	St. Scholastica	9–2	Latif Adams, Westminster (MO)	Alex Mangan, St. Scholastica	Chris Douglas, MacMurray
USA South	Huntingdon	10–1	Malik Adams, NC Wesleyan	Anthony White, Huntingdon	Mike Turk, Huntingdon
WIAC	UW–Oshkosh	10–1	Brett Kasper, UW-Oshkosh	Andrew Robinson, UW-Platteville	Pat Cerroni, UW-Oshkosh

== Postseason ==
Twenty-five conferences met the requirements for an automatic ("Pool A") bid to the playoffs. Besides the NESCAC, which does not participate in the playoffs, two conferences had no Pool A bid. The American Southwest, which had fallen below the required seven members in 2013, lost its Pool A bid after the two-year grace period; the SCAC had only four members. The MASCAC and SAA gained Pool A bids for the first time, having passed through the two-year waiting period.

Schools not in Pool A conferences were eligible for Pool B. The number of Pool B bids was determined by calculating the ratio of Pool A conferences to schools in those conferences and applying that ratio to the number of Pool B schools. The 25 Pool A conferences contained 220 schools, an average of 8.8 teams per conference. Twelve schools were in Pool B, enough for one bid.

The remaining six playoff spots were at-large ("Pool C") teams.

=== Playoff bracket ===
First round November 21, 2015
St. Thomas (MN)*	57
La Verne	14
St. John's (MN)*	51
Dubuque	7
Thomas More*	51
Washington and Lee	21
Wabash*	35
Albion	14
Linfield*	48
Whitworth	10
SUNY Cortland*	45
Salisbury	21
Huntingdon*	38
Hendrix	27
Hardin–Simmons*	19
Mary Hardin–Baylor	37
Mount Union*	55
St. Lawrence	23
Albright*	49
Norwich	0
Wesley*	42
Framingham State	22
Johns Hopkins*	52
Western New England	20
Wisconsin–Oshkosh*	48
St. Scholastica	0
Franklin*	22
Ohio Northern	27
Wisconsin–Whitewater*	48
St. Norbert	0
Wheaton (IL)*	55
Lakeland	6

Second round November 28, 2015
St. Thomas (MN)*	38
St. John's (MN)	19
Thomas More	27
Wabash* †	33
Linfield*	38
SUNY Cortland	22
Huntingdon	23
Mary Hardin–Baylor*	43
Mount Union*	66
Albright	7
Wesley	42
Johns Hopkins*	37
Wisconsin–Oshkosh*	42
Ohio Northern	7
Wisconsin-Whitewater	31
Wheaton (IL)*	17

Quarterfinals; December 5, 2015
St. Thomas (MN)*	38
Wabash	7
Linfield*	38
Mary Hardin–Baylor	35
Mount Union*	56
Wesley	35
Wisconsin–Oshkosh*	29
Wisconsin–Whitewater	31

Semifinals; December 12, 2015
St. Thomas (MN)*	38
Linfield	17
Mount Union*	36
Wisconsin–Whitewater	6

Championship; December 18, 2015; Salem Football Stadium; Salem, Virginia
St. Thomas (MN)	35
Mount Union	49

* Home team † Overtime Winner

=== Bowl games ===
Date	Bowl	Location	Home team	Away team	Score
Nov. 20, 2015	ECAC Chapman Bowl	Arute Field; New Britain, Connecticut	Husson	Salve Regina	42–39
Nov. 20, 2015	ECAC President's Bowl	Arute Field; New Britain, Connecticut	WPI	Kean	24–6
Nov. 21, 2015	Centennial–MAC Bowl Series	Scotty Wood Stadium; Allentown, Pennsylvania	Muhlenberg	Stevenson	14–9
Nov. 21, 2015	Centennial-MAC Bowl Series	James Work Memorial Stadium; Doylestown, Pennsylvania	Delaware Valley	Moravian	20–16
Nov. 21, 2015	ECAC Lynah Bowl	Arute Field; New Britain, Connecticut	St. John Fisher	Westminster (PA)	42–21
Nov. 21, 2015	ECAC Bushnell Bowl	Arute Field; New Britain, Connecticut	Buffalo State	RPI	20–13
Nov. 22, 2015	ECAC Legacy Bowl	Arute Field; New Britain, Connecticut	Bridgewater State	Carnegie Mellon	48–13
Nov. 22, 2015	ECAC Whitelaw Bowl	Arute Field; New Britain, Connecticut	Alfred	Fitchburg State	11–10

== See also ==
- 2015 NCAA Division III football rankings
- 2015 NCAA Division I FBS football season
- 2015 NCAA Division I FCS football season
- 2015 NCAA Division II football season
