= Don Turner (American football) =

American football coach (1930–2007)

Biographical details
- Born: December 12, 1930; Monmouth, Illinois, U.S.
- Died: April 18, 2007 (aged 76); Bella Vista, Arkansas, U.S.
- Education: Monmouth (IL) (1956)

Coaching career (HC unless noted)
- c. 1962: Imperial Valley (assistant)
- 1964: Imperial Valley
- 1965–1967: Santa Barbara
- 1968–1971: UC Santa Barbara (assistant)
- 1972: Minnesota–Morris
- 1973–1974: United States International
- 1975–1976: Bemidji State
- 1978–1983: Eastern Oregon
- 1984–1986: Chadron State
- 1987–1989: Dubuque
- 1990–1992: Bethany (WV)
- 2002: North Mason HS (WA)

Administrative career (AD unless noted)
- 1972–1973: Minnesota–Morris

Head coaching record
- Overall: 95–103–3 (college)

Accomplishments and honors

Championships
- 1 Evergreen (1980)

Awards
- IIAC Coach of the Year (1987)

Donald Duane "Coach D" Turner (December 12, 1930 – April 18, 2007) was an American football coach. He served in a variety coaching roles at number of high schools and colleges.

Turner was the head coach at the University of Minnesota Morris in Morris, Minnesota (1972), United States International University—now known as Alliant International University—in California (1973–1974), Bemidji State University in Bemidji, Minnesota (1975–1977), Eastern Oregon University in La Grande, Oregon (1978–1983), Chadron State College in Chadron, Nebraska (1984–1986), the University of Dubuque in Dubuque, Iowa (1987–1989), and Bethany College in Bethany, West Virginia (1990–1992).

Turner's 1980 team at Eastern Oregon won the Evergreen Conference championship.

After leaving the college game, Turner was an assistant coach and a head coach at a number of high schools, including North Mason High School in Mason County, Washington.

== Head coaching record ==
=== College ===
Year	Team	Overall	Conference	Standing	Bowl/playoffs
Minnesota Morris Cougars (Northern Intercollegiate Conference) (1972)
1972	Minnesota Morris	8–2	5–1	2nd	
Minnesota Morris:		8–2	5–1		
United States International Westerners (NCAA Division II independent) (1973–1974)
1973	United States International	5–4			
1974	United States International	4–5			
United States International:		9–9			
Bemidji State Beavers (Northern Intercollegiate Conference) (1975–1977)
1975	Bemidji State	2–7	1–5	6th	
1976	Bemidji State	6–4	3–4	T–5th	
1977	Bemidji State	7–3	5–2	T–2nd	
Bemidji State:		15–14	9–11		
Eastern Oregon Mountaineers (Evergreen Conference) (1978–1983)
1978	Eastern Oregon	5–5 (Note: Eastern Oregon finished the 1978 with an overall record of 4–6 and a mark of 2–4 in conference play, tying for fifth place in the Evergreen Conference. In January 1979, Central Washington forfeited its three wins, including its victory over Eastern Oregon, from 1978 because of ineligible player.)	3–3	T–5th	
1979	Eastern Oregon	6–4	3–2	T–2nd	
1980	Eastern Oregon	8–1	4–1	T–1st	
1981	Eastern Oregon	5–4	3–1	2nd	
1982	Eastern Oregon	5–4	2–2	4th	
1983	Eastern Oregon	5–5	3–4	5th	
Eastern Oregon:		34–23	18–13		
Chadron State Eagles (NAIA Division II independent) (1984–1986)
1984	Chadron State	2–8–1			
1985	Chadron State	5–3–1			
1986	Chadron State	3–6			
Chadron State:		10–17–2			
Dubuque Spartans (Iowa Intercollegiate Athletic Conference) (1987–1989)
1987	Dubuque	6–5	4–4	T–4th	
1988	Dubuque	3–7	3–5	T–6th	
1989	Dubuque	4–6	3–5	T–6th	
Dubuque:		13–18	10–14		
Bethany Bison (Presidents' Athletic Conference) (1990–1992)
1990	Bethany	1–7–1	1–3	T–3rd	
1991	Bethany	2–7	0–4	5th	
1992	Bethany	3–6	2–2	3rd	
Bethany:		6–20–1	3–9		
Total:		95–103–3			
