= Stan Zweifel =

American football player and coach (born 1952)

Biographical details
- Born: April 22, 1952 (age 74); New Glarus, Wisconsin, U.S.

Playing career

Football
- 1970–1973: Wisconsin–River Falls

Baseball
- 1971–1974: Wisconsin–River Falls

Coaching career (HC unless noted)

Football
- 1975: Markesan HS (WI)
- 1976–1979: New Ulm HS (MN) (AHC/OC)
- 1980–1982: Minnesota State (OC)
- 1983–1984: Yankton
- 1985–1986: Northern Colorado (OC/QB/WR)
- 1987–1990: Minnesota–Morris
- 1991–2006: Wisconsin–Whitewater (AHC/OC)
- 2007–2008: Minnesota State (AHC/OC)
- 2009–2023: Dubuque

Head coaching record
- Overall: 115–86–2 (college)
- Tournaments: 0–2 (NCAA D-III playoffs)

Accomplishments and honors

Championships
- 1 NSIC (1987); 2 IIAC (2011, 2015)

Awards
- 2× IIAC Coach of the Year (2011, 2015)

Stan Zweifel (born April 22, 1952) is an American former college football coach. He was the head football coach at the University of Dubuque from 2009 to 2023. Zweifel served as the head football coach at Yankton College in Yankton, South Dakota from 1983 to 1984, and the University of Minnesota Morris from 1987 to 1990. Between his tenures as Yankton and Minnesota–Morris, he was the offensive coordinator at the University of Northern Colorado.

== Head coaching record ==
=== College ===
Year	Team	Overall	Conference	Standing	Bowl/playoffs
Yankton Greyhounds (South Dakota Intercollegiate Conference) (1983–1984)
1983	Yankton	5–3–2	4–2–1	4th	
1984	Yankton	4–5	2–4	T–4th	
Yankton:		9–8–2	6–6–1		
Minnesota–Morris Cougars (Northern Sun Intercollegiate Conference) (1987–1990)
1987	Minnesota–Morris	6–4	5–1	1st	
1988	Minnesota–Morris	4–6	3–3	4th	
1989	Minnesota–Morris	6–4	3–3	T–4th	
1990	Minnesota–Morris	4–7	2–4	5th	
Minnesota–Morris:		20–21	13–11		
Dubuque Spartans (Iowa Intercollegiate Athletic Conference / American Rivers Conference) (2009–2023)
2009	Dubuque	5–5	4–4	T–5th	
2010	Dubuque	4–6	3–5	6th	
2011	Dubuque	9–2	7–1	1st	L NCAA Division III First Round
2012	Dubuque	5–5	4–3	T–2nd	
2013	Dubuque	5–5	4–3	T–3rd	
2014	Dubuque	4–6	3–4	5th	
2015	Dubuque	8–3	7–0	1st	L NCAA Division III First Round
2016	Dubuque	8–2	6–2	T–2nd	
2017	Dubuque	6–4	4–4	T–4th	
2018	Dubuque	7–3	6–2	T–2nd	
2019	Dubuque	7–3	6–2	3rd	
2020–21	Dubuque	1–0	1–0	T–2nd	
2021	Dubuque	6–4	5–3	4th	
2022	Dubuque	6–4	6–2	T–2nd	
2023	Dubuque	5–5	5–3	4th	
Dubuque:		86–56	70–37		
Total:		115–86–2			
National championship Conference title Conference division title or championship game berth
