= 2015 Case Western Reserve Spartans football team =

American college football season

2015 Case Western Reserve Spartans football
- Conference: Presidents' Athletic Conference
- Record: 7–3 (6–2 PAC)
- Head coach: Greg Debeljak (12th season)
- Home stadium: DiSanto Field

2015 Presidents' Athletic Conference football standings
	Conf.			Overall
Team	W		L	W		L
No. 11 Thomas More $^	8	–	0	11	–	1
Westminster (PA)	7	–	1	9	–	2
Washington & Jefferson	6	–	2	8	–	2
Carnegie Mellon	6	–	2	8	–	3
Case Western Reserve	6	–	2	7	–	3
Bethany (WV)	4	–	4	5	–	5
Saint Vincent	3	–	5	4	–	6
Waynesburg	2	–	6	3	–	7
Geneva	1	–	7	2	–	8
Thiel	1	–	7	2	–	8
Grove City	0	–	8	0	–	10
$ – Conference champion; ^ – NCAA Division III playoff participant; Rankings from D3football.com

The 2015 Case Western Reserve Spartans football team represented Case Western Reserve University as a member of the Presidents' Athletic Conference (PAC) during the 2015 NCAA Division III football season. Led by 12th-year head coach Greg Debeljak, the Spartans compiled an overall record of 7–3 with a mark of 6–2 in conference play, tying for third place in the PAC. Case Western Reserved played home games at DiSanto Field in Cleveland.

== Schedule ==
Date	Time	Opponent	Site	Result	Attendance	Source
September 5	12:00 pm	at Chicago*	Stagg Field; Chicago, IL	L 30–31	588	
September 19	7:00 pm	Saint Vincent	DiSanto Field; Cleveland, OH	W 49–14	2,350	
September 26	1:00 pm	at Thiel	Alumni Stadium; Greenville, PA	W 41–6	931	
October 3	2:00 pm	at Bethany (WV)	Bison Stadium; Bethany, WV	W 59–20	1,058	
October 10	1:30 pm	Waynesburg^{†}	DiSanto Field; Cleveland, OH	W 45–14	1,562	
October 17	7:00 pm	at Geneva	Reeves Field; Beaver Falls, PA	W 20–7	3,427	
October 24	6:00 pm	No. 15 Washington & Jefferson	DiSanto Field; Cleveland, OH	W 35–28	1,029	
October 31	12:00 pm	Washington University*	DiSanto Field; Cleveland, OH	W 34–16	819	
November 7	1:00 pm	No. 12 Thomas More	DiSanto Field; Cleveland, OH	L 32–36	2,234	
November 14	2:00 pm	at Carnegie Mellon	Gesling Stadium; Pittsburgh, PA (Academic Bowl)	L 42–52	2,479	
*Non-conference game; ^{†}Homecoming; Rankings from D3Football.com Poll released prior to the game; All times are in Eastern time
