= 2015 Mount Union Purple Raiders football team =

American college football season

2015 Mount Union Purple Raiders football

NCAA Division III champion OAC champion

Stagg Bowl, W 49–35 vs. St. Thomas (MN)
- Conference: Ohio Athletic Conference

Ranking
- AFCA: No. 1
- D3Football.com: No. 1
- Record: 15–0 (9–0 OAC)
- Head coach: Vince Kehres (3rd season)
- Offensive coordinator: Geoff Dartt (3rd season)
- Home stadium: Mount Union Stadium

2015 Ohio Athletic Conference football standings
	Conf.			Overall
Team	W		L	W		L
No. 1 Mount Union $^	9	–	0	15	–	0
No. 22 John Carroll	7	–	2	8	–	2
No. 19 Ohio Northern ^	7	–	2	9	–	3
Baldwin Wallace	7	–	2	7	–	3
Heidelberg	5	–	4	5	–	5
Otterbein	4	–	5	4	–	6
Capital	3	–	6	3	–	7
Marietta	2	–	7	2	–	8
Muskingum	1	–	8	1	–	9
Wilmington (OH)	0	–	9	1	–	9
$ – Conference champion; ^ – NCAA Division III playoff participant; Rankings from D3football.com

The 2015 Mount Union Purple Raiders football team was an American football team that represented the University of Mount Union in the Ohio Athletic Conference (OAC) during the 2015 NCAA Division III football season. In their third year under head coach Vince Kehres, the Purple Raiders compiled a perfect 15–0 record, won the OAC championship, advanced to the NCAA Division III playoffs, and defeated St. Thomas (MN), 49–35, in the national championship game.

The team played its home games at Mount Union Stadium in Alliance, Ohio.

== Schedule ==
Date	Opponent	Site	Result	Attendance	Source
September 5	Bethany*	Mount Union Stadium; Alliance, OH	W 47–0	3,156	
September 19	Muskingum	Mount Union Stadium; Alliance, OH	W 56–0	2,412	
September 26	Marietta	Mount Union Stadium; Alliance, OH	W 61–0	1,531	
October 3	Capital	Mount Union Stadium; Alliance, OH	W 62–7	1,840	
October 10	Ohio Northern^{†}	Mount Union Stadium; Alliance, OH	W 51–7	2,863	
October 17	at Heidelberg	Hoernemann Stadium; Tiffin, OH	W 59–17	2,604	
October 24	at Wilmington (OH)	Williams Stadium; Wilmington, OH	W 69–0	2,100	
October 31	Otterbein	Mount Union Stadium; Alliance, OH	W 55–0	3,128	
November 7	Baldwin Wallace	Mount Union Stadium; Alliance, OH	W 41–0	3,742	
November 14	at John Carroll	Don Shula Stadium; University Heights, OH	W 36–3	4,156	
November 21	St. Lawrence (NY)*	Mount Union Stadium; Alliance, OH (NCAA Division III first round)	W 55–23	1,245	
November 28	Albright*	Mount Union Stadium; Alliance, OH (NCAA Division III second round)	W 66–7	1,258	
December 5	Wesley (DE)*	Mount Union Stadium; Alliance, OH (NCAA Division III quarterfinals)	W 56–35	1,648	
December 12	Wisconsin–Whitewater*	Mount Union Stadium; Alliance, OH (NCAA Division III semifinals)	W 36–6	6,147	
December 18	vs. St. Thomas (MN)*	Salem Football Stadium; Salem, VA (Stagg Bowl)	W 49–35	5,343	
*Non-conference game; ^{†}Homecoming

== Rankings ==
Ranking movements Legend: ██ Increase in ranking ██ Decrease in ranking
	Week												
Poll	Pre	1	2	3	4	5	6	7	8	9	10	11	Final
D3football.com	2	2	2	2	2	2	1	1	1	1	1	1	1
AFCA Coaches	Not released			2	2	2	1	1	1	1	1	1	1
