= Brautigan (surname) =

Brautigan is a surname. Notable people with the surname include:

- Ianthe Elizabeth Brautigan (born 1960), American writer and educator
- Richard Brautigan (1935–1984), American novelist, poet, and short story writer

== See also ==
- Brautigam, another surname
