= 2015 Wisconsin–Whitewater Warhawks football team =

American college football season

2015 Wisconsin–Whitewater Warhawks football

NCAA Division III Semifinal, L 6–36 vs. Mount Union
- Conference: Wisconsin Intercollegiate Athletic Conference

Ranking
- D3Football.com: No. 4
- Record: 12–2 (6–1 WIAC)
- Head coach: Kevin Bullis (1st season)
- Defensive coordinator: Rob Erickson (1st season)
- Home stadium: Perkins Stadium

2015 Wisconsin Intercollegiate Athletic Conference football standings
	Conf.			Overall
Team	W		L	W		L
No. 5 Wisconsin–Oshkosh $^	7	–	0	11	–	2
No. 4 Wisconsin–Whitewater ^	6	–	1	12	–	2
No. 14 Wisconsin–Platteville	5	–	2	8	–	2
Wisconsin–Stevens Point	3	–	4	5	–	5
Wisconsin–River Falls	3	–	4	4	–	6
Wisconsin–La Crosse	2	–	5	3	–	7
Wisconsin–Stout	2	–	5	3	–	7
Wisconsin–Eau Claire	0	–	7	0	–	10
$ – Conference champion; ^ – NCAA Division III playoff participant; Rankings from D3football.com

The 2015 Wisconsin–Whitewater Warhawks football team was an American football team that represented the University of Wisconsin–Whitewater as a member of the Wisconsin Intercollegiate Athletic Conference (WIAC) during the 2015 NCAA Division III football season. Led by first-year head coach Kevin Bullis, the Warhawks compiled an overall record of 12–2 and a mark of 6–1 in conference play, placing second in the WIAC. They advanced to the NCAA Division III Football Championship playoffs, losing in the semifinals to Mount Union, the eventual national champions.

== Schedule ==
Date	Time	Opponent	Site	Result	Attendance	Source
September 12	1:00 p.m.	at Belhaven*	H. T. Newell Field; Jackson, MS	W 62–6	748	
September 19	1:00 p.m.	Finlandia*	Perkins Stadium; Whitewater, WI	W 66–3	6,421	
September 24	6:00 p.m.	at Morningside*	Elwood Olsen Stadium; Sioux City, IA	W 33–30	800	
October 3	1:00 p.m.	Wisconsin–Platteville	Perkins Stadium; Whitewater, WI	W 17–7	15,287	
October 10	1:00 p.m.	at Wisconsin–Oshkosh	Titan Stadium; Oshkosh, WI	L 7–10	2,974	
October 16	7:00 p.m.	Wisconsin–La Crosse	Perkins Stadium; Whitewater, WI	W 30–12	5,127	
October 24	1:00 p.m.	at Wisconsin–Stevens Point	Goerke Field; Stevens Point, WI	W 35–27	1,848	
October 31	1:00 p.m.	Wisconsin–Eau Claire^{†}	Perkins Stadium; Whitewater, WI	W 63–0	3,791	
November 7	1:00 p.m.	at Wisconsin–River Falls	Ramer Field; River Falls, WI	W 42–6	723	
November 14	2:00 p.m.	Wisconsin–Stout	Perkins Stadium; Whitewater, WI	W 63–14	5,145	
November 21	12:00 p.m.	St. Norbert*	Perkins Stadium; Whitewater, WI (NCAA Division III First Round)	W 48–0	963	
November 28	12:00 p.m.	at Wheaton (IL)*	McCully Stadium; Wheaton, IL (NCAA Division III Second Round)	W 31–17	2,052	
December 5	12:00 p.m.	at Wisconsin–Oshkosh*	Titan Stadium; Oshkosh, WI (NCAA Division III Quarterfinal)	W 31–29	5,179	
December 12	11:00 a.m.	at Mount Union*	Mount Union Stadium; Alliance, OH (NCAA Division III Semifinal)	L 6–36	6,147	
*Non-conference game; ^{†}Homecoming; All times are in Central time
