= Helmut Bräutigam =

German composer

Helmut Bräutigam (16 February 1914 – 17 January 1942) was a German composer.

== Life ==
Bräutigam was a son of Paul Bräutigam, who was cantor at the Johanniskirche in Crimmitschau at the time. He began taking instrumental lessons at the age of seven. In the end he was able to play violin, piano, organ, viola, violoncello and some wind instruments. Sometimes he took part in his father's concerts, singing, playing and conducting himself. His real talent was only recognized in 1930, at a concert in the St. Marien (Zwickau) church.

Bräutigam passed the Abitur in 1934 at the Julius-Motteler-Gymnasium Crimmitschau as the best of the year. In the same year he began his music studies at the University of Music and Theatre Leipzig. Among his teachers was Johann Nepomuk David. From 1936 he worked with the youth radio of the Mitteldeutsche Rundfunk AG and the Sächsischen Volksliedarchiv. In 1937 he joined the NSDAP. Since 1938 he was head of the Hitlerjugend-Rundfunkspielschar at the Leipziger Rundfunk. From 1938 to 1939 he also worked as a teacher at the music school for youth and people. On 25 May 1938 his Drei Gesänge für sechsstimmigen Chor nach altgriechischen Dichtungen were first performed within the framework of the Reichsmusiktage by the National Socialist German Students' League. In 1939, Bräutigam was drafted into the Wehrmacht, where he was promoted Singeleiter by the OKW and finally had the rank of a non-commissioned officer. He was in France until the end of 1941, but was transferred to the Eastern Front and took part in the war against the Soviet Union. In January 1942 he was killed in the war in Veliky Novgorod at the age of 27.

== Work ==
Bräutigam created a total of over 480 musical works, mainly in the period between 1930 and his death, as well as poems and extensive collections of folk songs.
