= Hawkeye College Conference =

College sports conference in Iowa, 1914–1917

The Hawkeye College Conference was a short-lived intercollegiate athletic conference that existed from 1914 to 1917. The league had members in the state of Iowa. Some of its members subsequently formed the Iowa Intercollegiate Athletic Association, later known as the Iowa Intercollegiate Athletic Conference and now the American Rivers Conference, in 1922.

== Football champions ==
- 1914 – Unknown
- 1915 – Unknown
- 1916 – Loras and Dubuque
- 1917 – Dubuque

== See also ==
- List of defunct college football conferences
- American Rivers Conference
