= Johan Brautigam =

Dutch trade unionist and politician

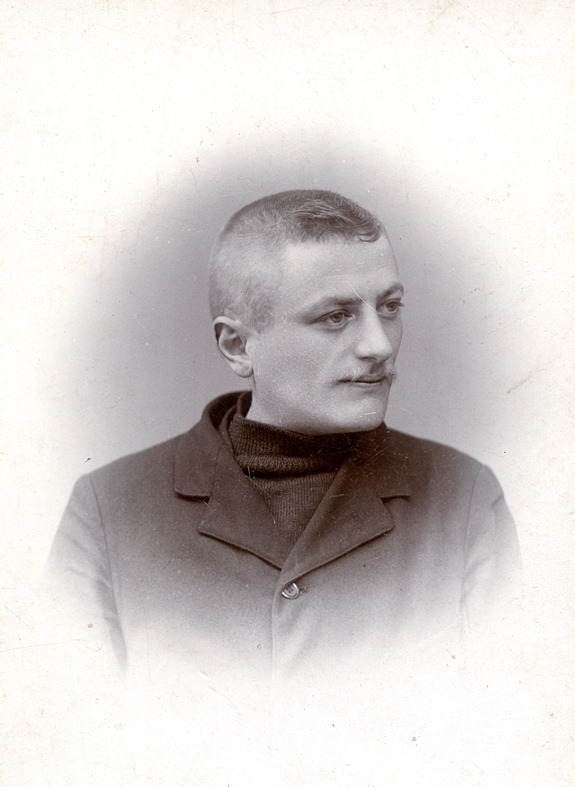
- Johan Brautigam.

Member of the House of Representatives
- In office 1919–1931
- In office 1933–1935

Personal details
- Born: 18 May 1878 Uithoorn
- Died: 24 June 1962 (aged 84) Rotterdam
- Party: SDAP
- Spouse(s): Angenis Geertruij van Beek (m. 1905; div. 1912) Catharina Clasina van Duijn (m. 1912)
- Children: 6

Johan Brautigam (18 May 1878, Uithoorn - 24 June 1962, Rotterdam) was a Dutch trade unionist and politician who served as a member of the House of Representatives for the Social Democratic Workers Party (SDAP) from 1919 to 1931 and from 1933 to 1935.
