= Dubuque Spartans football =

College football team

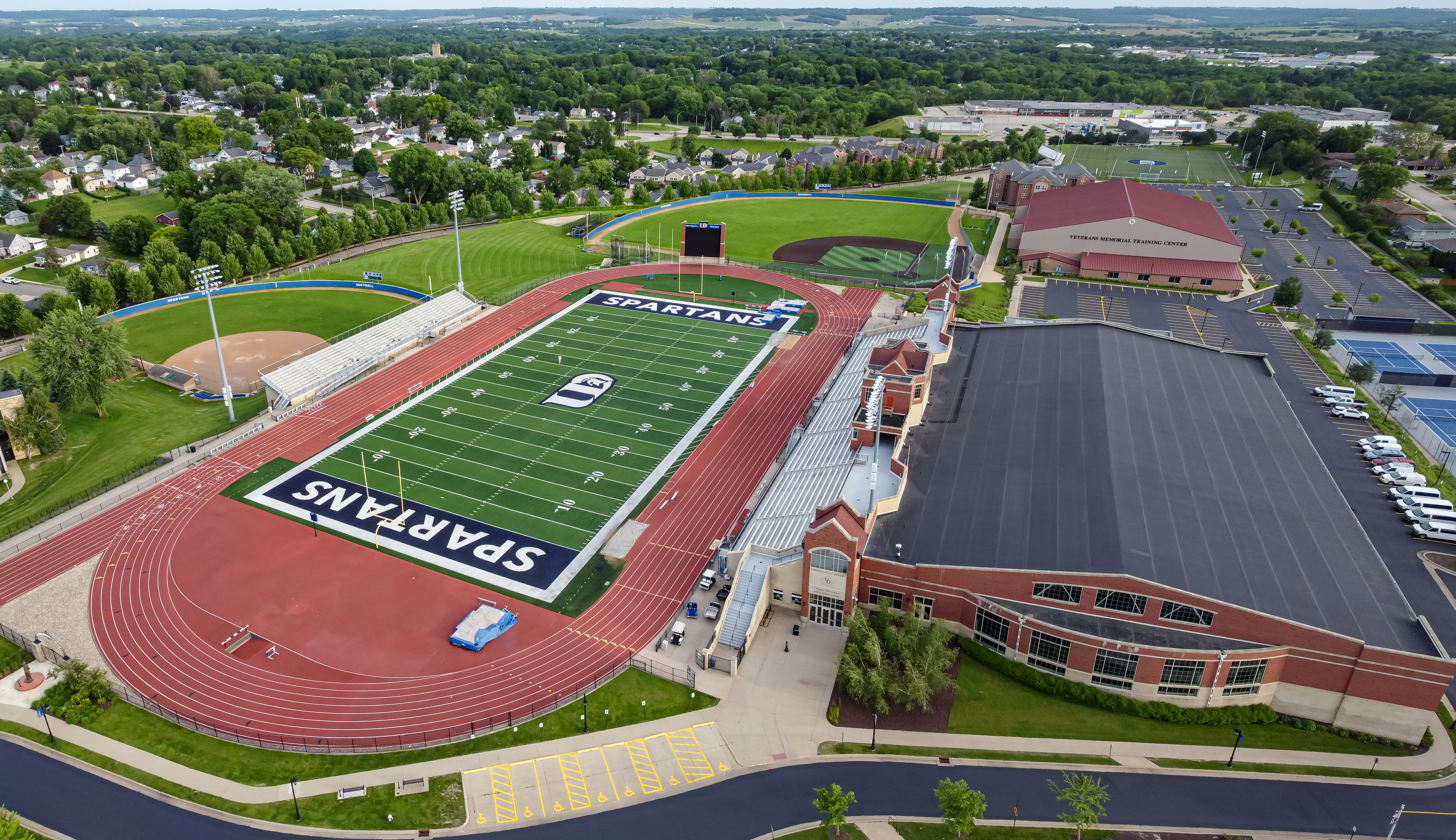
- First season: 1909; 117 years ago
- Athletic director: Dan Runkle
- Head coach: Ryan Maiuri; 2nd season, 9–11 (.450)
- Stadium: Chalmers Field (capacity: 4,000)
- Location: Dubuque, Iowa
- NCAA division: Division III
- Conference: ARC
- All-time record: 387–498–29 (.439)

Conference championships
- 11
- Colors: Blue and white
- Mascot: Spartan
- Website: udspartans.com

The Dubuque Spartans football team represents the University of Dubuque in college football at the NCAA Division III level. The Spartans are members of the American Rivers Conference (ARC), fielding its team in the ARC since 1929 when it was the Iowa Intercollegiate Athletic Conference (IIAC). The Spartans play their home games at Chalmers Field in Dubuque, Iowa.

Their head coach is Ryan Maiuri, who took over the position on December 28, 2023.

== Conference affiliations ==
- Hawkeye College Conference (1914–1917)
- Independent (1918–1924)
- Iowa Intercollegiate Athletic Conference (1929–2017; rebranded)
- American Rivers Conference (2018–present)

== Championships ==
=== Conference championships ===
Dubuque claims 11 conference titles, the most recent of which came in 2015.

Year	Conference	Overall Record	Conference Record	Coach
1915	Hawkeye College Conference	7–0	N/A	John Chalmers
1916	Hawkeye College Conference	5–1	N/A	John Chalmers
1917	Hawkeye College Conference	5–0–1	N/A	John Chalmers
1940	Iowa Intercollegiate Athletic Conference	7–1	7–0	Kenneth E. Mercer
1942	Iowa Intercollegiate Athletic Conference	8–0	8–0	Kenneth E. Mercer
1948†	Iowa Intercollegiate Athletic Conference	7–1	5–0	Kenneth E. Mercer
1978†	Iowa Intercollegiate Athletic Conference	7–2	5–2	Don Birmingham
1979	Iowa Intercollegiate Athletic Conference	9–1	7–0	Don Birmingham
1980	Iowa Intercollegiate Athletic Conference	8–2–1	6–1	Don Birmingham
2011	Iowa Intercollegiate Athletic Conference	9–2	7–1	Stan Zweifel
2015	Iowa Intercollegiate Athletic Conference	8–3	7–0	Stan Zweifel

† Co-champions

== Postseason games ==
=== NCAA Division III playoff games ===
The Spartans have appeared in the Division III playoffs four times with an overall record of 0–4.

Season	Coach	Playoff	Opponent	Result
1979	Don Birmingham	Quarterfinals	Ithaca	L 0–37
1980	Don Birmingham	Quarterfinals	Minnesota Morris	L 35–41
2011	Stan Zweifel	First round	North Central (IL)	L 13–59
2015	Stan Zweifel	First round	Saint John's (MN)	L 7–51

== List of head coaches ==
=== Key ===
Key to symbols in coaches list
General		Overall		Conference		Postseason (Note: Although the first Rose Bowl Game was played in 1902, it has been continuously played since the 1916 game, and is recognized as the oldest bowl game by the NCAA. "—" indicates any season prior to 1916 when postseason games were not played.)	
No.	Order of coaches (Note: A running total of the number of head coaches, with coaches who served separate tenures being counted only once. Interim head coaches are represented with "Int" and are not counted in the running total. "—" indicates the team played but either without a coach or no coach is on record. "X" indicates an interim year without play.)	GC	Games coached	CW	Conference wins	PW	Postseason wins
DC	Division championships	OW	Overall wins	CL	Conference losses	PL	Postseason losses
CC	Conference championships	OL	Overall losses	CT	Conference ties	PT	Postseason ties
NC	National championships	OT	Overall ties (Note: Overtime rules in college football were introduced in 1996, making ties impossible in the period since.)	C%	Conference winning percentage		
†	Elected to the College Football Hall of Fame	O%	Overall winning percentage (Note: When computing the win–loss percentage, a tie counts as half a win and half a loss.)				

=== Coaches ===
List of head football coaches showing season(s) coached, overall records, conference records, postseason records, championships and selected awards
No.	Name	Season(s)	GC	OW	OL	OT	O%	CW	CL	CT	C%	PW	PL	PT	DC	CC	NC	Awards
1	Benson	1909	7	4	2	1	0.643	–	–	–	–	–	–	–	–	–	–	–
2	John Saathoff	1912–1913	9	4	5	0	0.444	–	–	–	–	–	–	–	–	–	–	–
3	John Chalmers	1914–1924	67	41	21	5	0.649	–	–	–	–	–	–	–	–	–	–	–
4	Clarence Peterson	1929–1930	13	3	9	1	0.269	–	–	–	–	–	–	–	–	–	–	–
5	Austin Griffen	1931–1933	20	2	18	0	0.100	–	–	–	–	–	–	–	–	–	–	–
6	John McCaffrie	1934–1936	21	6	13	2	0.333	–	–	–	–	–	–	–	–	–	–	–
7	Paul Fitzke	1937–1938	90	8	5	3	0.594	–	–	–	–	–	–	–	–	–	–	–
8	Kenneth Mercer	1939–1942, 1945–1961	166	95	65	6	0.590	–	–	–	–	–	–	–	–	–	–	–
9	Owen Evans	1962–1968	62	24	33	5	0.427	–	–	–	–	–	–	–	–	–	–	–
10	Maury Waugh	1969–1974	56	16	21	2	0.436	–	–	–	–	–	–	–	–	–	–	–
11	Larry Pohlman	1975–1976	20	4	14	2	0.250	–	–	–	–	–	–	–	–	–	–	–
12	Don Birmingham	1977–1983	69	42	26	1	0.616	–	–	–	–	–	–	–	–	–	–	–
13	Myron Smith	1984–1986	31	5	26	0	0.161	–	–	–	–	–	–	–	–	–	–	–
14	Don Turner	1987–1989	31	13	18	0	0.419	–	–	–	–	–	–	–	–	–	–	–
15	Mike Messer	1990–1993	34	4	30	0	0.118	–	–	–	–	–	–	–	–	–	–	–
16	Don Caves (interim)	1993	8	2	6	0	0.250	–	–	–	–	–	–	–	–	–	–	–
17	Jim Collins	1994–1996	30	4	26	0	0.133	–	–	–	–	–	–	–	–	–	–	–
18	Mike Murray	1997–2000	49	4	45	0	0.082	–	–	–	–	–	–	–	–	–	–	–
19	Vince Brautigam	2001–2008	80	22	58	0	0.275	–	–	–	–	–	–	–	–	–	–	–
20	Stan Zweifel	2009–2023	141	85	56	0	0.603	–	–	–	–	–	–	–	–	–	–	–
20	Ryan Maiuri	2024–present	20	9	11	0	0.450	–	–	–	–	–	–	–	–	–	–	–

== Year-by-year results ==
National champions	Conference champions	Bowl game berth	Playoff berth

Season	Year	Head coach	Association	Division	Conference	Record							Postseason	Final ranking
Season	Year	Head coach	Association	Division	Conference	Overall			Conference				Postseason	Final ranking
Season	Year	Head coach	Association	Division	Conference	Win	Loss	Tie	Finish	Win	Loss	Tie	Postseason	Final ranking
Dubuque Spartans
1909	1909	Benson	IAAUS	—	—	4	2	1					—	—
No team from 1910–1911
1912	1912	John Saathoff	NCAA	—	—	2	2	0					—	—
1913	1913	John Saathoff	NCAA	—	—	2	3	0					—	—
1914	1914	John Chalmers	NCAA	—	HCC	1	1	0					—	—
1915	1915	John Chalmers	NCAA	—	HCC	7	0	0					Conference champions	—
1916	1916	John Chalmers	NCAA	—	HCC	5	1	0					Conference champions	—
1917	1917	John Chalmers	NCAA	—	HCC	5	0	1					Conference champions	—
1918	1918	John Chalmers	NCAA	—	Independent	2	1	1					—	—
1919	1919	John Chalmers	NCAA	—	Independent	6	1	0					—	—
1920	1920	John Chalmers	NCAA	—	Independent	4	1	1					—	—
1921	1921	John Chalmers	NCAA	—	Independent	4	2	1					—	—
1922	1922	John Chalmers	NCAA	—	Independent	3	4	0					—	—
1923	1923	John Chalmers	NCAA	—	Independent	3	4	1					—	—
1924	1924	John Chalmers	NCAA	—	Independent	1	6	0					—	—
No team from 1925–1928
1929	1929	Clarence Peterson	NCAA	—	IIAC	1	4	1		0	2	0	—	—
1930	1930	Clarence Peterson	NCAA	—	IIAC	2	5	0		0	5	0	—	—
1931	1931	Austin Griffen	NCAA	—	IIAC	0	7	0		0	4	0	—	—
1932	1932	Austin Griffen	NCAA	—	IIAC	1	5	0		0	3	0	—	—
1933	1933	Austin Griffen	NCAA	—	IIAC	1	6	0		0	3	0	—	—
1934	1934	John McCaffrie	NCAA	—	IIAC	2	3	1		0	2	1	—	—
1935	1935	John McCaffrie	NCAA	—	IIAC	3	4	0		2	2	0	—	—
1936	1936	John McCaffrie	NCAA	—	IIAC	1	6	1		0	6	0	—	—
1937	1937	Paul Fitzke	NCAA	—	IIAC	3	4	1	3rd	3	1	1	—	—
1938	1938	Paul Fitzke	NCAA	—	IIAC	5	1	2	4th	4	1	0	—	—
1939	1939	Kenneth E. Mercer	NCAA	—	IIAC	4	4	0	4th	4	2	0	—	—
1940	1940	Kenneth E. Mercer	NCAA	—	IIAC	7	1	0	1st	7	0	0	Conference champions	—
1941	1941	Kenneth E. Mercer	NCAA	—	IIAC	6	1	1	3rd	6	1	1	—	—
1942	1942	Kenneth E. Mercer	NCAA	—	IIAC	8	0	0	1st	8	0	0	Conference champions	—
No team from 1943–1944
1945	1945	Kenneth E. Mercer	NCAA	—	IIAC	4	2	0	T-4th	2	2	0	—	—
1946	1946	Kenneth E. Mercer	NCAA	—	IIAC	5	4	0	5th	4	3	0	—	—
1947	1947	Kenneth E. Mercer	NCAA	—	IIAC	5	2	0	5th	4	1	0	—	—
1948	1948	Kenneth E. Mercer	NCAA	—	IIAC	7	1	0	T-1st	5	0	0	Conference champions	—
1949	1949	Kenneth E. Mercer	NCAA	—	IIAC	6	2	0	2nd	4	1	0	—	—
1950	1950	Kenneth E. Mercer	NCAA	—	IIAC	3	5	0	T-4th	1	4	0	—	—
1951	1951	Kenneth E. Mercer	NCAA	—	IIAC	3	4	0	T-2nd	3	2	0	—	—
1952	1952	Kenneth E. Mercer	NCAA	—	IIAC	4	4	0	2nd	3	1	0	—	—
1953	1953	Kenneth E. Mercer	NCAA	—	IIAC	4	3	0	3rd	2	2	0	—	—
1954	1954	Kenneth E. Mercer	NCAA	—	IIAC	4	3	1	3rd	4	1	1	—	—
1955	1955	Kenneth E. Mercer	NCAA	—	IIAC	2	5	0	6th	2	4	0	—	—
1956	1956	Kenneth E. Mercer	NCAA	College Division	IIAC	3	3	2	T-5th	3	3	2	—	—
1957	1957	Kenneth E. Mercer	NCAA	College Division	IIAC	1	5	2	8th	1	5	2	—	—
1958	1958	Kenneth E. Mercer	NCAA	College Division	IIAC	5	4	0	T-4th	4	4	0	—	—
1959	1959	Kenneth E. Mercer	NCAA	College Division	IIAC	5	4	0	5th	4	4	0	—	—
1960	1960	Kenneth E. Mercer	NCAA	College Division	IIAC	4	4	0	5th	4	4	0	—	—
1961	1961	Kenneth E. Mercer	NCAA	College Division	IIAC	5	4	0	5th	4	4	0	—	—
1962	1962	Owen Evans	NCAA	College Division	IIAC	2	7	0	8th	2	7	0	—	—
1963	1963	Owen Evans	NCAA	College Division	IIAC	3	4	1	5th	3	4	1	—	—
1964	1964	Owen Evans	NCAA	College Division	IIAC	3	5	1	T-5th	3	5	0	—	—
1965	1965	Owen Evans	NCAA	College Division	IIAC	6	2	1	3rd	5	2	0	—	—
1966	1966	Owen Evans	NCAA	College Division	IIAC	5	4	0	5th	3	4	0	—	—
1967	1967	Owen Evans	NCAA	College Division	IIAC	1	6	2	7th	1	4	2	—	—
1968	1968	Owen Evans	NCAA	College Division	IIAC	4	5	0	5th	3	4	0	—	—
1969	1969	Maury Waugh	NCAA	College Division	IIAC	1	7	0	8th	0	7	0	—	—
1970	1970	Maury Waugh	NCAA	College Division	IIAC	2	7	0	6th	2	5	0	—	—
1971	1971	Maury Waugh	NCAA	College Division	IIAC	1	7	1	7th	0	6	1	—	—
1972	1972	Maury Waugh	NCAA	College Division	IIAC	5	4	1	4th	3	3	1	—	—
1973	1973	Maury Waugh	NCAA	Division III	IIAC	5	4	1	4th	3	3	1	—	—
1974	1974	Maury Waugh	NCAA	Division III	IIAC	2	8	0	7th	1	6	0	—	—
1975	1975	Larry Pohlman	NCAA	Division III	IIAC	3	5	2		3	4	0	—	—
1976	1976	Larry Pohlman	NCAA	Division III	IIAC	1	9	0		1	6	0	—	—
1977	1977	Don Birmingham	NCAA	Division III	IIAC	4	6	0	T-6th	2	5	0	—	—
1978	1978	Don Birmingham	NCAA	Division III	IIAC	7	2	0	T-1st	5	2	0	Conference champions	—
1979	1979	Don Birmingham	NCAA	Division III	IIAC	9	1	0	1st	7	0	0	Playoff berth	—
1980	1980	Don Birmingham	NCAA	Division III	IIAC	8	2	1	1st	6	1	0	Playoff berth	—
1981	1981	Don Birmingham	NCAA	Division III	IIAC	4	6	0	4th	4	3	0	—	—
1982	1982	Don Birmingham	NCAA	Division III	IIAC	6	3	0	4th	4	3	0	—	—
1983	1983	Don Birmingham	NCAA	Division III	IIAC	4	6	0	T-4th	3	4	0	—	—
1984	1984	Myron Smith	NCAA	Division III	IIAC	3	7	0		2	5	0	—	—
1985	1985	Myron Smith	NCAA	Division III	IIAC	0	10	0		0		0	—	—
1986	1986	Myron Smith	NCAA	Division III	IIAC	2	9	0		2	6	0	—	—
1987	1987	Don Turner	NCAA	Division III	IIAC	6	5	0	T-4th	4	4	0	—	—
1988	1988	Don Turner	NCAA	Division III	IIAC	3	7	0	T-6th	3	5	0	—	—
1989	1989	Don Turner	NCAA	Division III	IIAC	4	6	0	T-6th	3	5	0	—	—
1990	1990	Mike Messer	NCAA	Division III	IIAC	2	7	0					—	—
1991	1991	Mike Messer	NCAA	Division III	IIAC	1	8	0					—	—
1992	1992	Mike Messer	NCAA	Division III	IIAC	1	9	0					—	—
1993	1993	Mike Messer (games 1–2) / Don Caves (remainder)	NCAA	Division III	IIAC	2	8	0					—	—
1994	1994	Jim Collins	NCAA	Division III	IIAC	1	9	0	8th	1	7	0	—	—
1995	1995	Jim Collins	NCAA	Division III	IIAC	2	8	0	T-6th	2	6	0	—	—
1996	1996	Jim Collins	NCAA	Division III	IIAC	1	9	0	9th	0	8	0	—	—
1997	1997	Mike Murray	NCAA	Division III	IIAC	3	7	0					—	—
1998	1998	Mike Murray	NCAA	Division III	IIAC	0	10	0					—	—
1999	1999	Mike Murray	NCAA	Division III	IIAC	1	9	0					—	—
2000	2000	Mike Murray	NCAA	Division III	IIAC	0	10	0					—	—
2001	2001	Vince Brautigam	NCAA	Division III	IIAC	2	8	0	10th	1	8	0	—	—
2002	2002	Vince Brautigam	NCAA	Division III	IIAC	1	9	0	10th	0	9	0	—	—
2003	2003	Vince Brautigam	NCAA	Division III	IIAC	0	10	0	10th	0	8	0	—	—
2004	2004	Vince Brautigam	NCAA	Division III	IIAC	2	8	0	T-8th	1	7	0	—	—
2005	2005	Vince Brautigam	NCAA	Division III	IIAC	2	8	0	T-8th	1	7	0	—	—
2006	2006	Vince Brautigam	NCAA	Division III	IIAC	6	4	0	T-3rd	5	3	0	—	—
2007	2007	Vince Brautigam	NCAA	Division III	IIAC	7	3	0	T-3rd	5	3	0	—	—
2008	2008	Vince Brautigam	NCAA	Division III	IIAC	2	8	0	8th	1	7	0	—	—
2009	2009	Stan Zweifel	NCAA	Division III	IIAC	5	5	0	T-5th	4	4	0	—	—
2010	2010	Stan Zweifel	NCAA	Division III	IIAC	4	6	0	6th	3	5	0	—	—
2011	2011	Stan Zweifel	NCAA	Division III	IIAC	9	2	0	1st	7	1	0	Playoff berth	—
2012	2012	Stan Zweifel	NCAA	Division III	IIAC	5	5	0	T-2nd	4	3	0	—	—
2013	2013	Stan Zweifel	NCAA	Division III	IIAC	5	5	0	T-3rd	4	3	0	—	—
2014	2014	Stan Zweifel	NCAA	Division III	IIAC	4	6	0	5th	3	4	0	—	—
2015	2015	Stan Zweifel	NCAA	Division III	IIAC	8	3	0	1st	7	0	0	Playoff berth	—
2016	2016	Stan Zweifel	NCAA	Division III	IIAC	8	2	0	T-2nd	6	3	0	—	—
2017	2017	Stan Zweifel	NCAA	Division III	IIAC	6	4	0	T-4th	4	4	0	—	—
2018	2018	Stan Zweifel	NCAA	Division III	A-R-C	7	3	0	T-2nd	6	2	0	—	—
2019	2019	Stan Zweifel	NCAA	Division III	A-R-C	7	3	0	3rd	6	2	0	—	—
2020–21	2020–21	Stan Zweifel	NCAA	Division III	A-R-C	1	0	0	T-2nd	1	0	0		
2021	2021	Stan Zweifel	NCAA	Division III	A-R-C	6	4	0	4th	5	3	0	—	—
2022	2022	Stan Zweifel	NCAA	Division III	A-R-C	6	4	0	T-2nd	6	2	0	—	—
2023	2023	Stan Zweifel	NCAA	Division III	A-R-C	5	5	0	4th	5	3	0	—	—
2024	2024	Ryan Maiuri	NCAA	Division III	A-R-C	5	5	0	4th	5	3	0	—	—
2025	2025	Ryan Maiuri	NCAA	Division III	A-R-C	4	6	0	5th	4	4	0	—	—
