= University of Dubuque =

Private university in Dubuque, Iowa, US

- Former name: List: German Theological College and Seminary (1852–1864); The German Theological School of The North West (1864–1911); German Presbyterian Theological School (1911–1916); Dubuque Theological German College and Seminary (1911–1916); Dubuque College and Seminary (1916–1920); Dubuque College (1916–1920)
- Motto: Mancherlei Gaben und Ein Geist (German) (1 Corinthians 12:4)
- Motto in English: Many Gifts and One Spirit
- Type: Private university
- Established: 1852; 174 years ago
- Religious affiliation: Presbyterian Church (USA)
- Endowment: $370.9 million (2025)
- President: Travis L. Frampton, PhD
- Students: 2,190
- Location: Dubuque, Iowa, U.S. 42.498460°N 90.692194°W
- Campus: 77 acres (31 ha); Urban
- Colors: Blue & white
- Nickname: Spartans
- Mascot: Sparty the Spartan
- Website: dbq.edu
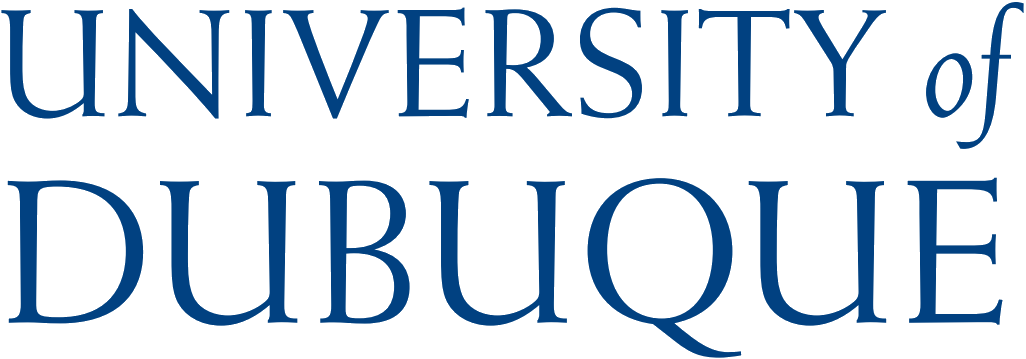

The University of Dubuque (UD) is a private Presbyterian university in Dubuque, Iowa, United States. About 2,200 students attend the university.

== History ==
The University of Dubuque has had a long history in Dubuque since its founding in 1852.

=== Early years ===
Adrian Van Vliet founded the 'German Theological College and Seminary', the initial predecessor to the University of Dubuque, in 1852. Van Vliet, who was pastor of the German Presbyterian Church (now known as the First Presbyterian Church of Dubuque), wanted to train ministers to serve the influx of immigrants to the upper midwest. Van Vliet believed the large number of immigrants—particularly German farmers and miners—would need ministers of the gospel for the communities they were establishing. He began by training two young men, conducting classes in his home. Although Van Vliet was Dutch, until 1896 all classes were conducted in German.

Initially the school was Van Vliet's independent endeavor. In 1864, the Presbytery of Dubuque assumed control of the institution, and it became known as 'The German Theological School of The North West'. In 1870 the Presbyterian Church of the United States took control of the school. In 1871, following the death of Van Vliet, Jacob Conzett was selected to lead the school. In 1872 the school moved to a brick building on the north side of 17th street, where it would remain for the next 35 years.

In 1901 Cornelius Martin Steffens came on board as financial secretary. He proved to be an outstanding fund raiser. He also helped the school expand its curriculum. A liberal arts college and academy were added to the school, and the first college degrees were granted in 1906. It was Steffens's idea to move the school to larger quarters. Property on the western edge of the city was acquired in 1905 for that purpose. Steffens served as school president from 1908 to 1924.

The school moved to its present location on University Avenue in 1907. The first buildings constructed at this new location were the Administration Building (1907, later renamed Steffens Hall), Severance Hall (1911), the University Bookstore (1912), McCormick Gymnasium (1915), Peters Commons (1916), and Van Vliet Hall (1926). All except Steffens Hall are still standing. Steffens Hall was demolished in 1980 and replaced with Blades Hall, but some of its archways were preserved and can be seen today.

In 1911, the college became coeducational and changed names to the 'Dubuque Theological German College and Seminary' (alternatively the 'German Presbyterian Theological School'). In 1916, the school dropped the word "German" from its name, due in part to anti-German sentiment inflamed by the First World War, and became just 'Dubuque College'. This caused controversy, however, because this was also the name of an existing college, the Catholic school now known as Loras College. After a series of court causes leading up to 1920, neither school ultimately kept the name: the preexisting Catholic school took the name of Mathias Loras, first archbishop of Dubuque while the Presbyterian school became the University of Dubuque on June 17.

=== Expansion ===
In the 1950s and 60s, during the administration of Gaylord Couchman, a number of building projects took place: the Seminary Library (1955), Smith Hall, a seminary residence (1956), Goldthorp Science Hall (1959), Aitchison Hall, a women's residence (1963), Ficke-Laird Library (1966), Cassat Hall, a men's residence (1966), and Donnell Hall, another men's residence (1967).

McCormick Gymnasium was expanded in 1967. Another large addition to it, named the Stoltz Sports Center, was made later. The original building was also renovated to include a new indoor swimming pool, racquetball courts, a hall of fame, and a multi-purpose area.

=== Controversy, change, and new leadership ===
In 1999, the university informed 14 professors, 10 of whom held tenured positions, that they would lose their positions due to a financial crisis. A report by The American Association of University Professors raised concerns about this action, and the AAUP placed the university on its list of censured administrations, where it still remains. The university was granted a provisional six-year accreditation by the North Central Association of Colleges and Secondary Schools due to concerns about academics in the wake of the financial crisis. In 2005, however, the university was granted a full accreditation after a lengthy review process.

In 2003, the university received an endowment to implement the Lester G. Wendt and Michael Lester Wendt Character Initiative, currently overseen by the Wendt Center for Character Education, which among other tasks encourages ethical character development of university students and integration of the same into the university curriculum. Also associated with the Wendt name was a Wendt University Professorship, granted in 2005 to Paul Jeffries, a professor of philosophy. (This is not Paul C. Jeffries, who also has a Ph.D. in philosophy, who used to be in academia but now works in technology.) As the Wendt professor, Jeffries was to oversee the initiative and "speak broadly" about it in the university and external community.

During the same year, Jeffries came up for a new tenure contract. The university offered him a contract, but he objected to a provision restricting negative speech about the university, which he felt could interfere with his objectivity in speaking about ethics and character. The offer of tenure was immediately revoked and Jeffries was dismissed from the university, an action that stirred considerable unrest among students and faculty.

=== Continued development ===
The university has completed building additional student housing on land adjacent to Dodge Street, the main east–west thoroughfare through the city. This property remained vacant for many years until the new apartments were built. Park Village apartments are typically only available to upperclassmen. The university currently has approximately 2,000 students in attendance.

== Academics ==
The University of Dubuque consists of a Theological Seminary and three schools:

- School of Business
- School of Liberal Arts
- School of Professional Programs

The university is accredited by the Higher Learning Commission, the Council on Aviation Accreditation, and the Association of Theological Schools. It is also approved by the Iowa Department of Education.

== Athletics ==
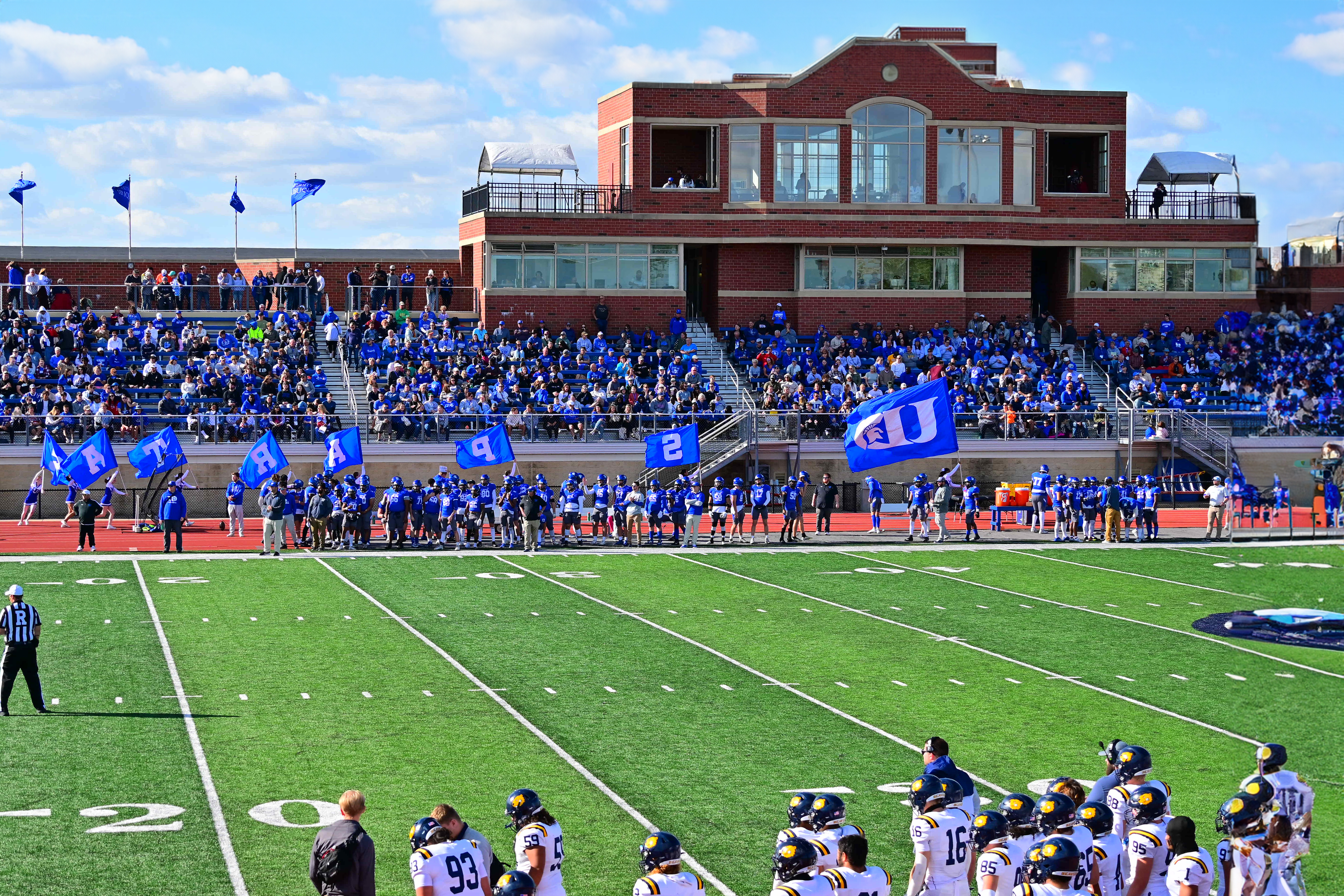
Chalmers Field, home of the Dubuque Spartans football team

The school has been involved in intercollegiate sports for many decades. The teams are called the Spartans, and the school colors are blue and white. There was a brief period, from 1925 to 1928, when the university withdrew from intercollegiate sports and focused on intramural competition. This was done because University president Karl Wettstone was opposed to the commercialization of sports and the recruiting of athletes with offers of free tuition, room, and board. There also were concerns about the salaries some coaches had received, which were felt to be excessive compared to the compensation paid other department heads. Following the reinstatement of intercollegiate competition, the University of Dubuque joined the Iowa Conference, now known as the American Rivers Conference, in 1929.

The University of Dubuque is a member of NCAA Division III, and is part of the American Rivers Conference, which, in addition to the University of Dubuque, currently includes Buena Vista University, Coe College, Central College, Luther College, Loras College, Nebraska Wesleyan University, Simpson College, and Wartburg College. Men's varsity sports include football, baseball, basketball, cross-country, golf, ice hockey, lacrosse, soccer, tennis, indoor and outdoor track, and wrestling. Women's varsity sports include basketball, cross country, golf, ice hockey, lacrosse, soccer, softball, track, tennis, and volleyball.

In 2008, the school officially recognized its first club sports team, ice hockey. Students now have the opportunity to participate in a sport against other conference rivals including Loras and Cornell college while attending the University of Dubuque. A recent addition to club sport includes a campus Bass Fishing team which is one of the top-ranked in the country.

== Notable alumni ==
Notable graduates of the University of Dubuque include Walter Soboleff, a Tlingit scholar, elder, and religious leader who was the first Native Alaskan to become an ordained Presbyterian minister; Solomon "Sol" Butler, a track star who set national and world records, competed in the 1920s Olympics, and was one of the first black players in the National Football League as well as an early actor in Hollywood films; actor Tony Danza, a star of the TV sitcoms Taxi and Who's the Boss?; and novelist Eckhard Gerdes, author of thirteen published novels, including My Landlady the Lobotomist and Hugh Moore.

== Transportation ==
The university is located west of downtown Dubuque and served by The Jule transit system. The Grey Route and AM Commuter West Route stop on University Avenue at the north edge of campus. Lamers Bus Lines stops at Blade Hall providing intercity bus service towards Madison and Milwaukee.

== Gallery ==
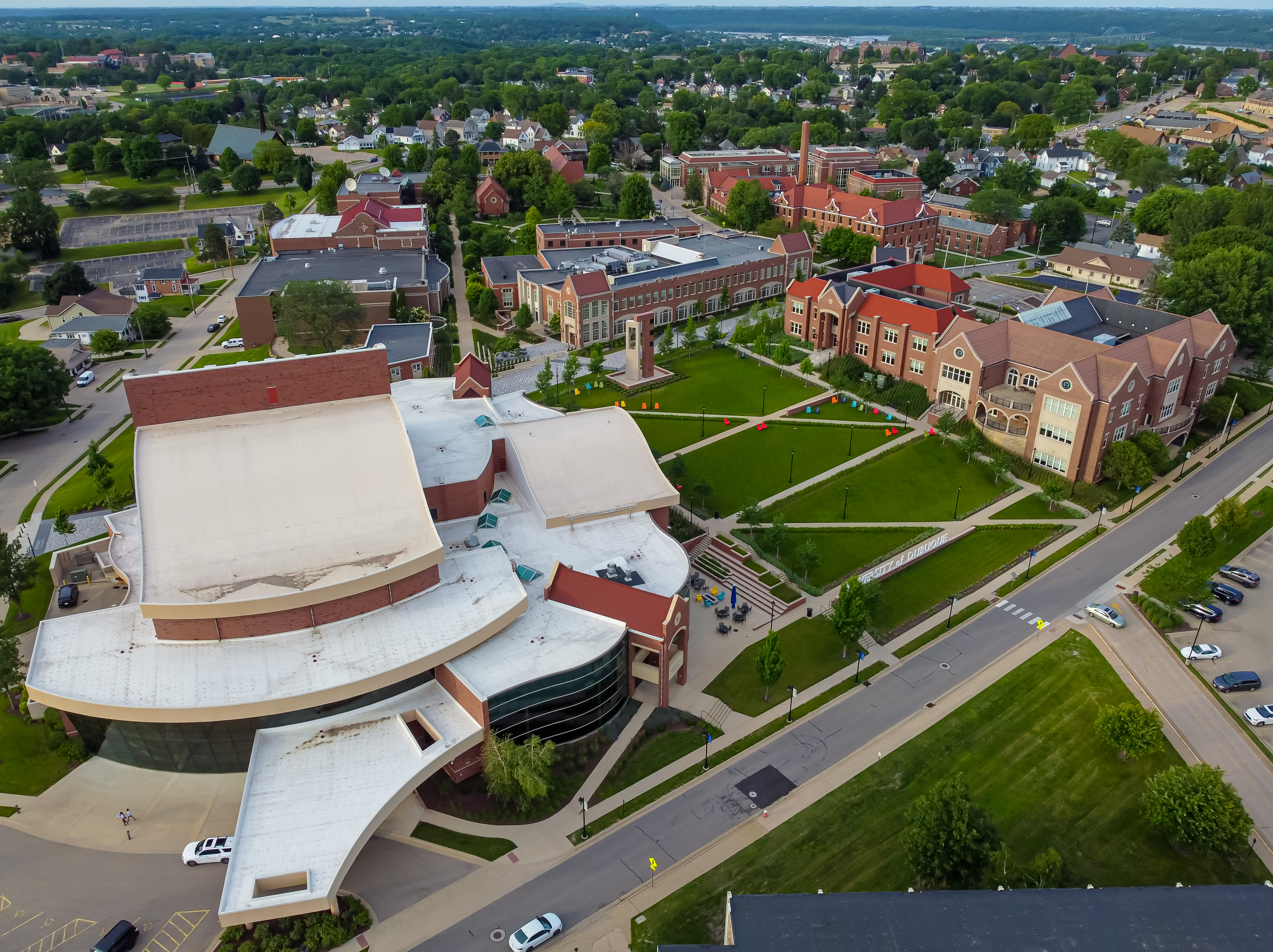
Aerial view of the campus

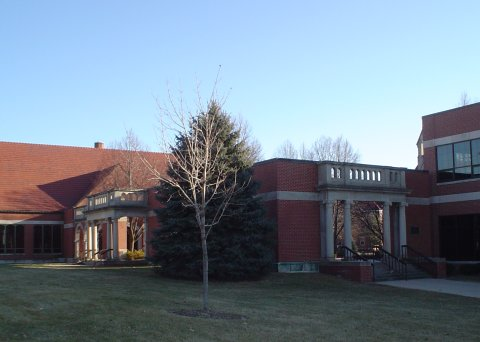
The arches from the former Steffens Hall. Blades Hall and the Dunlap Technology building are also visible

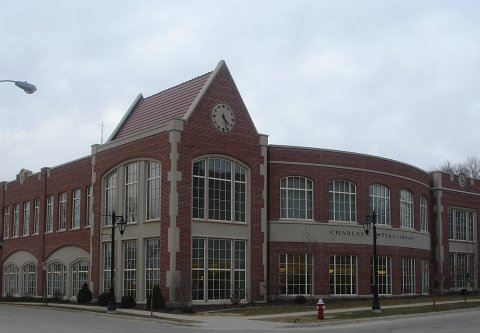
Charles C. Myers Library

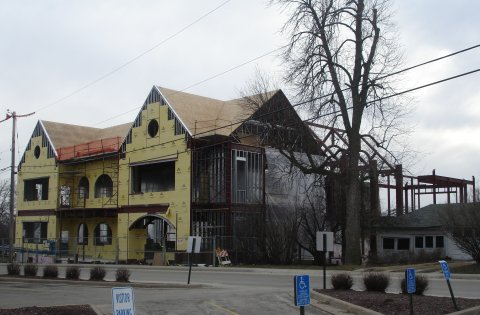
Meyers Teaching and Administrative Center under construction

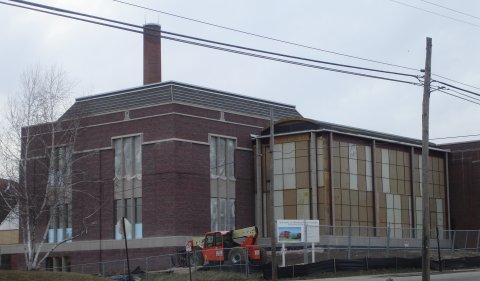
The new portion of the Goldthorp Science Hall, under construction in March 2006

== See also ==
- Dubuque, Iowa
- Presbyterian Church (USA)
