= List of Atlantic Central Football Conference standings =

This is a list of yearly Atlantic Central Football Conference standings.

== Atlantic Central Football Conference standings ==
1998 Atlantic Central Football Conference standings
	Conf.			Overall
Team	W		L	W		L
Wesley $	3	–	0	7	–	3
Methodist	3	–	1	7	–	3
Frostburg State	2	–	2	7	–	3
Chowan	2	–	3	5	–	5
Ferrum	2	–	3	6	–	4
Salisbury State	1	–	4	3	–	7
$ – Conference champion

1999 Atlantic Central Football Conference standings
	Conf.			Overall
Team	W		L	W		L
Frostburg State $	5	–	1	8	–	3
Ferrum	4	–	2	6	–	4
Wesley	4	–	2	6	–	4
Chowan	2	–	4	5	–	4
Greensboro	2	–	4	3	–	6
Methodist	2	–	4	3	–	7
Salisbury State	2	–	4	2	–	7
$ – Conference champion

2000 Atlantic Central Football Conference standings
	Conf.			Overall
Team	W		L	W		L
Wesley $^	6	–	0	9	–	2
Ferrum	4	–	2	6	–	4
Methodist	4	–	2	6	–	4
Salisbury State	3	–	3	5	–	5
Frostburg State	3	–	3	4	–	6
Greensboro	1	–	5	5	–	5
Chowan	0	–	6	2	–	7
$ – Conference champion; ^ – NCAA Division III playoff participant

2001 Atlantic Central Football Conference standings
	Conf.			Overall
Team	W		L	W		L
Wesley $	3	–	0	7	–	3
Frostburg State	2	–	1	4	–	5
Salisbury	1	–	2	4	–	6
Apprentice §	0	–	3	2	–	7
$ – Conference champion; § – Not an NCAA member

2002 Atlantic Central Football Conference standings
	Conf.			Overall
Team	W		L	W		L
Frostburg State $	3	–	0	6	–	5
Salisbury ^	2	–	1	9	–	2
Wesley	1	–	2	5	–	5
Apprentice §	0	–	3	5	–	5
$ – Conference champion; ^ – NCAA Division III playoff participant; § – Not an NCAA member

2003 Atlantic Central Football Conference standings
	Conf.			Overall
Team	W		L	W		L
Frostburg State $	3	–	0	4	–	5
Salisbury	2	–	1	7	–	2
Wesley	1	–	2	6	–	4
Apprentice §	0	–	3	1	–	8
$ – Conference champion; § – Not an NCAA member

2004 Atlantic Central Football Conference standings
	Conf.			Overall
Team	W		L	W		L
Salisbury $^	5	–	0	10	–	1
Wesley	4	–	1	8	–	2
Brockport	3	–	2	6	–	4
Buffalo State	2	–	3	4	–	6
Frostburg State	1	–	4	2	–	8
Apprentice §	0	–	5	3	–	7
$ – Conference champion; ^ – NCAA Division III playoff participant; § – Not an NCAA member

2005 Atlantic Central Football Conference standings
	Conf.			Overall
Team	W		L	W		L
No. 10 Wesley +^	4	–	1	12	–	2
Salisbury +	4	–	1	8	–	3
Brockport +	4	–	1	5	–	5
Frostburg State	1	–	4	6	–	5
Apprentice §	1	–	4	4	–	6
Buffalo State	1	–	4	3	–	6
+ – Conference co-champions; ^ – NCAA Division III playoff participant; § – Not an NCAA member; Rankings from D3football.com

2006 Atlantic Central Football Conference standings
	Conf.			Overall
Team	W		L	W		L
No. 7 Wesley $^	4	–	0	13	–	1
Apprentice §	2	–	2	7	–	3
Salisbury	2	–	2	6	–	5
Brockport	2	–	2	4	–	6
Frostburg State	0	–	4	2	–	7
$ – Conference champion; ^ – NCAA Division III playoff participant; § – Not an NCAA member; Rankings from D3football.com

2007 Atlantic Central Football Conference standings
	Conf.			Overall
Team	W		L	W		L
No. 5 Wesley $^	4	–	0	11	–	2
No. 14 Salisbury ^	3	–	1	9	–	2
Brockport	2	–	2	5	–	5
Apprentice §	1	–	3	4	–	6
Frostburg State	0	–	4	2	–	7
$ – Conference champion; ^ – NCAA Division III playoff participant; § – Not an NCAA member; Rankings from D3football.com

2008 Atlantic Central Football Conference standings
	Conf.			Overall
Team	W		L	W		L
No. 13 Wesley $^	3	–	0	9	–	2
No. 24 Salisbury	2	–	1	9	–	2
Frostburg State	1	–	2	3	–	6
Apprentice §	0	–	3	2	–	7
$ – Conference champion; ^ – NCAA Division III playoff participant; § – Not an NCAA member; Rankings from D3football.com

2009 Atlantic Central Football Conference standings
	Conf.			Overall
Team	W		L	W		L
No. 4 Wesley $^	3	–	0	13	–	1
Salisbury	2	–	1	5	–	6
Frostburg State	1	–	2	1	–	9
Apprentice §	0	–	3	1	–	9
$ – Conference champion; ^ – NCAA Division III playoff participant; § – Not an NCAA member; Rankings from D3football.com

2010 Atlantic Central Football Conference standings
	Conf.			Overall
Team	W		L	W		L
No. 4 Wesley $^	3	–	0	12	–	1
Salisbury ^	2	–	1	7	–	3
Frostburg State	1	–	2	2	–	8
Apprentice §	0	–	3	2	–	8
$ – Conference champion; ^ – NCAA Division III playoff participant; § – Not an NCAA member; Rankings from D3football.com
