= 1993 Frostburg State Bobcats football team =

American college football season

1993 Frostburg State Bobcats football

NCAA Division III Quarterfinal, L 7–28 at Washington & Jefferson
- Conference: Independent
- Record: 10–2
- Head coach: Mike McGlinchey (2nd season)
- Offensive coordinator: Paul Barnes (7th season)
- Offensive scheme: Wing T
- Defensive coordinator: Rubin Stevenson (2nd season)

1993 NCAA Division III independents football records
	Conf.			Overall
Team	W	L	T	W		L		T
Union (NY) ^		–		9	–	1	–	0
Colorado College		–		8	–	1	–	0
Frostburg State ^		–		10	–	2	–	0
Wesley		–		7	–	3	–	1
Brockport		–		7	–	4	–	0
Albany		–		6	–	4	–	0
Buffalo State ^		–		6	–	4	–	0
Ithaca		–		6	–	4	–	0
Maryville (TN)		–		6	–	4	–	0
Hartwick		–		4	–	3	–	1
Ferrum		–		5	–	4	–	0
Aurora		–		4	–	5	–	0
Alfred		–		4	–	6	–	0
Methodist		–		4	–	6	–	0
Salisbury State		–		2	–	7	–	0
St. Lawrence		–		2	–	8	–	0
Catholic University		–		1	–	9	–	0
Cortland		–		1	–	9	–	0
Menlo		–		0	–	8	–	1
^ – NCAA Division III playoff participant

The 1993 Frostburg State Bobcats football team was an American football team that represented Frostburg State University, as an independent during the 1993 NCAA Division III football season. In their second year under head coach Mike McGlinchey, the Bobcats compiled a 10–2 record, outscored opponents by a total of 330 to 176, and made it to the semifinal in the NCAA Division III playoffs where they lost to Washington & Jefferson, 28–7. The team played its home games at Bobcat Stadium in Frostburg, Maryland.

The team was led by quarterback Gil Telleria who finished the season with 1,494 passing yards, twelve touchdowns, and eight interceptions.

Ten days before the season, 26-year-old assistant coach Lawren Williams died from injuries sustained in a car accident.

== Schedule ==
Date	Opponent	Site	Result	Attendance	Source
September 11	at Alfred	Yunevich Stadium; Alfred, NY	W 33–31	4,127	
September 18	Thiel	Bobcat Stadium; Frostburg, MD	W 34–12	2,800	
September 25	at Salisbury State	Sea Gull Stadium; Salisbury, MD	W 34–21	1,285	
October 2	Chowan	Bobcat Stadium; Frostburg, MD	W 28–0	4,000	
October 9	Trenton State	Bobcat Stadium; Frostburg, MD	W 27–16	4,400	
October 16	Wesley (DE)	Bobcat Stadium; Frostburg, MD	W 35–26	1,000	
October 23	at Bridgewater	Bridgewater Stadium; Bridgewater, VA	W 35–0	3,000	
October 30	at Brockport	Special Olympics Stadium; Brockport, NY	W 36–23	1,530	
November 6	Waynesburg	Bobcat Stadium; Frostburg, MD	L 22–24	1,250	
November 13	at Methodist	Monarch Stadium; Fayetteville, NC	W 47–23	1,000	
November 20	at Wilkes	Ralston Field; Edwardsville, PA (NCAA Division III Regional)	W 26–25		
November 27	Washington & Jefferson	Bobcat Stadium; Frostburg, MD (NCAA Division III Quarterfinal)	L 7–28		

== Roster ==
1993 Frostburg State Bobcats football team roster
Players
Coaches
Offense

Pos.	#	Name	Class
FB	1	Kermit Nored	So
QB	14	Gil Telleria	Jr
HB	19	Kevin Bellamy	Sr
HB	35	Shawn Freeman	So
C	51	Bryan Solesha	So
OT	65	Tim Feldman	Jr
OT	70	Mo Cifuentes	Jr
G	74	Mike Mazzola	Jr
G	78	Scott Willett	Jr
TE	85	John Walter	Jr
SE	87	Jimmy Trapani	Sr

Defense

Pos.	#	Name	Class
S	4	Mike Arenson	Sr
S	18	Russell Williams	Sr
DB	28	Neddy Veron	Fr
DB	43	Darrius Smith	Sr
LB	44	Ryan Harry	So
LB	45	Dave Krajewski	Sr
LB	56	Frank Edmond	Fr
DL	62	Dwight Sims	Jr
DL	66	Doug Robertson	Jr
LB	88	Josh Arneson	Jr
NG	97	Joe Holland	Jr

Special teams

Pos.	#	Name	Class
PK/P	10	Kevin Reed	Fr

Head coach

- Mike McGlinchey

Coordinators/assistant coaches

- Paul Barnes
  (Offensive coordinator & offensive line coach)
- Rubin Stevenson
  (Defensive coordinator & special teams coordinator)

Legend

- (C) Team captain
- (S) Suspended
- (I) Ineligible
- Injured
- Redshirt
