= 1987 Buffalo Bulls football team =

American college football season

1987 Buffalo Bulls football
- Conference: Independent
- Record: 3–7
- Head coach: Bill Dando (11th season)
- Captains: Doug Majeski; Mike Marcolini; Marc Panepinto
- Home stadium: Rotary Field

1987 NCAA Division III independents football records
	Conf.			Overall
Team	W	L	T	W		L		T
Wagner ^		–		13	–	1	–	0
Samford		–		9	–	1	–	0
Rochester (NY) ^		–		9	–	2	–	0
Hofstra ^		–		8	–	2	–	0
UC Santa Barbara		–		8	–	2	–	0
Wabash		–		8	–	2	–	0
Dayton ^		–		11	–	3	–	0
Ferrum ^		–		8	–	2	–	1
Salisbury State		–		7	–	2	–	0
Georgetown		–		6	–	2	–	1
DePauw		–		7	–	3	–	0
Menlo ^		–		7	–	3	–	0
Millsaps		–		7	–	3	–	0
Canisius		–		6	–	3	–	1
San Diego		–		6	–	3	–	1
Mercyhurst		–		6	–	4	–	0
Cortland		–		5	–	4	–	0
Fairleigh Dickinson–Florham		–		5	–	4	–	0
Albany		–		5	–	5	–	0
Drake		–		5	–	5	–	0
Norwich		–		4	–	4	–	1
Union (NY)		–		5	–	5	–	0
Aurora		–		4	–	5	–	0
Stony Brook		–		4	–	5	–	0
Brockport		–		3	–	6	–	0
Buffalo		–		3	–	7	–	0
Catholic University		–		3	–	7	–	0
Saint Francis (PA)		–		2	–	6	–	0
Brooklyn		–		2	–	7	–	0
Colorado College		–		2	–	7	–	0
Duquesne		–		2	–	7	–	0
Frostburg State		–		2	–	8	–	0
Saint Peter's		–		2	–	8	–	0
Marist		–		1	–	7	–	0
Quincy		–		1	–	7	–	0
Western Connecticut State		–		1	–	8	–	1
Buffalo State		–		1	–	9	–	0
Wesley		–		0	–	9	–	0
^ – NCAA Division III playoff participant

The 1987 Buffalo Bulls football team represented the University at Buffalo as an independent during the 1987 NCAA Division III football season. Led by Bill Dando in his 11th season as head coach, the team compiled a record of 3–7.

== Schedule ==
Date	Opponent	Site	Result
September 5	at Findlay	Findlay, OH	L 13–39
September 19	at Buffalo State	Coyer Field; Buffalo, NY	W 41–6
September 26	at Central Connecticut State	Arute Field; New Britain, CT	L 0–22
October 3	Wagner	Rotary Field; Buffalo, NY	L 0–20
October 10	Canisius	Rotary Field; Buffalo, NY	L 14–20
October 17	at Ithaca	Ithaca, NY	L 0–29
October 24	at Brockport	Brockport, NY	W 28–7
October 31	Alfred	Rotary Field; Buffalo, NY	W 21–20
November 7	Albany	Rotary Field; Buffalo, NY	L 21–22
November 14	at Frostburg State	Bobcat Stadium; Frostburg, MD	L 13–19
