= 1987 UC Santa Barbara Gauchos football team =

American college football season

1987 UC Santa Barbara Gauchos football
- Conference: Independent
- Record: 8–2
- Head coach: Mike Warren (2nd season)
- Home stadium: Harder Stadium

1987 NCAA Division III independents football records
	Conf.			Overall
Team	W	L	T	W		L		T
Wagner ^		–		13	–	1	–	0
Samford		–		9	–	1	–	0
Rochester (NY) ^		–		9	–	2	–	0
Hofstra ^		–		8	–	2	–	0
UC Santa Barbara		–		8	–	2	–	0
Wabash		–		8	–	2	–	0
Dayton ^		–		11	–	3	–	0
Ferrum ^		–		8	–	2	–	1
Salisbury State		–		7	–	2	–	0
Georgetown		–		6	–	2	–	1
DePauw		–		7	–	3	–	0
Menlo ^		–		7	–	3	–	0
Millsaps		–		7	–	3	–	0
Canisius		–		6	–	3	–	1
San Diego		–		6	–	3	–	1
Mercyhurst		–		6	–	4	–	0
Cortland		–		5	–	4	–	0
Fairleigh Dickinson–Florham		–		5	–	4	–	0
Albany		–		5	–	5	–	0
Drake		–		5	–	5	–	0
Norwich		–		4	–	4	–	1
Union (NY)		–		5	–	5	–	0
Aurora		–		4	–	5	–	0
Stony Brook		–		4	–	5	–	0
Brockport		–		3	–	6	–	0
Buffalo		–		3	–	7	–	0
Catholic University		–		3	–	7	–	0
Saint Francis (PA)		–		2	–	6	–	0
Brooklyn		–		2	–	7	–	0
Colorado College		–		2	–	7	–	0
Duquesne		–		2	–	7	–	0
Frostburg State		–		2	–	8	–	0
Saint Peter's		–		2	–	8	–	0
Marist		–		1	–	7	–	0
Quincy		–		1	–	7	–	0
Western Connecticut State		–		1	–	8	–	1
Buffalo State		–		1	–	9	–	0
Wesley		–		0	–	9	–	0
^ – NCAA Division III playoff participant

The 1987 UC Santa Barbara Gauchos football team represented the University of California, Santa Barbara (UCSB) as an independent during the 1987 NCAA Division III football season. Led by second-year head coach Mike Warren, the Gauchos compiled a record of 8–2 and outscored their opponents 237 to 107 for the season. The team played home games at Harder Stadium in Santa Barbara, California.

== Schedule ==
Date	Opponent	Site	Result	Attendance	Source
September 12	Azusa Pacific	Campus Stadium; Santa Barbara, CA	W 34–7	1,772–2,772	
September 19	at Claremont-Mudd	Fritz B. Burns Stadium; Claremont, CA	W 17–13	500–1,200	
September 26	at Whittier	Memorial Stadium; Whittier, CA	L 7–14	1,200	
October 3	Redlands	Campus Stadium; Santa Barbara, CA	W 35–14	2,506	
October 10	Saint Mary's	Saint Mary's Stadium; Moraga, CA	W 16–13	3,125–3,215	
October 17	La Verne^{†}	Campus Stadium; Santa Barbara, CA	W 35–12	1,436	
October 24	at Pomona-Pitzer	Alumni Field (Note: Merritt Field was known as Alumni Field until 1991.); Claremont, CA	W 55–0	1,000	
October 31	San Diego	Campus Stadium; Santa Barbara, CA	L 0–7	1,031	
November 7	Cal Lutheran	Campus Stadium; Santa Barbara, CA	W 16–15	8,748	
November 14	at Sonoma State	Cossacks Stadium (Note: Seawolf Stadium was known as Cossacks Stadium until 2002 when the University changed the mascot from Cossacks to Seawolves.); Rohnert Park, CA	W 22–12	572	
^{†}Homecoming
