= 1987 Wagner Seahawks football team =

American college football season

1987 Wagner Seahawks football

NCAA Division III champion

Stagg Bowl, W 19–3 vs. Dayton
- Conference: Independent
- Record: 13–1
- Head coach: Walt Hameline (7th season)
- Home stadium: Wagner College Stadium

1987 NCAA Division III independents football records
	Conf.			Overall
Team	W	L	T	W		L		T
Wagner ^		–		13	–	1	–	0
Samford		–		9	–	1	–	0
Rochester (NY) ^		–		9	–	2	–	0
Hofstra ^		–		8	–	2	–	0
UC Santa Barbara		–		8	–	2	–	0
Wabash		–		8	–	2	–	0
Dayton ^		–		11	–	3	–	0
Ferrum ^		–		8	–	2	–	1
Salisbury State		–		7	–	2	–	0
Georgetown		–		6	–	2	–	1
DePauw		–		7	–	3	–	0
Menlo ^		–		7	–	3	–	0
Millsaps		–		7	–	3	–	0
Canisius		–		6	–	3	–	1
San Diego		–		6	–	3	–	1
Mercyhurst		–		6	–	4	–	0
Cortland		–		5	–	4	–	0
Fairleigh Dickinson–Florham		–		5	–	4	–	0
Albany		–		5	–	5	–	0
Drake		–		5	–	5	–	0
Norwich		–		4	–	4	–	1
Union (NY)		–		5	–	5	–	0
Aurora		–		4	–	5	–	0
Stony Brook		–		4	–	5	–	0
Brockport		–		3	–	6	–	0
Buffalo		–		3	–	7	–	0
Catholic University		–		3	–	7	–	0
Saint Francis (PA)		–		2	–	6	–	0
Brooklyn		–		2	–	7	–	0
Colorado College		–		2	–	7	–	0
Duquesne		–		2	–	7	–	0
Frostburg State		–		2	–	8	–	0
Saint Peter's		–		2	–	8	–	0
Marist		–		1	–	7	–	0
Quincy		–		1	–	7	–	0
Western Connecticut State		–		1	–	8	–	1
Buffalo State		–		1	–	9	–	0
Wesley		–		0	–	9	–	0
^ – NCAA Division III playoff participant

The 1987 Wagner Seahawks football team was an American football team that represented Wagner College as an independent during the 1987 NCAA Division III football season. In their seventh season under head coach Walt Hameline, the Seahawks compiled a 13–1 record, outscored opponents by a total of 403 to 164, and won the NCAA Division III championship. The team participated in the NCAA Division III playoffs where they defeated Rochester (NY) in the first round, Fordham in the Eastern Finals, Emory and Henry in the semifinal, and Dayton in the Stagg Bowl.

The team was led on offense by quarterback Greg Kovar and tailback Terry Underwood.

The team played its home games at Wagner College Stadium on Staten Island.

== Schedule ==
Date	Opponent	Site	Result	Attendance	Source
September 5	William Paterson	Wagner College Stadium; Staten Island, NY	W 14–0	2,500	
September 12	at Montclair State	Upper Montclair, NJ	W 24–17	4,285	
September 19	at St. John's	Jamaica, NY	W 30–14	1,459	
September 26	Trenton State	Wagner College Stadium; Staten Island, NY	W 41–13	2,700	
October 3	at Buffalo	Buffalo, NY	W 20–0	1,796	
October 10	at Hofstra	Hempstead, NY	L 28–35	6,895	
October 24	at Merchant Marine	Kings Point, NY	W 16–14	1,841	
October 31	C. W. Post	Wagner College Stadium; Staten Island, NY	W 46–29	5,000	
November 7	at Western Connecticut State	Danbury, CT	W 27–3	1,200	
November 14	Pace	Wagner College Stadium; Staten Island, NY	W 59–7	3,500	
November 21	Rochester (NY)	Wagner College Stadium; Staten Island, NY (NCAA Division III first round)	W 38–14		
November 28	at Fordham	Jack Coffey Field; Bronx, NY (NCAA Division III quarterfinal)	W 21–0		
December 5	at Emory and Henry	Abingdon, VA (NCAA Division III semifinal)	W 20–15		
December 12	vs. Dayton	Garrett-Harrison Stadium; Phenix City, AL (Stagg Bowl—NCAA Division III championship game)	W 19–3	4,000	
