= Jerry Boyes =

American football player, coach, and college athletics administrator

Playing career
- 1972–1975: Ithaca
- Position: Quarterback

Coaching career (HC unless noted)
- 1977–1985: Ithaca (OC)
- 1986–2000: Buffalo State
- 2009–2018: Buffalo State

Administrative career (AD unless noted)
- 1999–2020: Buffalo State

Head coaching record
- Overall: 138–116
- Bowls: 3–1
- Tournaments: 2–7 (NCAA D-III playoffs)

Accomplishments and honors

Awards
- CNN Division III Coach of the Year (1995); 3× ECAC Upstate Coach of the Year

Jerry Boyes is an American former college football coach and athletics administrator. Boyes was the head coach of the Buffalo State Bengals football program from 1986 to 2000 and again from 2009 to 2018, compiling a record of 138–116. He later served as the athletic director at Buffalo State from 1999 to 2020.

== Head coaching record ==
Year	Team	Overall	Conference	Standing	Bowl/playoffs
Buffalo State Bengals (NCAA Division III independent) (1986–2000)
1986	Buffalo State	1–8			
1987	Buffalo State	1–9			
1988	Buffalo State	1–7			
1989	Buffalo State	1–8			
1990	Buffalo State	7–2			
1991	Buffalo State	9–2			W ECAC Northeast Championship
1992	Buffalo State	7–3			L NCAA Division III Quarterfinal
1993	Buffalo State	6–4			L NCAA Division III First Round
1994	Buffalo State	6–4			L NCAA Division III First Round
1995	Buffalo State	9–2			L NCAA Division III First Round
1996	Buffalo State	8–2			L NCAA Division III First Round
1997	Buffalo State	8–2			W ECAC III NW Playoff
1998	Buffalo State	9–3			L NCAA Division III Quarterfinal
1999	Buffalo State	7–3			L NCAA Division III First Round
2000	Buffalo State	7–4			
Buffalo State Bengals (New Jersey Athletic Conference) (2009–2011)
2009	Buffalo State	2–8	2–7	T–8th	
2010	Buffalo State	4–6	4–5	6th	
2011	Buffalo State	5–5	5–4	T–5th	
Buffalo State Bengals (Empire 8) (2012–2018)
2012	Buffalo State	6–4	4–3	T–3rd	
2013	Buffalo State	5–5	3–4	T–5th	
2014	Buffalo State	8–3	5–3	T–3rd	W ECAC Southwest Bowl
2015	Buffalo State	7–4	5–3	T–3rd	L ECAC Bushnell Bowl
2016	Buffalo State	5–5	3–5	T–6th	
2017	Buffalo State	6–5	3–4	4th	L ECAC Chapman Bowl
2018	Buffalo State	1–9	1–6	7th	
Buffalo State:		138–116	35–44		
Total:		138–116			
