= Chip Knapp =

American football player and coach

Biographical details
- Born: 1964 or 1965 (age 61–62)

Playing career
- c. 1985–1986: Cornell

Coaching career (HC unless noted)
- 1987: Cornell (freshmen QB)
- 1987–1988: Kansas (offensive asst.)
- 1989–1990: Wesley (DE) (defensive asst.)
- 1991–2017: Wesley (DE) (OC)
- 2018–2020: Wesley (DE)
- 2021–2023: Dover HS (DE)

Head coaching record
- Overall: 19–7 (college); 25–12 (high school)
- Bowls: 1–0
- Tournaments: 1–1 (NCAA D-III playoffs)

Chip Knapp (born 1964/1965) is an American football coach and former player. He coached for 30 seasons at Wesley College, the final three as head football coach before the program was shut down. He played quarterback in college for Cornell.

== Playing career ==
Knapp played college football for Cornell under head coach Maxie Baughan from c. 1985–1986. He earned the starting quarterback position as a junior in 1985, but was sidelined for part of the season due to a knee injury. He played in six games the following year, but the "fine play of Marty Stallone" kept him off the field for most of the time.

== Coaching career ==
After graduating in 1987 with a bachelor's degree in economics, Knapp was hired by Cornell as the freshmen quarterbacks coach. He left before the season started to join the Kansas Jayhawks as an offensive assistant. He spent the 1987 and 1988 seasons there. He left after a promised stipend from Kansas was not given to him. Taking advice from friend Roy O'Neil, Knapp joined Wesley College in Dover, Delaware, as a defensive assistant. Though he only expected to remain with the program for a year or two, Knapp would eventually spend 30 seasons at Wesley. He was promoted to offensive coordinator in his third year, a position he would retain until 2018.

When longtime head coach Mike Drass died in 2018, Knapp was promoted to head coach. Wesley compiled a 7–4 record in his first year as head coach. They improved the following year, making the second round of the NCAA Division III playoffs with a 10–2 record. The 2020 season was cancelled, but a spring schedule was later released. His team went 2–1 in the spring schedule. The program was discontinued in 2021, following Knapp's third season. As an assistant coach and head coach, he helped players to 48 All-American honors, 99 All-Region honors and 122 All-Conference awards.

He accepted a position as head coach of Dover High School in May 2021. He resigned after three seasons in 2023.

== Head coaching record ==
=== College ===
Year	Team	Overall	Conference	Standing	Bowl/playoffs	D3^{#}
Wesley Wolverines (New Jersey Athletic Conference) (2018–2020)
2018	Wesley	7–4	5–4	5th	W Clayton Chapman	
2019	Wesley	10–2	6–1	2nd	L NCAA Division III Second Round	11
2020–21	Wesley	2–1	2–1	2nd		
Wesley:		19–7	13–6			
Total:		19–7				

=== High school ===
Year	Team	Overall	Conference	Standing	Bowl/playoffs
Dover Senators () (2021–2023)
2021	Dover	7–5	3–1	2nd	
2022	Dover	9–5	1–2	3rd	
2023	Dover	9–2	4–1	2nd	
Dover:		25–12	8–4		
Total:		25–12			
