= Mike McGlinchey (American football coach) =

American athlete and football coach (1944–1997)

Biographical details
- Born: December 28, 1944; Richland, Washington, U.S.
- Died: March 24, 1997 (aged 52); Salisbury, Maryland, U.S.

Playing career

Football
- c. 1965: Delaware

Baseball
- c. 1965: Delaware

Wrestling
- c. 1965: Delaware
- Position: Defensive back (football)

Coaching career (HC unless noted)

Football
- 1972–1981: Salisbury State (assistant)
- 1982–1986: Salisbury State
- 1987–1991: Central Connecticut
- 1992–1995: Frostburg State

Head coaching record
- Overall: 91–49–6
- Tournaments: 6–4 (NCAA D-III playoffs)

Michael A. McGlinchey (December 28, 1944 – March 24, 1997) was an American college football coach. He served as the head football coach at Salisbury State University—now known as Salisbury University—from 1982 to 1986, Central Connecticut State University from 1987 to 1991, and Frostburg State University from 1992 to 1995, compiling a career head coaching record of 91–49–6.

McGlinchey was born in Richland, Washington and attended Newark High School in Newark, Delaware. At the University of Delaware, he competed in football, baseball, and wrestling. McGlinchey died of amyotrophic lateral sclerosis, at his home in Salisbury, Maryland, on March 24, 1997.

== Coaching career ==
McGlinchey was the ninth head football coach at Frostburg State University in Frostburg, Maryland and he held that position for four seasons, from 1992 until 1995. His coaching record at Frostburg was 30–11–2.

== Honors ==
He was inducted into the Delaware Sports Hall of Fame in 2009.

== Head coaching record ==
Year	Team	Overall	Conference	Standing	Bowl/playoffs
Salisbury State Sea Gulls (NCAA Division III independent) (1982–1986)
1982	Salisbury State	5–4			
1983	Salisbury State	10–1–1			L NCAA Division III Semifinal
1984	Salisbury State	6–3			
1985	Salisbury State	10–2			L NCAA Division III Quarterfinal
1986	Salisbury State	13–1			L NCAA Division III Championship
Salisbury State:		44–11–1			
Central Connecticut Blue Devils (NCAA Division II independent) (1987–1991)
1987	Central Connecticut	4–4–1			
1988	Central Connecticut	5–3–1			
1989	Central Connecticut	5–5			
1990	Central Connecticut	2–7			
1991	Central Connecticut	1–8–1			
Central Connecticut:		17–23–3			
Frostburg State Bobcats (NCAA Division III independent) (1992–1995)
1992	Frostburg State	6–3–1			
1993	Frostburg State	10–2			L NCAA Division III Quarterfinal
1994	Frostburg State	8–2–1			
1995	Frostburg State	6–4			
Frostburg State:		30–11–2			
Total:		91–49–6			
