= Paul Shaffner =

American football player and coach (born 1960)

Current position
- Title: Linebackers coach
- Team: Cortland
- Conference: Empire 8

Biographical details
- Born: September 3, 1960 (age 66)

Playing career
- 1979–1981: Ithaca
- Position: Center

Coaching career (HC unless noted)
- 1983–1985: Maine Maritime (DC)
- 1986–1987: Penn State (GA)
- 1988–1999: Lafayette (DC)
- 2000–2003: Glenville State
- 2004–2008: Buffalo State
- 2011–2012: Iroquois HS (NY) (DC)
- 2013–2021: Colgate (DC/ILB)
- 2022–2024: Cortland (DL)
- 2025–present: Cortland (LB)

Head coaching record
- Overall: 31–60

Accomplishments and honors

Championships
- 1 WVIAC (2001)

Awards
- WVIAC Coach of the Year (2001)

Paul Shaffner (born September 3, 1960) is an American football coach and former player. He is the linebackers coach Cortland University. Shaffner served as the head football coach at Glenville State College from 2000 to 2003 and at Buffalo State College from 2004 to 2008. He also coached for Colgate.

== Head coaching record ==
Year	Team	Overall	Conference	Standing	Bowl/playoffs
Glenville State Pioneers (West Virginia Intercollegiate Athletic Conference) (2000–2003)
2000	Glenville State	3–8	2–5	T–6th	
2001	Glenville State	6–3	6–1	1st	
2002	Glenville State	4–7	3–4	5th	
2003	Glenville State	5–6	4–3	T–2nd	
Glenville State:		18–24	15–13		
Buffalo State Bengals (Atlantic Central Football Conference) (2004–2005)
2004	Buffalo State	4–6	2–3	4th	
2005	Buffalo State	3–6	1–4	T–4th	
Buffalo State Bengals (New Jersey Athletic Conference) (2006–2008)
2006	Buffalo State	3–7	2–5	T–5th	
2007	Buffalo State	2–8	1–6	8th	
2008	Buffalo State	1–9	1–8	9th	
Buffalo State:		13–36	7–26		
Total:		31–60			
National championship Conference title Conference division title or championship game berth
