= 1987 NCAA Division III football season =

American college football season

- Regular season: August – November 1987
- Playoffs: November – December 1987
- National championship: Garrett-Harrison Stadium; Phenix City, AL
- Champion: Wagner

The 1987 NCAA Division III football season, part of the college football season organized by the NCAA at the Division III level in the United States, began in August 1987, and concluded with the NCAA Division III Football Championship, also known as the Stagg Bowl, in December 1987 at Garrett-Harrison Stadium in Phenix City, Alabama.

Wagner won their first Division III championship by defeating Dayton in the championship game, 19−3. Due to NCAA rule changes in 1991, both schools are now members Football Championship Subdivision (formerly I-AA).

== Conference changes and new programs ==
- This was the final season that the Southern Intercollegiate Athletic Conference sponsored Division III football. Beginning in 1988, their three remaining Division III members (Miles, Lane, and Knoxville) were classified Division II along with the rest of the SIAC.
- Quincy College, which had played an abbreviated schedule featuring mainly junior varsity teams in 1986, played a full schedule for the first time since 1953.

| School | 1986 Conference | 1987 Conference |
|---|---|---|
| Bishop | D-III Independent | Dropped program |
| Chicago | Midwest | D-III Independent |
| Kentucky Wesleyan | D-III Independent | Mid-South (NAIA) |
| Lowell | D-III Independent | NEFC |
| Maritime | Revived Program | D-III Independent |
| St. John Fisher | Club program | D-III Independent |
| Quincy | Revived Program | D-III Independent |

== Conference standings ==
1987 College Conference of Illinois and Wisconsin football standings
| | Conf. | | | | | Overall |
| Team | W | | L | | T | W | | L | | T |
|---|---|---|---|---|---|---|---|---|---|---|
| Augustana (IL) $^ | 8 | – | 0 | – | 0 | 10 | – | 1 | – | 0 |
| Millikin | 6 | – | 2 | – | 0 | 6 | – | 3 | – | 0 |
| North Central (IL) | 5 | – | 3 | – | 0 | 6 | – | 3 | – | 0 |
| Carroll (WI) | 5 | – | 3 | – | 0 | 5 | – | 4 | – | 0 |
| Elmhurst | 4 | – | 4 | – | 0 | 5 | – | 4 | – | 0 |
| Illinois Wesleyan | 4 | – | 4 | – | 0 | 4 | – | 5 | – | 0 |
| Wheaton (IL) | 2 | – | 6 | – | 0 | 3 | – | 6 | – | 0 |
| Carthage | 2 | – | 6 | – | 0 | 2 | – | 7 | – | 0 |
| North Park | 0 | – | 8 | – | 0 | 0 | – | 9 | – | 0 |
$ – Conference champion; ^ – NCAA Division III playoff participant

1987 Centennial Conference football standings
| | Conf. | | | | | Overall |
| Team | W | | L | | T | W | | L | | T |
|---|---|---|---|---|---|---|---|---|---|---|
| Franklin & Marshall $ | 7 | – | 0 | – | 0 | 9 | – | 1 | – | 1 |
| Dickinson | 5 | – | 2 | – | 0 | 7 | – | 3 | – | 0 |
| Muhlenberg | 5 | – | 2 | – | 0 | 7 | – | 3 | – | 0 |
| Gettysburg | 4 | – | 3 | – | 0 | 7 | – | 3 | – | 0 |
| Johns Hopkins | 3 | – | 4 | – | 0 | 4 | – | 6 | – | 0 |
| Ursinus | 2 | – | 5 | – | 0 | 3 | – | 6 | – | 0 |
| Swarthmore | 1 | – | 6 | – | 0 | 2 | – | 8 | – | 0 |
| Western Maryland | 1 | – | 6 | – | 0 | 1 | – | 8 | – | 1 |
$ – Conference champion

1987 College Athletic Conference football standings
| | Conf. | | | | | Overall |
| Team | W | | L | | T | W | | L | | T |
|---|---|---|---|---|---|---|---|---|---|---|
| Rhodes $ | 4 | – | 0 | – | 0 | 7 | – | 1 | – | 2 |
| Rose–Hulman | 3 | – | 1 | – | 0 | 9 | – | 1 | – | 0 |
| Sewanee | 1 | – | 3 | – | 0 | 5 | – | 4 | – | 0 |
| Centre | 1 | – | 3 | – | 0 | 4 | – | 5 | – | 0 |
| Earlham | 1 | – | 3 | – | 0 | 3 | – | 6 | – | 0 |
$ – Conference champion

1987 Independent College Athletic Conference football standings
| | Conf. | | | | | Overall |
| Team | W | | L | | T | W | | L | | T |
|---|---|---|---|---|---|---|---|---|---|---|
| Ithaca $ | 3 | – | 0 | – | 0 | 7 | – | 3 | – | 0 |
| Alfred | 2 | – | 1 | – | 0 | 6 | – | 3 | – | 1 |
| St. Lawrence | 2 | – | 2 | – | 0 | 5 | – | 4 | – | 0 |
| RPI | 1 | – | 1 | – | 0 | 5 | – | 5 | – | 0 |
| Hobart | 0 | – | 4 | – | 0 | 2 | – | 8 | – | 0 |
$ – Conference champion

1987 Iowa Conference football standings
| | Conf. | | | | | Overall |
| Team | W | | L | | T | W | | L | | T |
|---|---|---|---|---|---|---|---|---|---|---|
| Central (IA) $^ | 7 | – | 1 | – | 0 | 11 | – | 2 | – | 0 |
| Luther | 6 | – | 2 | – | 0 | 8 | – | 2 | – | 0 |
| Buena Vista | 5 | – | 3 | – | 0 | 5 | – | 5 | – | 0 |
| Wartburg | 4 | – | 4 | – | 0 | 6 | – | 4 | – | 0 |
| Dubuque | 4 | – | 4 | – | 0 | 6 | – | 5 | – | 0 |
| William Penn | 3 | – | 5 | – | 0 | 4 | – | 6 | – | 0 |
| Loras | 3 | – | 5 | – | 0 | 4 | – | 7 | – | 0 |
| Simpson (IA) | 3 | – | 5 | – | 0 | 3 | – | 6 | – | 0 |
| Upper Iowa | 1 | – | 7 | – | 0 | 1 | – | 9 | – | 0 |
$ – Conference champion; ^ – NCAA Division III playoff participant

1987 Liberty Football Conference standings
| | Conf. | | | | | Overall |
| Team | W | | L | | T | W | | L | | T |
|---|---|---|---|---|---|---|---|---|---|---|
| Fordham $ | 5 | – | 0 | – | 0 | 9 | – | 1 | – | 0 |
| Merchant Marine | 3 | – | 2 | – | 0 | 4 | – | 5 | – | 0 |
| Iona | 2 | – | 3 | – | 0 | 5 | – | 4 | – | 0 |
| St. John's | 2 | – | 3 | – | 0 | 5 | – | 5 | – | 0 |
| C. W. Post | 2 | – | 3 | – | 0 | 2 | – | 8 | – | 0 |
| Pace | 1 | – | 4 | – | 0 | 3 | – | 6 | – | 0 |
$ – Conference champion

1987 Michigan Intercollegiate Athletic Association football standings
| | Conf. | | | | | Overall |
| Team | W | | L | | T | W | | L | | T |
|---|---|---|---|---|---|---|---|---|---|---|
| Hope $ | 5 | – | 0 | – | 0 | 6 | – | 3 | – | 0 |
| Adrian | 4 | – | 1 | – | 0 | 7 | – | 2 | – | 0 |
| Albion | 3 | – | 2 | – | 0 | 5 | – | 4 | – | 0 |
| Alma | 2 | – | 3 | – | 0 | 5 | – | 4 | – | 0 |
| Olivet | 1 | – | 4 | – | 0 | 2 | – | 6 | – | 1 |
| Kalamazoo | 0 | – | 5 | – | 0 | 1 | – | 8 | – | 0 |
$ – Conference champion

1987 Middle Atlantic Conference football standings
| | Conf. | | | | | Overall |
| Team | W | | L | | T | W | | L | | T |
|---|---|---|---|---|---|---|---|---|---|---|
| Susquehanna + | 7 | – | 2 | – | 0 | 8 | – | 2 | – | 0 |
| Widener + | 7 | – | 2 | – | 0 | 8 | – | 2 | – | 0 |
| Lycoming | 6 | – | 2 | – | 1 | 6 | – | 2 | – | 1 |
| Juniata | 6 | – | 3 | – | 0 | 7 | – | 3 | – | 0 |
| Moravian | 6 | – | 3 | – | 0 | 6 | – | 4 | – | 0 |
| Wilkes | 6 | – | 3 | – | 0 | 7 | – | 3 | – | 0 |
| Delaware Valley | 3 | – | 5 | – | 1 | 3 | – | 6 | – | 1 |
| Albright | 1 | – | 8 | – | 0 | 2 | – | 8 | – | 0 |
| Lebanon Valley | 1 | – | 8 | – | 0 | 2 | – | 8 | – | 0 |
| Upsala | 1 | – | 8 | – | 0 | 1 | – | 9 | – | 0 |
+ – Conference co-champions

1987 Midwest Conference football standings
| | Conf. | | | Overall |
| Team | W | | L | W | | L |
|---|---|---|---|---|---|---|
North Division
| St. Norbert* xy$ | 6 | – | 1 | 7 | – | 3 |
| Lawrence* | 5 | – | 2 | 6 | – | 3 |
| Ripon* | 2 | – | 5 | 3 | – | 6 |
| Lake Forest* | 2 | – | 5 | 2 | – | 6 |
| Beloit* | 0 | – | 7 | 1 | – | 8 |
South Division
| Monmouth (IL)* xy | 7 | – | 0 | 9 | – | 1 |
| Coe | 5 | – | 2 | 6 | – | 3 |
| Knox | 5 | – | 2 | 6 | – | 3 |
| Cornell (IA) | 4 | – | 3 | 5 | – | 4 |
| Grinnell | 1 | – | 6 | 1 | – | 7 |
| Illinois College* | 0 | – | 7 | 1 | – | 8 |
Championship: St. Norbert 20, Monmouth (IL) 15
$ – Conference champion; x – Division champion/co-champions; y – Championship game participant; * - While the University of Chicago was officially classified as an independent, the seven games they played against Midwest Conference opponents still counted for the conference standings.

1987 Minnesota Intercollegiate Athletic Conference football standings
| | Conf. | | | | | Overall |
| Team | W | | L | | T | W | | L | | T |
|---|---|---|---|---|---|---|---|---|---|---|
| Gustavus Adolphus $^ | 9 | – | 0 | – | 0 | 10 | – | 1 | – | 0 |
| Saint John's (MN) ^ | 7 | – | 2 | – | 0 | 8 | – | 3 | – | 0 |
| Concordia–Moorhead | 7 | – | 2 | – | 0 | 7 | – | 3 | – | 0 |
| Carleton | 5 | – | 4 | – | 0 | 6 | – | 4 | – | 0 |
| Hamline | 5 | – | 4 | – | 0 | 6 | – | 4 | – | 0 |
| St. Thomas (MN) | 5 | – | 4 | – | 0 | 5 | – | 5 | – | 0 |
| Macalester | 3 | – | 6 | – | 0 | 4 | – | 6 | – | 0 |
| St. Olaf | 3 | – | 6 | – | 0 | 3 | – | 7 | – | 0 |
| Augsburg | 0 | – | 8 | – | 1 | 0 | – | 9 | – | 1 |
| Bethel (MN) | 0 | – | 8 | – | 1 | 0 | – | 9 | – | 1 |
$ – Conference champion; ^ – NCAA Division III playoff participant

1987 New England Football Conference standings
| | Conf. | | | | | Overall |
| Team | W | | L | | T | W | | L | | T |
|---|---|---|---|---|---|---|---|---|---|---|
North Division
| Plymouth State xy$ | 5 | – | 0 | – | 0 | 10 | – | 1 | – | 0 |
| Curry | 3 | – | 1 | – | 0 | 7 | – | 1 | – | 0 |
| Nichols | 3 | – | 2 | – | 0 | 5 | – | 4 | – | 0 |
| Lowell | 2 | – | 2 | – | 0 | 4 | – | 4 | – | 0 |
| Western New England | 1 | – | 4 | – | 0 | 2 | – | 6 | – | 0 |
| Maine Maritime | 0 | – | 5 | – | 0 | 0 | – | 8 | – | 0 |
South Division
| Worcester State xy | 5 | – | 0 | – | 0 | 7 | – | 2 | – | 0 |
| Westfield State | 3 | – | 2 | – | 0 | 6 | – | 3 | – | 0 |
| Massachusetts Maritime | 3 | – | 2 | – | 0 | 4 | – | 4 | – | 0 |
| Bridgewater State | 3 | – | 2 | – | 0 | 4 | – | 5 | – | 0 |
| Framingham State | 1 | – | 4 | – | 0 | 2 | – | 6 | – | 0 |
| Fitchburg State | 0 | – | 5 | – | 0 | 0 | – | 8 | – | 0 |
Championship: Plymouth State 40, Worcester State 0
$ – Conference champion; x – Division champion/co-champions; y – Championship game participant

1987 New England Small College Athletic Conference football standings
| | Conf. | | | | | Overall |
| Team | W | | L | | T | W | | L | | T |
|---|---|---|---|---|---|---|---|---|---|---|
| Trinity (CT) | 6 | – | 1 | – | 0 | 6 | – | 2 | – | 0 |
| Hamilton | 5 | – | 1 | – | 0 | 6 | – | 2 | – | 0 |
| Amherst | 6 | – | 2 | – | 0 | 6 | – | 2 | – | 0 |
| Middlebury | 4 | – | 2 | – | 0 | 4 | – | 4 | – | 0 |
| Bowdoin | 4 | – | 3 | – | 0 | 5 | – | 3 | – | 0 |
| Williams | 4 | – | 3 | – | 0 | 4 | – | 4 | – | 0 |
| Tufts | 3 | – | 4 | – | 0 | 4 | – | 4 | – | 0 |
| Bates | 1 | – | 6 | – | 0 | 2 | – | 6 | – | 0 |
| Wesleyan | 1 | – | 6 | – | 0 | 1 | – | 7 | – | 0 |
| Colby | 0 | – | 6 | – | 0 | 0 | – | 8 | – | 0 |
The NESCAC did not recognize an official conference champion until 2000

1987 New Jersey Athletic Conference football standings
| | Conf. | | | | | Overall |
| Team | W | | L | | T | W | | L | | T |
|---|---|---|---|---|---|---|---|---|---|---|
| Kean $ | 5 | – | 1 | – | 0 | 9 | – | 2 | – | 0 |
| Montclair State | 5 | – | 1 | – | 0 | 8 | – | 2 | – | 0 |
| Glassboro State | 4 | – | 2 | – | 0 | 6 | – | 4 | – | 0 |
| William Paterson | 4 | – | 2 | – | 0 | 7 | – | 3 | – | 0 |
| Trenton State | 2 | – | 4 | – | 0 | 4 | – | 6 | – | 0 |
| Jersey City State | 1 | – | 5 | – | 0 | 4 | – | 6 | – | 0 |
| Ramapo | 0 | – | 6 | – | 0 | 1 | – | 9 | – | 0 |
$ – Conference champion

1987 North Coast Athletic Conference football standings
| | Conf. | | | | | Overall |
| Team | W | | L | | T | W | | L | | T |
|---|---|---|---|---|---|---|---|---|---|---|
| Allegheny $^ | 6 | – | 0 | – | 0 | 9 | – | 1 | – | 1 |
| Ohio Wesleyan | 4 | – | 2 | – | 0 | 5 | – | 5 | – | 0 |
| Wooster | 3 | – | 3 | – | 0 | 5 | – | 4 | – | 0 |
| Case Western Reserve | 3 | – | 3 | – | 0 | 5 | – | 4 | – | 0 |
| Denison | 2 | – | 4 | – | 0 | 5 | – | 5 | – | 0 |
| Oberlin | 2 | – | 4 | – | 0 | 2 | – | 8 | – | 0 |
| Kenyon | 1 | – | 5 | – | 0 | 2 | – | 8 | – | 0 |
$ – Conference champion; ^ – NCAA Division III playoff participant

1987 Ohio Athletic Conference football standings
| | Conf. | | | | | Overall |
| Team | W | | L | | T | W | | L | | T |
|---|---|---|---|---|---|---|---|---|---|---|
| Capital $^ | 6 | – | 1 | – | 1 | 7 | – | 2 | – | 2 |
| Baldwin–Wallace | 6 | – | 2 | – | 0 | 7 | – | 3 | – | 0 |
| Mount Union | 6 | – | 2 | – | 0 | 6 | – | 4 | – | 0 |
| Muskingum | 5 | – | 2 | – | 1 | 6 | – | 4 | – | 0 |
| Wittenberg | 5 | – | 3 | – | 0 | 6 | – | 4 | – | 0 |
| Ohio Northern | 3 | – | 5 | – | 0 | 4 | – | 6 | – | 0 |
| Marietta | 2 | – | 6 | – | 0 | 3 | – | 7 | – | 0 |
| Heidelberg | 1 | – | 7 | – | 0 | 2 | – | 8 | – | 0 |
| Otterbein | 1 | – | 7 | – | 0 | 2 | – | 8 | – | 0 |
$ – Conference champion; ^ – NCAA Division III playoff participant

1987 Old Dominion Athletic Conference football standings
| | Conf. | | | | | Overall |
| Team | W | | L | | T | W | | L | | T |
|---|---|---|---|---|---|---|---|---|---|---|
| Hampden–Sydney $ | 4 | – | 1 | – | 0 | 5 | – | 5 | – | 0 |
| Emory & Henry ^ | 4 | – | 1 | – | 0 | 11 | – | 3 | – | 0 |
| Randolph–Macon | 3 | – | 2 | – | 0 | 4 | – | 5 | – | 1 |
| Bridgewater | 1 | – | 4 | – | 0 | 4 | – | 6 | – | 0 |
| Washington and Lee | 1 | – | 4 | – | 0 | 3 | – | 6 | – | 0 |
| Maryville (TN) | 1 | – | 4 | – | 0 | 1 | – | 8 | – | 0 |
$ – Conference champion; ^ – NCAA Division III playoff participant; Hampden–Sydney won the conference title by virtue of a head-to-head win over Emory & Henry.

1987 Presidents' Athletic Conference football standings
| | Conf. | | | | | Overall |
| Team | W | | L | | T | W | | L | | T |
|---|---|---|---|---|---|---|---|---|---|---|
| Washington & Jefferson $^ | 6 | – | 0 | – | 0 | 10 | – | 1 | – | 0 |
| Hiram ^ | 5 | – | 1 | – | 0 | 8 | – | 2 | – | 0 |
| Carnegie Mellon | 4 | – | 2 | – | 0 | 7 | – | 2 | – | 1 |
| John Carroll | 3 | – | 3 | – | 0 | 5 | – | 4 | – | 0 |
| Grove City | 2 | – | 4 | – | 0 | 3 | – | 6 | – | 0 |
| Thiel | 1 | – | 5 | – | 0 | 2 | – | 6 | – | 0 |
| Bethany (WV) | 0 | – | 6 | – | 0 | 0 | – | 8 | – | 1 |
$ – Conference champion; ^ – NCAA Division III playoff participant

1987 Southern California Intercollegiate Athletic Conference football standings
| | Conf. | | | | | Overall |
| Team | W | | L | | T | W | | L | | T |
|---|---|---|---|---|---|---|---|---|---|---|
| Occidental + | 4 | – | 0 | – | 1 | 6 | – | 2 | – | 1 |
| Claremont-Mudd + | 4 | – | 0 | – | 1 | 5 | – | 4 | – | 0 |
| La Verne | 2 | – | 2 | – | 1 | 3 | – | 6 | – | 0 |
| Whittier | 1 | – | 3 | – | 1 | 4 | – | 6 | – | 0 |
| Pomona-Pitzer | 1 | – | 3 | – | 1 | 3 | – | 6 | – | 0 |
| Redlands | 0 | – | 4 | – | 1 | 1 | – | 8 | – | 0 |
+ – Conference co-champions; Each team played one other conference member twice. A head-to-head sweep of the two games counted as one win for the winner and one loss for the loser in the conference standings. A split of the two games counted as a tie for each team.

1987 Southern Intercollegiate Athletic Conference football standings
| | Conf. | | | | | Overall |
| Team | W | | L | | T | W | | L | | T |
|---|---|---|---|---|---|---|---|---|---|---|
Division II
| No. 20 Tuskegee x | 6 | – | 1 | – | 0 | 8 | – | 2 | – | 0 |
| No. 18 Alabama A&M* x | 6 | – | 1 | – | 0 | 8 | – | 3 | – | 0 |
| Albany State | 5 | – | 2 | – | 0 | 8 | – | 3 | – | 0 |
| Fort Valley State | 3 | – | 4 | – | 0 | 4 | – | 6 | – | 0 |
| Morehouse | 3 | – | 4 | – | 0 | 4 | – | 6 | – | 0 |
| Savannah State | 3 | – | 4 | – | 0 | 4 | – | 6 | – | 0 |
| Morris Brown | 2 | – | 5 | – | 0 | 2 | – | 8 | – | 1 |
| Clark | 0 | – | 7 | – | 0 | 1 | – | 8 | – | 0 |
Division III
| Knoxville x | 5 | – | 0 | – | 0 | 7 | – | 1 | – | 0 |
| Lane | 1 | – | 4 | – | 0 | 1 | – | 7 | – | 1 |
| Miles | 0 | – | 5 | – | 0 | 1 | – | 8 | – | 0 |
x – Division champion/co-champions; * – Alabama A&M's loss to North Alabama was designation as a conference game.; Rankings from 1987 NCAA Division II football rankings

1987 Wisconsin State University Conference football standings
| | Conf. | | | | | Overall |
| Team | W | | L | | T | W | | L | | T |
|---|---|---|---|---|---|---|---|---|---|---|
| Wisconsin–Whitewater + | 6 | – | 2 | – | 0 | 8 | – | 2 | – | 1 |
| No. 25 Wisconsin–River Falls + | 6 | – | 2 | – | 0 | 7 | – | 3 | – | 0 |
| No. 24 Wisconsin–Eau Claire | 5 | – | 3 | – | 0 | 6 | – | 4 | – | 0 |
| Wisconsin–La Crosse | 5 | – | 3 | – | 0 | 6 | – | 4 | – | 0 |
| Wisconsin–Stout | 5 | – | 3 | – | 0 | 6 | – | 5 | – | 0 |
| Wisconsin–Platteville | 4 | – | 4 | – | 0 | 6 | – | 5 | – | 0 |
| Wisconsin–Oshkosh | 3 | – | 5 | – | 0 | 6 | – | 5 | – | 0 |
| Wisconsin–Superior | 2 | – | 6 | – | 0 | 3 | – | 7 | – | 0 |
| No. 4 Wisconsin–Stevens Point ^ | 0 | – | 8 | – | 0 | 0 | – | 15 | – | 0 |
+ – Conference co-champions; ^ – NAIA Division II playoff participant Wisconsin–Stevens Point finished the season with an overall record of 12–2–1 and a conference mark of 7–1, winning the WSUC title and advancing to the NAIA Division II Football National Championship playoffs, where they tied Pacific Lutheran in the title game, sharing the NAIA Division II title. In May 1988, Stevens Point forfeited its 12 wins, the one tie, and the conference and NAIA titles because of the use of two ineligible players.; Rankings from NAIA Division II poll

1987 NCAA Division III independents football records
| | Conf. | | | Overall |
| Team | W | L | T | W | | L | | T |
|---|---|---|---|---|---|---|---|---|
| Wagner ^ | | – | | 13 | – | 1 | – | 0 |
| Samford | | – | | 9 | – | 1 | – | 0 |
| Gallaudet | | – | | 9 | – | 1 | – | 0 |
| Rochester (NY) ^ | | – | | 9 | – | 2 | – | 0 |
| Hofstra ^ | | – | | 8 | – | 2 | – | 0 |
| UC Santa Barbara | | – | | 8 | – | 2 | – | 0 |
| Wabash | | – | | 8 | – | 2 | – | 0 |
| Dayton ^ | | – | | 11 | – | 3 | – | 0 |
| Ferrum ^ | | – | | 8 | – | 2 | – | 1 |
| Salisbury State | | – | | 7 | – | 2 | – | 0 |
| Georgetown | | – | | 6 | – | 2 | – | 1 |
| DePauw | | – | | 7 | – | 3 | – | 0 |
| Menlo ^ | | – | | 7 | – | 3 | – | 0 |
| Millsaps | | – | | 7 | – | 3 | – | 0 |
| Canisius | | – | | 6 | – | 3 | – | 1 |
| San Diego | | – | | 6 | – | 3 | – | 1 |
| Mercyhurst | | – | | 6 | – | 4 | – | 0 |
| Chicago | | – | | 5 | – | 3 | – | 0 |
| Cortland | | – | | 5 | – | 4 | – | 0 |
| St. John Fisher | | – | | 5 | – | 4 | – | 0 |
| Fairleigh Dickinson–Florham | | – | | 5 | – | 4 | – | 0 |
| Albany | | – | | 5 | – | 5 | – | 0 |
| Drake | | – | | 5 | – | 5 | – | 0 |
| Norwich | | – | | 4 | – | 4 | – | 1 |
| Union (NY) | | – | | 5 | – | 5 | – | 0 |
| Aurora | | – | | 4 | – | 5 | – | 0 |
| Stony Brook | | – | | 4 | – | 5 | – | 0 |
| Brockport | | – | | 3 | – | 6 | – | 0 |
| Buffalo | | – | | 3 | – | 7 | – | 0 |
| Catholic University | | – | | 3 | – | 7 | – | 0 |
| MacMurray | | – | | 3 | – | 7 | – | 0 |
| Trinity (TX) | | – | | 2 | – | 5 | – | 0 |
| Saint Francis (PA) | | – | | 2 | – | 6 | – | 0 |
| WPI | | – | | 2 | – | 6 | – | 0 |
| Brooklyn | | – | | 2 | – | 7 | – | 0 |
| Colorado College | | – | | 2 | – | 7 | – | 0 |
| Duquesne | | – | | 2 | – | 7 | – | 0 |
| Frostburg State | | – | | 2 | – | 8 | – | 0 |
| Saint Peter's | | – | | 2 | – | 8 | – | 0 |
| Maritime | | – | | 1 | – | 6 | – | 0 |
| Marist | | – | | 1 | – | 7 | – | 0 |
| Quincy | | – | | 1 | – | 7 | – | 0 |
| Washington (MO) | | – | | 1 | – | 8 | – | 0 |
| Western Connecticut State | | – | | 1 | – | 8 | – | 1 |
| Buffalo State | | – | | 1 | – | 9 | – | 0 |
| Wesley | | – | | 0 | – | 9 | – | 0 |
^ – NCAA Division III playoff participant

== Conference champions ==
Conference champions
- Centennial Conference – Franklin & Marshall
- College Athletic Conference – Rhodes
- College Conference of Illinois and Wisconsin – Augustana (IL)
- Independent College Athletic Conference‡ – Ithaca
- Iowa Intercollegiate Athletic Conference – Central (IA)
- Michigan Intercollegiate Athletic Association – Hope
- Middle Atlantic Conference – Susquehanna and Widener
- Midwest Collegiate Athletic Conference – St. Norbert
- Minnesota Intercollegiate Athletic Conference – Gustavus Adolphus
- New England Football Conference – Plymouth State
- New Jersey State Athletic Conference – Kean
- North Coast Athletic Conference – Allegheny
- Ohio Athletic Conference – Capital
- Old Dominion Athletic Conference – Hampden–Sydney
- Presidents' Athletic Conference – Washington & Jefferson
- Southern California Intercollegiate Athletic Conference – Claremont–Mudd–Scripps and Occidental
- Texas Intercollegiate Athletic Association – Tarleton State
- Upper Midwest Athletic Conference – Mount Senario
- Wisconsin Intercollegiate Athletic Conference – Wisconsin–River Falls and Wisconsin–Whitewater

== Postseason ==
The 1987 NCAA Division III Football Championship playoffs were the 15th annual single-elimination tournament to determine the national champion of men's NCAA Division III college football. The championship Stagg Bowl game was held at Garrett-Harrison Stadium in Phenix City, Alabama for the 13th time and for the third consecutive year. Like the previous two tournaments, this year's bracket featured sixteen teams.

=== Playoff bracket ===
First Round; Campus Sites
Wagner | 38
Rochester (NY) | 14
Fordham | 41
Hofstra | 6
Washington & Jefferson | 23*
Allegheny | 17
Emory and Henry | 49
Ferrum | 7
Dayton | 52
Capital | 28
Augustana (IL) | 53
Hiram | 0
Saint John's (MN) | 7
Gustavus Adolphus | 3
Central (IA) | 17
Menlo | 0

Quarterfinals; Campus Sites
Wagner | 21
Fordham | 0
Washington & Jefferson | 16
Emory & Henry | 23
Dayton | 38
Augustana (IL) | 36
Saint John's (MN) | 3
Central (IA) | 13

Semifinals; Campus Sites
Wagner | 20
Emory & Henry | 13
Dayton | 34
Central (IA) | 0

National Championship Game; Garrett-Harrison Stadium; Phenix City, Alabama
Wagner | 19
Dayton | 3

== See also ==
- 1987 NCAA Division I-A football season
- 1987 NCAA Division I-AA football season
- 1987 NCAA Division II football season
