= Rex Huigens =

American football and golf coach

Biographical details
- Born: c. 1948

Playing career

Football
- c. 1969: La Verne

Coaching career (HC unless noted)

Football
- 1970–1990: La Verne (assistant)
- 1991–1994: La Verne

Head coaching record
- Overall: 30–6–1 (football)
- Tournaments: Football; 0–1 (NCAA D-III playoff)

Accomplishments and honors

Championships
- Football; 2 SCIAC (1993–1994)

Rex Huigens (born c. 1948) is an American former football and golf coach. He served as the head football coach at the University of La Verne in La Verne, California from 1991 to 1994, compiling a record of 30–6–1. Huigens was also the head golf coach at La Verne.

== Head coaching record ==
| Year | Team | Overall | Conference | Standing | Bowl/playoffs |
|---|---|---|---|---|---|
La Verne Leopards (Southern California Intercollegiate Athletic Conference) (1991–1994)
| 1991 | La Verne | 7–2 | 4–1 | 2nd | |
| 1992 | La Verne | 7–1–1 | 5–1 | 2nd | |
| 1993 | La Verne | 7–2 | 6–0 | 1st | |
| 1994 | La Verne | 9–1 | 6–0 | 1st | W NCAA Division III First Round |
| La Verne: | | 30–6–1 | 21–2 | | |
| Total: | | 30–6–1 | | | |
National championship Conference title Conference division title or championship game berth
