= ACFC =

The abbreviation ACFC may refer to:

- Atlantic Central Football Conference

It may also refer to one of the following football (soccer) clubs:

- Adama City F.C.
- Adelaide City FC
- Almere City FC
- Angel City FC
- Arema Cronus F.C.
- Armagh City F.C.
- Atherton Collieries F.C.
- Auckland City FC
- Awassa City F.C.
