= 2020 Wesley Wolverines football team =

American college football season

2020 Wesley Wolverines football
- Conference: New Jersey Athletic Conference
- Record: 2–1 (2–1 NJAC)
- Head coach: Chip Knapp (3rd season)
- Home stadium: Drass Field at Scott D. Miller Stadium

2020 New Jersey Athletic Conference football standings
	Conf.			Overall
Team	W		L	W		L
Salisbury $	2	–	0	2	–	0
Wesley	2	–	1	2	–	1
Montclair State	2	–	1	2	–	1
William Paterson	0	–	1	0	–	1
Kean	0	–	1	0	–	1
Christopher Newport	0	–	2	0	–	2
$ – Conference champion; Notes: Due to COVID-19, the New Jersey Athletic Conference suspended the fall 2020 football season. TCNJ and Rowan opted out of the spring season.

The 2020 Wesley Wolverines football team represented Wesley College in the 2020–21 NCAA Division III football season. They were led by third-year head coach Chip Knapp and played their home games at Drass Field at Scott D. Miller Stadium. They were a member of the New Jersey Athletic Conference (NJAC) and finished with a record of 2–1, placing second in the conference. It was the school's final season, as the college was sold to Delaware State University following the year.

== Schedule ==
Date	Time	Opponent	Site	Result	Source
March 13		Salisbury	Drass Field at Scott D. Miller Stadium; Dover, DE (Route 13 Rivalry)	L 30–32	
March 20		at Montclair State	Sprague Field; Montclair, NJ	W 20–13	
April 2		at Christopher Newport	TowneBank Stadium; Newport News, VA	W 23–7	
April 9		Stevenson*	Drass Field at Scott D. Miller Stadium; Dover, DE	Cancelled	
April 17	7:00 p.m.	Lackawanna*	Drass Field at Scott D. Miller Stadium; Dover, DE	Cancelled	
*Non-conference game
