= Sherman Wood =

American football coach and player

Current position
- Title: Head coach
- Team: Salisbury
- Conference: NJAC
- Record: 203–83

Biographical details
- Born: c. 1960 (age 65–66)

Playing career
- c. 1980: Salisbury State
- Position: Defensive back

Coaching career (HC unless noted)
- 1984: Salisbury State (volunteer)
- 1985: Salisbury State (GA)
- 1986: Bowie State (GA/DB/ST)
- 1987–1988: Bowie State (assistant)
- 1989–1991: Bowie State (AHC/DC)
- 1992: Virginia Union (AHC)
- 1993–1998: Bowie State
- 1999–present: Salisbury State / Salisbury

Head coaching record
- Overall: 224–121–1
- Bowls: 6–3
- Tournaments: 8–12 (NCAA D-III playoffs)

Accomplishments and honors

Championships
- 2 ACFC (2004–2005); 2 E8 (2011–2012); 5 NJAC (2019–2022, 2024)

Awards
- ACFC Coach of the Year (2004); 2× E8 Coach of the Year (2011–2012); 3× NJAC Coach of the Year (2015, 2019, 2021); AFCA NCAA Division III COY (2024)

Sherman Wood (born c. 1960) is an American college football coach and former player. He is the head football coach for Salisbury University, a position he has held since 1999. Wood served as the head football coach at Bowie State University in Bowie, Maryland from 1993 to 1998.

Wood played college football at Salisbury—then known as Salisbury State—as a defensive back, earning NCAA Division III All-America honors.

== Head coaching record ==
Year	Team	Overall	Conference	Standing	Bowl/playoffs	AFCA^{#}	D3^{°}
Bowie State Bulldogs (Central Intercollegiate Athletic Association) (1993–1999)
1993	Bowie State	3–6–1	3–4–1	6th			
1994	Bowie State	2–8	2–6	9th			
1995	Bowie State	3–8	2–6	7th			
1996	Bowie State	3–7	2–6	8th			
1997	Bowie State	4–6	2–5	7th			
1998	Bowie State	6–3	4–3	T–3rd			
Bowie State:		21–38–1	15–30–1				
Salisbury State Sea Gulls (Atlantic Central Football Conference) (1999–2000)
1999	Salisbury State	2–7	2–4	T–4th			
2000	Salisbury State	5–5	3–3	T–4th			
Salisbury Sea Gulls (Atlantic Central Football Conference) (2001–2010)
2001	Salisbury	4–6	1–2	3rd			
2002	Salisbury	9–2	2–1	2nd	L NCAA Division III First Round		
2003	Salisbury	7–2	2–1	2nd			
2004	Salisbury	10–1	5–0	1st	L NCAA Division III First Round		
2005	Salisbury	8–3	4–1	T–1st	W Southeast		
2006	Salisbury	6–5	2–2	T–2nd	W South Atlantic		
2007	Salisbury	9–2	3–1	2nd	L NCAA Division III First Round		14
2008	Salisbury	9–2	2–1	2nd	W Southwest		24
2009	Salisbury	5–6	2–1	2nd	L Southwest		
2010	Salisbury	7–3	2–1	2nd	L NCAA Division III First Round		
Salisbury Sea Gulls (Empire 8) (2011–2014)
2011	Salisbury	11–2	7–0	1st	L NCAA Division III Quarterfinal		9
2012	Salisbury	9–3	6–1	1st	L NCAA Division III Second Round		11
2013	Salisbury	7–4	5–2	T–2nd	W South Atlantic		
2014	Salisbury	7–4	5–3	T–3rd	W South Atlantic		
Salisbury Sea Gulls (New Jersey Athletic Conference) (2015–present)
2015	Salisbury	7–4	7–1	2nd	L NCAA Division III First Round		
2016	Salisbury	8–3	6–3	3rd	W South Atlantic		
2017	Salisbury	7–4	7–2	3rd	L Robert M. "Scotty" Whitelaw		
2018	Salisbury	8–3	7–2	T–2nd	L Asa S. Bushnell		
2019	Salisbury	11–1	7–0	1st	L NCAA Division III Quarterfinal		9
2020–21	Salisbury	2–0	2–0	1st			
2021	Salisbury	8–2	6–0	1st	L NCAA Division III First Round	17	19
2022	Salisbury	9–2	6–0	1st	L NCAA Division III First Round		
2023	Salisbury	6–4	4–2	T–2nd			
2024	Salisbury	12–1	6–0	1st	L NCAA Division III Quarterfinal	7	7
2025	Salisbury	10–2	6–1	2nd	L NCAA Division III Third Round	12	15
2026	Salisbury	0–0	0–0				
Salisbury State / Salisbury:		203–83	117–35				
Total:		224–121–1					
National championship Conference title Conference division title or championship game berth

== See also ==
- List of college football career coaching wins leaders
