= Bob Swank =

American football coach

Current position
- Title: Defensive coordinator
- Team: Chamblee Charter HS (GA)

Coaching career (HC unless noted)
- 1992–1993: Midwestern State (GA)
- 1994–2000: Methodist (assistant)
- 2001–2003: Buffalo State
- 2004: Akron (GA)
- 2013–2014: Duluth HS (GA) (DC)
- 2015–2018: Duluth HS (GA)
- 2019–present: Chamblee Charter HS (GA)

Head coaching record
- Overall: 4–25 (college)

Bob Swank is an American football coach. He is the defensive coordinator, as well as the head coach of the lacrosse team at Chamblee Charter High School in Chamblee, Georgia. Swank served as the head football coach at Buffalo State College from 2001 to 2003, compiling a record of 4–25.

A native of Hummelstown, Pennsylvania, Swank attended Lower Dauphin High School and Widener University in Chester, Pennsylvania, where he received a bachelor's degree in business administration in 1990. Swank began his coaching career as a graduate assistant at Midwestern State University in Wichita Falls, Texas from 1992 to 1993. He then coached at Methodist University in Fayetteville, North Carolinafrom 1994 to 2000 as an assistant, followed by his first head coaching job at Buffalo State College. Swank's final year of collegiate coaching was in 2004 after a one-year stint as a graduate assistant for the University of Akron football team.

== Head coaching record ==
=== College ===
Year	Team	Overall	Conference	Standing	Bowl/playoffs
Buffalo State Bengals (NCAA Division III independent) (2001–2003)
2001	Buffalo State	1–8			
2002	Buffalo State	1–9			
2003	Buffalo State	2–8			
Buffalo State:		4–25			
Total:		4–25			
