= Mike Drass =

American football player and coach (1961–2018)

Biographical details
- Born: March 15, 1961; Chester, Pennsylvania, U.S.
- Died: May 14, 2018 (aged 57); Dover, Delaware, U.S.

Playing career
- 1979–1982: Mansfield
- Position: Offensive tackle

Coaching career (HC unless noted)
- 1983–1984: North Penn HS (PA) (assistant)
- 1985–1986: North Penn HS (PA)
- 1987–1988: Mansfield (assistant)
- 1989–1992: Wesley (DE) (assistant)
- 1993–2017: Wesley (DE)

Administrative career (AD unless noted)
- 2005–2018: Wesley (DE)

Head coaching record
- Overall: 229–61–1 (college)
- Bowls: 1–3
- Tournaments: 29–13 (NCAA D-III playoffs)

Accomplishments and honors

Championships
- 9 ACFC (1998, 2000–2001, 2005–2010); 3 NJAC (2015–2017)

Awards
- 2× All-PSAC (1981–1982)

Mike Drass (March 15, 1961 – May 14, 2018) was an American football coach. He played college football for Mansfield from 1979 to 1982. He was the head football coach at Wesley College in Dover, Delaware from 1993 until his death in 2018.

== Head coaching record ==
=== College ===
Year	Team	Overall	Conference	Standing	Bowl/playoffs
Wesley Wolverines (NCAA Division III independent) (1993–1997)
1993	Wesley	7–3–1			W ECAC Bowl
1994	Wesley	8–2			
1995	Wesley	8–3			L ECAC Division III Southeast Championship
1996	Wesley	7–2			
1997	Wesley	7–3			L ECAC Bowl
Wesley Wolverines (Atlantic Central Football Conference) (1998–2010)
1998	Wesley	7–3	3–0	1st	L ECAC Bowl
1999	Wesley	6–4	4–2	T–2nd	
2000	Wesley	9–2	6–0	1st	L NCAA Division III First Round
2001	Wesley	7–3	3–0	1st	
2002	Wesley	5–5	1–2	3rd	
2003	Wesley	6–4	1–2	3rd	
2004	Wesley	8–2	4–1	2nd	
2005	Wesley	12–2	4–1	1st	L NCAA Division III Semifinal
2006	Wesley	13–1	4–0	1st	L NCAA Division III Semifinal
2007	Wesley	11–2	4–0	1st	L NCAA Division III Quarterfinal
2008	Wesley	9–2	3–0	1st	L NCAA Division III Second Round
2009	Wesley	13–1	3–0	1st	L NCAA Division III Semifinal
2010	Wesley	12–1	3–0	1st	L NCAA Division III Semifinal
Wesley Wolverines (NCAA Division III independent) (2011–2014)
2011	Wesley	12–2			L NCAA Division III Semifinal
2012	Wesley	10–2			L NCAA Division III Quarterfinal
2013	Wesley	10–3			L NCAA Division III Quarterfinal
2014	Wesley	12–2			L NCAA Division III Semifinal
Wesley Wolverines (New Jersey Athletic Conference) (2015–2017)
2015	Wesley	11–2	8–1	T–1st	L NCAA Division III Quarterfinal
2016	Wesley	9–3	8–1	T–1st	L NCAA Division III Second Round
2017	Wesley	10–2	9–0	1st	L NCAA Division III Second Round
Wesley:		229–61–1	67–10		
Total:		229–61–1			
National championship Conference title Conference division title or championship game berth

== See also ==
- List of college football career coaching wins leaders
