= 1993 Mount Union Purple Raiders football team =

American college football season

1993 Mount Union Purple Raiders football

NCAA Division III champion OAC champion

Stagg Bowl, W 34–24 vs. Rowan
- Conference: Ohio Athletic Conference
- Record: 14–0 (9–0 OAC)
- Head coach: Larry Kehres (8th season)
- Home stadium: Mount Union Stadium

1993 Ohio Athletic Conference football standings
	Conf.					Overall
Team	W		L		T	W		L		T
Mount Union $^	9	–	0	–	0	14	–	0	–	0
Baldwin–Wallace	8	–	1	–	0	9	–	1	–	0
Heidelberg	7	–	2	–	0	8	–	2	–	0
John Carroll	5	–	4	–	0	6	–	4	–	0
Ohio Northern	4	–	4	–	1	5	–	4	–	1
Capital	4	–	5	–	0	5	–	5	–	0
Otterbein	3	–	6	–	0	4	–	6	–	0
Muskingum	2	–	6	–	1	2	–	7	–	1
Marietta	2	–	7	–	0	2	–	8	–	0
Hiram	0	–	9	–	0	0	–	10	–	0
$ – Conference champion; ^ – NCAA Division III playoff participant

The 1993 Mount Union Purple Raiders football team was an American football team that represented the University of Mount Union in the Ohio Athletic Conference (OAC) during the 1993 NCAA Division III football season. In their eighth year under head coach Larry Kehres, the Purple Raiders compiled a perfect 14–0 record, won the OAC championship, and outscored opponents by a total of 582 to 120. They qualified for the NCAA Division III playoffs and advanced to the national championship team where they defeated Rowan, 34–24.

The team was led on offense by quarterback Jim Ballard who set NCAA Division III records for touchdown passes in a season (54) and in a game (eight vs. St. John's in the semifinals). He finished the season with 4,555 passing yards and 54 touchdowns and won the 1993 Gagliardi Trophy as the best player in Division III football.

The team played its home games at Mount Union Stadium in Alliance, Ohio. Ballard threw eight touchdown passes in the semifinal game against St. John's.

== Schedule ==
Date	Opponent	Site	Result	Attendance	Source
September 11	Adrian*	Docking Stadium; Adrian, MI	W 42–0	1,300	
September 18	Muskingum	Mount Union Stadium; Alliance, OH	W 49–21	7,688	
September 25	at Marietta	Don Drumm Stadium; Marietta, OH	W 37–0	975	
October 2	at Baldwin–Wallace	Finnie Stadium; Berea, OH	W 35–7	8,750	
October 9	John Carroll	Mount Union Stadium; Alliance, OH	W 21–0	5,188	
October 16	at Heidelberg	Columbian Stadium; Tiffin, OH	W 24–7	3,988	
October 23	Ohio Northern	Mount Union Stadium; Alliance, OH	W 49–7	4,122	
October 30	at Otterbein	Memorial Stadium; Westerville, OH	W 49–0	719	
November 6	at Capital	Bemlohr Stadium; Columbus, OH	W 66–23	1,700	
November 13	Hiram	Mount Union Stadium; Alliance, OH	W 50–0	4,111	
November 20	Allegheny*	Mount Union Stadium; Alliance, OH (NCAA Division III first round)	W 40–7	5,800	
November 27	Albion*	Mount Union Stadium; Alliance, OH (NCAA Division III quarterfinal)	W 30–16	4,888	
December 4	Saint John's (MN)*	Mount Union Stadium; Alliance, OH (NCAA Division III semifinal)	W 56–8	3,333	
December 11	vs. Rowan*	Salem Football Stadium; Salem, VA (Stagg Bowl—NCAA Division III championship game)	W 34–24	7,304	
*Non-conference game
