= Les Dugan =

American football player and coach (1921–2002)

Biographical details
- Born: September 14, 1921; Asbury Park, New Jersey, U.S.
- Died: January 25, 2002 (aged 80); Lockport, New York, U.S.

Playing career

Football
- c. 1947: Niagara

Basketball
- c. 1947: Niagara

Coaching career (HC unless noted)

Football
- 1981–1985: Buffalo State

Head coaching record
- Overall: 19–24 (college football)

Lester J. Dugan (September 14, 1921 – January 25, 2002) was an American football coach. He was the first head football coach at Buffalo State College in Buffalo, New York, serving from 1981 to 1985.

Born in Asbury Park, New Jersey, Dugan was raised in Neptune City, New Jersey and attended Asbury Park High School, where he played on state championships teams in football and basketball. He served in the United States Marine Corps during World War II, earning a Bronze Star Medal for heroism during the Battle of Okinawa. Dugan played college football and college basketball at Niagara University in Lewiston, New York.

Dugan died at the age of 80, on January 25, 2002, at Lockport Memorial Hospital in Lockport, New York.

== Head coaching record ==
=== College football ===
| Year | Team | Overall | Conference | Standing | Bowl/playoffs |
|---|---|---|---|---|---|
Buffalo State Bengals (NCAA Division III independent) (1981–1985)
| 1981 | Buffalo State | 3–3 | | | |
| 1982 | Buffalo State | 4–6 | | | |
| 1983 | Buffalo State | 5–4 | | | |
| 1984 | Buffalo State | 5–4 | | | |
| 1985 | Buffalo State | 2–7 | | | |
| Buffalo State: | | 19–24 | | | |
| Total: | | 19–24 | | | |
