= Steve Colavito =

American football player (born 1951)

No. 58
- Position: Linebacker

Personal information
- Born: August 9, 1951 (age 75); New York City, New York, U.S.
- Listed height: 6 ft 0 in (1.83 m)
- Listed weight: 225 lb (102 kg)

Career information
- High school: Bronx (NY) Cardinal Hayes
- College: Wesley; Wake Forest
- NFL draft: 1974: undrafted

Career history
- New York Jets (1974)*; Philadelphia Bell (1975); Philadelphia Eagles (1975)
- * Offseason or practice squad member only
- Stats at Pro Football Reference

Steve Colavito (born August 9, 1951) is an American former professional football player who was a linebacker in the National Football League (NFL). He played college football for the Wesley Wolverines and Wake Forest Demon Deacons. He played for the Eagles and the Philadelphia Bell of the World Football League in 1975.
