= Atlantic Central Football Conference =

- Conference: NCAA
- Founded: 1997
- Folded: 2010
- Commissioner: Stephen Bamford
- Sports fielded: 1 (football); men's: 1; women's: 0
- Division: Division III
- No. of teams: 4
- Headquarters: Newport News, Virginia
- Region: Mid-Atlantic

Locations
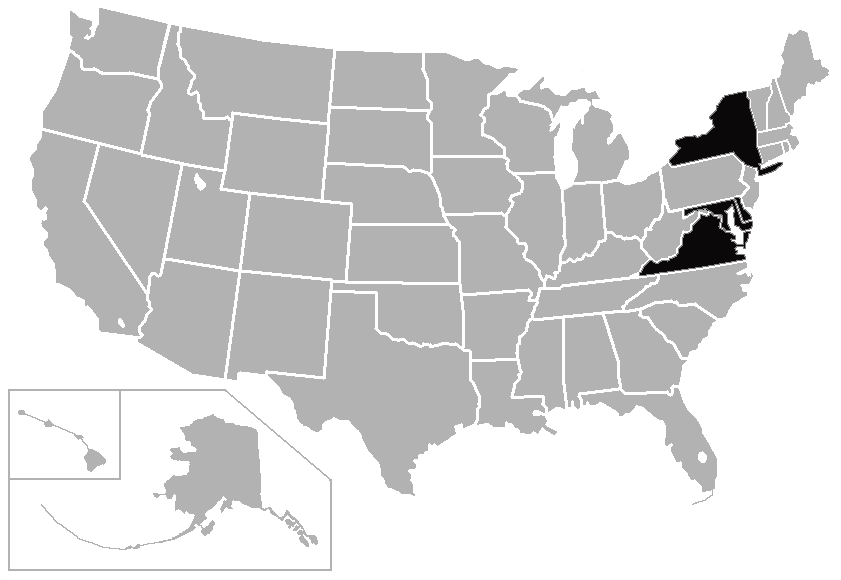

The Atlantic Central Football Conference (ACFC) was a college athletic conference which competed in football only in the NCAA Division III. Its member teams were located in Delaware, Maryland and Virginia. The conference disbanded following the 2010 season.

== Member schools ==
=== Final members ===
Institution	Location	Nickname	Founded	Type	Enrollment	Joined	Left	Current conference (football)	Primary conference
Frostburg State University	Frostburg, Maryland	Bobcats	1898	Public (Note: Part of the University System of Maryland.)	6,133	1998	2010	Mountain East (MEC) (Note: Currently an NCAA Division II athletic conference.)	
Salisbury University	Salisbury, Maryland	Sea Gulls	1925	Public	8,606	1998	2010	New Jersey (NJAC)	Coast to Coast (C2C)
The Apprentice School (Note: The Apprentice School is not a college or university, and is not associated with either the NCAA or the NAIA. However, ever since the school was founded in 1919 it has fielded athletic teams (including football) that compete against small college NCAA/NAIA teams.)	Newport News, Virginia	Builders	1919	Private	725	2001	2010	unaffiliated	New South Athletic Conference (NSAC) (Note: Currently a USCAA athletic conference.)
Wesley College	Dover, Delaware	Wolverines	1873	United Methodist	2,400	1998	2010	N/A (Note: Wesley was acquired by Delaware State University in 2021.)	

=== Former members ===
Institution	Location	Nickname	Founded	Type	Enrollment	Joined	Left	Current conference (football)	Primary conference
Buffalo State College	Buffalo, New York	Bengals	1871	Public (Note: Part of the State University of New York System.)	11,659	2004	2005	Liberty (LL)	S.U. New York (SUNYAC)
State University of New York at Brockport	Brockport, New York	Golden Eagles	1867	Public	8,275	2004	2007	Empire 8 (E8)	
Chowan University	Murfreesboro, North Carolina	Hawks	1848	Baptist	1,260	1998	2000	Carolinas (CC) (Note: Currently an NCAA Division II athletic conference.)	
Ferrum College	Ferrum, Virginia	Panthers	1913	United Methodist	1,100	1998	2000	Carolinas (CC)	
Greensboro College	Greensboro, North Carolina	Pride	1838	United Methodist	1,233	1999	2000	USA South	
Methodist University	Fayetteville, North Carolina	Monarchs	1956	United Methodist	2,215	1998	2000	USA South	

== Championship teams ==
Year	School	Overall record	Conference record
1998	Wesley	7–3	3–0
1999	Frostburg State	8–3	5–1
2000	Wesley	8–2	6–0
2001	Wesley	7–3	3–0
2002	Frostburg State	6–5	3–0
2003	Frostburg State	4–5	3–0
2004	Salisbury	10–1	5–0
2005	Wesley	12–2	4–1
2006	Wesley	13–1	4–0
2007	Wesley	12–2	4–0
2008	Wesley	9–2	3–0
2009	Wesley	13–1	3–0
2010	Wesley	12–1	3–0

== Individual records ==
Note: ACFC records are incomplete. Various sources have been used to attempt to complete the records, including individual schools' websites.

=== Offensive ===
- Scoring

Game: 30 (tied) - DeNelle Hale, Frostburg vs. Apprentice, 10/27/2001
and Leroy Satchell, Salisbury vs. Buffalo State, 10/15/2005
Season: 11.3 points/game (102 points) - Fred Edwards, Wesley, 2001

- Scoring TDs

Game: 5 (tied) - DeNelle Hale, Frostburg vs. Apprentice, 10/27/2001
and Leroy Satchell, Salisbury vs. Buffalo State, 10/15/2005
Season: 19 – Fred Edwards, Wesley, 2001

- Rushing

Game: 282 - Kevin Nelson, Wesley vs. Chowan, 11/6/2004
Yards/Game: 157.9 - Kevin Nelson, Wesley, 2004
Season: 1,579 yards - Kevin Nelson, Wesley, 2004

- Rushing Attempts

Game: 39 - Brandon Walker, Frostburg State vs. Methodist, 11/14/1998
Season: 273 – Brandon Walker, Frostburg State, 1998

- Rushing TDs

Game: 5 (tied) - DeNelle Hale, Frostburg vs. Apprentice, 10/27/2001
and Leroy Satchell, Salisbury vs. Buffalo State, 10/15/2005
Season: 19 - Fred Edwards, Wesley, 2001

- Passing Yards

Game: 476 - Jason Visconti, Wesley vs. Rowan, 9/8/2001
Yards/Game: 333.6 - Jason Visconti, Wesley, 2001
Season: 3,710 yards - Chris Warrick, Wesley, 2005

- Passing Attempts

Game: 65 - Grant Burrough, Frostburg State vs. Catholic, 10/19/2002
Season: 421 (tied) - Grant Burrough, Frostburg State, 2002 and
Chris Warrick, Wesley, 2005
Career: 1,334 - Chris Warrick, Wesley, 2003–06

- Passing Completions

Game: 35 (tied) - Grant Burrough, Frostburg State vs. Catholic, 10/19/2002 and Grant Burrough, Frostburg State vs. Waynesburg, 11/9/2002
Season: 239 - Chris Warrick, Wesley, 2005
Career: 737 - Chris Warrick, Wesley, 2003–06

- Pass Efficiency Rating

Season: 163.7 - Jason Visconti, Wesley, 2001

- Passing TD

Game: 6 - Jason Visconti, Wesley vs. Apprentice, 10/14/2000
Jason Visconti, Wesley vs. Apprentice, 10/13/2001
Jason Visconti, Wesley vs. Chowan, 11/3/2001
Season: 37 (tied) - Jason Visconti, Wesley, 2001 and
Chris Warrick, Wesley, 2005
Career: 100 - Chris Warrick, Wesley, 2003–2006

- Total Offense

Game: 464 yards - Jason Visconti, Wesley vs. Rowan, 9/8/2001
Yards/Game: 321.5 - Jason Visconti, Wesley, 2001
Season: 3,655 yards - Chris Warrick, Wesley, 2005

- Receptions

Game: 16 - Greg Cooper, Frostburg State vs. SUNY Brockport, 10/16/1999
Season: 77 - Marcus Lee, Wesley, 2005
Season Average: 6.27 - Greg Cooper, Frostburg State, 1999

- Receiving Yards

Game: 248 - Anthony Young, Frostburg State vs. Apprentice, 11/6/2010
Season: 1,304 - Mike Clarke, Wesley, 2006
Season Average: 100.4 - William Ray, Methodist, 1998

- Receiving TDs

Game: 4 - Larry Beavers, Wesley vs. Mary Hardin–Baylor, 11/26/2005 and
Mike Clarke, Wesley vs. Dickinson, 11/18/2006
Season: 20 - Ellis Krout, Wesley, 2009

- All-Purpose Yards

Game: 282 - Kevin Nelson, Wesley vs. Chowan, 11/6/2004
Yards per Game: 189.2 - Brian Wise, SUNY Brockport, 2005
Season: 1,892 - Brian Wise, SUNY Brockport, 2005

- Longest Rushing Play

99 yards - Reggie Boyce, Salisbury vs. Chowan, 10/7/2000

- Longest Pass Play

93 yards - Grant Burrough to Anthony Long, Frostburg State vs. Waynesburg, 11/9/2002

- Passes Intercepted

Game: 6 - Jason Tipton, Apprentice vs. Salisbury, 10/20/2001
Season: 17 - Chris Warrick, Wesley, 2005

=== Defensive ===
- Interceptions

Game: 3 - multiple
Season: 8 - Antwain Haskins, Chowan, 1998

- Interceptions per game

Season: 0.80 - Antwain Haskins, Chowan, 1998

- Interception Return Yards

Game: 100 - Duane Manson, Wesley vs. Stonehill, 11/7/1998
Season: 204 - Duane Manson, Wesley, 1998
Longest Interception Return: 100 yards - Duane Manson, Wesley vs. Stonehill, 11/7/1998

- Sacks

Game: 5 - Tone Dancy, Ferrum at Chowan 10/14/2000
Season: 14 - Tone Dancy, Ferrum, 2000

=== Special teams ===
- Scoring (Kicking) Season

Game: 16 points - Jarred Boehner, Frostburg State vs. Wesley, 10/11/2003 (4–4 PAT, 4–4 FG)
Season: 7.1 points/game (99 points/14 games) - Christian Cattanea, Wesley, 2006

- Field Goal Attempts

Game: 5 (tied) - Chris Carlton, Wesley vs. Frostburg State, 10/9/2004 and Mark Sedlock, Frostburg State vs. Westminster, 10/29/2005
Season: 18 (tied) - Brock Boland, Salisbury, 2004 and Mark Sedlock, Frostburg State, 2005

- Field Goals

Game: 4 - Jarred Boehner, Frostburg State at Wesley, 10/11/2003
Season: 1.44 field goal/game - Paul Jacko, Salisbury, 2001

- Field Goal Pct.

Season: 88.9% (8–9) - Joe Cavaleri, Ferrum, 2000

- Longest Field Goal

49 yards - Adam Lanctot, SUNY Brockport vs. TCNJ, 11/5/2005

- PAT Made

Game: 10 - Brock Boland, Salisbury vs. Apprentice, 10/1/2005
Season: 64 - Chris Carlton, Wesley, 2005

- PAT Attempts

Game: 10 - Brock Boland, Salisbury vs. Apprentice, 10/1/2005
Season: 70 - Chris Carlton, Wesley, 2005

- PAT Kicking Pct. (2 attempts/game)

Game: 100% multiple, most 10–10 by Brock Boland, Salisbury vs. Apprentice, 10/1/2005
Season: 95.8% (23–24) (tied) - Mark Sedlock, Frostburg State, 2005 and Adam Lanctot, SUNY Brockport, 2005

- Punts

Game: 11 (tied) - Matt Henne, Chowan vs. Randolph–Macon, 9/26/1998 and Richard Harr, Ferrum vs. Emory & Henry, 10/31/1998
Season: 71 - Tim Loss, Frostburg State, 2000

- Punting Yards

Game: 467 - Richard Harr, Ferrum vs. Emory & Henry, 10/31/1998
Season: 40.9 avg. - Richard Harr, Ferrum, 1998

- Longest Punt

76 yards - Tom Vanik, Frostburg State vs. Montclair State, 9/17/2005

- Punt returns

Game: 6 - multiple
Season: 29 - Darrien Tucker, Methodist, 1998

- Punt Return Yards

Game: 159 - Curtis Gore, Wesley vs. Husson, 10/25/2003
Season: 513 - Curtis Gore, Wesley, 2003

- Punt Return Average

Season: 18.3 yards/return - Curtis Gore, Wesley, 2003

- Longest Punt Return

95 yards - Curtis Gore, Wesley vs. Husson, 10/25/2003

- Kickoff returns

Game: 6 - multiple
Season: 33 - Albert Adderly, Methodist, 1999

- Kickoff Return Yards

Game: 194 - Trae Hille, Apprentice School vs. Wesley, 10/12/2001
Season: 845 - Byron Westbrook, Salisbury, 2005

- Kickoff Return Average

Season: 39.2 yards/return - Tony Hill, Salisbury State, 1998

- Longest Kickoff Return

97 yards (tied) - Kodi Smith, Ferrum vs. Greensboro, 9/19/1998 and Tony Hill, Salisbury State vs. William Paterson, 11/13/1998

== Team records ==
NOTE: ACFC records are incomplete. Various sources have been used to attempt to complete the records, including individual schools' websites.

- Longest Winning Streak

13 games - Wesley (twice), 9/2/2006 to 12/9/2006 and 9/5/2009 to 12/5/2009

- Longest Losing Streak

9 games - Apprentice, 9/26/2009 to 9/11/2010

- Scoring Offense

Game: 77 - Salisbury vs. Apprentice, 10/1/2005
Season: 581 points - Wesley, 2005
Season Average: 44.5 points/game - Wesley, 2001

- Scoring Defense

Game: 0 points allowed, by multiple teams
Season: 7.7 points/game allowed - Ferrum, 2000

- Pass Offense

Game: 476 - Wesley vs. Rowan, 9/8/2001
Season: 336.9 yards/game - Wesley, 2001

- Pass Defense

Game: 1 yard allowed - Wesley vs. Madison, 9/12/1998
Season: 84.7 yards/game - Ferrum, 2000

- Rushing Offense

Game: 477 yards (tied) - Salisbury vs. Greensboro, 9/23/2000 and Salisbury vs. Methodist, 9/21/2002
Season: 330.4 yards/game - Salisbury, 2005

- Rushing Defense

Game: -41 yards - Wesley vs. Averett, 9/10/2005
Season: 80.8 yards/game allowed - Ferrum, 2000

- Total Offense

Game: 643 yards - Wesley vs. Salisbury, 10/29/2005
Season: 485.5 yards/game (4,855 yards) - Wesley, 2001

- Total Defense

Game: -29 yards - Wesley vs. Madison, 9/12/1998
Season: 165.5 yards allowed - Ferrum, 2000

- 3rd-Down Conversions

Season: .440 (84–191) - Wesley, 2005

- 4th-Down Conversions

Season: .842 (16–18) - Ferrum, 1999

- Sacks For

Season: 39 - Wesley, 2005

- Sacks Against

Season: 7 - Methodist, 2000

- Field Goals

Season: .800 (12–15) - Wesley, 2006

- PAT Kicking

Season: .931 (27–29) - Salisbury, 2001

- Kickoff returns

Game: 10 (tied) - Apprentice School vs. Salisbury, 10/1/2005 and Buffalo State vs. Salisbury, 10/15/2005
Season: 25.6 yards/return - Wesley, 1998

- Punting Yards

Game: 467 - Ferrum vs. Emory & Henry, 10/31/1998
Season: 39.1 yards/punt - Apprentice School, 2005

- Turnover Margin

Season: 1.5 avg - Wesley, 2001

- Punt returns

Season: 18.7 yards/return - Wesley, 2003

- Pass Efficiency

Season: 154.93 rating - Wesley, 2001

- Pass Efficiency Defense

Season: 64.46 rating - Ferrum, 2000

- First Downs

Game: 35 - Wesley vs. Chowan, 11/3/2001
Season: 285 - Wesley, 2005

- Fewest First Downs Allowed

Game: 4 allowed - Ferrum vs. Averett, 9/2/2000
Season: 89 - Ferrum, 2000

- Penalties (fewest)

Season: 36 - Apprentice, 2003 (309 yards)

== Yearly standings ==
1998 Atlantic Central Football Conference standings
	Conf.			Overall
Team	W		L	W		L
Wesley $	3	–	0	7	–	3
Methodist	3	–	1	7	–	3
Frostburg State	2	–	2	7	–	3
Chowan	2	–	3	5	–	5
Ferrum	2	–	3	6	–	4
Salisbury State	1	–	4	3	–	7
$ – Conference champion

1999 Atlantic Central Football Conference standings
	Conf.			Overall
Team	W		L	W		L
Frostburg State $	5	–	1	8	–	3
Ferrum	4	–	2	6	–	4
Wesley	4	–	2	6	–	4
Chowan	2	–	4	5	–	4
Greensboro	2	–	4	3	–	6
Methodist	2	–	4	3	–	7
Salisbury State	2	–	4	2	–	7
$ – Conference champion

2000 Atlantic Central Football Conference standings
	Conf.			Overall
Team	W		L	W		L
Wesley $^	6	–	0	9	–	2
Ferrum	4	–	2	6	–	4
Methodist	4	–	2	6	–	4
Salisbury State	3	–	3	5	–	5
Frostburg State	3	–	3	4	–	6
Greensboro	1	–	5	5	–	5
Chowan	0	–	6	2	–	7
$ – Conference champion; ^ – NCAA Division III playoff participant

2001 Atlantic Central Football Conference standings
	Conf.			Overall
Team	W		L	W		L
Wesley $	3	–	0	7	–	3
Frostburg State	2	–	1	4	–	5
Salisbury	1	–	2	4	–	6
Apprentice §	0	–	3	2	–	7
$ – Conference champion; § – Not an NCAA member

2002 Atlantic Central Football Conference standings
	Conf.			Overall
Team	W		L	W		L
Frostburg State $	3	–	0	6	–	5
Salisbury ^	2	–	1	9	–	2
Wesley	1	–	2	5	–	5
Apprentice §	0	–	3	5	–	5
$ – Conference champion; ^ – NCAA Division III playoff participant; § – Not an NCAA member

2003 Atlantic Central Football Conference standings
	Conf.			Overall
Team	W		L	W		L
Frostburg State $	3	–	0	4	–	5
Salisbury	2	–	1	7	–	2
Wesley	1	–	2	6	–	4
Apprentice §	0	–	3	1	–	8
$ – Conference champion; § – Not an NCAA member

2004 Atlantic Central Football Conference standings
	Conf.			Overall
Team	W		L	W		L
Salisbury $^	5	–	0	10	–	1
Wesley	4	–	1	8	–	2
Brockport	3	–	2	6	–	4
Buffalo State	2	–	3	4	–	6
Frostburg State	1	–	4	2	–	8
Apprentice §	0	–	5	3	–	7
$ – Conference champion; ^ – NCAA Division III playoff participant; § – Not an NCAA member

2005 Atlantic Central Football Conference standings
	Conf.			Overall
Team	W		L	W		L
No. 10 Wesley +^	4	–	1	12	–	2
Salisbury +	4	–	1	8	–	3
Brockport +	4	–	1	5	–	5
Frostburg State	1	–	4	6	–	5
Apprentice §	1	–	4	4	–	6
Buffalo State	1	–	4	3	–	6
+ – Conference co-champions; ^ – NCAA Division III playoff participant; § – Not an NCAA member; Rankings from D3football.com

2006 Atlantic Central Football Conference standings
	Conf.			Overall
Team	W		L	W		L
No. 7 Wesley $^	4	–	0	13	–	1
Apprentice §	2	–	2	7	–	3
Salisbury	2	–	2	6	–	5
Brockport	2	–	2	4	–	6
Frostburg State	0	–	4	2	–	7
$ – Conference champion; ^ – NCAA Division III playoff participant; § – Not an NCAA member; Rankings from D3football.com

2007 Atlantic Central Football Conference standings
	Conf.			Overall
Team	W		L	W		L
No. 5 Wesley $^	4	–	0	11	–	2
No. 14 Salisbury ^	3	–	1	9	–	2
Brockport	2	–	2	5	–	5
Apprentice §	1	–	3	4	–	6
Frostburg State	0	–	4	2	–	7
$ – Conference champion; ^ – NCAA Division III playoff participant; § – Not an NCAA member; Rankings from D3football.com

2008 Atlantic Central Football Conference standings
	Conf.			Overall
Team	W		L	W		L
No. 13 Wesley $^	3	–	0	9	–	2
No. 24 Salisbury	2	–	1	9	–	2
Frostburg State	1	–	2	3	–	6
Apprentice §	0	–	3	2	–	7
$ – Conference champion; ^ – NCAA Division III playoff participant; § – Not an NCAA member; Rankings from D3football.com

2009 Atlantic Central Football Conference standings
	Conf.			Overall
Team	W		L	W		L
No. 4 Wesley $^	3	–	0	13	–	1
Salisbury	2	–	1	5	–	6
Frostburg State	1	–	2	1	–	9
Apprentice §	0	–	3	1	–	9
$ – Conference champion; ^ – NCAA Division III playoff participant; § – Not an NCAA member; Rankings from D3football.com

2010 Atlantic Central Football Conference standings
	Conf.			Overall
Team	W		L	W		L
No. 4 Wesley $^	3	–	0	12	–	1
Salisbury ^	2	–	1	7	–	3
Frostburg State	1	–	2	2	–	8
Apprentice §	0	–	3	2	–	8
$ – Conference champion; ^ – NCAA Division III playoff participant; § – Not an NCAA member; Rankings from D3football.com

== Awards ==
Year	Offensive Player of the Year	Defensive Player of the Year	Rookie of the Year	Special Teams Player of the Year	Coach of the Year
1998	Brandon Walker, Frostburg St.	J.C. Harmon, Ferrum	Tony Ellis, Salisbury St.	–	Mike Drass, Wesley
1999	Myron Dent, Salisbury St. & Greg Cooper, Frostburg St.	Andre Summers, Wesley	Phil Hairston, Ferrum	–	Ed Sweeney, Frostburg St.
2000	Jason Visconti, Wesley	Tone Dancy, Ferrum & Andre Summers, Wesley	John Boyter, Chowan & Mac Mollett, Salisbury St.	–	Mike Drass, Wesley
2001	Jason Visconti, Wesley	George O'Brien, Frostburg St.	Milo Austin, Salisbury	–	Mike Drass, Wesley
2002	Grant Burrough, Frostburg St.	Mike Simpson, Wesley	Dustin Johnson, Salisbury	–	Rubin Stevenson, Frostburg St.
2003	Grant Burrough, Frostburg St.	Kevin Culbert, Frostburg St. & Brad DeHaven, Salisbury	Omar Muhammad, Wesley	Rick Nistler, Salisbury	Sherman Wood, Salisbury & Rubin Stevenson, Frostburg St.
2004	Leroy Satchell, Salisbury	Brad DeHaven, Salisbury	Jon Lanouette, Wesley	Brock Boland, Salisbury & Ricky Doles, Apprentice	Sherman Wood, Salisbury
2005	Chris Warrick, Wesley	Kevin Culbert, Frostburg St.	Zack Luke, Brockport St.	Brock Boland, Salisbury	Mike Drass, Wesley
2006	Chris Warrick, Wesley	Bryan Robinson, Wesley	Aaron Jackson, Wesley	Christian Cattanea, Wesley	Phil Janaro, Apprentice School
2007	Travis Reid, Apprentice School	Bryan Robinson, Wesley	Collin Blugis, Wesley	Larry Beavers, Wesley	Mike Drass, Wesley
2008	Shane McSweeney, Wesley	Sean Matthews, Wesley	Mana Ohia, Apprentice School	Larry Beavers, Wesley	Mike Drass, Wesley

== See also ==
- List of defunct college football conferences
