= 2012 Buffalo State Bengals football team =

American college football season

2012 Buffalo State Bengals football
- Conference: Empire 8
- Record: 6–4 (4–3 E8)
- Head coach: Jerry Boyes (19th season)
- Home stadium: Coyer Field

2012 Empire 8 Athletic Conference football standings
	Conf.			Overall
Team	W		L	W		L
No. 11 Salisbury $^	6	–	1	9	–	3
Alfred	5	–	2	6	–	4
St. John Fisher	4	–	3	8	–	3
Buffalo State	4	–	3	6	–	4
Ithaca	4	–	3	6	–	4
Utica	4	–	3	6	–	4
Frostburg State	1	–	6	3	–	7
Hartwick	0	–	7	3	–	7
$ – Conference champion; ^ – NCAA Division III playoff participant; Rankings from D3football.com

The 2012 Buffalo State Bengals football team represented Buffalo State College as a member of the Empire 8 during the 2012 NCAA Division III football season. They were led by 19th-year head coach Jerry Boyes and played their home games at Coyer Field. On September 15, Buffalo State went on the road and defeated the three-time defending NCAA Division III champions and top-ranked Wisconsin–Whitewater, 7–6, winning the game on a touchdown pass in the game's final seconds. The victory by the Bengals snapped Wisconsin–Whitewater's 46-game winning streak, preventing the Warhawks from extending the streak to 47 games, which would have been the third-longest winning streak in National Collegiate Athletic Association (NCAA) football history.

== Schedule ==
Date	Time	Opponent	Rank	Site	Result	Attendance
September 1	12:00 p.m.	Cortland*		Coyer Field; Buffalo, NY	W 49–31	1,750
September 8	1:00 p.m.	at Brockport*		Brockport, NY	L 24–38	1,000
September 15	2:00 p.m.	at No. 1 Wisconsin–Whitewater*		Perkins Stadium; Whitewater, WI	W 7–6	5,872
September 22	12:30 p.m.	Alfred	No. 19	Coyer Field; Buffalo, NY	L 17–40	1,355
September 29	12:00 p.m.	Salisbury		Coyer Field; Buffalo, NY	L 7–20	1,029
October 6	12:00 p.m.	Utica		Coyer Field; Buffalo, NY	L 44–51	855
October 13	1:00 p.m.	at Ithaca		Butterfield Stadium; Ithaca, NY	W 21–14	3,128
October 20	1:00 p.m.	at Frostburg State		Bobcat Stadium; Frostburg, MD	W 22–7	1,346
October 27	12:00 p.m.	Hartwick^{†}		Coyer Field; Buffalo, NY	W 27–24	655
November 3	12:00 p.m.	at No. 25 St. John Fisher		Growney Stadium; Rochester, NY	W 17–9	2,145
*Non-conference game; ^{†}Homecoming; Rankings from D3football.com Poll released prior to the game; All times are in Eastern time
