= Lazarus Morgan =

American football coach (born 7/24/1986)

Current position
- Title: Defensive coordinator & defensive backs coach
- Team: Hobart
- Conference: Liberty

Biographical details
- Born: c. 1986 (age 39–40); The Bronx, New York, U.S.
- Education: Utica College (2008, 2014)

Playing career
- 2004–2008: Utica
- Position: Defensive back

Coaching career (HC unless noted)
- 2009: Utica (ST/WR)
- 2010–2013: Utica (S)
- 2014–2015: Alfred (DB)
- 2016–2019: Alfred (DC)
- 2020–2021: Cortland (DC/S)
- 2022–2025: Buffalo State
- 2026–present: Hobart (DC/DB)

Head coaching record
- Overall: 6–34

Lazarus Morgan (born c. 1986) is an American college football coach. He is the defensive coordinator and defensive backs coach for Hobart and William Smith Colleges, positions he has held since 2026. He previously served as the head football coach for Buffalo State University, a position he held from 2022 until 2025. He also coached for Utica, Alfred, and Cortland. He played college football for Utica as a defensive back.

== Head coaching record ==
| Year | Team | Overall | Conference | Standing | Bowl/playoffs |
|---|---|---|---|---|---|
Buffalo State Bengals (Liberty League) (2022–2025)
| 2022 | Buffalo State | 0–10 | 0–6 | 7th | |
| 2023 | Buffalo State | 2–8 | 0–6 | 7th | |
| 2024 | Buffalo State | 3–7 | 1–5 | 7th | |
| 2025 | Buffalo State | 1–9 | 1–6 | 7th | |
| Buffalo State: | | 6–34 | 2–23 | | |
| Total: | | 6–34 | | | |
