= Rubin Stevenson =

American football coach and college athletics administrator (born 1964)

Current position
- Title: Associate athletic director
- Team: Frostburg State
- Conference: CAC

Biographical details
- Born: June 16, 1964 (age 62)

Coaching career (HC unless noted)
- 1992–1996: Frostburg State (DC/ST)
- 1997–1999: Frostburg State (AHC/DC/ST)
- 2000–2007: Frostburg State

Administrative career (AD unless noted)
- 2007–present: Frostburg State (associate AD)

Head coaching record
- Overall: 31–47

Accomplishments and honors

Championships
- 2 ACFC (2002–2003)

Rubin Stevenson (born June 16, 1964) is a college athletics administrator and former American football coach.

== Professional career ==
He is the associate athletic director at Frostburg State University, a position he has held since late 2007. Stevenson served as the head football coach at Frostburg State from 2000 to 2007, compiling a record of 31–47.

== Personal life ==
Stevenson is married to Patti Spencer Stevenson. They were married in July, 2000 and they have two children.

== Head coaching record ==
Year	Team	Overall	Conference	Standing	Bowl/playoffs
Frostburg State Bobcats (Atlantic Central Football Conference) (2000–2001)
2000	Frostburg State	4–6	3–3	T–4th	
2001	Frostburg State	5–4	2–1	2nd	
2002	Frostburg State	6–5	3–0	1st	
2003	Frostburg State	4–5	3–0	1st	
2004	Frostburg State	2–8	1–4	5th	
2005	Frostburg State	6–5	1–4	T–4th	
2006	Frostburg State	2–7	0–4	5th	
2007	Frostburg State	2–7	0–4	5th	
Frostburg State:		31–47	13–20		
Total:		31–47			
National championship Conference title Conference division title or championship game berth
