= Stephen Bamford =

Canadian minister (1770–1848)

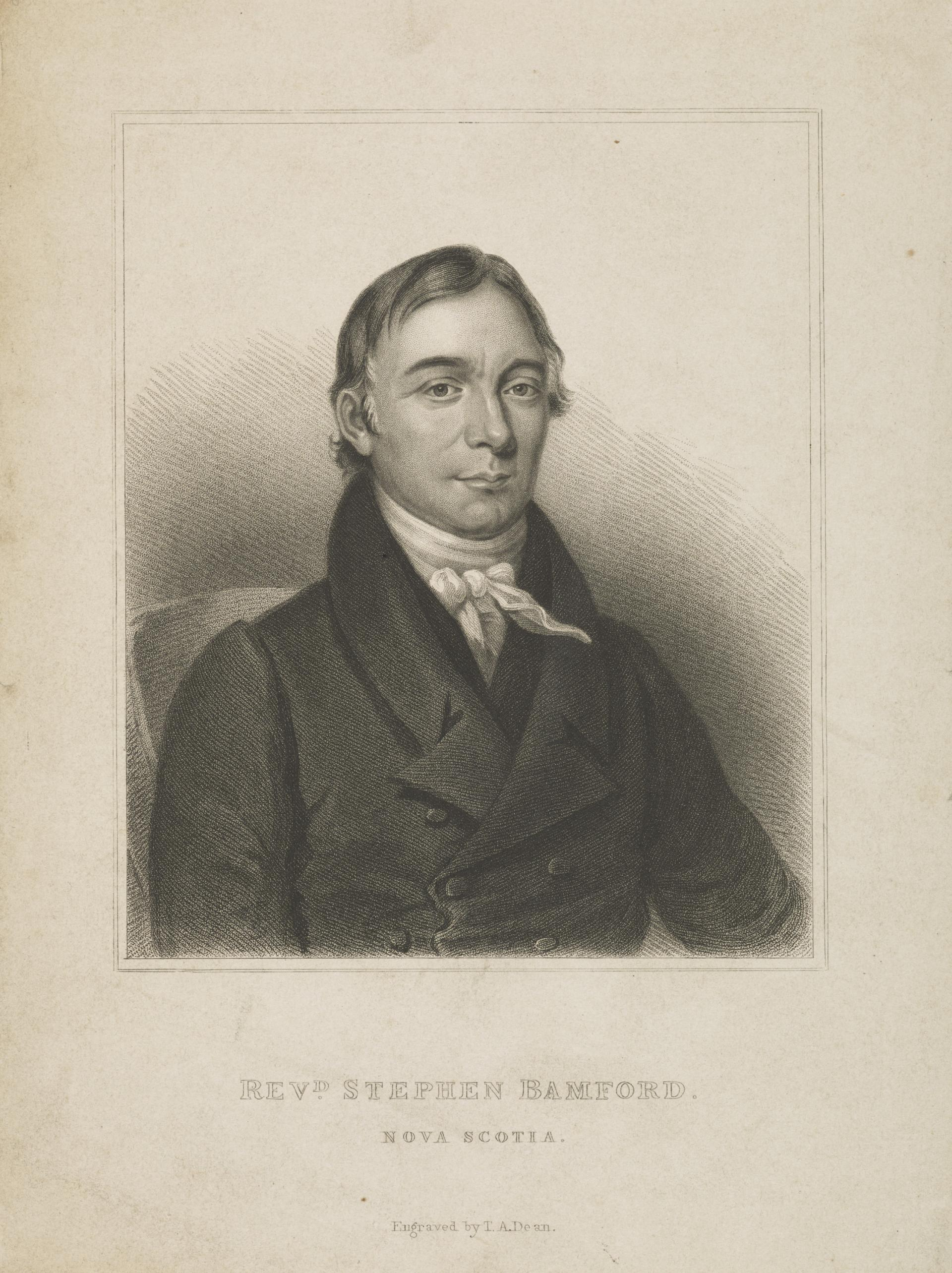
- Born: December 1770
- Died: 14 August 1848 (aged 77–78); Digby
- Occupation: Minister, soldier

Stephen Bamford (December 1770 – 14 August 1848) was a minister and Canadian soldier. He was from England and the first information about his life comes in 1793 when he entered the army and was assigned to the 29th Regiment of Foot.

== Biography ==
Bamford served in various locations and was stationed at Halifax in 1802. He was already a Wesleyan Methodist minister and became popular as such in Halifax where friends bought his release from the army in 1806 to allow his full-time ministry. In 1810 he was ordained in Pittsfield, Massachusetts by the Methodist Episcopal Church. He became an important part of the Methodist community in Nova Scotia, an area that he loved along with his native England.
