= Phil Janaro =

American football coach

Biographical details
- Born: December 23, 1942 (age 82); Hawthorne, New Jersey, U.S.

Coaching career (HC unless noted)
- 1965–1966: Bridgeport (GA)
- 1970–1971: Byram Hills HS (NY)
- 1973: Bridgeport (DC)
- 1975–1978: Davidson (DC)
- 1980–1982: William & Mary (QB/WR)
- 1985–1987: Apprentice
- 1988: Bethel (MN)
- 1989–1990: William & Mary (assistant)
- 1994–1995: Illinois (assistant)
- 2002–2007: Apprentice

Head coaching record
- Overall: 44–43 (college)

Philip Janaro (born December 23, 1942) is an American former football coach. He served two stints at the head football coach at The Apprentice School located in Newport News, Virginia, from 1985 to 1987 and from 2002 to 2007. Janaro was also the head football coach at Bethel College and Seminary—now known as Bethel University—in Arden Hills, Minnesota for one season, in 1988.
