= Darrius G. Smith =

American football coach (born c. 1972)

Current position
- Title: Assistant head coach & running backs coach
- Team: Southern Utah
- Conference: UAC

Biographical details
- Born: c. 1972 (age 53–54)
- Education: Frostburg State University (1995)

Playing career
- 1990–1993: Frostburg State
- Position: Defensive back

Coaching career (HC unless noted)
- 1994: Frostburg State (SA)
- 1995–1998: New Mexico Highlands (WR/DB)
- 1999: New Mexico Highlands (co-OC)
- 2000: IUP (RB)
- 2001: Idaho (GA)
- 2002–2003: James Madison (RB)
- 2004: Northeastern (WR)
- 2005–2006: Northeastern (RB)
- 2007–2014: Villanova (RB/TE)
- 2015–2018: UMass (RB)
- 2019: Bryant (OC/WR)
- 2020–2021: Fort Lewis
- 2022: Southern Utah (RB)
- 2023–2025: Southern Utah (AHC/RB)
- 2026–present: New Mexico (RB)

Head coaching record
- Overall: 0–13

Darrius G. Smith (born c. 1972) is an American college football coach. He is the running backs coach for the University of New Mexico, a position he has held since January 2026. He was the assistant head coach and running backs coach for Southern Utah University from 2023 to 2025. He was the head football coach for Fort Lewis College from 2020 to 2021. He also coached for Frostburg State (1994), New Mexico Highlands (1995–99), IUP (2000), Idaho (2001), James Madison (2002–03), Northeastern (2004–06), Villanova (2007–14), UMass (2015–18), and Bryant (2019). Smith was Villanova’s running backs and tight ends coach during the Wildcats’ 2009 season, contributing to the program’s NCAA Division I Football Championship Subdivision national title. He played college football for Frostburg State as a defensive back.

== Head coaching record ==
Year	Team	Overall	Conference	Standing	Bowl/playoffs
Fort Lewis Skyhawks (Rocky Mountain Athletic Conference) (2020–2021)
2020–21	Fort Lewis	0–2	0–0	N/A	
2021	Fort Lewis	0–11	0–9	10th	
Fort Lewis:		0–13	0–9		
Total:		0–13			
