= The Apprentice Builders =

- University: The Apprentice School
- Nickname: Builders
- Association: USCAA, NCWA
- Conference: New South Athletic Conference (NSAC)
- Athletic director: Jeff Egnot
- Location: Newport News, Virginia
- Varsity teams: 6
- Football stadium: Apprentice Athletic Field (2,500)
- Baseball stadium: War Memorial Stadium (3,750)
- Colors: Maroon and Gold
- Website: www.gobuilders.com

The Apprentice Builders are the athletic teams of The Apprentice School, located in Newport News, in the U.S. state of Virginia. The Apprentice School is a full member of the United States Collegiate Athletic Association and competes in the New South Athletic Conference (NSAC) for men's and women's basketball, football, and baseball.

The school competes in the following sports:

- Baseball
- Men's basketball
- Women's basketball
- Football
- Men's golf
- Wrestling
- Women’s wrestling

== Basketball ==
The men's basketball team has enjoyed historical success at Apprentice. The 1937 men's basketball team won the Virginia State AAU Championship and qualified for the AAU Nationals in Denver, Colorado. More recently, the Builders won the USCAA men's basketball tournament in 2002, 2003, and 2024.

The school also fields a women's basketball team that has regularly competed nationally at their level.

== Football ==
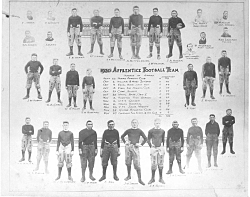
The 1920 football team holds the school record for single season victories with 11 and fewest points allowed with 25.

American football has been played at Apprentice since 1919, only breaking for two years during World War II. The former coach is Phil Janaro, who has led the Builders to a record of 42 wins and 35 losses during his tenure. Former NFL quarterback Norm Snead also served as a head coach.

Until the end of the 2010 season, Apprentice was a member of the Atlantic Central Football Conference, playing teams mainly in the NCAA Division III, although they also schedule games against NAIA teams. The program was briefly a member of the National Club Football Association (NCFA) for the 2018 season. Led by Head Coach John Davis, the Builders won the 2018 NCFA National Championship before transitioning back to an independent varsity schedule in 2019.

== Wrestling ==
Wrestling at Apprentice competes in the National Collegiate Wrestling Association (NCWA) and the team won the Mid-Atlantic Conference Championship for the 2010 season. The 2009 team, under head coach Bruce Shumaker, won the NCWA national championship.
