= 1993 NCAA Division III football season =

American college football season

- Regular season: August – November 1993
- Playoffs: November – December 1993
- National championship: Salem Football Stadium; Salem, VA
- Champion: Mount Union
- Gagliardi Trophy: Jim Ballard, Mount Union (QB)

The 1993 NCAA Division III football season, part of the college football season organized by the NCAA at the Division III level in the United States, began in August 1993, and concluded with the NCAA Division III Football Championship, also known as the Stagg Bowl, in December 1993 at Salem Football Stadium in Salem, Virginia. The Mount Union Purple Raiders won their first Division III championship by defeating the Rowan Profs, 34−24. The first Gagliardi Trophy was awarded to Mount Union's quarterback Jim Ballard.

== Conference and program changes ==
Following an NCAA rule change passed in January 1991, which required Division I schools to conduct all sports at the Division I level by 1993, multiple Division I universities were forced to move their football programs from the Division III level. As such, teams from Butler University, the University of Dayton, Drake University, the University of Evansville, Valparaiso University, the University of San Diego, Jacksonville University, Creighton University, Bradley University, Davidson College, Georgetown University, Marist College, Canisius College, Duquesne University, Fairfield University, Iona College, St. John's University, St. Peter's University, and Siena College. Many of these teams became football members of non-scholarship Division I FCS football leagues like the Pioneer Football League, the Metro Atlantic Athletic Conference, the Patriot League, and the Big South Conference.

=== Conference changes ===
School	1992 Conference	1993 Conference
Buffalo	D-III Independent	I-AA Independent
Canisius	D-III Independent	MAAC (I-AA)
Charleston Southern	D-III Independent	I-AA Independent
C.W. Post	Liberty (D-III)	D-II Independent
Davidson	D-III Independent	I-AA Independent
Dayton	D-III Independent	Pioneer (I-AA)
Drake	D-III Independent	Pioneer (I-AA)
Duquesne	D-III Independent	I-AA Independent
Evansville	D-III Independent	Pioneer (I-AA)
FDU–Florham	D-III Independent	Middle Atlantic
Gannon	D-III Independent	D-II Independent
Georgetown	D-III Independent	MAAC (I-AA)
Iona	Liberty	MAAC (I-AA)
King's (PA)	Revived Program	MAC
Marist	Liberty	I-AA Independent
Mercyhurst	D-III Independent	D-II Independent
Pace	Liberty (D-III)	D-II Independent
Ramapo	NJSAC	Dropped Program
Sacred Heart	D-III Independent	D-II Independent
St. Francis (PA)	D-III Independent	I-AA Independent
St. John's (NY)	Liberty	MAAC (I-AA)
St. Peter's	D-III Independent	MAAC (I-AA)
Salve Regina	New Program	D-III Independent
San Diego	D-III Independent	Pioneer (I-AA)
Siena	D-III Independent	MAAC (I-AA)
UAB	D-III Independent	I-AA Independent
Upsala	D-III Independent	MAC
Wagner	Liberty	I-AA Independent
Wisconsin–Superior	WSUC	Dropped program

== Conference standings ==
1993 Association of Mideast Colleges football standings
	Conf.					Overall
Team	W		L		T	W		L		T
Thomas More $	3	–	0	–	0	8	–	2	–	0
Defiance	2	–	1	–	0	9	–	1	–	0
Wilmington (OH)	1	–	2	–	0	6	–	4	–	0
Bluffton	0	–	3	–	0	3	–	7	–	0
$ – Conference champion

1993 Centennial Conference football standings
	Conf.					Overall
Team	W		L		T	W		L		T
Dickinson +	5	–	2	–	0	7	–	4	–	0
Franklin & Marshall +	5	–	2	–	0	6	–	4	–	0
Ursinus	4	–	3	–	0	5	–	4	–	0
Gettysburg	4	–	3	–	0	5	–	5	–	0
Muhlenberg	4	–	3	–	0	4	–	5	–	0
Johns Hopkins	2	–	5	–	0	4	–	6	–	0
Western Maryland	2	–	5	–	0	3	–	5	–	1
Swarthmore	2	–	5	–	0	3	–	6	–	0
+ – Conference co-champions

1993 College Conference of Illinois and Wisconsin football standings
	Conf.					Overall
Team	W		L		T	W		L		T
Augustana (IL) $	7	–	0	–	0	7	–	2	–	0
Wheaton (IL)	6	–	1	–	0	7	–	2	–	0
Millikin	5	–	2	–	0	6	–	3	–	0
Illinois Wesleyan	3	–	4	–	0	4	–	5	–	0
North Park	2	–	4	–	1	4	–	4	–	1
North Central (IL)	2	–	5	–	0	3	–	6	–	0
Elmhurst	1	–	5	–	1	1	–	7	–	1
Carthage	1	–	6	–	0	1	–	8	–	0
$ – Conference champion

1993 Eastern Collegiate Football Conference standings
	Conf.					Overall
Team	W		L		T	W		L		T
Bentley $	6	–	0	–	0	10	–	0	–	0
Stonehill	4	–	2	–	0	7	–	2	–	0
MIT	4	–	2	–	0	5	–	3	–	0
Assumption	4	–	2	–	0	6	–	4	–	0
Western New England	2	–	4	–	0	2	–	6	–	1
Curry	1	–	5	–	0	1	–	8	–	0
Nichols	0	–	6	–	0	1	–	8	–	0
$ – Conference champion

1993 Freedom Football Conference standings
	Conf.					Overall
Team	W		L		T	W		L		T
WPI $	5	–	0	–	0	5	–	4	–	0
Plymouth State	5	–	1	–	0	6	–	4	–	0
Stony Brook	3	–	2	–	0	6	–	3	–	1
Coast Guard	3	–	3	–	0	4	–	5	–	0
Merchant Marine	2	–	3	–	0	5	–	4	–	0
UMass Lowell	2	–	3	–	0	5	–	5	–	0
Western Connecticut	2	–	4	–	0	4	–	6	–	0
Norwich	0	–	6	–	0	0	–	9	–	0
$ – Conference champion

1993 Indiana Collegiate Athletic Conference football standings
	Conf.					Overall
Team	W		L		T	W		L		T
Anderson (IN) $^	6	–	0	–	0	10	–	1	–	0
Franklin (IN)	5	–	1	–	0	6	–	3	–	0
Wabash	4	–	2	–	0	5	–	4	–	0
Manchester	2	–	4	–	0	5	–	5	–	0
Hanover	2	–	4	–	0	3	–	7	–	0
Rose–Hulman	1	–	5	–	0	3	–	7	–	0
DePauw	1	–	5	–	0	2	–	8	–	0
$ – Conference champion; ^ – NCAA Division III playoff participant

1993 Illini–Badger Football Conference standings
	Conf.					Overall
Team	W		L		T	W		L		T
Quincy $	6	–	0	–	0	9	–	0	–	0
Greenville	5	–	1	–	0	8	–	2	–	0
MacMurray	3	–	3	–	0	6	–	4	–	0
Concordia (WI)	3	–	3	–	0	5	–	4	–	0
Eureka	3	–	3	–	0	3	–	7	–	0
Lakeland	1	–	5	–	0	1	–	9	–	0
Concordia (IL)	0	–	6	–	0	0	–	10	–	0
$ – Conference champion

1993 Iowa Conference football standings
	Conf.					Overall
Team	W		L		T	W		L		T
Wartburg $^	8	–	0	–	0	9	–	2	–	0
Central (IA)	7	–	1	–	0	8	–	1	–	0
Loras	6	–	2	–	0	7	–	2	–	1
Simpson (IA)	5	–	3	–	0	5	–	5	–	0
Luther	3	–	5	–	0	4	–	6	–	0
Buena Vista	3	–	5	–	0	3	–	6	–	0
Upper Iowa	3	–	5	–	0	3	–	7	–	0
Dubuque	1	–	7	–	0	2	–	8	–	0
William Penn	0	–	8	–	0	1	–	9	–	0
$ – Conference champion; ^ – NCAA Division III playoff participant

1993 Michigan Intercollegiate Athletic Association football standings
	Conf.					Overall
Team	W		L		T	W		L		T
Albion $^	5	–	0	–	0	10	–	1	–	0
Kalamazoo	4	–	1	–	0	7	–	2	–	0
Hope	3	–	2	–	0	5	–	4	–	0
Alma	2	–	3	–	0	2	–	7	–	0
Adrian	1	–	4	–	0	2	–	7	–	0
Olivet	0	–	5	–	0	1	–	8	–	0
$ – Conference champion; ^ – NCAA Division III playoff participant

1993 Middle Atlantic Conference football standings
	Conf.					Overall
Team	W		L		T	W		L		T
Commonwealth
Moravian x^	4	–	1	–	0	8	–	3	–	0
Susquehanna	3	–	2	–	0	6	–	4	–	0
Widener	3	–	2	–	0	6	–	4	–	0
Lebanon Valley	3	–	2	–	0	5	–	5	–	0
Albright	1	–	4	–	0	3	–	7	–	0
Juniata	1	–	4	–	0	1	–	9	–	0
Freedom
Wilkes x^	5	–	0	–	0	10	–	1	–	0
Fairleigh Dickinson–Florham	4	–	1	–	0	8	–	3	–	0
Lycoming	3	–	2	–	0	6	–	4	–	0
Delaware Valley	2	–	3	–	0	2	–	8	–	0
Upsala	1	–	4	–	0	1	–	8	–	0
King's (PA)	0	–	5	–	0	1	–	9	–	0
x – Division champion/co-champions; ^ – NCAA Division III playoff participant

1993 Midwest Conference football standings
	Conf.					Overall
Team	W		L		T	W		L		T
North Division
Carroll (WI) xy	4	–	1	–	0	7	–	3	–	0
St. Norbert	3	–	2	–	0	6	–	3	–	0
Beloit	3	–	2	–	0	3	–	6	–	0
Ripon	2	–	3	–	0	5	–	4	–	0
Lawrence	2	–	3	–	0	2	–	7	–	0
Lake Forest	1	–	4	–	0	2	–	7	–	0
South Division
Coe xy$^	5	–	0	–	0	10	–	1	–	0
Cornell (IA)	4	–	1	–	0	7	–	2	–	0
Knox	3	–	2	–	0	5	–	4	–	0
Monmouth (IL)	2	–	3	–	0	4	–	5	–	0
Illinois College	1	–	4	–	0	3	–	6	–	0
Grinnell	0	–	5	–	0	0	–	9	–	0
Championship: Coe 47, Carroll (WI) 20
$ – Conference champion; x – Division champion/co-champions; y – Championship game participant; ^ – NCAA Division III playoff participant

1993 Minnesota Intercollegiate Athletic Conference football standings
	Conf.					Overall
Team	W		L		T	W		L		T
Saint John's (MN) $^	9	–	0	–	0	12	–	1	–	0
St. Thomas (MN)	8	–	1	–	0	8	–	2	–	0
Hamline	6	–	3	–	0	7	–	3	–	0
Concordia–Moorhead	6	–	3	–	0	6	–	4	–	0
Carleton	5	–	4	–	0	6	–	4	–	0
Augsburg	4	–	5	–	0	5	–	5	–	0
St. Olaf	3	–	6	–	0	4	–	6	–	0
Bethel (MN)	2	–	7	–	0	2	–	8	–	0
Gustavus Adolphus	2	–	7	–	0	2	–	8	–	0
Macalester	0	–	9	–	0	0	–	10	–	0
$ – Conference champion; ^ – NCAA Division III playoff participant

1993 New England Football Conference standings
	Conf.					Overall
Team	W		L		T	W		L		T
Maine Maritime $	7	–	1	–	0	9	–	1	–	0
Westfield State	6	–	2	–	0	7	–	2	–	1
Worcester State	5	–	3	–	0	6	–	3	–	0
UMass Dartmouth	5	–	3	–	0	5	–	4	–	0
Bridgewater State	5	–	3	–	0	5	–	5	–	0
Framingham State	3	–	5	–	0	4	–	5	–	0
Massachusetts Maritime	3	–	5	–	0	4	–	6	–	0
UMass–Boston	2	–	6	–	0	2	–	7	–	0
Fitchburg State	0	–	8	–	0	0	–	8	–	1
$ – Conference champion

1993 New England Small College Athletic Conference football standings
	Conf.					Overall
Team	W		L		T	W		L		T
Trinity (CT)	8	–	0	–	0	8	–	0	–	0
Williams	7	–	1	–	0	7	–	1	–	0
Wesleyan	6	–	2	–	0	6	–	2	–	0
Colby	5	–	2	–	1	5	–	2	–	1
Middlebury	5	–	3	–	0	5	–	3	–	0
Bowdoin	3	–	4	–	1	3	–	4	–	1
Amherst	3	–	5	–	0	3	–	5	–	0
Hamilton	1	–	7	–	0	1	–	7	–	0
Tufts	1	–	7	–	0	1	–	7	–	0
Bates	0	–	8	–	0	0	–	8	–	0
No conference champion recognized

1993 New Jersey Athletic Conference football standings
	Conf.					Overall
Team	W		L		T	W		L		T
Rowan $^	5	–	0	–	0	11	–	2	–	0
William Paterson ^	3	–	2	–	0	8	–	4	–	0
Montclair State	3	–	2	–	0	7	–	3	–	0
Trenton State	2	–	3	–	0	3	–	6	–	1
Kean	2	–	3	–	0	5	–	4	–	0
Jersey City State	0	–	5	–	0	0	–	7	–	1
$ – Conference champion; ^ – NCAA Division III playoff participant

1993 North Coast Athletic Conference football standings
	Conf.					Overall
Team	W		L		T	W		L		T
Allegheny $^	8	–	0	–	0	9	–	2	–	0
Wittenberg	7	–	1	–	0	9	–	1	–	0
Ohio Wesleyan	6	–	2	–	0	6	–	4	–	0
Earlham	3	–	4	–	0	4	–	6	–	0
Kenyon	3	–	5	–	0	4	–	6	–	0
Denison	3	–	5	–	0	3	–	7	–	0
Case Western Reserve*	2	–	4	–	0	2	–	8	–	0
Wooster	2	–	5	–	0	2	–	7	–	0
Oberlin	0	–	8	–	0	0	–	10	–	0
$ – Conference champion; ^ – NCAA Division III playoff participant; * - Case Western Reserve held a dual affiliation and played a complete conference schedule in both the UAA and the NCAC

1993 Ohio Athletic Conference football standings
	Conf.					Overall
Team	W		L		T	W		L		T
Mount Union $^	9	–	0	–	0	14	–	0	–	0
Baldwin–Wallace	8	–	1	–	0	9	–	1	–	0
Heidelberg	7	–	2	–	0	8	–	2	–	0
John Carroll	5	–	4	–	0	6	–	4	–	0
Ohio Northern	4	–	4	–	1	5	–	4	–	1
Capital	4	–	5	–	0	5	–	5	–	0
Otterbein	3	–	6	–	0	4	–	6	–	0
Muskingum	2	–	6	–	1	2	–	7	–	1
Marietta	2	–	7	–	0	2	–	8	–	0
Hiram	0	–	9	–	0	0	–	10	–	0
$ – Conference champion; ^ – NCAA Division III playoff participant

1993 Old Dominion Athletic Conference football standings
	Conf.					Overall
Team	W		L		T	W		L		T
Randolph–Macon $	5	–	0	–	0	7	–	2	–	1
Emory & Henry	4	–	1	–	0	7	–	3	–	0
Hampden–Sydney	3	–	2	–	0	6	–	4	–	0
Bridgewater	1	–	4	–	0	2	–	8	–	0
Guilford	1	–	4	–	0	2	–	8	–	0
Washington and Lee	1	–	4	–	0	2	–	8	–	0
$ – Conference champion

1993 Presidents' Athletic Conference football standings
	Conf.					Overall
Team	W		L		T	W		L		T
Washington & Jefferson $^	4	–	0	–	0	11	–	1	–	0
Bethany (WV)	2	–	2	–	0	4	–	4	–	1
Grove City	2	–	2	–	0	5	–	4	–	0
Waynesburg	1	–	3	–	0	3	–	6	–	0
Thiel	1	–	3	–	0	2	–	7	–	0
$ – Conference champion; ^ – NCAA Division III playoff participant

1993 Southern California Intercollegiate Athletic Conference football standings
	Conf.					Overall
Team	W		L		T	W		L		T
La Verne $	6	–	0	–	0	7	–	2	–	0
Occidental	5	–	1	–	0	8	–	1	–	0
Redlands	3	–	3	–	0	6	–	3	–	0
Cal Lutheran	3	–	3	–	0	5	–	4	–	0
Whittier	3	–	3	–	0	4	–	5	–	0
Claremont-Mudd	1	–	5	–	0	1	–	6	–	1
Pomona-Pitzer	0	–	6	–	0	1	–	7	–	0
$ – Conference champion

1993 Southern Collegiate Athletic Conference football standings
	Conf.					Overall
Team	W		L		T	W		L		T
Trinity (TX) $	4	–	0	–	0	6	–	4	–	0
Millsaps	2	–	2	–	0	5	–	4	–	0
Rhodes	2	–	2	–	0	3	–	7	–	0
Centre	1	–	3	–	0	4	–	5	–	0
Sewanee	1	–	3	–	0	4	–	5	–	0
$ – Conference champion

1993 University Athletic Association football standings
	Conf.					Overall
Team	W		L		T	W		L		T
Carnegie Mellon $	4	–	0	–	0	8	–	2	–	0
Rochester	3	–	1	–	0	5	–	4	–	0
Chicago	2	–	2	–	0	5	–	5	–	0
Washington (MO)	1	–	3	–	0	6	–	4	–	0
Case Western Reserve*	0	–	4	–	0	2	–	8	–	0
$ – Conference champion; * - Case Western Reserve held a dual affiliation and played a complete conference schedule in both the UAA and the NCAC

1993 Wisconsin State University Conference football standings
	Conf.					Overall
Team	W		L		T	W		L		T
Wisconsin–La Crosse $^	7	–	0	–	0	11	–	1	–	0
Wisconsin–Stevens Point	6	–	1	–	0	8	–	2	–	0
Wisconsin–Whitewater	5	–	2	–	0	6	–	4	–	0
Wisconsin–River Falls	3	–	4	–	0	6	–	4	–	0
Wisconsin–Eau Claire	3	–	4	–	0	4	–	6	–	0
Wisconsin–Platteville	2	–	5	–	0	3	–	7	–	0
Wisconsin–Oshkosh	1	–	6	–	0	3	–	7	–	0
Wisconsin–Stout	1	–	6	–	0	2	–	8	–	0
$ – Conference champion; ^ – NCAA Division III playoff participant

1993 NCAA Division III independents football records
	Conf.			Overall
Team	W	L	T	W		L		T
Union (NY) ^		–		9	–	1	–	0
Colorado College		–		8	–	1	–	0
Frostburg State ^		–		10	–	2	–	0
RPI		–		8	–	2	–	0
Wesley		–		7	–	3	–	1
Hobart		–		7	–	3	–	0
Brockport		–		7	–	4	–	0
Albany		–		6	–	4	–	0
Buffalo State ^		–		6	–	4	–	0
Ithaca		–		6	–	4	–	0
Maryville (TN)		–		6	–	4	–	0
Hartwick		–		4	–	3	–	1
Ferrum		–		5	–	4	–	0
St. John Fisher		–		5	–	4	–	0
Aurora		–		4	–	5	–	0
Alfred		–		4	–	6	–	0
Methodist		–		4	–	6	–	0
Salisbury State		–		2	–	7	–	0
St. Lawrence		–		2	–	8	–	0
Catholic University		–		1	–	9	–	0
Cortland		–		1	–	9	–	0
Menlo		–		0	–	8	–	1
Gallaudet		–		0	–	10	–	0
^ – NCAA Division III playoff participant

== Conference champions ==
Conference champions
- Association of Mideast Colleges – Thomas More
- Centennial Conference – Dickinson and Franklin & Marshall
- College Conference of Illinois and Wisconsin – Augustana (IL)
- Freedom Football Conference – WPI
- Indiana Collegiate Athletic Conference – Anderson
- Iowa Intercollegiate Athletic Conference – Wartburg
- Michigan Intercollegiate Athletic Association – Albion
- Middle Atlantic Conference – Wilkes
- Midwest Collegiate Athletic Conference – Coe
- Minnesota Intercollegiate Athletic Conference – Saint John's (MN)
- New England Football Conference – Maine Maritime
- New Jersey State Athletic Conference – Rowan
- North Coast Athletic Conference – Allegheny
- Ohio Athletic Conference – Mount Union
- Old Dominion Athletic Conference – Randolph-Macon
- Presidents' Athletic Conference – Washington & Jefferson
- Southern California Intercollegiate Athletic Conference – La Verne
- Southern Collegiate Athletic Conference – Trinity (TX)
- Texas Intercollegiate Athletic Association – Hardin–Simmons
- University Athletic Association – Carnegie Mellon
- Upper Midwest Athletic Conference – Mount Senario
- Wisconsin Intercollegiate Athletic Conference – Wisconsin–La Crosse

== Postseason ==
The 1993 NCAA Division III Football Championship playoffs were the 21st annual single-elimination tournament to determine the national champion of men's NCAA Division III college football. The championship Stagg Bowl game was held at Salem Football Stadium in Salem, Virginia for the third time. As of 2014, Salem has remained the yearly host of the Stagg Bowl. Like the previous eight tournaments, this year's bracket featured sixteen teams.

=== Playoff bracket ===
Regionals; Campus Sites
Mount Union	40
Allegheny	7
Albion	41
Anderson (IN)	21
Wisconsin–La Crosse	55
Wartburg	26
Saint John's (MN)	32
Coe	14
Washington & Jefferson	27
Moravian	7
Frostburg State	26
Wilkes	25
Rowan	29
Buffalo State	16
William Paterson	17
Union (NY)	7

Quarterfinals; Campus Sites
Mount Union	30
Albion	16
Wisconsin–La Crosse	25
Saint John's (MN)	47
Washington & Jefferson	28
Frostburg State	7
William Paterson	0
Rowan	37

Semifinals; Campus Sites
Mount Union	56
Saint John's (MN)	8
Washington & Jefferson	16
Rowan	23

National Championship Game; Salem Football Stadium; Salem, Virginia
Mount Union	34
Rowan	24

== See also ==
- 1993 NCAA Division I-A football season
- 1993 NCAA Division I-AA football season
- 1993 NCAA Division II football season
