= Buffalo State Bengals football =

Football team representing Buffalo State College

2024 Buffalo State Bengals football team
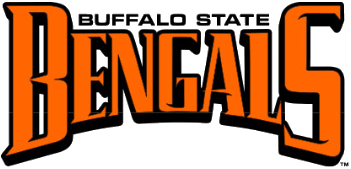
- First season: 1980; 46 years ago
- Athletic director: Renee Carlineo
- Head coach: Lazarus Morgan; 4th season, 6–34 (.150)
- Location: Buffalo, New York
- Stadium: Coyer Field (capacity: 3,000)
- NCAA division: Division III
- Conference: Liberty League
- Colors: Orange and black
- All-time record: 177–206 (.462)
- Bowl record: 4–2 (.667)
- Rivalries: Brockport
- Mascot: Benji the Bengal
- Website: buffalostateathletics.com/football

The Buffalo State Bengals team represents Buffalo State College in college football. The Bengals competes in the NCAA Division III as a member of the Liberty League, which they joined in 2019.

Buffalo State's first football team was fielded in 1980. The team plays its home games at the 3,000 seat Coyer Field, located on-campus in Buffalo, New York. The Bengals are currently coached by Lazarus Morgan.

== Notable former players ==
Notable former players include:

- T. J. Cottrell: Former National Football League tight end

== Year-by-year results ==
Statistics correct as of the end of the 2017-18 college football season

NCAA Division III Playoff Berth	Conference champions	Division champions	Undefeated Season

Year	NCAA Division	Conference	Conference Division	Overall					Conference						Coach	Final Ranking
Year	NCAA Division	Conference	Conference Division	Games	Win	Loss	Tie	Pct.	Games	Win	Loss	Tie	Pct.	Standing	Coach	Final Ranking
1980	III	Division III Independent	N/A	6	3	3	0	.500	0	0	0	0	.000	N/A	Les Dugan	-
1981	III	Division III Independent	N/A	6	3	3	0	.500	0	0	0	0	.000	N/A	Les Dugan	-
1982	III	Division III Independent	N/A	10	4	6	0	.400	0	0	0	0	.000	N/A	Les Dugan	-
1983	III	Division III Independent	N/A	9	5	4	0	.556	0	0	0	0	.000	N/A	Les Dugan	-
1984	III	Division III Independent	N/A	9	5	4	0	.556	0	0	0	0	.000	N/A	Les Dugan	-
1985	III	Division III Independent	N/A	9	2	7	0	.222	0	0	0	0	.000	N/A	Les Dugan	-
1986	III	Division III Independent	N/A	9	1	8	0	.111	0	0	0	0	.000	N/A	Jerry Boyes	-
1987	III	Division III Independent	N/A	10	1	9	0	.100	0	0	0	0	.000	N/A	Jerry Boyes	-
1988	III	Division III Independent	N/A	8	1	7	0	.125	0	0	0	0	.000	N/A	Jerry Boyes	-
1989	III	Division III Independent	N/A	9	1	8	0	.111	0	0	0	0	.000	N/A	Jerry Boyes	-
1990	III	Division III Independent	N/A	9	7	2	0	.778	0	0	0	0	.000	N/A	Jerry Boyes	-
1991	III	Division III Independent	N/A	11	9	2	0	.818	0	0	0	0	.000	N/A	Jerry Boyes	-
1992	III	Division III Independent	N/A	11	8	3	0	.727	0	0	0	0	.000	N/A	Jerry Boyes	-
1993	III	Division III Independent	N/A	10	7	3	0	.700	0	0	0	0	.000	N/A	Jerry Boyes	-
1994	III	Division III Independent	N/A	10	6	4	0	.600	0	0	0	0	.000	N/A	Jerry Boyes	-
1995	III	Division III Independent	N/A	11	9	2	0	.818	0	0	0	0	.000	N/A	Jerry Boyes	-
1996	III	Division III Independent	N/A	10	8	2	0	.800	0	0	0	0	.000	N/A	Jerry Boyes	-
1997	III	Division III Independent	N/A	10	8	2	0	.800	0	0	0	0	.000	N/A	Jerry Boyes	-
1998	III	Division III Independent	N/A	12	9	3	0	.750	0	0	0	0	.000	N/A	Jerry Boyes	-
1999	III	Division III Independent	N/A	10	7	3	0	.700	0	0	0	0	.000	N/A	Jerry Boyes	-
2000	III	Division III Independent	N/A	11	7	4	0	.636	0	0	0	0	.000	N/A	Jerry Boyes	-
2001	III	Division III Independent	N/A	9	1	8	0	.111	0	0	0	0	.000	N/A	Bob Swank	-
2002	III	Division III Independent	N/A	10	1	9	0	.100	0	0	0	0	.000	N/A	Bob Swank	-
2003	III	Division III Independent	N/A	10	2	8	0	.200	0	0	0	0	.000	N/A	Bob Swank	-
2004	III	ACFC	N/A	10	4	6	0	.400	5	3	2	0	.600	T-3rd	Paul Shaffner	-
2005	III	ACFC	N/A	9	3	6	0	.333	5	1	4	0	.200	T-4th	Paul Shaffner	-
2006	III	NJAC	N/A	10	3	7	0	.300	9	3	6	0	.333	N/A	Paul Shaffner	-
2007	III	NJAC	N/A	10	2	8	0	.200	9	2	7	0	.222	N/A	Paul Shaffner	-
2008	III	NJAC	N/A	10	1	9	0	.100	9	1	8	0	.111	9th	Paul Shaffner	-
2009	III	NJAC	N/A	10	2	8	0	.200	9	2	7	0	.222	T-8th	Jerry Boyes	-
2010	III	NJAC	N/A	10	4	6	0	.400	9	4	5	0	.444	6th	Jerry Boyes	-
2011	III	NJAC	N/A	10	5	5	0	.500	9	5	4	0	.556	T-5th	Jerry Boyes	-
2012	III	Empire 8	N/A	10	6	4	0	.600	7	4	3	0	.571	T-4th	Jerry Boyes	-
2013	III	Empire 8	N/A	10	5	5	0	.500	7	3	4	0	.429	T-6th	Jerry Boyes	-
2014	III	Empire 8	N/A	11	8	3	0	.727	8	5	3	0	.625	T-3rd	Jerry Boyes	-
2015	III	Empire 8	N/A	11	7	4	0	.636	8	5	3	0	.625	T-3rd	Jerry Boyes	-
2016	III	Empire 8	N/A	10	5	5	0	.500	8	3	5	0	.375	T-6th	Jerry Boyes	-
2017	III	Empire 8	N/A	11	6	5	0	.545	7	3	4	0	.429	4th	Jerry Boyes	-
2018	III	Empire 8	N/A	10	1	9	0	.100	7	1	6	0	.143	7th	Jerry Boyes	-
2019	III	Liberty League	N/A	10	1	9	0	.100	6	1	5	0	.167	5th	Christian Ozolins	-
	Totals			383	177	206	0	.462	116	45	71	0	.387			
