= Wesley Wolverines football =

Former American football program

- First season: 1888
- Last season: 2020
- Location: Dover, Delaware
- Stadium: Drass Field at Scott D. Miller Stadium (capacity: 2,500)
- NCAA division: Division III
- Conference: New Jersey Athletic Conference
- Rivalries: Salisbury
- Mascot: Wally the Wolverine

The Wesley Wolverines football program was the intercollegiate American football team for Wesley College located in Dover, Delaware. The team last competed in the NCAA Division III and were members of the New Jersey Athletic Conference. The Wesley football program was founded in 1888, being one of the first teams to play in Delaware. The program did not play from 1890–1892, 1911–1925, and 1932–1952. After more than 130 years in existence, Wesley football was discontinued in 2021, when Delaware State University acquired Wesley College.

== History ==
The Wesley football program was founded in 1888, when it was known as Wilmington Conference Academy, but newspapers usually referred to the team as "Dover Conference Academy." The first mention of their football team was an article in The Morning News that reported, "Football has also been started at Dover Conference Academy, and a strong team will be organized." They were among the first teams in the state, tied with the Delaware Field Club and Delaware Fightin' Blue Hens. Though only the Field Club have been found to have played that year. In 1889, the Conference Academy played their first known game, a loss against the Wilmington Friends School. Results for two other games that year have been found, a tie against Delaware College (now University of Delaware), and a loss against Washington College.

The program did not play again until c. 1893. After 1896, the team was referred to as the "Wilmington Conference Academy football team." Wilmington Conference Academy discontinued the sport in 1910, and did not resume it until 1926. Led by coach Josh S. Faulkner in their first season back, the Wildcats, as they were known at the time, finished the year with a 6–1 record. With a harder schedule the next year, the Wildcats compiled a 6–1 record again, only allowing two teams to score points against them. The team declined in the following years and the sport was again discontinued in 1932.

Football returned to the school in 1953, with Wesley now a junior college. The team was renamed the "Whippets" and selected David R. Snow as head coach. Snow left after one season to teach at a school in Massachusetts, and was replaced by Archie Bagwell. Bagwell left following the 1956 season, where the Whippets started 0–5, and was replaced by John C. Copp. Copp stayed one year before being replaced by Al Brent, a former All-America Football Conference (AAFC) player. Dick Smith became head coach in 1961, the year they were renamed to the Wolverines. He was replaced in 1967 by Bob Andrus, who eventually coached for 21 seasons. Andrus played a significant role in turning Wesley from a junior college team to a four-year program, which he accomplished in 1986. He was able to transition them to the NCAA's Division III. However, he retired after two seasons without a single win. Afterwards they hired Tim Keating, who remained there until 1993.

After Keating left the school, Mike Drass, an assistant since 1989, was promoted to the head coach position. Drass later became one of the most important coaches in school history, serving from 1993 until his death in 2018. As coach, the Wolverines compiled a 229–61–1 record, becoming one of the top teams in Division III. At the time of his death, they had made the playoff tournament for 15 consecutive years, but were not able to win any championships. His winning percentage of .789 ranked among the top ten all-time. The team's stadium was renamed Drass Field at Scott D. Miller Stadium in 2015. Chip Knapp, an assistant to Wesley since 1989, was promoted to head coach as a replacement. He led them to a 17–6 record in his first two years. In July 2020, it was announced that Delaware State University would acquire the college, ending the athletics program. The 2020 season, scheduled to be their last, was cancelled due to COVID-19. A schedule in Spring 2021 was later released, with three games originally scheduled. They lost the first against the Salisbury Sea Gulls 32–30, in the final game of the Route 13 rivalry. Following back-to-back road wins, Wesley scheduled a final game against Stevenson to finish with a home game. The game was cancelled, leading the school to quickly schedule another game with Lackawanna College. It was cancelled following a COVID-19 outbreak at Lackawanna. The school officially closed on July 1, 2021.

=== Classifications ===
- 1888–1890, 1893–1910, 1926–1931: Unknown
- 1891–1892, 1911–1925, 1932–1952: No team
- 1953–1985: NJCAA
- 1986–2020: NCAA Division III

== Professional players ==
According to Pro-Football-Reference.com, five Wesley alumni have played professionally in the National Football League (NFL). Steve Colavito was the first; he spent a few years in the early 1970s with the team before transferring to Wake Forest. He went on to play one season for the Philadelphia Eagles. Mark Meseroll was the next Wesley player in the NFL. He played one season during 1974 with Wesley, before transferring to another school. He would eventually spend on season on the roster of the New Orleans Saints, appearing in all 16 games. Clarence Bailey in 1987 was the first Wesley player to start a game, which he did as a replacement player during the 1987 NFL strike. Joe Callahan, who was Division III's MVP in one year, was the first National Football League player to solely attend Wesley College. Matt Gono is the only other Wesley attendee to play professionally; he was a member of the Atlanta Falcons and New York Giants.
