= J. B. McArthur =

American football coach

Biographical details
- Born: April 4, 1900
- Died: November 18, 1984 (aged 84)

Coaching career (HC unless noted)
- 1932: Apprentice

Head coaching record
- Overall: 5–4

James Bushell "Scotty" McArthur (April 4, 1900 – November 18, 1984) was an American college football coach. He was the seventh head football coach at The Apprentice School in Newport News, Virginia and he held that position for the 1932 season. His coaching record at Apprentice was 5–4.
