= Gordon Lamkin =

American football coach

Biographical details
- Born: December 21, 1894; Pittsylvania County, Virginia, U.S.
- Died: June 11, 1972 (aged 77); Newport News, Virginia, U.S.

Coaching career (HC unless noted)
- 1957–1959: Apprentice

Head coaching record
- Overall: 13–8–1

Gordon Emmett "Pop" Lamkin (December 21, 1894 – June 11, 1972) was an American football coach. He was the 16th head football coach at The Apprentice School in Newport News, Virginia and he held that position for three seasons, from 1957 until 1959. His coaching record at Apprentice was 13–8–1.
