= Jill Biden =

First Lady of the United States from 2021 to 2025

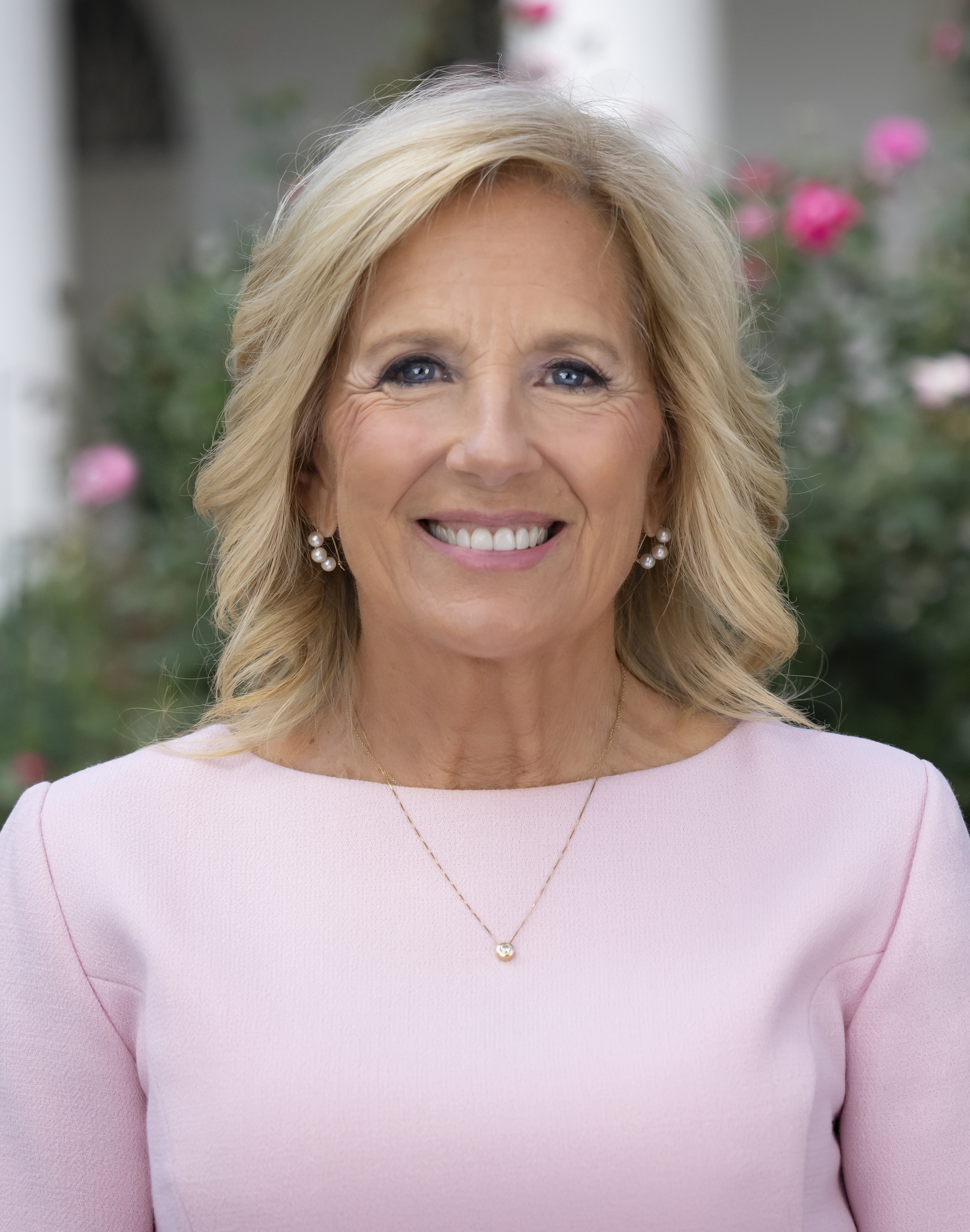
- Official portrait, 2023

First Lady of the United States
- In role January 20, 2021 – January 20, 2025
- President: Joe Biden
- Preceded by: Melania Trump
- Succeeded by: Melania Trump

Second Lady of the United States
- In role January 20, 2009 – January 20, 2017
- Vice President: Joe Biden
- Preceded by: Lynne Cheney
- Succeeded by: Karen Pence

Personal details
- Born: Jill Tracy Jacobs; June 3, 1951 (age 75) Hammonton, New Jersey, U.S.
- Party: Democratic
- Spouses: Bill Stevenson (m. 1970; div. 1975); Joe Biden (m. 1977)
- Children: Ashley Biden
- Relatives: Biden family (by marriage)
- Education: University of Delaware (BA, EdD); West Chester University (MEd); Villanova University (MA)

Academic background
- Thesis: Student Retention at the Community College: Meeting Students' Needs (2006)

Academic work
- Institutions: Delaware Technical Community College; Northern Virginia Community College
- Jill Biden's voice Jill Biden speaks on cancer at an American Cancer Society event. Recorded October 24, 2022

Jill Tracy Jacobs Biden (formerly Stevenson; born June 3, 1951) is an American educator who served as the first lady of the United States from 2021 to 2025, as the second wife of Joe Biden, the 46th president of the United States. She was the second lady of the United States from 2009 to 2017 when her husband was the vice president. From 2009 to 2024, she was a professor of English at Northern Virginia Community College. She was the first first lady to hold a salaried job during the majority of her husband's tenure (Note: The "majority of" qualifier is due to Hillary Rodham Clinton, who was a United States senator during the last 17 days of her eight-year stint as First Lady.) and the first to carry on with her professional career outside the White House for the majority of her tenure as first lady.

Born in Hammonton, New Jersey, Jacobs grew up in Willow Grove, Pennsylvania. In 1977, she married Joe Biden, a widower, and became the stepmother of Beau and Hunter. Biden and her husband also have a daughter, Ashley Biden, born in 1981. Biden has a bachelor's degree in English from the University of Delaware and master's degrees in education and English from West Chester University and Villanova University. She returned to the University of Delaware and received a doctoral degree in education. She taught English and reading in high schools for thirteen years and instructed adolescents with emotional disabilities at a psychiatric hospital. Following this, she was an English and writing instructor for fifteen years at Delaware Technical & Community College.

Biden is the founder of the Biden Breast Health Initiative non-profit organization, co-founder of the Book Buddies program, co-founder of the Biden Foundation, is active in Delaware Boots on the Ground, and with Michelle Obama is co-founder of Joining Forces. She has published two memoirs and three children's books.

== Early life ==
Jill Tracy Jacobs was born on June 3, 1951, (Note: See Dr. Biden [@DrBiden44] (June 3, 2013). "RT @whitehouse Happy birthday, @DrBiden! – Take note @Wikipedia!" (Tweet) – via Twitter. The date of June 5 given in this 2009 piece from The Washington Post previously used in this article is incorrect.) in Hammonton, New Jersey. She is the oldest of five sisters. Her father, Donald Carl Jacobs, was a bank teller and a signalman in the U.S. Navy during World War II who used the G.I. Bill to attend business school and then had a banking career. His family name had been Giacoppo (or a variation of it) (Note: The family name of Giacoppo was subsequently misspelled as Giacoppa at the Ellis Island registry. Accordingly Italian sources tend to refer to the Giacoppo spelling, while some American sources refer to a Giacoppa spelling. Still another earlier spelling is Giacobbo; the head of the family at the time of immigration was recorded in Italy as Placido Giacobbo.) before his father and others in the family emigrated from the Sicilian village of Gesso. The name was anglicized to Jacobs about a month after the family arrived in the United States. Her mother, Bonny Jean (née Godfrey) Jacobs, was a homemaker of English and Scottish descent.

As a child, Jacobs lived with her family in Hatboro, Pennsylvania, and moved when she was eight to Mahwah, New Jersey. Her father was the CEO of the Mahwah Savings and Loan Association. In 1961, the Jacobs family moved to Willow Grove, Pennsylvania, a northern suburb of Philadelphia, and Donald became the president and CEO of InterCounty Savings and Loan in the Chestnut Hill neighborhood of Philadelphia. He held the position for twenty years.

Her parents labeled themselves as "agnostic realists" and did not attend church, but she often attended Sunday services at a Presbyterian church with her grandmother. Later, Jacobs independently took membership classes at nearby Abington Presbyterian Church and, at age 16, was confirmed.

Jill Jacobs always intended to have a career. She began working at age 15, which included waitressing in Ocean City, New Jersey. She attended Upper Moreland High School, later describing herself as somewhat rebellious there while enjoying her social life, along with being a prankster. However, Jacobs has recalled always loving being in English class, and classmates have called her a good student. She graduated in 1969.

== Education and career, marriages and family ==
Jacobs enrolled in Brandywine Junior College in Pennsylvania for one semester. She intended to study fashion merchandising but found it unsatisfying. She married Bill Stevenson, a former college football player, in February 1970 taking the name Jill Stevenson. Within a couple of years he opened the Stone Balloon in Newark, Delaware, near the University of Delaware. It became one of the most successful college bars in the nation. (Note: In addition to local bands, musical artists who performed at the Stone Balloon during this period included a 1974, pre–Born to Run–fame Bruce Springsteen as well as Chubby Checker and Tiny Tim. However the bulk of the Stone Balloon's prominence as a venue for up-and-coming major artists occurred after Stevenson's marriage with Jill ended.)

She switched her enrollment to the University of Delaware, becoming a student in its College of Arts and Sciences, declaring English as her major. She took a year off from college and did some modeling for a local agency in Wilmington to supplement her income. She and Stevenson drifted apart and separated in 1974.

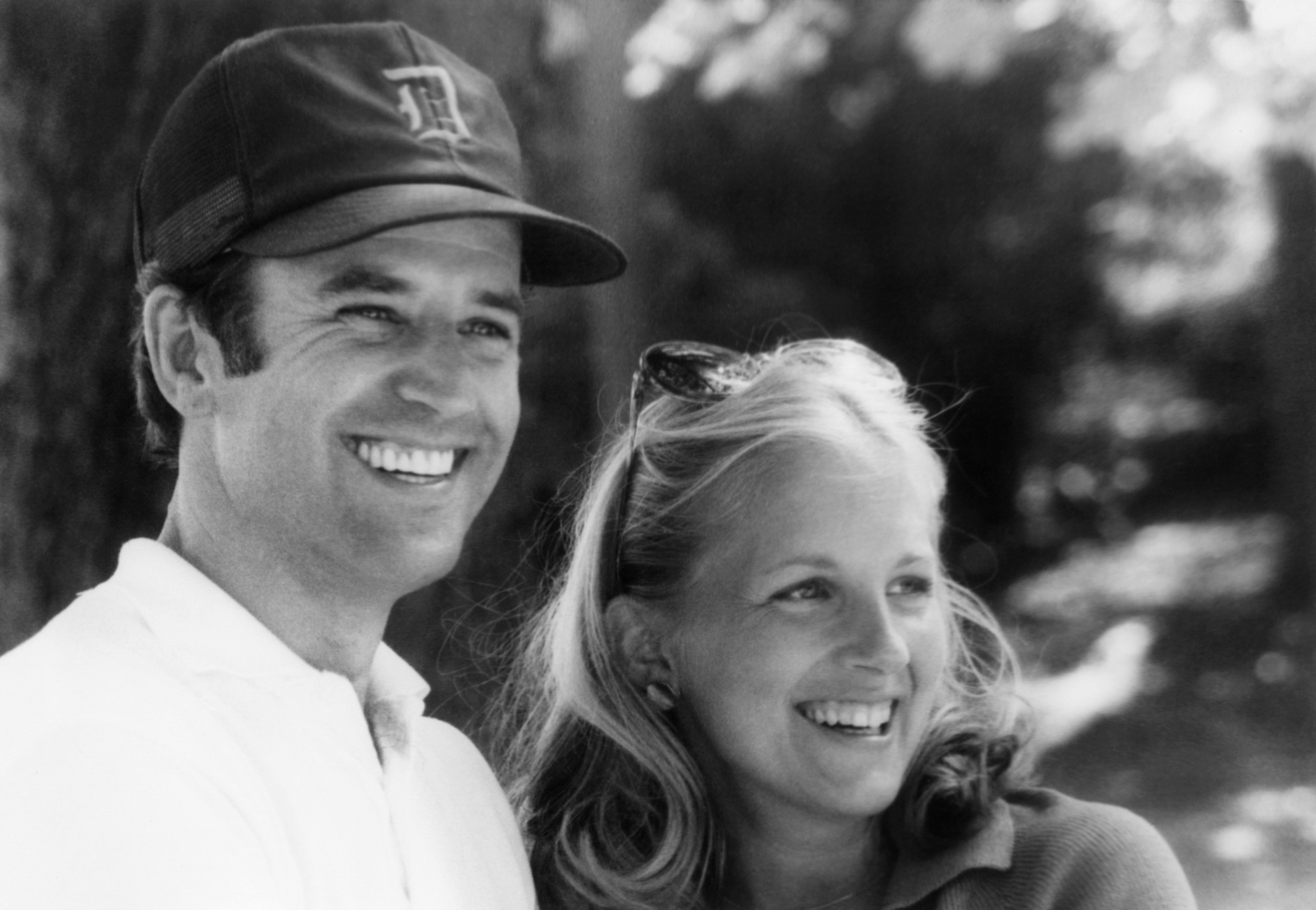
Joe and Jill in the 1970s

She met Senator Joe Biden in March 1975. They met on a blind date set up by his brother Frank, who had known her in college, though Biden had seen her photograph in a local advertisement. (Note: In August 2020, Bill Stevenson told media outlets that this oft-told story about how Joe and Jill Biden met was made up. Stevenson asserted that he and Jill had known Joe Biden and his first wife Neilia going back to 1972, that he had asked County Councilman Biden for help with a liquor license and had held a fund-raiser for his 1972 Senate campaign, and that Joe and Jill had begun an affair in 1974 before he and Jill had separated. In response to Stevenson's statement, a spokesman for Jill Biden said in September 2020: "These claims are fictitious, seemingly to sell and promote a book. The relationship of Joe and Jill Biden is well documented. Jill Biden separated from her first husband irreconcilably in the fall of 1974 and moved out of their marital home. Joe and Jill Biden had their first date in March of 1975, and they married in June of 1977.") Although he was nearly nine years her senior, she was impressed by his appearance and manners, which were more formal than those of the college men she had known. After their first date, she told her mother, "Mom, I finally met a gentleman." Meanwhile, she was going through turbulent divorce proceedings with Stevenson. She petitioned for a half-share in the Stone Balloon club, but the court case ended without its being awarded to her. A civil divorce was granted in May 1975. In 2026, Stevenson was charged with murdering his wife, 64 year-old Linda Stevenson, whom he married after divorcing Biden.

She graduated with a Bachelor of Arts in English from the University of Delaware in 1975. (Note: Sources sometimes report Jill Biden's college graduation as occurring in 1974; news articles and press releases from the university indicate that 1975 is correct.) She began her career as a substitute teacher for the Wilmington public school system, then taught high school English full-time for a year at St. Mark's High School in Wilmington. Around this time she spent five months working in Biden's Senate office; this included weekly trips with the senator's mobile outreach operation to the southern portions of the state.

Jill and Joe Biden were married on June 17, 1977, at the Chapel at the United Nations in New York City. The wedding was described afterward by Joseph Sr. as "a very private affair" that was officiated by a Jesuit priest. (Note: While it has no effect on the validity or legality of the Bidens' marriage, the nature of the ceremony in religious terms is not publicly known. The Chapel is known for being the site of marriage ceremonies for couples of different religious backgrounds and faiths or otherwise would have difficulty getting married in a formal religious ceremony; an investigation in 2023 by the Catholic World Report was unable to determine whether the procedures for marriage in the Catholic Church were followed.) The wedding occurred four-and-a-half years after the deaths of Biden's first wife, Neilia Hunter Biden, and his infant daughter, Naomi Christina Biden, in a motor vehicle accident. Joe Biden proposed marriage to Jill multiple times before she accepted, as she was wary of entering the public spotlight, anxious to remain focused on her own career, and initially hesitant to take on the commitment of raising of his two young sons. The Bidens spent their honeymoon at Lake Balaton in the Hungarian People's Republic. Jill Biden raised Beau and Hunter, and they called her Mom, but she did not formally adopt them.

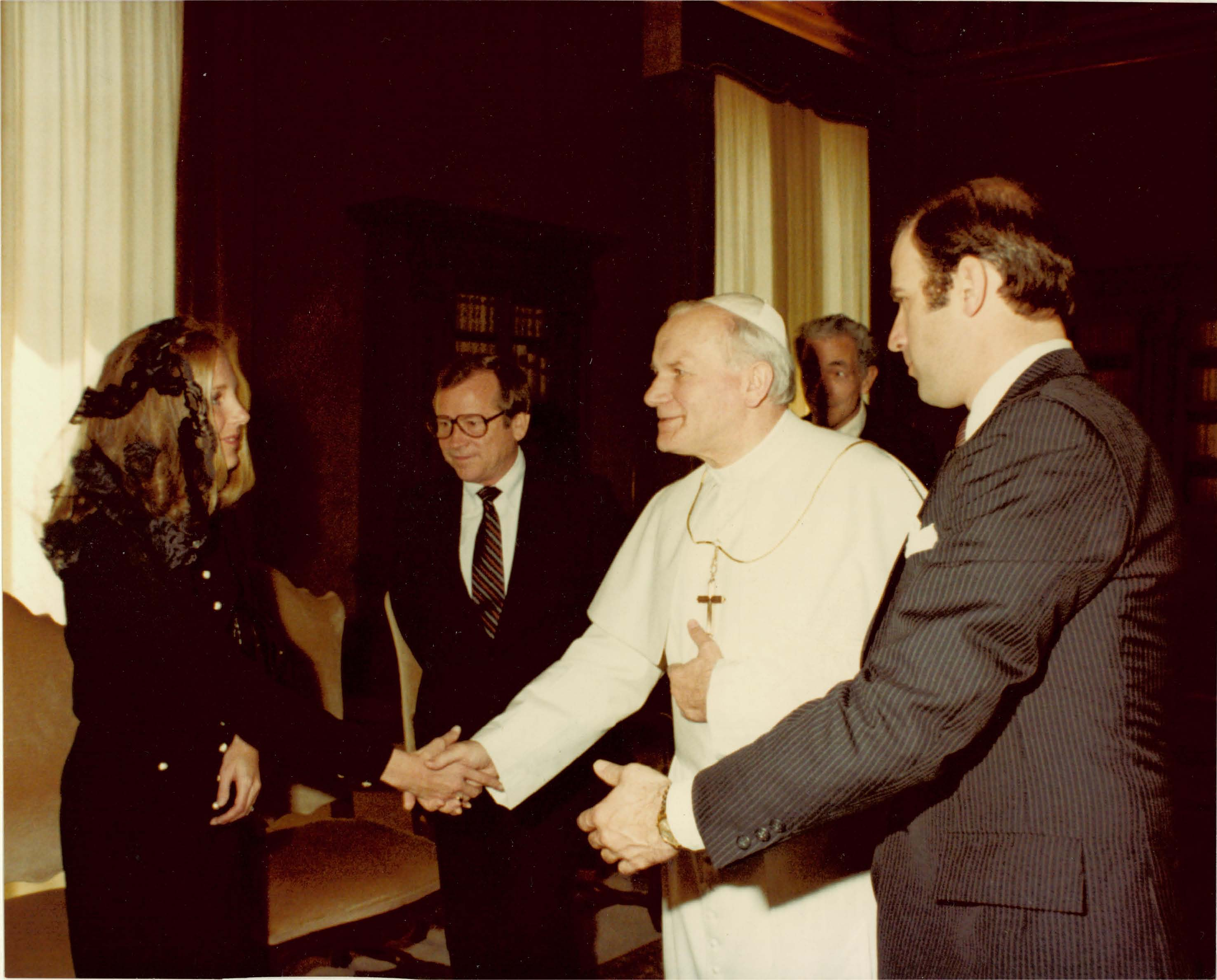
Jill and Joe Biden met Pope John Paul II at the Vatican in April 1980.

Jill Biden continued to teach while working on a master's degree at West Chester State College, taking one course per semester. She graduated with a Master of Education degree, with a specialty in reading from West Chester in 1981. The Bidens' daughter, Ashley Blazer Biden, was born on June 8, 1981, and Jill stopped working for two years while raising the three children.

Biden then returned to work, teaching English, acting as a reading specialist, and teaching history to emotionally disabled students. She taught in the adolescent program at the Rockford Center psychiatric hospital for five years in the 1980s. Biden received her second graduate degree, a Master of Arts in English from Villanova University, in 1987. She was not considered a political person at the time, and during her husband's unsuccessful bid for the 1988 Democratic presidential nomination, she said she would continue her job of teaching emotionally disabled children even if she became the first lady. She taught for three years at Claymont High School. In the early 1990s, she taught English at Brandywine High School in Wilmington; several of her students there later recalled her as genuinely caring about them. In all, she spent thirteen years teaching in public high school.

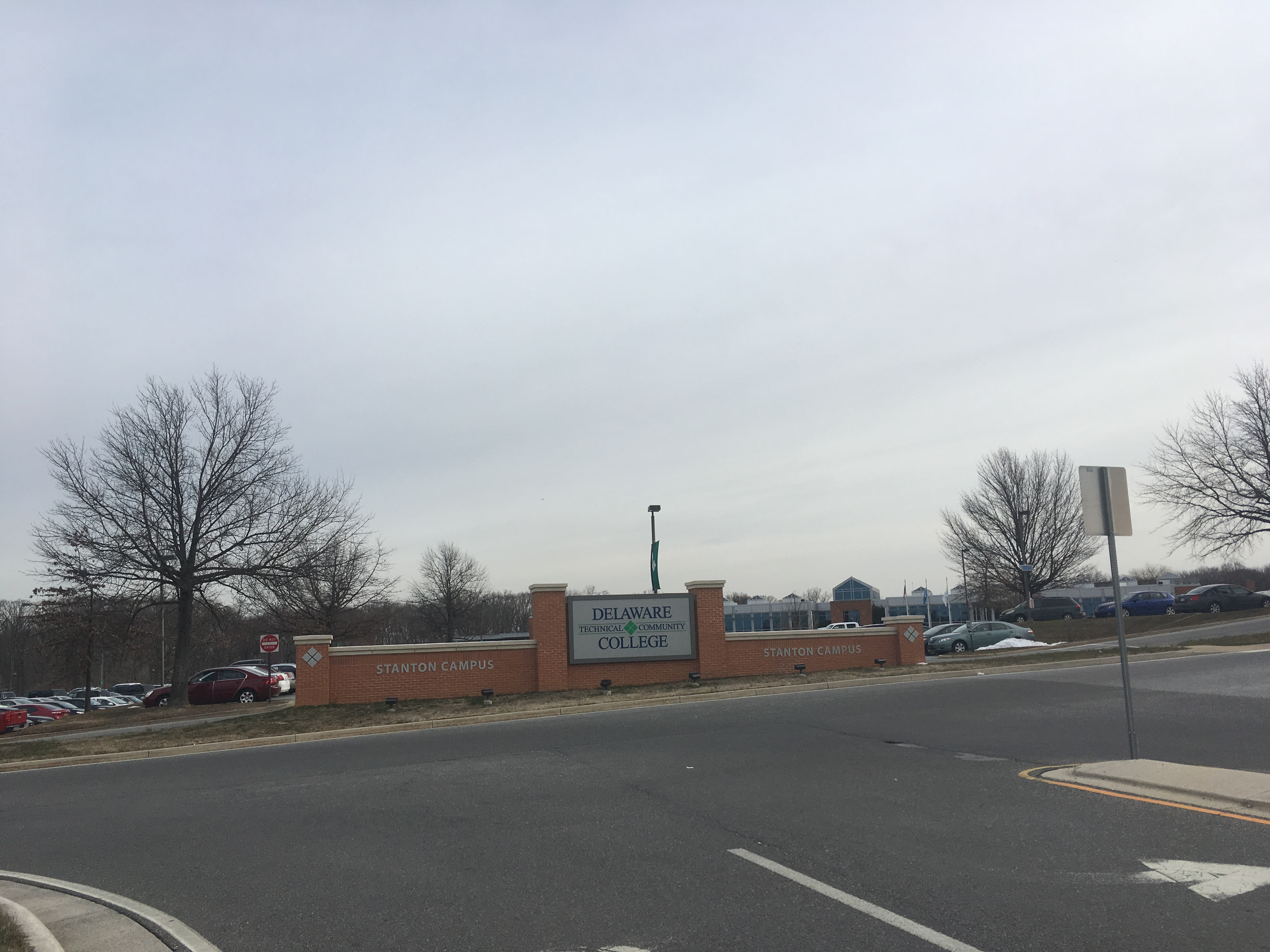
Entrance to the Stanton campus of Delaware Technical & Community College, where Biden taught for fifteen years

From 1993 through 2008, Biden was an instructor in English at the Stanton campus of Delaware Technical & Community College. There she taught English composition and remedial writing, with an emphasis on instilling confidence in students. She has said of teaching at a community college, "I feel like I can make a greater difference in their lives. I just love that population. It just feels really comfortable to me. I love the women who are coming back to school and getting their degrees, because they're so focused."

Biden is president of the Biden Breast Health Initiative, a nonprofit organization begun in 1993 that provides educational breast health awareness programs free of charge to schools and other groups in the state of Delaware. She began the effort after four of her friends were diagnosed with breast cancer that year. In the following 15 years, the organization informed more than 7,000 high school girls about proper breast health. In 2007, Biden helped found Book Buddies, which provides books for low-income children, and has been very active in Delaware Boots on the Ground, an organization that supports military families. She runs five miles, five times a week, and she has run in the Marine Corps Marathon as well as the Philadelphia Half Marathon.

Biden later returned to school for her doctoral degree, studying under her birth name, Jill Jacobs. In January 2007, at age 55, she received a Doctor of Education (Ed.D.) in educational leadership from the University of Delaware. Her dissertation, Student Retention at the Community College: Meeting Students' Needs, was published under the name Jill Jacobs-Biden.

Biden has regularly attended Mass with her husband at St. Joseph's on the Brandywine in Greenville, Delaware. However, she has not formally converted to Catholicism and does not identify as a Catholic. (Note: While some sources have characterized the couple as being Catholics, other sources have described them as coming from different faiths but attending Catholic services together. Jill Biden generally talks about her adult faith in a personal sense, and while her 2019 memoir Where the Light Enters describes her in Catholic settings with her husband or their children, it does not state that she herself is a Catholic. Beginning during the 2020 presidential campaign, her prayer partner has been the wife of a West Columbia, South Carolina–based Baptist pastor. In a 2025 joint appearance on the television program The View, Joe Biden corrected a host who said the couple were both Catholics, stating "by the way, Jill's a Presbyterian".)

== Role in 2008 presidential campaign ==
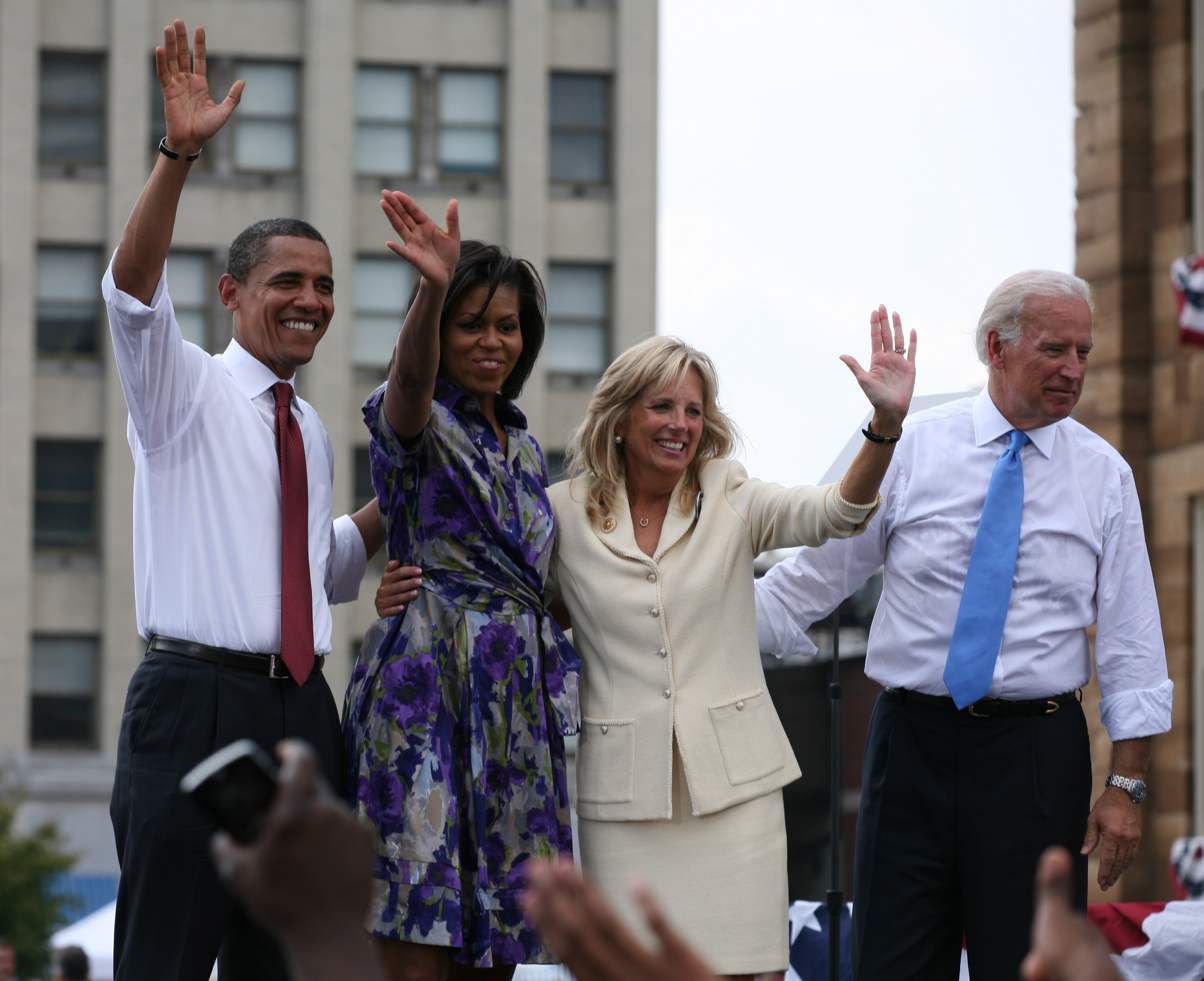
The Obamas and the Bidens in August 2008

Despite personally opposing the Iraq War, Biden had not wanted her husband to run in the 2004 presidential election, to the point where she interrupted one strategy meeting discussing the possibility by entering in a swimsuit with the word "NO" inscribed on her stomach. But following George W. Bush's reelection in 2004, she urged her husband to run again for president, later saying: "I literally wore black for a week. I just could not believe that he won, because I felt that things were already so bad. I was so against the Iraq War. And I said to Joe, 'You've got to change this, you have to change this.'" During Joe Biden's unsuccessful campaign to be the 2008 Democratic presidential nominee, she continued to teach during the week and would join him for campaigning on weekends. She said she would have taken an activist role in addressing education as her chief focus of concern as a potential first lady. She also said she would not seek inclusion in Cabinet meetings and that "I say that I'm apolitical if that's at all possible being married to Joe for 30 years."

Once her husband was selected as the running mate to Democratic presidential nominee Barack Obama, she began campaigning again. She wore a Blue Star Mothers Club pin in recognition of Beau Biden's deployment to Iraq. She was not a polished political speaker but was able to establish a connection with the audience. She also made some joint appearances with Michelle Obama. Throughout the time her husband was running for vice president, Jill Biden continued to teach four days a week at Delaware Technical & Community College during the fall 2008 semester and then campaigned over the long weekend while grading class papers on the campaign bus.

== Second Lady of the United States (2009–2017) ==
=== First term ===
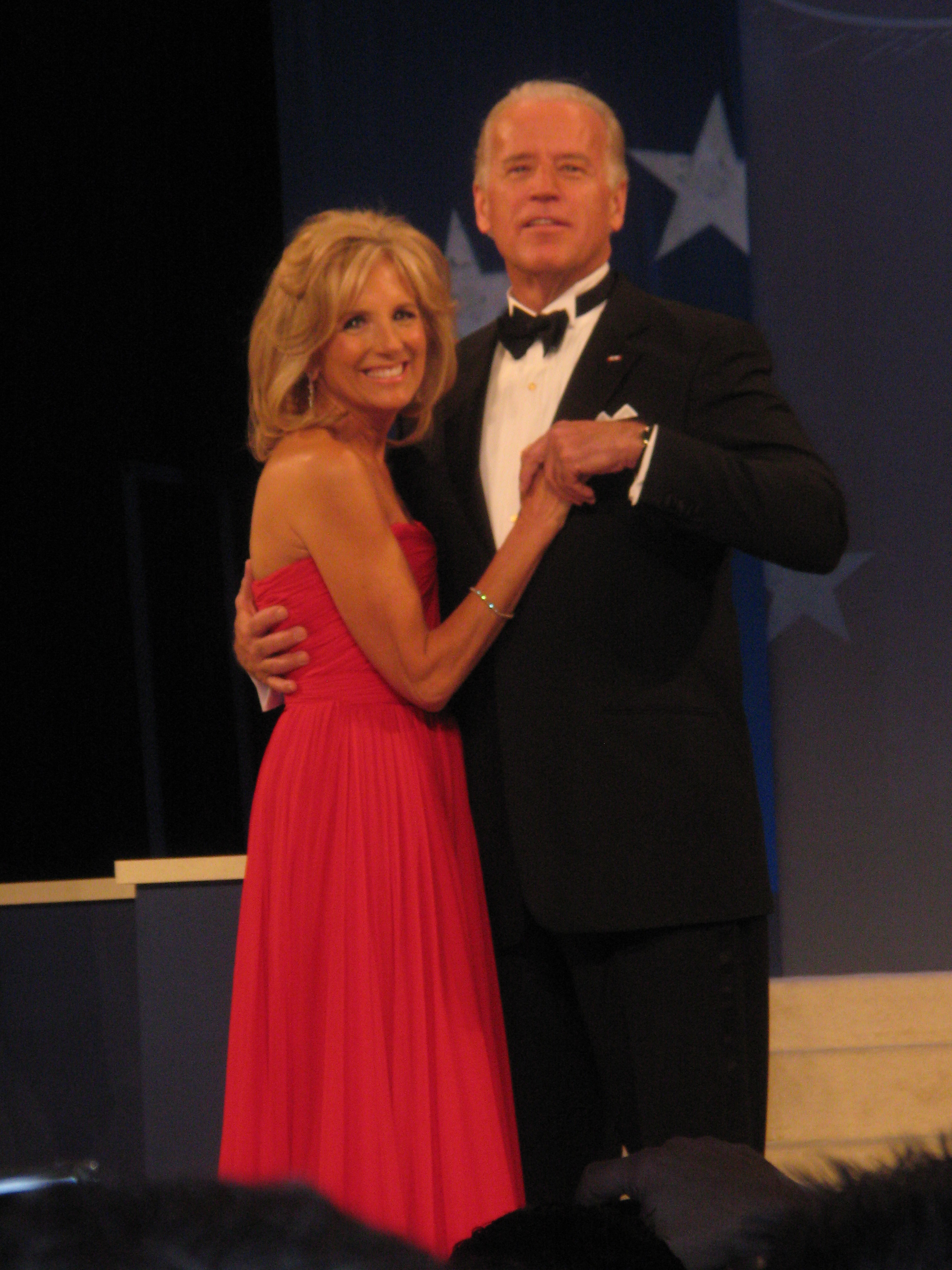
Jill and Joe Biden dancing at the President Obama Home States Ball. Gown by Reem Acra.

Following the election of the Obama–Biden ticket, she and her husband moved into Number One Observatory Circle (in January 2009), the official vice presidential residence in Washington. But as the new second lady of the United States, Biden intended to keep teaching at a Washington-area community college, and several of them recruited her. In January 2009, she began teaching two English courses with an initial appointment as an adjunct professor at the Alexandria campus of Northern Virginia Community College (NOVA), the second largest community college in the nation. It has been rare for second ladies to work while their spouses serve as vice president, and Biden is believed to have been the first second lady to hold a paying job while her husband was vice president. (Note: Some sources state without equivocation that Biden was the first second lady to have a paying job.) In White House announcements and by her preference, she was referred to as "Dr. Jill Biden".

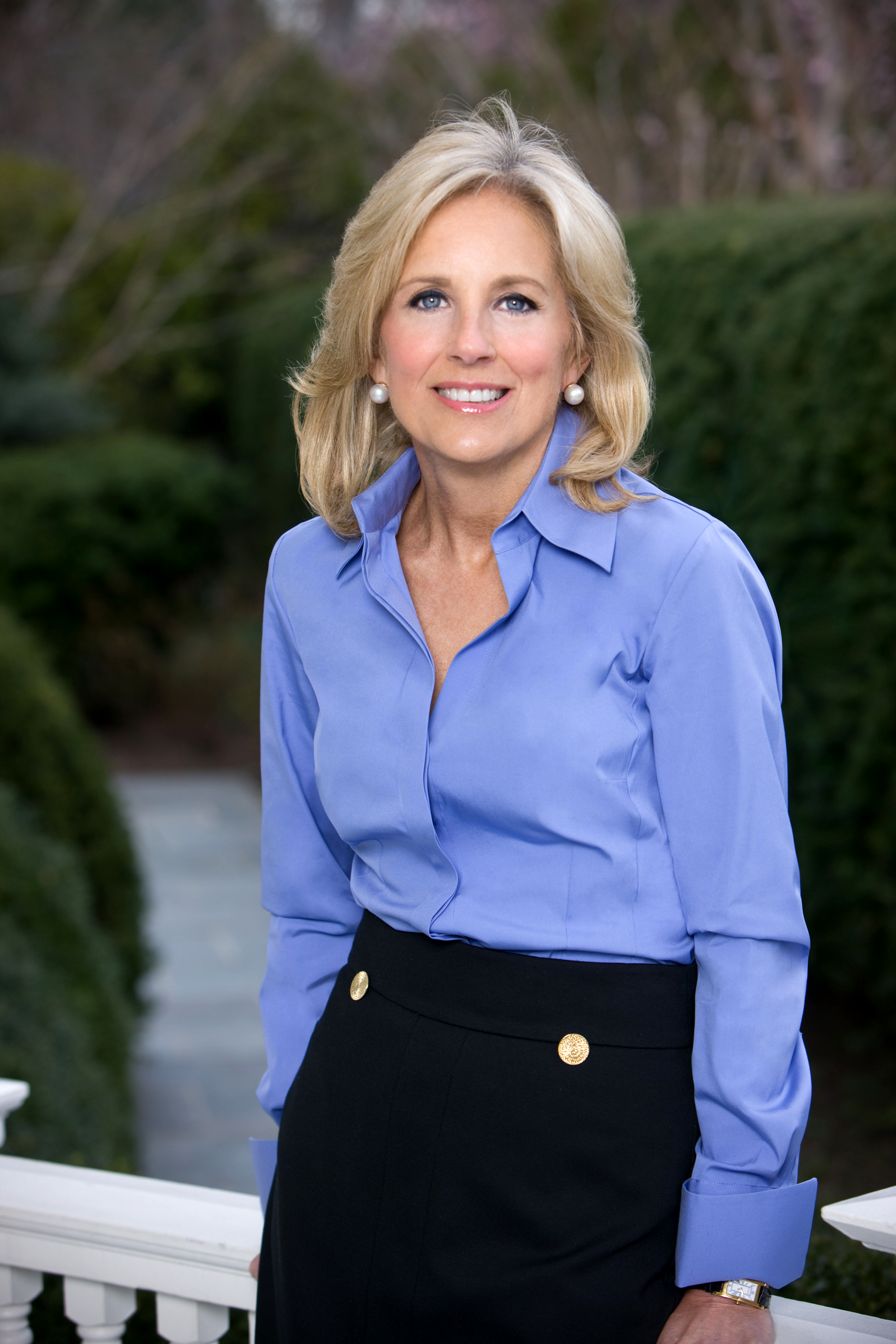
Official portrait for first term, March 2009

Catherine Russell, a former adviser to the Senate Foreign Relations Committee, was named Biden's chief of staff for her role as second lady. Courtney O'Donnell, a former spokesperson for Howard Dean and Elizabeth Edwards, was named her communications director and Kirsten White, a lawyer at Morgan, Lewis & Bockius, her policy director. As Second Lady, Biden had a staff of eight overall and occupied a corner suite in the Eisenhower Executive Office Building.

In May 2009, Obama announced that Biden would be in charge of an initiative to raise awareness about the value of community colleges. Biden continued teaching two English reading and writing classes at NOVA in fall 2009. In January 2010, she gave the commencement speech at the University of Delaware's winter commencement, the first such address by her at a major university. In August 2010, Biden appeared as herself in an episode of Lifetime's Army Wives, making it part of her campaign to raise awareness of military families.

In April 2011, she and Michelle Obama founded a national initiative, Joining Forces, to showcase the needs of U.S. military families. In September 2011, Biden lent her support to USAID's FWD campaign, a push for awareness surrounding the deadly famine, war, and drought affecting more than 13 million people in the Horn of Africa.

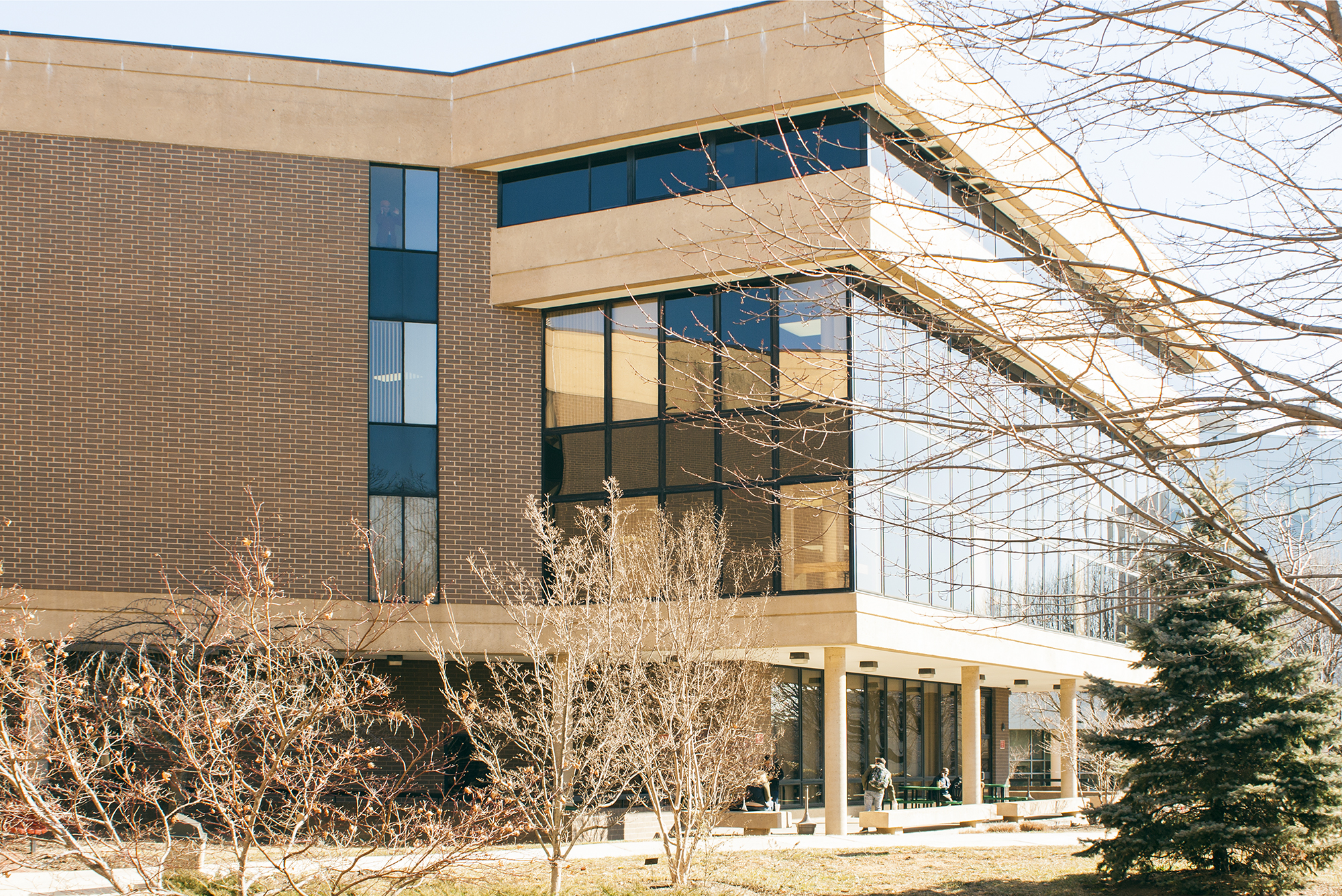
A building on the Alexandria campus of Northern Virginia Community College, where Biden taught between 2009 and 2024

She continued to teach at NOVA; in Fall 2009 she received a two-year appointment as a full-time faculty member, and in Fall 2011 she was given permanent position as an associate professor. In this role she was teaching three English and writing composition courses two days per week. She made her position there as normal as she could, sharing a cubicle with another teacher, holding regular office hours for students, and trying to persuade her accompanying Secret Service agents to dress as unobtrusively as possible. Her students were often unaware of exactly who she was, referring to her simply as "Dr. B." She told a colleague, "My standard line when students ask me if I am married to the VP is to say that I am one of his relatives. That usually quiets them." She was known as a compassionate teacher who engaged with her students' lives, but also one who assigned a lot of homework and was a tough grader. Staffers recall Biden always carrying students' work around with her on trips, and Michelle Obama's recollection of her time traveling with Biden was simply, "Jill is always grading papers."

An examination by The New York Times of her e-mails while second lady concluded that, "she shared the perks of the White House with her teaching colleagues, arranging for tickets to White House events like a garden visit and a holiday tour. But she didn't appear to pull rank; when she needed to take time off work — to attend an event with the Obamas or go on an overseas trip with her husband — she requested permission from the college." In February 2012, she staged a "Community College to Career" bus tour with Secretary of Labor Hilda Solis that aimed to showcase alliances between community colleges and local and regional businesses.

Her life with her husband at Number One Observatory Circle tended towards the informal and was centered around family and their nearby grandchildren. In June 2012, she published a children's book, Don't Forget, God Bless Our Troops, based around her stepson Beau's deployment. The same month, the Bidens' daughter Ashley, a social worker and former staffer at the Delaware Department of Services for Children, Youth, and Their Families, married Howard Krein.

=== Role in 2012 presidential campaign ===
In the 2012 U.S. presidential election, in which her husband was running for re-election as vice president, Biden played a modest role. She did not cut back on her teaching schedule and made few solo campaign appearances. This reflected her continuing distaste both for politics and for public speaking, even though the Obama campaign considered her valuable in connecting to military families, teachers, and women.

=== Second term ===
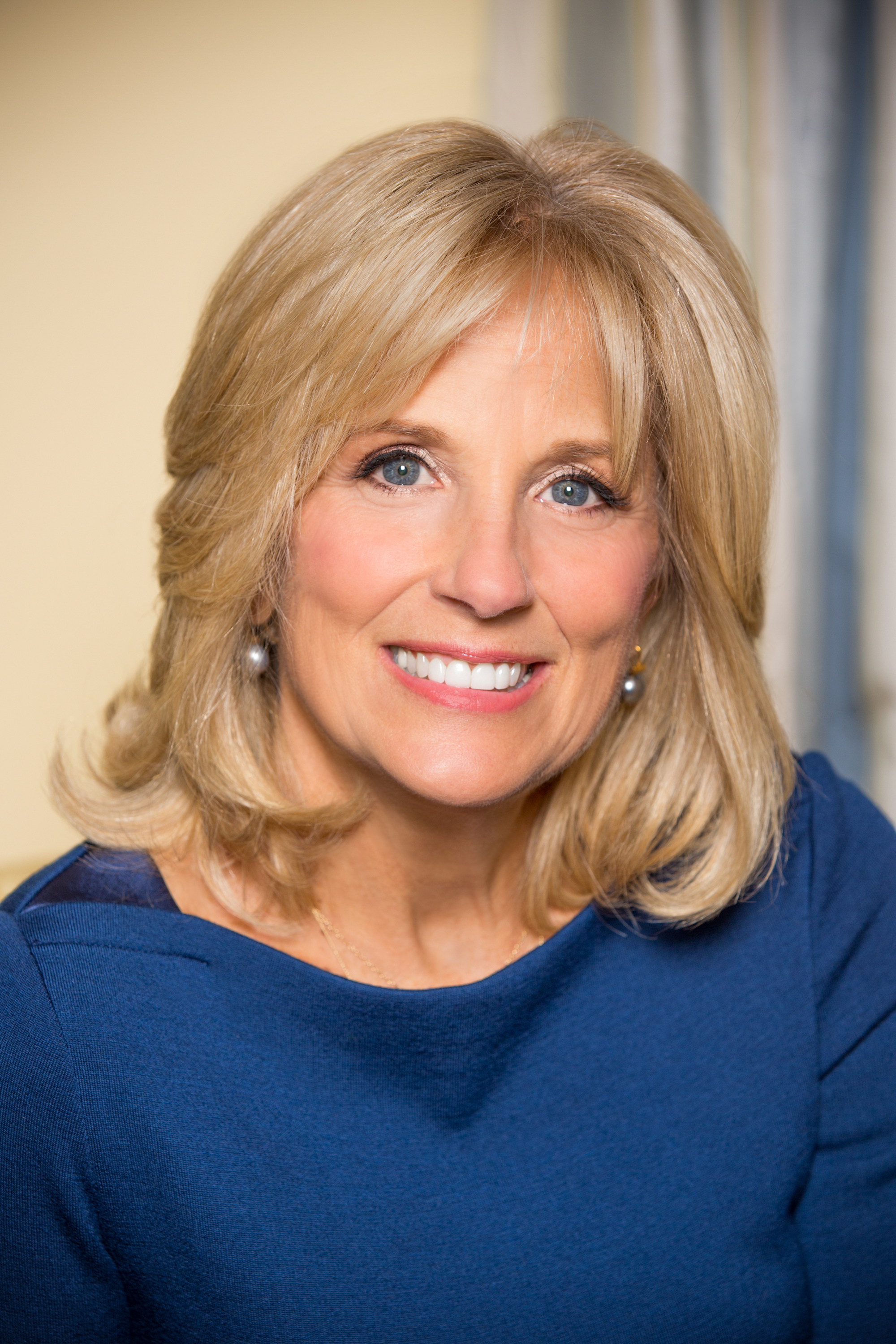
Official portrait for second term, December 2012

Following the re-election of Obama and her husband on November 6, 2012, Biden began a second term (January 2013) as second lady. During her husband's second term, Biden continued to be involved with supporting military personnel, including staging multiple visits to the Center for the Intrepid rehabilitation facility for amputees and attending the inaugural Invictus Games in London. During the 2014 U.S. midterm Congressional elections, she campaigned for a number of Democrats, including some in high-profile contests such as Mark Udall in Colorado and Michelle Nunn in Georgia.

In May 2015, her stepson Beau Biden died from brain cancer. She later described the loss as "totally shattering. My life changed in an instant. All during his illness, I truly believed that he was going to live, up until the moment that he closed his eyes, and I just never gave up hope." She has said that she lost her faith following his death and stopped praying and attending church for four years, but later started to find faith again as a result of campaign trail interactions with people in 2019.

She was present at her husband's side in the Rose Garden on October 21, 2015, when he announced he would not run for the Democratic Party presidential nomination in the 2016 election. By her own account, Biden was disappointed by his decision, believing her husband was highly qualified for the position, and "would have been the best president".

Biden continued to teach at NOVA, handling a full load of five classes during the Fall 2015 semester. During 2016, she was present with her husband on a listening tour for Cancer Moonshot 2020, an effort he was leading. In March 2016, she headed the official party that welcomed American astronaut Scott Kelly back to Earth from his almost full year in space.

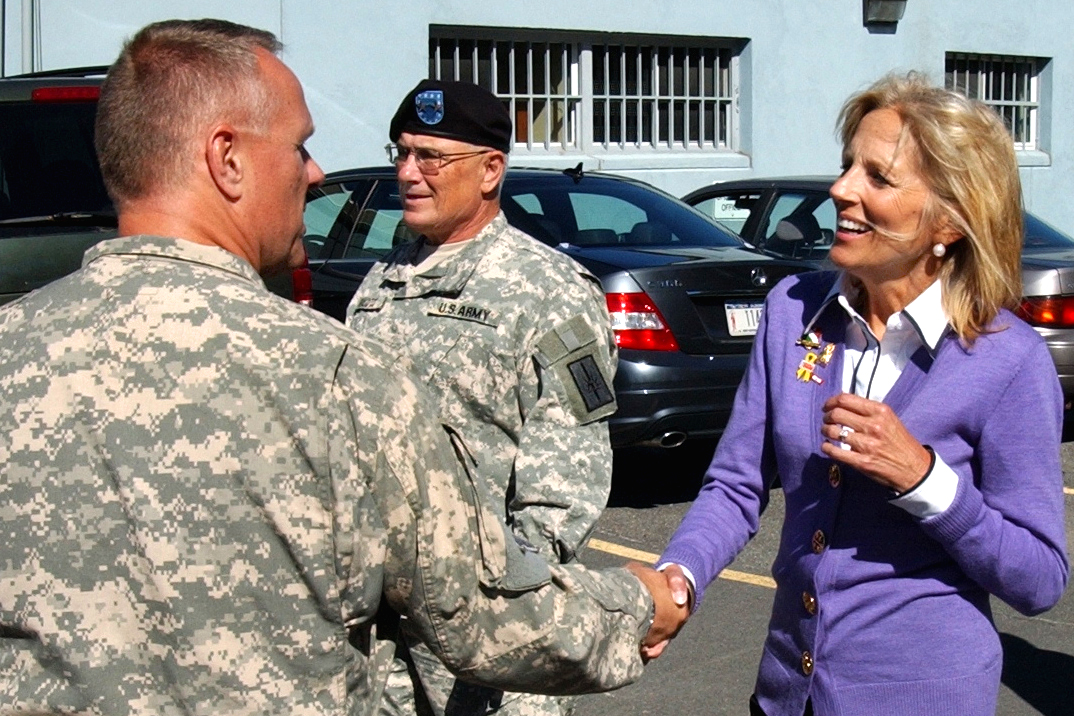
Biden meeting with officers of the New York Army National Guard in 2009

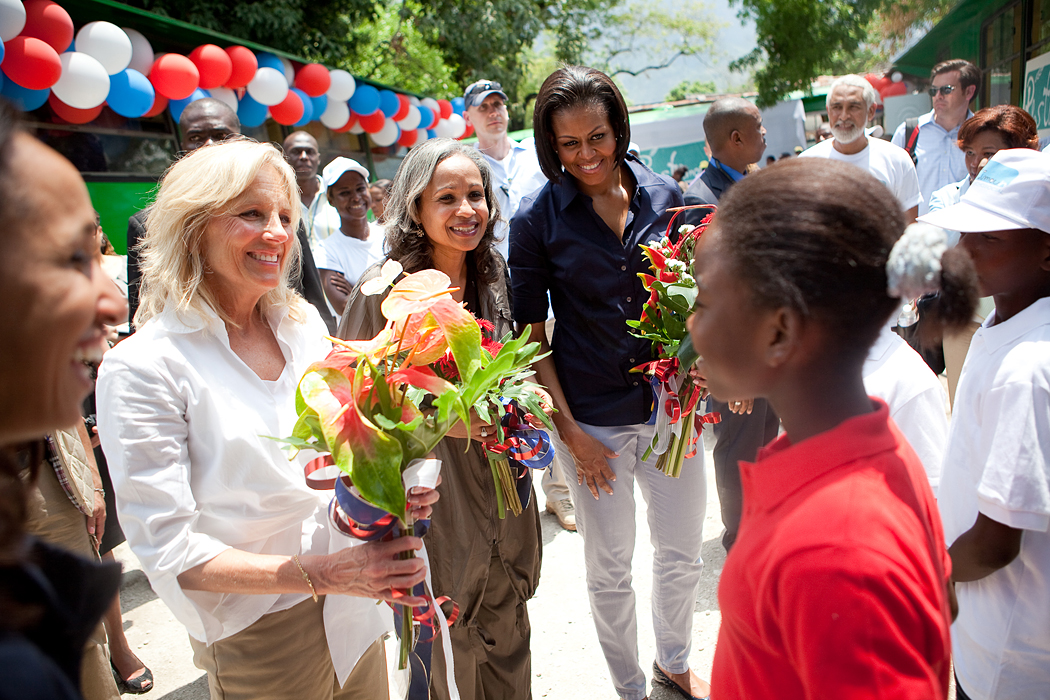
Biden and Michelle Obama accompanying Haitian first lady Elisabeth Delatour Préval in Port-au-Prince, three months after the devastating 2010 Haiti earthquake

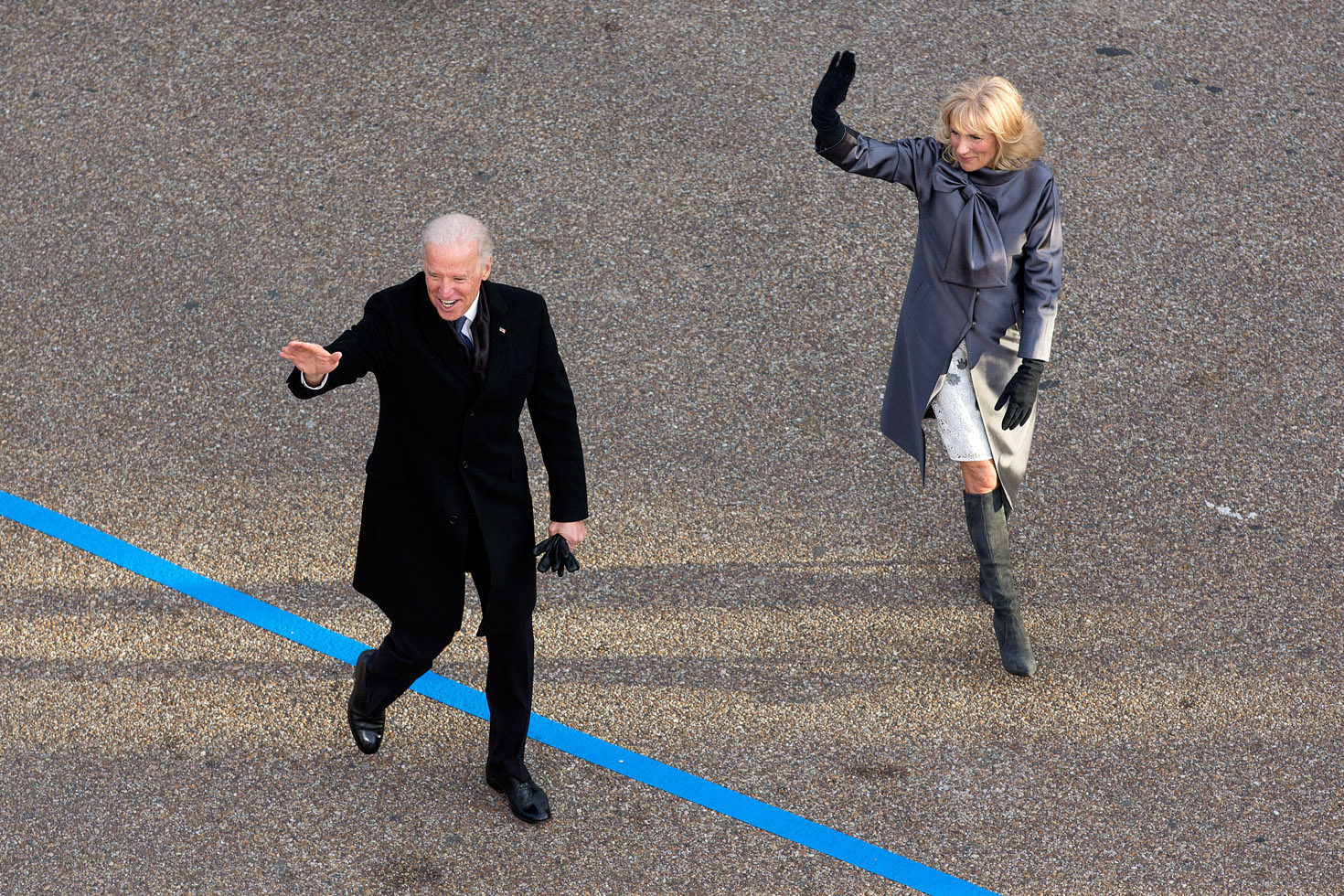
Joe and Jill Biden walking in the inaugural parade along Pennsylvania Avenue in Washington, D.C., on January 21, 2013

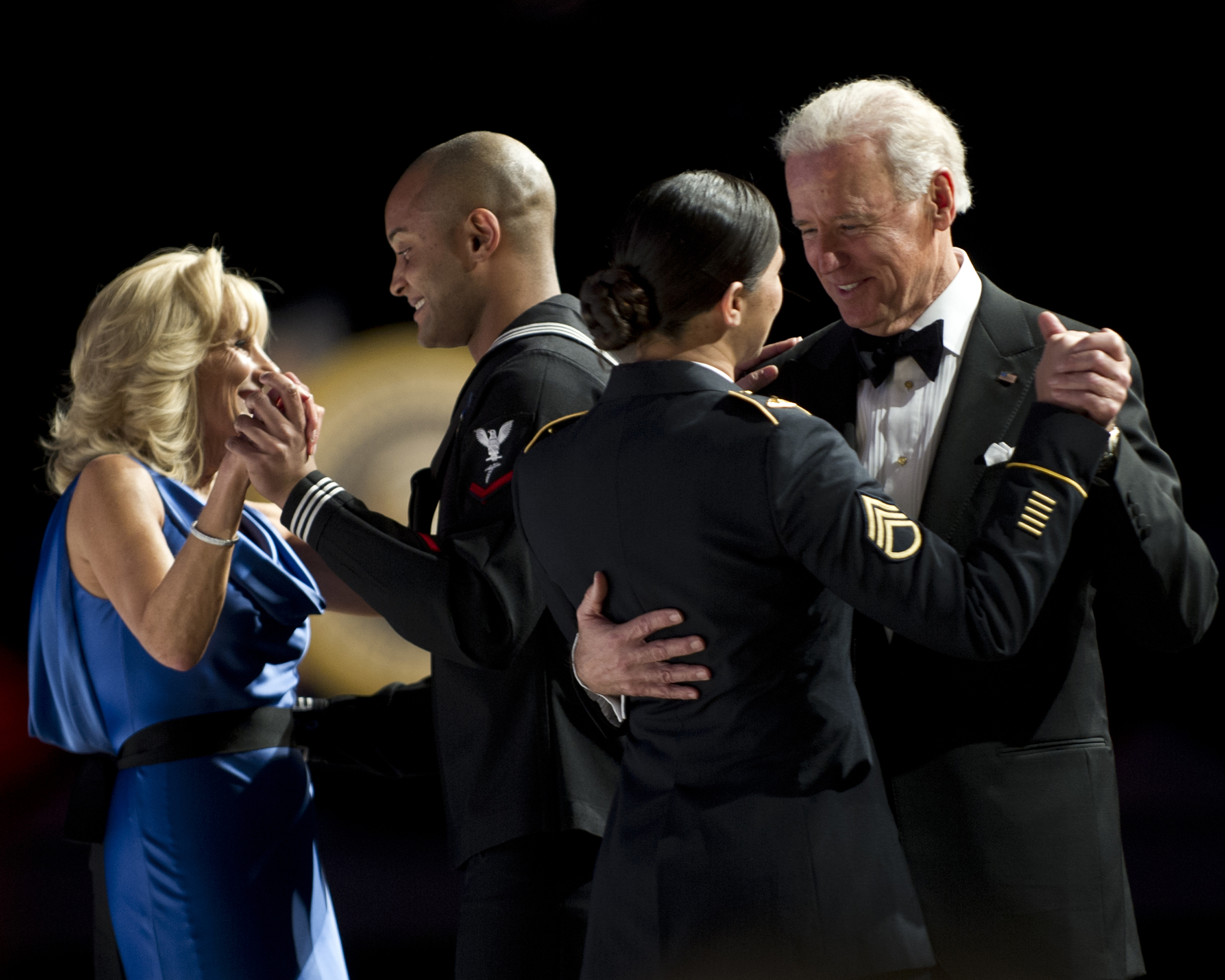
Joe and Jill Biden dancing with members of the U.S. armed forces at the Commander in Chief's Ball. Silk blue gown by Vera Wang.

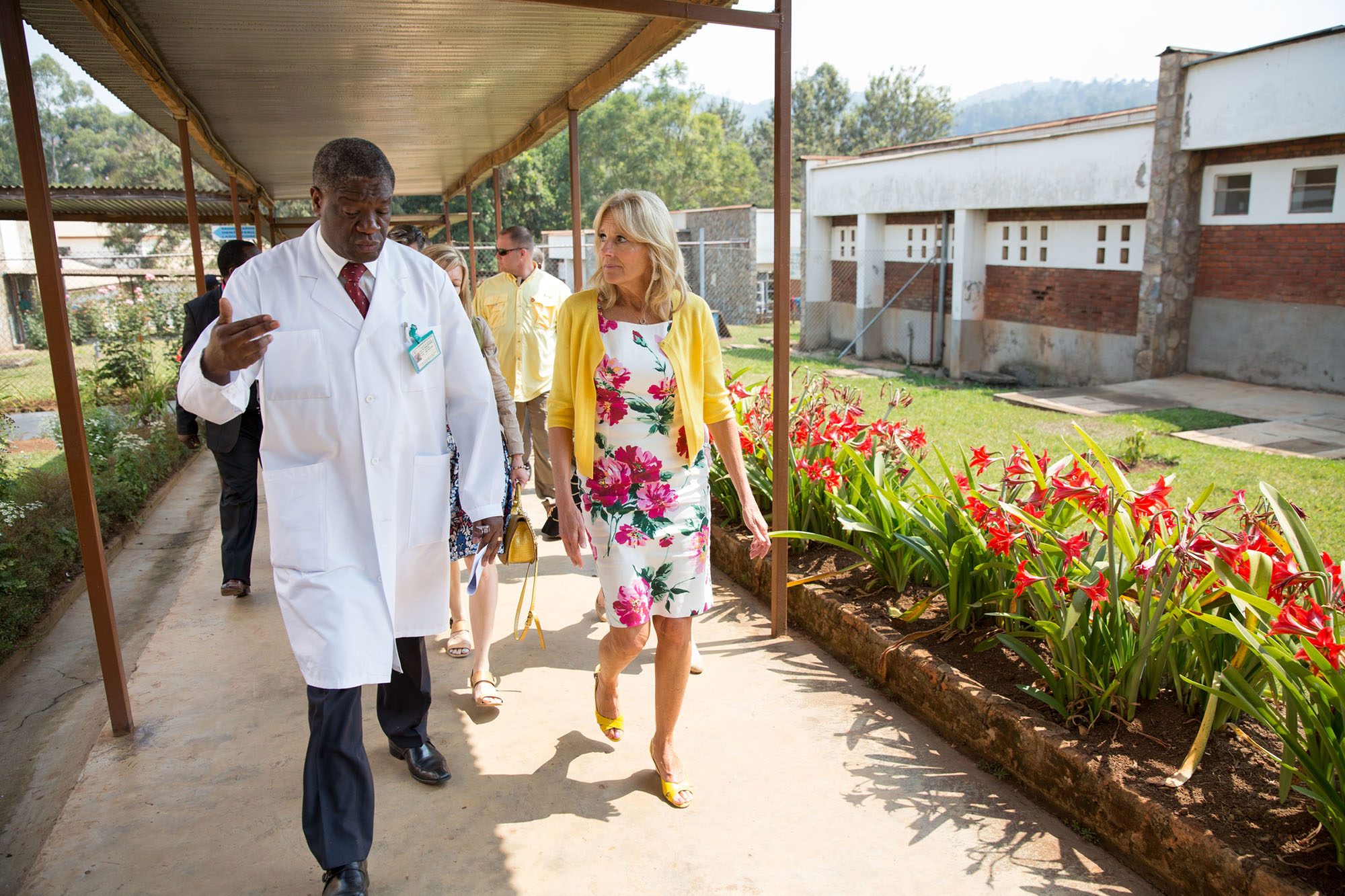
Biden meeting with the Congolese doctor Denis Mukwege in Bukavu in 2014

== Between tenures (2017–2021) ==
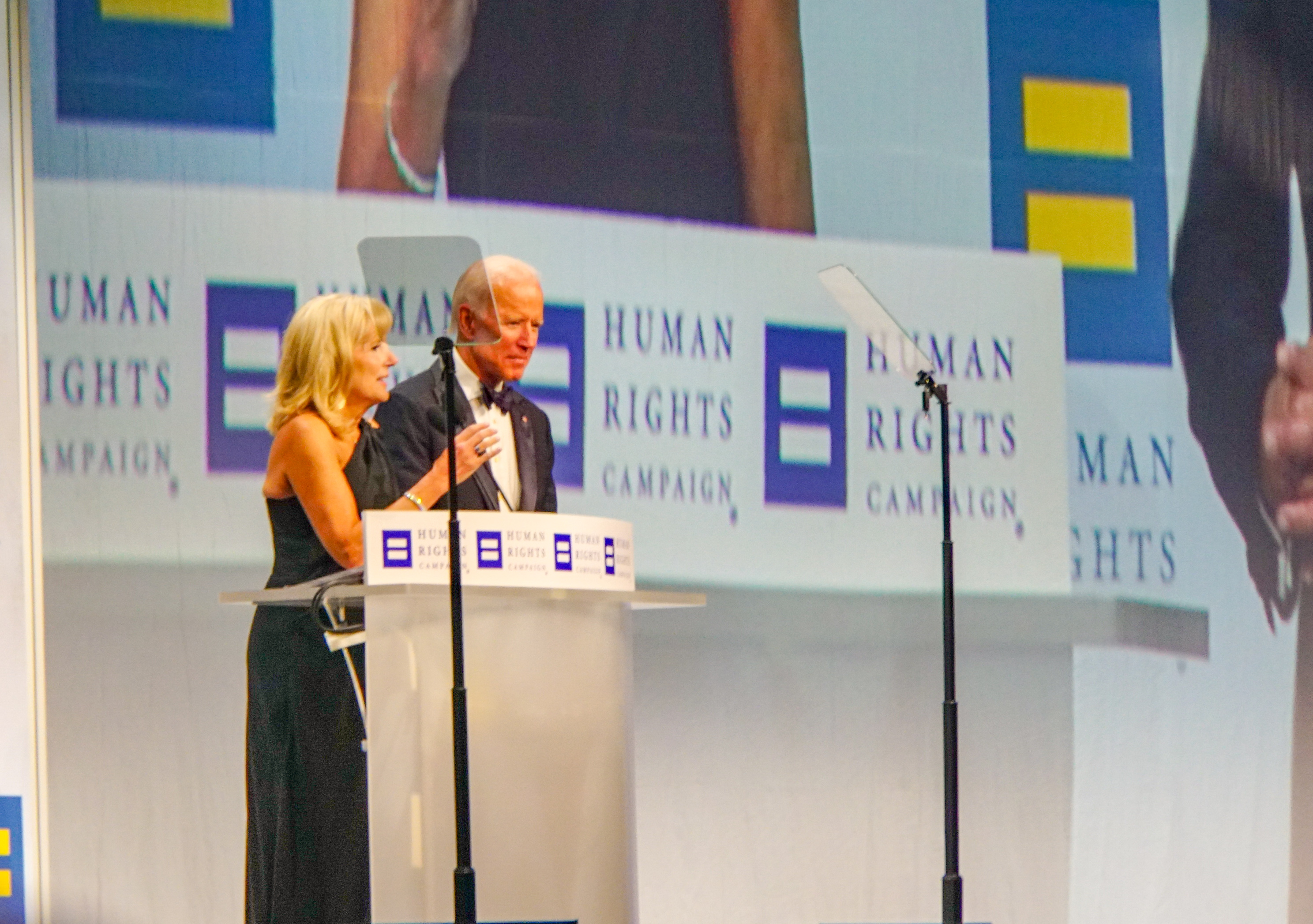
The Bidens at a dinner for the Human Rights Campaign in 2018

The former second couple launched the Biden Foundation in February 2017, with the purpose of allowing them to pursue the causes they cared most about, including focuses upon preventing violence against women, his moonshot initiative, and her interests in community colleges and military families. That same month, she was named board chair of Save the Children; she said, "I think [their] emphasis on education fits with my life's work." Her husband was seen as a popular ex-vice president, and she received a standing ovation when she was a presenter at the 71st Tony Awards.

In June 2017, the couple bought a $2.7 million, off-the-water vacation home in Rehoboth Beach, Delaware, near Cape Henlopen State Park, where they planned to host members of their extended family. Their ability to purchase this family property was due in part to deals they signed with Flatiron Books upon leaving office, with Biden contracted to write one book and her husband two. By 2019, the couple reported some $15 million in income since leaving the vice presidency, including $700,000 in speaking engagements for herself. The couple also substantially increased their charitable giving during this period.

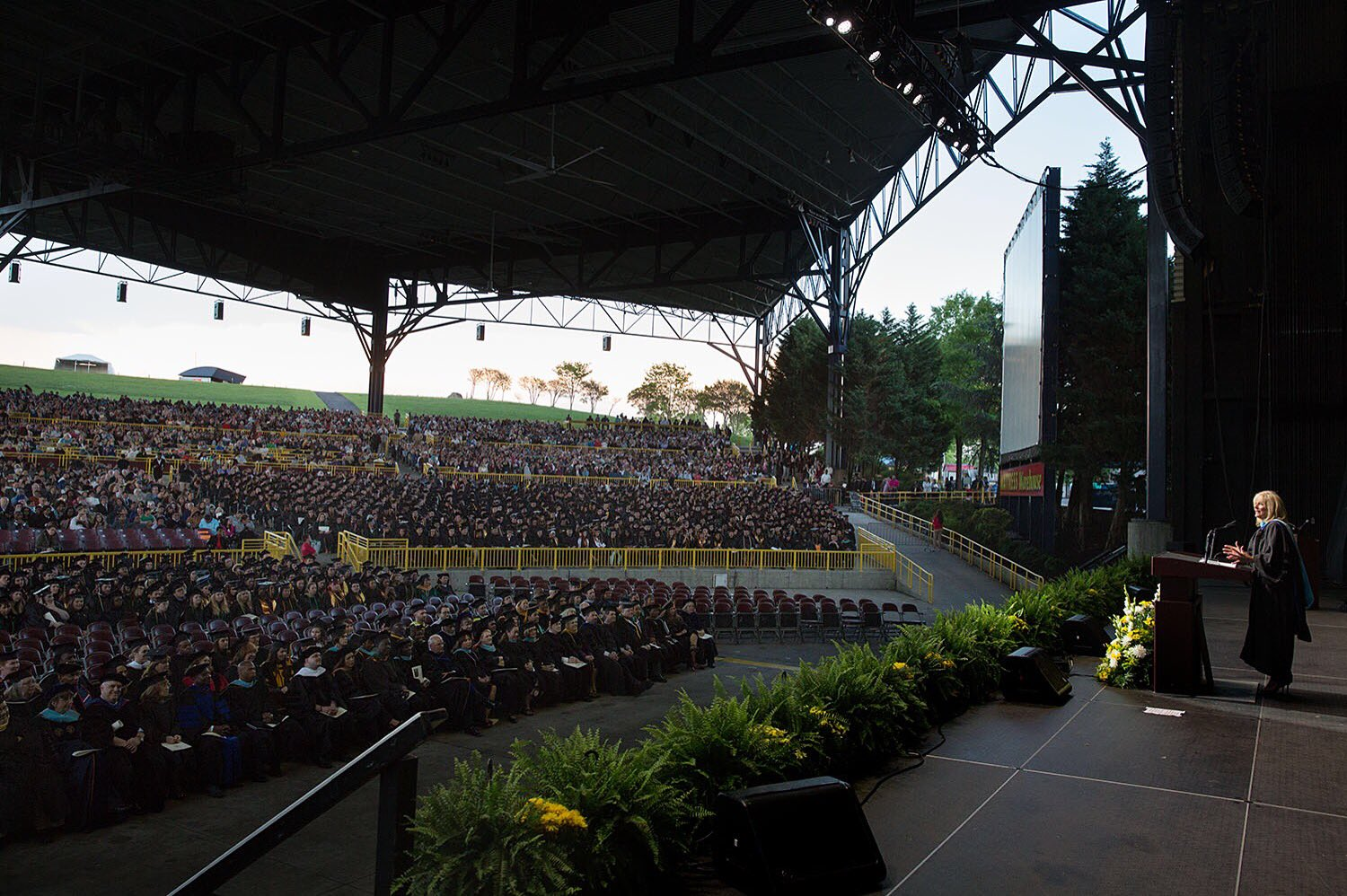
Biden giving a commencement address

Jill Biden continued to teach full-time at NOVA after her husband left office, with a salary of close to $100,000. She was selected to give the keynote address at a commencement for Milwaukee Area Technical College in May 2017. She gave the keynote address at a California teachers summit in July 2017, emphasizing the importance of communities supporting their teachers given the emotional and circumstantial stresses they often have to function under. Then in May 2018, she gave a commencement address at Bishop State Community College in Alabama, telling the graduates that "Maybe like me, life got in the way and it's taken you a lot longer than you expected to get here today. ... Whoever you are, know this, if you can walk across this stage, you can do anything." In February 2019, she spoke to the graduating class of the Newport News Apprentice School, telling them she realized many of them were in complicated life situations with multiple responsibilities, and that "Sometimes your day is a jigsaw puzzle that never seems to get completed. ... But no matter where life takes you, as of today you are a master of a craft, a shipbuilder and a leader, and no one can take that away from you."

In May 2019, her memoir Where the Light Enters: Building a Family, Discovering Myself was published. The book has little political content, instead focusing on aspects of family. In it she says that while she is "grateful" to have been Second Lady, "The role I have always felt most at home in is being 'Dr. B.'" USA Today called it an "often-poignant memoir that charts her journey from a rebellious teen to young divorcee to the second lady of the United States." Biden did some book signings to help promote the work.

== Role in 2020 presidential campaign ==
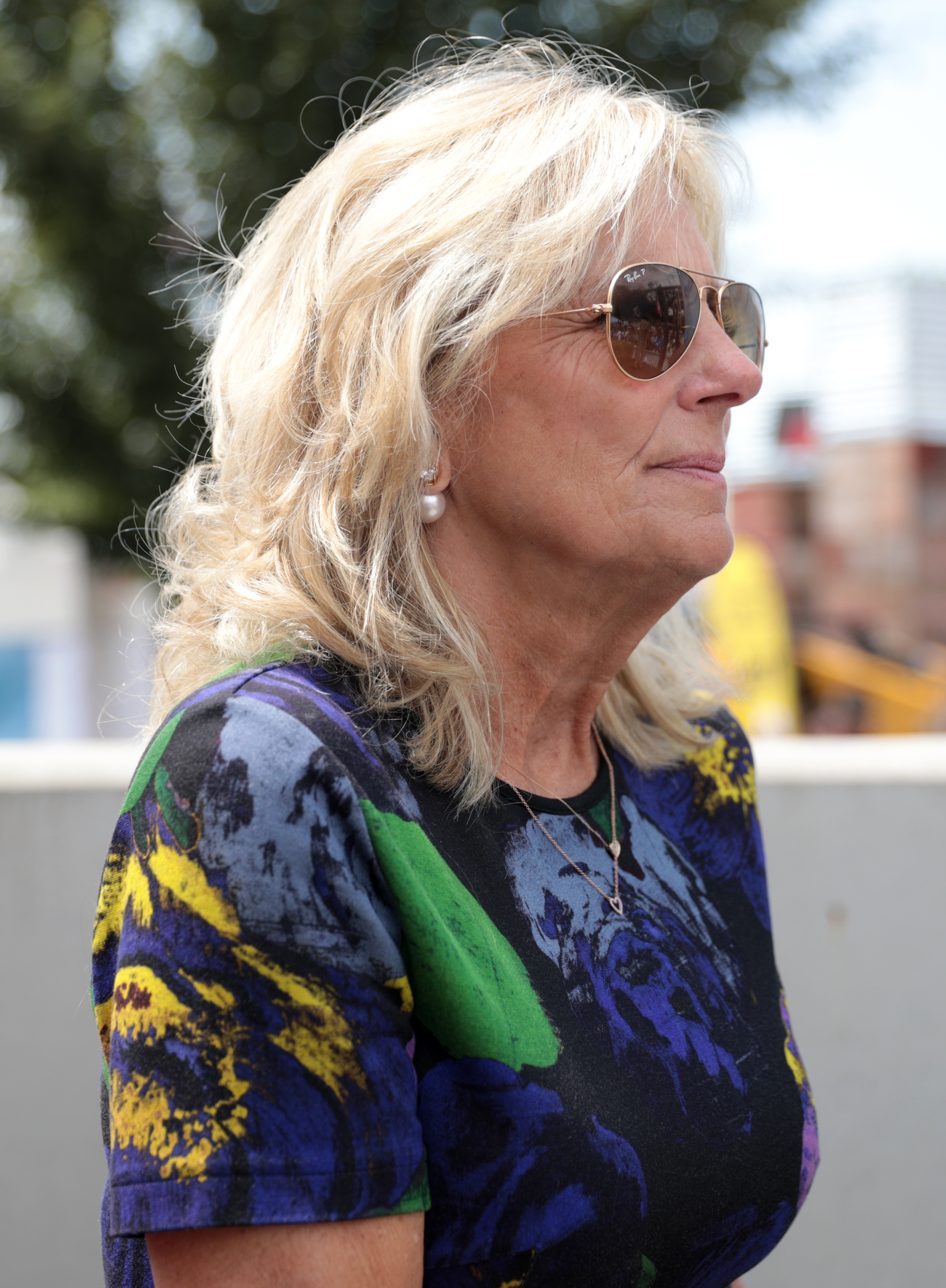
Biden at an August 2019 campaign event

Regarding the much-discussed possibility of her husband running in the 2020 United States presidential election, Biden was a key participant in his decision-making process. By one report in March 2019, she was "enthusiastically" in favor of his running.

The Joe Biden 2020 presidential campaign was officially announced on April 25, 2019. A Town and Country magazine headline declared that "Jill Biden Might Just Be Joe Biden's Greatest Political Asset".

Days later, Biden addressed the matter of women who had accused her husband of physical contact that had made them feel uncomfortable by saying, "I think what you don't realize is how many people approach Joe. Men and women, looking for comfort or empathy. But going forward, I think he's gonna have to judge — be a better judge — of when people approach him, how he's going to react. That he maybe shouldn't approach them." She said she had experienced male intrusion on personal space herself: "I just sorta stepped aside. I didn't address it. ... things have changed. There was a time when women were afraid to speak out. I can remember specifically it was in a job interview ... if that same thing happened today, I'd turn around and say, 'What do you think you're doin'?' ... it's totally different." She also attracted attention by saying "it's time to move on" concerning her husband's role in 1991 regarding Anita Hill and the Clarence Thomas Supreme Court nomination.

Biden continued to teach at NOVA during 2019, at one point telling a reporter, "I'm here grading research papers in between interviews." She staged appearances without her husband in early contest states such as Iowa, in some cases accompanied by a granddaughter. She attracted notice during one campaign stop in New Hampshire when she emphasized the electability argument in favor of her husband, saying, "you know, your candidate might be better on, I don't know, health care, than Joe is, but you've got to look at who's going to win this election, and maybe you have to swallow a little bit and say, 'OK, I personally like so-and-so better,' but your bottom line has to be that we have to beat Trump."

Once Hunter Biden became a Republican political focus during the Trump–Ukraine scandal, she was outspoken: "Hunter did nothing wrong. And that's the bottom line." The strain of the subsequent impeachment trial was enough to fracture a friendship she had with South Carolina senator Lindsey Graham, who repeatedly called for Hunter Biden to be questioned as a witness at the trial.

Biden played a more active role in this presidential campaign than she had in her husband's two prior ones, and for the first time, Biden reluctantly took a leave of absence from NOVA for the spring 2020 semester so she could be on the campaign trail full-time. She took training in online teaching once the COVID-19 pandemic in the United States struck. She indicated that she intended to resume teaching at NOVA even if her husband were to be elected.

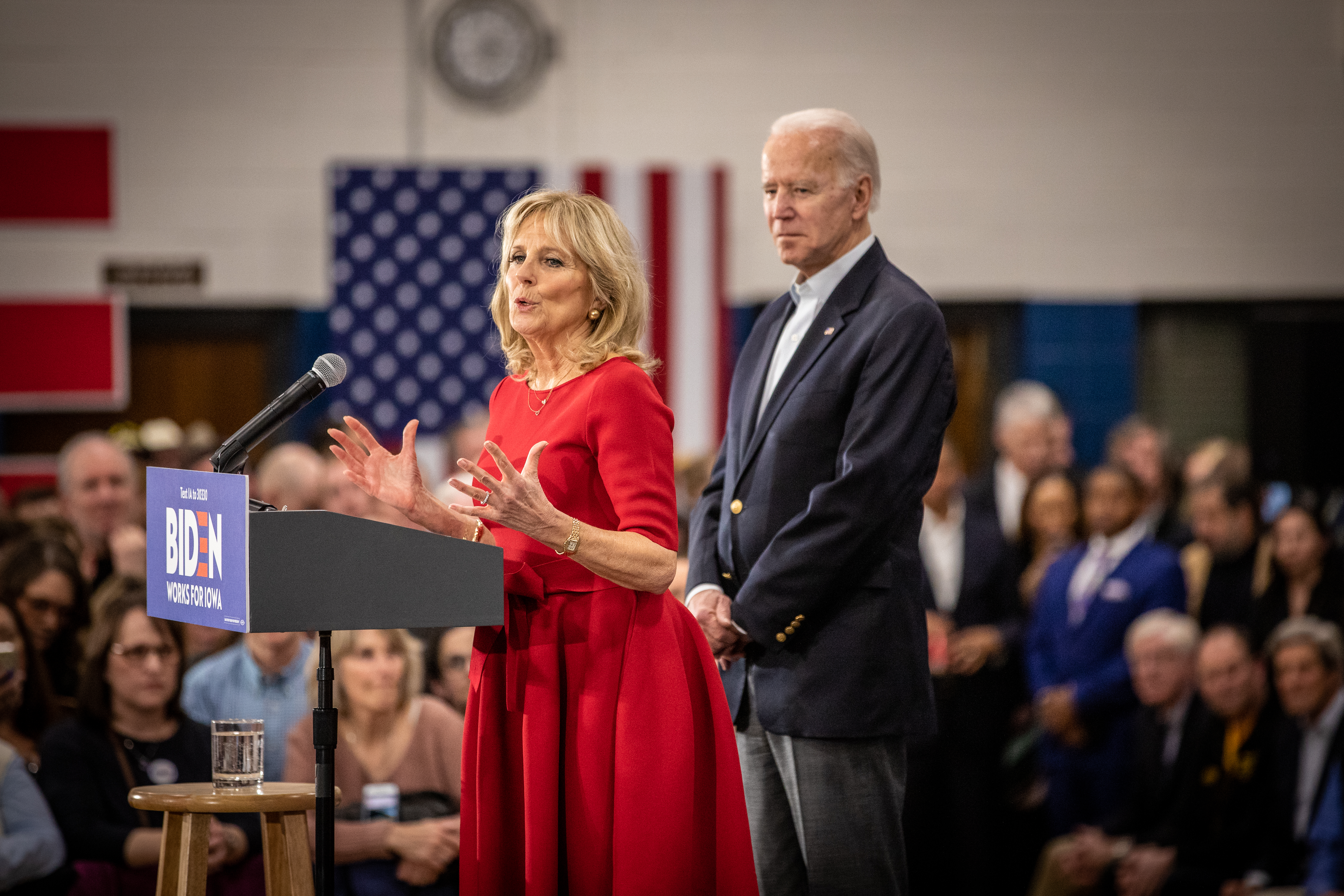
The Bidens in Des Moines on the eve of the February 2020 Iowa caucuses

In the weeks leading up to the Iowa caucuses, she sometimes staged more campaign appearances in that state than her husband did. She gave out her campaign e-mail address to voters in case they wanted to ask her follow-up questions. In joint appearances, she sometimes spoke after he did, acting in the "closer" role. After experiencing a number of victories around the nation, she gained some media attention at the March 3 Super Tuesday primaries during her husband's speech when she physically blocked a protester from getting at him. Asked about the stiff-arm she employed, she said, "I'm a good Philly girl."

With her husband having become the presumptive Democratic nominee, in June 2020, she published the children's book Joey: The Story of Joe Biden, illustrated by Amy June Bates, which portrayed him as having been "brave and adventurous" as a child despite having a stutter he was bullied for. In July 2020, she spoke out about the impact of the COVID-19 pandemic on education, appearing in a video with her husband to emphasize that she understands the frustration with virtual education substitutes: "Schools and parents alike want a clear, science-based strategy, not mixed messages and ultimatums." She criticized U.S. Secretary of Education Betsy DeVos for what she saw as political motivations in advocating a reopening of schools no matter what and said that "the first thing [Joe Biden]'s going to do is pick a secretary of education, who is a public school educator and has experience in the classroom. I mean I hear that, again and again and again — no more Betsy DeVos."

She was heavily involved in the vice-presidential selection process that resulted in Senator Kamala Harris's being chosen. On the second night of the virtual 2020 Democratic National Convention, Biden spoke from the classroom at Brandywine High School, where she had once taught English. She drew parallels between family suffering and the plight of the country, saying, "How do you make a broken family whole? The same way you make a nation whole. With love and understanding and with small acts of kindness, with bravery, with unwavering faith." During the final stretch of the general election, she campaigned in the Philadelphia metropolitan area in Pennsylvania, near her hometown, emphasizing the importance of the swing state and of women voting, saying, "You will decide, you, the women, will decide the future of this state and this state may determine the entire election."

== First Lady of the United States (2021–2025) ==
=== Role and continued teaching ===
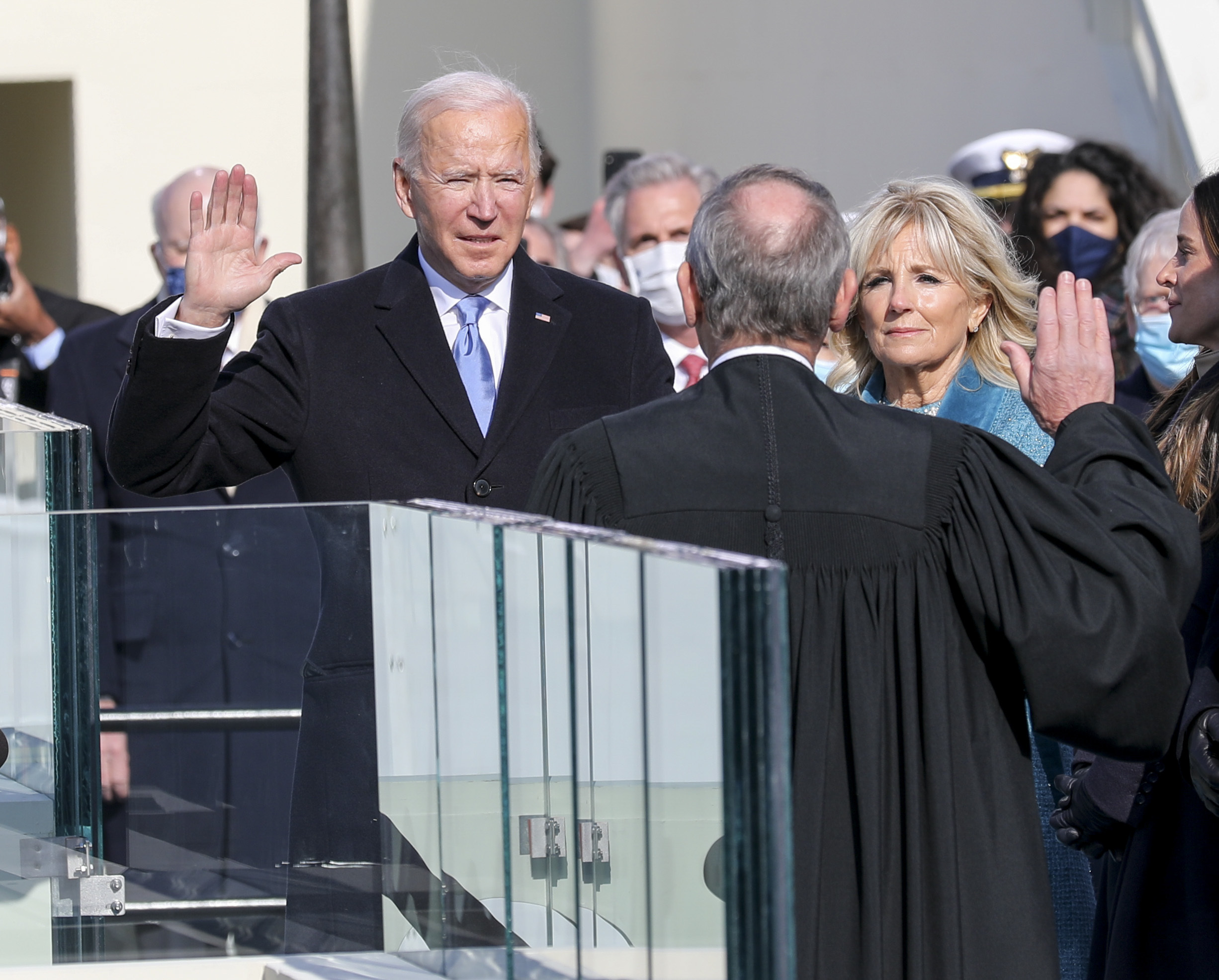
Jill's husband, Joe Biden, is sworn in on January 20, 2021, as Jill looks on.

Biden's husband was elected president and took office on January 20, 2021. She is the first spouse since Barbara Bush to hold the positions of both Second Lady and First Lady and is the first one since Pat Nixon to hold them non-consecutively. At the age of 69, Biden was the oldest first lady to assume the role. She is also the first Italian American first lady. In mid-November 2020, it was announced that her chief of staff as first lady would be attorney and diplomat Julissa Reynoso Pantaleón and that her senior advisor in the role would be campaign staffer Anthony Bernal. In December 2020, an op-ed piece by writer Joseph Epstein in The Wall Street Journal, which urged the incoming First Lady to drop the "Dr." from her preferred form of address because she is not a medical doctor, was met with a widespread backlash, especially among professional women. Outgoing First Lady Melania Trump did not invite incoming First Lady Jill Biden to the White House for tea and a tour, which previously had been a tradition in the presidential transition of power.

She resumed teaching at NOVA, albeit at first on a remote basis over Zoom due to the pandemic. This made her the first wife of a sitting U.S. president to hold a paying job outside the White House, and similarly, the first to continue on with a professional career outside the White House for the majority of her tenure as first lady. For security reasons and for students who are looking to add a class taught by Biden, her classes at NOVA were often been listed as instructed by "staff". She sometimes stayed up late in the White House quarters to review assignments she had given her students. In September 2021 she returned to in-person teaching at NOVA. Her presence there exemplified the Biden administration's desire to get students and teachers back to physical schools; she subsequently said "thank God we all got off Zoom". Security for her classes became tighter than it had been as second lady, with students having to go through a metal detector and initially getting a security briefing. She maintained her reputation as a tough grader who gave a lot of homework.

First ladies are expected to have one or more causes that they advocate for, and Biden's were military families, education, and aspects of health care. The same day might have seen her teaching classes at the college and then flying to an appearance as first lady. Of managing her professional life, her family roles, and her first lady activities all together, Biden said, "You can't do anything in a haphazard way. You have to have purpose while you're doing it, and it has to be organized. That's the key to it."

=== Domestic initiatives and activities ===
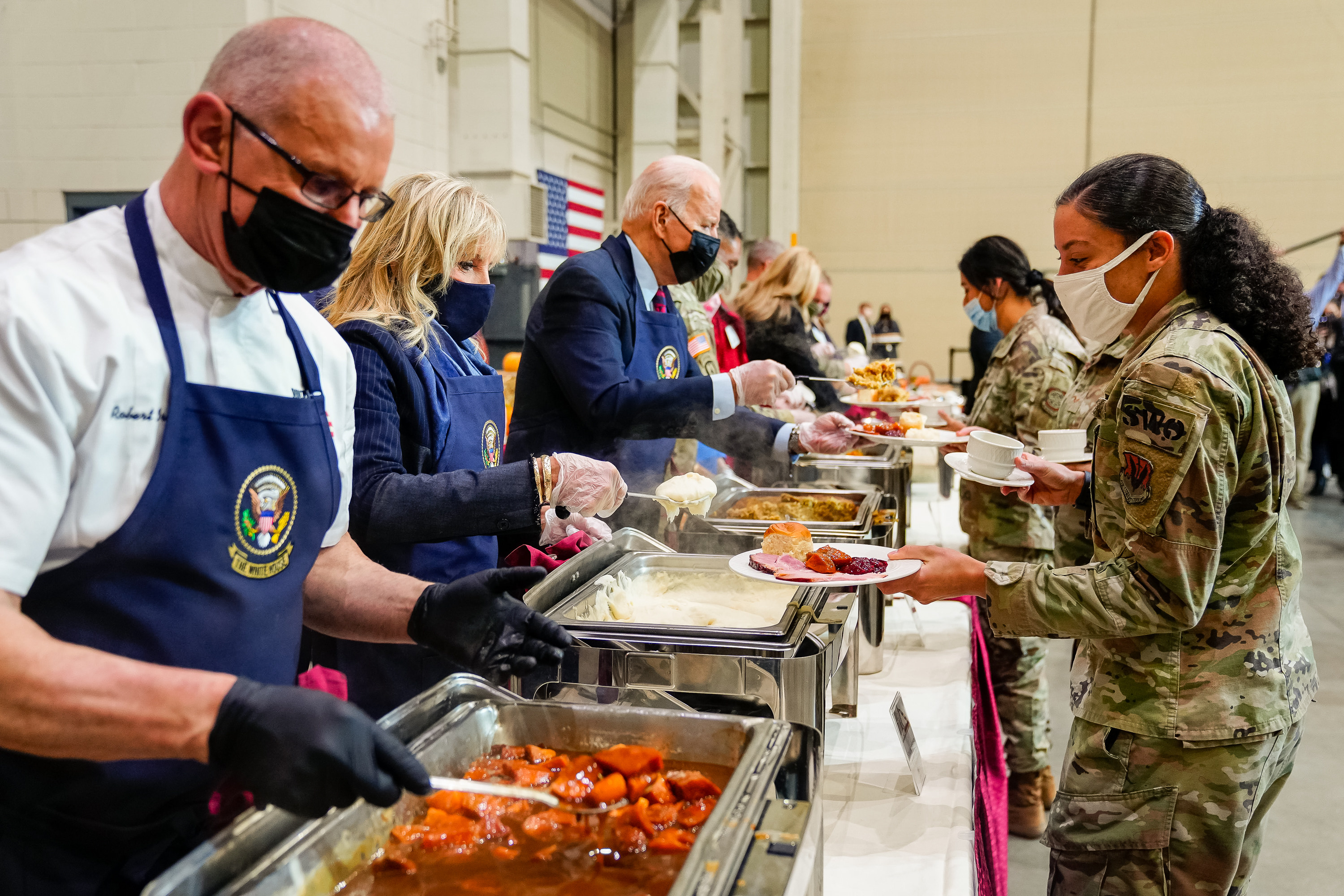
The first lady and president serving a Thanksgiving 2021 meal to service members at Fort Bragg, North Carolina

The Joining Forces program with Michelle Obama, which was put on hiatus by Melania Trump, has been revived by Biden. During visits to Joint Base Lewis–McChord and Naval Air Station Whidbey Island in the state of Washington, Biden said that "the men and women of our armed forces can't be at their best when they are worried that their families are struggling," and praised the joint base for having dedicated spaces for service children on the autistic spectrum. During her tenure, Biden visited 34 military installations and worked with Joining Forces to hold over 70 events for military families focusing on employment, entrepreneurship and other issues. In September 2021, the Office of the First Lady joined the U.S. National Security Council in launching the Joining Forces Interagency Policy Committee to secure proposals across the federal government to support military families. In November 2021, the Joining Forces program joined Elizabeth Dole Foundation and Wounded Warrior Project in launching Hidden Helpers Coalition, an initiative designed to create supportive programming for 2.3 million children of wounded, ill or injured service members or veterans. Hidden Helpers Coalition has partnered with 78 organizations including Children's Hospital Association, Military Officers Association of America and History Channel.

During her husband's first year in office, Biden was put in charge of the public push for legislation that, as part of the American Families Plan, would provide free tuition to students attending community colleges. This proposal, initially estimated at over $100 billion, became part of the large proposed Build Back Better Act (BBB). The BBB social spending initiatives went through a series of negotiations during the year and the bill as a whole struggled to find sufficient support among Democrats in the Senate. Biden continued to advocate for the free community college tuition item and some Democrats in Congress pushed for it too once it became known that it might be eliminated. In a February 2022 appearance before the Community College National Legislative Summit, Biden publicly acknowledged that the free community college tuition item had been dropped from any BBB bill and said that she was "disappointed ... these aren't just bills and budgets to me." (After many further negotiations, a significantly reduced bill passed Congress and became law as the Inflation Reduction Act of 2022, with free tuition for community college one of those provisions that did not make the cut.)

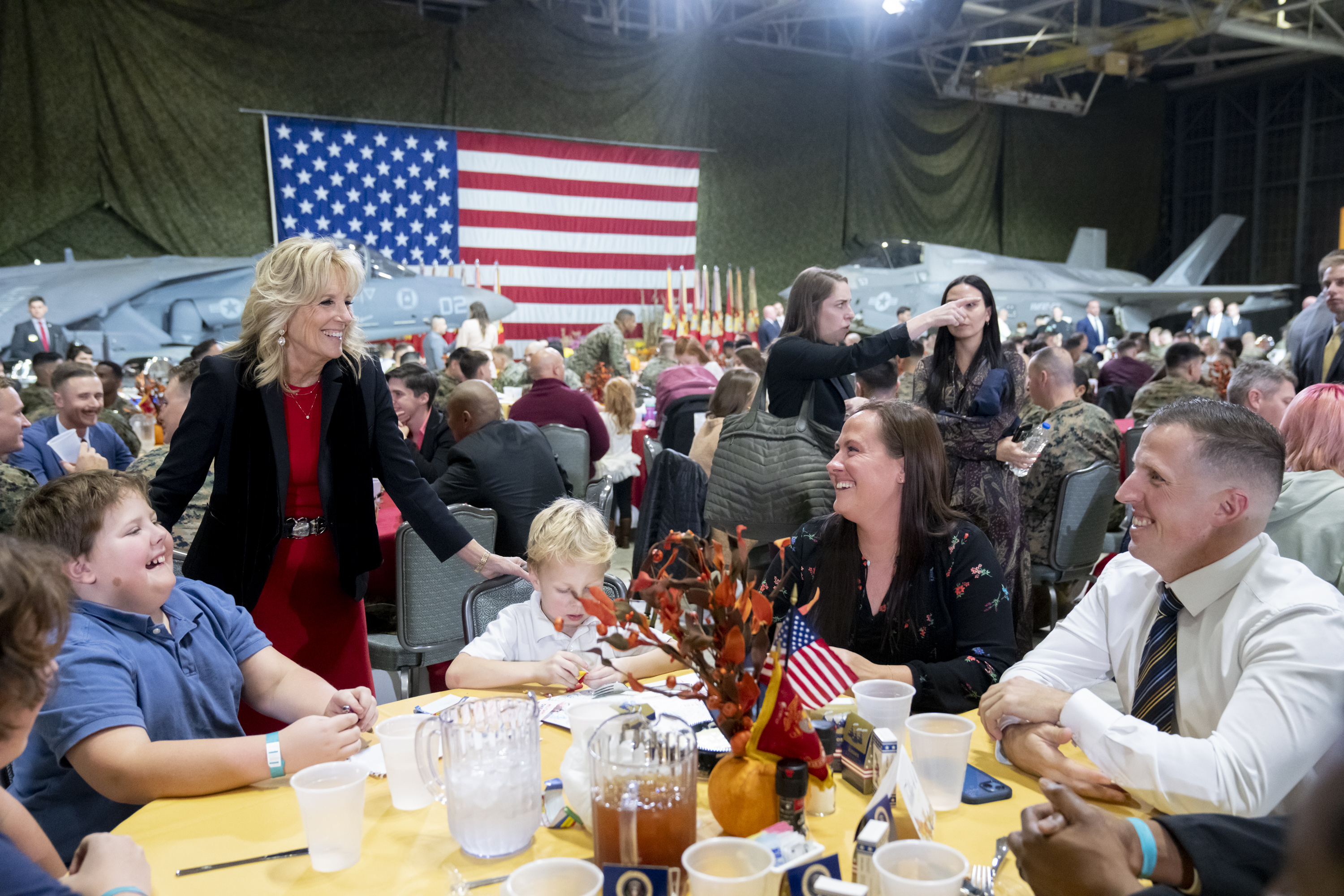
Biden attends a Friendsgiving dinner for service members and families of deployed soldiers at Marine Corps Air Station Cherry Point.

Jill Biden is an advocate for COVID-19 vaccination and toured the United States as a part of President Biden's campaign to vaccinate Americans against COVID-19. Indeed, at times she was the foremost spokesperson in the administration for the vaccination effort; she was sent to parts of the country known for anti-vaccine beliefs and antipathy towards her husband, under the belief that she had a better chance of communicating with people in those areas. Biden, who was fully vaccinated with two booster shots, contracted COVID-19 herself in August 2022 and went into isolation protocols; she subsequently encountered Rebound Covid (as well as contracting Covid again in September 2023). In January 2023, Biden underwent Mohs surgery to remove two basal-cell carcinoma lesions from her face and chest.

Biden is an advocate for women's rights. In March 2023, she hosted a Women's History Month event where she call on men to step up and fight to protect women's rights. Biden, with Secretary of State Antony Blinken, hosted the annual International Women of Courage Award, which were distributed by the U.S. Department of State to acknowledge women "who have demonstrated exceptional courage, strength, and leadership in advocating for peace, justice, human rights, gender equity and equality, and the empowerment of women and girls", at White House. In October 2023, in honor of the International Day of the Girl Child, Biden, along with the White House Gender Policy Council, hosted the first-ever "Girls Leading Change" celebration to recognize the profound impact young women are having on their communities across the United States. In February 2024, Biden announced the White House Initiative on Women's Health Research, a $100 million federal funding for research and development into women's health, which is led by the first lady and the White House Gender Policy Council. The funding comes from the Advanced Research Projects Agency for Health (ARPA-H), which is under the United States Department of Health and Human Services. Biden said in November 2023 that the initiative grew out after a meeting with Maria Shriver, a women's health advocate and former California first lady.

Jill Biden is also more political than previous first ladies. According to a President's advisor, she is "one of the top raisers across the board for us as a party." She supported her husband's decision to pull American troops out of Afghanistan. In October 2021, Biden visited Virginia to deliver "last-minute stump" speeches for the Democratic governor, Terry McAuliffe, in his race against Republican challenger and his successor Glenn Youngkin. In 2022, she organized seven fundraisers for the Democratic National Committee. She described the 2022 overruling of the Roe v. Wade Supreme Court ruling as "unjust and so devastating." She criticized former president Donald Trump and Russian president Vladimir Putin during public events and private Democratic National Committee fundraisers. She also criticized Republican opposition of an assault weapons ban and more spending on climate change. In July 2022, Biden expressed frustration with the challenges her husband has faced as his administration has sought to address a range of issues. In April 2024, The New York Times reported that President Biden told an attendee on a meeting with Muslim community members that the first lady had been urging him to calling for an end to the Gaza war, lamenting the high civilian death toll. She has played a role in the hiring of people within the administration's press personnel and has criticized them when she felt they were not sufficiently protecting her husband's image.

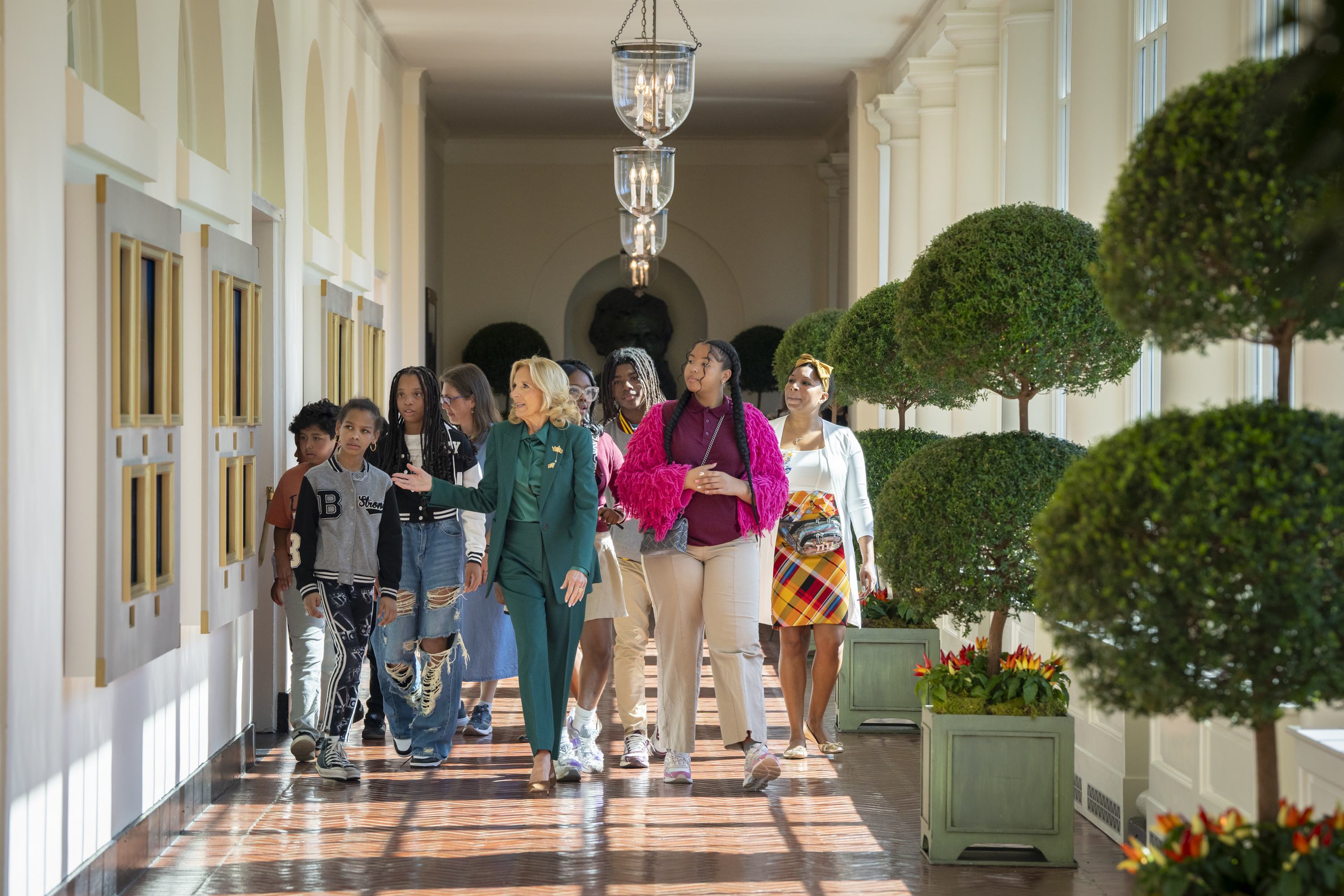
Biden gives a tour of the White House to students in 2024.

Jill Biden initiated an overhaul of the White House public tour to make the tour more accessible, interactive and educational for visitors. She initiated the revamp after learning that the public tour had not seen any significant improvements in decades. In the past, the tour allowed visitors only a quick look at some of the most famous rooms in the White House and emphasized the White House's antiques and artwork. Biden described the old public tour to The Washington Post: "They weren't dynamic." The Office of the First Lady worked on the $5 million project for two years with the National Park Service, the White House Office of the Curator, the White House Historical Association, presidential libraries and the History Channel. In October 2024, Biden unveiled the upgrade of the tour. The new White House public tour featured digital elements, historical context and insights into the lives of previous presidents and their families. The new tour also includes digital displays that commemorate all eras of American history and five new 3D models of the White House that portray the building as it evolved from 1792 to 2024. The tourists also had a greater access to the White House rooms that were previously closed to the public. The tour also accommodates blind tourists. By October 2022, Biden had visited 40 U.S. states as first lady, outpacing the number of states that her husband visited during his presidency.

=== Foreign trips and activities ===
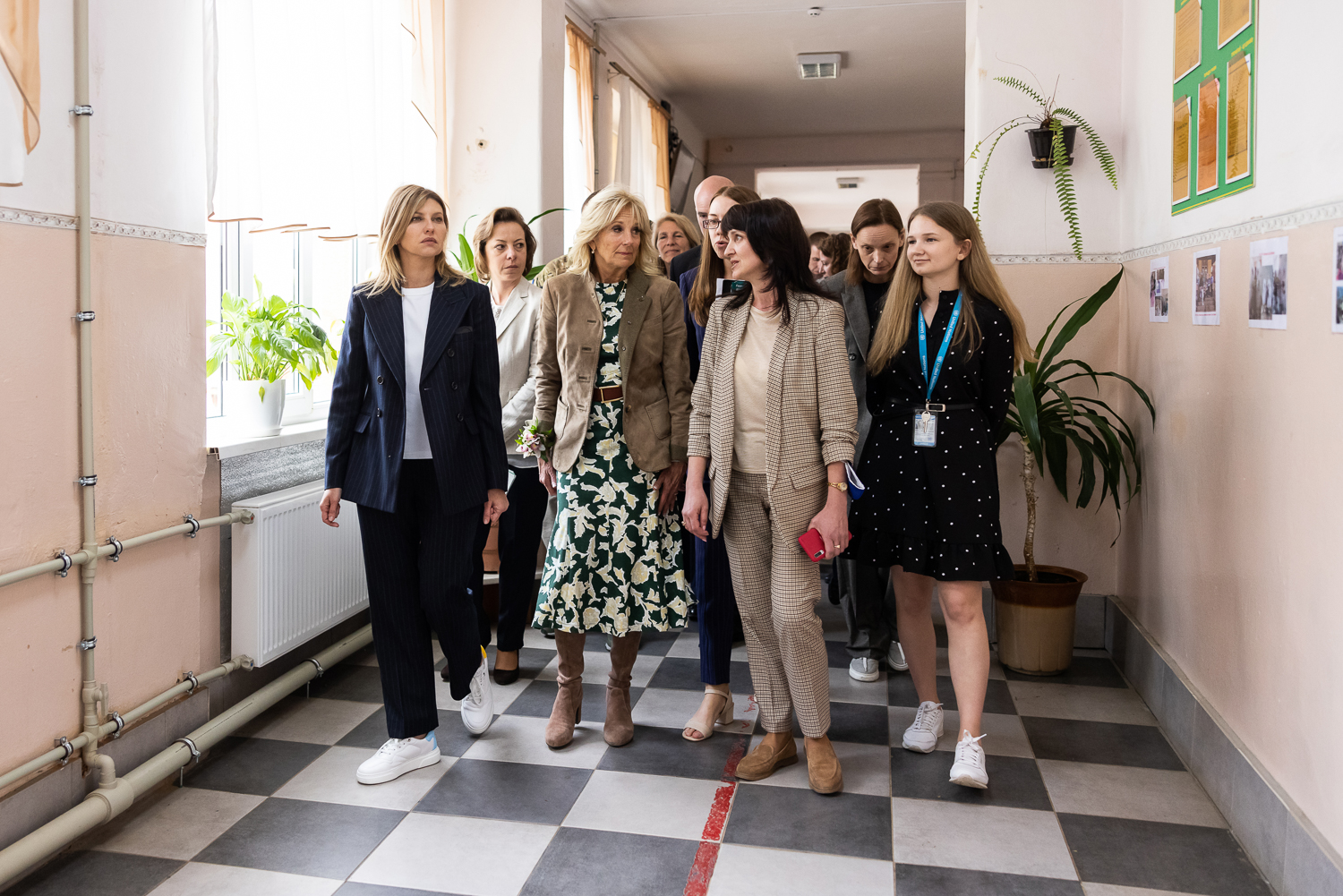
Zelenska and Biden (leftmost pair in front) on their visit together in Ukraine

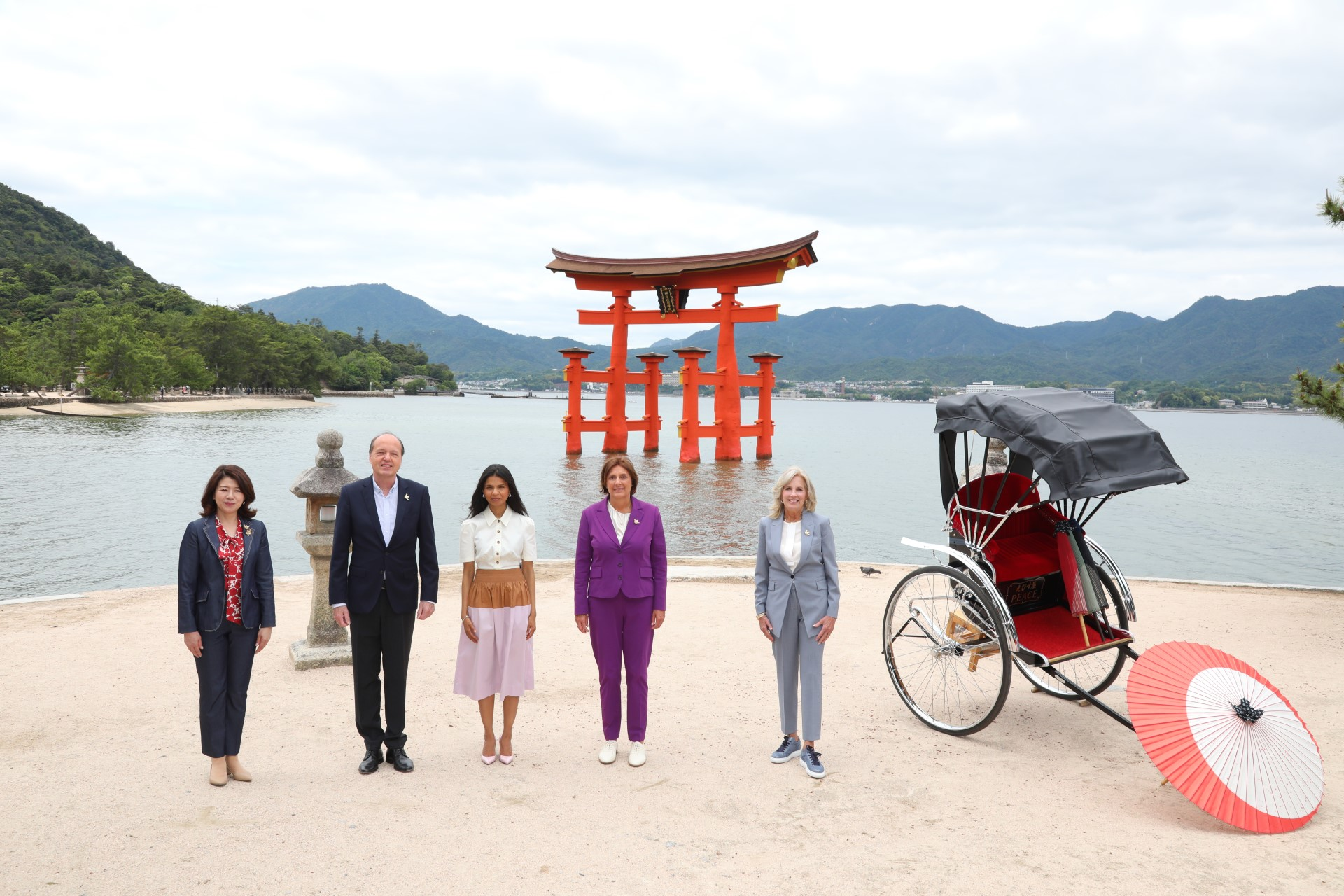
49th G7 summit

In June 2021, Joe and Jill Biden visited Cornwall in the United Kingdom to attend the 47th G7 summit. Biden and the Duchess of Cambridge visited primary school students and participated in a roundtable discussion focusing on early childhood education. The pair penned an op-ed that was published by CNN about early childhood care. In July 2021, Biden visited Tokyo in her first solo trip abroad as the first lady. There, she met Japanese Prime Minister Yoshihide Suga with his wife Mariko Suga at Akasaka Palace and met Emperor Naruhito at Tokyo Imperial Palace. She also visited American athletes at the 2020 Summer Olympic Games and attended the Olympics opening ceremony at the Olympic Stadium. In October 2021, the Bidens visited Vatican City. There, the couple met Pope Francis at the Apostolic Palace to discuss world poverty and climate change. In the same month, the couple visited Rome to attend the G20 Leaders' Summit. Biden met Serena Cappello, wife of Italian Prime Minister Mario Draghi at Chigi Palace and Brigitte Macron, wife of French President Emmanuel Macron at Il Marchese restaurant. She also visited the families of American troops in Naples.

In May 2022, during the 2022 Russian invasion of Ukraine, Biden made a trip (without her husband) to Romania and Slovakia, visiting with Ukrainian women and children refugees and asking questions of workers from aid organizations. During this, she made an unannounced trip across the Slovakia–Ukraine border to Uzhhorod, Ukraine, where she met with displaced Ukrainian schoolchildren, as well as with Ukrainian first lady Olena Zelenska. The visit coincided with Mother's Day as celebrated in the U.S., and Biden said, "I wanted to come on Mother's Day. We thought it was important to show the Ukrainian people that this war has to stop, and this war has been brutal, and that the people of the United States stand with the people of Ukraine." It was the first visit to a war zone by a U.S. first lady without her husband since Laura Bush went to Afghanistan in 2008, and it was the first appearance in public for Zelenska since the invasion started. At a subsequent NATO summit, Biden and several other first ladies emphasized a commitment to helping Ukrainian refugees. In the same month, Biden visited Ecuador, Panama, and Costa Rica. At each stop, she engaged in public appearances and diplomatic discussions that emphasized the value that partnership with the United States brought in by addressing a variety of issues within those countries.

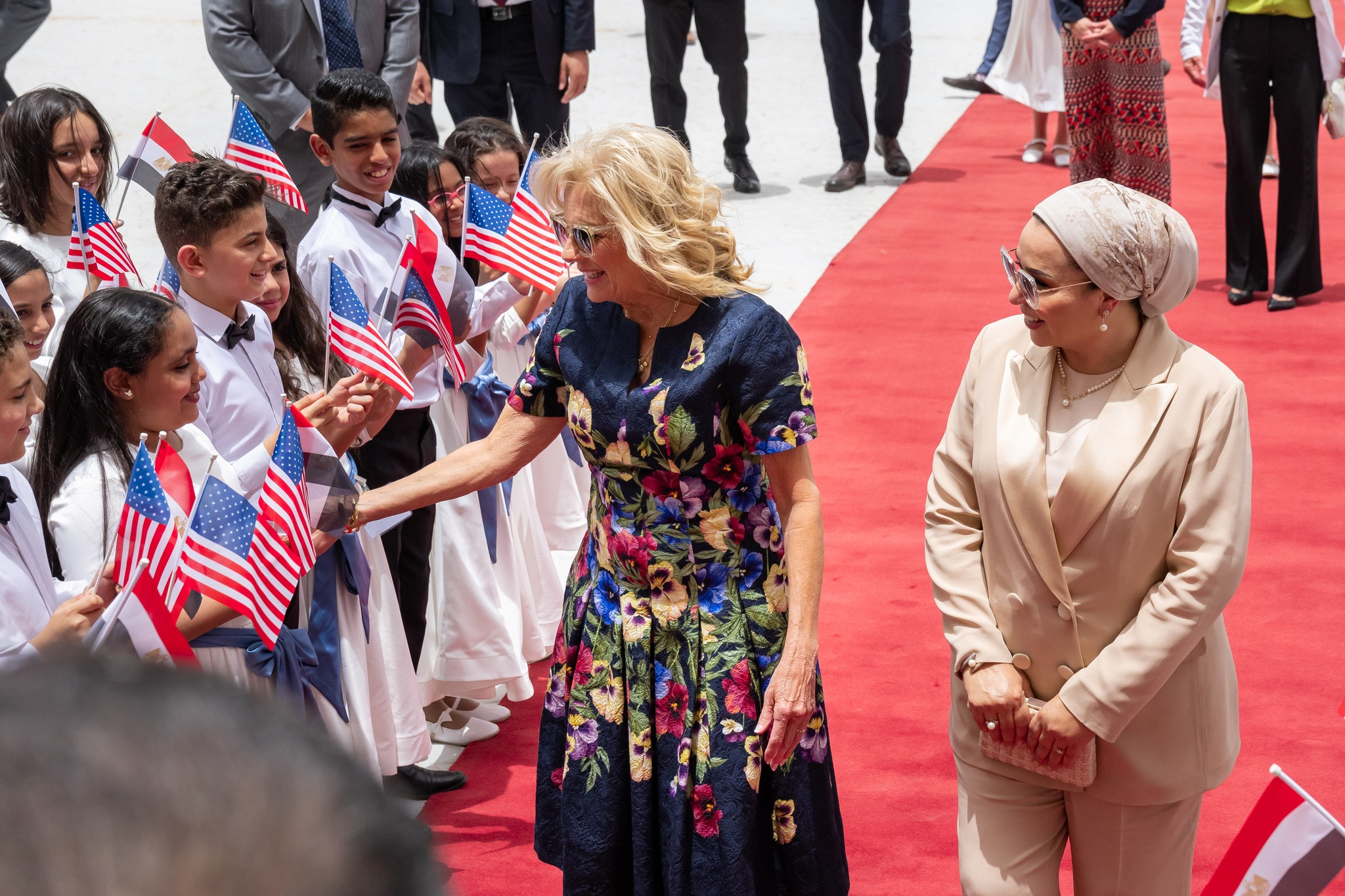
Biden with First Lady of Egypt Entissar Amer in Cairo, Egypt, July 2023

While Biden had visited the continent of Africa five times as second lady, her initial visit there as first lady came in February 2023 with a trip to Namibia and Kenya. In Windhoek, she delivered a speech on democracy and women's empowerment. While in Kenya's Kajiado County, she witnessed the effects of the ongoing 2020–2023 Horn of Africa Drought. In May 2023, Biden and her step-granddaughter, Finnegan, were the representatives of the American government at the coronation of Charles III and Camilla, making it the first time that a first lady had attended a British coronation. In June 2023, Biden and her daughter Ashley attended the wedding of Crown Prince Hussein of Jordan and Rajwa Al Saif. In the same month, she visited Egypt, Morocco and Portugal to highlight her advocacy for youth empowerment and arts. In July 2023, Biden visited Paris to give a speech to mark the official return of the United States to UNESCO.

In July 2024, Biden led the American delegation at the opening ceremony of the 2024 Summer Olympic Games in Paris, France. She also visited American athletes at an Olympic training center in Paris. In October 2024, she led the American delegation to the inauguration of Claudia Sheinbaum as president of Mexico. In December 2024, Biden conducted her final foreign trip as the first lady, visiting Italy, United Arab Emirates, Qatar and France. In Italy, she visited US military personnel in Catania to delivering remarks on behalf of the Joining Forces program. She also visited her paternal family's ancestral hometown of Gesso, Messina. In the United Arab Emirates, she toured the Cleveland Clinic Abu Dhabi as part of the Biden Cancer Moonshot program and attended the Milken Institute's Middle East and Africa Summit. She also met Sheikha Fatima bint Mubarak Al Ketbi, mother of the UAE president Sheikh Mohamed bin Zayed Al Nahyan in Abu Dhabi. In Qatar, Biden visited to the Qatar Foundation and Weill Cornell Medicine-Qatar to highlight the two countries' interests in education and health. She also attended a dinner banquet hosted by Sheikha Moza bint Nasser Al-Missned to celebrate the wedding of Sheikh Khalifa bin Hamad Al Thani and Sheikha Fatima bin Nasser bin Hassan Al Thani at the Al-Wajba Palace in Doha. Biden was the keynote speaker at the 2024 Doha Forum. After visiting Qatar, Biden and her daughter Ashley attended the reopening ceremony of the Notre-Dame Cathedral in Paris.

=== Approval ratings and perception ===
In October 2021, Biden was placed the seventh most popular first lady out of twelve recent first ladies from an online survey poll by Zogby Analytics. During the first year and a half of being first lady, a CNN poll revealed that Biden's favorability ratings had declined, from 58 percent favorable to 28 percentage unfavorable at the time of her husband's inauguration, compared to 34 percent favorable to 29 percent unfavorable during June–July 2022. A popularity dip of that extext was unusual, as first ladies usually have stronger ratings than their husbands do and stay high even when their husbands' ratings decline. The decline has been attributed to Biden being more outwardly political than previous first ladies; to the general increase of partisan polarization in the United States dragging down everyone associated with an unpopular president; and, because of a large number of respondents shifting their views to "no opinion", an artifact of how the CNN poll was conducted. The poll also showed that Biden is still more popular among Republicans than both the president and vice president. As Biden's time as First Lady came to an end in January 2025, a CNN poll showed her with a 33 percent favorability rating and a 31 percent unfavorability rating with 35 percent unsure how they feel about her.

Biden has been noted for having superior message discipline compared to her husband and has rarely produced gaffes. However, one did occur at the July 2022 conference of Latino advocacy organization UnidosUS, when Biden claimed Latino Americans were as "unique" as tacos. She also mispronounced the word "bodegas". Her Latino stereotyping caused widespread condemnation, including from the National Association of Hispanic Journalists, who issued a statement which said "We are not tacos." Biden apologized via a spokesman. The combination of a polling decline and the gaffe was noted as unfortunate timing for the White House and the Democratic Party, who were working to win back Hispanic voters who had drifted to the Republican Party, prior the 2022 midterm elections. In any case, Biden's use in such roles was not diminished, as she became the most requested surrogate of anyone in the Biden administration (including her husband) during fall 2022 campaigns and often was utilized in Republican-leaning areas. Her ability to reach suburban women was especially desired. In all she participated in about 40 speaking appearances or fundraisers for various candidates and as the year 2022 closed, she was suffering from exhaustion and laryngitis.

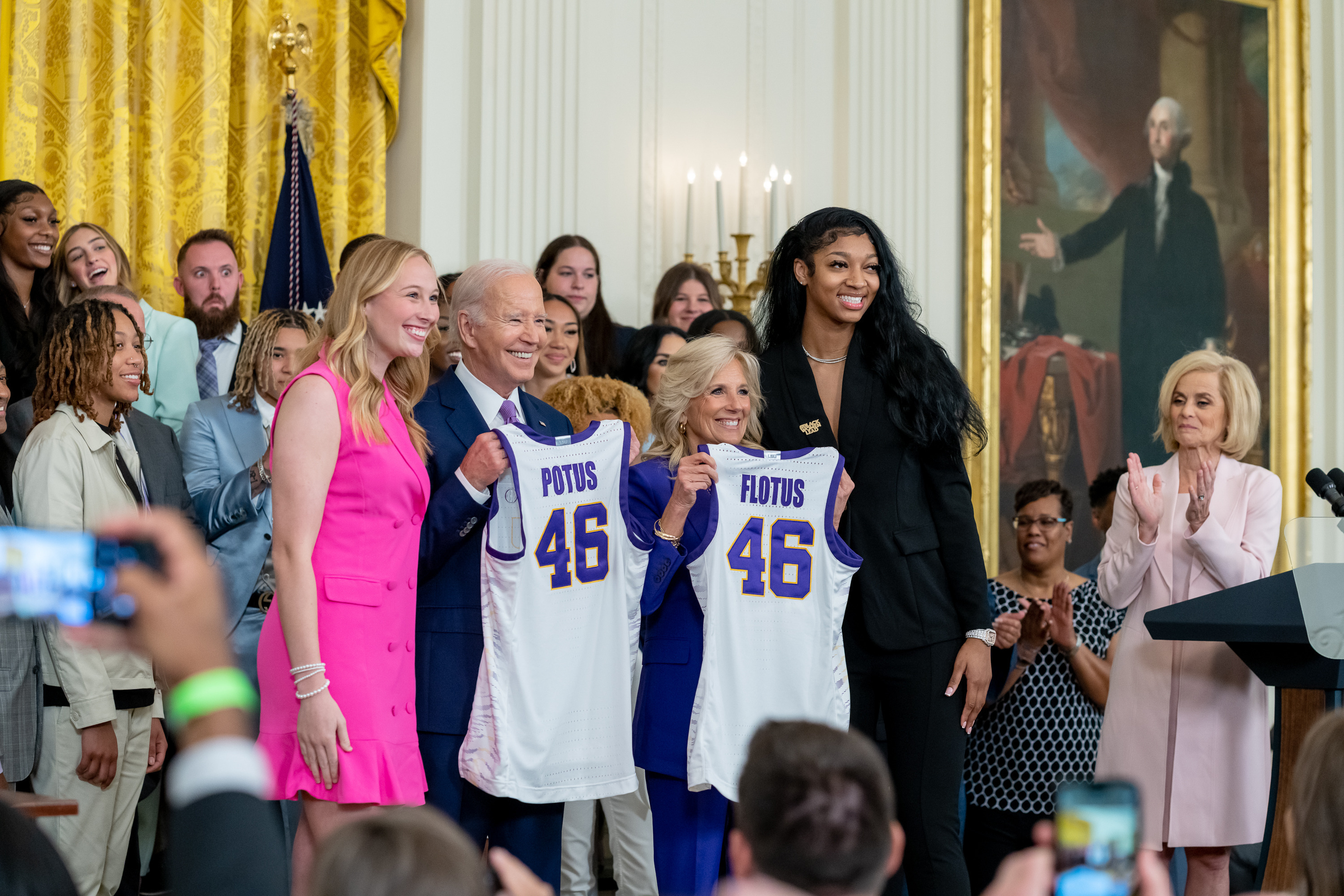
Biden alongside Angel Reese, when the White House visit did finally take place

Biden did commit what The New York Times termed an "unforced error" in April 2023 when, after attending the highly watched championship game of the 2023 NCAA Division I women's basketball tournament, she extended both the losing Iowa Hawkeyes as well as the winning LSU Tigers an invitation to the White House traditionally only extended to winners. The remark was walked back by the first lady's spokesperson, and only LSU was invited, after the game's aftermath became tangled in some racially-oriented discussions regarding the differing treatments given trash-talking behavior by the two teams' top players, LSU's Angel Reese and Iowa's Caitlin Clark. Reese initially took offense at Biden's remark, but the two hugged when the LSU visit to the White House took place in May 2023.

=== Fashion and style ===
In September 2020, Biden wore Stuart Weitzman's black boots with the word "vote" written on them. The boots she wore was sold out immediately and page views for the boots spiked five-fold the next day. At her husband's victory speech in Wilmington, Biden wore an Oscar de la Renta dark-blue floral dress designed by Fernando Garcia and Laura Kim. The dress she wore sold out quickly. In March 2021, her spokesperson stated that the first lady's press team would not comment on her clothes. During her public appearances, Biden has been noted to favor jeans and cashmere sweaters created by American designers with focus on sustainability. On February 13, 2021, Biden posted a photo on Twitter of her shopping for cupcakes in Washington, D.C. while wearing a scrunchie, which went viral. Of the attention the scrunchie photo got, Biden said on The Kelly Clarkson Show, "I still don't understand it."

=== Role in 2024 presidential campaign ===
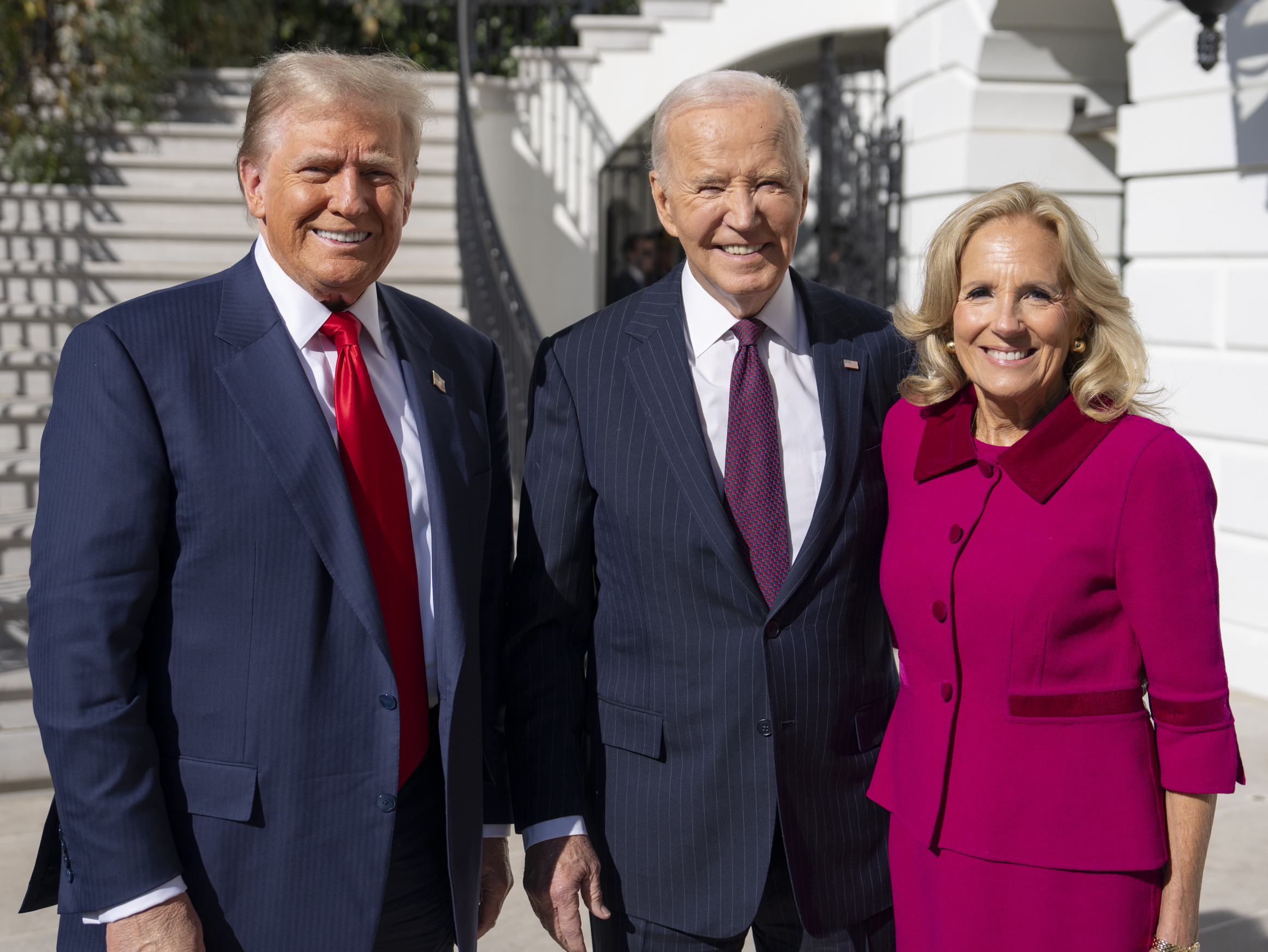
Biden with her husband and Donald Trump during the presidential transition, November 2024

When it came time for her husband to decide whether to run to retain his office in the 2024 United States presidential election, she was strongly in favor of him doing so, in large part to keep Trump, the previous occupant of the White House, from returning to it. The Joe Biden 2024 presidential campaign was announced in April 2023. By February 2024, the subject of Joe Biden's 81 years of age and associated frailties was a central topic of news coverage, especially after the special counsel report in the Joe Biden classified documents incident, and reports indicated that Jill Biden often sought to shield her husband from excessively long appearances or making impromptu remarks. She remained protective of the rest of her family as well, and in early June she shuttled between attending the trial of Hunter Biden on gun charges and official appearances as first lady at an 80th anniversary D-Day commemorative ceremony in France.

On June 27, the first presidential debate took place, and Joe Biden's disastrous performance in it led to renewed concerns about his age and fitness for office and to calls by many Democrats for him to drop out of the race. Jill Biden immediately rallied to her husband's side, praising him at an after-debate watch party by saying "You answered every question, you knew all the facts," and saying that he would stay in the race. In the days following the debate she continued to be adamant on that point, saying she "will not let those 90 minutes define the four years he's been president" and that "We will continue to fight." Insinuations were made by Republicans and even some Democrats that Jill Biden must have been running the White House all along, akin to Edith Wilson, or that her drive to remain in power in Washington made her comparable to Lady Macbeth.

As political pressure mounted on Joe Biden, his circle of close advisors shrunk in size, with those still remaining including Jill and, unusually, Jill's senior advisor Anthony Bernal, leading to concern among Democrats that the president was not getting input from a wide enough base. Jill Biden, meanwhile, was resentful at the number of Democrats and friends who were publicly abandoning her husband.

Eventually, on July 21, 2024, the withdrawal of Joe Biden from the 2024 United States presidential election was announced. It came as a sudden statement on a weekend, which Jill Biden had advocated for as a way of making it sound like something her husband had chosen to do rather than been forced and thus preserving his dignity. She subsequently publicly thanked her husband's supporters and urged them to work for the candidate he had endorsed, Vice President Kamala Harris.

== Subsequent activities (2025–present) ==
Vice President Harris went on to lose the election in November 2024, setting up a return to power of the previous administration. In December 2024, Jill Biden announced that she had finished the semester and had "taught ... my final class ever at Northern Virginia Community College." It was not stated whether she might teach again elsewhere.

No longer in office, the Bidens returned to Delaware. The presidential loss in 2024 had come amid a series of defeats for Democrats at multiple electoral levels and vote-share declines in many demographics, and occasioned considerable soul-searching about what had gone wrong. A spate of books came out about the campaign and election and how President Biden's team had behaved in regards to him. One of these works, Original Sin, looked back at crucial stages of her husband's presidency and re-election campaign and portrayed her as having been increasingly involved in her husband's decision-making process and unwilling to take to heart any critical views about his abilities to do the job going forward. With respect to post-mortems of that time, she objected to criticisms of her having been too protective of her husband, especially when they came "from some of our so-called friends", with one example of that being Alexandra Pelosi's having analogized her to Lady Macbeth, which she said was "very hurtful".

In April 2025, it was announced that Biden was taking on the position of chair of a new Women's Health Network initiative with the Milken Institute. This was seen as a follow-on to her role in the White House Initiative on Women's Health Research.

In May 2025, Leo Terrell, the Senior Counsel to the Assistant Attorney General for Civil Rights, drew media attention after suggesting that Jill Biden should face criminal charges for "elder abuse". He argued that she was aware of President Joe Biden's health issues yet remained silent during his reelection campaign. Terrell reiterated his stance in a series of posts on X, including one that read, "Elder Abuse! Criminal Charges??"

Biden's book View from the East Wing: A Memoir was published in June 2026 by Gallery Books. In it, she fully discusses for the first time her feelings around the end of her husband's reelection campaign in 2024. During that month, Biden and her husband also attended the opening ceremony for the Barack Obama Presidential Center.

== Writings ==
=== Books ===
- Jacobs-Biden, Jill (Fall 2006). Student Retention at the Community College: Meeting Students' Needs (D.Ed. thesis). Newark, DE: University of Delaware. UMI Number: 3247570.
- Biden, Jill (2012). Don't Forget, God Bless Our Troops. Illustrations by Raúl Colón. New York: Paula Wiseman Book/Beach Lane Books. ISBN 978-1442457355. OCLC 773671899. Children's book.
- Biden, Jill (2019). Where the Light Enters: Building a Family, Discovering Myself. New York: Flatiron Books. ISBN 9781250182326.
- Biden, Jill (2020). Joey: The Story of Joe Biden. Illustrations by Amy June Bates. New York: Simon & Schuster. ISBN 9781534480537. Children's book.
- Biden, Jill; Capucilli, Alyssa Satin (2024). Willow the White House Cat. Illustrations by Kate Berube. New York: Paula Wiseman Book/Beach Lane Books. ISBN 978-1665952057. OCLC 1428131659.
- Biden, Jill (2026). View from the East Wing: A Memoir. New York: Gallery Books. ISBN 9781668222881.

=== Authored articles ===
- First Lady Jill Biden; HRH The Duchess of Cambridge (June 12, 2021). "This Is What Our Kids Deserve". CNN. Archived from the original on June 12, 2023.
- First Lady Jill Biden (November 16, 2021). "Jill Biden: What to do if you want to protect your kids". CNN. Archived from the original on June 12, 2023.
- Biden, Jill; Dole, Elizabeth (April 22, 2022). "The Service and Sacrifice of Our Military Caregiver Kids Deserves to Be Supported and Recognized". Fox News. Archived from the original on June 11, 2023.
- Biden, Jill (May 13, 2022). "Jill Biden: What Ukrainian Mothers Taught Me About This War". CNN. Archived from the original on June 12, 2023.
- Biden, Jill (April 21, 2023). "The Resilience and Grit of Military Children Is Unparalleled". Parents. Archived from the original on June 11, 2023.

== Notes ==
Honorary titles
Preceded by Lynne Cheney	Second Lady of the United States; 2009–2017	Succeeded by Karen Pence
Preceded by Melania Trump	First Lady of the United States; 2021–2025	Succeeded by Melania Trump
