= F. R. White =

American football coach

Biographical details
- Born: December 4, 1899; South Norfolk, Virginia, U.S.
- Died: April 15, 1969 (aged 69); Newport News, Virginia, U.S.

Coaching career (HC unless noted)
- 1929–1931: Apprentice
- 1933: Apprentice

Head coaching record
- Overall: 8–23–4

Fairmount Richard' "Monk" White (December 4, 1899 – April 15, 1969) was an American college football coach. He was the sixth and then later the eighth head football coach at The Apprentice School in Newport News, Virginia. He held that position for four seasons, from 1929 until 1931 and again in 1933. His coaching record at Apprentice was 8–23–4.

White was appointed Assistant to the General Manager for Development of Supervisory Personnel at The Apprentice School in 1962. Previously he had served as Director of Education and Training. He died of a heart ailment in 1969.
