= G. R. Heflin =

American football player and coach (1923–1999)

Biographical details
- Born: February 22, 1923
- Died: October 23, 1999 (aged 76); Richmond, Virginia, U.S.

Playing career
- 1943: William & Mary
- 1946: William & Mary
- 1948–1950: William & Mary

Coaching career (HC unless noted)
- 1960–1961: Apprentice

Head coaching record
- Overall: 4–10

George Robert Heflin (February 22, 1923 – October 23, 1999) was an American football player and coach. Heflin was the 17th head football coach at The Apprentice School in Newport News, Virginia and he held that position for two seasons, from 1960 until 1961. His coaching record at Apprentice was 4–10. He died after a long illness in 1999.
