= R. L. Patterson =

American football coach

Biographical details
- Born: September 27, 1900
- Died: February 21, 1993 (aged 92)

Coaching career (HC unless noted)
- 1926: Apprentice

Head coaching record
- Overall: 1–6

Robert Lee Patterson (September 27, 1900 – February 21, 1993) was an American football coach. He was the fourth head football coach at The Apprentice School in Newport News, Virginia and he held that position for the 1926 season. His coaching record at Apprentice was 1–6.
