= The Apprentice School =

Shipbuilding vocational school in Virginia, U.S.

Coordinates: 36°59′26.5″N 76°25′58″W

- Motto: Leadership, Craftsmanship, Scholarship
- Type: Three to five-year apprenticeship program
- Established: 1919
- Academic staff: 16 academic instructors, 50+ craft instructors
- Students: 725
- Location: Newport News, Virginia, U.S.
- Campus: Urban/shipyard
- Colors: Maroon, gold, & black
- Nickname: Builders
- Sporting affiliations: USCAA, NCWA
- Website: www.as.edu

The Apprentice School is a four to eight-year apprenticeship vocational school founded in 1919 and operated by Newport News Shipbuilding & Dry Dock Company in Newport News in the U.S. state of Virginia. The school trains students for careers in the shipbuilding industry. The school announced in April 2021 that it would begin awarding associate degrees in 26 maritime programs to its students beginning in 2023. Additionally, students can also earn associate degrees through a partnership with Virginia Peninsula Community College and bachelor degrees through a partnership with Old Dominion University. The school's athletic teams compete under the nickname of 'Builders' and competes with other small colleges.

== History ==
On July 1, 1919 (107 years ago), the Apprentice School was established at Newport News Shipbuilding & Dry Dock Company, by issue of Executive Order No. 24, signed by General manager Homer L. Ferguson.

In 1982 (44 years ago), the school was first awarded accreditation by the Commission on Occupational Education Institutions, Southern Association of Colleges and Schools (OCE, SACS).

In 1995 (31 years ago), the school transferred its accreditation from OCE, SACS to the Accrediting Commission of the Council on Occupational Education (ACCOE).

On April 23, 2014 (12 years ago), a new Professional Development Program was started in partnership with Old Dominion University.

== Admissions ==
Admissions is competitive at the school, although an exact admission rate is not published. Applications are accepted on a rolling basis.

Monthly selection meetings are held at which all qualified applicants are considered for available openings. Offers are extended to applicants whom the admissions office determines to be best qualified for the openings available.

Successful candidates are offered both employment at Newport News Shipbuilding and enrollment at The Apprentice School. Each successful candidate will be scheduled for a medical examination, including a substance abuse screening test administered by Newport News Shipbuilding's medical department. Employment and enrollment is contingent on the results of the medical examination. Candidates to whom an offer is extended will be subject to a United States Government security investigation and must meet eligibility requirements for access to classified information.

== Academics ==
All apprentices are required to complete the school's "World Class Shipbuilder Curriculum" (a series of 13 classes covering various topics such as shipbuilding basics) and applicable courses in the "Trade Related Education Curriculum". The curriculum gives students the opportunity to earn an associate degree from Thomas Nelson Community College or Tidewater Community College.

Apprenticeships are offered in 17 skilled trades:

- Heating & Air Conditioning
- Pipefitter - Maintenance
- Painter-Insulator
- Outside Machinist
- Heavy Metal Fabricator
- Non-Destructive Tester (NDT)
- Shipfitter
- Welder & Welding Equipment Repair
- Dimensional Control Technician
- Machinist
- Sheet Metal Worker
- Rigger
- Electrician
- Electrician Maintenance
- Millwright

Advanced programs are offered in five areas:

- Marine Designer
- Modeling & Simulation
- Nuclear Test Technician
- Production Planner
- Advanced Shipyard Operations

A Professional Development Program, in partnership with Old Dominion University, enables students to earn a bachelor's degree in electrical and mechanical engineering.

== Campus ==
The school is physically located at Huntington Ingalls Industries' Newport News Shipbuilding. Some of the upper-level academic courses are taken at Thomas Nelson Community College and Tidewater Community College.

In December 2013, Newport News Shipbuilding officially opened up the new Apprentice School, located on Washington Avenue. The new facility tripled the available instructional space to include eight computer labs, two video teleconferencing classrooms, a physics lab, and a 600-seat gymnasium.

== Athletics ==
The Apprentice School Builder.

The Apprentice School fields seven athletic teams including baseball, men's and women's basketball, football, men's golf, and men's and women's wrestling. Because it does not grant degrees, it is not affiliated with the NCAA or NAIA. The school competes as a member of the United States Collegiate Athletic Association (USCAA). The Apprentice School also holds athletic affiliation in the National Collegiate Wrestling Association (NCWA).

Apprentice's football team was a member of the Atlantic Central Football Conference. Since the dissolution of the conference following the 2010 season, The Apprentice School has been playing football as an unaffiliated independent team. In 2018, The Apprentice School football team joined NCFA's Mid Atlantic Conference, which is broken into East and West Division. The Apprentice School won the 2018 NCFA National Championship with a 56–14 win over Oakland University in Wheeling, West Virginia, on the campus of West Liberty University. The football program returned to an independent USCAA varsity schedule for the 2019 season.
