= Bay Path University =

Private university in Longmeadow, Massachusetts, US

Coordinates: 42°3′19.9″N 72°34′59.45″W

- The Bay Path University seal
- Former names: Bay Path Institute; Bay Path Secretarial School; Bay Path Junior College; Bay Path College
- Motto: Carpe Diem
- Motto in English: Seize the Day
- Type: Private university
- Established: 1897
- Academic affiliations: Cooperating Colleges of Greater Springfield
- Endowment: $31 million
- President: Sandra J. Doran
- Students: 2,605 (fall 2024)
- Undergraduates: 1,177 (fall 2024)
- Postgraduates: 1,428 (fall 2024)
- Location: Longmeadow, Massachusetts, United States
- Campus: Suburban
- Colors: Maroon and white
- Mascot: Wildcats
- Website: www.baypath.edu

Bay Path University is a private university in Longmeadow, Massachusetts, United States. Bay Path offers both all-women bachelor's degree programs (both on-campus and online) and co-educational graduate programs.

Founded in 1897 as the Bay Path Institute, the college has undergone several name changes. From 1988 to 2014 it was known as Bay Path College. Bay Path University is a member of the Cooperating Colleges of Greater Springfield, an eight-college consortium.

== History ==
Bay Path was founded in 1897 as Bay Path Institute in Springfield, Massachusetts. It started as an urban, coeducational institute offering business teacher training, secretarial science, business administration, and accounting degrees. The name Bay Path derived from its location on the old Bay Path (a part of Boston Post Road), which united the western part of the state with what was once the Massachusetts Bay Colony. The first class had 30 students, but Bay Path grew rapidly in its first few decades. In 1920, Bay Path bought the Clawson-Hamilton Business School of Brattleboro, Vermont, and renamed it the Brattleboro Business Institute. The same year, the competitor Griffin Business School was also purchased and integrated into Bay Path. Bay Path was one of the largest and most successful business schools in the highly competitive Northeast at the time, with a peak enrollment of 1,200 students. But the institution struggled during the Great Depression and World War II and by 1944 was nearly bankrupt.

In 1945, the college moved to Longmeadow, Massachusetts, was renamed Bay Path Secretarial School, and became a women's-only college. Four years later, the institution became Bay Path Junior College. In 1988, Bay Path became a four-year degree-granting institution, and its name was changed to Bay Path College.

In 1999, Bay Path established an accelerated program for women to earn their bachelor's degree through a Saturday-only program. In 2000, Bay Path began offering Master of Science degrees. After 14 years of offering master's degree programs, reaching 20 master's degree offerings in 2014, Bay Path changed its name to Bay Path University to reflect its status as both a bachelor's and master's granting institution.

In February 2024, Bay Path University announced its planned acquisition of Cambridge College, a private college based in Boston.

== Academics ==
Bay Path University offers bachelor's and master's degrees, the Occupational Therapy doctorate, and the EdD. Degree programs are balanced between those with an arts and science focus and those with professional focus. The university has 30 major programs for bachelor's degrees and 30+ degree and certification programs at the graduate level. Bay Path has a student to faculty ratio of 12:1 in its undergraduate programs, and its freshmen retention rate is 74.3%.

The master's degree programs are coeducational, but the bachelor's degree programs are women-focused, meaning they accentuate research on local and global issues that affect women. Bay Path University is accredited by the New England Commission of Higher Education.

== Campuses ==
=== Longmeadow Campus ===
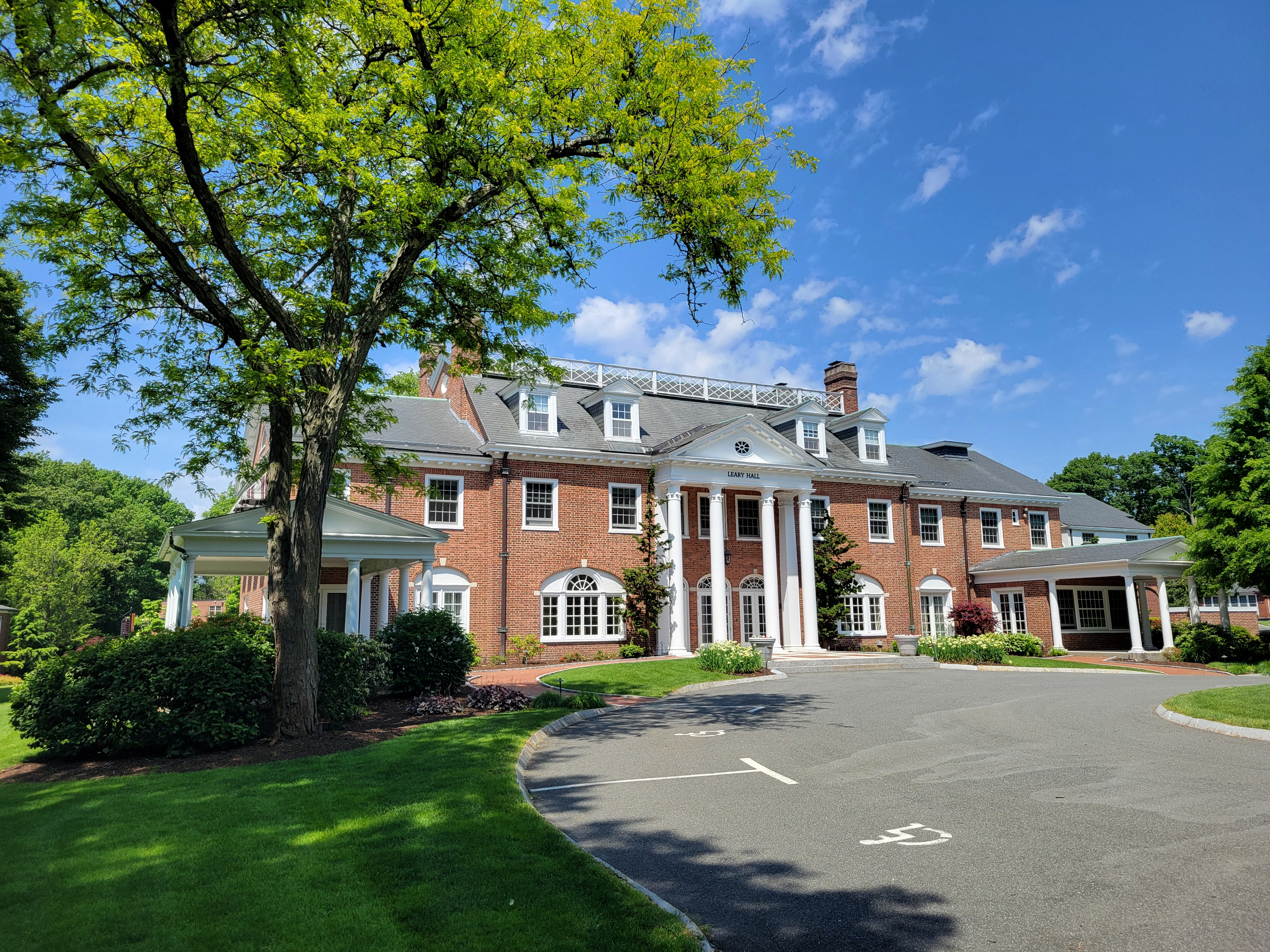
Leary Hall

Bay Path University's primary campus is in the suburban town of Longmeadow, Massachusetts, in Pioneer Valley along the Connecticut River. The 46-acre (190,000 m^{2}) campus is adjacent to the Longmeadow Historic District, notable for having over 100 homes built before the 1900s, and the college owns a number of historic homes in town. The Longmeadow campus started with the 1945 purchase of the Wallace estate. The 18-acre estate had three buildings in 1945: a Georgian American colonial mansion (now Leary Hall), a large garage with turntable for parking cars (Glen Hall), and a cottage (Annex). After decades of growth and expansion, the campus now has 14 academic and administrative buildings and six homes principally used for faculty offices.

=== Graduate Center for Health Sciences ===
The Philip H. Ryan Health Science Center is in East Longmeadow, Massachusetts and houses graduate programs in education, healthcare, and psychology.

== Student life ==
Bay Path has 27 clubs and organizations for students with a wide range of interests.

=== Athletics ===
The Bay Path athletic teams are called the Wildcats. The university is a member of the United States Collegiate Athletic Association (USCAA) and has competed in its Division I ranks since the 2021–22 academic year.

Bay Path fields volleyball, softball, and soccer as varsity sports.

The Wildcats previously competed as a member of the National Collegiate Athletic Association (NCAA) at the Division III ranks, primarily as a member of the New England Collegiate Conference (NECC) from 2008–09 to 2020–21; and before that as a charter member of the North Atlantic Conference (NAC) from 1996–97 to 2007–08.

== Ranking ==
In 2014, The Chronicle of Higher Education compiled a list of the fastest-growing U.S. colleges from 2002 to 2012. During that time, in the category of private, baccalaureate institutions, Bay Path's growth was the eighth-highest in the nation, higher than any other college's in the knowledge corridor. Over the period surveyed, Bay Path grew from 1,107 students to 2,370, a 114% increase.

In 2015, president Carol A. Leary and Bay Path were ranked #25 in The Boston Globe and The Commonwealth Institute's annual list of the Top 100 Women-Led Businesses in Massachusetts.
