= National Center for Telecommunications Technologies =

The National Center for Telecommunications Technologies (NCTT) was established in 1997 as a division of Springfield Technical Community College (STCC), in Springfield, Massachusetts in the United States. NCTT is one of 14 National Science Foundation Advanced Technological Education Resource Centers of Excellence, each one organized around a specific technology focus. NCTT is charged with leading a national collaborative of business and education partners to develop and disseminate an always relevant, industry-driven curriculum to teach and train tomorrow's ICT technicians and technologists.

The Information and Communications Technologies (ICT) industry - driven by demand for instantly accessible information - is profoundly transforming the world. Voice, data, and video communications across a worldwide network are creating challenges and opportunities that did not exist even a few years ago.

The major challenge today for the ICT industry and increasingly for ICT-dependent industries is to secure an appropriately skilled workforce that will insure their companies can compete effectively in the global marketplace. With even more rapid breakthroughs in technology anticipated in the coming years, education is the key to their success.

In 2008 the center was renamed the National Center for Information and Communications Technologies (ICT Center).
