= WTCC =

WTCC may refer to:

- WTCC (FM), a radio station (90.7 FM) licensed to Springfield, Massachusetts, United States
- World Touring Car Championship, an international motor racing championship for Touring Cars, organised by the FIA
- World Trade and Convention Centre, a convention centre in Halifax, Nova Scotia, Canada
- Colombo World Trade Center, the World Trade Center of Sri Lanka
- Wake Technical Community College a two-year college located in Raleigh, North Carolina USA
- World Team Chess Championship
