= National Collegiate Wrestling Association =

North American college sports organization

- Abbreviation: NCWA
- Formation: 1997
- Legal status: Association
- Headquarters: Dallas, Texas, U.S.
- Region served: United States and Canada
- Members: 162 (schools, conferences or other associations)
- Executive Director: Jim Giunta
- Main organ: Executive Committee
- Website: NCWA official website

The National Collegiate Wrestling Association (NCWA) is a nonprofit association of 162 institutions, conferences, organizations and individuals that organize the wrestling programs of many colleges and universities in the United States and Canada. It is led by founder and executive director Jim Giunta headquartered in Dallas, Texas and built to help the promotion of collegiate wrestling.

Many teams were formerly NCAA programs displaced by Title IX legislation and/or are preparing to join the NCAA, NAIA, or NJCAA. Teams in transition to a higher division not eligible for the NCAA postseason also compete in the NCWA. Notable wrestling programs to have started or competed in the NCWA and are now in other associations include: Bellarmine, California Baptist, Lindenwood - St. Charles, McKendree, Notre Dame College, Queens, and Southern Illinois Edwardsville.

== History ==
A post-secondary athletic association built to help the promotion of collegiate wrestling, the NCWA was founded in 1997 as a 501c3 non-profit by the current executive director, Jim Giunta, after resigning as executive director of the Texas Interscholastic Wrestling Association (TIWA). At its founding the association had 13 member teams, but today the NCWA is composed of over 150 wrestling teams and clubs from across the United States and Canada. Many of these programs are from schools that formerly fielded NCAA scholarship programs. The variety of institutions competing in the NCWA is wide and unrestricted as junior colleges, trade schools and post-secondary prep institutions compete in the same national championship as four-year colleges and universities.

=== NCWA Growth ===
Season	# of Men's Teams
1997-1998	26
1998-1999	35
1999-2000	44
2000-2001	56
2001-2002	68
2002-2003	80
2003-2004	95
2004-2005	109
2005-2006	122
2006-2007	134
2007-2008	142
2008-2009	154
2009-2010	163
2010-2011	170
2011-2012	156
2012-2013	
2013-2014	
2014-2015	
2015-2016	
2016-2017	170
2017-2020	
2018-2020	
2019-2020	154
2020-2021	No season (COVID-19)
2021-2022	151
2022-2023	155
2023-2024	116

Season	# of Women's Teams
2007-2008	7
2008-2009	
2009-2010	
2010-2011	16
2011-2012	18
2012-2013	15
2013-2014	10
2014-2015	15
2015-2016	22
2016-2017	24
2017-2018	35
2018-2019	
2019-2020	54
2020-2021	No season (COVID-19)
2021-2022	68
2022-2023	60
2023-2024	62

Season	# of GoGreco Teams
2017	8
2018	8
2019	10
2020	No season (COVID-19)
2021	No season (COVID-19)

=== Notable current teams ===
While the NCWA currently has over 100 schools in competition, a few programs have distinguished themselves as top-tier programs.

==== Men's folkstyle ====
Institution	Year Entered NCWA	Conference	All-Americans and National Champions	Team Championships	Notes
Apprentice	2000	Mid-Atlantic	148 All-Americans; 15 National Champions	3x Northeast Conference champions (1999, 2002, 2003); 8x Mid-Atlantic Conference champions (2004 - 2011); 12 top-8 finishes at National Dual Meet Championship; 24 top-10 finishes at Division I National Championships; 2009 National Champions	
Auburn	1997	Southeast	26 All-Americans; 1 National Champion	6 top-10 finishes at Division I National Championships; 15th at 2013 National Dual Meet Championship	One of the original NCWA teams
UCF	2003	Southeast	133 All-Americans; 14 National Champions	15x Southeast Conference champions (2003 - 2005, 2007, 2008, 2010 - 2013, 2015, 2019, 2020, 2022 - 2024); 3x National Championships titles (2004, 2005, 2010); 10 top-5 finishes at National Dual Meet Championship; 2016 National Dual Meet Champions; 21 top-10 finishes at Division I National Championships; 2016 Collegiate Cup champions	Train out of Southeast Olympic Regional Training Center
Grand Valley State	2000	Great Lakes	161 All-Americans; 23 National Champions; Most individual All-Americans in NCWA history	2x Northern Conference champions (2001, 2002); 8x North Central Conference champions (2003 - 2009, 2011); 2010 North Central Conference Co-Champions; 7x Great Lakes Conference champions (2013 - 2018, 2022 - 2023); 11 top-6 finishes at National Dual Meet Championship; 2009 National Dual Meet Champions; 17 top-5 finishes at National Championships; 5x National Championships titles (2001, 2002, 2006, 2007, 2008)	Wrestling program had competed in NCAA D-I, D-II, D-III, and NAIA until 1992; Added men's and women's wrestling at NCAA Division II level in 2023; NCWA program is Division II as of 2023-2024 season
Grays Harbor	2015	Northwest	26 All-Americans; 2 National Champions	2023 Northwest Conference champions; 6 top-10 finishes at Division I National Championships; 2020 Division I National Championship runner-ups	
Liberty	2011	Mid-Atlantic	122 All-Americans; 31 National Champions; Most individual champions in NCWA history	12x Mid-Atlantic Conference champions (2012 - 2020, 2022 - 2024); 10 top-3 finishes at National Dual Meet Championship; 6x National Dual Meet Champions (2012, 2015, 2018 - 2020, 2022); 12 top-4 finishes at Division I National Championships; 5x Division I National Champions (2015, 2018 - 2020, 2022); 5x Collegiate Cup champions (2015, 2018 - 2020, 2022)	Competed as an NCAA D-I program prior to joining the NCWA in 2011
Lindenwood	2011-2013, 2023	Southwest	21 All-Americans; 3 National Champions	2 top-2 finishes at Great Plains Conference Championships; 2012 Great Plains Conference champions; 2024 Southwest Conference champions; 2 top-2 finishes at National Dual Meet Championship; 2013 National Dual Meet Champions; 3 top-5 finishes at Division I National Championships; 2013 Division I National Championships Runner-up	Previously competed in NCWA from 2011 to 2013 when transitioning from NAIA to NCAA Division II; Started transition from NCAA Division II to Division I in 2022-2023 school year, full membership expected in 2026; School discontinued NCAA Division I program in 2023
Lyon	2023	Southwest		3rd at 2024 Southwest Conference Championships; 17th at 2024 Division I National Championships	Started transition from NAIA to NCAA Division III in 2022-2023 school year, full membership expected in 2026
Menlo	2024	West Coast	19 All-Americans; 9 National Champions		Started transition from NAIA to NCAA Division II in 2023-2024 school year, full membership expected in 2026
Middle Tennessee State	1999	Mid-Atlantic	28 All-Americans	5 top-8 National Dual Meet Championship finishes; 2015 Division I National Championships Runner-up; 4 top-10 National Championship finishes	Coached by Steven Smith
Puerto Rico - Mayagüez	2022	Puerto Rico		2x Puerto Rico Conference champions (2023-2024)	
Queens	2022	Puerto Rico	5 All-Americans; 2 National Champions	3rd at 2018 Mid-Atlantic Conference championships; 5th at 2018 Division I National Championships; 3rd at 2023 NWCA National Dual Meet Championship - NCWA Division	Transitioning from NCAA Division II to Division I, completing transition in 2026; Was previously in NCWA for 2017-2018 season due to adding wrestling program; School discontinued NCAA Division I program in 2024
Thomas More	2023	Great Lakes	9 All-Americans; 2 National Champions	2nd at 2024 Great Lakes Conference championships; 2nd at 2024 NWCA National Dual Meet Championship - NCWA Division	Started transition from NAIA to NCAA Division III in 2022-2023 school year, full membership expected in 2026
Vanguard	2024	West Coast	1 All-American		Started transition from NAIA to NCAA Division II in 2023-2024 school year, full membership expected in 2026
Yale	1997	Northeast	20 All-Americans; 3 National Champions	1998 National Champions; 5 top-20 finishes at National Championships	Won the inaugural NCWA National Championships

==== Women's folkstyle ====
Institution	Year Entered NCWA	Conference	All-Americans and National Champions	Team Championships	Notes
Utah Tech	2019	West Coast	6 All-Americans; 2 National Champions; Outstanding Wrestler of National Tournament 2024	4th Place Team 2024; 3rd Place Collegiate Cup 2024; 4th Place National Duals 2024	Head Coach Corey Anderson Formerly Dixie State University
Big Bend	2022	Northwest	6 All-Americans; 2 National Champions	2022 National Champions	Also compete in NJCAA
Florida State	2010	Southeast	6 All-Americans	3 top-10 finishes at National Championships	
Grays Harbor	2018	Northwest	16 All-Americans; 7 National Champions	2x National Champions (2019, 2024); 2020 National Championship runner-up	Also compete in NJCAA
North Texas	2014	Southwest	9 All-Americans; 2 National Champions	5 top-10 finishes at National Championships	
Ottawa - Arizona	2018	West Coast	3 All-Americans; 1 National Champions	Won 2022 NCWA Women's National Dual Meet Championship	
Springfield Tech	2014	Northeast	11 All-Americans; 6 National Champions	5 top-10 finishes at National Championships	

=== Notable former teams ===
While the NCWA currently has over 100 schools in competition, it has also been home to many programs that transitioned from one association to another or that originated as an NCWA program and later changed associations.

==== Men's folkstyle ====
Institution	Year Entered NCWA	Previous Association	Year Left NCWA	Next Association	Current Association	Notes
Air Force Prep	2003	Started in NCWA	2017	No association		#16 at 2003 National Championships; #15 at 2005 National Championships; #7 at 2009 National Championships; #12 at 2011 Division I National Championships; #13 at 2013 Division I National Championships; 2014 Great Plains Conference champions; #9 at 2014 Division I National Championships; #3 at 2015 Great Plains Conference champions; #8 at 2015 Division I National Championships; #7 at 2016 Division I National Championships; #2 at 2015 Great Plains Conference champions; #5 at 2017 Division I National Championships; 34 All-Americans; 9 National Champions; Vast majority of student-athletes transfer to United States Air Force Academy
Alfred State	2013	NJCAA	2018	NCAA Division III		#12 at 2014 Division I National Championships; #18 at 2015 Division I National Championships; #10 at 2016 Division I National Championships; #6 at 2017 National Dual Meet Championship; #2 at 2017 Northeast Conference championships; #12 at 2017 Division I National Championships; #2 at 2018 Northeast Conference championships; #11 at 2018 Division I National Championships; 8 All-Americans; 1 National Champion
Allen	2021	NAIA	2024	NCAA Division II		#3 at 2022 Mid-Atlantic Conference championships; #18 at 2022 Division I National Championships; #3 at 2023 Mid-Atlantic Conference championships; #10 at 2023 Division I National Championships; #3 at 2024 Mid-Atlantic Conference championships; #9 at 2024 Division I National Championships; 6 All-Americans
Army Prep	2008	Started in NCWA	2014	No association		#7 at 2008 National Championships; #6 at 2009 National Championships; #11 at 2010 National Championships; #10 at 2011 Division I National Championships; #15 at 2013 Division I National Championships; #10 at 2014 Division I National Championships; 16 All-Americans; 2 National Champions; Vast majority of student-athletes transfer to United States Military Academy (Army)
Bellarmine	2022	NCAA Division II	2024	NCAA Division I		2023 NWCA National Dual Meet Champions - NCWA Division; #2 at 2023 Great Lakes Conference championships; 2023 Division I National Champions; 2023 Collegiate Cup champions; 2024 NWCA National Dual Meet Champions - NCWA Division; 2024 Great Lakes Conference champions; 2024 Division I National Champions; 17 All-Americans; 10 National Champions
Belmont Abbey	1998	Started in NCWA	2006	NCAA Division II		#22 at 1999 National Championships; #23 at 2000 National Championships; #7 at 2001 National Championships; #21 at 2002 National Championships; #10 at 2003 National Championships; #12 at 2004 National Championships; 7 All-Americans
California Baptist	2010	NAIA	2013	NCAA; Division II	NCAA Division I	2011 National Dual Meet Champions; 2011 West Coast Conference champions; 2011 Division I National Champions; 2012 West Coast Conference champions; #2 at 2012 Division I National Championships; 2013 West Coast Conference champions; 2013 Division I National Champions; 24 All-Americans; 6 National Champions; 1st team to win both the National Duals and National Championships in the same season
Clarks Summit	1999	NCCAA	2003	Dropped program		#13 at 2000 National Championships; #18 at 2001 National Championships; #7 at 2002 National Championships; #8 at 2003 National Championships; 8 All-Americans; 2 National Champions; Was Baptist Bible while in NCWA (name changed in 2016)
Colorado State – Pueblo	2002	Program restarted in the NCWA	2008	NCAA Division II		#4 at 2002 National Championships; #11 at 2003 National Championships; 7 All-Americans; 2 National Champions; Was Southern Colorado while in NCWA (name changed in 2003)
Darton State	2006	Started in NCWA	2008	NJCAA	Program dropped	#50 at 2006 National Championships; #7 at 2007 National Championships; #16 at 2008 National Championships; 5 All-Americans
Davenport	2014	Started in NCWA	2015	NAIA	NCAA; Division II	#13 at 2015 Division I National Championships; 2 All-Americans; 2 National Champions
Douglas	2001	Started in NCWA	2014	Dropped program		#14 at 2001 National Championships; #12 at 2002 National Championships; #6 at 2003 National Championships; #5 at 2004 National Championships; #9 at 2005 National Championships; #16 at 2006 National Championships; #19 at 2009 National Championships; #27 at 2010 National Championships; #14 at 2011 Division I National Championships; #62 at 2012 Division I National Championships; #21 at 2013 Division I National Championships; #19 at 2014 Division I National Championships; 23 All-Americans; 7 National Champions
Emmanuel	2015	Started in NCWA	2018	NCAA Division II		#5 at 2016 National Dual Meet Championships; 3x Southeast Conference champions (2016-2018); 2x Division I National Championships (2016-2017); 2017 National Dual Meet Champions; 2017 Collegiate Cup champions; #2 at 2018 National Dual Meet Championships; #7 at 2018 Division I National Championships; 22 All-Americans; 8 National Champions
Emory and Henry	2021	NCAA Division III	2024	NCAA Division II		#8 at 2022 Mid-Atlantic Conference championships; #34 at 2022 Division I National Championships; #7 at 2022 NWCA National Dual Meet Championship - NCWA Division; #8 at 2023 Mid-Atlantic Conference championships; #24 at 2023 Division I National Championships; #7 at 2024 Mid-Atlantic Conference championships; #30 at 2024 Division I National Championships; 1 All-American
Fresno State	2014	Program restarted in the NCWA	2017	NCAA Division I		#33 at 2015 Division II National Championships; #22 at 2016 Division II National Championships; #28 at 2017 Division II National Championships; 4 All-American
Grand Canyon	2013	NCAA Division II	2014	NCAA; Division I	Program dropped	2014 National Dual Meet Champions; 2014 West Coast Conference champions; 2014 Division I National Champions; 10 All-Americans; 4 National Champions
Henry Ford	2013	Started in NCWA	2017	NJCAA		#31 at 2014 Division II National Championships; #27 at 2015 Division II National Championships; #19 at 2016 Division II National Championships; #20 at 2017 Division I National Championships; 2 All-Americans
Kansas State	1999	Restarted program in NCWA	2012	Dropped program		#8 at 1999 National Championships; #13 at 2000 National Championships; 2001 Southwestern Conference champions; #5 at 2001 National Championships; 2002 Southwestern Conference champions; #9 at 2002 National Championships; 2003 Southwest Conference champions; #9 at 2003 National Championships; #20 at 2004 National Championships; 2005 Southwest Conference champions; #10 at 2005 National Championships; #10 at 2006 National Championships; #13 at 2007 National Championships; #8 at 2008 National Championships; 2009 Southwest Conference champions; #9 at 2009 National Championships; #28 at 2010 National Championships; #28 at 2011 Division II National Championships; #29 at 2012 Division II National Championships; 28 All-Americans; 2 National Champions
Lincoln Memorial	2021	Started in NCWA	2022	NCAA Division II		#7 at Mid-Atlantic Conference championships; #52 at 2022 NCWA Division I National Championships
Lindenwood - Belleville	2011	Started in NCWA	2013	NAIA	Program dropped	#5 at 2012 National Dual Meet Championship; #10 at 2012 Division I National Championships; #7 at 2013 National Dual Meet Championship; #7 at 2013 Division I National Championships; 8 All-Americans; 2 National Champions
Linfield	2021	Started in NCWA	2022	NCAA Division II		#7 at 2022 NCWA Northwest Conference championships; #57 at 2022 NCWA Division I National Championship
Maine Maritime	2018	Started in NCWA	2024	NCAA Division III		#13 at 2019 Northwest Conference championships; #6 at 2020 Northwest Conference championships; #6 at 2022 Northwest Conference championships; #4 at 2023 Northwest Conference championships; #5 at 2024 Northwest Conference championships; #33 at 2024 Division I National Championships; 1 All-American
Maranatha Baptist	1998	NCCAA	1999	Program dropped		#4 at 1999 National Championships; 3 All-Americans; 3 National Champions
Marion Military	2003	Started in NCWA	2016	Program dropped		#19 at 2003 National Championships; #8 at 2004 National Championships; #5 at 2007 National Championships; #5 at 2008 National Championships; #9 at 2009 National Dual Meet Championships; 2009 Southeast Conference champions; #4 at 2009 National Championships; 2010 National Dual Meet Champions; #8 at 2010 National Championships; #5 at 2011 National Dual Meet Championship; #5 at 2011 Division I National Championships; 2009 Southeast Conference champions; #15 at 2012 Division I National Championships; #6 at 2013 National Dual Meet Championship; #11 at 2013 Division I National Championships; #15 at 2014 Division I National Championships; #5 at 2015 National Dual Meet Championship; #5 at 2015 Division I National Championships; #14 at 2016 National Dual Meet Championship; #12 at 2016 Division I National Championships; 40 All-Americans; 4 National Champions; Coached by Olympians David Hazewinkel and Jim Hazewinkel from 2006 to 2016.
McKendree	2011	NAIA	2013	NCAA Division II		#9 at 2012 Division I National Championships; #2 at 2013 Division I National Championships; 10 All-Americans; 2 National Champions
Miami (Ohio)	2000	NCAA Division I	2009	Dropped program		#3 at 2000 National Championships; #14 at 2003 National Championships; #14 at 2005 National Championships; #7 at 2006 National Championships; #14 at 2007 National Championships; #20 at 2008 National Championships; 16 All-Americans; 2 National Champions
Minot State	2011	NAIA	2012	NCAA Division II		#30 at 2012 Division I National Championships
Mott	2003	Started in NCWA	2020	Dropped program		6 top-12 National Championship finishes; 7th at 2014 National Dual Meet Championship; 2019 Regional Dual Champions; 30 All-Americans; 5 National Champions
Navy Prep	2008	Started in NCWA	2015	No association		2008 Northeast Conference champions; #4 at 2008 National Championships; 2009 Northeast Conference champions; #3 at 2009 National Championships; 2010 Northeast Conference champions; #5 at 2010 National Championships; #7 at 2011 National Dual Meet Championship; 2011 Northeast Conference champions; #8 at 2011 Division I National Championships; #6 at 2012 Division I National Championships; #6 at 2013 Division I National Championships; #6 at 2014 Division I National Championships; #6 at 2015 Division I National Championships; 42 All-Americans; 10 National Champions; Vast majority of student-athletes transfer to United States Naval Academy (Navy); 3x NCAA Division I National Qualifier Jadaen Bernstein was the 2014 174 lb National Champion for Naval Academy Preparatory School; 2016 NCAA Division I National Qualifier Nicholas Gil was the 2015 149 lb National Champion for Naval Academy Preparatory School
Nevada	2001	Program restarted in the NCWA	2003	Program dropped		#2 at 2002 National Championships; 2003 National Champions; 17 All-Americans; 3 National Champions
Newman	2007	NAIA	2008	NCAA Division II		#17 at 2007 National Championships; 2009 Southwest Conference champions; #2 at 2008 National Championships; 11 All-Americans; 1 National Champion
Northampton	2004	Started in NCWA	2010	Program dropped	NCAA Division II	#9 at 2004 National Championships; #13 at 2005 National Championships; #5 at 2006 National Championships; 2007 Northeast Conference champions; #4 at 2007 National Championships; #10 at 2008 National Championships; #9 at 2009 National Championships; #14 at 2010 National Championships; 21 All-Americans; 3 National Champions
Notre Dame College	2012	NAIA	2013	NCAA Division II		2012 Great Lakes Conference champions; 2012 Division I National Champions; 12 All-Americans; 3 National Champions
Penn College	2010	Started in NCWA	2014	NCAA Division III		#26 at 2011 Division I National Championships; #17 at 2012 Division I National Championships; #20 at 2013 Division I National Championships; #24 at 2014 Division I National Championships; 3 All-Americans
Pensacola Christian	1998	NCCAA	2006	Program dropped		1999 Southeast Conference champions; 1999 National Champions; 2000 Southeast Conference champions; 2000 National Champions; 2001 Southeast Conference champions; #3 at 2001 National Championships; 2002 Southeast Conference champions; #5 at 2002 National Championships; #5 at 2003 National Championships; #8 at 2005 National Championships; 2006 Southeast Conference champions; #3 at 2006 National Championships; 39 All-Americans; 9 National Champions; Coached by Olympians David Hazewinkel and Jim Hazewinkel from 1998 to 2006.
Rochester	2014	NJCAA	2015	NJCAA	NAIA	2015 NCWA Great Plains Conference champions; #3 at 2015 Division I National Championships; 8 All-Americans
St. Andrews	2011	NCAA Division II	2012	NAIA		#24 at 2012 Division I National Championships; 2 All-Americans
Schreiner	2018	Started in NCWA	2021	NCAA Division III		2x Southwest Conference champions (2019, 2020); #12 at 2019 Division I National Championships; 5th at 2020 National Dual Meet Championship; #6 at 2020 Division I National Championships; 2 All-Americans; 1 National Champions
Shorter	2013	NAIA	2014	NCAA Division II	Program dropped	#2 at 2014 National Dual Meet Championship; 2014 Southeast Conference champions; #3 at 2014 National Championships; 6 All-Americans; 2 National Champions
Simon Fraser	2011	NAIA	2012	NCAA Division II		#5 at 2012 Division I National Championships; 6 All-Americans
Southern Illinois Edwardsville	2009	NCAA Division II	2012	NCAA Division I		#20 at 2009 National Championships; 2010 North Central Conference Co-Champions; #3 at 2010 National Championships; #4 at 2011 Division I National Championships; #7 at 2012 Division I National Championships; 18 All-Americans; 3 National Champions
Southern Virginia	2000	Started in the NCWA	2014	NCAA Division III		16 All-Americans; 4 National Champions
Valley Forge Military	1998	Started in NCWA	2009	NJCAA	Program dropped	#10 at 1998 National Championships; #13 at 1999 National Championships; #24 at 2000 National Championships; #17 at 2001 National Championships; #35 at 2005 National Championships; #54 at 2006 National Championships; #19 at 2007 National Championships; #57 at 2008 National Championships; 8 All-American; 3 National Champions

==== Men's GoGreco ====
Institution	Year Entered NCWA	Conference	All-Americans and National Champions	Team Championships	Notes
North Texas	2017	Southwest	25 All-Americans; 7 National Champions	3x GoGreco National Champions (2017-2019); Most individual National Champions; Most All-Americans	Inaugural GoGreco National Champions. Coached by Andre Metzger
Richland	2017	Southwest	14 All-Americans; 2 National Champions	3x GoGreco National Runner-ups (2017-2019)	Hosted inaugural GoGreco National Championships in 2017. Coached by Bill Neal
USC	2017	West Coast	4 All-Americans; 2 National Champions		
Texas State	2017	Southwest	3 All-Americans; 3 National Champions		

==== Women's folkstyle ====
Institution	Year Entered NCWWA	Previous Association	Year Left NCWWA	Next Association	Current Association	Notes
Lindenwood - Belleville	2011	Started in NCWA	2013	WCWA	NCAA	#3 at 2012 National Championships; #2 at 2013 National Championships; 6 All-Americans; 4 National Champions
Maine	2014	Started in NCWA	2019	Program dropped		4 top-10 finishes at National Championships; #3 at 2018 National Championships; 6 All-Americans; 4 National Champions; Samantha Frank only 4x National Champion and Most Outstanding Wrestler in NCWA/NCWWA history
UMass	2012	Started in NCWA	2018	Active - No Athletes Currently Competing		5 All-Americans; 1 National Champion
Michigan – Dearborn	2015	Started in NCWA	2019	Program dropped		4 All-Americans; 4 National Champions; 3 top-10 finishes at National Championships; Marina Goocher the second 4x National Champion in NCWA/NCWWA history
Midland	2015	WCWA	2016	WCWA		#10 at 2016 National Championships
Ottawa	2014	Started in NCWA	2017	WCWA		#2 at 2015 National Championships; #2 at 2016 National Championships; #2 at 2017 National Championships; 22 All-Americans; 3 National Champions
Pacific	2007	Started in NCWA	2012	WCWA	NCAA	No team score recorded at 2008 National Championships, but accumulated individual points would have made them the runner-up; #2 at 2009 National Championships; #3 at 2010 National Championships; #2 at 2012 National Championships; 11 All-Americans; 2 National Champions
San Jose State	2010	Started in NCWA	2013	Program dropped		#7 at 2011 National Championships; #6 at 2012 National Championships; #3 at 2013 National Championships; 5 All-Americans; 1 National Champion; Coached by Robert Redman
Schreiner	2018	Started in NCWA	2021	NCAA Division III		#2 at 2019 National Championships; 2020 National Dual Meet Champions; 2020 National Champions; 16 All-Americans; 4 National Champions
Simon Fraser	2007	WCWA (competed in both)	2009	WCWA		No team score recorded at 2008 National Championships, but accumulated individual points would have made them the winner; #3 at 2009 National Championships; 8 All-Americans; 7 National Champions
South Florida	2010	Started in NCWA	2016	Program dropped		Five top-10 finishes at National Championships; Jasmine Grant first 4x NCWWA All-American; 7 All-Americans; 1 National Champion1
Southwestern Oregon	2010	Started in NCWA	2018	WCWA	NJCAA	#2 at 2011 National Championships; #1 at 2012 National Championships; #1 at 2013 National Championships; #1 at 2014 National Championships; #1 at 2015 National Championships; #1 at 2016 National Championships; #1 at 2017 National Championships; #1 at 2018 National Championships; 64 All-Americans; 30 National Champions
Yakima Valley	2008	Started in NCWA	2011	WCWA		#1 at 2009 National Championships; #1 at 2010 National Championships; #1 at 2011 National Championships; 9 All-Americans; 5 National Champions

== Advantages of the NCWA ==
- The organization and its members encourage wrestlers to compete no matter what the experience level.
- A good format for the average wrestlers who still have the passion to compete in the sport they love.
- Several NCWA members have gone on to become scholarship athletes at NCAA and NAIA institutions.
- Several NCWA All-Americans have gone on to be NCAA All-Americans.
- Several NCWA coaches have gone on to be NCAA, NAIA, NJCAA coaches.
- Gives smaller colleges and universities the opportunity to begin a collegiate-level program.
- Programs can be established and developed quickly without the traditional limitations of an NCAA team.
- Funding of teams is open to many sources not allowable under NCAA rule.
- Programs currently transitioning from one association to another (NCAA, NAIA, NJCAA, USCAA, NCCAA) have a place to compete in the post-season during their transitional period.
- The NCWA is always looking to implement new rules and functions of collegiate, such as instant replay for officials and the Collegiate Cup.
- The student-athletes are and have to be extremely hands-on in all of the team's operations and decision-making; this type of leadership training can prepare the student-athlete for their future careers whether in wrestling or not.
- The NCWA is a governing body of wrestling and can make their own decisions as far as rules, procedures, and competition. This is evident with advances such as the GoGreco Program, instant replay and challenges in matches, and the Collegiate Cup championship format.
- Talented high school student-athletes who were passed over by NCAA, NAIA, and NJCAA schools have a chance to compete at an NCWA program.
- Talented high school student-athletes who transferred out of an NCAA/NAIA/NJCAA school have a second chance to wrestle in college.
- Some U.S. states do not have NCAA, NAIA, and/or NJCAA teams with wrestling, but do have at least one NCWA wrestling program, which can make it easier for high school athletes to decide where they want to wrestle in college in terms of financial costs.
- The NCWA allows student-athletes four total seasons of eligibility with no time frame to complete them unlike the NCAA, who requires student-athletes to complete four seasons of eligibility in five years of enrollment starting from the student's first year at the school, and the NJCAA, requires student-athletes to complete two seasons of eligibility in three years of enrollment starting from the student's first year at the school.

=== Similarities with NCAA, NAIA, NJCAA, CCCAA, and WCWA ===
- Collegiate weight classes are used (125, 133, 141, 149, 157, 165, 174, 184, 197, 285 lbs).
- All meets and tournaments use NCAA rules and procedures.
- All conferences host a Conference championships tournament with a specific allotment of automatic qualifiers based on placement finish in the Conference championships.
- Like the NAIA, a school can enter two wrestlers in the same weight class at the Conference and National Championships (if they both qualify for the latter); one is deemed the scorer and the other the non-scorer (no advancement, match, or placement points are awarded to this wrestler).
- Like the NAIA, the NCWA allows a student-athlete four total seasons of eligibility regardless of time frame. The NCAA require students to complete their four seasons of eligibility in five years starting from the student's first year of competition (barring a sixth-year grant for hardship). Athletes previously competing for an NCAA, NJCAA, or CCCAA program that transfer to the NCWA will still have the remaining number of eligible seasons without the previous time frame.
- Like the WCWA, schools traditionally competing in the NCAA, NAIA, NJCAA, or CCCAA can all compete against one another.

=== Differences with NCAA, NAIA, NJCAA, CCCAA, and WCWA ===
As mentioned before, the NCWA allows many types of funding to its wrestling programs that might not be allowed by the NCAA. This can allow the wrestling team to grow at its own rate.

==== 235 lb weight class ====
The NCWA is the only association with collegiate wrestling to offer an 11th weight class: 235 lbs. There are a number of benefits from this:

- This weight class bridges the weight gap between the 197 lb and 285 lb weight classes, the biggest weight disparity among any two weight classes.
- College wrestlers who wrestled in the 195 or 220 lb weight classes in high school might find this easier to compete in than having to wrestle at 197 lbs or 285 lbs.
- Schools who have two or more prominent athletes in the 197 and/or 285 lb weight classes can now give their athletes another chance to succeed individually and earn team points.
- Another weight class leads to higher team scores at tournaments.
- The 11th weight class can often be used as a tiebreaker as the first criterion of "Number of Matches Won" in dual meet settings.

==== Collegiate Cup championship Series ====
Starting in the 2013–2014 season, the National Championships in March and the Collegiate Cup Duals (previously known as the National Dual Meet Championship) directly related to each other in a team's point total. A team's finish at the Collegiate Cup Duals transferred to additional points being awarded at the National Championships.

The National Wrestling Coaches Association (or "NWCA") have a National Duals tournament for NCAA Division I, Division II, Division III, NAIA, NJCAA, and NCWA teams, but all do not tie into their respective National Championships point totals. Penn State University (NCAA D-I) won four straight National Championships from 2011 to 2014 – without ever competing in the NCAA D-I entry of the National Duals. The NCWA's National Championship Series is the first of any of the college divisions to have a true champion that is indicative of both its team's as well as its individuals' success.

==== GoGreco Program ====
Starting in 2016, the NCWA launched the GoGreco Program with USA Wrestling. While USA Wrestling's Freestyle and Greco-Roman season and procedures are separate from the wrestling teams and individuals that participate in them, the NCWA owns and operates the GoGreco Program within their domain and directly controls and promotes another wrestling opportunity. This is the first collegiate-level Greco-Roman wrestling national championship. The inaugural championships will take place on June 3, 2017, in Dallas, Texas on the campus of Richland College.

The first tournament, the Texas GoGreco Championships, took place on Saturday, May 6, 2017, at Richland College. The University of North Texas won the tournament with six of seven wrestlers winning in the finals. Richland College and University of Houston–Downtown finished second and third, respectively.

==== Women's Folkstyle Wrestling ====
Whereas the WCWA has athletes compete in freestyle, the NCWA has its women's division compete in collegiate folkstyle wrestling. There are a number of teams that compete in both the WCWA and NCWA to give their athletes more competitive opportunity.

== National Events ==
The NCWA sponsors nine types national events:

1. The Champions Challenge
2. The NCWA National Duals
3. Regional Duals Championship
4. Conference championships
5. Recruit Me High School Wrestling Combine
6. National Collegiate Wrestling Championships
7. The Women's Collegiate Wrestling Championships
8. GoGreco National Championships
9. The Vision Forum

=== Champions Challenge ===
From 2010 to 2011, the Champions Challenge was formed by the NAIA and NCWA to bring more highlight matches to the wrestling community by pitting NAIA All-Stars against NCWA All-Stars at each weight class in a dual meet (except for 235 lbs since the NAIA does not recognize that weight class in competition). The All-Stars were usually the highest returning All-American at each weight class barring injury; the coaching staffs were one or two coaches for each school represented in the dual. The NCAA Division II is slated to join in the next event.

Champions Challenge series history
Year	Host city (Host location)	Dual Meet				Series Record (Streak)
Year	Host city (Host location)	Winner	Points	Runner-up	Points	Series Record (Streak)
2010	Orlando, Florida (University of Central Florida)	NAIA^{(1/2)}	39	NCWA	3	NAIA 1-0 (1-0)
2011	Orlando, Florida (University of Central Florida)	NAIA^{(2/2)}	23	NCWA	15	NAIA 2-0 (2-0)

=== National Dual Meet Championship ===
In 2008, the NCWA approved the National Dual Meet Championship where the top teams in the country would compete against one another to crown a true team champion starting in 2009. No other association had an official dual-based team champion at the time and that is still the case except in the NCWA. The current structure has 24 teams competing in a bracketed format down to 24 places.

In its thirteenth season, the NCWA hosted its first National Dual Meet Championship. Whereas the National Championships focuses more on individual success and teams can depend on one or a few exceptional wrestlers, the National Duals highlights teams with solid line-ups and good wrestlers at each weight class. It is common for teams that win or place highly in the National Duals to do so at the National Championships later. The National Duals usually take place in late January before the National Championships.

Starting in the 2013–2014 season, two changes took place: 1) the National Dual Meet Championship was now renamed as the Collegiate Cup Duals and 2) a team's finish at the Collegiate Cup Duals would earn it a certain number of team points at the National Championships and aid them in winning it. Two major reasons for this change were to 1) encourage more teams to want to wrestle in the Collegiate Cup Duals and, 2) while still recognizing up to two different champions at the two different tournaments, one team could be determined as the best true overall team and individual wrestling champion that year.

During the 2017 Vision Forum, the NCWA ruled that the National Dual Meet Championship will be held on the eastern side of the United States during even-numbered years and on the western side of the United States during odd-numbered years.

Starting with the 2019-2020 season, the NCWA would have a women's division of the National Dual Meet Championship. Previously, the National Dual Meet Championship would host some individual matches, dual meets, and/or an "All Star" event for women's wrestlers and teams invited, but this would be the first formal women's division to take place.

NCWA National Dual Meet Championships series history
Year	Host city (Host location)	Finals match				Notes
Year	Host city (Host location)	Winner	Points	Runner-up	Points	Notes
2009	Murfreesboro, Tennessee (Middle Tennessee State University)	Grand Valley^{(1/1)}	33	Central Florida	18	Inaugural event.
2010	Shelbyville, Tennessee (Middle Tennessee State University and University of Georgia)	Marion Military^{(1/1)}	27	Apprentice	15	
2011	Dalton, Georgia (Northwest Georgia Trade and Convention Center)	California Baptist ^{(1/1)}	42	Central Florida	4	First team to win event while in transition to another association.
2012	Dalton, Georgia (Northwest Georgia Trade and Convention Center)	Liberty ^{(1/6)}	25	Lindenwood	15	
2013	Dalton, Georgia (Northwest Georgia Trade and Convention Center)	Lindenwood ^{(1/1)}	30	Liberty	19	First time the event was a rematch of the previous year's finals.
2014	Dalton, Georgia (Northwest Georgia Trade and Convention Center)	Grand Canyon^{(1/1)}	23	Shorter	19	First time the event became the Collegiate Cup Duals and team points were a factor for the overall Collegiate Cup championship.
2015	Dalton, Georgia (Northwest Georgia Trade and Convention Center)	Liberty ^{(2/6)}	37	Apprentice	9	First team to win event more than once.
2016	Dalton, Georgia (Northwest Georgia Trade and Convention Center)	Central Florida ^{(1/1)}	32	Grand Valley State	18	
2017	Lynchburg, Virginia (Liberty University)	Emmanuel ^{(1/1)}	33	Liberty	13	
2018	Lynchburg, Virginia (Liberty University)	Liberty ^{(3/6)}	30	Emmanuel	15	
2019	Mesquite, Nevada (CasaBlanca Resort Event Center)	Liberty ^{(4/6)}	28	Apprentice	18	First school to win back-to-back titles.
2020	Lynchburg, Virginia (Liberty University)	Men's: Liberty ^{(5/6)}	43	Men's: Apprentice	13	
2020	Lynchburg, Virginia (Liberty University)	Women's: Schreiner ^{(1/1)}	48	Women's: Liberty	6	First ever Women's National Dual Meet Championship.
2021	N/A					No 2021 season took place due to the Coronavirus pandemic in the United States.
2022	Lynchburg, Virginia (Liberty University)	Men's: Liberty ^{(6/6)}	39	Men's: Apprentice	7	
2022	Lynchburg, Virginia (Liberty University)	Women's: Ottawa - Arizona ^{(1/1)}	57	Women's: Grand Canyon	0	
2023	Louisville, Kentucky (Kentucky Exposition Center)	Men's: Bellarmine ^{(1/2)}	29	Men's: Liberty	21	NWCA National Dual Meet Championship - NCWA Division
2024	Cedar Falls, Iowa (University of Northern Iowa)	Men's: Bellarmine ^{(1/2)}	44	Men's: Liberty	12	NWCA National Dual Meet Championship - NCWA Division
2024	Hoquiam, Washington (Hoquiam High School)	Women's: Grays Harbor ^{(1/1)}	36	Women's: Ottawa - Arizona	29	
2025	Newport News, Virginia (Apprentice School)	Men's: Life^{(1/1)}	32	Men's: Apprentice School	21	
2025	St. George, Utah (Utah Tech University)	Women's: Washington State^{(1/1)}	36	Utah Tech	21	
2026	St. George, Utah (Utah Tech University)	Men's: Tarleton State^{(1/1)}	39	Men's: Utah Tech	16	
2026	St. George, Utah (Utah Tech University)	Women's: Tarleton State^{(1/1)}	57	Utah Tech	6	

==== 6:12 Project ====
The 6:12 Project is a community outreach program created by the NCWA for its wrestlers, coaches, officials, volunteers, and staff to help the city hosting the NCWA National Duals. NCWA wrestling programs serve food to those in need and hold canned and non-perishable food drives. They later donate those goods, as well as clothes (especially jackets), to one of the city's organizations.

The name "6:12 Project" comes from the Biblical quote Ephesians chapter 6, verse 12 from the New Testament:

"For we do not wrestle against flesh and blood, but against principalities, against power, against the rulers of the darkness of this age, against spiritual hosts of wickedness in the heavenly places."

The first 6:12 Project took place at the 2012 National Duals in Dalton, Georgia and repeated for the 2013 and 2014 events which were also held in Dalton. It is scheduled to continue at the 2015 Collegiate Cup Duals in Dalton again.

=== NCWA Regional Duals Championship ===
Initially created as the Western Regional Duals, this event was created in order to give teams in the western and central part of North America the opportunity to compete in a national dual meet event like the National Dual Meet Championship.

Historically, the National Dual Meet Championship has been hosted on the eastern side of the United States in Georgia, Tennessee, or Virginia. When the Collegiate Cup was passed in 2013, questions and concerns were raised as to whether teams closer to the physical location of the National Dual Meet Championship would have an unfair competitive advantage in terms of championship points calculated for the Collegiate Cup series.

At the 2017 Vision Forum, the NCWA passed a resolution stating that in even-numbered years the National Duals would take place on the eastern side and the Regional Duals on the western side; in odd-numbered years, the National Duals would take place at a western location and the Regional Duals an eastern location.

Starting in the 2022-2023 season with the NCWA accepting the NWCA's offer to compete in the NCWA division of the NWCA Duals, the NCWA would host up to two Regional Duals Championship events - one designated in the East and/or one in the West.

Regional Duals Championship series history
Year	Host city (Host location)	Finals match				Notes
Year	Host city (Host location)	Winner	Points	Runner-up	Points	Notes
2017	St. George, Utah (Dixie State University)	Grays Harbor ^{(1/1)}	33	BYU	23	Inaugural event.
2018	Las Vegas, Nevada (Western High School)	Brigham Young^{(1/1)}	38	Colorado State	10	First time a team appeared in consecutive finals matches.
2019	Akron, Ohio (Springfield High School)	Mott^{(1/1)}	38	East Carolina	18James Madison University	First Regional Dual Championship to take place in the East.
2020	Surprise, Arizona (Ottawa University Surprise)	UNLV^{(1/1)}	39	Wayne State	24	Round-robin format was used.
2021	N/A					No 2021 season took place due to the Coronavirus pandemic in the United States.
2022	N/A					
2023	Surprise, Arizona (Ottawa University)	Washington State^{(1/1)}	39	Grays Harbor	18	Western Regional Duals. Round-robin format was used.
2023	Harrisonburg, Virginia (James Madison University)	Springfield Tech^{(1/1)}	40	Virginia Tech (NCWA)	6	Eastern Regional Duals. Round-robin format was used.
2024	Hoquiam, Washington (Hoquiam High School)	Menlo College (NCWA)^{(1/1)}	53	Colorado State	9	Western Regional Duals. Round-robin format was used.

=== Conference championships ===
Following the inaugural season, the NCWA approved a five-conference format where wrestlers would compete for advancement into the National Championships as well as seeding if they qualified. The number of conferences has fluctuated throughout the years including reaching a record high of 9 and currently set at 8. Additionally, some conferences have been renamed over the years. These conferences are geographically-based and are similar to the National Championships tournament where Division I and II programs wrestle in one bracket, but differ in that team scores are kept as one tournament (unlike the National Championships having a Division I team score and Division II team score).

==== 1998 ====
Year	Conferences
1998	No conferences

==== 1999-2001 ====
Year	Northeastern	Northern	Southeastern	Southwestern	Western
1999	Apprentice	No tournament	Pensacola Christian	Texas A&M	No tournament
2000	Williamson		Pensacola Christian	Kansas	No tournament
2001	Delaware	Grand Valley State	Pensacola Christian	Kansas State	No tournament

==== 2002 ====
Year	Northeast	Northern	Northwestern	Southeastern	Southwestern
2002	Apprentice	Grand Valley State	Nevada	Pensacola Christian	Kansas State

==== 2003 ====
Year	North Central	Northeast	Northwest	Southeast	Southwest	West
2003	Grand Valley State	Apprentice	No tournament	Central Florida	Kansas State	Nevada

==== 2004-2005 ====
Year	Mid-Atlantic	North Central	Northeast	Northwest	Southeast	Southwest	West
2004	Apprentice	Grand Valley State	New Hampshire	No tournament	Central Florida	Texas Tech	Cal - Davis
2005	Apprentice	Grand Valley State	New Hampshire	No tournament	Central Florida	Kansas State	San Jose State

==== 2006-2009 ====
Year	Mid-Atlantic	North Central	Northeast	Northwest	Southeast	Southwest	West Coast
2006	Apprentice	Grand Valley State	New Hampshire	No tournament	Pensacola Christian	Colorado State	No tournament
2007	Apprentice	Grand Valley State	New Hampshire	No tournament	Central Florida	Colorado State	San Jose State
2008	Apprentice	Grand Valley State	Northampton	No tournament	Central Florida	Newman	San Jose State
2009	Apprentice	Grand Valley State	Navy Prep	No tournament	Marion Military	Kansas State	San Jose State

==== 2010-2012 ====
Year	Mid-Atlantic	Mid-East	North Central	Northeast	Southeast	Southwest	West Coast
2010	Apprentice	West Chester	Southern Illinois - Edwardsville	Navy Prep	Central Florida	Colorado State	San Jose State
2011	Apprentice	West Chester	Southern Illinois - Edwardsville	Navy Prep	Central Florida	Northwest Missouri State	Cal Baptist
2012	Liberty	West Chester	Notre Dame	New Hampshire	Marion Military	Northwest Missouri State	Cal Baptist

==== 2013-2018 ====
Year	Great Lakes	Great Plains	Mid-Atlantic	Mid-East	Northeast	Northwest	Southeast	Southwest	West Coast
2013	McKendree		Liberty						Cal Baptist
2014	Grand Valley State	Air Force Prep	Liberty	Maryland - Baltimore County	Alfred State		Shorter		Grand Canyon
2015	Grand Valley State	Rochester	Liberty	Penn State - DuBois			Central Florida	Texas - Arlington	Glendale
2016	Grand Valley State	Wayne State	Liberty	Penn State - DuBois	Alfred State		Emmanuel		Arizona
2017	Grand Valley State	Iowa State (NCWA)	Liberty	Penn State (NCWA)	Springfield Tech	Grays Harbor	Emmanuel	Texas A&M	Brigham Young
2018	Grand Valley State	Colorado State	Liberty	Maryland - Baltimore County	Springfield Tech	Grays Harbor	Emmanuel	Richland	Brigham Young

==== 2019-2022 ====
Year	Great Lakes	Mid-Atlantic	Mid-East	Northeast	Northwest	Southeast	Southwest	West Coast
2019	Mott	Liberty	West Chester	Springfield Tech	Grays Harbor	Central Florida	Schreiner	Nevada - Las Vegas
2020	Akron	Liberty	Penn State - Mont Alto	Springfield Tech	Grays Harbor	Central Florida	Schreiner	Nevada - Las Vegas
2021	No 2021 season took place due to the Coronavirus pandemic in the United States.							
2022	Grand Valley State	Liberty	Penn State (NCWA)	Springfield Tech	Grays Harbor	Central Florida	Texas A&M	Ottawa - Arizona

==== 2023-present ====
Year	Great Lakes	Mid-Atlantic	Mid-East	Northeast	Northwest	Puerto Rico	Southeast	Southwest	West Coast
2023	Grand Valley State	Liberty	Rowan	Springfield Tech	Grays Harbor	Puerto Rico - Mayagüez	Central Florida	Texas A&M	Ottawa - Arizona
2024	Bellarmine	Liberty	Rutgers (NCWA)	Springfield Tech	Washington State	Puerto Rico - Mayagüez	Central Florida	Lindenwood	UNLV
2025	Thomas More	Apprentice	Slippery Rock	Springfield Tech	Washington State			Tarleton State	Menlo

=== "Recruit Me" High School Wrestling Combine ===
The day before competition starts at the National Championships, the NCWA hosts a wrestling combine for athletes to showcase their talents to observing college coaches. Most athletes are high school student-athletes which is the primary focus, however students at a post-secondary institution without a wrestling program may also attend. The event also allows students to ask questions about collegiate competition to college coaches.

=== Men's Collegiate Wrestling Championships ===
The first major event the NCWA hosted took place in 1998 was the inaugural National Championships with 26 teams in one division in the 10 then-standard weight classes. Since then, the event has grown to include approximately 340 qualifiers among 150+ teams within the 11 NCWA weight classes where two champions are crowned (Division I and Division II).

Here, individuals are recognized for their outstanding individual achievement. They can earn team points (unless they are the non-scorer on their team) by advancing through the tournament, scoring bonus points in matches, and placing in the top 8. Teams accumulate points from all of their scoring wrestlers. The National Championships have traditionally been held in the middle of March. Division I and Division II teams compete in one bracketed tournament where the overall team points are separated at the end between the two.

In 1998, the NCWA approved an eleventh weight class, the 235 lb weight class.

In 2007, the NCWA approved All-American status for wrestlers placing in top 8. Previously, only the top 6 wrestlers in each weight class were named All-Americans.

In 2010, the NCWA approved a two-division classification system - the Division I level composed of established teams meeting specific criteria and the Division II tier where up-start teams as well as teams aiming to join Division I would compete.

Since the 2013–2014 season when the Collegiate Cup championship series was passed, teams' National Championships points are added with their National Dual Meet Championship finish points to determine the overall team champion.

In 2020, multiple teams and individual wrestlers withdrew from the tournament before or during the tournament due to the COVID-19 pandemic.

National championships series history
Year	Host city (Host location)	Team championship				Most Outstanding Wrestler (Team)
Year	Host city (Host location)	Winner	Points	Runner-up	Points	Most Outstanding Wrestler (Team)
1998	Dallas, Texas (Richland College)	Yale^{(1/1)}	114.0	Georgia	99.0	Alex Tucker (Georgia)
1999	Dallas, Texas (Richland College)	Pensacola Christian^{(1/2)}	196.0	Apprentice	167.5	Justin Bellman (Valley Forge Military)
2000	Dallas, Texas (Richland College)	Pensacola Christian^{(2/2)}	110.0	Apprentice	97.5	Mike Collins (Delaware)
2001	Dallas, Texas (Richland College)	Grand Valley State^{(1/5)}	196.0	Delaware	112.5	Nate Thoreson (Pensacola Christian)
2002	Easton, Pennsylvania (Lafayette College)	Grand Valley State^{(2/5)}	199.5	Nevada	165.0	Travis Cross (Douglas)
2003	Easton, Pennsylvania (Lafayette College)	Nevada^{(1/1)}	154.5	Apprentice	138.0	Jason Meister (Baptist Bible)
2004	Dallas, Texas (University of Texas at Dallas)	Central Florida^{(1/3)}	166.0	Grand Valley State	163.5	Willie Hosch (Catawba)
2005	Dallas, Texas (University of Texas at Dallas)	Central Florida ^{(2/3)}	171.0	Grand Valley State	159.0	Steve McGettrick (Pensacola Christian)
2006	Grand Rapids, Michigan (Grand Valley State University)	Grand Valley State^{(3/5)}	188.0	Apprentice	114.5	
2007	Dallas, Texas (Garland Events Center)	Grand Valley State^{(4/5)}	184.5	Central Florida	139.5	Cee-Jay Hamilton (Marion Military)
2008	Lakeland, Florida (Lakeland Center)	Grand Valley State^{(5/5)}	135.5	Newman	124.0	Adam Murray (University of Toledo)
2009	Hampton, Virginia (Hampton University)	Apprentice^{(1/1)}	118.5	Grand Valley State	109.0	Cole VonOhlen (Air Force Prep)
2010	Hampton, Virginia (Hampton University)	Central Florida^{(3/3)}	128.0	Apprentice	111.5	John Aikens (Grand Valley State)
2011	Macon, Georgia (Mercer University)	Division I: California Baptist^{(1/2)} Division II: Northwest Missouri State^{(1/1)}	156.5; 45.0	Division I: Grand Valley State; Division II: Cincinnati	121.0; 33.0	Herman Gillum (Mott)
2012	Daytona Beach, Florida (Ocean Center)	Division I: Notre Dame College ^{(1/1)} Division II: Wichita State^{(1/1)}	168.0; 57.5	Division I: California Baptist; Division II: Northwest Missouri State	161.0; 27.0	Matthew Miller (Navy Prep)
2013	Allen, Texas (Allen Event Center)	Division I: California Baptist^{(2/2)} Division II: Massachusetts Institute of Technology^{(1/1)}	145.5; 50.5	Division I: McKendree; Division II: South Carolina	137.0; 41.0	
2014	Allen, Texas (Allen Event Center)	Division I: Grand Canyon ^{(1/1)} Division II: Florida Gulf Coast^{(1/1)}	254.5; 67.5	Division I: Liberty; Division II: Massachusetts Institute of Technology	171.5; 60.5	Ryan Diehl (Liberty)
2015	Allen, Texas (Allen Event Center)	Division I: Liberty ^{(1/4)} Division II: Washington State^{(1/1)}	194.0; 66.5	Division I: Middle Tennessee State; Division II: Montana Western	127.5; 59.5	Ryan Diehl (Liberty)
2016	Kissimmee, Florida (Silver Spurs Arena)	Division I: Emmanuel^{(1/2)} Division II: Florida^{(1/1)}	213.0; 72.0	Division I: Central Florida; Division II:	191.0; 59.5	Zachary Cooper (Grand Valley State)
2017	Allen, Texas (Allen Event Center)	Division I: Emmanuel^{(2/2)} Division II: Maine^{(1/1)}	233.5; 61.5	Division I: Liberty; Division II: Connecticut	155.5; 57.0	
2018	Allen, Texas (Allen Event Center)	Division I: Liberty^{(2/4)} Division II: Penn State (NCWA)^{(1/3)}	157.0; 50.0	Division I: Apprentice; Division II: Akron	156.5; 48.0	George Van Valen (Alfred State)
2019	Allen, Texas (Allen Event Center)	Division I: Liberty^{(3/4)} Division II: Penn State (NCWA)^{(2/3)}	201.5; 62.0	Division I: Apprentice; Division II: Connecticut	164.0; 61.0	Ty'Rae Carter (Texas A&M)
2020	Allen, Texas (Allen Event Center)	Division I: Liberty^{(4/4)} Division II: East Carolina^{(2/2)}	228.0; 96.0	Division I: Grays Harbor; Division II: Penn State (NCWA)	141.0; 71.5	Ty'Rae Carter (Texas A&M)
2021	No 2021 season took place due to the Coronavirus pandemic in the United States.					
2022	Allen, Texas (Credit Union of Texas Event Center)	Division I: Liberty^{(5/5)} Division II: Penn State (NCWA)^{(3/3)}	229.0; 106.0	Division I: Apprentice; Division II: Ohio State (NCWA)	133.5; 96.0	Ty'Rae Carter (Texas A&M)
2023	San Juan, Puerto Rico (Puerto Rico Convention Center)	Division I: Bellarmine^{(1/2)} Division II: Ohio State State (NCWA)^{(1/1)}	206.5; 94.0	Division I: Liberty; Division II: Rowan	189.5; 63.0	Devan Hendricks (Bellarmine)
2024	Shreveport, Louisiana (Brookshire Grocery Arena)	Division I: Bellarmine^{(2/2)} Division II: West Chester^{(1/1)}	245.5; 57.5	Division I: Liberty; Division II: Ohio State (NCWA)	182.0; 56.0	
2025	Shreveport, Louisiana (Brookshire Grocery Arena)	Division I: Menlo^{(1/2)} Division II: Life^{(1/2)}	214.5; 111.5	Division I: Apprentice; Division II: Ohio State (NCWA)	187.5; 67.5	Bruno Alves (Apprentice)
2026	Shreveport, Louisiana (Brookshire Grocery Arena)	Division I: Menlo^{(2/2)} Division II: Life^{(2/2)}	235.5; 196	Division I: Tarleton State; Division II: Menlo (NCWA)	164; 76.5	Kanaipono Tapia (Menlo)

=== Women's Collegiate Wrestling Championships ===
The first NCWA-sponsored Women's Collegiate Wrestling Championships took place at the 2008 National Championships. The NCWA sponsored this event under their new banner organization, the National Collegiate Women's Wrestling Association (NCWWA). The weight classes have been designed to closely resemble most female athletes' natural weight ranges as well as let programs that also compete in women's collegiate freestyle to acclimate to folkstyle competition. Whereas before matches were done using freestyle rules, as was the norm with associations like the WCWA, the NCWWA uses collegiate/folkstyle rules like in the NCWA, NCAA, NAIA, and NJCAA.

Team scores were unofficial at the inaugural 2008 tournament, and Simon Fraser University finished with the most team points. Bo Icalia and Josh White are tied for head coaches to have won the most titles; Icalia won the 2010 and 2011 titles as head coach of Yakima Valley Community College and the 2012 and 2013 titles as head coach of Southwestern Oregon Community College. White has won the 2014, 2015, 2016, and 2017 titles all with Southwestern Oregon Community College.

The top 3 wrestlers in each weight class are recognized as All-Americans. University of South Florida's Jasmine Grant is the NCWWA's first and only 4x All-American (2011–2014) so far. University of Maine's Samantha Frank has won 3 national titles going into the 2017–2018 season.

The Women's College Wrestling Championships has traditionally been dominated by northern and northwestern teams.

In 2020, multiple teams and individual wrestlers withdrew from the tournament before or after it had started in response to the COVID-19 pandemic.

Women's Collegiate National Championships series history
Year	Host city (Host location)	Team championship				Most Outstanding Wrestler (Team)
Year	Host city (Host location)	Winner	Points	Runner-up	Points	Most Outstanding Wrestler (Team)
2008	Lakeland, Florida (Lakeland Center)	Simon Fraser (unofficial)		Pacific	50.0	
2009	Hampton, Virginia (Hampton University)	Yakima Valley	73.0	Simon Fraser	58.0	Ashlee Phy (Yakima Valley)
2010	Hampton, Virginia (Hampton University)	Yakima Valley		Mercer		
2011	Macon, Georgia (Mercer University)	Yakima Valley	124.0	Mercer	45.0	
2012	Daytona Beach, Florida (Ocean Center)	Southwestern Oregon	83.5	Pacific	61.5	Erica Poe (Southwestern Oregon)
2013	Allen, Texas (Allen Event Center)	Southwestern Oregon	100.0	Lindenwood – Belleville	53.0	Sonia Beri (San Jose)
2014	Allen, Texas (Allen Event Center)	Southwestern Oregon	77.0	West Chester	31.0	
2015	Allen, Texas (Allen Event Center)	Southwestern Oregon	128.0	Ottawa	98.0	Samantha Frank (Maine)
2016	Kissimmee, Florida (Silver Spurs Arena)	Southwestern Oregon	127.0	Ottawa	83.5	Samantha Frank (Maine)
2017	Allen, Texas (Allen Event Center)	Southwestern Oregon	97.5	Ottawa	69.5	Samantha Frank (Maine)
2018	Allen, Texas (Allen Event Center)	Southwestern Oregon	134.0	Midland	52.5	Samantha Frank (Maine)
2019	Allen, Texas (Allen Event Center)	Grays Harbor	65.5	Schreiner	63.0	
2020	Allen, Texas (Allen Event Center)	Schreiner	170.5	Umpqua	119.5	Cendall Manley (Liberty)
2021	No 2021 season took place due to the Coronavirus pandemic in the United States.					
2022	Allen, Texas (Credit Union of Texas Event Center)	Big Bend	115.5	Ottawa - Arizona	73.5	
2023	San Juan, Puerto Rico (Puerto Rico Convention Center)	Ottawa - Arizona	120.0	Grays Harbor	80.0	Veloria Pannell (MIT)
2024	Shreveport, Louisiana (Brookshire Grocery Arena)	Grays Harbor	158.0	Ottawa - Arizona	148.0	
2025	Shreveport, Louisiana (Brookshire Grocery Arena)	Tarleton State	126.0	Utah Tech	125.5	Paige Kalish (UCF)
2026	Shreveport, Louisiana (Brookshire Grocery Arena)	Tarleton State	215.0	Menlo	145.0	Aine Drury (Tarleton State)

=== GoGreco National Championships ===
Approved in 2016, the GoGreco Program was launched with USA Wrestling in order to improve the U.S.A.'s performance in Junior- and Senior-level Greco-Roman competition. The GoGreco season starts on the last weekend of March and concludes with the GoGreco Collegiate National Championships on the first weekend of June.

GoGreco Nationals is an open-entry event to any NCWA Member institution. NCAA, NAIA & NJCAA institutions that are not currently a member of the NCWA are encouraged to join the NCWA for the GoGreco Season and to send athletes to the Nationals. Student-athletes must maintain the same academic standards that are required of the NCWA and their member institutions in order to compete.

The inaugural championships took place on June 3, 2017, in Dallas, Texas on the campus of Richland College.

GoGreco National Championships series history
Year	Host city (Host team)	Team championship				Notes
Year	Host city (Host team)	Winner	Points	Runner-up	Points	Notes
2017	Dallas, Texas (Richland College)	North Texas^{(1/3)}	55.0	Richland	34.0	Inaugural championships
2018	Dallas, Texas (Richland College)	North Texas^{(2/3)}	49.0	Richland	37.0	Most Outstanding Wrestler: Dominic Vazquez (Toledo)
2019	Dallas, Texas (Richland College)	North Texas^{(3/3)}	83.0	Richland	42.0	
2020	No 2020 season took place due to the Coronavirus pandemic in the United States.					
2021	No 2021 season took place due to the coronavirus pandemic in the United States.					

=== Vision Forum ===
Every year since 1997, the NCWA's Vision Forum convenes during the wrestling off-season in the summer and is held at about the same location as and set a few days before the National Wrestling Coaches Association Convention. The Vision Forum focuses on the NCWA rule changes, policies, and procedures from the previous season and if any modifications need to be made or new topics need to be discussed. The 2017 Vision Forum will be held from Wednesday, August 2 to Sunday, August 6 in Daytona Beach, Florida.

Some important changes and events that have come from the Vision Forum:

- Introduction of Puerto Rico programs, Puerto Rico Conference, and first national championships held in Puerto Rico; passed in 2022
- NWCA National Dual Meet Championship to feature NCWA Division, NCWA to host both Eastern and Western Regional Dual Meet Championships; passed in 2022
- Women's division for the National Dual Meet Championship; passed in 2019
- National Duals and Regional Duals to switch between eastern- and western-based locations every year; passed in 2017
- Western Regional Duals; passed in 2016
- "Recruit Me" High School Wrestling Combine; passed in 2015
- Go Greco Initiative; passed in 2015
- Collegiate Cup National Championships Series; passed in 2013
- National Collegiate Grappling Association; passed in 2013
- Seven conferences re-aligned into nine conferences; passed in 2012
- Use of mat-side instant replay for officials; passed in 2011
- Two men's divisions - Division I and Division II; passed in 2010
- National Dual Meet Championship; passed in 2008
- Added women's division (National Collegiate Women's Wrestling Association); passed in 2007
- Addition of 7th and 8th-place finishes at National Championships into All-American finishes; passed in 2006
- First National Championships to take place outside of Texas; passed in 2001
- Addition of an 11th weight class, the 235 lb weight class; passed in 1998

== Team Championship History ==
=== Champions by year ===
NCWA Championships
Year	Host city (Host team)	Division	School	Championship format
1998	Dallas, Texas (Richland College)	Men's	Yale	national championships team score
1999	Dallas, Texas (Richland College)	Men's	Pensacola Christian	national championships team score
2000	Dallas, Texas (Richland College)	Men's	Pensacola Christian	national championships team score
2001	Dallas, Texas (Richland College)	Men's	Grand Valley State	national championships team score
2002	Easton, Pennsylvania (Lafayette College)	Men's	Grand Valley State	national championships team score
2003	Easton, Pennsylvania (Lafayette College)	Men's	Nevada	national championships team score
2004	Dallas, Texas (University of Texas at Dallas)	Men's	Central Florida	national championships team score
2005	Dallas, Texas (University of Texas at Dallas)	Men's	Central Florida	national championships team score
2006	Grand Rapids, Michigan (Grand Valley State University)	Men's	Grand Valley State	national championships team score
2007	Dallas, Texas (Garland Events Center)	Men's	Grand Valley State	national championships team score
2008	Lakeland, Florida (Lakeland Center)	Men's	Grand Valley State	national championships team score
2008	Lakeland, Florida (Lakeland Center)	Women's	Simon Fraser (unofficial)	national championships team score
2009	Hampton, Virginia (Hampton University)	Men's	Apprentice	• Men's division: National Championships team score • Women's division: National Championships team score
2009	Hampton, Virginia (Hampton University)	Women's	Yakima Valley	• Men's division: National Championships team score • Women's division: National Championships team score
2010	Hampton, Virginia (Hampton University)	Men's	Central Florida	• Men's division: National Championships team score • Women's division: National Championships team score
2010	Hampton, Virginia (Hampton University)	Women's	Yakima Valley	• Men's division: National Championships team score • Women's division: National Championships team score
2011	Macon, Georgia (Mercer University)	Men's Division I	California Baptist	• Men's division I: National Championships team score • Men's division II: National Championships team score • Women's division: National Championships team score
2011	Macon, Georgia (Mercer University)	Men's Division II	Northwest Missouri State	• Men's division I: National Championships team score • Men's division II: National Championships team score • Women's division: National Championships team score
2011	Macon, Georgia (Mercer University)	Women's	Yakima Valley	• Men's division I: National Championships team score • Men's division II: National Championships team score • Women's division: National Championships team score
2012	Daytona Beach, Florida (Ocean Center)	Men's Division I:	Notre Dame College	• Men's division I: National Championships team score • Men's division II: National Championships team score • Women's division: National Championships team score
2012	Daytona Beach, Florida (Ocean Center)	Men's Division II	Wichita State	• Men's division I: National Championships team score • Men's division II: National Championships team score • Women's division: National Championships team score
2012	Daytona Beach, Florida (Ocean Center)	Women's	Southwestern Oregon	• Men's division I: National Championships team score • Men's division II: National Championships team score • Women's division: National Championships team score
2013	Allen, Texas (Allen Event Center)	Men's Division I	California Baptist	• Men's division I: National Championships team score • Men's division II: National Championships team score • Women's division: National Championships team score
2013	Allen, Texas (Allen Event Center)	Men's Division II	Massachusetts Institute of Technology	• Men's division I: National Championships team score • Men's division II: National Championships team score • Women's division: National Championships team score
2013	Allen, Texas (Allen Event Center)	Women's	Southwestern Oregon	• Men's division I: National Championships team score • Men's division II: National Championships team score • Women's division: National Championships team score
2014	Allen, Texas (Allen Event Center)	Men's Division I	Grand Canyon	• Men's division I: Collegiate Cup scoring system • Men's division II: National Championships team score • Women's division: National Championships team score
2014	Allen, Texas (Allen Event Center)	Men's Division II	Florida Gulf Coast	• Men's division I: Collegiate Cup scoring system • Men's division II: National Championships team score • Women's division: National Championships team score
2014	Allen, Texas (Allen Event Center)	Women's	Southwestern Oregon	• Men's division I: Collegiate Cup scoring system • Men's division II: National Championships team score • Women's division: National Championships team score
2015	Allen, Texas (Allen Event Center)	Men's Division I	Liberty	• Men's division I: Collegiate Cup scoring system • Men's division II: National Championships team score • Women's division: National Championships team score
2015	Allen, Texas (Allen Event Center)	Men's Division II	Washington State	• Men's division I: Collegiate Cup scoring system • Men's division II: National Championships team score • Women's division: National Championships team score
2015	Allen, Texas (Allen Event Center)	Women's	Southwestern Oregon	• Men's division I: Collegiate Cup scoring system • Men's division II: National Championships team score • Women's division: National Championships team score
2016	Kissimmee, Florida (Silver Spurs Arena)	Men's Division I	Central Florida	• Men's division I: Collegiate Cup scoring system • Men's division II: National Championships team score • Women's division: National Championships team score
2016	Kissimmee, Florida (Silver Spurs Arena)	Men's Division II	Florida	• Men's division I: Collegiate Cup scoring system • Men's division II: National Championships team score • Women's division: National Championships team score
2016	Kissimmee, Florida (Silver Spurs Arena)	Women's	Southwestern Oregon	• Men's division I: Collegiate Cup scoring system • Men's division II: National Championships team score • Women's division: National Championships team score
2017	Allen, Texas (Allen Event Center)	Men's Division I	Emmanuel	• Men's division I: Collegiate Cup scoring system • Men's division II: National Championships team score • Women's division: National Championships team score • GoGreco: GoGreco Championships team score
2017	Allen, Texas (Allen Event Center)	Men's Division II	Maine	• Men's division I: Collegiate Cup scoring system • Men's division II: National Championships team score • Women's division: National Championships team score • GoGreco: GoGreco Championships team score
2017	Allen, Texas (Allen Event Center)	Women's	Southwestern Oregon	• Men's division I: Collegiate Cup scoring system • Men's division II: National Championships team score • Women's division: National Championships team score • GoGreco: GoGreco Championships team score
2017	Dallas, Texas (Richland College)	GoGreco	North Texas	• Men's division I: Collegiate Cup scoring system • Men's division II: National Championships team score • Women's division: National Championships team score • GoGreco: GoGreco Championships team score
2018	Allen, Texas (Allen Event Center)	Men's Division I	Liberty	• Men's division I: Collegiate Cup scoring system • Men's division II: National Championships team score • Women's division: National Championships team score • GoGreco: GoGreco Championships team score
2018	Allen, Texas (Allen Event Center)	Men's Division II	Penn State (NCWA)	• Men's division I: Collegiate Cup scoring system • Men's division II: National Championships team score • Women's division: National Championships team score • GoGreco: GoGreco Championships team score
2018	Allen, Texas (Allen Event Center)	Women's	Southwestern Oregon	• Men's division I: Collegiate Cup scoring system • Men's division II: National Championships team score • Women's division: National Championships team score • GoGreco: GoGreco Championships team score
2018	Dallas, Texas (Richland College)	GoGreco	North Texas	• Men's division I: Collegiate Cup scoring system • Men's division II: National Championships team score • Women's division: National Championships team score • GoGreco: GoGreco Championships team score
2019	Allen, Texas (Allen Event Center)	Men's Division I	Liberty	• Men's division I: Collegiate Cup scoring system • Men's division II: National Championships team score • Women's division: National Championships team score • GoGreco: GoGreco Championships team score
2019	Allen, Texas (Allen Event Center)	Men's Division II	Penn State (NCWA)	• Men's division I: Collegiate Cup scoring system • Men's division II: National Championships team score • Women's division: National Championships team score • GoGreco: GoGreco Championships team score
2019	Allen, Texas (Allen Event Center)	Women's	Grays Harbor	• Men's division I: Collegiate Cup scoring system • Men's division II: National Championships team score • Women's division: National Championships team score • GoGreco: GoGreco Championships team score
2019	Dallas, Texas (Richland College)	GoGreco	North Texas	• Men's division I: Collegiate Cup scoring system • Men's division II: National Championships team score • Women's division: National Championships team score • GoGreco: GoGreco Championships team score
2020	Allen, Texas (Allen Event Center)	Men's Division I	Liberty	• Men's division I: Collegiate Cup scoring system • Men's division II: National Championships team score • Women's division: National Championships team score • GoGreco: GoGreco Championships team score
2020	Allen, Texas (Allen Event Center)	Men's Division II	East Carolina	• Men's division I: Collegiate Cup scoring system • Men's division II: National Championships team score • Women's division: National Championships team score • GoGreco: GoGreco Championships team score
2020	Allen, Texas (Allen Event Center)	Women's	Schreiner	• Men's division I: Collegiate Cup scoring system • Men's division II: National Championships team score • Women's division: National Championships team score • GoGreco: GoGreco Championships team score
2020	N/A	GoGreco	No season took place due to the Coronavirus pandemic in the United States.	• Men's division I: Collegiate Cup scoring system • Men's division II: National Championships team score • Women's division: National Championships team score • GoGreco: GoGreco Championships team score
2021	N/A	Men's Division I	No season took place due to the Coronavirus pandemic in the United States.	• Men's division I: Collegiate Cup scoring system • Men's division II: National Championships team score • Women's division: National Championships team score • GoGreco: GoGreco Championships team score
2021	N/A	Men's Division II	No season took place due to the Coronavirus pandemic in the United States.	• Men's division I: Collegiate Cup scoring system • Men's division II: National Championships team score • Women's division: National Championships team score • GoGreco: GoGreco Championships team score
2021	N/A	Women's	No season took place due to the Coronavirus pandemic in the United States.	• Men's division I: Collegiate Cup scoring system • Men's division II: National Championships team score • Women's division: National Championships team score • GoGreco: GoGreco Championships team score
2021	N/A	GoGreco	No season took place due to the Coronavirus pandemic in the United States.	• Men's division I: Collegiate Cup scoring system • Men's division II: National Championships team score • Women's division: National Championships team score • GoGreco: GoGreco Championships team score
2022	Allen, Texas (Credit Union of Texas Event Center)	Men's Division I	Liberty	• Men's division I: Collegiate Cup scoring system • Men's division II: National Championships team score • Women's division: National Championships team score
2022	Allen, Texas (Credit Union of Texas Event Center)	Men's Division II	Penn State (NCWA)	• Men's division I: Collegiate Cup scoring system • Men's division II: National Championships team score • Women's division: National Championships team score
2022	Allen, Texas (Credit Union of Texas Event Center)	Women's	Big Bend	• Men's division I: Collegiate Cup scoring system • Men's division II: National Championships team score • Women's division: National Championships team score
2023	San Juan, Puerto Rico (Puerto Rico Convention Center)	Men's Division I	Bellarmine	• Men's division I: Collegiate Cup scoring system • Men's division II: National Championships team score • Women's division: National Championships team score
2023	San Juan, Puerto Rico (Puerto Rico Convention Center)	Men's Division II	Ohio State (NCWA)	• Men's division I: Collegiate Cup scoring system • Men's division II: National Championships team score • Women's division: National Championships team score
2023	San Juan, Puerto Rico (Puerto Rico Convention Center)	Women's	Ottawa - Arizona	• Men's division I: Collegiate Cup scoring system • Men's division II: National Championships team score • Women's division: National Championships team score
2024	Bossier City, Louisiana (Brookshire Grocery Arena)	Men's Division I	Bellarmine	• Men's division I: Collegiate Cup scoring system • Men's division II: National Championships team score • Women's division: National Championships team score
2024	Bossier City, Louisiana (Brookshire Grocery Arena)	Men's Division II	West Chester	• Men's division I: Collegiate Cup scoring system • Men's division II: National Championships team score • Women's division: National Championships team score
2024	Bossier City, Louisiana (Brookshire Grocery Arena)	Women's	Grays Harbor	• Men's division I: Collegiate Cup scoring system • Men's division II: National Championships team score • Women's division: National Championships team score
2025	Bossier City, Louisiana (Brookshire Grocery Arena)	Men's Division I	Menlo	• Men's division I: Collegiate Cup scoring system • Men's division II: National Championships team score • Women's division: National Championships team score
2025	Bossier City, Louisiana (Brookshire Grocery Arena)	Men's Division II	Life	• Men's division I: Collegiate Cup scoring system • Men's division II: National Championships team score • Women's division: National Championships team score
2025	Bossier City, Louisiana (Brookshire Grocery Arena)	Women's	Tarleton State	• Men's division I: Collegiate Cup scoring system • Men's division II: National Championships team score • Women's division: National Championships team score

=== Champions by team ===
School	Total Championships	Year(s) won/Championship type
Southwestern Oregon	7	2012^{W} • 2013^{W} • 2014^{W} • 2015^{W} • 2016^{W} • 2017^{W} • 2018^{W}
Grand Valley State	5	2001^{M} • 2002^{M} • 2006^{M} • 2007^{M} • 2008^{M}
Liberty	5	2015^{D1} • 2018^{D1} • 2019^{D1} • 2020^{D1} • 2022^{D1}
Central Florida	4	2004^{M} • 2005^{M} • 2010 ^{M} • 2016^{D1}
North Texas	3	2017^{GG} • 2018^{GG} • 2019^{GG}
Penn State (NCWA)	3	2018^{D2} • 2019^{D2} • 2022^{D2}
Yakima Valley	3	2009^{W} • 2010^{W} • 2011^{W}
Bellarmine	2	2023^{D1} • 2024^{D1}
California Baptist	2	2011^{D1} • 2013^{D1}
Grays Harbor	2	2019^{W} • 2024^{D1}
Pensacola Christian	2	1999^{M} • 2000^{M}
Apprentice	1	2009^{M}
Big Bend	1	2022^{W}
East Carolina	1	2020^{D2}
Emmanuel	1	2017^{D1}
Florida	1	2016^{D2}
Florida Gulf Coast	1	2014^{D2}
Grand Canyon	1	2014^{D1}
Life	1	2025^{D2}
Maine	1	2017^{D2}
Massachusetts Institute of Technology	1	2013^{D2}
Menlo	1	2025^{D1}
Nevada	1	2003^{M}
Northwest Missouri State	1	2011^{D2}
Ohio State (NCWA)	1	2023^{D2}
Ottawa - Arizona	1	2023^{W}
Notre Dame College	1	2012^{D1}
Schreiner	1	2020^{W}
Tarleton State	1	2025^{W}
Washington State	1	2015^{D2}
West Chester	1	2024^{D2}
Wichita State	1	2012^{D2}
Yale	1	1998^{M}

^{M}: Denotes Men's Championship.

^{W}: Denotes Women's Championship.
^{D1}: Denotes Men's Division I Championship.
^{D2}: Denotes Men's Division II Championship.
^{GG}: Denotes GoGreco Championship.
The following championships did not take place due to the Coronavirus pandemic in the United States:

- 2020 GoGreco Championship.
- 2021 Men's Division I Championship.
- 2021 Men's Division II Championship.
- 2021 Women's Championship.
- 2021 GoGreco Championship.

=== Collegiate Cup championship ===
At the 2013 Vision Forum, the NCWA approved a new National Championships Series to crown a true National Team Champion. With the National Dual Meet Championship, the team that wins the Collegiate Cup will earn 24 team points. The runner-up will receive 23, third-place 22, and so forth until the 23rd-place team receives 2 points. All other teams that participated, but did not place in the top 23 will receive 1 point. Those points will be carried over to the individual-based National Championships where teams will continue to score points based on their individual athletes' performances.

The winner of the Collegiate Cup will have accrued the most total points between both events and be presented with the College Cup as the overall NCWA National Champions. Grand Canyon University was the first champion of the new format in 2014.

Championship Year	Champion School	National Dual Meet Championship finish	National Championships finish	Notes
2014	Grand Canyon	1st	1st - Division I	Inaugural Collegiate Cup champions; 1st team to sweep National Dual Meet Championship and National Championships in same season under the Collegiate Cup format
2015	Liberty	1st	1st - Division I	
2016	Central Florida	1st	2nd - Division I	1st team to win Collegiate Cup without winning both the National Dual Meet Championship and National Championships in same season
2017	Emmanuel	1st	1st - Division I	
2018	Liberty	1st	1st - Division I	1st team to win multiple Collegiate Cup championships
2019	Liberty	1st	1st - Division I	1st team to win back-to-back Collegiate Cup championships
2020	Liberty	1st	1st - Division I	National Championships tournament continued during the COVID-19 pandemic
2021	No 2021 season took place due to the Coronavirus pandemic in the United States.			
2022	Liberty	1st	1st - Division I	
2023	Bellarmine	1st	1st - Division I	
2024	Bellarmine	1st	1st - Division I	

== Structure ==
The NCWA is divided into eight regional conferences and four divisions. Men's Division I programs are athletic department funded or have met the NCWA's D-I criteria. Many of the Division I programs also offer athletic scholarships. Men's Division II teams are broken into categories; Emerging Programs, that are developing into Division I teams, and Clubs that operate on campuses where there are established NCAA/NCAA/NJCAA Teams; few Division II schools are of the latter circumstance. Schools whose wrestling teams are competing in the NCWA during their school's transitional period are placed into Division I. Women's programs are any collegiate/post-secondary scholastic programs who also compete in the collegiate folkstyle ruleset. GoGreco programs have most of the same set-up as the men's and women's divisions with the exception that it is under a Greco-Roman ruleset.

In August 2010, the current two-division system was passed at that year's Vision Forum and implemented for the 2011 National Championships.

=== Conferences ===
Conference	Year founded	States/region	Automatic Qualifiers per weight class	Allocated Wild Cards	Notable teams
Great Lakes	2012	Illinois, Indiana, Iowa, Michigan, Minnesota, North Dakota, Ohio, Wisconsin; Mid-West, Great Lakes, Great Plains	5	12	Bellarmine University; Grand Valley State University; University of Toledo
Mid-Atlantic	2003	Kentucky, North Carolina, South Carolina, Tennessee, Virginia, West Virginia; Southeast, Mid-Atlantic	6	15	Allen University; Emory & Henry College; Liberty University; Middle Tennessee State University; Queens University of Charlotte; The Apprentice School
Mid-East	2009	Delaware, Maryland, New Jersey, Pennsylvania; Mid-Atlantic, Northeast	6	15	Penn State - Mont Alto; University of Maryland - Baltimore County; Slippery Rock University; West Chester University; Williamson College of the Trades
Northeast	1998	Connecticut, Maine, Massachusetts, New Hampshire, New York, Rhode Island, Vermont; Northeast	5	15	Massachusetts Institute of Technology; Rensselaer Polytechnic Institute; Springfield Technical Community College; Stony Brook University; United States Military Academy Prep; United States Naval Academy Prep; University of New Hampshire; Yale University
Northwest	2001–2009, 2012	Canada: British Columbia; United States: Alaska, Idaho, Montana, Oregon, South Dakota, Washington, Wyoming; Great Plains, Pacific Northwest	5	15	Big Bend Community College; Central Washington University; Grays Harbor College; Montana Western University; University of British Columbia; Washington State University
Puerto Rico	2022	United States: Puerto Rico; Puerto Rico	2	11	Interamerican University of Puerto Rico; University of Puerto Rico at Mayagüez
Southeast	1998	Alabama, Florida, Georgia, Mississippi; Southeast	5	12	Auburn University; Emmanuel College; Florida A&M University; Florida Gulf Coast University; Florida State University; University of Alabama; University of Central Florida; University of Florida; University of Georgia; University of South Florida
Southwest	1998	Arkansas, Kansas, Louisiana, Missouri, Nebraska, New Mexico, Oklahoma, Texas; Great Plains, Mid-West, South, Southwest	5	15	Texas A&M; University of Texas; Wayne State College
West Coast	1998	Arizona, California, Colorado, Hawaii, Nevada, Utah; West, West Coast	6	22	UT Tech University; UNLV; Sacramento State; UCLA; UC Riverside; Fresno State; San Jose State; Colorado State University; Ottawa University of Arizona; University of Southern California; Santa Rosa JC; Grand Canyon University; Menlo College

=== Former Conferences ===
Former Conference	Years active	Region	Notes
Great Plains Conference	2012-2018	Mid-west, northern, central, western	Teams dispersed into Great Lakes, Northwest, Southwest, and West Coast conferences
North Central Conference	2002-2012	Mid-west, northern, central, northwestern	Split into Great Lake and Great Plains conferences due to large size
Northeastern Conference	1998-2001	Northeast, northern, Atlantic	Renamed "Northeast Conference"
Northern Conference	1998-2002	Mid-west, northern	Renamed "North Central Conference"
Northwestern Conference	2001-2002	Mountain, northwest, Pacific	Renamed "Northwest Conference"
Southeastern Conference	1998-2002	Atlantic, southern, southeastern	Renamed "Southeast Conference"
Southwestern Conference	1998-2002	Central, Mid-west, southern	Renamed "Southwest Conference"
West Conference	2003-2005	Pacific, northwest, southwest, west	Renamed "West Coast Conference"
Western Conference	1998-2001	Pacific, northwest, southwest, west	Renamed "West Conference"

Wrestling clubs in the NCWA: Bloomsburg University, Edinboro University, Ferrum College, Fresno State University, Iowa State University, Lehigh University, Michigan State University, Northern Illinois University, Ohio State University, Pennsylvania State University, Rutgers University, Sacred Heart University, State University of New York - Cortland, University of Buffalo, University of Iowa, University of Maryland, University of Michigan, University of Northern Colorado, University of Pittsburgh, University of Wisconsin, Virginia Military Institute, Virginia Tech University.

== Notable people ==
The NCWA has had thousands of alumni since it began in 1997. Notable alumni include:

- Jeff Allen: First 4x National Champion in NCWA history (2019–2020, 2022–2023).
- Kevin Andres: Head coach of Ottawa - Arizona's men's and women's wrestling teams and current Sports Clubs Coordinator. Head coach of Belmont Abbey (1998–2006), Mercer (2006–2014) men's, and Ottawa (2015–2018) men's wrestling teams.
- Justin Bellman: First 2x National Champion (1998–1999) for Valley Forge Military, 1999 NCWA Most Outstanding Wrestler.
- Jadaen Bernstein: 4x NCAA Division I National Qualifier wrestler for United States Naval Academy. 2014 174 lb National Champion for Navy Prep.
- Asnage Castelly: 2016 Olympic freestyle wrestler for Haiti. Coaches at Springfield Tech.
- Jesse Castro: 4x NCCAA champion wrestler for Liberty and National Wrestling Hall of Fame - Virginia Chapter member. Current head coach of Liberty wrestling team.
- Ryan Diehl: 2x NCAA Division I National Qualifier wrestler for Maryland. 2x NCWA National Champion for Liberty.
- Tony Ferguson: MMA fighter signed with UFC, winner of The Ultimate Fighter 13. 2006 165 lb national champion and 2x All-American for Grand Valley State].
- LeRoy Gardner III: Head men's wrestling coach at University of the Ozarks and NCAA Division III champion for Wartburg. Former head wrestling coach at Houston - Downtown.
- Nicholas Gil: 2x NCAA Division I National Qualifier wrestler for United States Naval Academy. 2015 149 lb National Champion for Navy Prep.
- David Hazewinkel: Olympic Greco-Roman wrestler for the United States of America in 1968 and 1972, brother of Jim Hazewinkel, uncle of Sam Hazewinkel. Coached at Pensacola Christian (1998–2006) and Marion Military (2006–2016).
- Jim Hazewinkel: Olympic Greco-Roman wrestler for the United States of America in 1968 and 1972, brother of Dave Hazewinkel, father of Sam Hazewinkel. Coached at Pensacola Christian (1998–2006) and Marion Military (2006–2016).
- Shay Horton: 3x NAIA National Championships qualifier for Thomas More. 2024 All-American for Thomas More.
- Kailan Keith: 2023 NAIA National Championships qualifier wrestler for Thomas More. 2024 All-American wrestler for Thomas More.
- Josh Kenny: 2024 NCAA Division II National Champion wrestler for Grand Valley State. 2023 National Runner-up for Grand Valley State.
- Seth Konyenbelt: 2024 NCAA Division II National Qualifier for Grand Valley State. 3x All-American and 2x National Runner-up for Grand Valley State.
- Tom Lawlor: MMA fighter signed with UFC. 3x national champion and 4x All-American for Central Florida.
- Henry A. Marsh: 2017 NCWA Hall of Honor Inductee, NCWA Northeast Conference Chairman, NCWA Head of Officials Committee, 3x NCWA Northeast Conference Coach of the Year, 3x NCWA Northeast Conference Team Titles, 10 years University of New Hampshire Head Wrestling Coach, coached 3 NCWA National Champions, a member of the USA Wrestling Hall of Fame, and a 1968 Olympic Trial Finalist.
- Antonio Martinez: 3x Copa Sparta freestyle tournament champion, most recently at 70 kg in 2016. 2016 All-American for Texas - Austin.
- Santiago Martinez: 2015 NCAA Division I National Qualifier wrestler for Lehigh, 2x Pan-American freestyle medalist and World Championships 79 kg freestyle wrestler for Columbia at 79 kg. 2x 157 lb National Champion for Central Florida.
- Daulton Mayer: 2023 NAIA 285 lb All-American for Thomas More. 2023 285 lb All-American for Thomas More.
- Anthony McLaughlin: 2019 NCAA Division I National Qualifier wrestler for Air Force. 2015 184 lb National Champion for Air Force Prep.
- Frank Mensah: Canadian Olympic Trials runner-up and current Development Coach for the Women's Provincial Team and Head Coach/Program Director of Coast Wrestling Academy in the Lower Mainland. 2005 125 lb national champion and 2x All-American for Douglas.
- Zach Merrill: 2017 University Nationals 98 kg Greco-Roman champion, 2018 World Championships 97 kg freestyle qualifier, and 2020 Pan-American Olympic Qualifier representative for Puerto Rico. 2x NCWA champion for California Baptist.
- Andre Metzger: 2x NCAA Division I national champion for Oklahoma and 3x World Championship freestyle wrestling medalist for United States of America and National Wrestling Hall of Fame inductee c/o 2017. Head coach of North Texas.
- Pat Milkovich: 2x NCAA Division I national champion and 4x NCAA Division I finalist for Michigan State and National Wrestling Hall of Fame inductee c/o 2000. Former head coach of Florida Gulf Coast University.
- Ryan Moore: 2023 NAIA 149 lb National Runner-up for Thomas More. 2024 149 lb National Champion for Thomas More.
- Bill Neal: Former Greco-Roman wrestling coach for United States Olympic Training Center. Head wrestling coach at Richland.
- Ike Okoli: 2014 World Championships +90 kg bronze medalist in Beach Wrestling for United States of America, 2019 Turkmen Goresh bronze medalist at the World Nomad Games, and 2019 US Open 130 kg Greco-Roman place winner. 2x NCWA All-American for South Carolina.
- Jasmit Phulka: 2x World Championships qualifier and 2x Pan American Wrestling Championships medalist for Canada. 2013 NCWA All-American for Douglas College.
- Richard Robitaille: Veteran, author, and founder of Richard Robitaille, LLC. Coached at Valley Forge Military.
- Johnny Rouse: National Wrestling Hall of Fame inductee c/o 2001 and 1976 Regional Olympic Trials Champion. Former coach at Central Florida.
- Melvin Rubio: 2019 NCAA Division II National Qualifier wrestler for Queens. 2018 NCWA All-American at 125 lbs.
- Joe Scott: 2017 NCAA Division III National Qualifier wrestler for Washington & Lee. 2020 NCWA National Champion for Liberty.
- Bruce Shumaker: Edinboro wrestler who wrestled in two U.S. Open Trials. Head coach of Apprentice from 2008 to 2017.
- Jonovan Smith: 2024 Olympic 125 kg freestyle wrestler for Puerto Rico. 2024 National finalist at 285 lbs for Caribbean University
- Geordan Speiller: 2018 World Championships 82 kg Greco-Roman wrestler for the United States of America. 2016 165 lb national champion for Central Florida.
- Cesar Ubico: 2024 Pan-American 92 kg freestyle medalist and wrestler for Guatemala. 2024 197 lb National Champion for Utah Tech
- Cole VonOhlen: 4x NCAA Division I National Qualifier wrestler for United States Air Force Academy. 2009 141 lb National Champion for Air Force Prep.
- Bryant Wood: Model and actor. 2014 NCWA National runner-up for Grand Canyon.
- Josh "The Goods" Woods: Professional wrestler signed with Ring of Honor. 4x NCWA All-American and 2011 National Champion for Central Florida.

== NCWA Gear ==
NCWA Gear is the official apparel of the National Collegiate Wrestling Association. Based out of Orlando, Florida, the business sells sublimated athletic apparel designed for wrestling and mixed martial arts practice and competition for both men and women of all ages. NCWA Gear also offers full customization on its products.

In 2015, USA Wrestling named NCWA Gear's Florida National Team Uniforms for Fargo as the "Best Uniform Package." Mixed martial artists Josh "The Goods" Woods and Daniel "The Animal" Martinez both wore NCWA Gear while fighting.

== See also ==
- NCWA women's wrestling champions
