= Pensacola Christian Eagles =

Intercollegiate sports teams of Pensacola Christian College

- University: Pensacola Christian College
- Nickname: Eagles
- Association: NCCAA
- Conference: NCCAA Division II South Division
- Athletic director: Mark Goetsch
- Location: Pensacola, Florida
- First season: 1977
- Varsity teams: 4 (2 men's, 2 women's)
- Basketball arena: Arlin R. Horton Sports Center (3,199)
- Soccer stadium: Eagle Field (<1,500)
- Colors: Freedom Blue and White
- Mascot: Eagor
- Website: pcceagles.com

The Pensacola Christian Eagles are the athletic teams of Pensacola Christian College, located in the Brent area of Pensacola, Florida. The Eagles are members of the National Christian Collegiate Athletic Association (NCCAA), competing in Division II of the South Division. Athletic teams include men's basketball (1977), women's basketball (2008), volleyball (1994), and men's soccer (2016). The Eagles have won eleven national championships throughout their history: nine in the NCCAA and two in the NCWA. Former sports include men's wrestling (1991–2006) and baseball (early-1980s).

== Programs ==
=== Men's basketball ===
Men's basketball was the first athletic program to compete at Pensacola Christian College. The program first competed during the 1977–78 basketball season. Men's basketball was part of the Orange Belt Christian Conference (OBCC) of the NCCAA from the 1980s until the early-1990s, winning the in-season tournament multiple times. The Eagles played their home games at the Pensacola Christian High School gymnasium from 1977 to 1980 as Pensacola Christian College had yet to have their own facility. January 30, 1981 marked the Eagles' first game in their new field house, known as the John Ray Hall Field House, as they defeated Atlanta Christian College 106–85. They would play at the 2,000-seat Hall Field House until 1993 when they moved to the larger Arlin R. Horton Sports Center, named after a co-founder of the college.

The Eagles made their first NCCAA National Tournament appearance in 1998. (Note: The official PCC Athletics website lists the program as having made the National Tournament in 1996. However, the final two games of that season were actually part of the NCCAA District 2 Tournament) They later competed in the national tournament in 2014 and 2016 as a Division II institution.

Men's Basketball National Tournament History
Year	Tournament	Finish (record)	Source
1998	NCCAA Division I National Tournament	6th (1–2)	
2014	NCCAA Division II National Tournament	DNP (1–2)	
2016	NCCAA Division II National Tournament	5th (3–1)	

=== Women's basketball ===
Women's basketball arrived at the college in 2008. The program started to experience success in the mid-2010s first qualifying for the NCCAA national championship in 2014 and making the tournament every season since. The Lady Eagles were NCCAA Division II national champions in 2022. Women's basketball has been undefeated at home for the 2024–25 and 2025–26 seasons.

Women's Basketball National Tournament History
Year	Tournament	Finish (record)	Source
2014	NCCAA Division II National Tournament	N/A (1–2)	
2015	NCCAA Division II National Tournament	N/A (1–2)	
2016	NCCAA Division II National Tournament	6th (1–2)	
2017	NCCAA Division II National Tournament	DNP (1-1)	
2018	NCCAA Division II National Tournament	3rd (1-1)	
2019	NCCAA Division II National Tournament	2nd (1-1)	
2020	NCCAA Division II National Tournament	(1–0)/COVID-19	
2021	NCCAA Division II National Tournament	3rd (2–1)	
2022	NCCAA Division II National Tournament	Champions (3–0)	
2023	NCCAA Division II National Tournament	4th (1–2)	
2024	NCCAA Division II National Tournament	3rd (2–1)	
2025	NCCAA Division II National Tournament	4th (1–2)	
2026	NCCAA Division II National Tournament	DNP (1-1)	

=== Men's soccer ===
Men's soccer is PCC's newest sport, which returned to Pensacola Christian in the fall of 2016 for the first time since the 1980s. Evidence of a former men's intercollegiate soccer team dates back to at least 1981. Men's soccer has won the NCCAA Division II national championship four times, most recently in 2025.

Men's Soccer National Tournament History
Year	Tournament	Finish (record)	Source
2017	NCCAA Division II National Tournament	Champions (3–0)	
2018	NCCAA Division II National Tournament	DNP (1-1)	
2019	NCCAA Division II National Tournament	Champions (3–0)	
2020	NCCAA Division II National Tournament	Runner-up (1–1–1)	
2023	NCCAA Division II National Tournament	Champions (3–0)	
2025	NCCAA Division II National Tournament	Champions (3–0–1)	

=== Volleyball ===
Volleyball was the first women's intercollegiate sport at Pensacola Christian College, first played in 1994. The Lady Eagles have made the NCCAA National Tournament seven times in program history: twice in Division I and five times in Division II. Their 2021 appearance marked the first time the Lady Eagles advanced past the pool stage of the tournament. They were once again semifinalist participants in 2025.

Volleyball National Tournament History
Year	Tournament	Finish (record)	Source
2002	NCCAA Division I National Tournament	DNP (1–3)	
2009	NCCAA Division I National Tournament	DNP (0–4)	
2014	NCCAA Division II National Tournament	DNP (1–3)	
2015	NCCAA Division II National Tournament	DNP (2–2)	
2020	NCCAA Division II National Tournament	DNP (0–2)	
2021	NCCAA Division II National Tournament	Semifinals (2–2)	
2024	NCCAA Division II National Tournament	DNP (2–2)	
2025	NCCAA Division II National Tournament	Semifinals (3–1)	

=== Former sports ===
Discontinued sports at Pensacola Christian College include baseball and men's wrestling.

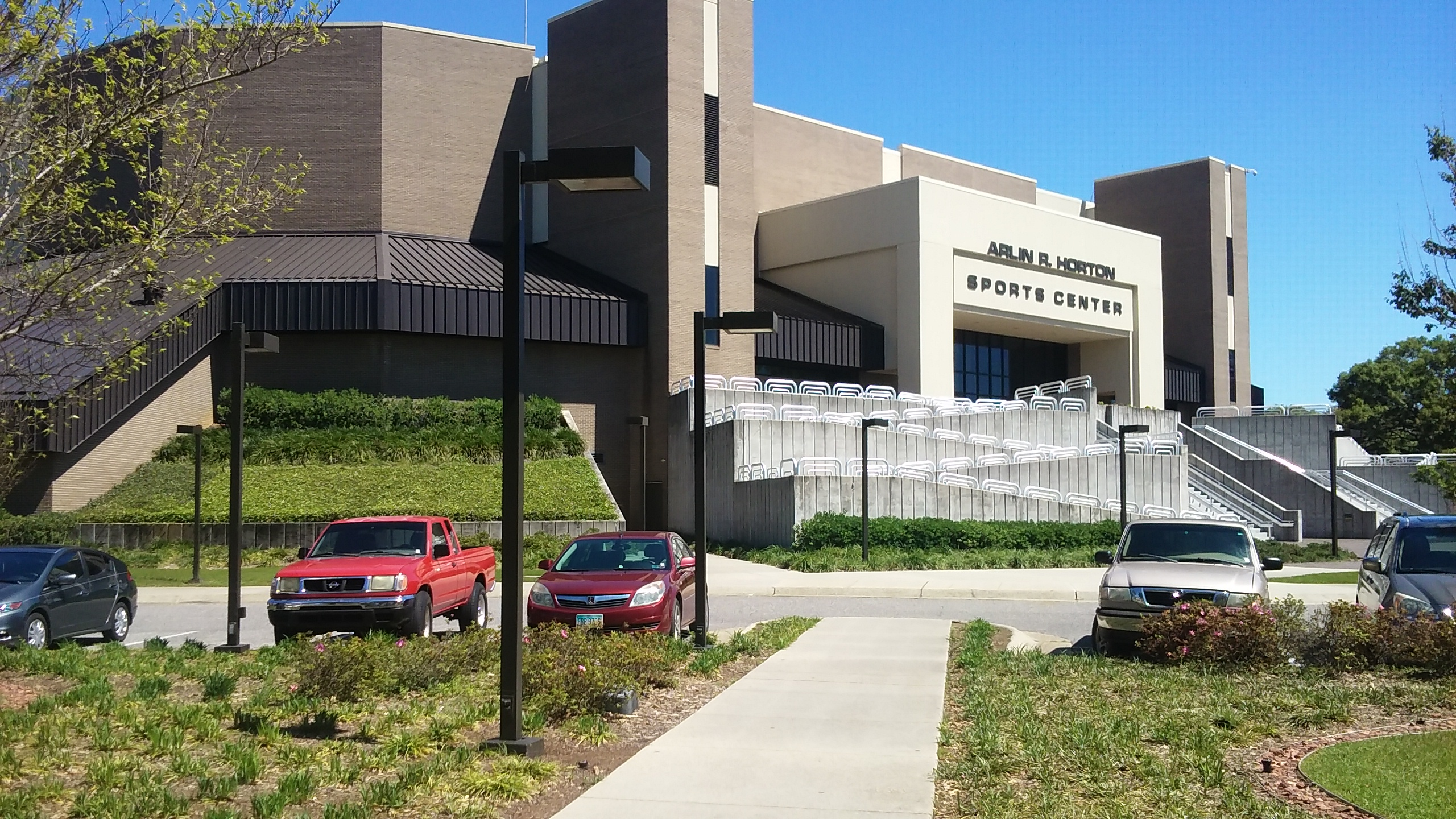
The Pensacola Christian Eagles basketball and volleyball teams compete at the Arlin R. Horton Sports Center

Baseball was a short-lived sport at PCC, played from 1981 until around 1983. One notable outcome for the Eagle nine occurred on April 10, 1982, when Pensacola Christian and Alabama Christian (now Faulkner University) played an extremely unconventional triple-header. The Eagles lost all three games and were outscored 30–6, allowing a total of twenty stolen bases in games consisting of five, seven, and six innings, respectively.

==== Men's wrestling ====
Men's wrestling was a sport at Pensacola Christian from 1991 until 2006, competing in the NCCAA from 1991 to 1998 and in the NCWA from 1998 to 2006. The Eagles' first wrestling matchup was a loss to Florida State at PCC on November 23, 1991. As of the 2004–05 season, Pensacola Christian was the only varsity intercollegiate men's wrestling program in the state of Florida. All others, including other NCWA programs, were club sports. Sixty-seven Eagles were named All-Americans throughout the program's history: 28 in the NCCAA and 39 in the NCWA. While in the NCWA, PCC won two Most Outstanding Wrestler awards and had nine national champions. Men's wrestling was coached by hall of fame wrestler Jim Hazewinkel from 1991 to 2006, as well as Dave Hazewinkel, Jim's twin brother, as of 2004.

Year	Coach	Accolades
1991-92	Jim Hazewinkel	NCCAA Championship 4th Place 1 All-American
1992-93	Jim Hazewinkel	NCCAA Championship 3rd Place 3 All-Americans; Jim Hazewinkel NCCAA Coach of the Year
1993-94	Jim Hazewinkel	NCCAA Champions 5 All-Americans; Outstanding Wrestler Award Recipient; Jim Hazewinkel NCCAA Coach of the Year
1994-95	Jim Hazewinkel	NCCAA Champions 4 All-Americans; Jim Hazewinkel NCCAA Coach of the Year; PCC Invitational Champions
1995-96	Jim Hazewinkel	NCCAA Champions 7 All-Americans; Jim Hazewinkel NCCAA Coach of the Year; PCC Invitational Champions
1996-97	Jim Hazewinkel	NCCAA Championship 2nd Place 4 All-Americans; PCC Invitational Champions
1997-98	Jim Hazewinkel	NCCAA Champions 4 All-Americans; 1 At-Large All-American; Ben Peterson Christian Sportsmanship Award Recipient; Jim Hazewinkel NCCAA Coach of the Year (Note: The "Men's Wrestling Archives" document mistakenly has Jim Hazewinkel as being the coach at Indiana Wesleyan under the 1998 "Coach of the Year" entry. Hazewinkel was the men's wrestling coach at Pensacola Christian for the entirety of the program's history.)
1998-99	Jim Hazewinkel	NCWA Champions NCWA Southeastern Conference Tournament Champions
1999-00	Jim Hazewinkel	NCWA Champions NCWA Southeastern Conference Tournament Champions; Jim Hazewinkel NCWA Coach of the Year
2000-01	Jim Hazewinkel	NCWA Championship 3rd Place NCWA Southeastern Conference Tournament Champions
2001-02	Jim Hazewinkel	NCWA Championship 5th Place NCWA Southeastern Conference Tournament Champions; Jim Hazewinkel NCWA Coach of the Year
2002-03	Jim Hazewinkel	NCWA Championship 5th Place
2003-04	Jim Hazewinkel	
2004-05	Jim Hazewinkel	NCWA Championship 8th Place
2005-06	Jim Hazewinkel	NCWA Championship 3rd Place NCWA Southeast Conference Tournament Champions

== Notable athletes ==
- John Libka (2009), played men's basketball from 2005-2009. Current MLB umpire.
- Steven Guinchard (did not graduate from PCC), played men's basketball from 2012-2013. Taiwanese-French professional basketball player for the Hong Kong Eastern basketball club.
