= Cooperating Colleges of Greater Springfield =

Logo of the Cooperating Colleges of Greater Springfield

The Cooperating Colleges of Greater Springfield (CCGS) is a consortium of accredited colleges and universities located in Hampden County in Western Massachusetts, in and around the city of Springfield. Formed in 1971, the consortium provides various benefits to the students enrolled in its member institutions. It includes four-year public and private institutions as well as two-year community colleges, all of which are non-profit schools accredited by the New England Association of Schools and Colleges.

== Benefits ==
The CCGS members commonly share academic coursework calendars to allow for students from one college to take classes at another, if desired, while paying the same tuition and fees to their home institution. All the member schools share library resources, and jointly promote institutional events. Member institutions may also organize additional initiatives such as the Creative Alternatives to the Textbook workshop, a multi-lecture event organized to aid students in finding reliable sources online as an alternative to traditional textbooks.

== Members ==
The association consists of the following schools:

- American International College, Springfield, MA
- Bay Path University, Longmeadow, MA
- Elms College, Chicopee, MA
- Holyoke Community College, Holyoke, MA
- Springfield College, Springfield, MA
- Springfield Technical Community College, Springfield, MA
- Western New England University, Springfield, MA
- Westfield State University, Westfield, MA

== See also ==
- List of colleges and universities in Massachusetts
- Five College Consortium
