= Henry A. Marsh (politician, born 1943) =

American politician and businessman

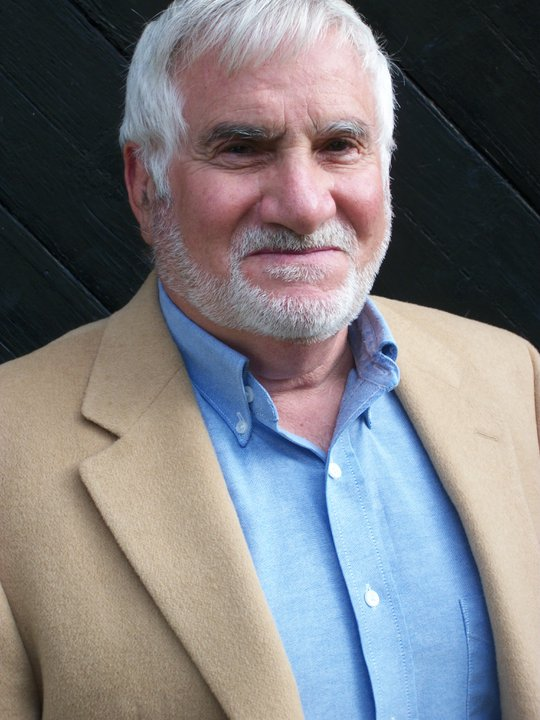
Henry Marsh in 2010

Henry A. Marsh (born July 13, 1943) is an American businessman, athlete, politician, and educator in New Hampshire. He is a member of the National Collegiate Wrestling Association Hall of Honor for lifetime achievement as well as an inductee in the USA Wrestling Hall of Fame, and the University of New Hampshire Wrestling Hall of Fame.

Marsh was an accomplished athlete, coach, official, and leader in the sport of wrestling. His high school record was 35-0, he was also a two-time New England high school champion. At Appalachian State University he was 47-1 (his first and only loss in his first collegiate match) Additionally as a United States Wrestling Federation national champion, and 1968 US Olympic Trials finalist, one could say he had a successful wrestling career. His dedication to the sport of wrestling continued for four decades as an NCAA Division I official.

Marsh spent ten years as Head Wrestling Coach for the University of New Hampshire with three NCWA Northeast Conference team titles and three national champions. Henry Marsh was awarded NCWA Northeast Conference Coach of the Year three times, and serves as NCWA Northeast Conference chairman.

After retiring from teaching physical education in Rye, New Hampshire, Marsh went into business. As co-owner of a classic car sales operation, Hampton Motor Company, he was awarded the Ronald Reagan Republican Gold Award and 2005 Businessman of the Year by the Republican National Committee.

Marsh served his local community in 2016-2018, as a state legislator through election to the New Hampshire House of Representatives for Rockingham County District 22, participating as a member of the Executive Committee. Although elected as a Republican, he is a registered Independent and was not bothered when his wife, Phyllis Marsh, was the photographer for President Clinton in New Hampshire.

New Hampshire House of Representatives
Preceded by Michele S. Peckham	Member of the New Hampshire House of Representatives from the Rockingham 22nd district 2016–2018	Succeeded by Jim Maggiore
