= National Association for Community College Entrepreneurship =

American membership organization

- Formation: 2002
- Headquarters: Springfield, Massachusetts
- Website: https://nacce.com/

The National Association for Community College Entrepreneurship (NACCE) is a non-profit membership organization founded in 2002 on the campus of Springfield Technical Community College in Springfield, Massachusetts. It is an organization of educators, presidents, and entrepreneurs.

Through an annual conference and regional summits, symposiums, freely available resources, biweekly e-newsletter, webinars, a quarterly journal, podcasts, and other services, NACCE helps its members share information about entrepreneurship education. NACCE also provides curriculum and other tools that can be used in the classroom and in communities to facilitate entrepreneurship projects and progress.

== History ==
The first entrepreneurship education courses at community colleges started in the early 1970s. In 2001, Springfield Technical Community College and the Entrepreneurial Institute at the Springfield Enterprise Center at STCC in Massachusetts began to research and investigate entrepreneurship education practices at community colleges across the country. At the same time, both the American Association of Community Colleges (AACC) and the National Commission on Entrepreneurship recognized that community colleges were ideally positioned to be catalysts for fostering economic vitality through entrepreneurship education at the community college level.

In response, NACCE was created to establish entrepreneurship education as a core offering to foster economic development through community colleges. An inaugural conference in 2003 with 150 attendees was held with the support of a $100,000 grant from S. Prestley Blake, the co-founder of Friendly Ice Cream Corporation. NACCE went on to receive a $50,000 grant from the Ewing Marion Kauffman Foundation of Kansas City and a $20,000 grant from the Coleman Foundation of Chicago.

The Coleman Foundation continued its support of NACCE with a series of annual Elevator Grant Competitions and other competitions at the Annual NACCE Conference. The purpose of these competitions, which resulted in tens of thousands of dollars in grants going to NACCE members, was to identify best practices in entrepreneurship education.

In 2015, NACCE named Rebecca A. Corbin, Ed.D., as its second president, succeeding Heather Van Sickle, who had served as president from 2005 to 2015.

In 2024, the organization acquired SkillPointe technology platform as a charitable donation.

== Programs and initiatives ==
In 2011, NACCE launched the Presidents for Entrepreneurship Pledge (PFEP), which encourages all community college presidents to endorse five commitments that will ensure that community colleges are involved in the national discussion about how to increase entrepreneurship. This initiative was inspired by the Obama White House's launch of Startup America, a program in which NACCE participated, along with the American Association of Community Colleges via a grant from the Charles Stewart Mott Foundation to fund a Virtual Incubation Network at community colleges.

In 2014, a quantitative research study that included responses from over 900 individuals, validated the effectiveness of the PFEP pledge with statistically significant relationships for the first four out of five commitments.

In 2017 NACCE started its nationwide communities of practice, enabling entrepreneurial practitioners and leaders to share best practices and thought leadership. In 2019, 400 participants attended the ESHIP Summit to network and share best practices for ecosystem building. In 2020, NACCE launched the Women in Entrepreneurship Center of Practice and the Global Entrepreneurship Center of Practice, bringing its total number of centers of practice to nine.

In 2021, NACCE represented community colleges in policy discussions at the White House, state governor's offices, the Small Business Administration, and in local communities across the United States.

The organization participates in a number of annual entrepreneurship celebrations, including National Entrepreneurship Week, Global Entrepreneurship Week, and other observances that bring together entrepreneurial ecosystems responsible for creating opportunity in local, national, and global communities.

NACCE and Verizon partnered in 2021 and launched "Verizon Small Business Digital Ready." The program offers businesses free support to enable digital readiness through customized curriculum, helping to offset the negative impact of the pandemic, which had a disproportionate impact on minority-owned small businesses.

The "Entrepreneurial College of the Future" was also launched in 2022. This led to the creation of a comprehensive, free database of innovative practices that can be shared nationwide.

== Publications ==
In 2019, NACCE published Community Colleges as Incubators of Innovation. In 2020, NACCE published its second book, Impact ED: How Community College Entrepreneurship Creates Equity and Prosperity, by Rebecca Corbin, Andrew Gold, and Mary Beth Kerly. Also in 2020, NACCE moved its national headquarters to a campus of Wake Technical Community College in Cary, North Carolina, while still maintaining an administrative office in Springfield, Massachusetts.

== Annual conference ==
NACCE's annual conference provides the opportunity for community college professionals to gather together to identify opportunities and create positive organizational and community change through entrepreneurship. Each year at the conference awards are presented for Entrepreneurial College of the Year, Entrepreneurial President, and Lifetime Achievement.

During its 2022 Annual Conference in Boston, NACCE launched the inaugural "Pitch for the Foundation" competition in partnership with the Philip E. and Carole R. Ratcliffe Foundation. Combined with the annual "Pitch for the Trades" competition, the two events awarded community college teams with a total of $300,000 to support entrepreneurial initiatives.

NACCE's 2022 Annual Conference attracted 400 in-person and remote attendees from 46 states.

== Partnerships ==
NACCE works to establish partnerships with companies and nonprofits that share its interest in advancing entrepreneurship. In 2020, these partnerships enabled NACCE to provide members with grants of over $2 million, among other benefits. Current partnerships include:

Appalachian Regional Commission - NACCE has partnered with the Appalachian Regional Commission (ARC) to promote the efforts of community colleges in a multi-state region and to ensure their leadership in opening the door wider for entrepreneurship in Appalachia.

Burton D. Morgan Foundation - NACCE partnered with the Burton D. Morgan Foundation to support Northeast Ohio community college teams by providing scholarships to attend NACCE's national conference.

Citizen Schools - NACCE is a program supporter of the Makers + Mentors Network and has partnered with Citizen Schools to expand its efforts to support makerspacers and maker-centered learning in NACCE member colleges and the communities they serve. Many of NACCE's member colleges are currently hosting maker fellows who are building capacity in their organizations to catalyze making as a means for career development, workforce development, mentoring, and STEM education.

Direct Selling Education Foundation – The Direct Selling Education Foundation (DSEF) is a nonprofit public education organization affiliated with the Direct Selling Association. Since 2011, DSEF has worked with NACCE to offer a jointly developed curriculum on direct selling at NACCE member colleges. The Direct Selling Entrepreneur Initiative seeks to increase the awareness of direct selling as an entrepreneurship strategy and a viable pathway for individuals to start their own businesses.

The Ewing Marion Kauffman Foundation – NACCE partnered with the Kauffman Foundation for the ESHIP Summit, which was launched in 2017 to bring together entrepreneurship ecosystem builders. In 2021, the Kauffman Foundation sponsored NACCE's Future Building Summit, hosted as part of NACCE's Annual Conference.

Michigan State University Center for International Business & Research (MSU CIBER) - NACCE has partnered with MSU CIBER to promote the goal of providing superior education, research, and assistance to businesses, public policy makers, academics, and students on international business and trade. NACCE hosts workshops in partnerships with MSU CIBER on a variety of topics including internationalizing a community college and global entrepreneurship.

Verizon Innovative Learning STEM Achievers Program - Middle school students gain access to emerging technologies at college campuses nationwide through the Verizon Innovative Learning STEM Achievers Program. Forty-four NACCE member colleges participate in the program.
