= Longmeadow Street–North Historic District =

Historic district in Massachusetts, United States

- U.S. National Register of Historic Places
- U.S. Historic district
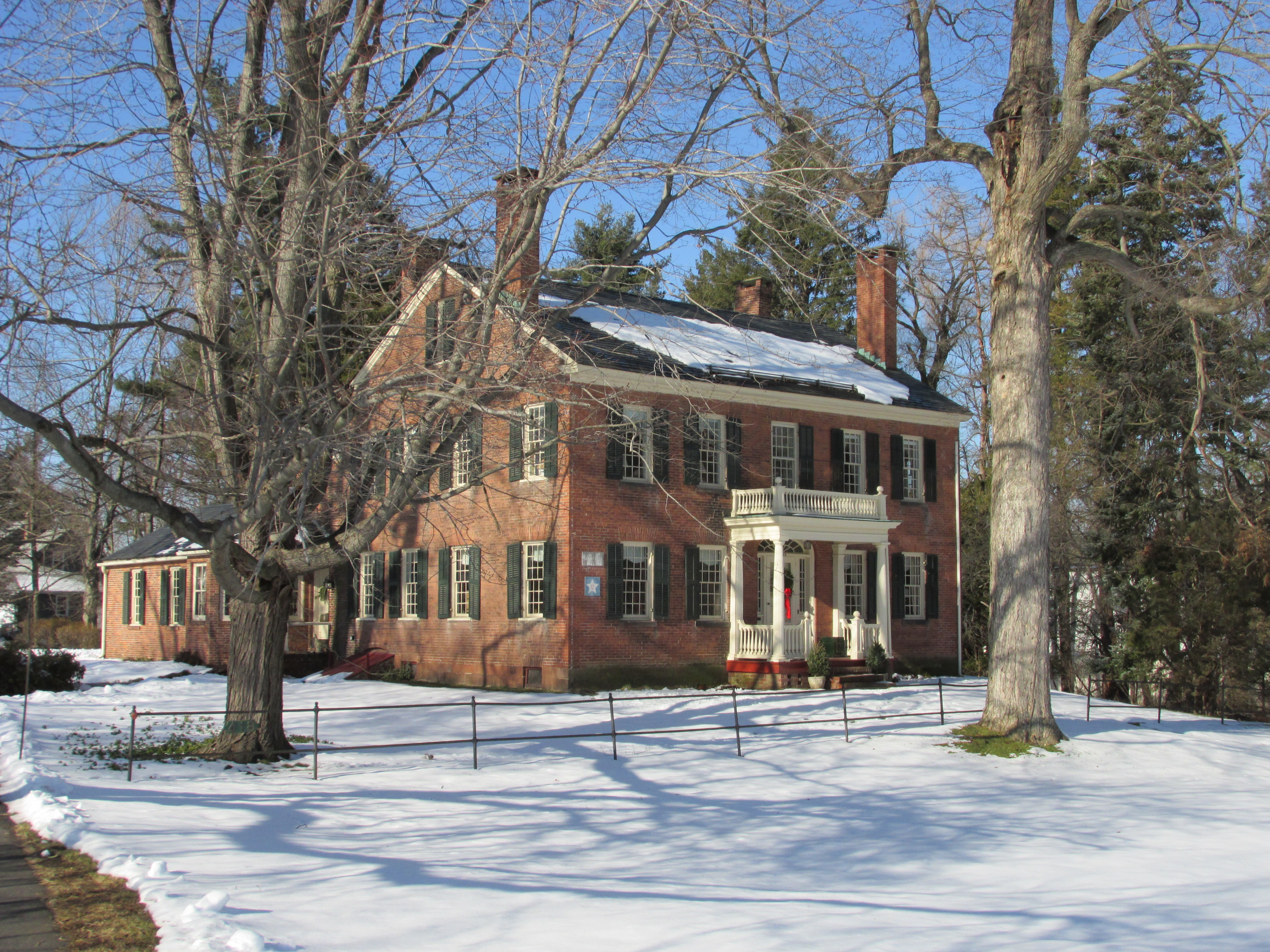
- Cooley-Eveleth House

- Location within Massachusetts Location within the United States
- Location: Longmeadow St., Longmeadow, Massachusetts
- Coordinates: 42°4′1″N 72°34′41″W
- Area: 80 acres (32 ha)
- Architect: Shea, Jeremiah; et al.
- Architectural style: Colonial, Early Republic, Mid 19th Century Revival
- NRHP reference No.: 94001262
- Added to NRHP: October 28, 1994

The Longmeadow Street–North Historic District encompasses a stretch of Longmeadow Street (US Route 5) in northern Longmeadow, Massachusetts, from the town line with neighboring Springfield to Cooley and Westmoreland Streets in the south. It was listed on the National Register of Historic Places in 1994. The district's primarily residential architecture and streetscape is reflective of more than two centuries of development trends, and a late 19th-century desire to maintain a more rural atmosphere.

== Description and history ==
The area that is now Longmeadow was originally settled by colonists in the 17th century as part of Springfield, from which it was separately incorporated in 1783, after many years of political maneuvering. The town had a mainly agricultural focus well into the 20th century, the bottomlands of the Connecticut River (which forms the town's western boundary) proving extremely fertile and giving the town its name. Longmeadow Street, located on a terrace above that plain, was from an early date the principal north-south route on the east side of the river, and the town's principal thoroughfare. In the 19th century, the quarrying of brownstone became a major industry, prompting a shift in population away from the river and toward the quarries further east. As a result, the northern portion of Longmeadow Street was shifted eastward sometime between 1870 and 1894. A local preservationist organization was formed in 1876 to maintain the character of Longmeadow Street as a tree-lined and predominantly residential street.

East Longmeadow, more industrialized than the rural west, was separated from Longmeadow in 1894, and a streetcar line was extended from Springfield along Longmeadow Street in 1896, setting the stage for its transformation into a residential suburb. Most of this development took place on either side of Longmeadow Street, with new road junctions the principal alteration to the streetscape.

As a result of this history, the area between the Springfield town line and Cooley Brook contains a number of fine examples of residential architecture spanning from the 18th to the 20th century. There are only six non-residential buildings: a church, four small commercial buildings, and a former town building. The area around Cooley Brook, which once served as the town's main water supply, was converted into a public park, designed by the well-known Olmsted Brothers firm.

== See also ==
- Longmeadow Historic District, which encompasses the village center
- National Register of Historic Places listings in Hampden County, Massachusetts
