= Longmeadow Historic District =

Historic district in Massachusetts, United States

- U.S. National Register of Historic Places
- U.S. Historic district
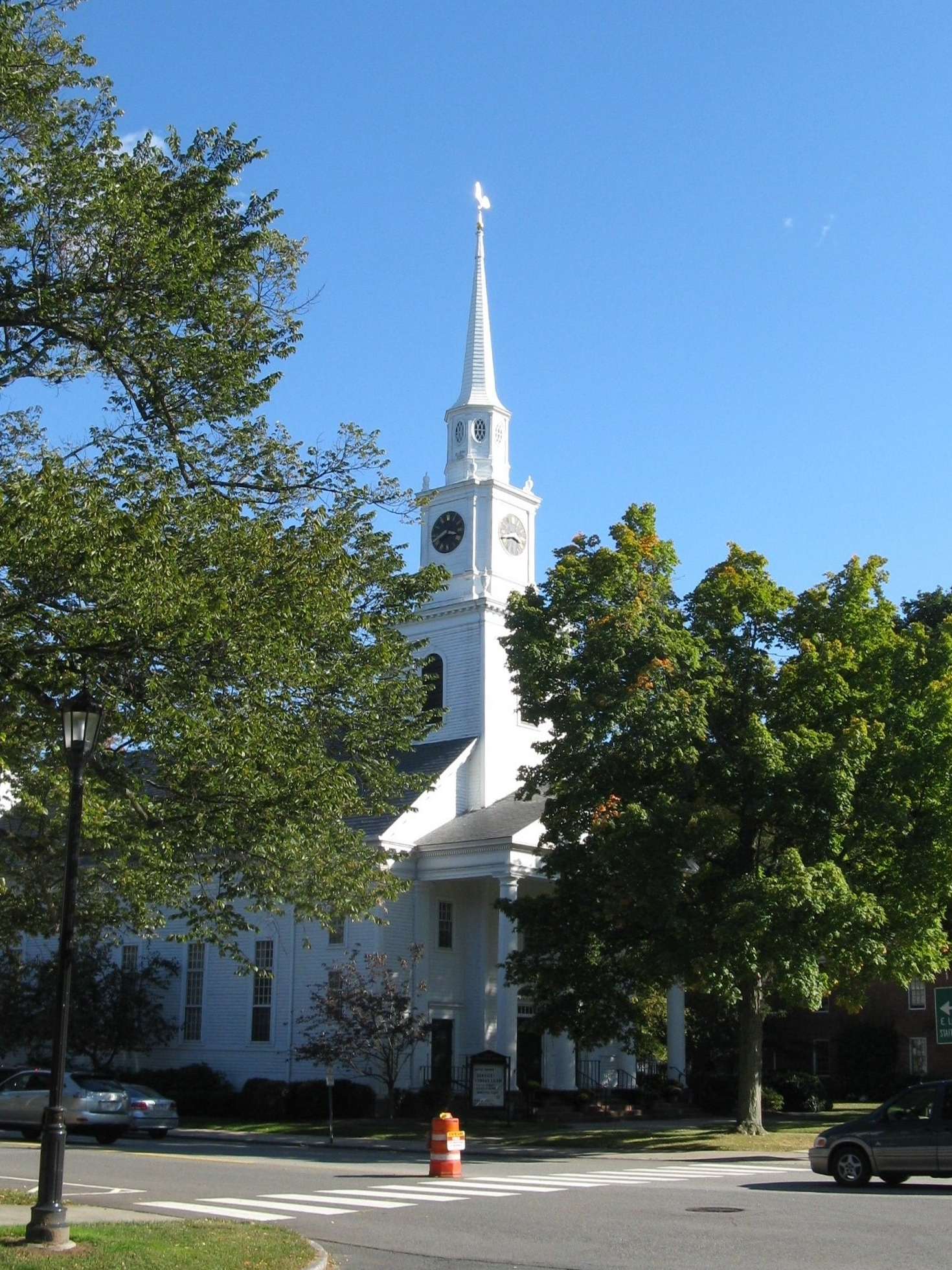
- First Church of Christ

- Location within Massachusetts Location within the United States
- Location: Roughly Longmeadow St. from Birdie Rd. to Wheelmeadow Brook, Longmeadow, Massachusetts
- Coordinates: 42°2′57″N 72°34′59″W
- Area: 65 acres (26 ha)
- Built: 1713
- Architect: Multiple
- Architectural style: Mid 19th Century Revival, Colonial Revival, Mixed (more Than 2 Styles From Different Periods)
- NRHP reference No.: 82000490
- Added to NRHP: November 12, 1982

The Longmeadow Historic District is a historic district encompassing the village green of Longmeadow, Massachusetts and properties in its immediate vicinity. The district acquired local protection in 1973 and was added to the National Register of Historic Places in 1982.

Longmeadow's village green was laid out in the early 18th century, and it is the area around which the town center developed. It is located on a sandy ridge on a terrace about 1 mile (1.6 km) east of the Connecticut River, with a flood plain in between that now also carries Interstate 91. The green is a long park running north–south between Ely and Birnie Roads, with the main travel lanes of Longmeadow Street (United States Route 5) on the west side and an access road (also designated Longmeadow Street) on the east side. The green is mainly grassy, and is lined with mature trees. Its only significant man-made structure is the town's war memorial, placed in 1931.

The green historically saw a variety of uses, and was only formally turned into a park late in the 19th century. The buildings that face the green for the most part date from the 18th and 19th centuries; the principal 20th century structures are the public library building (a brick Colonial Revival structure built in 1932), Town Hall (1930), and the Center School (built 1928, modern annex added in the 1950s). The Old Country Store (1805) is the only commercial building in the district, and there is only one church, the First Congregational (1768). The oldest house (of more than 40 in the district) dates to 1725, while the latest date to the 1910s. The district was named as one of the 1,000 places to visit in Massachusetts by the Great Places in Massachusetts Commission.

== See also ==
- National Register of Historic Places listings in Hampden County, Massachusetts
- Longmeadow Street-North Historic District, which lies north of this district
