= WTCC (FM) =

- Springfield, Massachusetts; United States
- Frequency: 90.7 MHz (HD Radio)

Programming
- Format: College

Ownership
- Owner: Springfield Technical Community College

History
- First air date: August 19, 1971
- Call sign meaning: Technical Community College

Technical information
- Licensing authority: FCC
- Facility ID: 62018
- Class: A
- ERP: 4,000 watts
- HAAT: 28 meters (92 ft)
- Transmitter coordinates: 42°6′32.3″N 72°34′43.3″W

Links
- Public license information: Public file; LMS
- Webcast: Listen Live
- Website: www.wtccfm.org

WTCC (90.7 FM) is a college radio station licensed to serve Springfield, Massachusetts. The station is owned by Springfield Technical Community College (STCC), with studios and transmitter located in Garvey Hall on the STCC campus. It airs a college radio format.

The station was assigned the WTCC call letters by the Federal Communications Commission.

== See also ==
- List of community radio stations in the United States
