= Springfield Technical Community College =

Public college in Springfield, Massachusetts, US

- Seal of the College
- Motto: Hodie parando cras paratus es (Latin)
- Motto in English: "Today we are preparing to act tomorrow"
- Type: Public community college
- Established: 1967
- Accreditation: NECHE
- Affiliations: Cooperating Colleges of Greater Springfield
- President: Jennifer G. Cournoyer
- Total staff: 666 (fall 2025)
- Students: 6,150 (fall 2025)
- Location: Springfield, Massachusetts, U.S. 42°6′31.42″N 72°34′48.67″W
- Nickname: STCC
- Mascot: Rams
- Website: www.stcc.edu

Springfield Technical Community College (STCC, Stick) is a public technical college in Springfield, Massachusetts. It is the only technical community college in the Commonwealth of Massachusetts. Located on the site of the Springfield Armory National Park, which was founded by Henry Knox and George Washington during the Revolutionary War, Springfield Technical Community College now occupies many of the buildings used by the U.S. Armory at Springfield prior to the Armory's closure in 1969. While 20 acres (81,000 m^{2}) of the 55-acre (220,000 m^{2}) site remain in the hands of the U.S. National Park Service for historic preservation, 35 acres (140,000 m^{2}) comprise the college campus. Numerous historic buildings have been repurposed as classrooms, in addition to newer facilities built on-site.

STCC offers over 90 associate degree and certificate programs. Students may transfer to four-year colleges and universities as well as members of the Cooperating Colleges of Greater Springfield (CCGS). STCC offers day, evening, weekend, and online classes. STCC is accredited by the New England Commission of Higher Education.

== Campus ==
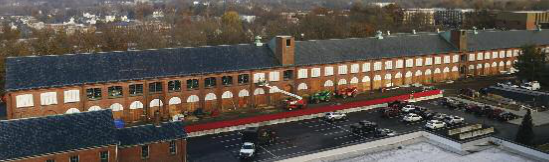
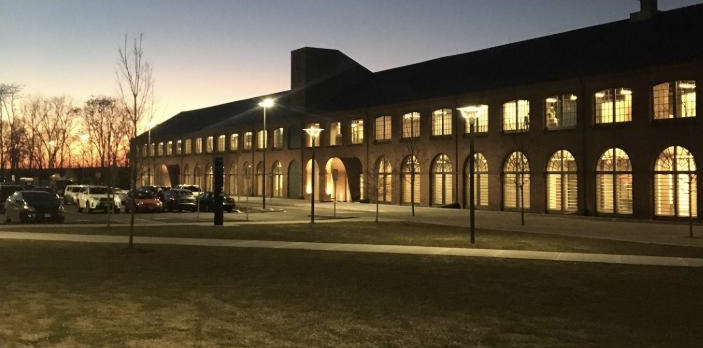
The Ira H. Rubenzahl Student Learning Commons, formerly a storehouse for the Armory (top); one of several armory structures the community college has repurposed, from 2015 to 2018 it was converted into new administrative offices and student commons

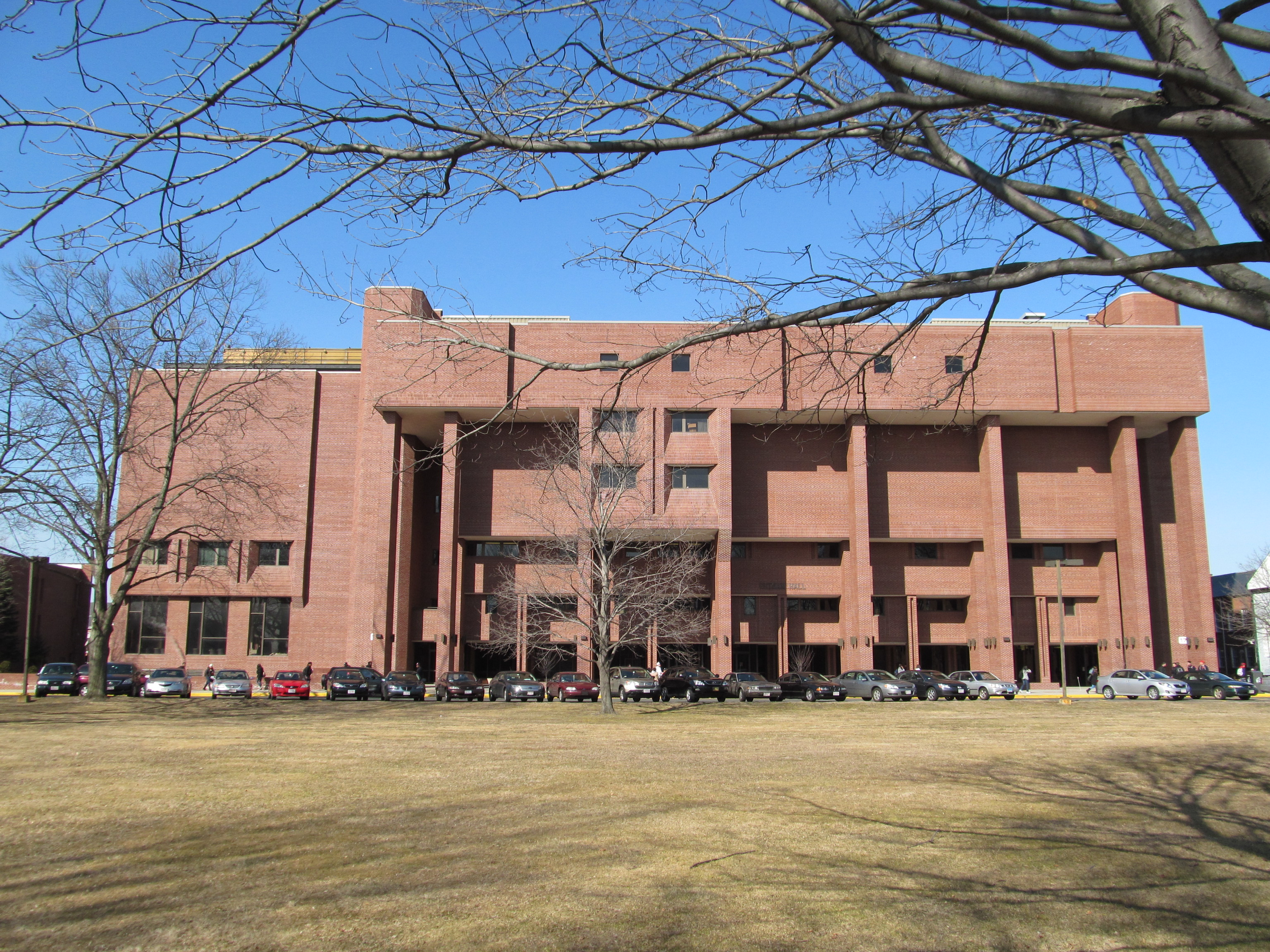
Putnam Hall

Founded in 1964 as the Springfield Technical Institute (STI) and located a few blocks to the west at the then Springfield Trade School (now Roger L Putnam Vocational-Technical High School), STCC moved, expanded, and adopted its current name in 1969.

Facilities include the Amy H. Carberry Fine Arts Gallery, the Top of Our City Conference Center, the Ira H. Rubenzahl Student Learning Commons, the SIMS Medical Center, and the Smith & Wesson Technology Applications Center.

The STCC campus is home to the Western Massachusetts Municipal Police Training Academy.

=== Springfield Armory ===
The STCC campus sits on the Springfield Armory National Historic Site, founded in 1777, and is managed and operated by the National Park Service. The Main Arsenal Building houses the Springfield Armory Museum and the Commandants House houses NPS staff. Other buildings (the oldest dates back to 1807) are used by STCC and the STCC Technology Park. As the only "technical" community college in Massachusetts, STCC aims to continue the legacy of technological innovation at the Springfield Armory site. While 20 acres (81,000 m^{2}) of the 55-acre (220,000 m^{2}) site remain in the hands of the Park Service for historic preservation, 35 acres (140,000 m^{2}) are used by the college.

=== STCC Technology Park ===
The STCC Technology Park continues an important role in technology transfer that the Springfield Armory began in 1794. The 15.3-acre site is managed by the STCC Assistance Corporation and is located across the street from the main STCC campus.

=== STCC Assistance Corporation ===
The STCC Assistance Corporation (STCCAC) was formed through an act of the Massachusetts General Court to purchase land formerly part of the Springfield Armory site to help the college grow. The Assistance Corporation is governed by its own board of directors.

== Academics ==
Springfield Technical Community College offers associate degrees and certificates in over 90 programs.

STCC is home to the only degree-granting Optics and Photonics Technology program in New England. Established in 1976, in recent years the community college has collaborated with a Massachusetts Institute of Technology (MIT)-based agency and the American Institute for Manufacturing Integrated Photonics of Rochester, to bolster its photonics program, providing modern lab facilities. Citing a high demand for such jobs in the region, the college has also been working towards the expansion of this technician-training program, including a proposed "Photonics Education and Practice Factory" emulating a similar facility completed at MIT in 2017.

== Innovation ==
STCC is a member of the Knowledge Corridor economic and cultural alliance, which covers the region anchored by Springfield, Massachusetts and Hartford, Connecticut.

=== NACCE ===
STCC played a key role in the 2002 founding of the National Association for Community College Entrepreneurship (NACCE).

== Student life ==
=== Athletics ===
STCC has advanced to the national championship tournament in men's soccer, women's soccer, men's basketball, golf, and wrestling. The women's soccer team is known for its competitive teams and won the national division 3 NJCAA title in 2005.

Many students attend STCC as junior college (JUCO) athletes in order to transfer to sport-competitive NCAA schools after completing their associate degrees.

Men's Teams	Women's Teams
Basketball	Basketball
Soccer	Soccer
Wrestling	Wrestling

== See also ==
- WTCC (90.7 FM), the community college's radio station.
