= Stony Brook =

Stony Brook, Stonybrook or Stoney Brook may refer to:

== Education ==
- Stony Brook University, a public research university in Stony Brook, New York
  - Stony Brook Seawolves, the university's athletic programs
  - Stony Brook University Hospital, a tertiary academic medical center serving Long Island
- The Stony Brook School, a private secondary school in Stony Brook, New York

== Places ==
=== Communities ===
- Stoney Brook Township, St. Louis County, Minnesota
- Stony Brook, New York, a hamlet in western Suffolk County on Long Island

=== Parks and historic sites ===
==== Massachusetts ====
- Stony Brook Air Force Station, a defunct Air Force facility in Ludlow
- Stony Brook Reservation, a state park at the headwaters of Stony Brook, Boston
- Stony Brook Wildlife Sanctuary, Norfolk
- Stony Brook Power Plant, Ludlow. The power plant located on the Stony Brook Air Force Station

==== Elsewhere ====
- Stony Brook Meeting House and Cemetery, historic Quaker sites in Princeton, New Jersey
- Stony Brook State Park, in Dansville, New York

== Transportation ==
- Stony Brook station (MBTA), a rapid transit station in Boston, Massachusetts
- Stony Brook station (LIRR), a Long Island Rail Road station in Stony Brook, New York
- Stony Brook station (Boston and Maine Railroad), a former station on the MBTA Fitchburg Line in Weston, Massachusetts
- Shixi station, which can be literally translated as a Stony Brook station, station on Guangfo Line, Guangzhou, China

== Waterways ==
=== New England, United States ===
- Stony Brook (Charles River tributary, Boston), empties into the Charles River Basin
- Stony Brook (Merrimack River tributary), northeastern Massachusetts, meets at Chelmsford
- Stony Brook (Charles River tributary, Weston), meets the Charles in Weston
- Stony Brook (Souhegan River tributary), southern New Hampshire

=== Mid-Atlantic, United States ===
- Stony Brook (Delaware River), in Warren County, New Jersey
- Stony Brook (Fishing Creek tributary), in Columbia County, Pennsylvania
- Stony Brook (Flat Brook), a tributary of Flat Brook, in Sussex County, New Jersey
- Stony Brook (Green Brook), in central New Jersey
- Stony Brook (Mehoopany Creek), in northeastern Pennsylvania
- Stony Brook (Millstone River), in Mercer County, New Jersey
- Stony Brook (Schoharie Creek tributary), in Schoharie County, New York
