= Howard Murphy =

Howard Murphy may refer to:

- Howard Murphy (baseball) (1882–1926), Major League Baseball outfielder
- Howard Murphy (American football), American football coach in the United States
