= William D. Mullins =

American politician and baseball player (1931–1986)

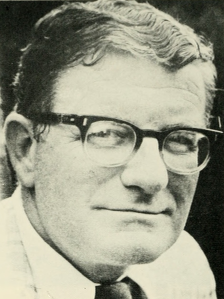
- Mullins in 1983

Member of the Massachusetts House of Representatives
- In office January 5, 1977 – March 2, 1986
- Preceded by: Steve T. Chmura
- Succeeded by: Thomas Petrolati
- Constituency: 20th Hampden (1976–1978); 7th Hampden (1978–1986)

Personal details
- Born: William David Mullins; August 13, 1931 Worcester, Massachusetts, U.S.
- Died: March 2, 1986 (aged 54) Ludlow, Massachusetts, U.S.
- Resting place: Island Pond Cemetery, Ludlow
- Party: Democratic
- Spouse: Kathleen Mullins (m. 1954)
- Children: 2
- Education: Providence College (BA); American International College; Westfield State University

Military service
- Branch/service: United States Army
- Years of service: 1954–1956

William David Mullins (August 13, 1931 – March 2, 1986) was an American politician, educator, and professional baseball player who served in the Massachusetts House of Representatives from 1977 until his death in 1986. A member of the Democratic Party, Mullins represented Ludlow and parts of Chicopee in the legislature.

After graduating from Providence College in 1953, Mullins signed with the Washington Senators as a pitcher, playing in their minor league farm system. However, due to poor performances and a series of injuries, Mullins had retired from professional baseball by 1957. After moving to the town of Ludlow the following year, Mullins became a teacher at the local high school, and he and his wife established a school for aphasiacs. Mullins was elected to the Ludlow board of selectmen in 1968, serving until his election to the state house in 1976.

Mullins was a very conservative Democrat, holding strong positions against abortion and gay rights. Despite his credentials as a "hard-nosed fiscal conservative", Mullins used his position in the legislature to advocate for local aid to many of the small cities and towns outside the Boston area. In 1985, Mullins was appointed vice chairman of the House Ways and Means Committee, a powerful position which allowed him to control all spending legislation in the House. By the end of his tenure, Mullins was described as being "one of Western Massachusetts's most powerful legislators".

The William D. Mullins Memorial Center at the University of Massachusetts Amherst opened in 1993, and was dedicated to Mullins for his support of the UMass athletics program in the legislature.

== Early life and education ==
William David Mullins was born in Worcester, Massachusetts on August 13, 1931, to Francis and Mary Vail Mullins. His father was a local attorney, while his uncle William E. Mullins was a longtime columnist for the Boston Herald.

Mullins attended Saint Stephen's High School in Worcester, where he played both basketball and baseball. Mullins was described as being "an outstanding basketball player, a strong defensive rebounder with a soft hook shot". In baseball, Mullins was a right-handed pitcher, and his fastball hit 90 miles per hour. Mullins was also physically large: standing at 6 feet 2 inches and weighing around 200 pounds, he was described as "big and burly".

After graduating high school in 1949, Mullins attended Providence College, having received an athletic scholarship to play on the baseball team. While at Providence College, Mullins was described as being "one of the top college pitchers in New England". In a 1953 game against a dominant University of Connecticut team, Mullins gave up just five hits while netting eight strikeouts; the Hartford Courant reported that he had a "dazzling curveball". In a 1952 game against Bates College, Mullins threw 17 strikeouts.

Mullins graduated from Providence College in 1953 with a bachelor's degree in economics. At some point, he also attended graduate school at American International College and Westfield State University.

== Professional baseball career ==
William "Moon" Mullins
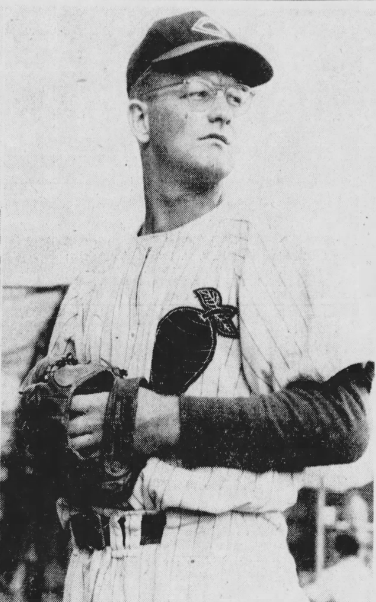
- Mullins in 1954 with the Charlotte Hornets
- Pitcher
- Batted: Right Threw: Right

MiLB debut
- July 19, 1953, for the Chattanooga Lookouts

Last MiLB appearance
- May 30, 1957, for the Wilson Tobs

MiLB statistics
- Win–loss record: 8–21
- Earned run average: 5.01

Teams
- Chattanooga Lookouts (1953); Charlotte Hornets (1954, 1957); Rock Hill Chiefs (1954); Kinston Eagles/Wilson Tobs (1957)

=== 1953 season ===
After graduating from Providence College, Mullins was expected to sign with the Cincinnati Reds, who had offered him a $15,000 contract. Mullins had also fielded an offer from the Cleveland Indians. However, Mullins ultimately signed a $6,000 contract with the Washington Senators in 1953 after being scouted by Ossie Bluege and Bill Lefebvre.

Nicknamed Moon Mullins during his baseball career, Mullins played in the Senators' farm system in the minor leagues. In summer 1953, Mullins joined the Chattanooga Lookouts, the Senators' affiliate team in Class AA. His professional debut was on July 19, 1953, in which he was called up as a relief pitcher in the fifth inning of a match against the Birmingham Barons. Mullins ended the 1953 season with a 1–1 game record and an 8.25 ERA.

=== 1954 season ===
Mullins played with the Lookouts during the 1954 spring training, but struggled to perform. During an exhibition game against the Hagerstown Owls, Mullins gave up five runs across three innings; in another match against the Barons, he gave up two runs in three innings. On March 28, 1954, Mullins was given on option to the Charlotte Hornets, the Class A affiliate of the Senators. The Charlotte Observer described the acquisition of Mullins as being "a prize catch", and he was considered to be the "hottest cookie" in the Hornets roster. Hornets manager Pete Appleton stated that Mullins had a "very good future as a pitcher". In April, Mullins pitched for three innings during an exhibition game against the New York Yankees, holding the Yankees to just one hit and no runs.

At the beginning of the 1954 season, Mullins had strong performances with the Hornets. In one game against the "powerful" Jacksonville Braves, Mullins managed eight scoreless innings; in another game against the Braves, he gave up just one run and five hits across eight innings. However, his performance decreased as the season progressed due to a lack of confidence, and he began clashing with Appleton. Mullins was ultimately sent down to the Rock Hill Chiefs in Class B on May 24, 1954, where his confidence further decreased. Mullins ended the 1954 season with a combined 5–16 record and a 4.58 ERA.

=== Military service and 1957 season ===
In late 1954, Mullins enlisted in the United States Army and was stationed in West Germany. He continued to play baseball in the army leagues, practicing new techniques with the hope to "atone for the mess [he] made in '54". Mullins left the army in early 1957 and was invited to the Lookouts spring training that year. By this point, his baseball career was practically over: "few people even know he's around", and though Mullins had gained the confidence he previously lacked, he had sustained several injuries throughout his career which hampered his play.

While pitching the first inning of an exhibition match, Mullins badly hurt his right shoulder and had to leave the game. His arm did not respond to treatment, and he was sent back to the Hornets by the end of March. Hornets manager Gene Verble admitted that it appeared there was something badly wrong with Mullins's shoulder. Mullins played one game for the Hornets before being placed on their disabled list in April. In May 1957, Mullins briefly played for the Kinston Eagles/Wilson Tobs in Class B, pitching in his five final professional games.

== Career in education ==
Mullins returned to Massachusetts by 1958, moving to the town of Ludlow. He continued playing baseball in the Tri-County League, a local amateur baseball circuit. Mullins pitched for Six Corners AC in 1958, and later became manager of the Indian Orchard Merchants. During this period, Mullins also coached several American Legion baseball teams.

Mullins became a teacher at Ludlow High School in 1958, teaching history and government. He also became the high school's baseball coach in 1964.

In 1971, Mullins and his wife Kathleen established the Children's Language Institute, a Ludlow-based non-profit organization which teaches children who are language and learning disabled. They established the institute after their daughter was diagnosed with aphasia; the only options for therapy were either to send her to a boarding school in Kansas or to move the entire family to Boston so she could attend the Horace Mann School. Originally run out of a rented room at a social center, by 1982 the institute had grown to occupy an elementary school building, had an enrollment of 30 students from across Massachusetts, and maintained a staff of professional speech-language pathologists. Between its establishment in 1971 and a feature in The Boston Globe in 1982, the institute had taught a total of 87 students.

== Political career ==
Mullins's political career began in 1968, when he was elected to the Ludlow board of selectmen. Mullins ran for selectman because he "became fed up with the State passing laws telling Ludlow to do such and such", and he pledged himself to the principle of home rule, stating that "the closest government is the best government". During his tenure as selectman, Mullins led the creation of a zoning law which prevented abortion clinics from operating in Ludlow, and oversaw a proposal which would have seen the construction of a $100 million oil power plant in the town. Mullins served as chairman of the board of selectmen in 1974 and 1975.

=== Elections ===
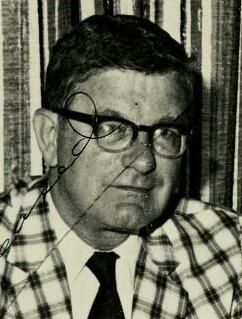
Mullins's legislative portrait in 1985

In 1972, Mullins, a member of the Democratic Party, ran for the Massachusetts House of Representatives. Mullins ran in the 2nd Hampden district, a heavily Democratic district containing Ludlow and Chicopee ward 6. Mullins was defeated in the Democratic primary by incumbent representative Steve T. Chmura; Chmura received 3,227 votes, while Mullins received 2,260.

Mullins ran for the state house again in 1976, running against Chmura in a primary rematch. Mullins ran in the redistricted 20th Hampden district, which consisted of Ludlow, the Three Rivers precinct in Palmer, and Precinct 6C in Chicopee. Mullins defeated Chmura in the rematch, initially winning by 17 votes. A recount later placed the tally at 3,191 votes for Mullins and 3,185 votes for Chmura, a margin of just six votes. Chmura filed a legal petition to overturn the result, alleging that electoral irregularities in the Palmer precinct affected the outcome of the election. Specifically, Chmura alleged that two members of the Republican Party were allowed to vote in the Democratic primary and that eight Democratic voters were "disenfranchised". The latter claim stems from a handful of misprinted ballots which incorrectly displayed candidates from a neighboring district; these ballots were removed and handed to a police officer, after which Chmura alleges they went missing. The Massachusetts Supreme Court re-affirmed Mullins's victory on October 19, citing "insufficient grounds to overturn the result". Mullins faced no Republican opposition in the general election, and though Chmura ran a write-in campaign, Mullins won with 94% of the vote.

Prior to the 1978 election, Mullins was redistricted to the 7th Hampden district due to the House being downsized from 240 to 160 representatives. The new district comprised Chicopee wards 4, 5, and 6, as well as all of Ludlow. In the Democratic primary, Mullins faced Chicopee alderman Paul J. Demears. During the campaign, Demears stated that Chicopee should not be represented by someone from Ludlow, as the three Chicopee wards made up a majority of the district's population. Demears also strongly criticized Mullins for his vote in favor of binding arbitration for police and firefighters, and stated that Mullins was not interested in the plight of the district. However, a back injury prevented Demears from campaigning in Ludlow, which was a stronghold for Mullins. Mullins campaigned on a platform of lowering property taxes and increasing the legal drinking age. Mullins defeated Demears in the primary with 5,058 votes to 2,604.

In the general election, Mullins faced independent candidate Lucille G. Ouimette, the president of the Chicopee board of aldermen. Ouimette ran a low-profile and low-budget campaign, with only three campaign workers, no media advertisements, and very few campaign contributions. The race drew little attention, though it briefly "heated up" when Ouimette refused a televised debate; Mullins stated that "the people deserved to know where she stands" on the issues, while Ouimette justified this by stating that her duties as aldermanic president took precedence over the campaign. Mullins campaigned on a platform of increasing local aid while also keeping government spending "responsible". Mullins ultimately defeated Ouimette, receiving 8,867 votes to Ouimette's 4,789. In both the primary and the general election, Mullins was narrowly defeated in the Chicopee portion of the district, but won overwhelmingly in Ludlow. Mullins ran unopposed in the 1980 election.

In the 1982 election, Mullins faced Republican nominee Walter J. Trybulski Jr., a lawyer and the son of a former mayor of Chicopee. Trybulski ran an aggressive campaign and attacked Mullins heavily, criticizing him for his votes in favor of a salary increase for legislators and to increase the financial aid given to Boston. However, Mullins largely ignored Trybulski's attacks and ran a positive campaign, focusing on $10 million of additional funds given to Chicopee during his tenure. Additionally, Trybulski fundraised poorly, expecting the Massachusetts Republican Party to fund his campaign; however, the party only gave him $30 for the entire campaign. Mullins defeated Trybulski in a "landslide", earning 10,830 votes compared to Trybulski's 2,887. Mullins was unopposed in his final election in 1984.

=== Tenure and death ===
Described as "feisty" and a "bomb-thrower", Mullins was an influential legislator who frequently bucked his party's leadership. For example, in the 1983 lame-duck session, Mullins led the backbenchers in opposition against special-interest legislation being pushed by Democratic leadership. With strong views against abortion and government spending, Mullins was described an "archconservative" and a "reactionary". In the 1980 Democratic Party presidential primary, Mullins supported President Jimmy Carter over U.S. Senator Ted Kennedy of Massachusetts, though this was out of an "adamant" opposition to Kennedy rather than an endorsement of Carter. Mullins stated that his conservative positions conflicted with Kennedy's liberal views on abortion and spending. When asked about his political leanings during a 1982 interview with the Holyoke Transcript-Telegram, Mullins replied: "I'm conservative as hell".

Mullins was assigned to the House Education Committee at the start of the 1977 session, and was also appointed to the Committee on Local Affairs in 1979. In 1983, Mullins joined a group of Democratic legislators who sought to oust House Speaker Thomas W. McGee in favor of reformer George Keverian, the House majority leader; though both were Democrats, McGee had been seen as "squelching the rights of rank and file members", and drew ire for his support for special-interests. McGee ultimately prevailed in the speakership election, receiving 95 votes to Keverian's 26.

Following the speakership contest, Mullins became a leader in the Keverian faction of the Massachusetts Democratic Party, serving as a top ally and key advisor to Keverian. In the speakership election for the 1985 legislative session, Keverian unseated McGee, receiving 90 votes compared to McGee's 43. Due to his loyalty, Mullins was offered the prominent position of House majority whip; however, Mullins instead opted to become vice chairman of the House Ways and Means Committee. Though this was a low-key position, it was very powerful, as it gave Mullins the ability to review and present all spending legislation in the House. Following this appointment, Mullins was described as being "one of Western Massachusetts's most powerful legislators".

On February 24, 1986, two months after being diagnosed with cancer, Mullins was admitted to Ludlow Hospital. Mullins died on March 2, 1986, at age 54. The House was adjourned for his funeral, which was attended by around 1,200 people. Among those in attendance were Governor Michael Dukakis; U.S. Representative Edward Boland; three busloads of state legislators; and Raymond Flynn and Richard Neal, the mayors of Boston and Springfield. Following his funeral at the Our Lady of Hope Church in Springfield, Mullins was interred at the Island Pond Cemetery in Ludlow. Keverian eulogized Mullins in the House, stating: "The Bill Mullins I knew was stubborn — sometimes irascible — painfully open and honest — always ready to do battle for a cause or person in which he believed. And at the same time, the Bill Mullins I knew was sensitive and caring — compassionate and considerate — a delight to be with one of those rare individuals who took their work seriously, but not themselves". Dukakis stated that Mullins was "a tireless fighter for the people he represented" and a "warrior for and in the Democratic Party".

A special election was not held for Mullins's open seat, leaving the seat vacant until the 1986 election, which was won by Democrat Thomas Petrolati.

=== Political positions ===
==== Abortion ====
Considered to be a "leader of the anti-abortion faction in the House", Mullins held strong anti-abortion views and was opposed to abortion in all cases, including rape and incest. In 1977, Mullins led a group of hardline representatives to successfully pass a bill which prohibited the use of state funds for abortions in all cases. When confronted by Republican state representative William G. Robinson over the rape and incest clause, Mullins countered by stating: "If you knew it was rape, would you kill the baby after it was born?" When a budget compromise containing a provision banning the public funding of abortions except in cases of rape and incest passed in the House the following year, Mullins declared it to be a "Pyrrhic victory".

In 1978, Mullins sponsored a controversial bill which would have increased the penalty for taking a girl out of the state to receive an abortion without parental consent to a maximum of five years in prison and a $2,000 fine. That year, Mullins voted in favor of all anti-abortion legislation, including a bill which would require abortion clinics to perform Rh factor testing prior to an abortion. As a result of his efforts during his first term in office, the Massachusetts Citizens for Life organization named Mullins the Pro-Life Legislator of the Year. During a state constitutional convention in 1984, Mullins voted in favor of an amendment to the Constitution of Massachusetts which codified the legislature's right to pass legislation regulating or prohibiting abortion, unless prevented by the federal government. Mullins had also supported adding a Human Life Amendment to the U.S. Constitution.

==== East-West divide in Massachusetts ====
Throughout his tenure in the House, Mullins advocated strongly for Western Massachusetts, which he saw as being neglected by the eastern-led state government. In 1981, Mullins led a successful rules change which limited the time the state house could be in session to between 10 a.m. and 10 p.m. Mullins stated that long marathon sessions were designed to "wear legislators down", and that this was particularly discriminatory towards western legislators, who had to commute an hour and a half to and from Boston every day, as the state did not reimburse legislators for hotel fees. Western legislators would frequently carpool to Boston together, with Mullins travelling with Republican representatives Walter A. DeFilippi and Steven Pierce; during these carpools, Mullins was described as being a "somewhat-salty standup comedian". The alliance between Mullins, DeFilippi, and Pierce led to the trio being dubbed "the Three Musketeers", and they would frequently work together on legislation.

Mullins was highly critical of Boston-area legislators, stating "you don't trust Boston politicians". He criticized the state for the amount of resources it gave to Boston, particularly the proposed bailout of the "financially crippled" Massachusetts Bay Transportation Authority. While some legislators proposed restructuring the MBTA to make it more fiscally responsible, Mullins opposed providing money "under any circumstances", stating that the MBTA was "the most inept operation in the state". Mullins equated Boston's political capital to its representation: Boston had a near-equal number of representatives as all of Western Massachusetts, with 19 representatives compared to the west's 23. Mullins also stated that due to Boston's reputation as "the car-theft capital of the world", drivers in Western Massachusetts were being forced to pay higher auto insurance rates.

However, the divide also offered benefits to the western legislators. In 1984, Governor Dukakis wanted to establish an independent water and sewage authority for Boston-area communities. As the bill would triple water bills in Eastern Massachusetts, Dukakis was forced to rely on the votes of the western legislators. Mullins led the western legislators in negotiations; with a political trump card, Mullins demanded the bill include a provision which would prevent the diversion of the Connecticut River to provide water for Boston and guarantee western representation on the authority.

==== Home rule and local aid ====
Though described as a "hard-nosed fiscal conservative", Mullins was a strong proponent of home rule and was considered to be an "expert on local aid". Mullins had "two goals as a representative: to aid Western Massachusetts and to cut the public's taxes". He was a prominent opponent of Massachusetts Proposition 2½, a voter-approved statute which limited the ability of municipalities to collect property taxes, leading to budget cuts in many of the small cities and town in Massachusetts. Mullins called the proposition "a joke", and stated its passage hurt local communities, who were being forced to cut essential programs, including trash and ambulance services. In 1981, Mullins filed a bill which would have required the state to give all the money it collected from the sales tax, around $350 million, to towns and cities in the form of local aid as a workaround to Proposition 2½. However, Mullins admitted that the bill would not succeed, as legislators did not want to weaken funding for state government departments.

Due to his support for local aid, Mullins was a frequent opponent of Governor Dukakis in the legislature. Mullins heavily criticized Dukakis for vetoing a bill which would have distributed $17.6 million in local aid to communities outside of Greater Boston, including $980,000 for Springfield and nearly $300,000 for Chicopee and Holyoke, with other communities also receiving "thousands of dollars". He also criticized Dukakis for a state plan to distribute emergency aid for school districts; Mullins argued that the funds were being distributed unfairly and accused Dukakis of favoritism. One method by which Mullins sought to improve local aid was to increase the rental fee for state use of county courthouses; this would thus put more state money directly in the hands of county governments. Two bills filed by Mullins which would have increased the amount allotted for rentals to $20 million were defeated in the Massachusetts Senate. Another attempt was initially passed in the House, but was defeated after House Democratic leadership urged members to reconsider.

Beginning in 1980, Mullins became a strong proponent for the construction of a new district courthouse in Chicopee Falls, which he described as a neglected "no-man's land", with the courthouse serving as a way to revitalize the neighborhood. However, Mullins efforts were opposed by both state and local officials; Mullins criticized city officials for preferring the upscale Chicopee Center neighborhood. Mullins also introduced legislation which would have seen the state pay Chicopee over $100,000 a year as payment in lieu of taxes for Chicopee Memorial State Park, and another bill which allowed Chicopee to increase its yearly tax levy by $820,000. Additionally, Mullins helped Chicopee receive a $1.5 million grant for the construction of a drainage system.

==== Law and crime ====
A staunch opponent of gay rights, Mullins opposed multiple bills which would have made it unlawful to discriminate against gay people in public employment and housing; opponents of these bills stated that their passage would turn Massachusetts into a "gay haven". Mullins also favored increasing restrictions on alcohol. Throughout his tenure, he supported multiple bills which increased the legal drinking age, stating that high schoolers were being harmed with the drinking age at 18. He also voted in favor of a bill which would have imposed a mandatory 30-day prison sentence for anyone convicted of obtaining alcohol for a minor. In 1979, Mullins was a member of the Legislative Commission on Alcohol Abuse, which investigated alcohol abuse and alcohol education. Mullins "ardently" supported the reinstatement of the death penalty, stating: "At some point, we have to stop worrying about those who murder and maim and be concerned about the victims and their families". He also supported mandatory sentences for violent crimes. Additionally, Mullins voted in favor of a bill which would prevent minors and people convicted of felonies or drug charges from owning guns.

In 1980, Mullins criticized power companies Northeast Utilities and Massachusetts Electric Company for their use of the pesticide Banvel-520, which contains the chemical 2,4-D, to clear foliage underneath power lines. Mullins petitioned the state pesticide board to require power companies to notify local officials 21 days prior to spraying; however, the board voted against the recommendation. In response, Mullins called the board "weak", and sponsored a successful bill requiring utility companies to notify communities before conducting sprays. Mullins introduced another bill in 1982 restricting the use of microcapsule pesticides which target the insects that damage apple and sweet corn crops, as these pesticides were inadvertently killing bees.

== Legacy ==
Following Mullins's death, several awards were created bearing his name. The Massachusetts Citizens for Life dedicated the William D. Mullins Award, which was to be given to politicians who are "supportive of the pro-life cause". The William D. Mullins Memorial Golf Tournament was established in Ludlow in his honor. The tournament awarded the William D. Mullins Man of the Year Award; among its recipients was UMass basketball coach John Calipari.

=== William D. Mullins Memorial Center ===
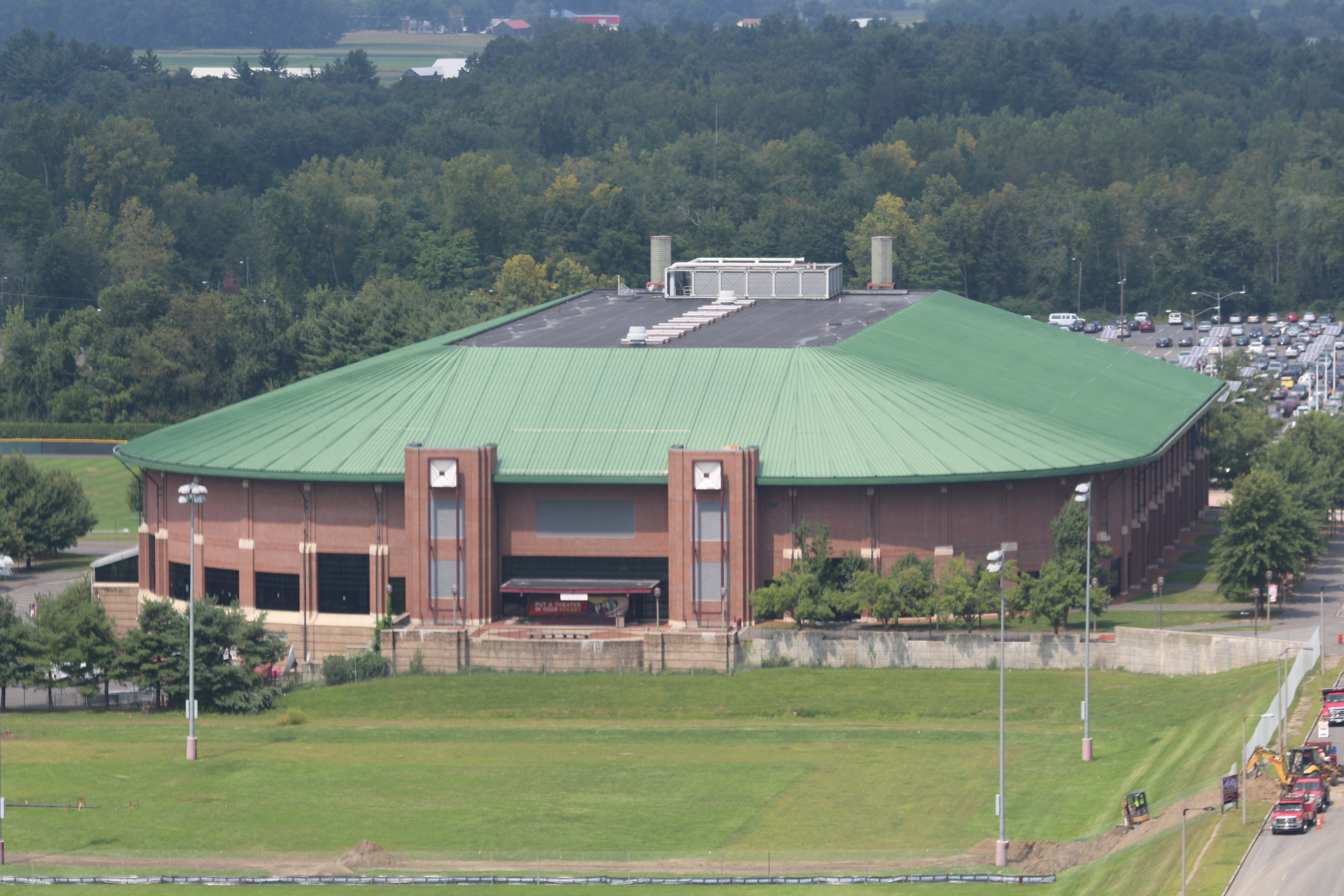
The Mullins Center in 2013.

Beginning in 1985, Mullins advocated for the construction of a new multi-purpose arena on the University of Massachusetts Amherst campus. Mullins argued that the university lacked an indoor facility capable of holding its 24,000 students and that the arena would help "expand the athletic program" at UMass. After his death the following year, Keverian and Massachusetts Senate president William Bulger introduced legislation which would set aside state funds in order to build the arena, which was to be named after Mullins. Mullins was also posthumously named an honorary alumnus of UMass by the university's alumni association due to his support for the UMass athletics program in the legislature.

The legislation to fund the arena struggled to get approved, failing several times in both the legislature and the UMass board of trustees. Legislators criticized the arena as pork-barrel spending, and stated that the legislature had recently financed an upgrade to the Curry Hicks Cage; one journalist stated that even Mullins would have voted against the bill as written. Additionally, despite his initial support, Bulger stalled the bill in the Senate for three years, using it to gain leverage over Keverian on other legislation. The arena bill ultimately passed in the legislature by 1989, with Suffolk Construction Company selected for the construction. Construction on the $50 million facility began in early 1991, and the 10,000-seat William D. Mullins Memorial Center formally opened in February 1993.

== Personal life ==
Mullins described himself as being a Roman Catholic of Irish descent. He and his wife Kathleen married in 1954 and had two children. Mullins was a member of the Knights of Columbus, the Elks, and the National Right to Life Committee.

Mullins was a longtime smoker, having smoked from the age of 17 until quitting in 1984. Mullins stated that "every time I'd pick up a cigarette, my teenage son and daughter would grab their throats", and that he quit smoking due to Kitty Dukakis's public struggle with addiction. The following year, Mullins supported a failed rule change which would have banned smoking in the House chamber.
