= Thomas Petrolati =

American politician

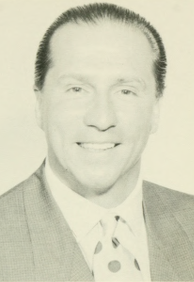

Member of the Massachusetts House of Representatives from the 7th Hampden district
- In office 1987–2021
- Preceded by: William D. Mullins
- Succeeded by: Jacob Oliveira

Personal details
- Born: March 16, 1957 (age 69) Springfield, Massachusetts, U.S.
- Party: Democratic
- Education: Western New England College

Thomas M. "Tommy" Petrolati (born March 16, 1957, in Springfield, Massachusetts) is an American politician who represented the 7th Hampden district in the Massachusetts House of Representatives and was a member of the Ludlow, Massachusetts Board of Selectmen from 1984 to 1986.

== Early life ==
Petrolati, the son of a paint and wallpaper store owner, grew up in Ludlow, Massachusetts. After graduating from Western New England College, he returned to Ludlow, where he worked for State Senator Martin Reilly and served on the town's board of selectmen. In 1986, he was elected to the Massachusetts House of Representatives.

== State representative ==
In April 1996 Petrolati helped Thomas Finneran build a coalition of Republicans and conservative Democrats to defeat House Majority Leader Richard A. Voke for the speakership. Finneran rewarded him with a leadership position.

From 2001 to 2005 Petrolati was the House Assistant Majority Whip and from 2005 to 2011 he was Speaker pro tempore.

=== Sexual misconduct allegations ===
In 1996, Jill Gagne a program director at the Ludlow Boys & Girls Club, filed a complaint with the Massachusetts Commission Against Discrimination claiming she was fired after she told supervisors she was sexually harassed by Petrolati, who was an honorary board member of the club, and complained about his advances.

According to Gagne, Petrolati sent her flowers with notes and called her constantly over a period of about six weeks in 1996. She said the conversations were "sexual" in nature and that he tried to persuade her to meet him in Boston.

The state commission found that Gagne had been fired for "inappropriate actions and comments" and ultimately dismissed the complaint against Petrolati.

During the State's investigation into patronage in the state's Probation Department, it was revealed that Petrolati may have used his influence at probation in an attempt to pressure a key witness in the case.

=== Redistricting committee ===
In 2001, Petrolati was chairman of the Joint Special Committee on Redistricting, which was created to revise the state's legislative boundaries. The committee's redrawn districts were struck down after a panel of judges found that they were racially biased in order to protect incumbents.

Petrolati later testified against Speaker Thomas Finneran after Finneran was charged with obstruction of justice in the legislative redistricting case.

During the lawsuit, Petrolati portrayed himself as disengaged from the redistricting process. He did not take any notes at public hearings, did not communicate with advocates, and did not know how to use the computer software that drew the redistricting maps.

=== Sale of insurance policies ===
From 2002 to 2004, Petrolati sold insurance policies to legislative colleagues, state employees, and private businesses without a license without disclosing any money earned from these sales to the state ethics commission or the Secretary of the Commonwealth. In 2004, Petrolati disclosed that his wife was a "shareholder/director" of Your Choice Insurance Agency. However, according to the Boston Globe, multiple sources with first-hand knowledge of the business state that it was Petrolati, not his wife, who sold the policies.

=== Ticket brokers ===
An investigation by the State Attorney General's office found that Petrolati was the main person that Richard Vitale, House Speaker Salvatore DiMasi's accountant, relied on during his illegal campaign to lobby for legislation benefiting ticket brokers. Petrolati was never charged in the case.

=== Patronage scandal ===
Petrolati did not seek re-appointment to the Speaker pro tempore position after an independent counsel's report revealed that he had gotten many of his supporters jobs in the Massachusetts Probation Department, including his wife, the husband of his chief of staff, a former legislative aide, and two of the aide's nieces.

In 2010, a report by the Boston Globe revealed that more than 100 Probation Department employees had made political contributions to Petrolati, including 19 of the 25 employees who run probation offices between Worcester and the New York border.

== See also ==
- 2019–2020 Massachusetts legislature
