= Steve Marino =

Steve Marino may refer to:

- Steve Marino (golfer)
- Steve Marino (politician)
- Steve Marino (American football)
