= Jack Murdock (American football) =

American football coach (1930–2007)

Biographical details
- Born: September 16, 1930; Shamokin, Pennsylvania, U.S.
- Died: September 16, 2007 (aged 77); Charlotte, Vermont, U.S.

Coaching career (HC unless noted)
- ?–1982: Holyoke HS (MA)
- 1983–1985: Shamokin HS (PA)
- 1986–1989: Westfield State

Head coaching record
- Overall: 19–18 (college)

Jack Murdock (September 16, 1930 – September 16, 2007) was an American football coach. He served as the head football coach Westfield State University in Westfield, Massachusetts for four seasons, from 1986 to 1989, compiling a record of 19–18.

Murdock was an assistant football coach at American International College in Springfield, Massachusetts, Holyoke High School in Holyoke, Massachusetts, and Chicopee High School in Chicopee, Massachusetts. He was later the head football coach at Holyoke before moving on Shamokin High School in Shamokin, Pennsylvania, where he served as head football coach for three seasons, from 1983 to 1985.

Murdock was born on September 16, 1930, in Shamokin. He died on September 16, 2007, in Charlotte, Vermont.

== Head coaching record ==
=== College ===
Year	Team	Overall	Conference	Standing	Bowl/playoffs
Westfield State Owls (New England Football Conference) (1986–1989)
1986	Westfield State	5–4	5–4	5th	
1987	Westfield State	6–3	3–2	T–2nd (South)	
1988	Westfield State	5–4	4–2	T–2nd (South)	
1989	Westfield State	3–7	3–3	T–2nd (South)	
Westfield State:		19–18	15–11		
Total:		19–18			
