= Fred Pereira =

Personal information
- Full name: Fred Pereira
- Date of birth: February 17, 1954 (age 72)
- Place of birth: Valdanta, Portugal
- Position: Forward

College career
Years	Team	Apps	(Gls)
1973–1976	Brown Bears		

Senior career*
Years	Team	Apps	(Gls)
1977	Fort Lauderdale Strikers	9	(3)
1977	Connecticut Bicentennials	13	(3)
1978	Colorado Caribous	12	(2)
1979	Atlanta Chiefs	8	(2)
1979–1980	Atlanta Chiefs (indoor)	12	(12)
1980–1981	Baltimore Blast (indoor)	11	(1)
1981	Phoenix Inferno (indoor)	9	(1)
1982–	Gremio Lusitano		

International career
1977	United States	6	(1)
- * Club domestic league appearances and goals

Fred "Fredy" Pereira (born February 17, 1954) is a former Portuguese-American soccer forward who spent three seasons in the North American Soccer League and earned six caps with the U.S. national team in 1977.

== High school and college ==
Born in Valdanta, Portugal, Pereira moved with his family to the United States when he was twelve. He attended Ludlow High School in Ludlow, Massachusetts and completed a post-graduate year at Suffield Academy, Suffield, Connecticut. In 2007 Ludlow High School inducted Pereira into its Athletic Hall of Fame. At Suffield, along with Gambian teammate Daniel Njie, Pereira led the team to the New England Prep Championship. After high school, he attended Brown University where he played as a forward on the men's soccer team from 1973 to 1976. In 1974, Pereira set a Brown record with twenty-four goals and seven assists as Brown won the Ivy League title. The next season, Brown went to the NCAA Final Four where it fell to the University of San Francisco. In 1974 and 1976, Pereira was named a first team All American.

== National team ==
His scoring exploits with Brown led to his selection for several U.S. national and Olympic team games in 1977. On September 15, 1977, Pereira earned his first caps when he came on for Steve Ralbovsky in a 2–1 win over El Salvador. He continued to play somewhat regularly, usually as a substitute, for the next two months. On October 10, 1977, he scored his only goal with the national team, the gamewinner in a 1–0 victory over China. His last cap came six days later when he came on for Ralbovsky in a 2–1 victory over China.

== Professional ==
In 1977, the Fort Lauderdale Strikers of the North American Soccer League (NASL) selected Pereira in the first round (second overall) of the NASL College Draft. While he began the season with the Strikers, scoring three goals in nine games, the team traded him mid-season to the Connecticut Bicentennials. At the end of the 1977 season, the Bicentennials moved to Oakland, California, but Pereira moved to the Colorado Caribous. At the end of the 1978 season, the Caribous also moved, but this time Pereira went with his team, spending the 1979 season with his team, now known as the Atlanta Chiefs. After the 1979–80 NASL indoor season he left the league. In 1980, he signed with the Baltimore Blast of the Major Indoor Soccer League. The Blast traded him to the Phoenix Inferno during the season. Suffering from a string of injuries, Pereira retired at the end of the season and moved his family back to Ludlow where he continued to play amateur soccer with Gremio Lusitano where he played for 11 years.

Pereira now serves as an NCAA college soccer referee.
