= Lou Conte =

American football coach (born c. 1982)

Current position
- Title: Head coach
- Team: Westfield State
- Conference: MASCAC
- Record: 7–13

Biographical details
- Born: c. 1982 (age 43–44); Agawam, Massachusetts, U.S.
- Education: Springfield College (2004, 2010); The Citadel (2022)

Playing career

Football
- 2001–2004: Springfield

Coaching career (HC unless noted)

Football
- 2006–2007: Maine Maritime (OL)
- 2008–2009: Springfield (GA)
- 2010: Williston Northampton HS (MA) (DC)
- 2011–2013: Lenoir–Rhyne (RB/ST)
- 2014: The Citadel (RB)
- 2015: Springfield (co-OC/QB)
- 2016–2022: The Citadel (OC/QB/FB)
- 2023: American International
- 2024–present: Westfield State

Lacrosse
- 2006–2007: Maine Maritime
- 2010: Williston Northampton HS (MA) (assistant)

Wrestling
- 2010: Williston Northampton HS (MA) (JV)

Administrative career (AD unless noted)
- 2010: Williston Northampton HS (MA) (assistant)

Head coaching record
- Overall: 10–21 (football); 15–17 (lacrosse)

Lou Conte Jr. (born c. 1982) is an American college football coach. He is the head football coach for Westfield State University, a position he has held since 2024. He was the head football coach for American International College in 2023. He previously coached for Maine Maritime, Springfield, Williston Northampton School, Lenoir–Rhyne, and The Citadel. He also coached men's lacrosse for Maine Maritime and Williston Northampton School.

== Head coaching record ==
=== Football ===
Year	Team	Overall	Conference	Standing	Bowl/playoffs
American International Yellow Jackets (Northeast-10 Conference) (2023)
2023	American International	3–8	2–6	8th	
American International:		3–8	2–6		
Westfield State Owls (Massachusetts State Collegiate Athletic Conference) (2024–present)
2024	Westfield State	4–6	4–5	6th	
2025	Westfield State	3–7	3–6	T–7th	
2026	Westfield State	0–0	0–0		
Westfield State:		7–13	7–11		
Total:		10–21			
