= Steve Marino (American football) =

American football coach

Coaching career (HC unless noted)
- 1979–1986: Ludlow HS (MA)
- 1987: Western New England (DC)
- 1988–1989: Ludlow HS (MA) (assistant)
- 1990–2013: Westfield State

Head coaching record
- Overall: 119–115–1 (college)
- Tournaments: 0–1 (NCAA D-III playoffs)

Accomplishments and honors

Championships
- 1 NEFC (2001); 3 NEFC Bogan Division (2001–2003)

Steve Marino (born August 24, 1949) is an American former football coach. He served as the head football coach at Westfield State University in Westfield, Massachusetts, from 1990 to 2013, compiling a record of 119–115–1. In 2018, Marino was inducted into the Westfield State University athletics Hall of Fame.

== Head coaching record ==
Year	Team	Overall	Conference	Standing	Bowl/playoffs
Westfield State Owls (New England Football Conference) (1990–2012)
1990	Westfield State	3–7	2–4	T–4th (South)	
1991	Westfield State	4–6	3–3	4th (South)	
1992	Westfield State	6–3	5–3	T–3rd	
1993	Westfield State	7–2–1	6–2	2nd	
1994	Westfield State	5–5	4–4	5th	
1995	Westfield State	3–6	3–5	T–5th	
1996	Westfield State	4–6	4–4	T–5th	
1997	Westfield State	4–6	4–4	T–4th	
1998	Westfield State	5–5	2–4	T–5th (Red)	
1999	Westfield State	4–6	3–3	4th (Red)	
2000	Westfield State	3–6	2–4	T–5th (Bogan)	
2001	Westfield State	10–1	6–0	1st (Bogan)	L NCAA Division III First Round
2002	Westfield State	8–3	6–0	1st (Bogan)	
2003	Westfield State	7–3	6–0	1st (Bogan)	
2004	Westfield State	5–4	4–2	T–2nd (Bogan)	
2005	Westfield State	4–5	2–4	5th (Bogan)	
2006	Westfield State	1–8	1–6	T–7th (Bogan)	
2007	Westfield State	5–4	4–3	T–3rd (Bogan)	
2008	Westfield State	6–4	4–3	T–3rd (Bogan)	
2009	Westfield State	7–3	5–2	T–2nd (Bogan)	
2010	Westfield State	5–5	4–3	T–3rd (Bogan)	
2011	Westfield State	5–5	4–3	4th (Bogan)	
2012	Westfield State	3–7	2–5	6th (Bogan)	
Westfield State Owls (Massachusetts State Collegiate Athletic Conference) (2013)
2013	Westfield State	5–5	4–4	5th	
Westfield State:		119–115–1	90–75		
Total:		119–115–1			
National championship Conference title Conference division title or championship game berth
