= Ludlow Clock Tower =

Clock tower in Ludlow, Massachusetts

Coordinates: 42.1564°N 72.4808°W

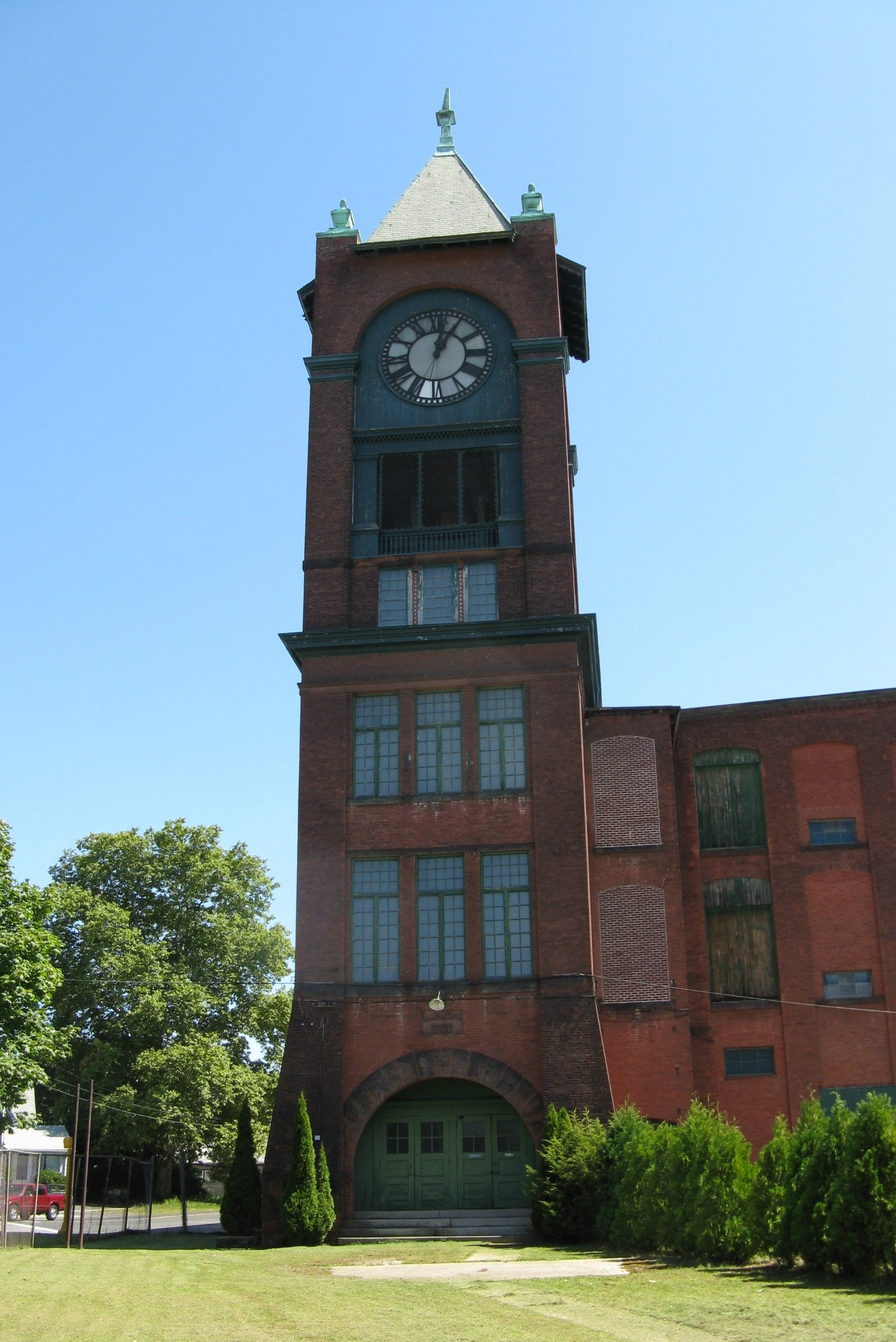
Ludlow Clock Tower

The Ludlow Clock Tower is a clock tower located in Ludlow, Massachusetts. The tower is part of the Ludlow Mills complex, and is depicted as part of the town seal. The tower was constructed as part of the complex in 1886 by the Ludlow Manufacturing and Sales Company.

== Present use ==
Ludlow Mills ceased operation in the 1960s and the building, although occupied by various tenants since, has deteriorated. In late 2011, it was announced that the complex had been purchased by WestMass Area Development Corporation for $7 million. The company plans to sell some of the space to HealthSouth Rehabilitation Hospital and some buildings to WinnDevelopment for senior housing.
