= Deerlick Run =

Coordinates: 41.091143°N 76.461661°W

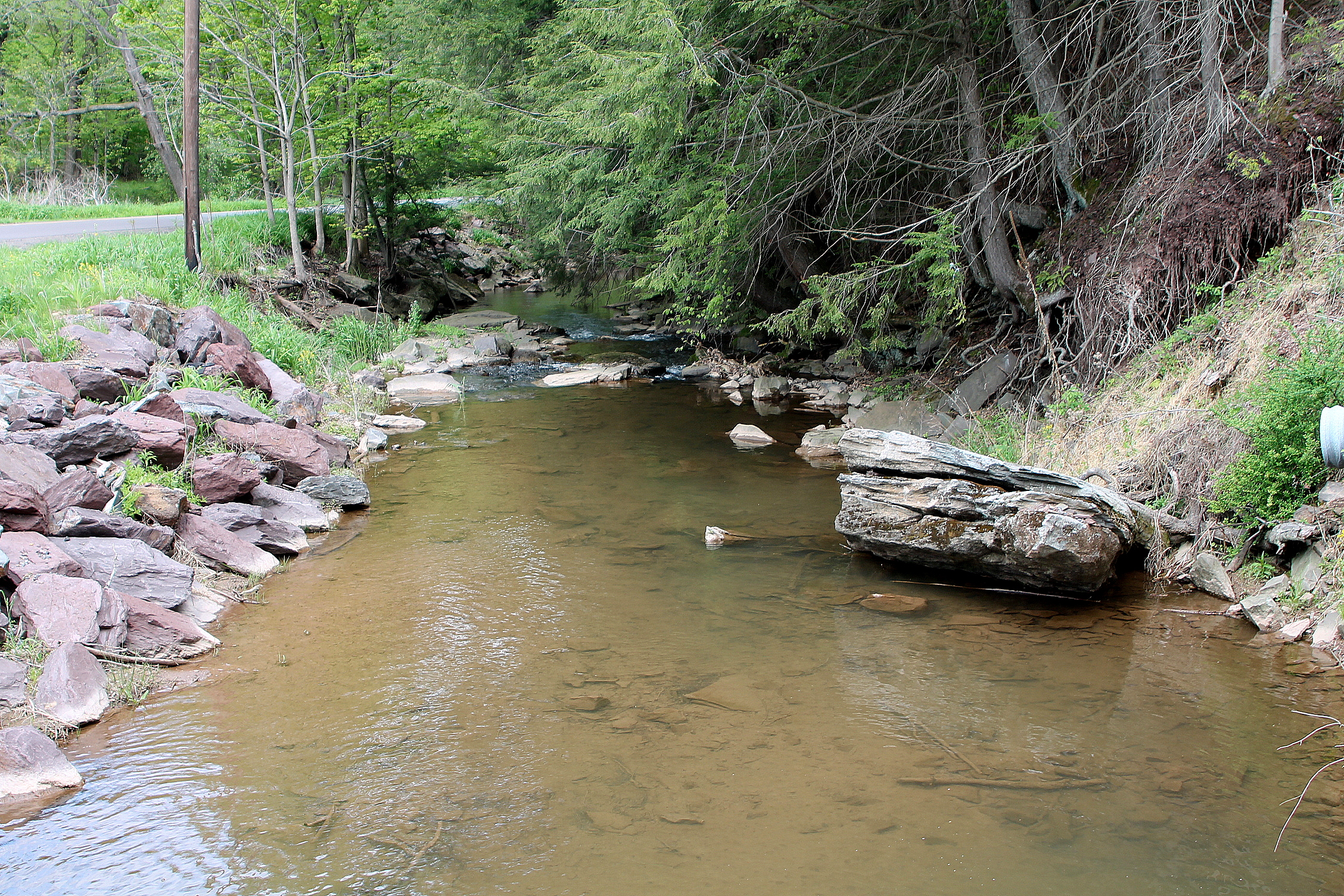
- Deerlick Run from Whites Church Road looking downstream

Physical characteristics
- Source
  - location: Mount Pleasant Township, Columbia County, Pennsylvania
- Mouth
  - location: Orange Township at Fishing Creek
  - elevation: less than 600 feet (180 m) above sea level
- Length: 3.8 mi (6.1 km)
- Basin size: 6.1 mi^{2} (16 km^{2})

Basin features
- Progression: Deerlick Run → Fishing Creek → Susquehanna River → Chesapeake Bay

Deerlick Run (also known as Deer Lick Run) is a tributary of Fishing Creek in Columbia County, Pennsylvania, in the United States. It is 3.8 miles (6.1 km) long. The stream flows through Mount Pleasant Township and Orange Township. The annual load of sediment in it is 8,522,400.0 pounds (3,865,695.6 kg). The stream's watershed has an area of 6.1 square miles, most of which is agricultural land. There are also large areas of forested land in the watershed.

== Course ==
Deerlick Run starts in northern Mount Pleasant Township, near the community of Welliversville. It flows southeast for a number of miles in a fairly shallow valley to the eastern part of Mount Pleasant Township. Here, the stream turns eastward and exits Mount Pleasant Township. Upon exiting the township, it enters Orange Township. The stream then exits its valley and enters a plain. Shortly afterwards, it reaches its confluence with Fishing Creek. The confluence is slightly north of Pennsylvania Route 487 and slightly south of a gauging station.

Deerlick Run has no named tributaries.

== Hydrology and climate ==
The daily load of sediment in Deerlick Run is 23,349.0 pounds (10,590.9 kg), which equates to an annual load of 8,522,400.0 pounds (3,865,695.6 kg). The total maximum daily load for sediment in the stream is 14,599.0 pounds (6,622.0 kg) per day, or 5,328,648.0 pounds (2,417,034.1 kg) per year. 7,898,600 pounds (3,582,700 kg) of sediment per year comes from croplands and 451,600 pounds (204,800 kg) comes from pastures or hay. 90,000 pounds (41,000 kg) comes from stream banks, 40,800 pounds (18,500 kg) comes from land classified as "transition" by the Pennsylvania Department of Environmental Protection, 23,200 pounds (10,500 kg) comes from forests, and 18,200 pounds (8,300 kg) comes from land classified as "low-intensity development" by the Pennsylvania Department of Environmental Protection.

Deerlick Run experiences significant levels of siltation and stream bank erosion. The erosion coefficient of Deerlick Run ranges from 0.12 between September and March to 0.3 during the rest of the year.

The average annual precipitation in the Deerlick Run watershed is 37.7 inches (96 cm). The average runoff rate in the watershed is 1.8 inches (4.6 cm) per year.

Deerlick Run has little riparian buffering. No part of the stream or any of its tributaries attains the water quality standards of the Pennsylvania Department of Environmental Protection.

== Geography and geology ==
The minimum elevation in the watershed of Deerlick Run is less than 600 feet (180 m) and the maximum elevation is more than 1,100 feet (340 m) above sea level. The stream is in the ridge and valley geographical region.

80 percent of the surface rock in the watershed of Deerlick Run is interbedded sedimentary rock. 20 percent of the surface rock is sandstone The dominant hydrologic soil groups in the Deerlick Run watershed are C (90%) and B (10%).

== Watershed ==
The watershed of Deerlick Run has an area of 6.1 square miles. There are 8.5 miles (13.7 km) of streams in its watershed.

The majority of the watershed of Deerlick Run (60.8 percent) is agricultural land. 1134.2 acres are used for hay or pastures and 1213.3 acres are used for crops. 34.9 percent of the watershed's land is forested land. 4.0 percent of the land is designated by the Pennsylvania Department of Environmental Protection as "low-intensity development". 0.3 percent of the watershed's area is wetland. 9.9 acres of land in the watershed are classified as "transitional" by the Pennsylvania Department of Environmental Protection.

== History ==
In 1853, Deerlick Run was part of the border between Columbia County and Montour County. However, in the 21st century, it is near the center of Columbia County.

In the past, the valley of Deerlick Run was home to many industries, although little is known about them. The remains of a dam can be seen on the stream and there was once a gin mill, a sawmill, and a woolen mill. A mill known as the Behm Mill was built on the stream in 1801. An ice house also was once built near the stream.

== Biology ==
Deerlick Run is designated as a coldwater fishery because it can support fish species of the family Salmonidae. It is also designated as a migratory fishery because it is in the Susquehanna River watershed.

== See also ==
- List of tributaries of Fishing Creek (North Branch Susquehanna River)
- Green Creek (Fishing Creek)
- Stony Brook (Fishing Creek)
