= Pete Kowalski =

American football coach

Biographical details
- Born: 1954 (age 71–72); Wilbraham, Massachusetts, U.S.
- Education: University of Massachusetts Amherst (1977)

Coaching career (HC unless noted)

Football
- 1981–1989: Bulkeley HS (CT) (assistant)
- 1990–1995: Bulkeley HS (CT) (DC)
- 1996–2013: Westfield State (DC/LB)
- 2014–2023: Westfield State

Track and field
- 1985–1993: Bulkeley HS (CT) (assistant)
- 1994–2013: Bulkeley HS (CT)

Basketball

Head coaching record
- Overall: 25–65 (college football)

Pete Kowalski is an American former college football coach. He was the head football coach at Westfield State University in Westfield, Massachusetts from 2014 to 2023. He was named interim head coach of Westfield State Owls football team in December 2013. He was appointed to the role on a permanent basis the following May. He previously coached at Bulkeley High School in Hartford, Connecticut.

Kowalski's wife and daughter died in the spring of 2024.

== Head coaching record ==
=== College football ===
Year	Team	Overall	Conference	Standing	Bowl/playoffs
Westfield State Owls (Massachusetts State Collegiate Athletic Conference) (2014–2023)
2014	Westfield State	5–5	4–4	T–4th	
2015	Westfield State	2–8	1–7	T–8th	
2016	Westfield State	2–8	1–7	9th	
2017	Westfield State	3–7	3–5	6th	
2018	Westfield State	5–5	4–4	T–5th	
2019	Westfield State	2–8	2–6	7th	
2020–21	No team—COVID-19				
2021	Westfield State	1–9	1–7	8th	
2022	Westfield State	2–8	2–6	7th	
2023	Westfield State	3–7	3–5	6th	
Westfield State:		25–65	21–51		
Total:		25–65			
