= Stony Brook Power Plant =

- Country: United States
- Coordinates: 42°11′45″N 72°30′15″W
- Status: Operational
- Commission date: 1981
- Owners: Massachusetts Municipal Wholesale Electric Company, Green Mountain Power Corporation, Lyndonville, Vermont
- Operator: Glenn Corbiere

Power generation
- Units operational: 2
- Units planned: 1
- Nameplate capacity: 517 Megawatts (MW)
- Capacity factor: 85.7%

External links
- Website: Official Website

The Stony Brook Power Plant is a petroleum-fired power station located in Ludlow, MA on a 350-acre site.

It is owned by a number of parties, but 90.75% of it is owned by the Massachusetts Municipal Wholesale Electric Company (MMWEC). The plant consists of two generating units. The Stony Brook Intermediate Unit generates 354 MW of electricity with its three combined-cycle turbines that can burn either petroleum or natural gas. The Stony Brook Peaking Unit is a 172 MW peaking unit which runs during periods on high demand using petroleum. These units provide electricity to 24 municipalities in Massachusetts.

== History ==
Since 1976, the plant has been financed with a number of bonds that have granted partial ownership to the Green Mountain Power Corporation and the town of Lyndonville, Vermont. The first unit was constructed in 1981 with the second unit being constructed the following year in 1982. Originally the units were designed with the intention of running solely on petroleum, but were later converted to dual-fuel in 1983 when natural gas became available.

In 2006, MMWEC began considering the construction of a third combined-cycle natural gas 280 MW unit. It received approval from the Ludlow Board of Selectmen the same year with the expected date of completion in mid-2010. The unit has not yet been completed, as MMWEC has cited a need for additional funding before the project is can be completed. The town does not plan to provide this funding. Additionally, recent maintenance has extended the lifespan of the plant through 2030.
