= Westfield State Owls football =

College football team

- First season: 1982; 44 years ago
- Athletic director: Richard Lenfest
- Head coach: Lou Conte; 2nd season, 7–13 (.350)
- Location: Westfield, Massachusetts
- Stadium: Alumni Field (capacity: 4,000)
- NCAA division: Division III
- Conference: MASCAC
- Colors: Blue, white, and gold
- All-time record: 178–224–1 (.443)
- Bowl record: 0–1 (.000)

Conference championships
- 1

Conference division championships
- 3
- Mascot: Owl
- Website: westfieldstateowls.com

The Westfield State Owls football team represents Westfield State University in college football at the NCAA Division III level. The Owls are members of the Massachusetts State Collegiate Athletic Conference, fielding its team in the Massachusetts State Collegiate Athletic Conference since 2013. The Owls play their home games at Alumni Field in Westfield, Massachusetts.

Their head coach is Lou Conte, who took over the position for the 2024 season.

== Conference affiliations ==
- New England Football Conference (1982–2012)
- Massachusetts State Collegiate Athletic Conference (2013–present)

== Championships ==
=== Conference championships ===
Westfield State claims 1 conference title, which came in 2001.

Year	Conference	Overall Record	Conference Record	Coach
2001	New England Football Conference	10–1	6–0	Steve Marino

† Co-champions

=== Division championships ===
Westfield State claims 3 division titles, the most recent of which came in 2003.

Year	Division	Coach	Overall Record	Conference Record	Opponent	CG result
2001	NEFC Bogan	Steve Marino	10–1	6–0	Nichols	W 12–0
2002	NEFC Bogan	Steve Marino	8–3	6–0	UMass Dartmouth	L 0–16
2003	NEFC Bogan	Steve Marino	7–3	6–0	Curry	L 0–36

† Co-champions

== Postseason games ==
=== NCAA Division III playoff games ===
Westfield State has appeared in the Division III playoffs one time, with an overall record of 0–1.

Year	Round	Opponent	Result
2001	First Round	Western Connecticut	L, 7–8

=== Bowl games ===
Westfield State has participated in one bowl game, and has a record of 0–1.

Season	Coach	Bowl	Opponent	Result
2002	Steve Marino	ECAC Bowl	Cortland	L 7–30

== List of head coaches ==
=== Key ===
Key to symbols in coaches list
General		Overall		Conference		Postseason (Note: Although the first Rose Bowl Game was played in 1902, it has been continuously played since the 1916 game, and is recognized as the oldest bowl game by the NCAA. "—" indicates any season prior to 1916 when postseason games were not played.)	
No.	Order of coaches (Note: A running total of the number of head coaches, with coaches who served separate tenures being counted only once. Interim head coaches are represented with "Int" and are not counted in the running total. "—" indicates the team played but either without a coach or no coach is on record. "X" indicates an interim year without play.)	GC	Games coached	CW	Conference wins	PW	Postseason wins
DC	Division championships	OW	Overall wins	CL	Conference losses	PL	Postseason losses
CC	Conference championships	OL	Overall losses	CT	Conference ties	PT	Postseason ties
NC	National championships	OT	Overall ties (Note: Overtime rules in college football were introduced in 1996, making ties impossible in the period since.)	C%	Conference winning percentage		
†	Elected to the College Football Hall of Fame	O%	Overall winning percentage (Note: When computing the win–loss percentage, a tie counts as half a win and half a loss.)				

=== Coaches ===
List of head football coaches showing season(s) coached, overall records, conference records, postseason records, championships and selected awards
No.	Name	Season(s)	GC	OW	OL	OT	O%	CW	CL	CT	C%	PW	PL	PT	DC	CC	NC	Awards
1	Roger LeClerc	1982	9	2	7	0	0.222	2	7	0	0.222	0	0	0	0	0	0	0
2	Howard Murphy	1983–1985	28	11	17	0	0.393	11	17	0	0.393	0	0	0	0	0	0	0
3	Jake Murdock	1986–1989	37	19	18	0	0.514	15	11	0	0.577	0	0	0	0	0	0	0
4	Steve Marino	1990–2013	235	119	115	1	0.509	90	75	0	0.545	0	1	0	3	1	0	0
5	Pete Kowalski	2014–2023	82	22	60	0	0.268	18	46	0	0.250	0	0	0	0	0	0	0

== Year-by-year results ==
National champions	Conference champions	Bowl game berth	Playoff berth

Season	Year	Head Coach	Association	Division	Conference	Record							Postseason	Final ranking
Season	Year	Head Coach	Association	Division	Conference	Overall			Conference				Postseason	Final ranking
Season	Year	Head Coach	Association	Division	Conference	Win	Loss	Tie	Finish	Win	Loss	Tie	Postseason	Final ranking
Westfield State Owls
1982	1982	Roger LeClerc	NCAA	Division III	NEFC	2	7	0	T–8th	2	7	0	—	—
1983	1983	Howard Murphy	NCAA	Division III	NEFC	2	7	0	9th	2	7	0	—	—
1984	1984	Howard Murphy	NCAA	Division III	NEFC	4	5	0	5th	4	5	0	—	—
1985	1985	Howard Murphy	NCAA	Division III	NEFC	4	5	0	T–6th	4	5	0	—	—
1986	1986	Jack Murdock	NCAA	Division III	NEFC	5	4	0	5th	5	4	0	—	—
1987	1987	Jack Murdock	NCAA	Division III	NEFC	6	3	0	T–2nd (South)	3	2	0	—	—
1988	1988	Jack Murdock	NCAA	Division III	NEFC	5	4	0	T–2nd (South)	4	2	0	—	—
1989	1989	Jack Murdock	NCAA	Division III	NEFC	3	7	0	T–2nd (South)	3	3	0	—	—
1990	1990	Steve Marino	NCAA	Division III	NEFC	3	7	0	T–4th (South)	2	4	0	—	—
1991	1991	Steve Marino	NCAA	Division III	NEFC	4	6	0	4th (South)	3	3	0	—	—
1992	1992	Steve Marino	NCAA	Division III	NEFC	6	3	0	T–3rd	5	3	0	—	—
1993	1993	Steve Marino	NCAA	Division III	NEFC	7	2	1	2nd	6	2	0	—	—
1994	1994	Steve Marino	NCAA	Division III	NEFC	5	5	0	5th	4	4	0	—	—
1995	1995	Steve Marino	NCAA	Division III	NEFC	3	6	0	T–5th	3	5	0	—	—
1996	1996	Steve Marino	NCAA	Division III	NEFC	4	6	0	T–5th	4	4	0	—	—
1997	1997	Steve Marino	NCAA	Division III	NEFC	4	6	0	T–4th	4	4	0	—	—
1998	1998	Steve Marino	NCAA	Division III	NEFC	5	5	0	T–5th (Red)	2	4	0	—	—
1999	1999	Steve Marino	NCAA	Division III	NEFC	4	6	0	4th (Red)	3	3	0	—	—
2000	2000	Steve Marino	NCAA	Division III	NEFC	3	6	0	T–5th (Bogan)	2	4	0	—	—
2001	2001	Steve Marino	NCAA	Division III	NEFC	10	1	0	1st (Bogan)	6	0	0	L NCAA Division III First Round	—
2002	2002	Steve Marino	NCAA	Division III	NEFC	8	3	0	1st (Bogan)	6	0	0	—	—
2003	2003	Steve Marino	NCAA	Division III	NEFC	7	3	0	1st (Bogan)	6	0	0	—	—
2004	2004	Steve Marino	NCAA	Division III	NEFC	5	4	0	T–2nd (Bogan)	4	2	0	—	—
2005	2005	Steve Marino	NCAA	Division III	NEFC	4	5	0	5th (Bogan)	2	4	0	—	—
2006	2006	Steve Marino	NCAA	Division III	NEFC	1	8	0	T–7th (Bogan)	1	6	0	—	—
2007	2007	Steve Marino	NCAA	Division III	NEFC	5	4	0	T–3rd (Bogan)	4	3	0	—	—
2008	2008	Steve Marino	NCAA	Division III	NEFC	6	4	0	T–3rd (Bogan)	4	3	0	—	—
2009	2009	Steve Marino	NCAA	Division III	NEFC	7	3	0	T–2nd (Bogan)	5	2	0	—	—
2010	2010	Steve Marino	NCAA	Division III	NEFC	5	5	0	T–3rd (Bogan)	4	3	0	—	—
2011	2011	Steve Marino	NCAA	Division III	NEFC	5	5	0	4th (Bogan)	4	3	0	—	—
2012	2012	Steve Marino	NCAA	Division III	NEFC	3	7	0	6th (Bogan)	2	5	0	—	—
2013	2013	Steve Marino	NCAA	Division III	MASCAC	5	5	0	5th	4	4	0	—	—
2014	2014	Pete Kowalski	NCAA	Division III	MASCAC	5	5	0	T–4th	4	4	0	—	—
2015	2015	Pete Kowalski	NCAA	Division III	MASCAC	2	8	0	T–8th	1	7	0	—	—
2016	2016	Pete Kowalski	NCAA	Division III	MASCAC	2	8	0	9th	1	7	0	—	—
2017	2017	Pete Kowalski	NCAA	Division III	MASCAC	3	7	0	6th	3	5	0	—	—
2018	2018	Pete Kowalski	NCAA	Division III	MASCAC	5	5	0	T–5th	4	4	0	—	—
2019	2019	Pete Kowalski	NCAA	Division III	MASCAC	2	8	0	7th	2	6	0	—	—
Season canceled due to COVID-19
2021	2021	Pete Kowalski	NCAA	Division III	MASCAC	1	9	0	8th	1	7	0	—	—
2022	2022	Pete Kowalski	NCAA	Division III	MASCAC	2	8	0	7th	2	6	0	—	—
2023	2023	Pete Kowalski	NCAA	Division III	MASCAC								—	—
