= Ludlow High School =

Public school in Ludlow, Massachusetts, United States

Location
- 500 Chapin Street; Ludlow, Massachusetts 01056; United States
- Coordinates: 42°10′20″N 72°27′56″W

Information
- Type: Public; Coeducational; Open enrollment
- Teaching staff: 69.50 (FTE)
- Grades: 9–12
- Average class size: 15.1
- Student to teacher ratio: 10.79
- Colors: Maroon and White
- Sports: Cheerleading, Cross Country, Football, Golf, Soccer, Girls' Volleyball (Fall) Basketball, Ice Hockey, Skiing, Swimming, Wrestling (Winter) Baseball, Softball, Tennis, Track & Field, Boys' Volleyball (Spring)
- Mascot: The Ludlow Lion
- Team name: Lions
- Publication: The Paw Literary Magazine
- Newspaper: The Cub
- Yearbook: The Lion
- Communities served: Ludlow
- Website: http://www.ludlowps.org/

Ludlow High School is the public high school of Ludlow, Massachusetts, United States, located at 500 Chapin Street. It is next to Ludlow Town Hall. The high school is the only public high school in the town and services all of its residents. Ludlow high school normally scores close to the state average on standardized tests such as Massachusetts' MCAS and the SAT Reasoning Test.

Ludlow High School is well known for its sporting teams in soccer, cross country, track and field, and wrestling. The town's most popular sport traditionally is soccer thanks to Ludlow's large Portuguese-American population. The high school's soccer team has won 18 Massachusetts state championships, with the most recent one in 2018, when they beat Wellesley Raiders 1-0 in the championship game in OT. Ludlow's talent for soccer has been particularly clear in recent years, as they have made four straight appearances in the Massachusetts state championship game, winning three of them (2008, 2010, and 2011). The high school and town's tradition of soccer excellence earned it a spot in the National Soccer Hall of Fame in 1996.

The cross country team also has won multiple Western Massachusetts championships in recent years, most recently in 2009. The track and field team saw great success with a streak of meet wins stretching seven seasons from 2003-2009. The school's wrestling team won the Western Massachusetts championship every year 1998-2004 and the state championship in 2003. The school plays Palmer in its annual Thanksgiving football game.

The school's newspaper, titled The Cub, is student run and comes out monthly, it is distributed throughout the community to keep the citizens of the community informed about events at the school. The newspaper was in final consideration for an appearance on the MTV reality show The Paper. MTV also came to Ludlow High for auditions of Made but they did not select a participant.

== Notable alumni ==
- Nicholas Humber, former Enron executive and September 11, 2001 victim as he was on American Airlines Flight 11.
- Dean Lombardi, 2x Stanley Cup Winning General Manager of the Los Angeles Kings.
- Tom Matera, World Wrestling Entertainment Superstar, known as Antonio Thomas.
- Fred Pereira, professional soccer player.
- John F. Thompson, Massachusetts state representative, served as Massachusetts Speaker of the House.
- Maura West, actress, known for her role in As the World Turns.
- Jacob Oliveira of the Massachusetts House of Representatives, who serves the 7th Hampden District.

== Notable faculty ==
- William D. Mullins (1931–1986), member of the Massachusetts House of Representatives
