= Howard Murphy (American football) =

American football coach (1944–2023)

Biographical details
- Born: May 1, 1944; Springfield, Massachusetts, U.S.
- Died: October 3, 2023 (aged 79); Southwick, Massachusetts, U.S.
- Education: Norwich University

Playing career

Basketball
- 1963–1967: Norwich

Coaching career (HC unless noted)

Football
- 1968–1979: Agawam HS (MA) (assistant)
- 1980–1982: Westfield State (DC)
- 1983–1985: Westfield State

Head coaching record
- Overall: 11–17

Howard Joseph Murphy Jr. (May 1, 1944 – October 3, 2023) was an American football coach. He served as the head football coach at Westfield State University in Westfield, Massachusetts for three seasons, from 1983 to 1985, compiling a record of 11–17.

Murphy died October 3, 2023, at the age of 79.

== Head coaching record ==
| Year | Team | Overall | Conference | Standing | Bowl/playoffs |
|---|---|---|---|---|---|
Westfield State Owls (New England Football Conference) (1983–1985)
| 1983 | Westfield State | 2–7 | 2–7 | 9th | |
| 1984 | Westfield State | 4–5 | 4–5 | 5th | |
| 1985 | Westfield State | 4–5 | 4–5 | T–6th | |
| Westfield State: | | 11–17 | 11–17 | | |
| Total: | | 11–17 | | | |
