= Ludlow, Massachusetts =

- Town
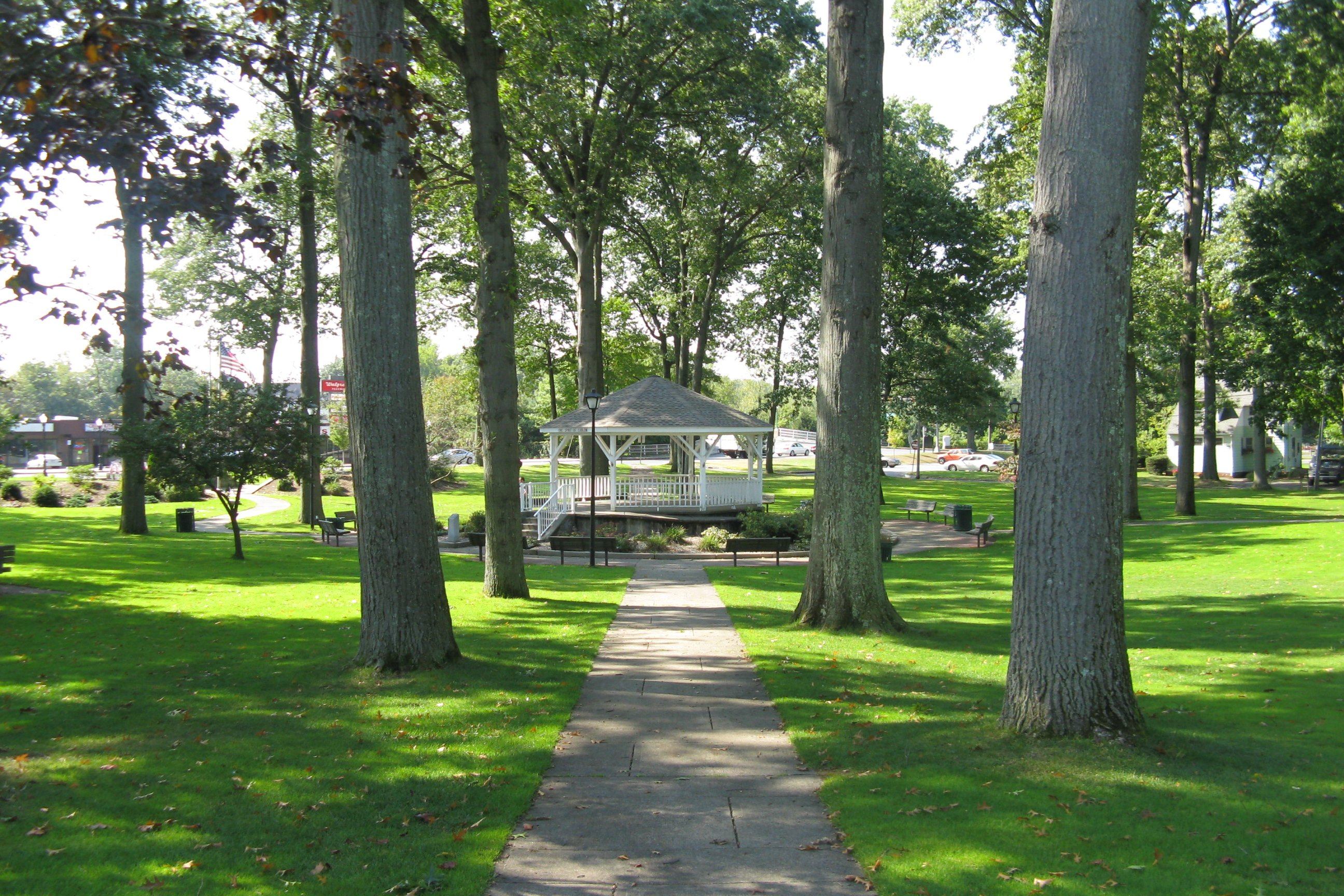
- Ludlow Town Green

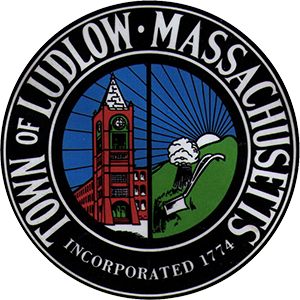
- Flag Seal
- Nicknames: Soccer City, The Bubble, Mini Portugal, Jute Town (archaic)
- Location in Hampden County in Massachusetts
- Coordinates: 42°9′36″N 72°28′35″W
- Country: United States
- State: Massachusetts
- County: Hampden
- Settled: 1751
- District: March 29, 1774
- Incorporation: August 23, 1775

Government
  - Type: Representative town meeting
  - Town Administrator: Marc Strange
  - Board of Selectmen: Members: Derek DeBarge; Manuel D. Silva; James T. Gennette; Antonio Goncalves; William Rosenblum

Area
  - Total: 28.2 sq mi (73.1 km^{2})
  - Land: 27.1 sq mi (70.3 km^{2})
  - Water: 1.1 sq mi (2.8 km^{2})
- Elevation: 551 ft (168 m)

Population (2020)
  - Total: 21,002
  - Density: 774/sq mi (298.7/km^{2})
- Time zone: UTC-5 (Eastern)
  - Summer (DST): UTC-4 (Eastern)
- ZIP Code: 01056
- Area code: 413
- FIPS code: 25-37175
- GNIS feature ID: 0618187
- Website: http://www.ludlow.ma.us/

Ludlow is a New England town in Hampden County, Massachusetts, United States. The population was 21,002 as of the 2020 census, and it is considered part of the Springfield Metropolitan Statistical Area. Located just northeast of Springfield across the Chicopee River, it is one of the city's suburbs. It has a sizable and visible Portuguese and Polish community.

== History ==
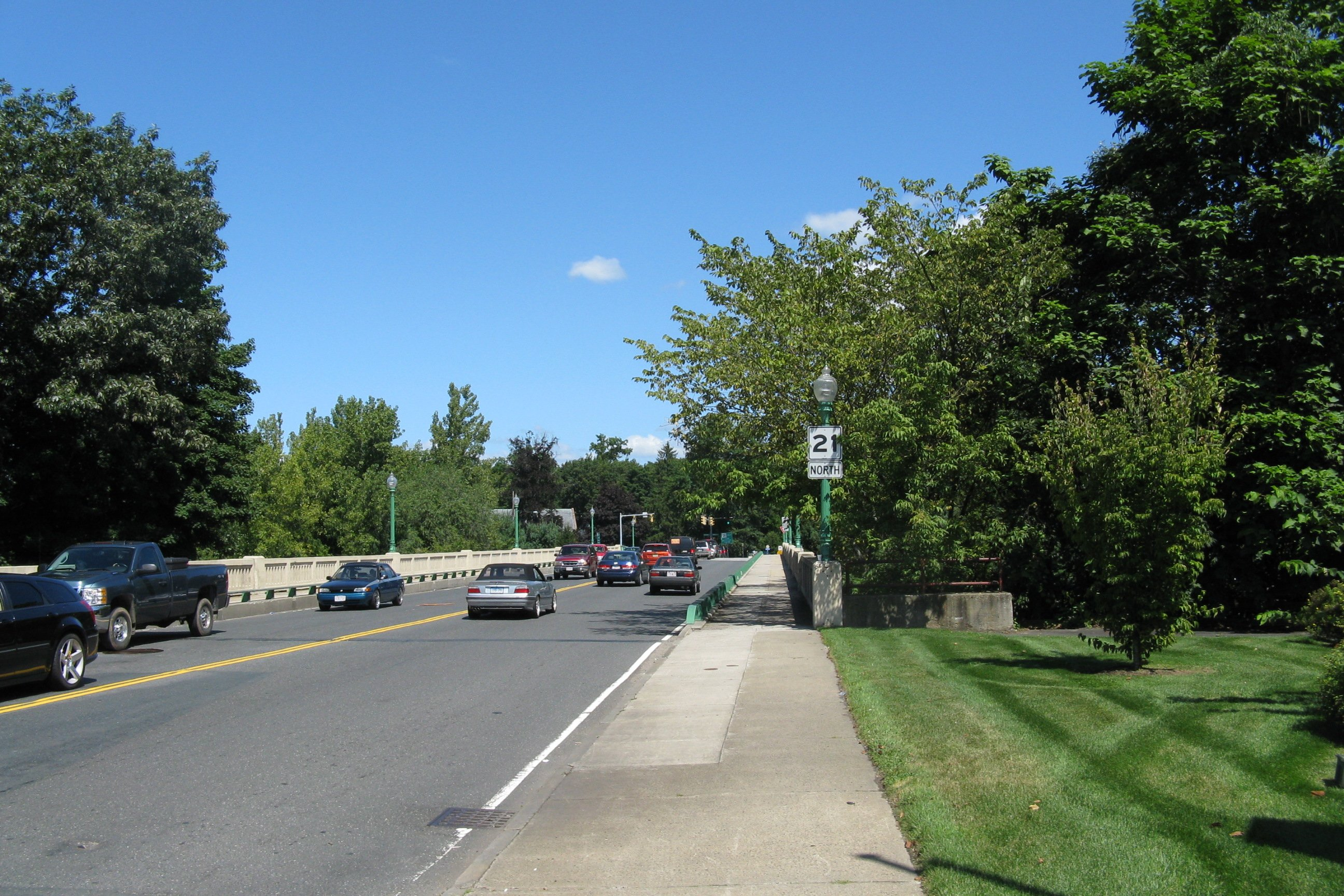
Put's Bridge looking towards Ludlow

The Indigenous people along the Chicopee River, including modern-day Ludlow, were Algonquian speaking peoples. Though records are incomplete, the first inhabitants were likely the Nipmuc or Pocomtuc tribes. During King Philip’s War (1675–1676), British settlers forced a band of Indigenous people, led by Roaring Thunder, to jump to the water of the Chicopee River to escape their attackers (this place has since been called Indian Leap).

Although plans were drawn up for settlement as early as 1685, within the original boundaries of Springfield, Massachusetts, the British first settled in Ludlow in 1751 as Stony Hill Parish. However, the town was later renamed Ludlow and incorporated as a separate entity in 1774, just before the breakout of the American Revolution. For much of its early history the town was agrarian and today many of Ludlow's street names are derived from the names of these farming families (e.g. Chapin Street, Miller Street, Alden Street, Fuller Street). Ludlow was home to many sawmills and gristmills, utilizing the power from several sources of water nearby, the Chicopee River, Broad Brook, Higher Brook, and Stony Brook. Before the Civil War, the town began to develop into a mill town. This included the manufacturing of glass bottles by the many glassware companies, including John Sikes. Then Governor of Massachusetts Bay Colony, Thomas Hutchinson renamed the town from the District of Stony Hill to Ludlow. The town of Ludlow was possibly named after Roger Ludlow, one of the founders of the Connecticut Colony or named after Ludlow, Shropshire, a town in England.

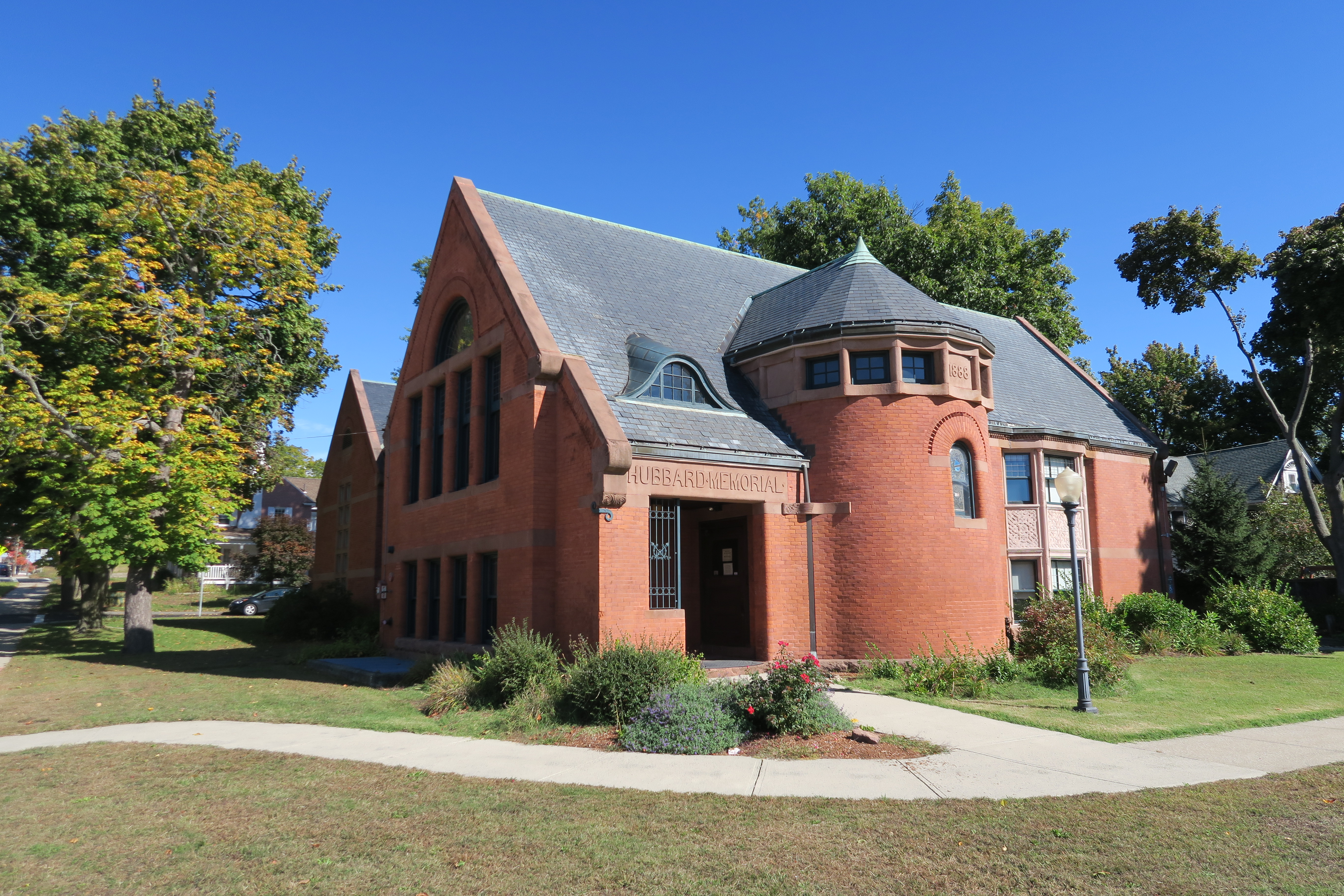
Hubbard Memorial Library

In 1868, the largest mill was opened and operated by the Ludlow Company (The Ludlow Clock Tower is depicted on the town seal), who produced jute yarns, twine, and webbing. This company helped shape the town by providing housing, a library, schools, playgrounds, and even a clubhouse for the increasingly diverse community. The mills led to a large influx of immigrants. First, Irish and French Canadians, who established a Little Canada that formed a triangle from what is now Center Street (near Hubbard Library) toward West Avenue and Stebbins Street to Saint John the Baptist Church. Later, Polish immigrants came in large numbers to also work in the Mills, inhabiting housing along East Street and over the bridge in Indian Orchard. In the 20th century, this company moved to India and is now known as Ludlow Jute and Specialties of Mumbai.

In the early 20th century Ludlow developed from a mill town into a streetcar suburb of Springfield, Massachusetts, with a trolley line running over the bridge from Indian Orchard. Ludlow also had two railroads that traversed the town: the Springfield, Athol and North-eastern Railroad and the Hamden Railroad. The Hamden Railroad was closed and Interstate 90 was constructed over its former tracks. The Springfield, Athol, and Northeastern Railroad was reduced in length in the late 1930s as a result of the creation of Quabbin Reservoir. The train station for this line was at the corner of Winsor Street and Sewall Street and was the last station from Boston when the railroad closed in the 1950s. The train station was demolished in 1960. In 1981, the Stony Brook Power Plant was constructed in the town providing 517 Megawatts of electricity to 24 municipalities. In 1983, the plant became the first combined-cycle power plant in Massachusetts.

Ludlow's population boomed in the 1950s with the creation of Interstate 90, known in Massachusetts as the Massachusetts Turnpike. John F. Thompson, who was speaker of the House of Representatives in the Massachusetts General Court at the time, was influential in gaining an exit on the Turnpike for Ludlow (now Exit 54, formerly 7) and subsequently the Turnpike influenced the growth of Ludlow as a suburb of Springfield. Since the 1950s, the development of numerous subdivisions has added to Ludlow's growth.

== Geography ==
According to the United States Census Bureau, the town has a total area of 28.2 square miles (73 km^{2}), of which 27.1 square miles (70 km^{2}) are land and 1.1 square miles (2.8 km^{2}) (3.83%) is water. Ludlow is bordered by Chicopee on the west, Granby on the north, Belchertown on the northeast, Palmer on the east, Wilbraham on the south, and Springfield on the southwest.

== Demographics ==
Historical population
Year	Pop.	±%
1790	560	—
1850	1,186	+111.8%
1860	1,174	−1.0%
1870	1,136	−3.2%
1880	1,526	+34.3%
1890	1,939	+27.1%
1900	3,536	+82.4%
1910	4,948	+39.9%
1920	7,470	+51.0%
1930	8,876	+18.8%
1940	8,181	−7.8%
1950	8,660	+5.9%
1960	13,805	+59.4%
1970	17,580	+27.3%
1980	18,150	+3.2%
1990	18,820	+3.7%
2000	21,209	+12.7%
2010	21,103	−0.5%
2020	21,002	−0.5%
2024*	21,118	+0.6%
* = population estimate. Source: United States census records and Population Estimates Program data.

As of the 2000 United States census, there were 21,209 people living in the town. The population density was 752.1 inhabitants per square mile (290.4/km^{2}). The racial makeup of the city was 95.78% White, 2.19% African American, 0.27% Native American, 0.68% Asian, 0.03% Pacific Islander, and 1.09% from other races. Hispanic or Latino people of any race were 6.47% of the population.

== Culture ==
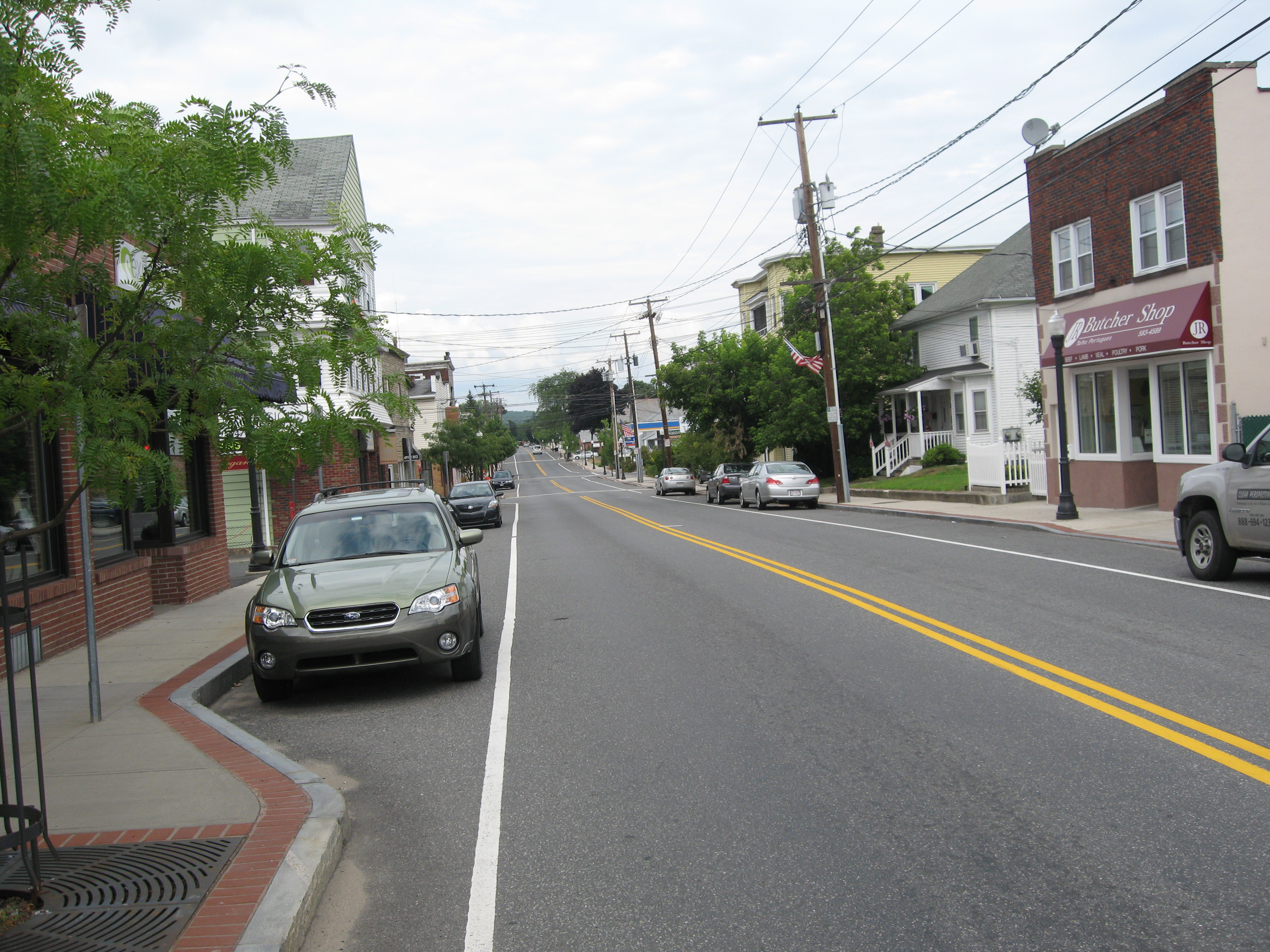
Downtown Ludlow

Portuguese-Americans make up 21% of the population of the town.

The Portuguese church Our Lady of Fatima puts on an annual Festa, which is one of the most significant cultural events for Portuguese-Americans in the country.

Ludlow is home to many people of Polish and French Canadian descent.

Soccer is an extremely popular sport in Ludlow. The town's high school soccer team is the most dominant in Western Massachusetts. It has been ranked in the top 20 high school programs nationally by the NSCAA and has won many state championships, most recently in 2018. The town is also home to the amateur Gremio Lusitano, and the Western Mass Pioneers and Western Mass Lady Pioneers professional soccer teams. The Pioneers play in the USL Second Division, while the Lady Pioneers compete in the USL W-League. Both teams play their home games at Lusitano Stadium in Ludlow. In 1996, the National Soccer Hall of Fame added Ludlow to its soccer history display.

== Government ==
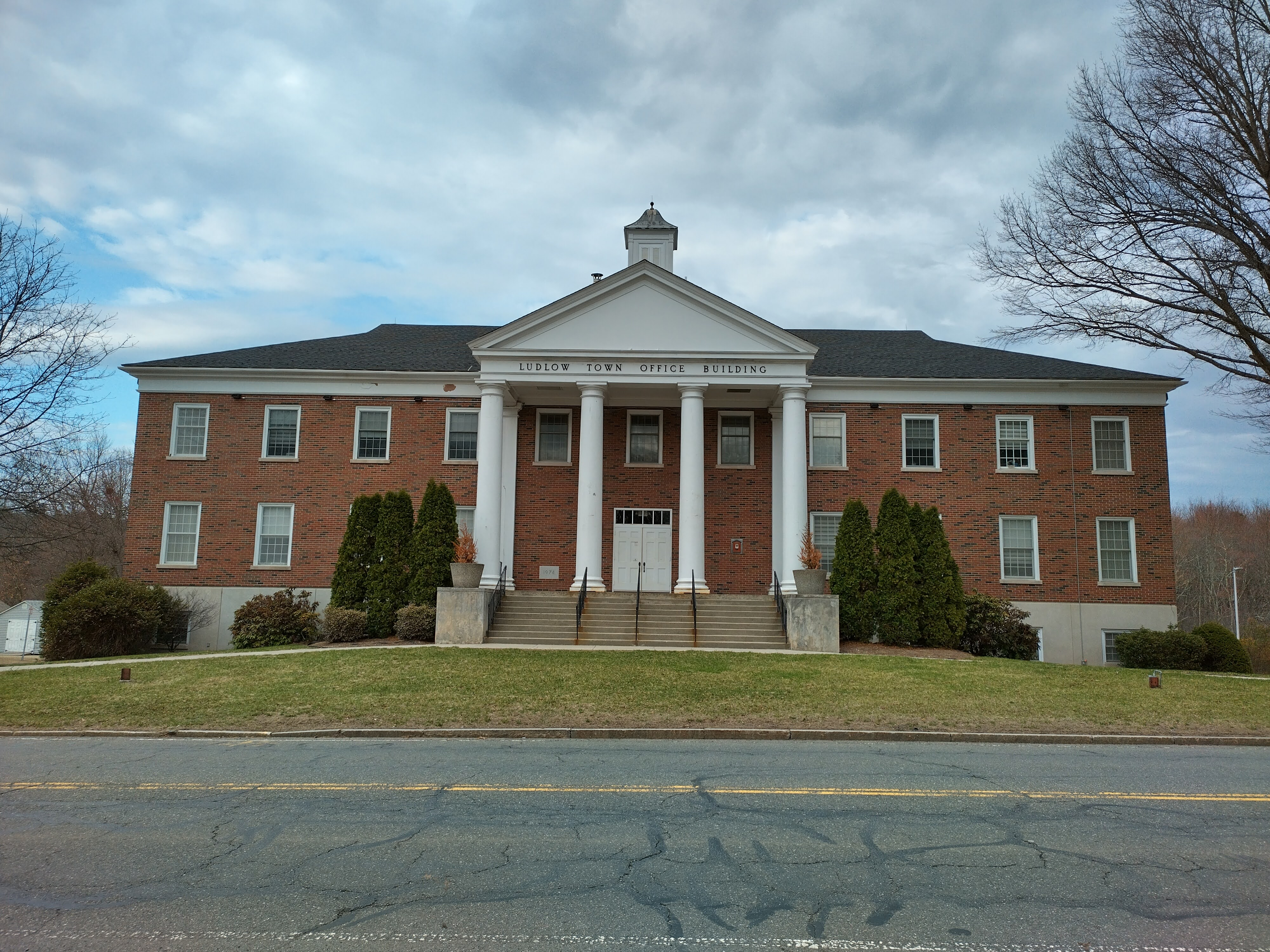
Ludlow Town Office Building

Ludlow is governed by a representative town meeting, its legislative body, and an executive body made up of a five-person board of selectmen and a town administrator. Fifteen town meeting representatives are elected to three-year terms from each of the town's six precincts. An additional twenty representatives at-large come from the board of selectmen, moderator, town clerk, treasurer, collector, counsel, highway surveyor, and the chair of any board or commission established in the town. From incorporation until 1930, the town was governed by an open town meeting and board of selectmen.

== Education ==
The town is served by two public elementary schools, East Street School and Harris Brook Elementary School. Previously, students attended elementary school based on their residence, but starting with the 2009–2010 school year a reorganization plan took effect in which preschool, Kindergarten and First Grade attend East Street, and grades 2–5 attend Harris Brook. There is one public middle school, Paul R. Baird Middle School. Ludlow High School is the town's only public high school.

The town also features St. John the Baptist, a private school serving grades K–8 affiliated with St. Elizabeth Parish. The nearest vocational high school is Pathfinder High School in Palmer.

The nearest community colleges are Springfield Technical Community College and Holyoke Community College. The nearest state universities are the University of Massachusetts Amherst and Westfield State University. The nearest private colleges from the center of Ludlow are Western New England University, American International College, and Springfield College, all in Springfield, as well as Our Lady of the Elms College in Chicopee.

== Transportation ==
Ludlow is located at exit 54 on I-90, known as the Massachusetts Turnpike. State Highway 21 connects Ludlow to Springfield and Belchertown, and there are local bus routes to Springfield.

Bradley International Airport is 23 miles away and Logan International Airport is 77 miles away in Boston. There are bus stops along Center St., Winsor St. and East St. that connect Ludlow to Springfield.

The town once had a train station and almost featured two railroads. The first railroad was the Springfield, Athol and North-eastern Railroad which connected between Boston and New York. There was a spur of the railroad going to Athol but was cut off by the formation of the Quabbin Reservoir in the late 1930s. Ludlow was the last stop until 1960 when the train station shut down. The train later shut down shortly thereafter. The second railroad was an unopened bypass for the Springfield and Albany Railroad called the Hampden Bypass. It was built in the 1910s but the funding collapsed and never opened. The at grade was later used as the Massachusetts Turnpike from the Chicopee border to the Minnechaog Mountain curve about where Miller and East streets are today and continued onto Palmer. Several of the concrete structures still remain in the less populated areas of Ludlow.

- Chester W. Chapin (1798–1883), businessman, Massachusetts state representative
- Nicole Fiorentino (born 1979), bass guitarist for the band Smashing Pumpkins
- Gabriel Gonzaga (born 1979), UFC fighter
- Dean Lombardi (born 1958), former general manager of the Los Angeles Kings and the San Jose Sharks of the NHL
- Tom Matera (born 1981), World Wrestling Entertainment star, known as Antonio Thomas
- William D. Mullins (1931–1986), member of the Massachusetts House of Representatives and baseball player
- Mike Mushok (born 1970), guitarist from the rock band Staind
- Fred Pereira (born 1954), professional soccer player
- Elisha K. Root (1808–1865), industrialist and inventor of the die-casting technique
- John F. Thompson (1920–1965), Massachusetts state representative who served as House speaker

== See also ==
- List of mill towns in Massachusetts
