= Abortion in Massachusetts =

Abortion in Massachusetts is legal throughout pregnancy; terminations after the 24th week are based on the professional judgment of the physician. Modern Massachusetts is considered to be one of the most supportive states for abortion rights in the country; a 2014 Pew Research poll found that 74% of residents supported the right to an abortion in all or most cases, a higher percentage than any other state in 2014. Marches supporting abortion rights took place as part of the #StoptheBans movement in May 2019. The 2023 American Values Atlas reported that, in their most recent survey, 78% of people from Massachusetts said that abortion should be legal in all or most cases.

In 2020, the legislature overrode Republican governor Charlie Baker's veto of the ROE Act, to codify existing abortion laws in the case of Roe vs. Wade being struck down by the U.S. Supreme Court. Individuals can seek abortion without parental consent at the age of 16, and seek an abortion at any point in pregnancy ever since the state repealed it's 24-week limit in 2026.

The number of abortion clinics in Massachusetts, like other U.S. states, has declined in recent years. In 2014, there were 19,354 legal abortions performed in the Commonwealth.

== History ==
Madame Restell opened a business that performed abortions in the 1830s in New York City. Her business remained open for around 35 years and openly advertised its services, including in newspaper advertisements. She had branches in several other cities including Boston and Philadelphia, as well as having traveling agents working for the company who sold her "Female Monthly Pills".

=== Legislative history ===
By the end of the 1800s, all states in the Union, except Louisiana, had therapeutic exceptions in their legislative bans on abortions. By the end of 1972, Mississippi allowed abortion in cases of rape or incest only, and Alabama and Massachusetts allowed abortions only in cases where the woman's physical health was endangered. In order to obtain abortions during this period, women would often travel from a state where abortion was illegal to states where it was legal. Massachusetts passed a law in the early 1980s requiring parental consent for minors seeking abortions. This resulted in minors delaying of up to 6 weeks before seeking an abortion. Parental consent laws passed by Massachusetts and Minnesota in the 1980s created over 12,000 petitions to bypass consent. Of these, 21 were denied, and half of these denials were overturned on appeal.

In 2007, the legislature passed a law that established a 35-foot buffer zone around abortion clinics. However, this law was struck down in 2014 in McCullen v. Coakley. As of 2017, Washington State, New Mexico, Illinois, Alaska, Maryland, Massachusetts, Connecticut, and New Jersey allow qualified non-physicians to prescribe drugs for medical abortions only. As of May 2019, state law prohibited abortions after the fetus was viable, generally some point between week 24 and 28. This period uses a standard defined by the US Supreme Court in 1973 with the Roe v. Wade ruling. The law stated: "No abortion may be performed, except by a physician, and only if it is necessary to save the life of the mother, or if a continuation of her pregnancy will impose on her a substantial risk of grave impairment of her physical or mental health." Roe's Bill was scheduled to be debated in the fall of 2019. In January 2019, Bill S.1209 was introduced in the state's Senate, where it was known as "Roe's Bill". The proposed bill would remove parental consent requirements for minors seeking abortions. It would also allow women to have abortions after week 24 if a woman's doctor said an abortion "is necessary to protect the patient's life or physical or mental health, or in cases of lethal fetal anomalies, or where the fetus is incompatible with sustained life outside the uterus". Prior to 2020, state law banned abortion after week 24. After the passage of the ROE Act in 2020, which codified abortion rights in the state, abortions can be performed after 24 weeks in cases of fetal anomalies and risks to a patient's mental or physical health. The ROE Act also lowered the age patients can have abortions without parental consent from 18 to 16.

In 2026, Governor Healy signed legislation eliminating previous restrictions on abortions after 24 weeks of pregnancy, leaving the decision up to the physician's professional judgment, making Massachusetts the 10th state to eliminate all gestational limits on abortion.

=== Judicial history ===
In the 1972 US Supreme Court case Eisenstadt v. Baird, the focus was on the issue of physicians' ability to prescribe contraceptive medications only to married couples. The US Supreme Court ruled that single individuals had a right to buy contraceptives, and the law could not be used to limit distribution based on marital status.

The US Supreme Court's decision in 1973's Roe v. Wade ruling meant the state could no longer regulate abortion in the first trimester. However, the Supreme Court overturned Roe v. Wade in Dobbs v. Jackson Women's Health Organization, No. 19-1392, 597 U.S. ___ (2022) later in 2022.

Bellotti v. Baird was before the US Supreme Court in 1979. The Court ruled that attempts by Massachusetts to limit the ability of minors to get abortions by requiring parental consent or judicial reviews were unconstitutional. This was because it removed the ability of minors to make decisions about their well-being, and giving the decision exclusively to their parents or the court; minors needed to be able to actively consent to the procedure and as such could make a request without first seeking parental approval. The US Supreme Court ruled that minors, in getting permission from the courts, needed to be able to do so using a confidential process that dealt with the situation quickly.

In 2014, in McCullen v. Coakley, the US Supreme Court struck down a Massachusetts law that had legalized a 35-foot buffer zone around abortion clinics in the state in 2007.

=== Clinic history ===
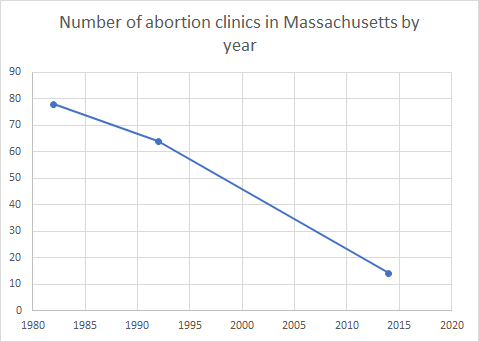
Number of abortion clinics in Massachusetts by year

Between 1982 and 1992, the number of abortion clinics in the state decreased by 14, going from 78 in 1982 to 64 in 1992. In 2014, there were 14 abortion clinics in the state. In 2014, 43% of the counties in the state did not have an abortion clinic. That year, 14% of women in the state aged 15–44 lived in a county without an abortion clinic. In 2017, there were five Planned Parenthood clinics, three of which offered abortion services, in a state with a population of 1,614,490 women aged 15–49.

== Statistics ==
In the period between 1972 and 1974, the state had an illegal abortion mortality rate per million women aged 15–44 of between 0.1 and 0.9. In 1990, 864,000 women in the state faced the risk of an unintended pregnancy. In 2001, Arizona, Florida, Iowa, Louisiana, Massachusetts, and Wisconsin did not provide any residence related data regarding abortions performed in the state to the Centers for Disease Control. In 2014, 74% of adults said in a poll by the Pew Research Center that abortion should be legal in all or most cases. In 2017, the state had an infant mortality rate of 3.7 deaths per 1,000 live births.

Number of reported abortions, abortion rate and percentage change in rate by geographic region and state in 1992, 1995 and 1996
| Census division and state | Number | | | Rate | | | % change 1992–1996 |
|---|---|---|---|---|---|---|---|
| Census division and state | 1992 | 1995 | 1996 | 1992 | 1995 | 1996 | % change 1992–1996 |
| Total | 1,528,930 | 1,363,690 | 1,365,730 | 25.9 | 22.9 | 22.9 | –12 |
| New England | 78,360 | 71,940 | 71,280 | 25.2 | 23.6 | 23.5 | –7 |
| Connecticut | 19,720 | 16,680 | 16,230 | 26.2 | 23 | 22.5 | –14 |
| Maine | 4,200 | 2,690 | 2,700 | 14.7 | 9.6 | 9.7 | –34 |
| Massachusetts | 40,660 | 41,190 | 41,160 | 28.4 | 29.2 | 29.3 | 3 |
| New Hampshire | 3,890 | 3,240 | 3,470 | 14.6 | 12 | 12.7 | –13 |
| Rhode Island | 6,990 | 5,720 | 5,420 | 30 | 25.5 | 24.4 | –19 |

Number, rate, and ratio of reported abortions, by reporting area of residence and occurrence and by percentage of abortions obtained by out-of-state residents, US CDC estimates
| Location | Residence | | | Occurrence | | | % obtained by out-of-state residents | Year | Ref |
|---|---|---|---|---|---|---|---|---|---|
| Location | No. | Rate^ | Ratio^^ | No. | Rate^ | Ratio^^ | % obtained by out-of-state residents | Year | Ref |
| Massachusetts | | | | 40,660 | 28.4 | | | 1992 | |
| Massachusetts | | | | 41,190 | 29.2 | | | 1995 | |
| Massachusetts | | | | 41,160 | 29.3 | | | 1996 | |
| Massachusetts | 18,630 | 13.6 | 259 | 19,354 | 14.1 | 269 | 3.7 | 2014 | |
| Massachusetts | 17,294 | 12.6 | 242 | 17,901 | 13.0 | 251 | 3.6 | 2016 | |
^number of abortions per 1,000 women aged 15–44; ^^number of abortions per 1,000 live births

== Abortion financing ==
Seventeen states including Massachusetts use their own funds to cover all or most "medically necessary" abortions sought by low-income women under Medicaid, thirteen of which are required by State court orders to do so. In 2010, the state had 4,100 publicly funded abortions, of which none were federally funded and all were state funded.

== Intersections with religion and religious figures ==
In 2004, then-Archbishop Raymond Leo Burke said he would not give communion to 2004 presidential candidate and Massachusetts senator John Kerry, in part because of his position on abortion. Kerry's own Archbishop Sean O'Malley refused to specify the applicability of his earlier statement that such Catholics are in a state of grave sin and cannot properly receive communion. According to Margaret Ross Sammons, Kerry's campaign was sufficiently damaged by the threat to withhold communion that it may have cost him the election.

== Abortion rights views and activities ==
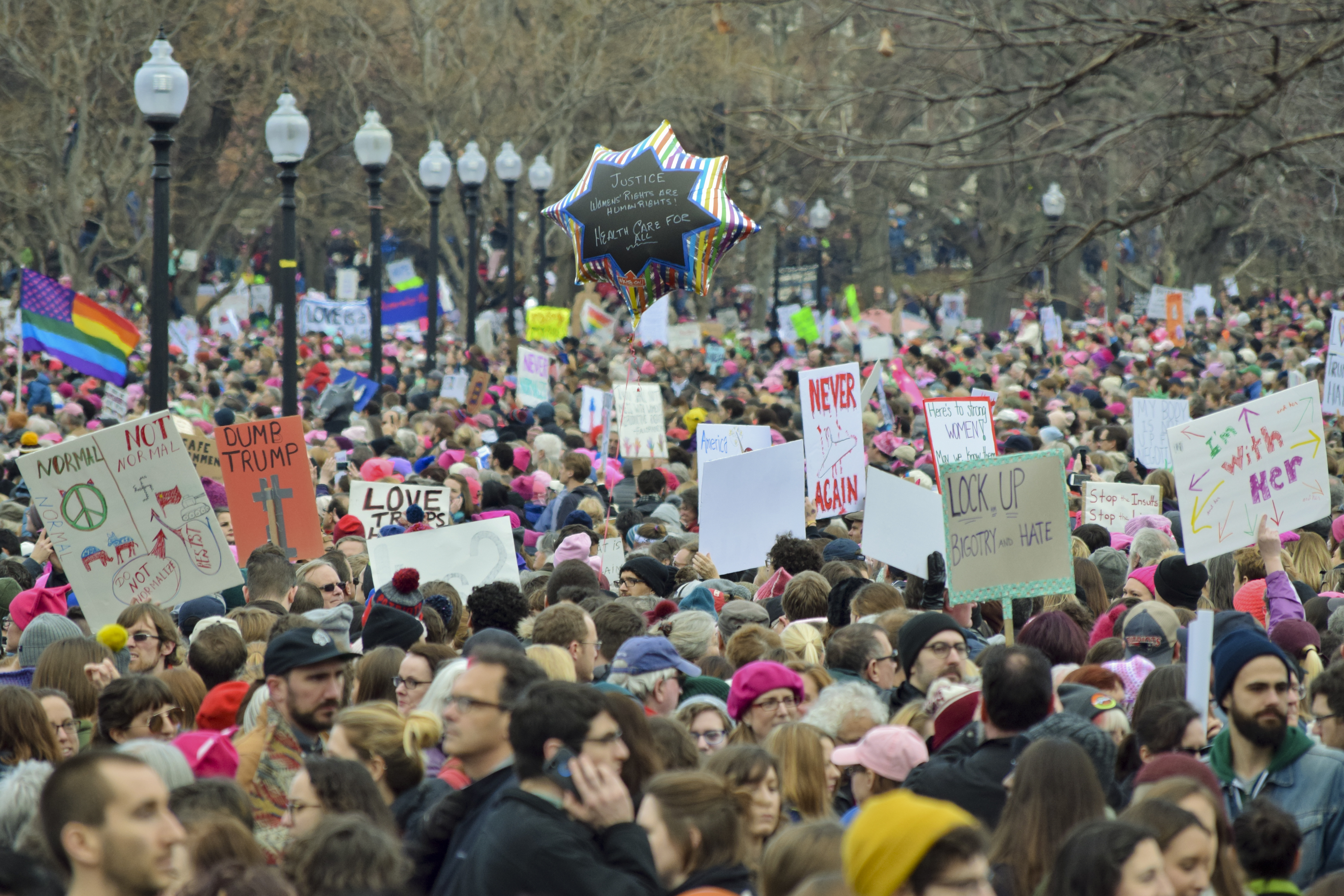
2017 Boston Women's March

A PEW research poll finding that 74% of residents supported the right to an abortion in all or most cases, the highest percentage of any state in the country.

=== Protests ===
Women from the state participated in marches supporting abortion rights as part of a #StoptheBans movement in May 2019.

Following the overturn of Roe v. Wade on June 24, 2022, WBUR counted over 1,000 abortion rights protestors marching in Boston near the Boston Public Library. Over 100 abortion rights protesters gathered outside Worcester City Hall. On October 15, 2022 in Boston, an abortion rights "Clown March" protest was held to counterprotest an anti-abortion "Men's March". This protest was repeated the following year on November 4. On November 16, 2024, 9 people were arrested in Boston during the annual protest.

== Anti-abortion views and activities ==
=== Activities ===
During the early 20th century, Boston University and Harvard University led the early anti-abortion campaigns in their areas. Harvard Medical School graduate Dr. Horatio Storer led anti-abortion efforts at the American Medical Association starting in the late 19th century until his death in 1922.

=== Violence ===
On December 30, 1994, two receptionists, Shannon Lowney and Lee Ann Nichols, were killed in two clinic attacks in Brookline, Massachusetts. John Salvi was arrested for the murders, to which he then confessed. He also confessed to a non-lethal attack in Norfolk, Virginia, where he was arrested the day after the Brookline killings. Salvi later died in prison of suspected suicide in November 1996. Guards found his body under his bed with a plastic garbage bag tied around his head.
