= Stony Brook (Fishing Creek tributary) =

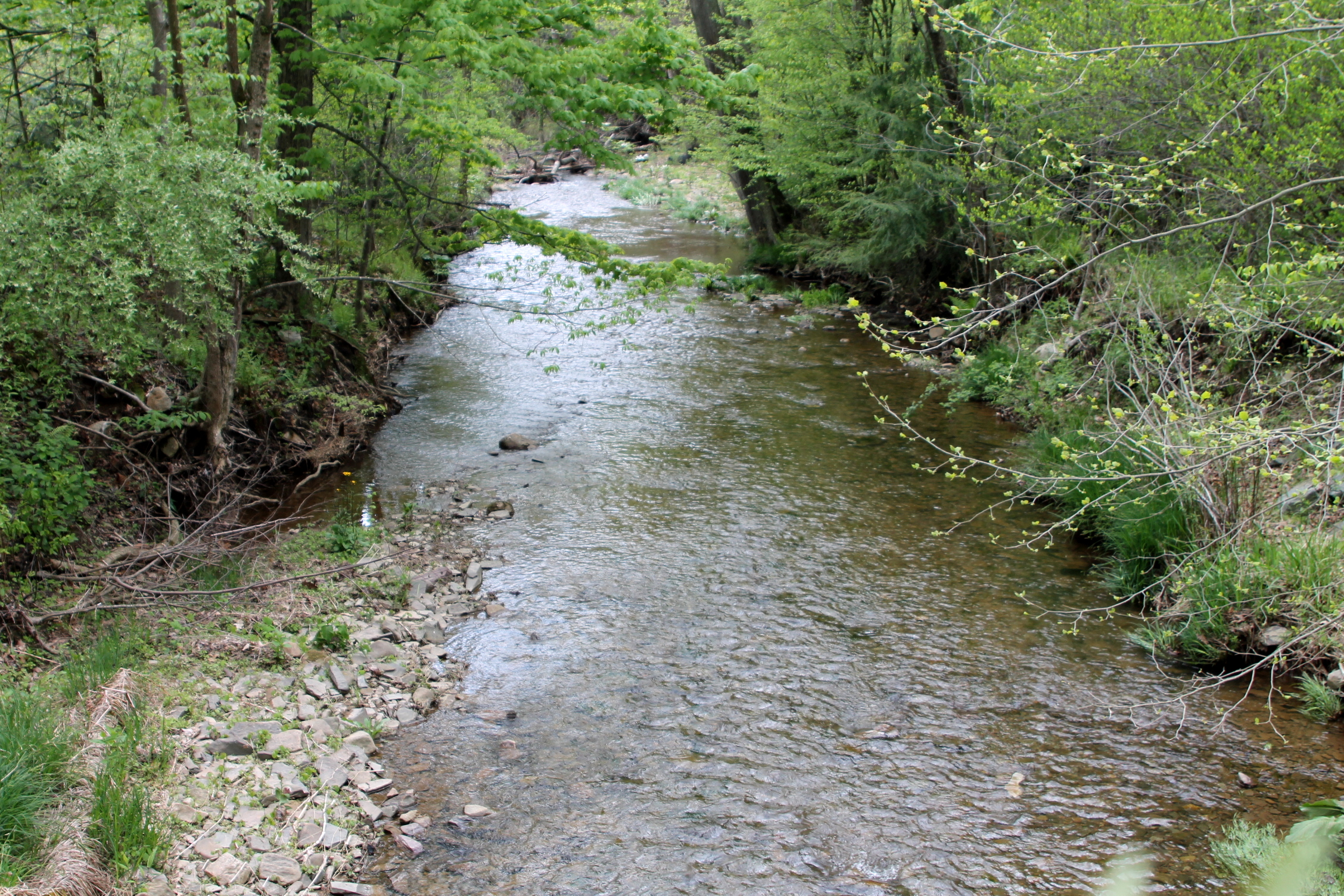
- The lower reaches of Stony Brook

Physical characteristics
- Source
  - location: North Centre Township, Pennsylvania
- Mouth
  - location: Fishing Creek in Orange Township, Pennsylvania
  - coordinates: 41°02′52″N 76°25′44″W
  - elevation: 528 ft (161 m)
- Length: 4.3 mi (6.9 km)
- Basin size: 3.72 sq mi (9.6 km^{2})

Stony Brook is a tributary of Fishing Creek in Columbia County, Pennsylvania. It is 4.3 miles (6.9 km) long and flows through North Centre Township and Orange Township. The stream's watershed has an area of 3.72 square miles. It flows through a steep ravine which is inhabited by numerous plant species for much of its length. The fossil-rich Stony Brook Beds also have an outcropping near the stream. In the 1870s, it was considered for use as a water supply by the Bloomsburg Water Company.

== Course ==
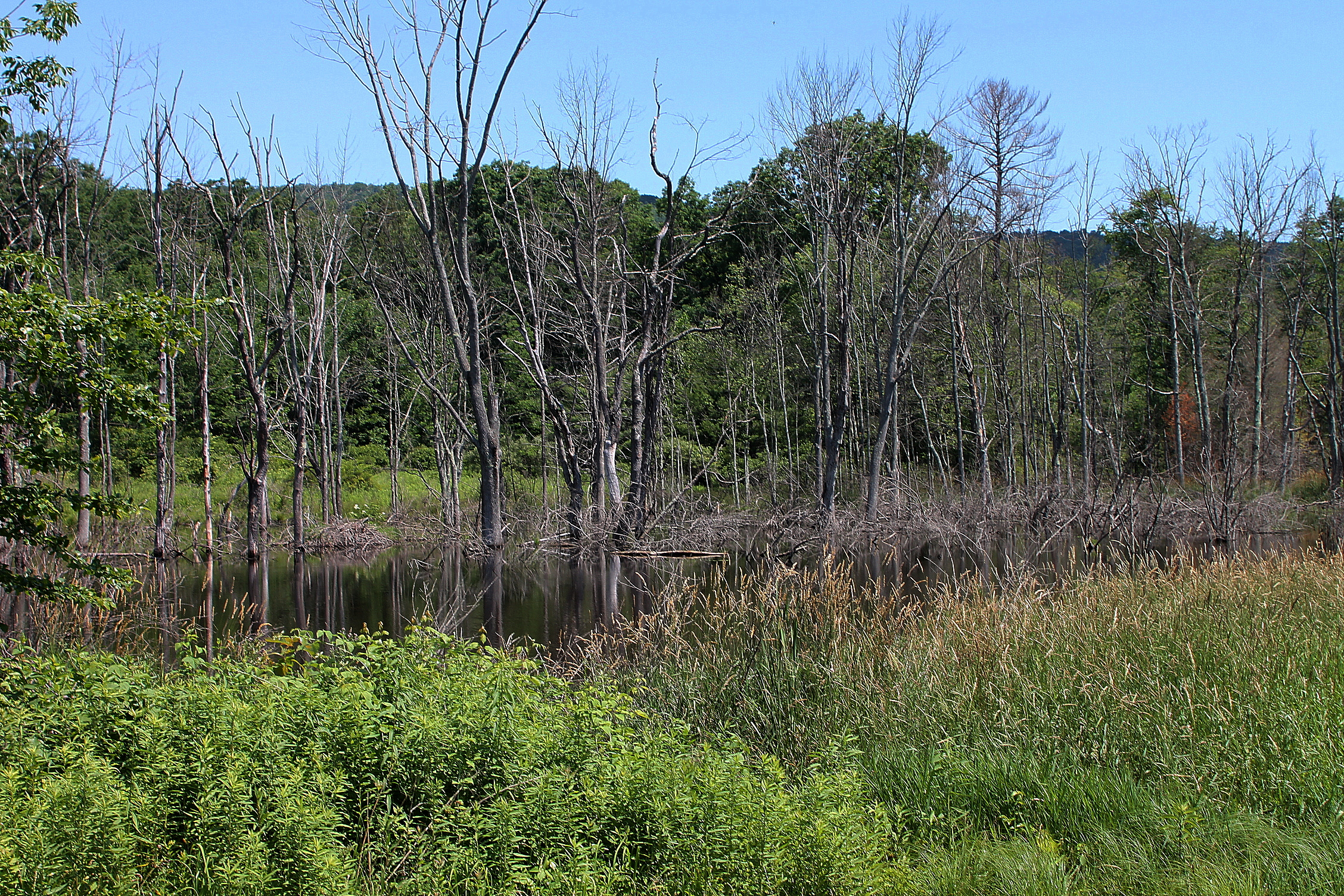
Stony Brook near its headwaters

Stony Brook starts in northwestern North Centre Township, on the southern edge of Knob Mountain. It begins flowing southwest and almost immediately crosses Pennsylvania Route 93. Shortly afterwards, it leaves North Centre Township, after which it enters Orange Township and continues southwest, where it enters a valley. The valley gets steeper as the stream turns south and then west, flowing north of Summer Hill. The stream crosses Pennsylvania Route 487 and shortly reaches its confluence with Fishing Creek.

Stony Brook joins Fishing Creek 8.1 miles (13.0 km) upstream of its mouth and 1 mile (1.6 km) upstream of Lightstreet.

== Geography, geology, and hydrology ==
Stony Brook flows through a steep and narrow valley for part of its length. The elevation of the stream is 528 feet (161 m) above sea level. The bed of Stony Brook consists of cobbles.

An outcropping of the rock formation known as the Stony Brook Beds is visible on the side of a road at the mouth of Stony Brook. This rock formation consists of shale and has a high concentration of fossils, including two varieties of spirifier.

The habitat around Stony Brook allows for a relatively high water quality; the stream's water is quite clear, but there is a risk the water quality could be impacted by runoff from nearby residential and agricultural lands.

== Watershed and tributaries ==
The Columbia County Natural Heritage Inventory from 2004 designated the watershed of Stony Brook as a "locally significant site". It has an area of 3.72 square miles, and no tributaries. The stream is in the Bloomsburg USGS Topographical Quadrant.

The valley of Stony Brook is forested and largely undeveloped. Although there is agricultural land upstream of the valley and on both sides of it and a housing development located on one side of the valley, there is no road going through the valley, and the Columbia County Natural Heritage Inventory strongly discourages the construction of one, stating that it would "be the most destructive action against this Exceptional Value Waters stream.".

== History ==
In the 1870s, the Bloomsburg Water Company attempted unsuccessfully to use Stony Brook as a water supply. In 1938, a concrete tee beam bridge was built over Stony Brook. It is 33.1 feet (10.1 m) long and carries Pennsylvania Route 487. The average traffic over the bridge is 6310 vehicles per day, as of 2013.

In 2009, 25 local volunteers cleaned up of 17.15 tons of debris that had been left at the confluence of Stony Brook with Fishing Creek during a flood in June 2006.

Stony Brook is named for the fact that rocks are found in large numbers near it.

== Biology ==
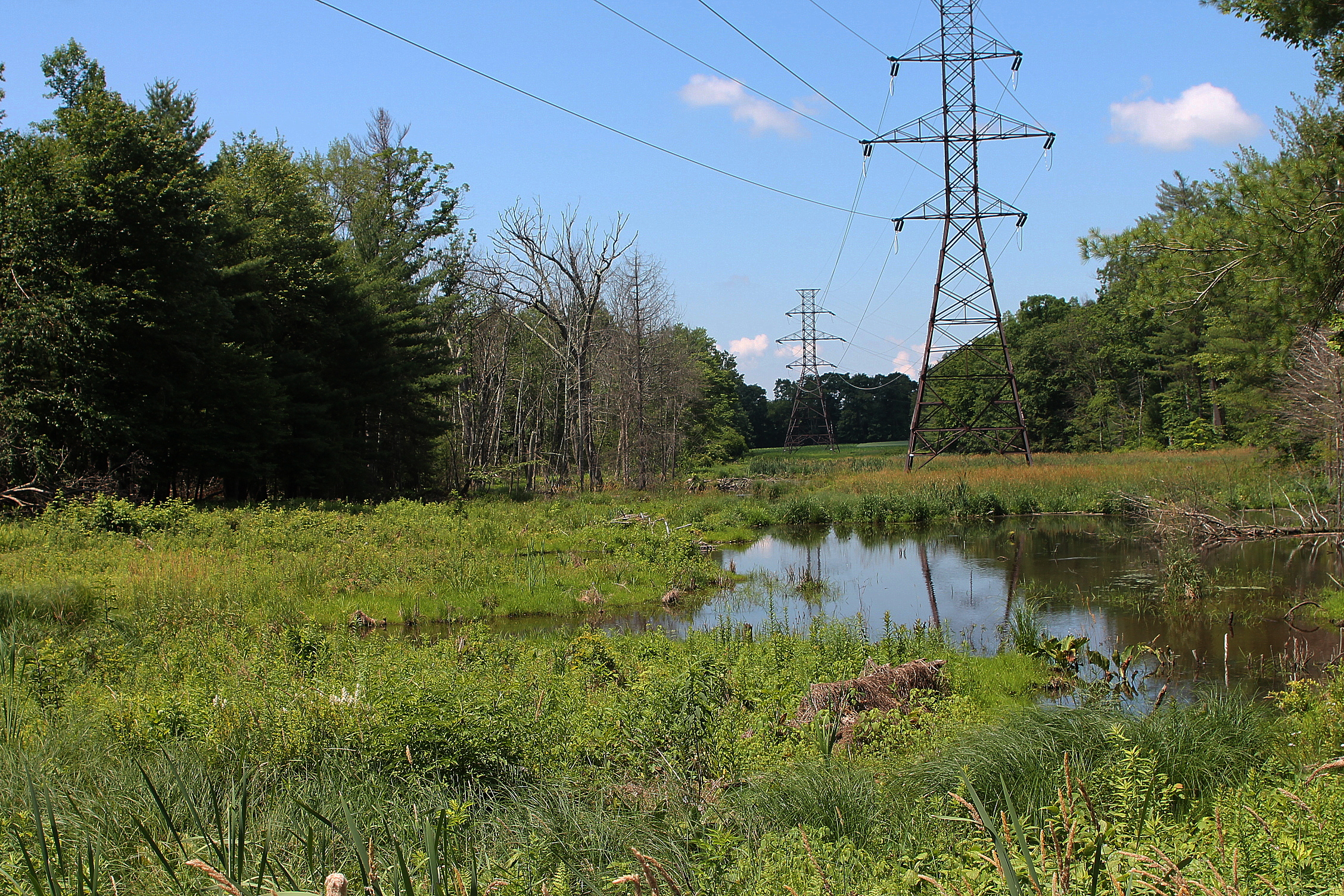
Power line crossing Stony Brook near its headwaters

The Pennsylvania Department of Environmental Protection has designated the entire length of Stony Brook as an Exceptional Value Stream, giving it some legal protection.

The trees in the valley of Stony Brook are mostly hemlock of various ages. Other trees inhabiting the valley include beech, basswood, two varieties of oak, yellow birch, black cherry, pignut hickory, tulip poplar, white ash, and sugar maple. There is also a substantial population of herbaceous plants in the bottom of the valley, particularly ferns: nine species have been recorded.

Native woodland flowers inhabit the edges of Stony Brook. These include blue cohosh, false hellebore, twisted stalk, miterwort, golden saxifrage, barren strawberry, false Solomon's seal, Solomon's seal, Canada violet, purple trillium, wild stonecrop, trout lily, dwarf ginseng, and white baneberry.

An overhead power line crosses the valley of Stony Brook in one location. The area in its vicinity is inhabited by high numbers of invasive plants, such as multiflora rose. There are small numbers of the hemlock woolly adelgid, which is considered a pest, in the watershed. In higher numbers, this insect could damage the watershed's hemlock forests.

== See also ==
- Deerlick Run
- List of tributaries of Fishing Creek (North Branch Susquehanna River)
