= Westfield State University =

Public university in Westfield, Massachusetts, US

- Former name: List: Barre Normal School (1839–1844); Westfield Normal School (1844–1932); Westfield State Teachers College (1932–1960); Massachusetts State College at Westfield (1960–1967); Westfield State College (1967–2010)
- Type: Public university
- Established: September 4, 1839; 186 years ago
- Accreditation: NECHE
- Affiliations: Cooperating Colleges of Greater Springfield
- Endowment: $20 million (2020)
- President: Linda Thompson
- Students: 4,555 (fall 2023)
- Undergraduates: 3,788 (fall 2023)
- Postgraduates: 767 (fall 2023)
- Location: Westfield, Massachusetts, United States; 42.131392°N 72.796005°W
- Campus: 256 acres (104 ha); Residential
- Colors: Blue, White and Gold
- Nickname: Owls
- Mascot: Nestor
- Website: westfield.ma.edu

Westfield State University (commonly known as Westfield State) is a public university in Westfield, Massachusetts, United States. It was founded in 1839 by Horace Mann as the first public coeducational college in America.

== History ==
In 1839, Horace Mann founded a state normal school in Barre, Massachusetts. It offered entry regardless of race, gender, or economic class. Samuel P. Newman, a professor and administrator at Bowdoin College, was the school's first principal. It was the second normal school in Massachusetts after the Lexington Normal School, which was founded earlier in the year. The Barre Normal School was suspended following Newman's death and moved to Westfield in 1844, where it became the Westfield Normal School. Rev. Emerson Davis, head of the Westfield Academy was placed in charge of the new school. The Westfield Normal School was later known as Westfield State Teachers College. In 1960, Governor Foster Furcolo signed a bill that would transition the state's nine teachers colleges, including Westfield State, into general state colleges and Westfield State Teachers College became Westfield State College the following year. The institution adopted its current name in 2010 as part of a statewide change.

== Rankings ==
Academic rankings

Regional
- U.S. News & World Report: 94

Undergraduate demographics as of Fall 2023
Race and ethnicity	Total
White	70%
Hispanic	14%
Black	7%
Two or more races	3%
Unknown	3%
Asian	2%
International student	1%
Economic diversity
Low-income (Note: The percentage of students who received an income-based federal Pell grant intended for low-income students.)	35%
Affluent (Note: The percentage of students who are a part of the American middle class at the bare minimum.)	65%

In 2013, WSU was ranked fourth nationally by US News in their Best Online Programs Honor Roll. WSU was also ranked first in the country for "Faculty Credentials & Training" and eleventh in "Student Services & Technology".

== Athletics ==
Westfield State athletics teams are nicknamed the Owls. The university competes in the Massachusetts State Collegiate Athletic Conference of NCAA Division III.

=== Varsity teams ===
Men's sports	Women's sports
Baseball	Basketball
Basketball	Cross country
Cross country	Field hockey
Football	Golf
Golf	Lacrosse
Ice hockey	Soccer
Soccer	Softball
Track and field	Swimming
	Track and field
	Volleyball

== Notable alumni ==
- George B. Cortelyou (1882): U.S. Secretary of the Treasury
- Nettie Stevens (1883): discoverer of the X and Y chromosomes
- Eduardo C. Robreno (1967): federal court judge
- Marsha Bemko (1977): television producer
- Peter Laviolette (1986): ice hockey player and coach
- Christopher Donelan (1987): Sheriff of Franklin County
- Domenic Sarno (1993): Mayor of Springfield
- Chris Caputo (2002): basketball coach
- Todd M. Smola (2004): representative from Palmer
- John J. O'Connor: artist
- Garreth Lynch: politician
- Alice Mary Dowd: educator, author
- Geraldo Alicea: representative in the Massachusetts House of Representatives
- William D. Mullins: member of the Massachusetts House of Representatives and baseball player
