= Jim Dew =

American football and baseball player and coach

Biographical details
- Born: c. 1944 (age 81–82); Baltimore, Maryland, U.S.

Playing career

Football
- 1963–1966: Mayville State
- 1967–1969: Racine Raiders

Baseball
- c. 1965: Mayville State
- Positions: Quarterback (football); Catcher (baseball)

Coaching career (HC unless noted)

Football
- 1970: Bemidji State (assistant)
- 1971–1973: Wisconsin–La Crosse (off. backfield)
- 1974–1993: Valley City State

Baseball
- 1971: Bemidji State (assistant)
- 1972–1973: Wisconsin–La Crosse (pitching)
- 1974–1991: Valley City State

Head coaching record
- Overall: 115–66–2 (football); 275–323 (baseball)
- Tournaments: Football; 1–3 (NAIA D-II playoffs)

Accomplishments and honors

Championships
- Football; 8 NDCAC (1976–1978, 1980, 1982–1984, 1988) Baseball 5 NDCAC (1978, 1981–1982, 1985, 1987)

Jim Dew (born c. 1944) is an American former football and baseball player and coach. He served as the head football coach at Valley City State University in Valley City, North Dakota from 1974 to 1993. Dew was also the head baseball coach at Valley City State from 1974 to 1991, tallying a mark of 275–323.

Dew attended Mount Saint Joseph High School in Baltimore. He played four years of football as a quarterback at Mayville State University in Mayville, North Dakota, and also lettered in baseball. He was drafted in 1966 as a catcher by the San Francisco Giants, but did not sign with the team. After graduating from Mayville State in 1967, Dew played for three seasons with the Racine Raiders of the Central State Football League. During that time, he was also a teacher at Gifford Junior High School in Racine, Wisconsin.

Dew was hired in 1970 as an assistant coach in football and baseball at Bemidji State College—now known as Bemidji State University—in Bemidji, Minnesota. He then coached at the University of Wisconsin–La Crosse as offensive backfield coach in football and pitching coach in baseball before he was hired as the head football coach at Valley City State in 1974.

Dew compiled a record of 115–66–2 in 20 seasons as head football coach at Valley City State. His football teams won eight North Dakota College Athletic Conference (NDCAC) titles—in 1976, 1977, 1978, 1980, 1982, 1983, 1984 and 1988, and qualified for the NAIA Division II Football National Championship playoff three times, in 1976, 1980, and 1988. Drew was dismissed from his post as head football coach in 1994 and reassigned as coordinator of special activities at the Valley City State campus.

== Head coaching record ==
=== Football ===
Year	Team	Overall	Conference	Standing	Bowl/playoffs	NAIA^{#}
Valley City State Vikings (North Dakota College Athletic Conference) (1974–1993)
1974	Valley City State	5–4	3–2	3rd		
1975	Valley City State	7–2	3–2	T–3rd		
1976	Valley City State	8–2	6–0	1st	L NAIA Division II Semifinal	5
1977	Valley City State	9–0	6–0	1st		5
1978	Valley City State	8–0–1	6–0	1st		10
1979	Valley City State	6–3	4–2	T–2nd		
1980	Valley City State	10–1	6–0	1st	L NAIA Division II Semifinal	6
1981	Valley City State	5–4	4–2	3rd		
1982	Valley City State	6–2	5–1	T–1st		
1983	Valley City State	6–3	5–1	T–1st		
1984	Valley City State	5–4	5–1	T–1st		
1985	Valley City State	5–4	3–2	3rd		
1986	Valley City State	6–3	4–1	2nd		
1987	Valley City State	6–3	4–1	2nd		19
1988	Valley City State	7–3	6–0	1st	L NAIA Division II First Round	17
1989	Valley City State	6–3	4–1	2nd		
1990	Valley City State	6–3	3–2	3rd		
1991	Valley City State	2–7	1–4	T–5th		
1992	Valley City State	2–7	1–4	T–5th		
1993	Valley City State	0–8–1	0–5	6th		
Valley City State:		115–66–2	79–31			
Total:		115–66–2				
National championship Conference title Conference division title or championship game berth
^{#}Rankings from NAIA Division II poll.
