= Bill Dudek =

American football player and coach (born 1943)

Current position
- Title: Football operations assistant
- Team: Graceland
- Conference: HAAC

Biographical details
- Born: June 18, 1943 (age 83); Belle Plaine, Iowa, U.S.
- Education: Graceland (1961)

Playing career
- 1957–1960: Graceland

Coaching career (HC unless noted)
- 1974–1992: Graceland
- 2015–present: Graceland (operations assistant)

Head coaching record
- Overall: 100–77–5
- Bowls: 0–1

Accomplishments and honors

Championships
- 1 HAAC (1975)

Awards
- Graceland University Hall of Fame (1987)

William Edward Dudek is a retired American football coach. He served as the head coach at Graceland University in Lamoni, Iowa from 1974 to 1992.

== Head coaching record ==
Year	Team	Overall	Conference	Standing	Bowl/playoffs
Graceland Yellowjackets (Heart of America Athletic Conference) (1974–1992)
1974	Graceland	2–7	2–4	T–4th	
1975	Graceland	7–3–1	5–1	T–1st	L Mineral Water
1976	Graceland	6–3	4–2	2nd	
1977	Graceland	8–2	4–2	T–2nd	
1978	Graceland	3–6	1–5	6th	
1979	Graceland	6–4	3–3	T–4th	
1980	Graceland	6–3	5–3	T–3rd	
1981	Graceland	7–3	5–3	4th	
1982	Graceland	7–2	5–2	T–2nd	
1983	Graceland	7–3	4–3	4th	
1984	Graceland	5–3–1	5–2	T–2nd	
1985	Graceland	5–4–1	2–4–1	T–5th	
1986	Graceland	4–6	2–5	T–6th	
1987	Graceland	2–6–1	1–4–1	6th	
1988	Graceland	6–4	3–4	T–5th	
1989	Graceland	4–4–1	2–4–1	6th	
1990	Graceland	6–4	4–3	4th	
1991	Graceland	5–4	2–4	T–5th	
1992	Graceland	3–7	2–6	T–6th	
Graceland:		99–78–5	61–64–3		
Total:		99–78–5			
National championship Conference title Conference division title or championship game berth
