= 1982 Valley City State Vikings football team =

American college football season

1982 Valley City State Vikings football
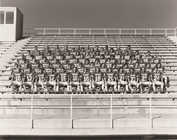

NDCAC co-champion
- Conference: North Dakota College Athletic Conference
- Record: 6–2 (5–1 NDCAC)
- Head coach: Jim Dew (9th season)
- Home stadium: Lokken Stadium

1982 North Dakota College Athletic Conference football standings
	Conf.					Overall
Team	W		L		T	W		L		T
No. 11 Dickinson State +	5	–	1	–	0	8	–	1	–	0
Valley City State +	5	–	1	–	0	6	–	2	–	0
Jamestown	4	–	2	–	0	6	–	3	–	0
Mayville State	3	–	3	–	0	6	–	3	–	0
Minot State	3	–	3	–	0	4	–	4	–	0
North Dakota Science	1	–	5	–	0	3	–	5	–	1
Bismarck JC	0	–	6	–	0	3	–	6	–	0
+ – Conference co-champions; Rankings from NAIA Division II poll

The 1982 Valley City State Vikings football team represented Valley City State University as a member of the North Dakota College Athletic Conference (NDCAC) during the 1982 NAIA Division II football season. Led by head coach Jim Dew, the Vikings finished 6–2 overall and 5–1 in NDCAC play, earning a share of the conference championship.

Valley City State opened the season with a statement victory over Northern State and followed with a dramatic 7–6 win over rival Jamestown, retaining the Paint Bucket Trophy. A road loss to Dickinson State put the Vikings at 2–1, but they responded with four straight conference wins — allowing no more than six points in any of those games.

The Vikings shared the NDCAC championship with Dickinson State and finished 6–2 overall. Linebacker Terry Babler was named Team MVP. Paul Leier, Jim Thies and Steve Guenther earned All-Conference honors, and both Theis and Guenther received NAIA Honorable Mention All-American recognition. Jeff Pederson was named Academic All-American.

== Schedule ==
Date	Opponent	Site	Result
September 11	Northern State*	Valley City, ND	W 20–10
September 18	at Jamestown	Jamestown, ND (rivalry)	W 7–6
September 25	Dickinson State	Valley City, ND (rivalry)	L 0–22
October 2	at Bismarck JC	Bismarck, ND	W 29–6
October 9	Mayville State	Valley City, ND (rivalry)	W 7–0
October 16	at North Dakota Science	Wahpeton, ND	W 33–3
October 23	Minot State	Valley City, ND	W 19–6
October 30	at Wisconsin–Stout*	Menomonie, WI	L 7–21
*Non-conference game

== Personnel ==
=== Coaching staff ===
- Jim Dew: head coach

=== Roster ===
Paul Kidel, Dan Gunderson, Mark Sell, Steve Beaton, Bill Ries, Steve Armstrong, Mike McCormick, Eric Michael, Phil Leno, Lance Brown, Mark Douglas, David Hovland, Dave Brown, Pat Michael, Eric Leno, Lance Brown, Doug Schumacher, Doug Roemich, Alan Enger, Dave Benson, Jeff Volk, Greg Smith, Greg Gronland, Duane Roelofsen, Mark Jensen, Jeff Volk, Don Cichos, Jeff Volk, Mark Johnson, Jeff Volk, Dan Lennus, Mark Malme, Brad Malme, Jeff Volk, Randy Carlson, and many others as listed on the Hall of Fame plaque.

== Awards and honors ==
- Terry Babler – Team MVP
- Paul Leier – All-NDCAC
- Jim Thies – All-NDCAC; NAIA Honorable Mention All-American
- Steve Guenther – All-NDCAC; NAIA Honorable Mention All-American
- Jeff Pederson – NAIA Academic All-American
