= 1976 Valley City State Vikings football team =

American college football season

1976 Valley City State Vikings football
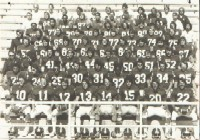

NDCAC champion

NAIA Division II Semifinal, L 39–40 ^{OT} at Redlands
- Conference: North Dakota College Athletic Conference
- Record: 8–2 (6–0 NDCAC)
- Head coach: Jim Dew (3rd season)
- Home stadium: Lokken Stadium

1976 North Dakota College Athletic Conference football standings
	Conf.					Overall
Team	W		L		T	W		L		T
No. 5 Valley City State $^	6	–	0	–	0	8	–	2	–	0
Minot State	5	–	1	–	0	6	–	3	–	0
Jamestown	4	–	2	–	0	6	–	3	–	0
Mayville State	3	–	3	–	0	3	–	5	–	0
Dickinson State	2	–	4	–	0	4	–	4	–	1
Wahpeton Science	1	–	5	–	0	4	–	5	–	0
Bismarck JC	0	–	6	–	0	1	–	7	–	0
$ – Conference champion; ^ – NAIA Division II playoff participant; Rankings from NAIA Division II poll

The 1976 Valley City State Vikings football team represented Valley City State College—now known as Valley City State University—as a member of the North Dakota College Athletic Conference NDCAC) during the 1976 NAIA Division II football season. Under third-year head coach Jim Dew, the Vikings posted an 8–2 overall record and a perfect 6–0 mark in conference play, winning the NDCAC championship. Valley City State advanced to the NAIA Division II football national championship playoffs, where the Vikings lost in the semifinals to Redlands in overtime, 40–39. Valley City State was ranked no. 5 in the final NAIA Division II poll.

After an opening the season with a loss to Bemidji State, Valley City State rebounded with a dominant stretch, defeating Wahpeton Science, Minot State, Wisconsin–River Falls, Jamestown, Dickinson State, Bismarck JC, Mayville State, and Huron. The 1976 team was inducted into the Viking Hall of Fame in 1998.

== Schedule ==
Date	Time	Opponent	Site	Result	Attendance	Source
September 11	7:30 p.m.	at Bemidji State*	Bemidji, MN	L 3–34		
September 18		at Wahpeton Science	Wahpeton, ND	W 37–12		
September 25		Minot State	Valley City, ND	W 21–16		
October 2		Wisconsin–River Falls*	Valley City, ND	W 15–14		
October 9	1:30 p.m.	at Jamestown	Taylor Stadium; Jamestown, ND (rivalry)	W 13–10	3,000	
October 16	1:00 p.m.	Dickinson State^{†}	Valley City, ND (rivalry)	W 45–18	3,300	
October 23	2:00 p.m.	at Bismarck JC	Hughes Field; Bismarck , ND	W 42–3		
October 30		Mayville State	Valley City, ND (rivalry)	W 24–0		
November 6		at Huron*	Huron, SD	W 35–6		
November 27	9:00 p.m.	at Redlands*	UR Stadium; Redlands, CA (NAIA Division II Semifinal)	L 39–40 ^{OT}	5,000	
*Non-conference game; ^{†}Homecoming; All times are in Central time

== Personnel ==
=== Coaching staff ===
- Jim Dew: head coach

=== Roster ===
Jon Achter, Bruce Babcock, Bill Beranek, Doug Bergan, Randy Betsinger, Randy Bush, Gus Claymore, P.J. Cunningham, Kevin Evenson, Jerry Holinka, Craig Hougen, Jerome Huck, Eric Jorgenson, Buck Kasowski, David Katzenmeyer, Craig Knudsen, Randy Kottsick, Doug Laber, Jeff Leech, Steve Leier, Dave McClay, Nate McFadden, Paul Moriarty, Ted Naggatz, David Olson, John Overbey, Ken Pettie, Pete Quigley, David Rausch, Mark Stack, Tom Stingl, Tom Stevenson, Kyle Stricklin, Jim Ukestad, Tom Watson, Tim Webber, Tom White, Tom Birkeland, Colby Boeder, Mark Bounds, Perry Brintnell, John Code, Connell Dillard, Doyle Fraddosio, Glenn Hangaard, Dave Hentges, Don Hillman, Tony Huck, Brad Kruger, Brian Kidtbo, Todd Morgan, Brian Midthun, Dean Olstad, Keith Sundquist, and Rick Huether. The team was coached by Jim Dew and assisted by Bob Bruhschwein, Gerry Kringlie, Don Lemnus and Ed Pung. Student assistants were Larry Boschee, Ralph Parenio, Scott Rerick, Tom Studevant, Alan Bjornson, Holly Werner, Steve Willert, Don Huck and Gilbert Kjelden.
