= 1977 Valley City State Vikings football team =

American college football season

1977 Valley City State Vikings football
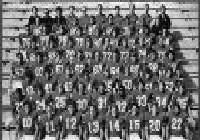

NDCAC champion
- Conference: North Dakota College Athletic Conference
- Record: 9–0 (6–0 NDCAC)
- Head coach: Jim Dew (4th season)
- Home stadium: Lokken Stadium

1977 North Dakota College Athletic Conference football standings
	Conf.					Overall
Team	W		L		T	W		L		T
No. 5 Valley City State $	6	–	0	–	0	9	–	0	–	0
No. 12 Jamestown	4	–	2	–	0	7	–	2	–	0
Wahpeton Science	4	–	2	–	0	6	–	2	–	0
Dickinson State	3	–	3	–	0	4	–	5	–	0
Mayville State	3	–	3	–	0	3	–	5	–	0
Minot State	1	–	5	–	0	2	–	7	–	0
Bismarck JC	0	–	6	–	0	0	–	7	–	0
$ – Conference champion; Rankings from NAIA Division II poll

The 1977 Valley City State Vikings football team was an American football team that represented Valley City State College—now known as Valley City State University—as a member of the North Dakota College Athletic Conference (NDCAC) during the 1977 NAIA Division II football season. In their fourth season under head coach Jim Dew, the Vikings compiled a perfect 9–0 record (6–0 against NDCAC opponents), won the NDCAC championship, and outscored opponents by a total of 333 to 65. They were ranked No. 5 in the final NAIA Division II rankings.

== Schedule ==
Date	Opponent	Site	Result	Source
September 10	Bemidji State*	Valley City, ND	W 17–10	
September 17	Wahpeton Science	Valley City, ND	W 21–14	
September 24	at Minot State	Minot, ND	W 45–0	
October 1	Wisconsin–River Falls*	River Falls, WI	W 27–18	
October 8	Jamestown	Valley City, ND (rivalry)	W 28–14	
October 15	at Dickinson State	Dickinson, ND (rivalry)	W 39–6	
October 22	Bismarck JC	Valley City, ND	W 52–0	
October 29	at Mayville State	Mayville, ND (rivalry)	W 21–3	
November 5	Huron*	Valley City, ND	W 83–0	
*Non-conference game

== Statistics and honors ==
The team featured two of the greatest running backs in Valley City history. John Overbey tallied 3,332 rushing yards (90.1 yards per game) and 150 points scored from 1976 to 1979, and Buck Kasowski tallied 2,401 rushing yards (64.9 yards per game) and 162 points scored from 1974 to 1977. Notable individual achievements by Valley City players during the 1977 season include:

- Buck Kasowski led the team with 80 points and 14 touchdowns (13 rushing, one receiving).
- Ken Aiello rushed for 497 yards on 74 carries, an average of 6.72 yards per carry.
- Tom Stevenson set a school record (broken in 2014) with 35 extra points and an 89.7% conversion percentage.
- Jon Achter set school records with 214 punt return yards and an averarge of 15.29 yards per return. Achter's career average of 15.29 yards per return remains a school record.
- Dave Rausch tallied 147 total tackles (39 unassisted, 108 assisted), ranking second in school history at the time behind his own 1976 total of 163 tackles.

At the end of the season, senior linebacker Dave Rausch was named the most valuable graduating football player in the NDCAC. He played four years of football at Valley State, was captain of the 1977 team, and also won the NDCAC discus title as a member of the school's track and field team. Nine Valley City players were selected as first-team players on the 1977 All-NDCAC football team: Buck Kasowski at running back; Jim Achter at flanker; Jim Ukestad at offensive guard; Dave Olson and Jerry Holinka at offensive tackle; Dave Rausch and Eric Jorgensen at linebacker; Randy Belsinger at defensive line; and Steve Leier at defensive back.

Four Valley City players were also selected as first-team players on the NAIA's All-District 12 football team: Rausch; Dave Olson, tackle; Jon Achter, flanker; and Jim Ukestad.

Jim Ukestad and Dave Rausch were selected as first-team NAIA All-Americans. Jon Achter and Dave Olson also received All-American honors for the 1977 season.
