= 1983 Valley City State Vikings football team =

American college football season

1983 Valley City State Vikings football

NDCAC co-champion
- Conference: North Dakota College Athletic Conference
- Record: 6–3 (5–1 NDCAC)
- Head coach: Jim Dew (10th season)
- Home stadium: Lokken Stadium

1983 North Dakota College Athletic Conference football standings
	Conf.					Overall
Team	W		L		T	W		L		T
No. 15 Minot State +	5	–	1	–	0	7	–	2	–	0
Valley City State +	5	–	1	–	0	6	–	3	–	0
No. 20 Dickinson State	4	–	2	–	0	7	–	2	–	0
Jamestown	4	–	2	–	0	7	–	2	–	0
Mayville State	2	–	4	–	0	4	–	5	–	0
Bismarck JC	1	–	5	–	0	3	–	5	–	0
North Dakota Science	0	–	6	–	0	1	–	8	–	0
+ – Conference co-champions; Rankings from NAIA Division II poll

The 1983 Valley City State Vikings football team represented Valley City State University as a member of the North Dakota College Athletic Conference (NDCAC) during the 1983 college football season. Led by head coach Jim Dew, the Vikings finished 6–3 overall and 5–1 in conference play, earning a share of the NDCAC championship.

After opening the season with a narrow 10–9 loss to Northern State, Valley City State rebounded with a tense 7–3 victory over rival Jamestown to retain the Paint Bucket. The Vikings followed with a 7–6 win over Dickinson State, completing a sweep of their two primary rivals.

The Vikings then reeled off three more NDCAC victories against Bismarck State College, Mayville State, and Minot State before falling to Minot in the final conference game. With a 5–1 league record, Valley City State shared the NDCAC title. Additional wins came against North Dakota Science and Wisconsin–Stout, while a road loss to Southwest Minnesota concluded the season at 6–3 overall.

Team MVP Jim Thies was named First Team All-Conference and a First Team All-American. Additional All-Conference selections included Jed Klein, Mike Smith, Jeff Volk, and Randy Peitz. Klein and Volk earned NAIA Honorable Mention All-American honors, and Mike Smith was recognized as a First Team Academic All-American.

== Schedule ==
Date	Opponent	Site	Result
September 10	at Northern State*	Aberdeen, SD	L 9–10
September 17	Jamestown	Valley City, ND (rivalry)	W 7–3
September 24	at Dickinson State	Dickinson, ND (rivalry)	W 7–6
October 1	Bismarck JC	Valley City, ND	W 41–13
October 8	at Mayville State	Mayville, ND (rivalry)	W 7–2
October 15	North Dakota Science	Valley City, ND	W 47–9
October 22	at Minot State	Minot, ND	L 7–27
October 29	Wisconsin–Stout*	Valley City, ND	W 15–8
November 12	Southwest State*	Valley City, ND	L 6–20
*Non-conference game

== Personnel ==
=== Coaching staff ===
- Jim Dew : head coach

=== Roster ===
Paul Kidel, Dan Gunderson, Mark Sell, Steve Beaton, Bill Ries, Steve Armstrong, Mike McCormick, Eric Michael, Phil Leno, Lance Brown, Mark Douglas, David Hovland, Dave Benson, Pat Michael, Eric Leno, Lance Brown, Doug Schumacher, Doug Roemich, Alan Enger, Jeff Volk, Greg Smith, Greg Gronland, Duane Roelofsen, Mark Jensen, Don Cichos, Mark Johnson, Dan Lennus, Randy Carlson, and others listed on the Hall of Fame roster.

== Awards and honors ==
- Jim Thies – Team MVP, First Team All-Conference, First Team All-American
- Jed Klein – First Team All-Conference, NAIA Honorable Mention All-American
- Mike Smith – First Team All-Conference, First Team Academic All-American
- Jeff Volk – First Team All-Conference, NAIA Honorable Mention All-American
- Randy Peitz – First Team All-Conference
- Additional All-District selections: Thies, Klein, Volk
