= 1954 Valley City State Vikings football team =

American college football season

1954 Valley City State Vikings football
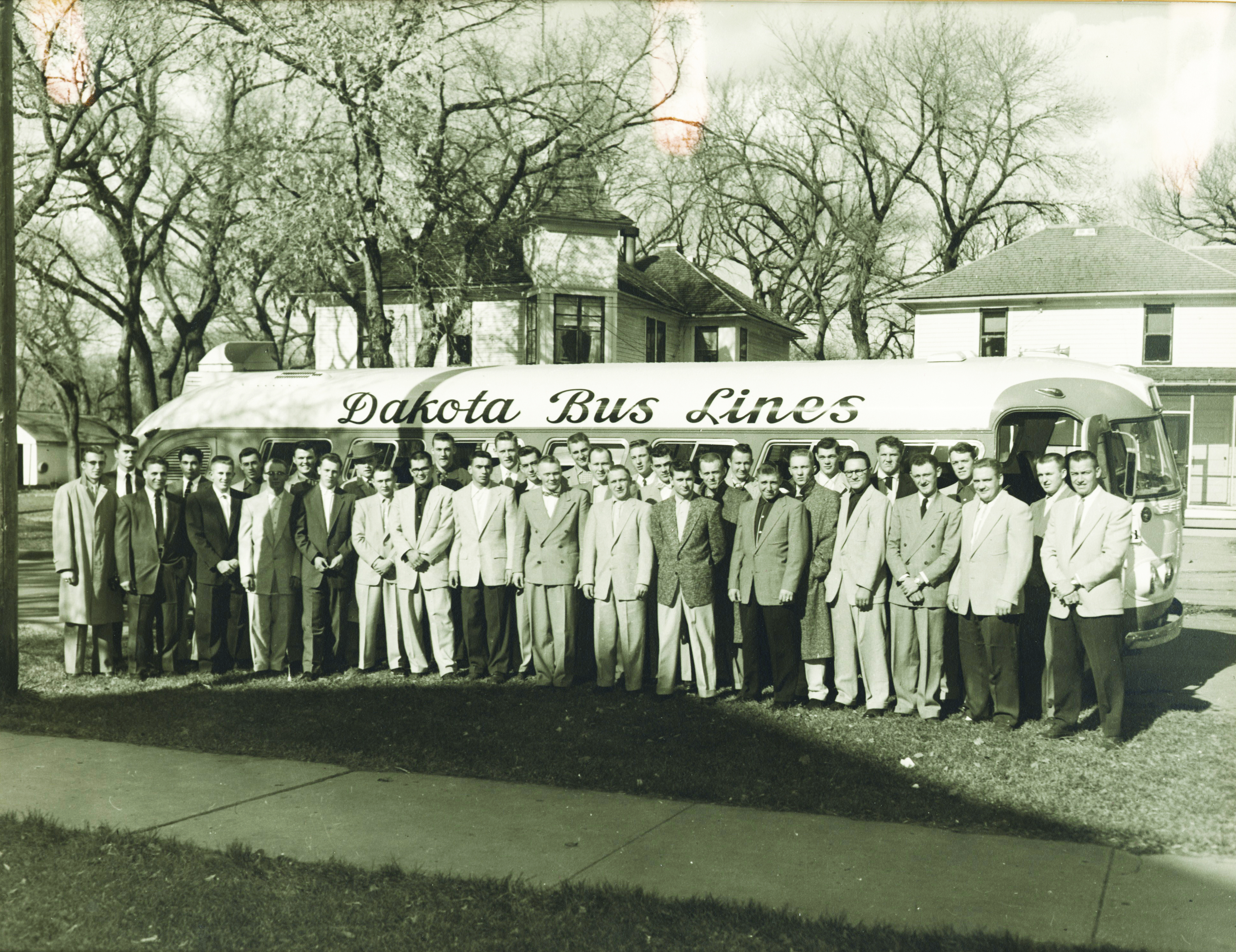

NDIC co-champion
- Conference: North Dakota Intercollegiate Conference
- Record: 7–1 (6–0 NDIC)
- Head coach: Vernon Gale (1st season)
- Home stadium: Hanna Field

1954 North Dakota Intercollegiate Conference football standings
	Conf.					Overall
Team	W		L		T	W		L		T
Valley City State +	6	–	0	–	0	7	–	1	–	0
Minot State +	6	–	0	–	0	6	–	1	–	0
Jamestown	5	–	1	–	0	6	–	2	–	0
Wahpeton Science	4	–	2	–	0	5	–	2	–	0
Dickinson State	3	–	3	–	0	3	–	4	–	0
Ellendale	1	–	5	–	0	2	–	3	–	1
Mayville State	1	–	5	–	0	1	–	5	–	0
Bottineau	1	–	5	–	0	1	–	5	–	0
Bismarck JC	0	–	6	–	0	0	–	6	–	0
+ – Conference co-champions; Valley City State beat Jamestown on November 4 in a non-conference game.

The 1954 Valley City State Teachers College Vikings football team represented Valley City State Teachers College—now known as Valley City State University—as a member of the North Dakota Intercollegiate Conference (NDIC) during the 1954 college football season. In their first season under head coach Vernon Gale, the Vikings compiled an overall record of 7–1 overall with a perfect mark of 6–0 in conference play, sharing the NDIC title with |Minot State.

Valley City State earned victories over Ellendale, Bottineau, Wahpeton Science, Mayville State, Dickinson State, Bismarck JC, and Jamestown. The Vikings' lone loss came in a 14–12 contest against Huron. Three Vikings earned all-conference honors: Bob King, Jerry Olson, and La Roi Robertson.

== Schedule ==
Date	Opponent	Site	Result	Source
September 17	Ellendale	Valley City, ND	W 26–7	
September 24	at Bottineau	Bottineau, ND	W 46–0	
September 30	at Wahpeton Science	Wahpeton, ND	W 19–6	
October 7	Huron*	Valley City, ND	L 12–14	
October 16	Mayville State	Valley City, ND (rivaly)	W 27–6	
October 23	Dickinson State	Valley City, ND (rivaly)	W 32–12	
October 29	at Bismarck JC	Hughes Field; Bismarck, ND	W 39–0	
November 4	Jamestown*	Valley City, ND (rivaly)	W 32–13	
*Non-conference game

== Awards and honors ==
=== NDIC First-Team All-Conference ===
- Bob King
- Jerry Olson
- La Roi Robertson
