= 1978 Valley City State Vikings football team =

American college football season

1978 Valley City State Vikings football
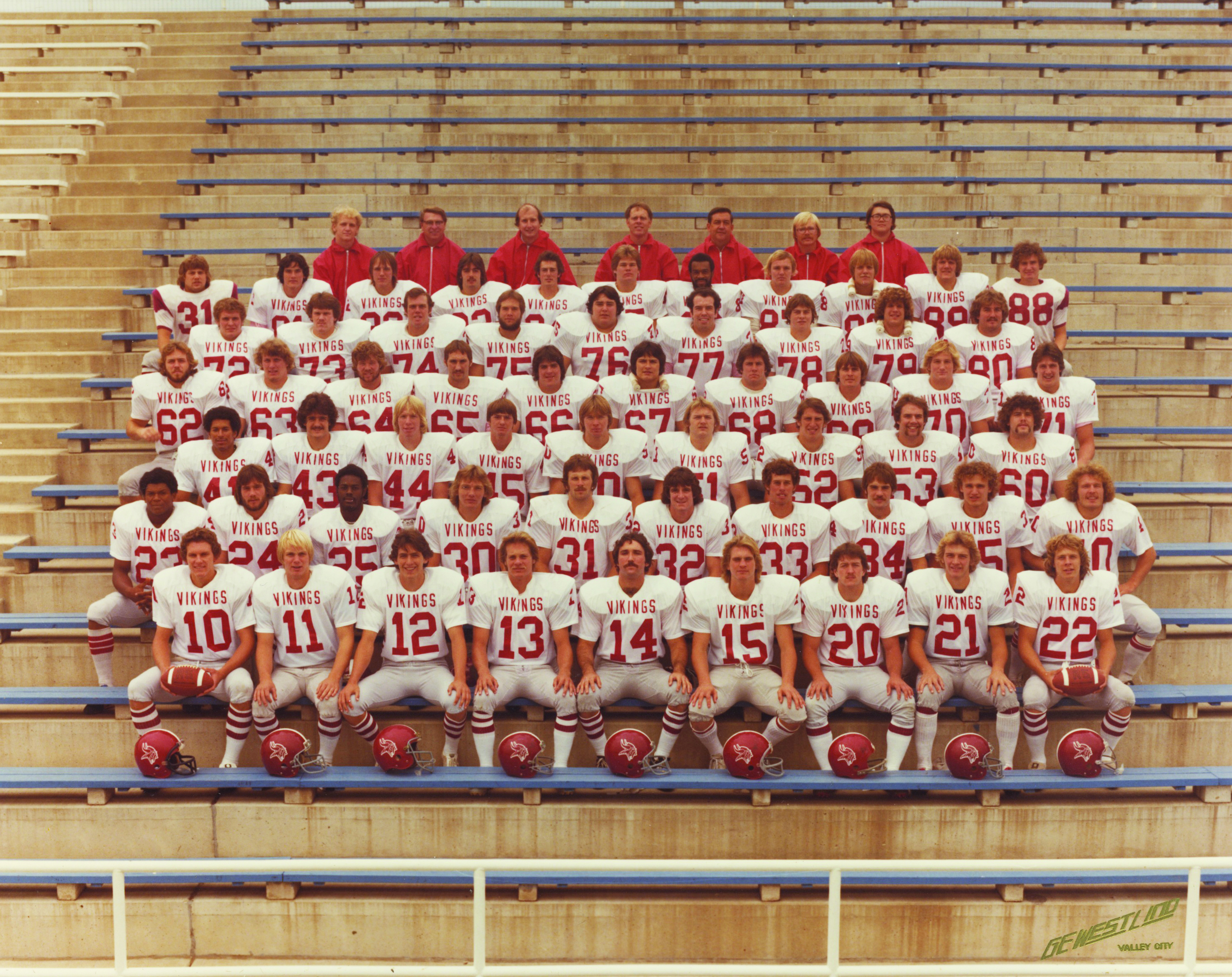

NDCAC champion
- Conference: North Dakota College Athletic Conference
- Record: 8–0–1 (5–0 NDCAC)
- Head coach: Jim Dew (5th season)
- Home stadium: Lokken Stadium

1978 North Dakota College Athletic Conference football standings
| | Conf. | | | | | Overall |
| Team | W | | L | | T | W | | L | | T |
|---|---|---|---|---|---|---|---|---|---|---|
| No. 10 Valley City State $ | 6 | – | 0 | – | 0 | 8 | – | 0 | – | 1 |
| No. 12 Jamestown | 5 | – | 1 | – | 0 | 8 | – | 1 | – | 0 |
| Dickinson State | 4 | – | 2 | – | 0 | 5 | – | 4 | – | 0 |
| Minot State | 3 | – | 3 | – | 0 | 3 | – | 4 | – | 1 |
| Wahpeton Science | 2 | – | 4 | – | 0 | 2 | – | 6 | – | 0 |
| Mayville State | 1 | – | 5 | – | 0 | 1 | – | 6 | – | 1 |
| Bismarck JC | 0 | – | 6 | – | 0 | 1 | – | 6 | – | 0 |
$ – Conference champion; Rankings from NAIA Division II poll

The 1978 Valley City State Vikings football team represented Valley City State University in the 1978 NAIA Division II football season. Led by third-year head coach Jim Dew, the Vikings completed the season undefeated at 8–0–1 and won the North Dakota College Athletic Conference (NDCAC) championship. They finished the year ranked No. 9 in the NAIA Division II poll but were not selected for the national playoffs, which expanded to eight teams for the first time in 1978.

The Vikings opened the season with a non-conference win over Bemidji State and then started NDCAC play with a victory against Minot State. Their lone non-win came in a 7–7 tie at Northern State, where the Wolves declined overtime (overtime was not yet standard in college football). The following week, Valley City State earned one of the most dramatic victories in program history—defeating nationally ranked Jamestown 14–13 on the road with two fourth-quarter touchdowns and a clutch PAT conversion.

Valley City State then defeated Dickinson State, Bismarck State, Mayville State and North Dakota Science to complete their undefeated season. The 1978 team contributed to streaks of **26 straight regular-season games without a loss** and **18 consecutive conference victories**.

All-Conference performers included Eric Jorgenson, Pete Hughes, Kyle Stricklin, Mike Puetz, Lyall Krueger, Nate McFadden, Tom Stevenson and Dave Zinke. Jorgenson, Puetz and Hughes were named All-District, and Jorgenson earned NAIA First-Team All-American honors.

Valley City State produced strong statistical performances throughout the season, combining an efficient offense with a physical defense that held opponents to 94 total points. The dramatic victory over Jamestown—then ranked 14th nationally—served as the defining moment of the season, while the dominant finish in NDCAC play secured the program's third straight conference title.

== Schedule ==
| Date | Opponent | Site | Result |
|---|---|---|---|
| September 9 | at Bemidji State* | Bemidji, MN | W 23–14 |
| September 16 | Minot State | Valley City, ND | W 20–0 |
| September 23 | at Northern State* | Aberdeen, SD | T 7–7 |
| September 30 | Jamestown | Jamestown, ND (rivalry) | W 14–13 |
| October 7 | Dickinson State | Valley City, ND (rivalry) | W 20–12 |
| October | Bismarck JC | | W 28–7 |
| October 21 | at Mayville State | Valley City, ND (rivalry) | W 34–0 |
| November | Wahpeton Science | | W 38–21 |
| November 4 | Eastern Montana* | Valley City, ND | W 48–27 |
*Non-conference game

== Awards and honors ==
NDCAC First-Team All-Conference

- Eric Jorgenson
- Pete Hughes
- Kyle Stricklin
- Mike Puetz
- Lyall Krueger
- Nate McFadden
- Tom Stevenson
- Dave Zinke

NAIA All-District 12

- Eric Jorgenson
- Mike Puetz
- Pete Hughes

NAIA First-Team All-American

- Eric Jorgenson
