= 1984 Valley City State Vikings football team =

American college football season

1984 Valley City State Vikings football

NDCAC co-champion
- Conference: North Dakota College Athletic Conference
- Record: 5–4 (5–1 NDCAC)
- Head coach: Jim Dew (11th season)
- Home stadium: Lokken Stadium

1984 North Dakota College Athletic Conference football standings
	Conf.					Overall
Team	W		L		T	W		L		T
No. 9 Jamestown +	5	–	1	–	0	8	–	1	–	0
Valley City State +	5	–	1	–	0	5	–	4	–	0
Minot State	4	–	2	–	0	6	–	2	–	1
Dickinson State	4	–	2	–	0	6	–	3	–	0
NDSCS–Wahpeton	2	–	4	–	0	?	–	?	–	?
Mayville State	1	–	5	–	0	4	–	5	–	0
Bismarck JC	0	–	6	–	0	1	–	7	–	0
+ – Conference co-champions; Rankings from NAIA Division II poll

The 1984 Valley City State Vikings football team represented Valley City State University as a member of the North Dakota College Athletic Conference (NDCAC) during the 1984 college football season. Led by 11th-year head coach Jim Dew, the Vikings finished 5–4 overall and 5–1 in conference play, earning a share of the NDCAC championship. The 1984 season capped a run of three straight league titles from 1982–84, marking one of only four such streaks in program history.

For the third straight season, Valley City State opened with Northern State—this time falling 19–7. The Vikings, however, recovered quickly by winning their conference opener in a tight 9–7 battle with Dickinson State.

VCSU followed with four more consecutive NDCAC victories, including a homecoming win over defending co-champion Minot State. With a 5–1 league record, the Vikings earned a share of the NDCAC title despite late-season non-conference losses to Minnesota State–Moorhead and Jamestown.

The season concluded with a 39–14 loss to national power Northwestern (IA). Overall, the Vikings finished 5–4.

The team MVP honor was shared by Jeff Volk and Pat O’Brien. All-Conference selections included Pat Horner, Pat O’Brien, Chris Lima, Steve Becher, and Troy Johnson. O’Brien, Becher, and Horner also earned All-District recognition, with Horner and O’Brien receiving NAIA Honorable Mention All-American honors. Academic All-American awards went to Bill Hiser and Jerry Krosbakken.

== Schedule ==
Date	Opponent	Site	Result
September 8	Northern State*	Valley City, ND	L 7–19
September 15	Dickinson State	Valley City, ND (rivalry)	W 9–7
September 22	at Bismarck JC	Bismarck, ND	W 47–18
September 29	Mayville State	Valley City, ND (rivalry)	W 35–15
October 6	at NDSCS–Wahpeton	Wahpeton, ND	W 40–14
October 13	Minot State	Valley City, ND	W 31–10
October 20	at Moorhead State*	Moorhead, MN	L 7–37
October 27	at Jamestown	Jamestown, ND (rivalry)	L 13–21
November 3	at Northwestern (IA)*	Orange City, IA	L 14–39
*Non-conference game

== Personnel ==
=== Coaching staff ===
- Jim Dew: head coach

=== Roster ===
Jeff Volk, Pat O’Brien, Pat Horner, Chris Lima, Steve Becher, Troy Johnson, Bill Hiser, Jerry Krosbakken

== Awards and honors ==
- Jeff Volk – Team MVP, All-Conference
- Pat O’Brien – Team MVP, All-Conference, All-District, Honorable Mention All-American
- Pat Horner – All-Conference, All-District, Honorable Mention All-American
- Chris Lima – All-Conference
- Steve Becher – All-Conference, All-District
- Troy Johnson – All-Conference
- Bill Hiser – Academic All-American
- Jerry Krosbakken – Academic All-American
