= Interstate Athletic Conference (college) =

Athletic conference in Minnesota and North Dakota, 1911–1931

The Interstate Athletic Conference, also called the Interstate Intercollegiate Conference, was a college athletic conference that operated from 1911 to 1931 with member schools located in the states of Minnesota and North Dakota. The conference was formed on December 2, 1911, at a meeting held in Valley City, North Dakota. The six charter members were Concordia College of Moorhead, Minnesota, Ellendale Industrial Normal School (later known as North Dakota State Normal and Industrial School) of Ellendale, North Dakota, Mayville State Normal School (now known as Mayville State University) of Mayville, North Dakota, Moorhead State Normal School (now known as Minnesota State University Moorhead) of Moorhead, Valley City State Normal School (now known as Valley City State University) of Valley City, and Wahpeton State Science School (now known as North Dakota State College of Science) of Wahpeton, North Dakota.

Park Region Luther College of Fergus Falls, Minnesota was admitted to the conference in November 1926. Moorhead State and Park Region withdrew from the conference in 1931. The remaining members, all located in North Dakota, organized a new conference in November 1931, the North Dakota Intercollegiate Athletic Conference (NDIAC), which was later known as the North Dakota Intercollegiate Conference (NDIC) and ultimately as the North Dakota College Athletic Conference (NDCAC).

== Football champions ==
- 1924: Moorhead State
- 1925: Moorhead State and Wahpeton
- 1926: Valley City State
- 1927: Valley City State
- 1928: Moorhead State
- 1929: Moorhead State
- 1930: Moorhead State

== Yearly football standings ==
1928 Interstate Athletic Conference football standings
	Conf.					Overall
Team	W		L		T	W		L		T
Moorhead State $	4	–	0	–	0	4	–	1	–	1
Valley City State	5	–	1	–	0	5	–	2	–	0
Jamestown	4	–	2	–	0	4	–	4	–	0
Wahpeton	3	–	3	–	0	?	–	?	–	?
Minot State	2	–	2	–	1	2	–	2	–	1
Mayville State	1	–	2	–	1	?	–	?	–	?
Dickinson State	1	–	3	–	0	2	–	4	–	0
Ellendale	1	–	3	–	0	?	–	?	–	?
Park Region	0	–	4	–	0	?	–	?	–	?
$ – Conference champion

1930 Interstate Athletic Conference football standings
	Conf.					Overall
Team	W		L		T	W		L		T
Moorhead State $	4	–	0	–	0	5	–	1	–	1
Wahpeton	4	–	2	–	0	?	–	?	–	?
Dickinson State	2	–	1	–	0	3	–	3	–	0
Minot State	3	–	2	–	0	4	–	2	–	0
Valley City State	3	–	2	–	0	3	–	3	–	0
Jamestown	2	–	3	–	0	3	–	4	–	0
Park Region	1	–	2	–	0	?	–	?	–	?
Mayville State	1	–	3	–	0	?	–	?	–	?
Ellendale	0	–	5	–	0	?	–	?	–	?
$ – Conference champion

== See also ==
- List of defunct college football conferences
