= 1988 Valley City State Vikings football team =

American college football season

1988 Valley City State Vikings football
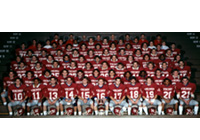

NDCAC champion

NAIA Division II First Round, L 6–31 at Wisconsin–La Crosse
- Conference: North Dakota College Athletic Conference
- Record: 7–3 (6-0 NDCAC)
- Head coach: Jim Dew (15th season)
- Home stadium: Lokken Stadium

1988 North Dakota College Athletic Conference football standings
	Conf.					Overall
Team	W		L		T	W		L		T
No. 17 Valley City State $^	6	–	0	–	0	7	–	3	–	0
No. 16 Dickinson State	5	–	1	–	0	8	–	1	–	0
Minot State	4	–	2	–	0	6	–	3	–	0
Jamestown	3	–	3	–	0	4	–	5	–	0
Mayville State	1	–	5	–	0	3	–	6	–	0
NDSCS–Wahpeton	1	–	5	–	0	3	–	6	–	0
Mary	1	–	5	–	0	2	–	7	–	0
$ – Conference champion; ^ – NAIA Division II playoff participant; Rankings from NAIA Division II poll

The 1988 Valley City State Vikings football team represented Valley City State University during the 1988 NAIA Division II football season. Coached by Jim Dew, the Vikings compiled a 7–3 overall record and won their conference championship, earning a berth in the NAIA National Playoffs.

Valley City State opened the 1988 season with a setback but responded with seven victories, capturing the conference championship. The Vikings earned a spot in the NAIA National Playoffs, cementing their place as one of the top small-college teams in the region.

The team was later inducted into the VCSU Vikings Hall of Fame in recognition of its historic achievements.

== Schedule ==
Date	Opponent	Site	Result
September 10	Northern State*	Valley City, ND	L 13–37
September 17	Minot State	Valley City, ND	W 13–7
September 24	Mayville State	Valley City, ND (rivalry)	W 33–7
October 8	at Jamestown	Jamestown, ND (rivalry)	W 18–13
October 15	at Mary	Bismarck, ND	W 37–23
October 22	Dickinson State	Valley City, ND (rivalry)	W 21–7
October 29	NDSCS–Wahpeton		W 41–10
November 5	at Huron*	Huron, SD	W 35–0
November 12	vs. Southwest State*	Hubert H. Humphrey Metrodome; Minneapolis, MN (Metrodome Classic)	L 19–29
November 19	at Wisconsin–La Crosse*	La Crosse, WI (NAIA Division II First Round)	L 6–31
*Non-conference game

== Personnel ==
=== Coaching staff ===
- Jim Dew – head coach
- Pete Hausrath – assistant coach
- Jerry Areshenko – assistant coach
- Dave Rausch – assistant coach

Student coaches

- Kevin Grage
- Rod Mack
- Pete Leno
- Marty Hochhalter

Support staff

- Team managers: Tom Kessler, Larry Gray
- Trainers: Kelley Peterson, Kelley Utt
- Statistician: Patty Flaagan-Sandoval

=== Roster ===
Members of the 1988 team included Cory Anderson, Pete Anderson, Vance Avera, Daron Bieri, Joel Bladow, Jim Breckheimer, Thomas Brogden, Allen Burgad, Chad Clemenson, Brian Dahl, Torsten Daniels, Larry Delmaire, Mike Dobida, Mark Dufner, Scott Eckman, Thad Engberg, Anthony Fast, Steven Fike, Joe Garcia, Matt Gilbertson, Tom Gilbertson, Eddie Grant, Gene Gregory, Don Guenther, Brian Hall, Bryan Haugen, Greg Hoeckle, Gregg Horner, Tyrone Johnson, Jim Jones, Lloyd Joseph, Terry Kadrmas, Brent Keith, Robbie Keller, Pat Klubben, Don Lennon, Mario Linarte, Don Lingen, Darin Loe, Rich Loomis, John Lopez, Craig Marchetti, Tom Neaton, Bruce Nelson, Paul Olson, John Olstad, Joseph Peterson, Dana Pikarski, Steve Quinn, Pat Richter, Terry Robinson, Scott Roehrich, Frank Rojas, Mike Samson, Tyler Schlecht, Kyle Smith, Bret Sorenson, Mike Sprecher, Mark Tichowsky, Brad Townsend, Mark Ukestad, Scott Wagner, Doug Wendel, Andy Wenzel, Andy Williams, Dave Winarski, and Bryan Zahn.
