= 1977 NAIA Division II football season =

American college football season

- Regular season: August–November 1977
- Postseason: November–December 1977
- National Championship: Thousand Oaks, CA
- Champions: Westminster (PA) (3)

The 1977 NAIA Division II football season was the 22nd season of college football sponsored by the NAIA and the eighth season of play of the NAIA's lower division for football.

The season was played from August to November 1977 and culminated in the 1977 NAIA Division II Football National Championship, played on the campus of California Lutheran University in Thousand Oaks, California.

The Westminster Titans defeated the Cal Lutheran Kingsmen in the championship game, 17–9, to win their third, and second consecutive, NAIA national title.

== Conference changes ==
- The Texas Intercollegiate Athletic Association began play this season, with five members from Texas. The TIAA would remain an NAIA conference until 1996, after which its remaining membership joined the NCAA Division III American Southwest Conference for the 1997 season.

Team	1976 conference	1977 conference
Tarleton State	Lone Star (NAIA Division I)	TIAA (NAIA Division II)
Sul Ross State	Lone Star (NAIA Division I)	TIAA (NAIA Division II)

== Conference standings ==
1977 College Conference of Illinois and Wisconsin football standings
	Conf.					Overall
Team	W		L		T	W		L		T
Illinois Wesleyan +	6	–	2	–	0	6	–	3	–	0
Millikin +	6	–	2	–	0	6	–	3	–	0
North Central (IL)	5	–	3	–	0	6	–	3	–	0
Carthage	4	–	4	–	0	5	–	4	–	0
Wheaton (IL)	4	–	4	–	0	5	–	4	–	0
Elmhurst	4	–	4	–	0	5	–	4	–	0
Augustana (IL)	4	–	4	–	0	4	–	5	–	0
Carroll (WI)	3	–	5	–	0	4	–	5	–	0
North Park	0	–	8	–	0	0	–	9	–	0
+ – Conference co-champions

1977 Frontier Conference football standings
	Conf.					Overall
Team	W		L		T	W		L		T
No. 20 Western Montana $	4	–	0	–	0	6	–	2	–	1
Carroll (MT)	3	–	1	–	0	4	–	4	–	0
Eastern Montana	2	–	2	–	0	2	–	7	–	0
Rocky Mountain	1	–	3	–	0	3	–	6	–	0
Montana Tech	0	–	4	–	0	1	–	8	–	0
$ – Conference champion; Rankings from NAIA Division II poll

1977 Great Lakes Intercollegiate Athletic Conference football standings
	Conf.					Overall
Team	W		L		T	W		L		T
No. 18 Grand Valley State $	4	–	1	–	0	7	–	3	–	0
Wayne State (MI)	3	–	2	–	0	7	–	4	–	0
Hillsdale	2	–	3	–	0	6	–	4	–	0
Northwood	2	–	3	–	0	5	–	4	–	0
Saginaw Valley State	2	–	3	–	0	6	–	5	–	0
Ferris State	2	–	3	–	0	3	–	7	–	0
$ – Conference champion; Rankings from NAIA Division II poll

1977 Heart of America Athletic Conference football standings
	Conf.					Overall
Team	W		L		T	W		L		T
No. 7 Missouri Valley $	6	–	0	–	0	8	–	2	–	0
No. 13 Baker	4	–	2	–	0	8	–	2	–	0
No. T–14 Graceland	4	–	2	–	0	8	–	2	–	0
Ottawa	3	–	3	–	0	5	–	4	–	0
William Jewell	3	–	3	–	0	5	–	5	–	0
Central Methodist	1	–	5	–	0	3	–	5	–	0
Tarkio	0	–	6	–	0	3	–	7	–	0
$ – Conference champion; Rankings from NAIA Division II poll

1977 Hoosier–Buckeye Conference football standings
	Conf.					Overall
Team	W		L		T	W		L		T
Defiance +	6	–	1	–	1	6	–	2	–	1
Findlay +	6	–	1	–	1	6	–	2	–	1
Hanover	6	–	2	–	0	7	–	2	–	0
Wilmington (OH)	6	–	2	–	0	6	–	3	–	0
Taylor	4	–	4	–	0	5	–	4	–	0
Anderson (IN)	3	–	5	–	0	3	–	6	–	0
Bluffton	2	–	6	–	0	3	–	6	–	0
Earlham	2	–	6	–	0	3	–	6	–	0
Manchester (IN)	0	–	8	–	0	0	–	9	–	0
+ – Conference co-champions

1977 Illini–Badger Football Conference standings
	Conf.					Overall
Team	W		L		T	W		L		T
Northeastern Illinois $	4	–	0	–	0	6	–	4	–	0
Milton	3	–	1	–	0	6	–	4	–	0
Eureka	2	–	2	–	0	6	–	4	–	0
Lakeland	1	–	3	–	0	2	–	7	–	0
Concordia (IL)	0	–	4	–	0	2	–	7	–	0
$ – Conference champion

1977 Kansas Collegiate Athletic Conference football standings
	Conf.					Overall
Team	W		L		T	W		L		T
No. 8 Bethany (KS) $	8	–	0	–	0	9	–	1	–	0
Bethel (KS)	7	–	1	–	0	7	–	2	–	0
Southwestern (KS)	6	–	2	–	0	7	–	2	–	0
Friends	5	–	3	–	0	5	–	4	–	0
Sterling	3	–	5	–	0	3	–	6	–	0
Tabor	3	–	5	–	0	3	–	6	–	0
Kansas Wesleyan	2	–	5	–	1	2	–	7	–	1
St. Mary of the Plains	0	–	6	–	2	0	–	7	–	2
McPherson	0	–	7	–	1	0	–	8	–	1
$ – Conference champion; Rankings from NAIA Division II poll

1977 Minnesota Intercollegiate Athletic Conference football standings
	Conf.					Overall
Team	W		L		T	W		L		T
Saint John's (MN) $^	7	–	0	–	0	7	–	2	–	0
Concordia–Moorhead	5	–	2	–	0	7	–	3	–	0
Gustavus Adolphus	5	–	2	–	0	6	–	4	–	0
St. Thomas (MN)	3	–	3	–	1	4	–	5	–	1
Augsburg	3	–	4	–	0	3	–	6	–	0
St. Olaf	2	–	4	–	1	5	–	4	–	1
Hamline	2	–	5	–	0	2	–	7	–	0
Macalester	0	–	7	–	0	0	–	9	–	0
$ – Conference champion; ^ – NCAA Division III playoff participant

1977 Nebraska Intercollegiate Athletic Conference football standings
	Conf.					Overall
Team	W		L		T	W		L		T
No. 19 Midland $	5	–	0	–	0	8	–	2	–	0
Doane	3½	–	1½	–	0	5	–	5	–	0
Hastings	2½	–	2½	–	0	6	–	3	–	0
Dana	2	–	3	–	0	4	–	4	–	0
Nebraska Wesleyan	2	–	3	–	0	2	–	7	–	0
Concordia (NE)	0	–	5	–	0	0	–	9	–	0
$ – Conference champion; Hastings and Doane played twice; each game counted as ½ of a game in the conference standings.; Rankings from NAIA Division II poll

1977 North Dakota College Athletic Conference football standings
	Conf.					Overall
Team	W		L		T	W		L		T
No. 5 Valley City State $	6	–	0	–	0	9	–	0	–	0
No. 12 Jamestown	4	–	2	–	0	7	–	2	–	0
Wahpeton Science	4	–	2	–	0	6	–	2	–	0
Dickinson State	3	–	3	–	0	4	–	5	–	0
Mayville State	3	–	3	–	0	3	–	5	–	0
Minot State	1	–	5	–	0	2	–	7	–	0
Bismarck JC	0	–	6	–	0	0	–	7	–	0
$ – Conference champion; Rankings from NAIA Division II poll

1977 Northwest Conference football standings
	Conf.					Overall
Team	W		L		T	W		L		T
No. 3 Linfield $^	6	–	0	–	0	8	–	1	–	0
Pacific Lutheran	5	–	1	–	0	8	–	2	–	0
Willamette	4	–	2	–	0	5	–	4	–	0
Lewis & Clark	3	–	3	–	0	4	–	4	–	0
College of Idaho	2	–	4	–	0	2	–	6	–	0
Whitworth	1	–	5	–	0	2	–	7	–	0
Pacific (OR)	0	–	6	–	0	2	–	7	–	0
$ – Conference champion; ^ – NAIA Division II playoff participant; Rankings from NAIA Division II poll

1977 South Dakota Intercollegiate Conference football standings
	Conf.					Overall
Team	W		L		T	W		L		T
No. 6 Dakota State $	5	–	0	–	0	10	–	0	–	0
South Dakota Tech	4	–	1	–	0	6	–	3	–	0
Black Hills State	3	–	2	–	0	7	–	3	–	0
Huron	2	–	3	–	0	3	–	6	–	0
Dakota Wesleyan	1	–	4	–	0	5	–	5	–	0
South Dakota–Springfield	0	–	5	–	0	2	–	7	–	0
$ – Conference champion; Rankings from NAIA Division II poll

1977 Southern California Intercollegiate Athletic Conference football standings
	Conf.					Overall
Team	W		L		T	W		L		T
Redlands $	5	–	0	–	0	6	–	3	–	0
No. T–14 Whittier	4	–	1	–	0	8	–	2	–	0
Occidental	3	–	2	–	0	5	–	4	–	0
La Verne	2	–	3	–	0	4	–	5	–	0
Claremont-Mudd	1	–	4	–	0	1	–	7	–	0
Pomona-Pitzer	0	–	5	–	0	0	–	8	–	0
$ – Conference champion; Redlands forfeited two non-conference wins.; Rankings from NAIA Division II poll

1977 Texas Intercollegiate Athletic Association football standings
	Conf.					Overall
Team	W		L		T	W		L		T
Tarleton State $	4	–	0	–	0	7	–	3	–	0
Trinity (TX)	3	–	1	–	0	9	–	2	–	0
McMurry	2	–	2	–	0	6	–	4	–	0
Austin	1	–	3	–	0	1	–	8	–	0
Sul Ross	0	–	4	–	0	2	–	7	–	0
$ – Conference champion

1977 Tri-State Conference football standings
	Conf.					Overall
Team	W		L		T	W		L		T
Northwestern (IA) $	2	–	0	–	0	6	–	4	–	0
Westmar	1	–	1	–	0	2	–	8	–	0
Sioux Falls	0	–	2	–	0	0	–	9	–	0
$ – Conference champion; Northwestern (IA) and Sioux Falls played twice, but only the first meeting counted in the conference standings.

1977 West Virginia Intercollegiate Athletic Conference football standings
	Conf.					Overall
Team	W		L		T	W		L		T
Northern Division
No. 9 West Virginia Wesleyan xy	3	–	1	–	0	7	–	3	–	0
Salem x	3	–	1	–	0	7	–	3	–	0
Shepherd x	3	–	1	–	0	6	–	4	–	0
West Liberty State	1	–	3	–	0	3	–	6	–	1
Fairmont State	0	–	4	–	0	4	–	5	–	0
Southern Division
No. 4 Concord xy$^	4	–	0	–	0	9	–	2	–	1
West Virginia Tech	3	–	1	–	0	4	–	5	–	0
West Virginia State	2	–	2	–	0	3	–	8	–	0
Glenville State	1	–	3	–	0	1	–	8	–	0
Bluefield State	0	–	4	–	0	2	–	7	–	0
Championship: Concord 33, West Virginia Wesleyan 17
$ – Conference champion; x – Division champion/co-champions; y – Championship game participant; ^ – NAIA Division II playoff participant Conference standings based on power ratings; Rankings from NAIA Division II poll

1977 NAIA Division II independents football records
	Conf.			Overall
Team	W	L	T	W		L		T
No. 1 Westminster (PA) ^		–		11	–	0	–	0
No. 17 Illinois College		–		7	–	1	–	0
No. 2 Cal Lutheran ^		–		9	–	2	–	0
No. 10 Chadron State		–		8	–	2	–	0
No. 16 Franklin (IN)		–		8	–	2	–	0
No. 11 Waynesburg		–		7	–	2	–	0
Benedictine (KS)		–		7	–	4	–	0
Georgetown (KY)		–		6	–	4	–	0
Peru State		–		5	–	5	–	0
Azusa Pacific		–		4	–	5	–	0
Texas Lutheran		–		4	–	6	–	0
Simon Fraser		–		3	–	5	–	1
Iowa Wesleyan		–		2	–	7	–	0
Geneva		–		1	–	8	–	0
Oklahoma Panhandle State		–		1	–	8	–	0
^ – NAIA Division II playoff participant; Rankings from NAIA Division II poll

== Conference champions ==
Conference	Champion	Record
Hoosier-Buckeye	Findlay; Defiance	6–1–1
Illini-Badger	Northeastern Illinois	4–0
Kansas	Bethany	8–0
Minnesota	Saint John's (MN)	7–0
Nebraska	Midland Lutheran	5–0
North Dakota	Valley City State	4–0
Pacific Northwest	Linfield	6–0
South Dakota	Dakota State	6–0
SCIAC	Redlands	5–0
Texas	Tarleton State	4–0
WVIAC	Concord	7–1–1

== Postseason ==
Semifinals; Campus sites
Westminster (PA)*	14
Concord	13
Linfield	28
Cal Lutheran*	29

Championship; Thousand Oaks, CA
Westminster (PA)	17
Cal Lutheran*	9

== See also ==
- 1977 NAIA Division I football season
- 1977 NCAA Division I football season
- 1977 NCAA Division II football season
- 1977 NCAA Division III football season
