= Stan Rettew =

Playing career

Football
- 1983: Iowa Wesleyan
- Position: Offensive guard

Coaching career (HC unless noted)

Football
- 1984–1985: Iowa Wesleyan (DC/DL)
- 1986–1988: North Dakota State (GA/LB)
- 1989: Shippensburg (LB/ST)
- 1990–1996: Mayville State (DC)
- 1996–2001: Mayville State
- 2002–2004: Huron
- 2005: Valparaiso (DC)

Baseball
- 1985–1986: Iowa Wesleyan

Softball
- 1994–1998: Mayville State

Administrative career (AD unless noted)
- 1998–2002: Mayville State
- ?–2004: Huron

Head coaching record
- Overall: 18–58 (football); 26–37 (baseball)

Stan Rettew is an American former football, baseball, and softball coach and college athletics administrator. He served as the head football coach at Mayville State University in Mayville, North Dakota in from 1996 to 2001 and Huron University—in Huron, South Dakota from 2002 to 2004, compiling a career college football record of 18–58. Rettew was also the head baseball coach at Iowa Wesleyan College—now known as Iowa Wesleyan University—in Mount Pleasant, Iowa from 1985 to 1986, tallying a mark of 26–27, and the head softball coach at Mayville State from 1994 to 1998.

Rettew attended Warwick High School in Lititz, Pennsylvania, where he played football and was a member of the Lancaster-Lebanon League championship team in 1977. He went on to Salem College—now known as Salem University—Salem, West Virginia before transferring to Iowa Wesleyan.

== Head coaching record ==
Year	Team	Overall	Conference	Standing	Bowl/playoffs
Mayville State Comets (North Dakota College Athletic Conference) (1997–1999)
1996	Mayville State	1–3 (Note: Larry Manfull was Mayville State's head coach for the first six games of the 1996 season before he resigned. Rettew served as the team's head coach for the final four games of the season. Mayville State finished the year 2–8 overall and 0–6 in conference play.)	0–3	7th	
1997	Mayville State	0–10	0–6	7th	
1998	Mayville State	2–8	2–4	T–5th	
1999	Mayville State	2–7	1–4	5th	
Mayville State Comets (Dakota Athletic Conference) (2000–2001)
2000	Mayville State	4–6	4–5	6th	
2001	Mayville State	0–10	0–9	9th	
Mayville State:		9–44	7–31		
Huron Screaming Eagles (Dakota Athletic Conference) (2002–2004)
2002	Huron	3–7	3–6	6th	
2003	Huron	4–6	3–6	T–7th	
2004	Huron	2–1 (Note: Rettew was Huron's head coach for the first three games of the 2004 season before he was fired. Darrin Hicks served as the team's interim head coach for the final seven games of the season. Huron finished the year 4–6 overall and 4–5 in conference play, tying for sixth place.)	2–0		
Huron:		9–14	8–12		
Total:		18–58			
