= 1977 college football season =

1977 college football season may refer to:

- 1977 NCAA Division I football season
- 1977 NCAA Division II football season
- 1977 NCAA Division III football season
- 1977 NAIA Division I football season
- 1977 NAIA Division II football season
