= 1976 college football season =

1976 college football season may refer to:

- 1976 NCAA Division I football season
- 1976 NCAA Division II football season
- 1976 NCAA Division III football season
- 1976 NAIA Division I football season
- 1976 NAIA Division II football season
