= 1988 NAIA Division II football season =

American college football season

- Regular season: August–November 1988
- Postseason: November–December 1988
- National Championship: Memorial Stadium; New Wilmington, PA
- Champions: Westminster (PA) (4)

The 1988 NAIA Division II football season, as part of the 1988 college football season in the United States and the 33rd season of college football sponsored by the NAIA, was the 19th season of play of the NAIA division II for football.

The season was played from August to November 1988 and culminated in the 1988 NAIA Division II Football National Championship, played at the Memorial Stadium on the campus of Westminster College in New Wilmington, Pennsylvania.

The Westminster Titans defeated the Wisconsin–La Crosse Indians in the championship game, 21–14, to win their fourth NAIA national title.

== Conference standings ==
1988 Columbia Football Association standings
	Conf.					Overall
Team	W		L		T	W		L		T
Mount Hood League
No. 12 Oregon Tech x^	6	–	0	–	0	9	–	3	–	0
No. 20 Linfield	4	–	2	–	0	7	–	2	–	0
Southern Oregon	3	–	3	–	0	5	–	4	–	0
Pacific (OR)	3	–	3	–	0	3	–	5	–	1
Western Oregon	3	–	3	–	0	3	–	6	–	0
Willamette	2	–	4	–	0	4	–	5	–	0
Eastern Oregon	0	–	6	–	0	0	–	9	–	0
Mount Rainier League
No. 4 Central Washington x^	6	–	0	–	0	9	–	1	–	0
No. 11 Pacific Lutheran ^	5	–	1	–	0	7	–	3	–	0
Puget Sound	4	–	2	–	0	4	–	5	–	0
Western Washington	3	–	3	–	0	5	–	4	–	0
Whitworth	1	–	5	–	0	3	–	5	–	1
Simon Fraser	1	–	5	–	0	3	–	7	–	0
Lewis & Clark	1	–	5	–	0	2	–	7	–	0
x – League champion/co-champions ^ – NAIA Division II playoff participant; Rankings from NAIA Division II poll

1988 Frontier Conference football standings
	Conf.					Overall
Team	W		L		T	W		L		T
No. 3 Carroll (MT) $^	6	–	0	–	0	10	–	1	–	0
Montana Tech	4	–	2	–	0	6	–	3	–	0
Rocky Mountain	1	–	5	–	0	3	–	8	–	0
Western Montana	1	–	5	–	0	1	–	5	–	0
$ – Conference champion; ^ – NAIA Division II playoff participant; Rankings from NAIA Division II poll

1988 Heart of America Athletic Conference football standings
	Conf.					Overall
Team	W		L		T	W		L		T
No. 10 Baker $^	7	–	0	–	0	9	–	1	–	0
Missouri Valley	5	–	2	–	0	6	–	4	–	0
Tarkio	5	–	2	–	0	5	–	5	–	0
Graceland	4	–	3	–	0	7	–	3	–	0
William Jewell	4	–	3	–	0	5	–	4	–	1
MidAmerica Nazarene	2	–	5	–	0	4	–	6	–	0
Culver–Stockton	1	–	6	–	0	2	–	8	–	0
No. 2 Evangel * ^	0	–	7	–	0	0	–	12	–	0
$ – Conference champion; ^ – NAIA Division II playoff participant Evangel finished the 1988 season with an 11–1 record and a 7–0 mark in HAAC play. In March 1989, the team forfeited all 11 wins and their conference title because it had used two ineligible players.; Rankings from NAIA Division II poll

1988 Kansas Collegiate Athletic Conference football standings
	Conf.					Overall
Team	W		L		T	W		L		T
No. 6 Bethany (KS) $^	9	–	0	–	0	10	–	1	–	0
McPherson	6	–	3	–	0	6	–	4	–	0
Southwestern (KS)	6	–	3	–	0	6	–	4	–	0
St. Mary of the Plains	5	–	4	–	0	6	–	4	–	0
Kansas Wesleyan	5	–	4	–	0	5	–	4	–	0
Bethel (KS)	5	–	4	–	0	5	–	5	–	0
Ottawa	5	–	4	–	0	5	–	5	–	0
Friends	2	–	7	–	0	2	–	8	–	0
Sterling	1	–	8	–	0	1	–	9	–	0
Tabor	1	–	8	–	0	1	–	9	–	0
$ – Conference champion; ^ – NAIA Division II playoff participant; Rankings from NAIA Division II poll

1988 Mid-South Conference football standings
	Conf.					Overall
Team	W		L		T	W		L		T
No. 7 Cumberland (KY) $^	5	–	0	–	0	10	–	1	–	0
No. 24 Georgetown (KY)	4	–	1	–	0	7	–	3	–	0
Evansville	3	–	2	–	0	5	–	5	–	0
Union (KY)	2	–	3	–	0	6	–	4	–	0
Kentucky Wesleyan	1	–	4	–	0	4	–	6	–	0
Campbellsville	0	–	5	–	0	0	–	11	–	0
$ – Conference champion; ^ – NAIA Division II playoff participant; Rankings from NAIA Division II poll

1988 Nebraska Intercollegiate Athletic Conference football standings
	Conf.					Overall
Team	W		L		T	W		L		T
No. 21 Nebraska Wesleyan $^	5	–	0	–	0	7	–	3	–	0
Dana	3	–	2	–	0	6	–	4	–	0
Doane	3	–	2	–	0	4	–	5	–	0
Midland	3	–	2	–	0	4	–	6	–	0
Concordia (NE)	1	–	4	–	0	3	–	6	–	0
Hastings	0	–	5	–	0	3	–	7	–	0
$ – Conference champion; ^ – NAIA Division II playoff participant; Rankings from NAIA Division II poll

1988 North Dakota College Athletic Conference football standings
	Conf.					Overall
Team	W		L		T	W		L		T
No. 17 Valley City State $^	6	–	0	–	0	7	–	3	–	0
No. 16 Dickinson State	5	–	1	–	0	8	–	1	–	0
Minot State	4	–	2	–	0	6	–	3	–	0
Jamestown	3	–	3	–	0	4	–	5	–	0
Mayville State	1	–	5	–	0	3	–	6	–	0
NDSCS–Wahpeton	1	–	5	–	0	3	–	6	–	0
Mary	1	–	5	–	0	2	–	7	–	0
$ – Conference champion; ^ – NAIA Division II playoff participant; Rankings from NAIA Division II poll

1988 South Dakota Intercollegiate Conference football standings
	Conf.					Overall
Team	W		L		T	W		L		T
No. 8 Sioux Falls $^	5	–	0	–	0	9	–	1	–	1
Huron	3	–	2	–	0	7	–	3	–	0
Black Hills State	3	–	2	–	0	3	–	6	–	0
Dakota Wesleyan	3	–	2	–	0	3	–	7	–	0
South Dakota Tech	1	–	4	–	0	1	–	8	–	0
Dakota State	0	–	5	–	0	1	–	9	–	0
$ – Conference champion; ^ – NAIA Division II playoff participant; Rankings from NAIA Division II poll

1988 Texas Intercollegiate Athletic Association football standings
	Conf.					Overall
Team	W		L		T	W		L		T
No. 9 Austin $^	9	–	1	–	0	9	–	2	–	0
Tarleton State	7	–	3	–	0	7	–	3	–	0
Sul Ross	5	–	5	–	0	5	–	5	–	0
Midwestern State	4	–	6	–	0	4	–	6	–	0
Howard Payne	4	–	6	–	0	4	–	7	–	0
McMurry	1	–	9	–	0	1	–	9	–	0
$ – Conference champion; ^ – NAIA Division II playoff participant; Rankings from NAIA Division II poll

1988 Tri-State Athletic Conference football standings
	Conf.					Overall
Team	W		L		T	W		L		T
No. 5 Northwestern (IA) $^	3	–	0	–	0	12	–	1	–	0
Benedictine (KS)	2	–	1	–	0	7	–	3	–	0
Westmar	1	–	2	–	0	4	–	5	–	0
Peru State	0	–	3	–	0	6	–	4	–	0
$ – Conference champion; ^ – NAIA Division II playoff participant; Rankings from NAIA Division II poll

1988 Wisconsin State University Conference football standings
	Conf.					Overall
Team	W		L		T	W		L		T
Wisconsin–Whitewater $^	7	–	1	–	0	9	–	3	–	0
No. 14 Wisconsin–La Crosse *	6	–	2	–	0	11	–	3	–	0
No. 15 Wisconsin–River Falls	6	–	2	–	0	7	–	3	–	0
No. 25 Wisconsin–Stevens Point	5	–	3	–	0	7	–	4	–	0
Wisconsin–Platteville	4	–	4	–	0	6	–	4	–	0
Wisconsin–Oshkosh	4	–	4	–	0	5	–	4	–	1
Wisconsin–Eau Claire	3	–	5	–	0	5	–	5	–	0
Wisconsin–Stout	1	–	7	–	0	2	–	8	–	0
Wisconsin–Superior	0	–	8	–	0	0	–	10	–	0
$ – Conference champion; ^ – NCAA Division III playoff participant; * – NAIA Division II playoff participant; Rankings from NAIA Division II poll

1988 NAIA Division II independents football records
	Conf.			Overall
Team	W	L	T	W		L		T
No. 1 Westminster (PA) ^		–		14	–	0	–	0
No. 19 Azusa Pacific		–		7	–	1	–	0
No. 13 Bluffton ^		–		9	–	2	–	0
Geneva		–		8	–	2	–	0
No. 23 Wilmington (OH)		–		7	–	2	–	1
Franklin (IN)		–		7	–	3	–	0
St. Francis (IL)		–		6	–	4	–	0
Chadron State		–		5	–	5	–	0
Findlay		–		3	–	6	–	0
St. Ambrose		–		2	–	6	–	1
Tiffin		–		2	–	8	–	0
Waynesburg		–		2	–	8	–	0
Oklahoma Panhandle State		–		1	–	7	–	0
Iowa Wesleyan		–		0	–	10	–	0
^ – NAIA Division II playoff participant; Rankings from NAIA Division II poll

== Conference champions ==
Conference	Champion	Record
Columbia	Mount Rainier League: Central Washington; Mount Hood League: Oregon Tech	6–0; 6–0
Frontier	Carroll (MT)	6–0
Heart of America	Evangel	7–0
Illini-Badger	Concordia–Wisconsin	8–1
Kansas	Bethany	9–0
Mid-South	Cumberland (KY)	5–0
Nebraska	Nebraska Wesleyan	5–0
North Dakota	Valley City State	6–0
South Dakota	Sioux Falls	5–0
Tri-State	Northwestern (IA)	3–0
WSUC	Wisconsin–Whitewater	7–1

== Rankings ==
Final NAIA Division II poll rankings:

Rank	Team (first place votes)	Record (thru Nov. 12)	Points
1	Westminster (PA) (16)	10–0	518
2	Evangel	9–0	486
3	Carroll (MT) (3)	9–0	474
4	Central Washington (1)	9–0	466
5	Northwestern (IA) (1)	10–0	452
6	Bethany (KS)	9–0	418
7	Cumberland (KY)	10–0	404
8	Sioux Falls	9–0–1	370
9	Austin	9–1	340
10	Baker	8–1	332
11	Pacific Lutheran	7–2	332
12	Oregon Tech	7–2	270
13	Bluffton	8–1	254
14	Wisconsin–La Crosse	8–2	241
15	Wisconsin–River Falls	7–3	211
16	Dickinson State	7–1	200
17	Valley City State	7–2	187
18	Concordia (WI)	8–1	162
19	Azusa Pacific	7–1	130
20	Linfield	7–2	129
21	Nebraska Wesleyan	7–2	118
22	Greenville	8–1	117
23	Wilmington (OH)	7–2–1	79
24	Georgetown (KY)	7–3	77
25	Wisconsin–Stevens Point	7–4	29

== Postseason ==
First Round; Campus sites
Pacific Lutheran	35
Oregon Tech*	56
Central Washington	7
Carroll (MT)*	28
Sioux Falls	9
Northwestern (IA)*	14
Valley City State	6
Wisconsin–La Crosse*	31
Nebraska Wesleyan	14
Evangel*	45
Baker	19
Bethany*	21
Bluffton	30
Cumberland (KY)*	14
Austin	12
Westminster (PA)*	34

Quarterfinals; Campus sites
Oregon Tech	70
Carroll (MT)*	35
Northwestern (IA)*	33
Wisconsin–La Crosse	45
Evangel*	22
Bethany	10
Bluffton	7
Westminster (PA)*	40

Semifinals; Campus sites
Oregon Tech*	24
Wisconsin–La Crosse	37
Evangel	9
Westminster (PA)*	26

Championship; New Wilmington, PA
Wisconsin–La Crosse	14
Westminster (PA)*	21

== See also ==
- 1988 NAIA Division I football season
- 1988 NCAA Division I-A football season
- 1988 NCAA Division I-AA football season
- 1988 NCAA Division II football season
- 1988 NCAA Division III football season
