= James Ployhar =

American composer, music educator anr film producer

James D. Ployhar (September 22, 1926 – January 2, 2007) was an American composer, music educator, and film producer. He was responsible for many pieces of music well known to American band students, including "Cool Blues for Trumpets", "March of the Irish Guard", "Crazy Clock", and "Korean Folk Song Medley".

== Biography ==
Ployhar attended Valley City State University in Valley City, North Dakota, and was initiated into the Beta Rho chapter of Phi Mu Alpha Sinfonia music fraternity in 1952. He earned a master's degree from the University of Northern Colorado, and did doctoral study at UCLA. Ployhar was president of the VCSC Alumni Association from 1975 to 1976 and a member of the V-500 Foundation. On May 20, 1977, he was given the Distinguished Alumnus Award at Valley City State University.

A public-school teacher of nineteen years, Ployhar was a writer in the field of music education and authored Contemporary Band Course. He received the citation of excellence by the executive committee of the National Band Association.

He co-produced the 1994 Disney film Iron Will.

Ployhar died January 2, 2007, in Fargo, North Dakota
