= 1982 NAIA Division II football season =

American college football season

- Regular season: August–November 1982
- Postseason: November–December 1982
- National Championship: Maxwell Field; McMinnville, OR
- Champions: Linfield

The 1982 NAIA Division II football season, as part of the 1982 college football season in the United States and the 27th season of college football sponsored by the NAIA, was the 13th season of play of the NAIA's lower division for football.

The season was played from August to November 1982 and culminated in the 1982 NAIA Division II Football National Championship, played at Maxwell Field on the campus of Linfield College in McMinnville, Oregon.

Linfield defeated William Jewell in the championship game, 33–15, to win their first NAIA national title.

== Conference standings ==
1982 Frontier Conference football standings
	Conf.					Overall
Team	W		L		T	W		L		T
Carroll (MT) +	4	–	2	–	0	5	–	5	–	0
Western Montana	4	–	2	–	0	5	–	5	–	0
Montana Tech	3	–	3	–	0	4	–	6	–	0
Rocky Mountain	1	–	5	–	0	2	–	7	–	0
$ – Conference champion

1982 Heart of America Athletic Conference football standings
	Conf.					Overall
Team	W		L		T	W		L		T
No. 6 William Jewell $^	6	–	1	–	0	10	–	2	–	0
No. 20 Graceland	5	–	2	–	0	7	–	2	–	0
Baker	5	–	2	–	0	7	–	3	–	0
Missouri Valley	5	–	2	–	0	6	–	3	–	0
MidAmerica Nazarene	3	–	4	–	0	5	–	5	–	0
Tarkio	3	–	4	–	0	4	–	5	–	0
Central Methodist	1	–	6	–	0	2	–	7	–	0
Culver–Stockton	0	–	7	–	0	0	–	10	–	0
$ – Conference champion; ^ – NAIA Division II playoff participant; Rankings from NAIA Division II poll

1982 Hoosier–Buckeye Conference football standings
	Conf.					Overall
Team	W		L		T	W		L		T
No. 10 Findlay +	7	–	1	–	0	8	–	1	–	0
No. 8 Wilmington (OH) +^	7	–	1	–	0	8	–	2	–	0
No. 17 Hanover	6	–	2	–	0	7	–	2	–	0
Defiance	4	–	4	–	0	5	–	4	–	0
Anderson (IN)	4	–	4	–	0	4	–	5	–	0
Taylor	3	–	5	–	0	4	–	5	–	0
Bluffton	3	–	5	–	0	3	–	6	–	0
Manchester (IN)	2	–	6	–	0	2	–	7	–	0
Earlham	0	–	8	–	0	0	–	9	–	0
+ – Conference co-champions; ^ – NAIA Division II playoff participant; Rankings from NAIA Division II poll

1982 Illini–Badger Football Conference standings
	Conf.					Overall
Team	W		L		T	W		L		T
Northeastern Illinois $	4	–	0	–	0	5	–	5	–	0
No. 19 Concordia (WI)	3	–	1	–	0	7	–	2	–	0
Concordia (IL)	2	–	2	–	0	4	–	4	–	0
Lakeland	1	–	3	–	0	3	–	6	–	0
Eureka	0	–	4	–	0	1	–	7	–	0
$ – Conference champion; Rankings from NAIA Division II poll

1982 Kansas Collegiate Athletic Conference football standings
	Conf.					Overall
Team	W		L		T	W		L		T
Southwestern (KS) +	8	–	1	–	0	9	–	2	–	0
Kansas Wesleyan +	8	–	1	–	0	8	–	2	–	0
Sterling	7	–	2	–	0	7	–	2	–	0
Friends	5	–	4	–	0	5	–	4	–	0
Bethany (KS)	5	–	4	–	0	5	–	5	–	0
Ottawa	4	–	5	–	0	4	–	6	–	0
Tabor	4	–	5	–	0	4	–	6	–	0
Bethel (KS)	3	–	6	–	0	3	–	6	–	0
St. Mary of the Plains	1	–	8	–	0	1	–	9	–	0
McPherson	0	–	9	–	0	0	–	9	–	0
+ – Conference co-champions

1982 Minnesota Intercollegiate Athletic Conference football standings
	Conf.					Overall
Team	W		L		T	W		L		T
No. 3 Saint John's (MN) $^	8	–	0	–	0	9	–	1	–	0
No. 12 St. Thomas (MN)	6	–	2	–	0	8	–	2	–	0
Gustavus Adolphus	6	–	2	–	0	6	–	4	–	0
Concordia–Moorhead	5	–	3	–	0	6	–	4	–	0
Hamline #	5	–	3	–	0	6	–	4	–	0
Augsburg	2	–	5	–	1	2	–	7	–	1
Bethel (MN)	1	–	6	–	1	1	–	8	–	1
Macalester	1	–	7	–	0	2	–	8	–	0
St. Olaf	1	–	7	–	0	2	–	8	–	0
Carleton *	0	–	0	–	0	6	–	2	–	0
$ – Conference champion; ^ – NAIA Division II playoff participant # – Hamline initially forfeited 5 conference wins—over Augsburg, St. Olaf, Macalester, Concordia–Moorhead, and Bethel (MN)—because a player was ruled ineligible under NAIA rules, but the player was later ruled eligible under MIAC code, and the wins were restored to Hamline. * – ineligible for conference title; Rankings from NAIA Division II poll

1982 Nebraska Intercollegiate Athletic Conference football standings
	Conf.					Overall
Team	W		L		T	W		L		T
Midland $	4	–	1	–	0	5	–	4	–	0
Concordia (NE)	3	–	2	–	0	7	–	3	–	0
Doane	3	–	2	–	0	7	–	4	–	0
Hastings	3	–	2	–	0	5	–	4	–	0
Nebraska Wesleyan	2	–	3	–	0	4	–	5	–	0
Dana	0	–	5	–	0	2	–	7	–	0
$ – Conference champion

1982 North Dakota College Athletic Conference football standings
	Conf.					Overall
Team	W		L		T	W		L		T
No. 11 Dickinson State +	5	–	1	–	0	8	–	1	–	0
Valley City State +	5	–	1	–	0	6	–	2	–	0
Jamestown	4	–	2	–	0	6	–	3	–	0
Mayville State	3	–	3	–	0	6	–	3	–	0
Minot State	3	–	3	–	0	4	–	4	–	0
North Dakota Science	1	–	5	–	0	3	–	5	–	1
Bismarck JC	0	–	6	–	0	3	–	6	–	0
+ – Conference co-champions; Rankings from NAIA Division II poll

1982 Northwest Conference football standings
	Conf.					Overall
Team	W		L		T	W		L		T
No. 2 Linfield $^	5	–	0	–	0	12	–	0	–	0
No. 13 Pacific Lutheran	4	–	1	–	0	7	–	2	–	0
Whitworth	3	–	2	–	0	5	–	4	–	0
Pacific (OR)	2	–	3	–	0	2	–	7	–	0
Lewis & Clark	1	–	4	–	0	2	–	7	–	0
Willamette	0	–	5	–	0	1	–	8	–	0
$ – Conference champion; ^ – NAIA Division II playoff participant; Rankings from NAIA Division II poll

1982 South Dakota Intercollegiate Conference football standings
	Conf.					Overall
Team	W		L		T	W		L		T
No. 14 South Dakota Tech $	7	–	0	–	0	7	–	2	–	0
No. 9 Sioux Falls	6	–	1	–	0	9	–	1	–	0
Yankton	5	–	2	–	0	8	–	2	–	0
Dakota State	4	–	3	–	0	5	–	5	–	0
Huron	3	–	4	–	0	5	–	5	–	0
Black Hills State	2	–	5	–	0	2	–	7	–	0
Dakota Wesleyan	1	–	6	–	0	1	–	9	–	0
South Dakota–Springfield	0	–	7	–	0	0	–	10	–	0
$ – Conference champion; Rankings from NAIA Division II poll

1982 Texas Intercollegiate Athletic Association football standings
	Conf.					Overall
Team	W		L		T	W		L		T
No. 4 Sul Ross $^	8	–	0	–	0	8	–	1	–	0
No. 15 Austin	6	–	2	–	0	7	–	2	–	0
Tarleton State	4	–	4	–	0	4	–	4	–	0
McMurry	2	–	6	–	0	2	–	8	–	0
Lubbock Christian	0	–	8	–	0	0	–	10	–	0
$ – Conference champion; ^ – NAIA Division II playoff participant; Rankings from NAIA Division II poll

1982 NAIA Division II independents football records
	Conf.			Overall
Team	W	L	T	W		L		T
No. 1 Northwestern (IA) ^		–		12	–	1	–	0
No. 5 Cal Lutheran ^		–		9	–	2	–	0
No. 7 Westminster (PA) ^		–		9	–	2	–	0
No. 18 Chadron State		–		6	–	2	–	0
Loras		–		7	–	3	–	0
Azusa Pacific		–		5	–	3	–	0
Benedictine (KS)		–		6	–	4	–	0
No. 16 Oklahoma Panhandle State		–		7	–	5	–	0
Waynesburg		–		4	–	4	–	1
Geneva		–		4	–	5	–	0
Texas Lutheran		–		4	–	5	–	0
Iowa Wesleyan		–		2	–	8	–	0
Simon Fraser		–		2	–	8	–	0
Peru State		–		1	–	8	–	0
Westmar		–		0	–	9	–	1
^ – NAIA Division II playoff participant; Rankings from NAIA Division II poll

== Conference champions ==
Conference	Champion	Record
Frontier	Carroll (MT); Montana Western	4–2
Heart of America	William Jewell	6–1
Hoosier-Buckeye	Findlay; Wilmington (OH)	7–1
Kansas	Southwestern (KS); Kansas Wesleyan	8–1
Nebraska	Midland Lutheran	4–1
North Dakota	Dickinson State; Valley City State	5–1
Pacific Northwest	Linfield	5–0
South Dakota	South Dakota Tech	7–0
Texas	Sul Ross	8–0

== Postseason ==
Quarterfinals; Campus sites
Saint John's (MN)	28
Northwestern (IA)*	33
William Jewell	44
Sul Ross*	43
Wilmington (OH)	7
Westminster (PA)*	14
Cal Lutheran	16
Linfield*	20

Semifinals; Campus sites
Northwestern (IA)	10
William Jewell*	23
Westminster (PA)	9
Linfield*	37

Championship; McMinnville, OR
William Jewell	15
Linfield*	33

== See also ==
- 1982 NAIA Division I football season
- 1982 NCAA Division I-A football season
- 1982 NCAA Division I-AA football season
- 1982 NCAA Division II football season
- 1982 NCAA Division III football season
