= Ole Aarsvold =

American politician (1940–2025)

Member of the North Dakota House of Representatives from the 20th district
- In office 1989–2008

Personal details
- Born: November 6, 1940 Mayville, North Dakota, U.S.
- Died: August 25, 2025 (aged 84) Mayville, North Dakota, U.S.
- Party: Democratic
- Spouse: Marilyn Aarsvold
- Children: 3
- Education: Mayville State University (BS); University of North Dakota (MS)
- Occupation: Politician, farmer, educator

Olav L. Aarsvold (November 6, 1940 – August 25, 2025) was an American politician, farmer and educator from Blanchard, North Dakota, who served in the North Dakota House of Representatives from 1989 to 2008, representing the 20th legislative district of North Dakota as a Democrat.

== Early life and education ==
Aarsvold was born in Mayville, North Dakota, on November 6, 1940. He graduated from Mayville State University in 1963 with a Bachelor of Science. In 1967, Aarsvold graduated from the University of North Dakota with a Master of Science.

== Career ==
Aarsvold served in the North Dakota House of Representatives from 1989 to 2008, representing the 20th legislative district of North Dakota as a Democrat. He was an unsuccessful candidate for re-election in 2008. Outside of the North Dakota Legislature, Aarsvold served as director of the Traill County Farmers Union, treasurer of the Blanchard Lutheran Church, and director of Red River Human Services.

Outside of politics, Aarsvold worked as a farmer and educator.

== Political positions ==
During his time in office, Aarsvold received a 100% rating from Gun Owners of America in 2000 and an A rating from the National Rifle Association of America in 2004.

In 2005, Aarsvold received 100% ratings from the North Dakota Farmers Union, Nodak Outdoors, and North Dakota AFL-CIO.

== Personal life and death ==
Aarsvold was married and has three children. He resided in Blanchard, North Dakota.

Aarsvold was a Lutheran. He died in Mayville, North Dakota on August 25, 2025, at the age of 84.

North Dakota House of Representatives
Preceded by —	Member of the North Dakota House of Representatives from the 20th district 1989—2008	Succeeded by —
