= 1976 NAIA Division II football season =

American college football season

- Regular season: August–November 1976
- Postseason: November–December 1976
- National Championship: Redlands, CA
- Champions: Westminster (PA) (2)

The 1976 NAIA Division II football season was the 21st season of college football sponsored by the NAIA and the seventh season of play of the NAIA's lower division for football.

The season was played from August to November 1976 and culminated in the 1976 NAIA Division II Football National Championship, played on the campus of the University of Redlands in Redlands, California.

The Westminster Titans defeated the Redlands Bulldogs in the championship game, 20–13, to win their second NAIA national title.

== Conference standings ==
1976 College Conference of Illinois and Wisconsin football standings
	Conf.					Overall
Team	W		L		T	W		L		T
Carroll (WI) $^	7	–	0	–	1	8	–	1	–	1
Augustana (IL) ^	6	–	2	–	0	7	–	3	–	0
No. 13 Illinois Wesleyan	5	–	3	–	0	6	–	3	–	0
Wheaton (IL)	5	–	3	–	0	6	–	3	–	0
North Central (IL)	4	–	3	–	1	5	–	3	–	1
Millikin	4	–	4	–	0	4	–	5	–	0
Carthage	3	–	5	–	0	3	–	6	–	0
Elmhurst	1	–	7	–	0	2	–	7	–	0
North Park	0	–	8	–	0	1	–	8	–	0
$ – Conference champion; ^ – NCAA Division III playoff participant

1976 Frontier Conference football standings
	Conf.					Overall
Team	W		L		T	W		L		T
No. 12 Carroll (MT) $	4	–	0	–	0	7	–	1	–	0
Western Montana	2	–	2	–	0	3	–	5	–	0
Rocky Mountain	2	–	2	–	0	2	–	6	–	0
Eastern Montana	1	–	3	–	0	3	–	6	–	0
Montana Tech	1	–	3	–	0	1	–	8	–	0
$ – Conference champion; Rankings from NAIA Division II poll

1976 Great Lakes Intercollegiate Athletic Conference football standings
	Conf.					Overall
Team	W		L		T	W		L		T
No. 15 Northwood $	4	–	1	–	0	5	–	2	–	1
No. 7 Grand Valley State	3	–	2	–	0	8	–	2	–	0
Wayne State (MI)	3	–	2	–	0	6	–	2	–	0
Ferris State	3	–	2	–	0	5	–	5	–	0
Hillsdale	2	–	3	–	0	5	–	5	–	0
Saginaw Valley State	0	–	5	–	0	3	–	7	–	0
$ – Conference champion; Rankings from NAIA Division II poll

1976 Heart of America Athletic Conference football standings
	Conf.					Overall
Team	W		L		T	W		L		T
No. 6 Missouri Valley $	5	–	0	–	1	8	–	1	–	1
No. 17 Graceland	4	–	2	–	0	6	–	3	–	0
Ottawa	3	–	3	–	0	5	–	4	–	0
William Jewell	3	–	3	–	0	3	–	6	–	0
Central Methodist	3	–	3	–	0	3	–	7	–	0
Tarkio	2	–	4	–	0	5	–	5	–	0
Baker	0	–	5	–	1	2	–	7	–	1
$ – Conference champion; Rankings from NAIA Division II poll

1976 Hoosier–Buckeye Conference football standings
	Conf.					Overall
Team	W		L		T	W		L		T
Defiance +	6	–	2	–	0	6	–	3	–	0
Findlay +	6	–	2	–	0	6	–	3	–	0
Hanover +	6	–	2	–	0	6	–	3	–	0
Wilmington (OH)	5	–	2	–	1	5	–	3	–	1
Taylor	4	–	4	–	0	5	–	4	–	0
Manchester (IN)	4	–	4	–	0	4	–	5	–	0
Anderson (IN)	3	–	5	–	0	3	–	6	–	0
Bluffton	1	–	7	–	0	1	–	8	–	0
Earlham	0	–	7	–	1	1	–	7	–	1
+ – Conference co-champions

1976 Illini–Badger Football Conference standings
	Conf.					Overall
Team	W		L		T	W		L		T
No. 14 Milton $	4	–	0	–	0	7	–	2	–	0
Eureka	3	–	1	–	0	6	–	3	–	0
Northeastern Illinois	2	–	2	–	0	3	–	6	–	0
Concordia (IL)	1	–	3	–	0	2	–	6	–	1
Lakeland	0	–	4	–	0	1	–	9	–	0
$ – Conference champion; Rankings from NAIA Division II poll

1976 Kansas Collegiate Athletic Conference football standings
	Conf.					Overall
Team	W		L		T	W		L		T
No. 8 Friends $	8	–	0	–	0	8	–	1	–	0
Sterling	6	–	2	–	0	6	–	3	–	0
Bethany (KS)	5	–	3	–	0	6	–	4	–	0
Bethel (KS)	5	–	3	–	0	5	–	4	–	0
McPherson	4	–	4	–	0	4	–	5	–	0
Southwestern (KS)	3	–	5	–	0	3	–	6	–	0
St. Mary of the Plains	3	–	5	–	0	3	–	6	–	0
Kansas Wesleyan	2	–	6	–	0	3	–	7	–	0
Tabor	0	–	8	–	0	0	–	9	–	0
$ – Conference champion; Rankings from NAIA Division II poll

1976 Minnesota Intercollegiate Athletic Conference football standings
	Conf.					Overall
Team	W		L		T	W		L		T
Saint John's (MN) $^	7	–	0	–	0	10	–	0	–	1
St. Olaf	5	–	2	–	0	7	–	3	–	0
St. Thomas (MN)	5	–	2	–	0	7	–	3	–	0
Concordia–Moorhead	5	–	2	–	0	6	–	3	–	0
Gustavus Adolphus	3	–	4	–	0	5	–	5	–	0
Hamline	2	–	5	–	0	4	–	5	–	0
Augsburg	1	–	6	–	0	1	–	8	–	0
Macalester	0	–	7	–	0	0	–	8	–	0
$ – Conference champion; ^ – NCAA Division III playoff participant; St. Thomas (MN) received a non-conference forfeit win from St. Cloud State.

1976 Nebraska Intercollegiate Athletic Conference football standings
	Conf.					Overall
Team	W		L		T	W		L		T
Midland +	4	–	1	–	0	8	–	2	–	0
Hastings +	4	–	1	–	0	7	–	3	–	0
Nebraska Wesleyan +	4	–	1	–	0	6	–	3	–	0
Doane	2	–	3	–	0	5	–	5	–	0
Dana	1	–	4	–	0	3	–	5	–	0
Concordia (NE)	0	–	5	–	0	1	–	9	–	0
+ – Conference co-champions

1976 North Dakota College Athletic Conference football standings
	Conf.					Overall
Team	W		L		T	W		L		T
No. 5 Valley City State $^	6	–	0	–	0	8	–	2	–	0
Minot State	5	–	1	–	0	6	–	3	–	0
Jamestown	4	–	2	–	0	6	–	3	–	0
Mayville State	3	–	3	–	0	3	–	5	–	0
Dickinson State	2	–	4	–	0	4	–	4	–	1
Wahpeton Science	1	–	5	–	0	4	–	5	–	0
Bismarck JC	0	–	6	–	0	1	–	7	–	0
$ – Conference champion; ^ – NAIA Division II playoff participant; Rankings from NAIA Division II poll

1976 Northwest Conference football standings
	Conf.					Overall
Team	W		L		T	W		L		T
Linfield $	6	–	1	–	0	7	–	3	–	0
Lewis & Clark	5	–	2	–	0	7	–	2	–	0
Pacific Lutheran	6	–	2	–	0	6	–	3	–	0
Willamette	4	–	2	–	1	4	–	4	–	1
Whitworth	4	–	3	–	0	6	–	3	–	0
Pacific (OR)	2	–	5	–	0	2	–	7	–	0
Whitman	1	–	6	–	0	3	–	6	–	0
College of Idaho	0	–	6	–	1	1	–	7	–	1
$ – Conference champion

1976 South Dakota Intercollegiate Conference football standings
	Conf.					Overall
Team	W		L		T	W		L		T
No. 9 Dakota State +	4	–	1	–	0	8	–	2	–	0
No. 10 Dakota Wesleyan +	4	–	1	–	0	8	–	2	–	0
Black Hills State	3	–	2	–	0	5	–	5	–	0
South Dakota Tech	2	–	3	–	0	4	–	4	–	1
Huron	1	–	3	–	1	4	–	5	–	1
South Dakota–Springfield	0	–	4	–	1	1	–	7	–	1
+ – Conference co-champions; Rankings from NAIA Division II poll

1976 Southern California Intercollegiate Athletic Conference football standings
	Conf.					Overall
Team	W		L		T	W		L		T
No. 2 Redlands $^	5	–	0	–	0	10	–	2	–	0
Occidental	3	–	2	–	0	5	–	3	–	0
La Verne	3	–	2	–	0	5	–	4	–	0
Whittier	2	–	3	–	0	6	–	4	–	0
Claremont-Mudd	2	–	3	–	0	2	–	6	–	0
Pomona-Pitzer	0	–	5	–	0	2	–	7	–	0
$ – Conference champion; ^ – NAIA Division II playoff participant; Rankings from NAIA Division II poll

1976 Texas Intercollegiate Athletic Association football standings
	Conf.					Overall
Team	W		L		T	W		L		T
Trinity (TX) $	4	–	0	–	0	6	–	5	–	0
Sul Ross	3	–	1	–	0	7	–	2	–	0
McMurry	1	–	3	–	0	3	–	8	–	0
Tarleton State	1	–	3	–	0	2	–	7	–	0
Austin	0	–	4	–	0	3	–	7	–	0
$ – Conference champion

1976 Tri-State Conference football standings
	Conf.					Overall
Team	W		L		T	W		L		T
Northwestern (IA) $	4	–	0	–	0	5	–	5	–	0
Bethel (MN)	3	–	1	–	0	7	–	2	–	0
Yankton	2	–	2	–	0	0	–	6	–	4
Sioux Falls	1	–	3	–	0	1	–	8	–	0
Westmar	0	–	4	–	0	0	–	9	–	0
$ – Conference champion

1976 West Virginia Intercollegiate Athletic Conference football standings
	Conf.					Overall
Team	W		L		T	W		L		T
Northern Division
No. 5 Shepherd xy	4	–	0	–	0	10	–	2	–	0
No. 11 Salem	3	–	1	–	0	8	–	1	–	1
West Liberty State	2	–	2	–	0	5	–	5	–	0
Fairmont State	1	–	3	–	0	4	–	6	–	0
West Virginia Wesleyan	0	–	4	–	0	2	–	8	–	0
Southern Division
No. T–19 Concord xy$	4	–	0	–	0	8	–	3	–	0
West Virginia State	2	–	2	–	0	4	–	4	–	1
Bluefield State	2	–	2	–	0	4	–	6	–	0
West Virginia Tech	1	–	3	–	0	2	–	7	–	0
Glenville State	1	–	3	–	0	3	–	7	–	0
Championship: Concord 21, Shepherd 7
$ – Conference champion; Conference standings based on power ratings; Rankings from NAIA Division I poll for Salem and Shepherd and NAIA Division II poll for Concord

1976 NAIA Division II independents football records
	Conf.			Overall
Team	W	L	T	W		L		T
No. 3 Texas Lutheran ^		–		10	–	1	–	0
No. 1 Westminster (PA) ^		–		10	–	1	–	0
No. 4 Cal Lutheran		–		9	–	1	–	0
No. 11 Georgetown (KY)		–		7	–	2	–	1
Franklin (IN)		–		6	–	3	–	0
No. 18 Waynesburg		–		6	–	3	–	0
No. T–19 Benedictine (KS)		–		7	–	4	–	0
Simon Fraser		–		5	–	5	–	0
Azusa Pacific		–		4	–	5	–	0
Iowa Wesleyan		–		2	–	7	–	0
Oklahoma Panhandle State		–		2	–	8	–	0
Geneva		–		1	–	8	–	0
^ – NAIA Division II playoff participant; Rankings from NAIA Division II poll

== Postseason ==
Semifinals; Campus sites
Westminster (PA)	31
Texas Lutheran*	0
Valley City State	39
Redlands* (OT)	40

Championship; Redlands, CA
Westminster (PA)	20
Redlands*	13

== See also ==
- 1976 NAIA Division I football season
- 1976 NCAA Division I football season
- 1976 NCAA Division II football season
- 1976 NCAA Division III football season
