= Emil R. Bedard =

United States Marine Corps general

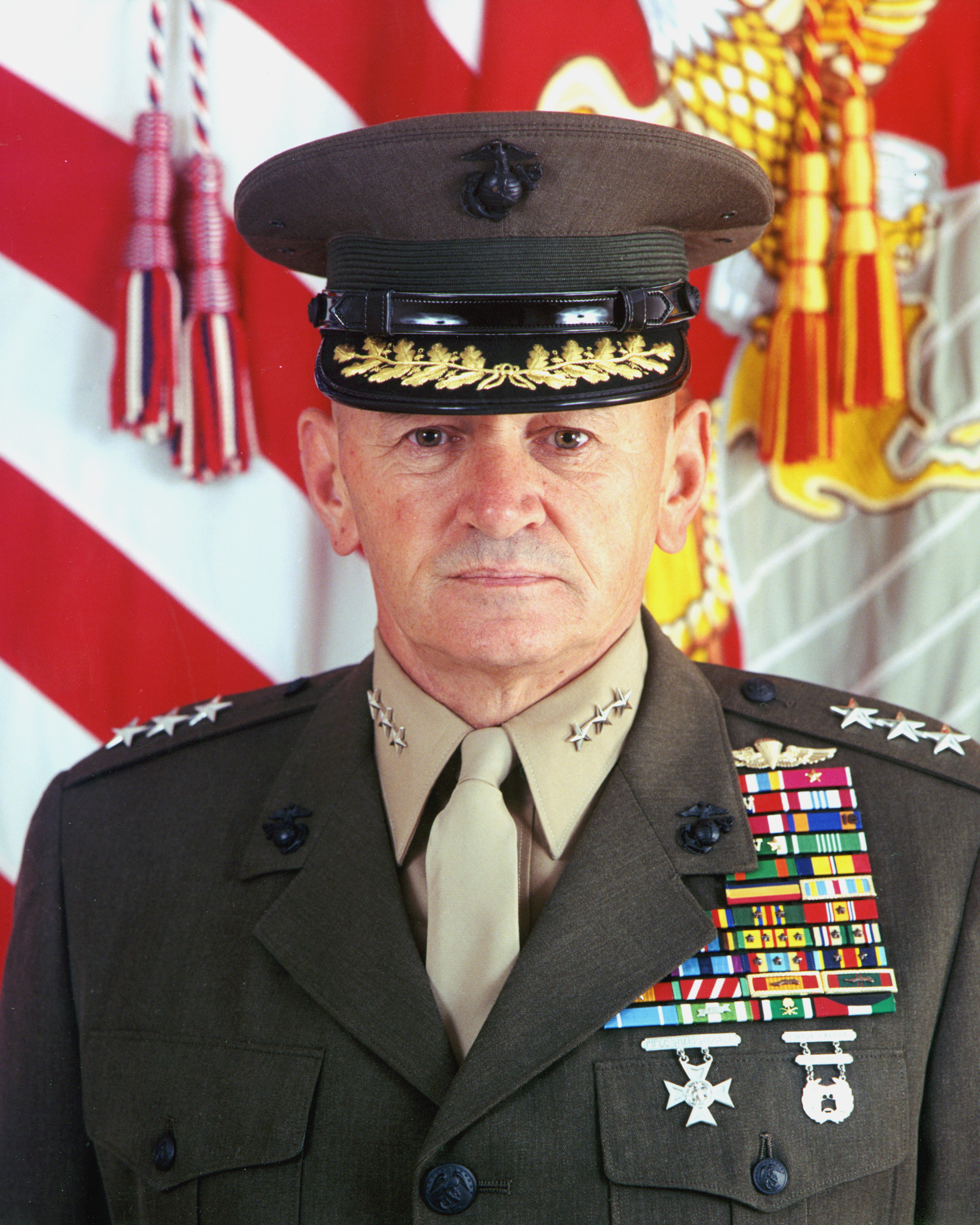
- Born: 3 December 1943 (age 82); Argyle, Minnesota U.S.
- Military career
- Allegiance: United States
- Branch: United States Marine Corps
- Service years: 1967–2003
- Rank: Lieutenant general
- Nickname: Buck

Emil R. Bedard (born 3 December 1943) is a retired lieutenant general in the United States Marine Corps who served as Deputy Commandant for Plans, Policies and Operations. He attended Mayville State University and the University of North Dakota and was commissioned in 1967.
