= Redlands Bulldogs football =

- First season: 1910
- Head coach: Jim Good; 5th season, 26–24 (.520)
- Location: Redlands, California
- Stadium: Ted Runner Stadium (capacity: 6,750)
- NCAA division: Division III
- Conference: SCIAC
- Colors: Maroon, grey, and black
- Website: goredlands.com

The Redlands Bulldogs football team represents the University of Redlands, located in Redlands, California, in NCAA Division III college football.

The Bulldogs, who began playing football in 1910, compete as members of the Southern California Intercollegiate Athletic Conference.

Redlands' home games are played at Ted Runner Stadium.

== Postseason appearances ==
=== NAIA Division II playoffs ===
The Bulldogs have made one appearance in the NAIA Division II playoffs, with a combined record of 1–1.

Year	Round	Opponent	Result
1976	Semifinals; National Championship	Valley City State; Westminster (PA)	W, 40–39 ^{OT} L, 13–20

=== NCAA Division III playoffs ===
The Bulldogs have made ten appearances in the NCAA Division III playoffs, with a combined record of 0–10.

Year	Round	Opponent	Result
1990	First Round	Central (IA)	L, 14–24
1992	First Round	Wisconsin–La Crosse	L, 26–47
2002	First Round	Saint John's (MN)	L, 24–31
2003	First Round	Linfield	L, 23–31
2007	First Round	Saint John's (MN)	L, 13–41
2011	First Round	Mary Hardin–Baylor	L, 13–34
2013	First Round	Mary Hardin–Baylor	L, 7–35
2016	First Round	Mary Hardin–Baylor	L, 28–50
2019	First Round	Mary Hardin–Baylor	L, 14–43
2021	First Round	Linfield	L, 10–44
