= North Dakota College Athletic Conference =

The North Dakota College Athletic Conference (NDCAC) was a college athletic conference that operated from 1931 to 2000 with member schools located in the states of Minnesota and North Dakota. The conference formed in November 1931, as the North Dakota Intercollegiate Athletic Conference (NDIAC), after the dissolution of the Interstate Athletic Conference. Later known as North Dakota Intercollegiate Conference (NDIC), the conference ceased operations following the 1999–00 academic school year when it merged with the South Dakota Intercollegiate Conference (SDIC) to form the Dakota Athletic Conference (DAC).

== Members ==
- The following is a list of historic members:

Institution	Nickname	Location	First year	Last year	Current conference
Jamestown College	Jimmies	Jamestown, North Dakota	1931	2000	Northern Sun Intercollegiate Conference
Mayville State University	Comets	Mayville, North Dakota	1931	2000	Frontier Conference
North Dakota State College of Science	Wildcats	Wahpeton, North Dakota	1931	1989	Mon-Dak Conference
North Dakota State Normal and Industrial School	Dusties	Ellendale, North Dakota	1931	1969	Closed 1971
Valley City State University	Vikings	Valley City, North Dakota	1931	2000	Frontier Conference
Dickinson State University	Blue Hawks	Dickinson, North Dakota	1931	2000	Frontier Conference
Minot State University	Beavers	Minot, North Dakota	1931	2000	Northern Sun Intercollegiate Conference
North Dakota School of Forestry	Lumberjacks	Bottineau, North Dakota	1931	1958	Mon-Dak Conference
Bismarck Junior College	Mystics	Bismarck, North Dakota	1948	1985	Frontier Conference
University of Mary	Marauders	Bismarck, North Dakota	1988	2000	Northern Sun Intercollegiate Conference
University of Minnesota, Crookston	Golden Eagles	Crookston, Minnesota	1995	1999	Northern Sun Intercollegiate Conference

== Football champions ==
- 1932 – Ellendale and Minot State
- 1933 – Jamestown
- 1934 – Jamestown
- 1935 – Jamestown
- 1936 – Wahpeton
- 1937 – Wahpeton
- 1938 – Wahpeton
- 1939 – Wahpeton
- 1940 – Mayville State
- 1941 – Jamestown
- 1942 – Wahpeton
- 1943 – No champion
- 1944 – No champion
- 1945 – No champion
- 1946 – Minot State
- 1947 – Valley City State
- 1948 – Minot State and Wahpeton Science
- 1949 – Valley City State
- 1950 – Valley City State
- 1951 – Dickinson State and Valley City State
- 1952 – Jamestown, Minot State, and Valley City State
- 1953 – Valley City State
- 1954 – Minot State and Valley City State
- 1955 – Dickinson State and Jamestown
- 1956 – Jamestown
- 1957 – Jamestown
- 1958 – Dickinson State and Valley City State
- 1959 – Mayville State
- 1960 – Dickinson State and Mayville State
- 1961 – Mayville State
- 1962 – Minot State and Wahpeton Science
- 1963 – Valley City State
- 1964 – Mayville State and Valley City State
- 1965 – Mayville State

- 1966 – Jamestown and Mayville State
- 1967 – Jamestown
- 1968 – Jamestown
- 1969 – Jamestown
- 1970 – Minot State
- 1971 – Jamestown, Minot State, and Wahpeton Science
- 1972 – Minot State and Valley City State
- 1973 – Minot State
- 1974 – Minot State
- 1975 – Dickinson State and Jamestown
- 1976 – Valley City State
- 1977 – Valley City State
- 1978 – Valley City State
- 1979 – Jamestown
- 1980 – Valley City State
- 1981 – Dickinson State
- 1982 – Dickinson State and Valley City State
- 1983 – Minot State and Valley City State
- 1984 – Jamestown and Valley City State
- 1985 – Minot State
- 1986 – Dickinson State
- 1987 – Dickinson State
- 1988 – Valley City State
- 1989 – Dickinson State
- 1990 – Dickinson State and Mayville State
- 1991 – Dickinson State and Minot State
- 1992 – Dickinson State, Mary, and Minot State
- 1993 – Minot State
- 1994 – Dickinson State and Minot State
- 1995 – Dickinson State
- 1996 – Mary and Valley City State
- 1997 – Jamestown
- 1998 – Minot State
- 1999 – Mary

== See also ==
- List of defunct college football conferences
