= Bismarck State College =

Public college in Bismarck, North Dakota, U.S.

Coordinates: 46°49′19″N 100°49′04″W

- Type: Public college
- Established: 1939; 87 years ago
- Parent institution: North Dakota University System
- Academic affiliations: Space-grant
- President: Brian Kalk
- Students: 4,773
- Location: Bismarck, North Dakota, United States
- Campus: 120 acres (49 ha); Urban
- Colors: Green, Silver, Black, White
- Nickname: Mystics
- Sporting affiliations: Frontier Conference, NAIA, NIRA
- Website: bismarckstate.edu
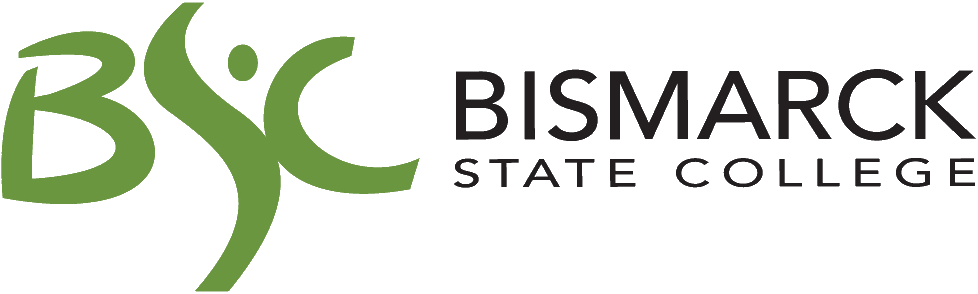

Bismarck State College (BSC) is a public college in Bismarck, North Dakota, United States. It is the third largest college in the North Dakota University System with 4,206 students enrolled for the 2024-2025 academic year. Established in 1939, it is a comprehensive community college that offers the first two years of education toward a bachelor's degree in most fields as well as 14+ bachelor's degrees and several undergraduate programs in conjunction with other university system institutions. In 2020, Bismarck State College became the first polytechnic college in North Dakota. Approximately 35 technical programs are offered and more than 150 courses are offered online. Unique to the institution are degrees in energy, including power and process plant technology, nuclear power technology, electric power technology, and renewable energy.

== Student life ==
Undergraduate demographics as of Fall 2023
Race and ethnicity	Total
White	81%
Hispanic	6%
Two or more races	5%
Black	3%
American Indian/Alaska Native	2%
Asian	1%
International student	1%
Unknown	1%
Economic diversity
Low-income (Note: The percentage of students who received an income-based federal Pell grant intended for low-income students.)	21%
Affluent (Note: The percentage of students who are a part of the American middle class at the bare minimum.)	79%

Student activities are managed by the staff of the Student and Residence Life Office, located in the Student Union building on campus. Students can register for meal plans, request housing, visit the bookstore, sign up for intramurals or student government, and learn about the activities provided for them on and off campus. Dances, hypnotists, comedians, artists, barbecues, and tie-dye are popular events.

== Athletics ==
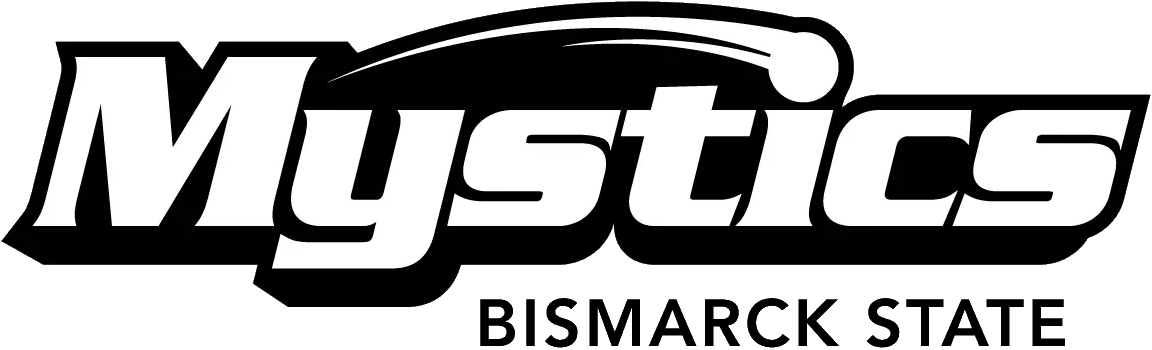
Bismarck State athletics wordmark

The Bismarck State athletic teams are called the Mystics. The college is a member of the National Association of Intercollegiate Athletics (NAIA), primarily competing in the Frontier Conference for most of its sports since the 2025–26 academic year. They are also members of the National Intercollegiate Rodeo Association (NIRA) for men's and women's rodeo. The Mystics previously competed in the Mon-Dak Conference (MDC) of the National Junior College Athletic Association (NJCAA) for most of its sports since 1963.

Bismarck State competes in 17 intercollegiate varsity sports. Men's sports include baseball, basketball, cross country, rodeo, track & field and wrestling; women's sports include basketball, cross country, softball, rodeo, track & field, volleyball and wrestling; and co-ed sports include clay dusters and eSports. Men's football will return in 2027 after a decades-long hiatus.

Bismarck State College is currently transitioning into a four-year institution and will be leaving the Mon-Dak Conference after the 2024–25 academic year. They will become members of the National Association of Intercollegiate Athletics (NAIA) and has applied to join the Frontier Conference beginning in the 2025–26 academic year.

On November 6, 2025, Bismarck State announced that the school would be reviving its football team, which was discontinued in 1985. The team will begin play in the Frontier Conference in the 2027–28 athletic season.

== Notable alumni ==
- David Andahl, businessman and politician
- Alvin Jaeger, 14th Secretary of State of North Dakota
- Brock Lesnar, former WWE Champion and former UFC Heavyweight Champion
- Bob Stenehjem, Republican member and Majority Leader of the North Dakota Senate
- Masai Ujiri, general manager of the NBA's Toronto Raptors
- Larry Watson, author of novels, poetry, and short stories

== Notable faculty ==
- Ed Kringstad – wrestling coach, North Dakota State Senator
