= Valley City State University =

Public university in Valley City, North Dakota, U.S.

Coordinates: 46°55′08″N 98°00′10″W

- Former names: Valley City State Normal School (1890–1921); Valley City State Teachers College (1921–1963); Valley City State College (1963–1986); State University of North Dakota at Valley City (1986–1987)
- Type: Public university
- Established: 1890; 136 years ago
- Parent institution: North Dakota University System
- Academic affiliations: Space-grant
- President: Allen Burgad
- Students: 1,871 (Fall 2026)
- Undergraduates: 1,723 (Fall 2026)
- Postgraduates: 148 (Fall 2026)
- Location: Valley City, North Dakota, North, U.S.
- Colors: Cardinal Red & Blue
- Nickname: Vikings
- Sporting affiliations: NAIA – Frontier
- Website: www.vcsu.edu

Valley City State University (VCSU) is a public university in Valley City, North Dakota, United States. It is part of the North Dakota University System. Founded in 1890 as Valley City State Normal School, a two-year teachers' college, it was authorized to confer bachelor's degrees in 1921 and changed its name to Valley City State Teachers College. With an expansion in programs outside teacher education after World War II, it became Valley City State College in 1963. In 1986, it was renamed State University of North Dakota-Valley City and a year later received its current name.

VCSU offers more than 65 undergraduate programs and multiple online graduate programs including a Master of Education, Master of Arts in Teaching and Master of Science in Business Information Systems degrees. In 2015, VCSU graduated 302 students, the largest class in its 125-year history.

VCSU is listed as a Historic District on the National Register of Historic Places.

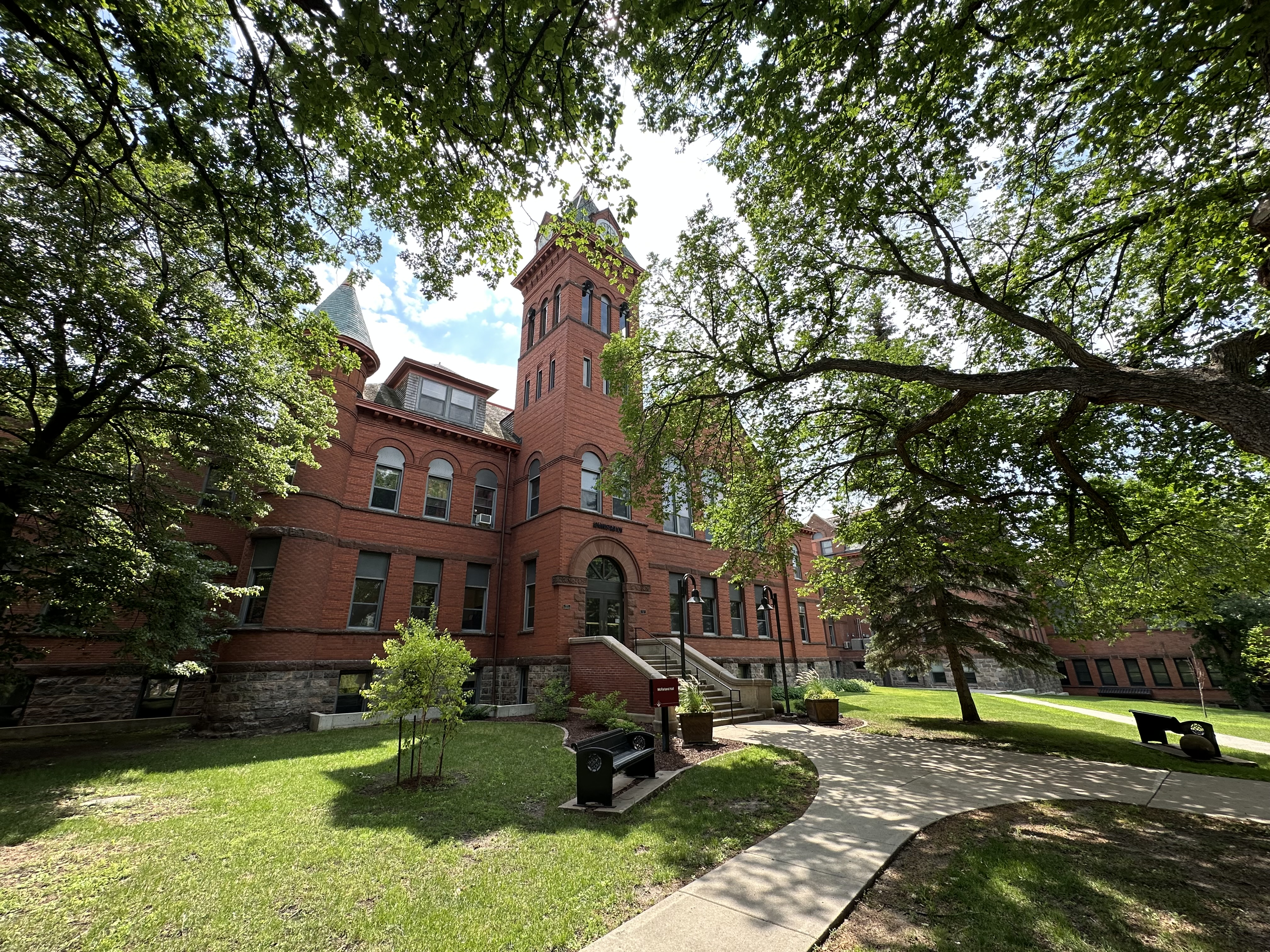
McFarland Hall

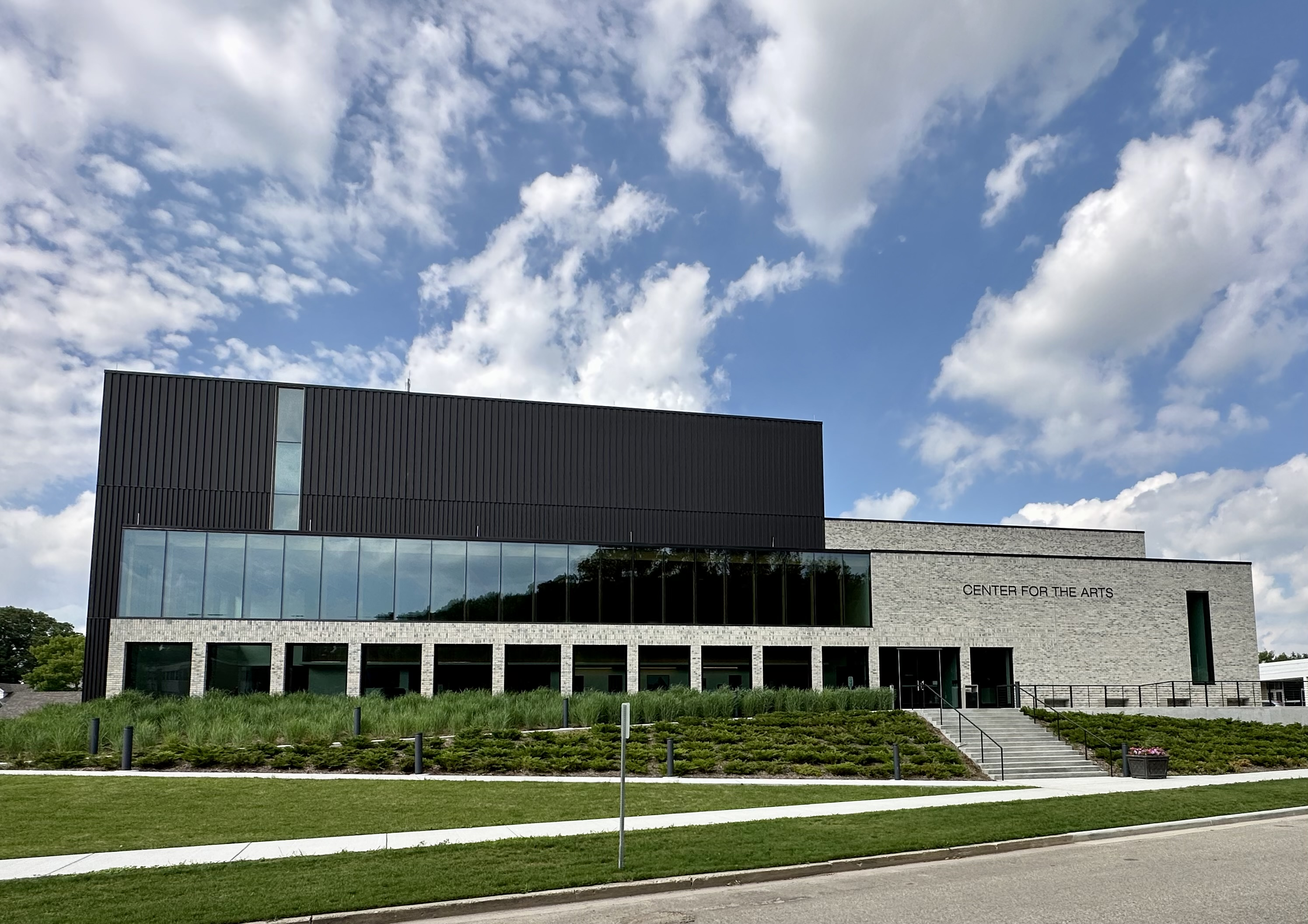
Center for the Fine Arts

== Campus ==
The campus of Valley City State comprises 55 acres in Valley City, ND. The campus borders a forested hillside to the south and the Sheyenne River to the north. It has been listed as the most beautiful campus in North Dakota.

There are several notable buildings on campus:

- McFarland Hall was built in 1892 for $26, 220. It was built of red brick and included the library, assembly room, cloakroom and educational spaces. The building also had space for a training school that housed kindergarten students through high school. This gave students attending Valley City Normal School the opportunity to student teach without leaving campus. This was one of the first schools in the region to offer practice teaching for future teachers.
- The Rhoades Science Center was renovated in 2013 and includes North Dakota's only planetarium.
- Vangstad Auditorium was built in 1902 for $40,000. There are several unique parts of this building including the auditorium that has a dome ceiling, stained glass windows, statues and an organ. The building was renamed in 1971 to honor Lena and Thilda Vangstad, long-time faculty at VCSU. It was renovated in 2016 to create space for business offices and classrooms.
- Center for the Fine Arts was opened in 2022 and cost $32 million to build. The Music and Art departments are housed in the building and the space includes various labs and a performance hall.
- The W. E. Osmon Building for Physical Education was named on October 15, 1983 and is also known as "The Bubble." This building houses the basketball and other athletic programs on campus. Bill Osmon graduated from VCSU in 1942 and served as athletic director at the school from 1947 to 1982.

=== Footbridge ===
There is a footbridge that spans the Sheyenne River that leads to the front door of the university. The bridge connects campus with the city of Valley City. Originally, the bridge was built out of wood in 1892 to connect the Normal School with town. In 1901, a suspension bridge was built and cost $1,940. In 1992, a teenager attempted to drive a car across the bridge and damaged the decking, beams, cable anchors and railing. The bridge was restored and reinforced and brick planters now sit at both entrances to prevent a similar situation.

== Presidents ==
VCSU has had 15 different presidents since its founding:

1. James W. Sifton (1890–1892)
2. George A. McFarland (1892–1918) — During McFarland's tenure, the school grew from 35 students to 1,343 students.
3. Carlos Eben Allen (1918–1936)
4. Joachim Frederick Weltzin III (1936–1938)
5. James Emery Cox (1938–1942)
6. Eugene Henry Kleinpell (1942–1946)
7. Roscoe Leonard Lokken (1946–1970)
8. Howard Coburn Rose (1970–1974)
9. Ted DeVries (1974–1982)
10. Charles B. House (1982–1993)
11. Ellen-Earle Chaffee (1993–2008) — During Dr. Chaffee's tenure, VCSU became one of the first "laptop universities" in the United states by offering laptops to every faculty and student.
12. Steven W. Shirley (2008–2014)
13. Tisa Mason (2014–2017)
14. Margaret Dahlberg (Interim President July 2014 – December 2014, December 2017 – December 2018)
15. Alan D. LaFave (2018–2025)
16. Allen Burgad (Interim President January 2026–present)

== Athletics ==
The Valley City State athletic teams are called the Vikings. The university is a member of the National Association of Intercollegiate Athletics (NAIA), primarily competing as a member of the North Star Athletic Association (NSAA) as a founding member since the 2013–14 academic year. Valley City State University athletic teams began play in the Frontier Conference for the 2025–26 academic year. The Vikings previously competed as an NAIA Independent within the Association of Independent Institutions (AII) from 2011–12 to 2012–13; and in these defunct conferences: the Dakota Athletic Conference (DAC) from 2000–01 to 2010–11; and the North Dakota College Athletic Conference (NDCAC) from 1922–23 to 1999–2000.

Valley City State competes in 12 intercollegiate varsity sports: Men's sports include baseball, basketball, cross country, football, golf and track & field; while women's sports include basketball, cross country, golf, softball, track & field and volleyball.

== Student life ==
Undergraduate demographics as of Fall 2023
Race and ethnicity	Total
White	80%
Hispanic	6%
Two or more races	6%
Black	3%
International student	2%
American Indian/Alaska Native	1%
Asian	1%
Native Hawaiian/Pacific Islander	1%
Unknown	1%
Economic diversity
Low-income (Note: The percentage of students who received an income-based federal Pell grant intended for low-income students.)	29%
Affluent (Note: The percentage of students who are a part of the American middle class at the bare minimum.)	71%

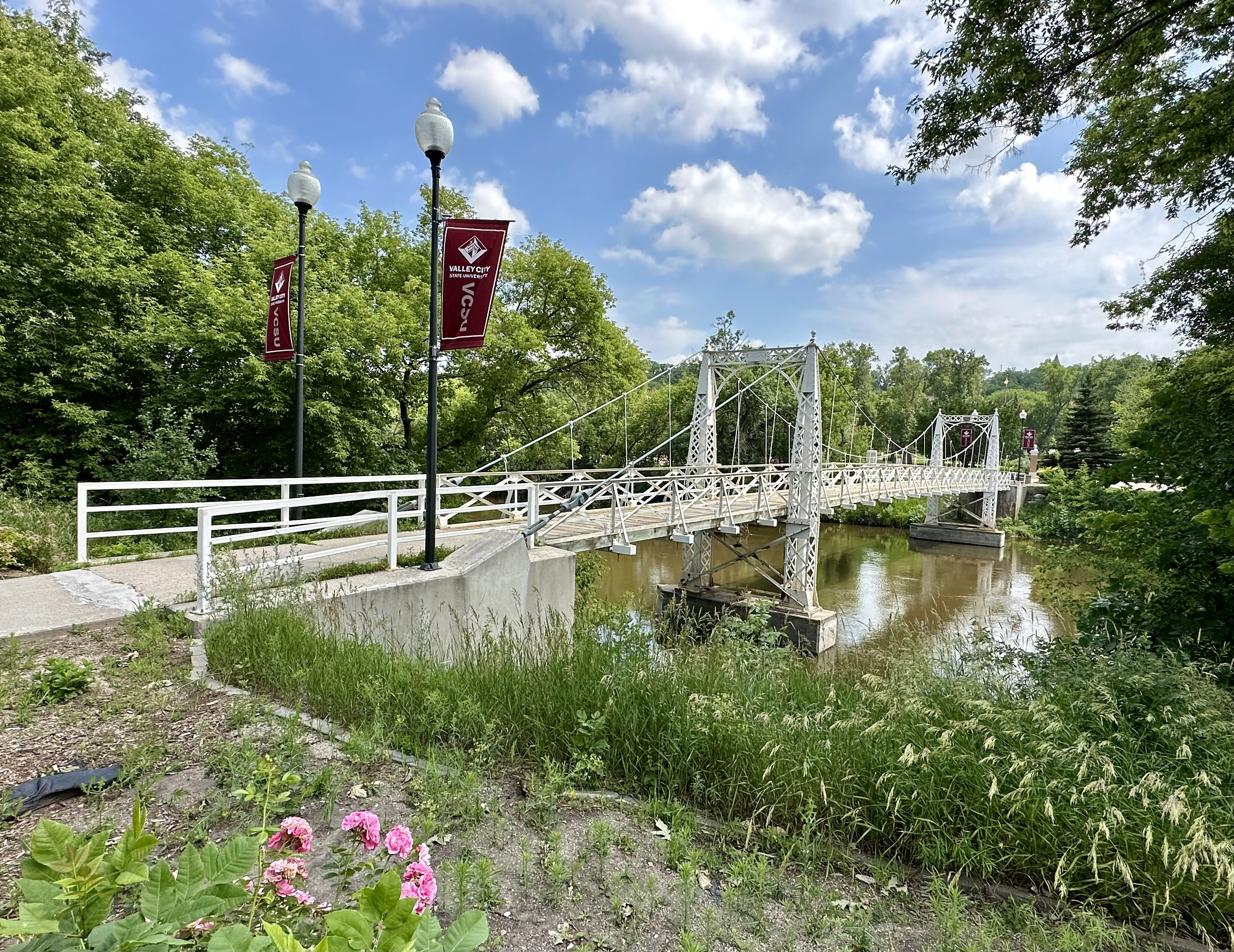
Valley City State University Footbridge

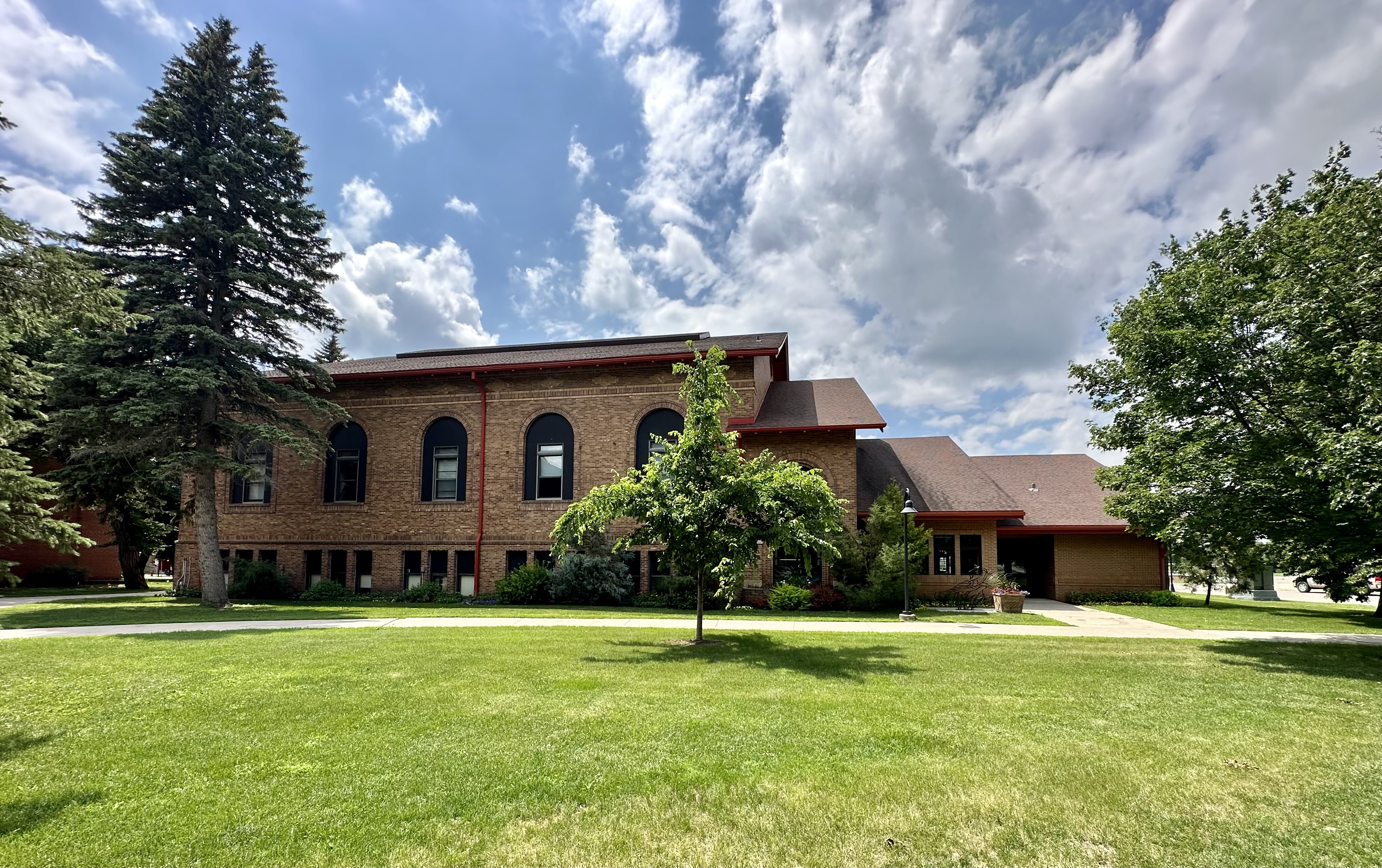
Valley City State University, Charlotte Graichen Gymnasium

== Notable alumni ==
- Paul Fjelde, sculptor and professor
- Todd Hoffner, head football coach at Minnesota State University, Mankato
- Thomas Kleppe (1919–2007), former U.S. Representative from North Dakota and U.S. Secretary of the Interior
- Carleton Opgaard, educator
- James D. Ployhar, composer and music educator
- Earl Pomeroy, U.S. Representative from North Dakota
- Gary Tharaldson, founder of the Tharaldson Companies
- Jason Perkins, basketball player
