= Mayville State University =

Public university in Mayville, North Dakota, US

Coordinates: 47°30′17″N 97°19′24″W

- Former names: Mayville Normal School (1889–1925); Mayville State Teacher's College (1925–1964); Mayville State College (1964–1965); State University of North Dakota at Mayville (1965–1987)
- Type: Public university
- Established: 1889; 137 years ago
- Academic affiliations: Space-grant
- President: Brian Van Horn
- Faculty: 84 (49 full time)
- Administrative staff: 115
- Students: 1,134
- Location: Mayville, North Dakota, U.S.
- Campus: Rural 301 acres (122 ha)
- Colors: Reflex Blue & White
- Nickname: Comets
- Sporting affiliations: NAIA – Frontier
- Website: mayvillestate.edu

Mayville State University (MSU or MaSU) is a public university in Mayville, North Dakota, United States. It is part of the North Dakota University System.

== History ==
Founded as a normal school by provision of the North Dakota Constitution in 1889, Mayville State was granted 30,000 acres (12,000 ha) and organized by the first Legislative Assembly.

Classes began in 1889, with funds for Old Main, a building the Second Legislative Assembly provided in 1891, where classes were initially held in 1894. In 1926, the State Board of Higher Education authorized Mayville State to grant a Bachelor of Arts in education. "Mayville Normal School" thus became "Mayville State Teacher's College", providing general education and offering a four-year degree. Successive additions strengthened the curriculum; as enrollment grew, new buildings appeared.

In 1948, the B.A. in education became a B.S. in education and the first non-teaching Bachelor of Arts was offered in 1961. In 1973 and 1982, "Mayville State College" established programs in business administration and computer studies. In the early 1980s, the Bachelor of Science and Bachelor of General Studies became available. The present name, Mayville State University, was approved by the legislature in 1987.

== Academics ==
Undergraduate demographics as of Fall 2023
Race and ethnicity	Total
White	73%
Two or more races	9%
Hispanic	7%
Black	6%
American Indian/Alaska Native	2%
International student	2%
Asian	1%
Unknown	1%
Economic diversity
Low-income (Note: The percentage of students who received an income-based federal Pell grant intended for low-income students.)	34%
Affluent (Note: The percentage of students who are a part of the American middle class at the bare minimum.)	66%

== Campus ==
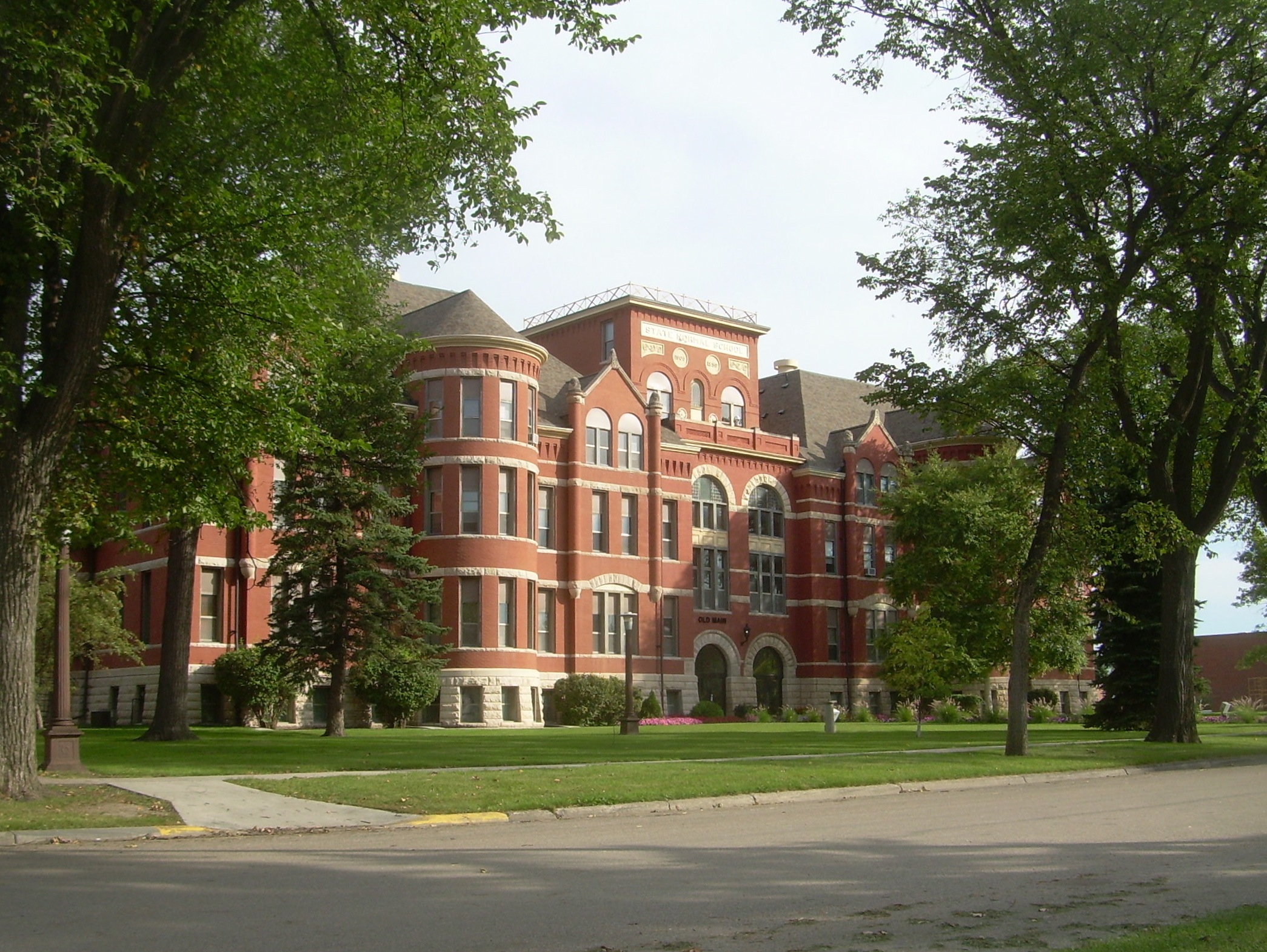
Old Main, a contributing building to the historic district

In 1985, multiple campus buildings were recognized by the National Register of Historic Places with the creation of the Mayville Historic District.

On April 9, 2010, the university broke ground on "the first state-funded building in more than 40 years." Agassiz Hall, the largest residence hall, was remodeled to provide suite- and apartment-style living accommodations for men and women. An addition to the science and library buildings became the new home of the Division of Education and Psychology.

== Athletics ==
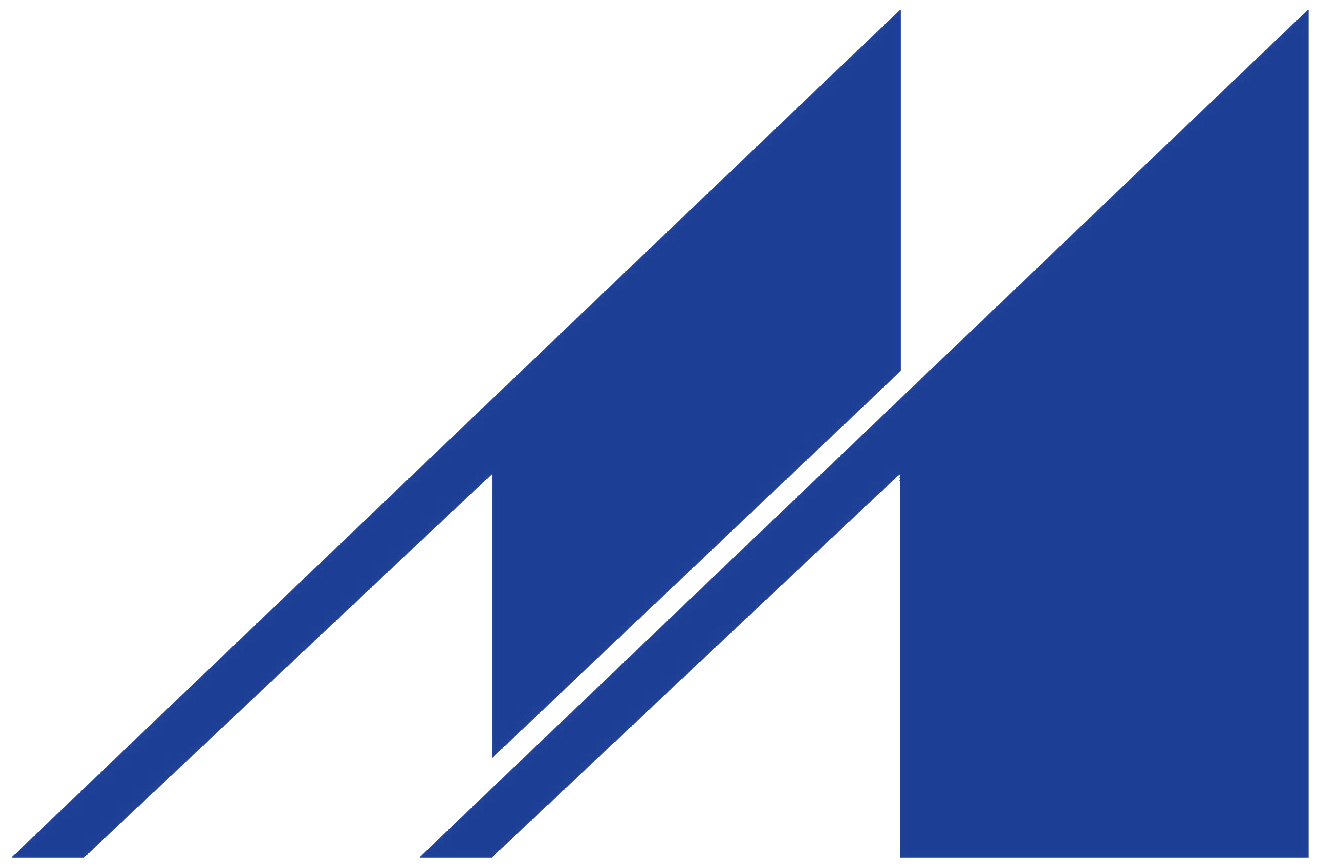
Mayville athletics monogram

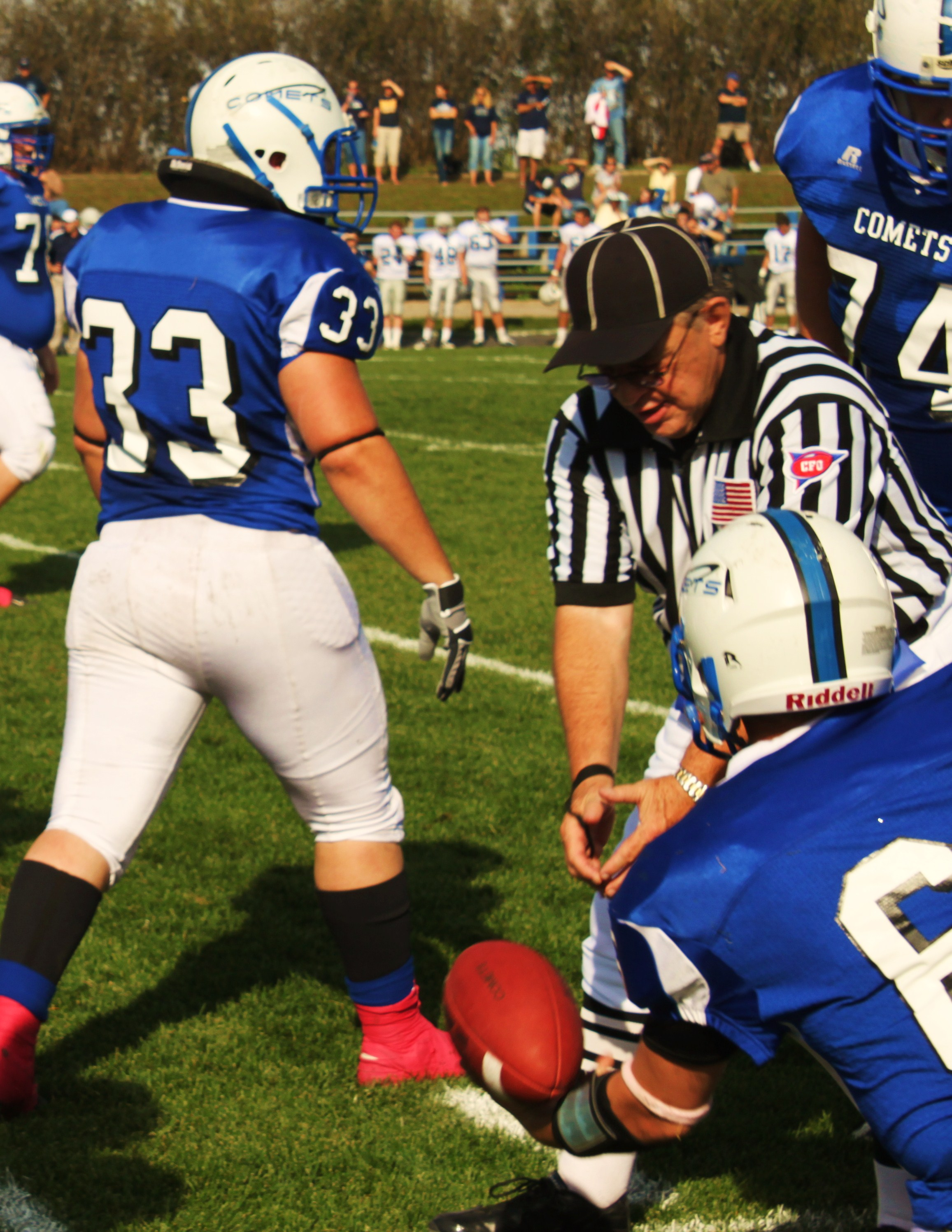
Mayville State football game in 2010

Mayville State's athletic teams are called the Comets. The university is a member of the National Association of Intercollegiate Athletics (NAIA), primarily competing as a member of the North Star Athletic Association (NSAA) as a founding member since the 2013–14 academic year. The Comets previously competed as an NAIA Independent within the Association of Independent Institutions (AII) from 2011–12 to 2012–13; and in these defunct conferences: the Dakota Athletic Conference (DAC) from 2000–01 to 2010–11; and the North Dakota College Athletic Conference (NDCAC) from 1922–23 to 1999–2000.

Mayville State competes in six intercollegiate varsity sports. Men's sports include baseball, basketball, and football; women's sports include basketball, softball, and volleyball.

The Mayville State Comets men's basketball team finished runner-up at the NAIA Division II Men's Basketball National Tournament in 2007. This is the only men's basketball team in North Dakota history to play in a national collegiate championship game.

Mayville State's softball team appeared in the 1976 Women's College World Series. Mayville State volleyball made a national tournament appearance in 2021. The program has had several All-American players.

== Notable alumni ==
- Ole Aarsvold - member of the North Dakota House of Representatives from the 20th district
- Nick Anderson - professional baseball player
- Emil R. Bedard - Lieutenant General in the United States Marine Corps
- Hank Biesiot - college football and baseball coach
- Merle Boucher - minority leader of the North Dakota House of Representatives from the 9th district
- Jim Dew - college football and baseball coach
- Lynn Frazier - United States Senator and 12th Governor of North Dakota
- Curt Kreun - member of the North Dakota Senate from the 42nd district
- David Moe - college basketball coach
- Roger Moe - majority leader of the Minnesota Senate
- Mitch Ostile - member of the North Dakota House of Representatives from the 12th district
- Gene Roebuck - college basketball coach
