= List of University of Wisconsin–Stout alumni =

The University of Wisconsin–Stout is a public university in Menomonie, Wisconsin. In the past, the university was known as the Stout Institute, Stout State College, and Stout State University. Following are some of its notable alumni.

== Art ==
Name	Class	Major	Notability	References
Leslie Barlow	2011	Studio arts	Visual artist	
Karen Heagle	1990	Fine arts and studio arts	Artist	
Alonzo C. Webb		Non-degreed	Etcher, architect, painter, and illustrator	
Eliza Wheeler	2006	Graphic design	Children's book illustrator	

== Business ==
Name	Class	Major	Notability	References
Cindy Pawlcyn	1977	Hotel, restaurant, and tourism management	Chef and cookbook author known for the restaurants in the San Francisco Bay Area	
Jill Soltau	1989	Retail merchandising and management	CEO of JCPenney and CEO of Jo-Ann Fabrics	
Todd R. Wanek	1988	Industrial Technology	President and CEO of Ashley Furniture Industries, Inc.	

== Education ==
Name	Class	Major	Notability	References
Adelaide Steele Baylor	1928	Sc.D.	Chief of the Home Economics Education Service in the United States Office of Education	
Harvey Schofield			President of the University of Wisconsin–Eau Claire and college football coach	

== Entertainment ==
Name	Class	Major	Notability	References
Gus Johnson	2018	Entertainment Design	YouTube personality and comedian	
Nettie McBirney		Home Economics	Writer of a cooking column under the pseudonym "Aunt Chick" for the Tulsa Daily World from 1935 to 1955	
Nancy Zieman	1975	Textile design and journalism	Host of the television show Sewing with Nancy	

== Military ==
Name	Class	Major	Notability	References
Hubert C. Hegtvedt	1987	Industrial technology and manufacturing engineering	United States Air Force major general	
Emil C. Kiel	1917		United States Air Force brigadier general	
Scott D. Legwold	1998	Human resources (master's)	United States National Guard brigadier general	

== Politics ==
Name	Class	Major	Notability	References
Vera C. Bushfield	1912	Domestic science	Former United States senator from South Dakota and First Lady of South Dakota	
Roy Carl Carlson	1968	Vocational education (master's)	Minnesota House of Representatives	
Alice Clausing	1970	Guidance and counseling (master's)	Former member of the Wisconsin State Senate	
Gary Drzewiecki	1973–1974	Non-degreed	Former member of the Wisconsin State Senate	
Robert J. Larson	1966	Guidance (master's)	Former Wisconsin State Assembly	
Terry Link			Member of the Illinois Senate	
Clint Moses	1999	Human biology	Member of the Wisconsin State Assembly	
Joe Plouff	1986	M.S.	Wisconsin State Assembly	
Ewald J. Schmeichel		Non-degreed	Former Wisconsin State Assembly	
Richard Shoemaker	1975	BS	Member of the Wisconsin State Assembly and the Wisconsin State Senate	
David Zien	1975	MS	Member of the Wisconsin Senate	

== Sports ==
Name	Class	Major	Notability	References
Parks Bailey			College football player and coach	
Tony Beckham	2002		Professional football player	
Paige Decker	2016		Professional stock car racing driver	
Oties Epps	2002, 2006	B.S. Human development and family studies; M.S.Education	Head coach of the women's basketball program at the University of Evansville	
Rikard Grönborg		Management leadership (master's)	Ice hockey coach	
Frank Haege	1992		College and professional football coach	
Jeff Hazuga	2013	Training and development (master's)	Former professional football player	
Reggie Holmes			Professional gridiron football player in Canada	
Gary Inskeep			Professional gridiron football player in Canada	
Barney Klecker			Former record holder for the fifty-mile ultramarathon	
Bob McRoberts			Former professional football player	
John Peterson	1971	Industrial education	Wrestler and Olympic gold medalist in freestyle wrestling	
Bob Raczek	1962	Master's	Hall-of-fame high school football coach	
Harvey Schofield			College football coach; president of the University of Wisconsin–Eau Claire	
Tony Storti		Non-degreed	Former head coach of the Montana State Bobcats football team	
Joe Vavra	1982	Industrial technology	Quality control coach for the Detroit Tigers	

== Other ==
Name	Class	Major	Notability	References
Luke Helder		Non-degreed	Domestic terrorist known as the Midwest pipe bomber	
