= Wisconsin–Stout Blue Devils =

- University: University of Wisconsin–Stout
- Conference: WIAC
- NCAA: Division III
- Location: Menomonie, Wisconsin
- Football stadium: Don and Nona Williams Stadium
- Basketball arena: Johnson Fieldhouse
- Ice hockey arena: Fanetti Community Center
- Baseball stadium: Nelson Field
- Mascot: Johnny Blaze
- Nickname: Blue Devils
- Fight song: UW-Stout Fight Song
- Colors: Navy and white
- Website: www.stoutbluedevils.com

The University of Wisconsin–Stout Blue Devils (casually known as the UW-Stout Blue Devils) are the athletic teams of the University of Wisconsin–Stout. The Blue Devil athletic teams have competed exclusively in NCAA Division III since 1992. Prior to that, they associated with both the NCAA and NAIA in various years, though they typically chose to participate in NAIA championship playoffs over NCAA playoffs. The Blue Devils are composed of 16 different varsity teams.

== Individual teams ==
Men's sports	Women's sports
Baseball	Basketball
Basketball	Cross country
Cross country	Golf
Football	Gymnastics
Golf	Soccer
Ice Hockey	Softball
Track & field^{1}	Tennis
	Track & field^{1}
	Volleyball
^{1} – includes both indoor and outdoor.

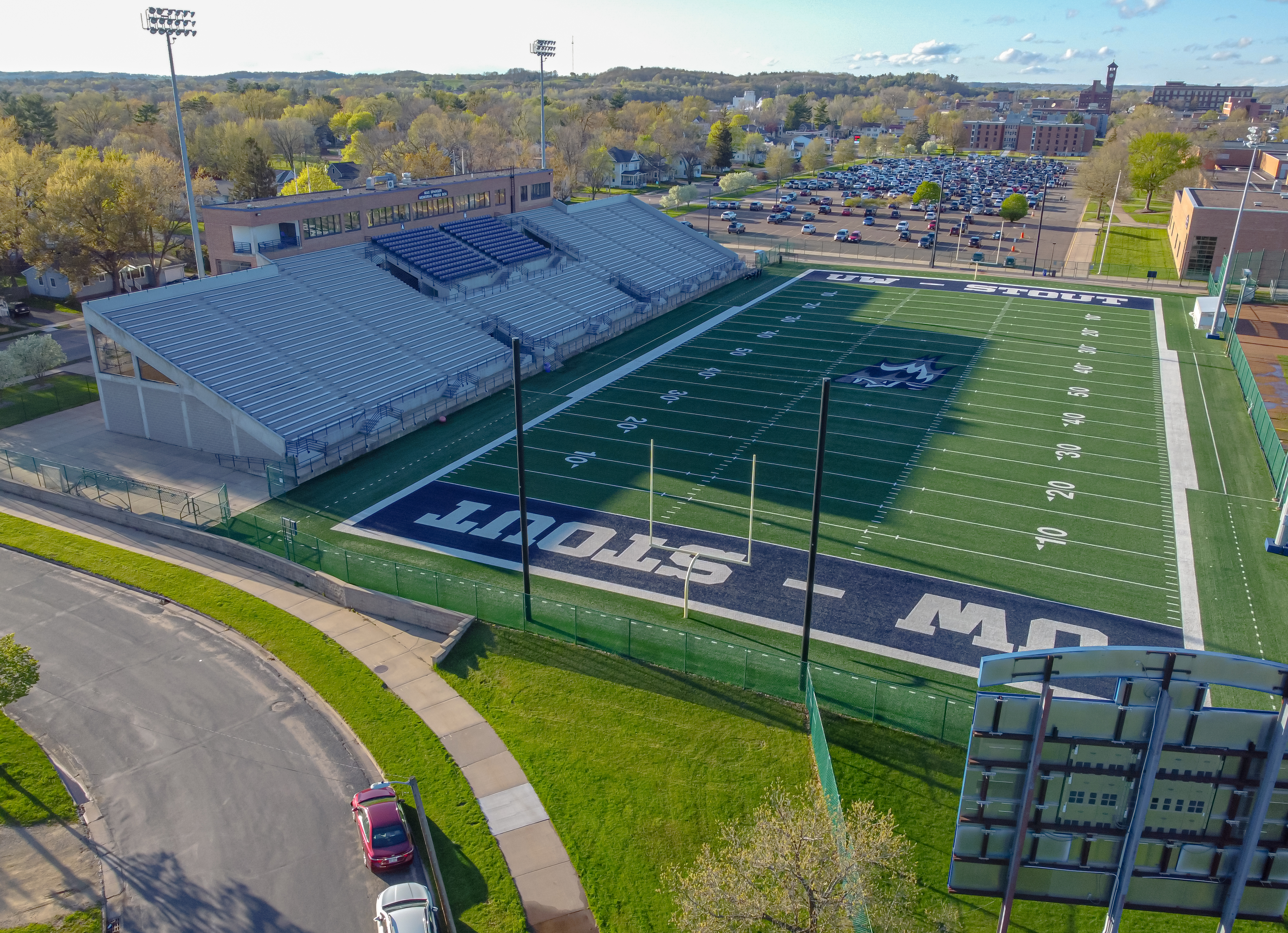
Don and Nona Williams Stadium, home of Blue Devil football.

=== Football ===
The Blue Devils compete at the Don and Nona Williams Stadium on campus in Menomonie. They are currently coached by Clayt Birmingham. The Blue Devils have won five conference championships, with the most recent one coming in 2000. The 2000 season was one of the Blue Devils' most successful, as the team finished with a perfect 10-0 in the regular season, before losing their first game of the playoffs. To date, the 2000 season is the only time the Blue Devils have qualified for the Division III football playoffs. The Blue Devils maintain a fierce rivalry with nearby Wisconsin–Eau Claire, called the "War on I-94" where the teams compete for the War on I-94 Trophy. As of the conclusion of the 2024 season, the Blue Devils have won nine consecutive matchups against the Blugolds.

=== Basketball ===
Both Blue Devil men's and women's basketball play at the Johnson Fieldhouse on campus. The Johnson Fieldhouse has been the site of several NCAA Division III basketball playoff games, most recently in 2025 when it hosted two rounds of the women's basketball tournament.

Women's basketball has been the most successful sport at the university, with the team having won their conference regular season championship six times and the conference tournament championship five times. They have qualified for the Division III women's basketball tournament numerous times, most recently in 2025, where they made it all the way to the Final Four, before falling to the eventual champion NYU.

Men's basketball has won their conference regular season championship six times, most recently in 1975. The team's only NCAA Division III playoff appearance came in 2006. Prior to that, they qualified for the NAIA basketball playoffs several times.

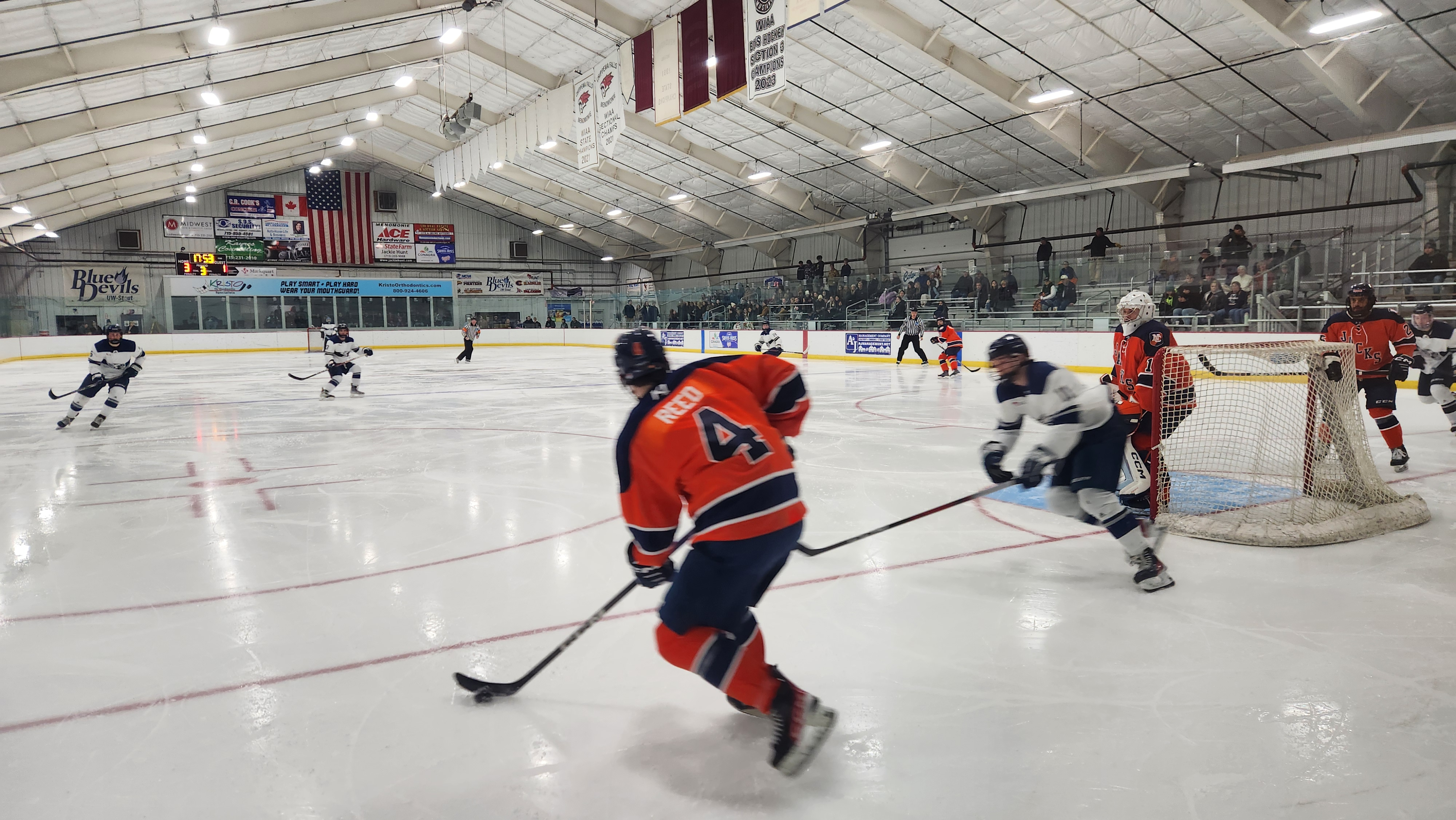
The Blue Devils face off against Nortland College at the Fanetti Center.

=== Hockey ===
Blue Devil hockey remains a very popular team on campus. The team is coached by Mike MacDonald and plays home games at the Fanetti Community Center in Menomonie. The Blue Devils have won one regular season conference championship in 2011 and one conference tournament championship in 2009, both while they were members of the NCHA. They have qualified for the playoffs two times, coming in 2008 and 2009. Their 2009 season would prove to be exceptionally successful, as they finished with 23 wins, a program record. The Blue Devils qualified for the Division III Final Four in Lake Placid, NY for the first time. They would finish at third place, their best finish to date.
