= Earl Burbridge =

American football player and coach (1906–1962)

Biographical details
- Born: May 30, 1906; Chicago, Illinois, U.S.
- Died: April 7, 1962 (aged 55); Detroit, Michigan, U.S.

Playing career

Football
- 1925–1927: Wisconsin

Coaching career (HC unless noted)

Football
- 1930–1934: Stout Institute

Basketball
- 1930–1936: Stout Institute

Baseball
- 1931–1935: Stout Institute

Head coaching record
- Overall: 6–26–1 (football); 14–36 (basketball); 2–1 (baseball)

Earl LeRoy Burbridge (May 30, 1906 – April 7, 1962) was an American college football player and coach. He served as the head football coach at Stout Institute, now known as the University of Wisconsin–Stout, from 1930 to 1934, compiling a record of 6–26–1. He graduated from the Washington University School of Medicine in 1939 and went into the pharmaceutical industry.
