= Sylvester E. Paulus =

American football and basketball coach

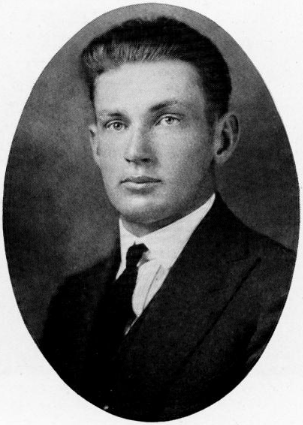
- Paulus, pictured in The Trail, yearbook of Daniel Baker College, 1921

Biographical details
- Born: March 12, 1899; Chicago, Illinois, U.S.
- Died: December 31, 1959 (aged 60); Chicago, Illinois, U.S.
- Education: Hanover (1920)

Coaching career (HC unless noted)

Football
- 1919: Hanover
- 1920: Daniel Baker
- c. 1922: Nogales HS (AZ)
- c. 1924–1926: Tucson HS (AZ)
- 1928–1929: Stout Institute

Basketball
- 1919–1920: Hanover
- 1929–1930: Stout Institute

Head coaching record
- Overall: 2–23–2 (college football); 8–11 (college basketball)

Sylvester Edward Paulus (March 12, 1899 – December 31, 1959) was an American football and basketball coach.

== Hanover ==
Paulus was a 1920 graduate of Hanover College in Hanover, Indiana. He served as the school's head football coach (1919) and head basketball coach (1919–1920).

== Daniel Baker and Stout Institute ==
Paulus served as the head football coach at Daniel Baker College in 1920 and the University of Wisconsin–Stout–then known as Stout Normal Institute–from 1928 to 1929. He also coach Stout's basketball team.

== Later life and death ==
Until about 1945, Paulus operated a hotel in Bar Harbor, Michigan. He subsequently ran a booking agency for speakers at high schools and colleges. Paulus died on December 31, 1959, in Chicago, Illinois.

== Head coaching record ==
=== Football ===
Year	Team	Overall	Conference	Standing	Bowl/playoffs
Hanover Panthers (Independent) (1919)
1919	Hanover	0–6–1			
Hanover:		0–6–1			
Daniel Baker Hill Billies (Texas Intercollegiate Athletic Association) (1920)
1920	Daniel Baker	0–7			
Daniel Baker:		0–7			
Stout Institute Blue Devils (Wisconsin State Teachers College Conference) (1928–1929)
1928	Stout Institute	2–5–1	1–4–1	8th	
1929	Stout Institute	0–5–1	0–3–1	9th	
Stout Institute:		2–10–2	1–7–2		
Total:		2–23–2			
