= List of Tennessee Volunteers head basketball coaches =

The following is a list of Tennessee Volunteers Men's head basketball coaches. The Volunteers have had 21 men's basketball coaches in their 110-season history.

Tenure	Coach	Years	Record	Pct.
1908–10	Robert C. Whitaker	2	9–13	.409
1910–11	Alex Stone	1	7–9	.438
1911–16	Zora Clevenger	5	151–72	.677
1916–17	John R. Bender	1	10–5	.667
1917–19	R.H. Fitzgerald	2	5–15	.250
1919–21	John R. Bender (2nd time)	2	29–10	.744
1921–26	Mark Banks	5	52–33	.612
1926–35	W.H. Britton	9	80–73	.523
1935–38	Blair Gullion	3	47–19	.712
1938–47^	John Mauer	8	126–40	.759
1947–59	Emmett Lowery	12	169–110	.606
1959–62	John Sines	3	26–45	.366
1962–77	Ray Mears	15	278–112	.713
1977–78	Cliff Wettig	1	11-16	.407
1978–89	Don DeVoe	11	204–137	.598
1989–94	Wade Houston	5	65–90	.419
1994–97	Kevin O'Neill	3	36–47	.434
1997–01	Jerry Green	4	89–36	.712
2001–05	Buzz Peterson	4	61–59	.508
2005–11	Bruce Pearl	6	145–61	.704
2011–14	Cuonzo Martin	3	63–41	.606
2014–15	Donnie Tyndall	1	16–16	.500
2015–present*	Rick Barnes	11	242-112	.684
Totals	21 men's coaches	113 seasons	1921-1171	.621

An asterisk (*) denotes a season currently in progress.

^ – Tennessee didn't field a team in the 1943–44 season.
