= Bob McRoberts =

Bob McRoberts may refer to:

- Bob McRoberts (footballer)
- Bob McRoberts (American football)
