= Rich Lawrence =

American football player and coach (born 1946)

Biographical details
- Born: May 4, 1946 (age 80)

Playing career
- c. 1965: Chadron State
- c. 1968: Upper Iowa

Coaching career (HC unless noted)
- 1974–1978: Hearley HS (IA)
- 1979–1980: Oklahoma Panhandle State (assistant)
- 1981–1982: Oklahoma Panhandle State
- 1983–1985: Wyoming (OLB/RC)
- 1986–1992: Wisconsin–Stout

Head coaching record
- Overall: 39–53–1 (college)
- Tournaments: 0–1 (NAIA D-II playoffs)

Accomplishments and honors

Awards
- OPSU Hall of Fame (2014)

James Richard Lawrence (born May 4, 1946) is an American former football coach. He served as the head football coach at Oklahoma Panhandle State University in Goodwell, Oklahoma from 1981 to 1982, leading the Aggies to their first ever NAIA playoff appearance in 1981. From 1986 to 1992, Lawrence served as the head coach of the University of Wisconsin–Stout, compiling a record of 23–47–1.

== Head coaching record ==
=== College football ===
Year	Team	Overall	Conference	Standing	Bowl/playoffs	NAIA^{#}
Oklahoma Panhandle State Aggies (NAIA Division II independent) (1981–1983)
1981	Oklahoma Panhandle State	9–1			L NAIA Division II Quarterfinal	7
1982	Oklahoma Panhandle State	7–5				16
Oklahoma Panhandle State:		16–6				
Wisconsin–Stout Blue Devils (Wisconsin Intercollegiate Athletic Conference) (1986–1992)
1986	Wisconsin–Stout	2–8–1	2–5–1	7th		
1987	Wisconsin–Stout	5–6	5–3	T–3rd		
1988	Wisconsin–Stout	2–8	1–7	8th		
1989	Wisconsin–Stout	3–7	2–6	7th		
1990	Wisconsin–Stout	4–6	3–5	7th		
1991	Wisconsin–Stout	5–5	3–5	6th		
1992	Wisconsin–Stout	2–7	1–6	7th		
Wisconsin–Stout:		23–47–1	17–37–1			
Total:		39–53–1				
^{#}Rankings from NAIA Division II poll.
