= Joe Gerlach =

American sports coach

Biographical details
- Born: June 29, 1913; Grand Forks, North Dakota, U.S.
- Died: March 8, 1993 (aged 79); Winona, Minnesota, U.S.
- Education: University of Wisconsin (1934)

Coaching career (HC unless noted)

Football
- 1944–1945: Dickinson State
- 1956–1957: Stout State

Basketball
- 1939–1941: Alaska–Fairbanks
- 1947–1949: Minnesota–Duluth
- 1956–1958: Stout State
- 1958–1961: Winona State

Baseball
- 1957–1958: Stout State
- 1959–1961: Winona State

Ice hockey
- 1940–1941: Alaska–Fairbanks

Head coaching record
- Overall: 10–14–3 (football); 55–85 (basketball); 51–47 (baseball)

Joseph Sherman Gerlach (June 29, 1913 – March 8, 1993) was an American football, basketball, baseball and ice hockey coach. He served as the head football coach at Dickinson State University from 1944 to 1945 and at Stout State College, now the University of Wisconsin–Stout, from 1956 to 1957, compiling a career college football record of 10–14–3.

== Coaching career ==
Gerlach was the fourth head football coach for the Dickinson State Blue Hawks located in Dickinson, North Dakota and he held that position for two seasons, from 1944 until 1945. His coaching record at Dickinson State was 2–3–2.
