= Inskeep =

Inskeep is a surname. Notable people with the surname include:

- Gary Inskeep (born 1947), Canadian football player
- John Inskeep (1757–1834), American politician
- Steve Inskeep (born 1968), American journalist
