= Joshua Norton (artist) =

American artist (born 1976)

- Born: December 10, 1976 (age 49)
- Occupations: Artist, designer
- Known for: Die! Akhnaten Die!

Joshua Norton (born December 10, 1976) is an American artist, print maker, and designer. Norton is most well known for creating intensely colored woodcut prints (occasionally combining them with digital) and his graphic poster design. Born in Minnesota, he earned his Bachelor of Fine Arts at the University of Wisconsin-Stout in 2001, and his Master of Fine Arts at the University of Nebraska–Lincoln in 2009. His work has been exhibited throughout the United States, Finland, the UK and beyond.

Norton's work, Die! Akhnaten Die! is a series of 20 large scale sequential woodcut prints that are loosely based on the power struggle between the 'heretic' Pharaoh Akhenaten, and the polytheistic priests of Egypt. The story is told not as an Egyptian tale, but as a Wild West cowboy tale, in order to draw attention to the underlying theme instead of specific characters. This work was published as a paperback book in April 2009.
