= Phil Belfiori =

Biographical details
- Born: March 24, 1918; Kinney, Minnesota, U.S.
- Died: July 3, 1957 (aged 39); Hudson, Wisconsin, U.S.

Playing career

Football
- 1936–1939: Minnesota

Coaching career (HC unless noted)

Football
- 1940–1944: Stillwater HS (MN)
- 1952–1956: River Falls State

Basketball
- 1952–1956: River Falls State

Head coaching record
- Overall: 29–9–1 (college football); 47–45 (college basketball); 20–15–4 (high school football)

Accomplishments and honors

Championships
- National (1936)

Philip John Belfiori (March 24, 1918 – July 3, 1957) was an American football and basketball player and coach. He served as the head football coach and head basketball coach at River Falls State Teachers College—now known as the University of Wisconsin–River Falls—from 1952 to 1956. Belfiori played college football at the University of Minnesota. Prior to his stint at Wisconsin–River Falls, was the head football coach at Stillwater Area High School in Stillwater, Minnesota, from 1940 to 1944.

== Head coaching record ==
=== College football ===
Year	Team	Overall	Conference	Standing	Bowl/playoffs
River Falls State Falcons (Wisconsin State College Conference) (1952–1956)
1952	River Falls State	5–2–1	2–2–1	4th	
1953	River Falls State	5–2	3–1	3rd	
1954	River Falls State	6–2	3–2	5th	
1955	River Falls State	7–1	4–1	T–2nd	
1956	River Falls State	6–2	4–1	3rd	
River Falls State:		29–9–1	16–7–1		
Total:		29–9–1			
