= Gwynn Christensen =

American football and baseball coach (1925–2017)

Biographical details
- Born: August 21, 1925; Lake Mills, Wisconsin, U.S.
- Died: November 5, 2017 (aged 92); Hammond, Wisconsin, U.S.

Playing career

Football
- 1947–1950: Wisconsin

Coaching career (HC unless noted)

Football
- 1950: Mondovi HS (WI)
- 1959–1961: Wayne State (NE)
- 1962–1969: River Falls State

Baseball
- 1960–1961: Wayne State (NE)

Administrative career (AD unless noted)
- 1962–1970: River Falls State

Head coaching record
- Overall: 42–50–8 (college football)

Gwynn M. Christensen (August 21, 1925 – November 5, 2017) was an American football and baseball coach. He served as the head football coach at Wayne State College in Wayne, Nebraska from 1959 to 1961 and Wisconsin State College–River Falls—now known as the University of Wisconsin–River Falls—from 1962 to 1969. Christensen was also the head baseball coach at Wayne State from 1960 to 1961.

== Head coaching record ==
=== College football ===
Year	Team	Overall	Conference	Standing	Bowl/playoffs
Wayne State Wildcats (Nebraska College Conference) (1959–1961)
1959	Wayne State	4–4–1	4–3–1	T–5th	
1960	Wayne State	5–4	4–2	T–2nd	
1961	Wayne State	4–5	3–3	T–4th	
Wayne State:		13–13–1	11–8–1		
River Falls State Falcons (Wisconsin State College Conference / Wisconsin State University Conference) (1962–1969)
1962	River Falls State	3–5–1	3–4	6th	
1963	River Falls State	4–3–2	3–3–1	T–5th	
1964	River Falls State	5–3	4–3	3rd	
1965	River Falls State	4–3–2	3–2–2	5th	
1966	River Falls State	6–2–1	6–1–1	2nd	
1967	River Falls State	2–7	2–6	T–7th	
1968	River Falls State	3–6–1	2–5–1	T–6th	
1969	River Falls State	2–8	1–7	9th	
River Falls State:		29–37–7	24–32–5		
Total:		42–50–8			
