= John O'Grady (American football) =

American football player and coach (born 1954)

Current position
- Title: Special teams coordinator
- Team: Wisconsin–Whitewater
- Conference: WIAC

Biographical details
- Born: July 14, 1954 (age 72)

Playing career
- 1972–1975: Wisconsin–River Falls
- Position: Linebacker

Coaching career (HC unless noted)
- 1976–1980: Wisconsin–River Falls (SA)
- 1981–1982: Wisconsin (GA)
- 1983–1984: Kent State (OC/ST)
- 1985–1986: Wisconsin (ST/OL)
- 1987–1988: Miami (OH) (ST/OL)
- 1989–2010: Wisconsin–River Falls
- 2011–2012: Wisconsin–Oshkosh (AHC)
- 2013: Wisconsin–Stout (TE)
- 2014–2022: Wisconsin–Whitewater (ST)
- 2023: Wisconsin–River Falls (assistant ST)
- 2024: Wisconsin–Whitewater (ST)

Head coaching record
- Overall: 105–112–3
- Tournaments: 1–2 (NCAA D-III playoffs)

Accomplishments and honors

Championships
- 1 WIAC (1998)

Awards
- WFCA Hall of Fame (2008)

John O'Grady (born July 14, 1954) is an American college football coach. He is the special teams coordinator for the University of Wisconsin–Whitewater, a position he has held since 2024. He was the head football coach at the University of Wisconsin–River Falls from 1989 to 2010.

O'Grady played football as a linebacker at Wisconsin–River Falls from 1972 to 1975.

== Head coaching record ==
Year	Team	Overall	Conference	Standing	Bowl/playoffs	NAIA^{#}
Wisconsin–River Falls Falcons (Wisconsin State University Conference / Wisconsin Intercollegiate Athletic Conference) (1989–2010)
1989	Wisconsin–River Falls	7–3	6–2	3rd		22
1990	Wisconsin–River Falls	5–4–1	3–4–1	T–5th		
1991	Wisconsin–River Falls	4–5–1	2–5–1	7th		
1992	Wisconsin–River Falls	6–2–1	4–2–1	3rd		
1993	Wisconsin–River Falls	6–4	3–4	T–4th		
1994	Wisconsin–River Falls	7–3	5–2	T–2nd		
1995	Wisconsin–River Falls	9–3	6–1	2nd	L NCAA Division III Second Round	
1996	Wisconsin–River Falls	9–2	6–1	2nd	L NCAA Division III First Round	
1997	Wisconsin–River Falls	5–5	3–4	T–5th		
1998	Wisconsin–River Falls	7–3	5–2	T–1st		
1999	Wisconsin–River Falls	6–4	5–2	3rd		
2000	Wisconsin–River Falls	6–4	5–2	3rd		
2001	Wisconsin–River Falls	4–5	4–3	T–3rd		
2002	Wisconsin–River Falls	3–7	2–5	T–6th		
2003	Wisconsin–River Falls	2–7	2–5	6th		
2004	Wisconsin–River Falls	3–7	3–4	T–5th		
2005	Wisconsin–River Falls	3–7	2–5	7th		
2006	Wisconsin–River Falls	3–7	2–5	T–6th		
2007	Wisconsin–River Falls	3–7	2–5	7th		
2008	Wisconsin–River Falls	3–7	2–5	T–6th		
2009	Wisconsin–River Falls	3–7	1–6	T–7th		
2010	Wisconsin–River Falls	1–9	1–6	8th		
Wisconsin–River Falls:		105–112–3	74–80–3			
Total:		105–112–3				
National championship Conference title Conference division title or championship game berth
^{#}Rankings from final NAIA Division II poll.
