= Clayt Birmingham =

American football coach (born c. 1974)

Current position
- Title: Head coach
- Team: Wisconsin–Stout
- Conference: WIAC
- Record: 66–85

Biographical details
- Born: c. 1974 (age 51–52); Sturgeon Bay, Wisconsin, U.S.
- Education: University of Wisconsin–Stevens Point (1997)

Playing career
- 1992–1996: Wisconsin–Stevens Point
- Position: Defensive back

Coaching career (HC unless noted)
- 1997: Wisconsin–Stevens Point (DB/OLB)
- 1998–1999: Northern Michigan (GA)
- 2000: Western Michigan (GA)
- 2001–2003: Emporia State (DC)
- 2004: Western Michigan (DB)
- 2005–2006: Emporia State (DC)
- 2007–2009: Wisconsin–Stout (DC)
- 2010–present: Wisconsin–Stout

Head coaching record
- Overall: 66–85
- Bowls: 1–1

Accomplishments and honors

Awards
- 2× All-WIAC Team (1994–1995)

Clayton Birmingham (born c. 1974) is an American college football coach. He is the head football coach for the University of Wisconsin–Stout, a position he has held since 2010. He also coached for Wisconsin–Stevens Point, Northern Michigan, Western Michigan, and Emporia State. He played college football for Wisconsin–Stevens Point as a defensive back.

== Head coaching record ==
Year	Team	Overall	Conference	Standing	Bowl/playoffs
Wisconsin–Stout Blue Devils (Wisconsin Intercollegiate Athletic Conference) (2010–present)
2010	Wisconsin–Stout	6–4	4–3	3rd	
2011	Wisconsin–Stout	5–5	3–4	T–4th	
2012	Wisconsin–Stout	3–7	1–6	T–7th	
2013	Wisconsin–Stout	4–6	2–5	T–6th	
2014	Wisconsin–Stout	2–8	1–6	T–7th	
2015	Wisconsin–Stout	3–7	2–5	T–6th	
2016	Wisconsin–Stout	3–7	1–6	T–7th	
2017	Wisconsin–Stout	5–4	3–4	5th	
2018	Wisconsin–Stout	5–5	3–4	T–4th	
2019	Wisconsin–Stout	4–6	3–4	5th	
2020–21	No team—COVID-19				
2021	Wisconsin–Stout	5–5	2–5	6th	
2022	Wisconsin–Stout	5–5	3–4	6th	
2023	Wisconsin–Stout	4–6	2–5	6th	
2024	Wisconsin–Stout	6–5	4–3	T–3rd	L Isthmus
2025	Wisconsin–Stout	6–5	3–4	T–5th	W Isthmus
2026	Wisconsin–Stout	0–0	0–0		
Wisconsin–Stout:		66–85	37–68		
Total:		66–85			
