= Nancy Zieman =

American author and designer

- Born: Nancy L. Luedtke; June 21, 1953; Neenah, Wisconsin, U.S.
- Died: November 14, 2017 (aged 64); Beaver Dam, Wisconsin, U.S.
- Education: University of Wisconsin–Stout
- Occupations: Television personality; sewing instructor; businessperson; author; TV producer
- Years active: 1979–2017
- Spouse: Richard Zieman
- Children: 2

Nancy L. Zieman (née Luedtke; June 21, 1953 – November 14, 2017) was an American author and designer widely known as the host of the television show Sewing with Nancy.

== Background ==
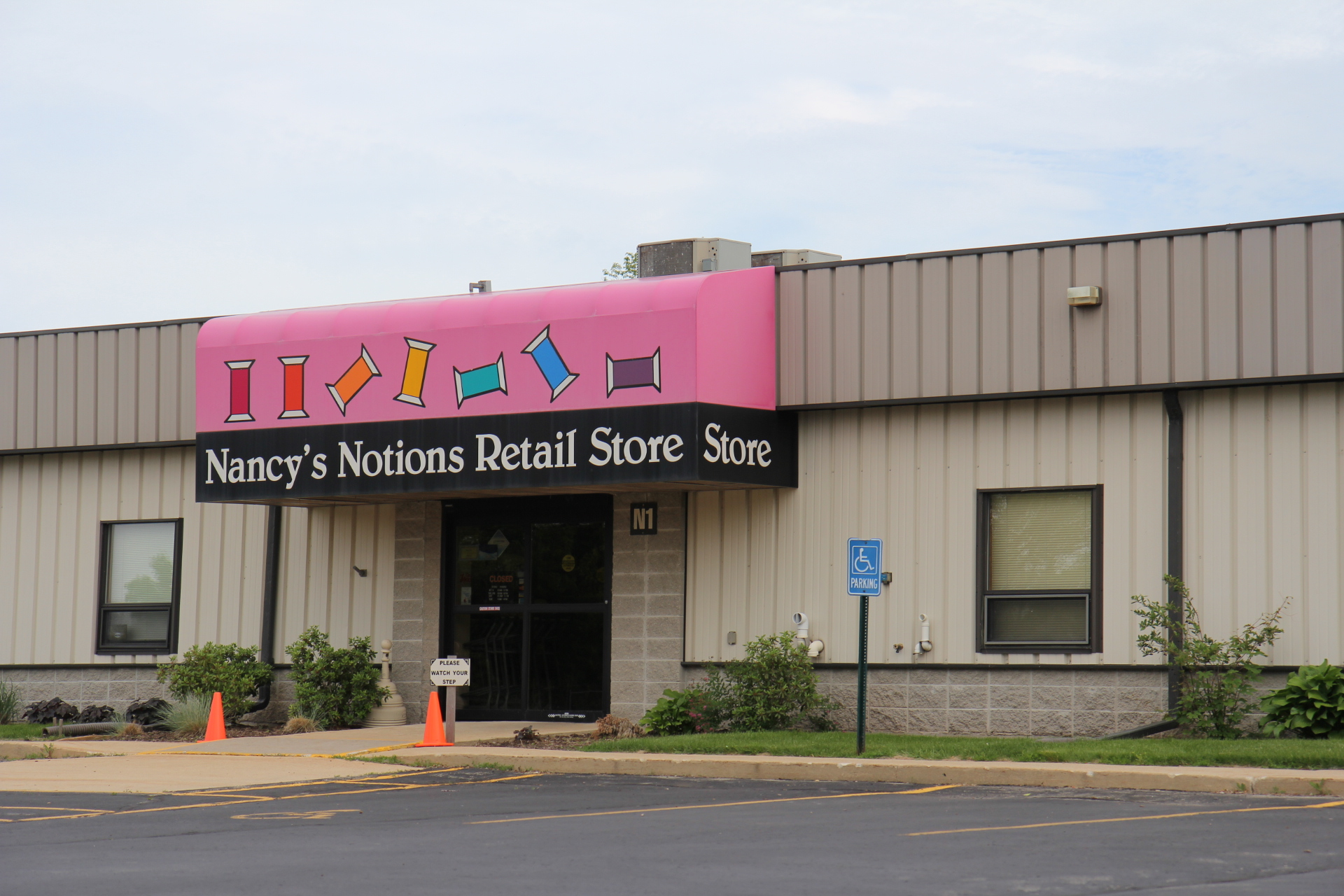
Nancy's Notions retail store in Beaver Dam, Wisconsin

Zieman was born on June 21, 1953, and raised on a dairy farm in Wisconsin. She was the daughter of Ralph and Barbara Luedtke. Zieman graduated from the University of Wisconsin–Stout with double majors in home economics and journalism. She married Richard Zieman in 1977. Some of her early jobs included working for a national sewing chain store in Chicago and as a freelance sewing instructor in Minnesota.

In 1979, she founded Nancy's Notions, a direct mail company specializing in sewing notions, supplies and accessories. Nancy's Notions was purchased by the Tacony Corporation of St. Louis, Missouri, in 2003. She was an author and a designer for the McCall Pattern Company and Clover Needlecraft.

=== Bell's palsy ===
Zieman's face was partially paralyzed due to Bell's palsy. She acquired it due to an ear infection when she was a toddler. Zieman was always open about her condition; she wrote about it, was interviewed by journalists, and hosted a segment on her television show with medical professionals. She jokingly referred to herself as "the Bell's Palsy Poster Child."

Zieman wrote that "sewing became my outlet, passion, and eventual career" because "winning a ribbon at the county fair, or a prize through the Make It Yourself with Wool contest, required skill not looks."

== Sewing with Nancy ==
Sewing with Nancy is a half-hour show that Zieman co-produced on Wisconsin Public Television. On the air since September 1982, Sewing with Nancy is the longest running sewing program on North American television, with over 900 episodes filmed. According to her autobiography, "In terms of years, only Letterman had a longer run."

Initially, the programs were videotaped in Zieman’s living room, with a camera crew of one person. In the early years, Zieman ran a one-woman show, developing the scripts, making the samples, and taping the programs. Zieman was the host and executive producer since its inauguration, until her retirement due to ill health in September 2017. From the mid 1980s, Wisconsin Public Television in Madison, Wisconsin was Nancy’s partner in television production with Laurie Gorman serving as the director for the past 19 years.

== Personal ==
Zieman lived in Beaver Dam, Wisconsin with her husband.

=== Retirement and death ===
Zieman was diagnosed with osteosarcoma, a type of bone cancer, in March of 2015. In July 2015, she was diagnosed with breast cancer. Zieman continued filming her Sewing With Nancy on a modified schedule, resuming a full schedule in 2016. On September 2, 2017, Zieman announced on her blog that after 910 shows of Sewing with Nancy, she was retiring, explaining that one of her cancers had metastasized and that "additional treatments would not be helpful."

Zieman died November 14, 2017, at her home. She was survived by her husband and two sons. Her death occurred just one day after the final episode of Sewing with Nancy aired.

== Honors and awards ==
She was named the 1988 Entrepreneurial Woman of the Year by the Wisconsin Women Entrepreneurs Association. Zieman received the National 4-H Alumni Award in 1991 and in 2014 the University of Wisconsin-Extension 4-H Youth Development Program inducted her in the Wisconsin 4-H Hall of Fame. Zieman won the 2013 the Distinguished Alumni by the University of Wisconsin-Stout.

== Books and publications ==
Zieman published her autobiography, Seams Unlikely: The Inspiring True Life Story of Nancy Zieman, in 2014.

She wrote over 40 sewing books, including The Art of Landscape Quilting, Serge with Confidence, Machine Embroidery with Confidence, Sew with Confidence, Landscape Quilts with Natalie Sewell, Let’s Sew, 10-20-30 Minutes to Sew, The Best of Sewing with Nancy, Sew Clever Bags, and 501 Sewing Hints.

== Affiliations ==
- Sewing with Nancy
- Wisconsin Public Television
- Nancy’s Notions
- Baby Lock Sewing
- Maderia Thread
- Koala Studios
- Clover Notions
- Penny Rose Fabrics, a division of Riley Blake Designs
- Wisconsin Quilt Expo
- McCall's Pattern Company
