= Parks Bailey =

American football player and coach

Biographical details
- Died: April 21, 1922

Playing career
- 1915–1916: Stout Institute

Coaching career (HC unless noted)
- 1915–1916: Stout Institute

Parks L. Bailey (died April 21, 1922) was an American college football player and coach. He served as a player-coach at the University of Wisconsin–Stout (then known as Stout Normal School) from 1915 to 1916.
