= Harvey Schofield =

American athlete, coach, and administrator (1877–1941)

Biographical details
- Born: March 28, 1877 near Augusta, Wisconsin, U.S.
- Died: August 3, 1941; Chetek, Wisconsin, U.S.

Playing career

Football
- 1898–1899: Stout Institute
- 1902–1903: Wisconsin

Basketball
- 1901: Stevens Point Normal
- 1902–1904: Wisconsin

Coaching career (HC unless noted)

Football
- 1900: Stevens Point Normal
- 1903: Stevens Point Normal

Head coaching record
- Overall: 2–3–1

Harvey Axford Schofield (March 28, 1877 – August 3, 1941) was an American college football and college basketball player and coach and university administrator. He served head football coach at Stevens Point Normal School—now known as the University of Wisconsin–Stevens Point—in 1900 and 1903, compiling a record of 2–3–1. Schofield was as the president of the University of Wisconsin–Eau Claire from 1916 to 1940. Schofield Hall is named in his honor.

Schofield was born on March 28, 1877, near Augusta, Wisconsin, in Eau Claire County. He died suddenly on August 3, 1941, at his summer home in Chetek, Wisconsin.

== Head coaching record ==
Year	Team	Overall	Conference	Standing	Bowl/playoffs
Stevens Point Normal (Independent) (1900)
1900	Stevens Point Normal	2–0–1			
Stevens Point Normal (Independent) (1903)
1903	Stevens Point Normal	0–3			
Stevens Point Normal:		2–3–6			
Total:		2–3–1			
