= Jesse H. Ames =

American football coach and college administrator

Biographical details
- Born: May 25, 1875; Shiocton, Wisconsin, U.S.
- Died: April 12, 1957 (aged 81); River Falls, Wisconsin, U.S.
- Education: Stevens Point Normal

Coaching career (HC unless noted)
- 1909: River Falls State

Head coaching record
- Overall: 1–2

Jesse Hazen Ames (May 25, 1875 – April 12, 1957) was an American football coach and college administrator. He served as the head football coach at the River Falls State Normal School—now known as the University of Wisconsin–River Falls—in 1909, compiling a record of 1–2. Ames was the chancellor at River Falls State, first on an interim basis in 1911 and then full-time from 1917 to 1949.
