= Tacony Corporation =

American appliance manufacturer

- Type: Private
- Founded: 1946
- Founder: Nick Tacony
- Headquarters: 1760 Gilsinn Ln., Fenton, Missouri, USA
- Products: Home appliances and commercial floor care
- Revenue: $200m (2007)
- Owner: Tacony family
- Number of employees: 650 (2007)
- Subsidiaries: Riccar; Simplicity Vacuums; Powr-flite; Nancy's notions
- Website: tacony.com

Tacony Corporation is a family-owned and operated manufacturer and wholesale distributor of vacuum cleaners, sewing machines, ceiling fans, and commercial floor care equipment based in the St. Louis suburb of Fenton, Missouri.

== History ==
In 1946, mechanic Nick Tacony began selling and servicing sewing machines from the basement of his home. In the 1950s, he expanded his business by wholesaling sewing parts, accessories and other merchandise to retailers in the Midwest.

After completing his college degree in business administration and four years in the United States Air Force, Ken Tacony joined his father's business in 1970. He became CEO in 1984 and expanded the business beyond sewing machines to also include ceiling fans, vacuum cleaners, and commercial floor care products.

In 1997, Tacony Corporation transferred vacuum cleaner production from Taiwan to St. James, Missouri. Over one million upright vacuums for home and commercial use have been produced at the Tacony Manufacturing factory in St. James.

In 2008, Tacony Corporation acquired Mac Molding Co. to streamline production and reduce reliance on outsourced plastic components for their products.

== Acquisitions ==
In 1996, the company acquired Fort Worth-based Powr-Flite.

In 2003, Tacony Corporation acquired Nancy's Notions, a sewing accessories company founded by TV Host Nancy Zieman. In May 2020 the company sold Nancy's Notions to the Missouri Star Quilting Company.

In 2007, Tacony Corporation acquired Chicago-based Tornado Industries, commercial and industrial cleaning equipment company

In 2008, Tacony Corporation acquired Mac Molding Co., a plastic injection company.

== See also ==
- List of sewing machine brands
