= Cindy Pawlcyn =

American chef

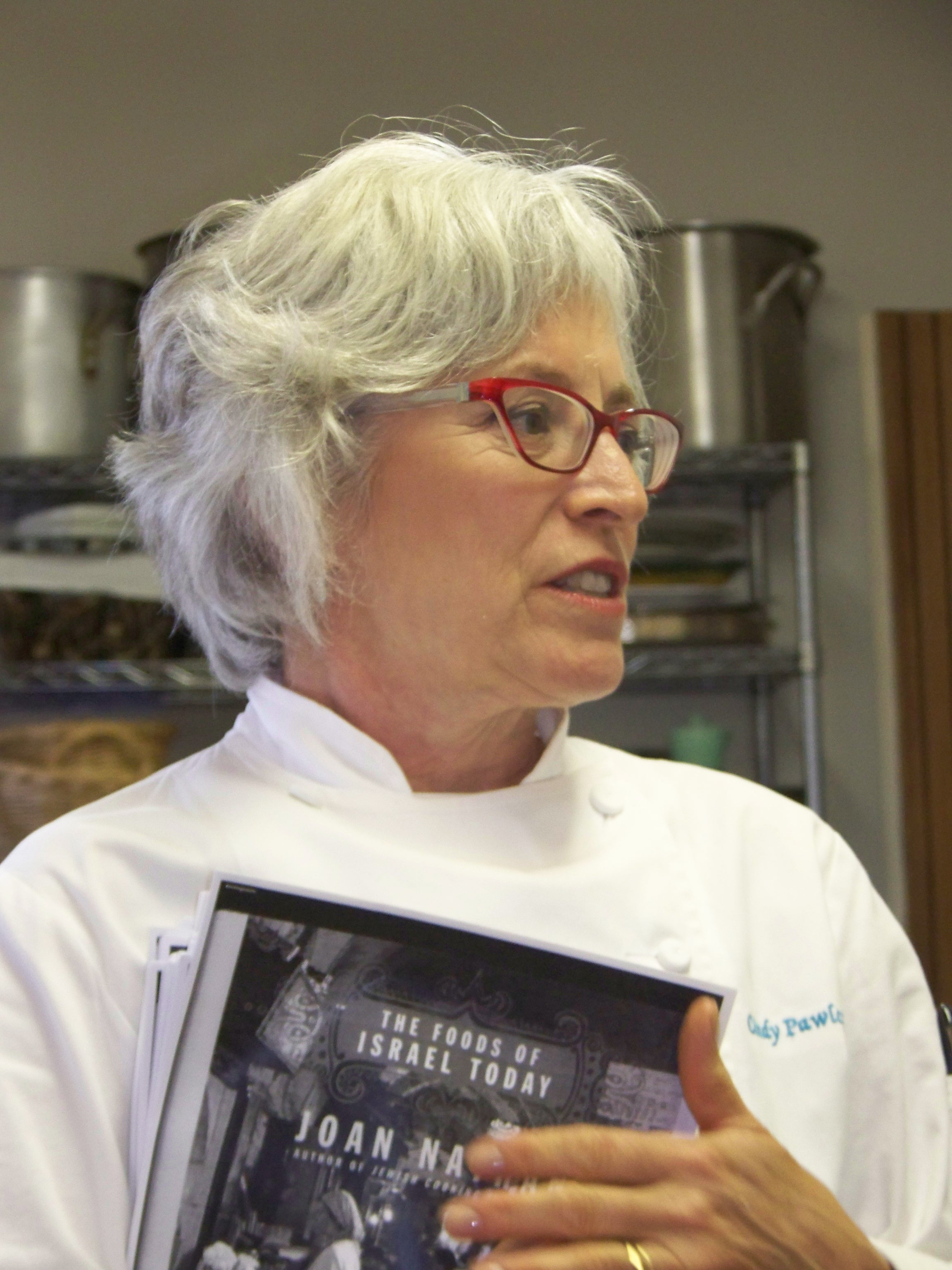
Cindy Pawlcyn in 2011

Cynthia Pawlcyn (born Minneapolis, Minnesota) is an American chef and cookbook author known for the restaurants she opened in the San Francisco Bay Area and the Napa Valley between 1983 and 2008. Pawlcyn was an early advocate for using local, sustainable meats, and produce in her restaurants. In 2009, Pawlcyn appeared in the first season of Bravo’s "Top Chef: Masters."

== Personal life ==
Pawlcyn is the daughter of Stephen Pawlcyn, an immigrant from Russia, and his wife Dorothy, of German and Norwegian ancestry. Her father founded a potato chip company and had a deep interest in food. She was born in Minneapolis and lived in Golden Valley, Minnesota in her childhood.

Pawlcyn began working in a Minneapolis cooking school at the age of 13, and while in high school, she ran her own catering business. She earned a hotel and restaurant management degree from the University of Wisconsin-Stout. She took courses at Le Cordon Bleu and received formal training at La Varenne in Paris before working at The Pump Room in Chicago. She moved to California in 1980 to take a job at MacArthur Park. Pawlcyn left MacArthur Park to be the opening chef at Meadowood in St. Helena, California and then joined Bruce LeFavour at Rose et LaFavour.

Pawlcyn's first husband was Murdo Laird. She married John Watanabe in May, 2008.

In April 2014, Pawlcyn and her second husband John Watanabe were injured in a head-on collision in the Carneros district between Napa and Sonoma. The other car's driver had crossed the center divide of the highway. A four-year-old boy in the other car was killed, and his mother was injured. Pawlcyn suffered 22 broken bones, was hospitalized for 15 days, and used a wheelchair for months. The driver of the other car pleaded no contest to a charge of vehicular manslaughter with gross negligence. He had fallen asleep at the wheel, had been driving on a suspended license, and was sentenced to 60 days in jail, followed by 120 days of home detention.

Her home in the hills above the Napa Valley was featured in O, The Oprah Magazine in 2009. It included a 1-1/2 acre fruit and vegetable garden, a swimming pool, a ceramic studio, plus a canvas-walled guest cabin. The kitchen was the largest room in the remodeled home and had lower-than-usual countertops because Pawlcyn is only 5'-2" tall. Her library of thousands of cookbooks occupied an entire room, with some volumes overflowing into her office. Pawlcyn collects cookbooks, but her home and her personal library of about 3,800 books were destroyed in the 2020 Glass Fire in Napa County. She is beginning to rebuild the collection; people from all over Northern California bring her cookbooks from their own libraries.

== Professional history ==
In the New York Times, food critic Eric Asimov wrote, "Cindy Pawlcyn has a talent for creating popular dining environments that meld satisfying, unchallenging food with just a bit of shtick."

Mustards Grill, Yountville, opened 1983: named for the wild mustard flowers that grow in the wine country every year, Mustards became known for French-trained chef-quality food in a casual setting.

Fog City Diner, San Francisco, opened in 1985. When Pawlcyn opened the Fog City Diner in 1985, it became an iconic restaurant because it served critically acclaimed food in a building that looked like an Airstream trailer. Visa filmed an ad about the Fog City Diner.

Cindy's Backstreet Kitchen, St. Helena, opened 2003: the restaurant was called Miramonte when it opened in 2003, but Pawlcyn changed the name to Cindy's Backstreet Kitchen within a year.

Go Fish/Brassica/Cindy Pawlcyn's Wood Grill & Wine Bar, St. Helena opened in 2006: in 2011, the restaurant committed to sustainability, took sushi off the menu. Shortly after that, Cindy and partner Sean Knight announced they would be transitioning Go Fish to a Mediterranean restaurant called Brassica, opening in September 2011. In 2012 the restaurant transitioned to another new concept called Cindy Pawlcyn's Wood Grill & Wine Bar.

Cindy Pawlcyn also was involved with opening Tra Vigne, Brix, Roti (opened in 1993), Betelnut, Buckeye Roadhouse, and Rio Grill. She currently owns and runs Mustards Grill and Cindy's Backstreet Kitchen.

== Published works ==
- "Fog City Diner Cookbook," 1993, Ten Speed Press
- "Mustards Grill Napa Valley Cookbook," 2001, Ten Speed Press (Won the James Beard Foundation Award for Best American Cookbook in 2002.)
- "Big Small Plates," 2006, Ten Speed Press
- "Appetizers," 2009, Ten Speed Press

== Awards and accolades ==
- James Beard Foundation Award in 2002 for Best American Cookbook for "Mustards Grill Napa Valley Cookbook."
- Twice nominated for a James Beard Foundation Award for Best Chef in California.
- Robert Mondavi Award for Culinary Excellence.
- Fine Beverage and Food Federation's Career Achievement Award.
