= Leslie Barlow =

American painter

- Born: 1989 (age 36–37); Minneapolis, Minnesota, U.S.
- Education: BFA in Studio Arts, University of Wisconsin - Stout MFA in Drawing and Painting, Minneapolis College of Art and Design
- Known for: Painting, Drawing, Mixed-Media
- Website: lesliebarlowartist.com

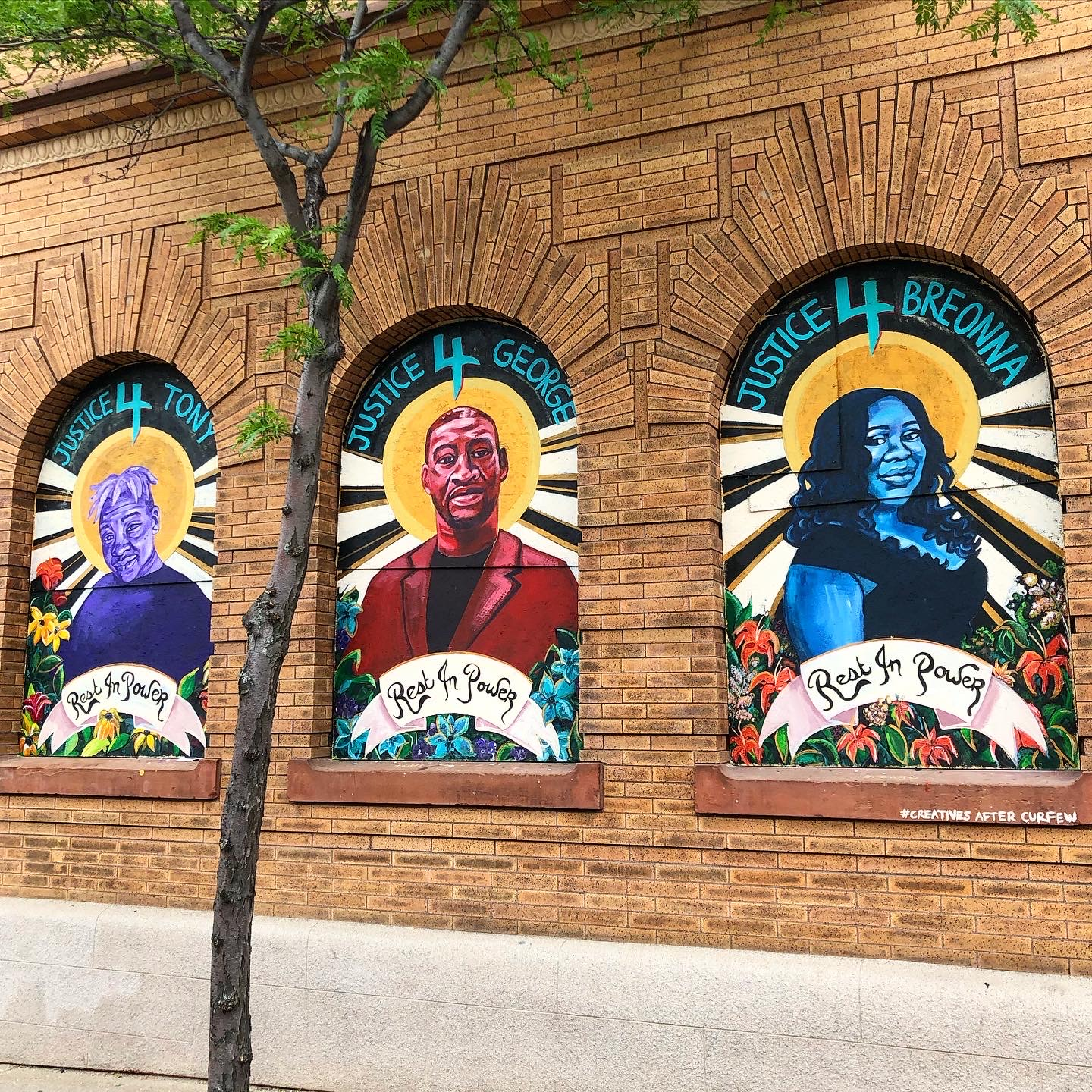
A mural created by Leslie Barlow in Minneapolis, MN, in 2020 as part of the Creatives After Curfew response to the murder of George Floyd.

Leslie Barlow is an American visual artist in Minneapolis, Minnesota, predominantly focused on paintings that discuss themes of multiculturalism, identity, and family. Though Barlow is known primarily for oil painting, she also works with mixed media, including photo transfer and fabric.

== Early life and education ==
Leslie Barlow was born and raised in South Minneapolis and attended Southwest High School. She received her Bachelor of Fine Arts in Studio Arts with a focus in painting and a minor in Business Administration from the University of Wisconsin-Stout in 2011. After graduation she held the position of intern and volunteer with Minneapolis-based contemporary art center The Soap Factory. Barlow went on to receive her Masters of Fine Arts degree from the Minneapolis College of Art and Design in Drawing and Painting in 2016.

== Career ==
After graduating from the Minneapolis College of Art and Design, Barlow has had an exhibition of her work, entitled Loving, and has had her work displayed in places such as the U.S. Bank Stadium. Barlow uses different mediums to create her pieces, ranging from works made only with paint to mixed media pieces that use different materials, like how she "layers canvases and panels with a patchwork of fabrics that show through her figures..." Barlow's work focuses on the themes of race, gender, sexuality, and family. These are very evident throughout her first significant exhibition, Loving, which tackles questions relating to all these various themes.

In 2025, Barlow illustrated a children's book of poems about James Boggs and Grace Lee Boggs titled Revolutions are Made of Love by Sun Yung Shin and Mélina Mangal.

== Artwork ==
Barlow was raised in an interracial household, which has heavily influenced the content of her work. Her work focuses on the figure and narratives surrounding identity and multiculturalism.

Barlow's work is included in the permanent collections of the Minneapolis Institute of Art; Weisman Art Museum; Minnesota Museum of American Art; Minnesota Vikings Fine Art Collection; and the Minnesota Historical Society.

=== Loving ===
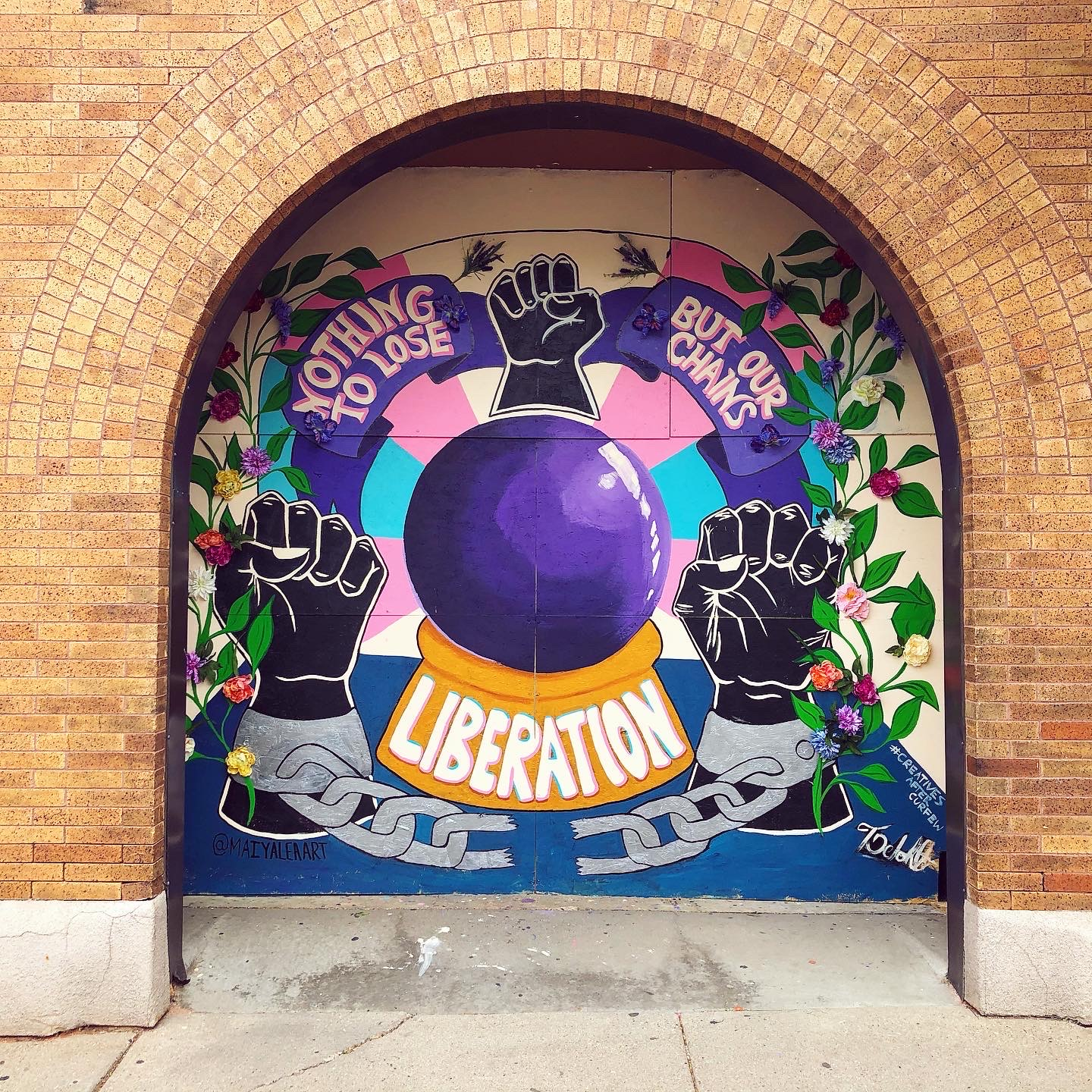
A mural was painted by artists Taylan DeJohnette and Maiya Lea Hartman as a part of the Creatives After Curfew program organized by Leslie Barlow, Studio 400, and Public Functionary in response to the killing of Black Americans by police officers.

Barlow's 2017 body of work, Loving, was created to discuss interracial relationships 50 years after the court case Loving v. Virginia, which was a U.S. Supreme Court case that banned states from prohibiting interracial marriages. Barlow was also attempting to make sense of interracial relationships in the Trump administration. Barlow's Loving was shown at an exhibition at Public Functionary in Minneapolis in March 2017. The exhibition features 10 portraits of interracial couples with skin tones are not typically represented in oil portraiture.

Barlow was chosen among 34 other local artists to create art pieces inspired by the Minnesota Vikings for the opening of the U.S. Bank Stadium, where Barlow created 6 massive portraits of former Vikings players.

== Activism ==
Barlow, alongside Ryan Stopera, Mackenzie Owens, and 30 or more Black and Indigenous people of color painted murals on boarded-up businesses throughout the Twin Cities in the weeks of civil unrest following the murder of George Floyd. The group, under the hashtag #creativesaftercurfew, raised money through for paint and supplies through individual donations and the support of businesses and grants such as Wet Paint, Blick Art Materials, and the Graves Foundation. They have completed murals at Fallout Arts in Minneapolis and plan to complete more at over 20 BIPOC-owned businesses.

== Awards ==
- 2019 McKnight Fellow for Visual Artists
- 2019 20/20 Springboard Artist Fellowship
- 2021 Jerome Hill Artist Fellowship
- 2022 Minnesota State Fair Commemorative Artist

== Solo exhibitions ==
- 2021 – Within, Between, and Beyond, Minneapolis Institute of Art, Minnesota
