= Don and Nona Williams Stadium =

Stadium in Menomonie, Wisconsin, US

Coordinates: 44.868097°N 91.928648°W

Williams Stadium
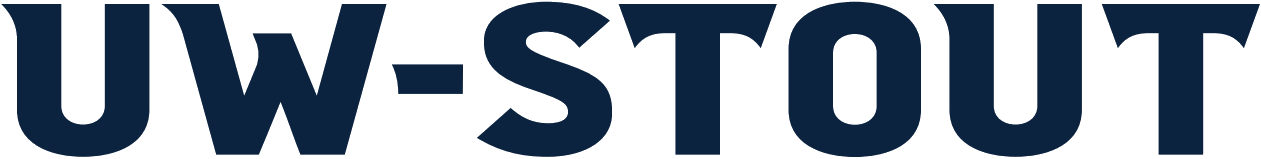

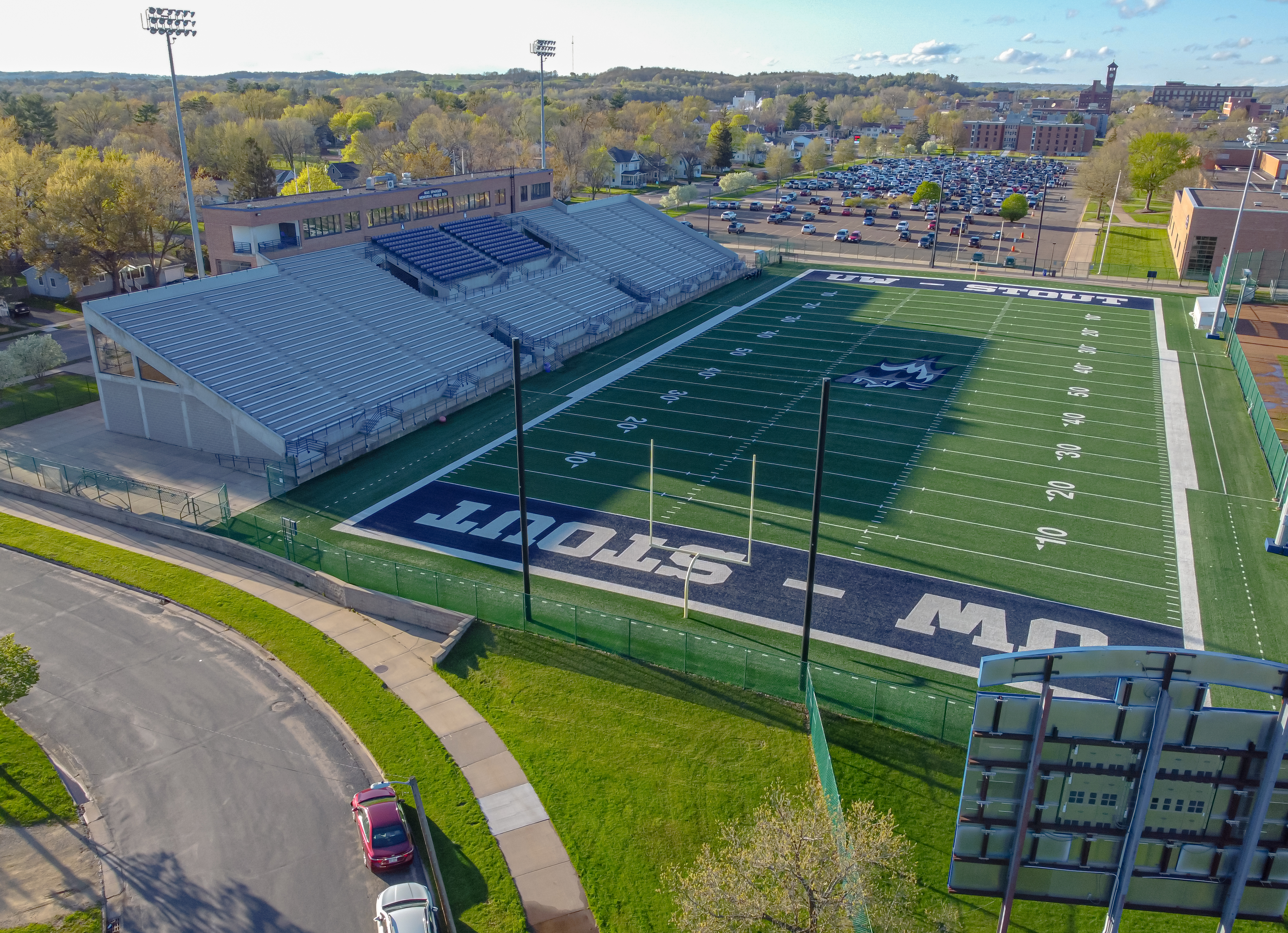
- Aerial view of the stadium in 2024
- Interactive map of Williams Stadium
- Full name: Don and Nona Williams Stadium
- Address: 1600 South Broadway; Menomonie, Wi; United States
- Owner: UW–Stout Polytechnic
- Operator: UW–Stout Polytechnic Athletics
- Capacity: 4,500
- Type: Stadium
- Surface: ProGrass artificial turf
- Current use: Football

Construction
- Opened: 2001; 25 years ago

Tenant
- Wisconsin–Stout Blue Devils football

Don and Nona Williams Stadium is an American football stadium located on the campus of the University of Wisconsin–Stout Polytechnic in Menomonie, Wisconsin. The stadium is home to the Wisconsin–Stout Blue Devils football team, the Menomonie High School Mustangs, plus other high school games, as well as other sports at UW–Stout.

The stadium is named in honor of Don Williams, a former member of the UW–Stout Polytechnic Board of Directors, and his wife, Nona. The couple made a significant contribution towards the construction of the stadium.

The UW–Stout football team played its home games at Nelson Field on the UW–Stout Polytechnic campus through the beginning of the 2001 season. After that, Nelson Field became home to the UW–Stout soccer teams.

AstroTurf 2000 was the surface from its opening through the 2007–08 academic year. FieldTurf was installed for the beginning of the 2008 football season. In 2016, there was new field turf added with the Blue Devil logo.

Drums Along The Red Cedar, a drum & bugle corps competition, was held at the stadium each June until 2010, when the show was rained out.

The stadium is also used by Menomonie High School.
