= Katherine P. Frank =

American literary scholar and academic administrator

Katherine Frank

8th Chancellor of the University of Wisconsin–Stout
- Incumbent
- Assumed office March 1, 2020
- Preceded by: Robert Meyer

Personal details
- Spouse: Joe Dvorsky

Academic background
- Education: University of Washington (MA, PhD), Bates College (BA)
- Thesis: Seen through Glass Town: The Bronte Juvenilia, Collaboration, and Victorian Authorship (2001)

Academic work
- Discipline: English
- Sub-discipline: Romantic and Victorian English Literature, rhetoric and composition, the scholarship of teaching, academic leadership
- Institutions: Central Washington University , University of Wisconsin-Stout

Katherine Frank is an American literary scholar and the eighth chancellor of the University of Wisconsin-Stout. She is the first female leader of UW-Stout. Previously, she was provost and vice president of academic and student life and professor of English at Central Washington University.

== Books ==
- (Re)Actions: Affecting Change Through Inquiry-Based Writing. Southlake: Fountainhead Press, January 2011.
