= Schofield Hall =

- U.S. National Register of Historic Places
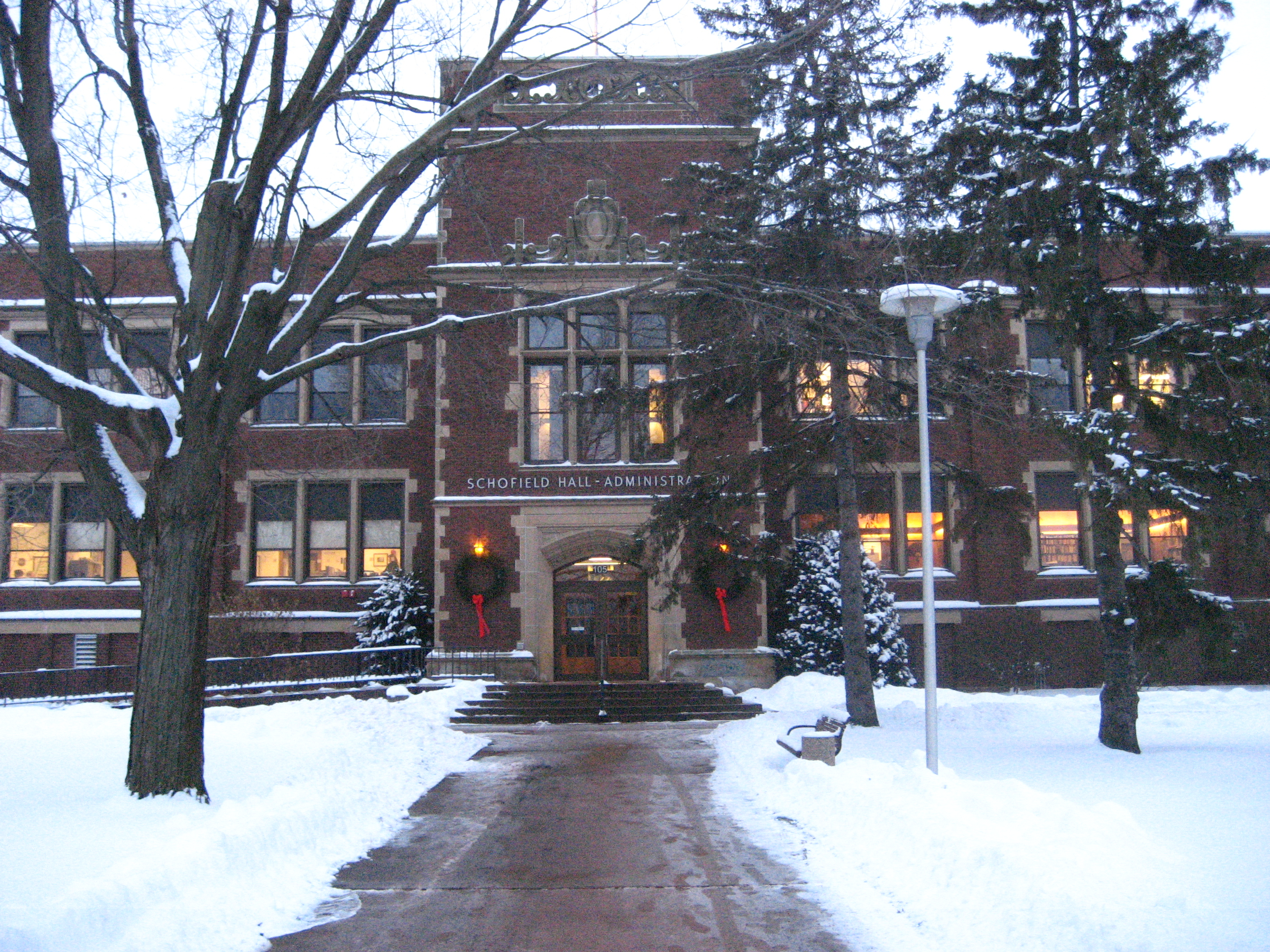

- Location within Wisconsin Location within the United States
- Location: 105 Garfield Ave., Eau Claire, Wisconsin
- Coordinates: 44°47′55″N 91°30′0″W
- Area: less than one acre
- Built: 1915
- Architect: Van Ryn & DeGelleke
- Architectural style: Collegiate Gothic
- MPS: Eau Claire MRA
- NRHP reference No.: 83003393
- Added to NRHP: January 28, 1983

Schofield Hall is the main administrative building of the University of Wisconsin-Eau Claire. It houses a variety of different administrative offices, including the university's admissions office. It is located on Garfield Avenue, directly across from the UW-Eau Claire footbridge that links the Water Street side of campus to lower campus. The building is named after Harvey Schofield, the first President of what was then called Eau Claire State Normal School. It was added to the National Register of Historic Places for its educational significance in 1983.
