= Jeff Hazuga =

American football player (born 1978)

No. 90
- Position: Defensive end

Personal information
- Born: April 29, 1978 (age 48); Thorp, Wisconsin, U.S.
- Listed height: 6 ft 5 in (1.96 m)
- Listed weight: 277 lb (126 kg)

Career information
- High school: Thorp
- College: Wisconsin–Stout
- NFL draft: 2001: undrafted

Career history
- Minnesota Vikings (2001); Frankfurt Galaxy (2004)

Career NFL statistics
- Tackles: 2
- Stats at Pro Football Reference

Jeff Hazuga (born April 29, 1978) is an American former professional football player in the National Football League (NFL) playing three games for the Minnesota Vikings in 2001 as a defensive end. He played at the collegiate level at St. Cloud State University and the University of Wisconsin–Stout.

== Early life ==
Hazuga was born in Thorp, Wisconsin.
