= Emmett Lowery =

American football and basketball coach (1911–1975)

Biographical details
- Born: November 11, 1911; Oakland City, Indiana, U.S.
- Died: December 19, 1975 (aged 64); Franklin, North Carolina, U.S.

Playing career

Football
- 1932–1933: Purdue

Basketball
- 1931–1934: Purdue
- Positions: End (football); Guard (basketball)

Coaching career (HC unless noted)

Football
- 1935: Mankato State
- 1936–1941: River Falls State

Basketball
- 1937–1942: River Falls State
- 1947–1959: Tennessee

Head coaching record
- Overall: 28–17–4 (football); 208–163 (basketball)

Accomplishments and honors

Championships
- Football; 1 NTAC (1935); 1 WSTCC Northern Division (1938)

Awards
- Basketball; First-team All-American—Helms (1934)

Emmett Preston Lowery Jr. (November 11, 1911 – December 19, 1975) was an American football and basketball coach. An Indiana native, he was a protege of Ward Lambert and college teammate of John Wooden. He also played football for Noble Kizer, winning a Big Ten title (1932). He served as the head football coach at Mankato State Teachers College—now known as Minnesota State University, Mankato—in 1935 and at River Falls State Teachers College—now known as the University of Wisconsin–River Falls–from 1936 to 1941, compiling a career college football coaching record of 28–17–4.

In 1947, he was hired by athletic director Robert Neyland to take over head basketball coaching duties at the University of Tennessee in Knoxville, Tennessee, a position he held until 1959.

== Head coaching record ==
=== Football ===
Year	Team	Overall	Conference	Standing	Bowl/playoffs
Mankato State Indians (Northern Teachers Athletic Conference) (1935)
1935	Mankato State	5–2	4–0	T–1st	
Mankato State:		5–2	4–0		
River Falls State Falcons (Wisconsin State Teachers College Conference) (1936–1941)
1936	River Falls State	4–2–1	1–2–1	4th (Northern)	
1937	River Falls State	4–2–2	1–2–1	T–3rd (Northern)	
1938	River Falls State	6–1	4–0	1st (Northern)	
1939	River Falls State	3–4	1–3	5th (Northern)	
1940	River Falls State	4–3	2–2	3rd (Northern)	
1941	River Falls State	2–3–2	1–2–1	4th (Northern)	
River Falls State:		23–15–4	10–11–3		
Total:		28–17–4			
National championship Conference title Conference division title or championship game berth

=== Basketball ===
Record table
Season	Team	Overall	Conference	Standing	Postseason
River Falls State Falcons (Wisconsin State Teachers College Conference) (1936–1942)
1936–37	River Falls State	9–6			
1937–38	River Falls State	8–7			
1938–39	River Falls State	7–8			
1939–40	River Falls State	6–8			
1940–41	River Falls State	6–10			
1941–42	River Falls State	3–14			
River Falls State:		39–53			
Tennessee Volunteers (Southeastern Conference) (1947–1958)
1947–48	Tennessee	20–5	10–2	3rd	
1948–49	Tennessee	19–7	8–3	3rd	
1949–50	Tennessee	15–11	5–6	7th	
1950–51	Tennessee	10–13	5–9	T–10th	
1951–52	Tennessee	13–9	7–7	T–6th	
1952–53	Tennessee	13–8	7–6	4th	
1953–54	Tennessee	11–12	7–7	T–6th	
1954–55	Tennessee	15–7	8–6	4th	
1955–56	Tennessee	10–14	6–8	T–6th	
1956–57	Tennessee	13–9	5–9	9th	
1957–58	Tennessee	16–7	8–6	T–5th	
1958–59	Tennessee	14–8	8–6	T–5th	
Tennessee:		169–110	84–75		
Total:		208–163			
