= Bob Raczek =

American sports coach (1938–2013)

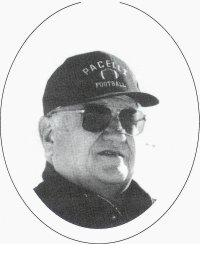
- Raczek patrols the field during one of his practices.

Biographical details
- Born: March 4, 1938; Knowlton, Wisconsin, US
- Died: July 28, 2013 (aged 75)
- Education: Wisconsin–Stout

Coaching career (HC unless noted)
- 1962–1965: Tri-County Area HS (WI)
- 1966–2013: Pacelli HS (WI)

Head coaching record
- Overall: 310–147–2

Accomplishments and honors

Championships
- 2 WISAA (1986, 1995); 1 WIAA (2005)

Awards
- District Coach of the Year (1 time); Conference Coach of the Year (8 times)

Robert F. Raczek (March 4, 1938 – July 23, 2013) was an American high school football coach. One of the most successful coaches in the history of high school football in the state of Wisconsin, he was the head football coach at Pacelli High School in Stevens Point, Wisconsin from 1966 to 2013, leading them to three state championships in 1986, 1995, and 2005. Raczek won numerous awards in coaching and was the third-most successful coach in Wisconsin High School football history.

== Early life ==
Raczek was born and raised in the farming community of Knowlton, Wisconsin. Raczek grew up surrounded by labor and hard work, which would then dissolve from hard farm work, into hard football practices. Raczek loved football, and he played high school football at Mosinee, where he also excelled in other sports such as volleyball, track, and wrestling. Raczek then attended the University of Wisconsin–Stout, where he played football, and was also an assistant coach. He graduated from Wisconsin–Stout in 1962, and went on to pursue a teaching career. However, football was not far behind. Raczek soon married, and is still currently married to his wife, Pat. Together, they had three sons and a daughter: Mary Ellen, Steve, Mark, and Matt Both Steve and Mark played under their father at Pacelli, and both were recognized in the conference and the state as great football players and wrestlers.

Raczek found a job at Tri County-Plainfield high school, where he was teaching technical education, physical education, and was head of the maintenance department. Raczek first took up the head coaching spot for Tri-County in 1962, where he finished with a 0–7 record. He coached for three more years, when he was offered a job at Stevens Point Pacelli High School (Wisconsin) in Stevens Point. Raczek accepted.

== Playing career ==
=== High school ===
Raczek attended the Mosinee high school, where there he played football and other sports. Raczek loved the game, and grew to understand what makes football so great. Raczek currently lives around Mosinee, so he is still in touch with his roots. Raczek recalled, "I made lifelong friendships from coaching this great game of football and to have worked with so many great coaches and players." Raczek then moved onto the University of Wisconsin–Stout, where he learned about different sciences, and football.

=== UW–Stout ===
Raczek left Mosinee High School, and headed for northern Wisconsin to the University of Wisconsin–Stout. There, Raczek pursued a Bachelor of Science degree, and wanted to teach.

As a student of UW–Stout, Raczek participated in numerous sports, such as wrestling, volleyball, track, and of course football. He learned what the college life of football was really about, and how much more different it is from the high school level. As a student, Raczek received an assistant coaching job for the football team. So, in the 1961-62 football season, Raczek was assistant coach of the UW–Stout football team. He learned terminology and plays that he would later transform into the plays he had for the Pacelli Cardinals.

Raczek graduated from the university in 1962, then later he was offered a job to teach and coach at the Plainfield-Tri County High School. Raczek accepted, and his head coaching duties began.

== Head coaching career ==
=== Tri County Penguins ===
Fall is a time for football, and Raczek knew it. He had played football and helped coach since his early days as a child, and not he had the chance to be the head coach of a real football team. In the fall of 1962, Raczek came to Plainfield-Tri County as the head football coach, and the tech-ed teacher. He taught in both football, and tech-ed for four years at the high school before pursuing new locations to teach and coach.

Racek had started his coaching career with University of Wisconsin–Stout as an assistant coach in 1961. He had played for them as well, and attended the school, so he knew the system. Raczek was a huge fan of the running game, and would later pass that onto his players in the high school level. Raczek coached for UW–Stout for only one year, leaving to go to Plainfield.

As the head football coach for Plainfield-Tri County, his records did not live up to what he is known for today. In the four years that he coached for them, he had two winning seasons. His first finished a record of 0–7. His second season finished 3–4. In two years, Raczek was 3-11. He did not give up though, and neither did the school. His third season he finished a good 6–2. His fourth and final season with Plainfield-Tri County he finished 5–3. Raczek understood the high school level of football, and then went on to Pacelli High School to teach his new ideas, that would lead him to three state titles and 310 career wins.

=== Pacelli Cardinals (football) ===
Bob Raczek assumed head coaching for the football team of Pacelli High School in 1967, where his hard-working attitude would shape the school into a very notable high school. Pacelli High School is a private school, with not a lot of funding into the athletic department, so Raczek made do with what he had at the time. The Cardinals finished the 1967 season with a record of 4–5, finishing in sixth place in the conference. Not only was Raczek the head football coach, he later assumed the coaching spots for wrestling, track, and hockey, as well as teach technical education and physical education. The next year, the Cardinals finished the same as the previous, a 4–5 record placing sixth in the conference.

For the next two years, the team suffered losing records of 1-7-1 1969 and 2-7 1970. But in 1971 the Cardinals' football team had a winning record for the first time since 1965. They finished the season with a 9–1 record, placing first in the conference. The following season would be Pacelli's best season in their history of having a football team. The team reached the state championship as part of the Wisconsin Independent Schools Athletic Association (WISAA). The championship game ended with the Cardinals losing to Milwaukee Pius XI by the final score of 10–0.

Raczek gave the Cardinals non-losing records 12 of the next 13 seasons. In 1986, the Cardinals made it back to the WISAA state championship game, this time they would face off against Waukesha Catholic Memorial. The championship game was played at Pacelli's homefield, Goerke Field (the same location where the University of Wisconsin–Stevens Point football team plays). Pacelli defeated Waukesha Catholic Memorial by a final score of 13–3, capping a perfect season at 13–0. The Cardinals would again see the championship lights in 1989 at Camp Randall Stadium in Madison but would fall short, losing to Watertown Northwestern Prep, 44-20 and again in 1992, falling to Marshfield Columbus 28–10.

In 1995, the Cardinals set numerous school records that year in rushing, sacks, and tackles. The Cardinals made it to the WISAA Division 3 championship game where they defeated Manitowoc Lutheran, 28–0. The season ended with a perfect 12–0 record, (the last Pacelli football team to go undefeated) and only allowed 77 points all season (the 1986 Cardinals beat them by allowing only 55 points). The 1995 Cardinals also scored 458 points. The following year, the Cardinals made it back to the state championship game but lost the game to conference rival Marshfield Columbus, 42–6. The 1998 team would fall to Manitowoc Roncalli 27–7 in the state title game and then to Eau Claire Regis 19–6 in the 1999 championship game, the final season of WISAA.

In 2000, the Cardinals moved into the Wisconsin Interscholastic Athletic Association (WIAA). The 2005 Cardinals managed to find a way into the state championship, being a part of Division 7. Going into the playoffs, the Cardinals were not a top seed, but defeated all of their opponents leading to the title game (except Hilbert, who lost to Pacelli by a score of 7-0). The Cardinals played the Gilman Pirates, and it would be Bob Raczek's 300th career win. The Cardinals defeated Gilman 44–20, giving Raczek his third state title. With the 300 wins, Raczek joined Wisconsin football coaches Bob Hyland and Dick Basham as the only coaches in state history to reach more than 300 wins.

In 2006, the Cardinals went 9-0 during the regular season and entered the playoffs as a No. 1 seed, and then won their first round contest. However, they lost in the second round to conference foe Shiocton Chiefs, who Pacelli had beaten earlier that season. Bob Razcek's record currently stands at 332-150-2.

=== Championships ===
Raczek received state titles in WISAA in 1986 and 1995. He won one in 2005 as part of the WIAA in Division 7, also marking his 300th career win. Bob Raczek went to the state title game nine times, winning three (3-6). His conference championship record is much better, winning the old Central Wisconsin Catholic Conference (CWCC) title 10 times (1971 1972 1974 1976 1978 1981 1986 1987 1994 1995), and winning the new Central Wisconsin Conference-Large (CWC-L) two times, 2001 and 2006. Bob Raczek is known for greatness, and in teaching his players the values of life, on and off the football field.

== Cancer ==
The shocking news came to the Raczek family in 2004 that Bob Raczek has been diagnosed with cancer. Doctors did not know whether it would be life-threatening, and offered Raczek chemotherapy. Raczek had a hard time telling his players during a practice that season, and the players did not take it too well. Many people of the school and community feared that 2004 would be Raczek's last season coaching football. The legendary coach had imprinted his image in the hearts of thousands of people throughout Wisconsin, and it would be painful to see a great coach of that magnitude to retire under those circumstances, as did the great Vince Lombardi.

Raczek however overcame the pains, and still managed to coach the following season. Raczek coached his final season in 2012 before succumbing to colon cancer on July 28, 2013.

== Legacy ==
=== Notable rivalries ===
Bob Raczek is known for Pacelli football and the high school.

==== Marshfield Columbus ====
The classic rivalry in Pacelli football history has always been against Marshfield Columbus Catholic High School in the old Central Wisconsin Catholic Conference. The game often determined the champion of the conference. Marshfield Columbus holds a 29-17-1 advantage in the series, ranging from 1957 to 1999. Pacelli has always struggled against Marshfield Columbus (even in Pacelli's dominant 1986 season, Pacelli only won with a score of 3-0 over Marshfield Columbus).

=== Eau Claire Regis ===
Like the classic rivalry between Marshfield Columbus, Eau Claire Regis has had great games against Pacelli. The rivalry was as good, ranging from 1961 to 1999. In those years, Pacelli has had the upper hand, with a record of 25–18. However, in recent years the rivalry has changed, seeing Regis defeat Pacelli in some critical games. Although the two teams are no longer in the same conference, they met in 2002 and 2003, both games being in the WIAA playoffs. In 2002, the Cardinals went 8–1 in the regular season, and fared well in the playoffs. However, in the semifinals Regis edged Pacelli in a close 21-14 contest, ending a great season for the Cardinals. The following year, the two teams met again, this time it was all Regis, defeating the Cardinals 24–0. The rivalry between the two schools had died down for a little bit since moving to separate conferences, but the playoff games have helped renew the rivalry once again.

==== La Crosse Aquinas ====
The Cardinals also had their share of tough battles with La Crosse Aquinas, another former member of the CWCC. Pacelli has played Aquinas 45 times, starting in 1961, where in their first meeting Aquinas dominated the game winning 39–6. Aquinas holds a 25-20 edge in the series with Pacelli, though the Cardinals have dominated the series in recent years as the teams have continued to play non-conference games against one another. Bob Raczek always seems to select Aquinas as the season opener, to get a feeling of pride and confidence in not only beating, but playing Aquinas. The rivalry died down a little in the early 2000s, once Pacelli and Aquinas separated from the CWCC conference. For the start of the 2007 regular season, Pacelli will play against Aquinas in Stevens Point.

=== Honors ===
- In 1999, Raczek was inducted into the Stevens Point Pacelli Athletic Hall of Fame.
- In 2000, Raczek was inducted into the Wisconsin Football Coaches Association Hall of Fame.
- Raczek was named District Coach of the Year in 2006
- Raczek was named All Conference coach 8 times.
- Raczek has won three state titles, and been to nine total. He won in 1986, 1995, and 2005.
- Along with other notable coaches of Wisconsin such as Bob Hyland and Dick Basham, Raczek earned his 300th career victory at the state championship game against the Gilman Pirates in the 2005 WIAA Division 7 title game.
- Raczek has 310 wins, third to only Hyland (Fond du Lac St. Mary Spring) and Basham (Milwaukee Marquette) who both have 318 wins.
- Raczek's image has been painted on a mural in Stevens Point, along with other historical figures that helped make the city of Stevens Point what it is today.
- Raczek was named as the Green Bay Packers coach of the week in 2001.
- On August 2, 2008 the Pacelli High School Football Field was dedicated and formally named the Bob Raczek Football Field. Family, friends, players-both current and former, city officials, school officials, and community members attended the event to honor him.
