= Isthmus Bowl =

NCAA Division III football bowl game

Culver's Isthmus Bowl
- Culver’s Isthmus Bowl
- Stadium: Bank of Sun Prairie Stadium
- Location: Sun Prairie, Wisconsin
- Operated: 2021–present
- Conference tie-ins: WIAC (2021–present); CCIW (2021–present)
- Website: isthmusbowl.com

Sponsors
- Culver's 2021–present

The Isthmus Bowl is an annual NCAA Division III post-season college football bowl game sponsored by Culver's and established in 2021 by the Wisconsin Intercollegiate Athletic Conference (WIAC) and the College Conference of Illinois and Wisconsin (CCIW). The team that places highest in each conference's standings and does not qualify for the NCAA Division III playoffs is typically chosen to represent their conference. The game is played at Bank of Sun Prairie Stadium in Sun Prairie, Wisconsin.

The inaugural game was held on Saturday, November 20, 2021, at Verona Area High School (Verona, Wisconsin) with Wisconsin–River Falls defeating Washington University 48–27.

== Game results ==
Season	Champion	Runner–up	Score	Location	Source
2021	Wisconsin–River Falls	Washington University	48–27	Verona Area High School (Verona, Wisconsin)	
2022	Wisconsin–River Falls	Washington University	31–24	Bank of Sun Prairie Stadium (Sun Prairie, Wisconsin)	
2023	Wisconsin–Platteville	Augustana (IL)	36–10	Bank of Sun Prairie Stadium (Sun Prairie, Wisconsin)	
2024	Wheaton (IL)	Wisconsin–Stout	35–32	Bank of Sun Prairie Stadium (Sun Prairie, Wisconsin)	
2025	Wisconsin–Stout	Washington University	31–23	Bank of Sun Prairie Stadium (Sun Prairie, Wisconsin)	
2026	Wisconsin–River Falls	Illinois Wesleyan	55–24	Bank of Sun Prairie Stadium (Sun Prairie, Wisconsin)	

== Appearances by team ==
This list is for all–time appearances in the Culver's Isthmus Bowl since its inception in 2021.

Rank	Team	Appearances	Record	Last
1	Wisconsin–River Falls	3	3–0	2026
2	Washington University	3	0–3	2025
3	Wisconsin–Stout	2	1–1	2025
4	Wheaton (IL)	1	1–0	2024
5	Wisconsin–Platteville	1	1–0	2023
6	Illinois Wesleyan	1	0–1	2026
7	Augustana (IL)	1	0–1	2023
