= Gary Inskeep =

American gridiron football player (born 1947)

Profile
- Position: Defensive end

Personal information
- Born: March 31, 1947 (age 79); Lonaconing, Maryland, U.S.
- Listed height: 6 ft 4 in (1.93 m)
- Listed weight: 258 lb (117 kg)

Career information
- College: Stout State

Career history
- 1970: Toronto Argonauts
- 1971–1973: Hamilton Tiger-Cats

Awards and highlights
- Grey Cup champion (1972)

Gary Inskeep (born March 31, 1947) is an American former professional Canadian football player who played with the Toronto Argonauts and Hamilton Tiger-Cats. He won the Grey Cup with Hamilton in 1972. Inskeep played college football at the University of Wisconsin-Stout.
