= Reggie Holmes (Canadian football) =

American gridiron football player (born 1945)

No. 27, 44
- Position: Defensive back

Personal information
- Born: September 13, 1945 (age 81); Macon, Mississippi, U.S.
- Listed height: 6 ft 1 in (1.85 m)
- Listed weight: 190 lb (86 kg)

Career information
- High school: Alliance (Alliance, Ohio)
- College: Stout State (1967–1970)
- NFL draft: 1971: 12th round, 310th overall pick

Career history
- 1971: Minnesota Vikings*
- 1971–1972: Calgary Stampeders
- 1973: Minnesota Vikings*
- 1974: Detroit Wheels
- 1974: Detroit Lions*
- * Offseason or practice squad member only

Awards and highlights
- Grey Cup champion (1971)

Reggie Holmes (born September 13, 1945) is an American former professional football player who played for the Calgary Stampeders of the Canadian Football League. He won the Grey Cup with Calgary in 1971. Holmes later played one season for the Detroit Wheels of the World Football League. He played college football for the Stout State Blue Devils.

== Early life and college ==
Reggie Holmes was born on September 13, 1945, in Macon, Mississippi. He attended Alliance High School in Alliance, Ohio.

He was a member of the Stout State Blue Devils football team from 1967 to 1970.

== Professional career ==
Holmes was selected by the Minnesota Vikings in the 12th round, with the 310th overall pick, of the 1971 NFL draft. He signed with the Vikings on March 2, 1971. However, he was released later in 1971.

He played in one regular season game for the Calgary Stampeders of the Canadian Football League in 1971. In the 59th Grey Cup on November 28, 1971, Holmes recovered the infamous fourth quarter fumble by Toronto Argonauts running back Leon McQuay as Calgary later won the game. He played in 12 games during the 1972 season, recording one interception, 32 punt returns for 175 yards, and four kickoff returns for 81 yards.

Holmes was signed by the Vikings again in 1973 but was later released.

He played for the Detroit Wheels of the World Football League in 1974 and made one interception.

Holmes was then signed by the Detroit Lions of the NFL in 1974. However, he was released on September 9, 1974, before the start of the season.
