= Tony Beckham =

American football player (born 1978)

No. 24, 41
- Position: Cornerback

Personal information
- Born: October 1, 1978 (age 48); Gainesville, Florida, U.S.
- Listed height: 6 ft 1 in (1.85 m)
- Listed weight: 187 lb (85 kg)

Career information
- High school: Forest (Ocala, Florida)
- College: Wisconsin–Stout
- NFL draft: 2002: 4th round, 115th overall pick

Career history
- Tennessee Titans (2002–2005); Minnesota Vikings (2006)*; Detroit Lions (2007)
- * Offseason or practice squad member only

Awards and highlights
- 2× All-American (2000-2001); 3× All-WIAC (1999-2001); UW-Stout Athletic Hall of Fame Inductee (2011); WIAC All Bicentennial Team; Division III 2000's All Decade Team

Career NFL statistics
- Total tackles: 62
- Fumble recoveries: 1
- Pass deflections: 10
- Interceptions: 1
- Stats at Pro Football Reference

Antonio Dwight Beckham (born October 1, 1978) is an American former professional football player who was a cornerback in the National Football League (NFL). He was selected by the Tennessee Titans in the fourth round of the 2002 NFL draft. He played college football for the Wisconsin–Stout Blue Devils.

Beckham also played for the Detroit Lions.

== Personal life ==
On January 14, 2019, Beckham found a 48-year-old man outside his house in Wellington, Florida allegedly looking into his daughter's window with a hand down his pants. Beckham then chased the man down, tackled him, and held the alleged "peeping tom" until police arrived.
