= Wisconsin–Stout Blue Devils football =

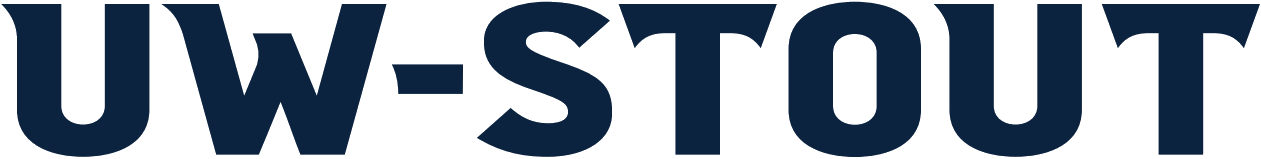
- First season: 1911; 115 years ago
- Athletic director: Duey Naatz
- Head coach: Clayt Birmingham; 15th season, 66–85 (.437)
- Location: Menomonie, Wisconsin
- Stadium: Don and Nona Williams Stadium (capacity: 4,500)
- NCAA division: Division III
- Conference: WIAC
- Colors: Navy and white
- All-time record: 348–533–33 (.399)
- Playoff record: 0–1 (.000)
- Bowl record: 1–1 (.500)

Conference championships
- WIAC: 5 (1921, 1941, 1949, 1965, 2000)
- Rivalries: Wisconsin–Eau Claire Blugolds
- Website: stoutbluedevils.com/football

The Wisconsin–Stout Blue Devils football program is the intercollegiate American football team for the University of Wisconsin–Stout located in the U.S. state of Wisconsin. The team competes at the NCAA Division III level as a member of the Wisconsin Intercollegiate Athletic Conference (WIAC). The Blue Devils play home games at Don and Nona Williams Stadium in Menomonie, Wisconsin. The stadium opened in 2001 and seats 4,500 people. The team's head coach is Clayt Birmingham, who has served in that position in 2010.

== Head coaches ==
Coach	Tenure	Record
No coach—club sport	1911	1–1
Earl Quigley	1912–1914	7–8
Parks Bailey	1915–1916	1–7
Student coaches	1917	2–2
No team	1918	
George F. Miller	1919–1927	20–27–6
Sylvester E. Paulus	1928–1929	2–10–2
Earl Burbridge	1930–1934	6–26–1
Mush Crawford	1935–1937	1–17–2
Ray C. Johnson	1938–1947	15–29–8
Tony Storti	1948–1951	20–9–2
Jack Wink	1952–1955	6–23–3
Joe Gerlach	1956–1957	4–11–1
Bob Bostwick	1958–1962	12–25–3
Max Sparger	1962–1969	22–38–3
Sten Pierce	1970–1976	19–50
Lyle Eidsness	1977–1979	15–15
Bob Kamish	1980–1985	28–36–1
Rich Lawrence	1986–1992	24–46–1
Ed Meierkort	1993–2003	55–55
Todd Strop	2004–2006	14–15
Duey Naatz	2007–2009	17–13
Clayt Birmingham	2010–present	66–85

== Championships ==
=== Conference championships ===
Wisconsin–Stout has won the Wisconsin Intercollegiate Athletic Conference (WIAC) championship 5 times.

Year	Coach	Overall record	WIAC record
1921	George F. Miller	5–0–2	3–0
1941†	Ray C. Johnson	5–2	3–1
1949†	Tony Storti	6–2	4–2
1965	Max Sparger	7–1–1	6–0
2000	Ed Meierkort	10–1	7–0

† Co-champions

=== Undefeated regular seasons ===
Wisconsin–Stout has completed the regular season undefeated twice, once in 1921, and again in 2000 before losing in the playoffs.

Year	Coach	Regular season record	Final record
1921	George F. Miller	5–0–2	5–0–2
2000	Ed Meierkort	10–0	10–1

== Postseason ==
=== NCAA Division III playoffs ===
Year	Round	Opponent	Result	Record
2000	First Round	Saint John's (MN)	L 19–26	10–1

=== Bowl games ===
Year	Bowl	Coach	Opponent	Result	Record
2024	Isthmus Bowl	Clayt Birmingham	Wheaton (IL)	L 32–35	6–5
2025	Isthmus Bowl	Clayt Birmingham	Washington University	W 31–23	6–5

== Ranked teams ==
Starting in 1999 the American Football Coaches Association (AFCA) began publishing rankings for Division III football. In 2003, D3football.com started publishing its own rankings for Division III football. Since the inception of both polls, Wisconsin–Stout has been ranked one time in the AFCA Coaches Poll and has never been ranked in the D3football.com poll to end the season. Additionally, while not being ranked in the Top 25 to end the season, the Blue Devils have received votes (RV) three times in the AFCA Coaches Poll, and three times in the D3football.com poll.

Year	D3	AFCA	Record
2000	N/A	9	10–1
2001	N/A	RV	6–3
2002	N/A	RV	7–3
2009	RV	RV	8–2
2024	RV	NR	6–5
2025	RV	NR	6–5

== Border Battle ==
From 1984 to 2000 the Hubert H. Humphrey Metrodome, home to the Minnesota Vikings and Minnesota Golden Gophers, hosted games in November between WIAC teams and Northern Sun Intercollegiate Conference (NSIC) teams at the NCAA Division II level in what came to be known as the "Border Battle". The Blue Devils played at the Metrodome six times, and had a 3–3 record.

Date	Opponent	Result
November 18, 1984	Northern State	W 24–23
November 21, 1987	Bemidji State	W 45–6
November 12, 1994	Southwest Minnesota State	L 14–35
November 17, 1996	Winona State	W 50–43
November 16, 1997	Southwest Minnesota State	L 21–30
November 14, 1999	Southwest Minnesota State	L 23–43
November 11, 2000	Minnesota Duluth	W 17–15

== Notable players ==
=== NFL draftees ===
Year	Round	Pick	Overall	Player	Team	Position
1967	7	24	183	Dick Erickson	Kansas City Chiefs	C
1970	13	13	325	Gary Inskeep	New York Giants	T
1971	12	24	310	Reggie Holmes	Minnesota Vikings	DB
2002	4	17	115	Tony Beckham	Tennessee Titans	DB

=== Other former players ===
- Frank Haege
- Jeff Hazuga
- Bob McRoberts
- Bob Raczek
- Dustin Tervelt
