= Sewing with Nancy =

Public television show about sewing

- Starring: Nancy Zieman
- Country of origin: United States
- Original language: English

Production
- Running time: Half-hour
- Production company: Wisconsin Public Television

Original release
- Network: Syndication
- Release: September 1, 1982 – November 13, 2017

Sewing with Nancy is an American television show about sewing, hosted by Nancy Zieman. It made its debut on the now-defunct Satellite Program Network (SPN, later Tempo Television) in September 1982. On September 1, 1982, PBS began airing the series, which was distributed by National Educational Telecommunications Association. As of 2011, the show aired on 89% of Public Television stations in the United States. It was the longest-running sewing series in the history of North American television.

Sewing with Nancy was co-produced by Wisconsin Public Television at Vilas Hall on the University of Wisconsin campus in Madison. Zieman had Bell's palsy, a one-sided facial nerve paralysis, and talked about the condition on an episode in 2011. On September 5, 2017, Zieman announced her retirement due to cancer; she died just over two months later, the day after the final episode was broadcast. Older episodes continue to be broadcast on PBS under the name The Best of Sewing with Nancy.

== Episodes ==
No. in season	Title	Original release date
Season 23
2301	"12 Easy Sew Bags - Part 1"	12 September 2009
Nancy reviews 4 different bag designs and provides tips and tricks for embellishing your bags.
2302	"12 Easy Sew Bags - Part 2"	19 September 2009
Nancy reviews additional "glam" bag designs and provides tips and tricks for using O-rings and accents with straps.
2303	"12 Easy Sew Bags - Part 3"	26 September 2009
Nancy shows her final four bag options, adjustable straps, positioning embroidery, and creating organizers.
2304	"Single Layer Jacket Sensations"	3 October 2009
Nancy uses unique fabrics and shares tips to adjust existing jacket patterns to make single layer jackets.
2305	"Appli-Curves - Part 1"	10 October 2009
Nancy's guest, Elaine Waldschmitt, gives tips on creating curbed quilt blocks.
2306	"Appli-Curves - Part 2"	17 October 2009
Nancy's guest, Elaine Waldschmitt, gives tips and demonstrates the New York Beauty Blocks.
2307	"Versatile Ombre Quilting - Part 1"	24 October 2009
Nancy focuses on using ombre fabrics to create quilts with gradations.
2308	"Versatile Ombre Quilting - Part 2"	31 October 2009
Nancy's guest, Natalie Sewell, applies ombre patterns to landscape quilting techniques.
2309	"Versatile Ombre Quilting - Part 3"	7 November 2009
Nancy looks at using ombre designs in super-sized Asian influence quilts and an Amish Ombre Shadow quilt.
2310	"Top 12 Embroidery Tips - Part 1"	14 November 2009
Nancy's guest, Kate Bashynski, provides tips to save time, energy, and money on embroidery projects.
2311	"Top 12 Embroidery Tips - Part 2"	21 November 2009
Nancy's guest, Kate Bashynski, continue to provide their embroidery tips.
2312	"Sew-Green Makeovers - Part 1"	19 December 2009
Nancy's guest, Mary Mulari, focuses on ideas to repurpose and recycle materials for creative new projects.
2313	"Sew-Green Makeovers - Part 2"	26 December 2009
Nancy's guest, Mary Mulari, continues to share "green" projects to transform table clothes and shirts.
2314	"Applique Know How - Part 1"	2 January 2010
Nancy reviews basic applique techniques.
2315	"Applique Know How - Part 2"	9 January 2010
Nancy continues to review basic applique techniques to embellish projects.
2316	"Applique Know How - Part 3"	16 January 2010
Nancy continues to review basic applique techniques including use of buttons and fusible bias tape.
2317	"Magical Serger Techniques - Part 1"	23 January 2010
Nancy's guest, Pam Mahshie, demonstrates a variety of uses for common sergers.
2318	"Magical Serger Techniques - Part 2"	30 January 2010
Nancy's guest, Pam Mahshie, continues to demonstrate a variety of uses for common sergers.
2319	"Cotton Theory Quilting - Reversible Jackets - Part 1"	6 February 2010
Nancy's guest, Betty Cotton, demonstrates how to create a unique reversible quilted jackets.
2320	"Cotton Theory Quilting - Reversible Jackets - Part 2"	13 February 2010
Nancy's guest, Betty Cotton, continues her demonstration of how to create a unique reversible quilted jackets.
2321	"Decorative Stitch Thread Painting - Part 1"	20 February 2010
Nancy's guest, Karen Linduska, shows how to use decorative stitches with her thread painting technique.
2322	"Decorative Stitch Thread Painting - Part 2"	27 February 2010
Nancy's guest, Karen Linduska, continues to how to use decorative stitches with weaving techniques and outline stitches.
2323	"Amish Quilts - Part 1"	27 March 2010
Nancy's guest, Klaudeen Hansen, demonstrates how to create small Amish style quilts.
2324	"Amish Quilts - Part 2"	3 April 2010
Nancy's guest, Klaudeen Hansen, demonstrates how to create a unique Amish postcard quilt.
2325	"Retro Hankies - Part 1"	10 April 2010
Nancy's guest, Amy Barickman, discusses incorporating "hankie art" into a variety of sewing projects.
2326	"Retro Hankies - Part 2"	17 April 2010
Nancy's guest, Amy Barickman, discusses incorporating "hankie art" into a ready-made garments and home decor accents.
