= Wisconsin–River Falls Falcons football =

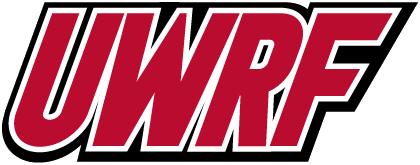
- First season: 1895; 131 years ago
- Athletic director: Crystal Lanning
- Head coach: Jake Wissing (interim); 1st season, 8–3 (.727)
- Location: River Falls, Wisconsin
- Stadium: Ramer Field
- NCAA division: Division III
- Conference: WIAC
- Colors: Red and White
- All-time record: 526–419–48 (.554)
- Playoff record: 6–3 (.667)
- Bowl record: 3–0 (1.000)

NCAA Division III championships
- 2025

Conference championships
- WIAC: 1915, 1916, 1924, 1925, 1926, 1933, 1938, 1947, 1958, 1975, 1976, 1979, 1980, 1984, 1985, 1986, 1987, 1998, 2025
- Website: uwrfsports.com/football

The Wisconsin–River Falls Falcons football program is the intercollegiate American football team for the University of Wisconsin–River Falls located in River Falls, Wisconsin. The team competes at the NCAA Division III level and is a member of the Wisconsin Intercollegiate Athletic Conference (WIAC). The school first fielded a football team in 1895. The Falcons wear red, white, and black. Ramer Field, where the Falcons play their home games, was the host of the Kansas City Chiefs' training camp from 1992 to 2008.

== History ==
=== Mike Farley (1970–1988) ===
The Falcons were most successful under coach Mike Farley (1970–1988), as he led the Falcons to a 117–71–3 record, with eight conference championships. In 1979 Farley coached the falcons to the NAIA National playoffs, the first time a Falcon football team had ever competed at the national level. Farley was named the WIAC Coach of the Year after the 1986 season. In 1979 and 1986 he was named the American Football Coaches Association Region 6 Coach of the Year, and the NAIA District 14 Coach of the Year in 1975, 1979 and 1985. He coached 91 players to All-WIAC honors, with three Falcons earning WIAC Player of the Year. Farley was inducted into the UWRF Athletic Hall of Fame in 1989, the Wisconsin Football Coaches Hall of Fame in 1994, and the Wisconsin Intercollegiate Athletic Conference (WIAC) Hall of Fame on August 4, 2012.

=== John O'Grady (1989–2010) ===
John O'Grady is the longest tenured UWRF coach with 22 seasons. He was a linebacker for the Falcons from 1972 to 1975. He previously coached at Kent State University, the University of Wisconsin–Madison, and Miami University. O'Grady won the conference championship in 1998 and advanced to the NCAA Playoffs twice (1995 and 1996). He had a career record of 105–112–3. O'Grady was named the 1995 WIAC Coach of the Year and was inducted into the Wisconsin Football Coaches Association (WFCA) Hall of Fame on April 5, in 2008.

In 2009 the Falcons finished the season at 3–7 (1–6 in WIAC). In 2010, the Falcons finished the season at 1–9 (1–6 in WIAC).

=== Matt Walker (2011–2025) ===
Matt Walker was previously the head football coach at DePauw University (2006–09) where he compiled a 22–8 overall record. His teams finished 13–7 in the Southern Collegiate Athletic Conference and placed second in the final conference standings in 2007 and 2008. From 2000 to 05 Walker was an assistant coach with DePauw and coached running backs and wide receivers. In 2010, he was an assistant coach at Butler University. Walker was a two-sport athlete (baseball and football) at DePauw (1999). In 2011, the Falcons finished the season at 1–9 (1–6 in WIAC). In 2012, they finished the season 2–8 (2–4 in WIAC) and finished in sixth place.

== Head coaching history ==
Wisconsin–River Falls has had at least 21 head coaches in their history. The head coaches for the seasons 1895–1898, 1900–1901, and 1910 are unknown. No teams were fielded for the 1902–1908 seasons. Additionally no team was fielded in 2020 due to the COVID-19 pandemic.

Coach	Seasons	Term	Wins	Losses	Ties	Win %	Conference titles	Playoff appearances
Warren P. Knowles	1	1899	5	2	1	.688	N/A	N/A
Jesse H. Ames	1	1909	1	2	0	.333	N/A	N/A
E. W. Castle	1	1911	6	1	1	.813	0	N/A
Bert Swenson	9	1912–1920	38	16	8	.677	2	N/A
Herman Hayward	2	1921, 1923	6	6	1	.500	0	N/A
H. G. Anderson	1	1922	3	3	1	.500	0	N/A
Otto Eggebrecht	2	1924	7	0	0	1.000	1	N/A
Ted Cox	2	1925–1926	11	1	1	.885	2	N/A
Basil Stanley	1	1927	5	1	1	.786	0	N/A
Carl Klandrud	5	1928–1932	22	10	2	.676	0	N/A
Osborne Cowles	3	1933–1935	13	6	2	.667	1	N/A
Emmett Lowery	6	1936–1941	23	16	4	.581	1	N/A
Gerald Manion	3	1942–1944	8	6	0	.571	0	N/A
George Schlaugenhauf	7	1945–1951	25	22	7	.528	1	N/A
Phil Belfiori	5	1952–1956	29	9	1	.756	0	N/A
Fran Polsfoot	5	1957–1961	21	20	3	.511	1	N/A
Gwynn Christensen	8	1962–1969	28	38	7	.432	0	0
Mike Farley	19	1970–1988	117	71	3	.620	8	1
John O'Grady	22	1989–2010	105	112	3	.484	1	2
Matt Walker	14	2011–2025	67	80	0	.456	1	1 (2 bowl games)

== Championships ==
=== Conference championships ===
The Falcons won the Wisconsin Intercollegiate Athletic Conference (WIAC) championship 19 times.

Year	Coach	Overall record	WIAC record
1915	Bert Swenson	6–1–1	5–0
1916	Bert Swenson	6–1–1	5–0
1924	Otto Eggebrecht	7–0	4–0
1925	Ted Cox	5–1–1	4–0
1926	Ted Cox	6–0	4–0
1933†	Osborne Cowles	4–1–1	2–1–1
1938†	Emmett Lowery	6–1	4–0
1947†	George Schlaugenhauf	7–1	4–0
1958	Fran Polsfoot	7–2	6–1
1975†	Mike Farley	8–2	7–1
1976†	Mike Farley	7–3	6–2
1979	Mike Farley	9–2	7–1
1980†	Mike Farley	8–2	6–2
1984†	Mike Farley	8–2	7–1
1985	Mike Farley	8–1–1	6–1–1
1986†	Mike Farley	8–2	7–1
1987†	Mike Farley	7–3	6–2
1998†	John O'Grady	7–3	5–2
2025	Matt Walker	14–1	6–1

† Co-champions

=== National championship ===
Wisconsin–River Falls won the 2025 NCAA Division III football championship, defeating North Central (IL) 24–14 in the Stagg Bowl.

Year	Coach	Division	Opponent	Result	Record
2025	Matt Walker	NCAA Division III	North Central (IL)	W 24–14	14–1

== Postseason games ==
=== NCAA Division III playoffs ===
The Falcons have made three appearances in the NCAA Division III playoffs, with a combined record of 6–2.

Year	Round	Opponent	Result	Record
1995	Regionals	Central (IA)	W 10–7	9–3
1995	Quarterfinals	Wisconsin–La Crosse	L 14–28	9–3
1996	Regionals	Wisconsin–La Crosse	L 0–44	9–2
2025	Second Round	Chapman	W 58–7	14–1
2025	Third Round	Saint John's (MN)	W 42–14	14–1
2025	Quarterfinals	Wheaton (IL)	W 46–21	14–1
2025	Semifinals	Johns Hopkins	W 48–41	14–1
2025	Championship	North Central (IL)	W 24–14	14–1

=== NAIA Division I playoffs ===
The Falcons have made one appearance in the NAIA Division I playoffs, with a combined record of 0–1.

Year	Round	Opponent	Result	Record
1979	Quarterfinals	Angelo State (TX)	L 7–31	9–2

=== Bowl games ===
The Falcons have a 3–0 bowl record after participating in the Culver's Isthmus Bowl in 2021, 2022, and 2026.

Year	Bowl	Coach	Opponent	Result	Record
2021	Isthmus Bowl	Matt Walker	Washington University	W 48–27	9–2
2022	Isthmus Bowl	Matt Walker	Washington University	W 31–24	7–4
2026	Isthmus Bowl	Jake Wissing	Illinois Wesleyan	W 55–24	8–3

== Ranked teams ==
Starting in 1999 the American Football Coaches Association (AFCA) began publishing rankings for Division III football. In 2003, D3football.com started publishing its own rankings for Division III football. Since the inception of both polls, Wisconsin–River Falls has been ranked two times in the AFCA Coaches Poll and three times in the D3football.com poll to end the season. Additionally, while not being ranked in the Top 25 to end the season, the Falcons have received votes (RV) three times in the AFCA Coaches Poll and two times in the D3football.com poll.

Year	D3	AFCA	Record
2021	20	22	9–2
2022	RV	RV	7–4
2023	24	RV	7–3
2024	RV	RV	7–3
2025	1	1	14–1

== Border Battle ==
From 1984 to 2000 the Hubert H. Humphrey Metrodome, home to the Minnesota Vikings and Minnesota Golden Gophers, hosted games in November between WIAC teams and Northern Sun Intercollegiate Conference (NSIC) teams at the NCAA Division II level in what came to be known as the "Border Battle". The Falcons played at the Metrodome seven times, and had a 5–2 record.

Date	Opponent	Result
November 18, 1984	Southwest Minnesota State	L 24–35
November 12, 1994	Northern State	W 48–14
November 17, 1996	Minnesota State–Moorhead	W 28–21
November 16, 1997	Northern State	W 31–7
November 14, 1998	Bemidji State	W 45–14
November 13, 1999	Winona State	W 29–20
November 10, 2000	Bemidji State	L 20–23

== Facilities ==
From 1991 to 2009 UWRF was host to the Kansas City Chiefs organization. In 2006 the Chiefs won the UWRF outstanding service award for their ties to the community and dedication and respect to the university. As many as five other National Football League teams used campuses across Wisconsin and Minnesota for training camp, in what was known as the Cheese League.

== Notable former players ==
- John O'Grady
- Owen Schmitt
