= Wisconsin–River Falls Falcons =

- University: University of Wisconsin–River Falls
- Nickname: Falcons
- NCAA: Division III
- Conference: Wisconsin Intercollegiate Athletic Conference
- Athletic director: Crystal Lanning
- Location: River Falls, Wisconsin
- Varsity teams: 20
- Football stadium: Ramer Field
- Basketball arena: Page Arena
- Other venues: Hunt Arena
- Colors: Red and White
- Mascot: Freddy Falcon
- Website: uwrfsports.com
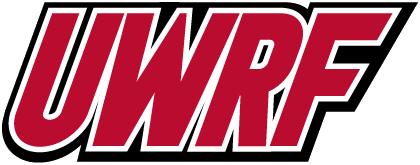

Team NCAA championships
- 7

The University of Wisconsin–River Falls Falcons (or UWRF Falcons) compete as members of the NCAA Division III. The athletic program has men's teams in football, basketball, ice hockey, indoor and outdoor track and field, and cross country. There are women's teams in basketball, ice hockey, indoor and outdoor track and field, cross country, golf, soccer, softball, tennis, and volleyball. The Falcons on-campus facilities include the Falcon Center, which includes Hunt Arena and Page Arena, Ramer Field, and a new complex for both softball and women's soccer. They compete in the Wisconsin Intercollegiate Athletic Conference (WIAC) in all sports. The athletic director is Crystal Lanning. The Falcons team colors are red and white, and the team mascot is named "Freddy Falcon."

== Varsity sports ==
| Men's sports | Women's sports |
|---|---|
| Baseball | Basketball |
| Basketball | Cross country |
| Cross country | Esports |
| Esports | Golf |
| Football | Ice hockey |
| Ice hockey | Lacrosse |
| Soccer | Soccer |
| Track and field | Softball |
| | Tennis |

=== Basketball ===
==== Men's ====
UWRF Falcon men's basketball competes in the Wisconsin Intercollegiate Athletic Conference. They are coached by Jeff Berkhof and home games are played at Page Arena, which opened in Fall of 2017.

==== Women's ====
UWRF Falcon women's basketball began competing in the Wisconsin Intercollegiate Athletic Conference in 1979. They won the WIAC conference championship in 1985, 1988, and 1989. They are currently head coached by Shelby Lyman as of the 2022-2023 season. Their home games are played at the new Page Arena.

=== Football ===
The University of Wisconsin-River Falls football program began in 1894. The Falcons compete in the Wisconsin Intercollegiate Athletic Conference, one of the most competitive Division three conferences in the United States. In the WIAC they have won 19 conference championships (1915, 1916, 1924, 1925, 1926 1933, 1938, 1947, 1958, 1975 1976, 1979, 1980, 1984, 1985 1986, 1987, 1998, 2025). A streak of 19 consecutive losing seasons began in 2001, including a winless 0-10 season in 2013. In 2025, quarterback Kaleb Blaha won the Gagliardi Trophy as the NCAA Division III player of the year, broke Joe Burrow's 2019 record for the most yards in a single season with 6,189, and led the Falcons to their first D-III National Championship in school history.

Ramer Field, where the Falcons play, is the former host of the Kansas City Chiefs training camp (1992–2008). The current head coach is Matt Walker.

=== Ice hockey ===
==== Men's ====
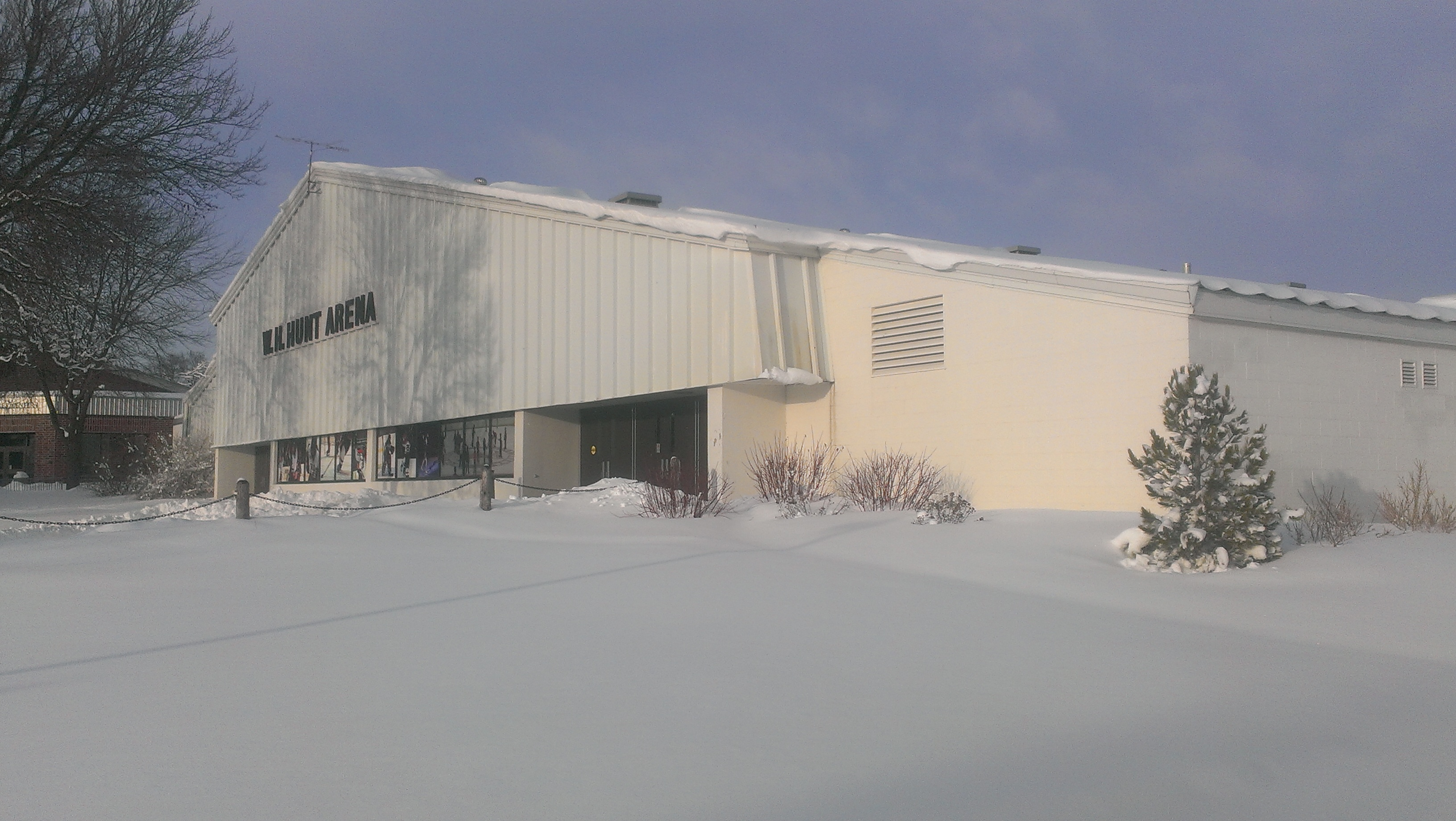
Hunt Arena, men's and women's ice hockey venue

UWRF men's hockey team has won three National Championships (1983, 1988, 1994), three Northern collegiate Hockey Association titles (1988, 1996, 2007), and 14 Wisconsin Intercollegiate Athletic Conference championships (1982–1988, 1999, 2001, 2004, 2005, 2007, 2008, 2010, 2012).

Steve Freeman is the current coach for the Falcons ice hockey team and has been the coach for the past 17 years, the Falcons assistant coach Bob Ritzer is also returning for his 18th year. Freeman has won 305 games with the UWRF Falcons since he started coaching in 1995. The hockey team(s), men and women, play at the W.H. Hunt Arena which was built specifically for the hockey program in 1973. The arena is also used for open skate during the season which is free for UWRF students and only costs a few dollars for the general public.

==== Women's ====
Since the Women's Hockey team was established in 1999, the Falcons have been coached by Joe Cranston. The team has participated in the NCAA playoffs in 2009, 2010, 2011, and 2012. The team won the regular season NCHA title in 2009, 2011, and 2012. They also won the NCHA playoff championships in 2009, 2010, and 2012. The Falcon's play their home hockey games at Hunt Arena.

=== Track and Field ===
==== Men's ====
The UWRF Falcon Men's Track and Field team also competes at a Division III level in the WIAC. The head coach for the men's team is Andy Eggerth.

==== Women's ====
The UWRF Falcon Women's Track and Field team competes at a Division III level in the WIAC. The head coach for the women's team is Andy Eggerth.

=== Cross Country ===
==== Men's ====
The UWRF Falcon Men's Cross Country team also competes at a Division III level in the WIAC. The men's team is coached by Meaghan Koski.

==== Women's ====
The UWRF Falcon Women's Cross Country team competes at a Division III level in the WIAC. The women's team is coached by Meaghan Koski.

=== Softball ===
UWRF Falcon softball competes in the WIAC as a Division III team. The Falcon's have had a women's softball team since 1983. In 2011 and 2012 the Falcons won the WIAC playoff championship.

The current head coach is Amber Dohlman. From 2007 to 2011, former head coach Faye Perkins was the interim dean of the UWRF College of Education and Professional studies. Perkins, as well as the rest of the UWRF softball coaching staff, was named the NFCA Great Lakes Regional Coach Staff of the Year in 2012. On April 12, 2013, Perkins won her 400th game at UWRF after defeating Bethel University

=== Volleyball ===
UWRF Falcon volleyball team competes in the WIAC as a Division III team. The Falcons have had a Women's Volleyball team since 1973.

When at home their games take place at the new Page Arena. The current head coach is Dipen Patel. Prior to Patel, the head coach was Patti Ford.

Patti Ford coached the Falcon Volleyball program from 1992-2021. She led the team to 572 wins and 364 losses along with 4 WIAC Championships. Ford has been the WIAC Coach of the Year three times; in 1995, 1999 and 2002. Ford currently ranks 5th in the WIAC all-time career wins and second among active WIAC coaches. She has coached 55 athletes to the All-WIAC honors, 28 athletes to the AVCA All-Midwest Region, and 14 athletes to the All-American status. Prior to her coaching career at UWRF she earned her undergraduate from Mount Marty College, South Dakota in 1983 in health, physical education and recreation. In 1994 she earned her master's degree at NDSU in education/physical education.

=== Tennis ===
The University of Wisconsin-River Falls women's tennis program competes in the Wisconsin Intercollegiate Athletic Conference. The coach for the women's tennis team is Dan Stumpf Home matches are played on the UWRF outdoor tennis courts.

== National championships ==
To date, the University of Wisconsin–River Falls has won three national championships:

- Men's Ice Hockey (NAIA): 1983
- Men's Ice Hockey (NCAA): 1988, 1994
- Women's Outdoor Track & Field: 2008
- Women's Ice Hockey (NCAA): 2024, 2025, 2026
- Football (NCAA Division III): 2025

== See also ==
- UWRF Softball
