= Bob McRoberts (American football) =

American football player (1924–2012)

Profile
- Position: Halfback

Personal information
- Born: April 28, 1924; Eau Galle, Wisconsin
- Died: March 9, 2012 (aged 87)

Career information
- College: Wisconsin-Stout

Career history
- 1944: Boston Yanks
- Stats at Pro Football Reference

Bob McRoberts (April 28, 1924 – March 9, 2012) was a former halfback in the National Football League. He was a member of the Boston Yanks during the 1944 NFL season.
