= University of Wisconsin–Stout Polytechnic =

Public university in Menomonie, Wisconsin, U.S.

- Former names: Stout Manual Training School (1891–1908); Stout Institute (1908–1955); Stout State College (1955–1965); Stout State University (1965–1971); University of Wisconsin-Stout (1971-2026)
- Type: Public university
- Established: 1891; 135 years ago
- Parent institution: Universities of Wisconsin
- Chancellor: Katherine P. Frank
- Students: 7,061 (fall 2025)
- Undergraduates: 6,227 (fall 2025)
- Postgraduates: 834 (fall 2025)
- Location: Menomonie, Wisconsin, U.S. 44°52′11″N 91°55′40″W
- Campus: Rural (large town), 124 acres (50 ha)
- Colors: (Navy, Cobalt & Cyan)
- Nickname: Blue Devils
- Sporting affiliations: NCAA Division III - WIAC; National Collegiate Gymnastics Association
- Website: www.uwstout.edu

The University of Wisconsin–Stout Polytechnic (also referred to as UW–Stout Polytechnic, UW–Stout or Stout) is a public university in Menomonie, Wisconsin, United States. The polytechnic university of the University of Wisconsin System, it enrolls more than 6,900 students. The school was founded in 1891 and named in honor of its founder, lumber magnate James Huff Stout.

UW–Stout Polytechnic provides focused programs "related to professional careers in industry, technology, home economics, applied art, and the helping professions." UW–Stout Polytechnic offers more than 50 undergraduate majors and 22 graduate majors, including 2 advanced graduate majors and a doctorate.

== History ==
In 1891, James Huff Stout, a lumber magnate who represented Menomonie in the Wisconsin State Senate, founded the "Stout Manual Training School" as a manual training school, the first of several educational enterprises he launched in Menomonie. The Manual Training movement was an educational philosophy that influenced modern vocational education. In the United States, this philosophy was established in the 1870s and used to train engineers, later working its way into public education. Manual training promoted a classical liberal education, but emphasizing practical application such as practical judgment, perception and visual accuracy, and manual dexterity over theory. It was not meant to be used to teach specific trades, but rather to enhance the traditional educational model. Students learned drafting, mechanics, woodworking, metal working, in addition to science, mathematics, language, literature, and history. After the American Civil War, leaders of industry and politics were turning to public education to augment existing apprenticeship programs by incorporating Manual Training philosophy into their curricula.

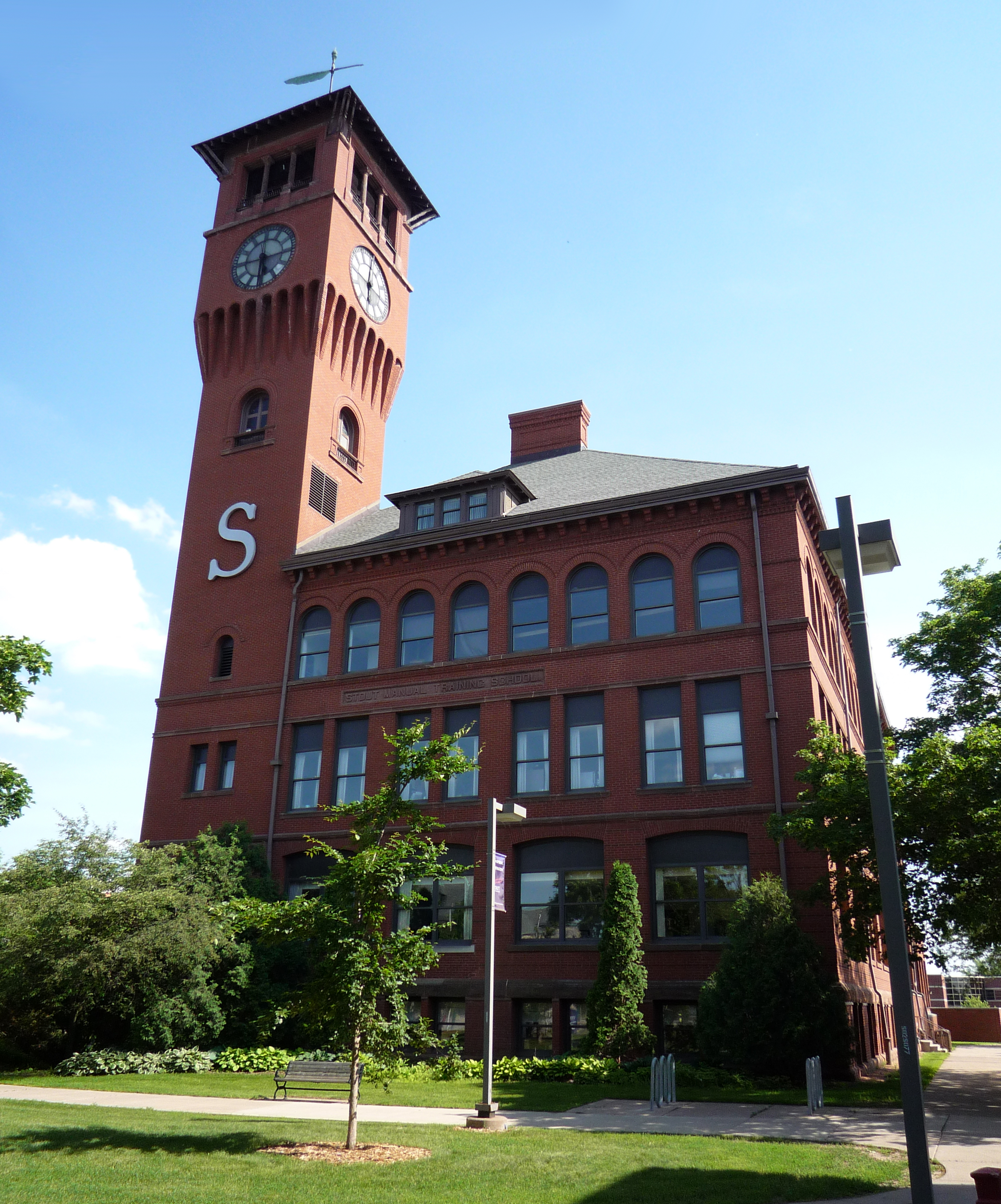
Bowman Hall, the oldest building on campus, opened in 1897

Stout was influenced by the Arts and Crafts Movement, the philosophies of which influenced his own philosophy of education, specifically that making things by hand, through skill and creativity, would provide more thoughtful and creative consumer goods because of the personal satisfaction of the craftsperson. The American interpretation of the Arts and Crafts movement was not in opposition to modern industry. Rather, it embraced creativity and intellectual development as necessary components of the educational model, leading the school to teach classes in drawing, jewelry making, embroidery, and photography.

In addition to the Stout Manual Training School, James Huff Stout established kindergarten classes (1894), a Kindergarten Training School (1899), a School of Physical Culture (1901), training schools for manual training teachers and domestic science teachers (1903), and a Homemaker's School (1907).

In 1908, to simplify and clarify administration, Stout merged his various educational enterprises into the "Stout Institute", which was sold to the state of Wisconsin after Stout's death in 1911. The school was governed by its own board of trustees until 1955, when it became part of the Wisconsin State Colleges system as "Stout State College". The state colleges were all upgraded to university status in 1965, and accordingly Stout State College became "Stout State University". In 1971, after the merger of the former University of Wisconsin and the Wisconsin State Universities, the school became part of the University of Wisconsin System under its present name, the "University of Wisconsin–Stout". In March 2007, UW–Stout was designated "Wisconsin's Polytechnic University" by the UW System Board of Regents. In 2026, The UW System Board of Regents voted to change the name from the University of Wisconsin-Stout to UW-Stout Polytechnic.

== Campus ==
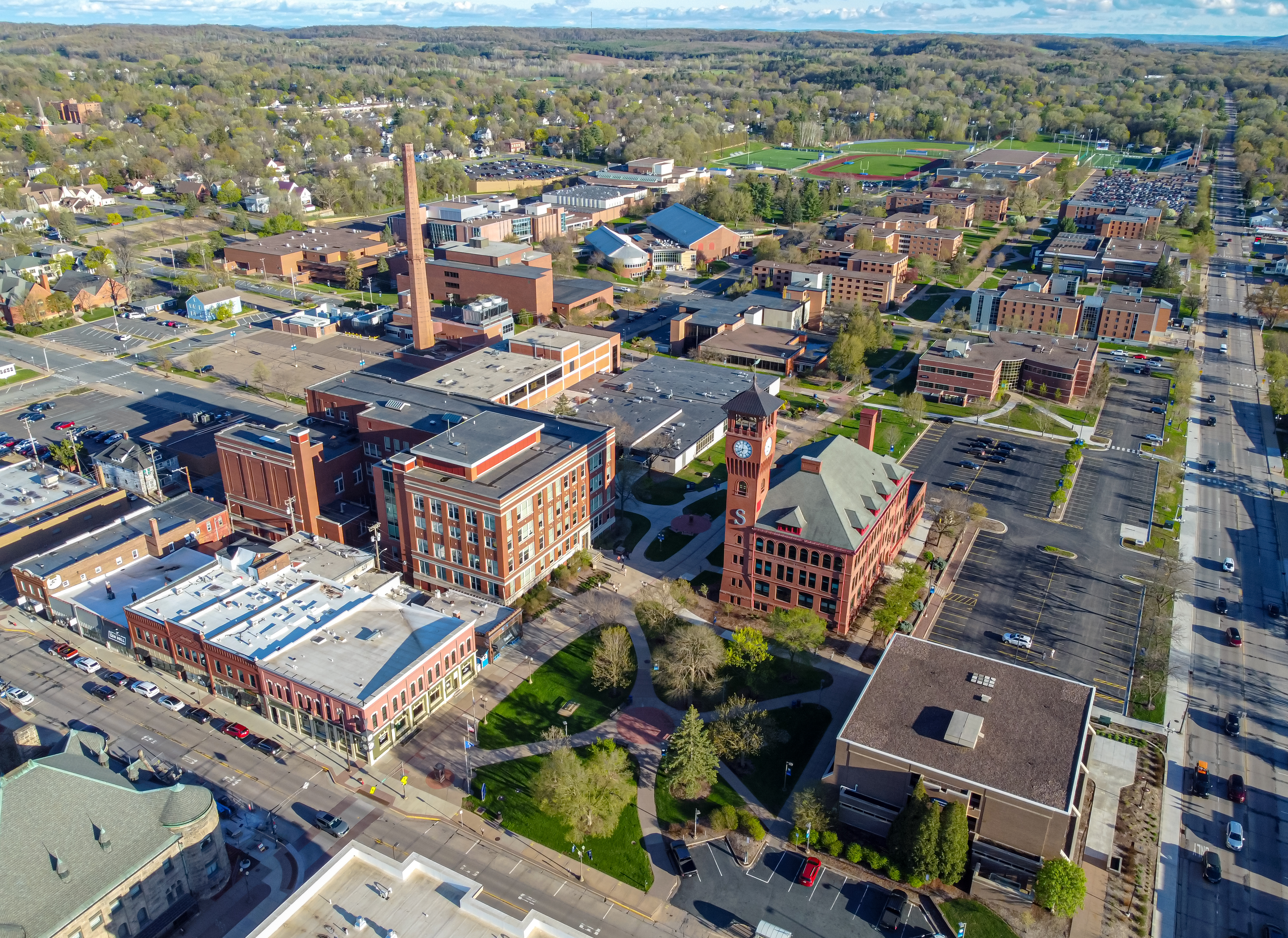
UW–Stout campus

UW–Stout Polytechnic is made up of two parts, a main campus and north campus. The main campus has most classrooms, five of nine residence halls, and three dining facilities, while the north campus is the remaining four residence halls, along with one dining hall and the student health facilities. The campus is 124 acres (50 ha) with 25 major academic and administrative buildings, 9 residence halls, and 245 laboratories.

More than 3,000 students live on campus. All freshmen and sophomores are required to live on campus for their first two academic years. Housing includes traditional dorms and modern suite-styled rooms. There are nine residence halls. All are co-ed.

The Stout Student Association is the student government representing all students at UW–Stout.

== Academics ==
UW–Stout Polytechnic offers more than 50 undergraduate majors and 70 minors, along with 22 graduate degrees. The Graduate School provides oversight for graduate education at the university. UW–Stout Polytechnic offers three terminal degree programs; the Master of Fine Arts (M.F.A.) in Design, the Educational Specialist degree in both School Psychology and Career & Technical Education, and the Doctor of Education (Ed.D.) in Career & Technical Education.

Stout Polytechnic is organized into two colleges: the College of Arts & Human Sciences, which houses the School of Art & Design and the School of Education; and the College of Science, Technology, Engineering, Mathematics & Management, which houses the Robert F. Cervenka School of Engineering and the School of Management.

The Graduate School provides oversight for graduate education at the university.

The English as a Second Language Institute offers year-round English immersion courses to non-native English speakers.

=== Research ===
The university was designated Wisconsin's polytechnic university by the Universities of Wisconsin Board of Regents in the spring of 2007, becoming the first and only polytechnic university in Minnesota or Wisconsin. In 2013, officials from MIT helped open a fab lab on the UW–Stout Polytechnic campus, the only university in Wisconsin with such a facility.

Research centers include:

- Applied Research Center
- Archives & Area Research Center
- Assistive Technology & Assessment Center
- Center for Applied Ethics
- Center for Innovation & Development
- Center for Limnological Research & Rehabilitation
- Center for Nutrition Education
- Center for Sustainable Communities
- Child & Family Study Center
- Cybersecurity Research & Outreach Center
- Emerging Center for Career & Technical Education Excellence
- Fab Lab
- Manufacturing Outreach Center
- Menard Center for the Study of Institutions & Innovation
- Nakatani Teaching & Learning Center
- People Process Culture
- Stout Vocational Rehabilitation Institute
- Weidner Center for Residential Property Management

=== Stout Technology and Research Park ===
Just east of the main campus lies the Stout Technology and Research Park, an area housing facilities and laboratories dedicated to research, high technology, engineering, product development and prototype manufacturing, product testing, experimental and commercial testing, and light manufacturing. Business and industry entities located in the STBP include facilities owned by 3M, Andersen Corporation, and ConAgra Foods.

== Athletics ==
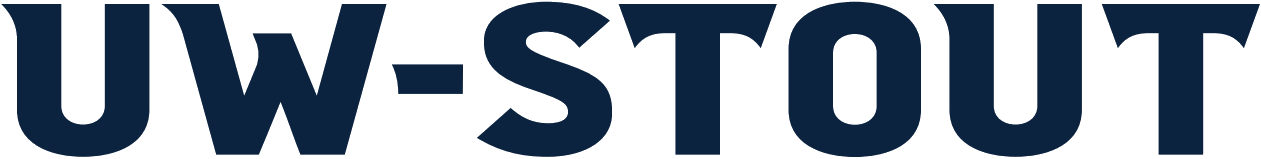
UW–Stout athletics wordmark

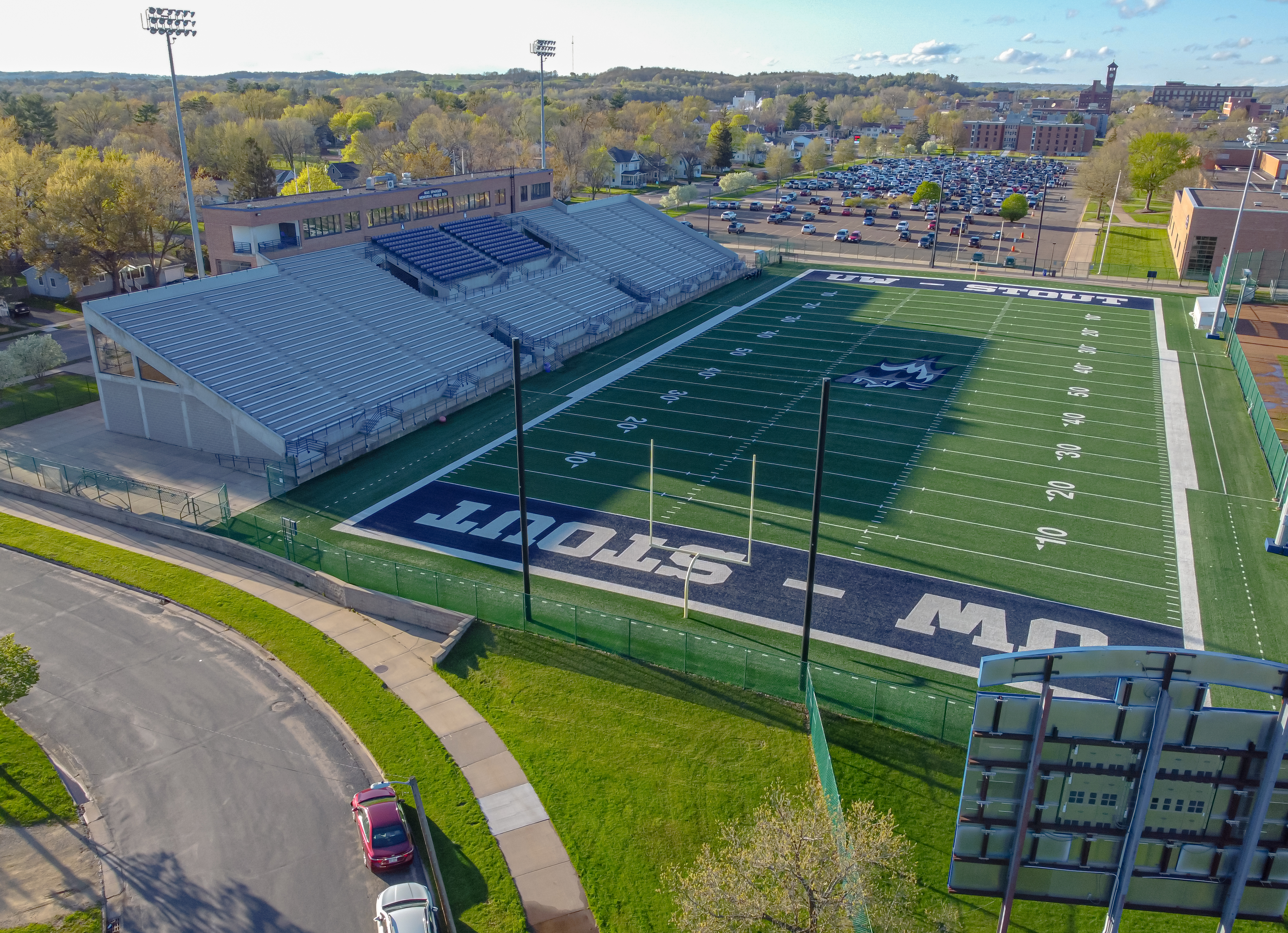
Don and Nona Williams Stadium, UW–Stout's football venue

UW–Stout's athletic varsity teams mascot is the Blue Devils, and the athletic colors are navy blue and white.

The school competes in the WIAC in NCAA Division III (D-III). The women's gymnastics team is affiliated with National Collegiate Gymnastics Association (NCGA).

As a D-III university, student athletes compete without the benefit of athletics aid or scholarships. Men's teams include: baseball, basketball, cross country, football, golf, ice hockey, soccer and track and field. Women's teams include: basketball, cross country, golf, gymnastics, lacrosse, soccer, softball, tennis, track and field and volleyball.

UW–Stout was the first university among the Universities of Wisconsin with a varsity esports program. The Blue Devils compete as members of the National Association of Collegiate Esports (NACE).
