= List of Dickinson State Blue Hawks head football coaches =

The Dickinson State Blue Hawks program is a college football team that represents Dickinson State University in the Dakota Athletic Conference, a part of the NAIA. The team has had 15 head coaches since its first recorded football game in 1925. The former coach is Hank Biesiot who first took the position for the 1976 season. The current coach is Pete Stanton. Stanton was an assistant for 14 years with Biesiot.

== Key ==
Key to symbols in coaches list
General		Overall		Conference		Postseason (Note: Although the first Rose Bowl Game was played in 1902, it has been continuously played since the 1916 game, and is recognized as the oldest bowl game by the NCAA. "—" indicates any season prior to 1916 when postseason games were not played.)	
No.	Order of coaches (Note: A running total of the number of head coaches, with coaches who served separate tenures being counted only once. Interim head coaches are represented with "Int" and are not counted in the running total. "—" indicates the team played but either without a coach or no coach is on record. "X" indicates an interim year without play.)	GC	Games coached	CW	Conference wins	PW	Postseason wins
DC	Division championships	OW	Overall wins	CL	Conference losses	PL	Postseason losses
CC	Conference championships	OL	Overall losses	CT	Conference ties	PT	Postseason ties
NC	National championships	OT	Overall ties (Note: Overtime rules in college football were introduced in 1996, making ties impossible in the period since.)	C%	Conference winning percentage		
†	Elected to the College Football Hall of Fame	O%	Overall winning percentage (Note: When computing the win–loss percentage, a tie counts as half a win and half a loss.)				

== Coaches ==
No.	Name	Term	GC	OW	OL	OT	O%	CW	CL	CT	C%	PW	PL	CCs	Awards
1	C. O. Braden	1925–1926	2	1	1	0	.500	—	—	—	—	—	—	—	—
2	Roy McLeod	1927	2	1	0	1	.750	—	—	—	—	—	—	—	—
3	Harry J. Wienbergen	1928–1943, 1946–1949, 1951–1952	134	50	71	13	.422	—	—	—	—	—	—	1	—
4	Joe Gerlach	1944–1945	7	2	3	2	.429	—	—	—	—	—	—	—	—
5	Loy Young	1950	8	5	2	1	.688	4	1	0	.800	—	—	—	—
6	Forrest Lothrop	1953–1955	20	10	10	0	.500	10	8	0	.556	—	—	1	—
7	Paul Kemp	1956	6	4	2	0	.667	4	2	0	.667	—	—	—	—
8	Bob Tracy	1957–1962	44	25	18	1	.580	23	13	1	.635	—	—	2	—
9	Roger Huffman	1963–1965	24	15	7	2	.667	12	5	1	.694	—	—	—	—
10	Orlo Sundre	1966–1967	16	3	13	0	.188	1	11	0	.083	—	—	—	—
11	Morris Martin	1968–1970	24	10	12	2	.458	7	7	2	.500	—	—	—	—
12	Herb Hollyman	1971	8	2	6	0	.250	1	4	0	.200	—	—	—	—
13	Bob Lasater	1972–1975	36	21	14	1	.597	12	8	0	.600	—	—	1	—
14	Hank Biesiot	1976–2013	380	258	121	1	.680	173	72	0	.706	6	14	14	—
15	Pete Stanton	2014–present	134	98	36	0	.766	76	9	0	.894	3	10	10	—
