= Pete Stanton =

American football coach

Current position
- Title: Athletic director & head coach
- Team: Dickinson State
- Conference: Frontier
- Record: 103–42

Biographical details
- Education: Dickinson State University (BA); Montana State University (MA)

Playing career

Football
- 1984–1987: Dickinson State
- Position: Safety

Coaching career (HC unless noted)

Football
- 1989-1998: Terry HS (MT)
- 1998-2000: Belgrade HS (MT)
- 2000–2013: Dickinson State (assistant)
- 2014–present: Dickinson State

Track and field
- 2000–2013: Dickinson State

Administrative career (AD unless noted)
- 2017–2019: Dickinson State (interim AD)
- 2019–present: Dickinson State

Head coaching record
- Overall: 103–42 (college football)
- Tournaments: Football; 3–10 (NAIA playoffs)

Accomplishments and honors

Championships
- Football; 10 NSAA (2015–2024) Track and field 3 NAIA men's outdoor (2004–2006)

Awards
- Football; NAIA All-American (1987); NAIA Academic All-American (1987); 2× All-NDCAC; 9× NSAA Coach of the Year (2015–2017, 2019–2024) Track and field 4× NAIA Men's Outdoor Coach of the Year (2003–2006)

Pete Stanton is an American college football coach and athletic director. He is the head football coach and athletic director for Dickinson State University, holding the position of head coach since 2014 and athletic director since 2017.

== Playing career ==
A native of Baker, Montana, Stanton played college football as a safety at Dickinson State University in the mid-1980s. While there he helped the Blue Hawks win two North Dakota College Athletic Conference (NDCAC) championships and make two appearances in the NAIA Division II football national championship playoffs. Stanton was named to the All-NDCAC team twice. He named a first-team NAIA All-American and a NAIA Academic All-American in 1987.

== Coaching career ==
=== Early coaching career ===
Following his graduation from Dickinson State in 1987, Stanton spent nine seasons as the head football coach at Terry High School in Terry, Montana. While there he accumulated a 70–20 overall record and appeared in three state title games. He then served two seasons as the head football coach at Belgrade High School in Belgrade, Montana.

=== Dickinson State ===
==== Football ====
In 2000, Stanton was hired as an assistant coach for the Dickinson State football team. As an assistant, he helped lead the Blue Hawks to seven conference championships and seven appearances in the NAIA football national championship playoffs. In December 2013, Stanton named Dickinson State's head football coach, replacing NAIA Hall of Famer Hank Biesiot. In his time as the head coach of the Blue Hawks, Stanton has accumulated an overall record of 98-36 and has led the team to ten NSAA championships and ten NAIA playoff appearances. Stanton has also been named as the NSAA Coach of the Year nine times.

==== Track and field ====
From 2003 until 2013, Stanton was the head coach of both the men's and women's track and field teams at Dickinson State. His men's outdoor track and field team won three straight NAIA national championships from 2004 to 2006, as well as finishing runner-up five times in 2003, 2007, 2008, 2009, and 2010. Stanton was named as the NAIA Men's Outdoor Track and Field Coach of the Year four consecutive times, from 2003 to 2006. From 2003 until 2012, the men's team also won ten straight conference championships, and Stanton was named as the conference's coach of the year ten times.

=== Administration ===
Stanton was named as the interim athletic director for Dickinson State in 2017, then was named officially as the athletic director in 2019. He was named as the NSAA athletic director of the year in 2023, 2024, and 2025.

== Personal life ==
Stanton has a wife named Candance and two children. He received a master's degree in education from Montana State University.

== Head coaching record ==
=== College football ===
Year	Team	Overall	Conference	Standing	Bowl/playoffs	NAIA Coaches'^{#}
Dickinson State Blue Hawks (North Star Athletic Association) (2014–2024)
2014	Dickinson State	7–4	5–1	2nd		
2015	Dickinson State	8–3	5–1	1st	L NAIA First Round	18
2016	Dickinson State	9–3	6–0	1st	L NAIA First Round	14
2017	Dickinson State	9–2	8–0	1st	L NAIA First Round	13
2018	Dickinson State	9–3	6–1	1st	L NAIA Quarterfinal	8
2019	Dickinson State	8–3	6–1	1st	L NAIA First Round	17
2020–21	Dickinson State	9–1	9–0	1st	L NAIA First Round	11
2021	Dickinson State	8–3	8–0	1st	L NAIA First Round	15
2022	Dickinson State	8–3	6–0	1st	L NAIA First Round	17
2023	Dickinson State	10–2	8–0	1st	L NAIA Second Round	16
2024	Dickinson State	10–2	8–0	1st	L NAIA Second Round	14
Dickinson State Blue Hawks (Frontier Conference) (2025–present)
2025	Dickinson State	3–7	1–5	6th (East)		
2026	Dickinson State	5–6	4–2	T–2nd (East)		
Dickinson State:		103–42	80–11			
Total:		103–42				
National championship Conference title Conference division title or championship game berth
