= Forrest Lothrop =

American football player and coach (1924–2021)

Biographical details
- Born: June 16, 1924; South Dakota, U.S.
- Died: May 29, 2021 (aged 96); Lennox, South Dakota, U.S.

Playing career
- 1946–1948: South Dakota State

Coaching career (HC unless noted)
- 1950–1951: Beresford HS (SD)
- 1953–1955: Dickinson State

Head coaching record
- Overall: 10–10 (college)

Accomplishments and honors

Championships
- NDIC (1955)

Forrest Tisdale "Tiz" Lothrop (June 16, 1924 – May 29, 2021) was an American football coach. Lothrop was the sixth head football coach at Dickinson State College—now known as Dickinson State University–in Dickinson, North Dakota, serving for three seasons, from 1953 to 1955, and compiling a record of 10–10.

Lothrop attended high school in Redfield, South Dakota and played college football at South Dakota State University in Brookings, South Dakota. In 1950, he was appointed head football coach at Beresford High School in Beresford, South Dakota.

He died in Lennox, South Dakota in May 2021 at the age of 96.

== Head coaching record ==
=== College ===
Year	Team	Overall	Conference	Standing	Bowl/playoffs
Dickinson State Savages (North Dakota Intercollegiate Conference) (1953–1955)
1953	Dickinson State	2–5	2–4	T–6th	
1954	Dickinson State	3–4	3–3	5th	
1955	Dickinson State	5–1	5–1	T–1st	
Dickinson State:		10–10	10–8		
Total:		10–10			
National championship Conference title Conference division title or championship game berth
