= Lasater =

Lasater is a surname. Notable people with the surname include:

- Bob Lasater, former American football coach
- Brent Lasater (born 1960), American politician
- John R. Lasater (born 1931), retired U.S. Air Force Brigadier General
- Judith Hanson Lasater (born 1947), American yoga teacher and writer

== See also ==
- Bryant-Lasater House
- Freeborn T. Lasater House
