= 2015 NAIA football season =

American college football season

- National Championship: Daytona Beach Municipal Stadium; Daytona Beach, FL; December 19, 2015
- Champion: Marian (IN)
- Player of the Year: Ryan Kasdorf (quarterback, Morningside)

The 2015 NAIA football season was the component of the 2015 college football season organized by the National Association of Intercollegiate Athletics (NAIA) in the United States. The season's playoffs, known as the NAIA Football National Championship, culminated with the championship game on December 19, at Daytona Beach Municipal Stadium in Daytona Beach, Florida. The Marian Knights defeated the Southern Oregon Raiders, 31–14, in the title game to win the program's second NAIA championship.

== Conference standings ==
2015 Central States Football League standings
| | Conf. | | | Overall |
| Team | W | | L | W | | L |
|---|---|---|---|---|---|---|
| No. 22 Arizona Christian $ | 6 | – | 0 | 6 | – | 3 |
| Langston | 5 | – | 1 | 7 | – | 3 |
| SAGU | 4 | – | 2 | 8 | – | 3 |
| Wayland Baptist | 2 | – | 4 | 4 | – | 6 |
| Texas College | 2 | – | 4 | 2 | – | 8 |
| Bacone | 2 | – | 4 | 2 | – | 9 |
| Lyon | 0 | – | 6 | 0 | – | 11 |
$ – Conference champion; Rankings from NAIA Coaches' Poll

2015 Frontier Conference football standings
| | Conf. | | | Overall |
| Team | W | | L | W | | L |
|---|---|---|---|---|---|---|
| No. 7 Montana Tech $^ | 9 | – | 1 | 10 | – | 2 |
| No. 2 Southern Oregon ^ | 8 | – | 2 | 11 | – | 3 |
| No. 16 Montana Western | 7 | – | 3 | 7 | – | 3 |
| Rocky Mountain | 4 | – | 6 | 5 | – | 6 |
| Carroll (MT) | 4 | – | 6 | 4 | – | 6 |
| College of Idaho | 4 | – | 6 | 4 | – | 7 |
| Eastern Oregon | 4 | – | 6 | 4 | – | 7 |
| Montana State–Northern | 0 | – | 10 | 0 | – | 11 |
$ – Conference champion; ^ – NAIA playoff participant; Rankings from NAIA Coaches' Poll

2015 Great Plains Athletic Conference football standings
| | Conf. | | | Overall |
| Team | W | | L | W | | L |
|---|---|---|---|---|---|---|
| No. 3 Morningside $^ | 9 | – | 0 | 12 | – | 2 |
| No. 9 Doane ^ | 8 | – | 1 | 9 | – | 2 |
| No. 15 Dakota Wesleyan | 7 | – | 2 | 9 | – | 2 |
| Concordia (NE) | 5 | – | 4 | 6 | – | 4 |
| Northwestern (IA) | 5 | – | 4 | 6 | – | 4 |
| Hastings | 4 | – | 5 | 5 | – | 5 |
| Nebraska Wesleyan | 3 | – | 6 | 4 | – | 6 |
| Briar Cliff | 2 | – | 7 | 3 | – | 8 |
| Dordt | 1 | – | 8 | 2 | – | 9 |
| Midland | 1 | – | 8 | 1 | – | 10 |
$ – Conference champion; ^ – NAIA playoff participant; Rankings from NAIA Coaches' Poll

2015 Heart of America Athletic Conference football standings
| | Conf. | | | Overall |
| Team | W | | L | W | | L |
|---|---|---|---|---|---|---|
North
| No. 6 Grand View x^ | 5 | – | 0 | 11 | – | 2 |
| No. 20 Benedictine (KS) | 3 | – | 2 | 7 | – | 4 |
| Peru State | 3 | – | 2 | 7 | – | 4 |
| No. 25 William Penn | 3 | – | 2 | 7 | – | 4 |
| Graceland | 1 | – | 4 | 2 | – | 9 |
| Culver–Stockton | 0 | – | 5 | 1 | – | 11 |
South
| No. 5 Baker x^ | 5 | – | 0 | 11 | – | 2 |
| MidAmerica Nazarene | 4 | – | 1 | 6 | – | 5 |
| Missouri Valley | 3 | – | 2 | 6 | – | 5 |
| Avila | 2 | – | 3 | 3 | – | 8 |
| Central Methodist | 1 | – | 4 | 3 | – | 8 |
| Evangel | 0 | – | 5 | 3 | – | 8 |
x – Division champion/co-champions; ^ – NAIA playoff participant; Rankings from NAIA Coaches' Poll

2015 Kansas Collegiate Athletic Conference football standings
| | Conf. | | | Overall |
| Team | W | | L | W | | L |
|---|---|---|---|---|---|---|
| No. 8 Tabor $^ | 9 | – | 0 | 11 | – | 2 |
| No. 14 Kansas Wesleyan ^ | 8 | – | 1 | 10 | – | 2 |
| Sterling | 7 | – | 2 | 7 | – | 3 |
| Ottawa | 6 | – | 3 | 6 | – | 4 |
| Bethel (KS) | 3 | – | 6 | 3 | – | 7 |
| Bethany (KS) | 3 | – | 6 | 3 | – | 8 |
| Friends | 3 | – | 6 | 3 | – | 8 |
| Saint Mary (KS) | 3 | – | 6 | 3 | – | 8 |
| Southwestern (KS) | 3 | – | 6 | 3 | – | 8 |
| McPherson | 0 | – | 9 | 0 | – | 10 |
$ – Conference champion; ^ – NAIA playoff participant; Rankings from NAIA Coaches' Poll

2015 Mid-South Conference football standings
| | Conf. | | | Overall |
| Team | W | | L | W | | L |
|---|---|---|---|---|---|---|
East Division
| No. 25 Georgetown (KY) x | 5 | – | 0 | 6 | – | 4 |
| Cumberlands (KY) | 4 | – | 1 | 7 | – | 3 |
| Pikeville | 3 | – | 2 | 4 | – | 7 |
| Kentucky Christian | 2 | – | 3 | 2 | – | 9 |
| Union (KY) | 1 | – | 4 | 1 | – | 9 |
| Bluefield | 0 | – | 5 | 1 | – | 10 |
West Division
| No. 11 Campbellsville x^ | 5 | – | 0 | 8 | – | 3 |
| No. 10 Reinhardt ^ | 4 | – | 1 | 9 | – | 2 |
| No. 13 Lindsey Wilson ^ | 3 | – | 2 | 8 | – | 3 |
| No. 23 Faulkner | 2 | – | 3 | 7 | – | 3 |
| Bethel (TN) | 1 | – | 4 | 4 | – | 7 |
| Cumberland (TN) | 0 | – | 5 | 3 | – | 8 |
x – Division champion/co-champions; ^ – NAIA playoff participant; Rankings from NAIA Coaches' Poll

2015 Mid-States Football Association standings
| | Conf. | | | Overall |
| Team | W | | L | W | | L |
|---|---|---|---|---|---|---|
Mideast League
| No. 4 Saint Francis (IN) x^ | 6 | – | 0 | 11 | – | 1 |
| No. 1 Marian (IN) ^ | 5 | – | 1 | 12 | – | 2 |
| Taylor | 4 | – | 2 | 7 | – | 3 |
| Concordia (MI) | 2 | – | 4 | 5 | – | 6 |
| Siena Heights | 2 | – | 4 | 4 | – | 6 |
| Lindenwood–Belleville | 2 | – | 4 | 4 | – | 6 |
| Missouri Baptist | 0 | – | 6 | 0 | – | 10 |
Midwest League
| No. 18 St. Francis (IL) x | 4 | – | 1 | 8 | – | 3 |
| No. 12 Saint Xavier x^ | 4 | – | 1 | 7 | – | 4 |
| No. 20 St. Ambrose | 3 | – | 2 | 8 | – | 2 |
| Robert Morris (IL) | 3 | – | 2 | 6 | – | 4 |
| Olivet Nazarene | 1 | – | 4 | 3 | – | 8 |
| Trinity International | 0 | – | 5 | 2 | – | 9 |
x – League champion/co-champions ^ – NAIA playoff participant; Rankings from NAIA Coaches' Poll

2015 North Star Athletic Association football standings
| | Conf. | | | Overall |
| Team | W | | L | W | | L |
|---|---|---|---|---|---|---|
| No. 18 Dickinson State $^ | 5 | – | 1 | 8 | – | 3 |
| Valley City State | 4 | – | 2 | 7 | – | 3 |
| Dakota State | 4 | – | 2 | 6 | – | 5 |
| Mayville State | 3 | – | 3 | 5 | – | 5 |
| Jamestown | 3 | – | 3 | 4 | – | 6 |
| Waldorf | 2 | – | 4 | 3 | – | 7 |
| Presentation | 0 | – | 6 | 3 | – | 6 |
$ – Conference champion; ^ – NAIA playoff participant; Rankings from NAIA Coaches' Poll

2015 Sun Conference football standings
| | Conf. | | | Overall |
| Team | W | | L | W | | L |
|---|---|---|---|---|---|---|
| No. 17 Point $^* | 5 | – | 0 | 9 | – | 3 |
| Southeastern | 4 | – | 1 | 9 | – | 2 |
| Webber International | 3 | – | 2 | 6 | – | 4 |
| Ave Maria | 2 | – | 3 | 4 | – | 7 |
| Edward Waters | 1 | – | 4 | 4 | – | 7 |
| Warner | 0 | – | 5 | 2 | – | 9 |
$ – Conference champion; ^ – NAIA playoff participant * – Point later forfeited their win over Southeastern.; Rankings from NAIA Coaches' Poll
