= 1990 Peru State Bobcats football team =

American college football season

1990 Peru State Bobcats football

NAIA Division II national champion TSAC champion

NCAA Division II National Championship Game, W 17–7 vs. Westminster (PA)
- Conference: Tri-State Athletic Conference
- Record: 12–0–1 (3–0 TSAC)
- Head coach: Tom Shea (5th season)

1990 Tri-State Athletic Conference football standings
	Conf.					Overall
Team	W		L		T	W		L		T
No. 5 Peru State $^	3	–	0	–	0	12	–	0	–	1
Northwestern (IA)	2	–	1	–	0	5	–	5	–	0
No. 22 Westmar	1	–	2	–	0	8	–	2	–	0
Benedictine (KS)	0	–	3	–	0	4	–	6	–	0
$ – Conference champion; ^ – NAIA Division II playoff participant; Rankings from NAIA Division II poll

The 1990 Peru State Bobcats football team was an American football team that represented Peru State College and won the national championship during the 1990 NAIA Division II football season. In their fifth season under head coach Tom Shea, the Bobcats compiled a 12–0–1 record. They participated in the NAIA Division II playoffs, defeating Dickinson State (38–34) in the quarterfinals, Baker (27–3) in the semifinals and Westminster (PA) (17–7) in the NAIA Division II Championship Game. The team was led by quarterback Nate Bradley who passed for a school-record 3,806 yards.

== Schedule ==
Date	Opponent	Site	Result	Attendance	Source
September 1	at Carroll (MT)*	Helena, MT	W 21–7		
September 15	at Dana*	Pioneer Field; Nebraska City, NE	W 42–27	2,200	
September 22	Southwest Minnesota State*	Peru, NE	W 27–17		
September 29	at Doane*	Crete, NE	W 53–12		
October 13	Northwestern (IA)	Peru, NE	W 22–6		
October 20	Westmar	Peru, NE	W 34–13		
October 27	at Benedictine (KS)	Atchison, KS	W 35–13		
November 3	at Northwest Missouri State*	Maryville, MO	T 10–10		
November 10	Midland Lutheran*	Peru, NE	W 37–7		
November 17	Wisconsin–La Crosse*	Peru, NE (NAIA Division II first round)	W 24–3		
December 1	at Dickinson State*	Dickinson, ND (NAIA Division II quarterfinal)	W 38–34		
December 8	vs. Baker*	Al Caniglia Field; Omaha, NE (NAIA Division II semifinal)	W 27–3	2,215	
December 15	vs. Westminster (PA)*	Al Caniglia Field; Omaha, NE (NAIA Division II National Championship Game)	W 17–7	3,034	
*Non-conference game
