= Tom Shea =

American football coach

Current position
- Title: Special adviser to head coach
- Team: Upper Iowa
- Conference: NSIC

Biographical details
- Education: Dakota State

Coaching career (HC unless noted)
- 1979: Dakota State (DC)
- 1980: Dakota State (OC)
- 1981–1983: Dakota State
- 1985: Peru State (OL)
- 1986–1990: Peru State
- 1991–1996: Mary
- 1997–1998: Central Arkansas (DC)
- 1999–2000: William Penn
- 2003–2006: Upper Iowa (DC)
- 2007–2008: Dakota State
- 2009–2019: Upper Iowa
- 2020–present: Upper Iowa (special adviser to HC)

Head coaching record
- Overall: 146–156–3
- Tournaments: 7–4 (NAIA D-II playoffs)

Accomplishments and honors

Championships
- 1 NAIA Division II (1990); 2 Tri-State Athletic (1989–1990); 2 NDCAC (1992, 1996)

Awards
- NAIA Division II Coach of the Year (1990)

Tom Shea is an American college football coach. He is the special adviser to head football coach at Upper Iowa University in Fayette, Iowa, a position he had assumed following the 2019. Shea served as the head football coach at Dakota State University in Madison, South Dakota from 1981 to 1983 and again from 2007 to 2008, Peru State College in Peru, Nebraska from 1986 to 1990, the University of Mary in Bismarck, North Dakota from 1991 to 1996, William Penn University in Oskaloosa, Iowa from 1999 to 2000, and Upper Iowa from 2009 to 2019, compiling career head coaching record of 146–156–3. His 1990 Peru State Bobcats football team won the NAIA Football Division II National Championship.

Shea graduated from Dakota State University with a bachelor's degree in physical education. He also graduated from South Dakota State University with a master's degree in physical education.

== Head coaching record ==
Year	Team	Overall	Conference	Standing	Bowl/playoffs
Dakota State Trojans (South Dakota Intercollegiate Conference) (1981–1983)
1981	Dakota State	3–7	2–4	5th	
1982	Dakota State	5–5	4–3	4th	
1983	Dakota State	5–4–1	5–1–1	2nd	
Peru State Bobcats (NAIA Division II independent) (1986–1987)
1986	Peru State	3–7			
1987	Peru State	5–5			
Peru State Bobcats (Tri-State Athletic Conference) (1988–1990)
1988	Peru State	6–4	0–3	4th	
1989	Peru State	8–2	3–0	1st	L NAIA Division II First Round
1990	Peru State	12–0–1	3–0	1st	W NAIA Division II Championship
Peru State:		34–18–1	6–3		
Mary Marauders (North Dakota College Athletic Conference) (1991–1996)
1991	Mary	7–2	3–2	3rd	
1992	Mary	7–1–1	4–1	T–1st	
1993	Mary	8–3	4–1	2nd	L NAIA Division II Quarterfinal
1994	Mary	6–3	3–2	T–3rd	
1995	Mary	11–2	5–1	2nd	L NAIA Division II Semifinal
1996	Mary	7–4	5–1	T–1st	L NAIA Division II First Round
Mary:		46–15–1	24–8		
William Penn Statesmen (Iowa Intercollegiate Athletic Conference) (1999–2000)
1999	William Penn	3–7	3–7	T–8th	
2000	William Penn	2–8	2–8	10th	
William Penn:		5–15	5–15		
Dakota State Trojans (Dakota Athletic Conference) (2007–2008)
2007	Dakota State	3–6	2–5	6th	
2008	Dakota State	3–7	1–6	7th	
Dakota State:		19–29–1	15–19–1		
Upper Iowa Peacocks (Northern Sun Intercollegiate Conference) (2009–2019)
2009	Upper Iowa	3–8	2–8 / 0–6	T–11th / 7th (South)	
2010	Upper Iowa	2–9	2–8 / 1–5	T–11th / T–6th (South)	
2011	Upper Iowa	3–8	2–8 / 0–6	12th / 7th (South)	
2012	Upper Iowa	2–9	2–9 / 0–7	T–13th / 8th (South)	
2013	Upper Iowa	6–5	6–5 / 3–4	T–5th / 5th (South)	
2014	Upper Iowa	6–5	6–5 / 2–5	T–5th / T–6th (South)	
2015	Upper Iowa	6–5	6–5 / 3–4	T–7th / T–5th (South)	
2016	Upper Iowa	3–8	3–8 / 2–5	T–11th / T–4th (South)	
2017	Upper Iowa	6–5	6–5 / 3–4	T–6th / 5th (South)	
2018	Upper Iowa	3–8	3–8 / 1–6	T–12th / T–7th (South)	
2019	Upper Iowa	2–9	2–9 / 1–6	T–12th / T–7th (South)	
Upper Iowa:		42–79	40–78		
Total:		146–156–3			
National championship Conference title Conference division title or championship game berth
