= George Bandy (American football) =

American college athletics coach and administrator (1926–1983)

Biographical details
- Born: c. 1926; Sacramento, California, U.S.
- Died: July 23, 1983 (aged 56–57); Helena, Montana, U.S.
- Education: Sacramento State College (1950, 1953); University of Montana (1967)

Playing career

Football
- 1944: USC

Baseball
- 1947: Wenatchee Chiefs
- 1947: Boise Pilots
- 1948: Wenatchee Chiefs
- 1948: Great Falls Electrics
- 1950: Great Falls Electrics
- Positions: Offensive lineman (football); Outfielder, catcher (baseball)

Coaching career (HC unless noted)

Football
- 1952: Grant Union HS (CA)
- 1953–1955: Belgrade HS (MT)
- 1956–1961: Northern Montana

Baseball
- 1952: Grant Union HS (CA)
- 1953–1955: Belgrade HS (MT)
- 1956–?: Northern Montana

Basketball
- 1953–1955: Belgrade HS (MT) (JV)
- 1956: Northern Montana

Wrestling
- 1955: Belgrade HS (MT)

Administrative career (AD unless noted)
- 1956–1975: Northern Montana

Head coaching record
- Overall: 9–23 (college football)

George Raymond Bandy (c. 1926 – July 23, 1983) was an American college athletics coach and administrator. He was the head football, baseball, and basketball coach for Northern Montana College—now known as Montana State University–Northern—in the mid-1950s.

== Early life and playing career ==
Bandy was born in Sacramento, California. He played less than a year of college football for USC as an offensive lineman before enlisting in the United States Navy for two years. When he returned he played baseball for the Wenatchee Chiefs, Boise Pilots, and Great Falls Electrics as an outfielder and catcher.

== Coaching and administrative career ==
In 1952, Bandy coached football and baseball for Grant Union High School. After one season he was hired as the football, baseball, basketball, and wrestling coach for Belgrade High School. In 1956, he was hired as the first head football coach for Northern Montana and was also named the baseball and basketball coach. He held the position of basketball coach for one season and the position of football coach for five. In five seasons as head football coach he led Northern Montana to a 9–23 record.

Bandy remained athletic director for Northern Montana for twenty years. He was also named president of Northern Montana in 1975 and was named to the same role for Western Montana College— now known as the University of Montana Western—in 1975. He served as the commissioner of the Frontier Conference starting in 1980.

== Death ==
Bandy died alongside his wife and recently adopted son when they drowned during a sailing accident in Helena, Montana.

== Head coaching record ==
=== College football ===
Year	Team	Overall	Conference	Standing	Bowl/playoffs
Northern Montana Lights (Montana Collegiate Conference) (1957–1961)
1957	Northern Montana	2–3	0–0 (Note: Northern Montana was not a full conference member in football until 1958.)	N/A	
1958	Northern Montana	3–3	2–3	4th	
1959	Northern Montana	1–6	1–4	5th	
1960	Northern Montana	1–6	1–4	5th	
1961	Northern Montana	2–5	2–3	4th	
Northern Montana:		9–23	6–14		
Total:		9–23			
