= Mark Henninger =

Current position
- Title: Assistant athletic director
- Team: Marian (IN)
- Conference: Crossroads League

Biographical details
- Born: December 11, 1973 (age 52); Ontario, California, U.S.

Playing career
- 1992–1995: Wittenberg

Coaching career (HC unless noted)
- 1996–1997: Millikin (GA)
- 1998: Hamburg Blue Devils (assistant)
- 1999: Wartburg (GA)
- 2000–2003: Wittenberg (assistant)
- 2004–2007: North Carolina Wesleyan (DC)
- 2008–2012: North Carolina Wesleyan
- 2013–2022: Marian (IN)

Administrative career (AD unless noted)
- 2022–present: Marian (IN) (assistant AD)

Head coaching record
- Overall: 118–48
- Tournaments: 0–1 (NCAA D-III playoffs); 13–7 (NAIA playoffs)

Accomplishments and honors

Championships
- 1 NAIA (2015); 2 USA SAC (2009–2010); 5 MSFA Mideast (2014, 2016, 2018–2019, 2021)

Awards
- 2× AFCA NAIA Coach of the Year (2014–2015); 2× NAIA Coach of the Year (2014–2015); USA SAC Coach of the Year (2009)

Mark Henninger is an American college athletics administrator and former football coach. He is the assistant athletic director at Marian University in Indianapolis, a position he has held since December 2022. Henninger served as the head football coach at North Carolina Wesleyan College—now known as North Carolina Wesleyan University— Rocky Mount, North Carolina from 2008 to 2012 and at Marian from 2013 to 2022. In 2014, his second season at Marian, he led the Knights to a share of the Mid-States Football Association Mideast League championship and an appearance in the NAIA Football National Championship title game, where they lost to Southern Oregon. In 2015, Henninger led the Knights to a championship game rematch with Southern Oregon, and this time Marian was the victor. For his efforts, Henninger was named the NAIA Coach of the Year by the American Football Coaches Association (AFCA) in 2014 and 2015.

== Personal life ==
Henninger resides in Brownsburg, Indiana with his wife, Jeni, his son, Jack, and his two daughters, Mary and Abby. Henninger's son, Jack, is an Offensive Analyst for the UAB Blazers football team.

== Head coaching record ==
Year	Team	Overall	Conference	Standing	Bowl/playoffs	NAIA Coaches'^{#}
North Carolina Wesleyan Battling Bishops (USA South Athletic Conference) (2008–2012)
2008	North Carolina Wesleyan	6–4	5–2	T–2nd		
2009	North Carolina Wesleyan	8–3	7–0	1st	L NCAA Division III First Round	
2010	North Carolina Wesleyan	7–3	6–1	T–1st		
2011	North Carolina Wesleyan	2–8	2–5	T–5th		
2012	North Carolina Wesleyan	3–7	2–5	7th		
North Carolina Wesleyan:		26–25	22–13			
Marian Knights (Mid-States Football Association) (2013–2022)
2013	Marian	6–5	4–2	T–2nd (MEL)		
2014	Marian	11–3	5–1	T–1st (MEL)	L NAIA Championship	2
2015	Marian	12–2	5–1	2nd (MEL)	W NAIA Championship	1
2016	Marian	11–1	6–0	1st (MEL)	L NAIA Quarterfinal	5
2017	Marian	7–3	4–2	3rd (MEL)		18
2018	Marian	10–1	6–0	1st (MEL)	L NAIA First Round	9
2019	Marian	12–1	6–0	1st (MEL)	L NAIA Championship	2
2020–21	Marian	5–2	5–1	2nd (MEL)	L NAIA First Round	9
2021	Marian	9–3	6–1	T–1st (MEL)	L NAIA Quarterfinal	
2022	Marian	9–2	6–1	2nd (MEL)	L NAIA Quarterfinal	
Marian:		92–23	53–9			
Total:		118–48				
National championship Conference title Conference division title or championship game berth
^{#}Rankings from NAIA Coaches' Poll.
