= 2015 NAIA football national championship =

2015 Waste Pro NAIA Football National Championship
Southern Oregon Raiders	Marian Knights
(11–2)	(11–2)
14	31
Head coach: Craig Howard	Head coach: Mark Henninger
Coaches 7	Coaches 6
	1	2	3	4	Total
Southern Oregon	0	0	0	14	14
Marian	0	14	0	17	31
- Date: December 19, 2015
- Season: 2015
- Stadium: Municipal Stadium
- Location: Daytona Beach, Florida
- MVP: Krishawn Hogan (Marian) - OOP; Dewayne Beckford (Marian) - ODP
- Attendance: 3,500

United States TV coverage
- Network: ESPN3

The 2015 NAIA football national championship was a four-round, sixteen team tournament played between November 21 and December 19 of 2015. The tournament concluded on December 19 with a single game played as the 60th Annual NAIA Football National Championship Presented by Waste Pro. Waste Pro became the newest title game sponsor in an announcement made October 31, 1015. The game matched #7 Southern Oregon (11–2) against #6 Marian (11–2) in a rematch between the two teams that met in the 2014 championship game. Marian was making its third appearance in the last four years of the championship event. In a reversal of last year's outcome, Marian prevailed 31-14 to win their second national title in the past four years.

The championship game was played at Municipal Stadium in Daytona Beach, Florida. A total of sixteen teams were selected to participate in the single-elimination tournament from across the country. The field included ten conference champions who received automatic bids. The field was filled with at-large selections that were awarded to the highest ranked teams that were not conference champions. Seeding was based on the final edition of the 2015 NAIA Coaches' Poll, with certain minor modifications given based on geographic considerations.

Quarterfinal pairings were announced by the NAIA on November 22, a day after the first round results were known.

Semifinal pairings were finalized by the NAIA on November 28, after the quarterfinal results were known.

This was the 2nd time the championship game was played at this venue after the prior six games were played at Barron Stadium in Rome, Georgia.

== Scoring Summary ==
Scoring summary

Quarter	Time	Drive			Team	Scoring information	Score	
Quarter	Time	Plays	Yards	TOP	Team	Scoring information	Southern Oregon Raiders	Marian Knights
2	4:55	13	77	5:59	Marian Knights	Maurice Woodard 19-yard touchdown run, Matt Plesac kick Good	0	7
2	1:05	7	44	2:58	Marian Knights	Krishawn Hogan 2-yard touchdown run, Matt Plesac kick Good	0	14
4	14:20	8	69	4:26	Marian Knights	Maurice Woodard 18-yard touchdown run, Matt Plesac kick Good	0	21
4	11:28	10	84	2:52	Southern Oregon Raiders	Matt Retzlaff 32-yard touchdown reception from Jeremy Scottow, Marcus Montano kick Good	7	21
4	8:02	6	87	3:26	Marian Knights	Krishawn Hogan 55-yard touchdown reception from Hayden Northern, Matt Plesac kick Good	7	28
4	5:36	4	-4	2:00	Marian Knights	37-yard field goal by Matt Plesac	7	31
4	0:50	5	44	0:51	Southern Oregon Raiders	Matt Retzlaff 10-yard touchdown reception from Tanner Trosin, Marcus Montano kick Good	14	31
"TOP" = time of possession. For other American football terms, see Glossary of American football.							Southern Oregon Raiders	Marian Knights

== Tournament bracket ==
1st Round; November 21
4	Saint Francis (IN) (9–0)	37
12	Reinhardt (GA) (9–1)	26
5	Montana Tech (9–1)	44
18	Dickinson State (ND) (8–2)	10
3	Grand View (IA) (10–1)	16
13	Lindsey Wilson (KY) (8–2)	13
6	Marian (IN) (8–2)	44
11	Campbellsville (KY) (8–2)	7
1	Morningside (IA) (10–1)	75*
16	Saint Xavier (IL) (7–3)	69
8	Tabor (KS) (10–1)	16
9	Doane (NE) (9–1)	14
2	Baker (KS) (10–1)	68
17	Point (GA) (8–2)	21
7	Southern Oregon (8–2)	52
10	Kansas Wesleyan (10–1)	8

Quarterfinals; November 28
4	Saint Francis (IN) (10–0)	42
5	Montana Tech (10–1)	20
3	Grand View (IA) (11–1)	3
6	Marian (IN) (9–2)	30
1	Morningside (IA) (11–1)	51
8	Tabor (KS) (11–1)	6
2	Baker (KS) (11–1)	19
7	Southern Oregon (9–2)	24

Semifinals; December 5
4	Saint Francis (IN) (11–0)	14
6	Marian (IN) (10–2)	45
1	Morningside (IA) (12–1)	27
7	Southern Oregon (10–2)	30

Championship; December 19
6	Marian (IN) (11–2)	31
7	Southern Oregon (11–2)	14

* denotes OT
