= Sundre (disambiguation) =

Sundre is a town in Alberta, Canada.

Sundre may also refer to:

- Sundre, Gotland, a settlement in Sweden
- Orlo Sundre (born 1932), a former American football coach
- 9374 Sundre, an asteroid discovered in 1993
- Sundre Township, Ward County, North Dakota, a township in Ward County, North Dakota, United States
- Ål i Hallingdal, a settlement in Buskerud, Norway, also known as Sundre

== See also ==
- Sunder (disambiguation)
- Sundar (disambiguation)
