= Robert Tracy =

Robert Tracy may refer to:

- Robert Tracy, 2nd Viscount Tracy (1593–1662), English politician
- Robert Tracy (judge) (1655–1735), English judge
- Robert Emmet Tracy (1909–1980), American prelate of the Roman Catholic Church
- Robert Tracy (dancer) (1955–2007), American dancer, writer, and educator
- Robert Tracy (MP) (died 1767), English member of parliament
- Robert J. Tracy, American law enforcement officer

== See also ==
- Bob Tracy, former American football coach
