= Roy McLeod =

American football, basketball, and track and field coach (1895–1955

Biographical details
- Born: March 16, 1895; Erie, North Dakota, U.S.
- Died: April 30, 1955 (aged 60); Moorhead, Minnesota, U.S.

Playing career

Football
- c. 1920: Jamestown

Basketball
- c. 1920: Jamestown

Track and field
- c. 1920: Jamestown

Coaching career (HC unless noted)

Football
- 1927: Dickinson State
- 1928–1934: Bismarck HS (ND)
- 1937–1942: Valley City State
- 1943–1945: Fergus Falls HS (MN)
- 1946–1947: Flathead County HS (MT)
- 1948–1952: Cavalier HS (ND)
- 1953–1954: Concordia (MN) (assistant)

Basketball
- 1928–1935: Bismarck HS (ND)
- 1935–1942: Valley City State
- 1943–1946: Fergus Falls HS (MN)
- 1946–1948: Flathead County HS (MT)

Track and field
- 1946–1948: Flathead County HS (MT)

Head coaching record
- Overall: 17–27–6 (college football); 55–68 (college basketball)

Roy Douglas McLeod (March 16, 1895 – April 30, 1955) was an American football, basketball, and track and field coach. He was the second head football coach at Dickinson State College serving for the 1927 season, finishing with a record of 1–0–1. McLeod later served as the head football coach at Valley City State University from 1936 to 1942.

McLeod was born March 16, 1895, in Erie, North Dakota. He graduated from Jamestown College High School and Jamestown College—now known as the University of Jamestown—in Jamestown, North Dakota. He also attended the University of Southern California (USC), and earned a degree from the University of Michigan. During World War I, he served in the 164th Regiment. McLeod coached for eight years at Bismarck High School in Bismark, North Dakota, and at high schools in Miles City, Montana, Fergus Falls, Minnesota, and Cavalier, North Dakota. In 1953, he joined the athletic staff at Concordia College in Moorhead, Minnesota, serving as an assistant football coach, trainer, and physical education instructor. McLeod died of a heart attack, on April 30, 1955, at a hospital in Moorhead.

== Head coaching record ==
=== College ===
Year	Team	Overall	Conference	Standing	Bowl/playoffs
Dickinson State Blue Hawks (Independent) (1927)
1927	Dickinson State	1–0–1			
Dickinson State:		1–0–1			
Valley City State Vikings (North Dakota Intercollegiate Conference) (1937–1942)
1936	Valley City State	2–6	2–5	5th	
1937	Valley City State	2–2–3	2–2–2	5th	
1938	Valley City State	5–2	5–1	2nd	
1939	Valley City State	2–5	2–4	4th	
1940	Valley City State	1–4–2	1–3–2	7th	
1941	Valley City State	4–3	3–3	T–4th	
1942	Valley City State	0–5	0–4	T–5th	
Valley City State:		16–27–5	15–22–4		
Total:		17–27–6			
