= Roger Huffman =

American football coach (1929–2018)

Biographical details
- Born: November 4, 1929; Killdeer, North Dakota, U.S.
- Died: April 23, 2018 (aged 88); Dickinson, North Dakota, U.S.
- Education: Dickinson State University (1955)

Coaching career (HC unless noted)
- 1963–1965: Dickinson State

Head coaching record
- Overall: 15–7–2

Roger Frederick Huffman (November 4, 1929 – April 23, 2018) was an American football coach. Huffman was the ninth head football coach at Dickinson State College—now known as Dickinson State University–in Dickinson, North Dakota and held that position for three seasons, from 1963 until 1965. His coaching record at Dickinson State was 15–7–2.

Roger Huffman Track at Dickinson State is named in his honor.

== Head coaching record ==
Year	Team	Overall	Conference	Standing	Bowl/playoffs
Dickinson State Savages (North Dakota College Athletic Conference) (1963–1965)
1963	Dickinson State	3–3–2	3–2–1	T–3rd	
1964	Dickinson State	6–2	4–2	T–3rd	
1965	Dickinson State	6–2	5–1	2nd	
Dickinson State:		15–7–2	12–5–1		
Total:		15–7–2			
