= Peru State Bobcats football =

- Last season: 1900; 126 years ago
- Head coach: Sean Wilkerson; 1st season, 0–0 (–)
- Location: Peru, Nebraska
- Stadium: Oak Bowl (capacity: 2,000)
- League: NAIA
- Conference: HAAC
- Colors: Azure blue and white

NAIA national championships
- NAIA Division II: 1990
- Mascot: Bobcat
- Website: PSC Bobcats

The Peru State Bobcats football team represents Peru State College, located in Peru, Nebraska, in NAIA college football.

The Bobcats, who began playing football in 1900, compete as members of the Heart of America Athletic Conference.

Peru State have won one NAIA national championship, in 1990.

== History ==
=== Conferences ===
- 1946–1976: Nebraska College Conference
- 1977–1987, 1991–1999, 2008–2010: NAIA independent
- 1988–1990: Tri-State Athletic Conference
- 2000–2007: Central States Football League
- 2011–present: Heart of America Athletic Conference

== Championships ==
=== National championships ===
Year	Association	Division	Head coach	Record	Opponent	Result
1990	NAIA (1)	Division II (1)	Tom Shea	12–0–1 (3–0 TSAC)	Westminster (PA)	W, 17–7

== Postseason appearances ==
=== NAIA playoffs ===
The Bobcats have made three appearances in the NAIA playoffs, with a combined record of 6–2 and one national championship.

Year	Round	Opponent	Result
1989	First Round	Baker (KS)	L, 27–30
1990	First Round; Quarterfinals; Semifinals; National Championship	Wisconsin–La Crosse; Dickinson State; Baker (KS); Westminster (PA)	W, 24–3; W, 38–34; W, 27–3; W, 17–7
1991	First Round; Quarterfinals; Semifinals	Nebraska Wesleyan; Midwestern State; Georgetown (KY)	W, 41–20; W, 28–24; L, 28–42

== Former coaches ==
- Lou Saban
