= Beresford Republic =

- Type: Weekly newspaper
- Owner: New Century Press
- Founder(s): H.A. Stroud; Ira Linch; Fred Linch
- Editor: Riva Sharples
- Founded: August 2, 1894
- Language: English
- Headquarters: Beresford, South Dakota
- Circulation: 1,187 (as of 2015)
- Website: therepublic-online.com

The Beresford Republic is the weekly newspaper of Beresford, South Dakota. The newspaper is published every Thursday.

During the school year, the Beresford High School newspaper, the Beresonian, is published as part of the Republic.

== History ==
On August 2, 1894, the first edition of the Union County Republican was published in Elk Point, South Dakota, by H.A. Stroud and brothers Ira Linch and Fred Linch. Later the Linch brothers sued Stroud seeking $213 in unpaid wages. After a year, Alex Reynick acquired the paper and relocated it to Beresford. He then renamed it to the Union County Republic.

In 1896, H.H. Sturges took over as editor, and his younger brother, H. A. Sturges, became co-owner two years later. H. A. Sturges published the paper for 27 years until 1925, when he sold it to Harold R. Carpenter. In 1927, Carpenter bought the older Beresford News and merged it into the Republic, leaving the town with one newspaper. In 1939, I.A. Nichols bought the Republic from Carpenter. His wife Gail Nichols worked as publisher. In 1945, a fire destroyed the paper's printing plant.

The Republic was acquired by Harvey E. Swennes in 1950, father and son John and Bill Bross in 1955, and Ed W. Sterns and R.T. Gebbie in 1959. Sterns owned the Inwood Herald and Gebbie owned the Hawarden Independent. It was then acquired by Jack Nelson in 1964, followed by Dwayne Straw and Douglas Hustrulid in 1978. The Republic joined with four other local papers (Alcester Union, Centerville Journal, Lennox Independent and Sioux Valley News) to form a joint venture called Quad City Printing, Inc., in 1981.

The Republic was acquired by M. Jill Sundstrom in 1990, followed by Craig and Mary Steensland, who owned four other papers, in 1998. The couple briefly suspended several papers, including the Republic, in 2005 due to competition from the Southeast South Dakota Star Advertiser. In 2013, Mary Steensland died. In 2023, the Alcester Union-Hudsonite was merged into the Republic to form the Alcester-Beresford-Hudson Republic.
