= Sunder =

Sunder may refer to:

- Sunder Singh (disambiguation), people with the name
  - Sunder (actor) (1908–1992), Indian actor
- Sunder (comics), a fictional character in the Marvel Universe
- Sundar or Sunder, an Indian given name (including a list of persons with the name)

== See also ==
- Sunder Nagar, a region in Mumbai, Maharashtra, India
- Sundre (disambiguation)
