= 2015 Mid-States Football Association season =

- League: NAIA
- Sport: football
- Duration: Fall-Winter 2015
- Number of teams: 13

2015

Football seasons
- ← 2014 2016 →

2015 Mid-States Football Association standings
	Conf.			Overall
Team	W		L	W		L
Mideast League
No. 4 Saint Francis (IN) x^	6	–	0	11	–	1
No. 1 Marian (IN) ^	5	–	1	12	–	2
Taylor	4	–	2	7	–	3
Concordia (MI)	2	–	4	5	–	6
Siena Heights	2	–	4	4	–	6
Lindenwood–Belleville	2	–	4	4	–	6
Missouri Baptist	0	–	6	0	–	10
Midwest League
No. 18 St. Francis (IL) x	4	–	1	8	–	3
No. 12 Saint Xavier x^	4	–	1	7	–	4
No. 20 St. Ambrose	3	–	2	8	–	2
Robert Morris (IL)	3	–	2	6	–	4
Olivet Nazarene	1	–	4	3	–	8
Trinity International	0	–	5	2	–	9
x – League champion/co-champions ^ – NAIA playoff participant; Rankings from NAIA Coaches' Poll

The 2015 Mid-States Football Association season was made up of 13 United States college athletic programs that competed in the Mid-States Football Association (MSFA) under the National Association of Intercollegiate Athletics (NAIA) for the 2015 college football season. The conference is divided into two leagues, the Mideast League and the Midwest league.

A total of three of the teams qualified for the 2012 NAIA Football National Championship: Saint Francis and Marian from the Mideast League and Saint Xavier from the Midwest League
