= Krishawn Hogan =

American football player (born 1995)

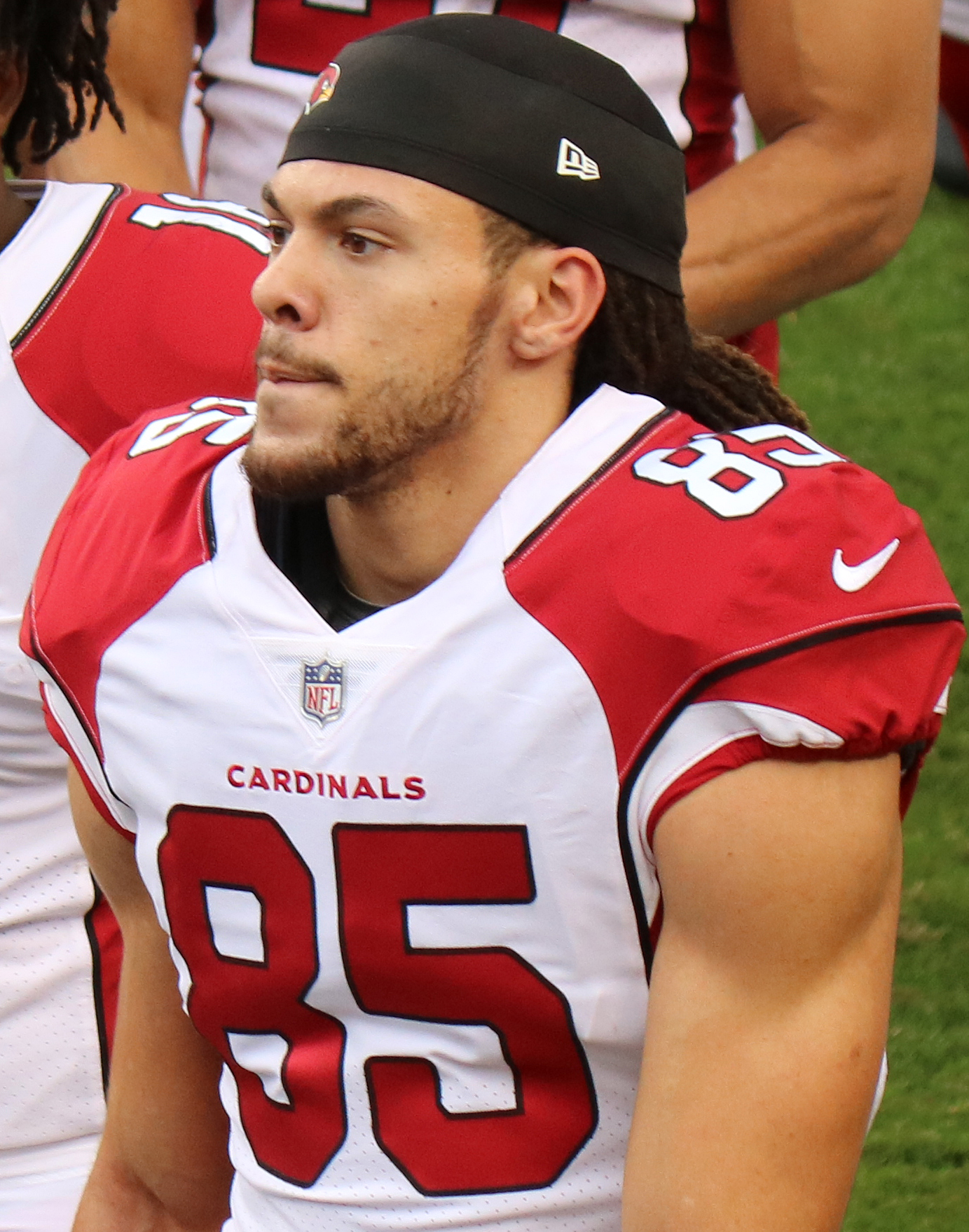
- Hogan with the Arizona Cardinals in 2017

No. 81
- Position: Wide receiver

Personal information
- Born: May 12, 1995 (age 31); Indianapolis, Indiana, U.S.
- Listed height: 6 ft 3 in (1.91 m)
- Listed weight: 217 lb (98 kg)

Career information
- High school: Warren Central (Indianapolis)
- College: Marian (IN) (2014–2016)
- NFL draft: 2017: undrafted

Career history
- Arizona Cardinals (2017)*; Indianapolis Colts (2017–2018); New Orleans Saints (2019); Tennessee Titans (2020)*; Indianapolis Colts (2020)*; Arizona Cardinals (2020–2021)*; Carolina Panthers (2021)*; Montreal Alouettes (2022)*
- * Offseason or practice squad member only

Awards and highlights
- NAIA national champion (2015); 3× First-team All-MSFA (2014–2016)

Career NFL statistics
- Receptions: 1
- Receiving yards: 4
- Stats at Pro Football Reference

Krishawn Hogan (born May 12, 1995) is an American former professional football player who was a wide receiver in the National Football League (NFL). He played college football for the Marian Knights.

== Early life ==
Hogan attended Warren Central High School in Indianapolis, Indiana, where as a football player, he did not earn any playing time during his first three years on the team. Hogan saw the field as a backup wide receiver during his senior year, logging 20 receptions and a touchdown during the season.

== College career ==
Hogan signed with Walsh University, an NCAA Division II school, after joining his cousin there on a recruiting trip. Hogan eventually left the team, joining NAIA program Marian University some time after. In three seasons at Marian, Hogan earned 263 receptions and 4,395 yards receiving, both school records. In addition, Hogan totaled 67 total all-purpose touchdowns. Hogan earned many honors throughout his stay at Marian, making Mideast League first-team three times, earning first-team All-American honors by the American Football Coaches Association, and being named Conference Offensive Player of the Year.

== Professional career ==
=== Pre-draft ===
Upon capturing the attention of multiple NFL scouts during his college career, Hogan was the first ever player from Marian University to earn an NFL Combine invite. There, he tested as a 79th percentile athlete according to Nike's SPARQ metric.

Pre-draft measurables
Height	Weight	Arm length	Hand span	40-yard dash	20-yard shuttle	Three-cone drill	Vertical jump	Broad jump	Bench press
6 ft 3 in (1.91 m)	222 lb (101 kg)	32 1/8 in (0.82 m)	9 7/8 in (0.25 m)	4.56 s	4.21 s	6.74 s	36 1/2 in (0.93 m)	10 ft 4 in (3.15 m)	13 reps
All values from NFL Combine

=== Arizona Cardinals (first stint) ===
After receiving contract offers from several teams as an undrafted free agent, Hogan agreed to join the Arizona Cardinals on April 29, 2017. Hogan reportedly performed impressively during his first mini-camp practices, though he earned reprimands from head coach Bruce Arians for multiple offside penalties. He was waived on September 2.

=== Indianapolis Colts (first stint) ===
On September 4, 2017, Hogan was signed to the Indianapolis Colts' practice squad. He was promoted to the active roster on September 26. Hogan was placed on injured reserve on October 9, after suffering a torn ACL in Week 5.

On September 1, 2018, Hogan was waived/injured by the Colts and was placed on injured reserve. He was released on September 8. Hogan was re-signed to the practice squad on October 19.

Hogan signed a reserve/future contract with Indianapolis on January 13, 2019. On August 31, Hogan was waived by the Colts.

=== New Orleans Saints ===
On September 18, 2019, Hogan was signed to the New Orleans Saints. He was promoted to the active roster on October 26. Hogan made his first professional catch on a four-yard reception in Week 16 against the Tennessee Titans. He was placed on injured reserve on December 25, with a hamstring injury.

Hogan was waived by New Orleans on August 2, 2020. Hogan had a tryout with the Detroit Lions on August 14.

=== Tennessee Titans ===
Hogan signed with the Tennessee Titans on August 19, 2020. He was waived by the Titans on September 5.

=== Indianapolis Colts (second stint) ===
On September 30, 2020, Hogan was signed to the Indianapolis Colts' practice squad. He was released on October 6.

=== Arizona Cardinals (second stint) ===
On December 23, 2020, Hogan signed with the practice squad of the Arizona Cardinals. He signed a reserve/future contract with Arizona on January 5, 2021. Hogan was waived/injured on June 3, and subsequently reverted to the team's injured reserve list the following day. Hogan was waived from injured reserve on June 21.

=== Carolina Panthers ===
On July 28, 2021, Hogan signed a one-year contract with the Carolina Panthers. He was waived by the Panthers on August 23.

=== Montreal Alouettes ===
Hogan signed with the Montreal Alouettes of the Canadian Football League on January 25, 2022. He was released by Montreal on June 4.

=== NFL career statistics ===
Year	Team	Games		Receiving					Rushing					Fumbles	
Year	Team	GP	GS	Rec	Yds	Avg	Lng	TD	Att	Yds	Avg	Lng	TD	Fum	Lost
2017	IND	2	0	0	0	0	0	0	0	0	0	0	0	1	0
2018	IND	Did not play due to injury													
2019	NO	8	0	1	4	4	4	0	0	0	0	0	0	0	0
Career		10	0	1	4	4	4	0	0	0	0	0	0	1	0

== Personal life ==
After departing Walsh University and before joining Marian University, Hogan worked as a janitor. He is the father of one child.
