= Scott Molander =

American education administrator

Scott Molander is an American education administrator and businessman. He is the fourteenth president of Dickinson State University.

== Biography ==
Molander was born in Crosby, North Dakota. He earned an associate degree from Williston State College and a bachelor's degree from Dickinson State University in 1988.

He co-founded Hat World with Glenn Campbell in 1995. The store grew into a national chain, and acquired competitor Lids in 2001. He is also the managing partner of Garage Living and SKINS Compression. Molander was appointed president of Dickinson State University in 2025.
