= 2015 NAIA football rankings =

One human poll makes up the 2015 National Association of Intercollegiate Athletics (NAIA) football rankings, sometimes called the NAIA Coaches' Poll or the football ratings. When the regular season is complete, the NAIA plans to sponsor a playoff to determine the year's national champion. A final poll will be taken after completion of the 2015 NAIA Football National Championship.

== Poll release dates ==
The poll release dates are scheduled to be:

2015 Poll Release Dates
Spring	April 13
Preseason	August 10
Week 1	September 14
Week 2	September 21
Week 3	September 28
Week 4	October 5
Week 5	October 12
Week 6	October 19
Week 7	October 26
Week 8	November 2
Week 9	November 9
Week 10 (Final Regular Season)	November 15
Postseason	December 21

== Week by week rankings ==
	Week 0-Spring Apr 13	Week 0-Preseason Aug 10	Week 1-Poll 1 Sep 14	Week 2-Poll 2 Sep 21	Week 3-Poll 3 Sep 28	Week 4-Poll 4 Oct 5	Week 5-Poll 5 Oct 12	Week 6-Poll 6 Oct 19	Week 7-Poll 7 Oct 26	Week 8-Poll 8 Nov 2	Week 9-Poll 9 Nov 9	Week 10-Final Nov 15	Week 11-Postseason Dec 21	
1.	Southern Oregon	(T) Southern Oregon	Marian (IN)	Morningside (IA)	Lindsey Wilson (KY)	Lindsey Wilson (KY)	Lindsey Wilson (KY)	Lindsey Wilson (KY)	Southern Oregon	Southern Oregon	Morningside (IA)	Morningside (IA)	Marian (IN)	1.
2.	Marian (IN)	(T) Marian (IN)	Morningside (IA)	Lindsey Wilson (KY)	Southern Oregon	Southern Oregon	Southern Oregon	Southern Oregon	Morningside (IA)	Morningside (IA)	Baker (KS)	Baker (KS)	Southern Oregon	2.
3.	Morningside (IA)	Morningside (IA)	Lindsey Wilson (KY)	Baker (KS)	Faulkner (AL)	Morningside (IA)	Morningside (IA)	Morningside (IA)	Baker (KS)	Baker (KS)	Grand View (IA)	Grand View (IA)	Morningside (IA)	3.
4.	Saint Xavier (IL)	(T) Saint Xavier (IL)	Southern Oregon	(T) Southern Oregon	Morningside (IA)	Carroll (MT)	Baker (KS)	Baker (KS)	Grand View (IA)	Grand View (IA)	Doane (NE)	Saint Francis (IN)	Saint Francis (IN)	4.
5.	Carroll (MT)	(T) Carroll (MT)	Faulkner (AL)	(T) Faulkner (AL)	Carroll (MT)	Saint Xavier (IL)	Grand View (IA)	Grand View (IA)	Doane (NE)	Doane (NE)	Saint Francis (IN)	Montana Tech	Baker (KS)	5.
6.	Grand View (IA)	Grand View (IA)	Baker (KS)	Carroll (MT)	Marian (IN)	Baker (KS)	Doane (NE)	Doane (NE)	Reinhardt (GA)	Saint Francis (IN)	Montana Tech	Marian (IN)	Grand View (IA)	6.
7.	Lindsey Wilson (KY)	Lindsey Wilson (KY)	Carroll (MT)	Robert Morris (IL)	Saint Xavier (IL)	Grand View (IA)	Saint Francis (IN)	Saint Francis (IN)	Saint Francis (IN)	Reinhardt (GA)	Marian (IN)	Southern Oregon	Montana Tech	7.
8.	Missouri Valley (MO)	MidAmerica Nazarene (KS)	Saint Xavier (IL)	Marian (IN)	Baker (KS)	Doane (NE)	Reinhardt (GA)	Reinhardt (GA)	Lindsey Wilson (KY)	Marian (IN)	Southern Oregon	Tabor (KS)	Tabor (KS)	8.
9.	MidAmerica Nazarene (KS)	Missouri Valley (MO)	Northwestern (IA)	Saint Xavier (IL)	Grand View (IA)	Saint Francis (IN)	Robert Morris (IL)	Robert Morris (IL)	Marian (IN)	Montana Tech	Tabor (KS)	Doane (NE)	Doane (NE)	9.
10.	Faulkner (AL)	Faulkner (AL)	Grand View (IA)	Northwestern (IA)	Doane (NE)	Faulkner (AL)	Marian (IN)	Marian (IN)	Montana Tech	Tabor (KS)	Montana Western	Kansas Wesleyan	Reinhardt (GA)	10.
11.	Georgetown (KY)	Georgetown (KY)	Robert Morris (IL)	Grand View (IA)	Saint Francis (IN)	Robert Morris (IL)	Carroll (MT)	Tabor (KS)	Tabor (KS)	Saint Xavier (IL)	Kansas Wesleyan	Campbellsville (KY)	Campbellsville (KY)	11.
12.	Northwestern (IA)	Northwestern (IA)	William Penn (IA)	William Penn (IA)	Robert Morris (IL)	Dakota Wesleyan (SD)	Tabor (KS)	Montana Tech	Saint Xavier (IL)	Benedictine (KS)	Campbellsville (KY)	Reinhardt (GA)	Saint Xavier (IL)	12.
13.	Eastern Oregon	Eastern Oregon	Missouri Valley (MO)	Doane (NE)	Dakota Wesleyan (SD)	Reinhardt (GA)	Montana Tech	Saint Xavier (IL)	William Penn (IA)	Montana Western	Reinhardt (GA)	Lindsey Wilson (KY)	Lindsey Wilson (KY)	13.
14.	Ottawa (KS)	Ottawa (KS)	Doane (NE)	Saint Francis (IN)	Reinhardt (GA)	Marian (IN)	Saint Xavier (IL)	William Penn (IA)	Robert Morris (IL)	Kansas Wesleyan	Lindsey Wilson (KY)	Dakota Wesleyan (SD)	Kansas Wesleyan	14.
15.	Campbellsville (KY)	Baker (KS)	Montana Tech	Valley City State (ND)	Northwestern (IA)	Tabor (KS)	Kansas Wesleyan	Northwestern (IA)	Benedictine (KS)	Lindsey Wilson (KY)	Dakota Wesleyan (SD)	Montana Western	Dakota Wesleyan (SD)	15.
16.	Baker (KS)	Campbellsville (KY)	Valley City State (ND)	Montana Western	Tabor (KS)	Montana Western	William Penn (IA)	Benedictine (KS)	Montana Western	St. Francis (IL)	Benedictine (KS)	Saint Xavier (IL)	Montana Western	16.
17.	Valley City State (ND)	Valley City State (ND)	Saint Francis (IN)	Dakota Wesleyan (SD)	Montana Western	Montana Tech	Dakota Wesleyan (SD)	Montana Western	Kansas Wesleyan	Campbellsville (KY)	Saint Xavier (IL)	Point (GA)	Point (GA)	17.
18.	William Penn (IA)	Langston (OK)	Benedictine (KS)	MidAmerica Nazarene (KS)	Montana Tech	William Penn (IA)	Faulkner (AL)	Carroll (MT)	St. Francis (IL)	Dakota Wesleyan (SD)	Point (GA)	(T) Dickinson State (ND)	(T) Dickinson State (ND)	18.
19.	Langston (OK)	William Penn (IA)	Montana Western	Reinhardt (GA)	William Penn (IA)	Kansas Wesleyan	St. Francis (IL)	Kansas Wesleyan	Dakota Wesleyan (SD)	William Penn (IA)	William Penn (IA)	(T) St. Francis (IL)	(T) St. Francis (IL)	19.
20.	Robert Morris (IL)	Robert Morris (IL)	Webber International (FL)	Tabor (KS)	Peru State (NE)	Northwestern (IA)	Northwestern (IA)	St. Francis (IL)	Campbellsville (KY)	Cumberlands (KY)	Robert Morris (IL)	St. Ambrose (IA)	St. Ambrose (IA)	20.
21.	Friends (KS)	Friends (KS)	MidAmerica Nazarene (KS)	Montana Tech	Kansas Wesleyan	Benedictine (KS)	Benedictine (KS)	Dakota Wesleyan (SD)	Cumberlands (KY)	Point (GA)	Dickinson State (ND)	Benedictine (KS)	Benedictine (KS)	21.
22.	Doane (NE)	(T) Doane (NE)	Dakota Wesleyan (SD)	Missouri Valley (MO)	Webber International (FL)	St. Francis (IL)	Montana Western	Campbellsville (KY)	Point (GA)	Northwestern (IA)	St. Francis (IL)	Arizona Christian	Arizona Christian	22.
23.	Webber International (FL)	(T) Tabor (KS)	Langston (OK)	Webber International (FL)	Benedictine (KS)	St. Ambrose (IA)	Webber International (FL)	Concordia (NE)	Northwestern (IA)	Robert Morris (IL)	St. Ambrose (IA)	(T) William Penn (IA)	(T) Faulkner (AL)	23.
24.	Tabor (KS)	Webber International (FL)	(T) Tabor (KS)	Kansas Wesleyan	St. Francis (IL)	Webber International (FL)	Dickinson State (ND)	Cumberlands (KY)	Concordia (NE)	Dickinson State (ND)	Arizona Christian	(T) Faulkner (AL)	(T) William Penn (IA)	24.
25.	Benedictine (KS)	Benedictine (KS)	(T) Reinhardt (GA)	Peru State (NE)	St. Ambrose (IA)	Dickinson State (ND)	St. Ambrose (IA)	Southeastern (FL)	SAGU	St. Ambrose (IA)	Faulkner (AL)	Georgetown (KY)	Georgetown (KY)	25.
	Week 0-Spring Apr 13	Week 0-Preseason Aug 10	Week 1-Poll 1 Sep 14	Week 2-Poll 2 Sep 21	Week 3-Poll 3 Sep 28	Week 4-Poll 4 Oct 5	Week 5-Poll 5 Oct 12	Week 6-Poll 6 Oct 19	Week 7-Poll 7 Oct 26	Week 8-Poll 8 Nov 2	Week 9-Poll 9 Nov 9	Week 10-Final Nov 15	Week 11-Postseason Dec 21	
		Dropped: NONE	Dropped: Georgetown (KY); Eastern Oregon; Ottawa (KS); Campbellsville (KY); Friends (KS)	Dropped: Benedictine (KS); Langston (OK)	Dropped: Valley City State (ND); MidAmerica Nazarene (KS); Missouri Valley (MO)	Dropped: Peru State (NE)	Dropped: NONE	Dropped: Faulkner (AL); Webber International (FL); Dickinson State (ND); St. Ambrose (IA)	Dropped: Carroll (MT); Southeastern (FL)	Dropped: Concordia (NE); SAGU	Dropped: Cumberlands (KY); Northwestern (IA)	Dropped: Robert Morris (IL)	Dropped: NONE	

Legend
	No change in ranking
	Increase in ranking
	Decrease in ranking
	Not ranked previous week
	NAIA National Champion
(т)	Tied with team above or below also with this symbol

== Leading vote-getters ==
Since the inception of the Coaches' Poll in 1999, the #1 ranking in the various weekly polls has been held by only a select group of teams. Through the end of 2015, the team and the number of times they have held the #1 weekly ranking are shown below. The number of times a team has been ranked #1 in the postseason poll (the national champion) is shown in parentheses.

There has been only one tie for the leading vote-getter in a weekly poll. In 2015, Southern Oregon was tied with Marian (IN) in the preseason poll.

In 1999, the results of a postseason poll, if one was conducted, are not known. Therefore, an additional poll was presumed, and the #1 postseason ranking has been credited to the postseason tournament champion, the Northwestern Oklahoma State Rangers.

Team	Total #1 Rankings
Carroll (MT)	57 (6)
Sioux Falls (SD)	55 (3)
Georgetown (KY)	25 (2)
Morningside (IA)	20
Saint Xavier (IL)	14 (1)
Marian (IN)	12 (2)
Northwestern Oklahoma State	12 (1)
Southern Oregon	5 (1)
Grand View (IA)	4 (1)
Lindsey Wilson (KY)	4
Azusa Pacific (CA)	3
Saint Francis (IN)	3
Cumberlands (KY)	2
