= Bob Tracy =

American sports coach (1928–2008)

Biographical details
- Born: October 17, 1928
- Died: May 10, 2008 (aged 79); Arizona, U.S.

Playing career

Football
- c. 1950–1953: Northern State

Track
- c. 1950–1954: Northern State
- Positions: Center, guard, tackle (football)

Coaching career (HC unless noted)

Football
- 1954: Beresford HS (SD)
- 1955–1956: Northern State (assistant)
- 1957–1962: Dickinson State
- 1963: St. Cloud (line)

Basketball
- 1962–1963: Dickinson State

Track and field
- 1957–1963: Dickinson State
- 1963–1968: St. Cloud
- c. 1970: Minnesota (assistant)
- 1972–1976: Hawaii

Cross country
- 1964–1967: St. Cloud

Head coaching record
- Overall: 25–18–1 (college football); 12–10 (college basketball)

Accomplishments and honors

Championships
- Football; 2 NDIC (1958, 1960)

Robert Anthony Tracy (October 17, 1928 – May 10, 2008) was an American football, basketball, track, and cross country coach. He was the eighth head football coach at Dickinson State College—now known as Dickinson State University–in Dickinson, North Dakota, serving for six seasons, from 1957 to 1962, and compiling a record of 25–18–1.

A native of Waubay, South Dakota, competed in football and track at Northern State Teachers College—now known as Northern State University—in Aberdeen, South Dakota, before graduating in 1954. He was a center, guard, tackle on the football team and a weightman on the track team. Tracy was the head track coach and an assistant football coach at Northern State for two years before he was appointed head coach in football and track at Dickinson State in May 1957. He was also the head basketball coach at Dickinson State for one season, in 1962–63, tallying a mark of 12–10. Tracy resigned from Dickinson State in May 1963 to take a job as head track coach and line coach for the football team at St. Cloud State University in St. Cloud, Minnesota.

After working as an assistant track coach at the University of Minnesota, Tracy was appointed an assistant professor of physical education at the University of Hawaiʻi at Mānoa in 1971. He was head coach of the men's and women's track teams at Hawaii from 1972 to 1976. There he mentored Terry Albritton when Albritton set the world record in shot put in 1976.

== Head coaching record ==
=== College football ===
Year	Team	Overall	Conference	Standing	Bowl/playoffs
Dickinson State Savages (North Dakota Intercollegiate Conference) (1957–1962)
1957	Dickinson State	2–4–1	2–3–1	5th	
1958	Dickinson State	6–1	6–1	T–1st	
1959	Dickinson State	5–2	4–2	2nd	
1960	Dickinson State	5–3	5–1	1st	
1961	Dickinson State	5–3	4–2	T–2nd	
1962	Dickinson State	2–5	2–4	5th	
Dickinson State:		25–18–1	23–13–1		
Total:		25–18–1			
National championship Conference title Conference division title or championship game berth
