= 2015 Saint Francis Cougars football team =

American college football season

2015 Saint Francis Cougars football

NAIA Playoff Semifinalist MSFA (MEL) champion
- Conference: Mid-States Football Association
- Mideast League
- Record: 11–1 (6–0 MSFA (MEL))
- Head coach: Kevin Donley (18th season)
- Offensive coordinator: Patrick Donley, Trevor Miller (12th, 10th season)
- Defensive coordinator: Joey Didier, Eric Wagoner (6th, 8th season)
- Home stadium: Bishop John M. D'Arcy Stadium

2015 Mid-States Football Association standings
	Conf.			Overall
Team	W		L	W		L
Mideast League
No. 4 Saint Francis (IN) x^	6	–	0	11	–	1
No. 1 Marian (IN) ^	5	–	1	12	–	2
Taylor	4	–	2	7	–	3
Concordia (MI)	2	–	4	5	–	6
Siena Heights	2	–	4	4	–	6
Lindenwood–Belleville	2	–	4	4	–	6
Missouri Baptist	0	–	6	0	–	10
Midwest League
No. 18 St. Francis (IL) x	4	–	1	8	–	3
No. 12 Saint Xavier x^	4	–	1	7	–	4
No. 20 St. Ambrose	3	–	2	8	–	2
Robert Morris (IL)	3	–	2	6	–	4
Olivet Nazarene	1	–	4	3	–	8
Trinity International	0	–	5	2	–	9
x – League champion/co-champions ^ – NAIA playoff participant; Rankings from NAIA Coaches' Poll

The 2015 Saint Francis Cougars football team represented the University of Saint Francis, located in Fort Wayne, Indiana, in the 2015 NAIA football season. They were led by head coach Kevin Donley, who served his 18th year as the first head coach in the history of Saint Francis football. The Cougars played their home games at Bishop John D'Arcy Stadium and were members of the Mid-States Football Association (MSFA) Mideast League (MEL). The Cougars finished as the MSFA MEL champion and received an automatic bid to the NAIA playoffs.

== Schedule ==
(11–1 overall, 6–0 conference)

Date	Time	Opponent	Rank	Site	Result	Attendance
September 5	7:00pm	Olivet Nazarene (IL)*		Bishop D'Arcy Stadium; Fort Wayne, IN	W 59–16	
September 12	7:00pm	at Taylor (IN)		Turner Stadium; Upland, IN	W 48–42	2,517
September 19	12:00pm	Trinity International (IL)*^{†}	No. 17	Bishop D'Arcy Stadium; Fort Wayne, IN	W 45–3	3,275
September 26	2:00pm	at Lindenwood-Belleville (IL)	No. 14	Lindenwood Stadium; Belleville, IL	W 74–13	550
October 3	1:00pm	at No. 6 Marian (IN)	No. 11	St Vincent Health Field; Indianapolis, IN	W 45–42	2,712
October 10	12:00pm	Siena Heights (MI)	No. 9	Bishop D'Arcy Stadium; Fort Wayne, IN	W 49–25	3,175
October 17	12:00pm	No. 28 Concordia (MI)	No. 7	Bishop D'Arcy Stadium; Fort Wayne, IN	W 48–7	2,883
October 24	2:00pm	at No. 9 Robert Morris (IL)*	No. 7	Morris Field; Chicago, IL	W 38–29	534
November 7	12:00pm	College of Faith (AR)*	No. 6	Bishop D'Arcy Stadium; Fort Wayne, IN (EXHIBITION)	61–0	1,699
November 14	2:00pm	at Missouri Baptist	No. 5	Spartan Field; St. Louis, MO	W 64–6	1,103
November 21	12:00pm	No. 12 Reinhardt (GA)*	No. 4	Bishop D'Arcy Stadium; Fort Wayne, IN (NAIA First Round)	W 37–26	1,277
November 28	12:00pm	No. 5 Montana Tech*	No. 4	Bishop D'Arcy Stadium; Fort Wayne, IN (NAIA Quarterfinal)	W 42–20	1,597
December 5	12:00pm	No. 6 Marian (IN)*	No. 4	Bishop D'Arcy Stadium; Fort Wayne, IN (NAIA Semifinal)	L 14–45	3,377
*Non-conference game; ^{†}Homecoming; Rankings from Coaches' Poll released prior to the game; All times are in Eastern time

== Game summaries ==
11/7/2015 - The Cougars originally scheduled a game against Redemption Christian College of Virginia Beach, VA. When the opponent failed to field a team for the 2015 season, USF found an opening in their schedule. The opening was filled with a game against the College of Faith, an Arkansas college whose schedule had also previously included Redemption. The Warriors traveled to Fort Wayne to compete in an exhibition game that did not count in the record or record books of USF.

11/14/2015 - With their 64–6 victory over Missouri Baptist, USF completed the 2015 season as the year's only undefeated team in the regular season of NAIA play.

11/21/2015 - The Cougars opened the 2015 playoff season with a 37–26 win over Reinhardt (GA). The game was played under adverse weather conditions as a steady, wet snowfall began shortly after the opening kick-off and persisted beyond the end of the game. For the game, Cougars' running back Justin Green rushed for 252 yards on 32 carries, setting a new single-game record for the victors. With the win, the Cougars continued their undefeated home playoff record, posting their 19th consecutive victory since their first home playoff victory in 2000.

11/28/2015 - The Cougars continued their home playoff winning streak, stretching it to 20 consecutive wins without a defeat. This week, the Cougars battled Montana Tech, champions of the Frontier League. The Cougars prevailed 42–20, marking the first time the team posted a playoff victory against a Frontier League opponent. After his record-setting game played last week, Justin Green added a second-straight game of rushing for over 200 yards.

12/5/2015 - The experience of the Knights was apparent as the Knights defeated USF 45–14. With the win, the Knights returned to the national championship game for the 2nd consecutive season and the 3rd time in the last 4 seasons. The Knights controlled the game in most all aspects, and they took control by scoring 24 points in a productive 2nd quarter. The loss avenged a regular-season loss to the Cougars which resulted in the Knights finishing in second place in the MEL regular season standings. The loss also ended the Cougars' streak of 20 consecutive playoff home game victories. Two weeks later, the Knights went on to win their second NAIA football national championship in the last four years.

== Ranking movements ==
Ranking movements Legend: ██ Increase in ranking ██ Decrease in ranking — = Not ranked
	Week											
Poll	Pre	1	2	3	4	5	6	7	8	9	10	Final
NAIA Coaches' Poll	—	17	14	11	9	7	7	7	6	5	4	4
