= Hank Biesiot =

American football player and coach (born 1945)

Biographical details
- Born: 1945 (age 80–81); Duluth, Minnesota, U.S.

Playing career

Football
- c. 1965: Mayville State

Coaching career (HC unless noted)

Football
- 1968–1971: Langdon HS (ND)
- 1972–1975: Dickinson State (DC)
- 1976–2013: Dickinson State

Baseball
- 1976–2001: Dickinson State

Head coaching record
- Overall: 258–121–1 (college football)
- Tournaments: Football; 6–14 (NAIA playoffs)

Accomplishments and honors

Championships
- Football; 7 NDCAC (1986–1987, 1989–1992, 1994–1995); 7 DAC (2002–2005, 2008–2010)

Awards
- NAIA Hall of Fame (2006)

Henry A. Biesiot (born 1945) is an American former football player and coach. He was the head football coach at Dickinson State University, a position he had held since the 1976 season before retiring following the 2013 season. Biesiot was one of the few college football coaches with over 200 career wins and 30 seasons of experience at the collegiate level. In 2006, he was inducted into the National Association of Intercollegiate Athletics (NAIA) Hall of Fame as a coach.

== Playing career ==
Biesiot was considered a "standout" player of both football and baseball while a student at Mayville State University.

== Coaching career ==
Biesiot is the former head football coach for the Dickinson State Blue Hawks located in Dickinson, North Dakota. In 2013, he finished his 38th seasons in that capacity, a streak that began in 1976. As of September 27, 2013, his coaching record at Dickinson State is 257 wins, 115 losses, and 1 tie. This ranks him #1 at Dickinson State in total wins and #2 at the school in winning percentage (.690).

As a coach, he has led his team to the NAIA playoffs a total of 14 times, advancing as far as the semifinals in 1991. His career playoff record was 6-14. His team concluded the 2010 regular season with an overall record of 8–1, 6–1 in conference play.

Biesiot earned his 250th career victory on October 30, 2010 with a 45–13 conference victory over rival Minot State.

Biesiot also was the head coach for the Blue Hawk baseball program from 1976 to 2001

== Academics ==
Biesiot is a retired Associate Professor of Health and Physical Education at Dickinson State. He earned a Bachelor of Science from Mayville State University and a Master of Science from the University of North Dakota.

== NAIA career wins leader ==
Biesiot was involved in a chase to the top of the record books for all time wins by an NAIA coach. Biesiot won all of his victories with one school, Dickinson State University, which played NAIA football during his entire tenure. Kevin Donley has more overall wins, but his record has been attained while coaching four different football programs, one of which was not in the NAIA.

== Head coaching record ==
=== College football ===
Year	Team	Overall	Conference	Standing	Bowl/playoffs
Dickinson State Blue Hawks (North Dakota College Athletic Conference) (1976–1999)
1976	Dickinson State	4–4–1	2–4	5th	
1977	Dickinson State	4–5	3–3	T–4th	
1978	Dickinson State	5–4	4–2	3rd	
1979	Dickinson State	7–2	4–2	3rd	
1980	Dickinson State	7–2	4–2	T–2nd	
1981	Dickinson State	9–1	6–0	1st	L NAIA Division II Quarterfinal
1982	Dickinson State	8–1	5–1	T–1st	
1983	Dickinson State	7–2	4–2	T–3rd	
1984	Dickinson State	6–3	4–2	T–3rd	
1985	Dickinson State	7–2	4–1	2nd	
1986	Dickinson State	9–1	5–0	1st	L NAIA Division II Quarterfinal
1987	Dickinson State	9–1	5–0	1st	L NAIA Division II First Round
1988	Dickinson State	8–1	5–1	2nd	
1989	Dickinson State	9–2	5–0	1st	L NAIA Division II Quarterfinal
1990	Dickinson State	9–2	4–1	T–1st	L NAIA Division II Quarterfinal
1991	Dickinson State	10–2	4–1	T–1st	L NAIA Division II Semifinal
1992	Dickinson State	7–2	4–1	T–1st	
1993	Dickinson State	5–4	3–2	3rd	
1994	Dickinson State	6–3	4–1	T–1st	
1995	Dickinson State	10–1	6–0	1st	L NAIA Division II First Round
1996	Dickinson State	5–4	3–3	T–4th	
1997	Dickinson State	6–3	4–2	T–2nd	
1998	Dickinson State	6–3	4–2	3rd	
1999	Dickinson State	7–3	3–2	2nd	L NAIA First Round
Dickinson State Blue Hawks (Dakota Athletic Conference) (2000–2011)
2000	Dickinson State	6–4	5–2	T–4th	
2001	Dickinson State	6–4	6–3	4th	
2002	Dickinson State	9–2	8–1	T–1st	L NAIA First Round
2003	Dickinson State	11–1	9–0	1st	L NAIA Quarterfinal
2004	Dickinson State	10–2	8–1	T–1st	L NAIA Quarterfinal
2005	Dickinson State	7–4	6–1	T–1st	
2006	Dickinson State	6–4	5–2	T–2nd	
2007	Dickinson State	3–7	3–4	T–4th	
2008	Dickinson State	7–4	7–0	1st	L NAIA First Round
2009	Dickinson State	7–4	7–0	1st	L NAIA First Round
2010	Dickinson State	9–2	6–1	1st	L NAIA First Round
2011	Dickinson State	4–6	3–3	2nd	
Dickinson State Blue Hawks (Frontier Conference) (2012–2013)
2012	Dickinson State	2–9	1–9	4th (East)	
2013	Dickinson State	1–10	0–10	8th	
Dickinson State:		258–121–1	173–72		
Total:		258–121–1			
National championship Conference title Conference division title or championship game berth

== See also ==
- List of college football career coaching wins leaders
- List of college football career coaching losses leaders
