= 2015 Marian Knights football team =

American college football season

2015 Marian Knights football

NAIA national champion

NAIA National Championship Game, W 31–14 vs. Southern Oregon
- Conference: Mid-States Football Association
- Mideast League
- Record: 12–2 (5–1 MSFA)
- Head coach: Mark Henninger (3rd season)

2015 Mid-States Football Association standings
| | Conf. | | | Overall |
| Team | W | | L | W | | L |
|---|---|---|---|---|---|---|
Mideast League
| No. 4 Saint Francis (IN) x^ | 6 | – | 0 | 11 | – | 1 |
| No. 1 Marian (IN) ^ | 5 | – | 1 | 12 | – | 2 |
| Taylor | 4 | – | 2 | 7 | – | 3 |
| Concordia (MI) | 2 | – | 4 | 5 | – | 6 |
| Siena Heights | 2 | – | 4 | 4 | – | 6 |
| Lindenwood–Belleville | 2 | – | 4 | 4 | – | 6 |
| Missouri Baptist | 0 | – | 6 | 0 | – | 10 |
Midwest League
| No. 18 St. Francis (IL) x | 4 | – | 1 | 8 | – | 3 |
| No. 12 Saint Xavier x^ | 4 | – | 1 | 7 | – | 4 |
| No. 20 St. Ambrose | 3 | – | 2 | 8 | – | 2 |
| Robert Morris (IL) | 3 | – | 2 | 6 | – | 4 |
| Olivet Nazarene | 1 | – | 4 | 3 | – | 8 |
| Trinity International | 0 | – | 5 | 2 | – | 9 |
x – League champion/co-champions ^ – NAIA playoff participant; Rankings from NAIA Coaches' Poll

The 2015 Marian Knights football team was an American football team that represented Marian University as a member of the Mid-States Football Association during the 2015 NAIA football season. In their third season under head coach Mark Henninger, the Knights compiled a 12–2 record (5–1 against conference opponents) and won the NAIA national championship, defeating Southern Oregon, 31–14, in the NAIA National Championship Game.

== Schedule ==
| Date | Opponent | Site | Result | Attendance | Source |
|---|---|---|---|---|---|
| August 29 | at Saint Xavier (IL)* | Chicago, IL | W 45–13 | 1,500 | |
| September 12 | Indianapolis* | Indianapolis, IN | W 28–22 | 5,105 | |
| September 19 | at Robert Morris (IL)* | Arlington Heights, IL | L 21–30 | 457 | |
| September 26 | Missouri Baptist^{†} | Indianapolis, IN | W 76–0 | 3,409 | |
| October 3 | St. Francis (IN) | Indianapolis, IN | L 42–45 | 2,712 | |
| October 10 | at Taylor | Upland, IN | W 36–23 | 4,307 | |
| October 17 | at Lindenwood-Belleville | Belleville, IL | W 69–13 | 259 | |
| October 31 | at Concordia (MI) | Ann Arbor, MI | W 44–0 | 850 | |
| November 7 | St. Francis (IL) | Indianapolis, IN | W 28–0 | 2,483 | |
| November 14 | Siena Heights | Indianapolis, IN | W 45–17 | 2,341 | |
| November 21 | Campbellsville | Indianapolis, IN | W 44–7 | 1,347 | |
| November 28 | at Grand View (IA) | Des Moines, IA (NAIA quarterfinal) | W 30–3 | 1,031 | |
| December 5 | at Saint Francis (IN) | Fort Wayne, IN (NAIA semifinal) | W 45–14 | 3,377 | |
| December 19 | vs. Southern Oregon | Daytona Beach Municipal Stadium; Daytona Beach, FL | W 31–14 | 3,500 | |
*Non-conference game; ^{†}Homecoming
