= Orlo Sundre =

American football coach

Biographical details
- Born: March 15, 1932 (age 94); North Dakota, U.S.

Coaching career (HC unless noted)

Football
- 1958: North Dakota (freshmen)
- 1961–1962: Ellendale
- 1963–1965: Mayville State
- 1966–1967: Dickinson State

Basketball
- 1959–1960: North Dakota (assistant)

Wrestling
- 1961–1963: Ellendale
- 1963–?: Mayville State

Track and field
- 1961–1963: Ellendale

Golf
- 1963–?: Mayville State

Tennis
- 1963–?: Mayville State

Head coaching record
- Overall: 4–27 (football)

Orlo Allen Sundre (born March 15, 1932) is an American former college football coach. He served as the head football coach at Ellendale State Teachers (later known as the North Dakota State Normal and Industrial School) in Ellendale, North Dakota from 1961 to 1962 and Dickinson State College (now known as Dickinson State University) in Dickinson, North Dakota from 1966 to 1967, compiling a career college football head coaching record of 4–27.

Sundre graduated from Mahnomen High School in Mahnomen, Minnesota and Mayville Teacher's College—now known as Mayville State University—in Mayville, North Dakota. He earned a master's degree from the University of North Dakota in 1960. At Ellendale, Sundre also was the head wrestling and track coach. He returned to Mayville State in 1963 as head coach in wrestling, golf, and tennis. He was also an assistant football coach at Mayville State for three seasons, from 1963 to 1965.

== Head coaching record ==
=== Football ===
Year	Team	Overall	Conference	Standing	Bowl/playoffs
Ellendale Dusties (North Dakota College Athletic Conference) (1961–1962)
1961	Ellendale	0–7	0–6	7th	
1962	Ellendale	1–7	0–6	7th	
Dickinson State:		1–14	0–12		
Dickinson State Savages (North Dakota College Athletic Conference) (1966–1967)
1966	Dickinson State	1–7	0–6	7th	
1967	Dickinson State	2–6	1–5	6th	
Dickinson State:		3–13	1–11		
Total:		4–27			
