= John R. Lasater =

United States Air Force general (1931–2017)

Brigadier General John R. Lasater

Second Quorum of the Seventy
- April 1, 1989 – October 3, 1992
- Called by: Ezra Taft Benson
- Successor: April 1, 1989 (aged 57) – October 3, 1992 (aged 60)
- End reason: Honorably released

First Quorum of the Seventy
- April 4, 1987 – April 1, 1989
- Called by: Ezra Taft Benson
- End reason: Transferred to Second Quorum of the Seventy

Military career
- 1952–1983
- Allegiance: United States of America
- Service/branch: United States Air Force
- Rank: Brigadier General
- Commands held: Strategic Air Command (SAC) 4th Air Division
- Battles/wars: Vietnam War
- Awards: Silver Star (2); Legion of Merit; Distinguished Flying Cross; Defense Meritorious Service Medal; Meritorious Service Medal (2); Air Medal (15); Air Force Commendation Medal; Presidential Unit Citation; Air Force Outstanding Unit Award; Combat Readiness Medal; Republic of Vietnam Gallantry Cross

Personal details
- Born: John Roger Lasater; December 8, 1931; Farmington, Utah, United States
- Died: June 14, 2017 (aged 85); North Ogden, Utah, United States
- Cause of death: Complications of Agent Orange exposure
- Resting place: Ogden City Cemetery
- Spouse(s): Marilyn Jones
- Children: 5
- Parents: Robert and Rowena Lasater

John Roger Lasater (December 8, 1931 – June 14, 2017) was a U.S. Air Force Brigadier General who served as a deputy assistant secretary of defense for European and North Atlantic Treaty Organization policy, the principal director for European and North Atlantic Treaty Organization policy, Office of the Assistant Secretary of Defense for International Security Policy, and as commander of the Strategic Air Command's 4th Air Division at Francis E. Warren Air Force Base, Wyoming. After his retirement from the Air Force in 1983, Lasater served as a general authority of the Church of Jesus Christ of Latter-day Saints (LDS Church) from 1987 to 1992.

== Background and education ==
Lasater was born in Farmington, Utah. He grew up in the Ogden, Utah area, graduating from Weber County High School in Ogden, and attended Brigham Young University, Provo, Utah. He graduated from the University of Omaha, Nebraska, with a bachelor's degree in political science in 1966, and earned his master's degree from the University of Southern California in Los Angeles, California in 1970. He completed Squadron Officer School in 1966 and graduated from the National War College, Fort Lesley J. McNair, Washington, D.C., in 1974.

== Military assignments ==
He enlisted in the U.S. Air Force in March 1952 and received his commission as a second lieutenant through the Air Force Officer Candidate School at Lackland Air Force Base, Texas, in March 1957.

His first operational flying assignment was in November 1958 with the 93rd Fighter-Interceptor Squadron at Kirtland Air Force Base, New Mexico.

In July 1960 he joined the 751st Aircraft Control and Warning Squadron at Mount Laguna Air Force Station, Californian, where he remained until December 1961.

Lasater began service in Southeast Asia in May 1967 where he flew RF-4C's with the 16th Tactical Reconnaissance Squadron, Tan Son Nhut Air Base, Republic of Vietnam. While there he completed 221 combat missions, 100 over North Vietnam, and compiled 485 combat hours. Following his Vietnam service he served in Europe (Great Britain and West Germany) in both tactical reconnaissance and tactical fighter units.

After graduation from the U.S. National War College in June 1974 he served as a special assistant for joint matters and chairman of the North Atlantic Treaty Organization Initiatives and Action Group in the Directorate of Plans and Policy, Headquarters U.S. Air Force, Washington, D.C. While in this position, he also served, beginning in March 1975, as chief of the Europe/North Atlantic Treaty Organization Division within the directorate. In April 1976 General Lasater was assigned as executive assistant to the deputy commander in chief, U.S. European Command, Stuttgart-Vaihingen, Germany.

From June 1978 to June 1979, he served as commander of the Strategic Air Command's 4th Air Division at Francis E. Warren Air Force Base, Wyoming. In addition to the 90th Strategic Missile Wing at Warren, the division included the 44th Strategic Missile Wing; the 28th Bombardment Wing at Ellsworth Air Force Base, South Dakota; and the 55th Strategic Reconnaissance Wing at Offutt Air Force Base, Nebraska.

General Lasater returned to Washington, D.C., as the senior military adviser to the U.S. Arms Control and Disarmament Agency of the State Department. He was also the acting U.S. Commissioner to the 19th and 20th U.S. and Union of Soviet Socialists Republics Standing Consultative commissions.

== Church service ==
=== General authority ===
In 1987, Lasater was called to serve as a member of the First Quorum of the Seventy. His assignments while a member of the Seventy included President of the North America Southeast Area and second counselor in the Europe Area Presidency.

=== Other church assignments ===
Prior to his retirement from the Air Force, Lasater served as a stake president over the Serviceman's Stake (Europe), effectively the spiritual leader of all American Latter-day Saint servicemen in Europe, all while serving as the executive assistant to the deputy commander in chief, U.S. European Command, in Stuttgart, Germany. After serving in this capacity for some time, he was released in 1976 and was called as a Regional Representative of the Twelve, until being reassigned to the Pentagon by the U.S. Air Force.

After retirement from the Air Force, Lasater became a mission president, presiding over the New Zealand Auckland Mission.

== Death ==
On June 14, 2017, Lasater died in his home in North Ogden, Utah, from complications of exposure to Agent Orange during the Vietnam War.

== Family ==
Lasater married the former Marilyn Jones of Samaria, Idaho. They are the parents of four daughters — Mary Lynn, Leslie Ann, Melanie, and Carolyn — and a son, Garth.
