= Bob Lasater =

American football coach

Coaching career (HC unless noted)
- 1972–1975: Dickinson State

Head coaching record
- Overall: 21–14–1

Accomplishments and honors

Championships
- 1 NDCAC (1975)

Bob Lasater is an American former football coach. Lasater was the 13th head football coach at Dickinson State College—now known as Dickinson State University–in Dickinson, North Dakota and held that position for four seasons, from 1972 until 1975. His coaching record at Dickinson State was 21–14–1.

== Head coaching record ==
Year	Team	Overall	Conference	Standing	Bowl/playoffs
Dickinson State Blue Hawks (North Dakota College Athletic Conference) (1972–1975)
1972	Dickinson State	2–7	1–4	5th	
1973	Dickinson State	5–3–1	3–2	3rd	
1974	Dickinson State	7–2	4–1	2nd	
1975	Dickinson State	7–2	4–1	T–1st	
Dickinson State:		21–14–1	12–8		
Total:		21–14–1			
National championship Conference title Conference division title or championship game berth
