= Beresford, South Dakota =

Beresford
- City
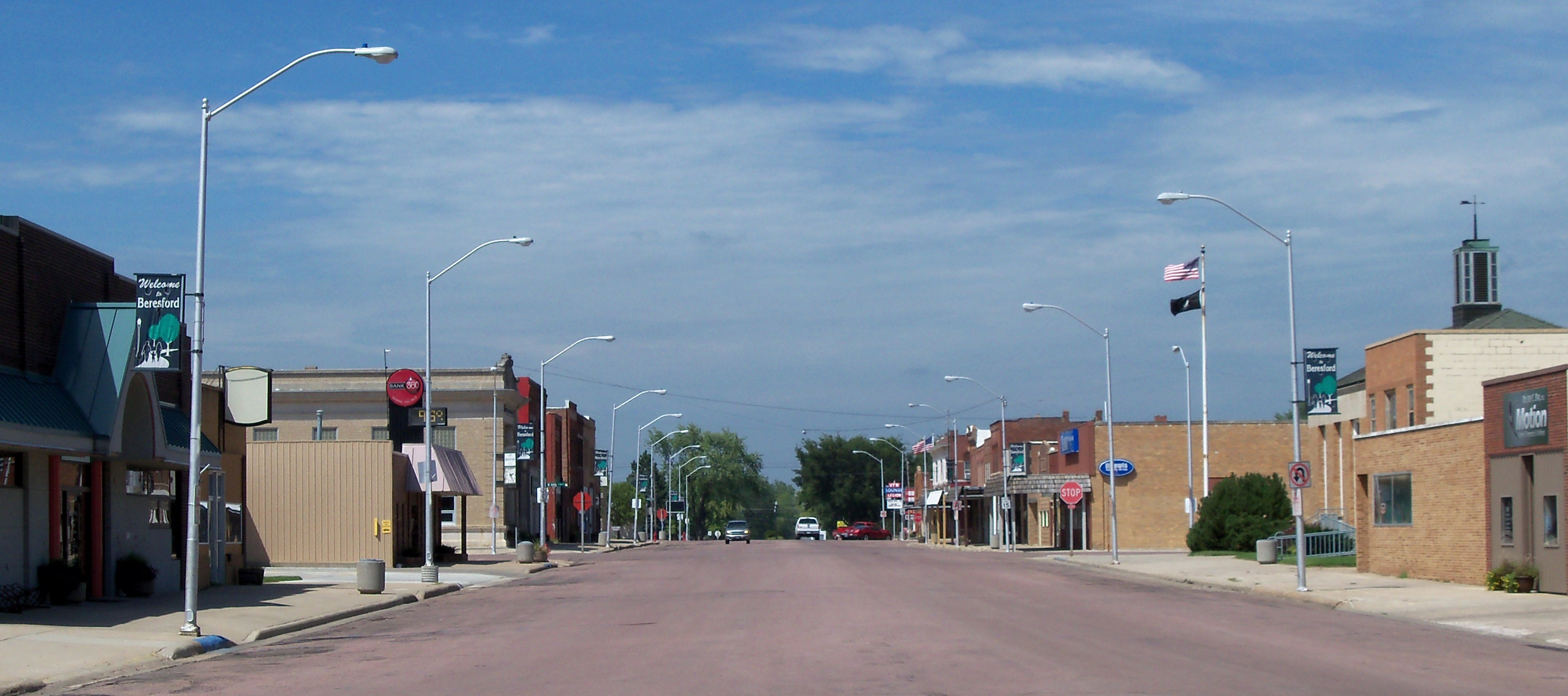
- Downtown Beresford, South Dakota

- Location in Union County and the state of South Dakota
- Coordinates: 43°04′47″N 96°46′49″W
- Country: United States
- State: South Dakota
- Counties: Union, Lincoln
- Incorporated: July 12, 1884

Area
  - Total: 1.78 sq mi (4.62 km^{2})
  - Land: 1.78 sq mi (4.62 km^{2})
  - Water: 0 sq mi (0.00 km^{2})
- Elevation: 1,496 ft (456 m)

Population (2020)
  - Total: 2,180
  - Density: 1,221.7/sq mi (471.71/km^{2})
- Time zone: UTC–6 (Central (CST))
  - Summer (DST): UTC–5 (CDT)
- ZIP code: 57004
- Area code: 605
- FIPS code: 46-04980
- GNIS feature ID: 1267283
- Sales tax: 6.2%
- Website: www.beresfordsd.com

Beresford (/ˈbɪərzfərd/; BEERZ-fərd) is a city in Lincoln and Union counties in the U.S. state of South Dakota. The population was 2,180 as of the 2020 census. The southern two-thirds is part of the Sioux City metropolitan area, while the northern one-third is part of the Sioux Falls metropolitan area. The Beresford Republic is the weekly newspaper.

== History ==
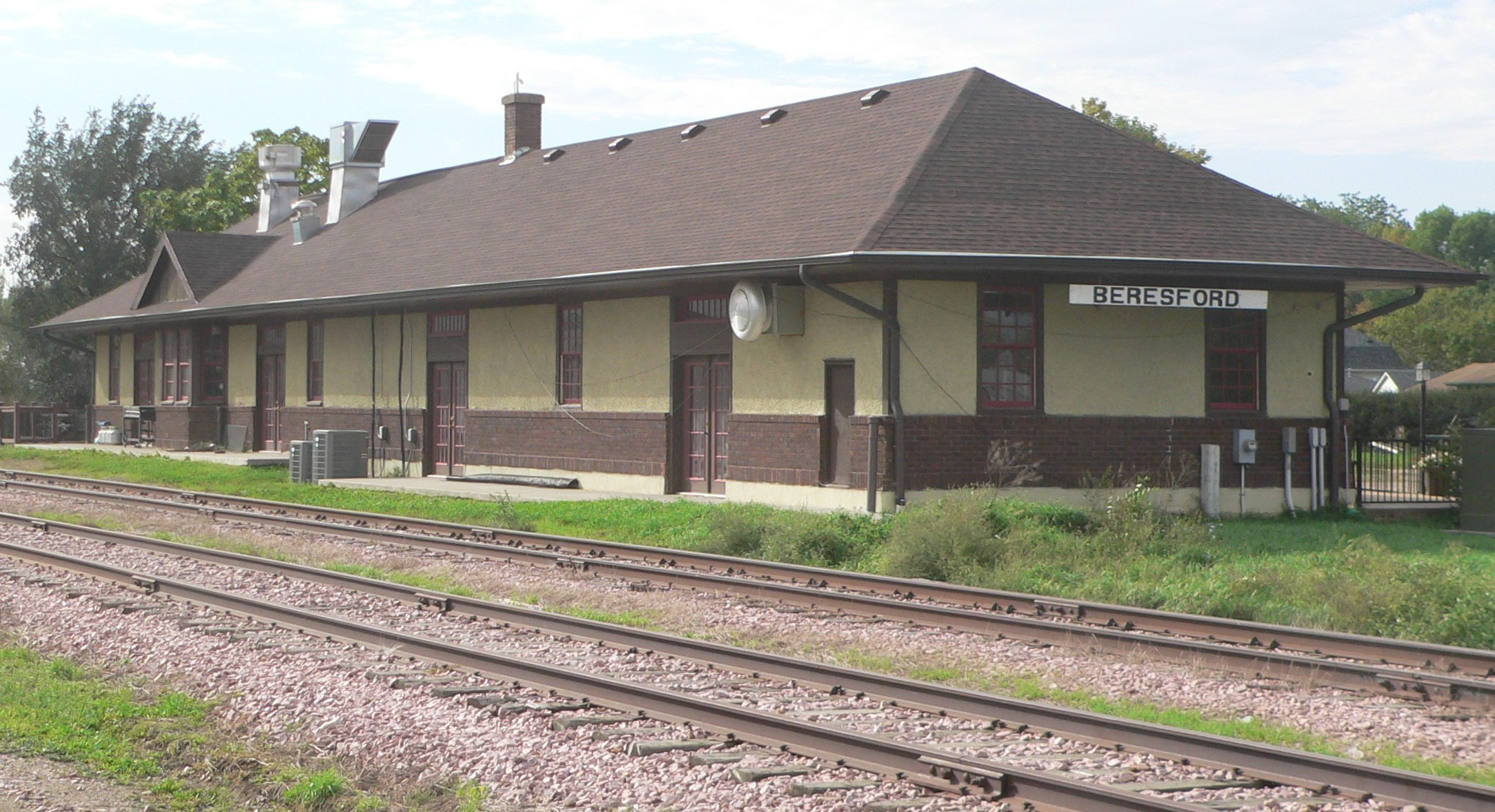
Former Beresford train station

Beresford was originally called Paris, and under the latter name was laid out in 1873. The city was renamed after Lord Charles Beresford and was formally incorporated on July 12, 1884.

Following the end of the Civil War, thousands of people settled in Dakota Territory during the years 1871 and 1872. If certain requirements (laid out in the Homestead Act of 1862) were met, the government gave title to the land to the homesteaders. Those who settled faced many hardships; however, by settling and starting farms to transform the land into a productive agricultural area.

In 1872, the family of Eli Ricard was the first to settle on a homestead in section five of Prairie Township of what is now Union County. This land became the original location of what is now the town of Beresford. As early as 1873, this small town known as Paris, Dakota Territory. Mr. Ricard operated the Paris Post Office from the frame house he built on his homestead.

In the fall of 1882, it became known that the Iroquois-Hawarden line of the Central division of the Chicago and North Western had built its grade to a point near the Big Sioux River and would be extending it through in the spring of 1883. It was also announced that a town would be established in the area at that time. Mr. Ricard was reported to have offered the rail road company 80 acres if they would build the railroad across the area where Paris was located. Subsequently, the railroad was built along Elie Ricard's claim. The surveyor laid out the plat of the town with the assistance of Patrick H. Farley, who helped carry the chain. Beresford was named after Lord Beresford by English capitalists interested in the railroad. The town was not formally incorporated until July 12, 1884.

In the spring of 1883, farmers pushed in to establish a number of businesses in Beresford. The first structure in the pioneer town was the saloon built and operated by D. C. Choquette. This structure was later destroyed by a fire. The second structure was a drug store built by G. S. Joscelyn on the west side of Third Street. This structure was later moved and used as a work shop; and, it was still standing as recently as 1934. The J. W. Reedy residence was believed to have been the first home built in Beresford. When J. N. Wass came to Beresford, he counted a total of seventeen structures.

There were a number of other pioneers in Beresford. J. R. Carleton established the “Beresford News” in 1883 and was the town's first newspaper editor. Charley Sundling was the first mail carrier. David Stephen was Beresford's first postmaster and first merchant. Eli Ricard was the first furniture dealer who also had a stock of coffins. W. J. Byrnes of Canton operated the first hotel. Beresford's first doctor was Dr. R. A. Hill. George Bruehler was the town's first harness maker. Lars Rasmussen operated the Beresford's first meat market. Jerry and J. L. Reedy operated the first hardware store. Walt Palmer and Mr. Churchill had Beresford's first livery stable. J. E. Sinclair was the first grain buyer. J. H. Queal and F. M. Slagle established Beresford's first lumber yards. Thomas Kane Miller was the first shoe cobbler and barber. C. R. Nylen worked for J. C. Jocelyn as Beresford's first pharmacist. Thomas Malloy was the first section boss. C. A. Potter was Beresford's first banker as well as founder of the town's first electric light plant, which failed due to a lack of funds. Morris and Tina Ryan owned and operated the city's first telephone exchange.

== Geography ==
According to the United States Census Bureau, the city has a total area of 1.78 square miles (4.61 km^{2}), all land.

Beresford is located on the border between Lincoln and Union counties; the border between the counties is located along Beresford's Cedar Street. Approximately two-thirds of Beresford's area (including its city hall building) is located in Union County.

== Demographics ==
Historical population
Census	Pop.	Note	%±
1890	494		—
1900	1,046		111.7%
1910	1,117		6.8%
1920	1,519		36.0%
1930	1,460		−3.9%
1940	1,642		12.5%
1950	1,686		2.7%
1960	1,794		6.4%
1970	1,655		−7.7%
1980	1,865		12.7%
1990	1,849		−0.9%
2000	2,006		8.5%
2010	2,005		0.0%
2020	2,180		8.7%
2022 (est.)	2,129		−2.3%
U.S. Decennial Census; 2020 Census

=== 2020 census ===
As of the 2020 census, Beresford had a population of 2,180. The median age was 38.8 years, 26.7% of residents were under the age of 18, and 20.1% were 65 years of age or older. For every 100 females there were 98.7 males, and for every 100 females age 18 and over there were 96.9 males age 18 and over.

0.0% of residents lived in urban areas, while 100.0% lived in rural areas.

There were 911 households in Beresford, of which 28.1% had children under the age of 18 living in them. Of all households, 49.0% were married-couple households, 19.0% were households with a male householder and no spouse or partner present, and 25.0% were households with a female householder and no spouse or partner present. About 33.8% of all households were made up of individuals and 17.3% had someone living alone who was 65 years of age or older.

There were 973 housing units, of which 6.4% were vacant. The homeowner vacancy rate was 3.8% and the rental vacancy rate was 2.5%.

Racial composition as of the 2020 census
Race	Number	Percent
White	2,001	91.8%
Black or African American	7	0.3%
American Indian and Alaska Native	20	0.9%
Asian	10	0.5%
Native Hawaiian and Other Pacific Islander	0	0.0%
Some other race	35	1.6%
Two or more races	107	4.9%
Hispanic or Latino (of any race)	103	4.7%

=== 2010 census ===
As of the census of 2010, there were 2,005 people, 861 households, and 561 families living in the city. The population density was 1,126.4 inhabitants per square mile (434.9/km^{2}). There were 959 housing units at an average density of 538.8 units per square mile (208.0 units/km^{2}). The racial makeup of the city was 98.5% White, 0.2% African American, 0.1% Native American, 0.2% Asian, 0.1% from other races, and 0.8% from two or more races. Hispanic or Latino of any race were 1.1% of the population.

There were 861 households, of which 29.6% had children under the age of 18 living with them, 54.8% were married couples living together, 7.0% had a female householder with no husband present, 3.4% had a male householder with no husband present, and 34.8% were non-families. 31.2% of all households were made up of individuals, and 15.7% had someone living alone who was 65 years of age or older. The average household size was 2.33 and the average family size was 2.92.

The median age in the city was 38.5 years. 25.4% of residents were under the age of 18; 6.3% were between the ages of 18 and 24; 26.2% were from 25 to 44; 22.9% were from 45 to 64; and 19.1% were 65 years of age or older. The gender makeup of the city was 49.4% male and 50.6% female.

=== 2000 census ===
As of the census of 2000, there were 2,006 people, 852 households, and 535 families living in the city. The population density was 1,130.1 inhabitants per square mile (436.3/km^{2}). There were 919 housing units at an average density of 517.7 units per square mile (199.9 units/km^{2}). The racial makeup of the city was 98.90% White, 0.55% Native American, 0.30% Asian, 0.05% from other races, and 0.20% from two or more races. Hispanic or Latino of any race were 0.40% of the population.

There were 852 households, out of which 29.6% had children under the age of 18 living with them, 52.5% were married couples living together, 7.2% had a female householder with no husband present, and 37.1% were non-families. 33.8% of all households were made up of individuals, and 19.7% had someone living alone who was 65 years of age or older. The average household size was 2.29 and the average family size was 2.94.

In the city, the population was spread out, with 24.3% under the age of 18, 9.6% from 18 to 24, 21.6% from 25 to 44, 22.3% from 45 to 64, and 22.1% who were 65 years of age or older. The median age was 39 years. For every 100 females, there were 90.0 males. For every 100 females age 18 and over, there were 87.2 males.

As of 2000 the median income for a household in the city was $35,331, and the median income for a family was $45,231. Males had a median income of $27,500 versus $19,057 for females. The per capita income for the city was $17,903. About 1.1% of families and 4.2% of the population were below the poverty line, including 0.8% of those under age 18 and 13.9% of those age 65 or over.

== Climate ==
Beresford is located very near to the center of the North American continent, far removed from any major bodies of water. This lends the area a humid continental climate, with hot, humid summers, cold snowy winters, and wide temperature extremes. Summers can bring daytime temperatures that climb into the 90s Fahrenheit, and winter lows can be well below zero.

== Education ==
Beresford High School is the only high school in the Beresford School District. The Beresford High School and Middle School are located on the South Campus of the Beresford School District, and the Beresford Elementary School is located at the North Campus, along with the Community Education Building, which houses the Beresford Pre-School Program.

Beresford High School recognizes the following sports: football, cross country, boys golf, girls golf, volleyball, wrestling, track, girls basketball, boys basketball, dance, and cheerleading. Beresford High School also recognizes the following non-athletic programs: marching band, concert band, drama, concert choir, All-State Chorus, All-State Band, Future Farmers of America, Family, Career and Community Leaders of America, school newspaper, school yearbook, quiz bowl, Students Working Against Tobacco, National Honor Society, Meals on Wheels, BEST Robotics, and Student Government.

=== Library ===
The Beresford Library was originally conceived and nurtured by the Beresford Study Club. In 1923, a committee was appointed to come up with the necessary planning and arrangements. At first, the club members were the ones who contributed books to the library via a book shower, which resulted in forty volumes of reference works as well as fiction. Not long after this, the public was invited to donate books to the collection, and this effort produced another hundred books. The study club started up a fund for the library foundation, and through various fundraising efforts accrued $300 for the purchase of more books. In 1924, both the size and popularity of the library were too much for the women of the study club to sponsor, so they appealed to the city attorney to see if the city would take over responsibility, and at the December meeting of the library board meeting that same year, it was officially announced that the city would take over the library.

The original library occupied a small area on the second floor of the fire station. As of 1959, there were approximately 10,000 volumes classified with the Dewey Decimal System. In 1963, with the help of the local Boy Scouts, the library moved to a new home in the former Post Office building. This was also the time when new forms of media were added to the collection, such as talking books, film strips, and movie projectors. In 1972, the library was expanded further by refurbishing the basement, which would house the youth library. By 1983, the library collection consisted of approximately 20,000 books and much media. The current library resides on 3rd Street, and was opened to the public in that venue in the fall of 1992. The library currently holds nearly 30,000 items.

== Notable people ==
- William J. Bulow, governor of South Dakota and U.S. senator
- Robert J. Casey, author and war correspondent
- Don Fedderson, television executive producer
- Vince Lloyd, baseball announcer for the Chicago Cubs
- Ernest Lundeen, U.S. senator from Minnesota
