= 1990 NAIA Division II football season =

American college football season

- Regular season: August–November 1990
- Postseason: November–December 1990
- National Championship: Caniglia Field; Omaha, NE
- Champions: Peru State

The 1990 NAIA Division II football season, as part of the 1990 college football season in the United States and the 35th season of college football sponsored by the NAIA, was the 21st season of play of the NAIA division II for football.

The season was played from August to November 1990 and culminated in the 1990 NAIA Division II Football National Championship, played in Omaha, Nebraska, near the campus of Peru State College.

The Peru State Bobcats defeated two-time defending champion Westminster Titans in the championship game, 17–7, to win their first NAIA national title.

== Conference standings ==
1990 Columbia Football Association standings
	Conf.					Overall
Team	W		L		T	W		L		T
Mount Hood League
No. 23 Southern Oregon x	6	–	0	–	0	6	–	3	–	0
Lewis & Clark	4	–	1	–	1	5	–	3	–	1
Willamette	3	–	3	–	0	4	–	5	–	0
Eastern Oregon	3	–	3	–	0	3	–	6	–	0
Pacific (OR)	2	–	3	–	1	3	–	5	–	1
Oregon Tech	1	–	5	–	0	1	–	8	–	0
Western Oregon	1	–	5	–	0	1	–	8	–	0
Mount Rainier League
No. 1 Central Washington x^	6	–	0	–	0	11	–	1	–	0
No. 6 Pacific Lutheran ^	5	–	1	–	0	9	–	2	–	0
No. 18 Linfield	4	–	2	–	0	7	–	2	–	0
Whitworth	3	–	3	–	0	6	–	3	–	0
Puget Sound	1	–	5	–	0	4	–	5	–	0
Western Washington	1	–	5	–	0	3	–	6	–	0
Simon Fraser	1	–	5	–	0	2	–	8	–	0
x – League champion/co-champions ^ – NAIA Division II playoff participant; Rankings from NAIA Division II poll

1990 Frontier Conference football standings
	Conf.					Overall
Team	W		L		T	W		L		T
Carroll (MT) $	5	–	1	–	0	6	–	3	–	0
Western Montana	3	–	3	–	0	5	–	3	–	0
Montana Tech	3	–	3	–	0	4	–	5	–	0
Rocky Mountain	1	–	5	–	0	2	–	8	–	0
$ – Conference champion

1990 Heart of America Athletic Conference football standings
	Conf.					Overall
Team	W		L		T	W		L		T
No. 9 Baker +^	6	–	1	–	0	10	–	2	–	0
No. 20 William Jewell +^	6	–	1	–	0	8	–	3	–	0
No. 14 Missouri Valley	5	–	2	–	0	8	–	2	–	0
Graceland	4	–	3	–	0	6	–	4	–	0
Evangel	3	–	4	–	0	4	–	6	–	0
Culver–Stockton	2	–	5	–	0	2	–	8	–	0
MidAmerica Nazarene	1	–	6	–	0	2	–	8	–	0
Tarkio	1	–	6	–	0	1	–	8	–	0
+ – Conference co-champions; ^ – NAIA Division II playoff participant; Rankings from NAIA Division II poll

1990 Illini–Badger–Hawkeye Football Conference standings
	Conf.					Overall
Team	W		L		T	W		L		T
No. 10 Concordia (WI) $^	7	–	0	–	0	9	–	1	–	0
No. 13 Greenville ^	6	–	1	–	0	8	–	2	–	0
Iowa Wesleyan	5	–	2	–	0	7	–	5	–	0
MacMurray	4	–	3	–	0	5	–	5	–	0
Eureka	3	–	4	–	0	5	–	5	–	0
Lakeland	2	–	5	–	0	2	–	6	–	0
Concordia (IL)	1	–	6	–	0	2	–	7	–	0
Blackburn	0	–	7	–	0	1	–	8	–	0
$ – Conference champion; ^ – NAIA Division II playoff participant; Rankings from NAIA Division II poll

1990 Indiana Collegiate Athletic Conference football standings
	Conf.					Overall
Team	W		L		T	W		L		T
DePauw $	7	–	0	–	0	8	–	2	–	0
Rose–Hulman	6	–	1	–	0	7	–	3	–	0
Hanover	4	–	3	–	0	6	–	4	–	0
Wabash	4	–	3	–	0	4	–	5	–	0
Anderson (IN)	3	–	4	–	0	3	–	7	–	0
Taylor	2	–	5	–	0	5	–	5	–	0
Franklin (IN)	2	–	5	–	0	4	–	6	–	0
Manchester	0	–	7	–	0	1	–	9	–	0
$ – Conference champion

1990 Kansas Collegiate Athletic Conference football standings
	Conf.					Overall
Team	W		L		T	W		L		T
No. 11 St. Mary of the Plains +^	8	–	1	–	0	9	–	2	–	0
No. 17 Bethany (KS) +^	8	–	1	–	0	8	–	2	–	0
Friends	7	–	2	–	0	8	–	2	–	0
Southwestern (KS)	6	–	3	–	0	6	–	4	–	0
Kansas Wesleyan	5	–	4	–	0	6	–	4	–	0
Ottawa	5	–	4	–	0	5	–	5	–	0
Bethel (KS)	2	–	7	–	0	3	–	7	–	0
McPherson	2	–	7	–	0	3	–	7	–	0
Sterling	1	–	8	–	0	1	–	9	–	0
Tabor	1	–	8	–	0	1	–	9	–	0
+ – Conference co-champions; ^ – NAIA Division II playoff participant; Rankings from NAIA Division II poll

1990 Mid-South Conference football standings
	Conf.					Overall
Team	W		L		T	W		L		T
No. 8 Georgetown (KY) $^	5	–	0	–	0	9	–	2	–	0
No. 24 Cumberland (KY)	4	–	1	–	0	7	–	2	–	1
Campbellsville	3	–	2	–	0	8	–	2	–	0
Union (KY)	1	–	4	–	0	5	–	5	–	0
Evansville	1	–	4	–	0	3	–	7	–	0
Tennessee Wesleyan	1	–	4	–	0	3	–	7	–	0
Lambuth *	0	–	0	–	0	2	–	7	–	0
Cumberland (TN) *	0	–	0	–	0	0	–	8	–	0
$ – Conference champion; ^ – NAIA Division II playoff participant * – ineligible for conference title; Rankings from NAIA Division II poll

1990 Nebraska Intercollegiate Athletic Conference football standings
	Conf.					Overall
Team	W		L		T	W		L		T
No. 16 Nebraska Wesleyan +	4	–	1	–	0	7	–	2	–	0
Midland +	4	–	1	–	0	5	–	4	–	0
Hastings	3	–	2	–	0	3	–	6	–	0
Doane	2	–	3	–	0	3	–	7	–	0
Dana	1	–	3	–	1	3	–	6	–	1
Concordia (NE)	0	–	4	–	1	1	–	7	–	1
$ – Conference champion; Rankings from NAIA Division II poll

1990 North Dakota College Athletic Conference football standings
	Conf.					Overall
Team	W		L		T	W		L		T
No. 21 Mayville State +	4	–	1	–	0	8	–	1	–	0
No. 12 Dickinson State +^	4	–	1	–	0	9	–	2	–	0
Valley City State	3	–	2	–	0	6	–	3	–	0
Minot State	2	–	3	–	0	4	–	5	–	0
Mary	1	–	4	–	0	4	–	5	–	0
Jamestown	1	–	4	–	0	2	–	7	–	0
+ – Conference co-champions; ^ – NAIA Division II playoff participant; Rankings from NAIA Division II poll

1990 South Dakota Intercollegiate Conference football standings
	Conf.					Overall
Team	W		L		T	W		L		T
Black Hills State $	5	–	0	–	0	5	–	4	–	0
Sioux Falls	3	–	2	–	0	6	–	4	–	0
Dakota Wesleyan	3	–	2	–	0	4	–	6	–	0
Huron	3	–	2	–	0	3	–	7	–	0
Dakota State	1	–	4	–	0	4	–	5	–	0
South Dakota Tech	0	–	5	–	0	0	–	9	–	0
$ – Conference champion

1990 Texas Intercollegiate Athletic Association football standings
	Conf.					Overall
Team	W		L		T	W		L		T
No. 2 Tarleton State $^	6	–	0	–	0	11	–	1	–	0
No. 15 Austin ^	4	–	2	–	0	8	–	3	–	0
Howard Payne	3	–	3	–	0	5	–	5	–	0
Midwestern State	3	–	3	–	0	3	–	7	–	0
Sul Ross	2	–	4	–	0	3	–	6	–	0
Hardin–Simmons	2	–	4	–	0	3	–	6	–	0
McMurry	1	–	5	–	0	1	–	9	–	0
$ – Conference champion; ^ – NAIA Division II playoff participant; Rankings from NAIA Division II poll

1990 Tri-State Athletic Conference football standings
	Conf.					Overall
Team	W		L		T	W		L		T
No. 5 Peru State $^	3	–	0	–	0	12	–	0	–	1
Northwestern (IA)	2	–	1	–	0	5	–	5	–	0
No. 22 Westmar	1	–	2	–	0	8	–	2	–	0
Benedictine (KS)	0	–	3	–	0	4	–	6	–	0
$ – Conference champion; ^ – NAIA Division II playoff participant; Rankings from NAIA Division II poll

1990 Wisconsin State University Conference football standings
	Conf.					Overall
Team	W		L		T	W		L		T
Wisconsin–Whitewater $^	8	–	0	–	0	10	–	1	–	0
No. 4 Wisconsin–La Crosse *	7	–	1	–	0	9	–	2	–	0
Wisconsin–Platteville	5	–	3	–	0	7	–	3	–	0
Wisconsin–Stevens Point	4	–	4	–	0	6	–	4	–	0
Wisconsin–River Falls	3	–	4	–	1	5	–	4	–	1
Wisconsin–Oshkosh	3	–	4	–	1	4	–	5	–	1
Wisconsin–Stout	3	–	5	–	0	4	–	6	–	0
Wisconsin–Eau Claire	1	–	7	–	0	2	–	8	–	0
Wisconsin–Superior	1	–	7	–	0	1	–	8	–	0
$ – Conference champion; ^ – NCAA Division III playoff participant; * – NAIA Division II playoff participant; Rankings from NAIA Division II poll

1990 NAIA Division II independents football records
	Conf.			Overall
Team	W	L	T	W		L		T
No. 3 Westminster (PA) ^		–		11	–	2	–	0
No. 7 Chadron State ^		–		9	–	2	–	0
No. 19 Findlay		–		7	–	2	–	1
Azusa Pacific		–		6	–	3	–	0
Lindenwood		–		6	–	4	–	0
Trinity (IL)		–		6	–	4	–	0
No. 25 St. Francis (IL)		–		5	–	4	–	0
Geneva		–		5	–	5	–	0
St. Ambrose		–		3	–	7	–	1
Tiffin		–		1	–	8	–	1
Mount St. Joseph		–		1	–	9	–	0
Oklahoma Panhandle State		–		1	–	9	–	0
^ – NAIA Division II playoff participant; Rankings from NAIA Division II poll

== Conference champions ==
Conference	Champion	Record
Columbia	Mount Rainier League: Central Washington; Mount Hood League: Southern Oregon	6–0; 6–0
Frontier	Carroll (MT)	5–1
Heart of America	William Jewell; Baker (KS)	6–1
Kansas	Bethany; St. Mary of the Plains	8–1
Mid-South	Georgetown (KY)	5–0
Nebraska	Midland; Nebraska Wesleyan	4–1
North Dakota	Dickinson State; Mayville State	4–1
South Dakota	Black Hills State	5–0
Texas	Tarleton State	6–0

== Rankings ==
Final NAIA Division II poll rankings:

Rank	Team (first place votes)	Record (thru Nov. 11)	Points
1	Central Washington (18)	9–0	474
2	Tarleton State (1)	9–0	448
3	Westminster (PA)	8–1	427
4	Wisconsin–La Crosse	9–1	411
5	Peru State	8–0–1	397
6	Pacific Lutheran	8–1	367
7	Chadron State	9–1	351
8	Georgetown (KY)	8–1	346
9	Baker	8–1	339
10	Concordia (WI)	9–0	283
11	St. Mary of the Plains	9–1	265
12	Dickinson State	8–1	242
13	Greenville	8–1	231
14	Missouri Valley	8–2	213
15	Austin	8–2	207
16	Nebraska Wesleyan	7–2	217
17	Bethany (KS)	8–1	179
18	Linfield	7–2	155
19	Findlay	7–2	141
20	William Jewell	7–2	130
21	Mayville State	8–1	114
22	Westmar	8–2	95
23	Southern Oregon	6–3	61
24	Cumberland (KY)	7–2	32
25	St. Francis (IL)	5–4	23

== Postseason ==
First Round; Campus sites
Baker	55
Bethany*	7
Austin	23
William Jewell* (OT)	26
Chadron State	3
Dickinson State*	28
Wisconsin–La Crosse	3
Peru State*	24
Greenville (IL)	13
Central Washington*	43
Pacific Lutheran	37
Concordia (WI)*	9
St. Mary of the Plains	14
Tarleton State*	24
Georgetown (KY)	13
Westminster (PA)*	47

Quarterfinals; Campus sites
Baker	56
William Jewell*	29
Dickinson State*	34
Peru State	38
Central Washington ‡	24
Pacific Lutheran	6
Tarleton State*	17
Westminster (PA)	19

Semifinals; Campus sites
Baker	3
Peru State ‡‡	27
Central Washington	17
Westminster (PA)*	24

Championship; Omaha, NE
Peru State	17
Westminster (PA)	7

- ‡ Game played at Puyallup, Washington
- ‡‡ Game played at Omaha, Nebraska

== See also ==
- 1990 NCAA Division I-A football season
- 1990 NCAA Division I-AA football season
- 1990 NCAA Division II football season
- 1990 NCAA Division III football season
