= Belgrade High School (Montana) =

School in Belgrade, Montana, U.S.

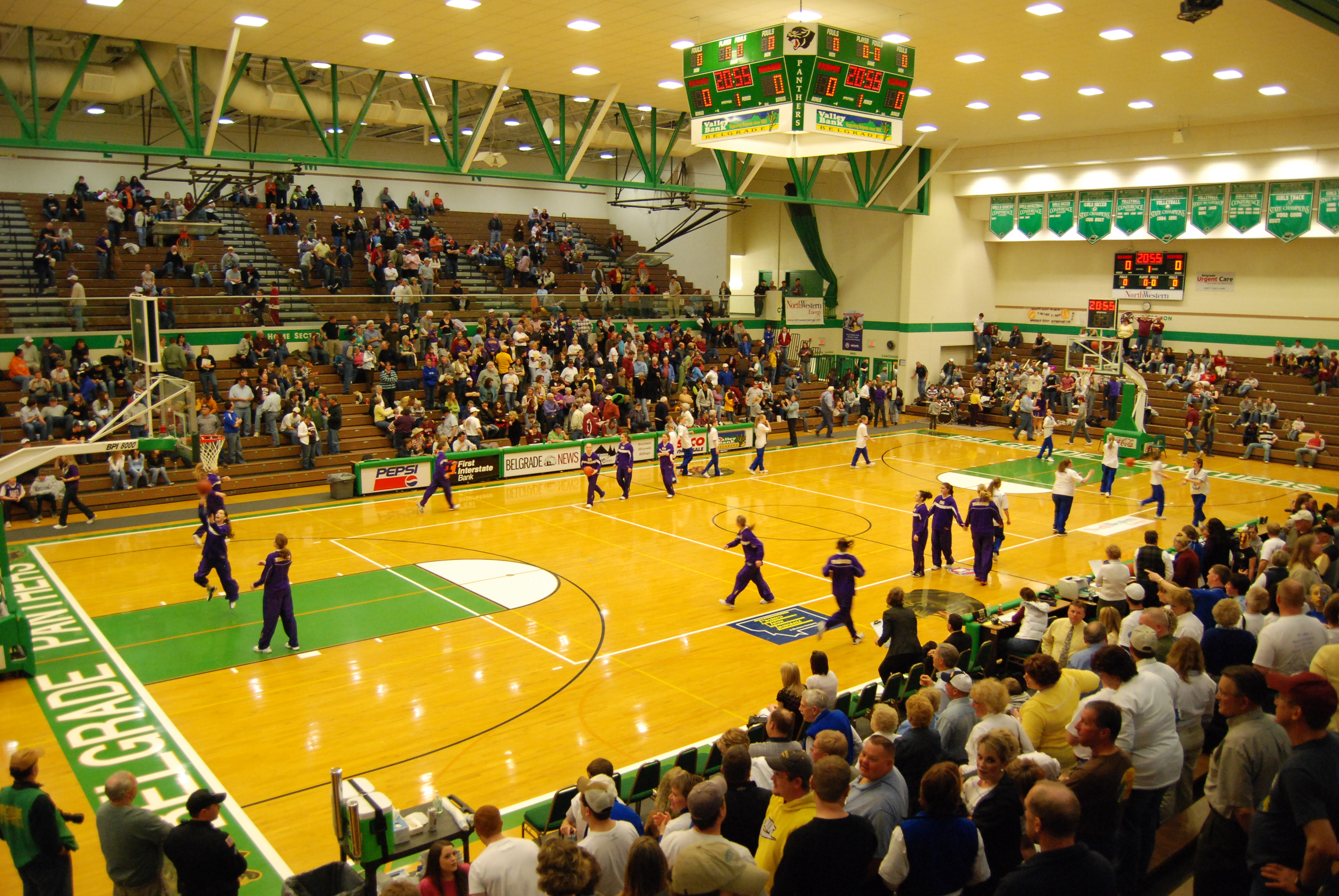
- Belgrade High School's gym in 2008.

Location
- 303 N Hoffman St, Belgrade, MT 59714; Gallatin County; 45°46′53.54″N 111°10′42.71″W

Information
- Established: c. 1963
- Superintendent: Dede Frothingham
- Principal: Shanna Smith
- Colors: Kelly green and white
- Mascot: Panther
- Website: hs.bsd44.org

Belgrade High School is a public high school in Belgrade, Montana with grades 9 through 12. The school is part of the Belgrade School District. As of the 2022–23 school year, Belgrade High School has an enrollment of 994 students, with a student to teacher ratio of 15:1. The school was built in 1963. Belgrade High School's superintendent is Dede Frothingham and their principal is Shanna Smith.

== Athletics ==
Belgrade High School's mascot is the Panther and the school participates in MHSA Class AA sports. The school's colors are Kelly green and white. Belgrade High School is the only Montana school to move from Class C sports to Class AA.

As of May 2024, the Belgrade High School Panthers have won 24 championships across multiple sports. The school won their first championship in 1949, defeating Valier High School in eight-man football by a score of 44 to 13. Belgrade High School's most recent championship was in 2021, when the school defeated Billings Senior in softball 5–3. The team, recently, in 2023, played its first season of high school baseball.

=== Championships ===
Year	Sport	Class
1949	Eight-man football	C
1956	Basketball (boys)	C
1958	Basketball (boys)	C
1973	Football	B
1977	Football	B
1978	Football	B
1979	Track and field (boys)	B
1984	Volleyball	B
1991	Volleyball	A
2002	Track and field (girls)	A
2005	Soccer (girls)	A
2006	Track and field (girls)	A
2007	Soccer (girls)	A
2007	Track and field (girls)	A
2009	Track and field (girls)	A
2012-13	Golf (boys)	A
2014	Volleyball	A
2016	Soccer (boys)	A
2017	Soccer (boys)	A
2017	Softball	A
2017	Track and field (girls)	A
2018	Softball	A
2019	Softball	A
2021	Softball	AA
