= Beresford High School =

Location
- 301 West Maple St. Beresford, SD 57004; U.S.
- Coordinates: 43.075°N 96.7775°W

Information
- Type: Public
- School district: Beresford School District 61-2
- Superintendent: Dustin Degen
- Principal: Dustin Degen
- Staff: 15.14 (FTE)
- Grades: 9-12
- Student to teacher ratio: 14.46
- Colors: Purple and white
- Athletics: Baseball, basketball, cheerleading, cross country, dance, football, golf, track & field, volleyball, wrestling
- Athletics conference: Big Sioux Conference
- Mascot: Watchdogs
- Newspaper: Beresonian
- School Song: Washington and Lee Swing
- Website: beresford.k12.sd.us

Beresford High School is the main secondary school for grades 9-12 located in Beresford, South Dakota. It is the only high school in the Beresford School District 61–2. The school colors are gold and silver. The school mascot is the watchdog. The school newspaper is the Beresonian.

The following sports are played at the school: football, cross country, boys golf, girls golf, volleyball, wrestling, track, girls basketball, boys basketball, dance, and cheerleading. There are also the following non-athletic programs: marching, band, drama, concert choir, all-state chorus, all-state band, Future of America, Career and Community of America, school.
