= Tri-State Athletic Conference =

The Tri-State Athletic Conference was a short-lived intercollegiate athletic conference that existed from 1988 to 1990. The league had members, as its name suggests, in three states: Iowa, Nebraska, and Kansas.

== Football champions ==
- 1988 – Northwestern (IA)
- 1989 – Peru State
- 1990 – Peru State

== See also ==
- List of defunct college football conferences
