= Dickinson State University =

Public university in Dickinson, North Dakota, US

Coordinates: 46°52′58″N 102°48′01″W

- Former names: Dickinson State Normal School (1918–1931); Dickinson State Teachers College (1931–1963); North Dakota State College (1963–1964); Dickinson State College (1964–1965); State University of North Dakota at Dickinson (1965–1987)
- Motto: Small Community. Big Opportunity.
- Type: Public university
- Established: 1918; 108 years ago
- Parent institution: North Dakota University System
- Academic affiliations: Space-grant
- Endowment: $8.9 million
- President: Scott Molander
- Faculty: 63
- Administrative staff: 212
- Students: 1,392
- Location: Dickinson, North Dakota, U.S.
- Campus: Urban, 110 acres (45 ha)
- Colors: Navy Blue & Gray
- Nickname: Blue Hawks
- Sporting affiliations: NAIA – Frontier
- Mascot: Buster Blue Hawk
- Website: dickinsonstate.edu
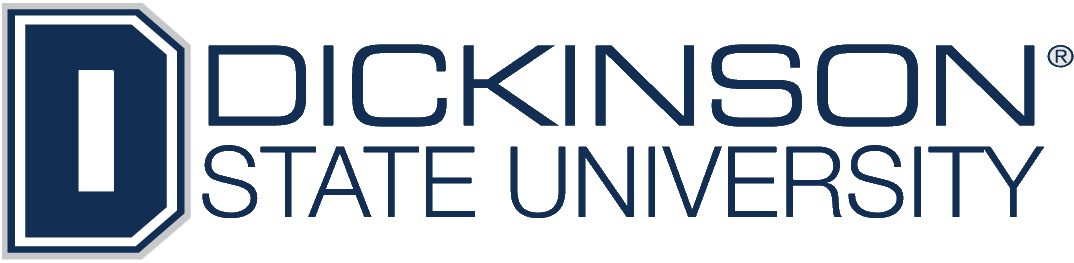

Dickinson State University (DSU) is a public university in Dickinson, North Dakota, United States. It is part of the North Dakota University System. It was founded in 1918 as Dickinson State Normal School and granted full university status in 1987.

== History ==
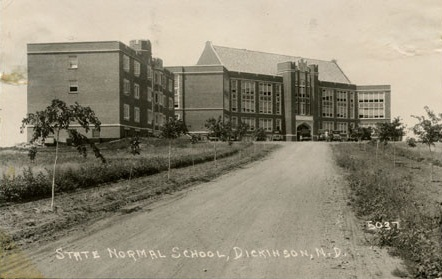
May and Stickney Halls at the State Normal School, 1924

Dickinson State was established as a normal school to fill a need for qualified teachers in rural western North Dakota, where fewer than one-quarter of the people working as teachers in the early 1900s were certified as teachers. The university considers June 24, 1918, to be its founding date; this was the first day of classes for the Dickinson Normal School. When first established, the school was tuition-free and operated in the facilities of Dickinson High School.

The first campus building, May Hall, was built in 1924.

During World War II, Dickinson State Teachers College was one of 131 colleges and universities nationally that took part in the V-12 Navy College Training Program which offered students a path to a Navy commission.

=== Enrollment and graduation controversies ===
In 2011 and 2012, Dickinson State attracted negative attention for some of its academic and business practices. In 2011, the university was discovered to have overstated its enrollments by practices such as counting people as students who had merely attended a conference on the campus. This situation resulted in the dismissal of the university president, Richard J. McCallum.

A North Dakota University System audit report released in February 2012 found that the school had relaxed standards and waived some requirements to increase enrollment of foreign students and had, over a period of several years, awarded degrees to 584 foreign students who had not completed the required coursework. The report was a followup of an earlier meeting between Dickinson officials and the Higher Learning Commission at which the DSU officials "realized they may have an issue with one or more of the HLC's requirements surrounding academic agreements". Most of the university's foreign students came from China, where the university employed recruiting agents who falsely claimed to be university employees and sometimes misrepresented the university's programs. News media accounts described the audit report as depicting Dickinson State as a degree mill.

The audit had been requested by the university's president, Douglas Coston, who took office as Interim President in August 2011, after some university international agreements were found not to conform with requirements of the North Dakota State Board of Higher Education and the Higher Learning Commission. On the day of the audit release, the Dean of Education, Doug LaPlante, committed suicide. Six months later, in July, Dickinson's regional accreditor, the Higher Learning Commission (HLC), placed the university "on notice," requiring the university provide detailed responses to concerns found in the accreditor's recent site visit. That status was removed three years later when HLC renewed DSU's accreditation for ten years.

=== Financial challenges ===
In 2023, the university eliminated seven degree programs to address ongoing financial challenges. This included firing tenured faculty in those programs. The university's decisions and actions were met with protests from faculty and others. University leaders also reorganized parts of the university and eliminated other positions. The following year, the university changed its academic policies to increase class sizes and require faculty to teach more students. In response, all seven faculty members in the university's nursing program resigned, protesting that the new policies are unworkable in their program. The university was already under scrutiny by the program's accreditor, the Accreditation Commission for Education in Nursing, and the state's board of nursing did not approve president Eaton's plan for hiring new faculty. He subsequently announced his plans to resign and Dickinson's nursing program partnered with Mayville State University to continue Dickinson's nursing program.

== Academics ==
Undergraduate demographics as of Fall 2023
Race and ethnicity	Total
White	77%
Hispanic	9%
Two or more races	4%
International student	3%
American Indian/Alaska Native	2%
Black	2%
Unknown	2%
Asian	1%
Native Hawaiian/Pacific Islander	1%
Economic diversity
Low-income (Note: The percentage of students who received an income-based federal Pell grant intended for low-income students.)	27%
Affluent (Note: The percentage of students who are a part of the American middle class at the bare minimum.)	73%

Dickinson State offers bachelor's degrees in more than 75 fields of study through 10 academic departments. The university also offers certificates and associate degrees. However, it specializes in business management, teacher education, and nursing. Most students attending DSU are business management majors although education (both elementary and secondary), nursing, natural science, and agriculture majors constitute significant areas of study. There is also opportunity for pre-professional study and vocational training in selected areas.

Student programs are based on a core of General Education courses, including fine arts, humanities, natural sciences, mathematics, and the social and behavioral sciences. Dickinson State University students are encouraged to complete their general education requirements by the end of the sophomore year. Students are then free as juniors and seniors to explore a major field of study.

=== Accreditation ===
Dickinson State University is accredited by the Higher Learning Commission. Although the university was placed "on notice" in July 2012 it was removed from that status in October 2013 and is fully accredited.

== Athletics ==
The Dickinson State athletic teams are called the Blue Hawks. The university is a member of the National Association of Intercollegiate Athletics (NAIA), primarily competing in the Frontier Conference for most of its sports since the 2025–26 academic year; while its men's and women’s wrestling team competes in the Heart of America Athletic Conference (HAAC). The Blue Hawks previously competed in the NSAA from 2014–15 to 2024–25; an NAIA Independent within the Association of Independent Institutions (AII) during the 2011–12 school year; and in these defunct conferences: the Dakota Athletic Conference (DAC) from 2000–01 to 2010–11; and the North Dakota College Athletic Conference (NDCAC) from 1931–32 to 1999–2000. The team was known as the Savages until 1972 when they changed their name to the Blue Hawks.

Dickinson State competes in 16 intercollegiate varsity sports: Men's sports include baseball, basketball, cross country, football, golf, track & field and wrestling; while women's sports include basketball, cross country, golf, softball, track & field, wrestling, and volleyball; and co-ed sports include cheerleading, eSports and rodeo.

Henry Biesiot is a former football coach and was one of the few active coaches at the college level with 200 or more wins and 30 or more seasons. Biesiot led the Blue Hawks to the NAIA semifinals in 1991. The women's volleyball team won the school's first national championship in 2000. The men's track and field team won NAIA national championships three consecutive years from 2004 to 2006 under coach Pete Stanton. They were national runner up five other times in the eight-year period from 2003 to 2010.

== Communications ==
DSU News covers current happenings among DSU related students and staff.

== Theodore Roosevelt Presidential Library ==
On April 30, 2013, both chambers of the North Dakota Legislative Assembly passed a bill appropriating $12 million to Dickinson State University to award a grant to the Theodore Roosevelt Center for construction of a building to be named the Theodore Roosevelt Presidential Library. To access these funds, the Theodore Roosevelt Center must first raise $3 million from non-state sources. Dickinson State University is also home to the Theodore Roosevelt Digital Library which has formed partnerships with the Library of Congress and Harvard University, among other institutions. They currently have over 25,000 items online. The library building was instead built 30 miles west of Dickinson, near the Theodore Roosevelt National Park and the city of Medora, where Theodore Roosevelt himself ranched in the area.

== Notable alumni ==
- Derrick Atkins, athlete
- Trevor Barry, athlete
- Aaron Cleare – athlete
- Edward Lone Fight – Tribal leader and educator – 1964
- Adrian Griffith – athlete
- Jill McLain – Miss Montana USA – 2006
- Jamalcolm Liggins, athlete
- Ramon Miller, athlete
- La'Sean Pickstock, athlete
- Solo Sikoa – professional wrestler – 2016
- Chris Walby – athlete – 1981

== See also ==
- Dickinson State Normal School Campus District, listed on the National Register of Historic Places
