= List of NAIA Division II football independents standings =

This is a list of yearly National Association of Intercollegiate Athletics (NAIA) Division II independents football records.

== NAIA Division II standings ==
1970 NAIA Division II independents football records
	Conf.			Overall
Team	W	L	T	W		L		T
No. 1 Westminster (PA) ^		–		10	–	0	–	0
No. 6 Simon Fraser		–		8	–	0	–	0
No. T–20 Frostburg State		–		7	–	1	–	0
No. 7 Cal Lutheran		–		8	–	1	–	1
Franklin (IN)		–		7	–	3	–	0
Georgetown (KY)		–		6	–	3	–	0
Eureka		–		5	–	3	–	0
Grove City		–		5	–	3	–	1
Iowa Wesleyan		–		5	–	4	–	0
Waynesburg		–		5	–	4	–	0
Texas Lutheran		–		5	–	4	–	1
Azusa Pacific		–		3	–	5	–	0
Oklahoma Panhandle State		–		4	–	7	–	0
Austin		–		3	–	6	–	0
Missouri Southern		–		2	–	7	–	1
Geneva		–		1	–	8	–	0
Missouri Western		–		1	–	8	–	0
^ – NAIA Division II playoff participant; Rankings from NAIA Division II poll

1971 NAIA Division II independents football records
	Conf.			Overall
Team	W	L	T	W		L		T
No. 1 Cal Lutheran ^		–		8	–	0	–	2
No. 2 Westminster (PA) ^		–		8	–	1	–	1
Iowa Wesleyan		–		7	–	1	–	1
Geneva		–		7	–	2	–	0
Missouri Southern		–		7	–	3	–	0
Simon Fraser		–		7	–	3	–	0
Earlham		–		6	–	3	–	0
Franklin (IN)		–		5	–	5	–	0
Oklahoma Panhandle State		–		5	–	6	–	0
Texas Lutheran		–		5	–	6	–	0
Azusa Pacific		–		4	–	5	–	0
Eureka		–		3	–	5	–	1
Grove City		–		2	–	6	–	1
Missouri Western		–		2	–	7	–	0
Waynesburg		–		2	–	7	–	0
Austin		–		1	–	8	–	0
Georgetown (KY)		–		1	–	8	–	0
^ – NAIA Division II playoff participant; Rankings from NAIA Division II poll

1972 NAIA Division II independents football records
	Conf.			Overall
Team	W	L	T	W		L		T
No. 1 Missouri Southern ^		–		12	–	0	–	0
No. 12 Geneva		–		8	–	1	–	0
No. 7 Westminster (PA)		–		7	–	1	–	0
No. 4 Franklin (IN) ^		–		8	–	3	–	0
Cal Lutheran		–		5	–	5	–	0
Simon Fraser		–		4	–	5	–	0
Eureka		–		2	–	5	–	1
Missouri Western		–		3	–	7	–	0
Texas Lutheran		–		3	–	7	–	0
Iowa Wesleyan		–		2	–	6	–	1
Azusa Pacific		–		2	–	7	–	0
Georgetown (KY)		–		2	–	7	–	0
Austin		–		1	–	8	–	0
Waynesburg		–		1	–	8	–	0
Grove City		–		0	–	8	–	0
Oklahoma Panhandle State		–		0	–	11	–	0
^ – NAIA Division II playoff participant; Rankings from NAIA Division II poll

1973 NAIA Division II independents football records
	Conf.			Overall
Team	W	L	T	W		L		T
No. 6 Westminster (PA)		–		7	–	1	–	0
No. 18 Simon Fraser		–		6	–	2	–	0
Texas Lutheran		–		7	–	3	–	0
Cal Lutheran		–		6	–	4	–	0
Azusa Pacific		–		5	–	4	–	0
Franklin (IN)		–		5	–	4	–	0
Missouri Western		–		4	–	5	–	1
Geneva		–		4	–	5	–	0
Missouri Southern		–		4	–	6	–	0
Austin		–		3	–	5	–	1
Iowa Wesleyan		–		3	–	5	–	0
Waynesburg		–		3	–	5	–	0
Benedictine (KS)		–		3	–	6	–	0
Eureka		–		3	–	6	–	0
Georgetown (KY)		–		3	–	6	–	0
Oklahoma Panhandle State		–		3	–	7	–	1
Rankings from NAIA Division II poll

1974 NAIA Division II independents football records
	Conf.			Overall
Team	W	L	T	W		L		T
No. 1 Texas Lutheran ^		–		11	–	0	–	0
No. 5 Cal Lutheran		–		9	–	1	–	0
Georgetown (KY)		–		7	–	2	–	0
No. 12 Westminster (PA)		–		7	–	2	–	0
Missouri Southern		–		6	–	3	–	0
Waynesburg		–		6	–	3	–	0
Simon Fraser		–		4	–	4	–	0
Franklin (IN)		–		4	–	6	–	0
Azusa Pacific		–		3	–	6	–	0
Eureka		–		3	–	6	–	0
Missouri Western		–		3	–	7	–	0
Oklahoma Panhandle State		–		3	–	8	–	0
Austin		–		2	–	6	–	1
Benedictine (KS)		–		2	–	7	–	0
Geneva		–		1	–	8	–	0
Iowa Wesleyan		–		0	–	9	–	0
^ – NAIA Division II playoff participant; Rankings from NAIA Division II poll

1975 NAIA Division II independents football records
	Conf.			Overall
Team	W	L	T	W		L		T
No. 1 Texas Lutheran ^		–		11	–	1	–	0
No. 2 Cal Lutheran ^		–		10	–	1	–	0
No. 8 Bowie State		–		9	–	1	–	0
No. 7 Westminster (PA)		–		6	–	1	–	1
No. 14 Missouri Western		–		8	–	3	–	1
Azusa Pacific		–		7	–	3	–	0
No. 18 Georgetown (KY)		–		7	–	3	–	0
Missouri Southern		–		7	–	3	–	1
Franklin (IN)		–		6	–	4	–	0
Simon Fraser		–		5	–	4	–	0
Benedictine (KS)		–		5	–	5	–	0
Waynesburg		–		4	–	4	–	1
Austin		–		3	–	5	–	1
Eureka		–		3	–	5	–	1
Iowa Wesleyan		–		2	–	7	–	0
Oklahoma Panhandle State		–		2	–	9	–	0
Geneva		–		0	–	9	–	0
^ – NAIA Division II playoff participant San Diego forfeited a win over Azusa Pacific.; Rankings from NAIA Division II poll

1976 NAIA Division II independents football records
	Conf.			Overall
Team	W	L	T	W		L		T
No. 3 Texas Lutheran ^		–		10	–	1	–	0
No. 1 Westminster (PA) ^		–		10	–	1	–	0
No. 4 Cal Lutheran		–		9	–	1	–	0
No. 11 Georgetown (KY)		–		7	–	2	–	1
Franklin (IN)		–		6	–	3	–	0
No. 18 Waynesburg		–		6	–	3	–	0
No. T–19 Benedictine (KS)		–		7	–	4	–	0
Simon Fraser		–		5	–	5	–	0
Azusa Pacific		–		4	–	5	–	0
Iowa Wesleyan		–		2	–	7	–	0
Oklahoma Panhandle State		–		2	–	8	–	0
Geneva		–		1	–	8	–	0
^ – NAIA Division II playoff participant; Rankings from NAIA Division II poll

1977 NAIA Division II independents football records
	Conf.			Overall
Team	W	L	T	W		L		T
No. 1 Westminster (PA) ^		–		11	–	0	–	0
No. 17 Illinois College		–		7	–	1	–	0
No. 2 Cal Lutheran ^		–		9	–	2	–	0
No. 10 Chadron State		–		8	–	2	–	0
No. 16 Franklin (IN)		–		8	–	2	–	0
No. 11 Waynesburg		–		7	–	2	–	0
Benedictine (KS)		–		7	–	4	–	0
Georgetown (KY)		–		6	–	4	–	0
Peru State		–		5	–	5	–	0
Azusa Pacific		–		4	–	5	–	0
Texas Lutheran		–		4	–	6	–	0
Simon Fraser		–		3	–	5	–	1
Iowa Wesleyan		–		2	–	7	–	0
Geneva		–		1	–	8	–	0
Oklahoma Panhandle State		–		1	–	8	–	0
^ – NAIA Division II playoff participant; Rankings from NAIA Division II poll

1978 NAIA Division II independents football records
	Conf.			Overall
Team	W	L	T	W		L		T
No. 9 Cal Lutheran		–		8	–	2	–	0
Waynesburg		–		6	–	2	–	0
No. 16 Chadron State		–		7	–	2	–	2
No. 14 Westminster (PA)		–		6	–	2	–	1
No. 17 Illinois College		–		6	–	2	–	1
Peru State		–		5	–	3	–	2
Simon Fraser		–		4	–	5	–	0
Azusa Pacific		–		3	–	6	–	0
Benedictine (KS)		–		3	–	6	–	0
Texas Lutheran		–		3	–	6	–	0
Geneva		–		3	–	7	–	0
Oklahoma Panhandle State		–		2	–	7	–	0
Iowa Wesleyan		–		0	–	9	–	0
Rankings from NAIA Division II poll

1979 NAIA Division II independents football records
	Conf.			Overall
Team	W	L	T	W		L		T
No. 7 Cal Lutheran ^		–		7	–	2	–	1
Waynesburg		–		6	–	3	–	0
No. 18 Peru State		–		6	–	4	–	0
Westminster (PA)		–		4	–	5	–	0
Chadron State		–		4	–	5	–	1
Azusa Pacific		–		3	–	4	–	1
Oklahoma Panhandle State		–		4	–	6	–	0
Texas Lutheran		–		4	–	6	–	0
Geneva		–		3	–	6	–	0
Simon Fraser		–		3	–	6	–	0
Benedictine (KS)		–		2	–	8	–	0
Iowa Wesleyan		–		2	–	8	–	0
^ – NAIA Division II playoff participant; Rankings from NAIA Division II poll

1980 NAIA Division II independents football records
	Conf.			Overall
Team	W	L	T	W		L		T
No. 10 Peru State		–		9	–	1	–	0
No. 20 Azusa Pacific		–		8	–	2	–	0
No. 14 Cal Lutheran		–		7	–	2	–	1
No. 19 Oklahoma Panhandle State		–		7	–	3	–	0
Waynesburg		–		5	–	3	–	0
Westminster (PA)		–		5	–	3	–	0
Simon Fraser		–		5	–	4	–	0
Chadron State		–		5	–	5	–	0
Loras		–		5	–	5	–	0
Geneva		–		4	–	5	–	0
Iowa Wesleyan		–		4	–	6	–	0
Texas Lutheran		–		4	–	6	–	0
Benedictine (KS)		–		3	–	7	–	0
Rankings from NAIA Division II poll

1981 NAIA Division II independents football records
	Conf.			Overall
Team	W	L	T	W		L		T
No. 4 Westminster (PA) ^		–		10	–	1	–	0
No. 7 Oklahoma Panhandle State ^		–		9	–	1	–	0
No. 11 Cal Lutheran		–		8	–	2	–	0
No. 20 Peru State		–		7	–	2	–	0
Northwestern (IA)		–		6	–	2	–	1
Azusa Pacific		–		7	–	3	–	0
Loras		–		6	–	3	–	1
Geneva		–		5	–	3	–	1
Waynesburg		–		5	–	3	–	1
Westmar		–		5	–	4	–	0
Chadron State		–		5	–	5	–	0
Benedictine (KS)		–		4	–	6	–	0
Texas Lutheran		–		4	–	6	–	0
Simon Fraser		–		3	–	7	–	0
Iowa Wesleyan		–		2	–	7	–	0
^ – NAIA Division II playoff participant; Rankings from NAIA Division II poll

1982 NAIA Division II independents football records
	Conf.			Overall
Team	W	L	T	W		L		T
No. 1 Northwestern (IA) ^		–		12	–	1	–	0
No. 5 Cal Lutheran ^		–		9	–	2	–	0
No. 7 Westminster (PA) ^		–		9	–	2	–	0
No. 18 Chadron State		–		6	–	2	–	0
Loras		–		7	–	3	–	0
Azusa Pacific		–		5	–	3	–	0
Benedictine (KS)		–		6	–	4	–	0
No. 16 Oklahoma Panhandle State		–		7	–	5	–	0
Waynesburg		–		4	–	4	–	1
Geneva		–		4	–	5	–	0
Texas Lutheran		–		4	–	5	–	0
Iowa Wesleyan		–		2	–	8	–	0
Simon Fraser		–		2	–	8	–	0
Peru State		–		1	–	8	–	0
Westmar		–		0	–	9	–	1
^ – NAIA Division II playoff participant; Rankings from NAIA Division II poll

1983 NAIA Division II independents football records
	Conf.			Overall
Team	W	L	T	W		L		T
No. 1 Northwestern (IA) ^		–		14	–	0	–	0
No. 5 Westminster (PA) ^		–		9	–	2	–	0
No. 12 Loras		–		8	–	2	–	1
No. 16 Iowa Wesleyan		–		7	–	2	–	1
Texas Lutheran		–		7	–	3	–	0
Azusa Pacific		–		6	–	3	–	0
Waynesburg		–		6	–	3	–	1
Benedictine (KS)		–		6	–	4	–	0
Geneva		–		5	–	4	–	0
Peru State		–		4	–	5	–	0
Cal Lutheran		–		4	–	6	–	0
Chadron State		–		4	–	6	–	0
Oklahoma Panhandle State		–		3	–	7	–	0
Westmar		–		2	–	7	–	1
Evangel		–		2	–	8	–	0
^ – NAIA Division II playoff participant; Rankings from NAIA Division II poll

1984 NAIA Division II independents football records
	Conf.			Overall
Team	W	L	T	W		L		T
No. 2 Northwestern (IA) ^		–		11	–	2	–	0
No. 16 Oklahoma Panhandle State		–		9	–	2	–	0
No. 6 St. Ambrose ^		–		9	–	2	–	0
No. 15 Iowa Wesleyan		–		8	–	3	–	0
Azusa Pacific		–		7	–	3	–	0
No. 20 Westminster (PA)		–		5	–	2	–	1
Texas Lutheran		–		5	–	3	–	1
Benedictine (KS)		–		6	–	4	–	0
Peru State		–		6	–	4	–	0
Evangel		–		5	–	4	–	0
Cal Lutheran		–		5	–	4	–	1
Loras		–		5	–	5	–	0
Geneva		–		3	–	6	–	0
Westmar		–		3	–	7	–	1
Chadron State		–		2	–	7	–	1
Waynesburg		–		2	–	8	–	0
Union (KY)		–		1	–	6	–	0
^ – NAIA Division II playoff participant San Francisco State forfeited a win over Azusa Pacific.; Rankings from NAIA Division II poll

1985 NAIA Division II independents football records
	Conf.			Overall
Team	W	L	T	W		L		T
No. 2 Benedictine (KS) ^		–		10	–	1	–	0
No. 4 Northwestern (IA) ^		–		9	–	1	–	1
No. 9 Azusa Pacific		–		7	–	1	–	1
No. 20 Loras		–		8	–	2	–	1
No. 6 St. Ambrose ^		–		8	–	2	–	1
Texas Lutheran		–		6	–	3	–	0
Chadron State		–		5	–	3	–	1
Geneva		–		5	–	4	–	0
Westminster (PA)		–		5	–	4	–	0
Oklahoma Panhandle State		–		5	–	4	–	1
Evangel		–		4	–	6	–	0
Waynesburg		–		4	–	6	–	0
Peru State		–		3	–	7	–	0
Iowa Wesleyan		–		2	–	7	–	0
Westmar		–		2	–	8	–	0
Cumberland (KY)		–		1	–	9	–	0
^ – NAIA Division II playoff participant; Rankings from NAIA Division II poll

1986 NAIA Division II independents football records
	Conf.			Overall
Team	W	L	T	W		L		T
No. 9 Hanover		–		8	–	1	–	0
No. 16 Northwestern (IA)		–		8	–	2	–	0
No. 19 Oklahoma Panhandle State		–		7	–	2	–	0
No. 11 Benedictine (KS)		–		7	–	3	–	0
No. 18 Union (KY)		–		7	–	3	–	0
Bluffton		–		6	–	3	–	0
No. 17 Westminster (PA)		–		6	–	3	–	0
No. 20 Wilmington (OH)		–		6	–	3	–	0
Westmar		–		6	–	3	–	1
Evangel		–		6	–	4	–	0
St. Ambrose		–		6	–	4	–	0
St. Francis (IL)		–		6	–	4	–	0
Findlay		–		5	–	4	–	0
Geneva		–		4	–	6	–	0
Waynesburg		–		4	–	6	–	0
Chadron State		–		3	–	6	–	0
Cumberland (KY)		–		3	–	7	–	0
Iowa Wesleyan		–		3	–	7	–	0
Peru State		–		3	–	7	–	0
Tiffin		–		2	–	8	–	0
Azusa Pacific		–		0	–	7	–	2
Texas Lutheran		–		1	–	9	–	0
Azusa Pacific forfeited 5 wins; Rankings from NAIA Division II poll

1987 NAIA Division II independents football records
	Conf.			Overall
Team	W	L	T	W		L		T
No. 3 St. Ambrose ^		–		11	–	0	–	1
No. 15 Geneva ^		–		11	–	2	–	0
No. 12 Westmar ^		–		9	–	2	–	0
No. 7 Westminster (PA) ^		–		9	–	2	–	0
No. 10 Bluffton ^		–		8	–	2	–	0
No. 13 St. Francis (IL) ^		–		8	–	3	–	0
Findlay		–		5	–	4	–	0
Waynesburg		–		5	–	4	–	0
Wilmington (OH)		–		5	–	4	–	0
Evangel		–		5	–	4	–	1
Peru State		–		5	–	5	–	0
Benedictine (KS)		–		4	–	7	–	0
Iowa Wesleyan		–		4	–	7	–	0
Northwestern (IA)		–		3	–	7	–	0
Oklahoma Panhandle State		–		2	–	7	–	0
Franklin (IN)		–		2	–	8	–	0
Azusa Pacific		–		2	–	8	–	0
Texas Lutheran		–		2	–	8	–	0
Chadron State		–		1	–	8	–	0
Tiffin		–		1	–	9	–	0
^ – NAIA Division II playoff participant; Rankings from NAIA Division II poll

1988 NAIA Division II independents football records
	Conf.			Overall
Team	W	L	T	W		L		T
No. 1 Westminster (PA) ^		–		14	–	0	–	0
No. 19 Azusa Pacific		–		7	–	1	–	0
No. 13 Bluffton ^		–		9	–	2	–	0
Geneva		–		8	–	2	–	0
No. 23 Wilmington (OH)		–		7	–	2	–	1
Franklin (IN)		–		7	–	3	–	0
St. Francis (IL)		–		6	–	4	–	0
Chadron State		–		5	–	5	–	0
Findlay		–		3	–	6	–	0
St. Ambrose		–		2	–	6	–	1
Tiffin		–		2	–	8	–	0
Waynesburg		–		2	–	8	–	0
Oklahoma Panhandle State		–		1	–	7	–	0
Iowa Wesleyan		–		0	–	10	–	0
^ – NAIA Division II playoff participant; Rankings from NAIA Division II poll

1989 NAIA Division II independents football records
	Conf.			Overall
Team	W	L	T	W		L		T
No. 1 Westminster (PA) ^		–		13	–	0	–	0
No. 10 Chadron State ^		–		8	–	2	–	0
No. 13 St. Francis (IL)		–		8	–	2	–	0
Findlay		–		7	–	3	–	0
Bluffton		–		6	–	3	–	0
Geneva		–		6	–	3	–	0
Wilmington (OH)		–		5	–	5	–	0
Azusa Pacific		–		4	–	5	–	0
Waynesburg		–		4	–	7	–	0
St. Ambrose		–		3	–	6	–	0
Tiffin		–		2	–	8	–	0
Oklahoma Panhandle State		–		0	–	10	–	0
^ – NAIA Division II playoff participant; Rankings from NAIA Division II poll

1990 NAIA Division II independents football records
	Conf.			Overall
Team	W	L	T	W		L		T
No. 3 Westminster (PA) ^		–		11	–	2	–	0
No. 7 Chadron State ^		–		9	–	2	–	0
No. 19 Findlay		–		7	–	2	–	1
Azusa Pacific		–		6	–	3	–	0
Lindenwood		–		6	–	4	–	0
Trinity (IL)		–		6	–	4	–	0
No. 25 St. Francis (IL)		–		5	–	4	–	0
Geneva		–		5	–	5	–	0
St. Ambrose		–		3	–	7	–	1
Tiffin		–		1	–	8	–	1
Mount St. Joseph		–		1	–	9	–	0
Oklahoma Panhandle State		–		1	–	9	–	0
^ – NAIA Division II playoff participant; Rankings from NAIA Division II poll

1991 NAIA Division II independents football records
	Conf.			Overall
Team	W	L	T	W		L		T
No. 11 Findlay ^		–		9	–	3	–	0
No. 17 Benedictine (KS)		–		8	–	3	–	0
No. 5 Westminster (PA) ^		–		7	–	3	–	0
No. 7 Peru State ^		–		7	–	4	–	0
St. Francis (IL)		–		6	–	5	–	0
Lindenwood		–		5	–	4	–	1
Northwestern (IA)		–		4	–	5	–	0
Cumberland (TN)		–		4	–	6	–	0
Mount St. Joseph		–		4	–	6	–	0
Tiffin		–		4	–	6	–	0
St. Ambrose		–		4	–	7	–	0
Geneva		–		3	–	6	–	1
Trinity (IL)		–		3	–	6	–	0
Westmar		–		3	–	6	–	0
Clinch Valley		–		2	–	6	–	0
Azusa Pacific		–		1	–	8	–	0
Oklahoma Panhandle State		–		1	–	10	–	0
^ – NAIA Division II playoff participant; Rankings from NAIA Division II poll

1992 NAIA Division II independents football records
	Conf.			Overall
Team	W	L	T	W		L		T
No. 4 Findlay ^		–		12	–	1	–	0
No. 1 Westminster (PA) ^		–		10	–	1	–	0
No. 18 Peru State		–		7	–	2	–	1
Azusa Pacific		–		4	–	5	–	0
Geneva		–		4	–	5	–	0
Mount St. Joseph		–		4	–	5	–	0
St. Ambrose		–		4	–	6	–	0
Tiffin		–		4	–	6	–	0
Clinch Valley		–		3	–	7	–	0
Trinity (IL)		–		2	–	7	–	1
Cumberland (TN)		–		2	–	8	–	0
Oklahoma Panhandle State		–		2	–	8	–	0
Westmar		–		1	–	8	–	0
Lindenwood		–		1	–	9	–	0
^ – NAIA Division II playoff participant; Rankings from NAIA Division II poll

1993 NAIA Division II independents football records
	Conf.			Overall
Team	W	L	T	W		L		T
No. 14 Cumberland (TN) ^		–		9	–	2	–	0
No. 21 Trinity (IL)		–		8	–	2	–	0
No. 7 Tiffin ^		–		8	–	2	–	1
No. 4 Westminster (PA) ^		–		10	–	3	–	0
No. 6 Findlay ^		–		8	–	3	–	0
Clinch Valley		–		6	–	4	–	0
St. Ambrose		–		6	–	5	–	0
Geneva		–		4	–	5	–	0
Azusa Pacific		–		3	–	6	–	0
Peru State		–		3	–	7	–	0
Lindenwood		–		2	–	8	–	1
Oklahoma Panhandle State		–		1	–	8	–	1
^ – NAIA Division II playoff participant; Rankings from NAIA Division II poll

1994 NAIA Division II independents football records
	Conf.			Overall
Team	W	L	T	W		L		T
Clinch Valley		–		6	–	4	–	0
Oklahoma Panhandle State		–		6	–	4	–	1
Azusa Pacific		–		3	–	6	–	0
Peru State		–		3	–	7	–	0
St. Ambrose		–		3	–	7	–	0
Sue Bennett		–		0	–	8	–	0

1995 NAIA Division II independents football records
	Conf.			Overall
Team	W	L	T	W		L		T
No. 12 Clinch Valley ^		–		10	–	2	–	0
Azusa Pacific		–		4	–	4	–	1
Peru State		–		3	–	5	–	1
Sue Bennett		–		0	–	11	–	0
^ – NAIA Division II playoff participant; Rankings from NAIA Division II poll

1996 NAIA Division II independents football records
	Conf.			Overall
Team	W		L	W		L
No. 4 Clinch Valley ^		–		10	–	1
No. 21 Azusa Pacific		–		7	–	3
No. T–24 Peru State		–		7	–	3
McKendree		–		3	–	5
Sue Bennett		–		0	–	11
^ – NAIA Division II playoff participant; Rankings from NAIA Division II poll
