= Joe Fusco =

American football coach (1938–2025)

Biographical details
- Born: February 3, 1938; Wilkinsburg, Pennsylvania, U.S.
- Died: February 22, 2025 (aged 87)

Playing career
- 1957–1959: Westminster (PA)
- Position: Guard

Coaching career (HC unless noted)
- 1960–1966: Wilmington Area HS (PA)
- 1967: Grove City Area HS (PA)
- 1968–1971: Westminster (PA) (assistant)
- 1972–1990: Westminster (PA)

Administrative career (AD unless noted)
- 1985–1999: Westminster (PA)

Head coaching record
- Overall: 154–34–3 (college); 55–14–3 (high school)
- Tournaments: 19–5 (NCAA D-II playoffs)

Accomplishments and honors

Championships
- 4 NAIA Division II (1976–1977, 1988–1989)

Awards
- 2× NAIA Division II Coach of the Year (1988–1989)
- College Football Hall of Fame; Inducted in 2001 (profile)

Joseph B. Fusco (February 3, 1938 – February 22, 2025) was an American college football player, coach, and college athletics administrator. He served as the head coach at Westminster College in New Wilmington, Pennsylvania from 1972 to 1990, compiling a record of 154–34–3. Fusco was inducted into the College Football Hall of Fame as a coach in 2001.

Fusco had a lifetime association with Westminster College. He was guard on the football team from 1957 to 1959, assistant coach from 1968 to 1971, head coach from 1972 to 1990, and athletic director from 1985 to 1999. His other coaching duties were at Wilmington Area High School and Grove City Area Area High School, where he had a 55–14–3 record from 1960 to 1967. In 19 years at Westminster, his teams were ranked in the NAIA top 20 15 times, made in the NAIA Division II playoffs nine times, had a 27-game winning streak, and won four NAIA Division II Football National Championships, in 1976, 1977, 1988, and 1989. His record as head coach at Westminster was 154–34–3, a winning percentage of .814. His 1977 team won the Lambert Cup as the best small-college team in the East.

Fusco graduated from Westminster in 1960, added a master's degree in education in 1965 and a doctorate in education from the University of Pittsburgh in 1980. In addition to the College Football Hall of Fame, Fusco is in the Italian American Sports Hall of Fame, Western Pennsylvania Hall of Fame, Lawrence County Hall of Fame, and NAIA Hall of Fame.

Fusco died on February 22, 2025, at the age of 87.

== Head coaching record ==
=== College ===
Year	Team	Overall	Conference	Standing	Bowl/playoffs	NAIA^{#}
Westminster Titans (NAIA Division II independent) (1972–1990)
1972	Westminster	7–1				7
1973	Westminster	7–1				6
1974	Westminster	7–2				12
1975	Westminster	6–1–1				7
1976	Westminster	10–1			W NAIA Division II Championship	1
1977	Westminster	11–0			W NAIA Division II Championship	1
1978	Westminster	6–2–1				14
1979	Westminster	4–5				
1980	Westminster	5–3				
1981	Westminster	10–1			L NAIA Division II Semifinal	4
1982	Westminster	9–2			L NAIA Division II Semifinal	7
1983	Westminster	9–2			L NAIA Division II Semifinal	5
1984	Westminster	5–2–1				20
1985	Westminster	5–4				
1986	Westminster	6–3				17
1987	Westminster	9–2			L NAIA Division II Quarterfinal	7
1988	Westminster	14–0			W NAIA Division II Championship	1
1989	Westminster	13–0			W NAIA Division II Championship	1
1990	Westminster	11–2			L NAIA Division II Championship	3
Westminster:		154–34–3				
Total:		154–34–3				
National championship Conference title Conference division title or championship game berth
^{#}Rankings from NAIA Division II poll.
