= 1977 Westminster Titans football team =

American college football season

1977 Westminster Titans football

NAIA Division II national champion

NAIA Division II Championship Game, W 17–9 vs. Cal Lutheran
- Conference: Independent
- Record: 11–0
- Head coach: Joe Fusco (6th season)
- Defensive coordinator: Gene Nicholson (6th season)
- Captains: Paul O'Neill; Paul Rice; Scott McLuckey
- Home stadium: Memorial Field

1977 NAIA Division II independents football records
	Conf.			Overall
Team	W	L	T	W		L		T
No. 1 Westminster (PA) ^		–		11	–	0	–	0
No. 17 Illinois College		–		7	–	1	–	0
No. 2 Cal Lutheran ^		–		9	–	2	–	0
No. 10 Chadron State		–		8	–	2	–	0
No. 16 Franklin (IN)		–		8	–	2	–	0
No. 11 Waynesburg		–		7	–	2	–	0
Benedictine (KS)		–		7	–	4	–	0
Georgetown (KY)		–		6	–	4	–	0
Peru State		–		5	–	5	–	0
Azusa Pacific		–		4	–	5	–	0
Texas Lutheran		–		4	–	6	–	0
Simon Fraser		–		3	–	5	–	1
Iowa Wesleyan		–		2	–	7	–	0
Geneva		–		1	–	8	–	0
Oklahoma Panhandle State		–		1	–	8	–	0
^ – NAIA Division II playoff participant; Rankings from NAIA Division II poll

The 1977 Westminster Titans football team was an American football team that represented Westminster College of Pennsylvania as an independent during the 1977 NAIA Division II football season. In their sixth season under head coach Joe Fusco, the Titans compiled an 11–0 record. They advanced to the NAIA Division II playoffs, defeating Concord (WV) (14–13) in the semifinal and Cal Lutheran (17–9) in the NAIA Division II National Championship Game. With its victory in the championship game, the Titans extended their winning streak to 20 games, the longest streak in the nation.

The Titans returned 31 lettermen from the 1976 national championship team. Paul O'Neil, Paul Rice, and Scott McLuckey were the team co-captains.

Offensive tackle Paul O'Neil was selected as a second-team player on the 1977 College Division All-America college football team. Eight Westminster players were selected as first-team players on the Pittsburgh Press' Small College All-District football team: O'Neil; quarterback Steve Kraus; split end Dave Hasson; offensive tackle Paul O'Neil, offensive guard Mark Humphrey; defensive end Dale Hoffman; defensive tackle Mark Claire; linebacker Frank Emanuele; and cornerback Steve Nelson.

== Schedule ==
Date	Opponent	Site	Result	Attendance	Source
September 10	Millersville	Memorial Field; New Wilmington, PA	W 28–7		
September 17	at Juniata	Huntingdon, PA	W 30–0		
September 24	Indiana (PA)	Memorial Field; New Wilmington, PA	W 21–6		
October 1	Waynesburg	Memorial Field; New Wilmington, PA	W 17–15		
October 8	at Grove City	Grove City, PA	W 28–0		
October 15	Frostburg State	Memorial Field; New Wilmington, PA	W 38–0		
October 22	Bethany (WV)	Memorial Field; New Wilmington, PA	W 45–7		
October 29	at Geneva	Beaver Falls, PA	W 30–0		
November 5	Allegheny	Memorial Field; New Wilmington, PA	W 20–6		
November 26	Concord (WV)	Memorial Field; New Wilmington, PA (NAIA Division II semifinal)	W 14–13		
December 3	at Cal Lutheran	Thousand Oaks, CA (NAIA Division II Championship Game)	W 17–9		

== NAIA playoffs ==
=== Semifinal vs. Concord ===
On November 26, Westminster defeated Concord (West Virginia) in the NAIA Division II semifinals by a 14–13 score at New Wilmington, Pennsylvania. Concord scored first when Lawrence Hamilton recovered a blocked punt and ran it back 40 yards for a touchdown in the first quarter. Concord missed the extra point and led, 6–0. In the second quarter, Westminster tied the game at 6–6 when defensive back Steve Nelson intercepted a pass and returned it 43 yards for a touchdown. Westminster also missed its extra point attempt. With 9:40 remaining in the game, Concord retook the lead on a 16-yard touchdown pass from Jeff Broyles to Tony Lipscomb. The extra point was good, and Concord let, 13–6. With 5:05 remaining in the game, Westminster quarterback Steve Kraus threw a 14-yard touchdown pass to tight end John Wilkie. Rather than kick for the one-point conversion, Westminster coach Joe Fusco called for a two-point conversion. Kraus completed a pass to Dave Hassen for the victory.

=== Championship game at Cal Lutheran ===
On December 3, Westminster prevailed against undefeated Cal Lutheran, 17–9, before a crowd of 4,000 in the national championship game at Thousand Oaks, California. Cal Lutheran took a 9–0 lead in the third quarter on a pass from John Kindred to Harry Hedrick. The Titans lost their starting quarterback, Steve Kraus, to a separated shoulder in the third quarter and were also playing without its two top running backs and its top wide receiver. Sophomore halfback Frank Rondinelli led Westminster's comeback.. As he was being hit by a defender, he threw a 59-yard, wobbly touchdown pass to Bill Stiger. Minutes later, Rondinelli ran 37 yards up the middle for the game-winning touchdown. Westminster also intercepted three passes off Cal Lutheran quarterback Kindred.
