= 1989 Westminster Titans football team =

American college football season

1989 Westminster Titans football

NAIA Division II national champion

NAIA Division II Championship Game, W 51–30 vs. Wisconsin–La Crosse
- Conference: Independent
- Record: 13–0
- Head coach: Joe Fusco (18th season)
- Defensive coordinator: Gene Nicholson (18th season)
- Home stadium: Memorial Field

1989 NAIA Division II independents football records
	Conf.			Overall
Team	W	L	T	W		L		T
No. 1 Westminster (PA) ^		–		13	–	0	–	0
No. 10 Chadron State ^		–		8	–	2	–	0
No. 13 St. Francis (IL)		–		8	–	2	–	0
Findlay		–		7	–	3	–	0
Bluffton		–		6	–	3	–	0
Geneva		–		6	–	3	–	0
Wilmington (OH)		–		5	–	5	–	0
Azusa Pacific		–		4	–	5	–	0
Waynesburg		–		4	–	7	–	0
St. Ambrose		–		3	–	6	–	0
Tiffin		–		2	–	8	–	0
Oklahoma Panhandle State		–		0	–	10	–	0
^ – NAIA Division II playoff participant; Rankings from NAIA Division II poll

The 1989 Westminster Titans football team was an American football team that represented Westminster College of Pennsylvania as an independent during the 1989 NAIA Division II football season. In their 18th season under head coach Joe Fusco, the Titans compiled a perfect 13–0 record. They advanced to the NAIA Division II playoffs, defeating Tarleton State (34–0) in the quarterfinal, Central Washington (21–10) in the semifinal and Wisconsin–La Crosse (51–30) in the NAIA Division II National Championship Game.

== Schedule ==
Date	Opponent	Site	Result	Attendance	Source
September 9	at Franklin (IN)	Franklin, IN	W 31–7		
September 16	at Findlay	Findlay, OH	W 35–15		
September 23	Buffalo State	Memorial Field; New Wilmington, PA	W 34–20		
September 30	Adrian	Memorial Field; New Wilmington, PA	W 48–20		
October 7	Geneva	Memorial Field; New Wilmington, PA	W 31–26		
October 21	at Waynesburg	Waynesburg, PA	W 28–0		
October 28	at Tiffin	Tiffin, OH	W 42–0		
November 4	Buffalo State	Memorial Field; New Wilmington, PA	W 35–10		
November 11	at Ashland	Ashland, OH	W 21–13		
November 18	Georgetown (KY)	Memorial Field; New Wilmington, PA (NAIA Division II first round)	W 29–9		
December 2	at Tarleton State	Stephenville, TX (NAIA Division II quarterfinal)	W 34–0	3,650	
December 9	at Central Washington	Ellensburg, WA (NAIA Division II semifinal)	W 21–10		
December 16	vs. Wisconsin–La Crosse	Fawcett Stadium; Canton, OH (NAIA Division II Championship Game)	W 51–30	3,728	

== NAIA playoffs ==
=== First round vs. Georgetown ===
In the opening round of the playoffs, Westminster defeated Georgetown (KY), 29–9, at Memorial Field in New Wilmington. Westminster held Georgetown to six passing yards and 149 rushing yards and forced five fumbles and an interception. Westminster linebacker Mike Ruby recovered three of Georgetown's fumbles. The defense was aided when Georgetown running back Mitch Wilburn, the leading rusher in NAIA Division II with 1,340 yards, was injured in the second quarter and did not return to the game. Westminster running back Brad Tokar rushed for 115 yards and two touchdowns on 19 carries.

=== Quarterfinal at Tarleton State ===
On December 2, Westminster defeated Tarleton State, 34–0, in the NAIA Division II quarterfinals before a crowd of 3,650 at Memorial Stadium in Stephenville, Texas. Coach Joe Fusco credited his team with having "played consistently on offense and defense" and not making mistakes.

=== Semifinal at Central Washington ===
On December 9, Westminster, ranked No. 1, defeated No. 2 Central Washington, 21–10, in the NAIA Division II semifinals at Ellensburg, Washington. Westminster quarterback completed 10 of 24 passes for 172 yards and a touchdown and also scored a rushing touchdown. With the victory, Westminster's winning streak reached 26 games.

=== Championship game vs. Wisconsin–La Crosse ===
On December 16, Westminster defeated Wisconsin–La Crosse, 51–30, in the national championship game before a crowd of 3,728 at Fawcett Stadium in Canton, Ohio. The victory extended Westminster's winning streak to 27 games. Westminster quarterback Joe Micchia completed 18 of 33 passes for 219 yards and four touchdowns. He finished his college career with a school-record 4,619 passing yards. Westminster cornerback Louis Berry scored the final points after intercepting a two-point conversion attempt and returning it 98 yards for two points.
