= 1994 Westminster Titans football team =

American college football season

1994 Westminster Titans football

NAIA Division II national champion MSFA MEL champion

NAIA Division II Championship Game, W 27–7 vs. Pacific Lutheran
- Conference: Mid-States Football Association
- Mideast League
- Record: 12–2 (4–0 MSFA)
- Head coach: Gene Nicholson (4th season)

1994 Mid-States Football Association standings
	Conf.					Overall
Team		W		L			W		L
Mideast League
No. 3 Westminster (PA) x^	4	–	0	–	0	12	–	1	–	0
Malone	2	–	2	–	0	7	–	3	–	0
No. 16 Tiffin ^	2	–	2	–	0	8	–	4	–	0
Geneva	2	–	2	–	0	6	–	3	–	0
Urbana	0	–	4	–	0	3	–	7	–	0
Midwest League
No. 14 Trinity (IL) x^	5	–	0	–	0	7	–	3	–	1
No. 15 Findlay ^	4	–	1	–	0	6	–	4	–	0
Taylor	2	–	3	–	0	3	–	7	–	0
Olivet Nazarene	2	–	3	–	0	2	–	8	–	0
Saint Xavier	2	–	3	–	0	2	–	8	–	0
Lindenwood	0	–	5	–	0	2	–	8	–	0
x – League champion/co-champions ^ – NAIA playoff participant; Rankings from NAIA Division II poll

The 1994 Westminster Titans football team was an American football team that represented Westminster College of Pennsylvania as a member of Mideast League (MEL) within the Mid-States Football Association (MSFA) during the 1994 NAIA Division II football season. In their fourth season under head coach Gene Nicholson, the Titans compiled a 12–2 record. They advanced to the NAIA Division II playoffs, defeating Tiffin (42–14) in the quarterfinal, Lambuth (46–6) in the semifinal and Pacific Lutheran (27–7) in the NAIA Division II National Championship Game.

== Schedule ==
Date	Time	Opponent	Site	Result	Attendance	Source
September 3		Malone	Memorial Field; New Wilmington, PA	W 36–21		
September 10		at Geneva	Beaver Falls, PA	W 38–6		
September 17		Findlay*	Memorial Field; New Wilmington, PA	W 17–14		
September 24		at Clarion*	Clarion, PA	L 28–32		
October 1		at Ferrum*	Adams Stadium; Ferrum, VA	W 37–6		
October 8		Georgetown (KY)*	Memorial Field; New Wilmington, PA	W 28–7		
October 15		Allegheny*	Memorial Field; New Wilmington, PA	L 9–14	3,500	
October 22		Urbana	Memorial Field; New Wilmington, PA	W 35–6		
October 29		at Tiffin	Columbian Stadium; Tiffin, OH	W 25–23		
November 12		Buffalo State*	Memorial Field; New Wilmington, PA	W 35–19		
November 19		Findlay*	Memorial Field; New Wilmington, PA (NAIA Division II first round)	W 41–30	1,500	
December 3		Tiffin*	Memorial Field; New Wilmington, PA (NAIA Division II quarterfinal)	W 42–14		
December 10		Lambuth*	Memorial Field; New Wilmington, PA (NAIA Division II semifinal)	W 46–6	1,300	
December 17	4:00 p.m.	vs. Pacific Lutheran*	Civic Stadium; Portland, OR (NAIA Division II Championship Game)	W 27–7	4,357	
*Non-conference game; All times are in Eastern time

== NAIA playoffs ==
=== First round vs. Findlay ===
On November 19, Westminster defeated the Findlay Oilers, 41–30, in its first-round playoff game. Findlay led, 23–14, at the start of the fourth quarter. The Titans came from behind with four fourth-quarter touchdowns by junior running back Andy Blatt. Blatt rushed for 96 yards on 20 carries and scored five touchdowns in the game. Westminster quarterback Sean O'Shea completed 20 of 32 passes for 254 yards. Westminster out-gained Findlay by 340 yards of total offense to 320.

=== Quarterfinal vs. Tiffin ===
On December 3, Westminster defeated Tiffin, 42–14, in the NAIA Division II quarterfinal game at New Wilmington, Pennsylvania. Quarterback Sean O'Shea completed 22 of 29 passes for 340 yards and five touchdowns. He also broke Joe Micchia's career record by extending his total to 4,695 passing yards. Westminster back Andy Blatt also rushed for 152 yards and a touchdown on 20 carries. The Titans out-gained Tiffin by 582 yards to 354.

=== Semifinal vs. Lambuth ===
On December 10, No. 3 Westminster defeated No. 7 Lambuth (Tennessee), 46–6, in an NAIA Division II semifinal game played before a crowd of 1,300 at Memorial Field in New Wilmington, Pennsylvania. Senior tailback Andy Blatt led the offense with 216 rushing yards and three touchdowns in the first half.

=== National championship game vs. Pacific Lutheran ===
On December 17, Westminster defeated Pacific Lutheran, 27–7, in the NAIA Division II national championship game before a crowd of 4,357 at Civic Stadium in Portland, Oregon. The game was a rematch of the 1993 championship game won by Pacific Lutheran. Andy Blatt led the offense for Westminster, rushing for 128 yards and a touchdown and throwing a 60-yard touchdown pass. Westminster quarterback Sean O'Shea also threw two touchdown passes, and Tim McNeil also caught two touchdown passes. The Titans also intercepted three passes off Pacific Lutheran quarterback Karl Hoseth. It was the sixth national championship for Westminster, following prior championships in 1970, 1976, 1977, 1988, and 1989.
