= Phi Sigma Beta =

Phi Sigma Beta (ΦΣΒ) may refer to:

- Phi Sigma Beta (Puerto Rico), a former country district of Phi Sigma Alpha fraternity
- Tau Delta Phi, a Jewish high school fraternity, formed as Phi Sigma Beta
- Phi Sigma Beta, a professional fraternity for osteopathic medicine, now Phi Sigma Gamma
- Phi Sigma Beta, a dormant general women's sorority
