= Steven Eisenberg =

American physician (born 1970)

Dr. Steven G. Eisenberg
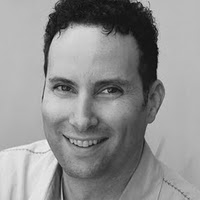
- Born: July 23, 1970 (age 56); Ambler, Pennsylvania, U.S.
- Education: Pennsylvania State University (BA); Philadelphia College of Osteopathic Medicine (DO,)
- Occupation: Oncologist
- Spouse: Julie Shapiro (2000–present)
- Children: Kaiya, Tori & Brandon
- Website: www.drsteven.com

Steven Eisenberg (born June 23, 1970) is a San Diego, California based specialist in internal medicine, hematology, and oncology. He is known as the "Singing Doctor", having written over 100 songs for his patients, tailored to their own situations.

== Education ==
Eisenberg attended Pennsylvania State University. After receiving his B.A. in 1992 he attended Philadelphia College of Osteopathic Medicine (PCOM), where he earned his doctoral degree in Osteopathic Medicine. He continued his postgraduate education by serving a Fellowship in hematology/oncology at Georgetown University Hospital, at the Lombardi Comprehensive Cancer Center.

== Career ==
Much of Eisenberg's work in the early 2000s involved the clinical use of chemotherapy in the adjuvant and metastatic settings. During this period Eisenberg published studies on colorectal cancer, and the use of a new chemotherapy technique for colon cancer patients using irinotecan, 5-fluorouracil, and leucovorin. Since 2005, Eisenberg has focused his practice on compassion and empathy in clinical oncology.

In 2011, Eisenberg founded Chemotopia (now Base Health), a social networking community for cancer patients, their families and caregivers. A year later, Eisenberg was one of 12 healthcare entrepreneurs accepted into the incubator program Startup Health.

== Singing doctor ==
After winning a contest when he was undergoing a period of illness, Eisenberg had a song written for him. Because the song made him feel better, he started writing songs for his patients. In early 2008, Eisenberg started Lyrical Life, an organization which writes songs for patients battling cancer. Later that year, Grammy-nominated singer-songwriter and composer Peter Himmelman wrote a song about Eisenberg's work.

In 2011, his efforts were featured in a report by Jenna Bush Hager on NBC's The Today Show. By 2016, Eisenberg had written more than 100 songs. In 2018 Eisenberg appeared on America's Got Talent but was not selected to advance.

== Personal life ==
Eisenberg married Julie Shapiro in 2000, and has two daughters and a son.
