= Joseph C. Gambone =

American physician

- Education: LaSalle College (B.A.); Philadelphia College of Osteopathic Medicine (D.O.); University of California, Los Angeles (M.B.A., M.P.H.)
- Occupations: Physician, professor, author

Joseph C. Gambone is an osteopathic physician, clinical professor at Western University of Health Sciences, and emeritus professor of obstetrics and gynecology at University of California, Los Angeles (UCLA). Gambone is the Executive Editor of the textbook Essentials of Obstetrics and Gynecology. He currently practices reproductive endocrinology and infertility in Durango, Colorado. A former Lieutenant in the US Navy, Gambone Peak in Antarctica was named in his honor.

== Background and education ==
Joseph C. Gambone graduated from LaSalle College with a Bachelor of Arts in Psychology/Biology in 1966. In the late 1960s, he worked as an officer in the US Navy, at the rank of Lieutenant. For his work in the Navy, Gambone Peak in Antarctica was named in his honor.

He graduated from the Philadelphia College of Osteopathic Medicine in 1974. He completed a 1 year internship at Naval Hospital in San Diego. He completed a residency in obstetrics and gynecology at UCLA Medical Center in 1979. In 1981, he completed a fellowship in reproductive endocrinology and infertility at UCLA Medical Center.

In 1992, he completed a Master of Business Administration at the UCLA Anderson School of Management. In 1999, he completed a Masters in Public Health (MPH) degree at UCLA School of Public Health.

== Publications ==
- Reece, Albert; Gambone, Joseph (Jan 1, 1994). Clinical Obstetrics and Gynecology: Quality Assessment in Women's Health Care. J. B. Lippincott Company.
- Meldrum, David R.; Gambone, Joseph (20 September 2011). Survival of the firmest : UCLA doctors describe ten steps to better erections, a longer life and reversing erectile dysfunction (ED). CreateSpace. ISBN 978-1461150831.
- Meldrum, DR; Gambone, JC; Morris, MA; Meldrum, DA; Esposito, K; Ignarro, LJ (15 August 2011). "The link between erectile and cardiovascular health: the canary in the coal mine". The American Journal of Cardiology. 108 (4): 599–606. doi:10.1016/j.amjcard.2011.03.093. PMID 21624550.
- Gambone, JC; Segars, JH; Cedars, M; Schlaff, WD (July 2015). "Fellowship training and board certification in reproductive endocrinology and infertility". Fertility and Sterility. 104 (1): 3–7. doi:10.1016/j.fertnstert.2015.04.039. PMID 26048151.
- Gambone, JC (February 2003). "How we got to the Women's Health Initiative hormone replacement trial". The Journal of the American Osteopathic Association. 103 (2 Suppl 2): S1-2. PMID 12625630.
