= Grove City Area School District =

School district in Pennsylvania, USA

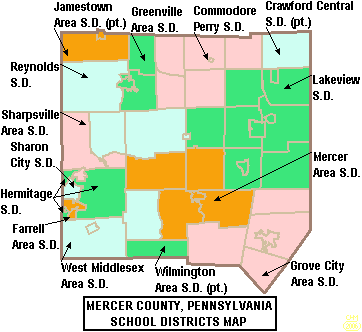

Address
- 511 Highland Avenue Grove City, Mercer County, Pennsylvania, 16127-1107; United States

District information
- Type: Public
- Motto: To Equip all Students for third Successful Futures.
- Grades: K-12

Students and staff
- Colors: Gold and black

Other information
- Website: www.grovecity.k12.pa.us

The Grove City Area School District is a small, rural, public school district serving the south eastern region of Mercer County, Pennsylvania. It encompasses the communities of Grove City, Pine Township, Wolf Creek Township, Springfield Township, and Liberty Township. Grove City Area School District encompasses approximately 92 square miles (240 km^{2}). According to 2000 federal census data, it served a resident population of 16,494. By 2010, the district's population was 17,687 people. In 2009, the District residents' per capita income was $17,309, while median family income was $45,646 a year.

Grove City Area School District operates: Highland Primary Center (Kindergarten and first grade), Hillview Intermediate Center (2nd – 5th grade), a middle school for grades 6th–8th, and a 9th – 12th high school.

== Extracurriculars ==
Grove City Area School District offers a wide variety of clubs, activities and extensive sports program to middle school and high school students.

=== Sports ===
The District funds:

Boys

- Baseball (Varsity/JV) – AAA
- Basketball (Varsity/JV/9th) – AAA
- Cross Country (Varsity/JV) – AA
- Football (Varsity/JV) – AA
- Golf – AAA
- Soccer (Varsity/JV) – AA
- Swimming and Diving – AA
- Tennis – AA
- Track and Field – AAA
- Wrestling (Varsity/JV) – AA

Girls

- Basketball (Varsity/JV/9th) – AAA
- Cross Country (Varsity/JV) – AA
- Soccer (Fall) (Varsity/JV) – AA
- Softball (Varsity/JV)- AAA
- Swimming and Diving – AA
- Girls' Tennis – AA
- Track and Field – AAA
- Volleyball (Varsity/JV) – AA

Middle School Sports

Boys

- Basketball (7th / 8th)
- Cross Country
- Football
- Track and Field
- Wrestling

Girls

- Basketball
- Cross Country
- Track and Field
- Volleyball

According to PIAA directory July 2013
