= W. Kenneth Riland =

American physician

- Born: August 7, 1912; Camden, New Jersey
- Died: March 13, 1989 (aged 76); New York City, U.S.

W. Kenneth Riland, D.O. (1912–1989) was born August 7, 1912, in Camden, New Jersey. An osteopathic physician (DO) whose patients included Richard M. Nixon and Nelson A. Rockefeller, he was the cofounder of the New York College of Osteopathic Medicine, in Old Westbury, Long Island, New York.

According to an obituary in DO Magazine:

Personal physician to Nelson A. Rockefeller for more than 30 years, Dr. Riland treated a number of nationally known figures. He provided osteopathic manipulative treatment (OMT) to Richard M. Nixon for several years and even traveled with the President on his world trip in 1969 and his trip to China in 1972. Dr. Riland also provided OMT to Henry A. Kissinger during his stint as Secretary of State .... Dr. Riland graduated from the Philadelphia College of Osteopathic Medicine in 1936. Soon after settling in Manhattan, he began working part-time for the US Steel Corporation. He later became U.S. Steel's chief physician in New York, a position he held for more than 20 years. In 1974, he became a consultant to the company. He was still practicing in Manhattan at the time of his death.

Riland was a cofounder and chairman of the board of the New York College of Osteopathic Medicine (NYCOM) of New York Institute of Technology (NYIT) in Old Westbury, NY. He was also a founder and the first president of both the New York Academy of Osteopathy and the academy's Foundation for Research. Riland delivered the 1969 Andrew Taylor Still Memorial Address, an annual lecture presented at the American Osteopathic Association's (AOA) House of Delegates in memory and honor of the founder of osteopathic medicine; it is considered as one of the profession's highest honors. Riland was board certified in rehabilitation medicine and was a Fellow of the American Academy of Osteopathy (AAO) and the New York Academy of Osteopathy. He served the AAO as a Trustee and as a member of its Board of Governors, and he was the 1963 recipient of the academy's Andrew Taylor Still Medallion of Honor. He also served as chairman of the Board of Trustees of the Postgraduate Institute of Osteopathic Medicine & Surgery which is now affiliated with NYCOM. Riland received an honorary doctorate of science from Midwestern University's Chicago College of Osteopathic Medicine and a doctor of laws degree from the New York Institute of Technology. He also received a distinguished service award from the New York State Osteopathic Medical Society and O.J. Snyder Memorial Medallion from the Philadelphia College of Osteopathic Medicine.

Riland was known to be a Manhattan socialite. He kept a journal of his life's events, which is now at the Rockefeller Archive Center in Sleepy Hollow, New York

He died of complications from lymphoma at age 76 at New York Hospital on March 13, 1989.

The W. Kenneth Riland Memorial Lecture and medal presentation is a key feature at the annual mid-year conference of the American Osteopathic College of Occupational & Preventive Medicine (AOCOPM). Riland was a pioneer in the field of occupational & environmental medicine, a longtime member and fellow of the AOCOPM. Established in 1983, this prestigious lecture is presented by an individual, member or nonmember, who has demonstrated a desire to see the practice of occupational & preventive medicine excel for the public good.
