= Philadelphia College of Osteopathic Medicine =

American medical school in Philadelphia, Pennsylvania, U.S.

Coordinates: 40.005°N 75.217°W

- Former names: Philadelphia College and Infirmary of Osteopathy
- Motto: "Mens et Manus"
- Motto in English: The Mind and the Hand
- Type: Private medical school
- Established: January 27, 1899; 127 years ago; in New Jersey, U.S.
- Founders: O.J. Snyder, Mason W. Pressley
- Endowment: $612.1 million (2024)
- Chairman: Thomas J. Gravina
- Chancellor: Leonard Finkelstein
- Provost: Kenneth J. Veit
- President, Chief Executive Officer: Jay S. Feldstein, DO
- Academic staff: 183
- Students: 2,855
- Location: Philadelphia, Pennsylvania, United States
- Campus: Urban, 17 acres (Philadelphia) 20 acres (Georgia)
- Other campuses: Suwanee; Moultrie
- Colors: Burgundy and Gray
- Website: Official website

Philadelphia College of Osteopathic Medicine (PCOM) is a private medical school with its main campus in Philadelphia, Pennsylvania, United States, and additional locations in Suwanee, Georgia (PCOM Georgia) and Moultrie, Georgia (PCOM South Georgia).

Founded in 1899, PCOM is one of the nation's oldest medical schools. PCOM also operates several healthcare centers in Philadelphia and an osteopathic care clinic in Suwanee, Georgia. Additionally, PCOM sponsors residency training programs, which train newly graduated physicians. The Center for Chronic Disorders of Aging, which aims to improve quality of life for elderly individuals, is located on the Philadelphia campus.

== History ==
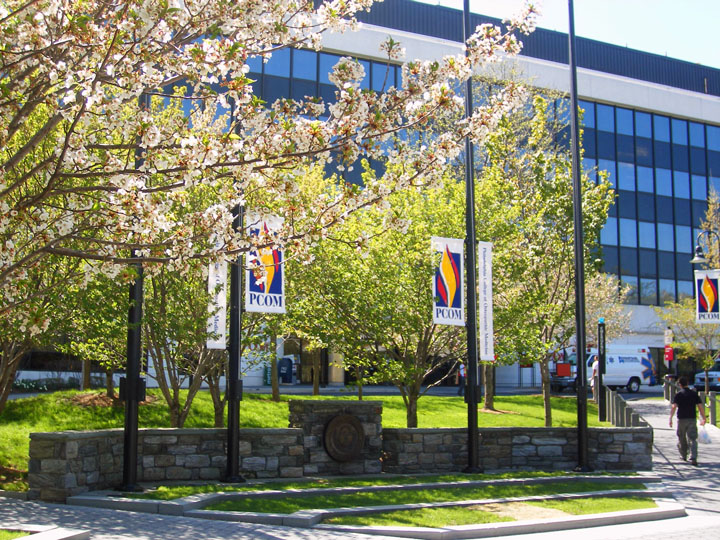

On January 27, 1899, the school was incorporated in New Jersey as the Philadelphia College and Infirmary of Osteopathy (PCIO). In its articles of incorporation, the school said it would develop osteopathy by natural sciences and sell necessary osteopathic appliances and instruments. Its founders were Dr. O.J. Snyder and Dr. Mason W. Pressley, and its initial shareholders were Dr. Pressley, James A. Riley, and George T. Bergen. Dr. Snyder was its first president, and dr. Pressley was its first secretary and treasurer. The school's original location was in the Witherspoon Building in Philadelphia. In Summer 1899, PCIO established a branch office in Atlantic City, New Jersey. By 1900, there were seven male instructors and several assistant instructors, some of whom were women. In 1901, the school made arrangements with the Philadelphia School of Anatomy to use its facilities. After a student passed four terms of five months each over a period of two years, the student graduated and was awarded the degree of Doctor of Osteopathy. Alternatively, a student could enroll in a three-year joint course with Philadelphia School of Anatomy and earn both a Doctor of Osteopathy and a special diploma from the Philadelphia School of Anatomy. Tuition for the two-year course of study cost Tuition cost $350 (equivalent to $13,500 in 2025), while tuition for the three-year course of study cost $500 (equivalent to $19,400 in 2025).

PCIO was the third osteopathic medical school to open in the United States. In September 1899, the first PCIO degree was awarded, and in February 1900, the first PCIO "class", comprising one woman and one MD, graduated. In May 1921, PCIO was renamed to Philadelphia College of Osteopathy (PCO). In 1967, the school adopted its present-day name, becoming the Philadelphia College of Osteopathic Medicine (PCOM).

In 1973, PCOM opened a new building, Evans Hall (renamed the Howard A. Hassman, DO ’83 Academic Center in January 2024), and relocated to its current campus along City Avenue in Philadelphia. In 1979, PCOM acquired the adjacent office building, which was later named Rowland Hall in honor of PCOM's 4th President. From 1995 to 1999, Evans Hall expanded to include a modern osteopathic medicine (OMM) lab, more classrooms, a new cafeteria, and the office of admissions.

During the 1990s, a series of new graduate level programs were added, expanding the scope of the medical school to a wide range of health-care related programs. In 1993, PCOM started the graduate program in biomedical science, offering graduate certificates, and Master of Science degrees. In 1995, a Doctor of Psychology program was established. In 2005, the school opened a branch campus in Georgia, which graduated its first DO class in 2009.

In 2005, PCOM Georgia (formerly known as GA-PCOM) enrolled its first class of osteopathic medical students. PCOM Georgia offers the Doctor of Osteopathic Medicine degree (DO), the Doctor of Pharmacy degree, the Doctor of Physical Therapy degree and graduate programs in biomedical sciences and physician assistant studies.

In 2019, PCOM South Georgia welcomed its inaugural class of osteopathic medicine students, and in 2020, its first cohort of Master of Science in Biomedical Sciences students.

For more than a century, PCOM has trained physicians, health practitioners, and behavioral scientists. In January 2024, PCOM celebrated its 125th anniversary. In the United States, there are two types of physicians: DO physicians and MD physicians. Both are fully qualified physicians, licensed to prescribe medication and perform surgery.

== Academics ==
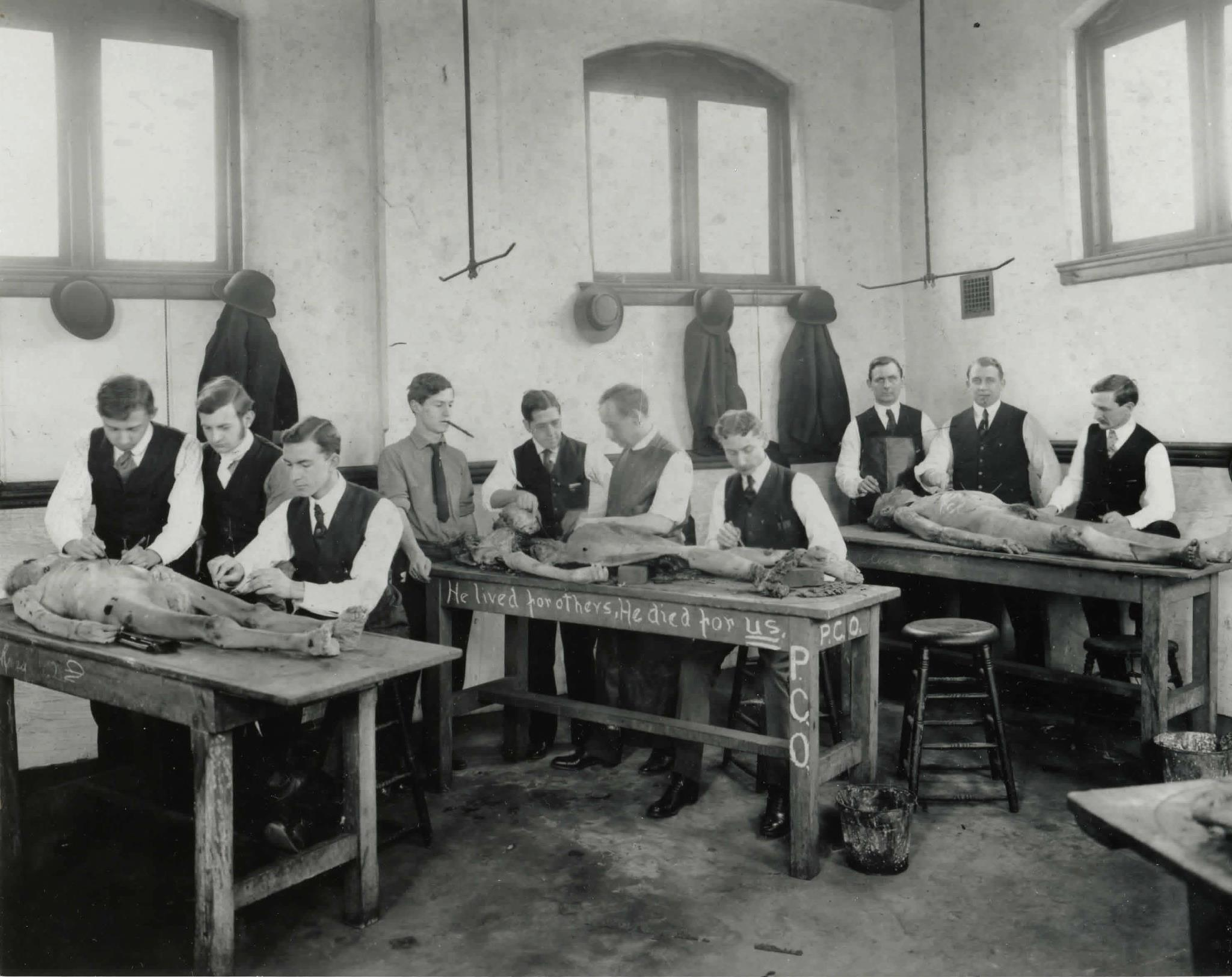
PCOM Archives: 1908 Dissection Lab

As a free-standing medical school, PCOM offers only graduate-level training. PCOM offers doctoral degrees in osteopathic medicine (D.O.), pharmacy (PharmD), physical therapy (DPT), and psychology (PsyD). In addition, master's degrees are offered in school psychology, forensic medicine, biomedical sciences, and physician assistant studies.

PCOM is institutionally accredited by the Middle States Association of Colleges and Schools. The Doctor of Osteopathic Medicine (DO) program is accredited by the American Osteopathic Association. The Doctor of Pharmacy (PharmD) program at PCOM Georgia is accredited by the Accreditation Council for Pharmacy Education (ACPE). The Accreditation Review Commission on Education for the Physician Assistant (ARC-PA) has granted Accreditation-Continued status to the Philadelphia College of Osteopathic Medicine Physician Assistant Program sponsored by Philadelphia College of Osteopathic Medicine. The Doctoral Program in Physical Therapy at PCOM Georgia is accredited by the Commission on Accreditation in Physical Therapy Education (CAPTE). PCOM's PsyD program in Clinical Psychology is accredited by the American Psychological Association and its School Psychology PsyD program is accredited by the American Psychological Association.

== Campuses ==
PCOM operates three campuses; one campus is located in Philadelphia, another is near Atlanta in Suwanee, Georgia and the third is in Moultrie, Georgia. The Philadelphia campus is 17 acres, and the Georgia campus in Suwanee is 23 acres.

The PCOM Library is the college's library. In addition to its other activities, the library is also responsible for the creation of the college's institutional repository, the Digital Commons at PCOM.

== Student life ==
Students at both the Philadelphia and Georgia campuses have access to fitness centers, and participate in several recreational and professional clubs on campus. PCOM hosts the sole remaining chapter Phi Sigma Gamma, an osteopathic fraternity, which was founded in 1917. The college hosts an active chapter of Sigma Sigma Phi, a national Osteopathic Medicine Honors Fraternity that emphasizes community service and scholastic achievement.

== Healthcare centers ==
In addition to its affiliation with several teaching hospitals, PCOM runs several primary care healthcare centers including Cambria Division Healthcare Center, Lancaster Avenue Healthcare Center, and the Hassman Family Medicine Center. The clinics serve the dual purpose of providing community-based health care as well as providing educational experiences for medical students. Services include family medicine, gynecology, dermatology, geriatrics, psychology, and OMM.

== Residency programs ==
PCOM residency programs include a multi-hospital integrated approach. The total position numbers can vary with program directors' plans and implementation time frame.

- General Surgery
- Osteopathic Neuromusculoskeletal Medicine
- Ophthalmology
- Orthopedic Surgery
- Otorhinolaryngology

== Center for Chronic Disorders of Aging ==
The mission of the Center for Chronic Disorders of Aging (CCDA) at Philadelphia College of Osteopathic Medicine is to improve the quality of life for all individuals suffering from age-related chronic diseases and disorders. The CCDA promotes a better understanding of the nature of chronic disease processes by supporting basic and applied investigations, and providing educational opportunities for the community, scientists and health care professionals. The CCDA furthers its mission through an interdisciplinary approach combining scientific research, education, and clinical application into chronic diseases and disorders associated with the aging process.

== Notable alumni ==
As of 2023, Philadelphia College of Osteopathic Medicine had trained 14,251 physicians, with 5,830 non-physician alumni.

- Ethel D. Allen, Republican Party politician
- Bo Bartlett, realist painter
- Ronald R. Blanck, first osteopathic physician ever appointed Surgeon General of the US Army
- Mary K. Izaguirre, current Surgeon General of the United States Army and second osteopathic physician to hold the role.
- Sean Conley, Physician to the President (2018–2021) and Commander in the United States Navy
- Ira W. Drew, Democratic politician in the U.S. House of Representatives
- Steven Eisenberg, known as "The Singing Cancer Doctor"
- Ted Eisenberg, the Guinness World Record holder for most breast augmentation surgeries performed
- Jay S. Feldstein, DO, president and chief executive officer of PCOM (2014 to present).
- Joseph C. Gambone, author of Essentials of Obstetrics and Gynecology. Gambone Peak on Antarctica was named in his honor in 1970.
- Joe Heck, U.S. representative for Nevada's 3rd congressional district (2011–2017) and member of the Republican Party
- Umar Johnson, social media personality who focuses on Pan-Africanism
- Joe Micchia, inductee of the College Football Hall of Fame
- Harold Osborn, gold medalist in track at the 1924 Summer Olympics
- Walter Prozialeck, professor at Midwestern University
- W. Kenneth Riland, physician for President Richard M. Nixon and New York Governor Nelson A. Rockefeller, and cofounder of the New York Institute of Technology College of Osteopathic Medicine
- Charles Sophy, psychiatrist, medical director for the Los Angeles Department of Children and Family Services, and author of several books
- Jennifer Strong, defender on the United States women's national soccer team

== See also ==
- Medical schools in Pennsylvania
