= 1974 NAIA Division II football season =

American college football season

- Regular season: August–November 1974
- Postseason: November–December 1974
- National Championship: Seguin, TX
- Champions: Texas Lutheran

The 1974 NAIA Division II football season was the 19th season of college football sponsored by the NAIA and the fifth season of play of the NAIA's lower division for football.

The season was played from August to November 1974 and culminated in the 1974 NAIA Division II Football National Championship, played on December 14, 1974 on the campus of Texas Lutheran University in Seguin, Texas.

Texas Lutheran defeated Missouri Valley in the championship game, 42–0, to win their first NAIA national title.

== Conference standings ==
1974 College Conference of Illinois and Wisconsin football standings
| | Conf. | | | | | Overall |
| Team | W | | L | | T | W | | L | | T |
|---|---|---|---|---|---|---|---|---|---|---|
| No. 9 Illinois Wesleyan + | 7 | – | 1 | – | 0 | 8 | – | 1 | – | 0 |
| No. 11 Millikin + | 7 | – | 1 | – | 0 | 8 | – | 2 | – | 0 |
| Carroll (WI) | 5 | – | 3 | – | 0 | 6 | – | 3 | – | 0 |
| Augustana (IL) | 4 | – | 3 | – | 1 | 5 | – | 3 | – | 1 |
| Carthage | 4 | – | 3 | – | 1 | 5 | – | 3 | – | 1 |
| Wheaton (IL) | 4 | – | 4 | – | 0 | 4 | – | 5 | – | 0 |
| North Park | 2 | – | 6 | – | 0 | 3 | – | 6 | – | 0 |
| Elmhurst | 1 | – | 7 | – | 0 | 1 | – | 8 | – | 0 |
| North Central (IL) | 1 | – | 7 | – | 0 | 1 | – | 8 | – | 0 |
+ – Conference co-champions; Rankings from NAIA Division II poll

1974 Frontier Conference football standings
| | Conf. | | | | | Overall |
| Team | W | | L | | T | W | | L | | T |
|---|---|---|---|---|---|---|---|---|---|---|
| Carroll (MT) $ | 4 | – | 0 | – | 0 | 6 | – | 2 | – | 0 |
| Montana Tech | 3 | – | 1 | – | 0 | 4 | – | 3 | – | 0 |
| Western Montana | 1 | – | 2 | – | 1 | 3 | – | 4 | – | 1 |
| Rocky Mountain | 1 | – | 2 | – | 1 | 2 | – | 5 | – | 1 |
| Eastern Montana | 0 | – | 4 | – | 0 | 0 | – | 8 | – | 0 |
$ – Conference champion

1974 Gateway Conference football standings
| | Conf. | | | | | Overall |
| Team | W | | L | | T | W | | L | | T |
|---|---|---|---|---|---|---|---|---|---|---|
| Northland + | 2 | – | 1 | – | 0 | ? | – | ? | – | 0 |
| Lakeland + | 2 | – | 1 | – | 0 | 6 | – | 3 | – | 0 |
| Milton | 1 | – | 2 | – | 0 | 5 | – | 4 | – | 0 |
| Northwestern (WI) | 1 | – | 2 | – | 0 | ? | – | ? | – | 0 |
$ – Conference champion

1974 Great Lakes Intercollegiate Athletic Conference football standings
| | Conf. | | | | | Overall |
| Team | W | | L | | T | W | | L | | T |
|---|---|---|---|---|---|---|---|---|---|---|
| Northwood + | 2 | – | 1 | – | 0 | 5 | – | 5 | – | 0 |
| Ferris State + | 2 | – | 1 | – | 0 | 3 | – | 6 | – | 1 |
| No. T–17 Grand Valley State | 1 | – | 2 | – | 0 | 6 | – | 3 | – | 0 |
| Hillsdale | 1 | – | 2 | – | 0 | 6 | – | 3 | – | 1 |
+ – Conference co-champions; Rankings from NAIA Division II poll

1974 Heart of America Athletic Conference football standings
| | Conf. | | | | | Overall |
| Team | W | | L | | T | W | | L | | T |
|---|---|---|---|---|---|---|---|---|---|---|
| No. 2 Missouri Valley $^ | 5 | – | 0 | – | 1 | 10 | – | 1 | – | 1 |
| Central Methodist | 5 | – | 1 | – | 0 | 5 | – | 4 | – | 0 |
| William Jewell | 4 | – | 2 | – | 0 | 6 | – | 4 | – | 0 |
| Graceland | 2 | – | 4 | – | 0 | 2 | – | 7 | – | 0 |
| Ottawa | 2 | – | 4 | – | 0 | 4 | – | 5 | – | 0 |
| Tarkio | 1 | – | 4 | – | 1 | 1 | – | 8 | – | 1 |
| Baker | 1 | – | 5 | – | 0 | 3 | – | 6 | – | 0 |
$ – Conference champion; ^ – NAIA Division II playoff participant; Rankings from NAIA Division II poll

1974 Hoosier–Buckeye Conference football standings
| | Conf. | | | | | Overall |
| Team | W | | L | | T | W | | L | | T |
|---|---|---|---|---|---|---|---|---|---|---|
| No. 4 Hanover $^ | 7 | – | 0 | – | 0 | 9 | – | 1 | – | 0 |
| Bluffton | 4 | – | 2 | – | 1 | 4 | – | 4 | – | 1 |
| Wilmington (OH) | 4 | – | 3 | – | 0 | 5 | – | 3 | – | 0 |
| Defiance | 4 | – | 3 | – | 0 | 5 | – | 5 | – | 0 |
| Taylor | 3 | – | 3 | – | 1 | 4 | – | 4 | – | 1 |
| Anderson (IN) | 3 | – | 4 | – | 0 | 3 | – | 6 | – | 1 |
| Findlay | 3 | – | 4 | – | 0 | 3 | – | 7 | – | 0 |
| Manchester (IN) | 1 | – | 6 | – | 0 | 1 | – | 8 | – | 0 |
| Earlham | 0 | – | 7 | – | 0 | 0 | – | 9 | – | 0 |
$ – Conference champion; ^ – NAIA Division II playoff participant; Rankings from NAIA Division II poll

1974 Iowa Conference football standings
| | Conf. | | | | | Overall |
| Team | W | | L | | T | W | | L | | T |
|---|---|---|---|---|---|---|---|---|---|---|
| Central (IA) $^ | 7 | – | 0 | – | 0 | 11 | – | 0 | – | 0 |
| No. 8 William Penn | 6 | – | 1 | – | 0 | 9 | – | 2 | – | 0 |
| Buena Vista | 4 | – | 3 | – | 0 | 5 | – | 4 | – | 0 |
| Upper Iowa | 4 | – | 3 | – | 0 | 4 | – | 5 | – | 0 |
| Luther | 3 | – | 4 | – | 0 | 3 | – | 6 | – | 0 |
| Simpson (IA) | 2 | – | 5 | – | 0 | 2 | – | 6 | – | 1 |
| Dubuque | 1 | – | 6 | – | 0 | 4 | – | 7 | – | 0 |
| Wartburg | 1 | – | 6 | – | 0 | 2 | – | 8 | – | 0 |
$ – Conference champion; ^ – NCAA Division III playoff participant; Rankings from NAIA Division II poll

1974 Kansas Collegiate Athletic Conference football standings
| | Conf. | | | | | Overall |
| Team | W | | L | | T | W | | L | | T |
|---|---|---|---|---|---|---|---|---|---|---|
| No. 15 Friends $ | 8 | – | 0 | – | 0 | 9 | – | 2 | – | 0 |
| Bethany (KS) | 5 | – | 3 | – | 0 | 6 | – | 4 | – | 0 |
| St. Mary of the Plains | 5 | – | 3 | – | 0 | 6 | – | 4 | – | 0 |
| Bethel (KS) | 5 | – | 3 | – | 0 | 5 | – | 4 | – | 0 |
| Southwestern (KS) | 5 | – | 3 | – | 0 | 5 | – | 4 | – | 0 |
| Tabor | 3 | – | 5 | – | 0 | 3 | – | 6 | – | 0 |
| McPherson | 2 | – | 6 | – | 0 | 2 | – | 7 | – | 0 |
| Kansas Wesleyan | 2 | – | 6 | – | 0 | 2 | – | 8 | – | 0 |
| Sterling | 1 | – | 7 | – | 0 | 1 | – | 8 | – | 0 |
$ – Conference champion; Rankings from NAIA Division II poll

1974 Minnesota Intercollegiate Athletic Conference football standings
| | Conf. | | | | | Overall |
| Team | W | | L | | T | W | | L | | T |
|---|---|---|---|---|---|---|---|---|---|---|
| Concordia–Moorhead + | 5 | – | 2 | – | 0 | 7 | – | 2 | – | 0 |
| No. 20 Saint John's (MN) + | 5 | – | 2 | – | 0 | 7 | – | 2 | – | 0 |
| Minnesota–Duluth | 4 | – | 2 | – | 1 | 7 | – | 2 | – | 1 |
| Hamline | 4 | – | 2 | – | 1 | 4 | – | 5 | – | 1 |
| St. Thomas (MN) | 4 | – | 3 | – | 0 | 5 | – | 4 | – | 0 |
| Gustavus Adolphus | 4 | – | 3 | – | 0 | 4 | – | 6 | – | 0 |
| Augsburg | 3 | – | 4 | – | 0 | 5 | – | 5 | – | 0 |
| St. Olaf | 1 | – | 6 | – | 0 | 3 | – | 6 | – | 0 |
| Macalester | 1 | – | 6 | – | 0 | 2 | – | 8 | – | 0 |
+ – Conference co-champions; Macalester's win over Gustavus Adolphus counted in the conference standings for Macalester, but not for Gustavus Adolphus.; Rankings from NAIA Division I poll

1974 Nebraska Intercollegiate Athletic Conference football standings
| | Conf. | | | | | Overall |
| Team | W | | L | | T | W | | L | | T |
|---|---|---|---|---|---|---|---|---|---|---|
| No. 6 Midland $ | 5 | – | 0 | – | 0 | 11 | – | 0 | – | 0 |
| Doane | 4 | – | 1 | – | 0 | 6 | – | 3 | – | 0 |
| Hastings | 3 | – | 2 | – | 0 | 5 | – | 4 | – | 0 |
| Concordia (NE) | 2 | – | 3 | – | 0 | 5 | – | 4 | – | 1 |
| Nebraska Wesleyan | 1 | – | 4 | – | 0 | 3 | – | 6 | – | 0 |
| Dana | 0 | – | 5 | – | 0 | 0 | – | 7 | – | 1 |
$ – Conference champion; Rankings from NAIA Division II poll

1974 North Dakota College Athletic Conference football standings
| | Conf. | | | | | Overall |
| Team | W | | L | | T | W | | L | | T |
|---|---|---|---|---|---|---|---|---|---|---|
| No. 14 Minot State $ | 5 | – | 0 | – | 0 | 7 | – | 1 | – | 0 |
| Dickinson State | 4 | – | 1 | – | 0 | 7 | – | 2 | – | 0 |
| Valley City State | 3 | – | 2 | – | 0 | 4 | – | 4 | – | 0 |
| Mayville State | 2 | – | 3 | – | 0 | 3 | – | 4 | – | 0 |
| Jamestown | 1 | – | 4 | – | 0 | 5 | – | 4 | – | 0 |
| Wahpeton Science | 0 | – | 5 | – | 0 | 1 | – | 6 | – | 0 |
$ – Conference champion; Rankings from NAIA Division II poll

1974 Northwest Conference football standings
| | Conf. | | | | | Overall |
| Team | W | | L | | T | W | | L | | T |
|---|---|---|---|---|---|---|---|---|---|---|
| No. 3 Linfield $^ | 7 | – | 0 | – | 0 | 9 | – | 1 | – | 0 |
| No. 7 Pacific Lutheran | 6 | – | 1 | – | 0 | 8 | – | 1 | – | 0 |
| Willamette | 5 | – | 2 | – | 0 | 7 | – | 2 | – | 0 |
| Whitworth | 4 | – | 3 | – | 0 | 6 | – | 3 | – | 0 |
| College of Idaho | 3 | – | 4 | – | 0 | 4 | – | 5 | – | 0 |
| Lewis & Clark | 1 | – | 6 | – | 0 | 2 | – | 7 | – | 1 |
| Whitman | 1 | – | 6 | – | 0 | 2 | – | 7 | – | 0 |
| Pacific (OR) | 1 | – | 6 | – | 0 | 1 | – | 7 | – | 0 |
$ – Conference champion; ^ – NAIA Division II playoff participant Lewis & Clark forfeited two unplayed conference games, to Whitworth and Willamette.; Rankings from NAIA Division II poll

1974 South Dakota Intercollegiate Conference football standings
| | Conf. | | | | | Overall |
| Team | W | | L | | T | W | | L | | T |
|---|---|---|---|---|---|---|---|---|---|---|
| No. 16 South Dakota Tech $ | 4 | – | 0 | – | 1 | 6 | – | 2 | – | 1 |
| Black Hills State | 3 | – | 1 | – | 1 | 5 | – | 4 | – | 1 |
| Dakota State | 3 | – | 2 | – | 0 | 6 | – | 4 | – | 0 |
| Dakota Wesleyan | 3 | – | 2 | – | 0 | 6 | – | 3 | – | 0 |
| Huron | 1 | – | 4 | – | 0 | 2 | – | 7 | – | 0 |
| South Dakota–Springfield | 0 | – | 5 | – | 0 | 0 | – | 9 | – | 0 |
$ – Conference champion; Rankings from NAIA Division II poll

1974 Southern California Intercollegiate Athletic Conference football standings
| | Conf. | | | | | Overall |
| Team | W | | L | | T | W | | L | | T |
|---|---|---|---|---|---|---|---|---|---|---|
| No. 13 Redlands $ | 5 | – | 0 | – | 0 | 7 | – | 2 | – | 0 |
| No. T–17 Whittier | 4 | – | 1 | – | 0 | 7 | – | 2 | – | 0 |
| La Verne | 3 | – | 2 | – | 0 | 5 | – | 5 | – | 0 |
| Claremont-Mudd | 1 | – | 4 | – | 0 | 2 | – | 6 | – | 0 |
| Occidental | 1 | – | 4 | – | 0 | 1 | – | 7 | – | 0 |
| Pomona-Pitzer | 1 | – | 4 | – | 0 | 1 | – | 8 | – | 0 |
$ – Conference champion; Rankings from NAIA Division II poll

1974 Tri-State Conference football standings
| | Conf. | | | | | Overall |
| Team | W | | L | | T | W | | L | | T |
|---|---|---|---|---|---|---|---|---|---|---|
| No. 10 Northwestern (IA) $ | 5 | – | 0 | – | 0 | 8 | – | 2 | – | 0 |
| No. 20 Yankton | 4 | – | 1 | – | 0 | 7 | – | 2 | – | 0 |
| Bethel (MN) | 2 | – | 3 | – | 0 | 5 | – | 4 | – | 0 |
| Sioux Falls | 2 | – | 3 | – | 0 | 4 | – | 5 | – | 0 |
| Westmar | 2 | – | 3 | – | 0 | 3 | – | 5 | – | 0 |
| Concordia (MN) | 0 | – | 5 | – | 0 | 2 | – | 7 | – | 0 |
$ – Conference champion; Rankings from NAIA Division II poll

1974 West Virginia Intercollegiate Athletic Conference football standings
| | Conf. | | | | | Overall |
| Team | W | | L | | T | W | | L | | T |
|---|---|---|---|---|---|---|---|---|---|---|
Northern Division
| Fairmont State xy$ | 4 | – | 0 | – | 0 | 7 | – | 4 | – | 0 |
| No. 15 Salem | 3 | – | 1 | – | 0 | 7 | – | 2 | – | 0 |
| West Liberty State | 2 | – | 2 | – | 0 | 5 | – | 4 | – | 0 |
| Shepherd | 1 | – | 2 | – | 0 | 2 | – | 9 | – | 0 |
| West Virginia Wesleyan | 0 | – | 4 | – | 0 | 1 | – | 8 | – | 0 |
Southern Division
| Concord xy | 3 | – | 1 | – | 0 | 6 | – | 5 | – | 0 |
| Bluefield State | 3 | – | 1 | – | 0 | 5 | – | 4 | – | 0 |
| Glenville State | 3 | – | 1 | – | 0 | 5 | – | 4 | – | 0 |
| West Virginia Tech | 1 | – | 3 | – | 0 | 5 | – | 4 | – | 0 |
| West Virginia State | 0 | – | 4 | – | 0 | 1 | – | 8 | – | 0 |
Championship: Fairmont State 30, Concord 6
$ – Conference champion; x – Division champion/co-champions; y – Championship game participant; Conference standings based on power ratings; Rankings from NAIA Division I poll

1974 NAIA Division II independents football records
| | Conf. | | | Overall |
| Team | W | L | T | W | | L | | T |
|---|---|---|---|---|---|---|---|---|
| No. 1 Texas Lutheran ^ | | – | | 11 | – | 0 | – | 0 |
| No. 5 Cal Lutheran | | – | | 9 | – | 1 | – | 0 |
| Georgetown (KY) | | – | | 7 | – | 2 | – | 0 |
| No. 12 Westminster (PA) | | – | | 7 | – | 2 | – | 0 |
| Missouri Southern | | – | | 6 | – | 3 | – | 0 |
| Waynesburg | | – | | 6 | – | 3 | – | 0 |
| Simon Fraser | | – | | 4 | – | 4 | – | 0 |
| Franklin (IN) | | – | | 4 | – | 6 | – | 0 |
| Azusa Pacific | | – | | 3 | – | 6 | – | 0 |
| Eureka | | – | | 3 | – | 6 | – | 0 |
| Missouri Western | | – | | 3 | – | 7 | – | 0 |
| Oklahoma Panhandle State | | – | | 3 | – | 8 | – | 0 |
| Austin | | – | | 2 | – | 6 | – | 1 |
| Benedictine (KS) | | – | | 2 | – | 7 | – | 0 |
| Geneva | | – | | 1 | – | 8 | – | 0 |
| Iowa Wesleyan | | – | | 0 | – | 9 | – | 0 |
^ – NAIA Division II playoff participant; Rankings from NAIA Division II poll

== Postseason ==
Semifinals; Campus sites
Texas Lutheran* | 52
Linfield | 8
Missouri Valley | 37
Hanover* | 29

Championship; December 14, 1974; Seguin, TX
Texas Lutheran* | 42
Missouri Valley | 0

== See also ==
- 1974 NAIA Division I football season
- 1974 NCAA Division I football season
- 1974 NCAA Division II football season
- 1974 NCAA Division III football season
