= 1976 Westminster Titans football team =

American college football season

1976 Westminster Titans football

NAIA Division II national champion

NAIA Division II Championship Game, W 20–13 vs. Redlands
- Conference: Independent
- Record: 10–1
- Head coach: Joe Fusco (5th season)
- Defensive coordinator: Gene Nicholson (5th season)
- Home stadium: Memorial Field

1976 NAIA Division II independents football records
	Conf.			Overall
Team	W	L	T	W		L		T
No. 3 Texas Lutheran ^		–		10	–	1	–	0
No. 1 Westminster (PA) ^		–		10	–	1	–	0
No. 4 Cal Lutheran		–		9	–	1	–	0
No. 11 Georgetown (KY)		–		7	–	2	–	1
Franklin (IN)		–		6	–	3	–	0
No. 18 Waynesburg		–		6	–	3	–	0
No. T–19 Benedictine (KS)		–		7	–	4	–	0
Simon Fraser		–		5	–	5	–	0
Azusa Pacific		–		4	–	5	–	0
Iowa Wesleyan		–		2	–	7	–	0
Oklahoma Panhandle State		–		2	–	8	–	0
Geneva		–		1	–	8	–	0
^ – NAIA Division II playoff participant; Rankings from NAIA Division II poll

The 1976 Westminster Titans football team was an American football team that represented Westminster College of Pennsylvania as an independent during the 1976 NAIA Division II football season. In their fifth season under head coach Joe Fusco, the Titans compiled a 10–1 record. They advanced to the NAIA Division II playoffs, defeating Texas Lutheran (31–0) in the semifinal and Redlands (20–13) in the NAIA Division II National Championship Game.

== Schedule ==
Date	Opponent	Site	Result	Attendance	Source
September 11	at Susquehanna	Selinsgrove, PA	W 20–7		
September 18	Juniata	Memorial Field; New Wilmington, PA	L 7–14		
September 25	at Indiana (PA)	Indiana, PA	W 6–2		
October 2	vs. Waynesburg	Memorial Field; New Castle, PA	W 33–7		
October 9	Grove City^{†}	Memorial Field; New Wilmington, PA	W 27–0		
October 16	at Frostburg State	Frostburg, MD	W 55–7		
October 23	at Bethany (WV)	Bethany, WV	W 10–3		
October 30	Geneva	Memorial Field; New Wilmington, PA	W 28–6		
November 6	at Allegheny	Meadville, PA	W 10–7		
November 20	at Texas Lutheran	Matador Stadium; Seguin, TX	W 31–0	4,500	
December 4	at Redlands	University of Redlands Stadium; Redlands, CA	W 20–13	5,278	
^{†}Homecoming

== Season overview ==
=== Homecoming vs. Grove City ===
On October 9, Westminster defeated Grove City, 27–0, in the Titans' homecoming game. It was Westminster's 25th consecutive homecoming victory. Quarterback Jan Budai ran 74 yards for a touchdown after the running back missed an assignment to take the handoff from Budai.

=== Frostburg State ===
Westminster won its most one-sided game of the season on October 16, defeating Frostburg State by a 55–7 score at Frostburg, Maryland. Westminster's defense gave up only four first downs, forced six fumbles and two interceptions, and held Frostburg to 14 passing yards and minus 16 rushing yards. Frostburg's sole touchdown came on an 88-yard kickoff return. Westminter out-gained Frostburg by 535 yards of total offense to minus two.

=== Allegheny ===
On November 6, Westminster concluded its regular season with a 10–7 victory over Allegheny at Robertson Field in Meadville, Pennsylvania. Sophomore Jeff Ribey returned a punt 88 yards for the game-winning touchdown in the fourth quarter. Rimbey was a backup safety and not the team's regular punt returner until an injury earlier in the season gave him the opportunity to play. The victory qualified the Titans for a berth in the NAIA Division II playoffs.

=== Semifinals at Texas Lutheran ===
Westminster entered the playoffs with the top rushing defense in Division II, allowing only 57.7 points per game.

On November 20, Westminster upset the No. 1-ranked Texas Lutheran Bulldogs, winning by a 31–0 score on the road in Seguin, Texas. Texas Lutheran had won the Division II championship in both 1974 and 1975 and was the favorite to win again in 1976. Quarterback Jan Budai threw an 18-yard touchdown pass to Dave Hasson and ran one yard for another touchdown. Dave Armahizer also scored on an 85-yard interception return in the third quarter. On defense, the Titans held Texas Lutheran to 122 rushing yards and 139 passing yards.

=== Championship game at Redlands ===
On December 4, Westminster, ranked No. 2, played in the Division II national championship game, defeating No. 3 Redlands, 20–13, on the road in Redlands, California. Westminster quarterback Jan Budai threw a 44-yard touchdown pass to Dave Hasson. Redlands kicked two field goals, and the Titans led, 7–6, at halftime. In the third quarter, Westminster capitalized on a Redlands fumble recovered at the six-yard line. Mike Szuba scored on a one-yard run. Redlands tied the game, 13–13, on a 29-yard touchdown pass from Steve Vento to Brian DeRoo. Redlands fumbled a punt, and Westminster recovered the ball at Redlands' 22-yard line. From there, the Titans advanced to the two-yard line, and Budai ran two yards for the game-winning touchdown with 6:56 remaining in the game.
