= Joe Micchia =

American football player (born 1966)

Profile
- Position: Quarterback

Personal information
- Born: December 30, 1966 (age 59); Sharon, Pennsylvania, U.S.
- Listed height: 6 ft 1 in (1.85 m)
- Listed weight: 195 lb (88 kg)

Career information
- High school: Sharon (PA)
- College: Youngstown State (1986); Westminster (1987–1989)

Career history
- Pittsburgh Gladiators (1990)

Awards and highlights
- First-team NAIA All-American (1989); Second-tean NAIA All-American (1988); 2x NAIA Division II national champion (1988, 1989)
- College Football Hall of Fame

Joseph Matthew Micchia Jr. (born December 30, 1966) is an American physician and former gridiron football quarterback.

== Biography ==
Micchia was born in Sharon, Pennsylvania, and attended high school there, playing three sports. He initially attended Youngstown State University in Youngstown, Ohio, but transferred to Westminster College in New Wilmington, Pennsylvania, after his freshman year.

Micchia played college football for the Westminster Titans for the 1987 through 1989 seasons, going 31–0 as a starting quarterback. The Titans won consecutive NAIA Division II Football National Championships, in 1988 and 1989, during which the team had a 27-game winning streak. He was the school's first quarterback to accumulate 4,000 passing yards. Micchia wore uniform number 10 in honor of Fran Tarkenton, his favorite player when he was growing up. Micchia briefly played professionally, appearing in the final regular-season game of the 1990 Pittsburgh Gladiators of the Arena Football League.

Micchia received a Bachelor of Science degree from Westminster. Following his football career, Micchia attended the Philadelphia College of Osteopathic Medicine, where he was a member of Phi Sigma Gamma. He graduated in 1994 and later went into private practice in Wake Forest, North Carolina.

In 2013, Micchia was inducted into the College Football Hall of Fame. He is also an inductee of the Titan Sports Hall of Fame at Westminster College (1995), and the Mercer County Hall of Fame (2016).
