= 1988 Westminster Titans football team =

American college football season

1988 Westminster Titans football

NAIA Division II national champion

NAIA Division II Championship Game, W 17–9 vs. Wisconsin–La Crosse
- Conference: Independent
- Record: 14–0
- Head coach: Joe Fusco (17th season)
- Defensive coordinator: Gene Nicholson (17th season)
- Home stadium: Memorial Field

1988 NAIA Division II independents football records
	Conf.			Overall
Team	W	L	T	W		L		T
No. 1 Westminster (PA) ^		–		14	–	0	–	0
No. 19 Azusa Pacific		–		7	–	1	–	0
No. 13 Bluffton ^		–		9	–	2	–	0
Geneva		–		8	–	2	–	0
No. 23 Wilmington (OH)		–		7	–	2	–	1
Franklin (IN)		–		7	–	3	–	0
St. Francis (IL)		–		6	–	4	–	0
Chadron State		–		5	–	5	–	0
Findlay		–		3	–	6	–	0
St. Ambrose		–		2	–	6	–	1
Tiffin		–		2	–	8	–	0
Waynesburg		–		2	–	8	–	0
Oklahoma Panhandle State		–		1	–	7	–	0
Iowa Wesleyan		–		0	–	10	–	0
^ – NAIA Division II playoff participant; Rankings from NAIA Division II poll

The 1988 Westminster Titans football team was an American football team that represented Westminster College of Pennsylvania as an independent during the 1988 NAIA Division II football season. In their 17th season under head coach Joe Fusco, the Titans compiled a perfect 14–0 record. They advanced to the NAIA Division II playoffs, defeating Bluffton (40–7) in the quarterfinal, Evangel (26–9) in the semifinal and Wisconsin–La Crosse (21–14) in the NAIA Division II National Championship Game.

== Schedule ==
Date	Opponent	Site	Result	Attendance	Source
September 10	Franklin (IN)	Memorial Field; New Wilmington, PA	W 43–14		
September 17	Findlay	Memorial Field; New Wilmington, PA	W 23–17		
September 24	at Buffalo	Buffalo, NY	W 14–12		
October 1	at Adrian	Adrian, MI	W 36–3	1,400	
October 8	at Geneva	Beaver Falls, PA	W 39–0		
October 15	at West Virginia Wesleyan	Buckhannon, WV	W 56–42		
October 22	Waynesburg	Memorial Field; New Wilmington, PA	W 30–0		
October 29	Tiffin	Memorial Field; New Wilmington, PA	W 41–0		
November 5	at Buffalo State	Buffalo, NY	W 21–7		
November 12	Ashland	Memorial Field; New Wilmington, PA	W 14–10	3,162	
November 19	Austin	Memorial Field; New Wilmington, PA (NAIA Division II first round)	W 34–12		
November 26	Bluffton	Memorial Field; New Wilmington, PA (NAIA Division II quarterfinal)	W 40–7		
December 3	at Evangel	Briggs Stadium; Springfield, MO (NAIA Division II semifinal)	W 26–9		
December 10	Wisconsin–La Crosse	Memorial Field; New Wilmington, PA (NAIA Division II Championship Game)	W 21–14		

== NAIA Division II playoffs ==
=== First round vs. Austin ===
Westminster advanced to the NAIA Division II playoffs and faced the Austin Kangaroos in the first round. The Titans won, 34–12. Sophomore running back Brad Tokar tallied 167 rushing yards in the game. Quarterback Joe Micchia completed seven of 19 passes for 111 yards and two touchdowns with no interceptions. The Titans out-gained the Kangaroos by 432 yards of total offense to 226.

=== Quarterfinal vs. Bluffton ===
On November 26, Westminster defeated Bluffton, 40–7, in the quarterfinals of the playoffs. Westminster recovered three Bluffton fumbles (two by Andre Borowicz) in the first quarter and converted each of them into touchdowns, taking a 21–0 lead at the end of the quarter. Brad Tokar rushed for 152 yards on 20 carries.

=== Semifinal at Evangel ===
On December 3, Westminster defeated Evangel, 26–9, in the NAIA Division II semifinal game at Briggs Stadium in Springfield, Missouri. Westminster tight end Jeff Hahn caught two touchdown passes and was named the game's most valuable player. Evangel quarterback Don Decker was intercepted five times.

=== Championship game vs. Wisconsin–La Crosse ===
On December 11, Westminster defeated Wisconsin–La Crosse, 21–14, in the NAIA Division II national championship game at Memorial Field in New Wilmington, Pennsylvania. Westminster quarterback Joe Micchia completed 22 of 44 passes for 302 yards and three touchdown passes to wide receiver David Foley. Micchia had been battling the flu and spent the day before the game in infirmary. Micchia threw his first touchdown pass with 16 seconds remaining in the first half to tie the score at 7–7. With 3:35 remaining in the game, Micchia threw a 20-yard touchdown pass to Foley, tying the score at 14–14. Westminster forced a punt and got the ball back with 2:38 remaining. On fourth down, Micchia threw the game-winning touchdown pass to Foley for 33 yards. After the game, coach Fusco said: "I've never been in a game like that, not in a national championship game, not with an ending like that."
