= 1974 Texas Lutheran Bulldogs football team =

American college football season

1974 Texas Lutheran Bulldogs football

NAIA Division II national champion

NAIA Division II Championship Game, W 42–0 vs. Missouri Valley
- Conference: Independent
- Record: 11–0
- Head coach: Jim Wacker (4th season)
- Home stadium: Matador Stadium

1974 NAIA Division II independents football records
| | Conf. | | | Overall |
| Team | W | L | T | W | | L | | T |
|---|---|---|---|---|---|---|---|---|
| No. 1 Texas Lutheran ^ | | – | | 11 | – | 0 | – | 0 |
| No. 5 Cal Lutheran | | – | | 9 | – | 1 | – | 0 |
| Georgetown (KY) | | – | | 7 | – | 2 | – | 0 |
| No. 12 Westminster (PA) | | – | | 7 | – | 2 | – | 0 |
| Missouri Southern | | – | | 6 | – | 3 | – | 0 |
| Waynesburg | | – | | 6 | – | 3 | – | 0 |
| Simon Fraser | | – | | 4 | – | 4 | – | 0 |
| Franklin (IN) | | – | | 4 | – | 6 | – | 0 |
| Azusa Pacific | | – | | 3 | – | 6 | – | 0 |
| Eureka | | – | | 3 | – | 6 | – | 0 |
| Missouri Western | | – | | 3 | – | 7 | – | 0 |
| Oklahoma Panhandle State | | – | | 3 | – | 8 | – | 0 |
| Austin | | – | | 2 | – | 6 | – | 1 |
| Benedictine (KS) | | – | | 2 | – | 7 | – | 0 |
| Geneva | | – | | 1 | – | 8 | – | 0 |
| Iowa Wesleyan | | – | | 0 | – | 9 | – | 0 |
^ – NAIA Division II playoff participant; Rankings from NAIA Division II poll

The 1974 Texas Lutheran Bulldogs football team was an American football team that represented Texas Lutheran College (later renamed Texas Lutheran University) and won the national championship during the 1974 NAIA Division II football season. In their fourth season under head coach Jim Wacker, the Bulldogs compiled a perfect 11–0 record and outscored opponents by a total of 421 to 44. They participated in the NAIA Division II playoffs, defeating Linfield (52–8) in the semifinals and Missouri Valley (42–0) in the NAIA Division II Championship Game. It was the first of two consecutive national championships for Texas Lutheran.

The team played its home games at Matador Stadium in Seguin, Texas.

== Schedule ==
| Date | Opponent | Site | Result | Attendance | Source |
|---|---|---|---|---|---|
| September 7 | at Tarleton State | Stephenville, TX | W 30–0 | | |
| September 14 | at Southwest Texas State | San Marcos, TX | W 30–7 | | |
| September 21 | Howard Payne | Matador Stadium; Seguin, TX | W 50–14 | | |
| September 28 | at Trinity (TX) | San Antonio, TX | W 37–0 | | |
| October 12 | at Valparaiso | Valparaiso, IN | W 35–6 | | |
| October 19 | Austin | Matador Stadium; Seguin, TX | W 57–0 | | |
| October 26 | McMurry | Matador Stadium; Seguin, TX | W 28–0 | | |
| November 2 | Harding | Matador Stadium; Seguin, TX | W 45–0 | | |
| November 9 | at Bishop | Dallas, TX | W 15–9 | | |
| November 23 | Linfield | Matador Stadium; Seguin, TX (NAIA Division II semifinal) | W 52–8 | | |
| December 7 | Missouri Valley | Matador Stadium; Seguin, TX (NAIA Division II National Championship Game) | W 42–0 | | |
