= Liberty Township, Mercer County, Pennsylvania =

Township in Pennsylvania, US

Coordinates: 41°08′00″N 80°07′35″W

Liberty Township
- Township
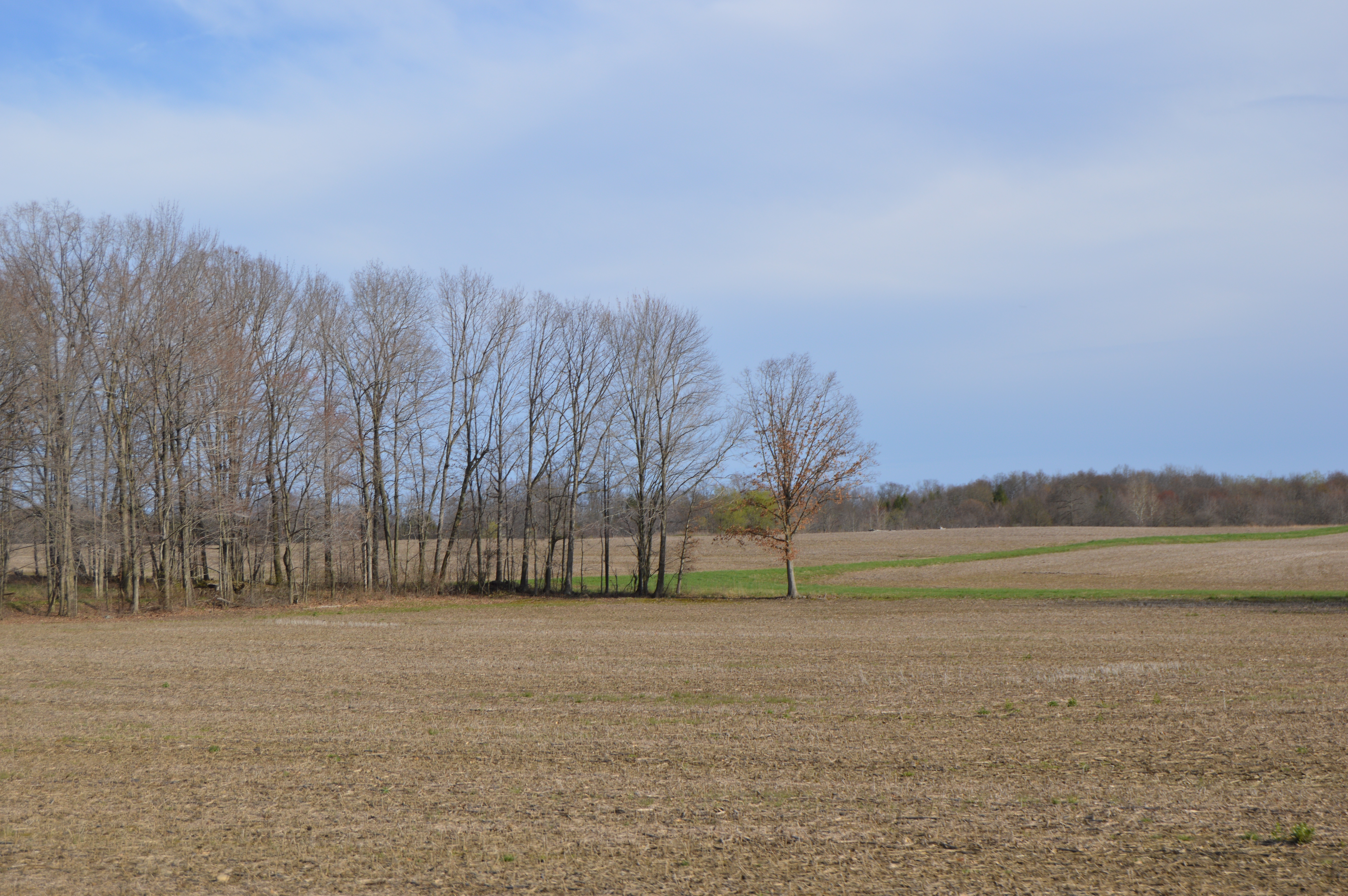
- Open fields south of Grove City

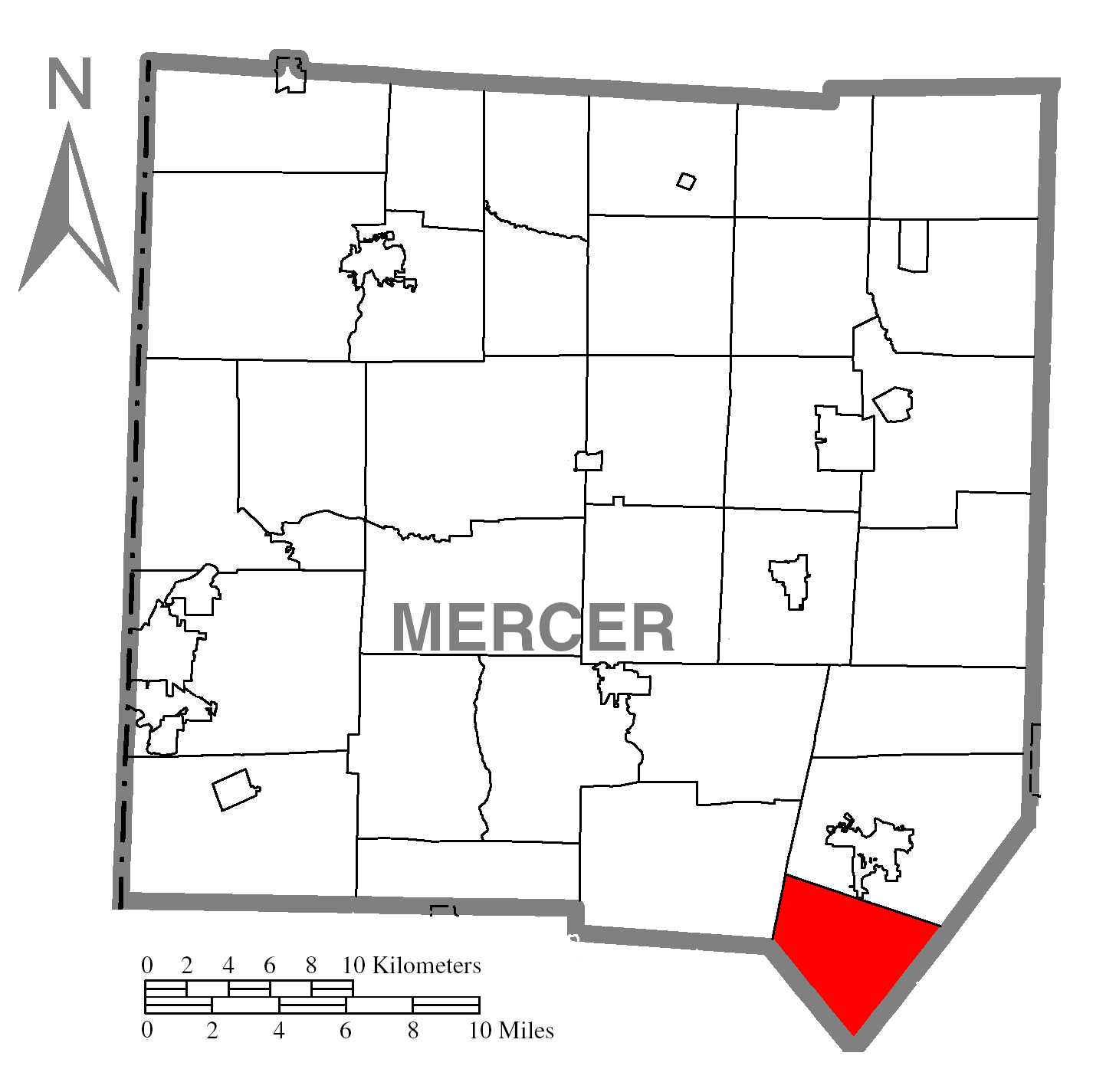
- Location of Liberty Township in Mercer County

- Location of Mercer County in Pennsylvania
- Country: United States
- State: Pennsylvania
- County: Mercer

Area
  - Total: 14.84 sq mi (38.43 km^{2})
  - Land: 14.76 sq mi (38.23 km^{2})
  - Water: 0.077 sq mi (0.20 km^{2})

Population (2020)
  - Total: 1,396
  - Estimate (2023): 1,421
  - Density: 97/sq mi (37.4/km^{2})
- Time zone: UTC-4 (EST)
  - Summer (DST): UTC-5 (EDT)
- Area code: 724
- FIPS code: 42-085-43104

Historical population
| Census | Pop. | Note | %± |
|---|---|---|---|
| 2000 | 1,276 | | — |
| 2010 | 1,414 | | 10.8% |
| 2020 | 1,396 | | −1.3% |
| 2023 (est.) | 1,421 | | 1.8% |
U.S. Decennial Census

Liberty Township is a township in Mercer County, Pennsylvania, United States. The population was 1,397 at the 2020 census, down from 1,414 in 2010.

== Geography ==
According to the United States Census Bureau, the township has a total area of 14.7 square miles (38.0 km^{2}), of which 14.6 square miles (37.7 km^{2}) is land and 0.1 square mile (0.3 km^{2}) (0.82%) is water.

== Demographics ==
As of the census of 2000, there were 1,276 people, 492 households, and 379 families residing in the township. The population density was 87.6 inhabitants per square mile (33.8/km^{2}). There were 514 housing units at an average density of 35.3 per square mile (13.6/km^{2}). The racial makeup of the township was 98.75% White, 0.47% African American, 0.08% Asian, 0.08% from other races, and 0.63% from two or more races. Hispanic or Latino of any race were 0.16% of the population.

There were 492 households, out of which 33.7% had children under the age of 18 living with them, 69.1% were married couples living together, 5.3% had a female householder with no husband present, and 22.8% were non-families. 18.5% of all households were made up of individuals, and 7.7% had someone living alone who was 65 years of age or older. The average household size was 2.58 and the average family size was 2.95.

In the township the population was spread out, with 24.1% under the age of 18, 7.6% from 18 to 24, 28.6% from 25 to 44, 27.0% from 45 to 64, and 12.6% who were 65 years of age or older. The median age was 39 years. For every 100 females there were 103.8 males. For every 100 females age 18 and over, there were 101.2 males.

The median income for a household in the township was $43,355, and the median income for a family was $48,250. Males had a median income of $33,654 versus $20,714 for females. The per capita income for the township was $20,861. About 5.3% of families and 6.1% of the population were below the poverty line, including 8.0% of those under age 18 and 5.6% of those age 65 or over.
