= Westminster Titans football =

- First season: 1891
- Head coach: EJ White (interim); 1st season, 0–0 (–)
- Location: New Wilmington, Pennsylvania
- Stadium: Harold Burry Stadium (capacity: 4,500)
- Field: Memorial Field
- NCAA division: Division III
- Conference: PAC
- Colors: Navy and white

NAIA national championships
- NAIA Division II: 1970, 1976, 1977, 1988, 1989, 1994
- Website: https://athletics.westminster.edu/

The Westminster Titans football team represents Westminster College, located in New Wilmington, Pennsylvania, in college football at the NCAA Division III level. The Titans, who began playing football in 1891, compete as members of the Presidents' Athletic Conference.

Westminster has won six national championships, all during its membership with the National Association of Intercollegiate Athletics (NAIA). Five former Titans football players have been enshrined in the College Football Hall of Fame: Harold Davis, Joe Fusco, Larry Pugh, Harold Burry and Joe Micchia. Hall of Fame head coach Tuss McLaughry was not an alumnus but did coach the Titans for four years. The current head football coach of the Titans is Scott Benzel, who became head coach in 2014.

== History ==
=== Conferences ===
- 1891–1923: Independent
- 1924–1933: Tri-State Conference
- 1834–1957: Independent
- 1958–1968: West Penn Conference
- 1969–1993: NAIA / NAIA Division II independent
- 1994–1997: Mid-States Football Association
- 1998: Midwest Intercollegiate Football Conference
- 1999: Great Lakes Intercollegiate Athletic Conference
- 2000–present: Presidents' Athletic Conference

== Championships ==
=== National championships ===
Year	Association	Division	Head coach	Record	Opponent	Result
1970	NAIA (6)	Division II (6)	Harold Burry (1)	10–0	Anderson (IN)	W, 21–16
1976	NAIA (6)	Division II (6)	Joe Fusco (4)	10–1	Redlands	W, 20–13
1977	NAIA (6)	Division II (6)	Joe Fusco (4)	11–0	Cal Lutheran	W, 17–9
1988	NAIA (6)	Division II (6)	Joe Fusco (4)	14–0	Wisconsin–La Crosse	W, 17–9
1989	NAIA (6)	Division II (6)	Joe Fusco (4)	13–0	Wisconsin–La Crosse	W, 51–30
1994	NAIA (6)	Division II (6)	Gene Nicholson (1)	12–2 (4–0 MSFA)	Pacific Lutheran	W, 27–7

== Postseason appearances ==
=== NAIA playoffs ===
The Titans have made seventeen appearances in the NAIA playoffs, with a combined record of 31–11 and six national championships.

Year	Round	Opponent	Result
1970	Semifinals; National Championship	Edinboro; Anderson (IN)	W, 20–7; W, 21–16
1971	Semifinals; National Championship	Carthage; Cal Lutheran	W, 28–28; L, 14–30
1976	Semifinals; National Championship	Texas Lutheran; Redlands	W, 31–0; W, 20–13
1977	Semifinals; National Championship	Concord; Cal Lutheran	W, 14–13; W, 17–9
1981	Quarterfinals; Semifinals	Anderson (IN); Concordia Moorhead	W, 21–6; L, 17–23
1982	Quarterfinals; Semifinals	Wilmington (OH); Linfield	W, 14–7; L, 9–37
1983	Quarterfinals; Semifinals	Findlay; Pacific Lutheran	W, 28–0; L, 13–16
1987	First Round; Quarterfinals	Georgetown (KY); Geneva	W, 24–17; L, 15–16
1988	First Round; Quarterfinals; Semifinals; National Championship	Austin; Bluffton; Evangel; Wisconsin–La Crosse	W, 34–12; W, 40–7; W, 26–9; W, 21–14
1989	First Round; Quarterfinals; Semifinals; National Championship	Georgetown (KY); Tarleton State; Central Washington; Wisconsin–La Crosse	W, 29–9; W, 34–0; W, 21–10; W, 51–30
1990	First Round; Quarterfinals; Semifinals; National Championship	Georgetown (KY); Tarleton State; Central Washington; Peru State	W, 47–13; W, 19–17; W, 24–17; L, 7–17
1991	First Round	Findlay	L, 8–9
1992	First Round; Quarterfinals	Friends (KS); Findlay	W, 28–0; L, 7–13
1993	First Round; Quarterfinals; Semifinals; National Championship	Georgetown (KY); Findlay; Hardin–Simmons; Pacific Lutheran	W, 20–13; W, 24–0; W, 10–0; L, 20–50
1994	First Round; Quarterfinals; Semifinals; National Championship	Findlay; Tiffin; Lambuth; Pacific Lutheran	W, 41–30; W, 42–14; W, 46–6; W, 27–7
1996	First Round; Quarterfinals	Clinch Valley; Findlay	W, 27–20; L, 9–28
1997	First Round	Findlay	L, 0–40
