= Gene Nicholson =

American football player and coach (1941–2019)

Biographical details
- Born: June 14, 1941; Mullins, South Carolina, U.S.
- Died: December 30, 2019 (aged 78); Sharon, Pennsylvania, U.S.

Playing career

Football
- 1962–1963: Slippery Rock

Coaching career (HC unless noted)

Football
- 1964–1966: Wilmington Area HS (PA) (assistant)
- 1967–1968: Wilmington Area HS (PA)
- 1969–1971: Westminster (PA) (assistant)
- 1972–1990: Westminster (PA) (DC)
- 1991–1998: Westminster (PA)

Golf
- 2001–2013: Westminster (PA)

Head coaching record
- Overall: 64–25–2 (college football)
- Tournaments: Football; 9–5 (NAIA playoffs)

Accomplishments and honors

Championships
- Football; 1 NAIA Division II (1994); 2 MSFA Mideast (1994, 1996)

Awards
- Football; NAIA Division II Coach of the Year (1994)

B. Eugene Nicholson (June 14, 1941 – December 30, 2019) was an American football coach. He served as the head football coach at the Westminster College in New Wilmington, Pennsylvania, from 1991 to 1998, compiling and record of 64–25–2 and winning the NAIA Division II Football National Championship in 1994. Nicholson began his coaching career in 1964 at Wilmington Area High School in New Wilmington as an assistant under Joe Fusco before succeeding him as head coach in 1967. After two seasons as head coach at Wilmington, Fusco moved on to Westminster College as an assistant under Harold Burry, rejoining Fusco, who was also an assistant to Burry. Nicholson was the head men's golf coach at Westminster for 13 seasons until his retirement in 2013. He was also the head coach of the school's swimming, tennis, wrestling, and track teams.

Nicholson was born on June 14, 1941, in Mullins, South Carolina. He spent his childhood in Fayetteville, North Carolina, Germany, and Brentwood, Pennsylvania, graduating in 1959 from Brentwood High School. Nicholson died on December 30, 2019, at Sharon Regional Medical Center in Sharon, Pennsylvania.

== Head coaching record ==
=== College football ===
Year	Team	Overall	Conference	Standing	Bowl/playoffs	NAIA^{#}
Westminster Titans (NAIA Division II independent) (1991–1993)
1991	Westminster	7–3			L NAIA Division II First Round	5
1992	Westminster	10–1			L NAIA Division II Quarterfinal	1
1993	Westminster	10–3			L NAIA Division II Championship	4
Westminster Titans (Mid-States Football Association) (1994–1997)
1994	Westminster	12–2	4–0	1st (MEL)	W NAIA Division II Championship	3
1995	Westminster	4–3–2	2–1–1	3rd (MEL)		
1996	Westminster	9–3	5–1	T–1st (MEL)	L NAIA Division II Quarterfinal	9
1997	Westminster	9–2	5–1	2nd (MEL)	L NAIA First Round	8
Westminster Titans (Midwest Intercollegiate Football Conference) (1998)
1998	Westminster	3–8	2–7	12th		
Westminster:		64–25–2	18–10–1			
Total:		64–25–2				
National championship Conference title Conference division title or championship game berth
^{#}Rankings from final NAIA Division II poll from 1991 to 1996, final NAIA poll in 1997.
