= Phi Sigma Gamma =

American osteopathic medical fraternity

- ΦΣΓ
- Founded: April 28, 1915; 111 years ago Chicago
- Type: Professional
- Affiliation: Independent
- Status: Active
- Emphasis: Osteopathic Medicine
- Scope: Local
- Motto: Mens et Manus
- Colors: Blue and White
- Flower: White carnation
- Publication: The Speculum
- Chapters: 1 active
- Headquarters: 270 W. Walnut Lane; Philadelphia, Pennsylvania 19144; United States

Phi Sigma Gamma (ΦΣΓ or PSG) is an American men's osteopathic medical fraternity. It was established in 1915 in Chicago, Illinois, through the merger of two professional fraternities.

== History ==
Phi Sigma Gamma was established in Chicago, Illinois by a merger between two previously existing osteopathic fraternities, Phi Sigma Beta and Phi Omicron Gamma, each of which had three chapters at the time. The date of the merger has been reported both as 1915 and as April 1916. The mission of Phi Sigma Gamma is to facilitate the creation and maintenance of professional, as well as social, relationships between medical students and practicing physicians.

The Phi chapter at Texas A&M University was founded by Thomas Bizzell, the son of the university President William Bizzell. The fraternity was originally formed in the academic year of 1915–1916 with president Bizzell's home in Bryan as a base of operations. A seventh chapter was added to the original six in 1917. In 1920, the fraternity had seven chapters and 421 members.

In the 21st century, the only remaining chapter is the Zeta chapter at Philadelphia College of Osteopathic Medicine (PCOM); it is also the only fraternity remaining at PCOM. The PSG headquarters is at 270 W. Walnut Lane in Philadelphia, Pennsylvania.

== Symbols ==
Phi Sigma Gamma's motto is Mens et Manus. Its badge is triangular with two bevels. Its raised center features a spinal cord section in white enamel. The second bevel is black and includes the Greek letters Φ, Σ, and Γ in the corners. The fraternity's colors are blue and black. Its flower is the white carnation. It annual publication is The Speculum.

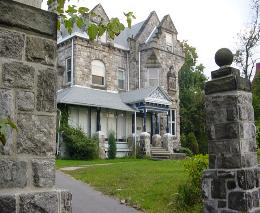
Chapter house of Zeta chapter

== Chapter house ==
During the 1950s and 1960s, the Zeta chapter at Philadelphia College of Osteopathic Medicine was adjacent to the campus on 48th Street in Philadelphia.

The fraternity negotiated to purchase the Phelan Mansion in the 1976–1977 academic year. The former Phelan Mansion had been converted into a long-term care nursing facility but no longer met the codes for a nursing facility. In the fall of 1977, Phi Sigma Gamma moved into its new chapter house at 270 W. Walnut Lane in Philadelphia.

== Membership ==
Membership is open to all male students who have good standing at the Philadelphia College of Osteopathic Medicine.

== Chapters ==
In the following list, active chapters are noted in bold and inactive chapters are noted by italics.

Chapter	Charter date and range	Institution	Location	Status	Ref.
Alpha	April 28, 1915 – 19xx ?	American School of Osteopathy	Kirksville, Missouri	Inactive	
Beta	1915–19xx ?	College of Osteopathic Physicians and Surgeons	Los Angeles, California	Inactive	
Gamma	1915–19xx ?	Chicago College of Osteopathy	Chicago, Illinois	Inactive	
Delta	1915–19xx ?	Des Moines College of Osteopathy	Des Moines, Iowa	Inactive	
Epsilon	1915–after 1997	Central College of Osteopathy	Kansas City, Missouri	Inactive	
**Zeta**	1915	Philadelphia College of Osteopathic Medicine	Philadelphia, Pennsylvania	Active	
Eta	1917–19xx ?	Massachusetts College of Osteopathy	Boston, Massachusetts	Inactive	
Phi	1916–1941	Texas A&M College of Veterinary Medicine & Biomedical Sciences	College Station, Texas	Inactive	

== Controversies and member misconduct ==
In 1919, to protest the United States entering World War I, Phi chapter changed the order of its Greek letters to "GPS," rather than PSG.

In 1941, freshman student Brian Michael Fitz died of alcohol poisoning at the Phi chapter at Texas A&M College of Veterinary Medicine & Biomedical Sciences. The university revoked the fraternity's official status.
