= 1989 NAIA Division II football season =

American college football season

- Regular season: August–November 1989
- Postseason: November–December 1989
- National Championship: Canton, OH
- Champions: Westminster (PA) (5)

The 1989 NAIA Division II football season, as part of the 1989 college football season in the United States and the 34th season of college football sponsored by the NAIA, was the 20th season of play of the NAIA Division II for football.

The season was played from August to November 1989 and culminated in the 1989 NAIA Division II Football National Championship, played at a neutral field in Canton, Ohio.

In rematch of the previous year's final, the Westminster Titans repeated as national champion by defeating the Wisconsin–La Crosse Eagles, 51–30, to win their fifth NAIA national title.

== Conference changes ==
- This is the final season that the NAIA officially recognizes football champions from the Illini–Badger Football Conference and the Wisconsin State University Conference. Both conferences would eventually join NCAA Division III; the IBFC would continue to sponsor football until 2007 while the WSUC, which would evolve into the Wisconsin Intercollegiate Athletic Conference in 1997, continues to sponsor the sport.

== Conference standings ==
1989 Columbia Football Association standings
	Conf.					Overall
Team	W		L		T	W		L		T
Mount Hood League
No. 19 Lewis & Clark x^	5	–	1	–	0	7	–	3	–	0
Willamette	4	–	1	–	1	6	–	2	–	1
Southern Oregon	4	–	1	–	1	5	–	3	–	1
Oregon Tech	3	–	2	–	1	5	–	3	–	1
Pacific (OR)	2	–	3	–	1	3	–	5	–	1
Western Oregon	1	–	5	–	0	1	–	7	–	0
Eastern Oregon	0	–	6	–	0	0	–	9	–	0
Mount Rainier League
No. 2 Central Washington x^	5	–	0	–	1	10	–	1	–	1
No. 17 Pacific Lutheran	4	–	1	–	1	6	–	2	–	1
No. 21 Western Washington	4	–	2	–	0	7	–	2	–	0
No. 25 Linfield	4	–	2	–	0	6	–	3	–	0
Simon Fraser	1	–	5	–	0	3	–	6	–	0
Whitworth	1	–	5	–	0	3	–	6	–	0
Puget Sound	1	–	5	–	0	1	–	8	–	0
x – League champion/co-champions ^ – NAIA Division II playoff participant; Rankings from NAIA Division II poll

1989 Frontier Conference football standings
	Conf.					Overall
Team	W		L		T	W		L		T
No. 15 Carroll (MT) $^	6	–	0	–	0	9	–	2	–	0
Rocky Mountain	3	–	3	–	0	5	–	5	–	0
Western Montana	2	–	4	–	0	3	–	4	–	0
Montana Tech	1	–	5	–	0	3	–	7	–	0
$ – Conference champion; ^ – NAIA Division II playoff participant; Rankings from NAIA Division II poll

1989 Heart of America Athletic Conference football standings
	Conf.					Overall
Team	W		L		T	W		L		T
No. 3 Missouri Valley $^	7	–	0	–	0	10	–	2	–	0
No. 12 Baker ^	6	–	1	–	0	10	–	2	–	0
Tarkio	4	–	2	–	1	4	–	5	–	1
William Jewell	4	–	3	–	0	5	–	5	–	0
Evangel	3	–	4	–	0	3	–	6	–	0
Graceland	2	–	4	–	1	4	–	4	–	1
Culver–Stockton	1	–	6	–	0	3	–	7	–	0
MidAmerica Nazarene	0	–	7	–	0	0	–	9	–	0
+ – Conference co-champions; ^ – NAIA Division II playoff participant; Rankings from NAIA Division II poll

1989 Illini–Badger–Hawkeye Football Conference standings
	Conf.					Overall
Team	W		L		T	W		L		T
Greenville $	6	–	0	–	0	7	–	1	–	1
No. 16 Concordia (WI)	5	–	0	–	0	8	–	1	–	0
Iowa Wesleyan	5	–	1	–	0	7	–	4	–	0
Eureka	4	–	2	–	0	4	–	6	–	0
Blackburn	3	–	3	–	0	3	–	3	–	0
MacMurray	1	–	4	–	0	3	–	7	–	0
Concordia (IL)	1	–	4	–	1	2	–	6	–	1
Lakeland	1	–	5	–	0	2	–	7	–	2
$ – Conference champion; Rankings from NAIA Division II poll

1989 Indiana Collegiate Athletic Conference football standings
	Conf.					Overall
Team	W		L		T	W		L		T
Hanover $^	7	–	0	–	0	9	–	1	–	1
Taylor	5	–	1	–	1	7	–	2	–	1
DePauw	4	–	1	–	2	6	–	2	–	2
Franklin (IN)	5	–	2	–	0	6	–	4	–	0
Wabash	3	–	4	–	0	5	–	4	–	0
Rose–Hulman	3	–	4	–	0	5	–	4	–	1
Anderson (IN)	1	–	6	–	0	2	–	8	–	0
Manchester	0	–	7	–	0	0	–	10	–	0
$ – Conference champion; ^ – NAIA Division II playoff participant None of the conference members played a full round-robin; each had one or more games against non-conference opponents designated as "wild card" games that counted in the conference standings.

1989 Kansas Collegiate Athletic Conference football standings
	Conf.					Overall
Team	W		L		T	W		L		T
No. 5 St. Mary of the Plains $^	9	–	0	–	0	10	–	1	–	0
No. 14 Bethany (KS)	8	–	1	–	0	8	–	1	–	0
Southwestern (KS)	7	–	2	–	0	7	–	3	–	0
Kansas Wesleyan	5	–	4	–	0	6	–	4	–	0
Bethel (KS)	4	–	5	–	0	5	–	5	–	0
McPherson	4	–	5	–	0	5	–	5	–	0
Ottawa	3	–	6	–	0	3	–	7	–	0
Friends	2	–	7	–	0	3	–	7	–	0
Sterling	2	–	7	–	0	2	–	7	–	0
Tabor	1	–	8	–	0	1	–	9	–	0
$ – Conference champion; ^ – NAIA Division II playoff participant; Rankings from NAIA Division II poll

1989 Mid-South Conference football standings
	Conf.					Overall
Team	W		L		T	W		L		T
No. 18 Georgetown (KY) $^	6	–	0	–	0	7	–	3	–	1
Cumberland (KY)	5	–	1	–	0	7	–	3	–	0
Union (KY)	3	–	3	–	0	4	–	5	–	1
Evansville	3	–	3	–	0	4	–	6	–	0
Campbellsville	2	–	3	–	1	2	–	7	–	1
Kentucky Wesleyan	1	–	4	–	1	3	–	6	–	1
Tennessee Wesleyan	0	–	6	–	0	0	–	10	–	0
$ – Conference champion; ^ – NAIA Division II playoff participant; Rankings from NAIA Division II poll

1989 Nebraska Intercollegiate Athletic Conference football standings
	Conf.					Overall
Team	W		L		T	W		L		T
No. 7 Nebraska Wesleyan $^	5	–	0	–	0	10	–	2	–	0
Midland	3	–	2	–	0	5	–	4	–	0
Doane	3	–	2	–	0	5	–	4	–	1
Dana	2	–	3	–	0	6	–	4	–	0
Hastings	2	–	3	–	0	4	–	6	–	0
Concordia (NE)	0	–	5	–	0	1	–	8	–	0
$ – Conference champion; ^ – NAIA Division II playoff participant; Rankings from NAIA Division II poll

1989 North Dakota College Athletic Conference football standings
	Conf.					Overall
Team	W		L		T	W		L		T
No. 8 Dickinson State $^	5	–	0	–	0	9	–	2	–	0
Valley City State	4	–	1	–	0	6	–	3	–	0
Minot State	3	–	2	–	0	4	–	5	–	0
Mary	2	–	3	–	0	4	–	5	–	0
Mayville State	1	–	4	–	0	4	–	5	–	0
Jamestown	0	–	5	–	0	1	–	8	–	0
$ – Conference champion; ^ – NAIA Division II playoff participant; Rankings from NAIA Division II poll

1989 South Dakota Intercollegiate Conference football standings
	Conf.					Overall
Team	W		L		T	W		L		T
Sioux Falls +	4	–	1	–	0	7	–	2	–	1
Black Hills State +	4	–	1	–	0	4	–	5	–	0
Dakota Wesleyan +	4	–	1	–	0	5	–	5	–	0
Huron	2	–	3	–	0	4	–	6	–	0
South Dakota Tech	1	–	4	–	0	1	–	8	–	0
Dakota State	0	–	5	–	0	1	–	9	–	0
+ – Conference co-champions

1989 Tri-State Athletic Conference football standings
	Conf.					Overall
Team	W		L		T	W		L		T
No. 6 Peru State $^	3	–	0	–	0	8	–	2	–	0
Northwestern (IA)	2	–	1	–	0	6	–	4	–	1
Benedictine (KS)	1	–	2	–	0	6	–	4	–	0
Westmar	0	–	3	–	0	4	–	6	–	1
$ – Conference champion; ^ – NAIA Division II playoff participant; Rankings from NAIA Division II poll

1989 Texas Intercollegiate Athletic Association football standings
	Conf.					Overall
Team	W		L		T	W		L		T
No. 20 Tarleton State +^	8	–	2	–	0	9	–	3	–	0
No. 23 Howard Payne +	8	–	2	–	0	8	–	3	–	0
Austin	7	–	3	–	0	7	–	3	–	0
Sul Ross	3	–	7	–	0	3	–	7	–	0
McMurry	2	–	8	–	0	2	–	8	–	0
Midwestern State	2	–	8	–	0	2	–	8	–	0
+ – Conference co-champions; ^ – NAIA Division II playoff participant; Rankings from NAIA Division II poll

1989 Wisconsin State University Conference football standings
	Conf.					Overall
Team	W		L		T	W		L		T
No. 4 Wisconsin–La Crosse $^	7	–	1	–	0	12	–	2	–	0
No. 9 Wisconsin–Stevens Point ^	6	–	1	–	1	8	–	2	–	1
No. 22 Wisconsin–River Falls	6	–	2	–	0	7	–	3	–	0
Wisconsin–Platteville	5	–	2	–	1	6	–	2	–	1
No. 24 Wisconsin–Eau Claire	5	–	3	–	0	7	–	3	–	0
Wisconsin–Whitewater	2	–	5	–	1	4	–	5	–	1
Wisconsin–Stout	2	–	6	–	0	3	–	7	–	0
Wisconsin–Oshkosh	1	–	6	–	1	3	–	6	–	1
Wisconsin–Superior	0	–	8	–	0	1	–	9	–	0
$ – Conference champion; ^ – NAIA Division II playoff participant; Rankings from NAIA Division II poll

1989 NAIA Division II independents football records
	Conf.			Overall
Team	W	L	T	W		L		T
No. 1 Westminster (PA) ^		–		13	–	0	–	0
No. 10 Chadron State ^		–		8	–	2	–	0
No. 13 St. Francis (IL)		–		8	–	2	–	0
Findlay		–		7	–	3	–	0
Bluffton		–		6	–	3	–	0
Geneva		–		6	–	3	–	0
Wilmington (OH)		–		5	–	5	–	0
Azusa Pacific		–		4	–	5	–	0
Waynesburg		–		4	–	7	–	0
St. Ambrose		–		3	–	6	–	0
Tiffin		–		2	–	8	–	0
Oklahoma Panhandle State		–		0	–	10	–	0
^ – NAIA Division II playoff participant; Rankings from NAIA Division II poll

== Conference champions ==
Conference	Champion	Record
Columbia	Mount Rainier League: Central Washington; Mount Hood League: Lewis & Clark	5–0–1; 5–1
Frontier	Carroll (MT)	6–0
Heart of America	Missouri Valley	7–0
Illini-Badger	Greenville	8–1
Kansas	St. Mary of the Plains	9–0
Mid-South	Georgetown (KY)	6–0
Nebraska	Nebraska Wesleyan	5–0
North Dakota	Dickinson State	5–0
South Dakota	Dakota Wesleyan; Sioux Falls	4–1
WSUC	Wisconsin–La Crosse	7–1

== Rankings ==
Final NAIA Division II poll rankings:

Rank	Team (first place votes)	Record (thru Nov. 11)	Points
1	Westminster (PA) (21)	9–0	525
2	Central Washington	8–0–1	499
3	Missouri Valley	9–1	470
4	Wisconsin–La Crosse	9–1	457
5	St. Mary of the Plains	10–0	426
6	Peru State	8–1	402
7	Nebraska Wesleyan	9–1	381
8	Dickinson State	8–1	356
9	Wisconsin–Stevens Point	8–1–1	351
10	Chadron State	8–1	323
11	Hanover	9–0–1	320
12	Baker	8–1	287
13	St. Francis (IL)	8–2	274
14	Bethany (KS)	8–1	270
15	Carroll (MT)	9–1	261
16	Concordia (WI)	8–1	217
17	Pacific Lutheran	6–2–1	149
18	Georgetown (KY)	7–2–1	140
19	Lewis & Clark	7–2	137
20	Tarleton State	8–2	116
21	Western Washington	7–2	107
22	Wisconsin–River Falls	7–3	87
23	Howard Payne	8–3	66
24	Wisconsin–Eau Claire	7–3	40
25	Linfield	6–3	33

== Postseason ==
First Round; Campus sites
Georgetown (KY)	9
Westminster (PA)*	29
Tarleton State	16
St. Mary of the Plains*	6
Carroll (MT)	28
Dickinson State*	37
Lewis & Clark	0
Central Washington*	51
Baker	30
Peru State*	27
Hanover	27
Missouri Valley*	48
Nebraska Wesleyan	46
Chadron State*	43
Wisconsin–Stevens Point	20
Wisconsin–La Crosse*	30

Quarterfinals; Campus sites
Westminster (PA)	34
Tarleton State*	0
Dickinson State*	7
Central Washington	49
Baker	35
Missouri Valley*	28
Nebraska Wesleyan*	0
Wisconsin–La Crosse	29

Semifinals; Campus sites
Westminster (PA)	21
Central Washington ‡	10
Baker*	6
Wisconsin–La Crosse	21

Championship; Canton, OH
Westminster (PA)	51
Wisconsin–La Crosse	30

- ‡ Game played at Puyallup, Washington

== See also ==
- 1989 NCAA Division I-A football season
- 1989 NCAA Division I-AA football season
- 1989 NCAA Division II football season
- 1989 NCAA Division III football season
