= 2023 American Southwest Conference football season =

- Sport: Football
- Teams: 8
- Champion: Hardin–Simmons

Football seasons
- 2022 2024

2023 American Southwest Conference football standings
	Conf.			Overall
Team	W		L	W		L
No. 16 Hardin–Simmons $^	6	–	0	9	–	2
Mary Hardin–Baylor	5	–	1	6	–	4
Howard Payne	3	–	3	6	–	4
McMurry	3	–	3	6	–	4
East Texas Baptist	3	–	3	5	–	5
Texas Lutheran	1	–	5	2	–	8
Austin	0	–	6	1	–	9
Sul Ross*	0	–	0	4	–	6
$ – Conference champion; ^ – NCAA Division III playoff participant; * Note: Sul Ross ineligible for D3 postseason play and conference games due to start of transition to D2.; Rankings from D3Football.com

The 2023 American Southwest Conference football season was the season of college football played by the eight member schools of the American Southwest Conference (ASC) as part of the 2023 NCAA Division III football season. The 2023 Hardin–Simmons Cowboys football team compiled a 9–2 record (6–0 in conference games), won the ASC championship, and made it to the NCAA Division III first round where they lost to Trinity (TX) 20–6.

== Teams ==
=== Hardin–Simmons ===
2023 Hardin–Simmons Cowboys football

ASC champion

NCAA Division III First Round, L 6–20 vs Trinity (TX)
- Conference: American Southwest Conference

Ranking
- D3Football.com: No. 16
- Record: 9–2 (6–0 ASC)
- Head coach: Jesse Burleson (13th season)
- Offensive coordinator: Jeff Whitehead (13th season)
- Defensive coordinator: Zach Wilkerson (10th season)
- Home stadium: Shelton Stadium

The 2023 Hardin–Simmons Cowboys football team represented Hardin–Simmons University of Abilene, Texas. In their 13th year under head coach Jesse Burleson, the team compiled a 9–2 record (6–0 against ASC opponents), won the ASC championship, and made it to the NCAA Division III first round where they lost to Trinity (TX) 20–6.

Date	Opponent	Site	Result	Attendance	Source
September 1	Albright*	Shelton Stadium; Abilene, TX	W 47–3	2,804	
September 9	at No. 11 Wisconsin–La Crosse*	Veterans Memorial Stadium; La Crosse, WI	W 28–21	3,183	
September 22	at Endicott*	Hempstead Stadium; Beverly, MA	L 10–37	2,237	
September 30	Howard Payne	Shelton Stadium; Abilene, TX	W 40–33	2,611	
October 7	at McMurry	Wilford Moore Stadium; Abilene, TX	W 19–16	0	
October 14	Texas Lutheran	Shelton Stadium; Abilene, TX	W 27–22	3,122	
October 21	at Sul Ross*	Jackson Field; Alpine, TX	W 55–7	194	
October 28	Mary Hardin–Baylor	Shelton Stadium; Abilene, TX	W 24–14	3,421	
November 4	at Austin	Apple Stadium; Sherman, TX	W 59–19	2,743	
November 11	at East Texas Baptist	Ornelas Stadium; Marshall, TX	W 42–27	1,003	
November 18	at No. 6 Trinity (TX)*	Trinity Stadium; San Antonio, TX (NCAA Division III First Round)	L 6–20	1,069	
*Non-conference game; Rankings from Coaches' Poll released prior to the game

=== Mary Hardin–Baylor ===
2023 Mary Hardin–Baylor Crusaders football
- Conference: American Southwest Conference
- Record: 6–4 (5–1 ASC)
- Head coach: Larry Harmon (2nd season)
- Offensive coordinator: Andy Padron (2nd season)
- Defensive coordinator: Jack Johnson (2nd season)
- Home stadium: Crusader Stadium

The 2023 Mary Hardin–Baylor Crusaders football team represented the University of Mary Hardin–Baylor of Belton, Texas. In their second year under head coach Larry Harmon, the team compiled a 6–4 record (5–1 against ASC opponents) and finished second in the ASC.

Date	Opponent	Site	Result	Attendance	Source
September 2	at No. 23 Wisconsin–River Falls*	Ramer Field; River Falls, WI	L 22–45	2,124	
September 9	at No. 5 Trinity (TX)*	Trinity Stadium; San Antonio, TX	L 16–35	1,776	
September 16	No. 4 Wisconsin–Whitewater*	Crusader Stadium; Belton, TX	L 14–17	2,500	
September 23	McMurry^{†}	Crusader Stadium; Belton, TX	W 50–9	3,828	
October 7	at Texas Lutheran	Bulldog Stadium; Seguin, TX	W 55–21	310	
October 14	Sul Ross*	Crusader Stadium; Belton, TX	W 37–13	3,307	
October 21	at Austin	Apple Stadium; Sherman, TX	W 49–14	0	
October 28	at No. 20 Hardin–Simmons	Shelton Stadium; Abilene, TX	L 14–24	3,421	
November 4	East Texas Baptist	Crusader Stadium; Belton, TX	W 21–12	2,850	
November 11	at Howard Payne	Gordon Wood Stadium; Brownwood, TX	W 35–10	2,155	
*Non-conference game; ^{†}Homecoming; Rankings from Coaches' Poll released prior to the game

=== Howard Payne ===
2023 Howard Payne Yellow Jackets football
- Conference: American Southwest Conference
- Record: 6–4 (3–3 ASC)
- Head coach: Kevin Bachtel (1st season)
- Offensive coordinator: Brad Wilson (1st season)
- Co-defensive coordinators: Nick Forde (1st season); Cade Gray (1st season)
- Home stadium: Gordon Wood Stadium

The 2023 Howard Payne Yellow Jackets football team represented Howard Payne University of Brownwood, Texas. In their first year under head coach Kevin Bachtel, the team compiled a 6–4 record (3–3 against ASC opponents) and finished tied for third in the ASC.

Date	Opponent	Site	Result	Attendance	Source
September 2	at George Fox*	Stoffer Stadium; Newberg, OR	W 17–3	1,531	
September 9	SAGU*	Gordon Wood Stadium; Brownwood, TX	W 42–10	1,275	
September 16	Lyon*	Gordon Wood Stadium; Brownwood, TX	W 85–0	1,525	
September 30	at No. 18 Hardin–Simmons	Shelton Stadium; Abilene, TX	L 33–40	2,611	
October 7	East Texas Baptist	Gordon Wood Stadium; Brownwood, TX	W 28–14	1,325	
October 14	Austin^{†}	Gordon Wood Stadium; Brownwood, TX	W 35–11	3,125	
October 21	at McMurry	Wilford Moore Stadium; Abilene, TX	L 21–45	200	
October 28	Texas Lutheran	Gordon Wood Stadium; Brownwood, TX	W 31–27	1,100	
November 4	at Sul Ross	Jackson Field; Alpine, TX	L 42–47	269	
November 11	Mary Hardin–Baylor	Gordon Wood Stadium; Brownwood, TX	L 10–35	2,155	
*Non-conference game; ^{†}Homecoming; Rankings from Coaches' Poll released prior to the game

=== McMurry ===
2023 McMurry War Hawks football
- Conference: American Southwest Conference
- Record: 6–4 (3–3 ASC)
- Head coach: Jordan Neal (5th season)
- Defensive coordinator: Will Snyder (2nd season)
- Home stadium: Wilford Moore Stadium

The 2023 McMurry War Hawks football team represented McMurry University of Abilene, Texas. In their fifth year under head coach Jordan Neal, the team compiled a 6–4 record (3–3 against ASC opponents) and finished tied for third in the ASC.

Date	Opponent	Site	Result	Attendance	Source
August 31	vs. Birmingham–Southern*	War Memorial Stadium; Little Rock, AR	L 19–20	25	
September 9	at Millsaps*	Harper Davis Field; Jackson, MS	W 53–2	257	
September 23	at No. 23 Mary Hardin–Baylor	Crusader Stadium; Belton, TX	L 9–50	3,828	
September 30	Lyon*	Wilford Moore Stadium; Abilene, TX	W 52–14	3,100	
October 7	No. 5 Hardin–Simmons	Wilford Moore Stadium; Abilene, TX	L 16–19 (OT)	0	
October 14	at East Texas Baptist	Ornelas Stadium; Marshall, TX	L 13–14	1,732	
October 21	Howard Payne	Wilford Moore Stadium; Abilene, TX	W 45–21	200	
October 28	Austin^{†}	Wilford Moore Stadium; Abilene, TX	W 51–13	1,124	
November 4	at Texas Lutheran	Bulldog Stadium; Seguin, TX	W 36–33	600	
November 11	Sul Ross*	Wilford Moore Stadium; Abilene, TX	W 43–23	100	
*Non-conference game; ^{†}Homecoming; Rankings from Coaches' Poll released prior to the game

=== East Texas Baptist ===
2023 East Texas Baptist Tigers football
- Conference: American Southwest Conference
- Record: 5–5 (3–3 ASC)
- Head coach: Calvin Ruzicka (1st season)
- Offensive coordinator: Trevor Hopkins (1st season)
- Defensive coordinator: Jordan Collins (1st season)
- Home stadium: Ornelas Stadium

The 2023 East Texas Baptist Tigers football team represented East Texas Baptist University of Marshall, Texas. In their first year under head coach Calvin Ruzicka, the team compiled a 5–5 record (3–3 against ASC opponents) and finished tied for third in the ASC.

Date	Opponent	Site	Result	Attendance	Source
September 1	at Louisiana Christian*	Wildcat Field; Pineville, LA	L 14–34	4,221	
September 9	Hendrix*	Ornelas Stadium; Marshall, TX	W 38–37	671	
September 16	No. 23 Wisconsin–Oshkosh*	Ornelas Stadium; Marshall, TX	L 7–60	379	
September 30	Austin	Ornelas Stadium; Marshall, TX	W 35–7	2,017	
October 7	at Howard Payne	Gordon Wood Stadium; Brownwood, TX	L 14–28	1,325	
October 14	McMurry	Ornelas Stadium; Marshall, TX	W 14–13	1,732	
October 21	at Texas Lutheran	Bulldog Stadium; Seguin, TX	W 16–6	1,300	
October 28	Sul Ross^{†}	Ornelas Stadium; Marshall, TX	W 24–10	1,276	
November 4	at Mary Hardin–Baylor	Crusader Stadium; Belton, TX	L 12–21	2,850	
November 11	No. 19 Hardin–Simmons	Ornelas Stadium; Marshall, TX	L 27–42	1,003	
*Non-conference game; ^{†}Homecoming; Rankings from Coaches' Poll released prior to the game

=== Texas Lutheran ===
2023 Texas Lutheran Bulldogs football
- Conference: American Southwest Conference
- Record: 2–8 (1–5 ASC)
- Head coach: Neal LaHue (2nd season)
- Defensive coordinator: Beau Grech (2nd season)
- Home stadium: Bulldog Stadium

The 2023 Texas Lutheran Bulldogs football team represented Texas Lutheran University of Seguin, Texas. In their second year under head coach Neal LaHue, the team compiled a 2–8 record (1–5 against ASC opponents) and finished sixth in the ASC.

Date	Opponent	Site	Result	Attendance	Source
September 2	at No. 21 Wisconsin–Oshkosh*	Titan Stadium; Oshkosh, WI	L 31–48	2,396	
September 9	at Southwestern (TX)*	Birkelbach Field; Georgetown, TX	W 39–7	2,400	
September 16	Ave Maria*	Bulldog Stadium; Seguin, TX	L 14–27	500	
September 30	at Sul Ross*	Jackson Field; Alpine, TX	L 34–37	194	
October 7	No. 22 Mary Hardin–Baylor	Bulldog Stadium; Seguin, TX	L 21–55	310	
October 14	at No. 20 Hardin–Simmons	Shelton Stadium; Abilene, TX	L 22–27	3,122	
October 21	East Texas Baptist^{†}	Bulldog Stadium; Seguin, TX	L 6–16	1,300	
October 28	at Howard Payne	Gordon Wood Stadium; Brownwood, TX	L 27–31	1,100	
November 4	McMurry	Bulldog Stadium; Seguin, TX	L 33–36	600	
November 11	Austin	Bulldog Stadium; Seguin, TX	W 29–10	1,000	
*Non-conference game; ^{†}Homecoming; Rankings from Coaches' Poll released prior to the game

=== Austin ===
2023 Austin Kangaroos football
- Conference: American Southwest Conference
- Record: 1–9 (0–6 ASC)
- Head coach: Tony Joe White (1st season)
- Defensive coordinator: George Love (1st season)
- Home stadium: Apple Stadium

The 2023 Austin Kangaroos football team represented Austin College of Sherman, Texas. In their first year under head coach Tony Joe White, the team compiled a 1–9 record (0–6 against ASC opponents) and finished last in the ASC.

Date	Opponent	Site	Result	Attendance	Source
September 2	Nebraska Wesleyan*	Apple Stadium; Sherman, TX	L 7–19	1,253	
September 9	at Rhodes*	Crain Field; Memphis, TN	L 17–19	1,200	
September 23	at Crown*	Old National Bank Stadium; St. Bonifacius, MN	W 34–23	125	
September 30	at East Texas Baptist	Ornelas Stadium; Marshall, TX	L 7–35	2,017	
October 7	Sul Ross*	Apple Stadium; Sherman, TX	L 7–49	986	
October 14	at Howard Payne	Gordon Wood Stadium; Brownwood, TX	L 11–35	3,125	
October 21	No. 23 Mary Hardin–Baylor	Apple Stadium; Sherman, TX	L 14–49	0	
October 28	at McMurry	Wilford Moore Stadium; Abilene, TX	L 13–51	1,135	
November 4	No. 20 Hardin–Simmons^{†}	Apple Stadium; Sherman, TX	L 19–59	0	
November 11	at Texas Lutheran	Bulldog Stadium; Seguin, TX	L 10–29	1,000	
*Non-conference game; ^{†}Homecoming; Rankings from Coaches' Poll released prior to the game

=== Sul Ross ===
2023 Sul Ross Lobos football
- Conference: American Southwest Conference
- Record: 4–6 (0–0 ASC)
- Head coach: Barry Derickson (2nd season)
- Offensive coordinator: Christian Escobar (1st season)
- Offensive scheme: Air raid
- Defensive coordinator: Cadron Davis (1st season)
- Base defense: 3–4
- Home stadium: Jackson Field

The 2023 Sul Ross Lobos football team represented Sul Ross State University of Alpine, Texas. In their second year under head coach Barry Derickson, the team compiled a 4–6 record but was ineligible for ASC conference play due to the team's transition to the NCAA Division II's Lone Star Conference (LSC).

Date	Opponent	Site	Result	Attendance	Source
September 2	at Western New Mexico*	Ben Altamirano Field; Silver City, NM	L 28–42	635	
September 9	Eastern New Mexico*	Jackson Field; Alpine, TX	L 12–51	243	
September 16	Wayland Baptist*	Jackson Field; Alpine, TX	W 27–7	140	
September 30	Texas Lutheran*	Jackson Field; Alpine, TX	W 37–34	194	
October 7	at Austin*	Apple Stadium; Sherman, TX	W 49–7	986	
October 14	at No. 22 Mary Hardin–Baylor*	Crusader Stadium; Belton, TX	L 13–37	3,307	
October 21	No. 19 Hardin–Simmons*	Jackson Field; Alpine, TX	L 7–55	194	
October 28	at East Texas Baptist*	Ornelas Stadium; Marshall, TX	L 10–24	1,276	
November 4	Howard Payne*	Jackson Field; Alpine, TX	W 47–42	269	
November 11	at McMurry*	Wilford Moore Stadium; Abilene, TX	L 23–37	100	
*Non-conference game; Rankings from Coaches' Poll released prior to the game
