= 2024 Centenary Gentlemen football team =

American college football season

2024 Centenary Gentlemen football
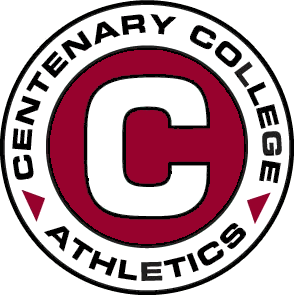
- Conference: Southern Collegiate Athletic Conference
- Record: 4–6 (4–4 SCAC)
- Head coach: Byron Dawson (1st season)
- Offensive coordinator: Keondre Wudtee (1st season)
- Offensive scheme: Spread option
- Co-defensive coordinator: Malik Preston (1st season)
- Base defense: 4–3
- Home stadium: Atkins Field

2024 Southern Collegiate Athletic Conference football standings
	Conf.			Overall
Team	W		L	W		L
Texas Lutheran +^	7	–	1	9	–	2
McMurry +	7	–	1	7	–	3
Centenary	4	–	4	4	–	6
Austin	2	–	6	2	–	8
Lyon	0	–	8	1	–	9
+ – Conference co-champions; ^ – NCAA Division III playoff participant

The 2024 Centenary Gentlemen football team represented Centenary College of Louisiana as a member of the Southern Collegiate Athletic Conference (SCAC) during the 2024 NCAA Division III football season. The Gentlemen played their home games at Atkins Field located in Shreveport, Louisiana. They were led by head coach Byron Dawson, who was the head coach of the Evangel Christian Academy Eagles from 2005 to 2019; winning five Louisiana High School Athletic Association state championships.

This was Centenary's first football season since 1947. They lost their first game against Hendrix College.

== SCAC media poll ==
The SCAC preseason media poll was released on August 19, 2024. The Gentlemen were predicted to finish third in the conference.

SCAC media poll
Predicted finish	Team	Votes (1st place)
1	McMurry	25 (5)
2	Texas Lutheran	19
3	Centenary	12
4	Austin	10
5	Lyon	9

== Schedule ==
Date	Time	Opponent	Site	Result	Attendance
September 7	7:00 p.m.	Hendrix*	Atkins Field; Shreveport, LA	L 20–43	1,978
September 14	6:00 p.m.	at Texas Lutheran	Bulldog Stadium; Seguin, TX	L 8–31	1,105
September 21	6:00 p.m.	at Austin	Apple Stadium; Sherman, TX	W 36–17	1,097
September 28	6:00 p.m.	at East Texas Baptist*	Ornelas Stadium; Marshall, TX	L 8–47	3,341
October 5	6:00 p.m.	Lyon	Atkins Field; Shreveport, LA	W 35–14	1,534
October 12	5:00 p.m.	McMurry	Atkins Field; Shreveport, LA	L 10–28	1,291
October 19	2:00 p.m.	at Lyon	Pioneer Stadium; Batesville, AR	W 28–21	673
October 26	6:00 p.m.	Austin^{†}	Atkins Field; Shreveport, LA	W 41–21	1,815
November 9	1:00 p.m.	Texas Lutheran	Atkins Field; Shreveport, LA	L 23–46	1,043
November 16	12:00 p.m.	at McMurry	Wilford Moore Stadium; Abilene, TX	L 12–49	2,000
*Non-conference game; ^{†}Homecoming; All times are in Central time

== Personnel ==
2024 Centenary Gentlemen football team roster
Players
Coaches
Offense

Pos.	#	Name	Class
WR	0	Kobe Chambers	Jr
WR	2	Christopher Jackson	Fr
WR	3	Braeden Board	Sr
WR	4	Devin Ardoin	So
RB	5	Bobby Shanklin Jr.	Jr
RB	6	Cedrick Allison	So
RB	7	Josh Ware	Jr
QB	8	Preston Sentino	Fr
QB	9	Zin'Tavious Smith
WR	10	Jay Richardson	So
WR	11	Byron Stewart	So
WR	13	Romelo Joseph	Fr
WR	17	Tyson Walter	Fr
QB	18	Tristen Wooten	Fr
QB	19	Vance Feuerbacher	So
WR	20	Trent Smith	Jr
RB	23	Obadiah Butler	Jr
RB	24	Rubin Seastrunk	So
WR	27	Tyrone Charlot	Jr

Defense

Pos.	#	Name	Class
DB	0	Dwayne Mills Jr.	Fr
DB	1	Delarrious Marshall	Fr
DB	2	Chaz Smith	Fr
DB	3	Bryan Washington	So
DB	4	Christopher Dade	Fr
DB	5	Branden Heard	So
DB	6	Darrell Simmons Jr.	Fr
LB	7	Ronald Finley	Fr
DB	8	Sedrick Knight Jr.	So
DL	9	Isaiah Grant	Fr
DB	12	Corinthian Walters	So
DB	14	Jacob Wilson	Fr
DB	16	Jacob Black	Fr
LB	19	Vance Feuerbacher	So
DL	22	Demetrus Gladney Jr.	Jr
LB	25	Rene Martinez III	Fr
LB	26	Devon Strickland	So
DB	27	Jay Scott	Fr
DB	28	Perrea Little	Fr
DB	29	Micaiah Birdlow	Fr

Special teams

Pos.	#	Name	Class
P	19	Vance Feuerbacher	So
K, P	52	Enrique Hernandez	Sr

Head coach

- Byron Dawson
  Head coach/defensive coordinator

Coordinators/assistant coaches

- Keondre Wudtee
  Offensive coordinator/quarterbacks
- Malik Preston
  Assistant defensive coordinator/linebackers
- Tony Savino
  Offensive line
- Calvin Brown
  Running backs
- Jenetrell Oliver
  Defensive ends

Legend

- (C) Team captain
- (S) Suspended
- (I) Ineligible
- Injured
- Redshirt

Roster

== Game summaries ==
=== Hendrix ===
	1	2	3	4	Total
Warriors	15	21	7	0	43
Gentlemen	6	0	0	14	20

Statistics	HEN	CEN
First downs	24	20
Total yards	402	290
Rushing yards	189	-9
Passing yards	213	299
Turnovers	3	1
Time of possession	34:38	25:22

Team	Category	Player	Statistics
Hendrix	Passing	Jacob Buniff	21/27, 192 yards, 4 TD
Hendrix	Rushing	Jacob Buniff	5 rushes, 47 yards
Hendrix	Receiving	Parker Turley	5 receptions, 88 yards, 2 TD
Centenary	Passing	Kody Fuentes	30/46, 299 yards, TD, INT
Centenary	Rushing	Bobby Shanklin Jr.	3 rushes, 13 yards, TD
Centenary	Receiving	Kobe Chambers	9 receptions, 106 yards

=== At Texas Lutheran ===
	1	2	3	4	Total
Gentlemen	0	0	8	0	8
Bulldogs	17	0	7	7	31

Statistics	CEN	TLU
First downs	15	21
Total yards	212	429
Rushing yards	43	287
Passing yards	169	142
Turnovers	3	2
Time of possession	27:39	32:21

Team	Category	Player	Statistics
Centenary	Passing	Kody Fuentes	18/38, 159 yards, INT
Centenary	Rushing	Zin'Tavious Smith	2 rushes, 20 yards
Centenary	Receiving	Kobe Chambers	5 receptions, 67 yards
Texas Lutheran	Passing	Caden Bosanko	12/23, 142 yards, TD, INT
Texas Lutheran	Rushing	Weston Guzman	11 rushes, 100 yards, TD
Texas Lutheran	Receiving	Lavonta Henry	4 receptions, 89 yards, TD

=== At Austin ===
	1	2	3	4	Total
Gentlemen	3	0	12	21	36
Kangaroos	3	0	7	7	17

Statistics	CEN	AC
First downs	16	21
Total yards	382	305
Rushing yards	246	118
Passing yards	136	187
Turnovers	0	3
Time of possession	28:40	31:20

Team	Category	Player	Statistics
Centenary	Passing	Kody Fuentes	9/12, 117 yards
Centenary	Rushing	Zin'Tavious Smith	10 rushes, 135 yards, 2 TD
Centenary	Receiving	Trent Smith	2 receptions, 59 yards
Austin	Passing	Jaylon Talton	11/21, 187 yards, TD
Austin	Rushing	Zyan Stewart	14 rushes, 58 yards
Austin	Receiving	Tony Penson	6 receptions, 91 yards

=== At East Texas Baptist ===
	1	2	3	4	Total
Gentlemen	2	6	0	0	8
Tigers	14	14	6	13	47

Statistics	CEN	ETX
First downs	11	25
Total yards	209	493
Rushing yards	112	252
Passing yards	97	241
Turnovers	2	1
Time of possession	27:45	32:15

Team	Category	Player	Statistics
Centenary	Passing	Zin'Tavious Smith	10/21, 97 yards, TD, INT
Centenary	Rushing	Bobby Shanklin Jr.	8 rushes, 51 yards
Centenary	Receiving	Kobe Chambers	5 receptions, 74 yards, TD
East Texas Baptist	Passing	Kaden Brown	12/21, 227 yards, 3 TD
East Texas Baptist	Rushing	Paul Woodard	14 rushes, 113 yards, 3 TD
East Texas Baptist	Receiving	Trayjen Llanas-Wilcox	5 receptions, 114 yards, 2 TD

=== Lyon ===
	1	2	3	4	Total
Scots	7	0	0	7	14
Gentlemen	0	14	14	7	35

Statistics	LYC	CEN
First downs	19	20
Total yards	263	443
Rushing yards	132	215
Passing yards	131	228
Turnovers	2	1
Time of possession	30:24	29:36

Team	Category	Player	Statistics
Lyon	Passing	Joe Galay	12/20, 88 yards, INT
Lyon	Rushing	Jaylin Babers	20 rushes, 81 yards, TD
Lyon	Receiving	Reginald Brown II	6 receptions, 40 yards
Centenary	Passing	Zin'Tavious Smith	10/14, 219 yards, 4 TD
Centenary	Rushing	Zin'Tavious Smith	12 rushes, 72 yards
Centenary	Receiving	Byron Stewart	2 receptions, 90 yards, TD

=== McMurry ===
	1	2	3	4	Total
War Hawks	6	8	14	0	28
Gentlemen	3	0	0	7	10

Statistics	MCM	CEN
First downs	15	11
Total yards	351	197
Rushing yards	100	-8
Passing yards	251	205
Turnovers	4	3
Time of possession	29:21	30:39

Team	Category	Player	Statistics
McMurry	Passing	Jess Hoel	18/32, 251 yards, TD, 3 INT
McMurry	Rushing	Drew Hagler	11 rushes, 40 yards, TD
McMurry	Receiving	Kristopher Martin	6 receptions, 146 yards, TD
Centenary	Passing	Zin'Tavious Smith	13/24, 137 yards, 2 INT
Centenary	Rushing	Obadiah Butler	6 rushes, 32 yards
Centenary	Receiving	Devin Ardoin	5 receptions, 74 yards, TD

=== At Lyon ===
	1	2	3	4	Total
Gentlemen	7	7	0	14	28
Scots	7	6	8	0	21

Statistics	CEN	LYC
First downs	24	17
Total yards	390	312
Rushing yards	80	141
Passing yards	310	171
Turnovers	0	2
Time of possession	27:47	30:16

Team	Category	Player	Statistics
Centenary	Passing	Zin'Tavious Smith	29/41, 310 yards, TD
Centenary	Rushing	Josh Ware	9 rushes, 41 yards, TD
Centenary	Receiving	Kobe Chambers	9 receptions, 134 yards, TD
Lyon	Passing	Grayson Johnson	14/18, 155 yards
Lyon	Rushing	Jaylin Babers	30 rushes, 118 yards, TD
Lyon	Receiving	Javarion Williams	3 receptions, 74 yards

=== Austin ===
	1	2	3	4	Total
Kangaroos	7	14	0	0	21
Gentlemen	3	16	7	15	41

Statistics	AC	CEN
First downs	17	23
Total yards	289	411
Rushing yards	74	202
Passing yards	215	209
Turnovers	4	1
Time of possession	25:45	34:15

Team	Category	Player	Statistics
Austin	Passing	Jaylon Talton	18/33, 215 yards, 2 TD, 4 INT
Austin	Rushing	Barrett Hudson	17 rushes, 73 yards
Austin	Receiving	Michael Cress	5 receptions, 73 yards, TD
Centenary	Passing	Zin'Tavious Smith	19/28, 149 yards, INT
Centenary	Rushing	Zin'Tavious Smith	16 rushes, 89 yards, 4 TD
Centenary	Receiving	Trent Smith	5 receptions, 94 yards, TD

=== Texas Lutheran ===
	1	2	3	4	Total
Bulldogs	7	10	19	10	46
Gentlemen	0	12	8	3	23

Statistics	TLU	CEN
First downs	21	17
Total yards	486	335
Rushing yards	227	87
Passing yards	259	248
Turnovers	0	2
Time of possession	34:08	25:52

Team	Category	Player	Statistics
Texas Lutheran	Passing	Caden Bosanko	15/26, 259 yards, TD
Texas Lutheran	Rushing	Ryker Purdy	10 rushes, 121 yards
Texas Lutheran	Receiving	Caleb Camarillo	4 receptions, 164 yards, TD
Centenary	Passing	Vance Feuerbacher	16/32, 248 yards, 2 TD, INT
Centenary	Rushing	Vance Feuerbacher	13 rushes, 70 yards, TD
Centenary	Receiving	Kobe Chambers	5 receptions, 83 yards, 2 TD

=== At McMurry ===
	1	2	3	4	Total
Gentlemen	0	6	6	0	12
War Hawks	7	16	26	0	49

Statistics	CEN	MCM
First downs	11	20
Total yards	117	492
Rushing yards	14	138
Passing yards	103	354
Turnovers	3	2
Time of possession	29:43	30:17

Team	Category	Player	Statistics
Centenary	Passing	Zin'Tavious Smith	13/20, 62 yards, TD
Centenary	Rushing	Bobby Shanklin Jr.	13 rushes, 31 yards
Centenary	Receiving	Jay Richardson	6 receptions, 47 yards
McMurry	Passing	Jess Hoel	15/23, 287 yards, 4 TD
McMurry	Rushing	Jess Hoel	14 rushes, 91 yards, 2 TD
McMurry	Receiving	Kristopher Martin	13 receptions, 212 yards, 4 TD
