= Jordan Neal =

American football coach (born c. 1985)

Current position
- Title: Head coach
- Team: McMurry
- Conference: ASC
- Record: 24–40

Biographical details
- Born: c. 1985 (age 40–41); Abilene, Texas, U.S.
- Education: Hardin–Simmons University (2005)

Playing career
- 2003–2006: Hardin–Simmons
- 2007: Limhamn Griffins
- Position: Quarterback

Coaching career (HC unless noted)
- 2007: Limhamn Griffins (QB/WR)
- 2008–2011: Howard Payne (OC/QB)
- 2012: Texas Lutheran (OL)
- 2013–2018: Hendrix (OC/QB)
- 2019–present: McMurry

Head coaching record
- Overall: 24–40

Accomplishments and honors

Championships
- 2 SCAC (2024–2025)

Awards
- ASC Offensive Player of the Year (2006); First Team All-ASC (2006); 2× Second Team All-ASC (2003–2004)

Jordan Neal (born c. 1985) is an American football coach. He is the head football coach for McMurry University, a position he has held since 2019. He also coached for the Limhamn Griffins of Sweden's Superserien, Howard Payne, Texas Lutheran, and Hendrix. He played college football for Hardin–Simmons as a quarterback and professionally for the Limhamn Griffins.

== Head coaching record ==
Year	Team	Overall	Conference	Standing	Bowl/playoffs
McMurry War Hawks (American Southwest Conference) (2019–2023)
2019	McMurry	0–10	0–9	10th	
2020–21	McMurry	2–3	1–3	4th (West)	
2021	McMurry	2–7	2–7	T–8th	
2022	McMurry	1–9	1–7	T–8th	
2023	McMurry	6–4	3–3	T–3rd	
McMurry War Hawks (Southern Collegiate Athletic Conference) (2024–2025)
2024	McMurry	7–3	7–1	T–1st	
2025	McMurry	6–4	4–1	2nd	
McMurry War Hawks (American Southwest Conference) (2026–present)
2026	McMurry	0–0	0–0		
McMurry:		24–40	18–31		
Total:		24–40			
National championship Conference title Conference division title or championship game berth
