= 2023 Sul Ross Lobos football team =

American college football season

2023 Sul Ross Lobos football
- Conference: American Southwest Conference
- Record: 4–6 (0–0 ASC)
- Head coach: Barry Derickson (2nd season)
- Offensive coordinator: Christian Escobar (1st season)
- Offensive scheme: Air raid
- Defensive coordinator: Cadron Davis (1st season)
- Base defense: 3–4
- Home stadium: Jackson Field

2023 American Southwest Conference football standings
	Conf.			Overall
Team	W		L	W		L
No. 16 Hardin–Simmons $^	6	–	0	9	–	2
Mary Hardin–Baylor	5	–	1	6	–	4
Howard Payne	3	–	3	6	–	4
McMurry	3	–	3	6	–	4
East Texas Baptist	3	–	3	5	–	5
Texas Lutheran	1	–	5	2	–	8
Austin	0	–	6	1	–	9
Sul Ross*	0	–	0	4	–	6
$ – Conference champion; ^ – NCAA Division III playoff participant; * Note: Sul Ross ineligible for D3 postseason play and conference games due to start of transition to D2.; Rankings from D3Football.com

The 2023 Sul Ross Lobos football team represented Sul Ross State University during the 2023 NCAA Division III football season as a member of the American Southwest Conference (ASC). The Lobos were led by second-year head coach Barry Derickson and played their home games at Jackson Field in Alpine, Texas. The team finished with a record of 4–6.

The 2023 season marked the first year of a transition period from Division III to Division II for the program. As a result, the Lobos were ineligible for the conference championship and postseason play. This was also the program's last season as a member of the ASC as the program will rejoin the Lone Star Conference (LSC) beginning with the 2024 season.

== Schedule ==
Date	Time	Opponent	Site	Result	Attendance
September 2	7:00 p.m.	at Western New Mexico*	Altamirano Stadium; Silver City, NM (rivalry)	L 28–42	635
September 9	12:00 p.m.	Eastern New Mexico*	Jackson Field; Alpine, TX	L 12–51	243
September 16	2:30 p.m.	Wayland Baptist*	Jackson Field; Alpine, TX	W 27–7	140
September 30	6:00 p.m.	Texas Lutheran	Jackson Field; Alpine, TX	W 37–34	194
October 7	1:00 p.m.	at Austin	Jerry E. Apple Stadium; Sherman, TX	W 49–7	986
October 14	1:00 p.m.	at Mary Hardin–Baylor	Crusader Stadium; Belton, TX	L 13–37	3,307
October 21	12:00 p.m.	No. 19 Hardin–Simmons	Jackson Field; Alpine, TX	L 7–55	194
October 28	1:00 p.m.	at East Texas Baptist	Ornelas Stadium; Marshall, TX	L 10–24	1,276
November 4	1:00 p.m.	Howard Payne^{†}	Jackson Field; Alpine, TX	W 47–42	269
November 11	1:00 p.m.	at McMurry	Wilford Moore Stadium; Abilene, TX (Battle of I-20)	L 23–37	100
*Non-conference game; ^{†}Homecoming; Rankings from D3Football.com Poll released prior to the game; All times are in Central time

== Game summaries ==
=== At Western New Mexico ===
Sul Ross Lobos at Western New Mexico Mustangs – Game summary

Quarter	1	2	3	4	Total
Lobos	0	21	7	0	28
Mustangs	7	7	14	14	42

at Ben Altamirano Field, Silver City, New Mexico

- Date: September 2
- Game time: 7:00 p.m. CDT/6:00 p.m. MDT
- Game weather: Sunny, 83 °F (28 °C)
- Game attendance: 635
- Referee: Tracy Hernandez
- Box score, Recap

Game information
First quarter
- WNM – Charles Byers 40-yard pass from Devin Larson (Tanner Bobic kick), 11:25. Mustangs 7–0. Drive: 2 plays, 43 yards, 0:33.

Second quarter

- SRS – Travell Lumpkin 5-yard pass from Adrian Martinez (Carlos Arreola kick), 13:48. Tied 7–7. Drive: 6 plays, 39 yards, 2:14.
- SRS – Kawaski Latham 77-yard pass from Adrian Martinez (Carlos Arreola kick), 7:52. Lobos 14–7. Drive: 1 play, 77 yards, 0:12.
- SRS – Vicente Luevano 15-yard pass from Adrian Martinez (Carlos Arreola kick), 2:42. Lobos 21–7. Drive: 4 plays, 51 yards, 2:10.
- WNM – Jeremiah Hartfield 18-yard pass from Devin Larson (Tanner Bobic kick), 0:17. Lobos 21–14. Drive: 9 plays, 81 yards, 2:19.

Third quarter

- SRS – Ahmonte Kendrick 21-yard pass from Andrew Martinez (Carlos Arreola kick), 7:03. Lobos 28–14. Drive: 5 plays, 55 yards, 2:08.
- WNM – Jeremiah Hartfield 38-yard pass from Devin Larson (Tanner Bobic kick), 4:13. Lobos 28–21. Drive: 6 plays, 75 yards, 2:32.
- WNM – Anthony Flores 33-yard pass from Devin Larson (Tanner Bobic kick), 1:44. Tied 28–28. Drive: 2 plays, 38 yards, 0:33.

Fourth quarter

- WNM – Charles Byers 5-yard pass from Devin Larson (Tanner Bobic kick), 11:22. Mustangs 35–28. Drive: 7 plays, 76 yards, 2:29.
- WNM – Anthony Flores 78-yard pass from Devin Larson (Tanner Bobic kick), 3:55. Mustangs 42–28. Drive: 3 plays, 80 yards, 0:55.

Statistics	SRS	WNM
First downs	22	22
Total yards	412	542
Rushing yards	50	146
Passing yards	362	396
Turnovers	4	2
Time of possession	32:41	27:19

Team	Category	Player	Statistics
Sul Ross	Passing	Andrew Martinez	23/41, 332 yards, 4 TD, 2 INT
Sul Ross	Rushing	Andrew Martinez	10 rushes, 40 yards
Sul Ross	Receiving	Kawaski Latham	5 receptions, 132 yards, TD
Western New Mexico	Passing	Devin Larsen	23/39, 396 yards, 6 TD, INT
Western New Mexico	Rushing	Marcus Higgs	8 rushes, 49 yards
Western New Mexico	Receiving	Anthony Flores	2 receptions, 111 yards, 2 TD

=== Eastern New Mexico ===
Eastern New Mexico Greyhounds at Sul Ross Lobos – Game summary

Quarter	1	2	3	4	Total
Greyhounds	7	17	14	13	51
Lobos	6	0	6	0	12

at Jackson Field, Alpine, Texas

- Date: September 9
- Game time: 12:00 p.m. CDT
- Game weather: Sunny, 90 °F (32 °C)
- Game attendance: 243
- Referee: Glenn Bamlett
- Box score, Recap

Game information
First quarter
- SRS – Isaiah Pena 7-yard pass from Andrew Martinez (kick failed), 10:28. Lobos 6–0. Drive: 8 plays, 77 yards, 4:02.
- ENM – Mario Sanches 1-yard run (Kaden Bell kick), 1:29. Greyhounds 7–6. Drive: 18 plays, 68 yards, 8:50.

Second quarter

- ENM – Kaden Bell 37-yard field goal, 8:24. Greyhounds 10–6. Drive: 13 plays, 41 yards, 6:24.
- ENM – Jonathan Watson 3-yard run (Kaden Bell kick), 3:42. Greyhounds 17–6. Drive: 6 plays, 60 yards, 2:34.
- ENM – Andre Jones 32-yard pass from Mario Sanchez (Kaden Bell kick), 0:31. Greyhounds 24–6. Drive: 2 plays, 30 yards, 0:10.

Third quarter

- ENM – Elijah Zeh 2-yard run (Kaden Bell kick), 14:00. Greyhounds 31–6. Drive: 2 plays, 75 yards, 0:53.
- SRS – Tarius McClure 15-yard pass from Andrew Martinez (run failed), 9:59. Greyhounds 31–12. Drive: 11 plays, 67 yards, 3:53.
- ENM – Mario Sanchez 2-yard run (Kaden Bell kick), 1:52. Greyhounds 38–12. Drive: 2 plays, 4 yards, 0:37.

Fourth quarter

- ENM – Michael Molio'o 13-yard pass from Mario Sanchez (Kaden Bell kick), 4:41. Greyhounds 45–12. Drive: 7 plays, 40 yards, 4:06.
- ENM – Nicholas Harper 64-yard run (kick blocked), 2:18. Greyhounds 51–12. Drive: 1 play, 64 yards, 0:13.

Statistics	ENM	SRS
First downs	16	15
Total yards	384	218
Rushing yards	272	-49
Passing yards	112	267
Turnovers	1	3
Time of possession	29:23	30:37

Team	Category	Player	Statistics
Eastern New Mexico	Passing	Mario Sanchez	4/7, 70 yards, 2 TD
Eastern New Mexico	Rushing	Jonathan Watson	7 rushes, 119 yards, TD
Eastern New Mexico	Receiving	Andre Jones	3 receptions, 93 yards, TD
Sul Ross	Passing	Andrew Martinez	21/42, 262 yards, 2 TD, 3 INT
Sul Ross	Rushing	Rodd Hudson III	6 rushes, 7 yards
Sul Ross	Receiving	Isaiah Pena	5 receptions, 112 yards, TD

=== Wayland Baptist ===
Wayland Baptist Pioneers at Sul Ross Lobos – Game summary

Quarter	1	2	3	4	Total
Pioneers	7	0	0	0	7
Lobos	0	14	10	3	27

at Jackson Field, Alpine, Texas

- Date: September 16
- Game time: 2:30 p.m. CDT
- Game weather: Rain, 68 °F (20 °C)
- Game attendance: 140
- Referee: Rex Rose
- Box score, Recap

Game information
First quarter
- WBU – Dayson Varela 26-yard pass from Davian Guajardo (Brayden Welch kick), 11:04. Pioneers 7–0. Drive: 3 plays, 27 yards, 1:17.

Second quarter

- SRS – Vicente Luevano 26-yard pass from Andrew Martinez (Carlos Arreola kick), 13:37. Tied 7–7. Drive: 6 plays, 78 yards, 2:40.
- SRS – Isaiah Pena 79-yard pass from Andrew Martinez (Carlos Arreola kick), 6:23. Lobos 14–7. Drive: 6 plays, 92 yards, 2:04.

Third quarter

- SRS – Alec Garcia 0-yard punt return (Carlos Arreola kick), 13:00. Lobos 21–7.
- SRS – Carols Arreola 46-yard field goal, 4:36. Lobos 24–7. Drive: 5 plays, 4 yards, 2:03.

Fourth quarter

- SRS – Carlos Arreola 33-yard field goal, 3:32. Lobos 27–7. Drive: 10 plays, 35 yards, 3:46.

Statistics	WBU	SRS
First downs	8	23
Total yards	177	384
Rushing yards	-1	109
Passing yards	178	275
Turnovers	3	4
Time of possession	23:16	30:22

Team	Category	Player	Statistics
Wayland Baptist	Passing	Davian Guajardo	14/24, 158 yards, TD, 2 INT
Wayland Baptist	Rushing	Tyvavion Russel	8 rushes, 8 yards
Wayland Baptist	Receiving	Dayson Varela	3 receptions, 61 yards, TD
Sul Ross	Passing	Andrew Martinez	16/41, 275 yards, 2 TD, 4 INT
Sul Ross	Rushing	Rodd Hudson III	27 rushes, 103 yards
Sul Ross	Receiving	Isaiah Pena	10 receptions, 164 yards, TD

=== Texas Lutheran ===
Texas Lutheran Bulldogs at Sul Ross Lobos – Game summary

Quarter	1	2	3	4	Total
Bulldogs	0	7	3	24	34
Lobos	21	10	3	3	37

at Jackson Field, Alpine, Texas

- Date: September 30
- Game time: 6:00 p.m. CDT
- Game weather: Sunny, 82 °F (28 °C)
- Game attendance: 194
- Referee: Steve Hill
- Box score, Recap

Game information
First quarter
- SRS – Quincy Blair 55-yard interception return (Carlos Arreola kick), 9:32. Lobos 7–0.
- SRS – Rodd Hudson III 9-yard run (Carlos Arreola kick), 3:58. Lobos 14–0. Drive: 9 plays, 65 yards, 3:39.
- SRS – Isaiah Pena 27-yard pass from Andrew Martinez (Carlos Arreola kick), 1:32. Lobos 21–0. Drive: 3 plays, 37 yards, 0:52.

Second quarter

- TLU – Jacob Forton 3-yard run (Joaquin Rodriguez kick), 9:48. Lobos 21–7. Drive: 11 plays, 86 yards, 6:34.
- SRS – Carlos Arreola 39-yard field goal, 2:43. Lobos 24–7. Drive: 12 plays, 36 yards, 4:47.
- SRS – Vernon Hartfield Jr. 30-yard interception return (Carlos Arreola kick), 1:53. Lobos 31–7.

Third quarter

- TLU – Joaquin Rodriguez 33-yard field goal, 11:12. Lobos 31–10. Drive: 6 plays, 12 yards, 2:27.
- SRS – Carlos Arreola 38-yard field goal, 5:07. Lobos 34–10. Drive: 10 plays, 54 yards, 6:05.

Fourth quarter

- TLU – DaKory Williams 16-yard run (Seth Cosme pass to Jacob Wallace), 13:19. Lobos 34–18. Drive: 10 plays, 65 yards, 3:52.
- TLU – Caden Bosanko 5-yard run (Caden Bosanko pass to Cayleb Klostermann), 4:18. Lobos 34–26. Drive: 13 plays, 77 yards, 5:22.
- TLU – Joshua Muncrief 21-yard pass from Caden Bosanko (Caden Bosanko pass to Weston Guzman), 0:49. Tied 34–34. Drive: 7 plays, 83 yards, 1:30.
- SRS – Carlos Arreola 38-yard field goal, 0:00. Lobos 37–34. Drive: 6 plays, 49 yards, 0:49.

Statistics	TLU	SRS
First downs	24	18
Total yards	412	360
Rushing yards	242	196
Passing yards	170	164
Turnovers	4	1
Time of possession	31:59	28:01

Team	Category	Player	Statistics
Texas Lutheran	Passing	Seth Cosme	12/27, 149 yards, 4 INT
Texas Lutheran	Rushing	Jacob Forton	19 rushes, 84 yards, TD
Texas Lutheran	Receiving	DaKory Willis	4 receptions, 52 yards
Sul Ross	Passing	Andrew Martinez	14/23, 164 yards, TD, INT
Sul Ross	Rushing	Travell Lumpkin	9 rushes, 93 yards
Sul Ross	Receiving	Isaiah Pena	4 receptions, 62 yards, TD

The Lobos jumped out to a 34–10 lead in the third quarter but the Bulldogs would score 24 unanswered points to tie the game 34–34 with 0:49 left in regulation. On the final drive of the game, the Lobos would quickly go down the field with Carlos Arreola making the game-winning field goal as time expired.

=== At Austin ===
Sul Ross Lobos at Austin Kangaroos – Game summary

Quarter	1	2	3	4	Total
Lobos	7	21	7	14	49
Kangaroos	0	7	0	0	7

at Jerry E. Apple Stadium, Sherman, Texas

- Date: October 7
- Game time: 1:00 p.m. CDT
- Game attendance: 986
- Box score, Recap

Game information
First quarter
- SRS – Vicent Luevano 74-yard punt return (Carlos Arreoloa kick), 2:11. Lobos 7–0.

Second quarter

- SRS – Andrew Martinez 8-yard run (Carlos Arreola kick), 14:53. Lobos 14–0. Drive: 3 plays, 7 yards, 0:38.
- SRS – Rod Hudson III 1-yard run (Carlos Arreola kick), 4:40. Lobos 21–0. Drive: 8 plays, 39 yards, 4:13.
- AC – Grant Yudizky 27-yard pass from Jaylon Talton (John Aldridge kick), 3:12. Lobos 21–7. Drive: 4 plays, 40 yards, 1:19.
- SRS – Andrew Martinez 6-yard run (Carlos Arreola kick), 0:16. Lobos 28–7. Drive: 8 plays, 75 yards, 2:56.

Third quarter

- SRS – Ahmon Kendrick 18-yard pass from Andrew Martinez (Carlos Arreola kick), 9:00. Lobos 35–7. Drive: 13 plays, 65 yards, 5:57.

Fourth quarter

- SRS – Cyrin Myles 5-yard run (Carlos Arreola kick), 6:30. Lobos 42–7. Drive: 4 plays, 52 yards, 1:35.
- SRS – Chris Gisewhite 8-yard pass from Cyrin Myles (Carlos Arreola kick), 0:18. Lobos 49–7. Drive: 7 plays, 39 yards, 3:09.

Statistics	SRS	AC
First downs	23	9
Total yards	396	183
Rushing yards	186	61
Passing yards	210	122
Turnovers	1	3
Time of possession	33:04	26:56

Team	Category	Player	Statistics
Sul Ross	Passing	Andrew Martinez	12/19, 161 yards, TD
Sul Ross	Rushing	Andrew Martinez	11 rushes, 65 yards, 2 TD
Sul Ross	Receiving	Ahmon Kendrick	4 receptions, 86 yards, TD
Austin	Passing	Jaylon Talton	12/25, 122 yards, TD, INT
Austin	Rushing	Jaylon Talton	14 rushes, 30 yards
Austin	Receiving	Grant Yudizky	1 reception, 27 yards, TD

=== At Mary Hardin–Baylor ===
Sul Ross Lobos at Mary Hardin–Baylor Crusaders – Game summary

Quarter	1	2	3	4	Total
Lobos	7	6	0	0	13
Crusaders	9	7	7	14	37

at Crusader Stadium, Belton, Texas

- Date: October 14
- Game time: 1:00 p.m. CDT
- Game weather: Sunny
- Game attendance: 3,307
- Referee: Wayne Elliott
- Box score, Recap

Game information
First quarter
- CRU – Chris Ruiz tackled in end zone for a safety, 13:29. Crusaders 2–0.
- SRS – Isaiah Pena 27-yard pass from Myles Cyrin (Carlos Arreola kick), 6:42. Lobos 7–2. Drive: 10 plays, 70 yards, 5:20.
- CRU – Christopher Gacayan 10-yard pass from Isaac Phe (Jack Bruner kick), 3:40. Crusaders 9–7. Drive: 7 plays, 44 yards, 2:59.

Second quarter

- SRS – Carlos Arreola 24-yard field goal, 11:40. Lobos 10–9. Drive: 7 plays, 13 yards, 4:24.
- CRU – Romello Cook 22-yard pass from Isaac Phe (Jack Bruner kick), 8:35. Crusaders 16–10. Drive: 7 plays, 75 yards, 3:05.
- SRS – Carlos Arreola 40-yard field goal, 0:00. Crusaders 16–13. Drive: 12 plays, 53 yards, 2:56.

Third quarter

- CRU – Johnny Smith-Rider 41-yard interception return (Jack Bruner kick), 12:07. Crusaders 23–13.

Fourth quarter

- CRU – Solomon Hopkins 0-yard punt return (Jack Bruner kick), 12:38. Crusaders 30–13.
- CRU – Ozias Wright 20-yard run (Jack Bruner kick), 8:42. Crusaders 37–13. Drive: 3 plays, 62 yards, 0:44.

Statistics	SRS	CRU
First downs	18	16
Total yards	268	298
Rushing yards	144	146
Passing yards	124	152
Turnovers	1	1
Time of possession	34:39	25:21

Team	Category	Player	Statistics
Sul Ross	Passing	Cyrin Miles	14/26, 124 yards, TD, INT
Sul Ross	Rushing	Rodd Hudson III	22 rushes, 95 yards
Sul Ross	Receiving	Isaiah Pena	2 receptions, 32 yards, TD
Mary Hardin–Baylor	Passing	Isaac Phe	10/19, 152 yards, 2 TD
Mary Hardin–Baylor	Rushing	Ozias Wright	10 rushes, 67 yards, TD
Mary Hardin–Baylor	Receiving	Christopher Gacayan	4 receptions, 54 yards, TD

=== No. 19 Hardin–Simmons ===
No. 19 Hardin–Simmons Cowboys at Sul Ross Lobos – Game summary

Quarter	1	2	3	4	Total
No. 19 Cowboys	7	34	7	7	55
Lobos	0	0	0	7	7

at Jackson Field, Alpine, Texas

- Date: October 21
- Game time: 12:00 p.m. CDT
- Game weather: Cloudy, 81 °F (27 °C)
- Game attendance: 194
- Referee: Rolando Gonzalez
- Box score, Recap

Game information
First quarter
- HSU – Noah Garcia 54-yard run (Grayson Bearden kick), 13:52. Cowboys 7–0. Drive: 3 plays, 65 yards, 1:08.

Second quarter

- HSU – Colton Marshall 2-yard run (kick failed), 14:56. Cowboys 13–0. Drive: 6 plays, 55 yards, 2:09.
- HSU – Noah Garcia 15-yard run (Andy Prazak kick), 9:10. Cowboys 20–0. Drive: 7 plays, 98 yards, 2:57.
- HSU – K. J. Peoples 58-yard pass from Gaylon Glynn (Andy Prazak kick), 6:57. Cowboys 27–0. Drive: 2 plays, 55 yards, 0:47.
- HSU – Tailon Garrett 40-yard pass from Gaylon Glynn (Andy Prazak kick), 3:58. Cowboys 34–0. Drive: 4 plays, 72 yards, 1:27.
- HSU – Myles Featherstone 1-yard run (Andy Prazak kick), 0:31. Cowboys 41–0. Drive: 8 plays, 40 yards, 1:38.

Third quarter

- HSU – Dameon Gomes 68-yard punt return (Andy Prazak kick), 5:11. Cowboys 48–0.

Fourth quarter

- SRS – Rodd Hudson III 5-yard run (Carlos Arreola kick), 10:34. Cowboys 48–7. Drive: 9 plays, 70 yards, 4:26.
- HSU – Kevin Martin 9-yard run (Andy Prazak kick), 8:19. Cowboys 55–7. Drive: 6 plays, 47 yards, 2:15.

Statistics	HSU	SRS
First downs	20	19
Total yards	506	253
Rushing yards	282	134
Passing yards	224	119
Turnovers	1	4
Time of possession	29:13	30:47

Team	Category	Player	Statistics
Hardin–Simmons	Passing	Gaylon Glynn	11/22, 224 yards, 2 TD
Hardin–Simmons	Rushing	Colton Marshall	9 rushes, 90 yards
Hardin–Simmons	Receiving	K. J. Peoples	3 receptions, 81 yards, TD
Sul Ross	Passing	Andrew Martinez	9/16, 56 yards, INT
Sul Ross	Rushing	Travell Lumpkin	7 rushes, 45 yards
Sul Ross	Receiving	Vicente Luevano	2 receptions, 24 yards

=== At East Texas Baptist ===
Sul Ross Lobos at East Texas Baptist Tigers – Game summary

Quarter	1	2	3	4	Total
Lobos	3	0	7	0	10
Tigers	3	0	7	14	24

at Ornelas Stadium, Marshall, Texas

- Date: October 28
- Game time: 1:00 p.m. CDT
- Game weather: Sunny, 75 °F (24 °C)
- Game attendance: 1,276
- Referee: Kerry Moore
- Box score, Recap

Game information
First quarter
- ETX – Pedro Cavazos 25-yard field goal, 4:31. Tigers 3–0. Drive: 10 plays, 42 yards, 4:40.
- SRS – Carlos Arreola 20-yard field goal, 0:00. Tied 3–3. Drive: 9 plays, 54 yards, 4:24.

Second quarter

- No scoring plays

Third quarter

- ETX – Kylin Jackson 1-yard run (Pedro Cavazos kick), 4:48. Tigers 10–3. Drive: 2 plays, 1 yard, 0:52.
- SRS – Bobby Williams 98-yard kickoff return (Carlos Arreola kick), 4:35. Tied 10–10.

Fourth quarter

- ETX – Zay Thomas 22-yard pass from Carlos Garibay (Pedro Cavazos kick), 8:21. Tigers 17–10. Drive: 2 plays, 24 yards, 0:41.
- ETX – Carldell Beard 3-yard run (Pedro Cavazos kick), 1:34. Tigers 24–10. Drive: 1 play, 3 yards, 0:05.

Statistics	SRS	ETX
First downs	11	17
Total yards	211	271
Rushing yards	107	134
Passing yards	104	137
Turnovers	4	2
Time of possession	27:43	32:17

Team	Category	Player	Statistics
Sul Ross	Passing	Andrew Martinez	7/18, 74 yards, 2 INT
Sul Ross	Rushing	Andrew Martinez	19 rushes, 72 yards
Sul Ross	Receiving	Vicente Luevano	2 receptions, 32 yards
East Texas Baptist	Passing	Carlos Garibay	14/33, 137 yards, TD, INT
East Texas Baptist	Rushing	Paul Woodard	15 rushes, 75 yards
East Texas Baptist	Receiving	Zay Thomas	5 receptions, 55 yards, TD

=== Howard Payne ===
Howard Payne Yellow Jackets at Sul Ross Lobos – Game summary

Quarter	1	2	3	4	Total
Yellow Jackets	6	15	7	14	42
Lobos	7	14	10	16	47

at Jackson Field, Alpine, Texas

- Date: November 4
- Game time: 1:00 p.m. CDT
- Game weather: Sunny
- Game attendance: 269
- Referee: Esrael Silva
- Box score, Recap

Game information
First quarter
- HPU – Michael Fields 37-yard field goal, 7:55. Yellow Jackets 3–0. Drive: 11 plays, 40 yards, 4:00.
- SRS – Vicente Luevano 75-yard pass from Andrew Martinez (Carlos Arreola kick), 7:36. Lobos 7–3. Drive: 1 play, 75 yards, 0:14.
- HPU – Michael Fields 31-yard field goal, 3:22. Lobos 7–6. Drive: 13 plays, 61 yards, 4:14.

Second quarter

- SRS – Vicente Luevano 40-yard pass from Andrew Martinez (Carlos Arreola kick), 12:02. Lobos 14–6. Drive: 5 plays, 61 yards, 2:13.
- HPU – Blessing Ngene 4-yard run (Landon McKinney pass to Gus Charles), 8:48. Tied 14–14. Drive: 8 plays, 75 yards, 3:14.
- HPU – Jordan Carroll 53-yard pass from Landon McKinney (Michael Fields kick), 3:42. Yellow Jackets 21–14. Drive: 3 plays, 79 yards, 0:55.
- SRS – Alec Garcia 100-yard blocked field goal return (Carlos Arreola kick), 0:00. Tied 21–21.

Third quarter

- SRS – Vicente Luevano 8-yard pass from Andrew Martinez (Carlos Arreola kick), 14:17. Lobos 28–21. Drive: 2 plays, 10 yards, 0:42.
- HPU – Casey Dufner 11-yard pass from Landon McKinney (Michael Fields kick), 8:39. Tied 28–28. Drive: 9 plays, 72 yards, 4:15.
- SRS – Carlos Arreola 39-yard field goal, 2:35. Lobos 31–28. Drive: 12 plays, 49 yards, 5:59.

Fourth quarter

- SRS – Bobby Williams 41-yard pass from Andrew Martinez (Carlos Arreola kick), 14:18. Lobos 38–28. Drive: 5 plays, 66 yards, 2:32.
- HPU – Samuel Sims 15-yard pass from Landon McKinney (Michael Fields kick), 10:55. Lobos 38–35. Drive: 11 plays, 75 yards, 3:23.
- SRS – Carlos Arreola 33-yard field goal, 7:20. Lobos 41–35. Drive: 9 plays, 67 yards, 3:26.
- HPU – Jordan Carroll 5-yard pass from Landon McKinney (Michael Fields kick), 5:52. Yellow Jackets 42–41. Drive: 4 plays, 74 yards, 1:22.
- SRS – Travell Lumpkin 3-yard run (pass failed), 0:32. Lobos 47–42. Drive: 9 plays, 74 yards, 1:56.

Statistics	HPU	SRS
First downs	29	25
Total yards	552	550
Rushing yards	81	177
Passing yards	471	373
Turnovers	2	1
Time of possession	28:20	31:40

Team	Category	Player	Statistics
Howard Payne	Passing	Landon McKinney	34/56, 471 yards, 4 TD
Howard Payne	Rushing	Blessing Ngene	12 rushes, 55 yards, TD
Howard Payne	Receiving	Gus Charles	7 receptions, 119 yards
Sul Ross	Passing	Andrew Martinez	23/42, 339 yards, 4 TD
Sul Ross	Rushing	Andrew Martinez	14 rushes, 63 yards
Sul Ross	Receiving	Vicente Luevano	7 receptions, 165 yards, 3 TD

=== At McMurry ===
Sul Ross Lobos at McMurry War Hawks – Game summary

Quarter	1	2	3	4	Total
Lobos	3	6	7	7	23
War Hawks	14	10	13	0	37

at Wilford Moore Stadium, Abilene, Texas

- Date: November 11
- Game time: 1:00 p.m. CST
- Game weather: Sunny
- Game attendance: 100
- Referee: Rex Rose
- Box score, Recap

Game information
First quarter
- SRS – Carlos Arreola 19-yard field goal, 12:32. Lobos 3–0. Drive: 9 plays, 69 yards, 2:28.
- MCM – Jess Hoel 2-yard run (Jared Mendoza kick), 9:08. War Hawks 7–3. Drive: 3 plays, 75 yards, 3:24.
- MCM – Karmelus Card 14-yard pass from Jess Hoel (Jared Mendoza kick), 6:06. War Hawks 14–3. Drive: 1 play, 14 yards, 0:09.

Second quarter

- SRS – Carols Arreola 22-yard field goal, 14:54. War Hawks 14–6. Drive: 7 plays, 24 yards, 3:41.
- MCM – Corinthean Coleman 75-yard pass from Jess Hoel (Jared Mendoza kick), 10:54. War Hawks 21–6. Drive: 3 plays, 84 yards, 1:20.
- MCM – Jared Mendoza 25-yard field goal, 5:50. War Hawks 24–6. Drive: 6 plays, 30 yards, 3:18.
- SRS – Carlos Arreola 20-yard field goal, 1:00. War Hawks 24–9. Drive: 11 plays, 87 yards, 4:44.

Third quarter

- MCM – Kristopher Martin 32-yard pass from Jess Hoel (Jared Mendoza kick), 8:06. War Hawks 31–9. Drive: 8 plays, 70 yards, 3:59.
- MCM – Jess Hoel 2-yard run (kick blocked), 5:38. War Hawks 37–9. Drive: 2 plays, 1 yard, 0:28.
- SRS – Vicente Luevano 10-yard pass from Cyrin Myles (Carlos Arreola kick), 1:04. War Hawks 37–16. Drive: 5 plays, 87 yards, 1:51.

Fourth quarter

- SRS – Bobby Williams 2-yard pass from Cyrin Myles (Carlos Arreola kick), 8:22. War Hawks 37–23. Drive: 11 plays, 94 yards, 4:36.

Statistics	SRS	MCM
First downs	27	16
Total yards	432	354
Rushing yards	46	15
Passing yards	386	339
Turnovers	4	1
Time of possession	32:29	27:31

Team	Category	Player	Statistics
Sul Ross	Passing	Cyrin Myles	23/36, 242 yards, 2 TD, 2 INT
Sul Ross	Rushing	Travell Lumpkin	7 rushes, 25 yards
Sul Ross	Receiving	Isaiah Pena	3 receptions, 99 yards
McMurry	Passing	Jess Hoel	21/28, 339 yards, 3 TD, INT
McMurry	Rushing	Corinthean Coleman	1 rush, 13 yards
McMurry	Receiving	Corinthean Coleman	1 reception, 75 yards, TD

== Roster ==
2023 Sul Ross Lobos football team roster
Players
Coaches
Offense

Pos.	#	Name	Class
RB	3	Travell Lumpkin	Sr
RB	4	Rodd Hudson III	Jr
WR	5	Ahmonte Kendrick	So
WR	6	Vicente Luevano	Jr
QB	11	Andrew Martinez	So
WR	12	Kawaski Latham (S)	So
QB	15	Cael Stewart	So
WR	16	Tarius McClure	Fr
QB	17	Nicolas Lee	Fr
QB	18	Cyrin Miles	Fr
QB	19	River Medlin	Fr
WR	22	Bobby Williams	Fr
RB	28	Lueranze Johnson	Fr
WR	31	Sebastian Cortez	Fr
RB	38	Elijah Uribe	So
RB	43	Dijon James	So
TE	44	Maurice Taylor	Jr
WR	45	Mathew Black	Fr
RB	46	Hayden Mullins	So
OL	60	Maximiliano Alvardao	Jr
OL	62	Seth Richardson	Fr
OL	63	Cash Bailey	Fr
OL	64	Xavier Garcia	Jr
OL	65	Max Matejcek	Fr
LG	66	Adam Lugo	Fr
OT, G	67	Trayvon Young	Fr
RG	68	James Cadena	Fr
OL	69	Joshua Munoz	Sr
OL	70	Jonathan Escobar	Fr
OL	72	Noah Yassine	Fr
RT	73	Kevin Avila	Fr
OL	74	Andre Brady	Fr
OL	75	Clayton White	Fr
OL	76	Jeremiah Hayes	Fr
OL	77	Zephaniah Amosa	Fr
RG	78	Jacob Morales	So
C	79	Drew Coker	Fr
WR	80	Isaiah Pena	So
WR	82	Landen Drake	Fr
WR	83	Ethan Sanchez	So
TE	84	Jermaine Bernal	So
WR	85	Jackson Carroll	So
TE	86	Aleksander Saenz Nores	Fr
WR	87	Jeremiah Rodriguez	Fr
TE	89	Justin Moon	So
RB		Alan Alfaro	Sr
OL		Jacob Alston	Fr
OL		Tino Alvarado	Fr
OL		Jayden Baladez	Fr
RB, WR		Elijah Bell	Fr
WR		Dominic Castellanos	Fr
TE		Micah Collins	So
QB		J. P. Cortez	Fr
WR		Korbin Covarrubiaz	So
WR		Adrian Estrada	Fr
WR		Elijah Gonzalez	So
QB		Kai Hooten	Fr
WR		Jaylin Kibble	So
WR		Kameron Kirkwood	Fr
RB		Matthew Lopez	Fr
WR		Devonte McDonald	So
RG		Andrew Narro	Fr
WR		Erik Navarro	Fr
RB		Alejandro Navejar	Fr
WR		Wyatt Nelson	So
WR		Chris Palomo	Jr
WR		Zae Parker	Fr
WR		Braedon Robles	So
OL		Noel Ruiz	Fr
WR		Xavier Sanchez	Fr
QB		Joaquin Sandoval	So
QB		Tray Toliver	Fr
OL		Julian Venegas	Fr

Defense

Pos.	#	Name	Class
MLB	1	Jade Rios	Sr
S	2	Quincy Blair	Jr
LB	7	Javeon Moses	Sr
S	8	Kendrick Allen	Fr
DB	10	Brendon Martin	So
CB	12	Vernon Hartfiled Jr.	So
DB	13	Alec Garcia	So
DB	20	Maxwell Cotton	Fr
CB	24	Elijah Gomez	Sr
DB	25	Dillon Grant	Fr
DB	27	Jakolby King	So
DB	29	Evian Thompson	So
LB	30	Mario Serrano	Fr
DB	33	Humberto Moreno	So
MLB	35	Darrion Brown	Jr
LB	36	Ashton Stoker	So
OLB	37	Daxavier Jones	Fr
OLB	39	Jaylen Parkinson	Fr
OLB	40	Aron Olague	So
OLB	41	Lorenzo Fowler	Sr
LB	42	Taylor Bennett	Fr
DL	44	Maurice Taylor	Jr
MLB	49	Nathan Castillo	So
LB	50	Jordan Rodriguez	Fr
OLB	51	Sean Street	So
LB	52	Logan Dewald	Fr
LB	53	Jaxon Lawdermilk	Fr
DE	54	Jayden Floyd	Jr
DE	55	Cooper Dockens	Fr
LB	56	Humberto Garcia	So
DE	57	Dylan Ivey	Fr
LB	58	Travis Owen	Sr
DT	59	Dalan Hunter	Fr
DL	61	Dominique Fierro	So
NG	71	Marcellus Wright	So
DL	90	Dayln Dunbar	Sr
DE	91	Alex Garcia	So
DL	92	Ta'bias Jackson	So
DL	93	Desmond Hill	Fr
DE	94	Willie Johnson	Jr
DL	97	Roman Salcido	So
DT	99	Jacob Johnson	Fr
DL		Tino Alvarado	Fr
DB		Isaiah Brock	Fr
DB		Dominic Castellanos	Fr
DB		Joseph Cepeda	So
DB		Michael Coleman	Fr
OLB		Kenneth Erwin	Fr
DB		Jerimiah Griffin	Fr
DB		Antonio Henderson Jr.	Fr
LB, DE		Randy Ilunga	Fr
DB		Keyvien Johnson	Jr
OLB		Matthew Lopez	Fr
LB		Gage Luellen	Fr
LB		Izayiah Mackey	Fr
DB		Logan McCarver	Fr
DB		Nicholas Mendoza	So
DB		Xavier Minjarez	Sr
LB		Anthony Morales	Fr
LB		Alejandro Navejar	Fr
LB		Kisean Parker	Fr
LB		Anthony Pena	Fr
DB		Makhi Shannon	Fr
LB		Tyshawn Thomas	So
DB		Leroy Turner	Fr
DB		Esaui Uribe	Fr
DB		Derrick White	Fr

Special teams

Pos.	#	Name	Class
LS	20	Maxwell Cotton	Fr
P	34	Chris Ruiz	So
K	47	Carlos Arreola	Fr
K		Randy Ilunga	Fr

Head coach

- Barry Derickson

Coordinators/assistant coaches

- Christian Escobar
  Offensive coordinator
- Cadron Davis
  Assistant head coach/Defensive coordinator
- Eric Daniels
  Defensive run game/Linebackers
- Jeremy Aquino
  Special teams coordinator/Defensive line
- Fowler Freund
  Slot wide receivers/Specialists
- Billy Jack Ray
  Offensive line
- Kurt Harmening
  Chief of staff/Scouting and recruiting
- Isaiah Bravo
  Quarterbacks
- Ricardo Salinas
  Offensive line
- Andy Rivera
  Offensive line
- Klarissa Ortiz
  Outside linebackers

Legend

- (C) Team captain
- (S) Suspended
- (I) Ineligible
- Injured
- Redshirt

Roster
Last update: February 22, 2024
