= 2024 McMurry War Hawks football team =

American college football season

2024 McMurry War Hawks football
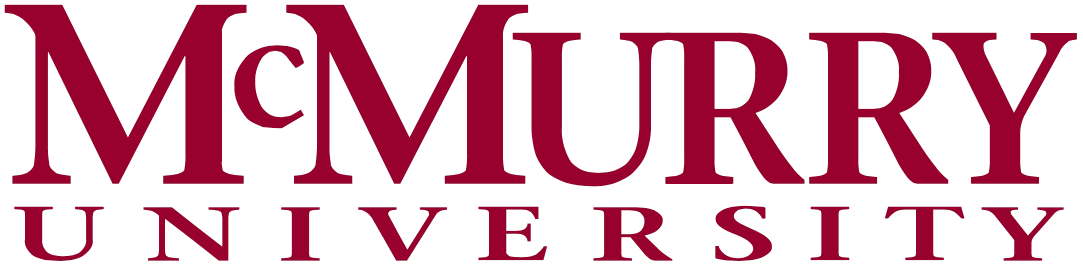

SCAC co-champion
- Conference: Southern Collegiate Athletic Conference
- Record: 7–3 (7–1 SCAC)
- Head coach: Jordan Neal (6th season)
- Co-offensive coordinators: Mark Rau (1st season); Matt Newby (1st season)
- Offensive scheme: Spread
- Defensive coordinator: Will Snyder (3rd season)
- Base defense: 3–4
- Home stadium: Wilford Moore Stadium

2024 Southern Collegiate Athletic Conference football standings
	Conf.			Overall
Team	W		L	W		L
Texas Lutheran +^	7	–	1	9	–	2
McMurry +	7	–	1	7	–	3
Centenary	4	–	4	4	–	6
Austin	2	–	6	2	–	8
Lyon	0	–	8	1	–	9
+ – Conference co-champions; ^ – NCAA Division III playoff participant

The 2024 McMurry War Hawks football team represented McMurry University in the 2024 NCAA Division III football season as a member of the Southern Collegiate Athletic Conference (SCAC). Led by sixth-year head coach Jordan Neal, the War Hawks finished with an overall record of 7–3 with a SCAC record of 7–1, finishing tied for 1st in the conference. The team played its home games at Wilford Moore Stadium in Abilene, Texas.

Quarterback Jess Hoel was named the SCAC's co-offensive player of the year and defensive lineman Kane Strohman was named co-defensive player of the year.

== Schedule ==
Date	Time	Opponent	Site	Result	Attendance
September 7	7:00 p.m.	at Southwestern (TX)*	Birkelbach Field; Georgetown, TX	L 20–24	4,000
September 14	6:00 p.m.	Lyon	Wilford Moore Stadium; Abilene, TX	W 48–6	1,542
September 21	6:00 p.m.	Texas Lutheran	Wilford Moore Stadium; Abilene, TX	W 31–10	1,614
September 28	1:00 p.m.	at Austin	Apple Stadium; Sherman, TX	W 34–9	N/A
October 12	5:00 p.m.	at Centenary	Atkins Field; Shreveport, LA	W 28–10	1,291
October 19	6:00 p.m.	No. 5 Hardin–Simmons*	Wilford Moore Stadium; Abilene, TX (Crosstown Showdown)	L 12–17	4,400
October 26	4:00 p.m.	at Texas Lutheran	Bulldog Stadium; Seguin, TX	L 6–28	1,500
November 2	1:00 p.m.	Austin^{†}	Wilford Moore Stadium; Abilene, TX	W 31–3	2,100
November 9	2:00 p.m.	at Lyon	Pioneer Stadium; Batesville, AR	W 28–0	350
November 16	12:00 p.m.	Centenary	Wilford Moore Stadium; Abilene, TX	W 49–12	2,000
*Non-conference game; ^{†}Homecoming; Rankings from D3Football.com Poll released prior to the game; All times are in Central time

== SCAC preseason media poll ==
The SCAC preseason media poll was released on August 19, 2024. The War Hawks were predicted to finish first in the conference.

== Game summaries ==
=== At Southwestern (TX) ===
	1	2	3	4	Total
War Hawks	7	6	0	7	20
Pirates	3	14	0	7	24

Statistics	MCM	SWU
First downs	18	20
Total yards	336	432
Rushing yards	50	99
Passing yards	286	333
Turnovers	2	3
Time of possession	21:37	38:23

Team	Category	Player	Statistics
McMurry	Passing	Jess Hoel	26/37, 286 yards, 3 TD
McMurry	Rushing	Jack Ishmael	6 rushes, 29 yards
McMurry	Receiving	Kason O'Shields	5 receptions, 148 yards, 2 TD
Southwestern	Passing	Jaylen Spriggs	24/37, 263 yards, 2 INT
Southwestern	Rushing	Leroy Rodriguez	11 rushes, 53 yards
Southwestern	Receiving	Aiden Huerta	5 receptions, 123 yards, TD

=== Lyon ===
	1	2	3	4	Total
Scots	6	0	0	0	6
War Hawks	8	17	17	6	48

Statistics	LC	MCM
First downs	16	20
Total yards	217	387
Rushing yards	85	43
Passing yards	132	344
Turnovers	3	0
Time of possession	32:24	27:36

Team	Category	Player	Statistics
Lyon	Passing	Joe Galay	4/5, 48 yards, INT
Lyon	Rushing	Jaylin Babers	17 rushes, 60 yards
Lyon	Receiving	Reginald Brown II	5 receptions, 40 yards
McMurry	Passing	Jess Hoel	18/27, 283 yards, 3 TD
McMurry	Rushing	Jess Hoel	13 rushes, 26 yards
McMurry	Receiving	Kristopher Martin	4 receptions, 114 yards

=== Texas Lutheran ===
	1	2	3	4	Total
Bulldogs	0	3	0	7	10
War Hawks	10	14	0	7	31

Statistics	TLU	MCM
First downs	13	18
Total yards	271	338
Rushing yards	104	131
Passing yards	167	207
Turnovers	4	0
Time of possession	24:21	35:39

Team	Category	Player	Statistics
Texas Lutheran	Passing	Caden Bosanko	12/30, 145 yards, INT
Texas Lutheran	Rushing	Caden Bosanko	13 rushes, 59 yards
Texas Lutheran	Receiving	Caleb Camarillo	3 receptions, 44 yards
McMurry	Passing	Jess Hoel	18/27, 202 yards, 3 TD
McMurry	Rushing	Jack Ishmael	14 rushes, 64 yards
McMurry	Receiving	Thomas Chandler	5 receptions, 76 yards, TD

=== At Austin ===
	1	2	3	4	Total
War Hawks	8	3	9	14	34
Kangaroos	0	9	0	0	9

Statistics	MCM	AC
First downs	22	12
Total yards	360	133
Rushing yards	91	104
Passing yards	269	29
Turnovers	2	3
Time of possession	31:23	28:37

Team	Category	Player	Statistics
McMurry	Passing	Jess Hoel	21/30, 269 yards, 2 TD, INT
McMurry	Rushing	Jess Hoel	11 rushes, 65 yards, 2 TD
McMurry	Receiving	Kristopher Martin	5 receptions, 101 yards
Austin	Passing	Jaylon Talton	5/15, 28 yards, 2 INT
Austin	Rushing	Barrett Hudson	18 rushes, 62 yards
Austin	Receiving	Michael Cress	3 receptions, 25 yards

=== At Centenary ===
	1	2	3	4	Total
War Hawks	6	8	14	0	28
Gentlemen	3	0	0	7	10

Statistics	MCM	CEN
First downs	15	11
Total yards	351	197
Rushing yards	100	-8
Passing yards	251	205
Turnovers	4	3
Time of possession	29:21	30:39

Team	Category	Player	Statistics
McMurry	Passing	Jess Hoel	18/32, 251 yards, TD, 3 INT
McMurry	Rushing	Drew Hagler	11 rushes, 40 yards, TD
McMurry	Receiving	Kristopher Martin	6 receptions, 146 yards, TD
Centenary	Passing	Zin'Tavious Smith	13/24, 137 yards, 2 INT
Centenary	Rushing	Obadiah Butler	6 rushes, 32 yards
Centenary	Receiving	Devin Ardoin	5 receptions, 74 yards, TD

=== No. 5 Hardin–Simmons ===
	1	2	3	4	Total
No. 5 Cowboys	7	0	3	7	17
War Hawks	0	6	0	6	12

Statistics	HSU	MCM
First downs	14	16
Total yards	244	232
Rushing yards	106	100
Passing yards	138	132
Turnovers	2	1
Time of possession	25:58	34:02

Team	Category	Player	Statistics
Hardin–Simmons	Passing	Kyle Brown	10/22, 138 yards, 2 TD
Hardin–Simmons	Rushing	Noah Garcia	13 rushes, 74 yards
Hardin–Simmons	Receiving	Tailon Garrett	3 receptions, 45 yards
McMurry	Passing	Jess Hoel	15/21, 132 yards, TD
McMurry	Rushing	Drew Hagler	21 rushes, 64 yards
McMurry	Receiving	Kason O'Shields	3 receptions, 59 yards, TD

=== At Texas Lutheran ===
	1	2	3	4	Total
War Hawks	3	0	0	3	6
Bulldogs	0	14	14	0	28

Statistics	MCM	TLU
First downs	20	14
Total yards	396	338
Rushing yards	74	119
Passing yards	322	219
Turnovers	1	2
Time of possession	35:06	24:54

Team	Category	Player	Statistics
McMurry	Passing	Jess Hoel	24/41, 290 yards, INT
McMurry	Rushing	Jack Ishmael	15 rushes, 50 yards
McMurry	Receiving	Kristopher Martin	5 receptions, 138 yards
Texas Lutheran	Passing	Caden Bosanko	9/17, 219 yards, TD
Texas Lutheran	Rushing	Caden Bosanko	14 rushes, 53 yards
Texas Lutheran	Receiving	Caleb Camarillo	2 receptions, 77 yards, TD

=== Austin ===
	1	2	3	4	Total
Kangaroos	3	0	0	0	3
War Hawks	7	14	3	7	31

Statistics	AC	MCM
First downs	16	25
Total yards	249	471
Rushing yards	106	142
Passing yards	143	329
Turnovers	0	1
Time of possession	28:20	31:40

Team	Category	Player	Statistics
Austin	Passing	Jaylon Talton	13/28, 128 yards
Austin	Rushing	Barrett Hudson	18 rushes, 50 yards
Austin	Receiving	Michael Cress	3 receptions, 39 yards
McMurry	Passing	Jess Hoel	28/42, 246 yards, TD, INT
McMurry	Rushing	Jess Hoel	7 rushes, 48 yards, 2 TD
McMurry	Receiving	Landon Holley	2 receptions, 83 yards, TD

=== At Lyon ===
	1	2	3	4	Total
War Hawks	14	7	0	7	28
Scots	0	0	0	0	0

Statistics	MCM	LC
First downs	28	5
Total yards	495	147
Rushing yards	236	107
Passing yards	259	40
Turnovers	1	2
Time of possession	40:36	19:24

Team	Category	Player	Statistics
McMurry	Passing	Jess Hoel	15/23, 198 yards, TD, INT
McMurry	Rushing	Jess Hoel	14 rushes, 111 yards, 2 TD
McMurry	Receiving	Kristopher Martin	6 receptions, 90 yards, TD
Lyon	Passing	Bryton Usrey	4/11, 26 yards, INT
Lyon	Rushing	Jaylin Babers	21 rushes, 149 yards
Lyon	Receiving	Cedric Allen	1 reception, 11 yards

=== Centenary ===
	1	2	3	4	Total
Gentlemen	0	6	6	0	12
War Hawks	7	16	26	0	49

Statistics	CEN	MCM
First downs	11	20
Total yards	117	492
Rushing yards	14	138
Passing yards	103	354
Turnovers	3	2
Time of possession	29:43	30:17

Team	Category	Player	Statistics
Centenary	Passing	Zin'Tavious Smith	13/20, 62 yards, TD
Centenary	Rushing	Bobby Shanklin Jr.	13 rushes, 31 yards
Centenary	Receiving	Jay Richardson	6 receptions, 47 yards
McMurry	Passing	Jess Hoel	15/23, 287 yards, 4 TD
McMurry	Rushing	Jess Hoel	14 rushes, 91 yards, 2 TD
McMurry	Receiving	Kristopher Martin	13 receptions, 212 yards, 4 TD
