= Buddy Fornes =

American football player and coach (1931–1983)

Biographical details
- Born: March 23, 1931
- Died: January 25, 1983 (aged 51); Stephenville, Texas, U.S.

Playing career
- 1953–1956: McMurry

Coaching career (HC unless noted)
- 1957–1960: Seminole HS (TX) (assistant)
- 1961–1965: McMurry (assistant)
- 1966–1972: McMurry
- 1973–1982: Tarleton State

Head coaching record
- Overall: 66–101–2
- Tournaments: 0–1 (NAIA D-II playoffs)

Accomplishments and honors

Championships
- 2 TIAA (1977–1978)

Awards
- LSC Coach of the Year (1968)

Charles "Buddy" Fornes (March 23, 1931 – January 25, 1983) was an American football player and coach. He served as the head football coach at his alma mater, McMurry University in Abilene, Texas, from 1966 to 1972 and Tarleton State University in Stephenville, Texas from 1973 to 1982, compiling a career college football coaching record of 66–101–2.

Fornes was found by his wife dead from a shotgun wound to his chest, on January 25, 1983, at his home in Stephenville, Texas. His death was ruled a suicide.

== Head coaching record ==
Year	Team	Overall	Conference	Standing	Bowl/playoffs
McMurry Indians (Lone Star Conference) (1966–1972)
1966	McMurry	1–8–1	0–6–1	8th	
1967	McMurry	6–4	4–3	T–3rd	
1968	McMurry	8–2	5–2	3rd	
1969	McMurry	2–8	1–6	8th	
1970	McMurry	5–6	4–5	T–5th	
1971	McMurry	2–8	2–7	T–8th	
1972	McMurry	3–6	NA	NA	
McMurry:		27–42–1	16–30		
Tarleton State Texans (Lone Star Conference) (1973–1975)
1973	Tarleton State	1–9	1–8	10th	
1974	Tarleton State	1–10	0–9	10th	
1975	Tarleton State	1–10	1–8	T–8th	
Tarleton State Texans (Texas Intercollegiate Athletic Association) (1976–1982)
1976	Tarleton State	2–7	1–3	T–3rd	
1977	Tarleton State	7–3	4–0	1st	
1978	Tarleton State	8–1–1	7–0–1	1st	L NAIA Division II Quarterfinal
1979	Tarleton State	6–4	4–4	3rd	
1980	Tarleton State	3–7	3–7	5th	
1981	Tarleton State	6–4	6–4	3rd	
1982	Tarleton State	4–4	4–4	3rd	
Tarleton State:		39–59–1	31–47–1		
Total:		66–101–2			
National championship Conference title Conference division title or championship game berth
