= Centenary Gentlemen football =

Football team

2024 Centenary Gentlemen football team
- First season: 1894; 132 years ago (Note: The program was discontinued after the 1947 season. It was relaunched in the 2024 season; 2 years ago.)
- Athletic director: David Orr
- Head coach: Byron Dawson; 2nd season, 4–6 (.400)
- Location: Shreveport, Louisiana
- Stadium: Mayo Field (capacity: 2000)
- NCAA division: Division III
- Conference: SCAC
- Colors: Maroon and white
- All-time record: 140–95–20 (.588)
- Bowl record: 0–0–1 (.500)

Conference championships
- 1 LIAA (1923); 2 SIAA (1926–1927)
- Website: gocentenary.com/football

The Centenary Gentlemen football team represents the Centenary College of Louisiana in college football at the NCAA Division III level. The Gentlemen are members of the Southern Collegiate Athletic Conference (SCAC) since 2024. The Gentlemen play their home games at Mayo Field in Shreveport, Louisiana.

The team's head coach is Byron Dawson and he assumed the role during their 2023 exhibition season.

== History ==
The school assembled several makeshift teams for the 1894, 1895, and 1896 seasons. However, in 1898, the Board of Trustees prohibited participation in intercollegiate athletics. The ban was implemented following significant losses to Louisiana State University in football, which led to the hospitalization of two Centenary players. In 1901, the ban was relaxed, permitting the college to form a baseball team. Full participation in intercollegiate athletics was restored when the school relocated to Shreveport in 1908 The 1927 team, coached by Homer H. Norton, is considered one of the school's best teams in its history, achieving an undefeated 10–0 record that season.

From 1927 through 1936, the team compiled a record of 73–22–11, including two undefeated seasons (1927 & 1932). The 1927 team featured wins over four powers in the Southwest Conference: Southern Methodist, Baylor, Rice, and Texas Christian. The 1932 team featured wins over Louisiana State, Texas, Texas A&M, and Mississippi.

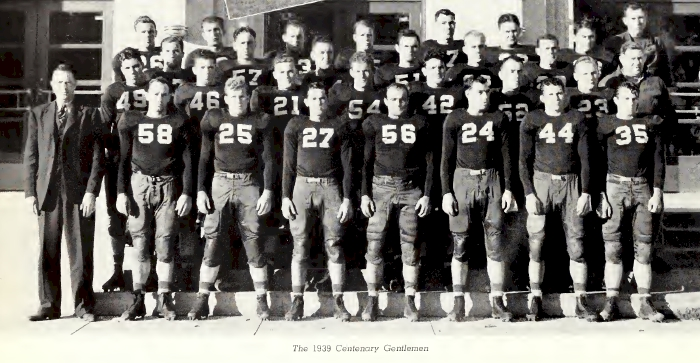
The 1939 football team

Head Coach Homer Norton left Centenary after the 1933 season, and success and fan interest dwindled. After an 0–8–2 season in 1941, the team was discontinued for the duration of World War II due to budget deficits. Football resumed in 1947, but after winning only one game during the season, the football program was halted for good in December 1947. The program was discontinued during World War II due to budget deficits and declining fan interest. An effort to revive the team in 1947 was unsuccessful, A later attempt to reinstate the football program in the 1960s was also unsuccessful.

On November 10, 2021, Centenary College announced the return of its football program. On March 30, 2022, a historic decision was made with the appointment of Shreveport native Byron Dawson, a former Evangel and LSU standout, as the Gents' new head coach. Dawson became the first African-American head football coach in the school's history. The team began exhibition play in 2023 and officially started NCAA competition in 2024.
