= Lubbock High School =

- Lubbock High Logo

Location
- 2004 19th St. Lubbock, Texas 79401; United States; 33°34′41″N 101°51′35″W

Information
- Type: Public magnet
- Motto: Sportsmanship, then Victory
- Established: 1891
- School district: Lubbock Independent School District
- NCES District ID: 4828500
- CEEB code: 444360
- NCES School ID: 482850010891
- Principal: Douglas Young
- Staff: 113.90 (FTE)
- Grades: 9-12
- Student to teacher ratio: 16.62
- Campus size: 5.5 acres (2.2 ha)
- Campus type: Urban
- Colors: Black and gold
- Slogan: "Once a Westerner, Always a Westerner." "The School of WWAM: Where Westerners Achieve More!"
- Athletics: Yes
- Athletics conference: 5A
- Mascot: Westerner
- Affiliation: International Baccalaureate Organization (IBO), Advanced Placement Capstone Diploma Program (AP Capstone), Advanced Placement (AP)
- Information: (806) 219-1600
- Website: lubbockisd.org/o/lhs
- Lubbock High School
- U.S. National Register of Historic Places
- Recorded Texas Historic Landmark
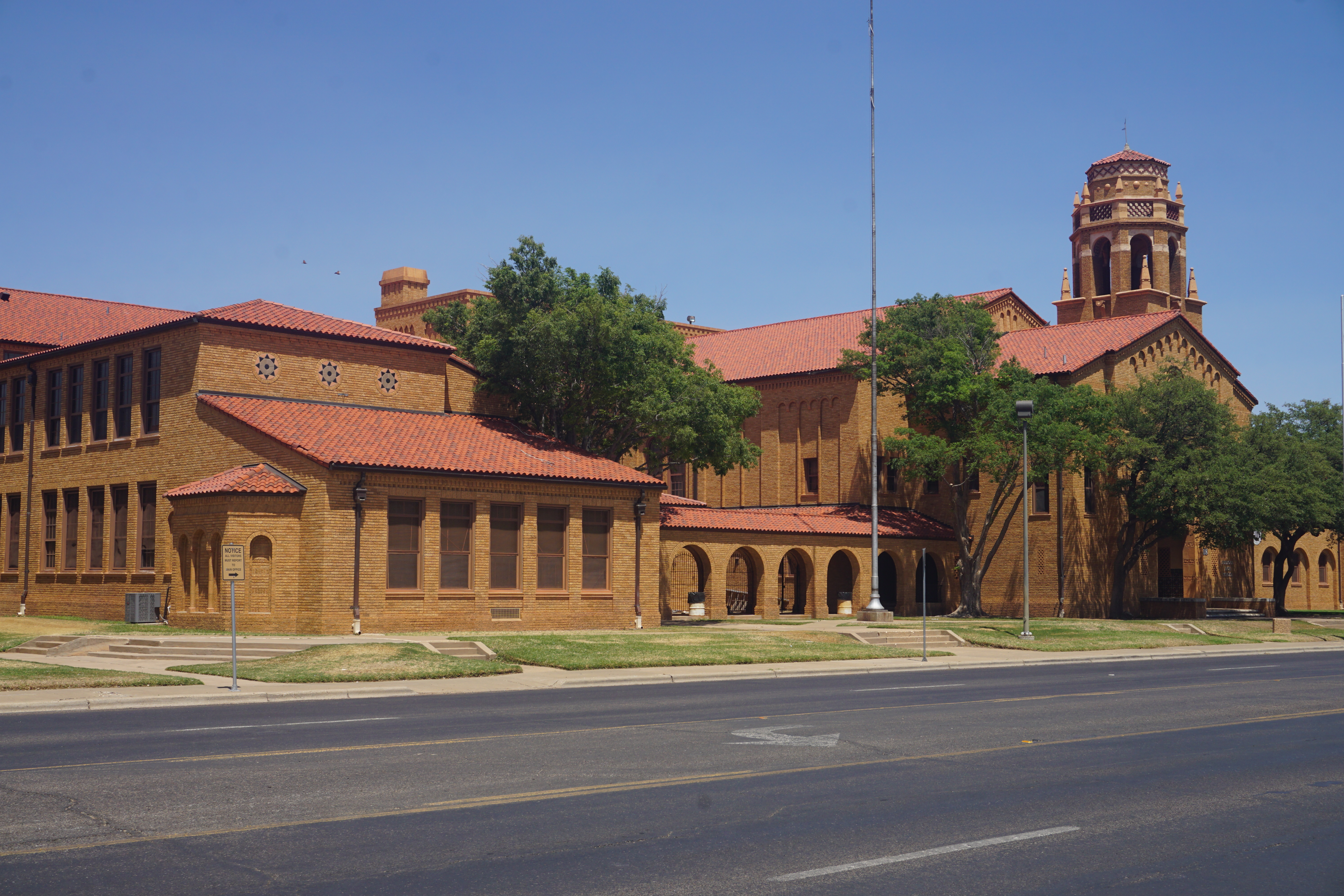
- Front of Lubbock High School

- Location within Texas Location within the United States
- Built: 1930
- Architect: Peters, Strange & Bradshaw; Haynes & Kirby
- Architectural style: N. Ital. Romanesque Revival
- NRHP reference No.: 85000924
- RTHL No.: 3144

Significant dates
- Added to NRHP: May 1, 1985
- Designated RTHL: 1984

Lubbock High School is a 5A high school serving grades nine to twelve in Lubbock, Texas, as part of the Lubbock Independent School District.

The school was founded in 1891 as the first high school in Lubbock County. Lubbock High School predates the incorporation of Lubbock, Texas by 18 years. Lubbock High's colors are black and gold, and its mascot is the Westerner. The school primarily serves students from the central and eastern parts of Lubbock, but the school's LEAP (Lubbock Exemplary Academic Program) magnet program serves students from all over the city.

== History ==
The school was founded in 1891 as a one-room school, with two additional rooms added in 1898. The original announcement of the school's opening read: "Schooling for all who could reach it by pony, wagon, buggy or on foot." The first (and only) teacher at this point was Miss Minnie Tubbs. In March 1909, a fire set by students destroyed the building. After this, the school relocated to a brick building with two stories and a basement at the location of the current City Hall in Lubbock. In 1922, a bond issue provided for a new high school with 28 teachers and was located between 13th and 14th streets in the 2000 block. Bonds were voted in 1925 for the addition of two study halls. This was the old Thompson Junior High building. In the fall of 1929, plans began for the construction of a new building for LHS. Construction began in 1930, and the building was completed in 1931. The school opened in its new location for the fall semester of 1931. This is the current Lubbock High School building. Due to its distinctive architecture, the school is included in the National Register of Historic Places.

== Academics ==
In 1979, due to low enrollment as a result of new school district boundaries, there was discussion of closing LHS. To solve this problem and to comply with an ongoing desegregation plan ordered by the US Department of Justice, LEAP (Lubbock Exemplary Academic Program) was developed. This college preparatory program offers advanced classes in mathematics, science, English, and history. Counselor Nancy Phillips was instrumental in the initial success of the LEAP Program. In its initial design, the LEAP plan included several incentives to attract students from outside the school's geographic district. These included unique classes not offered at that time in other Lubbock high schools, including Russian, Portuguese, Mandarin Chinese, Western Cultures, Marine Biology, and Calculus, among others. Additionally, the school offered trips to relevant locations in conjunction with specific classes. For example, students in the Western Cultures class spent 15 days in western Europe at the close of the school year. Due to pressure from parents with students in other high schools in the district, some of these incentives were phased out by the school board in the 1983–1984 academic year.

1983 saw the addition of the "Friday Enrichment Schedule," wherein students attended academic classes Monday through Thursday (for longer hours than other high schools in Lubbock) and attended either "enriching classes" (e.g. "Reading for Pleasure," "French Club," etc.) or review classes from 8 am until noon on Fridays. The Friday Enrichment Schedule was altered to exclude the "enriching classes" in favor of shortened academic classes in 2007. The school switched to an "abbreviated" Texas Friday schedule with classes ending at 1:35 on Fridays. This schedule was changed in 2017 to ending at the regular time of 3:55, then changed again in 2021 with classes ending at 4:10. Starting in the 2022-2023 school year, classes began to be shortened on Wednesdays with first classes starting at 9 am; other days retain normal schedules. Along with the "Friday Enrichment Schedule," a program was instituted in 1983 that allowed junior or senior students to take courses at Texas Tech University or South Plains College for dual credit.

In 1996, Lubbock High was named as a Blue Ribbon school.

Lubbock High School began its International Baccalaureate classes during the 2000–2001 school year.

Lubbock High School implemented the AP Capstone Diploma Program in 2018.

== Extracurricular activities ==
=== Academic Decathlon ===
In 2002, the Lubbock High Academic Decathlon team made national news when its victory over J. Frank Dobie High School in the state championship competition was disputed in court. The debate arose when there were questions about the scoring methods used in some of the competition's events. Both Dobie and LHS prepared for national competition in Phoenix, Arizona as the lawsuit developed. The Court ruled Lubbock High the rightful victor, and the team did not hear of this news until they were en route to Phoenix. At nationals, Lubbock High went on to place 3rd in the national competition, as well as 1st place among "rookie" schools in the competition. In later years, Lubbock High made history again when an LHS decathlete became the first competitor to achieve the highest score in the state without competing in the highest division. In 2006, the Lubbock High School Academic Decathlon team placed third in the state. In 2013, the Lubbock High School decathlon team placed 5th in the state, topping the previous year.

=== Athletics ===
Lubbock High competes in many sports. These include football (boys), wrestling (boys and girls), tennis (boys and girls), basketball (boys and girls), baseball (boys), softball (girls), golf (boys and girls), soccer (boys and girls), volleyball (girls), swimming (boys and girls), gymnastics (boys and girls), and track and field (boys and girls). Boys' teams are called "Westerners," whereas girls' teams are called "Lady Westerners." In 1922, the football team was named "The Pirates" despite the school's mascot being "The Westerner." This changed in the 1930s, and the team's name has been "The Westerners" ever since. LHS was named "AAAAA Texas State Sportsmanship Champion School" in 1998 by the University Interscholastic League.

The Lubbock Westerners football program had its heyday during the 1930s, 1940s and 1950s. The school reached the state championship game in 1938 and 1939, winning in 1939. The team had consecutive 13–0 seasons and 5A state titles in 1951 and 1952. Notable coaches in the 1950s and later included Wilford Moore, Grant Teaff, and Fred Akers. Lubbock High School did not make the playoffs between 1975 and 2012, marking the second longest playoff drought in Texas 5A football. During the 1998 season Lubbock High beat Monterey High School to win the annual Silver Spurs game for the first time in fifteen years. The next year the Westerners to a 16–13 win over Monterey to retain the Silver Spurs. They repeated this feat in 2007–2008. In 2012 the Lubbock High football team made playoffs for the first time in 37 years in the new 4-4A district.

The Lubbock High men's swim team has won 15 straight district championships and the Lubbock High Girls swim team has won 5 straight district championships and a regional championship in 2007. The men's district championship streak is an LISD record for most straight district championships in any sport.

=== Robotics ===
The Lubbock High FIRST Robotics Competition team won the "Against All Odds" award at the FIRST Championship in 1997. This was given because they had raised the money to enter and attend the competition (which took place in Orlando, Florida) themselves, rather than relying on corporate sponsorship like many other competitors did. Lubbock High has also competed in the West Texas BEST competition since 1996.

=== Science Bowl ===
A team from Lubbock High won the first ever National Science Bowl in 1991. The team again achieved a Science Bowl victory in 1992. Lubbock High also won the state Science Bowl for nine consecutive years. In 2020, Lubbock High School placed third at the virtual National Science Bowl.

=== Mariachi and Ballet Folklorico ===
Lubbock High is the first and only high school in the Lubbock area to offer a mariachi music program. The Mariachi program offers instruction in violin, trumpet, guitar, vihuela, guitarra de golpe and guitarron. The mariachi program performs for various Lubbock High, LISD and community functions.

The Ballet Folklorico program was added in 2008. There is an advanced class as well as a beginners class. The dance group performs throughout Lubbock.

=== Lubbock High School NJROTC ===
Lubbock High has an NJROTC (Naval Junior Reserve Officer Training Corps) program as well. In 2010, the Unit qualified for the 15th consecutive year for State, and often places in one of the top three slots in regular Drill Meets. The NJROTC program allows cadets to compete in teams such as Academics, Marksmanship, Armed Drill Team, Unarmed Drill Team, Physical Fitness Team, and Color guards. At the area 9 state championship drill meet the teams placed fourth in both 2010 and 2011, out of 67 schools.

=== Lubbock High Westerner Band ===
The Lubbock high band is the only state band in Lubbock. Recent marching shows include Beyond the Pale (2023), Dash (2024), Mad, Man (2025), and The Singularity (2026)

== Notable alumni ==
- Jerry Allison, songwriter/drummer (The Crickets)
- Hub Bechtol, former Baltimore Colts player
- Charley Brewer, quarterback of the 1951 state championship teams, later Texas Longhorn
- Waggoner Carr, Class of 1936, Speaker of the Texas House of Representatives and attorney general of Texas
- Madisyn Cox, Class of 2013, competitive swimmer
- Sonny Curtis, singer-songwriter
- Mac Davis, singer-songwriter
- Ralna English, Class of 1960, singer with the Lawrence Welk Show from 1969 until it ended/songwriter/performer
- Eric Felton, former New Orleans Saints player
- Grandmaster Ratte', hacker
- James Wesley Hendrix, United States District Court Judge
- Bill Herchman, former San Francisco 49ers player
- Buddy Holly, singer-songwriter/guitarist
- E. J. Holub, professional football player
- Bobby Keys, saxophone player (The Rolling Stones)
- Bob Livingston, singer-songwriter
- Lloyd Maines, musician and producer
- Natalie Maines, singer-songwriter (The Dixie Chicks)
- Joe B. Mauldin, bassist (The Crickets)
- Amanda Shires, singer-songwriter
- Niki Sullivan, guitarist (The Crickets)
- John Tatum, former professional football player
- Spencer Wells, geneticist and anthropologist

== See also ==
- National Register of Historic Places listings in Lubbock County, Texas
- Recorded Texas Historic Landmarks in Lubbock County
