= Jesse Burleson =

American football coach (born c. 1976–1977)

Current position
- Title: Head coach
- Team: Hardin–Simmons
- Conference: ASC
- Record: 125–37

Biographical details
- Born: c. 1976 or 1977 (age 48–49); Clyde, Texas, U.S.
- Education: Hardin–Simmons University (1999, 2017)

Playing career
- 1995–1998: Hardin–Simmons
- Position: Center

Coaching career (HC unless noted)
- 1999: Hardin–Simmons (GA)
- 2000: Clyde HS (TX) (assistant)
- 2001: South Grand Prairie HS (TX) (assistant)
- 2002–2003: Temple HS (TX) (OC)
- 2004–2005: Permian HS (TX) (OC)
- 2006–2007: Hardin–Simmons (OL)
- 2008–2010: Hardin–Simmons (AHC/OL)
- 2011–present: Hardin–Simmons

Head coaching record
- Overall: 125–37
- Tournaments: 1–8 (NCAA D-III playoffs)

Accomplishments and honors

Championships
- 4 ASC (2015, 2023–2025); 1 ASC West Division (2020)

Awards
- 3× All-ASC (1996–1998)

Jesse Burleson (born c. 1976 or 1977) is an American college football coach. He is the head football coach for Hardin–Simmons University, a position he has held since 2011. He also coached for Clyde High School, South Grand Prairie High School, Temple High School, and Permian High School. He played college football for Hardin–Simmons as a center.

== Head coaching record ==
Year	Team	Overall	Conference	Standing	Bowl/playoffs	D3^{#}	AFCA^{°}
Hardin–Simmons Cowboys (American Southwest Conference) (2011–present)
2011	Hardin–Simmons	6–4	4–4	T–4th			
2012	Hardin–Simmons	6–4	5–2	3rd			
2013	Hardin–Simmons	4–6	2–4	T–4th			
2014	Hardin–Simmons	6–3	3–2	3rd			
2015	Hardin–Simmons	9–2	4–1	T–1st	L NCAA Division III First Round	12	
2016	Hardin–Simmons	9–2	5–1	2nd	L NCAA Division III First Round	13	
2017	Hardin–Simmons	9–2	8–1	2nd	L NCAA Division III First Round	11	
2018	Hardin–Simmons	9–2	8–1	2nd	L NCAA Division III First Round	7	
2019	Hardin–Simmons	8–2	7–2	3rd		21	
2020–21	Hardin–Simmons	4–1	4–0	1st (West)			
2021	Hardin–Simmons	9–1	8–1	2nd		10	
2022	Hardin–Simmons	9–2	7–1	2nd	L NCAA Division III First Round	12	
2023	Hardin–Simmons	9–2	6–0	1st	L NCAA Division III First Round	16	17
2024	Hardin–Simmons	10–1	6–0	1st	L NCAA Division III Second Round	4	5
2025	Hardin–Simmons	9–2	5–1	T–1st	L NCAA Division III Second Round	20	19
2026	Hardin–Simmons	9–1	4–1	2nd			
Hardin–Simmons:		125–37	86–22				
Total:		125–37					
National championship Conference title Conference division title or championship game berth
