= Grant Teaff =

American football player and coach

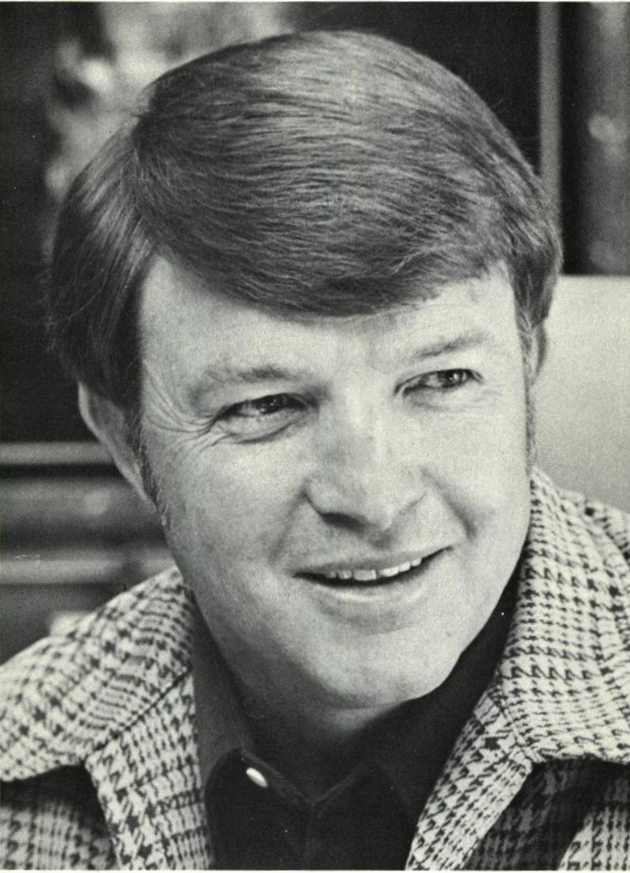
- Teaff, c. 1976

Biographical details
- Born: November 12, 1933 (age 92); Hermleigh, Texas, U.S.

Playing career
- 1953–1954: San Angelo
- 1955: McMurry
- Position: Linebacker

Coaching career (HC unless noted)
- 1956: Lubbock HS (TX) (assistant)
- 1957–1959: McMurry (assistant)
- 1960–1965: McMurry
- 1966–1968: Texas Tech (assistant)
- 1969–1971: Angelo State
- 1972–1992: Baylor

Administrative career (AD unless noted)
- 1992–1993: Baylor
- 1993–2016: AFCA (executive director)

Head coaching record
- Overall: 170–151–8
- Bowls: 4–4

Accomplishments and honors

Championships
- 2 SWC (1974, 1980)

Awards
- AFCA Coach of the Year (1974); Eddie Robinson Coach of the Year (1974); 2x SWC Coach of the Year (1974, 1980); Amos Alonzo Stagg Award (2006)
- College Football Hall of Fame; Inducted in 2001 (profile)

Grant Garland Teaff (/ˈtæf/; born November 12, 1933) is an American former football player and coach. He served as the head coach at McMurry University (1960–1965), Angelo State University (1969–1971), and Baylor University (1972–1992), compiling a career college football record of 170–151–8. In his 21 seasons as head coach of the Baylor Bears football team, Teaff's teams won two Southwest Conference titles and appeared in eight bowl games. His 128 wins are the most of any coach in the history of the program. Teaff was inducted into the College Football Hall of Fame as a coach in 2001.

== Early career ==
Teaff played football at Snyder High School in Snyder, Texas. He continued playing at the college level for San Angelo Junior College (now Angelo State University) and then for McMurry University in Abilene, Texas. When McMurry head coach Wilford Moore was hired to coach for Lubbock High School in 1956, Teaff became his assistant. He then moved on to be an assistant at McMurry University from 1957 to 1959.

Teaff began his head coaching career at McMurry in 1960, serving there until 1965. Among his players were future Pittsburgh Steelers split end Dick Compton and future San Diego Chargers offensive lineman Ernie Park. After a stint as an assistant coach to J. T. King at Texas Tech, Teaff became the head coach at Angelo State University from 1969 to 1971.

== Baylor ==
In 1972, Teaff was hired by Baylor University. Baylor originally hired Rudy Feldman from the University of New Mexico, but Feldman quit after one day, leaving the job to Teaff. The Baylor football team had been 7–43–1 in the five seasons preceding Teaff's arrival. Teaff quickly built Baylor into a competitive team and in 1974, Baylor won eight games and captured the Southwest Conference title for the first time since 1924. In the process they defeated the Texas Longhorns, 34–24, after rallying from a 24–7 halftime deficit. It was Baylor's first victory over Texas in 17 years. The 1974 season and the win over Texas are commonly referred to as the "Miracle on the Brazos," named after the Brazos River near the Baylor campus.

In 1978, Teaff led his team to another unforgettable win. His 2–8 Baylor Bears were set to play No. 9 Texas. Many of the Bears were injured and they were expected to lose. To compensate for the loss of healthy players, Teaff introduced what is now known as the Wildcat formation. To motivate his team, Teaff told them a story of two fishing Eskimos. One was an excellent fisherman, reeling in one catch after another, while the other couldn't land a single fish. The frustrated Eskimo asked his companion for the secret to successful fishing. His friend replied by pulling a worm out of his mouth, saying "you've got to keep the worms warm!" With this story, the coach let his team know that winning may cause momentary discomfort, but if they were able to put that aside for 60 minutes, the end result would be worth it. Teaff told his team "this game is yours”, pulling a worm out of his mouth. The Bears went on to win the game 38–14, finishing the season 3–8.

Teaff remained Baylor’s head football coach until 1992, compiling a winning record and winning the Southwest Conference title for the last time in 1980. His teams won the 1979 Peach Bowl, the 1985 Liberty Bowl, the 1986 Bluebonnet Bowl, and the 1992 John Hancock Bowl, his final game as coach. His teams also earned invitations to the 1975 and 1981 Cotton Bowl Classic, the 1983 Astro-Bluebonnet Bowl, and the 1991 Copper Bowl. His Baylor teams were notable for success against the University of Texas, finishing with a 10–11 record against the Longhorns, including the game during his final season where he got one last win in the series by a 21–20 margin. By comparison, in the 15 seasons preceding Teaff's arrival and the 15 years following Teaff's departure, Baylor had a 1–29 record against Texas.

== Later life and family ==
After retiring from coaching, Teaff became executive director of the American Football Coaches Association in February 1994, which is an organization headquartered in Waco, Texas. The AFCA represents coaches across the United States and is often consulted by the NCAA and the media regarding rule changes and developments that take place in college football.

Teaff is married to the former Donell Phillips and they have three daughters.

== Head coaching record ==
Year	Team	Overall	Conference	Standing	Bowl/playoffs	Coaches^{#}	AP^{°}
McMurry Indians (NAIA independent) (1960–1965)
1960	McMurry	3–7					
1961	McMurry	6–4					
1962	McMurry	6–4					
1963	McMurry	3–7					
1964	McMurry	1–8–1					
1965	McMurry	4–5–1					
McMurry:		23–35–2					
Angelo State Rams (Lone Star Conference) (1969–1971)
1969	Angelo State	6–4	NA	NA			
1970	Angelo State	6–4	6–3	T–3rd			
1971	Angelo State	7–3	6–3	4th			
Angelo State:		19–11	12–6				
Baylor Bears (Southwest Conference) (1972–1992)
1972	Baylor	5–6	3–4	T–4th			
1973	Baylor	2–9	0–7	8th			
1974	Baylor	8–4	6–1	1st	L Cotton	14	14
1975	Baylor	3–6–2	2–5	T–5th			
1976	Baylor	7–3–1	4–3–1	4th		19	
1977	Baylor	5–6	3–5	T–6th			
1978	Baylor	3–8	3–5	T–6th			
1979	Baylor	8–4	5–3	4th	W Peach	15	14
1980	Baylor	10–2	8–0	1st	L Cotton	15	14
1981	Baylor	5–6	3–5	T–6th			
1982	Baylor	4–6–1	3–4–1	5th			
1983	Baylor	7–4–1	4–3–1	T–3rd	L Astro-Bluebonnet		
1984	Baylor	5–6	4–4	6th			
1985	Baylor	9–3	6–2	T–2nd	W Liberty	15	17
1986	Baylor	9–3	6–2	T–2nd	W Bluebonnet	13	12
1987	Baylor	6–5	3–4	T–5th			
1988	Baylor	6–5	2–5	T–4th			
1989	Baylor	5–6	4–4	T–4th			
1990	Baylor	6–4–1	5–2–1	T–3rd			
1991	Baylor	8–4	5–3	T–2nd	L Copper		
1992	Baylor	7–5	4–3	T–2nd	W John Hancock^{†}		
Baylor:		128–105–6	83–74–4				
Total:		170–151–8					
National championship Conference title Conference division title or championship game berth
^{†}Indicates Bowl Coalition bowl.; ^{#}Rankings from final Coaches Poll.; ^{°}Rankings from final AP Poll.
