= Joe Crousen =

American football player and coach (1941–2012)

Biographical details
- Born: March 22, 1941; Quantico, Virginia, U.S.
- Died: July 27, 2012 (aged 71); Abilene, Texas, U.S.

Playing career
- 1959–1960: Angelo State
- 1961–1962: Sul Ross

Coaching career (HC unless noted)
- 1971: Athens HS (TX)
- 1977: R. L. Turner HS (TX)
- 1978–1985: Mississippi State (assistant)
- 2005–2006: McMurry

Head coaching record
- Overall: 8–12 (college)

Joe Winn Crousen Jr. (March 22, 1941 – July 27, 2012) was an American football player and coach. He served as the head football coach at McMurry College in Abilene, Texas from 2005 to 2006, compiling a record of 8–12. He previously served as an assistant football coach at Mississippi State University under the leadership of Emory Bellard in 1978.
