= Byron Dawson =

American football coach (born 1980)

Current position
- Title: Head coach
- Team: Centenary
- Conference: SCAC
- Record: 5–14

Biographical details
- Born: February 9, 1980 (age 46); Shreveport, Louisiana, U.S.
- Education: Louisiana State University (2003)

Playing career
- 1998–2002: LSU
- Position: Defensive tackle

Coaching career (HC unless noted)
- 2003–2004: Redemptorist HS (LA) (DL)
- 2005–2019: Evangel Christian Academy (LA)
- 2020–2021: Tulane (DL)
- 2022–present: Centenary

Head coaching record
- Overall: 5–14 (college); 8–1 (club team); 150–45 (high school)
- Tournaments: 46–10 (LHSAA playoffs)

Byron Tremain Dawson (born February 9, 1980) is an American college football coach. He is the head football coach for Centenary College of Louisiana, a position he has held since 2022. He is the Gentlemen's first football coach following the return of the program after its dissolution in 1947. He was the head football coach for Evangel Christian Academy from 2005 to 2019; winning five Louisiana High School Athletic Association state championships. He also coached for Redemptorist High School and Tulane. He played college football for LSU as a defensive tackle.

== Head coaching record ==
=== College ===
Year	Team	Overall	Conference	Standing	Bowl/playoffs
Centenary Gentlemen (Southern Collegiate Athletic Conference) (2024–present)
2024	Centenary	4–6	4–4	3rd	
2025	Centenary	1–8	1–4	T–4th	
2026	Centenary	0–0	0–0		
Centenary:		5–14	5–8		
Total:		5–14			

=== Club team ===
Year	Team	Overall	Conference	Standing	Bowl/playoffs
Centenary Gentlemen (Club team) (2022–2023)
2022	No team				
2023	Centenary	8–1			
Centenary:		8–1			
Total:		8–1			

=== High school ===
Year	Team	Overall	Conference	Standing	Bowl/playoffs
Evangel Christian Academy Eagles () (2005–2019)
2005	Evangel Christian Academy	12–3	7–0	1st	
2006	Evangel Christian Academy	12–2	7–0	1st	
2007	Evangel Christian Academy	10–3	5–1	2nd	
2008	Evangel Christian Academy	12–3	6–0	1st	
2009	Evangel Christian Academy	14–1	5–0	1st	
2010	Evangel Christian Academy	12–2	5–0	1st	
2011	Evangel Christian Academy	7–6	3–1	2nd	
2012	Evangel Christian Academy	12–3	5–0	1st	
2013	Evangel Christian Academy	8–2	3–0	1st	
2014	Evangel Christian Academy	8–4	5–0	1st	
2015	Evangel Christian Academy	9–3	5–1	T–1st	
2016	Evangel Christian Academy	12–2	6–0	1st	
2017	Evangel Christian Academy	8–2	6–0	1st	
2018	Evangel Christian Academy	8–4	6–0	1st	
2019	Evangel Christian Academy	6–5	4–0	T–1st	
Evangel Christian Academy:		150–45	79–3		
Total:		150–45			
National championship Conference title Conference division title or championship game berth
