= Wilford Moore =

American football player and coach (1919–2014)

Biographical details
- Born: November 20, 1919; Roby, Texas, U.S.
- Died: January 21, 2014 (aged 94); Amarillo, Texas, U.S.

Playing career
- 1938–1940: Hardin–Simmons
- Positions: Guard, linebacker

Coaching career (HC unless noted)
- 1947–1954: McMurry
- 1956–1957: Lubbock HS (TX)
- 1958–1962: Port Neches-Groves HS (TX)
- 1963–1964: Cleburne HS (TX)

Head coaching record
- Overall: 49–29–5 (college); 52–44–5 (high school)
- Bowls: 1–1

Accomplishments and honors

Championships
- 4 Texas Conference (1947–1949, 1953)

Awards
- 3× AP Texas Conference Coach of the Year (1948–1949, 1953)

Wilford Harve Moore (November 20, 1919 – January 21, 2014) was an American football coach. He was the highest winning coach in McMurry Indians football. The McMurry football stadium is named in his honor.

A native of Littlefield, Texas, Moore earned his physical education degree from Hardin–Simmons University in 1941. He was an assistant coach at Abilene High in the fall of 1941, but joined the United States Army Air Corps on December 9 following the attack on Pearl Harbor.

After returning from World War II, he served as an assistant in 1946 at McMurry and then became the head coach the next year, coaching at McMurry from 1947 to 1954. Moore coached the Indians to a 49–29–5 record and led them to the Oleander Bowl in 1949.

Moore later coached at Lubbock High School, Port Neches-Groves High School and Cleburne High School before returning to Abilene, Texas in 1972 where he lived for the rest of his life.

At Hardin–Simmons, he played alongside Bulldog Turner, who later starred for the Chicago Bears in the National Football League (NFL). At McMurry he coached players like Les Cowan, Brad Rowland and Grant Teaff.

Moore was the only person to be inducted into the athletic halls of fame at both Hardin–Simmons University and McMurry University. Since Moore played for Hardin-Simmons and coached at McMurry, both schools created a trophy named in his honor for the crosstown game.

== Head coaching record ==
=== College ===
Year	Team	Overall	Conference	Standing	Bowl/playoffs
McMurry Indians (Texas Conference) (1947–1954)
1947	McMurry	7–3–1	4–1	T–1st	L Boys' Ranch Bowl
1948	McMurry	6–4	4–1	1st	
1949	McMurry	8–2–1	4–0–1	1st	W Oleander Bowl
1950	McMurry	4–5	2–3	T–3rd	
1951	McMurry	3–7	1–3	4th	
1952	McMurry	4–4–1	3–1	2nd	
1953	McMurry	8–1–1	3–1	T–1st	
1954	McMurry	6–3–1	1–1	2nd	
McMurry:		49–29–5	22–11–1		
Total:		49–29–5			
National championship Conference title Conference division title or championship game berth
