= Neal LaHue =

American football coach (born c. 1963)

Current position
- Title: Head coach
- Team: Texas Lutheran
- Conference: SCAC
- Record: 21–20

Biographical details
- Born: c. 1963 (age 62–63); Austin, Texas, U.S.
- Education: Texas A&I University (1985)

Playing career
- 1981–1984: Texas A&I
- Positions: Quarterback, placekicker

Coaching career (HC unless noted)
- 1985–1986: Texas A&I (GA)
- 1987: Texas A&I (WR)
- 1988–1989: Ingleside HS (TX) (RB/DB)
- 1990–1991: Calallen HS (TX) (WR)
- 1992: Seguin HS (TX) (OC)
- 1993–1996: Westlake HS (TX) (OC)
- 1997–2001: Tivy HS (TX)
- 2002–2005: Texas A&M–Kingsville (OC)
- 2006–2012: Roosevelt HS (TX)
- 2013–2017: Hays HS (TX)
- 2018–2019: Texas Lutheran (OC)
- 2020–2021: Texas A&M–Kingsville (OC/QB)
- 2022–present: Texas Lutheran

Administrative career (AD unless noted)
- 1997–2002: Tivy HS (TX)
- 2006–2013: Roosevelt HS (TX)
- 2013–2018: Hays HS (TX)

Head coaching record
- Overall: 21–20 (college); 101–84 (high school)
- Tournaments: 0–1 (NCAA D-III playoffs)

Accomplishments and honors

Championships
- 1 SCAC (2024)

Awards
- Texas A&M–Kingsville Hall of Fame (2011); AFCA All-American (1984); 2× All-LSC (1983–1984)

Neal Albert LaHue (born c. 1963) is an American college football coach. He is the head football coach for Texas Lutheran University, a position he has held since 2022. He was the head football coach for Tivy High School from 1997 to 2001, Theodore Roosevelt High School from 2006 to 2012, and Jack C. Hays High School from 2013 to 2017. He also coached for Ingleside High School, Calallen High School, Westlake High School, and Texas A&M–Kingsville. He played college football for Texas A&I as a quarterback and placekicker.

In 2011, LaHue was inducted into Texas A&M–Kingsville Hall of Fame.

== Personal life ==
LaHue married Margaret Hunter on July 16, 1988.

== Head coaching record ==
=== College ===
Year	Team	Overall	Conference	Standing	Bowl/playoffs
Texas Lutheran Bulldogs (American Southwest Conference) (2022–2023)
2022	Texas Lutheran	4–6	3–5	6th	
2023	Texas Lutheran	2–8	1–5	6th	
Texas Lutheran Bulldogs (Southern Collegiate Athletic Conference) (2024–present)
2024	Texas Lutheran	9–2	7–1	T–1st	L NCAA Division III Second Round
2025	Texas Lutheran	6–4	5–0	1st	
2026	Texas Lutheran	0–0	0–0		
Texas Lutheran:		21–20	16–11		
Total:		21–20			
National championship Conference title Conference division title or championship game berth

=== High school ===
Year	Team	Overall	Conference	Standing	Bowl/playoffs
Tivy Antlers () (1997–2001)
1997	Tivy	7–4		2nd	
1998	Tivy	3–8		3rd	
1999	Tivy	5–6		1st	
2000	Tivy	11–2		2nd	
2001	Tivy	8–3		3rd	
Tivy:		34–23			
Roosevelt Rough Riders () (2006–2012)
2006	Roosevelt	5–5	3–5	6th	
2007	Roosevelt	5–5	4–4	5th	
2008	Roosevelt	7–4	6–2	4th	
2009	Roosevelt	7–4	5–3	4th	
2010	Roosevelt	7–4	4–2	4th	
2011	Roosevelt	2–8	2–4	5th	
2012	Roosevelt	9–3	5–1	2nd	
Roosevelt:		42–33	29–21		
Hays Hawks () (2013–2017)
2013	Hays	9–3	6–1	1st	
2014	Hays	4–6	4–4	5th	
2015	Hays	5–5	4–4	5th	
2016	Hays	3–7	2–4	5th	
2017	Hays	4–7	3–3	4th	
Hays:		25–28	19–16		
Total:		101–84			
National championship Conference title Conference division title or championship game berth
