= McMurry War Hawks football =

College football team in Texas, US

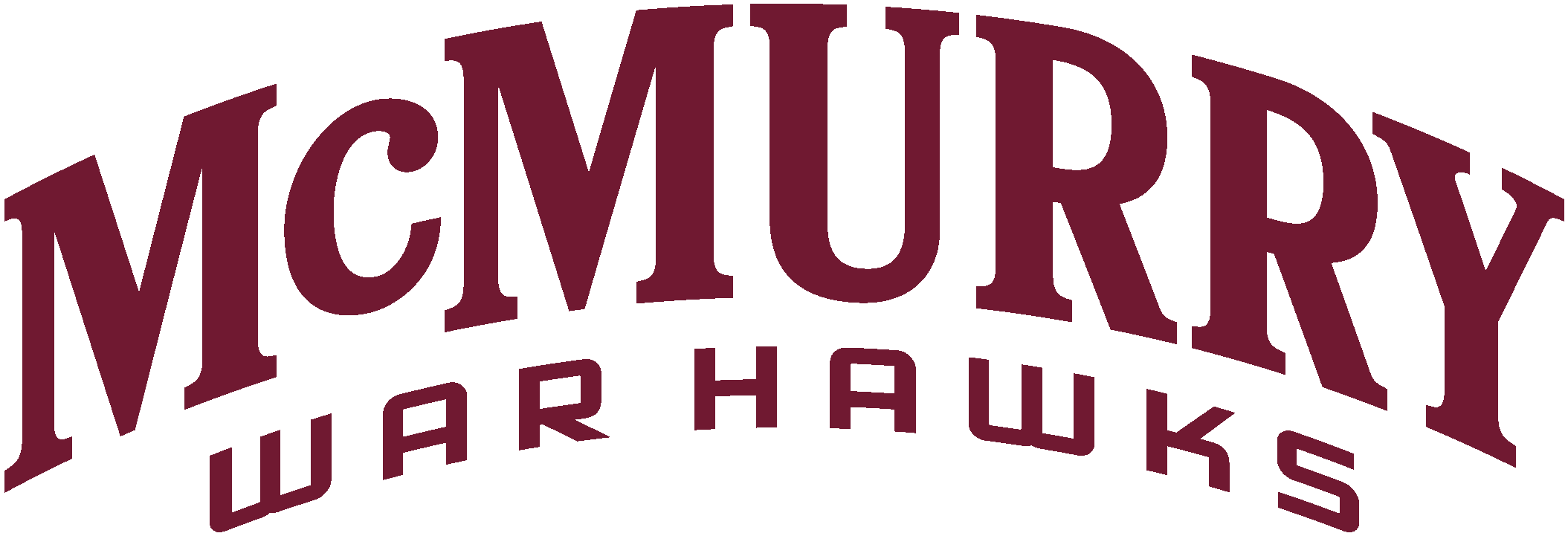
- First season: 1923; 103 years ago
- Athletic director: Larry Dockery
- Head coach: Jordan Neal; 7th season, 18–36 (.333)
- Location: Abilene, Texas
- Stadium: Wilford Moore Stadium (capacity: 3,550)
- Conference: SCAC
- Colors: Maroon and black
- All-time record: 393–525–32 (.431)
- Bowl record: 2–1 (.667)

Conference championships
- 2 TIAA* (1980, 1983); 5 Texas Conference (1947–1949, 1953, 1955); 1 TIAA (1927)
- Website: mcmurrysports.com

The McMurry War Hawks football team represents McMurry University in college football in the National Collegiate Athletic Association (NCAA) at the NCAA Division III level. The War Hawks are members of the Southern Collegiate Athletic Conference (SCAC), fielding its team in the SCAC since 2024. The War Hawks play their home games at Wilford Moore Stadium in Abilene, Texas. The team was known as the McMurry Indians until 2011.

Their head coach is Jordan Neal, who took over the position for the 2019 season.

== Conference affiliations ==
- Independent (1923–1925)
- Texas Intercollegiate Athletic Association (1926–1932)
- Texas Conference (1933–1942)
- No team (1943–1945)
- Texas Conference (1946–1955)
- Independent (1956–1964)
- Lone Star Conference (1965–1972)
- Independent (1973–1975)
- Texas Intercollegiate Athletic Association* (1976–1995)
- American Southwest Conference (1996–2011)
- NCAA Division II independent (2012–2013)
- Lone Star Conference (2014)
- American Southwest Conference (2015–2023)
- Southern Collegiate Athletic Conference (2024–present)

== List of head coaches ==
=== Key ===
Key to symbols in coaches list
| General | | Overall | | Conference | | Postseason (Note: Although the first Rose Bowl Game was played in 1902, it has been continuously played since the 1916 game, and is recognized as the oldest bowl game by the NCAA. "—" indicates any season prior to 1916 when postseason games were not played.) | |
|---|---|---|---|---|---|---|---|
| No. | Order of coaches (Note: A running total of the number of head coaches, with coaches who served separate tenures being counted only once. Interim head coaches are represented with "Int" and are not counted in the running total. "—" indicates the team played but either without a coach or no coach is on record. "X" indicates an interim year without play.) | GC | Games coached | CW | Conference wins | PW | Postseason wins |
| DC | Division championships | OW | Overall wins | CL | Conference losses | PL | Postseason losses |
| CC | Conference championships | OL | Overall losses | CT | Conference ties | PT | Postseason ties |
| NC | National championships | OT | Overall ties (Note: Overtime rules in college football were introduced in 1996, making ties impossible in the period since.) | C% | Conference winning percentage | | |
| † | Elected to the College Football Hall of Fame | O% | Overall winning percentage (Note: When computing the win–loss percentage, a tie counts as half a win and half a loss.) | | | | |

=== Coaches ===
List of head football coaches showing season(s) coached, overall records and conference records
| No. | Name | Season(s) | GC | OW | OL | OT | O% | CW | CL | CT | C% |
|---|---|---|---|---|---|---|---|---|---|---|---|
| 1 | Randolph M. Medley | 1923–1938 | 139 | 61 | 58 | 20 | 0.511 | 38 | 23 | 8 | 0.609 |
| 2 | Dale Morrison | 1939–1941 | 26 | 6 | 19 | 1 | 0.250 | 4 | 16 | 1 | 0.214 |
| 3 | Jim Conger | 1942 | 8 | 2 | 6 | 0 | 0.250 | 1 | 3 | 0 | 0.250 |
| 4 | Vernon Hilliard | 1946 | 9 | 4 | 4 | 1 | 0.500 | 2 | 2 | 0 | 0.500 |
| 5 | Wilford Moore | 1947–1954 | 83 | 49 | 29 | 5 | 0.620 | 22 | 11 | 1 | 0.662 |
| 6 | Douglas Cox | 1955 | 10 | 8 | 2 | 0 | 0.800 | 2 | 0 | 0 | 1.000 |
| 7 | Tommy Ellis | 1956–1959 | 40 | 24 | 16 | 0 | 0.600 | — | — | — | — |
| 8 | Grant Teaff | 1960–1965 | 60 | 23 | 35 | 2 | 0.400 | 0 | 0 | 0 | – |
| 9 | Buddy Fornes | 1966–1972 | 70 | 27 | 42 | 1 | 0.393 | 16 | 30 | 0 | 0.348 |
| 10 | Don Newson | 1973–1975 | 29 | 11 | 18 | 0 | 0.379 | — | — | — | — |
| 11 | Spud Aldridge | 1976–1981 | 63 | 36 | 27 | 0 | 0.571 | 26 | 18 | 0 | 0.591 |
| 12 | Rodney Murphy | 1982–1983 | 19 | 8 | 11 | 0 | 0.421 | 6 | 8 | 0 | 0.429 |
| 13 | Don Birmingham | 1984–1985 | 20 | 4 | 16 | 0 | 0.200 | 3 | 9 | 0 | 0.250 |
| 14 | Cliff Odenwald | 1986–1987 | 20 | 7 | 11 | 2 | 0.400 | 3 | 7 | 2 | 0.333 |
| 15 | Mark Cox | 1988–1990 | 30 | 4 | 26 | 0 | 0.133 | 4 | 22 | 0 | 0.154 |
| 16 | Joe George | 1991–1994 | 39 | 18 | 21 | 0 | 0.462 | 7 | 13 | 0 | 0.350 |
| 17 | Steve Keenum | 1995–2004 | 98 | 36 | 62 | 0 | 0.367 | 26 | 50 | 0 | 0.342 |
| 18 | Joe Crousen | 2005–2006 | 20 | 8 | 12 | 0 | 0.400 | 6 | 11 | 0 | 0.353 |
| 19 | Donny Gray | 2007–2008 | 20 | 2 | 18 | 0 | 0.100 | 1 | 15 | 0 | 0.063 |
| 20 | Hal Mumme | 2009–2012 | 43 | 27 | 16 | 0 | 0.628 | 15 | 9 | 0 | 0.625 |
| 21 | Mason Miller | 2013 | 11 | 3 | 8 | 0 | 0.273 | — | — | — | — |
| 22 | Lance Hinson | 2014–2018 | 49 | 14 | 35 | 0 | 0.286 | 7 | 24 | 0 | 0.226 |
| 23 | Jordan Neal | 2019–present | 44 | 11 | 33 | 0 | 0.250 | 7 | 29 | 0 | 0.194 |

== Year-by-year results ==
| National champions | Conference champions | Bowl game berth | Playoff berth |

| Season | Year | Head coach | Association | Division | Conference | Record | | | | | | | Postseason | Final ranking |
| Season | Year | Head coach | Association | Division | Conference | Overall | | | Conference | | | | Postseason | Final ranking |
| Season | Year | Head coach | Association | Division | Conference | Win | Loss | Tie | Finish | Win | Loss | Tie | Postseason | Final ranking |
McMurry Indians
| 1923 | 1923 | Randolph M. Medley | NCAA | — | Independent | 2 | 3 | 1 | | | | | — | — |
| 1924 | 1924 | Randolph M. Medley | NCAA | — | Independent | 5 | 2 | 1 | | | | | — | — |
| 1925 | 1925 | Randolph M. Medley | NCAA | — | Independent | 3 | 4 | 1 | | | | | — | — |
| 1926 | 1926 | Randolph M. Medley | NCAA | — | TIAA | 1 | 9 | 0 | 6th | 1 | 2 | 0 | — | — |
| 1927 | 1927 | Randolph M. Medley | NCAA | — | TIAA | 4 | 1 | 2 | 1st | 3 | 0 | 2 | — | — |
| 1928 | 1928 | Randolph M. Medley | NCAA | — | TIAA | 6 | 3 | 0 | T–2nd | 4 | 1 | 0 | — | — |
| 1929 | 1929 | Randolph M. Medley | NCAA | — | TIAA | 4 | 1 | 3 | 3rd | 3 | 1 | 1 | — | — |
| 1930 | 1930 | Randolph M. Medley | NCAA | — | TIAA | 3 | 4 | 2 | 5th | 3 | 2 | 1 | — | — |
| 1931 | 1931 | Randolph M. Medley | NCAA | — | TIAA | 2 | 6 | 0 | T–3rd (Western) | 2 | 2 | 0 | — | — |
| 1932 | 1932 | Randolph M. Medley | NCAA | — | TIAA | 2 | 4 | 2 | 4th | 2 | 3 | 0 | — | — |
| 1933 | 1933 | Randolph M. Medley | NCAA | — | Texas Conference | 4 | 4 | 2 | T–3rd | 3 | 2 | 0 | — | — |
| 1934 | 1934 | Randolph M. Medley | NCAA | — | Texas Conference | 3 | 3 | 3 | 4tth | 2 | 1 | 3 | — | — |
| 1935 | 1935 | Randolph M. Medley | NCAA | — | Texas Conference | 6 | 3 | 0 | 2nd | 4 | 2 | 0 | — | — |
| 1936 | 1936 | Randolph M. Medley | NCAA | — | Texas Conference | 8 | 1 | 1 | 3rd | 5 | 1 | 1 | — | — |
| 1937 | 1937 | Randolph M. Medley | NCAA | — | Texas Conference | 7 | 2 | 1 | 3rd | 5 | 2 | 0 | — | — |
| 1938 | 1938 | Randolph M. Medley | NCAA | — | Texas Conference | 1 | 8 | 0 | 9th | 1 | 6 | 0 | — | — |
| 1939 | 1939 | Dale Morrison | NCAA | — | Texas Conference | 1 | 6 | 0 | 8th | 1 | 6 | 0 | — | — |
| 1940 | 1940 | Dale Morrison | NCAA | — | Texas Conference | 1 | 9 | 0 | 7th | 1 | 6 | 0 | — | — |
| 1941 | 1941 | Dale Morrison | NCAA | — | Texas Conference | 4 | 4 | 1 | 5th | 2 | 4 | 1 | — | — |
| 1942 | 1942 | Jim Conger | NCAA | — | Texas Conference | 2 | 6 | 0 | 4th | 1 | 3 | 0 | — | — |
No team from 1943 to 1945 due to World War II.
| 1946 | 1946 | Vernon Hilliard | NCAA | — | Texas Conference | 4 | 4 | 1 | 3rd | 2 | 2 | 0 | — | — |
| 1947 | 1947 | Wilford Moore | NCAA | — | Texas Conference | 7 | 3 | 1 | T–1st | 4 | 1 | 0 | L Boys' Ranch Bowl | — |
| 1948 | 1948 | Wilford Moore | NCAA | — | Texas Conference | 6 | 4 | 0 | 1st | 4 | 1 | 0 | — | — |
| 1949 | 1949 | Wilford Moore | NCAA | — | Texas Conference | 8 | 2 | 1 | 1st | 4 | 0 | 1 | W Oleander Bowl | — |
| 1950 | 1950 | Wilford Moore | NCAA | — | Texas Conference | 4 | 5 | 0 | T–3rd | 2 | 3 | 0 | — | — |
| 1951 | 1951 | Wilford Moore | NCAA | — | Texas Conference | 3 | 7 | 0 | 4th | 1 | 3 | 0 | — | — |
| 1952 | 1952 | Wilford Moore | NCAA | — | Texas Conference | 4 | 4 | 1 | 2nd | 3 | 1 | 0 | — | — |
| 1953 | 1953 | Wilford Moore | NCAA | — | Texas Conference | 8 | 1 | 1 | T–1st | 3 | 1 | 0 | — | — |
| 1954 | 1954 | Wilford Moore | NCAA | — | Texas Conference | 6 | 3 | 1 | 2nd | 1 | 1 | 0 | — | — |
| 1955 | 1955 | Douglas Cox | NCAA | — | Texas Conference | 8 | 2 | 0 | 1st | 2 | 0 | 0 | — | — |
| 1956 | 1956 | Tommy Ellis | NAIA | — | Independent | 5 | 5 | 0 | | | | | — | — |
| 1957 | 1957 | Tommy Ellis | NAIA | — | Independent | 5 | 5 | 0 | | | | | — | — |
| 1958 | 1958 | Tommy Ellis | NAIA | — | Independent | 6 | 4 | 0 | | | | | — | — |
| 1959 | 1959 | Tommy Ellis | NAIA | — | Independent | 8 | 2 | 0 | | | | | — | 9 |
| 1960 | 1960 | Grant Teaff | NAIA | — | Independent | 3 | 7 | 0 | | | | | — | — |
| 1961 | 1961 | Grant Teaff | NAIA | — | Independent | 6 | 4 | 0 | | | | | — | — |
| 1962 | 1962 | Grant Teaff | NAIA | — | Independent | 6 | 4 | 0 | | | | | — | — |
| 1963 | 1963 | Grant Teaff | NAIA | — | Independent | 3 | 7 | 0 | | | | | — | — |
| 1964 | 1964 | Grant Teaff | NAIA | — | Independent | 1 | 8 | 1 | | | | | — | — |
| 1965 | 1965 | Grant Teaff | NAIA | — | LSC | 4 | 5 | 1 | N/A | 0 | 0 | 0 | — | — |
| 1966 | 1966 | Buddy Fornes | NAIA | — | LSC | 1 | 8 | 1 | 8th | 0 | 6 | 1 | — | — |
| 1967 | 1967 | Buddy Fornes | NAIA | — | LSC | 6 | 4 | 0 | T–3rd | 4 | 3 | 0 | — | — |
| 1968 | 1968 | Buddy Fornes | NAIA | — | LSC | 8 | 2 | 0 | 3rd | 5 | 2 | 0 | — | — |
| 1969 | 1969 | Buddy Fornes | NAIA | — | LSC | 2 | 8 | 0 | 8th | 1 | 6 | 0 | — | — |
| 1970 | 1970 | Buddy Fornes | NAIA | Division I | LSC | 5 | 6 | 0 | T–5th | 4 | 5 | 0 | — | — |
| 1971 | 1971 | Buddy Fornes | NAIA | Division I | LSC | 2 | 8 | 0 | T–8th | 2 | 7 | 0 | — | — |
| 1972 | 1972 | Buddy Fornes | NAIA | Division I | LSC | 3 | 6 | 0 | N/A | 0 | 0 | 0 | — | — |
| 1973 | 1973 | Don Newson | NAIA | ? | Independent | 3 | 6 | 0 | | | | | — | — |
| 1974 | 1974 | Don Newson | NAIA | ? | Independent | 6 | 4 | 0 | | | | | — | — |
| 1975 | 1975 | Don Newson | NAIA | ? | Independent | 2 | 8 | 0 | | | | | — | — |
| 1976 | 1976 | Spud Aldridge | NAIA | Division II | TIAA* | 3 | 8 | 0 | T–3rd | 1 | 3 | 0 | — | — |
| 1977 | 1977 | Spud Aldridge | NAIA | Division II | TIAA* | 6 | 4 | 0 | 3rd | 2 | 2 | 0 | — | — |
| 1978 | 1978 | Spud Aldridge | NAIA | Division II | TIAA* | 7 | 3 | 0 | 2nd | 5 | 3 | 0 | — | — |
| 1979 | 1979 | Spud Aldridge | NAIA | Division II | TIAA* | 8 | 3 | 0 | 2nd | 6 | 2 | 0 | — | — |
| 1980 | 1980 | Spud Aldridge | NAIA | Division II | TIAA* | 9 | 2 | 0 | 1st | 9 | 1 | 0 | L NAIA Division II Quarterfinal | 8 |
| 1981 | 1981 | Spud Aldridge | NAIA | Division II | TIAA* | 3 | 7 | 0 | 4th | 3 | 7 | 0 | — | — |
| 1982 | 1982 | Rodney Murphy | NAIA | Division II | TIAA* | 2 | 8 | 0 | 4th | 2 | 6 | 0 | — | — |
| 1983 | 1983 | Rodney Murphy | NAIA | Division II | TIAA* | 6 | 3 | 0 | T–1st | 4 | 2 | 0 | — | — |
| 1984 | 1984 | Don Birmingham | NAIA | Division II | TIAA* | 3 | 7 | 0 | 3rd | 2 | 4 | 0 | — | — |
| 1985 | 1985 | Don Birmingham | NAIA | Division II | TIAA* | 1 | 9 | 0 | 4th | 1 | 5 | 0 | — | — |
| 1986 | 1986 | Cliff Odenwald | NAIA | Division II | TIAA* | 4 | 6 | 0 | T–2nd | 2 | 4 | 0 | — | — |
| 1987 | 1987 | Cliff Odenwald | NAIA | Division II | TIAA* | 3 | 5 | 2 | 3rd | 1 | 3 | 2 | — | — |
| 1988 | 1988 | Mark Cox | NAIA | Division II | TIAA* | 1 | 9 | 0 | 6th | 1 | 9 | 0 | — | — |
| 1989 | 1989 | Mark Cox | NAIA | Division II | TIAA* | 2 | 8 | 0 | T–5th | 2 | 8 | 0 | — | — |
| 1990 | 1990 | Mark Cox | NAIA | Division II | TIAA* | 1 | 9 | 0 | 7th | 1 | 5 | 0 | — | — |
| 1991 | 1991 | Joe George | NAIA | Division II | TIAA* | 3 | 7 | 0 | 6th | 0 | 5 | 0 | — | — |
| 1992 | 1992 | Joe George | NAIA | Division II | TIAA* | 4 | 6 | 0 | T–3rd | 2 | 3 | 0 | — | — |
| 1993 | 1993 | Joe George | NAIA | Division II | TIAA* | 8 | 2 | 0 | 2nd | 4 | 1 | 0 | — | 18 |
| 1994 | 1994 | Joe George | NAIA | Division II | TIAA* | 3 | 6 | 0 | 5th | 1 | 4 | 0 | — | — |
| 1995 | 1995 | Steve Keenum | NAIA | Division II | TIAA* | 1 | 9 | 0 | 5th | 0 | 8 | 0 | — | — |
| 1996 | 1996 | Steve Keenum | NAIA | Division II | ASC | 3 | 7 | 0 | T–4th | 1 | 3 | 0 | — | — |
| 1997 | 1997 | Steve Keenum | NCAA | Division III | ASC | 5 | 5 | 0 | T–3rd | 2 | 3 | 0 | — | — |
| 1998 | 1998 | Steve Keenum | NCAA | Division III | ASC | 8 | 2 | 0 | 2nd | 6 | 1 | 0 | — | — |
| 1999 | 1999 | Steve Keenum | NCAA | Division III | ASC | 7 | 2 | 0 | 2nd | 6 | 1 | 0 | — | — |
| 2000 | 2000 | Steve Keenum | NCAA | Division III | ASC | 6 | 4 | 0 | 5th | 5 | 4 | 0 | — | — |
| 2001 | 2001 | Steve Keenum | NCAA | Division III | ASC | 0 | 9 | 0 | 10th | 0 | 8 | 0 | — | — |
| 2002 | 2002 | Steve Keenum | NCAA | Division III | ASC | 0 | 10 | 0 | 10th | 0 | 9 | 0 | — | — |
| 2003 | 2003 | Steve Keenum | NCAA | Division III | ASC | 4 | 6 | 0 | T–5th | 4 | 5 | 0 | — | — |
| 2004 | 2004 | Steve Keenum | NCAA | Division III | ASC | 2 | 8 | 0 | T–9th | 1 | 8 | 0 | — | — |
| 2005 | 2005 | Joe Crousen | NCAA | Division III | ASC | 5 | 5 | 0 | 7th | 4 | 5 | 0 | — | — |
| 2006 | 2006 | Joe Crousen | NCAA | Division III | ASC | 3 | 7 | 0 | 9th | 2 | 6 | 0 | — | — |
| 2007 | 2007 | Donny Gray | NCAA | Division III | ASC | 2 | 8 | 0 | T–9th | 1 | 7 | 0 | — | — |
| 2008 | 2008 | Donny Gray | NCAA | Division III | ASC | 0 | 10 | 0 | 9th | 0 | 8 | 0 | — | — |
| 2009 | 2009 | Hal Mumme | NCAA | Division III | ASC | 4 | 6 | 0 | 5th | 4 | 4 | 0 | — | — |
| 2010 | 2010 | Hal Mumme | NCAA | Division III | ASC | 6 | 4 | 0 | T–4th | 4 | 4 | 0 | — | — |
McMurry War Hawks
| 2011 | 2011 | Hal Mumme | NCAA | Division III | ASC | 9 | 3 | 0 | 2nd | 7 | 1 | 0 | L NCAA Division III Second Round | 14 |
| 2012 | 2012 | Hal Mumme | NCAA | Division II | Independent | 8 | 3 | 0 | | | | | W C.H.A.M.P.S. Heart of Texas Bowl | — |
| 2013 | 2013 | Mason Miller | NCAA | Division II | Independent | 3 | 8 | 0 | | | | | — | — |
| 2014 | 2014 | Lance Hinson | NCAA | Division II | LSC | 2 | 8 | 0 | 7th | 1 | 6 | 0 | — | — |
| 2015 | 2015 | Lance Hinson | NCAA | Division III | ASC | 4 | 6 | 0 | N/A | 0 | 0 | 0 | — | — |
| 2016 | 2016 | Lance Hinson | NCAA | Division III | ASC | 4 | 5 | 0 | 5th | 2 | 4 | 0 | — | — |
| 2017 | 2017 | Lance Hinson | NCAA | Division III | ASC | 2 | 8 | 0 | T–7th | 2 | 7 | 0 | — | — |
| 2018 | 2018 | Lance Hinson | NCAA | Division III | ASC | 2 | 8 | 0 | T–7th | 2 | 7 | 0 | — | — |
| 2019 | 2019 | Jordan Neal | NCAA | Division III | ASC | 0 | 10 | 0 | 10th | 0 | 9 | 0 | — | — |
| 2020–21 | 2020 | Jordan Neal | NCAA | Division III | ASC | 2 | 3 | 0 | 4th (West) | 1 | 3 | 0 | — | — |
| 2021 | 2021 | Jordan Neal | NCAA | Division III | ASC | 2 | 7 | 0 | T–8th | 2 | 7 | 0 | — | — |
| 2022 | 2022 | Jordan Neal | NCAA | Division III | ASC | 1 | 9 | 0 | T–8th | 1 | 7 | 0 | — | — |
| 2023 | 2023 | Jordan Neal | NCAA | Division III | ASC | 6 | 4 | 0 | T–3rd | 3 | 3 | 0 | — | — |
| 2024 | 2024 | Jordan Neal | NCAA | Division III | SCAC | 7 | 3 | 0 | T–1st | 7 | 1 | 0 | — | — |
| 2025 | 2025 | Jordan Neal | NCAA | Division III | SCAC | 6 | 4 | 0 | 2nd | 4 | 1 | 0 | — | — |

== Wilford Moore Stadium ==
Wilford Moore Stadium
- Location: 1560 Ross Ave; Abilene, TX 79605
- Owner: McMurry University
- Operator: McMurry University
- Capacity: 3,550
- Surface: FieldTurf

Construction
- Opened: 1937

Tenant
- McMurry War Hawks (NCAA) (1937–1942, 1950–1959, 1974–present)

Wilford Moore Stadium is a football stadium in Abilene, Texas, with a seating capacity of 3,550. It is home to McMurry University War Hawks football team. It is named after Wilford Moore who was the head football coach from 1947 to 1954 after being previously known as Indian Stadium.

The stadium initially had a capacity of 4,500 but has since been lowered to 3,550.

== Rivalries ==
=== Hardin–Simmons ===
The Hardin–Simmons–McMurry football rivalry is an American college football rivalry between the Hardin–Simmons Cowboys and McMurry War Hawks, with the rivalry referred to as the Crosstown Showdown, with both universities located approximately 10 minutes from each other in Abilene. The winner is given the Wilford Moore Trophy, named after Wilford Moore, who was a player at Hardin–Simmons and a coach at McMurry. Moore is the only person to be inducted into the athletic halls of fame at both Hardin–Simmons University and McMurry University. Following the 2023 meeting, Hardin–Simmons leads the all-time series 33–4.

=== Sul Ross ===
The Battle of I-20 is the name given to the McMurry–Sul Ross football rivalry. Going into the 2019 match-up McMurry led the all-time series 46–40–2; the Lobos would win that year's game 21–7. As of the 2023 season, the two teams have met 93 times with McMurry leading the series 48–43–2. The future of the rivalry remains uncertain as Sul Ross joined the Lone Star Conference in 2024, which competes at the Division II level, while McMurry competes in the Division III Southern Collegiate Athletic Conference.
