= Texas Lutheran Bulldogs football =

- First season: 1912
- Head coach: Neal LaHue; 4th season, 21–20 (.512)
- Location: Seguin, Texas
- Stadium: Bulldog Stadium
- NCAA division: Division III
- Conference: SCAC
- Colors: Black and gold

NAIA national championships
- NAIA Division II: 1974, 1975
- Mascot: Bulldogs
- Website: TLU Bulldogs

The Texas Lutheran Bulldogs football team represent Texas Lutheran University, located in Seguin, Texas, in NCAA Division III college football.

The Bulldogs, who began playing football in 1912, compete as members of the Southern Collegiate Athletic Conference.

Texas Lutheran claim two back-to-back national championships in football for the 1974 and 1975 seasons in the NAIA Division II Football National Championship. Both seasons were coached under legendary head coach Jim Wacker, who later went on to be a head coach at North Dakota State University (1976–1978), Southwest Texas State University, which is now Texas State University (1979–1982), Texas Christian University (1983–1991), and the University of Minnesota (1992–1996).

== History ==
=== Conferences ===
- 1912–1987: Independent
- 1988–1997: Program disbanded
- 1998–2013, 2017–2023: American Southwest Conference
- 2013–2016, 2024–present: Southern Collegiate Athletic Conference

== Championships ==
=== National championships ===
Year	Association	Division	Head coach	Record	Opponent	Result
1974	NAIA (2)	Division II (2)	Jim Wacker	11–0	Missouri Valley	W, 42–0
1975	NAIA (2)	Division II (2)	Jim Wacker	11–1	Cal Lutheran	W, 34–8

== Postseason appearances ==
=== NCAA Division III playoffs ===
The Bulldogs have made two appearances in the NCAA Division III playoffs, with a combined record of 0–2.

Year	Round	Opponent	Result
2024	Second Round	Linfield	L, 3–65
2026	First Round	Hardin–Simmons	L, 31–34

=== NAIA playoffs ===
The Bulldogs made three appearances in the NAIA playoffs, with a combined record of 4–1 and two national championships.

Year	Round	Opponent	Result
1974	Semifinals; National Championship	Linfield; Missouri Valley	W, 52–8; W, 42–0
1975	Semifinals; National Championship	Hanover; Cal Lutheran	W, 32–13; W, 34–8
1976	Semifinals	Westminster (PA)	L, 0–31
