= 2010 Millsaps Majors football team =

American college football season

2010 Millsaps Majors football
- Conference: Southern Collegiate Athletic Conference
- Record: 7–3 (5–1 SCAC)
- Head coach: Aaron Pelch (1st season)

2010 Southern Collegiate Athletic Conference football standings
	Conf.			Overall
Team	W		L	W		L
DePauw $^	6	–	0	9	–	2
Millsaps	5	–	1	7	–	3
Centre	3	–	3	6	–	4
Rhodes	3	–	3	4	–	6
Austin	2	–	4	4	–	5
Trinity (TX)	2	–	4	4	–	6
Sewanee	0	–	6	1	–	9
Birmingham–Southern #		–		6	–	4
$ – Conference champion; ^ – NCAA Division III playoff participant; # – Provisional Division III member; games not counted in standings

The 2010 Millsaps Majors football team represented Millsaps College as a member of the Southern Collegiate Athletic Conference (SCAC) during the 2010 NCAA Division III football season. On March 1, 2010, Aaron Pelch was named head coach to succeed Mike DuBose. Pelch, a former Weber State University player and 2001 graduate, was a defensive assistant for DuBose's Majors from 2006 to 2008, before joining Tom Cable's Oakland Raiders staff as a special teams coach in 2009.

Pelch guided the Majors to a 7–3 overall record in his first season, but the team saw its streak of four consecutive SCAC championships snapped by virtue of a 35–21 home loss to DePauw, who finished the year 6–0 in conference play. The Majors' 2011 senior class tied the record set by the previous year's senior class of most career victories, with 33 in a four-year span. For the fifth year in a row, the Majors' offense was the SCAC's highest scoring unit.

== Schedule ==
Date	Time	Opponent	Site	Result	Attendance	Source
September 4	7:00 pm	Mississippi College*	Harper Davis Field; Jackson, MS (rivalry)	L 23–27	1,510	
September 11	12:00 pm	at LaGrange*	Callaway Stadium; LaGrange, GA	L 21–27 ^{OT}	1,450	
September 18	1:00 pm	Austin	Harper Davis Field; Jackson, MS	W 38–24	302	
September 25	1:30 pm	at Trinity (TX)	Trinity Stadium; San Antonio, TX	W 27–23	2,121	
October 2	1:00 pm	DePauw	Harper Davis Field; Jackson, MS	L 21–35	1,674	
October 9	1:00 pm	Huntingdon*^{†}	Harper Davis Field; Jackson, MS	W 35–19	1,434	
October 16	1:00 pm	at Rhodes	Fargason Field; Memphis, TN	W 70–31	929	
October 23	1:30 pm	at Centre	Farris Stadium; Danville, KY	W 30–18	1,034	
October 30	1:00 pm	Sewanee	Harper Davis Field; Jackson, MS	W 30–0	1,123	
November 13	1:00 pm	at Birmingham–Southern*	Panther Stadium; Birmingham, AL	W 28–17	2,847	
*Non-conference game; ^{†}Homecoming; All times are in Central time
