= 2009 Millsaps Majors football team =

American college football season

2009 Millsaps Majors football

SCAC co-champion
- Conference: Southern Collegiate Athletic Conference
- Record: 7–3 (5–1 SCAC)
- Head coach: Mike DuBose (4th season)
- Offensive coordinator: John David Caffey (2nd season)
- Defensive coordinator: Mike Dubose (5th season)

2009 Southern Collegiate Athletic Conference football standings
	Conf.			Overall
Team	W		L	W		L
DePauw +^	5	–	1	7	–	3
Millsaps +	5	–	1	7	–	3
Centre	4	–	2	7	–	2
Trinity (TX)	4	–	2	7	–	3
Austin	2	–	4	4	–	5
Rhodes	1	–	5	3	–	7
Sewanee	0	–	6	0	–	9
Birmingham–Southern #		–		4	–	6
+ – Conference co-champions; ^ – NCAA Division III playoff participant; # – Provisional Division III member; games not counted in standings

The 2009 Millsaps Majors football team represented Millsaps College during the 2009 NCAA Division III football season. In 2009, the Majors finished 5-1 in SCAC play to again earn a share of the conference title. The team's fourth conference championship in as many years was added to the accomplishments of the winningest senior class in the program's history, who finished their four-year careers with a 33-10 overall record.

However, the team had hoped to attain another NCAA playoff berth, a cause derailed by three painfully close loses. First, the Majors lost to their rival Choctaws in two overtimes in the season-opening ninth edition of the renewed Backyard Brawl. Millsaps won their next three games, including an emotional 24-6 victory over Trinity after a week in which Coach DuBose's wife Polly underwent the first of several breast cancer surgeries that took place during the season.

The following week Coach DuBose spent limited time with the team while caring for his wife, as the Majors prepared for an important conference road game. The team traveled to Greencastle, Indiana to face DePauw. Coincidentally, the game fell on the first weekend of National Breast Cancer Awareness Month (October), and DePauw had painted a pair of pink ribbons on their field in support of the event. In a show of outstanding camaraderie and sportsmanship, DePauw had then inscribed "P.D." in each of the ribbons for Polly DuBose. The Majors put forth a valiant effort in the game, coming from 16 down to within a two-point conversion of tying the game with under four minutes to play. The two point attempt failed when running back Shane Bowser could not escape an open field tackle and came up less than a yard short of the endzone. DePauw was able to run out the clock and preserve the victory, handing the Majors only their second conference loss of DuBose's tenure in heartbreaking fashion, after the Majors had won 10 straight dating back to that fateful 2007 contest against Trinity.

The next week the Majors came up with another disappointing loss, again on the road, this time at the hands of Huntingdon. Millsaps squandered a 36-24 third quarter advantage, as Huntingdon's potent offense caught fire in the second half. The Majors' normally powerful offensive unit sputtered as two quarterbacks were forced to leave the game due to injury and the team could only watch as Huntingdon roared back to claim a 47-36 victory.

The team finished the season on a positive note, handily dispatching of their last four opponents, including a homecoming victory over previously undefeated Centre. A 61-7 dismantling of Sewanee the following week secured the program's share of a fourth consecutive conference title.

Junior return specialist Michael Galatas was named the SCAC's "Special Teams Player of the Year" for the second consecutive season, the fourth consecutive season the award went to a Major, and junior linebacker Will Hawkins was the conference's "Defensive Player of the Year", and a first team All-American. A total of 20 Majors were voted to the all-conference first, second and honorable mention teams.

== Schedule ==
Date	Time	Opponent	Site	Result	Attendance
September 5	7:20 pm	at Mississippi College*	Robinson-Hale Stadium; Clinton, MS (rivalry)	L 44–47 ^{2OT}	4,348
September 12	1:00 pm	Belhaven*	Harper Davis Field; Jackson, MS (Riverside Rumble)	W 27–10	1,224
September 19	1:00 pm	at Austin	Jerry Apple Stadium; Sherman, TX	W 31–30	1,100
September 26	1:00 pm	Trinity (TX)	Harper Davis Field; Jackson, MS	W 24–6	1,802
October 3	12:00 pm	at DePauw	Blackstock Stadium; Greencastle, IN	L 27–29	2,000
October 10	1:00 pm	at Huntingdon*	Charles Lee Field at Samford Stadium; Montgomery, AL	L 36–47	1,747
October 17	1:00 pm	Rhodes	Harper Davis Field; Jackson, MS	W 38–22	527
October 24	1:00 pm	No. 25 Centre^{†}	Harper Davis Field; Jackson, MS	W 24–0	1,763
October 31	1:30 pm	at Sewanee	McGee Field; Sewanee, TN	W 61–7	339
November 14	1:00 pm	Birmingham–Southern*	Harper Davis Field; Jackson, MS	W 38–20	717
*Non-conference game; ^{†}Homecoming; Rankings from D3football.com Poll released prior to the game; All times are in Central time

== After the season ==
In December, DuBose announced he was leaving Millsaps to join new Memphis coach Larry Porter's staff. DuBose's tenure ended with 33 victories in four seasons, prior to which the Majors had won just 37 games in 10 years, and DuBose's four consecutive conference championships came after the Majors had won only two since joining the SCAC in 1989. DuBose's .767 winning percentage is the highest of any coach in the school's history and only Harper Davis won more games as the Majors' head coach.
