= 2007 Millsaps Majors football team =

American college football season

2007 Millsaps Majors football

SCAC co-champion
- Conference: Southern Collegiate Athletic Conference
- Record: 8–2 (6–1 SCAC)
- Head coach: Mike DuBose (2nd season)
- Offensive coordinator: Shannon Dawson (2nd season)
- Defensive coordinator: Mike Dubose (3rd season)
- Home stadium: Harper Davis Field

2007 Southern Collegiate Athletic Conference football standings
	Conf.			Overall
Team	W		L	W		L
No. 16 Trinity (TX) +^	6	–	1	9	–	2
Millsaps +	6	–	1	8	–	2
DePauw	5	–	2	8	–	2
Centre	4	–	3	6	–	4
Rhodes	4	–	3	6	–	4
Austin	2	–	5	4	–	6
Colorado College	1	–	6	4	–	6
Sewanee	0	–	7	1	–	8
Birmingham–Southern #		–		1	–	7
+ – Conference co-champions; ^ – NCAA Division III playoff participant; # – Provisional Division III member; games not counted in standings; Rankings from D3football.com

The 2007 Millsaps Majors football team represented Millsaps College during the 2007 NCAA Division III football season. The team opened with a loss to cross-town rival Mississippi College and won its next six games before losing again on a last-second 61-yard touchdown run (featuring multiple laterals) in the 2007 Trinity vs. Millsaps football game. The Majors closed the season with two victories to earn a share of the Southern Collegiate Athletic Conference (SCAC) title.

Junior quarterback Juan Joseph was selected as the SCAC's "Offensive Player of the Year" for the second consecutive season, and senior defensive tackle Casey Younger was the league's co-"Defensive Player of the Year". Sophomore return specialist John Milazzo was the SCAC's "Special Teams Player of the Year." In all, 19 Majors were named to the All-SCAC first team, second team and honorable mention lists.

== Schedule ==
Date	Time	Opponent	Rank	Site	Result	Attendance
August 30	7:00 pm	at Mississippi College*		Robinson-Hale Stadium; Clinton, MS (rivalry)	L 26–27	5,293
September 8	4:00 pm	at Louisiana College*		D. C. Bates Stadium; Pineville, LA	W 44–10	3,877
September 15	1:00 pm	at Austin		Jerry Apple Stadium; Sherman, TX	W 43–10	1,200
September 22	1:00 pm	Rhodes		Harper Davis Field; Jackson MS	W 42–0	2,112
September 29	1:00 pm	at DePauw		Blackstock Stadium; Greencastle, IN	W 35–17	3,500
October 6	1:00 pm	Centre		Harper Davis Field; Jackson, MS	W 29–7	1,098
October 13	1:30 pm	at Sewanee		McGee Field; Sewanee, TN	W 45–7	2,093
October 27	1:00 pm	No. 19 Trinity (TX)^{†}	No. 24	Harper Davis Field; Jackson, MS	L 24–28	4,032
November 3	1:00 pm	at Colorado College		Washburn Field; Colorado Springs, Colorado	W 68–6	684
November 10	1:00 pm	Birmingham–Southern*		Harper Davis Field; Jackson, MS	W 58–7	1,899
*Non-conference game; ^{†}Homecoming; Rankings from D3football.com Poll released prior to the game; All times are in Central time
