= 2006 Millsaps Majors football team =

American college football season

2006 Millsaps Majors football

SCAC champion

NCAA Division III First Round, L 0–21 at Carnegie Mellon
- Conference: Southern Collegiate Athletic Conference
- Record: 7–4 (6–0 SCAC)
- Head coach: Mike DuBose (1st season)
- Offensive coordinator: Shannon Dawson (1st season)
- Defensive coordinator: Mike Dubose (2nd season)
- Home stadium: Harper Davis Field

2006 Southern Collegiate Athletic Conference football standings
	Conf.			Overall
Team	W		L	W		L
Millsaps $^	6	–	0	7	–	4
Trinity (TX)	5	–	1	8	–	2
DePauw	3	–	3	6	–	4
Rhodes	3	–	3	6	–	4
Centre	2	–	4	5	–	5
Austin	2	–	4	4	–	6
Sewanee	0	–	6	2	–	8
$ – Conference champion; ^ – NCAA Division III playoff participant

The 2006 Millsaps Majors football team represented Millsaps College as a member of the Southern Collegiate Athletic Conference during the 2006 NCAA Division III football season.

Coach DuBose's first season got off to a rocky start. The Majors were hammered 52–28 by Mississippi College in the season-opening Backyard Brawl game, which returned after a one-year hiatus in 2005. The Majors then lost their next two games in heartbreaking fashion, by a combined total of four points. However, DuBose's team managed an incredible turn-around that shocked the SCAC, when the team went on to win their next six games to set up a showdown with perennial SCAC juggernaut Trinity in the season finale. Each team entered the contest at 5–0 in conference play, meaning the winner would receive the SCAC's automatic playoff bid and claim the SCAC title outright.

Trinity, ranked 21st nationally, was heavily favored to end the Majors' incredible run; the Tigers had won or shared 13 consecutive SCAC championships dating back to 1993 (Millsaps and Trinity shared the title in 1996) and were winners of five straight contests against the Majors, including a 41–0 blowout the previous year in San Antonio. However, the Majors stunned the Tigers 34–12, emerging victorious behind a three touchdown-performance from senior wide receiver Chris Jackson, who returned two punts for scores and caught another. The win gave Millsaps a 6–0 final record in conference play (7–3 overall), earning the Majors their third SCAC title (their first won outright) and the league's automatic playoff bid for the first time. The tournament appearance was just the second in the program's history, the first since 1975.

DuBose was named the SCAC's 2006 "Coach of the Year" for engineering the Majors' remarkable turn-around. Sophomore quarterback Juan Joseph was named the league's "Offensive Player of the Year" and Chris Jackson was honored as the league's "Special Teams Player of the Year" and named a first team All-American for his role as the team's return specialist. In all, 20 Majors were named to the All-SCAC first team, second team and honorable mention lists.

== Schedule ==
Date	Time	Opponent	Site	Result	Attendance
September 2	7:00 pm	Mississippi College*	Harper Davis Field; Jackson, MS (rivalry)	L 28–52	5,217
September 9	1:00 pm	Louisiana College*	Harper Davis Field; Jackson, MS	L 38–41	1,038
September 16	12:00 pm	Huntingdon*	Harper Davis Field; Jackson, MS	L 34–35	752
September 30	12:00 pm	Lincoln (MO)*	Harper Davis Field; Jackson, MS	W 52–10	762
October 7	1:00 pm	Centre	Harper Davis Field; Jackson, MS	W 38–12	714
October 14	1:30 pm	at Austin	Jerry Apple Stadium; Sherman, TX	W 26–11	1,000
October 21	1:30 pm	DePauw	Harper Davis Field; Jackson, MS	W 31–7	675
October 28	1:30 pm	at Sewanee	McGee Stadium; Sewanee, TN	W 35–18	2,833
November 4	1:00 pm	at Rhodes	Fargason Field; Memphis, TN	W 14–6	1,500
November 11	1:30 pm	No. 21 Trinity (TX)^{†}	Harper Davis Field; Jackson, MS	W 34–12	3,784
November 18	12:00 pm	at No. 24 Carnegie Mellon*	Gesling Field; Pittsburgh, PA (NCAA Division III First Round)	L 0–21	1,632
*Non-conference game; ^{†}Homecoming; Rankings from D3football.com Poll released prior to the game; All times are in Central time
