= 2008 Millsaps Majors football team =

American college football season

2008 Millsaps Majors football

SCAC champion

NCAA Division III Second Round, L 20–35 vs. Washington & Jefferson
- Conference: Southern Collegiate Athletic Conference
- Record: 11–1 (6–0 SCAC)
- Head coach: Mike DuBose (3rd season)
- Offensive coordinator: John David Caffey (1st season)
- Defensive coordinator: Mike Dubose (4th season)
- Home stadium: Harper Davis Field

2008 Southern Collegiate Athletic Conference football standings
	Conf.			Overall
Team	W		L	W		L
No. 12 Millsaps $^	7	–	0	11	–	1
DePauw	5	–	2	8	–	2
Trinity (TX)	5	–	2	8	–	2
Centre	5	–	2	7	–	3
Austin	3	–	4	5	–	5
Rhodes	2	–	5	4	–	6
Sewanee	1	–	6	2	–	8
Colorado College	0	–	7	0	–	9
Birmingham–Southern #		–		3	–	7
$ – Conference champion; ^ – NCAA Division III playoff participant; # – Provisional Division III member; games not counted in standings; Rankings from D3football.com

The 2008 Millsaps Majors football team represented Millsaps College during the 2008 NCAA Division III football season. The Majors rolled through the regular season, going 10-0 and outscoring their opponents 442 to 132. The team avenged 2007's crushing loses at the hands of Mississippi College and Trinity, pummeling the Choctaws 42-6 in the eighth edition of the renewed Backyard Brawl and punishing the Tigers 56-27 in San Antonio.

The Majors captured their third consecutive SCAC championship, winning outright to earn the program's third NCAA tournament berth, became the first team in the program's history to reach double digit wins and climbed to their highest ever national ranking, #3, before finishing the season 11-1 and ranked #12 nationally.

Once again, DuBose was named the conference's "Coach of the Year" and senior quarterback Juan Joseph was the SCAC's "Offensive Player of the Year" for the third consecutive season. Sophomore wide receiver and return specialist Michael Galatas was named the conference's "Special Teams Player of the Year" and freshman running back Shane Bowser was the SCAC's co-"Newcomer of the Year." In all, 20 Majors were named to the All-SCAC first team, second team and honorable mention lists.

== Schedule ==
Date	Time	Opponent	Rank	Site	Result	Attendance
September 6	7:00 pm	No. 25 Mississippi College*		Harper Davis Field; Jackson, MS (rivalry)	W 42–6	4,178
September 13	7:00 pm	at Belhaven*	No. 24	H. T. Newell Field; Jackson, MS (Riverside Rumble)	W 34–14	2,150
September 20	1:00 pm	Austin	No. 22	Harper Davis Field; Jackson, MS	W 41–7	1,012
September 27	1:00 pm	at Rhodes	No. 19	Fargason Field; Memphis, TN	W 49–2	1,111
October 4	1:00 pm	DePauw	No. 13	Harper Davis Field; Jackson, MS	W 55–13	955
October 11	12:30 pm	at Centre	No. 12	Farris Stadium; Danville, KY	W 46–26	1,000
October 18	1:00 pm	Sewanee	No. 12	Harper Davis Field; Jackson, MS	W 38–17	620
November 1	1:30 pm	at No. 14 Trinity (TX)	No. 5	E. M. Stevens Stadium; San Antonio, TX	W 56–27	3,213
November 8	1:00 pm	Colorado College^{†}	No. 4	Harper Davis Field; Jackson, MS	W 50–6	2,731
November 15	12:00 pm	at Birmingham–Southern*	No. 4	Panther Stadium; Birmingham, AL	W 31–14	1,696
November 22	12:00 pm	LaGrange*	No. 3	Harper Davis Field; Jackson, MS (NCAA Division III First Round)	W 51–26	1,044
November 29	12:00 pm	No. 19 Washington & Jefferson*	No. 3	Harper Davis Field; Jackson, MS (NCAA Division III Second Round)	L 20–35	857
*Non-conference game; ^{†}Homecoming; Rankings from D3football.com Poll released prior to the game; All times are in Central time
