= 2007 Trinity vs. Millsaps football game =

Coordinates: 32°19′25.5″N 90°10′50.9″W

"The Mississippi Miracle"
- Beginning of the play
Trinity Tigers	Millsaps Majors
(6–1)	(6–1)
28	24
Head coach: Steve Mohr	Head coach: Mike DuBose
AP 19	AP 24
	1	2	3	4	Total
Trinity	7	3	3	15	28
Millsaps	7	0	7	10	24
- Date: October 27, 2007
- Season: 2007
- Stadium: Harper Davis Field
- Location: Jackson, Mississippi

The 2007 Trinity vs. Millsaps football game is best known for the memorable walk-off touchdown play that occurred in the game's last two seconds. On October 27, 2007, the NCAA Division III 19th-ranked Trinity University Tigers threw 15 lateral passes and scored a 61-yard touchdown to win a game against the 24th-ranked Millsaps College Majors as time expired in the game. Media sources called the play the "Mississippi Miracle" or "Lateralpalooza." ESPN and other sources said the play was probably "the longest play in college football history" in terms of how much time the play took to complete (over one minute). On January 7, 2008, the final play of the game was named the Pontiac Game Changing performance of the year.

== Background ==
Millsaps brought a 5–0 conference mark into the game, Trinity a 3–1 conference record, essentially turning the regular season contest into a play-in game with the Southern Collegiate Athletic Conference's automatic playoff bid on the line. A Millsaps win would secure the playoff berth for the Majors; a Trinity victory would give them control of their own destiny—if they could win their remaining conference games Millsaps would be unable to overtake them.

Coming into the game, Trinity was ranked #19 in the country, while Millsaps was ranked #24 according to the D3football.com poll, despite the Majors one game lead in the conference standings. The previous year, Millsaps had ended Trinity's streak of 13 straight SCAC titles with a 34–12 upset over the Tigers on the same field to clinch the 2006 SCAC crown.

== Game summary ==
Trinity's players take the field

Trinity got the ball to start the game and used four plays, culminating in a 25-yard run by Chris Baer, to score a touchdown. Millsaps was unable to get a first down and they punted back to Trinity. On the punt, Trinity's Caleb Urban fumbled the ball and Eric McCarty of the Majors recovered at the Trinity 40-yard line. The Tigers defense prevented the Majors from reaching the end zone so the Majors attempted a field goal, which was no good. The Tigers punted on their next possession and then Majors quarterback Juan Joseph's pass was intercepted by Lee Patterson at the Trinity 4-yard line. The Tigers also ended their drive when Blake Barmore's pass was intercepted by Ray Kline. Millsaps took over at the Trinity 20-yard line and four plays later scored a touchdown on a 12-yard pass from Joseph to Louis Conley. A punt by each team left Trinity with the ball and the score was tied at 7 at the end of the first quarter.

In the second quarter, Trinity held the Majors scoreless and made a field goal to take a 10–7 lead into halftime. The third quarter brought a field goal by the Tigers and a touchdown by the Majors. The score was 14–13 Millsaps coming into the final quarter.

Millsaps widened their lead with a 9-play 44-yard touchdown scoring drive that used 3:03 of game time. That gave them a 21–13 lead. The Tigers trimmed the lead to 21–16 with a 22-yard field goal by Peter Licalzi. The Majors answered with their own field goal to make it 24–16. Trinity drove to the Millsaps 13-yard line. On fourth down, Blake Barmore completed a pass to Riley Curry for 13 yards for a touchdown, making it 24–22. The Tigers tried to tie the game with a two-point conversion but Blake Barmore's pass attempt failed and Trinity had to kick the ball to Millsaps.

Leading 24–22, Millsaps got the ball at the Trinity 43-yard line with 2:03 left in the game. They ran four straight rushing plays but were unable to run out the clock. On fourth-and-two with eight seconds left, Millsaps backup quarterback Burt Pereira ran to his left in an attempt to run out the clock; however, he went down with two seconds left, which gave Trinity possession of the ball and one final play in which to score.

Scoring summary

Quarter	Time	Drive			Team	Scoring information	Score	
Quarter	Time	Plays	Yards	TOP	Team	Scoring information	Trinity	Millsaps
1	13:10	4	54	1:50	Trinity	Chris Baer 25-yard touchdown run, Peter Licalzi kick good	7	0
1	04:24	4	20	1:04	Millsaps	Louis Conley 12-yard touchdown reception from Juan Joseph, Taylor Russolino kick good	7	7
2	11:42	10	32	3:51	Trinity	39-yard field goal by Peter Licalzi	10	7
3	14:41	1	52	0:09	Millsaps	Eric McCarty 52-yard touchdown reception from Juan Joseph, Taylor Russolino kick good	10	14
3	08:42	13	81	5:56	Trinity	28-yard field goal by Peter Licalzi	13	14
4	11:57	9	44	3:03	Millsaps	Raymece Savage 3-yard touchdown reception from Juan Joseph, Taylor Russolino kick good	13	21
4	10:45	5	75	1:12	Trinity	22-yard field goal by Peter Licalzi	16	21
4	04:20	4	5	1:43	Millsaps	33-yard field goal by Sam Herman	16	24
4	02:11	12	72	2:03	Trinity	Riley Curry 13-yard touchdown reception from Blake Barmore, 2-point pass no good	22	24
4	00:00	1	60	0:02	Trinity	Blake Barmore pass complete to Shawn Thompson for 16 yards; Riley Curry 44-yard touchdown return	28	24
"TOP" = time of possession. For other American football terms, see Glossary of American football.							28	24

== Final play ==
Trinity WR Riley Curry pursued by LB Shawn Gillenwater of Millsaps.

The Tigers had time for only one snap so there was no time to move into field goal range. They needed to score a touchdown in one play, working from their own 40-yard line. Believing that 60 yards was too far away to complete a Hail Mary pass, Trinity coach Steve Mohr called for a 10-15 yard underneath route. The play they ran involved seven players and 15 laterals. The players who touched the ball for Trinity were (in order, number of touches in parentheses):

- #13 Blake Barmore, quarterback (2)
- #80 Shawn Thompson, wide receiver (3)
- #7 Riley Curry, wide receiver (4)
- #50 Josh Hooten, Offensive lineman (2)
- #3 Michael Tomlin, wide receiver (2)
- #68 Stephen Arnold, Offensive lineman (1)
- #25 Brandon Maddux, wide receiver (3)

Here is the sequence of the play, broken down for every time the ball changed hands:

- The Pass (Barmore-Thompson)
  - With the ball spotted just inside the Tigers' own 40-yard line, Trinity Quarterback Blake Barmore (#13) took the snap out of a 5-wide shotgun set, stepped up in the pocket and completed a pass over the middle to Tigers' Wide receiver Shawn Thompson (#80) at Millsaps' 49-yard line.
- Lateral #1 (Thompson-Curry)
  - Thompson (#80) cut back to his right and reached the Majors' 44, then turned around and, just as he was hit by two Millsaps defenders, tossed the ball to Wide Receiver Riley Curry (#7) who was just a few feet away, on the Majors' 47.
- Lateral #2 (Curry-Hooten)
  - Curry (#7) advanced to the Millsaps 43-yard line, near the Trinity sideline. Staving off a would-be tackle by Millsaps safety Ray Kline (#1) with his left arm, Curry leapt and tossed the ball backwards with his right. It was caught by offensive lineman Josh Hooten (#50).
- Lateral #3 (Hooten-Tomlin)
  - Without looking, Hooten (#50) immediately flipped the ball over his head to Wide Receiver Michael Tomlin (#3), who caught it around the Millsaps 47.
- Lateral #4 (Tomlin-Arnold)
  - Tomlin (#3) started to his left, but had to pitch the ball immediately. Just before being hit hard by Millsaps defensive lineman Casey Younger (#90), he made an underhanded toss to Tigers offensive lineman Stephen Arnold (#68), who was right behind him.
- Lateral #5 (Arnold-Thompson)
  - Arnold (#68) immediately turned around and pitched the ball to Thompson (#80), who caught the ball in stride around Trinity's 48.
- Lateral #6 (Thompson-Maddux)
  - Thompson (#80) sprinted left, back towards the middle of the field, but was not able to make any forward progress. He made a quick pitch to wide receiver Brandon Maddux (#25), who was sprinting back to the right, just before being hit by Millsaps linebacker Ronnie Wheat (#14).
- Lateral #7 (Maddux-Curry)
  - Maddux (#25) avoided a would-be tackle by Millsaps defensive lineman Cedric Lawrence (#13), ran right, back towards the Trinity sideline, and was able to turn up and advance to the Majors' 43. With Millsaps linebacker Shawn Gillenwater (#50) closing in, Maddux turned around and passed the ball back to Curry (#7) who was waiting back at the Tigers' 48-yard line.
- Lateral #8 (Curry-Maddux)
  - Curry (#7) was quickly pinned against the Trinity sideline near midfield, by Millsaps defenders Younger (#90), Gillenwater (#50), and defensive lineman Denarold Anderson (#62). He jumped and threw the ball back to Maddux (#25), who had worked his way back near the Trinity 45-yard line, just before being forced out of bounds.
- Lateral #9 (Maddux-Barmore)
  - Maddux (#25) caught the ball around Trinity's own 45, near the Tigers' sideline. With Gillenwater (#50) and Millsaps defensive back Michael Sims (#35) closing quickly, Maddux turned and passed the ball laterally across the field to Barmore (#13), who caught it in stride at Trinity's 42.
- Lateral #10 (Barmore-Thompson II)
  - Barmore (#13) took the pass and sprinted all the way down near the Major's 30, then flipped the ball back to Shawn Thompson (#80), before being tackled by Kline (#1)
- Lateral #11 (Thompson-Curry II)
  - Thompson (#80) caught the ball around the Majors' 35, on the numbers near the Millsaps sideline. He made it inside the Majors' 30, turned and threw a pass to his right before being brought down by Millsaps defensive back Jonathan Brooks (#31).
- Lateral #12 (Curry-Tomlin)
  - Curry (#7) caught the ball in stride at the Majors' 36. He started to his left, then turned and retreated behind the Millsaps 40 and back to his right to avoid Millsaps linebacker Wheat (#14). He then cut up inside the Millsaps 40 to avoid Anderson (#62) and pitched the ball back towards midfield just as he was hit by Sims (#35).
- Lateral #13 (Tomlin-Hooten)
  - Michael Tomlin (#3) caught the pitch at the Majors' 41-yard line in the middle of the field with no defenders near him. He raced back to the right side of the field, near the Majors' 30, where he flipped the ball back over his head with one hand before being brought down by Kline (#1).
- Lateral #14 (Hooten-Maddux)
  - Josh Hooten (#50) caught the ball and immediately pitched it to Maddux (#25) who was waiting on the Majors' 31, near the Trinity sideline.
- Lateral #15, Fumble, Score (Maddux-Curry II)
  - With Millsaps lineman Younger (#90) closing in, Maddux (#25) attempted a backwards pass that was nearly batted down by Younger (#90), but bounced off the turf near the Majors' 35 and into the hands of Curry (#7), who took the ball in stride in the middle of the field, picked up a block, and raced past the last Millsaps defender for the score and the win.

NCAA statistical guidelines state that the yardage on a play with multiple laterals goes to the ball carrier who had the ball the longest, or the player scoring a touchdown. This is done to simplify things for the official scorer, as opposed to having to record each independent lateral. As a result, the play-by-play record of the game officially records the play as "Blake Barmore pass complete to Shawn Thompson for 16 yards to the MSPS44, Riley Curry for 44 yards to the MSPS0, 1ST DOWN TRINITY, TOUCHDOWN, clock 00:00."

In the video, it is clear that several Millsaps defenders stopped playing before the play was over. On the thirteenth lateral, Tomlin was taken down but tossed a no-look pitch over his shoulder to Hooten just before his knee hit the ground. Many Millsaps fans believed the play to be over and fireworks were shot off from behind the endzone in celebration. Maddux's final lateral hit the ground and bounced into Curry's hands. It appeared as though two defenders near Curry believed the play was over at that point, and Curry scampered into the endzone untouched. Millsaps safety Michael Sims, the closest player to Curry when Curry caught the last lateral, later admitted that he turned around and started walking away, believing the game to be over.

The play took more than a minute of real-time to conclude and analysts have said it is the longest or possibly the longest play in college football history. ESPN said the play took 62 seconds and reports may be the longest play in college football history. The Frederick News Post said the play took 63 seconds and they also stated "it might very well be the longest play in college history." NBC said "If this wasn't the most memorable game-ending play in college football history, it likely was the longest play -- by a multiple of two -- in the game's history." SouthernCollegeSports.com called it the longest play and commented "Perhaps the most amazing thing about this longest play ever is the fact that not a single flag was thrown for a rules infraction."

The San Antonio Express-News, San Antonio's WOAI, MSNBC, CBS Sports and The Dallas Morning News called the play the "Mississippi Miracle". The Dallas Morning News, Sports Illustrated, and ESPN used the term "Lateralpalooza".

== Broadcast ==
The announcing crew for the game consisted of a five-person team with only one video camera. Jonathan Wiener, a Trinity sophomore English major from Jackson, Mississippi, had the play-by-play. Justin Thompson, (brother of Shawn Thompson, one of the play participants) of New Braunfels, Texas, was the color analyst. Bill Swint of New Braunfels, Texas, ran the video camera assisted by Butch Maddux of China Spring, Texas. The video and audio feeds were mixed and uploaded live to a streaming videocast server by Bob Edwards of Dallas, Texas. The game was broadcast live on the internet but was not otherwise televised. According to The New York Times, "Wiener kept his cool through the frenzy and described most of the details precisely as they occurred. The replay of the video with Wiener’s description has been shown on national television and has become a hit on the Internet."

As Curry scored the touchdown, Wiener shouted, "Curry scores! The game is over! The Tigers lateraled it and kept lateraling!! And the game is over! The Tigers win! The Tigers win!"

== Analysis ==
With the win, the Trinity Tigers remained in contention for the Southern Collegiate Athletic Conference (SCAC) championship as well as an automatic berth into the NCAA Division III playoffs. Millsaps would have secured a spot in the playoffs had they won. Trinity won the championship for 2007, receiving a playoff berth but was ultimately eliminated in the first round by the University of Mary Hardin–Baylor.

Sports analysts compared the ending to The Play, the last-second, five-lateral kickoff return during a college football game between the University of California, Berkeley Golden Bears and the Stanford University Cardinal on November 20, 1982. Jake Curtis of the San Francisco Chronicle said that the Trinity play made the play by California "look like conservative play-calling." Joe LaPointe of The New York Times called the broadcast of the play "The laterals heard round the world." The San Antonio Express-News ran a byline calling it "'The most sensational, incredible ending in all of Division III' and then some". Mike Christensen of The Clarion-Ledger, the hometown newspaper of Millsaps, called it "one of those you-had-to-see-it-to-believe-it plays". David Chancellor of San Antonio's WOAI called it "one of the greatest plays in sports history".

ESPN reported, "In the digital age, even D-III games can go global in a flash. And so a slice of fame normally reserved for the semiprofessionals at the big-dollar Division I programs was bestowed upon the Tigers. That night they gathered in the lobby of their hotel near the Millsaps campus to watch, in disbelief, as they made SportsCenter."

== See also ==
- River City Relay, a similar last-second play in a 2003 National Football League game
- List of historically significant college football games
- The Play (American football), a similar play undertaken in the 1982 University of California vs. Stanford University game.
- Music City Miracle, the ending to the 1999 AFC wild card game between the Buffalo Bills and Tennessee Titans.
- List of nicknamed college football games and plays
