= Steve Mohr =

American football player and coach

Biographical details
- Born: c. 1954

Playing career
- 1972–1975: Denison
- Positions: Offensive tackle, tight end

Coaching career (HC unless noted)
- 1976: Findlay (GA)
- 1977–1984: Findlay (OC)
- 1985–1989: Ithaca (OL)
- 1990–2013: Trinity (TX)

Head coaching record
- Overall: 186–74
- Tournaments: 12–12 (NCAA D-III playoffs)

Accomplishments and honors

Championships
- 15 SCAC (1993–2005, 2007, 2011)

Steve Mohr (born c. 1954) is an American retired college football coach. He served as the head football coach at Trinity University in San Antonio from 1990 to 2013, compiling a record of 186–74.

Mohr played college football at Denison University in Granville, Ohio, starting for four seasons at offensive tackle and tight end before graduating in 1976. He began his coaching career in 1976 as a graduate assistant at Findlay College—now known as the University of Findlay—in Findlay, Ohio. Mohr earned a master's degree from Bowling Green State University in 1977 and was promoted that year to Findlay's offensive coordinator, a position he held through the 1984 season. He spent five seasons, from 1985 to 1989, as the offensive line coach at Ithaca College in Ithaca, New York, before he was hired by Trinity in April 1990.

== Head coaching record ==
Year	Team	Overall	Conference	Standing	Bowl/playoffs	D3^{#}
Trinity Tigers (Collegiate Athletic Conference / Southern Collegiate Athletic Conference) (1990–2011)
1990	Trinity	1–9	0–4	5th		
1991	Trinity	1–9	0–4	5th		
1992	Trinity	2–8	0–4	5th		
1993	Trinity	6–4	4–0	1st		
1994	Trinity	10–1	4–0	1st	L NCAA Division III First Round	
1995	Trinity	6–3	3–1	T–1st		
1996	Trinity	9–1	3–1	T–1st		
1997	Trinity	10–1	4–0	1st	L NCAA Division III Quarterfinal	
1998	Trinity	12–1	6–0	1st	L NCAA Division III Semifinal	
1999	Trinity	12–1	6–0	1st	L NCAA Division III Semifinal	
2000	Trinity	10–3	4–2	T–1st	L NCAA Division III Quarterfinal	
2001	Trinity	9–2	6–0	1st	L NCAA Division III Second Round	
2002	Trinity	14–1	6–0	1st	L NCAA Division III Championship	
2003	Trinity	8–3	5–1	T–1st	L NCAA Division III First Round	25
2004	Trinity	9–2	6–0	1st	L NCAA Division III First Round	14
2005	Trinity	9–1	5–0	1st	L NCAA Division III First Round	19
2006	Trinity	8–2	5–1	2nd		
2007	Trinity	9–2	6–1	T–1st	L NCAA Division III First Round	16
2008	Trinity	8–2	5–2	T–2nd		
2009	Trinity	7–3	4–2	T–3rd		
2010	Trinity	4–6	2–4	T–5th		
2011	Trinity	10–1	6–0	1st	L NCAA Division III First Round	17
Trinity Tigers (NCAA Division III independent) (2012)
2012	Trinity	7–3				
Trinity Tigers (Southern Collegiate Athletic Conference) (2013)
2013	Trinity	5–5	1–2	3rd		
Trinity:		186–74	91–29			
Total:		186–74				
National championship Conference title Conference division title or championship game berth
