= Mike DuBose =

American football player and coach (born 1953)

Biographical details
- Born: January 5, 1953 (age 73); Opp, Alabama, U.S.

Playing career
- 1971–1974: Alabama
- Position: Defensive lineman

Coaching career (HC unless noted)
- 1975: Alabama (GA)
- 1976–1977: Fairhope HS (AL) (assistant)
- 1978–1979: Prattville HS (AL)
- 1980–1981: Chattanooga (DL)
- 1982: Southern Miss (DL)
- 1983–1986: Alabama (DL)
- 1987–1989: Tampa Bay Buccaneers (DL)
- 1990–1995: Alabama (DL)
- 1996: Alabama (DC/DL)
- 1997–2000: Alabama
- 2002: Northview HS (AL)
- 2003–2004: Luverne HS (AL)
- 2005: Millsaps (DC)
- 2006–2009: Millsaps
- 2010–2011: Memphis (DL)
- 2013–2014: Luverne HS (AL)
- 2015–2017: Opp HS (AL) (LB)
- 2019–2020: Opp HS (AL) (DC)
- 2021–2022: Opp HS (AL)

Head coaching record
- Overall: 57–33 (college); 56–38 (high school)
- Bowls: 0–2
- Tournaments: 1–2 (NCAA D-III playoffs)

Accomplishments and honors

Championships
- As coach: SEC (1999); 4 SCAC (2006–2009); As player: National (1973)

Awards
- SEC Coach of the Year (1999); SCAC Coach of the Year (2006, 2008); 2× Second-team All-SEC (1973, 1974)

Michael Lynn DuBose (born January 5, 1953) is an American football coach, most recently serving for Opp High School in Opp, Alabama. His most recent college coaching experience was serving as defensive line coach for the University of Memphis. DuBose came to Memphis from Millsaps College, where he was the Majors' head coach from 2006 to 2009. He resurrected the school's struggling football program by winning outright or sharing a conference title in each of his four seasons there. DuBose is best known for his four-year stint as the head football coach at his alma mater, the University of Alabama, where he led the Crimson Tide to an SEC championship in 1999.

Prior to coaching, DuBose played for Alabama under coach Paul "Bear" Bryant, where he was a teammate of other noted players such as John and Charley Hannah and Sylvester Croom and was a part of the Crimson Tide's 1973 national championship team.

== Playing career ==
DuBose was born in Opp, Alabama. He earned four varsity letters as an athlete at Opp High School, before going to the University of Alabama, where he played for the Crimson Tide on the defensive line under head coach Bear Bryant from 1972 to 1974. The highlight of DuBose's career was a performance against the Tennessee Volunteers in which he caused a fumble, had twenty tackles, and was named SEC Defensive Lineman of the Week. His career totals included 129 total tackles, eight forced fumbles, and six fumble recoveries.

== Coaching career ==
=== Early coaching career ===
DuBose's coaching career began as a graduate assistant with the Crimson Tide in 1975.

==== High school coaching career ====
DuBose was an assistant coach in 1976 and 1977 at Fairhope High School in Alabama. In 1978 and 1979, he was the head coach as well as athletic director of Prattville High School in Prattville, Alabama.

==== Assistant coaching in college and pros ====
DuBose began his collegiate coaching career as a defensive line coach at the University of Tennessee at Chattanooga in 1980. After two years at UTC, he was offered a job on the staff at Southern Mississippi. DuBose wanted to reject the job offer in hopes of working for Bear Bryant at Alabama, but Bryant told DuBose to go for one year and he'd get a call for a new job the following year (see Ivan Maisel, War In Dixie). DuBose went to USM and was the defensive line coach. He was on the opposite sideline of the game that ended Alabama's then college record 57-game home unbeaten streak in November 1982. Two months later, Bryant died, and DuBose was invited to Alabama as a defensive line coach on the staff of new coach Ray Perkins. He coached the defensive line for four years and followed Perkins to the Tampa Bay Buccaneers for three years, 1987–1989. He returned to Alabama as the defensive line coach under Gene Stallings from 1990 to 1996, including the Crimson Tide's national championship season in 1992. He was promoted to defensive coordinator in 1996.

=== Alabama ===
On December 9, 1996, sixteen days after Stallings announced his retirement, DuBose was named as head coach of Alabama.

==== Slow start ====
In 1997, DuBose's first season at Alabama, the Crimson Tide won its first two games. However, they soon began feeling the strain of the loss of 30 scholarships as a result of NCAA violations from the Stallings era. They lost seven of the last nine games, including their first loss to Kentucky since 1922, blowout losses at the hands of Tennessee and LSU, and a loss to Louisiana Tech. The 1997 Iron Bowl presented DuBose an opportunity to salvage at least a piece of a lost season, but Alabama lost after leading the game 17–15 with less than a minute to go. Faced with a third and a long one and the prospect of having to punt the ball to Auburn if they did not convert, leaving Auburn an opportunity to get into field goal range, the Tide ran a screen pass, resulting in a fumble and Auburn recovery that led to the game-winning field goal for the Tigers. Much controversy surrounded the apparent fact that DuBose not only didn't call the play, but didn't know what play was being run. DuBose reacted by firing four assistants, including the ones who called the play, Bruce Arians and Woody McCorvey. The Tide finished with the school's worst record since 1957, the year before Bryant arrived.

The following year, 1998, DuBose led the team to a 7–5 record and a berth in the inaugural Music City Bowl against Virginia Tech. The Tide lost with a poor performance on a day with even worse weather, 38–7, and DuBose went back to the drawing board. Nonetheless, DuBose restored much of the goodwill he had lost in his first season with a comeback over LSU in Tiger Stadium, and a win over Auburn in Legion Field, which coincidentally was the last time the Iron Bowl was played at the location.

In May 1999, rumor leaked out on the Internet that DuBose was accused of having an affair with Deborah Gibson, his secretary. DuBose flatly denied the charges, but three months later acknowledged the affair and reached an out-of-court settlement that paid over $300,000 out of his own pocket, removed the final two years of his contract (leaving him without a job after the upcoming 1999 season unless either an extension was granted or a new contract was reached), and gave the administration the chance to fire him at any time they desired.

==== SEC champions ====
After a 2–0 start, Louisiana Tech stunned Alabama again, scoring a touchdown on the last play from scrimmage, a 29-yard pass by Brian Stallworth, who replaced an injured Tim Rattay on the previous play, to win. Calls for DuBose's firing reached a fevered pitch, and the administration responded by firing Athletic Director Bob Bockrath. Rumors persisted that DuBose would be the next to go in the off-week of October 9, 1999, right after the Tide was expected to be routed by the Florida Gators. However, Alabama suddenly took off behind All-American tailback Shaun Alexander and Outland Trophy winner Chris Samuels, who played left tackle. DuBose pulled the team together and beat Arkansas, then beat Florida in a 40–39 overtime game that ended Florida's five-year home winning streak and put Alabama back in the top ten. They went the rest of the regular season losing only to Tennessee, 21–7, and earned the right to meet Florida again for the SEC Championship after a dominating fourth quarter in Jordan–Hare Stadium to beat Auburn. The win over Auburn marked the first time since 1992 that either Alabama or Auburn had won the Iron Bowl in consecutive years, and it was first time Alabama had ever beaten Auburn in Jordan–Hare Stadium.

On December 4, 1999, Alabama and Florida played a rematch at the Georgia Dome in Atlanta. Florida was expected to return the favor of Alabama's October win. The Gators scored in five plays to start the game but never scored the rest of the night. The game was close, 15-7 Alabama, until the early fourth quarter when a broken play ran by Freddie Milons, a wide receiver lined up at quarterback, bolted for a 77-yard touchdown after reversing his field. Two plays later, defensive lineman Reggie Grimes tipped, intercepted, and scored a touchdown on a pass from Jesse Palmer. The final score was Alabama 34, Florida 7.

After the game, the two years removed from DuBose's contract after the Gibson settlement were restored. This angered some Alabama fans and alumni, some of whom believed he should have been fired in the first place. Alabama then faced Michigan in the Orange Bowl where the Tide lost 35–34 on a missed PAT in the first overtime. Alabama ended the year ranked 8th in both major polls, its first top-10 finish in five years.

For the Tide's 10–3 performance, DuBose was named SEC Coach of the Year.

==== 2000 debacle and firing/resignation ====
Alabama came into the 2000 regular season with its highest expectations since the 1992 national championship season. The Tide was ranked third in the country in the pre-season polls and was expected to pick up where it left off in 1999. It had also signed a highly rated recruiting class. The Crimson Tide opened the 2000 season in Pasadena against UCLA, but their national title hopes were quickly shattered in a 35–24 loss. After a win against Vanderbilt the following week, Alabama lost badly to Southern Miss, 21–0. DuBose offered his resignation to Athletic Director Mal Moore after the game, but Moore refused it. After a controversial loss to Arkansas—in which two disputed calls allowed the Razorbacks to continue what would be the game-winning drive—the Tide rebounded to beat South Carolina and Ole Miss to raise its record to 3-3. As it turned out, the 45-7 thumping of Ole Miss was the last game DuBose would win. Things reached a nadir on October 28, 2000, when the Tide lost to underdog Central Florida at home, 40–38. On the Tuesday after the game, it was announced that DuBose had been fired, but would be allowed to finish out the season. The 2000 season ended disastrously. Alabama lost a close contest to LSU in Tiger Stadium, the team's first loss in Baton Rouge in 31 years. They were then dominated in Starkville by Mississippi State and shut out 9-0 by Auburn on a miserable day in which Tuscaloosa had sleet and snow in the first installment of the Iron Bowl played on the Alabama campus since 1901.

Years later, DuBose said that when he was hired at Alabama, he should have talked with Stallings about what he went through as coach and "gleaned from that knowledge"—an oversight that he still regretted. He left Alabama with a record of 24–23 and 16–16 in SEC play. However, the 1999 SEC championship season was his only winning record in SEC play.

After a long coaching search in which Butch Davis, Frank Beamer, Tommy Bowden, and others were considered for the job, Alabama Athletics Director Mal Moore hired Dennis Franchione to replace DuBose.

Unfortunately for Alabama, the effects of the DuBose era would not dissipate so quickly. The NCAA would, shortly thereafter, begin investigating the recruitment of Albert Means, a star defensive lineman recruited out of Memphis, Tennessee. Although DuBose was not implicated in any wrongdoing, Alabama was nevertheless hammered for the violations that occurred on his watch, which included a loss of 21 scholarships over three years, a two-year bowl ban, and five years of probation.

=== After Alabama ===
After a brief respite from coaching, DuBose was hired as head coach of the Northview High School football program in Dothan, Alabama. During his only year there in 2002, the team had an 0-10 record, in the midst of a losing streak that preceded and continued well beyond his tenure.

After leaving Northview, DuBose was named head coach of the Luverne High School football program in Luverne, Alabama, in 2003. During his two seasons at Luverne, 2003 and 2004, he led the Tigers to a 20–7 record and the 2003 state runner-up in the 2-A classification. In the 2-A state championship game at Legion Field, the Tigers lost to Randolph County, who was led to victory on the heels of Ezekiel Knight's 31-yard touchdown run, and 77-yard punt return for a touchdown. Weeks later, Knight would sign a letter of intent to play for Alabama.

=== Millsaps ===
In 2005, DuBose became the defensive coordinator for the Millsaps College Majors. In his first season at Millsaps, the team struggled to a 2–7 record.

After the 2005 season, DuBose became the Majors' head coach.

==== 2006 ====
In his first season as head coach, Millsaps shocked the SCAC by finishing undefeated in conference play and earning the conference's automatic playoff bid for the first time since 1975.

DuBose was named the SCAC's 2006 coach of the year for engineering the Majors' remarkable turn-around. Sophomore quarterback Juan Joseph was named the league's offensive player of the year and Senior wide receiver Chris Jackson was honored as the league's special teams player of the year (and a first team All-American) for his role as the team's return specialist. In all, 20 Majors were named to the All-SCAC first team, second team and honorable mention lists.

==== 2007 ====
In 2007, DuBose's Majors repeated as conference champions, this time sharing the title with Trinity. However, because Trinity defeated Millsaps head-to-head, with the Tigers winning on the game's final play, "The Mississippi Miracle", it was they, not Millsaps, who received the automatic playoff bid reserved for the SCAC champions. Despite the Majors finishing with the program's best win–loss record since 1996, they failed to receive an at-large bid into the playoffs.

As in 2006, the Majors' success on the field was reflected in the 2007 all-conference awards. Junior Quarterback Juan Joseph was the SCAC's offensive player of the year for the second consecutive season, senior defensive tackle Casey Younger was the league's co-defensive player of the year and sophomore return specialist John Milazzo was the SCAC's special teams player of the year. In all, 19 Majors were named to the All-SCAC first team, second team and honorable mention lists.

==== 2008 ====
The 2008 season was DuBose's best at Millsaps. His veteran squad finished the season 11–1 after an undefeated regular season and captured a third consecutive SCAC crown. Prior to the team's season-ending playoff loss to Washington & Jefferson, the 2008 Majors won every game they played by 17 or more points, with just one team completing a game within 20 points of Millsaps. The team climbed to their highest national ranking ever, #3, before finishing the season ranked #12.

Once again, DuBose was named the conference's coach of the year and senior quarterback Juan Joseph was the SCAC's offensive player of the year for the third consecutive season. Sophomore wide receiver and return specialist Michael Galatas was named the conference's special teams player of the year and freshman running back Shane Bowser was the SCAC's co-newcomer of the year. In all, 20 Majors were named to the All-SCAC first team, second team and honorable mention lists.

==== 2009 ====
In 2009, Millsaps again earned a share of the SCAC championship, giving DuBose and the Majors four conferences titles in as many years.

Junior return specialist Michael Galatas was named the SCAC's Special Teams Player of the Year for the second consecutive season, the fourth consecutive season the award went to a Millsaps player, and junior linebacker Will Hawkins was the conference's Defensive Player of the Year, and a first team All-American. A total of 20 Majors were voted to the all-conference first, second and honorable mention teams.

In December, DuBose announced he was leaving Millsaps to join new Memphis coach Larry Porter's staff. DuBose's tenure ended with 33 victories in four seasons, prior to which the Majors won just 37 games in the 10 years, and DuBose's four conference championships came after the Majors had won only two since joining the SCAC in 1989. Through 43 games, DuBose's teams scored more than 37 points per game and allowed just over 17 points per game. DuBose's .767 winning percentage is the highest of any coach in the school's history and only Harper Davis, who led Millsaps football for a quarter century from 1964 to 1988, won more games as the Majors' head coach.

=== Memphis ===
In December 2009, Mike DuBose was hired by head football coach Larry Porter to be the defensive line coach at the University of Memphis. In November 2011, Larry Porter was fired after a 3–21 record in his two seasons as head coach.

=== Luverne High School ===
DuBose returned to Luverne High School as head coach in 2013. In a 2013 AL.com article, he stated that he enjoys high school coaching the most of any level at which he has coached. Under DuBose's leadership, Luverne went 11–2 during the 2013 season. DuBose resigned on February 12, 2015, to accept a job coaching linebackers at his alma mater, Opp High School.

=== Opp High School ===
In 2021 DuBose was hired as the head coach at Opp High School replacing Brent Hill. Dubose led the Bobcats to a 17–6 record in his two seasons at Opp including two playoff appearances. On December 2, 2022, Dubose retired from coaching to spend more time with family.

== Head coaching record ==
=== College ===
Year	Team	Overall	Conference	Standing	Bowl/playoffs	Coaches^{#}	AP^{°}
Alabama Crimson Tide (Southeastern Conference) (1997–2000)
1997	Alabama	4–7	2–6	5th (West)			
1998	Alabama	7–5	4–4	T–3rd (West)	L Music City		
1999	Alabama	10–3	7–1	1st (West)	L Orange^{†}	8	8
2000	Alabama	3–8	3–5	T–5th (West)			
Alabama:		24–23	16–16				
Millsaps Majors (Southern Collegiate Athletic Conference) (2006–2009)
2006	Millsaps	7–4	6–0	1st	L NCAA Division III First Round		
2007	Millsaps	8–2	6–1	T–1st			
2008	Millsaps	11–1	7–0	1st	L NCAA Division III Second Round	12	
2009	Millsaps	7–3	5–1	T–1st			
Millsaps:		33–10	24–2				
Total:		57–33					
National championship Conference title Conference division title or championship game berth
^{†}Indicates BCS bowl.; ^{#}Rankings from final Coaches Poll.; ^{°}Rankings from final AP Poll.

== Personal life ==
DuBose is married to the former Polly Martin of Opp, Alabama. They have two children, a son and a daughter.
