= Centenary Institute (disambiguation) =

Centenary Institute is a medical research centre in Sydney, Australia.

Centenary Institute may also refer to:

- Centenary Institute (Alabama), former college in Summerfield, Alabama
- Morgan State University, formerly the Centenary Biblical Institute

== See also ==
- Centenary College (disambiguation)
- Centenary University
