= 2009 NCAA Division III football season =

American college football season

- Regular season: August – November 2009
- Playoffs: November – December 2009
- National championship: Salem Football Stadium; Salem, VA
- Champion: Wisconsin–Whitewater (2)
- Gagliardi Trophy: Blaine Westemeyer (OT), Augustana (IL)

The 2009 NCAA Division III football season, part of the college football season organized by the NCAA at the Division III level in the United States, began in August 2009, and concluded with the NCAA Division III Football Championship, also known as the Stagg Bowl, in December 2009 at Salem Football Stadium in Salem, Virginia. The Wisconsin–Whitewater Warhawks won their second Division III championship by defeating the Mount Union Purple Raiders, 38−28. This was the fifth of seven straight championship games between Mount Union (3 wins) and Wisconsin–Whitewater (4 wins).

The Gagliardi Trophy, given to the most outstanding player in Division III football, was awarded to Blaine Westemeyer, offensive tackle from Augustana (IL).

== Conference changes and new programs ==
School	2008 conference	2009 conference
Blackburn	SLIAC	Program dropped
Colorado College	SCAC	Program dropped
Principia	UMAC	Program dropped

== Conference standings ==
2009 American Southwest Conference football standings
	Conf.			Overall
Team	W		L	W		L
No. 7 Mary Hardin–Baylor +^	7	–	1	10	–	2
No. 20 Mississippi College +^	7	–	1	9	–	3
Louisiana College	6	–	2	7	–	3
Hardin–Simmons	5	–	3	6	–	4
McMurry	4	–	4	4	–	6
East Texas Baptist	3	–	5	3	–	7
Howard Payne	2	–	6	4	–	6
Sul Ross	2	–	6	2	–	8
Texas Lutheran	0	–	8	0	–	10
+ – Conference co-champions; ^ – NCAA Division III playoff participant; Rankings from D3football.com

2009 Atlantic Central Football Conference standings
	Conf.			Overall
Team	W		L	W		L
No. 4 Wesley $^	3	–	0	13	–	1
Salisbury	2	–	1	5	–	6
Frostburg State	1	–	2	1	–	9
Apprentice §	0	–	3	1	–	9
$ – Conference champion; ^ – NCAA Division III playoff participant; § – Not an NCAA member; Rankings from D3football.com

2009 Centennial Conference football standings
	Conf.			Overall
Team	W		L	W		L
No. 11 Johns Hopkins $^	7	–	1	10	–	3
Franklin & Marshall	6	–	2	9	–	2
Dickinson	6	–	2	8	–	2
Ursinus	6	–	2	6	–	5
McDaniel	3	–	5	5	–	5
Gettysburg	3	–	5	3	–	7
Muhlenberg	2	–	6	3	–	7
Moravian	2	–	6	2	–	8
Juniata	1	–	7	1	–	9
$ – Conference champion; ^ – NCAA Division III playoff participant; Rankings from D3football.com

2009 College Conference of Illinois and Wisconsin football standings
	Conf.			Overall
Team	W		L	W		L
No. 9 Illinois Wesleyan +^	6	–	1	10	–	2
No. 21 North Central (IL) +	6	–	1	8	–	2
Carthage	4	–	3	7	–	3
Wheaton (IL)	4	–	3	7	–	3
Augustana (IL)	4	–	3	6	–	4
Millikin	3	–	4	6	–	4
Elmhurst	1	–	6	4	–	6
North Park	0	–	7	1	–	9
+ – Conference co-champions; ^ – NCAA Division III playoff participant; Rankings from D3football.com

2009 Eastern Collegiate Football Conference standings
	Conf.			Overall
Team	W		L	W		L
Norwich $	6	–	0	8	–	3
Gallaudet	4	–	2	6	–	4
Mount Ida	4	–	2	4	–	7
Maritime	3	–	3	6	–	4
Husson	3	–	3	4	–	5
Castleton	1	–	5	3	–	6
Becker	0	–	6	0	–	10
$ – Conference champion

2009 Empire 8 Athletic Conference football standings
	Conf.			Overall
Team	W		L	W		L
Alfred +^	4	–	1	8	–	2
St. John Fisher +	4	–	1	7	–	3
Springfield	3	–	2	8	–	2
Ithaca	3	–	2	7	–	3
Hartwick	1	–	4	5	–	5
Utica	0	–	5	4	–	6
+ – Conference co-champions; ^ – NCAA Division III playoff participant

2009 Heartland Collegiate Athletic Conference football standings
	Conf.			Overall
Team	W		L	W		L
Mount St. Joseph $^	7	–	0	9	–	2
Franklin (IN)	5	–	2	7	–	3
Manchester	5	–	2	5	–	5
Rose-Hulman	4	–	3	6	–	4
Defiance	3	–	4	4	–	6
Hanover	3	–	4	3	–	7
Anderson (IN)	1	–	6	1	–	9
Bluffton	0	–	7	0	–	10
$ – Conference champion; ^ – NCAA Division III playoff participant

2009 Iowa Intercollegiate Athletic Conference football standings
	Conf.			Overall
Team	W		L	W		L
No. 8 Central (IA) $^	8	–	0	10	–	1
No. 10 Coe ^	7	–	1	10	–	2
Wartburg	5	–	3	6	–	4
Dubuque	4	–	4	5	–	5
Luther	4	–	4	5	–	5
Buena Vista	3	–	5	4	–	6
Simpson (IA)	2	–	6	3	–	7
Loras	2	–	6	2	–	8
Cornell (IA)	1	–	7	2	–	8
$ – Conference champion; ^ – NCAA Division III playoff participant; Rankings from D3football.com

2009 Liberty League football standings
	Conf.			Overall
Team	W		L	W		L
Susquehanna +^	6	–	1	8	–	3
Union (NY) +	6	–	1	8	–	3
Hobart	5	–	2	6	–	3
Rochester (NY)	4	–	3	4	–	6
RPI	3	–	4	5	–	4
Merchant Marine	2	–	5	4	–	6
St. Lawrence	2	–	5	3	–	7
WPI	0	–	7	3	–	7
+ – Conference co-champions; ^ – NCAA Division III playoff participant

2009 Michigan Intercollegiate Athletic Association football standings
	Conf.			Overall
Team	W		L	W		L
No. 17 Trine $^	6	–	0	10	–	2
Adrian	4	–	2	6	–	4
Albion	4	–	2	4	–	6
Alma	3	–	3	5	–	5
Hope	3	–	3	3	–	7
Kalamazoo	1	–	5	4	–	6
Olivet	0	–	6	0	–	10
$ – Conference champion; ^ – NCAA Division III playoff participant; Rankings from D3football.com

2009 Middle Atlantic Conference football standings
	Conf.			Overall
Team	W		L	W		L
No. 16 Delaware Valley $^	7	–	0	10	–	2
No. 15 Albright ^	6	–	1	11	–	2
Lebanon Valley	5	–	2	9	–	2
Wilkes	3	–	4	6	–	5
Lycoming	3	–	4	4	–	6
King's	2	–	5	3	–	7
Widener	1	–	6	3	–	7
FDU Florham	1	–	6	2	–	8
$ – Conference champion; ^ – NCAA Division III playoff participant; Rankings from D3football.com

2009 Midwest Conference football standings
	Conf.			Overall
Team	W		L	W		L
No. 18 Monmouth (IL) $^	9	–	0	10	–	1
St. Norbert	8	–	1	9	–	1
Ripon	7	–	2	7	–	3
Beloit	5	–	4	6	–	4
Carroll (WI)	5	–	4	5	–	5
Illinois College	5	–	4	5	–	5
Grinnell	2	–	7	2	–	8
Lake Forest	2	–	7	2	–	8
Lawrence	1	–	8	2	–	8
Knox	1	–	8	1	–	9
$ – Conference champion; ^ – NCAA Division III playoff participant; Rankings from D3football.com

2009 Minnesota Intercollegiate Athletic Conference football standings
	Conf.			Overall
Team	W		L	W		L
No. 12 Saint John's (MN) $^	8	–	0	10	–	1
No. 5 St. Thomas (MN) ^	7	–	1	11	–	2
Bethel (MN)	6	–	2	7	–	3
Concordia–Moorhead	3	–	5	5	–	5
St. Olaf	3	–	5	5	–	5
Augsburg	3	–	5	4	–	6
Gustavus Adolphus	3	–	5	4	–	6
Hamline	2	–	6	4	–	6
Carleton	1	–	7	3	–	7
$ – Conference champion; ^ – NCAA Division III playoff participant; Rankings from D3football.com

2009 New England Football Conference standings
	Conf.			Overall
Team	W		L	W		L
Bogan Division
Maine Maritime xy$^	6	–	1	9	–	2
Bridgewater State	5	–	2	7	–	3
Westfield State	5	–	2	7	–	3
Coast Guard	4	–	3	4	–	5
Framingham State	3	–	4	5	–	5
Fitchburg State	2	–	5	4	–	6
Massachusetts Maritime	2	–	5	3	–	7
Worcester State	1	–	6	1	–	9
Boyd Division
Curry xy	7	–	0	8	–	3
Plymouth State	6	–	1	8	–	3
Western New England	5	–	2	6	–	4
Endicott	3	–	4	5	–	5
Nichols	3	–	4	4	–	6
Salve Regina	3	–	4	4	–	6
MIT	1	–	6	1	–	8
UMass Dartmouth	0	–	7	0	–	10
Championship: Maine Maritime 48, Curry 42
$ – Conference champion; x – Division champion/co-champions; y – Championship game participant; ^ – NCAA Division III playoff participant

2009 New England Small College Athletic Conference football standings
	Conf.			Overall
Team	W		L	W		L
Amherst $	8	–	0	8	–	0
Trinity (CT)	6	–	2	6	–	2
Williams	6	–	2	6	–	2
Middlebury	5	–	3	5	–	3
Colby	4	–	4	4	–	4
Bowdoin	3	–	5	3	–	5
Wesleyan	3	–	5	3	–	5
Hamilton	2	–	6	2	–	6
Tufts	2	–	6	2	–	6
Bates	1	–	7	1	–	7
$ – Conference champion

2009 New Jersey Athletic Conference football standings
	Conf.			Overall
Team	W		L	W		L
No. 22 Montclair State $^	9	–	0	10	–	2
Kean	8	–	1	9	–	2
Cortland *	7	–	2	7	–	4
Rowan	6	–	3	7	–	3
William Paterson	4	–	5	5	–	5
Brockport	3	–	6	4	–	6
TCNJ	3	–	6	4	–	6
Buffalo State	2	–	7	2	–	8
Western Connecticut	2	–	7	2	–	8
Morrisville State	1	–	8	1	–	9
$ – Conference champion; ^ – NCAA Division III playoff participant; * – Cortland later vacated all its wins.; Rankings from D3football.com

2009 North Coast Athletic Conference football standings
	Conf.			Overall
Team	W		L	W		L
No. 6 Wittenberg $^	7	–	0	12	–	1
No. 19 Wabash ^	6	–	1	9	–	2
Allegheny	5	–	2	8	–	2
Wooster	4	–	3	5	–	5
Earlham	3	–	4	5	–	5
Kenyon	3	–	4	3	–	7
Ohio Wesleyan	3	–	4	3	–	7
Denison	2	–	5	3	–	7
Oberlin	2	–	5	2	–	8
Hiram	0	–	7	0	–	10
$ – Conference champion; ^ – NCAA Division III playoff participant; Rankings from D3football.com

2009 Northern Athletics Conference football standings
	Conf.			Overall
Team	W		L	W		L
Lakeland $^	6	–	1	6	–	5
Concordia (IL)	5	–	2	8	–	2
Benedictine (IL)	5	–	2	6	–	4
Concordia (WI)	5	–	2	5	–	5
Wisconsin Lutheran	4	–	3	5	–	5
Aurora	2	–	5	4	–	6
Rockford	1	–	6	1	–	9
Maranatha Baptist	0	–	7	0	–	10
$ – Conference champion; ^ – NCAA Division III playoff participant

2009 Northwest Conference football standings
	Conf.			Overall
Team	W		L	W		L
No. 3 Linfield $^	6	–	0	12	–	1
No. 24 Willamette	5	–	1	8	–	2
Whitworth	3	–	3	5	–	5
Menlo	3	–	3	4	–	6
Pacific Lutheran	3	–	3	3	–	6
Lewis & Clark	1	–	5	2	–	7
Puget Sound	0	–	6	0	–	9
$ – Conference champion; ^ – NCAA Division III playoff participant; Rankings from D3football.com

2009 Ohio Athletic Conference football standings
	Conf.			Overall
Team	W		L	W		L
No. 2 Mount Union $^	9	–	0	14	–	1
No. 13 Ohio Northern	7	–	2	8	–	2
Otterbein	7	–	2	8	–	2
Capital	6	–	3	7	–	3
Muskingum	4	–	5	4	–	6
Heidelberg	3	–	6	4	–	6
Baldwin–Wallace	3	–	6	3	–	7
John Carroll	3	–	6	3	–	7
Marietta	2	–	7	3	–	7
Wilmington (OH)	1	–	8	1	–	9
$ – Conference champion; ^ – NCAA Division III playoff participant; Rankings from D3football.com

2009 Old Dominion Athletic Conference football standings
	Conf.			Overall
Team	W		L	W		L
No. 25 Hampden–Sydney $^	6	–	0	10	–	1
Bridgewater	4	–	2	7	–	3
Randolph–Macon	4	–	2	6	–	4
Emory & Henry	3	–	3	7	–	3
Washington and Lee	2	–	4	4	–	6
Guilford	2	–	4	3	–	7
Catholic University	0	–	6	1	–	9
$ – Conference champion; ^ – NCAA Division III playoff participant; Rankings from D3football.com

2009 Presidents' Athletic Conference football standings
	Conf.			Overall
Team	W		L	W		L
No. 14 Thomas More $^	6	–	0	11	–	1
Washington & Jefferson ^	5	–	1	9	–	2
Grove City	4	–	2	5	–	5
Waynesburg	2	–	4	5	–	5
Westminster (PA)	2	–	4	4	–	6
Bethany (WV)	1	–	5	3	–	7
Thiel	1	–	5	3	–	7
Geneva #		–		8	–	3
Saint Vincent #		–		0	–	10
$ – Conference champion; ^ – NCAA Division III playoff participant; # – Provisional NCAA Divisional III member; games not counted in standings; Rankings from D3football.com

2009 Southern California Intercollegiate Athletic Conference football standings
	Conf.			Overall
Team	W		L	W		L
Cal Lutheran $^	6	–	0	8	–	2
Occidental	5	–	1	7	–	2
Redlands	4	–	2	7	–	2
Claremont–Mudd–Scripps	3	–	3	5	–	4
Pomona–Pitzer	2	–	4	4	–	5
Whittier	1	–	5	3	–	6
La Verne	0	–	6	0	–	9
$ – Conference champion; ^ – NCAA Division III playoff participant; Rankings from D3football.com

2009 Southern Collegiate Athletic Conference football standings
	Conf.			Overall
Team	W		L	W		L
DePauw +^	5	–	1	7	–	3
Millsaps +	5	–	1	7	–	3
Centre	4	–	2	7	–	2
Trinity (TX)	4	–	2	7	–	3
Austin	2	–	4	4	–	5
Rhodes	1	–	5	3	–	7
Sewanee	0	–	6	0	–	9
Birmingham–Southern #		–		4	–	6
+ – Conference co-champions; ^ – NCAA Division III playoff participant; # – Provisional Division III member; games not counted in standings

2009 University Athletic Association football standings
	Conf.			Overall
Team	W		L	W		L
No. 23 Case Western Reserve $^	3	–	0	10	–	1
Chicago	1	–	2	5	–	4
Carnegie Mellon	1	–	2	5	–	5
Washington University	1	–	2	4	–	6
$ – Conference champion; ^ – Division III playoff participant; Rankings from D3football.com

2009 Upper Midwest Athletic Conference football standings
	Conf.			Overall
Team	W		L	W		L
North
Martin Luther x	4	–	0	7	–	3
Northwestern (MN)	3	–	1	5	–	5
St. Scholastica	2	–	2	4	–	6
Crown	1	–	3	4	–	6
Minnesota–Morris	0	–	4	4	–	6
South
Greenville x	3	–	0	7	–	3
Westminster (MO)	2	–	1	5	–	5
Eureka	1	–	2	4	–	6
MacMurray	0	–	3	1	–	9
x – Division champion/co-champions

2009 USA South Athletic Conference football standings
	Conf.			Overall
Team	W		L	W		L
North Carolina Wesleyan $^	7	–	0	8	–	3
Averett	5	–	2	7	–	3
Christopher Newport	4	–	3	5	–	5
Greensboro	4	–	3	5	–	5
Ferrum	3	–	4	5	–	5
Maryville (TN)	3	–	4	4	–	6
Methodist	2	–	5	3	–	7
Shenandoah	0	–	7	1	–	9
$ – Conference champion; ^ – NCAA Division III playoff participant

2009 Wisconsin Intercollegiate Athletic Conference football standings
	Conf.			Overall
Team	W		L	W		L
No. 1 Wisconsin–Whitewater $^	7	–	0	15	–	0
Wisconsin–Stevens Point	6	–	1	7	–	3
Wisconsin–Stout	5	–	2	8	–	2
Wisconsin–Eau Claire	4	–	3	6	–	4
Wisconsin–La Crosse	2	–	5	5	–	5
Wisconsin–Oshkosh	2	–	5	4	–	6
Wisconsin–Platteville	1	–	6	3	–	7
Wisconsin–River Falls	1	–	6	3	–	7
$ – Conference champion; ^ – NCAA Division III playoff participant; Rankings from D3football.com

2009 NCAA Division III independents football records
	Conf.			Overall
Team	W		L	W		L
Huntingdon ^		–		8	–	3
LaGrange		–		5	–	5
Chapman		–		4	–	5
Macalester		–		2	–	8
Anna Maria		–		0	–	9
^ – NCAA Division III playoff participant

== Conference champions ==
Conference champions
- American Southwest Conference – Mary Hardin–Baylor and Mississippi College
- Atlantic Central Football Conference – Wesley
- Centennial Conference – Johns Hopkins
- College Conference of Illinois and Wisconsin – Illinois Wesleyan and North Central (IL)
- Eastern Collegiate Football Conference – Norwich
- Empire 8 Conference – Alfred and St. John Fisher and
- Heartland Collegiate Athletic Conference – Mount St. Joseph
- Iowa Intercollegiate Athletic Conference – Central (IA)
- Liberty League – Susquehanna and Union (NY)
- Michigan Intercollegiate Athletic Association – Trine
- Middle Atlantic Conference – Delaware Valley
- Midwest Conference – Monmouth (IL)
- Minnesota Intercollegiate Athletic Conference – Saint John's (MN)
- New England Football Conference – Maine Maritime (Bogan Division), Curry (Boyd Division)
  - Championship Game: Maine Maritime 48, Curry 42
- New England Small College Athletic Conference – Amherst
- New Jersey Athletic Conference – Montclair State
- North Coast Athletic Conference – Wittenberg
- Northern Athletics Collegiate Conference – Lakeland
- Northwest Conference – Linfield
- Ohio Athletic Conference – Mount Union
- Old Dominion Athletic Conference – Hampden–Sydney
- Presidents' Athletic Conference – Thomas More
- Southern California Intercollegiate Athletic Conference – Cal Lutheran
- Southern Collegiate Athletic Conference – DePauw and Millsaps
- University Athletic Association – Case Western Reserve
- Upper Midwest Athletic Conference – Martin Luther and Greenville
- USA South Athletic Conference – North Carolina Wesleyan
- Wisconsin Intercollegiate Athletic Conference – Wisconsin–Whitewater

== Postseason ==
The 2009 NCAA Division III Football Championship playoffs were the 37th annual single-elimination tournament to determine the national champion of men's NCAA Division III college football. The championship Stagg Bowl game was held at Salem Football Stadium in Salem, Virginia for the 17th time.

=== Qualification ===
Twenty-three conferences met the requirements for an automatic ("Pool A") bid to the playoffs. Besides the NESCAC, which does not participate in the playoffs, four conferences had no Pool A bid. The ECFC and UMAC were in the first year of the two-year waiting period, while the ACFC and UAA failed to meet the seven-member requirement.

Schools not in Pool A conferences were eligible for Pool B. The number of Pool B bids was determined by calculating the ratio of Pool A conferences to schools in those conferences and applying that ratio to the number of Pool B schools. The 23 Pool A conferences contained 196 schools, an average of 8.5 teams per conference. Twenty-eight schools were in Pool B, enough for three bids.

The remaining six playoff spots were at-large ("Pool C") teams.

=== Playoff bracket ===
First Round; Campus Sites
Mount Union	55
Washington & Jefferson	0
Montclair State	38
Maine Maritime	22
Albright	35
Alfred	25
Delaware Valley	66
Susquehanna	7
Wesley	55
North Carolina Wesleyan	23
Mississippi College	56
Huntingdon	35
Johns Hopkins	23
Hampden–Sydney	7
Thomas More	49
DePauw	39
Wisconsin–Whitewater	70
Lakeland	7
Illinois Wesleyan	41
Wabash	35
Trine	51
Case Western	38
Wittenberg	42
Mount St. Joseph	14
Coe	34
Saint John's (MN)	27
St. Thomas (MN)	43
Monmouth (IL)	21
Mary Hardin–Baylor	42
Central (IA)	40
Linfield	38
Cal Lutheran	17

Second Round; Campus Sites
Mount Union	62
Montclair State	14
Albright	27
Delaware Valley	3
Wesley	43
Mississippi College	9
Johns Hopkins	31
Thomas More	29
Wisconsin–Whitewater	45
Illinois Wesleyan	7
Trine	17
Wittenberg	34
Coe	7
St. Thomas (MN)	34
Mary Hardin–Baylor	21
Linfield	53

Quarterfinals; Campus Sites
Mount Union	55
Albright	3
Wesley	12
Johns Hopkins	0
Wisconsin–Whitewater	31
Wittenberg	13
St. Thomas (MN)	20
Linfield	31

Semifinals; Campus Sites
Mount Union	24
Wesley	7
Wisconsin–Whitewater	27
Linfield	17

National Championship Game; Salem Football Stadium; Salem, Virginia
Mount Union	28
Wisconsin–Whitewater	38

* Overtime

== See also ==
- 2009 NCAA Division I FBS football season
- 2009 NCAA Division I FCS football season
- 2009 NCAA Division II football season
