= David Saunders (American football coach) =

American football coach and educator

Biographical details
- Born: April 6, 1958 (age 68); Douglasville, Georgia, U.S.
- Education: Auburn University

Coaching career (HC unless noted)
- 1984–1989: Jacksonville State (DB/WR/RC)
- 1990–1992: Georgia Southern (DL)
- 1993–1994: Nicholls State (DC/DB)
- 1995: Baylor (DB)
- 1996–1997: Arkansas State (DB/RC)
- 1998: Tennessee (RC)
- 1998–2002: Ole Miss (RC)
- 2003–2005: Millsaps
- 2006: Ole Miss (LB)
- 2010: Ole Miss (ath. dept.)
- 2011–2014: Louisiana–Lafayette (CB)
- 2015: Pearl River (DB/ST)
- 2016: Pearl River

Head coaching record
- Overall: 7–21 (college); 2–7 (junior college)

David "Sarge" Saunders (born April 6, 1958) is an American football coach and educator. He served as the head football coach at Millsaps College from 2003 to 2005 and Pearl River Community College in 2016.

Saunders was once named one of the nation's top nine recruiters by ESPN.com's Tom Lemming. During his coaching career, Saunders coached over 20 future National Football League (NFL) players.

== Head coaching career ==
Saunders was named head football coach at Millsaps College in Jackson, Mississippi in 2003 and held the position through the 2005 season. He had an overall record of 7–21 and a 5–13 conference record in the Southern Collegiate Athletic Conference.

Saunders had a 2–7 record in his one season as head coach at Pearl River Community College in 2016.

== Assistant coaching career ==
Saunders first college coaching job was at Jacksonville State University from 1984 to 1989 as defensive backs coach, wide receivers coach and recruiting coordinator. From 1990 to 1992 he was defensive line coach at Georgia Southern, where the 1990 team won the Division I-AA National Championship.

From 1993 to 1994 Saunders was defensive coordinator and defensive backs coach at Nicholls State University. In 1995, Saunders moved to Baylor University as safeties coach.

During the 1996a and 1997 seasons, Saunders was defensive backs coach and recruiting coordinator at Arkansas State University. In 1998, he spent the football season at the University of Tennessee working as an on-campus recruiting coordinator.

From 1999 to 2002, Saunders was an assistant to the athletics director for recruiting and coordinator of high school and community college relations at Ole Miss. In 2006, he returned to Ole Miss as linebackers coach. Saunders again returned to Ole Miss for a third time as administrative operations coordinator in 2010.

From 2011 to 2014, he was defensive backs coach at the University of Louisiana–Lafayette. On November 3, 2014, Saunders abruptly announced his resignation, with head coach Mark Hudspeth citing "personal reasons" for the resignation. Almost a year after his departure, the NCAA announced that the Ragin' Cajuns were under investigation due to severe recruiting violations committed by Saunders.

In 2015, Saunders was defensive backs coach and special teams coordinator at Pearl River Community College.

== Personal life ==
Saunders is an alumnus of Auburn University.

== Head coaching record ==
=== College ===
Year	Team	Overall	Conference	Standing	Bowl/playoffs
Millsaps Majors (Southern Collegiate Athletic Conference) (2003–2005)
2003	Millsaps	1–9	1–5	6th	
2004	Millsaps	4–5	3–3	T–3rd	
2005	Millsaps	2–7	1–5	6th	
Millsaps:		7–21	5–13		
Total:		7–21			

=== Junior college ===
Year	Team	Overall	Conference	Standing	Bowl/playoffs
Pearl River Wildcats (Mississippi Association of Community and Junior Colleges) (2016)
2016	Pearl River	2–7	2–4	4th (South)	
Pearl River:		2–7	2–4		
Total:		2–7			
