= Aaron Pelch =

American college administrator (born 1977)

Current position
- Title: Vice president of admissions
- Team: Millsaps
- Conference: SAA

Biographical details
- Born: September 9, 1977; Sandy, Utah, U.S.

Playing career
- 1999–2000: Weber State

Coaching career (HC unless noted)
- ?: Everett Alvarez HS (CA) (assistant)
- ?: New Mexico Highlands (assistant)
- 2006: Millsaps (LB)
- 2007–2008: Millsaps (AHC)
- 2009: Oakland Raiders (assistant ST)
- 2010–2019: Millsaps

Administrative career (AD unless noted)
- 2018–present: Millsaps

Head coaching record
- Overall: 49–50

Accomplishments and honors

Championships
- 2 SAA (2012–2013)

Aaron Pelch (born September 9, 1977) is an American college athletics administrator and former football coach. He is the athletic director at Millsaps College in Jackson, Mississippi, a position he held on an interim basis from December 2018 until being appointed on a permanent basis in January 2020. Pelch served as the head football coach at Millsaps for ten season, from 2010 to 2019, compiling a record of 49–50. In 2009, Pelch was a special teams assistant for the Oakland Raiders of the National Football League (NFL).

== Head coaching record ==
Year	Team	Overall	Conference	Standing	Bowl/playoffs
Millsaps Majors (Southern Collegiate Athletic Conference) (2010–2011)
2010	Millsaps	7–3	5–1	2nd	
2011	Millsaps	4–6	3–3	4th	
Millsaps Majors (Southern Athletic Association) (2012–2019)
2012	Millsaps	7–3	3–1	T–1st	
2013	Millsaps	9–1	5–1	T–1st	
2014	Millsaps	3–6	2–4	5th	
2015	Millsaps	3–7	2–6	T–7th	
2016	Millsaps	3–7	2–6	7th	
2017	Millsaps	3–7	2–6	T–6th	
2018	Millsaps	5–5	3–5	T–5th	
2019	Millsaps	5–5	3–5	T–6th	
Millsaps:		49–50	30–38		
Total:		49–50			
National championship Conference title Conference division title or championship game berth
