= Millsaps Majors football =

- First season: 1920; 106 years ago
- Athletic director: Aaron Pelch
- Head coach: Brandon Lechtenberg; 2nd season, 5–5 (.500)
- Location: Jackson, Mississippi
- Stadium: Harper Davis Field
- Conference: SAA
- Colors: Purple and white
- All-time record: 380–356–36 (.516)
- Website: gomajors.com

The Millsaps Majors football team represents Millsaps College in Jackson, Mississippi. They compete in the NCAA's Division III and the Southern Athletic Association. Millsaps's all-time record in football is 380 wins, 356 losses and 36 ties (.516). The gridiron Majors have posted two undefeated regular seasons in their history (1980 & 2008), earned three NCAA playoff tournament berths (1975, 2006 & 2008) and claimed six Southern Collegiate Athletic Conference championships (1991, 1996, 2006, 2007, 2008 & 2009). Its major rival is Belhaven University.

== History ==
=== Prior to 1964 ===
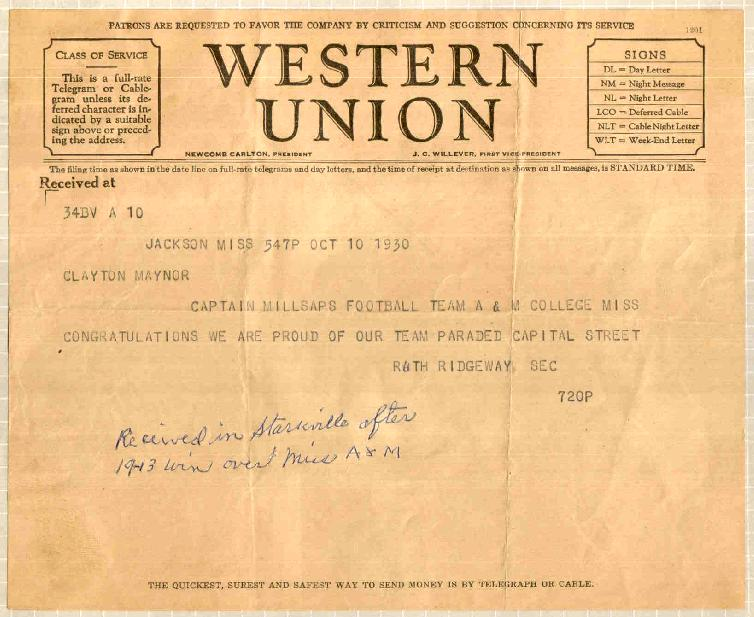
1930 Western Union Telegram: Millsaps College beats Mississippi State University (then Mississippi A&M) in football, 19–13.

Millsaps fielded its first intercollegiate football team in 1920. From 1920 to 1963 the Majors accumulated a 131–174–30 record over 40 seasons (no team was fielded in 1942, 1943 or 1945).

Between 1920 and 1959 the Majors met their rival Mississippi College Choctaws in 39 games, constituting the historic Backyard Brawl rivalry between the two schools. During that time the Choctaws claimed a 24–9–6 lead in the series, which was discontinued after 1959.

=== The Harper Davis era (1964–1988) ===
In 1964, Harper Davis took over as the Majors' head coach. A Clarksdale, Mississippi native, Davis had been a four-time All-SEC selection as a defensive back at Mississippi State from 1945 to 1948 who went on to a brief professional career. Davis's tenure at Millsaps got off to an inauspicious start: The Majors finished 0–8 in 1964, followed by losing seasons in two of the next three years. From there, however, Davis elevated the program to one of the most competitive in the South among the small college ranks, with 19 winning seasons between 1968 and 1988.

In 1975, Davis guided the team to its first-ever berth in the Division III playoffs, where the Majors lost to eventual national champion Wittenberg in the semifinal round to finish the year with a 9–2 record. Five years later, in 1980, the Majors completed their first and only undefeated season to date. With Davis at the helm, the team went 9–0, racking up 350 points (38.9/game) while allowing opponents just 31 (3.4/game), recorded five shutouts and won four games by more than 50 points each, including setting the school record for points in a game in an 84–0 drubbing of Landmark Baptist College. The highlight of the season was an 8–7 victory over Central Florida's up-and-coming football program, played before 12,793 fans at the Tangerine Bowl in Orlando. It was Central Florida who returned to Jackson the following season and snapped the Majors 13-game winning streak dating back to the final contest of the 1979 season, 13–6.

Davis retired after the 1988 season, having guided the Majors to a 140–78–4 record (.631) during his 25 year-tenure. All of the Majors' previous coaches had accumulated just 131 victories in 40 seasons.

=== After Davis (1989–2005) ===
After Davis stepped down, his longtime assistant, Tommy Ranager, was named to lead the football program. The 1989 season marked the first time the Majors played as a conference affiliate and not an independent team, having joined the expanding Collegiate Athletic Conference. In 1991, Ranager's Majors finished the year 7–2, including a 3–1 conference mark that earned Millsaps a share of the first conference championship of the newly restructured and renamed Southern Collegiate Athletic Conference and Ranager conference "Coach of the Year" honors. In 1994, however, Ranager's Majors finished 4–6 (2–2 SCAC), marking the team's first losing season since 1977, and followed that with a 2–7 (0–4 SCAC) campaign in 1995, prompting the program to seek new direction.

Ron Jurney, who succeeded Ranager, guided the Majors to an 8–2 (4–1) finish and a share of the program's second SCAC championship in his first season in 1996, earning him conference "Coach of the Year" honors. The Majors snapped Trinity's streak of 12 consecutive victories by a 13–10 margin in the season finale in Jackson to share the SCAC title with the Tigers. However, Jurney's teams over the next three seasons never won more than three games in a season, accumulating a combined record of 8–22 (2–15 SCAC), resulting in Jurney being relieved of his post after the 1999 campaign.

Former Mississippi State head coach Bob Tyler, who guided the Bulldogs to several successful seasons during the 1970s, was hired to replace Jurney. Under Tyler, Millsaps and Mississippi College renewed their historic Backyard Brawl rivalry in 2000. The much anticipated game was played at Memorial Stadium in Jackson before more than 10,000 fans, with the Majors kicking the winning field goal with 16 seconds left for a 20–19 victory. Since the series was renewed, the Majors and the Choctaws have faced off in the opening week of every season except 2005, when the teams did not meet. Tyler led the team to a .500 record in 2000 (5–5, 2–4 SCAC) and a winning season in 2001 (6–4, 3–3 SCAC), however, when the Majors finished the 2002 season with five consecutive loses, all against conference opponents, resulting in a disappointing 3–6 (1–5 SCAC) record, the program again opted to make a change.

In 2003, Millsaps hired David Saunders to fill Tyler's vacated post, making him the program's fourth coach in the fourteen seasons since Harper Davis's retirement. Saunders had previously been the Recruiting Coordinator on David Cutcliffe's staff at Ole Miss. After three unsuccessful seasons resulting in a combined 7–21 record (5–13 SCAC), Saunders returned to the Rebels to join Ed Orgeron's staff.

=== Resurgence under DuBose (2006–2009) ===
After just one season at Millsaps, defensive coordinator Mike DuBose was promoted to head coach to replace Saunders in 2006. DuBose had previously been the head coach of Alabama's football team from 1997 to 2000, leading the Crimson Tide to an SEC championship in 1999.

==== 2006 ====
DuBose's first season of 2006 got off to a rocky start. The Majors were hammered 52–28 by Mississippi College in the season-opening Backyard Brawl game, which returned after a one-year hiatus in 2005. The Majors then lost their next two games in heartbreaking fashion, by a combined total of four points. However, DuBose's team managed an incredible turn-around that shocked the SCAC, when the team went on to win their next six games to set up a showdown with perennial SCAC juggernaut Trinity in the season finale. Each team entered the contest at 5–0 in conference play, meaning the winner would receive the SCAC's automatic playoff bid and claim the SCAC title outright.

==== 2007 ====
Having established themselves as a force to be reckoned with in the SCAC, DuBose and the 2007 Majors, led by a large group of seniors and returning starters, set their goals high, aiming to repeat as SCAC champions and gain another playoff berth. The season began on a sour note, however, when Millsaps suffered a disappointing loss at the hands of Mississippi College in the Backyard Brawl. Millsaps, having led comfortably for most of the game, took a 26–6 advantage into the fourth quarter. However, as the Majors were resting their starters and putting less experienced players into the game, the Choctaws began to find a rhythm. DuBose never returned his starters to the game as his team's lead began to dwindle and Mississippi College roared back with three touchdowns in the final quarter to claim a 27–26 victory.

==== 2008 ====
The 2008 season was a very successful season. The Majors rolled through the regular season, going 10–0 and outscoring their opponents 442 to 132. The team avenged 2007's crushing loses at the hands of Mississippi College and Trinity, pummeling the Choctaws 42–6 in the eighth edition of the renewed Backyard Brawl and punishing the Tigers 56–27 in San Antonio.

The Majors captured their third consecutive SCAC championship, winning outright to earn the program's third NCAA tournament berth, became the first team in the program's history to reach double digit wins and climbed to their highest ever national ranking, #3, before finishing the season 11–1 and ranked #12 nationally.

Once again, DuBose was named the conference's "Coach of the Year" and senior quarterback Juan Joseph was the SCAC's "Offensive Player of the Year" for the third consecutive season. Sophomore wide receiver and return specialist Michael Galatas was named the conference's "Special Teams Player of the Year" and freshman running back Shane Bowser was the SCAC's co-"Newcomer of the Year." In all, 20 Majors were named to the All-SCAC first team, second team and honorable mention lists.

==== 2009 ====
In 2009, the Majors finished 5–1 in SCAC play to again earn a share of the conference title. The team's fourth conference championship in as many years was added to the accomplishments of the winningest senior class in the program's history, who finished their four-year careers with a 33–10 overall record.

However, the team had hoped to attain another NCAA playoff berth, a cause derailed by three painfully close loses. First, the Majors lost to their rival Choctaws in two overtimes in the season-opening ninth edition of the renewed Backyard Brawl. Millsaps won their next three games, including an emotional 24–6 victory over Trinity after a week in which Coach DuBose's wife Polly underwent the first of several breast cancer surgeries that took place during the season.

The team finished the season on a positive note, handily dispatching of their last four opponents, including a homecoming victory over previously undefeated Centre. A 61–7 dismantling of Sewanee the following week secured the program's share of a fourth consecutive conference title.

Junior return specialist Michael Galatas was named the SCAC's "Special Teams Player of the Year" for the second consecutive season, the fourth consecutive season the award went to a Major, and junior linebacker Will Hawkins was the conference's "Defensive Player of the Year", and a first team All-American. A total of 20 Majors were voted to the all-conference first, second and honorable mention teams.

=== After DuBose (2010–present) ===
On March 1, 2010, Aaron Pelch was named as DuBose's successor. Pelch, a former Weber State University player and 2001 graduate, was a defensive assistant for DuBose's Majors from 2006 to 2008, before joining Tom Cable's Oakland Raiders staff as a special teams coach in 2009.

==== 2010 ====
Pelch guided the 2010 Majors to a 7–3 (5–1) record in his first season, but the team saw its streak of 4 consecutive SCAC championships snapped by virtue of a 21–35 home loss to DePauw, who finished the year 6–0 in conference play. The Majors' 2011 senior class tied the record set by the previous year's senior class of most career victories, with 33 in a four-year span. For the 5th year in a row, the Majors' offense was the SCAC's highest scoring unit.
