= Larry Porter (American football) =

American football player and coach (born 1972)

Current position
- Title: Running backs coach
- Team: Auburn
- Conference: SEC

Biographical details
- Born: April 28, 1972 (age 54); Jackson, Mississippi, U.S.

Playing career
- 1990–1993: Memphis
- Position: Running back

Coaching career (HC unless noted)
- 1998: Tennessee–Martin (RB)
- 1999–2001: Arkansas State (RB)
- 2002–2004: Oklahoma State (RB)
- 2005–2009: LSU (AHC/STC/RB)
- 2010–2011: Memphis
- 2012: Arizona State (RB)
- 2013: Texas (RB)
- 2014–2016: North Carolina (RB)
- 2017–2020: Auburn (TE/HB/RC)
- 2021: North Carolina (RB/asst. STC)
- 2022–2024: North Carolina (STC/RB)
- 2025: West Virginia (RB)
- 2026–present: Auburn (RB)

Head coaching record
- Overall: 3–21

Larry Porter (born April 28, 1972) is an American college football coach. He currently serves as the running backs coach at Auburn University. Porter is a former head coach of the Memphis Tigers football team. He was named to the position on November 29, 2009, replacing Tommy West. A former running back for the school when it was known as Memphis State University, Porter was formerly an assistant head coach, chief recruiter, and running backs coach at Louisiana State University under Les Miles. On November 27, 2011, Porter was fired after completing a 2–10 season with only having won three games during his two-year tenure. On January 21, 2021, UNC hired Porter as the running backs coach and special teams coordinator. On March 6, 2025, Rich Rodriguez hired Porter as the running backs coach at WVU.

== Playing career ==
Porter had 2,194 yards with the University of Memphis during the 1990s.

== Coaching career ==
Porter was a multi-sport coach during the late 1990s for Wooddale High School. Leading up to 2001, he worked for the University of Tennessee at Martin and Arkansas State University as a running backs coach. In 2002, Porter was hired by Oklahoma State coach Les Miles as Running Backs coach. In 2005, Porter joined coach Miles at LSU.

In 2008, LSU again had one of the top running games in the SEC as the Tigers rushed for 166.8 yards per game with Scott getting the bulk of the carries (1,174 yards on 217 attempts). Scott, who earned first-team All-SEC in 2008, and Keiland Williams (417 yards, 2 touchdowns on 83 attempts) gave the Tigers one of the top 1–2 rushing punches in the league last year.

Porter and the Tigers had a running back-by-committee approach during the national championship season in 2007 with Hester leading all rushers with a career-best 1,103 yards and 11 touchdowns. Hester, who was a second-team All-SEC selection, had four 100-yard rushing games, including a 120-yard effort against Tennessee in the SEC Championship Game. Williams was second on the squad with 478 yards and six scores, while Trindon Holliday was third with 364 yards and two touchdowns.

As a unit, LSU rushed for 214.1 yards per game and 35 touchdowns. The 214.1 yards per game and 35 rushing touchdowns both ranked second in the SEC. Another impressive feat for the Tiger running backs was that they combined for 432 carries in 2007 with just one lost fumble, which came against Tennessee in the SEC title game.

Following the 2007 season, Hester was picked in the third round of the 2008 NFL draft by the San Diego Chargers. Hester became the fourth running back coached by Porter that has been selected among the first three rounds of the NFL draft since 2004.

In 2006, Porter juggled running backs as the Tigers started four players, including two true freshmen, at tailback. In 13 games, the Tigers had five running backs lead the team in rushing. Hester led the Tigers in rushing with 440 yards and six scores. Hester added another 269 yards and three touchdowns on 35 receptions, which ranked as the third-highest total for a running back in school history.

A pair of true freshmen in Scott and Williams also burst onto the scene during the 2006 season, giving the Tigers a glimpse of the future as they combined for 713 yards and 10 touchdowns. Williams capped his first season with the Tigers in a big way, rushing for 107 yards and a pair of scores in LSU's 41–14 win over Notre Dame in the Sugar Bowl.

As a unit, the Tigers ranked second in the SEC in rushing in 2006 with 165.8 yards per game. The Tigers also had 25 rushing touchdowns, a figure that ranked No. 2 in the league.

In his first year with the team in 2005, Porter made an immediate impact on LSU's running game as the Tigers, despite losing perhaps the top runner in the SEC in Alley Broussard to a knee injury in mid-August, still managed to rush for 1,951 yards and 21 touchdowns. LSU's rushing offense ranked fourth in the SEC, while the 21 rushing touchdowns was the second-highest total in the league.

Addai had his best year in a Tiger uniform, rushing for 911 yards and nine touchdowns; while Justin Vincent added 488 yards and five scores. Addai had five 100-yard rushing games, capped by a 130-yard, one-touchdown performance in LSU's 40–3 win over Miami in the Peach Bowl. He went on to become a first round draft pick of the Indianapolis Colts in the 2006 NFL draft, becoming the first LSU running back taken in the first round of the NFL draft since Harvey Williams was the 21st overall pick by the Chiefs in 1991. Addai was a finalist for NFL Rookie of the Year in 2006 and played a key role in the Colts' Super Bowl victory over the Chicago Bears.

Porter took over the head coaching position at his alma mater, the University of Memphis, for the 2010 season. He was fired after the 2011 season after winning only three games over two seasons.

On February 10, it was announced that Porter would take the position of running backs coach at Arizona State University. The move comes after former coach Chris Thomsen left to coach the offensive line at Texas Tech University.

On January 1, 2013, Porter accepted the running backs coaching position at the University of Texas at Austin. On February 11, 2014, Porter was announced as the running backs coach at the University of North Carolina at Chapel Hill. On February 11, 2017, Porter was announced as tight ends and H-back coach and recruiting coordinator at Auburn University.

On January 29, 2021, Porter was announced as running backs coach at the University of North Carolina, returning for a second stint in Chapel Hill and reuniting with head coach Mack Brown, whom he had worked for at Texas for the 2013 season. Porter replaced Robert Gillespie, who left for Alabama. He was also given the title of assistant special teams coordinator, working with coordinator Jovan Dewitt. Following Dewitt's departure after the conclusion of the 2021 season, Porter was named the Tar Heels' special teams coordinator in addition to his responsibilities as running backs coach.

== Head coaching record ==
Year	Team	Overall	Conference	Standing	Bowl/playoffs
Memphis Tigers (Conference USA) (2010–2011)
2010	Memphis	1–11	0–8	6th (East)	
2011	Memphis	2–10	1–7	6th (East)	
Memphis:		3–21	1–15		
Total:		3–21			
