= Centenary College =

Centenary College can refer to:

- Centenary College of New Jersey, (now Centenary University) a private college located in Hackettstown, New Jersey, USA
- Centenary College of Louisiana, a private college in Shreveport, Louisiana, USA
- Centenary College of Louisiana at Jackson, a historic campus known as Centenary State Historic Site, in Jackson, Louisiana, USA
- Centenary College (Tennessee), a dormant institution formed by the Methodist Church which closed in 1929, located in Cleveland, Tennessee. Noted at Lee_University#Campus
