= Juan Joseph =

American gridiron football player (1987–2014)

No. 7
- Position: Quarterback

Personal information
- Born: August 26, 1987; Jefferson, Louisiana, U.S.
- Died: November 16, 2014 (aged 27); Baton Rouge, Louisiana, U.S.
- Listed height: 6 ft 2 in (1.88 m)
- Listed weight: 200 lb (91 kg)

Career information
- High school: Edgard (LA) West St. John
- College: Millsaps
- NFL draft: 2009: undrafted

Career history
- Edmonton Eskimos (2009)*; Saskatchewan Roughriders (2009)*; Lafayette Wildcatters (2010)
- * Offseason or practice squad member only

Awards and highlights
- 3× SCAC Player of the Year (2006–2008); Conerly Trophy (2008)

Juan Joseph (August 26, 1987 – November 16, 2014) was an American football quarterback. He played college football for the Millsaps Majors. He was signed by the Edmonton Eskimos of the Canadian Football League (CFL) as an undrafted free agent in 2009. Joseph was also a member of the Saskatchewan Roughriders of the CFL and the Lafayette Wildcatters of the Southern Indoor Football League (SIFL).

== Early life ==
Joseph attended West Saint John Parish High School in Edgard, Louisiana, where he was a member of the Rams 2003 and 2004 Class 2A State Championship teams. While in high school, he was a teammate of future LSU and NFL players Tyson Jackson and Quinn Johnson. In high school, he played baseball, basketball and football, trying out for the football team in his sophomore year.

== College career ==
Joseph played collegiately for the Millsaps College Majors of the NCAA's Division III. He was offered a full scholarship at Alcorn State University, but chose Millsaps because he wanted to attain a degree from a school with a nationally recognized business program.

In 2005, his first year at Millsaps, Joseph split playing time as a backup quarterback. The Majors finished 2–7 on the year.

As a sophomore in 2006, Joseph led a resurgence of the Majors' struggling program, under the tutelage of new head coach Mike DuBose, formerly the head coach of the Alabama Crimson Tide. The Majors finished with a 7–4 record (6–0 in conference play), claiming the program's third SCAC title and second-ever playoff berth. Joseph was named the conference's player of the year.

In 2007, Joseph again led the Majors to a SCAC title, the team finishing with an 8–2 record. He was again named the conference's player of the year.

As a senior in 2008, Joseph led the Majors to the second best season in the program's history. The team finished 11–1 and ranked #12 nationally in the D3football.com poll, after peaking at #3 during the season. Joseph was for the third consecutive year the SCAC player of the year. He also won the Conerly Trophy, given annually to the best college football player in the state of Mississippi, edging out fellow finalists and future first-round NFL draft selections Michael Oher and Peria Jerry. He was also a finalist for the Gagliardi Trophy.

Joseph played in 38 games for the Majors from 2005 to 2008, amassing 9,295 passing yards (244.6/game) and 87 passing touchdowns (2.3/game) compared to 27 interceptions, and completing 814 of 1,283 pass attempts (63.4%). He also rushed for 537 yards and 8 touchdowns on 161 attempts. During his tenure, the Majors accumulated a 28–14 overall win–loss record, including a 20–6 record in conference play, three SCAC title's and two playoff appearances. Joseph's priority while at college was not to play professionally. A good student, he admitted it would be nice, but this was not one of his goals.

=== College statistics ===
Millsaps Majors
Season	Games			Passing							Rushing			
Season	GP	GS	Record	Comp	Att	Yards	Pct	TD	Int	Rtg	Att	Yds	Avg	TD
2005	7	2	1–1	35	70	477	50.0	3	1	118.5	18	47	2.6	0
2006	10	10	7–3	224	374	2,495	59.9	21	14	127.0	35	35	1.0	2
2007	9	9	7–2	254	394	2,860	64.5	31	6	148.4	32	33	1.0	2
2008	12	12	11–1	301	445	3,463	67.6	32	6	154.0	76	412	5.4	4
Career	38	33	26–7	814	1,283	9,295	63.4	87	27	142.5	161	527	3.3	8

== Professional career ==
Joseph was signed by the Edmonton Eskimos in March 2009.

Joseph was traded to the Saskatchewan Roughriders for Kitwana Jones on May 15, 2009. He was cut on June 25, 2009.

Joseph joined the Lafayette Wildcatters two days prior to the start of the 2010 SIFL season. The team began the year 1–4 before Joseph became the starter. With Joseph at the helm, the team soared to a 5–1 turnaround, achieving a winning season and a playoff berth.

== Personal life ==
Joseph was married with a young daughter and a second child due just weeks after his death. His younger brother, Dray Joseph, was also a quarterback at West Saint John, and played collegiately for Southern University, where he became the school's all-time leading passer with 8,745 yards and 73 touchdowns, and led the Jaguars to a 9–4 record and a SWAC championship as a senior in 2013.

In the early morning hours of November 16, 2014, Joseph attempted to de-escalate a verbal altercation between two groups of men outside of the Allure nightclub in Baton Rouge, Louisiana. Joseph's efforts were unsuccessful, and he was shot twice in the torso. He succumbed to his injuries after being taken to nearby Baton Rouge Hospital. Before his death, Joseph was an assistant football coach at West St. John High School in Edgard, Louisiana.
