= Millsaps–Mississippi College rivalry =

College sports rivalry

Millsaps–Mississippi College football rivalry
- Mississippi College Choctaws
- Teams: Millsaps Majors; Mississippi College Choctaws
- First meeting: 1920; Mississippi College 60, Millsaps 0
- Latest meeting: September 7, 2013; Millsaps 52, Mississippi College 19

Statistics
- Total meetings: 52
- All-time series: Mississippi College leads, 31–15–6
- Largest victory: Mississippi College, 60–0 (1920)
- Longest win streak: Mississippi College, 7 (1937–1946)
- Current win streak: Millsaps, 2 (2012–present)

Locations in Mississippi
Locations of Millsaps College and Mississippi College

The Millsaps–Mississippi College rivalry is a sports rivalry between the Millsaps College Majors and the Mississippi College Choctaws. It chiefly manifested in the former college football matchup, known as the Backyard Brawl as both schools are located in the Jackson metro area. The two schools met nearly every year in various sports from 1920 through spring 1960, after which time the series was cancelled when a fight broke out at a men's basketball game. The college football series resumed in 2000 but was discontinued again in 2013, when Mississippi College transitioned to Division II. The Choctaws, having dissolved their football program after the 2024 season, concluded the series with a lead of 31–15–6.

== History ==
The series began in 1920, when Millsaps College fielded its first college football team. The game was played annually from then until 1959, except for a four-year hiatus during World War II. To that point Mississippi College dominated the rivalry with a win–loss record of 24–9–6. The series was cancelled after fighting broke out at a Millsaps–Mississippi College basketball game in early 1960. Mississippi College students had taken a flag from a Millsaps fraternity and threw it in the air during the game; when Millsaps students went to retrieve it a scuffle ensued. Sports games between the schools were subsequently cancelled; though a few basketball games were played over the years, there were no football games for another four decades.

Later, the Mississippi Sports Council worked with both schools to resume the football series, which was dubbed the "Backyard Brawl" due to the colleges' proximity in the Jackson area. The first game was held on September 2, 2000, at Mississippi Veterans Memorial Stadium and reportedly drew 13,000 fans, an NCAA Division III record. The teams annually opened their seasons against one another at Memorial Stadium from then through the 2004 season. In 2005, the series took a one-year hiatus when Mississippi College began preparing for a potential move to Division II, where they could grant athletic scholarships. However, this move did not materialize at the time, and the series resumed in 2006, again as an opening week contest but with the games alternating between the schools' campuses. The renewed rivalry was hotly contested, with 7 of 13 games decided by a single score. The series was discontinued when the Choctaws returned to Division II in 2014, and permanently concluded when they dissolved their football program in 2024. Mississippi College led all-time series 31–15–6, as well as the modern rivalry by a 7-6 margin.

== Game results ==
=== Historic rivalry (1920–1959) ===
Millsaps victories	Mississippi College victories	Tie games

No.	Date	Location	Winning team		Losing team	
1	1920	Jackson, MS	Mississippi College	60	Millsaps	0
2	1921	Jackson, MS	Mississippi College	56	Millsaps	0
3	1922	Jackson, MS	Mississippi College	13	Millsaps	6
4	1923	Jackson, MS	Tie	0	Tie	0
5	1924	Jackson, MS	Mississippi College	14	Millsaps	0
6	1925	Jackson, MS	Millsaps	6	Mississippi College	0
7	1926	Jackson, MS	Mississippi College	43	Millsaps	13
8	1927	Jackson, MS	Mississippi College	12	Millsaps	0
9	1928	Jackson, MS	Tie	6	Tie	6
10	1929	Jackson, MS	Millsaps	7	Mississippi College	0
11	1930	Jackson, MS	Mississippi College	8	Millsaps	7
12	1931	Jackson, MS	Mississippi College	9	Millsaps	0
13	1932	Jackson, MS	Mississippi College	7	Millsaps	6
14	1933	Jackson, MS	Millsaps	2	Mississippi College	0
15	1934	Jackson, MS	Millsaps	13	Mississippi College	0
16	1935	Jackson, MS	Tie	0	Tie	0
17	1936	Jackson, MS	Millsaps	7	Mississippi College	0
18	1936	Jackson, MS	Mississippi College	19	Millsaps	7
19	1937	Jackson, MS	Tie	0	Tie	0
20	1937	Jackson, MS	Mississippi College	12	Millsaps	0

No.	Date	Location	Winning team		Losing team	
21	1938	Jackson, MS	Mississippi College	21	Millsaps	0
22	1938	Clinton, MS	Mississippi College	32	Millsaps	0
23	1939	Jackson, MS	Mississippi College	29	Millsaps	0
24	1940	Clinton, MS	Mississippi College	27	Millsaps	0
25	1941	Jackson, MS	Mississippi College	21	Millsaps	0
26	1946	Jackson, MS	Mississippi College	35	Millsaps	0
27	1947	Jackson, MS	Millsaps	7	Mississippi College	0
28	1948	Clinton, MS	Mississippi College	20	Millsaps	14
29	1949	Jackson, MS	Mississippi College	42	Millsaps	6
30	1950	Clinton, MS	Mississippi College	19	Millsaps	7
31	1951	Jackson, MS	Millsaps	12	Mississippi College	7
32	1952	Clinton, MS	Millsaps	21	Mississippi College	20
33	1953	Jackson, MS	Mississippi College	20	Millsaps	19
34	1954	Clinton, MS	Millsaps	13	Mississippi College	6
35	1955	Jackson, MS	Mississippi College	18	Millsaps	14
36	1956	Clinton, MS	Tie	0	Tie	0
37	1957	Jackson, MS	Mississippi College	19	Millsaps	0
38	1958	Clinton, MS	Tie	0	Tie	0
39	1959	Jackson, MS	Mississippi College	26	Millsaps	6
Series: Mississippi College leads 24–9–6

=== Modern rivalry (2000–2013) ===
Millsaps victories	Mississippi College victories	Tie games

No.	Date	Location	Winning team		Losing team	
1	September 2, 2000	Jackson, MS	Millsaps	20	Mississippi College	19
2	September 1, 2001	Jackson, MS	Mississippi College	15	Millsaps	3
3	September 7, 2002	Jackson, MS	Millsaps	16	Mississippi College	14
4	September 4, 2003	Jackson, MS	Mississippi College	13	Millsaps	0
5	September 9, 2004	Jackson, MS	Millsaps	9	Mississippi College	0
6	September 2, 2006	Jackson, MS	Mississippi College	52	Millsaps	28
7	August 30, 2007	Clinton, MS	Mississippi College	27	Millsaps	26

No.	Date	Location	Winning team		Losing team	
8	September 6, 2008	Jackson, MS	Millsaps	42	Mississippi College	6
9	September 5, 2009	Clinton, MS	Mississippi College	47	Millsaps	44^{2OT}
10	September 4, 2010	Jackson, MS	Mississippi College	27	Millsaps	23
11	September 3, 2011	Clinton, MS	Mississippi College	33	Millsaps	27^{OT}
12	September 1, 2012	Jackson, MS	Millsaps	23	Mississippi College	17
13	September 7, 2013	Clinton, MS	Millsaps	52	Mississippi College	19
Series: Mississippi College leads 7–6

== See also ==
- List of NCAA college football rivalry games
