= Trinity Tigers football =

- First season: 1900
- Head coach: Jerheme Urban; 12th season, 89–32 (.736)
- Stadium: Trinity Stadium
- Location: San Antonio, Texas
- NCAA division: Division III
- Conference: Southern Athletic Association

National finalist
- 1 (2002)

Conference championships
- SCAC: 1993, 1994, 1995, 1996, 1997, 1998, 1999, 2000, 2001, 2002, 2003, 2004, 2005, 2007, 2011; SAA: 2019, 2021
- Colors: Maroon and white
- Website: trinitytigers.com

The Trinity Tigers football team represents Trinity University, located in San Antonio, Texas, in NCAA Division III college football.

The Tigers, who began playing football in 1900, compete as members of the Southern Athletic Association.

== History ==
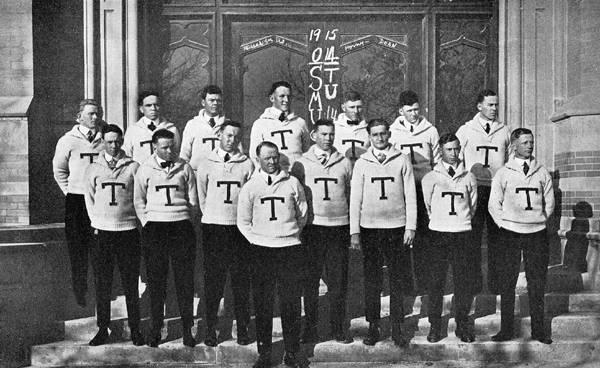
Trinity football team, 1915

Trinity University started its football team in 1900 and played Baylor University in the first game. The Tigers won conference championships in 1993, 1994, 1995, 1996, 1997, 1998, 1999, 2000, 2001, 2002, 2003, 2004, 2005, 2007, 2011, 2019, 2021, 2022, and 2023.

In November 2015, Trinity and Austin College announced they would affiliate with the Southern Athletic Association for football in 2017. The 2019 football team were co-champions of the Southern Athletic Association.

Jerheme Urban has served as head coach of the football team since 2014. Coach Urban played football and ran track at Trinity University and was a football All-American. After graduating from Trinity in 2003, Coach Urban had a nine-year career in the NFL. In 2019, Coach Urban was inducted into the Trinity University Athletics Hall of Fame.

=== Mississippi Miracle ===
Trinity athletics may be most famous for the "Mississippi Miracle" executed by the Tiger football team in the 2007 Trinity vs. Millsaps football game. On October 27, 2007, in a game played in Jackson, Mississippi, against conference rival Millsaps College, Trinity trailed by two points with two seconds left. With time for only one more play and being too far way for a field goal, the Tigers ran the "hook and lateral play," in which a receiver runs a short hook route, and then laterals the ball to a trailing player. After the first lateral the Millsaps defense was not fooled and seemed about to tackle the ball carrier and end the game.

At this point the Tigers showed their knowledge of rugby by lining up across the field, rather than gathering in front of the ball carrier as is typical in American football. This meant that there was always a Tiger player in position, either even with or behind the ball carrier, to legally receive another lateral. Every time the Millsaps defense closed on the ball carrier the Trinity player was able to complete a legal lateral to a teammate. In what ESPN said may have been the "longest play in football history," in terms of time elapsed (sixty seconds exactly), Trinity completed 15 laterals before breaking through the Millsaps defense for a 61-yard touchdown. The score, known in Jackson, MS as the "Major Disaster," (Millsaps' nickname is "The Majors") gave Trinity the victory and ultimately led to the conference championship.

The Trinity community is especially proud of this play because it demonstrated not only the Tigers' athletic ability, but also their intelligence and poise under pressure. The unlikely play was named the top sports moment of the year by Time magazine as well as the "Game Changing Performance of the Year" by Pontiac.

=== Conferences ===
- Gulf Coast Conference (1947–1956)
- Independent (1957–1962)
- Southland Conference (1963–1972)
- Independent (1972–1988)
- Southern Collegiate Athletic Conference (1989–2016)
- Southern Athletic Association (2017–present)
