= Southern Collegiate Athletic Conference =

NCAA Division III athletic conference

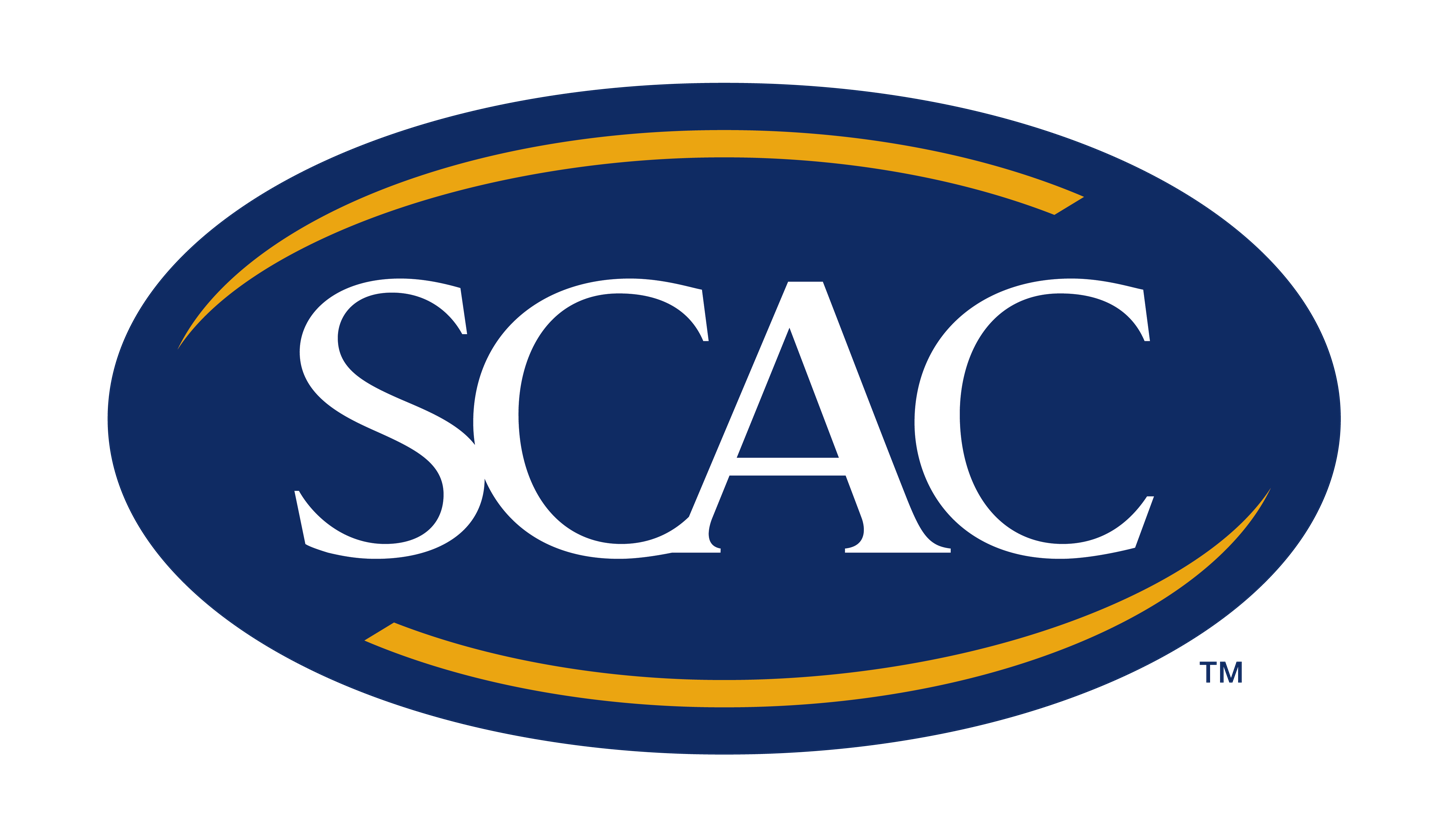
- Formerly: College Athletic Conference (1962–1991)
- Association: NCAA
- Founded: 1962
- Commissioner: D. Dwayne Hanberry
- Sports fielded: 19; men's: 9; women's: 10
- Division: Division III
- No. of teams: 10 (12 in 2027)
- Headquarters: Suwanee, Georgia
- Website: www.scacsports.com

Locations

The Southern Collegiate Athletic Conference (SCAC), founded in 1962, is an intercollegiate athletic conference which competes in the NCAA's Division III. Member institutions are located in Arkansas, Colorado, Louisiana, and Texas. Difficulties related to travel distances led seven former members to announce the formation of a new Southeastern US-based conference, the Southern Athletic Association, starting with the 2012–13 academic year.

Prior to 1991, the conference was known as the College Athletic Conference (CAC). The commissioner of the SCAC is Dwayne Hanberry. The chair of the Executive Committee of the SCAC for 2026–27 is Christopher Holoman, Centenary College president.

== History ==
Southern Collegiate Athletic Conference
Location of SCAC members
– Full member
– Affiliate member
– Future member

=== Recent events ===
On November 1, 2022, McMurry University will join as a full member in the fall of the 2024–25 academic year.

On March 9, 2023, Trinity University and Southwestern University of Texas announced their departure from the SCAC, joining the Southern Athletic Association (SAA) beginning the 2025–26 academic year.

On May 15, 2023, the SCAC announced that Concordia University of Texas and the University of the Ozarks will join the conference, beginning in the 2024–25 academic year.

On November 24, 2023, Lyon College joined the SCAC as an affiliate member for football, beginning in the 2024 season of 2024–25 academic year.

On April 26, 2024, the SCAC announced that LeTourneau University would join the conference, beginning in the 2025–26 academic year.

On June 11, 2024, Hendrix College announced it would return to the SCAC, beginning in the 2025–26 academic year.

On March 17, 2025, various outlets reported that McMurry University and Schreiner University would leave the SCAC for the American Southwest Conference (ASC) at the end of the 2025–26 academic year in exchange for a seven-figure sum. On March 18, 2025, these reports were later confirmed by the ASC and SCAC.

On April 16, 2026, the SCAC announced they will add Gallaudet University as an affiliate member for football, thus retaining its automatic bid to the NCAA Division III football championship, beginning in the 2026 fall season of the 2026–27 academic year. Gallaudet will not routinely participate in regular-season SCAC play, appearing only in the conference's regular season-ending football tournament. Its 2026 football schedule shows no SCAC opponents until the final week.

=== Chronological timeline ===
- 1962 – On September 1, 1962, the SCAC was founded as the College Athletic Conference (CAC). Charter members included Centre College, Southwestern University at Memphis, The University of the South of Sewanee and Washington and Lee University, which later added Washington University in St. Louis during that same year; beginning the 1962–63 academic year.
- 1972 – Washington (Mo.) [a.k.a. WashU] left the CAC after the 1971–72 academic year.
- 1973 – Washington and Lee left the CAC after the 1972–73 academic year.
- 1974 – Principia College and Rose–Hulman Institute of Technology joined the CAC in the 1974–75 academic year.
- 1980 – Illinois College joined the CAC in the 1980–81 academic year.
- 1983 – Illinois College left the CAC after the 1982–83 academic year.
- 1983 – Fisk University joined the CAC in the 1983–84 academic year.
- 1984:
  - Principia left the CAC after the 1983–84 academic year.
  - Earlham College joined the CAC in the 1984–85 academic year.
- 1989:
  - Two institutions left the CAC to join their future respective primary home conferences, both effective after the 1988–89 academic year:
    - Earlham to join the North Coast Athletic Conference (NCAC)
    - and Rose–Hulman to the Heartland Collegiate Athletic Conference (HCAC)
  - Millsaps College and Trinity University of Texas joined the CAC in the 1989–90 academic year.
- 1990 – Oglethorpe University joined the CAC in the 1990–91 academic year.
- 1991:
  - The CAC was re-designated as the Southern Collegiate Athletic Conference (SCAC), while women's programs became part of the SCAC, beginning in the 1991–92 academic year.
  - Hendrix College joined the SCAC in the 1991–92 academic year.
- 1994:
  - Fisk left the SCAC to join the National Association of Intercollegiate Athletics (NAIA) as an Independent after the 1993–94 academic year.
  - Southwestern University of Texas joined the SCAC in the 1994–95 academic year.
- 1998 – DePauw University joined the SCAC (with Rose–Hulman rejoining) in the 1998–99 academic year.
- 2006:
  - Rose–Hulman left the SCAC again to rejoin the HCAC after the 2005–06 academic year.
    - Austin College and Colorado College joined the SCAC in the 2006–07 academic year.
- 2007 – Birmingham–Southern College joined the SCAC in the 2007–08 academic year.
- 2011:
  - DePauw left the SCAC to join the NCAC after the 2010–11 academic year.
  - The University of Dallas joined the SCAC in the 2011–12 academic year.
- 2012:
  - Centre, Rhodes, Sewanee, Millsaps, Oglethorpe, Hendrix and Birmingham–Southern left the SCAC, to form the Southern Athletic Association (SAA), along with NCAA D-III Independent Berry College, all effective after the 2011–12 academic year.
  - The Centenary College of Louisiana joined the SCAC in the 2012–13 academic year.
- 2013:
  - Schreiner University and Texas Lutheran joined the SCAC in the 2013–14 academic year.
  - The University of California, Santa Cruz joined the SCAC as an affiliate member for men's and women's swimming & diving in the 2013–14 academic year.
- 2014 – UC Santa Cruz left the SCAC as an affiliate member for men's and women's swimming & diving after the 2013–14 academic year.
- 2016 – McMurry University and the University of the Ozarks joined the SCAC as affiliate members for men's and women's swimming & diving in the 2016–17 academic year.
- 2018 – The Denver campus of Johnson & Wales University joined the SCAC in the 2018–19 academic year.
- 2019 – The University of St. Thomas joined the SCAC in the 2019–20 academic year.
- 2020 – Johnson & Wales–Denver left the SCAC after the 2019–20 academic year; as the school ceased operations.
- 2024:
  - Concordia University of Texas, McMurry University and the University of the Ozarks joined the SCAC in the 2024–25 academic year.
  - Lyon College joined the SCAC as an affiliate member for football in the 2024 season (2024–25 academic year).
- 2025:
  - Trinity (Tex.) and Southwestern (Tex.) left the SCAC to join the Southern Athletic Association (SAA) after the 2024–25 academic year.
  - LeTourneau University joined the SCAC (with Hendrix rejoining) in the 2025–26 academic year.
- 2026:
  - McMurry and Schreiner left the SCAC to rejoin the ASC after the 2025–26 academic year.
  - Gallaudet University joined the SCAC as an affiliate member for football, beginning the 2026 fall season (2026–27 academic year).
- 2027 – Millsaps and Southwestern (Tex.) will rejoin the SCAC in the 2027–28 academic year.

== Member schools ==
=== Current members ===
The SCAC currently has 10 full members, all are private schools:

Institution	Location	Founded	Affiliation	Enrollment	U.S. News Ranking	Endowment	Nickname	Joined (Note: Represents the calendar year when fall sports competition begins.)	Colors	Football
Austin College	Sherman, Texas	1849	Presbyterian	1,228	82 (National: Lib. Arts)	$134,746,000	Kangaroos	2006		Yes
Centenary College of Louisiana	Shreveport, Louisiana	1825	United Methodist	563	167 (National: Lib. Arts)	$122,482,000	Gentlemen & Ladies	2012		Yes
Colorado College	Colorado Springs, Colorado	1874	Nonsectarian	2,266	31 (National: Lib. Arts)	$720,085,000	Tigers	2006		No
Concordia University Texas	Austin, Texas	1926	Lutheran LCMS	1,200	not ranked	$18,570,000	Tornados	2024		No
University of Dallas	Irving, Texas	1956	Catholic	2,538	13 (Regional: West)	$45,630,000	Crusaders	2011		No
Hendrix College	Conway, Arkansas	1876	United Methodist	1,130		$200,700,000	Warriors	1992; 2025 (Note: Hendrix left the SCAC after the 2011–12 school year; before rejoining in the 2025–26 school year.)		Yes
LeTourneau University	Longview, Texas	1946	Interdenominational	3,758		$10,500,000	Yellowjackets	2025		No
University of the Ozarks	Clarksville, Arkansas	1834	Presbyterian	630	6 (Regional College: South)	$87,540,000	Eagles	2024		No
University of St. Thomas	Houston, Texas	1947	Catholic (Basilian Fathers)	3,975	26 (Regional University: West)	$78,360,000	Celts	2019		No
Texas Lutheran University	Seguin, Texas	1891	Lutheran ELCA	1,442	3 (Regional College: West)	$89,986,000	Bulldogs	2013		Yes

=== Affiliate members ===
The SCAC currently has two affiliate members.

Institution	Location	Founded	Affiliation	Enrollment	Nickname	Joined (Note: Represents the calendar year when fall sports competition begins.)	Colors	SCAC sport(s)	Primary conference
Gallaudet University	Washington, D.C.	1864	Quasigovernmental	1,740	Bison	2026		Football	United East (UEC)
Lyon College	Batesville, Arkansas	1872	Presbyterian (PCUSA)	496	Scots	2024		Football	St. Louis (SLIAC)

=== Future full members ===
Institution	Location	Founded	Affiliation	Enrollment	Endowment	Nickname	Joining (Note: Represents the calendar year when fall sports competition begins.)	Colors	Current conference
Millsaps College	Jackson, Mississippi	1890	United Methodist	584	$115,460,000	Majors	2027 (Note: Millsaps was a full member of the SCAC from 1989 to 2012 before rejoining the conference beginning in 2027.)		Southern (SAA)
Southwestern University	Georgetown, Texas	1840	United Methodist	1,434	$403,500,000	Pirates	2027 (Note: Southwestern was a full member of the SCAC from 1994 to 2025 before rejoining the conference beginning in 2027.)		Southern (SAA)

=== Former members ===
The SCAC had 20 former full members, all were private schools:

Institution	Location	Founded	Affiliation	Enrollment	Nickname	Joined (Note: Represents the calendar year when fall sports competition begins.)	Left (Note: Represents the calendar year when spring sports competition ends.)	Current conference
Birmingham–Southern College	Birmingham, Alabama	1856	United Methodist	1,600	Panthers	2007	2012	Defunct (Note: Birmingham–Southern closed after the 2023–24 academic year.)
Centre College	Danville, Kentucky	1819	Presbyterian	1,215	Colonels	1962	2012	Southern (SAA)
DePauw University	Greencastle, Indiana	1837	Methodist	2,400	Tigers	1998	2011	North Coast (NCAC)
Earlham College	Richmond, Indiana	1847	Quakers	1,181	Quakers	1984	1989	Heartland (HCAC)
Fisk University	Nashville, Tennessee	1866	United Church of Christ (Note: Also a historically black college and university.)	800	Bulldogs	1983	1994	HBCU (HBCUAC) (Note: Currently an NAIA athletic conference.)
Hendrix College	Conway, Arkansas	1876	United Methodist	1,400	Warriors	1992	2012	Southern (SAA)
Illinois College	Jacksonville, Illinois	1829	UCC & PCUSA	1,000	Blueboys & Lady Blues	1980	1983	Midwest
Johnson & Wales University–Denver	Denver, Colorado	1914	Nonsectarian	1,291	Wildcats	2018	2020	Defunct (Note: Johnson & Wales–Denver discontinued its athletic program after the 2019–20 school year. Later the school closed in 2020.)
McMurry University	Abilene, Texas	1923	United Methodist	1,430	War Hawks	2024	2026	American Southwest (ASC)
Millsaps College	Jackson, Mississippi	1890	United Methodist	1,146	Majors	1989	2012	Southern (SAA)
Oglethorpe University	Atlanta, Georgia	1835	Nondenominational	1,000	Stormy Petrels	1991	2012	Southern (SAA)
Principia College	Elsah, Illinois	1910	Scientist	550	Panthers	1974	1984	St. Louis (SLIAC)
Rhodes College	Memphis, Tennessee	1848	Presbyterian	1,690	Lynx	1962	2012	Southern (SAA)
Rose–Hulman Institute of Technology	Terre Haute, Indiana	1874	Nonsectarian	1,970	Fightin'; Engineers	1974; 1998	1989; 2006	Heartland (HCAC)
Sewanee: The University of the South	Sewanee, Tennessee	1857	Episcopal	1,383	Tigers	1962	2012	Southern (SAA)
Schreiner University	Kerrville, Texas	1923	Presbyterian	1,103	Mountaineers	2013	2026	American Southwest (ASC)
Southwestern University	Georgetown, Texas	1840	United Methodist	1,536	Pirates	1994	2025	Southern (SAA)
Trinity University	San Antonio, Texas	1869	Nonsectarian (Note: Partially affiliated with the Presbyterian Church.)	2,703	Tigers	1989	2025	Southern (SAA)
Washington and Lee University	Lexington, Virginia	1749	Nonsectarian	2,203	Generals	1962	1973	Old Dominion (ODAC)
Washington University in St. Louis	St. Louis, Missouri	1853	Nonsectarian	14,070	Bears	1962	1972	University (UAA)

=== Former affiliate members ===
The SCAC had three former affiliate members, all but one were private schools.

Institution	Location	Founded	Affiliation	Enrollment	Nickname	Joined (Note: Represents the calendar year when fall sports competition begins.)	Left (Note: Represents the calendar year when spring sports competition ends.)	SCAC sport(s)	Primary conference
McMurry University	Abilene, Texas	1923	United Methodist	1,430	War Hawks	2014	2024	Men's swimming & diving	American Southwest (ASC)
McMurry University	Abilene, Texas	1923	United Methodist	1,430	War Hawks	2014	2024	Women's swimming & diving	American Southwest (ASC)
University of the Ozarks	Clarksville, Arkansas	1834	Presbyterian	630	Eagles	2016	2024	Men's swimming & diving	Southern (SCAC)
University of the Ozarks	Clarksville, Arkansas	1834	Presbyterian	630	Eagles	2016	2024	Women's swimming & diving	Southern (SCAC)
University of California, Santa Cruz (UCSC, UC Santa Cruz)	Santa Cruz, California	1965	Public	19,700	Banana Slugs	2013	2014	Men's swimming & diving	Coast to Coast (C2C)
University of California, Santa Cruz (UCSC, UC Santa Cruz)	Santa Cruz, California	1965	Public	19,700	Banana Slugs	2013	2014	Women's swimming & diving	Coast to Coast (C2C)

=== Membership timeline ===
Full member (all sports) Full member (non-football) Associate member (football) Associate member (sport)

== Conference overview ==
Prior to the 2012 conference split, the SCAC fielded competition in baseball, basketball, cross country, field hockey, football, golf, lacrosse, soccer, softball, swimming and diving, tennis, outdoor track and field and volleyball. With membership greatly reduced and in flux, some of these sports (field hockey, women's lacrosse) no longer have enough participants (zero and two, respectively) to allow the conference to sponsor them. In addition, after struggling with only four football playing schools for several seasons, the conference in November 2015 announced football would be discontinued as a conference sport effective the 2017–18 school year, with football playing institutions affiliating with either the American Southwest Conference or the Southern Athletic Association. On July 21, 2018, the conference announced that men's and women's lacrosse would once again be offered as conference sports, and made a commitment to holding an eSports championship in 2019. With only four schools fielding women's lacrosse teams, and five men's, the conference champions will not qualify for an automatic bid to the NCAA playoffs.

Unlike many Division III conferences, where geography is the primary determining factor for membership, the SCAC is made up of private institutions where the primary focus is on academics; the New England Small College Athletic Conference and University Athletic Association are other athletic associations with similar academic emphasis. Almost all members sport Phi Beta Kappa chapters. Member schools are prominently featured in annual "Best College" rankings; admissions are highly selective. With time and the formation of the SAA from many of the SCAC's formerly selective schools, the emphasis on academics has been reduced in recent years.

In an unusual move for the conference, Colorado College, which offers two Division I (scholarship) sports, was accepted as a member beginning in the 2006–07 season. It is the only SCAC school to offer any sort of scholarship athletics, though the Division I programs—namely men's ice hockey and women's soccer—do not compete in the SCAC. (The conference does not sponsor ice hockey for either men or women.)

The conference had previously announced its desire to expand to a total of twelve members, which would ease scheduling issues and allow the conference to divide into eastern and western divisions spread across the southern US. On May 26, 2006, Birmingham-Southern College, one of the smallest Division I schools in the country, announced its intentions to drop scholarship athletics and join the SCAC. This is a multi-year process subject to final approval by the NCAA. The SCAC approved BSC's application, pending NCAA approval, on June 8, 2006.

Due to the unusual (for Division III) distances between member institutions, travel costs and durations must be factored into any decision to join the conference. Rose–Hulman cited these factors as reasons for leaving the conference when it rejoined the Heartland Collegiate Athletic Conference in 2006–07. Austin College readily took RHIT's place, moving from the American Southwest Conference before the 2006–07 season.

On June 9, 2010, DePauw University announced that it was departing the SCAC for the North Coast Athletic Conference. Like Rose-Hulman, DePauw cited "a less strenuous and more environmentally friendly travel regimen for our teams." DePauw became a member of the NCAC for the 2011–12 season except for football, which will join for the 2012 season.

On September 22, 2010, the University of Dallas announced that it had accepted an invitation to join the SCAC at the beginning of the 2011–12 academic year.

The May 10, 2011 issue of the DePauw college newspaper, The DePauw, reported that four schools (Centre, Sewanee, Hendrix, and Rhodes) were considering leaving the conference at the end of the 2011–2012 school year, ostensibly due to travel issues and issues relating to the conference splitting into two divisions. As the two reasons were somewhat exclusive (e.g. divisions would reduce overall travel), and other regional conferences would offer similar issues, it remained to be seen at that time what the schools planned in a post-SCAC world.

After the conclusion of the June 7, 2011 SCAC Presidents' meeting, the conference announced that seven of the twelve schools would be leaving to form a new, more compact conference based in the Southeastern US. This transition was effective at the conclusion of the 2011–12 academic year. The schools departing include founding SCAC [CAC] members Centre, Sewanee, and Rhodes, in addition to Birmingham-Southern, Hendrix, Millsaps, and Oglethorpe. Berry College will also join the newly formed Southern Athletic Association.

The SCAC intends to remain a viable entity, enlisting other schools which subscribe to the SCAC charter. Commissioner D. Dwayne Hanberry will remain with the conference to oversee that effort, which will be complicated by the paucity of unaffiliated Division III schools in the SCAC's new region of Texas and Colorado. Reflecting that challenge, the conference has sought new members from the American Southwest Conference, whose geographical footprint is similar to that of the "new" SCAC. On September 28, 2011, Centenary College of Louisiana announced it would join the SCAC beginning in the 2012–13 season. Two more ASC schools joined the SCAC for the 2013–14 season: Schreiner University announced their decision on January 23, 2012, and on February 16, 2012, Texas Lutheran University announced it too would join the SCAC.

Football was no longer be sponsored by the SCAC as of the 2017–18 school year. The conference had four schools playing in 2015 and 2016: Texas Lutheran University, Austin College, Southwestern University and Trinity University. Texas Lutheran University and Southwestern University will play football as affiliates in the ASC, while Austin College and Trinity University will be affiliates of the Southern Athletic Association.

A much-needed travel partner for isolated Colorado College will join the conference in 2018. On February 21, 2017, the conference announced that the Denver campus of Johnson & Wales University would join the conference as it transitions from the NAIA to NCAA Division III, after the school's "exploratory year" in 2017–18. It is expected that the school will not be eligible for conference championships or NCAA playoff bids until the transition to Division III is complete, per typical NCAA practice. The conference has already announced plans to pursue a tenth institution to better balance travel and scheduling requirements.

On February 14, 2018, the University of St. Thomas - Houston announced it would become the SCAC's 10th member after completing an exploratory year in Division III. SCAC competition would begin in the 2019–2020 season.

On June 25, 2020, Johnson & Wales University announced that it would close its Denver campus at the end of the 2020–21 school year due to concerns related to the COVID-19 pandemic, and would accept no new students at that campus effective immediately. The following day, the Denver athletic program was shut down.

On October 31, 2022, the conference announced that McMurry University, currently an affiliate in Men's and Women's Swimming and Diving, would join the conference as a full member starting with the 2024–25 season, becoming the latest school to leave the American Southwest Conference for the SCAC. As McMurry offers football, there was speculation that the conference might once again sponsor the sport; two days later, the conference announced it would reinstate football in 2024 as long as at least four members agree to participate in SCAC play. Austin, Southwestern, Texas Lutheran, and Trinity all are affiliated with other conferences for football and will have to complete any commitments before returning to the SCAC; in addition to McMurry, Centenary and Schreiner have nascent programs which could be ready to compete by 2024. Finally the SCAC also announced that Lyon College will join as an associate for football only in 2024. The conference expects Lyon, Austin, Centenary, and McMurry at a minimum in 2024 with the other schools having until 2026 to return to SCAC play. The conference's football champion will not earn an automatic bid to the NCAA playoffs until the first year six teams participate in SCAC competition.

On March 9, 2023, the conference's plans to restart football were somewhat complicated by the announcement that Trinity and Southwestern would leave the SCAC in favor of the Southern Athletic Association with the beginning of the 2025-26 school year. While the conference will retain enough football-playing schools to receive an automatic bid (if and only the remaining six teams meet their commitments to play football at that time), it may give the conference reason to join forces with the American Southwest Conference, which by that time will only have four schools participating in the sport and thus lack the minimum number of teams to receive an automatic playoff bid. However, with the startling announcement that Gallaudet would affiliate in football only beginning in '26-'27, and playing only in the season-ending conference festival, there is no immediate need to join forces with the ASC.

== Sports ==
A divisional format was used for baseball, basketball (M / W), softball, and volleyball (W), until after the 2024–25 school year.
Blue
- Austin College
- Centenary (La.)
- Colorado College
- Dallas
- Ozarks (Ark.)
- St. Thomas (Tex.)
Gold
- Concordia–Texas
- McMurry
- Schreiner
- Southwestern (Tex.)
- Texas Lutheran
- Trinity (Tex.)

The SCAC sponsors intercollegiate athletic competition in the following sports:

Conference sports
Sport	Men's	Women's
Baseball	Yes	No
Basketball	Yes	Yes
Cross country	Yes	Yes
Esports	Yes (Co-ed)	Yes (Co-ed)
Football	Yes	No
Golf	Yes	Yes
Soccer	Yes	Yes
Softball	No	Yes
Swimming & Diving	Yes	Yes
Tennis	Yes	Yes
Track and field	Yes	Yes
Volleyball	No	Yes

== President's Trophy ==
Each year, the "President's Trophy," a 300-pound railroad bell, is awarded to the school with the best overall sports record. Teams are awarded points for their final position in each sport; the school with the most points is declared the winner. For the 2026-27 school year, the President's Trophy was awarded to St. Thomas (TX) for the first time. The 7.5-point margin of victory over second-place Texas Lutheran was the smallest in almost two decades. St. Thomas' victory was the first time since the '91-'92 season that the award was earned by a school other than the now departed DePauw or Trinity(TX).

== NCAA national championship teams and individuals ==
SCAC members have won a total of ten NCAA team championships and 35 individual championships.

Team champions:

- 1999–00: Men's Tennis (Trinity); Women's Tennis (Trinity)
- 2002–03: Women's Basketball (Trinity), Men's Soccer (Trinity)
- 2006–07: Women's Basketball (DePauw)
- 2008–09: Men's Golf (Oglethorpe)
- 2011–12: Men's Golf (Oglethorpe)
- 2013–14: Men's Golf (Schreiner)
- 2015-16: Men's Baseball (Trinity)
- 2018-19: Women's Softball (Texas Lutheran)

Individual champions:

- 1979–80: Men's 400 IM (Chris Fugman, Centre)
- 1981-82: Men's cross country (Mark Whalley, Principia)
- 1983–84: Men's javelin, outdoor (Chris Trapp, Rose-Hulman)
- 1984–85: Men's javelin, outdoor (Chris Trapp, Rose-Hulman)
- 1985–86: Men's javelin, outdoor (Chris Trapp, Rose-Hulman)
- 1995–96: Women's tennis, singles (Nao Kinoshita, Rhodes)
- 1996–97: Women's tennis, singles (Nao Kinoshita, Rhodes); Women's tennis, doubles (Kinoshita, Taylor Tarver, Rhodes)
- 1997–98: Men's pole vault, indoor (Ryan Loftus, Rose-Hulman)
- 1999–00: Women's 1500 meters, indoor (Heather Stone, Sewanee); Women's 1500 meters, outdoor (Stone, Sewanee)
- 2002–03: Men's 100 breaststroke (Matt Smith, Rose-Hulman)
- 2003–04: Women's high jump, outdoor (Christyn Schumann, Trinity)
- 2004–05: Women's high jump, indoor (Christyn Schumann, Trinity); Women's high jump, outdoor (Schumann, Trinity)
- 2005–06: Women's high jump, outdoor (Christyn Schumann, Trinity)
- 2006–07: Women's tennis, singles (Liz Bondi, DePauw)
- 2008–09: Men's pentathlon, indoor (Todd Wildman, Trinity); Men's golf, medalist (Olafur Loftsson, Oglethorpe); Men's triple jump, outdoor (Chrys Jones, Centre)
- 2009–10: Men's pentathlon, indoor (Todd Wildman, Trinity); Men's triple jump, indoor (Chrys Jones, Centre); Men's triple jump, outdoor (Chrys Jones, Centre); Women's 1-meter diving (Lindsay Martin, Trinity); Women's 3-meter diving (Hayley Emerick, Trinity)
- 2010–11: Men's triple jump, indoor (Chrys Jones, Centre); Men's golf, medalist (Chris Morris, Centre)
- 2011–12: Women's 60 meter hurdles, indoor (Tiarra Goode, Birmingham-Southern); Men's 200 freestyle (Jordan DeGayner, Colorado College); Women's 3-meter diving (Ruth Hahn, Trinity); Men's golf, medalist (Anthony Maccaglia, Oglethorpe); Women's 100 meter hurdles, outdoor (Tiarra Goode, Birmingham-Southern)
- 2013–14: Men's 100 freestyle (Stephen Culberson, Trinity)
- 2016-17: Men's 400 meter run, indoor (Marquis Brown, Texas Lutheran)
- 2023-24: Women's 400 meter individual medley (Neely Burns, Trinity University)

This list does not include championships won by schools outside of their period of membership in the SCAC.

== Overall success on the national level ==
While championships come infrequently, overall SCAC athletic programs rate favorably when compared against the diverse Division III membership. The Learfield IMG College Directors' Cup provides one representation of any school's athletic success as compared to its peers. Trinity(TX) ranked in the top five nationally twice during its time in the conference, most recently in 2004–05 when it placed fourth. Colorado College led the conference in '25-'26 when it finished 45th, the only SCAC entry in the top 100.

== The SCAC and Division I ==
On several occasions the SCAC has been used as a role model for academically high-achieving Division I programs considering a move to non-scholarship athletics. In 2004, Rice considered a move to Division III with Trinity cited as a possible model by the Houston Chronicle. The university eventually remained in Division I. In 2006, Birmingham–Southern College elected to leave Division I for Division III, and stated that they would seek membership in the SCAC. This represented the first time since 1988 that a Division I school had changed affiliation to Division III. In 2012, Centenary College of Louisiana joined the SCAC, after leaving Division I in 2011; however, its initial partner in the transition from Division I was the American Southwest Conference.
