= Coby Gipson =

American football coach (born c. 1980)

Current position
- Title: Head coach
- Team: Howard Payne
- Conference: ASC
- Record: 10–9

Biographical details
- Born: c. 1980 (age 45–46); Longview, Texas, U.S.
- Education: LeTourneau University; Concordia University Irvine

Playing career

Baseball
- 1999–2002: LeTourneau
- Position: Pitcher

Coaching career (HC unless noted)

Football
- 2010–2011: Grace Community HS (TX) (OC)
- 2012–2016: Bishop Gorman HS (TX)
- 2017–2018: Howard Payne (OC/QB)
- 2019: East Texas Baptist (DL)
- 2020–2021: Lamar (RB/RC)
- 2022–2024: Lamar (WR/RC)
- 2025–present: Howard Payne

Softball
- 2009–2016: UT Tyler (assistant)

Head coaching record
- Overall: 10–9 (college); 30–25 (high school) (Note: Year-by-year records from MaxPreps shows an overall record of 30–25, but later sources list his record as 28–17.)

Coby Gipson (born c. 1980) is an American college football coach. He is the head football coach for Howard Payne University, a position he has held since 2025. He was the head football coach for Bishop Thomas K. Gorman Catholic School from 2012 to 2016. He also coached football for Grace Community High School, East Texas Baptist, and Lamar, and also coached college softball for UT Tyler. He played college baseball for LeTourneau as a pitcher.

== Playing career and education ==
Gipson grew up in Longview, Texas, and attended LeTourneau University. He was a member of the school's baseball team as a pitcher.

In the early 1970s, Gipson's parents met while they were attending Howard Payne University in Brownwood, Texas.

Gipson received his bachelor's degree from LeTourneau and later received his master's degree from Concordia University Irvine.

== Coaching career ==
In 2010, Gipson began his coaching career as the offensive coordinator for Grace Community High School. During the 2011 season, he helped lead the team to the Texas Association of Private and Parochial Schools (TAPPS) semifinal. After two seasons in 2012, he was hired as the head football coach for Bishop Thomas K. Gorman Catholic School in Tyler, Texas. In five seasons as head coach, Gipson led the team to an overall record of 30–25, three consecutive playoff appearances, the best four-year winning percentage in the school's 60-year history, and a 2014 appearance in the TAPPS semifinal.

While coaching at Grace Community and Bishop Gorman, Gipson was an assistant softball coach for the University of Texas at Tyler. He helped lead the team to an NCAA Division III softball title in 2016.

In 2017, Gipson was hired as the offensive coordinator and quarterbacks coach for Howard Payne University. He served on the staff for two seasons before becoming the defensive line coach for East Texas Baptist University.

In 2020, Gipson joined Lamar University as the running backs coach and recruiting coordinator under head coach Blane Morgan. In 2022, Gipson transitioned to wide receivers coach while retaining his role as recruiting coordinator. He was retained when Peter Rossomando was hired in 2023. Former NFL quarterback Josh McCown praised Gipson's coaching ability as McCown's son, Aiden, was a quarterback for the team.

In 2025, Gipson returned to Howard Payne as the school's head football coach.

Upon accepting the role, Gipson said:

"(I'm) very sad to leave Lamar and Beaumont, which has been our home for five years. It's been an honor to be at Lamar and be part of this turnaround under Coach Rossomando's incredible leadership. I Have had a front-row view of a head coach academy working for him...Now it's time to go to HPU and build upon the success of men like Vance Gibson, Roger Geise, Hunter Sims, Braxton Harris, Jason Bachtel, and Kevin Bachtel. Sting 'em."

Lamar coach Rossomando spoke of Gipson's departure:

"Coby has been an integral part of the resurgence of Lamar football...He is a top-notch recruiter, an excellent football coach, and a terrific Christian man. Howard Payne got a great one. We wish Coby and his family well."

Gipson took over a Howard Payne team coming off of a 1–8 record under Kevin Bachtel in 2024 as the team had to play a double round-robin schedule in the American Southwest Conference (ASC) against East Texas Baptist, Hardin–Simmons, and Mary Hardin–Baylor.

== Personal life ==
Gipson is a Christian. His wife, Christy, is a nursing professor at UT Tyler. Together, they have three children.

== Head coaching record ==
=== College ===
Year	Team	Overall	Conference	Standing	Bowl/playoffs
Howard Payne Yellow Jackets (American Southwest Conference) (2025–present)
2025	Howard Payne	4–6	2–4	3rd	
2026	Howard Payne	6–3	2–3	4th	
Howard Payne:		10–9	4–7		
Total:		10–9			

=== High school ===
Year	Team	Overall	Conference	Standing	Bowl/playoffs
Bishop Gorman Crusaders () (2012–2016)
2012	Bishop Gorman	2–8	1–6	7th	
2013	Bishop Gorman	5–5	3–4	5th	
2014	Bishop Gorman	10–3	5–2	3rd	
2015	Bishop Gorman	8–3	5–2	3rd	
2016	Bishop Gorman	5–6	3–3	4th	
Bishop Gorman:		30–25	17–17		
Total:		30–25			
National championship Conference title Conference division title or championship game berth
