= Steve Fanara =

American football player and coach (born 1966)

Current position
- Title: Assistant coach
- Team: McNeil HS (TX)

Biographical details
- Born: August 30, 1966 (age 60)

Playing career
- c. 1987: Southwest Baptist
- Position: Defensive back

Coaching career (HC unless noted)
- ?: Southwest Baptist (assistant)
- ?: MidAmerica Nazarene (assistant)
- 1996–?: Ruskin HS (MO)
- ?–2000: Warrensburg HS (MO)
- 2001: De Soto HS (MO)
- 2002–2003: West Point Prep (NJ) (DC)
- 2004: Oakville HS (MO)
- 2005–2007: Howard Payne (DC)
- 2008–2011: Howard Payne
- 2012: Brownwood HS (TX) (DB)
- 2013: Southeastern Oklahoma State (WR)
- 2014–2015: Early HS (TX) (assistant)
- 2017–2019: Vandegrift HS (TX) (assistant)
- 2020-present: McNeil HS (TX) (DC)

Head coaching record
- Overall: 9–31 (college)

Steve Fanara (born August 30, 1966) is an American football coach. He served as the head football coach at Howard Payne University in Brownwood, Texas for four seasons, from 2008 to 2011. Before being named to the post, he was the defensive coordinator at Howard Payne under the previous head coach, Mike Redwine.

== Personal life ==
Fanara earned his bachelor's degree at Southwest Baptist University in Bolivar, Missouri, where he played football for two seasons before beginning his coaching career as a student assistant. Fanara also holds a master's degree from MidAmerica Nazarene University.

== Head coaching record ==
=== College ===
Year	Team	Overall	Conference	Standing	Bowl/playoffs
Howard Payne Yellow Jackets (American Southwest Conference) (2008–2011)
2008	Howard Payne	2–8	1–7	8th	
2009	Howard Payne	4–6	2–6	T–7th	
2010	Howard Payne	2–8	1–7	T–8th	
2011	Howard Payne	1–9	1–7	T–8th	
Howard Payne:		9–31	5–27		
Total:		9–31			
