= Don Shepard Park =

Baseball park in Brownwood, Texas, US

- Interactive map of Don Shepard Park
- Full name: Don Shepard Park
- Location: 1900 Center Street; Brownwood, Texas; 76801
- Coordinates: 31.71005°N 98.99265°W
- Surface: Grass

Don Shepard Park is a baseball park located in Brownwood, Texas, and home to the Howard Payne University Yellowjackets baseball team of the American Southwest Conference. The venue underwent upgrades in the fall of 2008 estimated to be at the expense of $30,000.
