= Bill Anderson (American football, born 1925) =

American football player and coach (1925–2013)

Biographical details
- Born: July 20, 1925; Erath County, Texas, U.S.
- Died: February 20, 2013 (aged 87); Brownwood, Texas, U.S.

Playing career
- 1947–1949: Pepperdine

Coaching career (HC unless noted)
- 1953–1966: Stamford HS (TX) (assistant)
- 1967–1968: Stamford HS (TX)
- 1969–1970: Abilene Christian (assistant)
- 1971–1972: Graham HS (TX)
- 1973: Cisco (assistant)
- 1974–1976: Stamford HS (TX)
- 1977: Westwood HS (Palestine, TX)
- 1978–1981: Cisco
- 1982: West Texas A&M (assistant)
- 1984–1985: Howard Payne (OC)
- 1986–1987: Tarleton State (OC)
- 1988–1991: Howard Payne

Head coaching record
- Overall: 24–18 (college)

Accomplishments and honors

Championships
- 1 TIAA (1989)

Billy Joe Anderson (July 20, 1925 – February 20, 2013) was an American football player and coach. He served as the head football coach at Howard Payne University from 1988 to 1991, compiling a record of 24–18. Anderson was also the head football coach at Cisco Junior College—now known as Cisco College—in Cisco, Texas and at three high schools in the state of Texas: Stamford High School from 1967 to 1968 and 1974 to 1976, Graham High School in 1977, and Westwood High School in Palestine for one season, in 1977.

== Early life, military service, and playing career ==
Anderson was born in Erath County, Texas, on July 20, 1925. During World War II, he trained as B-29 tail gunner in the United States Army Air Forces, but did not serve overseas. After the war, he attended Pepperdine University, where he played college football from 1947 to 1949 before graduating in 1950.

== Coaching career ==
Anderson was an assistant coach at Stamford High School in Stamford, Texas for 14 years before succeeding Larry Wartes in head football coach in 1967. After working as an assistant football coach at Abilene Christian University for two seasons, Anderson was hired, in 1971, as head coach football coach at Graham High School, in Graham, Texas, succeeding Darrell Williams. He was an assistant coach at Cisco Junior College—now known as Cisco College—in Cisco, Texas, in 1973, and then returned to Stamford High School as head football coach in 1974. After three more seasons at Stamford, he spent the 1977 season as head football coach at Westwood High School in Palestine before returning to Cisco Junior College in 1978. Anderson went to Howard Payne University in 1984 as offensive coordinator. He was the offensive coordinator at Tarleton State University from 1986 to 1987 before returning to Howard Payne as head football coach in 1988.

== Death ==
Anderson died on February 20, 2013, in Brownwood, Texas.

== Head coaching record ==
=== College ===
Year	Team	Overall	Conference	Standing	Bowl/playoffs
Howard Payne Yellow Jackets (Texas Intercollegiate Athletic Association) (1988–1991)
1988	Howard Payne	4–7	4–6	T–4th	
1989	Howard Payne	8–3	8–2	T–1st	
1990	Howard Payne	5–5	3–3	T–3rd	
1991	Howard Payne	7–3	3–2	T–2nd	
Howard Payne:		24–18	18–13		
Total:		24–18			
National championship Conference title Conference division title or championship game berth
