= Harold Mayo =

American football coach and college athletics administrator

Biographical details
- Born: c. 1940; McKinney, Texas, U.S.

Playing career
- c. 1960: Kilgore
- 1962: Lamar Tech
- Position: Halfback

Coaching career (HC unless noted)
- 1963: Vidor HS (TX) (assistant)
- 1964: McKinney HS (TX) (assistant)
- 1965–1966: Kilgore HS (TX) (offensive coach)
- 1967: Plano HS (TX) (backfield)
- 1968: Rice (freshmen)
- 1969: Rice (DB)
- 1970: Rice (OB)
- 1971: Taylor HS (TX)
- 1972–1977: Howard Payne (OC)
- 1978: Angelo State (OC)
- 1979–1981: Howard Payne

Administrative career (AD unless noted)
- 1979–1981: Howard Payne

Head coaching record
- Overall: 6–23–1 (college football)

Harold Mayo (born c. 1940) is an American former football coach and college athletics administrator. He was the 14th head football coach for the Howard Payne University in Brownwood, Texas, serving for three seasons, from 1979 to 1981, and compiling a record of 6–23–1.

== Early life and playing career ==
Born in McKinney, Texas, Mayo spent several years of his childhood in Bakersfield, California, before returning to Texas, where he graduated from Farmersville High School in Farmersville. At Farmersville, he was an all-district selection in football, track, and baseball.

Mayo began his college career at the junior college level, playing football as a halfback and running track at Kilgore College in Kilgore, Texas. In football, he was selected as team captain and earned All-American honors. Mayo moved on to Lamar State College of Technology—now known as Lamar University—in Beaumont, Texas, where he again participated in football and track. He was captain of the 1962 Lamar Tech Cardinals football team before graduating in 1963.

== Coaching career ==
Mayo's coaching career began in 1963, when he was an assistant football coach at Vidor High School in Vidor, Texas. The following year he was an assistant football coach and head track and baseball coach at McKinney High School, in Mayo's hometown of McKinney. In 1965, he moved on to Kilgore High School in Kilgore, where he spent two years as offensive coach under head coach Jim Hess. In 1967, Mayo coached the backfield at Plano High School in Plano.

Mayo moved to the college ranks in 1968 when was hired as the head coach of the freshman football team at Rice University in Houston. The following year, he coached the defensive backs for the Rice Owls under head coach Bo Hagan. In 1970, he coached the team's offensive backfield. In 1971, Mayo was hired as the head football coach at Taylor High School in Taylor, Texas. From 1972 to 1977, Mayo was the offensive coordinator at Howard Payne University in Brownwood, Texas, coaching under Dean Slayton. In 1978, he reunited with Hess at Angelo State University in San Angelo, Texas. As offensive coordinator, Mayo helped guide the 1978 Angelo State Rams football team to an NAIA Division I national championship.

In December 1978, Mayo was hired as head football coach and athletic director at Howard Payne, succeeding Slayton. Mayo resigned from his post at Howard Payne in November 1981 and planned to enter private business. In three seasons, he led the Howard Payne Yellow Jackets to a record of 6–23–1.

== Head coaching record ==
=== College football ===
Year	Team	Overall	Conference	Standing	Bowl/playoffs
Howard Payne Yellow Jackets (Lone Star Conference) (1979–1981)
1979	Howard Payne	2–8	1–6	7th	
1980	Howard Payne	1–8–1	0–7	8th	
1981	Howard Payne	3–7	1–6	7th	
Howard Payne:		6–23–1	2–19		
Total:		6–23–1			
