= Jerry Millsapps =

American football player and coach (1933–2022)

Biographical details
- Born: November 13, 1933; Lamesa, Texas, U.S.
- Died: July 9, 2022 (aged 88); Fort Davis, Texas, U.S.

Playing career
- 1952–1955: Howard Payne
- Position: Quarterback

Coaching career (HC unless noted)
- 1958–1960: Lee JHS (TX) (assistant)
- 1961–1963: Lampasas HS (TX) (backfield)
- 1964–1966: Howard Payne (assistant)
- 1967: Pecos HS (TX) (assistant)
- 1968–1978: Pecos HS (TX)
- 1979–1985: Odessa HS (TX)
- 1986–1987: Howard Payne

Head coaching record
- Overall: 5–15 (college)

Jerry Vaughn Millsapps (November 13, 1933 – July 9, 2022) was an American football coach. He was the 16th head football coach for the Howard Payne University in Brownwood, Texas serving for two seasons, from 1986 to 1987, and compiling a record of 5–15.

Millsapps graduated from Lamesa High School in Lamesa, Texas in 1952. He then played college football for four years as a quarterback at Howard Payne before graduating in 1956.

Millsapps died at his home in Fort Davis, Texas, on July 9, 2022, at the age of 88.

== Head coaching record ==
=== College ===
Year	Team	Overall	Conference	Standing	Bowl/playoffs
Howard Payne Yellow Jackets (Lone Star Conference) (1986)
1986	Howard Payne	0–10	0–6	7th	
Howard Payne Yellow Jackets (Texas Intercollegiate Athletic Association) (1987)
1987	Howard Payne	5–5	0–0	NA	
Howard Payne:		5–15			
Total:		5–15			
