= Border Conference =

Former college athletic conference in US

Border Intercollegiate Athletic Association
- Association: NCAA
- Founded: 1931
- Folded: 1962
- Division: University Division
- No. of teams: 6 (final) 9 (total)
- Region: Southwestern United States

Locations

The Border Conference, officially known as the Border Intercollegiate Athletic Association, was an NCAA-affiliated college athletic conference founded in 1931 that disbanded following the 1961–62 school year. Centered in the southwestern United States, the conference included nine member institutions located in the states of Arizona, New Mexico, and Texas.

== History ==
=== Chronological timeline ===
- 1931 – The Border Conference (also known as the Border Intercollegiate Athletic Association) was founded. Charter members included the University of Arizona, Arizona State Teachers College at Flagstaff (now Northern Arizona University), Arizona State Teachers College at Tempe (now Arizona State University), the University of New Mexico and New Mexico College of Agriculture and Mechanical Arts (now New Mexico State University), beginning the 1931–32 academic year.
- 1932 – Texas Technological College (now Texas Tech University) joined the Border in the 1932–33 academic year.
- 1935 – The College of Mines and Metallurgy of the University of Texas (now the University of Texas at El Paso) joined the Border in the 1935–36 academic year.
- 1941 – Hardin–Simmons University and West Texas State Teachers College (now West Texas A&M University) joined the Border in the 1941–42 academic year.
- 1952 – New Mexico left the Border to join the Skyline Conference (a.k.a. the Mountain States Conference) after the 1951–52 academic year.
- 1953 – Northern Arizona left the Border to join the New Mexico Conference after the 1952–53 academic year.
- 1957 – Texas Tech left the Border to join the Southwest Conference after the 1956–57 academic year.
- 1957 - Border Conference considers expanding into California with Fresno State, University of the Pacific, San Diego State University, and San Jose State University considered.
- 1959 - Border Conference considers expanding by adding Abilene Christian University and Trinity University.
- 1960 - Border Conference considers expanding again by adding Abilene Christian University, University of New Mexico, University of North Texas, Trinity University, University of Tulsa, and Wichita State University.
- 1962 – The Border ceased operations as an athletic conference after the 1962–63 academic year; as many schools left to find new conference homes, beginning the 1963–64 academic year: Arizona and Arizona State to the Western Athletic Conference (WAC); while Hardin–Simmons, New Mexico State, UTEP and West Texas A&M began to compete as Independents.

== Member schools ==
Border Conference Members
1 Arizona
2 ASU
3 Hardin-Simmons
4 New Mexico
5 New Mexico State
6 Northern Arizona
7 Texas Tech
8 UTEP
9 West Texas A&M

=== Final members ===
Institution	Location	Founded	Affiliation	Enrollment	Nickname	Joined	Left	Subsequent conference(s)	Current conference(s)
University of Arizona	Tucson, Arizona	1885	Public	43,625	Wildcats	1931	1962	Western (WAC) (1962–78); Pacific-12 (Pac-12) (1978–2024)	Big 12 (2024–present)
Arizona State University (Note: Formerly known as Arizona State Teachers College at Tempe until 1958.)	Tempe, Arizona	1885	Public	71,946	Sun Devils	1931	1962	Western (WAC) (1962–78); Pacific-12 (Pac-12) (1978–2024)	Big 12 (2024–present)
Hardin-Simmons University	Abilene, Texas	1891	Baptist	2,333	Cowboys & Cowgirls	1941	1962	various (Note: Hardin-Simmons joined the following subsequent conferences: University Division Independent in 1962–63; College Division Independent from 1963–64 to 1972–73; NCAA D-III Independent from 1973–74 to 1989–90; and the Texas Intercollegiate Athletic Association (TIAA) from 1990–91 to 1995–96.)	American Southwest (Note: Currently an NCAA Division III athletic conference.) (1996–present)
New Mexico State University (Note: Formerly known as the New Mexico College of Agriculture and Mechanical Arts (New Mexico A&M) until 1960.)	Las Cruces, New Mexico	1888	Public	21,694	Aggies	1931	1962	various (Note: New Mexico State joined the following subsequent conferences: as an NCAA University Division Independent from 1962–63 to 1969–70; the Missouri Valley Conference (MVC) from 1970–71 to 1982–83; the Big West Conference from 1983–84 to 1999–2000; the Sun Belt Conference from 2000–01 to 2004–05; and the Western Athletic Conference (WAC) from 2005–06 to 2022–23.)	Conference USA (C-USA) (2023–present)
University of Texas at El Paso (Note: Formerly known as the College of Mines and Metallurgy of the University of Texas (Texas Mines), later Texas Western College until 1967.)	El Paso, Texas	1914	Public	25,151	Miners	1935 (Note: The UTEP men's basketball team joined the Border a few years after it became a full member for other sports (1938–39).)	1962	various (Note: UTEP joined the following subsequent conferences: as an University Division Independent from 1962–63 to 1966–67); the Western Athletic Conference (WAC) from 1967–68 to 2004–05; and Conference USA (C-USA) from 2005–06 to 2025–26.)	Mountain West (2026–present)
West Texas A&M University (Note: Formerly known as West Texas State Teachers College until 1990.)	Canyon, Texas	1910	Public	10,169	Buffaloes	1941	1962	various (Note: West Texas A&M joined the following subsequent conferences: as an NCAA University Division Independent from 1962–63 to 1971–72; the Missouri Valley Conference from 1972–73 to 1985–86; and as an NCAA D-II Independent from 1991–92 to 1992–93.)	Lone Star (LSC) (Note: Currently an NCAA Division II athletic conference.) (1986–91; 1993–present)

=== Previous members ===
Institution	Location	Founded	Type	Enrollment	Nickname	Joined	Left	Subsequent conference(s)	Current conference
Northern Arizona University (Note: Formerly known as Arizona State Teachers College at Flagstaff until 1966.)	Flagstaff, Arizona	1899	Public	22,791	Lumberjacks	1931 (Note: The Northern Arizona men's basketball team joined the Border a year after it became a full member for other sports (1932–33).)	1953	New Mexico/Frontier (1953–62); NAIA Independent (1962–70)	Big Sky (1970–present)
University of New Mexico	Albuquerque, New Mexico	1889	Public	25,441	Lobos	1931	1951	Skyline (1951–62); Western (WAC) (1962–99)	Mountain West (MWC) (1999–present)
Texas Tech University (Note: Formerly known as Texas Technological College until 1969.)	Lubbock, Texas	1923	Public	40,666	Red Raiders	1932	1957 (Note: The Texas Tech men's basketball team competed on an Independent schedule on its final season in the Border for its transition to the Southwest Conference as a full member.)	Southwest (SWC) (1957–96)	Big 12 (1996–present)

=== Membership timeline ===
Full members
Full members (non-football)
Independent
Other Conference
Other Conference
Big 12 Conference

=== Current conference affiliations of former members ===
The nine former football-playing members of the Border Intercollegiate Athletic Association are currently affiliated with the following nine conferences:

School	Current Conference	Division
Arizona	Big 12 Conference	FBS Division I
Arizona State	Big 12 Conference	FBS Division I
Hardin-Simmons	American Southwest Conference	Division III
New Mexico	Mountain West Conference	FBS Division I
New Mexico State	Conference USA	FBS Division I
Northern Arizona	Big Sky Conference	FCS Division I
Texas Tech	Big 12 Conference	FBS Division I
UTEP	Mountain West Conference	FBS Division I
West Texas A&M	Lone Star Conference	Division II

== Football champions ==
Texas Tech holds the most conference championships at seven. Arizona State won six conference championships followed by Arizona (three), Hardin–Simmons (two) and both West Texas State and the Texas State School of Mines hold one each. From 1932 to 1934 and 1943 to 1945 no champion was named. There were only two seasons where the title was split and two co-champions were named; 1938, New Mexico and New Mexico A&M and in 1942 Hardin–Simmons and Texas Tech. The winner of the conference title generally received an invitation to serve as the host team for the Sun Bowl in El Paso, Texas.

== See also ==
- List of defunct college football conferences
