= Vance Gibson =

American football coach (born 1953)

Biographical details
- Born: July 20, 1953 (age 73)

Coaching career (HC unless noted)
- 1985-1988: Sam Houston State (assistant)
- 1992: Iowa Wesleyan (assistant)
- 1992–2004: Howard Payne
- 2005–2018: Frisco HS (TX)
- 2019–2021: East Texas Baptist (OL)

Head coaching record
- Overall: 89–42 (college)
- Tournaments: 0–2 (NAIA D-II playoffs)

Accomplishments and honors

Championships
- 3 TIAA (1992, 1994–1995)

Vance Gibson (born July 20, 1953) is an American football coach. Gibson was the 18th head football coach at Howard Payne University in Brownwood, Texas, serving for 13 seasons, from 1992 to 2004, and compiling a record of Gibson 89–42. From 2005 to 2018, he was the head football coach at Frisco High School in Frisco, Texas. From 2019 to 2021, He was the offensive line coach at East Texas Baptist University in Marshall, Texas.

Gibson graduated from Sherman High School in Sherman, Texas in 1971. He earned a Bachelor of Arts degree from Austin College in Sherman in 1975 and a Master of Arts from the school the following year.

== Head coaching record ==
=== College ===
Year	Team	Overall	Conference	Standing	Bowl/playoffs
Howard Payne Yellow Jackets (Texas Intercollegiate Athletic Association) (1992–1995)
1992	Howard Payne	8–3	5–0	1st	L NAIA Division II First Round
1993	Howard Payne	3–7	2–3	T–3rd	
1994	Howard Payne	7–3	4–1	T–1st	
1995	Howard Payne	7–3	7–1	T–1st	L NAIA Division II First Round
Howard Payne Yellow Jackets (American Southwest Conference) (1996–2004)
1996	Howard Payne	8–2	2–2	3rd	
1997	Howard Payne	7–3	3–2	2nd	
1998	Howard Payne	8–2	5–2	3rd	
1999	Howard Payne	5–5	4–3	3rd	
2000	Howard Payne	6–4	6–3	T–3rd	
2001	Howard Payne	8–2	7–2	3rd	
2002	Howard Payne	9–1	8–1	2nd	
2003	Howard Payne	6–4	6–3	4th	
2004	Howard Payne	7–3	6–3	4th	
Howard Payne:		89–42	65–26		
Total:		89–42			
National championship Conference title Conference division title or championship game berth
