= Howard Payne Yellow Jackets football =

College football team

- First season: 1903; 123 years ago
- Athletic director: Adam Bright
- Head coach: Coby Gipson; 1st season, 4–6 (.400)
- Location: Brownwood, Texas
- Stadium: Gordon Wood Stadium (capacity: 7,500)
- NCAA division: Division III
- Conference: ASC
- Colors: Navy and yellow gold
- All-time record: 536–563–42 (.488)
- Bowl record: 1–0 (1.000)

Conference championships
- 19
- Rivalries: McMurry; Hardin–Simmons
- Mascot: Yellowjackets
- Website: hpusports.com

The Howard Payne Yellow Jackets football team represents Howard Payne University in college football at the NCAA Division III level. The Yellow Jackets are members of the American Southwest Conference (ASC), fielding its team in the conference since 1996. The Yellow Jackets play their home games at Gordon Wood Stadium in Brownwood, Texas.

Their head coach is Coby Gipson, who took over the position for the 2025 season.

== Conference affiliations ==
- Independent (1903–1916)
- Texas Intercollegiate Athletic Association (1917–1925)
- Texas Conference (1926–1942; 1946–1955)
- Lone Star Conference (1957–1986)
- Texas Intercollegiate Athletic Association (1987–1995)
- American Southwest Conference (1996–present)

== List of head coaches ==
=== Key ===
Key to symbols in coaches list
General		Overall		Conference		Postseason (Note: Although the first Rose Bowl Game was played in 1902, it has been continuously played since the 1916 game, and is recognized as the oldest bowl game by the NCAA. "—" indicates any season prior to 1916 when postseason games were not played.)	
No.	Order of coaches (Note: A running total of the number of head coaches, with coaches who served separate tenures being counted only once. Interim head coaches are represented with "Int" and are not counted in the running total. "—" indicates the team played but either without a coach or no coach is on record. "X" indicates an interim year without play.)	GC	Games coached	CW	Conference wins	PW	Postseason wins
DC	Division championships	OW	Overall wins	CL	Conference losses	PL	Postseason losses
CC	Conference championships	OL	Overall losses	CT	Conference ties	PT	Postseason ties
NC	National championships	OT	Overall ties (Note: Overtime rules in college football were introduced in 1996, making ties impossible in the period since.)	C%	Conference winning percentage		
†	Elected to the College Football Hall of Fame	O%	Overall winning percentage (Note: When computing the win–loss percentage, a tie counts as half a win and half a loss.)				

=== Coaches ===
List of head football coaches showing season(s) coached, overall records, conference records, postseason records, championships and selected awards
No.	Name	Season(s)	GC	OW	OL	OT	O%	CW	CL	CT	C%	PW	PL	PT	DC	CC	NC	Awards
1	Unknown	1903–1908; 1914–1916	33	9	22	2	0.303	–	–	–	–	–	–	–	–	–	–	–
2	Elmer Simpson	1909; 1911	3	1	2	0	0.333	–	–	–	–	–	–	–	–	–	–	–
3	Gwinn Henry	1912–1913	15	5	7	3	0.433	–	–	–	–	–	–	–	–	–	–	–
4	Arnold L. Kirkpatrick	1917–1923	52	32	17	3	0.644	11	4	0	0.733	–	–	–	–	–	–	–
5	T. B. Amis	1924–1927	36	22	12	2	0.639	15	4	1	0.775	–	–	–	–	1	–	–
6	Joe Bailey Cheaney	1928–1934; 1946–1947	86	58	20	8	0.721	34	9	2	0.778	–	–	–	–	6	–	–
7	J. McAdoo Keaton	1935–1942	80	53	19	8	0.713	40	4	6	0.860	–	–	–	–	6	–	–
8	Felton T. Wright	1948–1950	31	15	15	1	0.500	7	7	0	0.500	–	–	–	–	–	–	–
9	Carl Anderson	1951–1952	46	25	19	2	0.565	8	8	0	0.500	–	–	–	–	2	–	–
10	Guy B. Gardner	1953–1955	29	18	9	2	0.655	4	4	0	0.500	–	–	–	–	–	–	–
11	Bennie B. Williams	1956–1961	118	44	72	2	0.381	23	50	2	0.315	–	–	–	–	–	–	–
12	Rusty Russell	1962–1963	19	4	15	0	0.211	1	12	0	0.077	–	–	–	–	–	–	–
13	Joe James	1964–1967	41	16	24	1	0.402	7	18	0	0.280	–	–	–	–	–	–	–
14	James Cameron	1968–1971	42	21	19	2	0.524	14	16	2	0.469	1	0	0	–	1	–	–
15	Dean Slayton	1972–1978	72	28	42	2	0.403	21	34	1	0.384	–	–	–	–	–	–	–
16	Harold Mayo	1979–1981	30	6	23	1	0.217	2	19	0	0.095	–	–	–	–	–	–	–
17	Bill Hicks	1982–1985	40	8	29	3	0.238	2	21	0	0.087	–	–	–	–	–	–	–
18	Jerry Millsapps	1986–1987	20	5	15	0	0.250	0	6	0	.000	–	–	–	–	–	–	–
19	Bill Anderson	1988–1991	42	24	18	0	0.571	18	13	0	0.581	–	–	–	–	1	–	–
20	Vance Gibson	1992–2004	131	89	42	0	0.679	65	26	0	0.714	0	2	0	–	2	–	–
21	Mike Redwine	2005–2007	30	13	17	0	0.433	11	14	0	0.440	–	–	–	–	–	–	–
22	Steve Fanara	2008–2011	40	9	31	0	0.225	5	27	0	0.156	–	–	–	–	–	–	–
23	Roger Geise	2012–2015	40	8	32	0	0.200	5	18	0	0.217	–	–	–	–	–	–	–
24	Hunter Sims	2016	10	0	10	0	.000	0	6	0	.000	–	–	–	–	–	–	–
25	Braxton Harris	2017–2019	30	7	23	0	0.233	6	21	0	0.222	–	–	–	–	–	–	–
26	Jason Bachtel	2020–2022	25	16	9	0	0.640	14	7	0	0.667	–	–	–	–	–	–	–
27	Kevin Bachtel	2023–2024	19	7	12	0	0.368	3	9	0	0.250	–	–	–	–	–	–	–
28	Coby Gipson	2025–present	10	4	6	0	0.400	2	4	0	0.333	–	–	–	–	–	–	–

== Year-by-year results ==
National champions	Conference champions	Bowl game berth	Playoff berth

Season	Year	Head coach	Association	Division	Conference	Record							Postseason	Final ranking
Season	Year	Head coach	Association	Division	Conference	Overall			Conference				Postseason	Final ranking
Season	Year	Head coach	Association	Division	Conference	Win	Loss	Tie	Finish	Win	Loss	Tie	Postseason	Final ranking
Howard Payne Yellow Jackets
1903	1903	Unknown	IAAUS	—	Independent	0	1	0	—	—	—	—	—	—
1904	1904	Unknown	IAAUS	—	Independent	2	2	0	—	—	—	—	—	—
1905	1905	Unknown	IAAUS	—	Independent	0	2	0	—	—	—	—	—	—
No team in 1906
1907	1907	Unknown	IAAUS	—	Independent	3	4	1	—	—	—	—	—	—
1908	1908	Unknown	IAAUS	—	Independent	0	3	0	—	—	—	—	—	—
1909	1909	Elmer Simpson	IAAUS	—	Independent	0	2	0	—	—	—	—	—	—
No team in 1910
1911	1911	Elmer Simpson	NCAA	—	Independent	1	0	0	—	—	—	—	—	—
1912	1912	Gwinn Henry	NCAA	—	Independent	2	3	1	—	—	—	—	—	—
1913	1913	Gwinn Henry	NCAA	—	Independent	3	4	2	—	—	—	—	—	—
1914	1914	Unknown	NCAA	—	Independent	2	6	1	—	—	—	—	—	—
1915	1915	Unknown	NCAA	—	Independent	2	3	0	—	—	—	—	—	—
1916	1916	Unknown	NCAA	—	Independent	2	6	0	—	—	—	—	—	—
1917	1917	Arnold L. Kirkpatrick	NCAA	—	TIAA	5	2	0	—	—	—	—	—	—
1918	1918	Arnold L. Kirkpatrick	NCAA	—	TIAA	1	0	1	—	—	—	—	—	—
1919	1919	Arnold L. Kirkpatrick	NCAA	—	TIAA	6	3	0	—	—	—	—	—	—
1920	1920	Arnold L. Kirkpatrick	NCAA	—	TIAA	5	4	0	—	—	—	—	—	—
1921	1921	Arnold L. Kirkpatrick	NCAA	—	TIAA	5	3	0	2nd	4	1	0	—	—
1922	1922	Arnold L. Kirkpatrick	NCAA	—	TIAA	6	2	1	5th	4	2	1	—	—
1923	1923	Arnold L. Kirkpatrick	NCAA	—	TIAA	4	3	2	2nd	3	1	2	—	—
1924	1924	T. B. Amis	NCAA	—	TIAA	7	2	0	1st	5	0	0	Conference champion	—
1925	1925	T. B. Amis	NCAA	—	TIAA	5	3	1	3rd	4	1	1	—	—
1926	1926	T. B. Amis	NCAA	—	TC	4	4	1	2nd	3	1	0	—	—
1927	1927	T. B. Amis	NCAA	—	TC	6	3	0	3rd	3	2	0	—	—
1928	1928	Joe Bailey Cheaney	NCAA	—	TC	10	1	0	1st	5	0	0	Conference champion	—
1929	1929	Joe Bailey Cheaney	NCAA	—	TC	8	0	2	1st	5	0	0	Conference champion	—
1930	1930	Joe Bailey Cheaney	NCAA	—	TC	7	2	2	1st	4	0	1	Conference champion	—
1931	1931	Joe Bailey Cheaney	NCAA	—	TC	6	2	0	T–1st	4	1	0	Conference co-champion	—
1932	1932	Joe Bailey Cheaney	NCAA	—	TC	7	1	0	1st	4	0	0	Conference champion	—
1933	1933	Joe Bailey Cheaney	NCAA	—	TC	5	3	1	2nd	4	2	0	—	—
1934	1934	Joe Bailey Cheaney	NCAA	—	TC	9	0	1	1st	5	0	1	Conference champion	—
1935	1935	J. McAdoo Keaton	NCAA	—	TC	5	2	3	3rd	3	1	3	—	—
1936	1936	J. McAdoo Keaton	NCAA	—	TC	7	2	1	1st	5	0	1	Conference champion	—
1937	1937	J. McAdoo Keaton	NCAA	—	TC	8	1	1	1st	7	0	0	Conference champion	—
1938	1938	J. McAdoo Keaton	NCAA	—	TC	7	3	1	T–1st	6	0	1	Conference co-champion	—
1939	1939	J. McAdoo Keaton	NCAA	—	TC	5	4	1	4th	4	2	1	—	—
1940	1940	J. McAdoo Keaton	NCAA	—	TC	6	4	0	T–1st	5	1	0	Conference co-champion	—
1941	1941	J. McAdoo Keaton	NCAA	—	TC	8	1	1	1st	6	0	0	Conference champion	—
1942	1942	J. McAdoo Keaton	NCAA	—	TC	7	2	0	1st	4	0	0	Conference champion	—
No team from 1943 to 1945
1946	1946	Joe Bailey Cheaney	NCAA	—	TC	2	5	2	T–4th	1	3	0	—	—
1947	1947	Joe Bailey Cheaney	NCAA	—	TC	4	6	0	T–4th	2	3	0	—	—
1948	1948	Felton T. Wright	NCAA	—	TC	5	5	0	T–4th	2	3	0	—	—
1949	1949	Felton T. Wright	NCAA	—	TC	6	5	0	T–2nd	3	2	0	—	—
1950	1950	Felton T. Wright	NCAA	—	TC	4	5	1	T–3rd	2	3	0	—	—
1951	1951	Carl Anderson	NCAA	—	TC	4	4	0	T–1st	3	1	0	Conference co-champion	—
1952	1952	Carl Anderson	NCAA	—	TC	3	6	0	T–3rd	1	3	0	—	—
1953	1953	Guy B. Gardner	NCAA	—	TC	3	6	0	4th	1	3	0	—	—
1954	1954	Guy B. Gardner	NCAA	—	TC	9	1	0	1st	2	0	0	Conference champion	—
1955	1955	Guy B. Gardner	NCAA	—	TC	6	2	2	2nd	1	1	0	—	—
1956	1956	Bennie B. Williams	NCAA	College Division	—	6	4	0	—	—	—	—	—	—
1957	1957	Bennie B. Williams	NCAA	College Division	LSC	3	6	0	7th	2	5	0	—	—
1958	1958	Bennie B. Williams	NCAA	College Division	LSC	2	7	0	6th	2	5	0	—	—
1959	1959	Bennie B. Williams	NCAA	College Division	LSC	3	7	0	T–5th	3	4	0	—	—
1960	1960	Bennie B. Williams	NCAA	College Division	LSC	6	4	0	T–4th	4	3	0	—	—
1961	1961	Bennie B. Williams	NCAA	College Division	LSC	4	5	0	4th	4	3	0	—	—
1962	1962	Rusty Russell	NCAA	College Division	LSC	1	8	1	8th	0	6	1	—	—
1963	1963	Rusty Russell	NCAA	College Division	LSC	3	7	0	6th	1	6	0	—	—
1964	1964	Joe James	NCAA	College Division	LSC	2	8	0	7th	0	6	0	—	—
1965	1965	Joe James	NCAA	College Division	LSC	2	8	0	7th	0	6	0	—	—
1966	1966	Joe James	NCAA	College Division	LSC	5	5	1	T–4th	3	3	1	—	—
1967	1967	Joe James	NAIA	—	LSC	7	3	0	T–3rd	4	3	0	—	—
1968	1968	James Cameron	NAIA	—	LSC	2	7	1	7th	1	5	1	—	—
1969	1969	James Cameron	NAIA	—	LSC	4	7	0	7th	2	5	0	—	—
1970	1970	James Cameron	NAIA	Division I	LSC	5	5	0	T–5th	4	5	0	—	—
1971	1971	James Cameron	NAIA	Division I	LSC	10	1	1	T–1st	7	1	1	W Cowboy Bowl	—
1972	1972	Dean Slayton	NAIA	Division I	LSC	5	4	0	T–4th	4	4	0	—	—
1973	1973	Dean Slayton	NAIA	Division I	LSC	8	3	0	2nd	8	1	0	—	3
1974	1974	Dean Slayton	NAIA	Division I	LSC	5	6	0	T–6th	4	5	0	—	—
1975	1975	Dean Slayton	NAIA	Division I	LSC	5	5	1	6th	4	5	0	—	8
1976	1976	Dean Slayton	NAIA	Division I	LSC	1	8	1	T–7th	1	5	1	—	—
1977	1977	Dean Slayton	NAIA	Division I	LSC	2	8	0	8th	0	7	0	—	—
1978	1978	Dean Slayton	NAIA	Division I	LSC	2	8	0	8th	0	7	0	—	—
1979	1979	Harold Mayo	NAIA	Division I	LSC	2	8	0	7th	1	6	0	—	—
1980	1980	Harold Mayo	NAIA	Division I	LSC	1	8	1	8th	0	7	0	—	—
1981	1981	Harold Mayo	NAIA	Division I	LSC	3	7	0	7th	1	6	0	—	—
1982	1982	Bill Hicks	NCAA	Division II	LSC	3	7	0	T–7th	1	6	0	—	—
1983	1983	Bill Hicks	NCAA	Division II	LSC	2	8	0	T–7th	1	6	0	—	—
1984	1984	Bill Hicks	NCAA	Division II	LSC	1	8	1	5th	0	4	0	—	—
1985	1985	Bill Hicks	NCAA	Division II	LSC	2	6	2	6th	0	5	0	—	—
1986	1986	Jerry Millsapps	NCAA	Division II	LSC	0	10	0	7th	0	6	0	—	—
1987	1987	Jerry Millsapps	NAIA	Division II	TIAA	5	5	0	–	–	–	–	—	—
1988	1988	Bill Anderson	NAIA	Division II	TIAA	4	7	0	T–4th	4	6	0	—	—
1989	1989	Bill Anderson	NAIA	Division II	TIAA	8	3	0	T–1st	8	2	0	Conference co-champion	23
1990	1990	Bill Anderson	NAIA	Division II	TIAA	5	5	0	T–3rd	3	3	0	—	—
1991	1991	Bill Anderson	NAIA	Division II	TIAA	7	3	0	T–2nd	3	2	0	—	—
1992	1992	Vance Gibson	NAIA	Division II	TIAA	8	3	0	1st	5	0	0	L NAIA Division II First Round	6
1993	1993	Vance Gibson	NAIA	Division II	TIAA	3	7	0	T–3rd	2	3	0		—
1994	1994	Vance Gibson	NAIA	Division II	TIAA	7	3	0	T–1st	4	1	0	Conference co-champion	23
1995	1995	Vance Gibson	NAIA	Division II	TIAA	7	3	0	T–1st	7	1	0	L NAIA Division II First Round	13
1996	1996	Vance Gibson	NCAA	Division III	ASC	8	2	0	3rd	2	2	0	—	19
1997	1997	Vance Gibson	NCAA	Division III	ASC	7	3	0	2nd	3	2	0	—	—
1998	1998	Vance Gibson	NCAA	Division III	ASC	8	2	0	3rd	5	2	0	—	—
1999	1999	Vance Gibson	NCAA	Division III	ASC	5	5	0	3rd	4	3	0	—	—
2000	2000	Vance Gibson	NCAA	Division III	ASC	6	4	0	T–3rd	6	3	0	—	—
2001	2001	Vance Gibson	NCAA	Division III	ASC	8	2	0	3rd	7	2	0	—	—
2002	2002	Vance Gibson	NCAA	Division III	ASC	9	1	0	2nd	8	1	0	—	17
2003	2003	Vance Gibson	NCAA	Division III	ASC	6	4	0	4th	6	3	0	—	—
2004	2004	Vance Gibson	NCAA	Division III	ASC	7	3	0	4th	6	3	0	—	—
2005	2005	Mike Redwine	NCAA	Division III	ASC	7	3	0	T–2nd	7	2	0	—	—
2006	2006	Mike Redwine	NCAA	Division III	ASC	5	5	0	T–5th	3	5	0	—	—
2007	2007	Mike Redwine	NCAA	Division III	ASC	1	9	0	T–8th	1	7	0	—	—
2008	2008	Steve Fanara	NCAA	Division III	ASC	2	8	0	8th	1	7	0	—	—
2009	2009	Steve Fanara	NCAA	Division III	ASC	4	6	0	T–7th	2	6	0	—	—
2010	2010	Steve Fanara	NCAA	Division III	ASC	2	8	0	T–8th	1	7	0	—	—
2011	2011	Steve Fanara	NCAA	Division III	ASC	1	9	0	T–8th	1	7	0	—	—
2012	2012	Roger Geise	NCAA	Division III	ASC	1	9	0	T–7th	1	6	0	—	—
2013	2013	Roger Geise	NCAA	Division III	ASC	4	6	0	T–4th	2	4	0	—	—
2014	2014	Roger Geise	NCAA	Division III	ASC	2	8	0	T–4th	1	4	0	—	—
2015	2015	Roger Geise	NCAA	Division III	ASC	1	9	0	T–4th	1	4	0	—	—
2016	2016	Hunter Sims	NCAA	Division III	ASC	0	10	0	7th	0	6	0	—	—
2017	2017	Braxton Harris	NCAA	Division III	ASC	1	9	0	T–9th	1	8	0	—	—
2018	2018	Braxton Harris	NCAA	Division III	ASC	1	9	0	T–9th	1	8	0	—	—
2019	2019	Braxton Harris	NCAA	Division III	ASC	5	5	0	5th	4	5	0	—	—
2020–21	2020–21	Jason Bachtel	NCAA	Division III	ASC	2	3	0	3rd West	2	2	0	—	—
2021	2021	Jason Bachtel	NCAA	Division III	ASC	7	3	0	T–3rd	6	3	0	—	—
2022	2022	Jason Bachtel	NCAA	Division III	ASC	7	3	0	3rd	6	2	0	—	—
2023	2023	Kevin Bachtel	NCAA	Division III	ASC	6	4	0	T–3rd	3	3	0	—	—
2024	2024	Kevin Bachtel	NCAA	Division III	ASC	1	8	0	4th	0	6	0	—	—
2025	2025	Coby Gipson	NCAA	Division III	ASC	4	6	0	3rd	2	4	0	—	—
