= Edward Payne =

Edward Payne may refer to:

- Edward Payne (banker), governor of the Bank of England, 1771–1773
- Edward John Payne (1844–1904), English barrister and historian
- Edward Howard Payne (1849–1908), businessman from Missouri; benefactor and namesake of Howard Payne University, Brownwood, Texas

== See also ==
- Eddie Payne (1951–2021), American college basketball coach
