= Felton T. Wright =

American football player and coach (1900–1971)

- Wright pictured in The Lasso 1949, Howard Payne yearbook

Biographical details
- Born: August 20, 1900; Junction, Texas, U.S.
- Died: May 25, 1971 (aged 70); Brownwood, Texas, U.S.

Playing career
- 1919–1922: Howard Payne
- Position: Tackle

Coaching career (HC unless noted)
- 1923: Howard Payne (line)
- 1946–1948: Howard Payne (assistant)
- 1948–1950: Howard Payne

Head coaching record
- Overall: 15–15–1

Felton T. "Pooch" Wright (August 20, 1900 – May 25, 1971) was an American college football coach. He was the sixth head football coach at Howard Payne University in Brownwood, Texas, serving for three seasons, from 1948 to 1950, and compiling a record of 15–15–1. He had a son, Robert Felton Wright.

== Head coaching record ==
Year	Team	Overall	Conference	Standing	Bowl/playoffs
Howard Payne Yellow Jackets (Texas Conference) (1948–1950)
1948	Howard Payne	5–5	2–3	T–4th	
1949	Howard Payne	6–5	3–2	T–2nd	
1950	Howard Payne	4–5–1	2–3	T–3rd	
Howard Payne:		15–15–1	7–8		
Total:		15–15–1			
