= Bennie B. Williams =

American football coach

- Williams pictured in The Lasso 1957, Howard Payne yearbook

Biographical details
- Born: January 16, 1922; Scranton, Texas, U.S.
- Died: September 9, 2007 (aged 85); Fort Worth, Texas, U.S.

Playing career

Football
- 1947: Howard Payne

Coaching career (HC unless noted)

Football
- 1948–1955: Howard Payne (assistant)
- 1956–1961: Howard Payne

Basketball
- 1951–1953: Howard Payne
- 1954–1955: Howard Payne

Administrative career (AD unless noted)
- 1956–1961: Howard Payne

Head coaching record
- Overall: 24–33 (football); 26–46 (basketball)

Bennie Burns Williams (January 16, 1922 – September 9, 2007) was an American football and basketball coach and college athletics administrator. He was the ninth head football coach at Howard Payne University in Brownwood, Texas, serving for six seasons, from 1956 to 1961, and compiling a record of 24–33.

== Head coaching record ==
=== Football ===
Year	Team	Overall	Conference	Standing	Bowl/playoffs
Howard Payne Yellow Jackets () (1956)
1956	Howard Payne	6–4			
Howard Payne Yellow Jackets (Lone Star Conference) (1957)
1957	Howard Payne	3–6	2–5	7th	
1958	Howard Payne	2–7	2–5	6th	
1959	Howard Payne	3–7	3–4	T–5th	
1960	Howard Payne	6–4	4–3	T–4th	
1961	Howard Payne	4–5	4–3	4th	
Howard Payne:		24–33			
Total:		24–33			
