= Mike Redwine =

American football coach (born 1964)

Biographical details
- Born: May 19, 1964 (age 62)

Playing career
- 1982–1985: MidAmerica Nazarene
- Position: Defensive back

Coaching career (HC unless noted)
- 1986: MidAmerica Nazarene (GA)
- 1987: Gardner Edgerton HS (KS) (assistant)
- 1988–1989: Pampa HS (TX) (OC/JV)
- 1990: MidAmerica Nazarene (GA)
- 1991–2000: MidAmerica Nazarene
- 2005–2007: Howard Payne

Head coaching record
- Overall: 66–69–2 (college)
- Bowls: 0–2
- Tournaments: 1–1 (NAIA playoffs)

Mike Redwine (born May 19, 1964) is a former college football coach. He served as the head football coach at MidAmerica Nazarene University in Olathe, Kansas, from 1991 to 2000 and Howard Payne University in Brownwood, Texas, from 2005 to 2007, compiling career college football coaching record of 66–69–2.

== Coaching career ==
Redwine began his coaching career as a graduate assistant with his alma mater, MidAmerica Nazarene, in 1986. He then served as an assistant coach for Gardner Edgerton High School in 1987 and Pampa High School from 1988 to 1989. He returned to MidAmerica Nazarene in 1990 as a graduate assistant in charge of the special teams and wide receivers.

=== MidAmerica Nazarene ===
Redwine was the head football coach at the MidAmerica Nazarene University in Olathe, Kansas, for 10 seasons, from 1991 to 2000, and compiling a record of 53–52–2. His teams made two appearances in the Victory Bowl, in 1997 and 1999, losing both games. They also played in the Wheat Bowl for 1995 and 1998, winning and losing one game each.

=== Howard Payne ===
Redwine was the 19th head football coach for the Howard Payne University in Brownwood, Texas, serving for three seasons, from 2005 to 2007. His coaching record at Howard Payne was 13–17.

== Head coaching record ==
=== College ===
Year	Team	Overall	Conference	Standing	Bowl/playoffs	NAIA^{#}
MidAmerica Nazarene Pioneers (Heart of America Athletic Conference) (1991–2000)
1991	MidAmerica Nazarene	0–10	0–6	7th		
1992	MidAmerica Nazarene	1–9	1–7	T–8th		
1993	MidAmerica Nazarene	2–8	1–7	8th		
1994	MidAmerica Nazarene	6–3–1	4–3–1	5th		
1995	MidAmerica Nazarene	8–2–1	5–2–1	3rd		
1996	MidAmerica Nazarene	5–5	4–5	T–5th		
1997	MidAmerica Nazarene	7–4	6–3	3rd	L Victory	
1998	MidAmerica Nazarene	6–5	5–4	T–4th		
1999	MidAmerica Nazarene	7–4	6–3	T–3rd	L Victory	22
2000	MidAmerica Nazarene	11–2	8–1	2nd	L NAIA Quarterfinal	5
MidAmerica Nazarene:		53–52–2	38–41–2			
Howard Payne Yellow Jackets (American Southwest Conference) (2005–2007)
2005	Howard Payne	7–3	7–2	T–2nd		
2006	Howard Payne	5–5	3–5	T–5th		
2007	Howard Payne	1–9	1–7	T–8th		
Howard Payne:		13–17	11–14			
Total:		66–69–2				
