= Brownwood Coliseum =

Multi-purpose arena in Brownwood, Texas

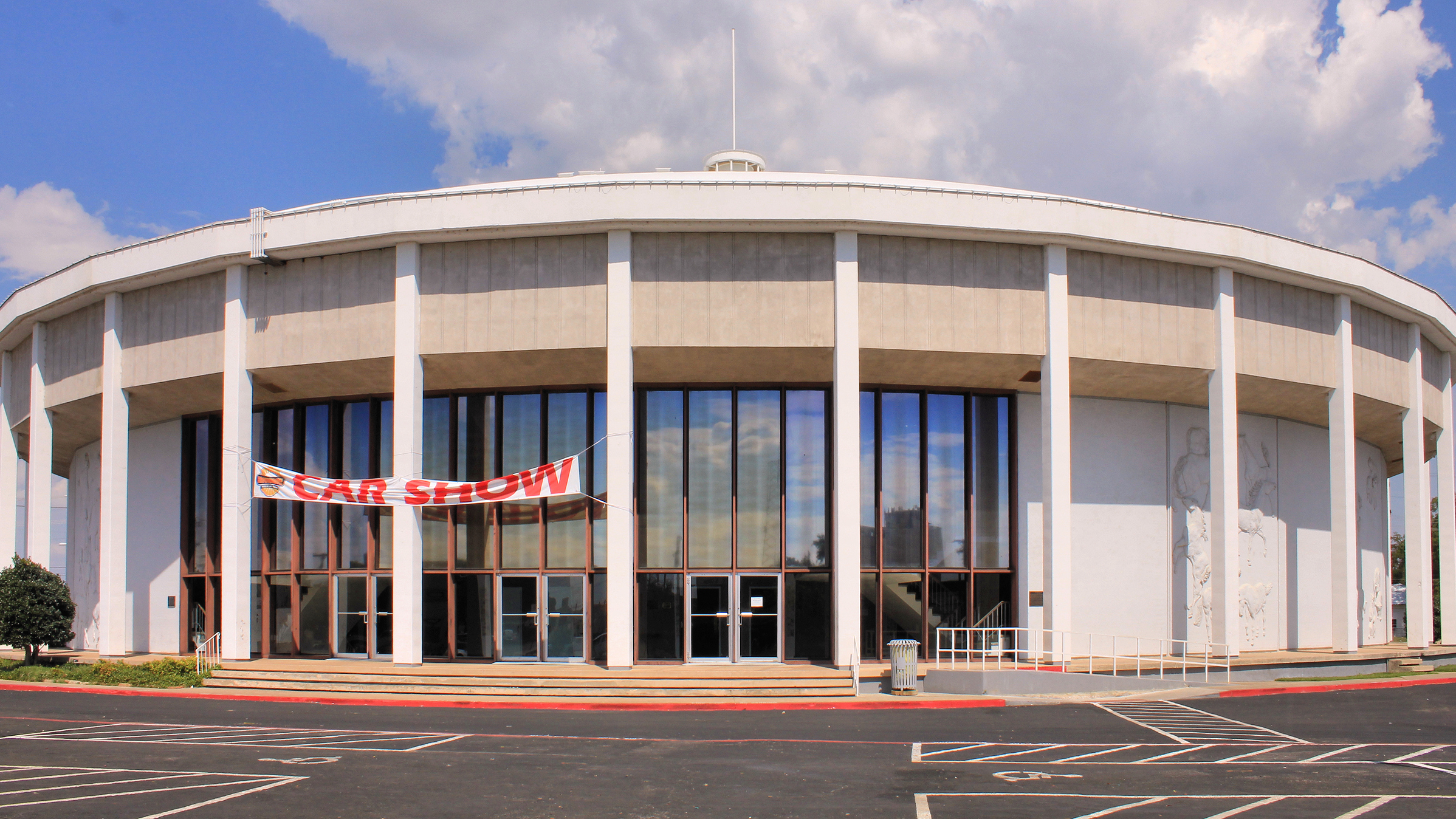
- Interactive map of Brownwood Coliseum
- Address: 500 E Baker St
- Location: Brownwood, Texas
- Coordinates: 31.720205°N 98.978148°W
- Owner: City of Brownwood
- Operator: Howard Payne University
- Capacity: 4,000
- Type: Arena

Construction
- Built: 1963

Tenant
- Howard Payne University Yellow Jackets (NCAA) (1963-present)

Website
- Official website

Brownwood Coliseum is a 4,000 seat multi-purpose arena in Brownwood, Texas, United States. Built in 1963, it is the home of the Howard Payne University Yellow Jackets basketball and volleyball teams.
