= Kevin Bachtel =

American football coach

Current position
- Title: Head coach
- Team: Edgewood HS (TX)
- Record: 40–17

Biographical details
- Born: Texas, U.S.
- Education: Texas A&M University–Commerce (2000)

Coaching career (HC unless noted)
- ?: Wills Point HS (TX) (DC)
- ?–2015: Grand Saline HS (TX) (AHC/DC)
- 2016–2020: Edgewood HS (TX)
- 2021–2022: Howard Payne (AHC/DC)
- 2023–2024: Howard Payne
- 2025–present: Edgewood HS (TX)

Head coaching record
- Overall: 7–12 (college); 40–17 (high school)

Kevin Bachtel is an American college football coach. He is the head football coach for Edgewood High School, a position he has held since 2025, and from 2016 to 2020. He was the head football coach for Howard Payne University from 2023 to 2024. He also coached for Wills Point High School and Grand Saline High School.

== Personal life ==
Bachtel's brother, Jason, was the head football coach for Howard Payne University as Kevin was his successor.

== Head coaching record ==
=== College ===
Year	Team	Overall	Conference	Standing	Bowl/playoffs
Howard Payne Yellow Jackets (American Southwest Conference) (2023–2024)
2023	Howard Payne	6–4	3–3	T–3rd	
2024	Howard Payne	1–8	0–6	4th	
Howard Payne:		7–12	3–9		
Total:		7–12			

=== High school ===
Year	Team	Overall	Conference	Standing	Bowl/playoffs
Edgewood Bulldogs () (2016–2020)
2016	Edgewood	9–3	4–1	1st	
2017	Edgewood	9–3	4–1	2nd	
2018	Edgewood	9–2	6–1	2nd	
2019	Edgewood	7–4	5–2	3rd	
2020	Edgewood	6–5	4–2	3rd	
Edgewood Bulldogs () (2025–present)
2025	Edgewood	0–0	0–0		
Edgewood:		40–17	23–7		
Total:		40–17			
National championship Conference title Conference division title or championship game berth
