= Guy Newman =

Guy Newman may refer to:

- Guy Newman (soccer) (born 1957), English-American soccer coach and former player
- Guy Newman (water polo) (born 1969), Australian former water polo player
- Guy D. Newman (1906–1988), American academic, Baptist preacher and university administrator
