= Joe James (American football) =

American football player and coach (1934–2015)

Biographical details
- Born: April 12, 1934; Spur, Texas, U.S.
- Died: October 9, 2015 (aged 81)

Playing career
- 1952–1954: Howard Payne
- Position: Tackle

Coaching career (HC unless noted)
- 1955: Hamilton HS (TX) (assistant)
- 1956–1959: La Vega HS (TX) (assistant)
- 1960–1963: La Vega HS (TX)
- 1964–1967: Howard Payne

Head coaching record
- Overall: 16–24–1 (college)

Joe Neil James (April 12, 1934 – October 9, 2015) was an American football coach. He was the 11th head football coach at Howard Payne University in Brownwood, Texas, serving for four seasons, from 1964 to 1967, and compiling a record of 16–24–1. James came to Howard Payne from La Vega High School in Bellmead, Texas, where was head football coach from 1960 to 1963. James played college football at Howard Payne and was selected 239th overall in the 20th round of the 1955 NFL draft by the Chicago Bears.

== Head coaching record ==
=== College ===
| Year | Team | Overall | Conference | Standing | Bowl/playoffs |
|---|---|---|---|---|---|
Howard Payne Yellow Jackets (Lone Star Conference) (1964–1967)
| 1964 | Howard Payne | 2–8 | 0–6 | 7th | |
| 1965 | Howard Payne | 2–8 | 0–6 | 7th | |
| 1966 | Howard Payne | 5–5–1 | 3–3–1 | T–4th | |
| 1967 | Howard Payne | 7–3 | 4–3 | T–3rd | |
| Howard Payne: | | 16–24–1 | 7–18–1 | | |
| Total: | | 16–24–1 | | | |
