= J. McAdoo Keaton =

American sports coach (1899–1968)

- Keaton pictured in The Lasso 1936, Howard Payne yearbook

Biographical details
- Born: June 11, 1899; Tennessee, U.S.
- Died: July 10, 1968 (aged 69); Dallas, Texas, U.S.

Playing career

Football
- 1920–1921: Howard Payne
- Position: Tackle

Coaching career (HC unless noted)

Football
- 1928–1934: Howard Payne (line)
- 1935–1942: Howard Payne
- 1945–?: SMU (line)

Basketball
- 1935–1943: Howard Payne

Track and field
- ?–1964: SMU

Head coaching record
- Overall: 53–19–8 (football); 95–64 (basketball)

Accomplishments and honors

Championships
- Football; 6 Texas Conference (1936–1938, 1940–1942)

James McAdoo Keaton (June 11, 1899 – July 10, 1968) was an American football, basketball, and track coach. He was the fourth head football coach at Howard Payne University in Brownwood, Texas, serving for eight seasons, from 1935 to 1942, and compiling a record of 53–19–8. Keaton also served as the head basketball coach at Howard Payne from 1935 to 1943, tallying a mark of 95–64.

Keaton was born in Tennessee and moved with his family at the age of five to Texas. He attended high school in Temple, Texas and played college football at Howard Payne. In 1945 Keaton joined the football coaching staff as line coach at Southern Methodist University (SMU). He later became track coach at SMU. Keaton died following a cerebral hemorrhage on July 10, 1968, at Baylor Hospital in Dallas, Texas.

== Head coaching record ==
=== Football ===
Year	Team	Overall	Conference	Standing	Bowl/playoffs
Howard Payne Yellow Jackets (Texas Conference) (1935–1942)
1935	Howard Payne	5–2–3	3–1–3	3rd	
1936	Howard Payne	7–2–1	5–0–1	1st	
1937	Howard Payne	8–1–1	7–0	1st	
1938	Howard Payne	7–3–1	6–0–1	T–1st	
1939	Howard Payne	5–4–1	4–2–1	4th	
1940	Howard Payne	6–4	5–1	T–1st	
1941	Howard Payne	8–1–1	6–0	1st	
1942	Howard Payne	7–2	4–0	1st	
Howard Payne:		53–19–8	40–4–6		
Total:		53–19–8			
National championship Conference title Conference division title or championship game berth
