= 1997 Victory Bowl =

MidAmerica Nazarene Pioneers	Olivet Nazarene Tigers
(7–3)	(7–3)
42	56
Head coach: Mike Redwine	Head coach: Mike Conway
	1	2	3	4	Total
MidAmerica Nazarene	7	14	7	14	42
Olivet Nazarene	17	7	11	21	56
- Date: November 29, 1997
- Season: 1997
- Stadium: Fawcett Stadium
- Location: Canton, Ohio
- MVP: Brad Odgers QB (Olivet Nazarene)
- Attendance: 850

The 1997 Victory Bowl, the first edition of the annual game, was a college football bowl game played on Saturday, November 29, 1997, at Fawcett Stadium in Canton, Ohio. It featured the Olivet Nazarene Tigers against the MidAmerica Nazarene Pioneers. The Tigers won 56–42.

== Scoring summary ==
Scoring summary

Quarter	Time	Drive			Team	Scoring information	Score	
Quarter	Time	Plays	Yards	TOP	Team	Scoring information	MidAmerica Nazarene Pioneers	Olivet Nazarene Tigers
1	12:15	5	69	2:45	MidAmerica Nazarene Pioneers	Kelvin Lee 36-yard touchdown run, Josh Kearns kick Good	7	0
1	7:51	10	72	4:24	Olivet Nazarene Tigers	24-yard field goal by Chad Martin	7	3
1	4:55	3	87	1:11	Olivet Nazarene Tigers	Billy Stamper 64-yard touchdown run, Chad Martin kick Good	7	10
1	1:21	3	80	1:28	Olivet Nazarene Tigers	Ardel Buchanon 77-yard touchdown reception from Brad Odgers, Chad Martin kick Good	7	17
2	3:21	5	37	1:24	Olivet Nazarene Tigers	Hollist Brown 3-yard touchdown run, Chad Martin kick Good	7	24
2	2:38	3	44	0:43	MidAmerica Nazarene Pioneers	Tim Offutt 26-yard touchdown reception from Gabe Lujan, Josh Kearns kick Good	14	24
2	1:26	4	53	1:12	MidAmerica Nazarene Pioneers	Jeremy Jones 37-yard touchdown reception from Gabe Lujan, Josh Kearns kick Good	21	24
3	6:15	13	54	5:10	Olivet Nazarene Tigers	32-yard field goal by Chad Martin	21	27
3	3:48	8	65	2:30	MidAmerica Nazarene Pioneers	Tim Offutt 15-yard touchdown reception from Gabe Lujan, Josh Kearns kick Good	28	27
3	1:30	-	-	-	Olivet Nazarene Tigers	Fumble recovery returned 0 yards for touchdown by Benji McLain, 2-point Brad Odgers Rush Good	28	35
4	13:29	6	62	1:42	Olivet Nazarene Tigers	Jeff Knight 34-yard touchdown reception from Brad Odgers, Chad Martin kick Good	28	42
4	9:11	4	52	2:03	Olivet Nazarene Tigers	Hollist Brown 27-yard touchdown run, Chad Martin kick Good	28	49
4	3:29	7	59	3:39	Olivet Nazarene Tigers	Ben Burke 12-yard touchdown run, Chad Martin kick Good	28	56
4	2:37	4	65	0:52	MidAmerica Nazarene Pioneers	Jeremy Jones 33-yard touchdown reception from Gabe Lujan, Josh Kearns kick Good	35	56
4	0:14	3	68	0:16	MidAmerica Nazarene Pioneers	Jeremy Jones 38-yard touchdown reception from Gabe Lujan, Josh Kearns kick Good	42	56
"TOP" = time of possession. For other American football terms, see Glossary of American football.							MidAmerica Nazarene Pioneers	Olivet Nazarene Tigers
