= Dean Slayton =

American football player and coach

Playing career
- 1954–1955: Tyler
- 1956–1957: Tulsa

Coaching career (HC unless noted)
- 1958: Tulsa (GA)
- 1959–1960: Duncan HS (OK) (assistant)
- 1961: Sherman HS (TX) (assistant)
- 1962: Jacksonville HS (TX) (assistant)
- 1963: Texas Western (assistant)
- 1964: Bridge City HS (TX) (assistant)
- 1965: Cisco HS (TX) (assistant)
- 1966–1968: McKinney HS (TX) (assistant)
- 1969–1971: Howard Payne (assistant)
- 1972–1978: Howard Payne
- 1979–1980: North Texas State (assistant)
- 1981–1997: Texas Tech (assistant)

Head coaching record
- Overall: 28–42–2

Dean Slayton is an American former football coach. He was the 13th head football coach at Howard Payne University in Brownwood, Texas, serving for seven seasons, from 1972 to 1978, compiling a record of 28–42–2. After leaving Howard Payne in 1979, Slayton became an assistant coach at North Texas State University—now known as University of North Texas—under head coach Jerry Moore. He followed Moore to Texas Tech University in 1981 and remained there as an assistant coach for 16 seasons.

== Head coaching record ==
Year	Team	Overall	Conference	Standing	Bowl/playoffs
Howard Payne Yellow Jackets (Lone Star Conference) (1972–1978)
1972	Howard Payne	5–4	4–4	T–4th	
1973	Howard Payne	8–3	8–1	2nd	
1974	Howard Payne	5–6	4–5	T–6th	
1975	Howard Payne	5–5–1	4–5	6th	
1976	Howard Payne	1–8–1	1–5–1	T–7th	
1977	Howard Payne	2–8	0–7	8th	
1978	Howard Payne	2–8	0–7	8th	
Howard Payne:		28–42–2	21–19–1		
Total:		28–34–2			
