= Edward Howard Payne =

American businessman

Edward Howard Payne (March 20, 1849 – May 6, 1900) was a businessman from Missouri. He was a major benefactor in funding an institution of higher education in Brownwood, Texas, that evolved into Howard Payne University, named after Payne.

== Early life ==
Payne was born on March 20, 1849, and raised, in St. Louis. He was educated at Westminster College in Fulton.

== Career ==
Payne became a prominent businessman and owned considerable property in St. Louis. With his wealth, he became a benefactor in funding an institution of higher education in central Texas, which later evolved into Howard Payne University – with Payne being the namesake – located in Brownwood, Texas. Payne's brother-in-law, John D. Robnett, was the president of the first Board of Trustees of the University.

== Personal life ==
In 1874, Payne was married to Margaret R. Robnett (1853–1926), the daughter of James and Sarah (née James) Robnett, and the sister of John D. Robnett, pastor of the First Baptist Church in Brownwood.

- Nelle Payne (1880–1918)
- David Mode Payne (1883–1966), an artist who married Ann Shaw (1881–1953).

Payne died from "cancer of the bowels" on May 6, 1900 and was buried at Hillcrest Cemetery in Fulton, Missouri.
