= Guy D. Newman =

Guy D. Newman

Guy D. Newman (December 6, 1906, Dorchester, Texas – July 4, 1988) was an American academic, Baptist Preacher, Vice-President of Baylor University, and President of Howard Payne University.

== Background ==
He married Julia Herbst, and after her death, Estelle McKneely. Together, they had four children: Guy Newman Jr., Charlotte Anne Harris, Patricia Garner, and Bobbie Kaye Strickland. After the death of Julia Herbst, Newman took his three children down to Waco where he attended Baylor University.

== Academics life ==
While studying he served as a pastor at Seventh and James Baptist Church on Baylor's campus. It was in his role as pastor where he met Estelle McKneely. Newman served as Pastor in Brownwood before returning to Baylor as Vice-President of Fundraising and Development. He was then selected to serve as President of Howard Payne University, a position he served in from 1955-1973.
