= McMurry War Hawks =

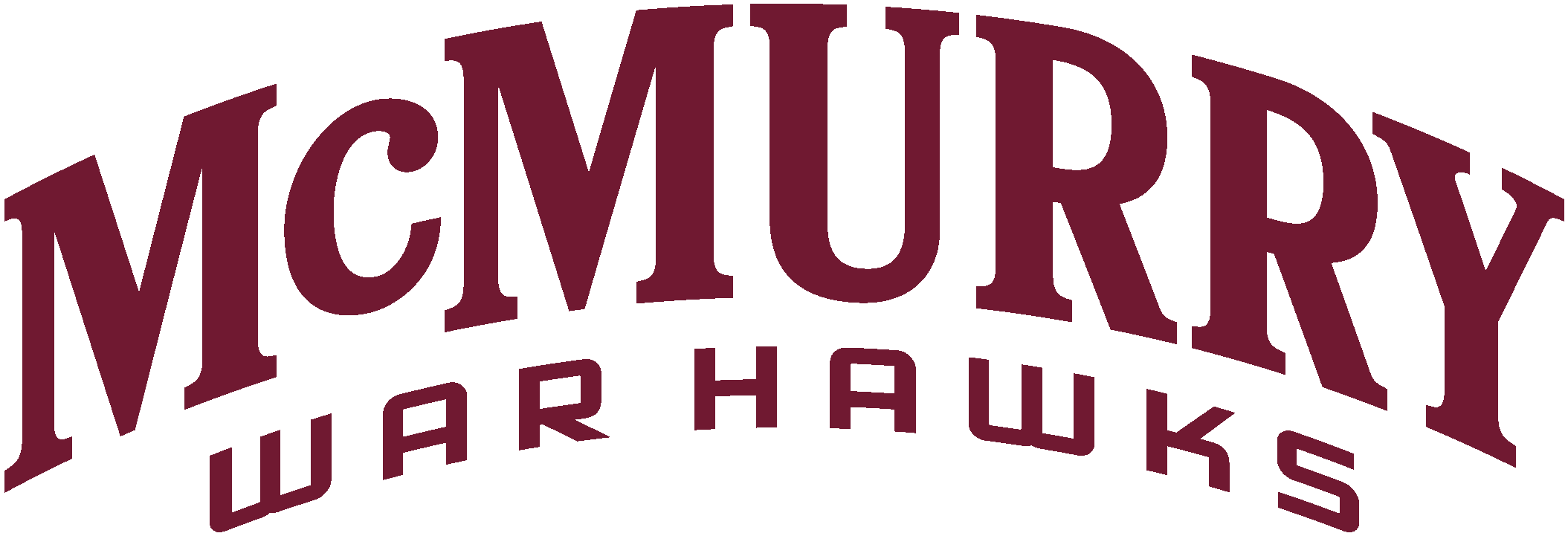
- Nickname: War Hawks
- NCAA: Division III
- Conference: Southern Collegiate Athletic Conference
- Athletic director: Susan Decker
- Location: Abilene, Texas
- Varsity teams: 24 (10 men's, 11 women's, 3 co-ed)
- Football stadium: Wilford Moore Stadium
- Basketball arena: Kimbrell Arena
- Baseball stadium: Walt Driggers Field
- Softball stadium: Edwards Field
- Aquatics center: Phillips Family Center
- Golf course: Diamondback Golf Club
- Tennis venue: Seidel-Swagerty Tennis Center
- Outdoor track and field venue: Wilford Moore Stadium
- Colors: Maroon and black

The McMurry War Hawks are the intercollegiate athletic teams representing McMurry University. McMurry fields teams in 20 different intercollegiate sports. For the men, McMurry competes in baseball, basketball, cross country, football, golf, soccer, swimming, tennis, esports, indoor and outdoor track and field and wrestling. For the women, McMurry competes in basketball, cross country, golf, soccer, swimming, tennis, esports, indoor and outdoor track and field, volleyball, in which they won the NCCAA national championship in 2012, wrestling and softball. McMurry's school colors are maroon and white.

All teams played in the NCAA Division III American Southwest Conference until 2011. In July 2011, McMurry announced that it had been accepted as a candidate for NCAA Division II membership and joined the Heartland Conference in the fall of 2012. The Board of Regent voted in January 2014 to move back to Division III. McMurry University became a member of the American Southwest Conference (ASC) in the 2026-27 academic year.

== Football ==
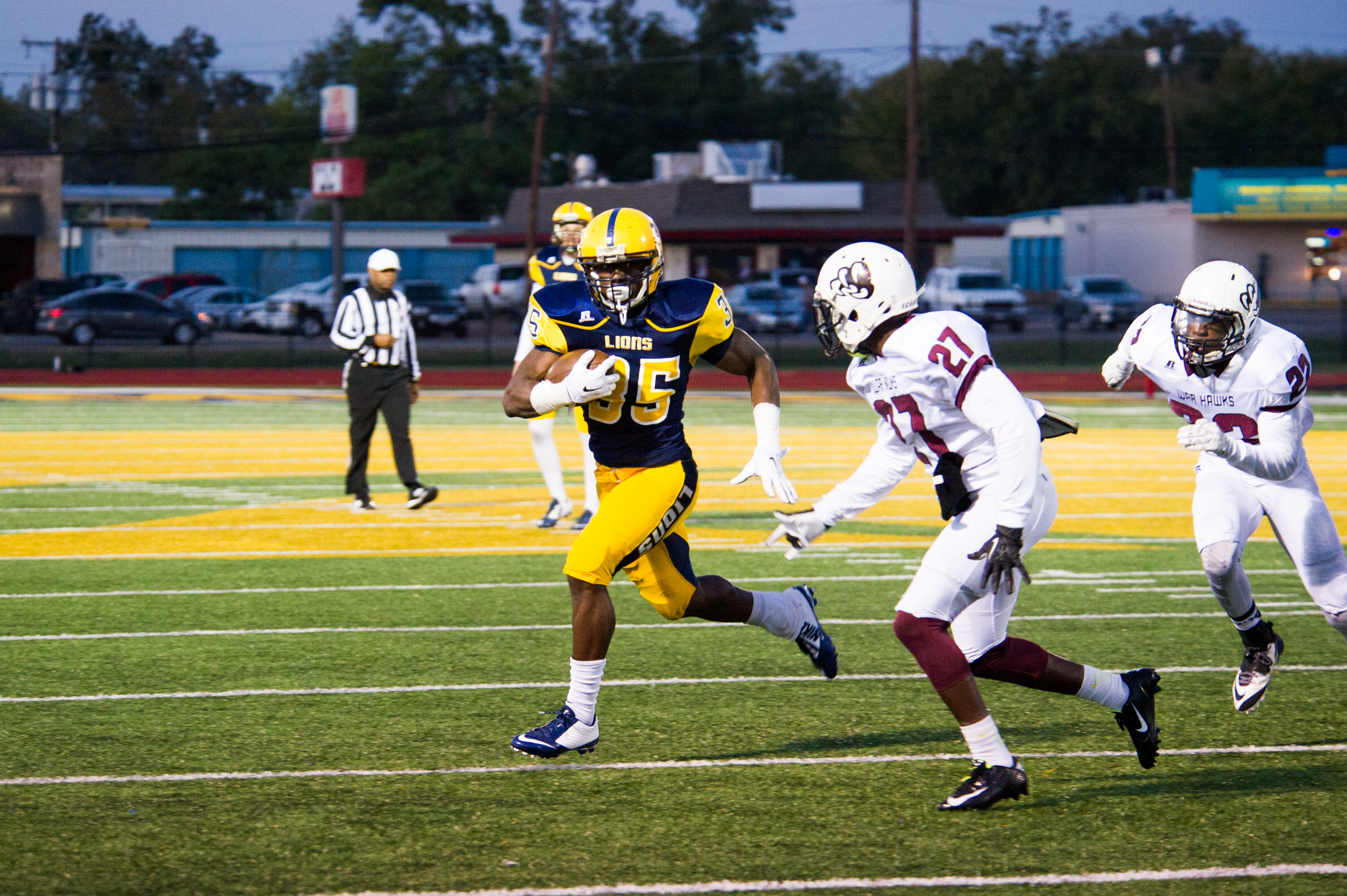
The McMurry University football team in action against the Texas A&M–Commerce Lions in 2014

The McMurry football team joined the Lone Star Conference in 2014.

== Other sports ==
McMurry University announced October 19, 2016, that the sport of softball would be added to its women's intercollegiate programs, beginning in 2018. The addition of softball would bring to 20 the number of sports sponsored by the War Hawks. Softball sponsorship in the ASC would grow to 13 teams and becomes the seventh conference championship sport to be supported at every member institution. Women's soccer, men's and women's basketball, men's and women's tennis, and baseball are ASC sports sponsored by all ASC members. By conference rule and with full member sponsorship of softball, the ASC Softball Championship Tournament format would shift to eight-team double-elimination with the 2018 tournament.

In April 2026, McMurry announced the creation of men's and women's gymnastic teams. The two teams are anticipated to begin competition in Fall 2027.

== Facilities ==
Walt Driggers Field is the home of the McMurry War Hawks collegiate baseball program. The field was designed and built by Anglea Sports Fields, which is headed by former Globe Life Park in Arlington superintendent Jim Anglea. McMurry played its first game at Walt Driggers Field on February 12, 1997, with a 7–3 win against Wayland Baptist Pioneers. The school officially renamed the field before a home game against the Lubbock Christian Chaparrals shortly thereafter.
