= Heartland Conference =

Defunct US collegiate athletic conference

- Conference: NCAA
- Founded: 1999
- Folded: 2019
- Commissioner: Tony Stigliano (final)
- Sports fielded: 13; men's: 6; women's: 7
- Division: Division II
- No. of teams: 9 (final)
- Headquarters: Waco, Texas
- Region: South Central United States
- Website: heartlandsports.org

Locations
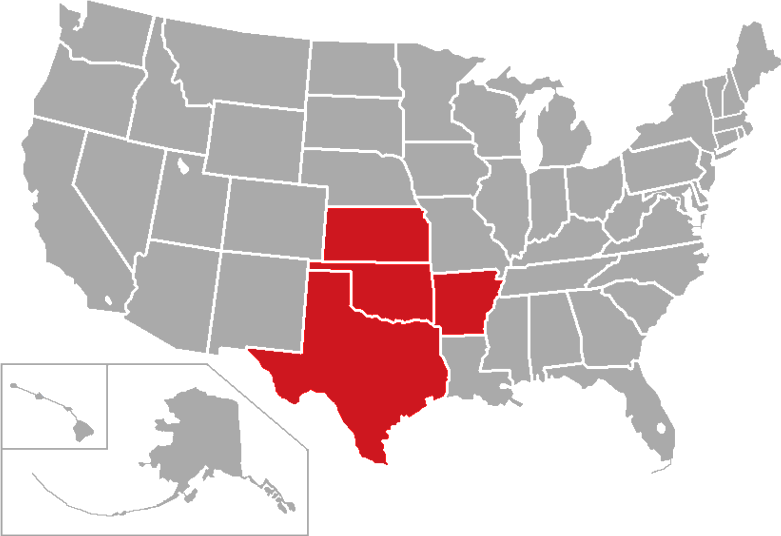

The Heartland Conference was a collegiate athletic conference affiliated with the National Collegiate Athletic Association (NCAA)'s Division II level, which was founded in 1999. The majority of members were in Texas, with additional members in Arkansas, Kansas, and Oklahoma. The conference office was located in Waco, Texas.

== History ==
The conference was formed in 1999 by founding members Drury University, University of the Incarnate Word, Lincoln University, Rockhurst University, St. Edward's University, St. Mary's University and Texas Wesleyan University. Oklahoma Panhandle State University and Dallas Baptist University joined in 2002. Founding members Drury and Rockhurst left the Heartland Conference to join the Great Lakes Valley Conference (GLVC) in 2005. Western New Mexico University and Montana State University - Billings joined in 2005. However, WNMU re-joined the Rocky Mountain Athletic Conference in 2006 and MSUB joined the Great Northwest Athletic Conference in 2007. Newman University, Texas A&M International University and the University of Texas of the Permian Basin joined the conference in 2006, making the transition from NAIA to NCAA Division II. The University of Arkansas – Fort Smith joined the conference in the Fall of 2009 after transitioning from the NJCAA. In the fall of 2010, Lincoln left for the Mid-America Intercollegiate Athletics Association and Incarnate Word left for the Lone Star Conference. In July 2011, McMurry University announced that it had been accepted as candidate for D-II membership and would join the Heartland Conference in the fall of 2012. In February 2012, Oklahoma Christian University announced its intention to seek membership in NCAA Division II. In Spring 2012, Rogers State University, a member of the NAIA Sooner Athletic Conference, applied for membership. The conference confirmed in July 2012 that Oklahoma Christian's teams would play full conference schedules starting in Fall 2012 and that Rogers State and Lubbock Christian University would begin conference play in 2013-14.

On August 30, 2017, the Lone Star Conference announced that eight of the nine members of the Heartland Conference would join in fall 2019; the remaining member, Newman, announced it would seek other affiliation at that time. On February 8, 2018, Newman announced that it would become an associate member of the Mid-America Intercollegiate Athletics Association beginning in the 2019–20 season. On October 18, 2018 Rogers State decided to join the MIAA instead of the Lone Star.

=== Chronological timeline ===
- 1999 – The Heartland Conference was founded. Charter members included Drury College (now Drury University), the University of the Incarnate Word, Lincoln University of Missouri, Rockhurst College (now Rockhurst University), St. Edward's University, St. Mary's University and Texas Wesleyan University, beginning the 1999–2000 academic year.
- 2002 – Dallas Baptist University and Oklahoma Panhandle State University joined the Heartland in the 2002–03 academic year.
- 2005:
  - Drury and Rockhurst to join the Great Lakes Valley Conference (GLVC) after the 2004–05 academic year.
  - Montana State University at Billings and Western New Mexico University joined the Heartland in the 2005–06 academic year.
- 2006:
  - Western New Mexico left the Heartland to join the Rocky Mountain Athletic Conference (RMAC) after the 2005–06 academic year.
  - Newman University, the University of Texas of the Permian Basin (Texas–Permian Basin or UTPB) and Texas A&M International University (TAMIU) joined the Heartland in the 2006–07 academic year.
- 2007 – Montana State–Billings left the Heartland to join the Great Northwest Athletic Conference (GNAC) after the 2006–07 academic year.
- 2009 – The University of Arkansas at Fort Smith (Arkansas–Fort Smith or UAFS) joined the Heartland in the 2009–10 academic year.
- 2010 – Two institutions left the Heartland to join their respective new home primary conferences, both effective after the 2009–10 academic year:
  - Incarnate Word (UIW) to the Lone Star Conference (LSC)
  - and Lincoln (Mo.) to return to the Mid-America Intercollegiate Athletics Association (MIAA)
- 2012 – McMurry University and Oklahoma Christian University joined the Heartland in the 2012–13 academic year.
- 2013 – Lubbock Christian University and Rogers State University joined the Heartland in the 2013–14 academic year.
- 2016:
  - Texas–Permian Basin (UTPB) left the Heartland to join the Lone Star after the 2015–16 academic year. However, it would remain in the Heartland as an affiliate member for men's soccer beginning the 2016 fall season (2016–17 academic year).
  - Eastern New Mexico University, Midwestern State University and West Texas A&M University joined the Heartland as affiliate members for men's soccer in the 2016 fall season (2016–17 academic year).
- 2019 – The Heartland ceased operations as an athletic conference after the 2018–19 academic year; as many schools left to join their respective new home primary conferences, beginning the 2019–20 school year:
  - Arkansas–Fort Smith (UAFS), Dallas Baptist, Lubbock Christian, Oklahoma Christian, St. Edward's (Tex.), St. Mary's (Tex.) and Texas A&M International (TAMIU) joined the Lone Star to renew their rivalries with Texas–Permian Basin (UTPB) and Western New Mexico
  - Newman (Ks.) and Rogers State joined the MIAA to renew their rivalries with Lincoln (Mo.)
  - and men's soccer affiliates Eastern New Mexico, Midwestern State, Texas–Permian Basin (UTPB) and West Texas A&M returned to their primary home conference once the Lone Star began to re-sponsor the sport

== Member schools ==
=== Final members ===
The Heartland had nine final full members, all but three were private schools:

Institution	Location	Founded	Affiliation	Enrollment	Nickname	Colors	Joined (Note: Represents the calendar year when fall sports competition begins.)	Left (Note: Represents the calendar year when spring sports competition ends.)	Subsequent conference(s)	Current primary conference
University of Arkansas–Fort Smith	Fort Smith, Arkansas	1928	Public	6,713	Lions		2009	2019	Lone Star (LSC) (2019–24)	Mid-America (MIAA) (2024–present)
Dallas Baptist University (Note: Non-basketball school on the women's side.)	Dallas, Texas	1898	Baptist	5,500	Patriots		2002 (Note: The Dallas Baptist men's basketball team joined the Heartland four years after becoming a full member for other sports (2006–07).)	2019	Lone Star (LSC) (2019–present)	
Lubbock Christian University	Lubbock, Texas	1957	Churches of Christ	2,100	Chaparrals & Lady Chaps		2013	2019	Lone Star (LSC) (2019–present)	
Newman University	Wichita, Kansas	1933	Catholic (A.S.C.)	2,700	Jets		2006	2019	Mid-America (MIAA) (2019–present)	
Oklahoma Christian University	Oklahoma City, Oklahoma	1950	Churches of Christ	2,479	Eagles & Lady Eagles		2012	2019	Lone Star (LSC) (2019–present)	
Rogers State University	Claremore, Oklahoma	1909	Public	4,227	Hillcats		2013	2019	Mid-America (MIAA) (2019–present)	
St. Edward's University	Austin, Texas	1885	Catholic (C.S.C.)	5,500	Hilltoppers		1999	2019	Lone Star (LSC) (2019–present)	
St. Mary's University	San Antonio, Texas	1852	Catholic (Marianists)	4,500	Rattlers		1999	2019	Lone Star (LSC) (2019–present)	
Texas A&M International University	Laredo, Texas	1969	Public	4,298	Dustdevils		2006	2019	Lone Star (LSC) (2019–present)	

=== Final affiliate members ===
The Heartland had four final affiliate members, all were public schools:

Institution	Location	Founded	Affiliation	Enrollment	Nickname	Joined (Note: Represents the calendar year when fall sports competition begins.)	Left (Note: Represents the calendar year when spring sports competition ends.)	Colors	Heartland sport(s)	Primary conference
Eastern New Mexico University	Portales, New Mexico	1934	Public	5,574	Greyhounds	2016	2019		men's soccer	Lone Star (LSC) (2019–present)
Midwestern State University	Wichita Falls, Texas	1922	Public	6,093	Mustangs	2016	2019		men's soccer	Lone Star (LSC) (2019–present)
University of Texas of the Permian Basin (Note: Texas–Permian Basin was a full member in the Heartland from 2006–07 to 2015–16.)	Odessa, Texas	1973	Public	3,600	Falcons	2016	2019		men's soccer	Lone Star (LSC) (2019–present)
West Texas A&M University	Canyon, Texas	1910	Public	8,389	Buffaloes	2016	2019		men's soccer	Lone Star (LSC) (2019–present)

=== Prior full members ===
The Heartland had ten former full members, half were public schools and another half were private schools:

Institution	Location	Founded	Affiliation	Enrollment	Nickname	Joined (Note: Represents the calendar year when fall sports competition begins.)	Left (Note: Represents the calendar year when spring sports competition ends.)	Subsequent conference(s)	Current conference
Drury University	Springfield, Missouri	1873	UCC & DOC	1,409	Panthers	1999	2005	Great Lakes Valley (GLVC) (2005–present)	
University of the Incarnate Word	San Antonio, Texas	1881	Catholic (C.C.V.I.)	9,366	Cardinals	1999 (Note: The Incarnate Word (UIW) men's basketball team joined the Heartland one year after becoming a full member for other sports (2000–01).)	2010	Lone Star (LSC) (2010–13)	Southland (Note: Currently an NCAA Division I athletic conference.) (2013–present)
Lincoln University	Jefferson City, Missouri	1866	Public	3,583	Blue Tigers	1999	2010	Mid-America (MIAA) (2010–2024)	Great Lakes Valley (GLVC) (2024–present)
McMurry University	Abilene, Texas	1923	United Methodist	1,430	War Hawks	2012	2014	American Southwest (ASC) (Note: Currently an NCAA Division III athletic conference.) (2014–present)	
Montana State University Billings	Billings, Montana	1927	Public	4,600	Yellowjackets	2005	2007	Great Northwest (GNAC) (2007–present)	
Oklahoma Panhandle State University	Goodwell, Oklahoma	1909	Public	1,207	Aggies	2002	2017	Sooner (SAC) (Note: Currently an NAIA athletic conference.) (2017–present)	
Rockhurst University	Kansas City, Missouri	1910	Catholic (Jesuit)	2,746	Hawks	1999	2005	Great Lakes Valley (GLVC) (2005–present)	
University of Texas of the Permian Basin (Note: Texas–Permian Basin (UTPB) remained in the Heartland as an affiliate member for men's soccer from 2016–17 to 2018–19.)	Odessa, Texas	1973	Public	3,600	Falcons	2006	2016	Lone Star (LSC) (2016–present)	
Texas Wesleyan University	Fort Worth, Texas	1890	United Methodist	2,373	Rams	1999	2001	Red River (RRAC) (2001–13)	Sooner (SAC) (2013–present)
Western New Mexico University	Silver City, New Mexico	1893	Public	3,820	Mustangs	2005	2006	Rocky Mountain (RMAC) (2006–16)	Lone Star (LSC) (2016–present)

=== Membership timeline ===
Full member (all sports) Full member (non-football) Associate member (football-only) Associate member (sport)

== Sports ==
Dallas Baptist's baseball team competed in NCAA Division I for much of its Heartland Conference tenure. At the time the league disbanded, the Patriots were single-sport members of the Missouri Valley Conference.

The Heartland Conference sponsored 13 sports, seven for women and six for men.

A divisional format was used for soccer (M).
North
- Midwestern State
- Newman
- Oklahoma Christian
- Rogers State
South
- Dallas Baptist
- St. Edward's
- St. Mary's
- Texas A&M International
West
- Eastern New Mexico
- Lubbock Christian
- Texas–Permian Basin
- West Texas A&M

Conference sports
Sport	Men's	Women's
Baseball	✓	
Basketball	✓	✓
Cross Country	✓	✓
Golf	✓	✓
Soccer	✓	✓
Softball		✓
Tennis	✓	✓
Volleyball		✓

=== Men's sponsored sports by school ===
School	Baseball	Basketball	Cross Country	Golf	Soccer	Tennis	Total HC Sports
Arkansas–Fort Smith	✓	✓	✓	✓		✓	5
Dallas Baptist		✓	✓	✓	✓	✓	5
Lubbock Christian	✓	✓	✓	✓	✓		5
Newman	✓	✓	✓	✓	✓	✓	6
Oklahoma Christian	✓	✓	✓	✓	✓		5
Rogers State	✓	✓	✓	✓	✓		5
St. Edward's	✓	✓	✓	✓	✓	✓	6
St. Mary's	✓	✓		✓	✓	✓	5
Texas A&M International	✓	✓	✓	✓	✓		5
Totals	8	9	8	9	8	5	47
Affiliate members
Eastern New Mexico					✓		1
Midwestern State					✓		1
Texas–Permian Basin					✓		1
West Texas A&M					✓		1

=== Women's sponsored sports by school ===
School	Basketball	Cross Country	Golf	Soccer	Softball	Tennis	Volleyball	Total HC Sports
Arkansas–Fort Smith	✓	✓	✓			✓	✓	5
Dallas Baptist		✓	✓	✓		✓	✓	5
Lubbock Christian	✓	✓	✓	✓	✓		✓	6
Newman	✓	✓	✓	✓	✓	✓	✓	7
Oklahoma Christian	✓	✓	✓	✓	✓			5
Rogers State	✓	✓	✓	✓	✓			5
St. Edward's	✓	✓	✓	✓	✓	✓	✓	7
St. Mary's	✓		✓	✓	✓	✓	✓	6
Texas A&M International	✓	✓	✓	✓	✓		✓	6
Totals	8	8	9	8	7	5	7	52

=== Other sponsored sports by school ===
School	Men					Women		
School	Baseball ^{‡}	Swimming & Diving	Track & Field Indoor	Track & Field Outdoor	Wrestling	Swimming & Diving	Track & Field Indoor	Track & Field Outdoor
Dallas Baptist	MVC		IND	IND			IND	IND
Newman					MIAA			
Oklahoma Christian		RMAC	IND	GAC		RMAC	IND	GAC
Rogers State				GAC				GAC

- ^{‡} — D-I sport

== National championships ==
Sport	School	Year
Men's Basketball	Arkansas-Fort Smith	1981
Baseball	St. Mary's	2001
Softball	St. Mary's	2002
Men's Golf (Individual)	Jamie Amoretti (StMU)	2006
Women's Basketball	Lubbock Christian	2016, 2019

Arkansas-Fort Smith (as Westark Junior College) won the 1981 National Junior College Athletic Association (NJACC) men's basketball national championship.

St. Mary's won NAIA national championships in Softball (1986) and Men's Basketball (1989).

St. Mary's Men's Golf team was named the Golf Coaches Association of America 2008-2009 Academic National Champions, which St. Mary's treats as a fifth team national.

Dallas Baptist won the 2003 National Christian College Athletic Association Baseball national championship.

Lubbock Christian won NAIA national championships in Baseball (1983 & 2009) and Softball (2008).
