= Texas Intercollegiate Athletic Association (1976–1996) =

Defunct NCAA Division III athletic conference

The Texas Intercollegiate Athletic Association (TIAA) was an NCAA Division III and NAIA college athletic conference that operated from 1976 to 1996. Its members were all located in the US state of Texas. When the association dissolved in 1996, most of the teams joined the newly formed American Southwest Conference which included teams from other states.

== History ==
=== Chronological timeline ===
- 1976 – The Texas Intercollegiate Athletic Association (TIAA) was founded. Charter members included Austin College, McMurry University, Sul Ross State University, Tarleton State University and Trinity University, beginning the 1976–77 academic year.
- 1979 – Lubbock Christian College (now Lubbock Christian University) joined the TIAA in the 1979–80 academic year.
- 1981 – Trinity (Tex.) left the TIAA to become an NCAA Division III Independent after the 1980–81 academic year.
- 1982 – Lubbock Christian left the TIAA to become an NAIA Independent after the 1981–82 academic year.
- 1987 – Howard Payne University joined the TIAA in the 1987–88 academic year.
- 1987 – Midwestern State University joined the TIAA as an affiliate member for football in the 1987 fall season (1987–88 academic year).
- 1989 – The University of Dallas joined the TIAA in the 1989–90 academic year.
- 1990 – Hardin–Simmons University joined the TIAA (with Midwestern State upgrading for all sports) in the 1990–91 academic year.
- 1991 – Tarleton State left the TIAA to join the Division II ranks of the National Collegiate Athletic Association (NCAA) as an NCAA Division II Independent (who would later join the Lone Star Conference (LSC), beginning the 1994–95 school year) after the 1990–91 academic year.
- 1995 – Midwestern State left the TIAA to join the NCAA Division II ranks and the LSC after the 1994–95 academic year.
- 1996 – The TIAA ceased operations as an athletic conference after the 1995–96 academic year; as many schools left to join their respective new home primary conferences, beginning the 1996–97 academic year:
  - Austin College, Dallas, Hardin–Simmons, Howard Payne, McMurry and Sul Ross State to join and form part of the then-debuting American Southwest Conference (ASC)

== Member schools ==
=== Final members ===
| Institution | Nickname | Location (Note: All cities were located in the State of Texas.) | Founded | Affiliation | Enrollment | Joined (Note: Represents the calendar year when fall sports competition begins.) | Left (Note: Represents the calendar year when spring sports competition ends.) | Subsequent conference(s) | Current conference |
|---|---|---|---|---|---|---|---|---|---|
| Austin College | Roos | Sherman | 1849 | Presbyterian (PCUSA) | 1,291 | 1976 | 1996 | American Southwest (1996–2006) | Southern (SCAC) (2006–present) |
| University of Dallas | Crusaders | Irving | 1956 | Catholic | 3,255 | 1989 | 1996 | American Southwest (1996–2001); D-III Independent (2001–11) | Southern (SCAC) (2011–present) |
| Hardin–Simmons University | Cowboys | Abilene | 1891 | Baptist (BGCT) | 2,333 | 1990 | 1996 | American Southwest (1996–present) | |
| Howard Payne University | Yellow Jackets | Brownwood | 1889 | Baptist (BGCT) | 1,400 | 1987 | 1996 | American Southwest (1996–present) | |
| McMurry University | War Hawks | Abilene | 1923 | United; Methodist | 1,430 | 1976 | 1996 | various (Note: McMurry had joined the following subsequent conferences: American Southwest Conference from 1996–97 to 2011–12, and again from 2014–15 to 2023–24; and the Heartland Conference (Note: Currently an NCAA Division II athletic conference.) from 2012–13 to 2013–14.) | Southern (SCAC) (2024–present) |
| Sul Ross State University | Lobos | Alpine | 1917 | Public (Note: Part of the Texas State University System.) | 2,070 | 1976 | 1996 | American Southwest (1996–2024) | Lone Star (LSC) (2024–present) |

=== Former members ===
| Institution | Nickname | Location (Note: All cities were located in the State of Texas.) | Founded | Affiliation | Enrollment | Joined (Note: Represents the calendar year when fall sports competition begins.) | Left (Note: Represents the calendar year when spring sports competition ends.) | Subsequent conference(s) | Current conference |
|---|---|---|---|---|---|---|---|---|---|
| Lubbock Christian College (Note: Currently known as Lubbock Christian University since 1987.) | Chaparrals | Lubbock | 1957 | Churches of Christ | 2,100 | 1979 | 1982 | various (Note: Lubbock Christian had joined the following subsequent conferences: as an NAIA Independent from 1982–83 to 1993–94; the Sooner Athletic Conference (SAC) (Note: Currently an NAIA athletic conference.) from 1994–95 to 2012–13; and the Heartland Conference (Note: Currently an NCAA Division II athletic conference.) from 2013–14 to 2018–19.) | Lone Star (LSC) (2019–present) |
| Midwestern State University | Mustangs | Wichita Falls | 1922 | Public (Note: Part of the Texas Tech University System.) | 6,093 | 1990 (Note: Midwestern State joined the TIAA as an associate member for football from the 1987 to 1989 fall seasons (1987–88 to 1989–90 school years).) | 1995 | Lone Star (LSC) (1995–present) | |
| Tarleton State University | Texans | Stephenville | 1899 | Public (Note: Part of the Texas A&M University System.) | 13,996 | 1976 | 1991 | NAIA/D-II Independent (1991–94); Lone Star (LSC) (1994–2020) | Western (WAC) (Note: Currently an NCAA Division I athletic conference.) (Note: The Western Athletic Conference will rebrand as the United Athletic Conference in July 2026.) (2020–present)) |
| Trinity University | Tigers | San Antonio | 1869 | Nonsectarian (Note: Partially affiliated with the Presbyterian Church.) | 2,487 | 1976 | 1981 | D-III Independent (1981–89) | Southern (SCAC) (1989–present) |

== Championships ==
=== Baseball ===
- 1988 Sul Ross
- 1989 Tarleton State
- 1990 Sul Ross
- 1991 Tarleton State
- 1992 Howard Payne
- 1993 Howard Payne
- 1994 Howard Payne
- 1995 Hardin–Simmons
- 1996 Sul Ross

=== Men's basketball ===
- 1977 Tarleton State
- 1978 McMurry
- 1979 McMurry
- 1980 McMurry
- 1981 McMurry
- 1982 McMurry
- 1983 Lubbock Christian
- 1984 McMurry/Tarleton State
- 1985 McMurry
- 1986 McMurry
- 1987 McMurry
- 1988 Howard Payne
- 1989 Tarleton State
- 1990 Tarleton State
- 1991 Tarleton State
- 1992 Howard Payne/Hardin–Simmons
- 1993 Hardin–Simmons
- 1994 McMurry
- 1995 Howard Payne
- 1996 Howard Payne/McMurry

=== Women's basketball ===
- 1977 Tarleton State
- 1978 Tarleton State
- 1979 Tarleton State
- 1980 Tarleton State
- 1981 Tarleton State
- 1982 Tarleton State/McMurry
- 1983 Tarleton State
- 1984 Tarleton State
- 1985 Tarleton State/Sul Ross
- 1986 Tarleton State
- 1987 Sul Ross
- 1988 Tarleton State
- 1989 Tarleton State
- 1990 Howard Payne
- 1991 Tarleton State
- 1992 Sul Ross
- 1993 Hardin–Simmons
- 1994 Hardin–Simmons/Howard Payne
- 1995 Hardin–Simmons/Howard Payne/Sul Ross
- 1996 Hardin–Simmons

=== Football ===
- 1976 Trinity
- 1977 Tarleton State
- 1978 Tarleton State
- 1979 Austin College
- 1980 McMurry
- 1981 Austin College/Sul Ross
- 1982 Sul Ross
- 1983 McMurry/Sul Ross
- 1984 Austin College
- 1985 Austin College/Sul Ross
- 1986 Tarleton State
- 1987 Tarleton State
- 1988 Austin College
- 1989 Tarleton State/Howard Payne
- 1990 Tarleton State
- 1991 Midwestern State
- 1992 Howard Payne
- 1993 Hardin–Simmons
- 1994 Hardin–Simmons/Midwestern State/Howard Payne
- 1995 Howard Payne/Hardin–Simmons

=== Men's golf ===
- 1977 McMurry
- 1978 Trinity
- 1979 McMurry
- 1980 McMurry
- 1981 McMurry
- 1982 McMurry
- 1983 McMurry
- 1984 Tarleton State
- 1985 Sul Ross
- 1986 McMurry
- 1987 McMurry
- 1988 Howard Payne
- 1989 Howard Payne
- 1990 Tarleton State
- 1991 Tarleton State
- 1992 Midwestern State
- 1993 Hardin–Simmons
- 1994 McMurry
- 1995 McMurry
- 1996 McMurry

=== Men's tennis ===
- 1980 Sul Ross
- 1981 Sul Ross
- 1982 Sul Ross
- 1983 Sul Ross
- 1984 Austin College
- 1985 Sul Ross
- 1986 Austin College
- 1987 McMurry
- 1988 Sul Ross
- 1989 Tarleton State
- 1990 Tarleton State
- 1991 Tarleton State/Howard Payne
- 1992 Tarleton State
- 1993 Hardin–Simmons
- 1994 Hardin–Simmons
- 1995 Hardin–Simmons
- 1996 Hardin–Simmons

=== Women's tennis ===
- 1980 Sul Ross
- 1981 Sul Ross
- 1982 Sul Ross
- 1983 Sul Ross
- 1984 Austin College
- 1985 Sul Ross
- 1986 Austin College
- 1987 McMurry
- 1988 Sul Ross
- 1989 Tarleton State
- 1990 Tarleton State
- 1991 Tarleton State/Howard Payne
- 1992 Sul Ross
- 1993 Hardin–Simmons
- 1994 Hardin–Simmons
- 1995 Hardin–Simmons
- 1996 Howard Payne

=== Men's track & field ===
- 1977 Tarleton State
- 1978 Tarleton State
- 1979 Tarleton State
- 1980 Tarleton State
- 1981 Tarleton State
- 1982 Tarleton State
- 1983 Tarleton State
- 1984 McMurry
- 1985 McMurry
- 1986 Tarleton State
- 1987 Tarleton State
- 1988 Tarleton State
- 1989 Tarleton State
- 1990 Tarleton State
- 1991 Tarleton State
- 1992 Howard Payne
- 1993 Howard Payne
- 1994 Howard Payne
- 1995 Howard Payne
- 1996 Howard Payne

=== Women's track & field ===
- 1977 Tarleton State
- 1978 Tarleton State
- 1979 Tarleton State
- 1980 Sul Ross
- 1981 Tarleton State
- 1982 Tarleton State
- 1983 Tarleton State
- 1984 Tarleton State
- 1985 Tarleton State
- 1986 Tarleton State
- 1987 Tarleton State
- 1988 Tarleton State
- 1989 Tarleton State
- 1990 Tarleton State
- 1991 Tarleton State
- 1992 Howard Payne
- 1993 Howard Payne
- 1994 Howard Payne
- 1995 Howard Payne
- 1996 Howard Payne

=== Volleyball ===
- 1976 Sul Ross
- 1977 Sul Ross
- 1978 Tarleton State
- 1979 Sul Ross
- 1980 Sul Ross
- 1981 Sul Ross
- 1982 Sul Ross
- 1983 Tarleton State
- 1984 Sul Ross
- 1985 Sul Ross
- 1986 Sul Ross
- 1987 Howard Payne
- 1988 Tarleton State/Howard Payne
- 1989 Howard Payne
- 1990 Howard Payne
- 1991 Sul Ross
- 1992 Howard Payne
- 1993 Midwestern State
- 1994 Howard Payne
- 1995 Howard Payne

== See also ==
- Lone Star Conference
- American Southwest Conference
