= American Southwest Conference =

College athletic conference

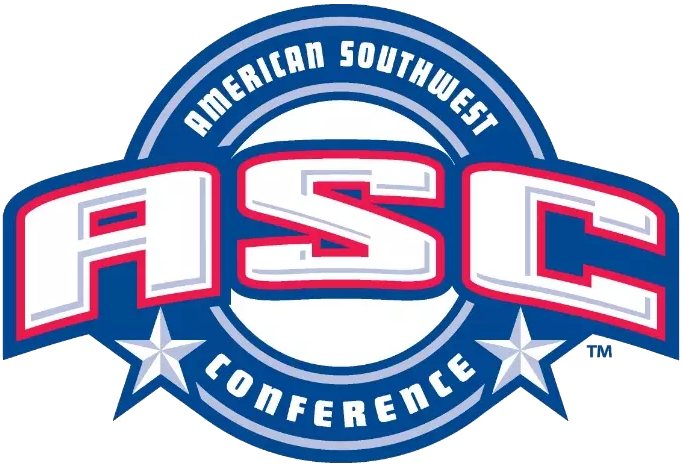
- Association: NCAA
- First season: 1996
- Commissioner: David Flores
- Sports fielded: 18; men's: 8; women's: 10
- Division: Division III
- No. of teams: 6
- Headquarters: New Braunfels, Texas
- Region: Texas
- Website: ascsports.org

Locations

The American Southwest Conference (ASC) is an intercollegiate athletic conference, founded in 1996, whose member schools compete in the NCAA's Division III. All member schools are located in the state of Texas. The conference competes in baseball, men's and women's basketball, men's and women's cross country, football, men's and women's golf, men's and women's soccer, softball, men's and women's tennis, men's and women's track and field, and women's volleyball.

The American Southwest Conference operates from New Braunfels. Texas.

== History ==
American Southwest Conference
Location of ASC members: current

The American Southwest Conference was announced in May 1996. The new league included some former members of the Texas Intercollegiate Athletic Association (TIAA). Founding members of the ASC were Howard Payne University, Austin College, Hardin–Simmons University, McMurry University, Mississippi College, Sul Ross State University, the University of Dallas and the University of the Ozarks.

The expansion soon began as the University of Mary Hardin–Baylor joined the ASC in 1997; followed by East Texas Baptist University, LeTourneau University, Schreiner University and the University of Texas at Dallas in 1998; then Concordia University Texas in 1999, and finally Louisiana Christian University, then known as Louisiana College, and Texas Lutheran University in 2000.

The University of Dallas was a member of the ASC until the end of the 2000–01 season to become an Independent; and Austin College withdrew from the ASC in the 2005–06 season to join the Southern Collegiate Athletic Conference (SCAC). The University of Texas at Tyler began athletics in 2002 and became a member in 2003, but as a provisional member of the NCAA, was ineligible to participate in ASC or NCAA postseason tournaments until 2007. Centenary College of Louisiana joined the conference in 2011, after completing their transition from Division I to Division III, but almost immediately announced its departure for the Southern Collegiate Athletic Conference.

Recently, however, several schools have announced plans to leave the conference in favor of the Southern Collegiate Athletic Conference, which lost seven of its members at the end of the 2011–12 school year. Centenary departed at the end of the 2011–12 season after joining the ASC in that same season; Schreiner and Texas Lutheran left at the end of the 2012–13 season.

In 2012, McMurry left the ASC and completed the process of reclassifying to a full-scholarship, Division II institution and joined the Heartland Conference. Additionally, Mississippi College announced that it would be also leaving the conference and reclassifying to Division II in 2014. Mississippi College will rejoin the Gulf South Conference, a league that it had been a member of until 1996.

The departures of McMurry, Texas Lutheran and Mississippi College will leave the conference with only six football playing members, below the minimum seven participating schools required to receive an automatic bid to the NCAA football playoffs. The conference has not announced a plan to maintain its automatic bid.

ASC officials announced on March 13, 2014, the forthcoming addition of McMurry University and Belhaven University to its membership. McMurry will rejoin the ASC after a two-year stint in the Division II level, competing as a member of the Heartland Conference; while Belhaven is scheduled to join the ASC as a provisional member in 2015.

On December 3, 2015, ASC officials reported that Texas Lutheran University and Southwestern University would join the conference for football in 2017 as football-only members. Both schools are members of the Southern Collegiate Athletic Conference, but the conference only had four remaining schools competing in football. Two other SCAC schools. Austin College and Trinity University (Texas), announced they would play football in the Southern Athletic Association beginning with the 2017 season. The SCAC dropped football as a conference sport after the 2016 season.

In July 2018, the NCAA approved UT Tyler's application to begin a transition to NCAA Division II effective with the 2019–20 school year. Accordingly, UT Tyler left the ASC at the end of the 2018–19 school year. While the school did not immediately announce its future affiliation, it stated that it expected to join the Lone Star Conference. The following month, UT Tyler was officially unveiled as an incoming LSC member.

In July 2020, Louisiana College announced that it would leave the NCAA and applied to rejoin the National Association of Intercollegiate Athletics after the 2020–21 school year.

More changes in the ASC membership were announced August 13, 2020, when Austin reported it would return to the conference as a football-only affiliate beginning with the 2021 season, committing to at least four years as an affiliate, then on August 19, 2021, Southwestern University announced its football program will move to the Southern Athletic Association (SAA) to start the 2023 season as an affiliate member. and on November 26, 2021, when the USA South Athletic Conference initially named Belhaven as its newest member in the 2022–23 academic year. However, on February 18, 2022, Belhaven was announced as an inaugural member of the new Collegiate Conference of the South (CCS) following a geographical split in the USA South, where the Blazers will remain as football associate members.

On November 1, 2022, McMurry University announced that it will leave the ASC in the fall of 2024 to join the Southern Collegiate Athletic Conference. While on February 1, 2023, Sul Ross State University announced that it will leave the ASC in the fall of 2024 to join the Lone Star Conference into Division II. Additionally on May 15, 2023, the SCAC announced it would also be accepting Concordia and University of the Ozarks as members for the 2024–25 school year. The rapid loss of members continued, with UT Dallas announcing their intent to transition to Division II and follow fellow conference member Sul Ross State to the Lone Star Conference on July 20, 2023 and LeTourneau announcing that they would be following McMurry, Concordia, and Ozarks to the SCAC on April 25, 2024, with both changes occurring for the 2025–26 school year. If no more schools join the ASC, the conference will be down to four schools, below the minimum required to qualify for an automatic bid to the NCAA championships for those sports with 100% participation.

David Flores was named the new commissioner of the American Southwest Conference on June 21, 2023, replacing the long-time commissioner, Amy Carlton.

Recently, on March 18, 2025, the ASC announced a ten-year agreement to expand the conference (with the return of McMurry University and Schreiner University, beginning in the 2026–27 academic year, thus bringing back to six members). It was widely reported that a financial incentive was provided to the two returning schools in exchange for the commitment.

=== Chronological timeline ===
- 1996 – In May 1996, the American Southwest Conference (ASC) was founded. Charter members included Austin College, Hardin–Simmons University, Howard Payne University, McMurry University, Mississippi College (now Mississippi Christian University), Sul Ross State University, the University of Dallas and the University of the Ozarks, beginning the 1996–97 academic year.
- 1997 – The University of Mary Hardin–Baylor joined the ASC in the 1997–98 academic year.
- 1998:
  - East Texas Baptist University, LeTourneau University, Schreiner University and the University of Texas at Dallas joined the ASC in the 1998–99 academic year.
  - Also at that time, Texas Lutheran University joined the ASC as an affiliate member for football.
- 1999 – Concordia University Texas joined the ASC in the 1999–2000 academic year.
- 2000 – Louisiana College (now Louisiana Christian University) joined the ASC, along with Texas Lutheran upgrading to full membership for all sports, in the 2000–01 academic year.
- 2001 – U. of Dallas left the ASC to become a Division III Independent after the 2000–01 academic year.
- 2003 – The University of Texas at Tyler joined the ASC in the 2003–04 academic year.
- 2006 – Austin College left the ASC to join the Southern Collegiate Athletic Conference (SCAC) after the 2005–06 academic year.
- 2011 – Centenary College of Louisiana joined the ASC in the 2011–12 academic year.
- 2012 – Two institutions left the ASC to join their respective new home primary conferences, both effective after the 2011–12 academic year:
  - Centenary (La.) to join the SCAC
  - and McMurry to join the Division II ranks of the National Collegiate Athletic Association (NCAA) and the Heartland Conference
- 2013:
  - Schreiner and Texas Lutheran left the ASC to join the SCAC after the 2012–13 academic year.
  - The University of California, Santa Cruz (UC Santa Cruz or UCSC) joined the ASC as an associate member for women's golf in the 2014 spring season (2013–14 academic year).
- 2014:
  - Mississippi College left the ASC to reclassify in the NCAA Division II ranks and the Gulf South Conference (GSC) after the 2013–14 academic year.
  - McMurry rejoined the ASC (therefore it withdrew from Division II to return to Division III) in the 2014–15 academic year.
- 2015 – Belhaven University joined the ASC in the 2015–16 academic year.
- 2017 – Southwestern University joined the ASC as an associate member for football (with Texas Lutheran rejoining back for football) in the 2017 fall season (2017–18 academic year).
- 2019 – UT Tyler left the ASC to join the NCAA Division II ranks and the Lone Star Conference (LSC) after the 2018–19 academic year.
- 2021:
  - Louisiana College left the ASC to join the National Association of Intercollegiate Athletics (NAIA) and the Red River Athletic Conference (RRAC) after the 2020–21 academic year.
  - Austin College returned to the ASC as an associate member for football in the 2021 fall season (2021–22 academic year).
- 2022 – Belhaven left the ASC to join the USA South Athletic Conference (USA South) as an affiliate member for football in the 2022–23 academic year. It was initially slated to join the USA South for all sports, but before this move took effect, the USA South amicably had split into two conferences. Instead, Belhaven became a full member of the newly formed Collegiate Conference of the South (CCS).
- 2023 – Southwestern (Tex.) left the ASC as an associate member for football to join the Southern Athletic Association (SAA) for that sport after the 2022 fall season (2022–23 academic year).
- 2024:
  - Four institutions left the ASC to join their respective new home primary conferences, all effective after the 2023–24 academic year:
    - McMurry, Concordia (Tex.) and the U. of the Ozarks to join the SCAC
    - and Sul Ross State to join the NCAA Division II ranks and the LSC.
  - Austin College and Texas Lutheran left the ASC as associate members for football to join the Southern Collegiate Athletic Conference (SCAC) for that sport after the 2023 fall season (2023–24 academic year).
- 2025 – Two institutions left the ASC to join their respective new home primary conferences, both effective beginning the 2025–26 academic year:
  - UT Dallas to join the LSC
  - and LeTourneau to join the SCAC
- 2026 – McMurry and Schreiner both rejoined the ASC, beginning the 2026–27 academic year; with McMurry rejoining the ASC for a second time.

== Member schools ==
=== Current members ===
The ASC currently has six full members, all private schools.

Institution	Location	Founded	Affiliation	Enrollment	Nickname	Colors	Mascot	Joined (Note: Represents the calendar year when fall sports competition begins.)
East Texas Baptist University	Marshall, Texas	1912	Baptist	1,813	Tigers		Toby	1998
Hardin–Simmons University	Abilene, Texas	1891	Baptist	1,665	Cowboys & Cowgirls		Hoss	1996
Howard Payne University	Brownwood, Texas	1889	Baptist	809	Yellow Jackets		Buzzsaw	1996
University of Mary Hardin–Baylor	Belton, Texas	1845	Baptist	3,321	Crusaders		CRUnk the Sader	1997
McMurry University	Abilene, Texas	1923	United Methodist	3,175	War Hawks		Wally	1996; 2014; 2026 (Note: McMurry was previously an ASC full member from 1996–97 until 2011–12, and again from 2014–15 until 2023–24.)
Schreiner University	Kerrville, Texas	1923	Presbyterian	1,326	Mountaineers		Monty	1998; 2026 (Note: Schreiner was previously an ASC full member from 1998–99 until 2012–13.)

=== Affiliate members ===
The ASC currently has one affiliate member, a public school.

Institution	Location	Founded	Affiliation	Enrollment	Nickname	Joined (Note: Represents the calendar year when fall sports competition begins.)	Current conference	ASC sport
University of California, Santa Cruz	Santa Cruz, California	1965	Public	19,938	Banana Slugs	2013	Coast to Coast (C2C)	women's golf

=== Former members ===
The ASC has thirteen former full members, all but three of which were private schools.

Institution	Location	Founded	Affiliation	Nickname	Joined (Note: Represents the calendar year when fall sports competition begins.)	Left (Note: Represents the calendar year when spring sports competition ends.)	Current conference
Austin College	Sherman, Texas	1849	Presbyterian	Kangaroos	1996	2006	Southern (SCAC)
Belhaven University	Jackson, Mississippi	1883	Presbyterian	Blazers	2015	2022	C.C. of the South (CCS)
Centenary College of Louisiana	Shreveport, Louisiana	1825	United Methodist	Gentlemen (men's); Ladies (women's)	2011	2012	Southern (SCAC)
Concordia University Texas	Austin, Texas	1926	Lutheran (LCMS)	Tornados	1999	2024	Southern (SCAC)
University of Dallas	Irving, Texas	1956	Catholic	Crusaders	1996	2001	Southern (SCAC)
LeTourneau University	Longview, Texas	1946	Interdenominational	Yellowjackets	1998	2025	Southern (SCAC)
Louisiana Christian University (Note: Formerly known as Louisiana College, until it was renamed during mid-season of the 2021–22 school year.)	Pineville, Louisiana	1906	Baptist	Wildcats & Lady Wildcats	2000	2021	Red River (RRAC) (Note: Currently an NAIA athletic conference.)
Mississippi Christian University (Note: Formerly known as Mississippi College, until it was renamed following the 2025–26 school year.)	Clinton, Mississippi	1826	Baptist	Choctaws	1996	2014	Gulf South (GSC) (Note: Currently an NCAA Division II athletic conference.)
University of the Ozarks	Clarksville, Arkansas	1834	Presbyterian	Eagles	1996	2024	Southern (SCAC)
Sul Ross State University	Alpine, Texas	1917	Public (Note: Part of the Texas State University System.)	Lobos	1996	2024	Lone Star (LSC)
Texas Lutheran University	Seguin, Texas	1891	Lutheran (ELCA)	Bulldogs	2000	2013	Southern (SCAC)
University of Texas at Dallas	Richardson, Texas	1961	Public (Note: Part of the University of Texas System.)	Comets	1998	2025	Lone Star (LSC)
University of Texas at Tyler	Tyler, Texas	1971	Public	Patriots	2002	2019	Lone Star (LSC)

=== Former affiliate members ===
Institution	Location	Founded	Affiliation	Nickname	Joined (Note: Represents the calendar year when fall sports competition begins.)	Left (Note: Represents the calendar year when spring sports competition ends.)	Current conference	ASC sport
Austin College	Sherman, Texas	1849	Presbyterian	'Roos	2021 (Note: Austin College was a full member of the ASC from 1995–96 to 2005–06 before leaving to join the Southern Collegiate Athletic Conference (SCAC).)	2024	Southern (SCAC)	football
Southwestern University	Georgetown, Texas	1840	United Methodist	Pirates	2017	2023	Southern (SAA)	football
Texas Lutheran University	Seguin, Texas	1891	Lutheran (ELCA)	Bulldogs	1998	2000	Southern (SCAC)	football
Texas Lutheran University	Seguin, Texas	1891	Lutheran (ELCA)	Bulldogs	2017 (Note: Texas Lutheran was a full member of the ASC from 2000–01 to 2012–13 before leaving to join the Southern Collegiate Athletic Conference (SCAC).)	2024	Southern (SCAC)	football

=== Membership timeline ===
Full member (all sports) Full member (non-football) Associate member (football) Associate member (sport)

== Sports ==
=== Men's sponsored sports by school ===
School	Baseball	Basketball	Cross Country	Football	Golf	Soccer	Tennis	Track & Field (Outdoor)	Total ASC Sports
ETBU	✓	✓	✓	✓	✓	✓	✓	✓	8
Hardin–Simmons	✓	✓	✓	✓	✓	✓	✓	✓	8
Howard Payne	✓	✓	✗	✓	✓	✓	✓	✗	6
McMurry	✓	✓	✓	✓	✓	✓	✓	✓	8
Schreiner	✓	✓	✓	✓	✓	✓	✓	✓	8
UMHB	✓	✓	✓	✓	✓	✓	✓	✗	7
2026–27 Totals	6	6	5	6	6	6	6	4	45

==== Men's varsity sports not sponsored by the ASC that are played by ASC schools ====
Future members in gray.

School	Bass Fishing (Note: Not organized by the NCAA.)	Clay Target Shooting	Equestrian	Gymnastics (Note: De facto Division I sport. The NCAA championship is open to members of all divisions.)	Swimming & Diving	Track & Field (Indoor)	Wrestling
ETBU	MLF	✗	✗	✗	✗	✗	✗
Hardin–Simmons	✗	✗	✗	✗	✗	IND	✗
McMurry	✗	✗	✗	✗ (Note: McMurry will begin sponsoring men's gymnastics in 2027–28.)	SCAC	IND	SLIAC
Schreiner	✗	✓	✓	✗	✗	✗	SLIAC

=== Women's sponsored sports by school ===
School	Basketball	Beach Volleyball	Cross Country	Flag Football (Note: Part of the NCAA Emerging Sports for Women program.)	Golf	Soccer	Softball	Tennis	Track & Field (Outdoor)	Volleyball	Total ASC Sports
ETBU	✓	✓	✓	✓	✓	✓	✓	✓	✓	✓	10
Hardin–Simmons	✓	✗	✓	✓	✓	✓	✓	✓	✓	✓	9
Howard Payne	✓	✓	✗	✓	✓	✓	✓	✓	✗	✓	8
McMurry	✓	✗	✓	✓	✓	✓	✓	✓	✓	✓	9
Schreiner	✓	✓	✓	✓	✓	✓	✓	✓	✓	✓	10
UMHB	✓	✓	✓	✓	✓	✓	✓	✓	✗	✓	9
2026–27 Totals	6	4	5	6	6+1	6	6	6	4	6	55+1
UC Santa Cruz					✓						1

==== Women's varsity sports not sponsored by the ASC that are played by ASC schools ====
Future members in gray.

School	Acrobatics & tumbling (Note: De facto Division I sport. The NCAA championship is open to members of all divisions.)	Clay target shooting (Note: Not organized by the NCAA.)	Equestrian	Gymnastics	Rifle	Swimming & diving	Track & field (indoor)	Wrestling (Note: De facto Division I sport through the 2026–27 season, with the NCAA championship open to members of all divisions. A separate Division III championship will be established in 2027–28.)
ETBU	Independent	✗	✗	✗	✗	✗	✗	✗
Hardin–Simmons	✗	✗	✗	✗	✗	✗	IND	✗
McMurry	✗	✗	✗	✗ (Note: McMurry will add women's gymnastics in 2027–28.)	✗	SCAC	IND	SLIAC
Schreiner	✗	Independent	Independent	✗	Independent	✗	✗	SLIAC
UMHB	Independent	✗	✗	✗	✗	✗	✗	✗
