= Howard Payne University =

Private university in Brownwood, Texas, US

Coordinates: 31.716°N 98.987°W

- Former name: Howard Payne College (1889–1974)
- Motto: Believe, Belong, Become
- Type: Private university
- Established: June 20, 1889; 137 years ago
- Religious affiliation: Baptist General Convention of Texas
- Endowment: $58.8 million (2020)
- President: Cory Hines
- Students: 1170
- Location: Brownwood, Texas, United States
- Colors: Navy blue and old gold
- Nickname: Yellow Jackets
- Website: www.hputx.edu

Howard Payne University is a private university in Brownwood, Texas, United States. It is affiliated with the Baptist General Convention of Texas. Noah T. Byers and John David Robnett founded Howard Payne College in 1889. It was named for its first major benefactor, Edward Howard Payne, who was Robnett's brother-in-law.

Athletic programs include NCAA Division III football, baseball, softball, women's volleyball, men's and women's soccer, basketball and tennis. The HPU mascot is a yellow jacket named "Buzzsaw".

The university also has extension centers in New Braunfels, Texas and in El Paso, Texas.

== Founding and history ==
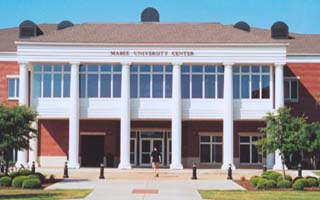
Mabee University Center

On June 20, 1889, Howard Payne College was founded at Indian Creek by members of the Pecan Valley Baptist Association. It was named for its first financial benefactor, Robnett's brother-in-law Edward Howard Payne. HPC held its first classes in 1890 and granted its first degree in 1895, to Robnett. In 1915, the yellow jacket was chosen by Carrie (Camp) Allen as the university mascot.

Thomas H. Taylor led the university through the Great Depression, which began two months into his presidency. Robert Mangrum, university historian of HPU, says it was apparent to Taylor at the 1930 Texas Baptist convention that HPU would have to close due to an inability to continue funding through the BGCT. A faculty prayer meeting was held upon his return to Brownwood, writes Mangrum, and it was decided that HPC would continue to operate with no deficits through the receipts and endowment interests.

Daniel Baker College, a Presbyterian college in Brownwood, consolidated with HPC in 1953. Taylor retired as the college's longest-serving president (26 years) after leading it through the Great Depression and helping the campus expand.

Guy D. Newman was named HPC's next president. Under his leadership, the Douglas MacArthur Academy of Freedom was established. The program is now called the Guy D. Newman Honors Academy and is still housed in the Academy of Freedom, formerly DBC's main building. Newman retired in 1972. HPC became Howard Payne University in 1974.

Don Newbury, a 1961 graduate of HPU, served as president of the university from 1985 to 1997. HPU's student enrollment increased significantly during Newbury's presidency. The university also underwent numerous upgrades and additions to campus facilities. HPU's "Buzzsaw" mascot was announced in 1996, during Newbury's presidency.

The university celebrated one of its most significant athletics successes during the 2000s, with the HPU women's basketball team capping a perfect 33-0 season by winning the 2008 NCAA Division III Women's Basketball National Championship.

Cory Hines, a 1997 graduate of HPU, was named president in 2019. Under his presidency, ground was broken for the Newbury Family Welcome Center in 2020. Construction on the project was scheduled for completion in 2022. The university also began restoring the Douglas MacArthur Academy of Freedom's wings in 2020. Other campus improvement projects were completed in 2020 and 2021, including renovations to the Veda Hodge Residence Hall lobby, the Newbury Place Student Apartments, and the lobbies of the Guy D. Newman Hall of American Ideals.

=== Presidents ===
1. A. J. Emerson 1890–1893
2. John D. Robnett 1893–1896
3. James H. Grove 1896–1908
4. John S. Humphreys (Acting President) 1908–1910
5. Robert H. Hamilton 1910–1911
6. John S. Humphreys 1911–1913
7. James M. Carroll 1913–1914
8. Anderson E. Baten (Vice President & Acting President) 1915–1917
9. Judson A. Tolman 1917–1919
10. L. J. Mims 1919–1922
11. William R. Hornburg (Vice President & Acting President) 1922–1923
12. Edgar Godbold 1923–1929
13. Thomas H. Taylor 1929–1955
14. Guy D. Newman 1955–1973
15. Roger Brooks 1973–1979
16. Charles A. Stewart (Chief Executive Officer) 1979–1980
17. Ralph A. Phelps Jr. 1980–1985
18. Don Newbury 1985–1997
19. Rick Gregory 1997–2002
20. Russell H. Dilday (interim president) 2002–2003
21. Lanny Hall 2003–2009
22. William Ellis 2009–2018
23. Paul Armes (interim president) 2018–2019
24. Cory Hines 2019–present

== Athletics ==
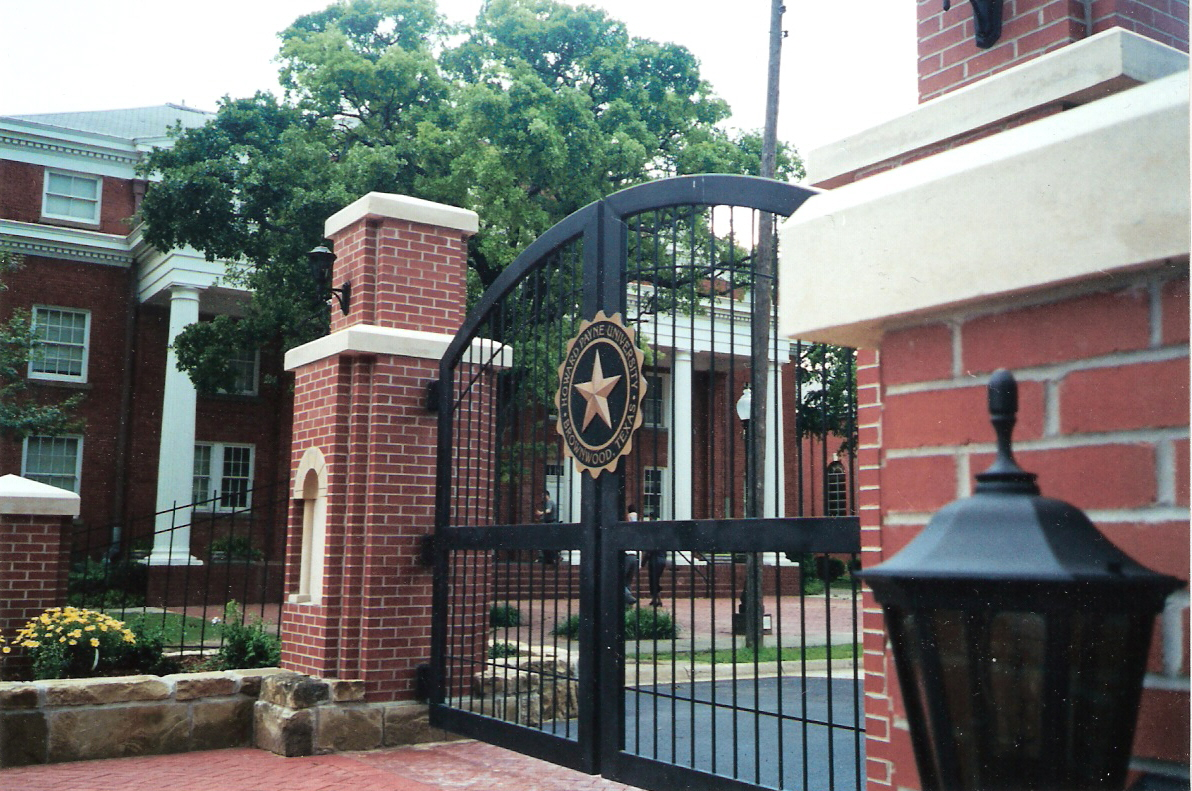
Wilson Gate, 2001

The school supports an active athletic program for both men's and women's competition in the NCAA Division III. The school is currently a member of the American Southwest Conference.

Men's sports	Women's sports
Football	Volleyball
Basketball	Basketball
Baseball	Softball
Soccer	Soccer
Tennis	Tennis
Golf	Golf

=== National championship teams ===
Howard Payne University teams achieved national championship status in 1957 and 1964 in NAIA Cross country, and in 2008 with NCAA Division III Women's Basketball.

=== Football ===
Football began at Howard Payne in 1903. Gwinn Henry was named the first head coach in 1912 and coached for two seasons.

== Campus life ==
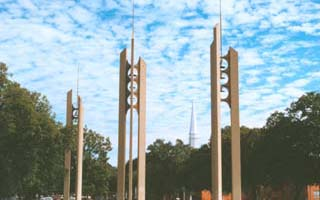
Memorial Bell Towers

In 2015, the university was granted an exception to Title IX allowing it to discriminate against LGBT students for religious reasons. In 2016, Campus Pride ranked the college among the worst schools in Texas for LGBT students.

=== Greek organizations ===
There are several fraternities and sororities on campus.

== Notable alumni ==
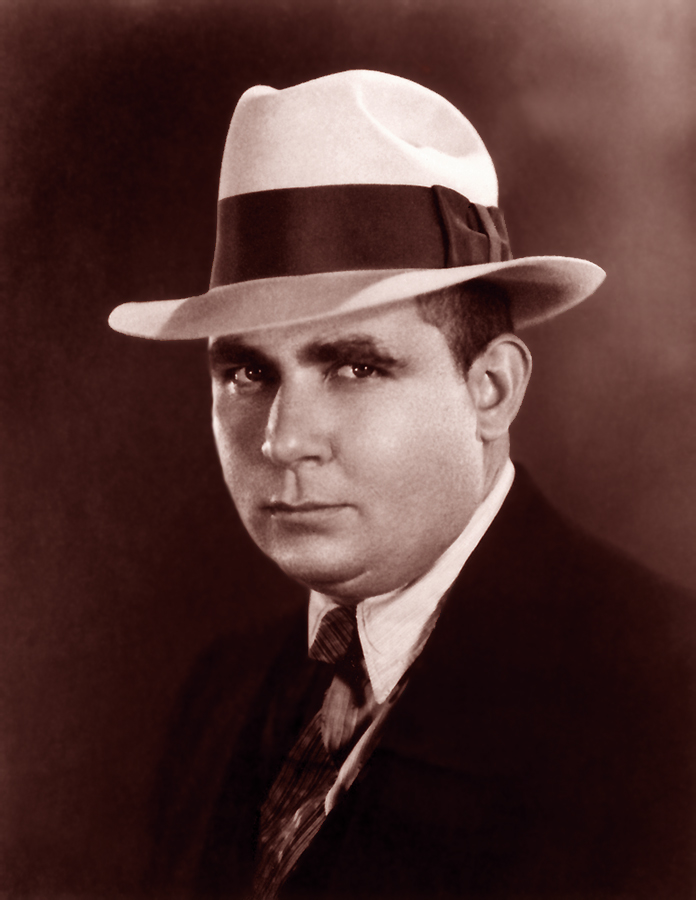
Robert E. Howard, creator of Conan the Barbarian

- Coffey Anderson, singer
- O. L. Bodenhamer, 12th national commander of The American Legion from 1929 to 1930
- Cynthia Clawson, Grammy Award-winning musician
- Keith Crawford, National Football League (NFL) player
- Ronnie Floyd, president and chief executive officer of the Southern Baptist Convention
- Ken Gray, NFL Pro Bowl player
- Slim Harriss, Major League Baseball player
- Ray Hildebrand, one half of the duo Paul & Paula
- Robert E. Howard, writer and creator of Conan the Barbarian
- Jill Jackson, one half of the duo Paul & Paula
- Ray Jacobs, four-time NFL All-Star
- Ken Sanders, NFL player
- J. D. Sheffield, Texas State representative from Coryell County
- Bob Young, NFL All-Pro player
