= 2024 Sul Ross Lobos football team =

American college football season

2024 Sul Ross Lobos football
- Conference: Lone Star Conference
- Record: 3–8 (2–7 LSC)
- Head coach: Barry Derickson (3rd season)
- Offensive coordinator: Christian Escobar (2nd season)
- Offensive scheme: Air raid
- Defensive coordinator: Cadron Davis (2nd season)
- Base defense: 3–4
- Home stadium: Jackson Field

2024 Lone Star Conference football standings
	Conf.			Overall
Team	W		L	W		L
No. 20 Angelo State $^	9	–	0	9	–	3
No. 24 Central Washington ^	7	–	2	8	–	4
Texas A&M–Kingsville	6	–	3	7	–	4
UT Permian Basin #	6	–	3	7	–	5
Western Oregon	6	–	3	6	–	5
West Texas A&M	5	–	4	5	–	6
Midwestern State	3	–	6	4	–	7
Sul Ross*	2	–	7	3	–	8
Eastern New Mexico	1	–	8	3	–	8
Western New Mexico	0	–	9	2	–	9
$ – Conference champion; ^ – NCAA Division II playoff participant; # – Heritage Bowl participant * – Sul Ross ineligible for postseason play due to transition from NCAA Division III; Rankings from AFCA poll

The 2024 Sul Ross Lobos football team represented Sul Ross State University during the 2024 NCAA Division II football season as a member of the Lone Star Conference (LSC). The Lobos were led by third-year head coach Barry Derickson and played their home games at Jackson Field in Alpine, Texas.

The 2024 season marked the second year of a three-year transition period from Division III to Division II for the program. The Lobos were not eligible for the NCAA Division II playoffs but were eligible for the Heritage Bowl, conference awards, and the regular season conference title.

On December 2, Barry Derickson announced that he was stepping down as the Lobos' head coach. On February 12, 2025, Lubbock-Cooper High School offensive line coach and assistant offensive coordinator Lee Hays was named the Lobos' new head coach.

== Schedule ==
Date	Time	Opponent	Site	TV	Result	Attendance
August 29	6:00 p.m.	West Texas A&M	Jackson Field; Alpine, TX	FloSports	L 21–42	143
September 7	7:00 p.m.	at Eastern New Mexico*	Greyhound Stadium; Portales, NM	FloSports	L 17–36	4,227
September 14	1:00 p.m.	Wayland Baptist*	Jackson Field; Alpine, TX	FloSports	W 52–51 ^{OT}	217
September 21	1:00 p.m.	Western Oregon	Jackson Field; Alpine, TX	FloSports	L 17–39	120
September 28	7:00 p.m.	at Texas A&M–Kingsville	Javelina Stadium; Kingsville, TX	FloSports	L 21–56	10,500
October 12	7:00 p.m.	at Midwestern State	Memorial Stadium; Wichita Falls, TX	FloSports	L 21–40	5,127
October 19	7:00 p.m.	Western New Mexico^{†}	Jackson Field; Alpine, TX (Battle for the Golden Tumbleweed)	FloSports	W 34–20	208
October 26	6:00 p.m.	at Angelo State	LeGrand Sports Complex; San Angelo, TX	FloSports	L 10–57	5,349
November 2	1:00 p.m.	Eastern New Mexico	Jackson Field; Alpine, TX	FloSports	W 33–28	187
November 9	8:00 p.m.	at Central Washington	Tomlinson Stadium; Ellensburg, WA	FloSports	L 0–66	4,457
November 16	12:00 p.m.	UT Permian Basin	Jackson Field; Alpine, TX	FloSports	L 7–75	200
*Non-conference game; ^{†}Homecoming; All times are in Central time

== Preseason ==
=== LSC media poll ===
The LSC media poll was released on July 25, 2024. The Lobos were predicted to finish last in the conference.

== Game summaries ==
=== West Texas A&M ===
West Texas A&M Buffaloes at Sul Ross Lobos – Game summary

Quarter	1	2	3	4	Total
Buffaloes	0	21	7	14	42
Lobos	0	7	14	0	21

at Jackson Field, Alpine, Texas

- Date: August 29
- Game time: 6:00 p.m. CDT
- Game weather: Rain, 77 °F (25 °C)
- Game attendance: 143
- Referee: Rolando Gonzalez
- TV: FloSports
- Box score, Recap

Game information
First quarter
- No scoring plays

Second quarter

- WT – Shea Whiting 3-yard pass from Sean Johnson Jr. (Preston Gregg kick), 8:11. Buffaloes 7–0. Drive: 13 plays, 76 yards, 6:43.
- WT – Sean Johnson Jr. 5-yard run (Preston Gregg kick), 4:23. Buffaloes 14–0. Drive: 8 plays, 36 yards, 3:41.
- WT – Tre'Jon Henderson 3-yard run (Preston Gregg kick), 0:57. Buffaloes 21–0. Drive: 7 plays, 63 yards, 1:46.
- SRS – Yamil Oaxaca 50-yard pass from Andrew Martinez (Carlos Arreola kick), 0:15. Buffaloes 21–7. Drive: 4 plays, 75 yards, 0:42.

Third quarter

- SRS – Kameron Dickerson 82-yard fumble return (Carlos Arreola kick), 11:26. Buffaloes 21–14.
- WT – Sean Johnson Jr. 9-yard run (Preston Gregg kick), 7:48. Buffaloes 28–14. Drive: 7 plays, 75 yards, 3:38.
- SRS – Vicente Luevano 1-yard pass from Andrew Martinez (Carlos Arreola kick), 2:52. Buffaloes 28–21. Drive: 12 plays, 60 yards, 4:49.

Fourth quarter

- WT – Sean Johnson Jr. 50-yard run (Preston Gregg kick), 13:19. Buffaloes 35–21. Drive: 3 plays, 64 yards, 1:31.
- WT – Sean Johnson Jr. 5-yard run (Preston Gregg kick), 9:14. Buffaloes 42–21. Drive: 5 plays, 45 yards, 2:42.

Statistics	WT	SRS
First downs	28	9
Total yards	522	175
Rushing yards	383	59
Passing yards	139	116
Turnovers	2	2
Time of possession	40:12	19:48

Team	Category	Player	Statistics
West Texas A&M	Passing	Sean Johnson Jr.	20/26, 139 yards, TD, INT
West Texas A&M	Rushing	Sean Johnson Jr.	14 rushes, 167 yards, 4 TD
West Texas A&M	Receiving	Zorian Stanton	5 receptions, 51 yards
Sul Ross	Passing	Andrew Martinez	10/18, 116 yards, 2 TD, INT
Sul Ross	Rushing	Jordan Morales	7 rushes, 24 yards
Sul Ross	Receiving	Yamil Oaxaca	3 receptions, 75 yards, TD

=== At Eastern New Mexico ===
Sul Ross Lobos at Eastern New Mexico Greyhounds – Game summary

Quarter	1	2	3	4	Total
Lobos	3	0	7	7	17
Greyhounds	8	14	0	14	36

at Greyhound Stadium, Portales, New Mexico

- Date: September 7
- Game time: 7:00 p.m. CDT/6:00 p.m. MDT
- Game weather: Sunny, 81 °F (27 °C)
- Game attendance: 4,227
- Referee: Jon Sasse
- TV: FloSports
- Box score, Recap

Game information
First quarter
- SRS – Carlos Arreola 21-yard field goal, 9:55. Lobos 3–0. Drive: 11 plays, 71 yards, 5:05.
- ENM – Ron Craten 1-yard run (Mario Sanchez pass to Estevan Lowery), 4:09. Greyhounds 8–3. Drive: 13 plays, 65 yards, 5:46.

Second quarter

- ENM – Mario Sanchez 6-yard run (Cooper Hamilton kick), 14:44. Greyhounds 15–3. Drive: 7 plays, 40 yards, 3:41.
- ENM – Ja'Calvin Newsom 23-yard run (Cooper Hamilton kick), 6:04. Greyhounds 22–3. Drive: 11 plays, 76 yards, 5:01.

Third quarter

- SRS – Vicente Luevano 10-yard pass from Andrew Martinez (Carlos Arreola kick), 4:40. Greyhounds 22–10. Drive: 12 plays, 85 yards, 5:45.

Fourth quarter

- SRS – Vicente Luevano 5-yard pass from Andrew Martinez (Carlos Arreola kick), 14:39. Greyhounds 22–17. Drive: 7 plays, 55 yards, 2:35.
- ENM – Ron Craten 7-yard run (Cooper Hamilton kick), 7:43. Greyhounds 29–17. Drive: 13 plays, 90 yards, 6:52.
- ENM – Jarius Stewart 1-yard (Cooper Hamilton kick), 0:31. Greyhounds 36–17. Drive: 12 plays, 50 yards, 5:36.

Statistics	SRS	ENM
First downs	18	25
Total yards	321	412
Rushing yards	72	366
Passing yards	249	46
Turnovers	1	1
Time of possession	25:03	34:57

Team	Category	Player	Statistics
Sul Ross	Passing	Andrew Martinez	19/31, 221 yards, 2 TD, INT
Sul Ross	Rushing	Andrew Martinez	13 rushes, 51 yards
Sul Ross	Receiving	Vicente Luevano	5 receptions, 71 yards, 2 TD
Eastern New Mexico	Passing	Mario Sanchez	5/6, 46 yards
Eastern New Mexico	Rushing	Ron Craten	26 rushes, 141 yards, 2 TD
Eastern New Mexico	Receiving	Elijah Zeh	1 reception, 19 yards

=== Wayland Baptist ===
Wayland Baptist Pioneers at Sul Ross Lobos – Game summary

Quarter	1	2	3	4	OT	Total
Pioneers	7	14	9	15	6	51
Lobos	17	14	14	0	7	52

at Jackson Field, Alpine, Texas

- Date: September 14
- Game time: 1:00 p.m. CDT
- Game weather: Cloudy, 84 °F (29 °C)
- Game attendance: 217
- Referee: James Minor
- TV: FloSports
- Box score, Recap

Game information
First quarter
- SRS – Vicente Luevano 33-yard pass from Andrew Martinez (Carlos Arreola kick), 11:35. Lobos 7–0. Drive: 7 plays, 83 yards, 3:20.
- SRS – Vicente Luevano 80-yard punt return (Carlos Arreola kick), 10:19. Lobos 14–0.
- SRS – Carlos Arreola 36-yard field goal, 3:55. Lobos 17–0. Drive: 8 plays, 59 yards, 4:27.
- WBU – Dequan Green 18-yard pass from Davian Guajardo (Leo Marini kick), 0:02. Lobos 17–7. Drive: 8 plays, 65 yards, 3:43.

Second quarter

- SRS – Yamil Oaxaca 21-yard pass from Andrew Martinez (Carlos Arreola kick), 12:00. Lobos 24–7. Drive: 7 plays, 92 yards, 3:00.
- SRS – C. J. Parks 19-yard pass from Andrew Martinez (Carols Arreola kick), 8:58. Lobos 31–7. Drive: 2 plays, 57 yards, 0:36.
- WBU – Marques Hall 29-yard pass from Davian Guajardo (Leo Marini kick), 4:19. Lobos 31–14. Drive: 9 plays, 83 yards, 4:32.
- WBU – Damon Ford 2-yard run (Leo Marini kick), 1:27. Lobos 31–21. Drive: 2 plays, 44 yards, 0:17.

Third quarter

- SRS – Brendon Martin 32-yard interception return (Carlos Arreola kick), 10:28. Lobos 38–21.
- WBU – Keamodre Horace 33-yard run (run failed), 8:06. Lobos 38–27. Drive: 5 plays, 75 yards, 2:22.
- SRS – Kendrick Jefferson 1-yard run (Carlos Arreola kick), 5:37. Lobos 45–27. Drive: 6 plays, 67 yards, 2:00.
- WBU – Leo Marini 55-yard field goal, 1:17. Lobos 45–30. Drive: 4 plays, 4 yards, 1:03.

Fourth quarter

- WBU – Maddox Plazek 3-yard pass from Davian Guajardo (Davian Guajardo pass to Jasiah Barron), 10:49. Lobos 45–38. Drive: 10 plays, 63 yards, 4:19.
- WBU – Davian Guajardo 1-yard run (Leo Marini kick), 2:04. Tied 45–45. Drive: 10 plays, 65 yards, 5:46.

Overtime

- WBU – Keamodre Horace 1-yard run (kick blocked). Pioneers 51–45. Drive: 4 plays, 25 yards.
- SRS – Yamil Oaxaca 20-yard pass from Andrew Martinez (Carlos Arreola kick). Lobos 52–51. Drive: 4 plays, 25 yards.

Statistics	WBU	SRS
First downs	25	20
Total yards	439	475
Rushing yards	219	132
Passing yards	220	343
Turnovers	1	3
Time of possession	32:59	25:27

Team	Category	Player	Statistics
Wayland Baptist	Passing	Davian Guajardo	17/31, 220 yards, 3 TD, INT
Wayland Baptist	Rushing	Keamodre Horace	14 rushes, 105 yards, 2 TD
Wayland Baptist	Receiving	Jasiah Barron	7 receptions, 120 yards
Sul Ross	Passing	Andrew Martinez	18/31, 343 yards, 4 TD, INT
Sul Ross	Rushing	Andrew Martinez	10 rushes, 48 yards
Sul Ross	Receiving	Vicente Luevano	6 receptions, 95 yards, TD

=== Western Oregon ===
Western Oregon Wolves at Sul Ross Lobos – Game summary

Quarter	1	2	3	4	Total
Wolves	11	7	14	7	39
Lobos	3	0	7	7	17

at Jackson Field, Alpine, Texas

- Date: September 21
- Game time: 1:00 p.m. CDT
- Game weather: Cloudy, 89 °F (32 °C)
- Game attendance: 120
- Referee: Steve Hill
- TV: FloSports
- Box score, Recap

Game information
First quarter
- WOU – Keaton Emmett 25-yard field goal, 9:02. Wolves 3–0. Drive: 8 plays, 28 yards, 2:56.
- SRS – Carlos Arreola 37-yard field goal, 1:47. Tied 3–3. Drive: 13 plays, 58 yards, 7:10.
- WOU – Jermaine Land 44-yard run (Kainoa Jones pass to Garrett Olson), 0:19. Wolves 11–3. Drive: 6 plays, 62 yards, 1:22.

Second quarter

- WOU – Keyvaun Eady 12-yard pass from Jordan McCarty (Keaton Emmett kick), 1:35. Wolves 18–3. Drive: 9 plays, 68 yards, 2:44.

Third quarter

- WOU – Kainoa Jones 2-yard run (Keaton Emmett kick), 6:01. Wolves 25–3. Drive: 13 plays, 86 yards, 5:51.
- WOU – Jordan McCarty 1-yard run (Keaton Emmett kick), 0:33. Wolves 32–3. Drive: 9 plays, 45 yards, 2:48.
- SRS – Carson Workman 75-yard run (Carlos Arreola kick), 0:19. Wolves 32–10. Drive: 1 play, 75 yards, 0:14.

Fourth quarter

- WOU – Fresh Ison 7-yard run (Keaton Emmett kick), 4:56. Wolves 39–10. Drive: 10 plays, 63 yards, 4:39.
- SRS – Yamil Oaxaca 14-yard pass from Tucker Birdwell (Carlos Arreola kick), 2:25. Wolves 39–17. Drive: 3 plays, 37 yards, 1:08.

Statistics	WOU	SRS
First downs	24	20
Total yards	389	295
Rushing yards	259	129
Passing yards	130	166
Turnovers	2	2
Time of possession	31:10	28:50

Team	Category	Player	Statistics
Western Oregon	Passing	Kainoa Jones	6/12, 76 yards
Western Oregon	Rushing	Jermaine Land	5 rushes, 53 yards, TD
Western Oregon	Receiving	Armaad Hubbard	1 reception, 38 yards
Sul Ross	Passing	Andrew Martinez	18/31, 112 yards, 2 INT
Sul Ross	Rushing	Carson Workman	2 rushes, 72 yards, TD
Sul Ross	Receiving	Yamil Oaxaca	7 receptions, 57 yards, TD

=== At Texas A&M–Kingsville ===
Sul Ross Lobos at Texas A&M–Kingsville Javelinas – Game summary

Quarter	1	2	3	4	Total
Lobos	7	7	7	0	21
Javelinas	14	14	21	7	56

at Javelina Stadium, Kingsville, Texas

- Date: September 28
- Game time: 7:00 p.m. CDT
- Game weather: Sunny
- Game attendance: 10,500
- Referee: Onare Brown
- TV: FloSports
- Box score, Recap

Game information
First quarter
- AMK – Roger Hagan 2-yard run (Gilbert Garza kick), 9:32. Javelinas 7–0. Drive: 8 plays, 45 yards, 3:19.
- SRS – Austin Ogunmakin 49-yard pass from Andrew Martinez (Carlos Arreola kick), 5:47. Tied 7–7. Drive: 7 plays, 75 yards, 3:45.
- AMK – Santana Scott 8-yard run (Gilbert Garza kick), 3:22. Javelinas 14–7. Drive: 7 plays, 63 yards, 2:19.

Second quarter

- AMK – Jackson Allen 13-yard pass from Teague Sedtal (Gilbert Garza kick), 6:46. Javelinas 21–7. Drive: 9 plays, 49 yards, 4:30.
- SRS – Yamil Oaxaca 5-yard pass from Andrew Martinez (Carlos Arreola kick), 1:10. Javelinas 21–14. Drive: 16 plays, 73 yards, 5:30.
- AMK – Isaiah Smalls 8-yard pass from Teague Sedtal (Gilbert Garza kick), 0:04. Javelinas 28–14. Drive: 11 plays, 83 yards, 1:06.

Third quarter

- AMK – Isaiah Smalls 33-yard pass from Teague Sedtal (Gilbert Garza kick), 11:51. Javelinas 35–14. Drive: 7 plays, 75 yards, 3:09.
- AMK – Santana Scott 21-yard pass from Teague Sedtal (Gilbert Garza kick), 10:18. Javelinas 42–14. Drive: 3 plays, 20 yards, 0:58.
- SRS – Tucker Birdwell 1-yard run (Carlos Arreola kick), 3:36. Javelinas 42–21. Drive: 16 plays, 65 yards, 6:42.
- AMK – Raymond Hudson 2-yard run (Gilbert Garza kick), 0:40. Javelinas 49–21. Drive: 6 plays, 75 yards, 2:56.

Fourth quarter

- AMK – Kannon Williams 5-yard run (Gilbert Garza kick), 4:35. Javelinas 56–21. Drive: 15 plays, 76 yards, 8:49.

Statistics	SRS	AMK
First downs	20	29
Total yards	348	484
Rushing yards	2	221
Passing yards	346	263
Turnovers	0	0
Time of possession	27:53	32:07

Team	Category	Player	Statistics
Sul Ross	Passing	Andrew Martinez	13/25, 227 yards, 2 TD
Sul Ross	Rushing	Carson Workman	4 rushes, 22 yards
Sul Ross	Receiving	Austin Ogunmakin	5 receptions, 150 yards, TD
Texas A&M–Kingsville	Passing	Teague Sedtal	17/25, 230 yards, 4 TD
Texas A&M–Kingsville	Rushing	Roger Hagan	14 rushes, 72 yards, TD
Texas A&M–Kingsville	Receiving	Isaiah Smalls	3 receptions, 67 yards, 2 TD

=== At Midwestern State ===
Sul Ross Lobos at Midwestern State Mustangs – Game summary

Quarter	1	2	3	4	Total
Lobos	0	7	7	7	21
Mustangs	13	17	10	0	40

at Memorial Stadium, Wichita Falls, Texas

- Date: October 12
- Game time: 7:00 p.m. CDT
- Game weather: Sunny
- Game attendance: 5,127
- Referee: Xavier Velazquez
- TV: FloSports
- Box score, Recap

Game information
First quarter
- MSU – Jimmy Trilla 28-yard pass from Andrew Knebel (Joseph Carlson kick), 9:47. Mustangs 7–0. Drive: 9 plays, 76 yards, 5:07.
- MSU – Andrew Knebel 8-yard run (kick failed), 0:40. Mustangs 13–0. Drive: 9 plays, 50 yards, 4:54.

Second quarter

- MSU – Larry Donnell 96-yard interception return (Joseph Carlson kick), 8:53. Mustangs 20–0.
- MSU – Demonte Greene 27-yard pass from Andrew Knebel (Joseph Carlson kick), 3:13. Mustangs 27–0. Drive: 7 plays, 61 yards, 3:13.
- SRS – Andrew Martinez 21-yard run (Carlos Arreola kick), 1:02. Mustangs 27–7. Drive: 6 plays, 65 yards, 2:04.
- MSU – Joseph Carlson 27-yard field goal, 0:19. Mustangs 30–7. Drive: 5 plays, 67 yards, 0:39.

Third quarter

- MSU – Karter Houchin 34-yard interception return (Joseph Carlson kick), 9:31. Mustangs 37–7.
- SRS – Kyle Callicoatte 2-yard run (Carlos Arreola kick), 6:30. Mustangs 37–14. Drive: 8 plays, 75 yards, 3:01.
- MSU – Joseph Carlson 48-yard field goal, 0:20. Mustangs 40–14. Drive: 7 plays, 30 yards, 3:07.

Fourth quarter

- SRS – Yamil Oaxaca 9-yard pass from Tucker Bridwell (Carlos Arreola kick), 13:19. Mustangs 40–21. Drive: 5 plays, 75 yards, 2:01.

Statistics	SRS	MSU
First downs	14	17
Total yards	301	335
Rushing yards	61	145
Passing yards	240	190
Turnovers	3	0
Time of possession	26:47	33:13

Team	Category	Player	Statistics
Sul Ross	Passing	Tucker Bridwell	8/18, 113 yards, TD
Sul Ross	Rushing	Kendrick Jefferson	4 rushes, 29 yards
Sul Ross	Receiving	Austin Ogunmakin	4 receptions, 90 yards
Midwestern State	Passing	Andrew Knebel	16/25, 190 yards, 2 TD
Midwestern State	Rushing	Devin Cross	11 rushes, 60 yards
Midwestern State	Receiving	Demonte Greene	2 receptions, 89 yards, TD

=== Western New Mexico ===
Western New Mexico Mustangs at Sul Ross Lobos – Game summary

Quarter	1	2	3	4	Total
Mustangs	10	0	0	10	20
Lobos	0	7	14	13	34

at Jackson Field, Alpine, Texas

- Date: October 19
- Game time: 7:00 p.m. CDT
- Game weather: Sunny, 70 °F (21 °C)
- Game attendance: 208
- Referee: John Sasse
- TV: FloSports
- Box score, Recap

Game information
First quarter
- WNM – Zach Gordon 23-yard field goal, 7:18. Mustangs 3–0. Drive: 9 plays, 61 yards, 4:19.
- WNM – Josh Magana 2-yard run (Zach Gordon kick), 3:41. Mustangs 10–0. Drive: 4 plays, 33 yards, 1:19.

Second quarter

- SRS – Jordan Morales 5-yard run (Carlos Arreola kick), 0:57. Mustangs 10–7. Drive: 4 plays, 56 yards, 1:04.

Third quarter

- SRS – Vicente Luevano 4-yard pass from Andrew Martinez (Carlos Arreola kick), 6:09. Lobos 14–10. Drive: 14 plays, 85 yards, 5:12.
- SRS – Austin Ogunmakin 10-yard pass from Andrew Martinez (Carlos Arreola kick), 0:06. Lobos 21–10. Drive: 7 plays, 40 yards, 3:45.

Fourth quarter

- SRS – Andrew Martinez 27-yard run (Carlos Arreola kick), 11:57. Lobos 28–10. Drive: 4 plays, 45 yards, 1:57.
- WNM – Zach Gordon 28-yard field goal, 8:28. Lobos 28–13. Drive: 9 plays, 58 yards, 3:29.
- SRS – Quincy Blair 70-yard interception return (kick blocked), 3:50. Lobos 34–13.
- WNM – Deuce Zimmerman 1-yard pass from Connor Ackerley (Zach Gordon kick), 1:55. Lobos 34–20. Drive: 7 plays, 50 yards, 1:55.

Statistics	WNM	SRS
First downs	19	19
Total yards	316	306
Rushing yards	64	84
Passing yards	252	222
Turnovers	4	0
Time of possession	30:00	30:00

Team	Category	Player	Statistics
Western New Mexico	Passing	Josh Magana	11/18, 132 yards, INT
Western New Mexico	Rushing	Josh Magana	14 rushes, 23 yards, TD
Western New Mexico	Receiving	Anthony Flores	6 receptions, 89 yards
Sul Ross	Passing	Andrew Martinez	19/31, 222 yards, 2 TD
Sul Ross	Rushing	Jordan Morales	14 rushes, 66 yards, TD
Sul Ross	Receiving	Austin Ogunmakin	10 receptions, 167 yards, TD

=== At Angelo State ===
Sul Ross Lobos at Angelo State Rams – Game summary

Quarter	1	2	3	4	Total
Lobos	3	7	0	0	10
Rams	14	22	7	14	57

at LeGrand Sports Complex, San Angelo, Texas

- Date: October 26
- Game time: 6:00 p.m. CST
- Game weather: Sunny, 81 °F (27 °C)
- Game attendance: 5,349
- Referee: Wayne Elliott
- TV: FloSports
- Box score, Recap

Game information
First quarter
- SRS – Carlos Arreola 41-yard field goal, 10:38. Lobos 3–0. Drive: 5 plays, 56 yards, 2:09.
- ASU – Eric Rascoe 26-yard interception return (Bradley Larson kick), 7:00. Rams 7–3.
- ASU – Cameron Dischler 2-yard run (Bradley Larson kick), 0:47. Rams 14–3. Drive: 8 plays, 58 yards, 3:54.

Second quarter

- SRS – Yamil Oaxaca 23-yard pass from Andrew Martinez (Carlos Arreola kick), 8:37. Rams 14–10. Drive: 12 plays, 75 yards, 7:10.
- ASU – Jayden Jones 4-yard run (Cade Fuller run), 4:41. Rams 22–10. Drive: 7 plays, 93 yards, 3:50.
- ASU – Cameron Dischler 2-yard run (Bradley Larson kick), 1:58. Rams 29–10. Drive: 5 plays, 48 yards, 1:13.
- ASU – Cameron Dischler 27-yard pass from Braeden Fuller (Bradley Larson kick), 1:37. Rams 36–10. Drive: 1 play, 27 yards, 0:10.

Third quarter

- ASU – Jayden Jones 1-yard run (Bradley Larson kick), 3:57. Rams 43–10. Drive: 6 plays, 54 yards, 3:00.

Fourth quarter

- ASU – Zeek Freeman 38-yard pass from Kaeden Smith (Bradley Larson kick), 14:12. Rams 50–10. Drive: 7 plays, 72 yards, 3:38.
- ASU – Canon Wiese 8-yard run (Bradley Larson kick), 4:20. Rams 57–10. Drive: 4 plays, 42 yards, 1:52.

Statistics	SRS	ASU
First downs	8	28
Total yards	173	548
Rushing yards	39	195
Passing yards	134	353
Turnovers	2	1
Time of possession	25:39	34:21

Team	Category	Player	Statistics
Sul Ross	Passing	Andrew Martinez	11/18, 128 yards, TD, 2 INT
Sul Ross	Rushing	Jordan Morales	10 rushes, 31 yards
Sul Ross	Receiving	Austin Ogunmakin	2 receptions, 57 yards
Angelo State	Passing	Braeden Fuller	17/23, 287 yards, TD
Angelo State	Rushing	Jayden Jones	11 rushes, 80 yards, 2 TD
Angelo State	Receiving	Zeek Freeman	3 receptions, 81 yards, TD

=== Eastern New Mexico ===
Eastern New Mexico Greyhounds at Sul Ross Lobos – Game summary

Quarter	1	2	3	4	Total
Greyhounds	7	7	14	0	28
Lobos	7	0	10	16	33

at Jackson Field, Alpine, Texas

- Date: November 2
- Game time: 1:00 p.m. CST
- Game weather: Cloudy, 75 °F (24 °C)
- Game attendance: 187
- Referee: Daniel Mena
- TV: FloSports
- Box score, Recap

Game information
First quarter
- SRS – Yamil Oaxaca 99-yard kickoff return (Carlos Arreola kick), 14:47. Lobos 7–0.
- ENM – Jarius Stewart 3-yard run (Cooper Hamilton kick), 2:35. Tied 7–7. Drive: 13 plays, 80 yards, 6:51.

Second quarter

- ENM – Samu Vave 5-yard fumble return (Cooper Hamilton kick), 1:51. Greyhounds 14–7.

Third quarter

- SRS – Jordan Morales 85-yard run (Carlos Arreola kick), 11:49. Tied 14–14. Drive: 1 play, 85 yards, 0:13.
- ENM – Azorion Sterling 50-yard run (Cooper Hamilton kick), 8:44. Greyhounds 21–14. Drive: 7 plays, 75 yards, 3:05.
- SRS – Carlos Arreola 57-yard field goal, 6:40. Greyhounds 21–17. Drive: 5 plays, 30 yards, 1:57.
- ENM – Ron Craten 23-yard run (Cooper Hamilton kick), 1:57. Greyhounds 28–17. Drive: 9 plays, 75 yards, 4:43.

Fourth quarter

- SRS – Jordan Morales 5-yard run (Carlos Arreola kick), 14:56. Greyhounds 28–24. Drive: 7 plays, 45 yards, 1:58.
- SRS – Carlos Arreola 47-yard field goal, 8:42. Greyhounds 28–27. Drive: 7 plays, 38 yards, 3:39.
- SRS – Carson Workman 21-yard run (run failed), 1:50. Lobos 33–28. Drive: 7 plays, 61 yards, 2:37.

Statistics	ENM	SRS
First downs	22	18
Total yards	484	399
Rushing yards	376	191
Passing yards	108	208
Turnovers	1	2
Time of possession	36:34	23:26

Team	Category	Player	Statistics
Eastern New Mexico	Passing	Mario Sanchez	8/15, 108 yards, INT
Eastern New Mexico	Rushing	Ron Craten	22 rushes, 178 yards, TD
Eastern New Mexico	Receiving	Daniel Ceniceros	1 reception, 27 yards
Sul Ross	Passing	Andrew Martinez	13/24, 154 yards, INT
Sul Ross	Rushing	Jordan Morales	6 rushes, 122 yards, 2 TD
Sul Ross	Receiving	Yamil Oaxaca	4 receptions, 61 yards

=== At Central Washington ===
Sul Ross Lobos at Central Washington Wildcats – Game summary

Quarter	1	2	3	4	Total
Lobos	0	0	0	0	0
Wildcats	35	24	7	0	66

at Tomlinson Stadium, Ellensburg, Washington

- Date: November 9
- Game time: 8:00 p.m. CST/6:00 p.m. PST
- Game weather: Rain, 46 °F (8 °C)
- Game attendance: 4,457
- Referee: Esrael Silva
- TV: FloSports
- Box score, Recap

Game information
First quarter
- CWU – Marcus Cook 83-yard pass from Kennedy McGill (Cooper Britton kick), 14:34. Wildcats 7–0. Drive: 1 play, 83 yards, 0:12.
- CWU – Andrew Molloy 24-yard pass from Kennedy McGill (Cooper Britton kick), 11:23. Wildcats 14–0. Drive: 5 plays, 65 yards, 2:48.
- CWU – Tyler Flanagan 6-yard run (Cooper Britton kick), 6:59. Wildcats 21–0. Drive: 4 plays, 32 yards, 2:02.
- CWU – Beau Phillips 23-yard run (Cooper Britton kick), 1:10. Wildcats 28–0. Drive: 9 plays, 59 yards, 4:11.
- CWU – Kennedy McGill 30-yard run (Cooper Britton kick), 0:55. Wildcats 35–0. Drive: 1 play, 30 yards, 0:09.

Second quarter

- CWU – Cam Daniels 5-yard run (Cooper Britton kick), 14:08. Wildcats 42–0. Drive: 3 plays, 26 yards, 3:57.
- CWU – Stephen Woodward 1-yard run (Cooper Britton kick), 13:37. Wildcats 49–0. Drive: 1 play, 1 yard, 0:01.
- CWU – Tyler Flanagan 21-yard run (Cooper Britton kick), 8:17. Wildcats 56–0. Drive: 4 plays, 64 yards, 2:22.
- CWU – Cooper Britton 38-yard field goal, 1:56. Wildcats 59–0. Drive: 6 plays, 51 yards, 3:54.

Third quarter

- CWU – Ki'Marree Washington 13-yard run (Cooper Britton kick), 1:28. Wildcats 66–0. Drive: 13 plays, 60 yards, 8:27.

Fourth quarter

- No scoring plays

Statistics	SRS	CWU
First downs	8	23
Total yards	86	507
Rushing yards	8	367
Passing yards	78	140
Turnovers	6	0
Time of possession	12:05	27:55

Team	Category	Player	Statistics
Sul Ross	Passing	Tucker Bridwell	5/17, 58 yards, 2 INT
Sul Ross	Rushing	Carson Workman	9 rushes, 27 yards
Sul Ross	Receiving	Vicente Luevano	2 receptions, 42 yards
Central Washington	Passing	Kennedy McGill	8/10, 140 yards, 3 TD
Central Washington	Rushing	Tyler Flanagan	10 rushes, 89 yards, 2 TD
Central Washington	Receiving	Marcus Cook	3 receptions, 85 yards, TD

=== UT Permian Basin ===
UT Permian Basin Falcons at Sul Ross Lobos – Game summary

Quarter	1	2	3	4	Total
Falcons	28	20	14	13	75
Lobos	0	0	7	0	7

at Jackson Field, Alpine, Texas

- Date: November 16
- Game time: 12:00 p.m. CST
- Game weather: Sunny, 75 °F (24 °C)
- Game attendance: 200
- Referee: Neil Dilts
- TV: FloSports
- Box score, Recap

Game information
First quarter
- UTPB – Deon Cook 77-yard pass from Issac Mooring (Gunnar Abseck run), 14:42. Falcons 8–0. Drive: 1 play, 77 yards, 0:13.
- UTPB – Kory Harris 1-yard run (pass failed), 10:11. Falcons 14–0. Drive: 8 plays, 59 yards, 2:43.
- UTPB – Jeremiah Cooley 4-yard pass from Issac Mooring (Rafael Vargas kick), 5:08. Falcons 21–0. Drive: 7 plays, 60 yards, 3:04.
- UTPB – Jeremiah Cooley 11-yard pass from Issac Mooring (Rafael Vargas kick), 0:39. Falcons 28–0. Drive: 5 plays, 61 yards, 2:23.

Second quarter

- UTPB – Deon Cook 9-yard pass from Issac Mooring (kick failed), 12:09. Falcons 34–0. Drive: 6 plays, 80 yards, 2:05.
- UTPB – Kory Harris 11-yard run (Angel Diaz kick), 3:54. Falcons 41–0. Drive: 12 plays, 80 yards, 5:18.
- UTPB – Ben Patterson 6-yard pass from Issac Mooring (Angel Diaz kick), 1:25. Falcons 48–0. Drive: 6 plays, 22 yards, 1:33.

Third quarter

- UTPB – Kory Harris 28-yard run (Angel Diaz kick), 11:20. Falcons 55–0. Drive: 6 plays, 50 yards, 2:17.
- UTPB – Ashton Hamby 25-yard fumble return (Angel Diaz kick), 11:04. Falcons 62–0.
- SRS – Gunner Hammond 4-yard run (Carlos Arreola kick), 4:02. Falcons 62–7. Drive: 11 plays, 75 yards, 7:02.

Fourth quarter

- UTPB – Kory Harris 53-yard run (kick failed), 12:26. Falcons 68–7. Drive: 3 plays, 61 yards, 0:53.
- UTPB – Christian Kaopua 7-yard run (Angel Diaz kick), 8:24. Falcons 75–7. Drive: 5 plays, 42 yards, 3:46.

Statistics	UTPB	SRS
First downs	34	15
Total yards	711	231
Rushing yards	318	70
Passing yards	393	161
Turnovers	0	3
Time of possession	33:16	26:44

Team	Category	Player	Statistics
UT Permian Basin	Passing	Issac Mooring	26/28, 353 yards, 5 TD
UT Permian Basin	Rushing	Kory Harris	26 rushes, 201 yards, 4 TD
UT Permian Basin	Receiving	Deon Cook	6 receptions, 148 yards, 2 TD
Sul Ross	Passing	Tucker Bridwell	8/21, 123 yards, 2 INT
Sul Ross	Rushing	Kye Callicoatte	9 rushes, 27 yards
Sul Ross	Receiving	Nathan Crawford	3 receptions, 72 yards

== Personnel ==
=== Roster ===
2024 Sul Ross Lobos football team roster
Players
Coaches
Offense

Pos.	#	Name	Class
WR	1	Yamil Oaxaca	So
WR	3	Austin Ogunmakin	Sr
WR	5	C. J. Parks	Sr
WR	6	Vicente Luevano	Sr
RB	8	Kendrick Jefferson	Jr
QB	11	Andrew Martinez	Jr
QB	12	Kye Callicoatte	Fr
RB	14	Cordrick Dunn	Sr
QB	16	Gunner Hammond	Jr
QB	17	Nicolas Lee	So
QB	18	Tucker Bridwell	Sr
TE	19	Landen Drake	So
RB	21	Jordan Morales	Fr
WR	27	Diego Oaxaca	Fr
RB	28	Carson Workman	Fr
WR	35	Jackson Carroll	Jr
WR	37	Tray Toliver	So
RB	38	Adrian Estrada	So
WR	39	Jeremiah Rodriguez	So
TE	45	Clayton Gift	Fr
OL	51	Jonathan Zamora	Fr
OL	60	Maximiliano Alvarado	Sr
OL	61	Michael Longoria	Fr
OL	62	Paolo Casas-Silva	Fr
OL	63	Drew Coker	So
OL	64	Xavier Garcia	Sr
OL	65	Robert Allen	Jr
OL	66	Ryan Faulk	Fr
OL	67	Travyon Young	So
OL	68	Marcus Jefferson Jr.	Fr
OL	70	Jackson Pond	Fr
OL	71	Judson Cook	Fr
OL	72	Solomon Ussery	Jr
OL	73	Quattro Perez	Fr
OL	74	Joel Woods	So
OL	75	Andre Alfaro	Jr
OL	76	Sebastian Lefeiloai-Momoli	Jr
OL	78	Alexander Richardson	Fr
OL	79	Brady Marshall	Fr
WR	80	Isaiah Pena	So
WR	81	Chu-Chu Doe	Jr
WR	82	Liam Lowe	Fr
WR	83	Terence Norman Jr.	Sr
WR	84	Kendrick Hanks Jr.	Fr
TE	85	Diego Coleman	Fr
WR	86	Aamir Almusawwir	Jr
WR	87	Spencer Distefano	Fr
TE	89	Justin Moon	Jr
OL		Christen Barnwell	So
OL		Elton Caldwell	Fr
WR		Javante Carson	Fr
RB		Izayuh Claudio	Fr
WR		Nathan Crawford	Fr
WR		Omarion Dumas	Fr
WR		Malik Francis	So
QB		Victor Jesus Gutierrez	Fr
OL		Hector Herrera	So
OL		Nicholas Jones	So
WR		Evan Macias	Fr
WR		Julius Maddox	Fr
WR		Wyatt Nelson	Jr
WR		Marco Ruiz	Fr
WR		Walter Sherman-Thompson IV	Fr
RB		Jaden Tackett-Jewell	Fr
RB		Mikeviun Titus	Jr

Defense

Pos.	#	Name	Class
DB	1	Brendon Martin	Jr
DB	2	Quincy Blair	Sr
DB	4	Evian Thompson	So
LB	9	Kameron Dickerson	GS
LB	10	Jonathan Fuamatu	Jr
DB	13	Alec Garcia	Sr
LB	15	Tamirr Bullock	Jr
OLB	20	Aron Olague	Jr
LB	22	Michael Momoh	So
DB	23	Mark Benard	Sr
DB	24	Elijah Gomez	Sr
CB	26	Quentin Ellis	Fr
SS	29	Anthony Lacy	Jr
LB	30	Alex Holguin	Sr
LB	31	Seth Scott	Fr
MLB	32	Caleb Jones	Fr
OLB	33	Tresean Gilmore	Fr
OLB	34	George Fatoke	Fr
OLB	36	Humberto Moreno	Jr
OLB	40	McLain Garrett IV	Fr
DB	41	Andrew Henderson	Sr
DE	42	Dhaylen Stanton	Fr
DL	43	Roderick Drumgo Jr.	Fr
DE	44	Maurice Taylor	Sr
DB	47	Travanta Simien	So
LB, DE	48	Micah Leejay	So
DB	49	Efeosa Edomwandagbon	Fr
DL	50	Mekhi Harris	Fr
LB	52	Logan Dewald	So
DL	53	Seth Ortega	Jr
DL	57	Desmond Hill	So
DL	77	Jacob Morales	Jr
DL	88	Brayden Durocher	Fr
DL	90	Dayln Dunbar	GS
DL	91	Jason Champlin	Jr
DL	92	Ta'bias Jackson	Jr
DT	93	Xavier Gaines	So
DL	94	Victor Villa	Jr
DL	95	Samuel Hernandez Jr.	Fr
DL	96	Keon Wilson	Fr
DL	97	Woodburn Schofield	So
DL	98	Kelvin Melton Jr.	Jr
DT	99	Jacob Johnson	So
OLB		Kendall Beard	Fr
DB		Bryan Bege	Fr
DL		Owen Boyle	Fr
DL		Kelvin Brotherton Jr.	Fr
DB		Ivory Chester	Fr
DB		Skylar Chester	Fr
LB		Brice Chevalier	Fr
DL		Zychael Davis	Fr
DB		Jacob Dillard	Fr
DL		Timothy Galloway	Fr
OLB		Tymere Gibson	Jr
DL		Francisco Hernandez Jr.	Fr
DL		Jordan Hooks	Fr
DB		Michael Johnson III	Fr
DE		Winsor Johnson-Andrews	Fr
DB		Dilyon Link	Fr
DB		Nick Mendoza	So
DB		Anthony Miranda Jr.	Fr
DB		Zephaniah Nelson	Sr
DB		Elijah Rolfe	Fr
OLB		Caleb Shepard	So
LB		Dempsey Spears II	Fr
DB		Demetrius Steptoe	Fr
OLB		Dasen Tinney-Anderson	Fr
DB		Johnathon Whittle	Fr
CB		Christian Wynn	Fr

Special teams

Pos.	#	Name	Class
K	7	Carlos Arreola	So
P	25	Jacob Franco	Fr
LS	46	Ebenezer Malone	Fr
LS	56	Peyten Pavliska	So
LS		Dawson Tello	So

Head coach

- Barry Derickson

Coordinators/assistant coaches

- Cadron Davis
  Assistant head coach/Defensive coordinator
- Christian Escobar
  Offensive coordinator
- Billy Jack Ray
  Offensive line
- Fowler Freund
  Slot wide receivers/Specialists
- Eric Daniels
  Defensive run game/Linebackers
- Jeremy Aquino
  Special teams coordinator/Defensive line
- Kurt Harmening
  Chief of staff/Scouting and recruiting
- Isaiah Bravo
  Quarterbacks
- Ricardo Salinas
  Offensive line
- Andy Rivera
  Offensive line
- Nick Caruthers
  Tight ends
- Sean Smith
  Running backs
- Josh Munoz
  Guards and tackles
- Javeon Mosses
  Outside linebackers
- Justin Rogers
  Defensive backs

Legend

- (C) Team captain
- (S) Suspended
- (I) Ineligible
- Injured
- Redshirt

Roster
Last update: August 28, 2024

=== Recruiting ===
The Lobos' 2024 recruiting class consisted of 57 players: 28 offensive players, 28 defensive players, and one special teams player.

== Weekly awards ==
- LSC Offensive Player of the Week

Jordan Morales (week 9 vs. Eastern New Mexico)

- LSC Special Teams Player of the Week

Carlos Arreola (week 9 vs. Eastern New Mexico)
