= Barry Derickson =

American football coach (born c. 1988)

Biographical details
- Born: c. 1988 (age 37–38)
- Education: University of Wisconsin–Oshkosh (2013); Angelo State University (2015)

Playing career
- 2007–2010: Wisconsin–Oshkosh
- Position: Left tackle

Coaching career (HC unless noted)
- 2011–2012: Wisconsin–Oshkosh (IWR/TE)
- 2013: Angelo State (GA)
- 2014 (spring): Bemidji State (GA)
- 2014–2015: Howard Payne (co-OC/OL)
- 2016 (spring): Independence (co-OC/OL)
- 2016–2017: Oconto Falls HS (WI)
- 2018 (spring): Eastern Kentucky (OQC)
- 2018: Wisconsin–Stevens Point (AHC/DL)
- 2019: Navarro (co-OC/OL)
- 2020: Valparaiso (TE)
- 2021: Sul Ross (OC)
- 2022: Sul Ross (OC/interim HC)
- 2023–2024: Sul Ross

Head coaching record
- Overall: 11–20 (college); 2–17 (high school)

Barry Derickson (born c. 1988) is an American college football coach. He was most recently the head football coach for Sul Ross State University, a position he held from 2022 to 2024. He was the head football coach for Oconto Falls High School from 2016 to 2017. He also coached for Wisconsin–Oshkosh, Angelo State, Bemidji State, Howard Payne, Independence CC, Eastern Kentucky, Wisconsin–Stevens Point, Navarro College, and Valparaiso. He played college football for Wisconsin–Oshkosh as a left tackle.

== Coaching career ==
=== Sul Ross ===
Derickson was hired as the offensive coordinator at Sul Ross just before the start of the 2021 season after the Lobos' incumbent OC, Kevin Canty, died at age 37 due to complications from COVID-19.

Following the 2021 season, Sul Ross head coach John Pearce announced that he was resigning on November 30. Following Pearce's resignation, Derickson was named the Lobos' interim head coach. Derickson lead the 2022 team under the interim tag for the entire season before being named the program's full-time head coach on November 18, 2022.

Prior to the 2023 season, Derickson was named to Dave Campbell's Texas Football "40 Coaches under 40" list. The 2023 season was the last the Lobos competed in the American Southwest Conference as the program began its transition period from NCAA Division III to Division II.

The Lobos competed in the 2024 season as a member of the Lone Star Conference at the Division II level. After leading the Lobos through their inaugural season in Division II, Derickson announced that he was resigning on December 2, 2024; Derickson finished his career at Sul Ross with an overall record of 11–20.

== Head coaching record ==
=== College ===
Year	Team	Overall	Conference	Standing	Bowl/playoffs
Sul Ross Lobos (American Southwest Conference) (2022–2023)
2022	Sul Ross	4–6	4–4	T–4th	
2023	Sul Ross	4–6	0–0	N/A	
Sul Ross Lobos (Lone Star Conference) (2024)
2024	Sul Ross	3–8	2–7	8th	
Sul Ross:		11–20	9–15		
Total:		11–20			

=== High school ===
Year	Team	Overall	Conference	Standing	Bowl/playoffs
Oconto Falls Panthers () (2016–2017)
2016	Oconto Falls	2–7	1–7	8th	
2017	Oconto Falls	0–10	0–9	9th	
Oconto Falls:		2–17	1–16		
Total:		2–17			
