= 2022 Sul Ross Lobos football team =

American college football season

2022 Sul Ross Lobos football
- Conference: American Southwest Conference
- Record: 4–6 (4–4 ASC)
- Head coach: Barry Derickson (interim; 1st season)
- Offensive scheme: Air raid
- Defensive coordinator: Eric Eisenberg (2nd season)
- Co-defensive coordinator: Keafer Clegg (1st season)
- Base defense: 3–4
- Home stadium: Jackson Field

2022 American Southwest Conference football standings
	Conf.			Overall
Team	W		L	W		L
No. 3 Mary Hardin–Baylor $^	8	–	0	12	–	2
No. 12 Hardin–Simmons ^	7	–	1	9	–	2
Howard Payne	6	–	2	7	–	3
East Texas Baptist	4	–	4	5	–	5
Sul Ross	4	–	4	4	–	6
Texas Lutheran	3	–	5	4	–	6
Southwestern (TX)	2	–	6	3	–	7
Austin	1	–	7	1	–	9
McMurry	1	–	7	1	–	9
$ – Conference champion; ^ – NCAA Division III playoff participant; Rankings from AFCA Poll

The 2022 Sul Ross Lobos football team represented Sul Ross State University during the 2022 NCAA Division III football season as a member of the American Southwest Conference (ASC). The Lobos were led by first-year head coach Barry Derickson and played their home games at Jackson Field in Alpine, Texas. The team finished with an overall record of 4–6 with a conference record of 4–4. Derickson coached the entire 2022 season as an interim head coach and was later named the program's full-time head coach on November 18 following the conclusion of the regular season.

== Schedule ==
Date	Time	Opponent	Site	Result	Attendance
September 3	6:00 p.m.	at No. 9 Trinity (TX)*	Trinity Stadium; San Antonio, TX	L 7–55	2,022
September 10	7:00 p.m.	at Texas A&M–Kingsville*	Javelina Stadium; Kingsville, TX	L 14–35	3,800
September 17	1:00 p.m.	Austin	Jackson Field; Alpine, TX	W 55–14	185
September 24	6:00 p.m.	at Texas Lutheran	Bulldog Stadium; Seguin, TX	W 28–14	1,000
October 1	1:00 p.m.	Howard Payne	Jackson Field; Alpine, TX	L 42–56	175
October 8	1:00 p.m.	at No. 10 Hardin–Simmons	Shelton Stadium; Abilene, TX	L 35–70	2,523
October 22	1:00 p.m.	at No. 4 Mary Hardin–Baylor	Crusader Stadium; Belton, TX	L 14–45	3,183
October 29	1:00 p.m.	McMurry^{†}	Jackson Field; Alpine, TX (Battle of I-20)	W 33–27	165
November 5	1:00 p.m.	at East Texas Baptist	Ornelas Stadium; Marshall, TX	L 14–17	1,013
November 12	1:00 p.m.	Southwestern (TX)	Jackson Field; Alpine, TX	W 44–41	200
*Non-conference game; ^{†}Homecoming; Rankings from D3Football.com Poll released prior to the game; All times are in Central time

== Offseason ==
=== Coaching changes ===
On November 30, 2021, it was announced that head coach John Pearce was resigning after eight seasons as the Lobos' head coach. Pearce finished his career at Sul Ross with an overall record of 23–51. Under Pearce the Lobos finished the 2016 season with a record of 6–4, the program's first winning record in a decade. That same day, November 30, the university announced that offensive coordinator Barry Derickson had been named interim coach for the Lobos.

== Preseason ==
=== ASC media poll ===
The ASC preseason media poll was released on August 17, 2022. The Lobos were predicted to finish eighth in the conference.

== Game summaries ==
=== At No. 9 Trinity (TX) ===
Sul Ross Lobos at No. 9 Trinity Tigers – Game summary

Quarter	1	2	3	4	Total
Lobos	0	7	0	0	7
No. 9 Tigers	14	21	20	0	55

at Trinity Stadium, San Antonio, Texas

- Date: September 3
- Game time: 6:00 p.m. CDT
- Game weather: Sunny
- Game attendance: 2,022
- Referee: Ken Roan
- Box score, Recap

Game information
First quarter
- TU – Legend Grigsby 13-yard run (Blake Lin kick), 11:13. Tigers 7–0. Drive: 2 plays, 17 yards, 0:43.
- TU – Justin Carmouche 24-yard pass from Tucker Horn (Blake Lin kick), 2:23. Tigers 14–0. Drive: 4 plays, 60 yards, 1:42.

Second quarter

- TU – Caleb Crawford 25-yard pass from Tucker Horn (Blake Lin kick), 13:18. Tigers 21–0. Drive: 5 plays, 29 yards, 1:42.
- SRS – Vicente Luevano 14-yard pass from T. J. DeShields (Jaden Brown kick), 9:15. Tigers 21–7. Drive: 7 plays, 83 yards, 3:58.
- TU – Justin Carmouche 3-yard run (Blake Lin kick), 6:25. Tigers 28–7. Drive: 5 plays, 45 yards, 0:19.
- TU – Johnny Milo 3-yard run (Blake Lin kick), 0:22. Tigers 35–7. Drive: 10 plays, 78 yards, 4:24.

Third quarter

- TU – Justin Carmouche 9-yard run (Blake Lin kick), 11:06. Tigers 42–7. Drive: 3 plays, 69 yards, 1:01.
- TU – Ryan Merrifield 63-yard pass from Tucker Horn (Blake Lin kick), 4:45. Tigers 49–7. Drive: 1 play, 63 yards, 0:13.
- TU – Johnny Milo 13-yard pass from Ryan Back (kick failed), 0:00. Tigers 55–7. Drive: 6 plays, 76 yards, 2:59.

Fourth quarter

- No scoring plays

Statistics	SRS	TU
First downs	11	26
Total yards	156	536
Rushing yards	31	160
Passing yards	125	376
Turnovers	0	0
Time of possession	29:15	30:45

Team	Category	Player	Statistics
Sul Ross	Passing	T. J. DeShields	13/26, 114 yards, TD
Sul Ross	Rushing	Travell Lumpkin	9 rushes, 33 yards
Sul Ross	Receiving	Eddie Sinegal	1 reception, 44 yards
Trinity	Passing	Tucker Horn	16/23, 328 yards, 3 TD
Trinity	Rushing	Legend Grisby	8 rushes, 52 yards, TD
Trinity	Receiving	Ryan Merrifield	2 receptions, 113 yards, TD

=== At Texas A&M–Kingsville ===
Sul Ross Lobos at Texas A&M–Kingsville Javelinas – Game summary

Quarter	1	2	3	4	Total
Lobos	0	7	0	7	14
Javelinas	9	3	9	14	35

at Javelina Stadium, Kingsville, Texas

- Date: September 10
- Game time: 7:00 p.m. CDT
- Game weather: Sunny, 91 °F (33 °C)
- Game attendance: 3,800
- Referee: Joshua Bannerman
- Box score, Recap

Game information
First quarter
- AMK – Craig Clemons 16-yard pass from Jacob Cavazos (Gilbert Garza kick), 9:57. Javelinas 7–0. Drive: 8 plays, 23 yards, 3:01.
- AMK – Chris Ruiz punt blocked out of end zone, 1:49. Javelinas 9–0.

Second quarter

- SRS – Vicente Luevano 7-yard pass from T. J. DeShields (Jaden Brown kick), 7:57. Javelinas 9–7. Drive: 4 plays, 26 yards, 1:01.
- AMK – Gilbert Garza 25-yard field goal, 0:00. Javelinas 12–7. Drive: 14 plays, 72 yards, 1:32.

Third quarter

- AMK – Oswaldo Luna punt blocked out of end zone, 10:45. Javelinas 14–7.
- AMK – Jackson Allen 1-yard run (Gilbert Garza kick), 7:06. Javelinas 21–7. Drive: 8 plays, 50 yards, 3:33.

Fourth quarter

- AMK – Christian Anderson 1-yard run (Gilbert Garza kick), 12:56. Javelinas 28–7. Drive: 7 plays, 52 yards, 2:43.
- AMK – Roger Hagan 2-yard run (Gilbert Garza kick), 8:02. Javelinas 35–7. Drive: 7 plays, 45 yards, 3:32.
- SRS – Austin Ogunmakin 13-yard pass from T. J. DeShields (Jaden Brown kick), 4:14. Javelinas 35–14. Drive: 7 plays, 75 yards, 3:48.

Statistics	SRS	AMK
First downs	12	28
Total yards	220	426
Rushing yards	58	171
Passing yards	162	255
Turnovers	0	2
Time of possession	23:54	36:06

Team	Category	Player	Statistics
Sul Ross	Passing	T. J. DeShields	16/32, 162 yards, 2 TD
Sul Ross	Rushing	Travell Lumpkin	12 rushes, 56 yards
Sul Ross	Receiving	Austin Ogunmakin	4 receptions, 102 yards, TD
Texas A&M–Kingsville	Passing	Jacob Cavazos	25/37, 233 yards, TD
Texas A&M–Kingsville	Rushing	Christian Anderson	19 rushes, 109 yards, TD
Texas A&M–Kingsville	Receiving	Blake Hoffman	3 receptions, 50 yards

=== Austin ===
Austin Kangaroos at Sul Ross Lobos – Game summary

Quarter	1	2	3	4	Total
Kangaroos	0	7	0	7	14
Lobos	13	14	14	14	55

at Jackson Field, Alpine, Texas

- Date: September 17
- Game time: 1:00 p.m. CDT
- Game weather: Sunny, 83 °F (28 °C)
- Game attendance: 185
- Referee: Randy Adams
- Box score, Recap

Game information
First quarter
- SRS – Austin Ogunmakin 3-yard pass from T. J. DeShields (kick failed), 5:57. Lobos 6–0. Drive: 9 plays, 74 yards, 4:27.
- SRS – T. J. DeShields 1-yard run (Jaden Brown kick), 2:27. Lobos 13–0. Drive: 5 plays, 71 yards, 2:20.

Second quarter

- SRS – Vicente Luevano 66-yard pass from T. J. DeShields (Jaden Brown kick), 7:14. Lobos 20–0. Drive: 3 plays, 87 yards, 7:31.
- AUS – Tyler James 1-yard run (John Aldridge kick), 9:38. Lobos 20–7. Drive: 10 plays, 65 yards, 2:54.
- SRS – Vicente Luevano 9-yard pass from T. J. DeShields (Jaden Brown kick), 5:48. Lobos 27–7. Drive: 11 plays, 67 yards, 3:37.

Third quarter

- SRS – Vicente Luevano 58-yard pass from T. J. DeShields (Jaden Brown kick), 9:52. Lobos 34–7. Drive: 3 plays, 85 yards, 3:53.
- SRS – Eddie Sinegal 14-yard pass from T. J. DeShields (Jaden Brown kick), 3:03. Lobos 41–7. Drive: 12 plays, 80 yards, 5:22.

Fourth quarter

- SRS – Ozias Wright 14-yard pass from T. J. DeShields (Jaden Brown kick), 13:17. Lobos 48–7. Drive: 4 plays, 66 yards, 1:07.
- SRS – Vicente Luevano 20-yard pass from T. J. DeShields (Jaden Brown kick), 5:11. Lobos 55–7. Drive: 8 plays, 93 yards, 4:34.
- AUS – Ben Meraz 1-yard run (John Aldridge kick), 3:46. Lobos 55–14. Drive: 7 plays, 65 yards, 1:13.

Statistics	AUS	SRS
First downs	17	35
Total yards	259	686
Rushing yards	259	127
Passing yards	0	559
Turnovers	1	1
Time of possession	13:54	40:36

Team	Category	Player	Statistics
Austin	Passing	Tyler James	0/7, 0 yards
Austin	Rushing	Ben Meraz	11 rushes, 59 yards, TD
Austin	Receiving	None	
Sul Ross	Passing	T. J. DeShields	36/49, 550 yards, 7 TD
Sul Ross	Rushing	Travell Lumpkin	9 rushes, 64 yards
Sul Ross	Receiving	Vicente Luevano	9 receptions, 237 yards, 4 TD

The Lobos' defense held the Kangaroos' offense to 0 passing yards. Austin attempted a total of 8 passes in the game, all of which were incomplete. Tyler James attempted 7 passes for the Kangaroos while Ben Meraz attempted a single pass that resulted in an interception. Sul Ross quarterback T. J. DeShields passed for 550 yards and 7 touchdowns, both single-game program records, and was named ASC Offensive Player of the Week.

=== At Texas Lutheran ===
Sul Ross Lobos at Texas Lutheran Bulldogs – Game summary

Quarter	1	2	3	4	Total
Lobos	7	0	7	14	28
Bulldogs	7	0	7	0	14

at Bulldog Stadium, Seguin, Texas

- Date: September 24
- Game time: 6:00 p.m. CDT
- Game weather: Sunny, 92 °F (33 °C)
- Game attendance: 1,000
- Referee: James Minor
- Box score, Recap

Game information
First quarter
- TLU – Jacob Forton 1-yard run (Joaquin Rodriguez kick), 10:48. Bulldogs 7–0. Drive: 10 plays, 75 yards, 4:12.
- SRS – T. J. DeShields 1-yard run (Jaden Brown kick), 7:51. Tied 7–7. Drive: 9 plays, 76 yards, 2:52.

Second quarter

- No scoring plays

Third quarter

- SRS – Vicente Luevano 42-yard pass from T. J. DeShields (Jaden Brown kick), 11:31. Lobos 14–7. Drive: 10 plays, 83 yards, 3:23.
- TLU – Aaron Sotelo 13-yard pass from Seth Cosme (Joaquin Rodriguez kick), 9:44. Tied 14–14. Drive: 5 plays, 53 yards, 1:47.

Fourth quarter

- SRS – Vicente Luevano 53-yard pass from T. J. DeShields (Jaden Brown kick), 12:05. Lobos 21–14. Drive: 6 plays, 73 yards, 1:56.
- SRS – Ozias Wright 31-yard run (Jaden Brown kick), 1:28. Lobos 28–14. Drive: 6 plays, 55 yards, 3:40.

Statistics	SRS	TLU
First downs	20	17
Total yards	435	334
Rushing yards	56	138
Passing yards	379	196
Turnovers	0	1
Time of possession	31:09	28:51

Team	Category	Player	Statistics
Sul Ross	Passing	T. J. DeShields	27/41, 342 yards, 2 TD
Sul Ross	Rushing	Ozias Wright	10 rushes, 49 yards, TD
Sul Ross	Receiving	Vicente Luevano	6 receptions, 111 yards, 2 TD
Texas Lutheran	Passing	Seth Cosme	19/26, 196 yards, TD, INT
Texas Lutheran	Rushing	Jacob Forton	21 rushes, 76 yards, TD
Texas Lutheran	Receiving	Aaron Sotelo	5 receptions, 44 yards, TD

=== Howard Payne ===
Howard Payne Yellow Jackets at Sul Ross Lobos – Game summary

Quarter	1	2	3	4	Total
Yellow Jackets	21	14	14	7	56
Lobos	0	21	7	14	42

at Jackson Field, Alpine, Texas

- Date: October 1
- Game time: 1:00 p.m. CDT
- Game weather: Sunny, 75 °F (24 °C)
- Game attendance: 175
- Referee: Rex Rose
- Box score, Recap

Game information
First quarter
- HPU – Otis Lanier 64-yard pass from Landon McKinney (Harrison Pustilnik kick), 14:34. Yellow Jackets 7–0. Drive: 2 plays, 64 yards, 0:12.
- HPU – Samuel Sims 61-yard pass from Landon McKinney (Harrison Pustilnik kick), 7:35. Yellow Jackets 14–0. Drive: 5 plays, 88 yards, 2:13.
- HPU – Billy Reagins 1-yard run (Harrison Pustilnik kick), 1:52. Yellow Jackets 21–0. Drive: 12 plays, 63 yards, 4:50.

Second quarter

- HPU – Billy Reagins 4-yard run (Harrison Pustilnik kick), 12:28. Yellow Jackets 28–0. Drive: 6 plays, 31 yards, 3:42.
- SRS – Vicente Luevano 85-yard pass from Trent Graves (Jaden Brown kick), 10:03. Yellow Jackets 28–7. Drive: 1 play, 85 yards, 0:11.
- HPU – Jordan Carroll 4-yard pass from Landon McKinney (Harrison Pustilnik kick), 8:59. Yellow Jackets 35–7. Drive: 4 plays, 59 yards, 1:00.
- SRS – Trent Graves 1-yard pass from Vicente Luevano (Jaden Brown kick), 4:04. Yellow Jackers 35–14. Drive: 7 plays, 32 yards, 2:02.
- SRS – Travell Lumpkin 4-yard run (Jaden Brown kick), 1:10. Yellow Jackets 35–21. Drive: 10 plays, 68 yards, 1:28.

Third quarter

- HPU – Hunter Cheek 47-yard pass from Landon McKinney (Harrison Pustilnik kick), 10:43. Yellow Jackets 42–21. Drive: 4 plays, 58 yards, 1:19.
- SRS – Trent Graves 1-yard run (Jaden Brown kick), 8:50. Yellow Jackets 42–28. Drive: 8 plays, 71 yards, 1:44.
- HPU – Otis Lanier 21-yard pass from Landon McKinney (Harrison Pustilnik kick), 2:33. Yellow Jackets 49–28. Drive: 6 plays, 45 yards, 2:04.

Fourth quarter

- SRS – Travell Lumpkin 7-yard run (Jaden Brown kick), 14:56. Yellow Jackets 49–35. Drive: 9 plays, 71 yards, 2:37.
- SRS – Ozias Wright 57-yard run (Jaden Brown kick), 11:31. Yellow Jackets 49–42. Drive: 3 plays, 76 yards, 0:40.
- HPU – Otis Lanier 42-yard pass from Landon McKinney (Harrison Pustilnik kick), 0:37. Yellow Jackets 56–42. Drive: 7 plays, 90 yards, 3:16.

Statistics	HPU	SRS
First downs	30	28
Total yards	676	546
Rushing yards	266	233
Passing yards	410	313
Turnovers	1	2
Time of possession	24:27	35:33

Team	Category	Player	Statistics
Howard Payne	Passing	Landon McKinney	20/36, 407 yards, 6 TD, INT
Howard Payne	Rushing	Javian Myles	14 rushes, 97 yards
Howard Payne	Receiving	Otis Lanier	5 receptions, 159 yards, 3 TD
Sul Ross	Passing	Trent Graves	26/55, 312 yards, TD, INT
Sul Ross	Rushing	Ozias Wright	11 rushes, 123 yards, TD
Sul Ross	Receiving	Vicente Luevano	3 receptions, 107 yards, TD

=== At No. 10 Hardin–Simmons ===
Sul Ross Lobos at No. 10 Hardin–Simmons Cowboys – Game summary

Quarter	1	2	3	4	Total
Lobos	14	7	14	0	35
No. 10 Cowboys	14	28	7	21	70

at Shelton Stadium, Abilene, Texas

- Date: October 8
- Game time: 1:00 p.m. CDT
- Game weather: Cloudy, 82 °F (28 °C)
- Game attendance: 2,523
- Referee: Jason Hickey
- Box score, Recap

Game information
First quarter
- SRS – Jermius Johnson 4-yard run (Jaden Brown kick), 12:52. Lobos 7–0. Drive: 8 plays, 77 yards, 2:08.
- HSU – Colton Marshall 3-yard run (Grayson Bearden kick), 9:42. Tied 7–7. Drive: 8 plays, 51 yards, 3:10.
- HSU – Myles Featherston 10-yard run (Grayson Bearden kick), 4:18. Cowboys 14–7. Drive: 5 plays, 49 yards, 2:23.
- SRS – Austin Ogunmakin 1-yard run (Jaden Brown kick), 2:03. Tied 14–14. Drive: 8 plays, 75 yards, 2:15.

Second quarter

- SRS – Kendrick Jefferson 70-yard pass from Trent Graves (Jaden Brown kick), 12:48. Lobos 21–14. Drive: 6 plays, 91 yards, 2:02.
- HSU – Colton Marshall 4-yard run (Grayson Bearden kick), 11:14. Tied 21–21. Drive: 3 plays, 12 yards, 1:34.
- HSU – Gaylon Glynn 1-yard run (Grayson Bearden kick), 10:09. Cowboys 28–21. Drive: 3 plays, 15 yards, 1:02.
- HSU – Myles Featherston 22-yard run (Grayson Bearden kick), 8:21. Cowboys 35–21. Drive: 2 plays, 34 yards, 0:29.
- HSU – Gatlin Martin 29-yard pass from Gaylon Glynn (Grayson Bearden kick), 2:36. Cowboys 42–21. Drive: 5 plays, 72 yards, 1:37.

Third quarter

- HSU – Kolby Youngblood 9-yard run (Grayson Bearden kick), 7:47. Cowboys 49–21. Drive: 7 plays, 61 yards, 4:23.
- SRS – Austin Ogunmakin 28-yard pass from Andrew Martinez (Jaden Brown kick), 4:50. Cowboys 49–28. Drive: 7 plays, 71 yards, 2:50.
- SRS – Austin Ogunmakin 40-yard pass from Andrew Martinez (Jaden Brown kick), 3:37. Cowboys 49–35. Drive: 3 plays, 54 yards, 1:13.

Fourth quarter

- HSU – Colton Marshall 1-yard run (Grayson Bearden kick), 11:59. Cowboys 56–35. Drive: 5 plays, 47 yards, 1:37.
- HSU – Kevi Evans 36-yard pass from Gaylon Glynn (Grayson Bearden kick), 6:53. Cowboys 63–35. Drive: 5 plays, 54 yards, 2:44.
- HSU – Colton Marshall 15-yard run (Grayson Bearden kick), 2:59. Cowboys 70–35. Drive: 5 plays, 50 yards, 1:50.

Statistics	SRS	HSU
First downs	27	31
Total yards	545	533
Rushing yards	107	298
Passing yards	438	235
Turnovers	4	1
Time of possession	30:10	29:50

Team	Category	Player	Statistics
Sul Ross	Passing	Trent Graves	15/25, 251 yards, TD, INT
Sul Ross	Rushing	Jermius Johnson	14 rushes, 64 yards, TD
Sul Ross	Receiving	Austin Ogunmakin	11 receptions, 242 yards, 2 TD
Hardin–Simmons	Passing	Gaylon Glynn	17/21, 235 yards, 2 TD, INT
Hardin–Simmons	Rushing	Colton Marshall	15 rushes, 110 yards, 4 TD
Hardin–Simmons	Receiving	Kevi Evans	5 receptions, 94 yards, TD

=== At No. 4 Mary Hardin–Baylor ===
Sul Ross Lobos at No. 4 Mary Hardin–Baylor Crusaders – Game summary

Quarter	1	2	3	4	Total
Lobos	7	0	7	0	14
No. 4 Crusaders	10	21	7	7	45

at Crusader Stadium, Belton, Texas

- Date: October 22
- Game time: 1:00 p.m. CDT
- Game weather: Sunny
- Game attendance: 3,183
- Referee: Robert Newton
- Box score, Recap

Game information
First quarter
- CRU – Anthony Avila 20-yard field goal, 13:10. Crusaders 3–0. Drive: 6 plays, 20 yards, 1:41.
- CRU – Brandon Jordan 17-yard pass from Kyle King (Anthony Avila kick), 8:00. Crusaders 10–0. Drive: 8 plays, 83 yards, 2:23.
- SRS – Travell Lumpkin 1-yard run (Jaden Brown kick), 0:31. Crusaders 10–7. Drive: 9 plays, 61 yards, 3:11.

Second quarter

- CRU – Aphonso Thomas 15-yard run (Anthony Avila kick), 13:54. Crusaders 17–7. Drive: 5 plays, 55 yards, 1:36.
- CRU – Jerry Day 57-yard pass from Kyle King (Anthony Avila kick), 8:18. Crusaders 24–7. Drive: 8 plays, 99 yards, 3:19.
- CRU – Brandon Jordan 4-yard pass from Kyle King (Anthony Avila kick), 2:10. Crusaders 31–7. Drive: 6 plays, 71 yards, 2:35.

Third quarter

- CRU – Jerry Day 8-yard pass from Kyle King (Anthony Avila kick), 10:55. Crusaders 38–7. Drive: 6 plays, 66 yards, 1:33.
- SRS – Eddie Sinegal 40-yard pass from Trent Graves (Jaden Brown kick), 0:45. Crusaders 38–14. Drive: 4 plays, 51 yards, 1:51.

Fourth quarter

- CRU – Montana Miller 5-yard run (Anthony Avila kick), 4:04. Crusaders 45–14. Drive: 6 plays, 71 yards, 2:24.

Statistics	SRS	CRU
First downs	20	28
Total yards	308	552
Rushing yards	57	302
Passing yards	251	250
Turnovers	3	2
Time of possession	31:50	28:10

Team	Category	Player	Statistics
Sul Ross	Passing	Trent Graves	22/33, 236 yards, TD, INT
Sul Ross	Rushing	Kendrick Jefferson	12 rushes, 32 yards
Sul Ross	Receiving	Austin Ogunmakin	3 receptions, 71 yards
Mary Hardin–Baylor	Passing	Kyle King	19/31, 250 yards, 4 TD, 2 INT
Mary Hardin–Baylor	Rushing	Aphonso Thomas	13 rushes, 121 yards, TD
Mary Hardin–Baylor	Receiving	Jerry Day	7 receptions, 150 yards, 2 TD

=== McMurry ===
McMurry War Hawks at Sul Ross Lobos – Game summary

Quarter	1	2	3	4	Total
War Hawks	7	7	13	0	27
Lobos	7	5	14	7	33

at Jackson Field, Alpine, Texas

- Date: October 29
- Game time: 1:00 p.m. CDT
- Game weather: Sunny, 56 °F (13 °C)
- Game attendance: 165
- Referee: Esrael Silva
- Box score, Recap

Game information
First quarter
- SRS – Vicente Luevano 7-yard pass from Korbin Covarrubiaz (Elijah Medina kick), 7:01. Lobos 7–0. Drive: 9 plays, 70 yards, 5:10.
- MCM – Jermond Lovely 47-yard pass from Andrew McBride (Jared Mendoza kick), 4:03. Tied 7–7. Drive: 8 plays, 89 yards, 2:54.

Second quarter

- MCM – Drew Hagler 1-yard run (Jared Mendoza kick), 8:05. War Hawks 14–7. Drive: 20 plays, 68 yards, 8:03.
- SRS – Andy Flores blocked punt out of end zone, 4:37. War Hawks 14–9.
- SRS – Elijah Medina 23-yard field goal, 1:33. War Hawks 14–12. Drive: 6 plays, 18 yards, 2:12.

Third quarter

- SRS – Ozias Wright 22-yard run (Elijah Medina kick), 14:30. Lobos 19–14. Drive: 2 plays, 29 yards, 0:17.
- MCM – Andrew McBride 5-yard run (pass failed), 11:46. War Hawks 20–19. Drive: 4 plays, 20 yards, 1:21.
- SRS – Gus Charles 22-yard pass from Korbin Covarrubiaz (Elijah Medina kick), 7:46. Lobos 26–20. Drive: 12 plays, 85 yards, 2:59.
- MCM – Kyle Canada 34-yard pass from Andrew McBride (Jared Mendoza kick), 3:21. War Hawks 27–26. Drive: 5 plays, 79 yards, 2:24.

Fourth quarter

- SRS – Austin Ogunmakin 10-yard pass from Korbin Covarrubiaz (Elijah Medina kick), 0:28. Lobos 33–27. Drive: 7 plays, 60 yards, 1:49.

Statistics	MCM	SRS
First downs	17	28
Total yards	277	439
Rushing yards	77	87
Passing yards	200	352
Turnovers	2	3
Time of possession	25:59	34:01

Team	Category	Player	Statistics
McMurry	Passing	Andrew McBride	18/33, 200 yards, 2 TD, INT
McMurry	Rushing	Dee Robinson	8 rushes, 27 yards
McMurry	Receiving	Jermond Lovely	2 receptions, 60 yards, TD
Sul Ross	Passing	Korbin Covarrubiaz	23/31, 269 yards, 3 TD
Sul Ross	Rushing	Ozias Wright	7 rushes, 41 yards, TD
Sul Ross	Receiving	Gus Charles	6 receptions, 88 yards, TD

=== At East Texas Baptist ===
Sul Ross Lobos at East Texas Baptist Tigers – Game summary

Quarter	1	2	3	4	Total
Lobos	0	0	0	14	14
Tigers	3	7	7	7	24

at Ornelas Stadium, Marshall, Texas

- Date: November 5
- Game time: 1:00 p.m. CDT
- Game weather: Sunny, 53 °F (12 °C)
- Game attendance: 1,013
- Referee: Joshua Bannerman
- Box score, Recap

Game information
First quarter
- ETX – Christian Piazza 25-yard field goal, 2:13. Tigers 3–0. Drive: 9 plays, 51 yards, 3:47.

Second quarter

- ETX – Terrance Terrell 21-yard pass from Cornelius Banks (Christian Piazza kick), 14:32. Tigers 10–0. Drive: 4 plays, 67 yards, 0:59.

Third quarter

- ETX – Cornelius Banks 10-yard run (Christian Piazza kick), 6:48. Tigers 17–0. Drive: 11 plays, 65 yards, 6:29.

Fourth quarter

- SRS – Korbin Covarrubiaz 5-yard run (Jaden Brown kick), 11:38. Tigers 17–7. Drive: 5 plays, 16 yards, 1:42.
- SRS – James Parker 14-yard interception return (Jaden Brown kick), 6:38. Tigers 17–14.

Statistics	SRS	ETX
First downs	18	18
Total yards	230	330
Rushing yards	143	230
Passing yards	87	100
Turnovers	4	2
Time of possession	22:21	37:39

Team	Category	Player	Statistics
Sul Ross	Passing	Korbin Covarrubiaz	13/37, 87 yards, 4 INT
Sul Ross	Rushing	Korbin Covarrubiaz	12 rushes, 67 yards, TD
Sul Ross	Receiving	Vicente Luevano	5 receptions, 31 yards
East Texas Baptist	Passing	Cornelius Banks	8/18, 100 yards, TD, INT
East Texas Baptist	Rushing	Melek Hamilton	30 rushes, 133 yards
East Texas Baptist	Receiving	Kaleb O'Bryant	3 receptions, 35 yards

=== Southwestern (TX) ===
Southwestern Pirates at Sul Ross Lobos – Game summary

Quarter	1	2	3	4	Total
Pirates	0	13	7	21	41
Lobos	10	7	14	13	44

at Jackson Field, Alpine, Texas

- Date: November 12
- Game time: 1:00 p.m. CST
- Game weather: Sunny, 51 °F (11 °C)
- Game attendance: 200
- Referee: Rex Rose
- Box score, Recap

Game information
First quarter
- SRS – Elijah Medina 25-yard field goal, 13:09. Lobos 3–0. Drive: 4 plays, -3 yards, 1:12.
- SRS – Austin Ogunmakin 26-yard pass from Korbin Covarrubiaz (Jaden Brown kick), 7:36. Lobos 10–0. Drive: 5 plays, 76 yards, 1:29.

Second quarter

- SWU – Damian Gomez 1-yard run (Charlie Fournier kick), 14:56. Lobos 10–7. Drive: 14 plays, 65 yards, 7:40.
- SWU – Charlie Fournier 31-yard field goal, 7:41. Tied 10–10. Drive: 9 plays, 30 yards, 5:17.
- SRS – Austin Ogunmakin 17-yard pass from Korbin Covarrubiaz (Jaden Brown kick), 1:19. Lobos 17–10. Drive: 2 plays, 55 yards, 0:27.
- SWU – Charlie Fournier 43-yard field goal, 0:00. Lobos 17–13. Drive: 7 plays, 41 yards, 1:03.

Third quarter

- SRS – Ozias Wright 2-yard run (Jaden Brown kick), 12:29. Lobos 24–13. Drive: 7 plays, 75 yards, 2:31.
- SWU – Landry Gilpin 3-yard run (Charlie Fournier kick), 9:46. Lobos 24–20. Drive: 6 plays, 52 yards, 2:34.
- SRS – Korbin Covarrubiaz 46-yard run (Jaden Brown kick), 0:00. Lobos 31–20. Drive: 7 plays, 68 yards, 2:14.

Fourth quarter

- SRS – Vicente Luevano 9-yard pass from Korbin Covarrubiaz (Jaden Brown kick), 7:28. Lobos 38–20. Drive: 8 plays, 84 yards, 3:07.
- SWU – Jojo Wilson 27-yard pass from Landry Gilpin (Christian Reeves run), 6:11. Lobos 38–28. Drive: 4 plays, 63 yards, 1:17.
- SRS – Vicente Luevano 38-yard pass from Korbin Covarrubiaz (pass failed), 5:58. Lobos 44–28. Drive: 2 plays, 45 yards, 0:13.
- SWU – Mitchell Garrett 43-yard pass from Landry Gilpin (pass failed), 5:47. Lobos 44–34. Drive: 1 play, 43 yards, 0:11.
- SWU – Dugan Sexton 25-yard pass from Landry Gilpin (Charlie Fournier kick), 1:50. Lobos 44–41. Drive: 7 plays, 80 yards, 1:48.

Statistics	SWU	SRS
First downs	27	25
Total yards	482	469
Rushing yards	126	132
Passing yards	356	337
Turnovers	5	1
Time of possession	33:20	26:40

Team	Category	Player	Statistics
Southwestern	Passing	Landry Gilpin	9/15, 183 yards, 3 TD, INT
Southwestern	Rushing	Christian Reeves	14 rushes, 76 yards
Southwestern	Receiving	Mitchell Garrett	4 receptions, 110 yards, TD
Sul Ross	Passing	Korbin Covarrubiaz	23/37, 337 yards, 4 TD, INT
Sul Ross	Rushing	Ozias Wright	16 rushes, 70 yards, TD
Sul Ross	Receiving	Vicente Luevano	7 receptions, 153 yards, 2 TD

== Roster ==
2022 Sul Ross Lobos football team roster
Players
Coaches
Offense

Pos.	#	Name	Class
WR	1	Liam Wayne Onyon	Fr
WR	2	Devonte McDonald	Fr
RB	3	Ozias Wright	Jr
WR	5	Ahmonte Kendrick	Fr
WR	6	Vicente Luevano	So
QB	7	Zezar Tovar	Fr
WR, RB	8	Kendrick Jefferson	Jr
WR	10	Quinton Lee	Jr
TE	11	Isaiah Villarreal	Sr
QB	12	T. J. DeShields	Jr
WR	13	Gus Charles	So
WR	14	Jackson Carroll	Fr
QB	15	Joshua Ochoa	So
QB	15	Chris Palomo	So
QB	16	Andrew Martinez	Fr
QB	17	Trent Graves	So
WR	18	Christopher Gisewhite	Fr
WR	18	Austin Ogunmakin	So
WR	19	Brian Mahaffey	Fr
WR	21	Eddie Sinegal	Sr
RB	23	Tylen Charles	Fr
WR	23	Dre'Chan Moody	Sr
RB	29	Jermius Johnson	Fr
RB	30	Travell Lumpkin	Jr
RB	34	Daniel Cantu	Fr
QB	39	Korbin Covarrubiaz	Fr
TE	41	Maurice Alcorn	Fr
RB	45	Dijon James	Fr
RB	46	Elijah Uribe	Fr
OL	50	Daniel Garcia	Fr
OL	52	Kellen Garner	So
OL	55	Ajani Batts	So
OL	57	Dawson Tello	Fr
OL	60	Maximilliano Alvarado	So
OL	62	Anthony Lemon	Fr
OL	64	Xavier Garcia	So
OL	65	Shareek Stanislaus	Fr
OL	66	Andres Rivera	Fr
OL	67	Joe Sims	Fr
OL	68	Xavier Rivas	Fr
OL	69	Joshua Munoz	Jr
OL	71	Marcellus Wright	Fr
OL	73	Emmanuel Mattix	Sr
OL	75	Tim Hines	Sr
OL	75	Andre Alfaro	Fr
OL	76	Jose Calderon	Sr
OL	78	Cedarrion Crooks	So
OL	79	Matthew Langford	Fr
WR	80	Britt McKinney	Fr
WR	80	Isaiah Pena	Fr
TE	81	Micah Collins	Fr
WR	82	Kawasaki Latham	Fr
TE	83	Hayden Mullins	Fr
WR	83	Braeden Robles	So
TE	84	Jermaine Bernal	Fr
WR	85	Darion Barnes	Fr
WR	85	Elijah Gonzalez	Fr
WR, RB	86	Marcos De La Cruz	Fr
TE	86	Ryan Smith	Fr
WR	86	Tyler Smith	So
TE	87	Ranley Krueger	Fr
WR	87	Ethan Sanchez	Fr
WR	88	Wyatt Nelson	Fr
TE	89	Justin Moon	Fr
TE	89	Roman Salcido	Fr

Defense

Pos.	#	Name	Class
DB	1	James Parker	Sr
DB	2	Quincy Blair	So
LB	4	Hunter Bunch	Jr
LB	6	Javeon Moss	Sr
DB	9	Jaylen Bussey	Sr
DB	10	Caleb Montes	Fr
DB	14	Xavier Minjarez	Jr
DB	19	Brendon Martin	Fr
DB	20	Alec Garcia	So
LB	21	Tymadre Ross	Fr
LB	22	Jade Rios	Jr
DB	24	Elijah Gomez	Jr
DB	25	Hunter Rayson	Fr
DB	26	Brandon Finger	Jr
DB	27	Jakolby King	Fr
DB	28	Jaylon Lane	Sr
DB	28	Jakori Wilson	Fr
DB	29	Aiden Montes	So
DB	30	Malachi Robinson	Fr
LB	31	Ronin Williams	Sr
DB	32	Toborice Walter	Fr
LB	34	Leonard Davis	Fr
LB	36	Kolter Henderson	Fr
DL	37	Xavier Bostic	Fr
LB	37	Elias Minjarez	Fr
LB	38	Humberto Garcia	Fr
DB	39	Isaiah Shelby	Fr
DL	40	Aron Olague	Fr
DB	41	Bobby Cantu	So
LB	42	Tyson Brown	Sr
DB	43	Kadron Morris	Fr
DL	44	Jon'tay Wise	Fr
DB	46	Humberto Moreno	Fr
LB	46	Micah Sanders	Fr
LB	47	Tyshawn Thomas	Fr
DE	48	Emmanuel Gonzales	Fr
LB	48	Julian Moya	Fr
LB	49	Nathan Castillo	Fr
LB	50	Adrian Rivera	Fr
LB	53	JaMarcus Savage	Fr
DL	54	Jayden Floyd	So
DL	55	Ajani Batts	So
LB	56	Dalton Bills	So
LB	58	Travis Owen	So
DL	61	Dominique Fierro	Fr
DL	63	Trebor Acuna	Fr
DL	69	Caleb Comly	Fr
NG	77	Jacob Morales	Fr
DL	90	Dayln Dunbar	Jr
DL	92	Ta'bias Jackson	Fr
DL	93	Maurice Taylor	Jr
DL	94	Willie Johnson	So
DL	95	Ola Fakailoatonga	Fr
DL	98	Drake Womack	Fr
DL	99	Rodrigo Rivera	Sr

Special teams

Pos.	#	Name	Class
P	33	Manuel Osorio	Fr
K, P	34	Chris Ruiz	Fr
LS	35	Caleb Smith	So
K	38	Jaden Brown	Sr
LS	51	Sean Street	Fr
LS	86	Ryan Smith	Fr
K	96	Elijah Medina	Fr
K	97	Oswaldo Luna	Jr

Head coach

- Barry Derickson
  Head coach/Offensive coordinator

Coordinators/assistant coaches

- Eric Eisenberg
  Defensive coordinator
- Keafer Clegg
  Co-defensive coordinator/Defensive line
- Billy Jack Ray
  Running backs
- Caden Fregia
  Linebackers
- Fowler Freund
  Wide receivers
- James White
  Tight ends
- Robert Cervantes
  Offensive line

Legend

- (C) Team captain
- (S) Suspended
- (I) Ineligible
- Injured
- Redshirt

Roster
Last update: August 16, 2024
