= Randall Carroll =

American football player (born 1991)

No. 1
- Position: Wide receiver

Personal information
- Born: April 13, 1991 (age 35); Irvine, California, U.S.
- Listed height: 5 ft 10 in (1.78 m)
- Listed weight: 180 lb (82 kg)

Career information
- High school: Los Angeles (CA) Cathedral
- College: Sul Ross State
- NFL draft: 2014: undrafted

Career history
- Seattle Seahawks (2014)*
- * Offseason or practice squad member only

Randall Carroll (born April 13, 1991) is an American former professional football wide receiver and defensive back. He attended the University of California, Los Angeles, having played for the UCLA Bruins from 2009 to 2011, but being dismissed for academic reasons.

== Early life ==
Carroll attended Cathedral High School in Los Angeles, California, where he played running back, cornerback and wide receiver. In his senior year, he totaled 31 catches for 564 yards and four touchdowns, and also carried the ball 73 times for 543 rushing yards and two scores. He was a first-team selection on the 2008 USA Today All-USA team.

=== Track and field ===
Also an excellent track athlete, Carroll ran a 10.30 non-wind-aided clocking in the 100 metres at the Del Rey League finals in May 2009. It was the fastest by an American high school sprinter in 2009, and tied Quincy Watts and Riley Washington for the third fastest ever by a California high schooler, behind only Henry Thomas and Ricky Carrigan. In June 2009, he won the CIF state track titles in the 100 (10.38) and 200 (21.08) for the second consecutive year, becoming the first athlete to do so since Charlie Paddock in 1917 and 1918. His achievements earned him a 2009 All-USA track and field team selection by USA Today as well.

==== Personal bests ====
Event	Time (seconds)	Venue	Date
60 meters	6.82	Seattle, Washington	February 26, 2010
100 meters	10.30	Garden City, Kansas	May 7, 2009
200 meters	20.64	Cerritos, California	May 31, 2008

== College career ==
Carroll's career at UCLA was filled with turmoil. He was among four players suspended for a game in 2009 for a violation of team rules and caused a stir later that year with a Twitter message disparaging then-offensive coordinator Norm Chow. In 2011, he was among six UCLA players suspended after participating in a benches-clearing brawl October 20 against Arizona. In January 2012, Carroll was dismissed for failing to meet academic requirements. Carroll transferred to Sul Ross State University, where he played his final year of college football.

== Professional career ==
=== Seattle Seahawks ===
Carroll signed with the Seattle Seahawks after going unselected in the 2014 NFL draft. The Seahawks released him on August 1, 2014.
