= General Gregory =

General Gregory may refer to:

- Andrew Gregory (British Army officer) (born 1957), British Army lieutenant general
- Charles Levinge Gregory (1870–1944), British Indian Army major general
- Edmund B. Gregory (1882–1961), U.S. Army lieutenant general
- Isaac Gregory (c. 1737–1800), North Carolina Militia brigadier general in the American Revolutionary War
- Jack I. Gregory (born 1931), U.S. Air Force general
- Maurice C. Gregory (1881–1949), U.S. Marine Corps brigadier general
- Sandra A. Gregory (fl. 1970s–2000s), U.S. Air Force brigadier general

== See also ==
- Matthew Gregory (attorney) (born 1968), Attorney General of the Northern Mariana Islands
- Thomas Watt Gregory (1861–1933), United States Attorney General
