= Kern Wildenthal =

American academic

- Born: San Marcos, Texas, U.S.
- Education: UT Southwestern, MD University of Cambridge, PhD
- Known for: Former President, UT Southwestern President, Children's Medical Center Foundation
- Website: www.kernwildenthal.com

Kern Wildenthal is an American academic and president of the Children's Medical Center Foundation in Dallas, Texas. He also holds honorary appointments as President Emeritus and Professor of Medicine Emeritus at University of Texas Southwestern Medical Center, where he served as president from 1986 to 2008. He received his medical degree from UT Southwestern in 1964 and a Ph.D. from the University of Cambridge in 1970.

== Early life and education ==
Wildenthal was born in San Marcos, Texas. He completed his undergraduate studies at Sul Ross State University and received a B.A. in English Literature. He received his medical degree from UT Southwestern in 1964. Wildenthal then was an intern at Bellevue Hospital Center in NYC and completed an internal medicine residency and postdoctoral fellowship in cardiology at UT Southwestern. In 1970, he received a Ph.D. in cell physiology from the University of Cambridge in England.

== Early career ==
Wildenthal then returned to UT Southwestern as an assistant professor of internal medicine and physiology. In 1971, he was promoted to associate professor with tenure and, two years later, he was elected to the American Society for Clinical Investigation for his research on cardiac function. In 1975, he received a Guggenheim Fellowship and spent a year doing further research at Cambridge. Upon return, he was promoted to Dean of the Graduate School at UT Southwestern. During that time, he received international attention for discovering a novel way to treat paroxysmal atrial tachycardia in patients with runaway heartbeats.

In 1980, Wildenthal was promoted to Dean of the Medical School at UT Southwestern. He was 38 years old at the time and became the youngest Dean of any American Medical School. Six years later, he was promoted to President of UT Southwestern.

== UT Southwestern ==
Wildenthal was the president of the University of Texas Southwestern Medical Center from 1986 until his retirement in 2008. Between 1986 and 2008, the center became one of the leading academic medical centers in the world. Total institutional operating funding grew from $184 million to $1.453 billion, and research expenditures from $56 million in 1986 to $398 million. Seven new research buildings, six outpatient clinical facilities, and two hospitals were added to the campus. A staff that included 4 Nobel Prize winning faculty members and 17 National Academy of the Sciences members was recruited during that time. During his tenure, the Center received three gifts of greater than $100 million and donations for more than 200 endowed chairs. The endowment grew from $40 million to over $1.3 billion.

== Children's Medical Center Foundation ==
On May 28, 2013, Wildenthal was appointed president of the Children's Medical Center Foundation and executive vice president of Children's Medical Center in Dallas.

== Community involvement and current activities ==
Wildenthal and his wife have collectively held key roles in the Dallas Opera, Dallas Symphony Orchestra, Dallas Museum of Art, Dallas Business Committee for the Arts, Greater Dallas Chamber of Commerce, Dallas Citizens Council, Dallas Assembly, Vickery Meadow Learning Center, Friends of WRR, Science Place, and Dallas Center for the Performing Arts.

Wildenthal's current business activities include a position as the Senior Consultant for Southwestern Medical Foundation, after serving from 2008 to 2012 as its CEO. He consults for several foundations, research institutes, and biotech companies, including the Gladstone Research Institute in San Francisco and ScienceSeed in Dallas. He serves on the board of directors of Kronos Worldwide, Inc, as well as on the boards of a number of non-profit organizations, including the Hoblitzelle Foundation, Moncrief Cancer Institute, and Southwestern Medical Foundation. Wildenthal is an Honorary Fellow of Hughes Hall at the University of Cambridge, and serves on the board of Cambridge in America.

In 2006, Wildenthal and his wife, Marnie, received the Virginia Chandler Dykes Leadership Award, presented by Texas Woman's University, for their commitment to improving the quality of life in Dallas. Wildenthal was also recognized by the Texas Senate 81st Legislature with Resolution No. 565 commending him for longtime commitment to the University of Texas Southwestern Medical Center.
