= Don Bingham =

American football player (1929–1997)

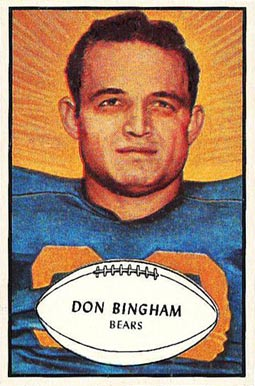
- Bingham on a 1953 Bowman football card

No. 46
- Positions: Halfback, return specialist

Personal information
- Born: November 7, 1929; Shattuck, Oklahoma, U.S.
- Died: July 17, 1997 (aged 67); Fannin County, Texas, U.S.
- Listed height: 6 ft 0 in (1.83 m)
- Listed weight: 185 lb (84 kg)

Career information
- High school: Odessa (Odessa, Texas)
- College: Sul Ross
- NFL draft: 1953: 7th round, 78th overall pick

Career history
- Chicago Bears (1956)

Career NFL statistics
- Rushing yards: 36
- Rushing average: 5.1
- Return yards: 451
- Total touchdowns: 1
- Stats at Pro Football Reference

Donald Dean Bingham (November 7, 1929 – July 17, 1997) was an American professional football halfback and return specialist who played one season with the Chicago Bears of the National Football League (NFL). He played college football at Sul Ross State College.

== Early life ==
Donald Dean Bingham was born on November 7, 1929, in Shattuck, Oklahoma. He attended Odessa High School in Odessa, Texas.

== College career ==
Bingham played college football for the Sul Ross Lobos of Sul Ross State College. He was team captain during his senior year in 1952. He was also a letterman in track. He was invited to the 1948 United States Olympic trials as a sprinter. Bingham was a member of Kappa Delta Pi and Phi Beta Kappa. He was inducted into the Sul Ross Hall of Honor in 1989.

== Professional career ==
Bingham was selected by the Bears in the seventh round, with the 79th overall pick, of the 1953 NFL draft. He signed with the team on March 11, 1953, but did not play for them until 1956 due to military obligations. In 1954 and 1955, while a member of the United States Marine Corps, he played for the Marine Corps Base Camp Lejeune football team. After his military service ended, he signed with the Bears again on April 14, 1956. In his lone season in the NFL, he recorded 36 rushing yards on seven carries and 444 kick return yards; against the Los Angeles Rams, he scored on a 100-yard kickoff return to start the second half, giving the Bears a 17–0 lead. The Bears went on to win 30–21.

== Personal life ==
Bingham died on July 17, 1997, in Fannin County, Texas.
