= Sul Ross State Lobos =

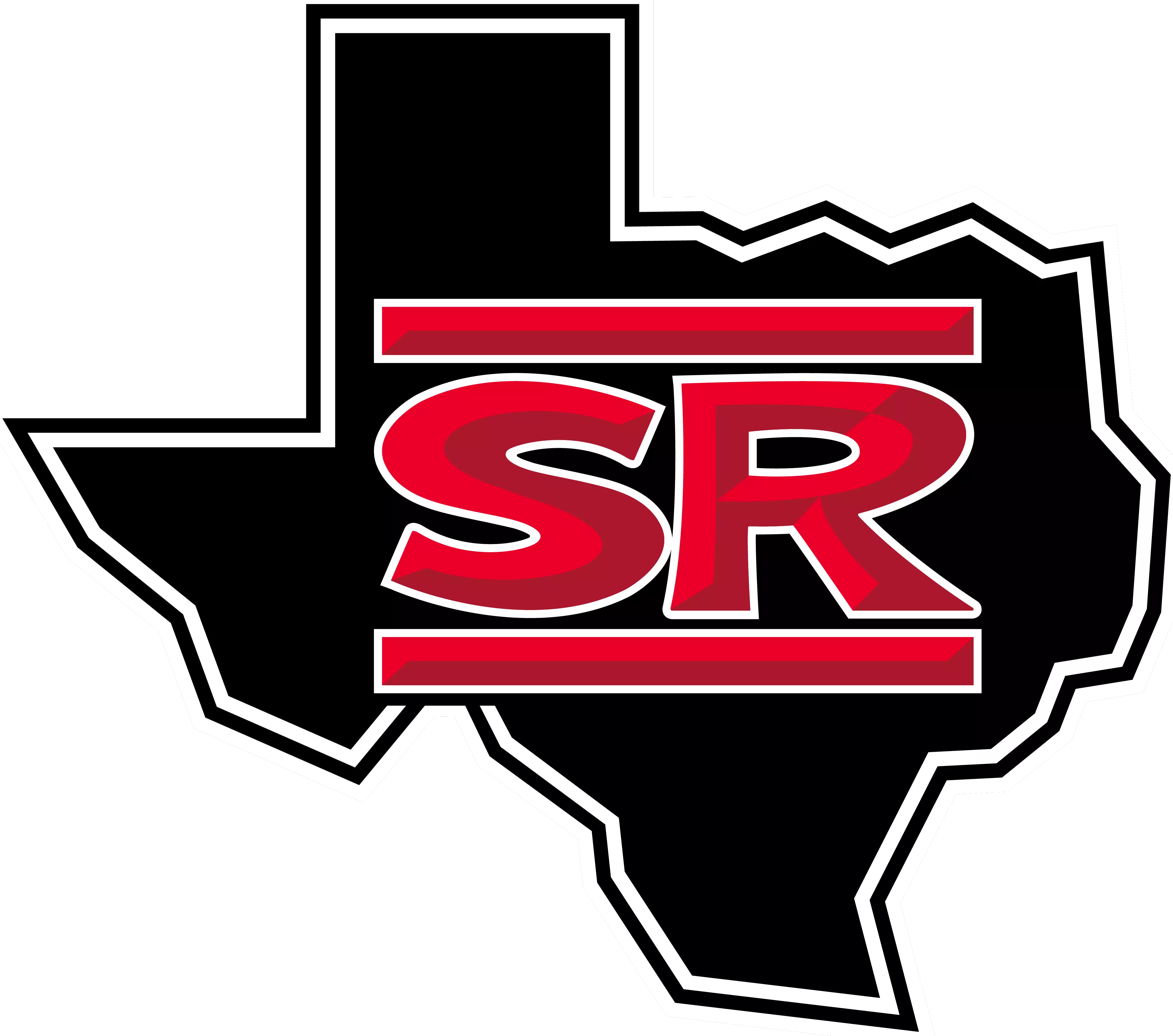
- University: Sul Ross State University
- Nickname: Lobos
- NCAA: Division II
- Conference: Lone Star Conference
- Athletic director: Amanda Workman
- Location: Alpine, Texas
- Varsity teams: 14 varsity teams, NIRA rodeo
- Football stadium: Jackson Field
- Basketball arena: Pete P. Gallego Center
- Baseball stadium: Kokernot Field
- Other venues: Graves-Pierce Recreational Complex
- Colors: Red and Grey
- Mascot: Sully
- Website: srlobos.com
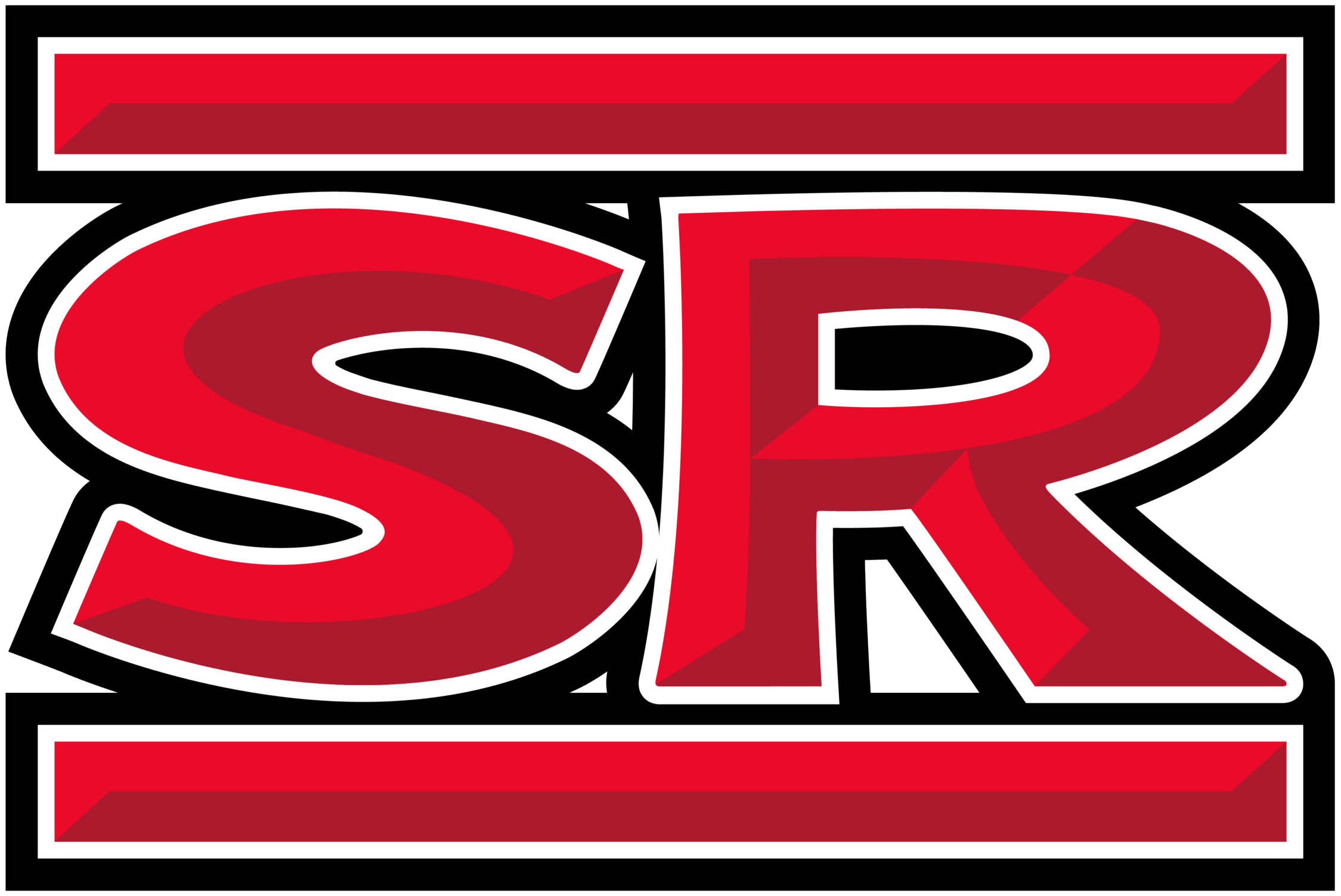

The Sul Ross State University Lobos are the athletic teams of Sul Ross State University, a public university in Alpine, Texas. They compete in the Division II level of the National Collegiate Athletic Association (NCAA) in the Lone Star Conference.

Sul Ross State competes in 12 intercollegiate varsity sports. Men's sports include baseball, basketball, cross country, football, soccer and tennis; while women's sports include basketball, cross country, soccer, softball, tennis and volleyball.

In July 2023, Lobos athletic programs were approved for reclassification to Division II. On July 1, 2024, the university became a member of the Lone Star Conference.

== Volleyball ==
In 1970 and 1971, the women's volleyball team won the first two Association for Intercollegiate Athletics for Women Volleyball National Championships. The AIAW governed women's sports prior to NCAA recognition. Sul Ross State defeated UCLA and Long Beach State, respectively, in the championship matches. In addition, Sul Ross won Texas Intercollegiate Athletic Association Conference Championship in 1976, 1977, 1979, 1980, 1981, 1982, 1984, 1985, 1986, and 1991.

== Football ==
In 2007, it was announced that 59-year-old Mike Flynt would be joining the Sul Ross football team. He had played college football when he was originally enrolled in college and his athletic eligibility had not expired.

In 2015, the team finished 3–7. The following season, 2016, the Lobos finished with a record of 6–4, the program's first winning record in a decade.

The Lobos were led by head coach Barry Derickson. They are now led by Lee Hayes. Derickson, who was originally hired as the offensive coordinator prior to the 2021 season, was announced as the program's interim head coach on November 30, 2021, following the resignation of John Pearce. Following the conclusion of the 2022 season, Derickson was promoted to full-time head coach.

=== Jackson Field ===
Jackson Field
- Location: 204 S. Cockrell St; Alpine, TX 79380
- Capacity: 3,000
- Surface: FieldTurf

Construction
- Groundbreaking: 1924
- Opened: 1924

Jackson Field is a football stadium located in Alpine, Texas with a seating capacity of 3,000. The stadium is the home field for the Sul Ross Lobos and Alpine High School Fighting Bucks. The stadium was constructed and opened in 1924 and is named after Big Bend rancher J. D. Jackson who donated the land for the stadium. The old playing surface, natural grass, was replaced with a new artificial turf surface in 2016 as part of a larger project that included the construction of a multi-purpose recreational/intramural field just east of Jackson Field, with the funding coming from private donations and gifts.

=== Rivalries ===
==== McMurry ====
The Battle of I-20 is the name given to the McMurry–Sul Ross football rivalry. Going into the 2019 match-up McMurry led the all-time series 46–40–2; the Lobos would win that year's game 21–7. As of the 2023 season, the two teams have met 93 times with McMurry leading the series 48–43–2. The future of the rivalry remains uncertain as Sul Ross joined the Lone Star Conference in 2024, which competes at the Division II level, while McMurry competes in the Division III Southern Collegiate Athletic Conference.

==== Western New Mexico ====
In 2024, a new trophy series was introduced for the Lobos' games against the Western New Mexico Mustangs, dubbed the Battle for the Golden Tumbleweed, with the winner receiving the Golden Tumbleweed Trophy. The teams first met in 1949, with the Mustangs leading the overall series 15–7 entering the 2024 match-up. Sul Ross won the inaugural trophy game, 30–14, on October 19, 2024; this victory also marked the Lobos' first win since rejoining the LSC and first win over an NCAA Division II opponent.

=== Conference affiliations ===
- Independent, 1923–1927
- Texas Intercollegiate Athletic Association (TIAA), 1928–1929
- Independent, 1930
- TIAA, 1931–1932
- Independent, 1933–1935
- Alamo Conference, 1936–1939

Co-champion: 1936

- No teams fielded, 1940–1945 during World War II
- New Mexico Intercollegiate Conference, 1946–1949

Champions: 1947, 1948, and 1949
As a member of the NMIC, Sul Ross never lost a conference game including during its initial, probationary 1946 season when the team did not play a complete conference schedule and was ineligible for a league title.

- Lone Star Conference, 1950–1975

Champions: 1950 and 1965
1951 Aztec Bowl Champion defeating ONEFA All-Stars 41–40
1964 All-Sports Bowl Champion defeating East Central State 21–13
1965 NAIA Div. I playoff loss to Linfield College, 27–30

- TIAA, 1976–1995

Champion: 1982 (undefeated regular season)
Co-champions: 1981, 1983, and 1985
1982 NAIA Div. II playoff loss to William Jewell, 43–44

- American Southwest Conference, 1996–2023

Co-champion: 1996

- Lone Star Conference, 2024–present

== Baseball ==
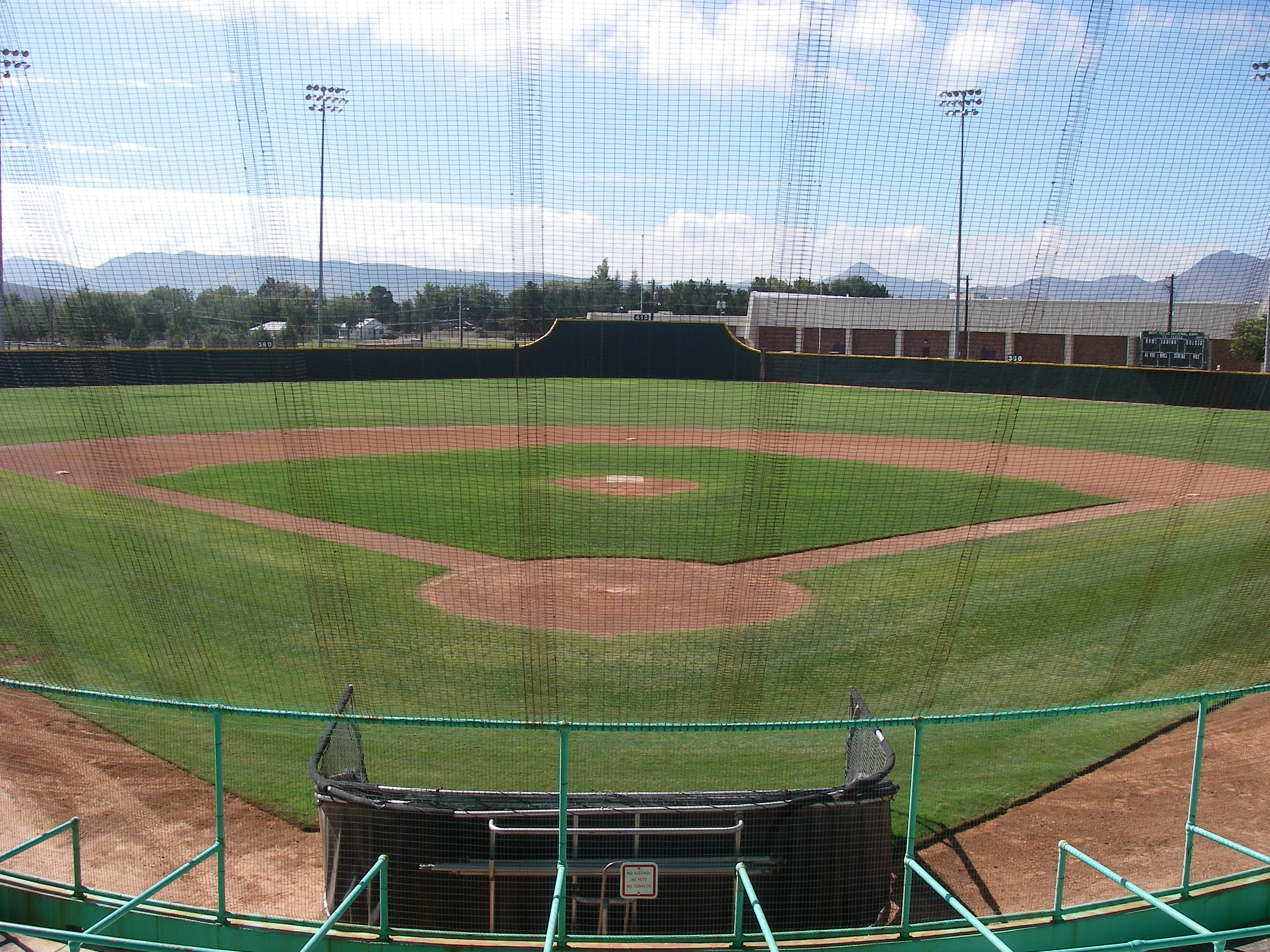
Kokernot Field in 2008

- NAIA World Series Champion – 1957
- TIAA Champions- 1988, 1990, 1996
- ASC Champion – 1999

The Lobos home park, Kokernot Field, was the host for the first ever NAIA Baseball World Series. Texas Monthly called Kokernot Field the Yankee Stadium of Texas.

== Men's basketball championships ==
- ASC Western Division – 2003, 2004, 2005, and 2018
- ASC Tournament – 2004
- NCAA D-III Sweet 16 – 2004

== Women's basketball championships ==
- ASC – 1987, 1992 and 1995

== Tennis championships ==
- Men's TIAA – 1980, 1981, 1982, 1983, 1985, and 1988
- Women's TIAA – 1980, 1981, 1982, 1983. 1985, 1988, and 1992

== Track and field championships ==
- Men's LSC – 1971
- Frank Krhut – LSC Coach of the Year 1971
- Women's TIAA – 1980

== Cross country ==
- Men – the Lobos best ASC Conference Meet finish was fifth place in 2008.
- Women – the Lady Lobos placed fifth at the ASC Conference Meet in 2004, 2005 and 2006.

== Softball ==
Sul Ross began playing softball in 1996.

== Women's soccer ==
Sul Ross State University hired Marquis Muse in July 2015 as its first Head Women's Soccer Coach. The Lobos finished 2–8 in conference play and 3–13 overall in its inaugural season.

== Men's golf ==
Sul Ross captured the 1985 TIAA Golf Championship by 80 strokes. 1st Team All Conference\Medalist Blake Moody(Ozona, TX), 1st Team All Conference Daniel Nunez(Alpine, TX) and Kevin Farrer(Alpine, TX), 2nd Team All Conference Ronnie Martinez(Marfa, TX) and Kevin Burnett(Pecos, TX), but has subsequently dropped the program.

== Intercollegiate rodeo ==
Sul Ross was a founding member of the National Intercollegiate Rodeo Association and has a long and successful history with seven national titles, placing in the top 10 at the College National Finals Rodeo 33 times, and having six all-around cowboys and cowgirls.

- Men's NIRA Titles – 1949, 1950, 1951, 1962, 1982, and 1983
- Women's NIRA Title – 1985
- All-Around Cowboys – Harley May 1949 and 1950, Tex Martin 1953, and Cody Lambert 1982
- All-Around Cowgirls – Donna Jean Saul 1962

== Notable athletes and coaches ==
- Paul Pierce (1914–2004) – He participated in football and basketball, and graduated in 1938 with his Bachelor of Science degree in chemistry. In 1946, Pierce was hired at his alma mater to rebuild a football program that was discontinued during WWII. He guided the Lobos to 18 consecutive wins, four conference championships, and two bowl games, including the 1949 Tangerine Bowl. He returned to Sul Ross in 1968 as a professor of health and education and chairman of the physical education department. Although better known for his football teams, he had an outstanding record at Sul Ross as the women's volleyball coach. From 1971 to 1975, he directed them to the national tournament three times, won the national championship, and placed fifth in the nation twice.
- Norm Cash (1934–1986) – He was selected All-Lone Star Conference in football and baseball. He was drafted by the Chicago Bears as a running back in 1955, but declined to play pro football. Cash was a first baseman who spent almost his entire career with the Detroit Tigers. An outstanding power hitter, his 377 career home runs were the fourth-most by an AL left-handed hitter when he retired, behind Babe Ruth, Ted Williams, and Lou Gehrig; his 373 home runs with the Tigers rank second in franchise history behind his teammate Al Kaline (399). He also led the AL in assists three times and fielding percentage twice; he ranked among the all-time leaders in assists (fourth, 1317) and double plays (10th, 1347) upon his retirement, and was fifth in AL history in games at first base (1943). Honors include: 1968 World Series Champion, five-time MLB All-Star, and 1961 AL batting champion.
- Gene Alford (1905–1975) (football) – QB Portsmith Spartans NFL 1931–33 and Cincinnati/St. Louis 1934
- Don Bingham (1929–1997) (football) – RB Chicago Bears 1956, BC Lions 1958
- Wilbur Huckle (born 1941) (baseball) – Infielder in the New York Mets minor league system from 1963 to 1971, and managed a Mets farm team from 1972 to 1974. Played baseball at Sul Ross State in 1961 and 1962.
- John Hatley (football) – OL/DL Chicago Bears 1953–1955 and Denver Broncos 1960
- Alfredo Avila (football) – DB Washington Redskins and San Antonio Toros, Little All-America in 1965 and 1966, set a national record with five interceptions in a 1965 game against East Texas State, claimed 36 career interceptions, still a school record
- Randall Carroll (born 1991) (football) – DB free agent contract with the Minnesota Vikings 2014
- Larry Jackson (basketball) – Ninth-round draft choice Atlanta Hawks 1970
- Scott Kubosh (baseball) – All-Conference shortstop 1999, ASC Western Division Player of the year 1999, Pittsburgh Pirates organization with the Johnstown Johnnies of the Frontier League 1999–2000
- Dakota Dill (baseball) – Atlanta Braves organization with Danville Braves of the Appalachian League 2013
- Derrick Bernard (baseball and football) – New York Mets organization with the Port St. Lucie Mets of the Gulf Coast League
- Dominique Carson (football) – 2014 CPIFL Rookie of the Year, RB Dodge City Law, during his final season with the Lobos, Carson led all NCAA Division III players with 2368 all purpose yards. He tied the NCAA record for touchdowns in a game when he scored eight times in a 70–65 victory at Texas Lutheran.
- Mychal Pinson (basketball) – Soles de Mexicali in the Liga Nacional de Baloncesto Profesional Mexico.
