= Sandra A. Gregory =

United States Air Force general

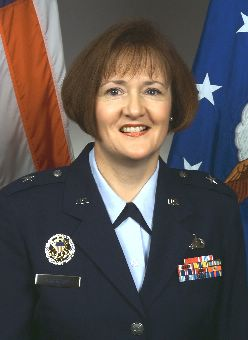
- Brigadier General Gregory, circa 2003
- Born: Loyal, Wisconsin, U.S.A.
- Military career
- Allegiance: United States
- Branch: United States Air Force
- Service years: 1977–2006 (29 years)
- Rank: Brigadier general
- Awards: Legion of Merit, Defense Meritorious Service Medal, Meritorious Service Medal

Sandra A. Gregory was a brigadier general in the United States Air Force. During her career, Gregory served in a variety of comptroller and administrative staff positions throughout the United States Department of Defense including wing and major command level assignments as well as several Pentagon tours.

== Biography ==
A native of Loyal, Wisconsin, Gregory graduated from the University of Wisconsin-Superior in 1977. Later she would also attend Sul Ross State University and the Massachusetts Institute of Technology.

== Career ==
Gregory joined the Air Force in 1977. She was assigned to the 47th Flying Training Wing, the 3rd Tactical Fighter Wing, and to Pacific Air Forces before attending the Air Command and Staff College and the Industrial College of the Armed Forces. Later she served as Military Assistant to the United States Secretary of Defense during the 1993 Presidential Inauguration. After graduating from the Industrial College of the Armed Forces in 1994, she was assigned to work with the Joint Chiefs of Staff and became Chief of the Financial Analysis Division for Budge of the Pacific Air Forces in 1996. In 1999, she was named Director of Financial Management and Comptroller of Air Force Space Command before being assigned to the Office of the Assistant Secretary of the Air Force for Financial Management and Comptroller. Her retirement was effective as of September 1, 2006.

Prior to her retirement she received a letter of admonishment for over-spending the Air Force Permanent Change of Station (PCS) budget by $87 million in 2005.

Awards she has received include the Legion of Merit, the Defense Meritorious Service Medal, the Meritorious Service Medal with four oak leaf clusters, the Air Force Commendation Medal, the Joint Meritorious Unit Award, the Outstanding Unit Award, the Organizational Excellence Award with three oak leaf clusters, the National Defense Service Medal with service star, the Air Force Overseas Short Tour Service Ribbon, the Air Force Longevity Service Award, and the Air Force Training Ribbon.
