= Sul Ross State University =

Public university in Alpine, Texas, US

Coordinates: 30°21′48″N 103°39′00″W

- Former names: Sul Ross Normal College (1917–1923); The Sul Ross State Teachers College, at Alpine (1923–1949); Sul Ross State College (1949–1969)
- Type: Public university
- Established: 1917
- Parent institution: Texas State University System
- Academic affiliations: Hispanic Association of Colleges and Universities
- Endowment: $26.5 million (FY2024) (SRSU only) $1.41 billion (FY2024) (system-wide)
- Budget: $68.4 million (FY2026)
- President: Carlos Hernandez
- Provost: Bernardo Cantens
- Academic staff: 128 (Alpine campus, fall 2013); 43 (Rio Grande College, fall 2013)
- Administrative staff: 490 (full-time equivalent employees, 2015)
- Students: 1,942 (1,441 undergraduate) (Fall 2024)
- Location: Alpine, Texas, United States
- Campus: Rural, 647.05 acres (261.85 ha)
- Colors: Scarlet and Grey
- Nickname: Lobos
- Sporting affiliations: NCAA Division II – LSC; National Intercollegiate Rodeo Association
- Mascot: Sully
- Website: sulross.edu
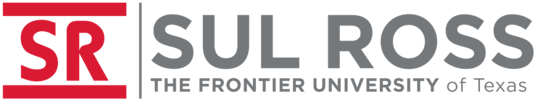

Sul Ross State University (SRSU) is a public university in Alpine, Texas, United States. The main campus is the primary institution of higher education serving the nineteen-county Big Bend region of far West Texas. Branch campuses, branded as Sul Ross State University Rio Grande College, are located in Del Rio, Uvalde, and Eagle Pass.

Named for former Texas governor and Confederate general Lawrence Sullivan Ross, the institution was founded in 1917 as Sul Ross Normal College and was made a university in 1969. It is governed by the Board of Regents of the Texas State University System.

== History ==
On April 14, 1914, Governor James E. Ferguson signed the bill selecting Alpine as the site for a normal school.

It received state university status in 1969.

== Campus ==
The main campus is mostly in the Alpine city limits, though one section is in an unincorporated area.

The campus includes the Everett E. Turner Range Animal Science Center, athletic properties south of the Union Pacific Railroad, west of SH 223, the programs at the old Centennial School, and the university's research working ranch near Sierra Blanca.

== Academics and research ==
=== Facilities and projects of interest ===
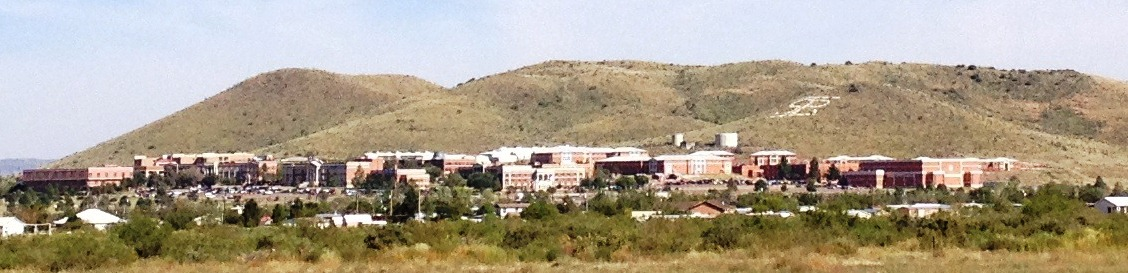
View of Sul Ross State University

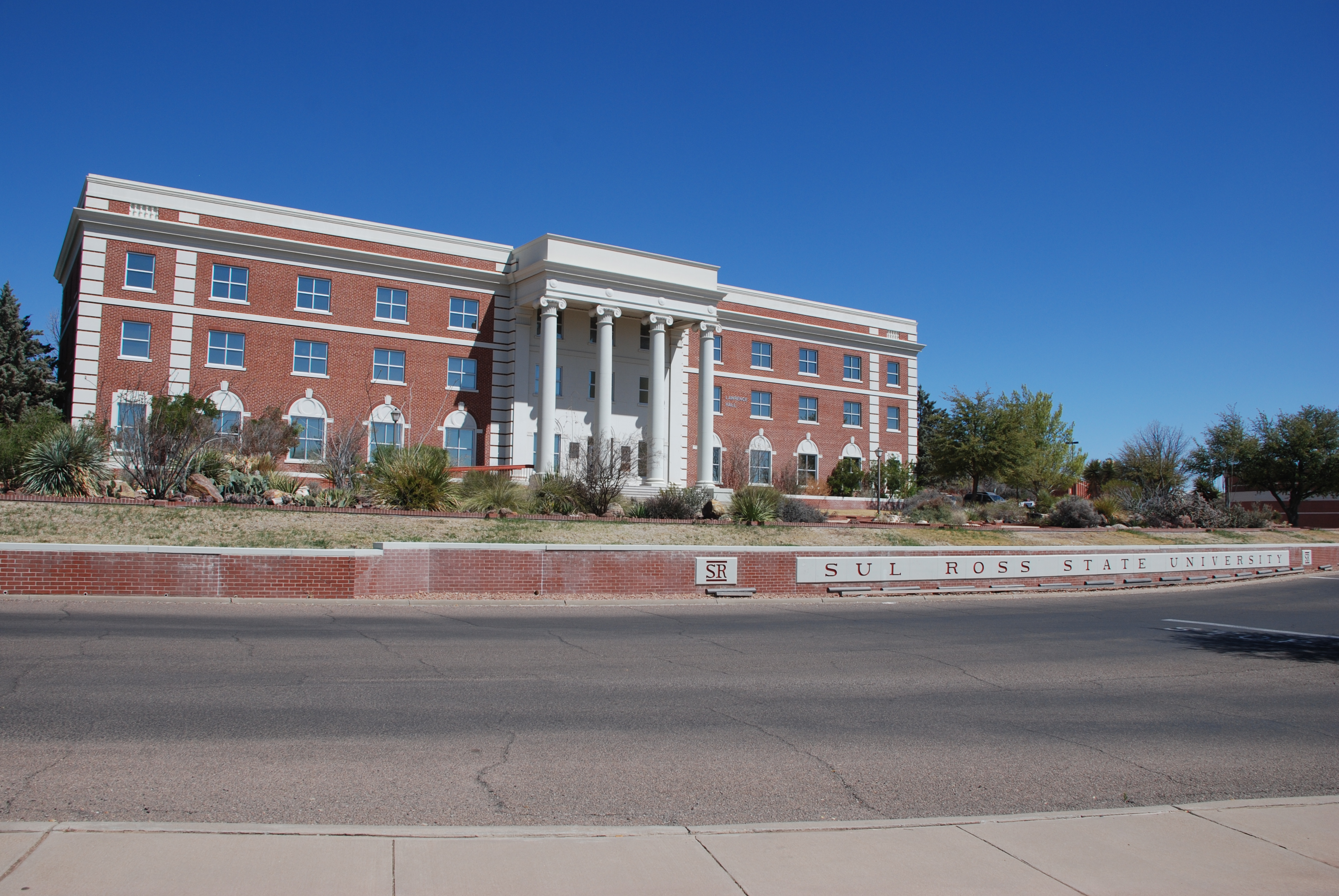
Lawrence Hall, Sul Ross State University

- Archives of the Big Bend
- Borderlands Research Institute for Natural Resource Management
- Center for Big Bend Studies
- Chihuahuan Desert Research Institute
- Chihuahuan Desert Resource, Conservation, and Development Area, Inc.
- Museum of the Big Bend
- Minority and Small Business Development Center
- Bryan Wildenthal Memorial Library
- Arts in West Texas
- Rio Grande Heritage Tourism Project
- Rio Grande Research Center
- Sul Ross State University Alumni Association
- Theatre of the Big Bend
- Jim V. Richerson Invertebrate Collection
- A. Michael Powell Herbarium
- James F. Scuddy Vertebrate Collection

=== University memberships ===
- American Association of State Colleges and Universities
- American Library Association
- Association of Texas Graduate Schools
- Conference of Southern Graduate Schools
- Hispanic Association of Colleges and Universities
- National Association of Foreign Student Affairs
- The Texas Library Association
- National Collegiate Athletic Association
- Texas Interscholastic Athletic Association

== Student life ==
Undergraduate demographics as of Fall 2023
Race and ethnicity	Total
Hispanic	69%
White	20%
Black	7%
Two or more races	2%
American Indian/Alaska Native	1%
Unknown	1%
Economic diversity
Low-income (Note: The percentage of students who received an income-based federal Pell grant intended for low-income students.)	54%
Affluent (Note: The percentage of students who are a part of the American middle class at the bare minimum.)	46%

=== Athletics ===
Sul Ross State athletic teams are called the Lobos. The university is a member of the Division II level of the National Collegiate Athletic Association (NCAA) in the Lone Star Conference.

Sul Ross State competes in 12 intercollegiate varsity sports: Men's sports include baseball, basketball, cross country, football, soccer and tennis; while women's sports include basketball, cross country, soccer, softball, tennis and volleyball.

In July 2023, Lobos athletic programs were approved for reclassification to Division II. On July 1, 2024, the university became a member of the Lone Star Conference.

=== Student housing ===
Student housing is located at Lobo Village. Lobo Village 1 (LV1) and Lobo Village 2 (LV2) are the permanent resident halls for students.

Single students may live in the Lobo Village efficiency apartments in Lobo Village 3 and Lobo Village 4. To live in these apartments, students are required to be 21 or older. Family housing, for couples and students with dependent children, is located in Lobo Village 5, Lobo Village 6, and Lobo Village 7. Residents of the family housing are zoned to the Alpine Independent School District, and are zoned to Alpine Elementary School, Alpine Middle School, and Alpine High School.

== Sul Ross State University Rio Grande College ==
Sul Ross State University (SRSU) operates Rio Grande College (RGC) and SRSU distance learning centers on the campuses of Southwest Texas College (SWTC) in Uvalde, Del Rio, and Eagle Pass. Serving thirteen counties in Southwest Texas, RGC offers both undergraduate and graduate programs.

=== Academic programs ===
Rio Grande College offers college junior, senior and graduate level coursework with programs in liberal arts, business and teacher education and certification at the elementary or secondary level.

Bachelor's degrees in a variety of fields including nursing, education, business, biology, criminal justice, English, Spanish, history, mathematics, psychology, social science as well as child development and organizational leadership are offered.

Master's degrees in English, history, public administration, business, education, criminal justice and health and human performance are also offered.

=== History ===
RGC was renamed by the Texas Legislature as Sul Ross State University Rio Grande College in 1995, recognizing its service to the broad area of the Middle Rio Grande and Wintergarden regions of Texas. Originally known as the SRSU Study Center, the college had been renamed the SRSU Uvalde Study Center in 1985 and again the SRSU Uvalde Center in 1989.

=== Cultural diversity ===
The student body is multicultural and consists of traditional and non-traditional students.

== Notable alumni ==
- Don Bingham, professional football player
- Dan Blocker, actor
- Norm Cash, professional baseball player
- Pete P. Gallego, former U.S. Representative for Texas's 23rd congressional district from 2013 to 2015, president of Sul Ross
- Sandra A. Gregory, United States Air Force Brigadier General
- Tuff Hedeman, professional bull rider
- Erasto B. Mpemba, Tanzanian wildlife officer and, as a schoolboy, discoverer of the Mpemba effect
- Lee Patton, Hall of Fame basketball coach at West Virginia University, star player at Sul Ross.
- Roberta Rudnick, geologist
- J.T. Rutherford, member, U.S. House
- Scotty Walden, college football coach
- Kern Wildenthal, hospital and university administrator
