= List of Mount Union Purple Raiders football seasons =

The Mount Union Purple Raiders football team competes as part of the National Collegiate Athletic Association (NCAA) in Division III, representing the University of Mount Union in the Ohio Athletic Conference (OAC). Mount Union plays their home games at Mount Union Stadium in Alliance, Ohio since 1913. The program has won 13 NCAA Division III Football Championships and eight runner-ups. With more than 800 wins, the Purple Raiders rank in the top 20 in most wins in NCAA history, and the most of any team in Division III. From 1893 until 1913, Mount Union played as an independent, then joining the OAC in 1914, has remained their ever since. From October 22, 2005 until December 12, 2016, the Purple Raiders won 112 consecutive games, the most in NCAA History.

== Seasons ==
National champions †	Conference champions *	Playoff berth ^

Season	Head coach	Conference	Season results						Postseason results
Season	Head coach	Conference				Conference			Postseason results
Season	Head coach	Conference	Won	Lost	Tied	Won	Lost	Tied	Postseason results
Mount Union Purple Raiders
1893	No coach	Independent	1	2	0	—	—	—	
1894	Herbert C. Davis	Independent	4	5	0	—	—	—	
1895	No team								
1896	Albert J. Norton	Independent	3	4	1	—	—	—	
1897	Joe L. Stamp	Independent	2	4	1	—	—	—	
1898	No team								
1899	Melvin L. Battles	Independent	5	1	1	—	—	—	
1900	Wendell H. Phelps	Independent	1	4	1	—	—	—	
1901	Campbell	Independent	5	5	1	—	—	—	
1902	Frank Halliday	Independent	6	3	0	—	—	—	
1903	Pearl Sommerville	Independent	2	5	1	—	—	—	
1904	Pearl Sommerville	Independent	2	6	0	—	—	—	
1905	Roy Beechler	Independent	2	6	0	—	—	—	
1906	Harry Pierce	Independent	2	5	1	—	—	—	
1907	E. J. Stewart	Independent	9	2	0	—	—	—	
1908	H. B. Emerson	Independent	5	4	1	—	—	—	
1909	Robert Dawson	Independent	8	2	0	—	—	—	
1910	Robert Dawson	Independent	4	2	2	—	—	—	
1911	Robert Dawson	Independent	7	2	0	—	—	—	
1912	Robert Dawson	Independent	9	2	0	—	—	—	
1913	Robert Dawson	Independent	4	3	2	—	—	—	
1914	Robert Dawson	OAC	6	4	0	4	1	0	
1915	Robert Dawson	OAC	3	7	0	0	5	0	
1916	Robert Dawson	OAC	8	2	0	6	1	0	
1917	George O'Brien	OAC	2	6	0	1	5	0	
1918	George O'Brien	OAC	6	1	0	5	1	0	
1919	George O'Brien	OAC	1	7	0	0	5	0	
1920	Eddie Casey	OAC	6	3	0	3	3	0	
1921	Eddie Casey	OAC	1	6	1	0	5	1	
1922	John M. Thorpe	OAC	6	2	1	5	2	0	
1923	John M. Thorpe	OAC	5	4	0	3	3	0	
1924	John M. Thorpe	OAC	5	4	1	4	3	1	
1925	John M. Thorpe	OAC	7	2	1	4	2	1	
1926	John M. Thorpe	OAC	6	3	0	5	3	0	
1927	John M. Thorpe	OAC	6	2	1	5	2	0	
1928	John M. Thorpe	OAC	4	5	0	4	2	0	
1929	John M. Thorpe	OAC	5	3	1	4	2	1	
1930	John M. Thorpe	OAC	4	5	1	3	3	0	
1931	John M. Thorpe	OAC	7	2	1	4	1	0	
1932	Harry Geltz	OAC	1	8	0	1	6	0	
1933	Harry Geltz	OAC	3	5	1	3	4	1	
1934	Harry Geltz	OAC	4	4	0	4	3	0	
1935	Harry Geltz	OAC	7	1	1	6	1	1	
1936	Harry Geltz	OAC	7	1	1	3	1	0	
1937	Harry Geltz	OAC	3	3	3	2	2	2	
1938	Harry Geltz	OAC	5	3	0	4	2	0	
1939	Harry Geltz	OAC	3	5	1	2	3	1	
1940	Harry Geltz	OAC	0	8	1	0	6	0	
1941	Harry Geltz	OAC	1	7	0	0	5	0	
1942	Pete Pederson	OAC	1	6	0	0	5	0	
1943	No Team - World War II								
1944	No Team - World War II								
1945	No Team - World War II								
1946	Pete Pederson	OAC	7	1	1	3	1	1	
1947	Pete Pederson	OAC	5	4	0	3	2	0	
1948	Pete Pederson	OAC	6	3	0	5	2	0	
1949	Pete Pederson	OAC	3	6	0	2	3	0	
1950	Nelson Jones	OAC	6	2	0	3	1	0	
1951	Nelson Jones	OAC	3	4	1	2	1	0	
1952	Nelson Jones	OAC	1	7	0	1	4	0	
1953	Nelson Jones	OAC	5	4	0	2	3	0	
1954	Nelson Jones	OAC	2	7	0	1	6	0	
1955	Nelson Jones	OAC	1	5	2	1	5	1	
1956	Duke Barret	OAC	2	6	0	2	5	0	
1957	Duke Barret	OAC	2	6	0	2	6	0	
1958	Duke Barret	OAC	3	6	0	3	6	0	
1959	Duke Barret	OAC	2	7	0	2	6	0	
1960	Duke Barret	OAC	3	6	0	3	5	0	
1961	Duke Barret	OAC	3	6	0	2	5	0	
1962	Ken Wable	OAC	3	6	0	2	5	0	
1963	Ken Wable	OAC	1	8	0	1	5	0	
1964	Ken Wable	OAC	4	5	0	3	3	0	
1965	Ken Wable	OAC	7	2	0	5	2	0	
1966	Ken Wable	OAC	4	5	0	3	3	0	
1967	Ken Wable	OAC	2	6	1	2	5	1	
1968	Ken Wable	OAC	5	4	0	3	3	0	
1969	Ken Wable	OAC	5	4	0	3	3	0	
1970	Ken Wable	OAC	8	1	0	4	1	0	
1971	Ken Wable	OAC	7	2	0	3	1	0	
1972	Ken Wable	OAC	1	8	0	0	5	0	
1973	Ken Wable	OAC	3	6	0	0	5	0	
1974	Ken Wable	OAC	7	2	0	3	1	0	
1975	Ken Wable	OAC	7	2	0	2	2	0	
1976	Ken Wable	OAC	3	6	0	1	4	0	
1977	Ken Wable	OAC	4	5	0	2	3	0	
1978	Ken Wable	OAC	4	4	1	2	3	0	
1979	Ken Wable	OAC	7	2	0	3	2	0	
1980	Ken Wable	OAC	5	4	0	3	2	0	
1981	Ken Wable	OAC	5	4	0	4	1	0	
1982	Ken Wable	OAC	8	1	0	4	1	0	
1983	Ken Wable	OAC	6	3	0	2	3	0	
1984	Ken Wable	OAC	6	4	0	5	3	0	
1985*	Ken Wable	OAC	11	1	0	8	0	0	NCAA Division III - Second Round^
1986*	Larry Kehres	OAC	11	1	0	8	0	0	NCAA Division III - Second Round^
1987	Larry Kehres	OAC	6	4	0	6	2	0	
1988	Larry Kehres	OAC	6	3	1	5	2	1	
1989	Larry Kehres	OAC	7	2	1	6	1	1	
1990*	Larry Kehres	OAC	10	1	0	9	0	0	NCAA Division III - First Round^
1991	Larry Kehres	OAC	8	1	1	7	1	1	
1992*	Larry Kehres	OAC	12	1	0	9	0	0	NCAA Division III - Semifinalist^
1993*†	Larry Kehres	OAC	14	0	0	9	0	0	National champions^
1994*	Larry Kehres	OAC	10	2	0	8	1	0	NCAA Division III - Semifinalist^
1995*	Larry Kehres	OAC	12	1	—	9	0	—	NCAA Division III - Semifinalist^
1996*†	Larry Kehres	OAC	14	0	—	9	0	—	National champions^
1997*†	Larry Kehres	OAC	14	0	—	9	0	—	National champions^
1998*†	Larry Kehres	OAC	14	0	—	9	0	—	National champions^
1999*	Larry Kehres	OAC	12	1	—	9	0	—	NCAA Division III - Semifinalist^
2000*†	Larry Kehres	OAC	14	0	—	9	0	—	National champions^
2001*†	Larry Kehres	OAC	14	0	—	9	0	—	National champions^
2002*†	Larry Kehres	OAC	14	0	—	9	0	—	National champions^
2003*	Larry Kehres	OAC	13	1	—	9	0	—	National Runner-up^
2004*	Larry Kehres	OAC	12	1	—	9	0	—	NCAA Division III - Semifinalist^
2005*†	Larry Kehres	OAC	14	1	—	8	1	—	National champions^
2006*†	Larry Kehres	OAC	15	0	—	9	0	—	National champions^
2007*	Larry Kehres	OAC	14	1	—	9	0	—	National Runner-up^
2008*†	Larry Kehres	OAC	15	0	—	9	0	—	National champions^
2009*	Larry Kehres	OAC	14	1	—	9	0	—	National Runner-up^
2010*	Larry Kehres	OAC	14	1	—	9	0	—	National Runner-up^
2011*	Larry Kehres	OAC	14	1	—	9	0	—	National Runner-up^
2012*†	Larry Kehres	OAC	15	0	—	9	0	—	National champions^
2013*	Vince Kehres	OAC	14	1	—	9	0	—	National Runner-up^
2014*	Vince Kehres	OAC	14	1	—	9	0	—	National Runner-up^
2015*†	Vince Kehres	OAC	15	0	—	9	0	—	National champions^
2016	Vince Kehres	OAC	12	2	—	8	1	—	NCAA Division III - Semifinalist^
2017*†	Vince Kehres	OAC	15	0	—	9	0	—	National champions^
2018*	Vince Kehres	OAC	14	1	—	9	0	—	National Runner-up^
2019*	Vince Kehres	OAC	11	1	—	9	0	—	NCAA Division III - Second Round^
2020–21*	Geoff Dartt	OAC	4	0	—	4	0	—	No playoffs
2021*	Geoff Dartt	OAC	13	1	—	9	0	—	NCAA Division III - Semifinalist^
2022*	Geoff Dartt	OAC	14	1	—	9	0	—	National Runner-up^
2023*	Geoff Dartt	OAC	11	1	—	9	0	—	NCAA Division III - Second Round^
2024*	Geoff Dartt	OAC	14	1	—	9	0	—	National Runner-up^
2025*	Geoff Dartt	OAC	11	1	—	8	0	—	NCAA Division III - Third Round^
2026	Geoff Dartt	OAC	7	3	—	6	2	—	
