= List of NCAA Division III football seasons =

This is a list of NCAA Division III college football seasons. Prior to 1973, Division III schools participated in the NCAA's College Division.

== Seasons ==
Year	Champion	John Gagliardi Trophy Winner
1973	Wittenberg	—
1974	Central College (IA)	—
1975	Wittenberg (2)	—
1976	St. John's (MN)	—
1977	Widener	—
1978	Baldwin Wallace	—
1979	Ithaca	—
1980	Dayton	—
1981	Widener (2)	—
1982	West Georgia	—
1983	Augustana (IL)	—
1984	Augustana (IL) (2)	—
1985	Augustana (IL) (3)	—
1986	Augustana (IL) (4)	—
1987	Wagner	—
1988	Ithaca (2)	—
1989	Dayton (2)	—
1990	Allegheny	—
1991	Ithaca (3)	—
1992	Wisconsin–La Crosse	—
1993	Mount Union	Jim Ballard, Mount Union (QB)
1994	Albion	Carey Bender, Coe (RB)
1995	Wisconsin–La Crosse (2)	Chris Palmer, St. John's (MN) (WR)
1996	Mount Union (2)	Lon Erickson, Illinois Wesleyan (QB)
1997	Mount Union (3)	Bill Borchert, Mount Union (QB)
1998	Mount Union (4)	Scott Hvistendahl, Augsburg (WR, P)
1999	Pacific Lutheran	Danny Ragsdale, Redlands (QB)
2000	Mount Union (5)	Chad Johnson, Pacific Lutheran (QB)
2001	Mount Union (6)	Chuck Moore, Mount Union (RB)
2002	Mount Union (7)	Dan Pugh, Mount Union (RB)
2003	St. John's (MN) (2)	Blake Elliott, St. John's (MN) (WR, P, KR)
2004	Linfield	Rocky Myers, Wesley (DE) (S)
2005	Mount Union (8)	Brett Elliott, Linfield (QB)
2006	Mount Union (9)	Josh Brehm, Alma (QB)
2007	Wisconsin–Whitewater	Justin Beaver, Wisconsin–Whitewater (RB)
2008	Mount Union (10)	Greg Micheli, Mount Union (QB)
2009	Wisconsin–Whitewater (2)	Blaine Westemeyer, Augustana (IL) (OT)
2010	Wisconsin–Whitewater (3)	Eric Watt, Trine (QB)
2011	Wisconsin–Whitewater (4)	Michael Zweifel, Dubuque (WR)
2012	Mount Union (11)	Scottie Williams, Elmhurst (IL) (RB)
2013	Wisconsin–Whitewater (5)	Kevin Burke, Mount Union (QB)
2014	Wisconsin–Whitewater (6)	Kevin Burke, Mount Union (QB)
2015	Mount Union (12)	Joe Callahan, Wesley (DE) (QB)
2016	Mary Hardin–Baylor (vacated)	Carter Hanson, St. John's (MN) (LB)
2017	Mount Union (13)	Brett Kasper, Wisconsin–Oshkosh (QB)
2018	Mary Hardin–Baylor	Jackson Erdmann, Saint John's (MN) (QB)
2019	North Central (IL)	Broc Rutter, North Central (IL) (QB)
2020	Not held	Not awarded
2021	Mary Hardin–Baylor (2)	Blaine Hawkins, Central (IA) (QB)
2022	North Central (IL) (2)	Ethan Greenfield, North Central (IL) (RB)
2023	Cortland	Luke Lehnen, North Central (IL) (QB)
2024	North Central (IL) (3)	Luke Lehnen, North Central (IL) (QB)
2025	Wisconsin–River Falls	Kaleb Blaha, Wisconsin–River Falls (QB)

== See also ==
- List of NCAA Division I-A/FBS football seasons
- List of NCAA Division I-AA/FCS football seasons
- List of NCAA Division II football seasons
