= List of Ohio Athletic Conference football standings (1998–present) =

This is a list of yearly Ohio Athletic Conference football standings.

== Ohio Athletic Conference football standings ==
=== NCAA Division III (1998–present) ===
1998 Ohio Athletic Conference football standings
	Conf.			Overall
Team	W		L	W		L
Mount Union $^	9	–	0	14	–	0
Baldwin–Wallace	8	–	1	8	–	2
John Carroll	7	–	2	8	–	2
Ohio Northern	6	–	3	7	–	3
Marietta	5	–	4	6	–	4
Muskingum	4	–	5	5	–	5
Otterbein	3	–	6	4	–	6
Heidelberg	2	–	7	2	–	8
Hiram	1	–	8	2	–	8
Capital	0	–	9	1	–	9
$ – Conference champion; ^ – NCAA Division III playoff participant

1999 Ohio Athletic Conference football standings
	Conf.			Overall
Team	W		L	W		L
Mount Union $^	9	–	0	12	–	1
Ohio Northern ^	8	–	1	11	–	2
John Carroll	6	–	3	7	–	3
Otterbein	6	–	3	7	–	3
Baldwin–Wallace	6	–	3	6	–	4
Heidelberg	4	–	5	4	–	6
Muskingum	2	–	7	3	–	7
Capital	2	–	7	2	–	8
Marietta	2	–	7	2	–	8
Hiram	0	–	9	0	–	10
$ – Conference champion; ^ – NCAA Division III playoff participant

2000 Ohio Athletic Conference football standings
	Conf.			Overall
Team	W		L	W		L
Mount Union $^	9	–	0	14	–	0
Ohio Northern ^	8	–	1	9	–	3
Wilmington (OH)	7	–	2	7	–	3
John Carroll	6	–	3	7	–	3
Baldwin–Wallace	5	–	4	5	–	5
Muskingum	3	–	6	4	–	6
Otterbein	3	–	6	4	–	6
Capital	2	–	7	3	–	7
Marietta	2	–	7	3	–	7
Heidelberg	0	–	9	0	–	10
$ – Conference champion; ^ – NCAA Division III playoff participant

2001 Ohio Athletic Conference football standings
	Conf.			Overall
Team	W		L	W		L
Mount Union $^	9	–	0	14	–	0
Ohio Northern	8	–	1	8	–	2
Capital	6	–	3	7	–	3
John Carroll	6	–	3	7	–	3
Baldwin–Wallace	5	–	4	5	–	5
Wilmington (OH)	4	–	5	5	–	5
Otterbein	3	–	6	4	–	6
Muskingum	2	–	7	3	–	7
Marietta	1	–	8	2	–	8
Heidelberg	1	–	8	1	–	9
$ – Conference champion; ^ – NCAA Division III playoff participant

2002 Ohio Athletic Conference football standings
	Conf.			Overall
Team	W		L	W		L
Mount Union $^	9	–	0	14	–	0
John Carroll ^	8	–	1	12	–	2
Baldwin–Wallace	7	–	2	8	–	2
Capital	6	–	3	6	–	4
Ohio Northern	5	–	4	5	–	5
Muskingum	3	–	6	3	–	7
Marietta	2	–	7	3	–	7
Wilmington (OH)	2	–	7	3	–	7
Heidelberg	2	–	7	2	–	8
Otterbein	1	–	8	2	–	8
$ – Conference champion; ^ – NCAA Division III playoff participant

2003 Ohio Athletic Conference football standings
	Conf.			Overall
Team	W		L	W		L
No. 2 Mount Union $^	9	–	0	13	–	1
No. 9 Baldwin–Wallace ^	8	–	1	10	–	2
Capital	7	–	2	8	–	2
John Carroll	6	–	3	7	–	3
Muskingum	4	–	5	5	–	5
Ohio Northern	4	–	5	4	–	6
Otterbein	3	–	6	3	–	7
Wilmington (OH)	2	–	7	2	–	8
Marietta	1	–	8	2	–	8
Heidelberg	1	–	8	1	–	9
$ – Conference champion; ^ – NCAA Division III playoff participant; Rankings from D3football.com

2004 Ohio Athletic Conference football standings
	Conf.			Overall
Team	W		L	W		L
No. 3 Mount Union $^	9	–	0	12	–	1
No. 19 Ohio Northern	7	–	2	8	–	2
Capital	6	–	3	7	–	3
John Carroll	6	–	3	6	–	4
Baldwin–Wallace	5	–	4	6	–	4
Marietta	5	–	4	5	–	4
Otterbein	3	–	6	4	–	6
Wilmington (OH)	3	–	6	3	–	7
Muskingum	1	–	8	1	–	9
Heidelberg	0	–	9	0	–	10
$ – Conference champion; ^ – NCAA Division III playoff participant; Rankings from D3football.com

2005 Ohio Athletic Conference football standings
	Conf.			Overall
Team	W		L	W		L
No. 1 Mount Union $^	8	–	1	14	–	1
No. 18 Ohio Northern	7	–	2	8	–	2
No. 5 Capital ^	7	–	2	10	–	3
John Carroll	6	–	3	7	–	3
Otterbein	6	–	3	7	–	3
Marietta	4	–	5	5	–	5
Baldwin–Wallace	3	–	6	4	–	6
Muskingum	2	–	7	2	–	8
Wilmington (OH)	2	–	7	2	–	8
Heidelberg	0	–	9	0	–	10
$ – Conference champion; ^ – NCAA Division III playoff participant; Rankings from D3football.com

2006 Ohio Athletic Conference football standings
	Conf.			Overall
Team	W		L	W		L
No. 1 Mount Union $^	9	–	0	15	–	0
No. 3 Capital ^	8	–	1	11	–	2
Baldwin–Wallace	6	–	3	7	–	3
Marietta	5	–	4	6	–	4
Ohio Northern	5	–	4	6	–	4
John Carroll	5	–	4	5	–	5
Otterbein	3	–	6	4	–	6
Wilmington (OH)	3	–	6	3	–	7
Muskingum	1	–	8	2	–	8
Heidelberg	0	–	9	0	–	10
$ – Conference champion; ^ – NCAA Division III playoff participant; Rankings from D3football.com

2007 Ohio Athletic Conference football standings
	Conf.			Overall
Team	W		L	W		L
No. 2 Mount Union $^	9	–	0	14	–	1
No. 13 Capital ^	7	–	2	8	–	3
Ohio Northern	6	–	3	7	–	3
Baldwin–Wallace	5	–	4	6	–	4
John Carroll	5	–	4	6	–	4
Otterbein	5	–	4	5	–	5
Heidelberg	3	–	6	4	–	6
Marietta	3	–	6	3	–	7
Wilmington (OH)	2	–	7	2	–	8
Muskingum	0	–	9	0	–	10
$ – Conference champion; ^ – NCAA Division III playoff participant; Rankings from D3football.com

2008 Ohio Athletic Conference football standings
	Conf.			Overall
Team	W		L	W		L
No. 1 Mount Union $^	9	–	0	15	–	0
No. 19 Otterbein ^	8	–	1	9	–	2
Baldwin–Wallace	5	–	4	5	–	5
Ohio Northern	5	–	4	5	–	5
Capital	4	–	5	5	–	5
John Carroll	4	–	5	5	–	5
Wilmington (OH)	4	–	5	4	–	6
Heidelberg	3	–	6	4	–	6
Muskingum	2	–	7	3	–	7
Marietta	1	–	8	2	–	8
$ – Conference champion; ^ – NCAA Division III playoff participant; Rankings from D3football.com

2009 Ohio Athletic Conference football standings
	Conf.			Overall
Team	W		L	W		L
No. 2 Mount Union $^	9	–	0	14	–	1
No. 13 Ohio Northern	7	–	2	8	–	2
Otterbein	7	–	2	8	–	2
Capital	6	–	3	7	–	3
Muskingum	4	–	5	4	–	6
Heidelberg	3	–	6	4	–	6
Baldwin–Wallace	3	–	6	3	–	7
John Carroll	3	–	6	3	–	7
Marietta	2	–	7	3	–	7
Wilmington (OH)	1	–	8	1	–	9
$ – Conference champion; ^ – NCAA Division III playoff participant; Rankings from D3football.com

2010 Ohio Athletic Conference football standings
	Conf.			Overall
Team	W		L	W		L
No. 2 Mount Union $^	9	–	0	14	–	1
No. 8 Ohio Northern ^	8	–	1	10	–	2
Baldwin–Wallace	6	–	3	7	–	3
Otterbein	5	–	4	6	–	4
Capital	5	–	4	5	–	5
John Carroll	5	–	4	5	–	5
Heidelberg	4	–	5	5	–	5
Muskingum	2	–	7	3	–	7
Marietta	1	–	8	2	–	8
Wilmington (OH)	0	–	9	0	–	10
$ – Conference champion; ^ – NCAA Division III playoff participant; Rankings from D3football.com

2011 Ohio Athletic Conference football standings
	Conf.			Overall
Team	W		L	W		L
No. 2 Mount Union $^	9	–	0	14	–	1
No. 24 Baldwin–Wallace	7	–	2	8	–	2
Heidelberg	7	–	2	8	–	2
Ohio Northern	5	–	4	6	–	4
Capital	5	–	4	5	–	5
John Carroll	5	–	4	5	–	5
Muskingum	3	–	6	4	–	6
Marietta	2	–	7	3	–	7
Otterbein	2	–	7	3	–	7
Wilmington (OH)	0	–	9	0	–	10
$ – Conference champion; ^ – NCAA Division III playoff participant; Rankings from D3football.com

2012 Ohio Athletic Conference football standings
	Conf.			Overall
Team	W		L	W		L
No. 1 Mount Union $^	9	–	0	15	–	0
No. 19 Heidelberg ^	8	–	1	9	–	2
Otterbein	7	–	2	8	–	2
Baldwin Wallace	6	–	3	7	–	3
John Carroll	5	–	4	6	–	4
Ohio Northern	4	–	5	4	–	6
Muskingum	3	–	6	3	–	7
Capital	2	–	7	2	–	8
Wilmington (OH)	1	–	8	1	–	9
Marietta	0	–	9	0	–	10
$ – Conference champion; ^ – NCAA Division III playoff participant; Rankings from D3football.com

2013 Ohio Athletic Conference football standings
	Conf.			Overall
Team	W		L	W		L
No. 3 Mount Union $^	9	–	0	14	–	1
No. 13 John Carroll ^	8	–	1	9	–	2
No. 21 Heidelberg	7	–	2	8	–	2
Baldwin Wallace	5	–	4	6	–	4
Ohio Northern	5	–	4	6	–	4
Otterbein	5	–	4	5	–	5
Capital	3	–	6	3	–	7
Muskingum	2	–	7	2	–	8
Marietta	1	–	8	1	–	9
Wilmington (OH)	0	–	9	0	–	10
$ – Conference champion; ^ – NCAA Division III playoff participant; Rankings from D3football.com

2014 Ohio Athletic Conference football standings
	Conf.			Overall
Team	W		L	W		L
No. 2 Mount Union $^	9	–	0	14	–	1
No. 5 John Carroll ^	8	–	1	11	–	2
Heidelberg	7	–	2	8	–	2
Ohio Northern	6	–	3	7	–	3
Otterbein	5	–	4	5	–	5
Baldwin Wallace	4	–	5	5	–	5
Muskingum	3	–	6	3	–	7
Capital	2	–	7	3	–	7
Marietta	1	–	8	2	–	8
Wilmington (OH)	0	–	9	0	–	10
$ – Conference champion; ^ – NCAA Division III playoff participant; Rankings from D3football.com

2015 Ohio Athletic Conference football standings
	Conf.			Overall
Team	W		L	W		L
No. 1 Mount Union $^	9	–	0	15	–	0
No. 22 John Carroll	7	–	2	8	–	2
No. 19 Ohio Northern ^	7	–	2	9	–	3
Baldwin Wallace	7	–	2	7	–	3
Heidelberg	5	–	4	5	–	5
Otterbein	4	–	5	4	–	6
Capital	3	–	6	3	–	7
Marietta	2	–	7	2	–	8
Muskingum	1	–	8	1	–	9
Wilmington (OH)	0	–	9	1	–	9
$ – Conference champion; ^ – NCAA Division III playoff participant; Rankings from D3football.com

2016 Ohio Athletic Conference football standings
	Conf.			Overall
Team	W		L	W		L
No. 3 John Carroll $^	9	–	0	12	–	2
No. 4 Mount Union ^	8	–	1	12	–	2
Heidelberg	6	–	3	6	–	4
Ohio Northern	5	–	4	5	–	5
Otterbein	5	–	4	5	–	5
Capital	4	–	5	4	–	6
Muskingum	3	–	6	4	–	6
Marietta	3	–	6	3	–	7
Baldwin Wallace	2	–	7	3	–	7
Wilmington (OH)	0	–	9	0	–	10
$ – Conference champion; ^ – NCAA Division III playoff participant; Rankings from D3football.com

2017 Ohio Athletic Conference football standings
	Conf.			Overall
Team	W		L	W		L
No. 1 Mount Union $^	9	–	0	15	–	0
Heidelberg	6	–	3	7	–	3
Ohio Northern	6	–	3	7	–	3
John Carroll	6	–	3	6	–	4
Baldwin Wallace	5	–	4	6	–	4
Marietta	5	–	4	6	–	4
Otterbein	5	–	4	6	–	4
Muskingum	1	–	8	2	–	8
Wilmington (OH)	1	–	8	2	–	8
Capital	1	–	8	1	–	9
$ – Conference champion; ^ – NCAA Division III playoff participant; Rankings from D3football.com

2018 Ohio Athletic Conference football standings
	Conf.			Overall
Team	W		L	W		L
No. 2 Mount Union $^	9	–	0	14	–	1
No. 20 John Carroll ^	8	–	1	9	–	2
Baldwin Wallace	7	–	2	8	–	2
Marietta	6	–	3	7	–	3
Heidelberg	4	–	5	5	–	5
Ohio Northern	4	–	5	5	–	5
Muskingum	3	–	6	4	–	6
Capital	3	–	6	3	–	7
Otterbein	1	–	8	2	–	8
Wilmington (OH)	0	–	9	1	–	9
$ – Conference champion; ^ – NCAA Division III playoff participant; Rankings from D3football.com

2019 Ohio Athletic Conference football standings
	Conf.			Overall
Team	W		L	W		L
No. 3 Mount Union $^	9	–	0	11	–	1
No. 13 John Carroll	8	–	1	9	–	1
Baldwin Wallace	6	–	3	7	–	3
Ohio Northern	6	–	3	6	–	4
Heidelberg	5	–	4	6	–	4
Marietta	4	–	5	5	–	5
Wilmington (OH)	3	–	6	3	–	7
Muskingum	2	–	7	3	–	7
Otterbein	2	–	7	2	–	8
Capital	0	–	9	0	–	10
$ – Conference champion; ^ – NCAA Division III playoff participant; Rankings from D3football.com

2020 Ohio Athletic Conference football standings
	Conf.			Overall
Team	W		L	W		L
Mount Union $	4	–	0	4	–	0
Heidelberg	4	–	1	4	–	1
Ohio Northern	3	–	1	3	–	1
John Carroll	2	–	1	2	–	1
Marietta	3	–	2	3	–	2
Wilmington (OH)	2	–	3	2	–	3
Muskingum	1	–	2	1	–	2
Otterbein	1	–	4	1	–	4
Baldwin Wallace	0	–	2	0	–	2
Capital	0	–	4	0	–	4
$ – Conference champion

2021 Ohio Athletic Conference football standings
	Conf.			Overall
Team	W		L	W		L
No. 4 Mount Union $^	9	–	0	13	–	1
Baldwin Wallace	7	–	2	8	–	2
Heidelberg	7	–	2	8	–	2
John Carroll	7	–	2	7	–	3
Muskingum	4	–	5	5	–	5
Marietta	4	–	5	4	–	6
Ohio Northern	3	–	6	4	–	6
Wilmington (OH)	2	–	7	2	–	8
Capital	1	–	8	2	–	8
Otterbein	1	–	8	1	–	9
$ – Conference champion; ^ – NCAA Division III playoff participant; Rankings from AFCA Poll

2022 Ohio Athletic Conference football standings
	Conf.			Overall
Team	W		L	W		L
No. 2 Mount Union $^	9	–	0	14	–	1
John Carroll	8	–	1	8	–	2
Baldwin Wallace	7	–	2	7	–	3
Heidelberg	6	–	3	7	–	3
Marietta	5	–	4	6	–	4
Muskingum	4	–	5	5	–	5
Ohio Northern	3	–	6	3	–	7
Wilmington (OH)	2	–	7	3	–	7
Otterbein	1	–	8	2	–	8
Capital	0	–	9	0	–	10
$ – Conference champion; ^ – NCAA Division III playoff participant; Rankings from d3football.com

2023 Ohio Athletic Conference football standings
	Conf.			Overall
Team	W		L	W		L
No. 9 Mount Union $^	9	–	0	11	–	1
No. 20 John Carroll	8	–	1	8	–	2
Marietta	7	–	2	8	–	2
Baldwin Wallace	6	–	3	6	–	4
Heidelberg	5	–	4	6	–	4
Ohio Northern	4	–	5	4	–	6
Muskingum	3	–	6	4	–	6
Wilmington (OH)	2	–	7	3	–	7
Capital	1	–	8	1	–	9
Otterbein	0	–	9	0	–	10
$ – Conference champion; ^ – NCAA Division III playoff participant; Rankings from D3Football.com

2024 Ohio Athletic Conference football standings
	Conf.			Overall
Team	W		L	W		L
No. 5 Mount Union $^	9	–	0	14	–	1
No. 24 John Carroll ^	8	–	1	9	–	3
Marietta	7	–	2	8	–	3
Baldwin Wallace	6	–	3	7	–	3
Heidelberg	4	–	5	5	–	5
Muskingum	4	–	5	5	–	5
Ohio Northern	4	–	5	5	–	5
Capital	1	–	8	1	–	9
Otterbein	1	–	8	1	–	9
Wilmington (OH)	1	–	8	1	–	9
$ – Conference champion; ^ – NCAA Division III playoff participant; Rankings from D3Football.com

2025 Ohio Athletic Conference football standings
	Conf.			Overall
Team	W		L	W		L
No. 6 Mount Union $^	8	–	0	11	–	1
Ohio Northern	7	–	1	8	–	3
Baldwin Wallace	6	–	2	8	–	2
Heidelberg	5	–	3	6	–	4
Muskingum	4	–	4	4	–	6
Marietta	3	–	5	5	–	5
Capital	1	–	7	3	–	7
Wilmington (OH)	1	–	7	3	–	7
Otterbein	1	–	7	1	–	9
$ – Conference champion; ^ – NCAA Division III playoff participant; Rankings from D3Football.com
