= Diamond, Ohio =

Unincorporated community in Ohio, U.S.

Coordinates: 41°05′56″N 81°01′22″W

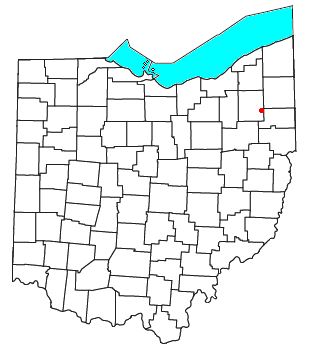
Location of Diamond, Ohio

Diamond is an unincorporated community in eastern Palmyra Township, Portage County, Ohio, United States. It has a post office with the ZIP code 44412. The community is part of the Akron Metropolitan Statistical Area. Interstate 76 travels near Diamond. The town used to be a stop on the New York Central Railroad, but the stop was abandoned in the early 1970s.

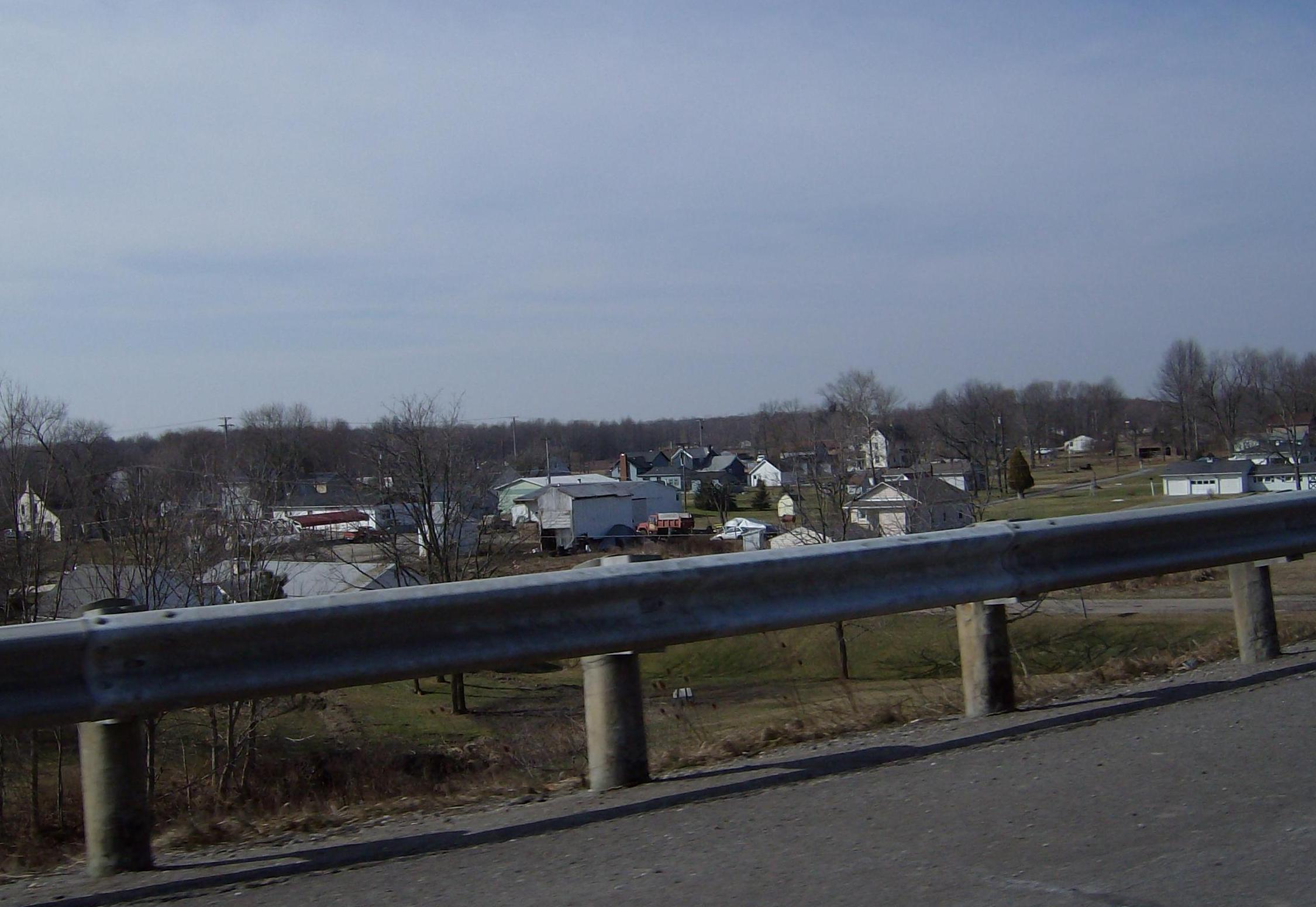
View of parts of Diamond from I-76

A post office called Diamond has been in operation since 1880. Diamond was originally a coal mining community, and the Black Diamond Coal Company operated there.

== Notable person ==
- Larry Kehres, athletic director and former football coach for the University of Mount Union
