= 2000 NCAA Division III football season =

American college football season

- Regular season: August – November 2000
- Playoffs: November – December 2000
- National championship: Salem Football Stadium; Salem, VA
- Champion: Mount Union (5)
- Gagliardi Trophy: Chad Johnson (QB), Pacific Lutheran

The 2000 NCAA Division III football season, part of the college football season organized by the NCAA at the Division III level in the United States, began in August 2000, and concluded with the NCAA Division III Football Championship, also known as the Stagg Bowl, in December 2000 at Salem Football Stadium in Salem, Virginia. The Mount Union Purple Raiders won their fifth Division III championship by defeating the Saint John's (MN) Johnnies, 10−7.

The Gagliardi Trophy, given to the most outstanding player in Division III football, was awarded to Chad Johnson, quarterback from Pacific Lutheran.

== Conference standings ==
2000 American Southwest Conference football standings
	Conf.			Overall
Team	W		L	W		L
Hardin–Simmons $^	9	–	0	12	–	1
Mary Hardin–Baylor	8	–	1	9	–	1
Austin	6	–	3	7	–	3
Howard Payne	6	–	3	6	–	4
McMurry	5	–	4	6	–	4
Texas Lutheran	4	–	5	4	–	6
Mississippi College	3	–	6	3	–	7
Sul Ross	2	–	7	2	–	7
Louisiana College	1	–	8	2	–	8
East Texas Baptist	1	–	8	2	–	8
$ – Conference champion; ^ – NCAA Division III playoff participant

2000 Atlantic Central Football Conference standings
	Conf.			Overall
Team	W		L	W		L
Wesley $^	6	–	0	9	–	2
Ferrum	4	–	2	6	–	4
Methodist	4	–	2	6	–	4
Salisbury State	3	–	3	5	–	5
Frostburg State	3	–	3	4	–	6
Greensboro	1	–	5	5	–	5
Chowan	0	–	6	2	–	7
$ – Conference champion; ^ – NCAA Division III playoff participant

2000 Centennial Conference football standings
	Conf.			Overall
Team	W		L	W		L
Western Maryland $^	7	–	0	10	–	2
Muhlenberg	5	–	2	9	–	2
Ursinus	5	–	2	8	–	3
Johns Hopkins	4	–	3	5	–	5
Dickinson	4	–	3	5	–	5
Swarthmore	2	–	5	4	–	5
Gettysburg	1	–	6	1	–	9
Franklin & Marshall	0	–	7	0	–	10
$ – Conference champion; ^ – NCAA Division III playoff participant

2000 College Conference of Illinois and Wisconsin football standings
	Conf.			Overall
Team	W		L	W		L
Illinois Wesleyan +	6	–	1	9	–	1
Millikin +^	6	–	1	9	–	2
Wheaton (IL) +	6	–	1	8	–	2
Augustana (IL)	4	–	3	7	–	3
North Central (IL)	3	–	4	5	–	5
Carthage	1	–	6	4	–	6
North Park	1	–	6	3	–	7
Elmhurst	1	–	6	2	–	8
+ – Conference co-champions; ^ – NCAA Division III playoff participant

2000 Freedom Football Conference standings
	Conf.			Overall
Team	W		L	W		L
Springfield (MA) $^	6	–	0	11	–	2
Western Connecticut	5	–	1	10	–	1
Norwich	3	–	3	7	–	3
Plymouth State	3	–	3	5	–	5
Merchant Marine	3	–	3	3	–	6
WPI	1	–	5	2	–	8
Coast Guard	0	–	6	2	–	8
$ – Conference champion; ^ – NCAA Division III playoff participant

2000 Heartland Collegiate Athletic Conference football standings
	Conf.			Overall
Team	W		L	W		L
Bluffton +	5	–	1	7	–	3
Hanover +^	5	–	1	8	–	4
Defiance	4	–	2	7	–	3
Anderson (IN)	3	–	3	4	–	6
Franklin (IN)	3	–	3	4	–	6
Manchester	1	–	5	2	–	8
Mount St. Joseph	0	–	6	2	–	8
+ – Conference co-champions; ^ – NCAA Division III playoff participant

2000 Illini–Badger Football Conference standings
	Conf.			Overall
Team	W		L	W		L
Aurora $^	7	–	0	7	–	4
Benedictine (IL)	6	–	1	7	–	3
Concordia (WI)	5	–	2	7	–	3
Greenville	3	–	4	6	–	5
MacMurray	3	–	4	5	–	5
Lakeland	3	–	4	4	–	6
Eureka	1	–	6	2	–	8
Concordia (IL)	0	–	7	0	–	9
$ – Conference champion; ^ – NCAA Division III playoff participant

2000 Iowa Conference football standings
	Conf.			Overall
Team	W		L	W		L
Central (IA) $^	10	–	0	12	–	1
Wartburg	9	–	1	9	–	1
Buena Vista	7	–	3	7	–	3
Coe	6	–	4	6	–	4
Simpson (IA)	6	–	4	6	–	4
Luther	5	–	5	5	–	5
Loras	4	–	6	4	–	6
Cornell (IA)	3	–	7	3	–	7
Upper Iowa	3	–	7	3	–	7
William Penn	2	–	8	2	–	8
Dubuque	0	–	10	0	–	10
$ – Conference champion; ^ – NCAA Division III playoff participant

2000 Michigan Intercollegiate Athletic Association football standings
	Conf.			Overall
Team	W		L	W		L
Hope $^	5	–	0	8	–	2
Albion	3	–	2	7	–	3
Alma	3	–	2	6	–	4
Kalamazoo	3	–	2	5	–	4
Adrian	1	–	4	2	–	8
Olivet	0	–	5	2	–	8
$ – Conference champion; ^ – NCAA Division III playoff participant

2000 Middle Atlantic Conference football standings
	Conf.			Overall
Team	W		L	W		L
Commonwealth
Widener x^	5	–	0	12	–	2
Moravian	3	–	2	6	–	4
Susquehanna	2	–	3	7	–	3
Lebanon Valley	2	–	3	4	–	6
Albright	2	–	3	3	–	7
Juniata	1	–	4	1	–	9
Freedom
Lycoming x	4	–	0	7	–	2
King's (PA)	3	–	1	7	–	4
Wilkes	2	–	2	5	–	6
Delaware Valley	1	–	3	3	–	7
Fairleigh Dickinson–Florham	0	–	4	1	–	9
x – Division champion/co-champions; ^ – NCAA Division III playoff participant

2000 Midwest Conference football standings
	Conf.			Overall
Team	W		L	W		L
St. Norbert $^	9	–	0	10	–	1
Ripon	8	–	1	9	–	1
Illinois College	5	–	4	6	–	4
Carroll (WI)	5	–	4	5	–	5
Grinnell	5	–	4	5	–	5
Beloit	3	–	6	3	–	7
Lake Forest	3	–	6	3	–	7
Monmouth (IL)	3	–	6	3	–	7
Knox	2	–	7	2	–	8
Lawrence	2	–	7	2	–	8
$ – Conference champion; ^ – NCAA Division III playoff participant

2000 Minnesota Intercollegiate Athletic Conference football standings
	Conf.					Overall
Team	W		L		T	W		L		T
Bethel (MN) $^	9	–	0	–	0	10	–	1	–	0
Saint John's (MN) ^	8	–	1	–	0	13	–	2	–	0
St. Olaf	6	–	3	–	0	7	–	3	–	0
St. Thomas (MN)	6	–	3	–	0	6	–	4	–	0
Gustavus Adolphus	6	–	3	–	0	6	–	4	–	0
Concordia–Moorhead	4	–	5	–	0	4	–	6	–	0
Augsburg	3	–	6	–	0	3	–	7	–	0
Hamline	2	–	7	–	0	2	–	8	–	0
Carleton	1	–	8	–	0	1	–	9	–	0
Macalester	0	–	9	–	0	1	–	9	–	0
$ – Conference champion; ^ – NCAA Division III playoff participant

2000 New England Football Conference standings
	Conf.			Overall
Team	W		L	W		L
Bogan Division
Worcester State x	5	–	1	7	–	2
Bridgewater State xy$^	5	–	1	8	–	3
Fitchburg State	4	–	2	5	–	4
Massachusetts Maritime	3	–	3	5	–	4
Westfield State	2	–	4	3	–	6
Framingham State	2	–	4	3	–	7
Maine Maritime	0	–	6	0	–	9
Boyd Division
Salve Regina xy	4	–	1	7	–	3
Nichols	4	–	2	7	–	3
UMass Dartmouth	4	–	2	5	–	4
Curry	3	–	3	6	–	4
MIT	3	–	3	4	–	5
Western New England	2	–	4	4	–	5
UMass–Boston	0	–	5	1	–	9
Championship: Bridgewater State 27, Salve Regina 24
$ – Conference champion; x – Division champion/co-champions; y – Championship game participant; ^ – NCAA Division III playoff participant

2000 New England Small College Athletic Conference football standings
	Conf.			Overall
Team	W		L	W		L
Amherst +	7	–	1	7	–	1
Colby +	7	–	1	7	–	1
Middlebury +	7	–	1	7	–	1
Trinity (CT)	5	–	3	5	–	3
Williams	5	–	3	5	–	3
Wesleyan	4	–	4	4	–	4
Bates	2	–	6	2	–	6
Tufts	2	–	6	2	–	6
Hamilton	1	–	7	1	–	7
Bowdoin	0	–	8	0	–	8
+ – Conference co-champions

2000 New Jersey Athletic Conference football standings
	Conf.			Overall
Team	W		L	W		L
Montclair State $^	6	–	0	7	–	3
Rowan	5	–	1	7	–	2
Cortland	4	–	2	4	–	6
TCNJ	3	–	3	4	–	5
New Jersey City	2	–	4	3	–	7
William Paterson	1	–	5	2	–	8
Kean	0	–	6	1	–	9
$ – Conference champion; ^ – NCAA Division III playoff participant

2000 Northwest Conference football standings
	Conf.			Overall
Team	W		L	W		L
Linfield $^	5	–	0	9	–	1
Pacific Lutheran ^	4	–	1	9	–	2
Whitworth	3	–	2	6	–	3
Puget Sound	2	–	3	5	–	4
Lewis & Clark	1	–	4	3	–	6
Willamette	0	–	5	3	–	7
$ – Conference champion; ^ – NCAA Division III playoff participant

2000 North Coast Athletic Conference football standings
	Conf.			Overall
Team	W		L	W		L
Wittenberg $^	7	–	0	12	–	1
Allegheny	6	–	1	7	–	3
Ohio Wesleyan	4	–	3	6	–	4
Earlham	4	–	3	6	–	4
Wooster	4	–	3	6	–	4
Hiram	2	–	5	3	–	7
Wabash	5	–	2	6	–	4
Denison	2	–	5	2	–	8
Kenyon	1	–	6	3	–	7
Oberlin	0	–	7	0	–	10
$ – Conference champion; ^ – NCAA Division III playoff participant

2000 Ohio Athletic Conference football standings
	Conf.			Overall
Team	W		L	W		L
Mount Union $^	9	–	0	14	–	0
Ohio Northern ^	8	–	1	9	–	3
Wilmington (OH)	7	–	2	7	–	3
John Carroll	6	–	3	7	–	3
Baldwin–Wallace	5	–	4	5	–	5
Muskingum	3	–	6	4	–	6
Otterbein	3	–	6	4	–	6
Capital	2	–	7	3	–	7
Marietta	2	–	7	3	–	7
Heidelberg	0	–	9	0	–	10
$ – Conference champion; ^ – NCAA Division III playoff participant

2000 Old Dominion Athletic Conference football standings
	Conf.			Overall
Team	W		L	W		L
Emory & Henry $^	5	–	1	8	–	3
Bridgewater ^	5	–	1	10	–	2
Catholic University	4	–	2	6	–	4
Washington and Lee	2	–	4	5	–	5
Hampden–Sydney	2	–	4	4	–	6
Randolph–Macon	2	–	4	3	–	7
Guilford	1	–	5	1	–	9
$ – Conference champion; ^ – NCAA Division III playoff participant

2000 Presidents' Athletic Conference football standings
	Conf.			Overall
Team	W		L	W		L
Washington & Jefferson $^	4	–	0	9	–	2
Grove City	3	–	1	6	–	4
Waynesburg	2	–	2	6	–	4
Bethany (WV)	1	–	3	5	–	5
Thiel	0	–	4	2	–	8
Westminster (PA) *	0	–	0	8	–	2
$ – Conference champion; ^ – NCAA Division III playoff participant; * Completing reclassification from NCAA Division II—games did not count in conference standings.

2000 Southern California Intercollegiate Athletic Conference football standings
	Conf.			Overall
Team	W		L	W		L
Redlands $	5	–	0	7	–	2
Whittier	4	–	1	4	–	5
Occidental	2	–	3	5	–	4
La Verne	2	–	3	2	–	7
Claremont-Mudd	1	–	4	4	–	5
Cal Lutheran	1	–	4	3	–	6
$ – Conference champion

2000 Southern Collegiate Athletic Conference football standings
	Conf.			Overall
Team	W		L	W		L
Trinity (TX) +^	4	–	2	10	–	3
DePauw +	4	–	2	6	–	4
Sewanee +	4	–	2	6	–	4
Rhodes	3	–	3	5	–	4
Centre	3	–	3	5	–	5
Millsaps	2	–	4	5	–	5
Rose–Hulman	1	–	5	2	–	8
+ – Conference co-champions; ^ – NCAA Division III playoff participant

2000 Upstate Collegiate Athletic Association football standings
	Conf.			Overall
Team	W		L	W		L
Hobart +^	3	–	1	9	–	2
Union (NY) +^	3	–	1	9	–	2
Rochester (NY) +	3	–	1	6	–	3
RPI	1	–	3	3	–	6
St. Lawrence	0	–	4	1	–	9
+ – Conference co-champions; ^ – NCAA Division III playoff participant

2000 Wisconsin Intercollegiate Athletic Conference football standings
	Conf.			Overall
Team	W		L	W		L
Wisconsin–Stout $^	7	–	0	10	–	1
Wisconsin–La Crosse	6	–	1	7	–	3
Wisconsin–River Falls	5	–	2	6	–	4
Wisconsin–Eau Claire	4	–	3	6	–	4
Wisconsin–Whitewater	3	–	4	5	–	5
Wisconsin–Oshkosh	1	–	6	3	–	7
Wisconsin–Platteville	1	–	6	2	–	8
Wisconsin–Stevens Point	1	–	6	2	–	8
$ – Conference champion; ^ – NCAA Division III playoff participant

2000 NCAA Division III independents football records
	Conf.			Overall
Team	W		L	W		L
Thomas More		–		9	–	1
Brockport		–		8	–	1
Ithaca		–		7	–	3
Buffalo State		–		7	–	4
Hartwick		–		7	–	4
Menlo		–		6	–	4
Principia		–		5	–	4
Pomona-Pitzer		–		4	–	4
Alfred		–		4	–	6
Colorado College		–		3	–	6
Maryville (TN)		–		3	–	7
Wisconsin Lutheran		–		3	–	7
Chapman		–		2	–	7
Westminster (MO)		–		2	–	8
Maranatha Baptist		–		1	–	8
Blackburn		–		1	–	9
Rockford		–		1	–	9
St. John Fisher		–		1	–	9
Mount Ida		–		0	–	8

== Conference champions ==
Conference champions
- American Southwest Conference – Hardin–Simmons
- Atlantic Central Football Conference – Wesley
- Centennial Conference – Western Maryland
- College Conference of Illinois and Wisconsin – Illinois Wesleyan, Millikin, and Wheaton (IL)
- Dixie Intercollegiate Football Conference – No Champion Named
- Freedom Football Conference – Springfield
- Heartland Collegiate Athletic Conference – Bluffton and Hanover
- Illini-Badger Football Conference – Aurora
- Iowa Intercollegiate Athletic Conference – Central (IA)
- Michigan Intercollegiate Athletic Association – Hope
- Middle Atlantic Conference – Widener
- Midwest Conference – St. Norbert
- Minnesota Intercollegiate Athletic Conference – Bethel (MN)
- New England Football Conference – Nichols and Salve Regina (Blue Division), Bridgewater State (Red Division)
  - Championship Game: Bridgewater State 27, Salve Regina 24
- New England Small College Athletic Conference – Amherst, Colby, and Middlebury
- New Jersey Athletic Conference – Montclair State
- North Coast Athletic Conference – Wittenberg
- Northwest Conference – Linfield
- Ohio Athletic Conference – Mount Union
- Old Dominion Athletic Conference – Emory & Henry
- Presidents' Athletic Conference – Washington & Jefferson
- Southern California Intercollegiate Athletic Conference – Redlands
- Southern Collegiate Athletic Conference – DePauw, Sewanee, and Trinity (TX)
- University Athletic Association – Chicago
- Upper Midwest Athletic Conference – Mount Senario
- Upstate Collegiate Athletic Conference – Hobart, Rochester, and Union (NY)
- Wisconsin Intercollegiate Athletic Conference – Wisconsin–Stout

== Postseason ==
The 2000 NCAA Division III Football Championship playoffs were the 28th annual single-elimination tournament to determine the national champion of men's NCAA Division III college football. The championship Stagg Bowl game was held at Salem Football Stadium in Salem, Virginia for the eighth time. This was the second bracket to feature 28 teams since last expanding in 1999.

=== Playoff bracket ===
First Round; Campus Sites
Ohio Northern	47
Millikin	21
Hanover	20
Hope	3
Wittenberg	31
Aurora	20
Springfield	31
Montclair State	29
Widener	33
Union (NY)	26
Hobart	25
Bridgewater State	0
Central (IA)	28
St. Norbert	14
Pacific Lutheran	41
Bethel (MN)	13
Saint John's (MN)	26
UW–Stout	19
Western Maryland	38
Emory & Henry	14
Trinity (TX)	21
Wesley	3
Bridgewater (VA)	59
Wash. & Jefferson	42

Second Round; Campus Sites
Mount Union	32
Ohio Northern	15
Hanover	21
Wittenberg	32
Brockport	6
Springfield	13
Widener	40
Hobart	14
Linfield	17
Central (IA)	20*
Pacific Lutheran	21
Saint John's (MN)	28*
Hardin–Simmons	32
Western Maryland	10
Trinity (TX)	47*
Bridgewater (VA)	41

Quarterfinals; Campus Sites
Mount Union	32
Wittenberg	21
Springfield	27
Widener	61
Central (IA)	18
Saint John's (MN)	21
Hardin–Simmons	33
Trinity (TX)	30

Semifinals; Campus Sites
Mount Union	70
Widener	30
Saint John's (MN)	38
Hardin–Simmons	14

National Championship Game; Salem Football Stadium; Salem, Virginia
Mount Union	10
Saint John's (MN)	7

* Overtime

== Final AFCA Top 25 Poll ==
Team	Final Record	Points
1. Mount Union	14-0	1,150
2. St. John's	13–2	1,104
3. Hardin-Simmons	12–1	991
4. Central(IA)	12–1	983
5. Wittenberg	12–1	974
6. Widener	12–2	876
7. Pacific Lutheran	9–2	821
8. Linfield	9–1	795
9. Wisconsin-Stout	10–1	673
10. Springfield	11–2	603
11. Western Maryland	10–2	572
12. Brockport State	8–1	564
13. Trinity(TX)	10–3	537
14. Bethel	10–1	481
15. Bridgewater	10–2	428
16. Washington & Jefferson	9–2	406
17. St. Norbert	10–1	387
18. Wartburg	9–1	362
19. Ohio Northern	9–3	354
20. Western Connecticut State	10–1	282
21. Millikin	9–2	274
22. Union	9–2	265
23. Illinois Wesleyan	9–1	251
24. Mary Hardin-Baylor	9–1	152
25. Hanover	8–4	120

Others receiving votes: Wesley, 86; Hobart, 78; Thomas More, 76; Montclair St., 74; Hope, 65; Rowan, 44; Aurora, 34; Ripon, 20; Emory & Henry, 20; Middlebury, 14; Amherst, 11; Bridgewater St., 9; Wheaton, 8; Lycoming, 4; Augustana, 2.

== Awards ==
Gagliardi Trophy: Chad Johnson, Pacific Lutheran

AFCA Coach of the Year: Larry Kehres, Mount Union

AFCA Regional Coach of the Year: Region 1: Mike DeLong, Springfield Region 2: Bill Zwaan, Widener Region 3: Pete Fredenburg, Mary Hardin-Baylor Region 4: Larry Kehres, Mount Union Region 5: Ed Meierkort, Wisconsin-Stout

== See also ==
- 2000 NCAA Division I-A football season
- 2000 NCAA Division I-AA football season
- 2000 NCAA Division II football season
