= List of NCAA Division II football seasons =

A list of NCAA Division II college football seasons since splitting away in 1973. Previously, Division II schools participated in the NCAA's College Division.

== Three Division Alignment (1973–1978) ==
Year	Champion	Harlon Hill Trophy Winner	Gene Upshaw Award Winner
1973	Louisiana Tech	—	—
1974	Central Michigan	—	—
1975	Northern Michigan	—	—
1976	Montana State	—	—
1977	Lehigh	—	—

=== Conference realignment ===
- The Southland Conference, and all of its members, moved from Division II up to Division I in 1975 but returned to Division I-AA in 1982.
- The Big Sky Conference, Mid-Eastern Athletic Conference, Ohio Valley Conference, Southwestern Athletic Conference, and Yankee Conference, and their respective members, moved from Division II into the newly founded Division I-AA in 1978.
- After forming as a league in 1980, the Association of Mid-Continent Universities, and all of its members, moved from Division II up to Division I-AA in 1982.
- The Pennsylvania State Athletic Conference, after competing as a Division III conference from 1973 to 1979, moved to Division II, along with all of its members, in 1980.

== Four Division Alignment (1978–present) ==
Year	Champion	Harlon Hill Trophy Winner	Gene Upshaw Award Winner
1978	Eastern Illinois	—	—
1979	Delaware	—	—
1980	Cal Poly	—	—
1981	Southwest Texas State	—	—
1982	Southwest Texas State (2)	—	—
1983	North Dakota State	—	—
1984	Troy State	—	—
1985	North Dakota State (2)	—	—
1986	North Dakota State (3)	Jeff Bentrim, North Dakota State (QB)	—
1987	Troy State (2)	Johnny Bailey, Texas A&M–Kingsville (RB)	—
1988	North Dakota State (4)	Johnny Bailey, Texas A&M–Kingsville (RB)	—
1989	Mississippi College†	Johnny Bailey, Texas A&M–Kingsville (RB)	—
1990	North Dakota State (5)	Chris Simdorn, North Dakota State (QB)	—
1991	Pittsburg State	Ronnie West, Pittsburg State (WR)	—
1992	Jacksonville State	Ronald Moore, Pittsburg State (RB)	—
1993	North Alabama	Roger Graham, New Haven (RB)	—
1994	North Alabama (2)	Chris Hatcher, Valdosta State (QB)	—
1995	North Alabama (3)	Ronald McKinnon, North Alabama (LB)	—
1996	Northern Colorado	Jarrett Anderson, Truman State (RB)	—
1997	Northern Colorado (2)	Irvin Sigler, Bloomsburg (RB)	—
1998	Northwest Missouri State	Brian Shay, Emporia State (RB)	—
1999	Northwest Missouri State (2)	Corte McGuffey, Northern Colorado (QB)	—
2000	Delta State	Dusty Bonner, Valdosta State (QB)	—
2001	North Dakota	Dusty Bonner, Valdosta State (QB)	—
2002	Grand Valley State	Curt Anes, Grand Valley State (QB)	—
2003	Grand Valley State (2)	Will Hall, North Alabama (QB)	—
2004	Valdosta State	Chad Friehauf, Colorado Mines (QB)	Nathan Baker, Pittsburg State (OL)
2005	Grand Valley State (3)	Jimmy Terwilliger, East Stroudsburg (QB)	Mike McFadden, Grand Valley State (DL)
2006	Grand Valley State (4)	Danny Woodhead, Chadron State (RB)	Mike McFadden, Grand Valley State (DL)
2007	Valdosta State (2)	Danny Woodhead, Chadron State (RB)	Brandon Barnes, Grand Valley State (OT)
2008	Minnesota–Duluth	Bernard Scott, Abilene Christian (RB)	Sam Collins, Abilene Christian (C)
2009	Northwest Missouri State (3)	Joique Bell, Wayne State (RB)	Ben Staggs, West Liberty (OT)
2010	Minnesota–Duluth (2)	Eric Czerniewski, Central Missouri (QB)	Brandon Fusco, Sliperry Rock (C)
2011	Pittsburg State (2)	Jonas Randolph, Mars Hill (RB)	Joe Long, Wayne State (OT)
2012	Valdosta State (3)	Zach Zulli, Shippensburg (QB)	Garth Heikkinen, Minnesota–Duluth (OG)
2013	Northwest Missouri State (4)	Franklyn Quiteh, Bloomsburg (RB)	Darius Allen, CSU Pueblo (DE)
2014	CSU Pueblo	Jason Vander Laan, Ferris State (QB)	Darius Allen, CSU Pueblo (DE)
2015	Northwest Missouri State (5)	Jason Vander Laan, Ferris State (QB)	Matthew Judon, Grand Valley State (DE)
2016	Northwest Missouri State (6)	Justin Dvorak, Colorado Mines (QB)	Jordan Morgan, Kutztown (OT)
2017	Texas A&M-Commerce	Luis Perez, Texas A&M–Commerce (QB)	Marcus Martin, Slippery Rock (DE)
2018	Valdosta State (4)	Jayru Campbell, Ferris State (QB)	Markus Jones, Angelo State (DE)
2019	West Florida	Roland Rivers III, Slippery Rock (QB)	Austin Edwards, Ferris State (DE)
2020	The season concluded with the end of the regular season, as the playoffs and championship game were not held due to the COVID-19 pandemic.		
2021	Ferris State	Tyson Bagent, Shepherd (QB)	Dylan Pasquali, Ferris State (OT)
2022	Ferris State (2)	John Matocha, Colorado Mines (QB)	Caleb Murphy, Ferris State (DE)
2023	Harding	Zach Zebrowski, Central Missouri (QB)	Levi Johnson, Colorado Mines (OT)
2024	Ferris State (3)	Zach Zebrowski, Central Missouri (QB) (2)	Marquise Fleming, Wingate (DE)
2025	Ferris State (4)	Curtis Allen, Virginia Union (RB)	Tim Anderson, Ferris State (OT)

== See also ==
- List of NCAA Division I-A/FBS football seasons
- List of NCAA Division I-AA/FCS football seasons
- List of NCAA Division III football seasons
- Harlon Hill Trophy
