= Roy Beechler =

American football player and coach (1880–1946)

- Beechler from 1902 Alma football team portrait

Biographical details
- Born: October 17, 1880; Ithaca, Michigan, U.S.
- Died: November 14, 1946 (aged 66); Clinton County, Michigan, U.S.

Playing career
- 1902: Alma
- 1904: Michigan
- Positions: Center, tackle

Coaching career (HC unless noted)
- 1905: Mount Union
- 1909: Michigan (assistant)

Head coaching record
- Overall: 2–6

LeRoy Garfield "Roy" Beechler (October 17, 1880 – November 14, 1946) was an American college football player and coach. He played football for the University of Michigan's 1904 "Point-a-Minute" team. He was the head football coach at Mount Union College in Ohio in 1905.

== Early years ==
Beechler was born in Ithaca, Michigan in October 1880 and educated in the Ithaca public schools. His parents, Jacob Sidney Beechler and Dora (Rasor) Beechler were of Dutch descent. In 1900, the family was living in Newark Township, Gratiot County, Michigan.

== University of Michigan ==
Beechler began his education at Alma College and played football for Alma's 1902 Michigan Intercollegiate Athletic Association championship football team. He later enrolled in the Department of Engineering at the University of Michigan. In 1907, he received a Bachelor of Science degree in mechanical engineering. While attending Michigan, he played football for the 1904 Michigan Wolverines football team. Beechler played at the center and tackle positions for Michigan. He suffered an injury that sidelined him for a portion of the season. The 1904 Michigan team was the fourth of Fielding H. Yost's "Point-a-Minute" teams. The team compiled a record of 10–0 and outscored its opponents 567 to 22.

== Coaching ==
After playing for Yost's "Point-a-Minute" team in 1904, Beechler was hired as the head football coach at Mount Union College for the 1905 season. He compiled a 2–6 record as the team's head coach. Beechler was referred to among the student body at Mt. Union as "our Michigan University coach."

In September 1906, Beechler was hired as coach for the Ann Arbor High School football team. Beechler also served as an assistant coach under Fielding Yost at Michigan for the 1909 Michigan Wolverines football team that compiled a 6–1 record and outscored opponents 116 to 34. At the post-season football banquet on November 23, 1909, Yost thanked his coaching staff: "Mr. Redden, Mr. Fitzpatrick, Mr. Beechler and all the others who have been with us throughout the season deserve their full share of the credit.

== Family and engineering career ==
In August 1907, Beechler was married to Margaret Willets (1882-1958) in Essex County, Ontario. They had two children, Jack Sidney Beechler (born April 26, 1910, in Detroit) and Richard Willets Beechler.

Beechler's professional career was spent with manufacturing firms in Detroit. He began his career working for the Detroit Stoker & Foundry Company. As of 1912, Beechler was employed by the Metal Products Co. in Detroit. He became the chief engineer at Metal Products Co. where spent three years and was responsible for designing axles and tools. During World War I, he tested trucks manufactured for use by the government. After Metal Products was acquired by the Timken Company, he became the manager of the former Metal Products plant and later became the assistant chief engineer at Timken's main plant. Beechler was also an inventor who had several patents registered with the U. S. Patent Office.

In January 1920, Beechler and F. C. Gilbert co-founded the Vulcan Motor Axle Co. to build a complete line of axles for automobiles. Beechler served as the company's chief engineer. At the time of the 1920 United States census, he was working as a mechanical engineer for an axle company in Detroit. He was living in Detroit with his wife Margaret and their two sons, Jack and Richard. By 1930, Beechler and his family had moved to Jackson, Michigan, where Beechler was employed as a mechanical engineer with a horn and radio corporation.

Beechler later became the owner of the Clinton Theater in St. Johns, Michigan. He died in a hospital near St. John's in November 1946 after an illness lasting three years.

== Head coaching record ==
Year	Team	Overall	Conference	Standing	Bowl/playoffs
Mount Union Purple (Independent) (1905)
1905	Mount Union	2–6			
Mount Union:		2–6			
Total:		2–6			
