= Larry Kehres =

American football coach (born 1949)

Biographical details
- Born: September 7, 1949 (age 77); Diamond, Ohio, U.S.

Playing career

Football
- 1967–1970: Mount Union
- Position: Quarterback

Coaching career (HC unless noted)

Football
- 1971–1972: Bowling Green (GA)
- 1973: Johnstown HS (OH)
- 1974–1985: Mount Union (OC)
- 1986–2012: Mount Union
- 2023: Mount Union (QB)

Swimming
- 1974–1986: Mount Union

Administrative career (AD unless noted)
- 1985–2020: Mount Union

Head coaching record
- Overall: 332–24–3 (college football); 6–4 (high school football)
- Tournaments: 77–12 (NCAA D-III playoffs)

Accomplishments and honors

Championships
- 11 NCAA Division III (1993, 1996–1998, 2000–2002, 2005–2006, 2008, 2012); 23 OAC (1986, 1990, 1992–2012)

Awards
- 9× AFCA NCAA Division III COY (1993, 1996–1998, 2000–2002, 2006, 2008); 6× OAC Coach of the Year (1986, 1990, 1992, 1994, 1996–1997)

Records
- Highest winning percentage in college football history (.929)
- College Football Hall of Fame; Inducted in 2017 (profile)

Larry Kehres (/kɛərɪs/ KAIR-iss; born September 7, 1949) is an American college football coach and college athletics administrator. He was the head football coach at Mount Union for 27 seasons from 1986 to 2012. Kehres retired from coaching in May 2013 with a record of 332–24–3 and a winning percentage of .929, the highest in college football history. Kehres also has the most national titles (11: 1993, 1996–1998, 2000–2002, 2005–2006, 2008, 2012), conference titles (23), and unbeaten regular seasons (21) of any coach in college football history. His Purple Raiders set the National Collegiate Athletic Association (NCAA) football record for most consecutive victories with 55, running from 2000 to 2003. He was succeeded as head football coach by his son, Vince. The elder Kehres was also the athletic director at Mount Union from 1985 to 2020. He was inducted into the College Football Hall of Fame in 2017.

== Early years ==
Kehres is a native of Diamond, Ohio. He attended and played quarterback for Portage County's Southeast High School, which shared the 1966 Portage County League championship with Windham High School, before attending Mount Union College from 1967 to 1970. At Mount Union, he played quarterback for the football team. In 1970, he set the school record with a 95-yard touchdown pass against Ohio Northern.

== Coaching career ==
=== Bowling Green and Johnstown-Monroe ===
From 1971 to 1972, Kehres was a graduate assistant at Bowling Green State University, while studying for a master's degree in health and physical education. In 1973, he was the head football coach at Johnstown-Monroe High School.

=== Assistant coach at Mount Union ===
In 1974, Kehres returned to Mount Union College as an assistant football coach under head coach Ken Wable. Kehres was an assistant coach and offensive coordinator for 11 years under Wable. Wable had a .564 winning percentage in 24 years as the head coach at Mount Union.

Kehres also started and served as the coach of Mount Union's swim program from 1974 to 1986.

In 2023, Kehres returned to Mount Union as the quarterbacks coach under Geoff Dartt.

=== Head coach at Mount Union ===
In 1985, Kehres became the athletic director at Mount Union. In 1986, he took over as head football coach. His teams have won 11 NCAA Division III Football Championships (1993, 1996–1998, 2000–2002, 2005–2006, 2008, 2012).

Kehres' teams hold several NCAA records. In addition to owning the two longest winning streaks in NCAA history, 54 wins in 1996–1999 and 55 wins in 2000–2003, the Mount Union Purple Raiders won a conference title in 23 of his 27 seasons; at Kehres' retirement, Mount Union had an ongoing streak of 21 conference titles. During his tenure, Kehres only lost eight games and tied three times in conference play. From 1994 to 2005, his squads won 100 consecutive games against Ohio Athletic Conference opponents. The 1994 season was the last under his tenure in which the Purple Raiders lost more than one game. Finally, his record of 72–3 (.960) in his final five seasons is the best in college football history, surpassing Tom Osborne's 60–3 (.952) in his final five seasons at Nebraska.

Kehres is 3–1 against college football's all-time winningest coach, John Gagliardi, having beaten Gagliardi's St. John's squads twice in playoff match-ups and traded wins in the national title game in 2000 and 2003.

In 2009, Kehres was named first vice president of the American Football Coaches Association (AFCA). He was elected President of the AFCA in January 2010. In 2013, Kehres retired after 27 years as head coach to become the athletic director of Mount Union. His son, defensive coordinator Vince Kehres, succeeded him as head coach.

== Family ==
Kehres and his wife, Linda, have three children, Vince, Faith, and Jan. He is also the uncle of current Gannon football head coach Erik Raeburn, who played for him from 1987 to 1990 and then served as his assistant coach for a number of years.

== Head coaching record ==
=== College football ===
Year	Team	Overall	Conference	Standing	Bowl/playoffs
Mount Union Purple Raiders (Ohio Athletic Conference) (1986–2012)
1986	Mount Union	11–1	8–0	1st	L NCAA Division III Quarterfinal
1987	Mount Union	6–4	6–2	T–2nd	
1988	Mount Union	6–3–1	5–2–1	3rd	
1989	Mount Union	7–2–1	6–1–1	2nd	
1990	Mount Union	10–1	9–0	1st	L NCAA Division III First Round
1991	Mount Union	8–1–1	7–1–1	2nd	
1992	Mount Union	12–1	9–0	1st	L NCAA Division III Semifinal
1993	Mount Union	14–0	9–0	1st	W NCAA Division III Championship
1994	Mount Union	10–2	8–1	T–1st	L NCAA Division III Quarterfinal
1995	Mount Union	12–1	9–0	1st	L NCAA Division III Semifinal
1996	Mount Union	14–0	9–0	1st	W NCAA Division III Championship
1997	Mount Union	14–0	9–0	1st	W NCAA Division III Championship
1998	Mount Union	14–0	9–0	1st	W NCAA Division III Championship
1999	Mount Union	12–1	9–0	1st	L NCAA Division III Semifinal
2000	Mount Union	14–0	9–0	1st	W NCAA Division III Championship
2001	Mount Union	14–0	9–0	1st	W NCAA Division III Championship
2002	Mount Union	14–0	9–0	1st	W NCAA Division III Championship
2003	Mount Union	13–1	9–0	1st	L NCAA Division III Championship
2004	Mount Union	12–1	9–0	1st	L NCAA Division III Semifinal
2005	Mount Union	14–1	8–1	1st	W NCAA Division III Championship
2006	Mount Union	15–0	9–0	1st	W NCAA Division III Championship
2007	Mount Union	14–1	9–0	1st	L NCAA Division III Championship
2008	Mount Union	15–0	9–0	1st	W NCAA Division III Championship
2009	Mount Union	14–1	9–0	1st	L NCAA Division III Championship
2010	Mount Union	14–1	9–0	1st	L NCAA Division III Championship
2011	Mount Union	14–1	9–0	1st	L NCAA Division III Championship
2012	Mount Union	15–0	9–0	1st	W NCAA Division III Championship
Mount Union:		332–24–3	230–8–3		
Total:		332–24–3			
National championship Conference title Conference division title or championship game berth

=== High school football ===
Year	Team	Overall	Conference	Standing	Bowl/playoffs
Johnstown Johnnies () (1973)
1973	Johnstown	6–4			
Johnstown:		6–4			
Total:		6–4			

== See also ==
- List of college football career coaching winning percentage leaders
- List of college football career coaching wins leaders
