= John M. Thorpe =

American football player and coach (1890–1956)

Biographical details
- Born: April 18, 1890; Washingtonville, Ohio, U.S.
- Died: June 7, 1956 (aged 66); Alliance, Ohio, U.S.

Playing career
- 1912–1915: Mount Union

Coaching career (HC unless noted)
- 1917: Urbana HS (OH)
- 1919–1920: Urbana HS (OH)
- 1921: Cleveland East HS (OH)
- 1922–1931: Mount Union

Administrative career (AD unless noted)
- 1922–1932: Mount Union

Head coaching record
- Overall: 55–32–7 (college)

John Moore Thorpe (April 18, 1890 – June 7, 1956) was an American college football player and coach. He served as the head football coach at Mount Union College—now known as Mount Union University—in Alliance, Ohio from 1922 to 1931, compiling a record of 55–32–7. Thorpe graduated from Leetonia High School, in Leetonia, Ohio, in 1910. He later worked as a safety service director in Alliance. He died there, on June 7, 1956, after a heart attack.

== Head coaching record ==
=== College ===
| Year | Team | Overall | Conference | Standing | Bowl/playoffs |
|---|---|---|---|---|---|
Mount Union Purple (Ohio Athletic Conference) (1922–1931)
| 1922 | Mount Union | 6–2–1 | 5–2 | 6th | |
| 1923 | Mount Union | 5–4 | 3–3 | T–8th | |
| 1924 | Mount Union | 5–4–1 | 4–3–1 | 9th | |
| 1925 | Mount Union | 7–2–1 | 4–2–1 | 6th | |
| 1926 | Mount Union | 6–3 | 5–3 | T–10th | |
| 1927 | Mount Union | 6–2–1 | 6–1–1 | T–3rd | |
| 1928 | Mount Union | 4–5 | 4–2 | 2nd | |
| 1929 | Mount Union | 5–3–1 | 4–2–1 | 7th | |
| 1930 | Mount Union | 4–5–1 | 3–3 | T–6th | |
| 1931 | Mount Union | 7–2–1 | 4–1 | 5th | |
| Mount Union: | | 55–32–7 | 42–22–4 | | |
| Total: | | 55–32–7 | | | |
