= NCAA Division III football championship =

NCAA football championship

- Current season, competition or edition: 2026 NCAA Division III football season
- Sport: American football
- Founded: 1973; 53 years ago
- First season: 1973
- Country: United States
- Most recent champion: Wisconsin–River Falls (2025)
- Most titles: Mount Union (13 titles)
- Broadcaster: ESPN
- Level on pyramid: 3
- Related competitions: Division II
- Website: ncaa.com/football/d3

The NCAA Division III football championship is an American college football tournament played annually to determine a champion at the NCAA Division III level. It was first held in 1973, as a single-elimination playoff with eight teams. Over the past 50 seasons, the number of participants has grown to 40. In 2025, 27 playoff bids went to conference champions via automatic qualification, leaving 13 places for at-large selections.

The Division III championship game, known as the Amos Alonzo Stagg Bowl or Stagg Bowl (named after football coach Amos Alonzo Stagg), was held at Shell Energy Stadium in Houston, Texas in 2024. Other Stagg Bowl sites have included Annapolis, Maryland (2022), Canton, Ohio (2021, 2025, 2027), Shenandoah, Texas (2018–2019), Salem, Virginia (1993–2017, 2023, 2026), Bradenton, Florida (1990–1992), Phenix City, Alabama (1973–1982, 1985–1989), and Kings Island, Ohio (1983–1984).

== West and East Region Championships (1969–1972) ==
The Amos Alonzo Stagg Bowl was founded by the NCAA in October 1969. Along with its counterpart, the Knute Rockne Bowl, it was "created by the NCAA ... for its College Division II schools, those 100-plus smallest schools in the NCAA." Eligible schools were divided into an East Region (the Northeast and Middle Atlantic states) and West Region (the rest of the country), with the Amos Alonzo Stagg Bowl serving as the championship of the West Region, and the Knute Rockne Bowl as the championship of the East Region.

The NCAA thus provided postseason opportunities for College Division teams too small to compete for spots in the four regional bowls it had established in 1964 (as of 1969, these were the Camellia Bowl for the West, the Pecan Bowl for the Midwest, the Grantland Rice Bowl for the Mideast, and the Boardwalk Bowl for the East). At least for the sport of football, this accommodation in 1969 foreshadowed the decision to subdivide the College Division four years later, into Division II and Division III.

=== Amos Alonzo Stagg Bowl (West Region championship) ===
Year	Date	Champion	Runner-up	Score	Location
1969	Nov 29	Wittenberg	William Jewell	27–21	Springfield, Ohio
1970	Nov 28	Capital	Luther	34–21	Columbus, Ohio
1971	Nov 26	Samford (vacated)	Ohio Wesleyan	20–10	Phenix City, Alabama
1972	Nov 24	Heidelberg	Fort Valley State	28–16	Phenix City, Alabama

=== Knute Rockne Bowl (East Region championship) ===
Year	Date	Champion	Runner-up	Score	Location
1969	Nov 29	Randolph–Macon	Bridgeport	47–28	Bridgeport, Connecticut
1970	Nov 28	Montclair State	Hampden–Sydney	7–6	Atlantic City, New Jersey
1971	Nov 26	Bridgeport	Hampden–Sydney	17–12	Atlantic City, New Jersey
1972	Nov 24	Bridgeport	Slippery Rock	27–22	Atlantic City, New Jersey

== National Championships (1973–present) ==
When the College Division was subdivided into the current Division II and Division III in 1973, the NCAA made the Amos Alonzo Stagg Bowl the Division III national championship game. Initially, Phenix City, Alabama (site of the 1971 and 1972 Stagg Bowls) continued as the host city.

=== Amos Alonzo Stagg Bowl ===
Year	Date	Champion	Runner-up	Score	Att.	Venue	City	Winn. coach
1973	Dec. 8	Wittenberg	Juniata	41–0	5,000	Garrett–Harrison Stadium	Phenix City, Alabama	Dave Maurer
1974	Dec. 7	Central (IA)	Ithaca	10–8	5,500	Garrett–Harrison Stadium	Phenix City, Alabama	Ron Schipper
1975	Dec. 6	Wittenberg	Ithaca	28–0	6,000	Garrett–Harrison Stadium	Phenix City, Alabama	Dave Maurer
1976	Dec. 4	Saint John's (MN)	Towson State	31–28	7,214	Garrett–Harrison Stadium	Phenix City, Alabama	John Gagliardi
1977	Dec. 3	Widener	Wabash	39–36	7,852	Garrett–Harrison Stadium	Phenix City, Alabama	Bill Manlove
1978	Dec. 2	Baldwin–Wallace	Wittenberg	24–10	7,500	Garrett–Harrison Stadium	Phenix City, Alabama	Lee Tressel
1979	Dec. 1	Ithaca	Wittenberg	14–10	6,500	Garrett–Harrison Stadium	Phenix City, Alabama	Jim Butterfield
1980	Dec. 6	Dayton	Ithaca	63–0	8,701	Garrett–Harrison Stadium	Phenix City, Alabama	Rick E. Carter
1981	Dec. 5	Widener	Dayton	17–10	6,100	Garrett–Harrison Stadium	Phenix City, Alabama	Bill Manlove
1982	Dec. 4	West Georgia	Augustana (IL)	14–0	9,000	Garrett–Harrison Stadium	Phenix City, Alabama	Bobby Pate
1983	Dec. 1	Augustana (IL)	Union (NY)	21–17	3,800	Galbreath Field	Kings Mills, Ohio	Bob Reade
1984	Dec. 8	Augustana (IL)	Central (IA)	21–12	2,300	Galbreath Field	Kings Mills, Ohio	Bob Reade
1985	Dec. 14	Augustana (IL)	Ithaca	20–7	1,879	Garrett–Harrison Stadium	Phenix City, Alabama	Bob Reade
1986	Dec. 13	Augustana (IL)	Salisbury State	31–3	2,000	Garrett–Harrison Stadium	Phenix City, Alabama	Bob Reade
1987	Dec. 12	Wagner	Dayton	19–3	4,000	Garrett–Harrison Stadium	Phenix City, Alabama	Walt Hameline
1988	Dec. 10	Ithaca	Central (IA)	39–24	4,000	Garrett–Harrison Stadium	Phenix City, Alabama	Jim Butterfield
1989	Dec. 9	Dayton	Union (NY)	17–7	3,500	Garrett–Harrison Stadium	Phenix City, Alabama	Mike Kelly
1990	Dec. 8	Allegheny	Lycoming	21–14 (OT)	4,800	Hawkins Stadium	Bradenton, Florida	Ken O'Keefe
1991	Dec. 14	Ithaca	Dayton	34–20	5,469	Hawkins Stadium	Bradenton, Florida	Jim Butterfield
1992	Dec. 12	Wisconsin–La Crosse	Washington & Jefferson	16–12	5,329	Hawkins Stadium	Bradenton, Florida	Roger Harring
1993	Dec. 11	Mount Union	Rowan	34–24	7,304	Salem Football Stadium	Salem, Virginia	Larry Kehres
1994	Dec. 10	Albion	Washington & Jefferson	38–15	7,168	Salem Football Stadium	Salem, Virginia	Pete Schmidt
1995	Dec. 9	Wisconsin–La Crosse	Rowan	36–7	4,905	Salem Football Stadium	Salem, Virginia	Roger Harring
1996	Dec. 14	Mount Union	Rowan	56–24	5,048	Salem Football Stadium	Salem, Virginia	Larry Kehres
1997	Dec. 13	Mount Union	Lycoming	61–12	5,777	Salem Football Stadium	Salem, Virginia	Larry Kehres
1998	Dec. 12	Mount Union	Rowan	44–24	5,145	Salem Football Stadium	Salem, Virginia	Larry Kehres
1999	Dec. 18	Pacific Lutheran	Rowan	42–13	4,101	Salem Football Stadium	Salem, Virginia	Frosty Westering
2000	Dec. 16	Mount Union	Saint John's (MN)	10–7	4,643	Salem Football Stadium	Salem, Virginia	Larry Kehres
2001	Dec. 15	Mount Union	Bridgewater	30–27	7,992	Salem Football Stadium	Salem, Virginia	Larry Kehres
2002	Dec. 21	Mount Union	Trinity (TX)	48–7	4,389	Salem Football Stadium	Salem, Virginia	Larry Kehres
2003	Dec. 20	Saint John's (MN)	Mount Union	24–6	5,073	Salem Football Stadium	Salem, Virginia	John Gagliardi
2004	Dec. 18	Linfield	Mary Hardin–Baylor	28–21	3,240	Salem Football Stadium	Salem, Virginia	Jay Locey
2005	Dec. 17	Mount Union	Wisconsin–Whitewater	35–28	4,619	Salem Football Stadium	Salem, Virginia	Larry Kehres
2006	Dec. 16	Mount Union	Wisconsin–Whitewater	35–16	6,051	Salem Football Stadium	Salem, Virginia	Larry Kehres
2007	Dec. 15	Wisconsin–Whitewater	Mount Union	31–21	5,099	Salem Football Stadium	Salem, Virginia	Lance Leipold
2008	Dec. 20	Mount Union	Wisconsin–Whitewater	31–26	5,344	Salem Football Stadium	Salem, Virginia	Larry Kehres
2009	Dec. 19	Wisconsin–Whitewater	Mount Union	38–28	3,468	Salem Football Stadium	Salem, Virginia	Lance Leipold
2010	Dec. 18	Wisconsin–Whitewater	Mount Union	31–21	4,598	Salem Football Stadium	Salem, Virginia	Lance Leipold
2011	Dec. 16	Wisconsin–Whitewater	Mount Union	13–10	3,784	Salem Football Stadium	Salem, Virginia	Lance Leipold
2012	Dec. 14	Mount Union	St. Thomas (MN)	28–10	6,027	Salem Football Stadium	Salem, Virginia	Larry Kehres
2013	Dec. 20	Wisconsin–Whitewater	Mount Union	52–14	5,371	Salem Football Stadium	Salem, Virginia	Lance Leipold
2014	Dec. 19	Wisconsin–Whitewater	Mount Union	43–34	5,465	Salem Football Stadium	Salem, Virginia	Lance Leipold
2015	Dec. 18	Mount Union	St. Thomas (MN)	49–35	5,343	Salem Football Stadium	Salem, Virginia	Vince Kehres
2016	Dec. 16	Mary Hardin–Baylor (Note: On October 10, 2019, the NCAA vacated the 2016 championship due to violations self-reported by UMHB. The appeal was unsuccessful, therefore there was no champion declared for the 2016 season. In late June 2020, UMHB's 2016 and 2017 seasons' wins and records were also vacated.)	Wisconsin–Oshkosh	10–7	3,476	Salem Football Stadium	Salem, Virginia	Pete Fredenburg
2017	Dec. 15	Mount Union	Mary Hardin–Baylor	12–0	4,971	Salem Football Stadium	Salem, Virginia	Vince Kehres
2018	Dec. 14	Mary Hardin–Baylor	Mount Union	24–16	6,816	Woodforest Bank Stadium	Shenandoah, Texas	Pete Fredenburg
2019	Dec. 20	North Central (IL)	Wisconsin–Whitewater	41–14	1,362	Woodforest Bank Stadium	Shenandoah, Texas	Jeff Thorne
2020	Canceled due to the COVID-19 pandemic							
2021	Dec. 17	Mary Hardin–Baylor	North Central (IL)	57–24	1,830	Tom Benson Hall of Fame Stadium	Canton, Ohio	Pete Fredenburg
2022	Dec. 16	North Central (IL)	Mount Union	28–21	3,231	Navy–Marine Corps Memorial Stadium	Annapolis, Maryland	Brad Spencer
2023	Dec. 15	Cortland	North Central (IL)	38–37	3,381	Salem Football Stadium	Salem, Virginia	Curt Fitzpatrick
2024	Jan. 5	North Central (IL)	Mount Union	41–25	1,938	Shell Energy Stadium	Houston, Texas	Brad Spencer
2025	Jan. 4	Wisconsin–River Falls	North Central (IL)	24–14	2,403	Tom Benson Hall of Fame Stadium	Canton, Ohio	Matt Walker
2026						Salem Football Stadium	Salem, Virginia	
2027						Tom Benson Hall of Fame Stadium	Canton, Ohio	

== National championships by team ==
National championships among active programs: 13, 6, 4, 3, 2, 1

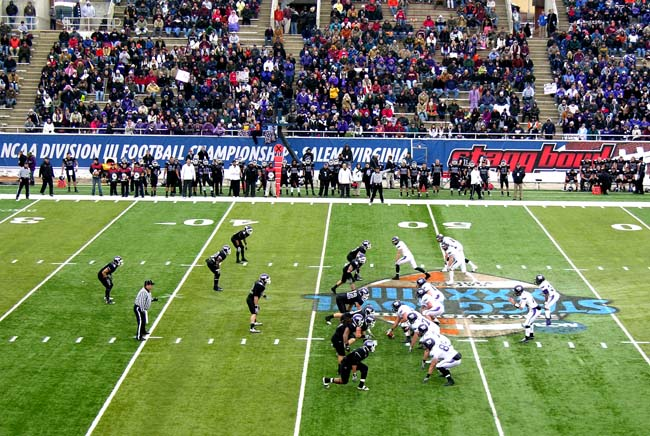
50-yard line action at the 2010 Stagg Bowl

=== Active programs ===
Team	Titles	Years
Mount Union	13	1993, 1996, 1997, 1998, 2000, 2001, 2002, 2005, 2006, 2008, 2012, 2015, 2017
Wisconsin–Whitewater	6	2007, 2009, 2010, 2011, 2013, 2014
Augustana (IL)	4	1983, 1984, 1985, 1986
Ithaca	3	1979, 1988, 1991
North Central (IL)	3	2019, 2022, 2024
Mary Hardin–Baylor	2	2016 (Note: On October 10, 2019, the NCAA vacated the 2016 championship due to violations self-reported by Mary Hardin–Baylor. The appeal was unsuccessful, therefore there was no champion declared for the 2016 season. Mary Hardin–Baylor also had its wins and records from that season and in 2017 vacated.), 2018, 2021
Saint John's (MN)	2	1976, 2003
Wisconsin–La Crosse	2	1992, 1995
Widener	2	1977, 1981
Wittenberg	2	1973, 1975
Wisconsin–River Falls	1	2025
Cortland	1	2023
Linfield	1	2004
Pacific Lutheran	1	1999
Albion	1	1994
Allegheny	1	1990
Baldwin Wallace	1	1978
Central (IA)	1	1974

=== Former programs ===
Team	Titles	Years
Dayton	2	1980, 1989
Wagner	1	1987
West Georgia	1	1982

== Championship game appearances ==
Key

- Programs that no longer compete in Division III are indicated in italics
- As of the 2025 season, all of the programs that no longer compete in D-III compete in Division I FCS. West Georgia is the most recent of these to move to FCS, with the 2024 season being its first at that level.

Team	App.	Years
Mount Union	23	1993, 1996, 1997, 1998, 2000, 2001, 2002, 2003, 2005, 2006, 2007, 2008, 2009, 2010, 2011, 2012, 2013, 2014, 2015, 2017, 2018, 2022, 2024
Wisconsin–Whitewater	10	2005, 2006, 2007, 2008, 2009, 2010, 2011, 2013, 2014, 2019
Ithaca	7	1974, 1975, 1979, 1980, 1985, 1988, 1991
North Central (IL)	6	2019, 2021, 2022, 2023, 2024, 2025
Augustana (IL)	5	1982, 1983, 1984, 1985, 1986
Dayton	5	1980, 1981, 1987, 1989, 1991
Rowan	5	1993, 1995, 1996, 1998, 1999
Mary Hardin–Baylor	4	2004, 2016§, 2017, 2018, 2021
Wittenberg	4	1973, 1975, 1978, 1979
Saint John's (MN)	3	1976, 2001, 2003
Central (IA)	3	1974, 1984, 1988
Wisconsin–La Crosse	2	1992, 1995
Widener	2	1977, 1981
St. Thomas (MN)	2	2012, 2015
Lycoming	2	1990, 1997
Washington & Jefferson	2	1992, 1994
Union (NY)	2	1983, 1989
Wisconsin–River Falls	1	2025
Cortland	1	2023
Linfield	1	2004
Pacific Lutheran	1	1999
Albion	1	1994
Allegheny	1	1990
Wagner	1	1987
West Georgia	1	1982
Baldwin Wallace	1	1978
Wisconsin–Oshkosh	1	2016
Trinity (TX)	1	2002
Bridgewater (VA)	1	2001
Salisbury State	1	1986
Wabash	1	1977
Towson State	1	1976
Juniata	1	1973

== Stagg Bowl Most Outstanding Player Award ==
As voted by the media at the game since 2000.

Year	Player	Team	Class	Pos.
2000	Chuck Moore	Mount Union	Senior	RB
2001	Chuck Moore	Mount Union	5th year Senior	RB
2002	Dan Pugh	Mount Union	Senior	RB
2003	Blake Elliot	Saint John's (MN)	Senior	WR
2004	Riley Jenkins	Linfield	Senior	RB
2005	Nate Kmic	Mount Union	Freshman	RB
2006	Greg Micheli	Mount Union	Sophomore	QB
2007	Justin Beaver	Wisconsin–Whitewater	Senior	RB
2008	Greg Micheli	Mount Union	Senior	QB
2009	Levell Coppage	Wisconsin–Whitewater	Sophomore	RB
2010	Levell Coppage	Wisconsin–Whitewater	Junior	RB
2011	Loussaint Minett	Wisconsin–Whitewater	Sophomore	DE
2012	Kevin Burke	Mount Union	Sophomore	QB
2013	Matt Behrendt	Wisconsin–Whitewater	Junior	QB
2014	Matt Behrendt	Wisconsin–Whitewater	Senior	QB
2015	Taurice Scott	Mount Union	Senior	QB
2016	Blake Jackson	Mary Hardin-Baylor	Senior	QB
2017	Nick Brish	Mount Union	Sophomore	DB
2018	T.J. Josey	Mary Hardin–Baylor	Senior	WR
2019	Ethan Greenfield	North Central	Sophomore	RB
2021	Micah Hackett	Mary Hardin–Baylor	Senior	LB
2022	Ethan Greenfield	North Central	Senior	RB
2023	Zac Boyes	Cortland	Junior	QB
2024	Luke Lehnen	North Central	Senior	QB
2025	Kaleb Blaha	Wisconsin–River Falls	Senior	QB
