= 2008 Mount Union Purple Raiders football team =

American college football season

2008 Mount Union Purple Raiders football

NCAA Division III champion OAC champion

Stagg Bowl, W 31–26 vs. Wisconsin–Whitewater
- Conference: Ohio Athletic Conference

Ranking
- D3Football.com: No. 1
- Record: 15–0 (9–0 OAC)
- Head coach: Larry Kehres (23rd season)
- Offensive coordinator: Jason Candle (2nd season)
- Defensive coordinator: Vince Kehres (4th season)
- Home stadium: Mount Union Stadium

2008 Ohio Athletic Conference football standings
	Conf.			Overall
Team	W		L	W		L
No. 1 Mount Union $^	9	–	0	15	–	0
No. 19 Otterbein ^	8	–	1	9	–	2
Baldwin–Wallace	5	–	4	5	–	5
Ohio Northern	5	–	4	5	–	5
Capital	4	–	5	5	–	5
John Carroll	4	–	5	5	–	5
Wilmington (OH)	4	–	5	4	–	6
Heidelberg	3	–	6	4	–	6
Muskingum	2	–	7	3	–	7
Marietta	1	–	8	2	–	8
$ – Conference champion; ^ – NCAA Division III playoff participant; Rankings from D3football.com

The 2008 Mount Union Purple Raiders football team was an American football team that represented the University of Mount Union in the Ohio Athletic Conference (OAC) during the 2008 NCAA Division III football season. In their 23rd year under head coach Larry Kehres, the Purple Raiders compiled a perfect 15–0 record, won the OAC championship, advanced to the NCAA Division III playoffs, and defeated Wisconsin–Whitewater, 31–26, in the national championship game.

During the course of the season, senior tailback Nate Kmic became the all-time rushing leader in college football history. He concluded his collegiate career with 8,074 rushing yards and 130 touchdowns.

The team played its home games at Mount Union Stadium in Alliance, Ohio.

== Schedule ==
Date	Opponent	Site	Result	Attendance	Source
September 6	St. John Fisher*	Mount Union Stadium; Alliance, OH	W 33–3	4,872	
September 20	Ohio Northern	Mount Union Stadium; Alliance, OH	W 44–7	7,232	
September 27	at Muskingum	McConagha Stadium; New Concord, OH	W 51–13	2,350	
October 4	at Baldwin–Wallace	Finnie Stadium; Berea, OH	W 48–3	7,107	
October 11	Capital	Mount Union Stadium; Alliance, OH	W 49–7	4,231	
October 18	Heidelberg	Mount Union Stadium; Alliance, OH	W 49–0	4,022	
October 25	at Wilmington (OH)	Williams Stadium; Wilmington, OH	W 55–0	1,896	
November 1	John Carroll	Mount Union Stadium; Alliance, OH	W 41–7	5,372	
November 8	at Otterbein	Memorial Stadium; Westerville, OH	W 49–20	4,514	
November 15	at Marietta	Don Drumm Stadium; Marietta, OH	W 49–0	577	
November 22	Randolph-Macon*	Mount Union Stadium; Alliance, OH (NCAA Division III first round)	W 56–0	1,469	
November 29	Hobart*	Mount Union Stadium; Alliance, OH (NCAA Division III second round)	W 42–7	2,592	
December 6	Cortland State*	Mount Union Stadium; Alliance, OH (NCAA Division III quarterfinal)	W 41–14	1,869	
December 13	Wheaton (IL)*	Mount Union Stadium; Alliance, OH (NCAA Division III semifinal)	W 45–24	2,472	
December 20	vs. Wisconsin–Whitewater*	Salem Football Stadium; Salem, VA (Stagg Bowl)	W 31–26	5,344	
*Non-conference game
