= 1997 Mount Union Purple Raiders football team =

American college football season

1997 Mount Union Purple Raiders football

NCAA Division III champion OAC champion

Stagg Bowl, W 61–12 vs. Lycoming
- Conference: Ohio Athletic Conference
- Record: 14–0 (9–0 OAC)
- Head coach: Larry Kehres (12th season)
- Home stadium: Mount Union Stadium

1997 Ohio Athletic Conference football standings
	Conf.			Overall
Team	W		L	W		L
Mount Union $^	9	–	0	14	–	0
John Carroll ^	8	–	1	10	–	2
Ohio Northern	7	–	2	8	–	2
Baldwin–Wallace	6	–	3	7	–	3
Heidelberg	5	–	4	5	–	5
Marietta	3	–	6	4	–	6
Capital	2	–	7	3	–	7
Muskingum	2	–	7	2	–	8
Otterbein	2	–	7	2	–	8
Hiram	1	–	8	2	–	8
$ – Conference champion; ^ – NCAA Division III playoff participant

The 1997 Mount Union Purple Raiders football team was an American football team that represented the University of Mount Union in the Ohio Athletic Conference (OAC) during the 1997 NCAA Division III football season. In their 12th year under head coach Larry Kehres, the Purple Raiders compiled a perfect 14–0 record, won the OAC championship, and outscored opponents by a total of 752 to 112. They qualified for the NCAA Division III playoffs and advanced to the national championship game, defeating Lycoming.

Mount Union's 1997 season was part of a record 54-game winning streak that spanned four seasons, commencing on September 14, 1996, and continuing through December 6, 1998.

The team played its home games at Mount Union Stadium in Alliance, Ohio.

== Schedule ==
Date	Opponent	Site	Result	Attendance	Source
September 13	Defiance*	Mount Union Stadium; Alliance, OH	W 58–0		
September 20	at Baldwin–Wallace	Berea, OH	W 56–14		
September 27	at Otterbein	Westerville, OH	W 49–0	4,470	
October 4	Ohio Northern	Mount Union Stadium; Alliance, OH	W 38–14		
October 11	at Heidelberg	Tiffin, OH	W 48–7	1,614	
October 18	John Carroll	Mount Union Stadium; Alliance, OH	W 42–14	3,008	
October 25	Muskingum	Mount Union Stadium; Alliance, OH	W 59–0		
November 1	at Marietta	Marietta, OH	W 69–7		
November 8	at Capital	Columbus, OH	W 62–0	781	
November 15	Hiram	Mount Union Stadium; Alliance, OH	W 63–0		
November 22	Allegheny*	Mount Union Stadium; Alliance, OH (NCAA Division III first round)	W 34–30	2,395	
November 29	John Carroll*	Mount Union Stadium; Alliance, OH (NCAA Division III quarterfinal)	W 59–7	4,027	
December 6	Simpson*	Mount Union Stadium; Alliance, OH (NCAA Division III semifinal)	W 54–7		
December 13	vs. Lycoming*	Salem Football Stadium; Salem, VA (Stagg Bowl)	W 61–12	5,777	
*Non-conference game
