= 2006 Mount Union Purple Raiders football team =

American college football season

2006 Mount Union Purple Raiders football

NCAA Division III champion OAC champion

Stagg Bowl, W 35–16 vs. Wisconsin–Whitewater
- Conference: Ohio Athletic Conference

Ranking
- D3Football.com: No. 1
- Record: 15–0 (9–0 OAC)
- Head coach: Larry Kehres (21st season)
- Offensive coordinator: Matt Campbell (2nd season)
- Defensive coordinator: Vince Kehres (2nd season)
- Home stadium: Mount Union Stadium

2006 Ohio Athletic Conference football standings
	Conf.			Overall
Team	W		L	W		L
No. 1 Mount Union $^	9	–	0	15	–	0
No. 3 Capital ^	8	–	1	11	–	2
Baldwin–Wallace	6	–	3	7	–	3
Marietta	5	–	4	6	–	4
Ohio Northern	5	–	4	6	–	4
John Carroll	5	–	4	5	–	5
Otterbein	3	–	6	4	–	6
Wilmington (OH)	3	–	6	3	–	7
Muskingum	1	–	8	2	–	8
Heidelberg	0	–	9	0	–	10
$ – Conference champion; ^ – NCAA Division III playoff participant; Rankings from D3football.com

The 2006 Mount Union Purple Raiders football team was an American football team that represented the University of Mount Union in the Ohio Athletic Conference (OAC) during the 2006 NCAA Division III football season. In their 21st year under head coach Larry Kehres, the Purple Raiders compiled a perfect 15–0 record, won the OAC championship, advanced to the NCAA Division III playoffs, and defeated Wisconsin–Whitewater, 35–16, in the national championship game.

Sophomore tailback Nate Kmic led the team with 2,365 rushing yards and 26 rushing touchdowns. By the conclusion of his senior season, Kmic became the all-time leading rusher in college football history.

The team played its home games at Mount Union Stadium in Alliance, Ohio.

== Schedule ==
Date	Opponent	Site	Result	Attendance	Source
September 2	at Averett*	Owen-Fulton Field; Danville, VA	W 64–7	3,782	
September 16	at Otterbein	Memorial Stadium; Westerville, OH	W 71–14	3,317	
September 23	at Muskingum	McConagha Stadium; New Concord, OH	W 62–0	1,894	
October 1	Heidelberg	Mount Union Stadium; Alliance, OH	W 58–0	3,832	
October 7	Ohio Northern	Mount Union Stadium; Alliance, OH	W 49–7	6,832	
October 14	at Wilmington (OH)	Williams Stadium; Wilmington, OH	W 65–9	3,967	
October 21	at Baldwin–Wallace	Finnie Stadium; Berea, OH	W 14–0	6,121	
October 28	Capital	Mount Union Stadium; Alliance, OH	W 38–12	4,132	
November 4	John Carroll	Mount Union Stadium; Alliance, OH	W 31–14	4,572	
November 11	at Marietta	Don Drumm Stadium; Marietta, OH	W 45–17	975	
November 18	Hope*	Mount Union Stadium; Alliance, OH (NCAA Division III first round)	W 49–0	1,624	
November 25	Wheaton*	Mount Union Stadium; Alliance, OH (NCAA Division III second round)	W 35–3	3,124	
December 2	Capital*	Mount Union Stadium; Alliance, OH (NCAA Division III quarterfinal)	W 17–14	2,817	
December 9	St. John Fisher*	Mount Union Stadium; Alliance, OH (NCAA Division III semifinal)	W 26–14	3,532	
December 16	vs. Wisconsin–Whitewater*	Salem Football Stadium; Salem, VA (Stagg Bowl)	W 35–16	6,051	
*Non-conference game
