= 2005 Mount Union Purple Raiders football team =

American college football season

2005 Mount Union Purple Raiders football

NCAA Division III champion OAC champion

Stagg Bowl, W 35–28 vs. Wisconsin–Whitewater
- Conference: Ohio Athletic Conference
- Record: 14–1 (8–1 OAC)
- Head coach: Larry Kehres (20th season)
- Offensive coordinator: Matt Campbell (1st season)
- Defensive coordinator: Vince Kehres (1st season)
- Home stadium: Mount Union Stadium

2005 Ohio Athletic Conference football standings
	Conf.			Overall
Team	W		L	W		L
No. 1 Mount Union $^	8	–	1	14	–	1
No. 18 Ohio Northern	7	–	2	8	–	2
No. 5 Capital ^	7	–	2	10	–	3
John Carroll	6	–	3	7	–	3
Otterbein	6	–	3	7	–	3
Marietta	4	–	5	5	–	5
Baldwin–Wallace	3	–	6	4	–	6
Muskingum	2	–	7	2	–	8
Wilmington (OH)	2	–	7	2	–	8
Heidelberg	0	–	9	0	–	10
$ – Conference champion; ^ – NCAA Division III playoff participant; Rankings from D3football.com

The 2005 Mount Union Purple Raiders football team was an American football team that represented the University of Mount Union in the Ohio Athletic Conference (OAC) during the 2005 NCAA Division III football season. In their 20th year under head coach Larry Kehres, the Purple Raiders compiled a 14–1 record, won the OAC championship, advanced to the NCAA Division III playoffs, and defeated Wisconsin–Whitewater, 35–28, in the Stagg Bowl to win the Division III national championship.

The team played its home games at Mount Union Stadium in Alliance, Ohio.

== Schedule ==
Date	Opponent	Site	Result	Attendance	Source
September 3	Washington University	Mount Union Stadium; Alliance, OH	W 33–7	3,236	
September 17	at John Carroll	Don Shula Stadium; Cleveland, OH	W 70–0	3,650	
September 24	Otterbein	Mount Union Stadium; Alliance, OH	W 55–7	4,013	
October 1	Capital	Mount Union Stadium; Alliance, OH	W 42–24	5,122	
October 8	at Wilmington	Williams Stadium; Wilmington, OH	W 41–6	2,327	
October 15	at Marietta	Don Drumm Stadium; Marietta, OH	W 59–7	859	
October 22	Ohio Northern	Mount Union Stadium; Alliance, OH	L 14–21	3,369	
October 29	Baldwin Wallace	Mount Union Stadium; Alliance, OH	W 17–3	5,672	
November 5	at Muskingum	McConagha Stadium; New Concord, OH	W 45–0	1,472	
November 12	at Heidelberg	Frost-Kalnow Stadium; Tiffin, OH	W 63–0	2,022	
November 19	Mt. St. Joseph	Mount Union Stadium; Alliance, OH	W 49–6	2,576	
November 26	Augustana (IL)	Mount Union Stadium; Alliance, OH	W 44–7	2,637	
December 3	Capital	Mount Union Stadium; Alliance, OH	W 34–31	4,209	
December 10	Rowan	Mount Union Stadium; Alliance, OH	W 19–7	3,236	
December 17	vs. Wisconsin-Whitewater	Salem Football Stadium; Salem, VA (Stagg Bowl)	W 35–28	4,619	
