= 2012 Mount Union Purple Raiders football team =

American college football season

2012 Mount Union Purple Raiders football

NCAA Division III champion OAC champion

Stagg Bowl, W 28–10 vs. St. Thomas (MN)
- Conference: Ohio Athletic Conference

Ranking
- D3Football.com: No. 1
- Record: 15–0 (9–0 OAC)
- Head coach: Larry Kehres (27th season)
- Offensive coordinator: Zac Bruney (4th season)
- Defensive coordinator: Vince Kehres (8th season)
- Home stadium: Mount Union Stadium

2012 Ohio Athletic Conference football standings
| | Conf. | | | Overall |
| Team | W | | L | W | | L |
|---|---|---|---|---|---|---|
| No. 1 Mount Union $^ | 9 | – | 0 | 15 | – | 0 |
| No. 19 Heidelberg ^ | 8 | – | 1 | 9 | – | 2 |
| Otterbein | 7 | – | 2 | 8 | – | 2 |
| Baldwin Wallace | 6 | – | 3 | 7 | – | 3 |
| John Carroll | 5 | – | 4 | 6 | – | 4 |
| Ohio Northern | 4 | – | 5 | 4 | – | 6 |
| Muskingum | 3 | – | 6 | 3 | – | 7 |
| Capital | 2 | – | 7 | 2 | – | 8 |
| Wilmington (OH) | 1 | – | 8 | 1 | – | 9 |
| Marietta | 0 | – | 9 | 0 | – | 10 |
$ – Conference champion; ^ – NCAA Division III playoff participant; Rankings from D3football.com

The 2012 Mount Union Purple Raiders football team was an American football team that represented the University of Mount Union in the Ohio Athletic Conference (OAC) during the 2012 NCAA Division III football season. In their 27th year under head coach Larry Kehres, the Purple Raiders compiled a perfect 15–0 record, won the OAC championship, advanced to the NCAA Division III playoffs, and defeated St. Thomas (MN), 28–10, in the national championship game.

The team played its home games at Mount Union Stadium in Alliance, Ohio.

== Schedule ==
| Date | Opponent | Site | Result | Attendance | Source |
|---|---|---|---|---|---|
| September 8 | at Franklin* | Faught Stadium; Franklin, IN | W 45–7 | 2,600 | |
| September 15 | Muskingum | Mount Union Stadium; Alliance, OH | W 57–0 | 6,074 | |
| September 22 | at Marietta | Don Drumm Stadium; Marietta, OH | W 52–0 | 1,389 | |
| September 29 | Ohio Northern | Mount Union Stadium; Alliance, OH | W 54–0 | 4,082 | |
| October 6 | at Wilmington (OH) | Williams Stadium; Wilmington, OH | W 66–0 | 1,053 | |
| October 13 | Capital | Mount Union Stadium; Alliance, OH | W 62–0 | 4,122 | |
| October 20 | at Otterbein | Memorial Stadium; Westerville, OH | W 51–0 | 2,178 | |
| October 27 | Heidelberg | Mount Union Stadium; Alliance, OH | W 33–14 | 3,211 | |
| November 3 | at Baldwin Wallace | George Finnie; Berea, OH | W 38–7 | 5,527 | |
| November 10 | at John Carroll | Don Shula Stadium; University Heights, OH | W 59–17 | 2,208 | |
| November 17 | Christopher Newport* | Mount Union Stadium; Alliance, OH (NCAA Division III first round) | W 72–14 | 1,927 | |
| November 24 | Johns Hopkins* | Mount Union Stadium; Alliance, OH (NCAA Division III second round) | W 55–13 | 1,458 | |
| December 1 | Widener* | Mount Union Stadium; Alliance, OH (NCAA Division III quarterfinal) | W 72–17 | 2,273 | |
| December 8 | Mary Hardin–Baylor* | Mount Union Stadium; Alliance, OH (NCAA Division III semifinal) | W 48–35 | 3,225 | |
| December 14 | vs. St. Thomas (MN)* | Salem Football Stadium; Salem, VA (Stagg Bowl) | W 28–10 | 6,027 | |
*Non-conference game
