= 2001 Mount Union Purple Raiders football team =

American college football season

2001 Mount Union Purple Raiders football

NCAA Division III champion OAC champion

Stagg Bowl, W 30–27 vs. Bridgewater
- Conference: Ohio Athletic Conference
- Record: 14–0 (9–0 OAC)
- Head coach: Larry Kehres (16th season)
- Home stadium: Mount Union Stadium

2001 Ohio Athletic Conference football standings
| | Conf. | | | Overall |
| Team | W | | L | W | | L |
|---|---|---|---|---|---|---|
| Mount Union $^ | 9 | – | 0 | 14 | – | 0 |
| Ohio Northern | 8 | – | 1 | 8 | – | 2 |
| Capital | 6 | – | 3 | 7 | – | 3 |
| John Carroll | 6 | – | 3 | 7 | – | 3 |
| Baldwin–Wallace | 5 | – | 4 | 5 | – | 5 |
| Wilmington (OH) | 4 | – | 5 | 5 | – | 5 |
| Otterbein | 3 | – | 6 | 4 | – | 6 |
| Muskingum | 2 | – | 7 | 3 | – | 7 |
| Marietta | 1 | – | 8 | 2 | – | 8 |
| Heidelberg | 1 | – | 8 | 1 | – | 9 |
$ – Conference champion; ^ – NCAA Division III playoff participant

The 2001 Mount Union Purple Raiders football team was an American football team that represented the University of Mount Union in the Ohio Athletic Conference (OAC) during the 2001 NCAA Division III football season. In their 16th year under head coach Larry Kehres, the Purple Raiders compiled a perfect 14–0 record, won the OAC championship, and outscored opponents by a total of 582 to 155. They qualified for the NCAA Division III playoffs and advanced to the national championship team, defeating the Bridgewater Eagles, 30–27.

The team played its home games at Mount Union Stadium in Alliance, Ohio.

== Schedule ==
| Date | Opponent | Site | Result | Attendance | Source |
|---|---|---|---|---|---|
| September 1 | Allegheny* | Mount Union Stadium; Alliance, OH | W 52–7 | 4,832 | |
| September 15 | Otterbein | Mount Union Stadium; Alliance, OH | W 48–10 | 4,132 | |
| September 22 | at John Carroll | Bedford High School Stadium; Bedford, OH | W 33–30 | 8,800 | |
| September 29 | Ohio Northern | Mount Union Stadium; Alliance, OH | W 31–3 | 5,023 | |
| October 6 | at Marietta | Don Drumm Stadium; Marietta, Ohio | W 47–0 | | |
| October 13 | at Wilmington (OH) | Williams Stadium; Wilmington, OH | W 54–6 | | |
| October 20 | Capital | Mount Union Stadium; Alliance, OH | W 52–13 | 4,089 | |
| October 27 | at Muskingum | McConagha Stadium; New Concord, OH | W 48–7 | | |
| November 3 | Baldwin–Wallace | Mount Union Stadium; Alliance, OH | W 17–3 | 6,783 | |
| November 10 | at Heidelberg | Frost-Kalnow Stadium; Tiffin, OH | W 54–7 | | |
| November 24 | Augustana* | Mount Union Stadium; Alliance, OH (NCAA Division III first round) | W 32–7 | 3,362 | |
| December 1 | Wittenberg* | Mount Union Stadium; Alliance, OH (NCAA Division III second round) | W 49–21 | 5,893 | |
| December 8 | St. John's (MN)* | Mount Union Stadium; Alliance, OH (NCAA Division III semifinal) | W 35–14 | 4,654 | |
| December 15 | vs. Bridgewater* | Salem Football Stadium; Salem, VA (Stagg Bowl) | W 30–27 | 7,992 | |
*Non-conference game
