= 2000 Mount Union Purple Raiders football team =

American college football season

2000 Mount Union Purple Raiders football

NCAA Division III champion OAC champion

Stagg Bowl, W 10–7 vs. St. John's (MN)
- Conference: Ohio Athletic Conference
- Record: 14–0 (9–0 OAC)
- Head coach: Larry Kehres (15th season)
- Home stadium: Mount Union Stadium

2000 Ohio Athletic Conference football standings
	Conf.			Overall
Team	W		L	W		L
Mount Union $^	9	–	0	14	–	0
Ohio Northern ^	8	–	1	9	–	3
Wilmington (OH)	7	–	2	7	–	3
John Carroll	6	–	3	7	–	3
Baldwin–Wallace	5	–	4	5	–	5
Muskingum	3	–	6	4	–	6
Otterbein	3	–	6	4	–	6
Capital	2	–	7	3	–	7
Marietta	2	–	7	3	–	7
Heidelberg	0	–	9	0	–	10
$ – Conference champion; ^ – NCAA Division III playoff participant

The 2000 Mount Union Purple Raiders football team was an American football team that represented the University of Mount Union in the Ohio Athletic Conference (OAC) during the 2000 NCAA Division III football season. In their 15th year under head coach Larry Kehres, the Purple Raiders compiled a perfect 14–0 record, won the OAC championship, and outscored opponents by a total of 662 to 222. They qualified for the NCAA Division III playoffs and advanced to the national championship team, defeating the St. John's (MN) Johnnies, 10–7.

The team played its home games at Mount Union Stadium in Alliance, Ohio.

== Schedule ==
Date	Opponent	Site	Result	Attendance	Source
September 2	at Allegheny*	Meadville, PA	W 48–21	3,116	
September 16	at Otterbein	Westerville, OH	W 37–14	3,114	
September 23	John Carroll	Mount Union Stadium; Alliance, OH	W 41–31	7,053	
September 30	at Ohio Northern	Ada War Memorial Stadium; Ada, OH	W 48–24	4,611	
October 7	Marietta	Mount Union Stadium; Alliance, OH	W 54–14	3,013	
October 14	Wilmington	Mount Union Stadium; Alliance, OH	W 42–7	4,372	
October 21	at Capital	Whitehall-Yearling High School; Columbus, OH	W 58–17		
October 28	Muskingum	Mount Union Stadium; Alliance, OH	W 62–7	4,023	
November 4	at Baldwin–Wallace	Finnie Stadium; Berea, OH	W 41–0	7,550	
November 11	Heidelberg	Mount Union Stadium; Alliance, OH	W 60–7	3,723	
November 25	Ohio Northern*	Mount Union Stadium; Alliance, OH (NCAA Division III first round)	W 59–28	3,862	
December 2	Wittenberg*	Mount Union Stadium; Alliance, OH (NCAA Division III quarterfinal)	W 32–15	4,736	
December 9	Widener*	Mount Union Stadium; Alliance, OH (NCAA Division III semifinal)	W 70–30	4,537	
December 16	vs. St. John's (MN)*	Salem Football Stadium; Salem, VA (Stagg Bowl)	W 10–7	4,643	
*Non-conference game
