= 2002 Mount Union Purple Raiders football team =

American college football season

2002 Mount Union Purple Raiders football

NCAA Division III champion OAC champion

Stagg Bowl, W 48–7 vs. Trinity (TX)
- Conference: Ohio Athletic Conference
- Record: 14–0 (9–0 OAC)
- Head coach: Larry Kehres (17th season)
- Home stadium: Mount Union Stadium

2002 Ohio Athletic Conference football standings
	Conf.			Overall
Team	W		L	W		L
Mount Union $^	9	–	0	14	–	0
John Carroll ^	8	–	1	12	–	2
Baldwin–Wallace	7	–	2	8	–	2
Capital	6	–	3	6	–	4
Ohio Northern	5	–	4	5	–	5
Muskingum	3	–	6	3	–	7
Marietta	2	–	7	3	–	7
Wilmington (OH)	2	–	7	3	–	7
Heidelberg	2	–	7	2	–	8
Otterbein	1	–	8	2	–	8
$ – Conference champion; ^ – NCAA Division III playoff participant

The 2002 Mount Union Purple Raiders football team was an American football team that represented the University of Mount Union in the Ohio Athletic Conference (OAC) during the 2002 NCAA Division III football season. In their 17th year under head coach Larry Kehres, the Purple Raiders compiled a perfect 14–0 record, won the OAC championship, and outscored opponents by a total of 654 to 180. They qualified for the NCAA Division III playoffs and advanced to the national championship team, defeating Trinity (TX), 48–7.

The team played its home games at Mount Union Stadium in Alliance, Ohio.

== Schedule ==
Date	Opponent	Site	Result	Attendance	Source
September 7	at Wisconsin-Whitewater*	Perkins Stadium; Whitewater, WI	W 44–21	4,030	
September 21	at Baldwin–Wallace	George Fannie Stadium; Berea, OH	W 28–21	9,127	
September 28	Muskingum	Mount Union Stadium; Alliance, OH	W 49–3	6,232	
October 5	at Otterbein	Westerville, OH	W 55–0	4,126	
October 12	Heidelberg	Mount Union Stadium; Alliance, OH	W 61–0	3,432	
October 19	John Carroll	Mount Union Stadium; Alliance, OH	W 35–16	8,072	
October 26	at Capital	Columbus, OH	W 38–22	2,945	
November 2	Marietta	Mount Union Stadium; Alliance, OH	W 56–10	3,872	
November 9	at Ohio Northern	Ada, OH	W 34–24	3,189	
November 16	Wilmington (OH)	Mount Union Stadium; Alliance, OH	W 62–0	4,772	
November 30	Wheaton (IL)*	Mount Union Stadium; Alliance, OH (NCAA Division III second round)	W 42–21	3,128	
December 7	Wabash*	Mount Union Stadium; Alliance, OH (NCAA Division III quarterfinal)	W 45–16	4,011	
December 14	John Carroll*	Mount Union Stadium; Alliance, OH (NCAA Division III semifinal)	W 57–19	8,387	
December 21	vs. Trinity (TX)*	Salem Football Stadium; Salem, VA (Stagg Bowl)	W 48–7	4,389	
*Non-conference game
