= Mount Union Purple Raiders football =

Football program representing the University of Mount Union

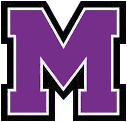
- First season: 1893; 133 years ago
- Athletic director: Mike Parnell
- Head coach: Geoff Dartt; 7th season, 74–8 (.902)
- Location: Alliance, Ohio
- Stadium: Kehres Stadium (capacity: 5,600)
- NCAA division: Division III
- Conference: OAC
- Colors: Purple and white
- All-time record: 880–398–37 (.683)
- Playoff record: 104–18 (.852)

NCAA Division III championships
- 1993, 1996, 1997, 1998, 2000, 2001, 2002, 2005, 2006, 2008, 2012, 2015, 2017

Conference championships
- 36
- Consensus All-Americans: 123
- Rivalries: John Carroll Blue Streaks; Wisconsin–Whitewater Warhawks; North Central Cardinals
- Fight song: On, Mount to victory!
- Mascot: MUcaw
- Marching band: Purple Raider Marching Band
- Website: athletics.mountunion.com

The Mount Union Purple Raiders football program represents the University of Mount Union in college football at the NCAA Division III level as members of the Ohio Athletic Conference (OAC). Mount Union have played their home games at Mount Union Stadium in Alliance, Ohio since 1913, which makes it the oldest college football stadium in Ohio. The Purple Raiders have claimed 13 NCAA Division III Football Championship and 36 OAC titles and have 12 undefeated seasons.

Mount Union's first game was an 18–0 loss at home to Kenyon College, from Gambier, Ohio, on November 7, 1893. The first program victory came 11 days later in a 20–0 win over Salem University in Salem, West Virginia. The team competed as an independent from 1893 until 1913, and joined the OAC in 1914.

The Purple Raiders played in the OAC for 71 years before winning their first conference title, which came in 1985 under coach Ken Wable. Since then, the program has won 30 titles in 35 years, including a 24-year streak from 1992 to 2015. During this run, the Purple Raiders went 214–2 versus OAC opponents. The title-streak spanned two coaches, Larry Kehres and Vince Kehres. John Carroll University ended the streak by winning the OAC title in 2016 where they defeated Mount Union 31–28 on November 12, 2016.

== History ==
=== Beginnings (1893–1913) ===
The first football game played by Mount Union was on the school's baseball field on November 7, 1893 against Kenyon College. In their first year they went 1–2, with their lone win coming against Salem University. The following season, the team had their first coach, Coach Davis, who led them to a 4–5 record. In 1895 and 1898 the team failed to field a team, but was able to have their first winning season, under Coach Battles in 1899, with a 5–1–1 record.

It wasn't until 1903 and 1904 that the program maintained a head coach for two consecutive years, which was Pearl Sommerville, who went 4–11–1 in his two seasons. The program built stability when Robert Dawson took over as coach in 1909 and oversaw the program as it joined the Ohio Athletic Conference (OAC) in 1914.

=== A growing program (1914–1961) ===
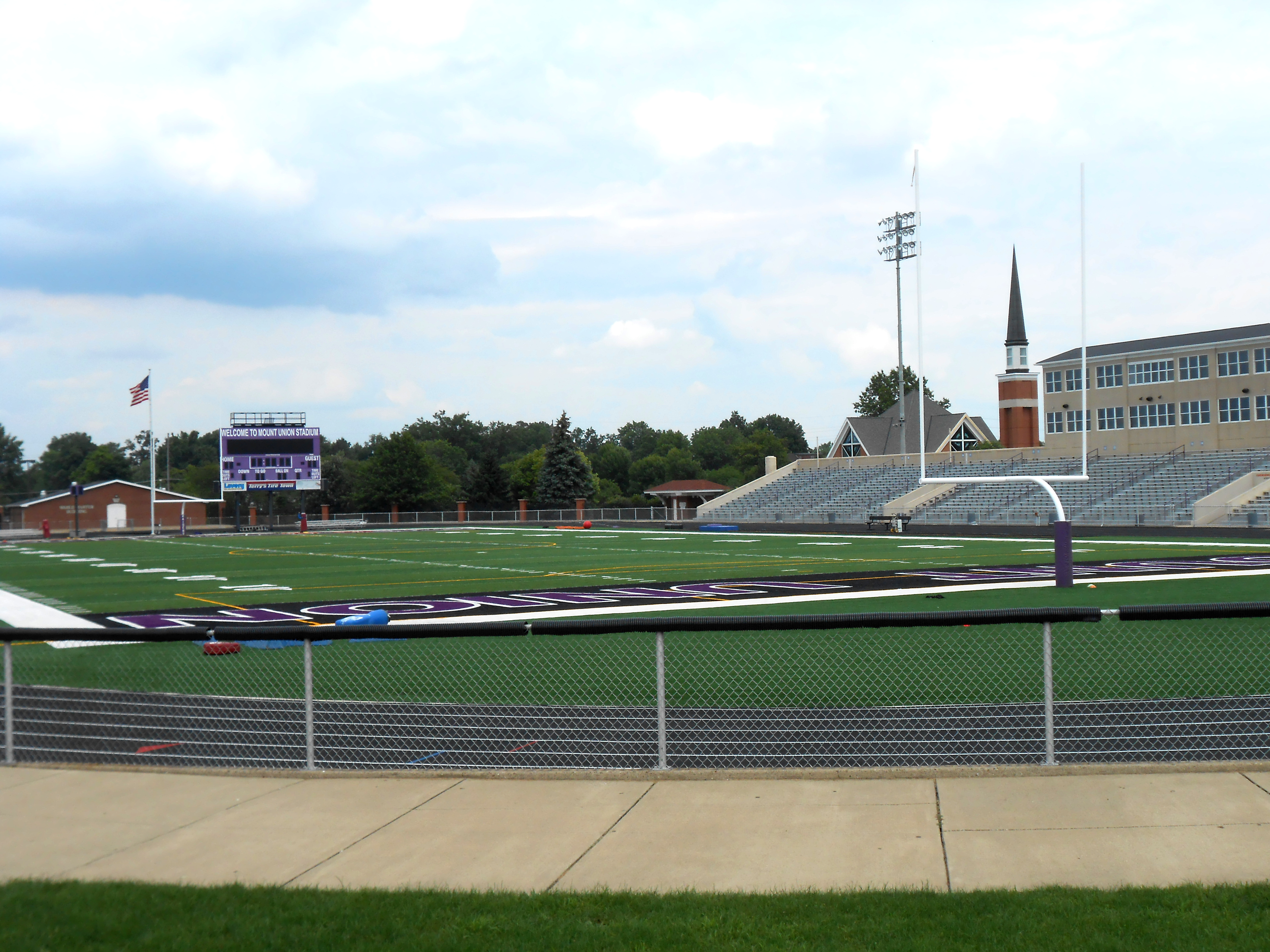
Kehres Stadium, built in 1913, is the Mount Union home venue

In addition to Dawson's eight-year tenure and a transition to the OAC, Mount Union Stadium was built which gave the program a permanent home and even more stability. Over the course of Dawson's career, he went 49–24–4 (10–7, OAC).

From 1920 to 1921, Mount Union was coached by Eddie Casey, who went on to be inducted into the College Football Hall of Fame in 1968. Following his time at Mount Union, he coached Harvard, the National Football League's Washington Redskins, and the American Football League's Boston Bears.

John M. Thorpe coached the Purple Raiders from 1922 to 1931, compiling a 55–32–7 (42–22–4, OAC) record. During his tenure, he served as both head coach and athletic director for the school. He was followed by Harry Geltz (1932–1941), who was unable to match his long-term success and left the program in 1941, when he went 1–15–1 (0–11, OAC) in his final two years.

Pete Pederson was hired in 1942, but after one season the program was suspended due to World War II. The program remained suspended for three seasons and returned under Pederson in 1946. Pederson left after the 1949 season to take over as head coach at Marshall.

=== Ken Wable era (1962–1985) ===
Ken Wable was hired as the head coach for the Purple Raiders in 1962. He had previously served as an assistant coach at Wake Forest, Muskingum, and Cornell. Wable coached at Mount Union for 24 seasons, where he went 123–95–2. Beginning in 1979, Wable coached the team to a winning record of 7–2, and every season since, the program has maintained a winning record. Wable was named OAC Coach of the Year in 1982 and 1985. In 1985, he led the Purple Raiders to their first conference title and first berth in the NCAA Division III Football Playoffs.

=== Larry Kehres era (1986–2012) ===
Larry Kehres became the athletic director at Mount Union. In 1986, he took over as head football coach. His teams have won 11 NCAA Division III Football Championships (1993, 1996–1998, 2000–2002, 2005–2006, 2008, 2012).

Kehres' teams hold several NCAA records. In addition to owning the two longest winning streaks in NCAA history, 54 wins from 1996 to 1999 and 55 wins from 2000 to 2003, the Mount Union Purple Raiders won a conference title in 23 of his 27 seasons; at Kehres' retirement, Mount Union had an ongoing streak of 21 conference titles. During his tenure, Kehres only lost eight games and tied three times in conference play. From 1994 to 2005, his squads won 100 consecutive games against Ohio Athletic Conference opponents. The 1994 season was the last under his tenure in which the Purple Raiders lost more than one game. Finally, his record of 72–3 (.960) in his final five seasons is the best in college football history, surpassing Tom Osborne's 60–3 (.952) in his final five seasons at Nebraska.

Kehres is 3–1 against college football's all-time winningest coach, John Gagliardi, having beaten Gagliardi's St. John's squads twice in playoff match-ups and traded wins in the national title game in 2000 and 2003.

In 2009, Kehres was named first vice president of the American Football Coaches Association (AFCA). He was elected President of the AFCA in January 2010. In 2013, Kehres retired after 27 years as head coach to become the Athletic Director of Mount Union.

=== Vince Kehres era (2013–2019) ===
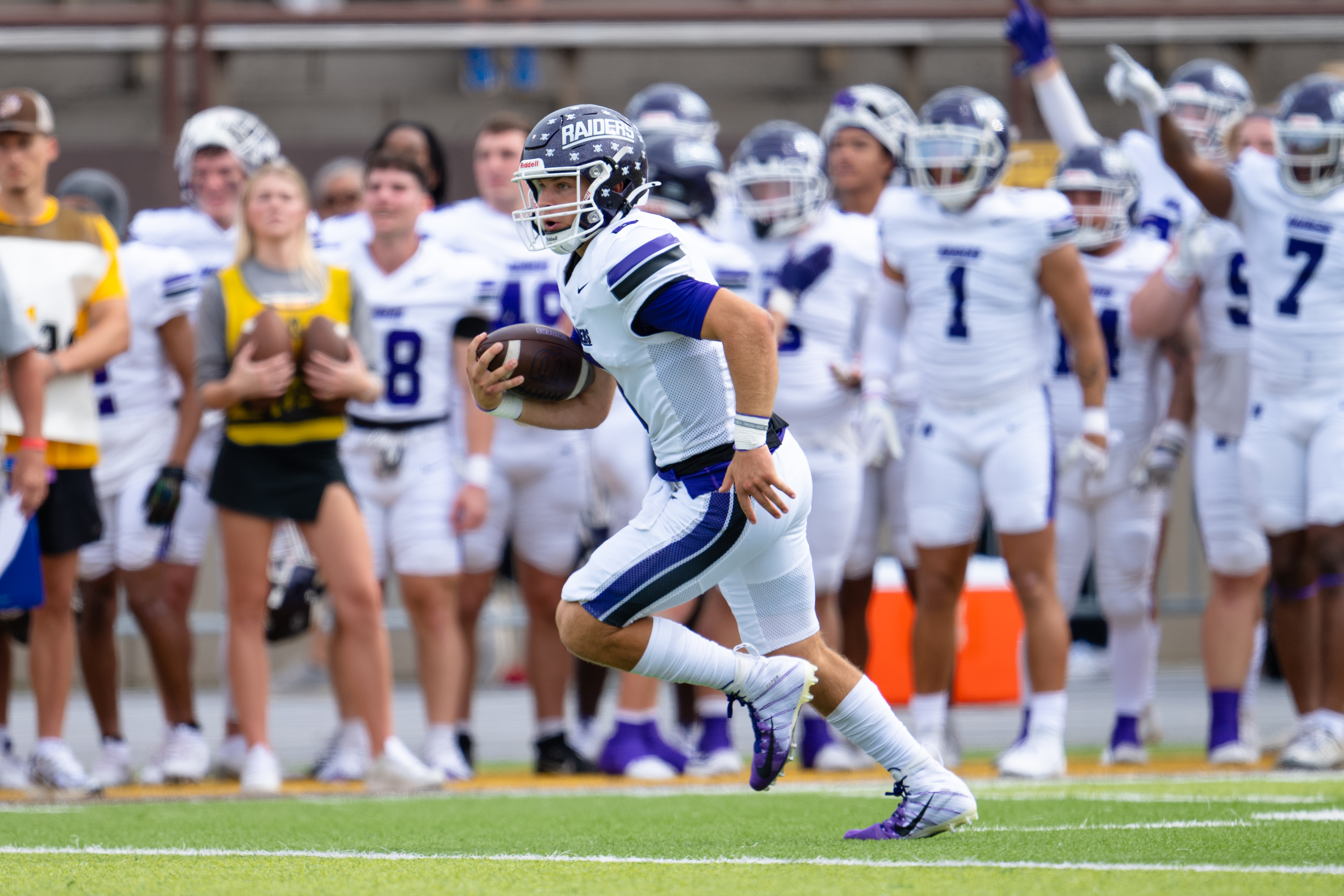
Noah Beaudrie carries the ball for Mount Union during a 2024 victory over Baldwin Wallace

Vince Kehres, who had previously served as defensive coordinator, was hired as the next head coach of Mount Union on May 8, 2013, replacing his father. During his time as coach Vince went 95–6 winning six OAC titles and two national titles in his seven years. He was named OAC Coach of the year three times. On January 13, 2020, it was announced that Vince was leaving the program to take a position with the Toledo Rockets. All together, Vince spent 13 years with Mount Union, eight of which were as defensive coordinator. He would leave the university with the highest winning percentage in program history.

== Head coaching history ==
Name	Seasons	Years	Games	Record	Winning pct	Conf. titles	Nat'l titles
Geoff Dartt	2020–present	7	82	74–8	.902	6	0
Vince Kehres	2013–2019	7	101	95–6	.941	6	2
Larry Kehres	1986–2012	27	359	332–24–3	.929	23	11
Ken Wable	1962–1985	24	220	123–95–2	.564	1	0
Duke Barret	1956–1961	6	52	15–37	.288	0	0
Nelson Jones	1950–1955	6	50	18–29–3	.390	0	0
Pete Pederson	1942, 1946–1949	8	43	22–20–1	.523	0	0
Harry Geltz	1932–1941	10	87	34–45–8	.437	0	0
John M. Thorpe	1922–1931	10	94	55–32–7	.622	0	0
Eddie Casey	1920–1921	2	17	7–9–1	.441	0	0
George O'Brien	1917–1919	3	23	9–14	.391	0	0
Robert Dawson	1909–1916	8	77	49–24–4	.662	0	0
H. B. Emerson	1908	1	10	5–4–1	.550	0	0
E. J. Stewart	1907	1	11	9–2	.818	0	0
Harry Pierce	1906	1	8	2–5–1	.313	0	0
Roy Beechler	1905	1	8	2–6	.250	0	0
Pearl Sommerville	1903–1904	2	16	4–11–1	.281	0	0
Frank Halliday	1902	1	9	6–3	.667	0	0
Campbell	1901	1	11	5–5–1	.500	0	0
Wendell H. Phelps	1900	1	6	1–4–1	.250	0	0
Melvin L. Battles	1899	1	7	5–1–1	.786	0	0
Joe L. Stamp	1897	1	7	2–4–1	.357	0	0
Albert J. Norton	1896	1	8	3–4–1	.438	0	0
Herbert C. Davis	1894	1	9	4–5	.444	0	0
Jerome Dodson	1893	1	3	1–2	.333	0	0
Total	1893–present	129	1281	864–395–37	.681	34	13

== Championships ==
Through the 2025 season, the Purple Raiders have won 36 Ohio Athletic Conference (OAC) titles. They won their first OAC title in 1985 and repeated in 1986, followed by a third title in 1990. Beginning with their 1992 OAC championship, the team won 24 consecutive OAC titles, with their 2015 championship being the final in the streak.

Ohio Athletic Conference championships
Year	Coach	Conf. record
1985	Ken Wable	8–0
1986	Larry Kehres	8–0
1990	Larry Kehres	9–0
1992	Larry Kehres	9–0
1993	Larry Kehres	9–0
1994	Larry Kehres	8–1
1995	Larry Kehres	9–0
1996	Larry Kehres	9–0
1997	Larry Kehres	9–0
1998	Larry Kehres	9–0
1999	Larry Kehres	9–0
2000	Larry Kehres	9–0
2001	Larry Kehres	9–0
2002	Larry Kehres	9–0
2003	Larry Kehres	9–0
2004	Larry Kehres	9–0
2005	Larry Kehres	8–1
2006	Larry Kehres	9–0
2007	Larry Kehres	9–0
2008	Larry Kehres	9–0
2009	Larry Kehres	9–0
2010	Larry Kehres	9–0
2011	Larry Kehres	9–0
2012	Larry Kehres	9–0
2013	Vince Kehres	9–0
2014	Vince Kehres	9–0
2015	Vince Kehres	9–0
2017	Vince Kehres	9–0
2018	Vince Kehres	9–0
2019	Vince Kehres	9–0
2020	Geoff Dartt	4–0
2021	Geoff Dartt	9–0
2022	Geoff Dartt	9–0
2023	Geoff Dartt	9–0
2024	Geoff Dartt	9–0
2025	Geoff Dartt	8–0

Through the 2025 season, Mount Union has won 13 NCAA Division III National Championships and has 23 total appearances in the Stagg Bowl, including 11 consecutive appearances from 2005 to 2015, along with 36 playoff appearances.

Stagg Bowl appearances
Year	Opponent	Outcome
1993	Rowan	W 34–24
1996	Rowan	W 56–24
1997	Lycoming	W 61–12
1998	Rowan	W 44–12
2000	Saint John's (MN)	W 10–7
2001	Bridgewater	W 30–27
2002	Trinity (TX)	W 48–7
2003	Saint John's (MN)	L 6–24
2005	Wisconsin–Whitewater	W 35–28
2006	Wisconsin–Whitewater	W 35–16
2007	Wisconsin–Whitewater	L 21–31
2008	Wisconsin–Whitewater	W 31–26
2009	Wisconsin–Whitewater	L 28–38
2010	Wisconsin–Whitewater	L 21–31
2011	Wisconsin–Whitewater	L 10–13
2012	St. Thomas (MN)	W 28–10
2013	Wisconsin–Whitewater	L 14–52
2014	Wisconsin–Whitewater	L 34–43
2015	St. Thomas (MN)	W 49–35
2017	Mary Hardin–Baylor	W 12–0
2018	Mary Hardin–Baylor	L 16–24
2022	North Central (IL)	L 21–28
2024	North Central (IL)	L 25–41

== Individual awards and achievements ==
=== NCAA Division III Player of the Year ===
- 1993: Jim Ballard
- 1996: Bill Borchert
- 1997: Bill Borchert
- 2001: Chuck Moore
- 2002: Dan Pugh
- 2008: Nate Kmic & Greg Micheli
- 2013: Kevin Burke
- 2014: Kevin Burke

=== Mike Gregory/Bob Packard Award ===
Awarded to the OAC's Most Valuable offensive back and offensive lineman. The award was renamed in 2008.

- 1975: Gary Frost
- 1982: Dave McLaughlin
- 1983: Steve Harter & Tony Colao
- 1985: Scott Woolf
- 1986: Mike Groff & Scott Gindlesberger
- 1987: Russ King
- 1989: Mike Garn
- 1990: Brad Petro & John Bouloubasis
- 1992: Jim Ballard & Mike Elder
- 1993: Jim Ballard
- 1994: Matt Johnson
- 1996: Bill Borchert
- 1997: Bill Borchert
- 1998: J. W. Wearley
- 1999: Tom Bauer
- 2000: Gary Smeck & Jason Gerber
- 2001: Ed Malone & Chuck Moore
- 2002: Dan Pugh
- 2003: Larry Kinnard
- 2004: Zac Bruney
- 2005: Jason Lewis
- 2006: Jason Lewis
- 2007: Greg Micheli
- 2007: Derek Blanchard
- 2008: Nate Kmic
- 2012: Kevin Burke
- 2014: Kevin Burke
- 2017: D'Angelo Fulford
- 2018: D'Angelo Fulford
- 2019: D'Angelo Fulford
- 2021: Braxton Plunk
- 2024: Tyler Echeverry

=== OAC Defensive Player of the Year ===
- 1984: Troy Starr

=== Paul Hoernemann Award ===
Awarded to the OAC's most valuable defensive lineman

- 1985: John Heather
- 1992: Mike Hallett
- 1993: Mike Hallett
- 1997: Jim Eismon
- 1998: Jeremy Yoder
- 2001: Matt Campbell
- 2002: Matt Campbell
- 2007: Pat McCullough
- 2008: James Herbert
- 2011: Charles Dieuseul
- 2012: Matt Fechko
- 2014: Tom Lally
- 2015: Tom Lally

=== Ed Sherman Award ===
Awarded to the OAC's Most Valuable Receiver

- 1988: Ed Hogya
- 1992: Rob Atwood
- 1993: Ed Bubonics
- 1996: Kevin Knestrick
- 1997: Kevin Knestrick
- 1999: Adam Marino
- 2000: Adam Marino
- 2003: Randell Knapp
- 2005: Scott Casto
- 2006: Pierre Garçon
- 2007: Pierre Garcon
- 2008: Cecil Shorts
- 2009: Cecil Shorts
- 2017: Justin Hill
- 2018: Justin Hill
- 2019: Justin Hill
- 2021: Wayne Ruby Jr.

=== Bill Edwards/Gene Slaughter Award ===
Awarded to the OAC's most valuable or top linebacker. The award was renamed.

- 1990: Dave Lasecki
- 1993: Rob Rodgers
- 1994: Rob Rodgers
- 1995: Mike Wenderfer
- 1998: Jason Hall
- 2000: Jesse Pearson
- 2001: Jason Perkins
- 2004: Shaun Spisak
- 2005: Mike Gibbons
- 2009: Sam Kershaw
- 2012: Charles Dieuseul
- 2015: Hank Spencer
- 2018: Danny Robinson
- 2021: Mason McMillen

=== Lee J. Tressel Award ===
Awarded to the OAC's most valuable defensive back.

- 1996: Sean Moore
- 1997: Mark Black
- 1998: Kris Bugara
- 2001: Chris Kern
- 2002: Chris Kern
- 2004: Jesse Clum
- 2008: Daryl Ely
- 2009: Drew McClain
- 2011: Nick Driskill
- 2012: Nick Driskill
- 2014: Alex Kocheff
- 2015: Tre Jones
- 2018: Louis Berry IV
- 2019: Kordell Ford
- 2021: Malik Britt

=== Ken Wable Award ===
Awarded to the OAC's top offensive lineman.

- 2011: Antonio Tate
- 2012: Antonio Tate
- 2016: Brooks Jenkins
- 2017: Cole Parish
- 2019: Sean Sherman
- 2021: John Valentine

=== Clyde A. Lamb Award ===
The Clyde A. Lamb Award is presented annually to the top male and female senior scholar-athlete at each Ohio Athletic Conference institution.

- 1985: Rick Marabito
- 1986: Scott Woolf
- 1987: Scott Gindlesberger
- 1988: Joe Knoll
- 1989: Paul Hrics
- 1992: Jeff Bartolet
- 1993: Eric Mysona
- 1995: Richard Dine
- 1998: Michael Altier
- 1999: Darin Kershner
- 2000: Tom Bauer
- 2001: Matt LaVerde
- 2002: Chuck Moore
- 2003: Josh Liddell
- 2004: Zac Bruney
- 2006: Scott Casto
- 2007: Eric Safran
- 2008: Greg Micheli
- 2009: Judd Lutz
- 2011: Alex Ferrara
- 2012: Nick Driskill
- 2015: Hank Spencer
- 2019: Louis Berry IV

=== First Team All-Americans ===
- 1959: Bill Davis (QB/DB)
- 1979: Paul Gulling (WR), Jeff Teece (DT)
- 1985: Scott Woolf (QB), John Heather (DT)
- 1986: Russ Kring (FB), Scott Gindlesberger (QB)
- 1987: Russ Kring (FB)
- 1990: Dave Lasecki (LB), Ken Edelman (K)
- 1992: Jim Ballard (WB), Mike Elder (OT), Rob Atwood (TE), Chris Dattilio (LB)
- 1993: Ed Bobonics (WR), Mike Hallett (DT), Rob Rodgers (LB),Jim Ballard (QB)
- 1994: Matt Johnson (OT)
- 1995: Matt Liggett (DT), Mike Wenderfer (OG)
- 1996: Bill Borchert (QB), Josh Weber (OT), Brian Wervey (LB), Josh Weimer (OT)
- 1997: Bill Borchert (QB), Josh Weimer (OT), Vic Ricketts (OG)
- 1998: Jason Hall (LB), Kris Bugara (DB), J.W. Wearley (OT)
- 1999: Tom Bauer (C), Jason Gerber (OT), Adam Marino (WR)
- 2000: Jason Gerber (OT), Gary Smeck (QB), Adam Marino (WR), Bill Rychel (OL)
- 2001: Adam Indorf (OL), Todd Braden (DE), Matt Campbell (DE), Chris Kern (CB), Ed Malone (OL)
- 2002: Matt Campbell (DE), Chris Kern (CB), Larry Kinnard (OL), Dan Pugh (RB)
- 2003: Larry Kinnard (OL), Bob Bradley (OL), Shaun Spisak (LB)
- 2004: Shaun Spisak (LB), Johnny Josef (DE)
- 2005: Ross Watson (CB), Mike Gibbons (LB), Jason Lewis (OT)
- 2006: Jason Lewis (OT), Justen Stickley (DE), Pierre Garçon (WR), Derek Blanchard (OL), Nate Kmic (RB)
- 2007: Pierre Garcon (WR), Derek Blanchard (OL), Eric Safran (OL), Matt Kostelnik (DB), Nate Kmic (RB), Greg Micheli (QB), Patt McCullough (DT)
- 2008: Nate Kmic (RB), Greg Micheli (QB), James Herbert (DL), Luke Summers (DL)
- 2009: Cecil Shorts (WR), Sam Kershaw (LB)
- 2010: Cecil Shorts (WR)
- 2011: Brett Ekkens (OL), Charles Dieuseul (DL), Nick Driskill (DB)
- 2012: Nick Driskill (DB), Antonio Tate (OL), Jasper Collins, Chris Denton (RET), Matt Mattox (OL)
- 2013: Kevin Burke (QB), Matt Fechko (DL)
- 2014: Kevin Burke (QB), Alex Kocheff, Tom Lally
- 2015: Alex Kocheff, Tom Lally, Mike Furda
- 2016: Mitch Doraty, Brooks Jenkins, BJ Mitchell, Mike Vidal
- 2017: Mike Vidal, Elijah Berry, Cole Parrish, Gabe Brown, Alex Louthan
- 2018: Louis Berry IV, Danny Robinson, Andrew Roesch, D'Angelo Fulford

== Notable alumni ==
- Kevin Burke, Austrian Football League and Nationalliga A (American football) player. Two-time Gagliardi Trophy winner. College football coach
- Jim Ballard, NFL Europe, XFL and CFL player. Inducted into the College Football Hall of Fame
- Matt Campbell, college football head coach
- Jason Candle, college football head coach
- Dom Capers, NFL head coach of the Carolina Panthers (1995–1998) and Houston Texans (2002–2005)
- Jasper Collins, CFL player, NFL coach
- Wilmer Fleming, NFL player
- Pierre Garçon, NFL player, 2013 NFL receptions leader
- Alex Grinch, college football coach
- Larry Kehres, college football coach
- Nate Kmic, IFAF World Champion, IFAF World Championship MVP, Vaahteraliiga player. All time leading rusher in college football history.
- Harry March, co-founder of the New York Giants and president of the American Football League (1936)
- Kyle Miller, NFL player
- Kurt Rocco, Arena Football League player
- Cecil Shorts, NFL player
- Jeff Shreve, public address announcer for the Cleveland Browns, Akron Zips (football / men's basketball) and Mid-American Conference
- Scott Woolf, NFL player
- Nick Sirianni, Super Bowl Winning NFL head coach for the Philadelphia Eagles
