= Vince Kehres =

American football player and coach (born 1976)

Current position
- Title: Defensive coordinator
- Team: Syracuse
- Conference: ACC

Biographical details
- Born: February 26, 1976 (age 50)

Playing career
- 1994–1997: Mount Union
- Position: Defensive end

Coaching career (HC unless noted)
- 1999: Austintown Fitch HS (OH) (WR)
- 2000–2003: Mount Union (DL)
- 2004: Mount Union (OL)
- 2005–2012: Mount Union (DC)
- 2013–2019: Mount Union
- 2020–2025: Toledo (DC/LB)
- 2026–present: Syracuse (DC)

Head coaching record
- Overall: 95–6
- Tournaments: 26–5 (NCAA D-III playoffs)

Accomplishments and honors

Championships
- 2 NCAA Division III (2015, 2017); 6 OAC (2013–2015, 2017–2019)

Awards
- 3× OAC Coach of the Year; 2× D3football.com National Coach of the Year (2015, 2017)

Vincent G. Kehres (born February 26, 1976) is an American football coach and former player. He currently serves as the defensive coordinator for the Syracuse Orange.

Kehres served as the head football coach at the University of Mount Union in Alliance, Ohio from 2013 to 2019. In seven seasons at the helm of the Mount Union Purple Raiders football program, he compiled a record of 95–6 and led Mount Union to two NCAA Division III Football Championship titles, in 2015 and 2017. Prior to joining Syracuse, Kehres was the defensive coordinator and linebackers coach at Toledo from 2020 to 2025. Kehres is the son of College Football Hall of Fame inductee Larry Kehres, who preceded him as head football coach at Mount Union.

== Coaching career ==
Kehres both played as a player and served as an assistant coach and defensive coordinator under his father. Prior to his return to Mount Union to coach in 2000, he briefly coached as an assistant for a single year at Austintown Fitch High School.

Kehres was named the head football coach at Mount Union on May 8, 2013.

On January 13, 2020, The Blade reported that Kehres was leaving Mount Union to take a position with the Toledo Rockets as a defensive coach.

In December 2025, Kehres was hired as the defensive coordinator for the Syracuse Orange.

== Family ==
Kehres is the son of Larry Kehres, who preceded him as head football coach at Mount Union. The younger Kehres and his wife, Lindsay, have three sons, Evan, Bo, and Jackson.

== Head coaching record ==
Year	Team	Overall	Conference	Standing	Bowl/playoffs	D3^{#}
Mount Union Purple Raiders (Ohio Athletic Conference) (2013–2019)
2013	Mount Union	14–1	9–0	1st	L NCAA Division III Championship	3
2014	Mount Union	14–1	9–0	1st	L NCAA Division III Championship	2
2015	Mount Union	15–0	9–0	1st	W NCAA Division III Championship	1
2016	Mount Union	12–2	8–1	2nd	L NCAA Division III Semifinal	4
2017	Mount Union	15–0	9–0	1st	W NCAA Division III Championship	1
2018	Mount Union	14–1	9–0	1st	L NCAA Division III Championship	2
2019	Mount Union	11–1	9–0	1st	L NCAA Division III Second Round	3
Mount Union:		95–6	62–1			
Total:		95–6				
National championship Conference title Conference division title or championship game berth
^{#}Rankings from D3football.com.
