= Shannon Griffith =

American football player and coach (born 1967)

Shannon Griffith aka Coach Griff
Current position
- Title: Creator and Host of Hoosier Football Tailgate for TheHoosier.com, and Upon Further Review covering HS Football in North East Indiana with an emphasis on the SAC in Fort Wayne.
- Team: TheHoosier.com
- Conference: HCAC

Biographical details
- Born: July 16, 1967 (age 59); Fort Wayne, Indiana
- Education: Ball State

Playing career
- 1987–1990: Ball State
- Position: QB

Coaching career (HC unless noted)
- 1991: Ball State (GA)
- 1992–1993: Northwood (co–OC/OL)
- 1994–2003: Ball State (QB/WR)
- 2004–2015: Manchester

Head coaching record
- Overall: 40–79

Accomplishments and honors

Championships
- 1989 Mid-American Conference as a Player 1996 Mid-American Conference as a QB Coach

Awards
- HCAC Coach of the Year (2012)

Shannon Griffith is an American former football coach. He served as the head coach at Manchester University in North Manchester, Indiana, from 2004 to 2015. Color Commentary for 1380 The Fan High School Football Broadcast, creator and host of The Hoosier Football Tailgate on Youtube, Lead Football Analyst on TheHoosier.com, and Upon Further Review covering HS Football in North East Indiana. Affectionately known as Coach Griff, Griff played football for the Ball State Cardinals from 1986-1991 as a quarterback. During his playing days, the Cardinals captured the 1 989 MAC Championship and played in the California Raisin Bowl against Fresno State Bulldogs.

== Shannon Griffith Early Years in Coaching ==
Shannon Griffith, widely known as “Coach Griff,” has had a notable career in college football, characterized by his leadership and dedication to the sport. Griffith began his coaching career as a graduate assistant at Ball State University in 1990. He coached the TEs during his GA days and helped implement the new video editing system. Coach Griff's first full-time job in College Football was at Northwood University in Midland, MI. Coach Griff coached under the leadership of Pat Riepma, who was hired in 1992 from Hillsdale College to lead Northwood. Shannon was a part of Coach Riepma first staff at the Wood. In 1994, Paul Schudle left Ball State to become the Offensive Coordinator at Illinois under Lou Tepper. Schudle's departure opened the Head Football Coach position at Ball State, paving the way for former Ball State Offensive Coordinator Bill Lynch to take over for Coach Schudle. Lynch came back to Ball State after serving as the OC at Indiana University under Bill Mallory. Coach Griff returned to Ball State as the Quarterback coach after previously serving as an Offensive GA from 1990-1992 under Bill Lynch.

in 2002 a change at Ball State was made by Athletic Director Bubba Cunnigham after the Cardinals finished that year at 6-6 thus leaving the entire staff looking for job. After a brief stint in Florida as the Offensive Coordinator at Bishop Kenny HS, Coach Griff was named Head Football Coach at Manchester University in North Manchester, Indiana, leading the Spartans for the next 13 years before transitioning to Director of Development for the next 5 years.

== Head coaching record ==
Year	Team	Overall	Conference	Standing	Bowl/playoffs
Manchester Spartans (Heartland Collegiate Athletic Conference) (2004–2015)
2004	Manchester	0–10	0–6	7th	
2005	Manchester	2–8	1–5	7th	
2006	Manchester	1–9	0–7	8th	
2007	Manchester	3–7	1–6	T–7th	
2008	Manchester	5–5	3–4	T–5th	
2009	Manchester	5–5	5–2	T–2nd	
2010	Manchester	2–8	1–7	8th	
2011	Manchester	4–6	3–5	7th	
2012	Manchester	6-4	6–2 HCAC Coach of the Year	T–2nd	
2013	Manchester	3–7	3–5	T–6th	
2014	Manchester	4–6	3–5	T–5th	
2015	Manchester	5–4	5–3	T–4th	
Manchester:		40–79	31–57		
Total:		40–79			
