= Steve Briggs (American football) =

American football coach (born 1960 or 1961)

Biographical details
- Born: c. 1960 or 1961 (age 64–65); Lee, Massachusetts, U.S.

Coaching career (HC unless noted)
- 1983: Springfield (freshman DB)
- 1984: Bowdoin (WR)
- 1985–1986: Richmond (GA)
- 1987: Lehigh (OLB/SS)
- 1988–1989: Susquehanna (DB)
- 1990–2014: Susquehanna

Head coaching record
- Overall: 127–125
- Tournaments: 3–2 (NCAA D-III playoffs)

Accomplishments and honors

Championships
- 2 MAC Commonwealth Division (1998–1999); 1 Liberty League (2009)

Steve Briggs (born c. 1960 or 1961) is an American former college football coach. He was the head football coach for Susquehanna University from 1990 to 2014. He also coached for Springfield, Bowdoin, Richmond, and Lehigh.

== Head coaching record ==
Year	Team	Overall	Conference	Standing	Bowl/playoffs
Susquehanna Crusaders (Middle Atlantic Conference) (1990–2006)
1990	Susquehanna	7–3	6–2	T–2nd	
1991	Susquehanna	11–2	7–1	2nd	L NCAA Division III Seminfinal
1992	Susquehanna	9–1	7–1	2nd	
1993	Susquehanna	6–4	3–2	T–2nd (Commonwealth)	
1994	Susquehanna	6–4	3–2	T–2nd (Commonwealth)	
1995	Susquehanna	5–5	1–4	T–5th (Commonwealth)	
1996	Susquehanna	5–5	3–2	3rd (Commonwealth)	
1997	Susquehanna	6–4	2–3	4th (Commonwealth)	
1998	Susquehanna	6–3	4–1	T–1st (Commonwealth)	
1999	Susquehanna	7–3	4–1	1st (Commonwealth)	
2000	Susquehanna	7–3	2–3	T–3rd (Commonwealth)	
2001	Susquehanna	4–6	4–5	T–5th	
2002	Susquehanna	5–5	5–4	T–5th	
2003	Susquehanna	4–6	4–5	T–6th	
2004	Susquehanna	4–6	3–6	T–7th	
2005	Susquehanna	2–8	1–8	10th	
2006	Susquehanna	2–8	2–7	T–8th	
Susquehanna Crusaders (Liberty League) (2007–2009)
2007	Susquehanna	2–8	1–6	T–6th	
2008	Susquehanna	4–6	3–4	T–5th	
2009	Susquehanna	8–3	6–1	T–1st	L NCAA Division III First Round
Susquehanna Crusaders (Centennial Conference) (2010–2014)
2010	Susquehanna	2–8	1–8	9th	
2011	Susquehanna	6–4	5–4	5th	
2012	Susquehanna	6–4	5–4	T–5th	
2013	Susquehanna	1–9	1–8	10th	
2014	Susquehanna	2–8	2–7	9th	
Susquehanna:		127–125	85–99		
Total:		127–125			
National championship Conference title Conference division title or championship game berth
