= Douglas Lange =

American football and track and field coach

Current position
- Title: Head coach (track)
- Team: Martin Luther
- Conference: UMAC

Coaching career (HC unless noted)

Football
- 2005–2014: Martin Luther

Track and field
- 2005–present: Martin Luther

Head coaching record
- Overall: 45–52

Accomplishments and honors

Championships
- UMAC (2009)

Awards
- UMAC Coach of the Year (2009)

Douglas Lange is an American football and track and field coach. He is currently the head track and field coach at Martin Luther College in New Ulm, Minnesota, a position he has held since 2005. He was the head football coach at the Martin Luther from 2004 to 2015, highlighted by a 2009 conference championship and being named the Upper Midwest Athletic Conference Coach of the Year.

== Head coaching record ==
=== Football ===
Year	Team	Overall	Conference	Standing	Rank^{#}
Martin Luther Knights (Upper Midwest Athletic Conference) (2005–2014)
2005	Martin Luther	6–3	6–1		
2006	Martin Luther	2–8	2–6		
2007	Martin Luther	6–3	6–2		
2008	Martin Luther	7–3	2–2		
2009	Martin Luther	7–3	4–0		
2010	Martin Luther	5–4	4–2		
2011	Martin Luther	2–8	2–7		
2012	Martin Luther	4–6	2–6		
2013	Martin Luther	4–6	4–5		
2014	Martin Luther	2–8	1–8		
Martin Luther:		45–52	33–39		
Total:		45–52			
National championship Conference title Conference division title or championship game berth
