= Rick Willis =

American athletics coach (born 1966)

Current position
- Title: Vice president for student recruitment
- Team: Wartburg
- Conference: ARC

Biographical details
- Born: February 4, 1966 (age 60); Camanche, Iowa, U.S.

Playing career

Football
- 1984–1987: Cornell (IA)

Baseball
- 1985–1988: Cornell (IA)
- Positions: Defensive back (football); Second baseman (baseball)

Coaching career (HC unless noted)

Football
- 1988–1989: Illinois (GA)
- 1990–1996: Wittenberg (DC)
- 1997–2005: Wartburg
- 2008–2020: Wartburg

Baseball
- 1991–1996: Wittenberg

Softball
- 2003: Wartburg

Administrative career (AD unless noted)
- 2005–2021: Wartburg
- 2021–present: Wartburg (VP)

Head coaching record
- Overall: 185–46 (football); 150–85 (baseball); 38–10 (softball)
- Tournaments: Football; 10–11 (NCAA D-III playoffs); Softball; 6–3 (NCAA D-III tournament); Baseball; 2–2 (NCAA D-III tournament)

Accomplishments and honors

Championships
- Football; 11 IIAC/ARC (1999, 2002–2004, 2008, 2010, 2013–2014, 2017–2019); Softball; NCAA Regional Champion (2003)

Awards
- Football; 5× IIAC Coach of the Year (1999, 2010, 2013–2014, 2017) Baseball; NCAC Coach of the Year (1996)

Rick Willis (born February 4, 1966) is an American college administrator and former football, baseball, and softball coach. He was the athletic director at Wartburg College in Waverly, Iowa, from 2005 to 2021, before transitioning to vice president for student recruitment. Willis served two stints as the head football coach at Wartburg, from 1997 to 2005 and again from 2008 to 2021, compiled a record of 185–46. He was succeeded in 2021 by his former player and defensive coordinator Chris Winter. He was the head baseball coach at Wittenberg University in Springfield, Ohio from 1991 to 1996, amassing a record of 150–85. Willis also coached the softball team at Wartburg for one season, in 2003, tallying a mark of 38–10 and reaching the Division III Women's College World Series. Willis moved on from being head coach prior to the 2021 season. He was named Wartburg's vice-president for student recruitment.

Willis was born in Camanche, Iowa. He attended Cornell College in Mount Vernon, Iowa, where he played football and baseball, earning all-conference honors in both sports.

== Head coaching record ==
=== Football ===
Year	Team	Overall	Conference	Standing	Bowl/playoffs	D3^{#}
Wartburg Knights (Iowa Conference) (1997–2005)
1997	Wartburg	7–3	5–3	T–3rd		
1998	Wartburg	9–1	9–1	2nd		
1999	Wartburg	10–1	10–0	1st	L NCAA Division III Second Round	
2000	Wartburg	9–1	9–1	2nd		
2001	Wartburg	8–2	7–2	2nd		
2002	Wartburg	10–2	8–1	T–1st	L NCAA Division III Second Round	
2003	Wartburg	11–1	8–0	1st	L NCAA Division III Second Round	4
2004	Wartburg	8–3	6–2	T–1st	L NCAA Division III First Round	
2005	Wartburg	7–3	6–2	3rd		
Wartburg Knights (Iowa Intercollegiate Athletic Conference / American Rivers Conference) (2008–2020)
2008	Wartburg	10–3	7–1	1st	L NCAA Division III Quarterfinal	10
2009	Wartburg	6–4	5–3	3rd		
2010	Wartburg	10–1	8–0	1st	L NCAA Division III First Round	12
2011	Wartburg	8–2	6–2	T–2nd		
2012	Wartburg	6–4	4–3	T–2nd		
2013	Wartburg	9–3	6–1	1st	L NCAA Division III Second Round	15
2014	Wartburg	12–1	7–0	1st	L NCAA Division III Quarterfinal	4
2015	Wartburg	9–1	6–1	2nd		24
2016	Wartburg	6–4	5–3	4th		
2017	Wartburg	12–1	8–0	1st	L NCAA Division III Quarterfinal	10
2018	Wartburg	8–3	7–1	1st	L NCAA Division III First Round	
2019	Wartburg	10–2	7–1	T–1st	L NCAA Division III Second Round	14
2020–21	No team—COVID-19					
Wartburg:		185–46	144–28			
Total:		185–46				
National championship Conference title Conference division title or championship game berth

=== Baseball ===
Record table
Season	Team	Overall	Conference	Standing	Postseason
Wittenberg Tigers (North Coast Athletic Conference) (1991–1996)
1991	Wittenberg	25–16	16–7	4th	
1992	Wittenberg	25–16	14–6	2nd	
1993	Wittenberg	16–18	7–9	T–5th	
1994	Wittenberg	29–12	11–5	4th	NCAA Regional
1995	Wittenberg	27–13	14–9	4th	
1996	Wittenberg	26–10	16–3	2nd	
Wittenberg:		150–85	78–39		
Total:		150–85			

=== Softball ===
Record table
Season	Team	Overall	Conference	Standing	Postseason
Wartburg Knights (Iowa Conference) (2003)
2003	Wartburg	38–10	14–3	2nd	NCAA Division III College World Series
Wartburg:		38–10	14–3		
Total:		38–10			
