= Dale Widolff =

American football coach

Playing career
- 1974: Indianapolis
- Position: Linebacker

Coaching career (HC unless noted)
- 1980–1981: Occidental (DC)
- 1982–2011: Occidental
- 2012: Cal Lutheran (def. assistant)
- 2013: Lewis & Clark (def. assistant)
- 2014: St. Scholastica (DB/ST)
- 2015: Chapman (LB/ST)

Head coaching record
- Overall: 178–101–2
- Tournaments: 3–7 (NCAA D-III playoffs)

Accomplishments and honors

Championships
- 11 SCIAC (1983–1985, 1987–1989, 2001, 2004–2006, 2008)

Dale Widolff is an American former college football coach. He served as the head football coach at Occidental College in Los Angeles from 1982 to 2011, compiling a record of 178–101–2 and leading the Occidental Tigers to 11 Southern California Intercollegiate Athletic Conference (SCIAC) championships. Widolff was fired after 30 years as head coach following an investigation by the National Collegiate Athletic Association (NCAA) into recruiting at Occidental.

== Head coaching record ==
Year	Team	Overall	Conference	Standing	Bowl/playoffs
Occidental Tigers (Southern California Intercollegiate Athletic Conference) (1982–2011)
1982	Occidental	4–5	3–2	T–3rd	
1983	Occidental	8–2	5–0	1st	L NCAA Division III Quarterfinal
1984	Occidental	10–1	5–0 (Note: From 1984 to 1990, the Southern California Intercollegiate Athletic Conference (SCIAC) football schedule included multiple head-to-head meetings each season. In 1984 and 1985, each conference member played two other conference members twice. From 1986 to 1990, each conference member played one other conference member twice. A head-to-head sweep of the two games in one season counted as one win for the winner and one loss for the loser in the conference standings. A split of the two games counted as a tie for each team.)	1st	L NCAA Division III Quarterfinal
1985	Occidental	9–2	5–0	1st	L NCAA Division III Quarterfinal
1986	Occidental	5–3–1	3–1–1	T–2nd	
1987	Occidental	6–2–1	4–0–1	T–1st	
1988	Occidental	7–2	5–0	1st	
1989	Occidental	6–3	4–0–1	T–1st	
1990	Occidental	6–3	4–1	2nd	
1991	Occidental	5–4	3–2	3rd	
1992	Occidental	5–4	3–3	T–3rd	
1993	Occidental	8–1	5–1	2nd	
1994	Occidental	6–3	4–2	3rd	
1995	Occidental	3–6	2–4	T–5th	
1996	Occidental	1–8	1–4	T–5th	
1997	Occidental	1–8	1–4	5th	
1998	Occidental	1–8	1–4	T–5th	
1999	Occidental	2–7	1–5	5th	
2000	Occidental	5–4	2–3	T–3rd	
2001	Occidental	8–1	5–0	1st	
2002	Occidental	5–4	1–4	T–4th	
2003	Occidental	7–2	4–2	T–2nd	
2004	Occidental	10–2	6–0	1st	L NCAA Division III Quarterfinal
2005	Occidental	9–1	6–0	1st	L NCAA Division III First Round
2006	Occidental	9–1	6–0	1st	L NCAA Division III First Round
2007	Occidental	7–2	4–2	3rd	
2008	Occidental	9–1	6–0	1st	L NCAA Division III First Round
2009	Occidental	7–2	5–1	2nd	
2010	Occidental	4–5	3–3	4th	
2011	Occidental	5–4	3–3	T–3rd	
Occidental:		178–101–2	110–51–3		
Total:		178–101–2			
National championship Conference title Conference division title or championship game berth
