= Mike Landers (American football) =

American football coach

Playing career
- 1994–1995: Georgia Tech
- Position: Defensive back

Coaching career (HC unless noted)
- 1998: Wesleyan (assistant)
- 1999–2003: Stonehill (WR)
- 2004–2007: Nichols (DC/LB)
- 2008–2017: Mount Ida
- 2018–2019: Framingham State (DC/ST)
- 2020–2021: Dedham HS (MA) (assistant)
- 2022: Brockton HS (MA) (assistant)
- 2023–2024: Bentley (ST/DL)

Head coaching record
- Overall: 51–63
- Tournaments: 0–1 (NCAA D-III playoffs)

Accomplishments and honors

Championships
- 1 ECFC (2012)

Awards
- ECFC Coach of the Year (2012)

Michael Landers is an American college football coach. He served as the head football coach at Mount Ida College from 2008 to 2017. He played as a walk-on athlete at Georgia Tech. He also coached for Wesleyan, Stonehill, Nichols, Framingham State, Dedham High School, Brockton High School, and Bentley.

The college closed after spring commencement in 2018; the University of Massachusetts Amherst acquired the campus and renamed it the Mount Ida Campus of UMass Amherst.

== Head coaching record ==
Year	Team	Overall	Conference	Standing	Bowl/playoffs
Mount Ida Mustangs (NCAA Division III independent) (2008)
2008	Mount Ida	3–7			
Mount Ida Mustangs (Eastern Collegiate Football Conference) (2009–2017)
2009	Mount Ida	4–7	4–2	T–2nd	
2010	Mount Ida	6–5	5–2	T–2nd	
2011	Mount Ida	6–5	5–2	3rd	
2012	Mount Ida	8–3	6–1	T–1st	L NCAA Division III First Round
2013	Mount Ida	5–5	4–3	T–4th	
2014	Mount Ida	5–5	5–2	T–2nd	
2015	Mount Ida	2–8	2–5	6th	
2016	Mount Ida	4–6	4–3	3rd	
2017	Mount Ida	4–6	3–4	4th	
Mount Ida:		51–63	38–24		
Total:		51–63			
National championship Conference title Conference division title or championship game berth
