= College Football America Yearbook =

The College Football America Yearbook was founded as a digital only publication in 2011 by sportswriter and publisher Kendall Webb, a member of the Football Writers Association of America (FWAA) and the Biletnikoff Award National Selection Committee. At the time of its initial release, it was hailed as being one of the first online preview magazines of its kind. The yearbook was first issued as a print edition in 2012, and has been published in the summer each year since then. In 2013 and 2014, the yearbook was issued as the College Football America Yearbook Encyclopedia, but returned to its original name for the 2015 edition.

The yearbook continued its annual publication with the 2016 edition, featuring the Tennessee Volunteers on the cover; 2017, featuring Louisville quarterback Lamar Jackson on the cover; 2018, featuring Alabama head coach Nick Saban on the cover; 2019, featuring Clemson quarterback Trevor Lawrence on the cover; and 2020, featuring North Dakota State quarterback Trey Lance on the cover.

The 2021 edition of the Yearbook was available to the public on July 24, 2021, with Iowa State quarterback Brock Purdy on the cover. As of 2021 the three members of the staff had traveled more than 300,000 miles for the Yearbook and their travels were profiled in a Dallas Morning News story in 2017.

The College Football America Yearbook was created with the purpose of covering the entire scope of North American college football from Canada to the United States and Mexico. The yearbook starts with the major college programs of the National Collegiate Athletic Association (NCAA) Division I Football Bowl Subdivision and the Division I Football Championship Subdivision. NCAA Division II and III schools are profiled in each edition along with the schools of the National Association of Intercollegiate Athletics (NAIA), National Junior College Athletic Association, California Community College Athletic Association (CCCAA) and Canadian Interuniversity Sport (CIS). Updates on Mexico's Comisión Nacional Deportiva Estudiantil de Instituciones Privadas (CONADEIP) and ONEFA (ONEFA) are included along with American club football organizations such as the National Club Football Association (NCFA) and the Intercollegiate Club Football Federation (ICFF).

In 2014, the yearbook issued its first iBooks edition, and as of 2015, the publication is aligned with CFBMatrix.com for digital distribution. CFBMatrix.com is also the digital home for the annual preseason magazine Phil Steele's College Football Preview. Matthew Postins, a former sportswriter who covered the Tampa Bay Buccaneers and the Dallas Cowboys, and also served as the Publications Director for the Texas Rangers, serves as College Football America's editor-in-chief. Chuck Cox, a long-time, Texas sportswriter who previously wrote for the National Football Foundation's Football Matters, is the publication's director of editorial content. Cox self-published a book, A Matter of Life and Death in Texas, in 2017.
