= Mike Landers =

Mike Landers may refer to:

- Mike Landers (politician)
- Mike Landers (American football)
- Mike Landers (pole vaulter) (born 1983), American pole vaulter, 2007 NCAA runner-up for the UCLA Bruins track and field team
