= Ed Sweeney (American football) =

American football player and coach (1949–2017)

Biographical details
- Born: April 27, 1949
- Died: January 28, 2017 (aged 67); Lewes, Delaware, U.S.

Playing career
- 1968–1970: C. W. Post

Coaching career (HC unless noted)
- 1972: Vermont (GA)
- 1973–1974: Comsewogue HS (NY) (assistant)
- 1975–1977: Saint Sebastian's (MA)
- 1978–1984: Boston University (AHC/DC)
- 1985–1992: Dickinson
- 1993–1995: Colgate
- 1996–1999: Frostburg State
- 2000–2007: Mount Ida
- 2011–2013: Stevenson (assoc. HC/DC)

Head coaching record
- Overall: 114–110–4 (college); 15–5–1 (high school)
- Bowls: 2–2
- Tournaments: 0–2 (NCAA D-III playoffs)

Accomplishments and honors

Championships
- 5 Centennial (1988–1992); 1 ACFC (1999)

Awards
- ACFC Coach of the Year (1999); Kodak Division II Coach of the Year (1989)

Edward F. Sweeney (April 26, 1949 – January 28, 2017) was an American football coach. He served as the head football coach at Dickinson College from 1985 to 1992, Colgate University from 1993 to 1995, Frostburg State University from 1996 to 1999, and Mount Ida College from 2000 to 2007, compiling a career college football coaching record of 114–110–4.

== Coaching career ==
=== Dickinson ===
Sweeney was the head football coach at Dickinson College in Carlisle, Pennsylvania for eight seasons, from 1985 until 1992. His record at Dickinson was 56–23–3. While at Dickinson in 1989, Sweeney was named the Kodak Division II Coach of the Year.

=== Colgate ===
Sweeney coached for three seasons at Colgate University from 1993 through the 1995 season, ending with an overall record of 6–26–1. In his last season at Colgate, his team suffered a winless season with a record of 0–11.

=== Frostburg State ===
After coaching at Colgate for three seasons, Sweeney was named the tenth head coach at Frostburg State University in Frostburg, Maryland. He held this position from 1996 to 1999 and led his teams to accomplishing an overall record of 30–11 (.732). The 1996 team was the ECAC South Bowl Champion, while his 1999 squad won the Atlantic Central Football Conference Championship and also participated in the ECAC South Bowl. For his efforts, Sweeney was the Atlantic Central Football Coach of the Year in 1999.

=== Mount Ida ===
Sweeney took over in 2000 as head football coach at Mount Ida College, an NCAA Division III school in Newton, Massachusetts. He was the second head football coach at Mount Ida, as the program began in 1999 under head coach John Papas. Sweeney recorded his 100th win with a 25–23 triumph at Maine Maritime on September 11, 2004. He resigned in January 2008. Sweeney's record at Mount Ida was 22–51.

=== Stevenson ===
On May 21, 2010, Sweeney was named defensive coordinator at Stevenson University in Stevenson, Maryland. The Stevenson Mustangs began play in 2011.

== Death ==
Sweeney died on January 28, 2017, at a hospital in Lewes, Delaware. He is survived by his daughters Kaitlin and Callie and his son Sean who were the loves of his life. He had been suffering from multiple myeloma.

== Head coaching record ==
=== College ===
Year	Team	Overall	Conference	Standing	Bowl/playoffs
Dickinson Red Devils (Centennial Conference) (1985–1992)
1985	Dickinson	1–8	1–6	7th	
1986	Dickinson	4–6	2–5	7th	
1987	Dickinson	7–3	5–2	T–2nd	
1988	Dickinson	10–1	6–1	T–1st	W ECAC Southern Championship
1989	Dickinson	9–1–1	7–0	1st	L NCAA Division III First Round
1990	Dickinson	8–1–1	5–1–1	1st	
1991	Dickinson	9–1	7–0	1st	L NCAA Division III First Round
1992	Dickinson	8–1–1	5–1–1	1st	L ECAC Southwest Championship
Dickinson:		56–23–3	38–16–2		
Colgate Red Raiders (Patriot League) (1993–1995)
1993	Colgate	3–7–1	1–3–1	5th	
1994	Colgate	3–8	2–3	T–4th	
1995	Colgate	0–11	0–5	6th	
Colgate:		6–26–1	3–11–1		
Frostburg State Bobcats (NCAA Division III independent) (1996–1997)
1996	Frostburg State	9–2			W ECAC Southeast Bowl
1997	Frostburg State	7–3			
Frostburg State Bobcats (Atlantic Central Football Conference) (1998–1999)
1998	Frostburg State	6–3	2–2	3rd	
1999	Frostburg State	8–3	5–1	1st	L ECAC South Bowl
Frostburg State:		30–11	7–3		
Mount Ida Mustangs (NCAA Division III independent) (2000–2007)
2000	Mount Ida	0–8			
2001	Mount Ida	1–8			
2002	Mount Ida	2–7			
2003	Mount Ida	4–6			
2004	Mount Ida	6–2			
2005	Mount Ida	1–9			
2006	Mount Ida	5–4			
2007	Mount Ida	3–7			
Mount Ida:		22–51			
Total:		114–110–4			
National championship Conference title Conference division title or championship game berth
