= John Papas =

American football coach

Playing career
- 1974–1977: Springfield
- Position: Tight end

Coaching career (HC unless noted)
- 1982: Brookline HS (MA) (assistant)
- 1983-1985: Watertown HS (MA) (assistant)
- 1986–1991: Belmont HS (MA)
- 1992–1995: Bentley (assistant)
- 1996: Bentley (associate HC)
- 1997: Harvard (WR)
- 1998: Tufts (assistant)
- 1999: Mount Ida
- 2000-2002: Tufts (special teams)
- 2003–2013: Buckingham Browne & Nichols (MA)

Head coaching record
- Overall: 100–26–2 (high school); 3–4 (college)
- Bowls: 3–1 (high school)

Accomplishments and honors

Championships
- 3 New England Prep, 3 Independent School League (ISL) Titles

Awards
- Massachusetts High School Football Coaches Hall of Fame, New England Prep School Coaches Hall of Fame

Records
- All Time Winningest Coach at Buckingham Browne & Nichols School

John Papas is an American former football coach. He was the head football coach at Buckingham Browne & Nichols School, a private school in Cambridge, Massachusetts, from 2003 to 2013. He also was an assistant coach at Harvard University, Bentley University, and Tufts University. He was the first head football coach at Mount Ida College, serving for one season in 1999. He is the founder of the Elite Football Clinics, LLC and Premier Football Consulting, LLC.

== Early life ==
In his youth, Papas played for the football team, the Red Raiders, at Watertown High School in Watertown, Massachusetts. He played college football at Springfield College in Springfield, Massachusetts, lettering for four years as a tight end. He received Eastern College Athletic Conference weekly honors three times his senior year.

== Coaching career ==
=== Bentley, Harvard and Tufts ===
Papas was an assistant coach at Bentley University (1992-1996), Harvard University (1997) and Tufts University (1998, 2000-2002). While at Bentley, Papas was the recruiting coordinator, special teams coordinator and eventually the associate head coach. Those teams had great success, including from 1993 to 1995, when the Falcons won 30 straight, the longest winning streak in the country at that time and the second longest streak by a New England team in the last 100 years. While at Harvard in 1997 as the wide receiver coach, the Crimson won the 1997 Ivy League Title. As the special teams coordinator at Tufts, the Jumbos compiled a 18-14 record, including a 7-1 finish in 1998.

=== Mount Ida ===
Papas was the first head football coach at Mount Ida College in Newton, Massachusetts and filled the post for the 1999 season when the team accumulated a record of 3–5. After the first year, long-time head football coach Ed Sweeney took over the program. The first game played by the school was a 36–15 victory over Western New England College played on September 11, 1999.

=== Buckingham Browne & Nichols ===
Papas was the head football coach at Buckingham Browne & Nichols School (BB&N), in Cambridge, Massachusetts for 11 seasons, from 2003 to 2013. The BB&N Knights compete in the Independent School League (ISL). Under Papas, the Knights participated in New England prep school bowl games in 2005, 2006, 2008 and 2010, winning New England prep championships in 2005, 2006 and 2008. In 2008, the Knights went undefeated and were the ISL champions. In 2009 and 2010, the Knights finished 7-1 both years in the ISL and were later named ISL Champions, after Lawrence Academy was stripped of their titles for league sanctions. In February 2010, eight BB&N Knights footballers were signed by college football teams, five with NCAA Division I schools. In the fall of 2010, BB&N had 7 alumni playing Ivy League football, the most of any high school in the country.

Papas retired from coaching in 2014.

=== Honors ===
In 2018, Papas was elected to the Massachusetts High School Football Coaches Hall of Fame. In 2022, he was elected to the New England Football Coaches Hall of Fame and had a bowl game named in his honor. In 2011, the NEPSAC Championship baseball team from 1987 in which he was the head coach was inducted in the Beaver Country Day School Hall of Fame

=== Elite Football Clinics ===
Papas is the founder of the Elite Football Clinic, a training camp for high school players to be coached and recruited by national programs. It was the first camp of its kind ever run. In June 2019, more than 2500 footballers from 43 states attended Elite clinics at Tufts University, Pomona College, and Christopher Columbus High School, making it the biggest football camp in the country. In 2025, 14 current NFL coaches and front office people were former Elite Football Clinic Coaches, including Lou Anarumo (Colts), Shane Waldron (Jaguars), Liam Coen (Jaguars), George Godsey (Ravens) and Chris Shea (Chiefs). He occasionally comments on football in the media.

=== The LEAGUE ===
Papas is the founder and director of The Elite High School Football League, aka The LEAGUE. The LEAGUE was founded in 2021 during the COVID-19 pandemic and has continued to grow throughout New England. It is one of the only independent football leagues in the country and allows high school players to play more football outside of their fall seasons, thus affording them more recruiting opportunities.

== Head coaching record ==
Year	Team	Overall	Conference	Standing	Bowl/playoffs
Mount Ida Mustangs (NCAA Division III independent) (1999)
1999	Mount Ida	3–4			
Mount Ida:		3–4			
Total:		3–4			
