= 2012 Wartburg Knights football team =

American college football season

2012 Wartburg Knights football
- Conference: Iowa Intercollegiate Athletic Conference
- Record: 6–4 (4–3 IIAC)
- Head coach: Rick Willis (14th season)
- Offensive coordinator: Matt Wheeler (3th season)
- Defensive coordinator: Chris Winter (2th season)
- Home stadium: Walston-Hoover Stadium

2012 Iowa Intercollegiate Athletic Conference football standings
	Conf.			Overall
Team	W		L	W		L
No. 15 Coe $^	7	–	0	10	–	1
Simpson (IA)	4	–	3	6	–	4
Wartburg	4	–	3	6	–	4
Central (IA)	4	–	3	5	–	5
Dubuque	4	–	3	5	–	5
Buena Vista	4	–	3	4	–	6
Loras	1	–	6	2	–	8
Luther	0	–	7	0	–	10
$ – Conference champion; ^ – NCAA Division III playoff participant; Rankings from D3football.com

The 2012 Wartburg Knights football team represented Wartburg College as a member of the Iowa Intercollegiate Athletic Conference (IIAC) during the 2012 NCAA Division III football season. Led by Rick Willis in his 14th season as head coach, the Knights compiled an overall record of 6–4 with a mark of 4–3 in conference play. Wartburg finished tied for second in the conference standings. The team played home games at Walston-Hoover Stadium in Waverly, Iowa.

== Schedule ==
Wartburg's 2012 regular season scheduled consisted of five home and five away games.

Date	Time	Opponent	Site	Result	Attendance
September 1	7:00 p.m.	MacMurry*	Walston-Hoover Stadium; Waverly, IA	W 73–0	3,100
September 8	1:00 p.m.	No. 15 Bethel (MN)*	Walston-Hoover Stadium; Waverly, IA	L 0–21	3,500
September 15	1:00 p.m.	at Carthage*	Art Keller Stadium; Kenosha, WI	W 27–3	1,325
September 29	1:00 p.m.	at Simpson	Buxton Stadium; Indianola, IA	L 19–20	2,438
October 6	1:00 p.m.	at Buena Vista	J. Leslie Rollins; Storm Lake, IA	W 42–21	2,800
October 13	1:00 p.m.	Luther	Walston-Hoover Stadium; Waverly, IA	W 24–10	3,600
October 20	1:30 p.m.	Dubuque^{†}	Walston-Hoover Stadium; Waverly, IA	W 34–31	4,200
October 27	1:00 p.m.	at No. 19 Coe	Clark Field; Cedar Rapids, IA	L 7–35	3,583
November 3	1:00 p.m.	at Central (IA)	Schipper Stadium; Pella, IA	L 28–31	1,500
November 10	1:00 p.m.	Loras	Walston-Hoover Stadium; Waverly, IA	W 55–7	3,500
*Non-conference game; ^{†}Homecoming; Rankings from D3Football.com Poll released prior to the game; All times are in Central time
