= 2016 Wartburg Knights football team =

American college football season

2016 Wartburg Knights football
- Conference: Iowa Intercollegiate Athletic Conference
- Record: 6–4 (5–3 IIAC)
- Head coach: Rick Willis (18th season)
- Offensive coordinator: Matt Wheeler (7th season)
- Defensive coordinator: Chris Winter (6th season)
- Home stadium: Walston-Hoover Stadium

2016 Iowa Intercollegiate Athletic Conference football standings
	Conf.			Overall
Team	W		L	W		L
No. 17 Coe $^	8	–	0	11	–	1
Central (IA)	6	–	2	8	–	2
Dubuque	6	–	2	8	–	2
Wartburg	5	–	3	6	–	4
Nebraska Wesleyan	3	–	5	4	–	6
Buena Vista	3	–	5	3	–	7
Luther	2	–	6	3	–	7
Simpson (IA)	2	–	6	3	–	7
Loras	1	–	7	1	–	9
$ – Conference champion; ^ – NCAA Division III playoff participant; Rankings from D3football.com

The 2016 Wartburg Knights football team represented Wartburg College as a member of the Iowa Intercollegiate Athletic Conference (IIAC) during the 2016 NCAA Division III football season. Led by Rick Willis in his 18th season as head coach, the Knights compiled an overall record of 6–4 with a mark of 5–3 in conference play, placing fourth in the IIAC. The team played home games at Walston-Hoover Stadium in Waverly, Iowa.

== Schedule ==
Wartburg's 2016 regular season scheduled consisted of five home and five away games.

Date	Time	Opponent	Site	Result	Attendance	Source
September 10	1:00 p.m.	at Monmouth (IL)*	Zorn Stadium; Monmouth, IL	L 22–29	2,200	
September 17	1:00 p.m.	at Nebraska Wesleyan	Abel Stadium; Lincoln, NE	W 38–28	721	
September 24	1:00 p.m.	Finlandia*	Walston-Hoover Stadium; Waverly, IA	W 56–0	2,500	
October 1	1:00 p.m.	at Coe	Clark Field; Cedar Rapids, IA	L 34–37	3,819	
October 8	1:00 p.m.	at Loras	Walston-Hoover Stadium; Waverly, IA	W 38–30	2,500	
October 15	1:30 p.m.	Simpson^{†}	Walston-Hoover Stadium; Waverly, IA	W 20–6	5,500	
October 22	1:00 p.m.	at Central (IA)	Schipper Stadium; Pella, IA	L 37–51	2,500	
October 29	1:00 p.m.	at Dubuque	Chalmers Field; Dubuque, IA	W 43–35	3,119	
November 5	1:00 p.m.	Luther	Walston-Hoover Stadium; Waverly, IA	L 27–28 ^{OT}	2,500	
November 12	1:00 p.m.	Buena Vista	Walston-Hoover Stadium; Waverly, IA	W 47–20	2,700	
*Non-conference game; ^{†}Homecoming; All times are in Central time

== Awards and honors ==
All-Conference
Player	Position	Team	Year
Tony Anstoetter	LB	1	JR
Jake Pisarik	P	1	JR
Dalton Ciavarelli	DL	2	SR
Sawyer Anderson	DB	2	SR
Quincy Griffith	OL	2	SR
Matt Sacia	QB	2	SO
Riley Brockway	WR	2	JR
Riley Brockway	RS	2	JR
HM = Honorable mention. Reference:
