= 2008 Wartburg Knights football team =

American college football season

2008 Wartburg Knights football

IIAC champion

NCAA Division III Quarterfinal, L 17–34 vs. Wisconsin–Whitewater
- Conference: Iowa Intercollegiate Athletic Conference

Ranking
- AFCA: No. 11
- D3Football.com: No. 10
- Record: 10–3 (7–1 IIAC)
- Head coach: Rick Willis (10th season)
- Offensive coordinator: Tim Morrison (1st season)
- Defensive coordinator: Joel Dettwiler (1st season)
- Home stadium: Walston-Hoover Stadium

2008 Iowa Intercollegiate Athletic Conference football standings
	Conf.			Overall
Team	W		L	W		L
No. 10 Wartburg $^	7	–	1	10	–	3
Buena Vista	6	–	2	7	–	3
Simpson (IA)	5	–	3	7	–	3
Loras	5	–	3	6	–	4
Central (IA)	4	–	4	6	–	4
Luther	4	–	4	5	–	5
Coe	4	–	4	4	–	6
Dubuque	1	–	7	2	–	8
Cornell (IA)	0	–	8	0	–	10
$ – Conference champion; ^ – NCAA Division III playoff participant; Rankings from D3football.com

The 2008 Wartburg Knights football team represented Wartburg College as a member of the Iowa Intercollegiate Athletic Conference (IIAC) during the 2008 NCAA Division III football season. The Knights were led by Rick Willis in his 10th season as head coach, and first season back after transitioning to athletic director following the 2005 season. The Knights compiled an overall record of 10–3 with a mark of 7–1 in conference play, finishing atop the IIAC for the 11th time and first since time since 2004. They earned the conference's automatic bid to the NCAA Division III Football Championship playoffs, losing at home to the eventual national runner-up Wisconsin–Whitewater in the quarterfinal round . The team played home games at Walston-Hoover Stadium in Waverly, Iowa.

== Schedule ==
Wartburg's 2008 regular season scheduled consisted of five home and five away games.

Date	Time	Opponent	Rank	Site	Result	Attendance
September 6	1:00 p.m.	St. Norbert*	No. 23	Walston-Hoover Stadium; Waverly, IA	W 44–20	3,200
September 13	1:00 p.m.	at Augsburg*	No. 20	Edor Nelson Field; Minneapolis, MN	L 24–30 ^{OT}	1,024
September 20	1:00 p.m.	at No. 9 Central (IA)		Schipper Stadium; Pella, IA	W 20–17	3,000
September 27	1:00 p.m.	Cornell (IA)	No. 22	Walston-Hoover Stadium; Waverly, IA	W 34–14	4,200
October 4	1:00 p.m.	at Buena Vista	No. 22	J. Leslie Rollins Stadium; Storm Lake, IA	L 21–26	4,200
October 11	1:00 p.m.	at Coe		Clark Field; Cedar Rapids, IA	W 27–21	3,383
October 18	1:00 p.m.	Loras		Walston-Hoover Stadium; Waverly, IA	W 35–7	4,600
October 25	1:00 p.m.	at Simpson		Buxton Stadium; Indianola, IA	W 21–13	4000
November 1	1:00 p.m.	Luther		Walston-Hoover Stadium; Waverly, IA	W 14–0	3,800
November 8	1:00 p.m.	Dubuque		Walston-Hoover Stadium; Waverly, IA	W 20–13 ^{OT}	1,200
November 22	12:00 p.m.	No. 9 Wisconsin-Stevens Point*		Community Stadium; Stevens Point, WI (NCAA Division III First Round)	W 26–21	1,149
November 29	12:00 p.m.	No. 22 Monmouth (IL)*		April Zorn Memorial Stadium; Monmouth, IL (NCAA Division III Second Round)	W 30–28	1,752
December 6	12:00 p.m.	No. 4 Wisconsin–Whitewater*		Perkins Stadium; Whitewater, WI (NCAA Division III Quarterfinal)	L 17–34	1,708
*Non-conference game; Rankings from D3Football.com Poll released prior to the game; All times are in Central time
