= 2011 Wartburg Knights football team =

American college football season

2011 Wartburg Knights football
- Conference: Iowa Intercollegiate Athletic Conference
- Record: 8–2 (6–2 IIAC)
- Head coach: Rick Willis (13th season)
- Offensive coordinator: Matt Wheeler (2nd season)
- Defensive coordinator: Chris Winter (1st season)
- Home stadium: Walston-Hoover Stadium

2011 Iowa Intercollegiate Athletic Conference football standings
	Conf.			Overall
Team	W		L	W		L
Dubuque $^	7	–	1	9	–	2
Wartburg	6	–	2	8	–	2
Central (IA)	6	–	2	7	–	3
Coe	6	–	2	6	–	4
Simpson (IA)	5	–	3	5	–	5
Luther	3	–	5	3	–	7
Buena Vista	2	–	6	2	–	8
Cornell (IA)	1	–	7	3	–	7
Loras	0	–	8	1	–	9
$ – Conference champion; ^ – NCAA Division III playoff participant

The 2011 Wartburg Knights football team represented Wartburg College as a member of the Iowa Intercollegiate Athletic Conference (IIAC) during the 2011 NCAA Division III football season. Led by Rick Willis in his 13th season as head coach, the Knights compiled an overall record of 8–2 with a mark of 6–2 in conference play, finishing second in the IIAC. Wartburg was unable to defend their conference title and missed a return trip to the NCAA Division III Football Championship playoffs. The team played home games at Walston-Hoover Stadium in Waverly, Iowa.

== Schedule ==
Wartburg's 2011 regular season scheduled consisted of five home and five away games.

Date	Time	Opponent	Rank	Site	Result	Attendance
September 3	1:00 p.m.	at Monmouth (IL)*	No. 15	Zorn Stadium; Monmouth, Il	W 35–28	1,860
September 10	7:00 p.m.	Gustavus Adolphus*	No. 14	Walston-Hoover Stadium; Waverly, IA	W 26–21	3,500
September 17	1:00 p.m.	Buena Vista	No. 13	Walston-Hoover Stadium; Waverly, IA	W 27–7	3,000
November 2	1:00 p.m.	Coe	No. 10	Walston-Hoover Stadium; Waverly, IA	L 24–27	5,000
October 1	1:00 p.m.	at Cornell (IA)	No. 22	Ash Park; Mount Vernon, IA	W 28–0	1,801
October 8	1:00 p.m.	at Dubuque	No. 20	Chalmers Field; Dubuque, IA	W 42–39	4,218
October 15	1:30 p.m.	Simpson^{†}	No. 20	Walston-Hoover Stadium; Waverly, IA	L 37–38 ^{OT}	758
October 29	1:00 p.m.	Central (IA)		Walston-Hoover Stadium; Waverly, IA	W 20–13	3,500
November 5	1:00 p.m.	at Loras		Rock Bowl; Dubuque, IA	W 23–14	2,500
November 12	12:00 p.m.	at Luther		Carlson Stadium; Decorah, IA	W 24–21	2,734
*Non-conference game; ^{†}Homecoming; Rankings from D3Football.com Poll released prior to the game; All times are in Central time
