= National Club Football Association =

North American athletic organization

- Current season, competition or edition: 2026
- Sport: American football
- Founded: 2010; 16 years ago
- First season: 2010
- No. of teams: 14
- Most recent champion: Ohio State* (2025)
- Most titles: Ohio State* (4)
- Website: https://www.ncfafootball.org

The National Club Football Association (NCFA) is an association of collegiate American football teams. It is a member of CollClubSports and manages the NCFA National Championship.

NCFA teams are typically operated by student sports clubs rather than faculty, and do not formally form part of a school's intercollegiate athletic program. The clubs can be based at any post-secondary college or university provided the institution in question agrees to officially recognize football as a club sport. In contrast the Intercollegiate Club Football Federation (ICFF) recognized, in addition to the above, student clubs without official recognition and independent programs that combine students at multiple schools that would otherwise be unable to play college football (the NCFA allows its members to play such independent teams but does not allow those teams to contest for the championship). A number of clubs had membership in both the ICFF and NCFA, especially in the midwest and south (only in the Northeast, where the ICFF's Yankee conference expelled several NCFA member teams in 2015, was there a major distinction between the two; the Yankee conference last played in 2016, with its remaining members either folding or joining the NCFA).

From 2012 through 2015, the NCFA National Championship Game was held at Salem Football Stadium in Salem, Virginia, which had also been the site of the NCAA Division III Football Championship. From 2016 through 2019, the NCFA National Championship Game was held at West Family Stadium on the campus of West Liberty University in Wheeling, West Virginia. In 2021 and 2022, the NCFA National Championship Game was moved to Waynesburg University at John F. Wiley Stadium. After one season at UPMC Graham Field in 2023, the title game returned to Waynesburg University in 2024. In 2025, the NCFA National Championship game was set to be hosted by the University of Toledo at the Glass Bowl. However, due to significant snow in the area, the game was moved to Mulhollan Field on the campus of Wright State University.

The 2020 Fall season was cancelled due to the COVID-19 pandemic.

== Active Member Schools ==
The organization has 14 active clubs for the 2025 season. All current members are located east of the Mississippi River, primarily in the East Coast and Great Lakes regions of the United States. All but three programs are at public institutions; Loyola Chicago and Sacred Heart are private Catholic universities while Clarkson is a private nonsectarian university.

Institution	Location	Founded	Affiliation	Enrollment	Nickname	Joined	Colors
Great Lakes - East Division
Ohio State University	Columbus, Ohio	1870	Public	61,369	Buckeyes	2012	
University of Toledo	Toledo, Ohio	1872	Public	18,319	Rockets	2021	
Wright State University	Fairborn, Ohio	1964	Public	17,074	Raiders	2010	
Great Lakes - West Division
Loyola University Chicago	Chicago, Illinois	1870	Private (Catholic, Jesuit)	16,437	Ramblers	2012	
University of Wisconsin–Milwaukee	Milwaukee, Wisconsin	1956	Public	33,502	Panthers	2013	
Oakland University	Auburn Hills, Michigan	1957	Public	20,519	Golden Grizzlies	2013	
Michigan State University	East Lansing, Michigan	1855	Public	49,695	Spartans	2015	
North Atlantic Division
Clarkson University	Potsdam, New York	1896	Private (Nonsectarian)	2,848	Golden Knights	2012	
Coppin State University	Baltimore, Maryland	1900	Public	2,724	Eagles	2012	
George Mason University	Fairfax, Virginia	1957	Public	35,047	Patriots	2011	
Sacred Heart University	Fairfield, Connecticut	1963	Private (Catholic, diocesan)	5,974	Pioneers	2015	
University of Vermont	Burlington, Vermont	1791	Public	12,164	Catamounts	2010	
South Atlantic Division
Columbus State University	Columbus, Georgia	1958	Public	7,925	Cougars	2011	
University of South Carolina	Columbia, South Carolina	1801	Public	35,388	Gamecocks	2010	

Of the 14 active member schools for the 2025 season, five (Michigan State, Ohio State, South Carolina, Sacred Heart, Toledo) have parent NCAA programs. The remaining 9 teams operate as their schools' only active football programs, despite not being sponsored by their respective athletic departments.

=== Former members ===
The NCFA has 52 former, or inactive, member clubs. Several former programs moved to other collegiate football athletic organizations.

Institution	Location	Founded	Affiliation	Enrollment	Nickname	Joined	Left	Current conference
University of Alabama	Tuscaloosa, Alabama	1820	Public	38,320	Crimson Tide	2013	2013	Folded
Appalachian State University	Boone, North Carolina	1899	Public	20,641	Mountaineers	2019	2019	Folded
The Apprentice School	Newport News, Virginia	1919	Private (Vocational)	725	Builders	2018	2018	USCAA
Central Connecticut State University	New Britain, Connecticut	1849	Public	9,653	Blue Devils	2015	2016	Folded
Central Georgia Technical College	Macon, Georgia	1962	Public (Community/Technical)	3,896	Titans	2022	2024	NJCAA
Chattahoochee Technical College	Marietta, Georgia	1963	Public	14,000	Golden Eagles	2010	2012	Folded
Clayton State University	Morrow, Georgia	1969	Public	6,900	Lakers	2024	2025	NSAC
Clemson University	Clemson, South Carolina	1889	Public	28,466	Tigers	2010	2011	Folded
University of Colorado Colorado Springs	Colorado Springs, Colorado	1965	Public	12,753	Mountain Lions	2019	2019	Folded
Community Christian College Georgia	Norcross, Georgia	1994	Private (Christian)	490	Knights	2018	2018	Independent
DePaul University	Chicago, Illinois	1898	Private (Catholic)	38,320	Blue Demons	2015	2015	Folded
Eastern Connecticut State University	Willimantic, Connecticut	1889	Public	4,125	Warriors	2012	2022	Folded
Eastern Michigan University	Ypsilanti, Michigan	1849	Public	15,370	Eagles	2017	2019	Folded
University of Florida	Gainesville, Florida	1853	Public	56,567	Gators	2017	2018	Folded
Florida Gulf Coast University	Fort Myers, Florida	1991	Public	15,373	Eagles	2018	2019	Folded
University of Fort Lauderdale	Lauderhill, Florida	1995	Private (Christian, (non-denominational)	192	Eagles	2017	2020	NCCAA
Gordon State College	Barnesville, Georgia	1872	Public	4,555	Highlanders	2021	2025	NSAC
University of Hartford	Hartford, Connecticut	1957	Private (Nonsectarian)	5,740	Hawks	2015	2018	Folded
Holland College	Charlottetown, Prince Edward Island, Canada	1969	Public	2,600	Holland Hurricanes	2013	2013	Atlantic Football League
Johnson & Wales University	Providence, Rhode Island	1914	Private (Nonsectarian)	5,676	Wildcats	2018	2018	Folded
Kennesaw State University	Kennesaw, Georgia	1963	Public	41,181	Owls	2012	2016	Folded
Lander University	Greenwood, South Carolina	1872	Public	4,167	Bearcats	2017	2017	Folded
Longwood University	Farmville, Virginia	1839	Public	4,470	Lancers	2010	2024	Folded
Macon State College	Macon, Georgia	1965	Public	N/A	Blue Storm	2012	2013	Merged with Middle Georgia College to become MGSU
University of Maine	Orono, Maine	1865	Public	11,561	Black Bears	2010	2012	Folded
University of Maryland Eastern Shore	Princess Anne, Maryland	1886	Public	2,333	Shore Hawks	2012	2016	Folded
Metropolitan State University of Denver	Denver, Colorado	1965	Public	15,682	Roadrunners	2016	2016	Folded
Miami University	Oxford, Ohio	1809	Public	24,377	RedHawks	2011	2022	Folded
University of Michigan–Flint	Flint, Michigan	1956	Public	6,418	Wolverines	2010; 2013	2010; 2017	Folded
Middle Georgia State University	Macon, Georgia	1884	Public	7,885	Knights	2012	2020	Folded
University of New Orleans	New Orleans, Louisiana	1956	Public	8,231	Privateers	2010	2012	Folded
University of North Carolina at Chapel Hill	Chapel Hill, North Carolina	1789	Public	20,029	Tar Heels	2010	2011	Folded
University of North Carolina at Greensboro	Greensboro, North Carolina	1891	Public	19,764	Spartans	2016	2022	Folded
Old Dominion University	Norfolk, Virginia	1930	Public	24,286	Monarchs	2012	2013	Folded
Onondaga Community College	Syracuse, New York	1961	Public	7,320	Lazers	2012	2013	Folded
Orangeburg–Calhoun Technical College	Orangeburg, South Carolina	1968	Public	2,100	Wildcats	2011	2015	Folded
University of Pittsburgh	Pittsburgh, Pennsylvania	1787	Public	28,391	Panthers	2016	2023	Folded
Radford University	Radford, Virginia	1910	Public	10,700	Highlanders	2010	2015	Folded
University of Rio Grande	Rio Grande, Ohio	1876	Private (Nonsectarian)	2,300	Red Storm	2010	2010	Folded
Robert Morris University - Peoria	Peoria, Illinois	2000	Private (Nonsectarian)	N/A	Eagles	2013	2016	Folded, University later closed in 2021
Rollins College	Winter Park, Florida	1885	Private (Nonsectarian)	3,127	Tars	2011; 2016	2013; 2018	Folded
Roosevelt University	Chicago, Illinois	1872	Private (Nonsectarian)	3,725	Lakers	2018	2018	Folded
Shepherd Bible College						2012	2012	College Closed
University of South Alabama	Mobile, Alabama	1963	Public	15,193	Jaguars	2010	2010	Folded
Southern Illinois University Edwardsville	Edwardsville, Illinois	1957	Public	12,860	Cougars	2011	2019	Folded
University of Texas at Arlington	Arlington, Texas	1895	Public	40,990	Mavericks	2010	2010	Folded
Texas State University	San Marcos, Texas	1899	Public	38,231	Bobcats	2013	2013	Folded
Texas Tech University	Lubbock, Texas	1923	Public	40,528	Red Raiders	2010	2010	Folded
Tusculum University	Tusculum University	1794	Private (Presbyterian)	1,400	Pioneers	2014	2014	Folded
Virginia Commonwealth University	Richmond, Virginia	1838	Public	28,919	Rams	2011	2012	Folded
University of Wisconsin–Parkside	Somers, Wisconsin	1968	Public	4,000	Rangers	2013	2013	Folded
Xavier University	Cincinnati, Ohio	1831	Private (Catholic)	6,129	Musketeers	2011	2012	Folded

== NCFA National Championship ==
The NCFA National Championship Bowl is the final game of the National Club Football Association season, pitting the semi-finalists of the NCFA Playoffs against one another. From 2012 to 2014, the game featured the top-two teams in the country as determined by the NCFA Coaches Poll and Power Rankings. Starting in 2015, the NCFA instituted an eight-team playoff, which featured four conference championship games. Those four winners would determine the semifinalists before the championship was played.

The 2019 NCFA National Championship Bowl Game between Ohio State University and Oakland University featured the first simulcast of the event, with the game being broadcast live on both video and radio outlets. The Buckeyes won the game, 36–9, over the Golden Grizzlies.

Following the canceled 2020 season, the 2021 NCFA National Championship Bowl Game featured the top two teams in the league's final Power Rankings rather than a playoff due to lingering financial effects felt by the COVID-19 pandemic. In addition, the location of the game was moved to Waynesburg University, a more centralized location for the remaining teams in the league. Ohio State went on to beat George Mason University 42-27, to capture their second national championship.

Beginning in 2022, the NCFA reinstated the playoff system after realigning the league into three conferences. The three conference champions and one at-large team are now eligible for a four-team playoff. The at-large team is the highest ranked non-conference champion in the final NCFA Power Rankings. Gordon State would go on to defeat Ohio State in the National Championship game 35-15 in the first year of the realigned league.

Following the dissolution of more NCFA programs following the 2024 season, the NCFA realigned the remaining 14 teams into two major conferences – the Mid-Atlantic and the Great Lakes – and eliminated the semifinal round of its playoff with the two conference champions participating in the national championship game. Coppin State, champions of the Mid-Atlantic and Ohio State, champions of the Great Lakes, met in the 2025 NCFA National Championship Game with Ohio State coming away with a 28-8 victory.

Year	Champion	Runner-up	Final Score	Venue	Location	Game MVP
2025	Ohio State	Coppin State	28-8	Mulhollan Field	Fairborn, Ohio	Ricardo Washington
2024	Ohio State	Clayton State	20-13	John F. Wiley Stadium	Waynesburg, Pennsylvania	Aidan Donovan
2023	Central Georgia Technical College	Ohio State	29-14	UPMC Graham Field	Pittsburgh, Pennsylvania	DeShawn Cumby
2022	Gordon State	Ohio State	35-15	John F. Wiley Stadium	Waynesburg, Pennsylvania	Cedrion Brundage
2021	Ohio State	George Mason	42-27	John F. Wiley Stadium	Waynesburg, Pennsylvania	Kellyn Gerenstein
2020	Cancelled due to COVID-19 pandemic					
2019	Ohio State	Oakland	36-9	West Family Stadium	Wheeling, West Virginia	Sam Frank
2018	Apprentice School	Oakland	56-14	West Family Stadium	Wheeling, West Virginia	Terrence Sudberry
2017	Sacred Heart	Fort Lauderdale	21-18	West Family Stadium	Wheeling, West Virginia	Jordan James
2016	Oakland	Middle Georgia State	24-14	West Family Stadium	Wheeling, West Virginia	Shakeer Williams
2015	Middle Georgia State	Miami (OH)	33-26	Salem Football Stadium	Salem, Virginia	Eric Forest
2014	Oakland	Robert Morris University – Peoria	14-12	Salem Football Stadium	Salem, Virginia	Brandon Tucker
2013	Coppin State	Middle Georgia State	38-13	Salem Football Stadium	Salem, Virginia	Gavin Hux
2012	Coppin State	Miami (OH)	41-17	Salem Football Stadium	Salem, Virginia	Antoine Goodson
2011*	Chattahoochee Technical College	N/A	N/A	N/A		
2010*	University of New Orleans	N/A	N/A	N/A		
*No championship game played. Champion determined by NCFA Coaches Poll.

== Yearly Postseason Awards ==
Starting in 2013, the National Club Football Association began awarding First, Second and Academic All-Americans. Starting in 2014, the league began naming award winners for Players of the Year on both sides of the football as well as the Head Coach of the Year. Starting in 2022, the NCFA added "Freshman of the Year" and "Assistant Coach of the Year" awards. Ohio State leads all schools with 11 postseason awards, followed by George Mason with six.

2025 NCFA Postseason Awards
Award	Recipient	Position	School
Offensive Player of the Year	Nicholas Pappas	Quarterback	The Ohio State University
Defensive Player of the Year	Trey Jones	Defensive End	The Ohio State University
Freshman of the Year	Tommy Roberts III	Cornerback	The Ohio State University
Coach of the Year	James Grega, Jr.	–	The Ohio State University
Assistant Coach of the Year	Byron McCarthy	Offensive Coordinator	Coppin State University

2024 NCFA Postseason Awards
Award	Recipient	Position	School
Offensive Player of the Year	Matthew Faulkner	Wide Receiver	Clayton State University
Defensive Player of the Year	Matthew Humphreys	Defensive End	The Ohio State University
Freshman of the Year	Lavell Lyles	All-Purpose	Wright State University
Coach of the Year	Franklyn Hererra	–	Coppin State University
Assistant Coach of the Year	Zac Saleski	Offensive Line	The Ohio State University

2023 NCFA Postseason Awards
Award	Recipient	Position	School
Offensive Player of the Year	Spencer Moore	Quarterback	The Ohio State University
Defensive Player of the Year	Ahmad Kareem	Defensive End	Michigan State University
Freshman of the Year	J'Ionta Jones	Defensive Tackle	Central Georgia Technical College
Coach of the Year	Terry Kendrick	–	Central Georgia Technical College
Assistant Coach of the Year	Dylan Barron	Defensive Coordinator	The Ohio State University

2022 NCFA Postseason Awards
Award	Recipient	Position	School
Offensive Player of the Year	Kellyn Gerenstein	Quarterback	The Ohio State University
Defensive Player of the Year	Antoine Johnson	Defensive Back	Gordon State College
Freshman of the Year	Cedrion Brundage	Running Back	Gordon State College
Coach of the Year	Jonathan Beach	–	Michigan State University
Assistant Coach of the Year	Tim Shelley II / Rod Brown	Co-Defensive Coordinators	Gordon State College

2021 NCFA Postseason Awards
Award	Recipient	Position	School
Offensive Player of the Year	Chase Soper	Quarterback	George Mason University
Defensive Player of the Year	Gabriel Gibson	Defensive End	George Mason University
Coach of the Year	Kevin Adkins	–	Gordon State College

2019 NCFA Postseason Awards
Award	Recipient	Position	School
Offensive Player of the Year	Kellyn Gerenstein	Quarterback	The Ohio State University
Defensive Player of the Year	Andrew Sebra	Defensive End	Oakland University
Coach of the Year	James Grega, Jr.	–	The Ohio State University

2018 NCFA Postseason Awards
Award	Recipient	Position	School
Offensive Player of the Year	Justin Fenical	Quarterback	George Mason University
Defensive Player of the Year	Devin Anderson	Defensive End	George Mason University
Coach of the Year	Rick Fracassa	–	Oakland University

2017 NCFA Postseason Awards
Award	Recipient	Position	School
Offensive Player of the Year	Willie Marrow	Wide Receiver	George Mason University
Defensive Player of the Year	Steven O'Connell	Defensive Back	Oakland University
Coach of the Year	Greg Jones	–	Sacred Heart University

2016 NCFA Postseason Awards
Award	Recipient	Position	School
Offensive Player of the Year	Will Kasser	Quarterback	Sacred Heart University
Defensive Player of the Year	Bobby Saad	Linebacker	Oakland University
Coach of the Year	Tom Menas	–	Oakland University

2015 NCFA Postseason Awards
Award	Recipient	Position	School
Offensive Player of the Year	Tyler Rus	Running Back	Miami (OH)
Defensive Player of the Year	Jimmy Neyhouse	Defensive Tackle	Wright State University
Coach of the Year	Daniel Mock	–	Middle Georgia State

2014 NCFA Postseason Awards
Award	Recipient	Position	School
Offensive Player of the Year	Sam Clark	Quarterback	UW–Milwaukee
Defensive Player of the Year	Ryan Sepulveda	Defensive End	George Mason University
Coach of the Year	John Clarke	–	Loyola (Chicago)
