= 2005 NCAA Division III football season =

American college football season

- Regular season: August – November 2005
- Playoffs: November – December 2005
- National championship: Salem Football Stadium; Salem, VA
- Champion: Mount Union (8)
- Gagliardi Trophy: Brett Elliott (QB), Linfield

The 2005 NCAA Division III football season, part of the college football season organized by the NCAA at the Division III level in the United States, began in August 2005, and concluded with the NCAA Division III Football Championship, also known as the Stagg Bowl, in December 2005 at Salem Football Stadium in Salem, Virginia. The Mount Union Purple Raiders won their eighth Division III championship by defeating the Wisconsin–Whitewater Warhawks, 35−28. This was the first of eight subsequent championship games between Mount Union (3 wins) and Wisconsin–Whitewater (5 wins); only the 2012 Stagg Bowl featured a different team.

The Gagliardi Trophy, given to the most outstanding player in Division III football, was awarded to Brett Elliott, quarterback from Linfield.

== Conference changes and new programs ==
School	2004 conference	2005 conference
Becker Hawks	No program	Independent
Chowan Hawks	USA South	Independent (Division II)

== Conference standings ==
2005 American Southwest Conference football standings
	Conf.			Overall
Team	W		L	W		L
No. 11 Mary Hardin–Baylor $^	7	–	1	9	–	2
Hardin–Simmons	7	–	2	8	–	2
Howard Payne	7	–	2	7	–	3
East Texas Baptist	6	–	3	6	–	4
Texas Lutheran	5	–	4	5	–	5
Louisiana College	4	–	4	4	–	5
McMurry	4	–	5	5	–	5
Sul Ross	2	–	7	3	–	7
Mississippi College	1	–	8	2	–	8
Austin	1	–	8	1	–	9
$ – Conference champion; ^ – NCAA Division III playoff participant; Rankings from D3football.com

2005 Atlantic Central Football Conference standings
	Conf.			Overall
Team	W		L	W		L
No. 10 Wesley +^	4	–	1	12	–	2
Salisbury +	4	–	1	8	–	3
Brockport +	4	–	1	5	–	5
Frostburg State	1	–	4	6	–	5
Apprentice §	1	–	4	4	–	6
Buffalo State	1	–	4	3	–	6
+ – Conference co-champions; ^ – NCAA Division III playoff participant; § – Not an NCAA member; Rankings from D3football.com

2005 Centennial Conference football standings
	Conf.			Overall
Team	W		L	W		L
Johns Hopkins $^	5	–	1	8	–	3
Franklin & Marshall	4	–	2	5	–	6
Dickinson	3	–	3	4	–	6
Gettysburg	3	–	3	4	–	6
McDaniel	2	–	4	5	–	5
Ursinus	2	–	4	4	–	6
Muhlenberg	2	–	4	3	–	7
$ – Conference champion; ^ – NCAA Division III playoff participant

2005 College Conference of Illinois and Wisconsin football standings
	Conf.			Overall
Team	W		L	W		L
No. 13 Augustana (IL) $^	7	–	0	10	–	2
No. 16 North Central (IL) ^	6	–	1	9	–	2
Carthage	4	–	3	7	–	3
Wheaton (IL)	4	–	3	7	–	3
Elmhurst	3	–	4	6	–	4
Millikin	2	–	5	5	–	5
Illinois Wesleyan	2	–	5	3	–	7
North Park	0	–	7	3	–	7
$ – Conference champion; ^ – NCAA Division III playoff participant; Rankings from D3football.com

2005 Empire 8 Athletic Conference football standings
	Conf.			Overall
Team	W		L	W		L
No. 24 Ithaca $^	6	–	0	8	–	3
Alfred	5	–	1	9	–	2
St. John Fisher	4	–	2	8	–	3
Utica	3	–	3	6	–	4
Springfield	2	–	4	4	–	6
Norwich	1	–	5	3	–	7
Hartwick	0	–	6	4	–	6
$ – Conference champion; ^ – NCAA Division III playoff participant; Rankings from D3football.com

2005 Heartland Collegiate Athletic Conference football standings
	Conf.			Overall
Team	W		L	W		L
Mount St. Joseph $^	5	–	1	9	–	2
Defiance	4	–	2	6	–	4
Anderson (IN)	3	–	3	5	–	5
Franklin (IN)	3	–	3	5	–	5
Hanover	3	–	3	4	–	6
Bluffton	2	–	4	3	–	7
Manchester	1	–	5	2	–	8
$ – Conference champion; ^ – NCAA Division III playoff participant

2005 Illini–Badger Football Conference standings
	Conf.			Overall
Team	W		L	W		L
Lakeland $^	7	–	0	8	–	3
Concordia (WI)	6	–	1	7	–	3
Aurora	5	–	2	5	–	5
Greenville	4	–	3	4	–	6
Benedictine (IL)	3	–	4	3	–	7
MacMurray	2	–	5	4	–	6
Eureka	1	–	6	1	–	9
Concordia (IL)	0	–	7	0	–	10
$ – Conference champion; ^ – NCAA Division III playoff participant

2005 Iowa Conference football standings
	Conf.			Overall
Team	W		L	W		L
No. 20 Central (IA) +^	7	–	1	9	–	2
No. 23 Coe +^	7	–	1	9	–	2
Wartburg	6	–	2	7	–	3
Luther	5	–	3	6	–	4
Buena Vista	4	–	4	5	–	5
Simpson (IA)	3	–	5	5	–	5
Loras	2	–	6	3	–	7
Cornell (IA)	1	–	7	2	–	8
Dubuque	1	–	7	2	–	8
+ – Conference co-champions; ^ – NCAA Division III playoff participant; Rankings from D3football.com

2005 Liberty League football standings
	Conf.			Overall
Team	W		L	W		L
No. 14 Union (NY) $^	7	–	0	11	–	1
No. 22 Hobart ^	6	–	1	9	–	2
RPI	5	–	2	8	–	2
WPI	4	–	3	6	–	3
Rochester (NY)	3	–	4	4	–	6
Merchant Marine	2	–	5	3	–	7
St. Lawrence	1	–	6	2	–	7
Coast Guard	0	–	7	2	–	7
$ – Conference champion; ^ – NCAA Division III playoff participant; Rankings from D3football.com

2005 Michigan Intercollegiate Athletic Association football standings
	Conf.			Overall
Team	W		L	W		L
Albion $^	6	–	1	7	–	4
Adrian	5	–	2	8	–	2
Hope	5	–	2	5	–	5
Alma	4	–	3	6	–	4
Olivet	4	–	3	5	–	5
Kalamazoo	3	–	4	4	–	6
Wisconsin Lutheran	1	–	6	1	–	9
Tri-State *	0	–	7	0	–	10
$ – Conference champion; ^ – NCAA Division III playoff participant; * – Provisional NCAA Division III member

2005 Middle Atlantic Conference football standings
	Conf.			Overall
Team	W		L	W		L
No. 6 Delaware Valley $^	9	–	0	12	–	1
Wilkes ^	8	–	1	8	–	3
Widener	6	–	3	8	–	3
Moravian	5	–	4	7	–	4
Lycoming	5	–	4	6	–	4
King's	5	–	4	5	–	5
Albright	4	–	5	5	–	5
FDU Florham	4	–	5	4	–	6
Lebanon Valley	2	–	7	2	–	8
Susquehanna	1	–	8	2	–	8
Juniata	0	–	9	0	–	10
$ – Conference champion; ^ – NCAA Division III playoff participant; Rankings from D3football.com

2005 Midwest Conference football standings
	Conf.			Overall
Team	W		L	W		L
Monmouth (IL) $^	9	–	0	10	–	1
St. Norbert	8	–	1	8	–	2
Carroll (WI)	6	–	3	6	–	4
Ripon	5	–	4	6	–	4
Beloit	5	–	4	5	–	5
Lawrence	4	–	5	4	–	5
Knox	3	–	6	4	–	6
Lake Forest	3	–	6	4	–	6
Illinois College	2	–	7	3	–	7
Grinnell	0	–	9	1	–	9
$ – Conference champion; ^ – NCAA Division III playoff participant

2005 Minnesota Intercollegiate Athletic Conference football standings
	Conf.			Overall
Team	W		L	W		L
No. 7 Saint John's (MN) $^	8	–	0	11	–	1
No. 8 Concordia–Moorhead ^	7	–	1	10	–	2
St. Olaf	6	–	2	8	–	2
Bethel (MN)	4	–	4	5	–	5
St. Thomas (MN)	4	–	4	4	–	5
Gustavus Adolphus	3	–	5	3	–	7
Carleton	2	–	6	4	–	6
Hamline	1	–	7	3	–	7
Augsburg	1	–	7	1	–	9
$ – Conference champion; ^ – NCAA Division III playoff participant; Rankings from D3football.com

2005 New England Football Conference standings
	Conf.			Overall
Team	W		L	W		L
Bogan Division
Fitchburg State xy	6	–	0	8	–	3
Bridgewater State	5	–	1	9	–	1
Maine Maritime	4	–	2	7	–	3
Worcester State	3	–	3	5	–	5
Westfield State	2	–	4	4	–	5
Framingham State	1	–	5	2	–	7
Massachusetts Maritime	0	–	6	0	–	9
Boyd Division
Curry xy$^	6	–	0	9	–	3
Endicott	5	–	1	7	–	3
UMass Dartmouth	4	–	2	5	–	5
MIT	2	–	4	3	–	6
Western New England	2	–	4	3	–	6
Salve Regina	2	–	4	2	–	6
Nichols	0	–	6	0	–	9
Championship: Curry 17, Fitchburg State 14
$ – Conference champion; x – Division champion/co-champions; y – Championship game participant; ^ – NCAA Division III playoff participant

2005 New England Small College Athletic Conference football standings
	Conf.			Overall
Team	W		L	W		L
No. 25 Trinity (CT) $	8	–	0	8	–	0
Colby	7	–	1	7	–	1
Bowdoin	6	–	2	6	–	2
Williams	6	–	2	6	–	2
Amherst	5	–	3	5	–	3
Middlebury	3	–	5	3	–	5
Bates	2	–	6	2	–	6
Tufts	2	–	6	2	–	6
Hamilton	1	–	7	1	–	7
Wesleyan	0	–	8	0	–	8
$ – Conference champion; Rankings from D3football.com

2005 New Jersey Athletic Conference football standings
	Conf.			Overall
Team	W		L	W		L
No. 4 Rowan +^	5	–	1	11	–	2
Cortland +^	5	–	1	7	–	3
Montclair State	4	–	2	5	–	5
Western Connecticut	3	–	3	6	–	4
Kean	2	–	4	4	–	6
William Paterson	1	–	5	5	–	5
TCNJ	1	–	5	3	–	7
+ – Conference co-champions; ^ – NCAA Division III playoff participant; Rankings from D3football.com

2005 North Coast Athletic Conference football standings
	Conf.			Overall
Team	W		L	W		L
No. 15 Wabash $^	7	–	0	11	–	1
Kenyon	6	–	1	6	–	4
Oberlin	5	–	2	7	–	3
Wittenberg	5	–	2	5	–	5
Wooster	3	–	4	6	–	4
Denison	3	–	4	5	–	5
Allegheny	3	–	4	3	–	7
Ohio Wesleyan	2	–	5	3	–	7
Earlham	1	–	6	1	–	9
Hiram	0	–	7	1	–	9
$ – Conference champion; ^ – NCAA Division III playoff participant; Rankings from D3football.com

2005 Northwest Conference football standings
	Conf.			Overall
Team	W		L	W		L
No. 3 Linfield $^	4	–	0	10	–	1
Willamette	3	–	1	5	–	4
Whitworth	2	–	2	5	–	3
Puget Sound	1	–	3	4	–	5
Pacific Lutheran	0	–	4	3	–	6
Lewis & Clark *	0	–	0	0	–	4
$ – Conference champion; ^ – NCAA Division III playoff participant; * – Lewis & Clark's conference games were canceled.; Rankings from D3football.com

2005 Ohio Athletic Conference football standings
	Conf.			Overall
Team	W		L	W		L
No. 1 Mount Union $^	8	–	1	14	–	1
No. 18 Ohio Northern	7	–	2	8	–	2
No. 5 Capital ^	7	–	2	10	–	3
John Carroll	6	–	3	7	–	3
Otterbein	6	–	3	7	–	3
Marietta	4	–	5	5	–	5
Baldwin–Wallace	3	–	6	4	–	6
Muskingum	2	–	7	2	–	8
Wilmington (OH)	2	–	7	2	–	8
Heidelberg	0	–	9	0	–	10
$ – Conference champion; ^ – NCAA Division III playoff participant; Rankings from D3football.com

2005 Old Dominion Athletic Conference football standings
	Conf.			Overall
Team	W		L	W		L
No. 12 Bridgewater $^	6	–	0	10	–	2
Hampden–Sydney	4	–	2	8	–	2
Washington and Lee	4	–	2	7	–	3
Guilford	4	–	2	5	–	5
Catholic University	1	–	5	2	–	8
Randolph–Macon	1	–	5	2	–	8
Emory & Henry	1	–	5	1	–	9
$ – Conference champion; ^ – NCAA Division III playoff participant; Rankings from D3football.com

2005 Presidents' Athletic Conference football standings
	Conf.			Overall
Team	W		L	W		L
No. 17 Thiel $^	6	–	0	11	–	1
No. 21 Washington & Jefferson ^	5	–	1	9	–	2
Thomas More	4	–	2	5	–	5
Waynesburg	2	–	4	4	–	6
Westminster (PA)	2	–	4	4	–	6
Grove City	2	–	4	3	–	7
Bethany (WV)	0	–	6	1	–	9
$ – Conference champion; ^ – NCAA Division III playoff participant; Rankings from D3football.com

2005 Southern California Intercollegiate Athletic Conference football standings
	Conf.			Overall
Team	W		L	W		L
No. 9 Occidental $^	6	–	0	9	–	1
Cal Lutheran	5	–	1	8	–	1
Redlands	4	–	2	5	–	4
La Verne	3	–	3	5	–	4
Pomona–Pitzer	2	–	4	4	–	5
Claremont–Mudd–Scripps	1	–	5	3	–	6
Whittier	0	–	6	2	–	7
$ – Conference champion; ^ – NCAA Division III playoff participant; Rankings from D3football.com

2005 Southern Collegiate Athletic Conference football standings
	Conf.			Overall
Team	W		L	W		L
No. 19 Trinity (TX) +^	5	–	0	9	–	1
DePauw +	5	–	0	7	–	2
Sewanee	4	–	2	5	–	5
Centre	3	–	3	7	–	3
Rose–Hulman	2	–	4	5	–	5
Millsaps	1	–	5	2	–	7
Rhodes	0	–	6	2	–	8
+ – Conference co-champions; ^ – NCAA Division III playoff participant; Rankings from D3football.com

2005 University Athletic Association football standings
	Conf.			Overall
Team	W		L	W		L
Chicago $	3	–	0	5	–	4
Washington University	2	–	1	6	–	4
Carnegie Mellon	1	–	2	5	–	5
Case Western Reserve	0	–	3	3	–	7
$ – Conference champion

2005 Upper Midwest Athletic Conference football standings
	Conf.			Overall
Team	W		L	W		L
North
Northwestern (MN) xy$#	7	–	0	8	–	3
Martin Luther	6	–	1	6	–	3
Minnesota–Morris #	4	–	3	4	–	6
Crown #	3	–	4	3	–	6
Trinity Bible §	0	–	7	1	–	8
South
Rockford x	5	–	2	7	–	3
Westminster (MO) xy	5	–	2	5	–	5
Maranatha Baptist	2	–	5	4	–	5
Blackburn	2	–	5	2	–	8
Principia	1	–	6	1	–	8
Championship: Northwestern (MN) 27, Westminster (MO) 7
$ – Conference champion; x – Division champion/co-champions; y – Championship game participant; # – Provisional NCAA Division III member § – Not an NCAA member

2005 USA South Athletic Conference football standings
	Conf.			Overall
Team	W		L	W		L
Ferrum +^	6	–	1	9	–	2
Methodist +	6	–	1	8	–	2
Averett	5	–	2	7	–	3
Christopher Newport	5	–	2	6	–	4
North Carolina Wesleyan	3	–	4	4	–	6
Maryville (TN)	2	–	5	3	–	7
Greensboro	1	–	6	2	–	8
Shenandoah	0	–	7	2	–	8
+ – Conference co-champions; ^ – NCAA Division III playoff participant

2005 Wisconsin Intercollegiate Athletic Conference football standings
	Conf.			Overall
Team	W		L	W		L
No. 2 Wisconsin–Whitewater $^	7	–	0	14	–	1
Wisconsin–Eau Claire	5	–	2	6	–	4
Wisconsin–Oshkosh	4	–	3	7	–	3
Wisconsin–La Crosse	4	–	3	5	–	4
Wisconsin–Stout	3	–	4	6	–	4
Wisconsin–Stevens Point	3	–	4	4	–	6
Wisconsin–River Falls	2	–	5	3	–	7
Wisconsin–Platteville	0	–	7	1	–	9
$ – Conference champion; ^ – NCAA Division III playoff participant; Rankings from D3football.com

2005 NCAA Division III independents football records
	Conf.			Overall
Team	W		L	W		L
Huntingdon		–		7	–	2
Husson		–		4	–	4
Plymouth State		–		4	–	6
Chapman		–		2	–	7
Colorado College		–		2	–	8
Mount Ida		–		1	–	9
Becker		–		0	–	8
Macalester		–		0	–	9
Menlo		–		0	–	10

== Conference champions ==
Conference champions
- American Southwest Conference – Mary Hardin–Baylor
- Atlantic Central Football Conference – SUNY Brockport, Salisbury, and Wesley
- Centennial Conference – Johns Hopkins
- College Conference of Illinois and Wisconsin – Augustana (IL)
- Empire 8 Conference – Ithaca
- Heartland Collegiate Athletic Conference – Mount St. Joseph
- Illini-Badger Football Conference – Lakeland
- Iowa Intercollegiate Athletic Conference – Central (IA) and Coe
- Liberty League – Union (NY)
- Michigan Intercollegiate Athletic Association – Albion
- Middle Atlantic Conference – Delaware Valley
- Midwest Conference – Monmouth (IL)
- Minnesota Intercollegiate Athletic Conference – Saint John's (MN)
- New England Football Conference – Fitchburg State (Bogan Division), Curry (Boyd Division)
  - Championship Game: Curry 17, Fitchburg State 14 (2OT)
- New England Small College Athletic Conference – Trinity (CT)
- New Jersey Athletic Conference – Rowan and SUNY Cortland
- North Coast Athletic Conference – Wabash
- Northwest Conference – Linfield
- Ohio Athletic Conference – Mount Union
- Old Dominion Athletic Conference – Bridgewater
- Presidents' Athletic Conference – Thiel
- Southern California Intercollegiate Athletic Conference – Occidental
- Southern Collegiate Athletic Conference – Trinity (TX)
- University Athletic Association – Chicago
- Upper Midwest Athletic Conference – Northwestern–St. Paul
- USA South Athletic Conference – Ferrum and Methodist
- Wisconsin Intercollegiate Athletic Conference – Wisconsin–Whitewater

== Postseason ==
The 2005 NCAA Division III Football Championship playoffs were the 33rd annual single-elimination tournament to determine the national champion of men's NCAA Division III college football. The championship Stagg Bowl game was held at Salem Football Stadium in Salem, Virginia, for the 13th time. The bracket for this field expanded from 28 to 32 teams, where it has remained.

=== Qualification ===
Twenty-one conferences met the requirements for an automatic ("Pool A") bid to the playoffs. Besides the NESCAC, which does not participate in the playoffs, five conferences had no Pool A bid. The PAC was in the first year of the two-year waiting period, while the ACFC, NWC, UAA, and UMAC failed to meet the seven-member requirement.

Schools not in Pool A conferences were eligible for Pool B. The number of Pool B bids was determined by calculating the ratio of Pool A conferences to schools in those conferences and applying that ratio to the number of Pool B schools. The 21 Pool A conferences contained 179 schools, an average of 8.5 teams per conference. Thirty-seven schools were in Pool B, enough for four bids.

The remaining seven playoff spots were at-large ("Pool C") teams.

=== Playoff bracket ===
First Round; Campus Sites
Linfield	63
Occidental	21
Concordia–Moorhead	27
Coe	14
Saint John's (MN)	62
Monmouth (IL)	3
Wisconsin–Whitewater	34
Central (IA)	14
Mary Hardin–Baylor	35
Trinity (TX)	6
Wesley	59
Ferrum	14
Bridgewater (VA)	30
Washington & Jefferson	21
Thiel	28
Johns Hopkins	3
Wabash	38
Albion	20
Capital	21
North Central (IL)	19
Augustana (IL)	49
Lakeland	22
Mount Union	49
Mount St. Joseph	6
Delaware Valley	37
Curry	22
Hobart	23
Cortland	22
Rowan	42
Wilkes	3
Union (NY)	55
Ithaca	41

Second Round; Campus Sites
Linfield	28
Concordia–Moorhead	14
Saint John's (MN)	7
Wisconsin–Whitewater	34
Mary Hardin–Baylor	36
Wesley	46
Bridgewater (VA)	24
Thiel	13
Wabash	11
Capital	14
Augustana (IL)	7
Mount Union	44
Delaware Valley	21
Hobart	14
Rowan	28
Union (NY)	24

Quarterfinals; Campus Sites
Linfield	41
Wisconsin–Whitewater	44
Wesley	46
Bridgewater (VA)	7
Mount Union	34
Capital	31
Delaware Valley	21
Rowan	27

Semifinals; Campus Sites
Wisconsin–Whitewater	58
Wesley	6
Mount Union	19
Rowan	7

National Championship Game; Salem Football Stadium; Salem, Virginia
Wisconsin–Whitewater	28
Mount Union	35

* Overtime

== See also ==
- 2005 NCAA Division I-A football season
- 2005 NCAA Division I-AA football season
- 2005 NCAA Division II football season
