= Mount Ida Mustangs football =

Defunct American football program

- First season: 1999; 27 years ago
- Last season: 2017; 9 years ago
- Location: Newton, Massachusetts
- Stadium: Alumni Field
- All-time record: 76–119 (.390)

Conference championships
- 1

The Mount Ida Mustangs football program represented Mount Ida College in college football. Milton fielded its first football team in 1999 and its last in 2017 before the school closed in 2018. The Mustangs competed at the NCAA Division III level as an independent from 1999 to 2009 and as a member of the Eastern Collegiate Football Conference (ECFC) from 2009 to 2017. The program has three head coaches: John Papas (1999), Ed Sweeney (2000–2007), and Mike Landers (2008–2017). In 19 seasons of play, Mount Ida compiled an all-time record of 76–119. The Mustangs shared the ECFC title in 2012, the same year they made their only postseason appearance, losing in the first round of the NCAA Division III Football Championship playoffs.
