= 2012 NCAA Division III football season =

American college football season

- Regular season: August – November 2012
- Playoffs: November – December 2012
- National championship: Salem Football Stadium; Salem, VA
- Champion: Mount Union (11)
- Gagliardi Trophy: Scottie Williams (RB), Elmhurst (IL)

The 2012 NCAA Division III football season, part of the college football season organized by the NCAA at the Division III level in the United States, began in August 2012, and concluded with the NCAA Division III Football Championship, also known as the Stagg Bowl, in December 2012 at Salem Football Stadium in Salem, Virginia. The Mount Union Purple Raiders won their eleventh Division III championship by defeating the St. Thomas (MN) Tommies, 28−10.

The Gagliardi Trophy, given to the most outstanding player in Division III football, was awarded to Scottie Williams, running back from Elmhurst (IL).

== Conference changes and new programs ==
School	2011 conference	2012 conference
McMurry	ASC (Division III)	Heartland (Division II)

== Conference standings ==
2012 American Southwest Conference football standings
	Conf.			Overall
Team	W		L	W		L
No. 2 Mary Hardin–Baylor $^	7	–	0	13	–	1
No. 23 Louisiana College ^	6	–	1	8	–	3
Hardin–Simmons	5	–	2	6	–	4
Sul Ross	4	–	3	5	–	5
Texas Lutheran	2	–	5	4	–	6
East Texas Baptist	2	–	5	3	–	7
Mississippi College	1	–	6	2	–	8
Howard Payne	1	–	6	1	–	9
$ – Conference champion; ^ – NCAA Division III playoff participant; Rankings from D3football.com

2012 Centennial Conference football standings
	Conf.			Overall
Team	W		L	W		L
No. 22 Johns Hopkins $^	8	–	1	10	–	2
Muhlenberg	7	–	2	8	–	3
Gettysburg	6	–	3	7	–	3
Franklin & Marshall	6	–	3	7	–	4
Susquehanna	5	–	4	6	–	4
Ursinus	5	–	4	6	–	4
Dickinson	4	–	5	4	–	6
Juniata	2	–	7	3	–	7
Moravian	2	–	7	2	–	8
McDaniel	0	–	9	0	–	10
$ – Conference champion; ^ – NCAA Division III playoff participant; Rankings from D3football.com

2012 College Conference of Illinois and Wisconsin football standings
	Conf.			Overall
Team	W		L	W		L
No. 8 Elmhurst +^	6	–	1	10	–	2
No. 21 Wheaton (IL) +	6	–	1	8	–	2
No. 7 North Central (IL) +^	6	–	1	9	–	3
Augustana (IL)	4	–	3	5	–	5
Illinois Wesleyan	3	–	4	6	–	4
Millikin	2	–	5	5	–	5
Carthage	1	–	6	3	–	7
North Park	0	–	7	1	–	9
$ – Conference champion; ^ – NCAA Division III playoff participant; Rankings from D3football.com

2012 Eastern Collegiate Football Conference standings
	Conf.			Overall
Team	W		L	W		L
Mount Ida +^	6	–	1	8	–	3
Castleton +	6	–	1	7	–	4
Gallaudet	5	–	2	7	–	3
Norwich	4	–	2	7	–	3
SUNY Maritime	2	–	4	3	–	6
Becker	2	–	5	3	–	7
Anna Maria	1	–	6	2	–	8
Husson	1	–	6	2	–	8
+ – Conference co-champions; ^ – NCAA Division III playoff participant

2012 Empire 8 Athletic Conference football standings
	Conf.			Overall
Team	W		L	W		L
No. 11 Salisbury $^	6	–	1	9	–	3
Alfred	5	–	2	6	–	4
St. John Fisher	4	–	3	8	–	3
Buffalo State	4	–	3	6	–	4
Ithaca	4	–	3	6	–	4
Utica	4	–	3	6	–	4
Frostburg State	1	–	6	3	–	7
Hartwick	0	–	7	3	–	7
$ – Conference champion; ^ – NCAA Division III playoff participant; Rankings from D3football.com

2012 Heartland Collegiate Athletic Conference football standings
	Conf.			Overall
Team	W		L	W		L
No. 20 Franklin (IN) $^	8	–	0	9	–	3
Hanover	6	–	2	6	–	4
Manchester	6	–	2	6	–	4
Bluffton	5	–	3	6	–	4
Rose–Hulman	5	–	3	5	–	5
Mount St. Joseph	3	–	5	4	–	6
Defiance	2	–	6	2	–	8
Earlham	1	–	7	1	–	9
Anderson (IN)	0	–	8	0	–	10
$ – Conference champion; ^ – NCAA Division III playoff participant; Rankings from D3football.com

2012 Iowa Intercollegiate Athletic Conference football standings
	Conf.			Overall
Team	W		L	W		L
No. 15 Coe $^	7	–	0	10	–	1
Simpson (IA)	4	–	3	6	–	4
Wartburg	4	–	3	6	–	4
Central (IA)	4	–	3	5	–	5
Dubuque	4	–	3	5	–	5
Buena Vista	4	–	3	4	–	6
Loras	1	–	6	2	–	8
Luther	0	–	7	0	–	10
$ – Conference champion; ^ – NCAA Division III playoff participant; Rankings from D3football.com

2012 Liberty League football standings
	Conf.			Overall
Team	W		L	W		L
No. 9 Hobart $^	7	–	0	12	–	1
Union (NY)	6	–	1	6	–	4
Springfield	5	–	2	8	–	3
RPI	3	–	4	5	–	4
Merchant Marine	3	–	4	5	–	5
Rochester (NY)	3	–	4	4	–	5
WPI	1	–	6	2	–	8
St. Lawrence	0	–	7	0	–	10
$ – Conference champion; ^ – NCAA Division III playoff participant; Rankings from D3football.com

2012 Michigan Intercollegiate Athletic Association football standings
	Conf.			Overall
Team	W		L	W		L
Adrian $^	6	–	0	9	–	2
Trine	5	–	1	7	–	3
Hope	4	–	2	5	–	5
Albion	3	–	3	6	–	4
Kalamazoo	2	–	4	5	–	5
Alma	1	–	5	1	–	9
Olivet	0	–	6	0	–	10
$ – Conference champion; ^ – NCAA Division III playoff participant

2012 Middle Atlantic Conference football standings
	Conf.			Overall
Team	W		L	W		L
No. 10 Widener $^	8	–	0	11	–	1
Lycoming	8	–	1	8	–	2
Delaware Valley	7	–	2	8	–	3
Albright	6	–	3	8	–	3
Lebanon Valley	5	–	4	6	–	4
Wilkes	4	–	5	5	–	5
FDU Florham	2	–	6	2	–	8
King's	2	–	7	2	–	8
Stevenson	2	–	7	2	–	8
Misericordia	0	–	9	0	–	10
$ – Conference champion; ^ – NCAA Division III playoff participant; Rankings from D3football.com

2012 Midwest Conference football standings
	Conf.			Overall
Team	W		L	W		L
Lake Forest +	8	–	1	8	–	2
St. Norbert +^	8	–	1	8	–	3
Carroll (WI)	7	–	2	8	–	2
Illinois College	7	–	2	8	–	2
Monmouth (IL)	5	–	4	5	–	5
Ripon	5	–	4	5	–	5
Cornell (IA)	4	–	5	4	–	6
Grinnell	2	–	7	2	–	8
Knox	2	–	7	2	–	8
Lawrence	2	–	8	2	–	8
Beloit	0	–	9	0	–	10
+ – Conference co-champions; ^ – NCAA Division III playoff participant

2012 Minnesota Intercollegiate Athletic Conference football standings
	Conf.			Overall
Team	W		L	W		L
No. 3 St. Thomas (MN) $^	8	–	0	14	–	1
No. 18 Concordia–Moorhead	6	–	2	8	–	2
No. 12 Bethel (MN) ^	6	–	2	9	–	3
Augsburg	5	–	3	7	–	3
St. Olaf	5	–	3	7	–	3
Saint John's (MN)	3	–	5	5	–	5
Gustavus Adolphus	2	–	6	3	–	7
Carleton	1	–	7	3	–	7
Hamline	0	–	8	1	–	9
$ – Conference champion; ^ – NCAA Division III playoff participant; Rankings from D3football.com

2012 New England Football Conference standings
	Conf.			Overall
Team	W		L	W		L
Bogan Division
Framingham State xy$^	7	–	0	10	–	2
Bridgewater State ^	6	–	1	9	–	2
Worcester State	4	–	3	6	–	4
Coast Guard	4	–	3	5	–	4
Massachusetts Maritime	4	–	3	5	–	4
Westfield State	2	–	5	3	–	7
Fitchburg State	1	–	6	2	–	8
Maine Maritime	0	–	7	0	–	9
Boyd Division
Endicott x	6	–	1	9	–	2
Salve Regina xy	6	–	1	9	–	2
Curry	5	–	2	6	–	4
Western New England	4	–	3	6	–	4
MIT	4	–	3	5	–	4
Plymouth State	1	–	6	2	–	8
Nichols	1	–	6	1	–	9
UMass Dartmouth	1	–	6	1	–	9
Championship: Framingham State 28, Salve Regina 16
$ – Conference champion; x – Division champion/co-champions; y – Championship game participant; ^ – NCAA Division III playoff participant

2012 New England Small College Athletic Conference football standings
	Conf.			Overall
Team	W		L	W		L
Trinity (CT) $	8	–	0	8	–	0
Middlebury	7	–	1	7	–	1
Amherst	6	–	2	6	–	2
Bates	5	–	3	5	–	3
Wesleyan	5	–	3	5	–	3
Williams	4	–	4	4	–	4
Colby	3	–	5	3	–	5
Bowdoin	1	–	7	1	–	7
Hamilton	1	–	7	1	–	7
Tufts	0	–	8	0	–	8
$ – Conference champion

2012 New Jersey Athletic Conference football standings
	Conf.			Overall
Team	W		L	W		L
No. 24 Cortland $^	7	–	0	9	–	2
No. 25 Rowan ^	6	–	1	7	–	3
Kean	5	–	2	5	–	4
Montclair State	5	–	3	5	–	5
Brockport	4	–	4	6	–	4
TCNJ	3	–	5	4	–	6
William Paterson	2	–	5	5	–	5
Western Connecticut	1	–	7	1	–	8
Morrisville State	1	–	7	1	–	9
$ – Conference champion; ^ – NCAA Division III playoff participant; Rankings from D3football.com

2012 North Coast Athletic Conference football standings
	Conf.			Overall
Team	W		L	W		L
Ohio Wesleyan +	6	–	1	9	–	1
No. 14 Wittenberg +^	6	–	1	10	–	2
Wabash	5	–	2	8	–	2
Kenyon	5	–	2	6	–	4
Allegheny	4	–	3	5	–	5
Denison	4	–	3	4	–	6
Oberlin	3	–	4	4	–	6
DePauw	1	–	6	2	–	8
Wooster	1	–	6	2	–	8
Hiram	0	–	7	0	–	10
+ – Conference co-champions; ^ – NCAA Division III playoff participant; Rankings from D3football.com

2012 Northern Athletics Conference football standings
	Conf.			Overall
Team	W		L	W		L
Concordia (IL) $^	7	–	0	10	–	1
Concordia (WI)	6	–	1	7	–	3
Wisconsin Lutheran	5	–	2	7	–	3
Aurora	4	–	3	5	–	5
Benedictine (IL)	3	–	4	5	–	5
Lakeland	2	–	5	2	–	8
Rockford	1	–	6	2	–	8
Maranatha Baptist	0	–	7	0	–	10
$ – Conference champion; ^ – NCAA Division III playoff participant

2012 Northwest Conference football standings
	Conf.			Overall
Team	W		L	W		L
No. 5 Linfield $^	6	–	0	11	–	1
No. 17 Pacific Lutheran ^	5	–	1	7	–	3
Willamette	4	–	2	8	–	2
Whitworth	3	–	3	7	–	3
Pacific (OR)	2	–	4	3	–	6
Lewis & Clark	1	–	5	4	–	5
Puget Sound	0	–	6	0	–	9
$ – Conference champion; ^ – NCAA Division III playoff participant; Rankings from D3football.com

2012 Ohio Athletic Conference football standings
	Conf.			Overall
Team	W		L	W		L
No. 1 Mount Union $^	9	–	0	15	–	0
No. 19 Heidelberg ^	8	–	1	9	–	2
Otterbein	7	–	2	8	–	2
Baldwin Wallace	6	–	3	7	–	3
John Carroll	5	–	4	6	–	4
Ohio Northern	4	–	5	4	–	6
Muskingum	3	–	6	3	–	7
Capital	2	–	7	2	–	8
Wilmington (OH)	1	–	8	1	–	9
Marietta	0	–	9	0	–	10
$ – Conference champion; ^ – NCAA Division III playoff participant; Rankings from D3football.com

2012 Old Dominion Athletic Conference football standings
	Conf.			Overall
Team	W		L	W		L
Washington and Lee $^	6	–	1	8	–	3
Randolph–Macon	5	–	2	7	–	3
Bridgewater	4	–	3	7	–	3
Hampden–Sydney	4	–	3	6	–	4
Guilford	4	–	3	5	–	5
Emory & Henry	3	–	4	6	–	4
Catholic University	2	–	5	3	–	7
Shenandoah	0	–	7	1	–	9
$ – Conference champion; ^ – NCAA Division III playoff participant

2012 Presidents' Athletic Conference football standings
	Conf.			Overall
Team	W		L	W		L
Waynesburg +	7	–	1	10	–	1
Washington & Jefferson +^	7	–	1	8	–	3
Thomas More	6	–	2	7	–	3
Grove City	5	–	3	6	–	4
Bethany (WV)	3	–	5	3	–	7
Geneva	3	–	5	3	–	7
Thiel	3	–	5	3	–	7
Westminster (PA)	2	–	6	3	–	6
Saint Vincent	0	–	8	0	–	10
+ – Conference co-champions; ^ – NCAA Division III playoff participant

2012 Southern Athletic Association football standings
	Conf.			Overall
Team	W		L	W		L
Birmingham–Southern +	3	–	1	7	–	3
Millsaps +	3	–	1	7	–	3
Rhodes	2	–	2	6	–	3
Centre	1	–	3	6	–	4
Sewanee	1	–	3	3	–	7
+ – Conference co-champions

2012 Southern California Intercollegiate Athletic Conference football standings
	Conf.			Overall
Team	W		L	W		L
No. 16 Cal Lutheran $^	7	–	0	8	–	2
Redlands	6	–	1	6	–	3
Chapman	5	–	2	6	–	3
La Verne	4	–	3	4	–	5
Whittier	3	–	4	4	–	5
Occidental	2	–	5	2	–	7
Pomona–Pitzer	1	–	6	1	–	8
Claremont–Mudd–Scripps	0	–	7	0	–	9
$ – Conference champion; ^ – NCAA Division III playoff participant; Rankings from D3football.com

2012 University Athletic Association football standings
	Conf.			Overall
Team	W		L	W		L
Washington University $	3	–	0	5	–	5
Case Western Reserve	2	–	1	6	–	4
Carnegie Mellon	1	–	2	6	–	5
Chicago	0	–	3	4	–	6
$ – Conference champion

2012 Upper Midwest Athletic Conference football standings
	Conf.			Overall
Team	W		L	W		L
Greenville +	7	–	1	8	–	2
Northwestern (MN) +	7	–	1	8	–	3
St. Scholastica +^	7	–	1	8	–	3
Minnesota–Morris	5	–	3	6	–	4
Eureka	3	–	5	4	–	6
Martin Luther	2	–	6	4	–	6
Westminster (MO)	2	–	6	4	–	6
MacMurray	2	–	6	2	–	8
Crown	1	–	7	2	–	8
+ – Conference co-champions; ^ – NCAA Division III playoff participant

2012 USA South Athletic Conference football standings
	Conf.			Overall
Team	W		L	W		L
Ferrum +	5	–	2	7	–	3
Maryville (TN) +	5	–	2	6	–	4
Christopher Newport +^	5	–	2	6	–	5
Methodist	4	–	3	5	–	5
Greensboro	3	–	4	5	–	5
LaGrange	3	–	4	3	–	7
North Carolina Wesleyan	2	–	5	3	–	7
Averett	1	–	6	1	–	9
+ – Conference co-champions; ^ – NCAA Division III playoff participant

2012 Wisconsin Intercollegiate Athletic Conference football standings
	Conf.			Overall
Team	W		L	W		L
No. 4 Wisconsin–Oshkosh $^	7	–	0	13	–	1
No. 13 Wisconsin–Platteville	5	–	2	8	–	2
Wisconsin–Whitewater	5	–	2	7	–	3
Wisconsin–Eau Claire	4	–	3	4	–	6
Wisconsin–La Crosse	3	–	4	4	–	6
Wisconsin–River Falls	2	–	5	2	–	8
Wisconsin–Stout	1	–	6	3	–	7
Wisconsin–Stevens Point	1	–	6	2	–	8
$ – Conference champion; ^ – NCAA Division III playoff participant; Rankings from D3football.com

2012 NCAA Division III independents football records
	Conf.			Overall
Team	W		L	W		L
No. 6 Wesley ^		–		10	–	2
Trinity (TX)		–		7	–	3
Huntingdon		–		6	–	3
Macalester		–		6	–	4
Austin		–		2	–	8
Presentation		–		2	–	8
^ – NCAA Division III playoff participant; Rankings from D3football.com

== Conference champions ==
Conference champions
- American Southwest Conference – Mary Hardin–Baylor
- Centennial Conference – Johns Hopkins
- College Conference of Illinois and Wisconsin – Elmhurst, North Central (IL), and Wheaton (IL)
- Eastern Collegiate Football Conference – Castleton State and Mount Ida
- Empire 8 Conference – Salisbury
- Heartland Collegiate Athletic Conference – Franklin
- Iowa Intercollegiate Athletic Conference – Coe
- Liberty League – Hobart
- Michigan Intercollegiate Athletic Association – Adrian
- Middle Atlantic Conference – Widener
- Midwest Conference – Lake Forest and St. Norbert
- Minnesota Intercollegiate Athletic Conference – St. Thomas (MN)
- New England Football Conference – Framingham State (Bogan Division), Endicott and Salve Regina (Boyd Division)
  - Championship Game: Framingham State 28, Salve Regina 16
- New England Small College Athletic Conference – Trinity (CT)
- New Jersey Athletic Conference – SUNY Cortland
- North Coast Athletic Conference – Ohio Wesleyan and Wittenberg
- Northern Athletics Collegiate Conference – Concordia Chicago
- Northwest Conference – Linfield
- Ohio Athletic Conference – Mount Union
- Old Dominion Athletic Conference – Washington & Lee
- Presidents' Athletic Conference – Washington & Jefferson and Waynesburg
- Southern California Intercollegiate Athletic Conference – Cal Lutheran
- Southern Collegiate Athletic Conference – Trinity (TX)
- University Athletic Association – Washington–Saint Louis
- Upper Midwest Athletic Conference – Greenville, Northwestern–St. Paul, and St. Scholastica
- USA South Athletic Conference – Christopher Newport, Ferrum, and Maryville (TN)
- Wisconsin Intercollegiate Athletic Conference – Wisconsin–Oshkosh

== Postseason ==
The 2012 NCAA Division III Football Championship playoffs were the 40th annual single-elimination tournament to determine the national champion of men's NCAA Division III college football. The championship Stagg Bowl game was held at Salem Football Stadium in Salem, Virginia for the 20th time.

=== Qualification ===
Twenty-four conferences met the requirements for an automatic ("Pool A") bid to the playoffs. Besides the NESCAC, which does not participate in the playoffs, two conferences (the SAA and UAA) had no Pool A bid, neither meeting the seven-member requirement.

Schools not in Pool A conferences were eligible for Pool B. The number of Pool B bids was determined by calculating the ratio of Pool A conferences to schools in those conferences and applying that ratio to the number of Pool B schools. The 24 Pool A conferences contained 214 schools, an average of 8.9 teams per conference. Fifteen schools were in Pool B, enough for one bid.

The remaining seven playoff spots were at-large ("Pool C") teams.

=== Playoff bracket ===
First Round; Campus Sites
Linfield	27
Pacific Lutheran	24
North Central (IL)	41
Cal Lutheran	21
Bethel (MN)	24
Concordia Chicago	23
Wisconsin–Oshkosh	55
St. Scholastica	10
Hobart	38
Washington & Lee	20
Wittenberg	52
Heidelberg	38
Elmhurst	27
Coe	24
St. Thomas (MN)	48
St. Norbert	17
Mary Hardin–Baylor	59
Louisiana College	20
Franklin	42
Adrian	10
SUNY Cortland	20
Framingham State	19
Wesley	73
Mount Ida	14
Widener	44
Bridgewater State	14
Salisbury	17
Rowan	9
Johns Hopkins	42
Washington & Jefferson	10
Mount Union	72
Christopher Newport	14

Second Round; Campus Sites
Linfield	30
North Central (IL)	14
Bethel (MN)	14
Wisconsin–Oshkosh	37
Hobart	35
Wittenberg	10
Elmhurst	17
St. Thomas (MN)	24
Mary Hardin–Baylor	63
Franklin	17
SUNY Cortland	6
Wesley	56
Widener	28
Salisbury	7
Johns Hopkins	13
Mount Union	55

Quarterfinals; Campus Sites
Linfield	24
Wisconsin–Oshkosh	31*
Hobart	7
St. Thomas (MN)	47
Mary Hardin–Baylor	32
Wesley	20
Widener	17
Mount Union	72

Semifinals; Campus Sites
Wisconsin–Oshkosh	14
St. Thomas (MN)	28
Mary Hardin–Baylor	35
Mount Union	48

National Championship Game; Salem Football Stadium; Salem, Virginia
St. Thomas (MN)	10
Mount Union	28

* Overtime

== See also ==
- 2012 NCAA Division I FBS football season
- 2012 NCAA Division I FCS football season
- 2012 NCAA Division II football season
