= 2011 NCAA Division III football season =

American college football season

- Regular season: August – November 2011
- Playoffs: November – December 2011
- National championship: Salem Football Stadium; Salem, VA
- Champion: Wisconsin–Whitewater (4)
- Gagliardi Trophy: Michael Zweifel (WR), Dubuque

The 2011 NCAA Division III football season, part of the college football season organized by the NCAA at the Division III level in the United States, began in August 2011, and concluded with the NCAA Division III Football Championship, also known as the Stagg Bowl, in December 2011 at Salem Football Stadium in Salem, Virginia. The Wisconsin–Whitewater Warhawks won their fourth, and third consecutive, Division III championship by defeating the Mount Union Purple Raiders, 13−10. This was the seventh of seven straight championship games between Mount Union (3 wins) and Wisconsin–Whitewater (4 wins).

The Gagliardi Trophy, given to the most outstanding player in Division III football, was awarded to Michael Zweifel, wide receiver from Dubuque.

== Conference standings ==
2011 American Southwest Conference football standings
	Conf.			Overall
Team	W		L	W		L
No. 5 Mary Hardin–Baylor $^	8	–	0	12	–	1
No. 14 McMurry ^	7	–	1	9	–	3
Louisiana College	5	–	3	7	–	3
Hardin–Simmons	4	–	4	6	–	4
East Texas Baptist	4	–	4	5	–	5
Texas Lutheran	4	–	4	5	–	5
Mississippi College	2	–	6	3	–	7
Sul Ross	1	–	7	2	–	8
Howard Payne	1	–	7	1	–	9
$ – Conference champion; ^ – NCAA Division III playoff participant; Rankings from D3football.com

2011 Centennial Conference football standings
	Conf.			Overall
Team	W		L	W		L
No. 18 Johns Hopkins $^	9	–	0	10	–	1
Muhlenberg	7	–	2	7	–	3
Gettysburg	6	–	3	6	–	4
Ursinus	6	–	3	6	–	4
Susquehanna	5	–	4	6	–	4
Dickinson	4	–	5	4	–	6
Franklin & Marshall	3	–	6	3	–	7
McDaniel	2	–	7	2	–	8
Moravian	2	–	7	2	–	8
Juniata	1	–	8	1	–	9
$ – Conference champion; ^ – NCAA Division III playoff participant; Rankings from D3football.com

2011 College Conference of Illinois and Wisconsin football standings
	Conf.			Overall
Team	W		L	W		L
No. 8 North Central (IL) $^	7	–	0	10	–	2
No. 21 Illinois Wesleyan ^	6	–	1	9	–	2
No. 22 Wheaton (IL)	5	–	2	8	–	2
Elmhurst	4	–	3	6	–	4
Carthage	2	–	5	5	–	5
Millikin	2	–	5	4	–	6
Augustana (IL)	2	–	5	2	–	8
North Park	0	–	7	3	–	7
$ – Conference champion; ^ – NCAA Division III playoff participant; Rankings from D3football.com

2011 Eastern Collegiate Football Conference standings
	Conf.			Overall
Team	W		L	W		L
Norwich $^	7	–	0	7	–	4
SUNY Maritime	6	–	1	8	–	2
Mount Ida	5	–	2	6	–	5
Gallaudet	4	–	3	5	–	5
Castleton	3	–	4	4	–	6
Anna Maria	2	–	5	2	–	8
Becker	1	–	6	1	–	9
Husson	0	–	7	0	–	10
$ – Conference champion; ^ – NCAA Division III playoff participant

2011 Empire 8 Athletic Conference football standings
	Conf.			Overall
Team	W		L	W		L
No. 9 Salisbury $^	7	–	0	11	–	2
No. 11 St. John Fisher ^	6	–	1	10	–	3
Alfred	4	–	3	8	–	3
Springfield	4	–	3	6	–	4
Frostburg State	3	–	4	4	–	6
Utica	2	–	5	5	–	5
Ithaca	2	–	5	4	–	6
Hartwick	0	–	7	2	–	8
$ – Conference champion; ^ – NCAA Division III playoff participant; Rankings from D3football.com

2011 Heartland Collegiate Athletic Conference football standings
	Conf.			Overall
Team	W		L	W		L
No. 15 Franklin (IN) $^	8	–	0	10	–	2
Mount St. Joseph	5	–	3	6	–	4
Bluffton	5	–	3	5	–	5
Hanover	5	–	3	5	–	5
Rose–Hulman	5	–	3	5	–	5
Defiance	4	–	4	4	–	6
Manchester	3	–	5	4	–	6
Anderson (IN)	1	–	7	1	–	9
Earlham	0	–	8	0	–	10
$ – Conference champion; ^ – NCAA Division III playoff participant; Rankings from D3football.com

2011 Iowa Intercollegiate Athletic Conference football standings
	Conf.			Overall
Team	W		L	W		L
Dubuque $^	7	–	1	9	–	2
Wartburg	6	–	2	8	–	2
Central (IA)	6	–	2	7	–	3
Coe	6	–	2	6	–	4
Simpson (IA)	5	–	3	5	–	5
Luther	3	–	5	3	–	7
Buena Vista	2	–	6	2	–	8
Cornell (IA)	1	–	7	3	–	7
Loras	0	–	8	1	–	9
$ – Conference champion; ^ – NCAA Division III playoff participant

2011 Liberty League football standings
	Conf.			Overall
Team	W		L	W		L
Hobart +^	5	–	1	7	–	2
Union (NY) +	5	–	1	6	–	4
Rochester (NY)	3	–	3	4	–	5
RPI	3	–	3	4	–	5
St. Lawrence	2	–	4	3	–	6
Merchant Marine	2	–	4	3	–	7
WPI	1	–	5	2	–	7
+ – Conference co-champions; ^ – NCAA Division III playoff participant

2011 Michigan Intercollegiate Athletic Association football standings
	Conf.			Overall
Team	W		L	W		L
Albion $^	6	–	0	6	–	5
Hope	5	–	1	7	–	3
Adrian	4	–	2	8	–	2
Trine	3	–	3	7	–	3
Kalamazoo	1	–	5	4	–	6
Alma	1	–	5	2	–	8
Olivet	1	–	5	1	–	9
$ – Conference champion; ^ – NCAA Division III playoff participant

2011 Middle Atlantic Conference football standings
	Conf.			Overall
Team	W		L	W		L
No. 13 Delaware Valley $^	8	–	0	11	–	1
Widener	6	–	2	9	–	2
Lycoming	6	–	2	8	–	2
Lebanon Valley	5	–	3	8	–	3
Albright	4	–	4	6	–	5
Wilkes	4	–	4	4	–	5
Stevenson	1	–	7	2	–	8
FDU Florham	1	–	7	1	–	9
King's	1	–	7	1	–	9
$ – Conference champion; ^ – NCAA Division III playoff participant; Rankings from D3football.com

2011 Midwest Conference football standings
	Conf.			Overall
Team	W		L	W		L
No. 19 Monmouth (IL) $^	9	–	0	10	–	2
Illinois College ^	8	–	1	9	–	2
St. Norbert	7	–	2	7	–	3
Carroll (WI)	6	–	3	7	–	3
Ripon	5	–	4	6	–	4
Grinnell	4	–	5	5	–	5
Lake Forest	3	–	6	3	–	7
Beloit	2	–	7	2	–	8
Lawrence	1	–	8	1	–	9
Knox	0	–	9	0	–	10
$ – Conference champion; ^ – NCAA Division III playoff participant; Rankings from D3football.com

2011 Minnesota Intercollegiate Athletic Conference football standings
	Conf.			Overall
Team	W		L	W		L
No. 4 St. Thomas (MN) $^	8	–	0	13	–	1
No. 25 Bethel (MN)	6	–	2	8	–	2
St. Olaf	6	–	2	8	–	2
Saint John's (MN)	5	–	3	6	–	4
Augsburg	4	–	4	6	–	4
Concordia–Moorhead	4	–	4	6	–	4
Gustavus Adolphus	2	–	6	2	–	8
Carleton	1	–	7	2	–	8
Hamline	0	–	8	0	–	10
$ – Conference champion; ^ – NCAA Division III playoff participant; Rankings from D3football.com

2011 New England Football Conference standings
	Conf.			Overall
Team	W		L	W		L
Bogan Division
Framingham State xy	6	–	1	7	–	4
Worcester State	5	–	2	8	–	3
Bridgewater State	5	–	2	7	–	3
Westfield State	4	–	3	5	–	5
Massachusetts Maritime	3	–	4	5	–	4
Maine Maritime	2	–	5	4	–	5
Coast Guard	2	–	5	2	–	7
Fitchburg State	1	–	6	2	–	8
Boyd Division
Western New England xy$^	7	–	0	10	–	2
Endicott	6	–	1	10	–	1
Salve Regina	5	–	2	8	–	3
UMass Dartmouth	4	–	3	5	–	5
Curry	3	–	4	5	–	5
Plymouth State	2	–	5	4	–	6
MIT	1	–	6	2	–	7
Nichols	0	–	7	0	–	10
Championship: Western New England 20, Framingham State 13
$ – Conference champion; x – Division champion/co-champions; y – Championship game participant; ^ – NCAA Division III playoff participant

2011 New England Small College Athletic Conference football standings
	Conf.			Overall
Team	W		L	W		L
Amherst $	8	–	0	8	–	0
Trinity (CT)	7	–	1	7	–	1
Williams	5	–	3	5	–	3
Bowdoin	4	–	4	4	–	4
Middlebury	4	–	4	4	–	4
Bates	3	–	5	3	–	5
Colby	3	–	5	3	–	5
Hamilton	3	–	5	3	–	5
Wesleyan	3	–	5	3	–	5
Tufts	0	–	8	0	–	8
$ – Conference champion

2011 New Jersey Athletic Conference football standings
	Conf.			Overall
Team	W		L	W		L
No. 10 Kean $^	8	–	1	10	–	2
Cortland	7	–	2	9	–	2
Montclair State	7	–	2	8	–	2
TCNJ	6	–	3	7	–	3
Buffalo State	5	–	4	5	–	5
Rowan	5	–	4	5	–	5
William Paterson	3	–	6	4	–	6
Brockport	3	–	6	3	–	7
Morrisville State	1	–	8	1	–	9
Western Connecticut	0	–	9	0	–	10
$ – Conference champion; ^ – NCAA Division III playoff participant; Rankings from D3football.com

2011 North Coast Athletic Conference football standings
	Conf.			Overall
Team	W		L	W		L
No. 7 Wabash $^	6	–	0	12	–	1
Wittenberg	5	–	1	8	–	2
Denison	4	–	2	5	–	5
Allegheny	3	–	3	5	–	5
Ohio Wesleyan	3	–	3	4	–	6
Wooster	3	–	3	4	–	6
Oberlin	2	–	4	3	–	7
Hiram	1	–	5	1	–	9
Kenyon	0	–	6	0	–	10
$ – Conference champion; ^ – NCAA Division III playoff participant; Rankings from D3football.com

2011 Northern Athletics Conference football standings
	Conf.			Overall
Team	W		L	W		L
Concordia (IL) +	6	–	1	8	–	2
Benedictine (IL) +^	6	–	1	7	–	4
Wisconsin Lutheran	5	–	2	6	–	4
Concordia (WI)	4	–	3	4	–	6
Lakeland	4	–	3	4	–	6
Aurora	2	–	5	3	–	7
Maranatha Baptist	1	–	6	3	–	7
Rockford	0	–	7	0	–	10
+ – Conference co-champions; ^ – NCAA Division III playoff participant

2011 Northwest Conference football standings
	Conf.			Overall
Team	W		L	W		L
No. 6 Linfield $^	6	–	0	10	–	1
Lewis & Clark	4	–	2	7	–	2
Pacific Lutheran	4	–	2	6	–	3
Whitworth	3	–	3	4	–	6
Willamette	3	–	3	4	–	6
Pacific (OR)	1	–	5	1	–	8
Puget Sound	0	–	6	0	–	9
$ – Conference champion; ^ – NCAA Division III playoff participant; Rankings from D3football.com

2011 Ohio Athletic Conference football standings
	Conf.			Overall
Team	W		L	W		L
No. 2 Mount Union $^	9	–	0	14	–	1
No. 24 Baldwin–Wallace	7	–	2	8	–	2
Heidelberg	7	–	2	8	–	2
Ohio Northern	5	–	4	6	–	4
Capital	5	–	4	5	–	5
John Carroll	5	–	4	5	–	5
Muskingum	3	–	6	4	–	6
Marietta	2	–	7	3	–	7
Otterbein	2	–	7	3	–	7
Wilmington (OH)	0	–	9	0	–	10
$ – Conference champion; ^ – NCAA Division III playoff participant; Rankings from D3football.com

2011 Old Dominion Athletic Conference football standings
	Conf.			Overall
Team	W		L	W		L
Washington and Lee +	5	–	1	8	–	2
Hampden–Sydney +^	5	–	1	8	–	3
Randolph–Macon	4	–	2	8	–	2
Bridgewater	3	–	3	6	–	4
Emory & Henry	2	–	4	5	–	5
Catholic University	1	–	5	5	–	5
Guilford	1	–	5	2	–	8
+ – Conference co-champions; ^ – NCAA Division III playoff participant

2011 Presidents' Athletic Conference football standings
	Conf.			Overall
Team	W		L	W		L
No. 23 Thomas More $^	7	–	1	9	–	2
Washington & Jefferson	5	–	3	6	–	4
Saint Vincent	5	–	3	6	–	5
Waynesburg	5	–	3	5	–	5
Westminster (PA)	4	–	4	5	–	5
Geneva	4	–	4	4	–	6
Bethany (WV)	3	–	5	5	–	5
Grove City	3	–	5	3	–	7
Thiel	0	–	8	0	–	10
$ – Conference champion; ^ – NCAA Division III playoff participant; Rankings from D3football.com

2011 Southern California Intercollegiate Athletic Conference football standings
	Conf.			Overall
Team	W		L	W		L
No. 12 Cal Lutheran $^	6	–	0	8	–	2
No. 20 Redlands ^	5	–	1	8	–	2
Occidental	3	–	3	5	–	4
Claremont–Mudd–Scripps	3	–	3	4	–	5
La Verne	3	–	3	4	–	5
Whittier	1	–	5	2	–	7
Pomona–Pitzer	0	–	6	0	–	9
Chapman *		–		4	–	5
$ – Conference champion; ^ – NCAA Division III playoff participant; ^{*} – Chapman played a full conference schedule, but games against them were not counted in the standings.; Rankings from D3football.com

2011 Southern Collegiate Athletic Conference football standings
	Conf.			Overall
Team	W		L	W		L
No. 17 Trinity (TX) $^	6	–	0	10	–	1
No. 16 Centre ^	5	–	1	9	–	2
Birmingham–Southern	4	–	2	7	–	2
Millsaps	3	–	3	4	–	6
Sewanee	2	–	4	5	–	5
Rhodes	1	–	5	3	–	6
Austin	0	–	6	0	–	10
$ – Conference champion; ^ – NCAA Division III playoff participant; Rankings from D3football.com

2011 University Athletic Association football standings
	Conf.			Overall
Team	W		L	W		L
Case Western Reserve $	3	–	0	9	–	1
Washington University	2	–	1	6	–	4
Carnegie Mellon	1	–	2	5	–	5
Chicago	0	–	3	5	–	5
$ – Conference champion

2011 Upper Midwest Athletic Conference football standings
	Conf.			Overall
Team	W		L	W		L
St. Scholastica $^	9	–	0	10	–	1
Westminster (MO)	7	–	2	8	–	2
Greenville	7	–	2	7	–	4
Northwestern (MN)	6	–	3	6	–	4
Minnesota–Morris	5	–	4	5	–	5
Eureka	4	–	5	4	–	6
Presentation	3	–	6	3	–	7
MacMurray	2	–	7	2	–	8
Martin Luther	2	–	7	2	–	8
Crown	0	–	9	0	–	10
$ – Conference champion; ^ – NCAA Division III playoff participant

2011 USA South Athletic Conference football standings
	Conf.			Overall
Team	W		L	W		L
Christopher Newport $^	7	–	0	8	–	3
Ferrum	6	–	1	7	–	3
Shenandoah	5	–	2	6	–	4
Maryville (TN)	4	–	3	4	–	6
Averett	2	–	5	3	–	7
Methodist	2	–	5	3	–	7
North Carolina Wesleyan	2	–	5	2	–	8
Greensboro	0	–	7	0	–	10
$ – Conference champion; ^ – NCAA Division III playoff participant

2011 Wisconsin Intercollegiate Athletic Conference football standings
	Conf.			Overall
Team	W		L	W		L
No. 1 Wisconsin–Whitewater $^	7	–	0	15	–	0
Wisconsin–Oshkosh	5	–	2	7	–	3
Wisconsin–Platteville	5	–	2	7	–	3
Wisconsin–Eau Claire	3	–	4	5	–	5
Wisconsin–Stout	3	–	4	5	–	5
Wisconsin–Stevens Point	2	–	5	4	–	6
Wisconsin–La Crosse	2	–	5	3	–	7
Wisconsin–River Falls	1	–	6	1	–	9
$ – Conference champion; ^ – NCAA Division III playoff participant; Rankings from D3football.com

2011 NCAA Division III independents football records
	Conf.			Overall
Team	W		L	W		L
No. 3 Wesley ^		–		12	–	2
Huntingdon		–		7	–	3
DePauw		–		4	–	5
Macalester		–		4	–	5
LaGrange		–		4	–	6
^ – NCAA Division III playoff participant; Rankings from D3football.com

== Conference champions ==
Conference champions
- American Southwest Conference – Mary Hardin–Baylor
- Centennial Conference – Johns Hopkins
- College Conference of Illinois and Wisconsin – North Central (IL)
- Eastern Collegiate Football Conference – Norwich
- Empire 8 Conference – Salisbury
- Heartland Collegiate Athletic Conference – Franklin
- Iowa Intercollegiate Athletic Conference – Dubuque
- Liberty League – Hobart and Union (NY)
- Michigan Intercollegiate Athletic Association – Albion
- Middle Atlantic Conference – Delaware Valley
- Midwest Conference – Monmouth (IL)
- Minnesota Intercollegiate Athletic Conference – St. Thomas (MN)
- New England Football Conference – Framingham State (Bogan Division), Western New England (Boyd Division)
  - Championship Game: Western New England 20, Framingham State 13 (OT)
- New England Small College Athletic Conference – Amherst
- New Jersey Athletic Conference – Kean
- North Coast Athletic Conference – Wabash
- Northern Athletics Collegiate Conference – Benedictine (IL) and Concordia Chicago
- Northwest Conference – Linfield
- Ohio Athletic Conference – Mount Union
- Old Dominion Athletic Conference – Hampden–Sydney and Washington & Lee
- Presidents' Athletic Conference – Thomas More
- Southern California Intercollegiate Athletic Conference – Cal Lutheran
- Southern Collegiate Athletic Conference – Trinity (TX)
- University Athletic Association – Case
- Upper Midwest Athletic Conference – St. Scholastica
- USA South Athletic Conference – Christopher Newport
- Wisconsin Intercollegiate Athletic Conference – Wisconsin–Whitewater

== Postseason ==
The 2011 NCAA Division III Football Championship playoffs were the 39th annual single-elimination tournament to determine the national champion of men's NCAA Division III college football. The championship Stagg Bowl game was held at Salem Football Stadium in Salem, Virginia for the 19th time.

=== Qualification ===
Twenty-five conferences met the requirements for an automatic ("Pool A") bid to the playoffs. Besides the NESCAC, which does not participate in the playoffs, the UAA had no Pool A bid, failing to meet the seven-member requirement. The ECFC and UMAC received Pool A bids for the first time, having passed through the two-year waiting period.

Schools not in Pool A conferences were eligible for Pool B. The number of Pool B bids was determined by calculating the ratio of Pool A conferences to schools in those conferences and applying that ratio to the number of Pool B schools. The 25 Pool A conferences contained 220 schools, an average of 8.8 teams per conference. Nine schools were in Pool B, enough for one bid.

The remaining six playoff spots were at-large ("Pool C") teams.

=== Playoff bracket ===
First Round; Campus Sites
Wisconsin–Whitewater	59
Albion	0
Franklin	24
Thomas More	21
Kean	34
Christopher Newport	10
Salisbury	62
Western New England	24
St. Thomas (MN)	48
St. Scholastica	2
Monmouth (IL)	33
Illinois Wesleyan	24
St. John Fisher	23
Johns Hopkins	12
Delaware Valley	62
Norwich	10
Mary Hardin–Baylor	34
Redlands	13
McMurry	25
Trinity (TX)	16
Linfield	30
Cal Lutheran	27
Wesley	35
Hobart	28
Wabash	38
Illinois College	20
North Central (IL)	59
Dubuque	13
Centre	51
Hampden–Sydney	41
Mount Union	47
Benedictine (IL)	7

Second Round; Campus Sites
Wisconsin–Whitewater	41
Franklin	14
Kean	47
Salisbury	49
St. Thomas (MN)	38
Monmouth (IL)	10
St. John Fisher	27
Delaware Valley	14
Mary Hardin–Baylor	49
McMurry	20
Linfield	34
Wesley	49
Wabash	29
North Central (IL)	28
Centre	10
Mount Union	30

Quarterfinals; Campus Sites
Wisconsin–Whitewater	34
Salisbury	14
St. Thomas (MN)	45
St. John Fisher	10
Mary Hardin–Baylor	24
Wesley	27
Wabash	8
Mount Union	20

Semifinals; Campus Sites
Wisconsin–Whitewater	20
St. Thomas (MN)	0
Wesley	21
Mount Union	28

National Championship Game; Salem Football Stadium; Salem, Virginia
Wisconsin–Whitewater	13
Mount Union	10

* Overtime

== See also ==
- 2011 NCAA Division I FBS football season
- 2011 NCAA Division I FCS football season
- 2011 NCAA Division II football season
