= 2008 NCAA Division III football season =

American college football season

- Regular season: August – November 2008
- Playoffs: November – December 2008
- National championship: Salem Football Stadium; Salem, VA
- Champion: Mount Union (10)
- Gagliardi Trophy: Greg Micheli (QB), Mount Union

The 2008 NCAA Division III football season, part of the college football season organized by the NCAA at the Division III level in the United States, began in August 2008, and concluded with the NCAA Division III Football Championship, also known as the Stagg Bowl, in December 2008 at Salem Football Stadium in Salem, Virginia. The Mount Union Purple Raiders won their tenth Division III championship by defeating the Wisconsin–Whitewater Warhawks, 31−26. This was the fourth of seven straight championship games between Mount Union (3 wins) and Wisconsin–Whitewater (4 wins).

The Gagliardi Trophy, given to the most outstanding player in Division III football, was awarded to Greg Micheli, quarterback from Mount Union.

== Program changes ==
- After Tri-State University changed its name to Trine University in 2008, the Tri-State Thunder became the Trine Thunder at the start of the 2008 season.

== Conference standings ==
2008 American Southwest Conference football standings
	Conf.			Overall
Team	W		L	W		L
No. 3 Mary Hardin–Baylor $^	8	–	0	12	–	2
No. 7 Hardin–Simmons ^	7	–	1	9	–	2
Louisiana College	5	–	3	7	–	3
East Texas Baptist	5	–	3	5	–	5
Mississippi College	5	–	3	5	–	5
Texas Lutheran	3	–	5	4	–	6
Sul Ross	2	–	6	3	–	7
Howard Payne	1	–	7	2	–	8
McMurry	0	–	8	0	–	10
$ – Conference champion; ^ – NCAA Division III playoff participant; Rankings from D3football.com

2008 Atlantic Central Football Conference standings
	Conf.			Overall
Team	W		L	W		L
No. 13 Wesley $^	3	–	0	9	–	2
No. 24 Salisbury	2	–	1	9	–	2
Frostburg State	1	–	2	3	–	6
Apprentice §	0	–	3	2	–	7
$ – Conference champion; ^ – NCAA Division III playoff participant; § – Not an NCAA member; Rankings from D3football.com

2008 Centennial Conference football standings
	Conf.			Overall
Team	W		L	W		L
No. 25 Muhlenberg $^	7	–	1	9	–	2
Johns Hopkins	6	–	2	8	–	3
Moravian	6	–	2	8	–	3
Dickinson	5	–	3	6	–	4
Gettysburg	5	–	3	5	–	5
Franklin & Marshall	3	–	5	4	–	6
Ursinus	2	–	6	3	–	7
McDaniel	1	–	7	2	–	8
Juniata	1	–	7	1	–	9
$ – Conference champion; ^ – NCAA Division III playoff participant; Rankings from D3football.com

2008 College Conference of Illinois and Wisconsin football standings
	Conf.			Overall
Team	W		L	W		L
No. 5 North Central (IL) $^	7	–	0	11	–	1
No. 9 Wheaton (IL) ^	5	–	2	11	–	3
Augustana (IL)	5	–	2	7	–	3
Elmhurst	4	–	3	7	–	3
Illinois Wesleyan	3	–	4	6	–	4
Carthage	3	–	4	5	–	5
Millikin	1	–	6	3	–	7
North Park	0	–	7	1	–	9
$ – Conference champion; ^ – NCAA Division III playoff participant; Rankings from D3football.com

2008 Empire 8 Athletic Conference football standings
	Conf.			Overall
Team	W		L	W		L
No. 23 Ithaca $^	5	–	1	9	–	2
Hartwick	4	–	2	7	–	3
Alfred	4	–	2	7	–	4
St. John Fisher	4	–	2	7	–	4
Springfield	2	–	4	4	–	6
Utica	2	–	4	3	–	7
Norwich	0	–	6	2	–	8
$ – Conference champion; ^ – NCAA Division III playoff participant; Rankings from D3football.com

2008 Heartland Collegiate Athletic Conference football standings
	Conf.			Overall
Team	W		L	W		L
No. 8 Franklin (IN) $^	7	–	0	11	–	2
Rose-Hulman	5	–	2	7	–	3
Anderson (IN)	4	–	3	5	–	5
Defiance	4	–	3	4	–	6
Manchester	3	–	4	5	–	5
Mount St. Joseph	3	–	4	5	–	5
Hanover	2	–	5	2	–	7
Bluffton	0	–	7	1	–	9
$ – Conference champion; ^ – NCAA Division III playoff participant; Rankings from D3football.com

2008 Iowa Intercollegiate Athletic Conference football standings
	Conf.			Overall
Team	W		L	W		L
No. 10 Wartburg $^	7	–	1	10	–	3
Buena Vista	6	–	2	7	–	3
Simpson (IA)	5	–	3	7	–	3
Loras	5	–	3	6	–	4
Central (IA)	4	–	4	6	–	4
Luther	4	–	4	5	–	5
Coe	4	–	4	4	–	6
Dubuque	1	–	7	2	–	8
Cornell (IA)	0	–	8	0	–	10
$ – Conference champion; ^ – NCAA Division III playoff participant; Rankings from D3football.com

2008 Liberty League football standings
	Conf.			Overall
Team	W		L	W		L
No. 17 Hobart $^	6	–	1	9	–	2
RPI	5	–	2	8	–	2
WPI	4	–	3	7	–	3
Union (NY)	4	–	3	5	–	4
Susquehanna	3	–	4	4	–	6
Rochester (NY)	3	–	4	3	–	7
Merchant Marine	2	–	5	3	–	7
St. Lawrence	1	–	6	1	–	9
$ – Conference champion; ^ – NCAA Division III playoff participant; Rankings from D3football.com

2008 Michigan Intercollegiate Athletic Association football standings
	Conf.			Overall
Team	W		L	W		L
No. 20 Trine $^	6	–	0	10	–	1
Adrian	5	–	1	8	–	2
Alma	3	–	3	5	–	5
Albion	3	–	3	4	–	6
Hope	3	–	3	3	–	7
Kalamazoo	1	–	5	2	–	8
Olivet	0	–	6	1	–	9
$ – Conference champion; ^ – NCAA Division III playoff participant; Rankings from D3football.com

2008 Middle Atlantic Conference football standings
	Conf.			Overall
Team	W		L	W		L
Albright +	5	–	2	8	–	3
Delaware Valley +	5	–	2	8	–	3
Lycoming +^	5	–	2	7	–	4
Lebanon Valley	4	–	3	6	–	4
Wilkes	4	–	3	4	–	6
Widener	2	–	5	4	–	6
King's	2	–	5	3	–	7
FDU Florham	1	–	6	3	–	7
+ – Conference co-champions; ^ – NCAA Division III playoff participant; Rankings from D3football.com

2008 Midwest Conference football standings
	Conf.			Overall
Team	W		L	W		L
No. 16 Monmouth (IL) $^	9	–	0	11	–	1
Ripon	8	–	1	8	–	2
St. Norbert	7	–	2	7	–	3
Carroll (WI)	6	–	3	7	–	3
Beloit	4	–	5	5	–	5
Illinois College	4	–	5	4	–	6
Lake Forest	3	–	6	3	–	7
Grinnell	2	–	7	3	–	7
Knox	2	–	7	3	–	7
Lawrence	0	–	9	1	–	9
$ – Conference champion; ^ – NCAA Division III playoff participant; Rankings from D3football.com

2008 Minnesota Intercollegiate Athletic Conference football standings
	Conf.			Overall
Team	W		L	W		L
Saint John's (MN) $^	6	–	2	8	–	3
Carleton	5	–	3	7	–	3
St. Thomas (MN)	5	–	3	7	–	3
Concordia–Moorhead	5	–	3	6	–	4
Gustavus Adolphus	4	–	4	6	–	4
St. Olaf	4	–	4	6	–	4
Bethel (MN)	4	–	4	5	–	5
Augsburg	3	–	5	5	–	5
Hamline	0	–	8	2	–	8
$ – Conference champion; ^ – NCAA Division III playoff participant

2008 New England Football Conference standings
	Conf.			Overall
Team	W		L	W		L
Bogan Division
Bridgewater State x	6	–	1	7	–	3
Maine Maritime xy	6	–	1	7	–	4
Westfield State	4	–	3	6	–	4
Fitchburg State	4	–	3	4	–	6
Framingham State	3	–	4	5	–	5
Coast Guard	3	–	4	3	–	6
Worcester State	2	–	5	2	–	8
Massachusetts Maritime	0	–	7	0	–	10
Boyd Division
Plymouth State xy$^	7	–	0	10	–	2
No. 22 Curry ^	6	–	1	10	–	2
UMass Dartmouth	4	–	3	6	–	4
MIT	3	–	4	5	–	5
Salve Regina	3	–	4	4	–	5
Western New England	3	–	4	3	–	7
Endicott	2	–	5	3	–	7
Nichols	0	–	7	2	–	8
Championship: Plymouth State 46, Maine Maritime 16
$ – Conference champion; x – Division champion/co-champions; y – Championship game participant; ^ – NCAA Division III playoff participant; Rankings from D3football.com

2008 New England Small College Athletic Conference football standings
	Conf.			Overall
Team	W		L	W		L
Trinity (CT) $	8	–	0	8	–	0
Williams	6	–	2	6	–	2
Amherst	5	–	3	5	–	3
Middlebury	5	–	3	5	–	3
Bowdoin	4	–	4	4	–	4
Tufts	4	–	4	4	–	4
Colby	3	–	5	3	–	5
Bates	2	–	6	2	–	6
Hamilton	2	–	6	2	–	6
Wesleyan	1	–	7	1	–	7
$ – Conference champion

2008 New Jersey Athletic Conference football standings
	Conf.			Overall
Team	W		L	W		L
No. 6 Cortland $^	9	–	0	11	–	2
Rowan	7	–	2	8	–	2
Montclair State	7	–	2	8	–	3
Brockport	6	–	3	7	–	4
Kean	6	–	3	7	–	4
TCNJ	4	–	5	4	–	6
William Paterson	3	–	6	4	–	6
Western Connecticut	2	–	7	2	–	8
Buffalo State	1	–	8	1	–	9
Morrisville State #	0	–	9	1	–	9
$ – Conference champion; ^ – NCAA Division III playoff participant; # – Provisional NCAA Division III member; Rankings from D3football.com

2008 North Coast Athletic Conference football standings
	Conf.			Overall
Team	W		L	W		L
No. 18 Wabash $^	7	–	0	10	–	2
Wooster	6	–	1	8	–	2
Denison	4	–	3	6	–	4
Wittenberg	4	–	3	6	–	4
Allegheny	4	–	3	5	–	5
Earlham	4	–	3	4	–	6
Hiram	2	–	5	3	–	7
Oberlin	2	–	5	2	–	8
Ohio Wesleyan	2	–	5	2	–	8
Kenyon	0	–	7	1	–	9
$ – Conference champion; ^ – NCAA Division III playoff participant; Rankings from D3football.com

2008 Northern Athletics Conference football standings
	Conf.			Overall
Team	W		L	W		L
Aurora $^	7	–	0	9	–	2
Concordia (WI)	5	–	2	5	–	5
Lakeland	5	–	2	5	–	5
Benedictine (IL)	4	–	3	4	–	6
Wisconsin Lutheran	3	–	4	4	–	6
Concordia (IL)	2	–	5	3	–	7
Rockford	2	–	5	2	–	8
Maranatha Baptist	0	–	7	0	–	10
$ – Conference champion; ^ – NCAA Division III playoff participant

2008 Northwest Conference football standings
	Conf.			Overall
Team	W		L	W		L
No. 4 Willamette $^	6	–	0	11	–	1
Linfield	5	–	1	6	–	3
Whitworth	4	–	2	6	–	3
Pacific Lutheran	3	–	3	3	–	6
Menlo	2	–	4	3	–	7
Puget Sound	1	–	5	3	–	6
Lewis & Clark	0	–	6	1	–	8
$ – Conference champion; ^ – NCAA Division III playoff participant; Rankings from D3football.com

2008 Ohio Athletic Conference football standings
	Conf.			Overall
Team	W		L	W		L
No. 1 Mount Union $^	9	–	0	15	–	0
No. 19 Otterbein ^	8	–	1	9	–	2
Baldwin–Wallace	5	–	4	5	–	5
Ohio Northern	5	–	4	5	–	5
Capital	4	–	5	5	–	5
John Carroll	4	–	5	5	–	5
Wilmington (OH)	4	–	5	4	–	6
Heidelberg	3	–	6	4	–	6
Muskingum	2	–	7	3	–	7
Marietta	1	–	8	2	–	8
$ – Conference champion; ^ – NCAA Division III playoff participant; Rankings from D3football.com

2008 Old Dominion Athletic Conference football standings
	Conf.			Overall
Team	W		L	W		L
Catholic University +	4	–	2	9	–	2
Hampden–Sydney +	4	–	2	8	–	2
Emory & Henry +	4	–	2	6	–	4
Randolph–Macon +^	4	–	2	6	–	5
Bridgewater	3	–	3	4	–	6
Guilford	1	–	5	4	–	6
Washington and Lee	1	–	5	4	–	6
+ – Conference co-champions; ^ – NCAA Division III playoff participant

2008 Presidents' Athletic Conference football standings
	Conf.			Overall
Team	W		L	W		L
Thomas More $^	6	–	0	8	–	3
No. 11 Washington & Jefferson ^	5	–	1	11	–	2
Grove City	3	–	3	6	–	4
Westminster (PA)	3	–	3	5	–	5
Waynesburg	2	–	4	5	–	5
Bethany (WV)	1	–	5	3	–	7
Thiel	1	–	5	2	–	8
Geneva #		–		5	–	5
St. Vincent #		–		1	–	9
$ – Conference champion; ^ – NCAA Division III playoff participant; # – Provisional NCAA Divisional III member; games not counted in standings; Rankings from D3football.com

2008 St. Louis Intercollegiate Athletic Conference football standings
	Conf.			Overall
Team	W		L	W		L
LaGrange $^	7	–	0	9	–	2
Huntingdon	6	–	1	8	–	2
Greenville	5	–	2	6	–	4
Westminster (MO)	4	–	3	4	–	5
Eureka *	2	–	5	3	–	6
Blackburn	2	–	5	3	–	7
MacMurray *	1	–	6	1	–	9
Principia	1	–	6	1	–	9
$ – Conference champion; ^ – NCAA Division III playoff participant; * – MacMurray later forfeited a win over Eureka.

2008 Southern California Intercollegiate Athletic Conference football standings
	Conf.			Overall
Team	W		L	W		L
No. 15 Occidental $^	6	–	0	9	–	1
Cal Lutheran	5	–	1	7	–	2
Redlands	4	–	2	7	–	2
Claremont–Mudd–Scripps	3	–	3	4	–	5
La Verne	2	–	4	2	–	7
Pomona–Pitzer	1	–	5	2	–	7
Whittier	0	–	6	1	–	8
$ – Conference champion; ^ – NCAA Division III playoff participant; Rankings from D3football.com

2008 Southern Collegiate Athletic Conference football standings
	Conf.			Overall
Team	W		L	W		L
No. 12 Millsaps $^	7	–	0	11	–	1
DePauw	5	–	2	8	–	2
Trinity (TX)	5	–	2	8	–	2
Centre	5	–	2	7	–	3
Austin	3	–	4	5	–	5
Rhodes	2	–	5	4	–	6
Sewanee	1	–	6	2	–	8
Colorado College	0	–	7	0	–	9
Birmingham–Southern #		–		3	–	7
$ – Conference champion; ^ – NCAA Division III playoff participant; # – Provisional Division III member; games not counted in standings; Rankings from D3football.com

2008 University Athletic Association football standings
	Conf.			Overall
Team	W		L	W		L
No. 21 Case Western Reserve $^	3	–	0	10	–	1
Carnegie Mellon	1	–	2	5	–	5
Washington University	1	–	2	5	–	5
Chicago	1	–	2	3	–	6
$ – Conference champion; ^ – Division III playoff participant; Rankings from D3football.com

2008 Upper Midwest Athletic Conference football standings
	Conf.			Overall
Team	W		L	W		L
Northwestern (MN) $	4	–	0	9	–	2
Crown	3	–	1	5	–	4
Martin Luther	2	–	2	7	–	3
Minnesota–Morris	1	–	3	3	–	6
St. Scholastica	0	–	4	1	–	7
$ – Conference champion

2008 USA South Athletic Conference football standings
	Conf.			Overall
Team	W		L	W		L
Christopher Newport $^	7	–	0	8	–	2
Ferrum	5	–	2	7	–	3
North Carolina Wesleyan	5	–	2	6	–	4
Averett	4	–	3	5	–	5
Maryville (TN)	4	–	3	5	–	5
Shenandoah	2	–	5	3	–	7
Methodist	1	–	6	2	–	8
Greensboro	0	–	7	2	–	8
$ – Conference champion; ^ – NCAA Division III playoff participant

2008 Wisconsin Intercollegiate Athletic Conference football standings
	Conf.			Overall
Team	W		L	W		L
No. 2 Wisconsin–Whitewater +^	6	–	1	13	–	2
No. 14 Wisconsin–Stevens Point +^	6	–	1	9	–	2
Wisconsin–Eau Claire	4	–	3	6	–	4
Wisconsin–Stout	3	–	4	5	–	5
Wisconsin–La Crosse	3	–	4	3	–	7
Wisconsin–Oshkosh	2	–	5	4	–	5
Wisconsin–Platteville	2	–	5	4	–	6
Wisconsin–River Falls	2	–	5	3	–	7
+ – Conference co-champions; ^ – NCAA Division III playoff participant; Rankings from D3football.com

2008 NCAA Division III independents football records
	Conf.			Overall
Team	W		L	W		L
Husson		–		7	–	3
Chapman		–		5	–	4
SUNY Maritime		–		4	–	5
Macalester		–		4	–	6
Mount Ida		–		4	–	6
Becker		–		2	–	7
Gallaudet		–		2	–	8

== Conference champions ==
Conference champions
- American Southwest Conference – Mary Hardin–Baylor
- Atlantic Central Football Conference – Wesley
- Centennial Conference – Muhlenberg
- College Conference of Illinois and Wisconsin – North Central (IL)
- Empire 8 Conference – Ithaca
- Heartland Collegiate Athletic Conference – Franklin
- Iowa Intercollegiate Athletic Conference – Wartburg
- Liberty League – Hobart
- Michigan Intercollegiate Athletic Association – Trine
- Middle Atlantic Conference – Albright, Delaware Valley, and Lycoming
- Midwest Conference – Monmouth (IL)
- Minnesota Intercollegiate Athletic Conference – Saint John's (MN)
- New England Football Conference – Bridgewater State and Maine Maritime (Bogan Division), Plymouth State (Boyd Division)
  - Championship Game: Plymouth State 46, Maine Maritime 16
- New England Small College Athletic Conference – Trinity (CT)
- New Jersey Athletic Conference – SUNY Cortland
- North Coast Athletic Conference – Wabash
- Northern Athletics Collegiate Conference – Aurora
- Northwest Conference – Willamette
- Ohio Athletic Conference – Mount Union
- Old Dominion Athletic Conference – Catholic, Emory & Henry, Hampden–Sydney, and Randolph-Macon
- Presidents' Athletic Conference – Thomas More
- Southern California Intercollegiate Athletic Conference – Occidental
- Southern Collegiate Athletic Conference – Millsaps
- University Athletic Association – Case Western Reserve
- Upper Midwest Athletic Conference – Northwestern–St. Paul
- USA South Athletic Conference – Christopher Newport
- Wisconsin Intercollegiate Athletic Conference – Wisconsin–Stevens Point and Wisconsin–Whitewater

== Postseason ==
The 2008 NCAA Division III Football Championship playoffs were the 36th annual single-elimination tournament to determine the national champion of men's NCAA Division III college football. The championship Stagg Bowl game was held at Salem Football Stadium in Salem, Virginia for the 16th time.

=== Qualification ===
Twenty-three conferences met the requirements for an automatic ("Pool A") bid to the playoffs. Besides the NESCAC, which does not participate in the playoffs, four conferences had no Pool A bid. The SLIAC was in the first year of the two-year waiting period, while the ACFC, UAA, and UMAC failed to meet the seven-member requirement. The NWC received a Pool A bid for the first time, having attained seven members and passed through the waiting period.

Schools not in Pool A conferences were eligible for Pool B. The number of Pool B bids was determined by calculating the ratio of Pool A conferences to schools in those conferences and applying that ratio to the number of Pool B schools. The 23 Pool A conferences contained 197 schools, an average of 8.6 teams per conference. Twenty-seven schools were in Pool B, enough for three bids.

The remaining six playoff spots were at-large ("Pool C") teams.

=== Playoff bracket ===
First Round; Campus Sites
Mount Union	56
Randolph–Macon	0
Hobart	33
Lycoming	15
Cortland	31
Plymouth State	14
Curry	26
Ithaca	21
North Central (IL)	44
Thomas More	23
Franklin	62
Otterbein	45
Wabash	20
Case Western Reserve	17
Wheaton (IL)	14
Trine	0
Willamette	48
Occidental	33
Wisconsin–Whitewater	37
Saint John's	7
Wartburg	26
Wisconsin–Stevens Point	21
Monmouth (IL)	42
Aurora	13
Millsaps	51
LaGrange	26
Washington & Jefferson	35
Christopher Newport	29
Wesley	20
Muhlenberg	0
Mary Hardin–Baylor	38
Hardin–Simmons	35

Second Round; Campus Sites
Mount Union	42
Hobart	7
Cortland	42
Curry	0
North Central (IL)	28
Franklin	38
Wabash	28
Wheaton (IL)	59
Willamette	27
Wisconsin–Whitewater	30
Wartburg	30
Monmouth (IL)	28
Washington & Jefferson	35
Millsaps	20
Wesley	14
Mary Hardin–Baylor	46

Quarterfinals; Campus Sites
Mount Union	41
Cortland	14
Franklin	28
Wheaton (IL)	45
Wisconsin–Whitewater	34
Wartburg	17
Washington & Jefferson	7
Mary Hardin–Baylor	63

Semifinals; Campus Sites
Mount Union	45
Wheaton (IL)	24
Wisconsin–Whitewater	39
Mary Hardin–Baylor	13

National Championship Game; Salem Football Stadium; Salem, Virginia
Mount Union	31
Wisconsin–Whitewater	26

* Overtime

== See also ==
- 2008 NCAA Division I FBS football season
- 2008 NCAA Division I FCS football season
- 2008 NCAA Division II football season
