= Salem Football Stadium =

Sports venue in Salem, Virginia

Salem Stadium
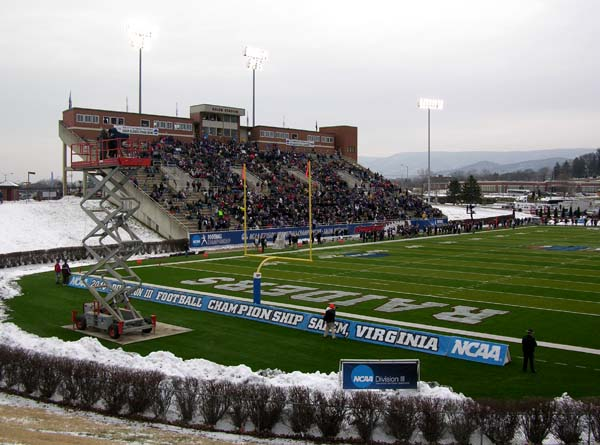
- The stadium during the 2010 Stagg Bowl
- Interactive map of Salem Stadium
- Full name: Willis White Field at Salem Stadium
- Address: 1001 Roanoke Boulevard; Salem, Virginia; United States
- Coordinates: 37.287672°N 80.036454°W
- Owner: City of Salem
- Capacity: 7,157
- Type: Stadium
- Surface: FieldTurf
- Current use: Football

Construction
- Opened: 1985

Tenants
- Stagg Bowl (1993–2017, 2023, 2027); NCFA Championship (2012–2015); Roanoke Maroons (NCAA) (2024–present); Salem Spartans (VHSL) (1985–present)

Salem Stadium is a stadium in Salem, Virginia, United States. It is primarily used for American football and hosts the home football games of the Salem High School Spartans and for the Roanoke College Maroons. It was built in 1985 and seats 7,157 people. The stadium is part of the James E. Taliaferro Sports and Entertainment Complex (named after a former mayor of Salem), which also includes the Salem Civic Center and the Salem Memorial Baseball Stadium.

Salem Stadium hosted the NCAA Division III national football championship game, known as the Amos Alonzo Stagg Bowl, from 1993 to 2017, and again in 2023 and 2027. From 2012 to 2015, the National Club Football Association, which sanctions most club football in U.S. colleges, also held its championship games at Salem Stadium; for 2016, Salem was designated as a semifinal site for the NCFA playoffs, but play was moved to the smaller Salem High School.

In 2015, the natural playing surface was replaced by FieldTurf in an effort to ensure that the Stagg Bowl would continue to be played in Salem. The field was named the "Willis White Field" in honor of the former head football coach at Salem High School. Salem Stadium also currently hosts the Virginia High School League football state championships in Class 1 and Class 2 as well as the Southwestern Virginia Educational Classic, an annual contest between two football teams from historically black colleges and universities.

In June 2023, local institution Roanoke College announced they would be reviving the school's football program and that the team would play their home games at Salem Football Stadium. The Maroons played a club season in 2024 and became full-fledged members of the Old Dominion Athletic Conference in 2025.
