= Eldon Tharp =

American football coach (1908–1979)

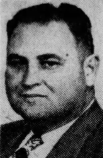

Biographical details
- Born: December 23, 1908; Dallas, Iowa, U.S.
- Died: March 30, 1979 (aged 70); Gilman, Iowa, U.S.
- Education: Iowa State College

Playing career

Football
- 1928–1931: Central (IA)
- Position: Guard

Coaching career (HC unless noted)

Football
- 1944: Central (IA) (assistant)
- 1945: Central (IA)
- 1946: Central (IA) (assistant)

Men's basketball
- 1932–1937?: Pleasant Plain HS (IA)

Women's basketball
- 1932–1937?: Pleasant Plain HS (IA)

Baseball
- 1947: Central (IA) (assistant)

Head coaching record
- Overall: 7–1 (college football)

Accomplishments and honors

Championships
- 1 Iowa (1946)

Carroll Eldon Tharp (December 23, 1908 – March 30, 1979) was an American college football coach. He was the head football coach for Central College in 1945.

== Playing and coaching career ==
Tharp played college football for Central College as a guard under head coach Len Winter and alongside Richard Tysseling. He also saw time as a fullback at the beginning of the 1929 season.

Following Tharp's graduation from Central, he was hired as the head basketball coach for Pleasant Plain High School in Pleasant Plain, Iowa, in both men and women's basketball. By 1935, the men's team had won the Jersey County Six Conference championship three times, with the women's team also seeing moderate success.

In 1944, Tharp returned to Central as an assistant football coach under Tunis Prins. In the following year, Tharp "filled in" for former teammate Tysseling, who was still serving in the United States Navy. In Tharp's lone season as head coach, he led the team to a 7–1 record and a perfect 5–0 record in Iowa Conference play to finish as conference champions. He returned the following year as an assistant to Tysseling. Tharp remained with the school until at least 1947, when he was serving as an assistant baseball coach.

== Personal life ==
In February 1929, Tharp married Jean De Reus. In the summer of 1931, he attended industrial arts classes at Iowa State College—now known as Iowa State University.

Prior to returning to Central, Tharp bought a restaurant in Pella, Iowa.

== Head coaching record ==
=== College football ===
| Year | Team | Overall | Conference | Standing | Bowl/playoffs |
|---|---|---|---|---|---|
Central Dutch (Iowa Conference) (1945)
| 1945 | Central | 7–1 | 5–0 | 1st | |
| Central: | | 7–1 | 5–0 | | |
| Total: | | 7–1 | | | |
National championship Conference title Conference division title or championship game berth
