= Tunis Prins =

American football coach (1895–1949)

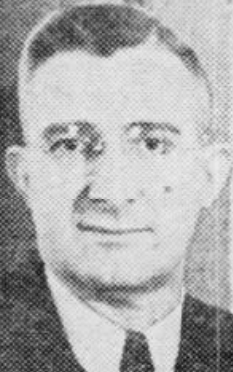
- Prins in 1943

Biographical details
- Born: August 7, 1895; Sioux Center, Iowa, U.S.
- Died: July 21, 1949 (aged 53); Iowa City, Iowa, U.S.
- Education: Hope College (1920); New Brunswick Theological Seminary (1923); University of Michigan; Princeton University

Playing career

Basketball
- 1913–1916: Hope
- 1919–1920: Hope
- Positions: Guard, forward

Coaching career (HC unless noted)

Football
- 1943–1944: Central (IA)

Administrative career (AD unless noted)
- 1943–1945: Central (IA)

Head coaching record
- Overall: 6–5

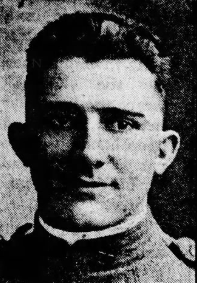
Tunis Prins in 1918

Teunis Wayenberg Prins (commonly spelled Tunis) (August 7, 1895 – June 21, 1949) was an American pastor, college football coach, athletics administrator, and educator.

== Biography ==
Prins was born on August 7, 1895, in Sioux Center, Iowa. Prins enrolled at Hope College in 1913 and was a guard and forward on the school's basketball team. In 1915, he was voted as team captain. He and his brother, Peter, enlisted in the United States Armed Forces during World War I. The brothers returned to Hope in 1919 and Tunis was a member of the state championship basketball team in 1920. Following his graduation he enrolled at New Brunswick Theological Seminary.

While attended New Brunswick, Prins was named as the pastor for the Whitehouse Reformed Church in Whitehouse Station, New Jersey. He resigned in 1926 to become the pastor at a church in Herkimer, New York. Throughout that time, Prins had attended the University of Michigan and Princeton University.

In 1938, Prins was named as the director of intramural athletics alongside become a professor of physical education for Central College. In 1943, after athletic director and head football coach Richard Tysseling was commissioned into the United States Navy, Prins took over the roles. In two seasons he led the team to an overall record of 6–5 before resigning after the 1944 season. In 1944, he hired future Central head coach Eldon Tharp as an assistant coach.

Prins remained with Central after Tysseling returned, reverting back to director of intramural athletics. He remained with the school until his death on July 21, 1949. Leading up to his death, Prins had received surgery at the University of Iowa Hospitals & Clinics.

== Head coaching record ==
Year	Team	Overall	Conference	Standing	Bowl/playoffs
Central Dutch (Iowa Conference) (1943–1944)
1943	Central	4–3			
1944	Central	2–2			
Central:		6–5			
Total:		6–5			
