= List of presidents of the American Football Coaches Association =

Presidents of the American Football Coaches Association are:

List of American Football Coaches Association presidents
Year	President	School
1921	Charles Dudley Daly	Army
1922	Charles Dudley Daly	Army
1923	John Heisman	Penn
1924	John Heisman	Rice
1925	Robert Zuppke	Illinois
1926	Gil Dobie	Cornell
1927	Butch Cowell	New Hampshire
1928	Bill Roper	Princeton
1929	Hugo Bezdek	Penn State
1930	William Alexander	Georgia Tech
1931	Chick Meehan	Manhattan
1932	Mal Stevens	Yale
1933	Dan McGugin	Vanderbilt
1934	Dana X. Bible	Nebraska
1935	Bernie Bierman	Minnesota
1936	Tuss McLaughry	Brown
1937	Harry Kipke	Michigan
1938	Harry Stuhldreher	Wisconsin
1939	Lou Little	Columbia
1940	Bo McMillin	Indiana
1941	Fritz Crisler	Michigan
1942	Matty Bell	SMU
1943	Matty Bell	SMU
1944	Ray Morrison	Temple
1945	Ray Morrison	Temple
1946	Dick Harlow	Harvard
1947	Tad Wieman	Maine
1948	Harvey Harman	Rutgers
1949	Dutch Meyer	TCU
1950	Pappy Waldorf	California
1951	Lloyd Jordan	Harvard
1952	Carl Snavely	North Carolina
1953	Don Faurot	Missouri
1954	George Munger	Penn
1955	Ray Eliot	Illinois
1956	Jess Neely	Rice
1957	George K. James	Cornell
1958	Bud Wilkinson	Oklahoma
1959	Wally Butts	Georgia
1960	Rip Engle	Penn State
1961	Jack Curtice	Stanford
1962	William D. Murray	Duke
1963	Woody Hayes	Ohio State
1964	Len Casanova	Oregon
1965	Abe Martin	TCU
1966	Dan Jessee	Trinity (CT)
1967	Ben Schwartzwalder	Syracuse
1968	Murray Warmath	Minnesota
1969	Paul Dietzel	South Carolina
1970	Frank Broyles	Arkansas
1971	Earle Edwards	NC State
1972	Bear Bryant	Alabama
1973	John McKay	USC
1974	Bob Blackman	Illinois
1975	Darrell Royal	Texas
1976	Eddie Robinson	Grambling State
1977	Ben Martin	Air Force
1978	Carmen Cozza	Yale
1979	Charles McClendon	LSU
1980	Jerry Claiborne	Maryland
1981	Tubby Raymond	Delaware
1982	Jim Ostendarp	Amherst
1983	Bo Schembechler	Michigan
1984	Dave Maurer	Wittenberg
1985	Vince Dooley	Georgia
1986	Vic Rowen	San Francisco State
1987	LaVell Edwards	BYU
1988	Joe Restic	Harvard
1989	Don James	Washington
1990	Johnny Majors	Tennessee
1991	Bill Manlove	Widener
1992	John Cooper	Ohio State
1993	Hayden Fry	Iowa
1994	Ron Schipper	Central (IA)
1995	Billy Joe	Florida A&M
1996	Fisher DeBerry	Air Force
1997	Don Nehlen	West Virginia
1998	Roy Kidd	Western Kentucky
1999	Rocky Rees	Shippensburg
2000	Bob Ford	Albany
2001	Joe Taylor	Hampton
2002	Glen Mason	Minnesota
2003	Phil Fulmer	Tennessee
2004	Ken Hatfield	Rice
2005	Scot Dapp	Moravian
2006	Mel Tjeerdsma	Northwest Missouri State
2007	Ken Sparks	Carson–Newman
2008	Tyrone Willingham	Washington
2009	Dick Tomey	San Jose State
2010	Larry Kehres	Mount Union
2011	Rob Ash	Montana State
2012	Tim Murphy	Harvard
2013	Mack Brown	Texas
2014	Mike Welch	Ithaca
2015	Tommy Tuberville	Cincinnati
2016	Lee Owens	Ashland
2017	Rich Rodriguez	Arizona
2018	Bill Cronin	Georgetown (KY)
2019	Frank Solich	Ohio
2020	Gary Patterson	TCU
2021	Pat Fitzgerald	Northwestern
2022	Craig Bohl	Wyoming
2023	Todd Knight	Ouachita Baptist
2024	Jeff McMartin	Central (IA)
2025	Bobby Hauck	Montana
2026	Clark Lea	Vanderbilt

According to AFCA tradition officers move up one office each year until becoming president.
