= 1946 Iowa Conference football season =

- Sport: Football
- Teams: 13
- Co-champions: Central (IA), Upper Iowa

Football seasons
- 1945 1947

1946 Iowa Conference football standings
	Conf.					Overall
Team	W		L		T	W		L		T
Central (IA) +	6	–	0	–	0	7	–	1	–	0
Upper Iowa +	6	–	0	–	0	6	–	0	–	0
St. Ambrose	1	–	0	–	0	5	–	3	–	0
Parsons	4	–	2	–	0	4	–	4	–	0
Dubuque	4	–	3	–	0	5	–	4	–	0
Luther	3	–	2	–	0	3	–	6	–	0
Simpson (IA)	2	–	3	–	0	3	–	5	–	1
Iowa Wesleyan	1	–	4	–	0	3	–	6	–	0
Buena Vista	1	–	4	–	0	1	–	6	–	0
Wartburg	1	–	5	–	0	2	–	5	–	0
Western Union	0	–	1	–	0	5	–	2	–	0
Loras	0	–	1	–	0	1	–	7	–	0
William Penn	0	–	4	–	0	0	–	6	–	0
+ – Conference co-champions

The 1946 Iowa Conference football season was the season of college football played by the 13 member schools of the Iowa Conference as part of the 1946 college football season. The Central Dutch and Upper Iowa Peacocks were co-champions of the conference, each compiling perfect 6–0 records against conference opponents. None of the Iowa Conference teams was ranked in the Associated Press poll or played in a bowl game.

== Conference overview ==
Conf. rank	Team	Head coach	Conf. record	Overall record	Points scored	Points against
1 (tie)	Central (IA)	Richard Tysseling	6–0	7–1	223	38
1 (tie)	Upper Iowa	John "Doc" Dorman	6–0	6–0	139	31
3	St. Ambrose	Ennio Arboit	1–0	5–3	101	77
4	Parsons	Phillip E. Young	4–2	4–4	116	104
5	Dubuque	Kenneth E. Mercer	4–3	5–4	92	76
6	Luther	Robert Bungum	3–2	3–6	81	136
7	Simpson (IA)	Frank Casey	2–3	3–5	79	135
8 (tie)	Iowa Wesleyan	Olan Ruble	1–4	3–6	75	159
8 (tie)	Buena Vista	Harland Riebe	1–4	1–6	38	103
10	Wartburg	Stanley Hall	1–5	2–5	85	124
11 (tie)	Western Union	Dick Crayne	0–1	5–2	117	70
11 (tie)	Loras	Vince Dowd	0–1	1–7	43	181
13	William Penn	Roland Ortmayer	0–4	0–6	12	174

== Teams ==
=== Central ===
1946 Central Dutch football
- Conference: Iowa Conference
- Record: 7–1 (6–0 Iowa)
- Head coach: Richard Tysseling (8th season)

The 1946 Central Dutch football team was an American football team that represented Central College of Pella, Iowa, as a member of the Iowa Conference during the 1946 college football season. Led by eight-year head coach Richard Tysseling, the Dutch compiled a 7–1 record, shared the Iowa Conference championship with Upper Iowa, and outscored opponents by a total of 223 to 38.

Date	Opponent	Site	Result	Source
September 20	Tarkio*	Pella, IA	W 44–0	
September 27	at Grinnell*	Grinnell, IA	L 0–6	
October 4	Wartburg	Pella, IA	W 33–7	
October 12	at Parsons	Fairfield, IA	W 26–6	
October 19	at Dubuque	Dubuque, IA	W 33–7	
October 25	Iowa Wesleyan	Pella, IA	W 45-0	
November 2	Simpson (IA)^{†}	Pella, IA	W 21–6	
November 18	at Luther	Decorah, IA	W 21–6	
*Non-conference game; ^{†}Homecoming

=== Upper Iowa ===
1946 Upper Iowa Peacocks football
- Conference: Iowa Conference
- Record: 6–0 (6–0 Iowa)
- Head coach: John "Doc" Dorman (37th season)

The 1946 Upper Iowa Peacocks football team was an American football team that represented Upper Iowa University as a member of the Iowa Conference during the 1946 college football season. In their 37th season under head coach John "Doc" Dorman, the Peacocks compiled a 6–0 record, shared the Iowa Conference championship with Central Central (IA), and outscored opponents by a total of 139 to 31.

Upper Iowa end Melvin Harms was a unanimous choice by the United Press for the 1946 All-Iowa Conference football team. Quarterback Sam Turner and guard Ralph Bartlett also received first-team honors.

The university had an enrollment of 500 students in the fall of 1946, at least 300 of whom were freshmen.

Date	Opponent	Site	Result	Source
September 28	Buena Vista	Dorman Field; Fayette, IA	W 39–6	
October 11	at William Penn	Oskaloosa, IA	W 33–6	
October 19	Luther	Dorman Field; Fayette, IA	W 28–0	
October 26	at Parsons	Fairfield, IA	W 7–6	
November 2	Dubuque^{†}	Dorman Field; Fayette, IA	W 12–0	
November 9	Wartburg	Dorman Field; Fayette, IA	W 20–13	
^{†}Homecoming

=== St. Ambrose ===
1946 St. Ambrose Bees football
- Conference: Iowa Conference
- Record: 5–3 (1–0 Iowa)
- Head coach: Ennio Arboit (1st season)
- Home stadium: Davenport Municipal Stadium

The 1946 St. Ambrose Bees football team was an American football team that represented St. Ambrose University of Davenport, Iowa, as a member of the Iowa Conference during the 1946 college football season. Led by Ennio Arboit in his first and only season as head coach, the Bees compiled a 5–3 record, finished in third place in the Iowa Conference, and outscored opponents by a total of 101 to 77.

Date	Opponent	Site	Result	Attendance	Source
September 20	at Drake*	Drake Stadium; Des Moines, IA	L 13–26	12,000	
September 29	at Xavier*	Xavier Stadium; Cincinnati, OH	W 3–0	8,000–10,000	
October 6	Loras	Davenport Municipal Stadium; Davenport, IA	W 32–6	6,000	
October 12	at Augustana (IL)	Rock Island High School stadium; Rock Island, IL	W 19–0	3,500	
October 20	at St. Thomas*	Saint Paul, MN	W 13–12	4,000	
October 27	Saint Joseph's*	Davenport Municipal Stadium; Davenport, IA	W 14–7	5,000	
November 10	St. Norbert	Davenport Municipal Stadium; Davenport, IA	L 7–19	5,500	
November 15	Bradley	Davenport Municipal Stadium; Davenport, IA	L 0–7	6,000	
*Non-conference game

=== Parsons ===
1946 Parsons Wildcats football
- Conference: Iowa Conference
- Record: 4–4 (4–2 Iowa)
- Head coach: Phillip E. Young (1st season)

The 1946 Parsons Wildcats football team was an American football team that represented Parsons College of Fairfield, Iowa, as a member of the Iowa Conference during the 1946 college football season. Led by first-year head coach Phillip E. Young, the Wildcats compiled a 4–4 record, finished in fourth place in the Iowa Conference, and outscored opponents by a total of 116 to 104.

Date	Opponent	Site	Result	Attendance	Source
September 28	at Monmouth*	Monmouth, IL	L 0–26		
	Kirksville		L 6–25		
	Central		L 6–26		
	Simpson (IA)		W 20–14		
	Upper Iowa		L 6–7		
	Iowa Wesleyan		W 20–0		
	William Penn		W 45–0		
	Buena Vista		W 13–6		
*Non-conference game

=== Dubuque ===
1946 Dubuque Spartans football
- Conference: Iowa Conference
- Record: 5–4 (4–3 Iowa)
- Head coach: Kenneth E. Mercer (6th season)

The 1946 Dubuque Spartans football team was an American football team that represented the University of Dubuque of Dubuque, Iowa, as a member of the Iowa Conference during the 1946 college football season. Led by head coach Kenneth E. Mercer, the Spartans compiled a 5–4 record, finished in fifth place in the Iowa Conference, and outscored opponents by a total of 92 to 76.

Date	Opponent	Site	Result	Source
	Buena Vista		W 7–0	
September 2	Knox*	Dubuque, IA	W 2–0	
	William Penn		W 43–0	
	Wartburg		W 13–0	
	Central (IA)		L 7–33	
	Luther		L 7–19	
	Upper Iowa		L 0–12	
	Iowa Wesleyan		W 13–6	
	Culver-Stockton		T 0–0	
*Non-conference game

=== Luther ===
1946 Luther Norse football
- Conference: Iowa Conference
- Record: 3–6 (3–2 Iowa)
- Head coach: Robert Bungum (1st season)

The 1946 Luther Norse football team was an American football team that represented the Luther College of Decorah, Iowa, as a member of the Iowa Conference during the 1946 college football season. Led by first-year head coach Robert Bungum, the Spartans compiled a 3–6 record, finished in sixth place in the Iowa Conference, and were outscored by a total of 136 to 81.

Date	Opponent	Site	Result	Attendance	Source
September 20	at North Dakota*	Memorial Stadium; Grand Forks, ND	L 6–12		
	Hamline		L 0–26		
October 5	at Coe*	Cedar Rapids, IA	L 6–10		
	St. Olaf		L 13–19		
	Upper Iowa		L 0–28		
	Dubuque		W 19–7		
	Wartburg		W 24–13		
	Simpson (IA)		W 7–0		
	Central (IA)		L 6–21		
*Non-conference game

=== Simpson ===
1946 Simpson Redmen football
- Conference: Iowa Conference
- Record: 3–5 (2–3 Iowa)
- Head coach: Frank Casey (5th season)

The 1946 Simpson Redmen football team was an American football team that represented the Simpson College of Indianola, Iowa, as a member of the Iowa Conference during the 1946 college football season. Led by fifth-year head coach Frank Casey, the Redmen compiled a 3–5 record, finished in seventh place in the Iowa Conference, and were outscored by a total of 135 to 79.

Date	Opponent	Site	Result	Attendance	Source
September 20	Doane*	Indianola, IA	W 14–0		
September 28	at Nebraska Wesleyan	O. N. Magee Memorial Stadium; Lincoln, NE	T 6–6	4,000	
October 4	Missouri Valley*		L 6–34		
October 12	at Cornell College*	Mount Vernon, IA	L 0–27		
	Parsons		L 14–20		
	Wartburg		W 20–8		
	Central (IA)		L 5–21		
	Luther		L 0–7		
	Iowa Wesleyan		W 13–12		
*Non-conference game

=== Iowa Wesleyan ===
1946 Iowa Wesleyan Tigers football
- Conference: Iowa Conference
- Record: 3–6 (1–4 Iowa)
- Head coach: Olan Ruble (4th season)

The 1946 Iowa Wesleyan Tigers football team was an American football team that represented the Iowa Wesleyan University of Mount Pleasant, Iowa, as a member of the Iowa Conference during the 1946 college football season. Led by fourth-year head coach Olan Ruble, the Tigers compiled a 3–6 record, tied for eighth place in the Iowa Conference, and were outscored by a total of 159 to 75.

Date	Opponent	Site	Result	Source
	Kirksville		L 0–19	
	Culver-Stockton		W 12–9	
	Drake "B" team		W 13–7	
	Washburn		L 6–27	
	Penn		W 26–6	
	Central (IA)		L 0–45	
	Parsons		L 0–20	
	Dubuque		L 6–13	
	Simpson (IA)		L 12–13	

=== Buena Vista ===
1946 Buena Vista Beavers football
- Conference: Iowa Conference
- Record: 1–6 (1–4 Iowa)
- Head coach: Harland Riebe (1st season)

The 1946 Buena Vista Beavers football team was an American football team that represented the Buena Vista University of Storm Lake, Iowa, as a member of the Iowa Conference during the 1946 college football season. Led by Harland Riebe in his first and only season as head coach, the Beavers compiled a 1–6 record, tied for eighth place in the Iowa Conference, and were outscored by a total of 103 to 38.

Date	Opponent	Site	Result	Source
	Dubuque		W 0–7	
	Upper Iowa		L 6–39	
	Huron		L 0–12	
	Wartburg		L 7–12	
	Western Union		W 14–6	
	Yankton		L 6–14	
	Parsons		L 6–13	

=== Wartburg ===
1946 Wartburg Knights football
- Conference: Iowa Conference
- Record: 2–5 (1–5 Iowa)
- Head coach: Stanley Hall (1st season)

The 1946 Wartburg Knights football team was an American football team that represented the Wartburg College of Waverly, Iowa, as a member of the Iowa Conference during the 1946 college football season. Led by Stanley Hall in his first and only season as head coach, the Knights compiled a 2–5 record, finished in tenth place in the Iowa Conference, and were outscored by a total of 124 to 85.

Date	Opponent	Site	Result	Attendance	Source
September 28	Carthage*	Waverly, IA	W 32–7		
October 4	at Central (IA)	Pella, IA	L 7–33		
	Dubuque		L 0–13		
	Buena Vista		W 12–7		
	Simpson (IA)		L 8–20		
	Luther		L 13–24		
November 9	at Upper Iowa	Dorman Field; Fayette, IA	L 13–20		
*Non-conference game

=== Western Union ===
1946 Western Union Eagles football
- Conference: Iowa Conference
- Record: 5–2 (0–1 Iowa)
- Head coach: Dick Crayne (5th season)

The 1946 Western Union Eagles football team was an American football team that represented Western Union College of LeMars, Iowa (later renamed Westmar University), as a member of the Iowa Conference during the 1946 college football season. Led by fifth-year head coach Dick Crayne, the Eagles compiled a 5–2 record, finished in a tie for 11th place in the Iowa Conference, and outscored opponents by a total of 117 to 70.

Date	Opponent	Site	Result	Source
September 20	Eastern State Teachers		W 31–6	
	Dakota Wesleyan		W 7–6	
	Yankton		W 8–0	
	Sioux Falls		W 33–0	
	Huron		W 26–0	
	Buena Vista		L 6–13	
November 2	at Arkansas Tech*	Russellville, AR	L 6–45	
*Non-conference game

=== Loras ===
1946 Loras Duhawks football
- Conference: Iowa Conference
- Record: 1–7 (0–1 Iowa)
- Head coach: Vince Dowd (4th season)

The 1946 Loras Duhawks football team was an American football team that represented Loras College of Dubuque, Iowa as a member of the Iowa Conference during the 1946 college football season. Led by Vince Dowd in his fourth and final season as head coach, the Duhawks compiled a 1–7 record, finished in a tie for 11th place in the Iowa Conference, and were outscored opponents by a total of 181 to 43.

Date	Opponent	Site	Result	Attendance	Source
September 21	South Dakota State*	Dubuque, IA	W 23–18	4,500	
September 28	at St. John's (MN)*	Collegeville, MN	L 0–27		
October 6	at St. Ambrose	Davenport Municipal Stadium; Davenport, IA	L 6–32	6,000	
October 13	St. Joseph's*	Dubuque, IA	L 0–13	4,000	
October 19	St. Norbert*	J. R. Minahan Stadium; De Pere, WI	L 7–20	3,300	
October 27	Saint Mary's (MN)*	Dubuque, IA	L 0–26	5,000	
November 3	St. Thomas*	Dubuque, IA	L 7–19		
November 9	Wheaton*		L 0–26		
*Non-conference game

=== William Penn ===
1946 William Penn Quakers football
- Conference: Iowa Conference
- Record: 0–6 (0–4 Iowa)
- Head coach: Roland Ortmayer (1st season)

The 1946 William Penn Quakers football team was an American football team that represented William Penn University of Oskaloosa, Iowa as a member of the Iowa Conference during the 1946 college football season. Led by first-year head coach Roland Ortmayer, the Quakers compiled a 0–6 record, finished in last place in the Iowa Conference, and were outscored opponents by a total of 174 to 12.

Date	Opponent	Site	Result	Source
	Dubuque		L 0–43	
	Upper Iowa		L 6–33	
	Iowa Wesleyan		L 6–26	
	Burlington JC*		L 0–27	
	Parsons		L 0–45	
*Non-conference game

== All-conference team ==
The following players were selected by the United Press to the 1946 All-Iowa Conference football team:

- Quarterback: Sam Turner, Upper Iowa
- Halfbacks: Bill Schumaker, Parsons; Galen Cheuvront, Central
- Fullback: Bob Sellgren, Dubuque
- Ends: Melvin Harms, Upper Iowa; Howard Lowe, Central
- Tackles: Floyd Lundquist, Parsons; Chet Cross, Central
- Guards: Bob Berg, Parsons; Ralph Bartlett, Upper Iowa
- Center: Bob Kuefler, Dubuque
