= 1967 Central Dutch football team =

American college football season

1967 Central Dutch football

Iowa Conference champion
- Conference: Iowa Conference
- Record: 9–0 (7–0 Iowa)
- Head coach: Ron Schipper (4th season)

1967 Iowa Conference football standings
| | Conf. | | | | | Overall |
| Team | W | | L | | T | W | | L | | T |
|---|---|---|---|---|---|---|---|---|---|---|
| No. 11 Central (IA) $ | 7 | – | 0 | – | 0 | 9 | – | 0 | – | 0 |
| Simpson (IA) | 6 | – | 1 | – | 0 | 7 | – | 1 | – | 1 |
| Luther | 4 | – | 2 | – | 1 | 4 | – | 4 | – | 1 |
| William Penn | 3 | – | 4 | – | 0 | 4 | – | 5 | – | 0 |
| Upper Iowa | 2 | – | 4 | – | 1 | 3 | – | 5 | – | 1 |
| Buena Vista | 2 | – | 5 | – | 0 | 2 | – | 6 | – | 0 |
| Dubuque | 1 | – | 4 | – | 2 | 1 | – | 6 | – | 2 |
| Wartburg | 1 | – | 6 | – | 0 | 1 | – | 8 | – | 0 |
$ – Conference champion; Rankings from NAIA poll

The 1967 Central Dutch football team was an American football team that represented Central College of Pella, Iowa, as a member of the Iowa Conference during the 1967 NAIA football season. In their fourth season under head coach Ron Schipper, the Dutch compiled an 9–0 record (7–0 against conference opponents), won the Iowa Conference championship, and outscored opponents by a total of 242 to 54. It was Central's second consecutive undefeated regular season, though the 1966 team lost to Wisconsin-Whitewater in the NAIA playoffs.

Senior tailback Doug van Boven set school records (later surpassed) with (i) 263 rushing yards in 25 carries (10.5 average) in a game against North Central, and (ii) 1,422 rushing yards for the season. Van Boven had not played organized football before enrolling at Central; he joined the Central football team was a walk-on. His 1,422 rushing yards led the NAIA, and his 102 points scored (on 17 toouchdowns) ranked seventh nationally. At the end of the 1967 season, he was selected as the team's most valuable player and received second-team honors on the 1967 Little All-America college football team.

Seven Central players won all-conference honors: Van Boven; offensive linemen Ken Piazza and Gary Van Hulzen; defensive lineman Larry Embling; and defensive backs Gary Auxier, Nick Cookas, and Rich Vets.

The team played its home games at in Pella, Iowa.

== Schedule ==
| Date | Opponent | Site | Result | Attendance | Source |
|---|---|---|---|---|---|
| September 16 | at North Central (IL)* | Naperville, IL | W 39–12 | | |
| September 23 | at Simpson | Indianola, IA | W 26–14 | | |
| September 30 | Upper Iowa | Pella, IA | W 31–0 | | |
| October 7 | at William Penn | Oskaloosa, IA | W 27–7 | | |
| October 14 | Wartburg | Pella, IA | W 33–0 | | |
| October 21 | Dubuque | Pella, IA | W 12–0 | | |
| October 28 | at Luther | Decorah, IA | W 14–7 | | |
| November 4 | Buena Vista | Pella, IA | W 43–0 | | |
| November 11 | at Winona State* | Winona, MN | W 17–14 | | |
*Non-conference game
