= William Douthirt =

American football coach (1900–1981)

Biographical details
- Born: September 28, 1900; Lincoln, Missouri, U.S.
- Died: August 19, 1981 (aged 80); Loma Linda, California, U.S.
- Education: Tarkio College (1924); University of Southern California

Coaching career (HC unless noted)

Football
- 1924–1926: Columbus Community HS (IA)
- 1927: Central (IA)
- 1928–1929: Rawlins HS (WY)
- 1930–1955: South Pasadena MS (CA)

Basketball
- 1924–1927: Columbus Community HS (IA)
- 1927–1928: Central (IA)
- 1930–1956: South Pasadena MS (CA)

Track and field
- 1924–1927: Columbus Community HS (IA)
- 1931–1956: South Pasadena MS (CA)

Tennis
- 1931–1956: South Pasadena MS (CA)

Head coaching record
- Overall: 1–8 (college football); 2–15 (college basketball)

William John Douthirt (September 28, 1900 – August 19, 1981) was an American college, high school, and junior high school athletics coach and administrator.

== Biography ==
Douthirt was born on September 28, 1900, in Lincoln, Missouri. He attended Tarkio College. He graduated in 1924 and accepted a position as the head football, basketball, and track and field coach for Columbus Community High School. In his last two years as football coach, the team had only lost a combined two games. The basketball and track and field teams saw similar success as the basketball team won the Louisa County Basketball Tournament. After three seasons with the school he resigned to become the head football coach for Central College. In one season he led the team to a 1–7 record. From 1928 to 1929 he coached the football team for Rawlins High School.

In 1930, Douthirt married Elizabeth Lemen in Glendale, California. She died in 1943 after several years battling an illness. Sometime before his death remarried to Ruby Douthirt.

After two seasons with Rawlins, Douthirt became the head football, basketball, track and field, and tennis coach for South Pasadena Junior High School. Alongside his coaching roles he was the head of physical education. During the summer of 1931, he enrolled at summer classes at the University of Southern California in pursuit of a master's degree in physical education. In 1938, he was named as the president of the South Pasadena Junior High School Teachers' Association. He remained with the school until his retirement in 1956.

In 1932, Douthirt saved a three-family apartment from burning down. He almost lost his finger while breaking the window into the apartment.

Upon retiring, Douthirt worked on his ranch in Hemet, California, where he lived until his death on August 19, 1981 in Loma Linda, California.

== Head coaching record ==
=== College football ===
Year	Team	Overall	Conference	Standing	Bowl/playoffs
Central Dutch (Iowa Conference) (1927)
1927	Central	1–7	1–6	12th	
Central:		1–7	1–6		
Total:		1–7			
