= John Dorman =

John Dorman may refer to:

- John J. Dorman, Fire Commissioner of the City of New York
- John Henry Dorman (1843–1921), American Civil War soldier and Medal of Honor recipient
- John "Doc" Dorman (died 1963), American football coach
