= 1974 Central Dutch football team =

American college football season

1974 Central Dutch football

NCAA Division III champion Iowa Conference champion

Stagg Bowl, W 10–8 vs. Ithaca
- Conference: Iowa Conference
- Record: 11–0 (7–0 Iowa)
- Head coach: Ron Schipper (11th season)

1974 Iowa Conference football standings
	Conf.					Overall
Team	W		L		T	W		L		T
Central (IA) $^	7	–	0	–	0	11	–	0	–	0
No. 8 William Penn	6	–	1	–	0	9	–	2	–	0
Buena Vista	4	–	3	–	0	5	–	4	–	0
Upper Iowa	4	–	3	–	0	4	–	5	–	0
Luther	3	–	4	–	0	3	–	6	–	0
Simpson (IA)	2	–	5	–	0	2	–	6	–	1
Dubuque	1	–	6	–	0	4	–	7	–	0
Wartburg	1	–	6	–	0	2	–	8	–	0
$ – Conference champion; ^ – NCAA Division III playoff participant; Rankings from NAIA Division II poll

The 1974 Central Dutch football team was an American football team that represented Central College as a member of the Iowa Conference during the 1974 NCAA Division III football season. In their 11th season under head coach Ron Schipper, the Dutch compiled an 11–0 record and won both the Iowa Conference championship and the NCAA Division III national championship.

The team participated in the second annual NCAA Division III playoff, defeating Evansville (17–16) in the semifinal and Ithaca (10–8) in the Amos Alonzo Stagg Bowl championship game.

Linebacker Al Dorenkamp led a defense that allowed an average of only 6.9 points per game and was selected as the most valuable player in the IIAC. Eight Central players received first-team honors on the All-IIAC team: Dorenkamp; offensive linemen Don Knock and Dan Wright; wide receiver Randy Busscher; running back Mike Hodges; quarterback Gary Cutler; defensive lineman Ron Merema; and defensive back Cliff Marlow.

Quarterback Cutler completed 69 of 126 passes for 1,236 yards and 16 touchdowns. His 1974 pass efficiency rating of 174.3 remains a single-season school record (minimum 100 attempts). Receiver Busscher set a single-game school record with 259 receiving yards in the victory over Ferris State.

Coach Schipper was honored as the 1974 IIAC Coach of the Year. He was inducted in the College Football Hall of Fame in 2000.

The team played its home games at in Pella, Iowa.

== Schedule ==
Date	Opponent	Site	Result	Attendance	Source
September 14	Northwestern (IA)*	Pella, IA	W 19–0		
September 21	Ferris State*	Pella, IA	W 22–17		
September 28	at Wartburg	Waverly, IA	W 16–0		
October 5	at Dubuque^{†}	Dubuque, IA	W 36–22		
October 12	Luther	Pella, IA	W 27–0		
October 19	at Buena Vista	Storm Lake, IA	W 13–9		
October 26	Simpson	Pella, IA	W 28–0		
November 2	at Upper Iowa	Fayette, IA	W 44–0		
November 9	William Penn	Pella, IA	W 23–14		
November 30	at Evansville*	Evansville, IN (NCAA Division III semifinal)	W 17–16		
December 7	vs. Ithaca*	Phenix City, AL (Stagg Bowl—NCAA Division III championship game)	W 10–8		
*Non-conference game; ^{†}Homecoming

== See also ==
- Video highlights of the 1974 Stagg Bowl published by Central College
