= Rich Kacmarynski =

American football coach (born 1969 or 1970)

Current position
- Title: Head coach
- Team: Pella Christian HS (IA)
- Record: 122–61

Biographical details
- Born: c. 1969 or 1970 (age 56–57)
- Education: Central College (1992); Iowa State University (2003)

Playing career
- 1988–1991: Central (IA)
- Position: Fullback

Coaching career (HC unless noted)
- 1992–1996: Central (IA) (assistant)
- 1997–2003: Central (IA)
- 2004–2005: Pella Christian HS (IA) (assistant)
- 2006–2007: UNC Pembroke (OC)
- 2008–present: Pella Christian HS (IA)

Head coaching record
- Overall: 63–15 (college); 122–61 (high school)
- Tournaments: 3–4 (NCAA D-III playoffs)

Accomplishments and honors

Championships
- 4 Iowa (1998, 2000–2002)

Awards
- 3× All-Iowa (1989–1991)

Richard Kacmarynski (born 1969 or 1970) is an American college football coach. He is the head football coach for Pella Christian High School, a position he has held since 2008. He was the head football coach for Central College from 1997 to 2003. He also coached for UNC Pembroke. He played college football for Central (IA) as a fullback.

Kacmarynski also served as the chair of the NCAA Student-Athlete Advisory Committee.

== Head coaching record ==
=== College ===
| Year | Team | Overall | Conference | Standing | Bowl/playoffs |
|---|---|---|---|---|---|
Central Dutch (Iowa Conference) (1997–2003)
| 1997 | Central | 8–2 | 7–1 | 2nd | |
| 1998 | Central | 10–1 | 10–0 | 1st | L NCAA Division III Regional |
| 1999 | Central | 10–2 | 9–1 | 2nd | L NCAA Division III Second Round |
| 2000 | Central | 12–1 | 10–0 | 1st | L NCAA Division III Quarterfinal |
| 2001 | Central | 9–2 | 8–1 | 1st | L NCAA Division III Second Round |
| 2002 | Central | 8–2 | 8–1 | T–1st | |
| 2003 | Central | 5–5 | 3–5 | T–6th | |
| Central: | | 63–15 | 55–10 | | |
| Total: | | 63–15 | | | |
National championship Conference title Conference division title or championship game berth

=== High school ===
| Year | Team | Overall | Conference | Standing | Bowl/playoffs |
|---|---|---|---|---|---|
Pella Christian Eagles () (2008–present)
| 2008 | Pella Christian | 10–2 | 7–0 | 1st | |
| 2009 | Pella Christian | 7–3 | 5–1 | 1st | |
| 2010 | Pella Christian | 9–2 | 6–0 | 1st | |
| 2011 | Pella Christian | 6–3 | 5–1 | 2nd | |
| 2012 | Pella Christian | 6–4 | 3–3 | 4th | |
| 2013 | Pella Christian | 3–7 | 2–4 | 4th | |
| 2014 | Pella Christian | 7–4 | 4–2 | 3rd | |
| 2015 | Pella Christian | 7–4 | 4–2 | 3rd | |
| 2016 | Pella Christian | 11–2 | 8–0 | 1st | |
| 2017 | Pella Christian | 11–1 | 8–0 | 1st | |
| 2018 | Pella Christian | 8–4 | 4–1 | 2nd | |
| 2019 | Pella Christian | 5–5 | 5–0 | 1st | |
| 2020 | Pella Christian | 5–4 | 3–1 | 2nd | |
| 2021 | Pella Christian | 8–2 | 4–1 | 2nd | |
| 2022 | Pella Christian | 9–3 | 4–1 | 2nd | |
| 2023 | Pella Christian | 7–4 | 4–1 | 2nd | |
| 2024 | Pella Christian | 3–7 | 3–3 | 3rd | |
| 2025 | Pella Christian | 0–0 | 0–0 | | |
| Pella Christian: | | 122–61 | 79–21 | | |
| Total: | | 122–61 | | | |
National championship Conference title Conference division title or championship game berth
