= Scot Dapp =

American football and baseball coach (born 1951)

Biographical details
- Born: September 27, 1951

Coaching career (HC unless noted)

Football
- 1987–2010: Moravian

Baseball
- 1980–1985: Susquehanna

Head coaching record
- Overall: 144–103–1 (football); 74–66 (baseball)
- Bowls: 2–3
- Tournaments: Football; 1–2 (NCAA D-III playoffs)

Accomplishments and honors

Championships
- Football; 1 Middle Atlantic (1987); 1 MAC Commonwealth (1993)

Scot Dapp (born September 27, 1951) is an American former football and baseball coach. He served as the head football coach at Moravian College in Bethlehem, Pennsylvania from 1987 to 2010, compiling a record of 144–103–1. Dapp was also the head baseball coach at Susquehanna University in Selinsgrove, Pennsylvania from 1980 to 1985, tallying a mark of 74–66. He was the president of the American Football Coaches Association in 2005.

Dapp is a 1973 graduate of West Chester University. He earned a master's degree from the University of North Carolina at Chapel Hill.

Prior to coming to Moravian he was an assistant coach at Kutztown University of Pennsylvania, Delaware State College, and Susquehanna.

Dapp was MAC Commonwealth League Coach-of-the-Year three times.

== Head coaching record ==
=== Football ===
Year	Team	Overall	Conference	Standing	Bowl/playoffs
Moravian Greyhounds (Middle Atlantic Conference) (1987–2006)
1987	Moravian	6–4	6–3	T–4th	
1988	Moravian	10–2	7–1	T–1st	L NCAA Division III Quarterfinal
1989	Moravian	8–2	6–2	T–3rd	
1990	Moravian	6–4	4–4	5th	
1991	Moravian	7–3	5–3	T–3rd	
1992	Moravian	6–4	4–4	4th	
1993	Moravian	8–3	4–1	1st (Commonwealth)	L NCAA Division III Quarterfinal
1994	Moravian	6–4	3–2	T–2nd (Commonwealth)	
1995	Moravian	7–2–1	2–2–1	3rd (Commonwealth)	
1996	Moravian	6–4	2–3	4th (Commonwealth)	
1997	Moravian	7–3	4–1	2nd (Commonwealth)	
1998	Moravian	3–7	2–3	T–4th (Commonwealth)	
1999	Moravian	2–8	1–4	6th (Commonwealth)	
2000	Moravian	6–4	3–2	2nd (Commonwealth)	
2001	Moravian	5–5	3–5	8th	
2002	Moravian	7–4	7–2	3rd	L ECAC Southeast Bowl
2003	Moravian	3–7	3–6	T–8th	
2004	Moravian	7–4	7–2	2nd	L ECAC Southwest Bowl
2005	Moravian	7–4	5–4	T–4th	W ECAC Southwest Bowl
2006	Moravian	4–6	4–5	T–6th	
Moravian Greyhounds (Centennial Conference) (2007–2010)
2007	Moravian	6–4	4–4	T–5th	
2008	Moravian	8–3	6–2	T–2nd	L ECAC Southwest Bowl
2009	Moravian	2–8	2–6	T–7th	
2010	Moravian	7–4	6–3	4th	W ECAC Southeast Bowl
Moravian:		144–103–1	100–74–1		
Total:		144–103–1			
