= 1961 Parsons Wildcats football team =

American college football season

1961 Parsons Wildcats football

Iowa Conference champion

Mineral Water Bowl, L 8–22 vs. Northeast Missouri State
- Conference: Iowa Conference
- Record: 9–1 (8–0 Iowa)
- Head coach: Gary Nady (3rd season)

1961 Iowa Conference football standings
	Conf.					Overall
Team	W		L		T	W		L		T
No. 12 Parsons $	8	–	0	–	0	9	–	0	–	0
Luther	6	–	2	–	0	6	–	3	–	0
Central (IA)	5	–	3	–	0	6	–	3	–	0
Upper Iowa	5	–	3	–	0	6	–	3	–	0
Dubuque	4	–	4	–	0	5	–	4	–	0
Buena Vista	3	–	5	–	0	4	–	5	–	0
Iowa Wesleyan	3	–	5	–	0	3	–	7	–	0
Wartburg	2	–	6	–	0	2	–	7	–	0
Simpson (IA)	0	–	8	–	0	1	–	8	–	0
$ – Conference champion; Rankings from NAIA poll

The 1961 Parsons Wildcats football team was an American football team that represented Parsons College of Fairfield, Iowa, as a member of the Iowa Conference during the 1961 college football season. In their third and final year under head coach Gary Nady, the Wildcats compiled a 9–1 record (8–0 against conference opponents), won the Iowa Conference championship, lost to Northeast Missouri State in the Mineral Water Bowl, and outscored opponents by a total of 259 to 50. Parson was ranked 12th in the final National Association of Intercollegiate Athletics (NAIA) poll.

== Schedule ==
Date	Opponent	Site	Result	Attendance	Source
September 16	Upper Iowa	Fairfield, IA	W 30–0		
September 23	at Buena Vista	Storm Lake, IA	W 33–0		
September 30	at Wartburg	Waverly, IA	W 16–7		
October 7	Iowa Wesleyan	Fairfield, IA	W 27–0		
October 14	at Dubuque	Dubuque, IA	W 6–2		
October 21	Central (IA)	Fairfied, IA	W 12–0		
October 28	Simpson	Fairfield, IA	W 55–0		
November 4	at Luther	Decorah, IA	W 39–19		
November 11	at Hastings*	Hastings, NE	W 33–0		
November 25	vs. Northeast Missouri State*	Excelsior Springs High School Stadium; Excelsior Springs, MO	L 8–22 (Mineral Water Bowl)	5,000	
*Non-conference game
