= Ennio Arboit =

American football player

Biographical details
- Born: November 21, 1916
- Died: September 11, 1954 (aged 37); Long Beach, California, U.S.

Playing career

Football
- 1936–1937: Notre Dame

Baseball
- 1939: Norfolk Tars
- Position: Pitcher

Coaching career (HC unless noted)

Football
- 1946: St. Ambrose
- 1952–1953: St. Anthony HS (CA)

Head coaching record
- Overall: 5–3 (college)

Accomplishments and honors

Awards
- Best All-Around Italian-American Athlete, 1937–1938

Ennio B. Arboit (November 21, 1916 – September 11, 1954) was an American football and baseball player and coach. He played college football at the University of Notre Dame. He served as the head football coach at St. Ambrose University in Davenport, Iowa in 1946 before becoming the head coach at St. Anthony High School in Long Beach, California. He died in 1954.

== Head coaching record ==
=== Football ===
Year	Team	Overall	Conference	Standing	Bowl/playoffs
St. Ambrose Fighting Bees (Iowa Conference) (1946)
1946	St. Ambrose	5–3	1–0	3rd	
St. Ambrose:		5–3	1–0		
Total:		5–3			
