= Ron Schipper =

American football coach and college athletics administrator

Biographical details
- Born: August 7, 1928; Zeeland, Michigan, U.S.
- Died: March 27, 2006 (aged 77); Holland, Michigan, U.S.

Coaching career (HC unless noted)
- 1952–1959: Northville HS (MI)
- 1960: Jackson HS (MI)
- 1961–1996: Central (IA)

Administrative career (AD unless noted)
- 1964–1993: Central (IA)

Head coaching record
- Overall: 287–67–3 (college)
- Tournaments: 16–11 (NCAA D-III playoffs); 0–1 (NAIA playoffs)

Accomplishments and honors

Championships
- 1 NCAA Division III (1974); 18 Iowa Conference (1964–1967, 1974, 1977–1978, 1981, 1983–1987, 1989–1990, 1992, 1994–1995)

Awards
- Amos Alonzo Stagg Award (2004); 11× Iowa Conference Coach of the Year (1974, 1977–1978, 1981, 1983–1985, 1989–1990, 1994–1995)
- College Football Hall of Fame; Inducted in 2000 (profile)

Ronald Maurice "Skip" Schipper (August 7, 1928 – March 27, 2006) was an American football coach and college athletics administrator. He served as the head football coach at Central College in Pella, Iowa from 1961 to 1996, compiling a record of 287–67–3. His 1974 Central Dutch football team won an NCAA Division III football championship. Schipper was inducted into the College Football Hall of Fame in 2000.

== Career ==
Schipper coached high school football for Northville High School in Northville, Michigan from 1952 to 1959 and at Jackson High School in Jackson, Michigan in 1960.

Schipper served as the head football coach at Central College in Pella, Iowa from 1961 to 1996, compiling a record of 287–67–3. He was also the school's athletic director from 1964 to 1993. During his tenure as head football coach at Central College, he always had a winning season. His teams won 18 Iowa Conference championships, enjoyed ten undefeated regular seasons, and won the 1974 NCAA Division III Football Championship; they were national runners-up in 1984 and 1988.

Schipper's 287 career wins rank third in among NCAA Division III football coaches, behind John Gagliardi's 489 and Larry Kehres's 332. He retired with an .808 career winning percentage—then the fourth highest in NCAA Division III history. Schipper was inducted into the College Football Hall of Fame in 2000 and received the Amos Alonzo Stagg Award, presented by the American Football Coaches Association, in 2004.

== Personal life ==
Schipper was born in Zeeland, Michigan. He died in Holland, Michigan, at age 77. He was survived by his wife, Joyce, daughter Sara, and two sons Tim and Thom, grandchildren Nathan, Rachel, Alaina, Elsje and Lukas.

== Head coaching record ==
=== College ===
Year	Team	Overall	Conference	Standing	Bowl/playoffs
Central Dutch (Iowa Conference) (1961–1996)
1961	Central	6–3	5–3	T–3rd	
1962	Central	7–2	7–2	2nd	
1963	Central	7–1–1	6–1–1	2nd	
1964	Central	8–1	7–1	T–1st	
1965	Central	8–1	7–0	1st	
1966	Central	9–1	7–0	1st	L NAIA Semifinal
1967	Central	9–0	7–0	1st	
1968	Central	5–3–1	3–3–1	4th	
1969	Central	6–3	5–2	T–2nd	
1970	Central	6–2	5–2	T–2nd	
1971	Central	6–3	4–3	4th	
1972	Central	6–3	5–2	3rd	
1973	Central	7–2	6–1	2nd	
1974	Central	11–0	7–0	1st	W NCAA Division III Championship
1975	Central	5–4	4–3	T–3rd	
1976	Central	7–2	5–2	3rd	
1977	Central	9–1	7–0	1st	L NCAA Division III Quarterfinal
1978	Central	5–4	5–2	T–1st	
1979	Central	6–3	5–2	3rd	
1980	Central	5–4	5–2	T–2nd	
1981	Central	6–2–1	6–1	1st	
1982	Central	8–2	6–1	2nd	
1983	Central	7–2	6–1	T–1st	
1984	Central	11–1	7–0	1st	L NCAA Division III Championship
1985	Central	11–1	7–0	1st	L NCAA Division III Semifinal
1986	Central	11–1	8–0	1st	L NCAA Division III Quarterfinal
1987	Central	11–2	7–1	1st	L NCAA Division III Semifinal
1988	Central	11–2	7–1	2nd	L NCAA Division III Championship
1989	Central	10–1	8–0	1st	L NCAA Division III Quarterfinal
1990	Central	10–2	8–0	1st	L NCAA Division III Semifinal
1991	Central	8–1	7–1	2nd	
1992	Central	10–1	8–0	1st	L NCAA Division III Quarterfinal
1993	Central	8–1	7–1	2nd	
1994	Central	10–1	8–0	1st	L NCAA Division III First Round
1995	Central	10–1	8–0	1st	L NCAA Division III First Round
1996	Central	7–3	7–1	2nd	
Central:		287–67–3	227–39–2		
Total:		287–67–3			
National championship Conference title Conference division title or championship game berth

== See also ==
- List of college football career coaching wins leaders
- List of presidents of the American Football Coaches Association
