= 1998 Mount Union Purple Raiders football team =

American college football season

1998 Mount Union Purple Raiders football

NCAA Division III champion OAC champion

Stagg Bowl, W 44–24 vs. Rowan
- Conference: Ohio Athletic Conference
- Record: 14–0 (9–0 OAC)
- Head coach: Larry Kehres (13th season)
- Home stadium: Mount Union Stadium

1998 Ohio Athletic Conference football standings
	Conf.			Overall
Team	W		L	W		L
Mount Union $^	9	–	0	14	–	0
Baldwin–Wallace	8	–	1	8	–	2
John Carroll	7	–	2	8	–	2
Ohio Northern	6	–	3	7	–	3
Marietta	5	–	4	6	–	4
Muskingum	4	–	5	5	–	5
Otterbein	3	–	6	4	–	6
Heidelberg	2	–	7	2	–	8
Hiram	1	–	8	2	–	8
Capital	0	–	9	1	–	9
$ – Conference champion; ^ – NCAA Division III playoff participant

The 1998 Mount Union Purple Raiders football team was an American football team that represented the University of Mount Union in the Ohio Athletic Conference (OAC) during the 1998 NCAA Division III football season. In their 13th year under head coach Larry Kehres, the Purple Raiders compiled a perfect 14–0 record, won the OAC championship, and outscored opponents by a total of 523 to 227. They qualified for the NCAA Division III playoffs and advanced to the national championship team, defeating Rowan, 44–24.

Mount Union's 1997 season was part of a record 54-game winning streak that spanned four seasons, commencing on September 14, 1996 and continuing through December 6, 1998. The national championship was the third in three years and the fourth in six years.

Quarterback Gary Smeck and receiver Adam Marino led the team on offense.

The team played its home games at Mount Union Stadium in Alliance, Ohio.

== Schedule ==
Date	Opponent	Site	Result	Attendance	Source
September 12	at Albion*	Sprankle-Sprandel Stadium; Albion, MI	W 38–24	3,419	
September 19	Hiram	Mount Union Stadium; Alliance, OH	W 58–0		
September 26	at Ohio Northern	Ada, OH	W 42–37	3,313	
October 3	John Carroll	Mount Union Stadium; Alliance, OH	W 21–14		
October 10	Heidelberg	Mount Union Stadium; Alliance, OH	W 40–17	3,626	
October 17	at Otterbein	Westerville, OH	W 38–7		
October 24	Marietta	Mount Union Stadium; Alliance, OH	W 41–6	2,963	
October 31	Capital	Bemlohr Stadium; Bexley, OH	W 58–7	1,031	
November 7	Muskingum	Mount Union Stadium; Alliance, OH	W 37–3	2,236	
November 14	at Baldwin–Wallace	Finnie Stadium; Berea, OH	W 30–21	10,000	
November 21	Albion*	Mount Union Stadium; Alliance, OH (NCAA Division III first round)	W 21–19	2,416	
November 28	Wittenberg*	Mount Union Stadium; Alliance, OH (NCAA Division III quarterfinal)	W 21–19	5,069	
December 5	Trinity (TX)*	Mount Union Stadium; Alliance, OH (NCAA Division III semifinal)	W 34–29	5,013	
December 12	vs. Rowan*	Salem Football Stadium; Salem, VA (Stagg Bowl)	W 44–24	5,145	
*Non-conference game
