= Robert Bungum =

American football player and coach (1910–1976)

Biographical details
- Born: December 24, 1910; Hayfield, Minnesota, U.S.
- Died: December 25, 1976 (aged 66); Forest City, Iowa, U.S.
- Education: Luther College (IA)

Coaching career (HC unless noted)
- 1946–1949: Luther
- 1953–1967: Waldorf

Head coaching record
- Overall: 9–23–2 (college)

Robert Morris Bungum (December 24, 1910 – December 25, 1976) was an American football coach. He served as the head football coach at Luther College in Decorah, Iowa from 1946 to 1949 after serving a brief stint as a coach in the Ames, Iowa public school system.

== Head coaching record ==
=== College ===
Year	Team	Overall	Conference	Standing	Bowl/playoffs
Luther Norse (Iowa Conference) (1946–1949)
1946	Luther	3–6	3–2	6th	
1947	Luther	1–7–1	0–5–1	11th	
1948	Luther	3–5	3–2	5th	
1949	Luther	2–5–1	1–3	T–8th	
Luther:		9–23–2	7–12–1		
Total:		9–23–2			
