= Stanley Hall (coach) =

American football and basketball coach (1914–1990)

Biographical details
- Born: March 9, 1914; Cumberland, Ohio, U.S.
- Died: February 14, 1990 (aged 75)
- Education: Maryville

Coaching career (HC unless noted)

Football
- 1946: Wartburg
- 1954–1955: Northern Iowa (assistant)

Basketball
- 1946–1947: Wartburg
- 1948–1954: Bemidji State
- 1954–1956: Northern Iowa

Head coaching record
- Overall: 2–5 (football); 132–68 (basketball)

Stanley H. Hall (March 9, 1914 - February 14, 1990) was an American football and basketball coach. He served as the head football at Wartburg College in Waverly, Iowa in 1946. Additionally, he served as Wartburg's head men's basketball coach from 1946–47. Hall served as the head men's basketball coach at Bemidji State University from 1948 to 1954 before moving into the same role at the University of Northern Iowa in Cedar Falls, Iowa from 1954 to 1956.

== Head coaching record ==
=== Football ===
Year	Team	Overall	Conference	Standing	Bowl/playoffs
Wartburg Knights (Iowa Conference) (1946)
1946	Wartburg	2–5	1–5	10th	
Wartburg:		2–5	1–5		
Total:		2–5			
