= Olan Ruble =

American athletics coach and administrator (1906–1982)

Biographical details
- Born: February 17, 1906; Clinton, Iowa, U.S.
- Died: November 11, 1982 (aged 76); Wheaton, Illinois, U.S.

Playing career

Football
- 1924–1927: Simpson (IA)

Basketball
- 1924–1928: Simpson (IA)

Coaching career (HC unless noted)

Football
- 1942–1948: Iowa Wesleyan

Basketball
- 1930: Mingo HS (IA)
- 1941–1947: Iowa Wesleyan

Baseball
- 1943–1949: Iowa Wesleyan

Administrative career (AD unless noted)
- 1941–1949: Iowa Wesleyan

Head coaching record
- Overall: 15–23–1 (college football); 39–60 (college basketball)

Olan Guy Ruble (February 17, 1906 – November 11, 1982) was an American football, basketball, and baseball coach and college athletics administrator. He served as the head football coach at Iowa Wesleyan College from 1942 to 1948. Ruble was also the head basketball coach at Iowa Wesleyan from 1941 to 1947 and the school's head baseball coach from 1943 to 1949.

== Head coaching record ==
=== College football ===
Year	Team	Overall	Conference	Standing	Bowl/playoffs
Iowa Wesleyan Tigers (Iowa Conference) (1942–1948)
1942	Iowa Wesleyan	1–6	1–4	T–11th	
1943	No team—World War II				
1944	Iowa Wesleyan	2–0			
1945	Iowa Wesleyan	3–2	1–0	2nd	
1946	Iowa Wesleyan	3–6	1–4	T–8th	
1947	Iowa Wesleyan	5–3–1	3–2–1	T–7th	
1948	Iowa Wesleyan	1–6	1–5	T–8th	
Iowa Wesleyan:		15–23–1	7–15–1		
Total:		15–23–1			
