= Roland Ortmayer =

American football player and coach (1917–2008)

Biographical details
- Born: August 22, 1917; College Park, Maryland, U.S.
- Died: October 8, 2008 (aged 91)

Playing career

Football
- 1937: Northwestern
- Position: Halfback

Coaching career (HC unless noted)

Football
- 1940: Highland Park HS (IL)
- 1941: Dobyns-Bennett HS (TN) (assistant)
- 1946–1947: William Penn
- 1948–1990: La Verne

Basketball
- 1946–1948: William Penn

Baseball
- 1946–1948: William Penn

Head coaching record
- Overall: 182–209–8 (college football); 7–31 (college basketball); 5–20 (college baseball)

Accomplishments and honors

Championships
- Football; 2 SCIAC (1975, 1982)

Roland J. Ortmayer (August 22, 1917 – October 8, 2008) was an American football player and coach. He served as the head football coach at William Penn University in Oskaloosa, Iowa from 1946 to 1947 and the University of La Verne in La Verne, California from 1948 to 1990. Ortmayer was noted for his unorthodox approach to the sport of football. He held non-mandatory practices and did not require offseason weight training for his players. When he retired, his career record of 182–209–8 gave him the most losses of any college football coach in history. His record for career losses was surpassed by Watson Brown, who retired with 211 losses in 2015.

Ortmayer taught and coached at Highland Park High School in Highland Park, Illinois before he was hired, in 1941, as an assistant coach at Dobyns-Bennett High School in Kingsport, Tennessee.

== Head coaching record ==
=== College football ===
Year	Team	Overall	Conference	Standing	Bowl/playoffs
William Penn Quakers (Iowa Conference) (1946–1947)
1946	William Penn	0–6	0–4	13th	
1947	William Penn	0–8	0–6	13th	
William Penn:		0–14	0–10		
La Verne Leopards (NAIA Division II independent) (1948–1970)
1948	La Verne	3–5			
1949	La Verne	5–3–2			
1950	La Verne	3–5			
1951	La Verne	5–3			
1952	La Verne	5–3–1			
1953	La Verne	3–7			
1954	La Verne	2–6			
1955	La Verne	5–4			
1956	La Verne	3–6			
1957	La Verne	3–7–1			
1958	La Verne	5–3–1			
1959	La Verne	3–6			
1960	La Verne	4–5			
1961	La Verne	7–2			
1962	La Verne	6–2			
1963	La Verne	3–5			
1964	La Verne	5–4			
1965	La Verne	5–3			
1966	La Verne	3–6			
1967	La Verne	6–3			
1968	La Verne	7–2			
1969	La Verne	5–4			
1970	La Verne	5–4			
La Verne Leopards (Southern California Intercollegiate Athletic Conference) (1971–1990)
1971	La Verne	1–6–1	1–3	5th	
1972	La Verne	6–3	3–2	3rd	
1973	La Verne	4–5	3–2	T–2nd	
1974	La Verne	5–5	3–2	3rd	
1975	La Verne	6–3–1	4–0–1	T–1st	
1976	La Verne	5–4	3–2	T–2nd	
1977	La Verne	4–5	2–3	4th	
1978	La Verne	1–7	1–4	5th	
1979	La Verne	4–5	2–3	T–4th	
1980	La Verne	2–8	1–4	5th	
1981	La Verne	2–7	1–4	T–4th	
1982	La Verne	8–1	4–1	1st	
1983	La Verne	3–5	2–3	T–3rd	
1984	La Verne	6–3	2–1–2 (Note: From 1984 to 1990, the Southern California Intercollegiate Athletic Conference (SCIAC) football schedule included multiple head-to-head meetings each season. In 1984 and 1985, each conference member played two other conference members twice. From 1986 to 1990, each conference member played one other conference member twice. A head-to-head sweep of the two games in one season counted as one win for the winner and one loss for the loser in the conference standings. A split of the two games counted as a tie for each team.)	3rd	
1985	La Verne	4–5	2–3	4th	
1986	La Verne	6–3	3–1–1	T–2nd	
1987	La Verne	3–6	2–2–1	3rd	
1988	La Verne	3–6	2–3	4th	
1989	La Verne	4–5	3–1–1	T–2nd	
1990	La Verne	4–5	2–2–1	3rd	
La Verne:		182–195–8	46–46–7		
Total:		182–209–8			
National championship Conference title Conference division title or championship game berth

== See also ==
- List of college football coaches with 100 losses
