= KCUI =

- Pella, Iowa; United States
- Frequency: 89.1 MHz

Ownership
- Owner: Central College (Iowa); (Central College)

History
- Call sign meaning: Central University of Iowa

Technical information
- Facility ID: 9984
- Class: D
- ERP: 10 watts
- HAAT: 56 meters (184 ft)

KCUI (89.1 FM) was a radio station that served the Central College and Pella, Iowa communities. The station primarily broadcast a "block format," with student-DJs choosing their preferred genre. KCUI was licensed to Central University of Iowa, later renamed Central College.

The KCUI studios were located above the Mills Art Gallery in the IBS building for much of its life; toward the end, KCUI was housed in the then recently finished basement of the Maytag Student Center on Central College's campus.

The station's license was cancelled by the Federal Communications Commission on December 6, 2011. This followed a $7,000 fine from the FCC imposed in 2007 for late filing of the station's 2004 license renewal.

Sunday programming on KCUI was, mostly to all, reserved for religious programming under a longstanding agreement with local churches. The scheduling and staffing for Sunday religious programming was managed by local Pella churches. Local churches helped start KCUI with Central College. The churches paid for much of the original audio equipment.
