= Jann Freed =

Academic background
- Education: Central College (BA); Drake University (MBA); Iowa State University (PhD)

Academic work
- Discipline: Business management scholar
- Sub-discipline: Educational management
- Institutions: Central College

Jann E. Freed is professor emeritus of business management and is the Mark and Kay DeCook Endowed Chair in Leadership and Character Development at Central College in Pella, Iowa, where she had a 30-year career. Freed is the author of several books and articles on continuous improvement in higher education and one book on learner-centered assessment on college campuses. Freed is also a researcher and author, and focuses on the skills of effective leaders. She has been largely collected by libraries worldwide.

== Early life and education ==
Freed completed a Bachelor of Arts in Business Management, from Central College in Pella, Iowa, in 1977. She earned an Master of Business Administration from Drake University, Des Moines, Iowa, in 1981 and received her Ph.D. in Higher Education Administration with a concentration in Research and Evaluation from Iowa State University, Ames, Iowa, in 1987.

== Career ==
Freed had a 30-year career (1981–2011) at Central College located in Pella, Iowa. Freed was promoted to Full Professor in 1998. She developed and designed teaching methodologies at the college level for management and marketing courses including Organizational Behavior, Organizational Leadership, Strategic Management, and Marketing. Freed was elected and appointed to administrative roles including: Academic Quality Improvement Program (AQIP) Coordinator; Interim Vice-President of Academic Affairs; Division Chair of Behavioral Sciences; and Department Chair of Economics, Accounting, and Business Management.

Freed held the position of chair of Newcomer's Program Association for the Study of Higher Education. She was a member of the executive committee of the Midwest Business Administration Association International, and acted as its president in 2011. She was a member of the advisory council of the North America Management Society, and served a term as its President, receiving a Leadership Award in 2011.

Freed has co-authored four books and many articles about continuous improvement and the skills of effective leaders. She writes regularly for the Des Moines Business Record on leadership and related topics and was a TEDxDesMoines Speaker in 2013.

In 2014 Freed is a Certified Change Management Consultant with the Genysys Group in Des Moines, Iowa. In this position she works with organizations and their leaders to initiate long-term change.

== Books ==
- Leading With Wisdom: Sage Advice From 100 Experts was published by ASTD (August 16, 2013).
- Women of Yucatan: Thirty Who Dare To Change Their World, was co-authored with George Ann Huck and published by McFarland (December 4, 2009).
- Learner-Centered Assessment on Campus: Shifting the Focus from Teaching to Learning, Mary E. Huba and published by Pearson; 1 edition (December 13, 1999)
- Quality Principles and Practices in Higher Education: Different Questions for Different Times, co-authored with Marie Klugman is part of the American Council on Education/Oryx Press Series on Higher Ed and published by Oryx Press (October 6, 1997).
- A Culture for Academic Excellence: Implementing the Quality Principles in Higher Education, co-authored with Marie Klugman and Jonathon D. Fife and published by Jossey-Bass; 1 edition (April 13, 1996).

== Journal articles ==
- "Creating a Total Quality Environment for Learning" (TQE) Journal of Management Education
- "Effective Leaders Create Healthy Work Environments". Public Manager 43.2 (Summer 2014): 21–25.
- "In Search of Wisdom from Leadership Sages"]. Interbeing. 5.2 (Fall 2011): 1–8.
- "Why Become a Learning Organization?", About Campus

== Awards ==
Freed was a recipient of the Virgil S. Lagomarcino Laureate Award from Iowa State University College of Human Sciences in 2008, and the Hutch Bearce Leadership and Community Building Award from Central College in 2009. She was presented with the Louise Noun Visionary Award from the Young Women's Resource Center of Des Moines, Iowa in 2014.
