= 1961 Northeast Missouri State Bulldogs football team =

American college football season

1961 Northeast Missouri State Bulldogs football

MIAA champion

Mineral Water Bowl, W 22–8 vs. Parsons
- Conference: Missouri Intercollegiate Athletic Association
- Record: 9–1 (5–0 MIAA)
- Head coach: Maurice Wade (11th season)
- Home stadium: Stokes Stadium

1961 Missouri Intercollegiate Athletic Association football standings
	Conf.					Overall
Team	W		L		T	W		L		T
NE Missouri State $	5	–	0	–	0	9	–	1	–	0
SE Missouri State	3	–	2	–	0	5	–	5	–	0
Missouri–Rolla	3	–	2	–	0	4	–	5	–	0
SW Missouri State	2	–	3	–	0	4	–	4	–	1
Central Missouri State	2	–	3	–	0	3	–	5	–	0
NW Missouri State	0	–	5	–	0	2	–	7	–	0
$ – Conference champion

The 1961 Northeast Missouri State Bulldogs football team was an American football team that represented Northeast Missouri State Teachers College (now known as Truman State University) as a member of the Missouri Intercollegiate Athletic Association (MIAA) during the 1961 college football season. In their 11th year under head coach Maurice Wade, the Bulldogs compiled a 9–1 record (5–0 in conference games), won the MIAA championship, and outscored opponents by a total of 218 to 86.

The team tallied 2,954 yards of total offense (328 yards per game), consisting of 1,989 rushing yards (221 yards per game) and 965 passing yards (107 yards per game). On defense, the Bulldogs gave up 1,740 yards (193 yards per game) with 1,147 rushing yards (127 yards per game) and 593 passing yards (65.77 yards per game).

Quarterback Jack Ball, a 197-pound junior, led the team with 965 passing yards and 978 yards of total offense. He was also one of the leading vote recipients on the 1961 All-MIAA football team. Other statistical leaders included: halfback Ted Michael with 735 rushing yards; end Randy Jones with 18 receptions for 318 yards; and fullback Joe Minton with 55 points scored on seven touchdowns, 10 extra points, and a field goal.

In addition to Ball, four other Northeast Missouri State players received first-team honors on the 1961 All-MIAA football team: end Milton Pike; tackle David Grant; guard Ronald Stark; and center Pat Claywell. Four others received second-team honors: backs Joseph Minton and Ted Michael; end Allen Church; and tackle Fred Lyles.

The team played its home games at Stokes Stadium in Kirksville, Missouri.

== Schedule ==
Date	Opponent	Site	Result	Attendance	Source
September 16	at William Jewell*	Liberty, MO	W 19–0	5,000	
September 22	at Washburn*	Topeka, KS	W 27–9	4,200	
September 29	Northern Illinois*	Stokes Stadium; Kirksville, MO	W 28–13	2,300–4,100	
October 7	at Central State (OH)*	Wilberforce, OH	L 14–21	3,750	
October 14	at Southeast Missouri State	Cape Girardeau, MO	W 26–7	8,000	
October 21	Northwest Missouri State	Kirksville, MO	W 36–7	2,400	
October 28	at Southwest Missouri State	SMS Stadium; Springfield, MO	W 12–7	5,500–7,000	
November 3	Central Missouri State	Kirksville, MO	W 14–7	3,750	
November 10	Missouri–Rolla	Kirksville, MO	W 20–7	3,100	
November 25	vs. Parsons*	Excelsior Springs High School Stadium; Excelsior, MO (Mineral Water Bowl)	W 22–8	5,000	
*Non-conference game
