= Len Winter =

American athletics coach (1902–1952)

Biographical details
- Born: February 26, 1902; Hinton, Iowa, U.S.
- Died: May 19, 1952 (aged 50); Chicago, Illinois, U.S.

Playing career

Football
- 1921–1924: Grinnell

Basketball
- 1921–1924: Grinnell

Track and field
- 1921–1924: Grinnell
- Positions: End (football); Guard (basketball); 440-yard dash, long jump (track and field)

Coaching career (HC unless noted)

Football
- 1926–1927: Wilton Junction HS (IA)
- 1928–1937: Central (IA)
- 1938–1940: Columbia (IA) / Loras

Basketball
- 1926–1927: Wilton Junction HS (IA)
- 1928–1937: Central (IA)

Track and field
- 1926–1927: Wilton Junction HS (IA)
- 1928–1937: Central (IA)
- 1938–1940: Columbia (IA) / Loras

Head coaching record
- Overall: 46–57–8 (college football); 83–59 (college basketball)

Accomplishments and honors

Championships
- Basketball; 4 Iowa Conference (1929–1931, 1935)

Leonard Alvern Winter (February 26, 1902 – May 19, 1952) was an American college football, basketball, and track and field coach. He was the head football, basketball, and track and field coach for Wilton Junction High School from 1926 to 1927 and for Central College from 1928 to 1937. He was the head football coach and head of track and field for Loras College from 1938 to 1940.

== Early life and playing career ==
Winter was born on February 26, 1902, to Dietrich Philip Winter and Estella May Hancer in Hinton, Iowa. He was one of seven children. His father was born in Meyenburg, Germany, and immigrated to the United States in 1883 when he was 32 years old. Dietrich worked as the postmaster for Hinton, Iowa, and was a member of the board of education for the Hinton school system. Len's mother was from Iowa, where she lived her entire life. His maternal grandfather, Frederick George Hancer, was born in Suffolk, England, and migrated to New York City in 1866.

Winter attended Central High School in Sioux City, Iowa.

Winter participated in football, basketball, and track while attending Grinnell College. For the Pioneers football team he served as an end. For the basketball team he served as a guard. In track, he participated in both the 440-yard dash and the long jump.

== Coaching career ==
Winter began his coaching career as the head football, basketball, and track coach for Wilton Junction High School in Wilton, Iowa. He served in those roles for two years before moving to the collegiate level.

In 1928, Winter was hired as the head football, basketball, and track coach for Central College in Pella, Iowa. In ten years as the Dutch football coach he led the team to a 34–44–6 record. His best seasons came from 1930 to 1932 when the team went 17–5–2 and finished as high as third in the Iowa Conference. As basketball coach, he led the team to an overall record of 83–59 and four Iowa Conference championships: 1929 through 1931 and 1935. He was best known for his "point-a-minute" championship teams which three-peated from 1929 to 1931 and culminated a 45–3 record, including a 39-game win streak, in a three-year span. He resigned from all coaching positions following the 1937 season to enter a private business in Kentucky.

In 1938, not long after leaving coaching, Winter returned as he was hired as the head football and track coach for Columbia College—which was renamed Loras College in 1939—as the successor to John Niemiec. In three seasons as head football coach, he led the team to a 12–13–2 record. His 6–2–2 record in his last season was the best record since Eddie Anderson coached the team in the 1920s. He resigned following the 1940 season.

In 1940, Winter was among the top candidates for the head football coach position for St. Ambrose, but ultimately was not hired.

== Personal life and later career ==
Winter met his wife, Ruth Eleanor Somers, while they attended Grinnell College. They married in Grinnell, Iowa, in 1927. They had two daughters who were born in 1929 and 1936, respectively.

While coaching with Loras, Winter served as the director of physical education.

In 1940, Winter was arrested for speeding and driving without a license.

After Winter's coaching career ended he worked as an auditor for the Congress Plaza Hotel in Chicago.

Winter died of pneumonia on May 19, 1952, in Chicago. He was buried in his home state in Sioux City, Iowa.

== Head coaching record ==
=== College football ===
Year	Team	Overall	Conference	Standing	Bowl/playoffs
Central Dutch (Iowa Conference) (1928–1937)
1928	Central	0–8	0–8	14th	
1929	Central	3–4–1	2–4	8th	
1930	Central	6–2	3–2	8th	
1931	Central	5–1–2	3–1–2	4th	
1932	Central	6–2	5–2	3rd	
1933	Central	2–6–1	1–5–1	13th	
1934	Central	1–6–1	1–6–1	14th	
1935	Central	4–5	3–3	9th	
1936	Central	4–5	4–3	6th	
1937	Central	3–5–1	3–2–1	T–6th	
Central:		34–44–6	25–36–5		
Columbia / Loras Duhawks (Iowa Conference) (1938–1940)
1938	Columbia	2–6	2–4	T–10th	
1939	Loras	4–5	4–3	7th	
1940	Loras	6–2–2	4–1–1	3rd	
Columbia / Loras:		12–13–2	10–8–1		
Total:		46–57–8			

=== College basketball ===
Record table
Season	Team	Overall	Conference	Standing	Postseason
Central Dutch (Iowa Conference) (1928–1937)
1928–29	Central	7–9		10th	
1929–30	Central	14–1		1st	
1930–31	Central	16–0		1st	
1931–32	Central	15–2		1st	
1932–33	Central	2–10		12th	
1933–34	Central	3–11		13th	
1934–35	Central	9–9		5th	
1935–36	Central	12–5		1st	
1936–37	Central	5–12	5–12	11th	
Central:		83–59			
Total:		83–59			
National champion Postseason invitational champion Conference regular season champion Conference regular season and conference tournament champion Division regular season champion Division regular season and conference tournament champion Conference tournament champion
