= Jeff McMartin =

American football coach (born 1967)

Current position
- Title: Head coach
- Team: Central (IA)
- Conference: ARC
- Record: 177–56

Biographical details
- Born: November 21, 1967 (age 58)
- Education: Central (IA); Wake Forest

Coaching career (HC unless noted)

Football
- 1990–1991: Wake Forest (GA)
- 1992–1993: Illinois Wesleyan (DL)
- 1994: Rochester (NY) (DL)
- 1995–1999: Beloit (OL/ST)
- 2000–2003: DePauw (OC/OL)
- 2004–present: Central (IA)

Track and field
- 1994: Illinois Wesleyan (asst. / interim HC)
- 1994–1995: Rochester (NY) (assistant)
- 1995–2000: Beloit
- 2000–2003: DePauw (assistant)

Administrative career (AD unless noted)
- 2024: AFCA (president)

Head coaching record
- Overall: 177–56 (football)
- Tournaments: 5–6 (NCAA D-III playoffs)

Accomplishments and honors

Championships
- Football; 6 IIAC/ARC (2005–2007, 2009, 2019, 2021)

Awards
- 5× IIAC/ARC Coach of the Year (2005–2007, 2019, 2021)

Jeff McMartin (born November 21, 1967) is an American college football and track and field coach. He is the head football coach for Central College, a position he has held since 2004. McMartin was the head men's and women's track and field coach at Beloit College from 1995 to 2000.

In 2024, McMartin was voted as the president of the American Football Coaches Association (AFCA).

== Head coaching record ==
=== Football ===
Year	Team	Overall	Conference	Standing	Bowl/playoffs	D3^{#}
Central Dutch (Iowa Conference / Iowa Intercollegiate Athletic Conference / American Rivers Conference) (2004–present)
2004	Central	6–4	5–3	T–3rd		
2005	Central	9–2	7–1	T–1st	L NCAA Division III First Round	20
2006	Central	10–1	8–0	1st	L NCAA Division III First Round	11
2007	Central	12–1	8–0	1st	L NCAA Division III Quarterfinal	6
2008	Central	6–4	4–4	T–5th		
2009	Central	10–1	8–0	1st	L NCAA Division III First Round	8
2010	Central	8–2	6–2	3rd		
2011	Central	7–3	6–2	T–2nd		
2012	Central	5–5	4–3	T–2nd		
2013	Central	6–4	4–3	T–3rd		
2014	Central	8–2	6–1	2nd		
2015	Central	6–4	4–3	3rd		
2016	Central	8–2	6–2	T–2nd		
2017	Central	7–3	6–2	2nd		
2018	Central	8–2	6–2	T–2nd		
2019	Central	10–2	7–1	T–1st	L NCAA Division III Second Round	17
2020–21	Central	2–0	2–0	N/A		
2021	Central	12–1	8–0	1st	L NCAA Division III Quarterfinal	10
2022	Central	7–3	5–3	T–4th		
2023	Central	8–2	6–2	3rd		
2024	Central	8–2	6–2	3rd		
2025	Central	8–2	6–2	3rd		
2026	Central	6–4	4–3	4th		
Central:		177–56	132–41			
Total:		177–56				
National championship Conference title Conference division title or championship game berth

== See also ==
- List of current NCAA Division III football coaches
