= Richard Tysseling =

American athlete, coach, and administrator (1910–1997)

Biographical details
- Born: December 26, 1910; Pella, Iowa, U.S.
- Died: September 3, 1997 (aged 86); Pella, Iowa, U.S.

Playing career

Football
- 1928–1931: Central (IA)

Basketball
- 1928–1932: Central (IA)

Baseball
- 1929–1932: Central (IA)

Track and field
- 1928–1932: Central (IA)
- Positions: End, quarterback (football); Guard (basketball); Second baseman (baseball); Sprint, pole vault (track and field)

Coaching career (HC unless noted)

Football
- 1932–1936: Garden Grove HS (IA)
- 1937: Shenandoah HS (IA) (assistant)
- 1938–1942: Central (IA)
- 1946–1960: Central (IA)

Basketball
- 1937–1938: Shenandoah HS (IA) (assistant)
- 1938–1948: Central (IA)

Baseball
- 1941: Central (IA)
- 1946: Central (IA)

Administrative career (AD unless noted)
- 1938–1964: Central (IA)

Head coaching record
- Overall: 79–84–7 (football); 84–79 (basketball); 3–7 (baseball)

Accomplishments and honors

Championships
- Football; 3 Iowa Conference (1939, 1946, 1956)

Richard Albertus "Babe" Tysseling (December 26, 1910 – September 3, 1997) was an American football, basketball, and baseball player, coach, and college athletics administrator. He served as the head football coach at Central College in Pella, Iowa from 1938 to 1942 and from 1946 to 1960, compiling a record of 79–84–7.

Tysseling attended Central College, where lettered four times each in football, basketball, baseball, and track. He played as an end and quarterback in football, a guard in basketball and a second baseman in baseball. In track he competed as a sprinter and pole vaulter. After graduating from Central in 1932, Tysseling coached high school for give years in Garden Grove, Iowa. In 1937, he was hired as an assistant coach in football and basketball at Shenandoah High School in Shenandoah, Iowa.

Tysseling died in September 3, 1997, at Pella Community Hospital, following a long illness.

== Head coaching record ==
=== Football ===
Year	Team	Overall	Conference	Standing	Bowl/playoffs
Central Dutch (Iowa Conference) (1938–1942)
1938	Central	2–6	2–4	T–9th	
1939	Central	7–2	5–2	T–1st	
1940	Central	6–3	5–3	5th	
1941	Central	6–3	6–2	4th	
1942	Central	3–4–1	2–3–1	8th	
Central Dutch (Iowa Conference) (1946–1960)
1946	Central	7–1	6–0	T–1st	
1947	Central	7–1–1	5–0–1	4th	
1948	Central	5–2–1	3–2	T–4th	
1949	Central	4–4–1	3–1	3rd	
1950	Central	2–7	1–4	T–4th (Southern)	
1951	Central	3–6	1–4	T–5th (Southern)	
1952	Central	1–7	0–4	5th (Southern)	
1953	Central	4–3–1	3–1	2nd (Southern)	
1954	Central	3–5	1–5	7th	
1955	Central	3–5	1–5	T–8th	
1956	Central	7–1	7–1	1st	
1957	Central	3–4–1	2–4–1	7th	
1958	Central	0–8–1	0–7–1	9th	
1959	Central	3–6	2–6	7th	
1960	Central	3–6	3–5	T–6th	
Central:		79–84–7	58–63–4		
Total:		79–84–7			
National championship Conference title Conference division title or championship game berth
