= National Italian-American Civic League =

The National Italian-American Civic League was an Italian American fraternal organization.

== Athletic awards ==
The Civic League sponsored a number of annual athletic awards, including a trophy for the national championship in college football and a list of Outstanding Italian American Athletes.

=== National championship trophy ===
Season	Team	Head coach	Record
1935	Minnesota	Bernie Bierman	8–0
1936	Minnesota	Bernie Bierman	7–1
