= 1998 NCAA Division III football season =

American college football season

- Regular season: August – November 1998
- Playoffs: November – December 1998
- National championship: Salem Football Stadium; Salem, VA
- Champion: Mount Union (4)
- Gagliardi Trophy: Scott Hvistendahl (WR, P), Augsburg

The 1998 NCAA Division III football season, part of the college football season organized by the NCAA at the Division III level in the United States, began in August 1998, and concluded with the NCAA Division III Football Championship, also known as the Stagg Bowl, in December 1998 at Salem Football Stadium in Salem, Virginia. The Mount Union Purple Raiders won their fourth, and third consecutive, Division III championship by defeating the Rowan Profs, 44−24.

The Gagliardi Trophy, given to the most outstanding player in Division III football, was awarded to Scott Hvistendahl, wide receiver and punter from Augsburg.

== Conference standings ==
1998 American Southwest Conference football standings
	Conf.			Overall
Team	W		L	W		L
Hardin–Simmons $	7	–	0	9	–	1
McMurry	6	–	1	8	–	2
Howard Payne	5	–	2	8	–	2
Austin	4	–	3	4	–	6
Mississippi College	2	–	5	4	–	6
Texas Lutheran	2	–	5	4	–	6
Mary Hardin–Baylor	2	–	5	3	–	7
Sul Ross	0	–	7	1	–	9
$ – Conference champion

1998 Atlantic Central Football Conference standings
	Conf.			Overall
Team	W		L	W		L
Wesley $	3	–	0	7	–	3
Methodist	3	–	1	7	–	3
Frostburg State	2	–	2	7	–	3
Chowan	2	–	3	5	–	5
Ferrum	2	–	3	6	–	4
Salisbury State	1	–	4	3	–	7
$ – Conference champion

1998 Centennial Conference football standings
	Conf.			Overall
Team	W		L	W		L
Western Maryland $^	7	–	0	10	–	2
Dickinson	5	–	2	8	–	3
Johns Hopkins	5	–	2	7	–	3
Franklin & Marshall	4	–	3	4	–	6
Muhlenberg	3	–	4	5	–	5
Gettysburg	2	–	5	3	–	7
Ursinus	2	–	5	3	–	7
Swarthmore	0	–	7	0	–	8
$ – Conference champion; ^ – NCAA Division III playoff participant

1998 College Conference of Illinois and Wisconsin football standings
	Conf.			Overall
Team	W		L	W		L
Millikin $^	6	–	1	8	–	2
Augustana (IL)	5	–	2	7	–	2
Illinois Wesleyan	5	–	2	7	–	2
Wheaton (IL)	5	–	2	6	–	3
Carthage	4	–	3	5	–	4
Elmhurst	1	–	6	3	–	6
North Central (IL)	1	–	6	3	–	6
North Park	1	–	6	2	–	7
$ – Conference champion; ^ – NCAA Division III playoff participant

1998 Freedom Football Conference standings
	Conf.			Overall
Team	W		L	W		L
Springfield (MA) $^	6	–	0	9	–	2
Plymouth State	4	–	2	7	–	4
Merchant Marine	4	–	2	6	–	3
Western Connecticut	3	–	3	5	–	5
WPI	3	–	3	4	–	5
Norwich	1	–	5	5	–	6
Coast Guard	0	–	6	1	–	8
$ – Conference champion; ^ – NCAA Division III playoff participant

1998 Heartland Collegiate Athletic Conference football standings
	Conf.			Overall
Team	W		L	W		L
Wabash $	7	–	0	9	–	1
Hanover	6	–	1	9	–	1
Franklin (IN)	4	–	3	6	–	4
Bluffton	4	–	3	5	–	5
Wilmington (OH)	3	–	4	4	–	6
Manchester	2	–	5	2	–	8
Mount St. Joseph	2	–	5	2	–	8
Anderson (IN)	0	–	7	0	–	10
$ – Conference champion

1998 Illini–Badger Football Conference standings
	Conf.			Overall
Team	W		L	W		L
Aurora $	7	–	0	7	–	3
MacMurray	6	–	1	9	–	1
Concordia (WI)	5	–	2	7	–	3
Lakeland	4	–	3	7	–	3
Benedictine (IL)	3	–	4	3	–	7
Eureka	2	–	5	4	–	6
Greenville	1	–	6	2	–	8
Concordia (IL)	0	–	7	1	–	9
$ – Conference champion

1998 Iowa Conference football standings
	Conf.			Overall
Team	W		L	W		L
Central (IA) $^	10	–	0	10	–	1
Wartburg	9	–	1	9	–	1
Buena Vista	7	–	3	7	–	3
Simpson (IA)	7	–	3	7	–	3
Coe	5	–	5	5	–	5
Upper Iowa	5	–	5	5	–	5
Cornell (IA)	4	–	6	4	–	6
Loras	4	–	6	4	–	6
Luther	3	–	7	3	–	7
William Penn	1	–	9	1	–	9
Dubuque	0	–	10	0	–	10
$ – Conference champion; ^ – NCAA Division III playoff participant

1998 Michigan Intercollegiate Athletic Association football standings
	Conf.			Overall
Team	W		L	W		L
Albion $^	6	–	0	8	–	2
Hope	4	–	2	5	–	4
Adrian	3	–	3	5	–	4
Alma	3	–	3	5	–	4
Olivet	2	–	4	5	–	4
Kalamazoo	2	–	4	4	–	5
Defiance	1	–	5	3	–	6
$ – Conference champion; ^ – NCAA Division III playoff participant

1998 Middle Atlantic Conference football standings
	Conf.			Overall
Team	W		L	W		L
Commonwealth
Widener x	4	–	1	8	–	2
Susquehanna x	4	–	1	6	–	3
Juniata	3	–	2	5	–	5
Albright	2	–	3	4	–	6
Moravian	2	–	3	3	–	7
Lebanon Valley	0	–	5	1	–	9
Freedom
Lycoming x^	4	–	0	10	–	1
Wilkes	3	–	1	5	–	4
King's (PA)	2	–	2	3	–	7
Fairleigh Dickinson–Florham	1	–	3	2	–	8
Delaware Valley	0	–	4	3	–	7
x – Division champion/co-champions; ^ – NCAA Division III playoff participant

1998 Midwest Conference football standings
	Conf.			Overall
Team	W		L	W		L
Grinnell $	9	–	0	10	–	0
Beloit	7	–	2	7	–	3
Ripon	7	–	2	7	–	3
Knox	6	–	3	6	–	4
St. Norbert	5	–	4	5	–	5
Lake Forest	4	–	5	4	–	6
Carroll (WI)	3	–	6	4	–	6
Lawrence	2	–	7	2	–	8
Monmouth (IL)	2	–	7	2	–	8
Illinois College	0	–	9	0	–	10
$ – Conference champion

1998 Minnesota Intercollegiate Athletic Conference football standings
	Conf.					Overall
Team	W		L		T	W		L		T
Saint John's (MN) $^	9	–	0	–	0	11	–	1	–	0
Bethel (MN)	7	–	2	–	0	8	–	2	–	0
Gustavus Adolphus	7	–	2	–	0	8	–	2	–	0
St. Thomas (MN)	7	–	2	–	0	7	–	3	–	0
Augsburg	5	–	4	–	0	6	–	4	–	0
Concordia–Moorhead	4	–	5	–	0	4	–	6	–	0
Hamline	2	–	7	–	0	2	–	8	–	0
St. Olaf	2	–	7	–	0	2	–	8	–	0
Carleton	1	–	8	–	0	2	–	8	–	0
Macalester	1	–	8	–	0	2	–	8	–	0
$ – Conference champion; ^ – NCAA Division III playoff participant

1998 New England Football Conference standings
	Conf.			Overall
Team	W		L	W		L
Blue Division
Salve Regina x	6	–	0	10	–	1
UMass Dartmouth	5	–	1	8	–	2
Curry	4	–	2	6	–	4
Western New England	3	–	3	5	–	4
Nichols	2	–	4	5	–	5
MIT	1	–	5	1	–	8
UMass–Boston	0	–	6	0	–	10
Red Division
Bridgewater State x	5	–	1	7	–	3
Maine Maritime x	5	–	1	5	–	5
Massachusetts Maritime	4	–	2	6	–	4
Worcester State	3	–	3	4	–	6
Westfield State	2	–	4	5	–	5
Fitchburg State	2	–	4	3	–	7
Framingham State	0	–	6	2	–	8
x – Division champion/co-champions

1998 New England Small College Athletic Conference football standings
	Conf.			Overall
Team	W		L	W		L
Williams	8	–	0	8	–	0
Tufts	7	–	1	7	–	1
Wesleyan	6	–	2	6	–	2
Amherst	5	–	3	5	–	3
Bowdoin	5	–	3	5	–	3
Middlebury	3	–	5	3	–	5
Trinity (CT)	2	–	6	2	–	6
Colby	2	–	6	2	–	6
Bates	1	–	7	1	–	7
Hamilton	1	–	7	1	–	7
No conference champion recognized

1998 New Jersey Athletic Conference football standings
	Conf.			Overall
Team	W		L	W		L
TCNJ $^	5	–	0	8	–	3
Rowan ^	4	–	1	10	–	3
Montclair State	3	–	2	8	–	3
New Jersey City	2	–	3	6	–	4
Kean	1	–	4	1	–	9
William Paterson	0	–	5	0	–	10
$ – Conference champion; ^ – NCAA Division III playoff participant

1998 North Coast Athletic Conference football standings
	Conf.			Overall
Team	W		L	W		L
Wittenberg $^	8	–	0	11	–	1
Allegheny	6	–	1	8	–	2
Wooster	6	–	2	8	–	2
Case Western Reserve	4	–	2	5	–	5
Ohio Wesleyan	4	–	4	6	–	4
Kenyon	2	–	5	4	–	6
Denison	2	–	6	3	–	7
Earlham	2	–	6	2	–	8
Oberlin	0	–	8	0	–	10
$ – Conference champion; ^ – NCAA Division III playoff participant

1998 Northwest Conference football standings
	Conf.			Overall
Team	W		L	W		L
Pacific Lutheran $^	5	–	0	8	–	2
Linfield	4	–	1	7	–	2
Willamette	3	–	2	7	–	3
Whitworth	2	–	3	5	–	5
Puget Sound	1	–	4	2	–	8
Lewis & Clark	0	–	5	1	–	7
$ – Conference champion; ^ – NCAA Division III playoff participant

1998 Ohio Athletic Conference football standings
	Conf.			Overall
Team	W		L	W		L
Mount Union $^	9	–	0	14	–	0
Baldwin–Wallace	8	–	1	8	–	2
John Carroll	7	–	2	8	–	2
Ohio Northern	6	–	3	7	–	3
Marietta	5	–	4	6	–	4
Muskingum	4	–	5	5	–	5
Otterbein	3	–	6	4	–	6
Heidelberg	2	–	7	2	–	8
Hiram	1	–	8	2	–	8
Capital	0	–	9	1	–	9
$ – Conference champion; ^ – NCAA Division III playoff participant

1998 Old Dominion Athletic Conference football standings
	Conf.			Overall
Team	W		L	W		L
Emory & Henry $	5	–	0	10	–	0
Randolph–Macon	4	–	1	7	–	3
Guilford	3	–	2	4	–	6
Hampden–Sydney	2	–	3	3	–	7
Washington and Lee	1	–	4	4	–	6
Bridgewater	0	–	5	0	–	10
$ – Conference champion; ^ – NCAA Division III playoff participant

1998 Presidents' Athletic Conference football standings
	Conf.			Overall
Team	W		L	W		L
Washington & Jefferson +	3	–	1	5	–	4
Waynesburg +	3	–	1	5	–	4
Grove City +	3	–	1	5	–	5
Bethany (WV)	1	–	3	2	–	8
Thiel	0	–	4	1	–	9
+ – Conference co-champions

1998 Southern California Intercollegiate Athletic Conference football standings
	Conf.					Overall
Team	W		L		T	W		L		T
Whittier $		5	–	0			7	–	2
Redlands		4	–	1			7	–	2
Cal Lutheran		2	–	3			5	–	4
La Verne		2	–	3			4	–	5
Claremont-Mudd		1	–	4			2	–	7
Occidental		1	–	4			1	–	8
$ – Conference champion

1998 Southern Collegiate Athletic Conference football standings
	Conf.			Overall
Team	W		L	W		L
Trinity (TX) $^	6	–	0	12	–	1
DePauw	5	–	1	7	–	3
Rhodes	4	–	2	5	–	5
Centre	3	–	3	3	–	7
Rose–Hulman	2	–	4	3	–	7
Sewanee	1	–	5	2	–	7
Millsaps	0	–	6	3	–	7
$ – Conference champion; ^ – NCAA Division III playoff participant

1998 St. Louis Intercollegiate Athletic Conference football standings
	Conf.			Overall
Team	W		L	W		L
MacMurray $	4	–	0	9	–	1
Westminster (MO)	3	–	1	9	–	1
Blackburn	2	–	2	4	–	5
Greenville	1	–	3	2	–	8
Principia	0	–	4	0	–	8
$ – Conference champion

1998 Upstate Collegiate Athletic Association football standings
	Conf.			Overall
Team	W		L	W		L
RPI +	3	–	1	7	–	2
Hobart +	3	–	1	6	–	3
Union (NY)	2	–	2	6	–	3
Rochester (NY)	1	–	3	1	–	8
St. Lawrence	1	–	3	1	–	8
+ – Conference co-champions

1998 Wisconsin Intercollegiate Athletic Conference football standings
	Conf.			Overall
Team	W		L	W		L
Wisconsin–Stevens Point +	5	–	2	7	–	2
Wisconsin–Whitewater +	5	–	2	7	–	2
Wisconsin–Eau Claire +^	5	–	2	10	–	3
Wisconsin–River Falls +	5	–	2	7	–	3
Wisconsin–La Crosse	4	–	3	4	–	5
Wisconsin–Stout	3	–	4	5	–	5
Wisconsin–Oshkosh	2	–	6	4	–	6
Wisconsin–Platteville	0	–	7	1	–	9
+ – Conference co-champions; ^ – NCAA Division III playoff participant

1998 NCAA Division III independents football records
	Conf.			Overall
Team	W		L	W		L
Catholic University ^		–		10	–	1
Ithaca		–		9	–	2
Hartwick		–		9	–	2
Buffalo State ^		–		9	–	3
Pomona-Pitzer		–		6	–	2
Maranatha Baptist		–		6	–	4
Alfred		–		5	–	4
Maryville (TN)		–		4	–	6
Cortland		–		4	–	6
Brockport		–		3	–	6
Colorado College		–		3	–	6
Thomas More		–		3	–	7
Chapman		–		2	–	7
St. John Fisher		–		2	–	7
Menlo		–		2	–	8
^ – NCAA Division III playoff participant

== Conference champions ==
Conference champions
- American Southwest Conference – Hardin–Simmons
- Centennial Conference – Western Maryland
- College Conference of Illinois and Wisconsin – Millikin
- Freedom Football Conference – Springfield
- Heartland Collegiate Athletic Conference – Wabash
- Illini-Badger Football Conference – Aurora
- Iowa Intercollegiate Athletic Conference – Central (IA)
- Michigan Intercollegiate Athletic Association – Albion
- Middle Atlantic Conference – Lycoming
- Midwest Conference – Grinnell
- Minnesota Intercollegiate Athletic Conference – Saint John's (MN)
- New England Football Conference – Salve Regina (Blue Division), Bridgewater State (Red Division)
- New Jersey Athletic Conference – TCNJ
- North Coast Athletic Conference – Wittenberg
- Northwest Conference – Pacific Lutheran
- Ohio Athletic Conference – Mount Union
- Old Dominion Athletic Conference – Emory & Henry
- Presidents' Athletic Conference – Grove City, Washington & Jefferson, and Waynesburg
- Southern California Intercollegiate Athletic Conference – Whittier
- Southern Collegiate Athletic Conference – Trinity (TX)
- University Athletic Association – Chicago
- Upper Midwest Athletic Conference – Maranatha Baptist, Martin Luther, and Mount Senario
- Upstate Collegiate Athletic Conference – RPI
- Wisconsin Intercollegiate Athletic Conference – Wisconsin–Eau Claire, Wisconsin–River Falls, Wisconsin–Stevens Point, and Wisconsin–Whitewater

== Postseason ==
The 1998 NCAA Division III Football Championship playoffs were the 26th annual single-elimination tournament to determine the national champion of men's NCAA Division III college football. The championship Stagg Bowl game was held at Salem Football Stadium in Salem, Virginia for the second time. As of 2014, Salem has remained the yearly host of the Stagg Bowl. This was the final bracket to feature sixteen teams before expanding to 28 teams in 1999.

=== Playoff bracket ===
Regionals; Campus Sites
Mount Union	21
Albion	19
Wittenberg	13
Millikin	10
Lycoming	49
Catholic University	14
Trinity (TX)	30
Western Maryland	20
Wisconsin–Eau Claire	28
Central (IA)	21
Saint John's (MN)	33
Pacific Lutheran	20
Buffalo State	38
Springfield	35
Rowan	26
TCNJ	2

Quarterfinals; Campus Sites
Mount Union	21
Wittenberg	19
Lycoming	21
Trinity (TX)	37
Wisconsin–Eau Claire	10
Saint John's (MN)	3
Buffalo State	17
Rowan	19

Semifinals; Campus Sites
Mount Union	34
Trinity (TX)	29
Wisconsin–Eau Claire	19
Rowan	22

National Championship Game; Salem Football Stadium; Salem, Virginia
Mount Union	44
Rowan	24

== Final NCAA Regional Poll ==
=== East Region ===
Team	Record
1. Springfield(Mass.)	9–0
2. Ithaca	8–1
3. New Jersey	7–2
4. Rowan	6–2
5. Buffalo State	7–2
6. Montclair State	7–2

Others receiving votes (listed alphabetically): Hartwick, Hobart, Rensselaer Polytechnic, and Salve Regina.

=== South Region ===
Team	Record
1. Lycoming	9–0
2. Trinity(TX)	9–0
3. Western Maryland	9–0
4. Catholic	9–0
5. Emory and Henry	9–0
6. Hardin-Simmons	8–1

Others receiving votes: McMurry, Pomona-Pitzer, Westminster, and Widener.

=== North Region ===
Team	Record
1. Mt. Union	9–0
2. Wittenberg	9–0
3. Wabash	9–0
4. Baldwin-Wallace	8–1
5. Albion	8–1
6. Millikin	7–1

Others receiving votes: Allegheny, Hanover, John Carroll, and MacMurray.

=== West Region ===
Team	Record
1. Central(IA)	9–0
2. St. John's	9–0
3. Pacific Lutheran	7–1
4. Wisconsin-Eau Claire	7–2
5. Gustavus Adolphus	8–1
6. Wisconsin-Stevens Point	6–2

Others receiving votes: Grinnell, Linfield, Wartburg, and Wisconsin-Whitewater.

*This was the final time the NCAA conducted a regional poll for Division III, starting with the 1999 season, American Football Coaches Association conducted a top 25 coaches poll.

== Awards ==
Gagliardi Trophy: Scott Hvistendahl, Augsburg

AFCA Coach of the Year: Larry Kehres, Mount Union

AFCA Regional Coach of the Year: Region 1: Mike DeLong, Springfield Region 2: Frank Girardi, Lycoming Region 3: Steve Mohr, Trinity(TX) Region 4: Joe Fincham, Wittenberg Region 5: Rich Kacmarynski, Central(IA)

== See also ==
- 1998 NCAA Division I-A football season
- 1998 NCAA Division I-AA football season
- 1998 NCAA Division II football season
