= Baptist Convention of Iowa =

The Baptist Convention of Iowa is a group of churches affiliated with the Southern Baptist Convention located in the U.S. state of Iowa. Headquartered in Des Moines, it is made up of about 110 churches and five Baptist associations.

== History ==
It was founded as the Baptist General Convention on June 4, 1842, changed to the Baptist Convention of Iowa, and finally to the present moniker on the 10th anniversary. The Baptist Convention of Iowa prospered in the late 19th and early 20th centuries. They operated Des Moines University until the national body took over in 1927, leading to financial difficulties during the Dust Bowl and incipient Great Depression, which came early to the Plains States. Des Moines University closed in 1929, but instead of the financial crisis, the administration blamed court-ordered actions arising from previous student riots at the school.

== Associations ==
- Great Rivers
- Metro
- Northeast
- Northwest
- Southwest
