= John "Doc" Dorman =

American football and basketball coach

Biographical details
- Born: c. 1878
- Died: February 2, 1963 (aged 84)
- Education: Upper Iowa

Coaching career (HC unless noted)

Football
- 1910–1959: Upper Iowa

Basketball
- 1915–1936: Upper Iowa

Head coaching record
- Overall: 159–138–18 (football); 87–123 (basketball)

Accomplishments and honors

Championships
- Football; 6 Iowa Conference (1925, 1937, 1939, 1946–1948)

Awards
- DM Register Hall of Fame; FWAA Hall of Fame (1955); UIU Hall of Fame (1980)

John Edward "Doc" Dorman (c. 1878 – February 2, 1963) was an American college football and college basketball coach. He was the head football coach at Upper Iowa University in Fayette, Iowa from roughly 1905 until his retirement in 1959.

Dorman graduated from Upper Iowa in 1900. During his years as a student at UIU, he played football, basketball and baseball. Upon graduation from UIU, he entered Georgetown University where he received his DDS. While there, he played baseball, receiving offers from several major leagues; but he chose to return to Fayette where he went into his father's dental office. In the spring of 1907, he began a coaching career at UIU that lasted over 50 years.

In 1955, Dr. Dorman received an achievement award from the Football Writers Association of America. The following year he was named to the Helms Athletic Foundation Hall of Fame. He was the first small-college coach to be honored by either group.
