= Central Dutch football =

College football team

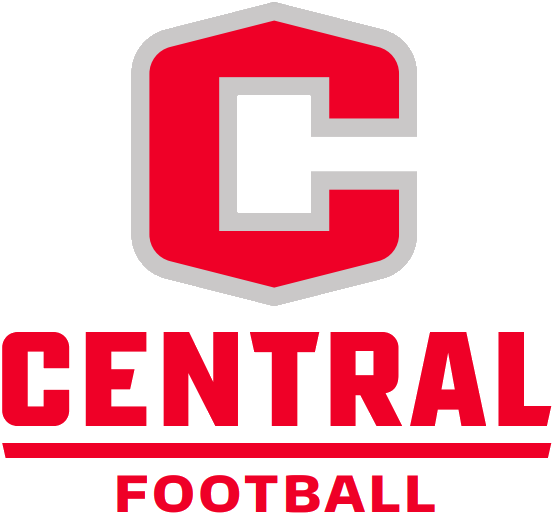
- First season: 1892; 134 years ago
- Athletic director: Eric Van Kley
- Head coach: Jeff McMartin; 22nd season, 171–52 (.767)
- Location: Pella, Iowa
- Stadium: Ron and Joyce Schipper Stadium (capacity: 1,000)
- NCAA division: Division III
- Conference: ARC
- Colors: Red and white
- All-time record: 676–340–26 (.661)

NCAA Division III championships
- 1974

Conference championships
- 32
- Rivalries: Simpson
- Mascot: Dutch
- Website: central.edu/football

The Central Dutch football team represents Central College in college football at the NCAA Division III level. The Dutch are members of the American Rivers Conference (ARC), fielding its team in the ARC since 1923 when it was named the Iowa Intercollegiate Athletic Conference (IIAC). The Dutch play their home games at Ron and Joyce Schipper Stadium in Pella, Iowa. The stadium was known as Kuyper Stadium from 1977 to 2005.

Their head coach is Jeff McMartin, who took over the position for the 2004 season.

== Conference affiliations ==
- Unknown (1892–1893; 1903–1905; 1909–1916; 1920–1922)
- Iowa Intercollegiate Athletic Conference (1923–2017; rebranded)
- American Rivers Conference (2018–present)

== Championships ==
=== Conference championships ===
Central claims 32 conference titles, the most recent of which came in 2021.

Year	Conference	Overall Record	Conference Record	Coach
1939†	Iowa Conference	7–2	5–2	Richard Tysseling
1946†	Iowa Conference	7–1	6–0	Richard Tysseling
1956	Iowa Conference	7–1	7–1	Richard Tysseling
1964†	Iowa Conference	8–1	7–1	Ron Schipper
1965	Iowa Conference	8–1	7–0	Ron Schipper
1966	Iowa Conference	9–1	7–0	Ron Schipper
1967	Iowa Conference	9–0	7–0	Ron Schipper
1974	Iowa Conference	11–0	7–0	Ron Schipper
1977	Iowa Conference	9–1	7–0	Ron Schipper
1978†	Iowa Conference	5–4	5–2	Ron Schipper
1981	Iowa Conference	6–2–1	6–1	Ron Schipper
1983†	Iowa Conference	7–2	6–1	Ron Schipper
1984	Iowa Conference	11–1	7–0	Ron Schipper
1985	Iowa Conference	11–1	7–0	Ron Schipper
1986	Iowa Conference	11–1	8–0	Ron Schipper
1987	Iowa Conference	11–2	7–1	Ron Schipper
1989	Iowa Conference	10–1	8–0	Ron Schipper
1990	Iowa Conference	10–2	8–0	Ron Schipper
1992	Iowa Conference	10–1	8–0	Ron Schipper
1994	Iowa Conference	10–1	8–0	Ron Schipper
1995	Iowa Conference	10–1	8–0	Ron Schipper
1998	Iowa Conference	10–1	10–0	Rich Kacmarynski
2000	Iowa Conference	12–1	10–0	Rich Kacmarynski
2001	Iowa Conference	9–2	8–1	Rich Kacmarynski
2002†	Iowa Conference	8–2	8–1	Rich Kacmarynski
2005†	Iowa Conference	9–2	7–1	Jeff McMartin
2006	Iowa Conference	10–1	8–0	Jeff McMartin
2007	Iowa Intercollegiate Athletic Conference	12–1	8–0	Jeff McMartin
2009	Iowa Intercollegiate Athletic Conference	10–1	8–0	Jeff McMartin
2019†	American Rivers Conference	10–2	7–1	Jeff McMartin
2021	American Rivers Conference	12–1	8–0	Jeff McMartin

† Co-champions

== Postseason games ==
=== NAIA playoffs ===
The Dutch have made one appearance in the NAIA playoffs, with a combined record of 0–1.

Season	Coach	Playoff	Opponent	Result
1966	Ron Schipper	Semifinals	Whitewater State	L 18–41

=== NCAA Division III playoff games ===
The Dutch have made twenty-two appearances in the Division III playoffs with an overall record of 24–21. They finished as national champions in the NCAA Division III Championship Game (Stagg Bowl) in 1974, and as national runner-ups in 1984 and 1988.

Season	Coach	Playoff	Opponent	Result
1974	Ron Schipper	Semifinals; Stagg Bowl	Evansville; Ithaca	W 17–16; W 10–8
1977	Ron Schipper	Semifinals	Widener	L 0–19
1984	Ron Schipper	Quarterfinals; Semifinals; Stagg Bowl	Occidental; Washington & Jefferson; Augustana (IL)	W 23–22; W 20–0; L 12–21
1985	Ron Schipper	First round Quarterfinals; Semifinals	Coe; Occidental; Augustana (IL)	W 27–7; W 71–0; L 7–14
1986	Ron Schipper	First round Quarterfinals	Buena Vista; Concordia–Moorhead	W 37–0; L 14–17
1987	Ron Schipper	First round Quarterfinals; Semifinals	Menlo; Saint John's (MN); Dayton	W 7–3; W 13–3; L 0–34
1988	Ron Schipper	First round Quarterfinals; Semifinals; Stagg Bowl	Concordia–Moorhead; Wisconsin–Whitewater; Augustana (IL); Ithaca	W 7–0; W 16–13; W 23–17 ^{2OT} L 24–39
1989	Ron Schipper	First round Quarterfinals	St. Norbert; Saint John's (MN)	W 55–7; L 24–27
1990	Ron Schipper	First round Quarterfinals; Semifinals	Redlands; St. Thomas (MN); Allegheny	W 24–14; W 33–32; L 7–24
1992	Ron Schipper	First round Quarterfinals	Carleton; Wisconsin–La Crosse	W 20–8; L 9–34
1994	Ron Schipper	First round	Wartburg	L 21–22
1995	Ron Schipper	First round	Wisconsin–River Falls	L 7–10
1998	Rich Kacmarynski	First round	Wisconsin–Eau Claire	L 21–28
1999	Rich Kacmarynski	First round Second round	Wisconsin–La Crosse; Saint John's (MN)	W 38–17; L 9–10
2000	Rich Kacmarynski	First round Second round Quarterfinals	St. Norbert; Linfield; Saint John's (MN)	W 29–14; W 20–17 ^{OT} L 18–21
2001	Rich Kacmarynski	First round	Pacific Lutheran	L 21–27 ^{OT}
2005	Jeff McMartin	First round	Wisconsin–Whitewater	L 14–34
2006	Jeff McMartin	First round	Saint John's (MN)	L 13–21
2007	Jeff McMartin	First round Second round Quarterfinals	Olivet; Saint John's (MN); Bethel (MN)	W 38–17; W 37–7; L 7–27
2009	Jeff McMartin	First round	Mary Hardin–Baylor	L 40–42
2019	Jeff McMartin	First round Second round	Wisconsin–Oshkosh; Wheaton	W 38–37 ^{OT} L 13–49
2021	Jeff McMartin	First round Second round Quarterfinals	Bethel (MN); Wheaton; Wisconsin–Whitewater	W 61–35; W 30–28; L 21–51

== List of head coaches ==
=== Key ===
Key to symbols in coaches list
General		Overall		Conference		Postseason (Note: Although the first Rose Bowl Game was played in 1902, it has been continuously played since the 1916 game, and is recognized as the oldest bowl game by the NCAA. "—" indicates any season prior to 1916 when postseason games were not played.)	
No.	Order of coaches (Note: A running total of the number of head coaches, with coaches who served separate tenures being counted only once. Interim head coaches are represented with "Int" and are not counted in the running total. "—" indicates the team played but either without a coach or no coach is on record. "X" indicates an interim year without play.)	GC	Games coached	CW	Conference wins	PW	Postseason wins
DC	Division championships	OW	Overall wins	CL	Conference losses	PL	Postseason losses
CC	Conference championships	OL	Overall losses	CT	Conference ties	PT	Postseason ties
NC	National championships	OT	Overall ties (Note: Overtime rules in college football were introduced in 1996, making ties impossible in the period since.)	C%	Conference winning percentage		
†	Elected to the College Football Hall of Fame	O%	Overall winning percentage (Note: When computing the win–loss percentage, a tie counts as half a win and half a loss.)				

=== Coaches ===
List of head football coaches showing season(s) coached, overall records, conference records, postseason records, championships and selected awards
No.	Name	Season(s)	GC	OW	OL	OT	O%	CW	CL	CT	C%	PW	PL	PT	DC	CC	NC	Awards
1	Herman Severan	1903–1904	7	2	5	0	0.286	–	–	–	–	–	–	–	–	–	–	–
2	George H. Cavanaugh	1905	6	4	2	0	0.667	–	–	–	–	–	–	–	–	–	–	–
3	George H. Kenney	1909	5	1	3	1	0.300	–	–	–	–	–	–	–	–	–	–	–
4	William Johnson	1910–1912	17	4	10	3	0.324	–	–	–	–	–	–	–	–	–	–	–
5	Elbert Warren	1913–1915	12	3	8	1	0.292	–	–	–	–	–	–	–	–	–	–	–
6	Mark McWilliams	1915–1916; 1920	16	2	14	0	0.125	–	–	–	–	–	–	–	–	–	–	–
7	William R. Cruse	1921	5	2	2	1	0.500	–	–	–	–	–	–	–	–	–	–	–
8	Karl Kettering	1922–1924	9	2	6	1	0.278	–	–	–	–	–	–	–	–	–	–	–
9	John Pence	1924–1926	20	7	10	3	0.425	–	–	–	–	–	–	–	–	–	–	–
10	William Douthirt	1927	8	1	7	0	0.125	–	–	–	–	–	–	–	–	–	–	–
11	Len Winter	1928–1937	84	34	44	6	0.440	–	–	–	–	–	–	–	–	–	–	–
12	Richard Tysseling	1938–1960	173	83	87	7	0.489	–	–	–	–	–	–	–	–	–	–	–
13	Ron Schipper	1961–1996	357	287	67	3	0.808	–	–	–	–	–	–	–	–	18	–	–
14	Rich Kacmarynski	1997–2003	77	62	15	0	0.805	–	–	–	–	–	–	–	–	4	–	–
15	Jeff McMartin	2004–present	223	171	52	0	0.767	166	128	38	0	0.771	–	–	–	6	–	–

== Year-by-year results ==
National champions	Conference champions	Bowl game berth	Playoff berth

Season	Year	Head coach	Association	Division	Conference	Record							Postseason	Final ranking
Season	Year	Head coach	Association	Division	Conference	Overall			Conference				Postseason	Final ranking
Season	Year	Head coach	Association	Division	Conference	Win	Loss	Tie	Finish	Win	Loss	Tie	Postseason	Final ranking
Central Dutch
1892	1892	—	—	—	—	0	1	0	–				—	—
1893	1893	—	—	—	—	0	1	0	–				—	—
No record 1894–1902
1903	1903	Herman Severan	—	—	—	1	2	0	–				—	—
1904	1904	Herman Severan	—	—	—	1	3	0	–				—	—
1905	1905	G. Gavanaugh	IAAUS	—	—	4	2	0	–				—	—
Sport dropped 1906–1908
1909	1909	G. Kenney	IAAUS	—	—	1	3	1	–				—	—
1910	1910	Wm. Johnson	NCAA	—	—	0	5	1	–				—	—
1911	1911	Wm. Johnson	NCAA	—	—	1	2	0	–				—	—
1912	1912	Wm. Johnson	NCAA	—	—	3	3	2	–				—	—
1913	1913	Elbert Warren	NCAA	—	—	2	4	1	–				—	—
1914	1914	Elbert Warren	NCAA	—	—	1	4	0	–				—	—
1915	1915	Mark McWilliams	NCAA	—	—	0	6	0	–				—	—
1916	1916	Mark McWilliams	NCAA	—	—	2	4	0	–				—	—
No record 1917–1919
1920	1920	Mark McWilliams	NCAA	–	–	0	4	0	–				—	—
1921	1921	Wm. R. Cruse	NCAA	–	–	2	2	1	–				—	—
1922	1922	Karl Kettering	NCAA	–	–	1	4	1	–				—	—
1923	1923	Karl Kettering	NCAA	–	IIAC	1	2	0	8th	1	1	0	—	—
1924	1924	John Pence	NCAA	–	IIAC	2	4	1	8th	1	2	0	—	—
1925	1925	John Pence	NCAA	–	IIAC	2	3	1	10th	1	2	1	—	—
1926	1926	John Pence	NCAA	–	IIAC	3	3	1	8th	2	2	0	—	—
1927	1927	Wm. Douthirt	NCAA	–	IIAC	1	7	0	12th	1	6	0	—	—
1928	1928	L.A. Winter	NCAA	–	IIAC	0	8	0	14th	0	8	0	—	—
1929	1929	L.A. Winter	NCAA	–	IIAC	3	4	1	8th	2	4	0	—	—
1930	1930	L.A. Winter	NCAA	–	IIAC	6	2	0	7th	3	2	0	—	—
1931	1931	L.A. Winter	NCAA	–	IIAC	5	1	2	3rd	3	1	2	—	—
1932	1932	L.A. Winter	NCAA	–	IIAC	6	2	0	6th	5	2	0	—	—
1933	1933	L.A. Winter	NCAA	–	IIAC	2	6	1	11th	1	5	1	—	—
1934	1934	L.A. Winter	NCAA	–	IIAC	1	6	1	12th	1	6	1	—	—
1935	1935	L.A. Winter	NCAA	–	IIAC	4	5	0	6th	3	3	0	—	—
1936	1936	L.A. Winter	NCAA	–	IIAC	4	5	0	7th	4	3	0	—	—
1937	1937	L.A. Winter	NCAA	–	IIAC	3	5	1	7th	3	2	1	—	—
1938	1938	Richard Tysseling	NCAA	–	IIAC	2	6	0	10th	2	4	0	—	—
1939	1939	Richard Tysseling	NCAA	–	IIAC	7	2	0	T-1st	5	2	0	Conference champions	—
1940	1940	Richard Tysseling	NCAA	–	IIAC	6	3	0	5th	5	3	0	—	—
1941	1941	Richard Tysseling	NCAA	–	IIAC	6	3	0	4th	6	2	0	—	—
1942	1942	Richard Tysseling	NCAA	–	IIAC	3	4	1	8th	2	3	1	—	—
1943	1943	Richard Tysseling	NCAA	–	IIAC	4	3	0	–				—	—
1944	1944	Richard Tysseling	NCAA	–	IIAC	2	2	0	–				—	—
1945	1945	Richard Tysseling	NCAA	–	IIAC	7	1	0	T-1st	5	0	0	Conference champions	—
1946	1946	Richard Tysseling	NCAA	–	IIAC	7	1	0	1st	6	0	0	Conference champions	—
1947	1947	Richard Tysseling	NCAA	–	IIAC	7	1	1	5th	5	0	1	—	—
1948	1948	Richard Tysseling	NCAA	–	IIAC	5	2	1	5th	3	2	0	—	—
1949	1949	Richard Tysseling	NCAA	–	IIAC	4	4	1	4th	3	1	0	—	—
1950	1950	Richard Tysseling	NCAA	–	IIAC	2	7	0	6th	1	4	0	—	—
1951	1951	Richard Tysseling	NCAA	–	IIAC	3	6	0	5th	1	4	0	—	—
1952	1952	Richard Tysseling	NCAA	–	IIAC	1	7	0	5th	0	4	0	—	—
1953	1953	Richard Tysseling	NCAA	–	IIAC	4	3	1	2nd	3	1	0	—	—
1954	1954	Richard Tysseling	NCAA	–	IIAC	3	5	0	7th	1	5	0	—	—
1955	1955	Richard Tysseling	NCAA	College Division	IIAC	3	5	0	8th	1	5	0	—	—
1956	1956	Richard Tysseling	NCAA	College Division	IIAC	7	1	0	1st	7	1	0	Conference champions	—
1957	1957	Richard Tysseling	NCAA	College Division	IIAC	3	4	1	7th	2	4	1	—	—
1958	1958	Richard Tysseling	NCAA	College Division	IIAC	0	8	1	9th	0	7	1	—	—
1959	1959	Richard Tysseling	NCAA	College Division	IIAC	3	6	0	7th	2	6	0	—	—
1960	1960	Richard Tysseling	NCAA	College Division	IIAC	3	6	0	7th	3	5	0	—	—
1961	1961	Ron Schipper	NCAA	College Division	IIAC	6	3	0	3rd	5	3	0	—	—
1962	1962	Ron Schipper	NCAA	College Division	IIAC	7	2	0	2nd	7	1	0	—	—
1963	1963	Ron Schipper	NCAA	College Division	IIAC	7	1	1	2nd	6	1	1	—	—
1964	1964	Ron Schipper	NCAA	College Division	IIAC	8	1	0	T-1st	7	1	0	Conference champions	—
1965	1965	Ron Schipper	NCAA	College Division	IIAC	8	1	0	1st	7	0	0	Conference champions	—
1966	1966	Ron Schipper	NCAA	College Division	IIAC	9	1	0	1st	7	0	0	Conference champions	—
1967	1967	Ron Schipper	NCAA	College Division	IIAC	9	0	0	1st	7	0	0	Conference champions	—
1968	1968	Ron Schipper	NCAA	College Division	IIAC	5	3	1	4th	3	3	1	—	—
1969	1969	Ron Schipper	NCAA	College Division	IIAC	6	3	0	T-2nd	5	2	0	—	—
1970	1970	Ron Schipper	NCAA	College Division	IIAC	6	2	0	2nd	5	2	0	—	—
1971	1971	Ron Schipper	NCAA	College Division	IIAC	6	3	0	T-4th	4	3	0	—	—
1972	1972	Ron Schipper	NCAA	College Division	IIAC	6	3	0	3rd	5	2	0	—	—
1973	1973	Ron Schipper	NCAA	Division III	IIAC	7	2	0	2nd	6	1	0	—	—
1974	1974	Ron Schipper	NCAA	Division III	IIAC	11	0	0	1st	7	0	0	National champions	—
1975	1975	Ron Schipper	NCAA	Division III	IIAC	5	4	0	3rd	4	3	0	—	—
1976	1976	Ron Schipper	NCAA	Division III	IIAC	7	2	0	3rd	5	2	0	—	—
1977	1977	Ron Schipper	NCAA	Division III	IIAC	9	1	0	1st	7	0	0	Playoff berth	—
1978	1978	Ron Schipper	NCAA	Division III	IIAC	5	4	0	T-1st	5	2	0	Conference champions	—
1979	1979	Ron Schipper	NCAA	Division III	IIAC	6	3	0	3rd	5	2	0	—	—
1980	1980	Ron Schipper	NCAA	Division III	IIAC	5	4	0	2nd	5	2	0	—	—
1981	1981	Ron Schipper	NCAA	Division III	IIAC	6	2	1	1st	6	1	0	Conference champions	—
1982	1982	Ron Schipper	NCAA	Division III	IIAC	8	2	0	2nd	6	1	0	—	—
1983	1983	Ron Schipper	NCAA	Division III	IIAC	7	2	0	1st	6	1	0	Conference champions	—
1984	1984	Ron Schipper	NCAA	Division III	IIAC	11	1	0	1st	7	0	0	Playoff berth	—
1985	1985	Ron Schipper	NCAA	Division III	IIAC	11	1	0	1st	7	0	0	Playoff berth	—
1986	1986	Ron Schipper	NCAA	Division III	IIAC	11	1	0	1st	8	0	0	Playoff berth	3
1987	1987	Ron Schipper	NCAA	Division III	IIAC	11	2	0	1st	7	1	0	Playoff berth	—
1988	1988	Ron Schipper	NCAA	Division III	IIAC	11	2	0	2nd	7	1	0	Playoff berth	—
1989	1989	Ron Schipper	NCAA	Division III	IIAC	10	1	0	1st	9	0	0	Playoff berth	—
1990	1990	Ron Schipper	NCAA	Division III	IIAC	10	2	0	1st	8	0	0	Playoff berth	—
1991	1991	Ron Schipper	NCAA	Division III	IIAC	8	1	0	2nd	7	1	0	—	—
1992	1992	Ron Schipper	NCAA	Division III	IIAC	10	1	0	1st	8	0	0	Playoff berth	—
1993	1993	Ron Schipper	NCAA	Division III	IIAC	8	1	0	2nd	7	1	0	—	—
1994	1994	Ron Schipper	NCAA	Division III	IIAC	10	1	0	1st	8	0	0	Playoff berth	—
1995	1995	Ron Schipper	NCAA	Division III	IIAC	10	1	0	1st	8	0	0	Playoff berth	—
1996	1996	Ron Schipper	NCAA	Division III	IIAC	7	3	0	2nd	7	1	0	—	—
1997	1997	Rich Kacmarynski	NCAA	Division III	IIAC	8	2	0	2nd	7	1	0	—	—
1998	1998	Rich Kacmarynski	NCAA	Division III	IIAC	10	1	0	1st	10	0	0	Playoff berth	—
1999	1999	Rich Kacmarynski	NCAA	Division III	IIAC	10	2	0	2nd	9	1	0	Playoff berth	—
2000	2000	Rich Kacmarynski	NCAA	Division III	IIAC	12	1	0	1st	10	0	0	Playoff berth	—
2001	2001	Rich Kacmarynski	NCAA	Division III	IIAC	9	2	0	1st	8	1	0	Playoff berth	—
2002	2002	Rich Kacmarynski	NCAA	Division III	IIAC	8	2	0	T-1st	8	1	0	Conference champions	—
2003	2003	Rich Kacmarynski	NCAA	Division III	IIAC	5	5	0	T-6th	3	5	0	—	—
2004	2004	Jeff McMartin	NCAA	Division III	IIAC	6	4	0	T-3rd	5	3	0	—	—
2005	2005	Jeff McMartin	NCAA	Division III	IIAC	9	2	0	T-1st	7	1	0	Playoff berth	20
2006	2006	Jeff McMartin	NCAA	Division III	IIAC	10	1	0	1st	8	0	0	Playoff berth	11
2007	2007	Jeff McMartin	NCAA	Division III	IIAC	12	1	0	1st	8	0	0	Playoff berth	6
2008	2008	Jeff McMartin	NCAA	Division III	IIAC	6	4	0	T-5th	4	4	0	—	—
2009	2009	Jeff McMartin	NCAA	Division III	IIAC	10	1	0	1st	8	0	0	Playoff berth	8
2010	2010	Jeff McMartin	NCAA	Division III	IIAC	8	2	0	3rd	6	2	0	—	—
2011	2011	Jeff McMartin	NCAA	Division III	IIAC	7	3	0	T-2nd	6	2	0	—	—
2012	2012	Jeff McMartin	NCAA	Division III	IIAC	5	5	0	T-2nd	4	3	0	—	—
2013	2013	Jeff McMartin	NCAA	Division III	IIAC	6	4	0	T-3rd	4	3	0	—	—
2014	2014	Jeff McMartin	NCAA	Division III	IIAC	8	2	0	2nd	6	1	0	—	—
2015	2015	Jeff McMartin	NCAA	Division III	IIAC	6	4	0	3rd	4	3	0	—	—
2016	2016	Jeff McMartin	NCAA	Division III	IIAC	8	2	0	T-2nd	6	2	0	—	—
2017	2017	Jeff McMartin	NCAA	Division III	IIAC	7	3	0	2nd	6	2	0	—	—
2018	2018	Jeff McMartin	NCAA	Division III	A-R-C	8	2	0	T-2nd	6	2	0	—	—
2019	2019	Jeff McMartin	NCAA	Division III	A-R-C	10	2	0	T-1st	7	1	0	Playoff berth	17
2020–21	2020–21	Jeff McMartin	NCAA	Division III	A-R-C	2	0	0	–	2	0	0	—	—
2021	2021	Jeff McMartin	NCAA	Division III	A-R-C	12	1	0	1st	7	0	0	Playoff berth	20
2022	2022	Jeff McMartin	NCAA	Division III	A-R-C	7	3	0	T–4th	5	3	0	—	—
2023	2023	Jeff McMartin	NCAA	Division III	A-R-C	8	2	0	3rd	6	2	0	—	—
2024	2024	Jeff McMartin	NCAA	Division III	A-R-C	8	2	0	3rd	6	2	0	—	—
2025	2025	Jeff McMartin	NCAA	Division III	A-R-C	8	2	0	3rd	6	2	0	—	—
