= Central College (Iowa) =

College in Pella, Iowa, U.S.

- Former name: Central University of Iowa
- Type: Private college
- Established: 1853; 173 years ago
- Academic affiliations: CIC
- Endowment: $84.2 million (2025)
- President: Mark Putnam
- Faculty: 91 full-time (fall 2023)
- Students: 1,169 (fall 2022)
- Location: Pella, Iowa; 41.4002°N 92.9186°W
- Campus: Urban, 130 acres (53 ha)
- Colors: Red & white
- Nickname: Dutch
- Sporting affiliations: NCAA Division III – A-R-C
- Website: central.edu
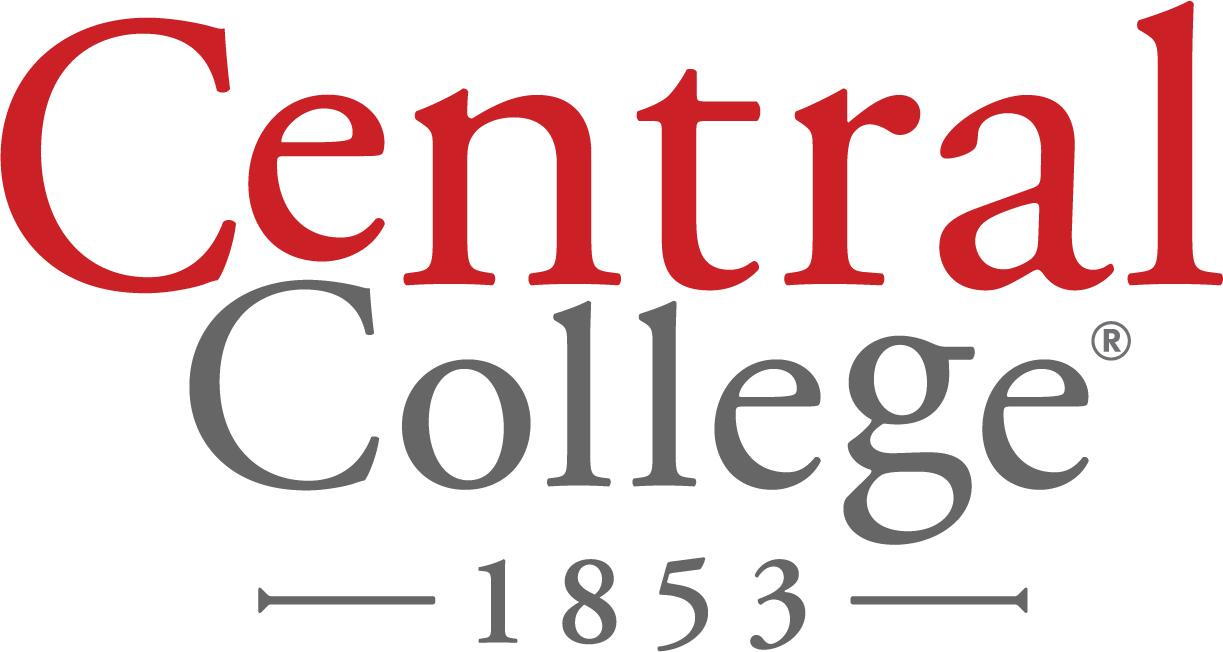

Central College is a private college in Pella, Iowa, United States. It is accredited by the Higher Learning Commission. Central has a student body of approximately 1,100 undergraduates and more than 60 academic programs.

== History ==
The Baptist Convention of Iowa founded Central University of Iowa in 1853 and it officially opened on October 8, 1854. The first class totaled 37 people. In 1886, Iowa Baptists had shifted their post-secondary education interests to Des Moines College, and hoped to reduce Central to a feeder school. Central was a Baptist institution until 1916, when it was transferred to the control of the Reformed Church in America. Since 2021 when the RCA experienced a split, Central has remained loosely associated with the denomination.

The college was called Central University of Iowa (CUI), at least until 1991. It was renamed "Central College" in 1994.

It was home to local radio station 89.1 KCUI-FM and the award-winning newspaper The Ray.

Central has a history of interesting architectural features. The first buildings of the new college in 1853 were Dutch Colonial and part of what was recently known as Strawtown Inn. The first dormitory, Cotton Hall, is noted for its ornate Victorian porch and stained glass windows. Building innovation continues with the addition of "green" buildings.

In September 2019, it was announced that Central College would lower their yearly tuition starting in the fall 2020 semester, dropping to $18,600, from $38,600. In 2018, the college graduated its first majors from the engineering program. In 2023, the college conferred its first Bachelor of Science degrees in chemistry and biochemistry. That same year, it began offering a Bachelor of Science in accounting and a minor in social justice. The following year, Central awarded its first degree in musical theatre.

== Campus ==
Central College's 130-acre (53 ha) campus is a few blocks from Pella's downtown square, two minutes from Iowa's largest lake and 40 minutes from Des Moines. Pella's annual Tulip Festival attracts more than 100,000 visitors each spring. Central is a residential campus where students can live in residence halls, townhouses, and apartment style "green pods."

The college's emphasis on sustainability has led to Leadership in Energy and Environmental Design (LEED) ratings from the U.S. Green Building Council. The Vermeer Science Center was Iowa's first LEED-rated building, and Howard McKee Hall received the first gold rating in the state. The newest building, Roe Center, received a platinum rating.

=== Major buildings ===
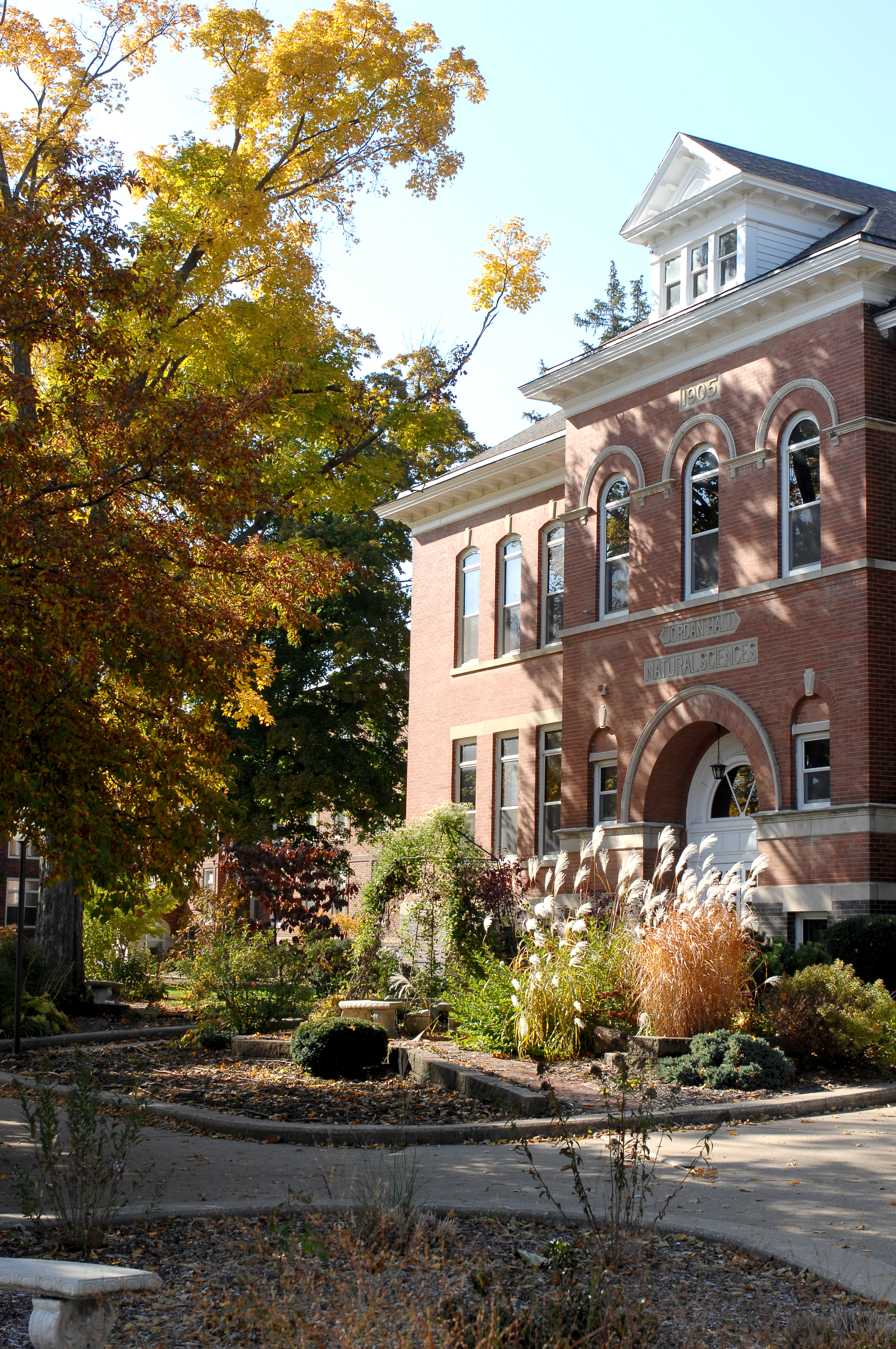
Central College's oldest building, Jordan Hall

Maytag Student Center—During the summer of 2014, the student center underwent a $3.1 million renovation to Maytag Student Center made possible by the Fred Maytag Family foundation. The renovations include a new workout facility, a new Student Activity Center and additional Fred's dining area.

The Roe Center—Named after Central's 20th president, David H. Roe, was completed in the fall of 2009. The $17 million facility houses the education and psychology departments, as well as Community-Based Learning. Central College was awarded a platinum Leadership in Energy and Environmental Design (LEED) rating from the United States Green Building Council (USGBC) for the design of the Roe Center. The facility features environmentally friendly building practices and an energy efficient building design, such as a green roof, natural ventilating system, radiant floor heating/cooling system and daylight harvesting systems.

Vermeer Science Center—Underwent a $20 million renovation in 2003, and was the first building in the state of Iowa and the first science building in the nation to be recognized as a green building by the U.S. Green Building Council. It was subsequently awarded a silver LEED (Leadership in Energy and Environmental Design) rating. The mathematics, computer science, physics, biology and chemistry departments are located in the building. Vermeer features many study spaces and quiet tables located outside professors’ offices that encourage student/faculty interaction.

Weller Center for Business and International Studies—Built in 1999, it was Central's first step in green building featuring natural light, solar panels and carpet made of recycled materials in every room. It contains the business, foreign language, international studies and communication studies departments.

Central Market—Central's main dining facility. It is designed to resemble a European marketplace.

Geisler Library—Holds nearly a quarter of a million resources including books, magazines, newspapers, music, reference periodicals, microfilm, historical information and art.

Kuyper Athletic Complex—The Ron and Joyce Schipper Stadium replaced its Fieldturf in 2024. The field is surrounded by a 400-meter BSS 1000 polyurethane track which also houses dual runways for jumping events and a two-way pole vault pit. The H.S. Kuyper Fieldhouse houses a 200-meter track and four tennis courts. The surface is Mondotrack, which is the same surface used in the 2008 Olympic games in Beijing.

== Academics ==
Central offers more than 60 academic programs and pre-professional advising. Pre-professional programs include medicine, law, nursing and pharmacy. Academic programs include: accounting, athletic training, biology, communication studies, computer science, education, music, natural science, physics and languages. 74% of faculty have a PhD or other terminal degree. The average class size is 16 students and the student to faculty ratio is 12–1.

Central students are encouraged to get involved in off-campus experiences during their time on campus. Central offers year-round programs around the world. Summer programs are also available in many locations.

== Athletics ==
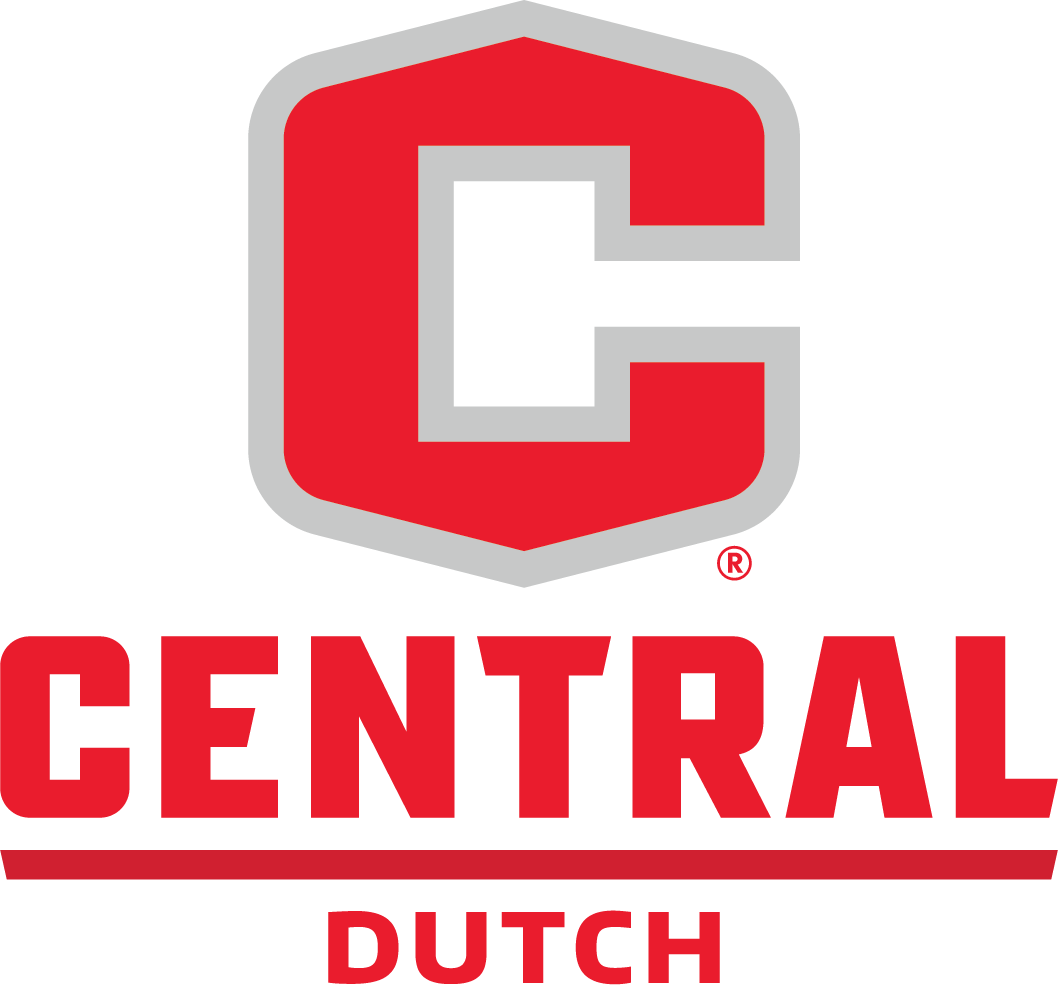
Central Dutch primary logo

Central has 21 sports programs and competes in the A-R-C of the NCAA. Sports include football, wrestling, volleyball, softball, baseball, women's triathlon, golf, track, cross country, soccer, basketball, tennis, cheerleading and dance. Intramural sports are also offered.

Highlights of Central athletics programs include:

- 500+ All-America Awards
- 11 NCAA Division III Titles in Six Sports
- 38 National Individual Championships
- 190 Conference Team Championships
- 80 CSC Academic All-American® Awards
- 24 Conference All-Sports Titles
- 27 NCAA Postgraduate Scholarship Winners

=== Varsity teams ===
Central College's athletic teams include:

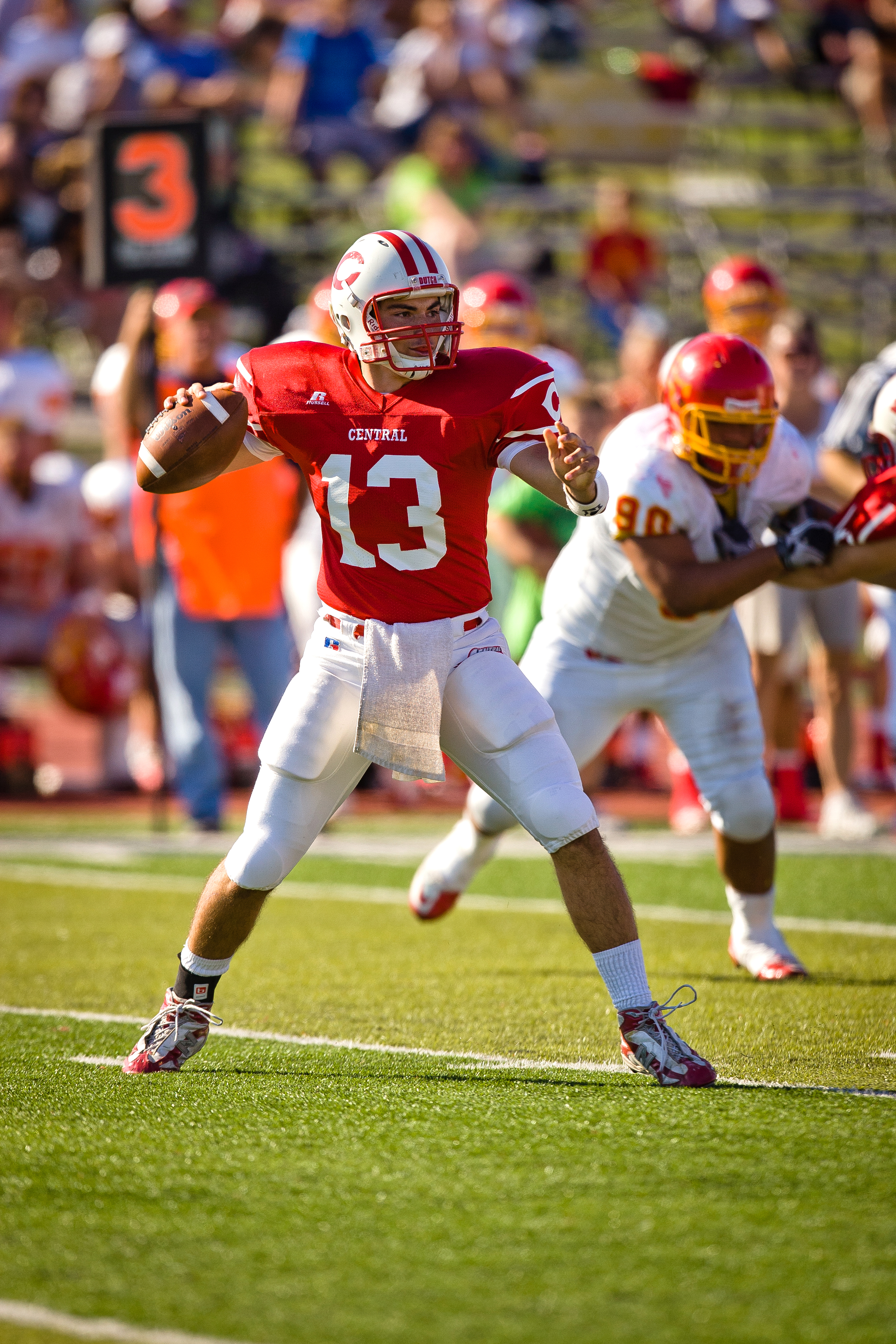
Central Dutch football game in 2010

Men's sports	Women's sports
Baseball	Basketball
Basketball	Cross country
Cross country	Golf
Football	Soccer
Golf	Softball
Soccer	Tennis
Tennis	Track and field
Track and field	Triathlon
Wrestling	Volleyball
	Wrestling

== Student life ==
Central has over 100 clubs and activities for students. Students are also given the opportunity to create their own club recognized by the college.

Clubs and Organizations include intramural sports, mock trial, non-national Greek life, Campus Ministries and more.

There are honorary organizations for theatre, chemistry, mathematics, art, music, history, political science, psychology, English and biology.

There are also music ensembles, including A Cappella Choir, chamber singers, steel drum ensemble, pep band, jazz band, woodwind ensemble and community orchestra.

== Notable alumni ==
- Bernadette M. Allen, (1978) former United States Ambassador to Niger
- Bert Bandstra, (1950) member of the United States House of Representatives from Iowa
- George Alfred Baitsell, (B.S. 1908) United States biologist and official of the American Association for the Advancement of Science
- Cyrenus Cole, (1887) member of the United States House of Representatives from Iowa
- Vern Den Herder, (1970) defensive end who was part of the Miami Dolphins' "No Name Defense" that won 2 consecutive Super Bowls, and is a member of the College Football Hall of Fame.
- Jann Freed, (1977) Central College professor emeritus of business management
- Adam Gregg, (2006) President and CEO of the Iowa Bankers Association, Former Lieutenant Governor of Iowa 2017–2024. Public Defender of Iowa from December 8, 2014, to May 25, 2017.
- Jake Hirst, (2017) baseball coach
- John Hospers, (1939) first U.S. presidential candidate for the Libertarian Party.
- Solomon F. Prouty, (1877) member of the United States House of Representatives from Iowa
- Cory Synhorst SerVaas, (1946) editor, inventor, and doctor
- Harry Smith, (1973) television reporter
