= 2025 NCAA Division III football season =

American college football season

- Total No. of teams: 241
- Regular season: September 4 – November 15, 2025
- Playoffs: November 22 – January 4, 2026
- National championship: Tom Benson Hall of Fame Stadium; Canton, OH; January 4, 2026
- Champion: Wisconsin–River Falls
- Gagliardi Trophy: Wisconsin–River Falls quarterback Kaleb Blaha

The 2025 NCAA Division III football season was the component of the 2025 college football season organized by the NCAA at the Division III level in the United States. The regular season began on September 4 and ended on November 15. This was the 52nd season that the NCAA has sponsored a Division III championship.

North Central (IL) was the defending champion.

The season's playoffs were played between November 22 and January 4, 2026, culminating in the national championship—also known as the Stagg Bowl—at Tom Benson Hall of Fame Stadium in Canton, Ohio. Wisconsin–River Falls won the 2026 Stagg Bowl 24–14 over North Central (IL).

== Conference changes and new programs ==
- The Eastern Collegiate Football Conference disbanded following the 2024 season, as its remaining members all departed to join other conferences.

=== Membership changes ===
Team	Former conference	New conference	Source
Alfred State Pioneers	ECFC	Empire 8	
Anna Maria Amcats	ECFC	MASCAC	
Carnegie Mellon Tartans	PAC	Centennial	
Castleton Spartans	MASCAC	NJAC	
Dean Bulldogs	ECFC	MASCAC	
Ferrum Panthers	ODAC	Carolinas (D-II)	
Gallaudet Bison	ECFC	ODAC	
Hendrix Warriors	SAA	SCAC	
Hilbert Hawks	Empire 8	Liberty	
Hiram Terriers	NCAC	PAC	
John Carroll Blue Streaks	OAC	NCAC	
Keystone Giants	Landmark	Independent	
Maine Maritime Mariners	Independent	CNE	
Maryville Scots	USA South	SAA	
New England College Pilgrims	New program	CNE	
Roanoke Maroons	New program	ODAC	
Western Connecticut Wolves	MASCAC	Landmark	

== Other headlines ==
- April 18 – The NESCAC announced that it would begin allowing its teams to participate in the NCAA Division III Championship, beginning in the 2026 season.
- October 18 – Curry running back Montie Quinn ran for 522 yards, a new all-divisions NCAA record, in the Colonels' 71–27 win over Nichols.

== Top 10 matchups ==
=== Regular season games ===
Date	Visiting team	Home team	Site	Result	Attendance	Ref.
September 20	No. 3 Johns Hopkins	No. 4 Susquehanna	Amos Alonzo Stagg Field • Selinsgrove, Pennsylvania	40–22	3,028	
October 4	No. 5 UW–La Crosse	No. 9 UW–Whitewater	Perkins Stadium • Whitewater, Wisconsin	23–20	20,167	
October 25	No. 8 UW–Platteville	No. 9 UW–Whitewater	Perkins Stadium • Whitewater, Wisconsin (George Chryst Memorial Bowl)	19–29	9,748	
November 1	No. 8 UW–Whitewater	No. 9 UW–River Falls	Ramer Field • River Falls, Wisconsin	14–52	1,811	
November 8	No. 9 UW–La Crosse	No. 8 UW–River Falls	Ramer Field • River Falls, Wisconsin	7–41	2,255	
^{#}Rankings from D3football.com poll released prior to the game.

=== Postseason tournament ===
Date	Visiting team	Home team	Site	Result	Attendance	Ref.
November 6	No. 9 John Carroll	No. 2 Mount Union	Kehres Stadium • Alliance, Ohio (Third round)	10–7 ^{2OT}	2,248	
December 6	No. 7 St. John's (MN)	No. 3 UW–River Falls	Smith Stadium at Ramer Field • River Falls, Wisconsin (Third round)	14–42	3,205	
December 6	No. 10 UW–Platteville	No. 4 Bethel (MN)	Royal Stadium • Arden Hills, Minnesota (Third round)	24–35	3,139	
December 13	No. 4 Bethel (MN)	No. 1 North Central (IL)	Benedetti–Wehrli Stadium • Naperville, Illinois (Quarterfinal)	21–35	442	
December 20	No. 8 Johns Hopkins	No. 3 UW–River Falls	Smith Stadium at Ramer Field • River Falls, Wisconsin (Semifinal)	41–48	2,897	
December 20	No. 9 John Carroll	No. 1 North Central (IL)	Benedetti–Wehrli Stadium • Naperville, Illinois (Semifinal)	21–41	1,317	
January 4, 2026	No. 3 UW–River Falls	No. 1 North Central (IL)	Tom Benson Hall of Fame Stadium • Canton, Ohio (Satgg Bowl LII)	24–14	2,403	
^{#}Rankings from D3football.com poll released on November 16.

== Upsets ==
This section lists unranked teams defeating D3football.com poll-ranked teams during the season.

Date	Visiting team	Home team	Site	Result	Attendance	Ref.
September 6	UW–Oshkosh	No. 16 Linfield	Maxwell Field • McMinnville, Oregon	31–14	1,712	
September 6	No. 13 Springfield	Western New England	Golden Bear Stadium • Springfield, Massachusetts (Battle for the Pynchon SAW Trophy)	22–23	3,800	
September 6	UW–Platteville	No. 22 Aurora	Spartan Athletic Park • Montgomery, Illinois	41–0	2,076	
September 13	No. 24 Whitworth	Eastern Oregon (Note: It is a NAIA football team.)	Community Stadium • La Grande, Oregon	10–16	0	
September 16	No. 19 Randolph–Macon	Central (IA)	Ron and Joyce Schipper Stadium • Pella, Iowa	0–10	1,500	
September 20	No. 25 Brockport	RPI	East Campus Stadium • Troy, New York	24–30 ^{OT}	971	
September 27	Alma	No. 15 Hope	Ray & Sue Smith Stadium • Holland, Michigan	29–26 ^{OT}	3,206	
September 27	No. 16 Mary Hardin–Baylor	Mars Hill (Note: It is a D-II football team.)	Meares Stadium • Mars Hill, North Carolina	7–21	1,250	
September 27	No. 13 Susquehanna	Christopher Newport	TowneBank Stadium • Newport News, Virginia	27–41	3,726	
September 27	Washington & Jefferson	No. 18 Grove City	Robert E. Thorn Field • Grove City, Pennsylvania	34–14	5,000	
October 4	Washington & Lee	No. 24 Hampden–Sydney	Lewis C. Everett Stadium • Hampden Sydney, Virginia	42–34	7,542	
October 11	No. 11 UW–Oshkosh	UW–Stout	Don and Nona Williams Stadium • Menomonie, Wisconsin	16–27	2,738	
October 11	No. 16 Trinity (TX)	Berry	Valhalla Stadium • Mount Berry, Georgia	6–29	3,956	
October 11	No. 25 Muhlenberg	Franklin & Marshall	Shadek Stadium • Lancaster, Pennsylvania	27–28	875	
October 18	Whitworth	No. 24 Linfield	Maxwell Field • McMinnville, Oregon	30–20	1,499	
October 25	No. 16 Carnegie Mellon	Muhlenberg	Scotty Wood Stadium • Allentown, Pennsylvania	23–27	2,213	
November 8	No. 5 Hardin–Simmons	Mary Hardin–Baylor	Crusader Stadium • Belton, Texas	17–21	2,778	
November 8	No. 22 Baldwin Wallace	Ohio Northern	Dial–Roberson Stadium • Ada, Ohio	28–30	874	
November 15	Coe	No. 19 Central (IA)	Ron and Joyce Schipper Stadium • Pella, Iowa	13–7	2,750	
November 15	No. 20 Cortland	Ithaca	Jim Butterfield Stadium • Ithaca, New York (Cortaca Jug)	21–26	8,000	
^{#}Rankings from D3football.com poll released prior to the game.

== Conference standings ==
2025 American Rivers Conference football standings
	Conf.			Overall
Team	W		L	W		L
No. 12 Wartburg $^	8	–	0	10	–	1
No. 25 Coe ^	7	–	1	9	–	3
Central (IA)	6	–	2	8	–	2
Simpson (IA)	5	–	3	6	–	4
Dubuque	4	–	4	4	–	6
Loras	3	–	5	3	–	7
Buena Vista	2	–	6	3	–	7
Nebraska Wesleyan	1	–	7	1	–	9
Luther	0	–	8	0	–	10
$ – Conference champion; ^ – NCAA Division III playoff participant; Rankings from D3football.com

2025 American Southwest Conference football standings
	Conf.			Overall
Team	W		L	W		L
No. 20 Hardin–Simmons +^	5	–	1	9	–	2
Mary Hardin–Baylor +	5	–	1	7	–	3
Howard Payne	2	–	4	4	–	6
East Texas Baptist	0	–	6	4	–	6
+ – Conference co-champions; ^ – NCAA Division III playoff participant; Rankings from D3football.com

2025 College Conference of Illinois and Wisconsin football standings
	Conf.			Overall
Team	W		L	W		L
No. 2 North Central (IL) $^	9	–	0	14	–	1
No. 7 Wheaton (IL) ^	8	–	1	11	–	3
Washington University	7	–	2	8	–	3
Augustana (IL)	6	–	3	7	–	3
Carroll (WI)	4	–	5	4	–	6
Illinois Wesleyan	4	–	5	4	–	6
Carthage	3	–	6	4	–	6
Millikin	2	–	7	3	–	7
North Park	2	–	7	3	–	7
Elmhurst	0	–	9	1	–	9
$ – Conference champion; ^ – NCAA Division III playoff participant; Rankings from D3Football.com

2025 Centennial Conference football standings
	Conf.			Overall
Team	W		L	W		L
No. 23 Franklin & Marshall $^	7	–	0	9	–	2
No. 3 Johns Hopkins ^	6	–	1	12	–	2
Muhlenberg ^	5	–	2	9	–	3
Ursinus	3	–	4	7	–	4
Carnegie Mellon	3	–	4	6	–	5
Dickinson	3	–	4	5	–	6
Gettysburg	1	–	6	1	–	9
McDaniel	0	–	7	1	–	9
$ – Conference champion; ^ – NCAA Division III playoff participant; Rankings from D3football.com

2025 Empire 8 Athletic Conference football standings
	Conf.			Overall
Team	W		L	W		L
Cortland $^	7	–	0	8	–	3
Utica	6	–	1	8	–	3
St. John Fisher	5	–	2	7	–	4
Brockport	4	–	3	7	–	4
Alfred State	3	–	4	5	–	5
Alfred	2	–	5	4	–	6
Hartwick	1	–	6	4	–	6
Morrisville	0	–	7	0	–	10
$ – Conference champion; ^ – NCAA Division III playoff participant; Rankings from D3Football.com

2025 Heartland Collegiate Athletic Conference football standings
	Conf.			Overall
Team	W		L	W		L
Hanover $^	6	–	0	9	–	3
Mount St. Joseph	5	–	1	6	–	5
Bluffton	3	–	3	5	–	5
Franklin (IN)	3	–	3	5	–	5
Rose–Hulman	3	–	3	3	–	7
Anderson (IN)	1	–	5	2	–	8
Manchester	0	–	6	0	–	10
$ – Conference champion; ^ – NCAA Division III playoff participant

2025 Landmark Conference football standings
	Conf.			Overall
Team	W		L	W		L
No. 13 Susquehanna $^	6	–	0	11	–	3
Lycoming	5	–	1	5	–	6
Wilkes	4	–	2	7	–	4
Western Connecticut	2	–	4	5	–	5
Catholic University	2	–	4	3	–	7
Moravian	2	–	4	2	–	8
Juniata	0	–	6	2	–	8
$ – Conference champion; ^ – NCAA Division III playoff participant; Rankings from D3Football.com

2025 Liberty League football standings
	Conf.			Overall
Team	W		L	W		L
Union (NY) $^	7	–	0	8	–	3
Ithaca	6	–	1	8	–	2
RPI	5	–	2	8	–	3
Hobart	4	–	3	6	–	5
St. Lawrence	3	–	4	4	–	6
Rochester	2	–	5	5	–	5
Buffalo State	1	–	6	1	–	9
Hilbert	0	–	7	0	–	10
$ – Conference champion; ^ – NCAA Division III playoff participant

2025 Massachusetts State Collegiate Athletic Conference football standings
	Conf.			Overall
Team	W		L	W		L
Plymouth State +	7	–	2	8	–	2
Anna Maria +	7	–	2	7	–	3
Framingham State +^	7	–	2	7	–	4
UMass Dartmouth	6	–	3	6	–	4
Bridgewater State	5	–	4	5	–	5
Massachusetts Maritime	5	–	4	5	–	5
Westfield State	3	–	6	3	–	7
Worcester State	3	–	6	3	–	7
Fitchburg State	2	–	7	3	–	7
Dean	0	–	9	0	–	10
+ – Conference co-champions; ^ – NCAA Division III playoff participant

2025 Michigan Intercollegiate Athletic Association football standings
	Conf.			Overall
Team	W		L	W		L
No. 24 Alma $^	7	–	0	8	–	3
No. 19 Hope ^	6	–	1	9	–	2
Adrian	5	–	2	8	–	2
Calvin	4	–	3	7	–	3
Trine	3	–	4	5	–	5
Kalamazoo	1	–	6	4	–	6
Albion	1	–	6	3	–	7
Olivet	1	–	6	1	–	9
$ – Conference champion; ^ – NCAA Division III playoff participant; Rankings from D3Football.com

2025 Middle Atlantic Conference football standings
	Conf.			Overall
Team	W		L	W		L
No. 21 Eastern $^	8	–	1	10	–	2
Delaware Valley	7	–	2	8	–	3
Misericordia	7	–	2	7	–	4
Lebanon Valley	6	–	3	6	–	5
Stevenson	5	–	4	6	–	4
King's (PA)	5	–	4	5	–	5
Albright	3	–	6	4	–	6
Widener	3	–	6	4	–	6
FDU–Florham	1	–	8	1	–	9
Alvernia	0	–	9	0	–	10
$ – Conference champion; ^ – NCAA Division III playoff participant

2025 Midwest Conference football standings
	Conf.			Overall
Team	W		L	W		L
Monmouth (IL) $^	9	–	0	9	–	2
Illinois College	7	–	2	8	–	3
Chicago	7	–	2	7	–	3
Lake Forest	7	–	2	7	–	3
Ripon	5	–	4	5	–	5
Cornell (IA)	4	–	5	4	–	6
Knox	2	–	6	2	–	7
Grinnell	2	–	7	2	–	8
Beloit	1	–	8	1	–	9
Lawrence	0	–	8	0	–	9
$ – Conference champion; ^ – NCAA Division III playoff participant

2025 Minnesota Intercollegiate Athletic Conference football standings
	Conf.			Overall
Team	W		L	W		L
No. 4 Bethel (MN) $^	9	–	0	12	–	1
No. 11 Saint John's (MN) ^	8	–	1	10	–	2
Concordia–Moorhead	6	–	3	7	–	3
Carleton	6	–	3	6	–	4
Gustavus Adolphus	5	–	4	5	–	5
Augsburg	4	–	5	4	–	6
St. Olaf	3	–	6	4	–	6
Macalester	2	–	7	3	–	7
St. Scholastica	2	–	7	3	–	7
Hamline	0	–	9	1	–	9
$ – Conference champion; ^ – NCAA Division III playoff participant; Rankings from D3Football.com

2025 New England Small College Athletic Conference football standings
	Conf.			Overall
Team	W		L	W		L
Trinity (CT) +	7	–	2	7	–	2
Wesleyan +	7	–	2	7	–	2
Colby	6	–	3	6	–	3
Amherst	5	–	4	5	–	4
Middlebury	5	–	4	5	–	4
Williams	5	–	4	5	–	4
Tufts	4	–	5	4	–	5
Bates	2	–	7	2	–	7
Bowdoin	2	–	7	2	–	7
Hamilton	2	–	7	2	–	7
+ – Conference co-champions

2025 Conference of New England football standings
	Conf.			Overall
Team	W		L	W		L
Endicott $^	7	–	0	9	–	2
Curry	6	–	1	8	–	3
New England (ME)	5	–	2	8	–	2
Western New England	4	–	3	6	–	4
Husson	3	–	4	4	–	6
Nichols	2	–	5	2	–	8
New England (NH)	1	–	6	1	–	9
Maine Maritime	0	–	7	0	–	10
$ – Conference champion; ^ – NCAA Division III playoff participant; Rankings from D3Football.com

2025 New England Women's and Men's Athletic Conference football standings
	Conf.			Overall
Team	W		L	W		L
Springfield $^	7	–	0	9	–	3
Merchant Marine	5	–	2	8	–	2
Coast Guard	5	–	2	7	–	3
MIT	4	–	3	6	–	3
Salve Regina	3	–	4	6	–	4
Maritime	3	–	4	5	–	6
WPI	1	–	6	2	–	8
Norwich	0	–	7	1	–	9
$ – Conference champion; ^ – NCAA Division III playoff participant

2025 New Jersey Athletic Conference football standings
	Conf.					Overall
Team		W		L			W		L
No. 17 Christopher Newport $^	7	–	0	–	0	10	–	1	–	0
No. 15 Salisbury ^	6	–	1	–	0	10	–	2	–	0
Rowan	5	–	2	–	0	8	–	2	–	1
Montclair State	4	–	3	–	0	5	–	5	–	0
TCNJ	3	–	4	–	0	6	–	4	–	0
Kean	2	–	5	–	0	3	–	7	–	0
William Paterson	1	–	6	–	0	2	–	8	–	0
Castleton	0	–	7	–	0	2	–	8	–	0
$ – Conference champion; ^ – NCAA Division III playoff participant; Rankings from D3Football.com

2025 North Coast Athletic Conference football standings
	Conf.			Overall
Team	W		L	W		L
No. 5 John Carroll $^	8	–	0	12	–	2
No. 14 DePauw ^	7	–	1	10	–	2
Wabash	6	–	2	9	–	2
Denison	5	–	3	6	–	4
Wooster	4	–	4	5	–	5
Wittenberg	3	–	5	4	–	6
Ohio Wesleyan	2	–	6	3	–	7
Kenyon	1	–	7	1	–	9
Oberlin	0	–	8	0	–	10
$ – Conference champion; ^ – NCAA Division III playoff participant; Rankings from D3Football.com

2025 Northern Athletics Collegiate Conference football standings
	Conf.			Overall
Team	W		L	W		L
Concordia (WI) $^	8	–	0	9	–	2
Aurora	6	–	2	8	–	3
Benedictine (IL)	5	–	3	7	–	3
St. Norbert	5	–	3	5	–	5
Wisconsin Lutheran	5	–	3	5	–	5
Lakeland	4	–	4	4	–	6
Concordia (IL)	2	–	6	4	–	6
Eureka	1	–	7	2	–	8
Rockford	0	–	8	1	–	9
$ – Conference champion; ^ – NCAA Division III playoff participant

2025 Northwest Conference football standings
	Conf.			Overall
Team	W		L	W		L
Whitworth $^	7	–	0	8	–	3
Linfield	6	–	1	7	–	2
Pacific Lutheran	5	–	2	6	–	4
George Fox	4	–	3	4	–	6
Lewis & Clark	3	–	4	6	–	4
Pacific (OR)	2	–	5	3	–	7
Puget Sound	1	–	6	1	–	9
Willamette	0	–	7	1	–	9
$ – Conference champion; ^ – NCAA Division III playoff participant; Rankings from D3Football.com

2025 Ohio Athletic Conference football standings
	Conf.			Overall
Team	W		L	W		L
No. 6 Mount Union $^	8	–	0	11	–	1
Ohio Northern	7	–	1	8	–	3
Baldwin Wallace	6	–	2	8	–	2
Heidelberg	5	–	3	6	–	4
Muskingum	4	–	4	4	–	6
Marietta	3	–	5	5	–	5
Capital	1	–	7	3	–	7
Wilmington (OH)	1	–	7	3	–	7
Otterbein	1	–	7	1	–	9
$ – Conference champion; ^ – NCAA Division III playoff participant; Rankings from D3Football.com

2025 Old Dominion Athletic Conference football standings
	Conf.			Overall
Team	W		L	W		L
No. 22 Randolph–Macon $^	8	–	0	9	–	2
Shenandoah	6	–	2	8	–	3
Washington and Lee	6	–	2	7	–	4
Hampden–Sydney	5	–	3	7	–	3
Roanoke	3	–	4	5	–	4
Bridgewater	3	–	4	3	–	6
Guilford	1	–	6	2	–	7
Averett	1	–	6	1	–	8
Gallaudet	1	–	7	1	–	8
$ – Conference champion; ^ – NCAA Division III playoff participant

2025 Presidents' Athletic Conference football standings
	Conf.					Overall
Team		W		L			W		L
Washington & Jefferson $^	8	–	0	–	0	8	–	3	–	0
Grove City ^	7	–	1	–	0	8	–	3	–	0
Westminster (PA)	6	–	2	–	0	8	–	3	–	0
Geneva	6	–	2	–	0	6	–	5	–	0
Case Western Reserve	4	–	4	–	0	4	–	5	–	1
Allegheny	4	–	4	–	0	4	–	6	–	0
Waynesburg	4	–	4	–	0	4	–	6	–	0
Hiram	2	–	6	–	0	3	–	7	–	0
Saint Vincent	1	–	7	–	0	2	–	8	–	0
Bethany (WV)	1	–	7	–	0	1	–	9	–	0
Thiel	1	–	7	–	0	1	–	9	–	0
$ – Conference champion; ^ – NCAA Division III playoff participant; Rankings from D3Football.com

2025 Southern Athletic Association football standings
	Conf.			Overall
Team	W		L	W		L
No. 9 Berry $^	7	–	0	11	–	2
No. 16 Trinity (TX) ^	6	–	1	10	–	2
Maryville (TN)	4	–	3	7	–	3
Millsaps	4	–	3	6	–	4
Centre	4	–	3	5	–	5
Southwestern (TX)	2	–	5	4	–	6
Sewanee	1	–	6	3	–	7
Rhodes	0	–	7	1	–	9
$ – Conference champion; ^ – NCAA Division III playoff participant; Rankings from D3Football.com

2025 Southern California Intercollegiate Athletic Conference football standings
	Conf.			Overall
Team	W		L	W		L
Sun Division
Cal Lutheran xy	4	–	4	6	–	4
Redlands	4	–	4	6	–	4
Claremont-Mudd-Scripps	3	–	5	5	–	5
Surf Division
Chapman xy$^	8	–	0	9	–	3
Pomona–Pitzer	4	–	4	5	–	5
La Verne	1	–	7	1	–	8
Championship: Chapman 27, Cal Lutheran 17
$ – Conference champion; x – Division champion/co-champions; y – Championship game participant; ^ – NCAA Division III playoff participant

2025 Southern Collegiate Athletic Conference football standings
	Conf.			Overall
Team	W		L	W		L
Texas Lutheran $	5	–	0	6	–	4
McMurry	4	–	1	6	–	4
Hendrix	3	–	2	6	–	4
Austin	1	–	4	3	–	6
Lyon	1	–	4	2	–	7
Centenary	1	–	4	1	–	8
$ – Conference champion; ^ – NCAA Division III playoff participant

2025 Upper Midwest Athletic Conference football standings
	Conf.			Overall
Team	W		L	W		L
Crown $^	6	–	1	7	–	4
Northwestern (MN)	4	–	3	4	–	6
Martin Luther	3	–	4	5	–	5
Greenville	3	–	4	4	–	5
Minnesota Morris	3	–	4	3	–	7
Westminster (MO)	2	–	5	4	–	6
$ – Conference champion; ^ – NCAA Division III playoff participant

2025 USA South Athletic Conference football standings
	Conf.			Overall
Team	W		L	W		L
LaGrange $^	7	–	0	10	–	2
Belhaven	5	–	2	6	–	4
Huntingdon	5	–	2	6	–	4
Brevard	4	–	3	6	–	4
Southern Virginia	3	–	4	6	–	4
North Carolina Wesleyan	2	–	5	4	–	6
Greensboro	2	–	5	3	–	7
Methodist	0	–	7	1	–	9
$ – Conference champion; ^ – NCAA Division III playoff participant

2025 Wisconsin Intercollegiate Athletic Conference football standings
	Conf.			Overall
Team	W		L	W		L
No. 1 Wisconsin–River Falls $^	6	–	1	14	–	1
No. 10 Wisconsin–Platteville ^	5	–	2	9	–	3
No. 18 Wisconsin–Whitewater ^	5	–	2	8	–	3
No. 8 Wisconsin–La Crosse ^	5	–	2	8	–	3
Wisconsin–Stout	3	–	4	6	–	5
Wisconsin–Oshkosh	3	–	4	5	–	5
Wisconsin–Stevens Point	1	–	6	4	–	6
Wisconsin–Eau Claire	0	–	7	3	–	7
$ – Conference champion; ^ – NCAA Division III playoff participant; Rankings from D3Football.com

2025 NCAA Division III independents football records
	Conf.			Overall
Team	W		L	W		L
Keystone		–		5	–	4

== Postseason ==
=== Teams ===
==== Automatic bids (27) ====
Automatic bids
Conference	School	Record	Appearance	Last
American Rivers	Wartburg	10–0	18th	2024
American Southwest	Hardin–Simmons	9–1	14th	2024
Centennial	Franklin & Marshall	9–1	1st	—
CCIW	North Central (IL)	10–0	17th	2024
Empire 8	Cortland	8–2	14th	2024
HCAC	Hanover	8–2	9th	2019
Landmark	Susquehanna	8–2	7th	2024
Liberty	Union (NY)	8–2	14th	2023
MASCAC	Framingham State	7–3	7th	2021
Michigan	Alma	8–2	6th	2023
Middle Atlantic	Eastern	9–1	1st	—
Midwest	Monmouth (IL)	9–1	8th	2019
Minnesota	Bethel (MN)	10–0	14th	2024
NEWMAC	Springfield	8–2	11th	2024
New England	Endicott	9–1	7th	2024
New Jersey	Christopher Newport	10–0	12th	2023
North Coast	John Carroll	9–1	9th	2024
NACC	Concordia (WI)	9–1	5th	2013
Northwest	Whitworth	8–2	7th	2024
Ohio	Mount Union	10–0	36th	2024
Old Dominion	Randolph–Macon	9–1	8th	2024
Presidents'	Washington & Jefferson	8–2	28th	2024
SAA	Berry	9–1	5th	2024
SCIAC	Chapman	8–2	5th	2023
Upper Midwest	Crown	7–3	1st	—
USA South	LaGrange	9–1	2nd	2008
Wisconsin	Wisconsin–River Falls	9–1	3rd	1996

==== At-large bids (13) ====
At-large bids
School	Conference	Record	Appearance	Last
Johns Hopkins	Centennial	9–1	14th	2024
Trinity (TX)	SAA	9–1	17th	2024
Salisbury	New Jersey	9–1	15th	2024
Wisconsin–Platteville	Wisconsin	8–2	4th	2024
Saint John's (MN)	Minnesota	9–1	30th	2024
Hope	Michigan	9–1	7th	2024
Wisconsin–Whitewater	Wisconsin	8–2	21st	2023
DePauw	North Coast	9–1	7th	2024
Wisconsin–La Crosse	Wisconsin	7–2	16th	2024
Muhlenberg	Centennial	8–2	11th	2021
Wheaton (IL)	CCIW	8–2	7th	2024
Coe	American Rivers	8–2	12th	2024
Grove City	Presidents'	8–2	3rd	2024

=== Bracket ===
First round November 22; Campus sites
*	Muhlenberg	34
Union (NY)	26
*	Framingham State	21
LaGrange	24
*	Hanover	23
Grove City	15
*	Concordia Wisconsin	7
Coe	44
*	Wheaton (IL)	76
Crown	14
*	Whitworth	16
Chapman	18
*	Susquehanna	38
Washington & Jefferson	32
*	Springfield	21
Cortland	7

Second round November 29; Campus sites
*	Mount Union	49
Muhlenberg	7
*	John Carroll	35
Randolph–Macon	6
*	Berry	18
LaGrange	14
*	Trinity (TX)	34
Hardin–Simmons	24
*	North Central (IL)	38
Hanover	6
*	Hope	7
Wisconsin–La Crosse	9
*	Bethel (MN)	51
Coe	26
*	Wisconsin–Platteville	24
Alma	7
*	Wartburg	24
Wheaton (IL)	28
*	Wisconsin–Whitewater	23
DePauw	26
*	Wisconsin–River Falls	58
Chapman	7
*	Saint John's (MN)	49
Monmouth (IL)	15
*	Christopher Newport	28
Susquehanna	42
*	Franklin & Marshall	24
Eastern	28
*	Johns Hopkins	34
Springfield	14
*	Salisbury	35
Endicott	28

Third round December 6 Campus sites
*	Mount Union	7
John Carroll (2OT)	10
*	Berry	31
Trinity (TX)	23
*	North Central (IL)	35
Wisconsin–La Crosse	27
*	Bethel (MN)	35
Wisconsin–Platteville	24
Wheaton (IL)	49
*	DePauw	24
*	Wisconsin–River Falls	42
Saint John's (MN)	14
Susquehanna	29
*	Eastern	0
*	Johns Hopkins	45
Salisbury	13

Quarterfinals; December 13; Campus sites
John Carroll	21
*	Berry	13
*	North Central (IL)	35
Bethel (MN)	21
Wheaton (IL)	21
*	Wisconsin–River Falls	46
Susquehanna	10
*	Johns Hopkins	40

Semifinals; December 20; Campus sites
John Carroll	21
*	North Central (IL)	41
*	Wisconsin–River Falls	48
Johns Hopkins	41

Championship; 2026 Stagg Bowl; January 4, 2026; Tom Benson Hall of Fame Stadium; Canton, Ohio
North Central (IL)	14
Wisconsin–River Falls	24

* - Host team

=== Bowl games ===
Division III held 14 bowl games in 2025, featuring teams that did not qualify for the Division III postseason tournament. This total is up one from the 13 held in 2024, with the return of the Lynah Bowl.

Date	Visiting team	Home team	Site	Result	Attendance	Ref.
November 21	Merchant Marine	Curry	Walter M. Katz Field • Milton, Massachusetts (Fusion Bowl)	27–24	1,000	
November 22	Misericordia	Carnegie Mellon	Gesling Stadium • Pittsburgh, Pennsylvania (Centennial–MAC Bowl Series)	17–24	453	
November 22	Dickinson	Delaware Valley	James Work Memorial Stadium • Doylestown, Pennsylvania (Centennial–MAC Bowl Series)	13–14	721	
November 22	Lebanon Valley	Ursinus	Patterson Field • Collegeville, Pennsylvania (Centennial–MAC Bowl Series)	13–31	987	
November 22	Geneva	Brockport	Bob Boozer Field • Brockport, New York (Whitelaw Bowl)	10–46	1,175	
November 22	RPI	St. John Fisher	Growney Stadium • Pittsford, New York (Chapman Bowl)	35–24	1,181	
November 22	Rowan	Utica	Charles A. Gaetano Stadium • Utica, New York (Bushnell Bowl)	26–20	2,655	
November 22	Hobart	Maritime	Reinhart Field • Throggs Neck, New York (Lynah Bowl)	42–14	1,532	
November 22	Aurora	Illinois College	Raabe Stadium • Wauwatosa, Wisconsin (Lakefront Bowl)	49–14	453	
November 22	Wilkes	Shenandoah	Shentel Stadium • Winchester, Virginia (Cape Henry Bowl)	37–35	2,890	
November 22	Washington & Lee	Lycoming	Girardi Stadium • Williamsport, Pennsylvania (Cape Charles Bowl)	14–12	945	
November 22	Washington University	UW–Stout	Bank of Sun Prairie Stadium • Sun Prairie, Wisconsin (Isthmus Bowl)	23–31	975	
November 22	Ohio Northern	Wabash	Tom Benson Hall of Fame Stadium • Canton, Ohio (ForeverLawn Bowl)	31–32	0	
November 22	Mount St. Joseph	Westminster (PA)	Tom Benson Hall of Fame Stadium • Canton, Ohio (Extra Points Bowl)	21–40	0	
^{#}Rankings from D3football.com poll released prior to the game.

== Coaching changes ==
=== Preseason and in-season ===
This is restricted to coaching changes that took place on or after May 1, 2025, and will include any changes announced after a team's last regularly scheduled games but before its playoff games.

School	Outgoing coach	Date	Reason	Replacement	Previous position
Western Connecticut	Joe Loth	May 6, 2025	Hired as head coach by Southern Connecticut	Kevin Jones (interim)	Western Connecticut defensive coordinator (2018–2024)
Chapman	Bob Owens	May 9, 2025	Retired	Casey Shine (interim; named full-time on March 2, 2026)	Chapman offensive coordinator (2012–2024)
Augsburg	Derrin Lamker	May 21, 2025	Hired as head coach by Osseo HS (MN)	KiJuan Ware	Shippensburg offensive coordinator and quarterbacks coach (2024)
Lawrence	Tony Aker	June 9, 2025	Fired	Adam Gonzaga	Lake Forest defensive coordinator and associate head coach (2024)
Wittenberg	Jim Collins	October 23, 2025	Fired	Joe Nemith (interim)	Wittenberg defensive passing game coordinator & defensive backs coach (2023–2025)
Sewanee	Andy McCollum	November 10, 2025	Fired	Tracy Malone (interim)	Sewanee offensive coordinator & quarterbacks coach (2025)

=== End of season ===
This list includes coaching changes announced during the season that did not take effect until the end of the season.

School	Outgoing coach	Date	Reason	Replacement	Previous position
Geneva	Geno DeMarco	June 30, 2025	Retired (effective at season's end)	Tom Contenta	Geneva defensive coordinator and defensive backs coach
Kalamazoo	Jamie Zorbo	October 29, 2025	Resigned (effective at season's end)	John Krajacic	Kalamazoo co-offensive coordinator and associate head coach (2016–2025)
Averett	Patrick Henry	November 2, 2025	Moved to administrative position (effective at season's end)	Matt Quinn	Scotland HS offensive coordinator (2025)
Nebraska Wesleyan	Brian Keller	November 11, 2025	Retired	Jacob Donohoe	Coe offensive coordinator and quarterbacks coach (2025)
Waynesburg	Cornelius Coleman	November 11, 2025	Fired	Larry Wilson	Clarion offensive coordinator and quarterbacks/wide receivers coach (2025)
Alvernia	Steve Azzanesi	November 16, 2025	Fired	Steve Devlin	Ursinus defensive coordinator and associate head coach (2018–2025)
Knox	Aaron Willits	November 17, 2025	Resigned	Adam Gonzaga	Lawrence head coach (2025)
Bethany (WV)	Brandon Robinson	November 17, 2025	Fired	David Blake	Kent State special teams analyst (2025)
Hamline	Chip Taylor	November 18, 2025	Resigned	Bob Davies	Gustavus Adolphus offensive coordinator and quarterbacks coach (2025)
Gettysburg	Maurice Banks	November 18, 2025	Fired	Michael Green	Hobart defensive coordinator and defensive backs coach (2021–2025)
Loras	Steve Helminiak	November 20, 2025	Fired	Brandon Novak	Saint John's defensive coordinator (2014–2025)
Wittenberg	Joe Nemith (interim)	December 1, 2025	Permanent replacement	BJ Coad	Ohio Dominican associate head coach and offensive coordinator (2024–2025)
Catholic University	Mike Gutelius	December 2, 2025	Moved to administrative position	Kory David	Eastern defensive coordinator and linebackers coach (2024–2025)
Sewanee	Tracy Malone (interim)	December 11, 2025	Permanent replacement hired	Joe Freitag	Monmouth (IL) offensive coordinator and quarterbacks coach (2025)
Lawrence	Adam Gonzaga	December 11, 2025	Fired	Daniel Galante	St. Patrick HS (IL) assistant coach (2021–2025)
Ithaca	Michael Toerper	December 14, 2025	Hired as defensive coordinator by Cornell	Brandon Maguire	Ithaca offensive coordinator (2024–2025)
Marietta	Tom Kaufman	December 15, 2025	Hired as head coach by Saint Ignatius HS (OH)	Tom Hinkle	Marietta associate head coach and defensive line coach (2025)
Susquehanna	Tom Perkovich	December 23, 2025	Hired as head coach by Albany	Chris Pincince	Post wide receivers coach (2025)
John Carroll	Jeff Behrman	January 1, 2026	Hired as head coach by Bucknell	Brian Polian	John Carroll athletic director (2023–present)
Wisconsin–La Crosse	Matt Janus	January 5, 2026	Hired as head coach by Northern Michigan	Michael Zweifel	Wisconsin–La Crosse defensive coordinator and defensive backs coach (2023–2025)
Delaware Valley	Mike Isgro	January 5, 2026	Hired as special teams coordinator by West Chester	Bill Zwaan Jr.	West Chester assistant head coach and offensive coordinator (2013–2025)
Moravian	Jeffrey Long	January 9, 2026	Hired as defensive coordinator by Bucknell	Chris Sapp	Rochester associate head coach/defensive coordinator/defensive backs coach (2018–2025)
Maritime	Anthony Trotta	January 21, 2026	Hired as assistant coach by Bucknell	Andrew Dresner	Holy Cross offensive coordinator and quarterbacks coach (2024–2025)
Eureka	Randy Starks	Before January 26, 2026	Resigned	Dion Jordan	Eureka associate head coach (2024–2025)
William Paterson	Shaun Williams	Before February 10, 2026	Fired	Edwyn Edwards	TCNJ defensive coordinator (2019–2025)
Buffalo State	Lazarus Morgan	Before February 11, 2026	Fired	Mike Neale	Delaware Valley defensive coordinator (2024–2025)
Stevenson	Ed Hottle	February 12, 2026	Resigned	Josh Hoeg	Stevenson associate head coach and offensive coordinator (2019–2025)
Wisconsin–River Falls	Matt Walker	February 22, 2026	Hired as head coach by Drake	Jake Wissing (interim)	Wisconsin–River Falls defensive coordinator (2021–2025)
Westminster (PA)	Scott Benzel	February 23, 2026	Hired as assistant coach by Duke	EJ White (interim)	Westminster (PA) offensive coordinator and quarterbacks coach (2025)

== See also ==
- 2025 NCAA Division I FBS football season
- 2025 NCAA Division I FCS football season
- 2025 NCAA Division II football season
- 2025 NAIA football season
- 2025 U Sports football season
