= 2026 Stagg Bowl =

NCAA Division III college football championship game

2026 NCAA Division III Football Championship
- Stagg Bowl LII
Wisconsin–River Falls Falcons	North Central Cardinals
(13–1)	(14–0)
WIAC	CCIW
24	14
Head coach: Matt Walker	Head coach: Brad Spencer
	1	2	3	4	Total
Wisconsin–River Falls	3	7	7	7	24
North Central	7	7	0	0	14
- Date: January 4, 2026
- Season: 2025
- Stadium: Tom Benson Hall of Fame Stadium
- Location: Canton, Ohio
- MVP: Kaleb Blaha, QB, Wisconsin–River Falls
- Referee: Matt Buche
- Attendance: 2,403

United States TV coverage
- Network: ESPN/ESPN+

The 2026 NCAA Division III Football Championship Game, more commonly referred to as the 2026 Stagg Bowl or Stagg Bowl LII, was a postseason college football game scheduled played on January 4, 2026, at Tom Benson Hall of Fame Stadium in Canton, Ohio. It determined a national champion in NCAA Division III for the 2025 season. The game began at 8:00 p.m. EST, and aired on ESPN and ESPN+. The game featured the two finalists of the 40-team single elimination playoff bracket, Wisconsin–River Falls and North Central; Wisconsin–River Falls won 24–14 to claim their first national championship on their first trip to the Stagg Bowl.

== Teams ==
The participants of the 2026 NCAA Division III Football Championship Game were the finalists of the 2025 Division III Playoffs, a 40-team single elimination brackets tournament which began on November 22. The winners of each of the four 10-team regions qualified for the national semifinals.

=== National semifinals ===
Semifinals; December 20, 2025; Asterisk denotes host
John Carroll	21
*	North Central	41
*	Wisconsin–River Falls	48
Johns Hopkins	41

National Championship; January 4, 2026; Tom Benson Hall of Fame Stadium, Canton, OH
North Central	14
Wisconsin–River Falls	24

== Game summary ==
2026 Stagg Bowl

Quarter	1	2	3	4	Total
Wisconsin–River Falls	3	7	7	7	24
North Central	7	7	0	0	14

at Tom Benson Hall of Fame Stadium • Canton, Ohio

- Date: Sunday, January 4, 2026
- Game time: 8:00 p.m. EST
- Game weather: Clear • Temperature: 26 °F (−3 °C) • Wind: SE at 2 miles per hour (3.2 km/h)
- Game attendance: 2,403
- Referee: Matt Buche
- TV: ESPN/ESPN+

Scoring summary

Quarter	Time	Drive			Team	Scoring information	Score	
Quarter	Time	Plays	Yards	TOP	Team	Scoring information	Wisconsin–River Falls	North Central
1	12:57	4	73	1:57	North Central	Donovan McNeal 48-yard touchdown run, Aidan Ellison kick good	0	7
1	5:48	12	81	4:06	Wisconsin–River Falls	25-yard field goal by Justin Scheberl	3	7
2	11:07	15	73	9:38	North Central	Donovan McNeal 1-yard touchdown run, Aidan Ellison kick good	3	14
2	4:50	8	75	2:44	Wisconsin–River Falls	Blake Rohrer 13-yard touchdown reception from Kaleb Blaha, Justin Scheberl kick good	10	14
3	2:51	7	59	2:32	Wisconsin–River Falls	Kaleb Blaha 7-yard touchdown run, Justin Scheberl kick good	17	14
4	8:44	1	12	0:06	Wisconsin–River Falls	Kaleb Blaha 12-yard touchdown run, Justin Scheberl kick good	24	14
"TOP" = time of possession. For other American football terms, see Glossary of American football.							24	14

== Statistics ==
Team statistical comparison
Statistic	Wisconsin–River Falls	North Central
First downs	25	23
First downs rushing	10	10
First downs passing	14	12
First downs penalty	1	1
Third down efficiency	3–10	7–12
Fourth down efficiency	0–3	0–2
Total plays–net yards	69–436	71–363
Rushing attempts–net yards	28–145	43–169
Yards per rush	5.2	3.9
Yards passing	291	194
Pass completions–attempts	27–41	18–28
Interceptions thrown	0	2
Punt returns–total yards	1–2	1–11
Kickoff returns–total yards	3–36	5–67
Punts–average yardage	2–37	3–39
Fumbles–lost	0–0	1–1
Penalties–yards	3–35	4–27
Time of possession	23:45	36:15

Wisconsin–River Falls statistics
Falcons passing
	C–A	Yds	TD–INT
Kaleb Blaha	27–41	291	1–0
Falcons rushing
	Car	Yds	TD
Kaleb Blaha	19	128	2
Trevor Asher	5	24	0
Jaylen Reed	2	1	0
TEAM	2	-8	0
Falcons receiving
	Rec	Yds	TD
Jake Hilton	4	85	0
Austin Rush	6	64	0
Blake Rohrer	4	50	1
Adam Johnstone	6	40	0
Trevor Asher	3	23	0
Jaylen Reed	2	13	0
Ben Wesolowski	1	12	0
Stephen Reifenberger	1	4	0

North Central statistics
Cardinals passing
	C–A	Yds	TD–INT
Garret Wilson	18–28	194	0–2
Cardinals rushing
	Car	Yds	TD
Donovan McNeal	23	133	2
Jordan Williams	10	44	0
Sean Allen	1	5	0
Thomas Skokna	1	0	0
Garret Wilson	8	-13	0
Cardinals receiving
	Rec	Yds	TD
Thomas Skokna	5	77	0
Jack Rummell	5	75	0
Grant McAtee	3	27	0
Demir Ashiru	2	8	0
Myles Walton	2	6	0
Donovan McNeal	1	1	0
