= 1999 NCAA Division III football season =

American college football season

- Regular season: August – November 1999
- Playoffs: November – December 1999
- National championship: Salem Football Stadium; Salem, VA
- Champion: Pacific Lutheran
- Gagliardi Trophy: Danny Ragsdale (QB), Redlands

The 1999 NCAA Division III football season, part of the college football season organized by the NCAA at the Division III level in the United States, began in August 1999, and concluded with the NCAA Division III Football Championship, also known as the Stagg Bowl, in December 1999 at Salem Football Stadium in Salem, Virginia.

The Pacific Lutheran Lutes won their first Division III championship by defeating the Rowan Profs, 42−13. The Lutes were led by All-American quarterback Chad Johnson, running back Anthony Hicks and offensive lineman Andrew Finstuen. College Football Hall of Fame coach Frosty Westering won his fourth national championship.

The Gagliardi Trophy, given to the most outstanding player in Division III football, was awarded to Danny Ragsdale, quarterback from Redlands.

== Conference standings ==
1999 American Southwest Conference football standings
	Conf.			Overall
Team	W		L	W		L
Hardin–Simmons $^	7	–	0	12	–	1
McMurry	6	–	1	7	–	2
Howard Payne	4	–	3	5	–	5
Mississippi College	3	–	4	6	–	4
Mary Hardin–Baylor	3	–	4	4	–	6
Austin	2	–	5	3	–	7
Texas Lutheran	2	–	5	3	–	7
Sul Ross	1	–	6	2	–	8
$ – Conference champion; ^ – NCAA Division III playoff participant

1999 Atlantic Central Football Conference standings
	Conf.			Overall
Team	W		L	W		L
Frostburg State $	5	–	1	8	–	3
Ferrum	4	–	2	6	–	4
Wesley	4	–	2	6	–	4
Chowan	2	–	4	5	–	4
Greensboro	2	–	4	3	–	6
Methodist	2	–	4	3	–	7
Salisbury State	2	–	4	2	–	7
$ – Conference champion

1999 Centennial Conference football standings
	Conf.			Overall
Team	W		L	W		L
Western Maryland $^	7	–	0	11	–	1
Ursinus ^	6	–	1	10	–	2
Dickinson	4	–	3	6	–	4
Muhlenberg	4	–	3	6	–	4
Johns Hopkins	3	–	4	4	–	6
Gettysburg	2	–	5	3	–	7
Franklin & Marshall	1	–	6	2	–	8
Swarthmore	0	–	7	1	–	8
$ – Conference champion; ^ – NCAA Division III playoff participant

1999 College Conference of Illinois and Wisconsin football standings
	Conf.			Overall
Team	W		L	W		L
Augustana (IL) $^	6	–	1	9	–	2
Millikin	5	–	2	7	–	2
Wheaton (IL)	5	–	2	7	–	2
Illinois Wesleyan	4	–	3	6	–	3
Carthage	4	–	3	5	–	4
North Central (IL)	2	–	5	2	–	7
Elmhurst	1	–	6	2	–	7
North Park	1	–	6	2	–	7
$ – Conference champion; ^ – NCAA Division III playoff participant

1999 Freedom Football Conference standings
	Conf.			Overall
Team	W		L	W		L
Western Connecticut $^	6	–	0	10	–	1
Plymouth State	4	–	2	8	–	3
Springfield (MA)	4	–	2	4	–	6
WPI	3	–	3	5	–	4
Merchant Marine	2	–	4	3	–	7
Norwich	1	–	5	4	–	6
Coast Guard	1	–	5	1	–	9
$ – Conference champion; ^ – NCAA Division III playoff participant

1999 Heartland Collegiate Athletic Conference football standings
	Conf.			Overall
Team	W		L	W		L
Hanover $^	7	–	0	10	–	1
Wilmington (OH)	6	–	1	9	–	1
Wabash	5	–	2	5	–	5
Bluffton	4	–	3	7	–	3
Franklin (IN)	2	–	5	4	–	6
Manchester	2	–	5	3	–	7
Anderson (IN)	2	–	5	2	–	8
Mount St. Joseph	0	–	7	2	–	8
$ – Conference champion; ^ – NCAA Division III playoff participant

1999 Illini–Badger Football Conference standings
	Conf.			Overall
Team	W		L	W		L
Aurora $	7	–	0	8	–	2
MacMurray	4	–	3	6	–	4
Concordia (WI)	4	–	3	5	–	5
Lakeland	4	–	3	5	–	5
Benedictine (IL)	3	–	4	6	–	4
Greenville	3	–	4	5	–	5
Eureka	3	–	4	4	–	6
Concordia (IL)	0	–	7	2	–	8
$ – Conference champion

1999 Iowa Conference football standings
	Conf.			Overall
Team	W		L	W		L
Wartburg $^	10	–	0	10	–	1
Central (IA) ^	9	–	1	10	–	2
Buena Vista	7	–	3	7	–	3
Simpson (IA)	6	–	4	6	–	4
Upper Iowa	6	–	4	6	–	4
Coe	4	–	6	4	–	6
Loras	4	–	6	4	–	6
William Penn	3	–	7	3	–	7
Cornell (IA)	3	–	7	3	–	7
Luther	2	–	8	2	–	8
Dubuque	1	–	8	1	–	9
$ – Conference champion; ^ – NCAA Division III playoff participant

1999 Michigan Intercollegiate Athletic Association football standings
	Conf.			Overall
Team	W		L	W		L
Alma +^	5	–	1	8	–	2
Albion +	5	–	1	6	–	3
Hope +	5	–	1	5	–	4
Defiance	3	–	3	4	–	5
Kalamazoo	2	–	4	3	–	6
Adrian	1	–	5	2	–	7
Olivet	0	–	6	0	–	9
+ – Conference co-champions; ^ – NCAA Division III playoff participant

1999 Middle Atlantic Conference football standings
	Conf.			Overall
Team	W		L	W		L
Commonwealth
Susquehanna x	4	–	1	7	–	3
Juniata	3	–	2	6	–	4
Widener	3	–	2	6	–	4
Albright	2	–	3	3	–	7
Lebanon Valley	2	–	3	2	–	8
Moravian	1	–	4	2	–	8
Freedom
Lycoming x^	4	–	0	9	–	1
Wilkes	3	–	1	7	–	4
Fairleigh Dickinson–Florham	2	–	2	5	–	5
King's (PA)	1	–	3	5	–	5
Delaware Valley	0	–	4	2	–	8
x – Division champion/co-champions; ^ – NCAA Division III playoff participant

1999 Midwest Conference football standings
	Conf.			Overall
Team	W		L	W		L
St. Norbert $^	9	–	0	9	–	2
Grinnell	7	–	2	7	–	3
Beloit	6	–	3	7	–	3
Ripon	6	–	3	6	–	4
Carroll (WI)	4	–	5	5	–	5
Lake Forest	4	–	5	5	–	5
Lawrence	3	–	6	3	–	7
Knox	2	–	7	3	–	7
Illinois College	2	–	7	2	–	8
Monmouth (IL)	2	–	7	2	–	8
$ – Conference champion; ^ – NCAA Division III playoff participant

1999 Minnesota Intercollegiate Athletic Conference football standings
	Conf.					Overall
Team	W		L		T	W		L		T
Saint John's (MN) $^	8	–	1	–	0	11	–	2	–	0
Bethel (MN)	7	–	2	–	0	8	–	2	–	0
St. Thomas (MN)	7	–	2	–	0	7	–	3	–	0
Gustavus Adolphus	6	–	3	–	0	7	–	3	–	0
Concordia–Moorhead	6	–	3	–	0	6	–	4	–	0
Augsburg	5	–	4	–	0	6	–	4	–	0
St. Olaf	3	–	6	–	0	3	–	7	–	0
Carleton	1	–	8	–	0	2	–	8	–	0
Hamline	1	–	8	–	0	2	–	8	–	0
Macalester	1	–	8	–	0	2	–	8	–	0
$ – Conference champion; ^ – NCAA Division III playoff participant

1999 New England Football Conference standings
	Conf.			Overall
Team	W		L	W		L
Blue Division
Salve Regina x	6	–	0	8	–	3
Curry	5	–	1	7	–	3
MIT	4	–	2	6	–	4
Nichols	3	–	3	6	–	3
UMass Dartmouth	2	–	4	3	–	7
UMass–Boston	1	–	5	1	–	9
Western New England	0	–	6	2	–	7
Red Division
Bridgewater State x^	6	–	0	10	–	1
Massachusetts Maritime	5	–	1	8	–	2
Fitchburg State	4	–	2	6	–	4
Westfield State	3	–	3	4	–	6
Maine Maritime	2	–	4	3	–	6
Worcester State	1	–	6	1	–	9
Framingham State	0	–	6	2	–	8
x – Division champion/co-champions; ^ – NCAA Division III playoff participant

1999 New England Small College Athletic Conference football standings
	Conf.			Overall
Team	W		L	W		L
Williams	7	–	1	7	–	1
Middlebury	6	–	2	6	–	2
Amherst	5	–	3	5	–	3
Trinity (CT)	5	–	3	5	–	3
Wesleyan	5	–	3	5	–	3
Bates	4	–	4	4	–	4
Tufts	4	–	4	4	–	4
Colby	3	–	5	3	–	5
Bowdoin	1	–	7	1	–	7
Hamilton	0	–	8	0	–	8
No conference champion recognized

1999 New Jersey Athletic Conference football standings
	Conf.			Overall
Team	W		L	W		L
Montclair State $^	5	–	0	9	–	2
Rowan ^	4	–	1	12	–	2
TCNJ	3	–	2	4	–	5
New Jersey City	2	–	3	3	–	7
William Paterson	1	–	4	2	–	8
Kean	0	–	5	0	–	9
$ – Conference champion; ^ – NCAA Division III playoff participant

1999 North Coast Athletic Conference football standings
	Conf.			Overall
Team	W		L	W		L
Wittenberg $^	6	–	0	11	–	1
Allegheny	4	–	2	8	–	2
Ohio Wesleyan	4	–	2	8	–	2
Wooster	4	–	2	8	–	2
Denison	2	–	4	4	–	6
Earlham	1	–	6	2	–	8
Kenyon	0	–	6	1	–	9
Wabash	0	–	0	5	–	5
Hiram	0	–	0	0	–	10
Oberlin	0	–	0	0	–	10
$ – Conference champion; ^ – NCAA Division III playoff participant

1999 Northwest Conference football standings
	Conf.			Overall
Team	W		L	W		L
Willamette $^	5	–	0	7	–	4
Pacific Lutheran ^	4	–	1	13	–	1
Linfield	3	–	2	6	–	3
Whitworth	2	–	3	5	–	5
Puget Sound	1	–	4	1	–	8
Lewis & Clark	0	–	5	0	–	9
$ – Conference champion; ^ – NCAA Division III playoff participant

1999 Ohio Athletic Conference football standings
	Conf.			Overall
Team	W		L	W		L
Mount Union $^	9	–	0	12	–	1
Ohio Northern ^	8	–	1	11	–	2
John Carroll	6	–	3	7	–	3
Otterbein	6	–	3	7	–	3
Baldwin–Wallace	6	–	3	6	–	4
Heidelberg	4	–	5	4	–	6
Muskingum	2	–	7	3	–	7
Capital	2	–	7	2	–	8
Marietta	2	–	7	2	–	8
Hiram	0	–	9	0	–	10
$ – Conference champion; ^ – NCAA Division III playoff participant

1999 Old Dominion Athletic Conference football standings
	Conf.			Overall
Team	W		L	W		L
Catholic University $^	6	–	0	9	–	2
Emory & Henry	4	–	2	6	–	4
Randolph–Macon	4	–	2	5	–	5
Bridgewater	3	–	3	5	–	5
Washington and Lee	3	–	3	5	–	5
Guilford	2	–	4	4	–	6
Hampden–Sydney	0	–	6	1	–	9
$ – Conference champion; ^ – NCAA Division III playoff participant; Catholic University's win over Salisbury State and Washington and Lee's win over Centre counted in the conference standings.

1999 Presidents' Athletic Conference football standings
	Conf.			Overall
Team	W		L	W		L
Washington & Jefferson $^	4	–	0	9	–	3
Grove City	3	–	1	6	–	4
Waynesburg	2	–	2	5	–	4
Bethany (WV)	1	–	3	4	–	6
Thiel	0	–	4	3	–	7
$ – Conference champion; ^ – NCAA Division III playoff participant

1999 Southern California Intercollegiate Athletic Conference football standings
	Conf.			Overall
Team	W		L	W		L
Redlands $	5	–	0	7	–	2
La Verne	4	–	1	7	–	2
Cal Lutheran	3	–	2	3	–	6
Claremont-Mudd	2	–	3	5	–	4
Occidental	1	–	4	2	–	7
Whittier	0	–	5	0	–	9
$ – Conference champion

1999 Southern Collegiate Athletic Conference football standings
	Conf.			Overall
Team	W		L	W		L
Trinity (TX) $^	6	–	0	12	–	1
Rhodes	4	–	2	6	–	3
Sewanee	4	–	2	6	–	4
Centre	3	–	3	5	–	5
DePauw	3	–	3	5	–	5
Millsaps	1	–	5	2	–	8
Rose–Hulman	0	–	6	2	–	8
$ – Conference champion; ^ – NCAA Division III playoff participant

1999 St. Louis Intercollegiate Athletic Conference football standings
	Conf.			Overall
Team	W		L	W		L
Westminster (MO) +	2	–	1	8	–	2
MacMurray +	2	–	1	6	–	4
Greenville +	2	–	1	5	–	5
Blackburn	0	–	3	2	–	8
+ – Conference co-champions

1999 Upstate Collegiate Athletic Association football standings
	Conf.			Overall
Team	W		L	W		L
RPI $^	4	–	0	9	–	1
Union (NY)	3	–	1	9	–	2
Hobart	2	–	2	5	–	4
Rochester (NY)	1	–	3	3	–	6
St. Lawrence	0	–	4	0	–	10
$ – Conference champion; ^ – NCAA Division III playoff participant

1999 Wisconsin Intercollegiate Athletic Conference football standings
	Conf.			Overall
Team	W		L	W		L
Wisconsin–Stevens Point +^	6	–	1	9	–	2
Wisconsin–La Crosse +^	6	–	1	7	–	4
Wisconsin–River Falls	5	–	2	6	–	4
Wisconsin–Platteville	3	–	4	5	–	5
Wisconsin–Whitewater	3	–	4	3	–	7
Wisconsin–Oshkosh	2	–	5	3	–	7
Wisconsin–Eau Claire	2	–	5	2	–	8
Wisconsin–Stout	1	–	6	2	–	8
+ – Conference co-champions; ^ – NCAA Division III playoff participant

1999 NCAA Division III independents football records
	Conf.			Overall
Team	W		L	W		L
Pomona-Pitzer		–		7	–	1
Westminster (MO)		–		8	–	2
Buffalo State		–		7	–	3
Maryville (TN)		–		7	–	3
Thomas More		–		7	–	3
Ithaca		–		7	–	4
Alfred		–		6	–	4
Brockport		–		6	–	4
Hartwick		–		6	–	4
Eastern Oregon		–		5	–	5
Chapman		–		5	–	4
Cortland		–		5	–	5
Menlo		–		4	–	5
Mount Ida		–		3	–	4
Principia		–		3	–	5
Stillman		–		3	–	6
Maranatha Baptist		–		2	–	6
Colorado College		–		2	–	7
St. John Fisher		–		1	–	8

== Conference champions ==
Conference champions
- American Southwest Conference – Hardin–Simmons
- Atlantic Central Football Conference – Frostburg State
- Centennial Conference – Western Maryland
- College Conference of Illinois and Wisconsin – Augustana (IL)
- Freedom Football Conference – Western Connecticut State
- Heartland Collegiate Athletic Conference – Hanover
- Illini-Badger Football Conference – Aurora
- Iowa Intercollegiate Athletic Conference – Wartburg
- Michigan Intercollegiate Athletic Association – Albion, Alma, and Hope
- Middle Atlantic Conference – Lycoming
- Midwest Conference – St. Norbert
- Minnesota Intercollegiate Athletic Conference – Saint John's (MN)
- New England Football Conference – Salve Regina (Blue Division), Bridgewater State (Red Division)
- New Jersey Athletic Conference – Montclair State
- North Coast Athletic Conference – Wittenberg
- Northwest Conference – Willamette
- Ohio Athletic Conference – Mount Union
- Old Dominion Athletic Conference – Catholic
- Presidents' Athletic Conference – Washington & Jefferson
- Southern California Intercollegiate Athletic Conference – Redlands
- Southern Collegiate Athletic Conference – Trinity (TX)
- University Athletic Association – Washington–Saint Louis
- Upper Midwest Athletic Conference – Mount Senario
- Upstate Collegiate Athletic Conference – RPI
- Wisconsin Intercollegiate Athletic Conference – Wisconsin–La Crosse and Wisconsin–Stevens Point

== Postseason ==
The 1999 NCAA Division III Football Championship playoffs were the 27th annual single-elimination tournament to determine the national champion of men's NCAA Division III college football. The championship Stagg Bowl game was held at Salem Football Stadium in Salem, Virginia for the seventh time. This was the first bracket to feature 28 teams after expanding from the previous format of 16 teams in place from 1985 to 1998. With the new format, four teams were given byes to the second round.

=== Playoff bracket ===
First Round; Campus Sites
Augustana (IL)	39
St. Norbert	32
Ohio Northern	56
Hanover	14
Wittenberg	42
Alma	19
Montclair State	37
Buffalo State	34
Rowan	29
RPI	10
Ursinus	43
Bridgewater State	38
Pacific Lutheran	28
Willamette	24
Central (IA)	38
UW–La Crosse	17
Saint John's (MN)	23
UW–Stevens Point	10
Western Maryland	20
Catholic University	16
Hardin–Simmons	28
Washington (MO)	21
Wash. & Jefferson	14
Lycoming	7

Second Round; Campus Sites
Mount Union	42
Augustana (IL)	33
Ohio Northern	58
Wittenberg	24
West. Conn. State	24
Montclair State	32
Rowan	55
Ursinus	0
Wartburg	14
Pacific Lutheran	49
Central (IA)	9
Saint John's (MN)	10
Trinity (TX)	20
McDaniel	16
Hardin–Simmons	51
Wash. & Jefferson	3

Quarterfinals; Campus Sites
Mount Union	56
Ohio Northern	31
Montclair State	13
Rowan	42
Pacific Lutheran	19
Saint John's (MN)	9
Trinity (TX)	40
Hardin–Simmons	33

Semifinals; Campus Sites
Mount Union	17
Rowan	24*
Pacific Lutheran	49
Trinity (TX)	28

National Championship Game; Salem Football Stadium; Salem, Virginia
Rowan	13
Pacific Lutheran	42

* Overtime

== Final AFCA Top 25 Poll ==
Team	Final Record	Points
1. Pacific Lutheran (45)	13-1	1,125
2. Rowan	12–1	1,074
3. Mount Union	12–1	1,035
4. Trinity(TX)	12–1	990
5. Ohion Northern	11–2	870
6. Hardin-Simmons	12–1	859
7. St. John's	11–2	809
8. Montclair State	9–2	752
9. Western Maryland	11–1	750
10. Wittenberg	11–1	717
11. Central(IA)	10–2	617
12. Wartburg	10–1	582
13. Augustana	9–2	526
14. Western Connecticut	10–1	510
15. Lycoming	9–1	473
16. Washington & Jefferson	9–3	400
17. Hanover	10–1	377
18. Catholic	9–2	364
19. Wisconsin-Stevens Point	9–2	356
20. Rensselaer	9–1	256
21. Ursinus	10–2	249
22. St. Norbert	9–2	183
23. Bridgewater State	10–1	139
24. Willamette	7–4	132
25. Wisconsin-La Crosse	7–4	124

Others receiving votes: Buffalo St 118, Alma 109, Washington (Mo.) 85, Wilmington 13, McMurry 9, Redlands 9, Union 9, Pomona-Pitzer 5, Aurora 5, Millikin 4, Williams 3, John Carroll 3, Otterbein 1.

== Awards ==
Gagliardi Trophy: Danny Ragsdale, Redlands

AFCA Coach of the Year: Larry Kehres, Mount Union

AFCA Regional Coach of the Year: Region 1: Peter Mazzaferro, Bridgewater State Region 2: Frank Girardi, Lycoming Region 3: Steve Mohr, Trinity (TX) Region 4: Larry Kehres, Mount Union Region 5: Rick Willis, Wartburg

== 1999 All-American Team ==
=== Offense ===
==== Quarterback ====
- Mike Burton, Trinity(TX) (AFCA, D3)
- Justin Peery, Westminster (FG)

==== Running Back ====
- R.J. Bowers, Grove City (AFCA, APL, D3, FG(as Fullback))
- Casey Donaldson, Wittenberg (AFCA, FG)
- Jamal Robertson, Ohio Northern (FG)
- Paul Smith, Gettysburg (D3)

==== Wide Receiver ====
- Matt Perceval, Wesleyan (AFCA)
- Steve Vagedes, Ohio Northern (AFCA)
- Sean Eaton, Randolph-Macon (AFCA, D3)
- Scott Pingel, Westminster (APL, D3, FG)
- Matt Eisenberg, Juniata (FG)

==== Tight End ====
- Jeff Irne, Ithaca (D3)
- Jeff Pedersen, Grinnell College (FG)

==== Offensive Line ====
- Gary Gutierrez, Hardin-Simmons (AFCA, APL, FG)
- Chico Rowland, Bethel(MN) (AFCA, D3)
- Anthony Weigleb, Hanover (AFCA)
- Antonio Crook, Sewanee (AFCA)
- Sean McCullin, Wesley (AFCA)
- MacKenzie Hay, Augustana (D3)
- Jarryn Avery, Rowan (D3,FG)
- Tom Bauer, Mount Union (D3, FG)
- David Coney, Trinity(TX) (D3,FG)
- Kory Allen, Ohio Northern (FG)

=== Defense ===
==== Defensive Line ====
- Joe Green, Wisconsin-River Falls (AFCA)
- Brock Ryan, Wisconsin-La Crosse (AFCA)
- Cameron Coleman, Lycoming (AFCA)
- Tim Runnalls, Washington(MO) (AFCA, APL, FG)
- Justin Harris, Alma (D3)
- Keith Fischer, Dickinson (D3)
- David Monaghan, Allegheny (D3)
- Anthony Souhrada, Wartburg (D3)
- Greg Boucher, Western Connecticut State (FG)
- Jeramy Benson (FG)
- Cornelius White, Rowan (FG)

==== Linebacker ====
- Jon Crumley, Buffalo State (AFCA, D3)
- John Gavlick, Rowan (AFCA, APL, D3, FG)
- Seth Duerr, Wooster (AFCA)
- Brian Hee, Catholic (AFCA)
- Dan Philips, Chicago (D3)
- Ryan Deck, Trinity(TX) (FG)
- Brandon Novak, St John's (FG)
- Tom Eisenhower, Widener (FG)

==== Defensive Back ====
- Charles Peterson, Emory & Henry (AFCA, D3)
- Zak Gordon, Coe (AFCA)
- Tom Rini, John Carroll (AFCA)
- Clinton Tabb, Rowan (D3)
- Marvin Deal, Western Maryland (D3)
- Mike Fowler, Ohio Wesleyan (D3)
- Antonio Nash, Susquehanna (FG)
- Jeremy Presar, Ohio Northern (FG)
- Chris Swartz, RPI (FG)
- Andy Palzkill, Wisconsin-Stevens Point (FG)

=== Special Teams ===
==== Kicker ====
- Ryan Geisler, California Lutheran (AFCA)
- Chris Baughman, Wheaton (D3, FG)

==== Punter ====
- Phil Barry, St. John's (AFCA, D3)
- Steve Vagedes, Ohio Northern (FG)

==== Return Specialist ====
- Paul Smith, Gettysburg (AFCA)
- Joshua Carter, Muhlenberg (D3, FG)

== See also ==
- 1999 NCAA Division I-A football season
- 1999 NCAA Division I-AA football season
- 1999 NCAA Division II football season
