= 2025 Wisconsin–River Falls Falcons football team =

American college football season

2025 Wisconsin–River Falls Falcons football

NCAA Division III national champion WIAC champion

Stagg Bowl, W 24–14 vs. North Central
- Conference: Wisconsin Intercollegiate Athletic Conference

Ranking
- AFCA: No. 1
- D3Football.com: No. 1
- Record: 14–1 (6–1 WIAC)
- Head coach: Matt Walker (14th season)
- Offensive coordinator: Joe Matheson (7th season)
- Offensive scheme: Top Gun
- Defensive coordinator: Jake Wissing (5th season)
- Base defense: Multiple
- Home stadium: Ramer Field

2025 Wisconsin Intercollegiate Athletic Conference football standings
	Conf.			Overall
Team	W		L	W		L
No. 1 Wisconsin–River Falls $^	6	–	1	14	–	1
No. 10 Wisconsin–Platteville ^	5	–	2	9	–	3
No. 18 Wisconsin–Whitewater ^	5	–	2	8	–	3
No. 8 Wisconsin–La Crosse ^	5	–	2	8	–	3
Wisconsin–Stout	3	–	4	6	–	5
Wisconsin–Oshkosh	3	–	4	5	–	5
Wisconsin–Stevens Point	1	–	6	4	–	6
Wisconsin–Eau Claire	0	–	7	3	–	7
$ – Conference champion; ^ – NCAA Division III playoff participant; Rankings from D3Football.com

The 2025 Wisconsin–River Falls Falcons football team was an American football team that represented University of Wisconsin–River Falls of River Falls, Wisconsin, as a member of the Wisconsin Intercollegiate Athletic Conference (WIAC) during the 2025 NCAA Division III football season. In their fourteenth year under head coach Matt Walker, the Falcons compiled a 14–1 record (6–1 in conference games), won the WIAC championship, and were ranked No. 3 in Division III at the end of the regular season.

The team advanced to the Division III playoffs for the first time since 1996, defeating Chapman in the second round, Saint John's (MN) in the third round, Wheaton (IL) in the quarterfinals, Johns Hopkins in the semifinals, and North Central (IL) in the Stagg Bowl to win the first national championship in program history.

On offense, the Falcons were led by senior quarterback Kaleb Blaha, who finished the season with 6,189 individual yards, breaking the NCAA record across all divisions previously set by LSU quarterback Joe Burrow in 2019. Blaha broke several single-season records for the Falcons, including pass completions, passing yards, and passing touchdowns, while also becoming the program's all-time leader in passing yards and total touchdowns. Blaha won the Gagliardi Trophy, awarded to the best player in NCAA Division III football.

== Schedule ==
Date	Time	Opponent	Rank	Site	Result	Attendance	Source
September 6	1:00 p.m.	Alma*	No. 19	Ramer Field; River Falls, WI	W 45–33	1,684	
September 13	2:00 p.m.	Coe*	No. 13	Ramer Field; River Falls, WI	W 59–47	1,581	
September 20	12:30 p.m.	at Belhaven*	No. 12	Belhaven Bowl; Jackson, MS	W 65–0	1,789	
October 4	2:05 p.m.	at No. 15 Wisconsin–Oshkosh	No. 11	Titan Stadium; Oshkosh, WI	L 17–21	1,692	
October 11	2:05 p.m.	No. 6 Wisconsin–Platteville^{†}	No. 14	Ramer Field; River Falls, WI	W 31–21	3,106	
October 18	2:05 p.m.	at Wisconsin–Stevens Point	No. 12	Goerke Field; Stevens Point, WI	W 52–7	2,488	
October 25	2:05 p.m.	at Wisconsin–Eau Claire	No. 10	Carson Park; Eau Claire, WI	W 73–21	2,852	
November 1	2:05 p.m.	No. 8 Wisconsin–Whitewater	No. 9	Ramer Field; River Falls, WI	W 52–14	1,811	
November 8	2:05 p.m.	No. 9 Wisconsin–La Crosse	No. 8	Ramer Field; River Falls, WI	W 41–7	2,255	
November 15	2:05 p.m.	at Wisconsin–Stout	No. 4	Don and Nona Williams Stadium; Menomonie, WI	W 29–19	3,249	
November 29	1:00 p.m.	Chapman*	No. 3	Ramer Field; River Falls, WI (NCAA Division III Second Round)	W 58–7	2,006	
December 6	12:55 p.m.	No. 7 Saint John's (MN)*	No. 3	Ramer Field; River Falls, WI (NCAA Division III Third Round)	W 42–14	3,205	
December 13	3:00 p.m.	No. 19 Wheaton (IL)*	No. 3	Ramer Field; River Falls, WI (NCAA Division III Quarterfinal)	W 46–21	1,849	
December 20	1:00 p.m.	No. 8 Johns Hopkins*	No. 3	Ramer Field; River Falls, WI (NCAA Division III Semifinal)	W 48–41	2,897	
January 4, 2026	8:00 p.m.	vs. No. 1 North Central (IL)*	No. 3	Tom Benson Hall of Fame Stadium; Canton, OH (Stagg Bowl)	W 24–14	2,403	
*Non-conference game; ^{†}Homecoming; Rankings from D3Football.com Poll released prior to the game; All times are in Eastern time

== Rankings ==
Ranking movements Legend: ██ Increase in ranking ██ Decrease in ranking ( ) = First-place votes
	Week												
Poll	Pre	1	2	3	4	5	6	7	8	9	10	11	Final
D3football.com	19	13	12	11	11	14	12	10	9	8	4	3	1 (25)
AFCA	19	14	13	12	12	17	12	10	9	8	5	4	1 (51)

== WIAC preseason poll ==
The WIAC released its preseason coaches' prediction poll on August 21, 2025. The Falcons were predicted to finish third in the conference.

== Game summaries ==
=== Alma ===
	1	2	3	4	Total
Scots	6	0	14	13	33
No. 19 Falcons	7	17	14	7	45

Statistics	ALM	WRF
First downs	26	28
Total yards	449	561
Rushing yards	207	118
Passing yards	242	443
Turnovers	3	2
Time of possession	27:45	32:15

Team	Category	Player	Statistics
Alma	Passing	Carter St. John	22/42, 242 yards, 2 TD, INT
Alma	Rushing	Eddie Williams	28 rushes, 142 yards, 2 TD
Alma	Receiving	Zach Poff	6 receptions, 95 yards, TD
Wisconsin–River Falls	Passing	Kaleb Blaha	28/47, 443 yards, 5 TD, INT
Wisconsin–River Falls	Rushing	Trevor Asher	22 rushes, 65 yards
Wisconsin–River Falls	Receiving	Stephen Reifenberger	5 receptions, 185 yards, 3 TD

=== Coe ===
	1	2	3	4	Total
Kohawks	0	14	21	12	47
No. 13 Falcons	21	7	10	21	59

Statistics	COE	WRF
First downs	33	38
Total yards	643	733
Rushing yards	124	394
Passing yards	519	339
Turnovers	0	0
Time of possession	25:00	35:00

Team	Category	Player	Statistics
Coe	Passing	Brady Kelly	32/45, 519 yards, 6 TD
Coe	Rushing	Brady Kelly	11 rushes, 108 yards
Coe	Receiving	Jeron Senters	11 receptions, 133 yards, 2 TD
Wisconsin–River Falls	Passing	Kaleb Blaha	30/38, 335 yards, 2 TD
Wisconsin–River Falls	Rushing	Kaleb Blaha	27 rushes, 234 yards, 2 TD
Wisconsin–River Falls	Receiving	Blake Rohrer	6 receptions, 110 yards, TD

=== At Belhaven ===
	1	2	3	4	Total
No. 12 Falcons	7	28	16	14	65
Blazers	0	0	0	0	0

Statistics	WRF	BEL
First downs	39	7
Total yards	615	123
Rushing yards	274	35
Passing yards	341	88
Turnovers	0	5
Time of possession	33:15	26:45

Team	Category	Player	Statistics
Wisconsin–River Falls	Passing	Kaleb Blaha	23/33, 268 yards, 3 TD
Wisconsin–River Falls	Rushing	Cade Fitzgerald	16 rushes, 95 yards, TD
Wisconsin–River Falls	Receiving	Jonah Mallberg	4 receptions, 51 yards
Belhaven	Passing	Jack Crawford	9/17, 67 yards, 2 INT
Belhaven	Rushing	Clayton Mains	4 rushes, 22 yards
Belhaven	Receiving	R. J. Garrison	5 receptions, 25 yards

=== At No. 15 Wisconsin–Oshkosh ===
	1	2	3	4	Total
No. 11 Falcons	0	7	3	7	17
No. 15 Titans	0	14	0	7	21

Statistics	WRF	UWO
First downs	27	15
Total yards	416	335
Rushing yards	213	168
Passing yards	203	167
Turnovers	3	0
Time of possession	31:25	28:35

Team	Category	Player	Statistics
Wisconsin–River Falls	Passing	Kaleb Blaha	29/47, 203 yards, 2 INT
Wisconsin–River Falls	Rushing	Kaleb Blaha	24 rushes, 128 yards, 2 TD
Wisconsin–River Falls	Receiving	Jonah Mallberg	6 receptions, 62 yards
Wisconsin–Oshkosh	Passing	Quentin Keene	14/27, 167 yards, TD
Wisconsin–Oshkosh	Rushing	Ben Vallafskey	17 rushes, 114 yards, 2 TD
Wisconsin–Oshkosh	Receiving	Londyn Little	4 receptions, 60 yards

=== No. 6 Wisconsin–Platteville ===
	1	2	3	4	Total
No. 6 Pioneers	0	7	7	7	21
No. 14 Falcons	14	10	7	0	31

Statistics	UWP	WRF
First downs	19	33
Total yards	323	631
Rushing yards	38	155
Passing yards	285	476
Turnovers	4	4
Time of possession	27:30	32:30

Team	Category	Player	Statistics
Wisconsin–Platteville	Passing	Caden Casimino	14/22, 145 yards, TD, INT
Wisconsin–Platteville	Rushing	Caden Casimino	5 rushes, 26 yards
Wisconsin–Platteville	Receiving	Trevor Syse	9 receptions, 141 yards, TD
Wisconsin–River Falls	Passing	Kaleb Blaha	35/53, 443 yards, TD, INT
Wisconsin–River Falls	Rushing	Jaylen Reed	2 rushes, 65 yards, TD
Wisconsin–River Falls	Receiving	Blake Rohrer	4 receptions, 167 yards, TD

=== At Wisconsin–Stevens Point ===
	1	2	3	4	Total
No. 12 Falcons	7	14	21	10	52
Pointers	0	7	0	0	7

Statistics	WRF	WSP
First downs	35	11
Total yards	648	262
Rushing yards	307	50
Passing yards	341	212
Turnovers	2	3
Time of possession	34:11	25:49

Team	Category	Player	Statistics
Wisconsin–River Falls	Passing	Kaleb Blaha	31/36, 287 yards, 2 TD
Wisconsin–River Falls	Rushing	Cade Fitzgerald	15 rushes, 117 yards, TD
Wisconsin–River Falls	Receiving	Daniel Stokes	7 receptions, 74 yards, TD
Wisconsin–Stevens Point	Passing	Charlie Smith	13/25, 212 yards, TD, 3 INT
Wisconsin–Stevens Point	Rushing	Brycen Cashin	13 rushes, 29 yards
Wisconsin–Stevens Point	Receiving	Brayden Wiczek	5 receptions, 64 yards, TD

=== At Wisconsin–Eau Claire ===
	1	2	3	4	Total
No. 10 Falcons	28	14	17	14	73
Blugolds	0	21	0	0	21

Statistics	WRF	WEC
First downs	30	15
Total yards	633	286
Rushing yards	341	16
Passing yards	292	270
Turnovers	1	1
Time of possession	32:11	27:49

Team	Category	Player	Statistics
Wisconsin–River Falls	Passing	Kaleb Blaha	17/17, 195 yards, 3 TD
Wisconsin–River Falls	Rushing	Cade Fitzgerald	16 rushes, 136 yards, TD
Wisconsin–River Falls	Receiving	Jake Hilton	3 receptions, 67 yards, TD
Wisconsin–Eau Claire	Passing	Ayden Helder	25/41, 270 yards, 3 TD, INT
Wisconsin–Eau Claire	Rushing	NaKiye Mercado	4 rushes, 16 yards
Wisconsin–Eau Claire	Receiving	Yaach Chuol	3 receptions, 92 yards, 2 TD

=== No. 8 Wisconsin–Whitewater ===
	1	2	3	4	Total
No. 8 Warhawks	0	7	7	0	14
No. 9 Falcons	14	17	7	14	52

Statistics	UWW	WRF
First downs	12	30
Total yards	239	619
Rushing yards	46	115
Passing yards	193	504
Turnovers	2	0
Time of possession	30:30	29:30

Team	Category	Player	Statistics
Wisconsin–Whitewater	Passing	Justin Klinkner	18/35, 193 yards, 2 TD, INT
Wisconsin–Whitewater	Rushing	Darrick Hill	3 rushes, 16 yards
Wisconsin–Whitewater	Receiving	Jacques Brooks	5 receptions, 102 yards
Wisconsin–River Falls	Passing	Kaleb Blaha	30/51, 492 yards, 5 TD
Wisconsin–River Falls	Rushing	Kaleb Blaha	13 rushes, 63 yards, 2 TD
Wisconsin–River Falls	Receiving	Blake Rohrer	5 receptions, 135 yards, TD

=== No. 9 Wisconsin–La Crosse ===
	1	2	3	4	Total
No. 9 Eagles	7	0	0	0	7
No. 8 Falcons	21	3	7	10	41

Statistics	UWL	WRF
First downs	15	31
Total yards	201	534
Rushing yards	42	226
Passing yards	159	308
Turnovers	3	2
Time of possession	24:58	35:02

Team	Category	Player	Statistics
Wisconsin–La Crosse	Passing	Jacob Huber	7/17, 87 yards, INT
Wisconsin–La Crosse	Rushing	Gabe Lynch	12 rushes, 28 yards, TD
Wisconsin–La Crosse	Receiving	Jack Janke	5 receptions, 93
Wisconsin–River Falls	Passing	Kaleb Blaha	35/50, 307 yards, 2 TD, INT
Wisconsin–River Falls	Rushing	Trevor Asher	18 rushes, 128 yards, 2 TD
Wisconsin–River Falls	Receiving	Austin Rush	9 receptions, 67 yards, 2 TD

=== At Wisconsin–Stout ===
	1	2	3	4	Total
No. 4 Falcons	10	3	6	10	29
Blue Devils	0	0	13	6	19

Statistics	WRF	WST
First downs	24	17
Total yards	443	322
Rushing yards	135	52
Passing yards	308	270
Turnovers	5	4
Time of possession	27:30	32:30

Team	Category	Player	Statistics
Wisconsin–River Falls	Passing	Kaleb Blaha	29/49, 308 yards, TD, 3 INT
Wisconsin–River Falls	Rushing	Kaleb Blaha	20 rushes, 97 yards, 2 TD
Wisconsin–River Falls	Receiving	Ben Wesolowski	6 receptions, 119 yards
Wisconsin–Stout	Passing	Adam Moen	19/38, 270 yards, TD, 2 INT
Wisconsin–Stout	Rushing	Adam Moen	25 rushes, 51 yards, 2 TD
Wisconsin–Stout	Receiving	Davonte Evans	6 receptions, 104 yards, TD

=== Chapman (NCAA Division III Second Round) ===
	1	2	3	4	Total
Panthers	0	7	0	0	7
No. 3 Falcons	14	20	10	14	58

Statistics	CHA	WRF
First downs	16	23
Total yards	322	492
Rushing yards	150	190
Passing yards	172	302
Turnovers	6	0
Time of possession	34:33	25:27

Team	Category	Player	Statistics
Chapman	Passing	Tyler Pacheco	15/39, 172 yards, 3 INT
Chapman	Rushing	Fischer Huss	11 rushes, 51 yards
Chapman	Receiving	Kash Henjum	6 receptions, 72 yards
Wisconsin–River Falls	Passing	Kaleb Blaha	17/23, 227 yards, 4 TD
Wisconsin–River Falls	Rushing	Kaleb Blaha	15 rushes, 81 yards, TD
Wisconsin–River Falls	Receiving	Blake Rohrer	3 receptions, 86 yards, TD

=== No. 7 Saint John’s (MN) (NCAA Division III Third Round) ===
	1	2	3	4	Total
No. 7 Johnnies	7	0	7	0	14
No. 3 Falcons	7	7	14	14	42

Statistics	SJU	WRF
First downs	18	29
Total yards	295	433
Rushing yards	22	188
Passing yards	273	245
Turnovers	4	1
Time of possession	25:59	34:01

Team	Category	Player	Statistics
Saint John's	Passing	Trey Feeney	33/59, 274 yards, 2 TD, 2 INT
Saint John's	Rushing	Corey Bohmert; Caden Wheeler	2 rushes, 8 yards 3 rushes, 8 yards
Saint John's	Receiving	Dylan Wheeler	12 receptions, 93 yards, TD
Wisconsin–River Falls	Passing	Kaleb Blaha	22/28, 245 yards, 3 TD, INT
Wisconsin–River Falls	Rushing	Kaleb Blaha	26 rushes, 97 yards, TD
Wisconsin–River Falls	Receiving	Jaylen Reed	4 receptions, 58 yards, TD

=== No. 19 Wheaton (IL) (NCAA Division III Quarterfinal) ===
	1	2	3	4	Total
No. 19 Thunder	0	7	7	7	21
No. 3 Falcons	7	13	13	13	46

Statistics	WHE	WRF
First downs	21	29
Total yards	429	507
Rushing yards	64	100
Passing yards	365	407
Turnovers	2	1
Time of possession	29:53	30:07

Team	Category	Player	Statistics
Wheaton	Passing	Mark Forcucci	27/53, 331 yards, TD, 2 INT
Wheaton	Rushing	Matt Crider	18 rushes, 68 yards, TD
Wheaton	Receiving	Caleb Titherington	9 receptions, 153 yards, TD
Wisconsin–River Falls	Passing	Kaleb Blaha	32/50, 407 yards, 4 TD
Wisconsin–River Falls	Rushing	Trevor Asher	22 rushes, 106 yards, 3 TD
Wisconsin–River Falls	Receiving	Jake Hilton	3 receptions, 126 yards, 2 TD

=== No. 8 Johns Hopkins (NCAA Division III Semifinal) ===
	1	2	3	4	Total
No. 8 Blue Jays	14	13	7	7	41
No. 3 Falcons	14	7	20	7	48

Statistics	JHU	WRF
First downs	25	28
Total yards	461	632
Rushing yards	233	108
Passing yards	228	524
Turnovers	1	1
Time of possession	35:24	24:36

Team	Category	Player	Statistics
Johns Hopkins	Passing	Bay Harvey	14/31, 213 yards, 2 TD, INT
Johns Hopkins	Rushing	Geoff Schroeder	25 rushes, 159 yards, TD
Johns Hopkins	Receiving	Cole Crotty	6 receptions, 99 yards, TD
Wisconsin–River Falls	Passing	Kaleb Blaha	30/48, 520 yards, 5 TD, INT
Wisconsin–River Falls	Rushing	Jaylen Reed	4 rushes, 52 yards, TD
Wisconsin–River Falls	Receiving	Blake Rohrer	9 receptions, 236 yards, 3 TD

=== Vs. No. 1 North Central (IL) (Stagg Bowl) ===
	1	2	3	4	Total
No. 3 Falcons	3	7	7	7	24
No. 1 Cardinals	7	7	0	0	14

Statistics	WRF	NCC
First downs	25	23
Total yards	436	363
Rushing yards	145	169
Passing yards	291	194
Turnovers	0	3
Time of possession	23:45	36:15

Team	Category	Player	Statistics
Wisconsin–River Falls	Passing	Kaleb Blaha	27/41, 291 yards, TD
Wisconsin–River Falls	Rushing	Kaleb Blaha	19 rushes, 128 yards, 2 TD
Wisconsin–River Falls	Receiving	Jake Hilton	4 receptions, 85 yards
North Central	Passing	Garret Wilson	18/28, 194 yards, 2 INT
North Central	Rushing	Donovan McNeal	23 rushes, 133 yards, 2 TD
North Central	Receiving	Thomas Skokna	5 receptions, 77 yards

== Roster ==
2025 Wisconsin–River Falls Falcons football team roster
Players
Coaches
Offense

Pos.	#	Name	Class
WR	1	Joel Humphrey	Jr
WR	2	Ben Wesolowski	Jr
WR	3	Austin Rush	Jr
RB	4	Jaylen Reed	Sr
WR	5	Daniel Stokes	Sr
WR	6	Ethan Chromy	Jr
WR	7	Jeremy Sherlock	Fr
RB	8	Jake Barnard	Jr
QB	9	Frank Daniels	Fr
QB	10	Cade Fitzgerald	Jr
WR	11	Johnny Frank	So
QB	13	Caden Wick	Fr
QB	14	Kaleb Blaha	Sr
WR	15	Jake Hilton	So
QB	16	Max Erb	Fr
WR	17	Jonah Mallberg	So
WR	18	Blake Rohrer	Jr
WR	19	Arthur Russell Jr.	Fr
WR	20	Cody Rezny	Fr
RB	21	Rudy Kletsch	Fr
RB	24	Trevor Asher	So
RB	25	Diego Schmitt	Fr
RB	27	D. J. Stewart II	Fr
RB	34	Ashten Quade	Jr
WR	35	Kaleb Neuenfeldt	Fr
TE	40	Drew Kuempel	So
OL	52	Will Heger	Fr
OL	55	Caleb Campbell	Sr
OL	57	Jack Dietz	Fr
OL	58	Ben Gallus	So
OL	61	Devin Johnson	Fr
OL	62	Kevin Spahn	Sr
OL	63	Tyler Schneidewind	So
OL	64	Blake Ramlet	Fr
OL	65	Alec Pelkey	Fr
OL	66	Hunter McKinney	Sr
OL	67	Landon Weinman	Fr
OL	68	Vincent Peterson	So
OL	69	Payton Kopp	So
OL	70	Owen Hansel	Fr
OL	71	Jai Kalvik	So
OL	72	Kyle Norman	Jr
OL	73	Grayden Thatcher	So
OL	74	Rhowan Smith	So
OL	75	Tenzing Sonam	Fr
OL	76	Levi Oevering	Fr
OL	77	D. J. Fox	Jr
OL	78	Paul Miley	So
OL	79	Jack Boraas	So
TE	80	Reece Brenna	Fr
WR	81	Stephen Reifenberger	Jr
WR	82	Marcus Lomanga	Fr
WR	83	Sam Helgestad	Fr
WR	84	Andrew Karls	Sr
WR	85	Levi Hahn	Fr
WR	86	Evan Olson	Fr
TE	87	Oliver Liffrig	Fr
TE	88	Colin Lifshitz	Fr
TE	89	Adam Johnstone	Jr

Defense

Pos.	#	Name	Class
DB	0	Trent Cherry	Jr
DB	6	Evan Krien	Jr
DB	10	Israel Ogunleye	Fr
DB	11	Andre Hall	Jr
LB	12	Gage Timm	Sr
DB	14	Derek Murphy	Fr
DB	16	Taylor Sussner	Fr
DB	20	Riley Ashburn	Sr
DB	21	Braden Jones	So
DB	22	Conner Preston	Jr
DB	23	Brian Ball	Jr
LB	24	Owen Rose	So
LB	25	Carter Klein	So
LB	26	Alex Carr	So
DB	27	Alex Anderson	Fr
DB	28	Peter Ladu	So
LB	29	Owen Sommmer	Fr
DB	30	Nolan Miller	Jr
DB	31	Jared Schultz	Fr
DB	32	Adam Hamed	Jr
DB	35	Von Trueheart	Sr
LB	36	Nolan Israelson	So
DL	37	Rory Lane	Fr
DB	38	Gage Monpas	So
DB	39	Kellen Quast	So
DB	40	Nick Shade	Fr
DB	41	Bradley Arndorfer	So
DB	42	Nick Wasko	Jr
DB	43	Boyd Hunt	Fr
LB	44	Tanner Kaufman	So
LB	45	Ethan Perkins	So
LB	46	Noah Nusbaum	Fr
DL	47	Levi Bolstad	So
LB	48	Cade Kuempel	Sr
LB	49	Korey Maloney	Jr
DL	50	Brady Block	Jr
DL	51	Mitchell Kallies	Jr
LB	53	Jax Breitenfield	Fr
DL	54	Sebastian Layer	Fr
LB	55	Cooper Cornish	Fr
DL	56	Connor McKenzie	Sr
DL	59	Cayden Kershaw	So
DL	60	Max Dietzman	Fr
DL	66	Carsen Hauser	So
DL	77	Xavier Hankes	Fr
DL	88	Sam Aho	Fr
DL	90	Hunter Pletka	So
DL	91	Beau Schrot	So
DL	92	Jesse Truax	So
DL	93	Carter Quam	Sr
DL	95	Brian Mikel	So
DL	96	Jack Olson	Sr
DL	97	Dominic Miller	Fr
DL	98	Kody Curtis	So
DL	99	John Klefstad	Jr

Special teams

Pos.	#	Name	Class
LS	23	Brandon Bedalov	So
K	28	Justin Scheberll	Sr
K	29	Carter Eklund	Fr
P/K	30	Jeffrey Freund	Fr
LS	44	Logan Zywiec	Fr

Head coach

- Matt Walker (14th season)

Coordinators/assistant coaches

- Joe Matheson (offensive coordinator/wide receivers)
- Jake Wissing (defensive coordinator/linebackers/assistant)
- Parker Kizer (special teams coordinator/tight ends)
- Alex Wood (defensive backs/defensive pass game coordinator)
- Kristian Crabb (offensive line/run game coordinator)
- Scott Imrie (running backs)
- Craig Miles (assistant)
- Pete Range (defensive line)
- Bobby Patterson (kicker/punter)
- Ethan Wegscheider (safeties)
- Michael Noll (assistant defensive line)
- Jake Kreuter (offensive assistant)
- Charlie Korbein (assistant offensive line)
- Aaron Borgerding (free safeties)
- Michael Brown (defensive assistant)
- Alex Klecker (offensive assistant)
- Austin Biwer (student assistant)

Legend

- (C) Team captain
- (S) Suspended
- (I) Ineligible
- Injured
- Redshirt

Roster
Last update: January 6, 2026
