= Hottle =

Hottle is a surname. Notable people with the surname include:

- Ed Hottle (born 1972), American college football coach
- Kaylee Hottle (2008–2026), American actress
