= Steve Azzanesi =

American football coach (born c. 1977–1978)

Biographical details
- Born: c. 1977 or 1978 (age 48–49); Wilmington, Delaware, U.S.
- Education: Wesley College (2000, 2004); Wilmington University (2021)

Playing career

Football
- 1996–1999: Wesley (DE)

Baseball
- 1997–2000: Wesley (DE)
- Position: Quarterback (football)

Coaching career (HC unless noted)

Football
- 2000–2001: Wesley (DE) (GA)
- 2002–2004: Wesley (DE) (WR)
- 2005–2010: Wesley (DE) (PGC)
- 2011–2017: Wesley (DE) (AHC/PGC)
- 2018–2019: Wesley (DE) (AHC/OC/PGC)
- 2020–2021: Delaware State (OC/QB)
- 2022–2025: Alvernia

Administrative career (AD unless noted)
- 2006–2010: Wesley (DE) (assistant AD)
- 2011–2020: Wesley (DE) (assoc. AD)

Head coaching record
- Overall: 5–35

Accomplishments and honors

Awards
- First Team All-ACFC (1998)

Steven M. Azzanesi (born c. 1977 or 1978) is an American college football coach. He most recently served as the head football coach for Alvernia University, a position he held from 2022 to 2025. He also coached for Wesley (DE) and Delaware State. He played college football for Wesley (DE) as a quarterback.

== Playing career and education ==
Azzanesi grew up in Wilmington, Delaware, and attended and played football at St. Elizabeth High School. As a quarterback, he led St. Elizabeth to the state football championship during his junior year in 1994. After his graduation in 1996, Azzanesi attended Wesley College in Dover, Delaware. He played college football as a quarterback and also played baseball. He was a First-team All-ACFC quarterback in 1998 and was a captain for the 1999 baseball team.

Azzanesi earned bachelor's degrees in communications and accounting in 2000 from Wesley. He earned his Master of Business Administration in 2004 while serving as an assistant football coach for Wesley. In May 2021, he earned his doctorate from Wilmington University.

== Coaching career ==
Azzanesi joined his alma mater, Wesley, as a graduate assistant following his graduation. He served in that role for two years before being promoted to wide receivers coach in 2002. In 2005, he was promoted once more to passing game coordinator. In 2011, he added the title of assistant head coach while maintaining his position as passing game coordinator. In his first season as assistant head coach, he helped quarterback Shane McSweeny throw for 3,019 yards and 33 touchdowns. The following year, quarterback Justin Sollilare threw for 3,071 yards and 33 touchdowns. From 2013 to 2015, Azzanesi helped lead quarterback Joe Callahan break every single passing record in Wesley history including his 2015 season, where Callahan threw for 5,068 yards, 55 touchdowns, and was named as the Gagliardi Trophy winner. In 2018, Azzanesi was promoted to offensive coordinator while retaining his two previous titles after nineteen seasons. In his final season with the team in 2019, Wesley finished with a 10–2 record and made an appearance in the NCAA Division III playoffs.

In 2020, Azzanesi was hired as the offensive coordinator and quarterbacks coach for Division I FCS Delaware State under head coach Rod Milstead. In 2021, he helped lead the Hornets to their first five-win season since 2013.

After two seasons with Delaware State, Azzanesi was hired as the second-all-time head coach for Alvernia, replacing Ralph Clark. In Azzanesi's first season, he led the team to its highest season win total with a 3–7 record. In his second season, he led the team to a 1–9 record.

Azzanesi also served as assistant athletic director from 2006 to 2010 before being promoted to associate athletic director for Wesley and maintained the position until he left for Delaware State.

== Head coaching record ==
Year	Team	Overall	Conference	Standing	Bowl/playoffs
Alvernia Golden Wolves (Middle Atlantic Conferences) (2022–2025)
2022	Alvernia	3–7	2–6	T–8th	
2023	Alvernia	1–9	1–8	9th	
2024	Alvernia	1–9	1–8	T–9th	
2025	Alvernia	0–10	0–9	10th	
Alvernia:		5–35	4–31		
Total:		5–35			
