= Jackson Erdmann =

American football player (born 1997)

Carlstad Crusaders
- Position: Quarterback

Personal information
- Born: January 20, 1997 (age 29); Northfield, Minnesota, U.S.
- Listed height: 6 ft 3 in (1.91 m)
- Listed weight: 206 lb (93 kg)

Career information
- High school: Rosemount (MN)
- College: Penn State (2015); Saint John's (MN) (2016–2019)
- NFL draft: 2020: undrafted

Career history
- FCF Wild Aces (2021); Vienna Vikings (2022); Carlstad Crusaders (2026)

Awards and highlights
- ELF champion (2022); FCF champion (2021); Gagliardi Trophy (2018); D3Football.com Offensive Player of the Year (2018)

Jackson Marcus Erdmann (born January 20, 1997) is an American football quarterback for the Carlstad Crusaders in the Superserien. He played college football at Saint John's, a Division III program in Collegeville, Minnesota.

== College career ==
After graduation from Rosemount High School, Erdmann joined the Penn State football team in 2015. One year later, he transferred to Saint John's in Minnesota. Erdmann started all four years that he was at Saint John's, leading the Johnnies to the NCAA tournament quarterfinals in 2018, and to the semifinals in 2019. Based on his performance, Erdmann won the Gagliardi Trophy in 2018 as the most outstanding player in Division III football. He was also a finalist for the award in 2019.

== Professional career ==
Pre-draft measurables
Height	Weight	40-yard dash
6 ft 3 in (1.91 m)	206 lb (93 kg)	5.08 s
All values are from Pro Day

After completing his collegiate career, Erdmann began to prepare for the possibility of playing in the NFL. He began working out and preparing for the draft or to be signed as an undrafted free agent, but the COVID-19 pandemic, which forced NFL teams to stop scouting players, caused Erdmann to receive no offers after going undrafted.

=== FCF Wild Aces ===
In 2021, Erdmann joined the Wild Aces of Fan Controlled Football and went on to win the league's inaugural championship. After impressing in the FCF, Erdmann took part in the University of Minnesota pro day, which was attended by representatives from 31 NFL teams. He received interest from many teams, including having multiple workouts with the Minnesota Vikings, but did not sign an NFL contract.

=== Vienna Vikings ===
He signed with the Vienna Vikings for 2022, in the European League of Football. He helped the Vienna Vikings win the 2022 ELF league championship game 27-15 over the Hamburg Sea Devils. In twelve games, Erdmann threw for 2,849 yards (fifth in the league), 26 touchdowns and 13 interceptions. He had a passer rating of 96.18. Erdmann announced his retirement from football in November 2022.

=== Carlstad Crusaders ===
On October 31st, 2025, Erdmann returned to football and signed with the Carlstad Crusaders of the Superserien.
