= Maurice Banks (American football) =

American football coach (born c. 1983)

Biographical details
- Born: c. 1983 (age 42–43); Brandywine, Maryland, U.S.
- Education: Georgetown University (2006)

Playing career
- 2002–2005: Georgetown
- 2006: Marburg Mercenaries
- 2007: Boise Burn
- 2008: Bergamo Lions
- 2011: Corinthian Black Lions
- Positions: Quarterback, wide receiver, defensive back

Coaching career (HC unless noted)
- ?: Gwynn Park HS (MD) (volunteer)
- 2006: Marburg Mercenaries (DB)
- 2008: Bergamo Lions (DB)
- 2010: Georgetown (DB)
- 2011: Corinthian Black Lions (assistant)
- 2012: Joinville Gladiators (DC)
- 2013–2014: Vasco Da Gama Patriotas (AHC/DC)
- 2013–2014: Rio Atlantico
- 2014–2016: Georgetown (DB)
- 2017–2018: Georgetown (ST/DB)
- 2019: Penn (OLB)
- 2020–2025: Gettysburg

Head coaching record
- Overall: 7–43 (college)

Maurice Banks (born c. 1983) is an American football coach. He most recently served as the head football coach for Gettysburg College, a position he held from 2020 to 2025. He played college football for Georgetown as a defensive back. Banks played professionally in Germany, Austria, and Italy.

== Head coaching record ==
=== College ===
Year	Team	Overall	Conference	Standing	Bowl/playoffs
Gettysburg Bullets (Centennial Conference) (2020–2025)
2020–21	No team—COVID-19				
2021	Gettysburg	1–9	1–8	T–9th	
2022	Gettysburg	1–9	1–8	9th	
2023	Gettysburg	2–8	1–5	6th	
2024	Gettysburg	2–8	1–5	6th	
2025	Gettysburg	1–9	1–6	7th	
Gettysburg:		7–43	5–32		
Total:		7–43			
