= Brandon Robinson (American football) =

American football coach (born c. 1989)

Current position
- Title: Assistant coach
- Team: Wheeling
- Conference: MEC

Biographical details
- Born: c. 1989 (age 36–37); Eaton, Ohio, U.S.

Playing career
- 2008–2011: Ohio Dominican
- Position: Wide receiver

Coaching career (HC unless noted)
- 2012–2014: Eaton HS (OH) (WR)
- 2015: Ohio Dominican (GA)
- 2016: Lindsey Wilson (WR)
- 2017–2019: Wheeling (co-OC/OL)
- 2020–2021: Baldwin Wallace (OC/QB)
- 2022–2025: Bethany (WV)
- 2026–present: Wheeling (assistant)

Head coaching record
- Overall: 3–37

Brandon Robinson (born c. 1989) is an American college football coach. He is an assistant football coach for Wheeling University, a position he has held since 2026. He was previously with Wheeling from 2017 to 2019. He was the head football coach for Bethany College, a position he held from 2022 to 2025. He also coached for Eaton High School, Ohio Dominican, Lindsey Wilson, and Baldwin Wallace. He played college football for Ohio Dominican as a wide receiver.

== Head coaching record ==
Year	Team	Overall	Conference	Standing	Bowl/playoffs
Bethany Bison (Presidents' Athletic Conference) (2022–2025)
2022	Bethany	1–9	0–8	11th	
2023	Bethany	0–10	0–10	11th	
2024	Bethany	1–9	1–9	T–9th	
2025	Bethany	1–9	1–7	T–9th	
Bethany:		3–37	2–34		
Total:		3–37			
