= Tom Kaufman =

American football coach (born c. 1981)

Current position
- Title: Head coach
- Team: Saint Ignatius
- Record: 1-1

Biographical details
- Born: c. 1981 (age 44–45); Cleveland, Ohio, U.S.
- Education: John Carroll University (2003); Heidelberg College (2005)

Playing career
- 1999–2002: John Carroll

Coaching career (HC unless noted)
- 2003–2004: Heidelberg (LB)
- 2005–2007: Case Western Reserve (ST/LB)
- 2008: Chicago (DC/DB)
- 2009: Mississippi State (GA)
- 2010: Kansas (DQC)
- 2011: Texas (DQC)
- 2012: Eastern Illinois (LB)
- 2013: Eastern Illinois (ST/LB)
- 2014: Bowling Green (ST/LB)
- 2015: Bowling Green (ST/DL)
- 2016: Syracuse (ST/LB)
- 2017: Chattanooga (DC/LB)
- 2018–2021: Kent State (assoc. HC/DC/ILB)
- 2023 (spring): John Carroll (DC/LB)
- 2023–2024: Gilmour Academy (OH)
- 2025: Marietta
- 2026–present: Saint Ignatius

Head coaching record
- Overall: 5–5 (college); 21–5 (high school)

Tom Kaufman (born c. 1981) is an American college football coach. He is the head football coach for Saint Ignatius High School, a position he has held since December 2025. He was previously the head football coach for Marietta College for the 2025 season. He also coached for Gilmour Academy, Heidelberg, Case Western Reserve, Chicago, Mississippi State, Kansas, Texas, Eastern Illinois, Bowling Green, Syracuse, Chattanooga, Kent State, and John Carroll. He played college football for John Carroll.

== Head coaching record ==
=== College ===
Year	Team	Overall	Conference	Standing	Bowl/playoffs
Marietta Pioneers (Ohio Athletic Conference) (2025)
2025	Marietta	5–5	3–5	6th	
Marietta:		5–5	3–5		
Total:		5–5			

=== High school ===
Year	Team	Overall	Conference	Standing	Bowl/playoffs
Gilmour Academy Lancers () (2023–2024)
2023	Gilmour Academy	9–3			
2024	Gilmour Academy	12–2			
Gilmour Academy:		21–5			
Total:		21–5			
