= Scott Srnka =

American football player and coach

Current position
- Title: Associate head coach & defensive backs coach
- Team: DePauw
- Conference: NCAC

Biographical details
- Education: Rhodes College (1987); Ohio University (1989)

Playing career
- 1983–1987: Rhodes
- Position: Strong safety

Coaching career (HC unless noted)
- 1988–1989: Ohio (GA)
- 1990: Urbana (DC)
- 1991–1993: Baldwin Wallace (QB/RB/K)
- 1994–2010: Rhodes (DC)
- 2011–2012: DePauw (DC/DB)
- 2012: DePauw (interim HC/DC/DB)
- 2013–present: DePauw (AHC/DB)

Head coaching record
- Overall: 2–6

Accomplishments and honors

Awards
- As player: All-SCAC (1986, 1987)

Scott Srnka is an American football coach. He is currently the associate head coach and defensive backs coach for the DePauw Tigers football team. He previously coached for Ohio, Urbana, Baldwin Wallace, and Rhodes. He played college football as a strong safety at Rhodes.

In 2012, after two weeks Srnka was named interim head coach following the firing of Robby Long. He finished the season with only two wins.

== Head coaching record ==
Year	Team	Overall	Conference	Standing	Bowl/playoffs
DePauw Tigers (North Coast Athletic Conference) (2012)
2012	DePauw	2–6 (Note: Srnka replaced Robby Long after he was fired two weeks into the season.)	1–5	T–8th	
DePauw:		2–6	1–5		
Total:		2–6			
