= Aaron Willits =

American football coach (born c. 1986)

Biographical details
- Born: c. 1986 (age 39–40)
- Education: Knox College (2008)

Playing career
- 2004–2007: Knox (IL)
- Position: Running back

Coaching career (HC unless noted)
- 2008: Knox (IL) (OL/RC)
- 2009: Knox (RB/RC)
- 2010: Township HS District 214 (IL) (assistant) (Note: Mentioned as coach in the school district, but the specific school is not mentioned.)
- 2011–2013: Concordia–Moorhead (FB/RC)
- 2014–2017: Concordia–Moorhead (co-OC/RB)
- 2018–2019: Concordia–Moorhead (OC/OL)
- 2020–2025: Knox (IL)

Head coaching record
- Overall: 16–32

Accomplishments and honors

Awards
- All-MWC (2007)

Aaron Willits (born c. 1986) is an American college football coach. He most recently served as the head football coach for Knox College, a position he held from 2020 to 2025. He also coached for the Township High School District 211 and Concordia–Moorhead. He played college football for Knox as a running back.

== Head coaching record ==
Year	Team	Overall	Conference	Standing	Bowl/playoffs
Knox Prairie Fire (Midwest Conference) (2020–2025)
2020–21	No team—COVID-19				
2021	Knox	3–6	3–6	7th	
2022	Knox	5–5	4–5	6th	
2023	Knox	3–7	3–6	7th	
2024	Knox	3–7	2–7	T–7th	
2025	Knox	2–7	2–6 (Note: While Knox is recognized as 3–6 with their conference record, they were awarded an extra conference victory due to Lawrence forfeiting a game originally scheduled for October 25, 2025 due to an abundance of injuries. However, it is not recognized as a victory on Willits’ record.)	7th	
Knox:		16–32	14–30		
Total:		16–32			
