= Matt Walker (American football) =

American football and baseball coach (born 1977)

Current position
- Title: Head coach
- Team: Drake
- Conference: PFL
- Record: 3–8

Biographical details
- Born: June 15, 1977 (age 49); Crawfordsville, Indiana, U.S.
- Education: DePauw (BA); Indiana State (MA)

Playing career

Football
- 1997–1999: DePauw

Baseball
- 1997–1999: DePauw
- Positions: Quarterback (football); Pitcher (baseball)

Coaching career (HC unless noted)

Football
- 2000–2005: DePauw (RB/WR)
- 2006–2008: DePauw
- 2010: Butler (TE)
- 2011–2025: Wisconsin–River Falls
- 2026–present: Drake

Baseball
- 2000–2009: DePauw

Head coaching record
- Overall: 92–96 (football); 253–166 (baseball)
- Bowls: 2–0
- Tournaments: 5–0 (NCAA D-III playoffs)

Accomplishments and honors

Championships
- 1 WIAC (2025); 1 NCAA Division III (2025)

Awards
- D3football.com National Coach of the Year (2025)

Matt Walker (born June 15, 1977) is an American college football coach and former college baseball coach. He is the head football coach for Drake University, a position he has held since 2026. Walker served as the head football coach at DePauw University from 2006 to 2008 and University of Wisconsin–River Falls from 2011 to 2025. In his final season at Wisconsin–River Falls, he led the 2025 Wisconsin–River Falls Falcons football team to an NCAA Division III football championship title. Walker was also the head baseball coach at DePauw from 2000 to 2009, tallying a mark of 253–166.

Walker played football at DePauw and was the team's starting quarterback. He was an assistant football coach at his alma mater for six seasons, from 2000 to 2005, before Tim Rogers took over as head coach for the DePauw Tigers football program. Walker resigned from his post at DePauw in August 2009. Robby Long was appointed interim head football coach.

== Head coaching record ==
=== Football ===
Year	Team	Overall	Conference	Standing	Bowl/playoffs	AFCA^{#}	D3^{°}
DePauw Tigers (Southern Collegiate Athletic Conference) (2006–2008)
2006	DePauw	6–4	3–3	T–3rd			
2007	DePauw	8–2	5–2	3rd			
2008	DePauw	8–2	5–2	T–2nd			
DePauw:		22–8	13–7				
Wisconsin–River Falls Falcons (Wisconsin Intercollegiate Athletic Conference) (2011–2025)
2011	Wisconsin–River Falls	1–9	1–6	8th			
2012	Wisconsin–River Falls	2–8	2–5	6th			
2013	Wisconsin–River Falls	0–10	0–7	8th			
2014	Wisconsin–River Falls	3–7	2–5	T–5th			
2015	Wisconsin–River Falls	4–6	3–4	5th			
2016	Wisconsin–River Falls	4–6	3–4	T–4th			
2017	Wisconsin–River Falls	4–6	2–5	6th			
2018	Wisconsin–River Falls	3–7	2–5	T–6th			
2019	Wisconsin–River Falls	2–8	1–6	T–7th			
2020–21	No team—COVID-19						
2021	Wisconsin–River Falls	9–2	5–2	3rd	W Isthmus		20
2022	Wisconsin–River Falls	7–4	4–3	T–3rd	W Isthmus		
2023	Wisconsin–River Falls	7–3	4–3	T–3rd			24
2024	Wisconsin–River Falls	7–3	4–3	T–3rd			
2025	Wisconsin–River Falls	14–1	6–1	1st	W NCAA Division III Championship	1	1
Wisconsin–River Falls:		67–80	39–59				
Drake Bulldogs (Pioneer Football League) (2026–present)
2026	Drake	3–8	3–5	T–7th			
Drake:		3–8	3–5				
Total:		92–96					

== See also ==
- List of current NCAA Division I FCS football coaches
