= 2025 Wartburg Knights football team =

American college football season

2025 Wartburg Knights football

A-R-C Champion

NCAA Division III Second Round, L 24–28 vs. Wheaton (IL)
- Conference: American Rivers Conference

Ranking
- AFCA: No. 14
- D3Football.com: No. 12
- Record: 10–1 (8–0 ARC)
- Head coach: Chris Winter (5th season)
- Offensive coordinator: Matt Wheeler (15th season)
- Defensive coordinator: Matt Tschetter (5th season)
- Home stadium: Walston-Hoover Stadium

2025 American Rivers Conference football standings
	Conf.			Overall
Team	W		L	W		L
No. 12 Wartburg $^	8	–	0	10	–	1
No. 25 Coe ^	7	–	1	9	–	3
Central (IA)	6	–	2	8	–	2
Simpson (IA)	5	–	3	6	–	4
Dubuque	4	–	4	4	–	6
Loras	3	–	5	3	–	7
Buena Vista	2	–	6	3	–	7
Nebraska Wesleyan	1	–	7	1	–	9
Luther	0	–	8	0	–	10
$ – Conference champion; ^ – NCAA Division III playoff participant; Rankings from D3football.com

The 2025 Wartburg Knights football team represents Wartburg College as a member of the American Rivers Conference (ARC) during the 2025 NCAA Division III football season. Led by fifth-year head coach Chris Winter, the Knights play home games at Walston-Hoover Stadium in Waverly, Iowa.

The Knights won their 20th conference championship and 3rd straight in 2024. On October 11th in their homecoming game against the University of Dubuque, the Knights won their 30th conference game in a row, which passed the old mark of 29 set by Central College in 1987.

== Schedule ==
Wartburg's 2025 regular season schedule consists of five home, with five on the road.

Date	Time	Opponent	Rank	Site	Result	Attendance
September 6	7:00 p.m.	Monmouth (IL)*	No. 9	Walston-Hoover Stadium; Waverly, IA	W 21–7	3,728
September 13	1:00 p.m.	at Wisconsin–Stout*	No. 10	Williams Stadium; Menomonie, WI	W 16–0	2,252
September 20	1:00 p.m.	at Simpson	No. 10	Buxton Stadium; Indianola, IA	W 27–13	1,689
September 27	1:00 p.m.	Coe	No. 7	Walston-Hoover Stadium; Waverly, IA	W 17–7	3,800
October 4	1:00 p.m.	at Luther	No. 8	Carlson Stadium; Decorah, IA	W 36–3	1,650
October 11	1:30 p.m.	Dubuque^{†}	No. 8	Walston-Hoover Stadium; Waverly, IA	W 33–7	3,400
October 18	1:00 p.m.	at Loras	No. 8	Rock Bowl; Dubuque, IA	W 40–20	1,200
October 25	1:00 p.m.	No. 14 Central (IA)	No. 7	Walston-Hoover Stadium; Waverly, IA	W 28–13	6,100
November 1	1:00 p.m.	at Nebraska Wesleyan	No. 7	Abel Stadium; Lincoln, NE	W 34–10	375
November 15	1:00 p.m.	Buena Vista	No. 6	Walston-Hoover Stadium; Waverly, IA	W 63–20	5,200
November 29	12:00 p.m.	No. 19 Wheaton (IL)*	No. 5	Walston-Hoover Stadium; Waverly, IA (NCAA Division III Second Round)	L 24–28	3,812
*Non-conference game; ^{†}Homecoming; Rankings from D3Football.com Poll released prior to the game; All times are in Central time

== Rankings ==
Ranking movements Legend: ██ Increase in ranking ██ Decrease in ranking
	Week												
Poll	Pre	1	2	3	4	5	6	7	8	9	10	11	Final
D3football.com	9	10	10	7	8	8	8	7	7	6	6	5	12
AFCA	9	10	11	9	9	9	8	7	7	7	6	5	14

== Awards and honors ==
Individual awards
Player	Award
Keenan Tyler	ARC Defensive Player of the Year; AFCA 1st team All-American; AP 1st team All-American; D3football.com 2nd team All-American
Jake Walker	AP 3rd team All-American
Conner McDonald	D3football.com 1st team All-American
Sam Heither	ARC Rookie of the Year
Coach	Award
Chris Winter	ARC Coach of the year

All-Conference
Player	Position	Team	Year
Jake Walker	DL	1	JR
Conner McDonald	DL	1	JR
Keenan Tyler	LB	1	SR
Mac Watts	LB	1	SR
Conner Grover	DB	1	SR
Dawson Rud	RB	1	JR
Sam Heither	TE	1	FR
Cole Hotz	OL	1	SR
Jaxson Hoppes	K	1	SR
Dylan Swanstrom	RS	1	JR
Jack Drahos	DL	2	SR
Jason O'Boye	DB	2	JR
Leo Dodd	QB	2	SR
Cole Mahnke	OL	2	JR
Braden Plotz	OL	2	SO
Dylan Swanstrom	WR	2	JR
Austin Souhrada	LS	HM	FR
Matt Dufoe	TE	HM	SR
Tyler Gayer	LB	HM	JR
Drew Streb	OL	HM	SO
HM = Honorable mention. Reference:
