= Danny Ragsdale =

American football player (born 1977)

No. 11
- Position: Quarterback

Personal information
- Born: February 19, 1977 (age 49)
- Listed height: 6 ft 0 in (1.83 m)
- Listed weight: 180 lb (82 kg)

Career information
- High school: Los Angeles (CA) Daniel Murphy
- College: Redlands
- NFL draft: 2000: undrafted

Career history
- Bismarck Blaze (2000); Iowa Barnstormers (2000)*; New York Dragons (2001–2002); Bismarck Roughriders (2002); Utah Warriors (2003); Billings Outlaws (2004)
- * Offseason or practice squad member only

Awards and highlights
- Gagliardi Trophy (1999); SCIAC Offensive Player of the Year (1999)

Career AFL statistics
- Comp. / Att.: 20 / 37
- Passing yards: 223
- TD–INT: 3–1
- QB rating: 81.25
- Stats at ArenaFan.com

Danny Ragsdale (born February 19, 1977) is an American former professional football quarterback who played two seasons with the New York Dragons of the Arena Football League (AFL). He played college football at the University of Redlands, where he won the Gagliardi Trophy as the best player in Division III. He was also a member of the Bismarck Blaze, Iowa Barnstormers, Bismarck Roughriders, Utah Warriors, and Billings Outlaws. Ragsdale is also an amateur golfer, and has competed in the U.S. Mid-Amateur.

== Early life and college ==
Ragsdale played high school football at Daniel Murphy High School in Los Angeles, California.

Ragsdale played college football and baseball for the Redlands Bulldogs of the University of Redlands. He won the Gagliardi Trophy in 1999 for being Division III's most outstanding football player. He was a three-time All-SCIAC honoree, earned the John Zinda Award in 1998 and was named the SCIAC Offensive Player of the Year in 1999. Ragsdale was inducted into the University of Redlands Athletics Hall of Fame in 2013.

== Professional career ==
Ragsdale played for the Bismarck Blaze of the Indoor Football League in 2000, helping the Blaze earn a playoff berth. He finished with six wins and one loss as the Blaze's starter. He completed 89 of 157 passes for 1,056 yards in nine games with the Blaze. He threw for 21 touchdowns with just six interceptions and finished fourth in the league with a passer rating of 94.9. Ragsdale also ran 25 times for 87 yards and eight touchdowns.

He was a member of the Iowa Barnstormers' practice squad late in the 2000 AFL season.

Ragsdale played for the AFL's New York Dragons from 2001 to 2002. He backed up Aaron Garcia in 2001, throwing two touchdown passes in two games. He started the season opener for the Dragons in 2002, completing 13 of 24 passes for 129 yards, one touchdown and one interception as New York lost to the Los Angeles Avengers by a score of 43–25. Ragsdale was released by the Dragons on April 25, 2002.

He joined the Bismarck Roughriders of the National Indoor Football League (NIFL) in April 2002.

Ragsdale played for the Utah Warriors of the NIFL in 2003. He completed 341 of 505 passes during the regular season for 73 touchdown passes and 17 interceptions as the Warriors advanced to the Indoor Bowl.

Ragsdale played for the NIFL's Billings Outlaws in 2004.

=== AFL statistics ===
Year	Team	Passing							Rushing		
Year	Team	Cmp	Att	Pct	Yds	TD	Int	Rtg	Att	Yds	TD
2001	New York	7	13	53.8	94	2	0	115.54	1	1	0
2002	New York	13	24	54.2	129	1	1	62.67	2	4	0
Career		20	37	54.1	223	3	1	81.25	3	5	0

== Coaching career ==
Ragsdale served as assistant coach with the Stanford Cardinal in 2004, working with the defensive backs, before joining the Minnesota Duluth Bulldogs as offensive coordinator in 2005.

== Personal life ==
Ragsdale is the president and founder of Exclusive Insurance Brokerage, a life insurance general agency located in Westlake Village, California. He is also an amateur golfer, and has competed in the U.S. Mid-Amateur.
