= Gagliardi Trophy =

American college football award

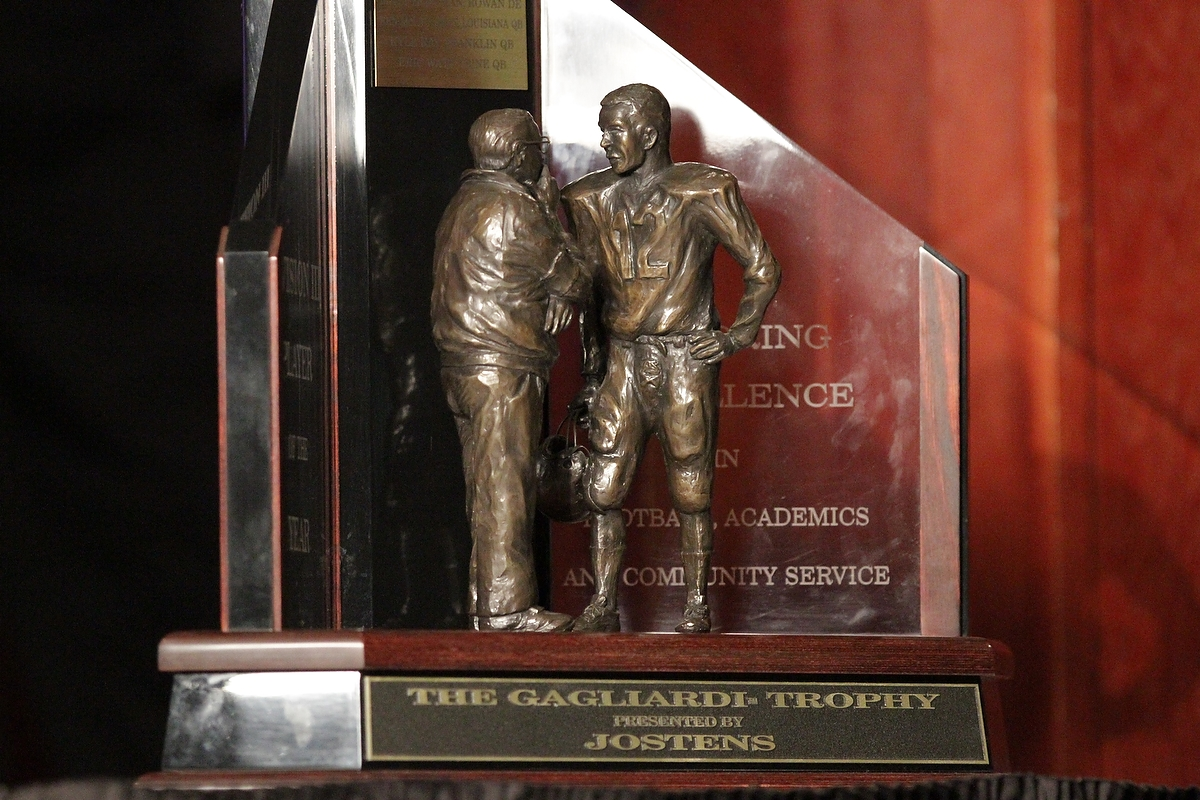
- Image of the Gagliardi Trophy
- Awarded for: Outstanding Division III college football player of the year
- Location: Salem, Virginia
- Country: United States

History
- First award: 1993
- Most recent: UW–River Falls quarterback Kaleb Blaha
- Website: Gagliardi Trophy

The Gagliardi Trophy was first presented in 1993 to the Outstanding Division III college football player of the year by the Jostens Company and the J-Club of Saint John's University in Minnesota. Since that time, the award has become one of the leading collegiate football awards in Division III football, honoring excellence in athletics, academics and community service. The award is named for John Gagliardi, head football coach of Carroll College 1949 to 1952 and Saint John's University in Minnesota from 1953 to 2012. The trophy was presented by the Salem Rotary Club each year in Salem, Virginia until 2018.

== Winners ==
Year	Player	Pos.	School	Ref.
1993	Jim Ballard	QB	Mount Union	
1994	Carey Bender	RB	Coe	
1995	Chris Palmer	WR	Saint John's (MN)	
1996	Lon Erickson	QB	Illinois Wesleyan	
1997	Bill Borchert	QB	Mount Union	
1998	Scott Hvistendahl	WR, P	Augsburg	
1999	Danny Ragsdale	QB	Redlands	
2000	Chad Johnson	QB	Pacific Lutheran	
2001	Chuck Moore	RB	Mount Union	
2002	Dan Pugh	RB	Mount Union	
2003	Blake Elliott	WR, P, KR	Saint John's (MN)	
2004	Rocky Myers	S	Wesley (DE)	
2005	Brett Elliott	QB	Linfield	
2006	Josh Brehm	QB	Alma	
2007	Justin Beaver	RB	UW–Whitewater	
2008	Greg Micheli	QB	Mount Union	
2009	Blaine Westemeyer	OT	Augustana (IL)	
2010	Eric Watt	QB	Trine	
2011	Michael Zweifel	WR	Dubuque	
2012	Scottie Williams	RB	Elmhurst (IL)	
2013	Kevin Burke	QB	Mount Union	
2014	Kevin Burke (2)	QB	Mount Union	
2015	Joe Callahan	QB	Wesley (DE)	
2016	Carter Hanson	LB	Saint John's (MN)	
2017	Brett Kasper	QB	UW–Oshkosh	
2018	Jackson Erdmann	QB	Saint John's (MN)	
2019	Broc Rutter	QB	North Central (IL)	
2020	Not awarded due to COVID-19 pandemic.			
2021	Blaine Hawkins	QB	Central (IA)	
2022	Ethan Greenfield	RB	North Central (IL)	
2023	Luke Lehnen	QB	North Central (IL)	
2024	Luke Lehnen (2)	QB	North Central (IL)	
2025	Kaleb Blaha	QB	UW–River Falls	

=== Winners by school ===
School	Winners
Mount Union	7
North Central (IL)	4
Saint John's (MN)	4
Wesley (DE)	2
Alma	1
Augsburg	1
Augustana (IL)	1
Central (IA)	1
Coe	1
Dubuque	1
Elmhurst	1
Illinois Wesleyan	1
Linfield	1
Pacific Lutheran	1
Redlands	1
Trine	1
UW–Oshkosh	1
UW–River Falls	1
UW–Whitewater	1
