= Robby Long =

American football player and coach (born 1979)

Biographical details
- Born: November 22, 1979 (age 46); Champaign, Illinois, U.S.
- Died: November 6, 2024
- Education: University of Illinois (2002)

Playing career
- 1997–2001: Illinois
- Position: Defensive line

Coaching career (HC unless noted)
- 2002–2003: Illinois (GA)
- 2004–2005: DePauw (assistant)
- 2006 (summer): Chicago Bears (intern)
- 2006–2008: DePauw (AHC/DC)
- 2009–2012: DePauw

Head coaching record
- Overall: 20–12
- Tournaments: 0–2 (NCAA D-III playoffs)

Accomplishments and honors

Championships
- 2 SCAC (2009–2010)

Robert Long (November 22, 1979 – November 6, 2024) was an American college football coach. He was the head football coach for DePauw University from 2009 to 2012. He previously was an assistant coach for DePauw, the Chicago Bears of the National Football League (NFL), and the University of Illinois. He played college football for Illinois.

== Head coaching record ==
Year	Team	Overall	Conference	Standing	Bowl/playoffs
DePauw Tigers (Southern Collegiate Athletic Conference) (2009–2010)
2009	DePauw	7–3	5–1	T–1st	L NCAA Division III First Round
2010	DePauw	9–2	6–0	1st	L NCAA Division III First Round
DePauw Tigers (NCAA Division III independent) (2011)
2011	DePauw	4–5			
DePauw Tigers (North Coast Athletic Conference) (2012)
2012	DePauw	0–2 (Note: Long was fired after two games and was replaced by Scott Srnka for the remainder of the season.)	0–1		
DePauw:		20–12	11–2		
Total:		20–12			
National championship Conference title Conference division title or championship game berth
