= Ed Hottle =

American football coach (born 1972)

Biographical details
- Born: October 25, 1972 (age 54); Alexandria, Virginia, U.S.
- Education: Frostburg State (1999)

Playing career
- 1995–1998: Frostburg State

Coaching career (HC unless noted)
- 1999–2000: Frostburg State (DL)
- 2001: Denison (DC/S&C)
- 2002–2004: Wesley (DE) (LB/DC)
- 2005–2006: Calvert HS (MD)
- 2007–2009: Gallaudet
- 2010–2025: Stevenson

Head coaching record
- Overall: 97–81 (college)
- Bowls: 2–6
- Tournaments: 0–1 (NCAA D–III playoffs)

Accomplishments and honors

Championships
- 1 MAC (2016)

Awards
- ECFC Coach of the Year (2009)

Ed Hottle (born October 25, 1972) is an American college football coach. He was most recently the head football coach for Stevenson University, a position he held from 2010 to 2025. Stevenson began play in 2011. Hottle served as the head football coach at Gallaudet University in Washington, D.C. from 2007 to 2009.

== Head coaching record ==
=== College ===
Year	Team	Overall	Conference	Standing	Bowl/playoffs
Gallaudet Bison (NCAA Division III independent) (2007–2008)
2007	Gallaudet	2–6			
2008	Gallaudet	1–8			
Gallaudet Bison (Eastern Collegiate Football Conference) (2009)
2009	Gallaudet	6–4	4–2	2nd	
Gallaudet:		9–18	4–2		
Stevenson Mustangs (Middle Atlantic Conference) (2011–2025)
2011	Stevenson	2–8	1–7	T–7th	
2012	Stevenson	2–8	2–7	T–7th	
2013	Stevenson	4–6	3–6	T–7th	
2014	Stevenson	8–3	6–3	4th	W Southeast
2015	Stevenson	9–2	7–2	T–2nd	W Centennial-MAC
2016	Stevenson	9–2	8–1	1st	L NCAA Division III First Round
2017	Stevenson	6–5	6–3	4th	L James Lynah
2018	Stevenson	8–3	7–1	T–2nd	L Centennial-MAC
2019	Stevenson	8–3	7–1	2nd	L Centennial-MAC
2020–21	Stevenson	1–0	0–0	N/A	
2021	Stevenson	5–6	5–3	T–3rd	L Centennial-MAC
2022	Stevenson	8–3	6–2	3rd	
2023	Stevenson	7–4	6–3	T–3rd	L Centennial-MAC
2024	Stevenson	5–6	5–4	T–3rd	L Robert M. "Scotty" Whitelaw
2025	Stevenson	6–4	5–4	T–5th	
Stevenson:		88–63	74–47		
Total:		97–81			
National championship Conference title Conference division title or championship game berth
