= Derrin Lamker =

American football coach (born c. 1975)

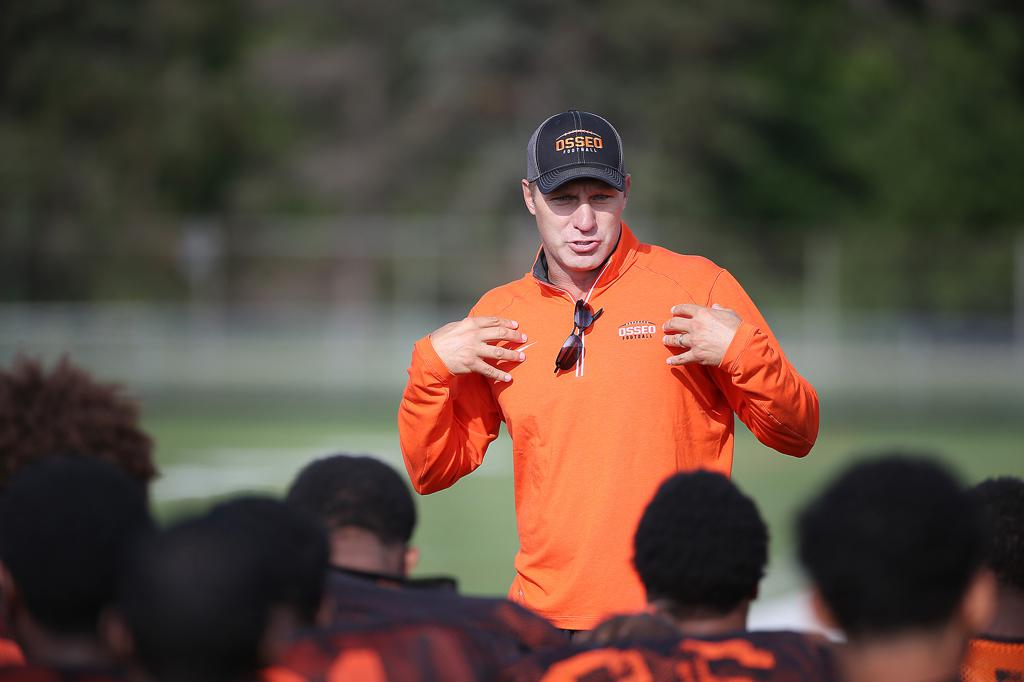
- Lamker in 2015

Current position
- Title: Head coach
- Team: Wayzata HS (MN)
- Record: 76–41

Biographical details
- Born: c. 1975 (age 50–51); Golden Valley, Minnesota, U.S.
- Education: Augsburg University (1998); Saint Mary's College of California (2004)

Playing career
- 1994–1997: Augsburg
- Position: Quarterback

Coaching career (HC unless noted)
- 1998–1999: Augsburg (GA)
- 2000: Augsburg (QB)
- 2001–2002: Augsburg (OC)
- 2003–2004: Robbinsdale Armstrong HS (MN) (OC)
- 2005–2015: Osseo HS (MN)
- 2016: Edina HS (MN) (OC)
- 2017–2019: Edina HS (MN)
- 2020–2024: Augsburg
- 2025: Osseo HS (MN)
- 2025-present: Wazyata HS (MN)

Head coaching record
- Overall: 21–20 (college); 96–52 (high school)

Accomplishments and honors

Awards
- 2× All-MIAC (1996–1997)

Derrin Lamker (born c. 1975) is an American college football coach. He is the head football coach for Wayzata High School, a position he has held since December 2025. He was the head football coach for Osseo High School from 2005-2015, and again in 2025, Edina High School from 2017 to 2019, and Augsburg University from 2020 to 2024. He also was an assistant for Augsburg and Robbinsdale Armstrong High School. He played college football for Augsburg as a quarterback.

== Head coaching record ==
=== College ===
Year	Team	Overall	Conference	Standing	Bowl/playoffs
Augsburg Auggies (Minnesota Intercollegiate Athletic Conference) (2020–2024)
2020–21	Augsburg	1–0	0–0	N/A	
2021	Augsburg	4–6	4–4	3rd (Skyline)	
2022	Augsburg	6–4	4–4	2nd (Skyline)	
2023	Augsburg	6–4	4–4	3rd (Skyline)	
2024	Augsburg	4–6	3–5	3rd (Skyline)	
Augsburg:		21–20	15–17		
Total:		21–20			
