= Steve Vagedes =

American football wide receiver and punter

Profile
- Positions: Wide receiver, Punter

Career information
- High school: Coldwater (Ohio)
- College: Ohio Northern
- NFL draft: 2000: undrafted

Career history
- Atlanta Falcons (2000)*; Green Bay Packers (2001)*; Philadelphia Eagles (2001)*; Barcelona Dragons (2001–2002)*; Detroit Fury (2002); Oakland Raiders (2002)*; Ohio Valley Greyhounds (2003–2004); Port Huron Pirates (2006–2007)
- * Offseason or practice squad member only

Awards and highlights
- OAC Receiver of the Year (1998); 2x Wide Receiver All-American (1998-1999); 2x Punter All-American (1998-1999); 2003 National Indoor Football League champion; 2006 Great Lakes Indoor Football League champion

Career AFL statistics
- Receptions: 2
- Receiving yards: 30
- Tackles: 3.5
- Stats at ArenaFan.com

Steve Vagedes is a retired professional football player that played in the Arena Football League and was a multiple time college football All-American.

== Early life ==
He played for Coldwater High School (Coldwater, Ohio) where he was 2nd-team all-Ohio at offensive end.

== College career ==
Vagedes played for Ohio Northern University where he was a multiple time All-American at both punter and wide receiver. In 1998, he was Ohio Athletic Conference receiver of the year. During the 1999 season he led the nation (Division III) in punting with 46 punts in 13 games for an average of 45.7 yards. He also played in the 1999 Aztec Bowl all-star game.

== National Football League career ==
During the 2000 season he was part of the Atlanta Falcons practice squad. He spent parts of the 2001 season with the Green Bay Packers and Philadelphia Eagles. He spent part of the 2002 season with the Oakland Raiders.

== Arena Football League career ==
Vagedes played for the Detroit Fury of the Arena Football League during the 2002 season.

== Minor league football career ==
Vagedes was twice assigned to the Barcelona Dragons of NFL Europe, but did not play.

He spent the 2003 and 2004 seasons with the Ohio Valley Greyhounds where he won the 2003 National Indoor Football League championship.

He spent the 2006 and 2007 seasons with the Port Huron Pirates where he won the 2006 Great Lakes Indoor Football League championship.
