= Alvernia Golden Wolves football =

College football team

- First season: 2018; 8 years ago
- Athletic director: Bill Stiles
- Head coach: Steve Devlin; 1st season, 0–0 (–)
- Location: Reading, Pennsylvania
- Stadium: Alvernia University Stadium (capacity: 1,000)
- NCAA division: Division III
- Conference: MAC
- Colors: Maroon and gold
- All-time record: 8–63 (.113)
- Mascot: Golden wolves
- Website: auwolves.com

The Alvernia Golden Wolves football team represents Alvernia University in college football at the NCAA Division III level. The Golden Wolves are members of the Middle Atlantic Conferences (MAC), fielding its team in the MAC since 2018. The Golden Wolves play their home games at Alvernia University Stadium in Reading, Pennsylvania.

Their most recent head coach is Steve Devlin, who took over the position for the 2026 season.

== History ==
On October 5, 2016, athletic director Bill Stiles and Alvernia University president Dr. Tom Flynn announced that American football would be added as a varsity sport for the 2018 NCAA Division III season. The team would be a member of the Middle Atlantic Conferences (MAC) alongside the school's other athletic programs.

On July 29, 2018, the school unveiled the team's maroon and gold uniforms.

== Conference affiliations ==
- Middle Atlantic Conferences (2018–present)

== List of head coaches ==
=== Key ===
Key to symbols in coaches list
General		Overall		Conference		Postseason (Note: Although the first Rose Bowl Game was played in 1902, it has been continuously played since the 1916 game, and is recognized as the oldest bowl game by the NCAA. "—" indicates any season prior to 1916 when postseason games were not played.)	
No.	Order of coaches (Note: A running total of the number of head coaches, with coaches who served separate tenures being counted only once. Interim head coaches are represented with "Int" and are not counted in the running total. "—" indicates the team played but either without a coach or no coach is on record. "X" indicates an interim year without play.)	GC	Games coached	CW	Conference wins	PW	Postseason wins
DC	Division championships	OW	Overall wins	CL	Conference losses	PL	Postseason losses
CC	Conference championships	OL	Overall losses	CT	Conference ties	PT	Postseason ties
NC	National championships	OT	Overall ties (Note: Overtime rules in college football were introduced in 1996, making ties impossible in the period since.)	C%	Conference winning percentage		
†	Elected to the College Football Hall of Fame	O%	Overall winning percentage (Note: When computing the win–loss percentage, a tie counts as half a win and half a loss.)				

=== Coaches ===
List of head football coaches showing season(s) coached, overall records, conference records, postseason records, championships and selected awards
No.	Name	Season(s)	GC	OW	OL	O%	CW	CL	C%	PW	PL	PT	DC	CC	NC	Awards
1	Ralph Clark	2018–2021	30	3	27	0.100	1	25	0.038	–	–	–	–	–	–	–
2	Steve Azzanesi	2022–present	20	5	25	0.167	4	22	0.154	–	–	–	–	–	–	–

== Year-by-year results ==
National champions	Conference champions	Bowl game berth	Playoff berth

Season	Year	Head coach	Association	Division	Conference	Record					Postseason	Final ranking
Season	Year	Head coach	Association	Division	Conference	Overall		Conference			Postseason	Final ranking
Season	Year	Head coach	Association	Division	Conference	Win	Loss	Finish	Win	Loss	Postseason	Final ranking
Alvernia Golden Wolves
2018	2018	Ralph Clark	NCAA	Division III	MAC	1	9	T–10th	0	8	—	—
2019	2019	Ralph Clark	NCAA	Division III	MAC	2	8	11th	1	7	—	—
No team due to COVID-19.
2021	2021	Ralph Clark	NCAA	Division III	MAC	0	10	11th	0	8	—	—
2022	2022	Steve Azzanesi	NCAA	Division III	MAC	3	7	T–8th	2	6	—	—
2023	2023	Steve Azzanesi	NCAA	Division III	MAC	1	9	9th	1	8	—	—
2024	2024	Steve Azzanesi	NCAA	Division III	MAC	1	9	T–9th	1	8	—	—
