= Kaleb Blaha =

American football player (born 2001)

Profile
- Position: Quarterback

Personal information
- Born: 2001 (age 24–25); Coon Rapids, Minnesota, U.S.
- Listed height: 6 ft 2 in (1.88 m)
- Listed weight: 201 lb (91 kg)

Career information
- High school: Fridley (Fridley, Minnesota)
- College: Winona State (2020–2021; WR); Wisconsin–River Falls (2022–2025)
- NFL draft: 2026: undrafted

Awards and highlights
- NCAA Division III national champion (2025); Stagg Bowl MVP (2025); Gagliardi Trophy winner (2025); Manning Award finalist (2025); AP NCAA Division III Offensive Player of the Year (2025); D3Football.com Offensive Player of the Year (2025); AFCA First Team All-American (2025); Associated Press First Team All-American (2025); Walter Camp Foundation All-American (2025); D3football.com First Team All-American (2025); WIAC Offensive Player of the Year (2025); NCAA all-divisions single-season total offense leader & record holder (6,189 yards, 2025); NCAA Division III single-season total offense record (prior to all-divisions record)

Kaleb Blaha is an American football quarterback. He previously played college football at Winona State University, where he played as a wide receiver, and Wisconsin–River Falls, where he played as a quarterback.

Blaha led the Falcons to their first NCAA Division III national championship in 2025, earning Amos Alonzo Stagg Bowl MVP honors. He won the 2025 Gagliardi Trophy as the most outstanding player in Division III football and was named a finalist for the Manning Award, becoming the first Division III quarterback ever to receive the honor.

== Early life ==
Blaha attended Fridley High School in Fridley, Minnesota, where he played quarterback. As a senior in 2019, he passed for 1,503 yards and 21 touchdowns while rushing for 821 yards and 21 scores, leading the team to a 10–1 record and a state tournament appearance.

== College career ==
=== Winona State ===
Blaha began his college career at Division II Winona State University where he played as a wide receiver from 2020 to 2021.

=== Wisconsin–River Falls ===
Blaha transferred to the University of Wisconsin–River Falls in 2022 and transitioned back to quarterback. He became the starting quarterback and helped transform the program, which had not had a winning season since 2000.

In 2023, Blaha was a Gagliardi Trophy semifinalist, earned multiple All-American and All-WIAC honors, and set program records with 3,882 yards of total offense and 22 rushing touchdowns.

In 2024, he suffered a season-ending injury after three games and received a medical redshirt.

In 2025, Blaha had a historic senior season:

- Led the Falcons to a WIAC championship (first since 1998) and their first NCAA Division III national title, defeating North Central (IL) 24–14 in the Amos Alonzo Stagg Bowl.
- Named Stagg Bowl MVP.
- Set the NCAA all-divisions single-season total offense record with 6,189 yards (surpassing Joe Burrow's 6,039 in 2019).
- Won the Gagliardi Trophy (Division III's Heisman equivalent).
- Earned Offensive Player of the Year honors from the Associated Press and D3football.com.
- Received first-team All-American recognition from multiple organizations.
- Became a Manning Award finalist (first D-III player ever).
- Broke numerous program and conference records in passing and total offense.

Off the field, Blaha is a health and physical education major with a 3.337 GPA, he earned WIAC Scholastic Honor Roll recognition, and he participated in community service initiatives.

== Professional career ==
After going undrafted in the 2026 NFL draft, Blaha was invited to the New Orleans Saints rookie minicamp. Upon starting camp, Blaha was switched from his quarterback position, to wide receiver.
