= List of college football seasons coached leaders =

This is a list of college football coaches by number of seasons coached. Individuals on the list have served as head coach of a college football program for 30 or more seasons.

"College level" is defined as a four-year college or university program in either the National Association of Intercollegiate Athletics or the National Collegiate Athletic Association. If the team competed at a time before the official organization of either of the two groups but is generally accepted as a "college football program" it would also be included. The list includes coaches with 30 seasons regardless of division.

Coaches expected to be active in the (fall) 2026 season are in bold. Current through the end of the 2025 college football season.

Head coach	First year	Last year	Total years	Games coached	Wins	Losses	Ties	Win %
John Gagliardi	1949	2013	65	638	489	138	11	.775
Eddie Robinson	1941	1997	55	591	408	167	16	.704
Amos Alonzo Stagg	1892	1946	55	555	330	190	35	.626
Joe Paterno	1966	2011	46	659	409 (Note: On July 23, 2012, the NCAA announced that all Penn State victories between the 1998 and 2011 seasons (111 wins) had been vacated due to the loss of institutional control during the Penn State child sex abuse scandal. Paterno was credited with 298 career wins, but on January 16, 2015, the NCAA restored his 111 victories.)	136	3	.749
Kevin Donley	1978	2024	46	514	356	157	1	.694
Bob Ford	1965	2013	45	457	265	191	1	.581
Dennis Douds	1974	2018	45	471	264	204	3	.564
Fred T. Long	1921	1965	45	409	227	151	31	.593
Bobby Bowden	1959	2009	44	510	377 (Note: 12 wins over the 2006 and 2007 seasons were vacated due to use of ineligible player(s).)	129	4	.743
Pop Warner	1895	1938	44	456	318	106	32	.732
Larry Wilcox	1979	2020	42	458	305	153	0	.666
Peter Mazzaferro	1959	2004	41	377	209	157	11	.569
Frosty Westering	1962	2003	40	406	303	96	7	.755
Al Bagnoli	1982	2022	40 (Note: Although Bagnoli has been a head coach throughout the listed period, he has only coached in 40 seasons instead of 41. His employer, Columbia, did not play in the 2020–21 school year due to COVID-19 concerns.)	403	274	129	0	.680
Rick Giancola	1983	2022	40 (Note: Although Giancola has been a head coach throughout the listed period, he has only coached in 40 seasons instead of 41. His employer, Montclair State, did not play in the 2020–21 school year due to COVID-19 concerns.)	405	260	143	2	.644
James S. Malosky	1958	1997	40	393	255	125	13	.665
Roy Kidd	1964	2002	39	446	314	124	8	.713
Jimmye Laycock	1980	2018	39	445	249	194	2	.562
Eddie Anderson	1922	1964	39	344	201	128	15	.606
Barry H. Streeter	1978	2017	39 (Note: Although Streeter held the title of head coach throughout the listed period, he did not coach in the 2004 season. John Campo served as interim head coach in that season.)	391	194	191	5	.504
Bear Bryant	1945	1982	38	425	323	85	17	.780
Hank Biesiot	1976	2013	38	380	258	121	1	.680
Norm Eash	1987	2024	38	367	232	134	1	.634
Ken Sparks	1980	2016	37	412	338	99	2	.772
Monte Cater	1981	2017	37	394	275	117	2	.701
Andy Talley	1979	2016	37	414	257	155	2	.623
Hayden Fry	1962	1998	37	420	232	178	10	.564
Larry Kindbom	1983	2019	37	370	220	149	1	.596
Harold Elliott	1964	2004	37	392	205	179	9	.533
Tubby Raymond	1966	2001	36	422	300	119	3	.714
Brian Kelly	1991	2025	36	409	297	110	2	.729
Mack Brown	1983	2024	36 (Note: Mack Brown has not been a head coach throughout the entire stated period. He was an assistant coach at Oklahoma in 1984 and out of coaching from 2014 to 2018.)	443	288	154	1	.651
Ron Schipper	1961	1996	36	357	287	67	3	.808
Frank Girardi	1972	2007	36	359	257	97	5	.723
Rob Ash	1980	2015	36	389	247	137	5	.641
Rich Lackner	1986	2021	36	361	234	125	2	.651
Ace Mumford	1924	1961	36	341	233	85	23	.717
Ron Randleman	1969	2004	36	391	218	167	6	.565
Eric Hamilton	1977	2012	36	358	212	144	2	.595
Jess Neely	1931	1966	36	363	187	159	17	.539
Frank Beamer	1981	2015	35	427	280	143	4	.660
Fred Martinelli	1959	1993	35	348	217	119	12	.641
**Dave Murray**	1990	2025	35	347	176	170	1	.509
Scrappy Moore	1931	1967	35	332	171	148	13	.535
Tim Murphy	1987	2023	34 (Note: Although Murphy has been a head coach throughout the listed period, he has only coached in 34 seasons instead of 35. His employer, Harvard, did not play in the 2020–21 school year due to COVID-19 concerns.)	367	232	134	1	.634
Willard Bailey	1971	2010	34	387	231	149	7	.606
Walt Hameline	1981	2014	34	365	224	139	2	.616
John Heisman	1893	1927	34	253	171	66	16	.708
Lou Holtz	1969	2004	33	388	249	132	7	.651
**Sherman Wood**	1993	2025	33	345	224	120	1	.650
Mike Ayers	1985	2017	33	380	218	180	2	.576
Bill Manlove	1969	2001	33	327	215	111	1	.659
**Kevin Callahan**	1993	2025	33	348	197	151	0	.566
Craig Rundle	1986	2018	33	326	184	141	1	.566
Gil Dobie	1906	1938	33	242	182	45	15	.783
Geno DeMarco	1993	2025	33	336	173	163	0	.515
Jim Ostendarp	1959	1991	33	264	168	91	5	.646
Lou Little	1924	1956	33	292	151	128	13	.539
John Welty	1990	2023	33	307	130	176	1	.425
**K. C. Keeler**	1993	2025	32	397	276	119	1	.698
Bob Nielson	1989	2024	32	368	239	128	1	.651
Woody Hayes	1946	1978	32	320	238	72	10	.759
John Merritt	1952	1983	32	321	237	72	12	.757
Gene Carpenter	1968	2000	32	314	219	89	6	.707
Ron Harms	1964	1999	32	335	219	112	4	.660
Jim Christopherson	1969	2000	32	326	217	102	7	.676
Cleve Abbott	1923	1954	32	326	202	97	27	.661
Jim Sweeney	1963	1996	32	358	201	153	4	.567
**Todd Knight**	1993	2025	32	338	197	139	2	.586
Carmen Cozza	1965	1996	32	303	179	119	5	.599
Mike Price	1981	2017	32	366	176	190	0	.481
Tim Clifton	1993	2024	32	329	173	156	0	.526
Tony Hinkle	1926	1969	32	277	165	99	13	.619
Dike Beede	1938	1972	32	279	147	118	14	.554
William H. Spaulding	1907	1938	32	242	144	83	15	.626
Harry W. Hughes	1911	1946	32	240	126	96	18	.563
Chris Smith	1984	2015	32	309	122	185	2	.398
Jason M. Saunderson	1909	1941	32	237	121	103	13	.538
Lew Elverson	1938	1974	32	235	97	130	8	.430
Roger Harring	1969	1999	31	343	261	75	7	.771
Jerry Moore	1979	2012	31	379	243	135	2	.642
Billy Joe	1972	2004	31	349	237	108	4	.685
Warren B. Woodson	1935	1973	31	312	203	95	14	.673
Jim Dennison	1973	2012	31	340	199	139	2	.588
Art Keller	1952	1982	31	271	177	87	7	.667
Eddie Hurt	1929	1959	31	243	173	52	18	.7498
Buddy Benson	1965	1995	31	310	162	140	8	.535
Dennis Miller	1986	2019	31	321	148	173	0	.461
Watson Brown	1979	2015	31 (Note: Watson Brown was not a head coach throughout the stated period. He served as an assistant in six seasons, first at Vanderbilt, later at Mississippi State, and finally at Oklahoma.)	348	136	211	1	.392
Tuss McLaughry	1922	1954	31	276	135	131	10	.507
Joe Taylor	1983	2012	30	333	233	96	4	.706
**Kirk Ferentz**	1990	2025	30	370	221	149	0	.597
Dennis Franchione	1981	2015	30	350	213	135	2	.611
Don Nehlen	1968	2000	30	338	202	128	8	.609
Dan McGugin	1904	1934	30	271	197	55	19	.762
Dana X. Bible	1916	1946	30	272	186	65	21	.722
Bob Blackman	1953	1982	30	287	168	112	7	.598
Howdy Myers	1946	1979	30	284	167	112	5	.597
Frank Howard	1940	1969	30	295	165	118	12	.580
**Jack Cosgrove**	1993	2025	30	326	154	172	0	.472
Robert Kolf	1929	1962	30	198	59	123	16	.338

== See also ==
- List of college football career coaching winning percentage leaders
- List of college football career coaching wins leaders
- List of college football career coaching losses leaders
