= List of College Football Hall of Fame inductees (coaches) =

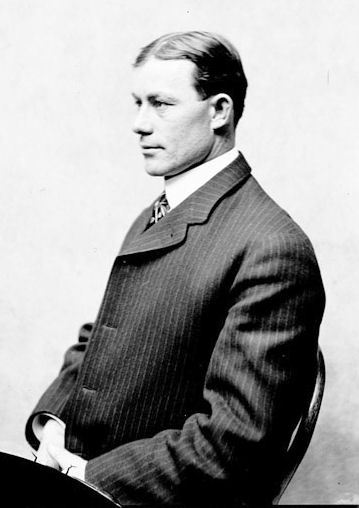
Fielding H. Yost, one of the first coaches inducted into the Hall of Fame in 1951

This is a list of College Football Hall of Fame members who have been inducted as coaches. As of the 2026 inductions, 241 individuals have been inducted as coaches since the College Football Hall of Fame was established in 1951.

== Details ==
=== Active coaches ===
Seven individuals have coached as College Football Hall of Fame inductees:

- John Ralston was inducted in 1992 following his tenures with Utah State (1959–1962) and Stanford (1963–1971). He came out of retirement in 1993 to coach San Jose State and remained active through the 1996 season.
- Chris Ault was inducted in 2002 following two stints with Nevada (1976–1992 and 1994–1995). He returned as head coach at Nevada from 2004 to 2012.
- Bobby Bowden was inducted in 2006 and remained active as a head coach with Florida State until his retirement in 2009.
- John Gagliardi was also inducted in 2006 and remained active with Saint John's in Minnesota until he retired in 2012.
- Joe Paterno was inducted in 2007 and remained as a head coach at Penn State until he was fired during the 2011 season as a result of the Penn State child sex abuse scandal.
- Bill Snyder was inducted in 2015 as an active head coach for the Kansas State Wildcats. He remained Kansas State's head coach though the 2018 season.
- Mack Brown was inducted in 2018 while working as a college football analyst for ESPN, having last coached at Texas in 2013. Brown returned to coaching the next year, returning to his previous position as head coach of the North Carolina Tar Heels, where he remained until 2024.

=== Time frame ===
Walter Camp first became a head coach in 1888 and is the earliest on the list to be named a head coach. Lloyd Carr first became a head coach in 1995 and is the most recent head coach appointee on the list. Edward K. Hall was a head coach for only two years, in 1892 and 1893, while John Gagliardi was head coach for 64 years before retiring at the end of the 2012 season.

=== Win–loss records ===
Edward K. Hall and John Gagliardi have, respectively, the fewest wins (10) and most wins (489) on the list. Walter Camp has the fewest losses at five while Amos Alonzo Stagg has the most losses at 199. Stagg also has the most games resulting in a tie at 35. Multiple coaches have finished their career with zero ties, and overtime rules in college football were introduced in 1996 which make ties impossible in the period since. Larry Kehres has the highest win percentage at .929; Walter Camp is second at .925. Tuss McLaughry has the lowest win percentage at .490. He is only coach on the list under the .500 mark.

== List of College Football Hall of Fame coaches ==
Name	Teams	First year	Last year	Years	Games	Wins	Losses	Ties	Pct.	Year inducted
Joe Aillet	Louisiana Tech	1940	1966	26	245	151	86	8	.633	1989
Bill Alexander	Georgia Tech	1920	1944	25	244	134	95	15	.580	1951
Barry Alvarez	Wisconsin	1990	2005	16	195	118	77	4	.603	2010
Eddie Anderson	Columbia (IA), DePaul, Holy Cross, Iowa	1922	1964	39	344	201	128	15	.606	1971
Ike Armstrong	Utah	1925	1949	25	211	141	55	15	.704	1957
Volney Ashford	Missouri Valley	1937	1967	31	264	197	55	12	.769	2009
Chris Ault	Nevada	1976	2012	28	343	233	109	1	.681	2002
Charlie Bachman	Northwestern, Kansas State, Florida, Michigan State, Hillsdale	1919	1953	28	232	137	82	24	.613	1978
Earl Banks	Morgan State	1960	1973	14	129	96	31	2	.752	1992
Harry Baujan	Dayton	1923	1946	21	196	124	64	8	.653	1990
Frank Beamer	Murray State, Virginia Tech	1981	2015	34	427	280	143	4	.660	2018
Tom Beck	St. Procopius / Illinois Benedictine, Elmhurst, Grand Valley State	1970	1990	19	190	153	52	1	.745	2004
Matty Bell	Haskell, Carroll (WI), TCU, Texas A&M, SMU	1920	1949	26	258	153	88	17	.626	1955
Mike Bellotti	Chico State, Oregon	1995	2008	19	219	137	80	2	.630	2014
Hugo Bezdek	Oregon, Arkansas, Penn State, Delaware Valley	1906	1949	24	201	127	58	16	.672	1954
Dana X. Bible	Mississippi College, LSU, Texas A&M, Nebraska, Texas	1913	1946	33	293	198	72	23	.715	1951
Bernie Bierman	Montana, Mississippi State, Tulane, Iowa Pre-Flight, Minnesota	1919	1950	27	230	153	65	12	.691	1955
Bob Blackman	Denver, Dartmouth, Illinois, Cornell	1953	1982	30	287	168	112	7	.598	1987
Earl Blaik	Dartmouth, Army	1934	1958	25	228	166	48	14	.759	1964
Larry Blakeney	Troy	1991	2014	24	292	178	131	1	.611	2025
Bobby Bowden	Samford, West Virginia, Florida State	1959	2009	44	510	377	129	4	.743	2006
Bill Bowes	New Hampshire	1972	1998	27	286	175	106	5	.621	2016
Mack Brown	Appalachian State, Tulane, North Carolina, Texas	1983	2024	35	432	282	149	1	.654	2018
Frank Broyles	Missouri, Arkansas	1957	1976	20	217	149	62	6	.700	1983
Earle Bruce	Tampa, Iowa State, Ohio State, Northern Iowa, Colorado State	1972	1992	21	246	154	90	2	.630	2002
Bear Bryant	Maryland, Kentucky, Texas A&M, Alabama	1945	1982	38	425	323	85	17	.780	1986
Harold Burry	Westminster (PA)	1952	1971	20	163	127	31	5	.794	1996
Jim Butterfield	Ithaca	1967	1993	27	278	206	71	1	.743	1997
Wally Butts	Georgia	1939	1960	22	235	140	86	9	.615	1997
Charlie Caldwell	Williams, Princeton	1928	1956	27	222	146	67	9	.678	1961
Walter Camp	Yale, Stanford	1888	1895	8	87	79	5	3	.925	1951
Gene Carpenter	Adams State, Millersville	1968	2000	32	316	220	96	6	.693	2012
Lloyd Carr	Michigan	1995	2007	13	162	122	40	0	.753	2011
Len Casanova	Santa Clara, Pittsburgh, Oregon	1946	1966	21	209	104	94	11	.524	1977
Marino Casem	Alabama State, Alcorn State, Southern	1963	1992	26	260	159	93	8	.627	2003
Monte Cater	Lakeland, Shepherd	1981	2017	37	394	275	117	2	.701	2023
Frank Cavanaugh	Cincinnati, Holy Cross, Dartmouth, Boston College, Fordham	1898	1932	24	210	146	47	17	.736	1954
Jim Christopherson	Concordia (MN)	1969	2000	32	326	218	101	7	.677	2007
Frank Cignetti Sr.	West Virginia, IUP	1976	2005	24	277	199	77	1	.720	2013
Jerry Claiborne	Virginia Tech, Maryland, Kentucky	1961	1989	28	309	178	122	8	.591	1999
Dick Colman	Princeton	1957	1968	12	108	75	33	0	.694	1990
John Cooper	Tulsa, Arizona State, Ohio State	1977	2000	24	282	192	84	6	.691	2008
Don Coryell	Whittier, San Diego State	1957	1972	15	154	127	24	3	.834	1999
Carmen Cozza	Yale	1965	1996	32	303	179	119	5	.599	2002
Fritz Crisler	Minnesota, Princeton, Michigan	1930	1947	18	157	116	32	9	.768	1954
Mark Dantonio	Cincinnati, Michigan State	2004	2019	16	206	132	74	0	.641	2024
Duffy Daugherty	Michigan State	1954	1972	19	183	109	69	5	.623	1984
Fisher DeBerry	Air Force	1984	2006	23	279	169	109	1	.608	2011
Herb Deromedi	Central Michigan	1978	1993	16	175	110	55	10	.657	2007
Bob Devaney	Wyoming, Nebraska	1957	1972	16	173	136	30	7	.806	1981
Dan Devine	Arizona State, Missouri, Notre Dame	1955	1980	22	239	173	57	9	.743	1985
Doug Dickey	Tennessee, Florida	1964	1978	15	168	104	58	6	.639	2003
William Henry Dietz	Washington State, Purdue, Louisiana Tech, Wyoming, Haskell, Albright	1915	1942	19	166	96	62	8	.752	2012
Gil Dobie	North Dakota State, Washington, Navy, Cornell, Boston College	1906	1938	33	242	182	45	15	.783	1951
Bobby Dodd	Georgia Tech	1945	1966	22	237	165	64	8	.713	1993
Mike Donahue	Auburn, LSU	1904	1927	23	191	129	54	8	.696	1951
Terry Donahue	UCLA	1976	1995	20	233	151	74	8	.665	2000
Jim Donnan	Marshall, Georgia	1990	2000	11	145	104	40	1	.721	2009
Boots Donnelly	Austin Peay, Middle Tennessee	1977	1998	22	249	154	94	1	.620	2013
Vince Dooley	Georgia	1964	1988	25	288	201	77	10	.715	1994
Gus Dorais	Loras, Gonzaga, Detroit	1914	1942	27	232	151	70	12	.674	1954
Jess Dow	Southern Connecticut State	1948	1965	18	154	107	41	6	.714	2013
Pat Dye	East Carolina, Wyoming, Auburn	1974	1992	19	220	153	62	5	.707	2006
Bill Edwards	Western Reserve, Vanderbilt, Wittenberg	1936	1968	23	221	168	45	8	.777	1986
LaVell Edwards	BYU	1972	2000	29	361	257	101	3	.716	2004
Rip Engle	Brown, Penn State	1944	1965	22	208	132	68	8	.654	1973
Dennis Erickson	Idaho, Wyoming, Washington State, Miami (FL), Oregon State, Arizona State	1982	2011	23	276	179	96	1	.650	2019
Forest Evashevski	Hamilton, Washington State, Iowa	1941	1960	12	109	68	35	6	.651	2000
Dick Farley	Williams	1987	2003	17	136	114	19	3	.849	2006
Don Faurot	Kirksville State, Iowa Pre-Flight, NAS Jacksonville, Missouri	1926	1956	30	286	177	96	13	.639	1961
Danny Ford	Clemson, Arkansas	1978	1997	17	186	122	59	5	.669	2017
Hayden Fry	SMU, North Texas State, Iowa	1962	1998	37	420	232	178	10	.564	2003
Phillip Fulmer	Tennessee	1992	2008	17	204	152	42	0	.745	2012
Joe Fusco	Westminster (PA)	1972	1990	19	191	154	34	3	.814	2001
John Gagliardi	Carroll (MT), Saint John's (MN)	1949	2012	64	638	489	138	11	.775	2006
Jake Gaither	Saint Paul's (VA), Florida A&M	1936	1969	26	251	205	41	5	.827	1975
Sid Gillman	Miami (OH), Cincinnati	1944	1954	10	102	81	19	2	.804	1989
Frank Girardi	Lycoming	1972	2007	36	358	257	97	4	.723	2016
Ernie Godfrey	Wittenberg	1916	1928	11	93	63	24	8	.705	1972
W. C. Gorden	Jackson State	1977	1991	15	170	118	47	5	.709	2008
Ray Graves	Florida	1960	1969	10	105	70	31	4	.686	1990
Andy Gustafson	Virginia Tech, Miami (FL)	1926	1963	20	197	115	78	4	.594	1985
Danny Hale	West Chester, Bloomsburg	1984	2012	25	283	213	69	1	.754	2024
Edward K. Hall	Illinois	1892	1893	2	20	10	6	4	.600	1951
Wayne Hardin	Navy, Temple	1959	1982	19	197	118	74	5	.612	2013
Jack Harding	Scranton, Miami (FL)	1926	1947	20	184	103	69	12	.592	1980
Dick Harlow	Penn State, Colgate, Western Maryland, Harvard	1915	1947	27	235	149	69	17	.670	1954
Harvey Harman	Haverford, Sewanee, Penn, Rutgers	1922	1955	30	254	140	107	7	.565	1981
Ron Harms	Concordia (NE), Adams State, Texas A&M–Kingsville	1964	1999	31	184	218	112	5	.658	2012
Jesse Harper	Notre Dame	1906	1917	11	81	57	17	7	.747	1971
Roger Harring	Wisconsin–La Crosse	1969	1999	31	343	261	75	7	.771	2005
Percy Haughton	Cornell, Harvard, Columbia	1899	1924	13	120	97	17	6	.833	1951
Woody Hayes	Denison, Miami (OH), Ohio State	1946	1978	33	320	238	72	10	.759	1983
John Heisman	Oberlin, Akron, Auburn, Clemson, Georgia Tech, Penn, Washington & Jefferson, Rice	1892	1927	36	272	186	70	18	.712	1954
Bob Higgins	West Virginia Wesleyan, Washington University, Penn State	1920	1948	26	222	123	86	16	.582	1954
Paul Hoernemann	Heidelberg	1946	1959	14	124	102	18	4	.839	1997
Babe Hollingbery	Washington State	1926	1942	17	160	93	53	14	.625	1979
Lou Holtz	William & Mary, NC State, Arkansas, Minnesota, Notre Dame, South Carolina	1969	2004	33	388	239	132	7	.642	2008
Frank Howard	Clemson	1940	1969	30	295	165	118	12	.580	1989
Rudy Hubbard	Florida A&M	1974	1985	12	134	83	48	3	.631	2021
Marcelino Huerta	Tampa, Wichita State	1952	1967	16	159	98	58	3	.589	2002
Bill Ingram	William & Mary, Indiana, Navy, California	1922	1934	13	126	75	42	9	.585	1973
Don James	Kent State, Washington	1971	1992	22	257	178	76	3	.698	1998
Willie Jeffries	South Carolina State, Howard, Wichita State	1973	2001	29	318	180	132	6	.587	2010
Morley Jennings	Ouachita, Baylor	1912	1940	29	248	153	77	18	.653	1973
Billy Joe	Cheyney State, Central State (OH), Florida A&M	1972	2004	31	349	237	108	4	.685	2007
Jimmy Johnson	Oklahoma State, Miami (FL)	1979	1988	10	118	81	34	3	.699	2012
Paul Johnson	Georgia Southern, Navy, Georgia Tech	1997	2018	22	288	189	99	0	.656	2023
Biff Jones	Army, LSU, Oklahoma, Nebraska	1926	1941	14	135	87	33	15	.700	1954
Howard Jones	Syracuse, Yale, Ohio State, Iowa, Duke, USC	1908	1940	29	279	194	64	21	.733	1951
Tad Jones	Syracuse, Yale	1909	1927	12	99	69	24	6	.727	1958
Lloyd Jordan	Amherst, Harvard	1932	1956	23	181	101	72	8	.580	1978
Ralph Jordan	Auburn	1951	1975	25	266	176	83	7	.675	1982
Larry Kehres	Mount Union	1986	2012	27	359	332	24	3	.929	2017
Mike Kelly	Dayton	1981	2007	27	301	246	54	1	.819	2011
Andrew Kerr	Stanford, Washington & Jefferson, Colgate, Lebanon Valley	1922	1949	26	222	137	71	14	.649	1951
Ted Kessinger	Bethany (KS)	1976	2003	28	277	219	57	1	.792	2010
Roy Kidd	Eastern Kentucky	1964	2002	39	446	314	124	8	.713	2003
Chuck Klausing	Indiana (PA), Carnegie Mellon	1964	1985	16	151	123	26	2	.821	1998
Frank Kush	Arizona State	1958	1979	22	231	176	54	1	.764	1995
Larry Korver	Northwestern (IA)	1967	1994	28	295	212	77	6	.729	2025
Roy Kramer	Central Michigan	1967	1977	11	117	83	32	2	.718	2023
Frank Leahy	Boston College, Notre Dame	1939	1953	13	129	107	13	9	.864	1970
George Little	Cincinnati, Miami (OH), Michigan, Wisconsin	1914	1926	9	74	54	16	4	.757	1955
Lou Little	Georgetown, Columbia	1924	1956	33	292	151	128	13	.539	1960
John Luckhardt	Washington & Jefferson, California (PA)	1982	2011	27	297	225	70	2	.761	2022
Dick MacPherson	Massachusetts, Syracuse	1971	1990	17	189	111	73	5	.601	2009
Slip Madigan	Saint Mary's, Iowa	1921	1944	21	190	119	58	13	.661	1974
Bill Manlove	Widener, Delaware Valley, La Salle	1969	2001	32	324	212	111	1	.656	2011
Jim Margraff	Johns Hopkins	1990	2018	29	313	221	89	3	.711	2026
Fred Martinelli	Ashland	1959	1993	35	348	217	119	12	.641	2002
Dave Maurer	Wittenberg	1969	1983	15	155	129	23	3	.842	1991
Vernon McCain	Maryland State	1948	1963	16	128	101	21	6	.813	2006
Bill McCartney	Colorado	1982	1994	13	153	93	55	5	.624	2013
Charles McClendon	LSU	1962	1979	18	203	137	59	7	.692	1986
Herb McCracken	Allegheny, Lafayette	1921	1935	15	130	75	48	7	.604	1973
Dan McGugin	Vanderbilt	1904	1934	30	271	197	55	19	.762	1951
John McKay	USC	1960	1975	16	175	127	40	8	.749	1988
Allyn McKeen	Memphis State, Mississippi State	1937	1948	11	106	78	25	3	.750	1991
Tuss McLaughry	Westminster (PA), Amherst, Brown, Dartmouth	1915	1954	35	305	143	149	13	.490	1962
John Merritt	Jackson State, Tennessee State	1952	1983	32	321	237	72	12	.757	1994
Dutch Meyer	TCU	1934	1952	19	201	109	79	13	.575	1956
Urban Meyer	Bowling Green, Utah, Florida, Ohio State	2001	2018	18	219	187	32	0	.854	2025
Jack Mollenkopf	Purdue	1956	1969	14	132	84	39	9	.697	1988
Scrappy Moore	Chattanooga	1931	1967	35	302	171	148	13	.535	1980
Bernie Moore	Mercer, LSU	1926	1947	16	155	95	51	9	.642	1954
Jerry Moore	North Texas, Texas Tech, Appalachian State	1979	2012	31	379	242	135	2	.641	2014
Ray Morrison	SMU, Vanderbilt, Temple, Austin	1915	1952	34	319	155	130	34	.537	1954
Darrell Mudra	Adams State, North Dakota State, Arizona, Florida State, Eastern Illinois, Northern Iowa	1959	1987	26	285	200	81	4	.709	2000
Ace Mumford	Jarvis Christian, Bishop, Texas College, Southern	1924	1961	36	341	233	85	23	.717	2001
George Munger	Penn	1938	1953	16	134	82	42	10	.649	1976
Biggie Munn	Albright, Syracuse, Michigan State	1935	1953	10	90	71	16	3	.806	1959
Billy J. Murphy	Memphis State	1958	1971	14	136	91	44	1	.673	2022
William D. Murray	Delaware, Duke	1940	1965	23	220	142	67	11	.670	1974
Frank Murray	Marquette, Virginia	1923	1949	28	245	145	89	11	.614	1983
Edward Mylin	Lebanon Valley, Bucknell, Lafayette, NYU	1923	1949	24	211	99	95	17	.509	1974
Greasy Neale	Muskingum, West Virginia Wesleyan, Marietta, Washington & Jefferson, Virginia, West Virginia	1915	1933	16	147	82	54	11	.595	1967
Jess Neely	Southwestern (TN), Clemson, Rice	1924	1966	40	402	207	176	19	.539	1971
Don Nehlen	Bowling Green, West Virginia	1968	2000	30	338	202	128	8	.609	2006
David M. Nelson	Hillsdale, Maine, Delaware	1946	1965	19	159	105	48	6	.679	1987
Robert Neyland	Tennessee	1926	1952	21	216	173	31	12	.829	1956
Billy Nicks	Morris Brown, Prairie View A&M	1930	1965	28	277	195	61	21	.745	1999
Homer H. Norton	Centenary, Texas A&M	1919	1947	25	236	143	75	18	.644	1971
Frank "Buck" O'Neill	Colgate, Williams, Syracuse, Columbia	1902	1922	15	141	87	45	9	.649	1951
Tom Osborne	Nebraska	1973	1997	25	307	255	49	3	.836	1998
Bennie Owen	Washburn, Bethany (KS), Oklahoma	1900	1926	26	226	150	58	18	.704	1951
Ara Parseghian	Miami (OH), Northwestern, Notre Dame	1951	1974	24	234	170	58	6	.739	1980
Joe Paterno	Penn State	1966	2011	46	548	409	136	3	.749	2007
Gary Patterson	TCU	2000	2021	22	260	181	79	0	.696	2026
Doyt Perry	Bowling Green	1955	1964	10	93	77	11	5	.855	1988
Chris Petersen	Boise State, Washington	2006	2019	14	185	147	38	0	.795	2026
James Phelan	Missouri, Purdue, Washington, Saint Mary's	1920	1947	28	238	137	87	14	.605	1973
Gary Pinkel	Toledo, Missouri	1991	2015	25	304	191	110	3	.633	2022
Doug Porter	Mississippi Valley State, Howard, Fort Valley State	1961	1996	28	230	155	110	5	.583	2008
Tommy Prothro	Oregon State, UCLA	1955	1970	16	164	104	55	5	.649	1991
John Ralston	Utah State, Stanford, San Jose State	1959	1996	17	182	97	81	4	.544	1992
Tubby Raymond	Delaware	1966	2001	36	423	300	119	4	.714	2003
Bob Reade	Augustana (IL)	1979	1994	16	170	146	23	1	.862	1998
Charlie Richard	Baker	1980	1994	14	152	123	28	1	.813	2004
Mark Richt	Georgia, Miami (FL)	2001	2018	18	235	171	64	0	.728	2023
Eddie Robinson	Grambling	1941	1997	55	588	408	165	15	.707	1997
Edward N. Robinson	Nebraska, Brown, Maine, Tufts	1898	1925	28	266	159	94	13	.622	1955
John Robinson	USC, UNLV	1976	2004	18	213	132	77	4	.629	2009
Knute Rockne	Notre Dame	1918	1930	13	122	105	12	5	.881	1951
Dick Romney	Utah State	1919	1948	29	235	128	91	16	.579	1951
William Roper	VMI, Princeton, Missouri, Swarthmore	1903	1930	22	168	112	38	18	.720	1954
Darrell Royal	Mississippi State, Washington, Texas	1954	1976	23	249	184	60	5	.749	1983
Ad Rutschman	Linfield	1968	1991	24	234	183	48	3	.788	1998
Nick Saban	Toledo, Michigan State, Louisiana State, Alabama	1990	2023	28	364	292	71	1	.804	2025
Red Sanders	Vanderbilt, UCLA	1940	1957	15	146	102	41	3	.709	1996
George Sanford	Columbia, Virginia, Rutgers	1899	1923	15	136	84	46	6	.640	1971
Bo Schembechler	Miami (OH), Michigan	1963	1989	27	307	234	65	8	.775	1993
Ron Schipper	Central (IA)	1961	1996	36	357	287	67	3	.808	2000
Francis Schmidt	Tulsa, Arkansas, TCU, Ohio State, Idaho	1919	1942	24	225	157	58	11	.719	1971
Ben Schwartzwalder	Muhlenberg, Syracuse	1946	1973	28	277	178	96	3	.672	1982
Clark Shaughnessy	Tulane, Loyola (LA), Chicago, Stanford, Maryland, Pittsburgh, Hawaii	1915	1965	32	284	151	116	17	.562	1968
Buck Shaw	NC State, Nevada, Santa Clara, California, Air Force	1924	1957	15	133	72	49	12	.586	1972
Dick Sheridan	Furman, NC State	1978	1992	15	178	121	52	5	.694	2020
Ed Sherman	Muskingum	1945	1966	22	191	141	43	7	.757	1996
R. C. Slocum	Texas A&M Aggies	1989	2002	14	173	123	47	2	.721	2012
Andy Smith	Penn, Purdue, California	1909	1925	17	161	116	32	13	.761	1951
Carl Snavely	Bucknell, North Carolina, Cornell, Washington University	1927	1958	32	292	180	96	16	.644	1965
Bill Snyder	Kansas State	1989	2018	27	333	215	117	1	.647	2015
Jim Sochor	UC Davis	1970	1988	19	202	155	42	5	.780	1999
Ken Sparks	Carson–Newman	1980	2016	37	439	338	99	2	.772	2026
Frank Solich	Nebraska, Ohio	1998	2020	22	274	173	101	0	.631	2024
Steve Spurrier	Duke, Florida, South Carolina	1987	2015	26	319	228	89	2	.718	2017
Amos Alonzo Stagg	Springfield, Chicago, Pacific	1890	1946	57	548	314	199	35	.605	1951
Gene Stallings	Texas A&M, Alabama	1965	1996	14	160	97	61	2	.613	2010
Gil Steinke	Texas A&I	1954	1976	23	247	181	62	4	.741	1986
Bob Stoops	Oklahoma	1999	2016	17	238	190	48	0	.798	2021
Dick Strahm	Findlay	1975	1998	24	252	183	64	5	.736	2004
Jock Sutherland	Lafayette, Pittsburgh	1919	1938	20	186	144	28	14	.812	1951
Barry Switzer	Oklahoma	1973	1988	16	190	157	29	4	.837	2001
Andy Talley	St. Lawrence (NY), Villanova	1979	2016	37	414	258	155	2	.623	2020
Jim Tatum	North Carolina, Oklahoma, Maryland	1942	1958	14	142	100	35	7	.729	1984
Joe Taylor	Howard, Virginia Union, Hampton, Florida A&M	1983	2012	30	333	233	96	4	.706	2019
Grant Teaff	McMurry, Angelo State, Baylor	1960	1992	30	329	170	151	8	.529	2001
Mel Tjeerdsma	Austin, Northwest Missouri State	1984	2010	26	332	246	82	4	.747	2018
Frank Thomas	Chattanooga, Alabama	1925	1946	19	183	141	33	9	.795	1951
Jim Tressel	Youngstown State, Ohio State	1986	2010	25	310	229	79	2	.742	2015
Lee Tressel	Baldwin–Wallace	1958	1980	23	213	155	52	6	.742	1996
Thad Vann	Southern Miss	1949	1968	20	200	139	59	2	.700	1987
Johnny Vaught	Ole Miss	1947	1973	25	273	190	61	12	.745	1979
Wallace Wade	Alabama, Duke	1923	1950	24	230	171	49	10	.765	1955
Pappy Waldorf	Oklahoma City, Oklahoma State, Kansas State, Northwestern, California	1925	1956	31	296	174	100	22	.625	1966
Pop Warner	Georgia, Cornell, Carlisle, Pittsburgh, Stanford, Temple	1895	1938	44	457	319	106	32	.733	1951
Muddy Waters	Hillsdale, Saginaw Valley State, Michigan State	1954	1982	28	276	173	96	7	.639	2000
George Welsh	Navy, Virginia	1973	2000	28	325	189	132	4	.588	2004
Frosty Westering	Parsons, Lea, Pacific Lutheran	1962	2003	40	406	303	96	7	.755	2005
Tad Wieman	Michigan, Princeton	1927	1942	6	57	29	24	4	.544	1956
John Wilce	Ohio State	1913	1928	16	120	78	33	9	.689	1954
Bud Wilkinson	Oklahoma	1947	1963	17	178	145	29	4	.826	1969
Henry L. Williams	Army, Minnesota	1891	1921	23	187	141	34	12	.786	1951
George Washington Woodruff	Penn, Illinois, Carlisle	1892	1905	12	169	142	25	2	.846	1963
Warren B. Woodson	Central Arkansas, Hardin–Simmons, Arizona, New Mexico State, Trinity (TX)	1935	1973	31	310	202	94	14	.674	1989
Bowden Wyatt	Wyoming, Arkansas, Tennessee	1947	1962	16	160	99	56	5	.634	1997
Bill Yeoman	Houston	1962	1986	25	276	160	108	8	.594	2001
Fielding H. Yost	Ohio Wesleyan, Nebraska, Kansas, Stanford, Michigan	1898	1926	28	236	198	35	12	.833	1951
Jim Young	Arizona, Purdue, Army	1973	1990	17	193	120	71	2	.627	1999
Robert Zuppke	Illinois	1913	1941	29	225	131	81	12	.612	1951

== See also ==
- List of College Football Hall of Fame inductees (players)
