= List of college football career coaching wins leaders =

This is a list of college football coaches who are the leaders in career wins. It is limited to coaches who have won at least 200 games at a four-year college or university program in either the National Association of Intercollegiate Athletics (NAIA) or the National Collegiate Athletic Association (NCAA). If a team competed at a time before the official organization of either of the two groups but is generally accepted as a "college football program", it is included.

== Historical overview ==
As of the end of the end of the 2025 season, a total of 103 head football coaches have reached the milestone of 200 career coaching wins.

In the 100 years after the first college football game in 1869, only eight coaches reached the 200-win milestone. The only two who reached the mark before 1950 were Pop Warner, with 319 wins from 1895 to 1938 (mostly at Carlisle, Pittsburgh and Stanford), and Amos Alonzo Stagg, with 314 wins from 1890 to 1946 (mostly at Chicago).

By 1970, another six coaches had reached the milestone: Ace Mumford, with 233 wins from 1924 to 1961 (mostly at Southern); Fred T. Long, with 222 wins from 1921 to 1965 (mostly at Wiley); Jess Neely, with 207 wins from 1924 to 1966 (mostly at Clemson and Rice); Cleve Abbott, with 203 wins at Tuskegee between 1923 and 1954; Jake Gaither, with 205 wins at Saint Paul's of Virginia in 1936 and Florida A&M from 1945 to 1969; and Eddie Anderson, with 201 wins from 1922 to 1964 (mostly at Holy Cross).

Though only eight coaches reached the milestone from 1869 to 1970, 95 coaches have reached the mark since then.

== Leaders by category ==
In overall career wins, the all-time leader is John Gagliardi with 489 wins, mostly at the NCAA Division III level. Gagliardi began his head coaching career at Carroll in Helena, Montana in 1949 and moved in 1953 to Saint John's in Collegeville, Minnesota, where he served until retiring after the 2012 season. Joe Paterno, the head coach at Penn State from 1966 until his 2011 firing in the wake of the Jerry Sandusky child molestation scandal, is second with 409 wins. NCAA sanctions following the scandal had, in 2012, vacated of all 111 Penn State wins between 1998 and 2011, but the NCAA restored those wins on January 16, 2015 as part of a settlement of a lawsuit by the state of Pennsylvania against the NCAA. Eddie Robinson, head coach at Grambling State from 1941 to 1997 with a two-season hiatus during World War II in which Grambling did not field a team, is third with 408. Bobby Bowden is fourth with 377 wins.

Among the coaches with 200 career wins, Larry Kehres has the highest winning percentage with .929 in 27 seasons (1986–2012) as the head football coach at Mount Union in Alliance, Ohio. Seven others finished their careers with 200 wins and a winning percentage of .800 or greater: Pete Fredenburg (.856), Tom Osborne (.836), Jake Gaither (.827), Mike Kelly (.819), Joe Fincham (.815), Ron Schipper (.808), and Nick Saban (.804). One active coach has 200 wins and a winning percentage of .800 or greater: Steve Ryan (.833).

Among coaches with at least ten seasons in NCAA Division I and its predecessors, the all-time leaders in wins are Paterno (409), Robinson (408), Bowden (377), Bear Bryant (323), and Pop Warner (319).

Considering wins in Division I FBS only—including wins with "major" programs before the 1978 split of Division I football, and wins in Division I-A/FBS after the split—the all-time leaders are Paterno (409), Bowden (377), Bryant (323), Warner (319), and Amos Alonzo Stagg (314).

The only coaches with 200 Division I FCS wins after the Division I split are Jimmye Laycock (242), Roy Kidd (223), Andy Talley (217), and Jerry Moore (215).

The all-time win leaders in NCAA Division II are Danny Hale (Bloomsburg and West Chester), Gaither and Chuck Broyles, and the all-time win leaders in NCAA Division III are Gagliardi and Kehres.

Among coaches expected to be active in 2026, the career wins leaders are K. C. Keeler (279), Steve Ryan (249), and Mike Feminis (227).

The coaches with the most wins at one college are Gagliardi (465 at Saint John's), Paterno (409 at Penn State), Robinson (408 at Grambling), Kehres (332 at Mount Union), Ken Sparks (327 at Carson–Newman), Kidd (314 at Eastern Kentucky), Bowden (304 at Florida State) and Tubby Raymond (300 at Delaware).

== Key ==
*	Expected to be active in the 2026 season
†	Inducted into the College Football Hall of Fame as a coach
††	Inducted into the College Football Hall of Fame as a player
†††	Inducted into the College Football Hall of Fame as both a player and a coach
	200 wins with a Division I program (or historic equivalent) (Note: The list includes coaches with 200 wins regardless of division. Coaches with 200 wins at a Division I school (or historic equivalents) are designated with the referenced peach shading. The referenced shading has also been used for coaches with historic programs that were among the elite programs of their era. For example, Amos Alonzo Stagg's wins with the University of Chicago are included.)

== Coaches with 200 career wins ==
Updated through end of 2025 season

Rank	Name	Years	Wins	Losses	Ties	Pct.	Teams
1	John Gagliardi^{†}	64	489	138	11	.775	Carroll (MT) (1949–1952), Saint John's (MN) (1953–2012)
2	Joe Paterno^{†}	46	409	136	3	.749	Penn State (1966–2011)
3	Eddie Robinson^{†} (Note: Although Robinson has 408 total wins at Grambling, he has only 154 NCAA Division I wins. Robinson's first two wins were before Grambling was an accredited college. When the NCAA first split into the University Division (predecessor to today's Division I) and College Division (predecessor to today's Divisions II and III) in 1956, Grambling became a member of the College Division, and remained at that level until the split of the College Division after the 1972 season. At that time, Grambling became a Division II school, and did not move to Division I until 1977. The following year, when Division I-AA was created, Grambling became a charter member of that group and has remained there to this day.)	55	408	165	15	.707	Grambling (1941–1942, 1945–1997)
4	Bobby Bowden^{†}	44	377 (Note: Bobby Bowden had 389 wins on the field. A March 6, 2009 NCAA ruling, which was appealed and then upheld on January 5, 2010, required Florida State to vacate 12 wins from the 2006 and 2007 seasons in relation to an academic scandal which resulted in using ineligible players.)	129	4	.743	Samford (1959–1962), West Virginia (1970–1975), Florida State (1976–2009)
5	Kevin Donley	46	356	157	1	.694	Anderson (IN) (1978–1981), Georgetown (KY) (1982–1992), California (PA) (1993–1996), Saint Francis (IN) (1998–2024)
6	Ken Sparks^{†}	37	338	99	2	.772	Carson–Newman (1980–2016)
7	Larry Kehres^{†}	27	332	24	3	.929	Mount Union (1986–2012)
8	Bear Bryant^{†}	38	323	85	17	.780	Maryland (1945), Kentucky (1946–1953), Texas A&M (1954–1957), Alabama (1958–1982)
9	Pop Warner^{†}	49	319	106	32	.730	Georgia (1895–1896), Iowa State (1895–1899), Cornell (1897–1898, 1904–1906), Carlisle (1899–1903, 1907–1914), Pittsburgh (1915–1923), Stanford (1924–1932), Temple (1933–1938)
10	Roy Kidd^{†}	39	314	124	8	.713	Eastern Kentucky (1964–2002)
10	Amos Alonzo Stagg^{†††}	57	314	199	35	.605	Springfield (1890–1891), Chicago (1892–1932), Pacific (CA) (1933–1946)
12	Frosty Westering^{†}	40	305	96	7	.756	Parsons (1962–1963), Lea (1966–1971), Pacific Lutheran (1972–2003)
12	Larry Wilcox	42	305	153	0	.666	Benedictine (KS) (1979–2020)
14	Tubby Raymond^{†} (Note: Although Raymond has 300 total wins at Delaware, he has only 181 NCAA Division I wins. From 1966 to 1972, Delaware was in the College Division, and once the NCAA adopted its current three-division setup in 1973, Delaware became a Division II school. Delaware did not move to Division I-AA until 1980; they have remained at that level ever since.)	36	300	119	3	.714	Delaware (1966–2001)
15	Brian Kelly^{*}	35	297 (Note: In 2018, Notre Dame was forced to vacate all 13 games from the 2012 season, including their loss in the BCS National Championship Game, and all 9 wins from the 2013 season, including their victory in the Pinstripe Bowl.)	109	2	.730	Grand Valley State (1991–2003), Central Michigan (2004–2006), Cincinnati (2006–2009), Notre Dame (2010–2021), LSU (2022–2025)
16	Nick Saban^{†}	28	292 (Note: Nick Saban had five wins vacated from the 2007 season in relation to an academic scandal regarding textbooks. Four football players were found to have used their scholarships to obtain free textbooks for friends and/or girlfriends.)	71	1	.804	Toledo (1990), Michigan State (1995–1999), LSU (2000–2004), Alabama (2007–2023)
17	Mack Brown^{†}	36	288	155	1	.650	Appalachian State (1983), Tulane (1985–1987), North Carolina (1988–1997, 2019–2024), Texas (1998–2013)
18	Ron Schipper^{†}	36	287	67	3	.808	Central (IA) (1961–1996)
19	Frank Beamer^{†}	35	280	144	4	.657	Murray State (1981–1986), Virginia Tech (1987–2015)
20	K. C. Keeler^{*}	32	276	119	1	.698	Rowan (1993–2001), Delaware (2002–2012), Sam Houston State (2014–2024), Temple (2025–present)
21	Monte Cater^{†}	37	275	117	2	.701	Lakeland (1981–1986), Shepherd (1987–2017)
22	Al Bagnoli	40	269	134	0	.667	Union (NY) (1982–1991), Penn (1992–2014), Columbia (2015–2022)
22	Bob Ford (Note: Although Ford has 265 total wins and 256 at Albany, he only has 98 NCAA Division I wins. Ford's first nine wins were at St. Lawrence, which was then in the College Division and is now in Division III. When Albany reinstated varsity football in 1973 with Ford as head coach, it did so as a Division III program; it joined Division II in 1995 and did not move to Division I-AA (now FCS) until 1999.)	45	265	191	1	.581	St. Lawrence (1965–1968), Albany (1973–2013)
24	Dennis Douds	45	264	204	3	.564	East Stroudsburg (1974–2018)
25	Roger Harring^{†}	31	261	75	7	.771	Wisconsin–La Crosse (1969–1999)
26	Rick Giancola	39	260	143	2	.644	Montclair State (1983–2022)
27	Hank Biesiot	38	258	121	1	.680	Dickinson State (1976–2013)
28	LaVell Edwards^{†}	29	257	101	3	.716	BYU (1972–2000)
28	Frank Girardi^{†}	36	257	97	5	.723	Lycoming (1972–2007)
28	Andy Talley^{†}	37	257	155	2	.623	St. Lawrence (1979–83), Villanova (1985–2016)
31	Jim Malosky	40	255	125	13	.665	Minnesota–Duluth (1958–1997)
31	Tom Osborne^{†}	25	255	49	3	.836	Nebraska (1973–1997)
33	Steve Johnson	34	252	110	1	.696	Bethel (MN) (1989–2023)
34	Lou Holtz^{†}	33	249	132	7	.651	William & Mary (1969–1971), North Carolina State (1972–1975), Arkansas (1977–1983), Minnesota (1984–1985), Notre Dame (1986–1996), South Carolina (1999–2004)
34	Jimmye Laycock	39	249	194	2	.562	William & Mary (1980–2018)
34	Steve Ryan^{*}	24	249	50	0	.833	Morningside (2002–present)
37	Rob Ash	36	246	137	5	.640	Juniata (1980–1988), Drake (1989–2006), Montana State (2007–2015)
37	Mike Kelly^{†}	27	246	54	1	.819	Dayton (1981–2007)
39	Billy Joe^{†} (Note: Although Joe has 245 wins, only 86 came at Division I Florida A&M; all other victories were with lower division programs.)	34	245	127	4	.657	Cheyney (1972–1978), Central State (1981–1993), Florida A&M (1994–2004), Miles (2008–2010)
40	Jerry Moore^{†}	31	242	135	2	.641	North Texas (1979–1980), Texas Tech (1981–1985), Appalachian State (1989–2012)
40	Mel Tjeerdsma^{†}	27	242	82	4	.744	Austin (1984–1993), Northwest Missouri State (1994–2010)
42	Bob Nielson	32	239	128	1	.651	Ripon (1989–1990), Wartburg (1991–1995), Wisconsin–Eau Claire (1996–1998), Minnesota–Duluth (1999–2003, 2008–2012), Western Illinois (2013–2015), South Dakota (2016–2024)
43	Woody Hayes^{†}	33	238	72	10	.759	Denison (1946–1948), Miami (OH) (1949–1950), Ohio State (1951–1978)
44	John Merritt^{†}	32	235	70	12	.760	Jackson State (1952–1962), Tennessee State (1963–1983)
45	Chris Ault^{†}	28	234 (Note: In 1985, UNLV was forced to forfeit all 7 games from the 1983 season and all 11 wins from the 1984 season, including their victory in the California Bowl. Ault and his team were given a win as a result.)	108	1	.684	Nevada (1976–1992, 1994–1995, 2004–2012)
45	Rich Lackner	36	234	125	2	.651	Carnegie Mellon (1986–2021)
45	Bo Schembechler^{†}	27	234	65	8	.775	Miami (OH) (1963–1968), Michigan (1969–1989)
48	Ace Mumford^{†}	36	233	85	23	.717	Jarvis Christian (1924–1926), Bishop (1927–1929), Texas College (1931–1935), Southern (1936–1942, 1944–1961)
48	Joe Taylor	30	233	96	4	.706	Howard (1983), Virginia Union (1984–1991), Hampton (1992–2007), Florida A&M (2008–2012)
50	Norm Eash	38	232	134	1	.634	Illinois Wesleyan (1987–2024)
50	Hayden Fry^{†}	37	232	178	10	.564	SMU (1962–1972), North Texas (1973–1978), Iowa (1979–1998)
50	Tim Murphy	36	232	134	1	.634	Maine (1987–1988), Cincinnati (1989–1993), Harvard (1994–2023)
53	Pete Fredenburg	24	231	39	0	.856	Mary Hardin–Baylor (1998–2021)
54	Willard Bailey	37	230	150	7	.603	Virginia Union (1971–1983, 1995–2003), Norfolk State (1984–1992), Saint Paul's (VA) (2005–2010)
55	Mike Drass	25	229	61	1	.789	Wesley (DE) (1993–2017)
55	Jim Tressel^{†}	25	229	79	2	.742	Youngstown State (1986–2000), Ohio State (2001–2010)
57	Steve Spurrier^{†††}	26	228	89	2	.718	Duke (1987–1989), Florida (1990–2001), South Carolina (2005–2015)
58	Mike Feminis^{*}	27	227	91	0	.714	Saint Xavier (1999–present)
59	John Luckhardt^{†}	27	225	70	2	.761	Washington & Jefferson (1982–1998), California (PA) (2002–2011)
60	Joe Fincham	25	224	51	0	.815	Wittenberg (1996–2021)
60	Sherman Wood^{*}	33	224	121	1	.649	Bowie State (1993–1998), Salisbury (1999–present)
62	Walt Hameline (Note: Although Hameline has 223 total wins, all at Wagner, he has only 128 NCAA Division I wins. Wagner was a Division III school when he became head coach in 1981, and did not upgrade to the I-AA/FCS level until 1993.)	34	223	139	2	.615	Wagner (1981–2014)
63	Fred T. Long	44	222	148	32	.592	Paul Quinn (1921–1922), Wiley (1923–1947, 1956–1965), Prairie View A&M (1948), Texas College (1949–1954)
63	Willie Fritz^{*}	29	222	127	0	.636	Central Missouri Mules (1997–2009), Sam Houston State (2010–2013), Georgia Southern (2014–2015), Tulane (2016–2023), Houston (2024–present)
65	Kirk Ferentz^{*}	30	221 (Note: In 2026, Iowa was forced to vacate 4 wins from the 2023 season, due to the Hawkeyes tampering with Cade McNamara when he was in the transfer portal.)	149	0	.597	Maine (1990–1992), Iowa (1999–present)
65	Jim Margraff^{†}	29	221	89	3	.711	Johns Hopkins (1990–2018)
67	Gene Carpenter^{†}	32	220	90	6	.706	Adams State (1968), Millersville (1970–2000)
68	Larry Kindbom	37	220	149	1	.596	Kenyon (1983–1988), Washington (MO) (1989–2019)
69	Ted Kessinger^{†}	28	219	57	1	.792	Bethany (KS) (1976–2003)
70	Mike Ayers	33	218	160	2	.577	East Tennessee State (1985–1987), Wofford (1988–2017)
70	Bill Cronin	25	218	65	0	.770	Georgetown (KY) (1997–2021)
70	Ron Harms^{†}	31	218	112	5	.658	Concordia (NE) (1964–1969), Adams State (1970–1973), Texas A&M–Kingsville (1979–1999)
70	Ron Randleman	36	218	167	6	.565	William Penn (1969–1975), Pittsburg State (1976–1981), Sam Houston State (1982–2004)
74	Jim Christopherson	32	217	102	7	.676	Concordia (Moorhead) (1969–2000)
74	Fred Martinelli^{†}	35	217	119	12	.641	Ashland (1959–1993)
74	Bill Zwaan	25	217	90	0	.707	Widener (1997–2002), West Chester (2003–2023)
77	Bill Snyder^{†}	27	215	117	1	.647	Kansas State (1989–2005, 2009–2018)
78	Dennis Franchione	30	213	135	2	.611	Southwestern (KS) (1981–1982), Pittsburg State (1985–1989), Texas State (1990–1991), New Mexico (1992–1997), TCU (1998–2000), Alabama (2001–2002), Texas A&M (2003–2007), Texas State (2011–2015)
78	Danny Hale^{†}	25	213	69	1	.754	West Chester (1984–1988), Bloomsburg (1993–2012)
80	Eric Hamilton	36	212	144	6	.594	TCNJ (1977–2012)
80	Larry Korver^{†}	29	212	77	7	.729	Northwestern (IA) (1968–1994)
80	Bill Manlove^{†}	32	212	111	1	.656	Widener (1969–1991), Delaware Valley (1992–1995), La Salle (1997–2001)
83	Peter Mazzaferro	41	209	158	11	.567	Waynesburg (1959–1963), Curry (1963), Bridgewater State (1968–1986, 1988–2004)
83	Mike Swider	24	209	52	0	.798	Wheaton (IL) (1996–2019)
85	Jess Neely^{†}	40	207	176	19	.539	Southwestern (TN) (1924–1927), Clemson (1931–1939), Rice (1940–1966)
86	Jim Butterfield^{†}	27	206	71	1	.743	Ithaca (1967–1993)
86	Mike Maynard	32	206	91	1	.693	Redlands (1988–2021)
88	Harold Elliott	37	205	179	9	.533	Southwestern (KS) (1964–1968), Washburn (1969–1970), Emporia State (1971–1973), Texas–Arlington (1974–1983), Northwest Missouri State (1988–1993), Eastern New Mexico (1994–2004)
88	Jake Gaither^{†} (Note: Although Gaither had 203 wins at Florida A&M, FAMU did not move up to Division I until the creation of I-AA football in 1978, nine years after Gaither retired.)	25	205	36	4	.827	Saint Paul's (VA) (1936), Florida A&M (1945–1969)
88	Carl Poelker	31	205	100	1	.672	Millikin (1982–1995), McKendree (1996–2012)
91	Cleve Abbott	31	203	96	28	.664	Tuskegee (1923–1954)
91	Mike Van Diest	20	203	54	0	.790	Carroll (MT) (1999–2018)
91	Warren B. Woodson^{†}	31	203	95	14	.673	Arkansas State Teachers (1935–1940), Hardin–Simmons (1941–1942, 1946–1951), Arizona (1952–1956), New Mexico State (1958–1967), Trinity (TX) (1972–1973)
94	Don Nehlen^{†}	30	202	128	8	.609	Bowling Green (1968–1976), West Virginia (1980–2000)
94	Mike Sirianni^{*}	23	202	49	0	.805	Washington & Jefferson (2003–present)
96	Eddie Anderson^{†}	39	201	128	15	.606	Loras (1922–1924), DePaul (1925–1931), Holy Cross (1933–1938, 1950–1964) Iowa (1939–1942, 1946–1949)
96	Mike DeLong	34	201	139	2	.591	Maine Maritime (1979–1980), Springfield (1984–2015)
96	Vince Dooley^{†}	25	201	77	10	.715	Georgia (1964–1988)
96	Keith W. Piper	39	201	141	18	.583	Denison (1954–1992)
100	Chris Creighton^{*}	29	200	129	0	.608	Ottawa (KS) (1997–2000), Wabash (2001–2007), Drake (2008–2013), Eastern Michigan (2014–present)
100	Joe Glenn	28	200	134	1	.599	Doane (1976–1979), Northern Colorado (1989–1999), Montana (2000–2002), Wyoming (2003–2008), South Dakota (2012–2015)
100	Darrell Mudra^{†}	26	200	81	4	.709	Adams State (1959–1962), North Dakota State (1963–1965), Arizona (1967–1968), Western Illinois (1969–1973), Florida State (1974–1975), Eastern Illinois (1978–1982), Northern Iowa (1983–1987)
100	Jim Sweeney	32	200	154	4	.564	Montana State (1963–1967), Washington State (1968–1975), Fresno State (1976–1977, 1980–1996)

== Active coaches nearing 200 career wins ==
This list identifies active coaches with at least 175 career wins; updated through end of 2025 season

Rank	Name	Years	Wins	Losses	Ties	Pct.	Teams
^{*}	Todd Knight	32	197	140	2	.584	Delta State (1993–1998), Ouachita Baptist Tigers (1999–present)
^{*}	Todd Hoffner	22	194	69	0	.738	Wisconsin–Eau Claire (1999–2005), Minnesota State (2008–2011, 2014–present)
^{*}	Rich Rodriguez	28	194	129	2	.586	Salem (1988), Glenville State (1990–1996), West Virginia (2001–2007), Michigan (2008–2010), Arizona (2012–2017), Jacksonville State Gamecocks (2022–2024), West Virginia (2025–present)
^{*}	Dabo Swinney	18	187	53	0	.779	Clemson (2008–present)
^{*}	Andy Frye	28	185	93	0	.665	Centre (1998–present)
^{*}	Kyle Whittingham	21	177	88	1	.668	Utah (2005–2025), Michigan (2026–present)
^{*}	Dave Murray	35	176	170	1	.509	Cortland (1990–1996), Lebanon Valley (1997), Alfred (1998–2013), Hamilton (2014–present)

== See also ==
- List of college football career coaching winning percentage leaders
- List of college football career coaching losses leaders
- List of college football seasons coached leaders
- List of NFL head coach wins leaders
