= Mike Maynard =

American football coach (born 1956)

Biographical details
- Born: c. 1956 (age 69–70)

Coaching career (HC unless noted)
- 1985–1987: Claremont-Mudd-Scripps (assistant)
- 1988–2020: Redlands

Head coaching record
- Overall: 206–91–1
- Tournaments: 0–9 (NCAA D-III playoffs)

Accomplishments and honors

Championships
- 13 SCIAC (1990–1992, 1996–1997, 1999–2000, 2002–2003, 2007, 2013, 2016, 2018)

Michael Maynard (born c. 1956) is an American former college football coach. He was the head football coach at the University of Redlands in Redlands, California from 1988 until his retirement in the spring of 2021, compiling a record of 206–91–1. Maynard was previously a football coach for the Claremont-Mudd-Scripps joint athletic program.

== Awards ==
In 1990, he was awarded the American Football Coaches’ Association West Region Coach of the Year. In 2005, he became a University of Redlands Bulldog Bench Intercollegiate Athletics Hall of Famer, and in 2007 received the All-American Football Foundation Johnny Vaught Head Coach Award.

== Head coaching record ==
Year	Team	Overall	Conference	Standing	Bowl/playoffs
Redlands Bulldogs (Southern California Intercollegiate Athletic Conference) (1988–2021)
1988	Redlands	5–4	4–1 (Note: From 1984 to 1990, the Southern California Intercollegiate Athletic Conference (SCIAC) football schedule included multiple head-to-head meetings each season. In 1984 and 1985, each conference member played two other conference members twice. From 1986 to 1990, each conference member played one other conference member twice. A head-to-head sweep of the two games in one season counted as one win for the winner and one loss for the loser in the conference standings. A split of the two games counted as a tie for each team.)	2nd	
1989	Redlands	4–5	3–1–1	T–2nd	
1990	Redlands	8–2	5–0	1st	L NCAA Division III First Round
1991	Redlands	7–2	5–1	1st	
1992	Redlands	8–2	6–0	1st	L NCAA Division III First Round
1993	Redlands	6–3	4–2	3rd	
1994	Redlands	6–2–1	5–1	2nd	
1995	Redlands	4–5	3–3	3rd	
1996	Redlands	6–3	5–0	1st	
1997	Redlands	7–2	4–1	T–1st	
1998	Redlands	7–2	4–1	2nd	
1999	Redlands	7–2	5–0	1st	
2000	Redlands	7–2	5–0	1st	
2001	Redlands	5–3	3–2	T–2nd	
2002	Redlands	7–3	5–0	1st	L NCAA Division III First Round
2003	Redlands	6–4	5–1	1st	L NCAA Division III First Round
2004	Redlands	4–5	3–3	T–3rd	
2005	Redlands	5–4	4–2	3rd	
2006	Redlands	4–5	4–2	2nd	
2007	Redlands	8–2	5–1	T–1st	L NCAA Division III First Round
2008	Redlands	7–2	4–2	3rd	
2009	Redlands	7–2	4–2	3rd	
2010	Redlands	8–1	5–1	2nd	
2011	Redlands	8–2	5–1	2nd	L NCAA Division III First Round
2012	Redlands	6–3	6–1	2nd	
2013	Redlands	7–3	7–0	1st	L NCAA Division III First Round
2014	Redlands	6–3	6–1	2nd	
2015	Redlands	4–5	4–3	T–3rd	
2016	Redlands	8–2	7–0	1st	L NCAA Division III First Round
2017	Redlands	7–2	5–1	2nd	
2018	Redlands	8–2	6–1	T–1st	
2019	Redlands	9–2	6–1	2nd	L NCAA Division III First Round
2020–21	No team—COVID-19				
Redlands:		206–91–1	152–36–1		
Total:		206–91–1			
National championship Conference title Conference division title or championship game berth

== See also ==
- List of college football career coaching wins leaders
