= Rod Grubb =

American football coach

Biographical details
- Died: July 18, 2005

Playing career
- 1949–1952: Concordia–Moorhead

Coaching career (HC unless noted)
- 1974–1989: St. Olaf (assistant)
- 1996: St. Olaf (interim HC)

Head coaching record
- Overall: 2–8

Rodney Grubb (died July 18, 2005) was an American football coach and player. He served as the interim head football coach at St. Olaf College in Northfield, Minnesota for one season in 1996, following the death of head coach Don Canfield. Grubb had served as an assistant at St. Olaf from 1974 to 1989.

== Head coaching record ==
Year	Team	Overall	Conference	Standing	Bowl/playoffs
St. Olaf Oles (Minnesota Intercollegiate Athletic Conference) (1996)
1996	St. Olaf	2–8	1–8	10th	
St. Olaf:		2–8	1–8		
Total:		2–8			
