= Danny Hale (disambiguation) =

- Danny Hale (1941–2026), Northern Irish footballer

Danny Hale may also refer to:

- Danny Hale (American football) (born 1946), American football player and coach
