= Joe Fincham =

American football player and coach (born 1964)

Biographical details
- Born: October 6, 1964 (age 62); Williamstown, West Virginia, U.S.

Playing career
- 1983–1986: Ohio

Coaching career (HC unless noted)
- 1987–1988: Ohio (GA)
- 1989–1990: Urbana (OC)
- 1991–1995: Wittenberg (OC/OL)
- 1996–2021: Wittenberg

Head coaching record
- Overall: 224–51
- Tournaments: 12–13 (NCAA D-III playoffs)

Accomplishments and honors

Championships
- 15 NCAC (1997–2001, 2006, 2009–2010, 2012–2014, 2016–2019)

Joe Fincham (born October 6, 1964) is an American former football coach. He served as the head football coach at Wittenberg University in Springfield, Ohio from 1996 to 2021, compiling a record of 224–51. Fincham played football at Ohio University from 1983 to 1986. On September 25, 2010, Fincham won his 130th game, passing Dave Maurer for the most wins in Wittenberg Tigers football history.

== Head coaching record ==
| Year | Team | Overall | Conference | Standing | Bowl/playoffs |
|---|---|---|---|---|---|
Wittenberg Tigers (North Coast Athletic Conference) (1996–2021)
| 1996 | Wittenberg | 9–1 | 7–1 | 2nd | |
| 1997 | Wittenberg | 9–1 | 7–1 | T–1st | |
| 1998 | Wittenberg | 11–1 | 8–0 | 1st | L NCAA Division III Second Round |
| 1999 | Wittenberg | 11–1 | 6–0 | 1st | L NCAA Division III Second Round |
| 2000 | Wittenberg | 12–1 | 7–0 | 1st | L NCAA Division III Quarterfinal |
| 2001 | Wittenberg | 11–2 | 7–0 | 1st | L NCAA Division III Quarterfinal |
| 2002 | Wittenberg | 10–2 | 6–1 | 2nd | L NCAA Division III Second Round |
| 2003 | Wittenberg | 8–2 | 4–2 | T–2nd | |
| 2004 | Wittenberg | 7–3 | 5–2 | T–2nd | |
| 2005 | Wittenberg | 5–5 | 5–2 | T–3rd | |
| 2006 | Wittenberg | 7–4 | 6–1 | T–1st | L NCAA Division III First Round |
| 2007 | Wittenberg | 8–2 | 6–1 | 2nd | |
| 2008 | Wittenberg | 6–4 | 4–3 | T–3rd | |
| 2009 | Wittenberg | 12–1 | 7–0 | 1st | L NCAA Division III Quarterfinal |
| 2010 | Wittenberg | 10–1 | 6–0 | 1st | L NCAA Division III First Round |
| 2011 | Wittenberg | 8–2 | 5–1 | 2nd | |
| 2012 | Wittenberg | 10–2 | 6–1 | T–1st | L NCAA Division III Second Round |
| 2013 | Wittenberg | 10–2 | 9–0 | 1st | L NCAA Division III Second Round |
| 2014 | Wittenberg | 9–2 | 9–0 | T–1st | L NCAA Division III First Round |
| 2015 | Wittenberg | 8–2 | 7–2 | T–2nd | |
| 2016 | Wittenberg | 10–2 | 8–1 | 1st | L NCAA Division III Second Round |
| 2017 | Wittenberg | 10–1 | 9–0 | 1st | L NCAA Division III First Round |
| 2018 | Wittenberg | 9–1 | 8–1 | T–1st | |
| 2019 | Wittenberg | 7–3 | 7–2 | T–1st | |
| 2020–21 | No team—COVID-19 | | | | |
| 2021 | Wittenberg | 7–3 | 7–2 | T–2nd | |
| Wittenberg: | | 224–51 | 166–24 | | |
| Total: | | 224–51 | | | |
National championship Conference title Conference division title or championship game berth

== See also ==
- List of college football career coaching wins leaders
