= Rick Giancola =

American football coach (born 1946)

Biographical details
- Born: September 18, 1946 (age 80)

Coaching career (HC unless noted)
- 1975–1982: Montclair State (assistant)
- 1983–2022: Montclair State

Head coaching record
- Overall: 260–143–2
- Bowls: 3–2
- Tournaments: 8–9 (NCAA D-III playoffs)

Accomplishments and honors

Championships
- 11 NJAC (1983–1986, 1989, 1999–2000, 2003, 2009–2010, 2014)

Awards
- 9× NJAC Coach of the Year

Enrico "Rick" Giancola (born September 18, 1946) is an American former college football coach. He served as the head football coach at Montclair State University in Montclair, New Jersey from 1983 to 2022, compiling a record of 260–143–2. He is the longest-tenured coach in history of the Montclair State Red Hawks football program and has the most wins of any coach in program history. Giancola's teams won 11 New Jersey Athletic Conference (NJAC) championships.

== Head coaching record ==
Year	Team	Overall	Conference	Standing	Bowl/playoffs
Montclair State Indians / Red Hawks (New Jersey Athletic Conference) (1983–2022)
1983	Montclair State	7–2–1	5–1	T–1st	
1984	Montclair State	7–3	6–0	1st	
1985	Montclair State	10–2	6–0	1st	L NCAA Division III Semifinal
1986	Montclair State	10–2	6–0	1st	L NCAA Division III Quarterfinal
1987	Montclair State	8–2	5–1	2nd	
1988	Montclair State	8–2	5–1	2nd	
1989	Montclair State	9–2–1	5–0–1	1st	L NCAA Division III Quarterfinal
1990	Montclair State	7–3	4–2	3rd	
1991	Montclair State	5–5	3–3	4th	
1992	Montclair State	6–3	5–1	2nd	
1993	Montclair State	7–3	3–2	3rd	W ECAC Southwest Bowl
1994	Montclair State	4–6	2–3	4th	
1995	Montclair State	3–6	2–3	4th	
1996	Montclair State	4–6	2–3	4th	
1997	Montclair State	6–4	3–2	3rd	
1998	Montclair State	8–3	3–2	3rd	W ECAC Southeast Bowl
1999	Montclair State	9–2	5–0	1st	L NCAA Division III Quarterfinal
2000	Montclair State	7–3	6–0	1st	L NCAA Division III First Round
2001	Montclair State	9–2	4–1	2nd	L NCAA Division III First Round
2002	Montclair State	5–5	4–2	3rd	
2003	Montclair State	9–2	5–0	1st	L NCAA Division III Second Round
2004	Montclair State	4–4	2–4	5th	
2005	Montclair State	5–5	4–2	3rd	L ECAC South Atlantic Bowl
2006	Montclair State	7–3	5–2	3rd	
2007	Montclair State	9–2	5–2	3rd	W ECAC South Atlantic Bowl
2008	Montclair State	8–3	7–2	2nd	L ECAC South Central Bowl
2009	Montclair State	10–2	9–0	1st	L NCAA Division III Second Round
2010	Montclair State	10–2	8–1	T–1st	L NCAA Division III Second Round
2011	Montclair State	8–2	7–2	T–2nd	
2012	Montclair State	5–5	5–3	4th	
2013	Montclair State	4–6	3–4	5th	
2014	Montclair State	8–2	6–1	T–1st	
2015	Montclair State	4–6	4–5	T–7th	
2016	Montclair State	4–6	3–6	7th	
2017	Montclair State	5–5	5–4	4th	
2018	Montclair State	8–2	7–2	T–2nd	
2019	Montclair State	6–4	5–2	3rd	
2020–21	Montclair State	2–1	2–1	T–2nd	
2021	Montclair State	3–7	2–4	T–4th	
2022	Montclair State	2–8	0–6	7th	
Montclair State:		260–143–2	178–80–1		
Total:		260–143–2			
National championship Conference title Conference division title or championship game berth

== See also ==
- List of college football career coaching wins leaders
