= Larry Kindbom =

American sports coach (born 1952)

Biographical details
- Born: October 20, 1952 (age 74)

Playing career

Football
- 1971–1973: Kalamazoo
- Position: Cornerback

Coaching career (HC unless noted)

Football
- 1977–1978: Ohio State (GA)
- 1979–1982: Akron (assistant)
- 1983–1988: Kenyon
- 1989–2019: Washington University
- 2020–2023: Washington University (ST/DB)

Baseball
- 1984–1988: Kenyon

Head coaching record
- Overall: 220–149–1 (football); 35–118 (baseball)
- Tournaments: Football; 0–3 (NCAA D-III playoffs)

Accomplishments and honors

Championships
- Football; 12 UAA (1994, 1995, 1996, 1999, 2001, 2002, 2003, 2004, 2012, 2013, 2015, 2016); 1 SAA (2016)

Awards
- 8 UAA Coaching Staff of the Year (1995, 1999, 2001, 2002, 2003, 2004, 2012, 2013, 2015, 2016); Bob Reade CCIW Coach of the Year (2018); D3football.com North Region Coach of the Year (2018); AFCA Region 4 Coach of the Year (2018); Allstate AFCA Good Works Team Honorary Coach (2018); NFF St. Louis Chapter Eddie Cochems Award (1994); AFCA Grant Teaff “Breaking the Silence” Award (2009); St. Louis FCA "Larry Kindbom Empowered Coach for Christ" award (2019)

Larry Kindbom (born October 20, 1952) is an American former college football and baseball coach. He served as the head football coach at Kenyon College in Gambier, Ohio from 1983 to 1988 and Washington University in St. Louis from 1989 to 2019, compiling a career college football coaching record of 220–149–1. Kindbom was also the head baseball coach at Kenyon from 1984 to 1988, tallying a mark of 35–118. He was a graduate assistant on the football staff at Ohio State University from 1977 to 1978 and an assistant football coach at the University of Akron from 1979 to 1982. On September 11, 2019, Kindbom announced his retirement following the 2019 season. He served as an assistant for four years on the Washington University staff before retiring again in 2023.

== Head coaching record ==
=== Football ===
Year	Team	Overall	Conference	Standing	Bowl/playoffs
Kenyon Lords (Ohio Athletic Conference) (1983)
1983	Kenyon	5–3–1	NA	NA	
Kenyon Lords (North Coast Athletic Conference) (1984–1988)
1984	Kenyon	7–3	4–2	T–2nd	
1985	Kenyon	4–6	4–2	3rd	
1986	Kenyon	4–6	2–4	5th	
1987	Kenyon	2–8	1–5	7th	
1988	Kenyon	6–4	4–2	T–2nd	
Kenyon:		28–30–1	15–15		
Washington University Bears (University Athletic Association) (1989–2014)
1989	Washington University	4–5	2–2	3rd	
1990	Washington University	7–3	2–2	T–2nd	
1991	Washington University	6–4	1–3	4th	
1992	Washington University	4–6	1–3	T–3rd	
1993	Washington University	6–4	1–3	4th	
1994	Washington University	7–3	3–1	T–1st	
1995	Washington University	9–1	3–1	T–1st	
1996	Washington University	7–3	3–1	T–1st	
1997	Washington University	6–4	3–1	2nd	
1998	Washington University	6–4	2–2	3rd	
1999	Washington University	8–3	4–0	1st	L NCAA Division III First Round
2000	Washington University	6–4	3–1	2nd	
2001	Washington University	8–2	4–0	1st	
2002	Washington University	6–4	4–0	1st	
2003	Washington University	6–4	4–0	1st	
2004	Washington University	6–4	3–0	1st	
2005	Washington University	6–4	2–1	2nd	
2006	Washington University	6–4	2–1	2nd	
2007	Washington University	7–3	1–2	3rd	
2008	Washington University	5–5	1–2	T–2nd	
2009	Washington University	4–6	1–2	T–2nd	
2010	Washington University	7–3	2–1	2nd	
2011	Washington University	6–4	2–1	2nd	
2012	Washington University	5–5	3–0	1st	
2013	Washington University	8–3	3–0	1st	L NCAA Division III First Round
2014	Washington University	4–6	1–2	T–2nd	
Washington University Bears (Southern Athletic Association/University Athletic Association) (2015–2016)
2015	Washington University	6–4	5–3 / 2–1	T–4th / T–1st	
2016	Washington University	8–3	7–1 / 2–1	T–1st / T–1st	L NCAA Division III First Round
Washington University Bears (University Athletic Association) (2017)
2017	Washington University	3–6	0–2	3rd	
Washington University Bears (College Conference of Illinois and Wisconsin) (2018–2019)
2018	Washington University	8–2	7–2	T–3rd	
2019	Washington University	7–3	6–3	T–3rd	
Washington University:		192–119	88–45		
Total:		220–149–1			
National championship Conference title Conference division title or championship game berth

== See also ==
- List of college football career coaching wins leaders
