= Norm Eash =

American football player and coach

Biographical details
- Born: c. 1953 (age 72–73)

Playing career
- 1971–1974: Illinois Wesleyan
- Positions: Defensive lineman, offensive tackle

Coaching career (HC unless noted)
- 1975–1981: Streator Township HS (IL) (assistant)
- 1982–1986: Dwight HS (IL)
- 1987–2024: Illinois Wesleyan

Head coaching record
- Overall: 232–134–1 (college); 34–15 (high school)
- Tournaments: 3–6 (NCAA D-III playoffs)

Accomplishments and honors

Championships
- 8 CCIW (1992, 1994, 1996, 2000–2001, 2007, 2009, 2017–2018)

Awards
- 6× CCIW Coach of the Year (1992, 1996, 2001, 2007, 2009, 2017)

Norm Eash (born c. 1953) is an American former college football coach. He was the head football coach for Illinois Wesleyan University from 1987 until his retirement after the 2024 season. Eash attended Illinois Wesleyan, where he lettered in football from 1971 to 1974. He began his coaching career at Streator Township High School in Streator, Illinois, served as offensive coordinator from 1975 to 1981. Eash then moved to Dwight High School in Dwight, Illinois, where he compiled a record of 34–15 in five seasons as head coach, from 1982 to 1986.

Eash won his 200th game as head coach at Illinois Wesleyan on November 11, 2017.

== Head coaching record ==
=== College ===
Year	Team	Overall	Conference	Standing	Bowl/playoffs	D3^{#}
Illinois Wesleyan Titans (College Conference of Illinois and Wisconsin) (1987–2024)
1987	Illinois Wesleyan	4–5	4–4	T–5th		
1988	Illinois Wesleyan	2–7	2–6	7th		
1989	Illinois Wesleyan	5–4	4–4	5th		
1990	Illinois Wesleyan	7–2	6–2	3rd		
1991	Illinois Wesleyan	7–1–1	6–1–1	T–2nd		
1992	Illinois Wesleyan	10–1	7–0	1st	L NCAA Division III Quarterfinal	
1993	Illinois Wesleyan	4–5	3–4	4th		
1994	Illinois Wesleyan	8–1	6–1	T–1st		
1995	Illinois Wesleyan	6–3	6–1	2nd		
1996	Illinois Wesleyan	10–1	7–0	1st	L NCAA Division III Quarterfinal	
1997	Illinois Wesleyan	7–2	5–2	2nd		
1998	Illinois Wesleyan	7–2	5–2	T–2nd		
1999	Illinois Wesleyan	6–3	4–3	T–4th		
2000	Illinois Wesleyan	9–1	6–1	T–1st		
2001	Illinois Wesleyan	7–2	6–1	T–1st		
2002	Illinois Wesleyan	6–4	3–4	T–5th		
2003	Illinois Wesleyan	5–5	3–4	T–5th		
2004	Illinois Wesleyan	3–7	2–5	6th		
2005	Illinois Wesleyan	3–7	2–5	T–6th		
2006	Illinois Wesleyan	3–7	2–5	T–6th		
2007	Illinois Wesleyan	7–3	6–1	T–1st		
2008	Illinois Wesleyan	6–4	3–4	T–5th		
2009	Illinois Wesleyan	10–2	6–1	T–1st	L NCAA Division III Second Round	9
2010	Illinois Wesleyan	7–3	4–3	T–3rd		
2011	Illinois Wesleyan	9–2	6–1	2nd	L NCAA Division III First Round	21
2012	Illinois Wesleyan	6–4	3–4	5th		
2013	Illinois Wesleyan	9–2	6–1	2nd	L NCAA Division III First Round	24
2014	Illinois Wesleyan	4–6	2–5	T–5th		
2015	Illinois Wesleyan	7–3	4–3	T–3rd		
2016	Illinois Wesleyan	7–2	6–2	3rd		
2017	Illinois Wesleyan	9–2	7–1	T–1st	L NCAA Division III First Round	17
2018	Illinois Wesleyan	8–2	8–1	T–1st		19
2019	Illinois Wesleyan	6–4	6–3	T–3rd		
2020–21	Illinois Wesleyan	2–1	2–1	T–2nd		
2021	Illinois Wesleyan	3–7	3–6	T–6th		
2022	Illinois Wesleyan	6–4	5–4	T–4th		
2023	Illinois Wesleyan	2–8	2–7	T–8th		
2024	Illinois Wesleyan	5–5	5–4	4th		
Illinois Wesleyan:		232–134–1	173–107–1			
Total:		232–134–1				
National championship Conference title Conference division title or championship game berth

== See also ==
- List of college football career coaching wins leaders
