= Eric Hamilton (American football) =

American football player and coach (born 1953)

Biographical details
- Born: September 19, 1953 (age 73); Bordentown, New Jersey, U.S.

Playing career
- 1971–1974: Trenton State
- Position: Center

Coaching career (HC unless noted)
- 1975–1976: Trenton State (GA)
- 1977–2012: Trenton State / TCNJ

Head coaching record
- Overall: 212–144–6
- Tournaments: 4–5 (NCAA D-III playoffs)

Accomplishments and honors

Championships
- 7 NJSAC/NJAC (1980, 1983, 1988, 1990, 1994, 1996, 2007)

Eric Hamilton (born September 19, 1953) is an American former college football coach. He served as head football coach at The College of New Jersey from 1977 to 2012, compiling a record of 212–144–6.

== Athlete ==
A native of Bordentown, New Jersey, Hamilton graduated from Bordentown Regional High School in 1971, where he earned all-area and all-league honors playing center for the football team and also competing in track and field.

He subsequently attended Trenton State College, now known as The College of New Jersey ("TCNJ" or "New Jersey"), in the early 1970s. He played center for the Trenton State Lions football teams from 1971 to 1974. He was named an all-conference player three times and received All-ECAC honors in 1973 and 1974. He also received All-American designations in 1974 from Kodak, the Associated Press, the United Press International.

== Coaching career ==
After graduating from Trenton State in 1974, Hamilton became a graduate assistant for the Trenton State football team in 1975 and 1976. In January 1977, Hamilton was named the head football coach at TCNJ at age 23. At the time, he was the youngest head football coach at any college in the United States. Interviewed Princeton TV30 in 2008, Hamilton said that his most memorable experience was his first game as head coach at Trenton State. At age 23, he was "scared to death" to play on the road on a Friday night in a rain storm and wasn't sure what to say to the team. He put on scuba flippers, and a scuba mask, walked into the locker room and said, "All right guys, let's go out and play." The team won 14–0 in the mud and the rain, and he recalled it as "the most fun he ever had."

In 36 years as the head coach, he led the TCNJ Lions football teams to eight New Jersey Athletic Conference championships. His teams also played in NCAA tournaments in 1990, 1996, 1997, and 2007, and in ECAC tournaments in 1995 and 2003. He became the winningest football coach in Trenton State/TCNJ history in 1985 when he won his 56th game at age 32. In 1990, The New York Times praised the Trenton State team as "a typical Hamilton team noted for its discipline." He has had one 10-win season (1990), three 9-win seasons (1982, 1997, and 2007) and seven 8-win seasons (1980, 1983, 1988, 1989, 1995, 1996 and 1998).

Hamilton reached the 200 career win milestone on October 30, 2010, when TCNJ defeated Western Connecticut State 22–16.

Hamilton is also a leader of the Sunshine Football Classic, an annual football game for high school all-stars held at TCNJ's Lion Stadium to raise money for chronically ill, seriously ill, physically challenged or abused children ages 3–18. The Sunshine Football Classic has been played each year since 1997.

Hamilton retired shortly before the start of TCNJ's 2013 season. During an October 2012 home game against Kean, he and his son Matthew, an assistant at TCNJ, had been involved in a verbal altercation with Kean officers. The elder Hamilton was facing a two-game suspension imposed by the school as a result of the incident; in addition, Matthew was not rehired. In an unrelated matter, Hamilton was also facing an ethics complaint stemming from his prior tenure on a local school board.

== NCAA Football Rules Committee ==
In 2004, Hamilton began serving a four-year term on the important NCAA football rules committee. Hamilton was involved in the decision to implement, and voted in favor of, the use of instant replay in college football.

== Overall coaching record and awards ==
Hamilton compiled a record of 212 wins, 144 losses, and 6 ties. He has received numerous awards for his accomplishments and contributions to the sport of college football, including the following:

- In 1995, Hamilton was inducted into TCNJ's Alumni-Athletic Hall of Fame.
- In 2008, Hamilton was a finalist for the Liberty Mutual Coach of the Year award.
- Hamilton was selected as the New Jersey Athletic Conference Coach of the Year in 1990, 1997, 1998 and 2007.
- In 2001, Hamilton received an award from the National Football Foundation and College Football Hall of Fame for outstanding leadership.

== Personal life ==
Hamilton and his wife, Kathleen Hamilton, have five adult children. As noted earlier, one of his sons had been an assistant under him until being released after the 2012 season.

A resident of Hamilton Township, Mercer County, New Jersey, Hamilton served on the board of education of the Hamilton Township School District from 1998 to 2012.

== Head coaching record ==
| Year | Team | Overall | Conference | Standing | Bowl/playoffs |
|---|---|---|---|---|---|
Trenton State / TCNJ Lions (New Jersey State Athletic Conference / New Jersey Athletic Conference) (1977)
| 1977 | Trenton State | 4–5 | 3–2 | T–2nd | |
| 1978 | Trenton State | 6–3 | 3–2 | 3rd | |
| 1979 | Trenton State | 7–3 | 4–1 | 2nd | |
| 1980 | Trenton State | 8–1–1 | 6–0 | 1st | |
| 1981 | Trenton State | 5–4–1 | 3–2–1 | 4th | |
| 1982 | Trenton State | 9–1 | 5–1 | 2nd | |
| 1983 | Trenton State | 8–2 | 5–1 | T–1st | |
| 1984 | Trenton State | 3–7 | 2–4 | T–5th | |
| 1985 | Trenton State | 6–4 | 4–2 | 2nd | |
| 1986 | Trenton State | 4–6 | 3–3 | T–4th | |
| 1987 | Trenton State | 4–6 | 2–4 | 5th | |
| 1988 | Trenton State | 8–2 | 5–1 | 1st | |
| 1989 | Trenton State | 8–1–1 | 4–1–1 | 2nd | |
| 1990 | Trenton State | 10–2 | 5–1 | 1st | L NCAA Division III Quarterfinal |
| 1991 | Trenton State | 5–3–1 | 3–2–1 | 4th | |
| 1992 | Trenton State | 3–7 | 2–4 | 5th | |
| 1993 | Trenton State | 3–6–1 | 2–3 | T–4th | |
| 1994 | Trenton State | 5–4–1 | 3–1–1 | T–1st | |
| 1995 | Trenton State | 8–3 | 4–1 | 2nd | W ECAC Division III Southeast Championship |
| 1996 | TCNJ | 8–3 | 5–0 | 1st | L NCAA Division III Quarterfinal |
| 1997 | TCNJ | 9–3 | 4–1 | 2nd | L NCAA Division III Quarterfinal |
| 1998 | TCNJ | 8–3 | 5–0 | 1st | L NCAA Division III First Round |
| 1999 | TCNJ | 4–5 | 3–2 | 3rd | |
| 2000 | TCNJ | 4–5 | 3–3 | 4th | |
| 2001 | TCNJ | 6–4 | 4–2 | 3rd | |
| 2002 | TCNJ | 6–3 | 4–2 | T–2nd | |
| 2003 | TCNJ | 6–4 | 4–1 | 2nd | L ECAC Southeast Playoff Game |
| 2004 | TCNJ | 7–2 | 5–1 | 2nd | |
| 2005 | TCNJ | 3–7 | 1–5 | T–6th | |
| 2006 | TCNJ | 4–6 | 2–5 | T–5th | |
| 2007 | TCNJ | 9–3 | 6–1 | T–1st | L NCAA Division III Second Round |
| 2008 | TCNJ | 4–6 | 4–5 | 6th | |
| 2009 | TCNJ | 4–6 | 3–6 | T–6th | |
| 2010 | TCNJ | 5–5 | 5–4 | T–4th | |
| 2011 | TCNJ | 7–3 | 6–3 | 4th | |
| 2012 | TCNJ | 4–6 | 3–5 | 6th | |
| Trenton State / TCNJ: | | 212–144–6 | 135–82–4 | | |
| Total: | | 212–144–6 | | | |

== See also ==
- List of college football career coaching wins leaders
