= 1996 Mount Union Purple Raiders football team =

American college football season

1996 Mount Union Purple Raiders football

NCAA Division III champion OAC champion

Stagg Bowl, W 56–24 vs. Rowan
- Conference: Ohio Athletic Conference
- Record: 14–0 (9–0 OAC)
- Head coach: Larry Kehres (11th season)
- Home stadium: Mount Union Stadium

1996 Ohio Athletic Conference football standings
	Conf.			Overall
Team	W		L	W		L
Mount Union $^	9	–	0	14	–	0
John Carroll	8	–	1	9	–	1
Marietta	6	–	3	7	–	3
Ohio Northern	6	–	3	7	–	3
Baldwin–Wallace	6	–	3	6	–	4
Muskingum	4	–	5	5	–	5
Heidelberg	2	–	7	3	–	7
Hiram	2	–	7	3	–	7
Otterbein	2	–	7	2	–	8
Capital	0	–	9	1	–	9
$ – Conference champion; ^ – NCAA Division III playoff participant

The 1996 Mount Union Purple Raiders football team was an American football team that represented the University of Mount Union in the Ohio Athletic Conference (OAC) during the 1996 NCAA Division III football season. In their 11th year under head coach Larry Kehres, the Purple Raiders compiled a perfect 14–0 record, won the OAC championship, and outscored opponents by a total of 669 to 184. They qualified for the NCAA Division III playoffs and advanced to the national championship game, where they defeated Rowan, 56–24.

Junior quarterback Bill Borchert completed 250 of 374 passes (66%) for 4,035 yards and 55 touchdowns, including 505 yards and seven touchdowns in the Amos Alonzo Stagg Bowl. He was selected by the American Football Coaches Association as the first-team quarterback on its Division III All-America team and won the Melberger Award as the outstanding player in Division III.

Mount Union's 1996 season was the start of a record 54-game winning streak that spanned four seasons, continuing through December 6, 1998.

The team played its home games at Mount Union Stadium in Alliance, Ohio.

== Schedule ==
Date	Opponent	Site	Result	Attendance	Source
September 14	at Defiance*	Defiance, OH	W 62–10	2,222	
September 21	Baldwin–Wallace	Mount Union Stadium; Alliance, OH	W 55–20	3,888	
September 28	Otterbein	Mount Union Stadium; Alliance, OH	W 49–13	3,365	
October 5	at Ohio Northern	Ada, OH	W 44–7	2,650	
October 12	Heidelberg	Mount Union Stadium; Alliance, OH	W 59–7	3,110	
October 19	at John Carroll	University Heights, OH	W 27–9	4,085	
October 26	at Muskingum	New Concord, OH	W 55–17	2,300	
November 2	Marietta	Mount Union Stadium; Alliance, OH	W 61–16	3,666	
November 9	Capital	Mount Union Stadium; Alliance, OH	W 42–0	2,888	
November 16	at Hiram	Hiram, OH	W 40–0	2,183	
November 23	Allegheny*	Mount Union Stadium; Alliance, OH (NCAA Division III first round)	W 31–26		
November 30	Illinois Wesleyan*	Mount Union Stadium; Alliance, OH (NCAA Division III quarterfinal)	W 49–14		
December 7	at Wisconsin–La Crosse*	Camp Randall Stadium; Madison, WI (NCAA Division III semifinal)	W 39–21	2,131	
December 14	vs. Rowan*	Salem Football Stadium; Salem, VA (Stagg Bowl—NCAA Division III championship game)	W 56–24	5,048	
*Non-conference game
