= Dave Murray (American football) =

American football player and coach

Current position
- Title: Head coach
- Team: Hamilton
- Conference: NESCAC
- Record: 25–71

Biographical details
- Education: Ithaca

Playing career
- 1977–1980: Springfield
- Position: Linebacker

Coaching career (HC unless noted)
- 1983–1984: Ithaca (GA)
- 1985–1986: Dartmouth (LB)
- 1987–1989: Cortland (DC)
- 1990–1996: Cortland
- 1997: Lebanon Valley
- 1998–2013: Alfred
- 2014–present: Hamilton

Head coaching record
- Overall: 176–170–1
- Tournaments: 2–3 (NCAA D-III playoffs)

Accomplishments and honors

Championships
- 2 Empire 8 (2009–2010)

Dave Murray is an American college football coach and former player. He is the head football coach for Hamilton College, a position he has held since 2014. Murray served as the head football coach at State University of New York College at Cortland from 1990 to 1996, Lebanon Valley College in 1997, and Alfred University from 1998 to 2013.

Murray is a 1981 graduate of Springfield College in Springfield, Massachusetts.

== Head coaching record ==
| Year | Team | Overall | Conference | Standing | Bowl/playoffs |
|---|---|---|---|---|---|
Cortland Red Dragons (NCAA Division III independent) (1990–1996)
| 1990 | Cortland | 9–1 | | | L NCAA Division III First Round |
| 1991 | Cortland | 7–3 | | | |
| 1992 | Cortland | 7–4 | | | |
| 1993 | Cortland | 1–9 | | | |
| 1994 | Cortland | 7–4 | | | |
| 1995 | Cortland | 6–4–1 | | | |
| 1996 | Cortland | 6–4 | | | |
| Cortland: | | 43–29–1 | | | |
Lebanon Valley Flying Dutchmen (Middle Atlantic Conference) (1997)
| 1997 | Lebanon Valley | 0–10 | 0–5 | 6th (Commonwealth) | |
| Lebanon Valley: | | 0–10 | 0–5 | | |
Alfred Saxons (NCAA Division III independent) (1998–2001)
| 1998 | Alfred | 5–4 | | | |
| 1999 | Alfred | 6–4 | | | |
| 2000 | Alfred | 4–6 | | | |
| 2001 | Alfred | 4–5 | | | |
Alfred Saxons (Empire 8) (2002–2013)
| 2002 | Alfred | 4–6 | 1–3 | 4th | |
| 2003 | Alfred | 5–5 | 2–2 | 3rd | |
| 2004 | Alfred | 8–3 | 3–3 | T–4th | |
| 2005 | Alfred | 9–2 | 5–1 | 2nd | |
| 2006 | Alfred | 8–3 | 4–2 | T–3rd | |
| 2007 | Alfred | 8–3 | 4–2 | T–3rd | |
| 2008 | Alfred | 7–4 | 4–2 | T–2nd | |
| 2009 | Alfred | 8–2 | 4–1 | T–1st | L NCAA Division III First Round |
| 2010 | Alfred | 10–3 | 5–0 | 1st | L NCAA Division III Quarterfinal |
| 2011 | Alfred | 8–3 | 4–3 | T–3rd | |
| 2012 | Alfred | 6–4 | 5–2 | 2nd | |
| 2013 | Alfred | 8–3 | 5–2 | T–2nd | |
| Alfred: | | 108–60 | 46–23 | | |
Hamilton Continentals (New England Small College Athletic Conference) (2014–present)
| 2014 | Hamilton | 0–8 | 0–8 | 10th | |
| 2015 | Hamilton | 2–6 | 2–6 | T–6th | |
| 2016 | Hamilton | 3–5 | 3–5 | T–6th | |
| 2017 | Hamilton | 3–6 | 3–6 | 7th | |
| 2018 | Hamilton | 3–6 | 3–6 | T–7th | |
| 2019 | Hamilton | 4–5 | 4–5 | T–5th | |
| 2020–21 | No team—COVID-19 | | | | |
| 2021 | Hamilton | 2–7 | 2–7 | 9th | |
| 2022 | Hamilton | 2–7 | 2–7 | T–9th | |
| 2023 | Hamilton | 3–6 | 3–6 | 8th | |
| 2024 | Hamilton | 1–8 | 1–8 | 10th | |
| 2025 | Hamilton | 2–7 | 2–7 | T–8th | |
| 2026 | Hamilton | 0–0 | 0–0 | | |
| Hamilton: | | 25–71 | 25–71 | | |
| Total: | | 176–170–1 | | | |
National championship Conference title Conference division title or championship game berth
