= TCNJ Lions football =

- First season: 1921
- Head coach: Tyler Moody; 2nd season, 9–9 (.500)
- Location: Ewing Township, New Jersey
- Stadium: Lions Stadium (capacity: 6,000)
- NCAA division: Division III
- Conference: NJAC
- Colors: Blue and yellow

Conference championships
- 1980, 1983, 1988, 1990, 1994, 1996, 1998, 2007
- Mascot: Roscoe the Lion
- Website: tcnjathletics.com

The TCNJ Lions football team represents The College of New Jersey, located in Ewing Township, New Jersey, in NCAA Division III college football. The Lions, who began playing football in 1921, compete as members of the New Jersey Athletic Conference, of which they were one of the six founding members.

== Conference history ==
- 1921–1956: Independent
- 1957–present: New Jersey Athletic Conference

== Postseason appearances ==
The Lions have made four appearances in the Division III playoffs, with a combined record of 3–4.

Year	Round	Opponent	Result
1990	First Round; Second Round	Ithaca; Hofstra	W, 24–14; L, 3–38
1996	First Round; Second Round	Coast Guard; Rowan	W, 17–16; L, 3–7
1998	First Round	Rowan	L, 2–26
2007	First Round; Second Round	RPI; Mount Union	W, 17–14; L, 7–59

=== Bowl games ===
TCNJ has participated in two bowl games, and has a record of 1–1.

Season	Coach	Bowl	Opponent	Result
1995	Eric Hamilton	ECAC Bowl	Wesley	W, 10–7
2003	Eric Hamilton	ECAC Bowl	Delaware Valley Aggies	L, 54–37
