= Tuss McLaughry =

American football player and coach (1893–1974)

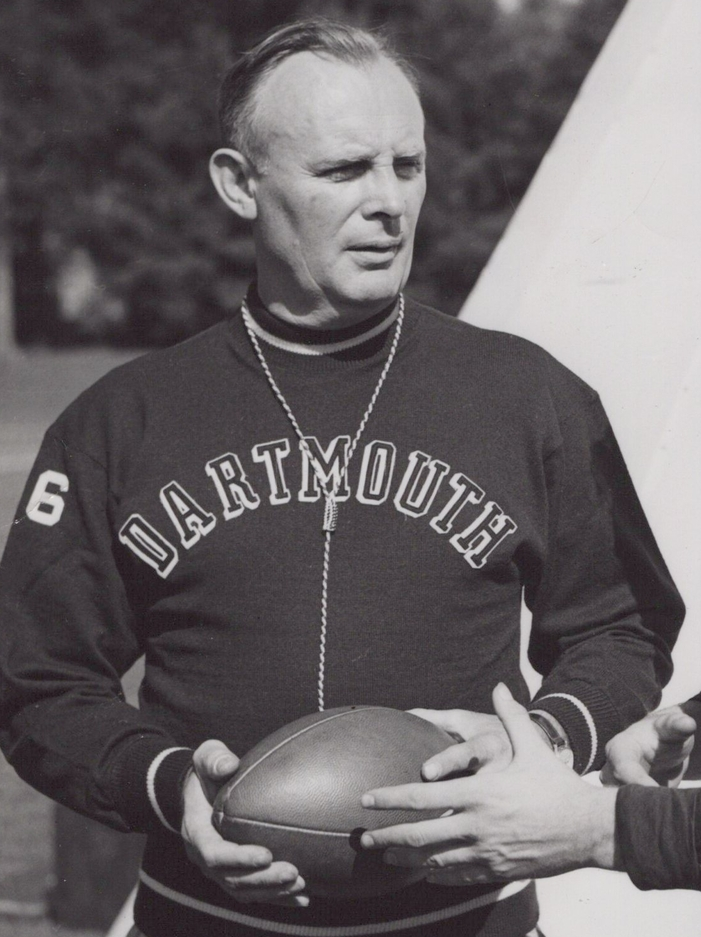
- McLaughry in 1941

Biographical details
- Born: May 19, 1893; Chicago, Illinois, U.S.
- Died: November 26, 1974 (aged 81); Norwich, Vermont, U.S.

Playing career

Football
- 1912–1914: Westminster (PA)
- ?: Massillon Tigers
- Position: Tackle

Coaching career (HC unless noted)

Football
- 1915–1916: Westminster (PA)
- 1918: Westminster (PA)
- 1921: Westminster (PA)
- 1922–1925: Amherst
- 1926–1940: Brown
- 1941–1942: Dartmouth
- 1945–1954: Dartmouth

Basketball
- 1921–1922: Westminster (PA)
- 1922–1926: Amherst
- 1926–1929: Brown

Head coaching record
- Overall: 143–149–13 (football); 17–32 (basketball)

Accomplishments and honors

Awards
- Amos Alonzo Stagg Award (1951)
- College Football Hall of Fame; Inducted in 1962 (profile)

DeOrmond "Tuss" McLaughry (May 19, 1893 – November 26, 1974) was an American football player and coach. He served as the head football coach at Westminster College in New Wilmington, Pennsylvania (1915–1916, 1918, 1921), Amherst College (1922–1925), Brown University (1926–1940), and Dartmouth College (1941–1942, 1945–1954), compiling a career college football record of 143–149–13. McLaughry was also the head basketball coach at Brown from 1926 to 1929, tallying a mark of 17–32. He was inducted into the College Football Hall of Fame as coach in 1962. Of all coaches inducted into the College Football Hall of Fame, McLaughry is the only one with a winning percentage under .500.

== Early life ==
Born on May 19, 1893, in Chicago, McLaughry was the son of James Alexander McLaughry Sr. (1860–1942) and his wife, Mary Graham McLaughry (1874–1952). He had at least seven siblings. He grew up in Sharon, Pennsylvania and attended Michigan State University for a year before transferring to Westminster College in New Wilmington, Pennsylvania.

== Coaching career ==
McLaughry's coaching career at Dartmouth College was interrupted after two years due to World War II, where McLaughry served as a lieutenant colonel in the United States Marine Corps.

Twenty years after graduating from high school, McLaughry attended night and summer classes to earn his law degree from Northeastern University in Boston, Massachusetts. While and after coaching at Dartmouth, McLaughry was also the chairman of the Physical Education Department there until 1960.

McLaughry was instrumental in developing the American Football Coaches Association (AFCA) during his lifetime, even serving a one-year term as President in 1936, and then remaining active with the organization as a volunteer secretary-treasurer from 1940 to 1960. It was after 1960 that McLaughry earned compensation for this position, and retired from the organization in 1965.

== Personal life ==
On August 21, 1911 in Detroit, McLaughry married Florence Marguerite Jackson (July 20, 1892 – June 1, 1985), daughter of John Llouington Jackson (1849-1924) and Ella Adele (nee Lovett) Jackson (1856-1911). Together, they had three children:

- Jeanne Marguerite McLaughry (1912-2007)
- John Jackson McLaughry (1917-2007), who followed in his father's footsteps and played and coached football; he was the head football coach at Union College from 1947 to 1949, Amherst College from 1950 to 1958, and Brown University from 1959 to 1966. He also served with the Marines in World War II as a Major.
- Robert DeOrmond McLaughry (1921-2016)

McLaughry died on November 26, 1974, at his home in Norwich, Vermont.

== Head coaching record ==
=== Football ===
| Year | Team | Overall | Conference | Standing | Bowl/playoffs |
|---|---|---|---|---|---|
Westminster Titans (Independent) (1915–1916)
| 1915 | Westminster | 2–5 | | | |
| 1916 | Westminster | 2–5–1 | | | |
Westminster Titans (Independent) (1918)
| 1918 | Westminster | 3–2 | | | |
Westminster Titans (Independent) (1921)
| 1921 | Westminster | 1–6–2 | | | |
| Westminster: | | 8–18–3 | | | |
Amherst Lord Jeffs (Little Three Conference) (1922–1925)
| 1922 | Amherst | 2–6 | 0–2 | 3rd | |
| 1923 | Amherst | 3–3–2 | 1–1 | 2nd | |
| 1924 | Amherst | 3–5 | 1–1 | 2nd | |
| 1925 | Amherst | 7–1 | 2–0 | 1st | |
| Amherst: | | 15–15–2 | 4–4 | | |
Brown Bears (Independent) (1926–1940)
| 1926 | Brown | 9–0–1 | | | |
| 1927 | Brown | 3–6–1 | | | |
| 1928 | Brown | 8–1 | | | |
| 1929 | Brown | 5–5 | | | |
| 1930 | Brown | 6–3–1 | | | |
| 1931 | Brown | 7–3 | | | |
| 1932 | Brown | 7–1 | | | |
| 1933 | Brown | 3–5 | | | |
| 1934 | Brown | 3–6 | | | |
| 1935 | Brown | 1–8 | | | |
| 1936 | Brown | 3–7 | | | |
| 1937 | Brown | 5–4 | | | |
| 1938 | Brown | 5–3 | | | |
| 1939 | Brown | 5–3–1 | | | |
| 1940 | Brown | 6–3–1 | | | |
| Brown: | | 76–58–5 | | | |
Dartmouth Indians (Independent) (1941–1942)
| 1941 | Dartmouth | 5–4 | | | |
| 1942 | Dartmouth | 5–4 | | | |
Dartmouth Indians (Independent) (1945–1954)
| 1945 | Dartmouth | 1–6–1 | | | |
| 1946 | Dartmouth | 3–6 | | | |
| 1947 | Dartmouth | 4–4–1 | | | |
| 1948 | Dartmouth | 6–2 | | | |
| 1949 | Dartmouth | 6–2 | | | |
| 1950 | Dartmouth | 3–5–1 | | | |
| 1951 | Dartmouth | 4–5 | | | |
| 1952 | Dartmouth | 2–7 | | | |
| 1953 | Dartmouth | 2–7 | | | |
| 1954 | Dartmouth | 3–6 | | | |
| Dartmouth: | | 44–58–3 | | | |
| Total: | | 143–149–13 | | | |
National championship Conference title Conference division title or championship game berth

== See also ==
- List of college football head coaches with non-consecutive tenure
