= Frank Girardi =

American football player and coach (born 1939)

Biographical details
- Born: July 17, 1939 (age 87); Williamsport, Pennsylvania, U.S.

Playing career
- c. 1960: West Chester
- Position: Running back

Coaching career (HC unless noted)
- 1961–1962: Jersey Shore HS (PA) (assistant)
- 1963–1968: Jersey Shore HS (PA)
- 1969–1971: Lycoming (assistant)
- 1972–2007: Lycoming

Head coaching record
- Overall: 257–97–5 (college)
- Tournaments: 13–11 (NCAA D-III playoffs)

Accomplishments and honors

Championships
- 6 Middle Atlantic (1985, 1989–1992, 2003; 3 Middle Atlantic Northern Division (1978–1979, 1982); 6 Middle Atlantic Freedom League (1995–2000)
- College Football Hall of Fame; Inducted in 2016 (profile)

Frank Girardi (born July 16, 1939) is an American former football player and coach. He was the head football coach at Lycoming College from 1972 to 2007, compiling a record of 257–97–5. At the time of his retirement in 2007, he was the fifth winningest NCAA football coach.

== Early years ==
Girardi attended Williamsport High School in Williamsport, Pennsylvania, where he played at the running back position on the school's football team. He subsequently attended West Chester University, where he also played running back for the football team.

After earning a degree in education, Girardi began his coaching career in 1961 as an assistant coach at Jersey Shore High School. He was the school's head football coach from 1963 to 1968.

== Lycoming ==
In 1969, Girardi joined the staff at Lycoming College in Williamsport, Pennsylvania, as an assistant football coach. He became Lycoming's head football coach in 1972 and remained in that position for 36 years. From 1972 to 2007, Girardi compiled a record of 257–97–5. His teams won 13 Middle Atlantic Conference championships and earned 11 NCAA Division III playoff bids and trips to championship games in 1990 and 1997.

In his first season as Lycoming's head coach, Girardi's house caught fire on the morning before his first game. Though his family was forced from the house in their pajamas, Girardi reported to the stadium for the game. A profile of Girardi in Lycoming Magazine noted: "With firemen on the roof battling the blaze, Girardi, an eager first-year head coach, turned to his wife, Lynne, and said 'Take care of things, honey!' and left to lead his Warrior team against Albright." Girardi later recalled that his team lost that first game 39-0: "That was the start of my college coaching career. Our house burned down and we were beaten 39-0. I think the 39-0 hurt me more."

When Girardi's team appeared in the 1990 NCAA Division III football tournament, his players wore borrowed shoes. Lycoming played all of its games on grass fields and advanced to the semi-final game against Hofstra, which has artificial turf. Lacking shoes to play on artificial turf, Girardi borrowed turf shoes from Joe Paterno's Penn State Nittany Lions football team. When Lycoming advanced to the national championship game, The New York Times reported, "Wearing shoes borrowed from Penn State and playing defense like Penn State, the undefeated Warriors of Lycoming College upset previously undefeated Hofstra ..."

Over the course of his 36 years as Lycoming's head football coach, Girardi coached his two sons and two grandsons as players on the football team. Girardi later recalled, "The College has always been great to me. I grew up in Williamsport. This is home and I love the area. Anytime other opportunities came up, whenever I compared them, Lycoming always won. It didn't take me long to realize that this was the place I wanted to be until I retire.... It's been a real family situation, and that's the way I tried to run the football program, just like a family. I treated all the players like family and they responded."

In his last four seasons as head coach at Lycoming, Girardi's teams had losing records three times, including a 3–7 record in 2007. Girardi announced his retirement in December 2007, saying, "I asked two questions. First, can you continue to lead this program at the highest levels, and of course I can. But can you do it at the level you've set for yourself? I set the bar too high to feel like if I can't do it at anytime I'm not being true to myself, the team and Lycoming College." Lycoming president Dr. James E. Douthat praised Girardi's contributions to the college, "Coach G, as most of his players call him, is a legendary figure. He has etched a nationally respected, winning tradition in the town where he was raised. In the world of NCAA Division III football, the name Frank Girardi is synonymous with class and success, both on and off the field."

At the time of his retirement, Girardi ranked fifth in wins among active NCAA football coaches and second among active NCAA Division III coaches. In 2016, he was inducted into the College Football Hall of Fame, the first coach or player from Lycoming College to receive this honor.

== Head coaching record ==
=== College ===
| Year | Team | Overall | Conference | Standing | Bowl/playoffs |
|---|---|---|---|---|---|
Lycoming Warriors (Middle Atlantic Conference) (1972–2007)
| 1972 | Lycoming | 2–6 | 2–5 | 7th (Northern) | |
| 1973 | Lycoming | 2–6 | 2–5 | 5th (Northern) | |
| 1974 | Lycoming | 3–6 | 1–5 | 6th (Northern) | |
| 1975 | Lycoming | 6–2 | 3–2 | 3rd (Northern) | |
| 1976 | Lycoming | 8–1 | 5–1 | 2nd (Northern) | |
| 1977 | Lycoming | 6–3 | 4–2 | 3rd (Northern) | |
| 1978 | Lycoming | 7–2 | 5–1 | T–1st (Northern) | |
| 1979 | Lycoming | 8–1–1 | 6–0–1 | 1st (Northern) | |
| 1980 | Lycoming | 9–1 | 6–1 | 2nd (Northern) | |
| 1981 | Lycoming | 5–4–1 | 4–2–1 | T–3rd (Northern) | |
| 1982 | Lycoming | 8–2 | 6–1 | T–1st (Northern) | |
| 1983 | Lycoming | 7–2–1 | 6–1–1 | 2nd | |
| 1984 | Lycoming | 8–2 | 6–2 | T–2nd | |
| 1985 | Lycoming | 10–1 | 9–0 | 1st | L NCAA Division III First Round |
| 1986 | Lycoming | 8–2 | 7–2 | T–2nd | |
| 1987 | Lycoming | 6–2–1 | 6–2–1 | 3rd | |
| 1988 | Lycoming | 7–3 | 5–3 | T–4th | |
| 1989 | Lycoming | 10–2 | 7–1 | T–1st | L NCAA Division III Quarterfinal |
| 1990 | Lycoming | 12–1 | 8–0 | 1st | L NCAA Division III Championship |
| 1991 | Lycoming | 10–1 | 8–0 | 1st | L NCAA Division III Quarterfinal |
| 1992 | Lycoming | 8–1–1 | 7–0–1 | 1st | L NCAA Division III First Round |
| 1993 | Lycoming | 6–4 | 3–2 | 3rd (Freedom) | |
| 1994 | Lycoming | 5–4 | 2–2 | T–2nd (Freedom) | |
| 1995 | Lycoming | 8–3 | 3–1 | T–1st (Freedom) | L NCAA Division III Quarterfinal |
| 1996 | Lycoming | 11–1 | 4–0 | 1st (Freedom) | L NCAA Division III Semifinal |
| 1997 | Lycoming | 12–1 | 4–0 | 1st (Freedom) | L NCAA Division III Championship |
| 1998 | Lycoming | 10–1 | 4–0 | 1st (Freedom) | L NCAA Division III Quarterfinal |
| 1999 | Lycoming | 9–1 | 4–0 | 1st (Freedom) | L NCAA Division III First Round |
| 2000 | Lycoming | 7–2 | 4–0 | 1st (Freedom) | |
| 2001 | Lycoming | 8–1 | 8–1 | 2nd | |
| 2002 | Lycoming | 6–3 | 6–3 | 4th | |
| 2003 | Lycoming | 9–2 | 8–1 | 1st | W NCAA Division III Quarterfinal |
| 2004 | Lycoming | 3–7 | 3–6 | T–7th | |
| 2005 | Lycoming | 6–4 | 5–4 | T–4th | |
| 2006 | Lycoming | 4–5 | 4–5 | T–6th | |
| 2007 | Lycoming | 3–7 | 3–4 | T–5th | |
| Lycoming: | | 257–97–5 | 178–65–5 | | |
| Total: | | 257–97–4 | | | |
National championship Conference title Conference division title or championship game berth

== See also ==
- List of college football career coaching wins leaders
