= Fred Martinelli =

American football player and coach (1929–2021)

Biographical details
- Born: February 15, 1929; Columbus, Ohio, U.S.
- Died: May 15, 2021 (aged 92); Ashland, Ohio, U.S.

Playing career
- 1948–1950: Otterbein

Coaching career (HC unless noted)
- 1951–1955: Belleville HS (OH)
- 1956–1958: Bryan HS (OH)
- 1959–1993: Ashland

Head coaching record
- Overall: 217–119–12 (college)
- Tournaments: 0–1 (NCAA D-II playoffs)

Accomplishments and honors

Championships
- 5 Mid-Ohio (1960, 1962–1965); 5 HCC (1980, 1982, 1984–1986)

Awards
- 5× Mid-Ohio Coach of the Year (1960, 1962–1965); 5× HCC Coach of the Year (1980, 1982, 1984–1986); MIFC Coach of the Year (1993)
- College Football Hall of Fame; Inducted in 2002 (profile)

Fred Martinelli (February 15, 1929 – May 15, 2021) was an American football player and coach. He served as head football coach at Ashland University in Ashland, Ohio from 1959 to 1993, compiling a record of 217–119–12. Martinelli was inducted into the College Football Hall of Fame as a coach in 2002.

Following his graduation from Otterbein College in 1951, Martinelli became the head football coach at Bellville High School in Bellville, Ohio. At Bellville, he led his football teams to 28–16 record in five seasons and also coached basketball and baseball. He resigned from Bellville in 1956 to become the head football coach at Bryan High School in Bryan, Ohio.

== Head coaching record ==
=== College ===
Year	Team	Overall	Conference	Standing	Bowl/playoffs
Ashland Eagles (Mid-Ohio League / Mid-Ohio Conference) (1959–1965)
1959	Ashland	4–3–2	3–1–1	T–2nd	
1960	Ashland	6–3	4–1	T–1st	
1961	Ashland	3–6	2–3	T–3rd	
1962	Ashland	4–4–1	2–1	T–1st	
1963	Ashland	9–1	3–0	1st	
1964	Ashland	6–3	3–0	1st	
1965	Ashland	7–1–1	3–0	1st	
1966	Ashland	5–3–2	1–0	2nd	
Ashland Eagles (NCAA College Division / Division III independent) (1967–1977)
1967	Ashland	8–0–1			
1968	Ashland	8–2			
1969	Ashland	5–3–1			
1970	Ashland	4–6			
1971	Ashland	6–4			
1972	Ashland	11–0			
1973	Ashland	7–3			
1974	Ashland	5–5			
1975	Ashland	4–6			
1976	Ashland	6–4			
1977	Ashland	6–4			
Ashland Eagles (Heartland Collegiate Conference) (1978–1989)
1978	Ashland	2–8	1–0	NA	
1979	Ashland	3–6	0–1	NA	
1980	Ashland	6–3–1	5–2	T–1st	
1981	Ashland	6–4	5–2	T–3rd	
1982	Ashland	8–3	6–1	1st	
1983	Ashland	5–5	2–4	T–4th	
1984	Ashland	6–3–1	5–0–1	1st	
1985	Ashland	6–4	5–1	T–1st	
1986	Ashland	9–2	6–0	1st	L NCAA Division II First Round
1987	Ashland	7–2–1	3–1–1	2nd	
1988	Ashland	6–4	2–2	3rd	
1989	Ashland	6–4	2–2	T–2nd	
Ashland Eagles (Midwest Intercollegiate Football Conference) (1990–1993)
1990	Ashland	7–3–1	7–3	T–2nd	
1991	Ashland	9–2	8–2	T–2nd	
1992	Ashland	8–3	7–3	5th	
1993	Ashland	9–2	8–2	2nd	
Ashland:		217–119–12	93–32–3		
Total:		217–119–12			

== See also ==
- List of college football career coaching wins leaders
