= Danny Hale (American football) =

American football coach (born 1946)

Biographical details
- Born: December 29, 1946 (age 79)

Playing career
- 1967: West Chester

Coaching career (HC unless noted)
- 1974: Vermont (DB/LB)
- 1975–1980: Bucknell (OL)
- 1981–1983: Colgate (DC/OL)
- 1984–1988: West Chester
- 1993–2012: Bloomsburg

Head coaching record
- Overall: 213–69–1
- Tournaments: 7–9 (NCAA D-II playoffs)

Accomplishments and honors

Championships
- 13 PSAC East Division (1986–1987, 1994–1997, 2000–2003, 2005–2006, 2010)

Awards
- AFCA Division II Coach of the Year (2000); 10× PSAC Coach of the Year (1986–1987, 1994–1997, 2000–2001, 2005–2006)
- College Football Hall of Fame; Inducted in 2024 (profile)

Danny Hale (born December 29, 1946) is an American former college football coach. He served as head football coach at West Chester University from 1984 to 1989 and at Bloomsburg University of Pennsylvania from 1993 to 2012, compiling a career head coaching record of 213–69–1. Hale was inducted into the College Football Hall of Fame in 2024.

== Head coaching record ==
Year	Team	Overall	Conference	Standing	Bowl/playoffs
West Chester Golden Rams (Pennsylvania State Athletic Conference) (1984–1988)
1984	West Chester	7–3	5–1	2nd (East)	
1985	West Chester	7–3	5–1	2nd (East)	
1986	West Chester	8–3	6–0	1st (East)	
1987	West Chester	9–2	6–0	1st (East)	
1988	West Chester	9–2	5–1	2nd (East)	L NCAA Division II First Round
West Chester:		40–13	27–3		
Bloomsburg Huskies (Pennsylvania State Athletic Conference) (1993–present)
1993	Bloomsburg	5–6	4–2	T–2nd (East)	
1994	Bloomsburg	8–3	5–1	T–1st (East)	
1995	Bloomsburg	9–1–1	5–0–1	T–1st (East)	
1996	Bloomsburg	10–2	6–0	1st (East)	L NCAA Division II First Round
1997	Bloomsburg	8–2	6–0	1st (East)	
1998	Bloomsburg	5–6	4–2	3rd (East)	
1999	Bloomsburg	7–4	4–2	3rd (East)	
2000	Bloomsburg	12–3	6–0	1st (East)	L NCAA Division II Championship
2001	Bloomsburg	9–2	6–0	1st (East)	L NCAA Division II Quarterfinal
2002	Bloomsburg	8–2	5–1	T–1st (East)	
2003	Bloomsburg	7–4	5–1	T–1st (East)	
2004	Bloomsburg	7–3	4–2	3rd (East)	
2005	Bloomsburg	11–1	6–0	1st (East)	L NCAA Division II Second Round
2006	Bloomsburg	12–2	6–0	1st (East)	L NCAA Division II Semifinal
2007	Bloomsburg	7–3	4–1	2nd (East)	
2008	Bloomsburg	11–2	6–1	2nd (East)	L NCAA Division II Quarterfinal
2009	Bloomsburg	8–3	5–2	T–2nd (East)	
2010	Bloomsburg	10–3	7–0	1st (East)	L NCAA Division II Second Round
2011	Bloomsburg	9–2	5–2	3rd (East)	
2012	Bloomsburg	10–2	6–1	2nd (East)	L NCAA Division II First Round
Bloomsburg:		173–56–1	107–18–1		
Total:		213–69–1			
National championship Conference title Conference division title or championship game berth

== See also ==
- List of college football career coaching wins leaders
