= Gene Carpenter =

American football player and coach (1939–2009)

Biographical details
- Born: November 28, 1939; Cornwall, Pennsylvania, U.S.
- Died: December 10, 2009 (aged 70); Lancaster, Pennsylvania, U.S.

Playing career
- c. 1960: Huron

Coaching career (HC unless noted)
- 1965–1967: Adams State (assistant)
- 1968: Adams State (interim HC)
- 1969: Utah (assistant)
- 1970–2001: Millersville

Head coaching record
- Overall: 220–90–6
- Tournaments: 2–3 (NCAA D-II playoffs); 0–1 (NCAA D-III playoffs)

Accomplishments and honors

Championships
- 1 RMAC (1968); 8 PSAC Eastern Division (1977, 1979–1981, 1988, 1990, 1993, 1995, 1998)

Awards
- 2× PSAC Eastern Division Coach of the Year (1977, 1981)
- College Football Hall of Fame; Inducted in 2012 (profile)

Gene A. Carpenter (November 28, 1939 – December 10, 2009) was an American college football coach. He served as the head football coach at Adams State College—now known as Adams State University in 1968 and at Millersville University of Pennsylvania from 1970 to 2001, compiling a career college football coaching record of 220–90–6. Carpenter was inducted in the College Football Hall of Fame in 2012.

== Coaching career ==
Carpenter was the tenth head football coach at Adams State College in Alamosa, Colorado and he held that position for the 1968 season. His coaching record at Adams State was 8–1. In the one season as head coach, his team outscored opponents by 225 to 115. The only loss was a 28–6 defeat by New Mexico Highlands on October 5, 1968 on their way to becoming the Rocky Mountain Athletic Conference champions.

Carpenter was an assistant football coach the University of Utah for one season, in 1969, before being hired as head football coach at Millersville State College—now known as Millersville University of Pennsylvania—in January 1970.

== Head coaching record ==
Year	Team	Overall	Conference	Standing	Bowl/playoffs
Adams State Indians (Rocky Mountain Athletic Conference) (1968)
1968	Adams State	8–1			
Adams State:		8–1			
Millersville Marauders (Pennsylvania State Athletic Conference) (1970–2000)
1970	Millersville	4–5	3–3	T–4th (East)	
1971	Millersville	6–3	4–2	T–2nd (East)	
1972	Millersville	5–3–1	4–2	T–2nd (East)	
1973	Millersville	7–2	4–2	3rd (East)	
1974	Millersville	8–1	5–1	2nd (East)	
1975	Millersville	6–3	4–2	3rd (East)	
1976	Millersville	6–3	4–2	3rd (East)	
1977	Millersville	8–2	5–0	1st (East)	
1978	Millersville	6–3	2–3	4th (East)	
1979	Millersville	8–2	4–1	T–1st (East)	L NCAA Division III Quarterfinal
1980	Millersville	6–2–1	4–1	T–1st (East)	
1981	Millersville	8–3	5–0	1st (East)	
1982	Millersville	5–4–1	4–2	3rd (East)	
1983	Millersville	4–6	3–3	4th (East)	
1984	Millersville	6–3–1	4–1–1	3rd (East)	
1985	Millersville	8–2	4–2	3rd (East)	
1986	Millersville	9–1	5–1	2nd (East)	
1987	Millersville	7–3	4–2	T–2nd (East)	
1988	Millersville	10–2	6–0	1st (East)	L NCAA Division II Quarterfinal
1989	Millersville	6–4	4–2	T–2nd (East)	
1990	Millersville	7–3	5–0	1st (East)	
1991	Millersville	4–5–1	2–3–1	5th (East)	
1992	Millersville	7–3	4–2	3rd (East)	
1993	Millersville	8–2	6–0	1st (East)	
1994	Millersville	8–2	4–2	T–3rd (East)	
1995	Millersville	9–1–1	5–0–1	T–1st (East)	L NCAA Division II First Round
1996	Millersville	6–4	4–2	T–2nd (East)	
1997	Millersville	7–3	4–2	2nd (East)	
1998	Millersville	8–2	6–0	1st (East)	
1999	Millersville	9–3	5–1	2nd (East)	L NCAA Division II First Round
2000	Millersville	6–4	5–1	2nd (East)	
Millersville:		212–89–6	132–45–3		
Total:		220–90–6			
National championship Conference title Conference division title or championship game berth

== See also ==
- List of college football career coaching wins leaders
