= Wittenberg Tigers football =

American college football team

- First season: 1892; 134 years ago
- Athletic director: Brian Agler
- Head coach: BJ Coad; 1st season, 0–0 (–)
- Location: Springfield, Ohio
- Stadium: Edwards–Maurer Field (capacity: 3,000)
- NCAA division: Division III
- Conference: NCAC
- Colors: Red and white
- All-time record: 799–375–32 (.676)
- Bowl record: 1–0 (1.000)

NCAA Division II championships
- 1973, 1975

Small college national championships
- 1962, 1964, 1969

Conference championships
- 34 (17 OAC, 17 NCAC)
- Consensus All-Americans: 127
- Fight song: Wittenberg Fight Song
- Mascot: Ezry The Tiger
- Website: Wittenbergtigers.com

The Wittenberg Tigers football team represents Wittenberg University in college football. The first recorded year in Wittenberg football history was 1892. The Tigers compete at the NCAA Division III level and the program is affiliated with the North Coast Athletic Conference (NCAC). The Tigers play their home games at Edwards–Maurer Field in Springfield, Ohio.

== Overview ==
With an overall record is 799 wins, 375 losses and 32 ties, Wittenberg has the second-most wins in NCAA Division III football history. Since 1955, Wittenberg has had only one losing record and has won five national championships (1962, 1964, 1969, 1973, and 1975), 18 Ohio Athletic Conference championships (1918, 1940, 1957, 1958, 1961, 1962, 1963, 1964, 1966, 1969, 1973, 1974, 1976, 1978, 1979, 1981, and 1988) and 16 NCAC championships (1992, 1995, 1997, 1998, 1999, 2000, 2001, 2006, 2009, 2010, 2012, 2013, 2014, 2016, 2017, and 2018). In 2011, the Tigers became the first D-III or D-II program to reach 700 wins with a victory over Capital in their season opener.

== History ==
=== Godfrey era ===
Wittenberg's success in college football began under head coach Ernie Godfrey, who led the team in 1916 and from 1919 to 1928. Godfrey played college football for Ohio State from 1912 to 1914. Godfrey compiled a record of 63–24–8 at Wittenberg and were undefeated in both 1919 and 1920. Godfrey later joined the Ohio State coaching staff where he remained from 1929 to 1961. Godfrey was inducted into the College Football Hall of Fame in 1975.

=== Edwards era ===
Wittenberg football began a period of unprecedented success in 1955 with the hiring of Bill Edwards as head coach. Edwards had been an All-American while playing for Wittenberg in 1929. After coaching the Detroit Lions (1941–1942) and other college teams, Edwards returned to Wittenberg as head football coach from 1955 to 1968. In 14 years at Wittenberg, Edwards compiled a record of 98–20–4 and two national championships. Sports Illustrated referred to Edwards as "a combination of Santa Claus and Genghis Khan." In 1986, Edwards became the second Wittenberg football coach to be inducted into the College Football Hall of Fame.

The brightest star of the Edwards era at Wittenberg was quarterback Charlie Green. With Green leading the team, Wittenberg compiled a 25–0–1 record and won two national championships from 1962 to 1964. Green totaled 5,575 passing yards and 61 passing touchdowns at Wittenberg and later played for the Oakland Raiders. In 2002, Green joined Ernie Godfrey and Bill Edwards in the College Football Hall of Fame.

=== Maurer era ===
After Edwards retired, Dave Maurer took over as head coach in 1969. Maurer had been an assistant coach under Edwards since 1955. Between 1969 and 1983, Maurer compiled a record of 129–23–3 for a winning percentage of .842. His teams won 11 division and league championships, two Division III national championships (1973 and 1975) and were runners-up in 1978 and 1979. In 1991, Maurer became the third Wittenberg football coach to be inducted into the College Football Hall of Fame.

=== Fincham era ===
Current head coach Joe Fincham took over in 1996. He has compiled a record of 224–51, and his teams have won eight NCAC championships and appeared eight times in the NCAA Division III football championship. At the end of the 2012 season, Fincham's winning percentage ranked in the top five among active NCAA football coaches. In 2011, the Tigers became the first non-Division I NCAA program to compile 700 all-time wins, and just the 19th NCAA program at any level to reach the mark.

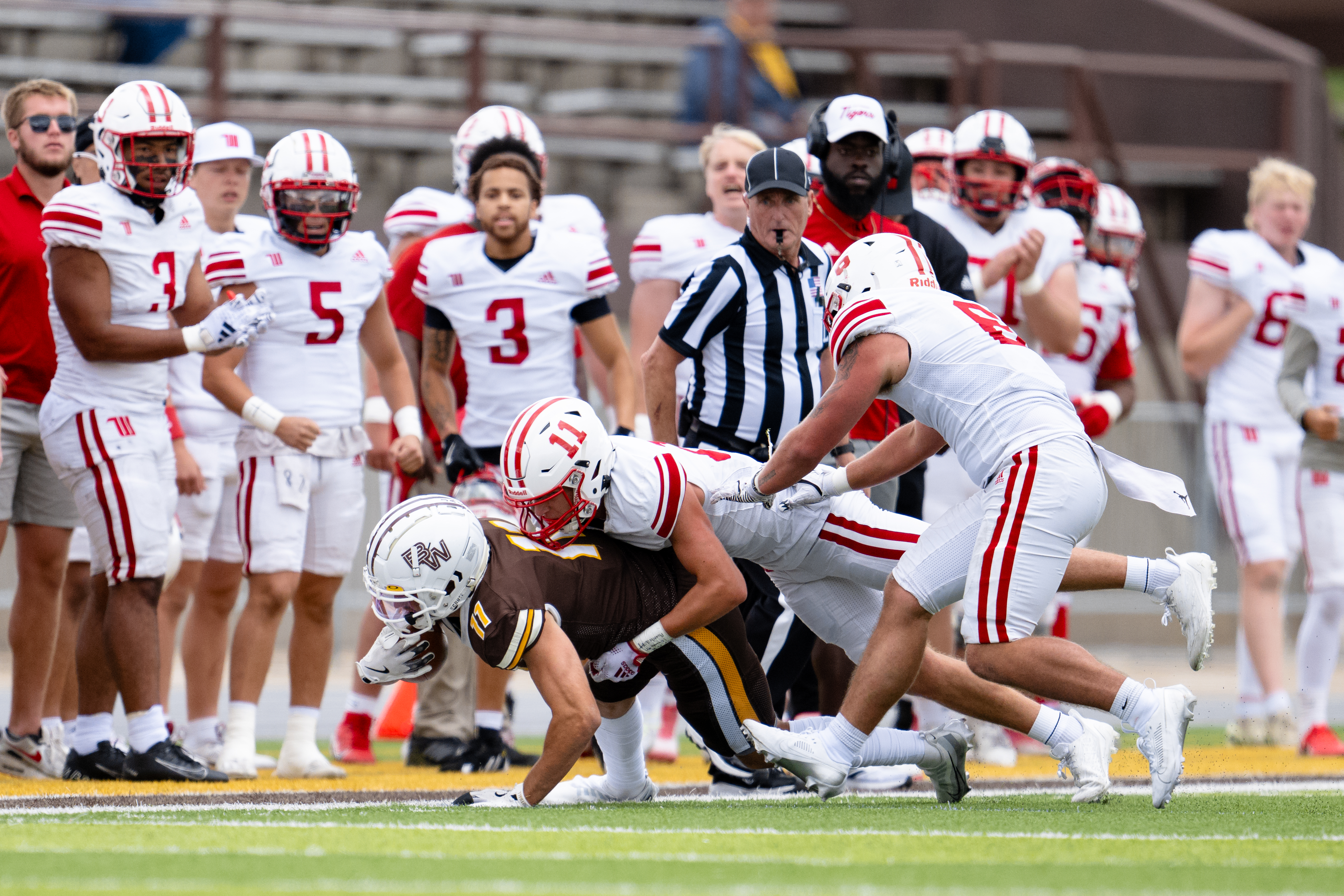
A game between Wittenberg and Baldwin Wallace in 2024

== Championships ==
=== National championships ===
Year	Association	Division	Head coach	Record	Opponent	Result
1973	NCAA (2)	Division III (2)	Dave Maurer	12–0 (5–0 OAC)	Juniata	W, 41–0
1975	NCAA (2)	Division III (2)	Dave Maurer	12–1 (4–0 OAC)	Ithaca	W, 28–0

== Head coaching records ==
- Ernie Godfrey (1916, 1919–1928): 95–63–24 (.705)
- Watt Hobt (1917–1918): 9–2 (.818)
- Bill Stobbs (1929–1941): 54–54–5 (.500)
- Carl Schroeder (1942): 1–5–1 (.214)
- Richard Ainslie (1945): 3–4 (.429)
- Howard Maurer (1946–1948): 8–17 (.320)
- Harold Shields (1949): 2–7 (.222)
- Ralph E. Ness (1950–1954): 20–25–1 (.446)
- Bill Edwards (1955–1968): 98–20–4 (.820)
- Dave Maurer (1969–1983): 129–23–3 (.842)
- Ron Murphy (1984–1988): 34–17 (.667)
- Doug Neibuhr (1989–1995): 50–18–1 (.732)
- Joe Fincham (1996–2021): 224–51 (.815)
- Jim Collins (2022–present): 20–17 (.541)

== Notable former players ==
- John Brickels, former NFL coach
- Jim Collins, college coach
- Charlie Green, former NFL player
- Mark Henninger, former college coach
- Taver Johnson, college coach
- Ron Lancaster, former CFL All-Star quarterback and coach
- Bill Lange, former college coach
- Jeff Mullen, college coach
- Gary Tranquill, former college coach
- Bob Wagner, former college coach
- Jim Worden, former CFL All-Star tight end

== See also ==
- List of NCAA football teams by wins
- List of NCAA Division III football programs
