= 1996 NCAA Division III football season =

American college football season

- Regular season: August – November 1996
- Playoffs: November – December 1996
- National championship: Salem Football Stadium; Salem, VA
- Champion: Mount Union (2)
- Gagliardi Trophy: Lon Erickson (QB), Illinois Wesleyan

The 1996 NCAA Division III football season, part of the college football season organized by the NCAA at the Division III level in the United States, began in August 1996, and concluded with the NCAA Division III Football Championship, also known as the Stagg Bowl, in December 1996 at Salem Football Stadium in Salem, Virginia. The Mount Union Purple Raiders won their second Division III championship by defeating the Rowan Profs, 56−24. The Gagliardi Trophy, given to the most outstanding player in Division III football, was awarded to Lon Erickson, quarterback from Illinois Wesleyan.

== Conference and program changes ==
=== Conference changes ===
- The American Southwest Conference began its first season of play in 1996.
- The Northwest Conference transitioned its entire membership from the NAIA to Division III prior to the season.
- The Texas Intercollegiate Athletic Association dissolved after the 1996 season when most of members joined the American Southwest.

School	1995 Conference	1996 Conference
Austin College	TIAA	American Southwest
Hardin–Simmons	TIAA	American Southwest
Howard Payne	TIAA	American Southwest
McMurry	TIAA	American Southwest
Mississippi College	Independent	American Southwest
Sul Ross	TIAA	American Southwest
Thomas More	AMC	Independent

=== Program changes ===
- After Trenton State College changed its name to The College of New Jersey in 1996, the Trenton State Lions became the College of New Jersey (TCNJ) Lions at the start of the 1996 season.

== Conference standings ==
1996 Centennial Conference football standings
	Conf.			Overall
Team	W		L	W		L
Ursinus $^	7	–	0	9	–	2
Franklin & Marshall	6	–	1	9	–	2
Johns Hopkins	5	–	2	7	–	3
Dickinson	3	–	4	5	–	5
Western Maryland	3	–	4	4	–	6
Gettysburg	3	–	4	3	–	7
Muhlenberg	1	–	6	1	–	9
Swarthmore	0	–	7	0	–	10
$ – Conference champion; ^ – NCAA Division III playoff participant

1996 College Conference of Illinois and Wisconsin football standings
	Conf.			Overall
Team	W		L	W		L
Illinois Wesleyan $^	7	–	0	10	–	1
Wheaton (IL)	6	–	1	8	–	1
Augustana (IL)	4	–	3	5	–	4
North Central (IL)	4	–	3	5	–	4
Millikin	3	–	4	3	–	6
Carthage	3	–	4	3	–	6
Elmhurst	1	–	6	2	–	7
North Park	0	–	7	0	–	9
$ – Conference champion; ^ – NCAA Division III playoff participant

1996 Eastern Collegiate Football Conference standings
	Conf.			Overall
Team	W		L	W		L
Salve Regina $	8	–	0	9	–	0
Bentley	7	–	1	7	–	3
Stonehill	7	–	2	8	–	2
Sacred Heart	4	–	3	4	–	6
Merrimack	5	–	4	5	–	4
UMass Lowell	4	–	4	6	–	4
MIT	3	–	5	4	–	5
Nichols	2	–	5	2	–	8
Western New England	2	–	6	2	–	7
Curry	1	–	7	3	–	7
Assumption	1	–	8	1	–	9
$ – Conference champion

1996 Freedom Football Conference standings
	Conf.			Overall
Team	W		L	W		L
Coast Guard +^	5	–	1	8	–	3
Springfield (MA) +	5	–	1	6	–	4
Merchant Marine	4	–	2	6	–	3
Western Connecticut	3	–	3	6	–	4
Plymouth State	3	–	3	5	–	4
Norwich	1	–	5	2	–	8
WPI	0	–	6	2	–	8
+ – Conference co-champions; ^ – NCAA Division III playoff participant

1996 Illini–Badger Football Conference standings
	Conf.			Overall
Team	W		L	W		L
Lakeland $	5	–	0	8	–	2
Concordia (WI)	4	–	1	5	–	4
MacMurray	3	–	2	7	–	3
Eureka	2	–	3	5	–	4
Greenville	1	–	4	2	–	7
Concordia (IL)	0	–	5	1	–	8
$ – Conference champion

1997 Indiana Collegiate Athletic Conference football standings
	Conf.			Overall
Team	W		L	W		L
DePauw $	6	–	0	9	–	1
Wabash	4	–	2	7	–	3
Anderson (IN)	3	–	3	7	–	3
Hanover	3	–	3	6	–	4
Rose–Hulman	3	–	3	3	–	7
Manchester	2	–	4	4	–	6
Franklin (IN)	0	–	6	3	–	7
$ – Conference champion; ^ – NCAA Division III playoff participant

1996 Iowa Conference football standings
	Conf.			Overall
Team	W		L	W		L
Simpson (IA) $^	8	–	0	10	–	1
Central (IA)	7	–	1	7	–	3
Loras	5	–	3	7	–	3
Wartburg	5	–	3	7	–	3
Buena Vista	4	–	4	5	–	5
Upper Iowa	3	–	5	3	–	7
Luther	2	–	6	3	–	7
William Penn *	2	–	6	1	–	9
Dubuque	0	–	8	1	–	9
$ – Conference champion; ^ – NCAA Division III playoff participant; * – William Penn was awarded a conference forfeit win over Buena Vista, but the NCAA did not award an overall win.

1996 Michigan Intercollegiate Athletic Association football standings
	Conf.			Overall
Team	W		L	W		L
Albion $^	5	–	0	9	–	1
Hope	3	–	2	4	–	5
Alma	2	–	3	4	–	5
Kalamazoo	2	–	3	3	–	6
Olivet	2	–	3	2	–	7
Adrian	1	–	4	3	–	6
$ – Conference champion; ^ – NCAA Division III playoff participant

1996 Middle Atlantic Conference football standings
	Conf.			Overall
Team	W		L	W		L
Commonwealth
Albright x^	5	–	0	10	–	2
Widener	4	–	1	7	–	3
Susquehanna	3	–	2	5	–	5
Moravian	2	–	3	6	–	4
Juniata	1	–	4	5	–	5
Lebanon Valley	0	–	5	1	–	9
Freedom
Lycoming x^	4	–	0	11	–	1
Wilkes	3	–	1	8	–	3
Fairleigh Dickinson–Florham	1	–	3	2	–	8
King's (PA)	1	–	3	2	–	8
Delaware Valley	1	–	3	1	–	8
x – Division champion/co-champions; ^ – NCAA Division III playoff participant

1996 Midwest Conference football standings
	Conf.			Overall
Team	W		L	W		L
North Division
Ripon xy$	5	–	0	9	–	1
St. Norbert	4	–	1	5	–	4
Carroll (WI)	3	–	2	6	–	3
Lake Forest	2	–	3	2	–	7
Lawrence	1	–	4	2	–	7
Beloit	0	–	5	0	–	9
South Division
Cornell (IA) xy	4	–	1	8	–	2
Coe	4	–	1	6	–	3
Knox	3	–	2	6	–	3
Grinnell	2	–	3	4	–	5
Illinois College	1	–	4	3	–	6
Monmouth (IL)	0	–	5	2	–	7
Championship: Ripon 26, Cornell (IA) 8
$ – Conference champion; x – Division champion/co-champions; y – Championship game participant

1996 Minnesota Intercollegiate Athletic Conference football standings
	Conf.					Overall
Team	W		L		T	W		L		T
Saint John's (MN) $^	9	–	0	–	0	11	–	1	–	0
Bethel (MN)	8	–	1	–	0	9	–	1	–	0
St. Thomas (MN)	7	–	2	–	0	8	–	2	–	0
Concordia–Moorhead	6	–	3	–	0	6	–	4	–	0
Carleton	4	–	5	–	0	5	–	5	–	0
Hamline	4	–	5	–	0	5	–	5	–	0
Augsburg	2	–	7	–	0	3	–	7	–	0
Macalester	2	–	7	–	0	3	–	7	–	0
Gustavus Adolphus	2	–	7	–	0	2	–	8	–	0
St. Olaf	1	–	8	–	0	2	–	8	–	0
$ – Conference champion; ^ – NCAA Division III playoff participant

1996 New England Football Conference standings
	Conf.			Overall
Team	W		L	W		L
Worcester State $	8	–	0	10	–	1
UMass Dartmouth	7	–	1	8	–	2
Massachusetts Maritime	5	–	3	6	–	4
Maine Maritime	5	–	3	5	–	5
Bridgewater State	4	–	4	5	–	5
Westfield State	4	–	4	4	–	6
UMass–Boston	2	–	6	2	–	7
Framingham State	1	–	7	1	–	8
Fitchburg State	0	–	8	0	–	9
$ – Conference champion

1996 New England Small College Athletic Conference football standings
	Conf.			Overall
Team	W		L	W		L
Amherst	7	–	1	7	–	1
Trinity (CT)	7	–	1	7	–	1
Williams	6	–	2	6	–	2
Hamilton	5	–	3	5	–	3
Middlebury	5	–	3	5	–	3
Bowdoin	3	–	5	3	–	5
Colby	3	–	5	3	–	5
Wesleyan	3	–	5	3	–	5
Tufts	1	–	7	1	–	7
Bates	0	–	8	0	–	8
No conference champion recognized

1996 New Jersey Athletic Conference football standings
	Conf.			Overall
Team	W		L	W		L
TCNJ $^	5	–	0	8	–	3
Rowan ^	4	–	1	10	–	3
Jersey City State	3	–	2	5	–	5
Montclair State	2	–	3	4	–	6
Kean	1	–	4	2	–	7
William Paterson	0	–	5	1	–	9
$ – Conference champion; ^ – NCAA Division III playoff participant

1996 North Coast Athletic Conference football standings
	Conf.			Overall
Team	W		L	W		L
Allegheny $^	8	–	0	10	–	1
Wittenberg	7	–	1	9	–	1
Wooster	6	–	2	7	–	3
Denison	3	–	4	4	–	6
Ohio Wesleyan	3	–	4	4	–	6
Kenyon	3	–	5	4	–	6
Case Western Reserve	2	–	4	5	–	5
Earlham	2	–	6	3	–	7
Oberlin	0	–	8	0	–	10
$ – Conference champion; ^ – NCAA Division III playoff participant

1996 Northwest Conference football standings
	Conf.			Overall
Team	W		L	W		L
No. 7 Willamette $^	5	–	0	9	–	2
No. 15 Pacific Lutheran ^	4	–	1	7	–	3
Linfield	3	–	2	5	–	4
Lewis & Clark	2	–	3	4	–	6
Whitworth	1	–	4	1	–	8
Puget Sound	0	–	5	0	–	9
$ – Conference champion; ^ – NAIA Division II playoff participant; Rankings from NAIA Division II poll

1996 Ohio Athletic Conference football standings
	Conf.			Overall
Team	W		L	W		L
Mount Union $^	9	–	0	14	–	0
John Carroll	8	–	1	9	–	1
Marietta	6	–	3	7	–	3
Ohio Northern	6	–	3	7	–	3
Baldwin–Wallace	6	–	3	6	–	4
Muskingum	4	–	5	5	–	5
Heidelberg	2	–	7	3	–	7
Hiram	2	–	7	3	–	7
Otterbein	2	–	7	2	–	8
Capital	0	–	9	1	–	9
$ – Conference champion; ^ – NCAA Division III playoff participant

1996 Old Dominion Athletic Conference football standings
	Conf.			Overall
Team	W		L	W		L
Emory & Henry $	4	–	1	8	–	2
Randolph–Macon	3	–	2	7	–	3
Bridgewater	3	–	2	5	–	5
Washington and Lee	2	–	3	5	–	5
Guilford	2	–	3	3	–	6
Hampden–Sydney	1	–	4	3	–	7
$ – Conference champion

1996 Presidents' Athletic Conference football standings
	Conf.					Overall
Team	W		L		T	W		L		T
Washington & Jefferson $^	5	–	0	–	0	8	–	2	–	0
Alfred	4	–	1	–	0	4	–	6	–	0
Bethany (WV)	3	–	2	–	0	4	–	6	–	0
Waynesburg	2	–	3	–	0	2	–	7	–	0
Grove City	1	–	4	–	0	2	–	8	–	0
Thiel	0	–	5	–	0	1	–	9	–	0
$ – Conference champion; ^ – NCAA Division III playoff participant

1996 Southern California Intercollegiate Athletic Conference football standings
	Conf.			Overall
Team	W		L	W		L
Redlands $	5	–	0	6	–	3
La Verne	4	–	1	7	–	2
Cal Lutheran	2	–	3	3	–	6
Claremont-Mudd	2	–	3	2	–	7
Occidental	1	–	4	1	–	8
Whittier	1	–	4	1	–	8
$ – Conference champion

1996 Southern Collegiate Athletic Conference football standings
	Conf.			Overall
Team	W		L	W		L
Trinity (TX) +	3	–	1	9	–	1
Millsaps +	3	–	1	8	–	2
Sewanee	2	–	2	4	–	4
Centre	1	–	3	5	–	5
Rhodes	1	–	3	3	–	7
+ – Conference co-champions

1996 St. Louis Intercollegiate Athletic Conference football standings
	Conf.			Overall
Team	W		L	W		L
MacMurray +	3	–	1	7	–	3
Westminster (MO) +	3	–	1	5	–	4
Blackburn +	3	–	1	3	–	6
Greenville	1	–	3	2	–	7
Principia	0	–	4	0	–	8
+ – Conference co-champions

1996 Upstate Collegiate Athletic Association football standings
	Conf.			Overall
Team	W		L	W		L
Union (NY) $	4	–	0	9	–	1
Hobart	3	–	1	5	–	5
RPI	2	–	2	5	–	4
St. Lawrence	1	–	3	2	–	7
Rochester (NY)	0	–	4	0	–	9
$ – Conference champion

1996 Wisconsin Intercollegiate Athletic Conference football standings
	Conf.			Overall
Team	W		L	W		L
Wisconsin–La Crosse $^	7	–	0	11	–	2
Wisconsin–River Falls ^	6	–	1	9	–	2
Wisconsin–Whitewater	5	–	2	8	–	2
Wisconsin–Stevens Point	4	–	3	6	–	3
Wisconsin–Eau Claire	3	–	4	5	–	5
Wisconsin–Oshkosh	2	–	5	4	–	6
Wisconsin–Stout	1	–	6	4	–	6
Wisconsin–Platteville	0	–	7	1	–	9
$ – Conference champion; ^ – NCAA Division III playoff participant

1996 NCAA Division III independents football records
	Conf.			Overall
Team	W		L	W		L
Frostburg State		–		9	–	2
Buffalo State ^		–		8	–	2
Catholic University		–		7	–	2
Chapman		–		7	–	2
Wesley		–		7	–	2
Pomona-Pitzer		–		6	–	2
Ithaca		–		6	–	3
Brockport		–		6	–	4
Cortland		–		6	–	4
Hartwick		–		6	–	4
Methodist		–		6	–	4
Stony Brook		–		6	–	4
Thomas More		–		6	–	4
Aurora		–		5	–	4
Menlo		–		5	–	4
Wilmington (OH)		–		5	–	5
Salisbury State		–		4	–	5
Colorado College		–		3	–	6
Defiance		–		3	–	6
Maryville (TN)		–		3	–	6
Chowan		–		3	–	7
Bluffton		–		2	–	8
Ferrum		–		1	–	8
^ – NCAA Division III playoff participant

== Conference champions ==
Conference champions
- American Southwest Conference – Hardin–Simmons and Sul Ross
- Centennial Conference – Ursinus
- College Conference of Illinois and Wisconsin – Illinois Wesleyan
- Freedom Football Conference – Coast Guard and Springfield (MA)
- Illini-Badger Football Conference – Lakeland
- Indiana Collegiate Athletic Conference – DePauw
- Iowa Intercollegiate Athletic Conference – Simpson
- Michigan Intercollegiate Athletic Association – Albion
- Middle Atlantic Conference – Lycoming
- Midwest Conference – Ripon
- Minnesota Intercollegiate Athletic Conference – Saint John's (MN)
- New England Football Conference – Worcester State
- New Jersey Athletic Conference – TCNJ
- North Coast Athletic Conference – Allegheny
- Northwest Conference – Willamette
- Ohio Athletic Conference – Mount Union
- Old Dominion Athletic Conference – Emory & Henry
- Presidents' Athletic Conference – Washington & Jefferson
- Southern California Intercollegiate Athletic Conference – Redlands
- Southern Collegiate Athletic Conference – Millsaps and Trinity (TX)
- University Athletic Association – Carnegie Mellon, Case Western, and Washington–Saint Louis
- Upper Midwest Athletic Conference – Maranatha Baptist and Martin Luther
- Upstate Collegiate Athletic Conference – Union (NY)
- Wisconsin Intercollegiate Athletic Conference – Wisconsin–La Crosse

== Postseason ==
The 1996 NCAA Division III Football Championship playoffs were the 24th annual single-elimination tournament to determine the national champion of men's NCAA Division III college football. The championship Stagg Bowl game was held at Salem Football Stadium in Salem, Virginia for the second time. As of 2014, Salem has remained the yearly host of the Stagg Bowl. Like the previous eleven tournaments, this year's bracket featured sixteen teams.

=== Playoff bracket ===
Regionals; Campus Sites
Mount Union	31
Allegheny	26
Illinois Wesleyan	23
Albion	20
Wisconsin–La Crosse	44
Wisconsin–River Falls	0
Saint John's (MN)	21
Simpson	18
Lycoming	31
Ursinus	24
Albright	31
Washington & Jefferson	17
Rowan	21
Buffalo State	20
TCNJ	17
Coast Guard	16

Quarterfinals; Campus Sites
Mount Union	49
Illinois Wesleyan	14
Wisconsin–La Crosse	37
Saint John's (MN)	30
Lycoming	31
Albright	13
Rowan	7
TCNJ	3

Semifinals; Campus Sites
Mount Union	39
Wisconsin–La Crosse	21
Lycoming	14
Rowan	33

National Championship Game; Salem Football Stadium; Salem, Virginia
Mount Union	56
Rowan	24

== See also ==
- 1996 NCAA Division I-A football season
- 1996 NCAA Division I-AA football season
- 1996 NCAA Division II football season
- 1996 NAIA Division I football season
- 1996 NAIA Division II football season
