= 1963 Saint John's Johnnies football team =

American college football season

1963 Saint John's Johnnies football

NAIA national champion MIAC champion

Camellia Bowl, W 33–27 vs. Prairie View A&M
- Conference: Minnesota Intercollegiate Athletic Conference
- Record: 10–0 (7–0 MIAC)
- Head coach: John Gagliardi (11th season)
- Home stadium: Saint John's Stadium

1963 Minnesota Intercollegiate Athletic Conference football standings
	Conf.					Overall
Team	W		L		T	W		L		T
No. 2 Saint John's (MN) $^	7	–	0	–	0	10	–	0	–	0
Concordia (MN)	6	–	1	–	0	7	–	2	–	0
Augsburg	4	–	3	–	0	4	–	3	–	1
Hamline	3	–	4	–	0	4	–	4	–	1
Gustavus Adolphus	3	–	4	–	0	4	–	5	–	0
St. Thomas (MN)	3	–	4	–	0	4	–	5	–	0
Minnesota–Duluth	2	–	5	–	0	3	–	6	–	0
Macalester	0	–	7	–	0	1	–	8	–	0
$ – Conference champion; ^ – NAIA playoff participant; Rankings from NAIA poll

The 1963 Saint John's Johnnies football team was an American football team that compiled a perfect 10–0 record and won the NAIA Football National Championship with a victory over Prairie View A&M in the Camellia Bowl. It was the first of four national championships for the Saint John's Johnnies football program under head coach John Gagliardi.

== Schedule ==
Date	Opponent	Site	Result	Attendance	Source
September 14	St. Cloud State*	Saint John's Stadium; Collegeville, MN	W 40–0		
September 21	Hamline	Saint John's Stadium; Collegeville, MN	W 38–14		
September 28	at Minnesota–Duluth	Duluth, MN	W 60–6		
October 5	Gustavus Adolphus^{†}	Saint John's Stadium; Collegeville, MN	W 34–7		
October 12	at Augsburg	Parade Stadium; Minneapolis, MN	W 26–6	> 7,000	
October 19	Concordia (MN)	Saint John's Stadium; Collegeville, MN	W 28–0		
October 26	at Macalester	St. Paul, MN	W 40–6	3,500	
November 2	at St. Thomas (MN)	O'Shaughnessy Stadium; St Paul, MN	W 32–6		
November 30	vs. College of Emporia	Metropolitan Stadium; Bloomington, MN (NAIA semifinal)	W 54–0	12,348	
December 14	vs. Prairie View A&M	Charles C. Hughes Stadium; Sacramento, CA (NAIA Championship Game—Camellia Bowl)	W 33–27	12,220	
*Non-conference game; ^{†}Homecoming

== Season overview ==
The team represented Saint John's University as a member of the Minnesota Intercollegiate Athletic Conference (MIAC) during the 1963 NAIA football season. In their 11th season under head coach John Gagliardi, the Johnnies compiled a 10–0 record (7–0 against conference opponents), won the MIAC championship, and outscored opponents by 335 to 72.

The 1962 Saint John's team had also been unbeaten and untied but did not receive one of the four berths in the National Association of Intercollegiate Athletics NAIA playoffs. Having strung together consecutive perfect seasons, the 1963 team was invited to the playoffs.

On defense, the team set a national record by giving up an average of 12.9 rushing yards per game.

=== Semifinal against Emporia ===
In their first playoff game, the Johnnies faced undefeated College of Emporia, which featured the NAIA's most potent offense, with an average of 517.3 yards per game. Saint John's smothered Emporia's offense and won, 54–0. Saint John's scored its 54 points in the first three quarters, intercepted four Emporia passes, recovered two fumbles, and blocked a punt.

=== Camellia Bowl ===
On December 7, 1963, the Johnnies faced Prairie View A&M in the Camellia Bowl, the NAIA national championship game played in Sacramento, California. Prairie View, which featured future NFL stars Ken Houston and Otis Taylor came into the game as the undefeated black college national champion. Three months after the March on Washington and two weeks after the assassination of John F. Kennedy, the Camellia Bowl matched the all-black Prairie View Panthers against the all-white Saint John's Johnnies. The Johnnies trailed at halftime, but moved ahead with two third-quarter touchdowns and won, 33–27. The victory extended Saint John's winning streak to 19 games and brought an NAIA Football National Championship to Saint John's.

== Awards and honors ==
United Press International (UPI) named Gagliardi the MIAC Coach of the Year. He was also named small college coach of the year by the Rockne Club of America. The 1963 team won the first of four national championships earned by Gagliardi's teams at Saint John's. The next three were in 1965, 1976, and 2003. Gagliardi became the winningest coach in college football history and was inducted into the College Football Hall of Fame.

Halfback Bernie Beckman was named MIAC Player of the Year, as voted by the MIAC coaches for the UPI.

Saint John's dominated the 1963 All-MIAC football team selected by the conference coaches, filling 12 of 22 spots: Beckman (named to the offensive and defensive teams); Craig Muyres (named as quarterback on offensive team and safety on defensive team); halfback Bob Spinner; fullback Rich Froehle; end Ken Roering (named to the offensive and defensive teams); tackle John McDowell (named to the offensive and defensive teams); offensive guard Dave Honer; and defensive end Hardy Reyerson.

The 1963 team was inducted into Saint John's J-Club Hall of Honor in 2019.
