= John Gagliardi =

American football coach (1926–2018)

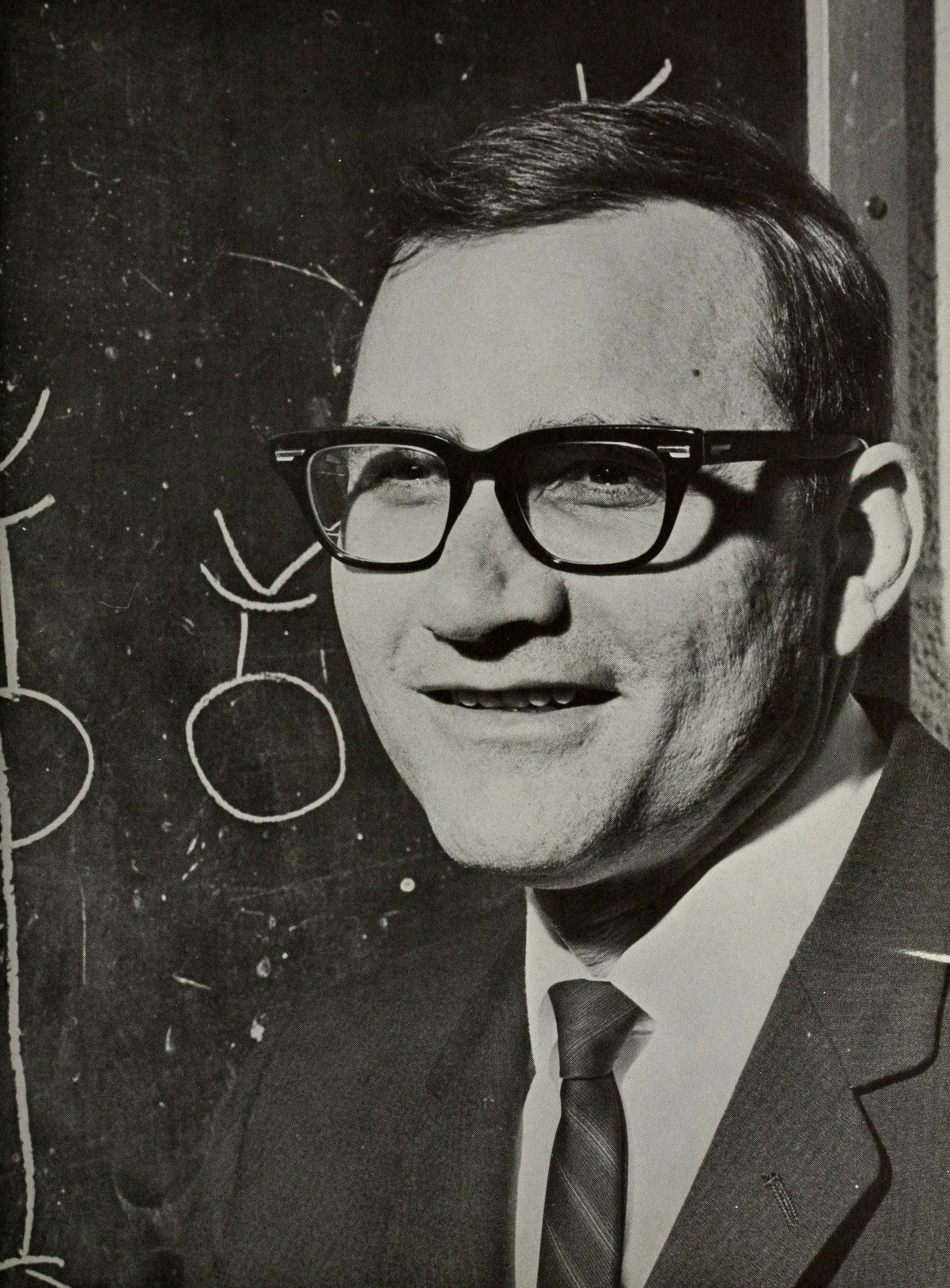
- Gagliardi, c. 1966

Biographical details
- Born: November 1, 1926; Trinidad, Colorado, U.S.
- Died: October 7, 2018 (aged 91); Collegeville, Minnesota, U.S.
- Education: Colorado College

Coaching career (HC unless noted)

Football
- 1943–1944: Trinidad Catholic HS (CO)
- 1945–1948: St. Mary's HS (CO)
- 1949–1952: Carroll (MT)
- 1953–2012: Saint John's (MN)

Ice hockey
- 1954–1959: Saint John's (MN)

Basketball
- 1949–1953: Carroll (MT)

Head coaching record
- Overall: 489–138–11 (college football); 42–25–1 (college ice hockey)
- Bowls: 1–0
- Tournaments: 4–1 (NAIA playoffs); 34–18 (NCAA D-III playoffs)

Accomplishments and honors

Championships
- 2 NAIA (1963, 1965); 2 NCAA Division III (1976, 2003); 3 MCC (1950–1952); 27 MIAC (1953, 1962, 1963, 1965, 1971, 1974–1977, 1979, 1982, 1985, 1989, 1991, 1993–1996, 1998, 1999, 2001–2003, 2005, 2006, 2008, 2009)

Awards
- NAIA Coach of the Year (1965); AFCA NCAA Division III COY (2003); Amos Alonzo Stagg Award (2009); 9× MIAC Coach of the Year (1982, 1985, 1994, 1998–1999, 2001, 2003, 2005, 2009)

Records
- Most wins in college football history (489)
- College Football Hall of Fame; Inducted in 2006 (profile)

John Gagliardi (/ɡəˈlɑːrdi/ gə-LAR-dee; November 1, 1926 – October 7, 2018) was an American football coach. He was the head football coach at Saint John's University in Collegeville, Minnesota, from 1953 until 2012. From 1949 to 1952, he was the head football coach at Carroll College in Helena, Montana. With a career record of 489–138–11, Gagliardi has the most wins of any coach in college football history. His Saint John's Johnnies teams won four national titles: the NAIA Football National Championship in 1963 and 1965, and the NCAA Division III Football Championship in 1976 and 2003. Gagliardi was inducted into the College Football Hall of Fame in 2006.

== Early life ==
John Gagliardi was born to Italian Americans Ventura and Antonietta Gagliardi in Trinidad, Colorado, in 1926. He began coaching football at Trinidad Catholic High School in 1943, at the age of 16, when his high school coach was called into service during World War II. He was a player-coach his senior year of high school and continued to coach high school football at St. Mary's High School while obtaining his college degree at Colorado College in Colorado Springs.

== College coaching career ==
At the age of 22, with six years of high school coaching, Gagliardi was hired at Carroll College in Helena, Montana. In four seasons as head coach at Carroll, Gagliardi compiled a 24–6–1 record, winning three Montana Collegiate Conference championships. After the 1952 season, Gagliardi left Carroll for Saint John's University in Collegeville, Minnesota.

Pro Football Hall of Fame player Johnny Blood coached football at St. John's from 1950 to 1952. On leaving the job he said "Nobody can win at St. John's."

In 60 seasons coaching the Saint John's Johnnies, Gagliardi won a school and conference record 27 Minnesota Intercollegiate Athletic Conference (MIAC) titles and four national championships: in 1963 (at the Camellia Bowl), 1965, 1976, and 2003. His record at Saint John's was 465–132–10, bringing his career college football mark to 489–138–11.

On November 8, 2003, Gagliardi broke the record for career coaching wins with his 409th victory, passing Grambling State's Eddie Robinson. The 13,107 fans who witnessed the victory over Bethel at Saint John's Clemens Stadium were the largest crowd in NCAA Division III history. The win also gave Saint John's its 23rd MIAC championship and an automatic berth in the NCAA Division III playoffs. The Johnnies went on to win the national championship with a 24–6 victory over Mount Union.

In 1993, Jostens and the J Club of St. John's University began awarding the Gagliardi Trophy annually to the most outstanding player in NCAA Division III. On August 11, 2006, Gagliardi and Florida State's Bobby Bowden became the first active head coaches to be enshrined in the College Football Hall of Fame. (Nevada's Chris Ault had been inducted in 2002 and returned to coaching two years later.)

Gagliardi was known for his unique coaching approach, which he called "Winning with No's." He instructed his players not to call him "coach", did not use a whistle or blocking sleds, prohibited tackling in practices, did not require his players to lift weights, and limited his team practices to 90 minutes.

Gagliardi announced his retirement from coaching on November 19, 2012. Gagliardi died on October 7, 2018, at the age of 91.

== Awards ==
In 2003, Gagliardi received the Amos Alonzo Stagg Coaching Award from the United States Sports Academy. He won the 2007 Liberty Mutual Division III Coach of the Year. In 2009, Gagliardi won the Amos Alonzo Stagg Award from the American Football Coaches Association. Gagliardi received the National College Football Awards Association's (NCFAA) Contributions to College Football Award in 2013. He was inducted into the National Association of Collegiate Directors of Athletics Hall of Fame in 2006, the Colorado Sports Hall of Fame in 2015, and Saint John's University's J-Club Hall of Honor in 2018.

== Head coaching record ==
=== College football ===
Year	Team	Overall	Conference	Standing	Bowl/playoffs	Coaches^{#}	AP^{°}
Carroll Fighting Saints (Montana Collegiate Conference) (1949–1952)
1949	Carroll	5–1					
1950	Carroll	5–2	4–0	1st			
1951	Carroll	6–1–1	4–0	1st			
1952	Carroll	8–2	4–0	1st			
Carroll:		24–6–1					
Saint John's Johnnies (Minnesota Intercollegiate Athletic Conference) (1953–2012)
1953	Saint John's	6–2	5–1	T–1st			
1954	Saint John's	6–2	4–2	T–3rd			
1955	Saint John's	7–2	4–2	T–2nd			
1956	Saint John's	3–4–1	2–4–1	T–6th			
1957	Saint John's	5–3	4–3	4th			
1958	Saint John's	6–2	5–2	3rd			
1959	Saint John's	5–3	4–3	4th			
1960	Saint John's	4–3–1	3–3–1	T–5th			
1961	Saint John's	6–2	5–2	2nd			
1962	Saint John's	9–0	7–0	1st			
1963	Saint John's	10–0	7–0	1st	W NAIA Championship (Camellia)		
1964	Saint John's	4–3	4–3	T–3rd			
1965	Saint John's	11–0	7–0	1st	W NAIA Championship		
1966	Saint John's	4–3–1	3–3–1	5th			
1967	Saint John's	3–5	3–4	5th			
1968	Saint John's	6–4	4–3	T–3rd			
1969	Saint John's	8–1–1	5–1–1	2nd	W Mineral Water		
1970	Saint John's	6–3	5–2	T–2nd			
1971	Saint John's	8–1	6–1	T–1st			
1972	Saint John's	7–2	5–2	2nd			
1973	Saint John's	4–4	3–4	T–5th			
1974	Saint John's	7–2	5–2	T–1st			
1975	Saint John's	8–1–1	6–0–1	1st			
1976	Saint John's	10–0–1	7–0	1st	W NCAA Division III Championship		
1977	Saint John's	7–2	7–0	1st	L NCAA Division III Quarterfinal		
1978	Saint John's	6–3	5–3	4th			
1979	Saint John's	7–2	6–2	T–1st			
1980	Saint John's	5–3	5–3	T–3rd			
1981	Saint John's	7–2	6–2	T–2nd			
1982	Saint John's	9–1	8–0	1st	L NAIA Division II Quarterfinal		
1983	Saint John's	7–4	7–2	2nd			
1984	Saint John's	6–3	6–3	4th			
1985	Saint John's	8–2	8–1	1st	L NCAA Division III First Round		
1986	Saint John's	4–4–1	4–4–1	5th			
1987	Saint John's	8–3	7–2	T–2nd	L NCAA Division III Quarterfinal		
1988	Saint John's	7–2	7–2	3rd			
1989	Saint John's	10–1–1	8–0–1	1st	L NCAA Division III Semifinal		
1990	Saint John's	7–3	6–3	T–3rd			
1991	Saint John's	11–1	8–0	1st	L NCAA Division III Semifinal		
1992	Saint John's	8–1–1	7–1–1	2nd			
1993	Saint John's	12–1	9–0	1st	L NCAA Division III Semifinal		
1994	Saint John's	11–2	8–1	1st	L NCAA Division III Semifinal		
1995	Saint John's	8–1–1	7–1–1	T–1st			
1996	Saint John's	11–1	9–0	1st	L NCAA Division III Quarterfinal		
1997	Saint John's	6–4	6–3	4th			
1998	Saint John's	11–1	9–0	1st	L NCAA Division III Quarterfinal		
1999	Saint John's	11–2	8–1	1st	L NCAA Division III Quarterfinal		
2000	Saint John's	13–2	8–1	2nd	L NCAA Division III Championship		
2001	Saint John's	11–3	8–1	T–1st	L NCAA Division III Semifinal		
2002	Saint John's	12–2	8–0	1st	L NCAA Division III Semifinal		
2003	Saint John's	14–0	8–0	1st	W NCAA Division III Championship		
2004	Saint John's	7–3	6–2	T–2nd			
2005	Saint John's	11–1	8–0	1st	L NCAA Division III Second Round		
2006	Saint John's	11–2	7–1	T–1st	L NCAA Division III Quarterfinal		
2007	Saint John's	10–2	7–1	2nd	L NCAA Division III Second Round		
2008	Saint John's	8–3	6–2	1st	L NCAA Division III First Round		
2009	Saint John's	10–1	8–0	1st	L NCAA Division III First Round		
2010	Saint John's	7–3	6–2	3rd			
2011	Saint John's	6–4	5–3	4th			
2012	Saint John's	5–5	3–5	6th			
Saint John's:		465–132–10	362–99–9				
Total:		489–138–11					
National championship Conference title Conference division title or championship game berth

== See also ==
- List of college football career coaching wins leaders
- List of college football seasons coached leaders
