= 2003 NCAA Division III football season =

American college football season

- Regular season: August – November 2003
- Playoffs: November – December 2003
- National championship: Salem Football Stadium; Salem, VA
- Champion: Saint John's (MN) (2)
- Gagliardi Trophy: Blake Elliott (WR, P, KR), Saint John's (MN)

The 2003 NCAA Division III football season, part of the college football season organized by the NCAA at the Division III level in the United States, began in August 2003, and concluded with the NCAA Division III Football Championship, also known as the Stagg Bowl, in December 2003 at Salem Football Stadium in Salem, Virginia. The Saint John's (MN) Johnnies won their second Division III championship by defeating the three-time defending national champion Mount Union Purple Raiders, 24−6.

The Gagliardi Trophy, given to the most outstanding player in Division III football, was awarded to Blake Elliott, wide receiver, punter, and kick returner from Saint John's (MN).

== Conference changes and new programs ==
| School | 2002 conference | 2003 conference |
|---|---|---|
| Husson Braves | No program | Independent |
| New Jersey City Gothic Knights | NJAC | Dropped program |
| Upper Iowa Peacocks | Iowa | Northern Sun (Division II) |

== Conference standings ==
2003 American Southwest Conference football standings
| | Conf. | | | Overall |
| Team | W | | L | W | | L |
|---|---|---|---|---|---|---|
| No. 15 Mary Hardin–Baylor + | 8 | – | 1 | 9 | – | 1 |
| Hardin–Simmons + | 8 | – | 1 | 8 | – | 2 |
| No. 14 East Texas Baptist +^ | 8 | – | 1 | 9 | – | 3 |
| Howard Payne | 6 | – | 3 | 6 | – | 4 |
| McMurry | 4 | – | 5 | 4 | – | 6 |
| Louisiana College | 4 | – | 5 | 4 | – | 6 |
| Austin | 3 | – | 6 | 3 | – | 7 |
| Mississippi College | 2 | – | 7 | 3 | – | 7 |
| Texas Lutheran | 2 | – | 7 | 2 | – | 8 |
| Sul Ross | 0 | – | 9 | 0 | – | 10 |
+ – Conference co-champions; ^ – NCAA Division III playoff participant; Rankings from D3football.com

2003 Atlantic Central Football Conference standings
| | Conf. | | | Overall |
| Team | W | | L | W | | L |
|---|---|---|---|---|---|---|
| Frostburg State $ | 3 | – | 0 | 4 | – | 5 |
| Salisbury | 2 | – | 1 | 7 | – | 2 |
| Wesley | 1 | – | 2 | 6 | – | 4 |
| Apprentice § | 0 | – | 3 | 1 | – | 8 |
$ – Conference champion; § – Not an NCAA member

2003 Centennial Conference football standings
| | Conf. | | | Overall |
| Team | W | | L | W | | L |
|---|---|---|---|---|---|---|
| No. 25 Johns Hopkins + | 5 | – | 1 | 10 | – | 1 |
| Muhlenberg + | 5 | – | 1 | 7 | – | 3 |
| McDaniel | 4 | – | 2 | 5 | – | 5 |
| Franklin & Marshall | 3 | – | 3 | 4 | – | 6 |
| Gettysburg | 2 | – | 4 | 5 | – | 5 |
| Dickinson | 2 | – | 4 | 4 | – | 6 |
| Ursinus | 0 | – | 6 | 3 | – | 7 |
+ – Conference co-champions; ^ – NCAA Division III playoff participant; Rankings from D3football.com

2003 College Conference of Illinois and Wisconsin football standings
| | Conf. | | | Overall |
| Team | W | | L | W | | L |
|---|---|---|---|---|---|---|
| No. 6 Wheaton (IL) $^ | 7 | – | 0 | 12 | – | 1 |
| Augustana (IL) | 6 | – | 1 | 7 | – | 3 |
| Millikin | 4 | – | 3 | 7 | – | 3 |
| North Central (IL) | 4 | – | 3 | 7 | – | 3 |
| Elmhurst | 3 | – | 4 | 6 | – | 4 |
| Illinois Wesleyan | 3 | – | 4 | 5 | – | 5 |
| Carthage | 1 | – | 6 | 3 | – | 7 |
| North Park | 0 | – | 7 | 2 | – | 8 |
$ – Conference champion; ^ – NCAA Division III playoff participant; Rankings from D3football.com

2003 Empire 8 Athletic Conference football standings
| | Conf. | | | Overall |
| Team | W | | L | W | | L |
|---|---|---|---|---|---|---|
| No. 10 Ithaca $^ | 4 | – | 0 | 10 | – | 3 |
| St. John Fisher | 3 | – | 1 | 8 | – | 3 |
| Alfred | 2 | – | 2 | 5 | – | 5 |
| Hartwick | 1 | – | 3 | 2 | – | 7 |
| Utica | 0 | – | 4 | 1 | – | 9 |
$ – Conference champion; ^ – NCAA Division III playoff participant; Rankings from D3football.com

2003 Freedom Football Conference standings
| | Conf. | | | Overall |
| Team | W | | L | W | | L |
|---|---|---|---|---|---|---|
| No. 13 Springfield (MA) $^ | 6 | – | 0 | 10 | – | 1 |
| Norwich | 4 | – | 2 | 6 | – | 5 |
| Merchant Marine | 3 | – | 3 | 6 | – | 4 |
| Western Connecticut | 3 | – | 3 | 6 | – | 4 |
| Coast Guard | 3 | – | 3 | 4 | – | 5 |
| WPI | 2 | – | 4 | 4 | – | 6 |
| Plymouth State | 0 | – | 6 | 0 | – | 10 |
$ – Conference champion; ^ – NCAA Division III playoff participant; Rankings from D3football.com

2003 Heartland Collegiate Athletic Conference football standings
| | Conf. | | | Overall |
| Team | W | | L | W | | L |
|---|---|---|---|---|---|---|
| Hanover $^ | 6 | – | 0 | 8 | – | 3 |
| Anderson (IN) | 5 | – | 1 | 7 | – | 3 |
| Mount St. Joseph | 4 | – | 2 | 6 | – | 4 |
| Defiance | 3 | – | 3 | 4 | – | 6 |
| Franklin (IN) | 2 | – | 4 | 2 | – | 8 |
| Manchester | 1 | – | 5 | 2 | – | 8 |
| Bluffton | 0 | – | 6 | 2 | – | 8 |
$ – Conference champion; ^ – NCAA Division III playoff participant

2003 Illini–Badger Football Conference standings
| | Conf. | | | Overall |
| Team | W | | L | W | | L |
|---|---|---|---|---|---|---|
| Concordia (WI) $^ | 7 | – | 0 | 9 | – | 2 |
| Lakeland | 6 | – | 1 | 8 | – | 2 |
| Aurora | 5 | – | 2 | 5 | – | 5 |
| MacMurray | 3 | – | 4 | 5 | – | 5 |
| Greenville | 2 | – | 5 | 3 | – | 7 |
| Benedictine (IL) | 2 | – | 5 | 2 | – | 8 |
| Concordia (IL) | 2 | – | 5 | 2 | – | 8 |
| Eureka | 1 | – | 6 | 1 | – | 9 |
$ – Conference champion; ^ – NCAA Division III playoff participant

2003 Iowa Conference football standings
| | Conf. | | | Overall |
| Team | W | | L | W | | L |
|---|---|---|---|---|---|---|
| No. 4 Wartburg $^ | 8 | – | 0 | 11 | – | 1 |
| No. 23 Simpson (IA) | 7 | – | 1 | 9 | – | 2 |
| Loras | 5 | – | 3 | 7 | – | 3 |
| Buena Vista | 4 | – | 4 | 6 | – | 4 |
| Luther | 4 | – | 4 | 6 | – | 4 |
| Central (IA) | 3 | – | 5 | 5 | – | 5 |
| Coe | 3 | – | 5 | 5 | – | 5 |
| Cornell (IA) | 2 | – | 6 | 4 | – | 6 |
| Dubuque | 1 | – | 7 | 2 | – | 8 |
+ – Conference co-champions; ^ – NCAA Division III playoff participant; Rankings from D3football.com

2003 Michigan Intercollegiate Athletic Association football standings
| | Conf. | | | Overall |
| Team | W | | L | W | | L |
|---|---|---|---|---|---|---|
| Hope $^ | 5 | – | 1 | 7 | – | 4 |
| Adrian | 4 | – | 2 | 8 | – | 2 |
| Albion | 4 | – | 2 | 6 | – | 4 |
| Alma | 3 | – | 3 | 6 | – | 4 |
| Wisconsin Lutheran | 3 | – | 3 | 5 | – | 5 |
| Kalamazoo | 2 | – | 4 | 6 | – | 4 |
| Olivet | 0 | – | 6 | 4 | – | 6 |
$ – Conference champion; ^ – NCAA Division III playoff participant

2003 Middle Atlantic Conference football standings
| | Conf. | | | Overall |
| Team | W | | L | W | | L |
|---|---|---|---|---|---|---|
| No. 11 Lycoming $^ | 8 | – | 1 | 9 | – | 2 |
| Delaware Valley | 7 | – | 2 | 9 | – | 2 |
| Wilkes | 7 | – | 2 | 8 | – | 3 |
| Albright | 6 | – | 3 | 7 | – | 3 |
| King's (PA) | 6 | – | 3 | 7 | – | 4 |
| Widener | 4 | – | 5 | 5 | – | 5 |
| Susquehanna | 4 | – | 5 | 4 | – | 6 |
| Juniata | 3 | – | 6 | 3 | – | 7 |
| Moravian | 3 | – | 6 | 3 | – | 7 |
| Lebanon Valley | 1 | – | 8 | 1 | – | 9 |
| Fairleigh Dickinson–Florham | 0 | – | 9 | 1 | – | 9 |
$ – Conference champion; ^ – NCAA Division III playoff participant; Rankings from D3football.com

2003 Midwest Conference football standings
| | Conf. | | | Overall |
| Team | W | | L | W | | L |
|---|---|---|---|---|---|---|
| No. 16 St. Norbert $^ | 9 | – | 0 | 11 | – | 1 |
| Monmouth (IL) | 8 | – | 1 | 8 | – | 2 |
| Lake Forest | 6 | – | 3 | 7 | – | 3 |
| Ripon | 5 | – | 4 | 6 | – | 4 |
| Beloit | 3 | – | 6 | 4 | – | 6 |
| Illinois College | 3 | – | 6 | 4 | – | 6 |
| Knox | 3 | – | 6 | 4 | – | 6 |
| Carroll (WI) | 3 | – | 6 | 3 | – | 7 |
| Lawrence | 3 | – | 6 | 3 | – | 7 |
| Grinnell | 2 | – | 7 | 3 | – | 7 |
$ – Conference champion; ^ – NCAA Division III playoff participant; Rankings from D3football.com

2003 Minnesota Intercollegiate Athletic Conference football standings
| | Conf. | | | | | Overall |
| Team | W | | L | | T | W | | L | | T |
|---|---|---|---|---|---|---|---|---|---|---|
| No. 1 Saint John's (MN) $^ | 8 | – | 0 | – | 0 | 14 | – | 0 | – | 0 |
| No. 12 Bethel (MN) ^ | 7 | – | 1 | – | 0 | 9 | – | 2 | – | 0 |
| Concordia–Moorhead | 6 | – | 2 | – | 0 | 7 | – | 3 | – | 0 |
| Augsburg | 4 | – | 4 | – | 0 | 5 | – | 5 | – | 0 |
| Gustavus Adolphus | 4 | – | 4 | – | 0 | 4 | – | 6 | – | 0 |
| St. Olaf | 3 | – | 5 | – | 0 | 4 | – | 6 | – | 0 |
| St. Thomas (MN) | 3 | – | 5 | – | 0 | 3 | – | 7 | – | 0 |
| Carleton | 1 | – | 7 | – | 0 | 3 | – | 7 | – | 0 |
| Hamline | 0 | – | 8 | – | 0 | 2 | – | 8 | – | 0 |
$ – Conference champion; ^ – NCAA Division III playoff participant; Rankings from D3football.com

2003 New England Football Conference standings
| | Conf. | | | Overall |
| Team | W | | L | W | | L |
|---|---|---|---|---|---|---|
Bogan Division
| Westfield State xy | 6 | – | 0 | 7 | – | 3 |
| Worcester State | 5 | – | 1 | 8 | – | 3 |
| Bridgewater State | 4 | – | 2 | 6 | – | 3 |
| Fitchburg State | 3 | – | 3 | 5 | – | 4 |
| Massachusetts Maritime | 2 | – | 4 | 2 | – | 7 |
| Maine Maritime | 1 | – | 5 | 1 | – | 8 |
| Framingham State | 0 | – | 6 | 0 | – | 9 |
Boyd Division
| Curry xy$^ | 6 | – | 0 | 11 | – | 1 |
| UMass Dartmouth | 4 | – | 2 | 9 | – | 2 |
| Nichols | 4 | – | 2 | 6 | – | 4 |
| Endicott | 3 | – | 3 | 5 | – | 4 |
| Salve Regina | 2 | – | 4 | 2 | – | 8 |
| MIT | 1 | – | 5 | 3 | – | 6 |
| Western New England | 1 | – | 5 | 2 | – | 7 |
Championship: Curry 36, Westfield State 0
$ – Conference champion; x – Division champion/co-champions; y – Championship game participant; ^ – NCAA Division III playoff participant

2003 New England Small College Athletic Conference football standings
| | Conf. | | | Overall |
| Team | W | | L | W | | L |
|---|---|---|---|---|---|---|
| Trinity (CT) $ | 8 | – | 0 | 8 | – | 0 |
| Williams | 6 | – | 2 | 6 | – | 2 |
| Colby | 5 | – | 3 | 5 | – | 3 |
| Tufts | 5 | – | 3 | 5 | – | 3 |
| Amherst | 4 | – | 4 | 4 | – | 4 |
| Middlebury | 4 | – | 4 | 4 | – | 4 |
| Wesleyan | 4 | – | 4 | 4 | – | 4 |
| Bates | 2 | – | 6 | 2 | – | 6 |
| Hamilton | 2 | – | 6 | 2 | – | 6 |
| Bowdoin | 0 | – | 8 | 0 | – | 8 |
$ – Conference champion

2003 New Jersey Athletic Conference football standings
| | Conf. | | | Overall |
| Team | W | | L | W | | L |
|---|---|---|---|---|---|---|
| No. 17 Montclair State $^ | 5 | – | 0 | 9 | – | 2 |
| TCNJ | 4 | – | 1 | 6 | – | 4 |
| Rowan | 3 | – | 2 | 7 | – | 3 |
| Cortland | 2 | – | 3 | 5 | – | 5 |
| Kean | 1 | – | 4 | 1 | – | 9 |
| William Paterson | 0 | – | 5 | 1 | – | 9 |
$ – Conference champion; ^ – NCAA Division III playoff participant; Rankings from D3football.com

2003 North Coast Athletic Conference football standings
| | Conf. | | | Overall |
| Team | W | | L | W | | L |
|---|---|---|---|---|---|---|
| Allegheny $^ | 7 | – | 0 | 7 | – | 4 |
| Wittenberg | 4 | – | 2 | 8 | – | 2 |
| Wabash | 4 | – | 2 | 7 | – | 3 |
| Oberlin | 4 | – | 2 | 5 | – | 5 |
| Wooster | 4 | – | 3 | 7 | – | 3 |
| Ohio Wesleyan | 2 | – | 4 | 4 | – | 6 |
| Denison | 2 | – | 4 | 3 | – | 7 |
| Earlham | 1 | – | 5 | 2 | – | 8 |
| Hiram | 0 | – | 6 | 1 | – | 9 |
| Kenyon | 0 | – | 0 | 2 | – | 8 |
$ – Conference champion; ^ – NCAA Division III playoff participant

2003 Northwest Conference football standings
| | Conf. | | | Overall |
| Team | W | | L | W | | L |
|---|---|---|---|---|---|---|
| No. 3 Linfield $^ | 5 | – | 0 | 11 | – | 1 |
| Willamette | 4 | – | 1 | 7 | – | 3 |
| Pacific Lutheran | 3 | – | 2 | 6 | – | 3 |
| Whitworth | 2 | – | 3 | 4 | – | 6 |
| Lewis & Clark | 1 | – | 4 | 3 | – | 6 |
| Puget Sound | 0 | – | 5 | 0 | – | 9 |
$ – Conference champion; ^ – NCAA Division III playoff participant; Rankings from D3football.com

2003 Ohio Athletic Conference football standings
| | Conf. | | | Overall |
| Team | W | | L | W | | L |
|---|---|---|---|---|---|---|
| No. 2 Mount Union $^ | 9 | – | 0 | 13 | – | 1 |
| No. 9 Baldwin–Wallace ^ | 8 | – | 1 | 10 | – | 2 |
| Capital | 7 | – | 2 | 8 | – | 2 |
| John Carroll | 6 | – | 3 | 7 | – | 3 |
| Muskingum | 4 | – | 5 | 5 | – | 5 |
| Ohio Northern | 4 | – | 5 | 4 | – | 6 |
| Otterbein | 3 | – | 6 | 3 | – | 7 |
| Wilmington (OH) | 2 | – | 7 | 2 | – | 8 |
| Marietta | 1 | – | 8 | 2 | – | 8 |
| Heidelberg | 1 | – | 8 | 1 | – | 9 |
$ – Conference champion; ^ – NCAA Division III playoff participant; Rankings from D3football.com

2003 Old Dominion Athletic Conference football standings
| | Conf. | | | Overall |
| Team | W | | L | W | | L |
|---|---|---|---|---|---|---|
| No. 7 Bridgewater $^ | 6 | – | 0 | 12 | – | 2 |
| No. 21 Hampden–Sydney | 5 | – | 1 | 9 | – | 1 |
| Emory & Henry | 3 | – | 3 | 5 | – | 5 |
| Randolph–Macon | 3 | – | 3 | 4 | – | 6 |
| Catholic University | 2 | – | 4 | 3 | – | 7 |
| Washington and Lee | 1 | – | 5 | 3 | – | 7 |
| Guilford | 1 | – | 5 | 2 | – | 8 |
$ – Conference champion; ^ – NCAA Division III playoff participant; Rankings from D3football.com

2003 Presidents' Athletic Conference football standings
| | Conf. | | | Overall |
| Team | W | | L | W | | L |
|---|---|---|---|---|---|---|
| No. 22 Waynesburg $^ | 6 | – | 0 | 9 | – | 2 |
| Washington & Jefferson | 4 | – | 1 | 8 | – | 2 |
| Westminster (PA) | 3 | – | 2 | 5 | – | 5 |
| Grove City | 2 | – | 3 | 5 | – | 5 |
| Thiel | 1 | – | 4 | 3 | – | 7 |
| Bethany (WV) | 0 | – | 5 | 1 | – | 9 |
$ – Conference champion; ^ – NCAA Division III playoff participant; Rankings from D3football.com

2003 Southern California Intercollegiate Athletic Conference football standings
| | Conf. | | | Overall |
| Team | W | | L | W | | L |
|---|---|---|---|---|---|---|
| Redlands $^ | 5 | – | 1 | 6 | – | 4 |
| Occidental | 4 | – | 2 | 7 | – | 2 |
| Claremont-Mudd-Scripps | 4 | – | 2 | 6 | – | 3 |
| Cal Lutheran | 4 | – | 2 | 5 | – | 4 |
| Pomona-Pitzer | 3 | – | 3 | 5 | – | 4 |
| Whittier | 1 | – | 5 | 1 | – | 8 |
| La Verne | 0 | – | 6 | 1 | – | 8 |
$ – Conference champion; ^ – NCAA Division III playoff participant

2003 Southern Collegiate Athletic Conference football standings
| | Conf. | | | Overall |
| Team | W | | L | W | | L |
|---|---|---|---|---|---|---|
| Centre + | 5 | – | 1 | 8 | – | 2 |
| No. 24 Trinity (TX) +^ | 5 | – | 1 | 8 | – | 3 |
| Rhodes | 4 | – | 2 | 7 | – | 3 |
| DePauw | 3 | – | 3 | 5 | – | 5 |
| Rose–Hulman | 3 | – | 3 | 5 | – | 5 |
| Millsaps | 1 | – | 5 | 1 | – | 9 |
| Sewanee | 0 | – | 6 | 3 | – | 7 |
+ – Conference co-champions; ^ – NCAA Division III playoff participant; Rankings from D3football.com

2003 University Athletic Association football standings
| | Conf. | | | Overall |
| Team | W | | L | W | | L |
|---|---|---|---|---|---|---|
| Washington University $ | 3 | – | 0 | 6 | – | 4 |
| Carnegie Mellon | 2 | – | 1 | 6 | – | 4 |
| Chicago | 1 | – | 2 | 2 | – | 7 |
| Case Western Reserve | 0 | – | 3 | 5 | – | 5 |
$ – Conference champion

2003 Upper Midwest Athletic Conference football standings
| | Conf. | | | Overall |
| Team | W | | L | W | | L |
|---|---|---|---|---|---|---|
North
| Martin Luther x | 5 | – | 2 | 7 | – | 2 |
| Northwestern (MN) x | 5 | – | 2 | 6 | – | 4 |
| Minnesota Morris | 4 | – | 2 | 5 | – | 6 |
| Crown | 3 | – | 4 | 4 | – | 7 |
| Trinity Bible | 0 | – | 7 | 0 | – | 9 |
South
| Westminster (MO) x$ | 7 | – | 0 | 7 | – | 2 |
| Rockford | 5 | – | 1 | 7 | – | 3 |
| Principia | 2 | – | 5 | 3 | – | 6 |
| Maranatha Baptist | 2 | – | 5 | 2 | – | 7 |
| Blackburn | 1 | – | 6 | 2 | – | 8 |
$ – Conference champion; x – Division champion/co-champions

2003 Upstate Collegiate Athletic Association football standings
| | Conf. | | | Overall |
| Team | W | | L | W | | L |
|---|---|---|---|---|---|---|
| No. 5 RPI +^ | 3 | – | 1 | 11 | – | 2 |
| Hobart + | 3 | – | 1 | 6 | – | 4 |
| Rochester (NY) | 2 | – | 2 | 5 | – | 5 |
| Union (NY) | 2 | – | 2 | 5 | – | 5 |
| St. Lawrence | 0 | – | 4 | 2 | – | 8 |
+ – Conference co-champions; ^ – NCAA Division III playoff participant; Rankings from D3football.com

2003 USA South Athletic Conference football standings
| | Conf. | | | Overall |
| Team | W | | L | W | | L |
|---|---|---|---|---|---|---|
| Shenandoah + | 5 | – | 1 | 8 | – | 2 |
| No. 19 Christopher Newport +^ | 5 | – | 1 | 8 | – | 3 |
| Ferrum | 3 | – | 2 | 6 | – | 4 |
| Averett | 3 | – | 3 | 5 | – | 4 |
| Methodist | 3 | – | 3 | 4 | – | 5 |
| Greensboro | 1 | – | 5 | 3 | – | 7 |
| Chowan | 0 | – | 5 | 2 | – | 7 |
+ – Conference co-champions; ^ – NCAA Division III playoff participant; Rankings from D3football.com

2003 Wisconsin Intercollegiate Athletic Conference football standings
| | Conf. | | | Overall |
| Team | W | | L | W | | L |
|---|---|---|---|---|---|---|
| No. 8 Wisconsin–La Crosse $^ | 6 | – | 1 | 10 | – | 2 |
| No. 18 Wisconsin–Stevens Point | 5 | – | 2 | 8 | – | 2 |
| Wisconsin–Whitewater | 5 | – | 2 | 7 | – | 3 |
| Wisconsin–Stout | 4 | – | 3 | 6 | – | 4 |
| Wisconsin–Eau Claire | 4 | – | 3 | 5 | – | 5 |
| Wisconsin–River Falls | 2 | – | 5 | 2 | – | 7 |
| Wisconsin–Oshkosh | 1 | – | 6 | 4 | – | 6 |
| Wisconsin–Platteville | 1 | – | 6 | 3 | – | 7 |
$ – Conference champion; ^ – NCAA Division III playoff participant; Rankings from D3football.com

2003 NCAA Division III independents football records
| | Conf. | | | Overall |
| Team | W | | L | W | | L |
|---|---|---|---|---|---|---|
| No. 20 Brockport ^ | | – | | 9 | – | 2 |
| Menlo | | – | | 7 | – | 3 |
| Thomas More | | – | | 6 | – | 4 |
| Mount Ida | | – | | 4 | – | 6 |
| Chapman | | – | | 3 | – | 7 |
| Colorado College | | – | | 2 | – | 7 |
| Buffalo State | | – | | 2 | – | 8 |
| Maryville (TN) | | – | | 2 | – | 8 |
| Macalester | | – | | 1 | – | 8 |
| Huntingdon | | – | | 0 | – | 7 |
| Husson | | – | | 0 | – | 7 |
^ – NCAA Division III playoff participant; Rankings from D3football.com

== Conference champions ==
Conference champions
- American Southwest Conference – East Texas Baptist, Hardin–Simmons, and Mary Hardin–Baylor
- Atlantic Central Football Conference – Frostburg State
- Centennial Conference – Johns Hopkins and Muhlenberg
- College Conference of Illinois and Wisconsin – Wheaton (IL)
- Empire 8 Conference – Ithaca
- Freedom Football Conference‡ – Springfield
- Heartland Collegiate Athletic Conference – Hanover
- Illini-Badger Football Conference – Concordia (WI)
- Iowa Intercollegiate Athletic Conference – Wartburg
- Michigan Intercollegiate Athletic Association – Hope
- Middle Atlantic Conference – Lycoming
- Midwest Conference – St. Norbert
- Minnesota Intercollegiate Athletic Conference – Saint John's (MN)
- New England Football Conference – Westfield State (Bogan Division), Curry (Boyd Division)
  - Championship Game: Curry 36, Westfield State 0
- New England Small College Athletic Conference – Trinity (CT)
- New Jersey Athletic Conference – Montclair State
- North Coast Athletic Conference – Allegheny
- Northwest Conference – Linfield
- Ohio Athletic Conference – Mount Union
- Old Dominion Athletic Conference – Bridgewater
- Presidents' Athletic Conference – Waynesburg
- Southern California Intercollegiate Athletic Conference – Redlands
- Southern Collegiate Athletic Conference – Centre and Trinity (TX)
- University Athletic Association – Washington–Saint Louis
- Upper Midwest Athletic Conference – Westminster (MO)
- Upstate Collegiate Athletic Conference – Hobart and RPI
- USA South Athletic Conference – Christopher Newport and Shenandoah
- Wisconsin Intercollegiate Athletic Conference – Wisconsin–La Crosse

== Postseason ==
The 2003 NCAA Division III Football Championship playoffs were the 31st annual single-elimination tournament to determine the national champion of men's NCAA Division III college football. The championship Stagg Bowl game was held at Salem Football Stadium in Salem, Virginia for the 11th time. This was the fifth bracket to feature 28 teams since last expanding in 1999.

=== Playoff bracket ===
First Round; Campus Sites
UW–La Crosse | 52
Concordia Wisconsin | 13
Wheaton (IL) | 55
Hope | 45
Baldwin Wallace | 54
Hanover | 32
East Texas Baptist | 42
Trinity (TX) | 41
Bridgewater (VA) | 28
Waynesburg | 24
Christopher Newport | 24
Muhlenberg | 20
RPI | 34
Curry | 20
Ithaca | 14
Brockport | 9
Montclair State | 20
Allegheny | 19
St. Norbert | 26**
Simpson | 20
Wartburg | 21
Bethel (MN) | 7
Linfield | 31
Redlands | 23

Second Round; Campus Sites
Mount Union | 39
UW–La Crosse | 14
Wheaton (IL) | 16
Baldwin Wallace | 12
Lycoming | 16*
East Texas Baptist | 15
Bridgewater (VA) | 26
Christopher Newport | 3
Springfield | 34
RPI | 40
Ithaca | 33
Montclair State | 13
Saint John's (MN) | 38
St. Norbert | 13
Wartburg | 20
Linfield | 23

Quarterfinals; Campus Sites
Mount Union | 56
Wheaton (IL) | 10
Lycoming | 9
Bridgewater (VA) | 13
RPI | 21
Ithaca | 16
Saint John's (MN) | 31
Linfield | 25

Semifinals; Campus Sites
Mount Union | 66
Bridgewater (VA) | 0
RPI | 10
Saint John's (MN) | 38

National Championship Game; Salem Football Stadium; Salem, Virginia
Mount Union | 6
Saint John's (MN) | 24

* Overtime

== Final D3football.com Poll ==
| Team | Final Record | Points |
|---|---|---|
| 1. St. John's (MN) (25) | 14–0 | 625 |
| 2. Mount Union | 13–1 | 595 |
| 3. Linfield | 11–1 | 575 |
| 4. Wartburg | 11–1 | 489 |
| 5. RPI | 11–2 | 483 |
| 6. Wheaton (IL) | 12–1 | 475 |
| 7. Bridgewater | 12–2 | 453 |
| 8. Wisconsin–La Crosse | 10–2 | 441 |
| 9. Baldwin–Wallace | 10–2 | 399 |
| 10. Ithaca | 10–3 | 355 |
| 11. Lycoming | 9–2 | 353 |
| 12. Bethel (MN) | 9–2 | 342 |
| 13. Springfield | 10–1 | 336 |
| 14. East Texas Baptist | 9–3 | 259 |
| 15. Mary Hardin–Baylor | 9–1 | 234 |
| 16. St. Norbert | 11–1 | 218 |
| 17. Montclair State | 9–2 | 189 |
| 18. Wisconsin–Stevens Point | 8–2 | 176 |
| 19. Christopher Newport | 8–3 | 175 |
| 20. Brockport | 9–2 | 163 |
| 21. Hampden–Sydney | 9–1 | 140 |
| 22. Waynesburg | 9–2 | 103 |
| 23. Simpson (IA) | 9–2 | 81 |
| 24. Trinity (TX) | 8–3 | 66 |
| 25. Johns Hopkins | 10–1 | 60 |

Others receiving votes: 26. Capital 50, 27. Hardin–Simmons 47, 28. Allegheny 42, 29. Trinity (CT) 38, 30. Redlands 22, 31. Hope 21, 32. Wisconsin–Whitewater 19, 32. Hanover 19, 34. Curry 18, 35. Concordia (WI) 16, 36. Washington & Jefferson 12, 37. Muhlenberg 9, 38. Rowan 7, 38. Augustana (IL) 7, 40. Delaware Valley 6, 41. Menlo 3, 42. Willamette 2, 43. New Jersey State 1, 43. Shenandoah 1.

== Awards ==
Gagliardi Trophy: Blake Elliott

AFCA Coach of the Year: John Gagliardi

AFCA Regional Coach of the Year: Region 1: Mike DeLong, Springfield College Region 2: Jeff Hand, Waynesburg College Region 3: Ralph Harris, East Texas Baptist University Region 4: Mike Swider, Wheaton College Region 5: John Gagliardi, St. John’s University (Minn.)

== See also ==
- 2003 NCAA Division I-A football season
- 2003 NCAA Division I-AA football season
- 2003 NCAA Division II football season
