= Blake Elliott =

American football player (born 1981)

No. 2
- Position: Wide receiver

Personal information
- Born: February 19, 1981 (age 45); Melrose, Minnesota, U.S.
- Listed height: 6 ft 2 in (1.88 m)
- Listed weight: 215 lb (98 kg)

Career information
- High school: Melrose (MN)
- College: Saint John's (2000–2003)

Awards and highlights
- Stagg Bowl champion (2003); Stagg Bowl Most Outstanding Player (2003); Gagliardi Trophy (2003); 2× First-team DIII All-American (2002, 2003); 2× MIAC Player of the Year (2002, 2003); 3× First-team All-MIAC (2001–2003)
- College Football Hall of Fame (Class of 2025)

Blake Elliott (born February 19, 1981) is an American former college football wide receiver who played for the Saint John's Johnnies, earning the 2003 Gagliardi Trophy for academic and football excellence covering all of NCAA Division III. Elliott was inducted into the College Football Hall of Fame in 2025.

== Early life ==
He graduated from Melrose High School in Melrose, Minnesota.

== College career ==
Elliott attended the College of Saint Benedict and Saint John's University in Collegeville, Minnesota, and he played college football for the Saint John's Johnnies from 2000 to 2003. He owns several school, conference, and national records in NCAA football. In his senior year, he led the Johnnies to the NCAA Division III Football Championship over previously unbeaten Mount Union Purple Raiders.

== Professional career ==
Elliott was not selected in the 2004 NFL draft, and he signed as an undrafted free agent with the Minnesota Vikings on April 25, 2004. He was placed on injured reserve in June after fracturing his left fibula and tearing his tendon. He spent the entire 2004 season on injured reserve and was released by the Vikings in April 2005.
