= 1965 Saint John's Johnnies football team =

American college football season

1965 Saint John's Johnnies football

NAIA national champion MIAC champion

Champion Bowl, W 33–0 vs. Linfield
- Conference: Minnesota Intercollegiate Athletic Conference
- Record: 11–0 (7–0 MIAC)
- Head coach: John Gagliardi (13th season)
- Home stadium: Saint John's Stadium

1965 Minnesota Intercollegiate Athletic Conference football standings
	Conf.					Overall
Team	W		L		T	W		L		T
No. 1 Saint John's (MN) $^	7	–	0	–	0	11	–	0	–	0
No. 19 Concordia (MN)	5	–	2	–	0	6	–	2	–	0
St. Thomas (MN)	4	–	2	–	1	4	–	4	–	1
Gustavus Adolphus	4	–	3	–	0	5	–	4	–	0
Minnesota–Duluth	3	–	4	–	0	4	–	5	–	0
Augsburg	2	–	4	–	1	3	–	5	–	1
Hamline	2	–	5	–	0	3	–	6	–	0
Macalester	0	–	7	–	0	0	–	8	–	0
$ – Conference champion; ^ – NAIA playoff participant; Rankings from NAIA poll

The 1965 Saint John's Johnnies football team was an American football team that represented Saint John's University as a member of the Minnesota Intercollegiate Athletic Conference (MIAC) during the 1965 NAIA football season. In their 13th season under head coach John Gagliardi, the Johnnies compiled an 11–0 record (7–0 against conference opponents) and won the MIAC championship. The team advanced to the National Association of Intercollegiate Athletics playoff and won the NAIA national championship with a 33–0 victory over Linfield Wildcats in the Champion Bowl. It was the second of four national championships for the Saint John's Johnnies football program under head coach John Gagliardi.

On defense, the team opened the season with four consecutive shutouts and held seven of eleven opponents scoreless. In all 11 games, the defense gave up only 27 points, an average of 2.5 points per game. They gave up an average of only 112.1 yards of total offense per game. On offense, the Johnnies averaged 233 rushing yards per game, led by halfback Jim Shiely's 823 rushing yards.

Gagliardi was named NAIA Coach of the Year, and junior defensive back Pat Whalin was named to the first team on the Little All-America team. Eight Saint John's player were named to the 1965 All-MIAC team.

== Schedule ==
Date	Opponent	Site	Result	Attendance	Source
September 11	River Falls*	Saint John's Stadium; Collegeville, MN	W 16–0		
September 18	Bemidji State*	St. John's Stadium; Collegeville, MN	W 7–0		
September 25	at Macalester	Macalester Stadium; St. Paul, MN	W 48–0		
October 1	at St. Thomas (MN)	O'Shaughnessy Field; St. Paul, MN	W 10–0		
October 9	Hamline^{†}	St. John's Stadium; Collegeville, MN	W 34–6		
October 16	at Minnesota–Duluth	Duluth, MN	W 17–8		
October 23	Gustavus Adolphus	Saint John's Stadium; Collegeville, MN	W 34–0		
October 30	at Augsburg	Minneapolis, MN	W 28–6		
November 6	Concordia (MN)	Saint John's Stadium; Collegeville, MN	W 10–0	8,000	
November 27	vs. Fairmont State*	Metropolitan Stadium; Bloomington, MN (NAIA semifinal)	W 28–7	4,325	
December 11	vs. Linfield*	Richmond Stadium; Augusta, GA (Champion Bowl)	W 33–0	4,843	
*Non-conference game; ^{†}Homecoming

== Post-season ==
The Johnnies advanced to the NAIA playoffs and defeated Fairmont State in the semifinals by a 28–7 score at Metropolitan Stadium in Bloomington, Minnesota. The game was played on a frozen field with a temperature of 15 degrees and a 23 mile-per-hour wind. Fullback Stan Suchta rushed for 124 yards and was named the game's most valuable player.

On December 11, Saint John's faced the Linfield Wildcats from Oregon in the NAIA national championship game which was then known as the Champion Bowl. Saint John's dominated the game, intercepting four Linfield passes and holding Linfield to 43 yards of total offense (28 rushing, 15 passing). The final score was 33–0. Suchta rushed for 91 yards and three touchdowns and was selected as the game's most valuable player. The victory gave Saint John's its second NAIA Football National Championship in three years.

== Awards and honors ==
Coach Gagliardi was named MIAC Coach of the Year and NAIA Coach of the Year. He led Saint John's to its second NAIA championship in three years and compiled an 82–26–2 record in his first 13 years at the school. Gagliardi later became the winningest coach in college football history and was inducted into the College Football Hall of Fame.

Tackle Mike Collins received the "Golden Helmet" award presented by Coca Cola Co. and the Twin Cities Sportcasters Association as the top football player and scholar among Minnesota's college football teams.

Three Saint John's players were included on the Associated Press' Little All-America team. Junior defensive back Pat Whalin was named to the first team, and offensive tackle Fred Cremer was named to the second team. Mike Collins received honorable mention.

Eight Saint John's players were named to the All-MIAC team selected by the conference coaches: halfback Jim Shiely; offensive end Dave Griffen; offensive tackle Mike Collins (the only unanimous pick); center Dennis Sharkey; defensive tackle Fred Cremer; defensive end Joe Mucha; linebacker John Ford; and defensive halfback Pat Whalin.
