= 1976 Saint John's Johnnies football team =

American college football season

1976 Saint John's Johnnies football

NCAA Division III champion MIAC champion

Stagg Bowl, W 31–28 vs. Towson State
- Conference: Minnesota Intercollegiate Athletic Conference
- Record: 10–0–1 (7–0 MIAC)
- Head coach: John Gagliardi (24th season)
- Home stadium: Clemens Stadium

1976 Minnesota Intercollegiate Athletic Conference football standings
	Conf.					Overall
Team	W		L		T	W		L		T
Saint John's (MN) $^	7	–	0	–	0	10	–	0	–	1
St. Olaf	5	–	2	–	0	7	–	3	–	0
St. Thomas (MN)	5	–	2	–	0	7	–	3	–	0
Concordia–Moorhead	5	–	2	–	0	6	–	3	–	0
Gustavus Adolphus	3	–	4	–	0	5	–	5	–	0
Hamline	2	–	5	–	0	4	–	5	–	0
Augsburg	1	–	6	–	0	1	–	8	–	0
Macalester	0	–	7	–	0	0	–	8	–	0
$ – Conference champion; ^ – NCAA Division III playoff participant; St. Thomas (MN) received a non-conference forfeit win from St. Cloud State.

The 1976 Saint John's Johnnies football team represented Saint John's University as a member of the Minnesota Intercollegiate Athletic Conference (MIAC) during the 1976 NCAA Division III football season. In their 24th season under head coach John Gagliardi, the Johnnies compiled a 10–0–1 record and won the NCAA Division III national championship.

After opening the season playing Minnesota Morris to a 15–15 tie, the Johnnies won 10 consecutive games, including victories over Augustana (IL) and Buena Vista in the NCAA Division III playoffs.

The Johnnies closed their season facing Towson State in the Amos Alonzo Stagg Bowl to determine the Division III championship. Saint John's took a 28-0 lead through three quarters, but Towson State scored 28 points in the fourth quarter to tie the score. Saint John's kicker Jeff Norman kicked a 19-yard field goal with one second remaining to secure the victory.

Eight Saint John's players were included on the 1976 All-MIAC team: quarterback Jeff Norman; fullback Tim Schmitz; running back Jim Roeder; offensive lineman Dave Grovum; defensive lineman Ernie England, Terry Sexton and Joe Wentzel; and defensive back Joe Luby.

Coach Gagliardi received the 1976 NCAA Division III Coach of the Year award. Gagliardi became college football all-time winningest coach and was inducted into the College Football Hall of Fame in 2006.

The team played its home games at Clemens Stadium in Collegeville, Minnesota.

== Schedule ==
Date	Opponent	Site	Result	Attendance	Source
September 11	Minnesota Morris*	Clemens Stadium; Collegeville, MN	T 15–15	8,500	
September 18	at Hamline	Norton Field; St. Paul, MN	W 57–28		
September 25	at St. Thomas (MN)	O'Shaughnessy Field; St. Paul, MN	W 14–11	8,000	
October 2	Augsburg	Clemens Stadium; Collegeville, MN	W 62–12	9,500	
October 16	Concordia–Moorhead	Clemens Stadium; Collegeville, MN	W 49–0	8,000	
October 23	at Macalester	Mac Field; St. Paul, MN	W 70–13		
October 30	Gustavus Adolphus	Clemens Stadium; Collegeville, MN	W 44–14	7,500	
November 6	at St. Olaf	Manitou Field; Northfield, MN	W 29–13		
November 20	at Augustana (IL)*	Ericson Field; Rock Island, IL (NCAA Division III first round)	W 46–7		
November 27	Buena Vista*	Clemens Stadium; Collegeville, MN (NCAA Division III semifinal)	W 61–0	2,112	
December 4	vs. Towson State*	Phenix Municipal Stadium; Phenix City, AL (Stagg Bowl—NCAA Division III championship game)	W 31–28	7,214	
*Non-conference game
