= Saint John's Johnnies and Saint Benedict Bennies =

- University: College of Saint Benedict and Saint John's University
- Nickname: Johnnies; Bennies
- Division: Division III
- Conference: NCAA
- Football stadium: Clemens Stadium
- Basketball arena: William Sexton Arena (SJU); Claire Lynch Hall (CSB)
- Baseball stadium: ????
- Softball stadium: CSB Outdoor Athletic Complex
- Soccer stadium: Haws Field (SJU); CSB Outdoor Athletic Complex
- Lacrosse stadium: CSB Outdoor Athletic Complex
- Volleyball arena: Claire Lynch Hall (CSB)
- Colors: Red and blue

The Saint John's Johnnies and Saint Benedict Bennies are the athletics teams of the College of Saint Benedict and Saint John's University. Both are members of the Division III level of the National Collegiate Athletic Association (NCAA), competing in the Minnesota Intercollegiate Athletic Conference (MIAC).

Their athletic teams are known as the Johnnies (men's) and Bennies (women's).

== Varsity sports ==
Saint John's (men's)	Saint Benedict (women's)
Baseball	Basketball
Basketball	Cross country
Cross country	Golf
Football	Ice hockey
Golf	Lacrosse
Ice hockey	Soccer
Soccer	Softball
Swimming	Swimming
Tennis	Tennis
Track and field	Track and field
Wrestling	Volleyball

== Saint John's (SJU) ==
Saint John's (SJU) has been in the MIAC since the 1920–21 academic year, and competes in 11 intercollegiate varsity sports, which are: baseball, basketball, cross country, football, golf, ice hockey, soccer, swimming & diving, tennis, track & field and wrestling.

=== Baseball ===
The Johnnies finished the 2012 season second with a MIAC record of 14–6 and a total of 29 wins. This tied an SJU record for most wins in a season. The team also qualified for the NCAA tournament for the first time since 1998. This was the third time the Johnnies were able to claim the MIAC Playoff championship. The head coach, Jerry Haugen, has coached the SJU baseball team for 36 seasons with a career record of 665–567–5. He is in the top 25 on the NCAA Division III most winning active coaches win list.

=== Basketball ===
SJU tied for fifth and played in the playoffs. The SJU basketball team ended the 2012–2013 season with a loss to Augsburg in the quarterfinal round of the MIAC playoffs. Their record for the season was 74–67. Three Johnnies earned All-MIAC recognition. The head coach of this team is Jim Smith, and he has a 755–535 career record. The 2013–2014 season will be his 50th season coaching the Johnnies.

=== Cross country ===
The cross country team of Saint John's finished fourth of 27 teams at the NCAA Central Regional. They followed behind St. Olaf, Central of Iowa, and Luther of Iowa. The Johnnies were ranked seventh in regular season. The 2012 SJU cross country team earned U.S. Track & Field Cross Country Coaches' Association All-Academic recognition.

=== Football ===
St. John's is widely known for its football program, which consistently ranks in the top 25 in the nation at the NCAA Division III level. They had a 653–251–24 record following the 2019 season. SJU is a 34-time conference champion, and four-time national champion, having most recently won in 2003 against the University of Mount Union by a score of 24–6. Their former rivalry with the nearby University of St. Thomas, who in 2021 moved to NCAA Division I, was considered to be one of the greatest rivalries in Division III football, with games regularly drawing tens of thousands of fans and national media attention. Former St. John's offensive tackle Ben Bartch was drafted in the 4th round (116th overall) by Jacksonville Jaguars in the 2020 NFL draft. He is the first MIAC player to be drafted into the NFL since 2003.

=== Golf ===
The 2012 SJU golf team was ranked third in the final Golf World/Nike Golf Coaches' Division III poll. They were ranked behind Oglethorpe (Ga.) and Methodist (N.C.). The Johnnies moved up a total of 15 spots throughout the year.

=== Ice hockey ===
The 2012–2013 SJU hockey season ended in the first round of the NCAA Division III Men's Hockey Tournament in Eau Claire, Wisconsin. The Johnnies lost to Wisconsin-Eau Claire 4–2. Wisconsin was ranked fourth and had beaten the Johnnies earlier in the season 5 to 1. SJU's record was 16–8–4 (9–4–3 MIAC).

=== Rugby ===
Thomas Haigh, an instructor in the St. John's department of mathematics, founded the St. John's Rugby Club in the spring of 1968. A former St. John's Prep School student, he learned the game while an undergraduate at the University of Wisconsin. Rugby is a club sport at Saint John's. The Saint John's University rugby team captured the National Small College championship with a 31–16 win over Duke University Sunday, April 28, 2013, at Infinity Park, Glendale, Colo. They repeated this accomplishment again, defeating New England College 37–25 in a comeback win on April 27, 2014, at Infinity Park. A total of 211 teams competed for the National Small College championship, which is based on men's enrollment (schools must have fewer than 4,500 male students to compete in this division).

=== Soccer ===
SJU opened its new soccer complex in the 2013 season. In 2012, the Johnnies ended the soccer season with a 9-6-4 (6-2-2 MIAC) record and finished fourth.

=== Track and field ===
The SJU track and field team is the reigning MIAC outdoor champion for 2023 and won the indoor and outdoor championships in 2022. Saint John's 4x100 meter team also won the NCAA Division III national championship in 2019 with a team of Nick Gannon, Drew Shanebaur, Brady Labine, and Ryan Miller.

=== Wrestling ===
Seniors Mitch Hagen and Chris Stevermer will compete at the NCAA Division III Championships on March 15–16. Hagen is ranked fourth in the 2013 tournament. Stevermer was third at regionals and is unranked in the tournament. Both competed in the tournament in 2012, but lost against higher-ranked opponents. Four other Johnnies will compete in the national tournament. Ryan Arne, Ryan Michaelis, John Scepaniak, and Nick Schuler are all appearing at the national tournament for the first time.

=== Lacrosse ===
The club was founded in 1986 by Peter Farrell, under faculty advisement of Brother Dietrich Reinhardt, OSB. The club is a non-varsity, athletic program affiliated with and partially funded by SJU Student Services. A student board of directors consists of a president, vice-president, treasurer and secretaries that help run the administrative part of the club. The Johnnies participate in the Men's College Lacrosse Association and the Upper Midwest Lacrosse Conference. The Johnnies have been the UMLC Division II Champions in 2004, 2005, 2007, 2008, 2011 and 2014. They have earned a trip to the MCLA Division II National Championship Tournament in 2005, 2006, 2007, 2008, 2009, 2010, 2011, 2012, 2013 and 2014—appearing in the Final Four of the Tournament in 2006, 2007, 2009, 2013 and 2014. The streak of 10-straight appearances in the National Championship Tournament is an MCLA record. The Johnnies were the National Runner-Up in 2006, 2007 and 2014.

=== Facilities ===
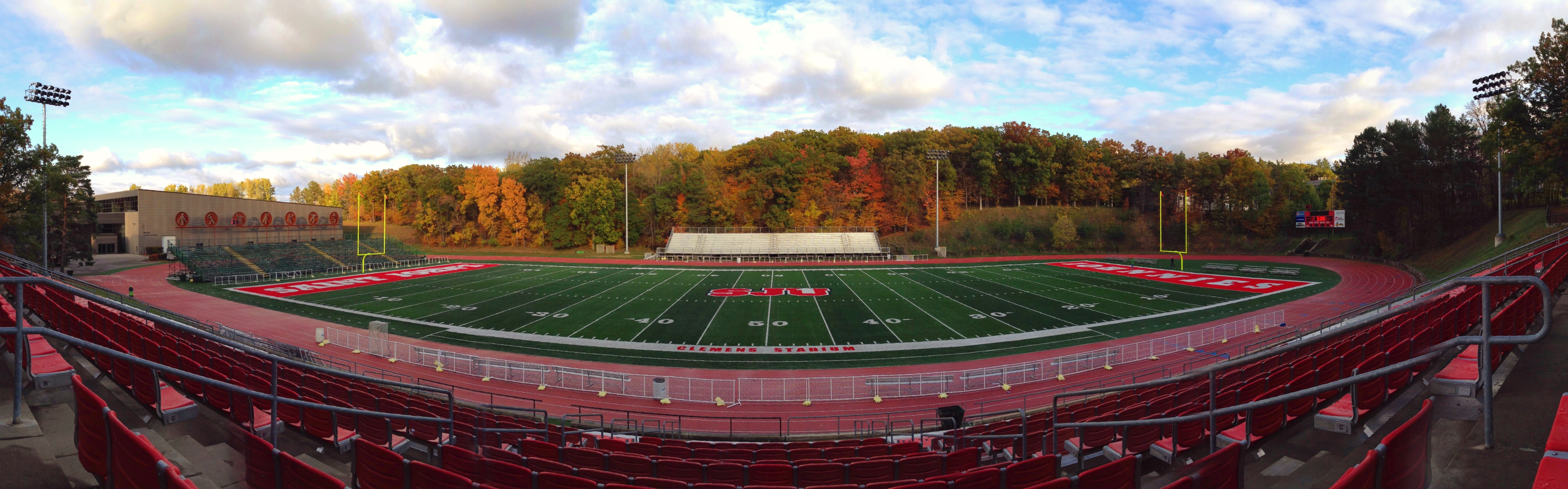
Clemens Stadium, home to the SJU football team

Venue	Sport(s)	Open.	Ref.
Clemens Stadium	Football	1908	
Becker Park	Baseball	2013	
William Sexton Arena	Basketball	1973	
Haws Field	Soccer	2012	
Donald McNeely Spectrum	Track and field (indoor); Tennis; Wrestling		

== Saint Benedict athletics (CSB) ==
Saint Benedict (CSB) joined the MIAC in the 1985–86 academic year, and competes in 12 intercollegiate varsity sports, which are: basketball, cross country, golf, ice hockey, lacrosse, soccer, softball, swimming & diving, tennis, track & field and volleyball. In 2019 the athletic teams at CSB were officially rebranded from the "Blazers" to the "Bennies".

In the history of CSB Athletics, 36 teams have won conference titles and seven other playoff titles, while making 53 team and 80 individual national postseason appearances. CSB finished second in the MIAC All-Sports rankings in both 2023 and 2024. CSB has had 1,033 all-conference student-athletes, 110 All-Americans, and 24 conference coaches of the year.

=== Basketball ===
CSB basketball has won 15 conference titles. CSB basketball coach Mike Durbin is MIAC career wins leader and celebrated his 500th win in the 2008–2009 basketball season.

=== Cross country and track & field ===
CSB runner Fiona Smith has won six individual NCAA DIII National Championships in 2023 and 2024, including indoor 3K & 5K (2023 and 2024), cross country (2023), and outdoor 5K (2024). Bennie Jaylyn Ahlberg also qualified for the 2024 NCAA DIII women's outdoor pole vault.

=== Golf ===
CSB golf is coached by Daryl Schomer, who started as head coach in the 2011–2012 season. In his first season at CSB as head coach, Schomer led the Blazers to finish third in the MIAC. The Blazers finished in fifth place at the 2012 MIAC Championships. The Blazers shot the seventh-best round of the tournament in the final round, led by a 79 from Bridget Cummings, who placed 11th individually.

=== Soccer ===
CSB soccer has won five conference titles.

=== Swimming and diving ===
In 2024, CSB Swim & Dive was named a CSCAA Scholar All-American Team, for the 13th straight year.

=== Hockey ===
Bennie hockey is coached by Lindsay Macy and assisted by Dale Sager.

=== Volleyball ===
CSB volleyball had made appearances in the NCAA National Tournament 14 times, most recently in 2012, and has won the MIAC Conference Championship seven times, most recently in 2009. The volleyball team has been coached by Nicole Hess since 2009, with assistant coaches Amanda Anderson, Theresa Naumann, and Heather Piper-Olsen. Coach Nicole Hess achieved her 100th win as a coach on November 1, 2011, against Gustavus Adolphus College.

=== Facilities ===
Venue	Sport(s)	Ref.
Claire Lynch Hall	Basketball; Volleyball	
CSB Outdoor Athletic Complex	Soccer; Softball; Lacrosse	
CSB Athletic Field	Lacrosse	

== Club sports ==
CSB and SJU offer a variety of club sports for students to stay active and involved. At SJU, club sports include hockey, crew, lacrosse, Nordic skiing, rugby, clay target team, ultimate Frisbee, and volleyball. At CSB, club sports include crew, dance team, figure skating, lacrosse, Nordic skiing, rugby, soccer, clay target team, ultimate Frisbee, and volleyball.

Saint John's	Saint Benedict
Clay target	Dance team
Lacrosse	Figure skating
Nordic skiing	Lacrosse
Rowing	Nordic skiing
Rugby union	Rowing
Wrestling	Rugby union
	Soccer
	Ultimate fresbee

=== Non-NCAA national team championships ===
Men’s (1)

  - Australian rules football (1): 2008
