= Ross Fortier =

American football, basketball and baseball coach

Biographical details
- Born: c. 1937 (age 88–89)
- Education: North Dakota State

Playing career

Football
- 1957–1959: North Dakota State
- Position: Quarterback

Coaching career (HC unless noted)

Football
- 1960–1961: North Dakota State (assistant)
- 1962–1963: Melrose HS (MN)
- 1964–1966: Moorhead State (assistant)
- 1967–1969: North Dakota State (assistant)
- 1970–1992: Moorhead State

Basketball
- 1962–1964: Melrose HS (MN) (assistant)
- 1964–1967: Moorhead State (assistant)

Baseball
- 1962: North Dakota State
- 1963–1964: Melrose HS (MN)

Head coaching record
- Overall: 152–80–4 (college football); 5–10 (college baseball)
- Tournaments: 2–6 (NAIA D-I playoffs)

Accomplishments and honors

Championships
- Football; 9 NIC (1971, 1973, 1979, 1981–1982, 1984, 1988–1989, 1991)

Awards
- NAIA Coaches Hall of Fame; NDSU Hall of Fame (1979); NIC Hall of Fame (2003)

Ross Fortier (born c. 1937) is a retired American football, basketball and baseball coach. He served as the head baseball coach at North Dakota State University (1962) before becoming the head football coach at Moorhead State College—now known as Minnesota State University Moorhead. During his 23 years as the head coach at MSU–Moorhead, he led the Dragons to nine conference championships and seven playoff appearances. He was inducted to the North Dakota State University Hall of Fame in 1979.

== Head coaching record ==
=== College football ===
Year	Team	Overall	Conference	Standing	Bowl/playoffs
Moorhead State Dragons (Northern Intercollegiate Conference) (1970–1992)
1970	Moorhead State	4–4–1	3–3	4th	
1971	Moorhead State	7–1–1	6–0	1st	
1972	Moorhead State	7–3	4–3	3rd	
1973	Moorhead State	7–3	5–1	1st	
1974	Moorhead State	4–5	3–3	T–3rd	
1975	Moorhead State	2–7	2–4	5th	
1976	Moorhead State	5–5	3–4	T–5th	
1977	Moorhead State	6–4	5–2	T–2nd	
1978	Moorhead State	6–5	5–3	4th	
1979	Moorhead State	8–3	7–1	T–1st	
1980	Moorhead State	8–2	6–2	3rd	
1981	Moorhead State	10–1–1	6–0	1st	L NAIA Division I Quarterfinal
1982	Moorhead State	7–2–1	5–0–1	1st	L NAIA Division I Quarterfinal
1983	Moorhead State	6–3	4–2	T–2nd	
1984	Moorhead State	8–3	5–1	T–1st	L NAIA Division I Quarterfinal
1985	Moorhead State	8–2	5–1	2nd	
1986	Moorhead State	6–5	2–4	T–5th	
1987	Moorhead State	9–3	4–2	T–3rd	
1988	Moorhead State	9–3	6–0	1st	L NAIA Division I Quarterfinal
1989	Moorhead State	6–4	5–1	1st	L NAIA Division I Quarterfinal
1990	Moorhead State	5–5	3–3	4th	
1991	Moorhead State	10–2	5–0	1st	L NAIA Division I Semifinal
1992	Moorhead State	4–5	3–3	4th	
Moorhead State:		152–80–4	102–43–1		
Total:		152–80–4			
National championship Conference title Conference division title or championship game berth
