= 1951 Carroll Fighting Saints football team =

American college football season

1951 Carroll Fighting Saints football

MCC champion
- Conference: Montana Collegiate Conference
- Record: 6–1–1 (4–0 MCC)
- Head coach: John Gagliardi (3rd season)
- Home stadium: Vigilante Stadium

1951 Montana Collegiate Conference football standings
	Conf.					Overall
Team	W		L		T	W		L		T
Carroll (MT) $	4	–	0	–	0	6	–	1	–	1
Rocky Mountain	3	–	1	–	0	?	–	?	–	?
Western Montana	2	–	2	–	0	?	–	?	–	?
Eastern Montana	1	–	3	–	0	2	–	3	–	0
Montana Mines	0	–	4	–	0	?	–	?	–	?
$ – Conference champion

The 1951 Carroll Fighting Saints football team represented Carroll College as a member of the Montana Collegiate Conference (MCC) during the 1951 college football season. In their third season under head coach John Gagliardi, the Fighting Saints compiled an overall record of 6–1–1 with a mark of 4–0 in conference play, winning the MCC title. Carroll played home games at Vigilante Stadium in Helena, Montana.

== Schedule ==
Date	Time	Opponent	Site	Result	Attendance	Source
September 22	8:00 p.m.	Westminster (UT)*	Vigilante Stadium; Helena, MT	W 7–2		
September 29		at UBC*	UBC Stadium; Vancouver, BC	T 7–2		
October 7		at Western Montana	Dillon, MT	W 28–0		
October 12	8:00 p.m.	at Weber*	Ogden Stadium; Ogden, UT	L 0–20	1,000	
October 20		Montana Mines	Vigilante Stadium; Helena, MT	W 40–7		
October 26	8:00 p.m.	at Rocky Mountain	Daylis Stadium; Billings, MT	W 40–7		
November 4	2:00 p.m.	Eastern Montana^{†}	Vigilante Stadium; Helena, MT	W 38–0		
November 10		Ricks*	Vigilante Stadium; Helena, MT	W 32–0		
*Non-conference game; ^{†}Homecoming; All times are in Mountain time
