= 2003 Saint John's Johnnies football team =

American college football season

2003 Saint John's Johnnies football

NCAA Division III national champion MIAC champion

Stagg Bowl, W 24–6 vs. Mount Union
- Conference: Minnesota Intercollegiate Athletic Conference
- Record: 14–0 (8–0 MIAC)
- Head coach: John Gagliardi (51st season)
- Home stadium: Clemens Stadium

2003 Minnesota Intercollegiate Athletic Conference football standings
| | Conf. | | | | | Overall |
| Team | W | | L | | T | W | | L | | T |
|---|---|---|---|---|---|---|---|---|---|---|
| No. 1 Saint John's (MN) $^ | 8 | – | 0 | – | 0 | 14 | – | 0 | – | 0 |
| No. 12 Bethel (MN) ^ | 7 | – | 1 | – | 0 | 9 | – | 2 | – | 0 |
| Concordia–Moorhead | 6 | – | 2 | – | 0 | 7 | – | 3 | – | 0 |
| Augsburg | 4 | – | 4 | – | 0 | 5 | – | 5 | – | 0 |
| Gustavus Adolphus | 4 | – | 4 | – | 0 | 4 | – | 6 | – | 0 |
| St. Olaf | 3 | – | 5 | – | 0 | 4 | – | 6 | – | 0 |
| St. Thomas (MN) | 3 | – | 5 | – | 0 | 3 | – | 7 | – | 0 |
| Carleton | 1 | – | 7 | – | 0 | 3 | – | 7 | – | 0 |
| Hamline | 0 | – | 8 | – | 0 | 2 | – | 8 | – | 0 |
$ – Conference champion; ^ – NCAA Division III playoff participant; Rankings from D3football.com

The 2003 Saint John's Johnnies football team represented Saint John's University as a member of the Minnesota Intercollegiate Athletic Conference (MIAC) during the 2003 NCAA Division III football season. In their 51st season under head coach John Gagliardi, the Johnnies compiled a 14–0 record and won the NCAA Division III championship.

The team played its home games at Clemens Stadium in Collegeville, Minnesota.

== Schedule ==
| Date | Opponent | Site | Result | Attendance | Source |
|---|---|---|---|---|---|
| September 13 | at Hamline | Griffin Stadium; St. Paul, MN | W 74–7 | 1,567 | |
| September 20 | UW-Eau Claire | Clemens Stadium; Collegeville, MN | W 24–10 | 7,425 | |
| September 27 | at St. Olaf | Northfield, MN | W 45–6 | 5,000 | |
| October 4 | Gustavus Adolphus | Clemens Stadium; Collegeville, MN | W 35–13 | 9,091 | |
| October 11 | at Carleton | Laird Stadium; Northfield, MN | W 44–0 | 550 | |
| October 18 | Augsburg | Clemens Stadium; Collegeville, MN | W 69–9 | 9,217 | |
| October 25 | Concordia | Clemens Stadium; Collegeville, MN | W 24–12 | 7,053 | |
| November 1 | at St. Thomas | O'Shaughnessy Stadium; St. Paul, MN | W 15–12 | 7,300 | |
| November 8 | Bethel | Clemens Stadium; Collegeville, MN | W 29–26 | 13,107 | |
| November 15 | Crown | Clemens Stadium; Collegeville, MN | W 50–0 | 4,250 | |
| November 29 | St. Norbert | Clemens Stadium; Collegeville, MN (NCAA Division III second round) | W 38–13 | 2,600 | |
| December 6 | Linfield | Clemens Stadium; Collegeville, MN (NCAA Division III quarterfinal) | W 31–25 | 2,830 | |
| December 13 | RPI | Clemens Stadium; Collegeville, MN (NCAA Division III semifinal) | W 38–10 | 2,892 | |
| December 20 | vs. Mount Union | Salem Football Stadium; Salem, VA (Stagg Bowl) | W 24–6 | 5,073 | |

== Roster ==
1 Andy Humann Fr. DB 6-0 160 Monticello, Minn. / Monticello
1 Brandon Keller Jr. K 5-7 185 Bismarck, N.D. / St. Mary's Central
2 Blake Elliott Sr. WR 6-2 215 Melrose, Minn. / Melrose
3 Casey Haugen Fr. WR 5-9 170 St. Cloud, Minn. / Apollo
3 Mike Vigoren Jr. DB 6-2 190 Sartell, Minn. / Sartell
4 Mike Burtzel Fr. DB 5-11 170 Cold Spring, Minn. / Rocori
4 Isaac Flenner Jr. TE 6-2 212 Breckenridge, Minn. / Breckenridge
5 Dana Schleicher Sr. QB 5-11 210 Waite Park, Minn. / St. Cloud Apollo
5 Mike Zauhar So. DB 6-0 170 Brainerd, Minn. / Brainerd
6 Cole Deibele Sr. DB 6-0 175 Sleepy Eye, Minn. / Sleepy Eye
6 Drew Slagle Fr. QB 6-2 165 River Forest, Ill.
7 Ryan Keating Sr. QB 5-11 195 Minnetonka, Minn. / Minnetonka
8 Jamie Steffensmeier Fr. LB 6-0 217 Mankato, Minn. / East
8 Zach Vertin Jr. QB 6-4 190 Breckenridge, Minn. / Breckenridge
9 Charlie Carr Sr. P 6-1 182 St. Cloud, Minn. / Apollo
9 Brandon Royce-Diop Fr. QB 6-1 185 Minneapolis, Minn. / De La Salle
10 Chase Beaudry So. RB 5-8 180 Elk River, Minn. / Elk River
10 Jonathan Casper So. DB 5-10 160 Wahpeton, N.D. / Wahpeton
11 Jordy Ruff Jr. QB 6-1 180 Wayzata, Minn. / Wayzata
11 Tom Wentzell Fr. DB 6-0 180 St. Paul, Minn. / Irondale
12 Adam Frie Fr. DB 6-0 190 Cold Spring, Minn. / Rocori
12 R.J. Welsh Sr. QB 6-0 170 Mendota Heights, Minn.
13 Tannon Dvorak So. RB 5-8 180 Atkinson, Neb. / West Holt
13 Jake Witherbee So. SS 5-7 166 Annandale, Minn. / Annandale
14 Ryan Collins Fr. QB 6-2 190 Kasson, Minn. / Kasson-Mantorville
14 Mark Hawn Jr. DB 6-2 180 Eau Claire, Wis. / Regis
15 Jeremy Goltz Sr. DB 6-2 185 Tracy, Minn. / Tracy-Milroy
16 Danno Wagner So. LB 6-1 185 Hastings, Minn. / Hastings
16 Charlie Welsh Fr. QB 6-2 170 Mendota Heights, Minn. / St. Thomas Academy
17 Matt Mogenson Fr. QB 6-4 185 St. Peter, Minn. / St. Peter
17 Shawn Schoenberg Fr. DB 6-0 180 Melrose, Minn. / Melrose
18 Sam Benfante Fr. DB 5-10 180 Rosemount, Minn. / Rosemount
18 Lee Clintsman Jr. WR 5-11 170 Maplewood, Minn. / Hill-Murray
18 Nicholas Winscher Jr. LB 6-1 215 Sartell, Minn. / Sartell
19 Jeremy Hood Sr. LB 6-3 215 Buffalo, Minn. / Monticello
20 Brandon Hoskins Fr. WR 6-3 195 Billings, Mont.
20 Scott LaVoy So. DB 6-1 190 Tracy, Minn. / Tracy-Milroy-Balaton
21 Paul Rieland Fr. RB 5-8 180 Melrose, Minn. / Melrose
21 Nick Thielman Sr. DB 5-11 175 St. Cloud, Minn. / Tech
22 Matt Breen Jr. RB 5-8 165 Willmar, Minn. / Willmar
22 Jason Prostrollo Fr. DB 5-7 170 Rosemount, Minn. / Rosemount
23 Eric Delzoppo Fr. K 5-11 172 Alexandria, Minn. / Alexandria
23 Jordan Wolf Fr. DB 6-1 185 Sauk Centre, Minn. / Sauk Centre
24 Ryan Blumhoefer Fr. WR 6-2 160 Fairfax, Minn. / Gibbon-Fairfax-Winthrop
24 Steve Scott Jr. DB 6-0 160 Red Wing, Minn. / Red Wing
25 Christian McPherson Fr. WR 6-2 190 Billings, Mont.
25 Tony Steffensmeier So. RB 5-9 175 Mankato, Minn. / East
26 Joel Paulson Sr. TE 6-1 200 Mora, Minn. / Mora
27 Jake Theis So. RB 6-0 187 Shakopee, Minn. / Shakopee
27 Tom Vierkant Jr. LB 6-2 180 Detroit Lakes, Minn. / Detroit Lakes
28 Jerry D'Alessandro Fr. K 5-7 165 Maple Grove, Minn. / Osseo
28 Dan Pease Fr. DB 6-0 185 Plymouth, Minn. / Wayzata
29 Dave Blomdahl So. DB 5-9 165 Mora, Minn. / Mora
29 Charles Hollenback Jr. TE 6-3 235 Anoka, Minn. / Anoka
30 Michael Klobes Jr. WR 5-8 160 Scappoose, Ore.
30 Matt Quinn Fr. DB 6-1 175 Maplewood, Minn. / North
31 Sam Koelbl Fr. DB 6-0 185 La Crosse, Wis. / Aquinas
31 Justin Winkels Jr. RB 6-1 180 Canby, Minn. / Canby
32 Josh Nelson Sr. RB 6-1 210 Milaca, Minn. / Milaca
32 Joe Neznik So. LB 6-0 195 Pequot Lakes, Minn. / Pequot Lakes
33 Paul Gans Jr. LB 6-0 195 Rice, Minn. / Sauk Rapids-Rice
34 Luke Furda Fr. RB 5-8 160 Brainerd, Minn. / Brainerd
34 Kevin McNamara Fr. DL 5-11 205 Mahtomedi, Minn. / Mahtomedi
35 Jeff Snegosky So. SS 6-0 175 New Hope, Minn. / Totino-Grace
35 David Soma Sr. RB 6-1 185 Woodbury, Minn. / Woodbury
36 Nathan Brever Sr. LB 6-3 205 St. Anthony / St. Anthony Village
36 Phil Kirsch Fr. RB 6-0 180 Kasson, Minn. / Kasson-Mantorville
37 Cameron McCambridge Sr. LB 6-2 220 Edina, Minn. / Edina
38 Reid Craigmile Fr. DB 5-10 170 Alexandria, Minn. / Alexandria
38 Justin Tucker Jr. RB 5-9 235 Eden Prairie, Minn. / Eden Prairie
39 Mark Reiner Jr. LB 6-0 200 Kensington, Minn. / West Central Area
39 Jed Riegelman Sr. WR 6-4 205 Red Wing, Minn. / Red Wing
41 Brian Adamek So. LB 5-11 195 Inver Grove Heights, Minn. / Rosemount
41 Mike Lofboom Fr. RB 6-0 185 Stillwater, Minn. / Mahtomedi
42 Matt Hawn So. LB 6-1 190 Eau Claire, Wis. / Regis
42 Jake Malone Fr. DB 5-8 160 New York Mills, Minn. / New York Mills
42 Luke Schumer Jr. TE 6-3 215 St. Stephen, Minn. / St. Cloud Cathedral
43 James Lehner Jr. RB 5-9 170 Albany, Minn. / Albany
43 Nicholas Winscher Jr. LB 6-1 215 Sartell, Minn. / Sartell
44 Steve LeVoir Fr. DL 6-1 230 Eden Prairie, Minn. / Eden Prairie
44 Dan Murphy Jr. WR 5-8 160 Henderson, Minn. / Le Sueur-Henderson
45 Aaron Babb So. FB 5-11 200 Sioux Falls, S.D. / O'Gorman
45 Mike Scharenbroich So. LB 6-1 205 Hopkins, Minn. / Hopkins
46 Gary Auer Jr. LB 5-10 200 Avon, Minn. / Holdingford
46 Mike Martin Fr. RB 5-4 150 Naperville, Ill.
47 Adam Demarais Fr. RB 5-10 190 Foley, Minn. / Foley
47 Paul Schreiner Sr. LB 6-3 200 Watkins, Minn. / Rocori
48 Jay Dunne Fr. RB 5-9 200 West Dundee, Ill. / St. Viator's
48 Kurt Kipka Fr. DB 6-0 190 Becker, Minn. / Becker
49 Zane Breithaupt So. LB 5-11 220 Traverse City, Mich.
49 Jared DeBoer So. LB 6-2 185 Milaca, Minn. / Milaca
50 Steve Peichel So. LB 6-3 210 Fairfax, Minn. / Fairfax/Gibbon-Fairfax-Winthrop
50 Jeff Soukup Jr. OL 6-1 230 Chanhassen, Minn. / Minnetonka
51 Steven Henle So. OL 6-4 260 New Ulm, Minn. / New Ulm
51 Aaron Schwartz Fr. LB 6-2 190 Cold Spring, Minn. / Rocori
52 Brian Smith Jr. OL 6-2 229 White Bear Lake, Minn. / St. Thomas Academy
53 Jason Primus So. OL 6-2 245 Melrose, Minn. / Melrose
54 Chris Feneis So. OL 6-0 220 Sartell, Minn. / Sartell
54 Ed Henry So. DT 6-3 250 St. Cloud, Minn. / Tech
55 Jim Diley Jr. OL 6-1 268 Edina, Minn. / Edina
56 Jason Blonigen Sr. OL 6-5 295 Freeport, Minn. / Melrose
56 Jason Hardie So. LB 6-2 205 Beresford, S.D. / Beresford
57 Matt Nelson So. OL 6-4 240 St. Cloud, Minn. / Apollo
57 Pete Steele Fr. LB 5-10 190 Becker, Minn. / Becker
58 Erik Brost So. OL 6-4 245 Maple Grove, Minn. / Maple Grove
58 Justin Walsh Fr. LB 6-1 220 Alexandria, Minn. / Alexandria
59 Nick Frost Fr. LB 6-0 215 Buffalo, Minn. / Buffalo
59 Jacob Zacher So. C 6-2 210 Alexandria, Minn. / Alexandria
60 Andy Elias So. DL 5-10 260 Cloquet, Minn. / Cloquet
60 Matt Hagen Sr. OL 6-0 243 Farmington, Minn. / Farmington
61 Brad Gustafson Fr. LB 6-1 195 Virginia, Minn. / Virginia
61 Jason Pfeilsticker So. DE 6-4 230 Wabasha, Minn. / Wabasha-Kellogg
62 Jeff Caldwell Fr. LB 6-0 205 Eagan, Minn. / Eagan
62 Charles O'Donnell So. OL 6-5 300 Baltimore, Md. / Loyola-Blakefield
63 Dana Kinsella Fr. OL 6-1 230 Sioux Falls, S.D. / O'Gorman
63 Josef Williams Fr. LB 6-0 180 Rochester, Minn. / Mayo
64 Mike Edgar So. LB 5-11 170 Floodwood, Minn. / Floodwood
64 Brian Mathiasen So. OL 6-1 263 St. Cloud, Minn. / Cathedral
65 Dan Philp Fr. LB 6-2 190 Waconia, Minn. / Waconia
65 Greg Trobec Fr. OL 5-9 225 Sartell, Minn. / Sartell
66 John Kaczorek Jr. OL 6-2 240 Mahtomedi, Minn. / Mahtomedi
66 Martin Morud So. LB 5-11 180 Bemidji, Minn. / Bemidji
67 Chris Tift Fr. DL 6-2 225 Sauk Rapids, Minn. / Sauk Rapids
67 Kyle Wirth Sr. OL 6-3 225 Shoreview, Minn. / Totino Grace
68 Rick Dold Fr. OL 6-0 330 Wanda, Minn. / Wabasso
68 Josh Rounds Fr. LB 6-1 190 Plymouth, Minn. / Wayzata
69 Joe Aronson Jr. OL 6-2 267 Minneapolis, Minn. / Holy Angels
69 Paul Menard Fr. LB 6-1 215 St. Paul, Minn. / Central
70 Jeremy Mohr Sr. OL 6-3 245 Morris, Minn. / Morris
70 Josh Pope So. DL 6-2 233 Mankato, Minn. / East
71 William Jimenez Fr. DL 5-10 260 Trinidad, Colo. / Catholic
71 Brett Moening Fr. OL 6-2 245 Melrose, Minn. / Melrose
71 Luke Schumacher So. OL 6-1 265 Arden Hills, Minn. / Totino-Grace
72 Dave Macalena Sr. OL 5-11 250 Buffalo, Minn. / Buffalo
73 Sean Conner Sr. OL 6-3 200 West Lebanon, N.H.
74 David Nolan So. OL 6-5 290 Monticello, Minn. / Monticello
75 Ryan Petz Jr. OL 6-5 275 Hovland, Minn. / Cook County
76 Brian Tripp Fr. OL 6-4 250 Lakeville, Minn. / Lakeville
77 Tim Kelly Fr. OL 6-2 226 Chanhassen, Minn. / Eden Prairie
77 Ryan Weinandt Sr. DL 6-0 245 Wabasha, Minn. / Wabasha Kellogg
78 Eric Hanson Sr. OL 6-3 330 Elk River, Minn. / Elk River
79 Justin Cass Sr. OL 6-0 280 Eden Prairie, Minn. / Eden Prairie
80 Mike Foley Fr. WR 6-6 205 Eagan, Minn. / Eagan
81 Drew Krueger Jr. WR 6-3 180 Wayzata, Minn. / Orono
81 Kendrick Williams Fr. DL 6-2 200 Hinckley, Minn. / Hinckley-Finlayson
82 Steve Angell Sr. K 6-2 175 Arden Hills, Minn. / Totino-Grace
82 Phil Giesen Fr. WR 6-0 210 Hayden, Idaho / Coeur d'Alene
83 Adam Minnich So. WR 6-2 175 Dayton, Minn. / Champlin Park
85 Sean Fahnhorst So. LB 6-0 180 Bloomington, Minn. / Jefferson
85 Zach Reif Fr. K 6-5 175 St. Cloud, Minn. / Rocori
86 Tony Berendes So. WR 6-1 180 Maple Grove, Minn. / Totino-Grace
87 Travis Tomford Fr. WR 5-7 163 Melrose, Minn. / Melrose
88 Adam Barvels Fr. DL 6-4 215 Lake Lillian, Minn.
88 Eric Reiner So. TE 6-1 205 Alexandria, Minn. / West Central
89 JJ Seggelke So. WR 6-2 180 Broomfield, Colo.
90 Tom Bruns Fr. DL 6-1 210 Redwood Falls, Minn. / Redwood Valley
90 Erik Hokenstad Fr. TE 6-3 235 Bismarck, N.D. / Bismarck
91 Chris Cunningham So. DL 6-2 230 Germantown, Md. / Germantown
91 Kevin Karel Fr. WR 6-5 180 Shoreview, Minn. / Mounds View
92 Sean Fahnhorst So. TE 6-0 185 Bloomington, Minn. / Jefferson
92 Mathew Wachlarowicz So. DE 6-1 215 Silver Lake, Minn. / Glencoe-Silver Lake
93 Scott Karel Fr. WR 6-5 185 Shoreview, Minn. / Mounds View
93 Jonathan Lockhart Jr. DL 6-3 240 Apple Valley, Minn. / Eastview
94 Matt Darling Sr. DL 6-1 235 Sartell, Minn. / Sartell
94 Matt de Leon So. WR 5-9 175 Stillwater, Minn. / Stillwater
95 Guy Bellair Sr. DL 6-1 225 Lubbock, Texas
96 Steve Danielson Jr. DE 6-3 215 Fargo, N.D. / Shanley
97 Damien Dumonceaux So. DL 6-1 225 St. Joseph, Minn. / Saint John's Prep
98 Joe Thomas So. LB 6-3 220 Chicago, Ill. / Loyola Academy
99 Dave Dirkswager So. DL 6-3 230 Eden Prairie, Minn. / Eden Prairie
99 Sam Pearson So. TE 6-3 220 Cambridge, Minn. / Cambridge
