= Amanda Smock =

American triple jumper

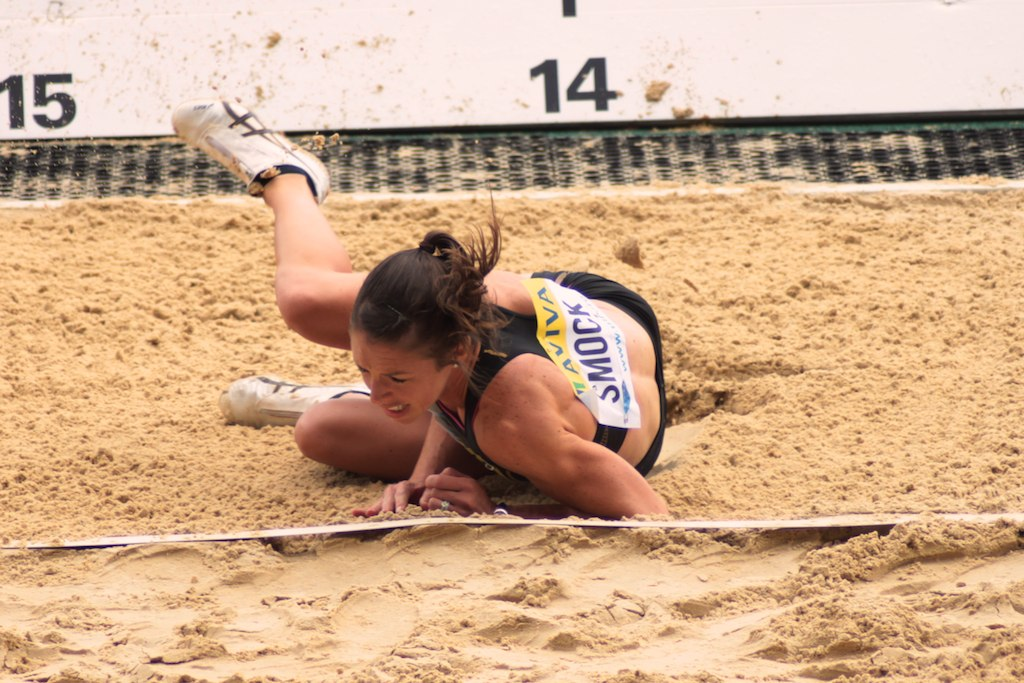
- Smock at the 2012 London Grand Prix

Personal information
- Nationality: American
- Born: July 27, 1982 (age 43)
- Home town: Minneapolis, Minnesota, U.S.
- Agent: Jeff Hartwig
- Height: 5 ft 7 in (170 cm)
- Weight: 131 lb (59 kg)

Sport
- Sport: Track and field
- Event: Triple jump
- Club: New York Athletic Club (NYAC)
- Coached by: Jeremy Fischer

Achievements and titles
- Personal best: Triple jump: 14.18m

Amanda Smock (née Thieschafer, born July 27, 1982) is an American triple jumper who competed at the 2012 Summer Olympics. In college, she was a three-time NCAA Division II track and field champion. She won the triple jump events at the United States Outdoor Championships in 2011 and 2012, and at the Indoor Championships in 2011.

== Early life ==
Smock was born Amanda Thieschafer on July 27, 1982, to parents Beth and Glen Thieschafer. She grew up in a small town in rural Minnesota - Melrose, Minnesota, where she began competing in gymnastics at age 4. "There was this movie called Nadia after Nadia Comăneci, and I must have watched that thing 1,000 times," Smock later remarked. "I definitely was going to be an Olympic gymnast." Although her father was a gymnastics coach, eventually she realized she was better suited for track and field, giving up on gymnastics as a teenager. In high school, she excelled at long jump, pole vault, triple jump, and sprinting events. Smock graduated from Melrose High School in 2000. She attended North Dakota State University for college on an athletic scholarship, graduating in 2004. In college, she was a three-time NCAA Division II triple jump champion.

== Athletic career ==
Smock qualified for the 2008 Olympic Track and Field Trials, but finished fifth and failed to make the Olympic team. After the meet, her father took his credential and replaced the "2008" with "2012." He died shortly after the Trials, but Smock placed the credential where she would see it daily as a form of motivation.

In 2011, Smock placed first in the triple jump at the USA Outdoor Track and Field Championships with a jump of 14.07 metres (46.2 ft). However, her jump was just short of the B standard needed to participate in the World Championships. A few days before the American team was announced, she jumped a new personal best of 14.18 metres (46.5 ft), allowing her to compete at Worlds. She failed to make the final at the World Championships, finishing 31st of 34 competitors. At the 2011 Indoor Championships, she finished second in the triple jump with a distance of 13.63 metres (44.7 ft).

In 2012, she won the indoor championship with a distance of 13.77 metres (45.2 ft), qualifying her for the 2012 IAAF World Indoor Championships. At Worlds, she finished 26th of 30 competitors. At the Olympic Trials, which also served as the National Championships, she won the event with a jump of 13.94 metres (45.7 ft) and qualified for the 2012 Summer Olympics in London. At the games, she failed to advance out of the qualifying round of competition. Her best of three attempts was 13.61 metres (44.7 ft), well short of the 14.4 metres (47 ft) necessary to advance. Of her performance, she remarked "To be here at the Olympic Games is awesome, and I think with each passing year this is going to mean more and more, and the performance will kind of fade away." She was the lone female triple jump representative for the United States at the games. Smock said she would continue to compete for another year at least, but said it was unlikely she would try for another Olympics.

In 2014, Smock won the 2014 USA Indoor Track and Field Championships Triple Jump in 13.81 m (45 ft 31/2 in) but failed to qualify to the 2014 IAAF World Indoor Championships – Women's triple jump. However, in 2015, she again took the indoor national title in the women's triple jump for the fourth consecutive season, beating her own personal best with a jump of 43.58 feet (13.28 m). Amanda finished 5th with a jump of 13.77 metres (45.2 ft) in triple jump at 2015 USA Outdoor Track and Field Championships

== Personal life ==
Amanda Smock has been married to former college teammate Greg Smock since 2009. She is part of the New York Athletic Club Track Team and is sponsored by Asics. Amanda has worked as a partner at a small business specializing in corporate wellness programs. She considers herself blessed to not have to try to balance work and training. She celebrated her 30th birthday on July 27, the opening day of the Olympic Games in 2012.

Smock is also a coach for Macalester College's track and field team, coaching long jump and triple jump.
