= Melrose High School (Minnesota) =

Location
- 546 5th Ave NE, Melrose, Minnesota; 56352; United States
- Coordinates: 45.6818°N 94.8059°W

Information
- Type: Public
- Established: 1970
- School district: 740
- Principal: Chad Doetkott
- Staff: 28.68 (FTE)
- Grades: 9–12
- Student to teacher ratio: 17.57
- Color
- Athletics conference: West Central Conference
- Mascot: Dutchmen

Melrose High School is a high school at 546 5th Ave NE, Melrose, Minnesota, United States.

== Notable alumni ==
- Blake Elliott - Winner of the 2003 Gagliardi Trophy for academic and football excellence.
- Matt Herkenhoff - Former professional football player.
- Mark Olberding - Former professional basketball player.
- Mitch Clem - Cartoonist, Creator of Nothing Nice to Say.
- Amanda Smock - competed in the 2012 Summer Olympics as an American Triple Jumper; she grew up in Melrose.
- Alan Welle - Minnesota state legislator and lawyer
