= Saint John's Johnnies football =

| 2026 Saint John's Johnnies football team |
- First season: 1900; 126 years ago
- Athletic director: Dan O’Brien
- Head coach: Gary Fasching; 16th season, 110–20 (.846)
- Location: Collegeville, Minnesota
- Stadium: Clemens Stadium (capacity: 8,500)
- Conference: MIAC
- Colors: Red and blue
- All-time record: 681–257–24 (.720)

NCAA Division III championships
- 1976, 2003

NAIA national championships
- 1963, 1965

Conference championships
- 35
- Consensus All-Americans: 144
- Rivalries: St. Thomas (MN) (former)
- Mascot: Johnnies
- Website: gojohnnies.com

The Saint John's Johnnies football program represents Saint John's University in Collegeville, Minnesota. They compete at the NCAA Division III level and are members of the Minnesota Intercollegiate Athletic Conference (MIAC). From 1953 through November 19, 2012, collegiate hall-of-fame coach John Gagliardi coached the Johnnies, posting a 489–138–11 (.775) record over 59 years. Gagliardi's 489 wins are the most all-time for any football coach across all divisions. Before John Gagliardi, Johnny Blood coached for Saint John's. Blood stated while leaving the head coaching job that, "nobody can win at Saint John's." Gagliardi and the Johnnies went 6-2 the following season in 1953. The current coach is Gary Fasching, who was named to the position on December 28, 2012.

The Johnnies have the second highest win percentage football program in Division III history, boasting a 692–257–24 (.724) record during 2024 season.

== Championships ==
=== National championships ===
| Year | Association | Division | Head coach | Record | Opponent | Result |
|---|---|---|---|---|---|---|
| 1963 | NAIA (2) | Single (2) | John Gagliardi | 10–0 (7–0 MIAC) | Prairie View A&M | W, 33–27 |
| 1965 | NAIA (2) | Single (2) | John Gagliardi | 11–0 (7–0 MIAC) | Linfield | W, 33–0 |
| 1976 | NCAA (2) | Division III (2) | John Gagliardi | 10–0–1 (7–0 MIAC) | Towson State | W, 31–28 |
| 2003 | NCAA (2) | Division III (2) | John Gagliardi | 14–0 (8–0 MIAC) | Mount Union | W, 24–6 |

== Postseason appearances ==
=== NCAA Division III playoffs ===
The Johnnies have made thirty-one appearances in the NCAA Division III playoffs, with a combined record of 45–28. They finished as national champions in the NCAA Division III Championship Game (Stagg Bowl) in 1976 and 2003, and as national runner-ups in 2000.

| Year | Round | Opponent | Result |
|---|---|---|---|
| 1976 | First Round; Semifinals; Stagg Bowl | Augustana (IL); Buena Vista; Towson State | W, 46–7; W, 61–0; W, 31–28 |
| 1977 | First Round | Wabash | L, 9–20 |
| 1985 | First Round | Occidental | L, 10–28 |
| 1987 | First Round; Quarterfinals | Gustavus Adolphus; Central (IA) | W, 7–3; L, 3–13 |
| 1989 | First Round; Quarterfinals; Semifinals | Simpson (IA); Central (IA); Dayton | W, 42–35; W, 27–24; L, 0–28 |
| 1991 | First Round; Quarterfinals; Semifinals | Coe; Wisconsin–La Crosse; Dayton | W, 75–2; W, 29–10; L, 7–19 |
| 1993 | First Round; Quarterfinals | Coe; Wisconsin–La Crosse | W, 32–14; L, 25–47 |
| 1994 | First Round; Quarterfinals; Semifinals | La Verne; Wartburg; Albion | W, 51–12; W, 24–14; L, 16–19 |
| 1996 | First Round; Quarterfinals | Simpson (IA); Wisconsin–La Crosse | W, 21–18; L, 30–37 |
| 1998 | First Round; Quarterfinals | Pacific Lutheran; Wisconsin–Eau Claire | W, 33–20; L, 3–10 |
| 1999 | First Round; Second Round; Quarterfinals | Wisconsin–Stevens Point; Central (IA); Pacific Lutheran | W, 23–10; W, 10–9; L, 9–19 |
| 2000 | First Round; Second Round; Quarterfinals; Semifinals; Stagg Bowl | Wisconsin–Stout; Pacific Lutheran; Central (IA); Hardin–Simmons; Mount Union | W, 26–19; W, 28–21 ^{OT} W, 21–18; W, 38–14; L, 7–10 |
| 2001 | First Round; Second Round; Quarterfinals; Semifinals | St. Norbert; Wisconsin–Stevens Point; Pacific Lutheran; Mount Union | W, 27–20; W, 9–7; W, 31–6; L, 14–35 |
| 2002 | First Round; Second Round; Quarterfinals; Semifinals | Redlands; Coe; Linfield; Trinity (TX) | W, 31–24; W, 45–14; W, 21–14; L, 34–41 |
| 2003 | Second Round; Quarterfinals; Semifinals; Stagg Bowl | St. Norbert; Linfield; RPI; Mount Union | W, 38–13; W, 31–25; W, 38–10; W, 24–6 |
| 2005 | First Round; Second Round | Monmouth (IL); Wisconsin–Whitewater | W, 62–3; L, 7–34 |
| 2006 | First Round; Second Round; Quarterfinals | Central (IA); Whitworth; Wisconsin–Whitewater | W, 21–13; W, 21–3; L, 14–17 |
| 2007 | First Round; Second Round | Redlands; Central (IA) | W, 41–13; L, 7–37 |
| 2008 | First Round | Wisconsin–Whitewater | L, 7–37 |
| 2009 | First Round | Coe | L, 27–34 |
| 2014 | First Round; Second Round | St. Scholastica; Wartburg | W, 35–7; L, 10–21 |
| 2015 | First Round; Second Round | Dubuque; St. Thomas (MN) | W, 51–7; L, 19–38 |
| 2016 | First Round; Second Round | Wisconsin–Platteville; Wisconsin–Oshkosh | W, 32–31; L, 14–31 |
| 2017 | First Round | North Central (IL) | L, 7–17 |
| 2018 | First Round; Second Round; Quarterfinals | Martin Luther; Whitworth; Mary Hardin–Baylor | W, 84–6; W, 45–24; L, 18–21 |
| 2019 | First Round; Second Round; Quarterfinals; Semifinals | Aurora; Chapman; Wheaton (IL); Wisconsin–Whitewater | W, 51–47; W, 55–26; W, 34–33; L, 32–35 |
| 2021 | First Round; Second Round | Lake Forest; Linfield | W, 41–14; L, 28–31 |
| 2022 | First Round; Second Round | Northwestern (MN); Wartburg | W, 49–0; L, 20–23 |
| 2024 | Second Round; Third Round | Wisconsin–La Crosse; Susquehanna | W, 24–13; L, 38–41 |
| 2025 | Second Round; Third Round | Monmouth (IL); Wisconsin–River Falls | W, 49–15; L, 14–42 |
| 2026 | Second Round | Hanover | TBP |

=== NAIA playoffs ===
The Johnnies made three appearances in the NAIA playoffs and won the NAIA national championship twice, with a combined record of 4–1.

| Year | Round | Opponent | Result |
|---|---|---|---|
| 1963 | Semifinals; Camellia Bowl | College of Emporia; Prairie View A&M | W, 24–13; W, 33–27 |
| 1965 | Semifinals; Championship | Fairmont State; Linfield | W, 28–7; W, 33–0 |
| 1982 | Quarterfinals | Northwestern (IA) | L, 28–33 |

== Players drafted into the NFL ==
| Year | Round | Pick | Player | Position | NFL club |
| 1949 | 12 | 113 | Red Maenhout | End | New York Bulldogs |
| 1955 | 19 | 218 | Dick Coy | T | Chicago Cardinals |
| 1957 | 19 | 222 | Chuck Froehle | G | Baltimore Colts |
| 1963 | 18 | 240 | Tom McIntyre | OT | Minnesota Vikings |
| 1964 | 9 | 125 | John McDowell | OT | Green Bay Packers |
| 1965 | 16 | 219 | Paul Labinski | DT | Minnesota Vikings |
| 1967 | 12 | 296 | Fred Cremer | G | Minnesota Vikings |
| 1972 | 12 | 304 | Steve Setzler | DE | San Francisco 49ers |
| 1974 | 15 | 389 | Kurt Wachtler | DT | Minnesota Vikings |
| 2020 | 4 | 116 | Ben Bartch | OT | Jacksonville Jaguars |
