= Clemens Stadium =

American football stadium in Minnesota

Coordinates: 45.582735°N 94.391721°W

- "The Natural Bowl"

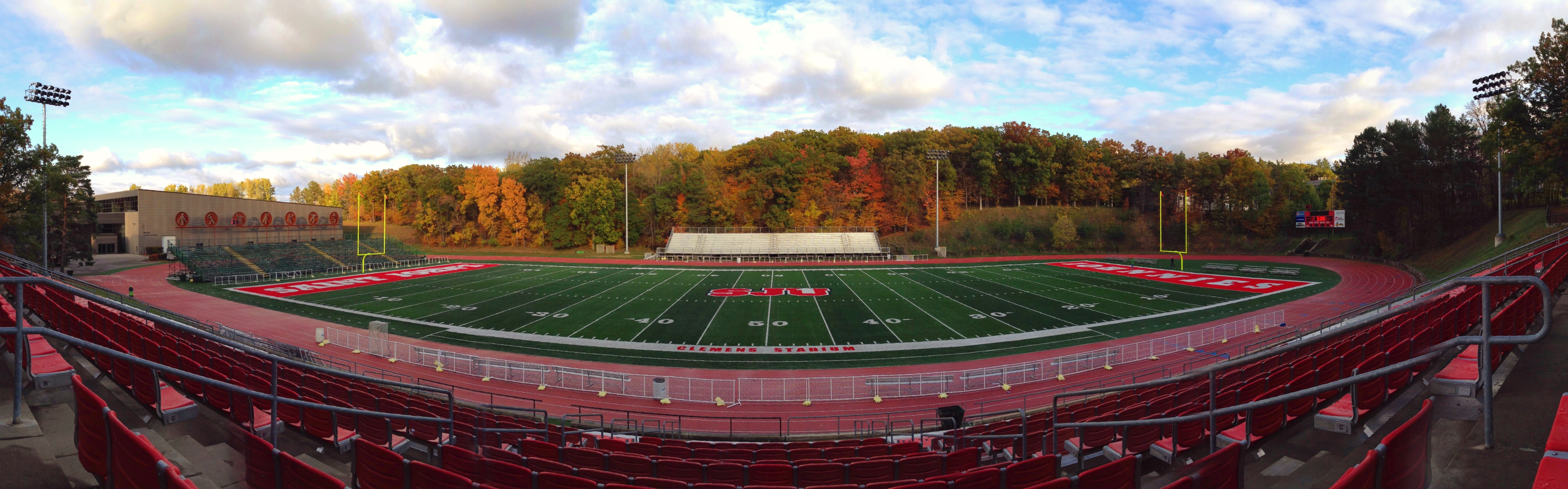
- Panoramic view of the stadium in 2013

- Location in Minnesota Location in the United States
- Former names: Saint John's Field (1908–1932); Saint John's Stadium (1933–1996
- Address: Collegeville, MN; United States
- Owner: Saint John's University
- Operator: Saint John's University
- Capacity: Official: 7,482 (since 2007)
- Type: Stadium
- Surface: SprinTurf
- Record attendance: 17,327 (vs. St. Thomas, September 26, 2015)
- Current use: Football

Construction
- Opened: 1908
- Architects: Sam Chute (1908); Ellerbe Becket (1997 renovation)

Tenants
- Saint John's University (NCAA); Saint John's Preparatory School (MSHSL)

Website
- gojohnnies.com/clemens-stadium

Clemens Stadium is a football stadium in Collegeville, Minnesota. It serves as the host stadium to Saint John's University football, track and field teams and other intramural activities. Saint John's Preparatory School's football and track and field teams also use Clemens Stadium as their home facility.

Popularly called "The Natural Bowl", Clemens Stadium was named one of ten Sports Illustrated "College Football Dream Destinations" in 1999 for its natural beauty and large crowds.

Clemens Stadium is built into a horseshoe-shaped hillside, surrounded on three sides by trees, giving the stadium its natural beauty and nickname. The hills not built over with concrete or metal stands are almost always occupied by fans who bring blankets to sit on. Because of the hillsides and other space inside the stadium, it can accommodate more spectators than the official fire code-defined seating capacity allows, up to 2½ times the official number.

== History ==
Clemens Stadium's unique, natural bowl configuration is actually the result of artificial design. The bowl was shaped by Saint John's monks who were building brick structures in the 1860s and 1870s. Clay in the soil northeast of campus was dug out of a hill and fired in a nearby kiln to produce bricks for the new Abbey Church (now Great Hall) and Quadrangle. After the buildings were completed, the chasm was filled with water and used as a cranberry bog for the monastery, university, and preparatory school.

As athletics gained popularity among colleges across the United States, Saint John's was in need of an adequate field for football. The cranberry bog was drained and in 1908 the new field was ready for football. But it was not large enough for a regulation-size football field, and in 1922 it expanded northward to alleviate the problem.

In 1933, the first concrete stands were completed. The black metal tube railing on the southwest hill remains from this original construction. Six years later, an arched stadium entrance, ticket booth, two stairways, and a circular field entrance were built using fieldstone. The circular field entrance was inspired by Syracuse's Archbold Stadium. The stairways and the southwest half of the circular field entrance remain today.

A press box was added in 1943.

After John Gagliardi took over as head coach, crowds increased and in 1957 the concrete stands were expanded to accommodate 3,000. Aside from basic field, stand, and press box upgrades, the stadium remained unchanged for 40 years.

The fieldstone stadium entrance and ticket booth were demolished to make way for the Alcuin Library and road access to a parking lot in the 1960s.

== Renovation and renaming ==
With a large gift from Saint John's alumnus William E. Clemens and his wife, Virginia, Saint John's Stadium received a significant renovation in 1997.

The southeast and southwest hills were excavated for a regulation-sized eight-lane track. The wood bleachers on the east side were replaced by new metal bleachers. A new concrete grandstand was built with both bench seats and reserved chair seats. The press box, concession stands, and restroom facilities were also reconstructed. The seating capacity grew to 5,500.

In addition to the renovations, the open north end of the horseshoe was closed off in 1997 with the addition of the McNeely Spectrum fieldhouse.

In honor of the Clemenses' gift, the stadium was renamed Clemens Stadium.

== Recent improvements ==
Since 2002, Clemens Stadium has undergone significant improvements.

=== SprinTurf ===
In 2002 the grass field was replaced with SprinTurf to cut down on chemicals and water used to maintain the grass field, and to help prevent student-athlete injuries as a result from wet and muddy fields.

=== Reserved seating ===
Reserved seating was expanded in 2003 and 2005 to accommodate almost 1,000 season ticket holders.

=== General admission bleachers ===
General admission bleachers were added to the north end zone in 2004. The bleachers were expanded again in 2007 to bring the stadium seating capacity to 7,482.

=== Press box and suites ===
The press box added a level in 2009. The addition included five new suites, two bathrooms, elevator, expanded radio, coaching, press boxes, and a "Legends Room."

=== Lights ===
The Donald McNeely Foundation donated money to add lights that were installed before the 2012 season. Saint John's has said it does not plan to host night intercollegiate games in the near future, but the lights are used for high school games, intramurals, and the school's ROTC program.

== Record crowds ==
Clemens Stadium is known for some of the largest crowds in NCAA Division III football. For 11 of the past 15 seasons, Saint John's has led Division III in either per-game average or total season attendance. The largest crowd ever for NCAA Division III football was recorded on September 26, 2015, when the Johnnies hosted 17,327 fans in a 14-35 loss to the University of Saint Thomas. On November 8, 2003, Clemens Stadium hosted a then-NCAA Division III record 13,107 fans for a game against Bethel, for John Gagliardi's record-breaking 409th career victory.

Highest attendance at Clemens Stadium
| Rank | Attendance | Date | Game result |
|---|---|---|---|
| 1 | 17,327 | Sep 26, 2015 | Saint John's 14, St. Thomas 35 |
| 2 | 16,922 | Oct. 13, 2018 | Saint John's 40, St. Thomas 20 |
| 3 | 16,421 | Oct. 2, 2010 | Saint John's 26, St. Thomas 27 |
| 4 | 14,286 | Sept. 15, 2012 | Saint John's 21, St. Thomas 43 |
| 5 | 13,161 | Oct. 22, 2022 | Saint John's 41, Gustavus 27 |
| 6 | 13,107 | Nov. 8, 2003 | Saint John's 29, Bethel 26 |
| 7 | 12,903 | Oct. 17, 2009 | Saint John's 20, St. Thomas 17 |
| 8 | 12,339 | Oct. 6, 2007 | Saint John's 30, St. Olaf 29 |
| 9 | 12,221 | Sept. 24, 2011 | Saint John's 31, Augsburg 32 |
| 10 | 12,123 | Oct. 27, 2007 | Saint John's 51, St. Thomas 34 |
