= Minnesota Intercollegiate Athletic Conference =

NCAA Division III athletic conference in Minnesota

- Association: NCAA
- Founded: March 15, 1920
- Commissioner: Dan McKane (since 2005)
- Sports fielded: 22; men's: 11; women's: 11
- Division: Division III
- No. of teams: 13
- Headquarters: Bloomington, Minnesota
- Region: Minnesota
- Website: www.miacathletics.com

Locations
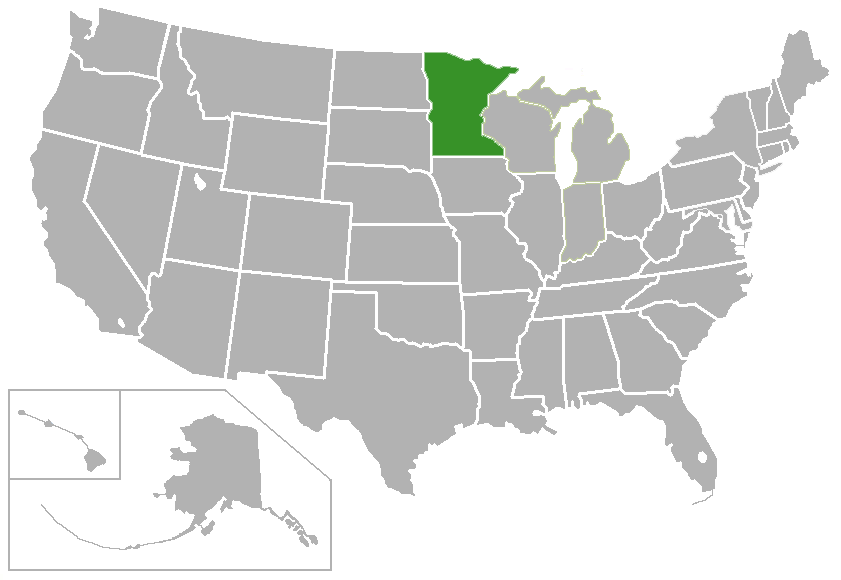

The Minnesota Intercollegiate Athletic Conference (MIAC /ˈmaɪæk/ MY-ak) is an intercollegiate athletic conference that competes in the National Collegiate Athletic Association (NCAA) Division III. All 13 of the member schools are located in Minnesota and are private institutions, with only two being non-sectarian.

== History ==
Location of MIAC schools. Current members: green. Former members: red.

On March 15, 1920, a formal constitution was adopted and the Minnesota Intercollegiate Athletic Conference with founding members Carleton College, Gustavus Adolphus College, Hamline University, Macalester College, Saint John's University, St. Olaf College, and the College of St. Thomas (now University of St. Thomas).

Concordia College joined the MIAC in 1921, Augsburg University in 1924, and Saint Mary's University in 1926. Carleton dropped membership in 1925, rejoining in 1983. St. Olaf left in 1950, returning in 1975. The University of Minnesota Duluth was a member of the MIAC from 1950 to 1975. Bethel University joined in 1978. The MIAC initiated women's competition in the 1981–82 season. Two all-women's schools subsequently joined the conference, St. Catherine University in 1983 and the College of St. Benedict in 1985.

The conference did not play sports from the fall 1943 to the spring of 1945 due to World War II. Saint Mary's discontinued its football program in 1955. Macalester football left the conference in 2002, but subsequently rejoined. St. Catherine and St. Benedict, being both women's colleges, also do not sponsor football. Together with Saint John's, one of only a handful of men's colleges, St. Benedict forms a joint academic institution, known commonly by the initialism CSB/SJU.

From 1947 to 2003 the MIAC had a strong men's wrestling program, which was discontinued following the 2002–03 season. The strongest teams over the history of the conference were Augsburg with 31 team championships, and Saint John's with 14 team championships. The MIAC teams and individual wrestlers demonstrated a strong national and Olympic presence in the 1970s and beyond.

On May 22, 2019, it was announced that the University of St. Thomas would depart the MIAC at the end of spring 2021. St. Thomas by this point had over twice the enrollment of any other member institution. and on May 28, 2020, the conference announced the addition of the College of St. Scholastica after leaving the Upper Midwest Athletic Conference in 2021.

The conference split into two divisions for football in 2021. The Northwoods Division consists of Carleton College, Gustavus Adolphus College, Saint John's University, St. Olaf College, and The College of St. Scholastica. The Skyline Division consists of Augsburg University, Bethel University, Concordia College, Hamline University, and Macalester College.

=== Chronological timeline ===
- 1920 – On March 15, 1920, the Minnesota Intercollegiate Athletic Conference (MIAC) was founded. Charter members included Carleton College, Gustavus Adolphus College, Hamline University, Macalester College, Saint John's University, St. Olaf College and the College of St. Thomas (now the University of St. Thomas), beginning the 1920–21 academic year.
- 1921 – Concordia College at Moorhead joined the MIAC in the 1921–22 academic year.
- 1924 – Augsburg Seminary (now Augsburg University) joined the MIAC in the 1924–25 academic year.
- 1925 – Carleton left the MIAC to fully align with the Midwest Collegiate Athletic Conference (MCAC) after the 1924–25 academic year.
- 1926 – Saint Mary's College (now Saint Mary's University) joined the MIAC in the 1926–27 academic year.
- 1950 – St. Olaf left the MIAC to become an Independent (who would later join the MCAC, beginning the 1952–53 school year) after the 1949–50 academic year.
- 1951 – The University of Minnesota at Duluth joined the MIAC in the 1951–52 academic year.
- 1974 – St. Olaf rejoined the MIAC in the 1974–75 academic year.
- 1975 – Minnesota–Duluth left the MIAC to join the Northern Intercollegiate Conference (NIC) after the 1974–75 academic year.
- 1977 – Bethel College and Seminary (now Bethel University) joined the MIAC in the 1977–78 academic year.
- 1982 – The MIAC became exclusively an NCAA Division III athletic conference, beginning the 1982–83 academic year; forgoing its membership in the National Association of Intercollegiate Athletics (NAIA).
- 1983 – St. Catherine University joined the MIAC (with Carleton rejoining) in the 1983–84 academic year.
- 1985 – The College of Saint Benedict joined the MIAC in the 1985–86 academic year.
- 2021:
  - St. Thomas left the MIAC to join the NCAA Division I ranks and the Summit League after the 2020–21 academic year; as the school was removed by the conference.
  - The College of St. Scholastica joined the MIAC in the 2021–22 academic year.

== Member schools ==
=== Current members ===
The MIAC currently has 13 full members, all are private schools.

| Institution | Location (Note: All cities are located within the State of Minnesota.) | Founded | Affiliation | Undergrad enrollment | Nickname | Joined (Note: Represents the calendar year when fall sports competition begins.) | Colors |
|---|---|---|---|---|---|---|---|
| Augsburg University | Minneapolis | 1869 | Lutheran (ELCA) | 2,550 | Auggies | 1924 | |
| Bethel University | Arden Hills | 1871 | Converge | 2,965 | Royals | 1977 | |
| Carleton College | Northfield | 1866 | Nonsectarian | 2,105 | Knights | 1920; 1983 (Note: Carleton left the MIAC after the 1924–25 school year, before re-joining in the 1983–84 school year.) | |
| Concordia College | Moorhead | 1891 | Lutheran (ELCA) | 2,114 | Cobbers | 1921 | |
| Gustavus Adolphus College | St. Peter | 1862 | Lutheran (ELCA) | 2,230 | Golden Gusties | 1920 | |
| Hamline University | St. Paul | 1854 | United Methodist | 2,184 | Pipers | 1920 | |
| Macalester College (Note: Macalester rejoined the MIAC in football since the 2021 fall season (2021–22 school year). It became an independent in football from the 2002 to 2013 fall seasons (2002–03 to 2013–14 school years), and then a football-only member of the Midwest Conference (MWC) from the 2014 to 2020 fall seasons (2014–15 to 2020–21 school years).) | St. Paul | 1874 | Nonsectarian | 2,146 | Scots | 1920 | |
| College of Saint Benedict (Note: Saint Benedict (women's) and Saint John's (men's) are together the College of Saint Benedict and Saint John's University and usually grouped together, but they participate separately in athletics.) (Note: This institution is a women's college, therefore it does not compete in men's sports.) | St. Joseph | 1913 | Catholic (Benedictines) | 1,958 | Bennies | 1985 | |
| St. Catherine University | St. Paul | 1905 | Catholic (CSJ) | 3,176 | Wildcats | 1983 | |
| Saint John's University (Note: This institution is a men's college, therefore it does not compete in women's sports.) | Collegeville | 1857 | Catholic (Benedictines) | 1,754 | Johnnies | 1920 | |
| Saint Mary's University | Winona | 1912 | Catholic (Lasallian) | 1,590 | Cardinals | 1926 | |
| St. Olaf College | Northfield | 1874 | Lutheran (ELCA) | 3,040 | Oles | 1920, 1974 (Note: St. Olaf left the MIAC after the 1949–50 school year, before rejoining in the 1974–75 school year.) | |
| College of St. Scholastica | Duluth | 1912 | Catholic (Benedictines) | 3,906 | Saints | 2021 | |

=== Former members ===
The MIAC had two former full members, one a public school and one a private school.

| Institution | Location (Note: All cities are located within the State of Minnesota.) | Founded | Affiliation | Enrollment | Nickname | Joined (Note: Represents the calendar year when fall sports competition begins.) | Left (Note: Represents the calendar year when spring sports competition ends.) | Current conference |
|---|---|---|---|---|---|---|---|---|
| University of Minnesota–Duluth | Duluth | 1902 | Public | 11,729 | Bulldogs | 1951 | 1975 | Northern Sun (NSIC) (Note: Currently an NCAA Division II athletic conference.) |
| University of Saint Thomas | St. Paul | 1885 | Catholic (A.S.P.M.) | 6,199 | Tommies | 1920 | 2021 | Summit (Note: Currently an NCAA Division I athletic conference.) |

=== Membership timeline ===
Full member (all sports) Full member (non-football) Associate member (football) Associate member (sport) Other conference 1 Other conference 2

== Sports ==
A divisional format is used for football.
Northwoods
- Carleton
- Gustavus Adolphus
- Saint John's
- St. Olaf
- St. Scholastica
Skyline
- Augsburg
- Bethel
- Concordia
- Hamline
- Macalester

Conference Sports

| Sport | Men's | Women's |
|---|---|---|
| Baseball | ✓ | |
| Basketball | ✓ | ✓ |
| Cross Country | ✓ | ✓ |
| Football | ✓ | |
| Golf | ✓ | ✓ |
| Ice Hockey | ✓ | ✓ |
| Soccer | ✓ | ✓ |
| Softball | | ✓ |
| Swimming & Diving | ✓ | ✓ |
| Tennis | ✓ | ✓ |
| Track & Field (Indoor) | ✓ | ✓ |
| Track & Field (Outdoor) | ✓ | ✓ |
| Volleyball | | ✓ |

=== Men's Sports ===
| School | Baseball | Basketball | Cross Country | Football | Golf | Ice Hockey | Soccer | Swimming & Diving | Tennis | Track & Field (Indoor) | Track & Field (Outdoor) | Total MIAC Sports |
|---|---|---|---|---|---|---|---|---|---|---|---|---|
| Augsburg | ✓ | ✓ | ✓ | ✓ | ✓ | ✓ | ✓ | ✗ | ✗ | ✓ | ✓ | 9 |
| Bethel | ✓ | ✓ | ✓ | ✓ | ✓ | ✓ | ✓ | ✗ | ✓ | ✓ | ✓ | 10 |
| Carleton | ✓ | ✓ | ✓ | ✓ | ✓ | ✗ | ✓ | ✓ | ✓ | ✓ | ✓ | 10 |
| Concordia | ✓ | ✓ | ✓ | ✓ | ✓ | ✓ | ✓ | ✗ | ✓ | ✓ | ✓ | 10 |
| Gustavus Adolphus | ✓ | ✓ | ✓ | ✓ | ✓ | ✓ | ✓ | ✓ | ✓ | ✓ | ✓ | 11 |
| Hamline | ✓ | ✓ | ✓ | ✓ | ✗ | ✓ | ✓ | ✓ | ✓ | ✓ | ✓ | 10 |
| Macalester | ✓ | ✓ | ✓ | ✓ | ✓ | ✗ | ✓ | ✓ | ✓ | ✓ | ✓ | 10 |
| Saint John’s | ✓ | ✓ | ✓ | ✓ | ✓ | ✓ | ✓ | ✓ | ✓ | ✓ | ✓ | 11 |
| Saint Mary’s | ✓ | ✓ | ✓ | ✗ | ✗ | ✓ | ✓ | ✗ | ✓ | ✓ | ✓ | 8 |
| St. Olaf | ✓ | ✓ | ✓ | ✓ | ✓ | ✓ | ✓ | ✓ | ✓ | ✓ | ✓ | 11 |
| St. Scholastica | ✓ | ✓ | ✓ | ✓ | ✓ | ✓ | ✓ | ✗ | ✓ | ✓ | ✓ | 10 |
| Totals | 11 | 11 | 11 | 10 | 9 | 9 | 11 | 6 | 10 | 11 | 11 | 110 |

==== Men's varsity sports not sponsored by the MIAC that are played by MIAC schools ====
| School | Alpine Skiing | Nordic Skiing | Wrestling |
|---|---|---|---|
| Augsburg | | | IND |
| Concordia | | | IND |
| Saint John's | | | IND |
| St. Olaf | USCSA | CCSA | |
| St. Scholastica | | CCSA | |

=== Women's Sports ===
| School | Basketball | Cross Country | Golf | Ice Hockey | Soccer | Softball | Swimming & Diving | Tennis | Track & Field (Indoor) | Track & Field (Outdoor) | Volleyball | Total MIAC Sports |
|---|---|---|---|---|---|---|---|---|---|---|---|---|
| Augsburg | ✓ | ✓ | ✓ | ✓ | ✓ | ✓ | ✓ | ✗ | ✓ | ✓ | ✓ | 10 |
| Bethel | ✓ | ✓ | ✓ | ✓ | ✓ | ✓ | ✗ | ✓ | ✓ | ✓ | ✓ | 10 |
| Carleton | ✓ | ✓ | ✓ | ✗ | ✓ | ✓ | ✓ | ✓ | ✓ | ✓ | ✓ | 10 |
| Concordia | ✓ | ✓ | ✓ | ✓ | ✓ | ✓ | ✓ | ✓ | ✓ | ✓ | ✓ | 11 |
| Gustavus Adolphus | ✓ | ✓ | ✓ | ✓ | ✓ | ✓ | ✓ | ✓ | ✓ | ✓ | ✓ | 11 |
| Hamline | ✓ | ✓ | ✗ | ✓ | ✓ | ✓ | ✓ | ✓ | ✓ | ✓ | ✓ | 10 |
| Macalester | ✓ | ✓ | ✓ | ✗ | ✓ | ✓ | ✓ | ✓ | ✓ | ✓ | ✓ | 10 |
| Saint Benedict | ✓ | ✓ | ✓ | ✓ | ✓ | ✓ | ✓ | ✓ | ✓ | ✓ | ✓ | 11 |
| Saint Mary’s | ✓ | ✓ | ✗ | ✓ | ✓ | ✓ | ✗ | ✓ | ✓ | ✓ | ✓ | 9 |
| St. Catherine | ✓ | ✓ | ✓ | ✓ | ✓ | ✓ | ✓ | ✓ | ✓ | ✓ | ✓ | 11 |
| St. Olaf | ✓ | ✓ | ✓ | ✓ | ✓ | ✓ | ✓ | ✓ | ✓ | ✓ | ✓ | 11 |
| St. Scholastica | ✓ | ✓ | ✓ | ✓ | ✓ | ✓ | ✗ | ✓ | ✓ | ✓ | ✓ | 10 |
| Totals | 12 | 12 | 10 | 10 | 12 | 12 | 9 | 11 | 12 | 12 | 12 | 124 |

==== Women's varsity sports not sponsored by the MIAC that are played by MIAC schools ====
| School | Alpine Skiing | Flag Football | Gymnastics | Lacrosse | Nordic Skiing | Water Polo | Wrestling |
|---|---|---|---|---|---|---|---|
| Augsburg | | | | WIAC | | | IND |
| Concordia | | ✓ | | | | | |
| Gustavus Adolphus | | | WIAC | | | | |
| Hamline | | | WIAC | WIAC | | | |
| Macalester | | | | | | CWPA | |
| Saint Benedict | | ✓ | | WIAC | | | |
| St. Catherine | | ✓ | | 2027-28 | | | |
| St. Olaf | USCSA | | | | CCSA | | |
| St. Scholastica | | | | | CCSA | | |

== Rivalry trophies ==
Football

- The Goat (Carleton v. St. Olaf) founded 1931
- The Old Paint Bucket (Macalester v. Hamline) founded 1965
- The Troll (Concordia v. St. Olaf) founded 1974
- The Book of Knowledge (Carleton v. Macalester) founded 1998
- The Hammer (Augsburg v. Hamline) founded 2005

Other sports

- The Goat (Carleton and St. Olaf, men's basketball) founded 1913
- The Karhu Shoe (Carleton v. St. Olaf, men's and women's cross country) founded 1972
- The Margate Memorial Trophy (Carleton v. St. Thomas, swimming and diving) founded 1995
- The Presidents Cup (Carleton v. St. Olaf, women's basketball) founded 2001
- The Rolex (Carleton v. St. Olaf, men's track and field)
- The Rusty Putter (Carleton v. St. Olaf, men's golf)

Defunct

- The Power Bowl (Concordia v. Minnesota State University–Moorhead, football) founded 1984, through 1998 as the American Crystal Sugar Bowl, from 1999–2007 as the Power Bowl
- The Holy Grail (Saint John's v. St. Thomas) founded 2001, became defunct after the 2019 game, after which St. Thomas moved to Division I.

== All-Sports Trophy ==
The All-Sports Trophy is given to the school with the best overall record for all MIAC sports in each gender. The men's trophy was first awarded for 1962-63 to Macalester College. St. Olaf College received the first women's trophy in 1983-84. The University of St. Thomas won both the men's and women's trophies from 2008 to 2017. The men's is named the George Durenberger Trophy and the women's is named the Pat Wiesner Trophy Not awarded 2019-20 and 2020-21 due to Covid pandemic.

| Men's | Titles | Last | Women's | Titles | Last |
|---|---|---|---|---|---|
| St. Thomas | 33 | 2019 | St. Thomas | 28 | 2019 |
| Saint John's | 17 | 2024 | Gustavus Adolphus | 10 | 2026 |
| Gustavus Adolphus | 7 | 2026 | St. Benedict | 2 | 1999 |
| Macalester | 5 | 1968 | St. Olaf | 2 | 1985 |
| St. Olaf | 1 | 1979 | | | |

== Football ==
=== Conference titles ===
| Team | Titles | Years won |
|---|---|---|
| Saint John's | 37 | 1932, 1935c, 1936c, 1938, 1953c, 1962, 1963, 1965, 1971c, 1974c, 1975, 1976, 1977, 1979c, 1982, 1985, 1989, 1991, 1993, 1994, 1995c, 1996, 1998, 1999, 2001c, 2002, 2003, 2005, 2006c, 2008, 2009, 2014, 2018, 2019c, 2021, 2022, 2024 |
| Gustavus Adolphus | 22 | 1926, 1927, 1933, 1935c, 1936c, 1937, 1940, 1945, 1946, 1950, 1951, 1952c, 1953c, 1954, 1955, 1958, 1959, 1967, 1968, 1971c, 1972, 1987 |
| St. Thomas (Note: No longer a MIAC member.) | 21 | 1922c, 1929, 1930c, 1939, 1941, 1942c, 1947c, 1948, 1949, 1956, 1973c, 1979c, 1983, 1990, 2010, 2011, 2012, 2015, 2016, 2017, 2019c |
| Concordia | 18 | 1931, 1934, 1942c, 1952c, 1957, 1964, 1969, 1970, 1974c, 1978c, 1979c, 1980, 1981, 1986, 1988c, 1990c, 1995c, 2004 |
| Bethel | 7 | 2000, 2001c, 2006c, 2007, 2013, 2023, 2025 |
| St. Olaf | 6 | 1922c, 1923, 1930c, 1935c, 1978c, 1979c |
| Hamline | 5 | 1920, 1921, 1966, 1984, 1988c |
| UM–Duluth | 3 | 1960, 1961, 1973c |
| Augsburg | 2 | 1928c, 1997 |
| Carleton | 2 | 1924, 1992 |
| Macalester (Note: Did not compete in MIAC football from 2002 through 2020.) | 2 | 1925, 1947c |
| Saint Mary's (Note: Remains a MIAC member, but no longer sponsors football.) | 1 | 1928c |

c = Co-champions
No 1943 and 1944 seasons due to World War II.
No 2020 season due to COVID-19.

== Soccer ==
=== Men's soccer regular season conference titles ===
| Team | Titles | Years won |
|---|---|---|
| Gustavus Adolphus | 16 | 1969, 1970, 1971, 1972, 1983c, 1993, 1994, 2000, 2004c, 2005c, 2006c, 2007c, 2012c, 2013, 2014c, 2018, 2019c |
| Macalester | 11 | 1988c, 1990, 1997, 1998c, 1999, 2001, 2002, 2003, 2005c, 2010, 2015 |
| Saint John's | 9 | 1968, 1976, 1979, 1982, 1983c, 1986, 1988c, 1989c, 2006c |
| St. Thomas (Note: No longer a conference member.) | 9 | 1977, 1978, 1985, 1987, 1991, 1995c, 2016, 2017, 2019c |
| St. Olaf | 9 | 1984, 1992, 1998c, 2004c, 2011c, 2014c, 2022, 2023, 2024 |
| Carleton | 6 | 2007c, 2008, 2009, 2011c, 2012c, 2021 |
| Augsburg | 4 | 1973, 1974, 1975, 1980 |
| Concordia | 2 | 1995c, 1996 |
| Bethel | 1 | 1981 |

c = Co-champions
No championship awarded for 2020 due to Covid pandemic

=== Women's soccer regular season conference titles ===
| Team | Titles | Years won |
|---|---|---|
| Macalester | 8 | 1992, 1997, 1998, 1999, 2000, 2001c, 2004, 2005 |
| St. Thomas (Note: No longer a conference member.) | 8 | 1987, 2001c, 2002c, 2008, 2015c, 2016c, 2018, 2019c |
| Saint Mary's | 7 | 1983, 1985, 1986, 1988, 1989, 1990, 1991c |
| Gustavus Adolphus | 6 | 1984, 1993, 1994, 1995, 1996, 2015c |
| St. Benedict | 5 | 1991c, 2002c, 2003, 2011c, 2013 |
| Concordia | 4 | 2006, 2007, 2009, 2012 |
| Augsburg | 4 | 2014, 2016c, 2017, 2019c |
| Carleton | 3 | 1982, 2010, 2011c |
| St. Catherine | 1 | 2021 |

c = Co-champions
No championship awarded for 2020 due to Covid pandemic

== Basketball ==
=== Men's basketball regular season conference titles ===
| Team | Titles | Years won |
|---|---|---|
| St. Thomas (Note: No longer a conference member.) | 34 | 1924, 1946c, 1949c, 1966, 1967, 1970, 1971, 1972, 1973, 1974, 1981c, 1989c, 1990, 1991c, 1992c, 1994, 1995, 2000, 2002, 2003, 2006c, 2007, 2008, 2009, 2010, 2011c, 2012c, 2013, 2014, 2015, 2016, 2017c, 2019, 2020c |
| Hamline | 19 | 1932, 1933, 1934, 1935, 1936, 1938c, 1939c, 1941, 1942, 1943, 1947, 1948, 1949c, 1950, 1951, 1952, 1953, 1957, 1960 |
| Gustavus Adolphus | 17 | 1925, 1926, 1928, 1938c, 1954, 1955, 1956, 1968, 1975c, 1988, 1991c, 1992c, 1996, 1997, 2004, 2005, 2012c |
| Augsburg | 13 | 1927, 1946c, 1963, 1964, 1965, 1975c, 1976, 1977, 1980, 1984, 1985, 1998, 1999 |
| Saint John's | 10 | 1969, 1978, 1979, 1986, 1987, 1993, 2001, 2018, 2020c, 2022 |
| Carleton | 5 | 1921, 1922, 1923, 2006c, 2011c |
| UM–Duluth | 4 | 1958, 1959, 1961, 1962 |
| St. Olaf | 3 | 1929, 1930, 1989c |
| Concordia | 3 | 1931, 1982, 1983 |
| Macalester | 2 | 1937, 1981c |
| Saint Mary's | 2 | 1939c, 1940 |
| Bethel | 1 | 2017c |

c = Co-champions
No 1943–44 and 1944–45 seasons due to World War II.
No championship awarded for 2020-21 due to Covid pandemic.

=== Women's basketball regular season conference titles ===
| Team | Titles | Years won |
|---|---|---|
| St. Thomas (Note: No longer a conference member.) | 18 | 1983c, 1984, 1991, 1992, 1996, 1997, 1998c, 2000, 2001, 2002c, 2008c, 2011, 2012, 2015, 2016, 2017, 2018, 2019 |
| St. Benedict | 13 | 1989, 1993, 1995, 1998c, 1999, 2002c, 2003c, 2004c, 2006, 2007, 2008c, 2009, 2010c |
| Concordia | 7 | 1982, 1983c, 1986c, 1987c, 1988, 1990, 2013 |
| Carleton | 3 | 2003c, 2004c, 2005 |
| Saint Mary's | 3 | 1985, 1986c, 2014 |
| Gustavus Adolphus | 2 | 2003c, 2010c |
| Bethel | 2 | 1994, 2020 |
| St. Olaf | 1 | 1983c |
| Augsburg | 1 | 2022 |

c = Co-champions
No championship awarded for 2021 due to COVID pandemic.

== Ice hockey ==
=== Men's ice hockey regular season conference titles ===
| Team | Titles | Years won |
|---|---|---|
| St. Thomas (Note: No longer a conference member.) | 34 | 1923c, 1934, 1938c, 1940, 1941, 1942, 1947, 1949, 1951c, 1952, 1953c, 1974, 1983, 1985, 1986, 1989, 1990, 1991, 1992, 1993c, 1994, 1995, 1998c, 1999, 2000, 2001, 2002, 2006, 2012, 2013c, 2014, 2015, 2017, 2018 |
| Gustavus Adolphus | 14 | 1966, 1967, 1968, 1969, 1970, 1971, 1972, 1973, 1975, 1976, 1977c, 1984, 1993c, 2010 |
| Macalester (Note: Remains a conference member, but no longer has a men's ice hockey team.) | 12 | 1923c, 1930, 1931, 1932c, 1933, 1936, 1937, 1939c, 1950c, 1951c, 1962, 1963 |
| Augsburg | 11 | 1928, 1977c, 1978, 1979, 1980, 1981c, 1982, 1998c, 2016, 2019, 2022 |
| UM–Duluth | 9 | 1953c, 1954, 1955, 1956, 1957, 1958, 1959, 1960, 1961 |
| Saint John's | 9 | 1935, 1950c, 1996, 1997, 2003, 2004, 2005, 2013c, 2020 |
| Hamline | 5 | 1923c, 1932c, 1948, 2008, 2011 |
| Saint Mary's | 4 | 1929, 1964, 1965, 1988 |
| St. Olaf | 3 | 1938c, 1939c, 2009 |
| Concordia | 2 | 1981c, 1987 |
| Bethel | 1 | 2007 |

c = Co-champions
No seasons from 1942–43 to 1945–46.
No championship awarded for 2020-21 due to Covid pandemic.

=== Women's ice hockey regular season conference titles ===
| Team | Titles | Years won |
|---|---|---|
| Gustavus Adolphus | 17 | 1999c, 2001, 2002, 2005, 2006, 2007, 2008, 2009, 2010, 2011, 2012, 2013, 2015, 2017, 2018c, 2020, 2022 |
| St. Thomas (Note: No longer a conference member.) | 6 | 2003, 2004, 2014, 2016c, 2018c, 2019 |
| Augsburg | 2 | 1999c, 2000c |
| Saint Mary's | 2 | 1999c, 2000c |
| Bethel | 1 | 2016c |

c = Co-champions
No championship awarded for 2021 due to Covid pandemic

== Facilities ==
| School | Stadium | Capacity | Gymnasium | Capacity | Ice arena | Capacity |
|---|---|---|---|---|---|---|
| Augsburg | Edor Nelson Field | 1,400 | Si Melby Hall | 2,200 | Augsburg Ice Arena | 800 |
| Bethel | Royal Stadium | 8,000 | Robertson Center | 2,000 | Schwan Super Rink | 1,000 |
| Carleton | Laird Stadium | 7,500 | West Gymnasium | 1,240 | Non-Hockey School | N/A |
| Concordia | Jake Christiansen Stadium | 7,000 | Memorial Auditorium | 4,500 | Moorhead Sports Center | 3,000 |
| Gustavus Adolphus | Hollingsworth Field | 3,000 | Gus Young Court | 3,000 | Don Roberts Ice Rink | 1,500 |
| Hamline | Klas Field | 2,000 | Hutton Arena | 2,000 | TRIA Rink at Treasure Island Center | 1,500 |
| Macalester | Macalester Stadium | 4,000 | Leonard Center | 1,200 | Non-Hockey School | N/A |
| St. Benedict | CSB Soccer Field | N/A | Claire Lynch Hall | 1,000 | Municipal Athletic Complex | 1,800 |
| St. Catherine | Soccer Field | N/A | Wildcat Gym | 500 | Drake Arena | 700 |
| Saint John's | Clemens Stadium | 7,482 | Sexton Arena | 2,964 | National Hockey Center | 5,763 |
| St. Olaf | Klein Field at Manitou | 3,500 | Skoglund Center | 3,000 | St. Olaf Ice Arena | 800 |
| St. Scholastica | Saints Field | N/A | Reif Gym | N/A | Mars Lakeview Arena | N/A |

== Commissioner ==
The executive director, a position that was created in 1994, serves as the conference commissioner.

- Carlyle Carter (1994–2005)
- Daniel McKane (2005–present)
