= List of Minnesota Intercollegiate Athletic Conference football standings (1956–1982) =

This is a list of yearly Minnesota Intercollegiate Athletic Conference football standings.

== Minnesota Intercollegiate Athletic Conference football standings ==
1956 Minnesota Intercollegiate Athletic Conference football standings
	Conf.					Overall
Team	W		L		T	W		L		T
St. Thomas (MN) $	7	–	0	–	0	8	–	0	–	0
Concordia (MN)	5	–	2	–	0	6	–	3	–	0
Macalester	4	–	3	–	0	5	–	3	–	0
Gustavus Adolphus	4	–	3	–	0	4	–	5	–	0
Minnesota–Duluth	3	–	4	–	0	3	–	4	–	0
Saint John's (MN)	2	–	4	–	1	3	–	4	–	1
Augsburg	2	–	4	–	1	2	–	5	–	1
Hamline	0	–	7	–	0	1	–	7	–	0
$ – Conference champion

1957 Minnesota Intercollegiate Athletic Conference football standings
	Conf.					Overall
Team	W		L		T	W		L		T
Concordia (MN) $	6	–	1	–	0	7	–	2	–	0
Macalester	5	–	1	–	1	6	–	1	–	1
Gustavus Adolphus	5	–	1	–	1	5	–	3	–	1
Saint John's (MN)	4	–	3	–	0	5	–	3	–	0
Augsburg	3	–	4	–	0	4	–	4	–	0
Minnesota–Duluth	2	–	5	–	0	2	–	5	–	1
St. Thomas (MN)	1	–	5	–	1	2	–	5	–	1
Hamline	0	–	6	–	0	0	–	7	–	1
$ – Conference champion

1958 Minnesota Intercollegiate Athletic Conference football standings
	Conf.					Overall
Team	W		L		T	W		L		T
No. 13 Gustavus Adolphus $^	7	–	0	–	0	8	–	1	–	0
Concordia (MN)	6	–	1	–	0	7	–	2	–	0
Saint John's (MN)	5	–	2	–	0	6	–	2	–	0
Minnesota–Duluth	4	–	3	–	0	4	–	4	–	0
St. Thomas (MN)	3	–	4	–	0	4	–	4	–	0
Macalester	2	–	5	–	0	3	–	6	–	0
Hamline	2	–	5	–	0	2	–	6	–	0
Augsburg	0	–	7	–	0	0	–	8	–	0
$ – Conference champion; ^ – NAIA playoff participant; Rankings from UPI small college poll

1959 Minnesota Intercollegiate Athletic Conference football standings
	Conf.					Overall
Team	W		L		T	W		L		T
Gustavus Adolphus $	7	–	0	–	0	8	–	1	–	0
Concordia (MN)	6	–	1	–	0	7	–	2	–	0
Minnesota–Duluth	4	–	2	–	1	5	–	2	–	1
Saint John's (MN)	4	–	3	–	0	5	–	3	–	0
St. Thomas (MN)	3	–	3	–	1	4	–	3	–	1
Augsburg	2	–	5	–	0	3	–	5	–	0
Macalester	1	–	6	–	0	2	–	6	–	0
Hamline	0	–	7	–	0	0	–	8	–	0
$ – Conference champion

1960 Minnesota Intercollegiate Athletic Conference football standings
	Conf.					Overall
Team	W		L		T	W		L		T
Minnesota–Duluth $	6	–	1	–	0	6	–	1	–	1
Concordia (MN)	5	–	2	–	0	7	–	2	–	0
Macalester	5	–	2	–	0	7	–	2	–	0
Augsburg	4	–	3	–	0	5	–	3	–	0
Saint John's (MN)	3	–	3	–	1	4	–	3	–	1
Gustavus Adolphus	3	–	3	–	1	3	–	5	–	1
St. Thomas (MN)	1	–	6	–	0	2	–	6	–	0
Hamline	0	–	7	–	0	0	–	8	–	0
$ – Conference champion

1961 Minnesota Intercollegiate Athletic Conference football standings
	Conf.					Overall
Team	W		L		T	W		L		T
No. 18 Minnesota–Duluth $	7	–	0	–	0	8	–	1	–	0
Saint John's (MN)	5	–	2	–	0	6	–	2	–	0
St. Thomas (MN)	5	–	2	–	0	6	–	3	–	0
Macalester	4	–	3	–	0	6	–	3	–	0
Augsburg	3	–	4	–	0	4	–	4	–	0
Concordia (MN)	3	–	4	–	0	4	–	5	–	0
Gustavus Adolphus	1	–	6	–	0	2	–	7	–	0
Hamline	0	–	7	–	0	1	–	7	–	0
$ – Conference champion; Rankings from NAIA poll

1962 Minnesota Intercollegiate Athletic Conference football standings
	Conf.					Overall
Team	W		L		T	W		L		T
No. 7 Saint John's (MN) $	7	–	0	–	0	9	–	0	–	0
Minnesota–Duluth	5	–	1	–	1	6	–	2	–	1
St. Thomas (MN)	5	–	2	–	0	6	–	3	–	0
Concordia (MN)	3	–	3	–	1	5	–	3	–	1
Macalester	3	–	4	–	0	3	–	5	–	0
Augsburg	2	–	5	–	0	3	–	5	–	0
Gustavus Adolphus	2	–	5	–	0	2	–	6	–	0
Hamline	0	–	7	–	0	2	–	7	–	0
$ – Conference champion; Rankings from NAIA poll

1963 Minnesota Intercollegiate Athletic Conference football standings
	Conf.					Overall
Team	W		L		T	W		L		T
No. 2 Saint John's (MN) $^	7	–	0	–	0	10	–	0	–	0
Concordia (MN)	6	–	1	–	0	7	–	2	–	0
Augsburg	4	–	3	–	0	4	–	3	–	1
Hamline	3	–	4	–	0	4	–	4	–	1
Gustavus Adolphus	3	–	4	–	0	4	–	5	–	0
St. Thomas (MN)	3	–	4	–	0	4	–	5	–	0
Minnesota–Duluth	2	–	5	–	0	3	–	6	–	0
Macalester	0	–	7	–	0	1	–	8	–	0
$ – Conference champion; ^ – NAIA playoff participant; Rankings from NAIA poll

1964 Minnesota Intercollegiate Athletic Conference football standings
	Conf.					Overall
Team	W		L		T	W		L		T
No. 1 Concordia (MN) $^	7	–	0	–	0	10	–	0	–	1
Augsburg	5	–	2	–	0	6	–	3	–	0
Gustavus Adolphus	4	–	3	–	0	5	–	4	–	0
Saint John's (MN)	4	–	3	–	0	4	–	3	–	0
St. Thomas (MN)	3	–	4	–	0	3	–	6	–	0
Minnesota–Duluth	2	–	5	–	0	4	–	5	–	0
Hamline	2	–	5	–	0	2	–	7	–	0
Macalester	1	–	6	–	0	1	–	7	–	0
$ – Conference champion; ^ – NAIA playoff participant; Rankings from NAIA poll

1965 Minnesota Intercollegiate Athletic Conference football standings
	Conf.					Overall
Team	W		L		T	W		L		T
No. 1 Saint John's (MN) $^	7	–	0	–	0	11	–	0	–	0
No. 19 Concordia (MN)	5	–	2	–	0	6	–	2	–	0
St. Thomas (MN)	4	–	2	–	1	4	–	4	–	1
Gustavus Adolphus	4	–	3	–	0	5	–	4	–	0
Minnesota–Duluth	3	–	4	–	0	4	–	5	–	0
Augsburg	2	–	4	–	1	3	–	5	–	1
Hamline	2	–	5	–	0	3	–	6	–	0
Macalester	0	–	7	–	0	0	–	8	–	0
$ – Conference champion; ^ – NAIA playoff participant; Rankings from NAIA poll

1966 Minnesota Intercollegiate Athletic Conference football standings
	Conf.					Overall
Team	W		L		T	W		L		T
No. 9 Hamline $	6	–	1	–	0	8	–	1	–	0
Gustavus Adolphus	4	–	1	–	2	5	–	2	–	2
Minnesota–Duluth	4	–	2	–	1	5	–	3	–	1
Concordia (MN)	4	–	3	–	0	5	–	3	–	0
Saint John's (MN)	3	–	3	–	1	4	–	3	–	1
Augsburg	3	–	4	–	0	4	–	4	–	1
St. Thomas (MN)	2	–	5	–	0	2	–	6	–	1
Macalester	0	–	7	–	0	2	–	7	–	0
$ – Conference champion; Rankings from NAIA poll

1967 Minnesota Intercollegiate Athletic Conference football standings
	Conf.					Overall
Team	W		L		T	W		L		T
Gustavus Adolphus $	6	–	1	–	0	6	–	3	–	0
Concordia (MN)	5	–	1	–	1	7	–	1	–	1
Minnesota–Duluth	5	–	1	–	1	7	–	1	–	1
St. Thomas (MN)	4	–	3	–	0	6	–	3	–	0
Saint John's (MN)	3	–	4	–	0	3	–	5	–	0
Hamline	2	–	5	–	0	4	–	5	–	0
Macalester	2	–	5	–	0	3	–	6	–	0
Augsburg	0	–	7	–	0	1	–	8	–	0
$ – Conference champion

1968 Minnesota Intercollegiate Athletic Conference football standings
	Conf.					Overall
Team	W		L		T	W		L		T
Gustavus Adolphus $	6	–	0	–	1	7	–	1	–	1
No. 18 Hamline	6	–	1	–	0	8	–	1	–	0
Concordia (MN)	4	–	3	–	0	7	–	3	–	0
Saint John's (MN)	4	–	3	–	0	6	–	4	–	0
Macalester	3	–	3	–	1	5	–	4	–	1
Minnesota–Duluth	2	–	5	–	0	4	–	6	–	0
St. Thomas (MN)	2	–	5	–	0	2	–	8	–	0
Augsburg	0	–	7	–	0	1	–	8	–	0
$ – Conference champion; Rankings from NAIA poll

1969 Minnesota Intercollegiate Athletic Conference football standings
	Conf.					Overall
Team	W		L		T	W		L		T
No. 3 Concordia–Moorhead $^	7	–	0	–	0	10	–	1	–	0
Saint John's (MN)	5	–	1	–	1	8	–	1	–	1
Hamline	5	–	2	–	0	7	–	2	–	0
Gustavus Adolphus	4	–	2	–	1	6	–	3	–	1
Macalester	3	–	4	–	0	5	–	4	–	0
Minnesota–Duluth	2	–	5	–	0	4	–	6	–	0
St. Thomas (MN)	1	–	6	–	0	2	–	8	–	0
Augsburg	0	–	7	–	0	1	–	8	–	0
$ – Conference champion; ^ – NAIA playoff participant; Rankings from NAIA poll

1970 Minnesota Intercollegiate Athletic Conference football standings
	Conf.					Overall
Team	W		L		T	W		L		T
Concordia–Moorhead $	6	–	1	–	0	7	–	2	–	1
No. 14 Gustavus Adolphus	5	–	2	–	0	8	–	2	–	0
Saint John's (MN)	5	–	2	–	0	6	–	3	–	0
Minnesota–Duluth	4	–	2	–	1	7	–	2	–	1
Hamline	3	–	4	–	0	6	–	4	–	0
Macalester	2	–	4	–	1	3	–	5	–	1
Augsburg	1	–	6	–	0	1	–	8	–	0
St. Thomas (MN)	1	–	6	–	0	1	–	9	–	0
$ – Conference champion; Rankings from NAIA Division I poll

1971 Minnesota Intercollegiate Athletic Conference football standings
	Conf.					Overall
Team	W		L		T	W		L		T
No. 7 Saint John's (MN) +	6	–	1	–	0	8	–	1	–	0
Gustavus Adolphus +	6	–	1	–	0	6	–	4	–	0
Minnesota–Duluth	5	–	2	–	0	6	–	3	–	1
Concordia-Moorhead	4	–	3	–	0	7	–	3	–	0
Hamline	4	–	3	–	0	7	–	3	–	0
St. Thomas (MN)	2	–	5	–	0	3	–	7	–	0
Macalester	1	–	6	–	0	1	–	7	–	1
Augsburg	0	–	7	–	0	1	–	8	–	0
+ – Conference co-champions; Rankings from NAIA Division I poll

1972 Minnesota Intercollegiate Athletic Conference football standings
	Conf.					Overall
Team	W		L		T	W		L		T
Gustavus Adolphus $	6	–	1	–	0	6	–	4	–	0
No. 14 Saint John's (MN)	5	–	2	–	0	7	–	2	–	0
Concordia–Moorhead	4	–	3	–	0	6	–	3	–	0
Minnesota–Duluth	4	–	3	–	0	5	–	4	–	0
St. Thomas (MN)	3	–	4	–	0	6	–	4	–	0
Augsburg	3	–	4	–	0	5	–	4	–	0
Hamline	3	–	4	–	0	5	–	4	–	0
Macalester	0	–	7	–	0	0	–	9	–	0
$ – Conference champion; Rankings from NAIA Division I poll

1973 Minnesota Intercollegiate Athletic Conference football standings
	Conf.					Overall
Team	W		L		T	W		L		T
No. 11 St. Thomas (MN) +	6	–	1	–	0	9	–	1	–	0
No. 9 Minnesota–Duluth +	6	–	1	–	0	8	–	1	–	0
Augsburg	5	–	2	–	0	7	–	2	–	0
Gustavus Adolphus	4	–	3	–	0	5	–	5	–	0
Concordia–Moorhead	3	–	4	–	0	5	–	5	–	0
Saint John's (MN)	3	–	4	–	0	4	–	4	–	0
Hamline	1	–	6	–	0	3	–	6	–	0
Macalester	0	–	7	–	0	1	–	9	–	0
+ – Conference co-champions; Rankings from NAIA Division I poll

1974 Minnesota Intercollegiate Athletic Conference football standings
	Conf.					Overall
Team	W		L		T	W		L		T
Concordia–Moorhead +	5	–	2	–	0	7	–	2	–	0
No. 20 Saint John's (MN) +	5	–	2	–	0	7	–	2	–	0
Minnesota–Duluth	4	–	2	–	1	7	–	2	–	1
Hamline	4	–	2	–	1	4	–	5	–	1
St. Thomas (MN)	4	–	3	–	0	5	–	4	–	0
Gustavus Adolphus	4	–	3	–	0	4	–	6	–	0
Augsburg	3	–	4	–	0	5	–	5	–	0
St. Olaf	1	–	6	–	0	3	–	6	–	0
Macalester	1	–	6	–	0	2	–	8	–	0
+ – Conference co-champions; Macalester's win over Gustavus Adolphus counted in the conference standings for Macalester, but not for Gustavus Adolphus.; Rankings from NAIA Division I poll

1975 Minnesota Intercollegiate Athletic Conference football standings
	Conf.					Overall
Team	W		L		T	W		L		T
No. 13 Saint John's (MN) $	6	–	0	–	1	8	–	1	–	1
Minnesota–Duluth	6	–	1	–	0	8	–	2	–	0
Hamline	4	–	3	–	0	5	–	5	–	0
Gustavus Adolphus	4	–	3	–	0	4	–	5	–	0
St. Olaf	3	–	3	–	1	5	–	3	–	1
Concordia–Moorhead	3	–	4	–	0	5	–	4	–	0
St. Thomas (MN)	3	–	4	–	0	3	–	6	–	0
Augsburg	1	–	6	–	0	2	–	8	–	0
Macalester	0	–	7	–	0	0	–	10	–	0
$ – Conference champion; Rankings from NAIA Division I poll

1976 Minnesota Intercollegiate Athletic Conference football standings
	Conf.					Overall
Team	W		L		T	W		L		T
Saint John's (MN) $^	7	–	0	–	0	10	–	0	–	1
St. Olaf	5	–	2	–	0	7	–	3	–	0
St. Thomas (MN)	5	–	2	–	0	7	–	3	–	0
Concordia–Moorhead	5	–	2	–	0	6	–	3	–	0
Gustavus Adolphus	3	–	4	–	0	5	–	5	–	0
Hamline	2	–	5	–	0	4	–	5	–	0
Augsburg	1	–	6	–	0	1	–	8	–	0
Macalester	0	–	7	–	0	0	–	8	–	0
$ – Conference champion; ^ – NCAA Division III playoff participant; St. Thomas (MN) received a non-conference forfeit win from St. Cloud State.

1977 Minnesota Intercollegiate Athletic Conference football standings
	Conf.					Overall
Team	W		L		T	W		L		T
Saint John's (MN) $^	7	–	0	–	0	7	–	2	–	0
Concordia–Moorhead	5	–	2	–	0	7	–	3	–	0
Gustavus Adolphus	5	–	2	–	0	6	–	4	–	0
St. Thomas (MN)	3	–	3	–	1	4	–	5	–	1
Augsburg	3	–	4	–	0	3	–	6	–	0
St. Olaf	2	–	4	–	1	5	–	4	–	1
Hamline	2	–	5	–	0	2	–	7	–	0
Macalester	0	–	7	–	0	0	–	9	–	0
$ – Conference champion; ^ – NCAA Division III playoff participant

1978 Minnesota Intercollegiate Athletic Conference football standings
	Conf.					Overall
Team	W		L		T	W		L		T
No. 1 Concordia–Moorhead * +	7	–	1	–	0	11	–	1	–	0
St. Olaf +^	7	–	1	–	0	9	–	2	–	0
No. 15 Gustavus Adolphus	6	–	2	–	0	8	–	2	–	0
No. T–20 Saint John's (MN)	5	–	3	–	0	6	–	3	–	0
St. Thomas (MN)	4	–	4	–	0	5	–	4	–	0
Hamline	3	–	4	–	1	5	–	4	–	1
Augsburg	2	–	5	–	1	3	–	6	–	1
Bethel (MN)	1	–	7	–	0	2	–	8	–	0
Macalester	0	–	8	–	0	0	–	9	–	0
+ – Conference co-champions; ^ – NCAA Division III playoff participant; * – NAIA Division II playoff participant; Rankings from NAIA Division II poll

1979 Minnesota Intercollegiate Athletic Conference football standings
	Conf.					Overall
Team	W		L		T	W		L		T
No. 13 Saint John's (MN) +	6	–	2	–	0	7	–	2	–	0
St. Olaf +	6	–	2	–	0	7	–	3	–	0
No. 15 Concordia–Moorhead +	6	–	2	–	0	6	–	3	–	0
No. 17 St. Thomas (MN) +	6	–	2	–	0	6	–	3	–	0
Gustavus Adolphus	5	–	3	–	0	7	–	3	–	0
Hamline	3	–	5	–	0	5	–	5	–	0
Augsburg	3	–	5	–	0	4	–	6	–	0
Bethel (MN)	1	–	7	–	0	2	–	8	–	0
Macalester	0	–	8	–	0	0	–	8	–	0
+ – Conference co-champions; Rankings from NAIA Division II poll

1980 Minnesota Intercollegiate Athletic Conference football standings
	Conf.					Overall
Team	W		L		T	W		L		T
Concordia–Moorhead $	7	–	1	–	0	8	–	2	–	0
No.16 Gustavus Adolphus	6	–	2	–	0	7	–	3	–	0
Saint John's (MN)	5	–	3	–	0	5	–	3	–	0
Hamline	5	–	3	–	0	5	–	4	–	0
St. Olaf	4	–	4	–	0	6	–	4	–	0
Augsburg	4	–	4	–	0	5	–	5	–	0
St. Thomas (MN)	2	–	5	–	1	3	–	6	–	1
Bethel (MN)	2	–	6	–	0	2	–	8	–	0
Macalester	0	–	7	–	1	1	–	7	–	1
$ – Conference champion; Rankings from NAIA Division II poll

1981 Minnesota Intercollegiate Athletic Conference football standings
	Conf.					Overall
Team	W		L		T	W		L		T
No. 1 Concordia–Moorhead $^	8	–	0	–	0	11	–	0	–	2
No. 15 Saint John's (MN)	6	–	2	–	0	7	–	2	–	0
No. 19 St. Thomas (MN)	6	–	2	–	0	7	–	2	–	0
Gustavus Adolphus	5	–	3	–	0	6	–	4	–	0
Augsburg	3	–	5	–	0	4	–	6	–	0
Macalester	2	–	6	–	0	4	–	6	–	0
St. Olaf	2	–	6	–	0	4	–	7	–	0
Bethel (MN)	2	–	6	–	0	3	–	7	–	0
Hamline	2	–	6	–	0	3	–	7	–	0
$ – Conference champion; ^ – NAIA Division II playoff participant; Rankings from NAIA Division II poll

1982 Minnesota Intercollegiate Athletic Conference football standings
	Conf.					Overall
Team	W		L		T	W		L		T
No. 3 Saint John's (MN) $^	8	–	0	–	0	9	–	1	–	0
No. 12 St. Thomas (MN)	6	–	2	–	0	8	–	2	–	0
Gustavus Adolphus	6	–	2	–	0	6	–	4	–	0
Concordia–Moorhead	5	–	3	–	0	6	–	4	–	0
Hamline #	5	–	3	–	0	6	–	4	–	0
Augsburg	2	–	5	–	1	2	–	7	–	1
Bethel (MN)	1	–	6	–	1	1	–	8	–	1
Macalester	1	–	7	–	0	2	–	8	–	0
St. Olaf	1	–	7	–	0	2	–	8	–	0
Carleton *	0	–	0	–	0	6	–	2	–	0
$ – Conference champion; ^ – NAIA Division II playoff participant # – Hamline initially forfeited 5 conference wins—over Augsburg, St. Olaf, Macalester, Concordia–Moorhead, and Bethel (MN)—because a player was ruled ineligible under NAIA rules, but the player was later ruled eligible under MIAC code, and the wins were restored to Hamline. * – ineligible for conference title; Rankings from NAIA Division II poll
