= Jim Christopherson =

American gridiron football player and coach (born 1938)

Biographical details
- Born: February 17, 1938 (age 88); Wadena, Minnesota, U.S.

Playing career
- 1956–1959: Concordia–Moorhead
- 1962: Minnesota Vikings
- 1964: Toronto Argonauts
- Positions: Halfback, linebacker, placekicker

Coaching career (HC unless noted)
- 1963–1968: Concordia–Moorhead (assistant)
- 1969–2000: Concordia–Moorhead

Head coaching record
- Overall: 217–102–7
- Tournaments: 1–1 (NAIA playoff); 5–0–1 (NAIA Division II playoffs); 2–4 (NCAA D-III playoffs)

Accomplishments and honors

Championships
- 2 NAIA Division II (1978, 1981); 11 MIAC (1969–1970, 1974, 1978–1981, 1986, 1988, 1990, 1995)

Awards
- NAIA Division II Coach of the Year (1981); MIAC Player of the Year (1959); 4× MIAC Coach of the Year (1980–1981, 1986, 1995)
- College Football Hall of Fame; Inducted in 2007 (profile)

James Monroe Christopherson (born February 17, 1938) is an American football player and coach. He played professional football for the Minnesota Vikings in 1962 and was the head coach at Concordia College in Moorhead, Minnesota from 1969 to 2000. He was inducted into the College Football Hall of Fame in 2007.

He has a wife (Sandra (Sandy) Christopherson) and two children: A son, Reid and a daughter Heather.

Christopherson coached the Cobbers for 32 seasons, from 1969 to 2000. During that time he amassed a 217–102–7 record. He helped guide the Cobbers to NAIA national championships in 1978 and 1981 and won 11 Minnesota Intercollegiate Athletic Conference (MIAC) titles during his tenure.

When Christopherson retired in 2000 he was third in wins among active NCAA Division III coaches. He was also fifth in winning percentage among active Division III coaches with more than 15 years of experience and 16th in winning percentage among all active Division III coaches. He was also among an elite group of coaches who have coached for over 30 years at the same school.

Christopherson, who played for the Minnesota Vikings for two seasons, is the first player or coach from Concordia to receive the college game's highest honor. He became only the second player or coach from the MIAC to be enshrined in the Hall of Fame.

During his tenure at Concordia, Christopherson guided 16 players to All-American honors. He also produced over 120 athletes that were named to the MIAC All-Conference Team, including Barry Bennett, Sr. and Barry Bennett Jr.

As a player for the Cobbers, Christopherson was the team captain in 1959 and was named the MIAC Most Valuable Player during that season.

In addition to coaching football, Christopherson also taught sailing at Concordia.

== Head coaching record ==
Year	Team	Overall	Conference	Standing	Bowl/playoffs
Concordia Cobbers (Minnesota Intercollegiate Athletic Conference) (1969–2000)
1969	Concordia–Moorhead	10–1	7–0	1st	L NAIA Championship
1970	Concordia–Moorhead	7–2–1	6–1	1st	
1971	Concordia–Moorhead	7–3	4–3	T–4th	
1972	Concordia–Moorhead	6–3	4–3	T–3rd	
1973	Concordia–Moorhead	5–5	3–4	T–5th	
1974	Concordia–Moorhead	7–2	5–2	T–1st	
1975	Concordia–Moorhead	5–4	3–4	T–5th	
1976	Concordia–Moorhead	6–3	5–2	T–2nd	
1977	Concordia–Moorhead	7–2	5–2	T–2nd	
1978	Concordia–Moorhead	11–1	7–1	T–1st	W NAIA Division II Championship
1979	Concordia–Moorhead	6–3	6–2	T–1st	
1980	Concordia–Moorhead	8–2	7–1	1st	
1981	Concordia–Moorhead	11–0–2	8–0	1st	T NAIA Division II Championship
1982	Concordia–Moorhead	6–4	5–3	T–4th	
1983	Concordia–Moorhead	5–6	4–5	6th	
1984	Concordia–Moorhead	4–5–1	3–5–1	T–7th	
1985	Concordia–Moorhead	7–3	7–2	T–2nd	
1986	Concordia–Moorhead	11–2	9–0	1st	L NCAA Division III Semifinal
1987	Concordia–Moorhead	7–3	7–2	T–2nd	
1988	Concordia–Moorhead	9–2	8–1	T–1st	L NCAA Division III First Round
1989	Concordia–Moorhead	7–2–1	6–2–1	2nd	
1990	Concordia–Moorhead	7–3	7–2	T–1st	
1991	Concordia–Moorhead	3–6	3–5	T–7th	
1992	Concordia–Moorhead	7–2–1	6–2–1	3rd	
1993	Concordia–Moorhead	6–4	6–3	T–3rd	
1994	Concordia–Moorhead	6–4	6–3	T–3rd	
1995	Concordia–Moorhead	8–2–1	7–1–1	T–1st	L NCAA Division III First Round
1996	Concordia–Moorhead	6–4	6–3	4th	
1997	Concordia–Moorhead	8–3	7–2	T–2nd	L NCAA Division III First Round
1998	Concordia–Moorhead	4–6	4–5	6th	
1999	Concordia–Moorhead	6–4	6–3	5th	
2000	Concordia–Moorhead	4–6	4–5	6th	
Concordia–Moorhead:		217–102–7	181–79–4		
Total:		217–102–7			
National championship Conference title Conference division title or championship game berth

== See also ==
- List of college football career coaching wins leaders
