= Loren Dawson =

American football coach (born c. 1966)

Current position
- Title: Head coach
- Team: American Leadership Academy Ironwood (AZ)

Biographical details
- Born: c. 1966 (age 59–60); Casa Grande, Arizona, U.S.
- Education: Arizona State University (1993, 1998)

Playing career
- 1984–1986: Phoenix College
- 1987: Austin
- Position: Defensive back

Coaching career (HC unless noted)
- 1990–1992: Bourgade Catholic HS (AZ) (assistant)
- 1993: Midwestern State (GA)
- 1994–1995: Bourgade Catholic HS (AZ)
- 1996–1998: Phoenix College (OL/LB)
- 1999–2001: Phoenix College (AHC/ST/DB)
- 2002–2007: Austin (DC/ST)
- 2008–2009: Colorado Mines (ST/LB)
- 2010–2022: Austin
- 2023–present: American Leadership Academy (AZ)

Head coaching record
- Overall: 37–85 (college)

Loren Dawson (born c. 1966) is an American high school football coach. He is the head football coach for the American Leadership Academy, a position he has held since 2023. He was the head football coach for Austin College from 2010 to 2022.

== Playing career ==
Dawson grew up in Casa Grande, Arizona, and played high school football for Casa Grande Union High School. In 1984, he played college football for Phoenix College. In 1987, he transferred to Austin College as a defensive back under head coach Mel Tjeerdsma.

== Coaching career ==
In 1990, Dawson began his coaching career as an assistant coach for Bourgade Catholic High School. In 1993, he served as a graduate assistant for Midwestern State under head coach Mike Calcote. In 1994, he returned to Bourgade Catholic as the head coach. After two years as head coach, he joined Phoenix College as the offensive line coach and linebackers coach. In 1999, he was promoted to assistant head coach, special teams coordinator, and defensive backs coach. In 2002, Dawson served as the defensive coordinator and special teams coordinator for his first stint with Austin under head coaches David Norman and Ronnie Gage. In 2008, he was the special teams coordinator and linebackers coach for Colorado Mines under head coach Bob Stitt.

In 2010, Dawson earned his first college head coaching position for Austin College. In thirteen years as head coach he led the team to a 37–85 record and increased the team's roster to over 100 during his tenure. His best seasons came from 2013 to 2015 and in 2019 when the team finished 5–5. He resigned following the 2022 season.

In 2023, Dawson returned to high school football as the head football coach for American Leadership Academy Ironwood.

== Head coaching record ==
=== College ===
Year	Team	Overall	Conference	Standing	Bowl/playoffs
Austin Kangaroos (Southern Collegiate Athletic Conference) (2010–2011)
2010	Austin	4–5	2–4	T–5th	
2011	Austin	0–10	0–6	7th	
Austin Kangaroos (NCAA Division III independent) (2012)
2012	Austin	2–8			
Austin Kangaroos (Southern Collegiate Athletic Conference) (2013–2016)
2013	Austin	5–5	2–1	2nd	
2014	Austin	5–5	1–2	3rd	
2015	Austin	5–5	1–2	3rd	
2016	Austin	3–7	1–5	4th	
Austin Kangaroos (Southern Athletic Association) (2017–2020)
2017	Austin	3–7	1–7	9th	
2018	Austin	2–8	2–6	8th	
2019	Austin	5–5	4–4	5th	
2020–21	Austin	1–3	1–3	T–6th	
Austin Kangaroos (American Southwest Conference) (2021–2022)
2021	Austin	1–8	1–8	10th	
2022	Austin	1–9	1–7	T–8th	
Austin:		37–85	17–55		
Total:		37–85			
