= Larry Kramer (American football) =

American football player and coach (1942–2014)

Biographical details
- Born: April 6, 1942; Austin, Minnesota, U.S.
- Died: January 25, 2014 (aged 71); Rossville, Kansas, U.S.

Playing career

Football
- 1962–1964: Nebraska
- Position: Tackle

Coaching career (HC unless noted)

Football
- 1965: Nebraska (assistant freshmen)
- 1966: McCook (assistant)
- 1967–1969: McCook
- 1965: Southern Oregon
- 1973–1982: Austin
- 1983–1994: Emporia State
- 1995–1997: Kansas State (assistant)

Baseball
- 1975–1977: Austin

Head coaching record
- Overall: 124–115–5 (college football); 19–66 (college baseball); 18–9–3 (junior college football)
- Tournaments: Football; 2–1–1 (NAIA D-II playoffs); 2–3 (NAIA D-I playoffs)

Accomplishments and honors

Championships
- Football; 1 NAIA Division II (1981); 2 TIAA (1979, 1981); 1 CISC (1989)

Awards
- Consensus All-American (1964); First-team All-Big Eight (1964); 2× TIAA Coach of the Year (1979, 1981)

Larry Ronald Kramer (April 6, 1942 – January 25, 2014) was an American football player and coach of football and baseball. He played college football at University of Nebraska–Lincoln, where he was consensus selection at tackle to the 1964 College Football All-America Team. Kramer served as the head football coach at Southern Oregon College—now known as Southern Oregon University—in Ashland, Oregon from 1970 to 1971, Austin College in Sherman, Texas from 1973 to 1982, and Emporia State University in Emporia, Kansas from 1983 to 1994, compiling career college football coaching record of 124–115–5. He led his 1981 Austin team to a share of the NAIA Division II Football National Championship.

== Coaching career ==
After a training camp stint with the Minnesota Vikings of the National Football League (NFL), Kramer returned his alma mater, Nebraska, as an assistant coach for the freshman football team. In 1966, he was hired as an assistant football coach at McCook Junior College in McCook, Nebraska. Kramer was promoted to head coach a year later, leading to the team to a record of 18–9–3 in three seasons.

=== Southern Oregon ===
Kramer was the head football coach at Southern Oregon University in Ashland, Oregon. He held that position for the 1970 and 1971 seasons. His coaching record at Southern Oregon was 3–17.

=== Austin ===
Kramer was initially hired in May 1973 by Austin College to serve as defensive coordinator for the football team and head baseball coach. A month later, he was named head football coach, succeeding Duane Nutt, who was appointed co-assistant athletic director. Kramer was Austin's head football coach for ten seasons, from 1973 to 1982, and led the Kangaroos to a share of the NAIA Division II Football National Championship in 1981. He was named Texas Intercollegiate Athletic Association (TIAA) Coach of the Year in 1979 and 1981.

=== Emporia State ===
Kramer was the 18th head football coach for Emporia State University in Emporia, Kansas and he held that position for twelve seasons, from 1983 until 1994. His coaching record at Emporia State was 71–54. While at Emporia State, Kramer coached future National Football League (NFL) standout Leon Lett.

== Personal life ==
Kramer earned a bachelor's degree from the University of Nebraska–Lincoln in 1965 and a master's degree in 1966. He and his wife have four children.

== Head coaching record ==
=== College football ===
Year	Team	Overall	Conference	Standing	Bowl/playoffs
Southern Oregon Red Raiders (Evergreen Conference) (1970–1972)
1970	Southern Oregon	1–9	1–5	7th	
1971	Southern Oregon	2–8	1–4	6th	
Southern Oregon:		3–17	2–9		
Austin Kangaroos (NAIA Division II independent) (1973–1975)
1973	Austin	3–5–1			
1974	Austin	2–6–1			
1975	Austin	3–5–1			
Austin Kangaroos (Texas Intercollegiate Athletic Association) (1976–1982)
1976	Austin	3–7	0–4	5th	
1977	Austin	1–8	1–3	4th	
1978	Austin	3–6–1	2–5–1	4th	
1979	Austin	9–2	7–1	1st	L NAIA Division II Quarterfinal
1980	Austin	8–2	8–2	2nd	
1981	Austin	11–1–1	9–1	T–1st	T NAIA Division II Championship
1982	Austin	7–2	6–2	2nd	
Austin:		50–44–5	33–18–1		
Emporia State Hornets (Central States Intercollegiate Conference) (1983–1989)
1983	Emporia State	2–8	1–6	T–7th	
1984	Emporia State	3–7	2–5	T–6th	
1985	Emporia State	6–4	3–4	T–4th	
1986	Emporia State	8–2	5–2	2nd	
1987	Emporia State	7–4	4–3	T–3rd	L NAIA Division I First Round
1988	Emporia State	8–3	5–2	T–2nd	L NAIA Division I First Round
1989	Emporia State	11–2	3–0	1st	L NAIA Division I Championship
Emporia State Hornets (NCAA Division II independent) (1990–1994)
1990	Emporia State	6–4			
Emporia State Hornets (Missouri / Mid-America Intercollegiate Athletic Association) (1991–1994)
1991	Emporia State	5–5	4–5	T–6th	
1992	Emporia State	7–3	6–3	T–3rd	
1993	Emporia State	3–7	3–6	T–6th	
1994	Emporia State	5–5	4–5	7th	
Emporia State:		71–54	40–41		
Total:		124–115–5			
National championship Conference title Conference division title or championship game berth
