= Malosky =

Malosky may refer to:

- Jim Malosky (1928–2011), American football coach
- Lisa Malosky, American sports reporter
