= Tony Joe White (American football) =

American football coach (born 1973)

Current position
- Title: Head coach
- Team: Austin
- Conference: SCAC
- Record: 6–23

Biographical details
- Born: July 5, 1973 (age 53)
- Education: Texas State University (1996); Louisiana Tech University (1997)

Playing career
- 1991–1993: East Texas State
- Position: Quarterback

Coaching career (HC unless noted)
- 1994–1995: Southwest Texas State (SA)
- 1996–1997: Louisiana Tech (GA)
- 1998–1999: Southwest Baptist (QB)
- 2000: Southeast Missouri State (ST/WR)
- 2001–2004: Southeast Missouri State (ST/RB)
- 2005: Brownsboro HS (TX) (assistant)
- 2006–2007: Belhaven (ST/QB)
- 2008–2016: Centre (OC/QB)
- 2017–2022: Birmingham–Southern
- 2023–present: Austin

Head coaching record
- Overall: 41–44
- Tournaments: 1–1 (NCAA D-III playoffs)

Tony Joe White (born July 5, 1973) is an American college football coach. He is the head football coach for Austin College, a position he has held since 2023. He was the head football coach for Birmingham–Southern College from 2017 to 2022. He also coached for Southwest Texas State, Louisiana Tech, Southwest Baptist, Southeast Missouri State, Brownsboro High School, Belhaven, and Centre. He played college football for East Texas State as a quarterback.

== Head coaching record ==
Year	Team	Overall	Conference	Standing	Bowl/playoffs	AFCA^{#}
Birmingham–Southern Panthers (Southern Athletic Association) (2017–2022)
2017	Birmingham–Southern	3–7	2–6	T–6th		
2018	Birmingham–Southern	6–4	4–4	4th		
2019	Birmingham–Southern	7–3	6–2	3rd		
2020–21	Birmingham–Southern	2–2	2–2	T–4th		
2021	Birmingham–Southern	10–2	6–1	2nd	L NCAA Division III Second Round	19
2022	Birmingham–Southern	7–3	5–2	T–2nd		
Birmingham–Southern:		35–21	25–17			
Austin Kangaroos (American Southwest Conference) (2023)
2023	Austin	1–9	0–5	T–6th		
Austin Kangaroos (Southern Collegiate Athletic Conference) (2024–present)
2024	Austin	2–8	2–6	4th		
2025	Austin	3–6	1–4	T–4th		
2026	Austin	0–0	0–0			
Austin:		6–23	3–15			
Total:		41–44				
