= 1978 college football season =

The 1978 college football season may refer to:

- 1978 NCAA Division I-A football season
- 1978 NCAA Division I-AA football season
- 1978 NCAA Division II football season
- 1978 NCAA Division III football season
- 1978 NAIA Division I football season
- 1978 NAIA Division II football season
