= Stan McGarvey =

American football player and coach (born 1949)

Idk Man
Biographical details
- Born: May 7, 1949 (age 77)

Playing career
- 1967: William Jewell
- 1970–1972: William Jewell

Coaching career (HC unless noted)
- 1973–1974: Pattonville HS (MO)
- 1975: Illinois (GA)
- 1977: Tulsa (OB/RC)
- 1978–1980: William Jewell
- 1981–1982: Cincinnati (assistant)
- 1983: Austin
- 1984: Sam Houston State (OC/QB)
- 1985: Montreal Concordes (OB)
- 1986: Montreal Alouettes (RB/WR)
- 1987–1988: William Jewell
- 1991–1996: Missouri Western State
- 1997–2001: West Texas A&M
- 2002–2004: Del Valle HS (TX)
- 2004–2007: Dangerfield HS (TX)
- 2008–2012: Marshfield HS (MO)
- 2013–2019: Hillsboro HS (TX) (OL)

Head coaching record
- Overall: 103–78–4 (college)
- Bowls: 0–1
- Tournaments: 1–1 (NAIA D-II playoffs)

Accomplishments and honors

Championships
- 2 HAAC (1979–1980)

Awards
- NAIA Division II Coach of the Year (1980)

Stan McGarvey (born May 7, 1949) is an American former football coach. He served as the head football coach at William Jewell College from 1978 to 1980 and again from 1987 to 1988, Austin College in 1983, Missouri Western State University from 1991 to 1996, and West Texas A&M University, from 1997 to 2001, compiling a career college football coaching record of 103–78–4. McGarvey won the NAIA Division II Coach of the Year award in 1980 at William Jewell. He is currently retired and resides in Hillsboro, Texas.

== Head coaching record ==
=== College ===
| Year | Team | Overall | Conference | Standing | Bowl/playoffs |
|---|---|---|---|---|---|
William Jewell Cardinals (Heart of America Athletic Conference) (1978–1980)
| 1978 | William Jewell | 4–6 | 2–4 | 5th | |
| 1979 | William Jewell | 9–2 | 5–1 | T–1st | L Moila Shrine Classic |
| 1980 | William Jewell | 11–1–1 | 7–0–1 | T–1st | L NAIA Division II Semifinal |
Austin Kangaroos (Texas Intercollegiate Athletic Association) (1983)
| 1983 | Austin | 6–4 | 3–3 | 3rd | |
| Austin: | | 6–4 | 3–3 | | |
William Jewell Cardinals (Heart of America Athletic Conference) (1987–1988)
| 1987 | William Jewell | 5–5 | 3–3 | 3rd | |
| 1988 | William Jewell | 4–5–1 | 3–4 | T–5th | |
| William Jewell: | | 33–19–2 | 20–12–1 | | |
Missouri Western State Griffons (Mid-America Intercollegiate Athletics Association) (1991–1996)
| 1991 | Missouri Western State | 4–7 | 2–7 | 9th | |
| 1992 | Missouri Western State | 5–6 | 4–5 | 6th | |
| 1993 | Missouri Western State | 8–2–1 | 6–2–1 | T–3rd | |
| 1994 | Missouri Western State | 8–3 | 6–3 | T–3rd | |
| 1995 | Missouri Western State | 7–3–1 | 6–3 | T–2nd | |
| 1996 | Missouri Western State | 7–4 | 5–4 | T–4th | |
| Missouri Western State: | | 39–25–2 | 29–24–1 | | |
West Texas A&M Buffaloes (Lone Star Conference) (1997–2001)
| 1997 | West Texas A&M | 7–4 | 6–3 | 4th | |
| 1998 | West Texas A&M | 8–3 | 7–2 | 3rd | |
| 1999 | West Texas A&M | 3–8 | 3–7 | T–14th | |
| 2000 | West Texas A&M | 5–6 | 4–4 | T–7th | |
| 2001 | West Texas A&M | 2–9 | 0–8 | 13th | |
| West Texas A&M: | | 25–30 | 20–24 | | |
| Total: | | 103–78–4 | | | |
National championship Conference title Conference division title or championship game berth
