= Luz-Guerrero Early College High School =

Public charter school in Tucson, Arizona

Location
- 2797 N Introspect Drive; Tucson, Arizona 85745; United States; 32°15′24″N 111°1′28″W

Information
- School type: Public charter high school
- Established: 1997
- Closed: 2015
- Grades: 9-12
- Colors: Silver, white, and light blue
- Athletics conference: Southern Arizona Athletic Association
- Mascot: White Tigers

Luz-Guerrero Early College High School was a public charter high school in Tucson, Arizona. The name was changed when dual enrollment was offered to students which resulted in most if not all graduates receiving college credit for courses. It is operated by Luz Social Services, Inc. The school had previously went by the name Luz Academy of Tucson, which remained the legal name of the charter holder. Luz Academy of Tucson was started by Pepe Baron. Baron subsequently passed around 2007, which resulted in the decline of the school and its population and enrollment.

On the same campus was Adalberto M. Guerrero Middle School, a middle school operated by the same company. The Arizona State Board for Charter Schools filed a notice of intent to revoke the charter in April 2012. The school failed to submit its fiscal year 2011 audit. A hearing with an administrative law judge is scheduled to take place in August.
