= 1962 Minnesota Intercollegiate Athletic Conference football season =

- Sport: Football
- Number of teams: 6
- Champion: Saint John's (MN)

Football seasons
- ← 1961 1963 →

1962 Minnesota Intercollegiate Athletic Conference football standings
	Conf.					Overall
Team	W		L		T	W		L		T
No. 7 Saint John's (MN) $	7	–	0	–	0	9	–	0	–	0
Minnesota–Duluth	5	–	1	–	1	6	–	2	–	1
St. Thomas (MN)	5	–	2	–	0	6	–	3	–	0
Concordia (MN)	3	–	3	–	1	5	–	3	–	1
Macalester	3	–	4	–	0	3	–	5	–	0
Augsburg	2	–	5	–	0	3	–	5	–	0
Gustavus Adolphus	2	–	5	–	0	2	–	6	–	0
Hamline	0	–	7	–	0	2	–	7	–	0
$ – Conference champion; Rankings from NAIA poll

The 1962 Minnesota Intercollegiate Athletic Conference football season was the season of college football played by the eight member schools of the Minnesota Intercollegiate Athletic Conference (MIAC) as part of the 1962 NCAA College Division football season.

The Saint John's Johnnies, in their 18th year under head coach John Gagliardi, won the conference championship with a perfect 9–0 record, outscoring opponents by a total of 274 to 94.

== Teams ==
=== Saint John's ===
1962 Saint John's Johnnies football

MIAC champion
- Conference: Minnesota Intercollegiate Athletic Conference
- Record: 9–0 (7–0 MIAC)
- Head coach: John Gagliardi (10th season)

The 1962 Saint John's Johnnies football team represented Saint John's University of Collegeville, Minnesota. In their tenth year under head coach John Gagliardi, the Johnnies compiled a perfect 9–0 record (7–0 against MIAC opponents), won the MIAC championship, and outscored opponents by a total of 274 to 94. The Johnnies were not invited to the National Association of Intercollegiate Athletics football playoffs in 1962.

It was the first perfect season in Saint John's football history. Additional perfect seasons followed in 1963 (NAIA national champion), 1965 (NAIA national champion), and 2003 (NCAA Division III national champion).

St. John's halfback Bob Spinner led the MIAC in scoring with 66 points on 10 touchdowns and six extra points.

Date	Opponent	Site	Result	Attendance	Source
September 8	at Bemidji State*	Bemidji, MN	W 30–14		
September 15	at St. Cloud State*	Selke Field; St. Cloud, MN	W 36–6		
September 22	Minnesota–Duluth	Collegeville, MN	W 6–0		
September 29	at Gustavus Adolphus	St. Peter, MN	W 28–8		
October 6	Augsburg	Collegeville, MN	W 36–20		
October 13	at Concordia (MN)	Moorhead, MN	W 31–14		
October 20	Macalester	Collegeville, MN	W 43–9		
October 27	St. Thomas (MN)	Collegeville, MN	W 28–23		
November 3	at Hamline	St. Paul, MN	W 36–0		
*Non-conference game

=== Minnesota–Duluth ===
1962 Minnesota–Duluth Bulldogs football
- Conference: Minnesota Intercollegiate Athletic Conference
- Record: 6–2–1 (5–1–1 MIAC)
- Head coach: Jim Malosky (5th season)

The 1962 Minnesota–Duluth Bulldogs football team represented the University of Minnesota Duluth of Duluth, Minnesota. In their fifth year under head coach Jim Malosky, the Bulldogs compiled a 6–2–1 record (5–1–1 against MIAC opponents), finished in second place in the MIAC, and outscored opponents by a total of 151 to 52.

Date	Opponent	Site	Result	Attendance	Source
September 8	at Wisconsin-Superior*	Superior, WI	L 6–7		
September 15	Northern Michigan	Duluth, MN	W 14–0		
September 22	at Saint John's	Collegeville, N	L 0–6		
September 29	St. Thomas	Duluth, MN	W 22–0		
October 6	Macalester	Duluth, MN	W 14–10		
October 13	at Augsubrg	Minneapolis, MN	W 31–8		
October 20	at Gustavus Adolphus	St. Peter, MN	W 22–6		
November 3	Concordia (MN)	Duluth, MN	T 8–8		
*Non-conference game

=== St. Thomas ===
1962 St. Thomas Tommies football
- Conference: Minnesota Intercollegiate Athletic Conference
- Record: 6–3 (5–2 MIAC)
- Head coach: Nate Harlan (5th season)

The 1962 St. Thomas Tommies football team represented the University of St. Thomas of Saint Paul, Minnesota. In their fifth year under head coach Nate Harlan, the Tommies compiled a 6–3 record (5–2 against MIAC opponents), finished in third place in the MIAC, and outscored opponents by a total of 199 to 115.

Date	Opponent	Site	Result	Attendance	Source
September 9	St. Norbert	St. Paul, MN	L 12–27		
September 15	at Wisconsin-Platteville	Platteville, WI	W 20–0		
September 22	Macalester	St. Paul, MN	W 20–6		
September 29	at Minnesota Duluth	Duluth, MN	L 0–22		
October 6	Concordia (MN)	St. Paul, MN	W 38–8		
October 13	Gustavus Adolphus	St. Paul, MN	W 27–16		
October 20	Hamline	St. Paul, MN	W 20–0		
October 27	at Saint John's	Collegeville, MN	L 23–28		
November 3	Augsburg	St. Paul, MN	W 39–8		

=== Concordia ===
1962 Concordia Cobbers football
- Conference: Minnesota Intercollegiate Athletic Conference
- Record: 5–3–1 (3–3–1 MIAC)
- Head coach: Jake Christiansen (22nd season)

The 1962 Concordia Cobbers football team represented the Concordia College of Moorhead, Minnesota. In their 22nd year under head coach Jake Christiansen, the Cobbers compiled a 5–3–1 record (3–3–1 against MIAC opponents), finished in fourth place in the MIAC, and outscored opponents by a total of 218 to 166.

Date	Opponent	Site	Result	Attendance	Source
September 15	at North Dakota State*	Dacotah Field; Fargo, ND	W 32–13	6,850	
September 22	Hamline	Moorhead, MN	W 34–0		
September 29	at Macalester	St. Paul, MN	W 28–0		
October 6	at St. Thomas	St. Paul, MN	L 8–38		
October 13	St. John's (MN)	Moorhead, MN	L 14–31		
October 20	Augsburg	Moorhead, MN	W 36–24		
October 27	at Gustavus Adolphus	St. Peter, MN	L 22–38		
November 3	at Minnesota Duluth	Duluth, MN	T 8–8		
November 10	Moorhead State*	Moorhead, MN	W 36–14		
*Non-conference game

=== Macalester ===
1962 Macalester Scots football
- Conference: Minnesota Intercollegiate Athletic Conference
- Record: 3–5 (3–4 MIAC)
- Head coach: Ralph McAlister (4th season)

The 1962 Macalester Scots football team represented Macalester College of Saint Paul, Minnesota. In their fourth year under head coach Ralph McAlister, the Scots compiled a 3–5 record (3–4 against MIAC opponents), finished in fifth place in the MIAC, and were outscored by a total of 171 to 144.

Date	Opponent	Site	Result	Attendance	Source
September 15	at Western Illinois*	Macomb, IL	L 18–22		
September 22	St. Thomas (MN)	St. Paul, MN	L 6–20		
September 29	Concordia (MN)	St. Paul, MN	L 0–28		
October 6	at Minnesota Duluth	Duluth, MN	L 10–14		
October 13	Hamline	St. Paul, MN	W 28–18		
October 20	at St. John's (MN)	Collegeville, MN	L 9–43		
October 27	at Augsburg	Minneapolis, MN	W 35–20		
November 3	Gustavus Adolphus	St. Paul, MN	W 38–6		
*Non-conference game

=== Augsburg ===
1962 Augsburg Auggies football
- Conference: Minnesota Intercollegiate Athletic Conference
- Record: 3–5 (2–5 MIAC)
- Head coach: Edor Nelson (16th season)

The 1962 Augsburg Auggies football team represented Augsburg College of Minneapolis, Minnesota. In their 16th year under head coach Edor Nelson, the Auggies compiled a 3–5 record (2–5 against MIAC opponents), finished in sixth place in the MIAC, and were outscored by a total of 207 to 135.

Date	Opponent	Site	Result	Attendance	Source
September 8	at Wisconsin-River Falls*	River Falls, WI	W 7–6		
September 22	Gustavus Adolphus	Minneapolis, MN	W 26–18		
September 29	at Hamline	St. Paul, MN	W 22–6		
October 6	at St. John's (MN)	Collegeville, MN	L 20–36		
October 13	Minneapolis Duluth	Minneapolis, MN	L 8–31		
October 20	at Concordia (MN)	Moorhead, MN	L 24–36		
October 27	at Macalester	Minneapolis, MN	L 20–35		
November 3	St. Thomas	St. Paul, MN	L 8–39		
*Non-conference game

=== Gustavus Adolphus ===
1962 Gustavus Adolphus Golden Gusties football
- Conference: Minnesota Intercollegiate Athletic Conference
- Record: 2–6 (2–5 MIAC)
- Head coach: Don Roberts (2nd season)

The 1962 Gustavus Adolphus Golden Gusties football team represented Gustavus Adolphus College of St. Peter, Minnesota. In their second year under head coach Don Roberts, the Gusties compiled a 2–6 record (2–5 against MIAC opponents), tied for sixth place in the MIAC, and were outscored by a total of 184 to 110.

Date	Opponent	Site	Result	Attendance	Source
September 15	Augustana (SD)	St. Peter, MN	L 0–7		
September 22	at Augsburg	Minneapolis, MN	L 18–26		
September 29	St. John's (MN)	St. Peter, MN	L 8–28		
October 6	at Hamline	St. Paul, MN	W 18–14		
October 13	at St. Thomas (MN)	St. Paul, MN	L 16–27		
October 20	Minnesota Duluth	St. Peter, MN	L 6–22		
October 27	Concordia (MN)	St. Peter, MN	W 38–22		
November 3	at Macalester	St. Paul, MN	L 6–38		

=== Hamline ===
1962 Hamline Pipers football
- Conference: Minnesota Intercollegiate Athletic Conference
- Record: 2–7 (0–7 MIAC)
- Head coach: Dick Mulkern (1st season)

The 1962 Hamline Pipers football team represented Hamline University of Saint Paul, Minnesota. In their first year under head coach Dick Mulkern, the Pipers compiled a 2–7 record (0–7 against MIAC opponents), finished in eighth place in the MIAC, and were outscored by a total of 198 to 63.

Date	Opponent	Site	Result	Attendance	Source
September 15	Yankton*	St. Paul, MN	W 12–6		
September 22	at Concordia (MN)	Moorhead, MN	L 0–34		
September 29	Augsburg	St. Paul, MN	L 6–22		
October 6	Gustavus Adolphus	St. Paul, MN	L 14–18		
October 13	Macalester	St. Paul, MN	L 18–28		
October 20	St. Thomas (MN)	St. Paul, MN	L 0–20		
October 27	at Minnesota Duluth	Duluth, MN	L 7–34		
November 3	St. John's (MN)	St. Paul, MN	L 0–36		
November 10	Westmar*	St. Paul, MN	W 6–0		
*Non-conference game

== All-MIAC team ==
At the end of the season, the conference coaches cast ballots to select the All-MIAC football team. The first-team honorees were:

Offense

- Quarterback - Craig Muyres, St. John's
- Halfbacks - Bob Spinner, St. John's; Paul Bauch, St. Thomas
- Fullback - Ken Schloer, Minnesota-Duluth
- Ends - Ken Roering, St. John's; Jerry Maschka, St. Thomas
- Tackles - Tom McIntyre, St. John's; Bill Drometer, St. Thomas
- Guards - Roger Berg, St. Thomas; Jack McDowell, Minnesota-Duluth
- Center - Bill Wagner, St. John's

Defense

- Ends - Francis Murphy, Minnesota-Duluth; Roger Kohlts, Minnesota-Duluth
- Tackles - John McDowell, St. John's; Tom McIntyre, St. John's
- Guards - Bill Drometer, St. Thomas; Ron Offut, Concordia
- Linebackers - Tom Roberts, St. Thomas; Jerry Wherley, Minnesota-Duluth
- Halfbacks - Jerry Petricka, Minnesota-Duluth; Jon Kerl, Macalester
- Safety - Craig Muyres, St. John's
