= Nate Harlan =

American football player and coach (1927–1985)

Biographical details
- Born: December 4, 1927; Austin, Minnesota, U.S.
- Died: August 19, 1985 (aged 57); Ramsey, Minnesota, U.S.

Playing career

Football
- 1950–1952: Cincinnati
- 1953: Green Bay Packers
- Position: End

Coaching career (HC unless noted)

Football
- 1953: Milan HS
- 1954–1955: Glencoe HS
- 1956–1957: Woodward HS
- 1958–1969: St. Thomas

Harold Nathan Harlan (December 4, 1927 – August 19, 1985) was an American football end and coach. He served as the head coach at the University of St. Thomas from 1958 to 1969. He played college football at Cincinnati and also coached several high school teams.

== Early life and education ==
Harlan was born on December 4, 1927, in Austin, Minnesota. He attended St. Augustine High School, where he earned varsity letters in football, baseball, and basketball. Harlan played college football at Cincinnati, starting at end in 1950, 1951, and 1952. He graduated from Cincinnati in June 1953.

Before attending Cincinnati, Harlan had done undergraduate work at the University of Minnesota and Drake University.

Harlan served in World War II.

== Professional career ==
Harlan was signed by the Green Bay Packers of the National Football League (NFL) in 1953, but was released after an injury.

== Coaching career ==
After being released by Green Bay, Harlan was a coach and taught social studies at Milan High School in Minnesota.

In 1954, Harlan was named head football coach at Glencoe High School, which had gone winless in the past two seasons. In his first year with the team, Glencoe compiled a 3–5 record. Harlan led them to the conference championship in 1955 with a 4–3–1 record. He received "high praise" from the school administration for his efforts.

In 1956, Harlan was hired as head football coach at Woodward High School in Cincinnati, Ohio. He succeeded Ed Biles, who had become the freshman coach at Xavier University. Harlan served as head coach for two seasons.

In 1958, Harlan became the head football coach at the University of St. Thomas, succeeding Frank Deig. Harlan ended up coaching twelve seasons for St. Thomas, before being fired in 1969 after posting a 1–9 record.

== Death ==
Harlan died on August 19, 1985, at the age of 57, following a brief illness.

== Head coaching record ==
=== College football ===
Year	Team	Overall	Conference	Standing	Bowl/playoffs
St. Thomas Tommies (Minnesota Intercollegiate Athletic Conference) (1958–1969)
1958	St. Thomas	4–4	3–4	5th	
1959	St. Thomas	4–3–1	3–3–1	5th	
1960	St. Thomas	2–6	1–6	7th	
1961	St. Thomas	6–3	5–2	T–2nd	
1962	St. Thomas	6–3	5–2	3rd	
1963	St. Thomas	4–5	3–4	T–4th	
1964	St. Thomas	3–6	3–4	5th	
1965	St. Thomas	4–4–1	4–2–1	3rd	
1966	St. Thomas	2–6–1	2–5	7th	
1967	St. Thomas	6–3	4–3	4th	
1968	St. Thomas	2–8	2–5	7th	
1969	St. Thomas	1–9	1–6	7th	
St. Thomas:		44–60–3	36–46–2		
Total:		44–60–3			
