= 1981 Concordia Cobbers football team =

American college football season

1981 Concordia Cobbers football

NAIA Division II national co-champion MIAC champion

NAIA Division II Championship Game, T 24–24 at Austin
- Conference: Minnesota Intercollegiate Athletic Conference
- Record: 11–0–2 (8–0 MIAC)
- Head coach: Jim Christopherson (13th season)
- Home stadium: Jake Christiansen Stadium

1981 Minnesota Intercollegiate Athletic Conference football standings
	Conf.					Overall
Team	W		L		T	W		L		T
No. 1 Concordia–Moorhead $^	8	–	0	–	0	11	–	0	–	2
No. 15 Saint John's (MN)	6	–	2	–	0	7	–	2	–	0
No. 19 St. Thomas (MN)	6	–	2	–	0	7	–	2	–	0
Gustavus Adolphus	5	–	3	–	0	6	–	4	–	0
Augsburg	3	–	5	–	0	4	–	6	–	0
Macalester	2	–	6	–	0	4	–	6	–	0
St. Olaf	2	–	6	–	0	4	–	7	–	0
Bethel (MN)	2	–	6	–	0	3	–	7	–	0
Hamline	2	–	6	–	0	3	–	7	–	0
$ – Conference champion; ^ – NAIA Division II playoff participant; Rankings from NAIA Division II poll

The 1981 Concordia Cobbers football team represented Concordia College (Moorhead, Minnesota) as a member of the Minnesota Intercollegiate Athletic Conference (MIAC) during the 1981 NAIA Division II football season. Led by 13th-year head coach Jim Christopherson, the Cobbers compiled an overall record of 11–0–2 with a mark of 8–0 in conference play, and finished as MIAC champion. Concordia–Moorhead advanced to the NAIA Division II playoffs and tied Austin in the NAIA Division II Championship Game.

== Schedule ==
Date	Opponent	Site	Result	Attendance	Source
September 5	at Wisconsin–Eau Claire*	Carson Park; Eau Claire, WI	W 23–7		
September 12	Moorhead State*	Jake Christiansen Stadium; Moorhead, MN	T 3–3	7,500	
September 26	Hamline	Jake Christiansen Stadium; Moorhead, MN	W 24–6		
October 3	Macalester^{†}	Jake Christiansen Stadium; Moorhead, MN	W 47–0	3,200	
October 10	at Bethel (MN)	Bremer Field; Arden Hills, MN	W 31–17		
October 17	St. Thomas (MN)	Jake Christiansen Stadium; Moorhead, MN	W 17–3		
October 24	at Saint John's (MN)	Saint John's Stadium; Collegeville, MN	W 17–7		
October 31	Augsburg	Jake Christiansen Stadium; Moorhead, MN	W 20–14	2,300	
November 7	at St. Olaf	Northfield, MN	W 42–13		
November 14	at Gustavus Adolphus	St. Peter, MN	W 17–3	3,015	
November 21	Dickinson State*	Jake Christiansen Stadium; Moorhead, MN (NAIA Division II Quarterfinal)	W 13–9		
December 5	at Westminster (PA)*	Memorial Field; New Wilmington, PA (NAIA Division II Quarterfinal)	W 23–17	2,000	
December 12	at Austin*	Louis Calder Stadium; Sherman, TX (NAIA Division II Championship Game)	T 24–24	3,540	
*Non-conference game; ^{†}Homecoming
