= Concordia Cobbers football =

- First season: 1916
- Head coach: Terry Horan; 24th season, 157–87 (.643)
- Location: Moorhead, Minnesota
- Stadium: Jake Christiansen Stadium (capacity: 7,000)
- NCAA division: Division III
- Conference: MIAC
- Colors: Maroon, white, and gold

NAIA national championships
- NAIA: 1964 NAIA Division II: 1978, 1981
- Mascot: Cobbers
- Website: Cobbers Football

The Concordia Cobbers football team represents Concordia College, located in Moorhead, Minnesota, in NCAA Division III college football.

The Cobbers, who began playing football in 1916, compete as members of the Minnesota Intercollegiate Athletic Conference.

Concordia Moorhead have won three national championships, all three at the NAIA level.

== History ==
=== Conferences ===
- 1908–1920: Independent
- 1921–present: Minnesota Intercollegiate Athletic Conference

== Championships ==
=== National championships ===
Year	Association	Division	Head coach	Record	Opponent	Result
1964	NAIA (3)	Single (1)	Jake Christiansen	10–0–1 (7–0 MIAC)	Sam Houston State	T, 7–7
1978	NAIA (3)	Division II (2)	Jim Christopherson	11–1 (7–1 MIAC)	Findlay	W, 7–0
1981	NAIA (3)	Division II (2)	Jim Christopherson	11–0–2 (8–0 MIAC)	Austin	T, 24–24

== Postseason appearances ==
=== NAIA playoffs ===
The Cobbers have made four appearances in the NAIA playoffs, with a combined record of 7–1–2 and three national championships.

Year	Round	Opponent	Result
1964	Semifinals; National Championship	Linfield; Sam Houston State	W, 28–6; T, 7–7
1969	Semifinals; National Championship	Hillsdale; Texas A&I	W, 27–0; L, 7–32
1978	Quarterfinals; Semifinals; National Championship	Northwestern (IA); Linfield; Findlay	W, 49–0; W, 24–23; W, 7–0
1981	Quarterfinals; Semifinals; National Championship	Dickinson State; Westminster (PA); Austin	W, 13–9; W, 23–17; T, 24–24

=== NCAA Division III playoffs ===
The Cobbers have made six appearances in the NCAA Division III playoffs, with a combined record of 4–6.

Year	Round	Opponent	Result
1986	First Round; Quarterfinals; Semifinals	Wisconsin–Stevens Point; Central (IA); Augustana (IL)	W, 24–15; W, 17–14; L, 7–41
1988	First Round	Central (IA)	L, 0–7
1995	First Round	Wisconsin–La Crosse	L, 7–45
1997	First Round	Augsburg	L, 22–34
2004	First Round; Second Round	Wartburg; Occidental	W, 28–14; L, 40–42
2005	First Round; Second Round	Coe; Linfield	W, 27–14; L, 14–28
