= Tom W. Currie =

American football player (1879–1943)

Biographical details
- Born: January 23, 1879; Durango, Texas, U.S.
- Died: April 22, 1943 (aged 64); Temple, Texas, U.S.

Playing career
- 1903–1906: Austin

Coaching career (HC unless noted)
- 1907: Austin

Head coaching record
- Overall: 0–6–1

Thomas White Currie Sr. (January 23, 1879 – April 22, 1943) was an American pastor, college president, and college football coach. He served as the head football coach at Austin College in Sherman, Texas in 1907. After coaching and teaching at Austin College for a short time, he earned a master's degree in history from the University of Texas at Austin in 1911 and seminary training at Austin Presbyterian Theological Seminary, the latter of which he served as president from 1922 until his death in 1943.

Currie was born on January 23, 1879, in Durango, Texas, to David Mitchell and Ira Ione White Currie. He died on April 22, 1943, at a hospital in Temple, Texas, after suffering a paralytic stroke a week prior.

== Head coaching record ==
Year	Team	Overall	Conference	Standing	Bowl/playoffs
Austin Kangaroos (Independent) (1907)
1907	Austin	0–6–1			
Austin:		0–6–1			
Total:		0–6–1			
