= Edor Nelson =

American athlete and coach

Biographical details
- Born: August 18, 1914; Dawson, Minnesota, U.S.
- Died: August 27, 2014 (aged 100); Minnesota, U.S.

Playing career

Football
- c. 1937: Augsburg
- 1941–1943: Fort Riley

Basketball
- c. 1937: Augsburg

Baseball
- c. 1937: Augsburg
- Position: Forward (basketball)

Coaching career (HC unless noted)

Football
- 1946: Augsburg (assistant)
- 1947–1969: Augsburg

Baseball
- 1946–1979: Augsburg

Men's ice hockey
- 1956–1957: Augsburg

Wrestling
- 1949–1963: Augsburg

Head coaching record
- Overall: 55–120–9 (football)

Edor "Red" Nelson (August 18, 1914 – August 27, 2014) was an athlete and sports coach at Augsburg College—now known as Augsburg University–in Minneapolis. He played baseball, football, and basketball at Augsburg before graduating in 1938. He returned to Augsburg as a coach, serving as head coach of the baseball team from 1946 to 1979, the football team from 1947 to 1969, the wrestling team from 1949 to 1963, and the men's ice hockey team during the 1956–57 season. He also served in the United States Army during World War II and served several months in German prisoner-of-war camps before escaping. After the war, he received a master's degree from the University of Minnesota in 1947. He was inducted into the Augsburg Athletics Hall of Fame in 1975. Augsburg's athletic field, Edor Nelson Field, is named in Nelson's honor.

== Head coaching record ==
=== Football ===
Year	Team	Overall	Conference	Standing	Bowl/playoffs
Augsburg Auggies (Minnesota Intercollegiate Athletic Conference) (1947–1969)
1947	Augsburg	0–7	0–5	9th	
1948	Augsburg	1–3–2	0–3–2	7th	
1949	Augsburg	2–3–2	1–3–1	8th	
1950	Augsburg	1–5–1	1–5	9th	
1951	Augsburg	0–7	0–6	T–9th	
1952	Augsburg	3–5	2–4	7th	
1953	Augsburg	2–6	1–5	8th	
1954	Augsburg	1–7	0–6	T–8th	
1955	Augsburg	4–4	3–3	T–5th	
1956	Augsburg	2–5–1	2–4–1	T–6th	
1957	Augsburg	4–4	3–4	5th	
1958	Augsburg	0–8	0–7	8th	
1959	Augsburg	3–5	2–5	6th	
1960	Augsburg	5–3	4–3	4th	
1961	Augsburg	4–4	3–4	T–5th	
1962	Augsburg	3–5	2–5	T–6th	
1963	Augsburg	4–3–1	4–3	3rd	
1964	Augsburg	6–3	5–2	2nd	
1965	Augsburg	3–5–1	2–4–1	6th	
1966	Augsburg	4–4–1	3–4	6th	
1967	Augsburg	1–8	0–7	8th	
1968	Augsburg	1–8	0–7	8th	
1969	Augsburg	1–8	0–7	8th	
Augsburg:		55–120–9	38–106–6		
Total:		55–120–9			
