= 1978 Concordia Cobbers football team =

American college football season

1978 Concordia Cobbers football

NAIA Division II national champion MIAC co-champion

NAIA Division II Championship Game, W 7–0 at Findlay
- Conference: Minnesota Intercollegiate Athletic Conference
- Record: 11–1 (7–1 MIAC)
- Head coach: Jim Christopherson (10th season)
- Home stadium: Jake Christiansen Stadium

1978 Minnesota Intercollegiate Athletic Conference football standings
	Conf.					Overall
Team	W		L		T	W		L		T
No. 1 Concordia–Moorhead * +	7	–	1	–	0	11	–	1	–	0
St. Olaf +^	7	–	1	–	0	9	–	2	–	0
No. 15 Gustavus Adolphus	6	–	2	–	0	8	–	2	–	0
No. T–20 Saint John's (MN)	5	–	3	–	0	6	–	3	–	0
St. Thomas (MN)	4	–	4	–	0	5	–	4	–	0
Hamline	3	–	4	–	1	5	–	4	–	1
Augsburg	2	–	5	–	1	3	–	6	–	1
Bethel (MN)	1	–	7	–	0	2	–	8	–	0
Macalester	0	–	8	–	0	0	–	9	–	0
+ – Conference co-champions; ^ – NCAA Division III playoff participant; * – NAIA Division II playoff participant; Rankings from NAIA Division II poll

The 1978 Concordia Cobbers football team represented Concordia College (Moorhead, Minnesota) as a member of the Minnesota Intercollegiate Athletic Conference (MIAC) during the 1978 NAIA Division II football season. Led by tenth-year head coach Jim Christopherson, the Cobbers compiled an overall record of 11–1 with a mark of 7–1 in conference play, and finished as MIAC co-champion. Concordia–Moorhead advanced to the NAIA Division II playoffs and defeated Findlay in the NAIA Division II Championship Game.

== Schedule ==
Date	Opponent	Site	Result	Attendance	Source
September 9	at Moorhead State*	Alex Nemzek Stadium; Moorhead, MN	W 10–0	6,500	
September 16	at Augsburg	Parade Stadium; Minneapolis, MN	W 54–0		
September 23	St. Olaf	Jake Christiansen Stadium; Moorhead, MN	L 17–26		
September 30	Macalester	Jake Christiansen Stadium; Moorhead, MN	W 62–7		
October 14	Hamline	Jake Christiansen Stadium; Moorhead, MN	W 31–13		
October 21	at St. Thomas (MN)	O'Shaughnessy Stadium; Saint Paul, MN	W 14–0		
October 28	Gustavus Adolphus	Jake Christiansen Stadium; Moorhead, MN	W 31–7		
November 4	at Saint John's (MN)	Saint John's Stadium; Collegeville, MN	W 17–0		
November 11	at Bethel (MN)	Bremer Field; Arden Hills, MN	W 31–3		
November 18	Northwestern (IA)*	Jake Christiansen Stadium; Moorhead, MN (NAIA Division II Quarterfinal)	W 49–0		
December 2	at Linfield*	Maxwell Field; McMinnville, OR (NAIA Division II Quarterfinal)	W 24–23	4,000	
December 9	at Findlay*	Donnell Stadium; Findlay, OH (NAIA Division II Championship Game)	W 7–0		
*Non-conference game
