= Jake Christiansen (coach) =

American football and basketball player and coach (1900–1992)

Biographical details
- Born: February 2, 1900; Marinette, Wisconsin, U.S.
- Died: January 21, 1992 (aged 91); Cass County, North Dakota, U.S.

Coaching career (HC unless noted)

Football
- 1929–1940: Valparaiso
- 1941–1968: Concordia (MN)

Basketball
- 1929–1941: Valparaiso
- 1941–1953: Concordia (MN)

Baseball
- 1930–1931: Valparaiso

Administrative career (AD unless noted)
- 1929–1941: Valparaiso

Head coaching record
- Overall: 175–92–15 (football); 224–236–2 (basketball); 15–8 (baseball)
- Tournaments: Football; 1–0–1 (NAIA playoffs)

Accomplishments and honors

Championships
- Football; NAIA National (1964); 4 MIAC (1942, 1952, 1957, 1964).

Awards
- NAIA Coach of the Year (1964)

Jacobi Melius Alton Christiansen (February 2, 1900 – January 21, 1992) was an American football and basketball player and coach. He served as the head football coach at Valparaiso University from 1929 to 1940 and at Concordia College in Moorhead, Minnesota from 1941 to 1968, compiling a career college football record of 175–92–15. Christiansen's 1964 Concordia team tied with Sam Houston State in the NAIA National title game. Christiansen is one of the few college football coaches to have coached in a stadium named after himself.

== Playing career ==
Christiansen was born in Marinette, Wisconsin and grew up in Northfield, Minnesota where his father F. Melius Christiansen was conductor of the St. Olaf College Choir. Christiansen had musical talent but was also a standout athlete in college. He graduated from St. Olaf in 1924 with a bachelor's degree in physical education. He later earned a master's degree in education and counseling from North Dakota State University.

His younger brothers led major college choral programs in the twentieth century: Olaf C. Christiansen at St. Olaf College in Northfield, Minnesota, and Paul J. Christiansen at Concordia College in Moorhead, Minnesota.

== Coaching career ==
=== Valparaiso ===
Christiansen was the head football coach for the Valparaiso University in Valparaiso, Indiana for 12 seasons, from 1929 until 1940. His football coaching record at Valparaiso was 50–43–4. His 1932 team completed the season undefeated.

Christiansen was called "A remarkable one-man athletics department" at Valparasio. He served as football coach, basketball coach, and athletic director from 1929 through 1941. His basketball team of 1938 won the Indiana Intercollegiate title and went on to play in the National Tournament in Kansas City, Missouri. Valparaiso inducted him into their "Athletic Hall of Fame" in 1998.

=== Concordia (Minnesota) ===
Christiansen moved to Concordia College in Moorhead, Minnesota to coach basketball from the 1941–42 to 1952–53 seasons. He also coached football for the school from 1941 to 1968.

In fall 1964, Christiansen was named MIAC Coach of the Year, NAIA Coach of the Year and inducted into the NAIA Hall of Fame. That same year the construction of a new football stadium was announced. After its completion in 1966, it was dedicated as the Jake Christiansen Stadium. He was inducted into the Concordia Athletic Hall of Fame in 1986.

== Head coaching record ==
=== Football ===
Year	Team	Overall	Conference	Standing	Bowl/playoffs
Valparaiso Crusaders (Indiana Intercollegiate Conference) (1929–1940)
1929	Valparaiso	1–7			
1930	Valparaiso	5–4			
1931	Valparaiso	8–1			
1932	Valparaiso	7–0			
1933	Valparaiso	7–1	3–0	2nd	
1934	Valparaiso	6–2	4–1	T–3rd	
1935	Valparaiso	4–4–1	2–2	7th	
1936	Valparaiso	1–6–1	1–3–1	T–11th	
1937	Valparaiso	4–4	4–2	T–5th	
1938	Valparaiso	2–4–1	2–2–1	8th	
1939	Valparaiso	2–6	1–3	T–10th	
1940	Valparaiso	3–4–1	2–3	T–9th	
Valparaiso:		50–43–4			
Concordia Cobbers (Minnesota Intercollegiate Athletic Conference) (1941–1968)
1941	Concordia	5–2	3–2	3rd	
1942	Concordia	6–0–1	3–0–1	T–1st	
1943	Concordia	3–1	NA	NA	
1944	Concordia	1–2–1	NA	NA	
1945	Concordia	2–2–2	0–1	T–6th	
1946	Concordia	3–3–1	2–2	4th	
1947	Concordia	3–4	1–4	7th	
1948	Concordia	3–4–1	0–4–1	8th	
1949	Concordia	3–6	2–3	5th	
1950	Concordia	3–4	2–4	8th	
1951	Concordia	4–4	2–4	7th	
1952	Concordia	7–2	6–0	T–1st	
1953	Concordia	5–3	4–2	3rd	
1954	Concordia	6–1–1	5–1	2nd	
1955	Concordia	6–2	4–2	2nd	
1956	Concordia	6–3	5–2	2nd	
1957	Concordia	7–2	6–1	1st	
1958	Concordia	7–2	6–1	2nd	
1959	Concordia	7–2	6–1	2nd	
1960	Concordia	7–2	5–2	2nd	
1961	Concordia	4–5	3–4	5th	
1962	Concordia	5–3–1	3–3–1	4th	
1963	Concordia	7–2	6–1	2nd	
1964	Concordia	10–0–1	7–0	1st	T NAIA Championship
1965	Concordia	6–2	5–2	2nd	
1966	Concordia	5–3	4–3	4th	
1967	Concordia	7–1–1	5–1–1	T–2nd	
1968	Concordia	7–3	4–3	3rd	
Concordia:		145–70–10	99–53–4		
Total:		175–92–15			
National championship Conference title Conference division title or championship game berth
