= 1961 Minnesota–Duluth Bulldogs football team =

American college football season

1961 Minnesota–Duluth Bulldogs football

MIAC champion
- Conference: Minnesota Intercollegiate Athletic Conference
- Record: 8–1 (7–0 MIAC)
- Head coach: Jim Malosky (4th season)

1961 Minnesota Intercollegiate Athletic Conference football standings
	Conf.					Overall
Team	W		L		T	W		L		T
No. 18 Minnesota–Duluth $	7	–	0	–	0	8	–	1	–	0
Saint John's (MN)	5	–	2	–	0	6	–	2	–	0
St. Thomas (MN)	5	–	2	–	0	6	–	3	–	0
Macalester	4	–	3	–	0	6	–	3	–	0
Augsburg	3	–	4	–	0	4	–	4	–	0
Concordia (MN)	3	–	4	–	0	4	–	5	–	0
Gustavus Adolphus	1	–	6	–	0	2	–	7	–	0
Hamline	0	–	7	–	0	1	–	7	–	0
$ – Conference champion; Rankings from NAIA poll

The 1961 Minnesota–Duluth Bulldogs football team was an American football team that represented the University of Minnesota Duluth as a member of the Minnesota Intercollegiate Athletic Conference (MIAC) during the 1961 college football season. In their fourth year under head coach Jim Malosky, the Bulldogs compiled an 8–1 record (7–0 in conference games), won the MIAC championship, and outscored opponents by a total of 356 to 112.

The team scored 70 points against Gustavus Adolphus, breaking the Duluth single-game scoring record of 61 points set one year earlier against St Thomas. One week later, Minnesota-Duluth added 61 points against Hamline. Over the course of nine games, the team averaged 39.4 points per game, the second highest average in the National Collegiate Athletic Association (NCAA) behind Florida A&M.

Over the course of nine games, the Bulldogs tallied 3,268 yards of total offense (363 yards per game), consisting of 2,247 rushing yards and 1,021 passing yards. On defense they gave up 1,585 yards of total offense (176 yards per game).

Halfback John Nachtsheim ranked third in the NAIA with 112 points scored on 17 touchdowns and five two-point conversions. The team's leading rushers were Nachtsheim (689 yards on 129 carries) and Bruce Johnson (674 yards on 110 carries). Quarterback Ed Lundstrom led the team in both passing yards (870) and total offense (1,107 yards).

Minnesota-Duluth players took five first-team spots on the 1961 NAIA All-District 13 football team: John Nachtsheim are left halfback (offense); Ed Lundstrom at quarterback (offense); Tom Adams at left end (offense); Ron Kosteliz at left tackle (offense and defense).

== Schedule ==
Date	Opponent	Site	Result	Attendance	Source
September 9	Superior State*	Duluth, MN	W 43–6	3,901	
September 16	at Northern Michigan*	Memorial Stadium; Marquette, MI	L 6–35	5,000	
September 23	at St. Thomas (MN)	O'Shaugnessy Field; Saint Paul, MN	W 36–13	4,000	
September 30	at Macalester	Saint Paul, MN	W 47–13	1,500	
October 7	Augsburg	Duluth, MN	W 47–25	3,130	
October 14	Gustavus Adolphus	Duluth, MN	W 70–0	3,235	
October 21	at Hamline	Norton Field; Saint Paul, MN	W 61–0	1,500	
October 28	at Concordia (MN)	Moorhead, MN	W 34–14	1,000	
November 4	Saint John's (MN)	Duluth, MN	W 12–6	3,665	
*Non-conference game
