= Ralph McAlister =

American gridiron football player and coach (1928–2003)

Profile
- Position: Halfback

Personal information
- Born: October 13, 1928; Wichita, Kansas, U.S.
- Died: August 13, 2003 (aged 74); Columbia, South Carolina, U.S.
- Listed height: 6 ft 2 in (1.88 m)
- Listed weight: 205 lb (93 kg)

Career information
- College: Minnesota

Career history

Playing
- 1952–1953: Winnipeg Blue Bombers

Coaching
- 1959–1963: Macalester
- 1964–1969: North Central

Ralph Dixon McAlister (October 13, 1928 – August 13, 2003) was an American gridiron football player and coach. He played college football at the University of Minnesota and professionally in Canadian football for the Winnipeg Blue Bombers. McAlister was drafted by the Detroit Lions in the eighth round of the 1950 NFL draft. He served as the head football coach at Macalester College in Saint Paul, Minnesota from 1959 to 1963 and North Central College in Naperville, Illinois from 1964 to 1969.

McAlister also coached track and swimming at Macalester. He resigned in 1964 to become head football coach at athletic director at North Central.

== Head coaching record ==
Year	Team	Overall	Conference	Standing	Bowl/playoffs
Macalester Scots (Minnesota Intercollegiate Athletic Conference) (1959–1963)
1959	Macalester	2–6	1–6	7th	
1960	Macalester	7–2	5–2	T–2nd	
1961	Macalester	6–3	4–3	4th	
1962	Macalester	3–5	3–4	5th	
1963	Macalester	1–8	0–7	8th	
Macalester:		19–24	13–22		
North Central Cardinals (College Conference of Illinois / College Conference of Illinois and Wisconsin) (1964–1968)
1964	North Central	4–3–1	2–3–1	T–4th	
1965	North Central	5–3	3–3	3rd	
1966	North Central	6–3	4–2	T–2nd	
1967	North Central	2–7	1–5	T–5th	
1968	North Central	1–8	1–6	7th	
1969	North Central	0–9	0–7	8th	
North Central:		18–33–1	11–26–1		
Total:		37–57–1			
