= American Leadership Academy =

Charter high school system headquartered in Arizona

Address
- 6913 E. Rembrandt Ave. Mesa, Arizona, Maricopa County, Arizona, 85212; United States

District information
- Type: Public Charter School System
- Grades: Pre-K-12
- Established: 2009 (17 years ago)
- School board: Brandon Clarke, Treasurer Peter Evans, Director Kacey Hammar, Secretary
- Governing agency: Arizona State Board for Charter Schools
- District ID: charter.one

Students and staff
- Enrollment: 10,500+
- Athletic conference: AIA, CAA
- District mascot: Patriots, Warriors, Eagles, Falcons, Pathfinders, Mavericks
- Colors: Red, White, Blue

Other information
- Website: www.alaschools.org

American Leadership Academy (ALA) is a regional group of tuition-free public charter schools headquartered in Mesa, Arizona which provides education for Pre-K-12 students. ALA currently consists of over 30 schools located in Arizona, North Carolina, and South Carolina; as of the 2019–2020 school year, enrollment exceeded 10,500 students.

ALA's current district needs are fulfilled by Charter One, an education management organization, which was founded in 2018. Charter One is currently owned by SGW Holdings, LLC.

== History ==
American Leadership Academy, Inc. was founded by Ryan Christensen and Glenn Way in 2009.

ALA's first school was its Gilbert Elementary location, and it opened in 2009.
