= 1980 Minnesota–Duluth Bulldogs football team =

American college football season

1980 Minnesota–Duluth Bulldogs football

NIC champion
- Conference: Northern Intercollegiate Conference
- Record: 10–0 (8–0 NIC)
- Head coach: Jim Malosky (23rd season)

1980 Northern Intercollegiate Conference football standings
	Conf.					Overall
Team	W		L		T	W		L		T
Minnesota Duluth $	8	–	0	–	0	10	–	0	–	0
Minnesota Morris ^	7	–	1	–	0	9	–	2	–	1
No. 11 Moorhead State	6	–	2	–	0	8	–	2	–	0
St. Cloud State	5	–	3	–	0	6	–	4	–	0
Mankato State	3	–	5	–	0	3	–	7	–	0
Southwest State (MN)	2	–	5	–	1	3	–	6	–	1
Winona State	2	–	6	–	0	3	–	7	–	0
Northern State	1	–	6	–	1	2	–	7	–	1
Bemidji State	1	–	7	–	0	1	–	9	–	0
$ – Conference champion; ^ – NCAA Division III playoff participant; Rankings from NAIA Division I poll

The 1980 Minnesota–Duluth Bulldogs football team was an American football team that represented the University of Minnesota Duluth (UMD) as a member of the Northern Intercollegiate Conference during the 1980 NCAA Division II football season. In its 23rd year under head coach Jim Malosky, UMD compiled a 10–0 record (8–0 in NIC games) and won the NIC championship. It was the first perfect season in the history of the UMD football program and its first outright conference championship since 1938.

UMD led Division II in both scoring offense and scoring defense and was one of only two undefeated and untied teams in Division II at the end of the 1980 season. Despite their accomplishments, the Bulldogs' strength of schedule was considered weak, and they were ranked No. 9 in the final Division II rankings and did not participate in the eight-team Division II playoffs.

Running back Amory Bodin was the team captain and won the team's James Overlie MVP Award. He led the team in both rushing yards (1,057) and points scored (116). He was inducted into the University of Minnesota Duluth Athletic Hall of Fame in 2014.

Offensive tackle Mike Thomas won the Glen Johnson Lineman Award and was selected as a third-team player on the Associated Press 1980 Little All-America team. Six UMD players were selected as first-team players on the 1980 All-NIC team: Bodin; Thomas; running back Tom Stoll; defensive end Craig Nasvik; defensive back Tom Lawrence; and center Tom Swanson.

The team employed a run-oriented offense, gaining 3,073 rushing yards on 613 rushing attempts. The team also completed 51 of 104 passes for 1,002 passing yards.

== Schedule ==
Date	Opponent	Site	Result	Attendance	Source
September 6	at Wisconsin–Superior*	Superior, WI	W 49–0	5,000	
September 13	at Minnesota Morris	Morris, MN	W 24–21	3,000	
September 20	Mankato State	Duluth, MN	W 38-6	4,067	
September 27	at Northwestern (IA)*	Orange City, IA	W 24–7	3,000	
October 4	at Southwest State (MN)	Marshall, MN	W 28–7	1,200	
October 11	St. Cloud State	Duluth, MN	W 35–12	4,035	
October 18	at Bemidji State	Bemidji, MN	W 55–7	1,000	
October 25	Winona State	Duluth, MN	W 38–0	1,983	
November 1	at Moorhead State	Moorhead, MN	W 32–9	4,600	
November 8	Northern State	Duluth, MN	W 31–7	856	
*Non-conference game

== Coaching staff and administration ==
- Head coach - Jim Malosky
- Athletic director - Ralph Romano
- Assistant coaches - Neil Ladsten (defensive line), Scott Hanna (offensive line), Brian Bloomquist (defensive backs), Dave Kent (offensive line)
