= Austin Kangaroos football =

College football team

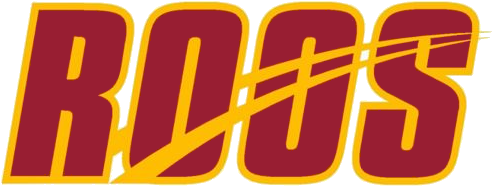
- First season: 1898; 128 years ago
- Athletic director: David Norman
- Head coach: Tony Joe White; 3rd season, 3–17 (.150)
- Location: Sherman, Texas
- Stadium: Apple Stadium (capacity: 2,500)
- NCAA division: Division III
- Conference: SCAC
- Colors: Crimson and gold
- All-time record: 354–446–29 (.445)

NAIA national championships
- NAIA Division II: 1981

Conference championships
- 7
- Rivalries: Southwestern
- Mascot: Kangaroos
- Website: austin.prestosports.com/football

The Austin Kangaroos football team represents Austin College in college football at the NCAA Division III level. The Kangaroos are members of the Southern Collegiate Athletic Conference (SCAC), fielding its team in the SCAC since 2024. The Kangaroos play their home games at Apple Stadium in Sherman, Texas. The team is also known as the Austin Roos.

Their head coach is Tony Joe White, who took over the position for the 2023 season.

== Conference affiliations ==
- Independent (1898; 1900–1905; 1907–1908; 1954–1972; 2012)
- Texas Intercollegiate Athletic Association (1909–1925)
- Texas Conference (1926–1953)
- NAIA independent (1973–1975)
- Texas Intercollegiate Athletic Association (1976–1995)
- American Southwest Conference (1996–2005; 2021–2023)
- Southern Collegiate Athletic Conference (2006–2011; 2013–2016; 2024–present)
- Southern Athletic Association (2016–2020)

== List of head coaches ==
=== Key ===
Key to symbols in coaches list
General		Overall		Conference		Postseason (Note: Although the first Rose Bowl Game was played in 1902, it has been continuously played since the 1916 game, and is recognized as the oldest bowl game by the NCAA. "—" indicates any season prior to 1916 when postseason games were not played.)	
No.	Order of coaches (Note: A running total of the number of head coaches, with coaches who served separate tenures being counted only once. Interim head coaches are represented with "Int" and are not counted in the running total. "—" indicates the team played but either without a coach or no coach is on record. "X" indicates an interim year without play.)	GC	Games coached	CW	Conference wins	PW	Postseason wins
DC	Division championships	OW	Overall wins	CL	Conference losses	PL	Postseason losses
CC	Conference championships	OL	Overall losses	CT	Conference ties	PT	Postseason ties
NC	National championships	OT	Overall ties (Note: Overtime rules in college football were introduced in 1996, making ties impossible in the period since.)	C%	Conference winning percentage		
†	Elected to the College Football Hall of Fame	O%	Overall winning percentage (Note: When computing the win–loss percentage, a tie counts as half a win and half a loss.)				

=== Coaches ===
List of head football coaches showing season(s) coached, overall records, conference records, postseason records, and championships
No.	Name	Season(s)	GC	OW	OL	OT	O%	CW	CL	CT	C%	PW	PL	PT	DC	CC
1	no coach	1898; 1900	–	–	–	–	–	–	–	–	–	–	–	–	–	–
2	R. N. Watts	1901	–	–	–	–	–	–	–	–	–	–	–	–	–	–
3	James Washington Culver (and J. M. Frick in 1902)	1902–1905	–	–	–	–	–	–	–	–	–	–	–	–	–	–
4	Tom W. Currie	1907	7	0	6	1	0.071	–	–	–	–	–	–	–	–	–
5	Charles A. Richenstein	1908	–	–	–	–	–	–	–	–	–	–	–	–	–	–
6	J. Burton Rix	1909–1910	19	9	6	4	0.579	–	–	–	–	–	–	–	–	–
7	Chester Johnson	1911–1914	–	–	–	–	–	–	–	–	–	–	–	–	–	–
8	J. W. Jones	1915	9	3	4	2	0.444	–	–	–	–	–	–	–	–	–
9	Webster H. Warren	1916	–	–	–	–	–	–	–	–	–	–	–	–	–	–
10	C. A. Clingenpeel	1917	7	0	7	0	.000	–	–	–	–	–	–	–	–	–
11	Roy K. McCall	1918	–	–	–	–	–	–	–	–	–	–	–	–	–	–
12	Ewing Y. Freeland	1919–1920; 1936–1938	47	24	20	3	0.543	11	8	0	0.579	–	–	–	–	1
13	Eugene Neely	1921	9	5	4	0	0.556	–	–	–	–	–	–	–	–	–
14	Raymond Morehart, Dave Pena, and Charles Robertson	1922; 1933 (Morehart)	–	–	–	–	–	–	–	–	–	–	–	–	–	–
15	Pete Cawthon	1923–1927	45	23	18	4	0.556	9	9	3	0.500	–	–	–	–	–
16	Cecil Grigg	1928–1932	46	13	31	2	0.304	10	12	1	0.457	–	–	–	–	–
17	Joseph B. Head	1934	–	–	–	–	–	–	–	–	–	–	–	–	–	–
18	Bill Pierce	1935; 1947–1948	31	11	17	3	0.403	6	8	2	0.438	–	–	–	–	1
19	Garvice Steen	1939–1941; 1946	–	–	–	–	–	–	–	–	–	–	–	–	–	–
20	unknown	1942–1945	–	–	–	–	–	–	–	–	–	–	–	–	–	–
21	Ray Morrison	1949–1952	37	11	26	0	0.297	4	14	0	0.222	–	–	–	–	–
22	Harry Buffington	1953–1954	–	–	–	–	–	–	–	–	–	–	–	–	–	–
23	Joe Spencer	1955–1960	–	–	–	–	–	–	–	–	–	–	–	–	–	–
24	Floyd Gass	1961–1968	72	43	28	1	0.604	–	–	–	–	–	–	–	–	–
25	Duane Nutt	1969–1972	–	–	–	–	–	–	–	–	–	–	–	–	–	–
26	Larry Kramer	1973–1982	99	50	44	5	0.530	33	18	1	0.644	3	1	1	–	2
27	Stan McGarvey	1983	10	6	4	0	0.600	3	3	0	0.500	–	–	–	–	–
28	Mel Tjeerdsma	1984–1993	102	59	39	4	0.598	30	22	4	0.571	0	2	0	–	3
29	David Norman	1994–2005	118	43	75	0	0.364	35	54	0	0.393	–	–	–	–	–
30	Ronnie Gage	2006–2009	39	17	22	0	0.436	9	17	0	0.346	–	–	–	–	–
31	Loren Dawson	2010–2022	132	37	95	0	0.280	17	55	0	0.236	–	–	–	–	–
32	Tony Joe White	2023–present	–	–	–	–	–	–	–	–	–	–	–	–	–	–

== Year-by-year results since 1973 ==
National champions	Conference champions	Bowl game berth	Playoff berth

Season	Year	Head coach	Association	Division	Conference	Record							Postseason
Season	Year	Head coach	Association	Division	Conference	Overall			Conference				Postseason
Season	Year	Head coach	Association	Division	Conference	Win	Loss	Tie	Finish	Win	Loss	Tie	Postseason
Austin Kangaroos
1973	1973	Larry Kramer	NAIA	Division II	Independent	3	5	1					
1974	1974	Larry Kramer	NAIA	Division II	Independent	2	6	1					
1975	1975	Larry Kramer	NAIA	Division II	Independent	3	5	1					
1976	1976	Larry Kramer	NAIA	Division II	TIAA	3	7	0	5th	0	4	0	
1977	1977	Larry Kramer	NAIA	Division II	TIAA	1	8	0	4th	1	3	0	
1978	1978	Larry Kramer	NAIA	Division II	TIAA	3	6	1	4th	2	5	1	
1979	1979	Larry Kramer	NAIA	Division II	TIAA	9	2	0	1st	7	1	0	L NAIA Division II Quarterfinal
1980	1980	Larry Kramer	NAIA	Division II	TIAA	8	2	0	2nd	8	2	0	
1981	1981	Larry Kramer	NAIA	Division II	TIAA	11	1	1	T–1st	9	1	0	T NAIA Division II Championship
1982	1982	Larry Kramer	NAIA	Division II	TIAA	7	2	0	2nd	6	2	0	
1983	1983	Stan McGarvey	NAIA	Division II	TIAA	6	4	0	3rd	3	3	0	
1984	1984	Mel Tjeerdsma	NAIA	Division II	TIAA	5	4	1	1st	4	4	1	Conference champion
1985	1985	Mel Tjeerdsma	NAIA	Division II	TIAA	7	3	0	T–1st	4	2	0	Conference co-champion
1986	1986	Mel Tjeerdsma	NAIA	Division II	TIAA	6	4	0	T–2nd	2	4	0	
1987	1987	Mel Tjeerdsma	NAIA	Division II	TIAA	2	5	3	4th	0	4	2	
1988	1988	Mel Tjeerdsma	NAIA	Division II	TIAA	9	2	0	1st	9	1	0	L NAIA Division II First Round
1989	1989	Mel Tjeerdsma	NAIA	Division II	TIAA	6	4	0					
1990	1990	Mel Tjeerdsma	NAIA	Division II	TIAA	8	3	0	2nd	4	2	0	L NAIA Division II First Round
1991	1991	Mel Tjeerdsma	NAIA	Division II	TIAA	6	4	0	T–2nd	3	2	0	
1992	1992	Mel Tjeerdsma	NAIA	Division II	TIAA	6	4	0	T–3rd	2	3	0	
1993	1993	Mel Tjeerdsma	NAIA	Division II	TIAA	4	6	0	T–3rd	2	3	0	
1994	1994	David Norman	NAIA	Division II	TIAA	4	6	0	4th	2	3	0	
1995	1995	David Norman	NAIA	Division II	TIAA	4	5	0	3rd	4	4	0	
1996	1996	David Norman	NAIA	Division II	ASC	3	7	0	T–4th	1	3	0	
1997	1997	David Norman	NCAA	Division III	ASC	4	6	0	T–3rd	2	3	0	
1998	1998	David Norman	NCAA	Division III	ASC	4	6	0	4th	4	3	0	
1999	1999	David Norman	NCAA	Division III	ASC	3	7	0	T–6th	2	5	0	
2000	2000	David Norman	NCAA	Division III	ASC	7	3	0	T–3rd	6	3	0	
2001	2001	David Norman	NCAA	Division III	ASC	3	6	0	6th	3	5	0	
2002	2002	David Norman	NCAA	Division III	ASC	4	6	0	T–5th	4	5	0	
2003	2003	David Norman	NCAA	Division III	ASC	3	7	0	7th	3	6	0	
2004	2004	David Norman	NCAA	Division III	ASC	3	7	0	7th	3	6	0	
2005	2005	David Norman	NCAA	Division III	ASC	1	9	0	T–9th	1	8	0	
2006	2006	Ronnie Gage	NCAA	Division III	SCAC	4	6	0	T–5th	2	4	0	
2007	2007	Ronnie Gage	NCAA	Division III	SCAC	4	6	0	6th	2	5	0	
2008	2008	Ronnie Gage	NCAA	Division III	SCAC	5	5	0	5th	3	4	0	
2009	2009	Ronnie Gage	NCAA	Division III	SCAC	4	5	0	5th	2	4	0	
2010	2010	Loren Dawson	NCAA	Division III	SCAC	4	5	0	T–5th	2	4	0	
2011	2011	Loren Dawson	NCAA	Division III	SCAC	0	10	0	8th	0	6	0	
2012	2012	Loren Dawson	NCAA	Division III	Independent	2	8	0					
2013	2013	Loren Dawson	NCAA	Division III	SCAC	5	5	0	2nd	2	1	0	
2014	2014	Loren Dawson	NCAA	Division III	SCAC	5	5	0	3rd	1	2	0	
2015	2015	Loren Dawson	NCAA	Division III	SCAC	5	5	0	3rd	1	2	0	
2016	2016	Loren Dawson	NCAA	Division III	SCAC	3	7	0	4th	1	5	0	
2017	2017	Loren Dawson	NCAA	Division III	SAA	3	7	0	9th	1	7	0	
2018	2018	Loren Dawson	NCAA	Division III	SAA	2	8	0	9th	2	6	0	
2019	2019	Loren Dawson	NCAA	Division III	SAA	5	5	0	5th	4	4	0	
2020–21	2020–21	Loren Dawson	NCAA	Division III	SAA	1	3	0	T–6th	1	3	0	
2021	2021	Loren Dawson	NCAA	Division III	ASC	1	8	0	10th	1	8	0	
2022	2022	Loren Dawson	NCAA	Division III	ASC	1	9	0	T–8th	1	7	0	
2023	2023	Tony Joe White	NCAA	Division III	ASC	1	9	0	T-6th	0	5	0	
