= David Norman (American football) =

American football coach (born c. 1961)

Biographical details
- Born: c. 1961 (age 64–65)
- Education: Austin College (1983, 1984)

Playing career
- 1979–1982: Austin

Coaching career (HC unless noted)

Football
- 1984–1988: Denison HS (TX) (assistant)
- 1989–1993: Austin (OC)
- 1994–2005: Austin

Baseball
- 1989–?: Austin

Track and field
- 1984–1988: Denison HS (TX)

Cross country
- 2013: Austin

Administrative career (AD unless noted)
- 1994–2006: Austin (assistant AD)
- 2006–2010: Austin (associate AD)
- 2010–2025: Austin

Head coaching record
- Overall: 43–75 (college football)

David Norman (born c. 1961) is an American former college administrator and coach. He was the athletic director for Austin College from 2010 to 2025. He was the head football coach for Austin from 1994 to 2005. He also coached Austin's baseball and cross country teams. He also coached for Denison High School's football and track and field teams. He played college football for Austin.

== Head coaching record ==
=== College football ===
Year	Team	Overall	Conference	Standing	Bowl/playoffs
Austin Kangaroos (Texas Intercollegiate Athletic Association) (1994–1995)
1994	Austin	4–6	3–4	4th	
1995	Austin	4–5	4–4	3rd	
Austin Kangaroos (American Southwest Conference) (1996–2004)
1996	Austin	3–7	1–3	T–4th	
1997	Austin	4–6	2–3	T–3rd	
1998	Austin	4–6	4–3	4th	
1999	Austin	3–7	2–5	T–6th	
2000	Austin	7–3	6–3	T–3rd	
2001	Austin	3–6	3–5	6th	
2002	Austin	4–6	4–5	T–5th	
2003	Austin	3–7	3–6	7th	
2004	Austin	3–7	3–6	7th	
2005	Austin	1–9	1–8	T–9th	
Austin:		43–75	36–55		
Total:		43–75			
