= 1981 Austin Kangaroos football team =

American college football season

1981 Austin Kangaroos football

NAIA Division II national co-champion TIAA co-champion

NAIA Division II Championship Game, T 24–24 vs. Concordia–Moorhead
- Conference: Texas Intercollegiate Athletic Association
- Record: 11–1–1 (9–1 TIAA)
- Head coach: Larry Kramer (9th season)
- Home stadium: Louis Calder Stadium

1981 Texas Intercollegiate Athletic Association football standings
	Conf.					Overall
Team	W		L		T	W		L		T
No. 2 Austin +^	9	–	1	–	0	11	–	1	–	1
No. 9 Sul Ross +	9	–	1	–	0	9	–	1	–	0
Tarleton State	6	–	4	–	0	6	–	4	–	0
McMurry	3	–	7	–	0	3	–	7	–	0
Trinity (TX)	2	–	8	–	0	2	–	8	–	0
Lubbock Christian	1	–	9	–	0	1	–	9	–	0
+ – Conference co-champions; ^ – NAIA Division II playoff participant; Rankings from NAIA Division II poll

The 1981 Austin Kangaroos football team was an American football team represented Austin College as a member of the Texas Intercollegiate Athletic Association (TIAA) during the 1981 NAIA Division II football season. In their ninth season under head coach Larry Kramer, the Kangaroos compiled an 11–1–1 record (9–1 against TIAA opponents), and tied for the TIAA championship. After losing their second game, the Kangaroos won 10 straight games. They participated in the NAIA Division II playoffs, defeating Oklahoma Panhandle State (27–16) in the quarterfinals and William Jewell (33–28) in the semifinals. In the national championship game, the Kangaroos played a 24–24 tie with Concordia–Moorhead, resulting in a shared national championship.

The team played its home games at Louis Calder Stadium in Sherman, Texas.

== Schedule ==
Date	Opponent	Site	Result	Attendance	Source
September 12	Lubbock Christian	Louis Calder Stadium; Sherman, TX	W 31–6		
September 19	at Sul Ross	Alpine, TX	L 7–17		
September 26	Tarleton State	Louis Calder Stadium; Sherman, TX	W 50–7		
October 3	at Trinity (TX)	San Antonio, TX	W 24–3		
October 10	McMurry	Louis Calder Stadium; Sherman, TX	W 30–7		
October 17	at Lubbock Christian	Lubbock, TX	W 17–7		
October 24	Sul Ross	Louis Calder Stadium; Sherman, TX	W 17–14		
October 31	at Tarleton State	Stephenville, TX	W 30–21		
November 7	Trinity (TX)	Louis Calder Stadium; Sherman, TX	W 42–20		
November 14	at McMurry	Abilene, TX	W 26–13		
November 21	at Oklahoma Panhandle State*	Goodwell, OK (NAIA Division II Quarterfinal)	W 27–16		
December 5	William Jewell*	Louis Calder Stadium; Sherman, TX (NAIA Division II Semifinal)	W 33–28		
December 12	Concordia–Moorhead*	Louis Calder Stadium; Sherman, TX (NAIA Division II Championship Game)	T 24–24	3,540	
*Non-conference game

== Individual honors ==
The team was led on offense by quarterback Larry Shilling who was selected as the TIAA Offensive Player of the Year in 1980 and returned for the 1981 season. At the end of the 1981 season, Shillings was selected by the American Football Coaches Association as the first-team quarterback on the Kodak College Division II All-America team.

Austin players were selected as first-team players at seven positions on the 1981 All-TIAA football team: quarterback Larry Shillings (tie); wide receiver Clay Oliphant; placekicker and punter Gene Branum; defensive back Chris Luper; linebacker Jeff Robins; and defensive lineman Larry Hickman. Several Austin players also received second-team honors, including running back David Simmons; wide receiver Rory Dukes; offensive guard Don Parnell; offensive tackle David Adams; defensive lineman Rex Baker; linebacker David Bowen; and defensive back Kenny Kirby.

Coach Larry Kramer finished third in voting by the Texas Sports Writers Association for Texas college coach of the year, behind Southwest Texas State coach Jim Wacker and SMU coach Ron Meyer.
