= Brownsboro High School (Texas) =

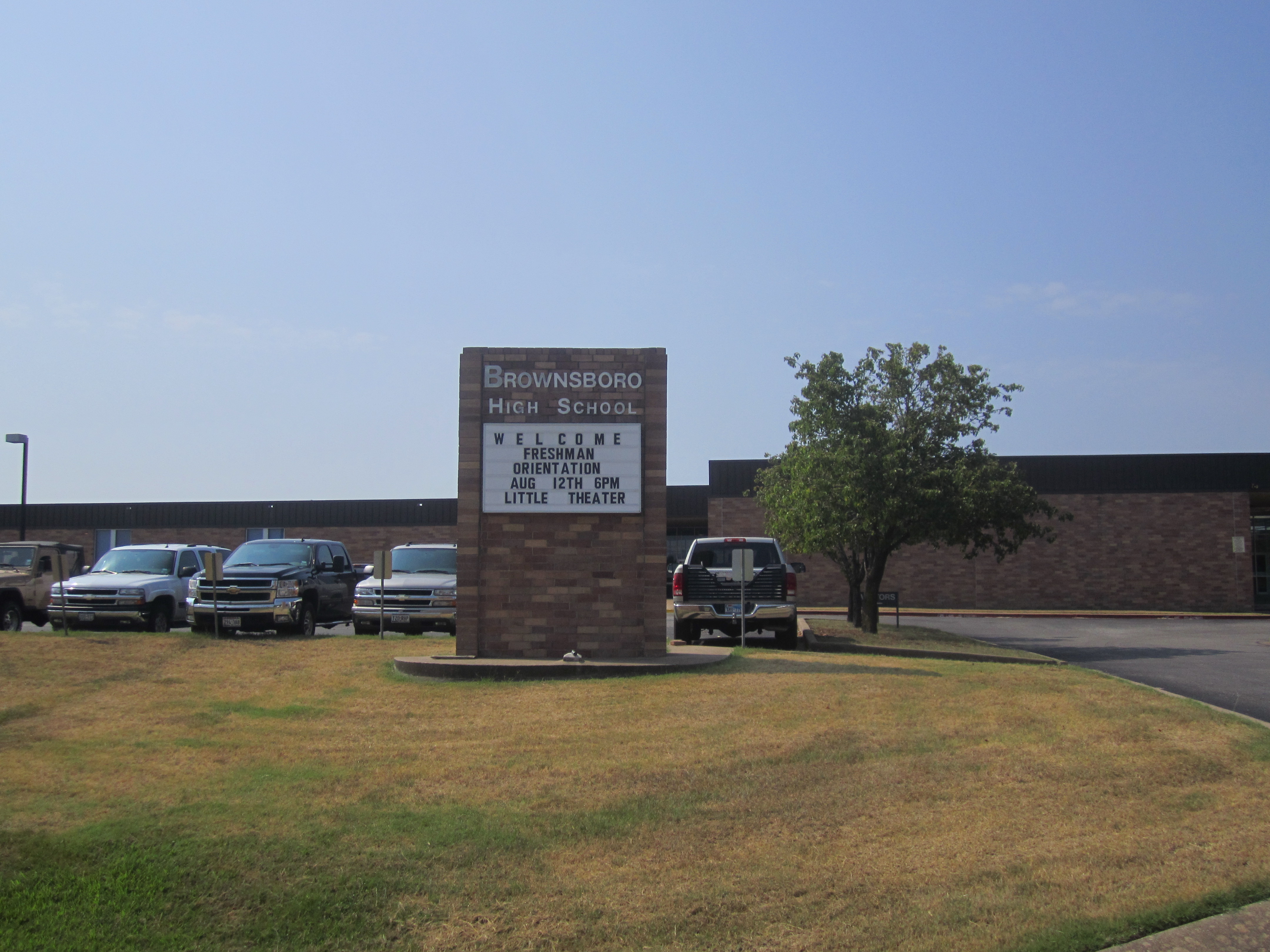

Location
- 13942 Hwy 31 E. Brownsboro, Texas 75756-0465; United States; 32.3005°N 95.6228°W

Information
- School type: Public high school
- Motto: Better Today, Greater Tomorrow
- Established: c.1940
- School district: Brownsboro Independent School District
- Principal: Brent Cooper
- Staff: 63.04 (on an FTE basis)
- Grades: 9–12
- Enrollment: 775 (2023–2024)
- Student to teacher ratio: 12.29
- Colors: Blue & Gold
- Athletics conference: UIL Class AAAA
- Mascot: Bear/Bearette
- Newspaper: Bear Facts
- Yearbook: Bear Tracks
- Website: Brownsboro High School

Brownsboro High School is a public high school located in the city of Brownsboro, Texas, United States and is classified as a 4A school by the University Interscholastic League (UIL). It is a part of the Brownsboro Independent School District located in Henderson County. In 2023 the school was rated "Recognized" by the Texas Education Agency.

== Athletics ==
The Brownsboro Bears compete in volleyball, cross country, football, basketball, powerlifting, swimming, golf, tennis, track, baseball, soccer and softball.

Rival school teams include Van Vandals, Athens Hornets and Canton Eagles.

=== State titles ===
- Boys Basketball
  - 1967(1A)
- Girls Basketball
  - 2022(4A)

=== State finalists ===
- Boys Basketball
  - 1958(1A), 1961(1A), 1985(3A), 1986(3A), 1996(4A)

== Theatre ==
Brownsboro High School theatre program competes in the UIL One Act Play competition.

The school has been named by the Texas Educational Theatre Association as an “Outstanding Campus” for theatre education in 2024 and as an "Exemplary Campus" in 2025.

=== State finalists ===
- 2021 – Anatomy of Gray (3rd)
- 2023 – Ghetto (4th)
- 2024 – A View From The Bridge (7th)
- 2026 – Ghetto (7th)
