= Jim Malosky =

American football player and coach (1928–2011)

James S. Malosky

Biographical details
- Born: December 14, 1928; Crosby, Minnesota, U.S.
- Died: December 4, 2011 (aged 82); Minneapolis, Minnesota, U.S.

Playing career
- 1947–1949: Minnesota

Coaching career (HC unless noted)
- 1958–1997: Minnesota–Duluth

Head coaching record
- Overall: 255–125–13 (college)

Accomplishments and honors

Championships
- 3 MIAC (1960–1961, 1973); 8 NIC/NSIC (1979–1980, 1985–1987, 1990, 1995–1996)

Awards
- 2× NIC/NCIS Coach of the Year (1985, 1996)

James Samuel Malosky Sr. (December 14, 1928 – December 4, 2011) was an American football coach. He ranks 18th all-time in wins among college football coaches in all divisions. He was the head football coach at the University of Minnesota Duluth (formerly known as Duluth State Teachers College) for 40 years from 1958 to 1997. He compiled a career record of 255–125–13 and is ranked second all-time in wins among NCAA Division II football coaches.

== Biography ==
Malosky was a native of Crosby, Minnesota, who began his coaching career at Morris and Morningside-Edina High Schools. He was hired as the head football coach at University of Minnesota Duluth in 1958 and led the team to Minnesota Intercollegiate Athletic Conference championships in 1960, 1961 and 1973. In 1976, the school joined the Northern Sun Intercollegiate Conference. Malosky led the team to eight Northern Sun championships, in 1979, 1980, 1985, 1986, 1987, 1990, 1995, and 1996. Malosky's 1980 team compiled a perfect 10–0 record, which was part of a 20-game winning streak, which "at the time was the longest in all of college football."

Malosky was forced to retire due to health concerns. Malosky had never missed a game, practice, or teaching assignment in 40 years. However, in May 1998, he suffered a mild stroke. He recovered from the stroke sufficiently to attend practices and games in the fall of 1998, but he realized that he "couldn't run the ship the way he had in the past."

At the time of his retirement, he was the winningest coach in NCAA Division II football history and ranked 11th among all college football coaches in all divisions. As of 2008, he ranked 2nd among NCAA Division II coaches (behind Ken Sparks) and 18th among all college football coaches in all divisions.

Malosky was inducted into the Minnesota High School Football Coaches Association Hall of Fame in 1994, the University of Minnesota Hall of Fame in 1996, the University of Minnesota Duluth Athletic Hall of Fame in 1999, and the Northern Sun Intercollegiate Athletic Conference Hall of Fame in 2000.

In 2004, the University of Minnesota Duluth renamed its football stadium in Malosky's honor as James S. Malosky Stadium. The stadium underwent a $6.5 million renovation in 2008. At a nationally televised game on September 11, 2008, the stadium was officially dedicated to Malosky. Malosky was honored in a pre-game ceremony and received a standing ovation from the crowd.

In 2009, Malosky received the Distinguished Minnesotan Award by the Minnesota Chapter of the National Football Foundation and the College Football Hall of Fame. The award is given to individuals who have made a lifelong contribution to football in the state of Minnesota.

The Jim Malosky Coach of the Year Award, named after Malosky, is given annually to the Division II Coach of the Year.

He died December 4, 2011, due to respiratory failure.

== Head coaching record ==
Year	Team	Overall	Conference	Standing	Bowl/playoffs
Minnesota–Duluth Bulldogs (Minnesota Intercollegiate Athletic Conference) (1958–1975)
1958	Minnesota–Duluth	4–4	4–3	4th	
1959	Minnesota–Duluth	5–2–1	4–2–1	3rd	
1960	Minnesota–Duluth	6–1–1	6–1	1st	
1961	Minnesota–Duluth	8–1	7–0	1st	
1962	Minnesota–Duluth	6–2–1	5–1–1	2nd	
1963	Minnesota–Duluth	3–6	2–5	6th	
1964	Minnesota–Duluth	4–5	2–5	5th	
1965	Minnesota–Duluth	4–5	3–4	5th	
1966	Minnesota–Duluth	5–3–1	4–2–1	3rd	
1967	Minnesota–Duluth	7–1–1	5–1–1	T–2nd	
1968	Minnesota–Duluth	4–6	2–5	5th	
1969	Minnesota–Duluth	4–6	2–5	6th	
1970	Minnesota–Duluth	7–2–1	4–2–1	3rd	
1971	Minnesota–Duluth	6–3–1	5–2	3rd	
1972	Minnesota–Duluth	5–4	4–3	T–3rd	
1973	Minnesota–Duluth	8–1	6–1	T–1st	
1974	Minnesota–Duluth	7–2–1	4–2–1	T–3rd	
1975	Minnesota–Duluth	8–2	6–1	2nd	
Minnesota–Duluth Bulldogs (Northern Intercollegiate Conference / Northern Sun Intercollegiate Conference) (1976–1997)
1976	Minnesota–Duluth	6–4	5–2	T–2nd	
1977	Minnesota–Duluth	7–3	4–3	T–4th	
1978	Minnesota–Duluth	7–3	6–2	T–2nd	
1979	Minnesota–Duluth	8–2	7–1	T–1st	
1980	Minnesota–Duluth	10–0	8–0	1st	
1981	Minnesota–Duluth	9–1	5–1	2nd	
1982	Minnesota–Duluth	7–2	5–1	2nd	
1983	Minnesota–Duluth	6–4	4–2	T–2nd	
1984	Minnesota–Duluth	6–4	4–2	T–3rd	
1985	Minnesota–Duluth	8–2	6–0	1st	
1986	Minnesota–Duluth	8–1–2	4–0–2	T–1st	
1987	Minnesota–Duluth	8–3	5–1	1st	
1988	Minnesota–Duluth	7–4	4–2	3rd	
1989	Minnesota–Duluth	5–5	3–3	T–4th	
1990	Minnesota–Duluth	9–1–1	5–1	T–1st	
1991	Minnesota–Duluth	6–4	4–1	3rd	
1992	Minnesota–Duluth	5–5–1	4–1–1	T–2nd	
1993	Minnesota–Duluth	8–3	4–2	T–2nd	
1994	Minnesota–Duluth	4–7	3–3	T–4th	
1995	Minnesota–Duluth	8–2–1	5–0–1	T–1st	
1996	Minnesota–Duluth	8–3	6–0	1st	
1997	Minnesota–Duluth	4–6	4–2	2nd	
Minnesota–Duluth:		255–125–13	180–75–10		
Total:		255–125–13			
National championship Conference title Conference division title or championship game berth

== See also ==
- List of college football career coaching wins leaders
