= 1981 NAIA Division II football season =

American college football season

- Regular season: August–November 1981
- Postseason: November–December 1981
- National Championship: Louis Calder Stadium; Sherman, TX
- Champions: Austin; Concordia–Moorhead (3)

The 1981 NAIA Division II football season, as part of the 1981 college football season in the United States and the 26th season of college football sponsored by the NAIA, was the 21st season of play of the NAIA's lower division for football.

The season was played from August to November 1981 and culminated in the 1981 NAIA Division II Football National Championship, played at Louis Calder Stadium in Sherman, Texas.

Austin and Concordia–Moorhead tied in the championship game, 24–24, and were declared co-national champions. It was Austin's first NAIA national title and Concordia's third.

== Conference changes ==
- This is the final season that the Minnesota Intercollegiate Athletic Conference is officially recognized as an NAIA football conferences. The MIAC, and it nine members from Minnesota, became an NCAA Division III conference for the 1982 season, where the league continues to sponsor football.

== Conference standings ==
1981 Frontier Conference football standings
	Conf.					Overall
Team	W		L		T	W		L		T
Carroll (MT) $	5	–	1	–	0	6	–	3	–	0
Montana Tech	4	–	1	–	1	5	–	3	–	2
Rocky Mountain	2	–	4	–	0	2	–	6	–	0
Western Montana	0	–	5	–	1	0	–	7	–	1
$ – Conference champion

1981 Heart of America Athletic Conference football standings
	Conf.					Overall
Team	W		L		T	W		L		T
No. 3 William Jewell $^	8	–	0	–	0	11	–	1	–	0
No. 17 Missouri Valley	7	–	1	–	0	8	–	2	–	0
No. 18 Baker	6	–	2	–	0	8	–	2	–	0
Graceland	5	–	3	–	0	7	–	3	–	0
Ottawa	4	–	4	–	0	5	–	4	–	1
MidAmerica Nazarene	3	–	5	–	0	4	–	6	–	0
Central Methodist	2	–	6	–	0	3	–	7	–	0
Tarkio	1	–	7	–	0	1	–	9	–	0
Culver–Stockton	0	–	8	–	0	0	–	10	–	0
$ – Conference champion; ^ – NAIA Division II playoff participant; Rankings from NAIA Division II poll

1981 Hoosier–Buckeye Conference football standings
	Conf.					Overall
Team	W		L		T	W		L		T
No. 8 Anderson (IN) $^	8	–	0	–	0	8	–	2	–	0
No. 10 Findlay	7	–	1	–	0	8	–	1	–	0
Wilmington (OH)	5	–	3	–	0	6	–	3	–	0
Hanover	5	–	3	–	0	5	–	3	–	1
Defiance	4	–	4	–	0	4	–	5	–	0
Earlham	3	–	5	–	0	4	–	5	–	0
Taylor	3	–	5	–	0	4	–	5	–	0
Manchester (IN)	1	–	7	–	0	1	–	8	–	0
Bluffton	0	–	8	–	0	0	–	9	–	0
+ – Conference co-champions; ^ – NAIA Division II playoff participant; Rankings from NAIA Division II poll

1981 Illini–Badger Football Conference standings
	Conf.					Overall
Team	W		L		T	W		L		T
Northeastern Illinois +	3	–	1	–	1	5	–	5	–	1
Milton +	3	–	1	–	1	4	–	5	–	1
Concordia (WI) +	2	–	1	–	1	5	–	2	–	2
Eureka	2	–	2	–	1	3	–	5	–	1
Concordia (IL)	2	–	2	–	0	3	–	6	–	0
Lakeland	0	–	5	–	0	1	–	7	–	1
+ – Conference co-champions

1981 Kansas Collegiate Athletic Conference football standings
	Conf.					Overall
Team	W		L		T	W		L		T
No. 13 Bethany (KS) $	8	–	0	–	0	9	–	1	–	0
Southwestern (KS)	5	–	2	–	1	5	–	2	–	2
Friends	5	–	3	–	0	5	–	4	–	0
Sterling	5	–	3	–	0	5	–	4	–	0
St. Mary of the Plains	4	–	4	–	0	4	–	6	–	0
Tabor	3	–	5	–	0	3	–	6	–	0
Kansas Wesleyan	2	–	5	–	1	2	–	7	–	1
McPherson	2	–	6	–	0	2	–	7	–	0
Bethel (KS)	1	–	7	–	0	1	–	8	–	0
$ – Conference champion; Rankings from NAIA Division II poll

1981 Minnesota Intercollegiate Athletic Conference football standings
	Conf.					Overall
Team	W		L		T	W		L		T
No. 1 Concordia–Moorhead $^	8	–	0	–	0	11	–	0	–	2
No. 15 Saint John's (MN)	6	–	2	–	0	7	–	2	–	0
No. 19 St. Thomas (MN)	6	–	2	–	0	7	–	2	–	0
Gustavus Adolphus	5	–	3	–	0	6	–	4	–	0
Augsburg	3	–	5	–	0	4	–	6	–	0
Macalester	2	–	6	–	0	4	–	6	–	0
St. Olaf	2	–	6	–	0	4	–	7	–	0
Bethel (MN)	2	–	6	–	0	3	–	7	–	0
Hamline	2	–	6	–	0	3	–	7	–	0
$ – Conference champion; ^ – NAIA Division II playoff participant; Rankings from NAIA Division II poll

1981 Nebraska Intercollegiate Athletic Conference football standings
	Conf.					Overall
Team	W		L		T	W		L		T
No. 12 Concordia (NE) +	4	–	1	–	0	9	–	1	–	0
Hastings +	4	–	1	–	0	6	–	3	–	0
Midland +	4	–	1	–	0	5	–	4	–	0
Doane	2	–	3	–	0	2	–	7	–	0
Nebraska Wesleyan	1	–	4	–	0	2	–	7	–	0
Dana	0	–	5	–	0	1	–	8	–	0
+ – Conference co-champions; Rankings from NAIA Division II poll

1981 North Dakota College Athletic Conference football standings
	Conf.					Overall
Team	W		L		T	W		L		T
No. 6 Dickinson State $^	6	–	0	–	0	9	–	1	–	0
No. 16 Jamestown	5	–	1	–	0	8	–	1	–	0
Valley City State	4	–	2	–	0	5	–	4	–	0
North Dakota Science	3	–	3	–	0	5	–	3	–	0
Minot State	2	–	4	–	0	3	–	4	–	1
Mayville State	1	–	5	–	0	1	–	8	–	0
Bismarck JC	0	–	6	–	0	1	–	8	–	0
$ – Conference champion; ^ – NAIA Division II playoff participant; Rankings from NAIA Division II poll

1981 Northwest Conference football standings
	Conf.					Overall
Team	W		L		T	W		L		T
No. 5 Pacific Lutheran $^	5	–	0	–	0	9	–	1	–	0
No. 14 Linfield	4	–	1	–	0	7	–	2	–	0
Lewis & Clark	2	–	3	–	0	4	–	5	–	0
Whitworth	2	–	3	–	0	4	–	5	–	0
Willamette	2	–	3	–	0	4	–	5	–	0
Pacific (OR)	0	–	5	–	0	0	–	9	–	0
$ – Conference champion; ^ – NAIA Division II playoff participantpoll=NAIA Division II poll; Rankings from AP Poll

1981 South Dakota Intercollegiate Conference football standings
	Conf.					Overall
Team	W		L		T	W		L		T
South Dakota Tech +	5	–	1	–	0	7	–	2	–	0
Sioux Falls +	5	–	1	–	0	6	–	3	–	1
South Dakota–Springfield	4	–	2	–	0	6	–	4	–	0
Huron	3	–	3	–	0	6	–	4	–	0
Dakota State	2	–	4	–	0	3	–	7	–	0
Black Hills State	1	–	4	–	1	1	–	7	–	1
Dakota Wesleyan	0	–	5	–	1	0	–	9	–	1
+ – Conference co-champions

1981 Southern California Intercollegiate Athletic Conference football standings
	Conf.					Overall
Team	W		L		T	W		L		T
Whittier $	5	–	0	–	0	6	–	4	–	0
Claremont-Mudd	4	–	1	–	0	4	–	5	–	0
Redlands	3	–	2	–	0	5	–	5	–	0
Occidental	1	–	4	–	0	3	–	7	–	0
La Verne	1	–	4	–	0	2	–	7	–	0
Pomona-Pitzer	1	–	4	–	0	1	–	8	–	0
$ – Conference champion

1981 Texas Intercollegiate Athletic Association football standings
	Conf.					Overall
Team	W		L		T	W		L		T
No. 2 Austin +^	9	–	1	–	0	11	–	1	–	1
No. 9 Sul Ross +	9	–	1	–	0	9	–	1	–	0
Tarleton State	6	–	4	–	0	6	–	4	–	0
McMurry	3	–	7	–	0	3	–	7	–	0
Trinity (TX)	2	–	8	–	0	2	–	8	–	0
Lubbock Christian	1	–	9	–	0	1	–	9	–	0
+ – Conference co-champions; ^ – NAIA Division II playoff participant; Rankings from NAIA Division II poll

1981 NAIA Division II independents football records
	Conf.			Overall
Team	W	L	T	W		L		T
No. 4 Westminster (PA) ^		–		10	–	1	–	0
No. 7 Oklahoma Panhandle State ^		–		9	–	1	–	0
No. 11 Cal Lutheran		–		8	–	2	–	0
No. 20 Peru State		–		7	–	2	–	0
Northwestern (IA)		–		6	–	2	–	1
Azusa Pacific		–		7	–	3	–	0
Loras		–		6	–	3	–	1
Geneva		–		5	–	3	–	1
Waynesburg		–		5	–	3	–	1
Westmar		–		5	–	4	–	0
Chadron State		–		5	–	5	–	0
Benedictine (KS)		–		4	–	6	–	0
Texas Lutheran		–		4	–	6	–	0
Simon Fraser		–		3	–	7	–	0
Iowa Wesleyan		–		2	–	7	–	0
^ – NAIA Division II playoff participant; Rankings from NAIA Division II poll

== Conference champions ==
Conference	Champion	Record
Frontier	Carroll (MT)	5–1
Heart of America	William Jewell	8–0
Hoosier-Buckeye	Anderson (IN)	8–0
Kansas	Bethany	8–0
Minnesota	Concordia–Moorhead	8–0
Nebraska	Concordia–Nebraska; Hastings; Midland Lutheran	4–1
North Dakota	Dickinson State	6–0
Northwest	Pacific Lutheran	5–0
South Dakota	Sioux Falls; South Dakota Tech	5–1
Texas	Austin; Sul Ross	9–1

== Postseason ==
Quarterfinals; Campus sites
Austin	27
Oklahoma Panhandle State*	16
Pacific Lutheran	14
William Jewell*	19
Dickinson State	9
Concordia–Moorhead*	13
Anderson (IN)	6
Westminster (PA)*	21

Semifinals; Campus sites
Austin*	33
William Jewell	28
Concordia–Moorhead	23
Westminster (PA)*	17

Championship; Sherman, TX
Austin*	24
Concordia–Moorhead	24

== See also ==
- 1981 NAIA Division I football season
- 1981 NCAA Division I-A football season
- 1981 NCAA Division I-AA football season
- 1981 NCAA Division II football season
- 1981 NCAA Division III football season
