= Arizona State Board for Charter Schools =

State agency

The Arizona State Board for Charter Schools (ASBCS) is an agency of the state of Arizona. It is the regulator for the state's charter schools, headquartered in the Executive Tower at the state capitol building in Phoenix.

Arizona Superintendent of Public Instruction, Kathy Hoffman shared in February 2019 that she is seeking more transparency of Arizona Charter Schools: "Any charter expenditure must be in the best interest of the schools and the students they serve. I appreciate the Governor’s recommendation to increase staff at the charter school board."

== Mission statement ==
"To improve public education in Arizona by sponsoring charter schools that provide quality educational choices."
