= Jake Christiansen Stadium =

Sports complex in Minnesota

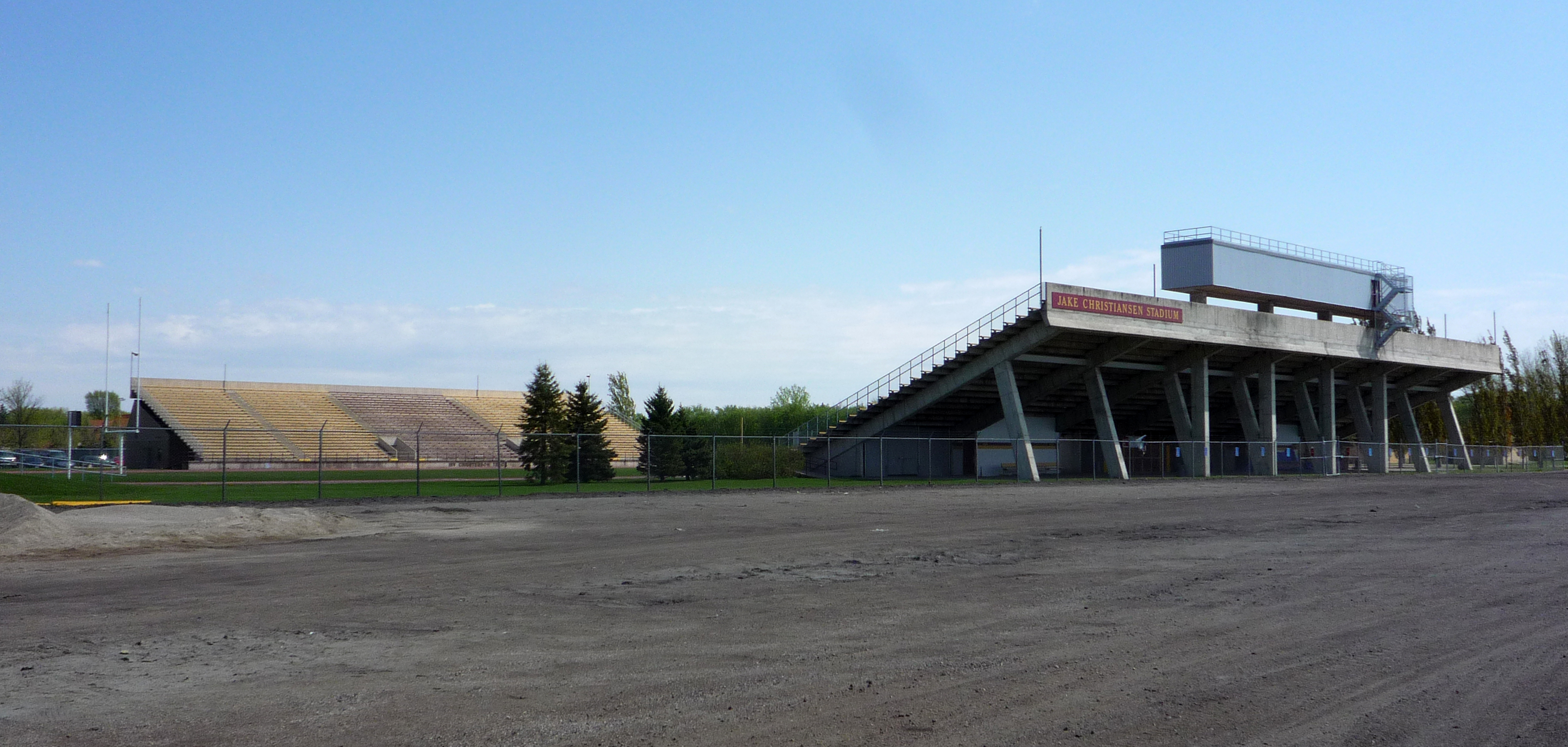

- Location in Minnesota Location in the United States
- Location: Moorhead, Minnesota
- Coordinates: 46.85903°N 96.76582°W
- Owner: Concordia College (Moorhead, Minnesota)
- Operator: Concordia Cobbers Athletics
- Capacity: 7,000
- Surface: Field Turf

Jake Christiansen Stadium is a sports complex on the campus of Concordia College in Moorhead, Minnesota. It is primarily used for college football and other athletic events. It was named to honor long-time coach Jake Christiansen who built a successful football program at the school. The stadium has a seating capacity of 7,000.

Improvements to the facility over time include field turf in 2010, additional facility expansion in 2013, a $1 million scoreboard update in 2018, and the addition of stadium lighting in 2025.
