= 1978 NAIA Division II football season =

American college football season

- Regular season: August–November 1978
- Postseason: November–December 1978
- National Championship: Donnell Stadium; Findlay, OH
- Champions: Concordia–Moorhead (2)

The 1978 NAIA Division II football season, as part of the 1978 college football season in the United States and the 23rd season of college football sponsored by the NAIA, was the ninth season of play of the NAIA's lower division for football.

The season was played from August to November 1978 and culminated in the 1978 NAIA Division II Football National Championship, played at Donnell Stadium in Findlay, Ohio.

Concordia–Moorhead defeated Findlay in the championship game, 7–0, to win their second NAIA national title.

== Conference changes ==
- This is the final season that the Southern California Intercollegiate Athletic Conference is officially recognized as an NAIA football conferences. The SIAC has since become an NCAA Division III conference.

== Conference standings ==
1978 College Conference of Illinois and Wisconsin football standings
	Conf.					Overall
Team	W		L		T	W		L		T
No. 11 Elmhurst +	7	–	1	–	0	8	–	1	–	0
Millikin +	7	–	1	–	0	8	–	1	–	0
North Central (IL)	5	–	3	–	0	6	–	3	–	0
Carroll (WI)	5	–	3	–	0	6	–	3	–	0
Wheaton (IL)	5	–	3	–	0	6	–	3	–	0
Augustana (IL)	3	–	5	–	0	4	–	5	–	0
Illinois Wesleyan	3	–	5	–	0	4	–	5	–	0
Carthage	1	–	7	–	0	1	–	8	–	0
North Park	0	–	8	–	0	0	–	9	–	0
+ – Conference co-champions; Rankings from NAIA Division II poll

1978 Frontier Conference football standings
	Conf.					Overall
Team	W		L		T	W		L		T
No. 6 Carroll (MT) $^	4	–	0	–	0	9	–	1	–	0
Montana Tech	2	–	1	–	1	2	–	4	–	2
Eastern Montana	2	–	1	–	1	2	–	6	–	1
Rocky Mountain	1	–	3	–	0	1	–	8	–	0
Western Montana	0	–	4	–	0	1	–	8	–	0
$ – Conference champion; ^ – NAIA Division II playoff participant; Rankings from NAIA Division II poll

1978 Heart of America Athletic Conference football standings
	Conf.					Overall
Team	W		L		T	W		L		T
No. 5 Missouri Valley $^	6	–	0	–	0	9	–	2	–	0
No. 18 Baker	4	–	2	–	0	8	–	2	–	0
Ottawa	4	–	2	–	0	7	–	3	–	0
Central Methodist	4	–	2	–	0	6	–	4	–	0
William Jewell	2	–	4	–	0	4	–	6	–	0
Graceland	1	–	5	–	0	3	–	6	–	0
Tarkio	0	–	6	–	0	3	–	7	–	0
$ – Conference champion; ^ – NAIA Division II playoff participant; Rankings from NAIA Division II poll

1978 Hoosier–Buckeye Conference football standings
	Conf.					Overall
Team	W		L		T	W		L		T
No. 2 Findlay $^	8	–	0	–	0	11	–	1	–	0
Hanover	6	–	2	–	0	6	–	2	–	1
Defiance	5	–	3	–	0	5	–	4	–	0
Wilmington (OH)	4	–	4	–	0	5	–	4	–	0
Anderson (IN)	4	–	4	–	0	5	–	4	–	0
Manchester (IN)	4	–	4	–	0	4	–	5	–	0
Bluffton	2	–	6	–	0	2	–	7	–	0
Taylor	2	–	6	–	0	2	–	7	–	0
Earlham	1	–	7	–	0	2	–	7	–	0
$ – Conference champion; ^ – NAIA Division II playoff participant; Rankings from NAIA Division II poll

1978 Illini–Badger Football Conference standings
	Conf.					Overall
Team	W		L		T	W		L		T
No. 19 Milton $	4	–	0	–	0	7	–	2	–	0
Lakeland	3	–	1	–	0	7	–	3	–	0
Northeastern Illinois	2	–	2	–	0	3	–	7	–	0
Eureka	1	–	3	–	0	4	–	6	–	0
Concordia (IL)	0	–	4	–	0	2	–	7	–	0
$ – Conference champion; Rankings from NAIA Division II poll

1978 Kansas Collegiate Athletic Conference football standings
	Conf.					Overall
Team	W		L		T	W		L		T
No. 8 Bethany (KS) $^	8	–	0	–	0	10	–	1	–	0
Southwestern (KS)	7	–	1	–	0	7	–	2	–	0
Friends	5	–	3	–	0	5	–	4	–	0
McPherson	5	–	3	–	0	5	–	4	–	0
Tabor	4	–	4	–	0	4	–	6	–	0
Sterling	3	–	5	–	0	3	–	6	–	0
St. Mary of the Plains	3	–	5	–	0	3	–	7	–	0
Kansas Wesleyan	1	–	7	–	0	1	–	9	–	0
Bethel (KS)	0	–	8	–	0	0	–	9	–	0
$ – Conference champion; ^ – NAIA Division II playoff participant; Rankings from NAIA Division II poll

1978 Minnesota Intercollegiate Athletic Conference football standings
	Conf.					Overall
Team	W		L		T	W		L		T
No. 1 Concordia–Moorhead * +	7	–	1	–	0	11	–	1	–	0
St. Olaf +^	7	–	1	–	0	9	–	2	–	0
No. 15 Gustavus Adolphus	6	–	2	–	0	8	–	2	–	0
No. T–20 Saint John's (MN)	5	–	3	–	0	6	–	3	–	0
St. Thomas (MN)	4	–	4	–	0	5	–	4	–	0
Hamline	3	–	4	–	1	5	–	4	–	1
Augsburg	2	–	5	–	1	3	–	6	–	1
Bethel (MN)	1	–	7	–	0	2	–	8	–	0
Macalester	0	–	8	–	0	0	–	9	–	0
+ – Conference co-champions; ^ – NCAA Division III playoff participant; * – NAIA Division II playoff participant; Rankings from NAIA Division II poll

1978 Nebraska Intercollegiate Athletic Conference football standings
	Conf.					Overall
Team	W		L		T	W		L		T
No. 13 Hastings $	4½	–	½	–	0	8	–	1	–	0
Nebraska Wesleyan	3	–	2	–	0	5	–	4	–	0
Concordia (NE)	3	–	2	–	0	4	–	5	–	1
Doane	2½	–	2½	–	0	6	–	4	–	0
Dana	1	–	4	–	0	2	–	7	–	0
Midland	1	–	4	–	0	1	–	8	–	0
$ – Conference champion; Hastings and Doane played twice; each game counted as ½ of a game in the conference standings.; Rankings from NAIA Division II poll

1978 North Dakota College Athletic Conference football standings
	Conf.					Overall
Team	W		L		T	W		L		T
No. 10 Valley City State $	6	–	0	–	0	8	–	0	–	1
No. 12 Jamestown	5	–	1	–	0	8	–	1	–	0
Dickinson State	4	–	2	–	0	5	–	4	–	0
Minot State	3	–	3	–	0	3	–	4	–	1
Wahpeton Science	2	–	4	–	0	2	–	6	–	0
Mayville State	1	–	5	–	0	1	–	6	–	1
Bismarck JC	0	–	6	–	0	1	–	6	–	0
$ – Conference champion; Rankings from NAIA Division II poll

1978 Northwest Conference football standings
	Conf.					Overall
Team	W		L		T	W		L		T
No. 3 Linfield $^	5	–	0	–	0	9	–	1	–	0
Pacific Lutheran	3	–	2	–	0	5	–	3	–	0
Pacific (OR)	3	–	2	–	0	5	–	4	–	0
Willamette	2	–	3	–	0	3	–	6	–	0
Whitworth	1	–	4	–	0	3	–	6	–	0
Lewis & Clark	1	–	4	–	0	2	–	7	–	0
$ – Conference champion; ^ – NAIA Division II playoff participant; Rankings from NAIA Division II poll

1978 South Dakota Intercollegiate Conference football standings
	Conf.					Overall
Team	W		L		T	W		L		T
No. T–20 Dakota State $	6	–	0	–	0	8	–	2	–	0
South Dakota Tech	5	–	1	–	0	7	–	2	–	1
Dakota Wesleyan	3	–	2	–	1	5	–	4	–	1
Black Hills State	3	–	2	–	1	6	–	3	–	1
Huron	2	–	4	–	0	2	–	7	–	0
South Dakota–Springfield	1	–	5	–	0	1	–	7	–	1
Sioux Falls	0	–	6	–	0	1	–	9	–	0
$ – Conference champion; Rankings from NAIA Division II poll

1978 Southern California Intercollegiate Athletic Conference football standings
	Conf.					Overall
Team	W		L		T	W		L		T
Redlands $	5	–	0	–	0	9	–	1	–	0
Claremont-Mudd	4	–	1	–	0	6	–	3	–	0
Whittier	3	–	2	–	0	6	–	3	–	0
Occidental	2	–	3	–	0	4	–	6	–	0
La Verne	1	–	4	–	0	1	–	7	–	0
Pomona-Pitzer	0	–	5	–	0	0	–	7	–	0
$ – Conference champion

1978 Texas Intercollegiate Athletic Association football standings
	Conf.					Overall
Team	W		L		T	W		L		T
No. 4 Tarleton State $^	7	–	0	–	1	8	–	1	–	1
McMurry	5	–	3	–	0	7	–	3	–	0
Trinity (TX)	2	–	4	–	2	4	–	4	–	2
Austin	2	–	5	–	1	3	–	6	–	1
Sul Ross	2	–	6	–	0	2	–	7	–	0
$ – Conference champion; ^ – NAIA Division II playoff participant; Rankings from NAIA Division II poll

1978 Tri-State Conference football standings
	Conf.					Overall
Team	W		L		T	W		L		T
No. 7 Northwestern (IA) $^	2	–	0	–	0	9	–	2	–	0
Westmar	2	–	1	–	0	8	–	2	–	0
Yankton	0	–	3	–	0	1	–	8	–	1
$ – Conference champion; ^ – NAIA Division II playoff participant; Rankings from NAIA Division II poll

1978 NAIA Division II independents football records
	Conf.			Overall
Team	W	L	T	W		L		T
No. 9 Cal Lutheran		–		8	–	2	–	0
Waynesburg		–		6	–	2	–	0
No. 16 Chadron State		–		7	–	2	–	2
No. 14 Westminster (PA)		–		6	–	2	–	1
No. 17 Illinois College		–		6	–	2	–	1
Peru State		–		5	–	3	–	2
Simon Fraser		–		4	–	5	–	0
Azusa Pacific		–		3	–	6	–	0
Benedictine (KS)		–		3	–	6	–	0
Texas Lutheran		–		3	–	6	–	0
Geneva		–		3	–	7	–	0
Oklahoma Panhandle State		–		2	–	7	–	0
Iowa Wesleyan		–		0	–	9	–	0
Rankings from NAIA Division II poll

== Conference champions ==
Conference	Champion	Record
Frontier	Carroll (MT)	4–0
Heart of America	Missouri Valley	6–0
Hoosier-Buckeye	Findlay	8–0
Illini-Badger	Milton	4–0
Kansas	Bethany	8–0
Minnesota	Concordia–Moorhead; St. Olaf	7–1
Nebraska	Hastings	4–0–1
North Dakota	Valley City State	4–0
Pacific Northwest	Linfield	5–0
South Dakota	Dakota State	6–0
SCIAC	Redlands	5–0
Texas	Tarleton State	7–0–1

== Postseason ==
Quarterfinals; Campus sites
Missouri Valley*	30
Bethany (KS)	16
Findlay*	13
Tarleton State	6
Concordia–Moorhead*	49
Northwestern (IA)	0
Linfield*	32
Carroll (MT)	6

Semifinals; Campus sites
Missouri Valley	9
Findlay*	27
Concordia–Moorhead	24
Linfield*	23

Championship; Findlay, OH
Findlay*	0
Concordia–Moorhead	7

== See also ==
- 1978 NAIA Division I football season
- 1978 NCAA Division I-A football season
- 1978 NCAA Division I-AA football season
- 1978 NCAA Division II football season
- 1978 NCAA Division III football season
