= 1883 Fordham football team =

American college football season

1883 Fordham football
- Conference: Independent
- Record: 4–5
- Head coach: John F. Condon (1st season)

1883 college football records
	Conf.			Overall
Team	W	L	T	W		L		T
Yale		–		9	–	0	–	0
Gallaudet		–		2	–	0	–	0
Carleton		–		1	–	0	–	0
Johns Hopkins		–		1	–	0	–	0
NYU		–		1	–	0	–	0
Harvard		–		8	–	2	–	0
Princeton		–		7	–	1	–	0
Penn		–		6	–	2	–	1
Stevens		–		6	–	4	–	1
Massachusetts		–		1	–	1	–	0
Minnesota		–		1	–	1	–	0
Wesleyan		–		3	–	3	–	0
Williams		–		1	–	1	–	0
Fordham		–		4	–	5	–	0
Michigan		–		2	–	3	–	0
Lafayette		–		2	–	4	–	0
Johns Hopkins		–		1	–	2	–	0
Columbia		–		1	–	3	–	0
Rutgers		–		1	–	6	–	0
Amherst		–		0	–	1	–	0
Dartmouth		–		0	–	1	–	0
Hamline		–		0	–	1	–	0
Lewisburg		–		0	–	1	–	0
Navy		–		0	–	1	–	0
CCNY		–		0	–	2	–	0
Columbian University		–		0	–	2	–	0
Georgetown		–		0	–	2	–	0

The 1883 Fordham football team represented Fordham University during the 1883 college football season. The team was led by its first head coach, John F. Condon.

== Schedule ==
Date	Opponent	Site	Result
	Fordham Reserves		W
	St. Francis Xavier		L 12–6
	St. Francis Xavier		L 12–6
	St. Francis Xavier		W 10–4
	St. Francis Xavier		L 16–4
	Seton Hall		W 6–2
	Seton Hall		W 8–2
	Seton Hall		L 2–0
	Seton Hall		L 10–0
