= 1883 Princeton Tigers football team =

American college football season

1883 Princeton Tigers football
- Conference: Independent
- Record: 7–1
- Head coach: None
- Captain: Alex Moffat

1883 college football records
	Conf.			Overall
Team	W	L	T	W		L		T
Yale		–		9	–	0	–	0
Gallaudet		–		2	–	0	–	0
Carleton		–		1	–	0	–	0
Johns Hopkins		–		1	–	0	–	0
NYU		–		1	–	0	–	0
Harvard		–		8	–	2	–	0
Princeton		–		7	–	1	–	0
Penn		–		6	–	2	–	1
Stevens		–		6	–	4	–	1
Massachusetts		–		1	–	1	–	0
Minnesota		–		1	–	1	–	0
Wesleyan		–		3	–	3	–	0
Williams		–		1	–	1	–	0
Fordham		–		4	–	5	–	0
Michigan		–		2	–	3	–	0
Lafayette		–		2	–	4	–	0
Johns Hopkins		–		1	–	2	–	0
Columbia		–		1	–	3	–	0
Rutgers		–		1	–	6	–	0
Amherst		–		0	–	1	–	0
Dartmouth		–		0	–	1	–	0
Hamline		–		0	–	1	–	0
Lewisburg		–		0	–	1	–	0
Navy		–		0	–	1	–	0
CCNY		–		0	–	2	–	0
Columbian University		–		0	–	2	–	0
Georgetown		–		0	–	2	–	0

The 1883 Princeton Tigers football team represented the College of New Jersey, then more commonly known as Princeton College, in the 1883 college football season. The team finished with a 7–1 record and outscored opponents 238 to 26, using the new scoring rules introduced by Walter Camp. The Tigers won their first seven games before losing the final game of the season to Yale in New York.

Alex Moffat was the team's captain and star player. Moffat played at the halfback position and developed a reputation as "probably the greatest kicker ever seen on a football field." Football historian David M. Nelson credits Moffat with revolutionizing the kicking game in 1883 by developing the "spiral punt," described by Nelson as "a dramatic change from the traditional end-over-end kicks." Moffat has also been credited with inventing the drop kick, and kicked equally well with either foot. In 1883, Moffat kicked 32 goals in 15 games.

== Schedule ==
Date	Time	Opponent	Site	Result	Attendance	Source
October 17		at Rutgers	New Brunswick, NJ (rivalry)	W 20–0		
October 22		Lafayette	University Field; Princeton, NJ	W 53–6		
October 24		at Stevens	St George's Cricket Club; New York, NY	W 14–0		
October 27		Rutgers	University Field; Princeton, NJ	W 61–0		
November 3		Penn	University Field; Princeton, NJ (rivalry)	W 41–6		
November 6		vs. Wesleyan	Polo Grounds; New York, NY	W 24–0		
November 17		Harvard	University Field; Princeton, NJ (rivalry)	W 26–7		
November 24	2:15 p.m.	vs. Yale	Polo Grounds; New York, NY (rivalry)	L 0–6	5,000–6,000	

== Game summaries ==
On Wednesday, October 17, Princeton defeated Rutgers at New Brunswick, New Jersey. Princeton totaled two goals and three touchdowns, all scored in the second half. Rutgers was held to three safe touchdowns.

On Monday, October 22, Princeton defeated Lafayette by a 53–6 score in a game played in Princeton. Princeton totaled five goals from field, four goals from touchdowns, and one touchdown.

On Wednesday, October 24, Princeton defeated Stevens Institute by a 14–0 score at the St. George's Cricket Club in New York. Princeton scored two goals and two touchdowns.

On October 27, Princeton defeated Rutgers by a 61–0 score in a game played in Princeton. Princeton totaled eight goals and three touchdowns to nine safeties.

On November 3, Princeton defeated Pennsylvania in a game played in Princeton by a score of 41–6. Princeton scored on four goals from touchdowns, two goals from field, and two touchdowns. Penn scored on one goal and three safeties.

On November 6, Princeton defeated Wesleyan by a 24–0 score at the Polo Grounds in New York. The game was played "under the new American college rules", while Yale played a game against Rutgers on the same day under the "old Rugby rules".

On November 17, Princeton defeated Harvard by a 26–7 score at the Princeton football grounds. Princeton scored five goals and one touchdown and held Harvard to one goal and one touchdown. Moffat made all five goals, two drop kicks with his right foot, two drop kicks with his left foot, and one from placement.

On November 24, Princeton lost the final game of the season to Yale. The game was played at the Polo Grounds in New York. Yale scored one goal (worth six points) and held Princeton scoreless.
