= 1883 Navy Midshipmen football team =

American college football season

1883 Navy Midshipmen football
- Conference: Independent
- Record: 0–1
- Head coach: None
- Captain: Frank Hill
- Home stadium: Western King Field

1883 college football records
	Conf.			Overall
Team	W	L	T	W		L		T
Yale		–		9	–	0	–	0
Gallaudet		–		2	–	0	–	0
Carleton		–		1	–	0	–	0
Johns Hopkins		–		1	–	0	–	0
NYU		–		1	–	0	–	0
Harvard		–		8	–	2	–	0
Princeton		–		7	–	1	–	0
Penn		–		6	–	2	–	1
Stevens		–		6	–	4	–	1
Massachusetts		–		1	–	1	–	0
Minnesota		–		1	–	1	–	0
Wesleyan		–		3	–	3	–	0
Williams		–		1	–	1	–	0
Fordham		–		4	–	5	–	0
Michigan		–		2	–	3	–	0
Lafayette		–		2	–	4	–	0
Johns Hopkins		–		1	–	2	–	0
Columbia		–		1	–	3	–	0
Rutgers		–		1	–	6	–	0
Amherst		–		0	–	1	–	0
Dartmouth		–		0	–	1	–	0
Hamline		–		0	–	1	–	0
Lewisburg		–		0	–	1	–	0
Navy		–		0	–	1	–	0
CCNY		–		0	–	2	–	0
Columbian University		–		0	–	2	–	0
Georgetown		–		0	–	2	–	0

The 1883 Navy Midshipmen football team represented the United States Naval Academy in the 1883 college football season. The team was the third intercollegiate football squad to represent the United States Naval Academy, and the first time the school participated in consecutive seasons. The squad was captained by member Frank Hill. The team played just a single game, a 2 to 0 (2–0) shutout loss to Johns Hopkins, which was the school's first ever loss. The squad was the first to have the approval of the academy's staff, and is regarded as the first official game played by the Midshipmen. The season continued a seven-season, eight game rivalry between the Naval Academy and Johns Hopkins.

== Schedule ==
Date	Opponent	Site	Result	Attendance
November 29	Johns Hopkins	Unknown; Annapolis, MD (rivalry)	L 0-2	(Note: No records exist to provide attendance figures for the game)

== Prelude ==
The first intercollegiate football game was played on November 6, 1869, between the Rutgers Scarlet Knights, then known as the Rutgers Queensmen, and the New Jersey Tigers, now the Princeton Tigers. The game was a mixture of rugby and soccer, with teams scoring by kicking the ball into the opponent's net. The game slowly developed, with many new and safer rules being added during the early 1870s. The number of schools participating in the sport also grew. However, even with the expansion, Princeton dominated the game, being declared the champion eight times in ten years. Yale was the only team which came close to Princeton, being awarded four championship designations during the same period.

The Naval Academy's first ever football team was fielded in 1879. The squad was entirely student-operated, receiving no official support from Naval Academy officials. The team was entirely funded by its members and their fellow students. The 1879 team participated in just one game, which resulted in a scoreless tie. It was played against the Baltimore Athletic Club, at most likely an unused drill field on the Naval Academy campus. Navy would not field a football team in 1880 or 1881, likely due to the lack of support. When football returned to the academy in 1882, the squad was led by player-coach Vaulx Carter, and won 8–0 in a match with Johns Hopkins, starting the seven-year rivalry between the schools.

== Season summary ==
=== Johns Hopkins 2, Navy 0 ===
The Naval Academy team played its only game of the 1883 season against a squad from Johns Hopkins University. It was captained by Frank Hill, and was the first squad to receive approval from Naval Academy faculty. Previously, the squad was operated entirely by students. The game was played at the Naval Academy on November 29, 1883, Thanksgiving Day, most likely on an unused drill field or parade field. The game "began in heat and discussion", with the "skillful and light weight" Johns Hopkins controlling the "endurance and muscle" of the Naval Academy's team. However, tensions in the game quickly escalated. During the middle of the game, "matters grew so hot" that Johns Hopkins players were preparing to stop playing. Johns Hopkins scored two single-point safeties and shutout Navy, winning 2–0. The game "ended in quarrel and wrangle".

== Postseason and aftermath ==
The first postseason college football game would not be played until 1902, with the Pasadena Tournament of Roses' establishment of the east–west tournament game, later known as the Rose Bowl. The Midshipmen would not participate in their first Rose Bowl until the 1923 season, when they went 5–1–2 and tied with the Washington Huskies 14–14 in the match. As a result of the lack of a competition, there were no postseason games played after the 1882 season. According to statistics compiled by the National Championship Foundation, Parke Davis, the Helms Athletic Foundation, and the Billingsley college football research center, Yale was declared the 1883 season champion, giving them their ninth championship overall.

The Midshipmen's loss was the first in school history, and ended the team's shutout streak at two seasons. The Naval Academy would not get another shutout until the 1886 season, when they defeated Johns Hopkins 6–0. The 1883 season continued a seven-season, eight-game long rivalry with Johns Hopkins, which Navy would win, five games to four. The 1883 game was the first win for Johns Hopkins, which had officially started playing football in 1881. 1883 is considered to be the first season played by the Naval Academy, according to the school athletic department. Navy would finish the 1880s with four winning seasons, and an overall record of 14–12–2. The school would outscore their opponents 292–231, and would finish the 19th century with an overall record of 54–19–3.
