= 1883 Penn Quakers football team =

American college football season

1883 Penn Quakers football
- Conference: Independent
- Record: 6–2–1
- Head coach: None
- Captain: Alexander Gray
- Home stadium: Recreation Park

1883 college football records
	Conf.			Overall
Team	W	L	T	W		L		T
Yale		–		9	–	0	–	0
Gallaudet		–		2	–	0	–	0
Carleton		–		1	–	0	–	0
Johns Hopkins		–		1	–	0	–	0
NYU		–		1	–	0	–	0
Harvard		–		8	–	2	–	0
Princeton		–		7	–	1	–	0
Penn		–		6	–	2	–	1
Stevens		–		6	–	4	–	1
Massachusetts		–		1	–	1	–	0
Minnesota		–		1	–	1	–	0
Wesleyan		–		3	–	3	–	0
Williams		–		1	–	1	–	0
Fordham		–		4	–	5	–	0
Michigan		–		2	–	3	–	0
Lafayette		–		2	–	4	–	0
Johns Hopkins		–		1	–	2	–	0
Columbia		–		1	–	3	–	0
Rutgers		–		1	–	6	–	0
Amherst		–		0	–	1	–	0
Dartmouth		–		0	–	1	–	0
Hamline		–		0	–	1	–	0
Lewisburg		–		0	–	1	–	0
Navy		–		0	–	1	–	0
CCNY		–		0	–	2	–	0
Columbian University		–		0	–	2	–	0
Georgetown		–		0	–	2	–	0

The 1883 Penn Quakers football team represented the University of Pennsylvania in the 1883 college football season. Penn finished with a 6–2–1 record. The team played its home matches at Recreation Park, the Philadelphia Phillies' first ballpark.

== Schedule ==
Date	Time	Opponent	Site	Result	Attendance	Source
October 13		at Harvard	Jarvis Field; Cambridge, MA (rivalry)	L 0–4		
October 20		Johns Hopkins	Philadelphia, PA	W 26–6		
October 27		Lafayette	Recreation Park; Philadelphia, PA	W 44–4		
November 3		at Princeton	University Field; Princeton, NJ (rivalry)	L 6–41		
November 10		Johns Hopkins	Recreation Park; Philadelphia, PA	W 30–0		
November 14		Columbia	Recreation Park; Philadelphia, PA	W 35–1		
November 17		at Rutgers	New Brunswick, NJ	W 18–0		
November 24		Penn alumni	Recreation Park; Philadelphia, PA	W 39–7		
November 29	10:30 a.m.	at Stevens	St. George's Cricket Club grounds; Hoboken, NJ	T 6–6	300	
