= 1883 Harvard Crimson football team =

American college football season

1883 Harvard Crimson football
- Conference: Independent
- Record: 8–2
- Head coach: None
- Home stadium: Jarvis Field

1883 college football records
	Conf.			Overall
Team	W	L	T	W		L		T
Yale		–		9	–	0	–	0
Gallaudet		–		2	–	0	–	0
Carleton		–		1	–	0	–	0
Johns Hopkins		–		1	–	0	–	0
NYU		–		1	–	0	–	0
Harvard		–		8	–	2	–	0
Princeton		–		7	–	1	–	0
Penn		–		6	–	2	–	1
Stevens		–		6	–	4	–	1
Massachusetts		–		1	–	1	–	0
Minnesota		–		1	–	1	–	0
Wesleyan		–		3	–	3	–	0
Williams		–		1	–	1	–	0
Fordham		–		4	–	5	–	0
Michigan		–		2	–	3	–	0
Lafayette		–		2	–	4	–	0
Johns Hopkins		–		1	–	2	–	0
Columbia		–		1	–	3	–	0
Rutgers		–		1	–	6	–	0
Amherst		–		0	–	1	–	0
Dartmouth		–		0	–	1	–	0
Hamline		–		0	–	1	–	0
Lewisburg		–		0	–	1	–	0
Navy		–		0	–	1	–	0
CCNY		–		0	–	2	–	0
Columbian University		–		0	–	2	–	0
Georgetown		–		0	–	2	–	0

The 1883 Harvard Crimson football team represented Harvard University in the 1883 college football season. The team compiled an 8–2 record, losing its rivalry games against both Princeton and Yale. Randolph M. Appleton was the team captain.

== Schedule ==
Date	Time	Opponent	Site	Result	Attendance	Source
October 6		Wesleyan	Jarvis Field; Cambridge, MA	W 23–1		
October 13		Penn	Jarvis Field; Cambridge, MA (rivalry)	W 4–0		
October 17		Boston Tech	Jarvis Field; Cambridge, MA	W 14–1		
October 20		at Stevens	St. George's Cricket Club grounds; Hoboken, NJ	W 14–4		
October 27		at Wesleyan	Hartford Ball Club Grounds; Hartford, CT	W 19–8		
November 3		Williams	Jarvis Field; Cambridge, MA	W 37–0	1,000	
November 6		Stevens	Jarvis Field; Cambridge, MA	W 11–2		
November 17		at Princeton	University Field; Princeton, NJ (rivalry)	L 7–26		
November 22		Michigan	Jarvis Field; Cambridge, MA	W 3–0	500	
November 29	2:37 p.m.	vs. Yale	Polo Grounds; New York, NY (rivalry)	L 2–23	nearly 10,000	
