= 1883 Rutgers Queensmen football team =

American college football season

1883 Rutgers Queensmen football
- Conference: Independent
- Record: 1–6
- Head coach: None
- Captain: Charles Pattison
- Home stadium: College Field

1883 college football records
	Conf.			Overall
Team	W	L	T	W		L		T
Yale		–		9	–	0	–	0
Gallaudet		–		2	–	0	–	0
Carleton		–		1	–	0	–	0
Johns Hopkins		–		1	–	0	–	0
NYU		–		1	–	0	–	0
Harvard		–		8	–	2	–	0
Princeton		–		7	–	1	–	0
Penn		–		6	–	2	–	1
Stevens		–		6	–	4	–	1
Massachusetts		–		1	–	1	–	0
Minnesota		–		1	–	1	–	0
Wesleyan		–		3	–	3	–	0
Williams		–		1	–	1	–	0
Fordham		–		4	–	5	–	0
Michigan		–		2	–	3	–	0
Lafayette		–		2	–	4	–	0
Johns Hopkins		–		1	–	2	–	0
Columbia		–		1	–	3	–	0
Rutgers		–		1	–	6	–	0
Amherst		–		0	–	1	–	0
Dartmouth		–		0	–	1	–	0
Hamline		–		0	–	1	–	0
Lewisburg		–		0	–	1	–	0
Navy		–		0	–	1	–	0
CCNY		–		0	–	2	–	0
Columbian University		–		0	–	2	–	0
Georgetown		–		0	–	2	–	0

The 1883 Rutgers Queensmen football team represented Rutgers University in the 1883 college football season. The Queensmen compiled a 1–6 record and were outscored by their opponents, 255 to 54. The team had no coach, and its captain was Charles Pattison.

== Schedule ==
Date	Time	Opponent	Site	Result	Attendance	Source
October 17		Princeton	New Brunswick, NJ (rivalry)	L 0–20		
October 20		at Wesleyan	Middletown, CT	L 0–37		
October 27		at Princeton	Princeton, NJ	L 0–61		
November 1		CCNY	New Brunswick, NJ	W 54–2 or 70–0		
November 6	3:20 p.m.	vs. Yale	Washington Park; Brooklyn, NY	L 0–91	nearly 1,000	
November 10		at Lafayette	Easton, PA	L 0–25		
November 17		Penn	New Brunswick, NJ	L 0–18		
