= 1883 Michigan Wolverines football team =

American college football season

1883 Michigan Wolverines football
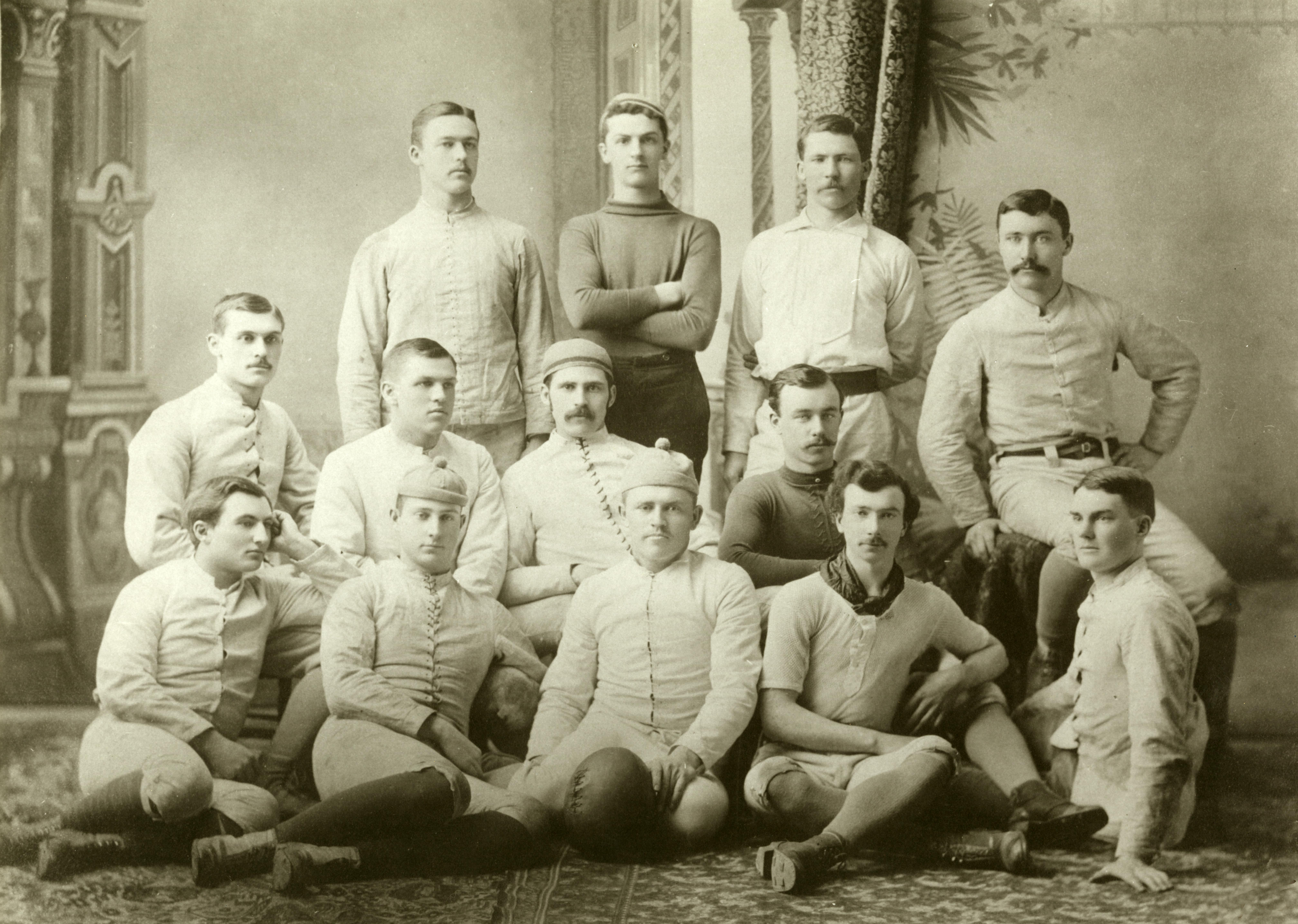
- Conference: Independent
- Record: 2–3
- Head coach: None
- Captain: William J. Olcott
- Home stadium: Ann Arbor Fairgrounds

1883 college football records
	Conf.			Overall
Team	W	L	T	W		L		T
Yale		–		9	–	0	–	0
Gallaudet		–		2	–	0	–	0
Carleton		–		1	–	0	–	0
Johns Hopkins		–		1	–	0	–	0
NYU		–		1	–	0	–	0
Harvard		–		8	–	2	–	0
Princeton		–		7	–	1	–	0
Penn		–		6	–	2	–	1
Stevens		–		6	–	4	–	1
Massachusetts		–		1	–	1	–	0
Minnesota		–		1	–	1	–	0
Wesleyan		–		3	–	3	–	0
Williams		–		1	–	1	–	0
Fordham		–		4	–	5	–	0
Michigan		–		2	–	3	–	0
Lafayette		–		2	–	4	–	0
Johns Hopkins		–		1	–	2	–	0
Columbia		–		1	–	3	–	0
Rutgers		–		1	–	6	–	0
Amherst		–		0	–	1	–	0
Dartmouth		–		0	–	1	–	0
Hamline		–		0	–	1	–	0
Lewisburg		–		0	–	1	–	0
Navy		–		0	–	1	–	0
CCNY		–		0	–	2	–	0
Columbian University		–		0	–	2	–	0
Georgetown		–		0	–	2	–	0

The 1883 Michigan Wolverines football team represented the University of Michigan in the 1883 college football season. The Wolverines played their only home game at the Ann Arbor Fairgrounds.

== Schedule ==
Date	Time	Opponent	Site	Result	Attendance	Source
May 12	10:20 a.m.	Detroit Independents	Ann Arbor Fairgrounds; Ann Arbor, MI	W 40–5		
November 19		at Wesleyan	Hartford, CT	L 6–14		
November 21		at Yale	Hamilton Park; New Haven, CT	L 0–64	400	
November 22		at Harvard	Jarvis Field; Cambridge, MA	L 0–3	500	
November 27		at Stevens	St. George Cricket Club Grounds; Hoboken, NJ	W 17–5 (Note: The result of this game is disputed. New York sources have this as victory for Stevens by a score of 5–1. Michigan sources have this as 17–5 Michigan win. Bentley Historical Library site describes the dispute and includes four links, two describing Michigan version and two describing New York version.)	200	

== Roster ==
The following is the roster of the 1883 team as listed in the University of Michigan yearbook, The Palladium, for 1884.

Forwards

- Elmer Beach (Treasurer of the Foot-Ball Association)
- Harry Bitner (Note: Harry Bitner was born approximately 1861 in Illinois. He was listed as a resident of Mount Carroll, Illinois, in the 1870 and 1880 U.S. Censuses. He was the son of Harry Bitner, born c. 1829, a farmer, and Emma E. Bittner, born c. 1830.)
- Horace Prettyman
- Henry Killilea
- Hugh P. Borden (Note: Hugh P. Borden was born in August 1858 in Indiana. He was listed as a resident of St. Joseph County, Indiana (either Olive or New Carlisle) in the 1870, 1900 and 1930 Censuses. In 1900, he was a farmer in Olive, residing with his wife Edith and children Clinton and Floyd. In 1930, he was engaged in general farming at New Carlisle.)
- Richard Dott

Halfbacks

- Robert Campbell Gemmel, Salt Lake City, Utah (Note: Robert Campbell Gemmel was born on July 5, 1863, in Port Matilda, Pennsylvania. He received a degree in engineering from Michigan in 1884 and returned to Salt Lake City, where he was the assistant managing director of the Jackling allied porphyry mining properties. He died on October 25, 1922, while traveling from Hurley, New Mexico to Los Angeles. Biography published in the journal Mining and Mtallurgy, Number 192, at pp. 36–37.)
- Albert I. Moore

Three-quarter back

- William J. Olcott

Fullback

- Thomas W. Gilmore (President of the Foot-Ball Association)

Substitutes

- Raymond Walter Beach, from Atwood, Michigan (Note: Raymond Walter Beach, born November 29, 1863, in Percival, Iowa, formed the Beach & Beach law firm in Chicago with his brother, Elmer Beach. He was also the brother of noted novelist Rex Beach.)
- Henry S. Mahon (Secretary of the Foot-Ball Association) (Note: Mahon became a lawyer. He practiced in Detroit and later Duluth, Minnesota. He died in 1908 from rheumatism of the heart. His daughter, Winifred Mahon Sanford, was a noted short story writer in the 1920s and 1930s.)
- Edgar B. Wright

== Coaching staff ==
- Coach: No coach
- Captain: William J. Olcott
- Manager: Horace Prettyman
