= List of Minnesota Intercollegiate Athletic Conference football standings (1983–present) =

This is a list of yearly Minnesota Intercollegiate Athletic Conference football standings.

== Minnesota Intercollegiate Athletic Conference football standings ==
1983 Minnesota Intercollegiate Athletic Conference football standings
	Conf.					Overall
Team	W		L		T	W		L		T
No. 4 St. Thomas (MN) $^	9	–	0	–	0	9	–	2	–	0
Saint John's (MN)	7	–	2	–	0	7	–	4	–	0
Hamline	6	–	3	–	0	6	–	4	–	0
Gustavus Adolphus	5	–	4	–	0	6	–	4	–	0
Macalester	5	–	4	–	0	6	–	4	–	0
Concordia–Moorhead	4	–	5	–	0	5	–	6	–	0
Augsburg	3	–	6	–	0	4	–	7	–	0
St. Olaf	3	–	6	–	0	3	–	7	–	0
Bethel (MN)	2	–	7	–	0	2	–	8	–	0
Carleton	1	–	8	–	0	2	–	8	–	0
$ – Conference champion; ^ – NAIA Division II playoff participant; Rankings from NAIA Division II poll

1984 Minnesota Intercollegiate Athletic Conference football standings
	Conf.					Overall
Team	W		L		T	W		L		T
Hamline $	8	–	0	–	1	9	–	0	–	1
Gustavus Adolphus	6	–	2	–	1	6	–	2	–	1
St. Thomas (MN)	6	–	2	–	1	6	–	3	–	1
Saint John's (MN)	6	–	3	–	0	6	–	3	–	0
St. Olaf	4	–	3	–	2	5	–	3	–	2
Macalester	4	–	5	–	0	6	–	5	–	0
Concordia–Moorhead	3	–	5	–	1	4	–	5	–	1
Carleton	2	–	6	–	0	3	–	7	–	0
Augsburg	2	–	7	–	0	2	–	8	–	0
Bethel (MN)	0	–	8	–	0	0	–	10	–	0
$ – Conference champion

1985 Minnesota Intercollegiate Athletic Conference football standings
	Conf.					Overall
Team	W		L		T	W		L		T
Saint John's (MN) $^	8	–	1	–	0	8	–	2	–	0
Concordia–Moorhead	7	–	2	–	0	7	–	3	–	0
St. Thomas (MN)	7	–	2	–	0	7	–	3	–	0
Macalester	5	–	4	–	0	6	–	4	–	0
Carleton	4	–	5	–	0	5	–	5	–	0
Hamline	4	–	5	–	0	4	–	6	–	0
St. Olaf	4	–	5	–	0	4	–	6	–	0
Gustavus Adolphus	3	–	6	–	0	3	–	7	–	0
Bethel (MN)	2	–	6	–	1	2	–	7	–	1
Augsburg	0	–	8	–	1	1	–	8	–	1
$ – Conference champion; ^ – NCAA Division III playoff participant

1986 Minnesota Intercollegiate Athletic Conference football standings
	Conf.					Overall
Team	W		L		T	W		L		T
No. 10 Concordia–Moorhead $^	9	–	0	–	0	11	–	2	–	0
Macalester	6	–	2	–	1	7	–	2	–	1
Carleton	6	–	3	–	0	7	–	3	–	0
St. Thomas (MN)	6	–	3	–	0	7	–	3	–	0
Saint John's (MN)	4	–	4	–	1	4	–	4	–	1
St. Olaf	4	–	5	–	0	5	–	5	–	0
Gustavus Adolphus	4	–	5	–	0	4	–	6	–	0
Hamline	4	–	5	–	0	4	–	6	–	0
Augsburg	1	–	8	–	0	1	–	9	–	0
Bethel (MN)	0	–	9	–	0	1	–	9	–	0
$ – Conference champion; ^ – NCAA Division III playoff participant; Rankings from NCAA Division III poll

1987 Minnesota Intercollegiate Athletic Conference football standings
	Conf.					Overall
Team	W		L		T	W		L		T
Gustavus Adolphus $^	9	–	0	–	0	10	–	1	–	0
Saint John's (MN) ^	7	–	2	–	0	8	–	3	–	0
Concordia–Moorhead	7	–	2	–	0	7	–	3	–	0
Carleton	5	–	4	–	0	6	–	4	–	0
Hamline	5	–	4	–	0	6	–	4	–	0
St. Thomas (MN)	5	–	4	–	0	5	–	5	–	0
Macalester	3	–	6	–	0	4	–	6	–	0
St. Olaf	3	–	6	–	0	3	–	7	–	0
Augsburg	0	–	8	–	1	0	–	9	–	1
Bethel (MN)	0	–	8	–	1	0	–	9	–	1
$ – Conference champion; ^ – NCAA Division III playoff participant

1988 Minnesota Intercollegiate Athletic Conference football standings
	Conf.					Overall
Team	W		L		T	W		L		T
Hamline +	8	–	1	–	0	9	–	1	–	0
Concordia–Moorhead +^	8	–	1	–	0	9	–	2	–	0
Saint John's (MN)	7	–	2	–	0	7	–	2	–	0
Carleton	6	–	3	–	0	7	–	3	–	0
Gustavus Adolphus	5	–	4	–	0	6	–	4	–	0
Macalester	3	–	6	–	0	4	–	6	–	0
St. Olaf	3	–	6	–	0	4	–	6	–	0
St. Thomas (MN)	3	–	6	–	0	3	–	7	–	0
Bethel (MN)	1	–	8	–	0	2	–	8	–	0
Augsburg	1	–	8	–	0	1	–	9	–	0
+ – Conference co-champions; ^ – NCAA Division III playoff participant

1989 Minnesota Intercollegiate Athletic Conference football standings
	Conf.					Overall
Team	W		L		T	W		L		T
Saint John's (MN) $^	8	–	0	–	1	10	–	1	–	1
Concordia–Moorhead	6	–	2	–	1	7	–	2	–	1
Carleton	6	–	3	–	0	7	–	3	–	0
Hamline	5	–	4	–	0	6	–	4	–	0
St. Olaf	5	–	4	–	0	6	–	4	–	0
Gustavus Adolphus	5	–	4	–	0	5	–	5	–	0
St. Thomas (MN)	4	–	4	–	1	4	–	5	–	1
Bethel (MN)	2	–	6	–	1	3	–	6	–	1
Augsburg	2	–	7	–	0	2	–	8	–	0
Macalester	0	–	9	–	0	1	–	9	–	0
$ – Conference champion; ^ – NCAA Division III playoff participant

1990 Minnesota Intercollegiate Athletic Conference football standings
	Conf.					Overall
Team	W		L		T	W		L		T
St. Thomas (MN) +^	7	–	2	–	0	8	–	3	–	1
Concordia–Moorhead +	7	–	2	–	0	7	–	3	–	0
Bethel (MN)	6	–	3	–	0	7	–	3	–	0
Hamline	6	–	3	–	0	7	–	3	–	0
Saint John's (MN)	6	–	3	–	0	7	–	3	–	0
Carleton	5	–	4	–	0	5	–	5	–	0
Gustavus Adolphus	4	–	5	–	0	5	–	5	–	0
St. Olaf	3	–	6	–	0	4	–	6	–	0
Macalester	1	–	8	–	0	1	–	9	–	0
Augsburg	0	–	9	–	0	0	–	10	–	0
+ – Conference co-champions; ^ – NCAA Division III playoff participant

1991 Minnesota Intercollegiate Athletic Conference football standings
	Conf.					Overall
Team	W		L		T	W		L		T
Saint John's (MN) $^	8	–	0	–	0	11	–	1	–	0
St. Olaf	6	–	2	–	0	7	–	2	–	0
Bethel (MN)	5	–	3	–	0	6	–	3	–	0
St. Thomas (MN)	5	–	3	–	0	6	–	3	–	0
Gustavus Adolphus	5	–	3	–	0	5	–	4	–	0
Hamline	4	–	4	–	0	5	–	4	–	0
Carleton	3	–	5	–	0	5	–	5	–	0
Concordia–Moorhead	3	–	5	–	0	3	–	6	–	0
Augsburg	1	–	7	–	0	2	–	7	–	0
Macalester	0	–	8	–	0	1	–	8	–	0
$ – Conference champion; ^ – NCAA Division III playoff participant

1992 Minnesota Intercollegiate Athletic Conference football standings
	Conf.					Overall
Team	W		L		T	W		L		T
Carleton $^	8	–	1	–	0	9	–	2	–	0
Saint John's (MN)	7	–	1	–	1	8	–	1	–	1
Concordia–Moorhead	6	–	2	–	1	7	–	2	–	1
Hamline	5	–	4	–	0	6	–	4	–	0
Bethel (MN)	5	–	4	–	0	5	–	5	–	0
Gustavus Adolphus	4	–	5	–	0	4	–	6	–	0
St. Olaf	4	–	5	–	0	4	–	6	–	0
St. Thomas (MN)	3	–	6	–	0	3	–	7	–	0
Augsburg	2	–	7	–	0	3	–	7	–	0
Macalester	0	–	9	–	0	0	–	10	–	0
$ – Conference champion; ^ – NCAA Division III playoff participant

1993 Minnesota Intercollegiate Athletic Conference football standings
	Conf.					Overall
Team	W		L		T	W		L		T
Saint John's (MN) $^	9	–	0	–	0	12	–	1	–	0
St. Thomas (MN)	8	–	1	–	0	8	–	2	–	0
Hamline	6	–	3	–	0	7	–	3	–	0
Concordia–Moorhead	6	–	3	–	0	6	–	4	–	0
Carleton	5	–	4	–	0	6	–	4	–	0
Augsburg	4	–	5	–	0	5	–	5	–	0
St. Olaf	3	–	6	–	0	4	–	6	–	0
Bethel (MN)	2	–	7	–	0	2	–	8	–	0
Gustavus Adolphus	2	–	7	–	0	2	–	8	–	0
Macalester	0	–	9	–	0	0	–	10	–	0
$ – Conference champion; ^ – NCAA Division III playoff participant

1994 Minnesota Intercollegiate Athletic Conference football standings
	Conf.					Overall
Team	W		L		T	W		L		T
Saint John's (MN) $^	8	–	1	–	0	11	–	2	–	0
Hamline	7	–	2	–	0	8	–	2	–	0
Bethel (MN)	6	–	3	–	0	7	–	3	–	0
Concordia–Moorhead	6	–	3	–	0	6	–	4	–	0
Gustavus Adolphus	5	–	4	–	0	5	–	5	–	0
Augsburg	4	–	5	–	0	5	–	5	–	0
St. Thomas (MN)	4	–	5	–	0	4	–	6	–	0
Carleton	3	–	6	–	0	3	–	7	–	0
St. Olaf	2	–	7	–	0	2	–	8	–	0
Macalester	0	–	9	–	0	0	–	10	–	0
$ – Conference champion; ^ – NCAA Division III playoff participant

1995 Minnesota Intercollegiate Athletic Conference football standings
	Conf.					Overall
Team	W		L		T	W		L		T
Saint John's (MN) +	7	–	1	–	1	8	–	1	–	1
Concordia–Moorhead +^	7	–	1	–	1	8	–	2	–	1
Hamline	6	–	3	–	0	7	–	3	–	0
St. Thomas (MN)	6	–	3	–	0	6	–	4	–	0
Augsburg	5	–	4	–	0	6	–	4	–	0
Bethel (MN)	5	–	4	–	0	6	–	4	–	0
St. Olaf	4	–	5	–	0	5	–	5	–	0
Carleton	3	–	6	–	0	3	–	7	–	0
Gustavus Adolphus	1	–	8	–	0	1	–	9	–	0
Macalester	0	–	9	–	0	1	–	9	–	0
+ – Conference co-champions; ^ – NCAA Division III playoff participant

1996 Minnesota Intercollegiate Athletic Conference football standings
	Conf.					Overall
Team	W		L		T	W		L		T
Saint John's (MN) $^	9	–	0	–	0	11	–	1	–	0
Bethel (MN)	8	–	1	–	0	9	–	1	–	0
St. Thomas (MN)	7	–	2	–	0	8	–	2	–	0
Concordia–Moorhead	6	–	3	–	0	6	–	4	–	0
Carleton	4	–	5	–	0	5	–	5	–	0
Hamline	4	–	5	–	0	5	–	5	–	0
Augsburg	2	–	7	–	0	3	–	7	–	0
Macalester	2	–	7	–	0	3	–	7	–	0
Gustavus Adolphus	2	–	7	–	0	2	–	8	–	0
St. Olaf	1	–	8	–	0	2	–	8	–	0
$ – Conference champion; ^ – NCAA Division III playoff participant

1997 Minnesota Intercollegiate Athletic Conference football standings
	Conf.					Overall
Team	W		L		T	W		L		T
Augsburg $^	8	–	1	–	0	10	–	2	–	0
St. Thomas (MN)	7	–	2	–	0	8	–	2	–	0
Concordia–Moorhead ^	7	–	2	–	0	8	–	3	–	0
Saint John's (MN)	6	–	3	–	0	6	–	4	–	0
Bethel (MN)	5	–	4	–	0	6	–	4	–	0
Gustavus Adolphus	5	–	4	–	0	6	–	4	–	0
Hamline	4	–	5	–	0	5	–	5	–	0
St. Olaf	2	–	7	–	0	2	–	8	–	0
Carleton	1	–	8	–	0	2	–	8	–	0
Macalester	0	–	9	–	0	1	–	9	–	0
$ – Conference champion; ^ – NCAA Division III playoff participant

1998 Minnesota Intercollegiate Athletic Conference football standings
	Conf.					Overall
Team	W		L		T	W		L		T
Saint John's (MN) $^	9	–	0	–	0	11	–	1	–	0
Bethel (MN)	7	–	2	–	0	8	–	2	–	0
Gustavus Adolphus	7	–	2	–	0	8	–	2	–	0
St. Thomas (MN)	7	–	2	–	0	7	–	3	–	0
Augsburg	5	–	4	–	0	6	–	4	–	0
Concordia–Moorhead	4	–	5	–	0	4	–	6	–	0
Hamline	2	–	7	–	0	2	–	8	–	0
St. Olaf	2	–	7	–	0	2	–	8	–	0
Carleton	1	–	8	–	0	2	–	8	–	0
Macalester	1	–	8	–	0	2	–	8	–	0
$ – Conference champion; ^ – NCAA Division III playoff participant

1999 Minnesota Intercollegiate Athletic Conference football standings
	Conf.					Overall
Team	W		L		T	W		L		T
Saint John's (MN) $^	8	–	1	–	0	11	–	2	–	0
Bethel (MN)	7	–	2	–	0	8	–	2	–	0
St. Thomas (MN)	7	–	2	–	0	7	–	3	–	0
Gustavus Adolphus	6	–	3	–	0	7	–	3	–	0
Concordia–Moorhead	6	–	3	–	0	6	–	4	–	0
Augsburg	5	–	4	–	0	6	–	4	–	0
St. Olaf	3	–	6	–	0	3	–	7	–	0
Carleton	1	–	8	–	0	2	–	8	–	0
Hamline	1	–	8	–	0	2	–	8	–	0
Macalester	1	–	8	–	0	2	–	8	–	0
$ – Conference champion; ^ – NCAA Division III playoff participant

2000 Minnesota Intercollegiate Athletic Conference football standings
	Conf.					Overall
Team	W		L		T	W		L		T
Bethel (MN) $^	9	–	0	–	0	10	–	1	–	0
Saint John's (MN) ^	8	–	1	–	0	13	–	2	–	0
St. Olaf	6	–	3	–	0	7	–	3	–	0
St. Thomas (MN)	6	–	3	–	0	6	–	4	–	0
Gustavus Adolphus	6	–	3	–	0	6	–	4	–	0
Concordia–Moorhead	4	–	5	–	0	4	–	6	–	0
Augsburg	3	–	6	–	0	3	–	7	–	0
Hamline	2	–	7	–	0	2	–	8	–	0
Carleton	1	–	8	–	0	1	–	9	–	0
Macalester	0	–	9	–	0	1	–	9	–	0
$ – Conference champion; ^ – NCAA Division III playoff participant

2001 Minnesota Intercollegiate Athletic Conference football standings
	Conf.			Overall
Team	W		L	W		L
Bethel (MN) +^	8	–	1	9	–	2
Saint John's (MN) +^	8	–	1	11	–	3
St. Thomas (MN)	7	–	2	7	–	3
Gustavus Adolphus	6	–	3	7	–	3
St. Olaf	5	–	4	6	–	4
Concordia–Moorhead	4	–	5	5	–	5
Augsburg	4	–	5	4	–	6
Hamline	2	–	7	2	–	8
Carleton	1	–	8	1	–	9
Macalester	0	–	9	0	–	10
+ – Conference co-champions; ^ – NCAA Division III playoff participant

2002 Minnesota Intercollegiate Athletic Conference football standings
	Conf.					Overall
Team	W		L		T	W		L		T
Saint John's (MN) $^	8	–	0	–	0	12	–	2	–	0
Concordia–Moorhead	7	–	1	–	0	7	–	3	–	0
Gustavus Adolphus	5	–	3	–	0	6	–	4	–	0
Bethel (MN)	5	–	3	–	0	5	–	5	–	0
St. Thomas (MN)	5	–	3	–	0	5	–	5	–	0
St. Olaf	3	–	5	–	0	5	–	5	–	0
Hamline	2	–	6	–	0	3	–	7	–	0
Augsburg	1	–	7	–	0	2	–	8	–	0
Carleton	0	–	8	–	0	0	–	10	–	0
$ – Conference champion; ^ – NCAA Division III playoff participant

2003 Minnesota Intercollegiate Athletic Conference football standings
	Conf.					Overall
Team	W		L		T	W		L		T
No. 1 Saint John's (MN) $^	8	–	0	–	0	14	–	0	–	0
No. 12 Bethel (MN) ^	7	–	1	–	0	9	–	2	–	0
Concordia–Moorhead	6	–	2	–	0	7	–	3	–	0
Augsburg	4	–	4	–	0	5	–	5	–	0
Gustavus Adolphus	4	–	4	–	0	4	–	6	–	0
St. Olaf	3	–	5	–	0	4	–	6	–	0
St. Thomas (MN)	3	–	5	–	0	3	–	7	–	0
Carleton	1	–	7	–	0	3	–	7	–	0
Hamline	0	–	8	–	0	2	–	8	–	0
$ – Conference champion; ^ – NCAA Division III playoff participant; Rankings from D3football.com

2004 Minnesota Intercollegiate Athletic Conference football standings
	Conf.					Overall
Team	W		L		T	W		L		T
No. 9 Concordia–Moorhead $^	8	–	0	–	0	11	–	1	–	0
St. Thomas (MN)	6	–	2	–	0	7	–	2	–	0
Saint John's (MN)	6	–	2	–	0	7	–	3	–	0
St. Olaf	5	–	3	–	0	7	–	3	–	0
Bethel (MN)	5	–	3	–	0	6	–	4	–	0
Gustavus Adolphus	2	–	6	–	0	2	–	8	–	0
Augsburg	2	–	6	–	0	2	–	8	–	0
Hamline	1	–	7	–	0	3	–	7	–	0
Carleton	1	–	7	–	0	2	–	8	–	0
$ – Conference champion; ^ – NCAA Division III playoff participant; Rankings from D3football.com

2005 Minnesota Intercollegiate Athletic Conference football standings
	Conf.			Overall
Team	W		L	W		L
No. 7 Saint John's (MN) $^	8	–	0	11	–	1
No. 8 Concordia–Moorhead ^	7	–	1	10	–	2
St. Olaf	6	–	2	8	–	2
Bethel (MN)	4	–	4	5	–	5
St. Thomas (MN)	4	–	4	4	–	5
Gustavus Adolphus	3	–	5	3	–	7
Carleton	2	–	6	4	–	6
Hamline	1	–	7	3	–	7
Augsburg	1	–	7	1	–	9
$ – Conference champion; ^ – NCAA Division III playoff participant; Rankings from D3football.com

2006 Minnesota Intercollegiate Athletic Conference football standings
	Conf.			Overall
Team	W		L	W		L
No. 5 Saint John's (MN) +^	7	–	1	11	–	2
No. 17 Bethel (MN) +^	7	–	1	9	–	2
St. Olaf	6	–	2	8	–	2
St. Thomas (MN)	5	–	3	6	–	4
Gustavus Adolphus	4	–	4	6	–	4
Concordia–Moorhead	3	–	5	4	–	6
Carleton	2	–	6	4	–	6
Hamline	1	–	7	3	–	7
Augsburg	1	–	7	1	–	9
+ – Conference co-champions; ^ – NCAA Division III playoff participant; Rankings from D3football.com

2007 Minnesota Intercollegiate Athletic Conference football standings
	Conf.			Overall
Team	W		L	W		L
No. 4 Bethel (MN) $^	8	–	0	12	–	2
No. 9 Saint John's (MN) ^	7	–	1	10	–	2
St. Olaf	6	–	2	8	–	2
Concordia–Moorhead	5	–	3	7	–	3
Augsburg	3	–	5	5	–	5
Gustavus Adolphus	3	–	5	5	–	5
St. Thomas (MN)	2	–	6	2	–	8
Carleton	1	–	7	3	–	7
Hamline	1	–	7	3	–	7
$ – Conference champion; ^ – NCAA Division III playoff participant; Rankings from D3football.com

2008 Minnesota Intercollegiate Athletic Conference football standings
	Conf.			Overall
Team	W		L	W		L
Saint John's (MN) $^	6	–	2	8	–	3
Carleton	5	–	3	7	–	3
St. Thomas (MN)	5	–	3	7	–	3
Concordia–Moorhead	5	–	3	6	–	4
Gustavus Adolphus	4	–	4	6	–	4
St. Olaf	4	–	4	6	–	4
Bethel (MN)	4	–	4	5	–	5
Augsburg	3	–	5	5	–	5
Hamline	0	–	8	2	–	8
$ – Conference champion; ^ – NCAA Division III playoff participant

2009 Minnesota Intercollegiate Athletic Conference football standings
	Conf.			Overall
Team	W		L	W		L
No. 12 Saint John's (MN) $^	8	–	0	10	–	1
No. 5 St. Thomas (MN) ^	7	–	1	11	–	2
Bethel (MN)	6	–	2	7	–	3
Concordia–Moorhead	3	–	5	5	–	5
St. Olaf	3	–	5	5	–	5
Augsburg	3	–	5	4	–	6
Gustavus Adolphus	3	–	5	4	–	6
Hamline	2	–	6	4	–	6
Carleton	1	–	7	3	–	7
$ – Conference champion; ^ – NCAA Division III playoff participant; Rankings from D3football.com

2010 Minnesota Intercollegiate Athletic Conference football standings
	Conf.			Overall
Team	W		L	W		L
No. 7 St. Thomas (MN) $^	8	–	0	12	–	1
No. 6 Bethel (MN) ^	7	–	1	12	–	2
Saint John's (MN)	6	–	2	7	–	3
St. Olaf	4	–	4	6	–	4
Concordia–Moorhead	4	–	4	5	–	5
Gustavus Adolphus	3	–	5	4	–	6
Augsburg	2	–	6	4	–	6
Carleton	2	–	6	3	–	7
Hamline	0	–	8	1	–	9
$ – Conference champion; ^ – NCAA Division III playoff participant; Rankings from D3football.com

2011 Minnesota Intercollegiate Athletic Conference football standings
	Conf.			Overall
Team	W		L	W		L
No. 4 St. Thomas (MN) $^	8	–	0	13	–	1
No. 25 Bethel (MN)	6	–	2	8	–	2
St. Olaf	6	–	2	8	–	2
Saint John's (MN)	5	–	3	6	–	4
Augsburg	4	–	4	6	–	4
Concordia–Moorhead	4	–	4	6	–	4
Gustavus Adolphus	2	–	6	2	–	8
Carleton	1	–	7	2	–	8
Hamline	0	–	8	0	–	10
$ – Conference champion; ^ – NCAA Division III playoff participant; Rankings from D3football.com

2012 Minnesota Intercollegiate Athletic Conference football standings
	Conf.			Overall
Team	W		L	W		L
No. 3 St. Thomas (MN) $^	8	–	0	14	–	1
No. 18 Concordia–Moorhead	6	–	2	8	–	2
No. 12 Bethel (MN) ^	6	–	2	9	–	3
Augsburg	5	–	3	7	–	3
St. Olaf	5	–	3	7	–	3
Saint John's (MN)	3	–	5	5	–	5
Gustavus Adolphus	2	–	6	3	–	7
Carleton	1	–	7	3	–	7
Hamline	0	–	8	1	–	9
$ – Conference champion; ^ – NCAA Division III playoff participant; Rankings from D3football.com

2013 Minnesota Intercollegiate Athletic Conference football standings
	Conf.			Overall
Team	W		L	W		L
No. 6 Bethel (MN) $^	8	–	0	12	–	1
Concordia–Moorhead	6	–	2	8	–	2
No. 20 St. Thomas (MN)	6	–	2	8	–	2
Saint John's (MN)	5	–	3	7	–	3
Gustavus Adolphus	4	–	4	6	–	4
Augsburg	3	–	5	5	–	5
Carleton	3	–	5	5	–	5
Hamline	1	–	7	2	–	8
St. Olaf	0	–	8	1	–	9
$ – Conference champion; ^ – NCAA Division III playoff participant; Rankings from D3football.com

2014 Minnesota Intercollegiate Athletic Conference football standings
	Conf.			Overall
Team	W		L	W		L
No. 12 Saint John's (MN) $^	7	–	1	10	–	2
Concordia–Moorhead	6	–	2	8	–	2
No. 16 St. Thomas (MN) ^	6	–	2	8	–	3
Bethel (MN)	6	–	2	7	–	3
Gustavus Adolphus	4	–	4	6	–	4
Augsburg	3	–	5	4	–	6
Hamline	2	–	6	4	–	6
Carleton	1	–	7	2	–	8
St. Olaf	1	–	7	1	–	9
$ – Conference champion; ^ – NCAA Division III playoff participant; Rankings from D3football.com

2015 Minnesota Intercollegiate Athletic Conference football standings
	Conf.			Overall
Team	W		L	W		L
No. 2 St. Thomas (MN) $^	8	–	0	14	–	1
No. 10 Saint John's (MN) ^	7	–	1	10	–	2
Concordia–Moorhead	5	–	3	7	–	3
Gustavus Adolphus	5	–	3	7	–	3
Augsburg	4	–	4	5	–	5
Bethel (MN)	4	–	4	5	–	5
Hamline	2	–	6	4	–	6
St. Olaf	1	–	7	2	–	8
Carleton	0	–	8	1	–	9
$ – Conference champion; ^ – NCAA Division III playoff participant; Rankings from D3football.com

2016 Minnesota Intercollegiate Athletic Conference football standings
	Conf.			Overall
Team	W		L	W		L
No. 6 St. Thomas (MN) $^	8	–	0	12	–	1
No. 9 Saint John's (MN) ^	7	–	1	10	–	2
Concordia–Moorhead	6	–	2	7	–	3
Bethel (MN)	5	–	3	5	–	5
Gustavus Adolphus	3	–	5	5	–	5
Hamline	3	–	5	5	–	5
Augsburg	2	–	6	2	–	8
St. Olaf	1	–	7	2	–	8
Carleton	1	–	7	1	–	9
$ – Conference champion; ^ – NCAA Division III playoff participant; Rankings from D3football.com

2017 Minnesota Intercollegiate Athletic Conference football standings
	Conf.			Overall
Team	W		L	W		L
No. 4 St. Thomas (MN) $^	8	–	0	11	–	2
No. 14 Saint John's (MN) ^	7	–	1	9	–	2
No. 21 Concordia–Moorhead	6	–	2	8	–	2
Bethel (MN)	5	–	3	5	–	5
Gustavus Adolphus	4	–	4	5	–	5
St. Olaf	3	–	5	4	–	6
Augsburg	2	–	6	4	–	6
Hamline	1	–	7	2	–	8
Carleton	0	–	8	0	–	10
$ – Conference champion; ^ – NCAA Division III playoff participant; Rankings from D3football.com

2018 Minnesota Intercollegiate Athletic Conference football standings
	Conf.			Overall
Team	W		L	W		L
No. 3 Saint John's (MN) $^	8	–	0	12	–	1
No. 7 Bethel (MN) ^	7	–	1	11	–	2
No. 15 St. Thomas (MN)	6	–	2	8	–	2
Gustavus Adolphus	5	–	3	6	–	4
Concordia–Moorhead	4	–	4	5	–	5
St. Olaf	3	–	5	5	–	5
Carleton	2	–	6	3	–	7
Hamline	1	–	7	1	–	9
Augsburg	0	–	8	2	–	8
$ – Conference champion; ^ – NCAA Division III playoff participant; Rankings from D3football.com

2019 Minnesota Intercollegiate Athletic Conference football standings
	Conf.			Overall
Team	W		L	W		L
No. 4 Saint John's (MN) +^	7	–	1	12	–	2
No. 15 St. Thomas (MN) +	7	–	1	8	–	2
No. 23 Bethel (MN)	6	–	2	8	–	2
Gustavus Adolphus	5	–	3	7	–	3
Concordia–Moorhead	5	–	3	5	–	5
St. Olaf	3	–	5	5	–	5
Carleton	2	–	6	4	–	6
Augsburg	1	–	7	2	–	8
Hamline	0	–	8	1	–	9
+ – Conference co-champions; ^ – NCAA Division III playoff participant; Rankings from D3football.com
