= 1883 Lewisburg football team =

American college football season

1883 Lewisburg football
- Conference: Independent
- Record: 0–1
- Head coach: None
- Captain: Carl Law

1883 college football records
	Conf.			Overall
Team	W	L	T	W		L		T
Yale		–		9	–	0	–	0
Gallaudet		–		2	–	0	–	0
Carleton		–		1	–	0	–	0
Johns Hopkins		–		1	–	0	–	0
NYU		–		1	–	0	–	0
Harvard		–		8	–	2	–	0
Princeton		–		7	–	1	–	0
Penn		–		6	–	2	–	1
Stevens		–		6	–	4	–	1
Massachusetts		–		1	–	1	–	0
Minnesota		–		1	–	1	–	0
Wesleyan		–		3	–	3	–	0
Williams		–		1	–	1	–	0
Fordham		–		4	–	5	–	0
Michigan		–		2	–	3	–	0
Lafayette		–		2	–	4	–	0
Johns Hopkins		–		1	–	2	–	0
Columbia		–		1	–	3	–	0
Rutgers		–		1	–	6	–	0
Amherst		–		0	–	1	–	0
Dartmouth		–		0	–	1	–	0
Hamline		–		0	–	1	–	0
Lewisburg		–		0	–	1	–	0
Navy		–		0	–	1	–	0
CCNY		–		0	–	2	–	0
Columbian University		–		0	–	2	–	0
Georgetown		–		0	–	2	–	0

The 1883 Lewisburg football team represented the University at Lewisburg—now known as Bucknell University—during the 1883 college football season. The team lost its only game to Lafayette. There was no head coach and the captain was Carl Law.

== Schedule ==
Date	Time	Opponent	Site	Result	Source
November 29	2:00 p.m.	Lafayette	Lewisburg, PA	L 0–59	

Excerpts from an account of the only game stated:

"...At this point the time for the first inning was up, and a breathing spell of fifteen minutes was given. At the beginning of the second inning, the University team came up somewhat discouraged, but nevertheless determined to make the other side work for whatever they might secure. They now used several of Lafayette's tricks with good result, and showed that it was but want of skill and practice that they had worked so disastrously in the first part of the game. For a full fifteen minutes, the ball was carried about the field without either side gaining a single point."
