= 1883 Yale Bulldogs football team =

American college football season

1883 Yale Bulldogs football
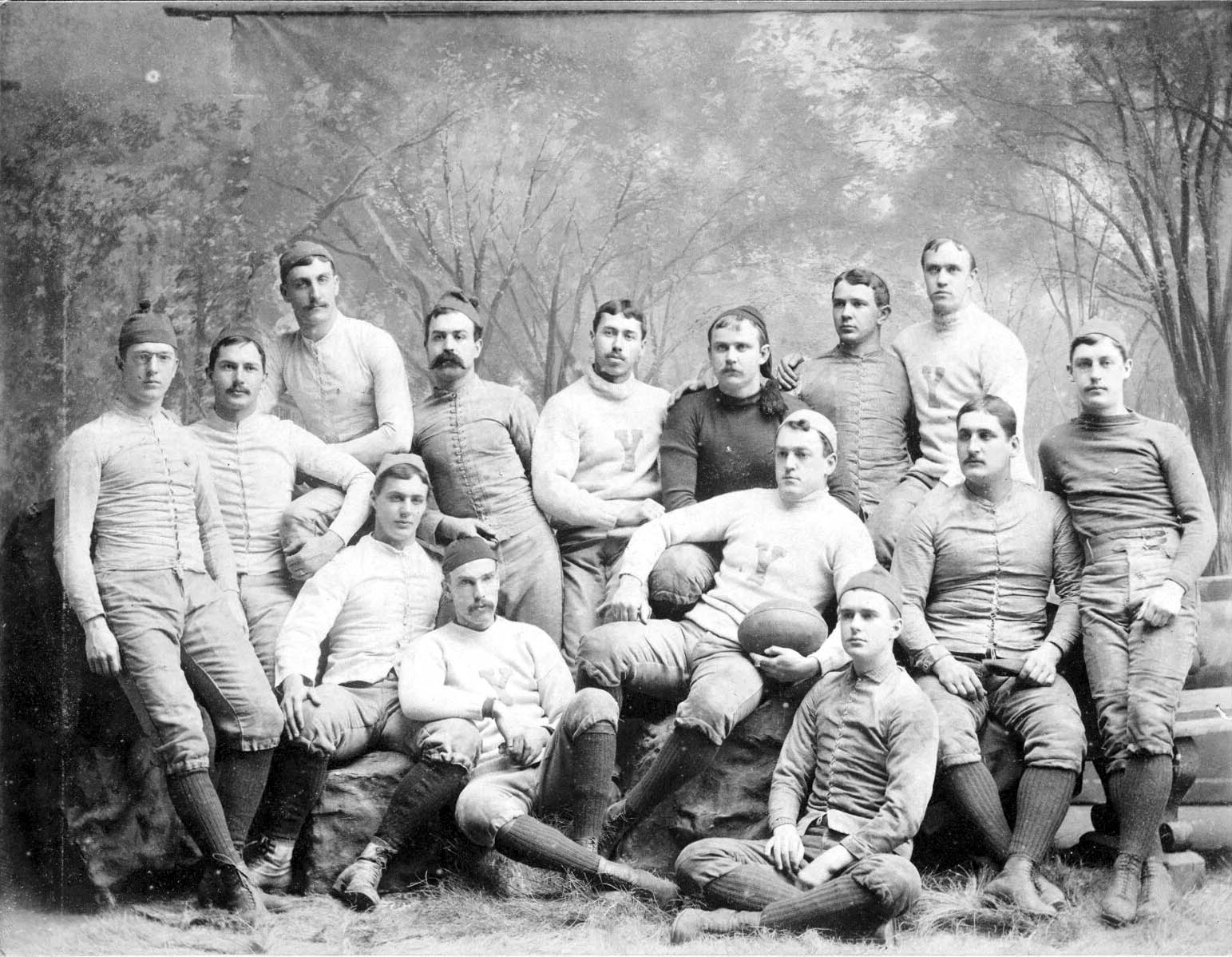

National champion
- Conference: Independent
- Record: 9–0
- Head coach: None
- Captain: Ray Tompkins
- Home stadium: Hamilton Park

1883 college football records
	Conf.			Overall
Team	W	L	T	W		L		T
Yale		–		9	–	0	–	0
Gallaudet		–		2	–	0	–	0
Carleton		–		1	–	0	–	0
Johns Hopkins		–		1	–	0	–	0
NYU		–		1	–	0	–	0
Harvard		–		8	–	2	–	0
Princeton		–		7	–	1	–	0
Penn		–		6	–	2	–	1
Stevens		–		6	–	4	–	1
Massachusetts		–		1	–	1	–	0
Minnesota		–		1	–	1	–	0
Wesleyan		–		3	–	3	–	0
Williams		–		1	–	1	–	0
Fordham		–		4	–	5	–	0
Michigan		–		2	–	3	–	0
Lafayette		–		2	–	4	–	0
Johns Hopkins		–		1	–	2	–	0
Columbia		–		1	–	3	–	0
Rutgers		–		1	–	6	–	0
Amherst		–		0	–	1	–	0
Dartmouth		–		0	–	1	–	0
Hamline		–		0	–	1	–	0
Lewisburg		–		0	–	1	–	0
Navy		–		0	–	1	–	0
CCNY		–		0	–	2	–	0
Columbian University		–		0	–	2	–	0
Georgetown		–		0	–	2	–	0

The 1883 Yale Bulldogs football team represented Yale University in the 1883 college football season. The team compiled a 9–0 record, shut out eight of nine opponents, and outscored all opponents, 540 to 2. The team was retroactively named as the national champion by the Helms Athletic Foundation, Billingsley Report, National Championship Foundation and Parke H. Davis.

== Schedule ==
Date	Time	Opponent	Site	Result	Attendance	Source
September 26		Wesleyan	Hamilton Park; New Haven, CT	W 58–0		
September 29		at Wesleyan	Middletown, CT	W 90–0		
October 6		Stevens	Hamilton Park; New Haven, CT	W 59–0		
November 6	3:20 p.m.	vs. Rutgers	Washington Park; Brooklyn, NY	W 92–0	nearly 1,000	
November 14		Brooklyn Polytechnic Institute	Brooklyn, NY	W 49–0		
November 17		vs. Columbia	Polo Grounds; New York, NY	W 93–0	400–500	
November 21		Michigan	Hamilton Park; New Haven, CT	W 64–0	400	
November 24	2:15 p.m.	vs. Princeton	Polo Grounds; New York, NY (rivalry)	W 6–0	5,000–6,000	
November 29	2:37 p.m.	vs. Harvard	Polo Grounds; New York, NY (rivalry)	W 23–2	nearly 10,000	

== Roster ==
- Rushers: Samuel Reading Bertron (4), Howard H. Knapp, F. G. Peters (4), Ray Tompkins, A. L. Farwell (4), Williams (4), Louis K. Hull, W. P. McCrorey
- Quarterback: Henry Twombly (4)
- Halfbacks: Wyllys Terry, Eugene Lamb Richards
- Back: Benjamin Wisner Bacon
