= 1883 Lafayette football team =

American college football season

1883 Lafayette football
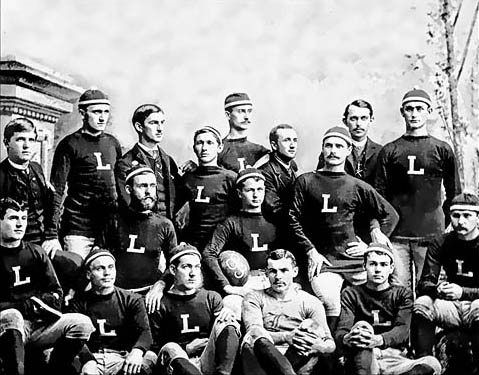
- Conference: Independent
- Record: 2–4
- Head coach: None
- Captain: Theodore Welles
- Home stadium: The Quad

1883 college football records
	Conf.			Overall
Team	W	L	T	W		L		T
Yale		–		9	–	0	–	0
Gallaudet		–		2	–	0	–	0
Carleton		–		1	–	0	–	0
Johns Hopkins		–		1	–	0	–	0
NYU		–		1	–	0	–	0
Harvard		–		8	–	2	–	0
Princeton		–		7	–	1	–	0
Penn		–		6	–	2	–	1
Stevens		–		6	–	4	–	1
Massachusetts		–		1	–	1	–	0
Minnesota		–		1	–	1	–	0
Wesleyan		–		3	–	3	–	0
Williams		–		1	–	1	–	0
Fordham		–		4	–	5	–	0
Michigan		–		2	–	3	–	0
Lafayette		–		2	–	4	–	0
Johns Hopkins		–		1	–	2	–	0
Columbia		–		1	–	3	–	0
Rutgers		–		1	–	6	–	0
Amherst		–		0	–	1	–	0
Dartmouth		–		0	–	1	–	0
Hamline		–		0	–	1	–	0
Lewisburg		–		0	–	1	–	0
Navy		–		0	–	1	–	0
CCNY		–		0	–	2	–	0
Columbian University		–		0	–	2	–	0
Georgetown		–		0	–	2	–	0

The 1883 Lafayette football team was an American football team that represented Lafayette College as an independent during the 1883 college football season. Playing without a regular coach, the team compiled a 2–4 record and was outscored by a total of 126 to 110. Theodore Welles was the team captain, and F. Drake was the manager. The team played its home games on The Quad in Easton, Pennsylvania.

== Schedule ==
Date	Time	Opponent	Site	Result	Source
October 22		at Princeton	Princeton, NJ	L 6–53	
October 27		at Penn	Recreation Park; Philadelphia, PA	L 6–44	
November 3		Stevens	Easton, PA	L 4–14	
November 10		Rutgers	Easton, PA	W 25–0	
November 26		at Stevens	Hoboken, NJ	L 11–14	
November 29	2:00 p.m.	at Lewisburg	Lewisburg, PA	W 59–0	
