= 1883 Columbia football team =

American college football season

1883 Columbia football
- Conference: Independent
- Record: 1–3
- Head coach: None
- Captain: W. N. Eldridge
- Home stadium: Polo Grounds

1883 college football records
	Conf.			Overall
Team	W	L	T	W		L		T
Yale		–		9	–	0	–	0
Gallaudet		–		2	–	0	–	0
Carleton		–		1	–	0	–	0
Johns Hopkins		–		1	–	0	–	0
NYU		–		1	–	0	–	0
Harvard		–		8	–	2	–	0
Princeton		–		7	–	1	–	0
Penn		–		6	–	2	–	1
Stevens		–		6	–	4	–	1
Massachusetts		–		1	–	1	–	0
Minnesota		–		1	–	1	–	0
Wesleyan		–		3	–	3	–	0
Williams		–		1	–	1	–	0
Fordham		–		4	–	5	–	0
Michigan		–		2	–	3	–	0
Lafayette		–		2	–	4	–	0
Johns Hopkins		–		1	–	2	–	0
Columbia		–		1	–	3	–	0
Rutgers		–		1	–	6	–	0
Amherst		–		0	–	1	–	0
Dartmouth		–		0	–	1	–	0
Hamline		–		0	–	1	–	0
Lewisburg		–		0	–	1	–	0
Navy		–		0	–	1	–	0
CCNY		–		0	–	2	–	0
Columbian University		–		0	–	2	–	0
Georgetown		–		0	–	2	–	0

The 1883 Columbia football team was an American football team that represented Columbia University as an independent during the 1883 college football season. The team compiled a 1–3 record and was outscored by a total of 147 to 13. The team had no coach. W. N. Eldridge was the team captain.

== Schedule ==
Date	Opponent	Site	Result	Source
October 20	CCNY	Central Park; New York, NY	W 12–0	
October 27	at Stevens	Hoboken, NJ	L 0–19	
November 14	at Penn	Recreation Park; Philadelphia, PA	L 1–35	
November 17	Yale	Polo Grounds; New York, NY	L 0–93	
