= 1883 Gallaudet Bison football team =

American college football season

1883 Gallaudet Bison football
- Conference: Independent
- Record: 2–0
- Head coach: John B. Hotchkiss (1st season)
- Home stadium: Kendall Green

1883 college football records
	Conf.			Overall
Team	W	L	T	W		L		T
Yale		–		9	–	0	–	0
Gallaudet		–		2	–	0	–	0
Carleton		–		1	–	0	–	0
Johns Hopkins		–		1	–	0	–	0
NYU		–		1	–	0	–	0
Harvard		–		8	–	2	–	0
Princeton		–		7	–	1	–	0
Penn		–		6	–	2	–	1
Stevens		–		6	–	4	–	1
Massachusetts		–		1	–	1	–	0
Minnesota		–		1	–	1	–	0
Wesleyan		–		3	–	3	–	0
Williams		–		1	–	1	–	0
Fordham		–		4	–	5	–	0
Michigan		–		2	–	3	–	0
Lafayette		–		2	–	4	–	0
Johns Hopkins		–		1	–	2	–	0
Columbia		–		1	–	3	–	0
Rutgers		–		1	–	6	–	0
Amherst		–		0	–	1	–	0
Dartmouth		–		0	–	1	–	0
Hamline		–		0	–	1	–	0
Lewisburg		–		0	–	1	–	0
Navy		–		0	–	1	–	0
CCNY		–		0	–	2	–	0
Columbian University		–		0	–	2	–	0
Georgetown		–		0	–	2	–	0

The 1883 Gallaudet Bison football team represented the Gallaudet University, a college for deaf people, during the 1883 college football season. In the team's inaugural season, it defeated Georgetown twice. The players sewed their own uniforms, made of heavy canvas with black and white stripes.

== Schedule ==
Date	Opponent	Site	Result
November 20	Georgetown	Kendall Green; Washington, DC	W 13–0
November 29	Georgetown	Kendall Green; Washington, DC	W 15–0

== See also ==
- List of the first college football game in each US state
