= 1883 Minnesota Golden Gophers football team =

American college football season

1883 Minnesota Golden Gophers football
- Conference: Independent
- Record: 1–2
- Head coach: Thomas Peebles (1st season)
- Captain: John W. Adams

1883 college football records
	Conf.			Overall
Team	W	L	T	W		L		T
Yale		–		9	–	0	–	0
Gallaudet		–		2	–	0	–	0
Carleton		–		1	–	0	–	0
Johns Hopkins		–		1	–	0	–	0
NYU		–		1	–	0	–	0
Harvard		–		8	–	2	–	0
Princeton		–		7	–	1	–	0
Penn		–		6	–	2	–	1
Stevens		–		6	–	4	–	1
Massachusetts		–		1	–	1	–	0
Minnesota		–		1	–	1	–	0
Wesleyan		–		3	–	3	–	0
Williams		–		1	–	1	–	0
Fordham		–		4	–	5	–	0
Michigan		–		2	–	3	–	0
Lafayette		–		2	–	4	–	0
Johns Hopkins		–		1	–	2	–	0
Columbia		–		1	–	3	–	0
Rutgers		–		1	–	6	–	0
Amherst		–		0	–	1	–	0
Dartmouth		–		0	–	1	–	0
Hamline		–		0	–	1	–	0
Lewisburg		–		0	–	1	–	0
Navy		–		0	–	1	–	0
CCNY		–		0	–	2	–	0
Columbian University		–		0	–	2	–	0
Georgetown		–		0	–	2	–	0

The 1883 Minnesota Golden Gophers football team represented the University of Minnesota during the 1883 college football season. The season was the only season under head coach Thomas Peebles, the first coach in the history of the program. He came to the university to teach philosophy and since he had played football with distinction at Princeton University, he was recruited to coach the football team. He was described as "having a twinkling eye, a moustache, winged collars and the bearing of a scholar so that even on the field of play he looked as though he were en route to the court of St. James."

Upon arrival in Northfield, Minnesota for the first game of the year, there was a dispute between the arriving players from Minnesota and the team representing Carleton College. Carleton insisted that a member of the faculty be allowed to play, and they also insisted on playing rugby style football. Coach Peebles preferred the soccer style of play, but agreed to the conditions as long as he could act as the referee. Carleton won the game 4–2.

Team of 1883: J.W. Adams (captain), Don Davidson, Mitchell, Blanding, Niles, Winchell, Graham, McNair, Bassett, Smith, Hammond, Crafts."

== Schedule ==
Date	Opponent	Site	Result
October 29	at Carleton	Northfield, MN	L 2–4
November 3	vs. Hamline	Saint Paul, MN	W 5–0
November 10	Ex-Collegiates	Minneapolis, MN	L 2–4
