= Bob Sullivan (American football coach) =

American football coach (born c. 1937)

Biographical details
- Born: c. 1937 (age 88–89)
- Education: Saint John's University (1959); Wisconsin State College–River Falls

Playing career
- 1955–1956: Saint John's (MN)

Coaching career (HC unless noted)
- 1957: Saint John's (MN) (assistant freshman)
- 1958: Saint John's (MN) (freshman)
- 1959–1969: Hill HS (MN)
- 1970–1978: Cooper HS (MN)
- 1979–2000: Carleton
- 2001–2018: Northfield HS (MN) (volunteer)

Head coaching record
- Overall: 101–114 (college)
- Tournaments: 0–1 (NCAA D-III playoffs)

Accomplishments and honors

Championships
- 1 MWC Blue Division (1979); 1 MIAC (1992)

Awards
- MIAC (1992); Carleton 'C' Club (2002)

Robert Sullivan (born c. 1937) is an American former college football coach. He was the head football coach for Carleton College from 1979 to 2000.

== Career ==
Sullivan played college football for Saint John's for his freshman and sophomore year.

As a junior at Saint John's in 1957, Sullivan was told by coach John Gagliardi that he would be better off as a coach rather than a player, so he helped coach the freshman football team. As a senior in 1958, he was the head freshman coach. In 1959, he began his high school coaching career as the head football coach for Hill High School. He led the school to two state championships and were runner-ups four times. After eleven seasons, in 1970 he became the head football coach for Cooper High School. He ended his tenure with Cooper winning twenty of his last 23 games. In 1979, he was hired as the head football coach for Carleton. In 22 seasons as head coach he led the school to a 101–114 record. In 1979 he led the team to a Midwest Conference (MWC) Blue Division title. In 1992, he had his best season as he finished the year going 9–2 and won the Minnesota Intercollegiate Athletic Conference (MIAC) alongside a trip to the NCAA Division III playoffs. He resigned following the 2000 season. From 2001 to 2018 he served as a volunteer assistant coach under his son for Northfield High School.

== Honors ==
In 2002, Sullivan was inducted into the Carleton 'C' Club.

In 2022, Carleton's football field was renamed in Sullivan's honor to Bob Sullivan Field.

== Head coaching record ==
=== College ===
Year	Team	Overall	Conference	Standing	Bowl/playoffs
Carleton Knights (Midwest Conference) (1979–1981)
1979	Carleton	4–5	4–0	1st (Blue)	
1980	Carleton	6–3	6–2	3rd	
1981	Carleton	7–2	6–2	T–2nd	
Carleton Knights (Midwest Conference / Minnesota Intercollegiate Athletic Conference) (1982)
1982	Carleton	6–2	4–1 / 0–0	2nd (South) / N/A (Note: Ineligible for conference title)	
Carleton Knights (Minnesota Intercollegiate Athletic Conference) (1983–2000)
1983	Carleton	2–8	1–8	10th	
1984	Carleton	3–7	2–6	8th	
1985	Carleton	5–5	4–5	T–5th	
1986	Carleton	7–3	6–3	T–3rd	
1987	Carleton	6–4	5–4	T–4th	
1988	Carleton	7–3	6–3	4th	
1989	Carleton	7–3	6–3	3rd	
1990	Carleton	5–5	5–4	6th	
1991	Carleton	5–5	3–5	T–7th	
1992	Carleton	9–2	8–1	1st	L NCAA Division III First Round
1993	Carleton	6–4	5–4	5th	
1994	Carleton	3–7	3–6	8th	
1995	Carleton	3–7	3–6	8th	
1996	Carleton	5–5	4–5	T–5th	
1997	Carleton	2–8	1–8	9th	
1998	Carleton	2–8	1–8	T–9th	
1999	Carleton	2–8	1–8	T–8th	
2000	Carleton	1–9	1–8	9th	
Carleton:		101–114	81–99		
Total:		101–114			
National championship Conference title Conference division title or championship game berth
