= 1883 college football season =

American college football season

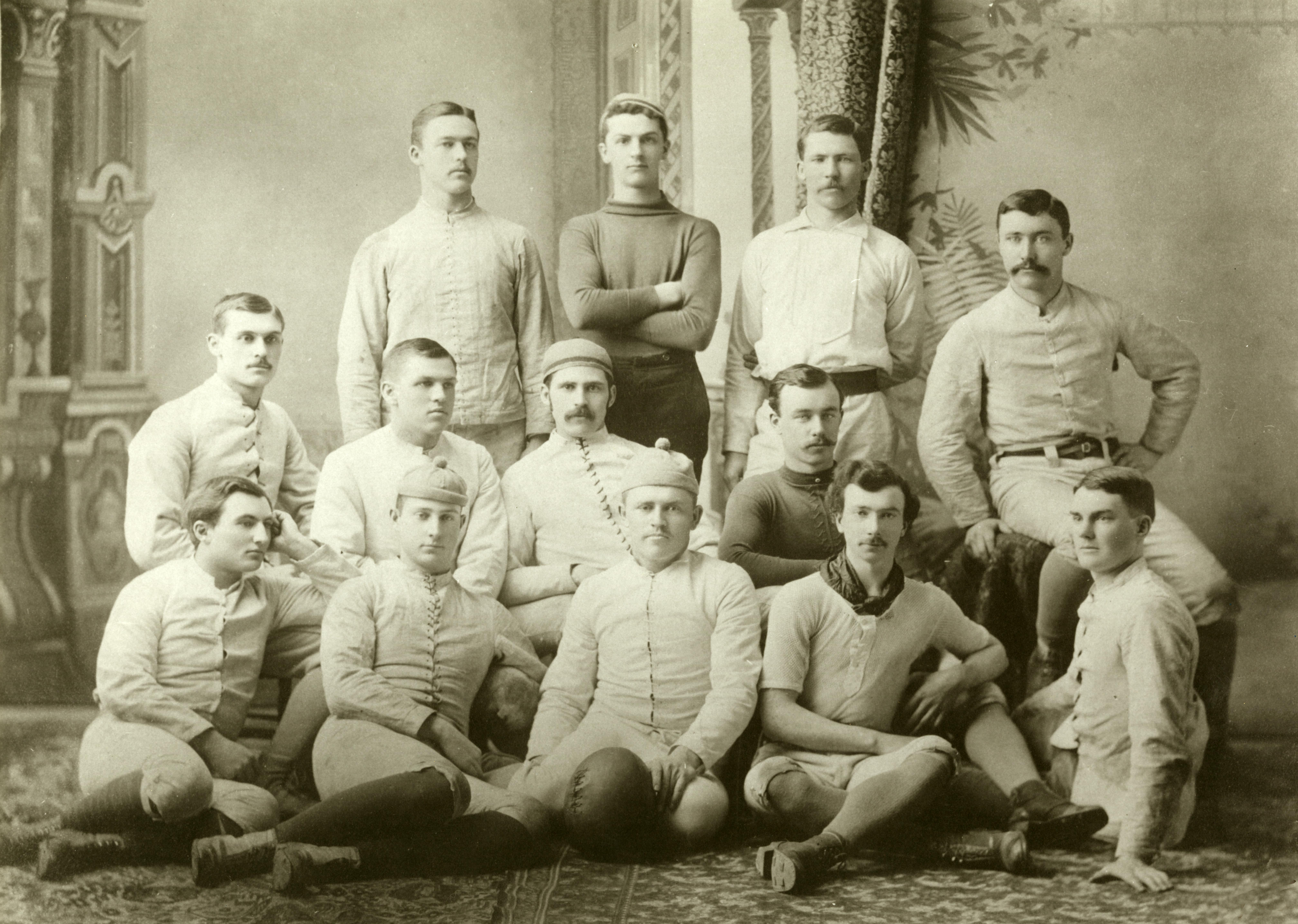
- 1883 Michigan Wolverines
- Total No. of teams: 10
- Regular season: March 12; September 26 to November 30
- Champion: Yale

The 1883 college football season had no clear-cut champion, with the Official NCAA Division I Football Records Book listing Yale as having been selected national champions.

== Conference and program changes ==
| Team | Former conference | New conference |
|---|---|---|
| Gallaudet Bison | Program established | Independent |
| Carleton Knights | Program established | Independent |
| Williams Ephs | Program established | Independent |
| Hamline Pipers | Program established | Independent |

== Conference standings ==
1883 college football records
| | Conf. | | | Overall |
| Team | W | L | T | W | | L | | T |
|---|---|---|---|---|---|---|---|---|
| Yale | | – | | 9 | – | 0 | – | 0 |
| Gallaudet | | – | | 2 | – | 0 | – | 0 |
| Carleton | | – | | 1 | – | 0 | – | 0 |
| Johns Hopkins | | – | | 1 | – | 0 | – | 0 |
| NYU | | – | | 1 | – | 0 | – | 0 |
| Harvard | | – | | 8 | – | 2 | – | 0 |
| Princeton | | – | | 7 | – | 1 | – | 0 |
| Penn | | – | | 6 | – | 2 | – | 1 |
| Stevens | | – | | 6 | – | 4 | – | 1 |
| Massachusetts | | – | | 1 | – | 1 | – | 0 |
| Minnesota | | – | | 1 | – | 1 | – | 0 |
| Wesleyan | | – | | 3 | – | 3 | – | 0 |
| Williams | | – | | 1 | – | 1 | – | 0 |
| Fordham | | – | | 4 | – | 5 | – | 0 |
| Michigan | | – | | 2 | – | 3 | – | 0 |
| Lafayette | | – | | 2 | – | 4 | – | 0 |
| Johns Hopkins | | – | | 1 | – | 2 | – | 0 |
| Columbia | | – | | 1 | – | 3 | – | 0 |
| Rutgers | | – | | 1 | – | 6 | – | 0 |
| Amherst | | – | | 0 | – | 1 | – | 0 |
| Dartmouth | | – | | 0 | – | 1 | – | 0 |
| Hamline | | – | | 0 | – | 1 | – | 0 |
| Lewisburg | | – | | 0 | – | 1 | – | 0 |
| Navy | | – | | 0 | – | 1 | – | 0 |
| CCNY | | – | | 0 | – | 2 | – | 0 |
| Columbian University | | – | | 0 | – | 2 | – | 0 |
| Georgetown | | – | | 0 | – | 2 | – | 0 |

== Statistical leaders ==
- Player scoring most points: Alex Moffat, Princeton, 136
