= D. C. Mitchell =

American football and basketball player and coach

Biographical details
- Born: January 3, 1888; Hiawatha, Kansas, U.S.

Playing career

Basketball
- 1909–1910: Nebraska

Coaching career (HC unless noted)

Football
- 1922–1925: Gustavus Adolphus
- 1926–1930: Hamline
- 1937–1941: Macalester (assistant)
- 1945: Macalester

Basketball
- 1921–1926: Gustavus Adolphus
- 1926–1930: Hamline

Baseball
- 1923–1924: Gustavus Adolphus

Administrative career (AD unless noted)
- 1922–1926: Gustavus Adolphus
- 1926–1930: Hamline

Head coaching record
- Overall: 24–38–5 (football); 4–7 (baseball)

D. C. Mitchell (born January 3, 1888) was an American college football and basketball player and coach. He served as the head football coach at Gustavus Adolphus College in St. Peter, Minnesota from 1922 to 1925, Hamline University in Saint Paul, Minnesota from 1926 to 1930, and Macalester College in Saint Paul in 1945.

== Head coaching record ==
=== Football ===
Year	Team	Overall	Conference	Standing	Bowl/playoffs
Gustavus Adolphus Gusties (Minnesota Intercollegiate Athletic Conference) (1922–1925)
1922	Gustavus Adolphus	0–4–1	0–4	T–7th	
1923	Gustavus Adolphus	2–5	1–4	8th	
1924	Gustavus Adolphus	2–4–1	2–2–1	4th	
1925	Gustavus Adolphus	5–1	3–1	2nd	
Gustavus Adolphus:		9–14–2	6–11–1		
Hamline Pipers (Midwest Conference / Minnesota Intercollegiate Athletic Conference) (1926–1929)
1926	Hamline	4–4	1–1 / 3–2	T–4th / 3rd	
1927	Hamline	2–4–1	1–1 / 1–2–1	T–4th / 5th	
1928	Hamline	4–3–1	1–0 / 3–2–1	2nd / 4th	
1929	Hamline	2–6	0–2 / 2–4	T–7th / T–6th	
Hamline Pipers (Minnesota Intercollegiate Athletic Conference) (1930)
1930	Hamline	0–6–1	0–4–1	T–7th	
Hamline:		12–23–3	12–18–3		
Macalester Scots (Minnesota Intercollegiate Athletic Conference) (1945)
1945	Macalester	3–1	2–1	3rd	
Macalester:		3–1	2–1		
Total:		24–38–5			
