= 1992 Carleton Knights football team =

American college football season

1992 Carleton Knights football

MIAC champion

NCAA Division III First Round, L 8–20 at Central (IA)
- Conference: Minnesota Intercollegiate Athletic Conference
- Record: 9–2 (8–1 MIAC)
- Head coach: Bob Sullivan (14th season)
- Defensive coordinator: Gerald Young (1st season)
- Home stadium: Laird Stadium

1992 Minnesota Intercollegiate Athletic Conference football standings
	Conf.					Overall
Team	W		L		T	W		L		T
Carleton $^	8	–	1	–	0	9	–	2	–	0
Saint John's (MN)	7	–	1	–	1	8	–	1	–	1
Concordia–Moorhead	6	–	2	–	1	7	–	2	–	1
Hamline	5	–	4	–	0	6	–	4	–	0
Bethel (MN)	5	–	4	–	0	5	–	5	–	0
Gustavus Adolphus	4	–	5	–	0	4	–	6	–	0
St. Olaf	4	–	5	–	0	4	–	6	–	0
St. Thomas (MN)	3	–	6	–	0	3	–	7	–	0
Augsburg	2	–	7	–	0	3	–	7	–	0
Macalester	0	–	9	–	0	0	–	10	–	0
$ – Conference champion; ^ – NCAA Division III playoff participant

The 1992 Carleton Knights football team represented Carleton College in the 1992 NCAA Division III football season. Bob Sullivan returned as the head coach, and Gerald Young was hired as the team's new defensive coordinator. The team compiled a 9–1 record and won the Minnesota Intercollegiate Athletic Conference (MIAC) championship, but lost to the Central Dutch in the first round of the NCAA Division III playoffs.

The Knights had 19 players return from the 1991 season, with Scott Hanks moving from running back to tight end.

The team scored 287 points (including 34 touchdowns and eight field goals) and totaled 3,757 yards of total offense in 10 regular season games, consisting of 1,732 rushing yards and 2,025 passing yards. It totaled 4,892 all-purpose yards. On defense, the team totaled a school record 1,034 tackles, including 107 tackles for loss. It also recorded 41 quarterback sacks and 17 interceptions for a school record 288 interception return yards.

== Schedule ==
Date	Opponent	Site	Result
September 12	at Northwestern (MN)*	Roseville, MN	W 49–3
September 19	Hamline	Laird Stadium; Northfield, MN	W 36–0
September 26	at Bethel (MN)	Royal Stadium; Arden Hills, MN	W 24–14
October 3	St. Thomas (MN)^{†}	Laird Stadium; Northfield, MN	W 25–20
October 10	at Macalester	Macalester Stadium; St. Paul, Minnesota	W 32–6
October 17	St. Olaf	Laird Stadium; Northfield, MN	W 21–9
October 24	Concordia–Moorhead	Laird Stadium; Northfield, MN	W 26–24
October 31	at Augsburg	Edor Nelson Field; Minneapolis, MN	W 38–28
November 7	vs. Saint John's (MN)	Hubert H. Humphrey Metrodome; Minneapolis, MN	L 7–70
November 13	vs. Gustavus Adolphus	Hubert H. Humphrey Metrodome; Minneapolis, MN	W 21–20
November 21	at Central (IA)*	Pella, IA	L 8–20
*Non-conference game; ^{†}Homecoming

== Game summaries ==
On September 12, 1992, Carleton won its season opener against Northwestern College by a 49–3 score. Ted Kluender threw two touchdown passes as Carleton secured the 400th win in program history.

On September 19, 1992, Carleton defeated the Hamline Pipers, 36–0, at Laird Stadium in Northfield, Minnesota. Tight end Scott Hanks caught seven passes for 133 yards and two touchdowns. The Carleton defense held Hamline to minus-one rushing yards on 34 attempts. Carleton linebacker Barry Burch returned an interception for a touchdown in the third quarter and Hamline's Mike Bjork recorded 17 tackles.

On September 26, 1992, Carleton defeated the Bethel Royals, 24–14. Ted Kluender threw two touchdown passes, ran for a third, and completed 16 of 30 passes for 220 yards and two touchdowns. Prior to the Bethel game, Carleton's defense had not allowed a touchdown and was ranked third in NCAA Division III.

On October 3, 1992, Carleton defeated the St. Thomas Tommies, 25–20, before a homecoming crowd of 6,000. Adam Henry rushed for 137 yards and a touchdown, and Scott Hanks caught nine passes for 150 yards. Aston Coleman also returned an interception for a touchdown. The team's 4–0 start to the season was Carleton's best start to a football season since 1957.

On October 10, 1992, Carleton defeated the Macalester Scots, 32–6. Adam Henry rushed for 115 yards and a touchdown. Ted Kluender threw two touchdown passes.

On October 17, 1992, Carleton defeated its rival St. Olaf, 21–9. Adam Henry carried 40 times for 228 rushing yards and three touchdowns, and Dave Keenan caught six passes for 151 yards for St. Olaf. Barry Burch blocked two St. Olaf kicks. With the victory, Carleton retained the Goat trophy, awarded annually to the winner of the Carleton-St. Olaf football game.

On October 24, 1992, Carleton defeated Concordia, 26–24. Carleton's Aston Coleman blocked a field goal attempt with nine seconds remaining in the game. Art Gilliland tied a Carleton single-game record with 23 tackles in the game.

On October 31, 1992, Carleton defeated Augsburg, 38–28. Adam Henry rushed for 163 yards and two touchdowns to break the Carleton single season rushing record. Scott Hanks also tied the school's single-game record with 13 catches for 136 yards and two touchdowns.

On November 7, 1992, Carleton lost to John Gagliardi's St. John's Johnnies by a stunning 70–7 score at the Metrodome. The Johnnies totaled 419 yards of total offense while Carleton was held to 201 yards. St. John's scored seven touchdowns in the first half to lead 49-0.

On Friday, November 13, 1992, Carleton secured the MIAC championship with a 21–20 victory over Gustavus Adolphus at the Metrodome. Gustavus scored a late touchdown with a chance to tie the game, but unsuccessfully tried for a two-point conversion to win the game.

On November 21, 1992, Carleton lost, 20–8, to Ron Schipper's Central College team in the first round of the Division III West Region playoffs. The game was played in Pella, Iowa. Ted Kluender completed 14 of 45 passes and was intercepted six times. Scott Hanks scored Carleton's only touchdown on a 16-yard pass from Kluender with one second remaining in the first half.

== Records and honors ==
Halfback Adam Henry set a school record with 2,035 all-purpose yards and 249 rushing attempts (1,244 yards). Henry was only the second Carleton player to rush for 1,000 yards in a season. Henry concluded his Carleton career in 1993 with a school record 3,482 rushing yards. His 1992 total of 1,244 rushing yards stood as a Carleton single-season record until 2003 when Erik Fisher rushed for 1,423 yards. His 249 rushing attempts in 1992 remains a Carleton record.

Aston Coleman also set a Carleton single-season record with 129 interception return yards.

At the end of the season, Bob Sullivan won the MIAC Coach of the Year award. Six Carleton players were named by conference coaches to the All-MIAC football team: Aston Coleman, Art Gilliland, Scott Hanks, Adam Henry, Geoff Morse, and Watie White. Hanks was also selected by the College Sports Information Directors of America as a first-team tight end on the 1992 GTE College Division Academic All-American team.

== Roster ==
1992 Carleton Knights football team roster
Players
Coaches
Offense

Pos.	#	Name	Class
WR	9	Gerard Cote	Jr
QB	12	Ted Kluender	Jr
WR	20	Aaron Cox	Jr
FB	23	Jess Kruchoski	Sr
TE	35	Scott Hanks (C)	Sr
HB	36	Adam Henry	Jr
LG	53	Eric Kalenze	Sr
C	56	Geoff Morse (C)	Sr
RG	64	Greg Smith	Jr
RT	73	Jerry Blumhoefer	So
LT	78	Sean Anderson	Jr

Defense

Pos.	#	Name	Class
CB	17	Aston Coleman	Sr
LB	25	Kris Aske	Sr
FS	26	Paul Tewes	Sr
CB	28	Dan Hanson	Jr
SS	39	Art Gilliland (C)	Sr
LB	40	Neil Volker (C)	Sr
DE	42	Watie White	Sr
NG	72	Lance Docker	Sr
DT	74	Tom Jacobs	Jr
LB	86	Barry Burch	Sr
DE	90	Eric Klein	Sr

Special teams

Pos.	#	Name	Class
PK	1	Pat Bell	Sr
P	40	Neil Volker	Sr

Head coach

- Bob Sullivan

Coordinators/assistant coaches

- Gerald Young (defensive coordinator)
- Guy Kalland (offensive line)
- Carl Happel (offensive line)
- Leon Lunder (defensive line)
- John Nielson (defensive backs)

Legend

- (C) Team captain
- (S) Suspended
- (I) Ineligible
- Injured
- Redshirt

Roster
