= Elmer Beach =

American football player and lawyer (1861–1950)

Elmer Ellsworth Beach
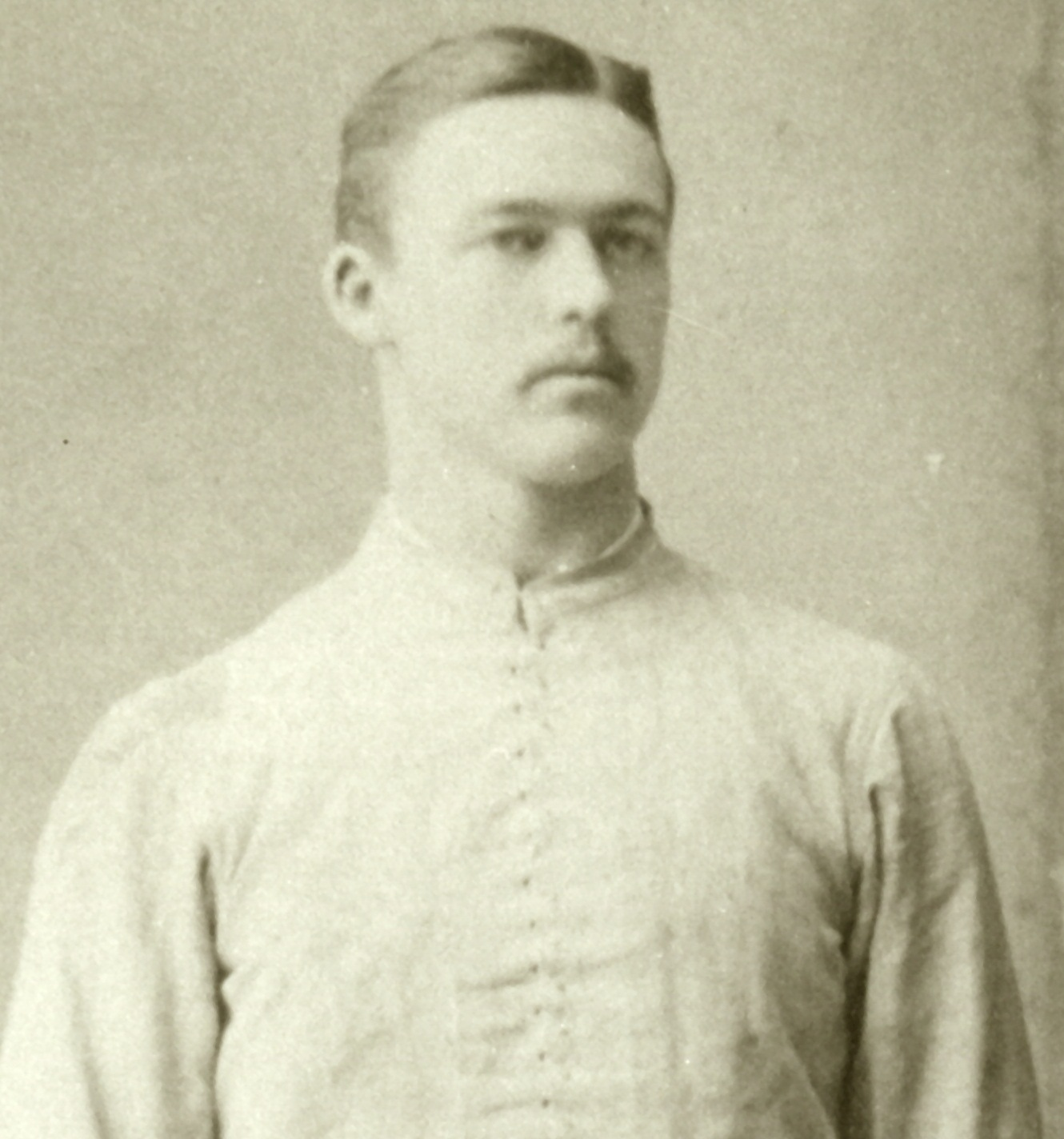
- Elmer Beach, 1883
- Born: December 19, 1861; Civil Bend, Fremont County, Iowa
- Died: March 17, 1950 (aged 88); Raleigh, North Carolina
- Citizenship: United States
- Education: University of Michigan
- Known for: Football player/Lawyer

Elmer Ellsworth Beach (December 19, 1861 – March 17, 1950) was an American football player and lawyer. He played college football for the University of Michigan from 1882 to 1883. He later became a lawyer in Chicago, established the Beach & Beach law firm, and practiced law from 1887 until his retirement in the 1930s. He was also grand master of the grand lodge of Illinois Ancient Free and Accepted Masons.

== Early years ==
Beach was born in 1861 in Civil Bend, Fremont County, Iowa, the son of Henry W. Beach and Eva E. (Canfield) Beach. At age six, he moved with his family to Atwood in northern Michigan where he was raised on a farm. He received his primary education in the public schools of Antrim, Michigan. At age 15, he left the family farm to attend school in Grand Rapids, Michigan. He attended Grand Rapids Grammar School and Grand Rapids High School, graduating 1880 in the German course and 1881 in the classical course.

== University of Michigan ==
He enrolled at the University of Michigan in 1881 and graduated in 1884 at age 22. While attending Michigan, he played college football for the 1882 and 1883 Michigan Wolverines football teams as the quarterback and a forward, respectively.

== Legal career ==
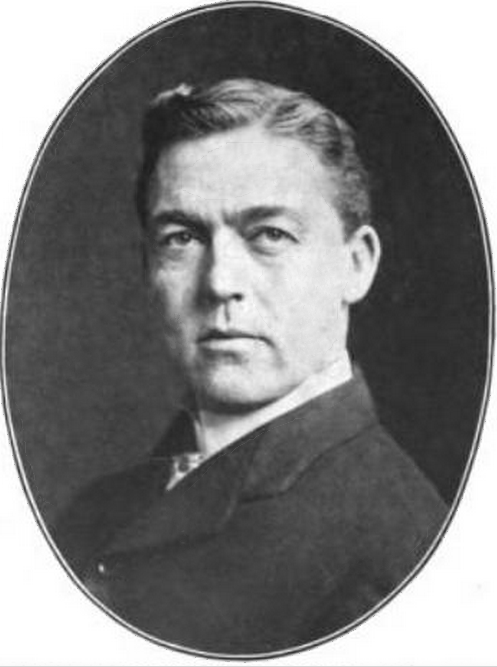
Elmer Beach, 1902

After graduating from Michigan, Beach began "reading law" with Judge Shorey of Chicago. He was admitted to the bar in 1887. They resided at 1140 Lunt Avenue in the Rogers Park section of Chicago. In 1889, Beach formed a law partnership with his brother, Raymond Walter Beach. The firm engaged in a general law practice under the name Beach & Beach with offices on the Ashland Block in Chicago. In 1908, the "Historical Encyclopedia of Illinois" wrote: "Mr. Beach's success shows what can be accomplished by energy and perseverance, rising, as he has done, from a farmer's boy to the position of one of the leading attorneys at the Chicago bar." In 1921, he was elected grand master of the grand lodge Illinois Ancient Free and Accepted Masons.

== Family ==
In July 1889, he married Jessie E. Taylor (1860–1918) of Ann Arbor, Michigan, the daughter of Jay C Taylor and Amanda McCullum. They had two children, Elizabeth Clara Beach (adopted) and Eva Mae Beach. Jessie (Taylor) Beach died July 7, 1918. April 28, 1919, he married Ethel Vianna Taylor (1891–1969) in Detroit, Michigan, the daughter of William James Taylor and Celestia L Tomlinson of Chicago. The Law firm of Beach and Beach had represented in 1913 Celestia Taylor in her divorce from William J Taylor. Six years later Elmer Beach married their daughter, 30 years his junior. He and Ethel had one daughter together, Greta Claire Beach. Elmer Beach had two brothers, Raymond Walter Beach and Rex Ellingwood Beach. His brother, Rex Beach, was a noted novelist and playwright. Elmer Beach moved to Biloxi, Mississippi and opened a law office in 1928. At that time he was reported to be the only blind attorney practicing in Mississippi. Beach became totally blind in 1926 following an operation on his eyes for which he charged the surgeon with negligence. The suit was ultimately dismissed. He moved to Raleigh, North Carolina in approximately 1940. In March 1950, he died at his home in Raleigh at the age of 88 after a long illness.

== See also ==
- 1882 Michigan Wolverines football team
- 1883 Michigan Wolverines football team
