= John F. Condon =

American football coach

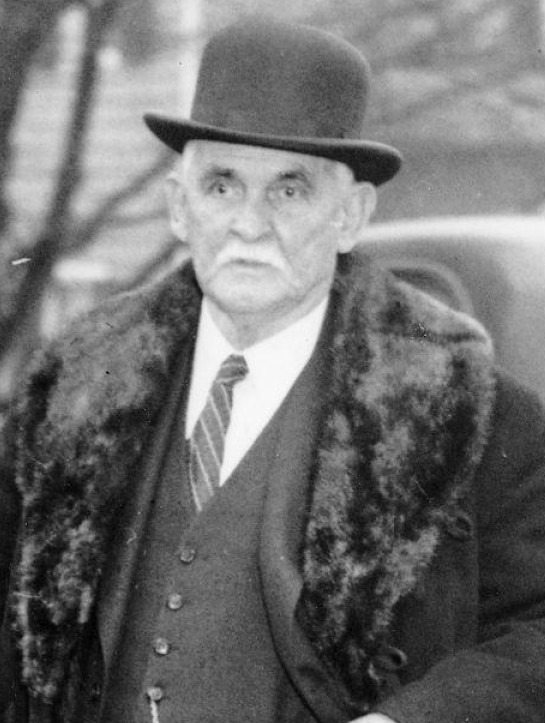
- Condon in 1935

Biographical details
- Born: June 1, 1860; Bronx, New York, U.S.
- Died: January 2, 1945 (aged 84); Bronx, New York, U.S.

Coaching career (HC unless noted)
- 1883: Fordham

Head coaching record
- Overall: 3–5

John F. "Jafsie" Condon (June 1, 1860 – January 2, 1945) was an American college football coach and school principal. He was the first head football coach at Fordham University, serving for one season, in 1883, and compiling a record of 3–5. He became the principal at a New York City public school and gained fame in 1932 as the person who delivered the ransom in the Lindbergh kidnapping.

Condon died of pneumonia, on January 2, 1945, at his home in The Bronx.

== Head coaching record ==
Year	Team	Overall	Conference	Standing	Bowl/playoffs
Fordham (Independent) (1883)
1883	Fordham	3–5			
Fordham:		3–5			
Total:		3–5			
