= Tom Journell =

American football coach (born 1965)

Current position
- Title: Head coach
- Team: Carleton
- Conference: MIAC
- Record: 43–34

Biographical details
- Born: May 20, 1965 (age 61); Newark, Ohio, U.S.
- Education: Wittenberg University (1987); Miami University (1989)

Playing career

Football
- 1983–1986: Wittenberg

Baseball
- 1983–1986: Wittenberg

Coaching career (HC unless noted)

Football
- 1987–1988: Miami (OH) (GA)
- 1989: Wisconsin–River Falls (DB)
- 1990–1994: Wisconsin–River Falls (DC)
- 1995–2003: Wisconsin–River Falls (AHC/DC)
- 2004–2007: Elmhurst
- 2008–2011: Wisconsin–Stevens Point (DC)
- 2012–2017: Wisconsin–Stevens Point
- 2018–present: Carleton

Head coaching record
- Overall: 94–83

Thomas W. Journell (born May 20, 1965) is an American college football coach. He is the head football coach for Carleton College, a position he has held since 2018. He was the head football coach for Elmhurst University from 2004 to 2007 and the University of Wisconsin–Stevens Point from 2012 to 2017. He also coached for Miami (OH) and Wisconsin–River Falls. He played college football and college baseball for Wittenberg.

== Head coaching record ==
Year	Team	Overall	Conference	Standing	Bowl/playoffs
Elmhurst Bluejays (College Conference of Illinois and Wisconsin) (2004–2007)
2004	Elmhurst	4–6	1–6	7th	
2005	Elmhurst	6–4	3–4	5th	
2006	Elmhurst	6–4	3–4	T–4th	
2007	Elmhurst	6–4	3–4	T–5th	
Elmhurst:		22–18	10–18		
Wisconsin–Stevens Point Pointers (Wisconsin Intercollegiate Athletic Conference) (2012–2017)
2012	Wisconsin–Stevens Point	2–8	1–6	T–7th	
2013	Wisconsin–Stevens Point	5–5	3–4	T–4th	
2014	Wisconsin–Stevens Point	7–3	4–3	4th	
2015	Wisconsin–Stevens Point	5–5	3–4	T–4th	
2016	Wisconsin–Stevens Point	6–4	3–4	T–4th	
2017	Wisconsin–Stevens Point	4–6	1–6	7th	
Wisconsin–Stevens Point:		29–31	15–27		
Carleton Knights (Minnesota Intercollegiate Athletic Conference) (2018–present)
2018	Carleton	3–7	2–6	7th	
2019	Carleton	4–6	2–6	7th	
2020–21	No team—COVID-19				
2021	Carleton	7–3	5–3	3rd (Northwoods)	
2022	Carleton	7–3	5–3	3rd (Northwoods)	
2023	Carleton	7–3	5–3	3rd (Northwoods)	
2024	Carleton	5–5	4–4	T–2nd (Northwoods)	
2025	Carleton	6–4	6–3	T–3rd	
2026	Carleton	4–3	4–2		
Carleton:		43–34	33–30		
Total:		94–83			
