= Thomas Peebles (American football) =

College football coach (1857–1938)

Biographical details
- Born: March 18, 1857; Letterkenny, Ireland
- Died: March 10, 1938 (aged 80); Minneapolis, Minnesota, U.S.

Coaching career (HC unless noted)
- 1883: Minnesota

Head coaching record
- Overall: 1–2

Thomas Peebles (March 18, 1857 – March 10, 1938) was the father of American cheerleading and the first college football coach at the University of Minnesota, in 1883. Peebles coached the team in three games in that early season. They lost two and won one.

Peebles was born in Ireland and emigrated to the United States when he was 13. He graduated from Princeton University in 1882 and moved to Minneapolis the following year. There he taught philosophy at the University of Minnesota for five years. He was later president of a construction firm.

== Career ==
Peebles was a professor of philosophy at the University of Minnesota, and coaching was something he did without pay. After several students found out he knew football from his time at Princeton, they coaxed him to give them pointers. After the initial practice in preparation for a game against Carleton College, Peebles "devoted many of his evenings to instructing the students in the rudiments of the game."

For practices, Peebles would often split the team in two for scrimmages. He coached one side while an appointed player coached the other. When Peebles' side scored (which was more often), he would cheer "Sis-Boom-Ah, Princeton!" Two players desired a cheer to respond to the East coaster and developed "Rah Rah Rah, Ski OO Mah!" The school paper printed the cheer in 1885, and it cemented the tradition for the Gophers team.

Peebles continued to assist in the expansion of the game within the university until 1888. He would later help other local teams learn the game, and then compete against the Frederick S. Jones-coached Gophers. Since Jones was from Yale, the games were "lively," as they were "a case of rivalry between Princeton and Yale."

While there, he transitioned to law as a career, passed the bar and began practicing in Minnesota. He used his knowledge and skills to manage companies in other states, including a phone company (The Mississippi Valley Telephone Company), and two agriculture firms: the Goose Lake Valley Irrigation Company in southern Oregon, and the New Mexico-based Arlington Land Company.

In his later years, he founded a building company. The Thomas Peebles and Sons building company put up many homes in Minneapolis as the city expanded. Many of the houses still stand today. Later in life, Peebles lived in a house north of Cedar Lake in Minneapolis. Now the street behind his old house is named "Thomas Avenue" and the area is the "Peebles Addition to Minneapolis."

== Death ==
Peebles died on March 10, 1938, at his home in Minneapolis.

== Head coaching record ==
Year	Team	Overall	Conference	Standing	Bowl/playoffs
Minnesota Golden Gophers (Independent) (1883)
1883	Minnesota	1–2			
Minnesota:		1–2			
Total:		1–2			
