= Alex Moffat (American football) =

American football player, coach, and official (1862–1914)

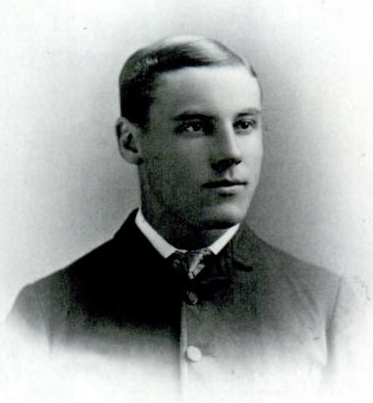

Princeton Tigers
- Position: Halfback

Personal information
- Born: September 22, 1862; Princeton, New Jersey, U.S.
- Died: February 23, 1914 (aged 51); New York, New York, U.S.

Career information
- College: Princeton (1882–1884)
- College Football Hall of Fame (Class of 1971)

Alexander Moffat (September 22, 1862 – February 23, 1914) was an American football player, coach and official. He played college football at Princeton University from 1882 to 1884 and was known as one of the greatest kickers in 19th century football. After his playing career ended, he remained active in the development of the game as a coach and founding member of football's rules committee. He was reported to have held a place in Princeton athletic history similar to that held by Walter Camp at Yale. Moffat was elected to the College Football Hall of Fame in 1971.

== Early life ==
Moffat was born in Princeton, New Jersey, in 1862. He was the son of James C. Moffat, who was a professor at Princeton University for 40 years.

== Football player ==
Moffat enrolled at Princeton and was a member of the Princeton Tigers football and baseball teams in the early 1880s. In baseball, he was Princeton's star pitcher for four years.

In football, he played at the halfback position and developed a reputation as "probably the greatest kicker ever seen on a football field." Football historian David M. Nelson credits Moffat with revolutionizing the kicking game in 1883 by developing the "spiral punt," described by Nelson as "a dramatic change from the traditional end-over-end kicks." Moffat has also been credited with inventing the drop kick, and kicked equally well with either foot.

Moffat was a member of the Princeton football team from 1882 to 1884. As the team's senior captain in 1883, Moffat kicked 32 field goals in 15 games. In Princeton's 26 to 7 victory over Harvard in 1883, Moffat made five field goals, two drop kicks with his right foot, two drop kicks with his left foot, and one from placement.

== Football official and coach ==
By profession, Moffat was a civil engineer. However, he remained an active and influential coach and official in the sport of football. Moffat was a member of football's Rules Committee for most of his adult life and, in that capacity, helped shape the game during its formative years. In October 1883, while still a student at Princeton, he was one of two Princeton representatives on an informal, seven-member rules committee that adopted the game's first modern scoring system—2 points for a touchdown, 4 points for a goal after touchdown, and 5 points for a field goal.

In December 1893, with the game in turmoil as the result of deaths and serious injuries resulting from the game, a formalized Rules Committee was established consisting of Walter Camp of Yale, W. A. Brooks of Harvard, and Moffat as Princeton's representative. The New York Times urged the three men to "abolish mass plays and other brutal manoeuvres." Moffat remained on the Rules Committee until his death in 1914.

For many years, Moffat also served as an "advisory coach" to the Princeton football team. Contemporaneous records show that Moffat was active in coaching the team. For example, the undefeated 1896 team is listed as having "no coach", but a report published that fall in The Harvard Crimson noted that "Alexander Moffat '84 has charge of the team and is being assisted by Lea '96 and Morse '95." According to an obituary, Moffat for many years after his graduation "acted as coach, umpire and referee and made practice of going to Princeton nearly every season to aid in the training of the football team." Big Bill Edwards, who played at Princeton from 1896 to 1899, later wrote of Moffat: "His interest in the game was great, and he was always ready to give as much time as was needed to the coaching of the Princeton teams. His hard, efficient work developed remarkable kickers. He loved the game and was a cheerful, encouraging and sympathetic coach."

Moffat died from pneumonia at Presbyterian Hospital in New York City in 1914 at age 51.

In 1971, Moffat was posthumously inducted into the College Football Hall of Fame.
