= Georgetown football, 1874–1889 =

1874–1889 history of the Georgetown Hoyas football program

The Georgetown Hoyas football program represents Georgetown University, based in Washington, D.C., in the sport of American football. This article covers the team's history through 1889, when it was known simply as Georgetown football. The team was founded in 1874, but did not play any games that year. They scheduled their first game in 1881 against a local high school, but the latter failed to show up for the game and it was considered a Georgetown forfeit win. In 1883, they played two games against Gallaudet University. They reportedly played a game in 1884, played no games from 1885 to 1886, and then played regularly in the final three years of the decade, including their first intercollegiate match in 1889 against the Virginia Cavaliers. Modern-day Georgetown records do not consider any games prior to 1887 official, although their media guides prior to 1950 did.

== Formation ==
Georgetown University's football team traces its history to 1874. The sport had first been played five years earlier, and it was growing in popularity. Baseball was the first sport to begin at the school in 1870, and students wanted to have a sport to play in the winter as well. On November 1, 1874, school students met and created the Georgetown College Football Association, with the intention to start up an intercollegiate team and play later that year.

A committee was created that consisted of 15, including an elected president, vice president, secretary-treasurer and two censors; the Georgetown website notes that "exactly what a football censor did ... the College Journal does not explain." The team's founding was reported in the College Journal, which described the association: "A committee of three was appointed to draw up a code of laws, and another committee of ten was appointed to serve as referees, A small monthly collection from the students who wish to take part in the game will suffice for all expenses. The game is played only during the winter months." However, the team did not last as there were no nearby teams to compete against, and thus it folded shortly after being founded.

The Georgetown Athletic Association was formed by students in 1875, but the founding documents included nothing relating to football.

== 1881 ==
1881 Georgetown football
- Conference: Independent
- Record: 1–0
- Head coach: None

The 1881 Georgetown football team represented Georgetown University during the 1881 college football season. The team had scheduled its first game against an outside opponent upon receiving a challenge from Alexandria High School in Virginia, but the latter did not appear and Georgetown considered it a forfeit win.

The Georgetown College Journal including a report about the game:

Before the holidays the football eleven of the Alexandria High School sent a challenge to the college for a match game; the game was to be played on their grounds and the Rugby ball was to be used. Though we had not a regularly organized team, the challenge was accepted, and an eleven was selected from the players of the year. All arrangements for the match were made, but at the last moment word was sent to us that the High School eleven could not play; the game was consequently postponed.
Though this match did not take place, there is no reason why football should not become as popular at the college during the colder months of the year as baseball is in the summer. We have a first class baseball nine; now let us have a good football eleven.

This was Georgetown's only ever win against Alexandria High School, as they later lost games to them in 1887 and 1888. Georgetown does not consider games prior to 1887 as official; however, prior to 1950 their media guides listed the pre-1887 results.

No extramural games were played until 1883.

=== Schedule ===
Date	Opponent	Site	Result
November 23	at Alexandria High School	Alexandria, VA	W 2–0

== 1883 ==
1883 Georgetown football
- Conference: Independent
- Record: 0–2
- Head coach: None
- Captain: J. R. Slattery

The 1883 Georgetown football team represented Georgetown University during the 1883 college football season. Two games were played against Gallaudet University, in the first games played against outside competitors, though not officially considered so by Georgetown records. Georgetown lost both.

=== Schedule ===
Date	Opponent	Site	Result
November 27	at Gallaudet	Kendall Green; Washington, DC	L 0–13
November 29	at Gallaudet	Kendall Green; Washington, DC	L 0–15

== 1884 ==
1884 Georgetown football
- Conference: Independent
- Record: ?–?
- Head coach: None

The 1884 Georgetown football team represented Georgetown University during the 1884 college football season. There was a mention in The Critic and Record that Georgetown traveled to play St. John's College; however, the result is unknown and the game has not been verified.

No games were recorded from 1885 to 1886.

=== Schedule ===
Date	Opponent	Site	Result
Unknown	at St. John's College	Annapolis, MD	Unknown

== 1887 ==
1887 Georgetown football
- Conference: Independent
- Record: 2–1
- Head coach: Dick Hennessy (1st season)
- Captain: Dick Hennessy
- Home stadium: Georgetown Field

The 1887 Georgetown football team represented Georgetown University during the 1887 college football season. This is the first season officially recognized in modern school record books (after 1950). The season featured three games, with wins over Emerson Institute (46–6) and Washington High School (12–6) while losing 24–8 to Alexandria High School; these were the first games to take place at Georgetown, as previous games were played at their opponents' fields.

=== Schedule ===
Date	Opponent	Site	Result
October 22	Emerson Institute	Georgetown Field; Washington, DC	W 46–6
October 28	Alexandria High School	Georgetown Field; Washington, DC	L 8–24
November 6	Washington High School	Georgetown Field; Washington, DC	W 12–6

== 1888 ==
1888 Georgetown football
- Conference: Independent
- Record: 4–2
- Head coach: Dan O'Day (1st season)
- Captain: Dan O'Day
- Home stadium: Georgetown Field

The 1888 Georgetown football team represented Georgetown University during the 1888 college football season. The played six games and finished with a 4–2 record, including a forfeit by the Jefferson Athletic Club. This was the first season to include games against a semi-pro team, as previously Georgetown had only played against local high schools.

=== Schedule ===
Date	Opponent	Site	Result	Attendance
October 15	Orient Athletic Club	Georgetown Field; Washington, DC	W 8–0	300
October 16	Jefferson Athletic Club	Georgetown Field; Washington, DC	W 1–0	
October 16	Washington Athletic Club	Georgetown Field; Washington, DC	W 8–0	
November 13	Orient Athletic Club	Georgetown Field; Washington, DC	W 9–6	
November 17	Dupont Athletic Club	Georgetown Field; Washington, DC	L 0–16	
November 20	at Alexandria High School	Alexandria High School; Alexandria, VA	L 5–12	

== 1889 ==
1889 Georgetown football
- Conference: Independent
- Record: 5–1
- Head coach: Bill Gleason (1st season)
- Captain: Bill Gleason
- Home stadium: Old Georgetown Field

The 1889 Georgetown football team represented Georgetown University during the 1889 college football season. They finished the season with a record of 5–1. This season included the first match against a full collegiate team, the Virginia Cavaliers. Georgetown's records show this game as a 34–0 victory for the team, while Virginia's record a 32–0 victory for the Cavaliers.

=== Schedule ===
Date	Time	Opponent	Site	Result	Attendance	Source
October 29		Orient Athletic Club	Old Georgetown Field; Washington, DC	W 6–0		
November 1		at Virginia	Madison Hall Field; Charlottesville, VA	W 34–0		
November 8		at Gallaudet	Kendall Park; Washington, DC	L 0–8		
November 28	3:30 p.m.	Dupont Athletic Club	Swampoodle Grounds; Washington, DC	W 2–0	1,500	
December 3		at Episcopal High School	Alexandria, VA	W 8–6		
January 18, 1890		Gallaudet	Old Georgetown Field; Washington, DC	W 10–4		
All times are in Eastern time
