= Carleton Knights football =

Football team representing Carleton College

- First season: 1883; 143 years ago
- Athletic director: Heidi Jaynes
- Head coach: Tom Journell; 8th season, 33–27 (.550)
- Location: Northfield, Minnesota
- Stadium: Laird Stadium (capacity: 7,500)
- NCAA division: Division III
- Conference: MIAC (1983–present)
- Colors: Blue and maize
- All-time record: 481–491–25 (.495)

Conference championships
- 11 (9 Midwest, 2 MIAC)
- Website: athletics.carleton.edu/football

The Carleton Knights football team represents Carleton College in college football at the NCAA Division III level. The program was started in 1883 and was very successful through the early 1960s, winning over 20 conference championships from 1895 to 1956.

Carleton has played in the Minnesota Intercollegiate Athletic Conference since 1983. The Knights won the conference title in 1992 with a 9–1 record overall, earning entry into the NCAA Division III Football Championship. Carleton lost in the first round.

== History ==
=== 1883–1904 ===
Carleton played its first game against the University of Minnesota in 1883, making it the tenth-oldest football program in Division III. Carleton insisted that a member of the faculty be allowed to play and that the game would be rugby style football. Minnesota's coach Thomas Peebles preferred the soccer style of play, but agreed to the conditions as long as he could act as the referee. Carleton won the game 4–2.

The college officially sanctioned the team in 1891 and hired a paid coach in 1898.

Minnesota and Carleton played every year from 1896 to 1904 under the intercollegiate football rules of the time. Minnesota won all nine games, by a total score of 337–17.

=== 1905–1919 ===
From 1905 to 1917, Carleton won 10 championships in 13 years with a record of 66–17–2.

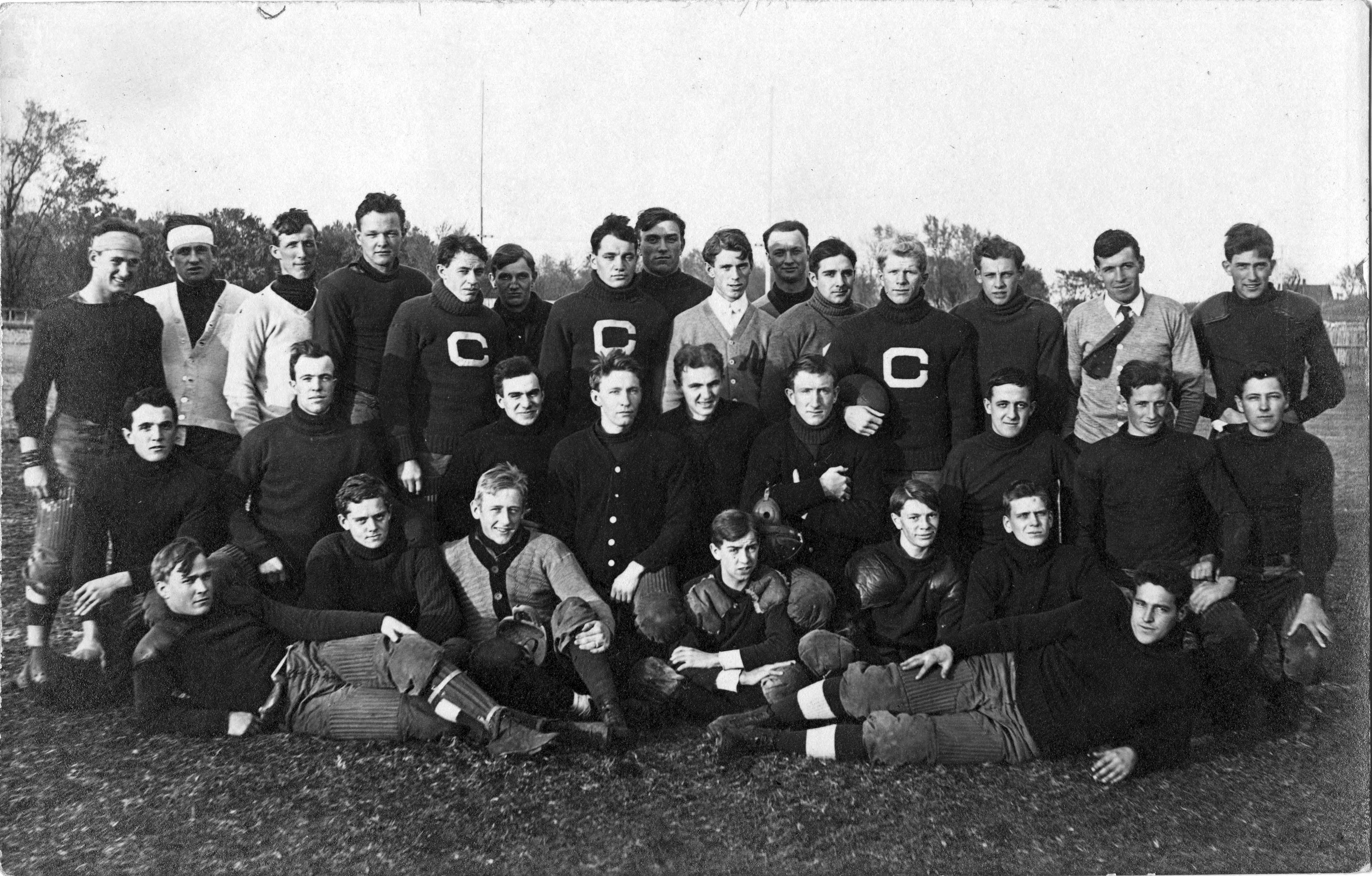
1909 Carleton football team

Claude J. Hunt became the head coach in 1913 and compiled an incredible record through 1916. Hunt's teams were undefeated over those four years, allowing only three touchdowns and outscoring opponents 1,196 to 20. In the 1915 season, Carleton outscored Stout, Cornell, Grinnell, Macalester, Beloit, and Hamline by a combined score of 323–0.

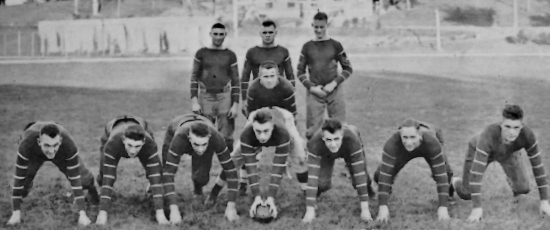
Carleton College Foot-Ball Team 1916.Backfield – Keller, Phillips, Johnson, Dunphy. Line – Allison, Truesdale, Massopust, Welshons, Yerxa, Rolfe, Farell

In the first game of the 1916 season, Carleton traveled to Chicago and beat the Chicago Maroons 7–0, in a shocking upset. In the second quarter, Chicago was forced to punt on their 21-yard line. Due to Carleton pressure and a strong wind, the punt travelled three yards backwards. Five plays later, Keller ran for a touchdown, scoring the only points of the game. In the final 30 seconds of the game, Chicago had a first down on the Carls' one yard line. (Note: Before 1950, Carleton athletic teams did not have an official moniker and were most often called Carls, a term then and now used to denote all students at the school.)

On the next play, Carleton caused a fumble and preserved the victory. Chicago was coached by Amos Alonzo Stagg and was a member of the Western Conference at the time. Stagg said Carleton's 1916 team "will always be remembered as the first to demonstrate to the football world that Carleton produces teams of the first class, worthy to be placed on par with any team in the country."

When Hunt left for the University of Washington in 1917, Carleton hired Cub Buck as his replacement and as athletic director. Buck was the captain and a consensus All-American on the 1915 Wisconsin Badgers football team. By the fall of 1917, the Great War had reduced the number of athletes on campus and Carleton slipped from its previous success. The 1917 team was 4–1, losing to Cornell but shutting out Macalester, Hamline, and St. Thomas for the state title. 1918 was a unique season due to the flu pandemic and Student Army Training Corps program. A joint Carleton-St. Olaf team played the University of Minnesota; due to a lack of cohesion of the Northfielders, they lost 59–6. Carleton and St. Olaf then split up and played each other three times, St. Olaf winning the first and the Carls prevailing in the next two. Football began to return to normal in 1919, Carleton went 4–4. During his three-year tenure at Carleton, Buck played pro football with Jim Thorpe and the Canton Bulldogs on Sundays after coaching on Saturdays. Buck's overall Carleton record was 10–7.

=== 1920–1978 ===
Hunt returned to coach Carleton from 1920 to 1930, during which the team won four conference titles. His overall Carleton record was 76–22–4.

Carleton was a founding member of the Minnesota Intercollegiate Athletic Conference (MIAC) in 1920. It was also a founding member of the Midwest Collegiate Athletic Conference (Midwest) in 1921. Carleton football participated in both conferences in 1922, 1923, and 1924; winning the Midwest title in 1923 and the MIAC title in 1924. After the 1924 season, Carleton left the MIAC, playing in the Midwest through 1982.

Carleton won six Midwest championships from 1925 to 1940.

Carleton vs. major college teams
Year	Rival	Score
1916	Chicago	7–0
1922	Wisconsin	0–41
1925	Northwestern	0–17
1926	Northwestern	3–31
1928	Army	7–32
1930	Wisconsin	0–28
1932	Army	0–57
1936	Iowa	0–14

From 1922 to 1936, Carleton played seven games versus major college teams, losing all seven. After a 57–0 loss at Army in 1932, Herbert Hoover invited the Carls to tour the White House.

In 1954, the Walter Hass-coached Knights went 8–0 and won the Midwest conference championship. The closest game of the season was against defending conference champs and cross-town rivals St. Olaf. Carleton, down 13–7 in the last minutes of the game, drove to the 2-yard line but fumbled the ball away. On the next play, the Oles ran the ball and the swarming Carleton defense caused a fumble in the end zone which they recovered for a touchdown. With the extra point kick, the final was Carleton 14, St. Olaf 13.

After one more year, Hass left for the University of Chicago, where he restarted the Maroons' football program. Warren Beson coached the team from 1956 to 1959. The Knights were Midwest tri-champions in Beson's first year, and the team put together four impressive seasons, going 21–7–2, and outscoring opponents by 632–397. Tragically, Beson died of a heart attack at age 35 in the middle of the 1959 season.

The program began to fade in the early 1960s. The Knights experienced a long stretch of losing seasons from 1964 to 1978, during which Carleton's record was 33–89–2.

Carleton hosted the only NCAA-sponsored metric football game in 1977. The game was dubbed the "Liter Bowl" as all measurements were in meters instead of yards. The field was 100 meters long between the goal lines and 50 meters wide (109.36 and 54.68 yards, respectively) and the football was 29 centimeters long. The Knights lost to their rival St. Olaf, 43–0. Drawing around 10,000 fans, the event was the last to fill Laird Stadium.

=== 1979–present ===
In 1979, Carleton hired Bob Sullivan as head football coach. Sullivan turned the program around in the first year, winning a Midwest conference divisional title, but falling to Lawrence in the Conference Championship. After several more winning seasons, Carleton left the Midwest and rejoined the Minnesota Intercollegiate Athletic Conference in 1983. The first few seasons in the MIAC were difficult, but Carleton consistently posted winning seasons from 1986 to 1993.

The Knights went 8–1 in the MIAC and were crowned conference champions in the 1992 season. It was Carleton's first conference championship since 1956 in the Midwest Conference. The team was 9–1 overall and was selected to play in the Division III playoffs that year, but lost 20–8 at Central College (Iowa) in the first round.

Sullivan retired in 2000, finishing with 102 wins, the most in the program's history.

== Players ==
Carleton has had eight first team All-Americans including: Jim Bradford, selected as a College Division II first team All-American wide receiver in 1990; and Drew Ziller, a safety selected in 2008 by the American Football Coaches Association to its Division III All-America first team and by the Associated Press to its Little All-America third team. Additionally, Carleton has had fifteen honorable mention All-Americans including: Scott O'Reilly, selected as both a Hewlett Packard and d3football.com Honorable Mention All-American middle linebacker in 2001; and Erik Fisher, a running back selected in 2003 as Honorable Mention All-American by d3football.com.

== Laird Stadium ==
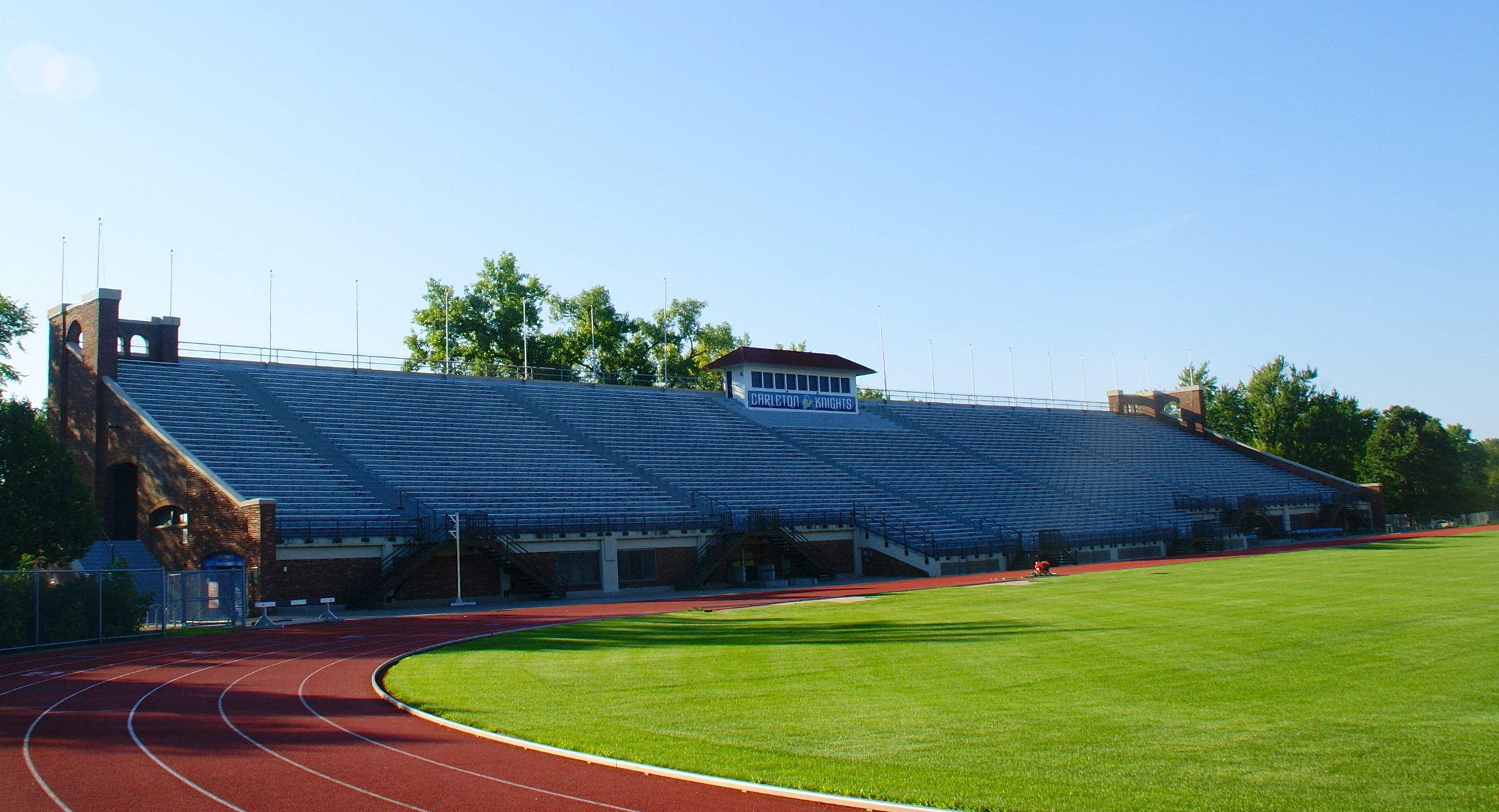
Laird Stadium from southwest endzone

Laird Athletic Field opened with a covered grandstand in 1902.

Laird Stadium was built in 1927 with 7,500 seats in one grandstand, as the college was considering joining the Big Ten. It is the third-largest Division III stadium west of the Mississippi River.

During the 2010 football season, the Cannon River, which flows directly behind Laird Stadium, flooded to record levels. The football field was under several feet of water for many days, forcing the relocation of three home games. The lower level of the stadium grandstand, where all football facilities are located, was destroyed. The stadium interior was remodeled in 2012.

During the 2022 football season, Carleton College dedicated the football field at Laird Stadium as Bob Sullivan Field to honor long time head football coach Bob Sullivan, the winningest coach in Carleton College Football history.

== Rivalries ==
=== St. Olaf Oles ===
The Knights' biggest rival is the Oles of St. Olaf College, located on the other side of Northfield, Minnesota. The first meeting of Carleton and St. Olaf football players was actually on the same team. Due to the Great War and the flu pandemic, the rivals combined forces to play the University of Minnesota at the beginning of the 1918 season. However, the players and supporters did not get along, and the Northfielders suffered a 59–6 defeat. After that experience, the schools decided to part ways. A typical season was not an option, so Carleton and St. Olaf played each other three times. St. Olaf won the first match-up 14–13 through "over-confidence" on the part of the Carls. Carleton won the next game 7–0, but St. Olaf protested the officiating, so a rubber match was held which Carleton won 35–0.

The rivalry has continued every year since except during World War II and after the Halloween blizzard in 1991, when St. Olaf refused to reschedule the game. Each year the winner receives the Goat Trophy, which was first awarded in 1931. Sports Illustrated wrote about St. Olaf vs. Carleton's undefeated 1954 team and covered the 1962 St. Olaf at Carleton game. St. Olaf leads the series 55–44–1.

=== Macalester Scots ===
In 1998, The Book of Knowledge trophy was created for Carleton's annual game against the Macalester Scots. The trophy name is based on both schools being top national liberal arts colleges, Carleton #6 and Macalester #26 in the 2017 U.S. News & World Report rankings. Due to repeated losing seasons in the MIAC, Macalester left the conference in football after the 2001 season, although the teams have continued to play a non-conference game every year since. Carleton leads the trophy game series 15–8 and the overall series 53–13–1.

== See also ==
- 1992 Carleton Knights football team
- Carleton Knights
