= Hamline Pipers football =

- First season: 1882
- Athletic director: Alex Focke
- Head coach: Bob Davies; 1st season, 0–0 (–)
- Location: Saint Paul, Minnesota
- Stadium: Klas Field (capacity: 2,000)
- NCAA division: Division III
- Conference: MIAC
- Colors: Burgundy and gray
- All-time record: 426–518–30 (.453)

Conference championships
- 5
- Mascot: The Piper
- Website: hamlineathletics.com/football

The Hamline Pipers football team represents Hamline University in the sport of American football. The team played the first intercollegiate football game in Minnesota on September 30, 1882. The team lost to Minnesota, 4-0.

A founding member, Hamline has been a member of the Minnesota Intercollegiate Athletic Conference since 1920.
