= 2024 NCAA Division III football season =

American college football season

- Total No. of teams: 240
- Preseason AP No. 1: North Central (IL)
- Regular season: September 1 – November 16, 2024
- Playoffs: November 23 – January 5, 2025
- National championship: Shell Energy Stadium; Houston, TX; January 5, 2025
- Champion: North Central (IL)
- Gagliardi Trophy: Luke Lehnen, QB, North Central (IL)

The 2024 NCAA Division III football season was the component of the 2024 college football season organized by the NCAA at the Division III level in the United States. The regular season began on September 1 and ended on November 16. This was the 51st season that the NCAA has sponsored a Division III championship.

Cortland is the defending national champion.

The playoffs were expanded from 32 from last season to 40 teams.

The season's playoffs was played between November 23 and January 5, 2025, culminating in the national championship—also known as the Stagg Bowl. The game was initially set for Turner Stadium in Humble, Texas, but was later moved to Shell Energy Stadium in Houston. The move also makes the 2024 championship game the first since 2004 to be played on a grass field. North Central (IL) was the 2025 Stagg Bowl champions, defeated Mount Union 41–25.

== Conference changes and new programs ==
=== Membership changes ===
Team	Former conference	New conference	Ref
Hilbert Hawks	Independent	Empire 8	
Castleton Spartans	ECFC	MASCAC	
Calvin Knights	New program	MIAA	
Austin Kangaroos	ASC	SCAC	
Centenary Gentlemen	Restarted program	SCAC	
Lyon Scots	Independent	SCAC	
McMurry War Hawks	ASC	SCAC	
Texas Lutheran Bulldogs	ASC	SCAC	
Sul Ross Lobos	ASC	LSC (NCAA D-II)	
Defiance Yellow Jackets	HCAC	MSFA (NAIA)	
Birmingham–Southern Panthers	SAA	School closed	
Maine Maritime Mariners	Restarted program	Independent	

== Other headlines ==
- April 18 – The NCAA D-III Management Council announced that they would support an expansion of the playoff bracket from 32 teams to 40 effective for this season. The amount of automatic qualifier bids will remain unchanged, but the amount of available at-large bids will increase from 4 to 12.
- August 1 – The Commonwealth Coast Conference announced that it would be rebranding to the Conference of New England, effective for the 2024 season.

== Conference standings ==
2024 American Rivers Conference football standings
	Conf.			Overall
Team	W		L	W		L
No. 13 Wartburg $^	8	–	0	10	–	2
Coe ^	7	–	1	9	–	2
Central (IA)	6	–	2	8	–	2
Dubuque	5	–	3	5	–	5
Simpson (IA)	4	–	4	5	–	5
Nebraska Wesleyan	2	–	6	3	–	7
Buena Vista	2	–	6	2	–	8
Loras	2	–	6	2	–	8
Luther	0	–	8	1	–	9
$ – Conference champion; ^ – NCAA Division III playoff participant; Rankings from D3football.com

2024 American Southwest Conference football standings
	Conf.			Overall
Team	W		L	W		L
No. 4 Hardin–Simmons $^	6	–	0	10	–	1
Mary Hardin–Baylor ^	4	–	2	8	–	4
East Texas Baptist	2	–	4	5	–	4
Howard Payne	0	–	6	1	–	8
$ – Conference champion; ^ – NCAA Division III playoff participant; Rankings from D3football.com

2024 Centennial Conference football standings
	Conf.			Overall
Team	W		L	W		L
No. 19 Johns Hopkins $^	6	–	0	12	–	2
Ursinus ^	5	–	1	9	–	2
Muhlenberg	4	–	2	8	–	3
Franklin & Marshall	3	–	3	7	–	4
Dickinson	2	–	4	5	–	6
Gettysburg	1	–	5	2	–	8
McDaniel	0	–	6	1	–	9
$ – Conference champion; ^ – NCAA Division III playoff participant; Rankings from D3football.com

2024 College Conference of Illinois and Wisconsin football standings
	Conf.			Overall
Team	W		L	W		L
No. 1 North Central (IL) $^	9	–	0	15	–	0
No. 20 Wheaton (IL)	8	–	1	9	–	2
Washington University	7	–	2	8	–	2
Illinois Wesleyan	5	–	4	5	–	5
Carroll (WI)	4	–	5	5	–	5
North Park	4	–	5	5	–	5
Augustana (IL)	3	–	6	4	–	6
Elmhurst	3	–	6	3	–	7
Carthage	2	–	7	2	–	8
Millikin	0	–	9	0	–	10
$ – Conference champion; ^ – NCAA Division III playoff participant; Rankings from D3Football.com

2024 Conference of New England football standings
	Conf.			Overall
Team	W		L	W		L
No. 10 Endicott $^	5	–	0	10	–	2
Western New England	3	–	2	6	–	4
Husson	3	–	2	6	–	5
Curry	2	–	3	4	–	6
New England (ME)	2	–	3	4	–	6
Nichols	0	–	5	3	–	7
$ – Conference champion; ^ – NCAA Division III playoff participant; Rankings from D3Football.com

2024 Eastern Collegiate Football Conference standings
	Conf.			Overall
Team	W		L	W		L
Alfred State y$^	2	–	1	5	–	6
Anna Maria y	2	–	1	4	–	5
Gallaudet	2	–	1	5	–	4
Dean	0	–	3	0	–	9
Championship: Alfred State 39, Anna Maria 37
$ – Conference champion; y – Championship game participant; ^ – NCAA Division III playoff participant

2024 Empire 8 Athletic Conference football standings
	Conf.			Overall
Team	W		L	W		L
No. 2 Cortland $^	7	–	0	11	–	1
Brockport	5	–	2	8	–	3
Morrisville	5	–	2	7	–	4
Alfred	5	–	2	7	–	4
Utica	3	–	4	5	–	5
St. John Fisher	2	–	5	3	–	7
Hartwick	1	–	6	2	–	8
Hilbert	0	–	7	0	–	10
$ – Conference champion; ^ – NCAA Division III playoff participant; Rankings from D3Football.com

2024 Heartland Collegiate Athletic Conference football standings
	Conf.			Overall
Team	W		L	W		L
Mount St. Joseph $^	6	–	0	8	–	3
Hanover	5	–	1	8	–	3
Rose–Hulman	4	–	2	5	–	5
Bluffton	3	–	3	3	–	7
Franklin (IN)	2	–	4	3	–	7
Anderson (IN)	1	–	5	2	–	8
Manchester	0	–	6	0	–	10
$ – Conference champion; ^ – NCAA Division III playoff participant

2024 Landmark Conference football standings
	Conf.			Overall
Team	W		L	W		L
No. 6 Susquehanna $^	6	–	0	12	–	2
Wilkes	5	–	1	7	–	4
Moravian	4	–	2	7	–	4
Catholic University	3	–	3	5	–	5
Lycoming	2	–	4	4	–	6
Juniata	1	–	5	2	–	8
Keystone	0	–	6	1	–	9
$ – Conference champion; ^ – NCAA Division III playoff participant; Rankings from D3Football.com

2024 Liberty League football standings
	Conf.			Overall
Team	W		L	W		L
Hobart $^	6	–	0	9	–	2
Ithaca	5	–	1	6	–	4
RPI	3	–	3	5	–	5
Rochester	2	–	4	6	–	5
St. Lawrence	2	–	4	3	–	6
Union (NY)	2	–	4	3	–	7
Buffalo State	1	–	5	3	–	7
$ – Conference champion; ^ – NCAA Division III playoff participant

2024 Massachusetts State Collegiate Athletic Conference football standings
	Conf.			Overall
Team	W		L	W		L
UMass Dartmouth $^	9	–	0	10	–	1
Western Connecticut	8	–	1	9	–	2
Plymouth State	5	–	4	5	–	4
Bridgewater State	5	–	4	5	–	5
Massachusetts Maritime	5	–	4	5	–	5
Westfield State	4	–	5	4	–	6
Framingham State	3	–	6	3	–	7
Worcester State	3	–	6	3	–	7
Castleton	2	–	7	3	–	7
Fitchburg State	1	–	8	2	–	8
$ – Conference champion; ^ – NCAA Division III playoff participant

2024 Michigan Intercollegiate Athletic Association football standings
	Conf.			Overall
Team	W		L	W		L
No. 16 Hope $^	7	–	0	11	–	1
Alma	6	–	1	8	–	2
Albion	5	–	2	7	–	3
Trine	4	–	3	6	–	4
Adrian	3	–	4	6	–	4
Olivet	2	–	5	3	–	7
Kalamazoo	1	–	6	4	–	6
Calvin	0	–	7	2	–	8
$ – Conference champion; ^ – NCAA Division III playoff participant; Rankings from D3Football.com

2024 Middle Atlantic Conference football standings
	Conf.			Overall
Team	W		L	W		L
King's (PA) $^	9	–	0	10	–	2
Delaware Valley	7	–	2	8	–	3
FDU–Florham	5	–	4	7	–	4
Eastern	5	–	4	5	–	5
Lebanon Valley	5	–	4	5	–	5
Stevenson	5	–	4	5	–	5
Widener	5	–	4	5	–	6
Misericordia	2	–	7	3	–	7
Albright	1	–	8	2	–	8
Alvernia	1	–	8	1	–	9
$ – Conference champion; ^ – NCAA Division III playoff participant

2024 Midwest Conference football standings
	Conf.			Overall
Team	W		L	W		L
Lake Forest $^	9	–	0	10	–	1
Monmouth (IL)	8	–	1	9	–	2
Illinois College	7	–	2	8	–	2
Chicago	6	–	3	6	–	4
Cornell (IA)	5	–	4	5	–	5
Ripon	4	–	5	4	–	6
Knox	2	–	7	3	–	7
Grinnell	2	–	7	2	–	8
Lawrence	1	–	8	1	–	9
Beloit	1	–	8	1	–	9
$ – Conference champion; ^ – NCAA Division III playoff participant

2024 Minnesota Intercollegiate Athletic Conference football standings
	Div			Conf.			Overall
Team	W		L	W		L	W		L
Northwoods Division
No. 3 Saint John's (MN) xy$^	4	–	0	8	–	0	11	–	1
St. Olaf	2	–	2	5	–	3	7	–	3
Carleton	2	–	2	4	–	4	5	–	5
Gustavus Adolphus	2	–	2	4	–	4	5	–	5
St. Scholastica	0	–	4	3	–	5	4	–	6
Skyline Division
No. 21 Bethel (MN) xy^	4	–	0	6	–	2	11	–	3
Concordia–Moorhead	3	–	1	6	–	2	7	–	3
Augsburg	2	–	2	3	–	5	4	–	6
Hamline	1	–	3	1	–	7	3	–	7
Macalester	0	–	4	0	–	8	0	–	10
Championship: Saint John's (MN) 41, Bethel (MN) 33
$ – Conference champion; x – Division champion/co-champions; y – Championship game participant; ^ – NCAA Division III playoff participant; Rankings from D3Football.com

2024 New England Small College Athletic Conference football standings
	Conf.			Overall
Team	W		L	W		L
Wesleyan $	8	–	1	8	–	1
Trinity (CT)	7	–	2	7	–	2
Tufts	7	–	2	7	–	2
Middlebury	6	–	3	6	–	3
Williams	5	–	4	5	–	4
Colby	4	–	5	4	–	5
Bowdoin	3	–	6	3	–	6
Amherst	2	–	7	2	–	7
Bates	2	–	7	2	–	7
Hamilton	1	–	8	1	–	8
$ – Conference champion

2024 New England Women's and Men's Athletic Conference football standings
	Conf.			Overall
Team	W		L	W		L
No. 23 Springfield $^	7	–	0	12	–	1
Maritime	5	–	2	8	–	3
Salve Regina	5	–	2	6	–	4
WPI	4	–	3	6	–	4
Merchant Marine	3	–	4	5	–	4
Coast Guard	3	–	4	5	–	5
MIT	1	–	6	3	–	6
Norwich	0	–	7	0	–	10
$ – Conference champion; ^ – NCAA Division III playoff participant; Rankings from D3Football.com

2024 New Jersey Athletic Conference football standings
	Conf.			Overall
Team	W		L	W		L
No. 8 Salisbury $^	6	–	0	12	–	1
Christopher Newport	5	–	1	7	–	3
Rowan	4	–	2	6	–	4
TCNJ	3	–	3	6	–	4
Kean	2	–	4	2	–	8
Montclair State	1	–	5	3	–	7
William Paterson	0	–	6	1	–	9
$ – Conference champion; ^ – NCAA Division III playoff participant; Rankings from D3Football.com

2024 North Coast Athletic Conference football standings
	Conf.			Overall
Team	W		L	W		L
No. 9 DePauw $^	8	–	0	11	–	1
Wabash	7	–	1	8	–	3
Denison	6	–	2	6	–	4
Wittenberg	5	–	3	6	–	4
Kenyon	4	–	4	5	–	5
Ohio Wesleyan	3	–	5	4	–	6
Wooster	2	–	6	3	–	7
Oberlin	1	–	7	1	–	9
Hiram	0	–	8	0	–	10
$ – Conference champion; ^ – NCAA Division III playoff participant; Rankings from D3Football.com

2024 Northern Athletics Collegiate Conference football standings
	Conf.			Overall
Team	W		L	W		L
No. 15 Aurora $^	8	–	0	9	–	2
St. Norbert	7	–	1	8	–	3
Wisconsin Lutheran	6	–	2	7	–	3
Concordia (WI)	5	–	3	6	–	3
Lakeland	4	–	4	4	–	5
Benedictine (IL)	3	–	5	5	–	5
Rockford	2	–	6	4	–	6
Concordia (IL)	1	–	7	2	–	8
Eureka	0	–	8	0	–	10
$ – Conference champion; ^ – NCAA Division III playoff participant; Rankings from D3Football.com

2024 Northwest Conference football standings
	Conf.			Overall
Team	W		L	W		L
No. 14 Linfield $^	7	–	0	10	–	2
No. 22 Whitworth ^	6	–	1	10	–	2
Pacific Lutheran	5	–	2	7	–	3
Lewis & Clark	4	–	3	5	–	5
Pacific (OR)	3	–	4	5	–	5
George Fox	2	–	5	4	–	6
Puget Sound	1	–	6	2	–	8
Willamette	0	–	7	2	–	8
$ – Conference champion; ^ – NCAA Division III playoff participant; Rankings from D3Football.com

2024 Ohio Athletic Conference football standings
	Conf.			Overall
Team	W		L	W		L
No. 5 Mount Union $^	9	–	0	14	–	1
No. 24 John Carroll ^	8	–	1	9	–	3
Marietta	7	–	2	8	–	3
Baldwin Wallace	6	–	3	7	–	3
Heidelberg	4	–	5	5	–	5
Muskingum	4	–	5	5	–	5
Ohio Northern	4	–	5	5	–	5
Capital	1	–	8	1	–	9
Otterbein	1	–	8	1	–	9
Wilmington (OH)	1	–	8	1	–	9
$ – Conference champion; ^ – NCAA Division III playoff participant; Rankings from D3Football.com

2024 Old Dominion Athletic Conference football standings
	Conf.			Overall
Team	W		L	W		L
Randolph–Macon $^	7	–	0	10	–	2
Shenandoah	5	–	2	8	–	3
Washington and Lee	5	–	2	7	–	4
Bridgewater	4	–	3	6	–	4
Ferrum	3	–	4	5	–	5
Hampden–Sydney	3	–	4	5	–	5
Averett	1	–	6	3	–	7
Guilford	0	–	7	3	–	7
$ – Conference champion; ^ – NCAA Division III playoff participant

2024 Presidents' Athletic Conference football standings
	Conf.			Overall
Team	W		L	W		L
No. 13 Carnegie Mellon +^	9	–	1	10	–	2
No. 12 Grove City +^	9	–	1	9	–	2
No. 17 Washington & Jefferson +^	9	–	1	9	–	2
Westminster (PA)	7	–	3	8	–	3
Case Western Reserve	6	–	4	6	–	4
Geneva	5	–	5	5	–	5
Waynesburg	4	–	6	4	–	6
Thiel	3	–	7	3	–	7
Allegheny	1	–	9	1	–	9
Bethany (WV)	1	–	9	1	–	9
Saint Vincent	1	–	9	1	–	9
+ – Conference co-champions; ^ – NCAA Division III playoff participant; Rankings from D3Football.com

2024 Southern Athletic Association football standings
	Conf.			Overall
Team	W		L	W		L
Berry +^	6	–	1	8	–	3
Centre +^	6	–	1	8	–	3
Trinity (TX) +^	6	–	1	8	–	3
Millsaps	3	–	4	5	–	5
Hendrix	2	–	5	4	–	6
Southwestern (TX)	2	–	5	4	–	6
Rhodes	2	–	5	3	–	7
Sewanee	1	–	6	2	–	8
+ – Conference co-champions; ^ – NCAA Division III playoff participant

2024 Southern California Intercollegiate Athletic Conference football standings
	Conf.			Overall
Team	W		L	W		L
Sun Division
Pomona-Pitzer xy$^	7	–	1	8	–	3
Redlands	3	–	5	3	–	7
La Verne	0	–	8	0	–	10
Surf Division
Chapman xy	6	–	2	7	–	3
Claremont-Mudd-Scripps	6	–	2	8	–	2
Cal Lutheran	2	–	6	2	–	8
Championship: Pomona-Pitzer 37, Chapman 34
$ – Conference champion; x – Division champion/co-champions; y – Championship game participant; ^ – NCAA Division III playoff participant

2024 Southern Collegiate Athletic Conference football standings
	Conf.			Overall
Team	W		L	W		L
Texas Lutheran +^	7	–	1	9	–	2
McMurry +	7	–	1	7	–	3
Centenary	4	–	4	4	–	6
Austin	2	–	6	2	–	8
Lyon	0	–	8	1	–	9
+ – Conference co-champions; ^ – NCAA Division III playoff participant

2024 Upper Midwest Athletic Conference football standings
	Conf.			Overall
Team	W		L	W		L
Northwestern (MN) $^	7	–	0	7	–	4
Greenville	5	–	2	7	–	3
Martin Luther	4	–	3	6	–	4
Minnesota Morris	4	–	3	5	–	5
Crown	1	–	6	1	–	9
Westminster (MO)	0	–	7	1	–	9
$ – Conference champion; ^ – NCAA Division III playoff participant

2024 USA South Athletic Conference football standings
	Conf.			Overall
Team	W		L	W		L
Maryville (TN) $^	7	–	0	9	–	2
LaGrange	6	–	2	6	–	4
Brevard	5	–	2	6	–	3
Belhaven	5	–	3	5	–	5
Huntingdon	5	–	3	5	–	5
North Carolina Wesleyan	4	–	4	4	–	6
Greensboro	1	–	7	1	–	9
Methodist	1	–	7	1	–	9
Southern Virginia	1	–	7	1	–	9
$ – Conference champion; ^ – NCAA Division III playoff participant

2024 Wisconsin Intercollegiate Athletic Conference football standings
	Conf.			Overall
Team	W		L	W		L
No. 7 Wisconsin–Platteville $^	6	–	1	9	–	2
No. 18 Wisconsin–La Crosse ^	5	–	2	8	–	4
Wisconsin–River Falls	4	–	3	7	–	3
Wisconsin–Oshkosh	4	–	3	6	–	4
Wisconsin–Whitewater	4	–	3	6	–	4
Wisconsin–Stout	4	–	3	6	–	5
Wisconsin–Eau Claire	1	–	6	2	–	8
Wisconsin–Stevens Point	0	–	7	1	–	9
$ – Conference champion; ^ – NCAA Division III playoff participant; Rankings from D3Football.com

2024 NCAA Division III independents football records
	Conf.			Overall
Team	W		L	W		L
Maine Maritime		–		0	–	3

== Postseason ==
=== Teams ===
==== Automatic bids (28) ====
Automatic bids
Conference	School	Record	Appearance	Last
American Rivers	Wartburg	9–1	17th	2023
American Southwest	Hardin–Simmons	10–0	13th	2023
Centennial	Johns Hopkins	9–1	13th	2023
CCIW	North Central (IL)	10–0	16th	2023
ECFC	Alfred State	5–5	2nd	2023
Empire 8	Cortland	10–0	13th	2023
HCAC	Mount St. Joseph	8–2	8th	2023
Landmark	Susquehanna	9–1	6th	2023
Liberty	Hobart	9–1	13th	2016
MASCAC	UMass Dartmouth	10–0	3rd	2022
Michigan	Hope	10–0	6th	2019
Middle Atlantic	King's (PA)	9–1	2nd	2002
Midwest	Lake Forest	10–0	4th	2022
Minnesota	Saint John's (MN)	10–0	29th	2022
NEWMAC	Springfield	10–0	10th	2023
New England	Endicott	9–1	6th	2023
New Jersey	Salisbury	10–0	14th	2022
North Coast	DePauw	10–0	6th	2023
NACC	Aurora	9–1	9th	2023
Northwest	Linfield	9–1	18th	2022
Ohio	Mount Union	10–0	35th	2023
Old Dominion	Randolph–Macon	9–1	7th	2023
Presidents'	Washington & Jefferson	9–1	27th	2018
SAA	Berry	8–2	4th	2019
SCIAC	Pomona-Pitzer	8–2	2nd	2022
Upper Midwest	Northwestern (MN)	7–3	3rd	2022
USA South	Maryville	8–1	3rd	2018
Wisconsin	Wisconsin–Platteville	9–1	3rd	2016

==== At-large bids (12) ====
At-large bids
School	Conference	Record	Appearance	Last
Carnegie Mellon	Presidents'	9–1	9th	2022
Grove City	Presidents'	9–1	2nd	2023
Ursinus	Centennial	9–1	3rd	1999
Whitworth	Northwest	9–1	6th	2023
Texas Lutheran	SCAC	9–1	2nd	2014
Bethel (MN)	Minnesota	8–2	13th	2023
Coe	American Rivers	9–1	11th	2023
Centre	SAA	8–2	4th	2018
Wisconsin–La Crosse	Wisconsin	7–3	15th	2023
Trinity (TX)	SAA	8–2	16th	2023
Mary Hardin–Baylor	American Southwest	6–3	19th	2022
John Carroll	Ohio	8–2	8th	2018

=== Bracket ===
First round November 23; Campus sites ESPN+
*	Wisconsin–La Crosse	59
Northwestern (MN)	14
*	Bethel (MN)	31
Coe	26
*	Endicott	44
Alfred State	0
*	Whitworth	21
Pomona–Pitzer	13
*	Trinity (TX)	22
Mary Hardin–Baylor	29
*	Berry	16
Maryville (TN)	20
*	King's (PA)	32
Ursinus	29
*	John Carroll	52
Mount St. Joseph	7

Second round November 30; Campus sites ESPN+
*	Saint John's (MN)	24
Wisconsin–La Crosse	13
*	Susquehanna	42
Hobart	35
*	Lake Forest	21
Bethel (MN)	48
*	Wartburg	19
Wisconsin–Platteville	14
*	Cortland	17
Endicott	9
*	Springfield	54
UMass Dartmouth	27
*	North Central (IL)	42
Whitworth	17
*	Hope	49
Aurora	21
*	Hardin–Simmons	13
Mary Hardin–Baylor	17
*	Linfield	65
Texas Lutheran	3
*	DePauw	45
Maryville (TN)	20
*	Johns Hopkins	17
Grove City	14
*	Salisbury	33
King's (PA)	13
*	Randolph–Macon	38
Washington & Jefferson	22
*	Mount Union	42
John Carroll	7
*	Carnegie Mellon	24
Centre	15

Third round December 7 Campus sites ESPN+
*	St. John's (MN)	38
Susquehanna	41
Bethel (MN)	24
*	Wartburg	14
*	Cortland	28
Springfield	40
*	North Central (IL)	41
Hope	21
Mary Hardin–Baylor	28
*	Linfield	18
*	DePauw	9
Johns Hopkins	14
*	Salisbury	35
Randolph–Macon	14
*	Mount Union	24
Carnegie Mellon	19

Quarterfinals; December 14; Campus sites ESPN+
*	Susquehanna	24
Bethel (MN)	21
Springfield	3
*	North Central (IL)	27
Mary Hardin–Baylor	10
*	Johns Hopkins	17
*	Salisbury	17
Mount Union	38

Semifinals; December 21; Campus sites USA: ESPN+ Canada: TSN+
Susquehanna	0
*	North Central (IL)	66
Johns Hopkins	37
*	Mount Union	45

Championship; 2025 Stagg Bowl; January 5, 2025; Shell Energy Stadium; Houston, Texas; USA: ESPN/ESPN+ Canada: TSN+
North Central (IL)	41
Mount Union	25

* - Host team

=== Bowl games ===
Division III held 13 bowl games in 2024, featuring teams that did not qualify for the Division III postseason tournament; this is the same number of games contested in 2023 season, but saw the addition of the Fusion Bowl and two bowls organized by NIL company Opendorse, as well as the subtraction of the ECAC Lynah Bowl and the New England Bowl series.

Date	Time (EST)	Game	Site	Television	Teams	Affiliations	Results
Nov 23	Noon	Centennial-MAC; Bowl Series	Campus sites	CentennialTV; MACtv (streaming)	Widener; Muhlenberg*	Centennial; MAC	Muhlenberg 34; Widener 7
Nov 23	Noon	Centennial-MAC; Bowl Series	Campus sites	CentennialTV; MACtv (streaming)	Franklin & Marshall; Delaware Valley*	Centennial; MAC	Franklin & Marshall 7 Delaware Valley 0
Nov 23	Noon	Centennial-MAC; Bowl Series	Campus sites	CentennialTV; MACtv (streaming)	Dickinson; FDU–Florham*	Centennial; MAC	FDU–Florham 49; Dickinson 14
Nov 23	Noon	Whitelaw Bowl	Campus sites		Stevenson; Morrisville*	MAC; Empire 8	Morrisville 21; Stevenson 18
Nov 23	Noon	Chapman Bowl	Campus sites		Rochester; Brockport*	Liberty; Empire 8	Brockport 42; Rochester 23
Nov 23	Noon	Bushnell Bowl	Campus sites		Alfred; Western Connecticut*	Empire 8 MASCAC	Western Connecticut 45; Alfred 14
Nov 23	Noon	Lakefront Bowl	Raabe Stadium; Wauwatosa, Wisconsin		Monmouth (IL); St. Norbert	MWC; NACC	St. Norbert 20; Monmouth (IL) 14
Nov 23	1:00 pm	Fusion Bowl	Campus sites	Northeast Sports Network	Husson; Maritime*	CNE; NEWMAC	Maritime 21; Husson 14
Nov 23	1:00 pm	Cape Henry Bowl	Salem Football Stadium; Salem, Virginia	ODAC Sports Network (streaming)	Wilkes; Washington & Lee	Landmark; ODAC	Washington & Lee 40; Wilkes 21
Nov 23	5:00 pm	Cape Charles Bowl	Salem Football Stadium; Salem, Virginia	ODAC Sports Network (streaming)	Moravian; Shenandoah	Landmark; ODAC	Moravian 35; Shenandoah 14
Nov 23	3:00 pm	Isthmus Bowl	Bank of Sun Prairie Stadium; Sun Prairie, Wisconsin		Wisconsin–Stout; Wheaton (IL)	WIAC; CCIW	Wheaton (IL) 35; Wisconsin-Stout 32
Nov 23	1:00 pm	ForeverLawn Bowl	Tom Benson Hall of Fame Stadium; Canton, Ohio	FloSports	Hanover; Wabash	HCAC; NCAC	Hanover 13; Wabash 10
Nov 23	6:00 pm	Extra Points Bowl	Tom Benson Hall of Fame Stadium; Canton, Ohio	FloSports	Marietta; Westminster (PA)	OAC; PAC	Westminster (PA) 27; Marietta 13

* - Host team

== Coaching changes ==
=== Preseason and in-season ===
This is restricted to coaching changes that took place on or after May 1, 2024, and will include any changes announced after a team's last regularly scheduled games but before its playoff games.

School	Outgoing coach	Date	Reason	Replacement	Previous position
TCNJ	Casey Goff	May 7, 2024	Hired as head coach for Brooke HS (WV)	Eric Jendryaszek (interim)	TCNJ offensive line coach (2022–2023)
Castleton	Tony Volpone	May 9, 2024	Resigned	Tyler Higley (interim; named full-time on June 13)	Castleton defensive coordinator (2022–2023)
Westfield State	Pete Kowalski	May 21, 2024	Retired	Lou Conte	American International head coach (2023)
Chicago	Todd Gilcrist Jr.	July 5, 2024	Resigned	Max Andrews (full-season interim)	Chicago offensive line coach (2023)
Otterbein	Tommy Zagorski	July 12, 2024	Resigned	Jake Schaefer (full-season interim)	Otterbein offensive coordinator and quarterbacks coach (2023)
Southwestern (TX)	Joe Austin	July 26, 2024	Retired	Bill Kriesel (interim; named full-time on November 5)	Southwestern (TX) associate head coach, defensive coordinator, and defensive backs coach (2023)
Worcester State	Adam Peloquin	August 6, 2024	Resigned	Zach Besaw (full-season interim)	Worcester State defensive backs coach (2020–2023)
Maine Maritime	Calvin Powell	October 11, 2024	Resigned	Bill Mottola Jr. (interim)	Lely HS (FL) head coach (2014–2023)
Millikin	Carlton Hall	October 27, 2024	Fired	Patrick Allgeier (interim)	Millikin offensive line coach (1996–2024)

=== End of season ===
This list includes coaching changes announced during the season that did not take effect until the end of the season.

School	Outgoing coach	Date	Reason	Replacement	Previous position
Wabash	Don Morel	September 2024	Retired (effective at before team's bowl game)	Jake Gilbert	Wabash defensive coordinator (2024)
Anna Maria	Steve Croce	October 17, 2024	Retired (effective at season's end)	Tanner Kingsley	Anna Maria associate head coach, offensive coordinator, and quarterbacks coach (2024)
Dean	Andrae Murphy	November 7, 2024	Fired (effective before conference playoffs)	Eric Desmond Lee (interim)	Dean athletic director
Illinois Wesleyan	Norm Eash	November 10, 2024	Retired (effective at season's end)	Jared Williamson	Roosevelt head coach (2020–2024)
Saint Vincent	Aaron Smetanka	November 13, 2024	Fired	Casey Goff	Brooke HS (WV) head coach (2024)
Olivet	Dan Musielewicz	November 18, 2024	Fired	Erik Ieuter	Muskingum head coach (2018–2024)
St. John Fisher	Paul Vosburgh	November 19, 2024	Retired	Ed Raby Jr.	Morrisville head coach (2020–2024)
Franklin (IN)	Alan Hensell	November 22, 2024	Fired	Mike Leonard	Franklin (IN) head coach (2003–2019)
Albright	Isaac Collins	November 25, 2024	Moved to administrative position	Shaun Weaver	Frostburg State defensive line coach and recruiting coordinator (2024)
Hiram	Jack Mrozinski	November 26, 2024	Fired	Xavier Dupree	Catawba wide receivers coach (2023–2024)
Marietta	Andy Waddle	December 9, 2024	Hired as head coach by Valparaiso	Tom Kaufman	Gilmour Academy (OH) head coach (2023–2024)
Muskingum	Erik Ieuter	December 10, 2024	Resigned	Matt Nardo	Bluffton head coach (2022–2024)
Hartwick	Mark Carr	December 13, 2024	Retired	Matt Rogers	Wilkes offensive coordinator and quarterbacks coach (2024)
Millikin	Patrick Allgeier (interim)	December 16, 2024	Permanent replacement hired	Billy Riebock	Midwestern State offensive coordinator and quarterbacks coach (2023–2024)
Maine Maritime	Bill Mottola Jr. (interim)	December 17, 2024	Permanent replacement hired	Nick Sheehan	Maine Maritime offensive coordinator and strength and conditioning coach (2024)
Otterbein	Jake Schaefer (interim)	December 19, 2024	Permanent replacement hired	Dave Marquis	Valparaiso co-defensive coordinator and defensive backs coach (2023–2024)
Worcester State	Zach Besaw (interim)	December 19, 2024	Permanent replacement hired	Lazaro Mitjans Jr.	Harvard running backs coach (2023–2024)
Cortland	Curt Fitzpatrick	December 21, 2024	Hired as head coach by Colgate	Tom Blumenauer	Franklin & Marshall head coach (2022–2024)
Dean	Eric Desmond Lee (interim)	January 9, 2025	Permanent replacemint hired	Luke Bakanowsky	New England (NH) offensive coordinator and quarterbacks coach (2024)
La Verne	Chris Kirch	January 10, 2025	Hired as associate head coach and general manager by Southwestern (CA)	Richard Sanchez	Cardinal Newman HS (CA) head coach (2021–2024)
Elmhurst	Mike Murray	January 13, 2025	Resigned	Mike Heffernan	St. Scholastica head coach (2019–2024)
Lewis & Clark	Joe Bushman	January 13, 2025	Hired as head coach by Casteel HS (AZ)	Brett Elliott	Linfield offensive coordinator and quarterbacks coach (2019–2024)
George Fox	Chris Casey	January 14, 2025	Retired	Spencer Crace	Pacific Lutheran assistant head coach, offensive coordinator, and quarterbacks coach (2024)
Wooster	Frank Colaprete	January 20, 2025	Hired as head coach by Cardinal Mooney HS (OH)	Austin Holter	Wooster HS (OH) head coach (2021–2024)
Chicago	Max Andrews (interim)	February 5, 2025	Permanent replacement hired	Craig Knoche	Walter Payton College Preparatory HS head coach (2020–2024)
Howard Payne	Kevin Bachtel	February 5, 2025	Resigned	Coby Gipson	Lamar assistant head coach and wide receivers coach (2022–2024)
Bluffton	Matt Nardo	February 11, 2025	Hired as head coach by Muskingum	Chris Hedden	Trine offensive coordinator (2024)
Cornell (IA)	Dan Pifer	February 11, 2025	Resigned	Curt Ritchie	Williamsburg HS (IA) head coach (2001–2024)
Schreiner	Kenny Treschitta	February 11, 2025	Resigned	Keith Allen	Klein HS (TX) offensive coordinator (2022–2024)
Franklin & Marshall	Tom Blumenauer	February 13, 2025	Hired as head coach by Cortland	Michael Phelan	Franklin & Marshall defensive coordinator (2022–2024)
Misericordia	Tyler Cottle (interim)	February 14, 2025	Permanent replacement hired	Steve Cushing	Cortland defensive coordinator and linebackers coach (2021–2024)
St. Scholastica	Mike Heffernan	February 15, 2025	Hired as head coach by Elmhurst	Matt Bremer	St. Scholastica assistant head coach, offensive coordinator, and quarterbacks coach (2020–2024)
Morrisville	Ed Raby Jr.	February 18, 2025	Hired as head coach by St. John Fisher	Eric Jendryaszek	TCNJ interim head coach (2024)
TCNJ	Eric Jendryaszek (interim)	February 24, 2025	Permanent replacement hired	Tyler Moody	Stonehill associate head coach, offensive coordinator, and quarterbacks coach (2020–2024)
Lebanon Valley	J. R. Drake	February 28, 2025	Resigned	Chris Thompson (interim; named full-time on December 11)	Lebanon Valley offensive coordinator and quarterbacks coach (2021–2024)
Gallaudet	Chuck Goldstein	March 11, 2025	Resigned	Stefan LeFors	Parkview Baptist HS (LA) head coach (2019–2024)
Beloit	Ted Soenksen	March 19, 2025	Resigned	Kyle Langhoff	Beloit associate head coach and defensive coordinator (2019–2024)
Keystone	Justin Higgins	April 24, 2025	Resigned	Hugh Kirwan	Keystone special teams coordinator and passing game coordinator (2019–2024)

== See also ==
- 2024 NCAA Division I FBS football season
- 2024 NCAA Division I FCS football season
- 2024 NCAA Division II football season
- 2024 NAIA football season
- 2024 U Sports football season
