= Matt Rogers (American football) =

American football coach (born 1993 or 1994)

Current position
- Title: Head coach
- Team: Hartwick
- Conference: Empire 8
- Record: 4–6

Biographical details
- Born: c. 1993 or 1994 (age 32–33); East Syracuse, New York, U.S.
- Education: Utica College (2016, 2019)

Playing career

Football
- 2012–2015: Utica

Tennis
- 2013–2016: Utica
- Position: Quarterback (football)

Coaching career (HC unless noted)

Football
- 2016–2018: Utica (RB)
- 2019: Wilkes (RB)
- 2020: Morrisville (OC)
- 2021–2022: Morrisville (OC/QB/RC)
- 2023: Morrisville (AHC/OC/QB/RC)
- 2024: Wilkes (OC/QB)
- 2025–present: Hartwick

Head coaching record
- Overall: 4–6

Matt Rogers (born c. 1993 or 1994) is an American college football coach. He is the head football coach for Hartwick College, a position he has held since 2025. He also coached for Utica, Wilkes, and Morrisville. He played college football for Utica as a quarterback.

== Playing career ==
Rogers grew up in East Syracuse, New York, and attended Bishop Ludden Junior/Senior High School where he played high school football under his father, Mike. He also played basketball as a point guard. Rogers then attended Utica, where he was a member of the football and tennis teams. As a member of the football team, he was a two-time team captain.

Rogers graduated with a bachelor's and master's degree in journalism from Utica.

== Coaching career ==
Rogers began his career immediately after graduating in 2016 as the running backs coach under his former head coach Blaise Faggiano at Utica. After three seasons, he accepted the same position with Wilkes. In 2020, he was hired by Morrisville as the team's offensive coordinator. After one season he added the roles of quarterbacks coach and recruiting coordinator. In 2023, he was promoted once again, this time to assistant head coach to Ed Raby Jr. In 2024, after four years with Morrisville, Rogers opted to return to Wilkes as the offensive coordinator and quarterbacks coach. With Wilkes, he helped lead the team to a "record-breaking offense" which ranked top 50 nationally in rushing, scoring, red-zone efficiency, and first downs.

Throughout his time as an assistant coach, Rogers would receive criticism from texts that his father would send him after every game. He also credits his father with being his biggest inspiration.

In 2025, Rogers was hired as the head football coach for Hartwick College. He succeeded long-time head coach Mark Carr who retired after 23 years as head coach. He took over a program that averaged around two wins over the last decade of play.

== Head coaching record ==
Year	Team	Overall	Conference	Standing	Bowl/playoffs
Hartwick Hawks (Empire 8) (2025–present)
2025	Hartwick	4–6	1–6	7th	
2026	Hartwick	0–0	0–0		
Hartwick:		4–6	1–6		
Total:		4–6			
