= List of Empire 8 champions =

Empire 8
- Formerly: Independent College Athletic Conference (1964–1991); Empire Athletic Association (1991–1999)
- Conference: NCAA
- Founded: 1964
- Commissioner: Chuck Mitrano (since 2001)
- Sports fielded: 22; men's: 11; women's: 11
- Division: Division III
- No. of teams: 12 (9 full, 3 associate)
- Headquarters: Rochester, New York
- Region: New York, New Jersey
- Official website: empire8.com

Locations
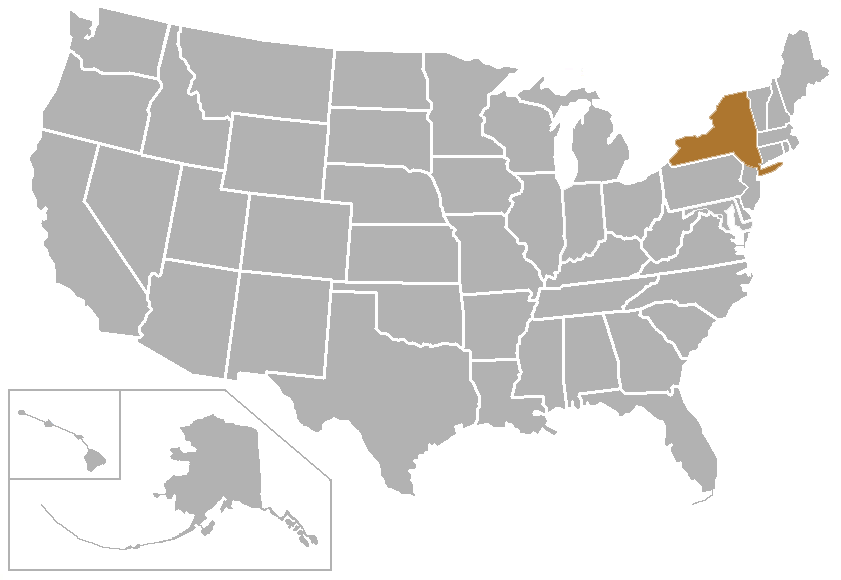

The Empire 8 (E8) is an intercollegiate athletic conference affiliated with the NCAA's Division III. The E8 sponsors intercollegiate athletic competition in men's baseball, men's and women's basketball, men's and women's cross country, women's field hockey, men's football, men's golf, men's and women's lacrosse, men's and women's soccer, women's softball, men's and women's swimming and diving, men's and women's tennis, men's and women's track and field, and women's volleyball.

While men's volleyball is listed on the E8 website as a sponsored sport, the conference does not directly sponsor the sport. All E8 men's volleyball teams compete in the United Volleyball Conference, a separate league that shares offices with the E8.

== Basketball ==
Alfred University, Elmira College, Hartwick College, Ithaca College, Nazareth College, Rochester Institute of Technology, St. John Fisher College, Stevens Institute of Technology, and Utica College compete in Empire 8 basketball. Both the men's and women's basketball championships were first held in 2002.

=== Men's ===
==== Champions ====
- 2000: RIT
- 2001: St. John Fisher College
- 2002: Ithaca College
- 2003: St. John Fisher College
- 2004: St. John Fisher College
- 2005: St. John Fisher College
- 2006: St. John Fisher College
- 2007: St. John Fisher College
- 2008: Nazareth College
- 2009: RIT
- 2010: Nazareth College
- 2011: Hartwick College
- 2012: Ithaca College
- 2013: Ithaca College
- 2014: Hartwick College
- 2015: St. John Fisher College
- 2016: Hartwick College
- 2017: St. John Fisher College
- 2018: Nazareth College
- 2019: Alfred University
- 2020: St. John Fisher College
- 2021: Utica College
- 2022: Nazareth College
- 2023: St. John Fisher College
- 2024: Utica College
- 2025: Utica College

==== Player of the year ====
- 2000: Pat Britton (Ithaca)
- 2001: Devon Downing (Alfred), Brandon Redmond (RIT)
- 2002: Brandon Redmond (RIT)
- 2003: Jim Evans (Nazareth)
- 2004: Tyler Schulz (Ithaca)
- 2005: James "Big Game" Watkins (Hartwick College)
- 2006: Matthew Simoneschi (Hartwick College)
- 2007: Matthew Simoneschi (Hartwick College)
- 2008: Matthew Simoneschi (Hartwick College)
- 2009: Sean Burton (Ithaca)

==== Rookie of the year ====
- 2000: DeWaun Cheatham (Utica)
- 2001: David Orr (Hartwick)
- 2002: Jeff Sidney (St. John Fisher)
- 2003: Fran Snyder (RIT)
- 2004: Dillon Stein (Alfred)
- 2005: Matthew Simoneschi(Hartwick)
- 2006: Jan Cocozziello (Hartwick)
- 2007: Corey McAdam (Nazareth)
- 2008: Shane Foster (RIT), Ozell Franklin (St. John Fisher)
- 2009: Mark Blazek (Hartwick)

==== Coach of the year ====
- 2000: Bob McVean (RIT)
- 2001: Jay Murphy (Alfred)
- 2002: Jim Mullins (Ithaca)
- 2003: Rob Kornaker (St. John Fisher)
- 2004: Rob Kornaker (St. John Fisher)
- 2005: Rob Kornaker (St. John Fisher)
- 2006: Andy Goodemote (Utica), Rob Kornaker (St. John Fisher)
- 2007: Rob Kornaker (St. John Fisher)
- 2008: Jim Mullins (Ithaca)
- 2009: Jim Mullins (Ithaca)

=== Women's ===
==== Champions ====
- 2002: Ithaca College
- 2003: St. John Fisher College
- 2004: Ithaca College
- 2005: Ithaca College
- 2006: St. John Fisher College
- 2007: Ithaca College
- 2008: Utica College
- 2009: Stevens Institute of Technology

==== Player of the year ====
- 2000: Amanda Waloven (St. John Fisher)
- 2001: Tiffany Hurley (Hartwick)
- 2002: Tiffany Hurley (Hartwick)
- 2003: Kerri Brown (Ithaca)
- 2004: Jennifer Parker (Elmira)
- 2005: Stephanie Cleary (Ithaca)
- 2006: Melissa Hartman (St. John Fisher)
- 2007: Ava Thomas (Utica)
- 2008: Dani Dudek (Stevens)
- 2009: Dani Dudek (Stevens)

==== Rookie of the year ====
- 2000: Roxanne Simpson (Utica)
- 2001: Jennie Swatling (Ithaca)
- 2002: Kadi Burgess (Nazareth)
- 2003: Jennifer Parker (Elmira)
- 2004: Lindsay Wilson (Hartwick)
- 2005: Kourtney Troutman (Elmira)
- 2006: Whitney Frament (Utica)
- 2007: Whitney Smith (Nazareth)
- 2008: Jessica Berry (Utica)
- 2009: Sharon Dennis (RIT)

==== Coach of the year ====
- 2000: Jennifer Kroll (Ithaca)
- 2001: Dan Raymond (Ithaca), Laura Hungerford (RIT)
- 2002: Dan Raymond (Ithaca)
- 2003: Michele Davis (Utica)
- 2004: Daphne Thompson (Hartwick)
- 2005: Dan Raymond (Ithaca)
- 2006: Matt Donohue (Elmira)
- 2007: Deb Buff (RIT)
- 2008: Jon Hochberg (Stevens)
- 2009: Dan Raymond (Ithaca)

== Football ==
Alfred University, Hartwick College, Ithaca College, St. John Fisher College, Frostburg State University, Salisbury University, Buffalo State University and Utica College compete in Empire 8 football as of 2011 season. The men's football championship was first held in 2002.

=== Champions ===
- 2002: Ithaca College
- 2003: Ithaca College
- 2004: Ithaca College, St. John Fisher College
- 2005: Ithaca College
- 2006: Springfield College, St. John Fisher College
- 2007: Hartwick College, St. John Fisher College
- 2008: Ithaca College
- 2009: Alfred University, St. John Fisher College
- 2010: Alfred University
- 2011: Salisbury University
- 2012: Salisbury University
- 2013: Ithaca College
- 2015: SUNY Cortland
- 2016: Alfred University (Goon Squad)

=== Player of the Year ===
- 2002: Dan Pincelli (Hartwick)
- 2003: Jesse Raynor (Alfred)
- 2004: Brenton Brady (Alfred)
- 2005: Josh Felicetti (Ithaca)

The Player of the Year award was discontinued in favor of Offensive and Defensive Player of the Year Awards in 2006.

=== Offensive Player of the Year ===
- 2006: Chris Sharpe (Springfield)
- 2007: Jason Boltus (Hartwick)
- 2008: Jason Boltus (Hartwick)
- 2009: Jared Manzer (Alfred)
- 2010: Tim Bailey (St. John Fisher)
- 2011: Dan Griffin (Salisbury)
- 2012: Andrew Benkwitt (Utica)

=== Defensive Player of the Year ===
- 2006: Gene Lang (St. John Fisher)
- 2007: Steve Stepnick (St. John Fisher)
- 2008: Matt Scalice (Ithaca)
- 2009: Andy Episcopo (St. John Fisher)
- 2010: Nick Clark (Alfred)
- 2011: Nick Clark (Alfred)
- 2012: Mike Raplee (Alfred)

=== Rookie of the year ===
- 2002: Josh Fellicetti (Ithaca)
- 2003: Aaron Meyers (Alfred)
- 2004: Jamie Donovan (Ithaca)
- 2005: Jason Boltus (Hartwick)
- 2006: Jared Manzer (Alfred)
- 2007: Jason Springer (Norwich)
- 2008: Tom Secky (Alfred)
- 2009: Andrew Benkwitt (Utica)
- 2010: Austin Dwyer (Alfred)
- 2011: J.D. Hook (Frostburg)
- 2012: Maleke Fuentes (Alfred)

=== Coach of the Year ===
- 2002: Paul Vosburgh (St. John Fisher)
- 2003: Mike Welch (Ithaca)
- 2004: Paul Vosburgh (St. John Fisher)
- 2005: Dave Murray (Alfred)
- 2006: Mike DeLong (Springfield)
- 2007: Mark Carr (Hartwick)
- 2008: Mike Welch (Ithaca)
- 2009: Dave Murray (Alfred)
- 2010: Dave Murray (Alfred)
- 2011: Sherman Wood (Salisbury)
- 2012: Sherman Wood (Salisbury)

== Golf ==
Elmira College, Hartwick College, Nazareth College, St. John Fisher College and Utica College compete in Empire 8 golf. The men's golf championship was first held in 2001.

=== Champions ===
- 2001: St. John Fisher College
- 2002: Nazareth College
- 2003: Nazareth College
- 2004: St. John Fisher College
- 2005: St. John Fisher College
- 2006: St. John Fisher College
- 2007: St. John Fisher College
- 2008: St. John Fisher College

=== Player of the year ===
- 2001: Nicklaus Ambrose (Nazareth)
- 2002: Jason Baker (St. John Fisher)
- 2003: Brian Seeley (Nazareth)
- 2004: Mike Stackus (St. John Fisher)
- 2005: Zach Fuller (St. John Fisher)
- 2006:
- 2007: Scott Harris (St. John Fisher)
- 2008: Scott Harris (St. John Fisher)

=== Rookie of the year ===
- 2002: Kevin Kaye (Nazareth)
- 2003: Derrick Wong (St. John Fisher)
- 2004: Scott McNeil (Utica)
- 2005: Dave McKenna (Elmira)
- 2006:
- 2007: Tom Muto (St. John Fisher)
- 2008: Ben Herrmann (Nazareth)

=== Coach of the year ===
- 2002: Marty Coddington (Nazareth)
- 2003: Not Awarded
- 2004: Bob Simms (St. John Fisher)
- 2005: Bob Simms (St. John Fisher)
- 2006:
- 2007: Marty Coddington (Nazareth)
- 2008: Marty Coddington (Nazareth), Bob Simms (St. John Fisher)

== Soccer ==
Alfred University, Elmira College, Ithaca College, Nazareth College, Rochester Institute of Technology, St. John Fisher College, Stevens Institute of Technology, and Utica College compete in Empire 8 men's soccer. The same schools with the addition of Hartwick College compete in Empire 8 women's soccer. The men's and women's soccer championships were first held in 2001.

=== Men's ===
==== Champions ====
- 2001: Alfred University, Rochester Institute of Technology
- 2002: Ithaca College
- 2003: Alfred University, Nazareth College
- 2004: Rochester Institute of Technology
- 2005: Nazareth College, Rochester Institute of Technology
- 2006: Nazareth College
- 2007: Stevens Institute of Technology
- 2008: Stevens Institute of Technology
- 2009: Stevens Institute of Technology
- 2010: Stevens Institute of Technology
- 2011: Stevens Institute of Technology
- 2012: Stevens Institute of Technology
- 2013: Stevens Institute of Technology

==== Player of the Year ====
- 1999: Steve Fisher (Nazareth)
- 2000: Steve Fisher (Nazareth)
- 2001: Cody Ostrum (RIT)
- 2002: Brian Lenzo (RIT)
- 2003: Jefferson Dargout (Nazareth)
- 2004: Mike Lawson (RIT)
- 2005: Mike Lawson (RIT)
- 2007: Luke Lennox (St. John Fisher)
- 2008: Terrence "T-Baby" Johnson (Stevens)
- 2009: Nolan "Batigol" Sandberg (Stevens)
- 2010: Nolan "Batigol" Sandberg (Stevens)
- 2011: Ryan Giggs (Stevens)
- 2012: Paul Scholes (Stevens)
- 2012: 1rep (Stevens)

The Player of the Year award was suspended in 2006 in favor of Offensive and Defensive Player of the Year Awards. The award was reinstated in 2007 for men's soccer only.

==== Offensive Player of the Year ====
- 2006: Kurt Odenbach (Ithaca)

==== Defensive Player of the Year ====
- 2006: Mohammed Ahamed (Nazareth)

==== Rookie of the Year ====
- 1999: Keith McManus (Elmira)
- 2000: Trae Lower (RIT)
- 2001: Ben Visnyei (Ithaca)
- 2002: Mike Lawson (RIT)
- 2003: Bobby Linaberry (Alfred)
- 2004: Adam Blanchard (St. John Fisher)
- 2005: Eric Ferguson (Ithaca), Chris Somers (RIT)
- 2006: Andrew Canterbury (Elmira)
- 2007: Andrew McIntosh (St. John Fisher)
- 2008: Andy Alaimo (Nazareth)

==== Doug May Memorial Coach of the Year ====
- 1999: Keith McManus (Nazareth)
- 2000: Bill Garno (RIT)
- 2001: Ken Hassler (Alfred)
- 2002: Andy Byrne (Ithaca)
- 2003: Ken Hassler (Alfred)
- 2004: Andy Byrne (Ithaca)
- 2005: Andy Byrne (Ithaca)
- 2006: Bill Garno (RIT)
- 2007: Steve Christenson (Utica)
- 2008: Andy Byrne (Ithaca)

=== Women's ===
==== Champions ====
- 2001: Nazareth College
- 2002: Ithaca College, Nazareth College
- 2003: Ithaca College, Nazareth College
- 2004: Ithaca College, Nazareth College
- 2005: Ithaca College, Nazareth College
- 2006: Nazareth College
- 2007: Ithaca College
- 2008: Ithaca College

==== Player of the Year ====
- 1999: Michelle Urbanski (Nazareth)
- 2000: Erin DeMarco (Ithaca)
- 2001: Jaime Snyder (Nazareth)
- 2002: Heidi Brown (Nazareth)
- 2003: Katie Allardice (Elmira)
- 2004: Kristina Cristofori (Nazareth)
- 2005: Ashley Williams (Ithaca)

The Player of the Year award was discontinued in favor of Offensive and Defensive Player of the Year Awards in 2006.

==== Offensive Player of the Year ====
- 2006: Chelsey Feldman (Ithaca)
- 2007: Chelsey Feldman (Ithaca)
- 2008: Amy Scheffer (Ithaca)

==== Defensive Player of the Year ====
- 2006: Ashley Williams (Ithaca)
- 2007: Nikki Rice (Ithaca)
- 2008: Salme Cook (Stevens)

==== Rookie of the Year ====
- 1999: Stephanie Nardini (Nazareth)
- 2000: Becca Berry (Ithaca)
- 2001: Rachel Thau (Ithaca)
- 2002: Jennifer Tuttle (Elmira)
- 2003: Ashley Baker (Utica)
- 2004: Becca Malinowski (Hartwick)
- 2005: Chelsey Feldman (Ithaca)
- 2006: Danielle Smith (Utica)
- 2007: Erica Conte (Nazareth)
- 2008: Kaylee Benz (Nazareth)

==== Coach of the Year ====
- 1999: Gail Mann (Nazareth), Kate Stoehr (Utica)
- 2000: Tom Natalie (RIT)
- 2001: Jill McCabe (St. John Fisher)
- 2002: Franco Bari (Elmira)
- 2003: Jessica Critchlow (Utica)
- 2004: Mindy Quigg (Ithaca)
- 2005: Jill McCabe (St. John Fisher)
- 2006: Tom Natalie (RIT)
- 2007: Mindy Quigg (Ithaca)
- 2008: Mindy Quigg (Ithaca)

== Volleyball ==
Alfred University, Elmira College, Hartwick College, Ithaca College, Nazareth College, Rochester Institute of Technology, St. John Fisher College, Stevens Institute of Technology, and Utica College compete in Empire 8 volleyball. The women's volleyball championship was first held in 2001.

=== Champions ===
- 2001: Nazareth College
- 2002: Nazareth College
- 2003: Nazareth College
- 2004: Ithaca College
- 2005: Ithaca College
- 2006: Nazareth College
- 2007: Stevens Institute of Technology
- 2008: Stevens Institute of Technology

=== Player of the Year ===
- 2000: Leah Malliris (Elmira)
- 2001: Christa Downey (Nazareth)
- 2002: Christa Downey (Nazareth)
- 2003: Tricia Jones (Nazareth)
- 2004: Tricia Jones (Nazareth)
- 2005: Christina Anabel (RIT)
- 2006: Amanda Hubbard (Ithaca)
- 2007: Melissa Rhode (Stevens)
- 2008: Melanie Volk (Stevens)

=== Libero/Defensive Player of the Year ===
- 2006: Mary Schaefer (Ithaca)
- 2007: Jenna Waldron (St. John Fisher)
- 2008: Mallory Clary (Nazareth)

=== Rookie of the Year ===
- 2000: Not Awarded
- 2001: Sarah Ballard (RIT), Lori Wilkinson (St. John Fisher)
- 2002: Chris Anabel (RIT)
- 2003: Colleen Kiser (St. John Fisher)
- 2004: Katie Hause (Ithaca)
- 2005: Alyssa Ziobrowski (St. John Fisher)
- 2006: Corinna Doctor (Ithaca)
- 2007: Christina Evans (Hartwick)
- 2008: Audrey Zimmerman (Nazareth)

=== Coach of the Year ===
- 2000: Rhonda Faunce (Elmira)
- 2001: Linda Downey (Nazareth)
- 2002: Linda Downey (Nazareth)
- 2003: Roger Worsley (RIT)
- 2004: Janet Donovan (Ithaca)
- 2005: Jim Chan (St. John Fisher)
- 2006: Cal Wickens (Nazareth)
- 2007: J.J. O'Connell (Stevens)
- 2008: J.J. O'Connell (Stevens)

== Baseball ==
Hartwick College, Ithaca College, Rochester Institute of Technology, St. John Fisher College and Utica College compete in Empire 8 baseball. The baseball championship was first held in 2002.

=== Champions ===
- 2002: Ithaca College
- 2003: Ithaca College
- 2004: Ithaca College
- 2005: Ithaca College
- 2006: Ithaca College
- 2007: Ithaca College
- 2008: Ithaca College

=== Player of the Year ===
- 2002: Geoff Osborne (St. John Fisher)
- 2003: Kyle Wilkins (Ithaca)
- 2004: Andy Campbell (St. John Fisher)
- 2005: Andy Campbell (St. John Fisher)
- 2006: Matt Fuller (St. John Fisher)
- 2007: Geoff Dornes (RIT)
- 2008: Geoff Dornes (RIT)

=== Rookie of the Year ===
- 2002: Nick Bergman (St. John Fisher)
- 2003: Andy Campbell (St. John Fisher)
- 2004: Chris Botsford (St. John Fisher)
- 2005: Rob Raux (Ithaca)
- 2006: Drew Ash (Ithaca)
- 2007: Geoff Dornes (RIT)
- 2008: David Ahonen (Ithaca)

=== Pitcher of the Year ===
- 2007: Dylan Rees (RIT)
- 2008: Bryan Gardner (Ithaca)

=== Coach of the Year ===
- 2002: Barry Shelton (Hartwick), George Valesente (Ithaca)
- 2003: George Valesente (Ithaca)
- 2004: George Valesente (Ithaca)
- 2005: George Valesente (Ithaca)
- 2006: George Valensente (Ithaca)
- 2007: Dan Pepicelli (St. John Fisher)
- 2008: George Valesente (Ithaca), Rob Grow (RIT)

== Softball ==
Alfred University, Elmira College, Hartwick College, Ithaca College, Rochester Institute of Technology, St. John Fisher College and Utica College compete in Empire 8 softball. The women's softball championship was first held in 2002.

=== Champions ===
- 2002: Ithaca College
- 2003: Ithaca College
- 2004: Ithaca College
- 2005: Ithaca College
- 2006: Ithaca College
- 2007: Ithaca College
- 2008: St. John Fisher College
- 2009: St. John Fisher College

=== Player of the Year ===
- 2000: Robin Bimson (Ithaca)
- 2001: Laura Remia (Ithaca)
- 2002: Shari McNamara (RIT)
- 2003: Shari McNamara (RIT)
- 2004: Zahida Sherman (Ithaca)
- 2005: Leigh Bonkowski (Ithaca)
- 2006: Kaitlyn Dulac (Ithaca)
- 2007: Hannah Shalett (Ithaca)
- 2008: Erica Cutspec (Ithaca), Sara Dresser (St. John Fisher)

=== Pitcher of the Year ===
- 2007: Nicole Cade (Ithaca)
- 2008: Carly Myers (Ithaca)

=== Rookie of the Year ===
- 2000: Amanda Kent (St. John Fisher)
- 2001: Shari McNamara (RIT)
- 2002: Abby Pelot (Ithaca)
- 2003: Leigh Bonkowski (Ithaca)
- 2004: Zahida Sherman (Ithaca)
- 2005: Carly Myers (Ithaca)
- 2006: Ashlee McBride-Krause (St. John Fisher)
- 2007: Sarah Gates (St. John Fisher)
- 2008: Emily McPherson (RIT)

=== Coach of the Year ===
- 2000: Deb Pallozzi (Ithaca)
- 2001: Jack Carpenter (RIT), Deb Pallozzi (Ithaca)
- 2002: Jack Carpenter (RIT), Deb Pallozzi (Ithaca)
- 2003: Deb Pallozzi (Ithaca)
- 2004: Len Maiorani (St. John Fisher)
- 2005: Jack Carpenter (RIT)
- 2006: Pat Mineo (Utica)
- 2007: Deb Pallozzi (Ithaca)
- 2008: Gino Olivieri (Alfred)

== Field hockey ==
Elmira College, Hartwick College, Ithaca College, Nazareth College, Stevens Institute of Technology, Utica College, and Washington & Jefferson College compete in Empire 8 field hockey. The women's field hockey championship was first held in 2002.

=== Champions ===
- 2002: Hartwick College
- 2003: Ithaca College
- 2004: Hartwick College
- 2005: Hartwick College
- 2006: Ithaca College, Utica College
- 2007: Nazareth College
- 2008: Stevens Institute of Technology

=== Player of the Year ===
- 2002: Tara Wilkes (Hartwick)
- 2003: Tara Wilkes (Hartwick)
- 2004: Kelly Cooman (Hartwick)
- 2005: Tasha Snowden (Ithaca)
- 2006: Katie Kutas (Utica)
- 2007: Kelly Miranda (Nazareth)
- 2008:

=== Rookie of the Year ===
- 2002: Natasha Snowden (Ithaca)
- 2003: Riana Bovill (Elmira)
- 2004: Danielle Fiore (Utica)
- 2005: Katie Kutas (Utica)
- 2006: Courtney Geddis (Stevens)
- 2007: Lauren Griggs (Stevens)
- 2008:

=== Coach of the Year ===
- 2002: Bern Macca (Elmira)
- 2003: Bern Macca (Elmira), Pat Mihalko (Utica)
- 2004: Anna Meyer (Hartwick)
- 2005: Megan McGuin (Utica)
- 2006: Jessica Reed (Stevens)
- 2007: Jomara Coghlan (Washington & Jefferson)
- 2008:

== Lacrosse ==
Alfred University, Elmira College, Hartwick College, Ithaca College, Nazareth College, Rochester Institute of Technology, St. John Fisher College, Stevens Institute of Technology, and Utica College compete in Empire 8 lacrosse. The men's and women's lacrosse championships were first held in 2002.

=== Men's ===
==== Champions ====
- 1999: Rochester Institute of Technology
- 2002: Ithaca College
- 2003: Nazareth College
- 2004: Nazareth College
- 2005: Nazareth College
- 2006: Rochester Institute of Technology
- 2007: Nazareth College
- 2008: Ithaca College
- 2009: Nazareth College
- 2010: Rochester Institute of Technology

==== Player of the Year ====
- 1999: Ben Hunt (RIT)
- 2000: Jake Coon (Nazareth)
- 2001: Eric Goodberlet (Nazareth)
- 2002: Ryan Martin (Ithaca)
- 2003: Matt Kent (Nazareth)
- 2004: Josh Molinari (RIT)
- 2005: Matt Casey (Ithaca)
- 2006: David Thering (RIT)
- 2007: Ryan Hotaling (Nazareth)
- 2008: Matt Nelligan (Ithaca)
- 2010: Mark DeCirce (Nazareth), Jordan MacIntosh (RIT)

=== Goalkeeper of the Year ===
- 2007: Dennis Butler (Ithaca)
- 2008: Dave Decker (Stevens)
- 2010: David Gal (Ithaca)

==== Rookie of the Year ====
- 1996: Ben Hunt (RIT)
- 2000: Dennis Juleff (Ithaca)
- 2001: Mark Colite (Hartwick)
- 2002: Brian Weil (Ithaca)
- 2003: Dave Thering (RIT)
- 2004: Dennis Butler (Ithaca), Andy German (Alfred)
- 2005: Andrew Ruocco (RIT)
- 2006: Mike Cintineo (Ithaca)
- 2007: Erinn O'Hara (Nazareth)
- 2008: Vito DeMola (Hartwick)
- 2010: Harry Hughes (Hartwick)

==== Coach of the Year ====
- 2000: Scott Nelson (Nazareth), Ken Long (Ithaca), Bart Governanti (Elmira)
- 2001: Rob Randall (Nazareth)
- 2002: Jeff Long (Ithaca)
- 2003: Rob Randall (Nazareth)
- 2004: Gene Peluso (RIT)
- 2005: Jeff Long (Ithaca)
- 2006: Jeff Long (Ithaca)
- 2007: Rob Randall (Nazareth)
- 2008: Jeff Long (Ithaca)
- 2010: Jake Coon (RIT)

=== Women's ===
==== Champions ====
- 2002: Nazareth College
- 2003: Ithaca College
- 2004: Ithaca College
- 2005: Nazareth College
- 2006: Nazareth College
- 2007: St. John Fisher College
- 2008: Ithaca College
- 2009: St. John Fisher College

==== Player of the Year ====
- 2000: Lauren D'Aurio (Alfred), Maya Lambiase (Nazareth)
- 2001: Brooke Andrews (Ithaca)
- 2002: Allison Roberts (Nazareth)
- 2003: Jessica Welch (Ithaca), Shawna Kabot (Nazareth)
- 2004: Michelle Schlegel (Ithaca)
- 2005: Katya Outwater (Elmira)
- 2006: Betsy Carney (Nazareth)
- 2007: Laurie Quackenbush (St. John Fisher)
- 2008: Laurie Quackenbush (St. John Fisher)

=== Goalkeeper of the Year ===
- 2007: Kelsey Evans (RIT)
- 2008: Kelsey Evans (RIT)

==== Rookie of the Year ====
- 2000: Lorra Podsiadlo (Nazareth)
- 2001: Michelle Schlegel (Ithaca)
- 2002: Lindsay Gotham (Nazareth)
- 2003: Kurstin Meehan (Ithaca)
- 2004: Theresa Nobilski (St. John Fisher)
- 2005: Meagan Howell (Ithaca)
- 2006: Jen Springett (St. John Fisher)
- 2007: Lauren Glavin (St. John Fisher)
- 2008: Tammy Kohanski (Utica)

==== Coach of the Year ====
- 2000: Sue Behme (Nazareth)
- 2001: Piep van Heuven (Ithaca)
- 2002: Sue Behme (Nazareth)
- 2003: Karen Hollands (Ithaca)
- 2004: Karen Hollands (Ithaca)
- 2005: Sue Behme (Nazareth)
- 2006: Sue Behme (Nazareth)
- 2007: Shannon McHale (St. John Fisher)
- 2008: Sue Behme (Nazareth)

== Swimming & diving ==
The men's and women's swimming & diving championships were first held in 2002.

=== Men's ===
==== Champions ====
- 2002: Ithaca College
- 2003: Alfred University
- 2004: Ithaca College
- 2005: Alfred University
- 2006: Hartwick College
- 2007: Alfred University
- 2008: Alfred University
- 2009: Alfred University
- 2010: Stevens Institute of Technology
- 2011: Ithaca College
- 2012: Ithaca College
- 2013: Stevens Institute of Technology
- 2014: Stevens Institute of Technology
- 2015: Stevens Institute of Technology
- 2016: Stevens Institute of Technology

==== Athlete of the Meet ====
- 2002: Sean Kavanaugh (Ithaca)
- 2003: Erik Zelbacher (RIT)
- 2004: Sean Kavanaugh (Ithaca), Sasha Kuznezov (Ithaca)
- 2005: Erik Zelbacher (RIT)
- 2006: Erik Zelbacher (RIT)
- 2007: Matt Baker (Alfred)
- 2008: Brian Agro (Alfred)
- 2009: Evan Wilson (Stevens)
- 2010: Andrew Brisson (Alfred)
- 2011: Dan Pecoraro (Stevens)
- 2012: Michael Phillips (Hartwick)
- 2013: John Hu (Stevens)
- 2014: Joshua Lefeber (Stevens)
- 2015: Joshua Lefeber (Stevens), Miles Blaney (Hartwick)
- 2016: Joshua Lefeber (Stevens), Matt Plunkett (Hartwick)

==== Athlete of the Year ====
- 2002: Sean Kavanaugh (Ithaca)
- 2003: Erik Zelbacher (RIT)
- 2004: Sean Kavanaugh (Ithaca), Sasha Kuznezov (Ithaca)
- 2005: Erik Zelbacher (RIT)
- 2006: Erik Zelbacher (RIT)
- 2007:
- 2008: Matt Baker (Alfred)
- 2009: Matt Baker (Alfred)
- 2010: Evan Wilson (Stevens)
- 2011: John Hu (Stevens)
- 2012: Alex Benham (Stevens)
- 2013: John Hu (Stevens)
- 2014: Adam Zelehowsky (Ithaca)
- 2015: Miles Blaney (Hartwick)
- 2016: Ravi Sun (Stevens)

==== Rookie of the Meet ====
- 2002: Steve Barnes (Ithaca)
- 2003: Brian Gotham (Alfred)
- 2004: Kurt Cedo (Hartwick)
- 2005: Quinn Donahoe (RIT)
- 2006: Kevin Milkovich (Hartwick)
- 2007: Andrew Brisson (Alfred)
- 2008: Joe Gage (Ithaca), Evan Wilson (Stevens)
- 2009: Antoine Conners (Ithaca)
- 2010: John Hu (Stevens)
- 2011: Taylor Van Cott (Ithaca)
- 2012: Miles Blaney (Hartwick)
- 2013:
- 2014:
- 2015:
- 2016: Vinny Tavoletti (Stevens)

==== Coach of the Year ====
- 2002: Kevin Markwardt (Ithaca)
- 2003: Brian Striker (Alfred)
- 2004: Kevin Markwardt (Ithaca)
- 2005: Brian Striker (Alfred)
- 2006: Dale Rothenberger (Hartwick)
- 2007: Brian Striker (Alfred)
- 2008: Brian Striker (Alfred)
- 2009: Brian Striker (Alfred)
- 2010: Trevor Miele (Stevens)
- 2011: Kevin Markwardt (Ithaca)
- 2012: Kevin Markwardt (Ithaca)
- 2013: Stevens Institute of Technology
- 2014: Kevin Markwardt (Ithaca)
- 2015: Stevens Institute of Technology
- 2016: Stevens Institute of Technology

=== Women's ===
==== Champions ====
- 2002: Ithaca College
- 2003: Ithaca College
- 2004: Ithaca College
- 2005: Ithaca College
- 2006: Ithaca College
- 2007: Ithaca College
- 2008: Ithaca College

==== Athlete of the meet ====
- 2002: Lisa Elsemore (Nazareth)
- 2003: Megan Hughes (Ithaca)
- 2004: Megan Hughes (Ithaca), Gayle Gregory (Hartwick)
- 2005: Aubrey Kirchoff (Nazareth)
- 2006: Emily Lesher (Nazareth)

==== Swimmer of the meet ====
- 2007: Emily Lesher (Nazareth)
- 2008: Emily Lesher (Nazareth)

==== Diver of the meet ====
- 2007: Erin Collins (Alfred)
- 2008: Ashley Brinkman (Hartwick)

==== Rookie of the meet ====
- 2002: Daniel Moreau (Hartwick)
- 2003: Stacey Bowen (Ithaca)
- 2004: Mary Larkin (Hartwick)
- 2005: Emily Lesher (Nazareth)
- 2006: Lauren Botterbusch (Ithaca)
- 2007: Caitlyn Burr (RIT)
- 2008: Sheila Rhoades (Ithaca)

==== Coach of the year ====
- 2002: TJ Davis (Alfred)
- 2003: Paula Miller (Ithaca)
- 2004: Dale Rothenberger (Hartwick)
- 2005: Martie Staser (Nazareth)
- 2006: Paula Miller (Ithaca)
- 2007: Martie Staser (Nazareth)
- 2008: Paula Miller (Ithaca)

== Tennis ==
Alfred University, Elmira College, Hartwick College, Ithaca College, Nazareth College, Rochester Institute of Technology, St. John Fisher College, Stevens Institute of Technology, and Utica College compete in Empire 8 tennis. The men's and women's tennis championships were first held in 2002.

=== Men's ===
==== Champions ====
- 2002: Rochester Institute of Technology
- 2003: Ithaca College
- 2004: Ithaca College
- 2005: Rochester Institute of Technology
- 2006: Ithaca College
- 2007: Ithaca College
- 2008: Stevens Institute of Technology
- 2009: Ithaca College
- 2010: Stevens Institute of Technology

==== Player of the Year ====
- 2002: Michael Magnone (Nazareth)
- 2003: Scott Rubens (Ithaca)
- 2004: Vladimir Vecher (Hartwick)
- 2005: David Chachu (RIT)
- 2006: Chris Ciolino (Ithaca)
- 2007: Colin Flynn (Ithaca)

==== Rookie of the Year ====
- 2002: David Chachu (RIT)
- 2003: Chris Ciolino (Ithaca)
- 2004: Colin Flynn (Ithaca)
- 2005: Aaron Haak (St. John Fisher)
- 2006: Ryan Weaver (Nazareth)
- 2007: Taylor Borda (Ithaca)

==== Coach of the Year ====
- 2002: Ann Nealon (RIT)
- 2003: Bill Austin (Ithaca)
- 2004: Andrea Pontius (Hartwick)
- 2005: Ann Nealon (RIT)
- 2006: Bill Austin (Ithaca)
- 2007: Bill Austin (Ithaca)

=== Women's ===
==== Champions ====
- 2002: Nazareth College
- 2003: Nazareth College
- 2004: Ithaca College
- 2005: Alfred University
- 2006: Ithaca College
- 2007: Ithaca College

==== Player of the Year ====
- 2001: Katie Silky (Nazareth)
- 2002: Sara Kula (RIT)
- 2003: Alicia Ballard (Alfred)
- 2004: Alicia Ballard (Alfred)
- 2005: Caitlin Castle (Ithaca)
- 2006: Katie Calfee (Alfred)
- 2007: Dana Bacalla (Stevens)

==== Rookie of the Year ====
- 2001: Alicia Ballard (Alfred)
- 2002: Jennifer Hume (RIT)
- 2003: Jody Butterfoss (Alfred)
- 2004: Katie Calfee (Alfred)
- 2005: Caitlin Castle (Ithaca)
- 2006: Caroline Caillet (RIT)
- 2007: Melanie Cohen (Ithaca)

==== Coach of the Year ====
- 2001: Brian Friedland (Alfred)
- 2002: Linda Gohagan (St. John Fisher)
- 2003: Annette Shapiro (Nazareth)
- 2004: Brian Friedland (Alfred)
- 2005: Bill Austin (Ithaca)
- 2006: Bill Austin (Ithaca)
- 2007: Bill Austin (Ithaca)

== Cross country ==
The men's and women's cross country championships were first held in 2003.

=== Men's ===
==== Champions ====
- 2003: Ithaca College
- 2004: Rochester Institute of Technology
- 2005: Rochester Institute of Technology
- 2006: Rochester Institute of Technology
- 2007: Rochester Institute of Technology

==== Runner of the Year ====
- 2003: Mike Styczynski (Ithaca)
- 2004: Shawn Calabrese (Ithaca)
- 2005: Nate Lowe (RIT)
- 2006: Jesse Williamson (RIT)
- 2007: Brendan Epstein (Nazareth)

==== Rookie of the Year ====
- 2003: Patrick McGreal (Ithaca)
- 2004: Brendan Epstein (Nazareth)
- 2005: Jared Burdick (RIT)
- 2006: Nick Stenuf (Nazareth)
- 2007: Mitch Boise (Utica)

==== Coach of the Year ====
- 2003: Jim Nichols (Ithaca)
- 2004: David Warth (RIT)
- 2005: David Warth (RIT)
- 2006: David Warth (RIT)
- 2007: David Warth (RIT)

=== Women's ===
==== Champions ====
- 2003: Ithaca College
- 2004: Ithaca College
- 2005: Ithaca College
- 2006: Ithaca College
- 2007: Ithaca College

==== Runner of the Year ====
- 2003: Amanda Laytham (Ithaca)
- 2004: Bridgette Pilling (Ithaca)
- 2005: Rachel Blasiak (Ithaca)
- 2006: Rachel Blasiak (Ithaca)
- 2007: Lindsey Nadolski (Ithaca)

==== Rookie of the Year ====
- 2003: Rachel Blasik (Ithaca)
- 2004: Adrienne Gagnier (RIT)
- 2005: Lindsey Nadolski (Ithaca)
- 2006: McKenzie Clemens (Alfred)
- 2007: Alissa Kersey (Ithaca)

==== Coach of the Year ====
- 2003: William Ware (Ithaca)
- 2004: William Ware (Ithaca)
- 2005: William Ware (Ithaca)
- 2006: William Ware (Ithaca)
- 2007: William Ware (Ithaca)

== Track ==
=== Indoor track ===
The men's and women's indoor track championships were first held in 2004.

==== Men's ====
===== Champions =====
- 2004: Ithaca College
- 2005: Rochester Institute of Technology
- 2006: Rochester Institute of Technology
- 2007: Rochester Institute of Technology
- 2008: Ithaca College

===== Athlete of the meet =====
- 2004: Kevin Alford (Ithaca), Curtis Howard (RIT)
- 2005: Matt Bango (RIT)
- 2006: Nick Stenuf (Nazareth)

===== Track Athlete of the meet =====
- 2007: Nate Lowe (RIT)
- 2008: Nick Stenuf (Nazareth)
- 2009: Michael Hardbarger AKA Ginnie (RIT)

===== Field Athlete of the meet =====
- 2007: Ryan Squillacioti (Alfred), Brandon Wheeler (Nazareth)
- 2008: Ryan Squillacioti (Alfred)

===== Rookie of the meet =====
- 2004: David Falcinelli (RIT)
- 2005: Jimmy Sorel (RIT)
- 2006: Jared Burdick (RIT), P.J. Scott (Ithaca)
- 2007: Dennis Akey (Ithaca)
- 2008: Jeff Wetmore (Ithaca)

===== Coach of the year =====
- 2004: Jim Nichols (Ithaca)
- 2005: David Warth (RIT)
- 2006: David Warth (RIT)
- 2007: David Warth (RIT)
- 2008: Jim Nichols (Ithaca)

==== Women's ====
===== Champions =====
- 2004: Ithaca College
- 2005: Ithaca College
- 2006: Ithaca College
- 2007: Rochester Institute of Technology
- 2008:

===== Athlete of the meet =====
- 2004: Amanda Laytham (Ithaca), Sheri Kelleher (Hartwick)
- 2005: Danielle Simmons (RIT)
- 2006: LaKeisha Perez (RIT)

===== Track Athlete of the meet =====
- 2007: LaKeisha Perez (RIT)
- 2008:

===== Field Athlete of the meet =====
- 2007: Jamie Morey (RIT)
- 2008:

===== Rookie of the meet =====
- 2004: Jessemyn Russell (Nazareth)
- 2005: LaKeisha Perez (RIT)
- 2006: Elizabeth Wilcox (Ithaca)
- 2007: Marcia McCord (Ithaca)
- 2008:

===== Coach of the year =====
- 2004: Jennifer Potter (Ithaca)
- 2005: Jennifer Potter (Ithaca)
- 2006: Jennifer Potter (Ithaca)

=== Outdoor track ===
The men's and women's outdoor track championships were first held in 2004.

==== Men's ====
===== Champions =====
- 2004: Ithaca College
- 2005: Ithaca College
- 2006: Rochester Institute of Technology

===== Athlete of the Meet =====
- 2004: Mike Styczynski (Ithaca), Tariq Ahmad (Ithaca)
- 2005: Jimmy Sorel (RIT)
- 2006: Nick Stenuf (Nazareth)

===== Rookie of the Meet =====
- 2004: Ken Taylor (Nazareth)
- 2005: Matt Bango (RIT)
- 2006: Drew Hodge (Ithaca)

===== Coach of the Year =====
- 2004: Jim Nichols (Ithaca)
- 2005: Jim Nichols (Ithaca)
- 2006: David Warth (RIT)

==== Women's ====
===== Champions =====
- 2004: Ithaca College
- 2005: Ithaca College
- 2006: Ithaca College

===== Athlete of the Meet =====
- 2004: Sheri Kelleher (Hartwick), Allison Griggs (RIT)
- 2005: Elena DeQuesada (Ithaca)
- 2006: Lauren Koppel (Ithaca), LaKeisha Perez (RIT)

===== Rookie of the Meet =====
- 2004: Stephanie Matuszewski (RIT)
- 2005: LaKeisha Perez (RIT)
- 2006: Lauren Koppel (Ithaca)

===== Coach of the Year =====
- 2004: Jennifer Potter (Ithaca)
- 2005: Jennifer Potter (Ithaca)
- 2006: Jennifer Potter (Ithaca)
