= Joe Bushman =

American football coach (born c. 1971)

Current position
- Title: Head coach
- Team: Casteel HS (AZ)
- Record: 0–0

Biographical details
- Born: c. 1971 (age 54–55); Portland, Oregon, U.S.
- Education: Willamette University (1993)

Playing career
- 1989: Lewis & Clark
- 1990–1992: Willamette
- Position: Quarterback

Coaching career (HC unless noted)
- 1998–2002: Central Catholic HS (OR)
- 2003–2004: Lakeridge HS (OR)
- 2005–2018: Clackamas HS (OR)
- 2019–2021: Lewis & Clark (OC)
- 2022–2024: Lewis & Clark
- 2025–present: Casteel HS (AZ)

Head coaching record
- Overall: 14–15 (college); 159–82 (high school)

Joseph Bushman (born c. 1971) is an American college football coach. He is the head football coach for Casteel High School, a position he has held since 2025.

Bushman was the head football coach for three different high schools before becoming the offensive coordinator for Lewis & Clark. In five seasons he led Central Catholic High School to a 42–14 record, in two seasons he led Lakeridge High School to a 13–8 record, and in fourteen seasons he led Clackamas High School to a 104–60 record. In 2017, he led Clackamas to an Oregon state championship. He was the head football coach for Lewis & Clark College from 2022 to 2024. In three seasons as head coach he has led the team to a 14–15 record. In 2023 he led the team to a 5–5 record which was the team's first non-losing season since 2011.

Bushman attended Benson High School. He played football, basketball, and baseball and lettered in all three sports. He played college football for Lewis & Clark and Willamette as a quarterback.

Bushman's son, Jake, played high school football under Bushman at Clackamas High School and attended Lewis & Clark while he was the head coach.

== Head coaching record ==
=== College ===
Year	Team	Overall	Conference	Standing	Bowl/playoffs
Lewis & Clark Pioneers (Northwest Conference) (2022–2024)
2022	Lewis & Clark	4–5	2–5	6th	
2023	Lewis & Clark	5–5	4–3	T–3rd	
2024	Lewis & Clark	5–5	4–3	4th	
Lewis & Clark:		14–15	10–11		
Total:		14–15			

=== High school ===
Year	Team	Overall	Conference	Standing	Bowl/playoffs
Central Catholic Rams () (1998–2002)
1998	Central Catholic	7–3			
1999	Central Catholic	9–3			
2000	Central Catholic	11–1			
2001	Central Catholic	5–5			
2002	Central Catholic	10–2			
Central Catholic:		42–14			
Lakeridge Pacers () (2003–2004)
2003	Lakeridge	7–4			
2004	Lakeridge	6–4	5–2	3rd	
Lakeridge:		13–8			
Clackamas Cavaleirs () (2005–2018)
2005	Clackamas	9–2	6–1	2nd	
2006	Clackamas	7–5	3–3	4th	
2007	Clackamas	8–4	4–2	3rd	
2008	Clackamas	4–5	3–3	4th	
2009	Clackamas	6–6	3–4	4th	
2010	Clackamas	0–10	0–5	6th	
2011	Clackamas	2–9	0–5	6th	
2012	Clackamas	5–6	2–3	5th	
2013	Clackamas	10–3	3–2	2nd	
2014	Clackamas	8–3	5–2	3rd	
2015	Clackamas	9–3	5–2	3rd	
2016	Clackamas	10–3	6–1	2nd	
2017	Clackamas	14–0	7–0	1st	
2018	Clackamas	12–1	3–0	1st	
Clackamas:		104–60	50–33		
Casteel Colts () (2025–present)
2025	Casteel	0–0	0–0		
Casteel:		0–0	0–0		
Total:		159–82			
National championship Conference title Conference division title or championship game berth
