= Matt Nardo =

American football coach

Current position
- Title: Head coach
- Team: Muskingum
- Conference: OAC
- Record: 4–6

Biographical details
- Born: Shadyside, Ohio, U.S.
- Education: Ohio University (2005); Muskingum University (2007)

Coaching career (HC unless noted)
- 2002–2004: Ohio (SA)
- 2005–2007: Muskingum (GA)
- 2008–2009: Bishop McLaughlin Catholic HS (FL) (DC)
- 2010: Bishop McLaughlin Catholic HS (FL)
- 2011–2012: Marietta (WR)
- 2013: Pikeville (DB)
- 2014: Emporia State (h-back/RC)
- 2015–2017: Emporia State (OC/IWR/h-back/RC)
- 2018: Basehor-Linwood HS (KS) (OL)
- 2019–2021: North Carolina Wesleyan (OC/WR)
- 2022–2024: Bluffton
- 2025–present: Muskingum

Head coaching record
- Overall: 13–27 (college); 7–3 (high school)

Matthew Nardo is an American college football coach. He is the head football coach for Muskingum University, a position he has held since 2025. He was the head football coach for Bishop McLaughlin Catholic High School in 2010 and Bluffton University from 2022 to 2024. He also coached for Ohio, Marietta, Pikeville, Emporia State, Basehor-Linwood High School, and North Carolina Wesleyan.

== Personal life ==
Nardo's brother, Bryan, is the safeties coach for the University of North Carolina at Charlotte.

== Head coaching record ==
=== College ===
Year	Team	Overall	Conference	Standing	Bowl/playoffs
Bluffton Beavers (Heartland Collegiate Athletic Conference) (2022–2024)
2022	Bluffton	2–8	2–5	6th	
2023	Bluffton	4–6	3–4	T–5th	
2024	Bluffton	3–7	3–3	4th	
Bluffton:		9–21	8–12		
Muskingum Fighting Muskies (Ohio Athletic Conference) (2025–present)
2025	Muskingum	4–6	4–4	5th	
2026	Muskingum	0–0	0–0		
Muskingum:		4–6	4–4		
Total:		13–27			

=== High school ===
Year	Team	Overall	Conference	Standing	Bowl/playoffs
Bishop McLaughlin Catholic Hurricanes () (2010)
2010	Bishop McLaughlin Catholic	7–3	4–2	3rd	
Bishop McLaughlin Catholic:		7–3	4–2		
Total:		7–3			
