= Joe Austin =

American football coach

Playing career
- 1996–1999: Concordia–St. Paul

Coaching career (HC unless noted)
- 2000–2003: Concordia–St. Paul (WR)
- 2004: Augsburg (OC)
- 2005–2007: Dubuque (OC)
- 2008–2011: Hanover
- 2012–2023: Southwestern (TX)

Head coaching record
- Overall: 53–89

Accomplishments and honors

Championships
- 1 SCAC (2016)

Awards
- SCAC Coach of the Year (2016)

Joe Austin is an American former college football coach and player. He was the head football coach at Southwestern University in Georgetown, Texas from 2013 to 2023. Austin served as the head football for Hanover College in Hanover, Indiana from 2008 to 2011.

== Head coaching record ==
| Year | Team | Overall | Conference | Standing | Bowl/playoffs |
|---|---|---|---|---|---|
Hanover Panthers (Heartland Collegiate Athletic Conference) (2008–2011)
| 2008 | Hanover | 2–7 | 2–5 | 7th | |
| 2009 | Hanover | 3–7 | 3–4 | T–5th | |
| 2010 | Hanover | 7–3 | 6–2 | 2nd | |
| 2011 | Hanover | 5–5 | 5–3 | T–2nd | |
| Hanover: | | 17–22 | 16–14 | | |
Southwestern Pirates (Southern Collegiate Athletic Conference) (2013–2016)
| 2013 | Southwestern | 0–10 | 0–3 | 4th | |
| 2014 | Southwestern | 1–8 | 0–3 | 4th | |
| 2015 | Southwestern | 2–8 | 0–3 | 4th | |
| 2016 | Southwestern | 7–3 | 6–0 | 1st | |
Southwestern Pirates (American Southwest Conference) (2017–2023)
| 2017 | Southwestern | 6–4 | 6–3 | T–3rd | |
| 2018 | Southwestern | 6–4 | 5–4 | T–5th | |
| 2019 | Southwestern | 4–6 | 3–6 | T–6th | |
| 2020–21 | Southwestern | 0–4 | 0–4 | 5th (East) | |
| 2021 | Southwestern | 4–6 | 4–5 | T–5th | |
| 2022 | Southwestern | 3–7 | 2–6 | 7th | |
| 2023 | Southwestern | 3–7 | 3–5 | T–5th | |
| Southwestern: | | 36–67 | 29–42 | | |
| Total: | | 53–89 | | | |
National championship Conference title Conference division title or championship game berth
