= Isaac Collins (American football) =

American football coach and player

Current position
- Title: Director of Athletics
- Team: Thiel

Biographical details
- Education: Rochester (1994)

Playing career
- 1990–1993: Rochester
- Position: Running back

Coaching career (HC unless noted)
- 1994–1997: Hobart (DC)
- 1998–1999: Columbia (assistant)
- 2000–2003: Lehigh (assistant/recruiting coordinator)
- 2004: Holy Cross (DC)
- 2005: Delaware (AHC/RC)
- 2006–2009: Citadel (DC)
- 2010–2012: Widener
- 2013–2018: Seton Hill
- 2019–2020: Bucknell (DB/ST)
- 2021: Bucknell (DC/DB)
- 2022–2024: Albright

Administrative career (AD unless noted)
- 2024–2025: Albright (dir. of admiss.)
- 2025–present: Thiel

Head coaching record
- Overall: 40–89
- Tournaments: 2–1 (NCAA D-III playoffs)

Accomplishments and honors

Championships
- 1 MAC (2012)

Isaac Collins is an American college football coach and former player. He was the head football coach for Albright College from 2022 to 2024. He was the defensive backs and special teams coach at Bucknell University, before being promoted to defensive coordinator prior to the 2021 spring season. Collins served as the head coach at Widener University in Chester, Pennsylvania from 2010 to 2012 and Seton Hill University in Greensburg, Pennsylvania from 2013 to 2018.

== Head coaching record ==
| Year | Team | Overall | Conference | Standing | Bowl/playoffs |
|---|---|---|---|---|---|
Widener Pride (Middle Atlantic Conference) (2010–2012)
| 2010 | Widener | 5–5 | 4–3 | T–4th | |
| 2011 | Widener | 9–2 | 6–2 | T–2nd | |
| 2012 | Widener | 11–1 | 8–0 | 1st | L NCAA Division III Quarterfinal |
| Widener: | | 25–8 | 18–5 | | |
Seton Hill Griffins (Pennsylvania State Athletic Conference) (2013–2018)
| 2013 | Seton Hill | 1–10 | 0–7 | 8th (West) | |
| 2014 | Seton Hill | 3–8 | 2–7 | T–6th (West) | |
| 2015 | Seton Hill | 3–8 | 2–5 | T–6th (West) | |
| 2016 | Seton Hill | 5–6 | 2–5 | 6th (West) | |
| 2017 | Seton Hill | 0–11 | 0–7 | 8th (West) | |
| 2018 | Seton Hill | 1–10 | 1–6 | 8th (West) | |
| Seton Hill: | | 13–53 | 7–37 | | |
Albright Lions (Middle Atlantic Conference) (2022–2024)
| 2022 | Albright | 0–10 | 0–8 | 11th | |
| 2023 | Albright | 0–10 | 0–9 | 10th | |
| 2024 | Albright | 2–8 | 1–8 | T–9th | |
| Albright: | | 2–28 | 1–25 | | |
| Total: | | 40–89 | | | |
National championship Conference title Conference division title or championship game berth
