= Carlton Hall =

American football coach (born c. 1975)

Current position
- Title: Co-defensive coordinator & defensive line coach
- Team: Augsburg
- Conference: MIAC

Biographical details
- Born: c. 1975 (age 50–51); Midwest City, Oklahoma, U.S.
- Education: Vanderbilt University (1998)

Playing career
- 1993–1997: Vanderbilt
- 1998: San Diego Chargers*
- Position: Linebacker

Coaching career (HC unless noted)
- 2003–2004: Columbia (WR)
- 2004: Tampa Bay Buccaneers (OQC)
- 2005: Columbia (DL)
- 2006 (spring): Columbia (LB)
- 2006: Georgetown (DL)
- 2007–2010: Harvard (DL)
- 2011–2012: Houston (DL)
- 2013: West Alabama (DL)
- 2014 (spring): Elon (DL)
- 2014: Yale (AHC/DL)
- 2015: Williams (DL)
- 2016: Northwestern Oklahoma State (DL)
- 2017–2019: Southern Oregon (LB)
- 2020–2021: Millikin (DC)
- 2022–2024: Millikin
- 2025–present: Augsburg (co-DC/DL)

Head coaching record
- Overall: 4–23

Accomplishments and honors

Awards
- All-SEC (1997)

Carlton L. Hall (born c. 1975) is an American football coach. He is the co-defensive coordinator and defensive line coach for Augsburg University, positions he has held since 2025. He was the head football coach for Millikin University from 2022 to 2024. He also coached for Columbia, Georgetown, Harvard, Houston, West Alabama, Elon, Yale, Williams, Northwestern Oklahoma State, Southern Oregon, and the Tampa Bay Buccaneers of the National Football League (NFL). He played college football for Vanderbilt as a linebacker and professionally for the San Diego Chargers of the NFL.

== Head coaching record ==
Year	Team	Overall	Conference	Standing	Bowl/playoffs
Millikin Big Blue (College Conference of Illinois and Wisconsin) (2022–2024)
2022	Millikin	4–6	3–6	T–7th	
2023	Millikin	0–10	0–9	10th	
2024	Millikin	0–7 (Note: Hall was fired with three games remaining in the season. Patrick Allgeier served as interim head coach for the remainder of the season.)	0–6		
Millikin:		4–23	3–21		
Total:		4–23			
