= Blaise Faggiano =

American football player and coach

Current position
- Title: Head coach
- Team: Utica
- Conference: Empire 8
- Record: 104–83

Playing career
- 1989–1992: Ithaca

Coaching career (HC unless noted)
- 1993–1994: Albany (GA)
- 1995–1996: Ithaca (DC)
- 1999–2007: St. John Fisher (DC)
- 2008–present: Utica

Head coaching record
- Overall: 104–83
- Bowls: 2–4
- Tournaments: 1–1 (NCAA D-III playoffs)

Blaise Faggiano is an American college football coach and former player. He is the head football coach for Utica University, a position he has held since 2008.

Faggiano graduated from Ithaca College and was a member of the football team. In 1991 they won the NCAA Division III Football Championship. After Ithaca, Faggiano became a graduate assistant coach at the University at Albany. He then returned to Ithaca in 1995 to coach football.

== Head coaching record ==
Year	Team	Overall	Conference	Standing	Bowl/playoffs	AFCA^{#}	D3^{°}
Utica Pioneers (Empire 8) (2008–present)
2008	Utica	3–7	2–4	5th			
2009	Utica	4–6	0–5	6th			
2010	Utica	5–5	0–5	5th			
2011	Utica	5–5	2–5	T–5th			
2012	Utica	6–4	4–3	T–3rd			
2013	Utica	3–7	1–6	7th			
2014	Utica	7–4	5–3	T–3rd	L North Central		
2015	Utica	4–6	3–5	T–6th			
2016	Utica	7–4	5–3	4th	L James Lynah		
2017	Utica	3–7	2–5	T–5th			
2018	Utica	7–4	4–3	T–3rd	W Robert M. "Scotty" Whitelaw		
2019	Utica	5–5	3–3	4th			
2020–21	Utica	1–1	1–1	T–1st			
2021	Utica	6–5	3–3	4th	L Robert M. "Scotty" Whitelaw		
2022	Utica	10–2	5–1	2nd	L NCAA Division III Second Round	22	20
2023	Utica	9–2	4–2	3rd	W Clayton Chapman		
2024	Utica	5–5	3–4	5th			
2025	Utica	8–3	6–1	2nd	L Asa S. Bushnell		
2026	Utica	6–1	3–1				
Utica:		104–83	56–63				
Total:		104–83					
