= Ted Soenksen =

American football coach (born c. 1983)

Current position
- Title: Offensive line coach
- Team: Mount Pisgah HS (GA)

Biographical details
- Born: c. 1983 (age 42–43); Vernon Hills, Illinois, U.S.
- Education: Lake Forest College (2006); Central Methodist University (2009)

Playing career
- 2002–2005: Lake Forest

Coaching career (HC unless noted)
- 2006: MacMurray (OL)
- 2007–2008: Central Methodist (RB)
- 2009–2011: Briar Cliff (TE/OL/assistant ST)
- 2012: Lake Forest (TE/OL)
- 2013–2015: Limestone (OL)
- 2016–2018: Lake Forest (OC/OL)
- 2019–2024: Beloit
- 2025–present: Mount Pisgah HS (GA) (OL)

Head coaching record
- Overall: 5–45

Ted Soenksen (born c. 1983) is an American college football coach. He is the offensive line coach for Mount Pisgah Christian School, a position he has held since 2025. He was the head football coach for Beloit College from 2019 to 2024. He also coached for MacMurray, Central Methodist, Briar Cliff, Lake Forest, and Limestone. He played college football for Lake Forest.

== Head coaching record ==
Year	Team	Overall	Conference	Standing	Bowl/playoffs
Beloit Buccaneers (Midwest Conference) (2019–2024)
2019	Beloit	1–9	1–4	5th (North)	
2020–21	No team—COVID-19				
2021	Beloit	0–10	0–9	10th	
2022	Beloit	1–9	1–8	9th	
2023	Beloit	2–8	1–8	9th	
2024	Beloit	1–9	1–8	T–9th	
Beloit:		5–45	4–37		
Total:		5–45			
