= Frank Colaprete =

American football coach

Current position
- Title: Athletic director & head coach
- Team: Cardinal Mooney HS (OH)
- Record: 10-3

Biographical details
- Born: Youngstown, Ohio, U.S.
- Education: John Carroll University (1996); Kent State University (1999)

Coaching career (HC unless noted)
- 1999–2000: Allegheny (assistant)
- 2001–2004: Johns Hopkins (DB)
- 2005–2006: Johns Hopkins (DC/LB)
- 2007–2009: Georgetown (DL)
- 2010–2012: Johns Hopkins (assoc. HC/DC)
- 2013–2024: Wooster
- 2025–present: Cardinal Mooney HS (OH)

Administrative career (AD unless noted)
- 2025–present: Cardinal Mooney HS (OH)

Head coaching record
- Overall: 53–57 (college); 10-3(high school)

Frank Colaprete is an American college football coach. He is the athletic director and head football coach for his alma mater, Cardinal Mooney High School, positions he has held since 2025. He was the head football coach for the College of Wooster from 2013 to 2024. He also coached for Allegheny, Johns Hopkins, and Georgetown.

== Head coaching record ==
=== College ===
Year	Team	Overall	Conference	Standing	Bowl/playoffs
Wooster Fighting Scots (North Coast Athletic Conference) (2013–2024)
2013	Wooster	7–3	7–2	3rd	
2014	Wooster	4–6	4–5	T–6th	
2015	Wooster	2–8	2–7	T–8th	
2016	Wooster	4–6	4–5	6th	
2017	Wooster	6–4	5–4	T–5th	
2018	Wooster	5–5	4–5	T–5th	
2019	Wooster	6–4	5–4	6th	
2020–21	No team—COVID-19				
2021	Wooster	6–4	5–4	6th	
2022	Wooster	6–4	4–4	T–5th	
2023	Wooster	4–6	3–5	6th	
2024	Wooster	3–7	2–6	7th	
Wooster:		53–57	45–51		
Total:		53–57			

=== High school ===
Year	Team	Overall	Conference	Standing	Bowl/playoffs
Cardinal Mooney Cardinals (Independent) (2025–present)
2025	Cardinal Mooney	10–2	0–0		
Cardinal Mooney:		0–0	0–0		
Total:		0–0			
