= Paul Vosburgh =

American football coach (born c. 1953)

Biographical details
- Born: c. 1953 (age 72–73); Lockport, New York, U.S.
- Education: William Penn College (1975)

Playing career
- 1971–1974: William Penn
- Position: Linebacker

Coaching career (HC unless noted)
- 1975?–1977: Pittsburg State (GA)
- 1978–1982: DeSales Catholic HS (NY)
- 1983–1984: William Penn (DC)
- 1985–1987: William Penn
- 1988–1990: Emporia State (DC)
- 1991–2024: St. John Fisher

Administrative career (AD unless noted)
- 1978–1982: DeSales Catholic HS (NY)

Head coaching record
- Overall: 199–175 (college)
- Bowls: 6–2
- Tournaments: 10–5 (NCAA D-III playoffs)

Accomplishments and honors

Championships
- 6 Empire 8 (2004, 2006, 2007, 2009, 2014, 2015)

Paul Vosburgh is an American former college football coach. He was the head football coach for DeSales Catholic High School—now known as Niagara Catholic High School—from 1978 to 1982, William Penn College—now known as William Penn University—from 1985 to 1987, and St. John Fisher College from 1991 to 2024.

== Head coaching record ==
=== College ===
Year	Team	Overall	Conference	Standing	Bowl/playoffs
William Penn Statesmen (Iowa Intercollegiate Athletic Conference) (1985–1987)
1985	William Penn	4–6	2–5	T–5th	
1986	William Penn	3–6	3–5	6th	
1987	William Penn	4–6	3–5	T–6th	
William Penn:		11–18	8–15		
St. John Fisher Cardinals (NCAA Division III independent) (1991–2001)
1991	St. John Fisher	0–9			
1992	St. John Fisher	4–6			
1993	St. John Fisher	5–4			
1994	St. John Fisher	5–4			
1995	St. John Fisher	7–3			
1996	St. John Fisher	2–7			
1997	St. John Fisher	1–8			
1998	St. John Fisher	3–6			
1999	St. John Fisher	1–8			
2000	St. John Fisher	1–9			
2001	St. John Fisher	3–7			
St. John Fisher Cardinals (Empire 8) (2002–2024)
2002	St. John Fisher	6–4	2–2	3rd	
2003	St. John Fisher	8–3	3–1	2nd	
2004	St. John Fisher	10–2	5–1	T–1st	L NCAA Division III Second Round
2005	St. John Fisher	8–3	4–2	3rd	W ECAC Northwest Bowl
2006	St. John Fisher	12–2	5–1	T–1st	L NCAA Division III Semifinal
2007	St. John Fisher	11–2	5–1	T–1st	L NCAA Division III Quarterfinal
2008	St. John Fisher	7–4	4–2	T–2nd	W ECAC Northeast Bowl
2009	St. John Fisher	7–3	4–1	T–1st	W ECAC Northeast Bowl
2010	St. John Fisher	9–2	3–2	T–2nd	W ECAC Northeast Bowl
2011	St. John Fisher	10–3	6–1	2nd	L NCAA Division III Quarterfinal
2012	St. John Fisher	8–3	4–3	T–3rd	W ECAC Northeast Bowl
2013	St. John Fisher	10–3	5–2	T–2nd	L NCAA Division III Quarterfinal
2014	St. John Fisher	9–2	6–2	T–1st	W ECAC Bowl
2015	St. John Fisher	7–4	6–2	T–1st	W ECAC Lynah Bowl
2016	St. John Fisher	8–3	6–2	T–2nd	L ECAC Bushnell Bowl
2017	St. John Fisher	2–8	2–5	T–5th	
2018	St. John Fisher	3–6	3–4	6th	
2019	St. John Fisher	5–5	2–4	T–5th	
2020–21	No team—COVID-19				
2021	St. John Fisher	4–6	2–4	5th	
2022	St. John Fisher	4–6	2–4	5th	
2023	St. John Fisher	5–5	2–4	T–4th	
2024	St. John Fisher	3–7	2–5	6th	
St. John Fisher:		188–157	83–55		
Total:		199–175			
National championship Conference title Conference division title or championship game berth
