= Mike Leonard (American football) =

American football coach (born 1967)

Current position
- Title: Head coach
- Team: Franklin (IN)
- Conference: HCAC
- Record: 134–60

Biographical details
- Born: December 27, 1967 (age 58)
- Education: Hanover College (1984); DePauw University (1986)

Playing career

Football
- 1980–1983: Hanover
- Position: Quarterback

Coaching career (HC unless noted)

Football
- 1984–1985: DePauw (GA)
- 1986: Alabama (GA)
- 1987–1990: Hanover (OC)
- 1991: Holy Cross (WR)
- 1992: Butler (QB)
- 1993–1995: Recruit Seagulls (OC)
- 1996–1997: Wittenberg (OC)
- 1998: Recruit Seagulls (OC)
- 1999–2002: Hanover (OC)
- 2003–2019: Franklin (IN)
- 2025–present: Franklin (IN)

Track and field
- 1987–1990: Hanover

Tennis
- 1987–1990: Hanover

Flag football
- 2020–2024: Franklin Community HS (IN)

Head coaching record
- Overall: 134–60 (football)
- Tournaments: 5–9 (NCAA D-III playoffs)

Accomplishments and honors

Championships
- 11 HCAC (2007–2008, 2010–2018)

Michael Leonard (born December 27, 1967) is an American football coach. He is the head football coach for Franklin College, a position he has held since 2025 and from 2003 to 2019. He also coached for DePauw, Alabama, Hanover, Holy Cross, Butler, Wittenberg, and the Recruit Seagulls of the X-League. He played college football for Hanover as a quarterback.

== Head coaching record ==
=== Football ===
Year	Team	Overall	Conference	Standing	Bowl/playoffs	D3^{#}
Franklin Grizzlies (Heartland Collegiate Athletic Conference) (2003–2019)
2003	Franklin	2–8	2–4	5th		
2004	Franklin	5–5	3–3	T–3rd		
2005	Franklin	5–5	3–3	T–3rd		
2006	Franklin	9–1	6–1	2nd		
2007	Franklin	9–2	7–0	1st	L NCAA Division III First Round	18
2008	Franklin	11–2	7–0	1st	L NCAA Division III Quarterfinal	8
2009	Franklin	7–3	5–2	T–2nd		
2010	Franklin	9–2	8–0	1st	L NCAA Division III First Round	22
2011	Franklin	10–2	8–0	1st	L NCAA Division III Second Round	15
2012	Franklin	9–3	8–0	1st	L NCAA Division III Second Round	20
2013	Franklin	8–4	7–1	T–1st	L NCAA Division III Second Round	19
2014	Franklin	8–3	8–0	1st	L NCAA Division III First Round	
2015	Franklin	8–3	8–0	1st	L NCAA Division III First Round	
2016	Franklin	8–2	7–1	T–1st		
2017	Franklin	8–3	8–0	1st	L NCAA Division III First Round	24
2018	Franklin	8–2	7–1	T–1st		
2019	Franklin	5–5	4–3	4th		
Franklin Grizzlies (Heartland Collegiate Athletic Conference) (2025–present)
2025	Franklin	5–5	3–3	T–3rd		
2026	Franklin	0–0	0–0			
Franklin:		134–60	109–22			
Total:		134–60				
National championship Conference title Conference division title or championship game berth
