= Casey Goff =

American football coach (born c. 1979)

Current position
- Title: Head coach
- Team: Saint Vincent
- Conference: PAC
- Record: 2–8

Biographical details
- Born: c. 1979 (age 46–47); Montrose, Pennsylvania, U.S.
- Education: Susquehanna University (2001)

Playing career
- 1997–1999: Susquehanna
- Positions: Linebacker, defensive lineman

Coaching career (HC unless noted)
- 2000: Susquehanna (LB)
- 2001: Muhlenberg (DL)
- 2002–2003: Emmaus HS (PA) (DL)
- 2004: Mansfield (LB)
- 2005: Cortland (DL/assistant S&C)
- 2006: Rhodes (DL)
- 2007: Washington & Jefferson (ST/DL)
- 2008: Washington & Jefferson (co-DC/S&C)
- 2009: Washington & Jefferson (co-DC/DL/S&C)
- 2010–2012: King's (PA) (DC/LB)
- 2013–2014: Salve Regina (DC)
- 2015: Defiance (DC)
- 2016: Defiance
- 2017–2023: TCNJ
- 2024: Brooke HS (WV)
- 2025–present: Saint Vincent

Head coaching record
- Overall: 27–51 (college); 3–7 (high school)

Casey Goff (born c. 1979) is an American college football coach. He is the head football coach for Saint Vincent College, a position he has held since 2025. He was the head football coach for Defiance College in 2016, The College of New Jersey from 2017 to 2023, and Brooke High School in 2024. He also coached for Susquehanna, Muhlenberg, Mansfield, Cortland, Rhodes, Washington & Jefferson, King's (PA), and Salve Regina. He played college football for Susquehanna as a linebacker and defensive lineman.

== Head coaching record ==
=== College ===
| Year | Team | Overall | Conference | Standing | Bowl/playoffs |
|---|---|---|---|---|---|
Defiance Yellow Jackets (Heartland Collegiate Athletic Conference) (2016)
| 2016 | Defiance | 5–5 | 4–4 | T–5th | |
| Defiance: | | 5–5 | 4–4 | | |
TCNJ Lions (New Jersey Athletic Conference) (2017–2023)
| 2017 | TCNJ | 4–6 | 4–5 | T–5th | |
| 2018 | TCNJ | 3–7 | 3–6 | 7th | |
| 2019 | TCNJ | 2–8 | 2–5 | T–5th | |
| 2020–21 | No team—COVID-19 | | | | |
| 2021 | TCNJ | 3–6 | 2–4 | T–4th | |
| 2022 | TCNJ | 3–6 | 2–4 | T–4th | |
| 2023 | TCNJ | 5–5 | 3–3 | 5th | |
| TCNJ: | | 20–38 | 16–27 | | |
Saint Vincent Bearcats (Presidents' Athletic Conference) (2025–present)
| 2025 | Saint Vincent | 2–8 | 1–7 | T–9th | |
| 2026 | Saint Vincent | 0–0 | 0–0 | | |
| Saint Vincent: | | 2–8 | 1–7 | | |
| Total: | | 27–51 | | | |

=== High school ===
| Year | Team | Overall | Conference | Standing | Bowl/playoffs |
|---|---|---|---|---|---|
Brooke Bruins () (2024)
| 2024 | Brooke | 3–7 | 1–0 | 2nd | |
| Brooke: | | 3–7 | 1–0 | | |
| Total: | | 3–7 | | | |
