= Shaun Weaver =

American football coach (born c. 1980)

Current position
- Title: Head coach
- Team: Albright
- Conference: MAC
- Record: 4–6

Biographical details
- Born: c. 1980 (age 45–46)
- Education: Wilmington College (2002); Bemidji State University (2006)

Playing career
- 1998–2001: Wilmington (OH)

Coaching career (HC unless noted)
- 2002: Wilmington (OH) (DL)
- 2003–2004: Bemidji State (DL)
- 2006: Gettysburg (DL/S&C)
- 2007–2019: Gettysburg (DC/DL/S&C)
- 2020–2021: Albright (ST/DL/RC)
- 2022–2023: Albright (DC/DL)
- 2024: Frostburg State (DL/RC)
- 2025–present: Albright

Head coaching record
- Overall: 4–6

Shaun Weaver (born c. 1980) is an American college football coach. He is the head football coach for Albright College, a position he has held since 2025. He also coached for Wilmington (OH), Bemidji State, Gettysburg, and Frostburg State. He played college football for Wilmington (OH).

== Head coaching record ==
Year	Team	Overall	Conference	Standing	Bowl/playoffs
Albright Lions (Middle Atlantic Conference) (2025–present)
2025	Albright	4–6	3–6	T–7th	
2026	Albright	0–0	0–0		
Albright:		4–6	3–6		
Total:		4–6			
