= Ed Raby Jr. =

American football coach (born c. 1990)

Current position
- Title: Head coach
- Team: St. John Fisher
- Conference: Empire 8
- Record: 12–6

Biographical details
- Born: c. 1991 (age 34–35); Reed City, Michigan, U.S.
- Education: Alma College (2012); Alfred University (2014)

Playing career
- 2009–2012: Alma
- Position: Defensive lineman

Coaching career (HC unless noted)
- 2013: Alfred (TE/DL)
- 2014: Allegheny (DL)
- 2015: Allegheny (LB)
- 2016: Allegheny (ST/DL)
- 2017 (spring): Allegheny (OL)
- 2017–2019: Morrisville (DC/S)
- 2020–2024: Morrisville
- 2025–present: St. John Fisher

Head coaching record
- Overall: 32–28
- Bowls: 1–2

Edward W. Raby Jr. (born c. 1991) is an American college football coach. He is the head football coach for St. John Fisher University, a position he has held since 2025. He previously served as the head football coach for the State University of New York at Morrisville from 2020 to 2024. He also coached for Alfred and Allegheny. He played college football for Alma as a defensive lineman.

== Head coaching record ==
Year	Team	Overall	Conference	Standing	Bowl/playoffs
Morrisville Mustangs (Empire 8) (2020–2024)
2020–21	No team—COVID-19				
2021	Morrisville	2–8	0–5	7th	
2022	Morrisville	7–4	3–3	4th	L Robert M. "Scotty" Whitelaw
2023	Morrisville	4–6	2–4	T–4th	
2024	Morrisville	7–4	5–2	T–2nd	W Robert M. "Scotty" Whitelaw
Morrisville:		20–22	10–14		
St. John Fisher Cardinals (Empire 8) (2025–present)
2025	St. John Fisher	7–4	5–2	3rd	L Clayton Chapman
2026	St. John Fisher	5–2	2–2		
St. John Fisher:		12–6	7–4		
Total:		32–28			
