= Matt Bremer =

American football coach (born c. 1986)

Current position
- Title: Head coach
- Team: St. Scholastica
- Conference: MIAC
- Record: 3–14

Biographical details
- Born: c. 1986 (age 39–40)
- Education: Crown College (2008)

Playing career

Football
- 2004–2007: Crown

Basketball
- 2000s: Crown
- Position: Quarterback (football)

Coaching career (HC unless noted)

Football
- 2008: Willamette (assistant WR)
- 2010–2011: St. Scholastica (WR)
- 2012–2013: St. Scholastica (WR/RC)
- 2014: St. Scholastica (DB/RC)
- 2015: St. Scholastica (co-STC/DB/RC)
- 2016–2018: Crown (OC/QB)
- 2019: Minnesota Duluth (OLB)
- 2020–2022: St. Scholastica (OC)
- 2023–2024: St. Scholastica (AHC/OC)
- 2025–present: St. Scholastica

Head coaching record
- Overall: 3–14

Matthew Bremer (born c. 1986) is an American college football coach. He is the head football coach for the College of St. Scholastica, a position he has held since 2025. He also coached for Willamette, Crown, Minnesota Duluth, and had an 11-year stint as an assistant for St. Scholastica. He played college football and basketball for Crown.

== Playing career and education ==
Bremer attended Crown College, where he was a quarterback for the football team and also played basketball.

During Bremer's football career, he appeared in 35 games and threw for 40 touchdowns and rushed for 25 more. During his senior season, he threw for 1,863 yards and 18 touchdowns, while also rushing for 747 yards and 12 touchdowns. He was a three-time All-UMAC selection.

Bremer graduated from Crown in 2008 with a degree in sport management and biblical studies.

== Coaching career ==
In 2008, Bremer began his coaching career after graduating as an assistant wide receivers coach for Willamette. In 2010, he was hired as the wide receivers coach for St. Scholastica. In 2012, he added the role of recruiting coordinator before transitioning from wide receivers coach to defensive backs coach in 2014. In the following year, he added the role of co-special teams coordinator. During his stint with the school, Bremer helped lead the team to five NCAA Division III tournament appearances.

After six seasons with St. Scholastica, Bremer returned to his alma mater, Crown, as the offensive coordinator and quarterbacks coach. As offensive coordinator, he transitioned the team from a power offense to a pro-style offense. He remained there for three seasons before being hired as the outside linebackers coach and assistant special teams coordinator for Minnesota Duluth.

In 2020, Bremer began his second stint with St. Scholastica, this time as the offensive coordinator. In 2023, he was promoted to assistant head coach. In 2025, after 11 total seasons with the school, he was promoted once again to head football coach, taking over for Mike Heffernan, who resigned after seven seasons.

Upon accepting the role, Bremer said:

"I am thrilled to continue the work that has already been done to build and grow Saints Football...In my time at St. Scholastica, our program has always been one of service. I look forward to continuing to serve our players, alumni, staff, and the College of St. Scholastica community in this role."

St. Scholastica's athletic director Jessica Cherry noted:

"Today marks the beginning of a new era for our football program! I am beyond excited to welcome our new head coach, Matthew Bremer, a proven leader who will inspire greatness both on and off the field. Coach Bremer embodies the Saints' passion, vision, commitment to excellence, and a winning mentality. Get ready for a thrilling ride!"

Bremer took over for Heffernan after a 4–6 season in 2024, where the team finished with a conference record of 2–5 in the Minnesota Intercollegiate Athletic Conference (MIAC).

== Personal life ==
While coaching at St. Scholastica, Bremer lived in Duluth, Minnesota. He and his wife, Stephanie, have two children.

== Head coaching record ==
Year	Team	Overall	Conference	Standing	Bowl/playoffs
St. Scholastica Saints (Minnesota Intercollegiate Athletic Conference) (2025–present)
2025	St. Scholastica	3–7	2–7	T–8th	
2026	St. Scholastica	0–7	0–6		
St. Scholastica:		3–14	2–13		
Total:		3–14			
