= Xavier Dupree =

American football coach (born 1997)

Current position
- Title: Head coach
- Team: Hiram
- Conference: PAC
- Record: 3–7

Biographical details
- Born: January 10, 1997 (age 29); Decatur, Georgia, U.S.
- Education: Middle Tennessee State University (2019)

Playing career
- 2016–2018: Middle Tennessee
- Position: Wide receiver

Coaching career (HC unless noted)
- 2019 (spring): Middle Tennessee (SA)
- 2019: South Carolina (intern)
- 2020–2022: Hiram (WR/S&C)
- 2023–2024: Catawba (WR)
- 2025–present: Hiram

Head coaching record
- Overall: 3–7

Xavier Michael Dupree (born January 10, 1997) is an American college football coach. He is the head football coach for Hiram College, a position he has held since 2025. He also coached for Middle Tennessee, South Carolina, and Catawba. He played college football for Middle Tennessee as a wide receiver.

== Head coaching record ==
Year	Team	Overall	Conference	Standing	Bowl/playoffs
Hiram Terriers (Presidents' Athletic Conference) (2025–present)
2025	Hiram	3–7	2–6		
2026	Hiram	0–0	0–0		
Hiram:		3–7	2–6		
Total:		3–7			
