= Rose–Hulman Fightin' Engineers =

Collegiate sports teams in Indiana, U.S.

Rose-Hulman Fightin' Engineers
- University: Rose–Hulman Institute of Technology
- Nickname: Fightin' Engineers
- NCAA: Division III
- Conference: Heartland Collegiate Athletic Conference
- Athletic director: Ayanna Tweedy
- Location: Terre Haute, Indiana
- Varsity teams: 20 (10 men's and 10 women's)
- Football stadium: Cook Stadium
- Basketball arena: Hulbert Arena
- Baseball stadium: Art Nehf Field
- Colors: Old rose and white
- Mascot: Rosie the Elephant
- Website: athletics.rose-hulman.edu

The Rose–Hulman Fightin' Engineers are the athletics teams for Rose–Hulman Institute of Technology, located in Terre Haute, Indiana, United States. The Fightin' Engineers athletic program is a member of the Heartland Collegiate Athletic Conference and competes at the NCAA Division III level.

== History ==
Rose–Hulman currently competes in the Heartland Collegiate Athletic Conference (HCAC), an NCAA Division III athletic conference. It was previously a member of the Southern Collegiate Athletic Conference (SCAC) and Indiana Collegiate Athletic Conference (ICAC), the latter now known as the Heartland Collegiate Athletic Conference. Despite no longer sharing a conference affiliation with the SCAC, Rose–Hulman has always had a rivalry with DePauw University, and has consistently had nonleague rivalries with other nearby strong academic schools such as Washington University in St. Louis, University of Chicago, and Denison University.

The men and women's swimming and diving team previously had an affiliation with the College Conference of Illinois and Wisconsin (CCIW) but now participates in the HCAC. The colors of the Rose–Hulman Fightin' Engineers are rose and white, and their mascot is Rosie the Elephant.

As of 2021, Rose–Hulman has had a student athlete named to an NCAA Division III Academic All-America Team for 36 consecutive years. One hundred forty two Academic All-Americans have been named from the school.

Rose–Hulman won the Commissioner's Cup from the HCAC eight times over the decade from 2008 to 2018. This award is given to the school with the most points based on the teams performance in the conference.

== Sports sponsored ==
=== Football ===
The Rose–Hulman football program was started in 1882. That year, Rose (then known as Rose Polytechnic Institute) played one game against Wabash College which they lost 12–0. In the early years, Rose played the likes of the University of Notre Dame, Purdue University, University of Illinois, Indiana University, and Indiana State Normal School.

Jeff Sokol has led the Rose-Hulman football team since 2011. During his tenure, he has led the Fightin' Engineers to three Heartland Collegiate Athletic Conference Championships (2013, 2016, and 2021) and five runner-up finishes (2011, 2015, 2017, 2019, 2020, 2022). Sokol owns a career record of 63–33 (56–20 in the HCAC) as of the 2020 season.

=== Baseball ===
Baseball first made an appearance at Rose–Hulman in 1888. Since then, the baseball team has been a mainstay on the Rose–Hulman campus except for the stretch of time between 1929 and 1947 when Rose–Hulman could not field a team. In 2008, the team received a bid to the NCAA Division III Mideastern Regional Tournament which was held at Art Nehf Field on the campus of Rose–Hulman. The regional tournament has also been held on Rose–Hulman's campus in 2005 and 2006. The team also won the HCAC Conference Tournament, receiving an automatic bid to the NCAA Division III Mideastern Regional Tournament. In 2008, 2009, and 2010 the Engineers won their first game, all started by Derek Eitel, before losing the following two to be eliminated from the tournament.

=== Soccer ===
The women's soccer team was the 2007 HCAC champions and made an appearance in the NCAA Division III Tournament in the same season. They repeated at the regular season conference champions in 2009. They also have record of 98–45–6 since. The men's soccer team was the best team in the HCAC regular season in 2008 and 2009 and second in 2006 and 2007, making the program's first ever appearance in the NCAA Division III National Soccer Tournament in 2008. They also have a record of 53–21–7 between 2006 and 2009.

=== Swimming ===
The Rose–Hulman Institute of Technology swimming and diving program has earned regional respect and achieved national accomplishments during the past decade. Rose–Hulman's swimming and diving resume features one national champion, six All-American awards and 64 all-conference awards since 1998. The men's squad finished either third or fourth in the nationally competitive Southern Collegiate Athletic Conference for eight consecutive years, while the women improved from seventh to fourth in the 2005 campaign. The accomplishments include 17 provisional national qualification times, 11 conference champions and four individual swimmers competing at the NCAA Division III National Championships.

Rose–Hulman's ascent to national prominence began in 1999, when Sean Valentine captured the first two All-American awards in school history. Valentine placed fourth in the 50-yard (46 m) freestyle and sixth in the 100-yard (91 m) breaststroke at the NCAA Division III Nationals. Matt Smith became Rose–Hulman's first swimming national champion in 2003. Smith's career included four All-American honors, highlighted by a first place in the 100-yard (91 m) breaststroke in 2003. He captured eight individual league championships, including three 100-yard (91 m) breaststroke titles. David Breiding, a 2004 graduate, also qualified for the NCAA Division III National Championships during a career that featured nine individual all-conference awards. Adam Effinger continued the tradition with a pair of honorable mention All-American efforts at the 2006 NCAA Division III National Championships.

The women's swimming and diving team earned its first significant regional and national accolades in 2005. The 200-yard (180 m) medley relay team of Jessica Frank, Anita Isch, Elaine Kratz and Erin O’Connor earned the first national provisional qualification in the history of the women's program and captured all-conference honors. The all-conference accolades continued with two individual and one relay award in 2006.

In 2013 the Fightin' Engineers set 20 school records at the CCIW Championships and had 15 provisional and automatic NCAA Division III National Qualifiers, sending two to the National Championships, John Huster and Orion Martin.

The men's swimming and diving team won the College Conference of Illinois and Wisconsin in 2015 and again in 2016. The Fightin' Engineers have been coached by Keith Crawford since 2008.

=== Track and field ===
Members of the Rose-Hulman Track and Field team have captured ten national titles, five of which were awarded to 2013 graduate Liz Evans in the high jump. The men's program has consecutively won the HCAC title from 2008 to 2018, and the women's program won the HCAC title in 2011 and 2018. Recent individual successes include two-time National Champion and 1998 graduate pole vaulter Ryan Loftus, 2007 graduate pole vaulter Ryan Schipper, who placed third in the 2007 NCAA Outdoor Championships, and 2012 graduate Sutton Coleman, who earned 7 All American Honors in 4 different track events.

2013 graduate Liz Evans has become Rose Hulman's most decorated athlete with 8 All American Honors, 5 National Championship titles, 6 HCAC Field Athlete of the Year awards, and 5 USTFCCCA Great Lakes Regional Field Athlete of the Year honors. Evans also earned two bachelor's degrees in mathematics and electrical engineering and a master's degree in engineering management. Evans finished fifth at the 2020 U.S. Olympic Trials while posting a personal best jump of 1.90 meters (6' 2 3/4").

1978 graduate Tony Allen Cooksey was a four-time NCAA division III track All-American. He achieved the following finishes at the NCAA division III championships: 2nd in long jump-1975, 4th in triple jump-1976, 2nd in triple jump-1977, 5th in decathlon-1978. He competed at the 1980 and '84 Olympic Trials in decathlon.

=== Rifle ===
Until 2016, Rose Hulman featured a nationally ranked NCAA rifle program that competed against teams in all three NCAA divisions and was a member of the Western Intercollegiate Rifle Conference. The team recorded a first-place finish among NCAA Division III rifle teams in 2014 and saw two of its coaches (Kenny Hitt and James Mills) earn coach of the year honors. The rifle program was discontinued during the 2015–2016 academic year due to "logistics issues;" President James Conwell issued a subsequent statement asserting that recent NCAA policy changes caused the team to become "[an ineffective] use of our resources and efforts."

== Facilities ==
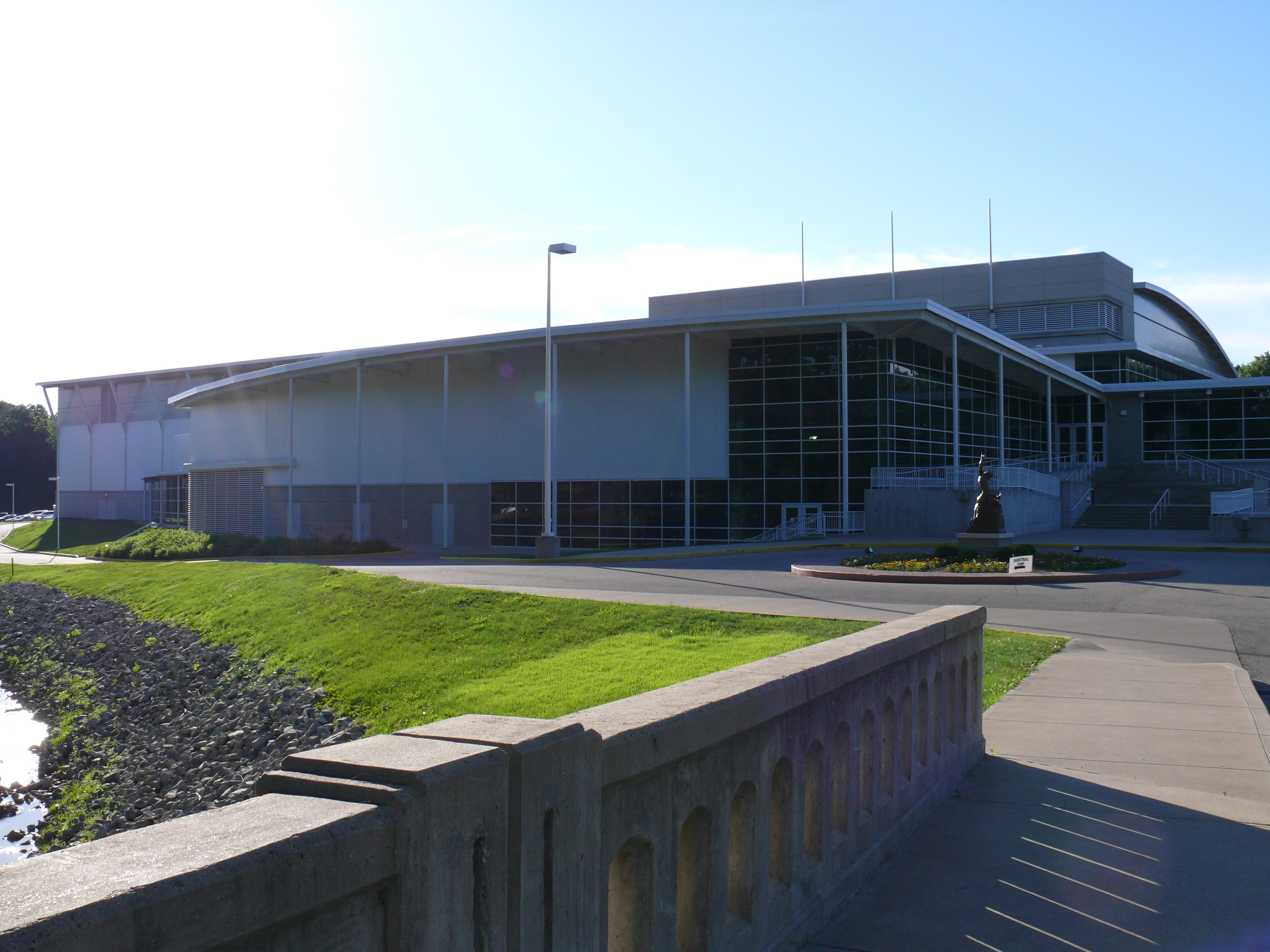
Sports and Recreation Center, home to several sports at Rose–Hulman

There are many facilities for sports events. The Sports and Recreation Center (SRC) is home to basketball courts, racquetball courts, an indoor track, an 8-lane, 25-yard (23 m) swimming and diving pool, a weight-lifting room, a basketball arena (Hulbert Arena), and a multi-use room (for dance, wrestling, etc.). Outside of the SRC is Cook Stadium and its football field surrounded by the William Welch Outdoor Track & Field Complex. Inside of Cook Stadium grandstand is the RHIT rifle range. Adjacent to the football field is a series of tennis courts as well as two intramural fields (used by the Indianapolis Colts during their summer training camp) near these courts. Rose–Hulman's sports facilities also include the Art Nehf baseball field, a softball field, and the Jim Rendel soccer field.

In 2007 and 2009, the SRC was home to the Division III Men's and Women's Indoor National Track Championships, after having previously hosted the Division III Women's Basketball National Championships in 2002 and 2003.
