= Casteel High School =

Public school in Queen Creek, Arizona, US

- Home of the Colts

Location
- 24901 S. Power Road; Queen Creek, Arizona 85142; United States; 33.222163°N 111.683804°W

Information
- Type: Public high school
- Opened: 2015
- Locale: Suburban, Large (21)
- School district: Chandler Unified School District
- NCES District ID: 0401870
- CEEB code: 030821
- NCES School ID: 040187003483
- Principal: Jay Schnittger
- Faculty: 135.20
- Teaching staff: 146.40 (FTE)
- Grades: 7–12
- Enrollment: 2,971 (2023–2024)
  - Grade 7: 430
  - Grade 8: 423
  - Grade 9: 473
  - Grade 10: 499
  - Grade 11: 513
  - Grade 12: 478
- Student to teacher ratio: 20.29
- Colors: Navy and gold
- Mascot: Colts
- Website: cchs.cusd80.com

Casteel High School is a junior high and high school in Queen Creek, Arizona.

== History ==
Casteel is the fifth high school built by the Chandler Unified School District. Opening in July 2015 school was named for Camille Casteel who served as superintendent of the district for 50 years. The CUSD governing board changed its policy about naming schools after current staff specifically wished to name the school after Casteel.

== Academics ==
Casteel's curriculum is aligned with the standards set by the Arizona Department of Education and implements the state's Education and Career Action Plan (ECAP) required for all students grades 9–12 graduating from a publicly funded high school. CUSD high schools also implements an open enrollment policy, meaning students from outside the intended school boundaries may attend without tuition or other penalties.

Arizona requires that all high school students take 6 credit bearing courses during their freshmen through junior years, and provides the option for students on track for graduation the ability to reduce their course load to 4 credit bearing courses. However, CUSD requires all students must complete 22 credits whereas the public university system controlled by the Arizona Board of Regents requires only 16 credits in the following areas:

- English - 4 credits
- Mathematics - 4 credits
- Science - 3 credits
- Social Studies. - 3 credits
- Career and Technical Educator/Fine Arts - 1 credit
- Physical Education - 1 credit
- Comprehensive Health - 1/2 credits
- Elective Courses - 5 1/2 credits

=== Cross-credit courses ===
At Casteel and all CUSD high school students may swap two semesters (1/2 credits per semester) of Spiritline, Beginning through Advance Dance, Drill Team, Color Guard, Marching Band, Winter guard, or AFJROTC essentially waiving the required one Physical Education credit required for graduation.

Students which choose applied sciences in areas such as Applied Biology or Applied Agricultural Sciences gain equivalent Science credits. Likewise, Economics credits can be awarded like Agricultural Business Management, Business, Business Applications, Marketing, Economics Applications, Family and Consumer Sciences, and vocational courses.

Community college credits can be awarded through a partnership with Chandler-Gilbert Community College (CGCC) and cooperative credits for vocational courses are provided by East Valley Institute of Technology (EVIT). Students must be dually enrolled for the Arizona community college or the Arizona public university system to accept the credits towards a degree. CUSD Transportation Department provides routes between Casteel, EVIT, and CGCC with after school hours transportation intended for students participating in activities.

Separate from EVIT and CGCC, the University of Arizona implemented a pilot program to get university credits for students pursuing introductory engineering courses starting in 2014.

== Athletics ==
Casteel is an Arizona Interscholastic Association (AIA) member school offering boys and girls sports adhering to Chandler Unified School District (CUSD) Title IX compliance. Student athletes can participate in varsity, junior varsity, and freshmen only teams as well as individual sports under the AIA's 6A Conference. Casteel Athletics consist of these sports:

- Badminton (Girls)‡
- Baseball
- Basketball (Boys and Girls)
- Beach Volleyball (Boys and Girls)‡
- Cheer (Girls and Coed)
- Cross Country (Boys and Girls)†
- Flag football
- Football
- Golf (Boys and Girls)†
- Hockey
- Lacrosse (Boys and Girls)
- Pomline
- Soccer (Boys and Girls)
- Softball
- Swim and Dive (Boys and Girls)†
- Tennis (Boys and Girls)‡
- Track and field (Boys and Girls)†
- Volleyball (Boys and Girls)‡
- Wrestling (Boys and Girls)
- † denotes individual and team sports
- ‡ denotes individual, doubles, and team sports

Each sport is funded by the school, yet additional funds are raised through boosters creating 501(c)(3) non-profit organization, donations, and tax credits.
