= Mark Carr =

American football coach (born c. 1967)

Biographical details
- Born: c. 1967 (age 58–59); Vestal, New York, U.S.
- Education: University of New Hampshire (1990)

Playing career
- 1985–1989: New Hampshire
- Position: Quarterback

Coaching career (HC unless noted)
- 1991–1992: New Hampshire (QB)
- 1993–1997: Hartwick (OC)
- 1998–2001: Hartwick (AHC/OC)
- 2002–2024: Hartwick

Head coaching record
- Overall: 71–137
- Tournaments: 0–1 (NCAA D-III playoffs)

Accomplishments and honors

Championships
- 1 Empire 8 (2007)

Mark Carr (born c. 1967) is an American former college football coach. He was the head football coach for Hartwick College from 2002 to 2024. He also coached for New Hampshire. He played college football for New Hampshire as a quarterback.

== Head coaching record ==
Year	Team	Overall	Conference	Standing	Bowl/playoffs
Hartwick Hawks (Empire 8 Athletic Conference) (2002–2024)
2002	Hartwick	8–2	3–1	2nd	
2003	Hartwick	2–7	1–3	4th	
2004	Hartwick	1–8	0–6	7th	
2005	Hartwick	4–6	0–6	7th	
2006	Hartwick	4–6	2–4	5th	
2007	Hartwick	8–3	5–1	T–1st	L NCAA Division III First Round
2008	Hartwick	7–3	4–2	T–2nd	
2009	Hartwick	5–5	1–4	5th	
2011	Hartwick	2–8	0–7	8th	
2012	Hartwick	3–7	0–7	8th	
2013	Hartwick	6–4	3–4	T–5th	
2014	Hartwick	2–8	1–7	9th	
2015	Hartwick	4–6	2–6	T–8th	
2016	Hartwick	2–8	1–7	8th	
2017	Hartwick	3–7	2–5	T–5th	
2018	Hartwick	2–8	0–7	8th	
2019	Hartwick	1–9	0–6	7th	
2020–21	No team—COVID-19				
2021	Hartwick	2–7	1–5	6th	
2022	Hartwick	2–8	0–6	7th	
2023	Hartwick	1–9	0–6	7th	
2024	Hartwick	2–8	1–6	7th	
Hartwick:		71–137	27–106		
Total:		71–137			
National championship Conference title Conference division title or championship game berth
