= Heartland Collegiate Athletic Conference =

Intercollegiate athletic conference

- Association: NCAA
- Founded: 1987 (as Indiana Collegiate Athletic Conference)
- Commissioner: Jay Jones (since 2019)
- Sports fielded: 18; men's: 9; women's: 9
- Division: Division III
- No. of teams: 10 (9 in 2027)
- Headquarters: Carmel, Indiana
- Region: Ohio Valley
- Website: heartlandconf.org

Locations
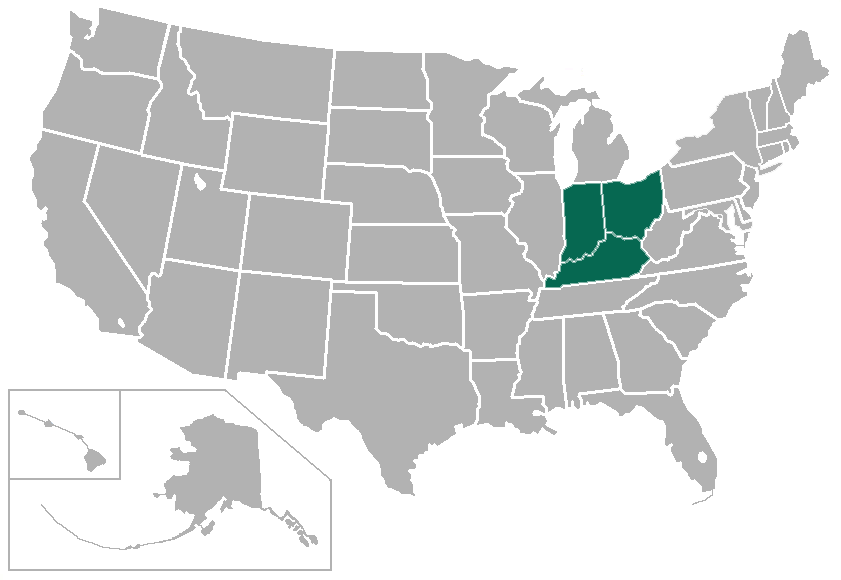

The Heartland Collegiate Athletic Conference (HCAC) is an intercollegiate athletic conference affiliated with the NCAA's Division III. Member institutions are located in Indiana, Kentucky and Ohio. Founded as the Indiana Collegiate Athletic Conference (ICAC) in 1987, it reincorporated under its current name in 1998 with the addition of several schools from Ohio.

Original members of the HCAC included Anderson, Bluffton, Franklin, Hanover, Manchester, Mount St. Joseph, Wabash, and Wilmington. Of the ten current members, six were founding members of the former ICAC.

Former members include DePauw (1987–1998), Taylor (1988–1991), Wabash (1987–1999), Wilmington (1998–2000), and Defiance (2000–2024). Rose–Hulman Institute of Technology (1988–1998) re-joined as of July 1, 2006.

== History ==
The Indiana Collegiate Athletic Conference (ICAC) was formed in June 1987, with 1990–91 being the first full season of competition (all eight teams competing in eight varsity sports).

Charter members in 1987 included Anderson University, DePauw University, Franklin College, Hanover College, Manchester College, and Wabash College. Rose-Hulman Institute of Technology and Taylor University later joined in 1988. Taylor left the conference after the 1990–91 season.

The addition of three Ohio schools (Bluffton College, the College of Mount St. Joseph, and Wilmington College) and the departure of two Indiana schools (DePauw and Rose-Hulman) during the 1998–99 season prompted a change in name to Heartland Collegiate Athletic Conference. Wabash and Wilmington later departed in the 1998–99 and 1999–2000 seasons respectively. Defiance College and Transylvania University joined in 2000 and 2001 respectively. Rose-Hulman re-joined the HCAC, effective for the 2006–07 season.

In October 2009, Earlham College of Richmond, Indiana was accepted as the 10th member of the conference and began competition in the fall of 2010.

In the summer of 2024, Defiance College departed the HCAC to join the NAIA and the Wolverine–Hoosier Athletic Conference. Berea College joined the HCAC at the start of the 2024–25 academic year.

=== Chronological timeline ===
Heartland Collegiate Athletic Conference
Location of member schools: full, departing
- 1987 – In June 1987, the HCAC was founded as the Indiana Collegiate Athletic Conference (ICAC). Charter members included Anderson College (now Anderson University), DePauw University, Franklin College, Hanover College, Manchester College, and Wabash College, beginning the 1987–88 academic year.
- 1988 – Rose–Hulman Institute of Technology and Taylor University joined the ICAC in the 1988–89 academic year.
- 1990 – The ICAC began their first full season on competition, competing in eight varsity sports, beginning the 1990–91 academic year.
- 1991 – Taylor left the ICAC to join the National Association of Intercollegiate Athletics (NAIA) after the 1990–91 academic year.
- 1998:
  - DePauw and Rose–Hulman (or Rose–Hulman Tech or RHIT) left the ICAC to join the Southern Collegiate Athletic Conference (SCAC) after the 1997–98 academic year.
  - Bluffton College (now Bluffton University), the College of Mount St. Joseph (now Mount St. Joseph University) and Wilmington College joined the ICAC in the 1998–99 academic year.
  - The ICAC rebranded as the Heartland Collegiate Athletic Conference (HCAC), beginning the 1998–99 academic year.
- 1999 – Wabash left the HCAC to join the North Coast Athletic Conference (NCAC) after the 1998–99 academic year. Its football program later left after the 1999 fall season (1999–2000 school year).
- 2000:
  - Wilmington left the HCAC to join the Ohio Athletic Conference (OAC) after the 1999–2000 academic year.
  - Defiance College joined the HCAC in the 2000–01 academic year.
- 2001 – Transylvania University joined the HCAC in the 2001–02 academic year.
- 2006 – Rose–Hulman rejoined the HCAC in the 2006–07 academic year.
- 2010 – Earlham College joined the HCAC in the 2010–11 academic year.
- 2021 – Centenary College of Louisiana, Colorado College, the University of Dallas, Southwestern University of Texas and Spalding University joined the HCAC as affiliate members for men's lacrosse in the 2022 spring season (2021–22 academic year), although Spalding would also add women's lacrosse into its HCAC affiliate membership that same year; however, lacrosse has not been fully incorporated into the HCAC multi-sport conference, thus corresponding into a separate single-sport league known as the Heartland Collegiate Lacrosse Conference (HCLC), which came to existence since the 2017–18 school year.
- 2022 – Dallas left the HCAC as an affiliate member for men's lacrosse (within the HCLC) after the 2022 spring season (2021–22 academic year).
- 2023 – Centenary (La.), Colorado College and Southwestern (Tex.) left the HCAC as affiliate members for men's lacrosse (within the HCLC) after the 2023 spring season (2022–23 academic year).
- 2024:
  - Defiance left the HCAC to join the NAIA and the Wolverine–Hoosier Athletic Conference (WHAC) after the 2023–24 academic year.
  - Berea College joined the HCAC at the start of the 2024–25 academic year.
- 2027 – Manchester will leave the HCAC to join the Crossroads League of the NAIA at the end of the 2026–27 academic year.

== Member schools ==
=== Current members ===
The HCAC currently has ten full members, all private schools:

Institution	Location	Founded	Affiliation	Enrollment	Nickname	Joined (Note: Represents the calendar year when fall sports competition begins.)	Colors	Football
Anderson University	Anderson, Indiana	1917	Church of God	1,228	Ravens	1987	Orange and Black	Yes
Berea College	Berea, Kentucky	1855	Christian (unaffiliated)	1,527	Mountaineers	2024	Berea Blue and White	No
Bluffton University	Bluffton, Ohio	1899	Mennonite	646	Beavers	1998	Purple and White	Yes
Earlham College	Richmond, Indiana	1847	Quaker	753	Quakers	2010	Maroon and White	No
Franklin College	Franklin, Indiana	1834	Baptist	985	Grizzlies	1987	Navy Blue and Old Gold	Yes
Hanover College	Hanover, Indiana	1827	Presbyterian	1,243	Panthers	1987	Red and Blue	Yes
Manchester University	North Manchester, Indiana	1860	Church of the Brethren	1,276	Spartans	1987	Black and Gold	Yes
Mount St. Joseph University	Delhi Township, Ohio (Note: Mailing address is located in Cincinnati.)	1920	Catholic (S.C.C.)	2,265	Lions	1998	Blue and Gold	Yes
Rose–Hulman Institute of Technology	Terre Haute, Indiana	1874	Nonsectarian	2,334	Fightin' Engineers	1988; 2006 (Note: Rose–Hulman left the HCAC after the 1997–98 school year, before rejoining in the 2006–07 school year.)	Old Rose and White	Yes
Transylvania University	Lexington, Kentucky	1780	Disciples of Christ	1,006	Pioneers	2001	Crimson and White	No

=== Affiliate members ===
The HCAC currently has four affiliate members, three private schools and one public school:

Institution	Location	Founded	Affiliation	Enrollment	Nickname	Joined (Note: Represents the calendar year when fall sports competition begins.)	HCAC sport(s)	Primary conference
Alfred State College	Alfred, New York	1908	Public (Note: Part of the State University of New York system)	3,781	Pioneers	2025	Men's lacrosse (Note: Lacrosse is not fully incorporated into the HCAC multi-sport conference, thus creating a separate single-sport league known as the Heartland Collegiate Lacrosse Conference.)	Allegheny Mountain (AMCC)
Hilbert College	Hamburg, New York	1957	Catholic (Franciscan)	968	Hawks	2025	Men's lacrosse	Allegheny Mountain (AMCC)
La Roche University	McCandless, Pennsylvania (Note: The campus mailing address is Pittsburgh.)	1963	Catholic (C.D.P.)	2,153	Redhawks	2025	Men's lacrosse	Allegheny Mountain (AMCC)
Spalding University	Louisville, Kentucky	1814	Catholic (S.C.N.)	1,553	Golden Eagles	2021^{m.lax.}	Men's lacrosse	St. Louis (SLIAC)
Spalding University	Louisville, Kentucky	1814	Catholic (S.C.N.)	1,553	Golden Eagles	2021^{w.lax.}	Women's lacrosse	St. Louis (SLIAC)

=== Former members ===
The HCAC has five former full members, all were private schools:

Institution	Location	Founded	Affiliation	Nickname	Joined (Note: Represents the calendar year when fall sports competition begins.)	Left (Note: Represents the calendar year when spring sports competition ends.)	Current conference
Defiance College	Defiance, Ohio	1850	United Church of Christ	Yellow Jackets	2000	2024	Wolverine–Hoosier (WHAC) (Note: Currently an NAIA athletic conference.)
DePauw University	Greencastle, Indiana	1837	United Methodist	Tigers	1987	1998	North Coast (NCAC)
Taylor University	Upland, Indiana	1846	Interdenominational	Trojans	1988	1991	Crossroads
Wabash College (Note: Wabash is a men's only institution, therefore it does not sponsor women's sports.)	Crawfordsville, Indiana	1832	Nonsectarian	Little Giants	1987	1999 (Note: Wabash left the HCAC for all sports after the 1998–99 school year except for football (which later followed suit at the end of the 1999 fall season [1999–2000 school year]).)	North Coast (NCAC)
Wilmington College	Wilmington, Ohio	1870	Quakers	Quakers	1998	2000	Ohio (OAC)

=== Former affiliate members ===
The HCAC had four former affiliate members, all were private schools:

Institution	Location	Founded	Affiliation	Nickname	Joined (Note: Represents the calendar year when fall sports competition begins.)	Left (Note: Represents the calendar year when spring sports competition ends.)	HCAC sport(s)	Primary conference
Centenary College of Louisiana	Shreveport, Louisiana	1825	United Methodist	Gentlemen & Ladies	2021	2023	Men's lacrosse (Note: Lacrosse is not fully incorporated into the HCAC multi-sport conference, thus creating a separate single-sport league known as the Heartland Collegiate Lacrosse Conference.)	Southern (SCAC)
Colorado College	Colorado Springs, Colorado	1874	Nonsectarian	Tigers	2021	2023	Men's lacrosse	Southern (SCAC)
University of Dallas	Irving, Texas	1956	Catholic	Crusaders	2021	2022	Men's lacrosse	Southern (SCAC)
Southwestern University	Georgetown, Texas	1840	United Methodist	Pirates	2021	2023	Men's lacrosse	Southern (SCAC)

=== Membership timeline ===
Full member (all sports) Full member (non-football) Associate member (football) Associate member (sport)

== Sports ==
Conference sports

Sport	Men's	Women's
Baseball	✓	
Basketball	✓	✓
Cross Country	✓	✓
Football	✓	
Golf	✓	✓
Soccer	✓	✓
Softball		✓
Swimming & Diving	✓	✓
Tennis	✓	✓
Track & Field (Indoor)	✓	✓
Track & Field (Outdoor)	✓	✓
Volleyball		✓

=== Men's sponsored sports by school ===
School	Baseball	Basketball	Cross Country	Football	Golf	Soccer	Swimming & Diving	Tennis	Track & Field (Indoor)	Track & Field (Outdoor)	Total HCAC sports
Anderson	✓	✓	✓	✓	✓	✓	✓	✓	✓	✓	10
Berea	✓	✓	✓	✗	✓	✓	✗	✓	✓	✓	8
Bluffton	✓	✓	✓	✓	✓	✓	✗	✗	✓	✓	8
Earlham	✓	✓	✓	✗	✓	✓	✗	✓	✓	✓	8
Franklin	✓	✓	✓	✓	✓	✓	✓	✓	✓	✓	10
Hanover	✓	✓	✓	✓	✓	✓	✗	✓	✓	✓	9
Manchester	✓	✓	✓	✓	✗	✓	✓	✓	✓	✓	9
Mount St. Joseph	✓	✓	✓	✓	✓	✓	✗	✗	✓	✓	8
Rose–Hulman	✓	✓	✓	✓	✓	✓	✓	✓	✓	✓	10
Transylvania	✓	✓	✓	✗	✓	✓	✓	✓	✓	✓	9
Totals	10	10	10	7	9	10	5	8	10	10	89

==== Men's varsity sports not sponsored by the HCAC that are played by HCAC schools ====
School	Lacrosse	Volleyball	Wrestling
Franklin		MCVL	
Hanover	HCLC		
Manchester			IND
Mount St. Joseph		MCVL	IND
Transylvania	HCLC		

=== Women's sponsored sports by school ===
School	Basketball	Cross Country	Golf	Soccer	Softball	Swimming & Diving	Tennis	Track & Field (Indoor)	Track & Field (Outdoor)	Volleyball	Total HCAC sports
Anderson	✓	✓	✓	✓	✓	✓	✓	✓	✓	✓	10
Berea	✓	✓	✗	✓	✓	✗	✓	✓	✓	✓	8
Bluffton	✓	✓	✓	✓	✓	✗	✗	✓	✓	✓	8
Earlham	✓	✓	✓	✓	✓	✗	✓	✓	✓	✓	9
Franklin	✓	✓	✓	✓	✓	✓	✓	✓	✓	✓	10
Hanover	✓	✓	✓	✓	✓	✗	✓	✓	✓	✓	9
Manchester	✓	✓	✗	✓	✓	✓	✓	✓	✓	✓	9
Mount St. Joseph	✓	✓	✓	✓	✓	✗	✗	✓	✓	✓	8
Rose–Hulman	✓	✓	✓	✓	✓	✓	✓	✓	✓	✓	10
Transylvania	✓	✓	✓	✓	✓	✓	✓	✓	✓	✓	10
Totals	10	10	8	10	10	5	8	10	10	10	91

==== Women's varsity sports not sponsored by the HCAC that are played by HCAC schools ====
School	Field Hockey	Lacrosse	Wrestling (Note: De facto Division I sport through the 2026–27 school year, with the NCAA championship open to members of all divisions. A Division III championship will be established in 2027–28.)
Franklin		HCLC	
Hanover		HCLC	
Manchester			IND
Mount St. Joseph			IND
Transylvania	NCAC	HCLC	
