= Dan Gritti =

American football coach

Biographical details
- Education: Vanderbilt (1995); Wisconsin (JD, 1998)

Coaching career (HC unless noted)
- 1994–1997: Vanderbilt (SA)
- 2003–2004: Indiana (GA)
- 2005–2008: Middlebury (ST/DL)
- 2009–2010: Chicago (ST)
- 2011–2015: Rhodes
- 2016–2021: Millikin
- 2022: Rice (assistant)
- 2023–2024: Rice (sr. off. assistant)

Head coaching record
- Overall: 56–45

Accomplishments and honors

Championships
- 1 SAA (2013)

Dan Gritti is an American college football coach. He served as the head football coach at Rhodes College in Memphis, Tennessee from 2011 to 2015 and Millikin University in Decatur, Illinois from 2016 to 2021.

Grittin holds a Juris Doctor degree from the University of Wisconsin and an undergraduate degree from Vanderbilt University.

== Head coaching record ==
Year	Team	Overall	Conference	Standing	Bowl/playoffs
Rhodes Lynx (Southern Collegiate Athletic Conference) (2011)
2011	Rhodes	3–6	1–5	6th	
Rhodes Lynx (Southern Athletic Association) (2012–2015)
2012	Rhodes	6–3	2–2	3rd	
2013	Rhodes	8–2	5–1	T–1st	
2014	Rhodes	8–2	5–1	2nd	
2015	Rhodes	4–6	2–6	T–7th	
Rhodes:		29–19	10–14		
Millikin Big Blue (College Conference of Illinois and Wisconsin) (2016–2021)
2016	Millikin	4–6	3–5	6th	
2017	Millikin	7–3	5–3	T–4h	
2018	Millikin	6–4	5–4	5th	
2019	Millikin	5–5	4–5	T–6th	
2020–21	Millikin	2–1	2–1	T–2nd	
2021	Millikin	3–7	3–6	T–6th	
Millikin:		27–26	22–24		
Total:		56–45			
National championship Conference title Conference division title or championship game berth
