= Tony Kunczewski =

American football coach (born c. 1978)

Current position
- Title: Head coach
- Team: Berry
- Conference: SAA
- Record: 93–39

Biographical details
- Born: c. 1978 (age 47–48); Harrison City, Pennsylvania, U.S.
- Education: Grove City College (2000); California University of Pennsylvania (2004)

Playing career
- 1996–1999: Grove City
- Positions: Strong safety, outside linebacker

Coaching career (HC unless noted)
- 2000: Allegheny (GA)
- 2001–2002: Allegheny (OLB)
- 2003: Allegheny (co-ST/S&C)
- 2004: Bowdoin (DB)
- 2005–2012: LaGrange (DC/S&C)
- 2013–present: Berry

Head coaching record
- Overall: 93–39
- Tournaments: 4–5 (NCAA D-III playoffs)

Accomplishments and honors

Championships
- 7 SAA (2016–2020, 2024, 2025)

Awards
- 2× First Team-PAC (1998–1999); 5× SAA Coach of the Year (2016–2018, 2020, 2023)

Tony Kunczewski (born c. 1978) is an American college football coach. He is the head football coach for Berry College, a position he has held since the program's inception in 2013. He previously coached for Allegheny, Bowdoin, and LaGrange. He played college football for Grove City as a strong safety and outside linebacker.

== Head coaching record ==
Year	Team	Overall	Conference	Standing	Bowl/playoffs	D3^{#}	AFCA^{°}
Berry Vikings (Southern Athletic Association) (2013–present)
2013	Berry	0–9	0–6	7th			
2014	Berry	2–8	1–5	T–6th			
2015	Berry	7–3	6–2	T–2nd			
2016	Berry	9–1	7–1	T–1st			
2017	Berry	11–1	8–0	1st	L NCAA Division III Second Round	15	
2018	Berry	10–2	7–1	T–1st	L NCAA Division III Second Round	17	
2019	Berry	9–2	7–1	T–1st	L NCAA Division III First Round		
2020–21	Berry	4–0	4–0	1st			
2021	Berry	6–4	4–3	4th			
2022	Berry	7–3	5–2	T–2nd			
2023	Berry	9–1	7–1	2nd		23	
2024	Berry	8–3	6–1	T–1st	L NCAA Division III First Round		
2025	Berry	11–2	7–0	1st	L NCAA Division III Quarterfinal	9	9
2026	Berry	0–0	0–0				
Berry:		93–39	69–23				
Total:		93–39					
National championship Conference title Conference division title or championship game berth
