= 2018 NCAA Division III football rankings =

- Season: 2018
- Postseason: Single-elimination
- Preseason No. 1: Mount Union
- National champions: Mary Hardin–Baylor
- Conference with most teams in final poll: CCIW, MIAC (3)

Two human polls and a committee's selections comprise the 2018 National Collegiate Athletic Association (NCAA) Division III football rankings. Unlike in Division I's Football Bowl Subdivision (FBS), the NCAA, Division III college football's governing body, bestows a national championship on the winner of the Stagg Bowl – the championship round of a 32-team postseason tournament. The main weekly poll that begins in the preseason is the D3football.com poll, which ranks the top 25 colleges in Division III football. The AFCA Division III Coaches Poll is released beginning midway through the season.

== Legend ==
	Increase in ranking
	Decrease in ranking
	Not ranked previous week
	Selected for Division III Football Championship Playoffs
(#–#)	Win–loss record
(Italics)	Number of first place votes
т	Tied with team above or below also with this symbol

== D3football.com poll ==
	Preseason July 12	Week 1 September 2	Week 2 September 9	Week 3 September 16	Week 4 September 23	Week 5 September 30	Week 6 October 7	Week 7 October 14	Week 8 October 21	Week 9 October 28	Week 10 November 4	Week 11 November 11	Final December 15	
1.	Mount Union (24)	Mount Union (1–0) (24)	Mount Union (1–0) (24)	Mount Union (2–0) (24)	Mount Union (3–0) (23)	Mount Union (4–0) (22)	Mount Union (5–0) (19)	Mount Union (6–0) (19)	Mount Union (7–0) (20)	Mount Union (8–0) (20)	Mount Union (9–0) (20)	Mount Union (10–0) (20)	Mary Hardin–Baylor (15–0) (25)	1.
2.	Mary Hardin–Baylor (1)	Mary Hardin–Baylor (0–0) (1)	Mary Hardin–Baylor (1–0) (1)	Mary Hardin–Baylor (2–0) (1)	Mary Hardin–Baylor (3–0) (2)	Mary Hardin–Baylor (4–0) (3)	Mary Hardin–Baylor (5–0) (6)	Mary Hardin–Baylor (6–0) (6)	Mary Hardin–Baylor (7–0) (5)	Mary Hardin–Baylor (8–0) (5)	Mary Hardin–Baylor (9–0) (5)	Mary Hardin–Baylor (10–0) (5)	Mount Union (14–1)	2.
3.	St. Thomas (MN)	St. Thomas (MN) (1–0)	St. Thomas (MN) (1–0)	St. Thomas (MN) (2–0)	St. Thomas (MN) (3–0)	St. Thomas (MN) (4–0)	St. Thomas (MN) (5–0)	Brockport (6–0)	Brockport (7–0)	Brockport (8–0)	Brockport (9–0)	Saint John's (MN) (10–0)	Saint John's (MN) (12–1)	3.
4.	Wisconsin–Oshkosh	Wisconsin–Oshkosh (1–0)	Brockport (2–0)	Brockport (3–0)	Brockport (3–0)	Brockport (4–0)	Brockport (5–0)	Frostburg State (5–0)	Saint John's (MN) (7–0)	Saint John's (MN) (8–0)	Saint John's (MN) (9–0)	Brockport (10–0)	Wisconsin–Whitewater (12–1)	4.
5.	Linfield	Brockport (1–0)	North Central (IL) (1–0)	North Central (IL) (2–0)	North Central (IL) (3–0)	Frostburg State (3–0)	Frostburg State (4–0)	Saint John's (MN) (6–0)	Wisconsin–Whitewater (6–0)	Wisconsin–Whitewater (7–0)	Wisconsin–Whitewater (8–0)	Wisconsin–Whitewater (9–0)	Johns Hopkins (12–2)	5.
6.	Brockport	Linfield (0–0)	Frostburg State (2–0)	Frostburg State (2–0)	Frostburg State (3–0)	Wesley (4–0)	Wisconsin–Whitewater (4–0)	Wisconsin–Whitewater (5–0)	Frostburg State (6–0)	Frostburg State (7–0)	Frostburg State (8–0)	Frostburg State (9–0)	Hardin–Simmons (9–2)	6.
7.	North Central (IL)	North Central (IL) (0–0)	Wesley (1–0)	Wesley (2–0)	Wesley (3–0)	Hardin–Simmons (4–0)	Wesley (4–1)	St. Thomas (MN) (5–1)	St. Thomas (MN) (6–1)	St. Thomas (MN) (7–1)	Hardin–Simmons (8–1)	Hardin–Simmons (9–1)	Bethel (MN) (11–2)	7.
8.	Frostburg State	Frostburg State (1–0)	Hardin–Simmons (1–0)	Hardin–Simmons (2–0)	Hardin–Simmons (3–0)	Wisconsin–Whitewater (3–0)	Saint John's (MN) (5–0)	Wesley (5–1)	Hardin–Simmons (6–1)	Hardin–Simmons (7–1)	John Carroll (8–1)	John Carroll (9–1)	North Central (IL) (10–2)	8.
9.	Wesley	Wesley (1–0)	Saint John's (MN) (1–0)	Saint John's (MN) (2–0)	Saint John's (MN) (3–0)	Saint John's (MN) (4–0)	Hardin–Simmons (4–1)	Hardin–Simmons (5–1)	John Carroll (6–1)	John Carroll (7–1)	St. Thomas (MN) (8–1)	North Central (IL) (9–1)	Muhlenberg (11–2)	9.
10.	Hardin–Simmons	Hardin–Simmons (0–0)	Wisconsin–Whitewater (2–0)	Wisconsin–Whitewater (2–0)	Wisconsin–Whitewater (2–0)	Wisconsin–Oshkosh (3–1)	John Carroll (4–1)	John Carroll (5–1)	Wisconsin–Oshkosh (5–2)	North Central (IL) (7–1)	North Central (IL) (8–1)	Whitworth (9–0)	Whitworth (10–1)	10.
11.	Saint John's (MN)	Saint John's (MN) (1–0)	Linfield (0–1)	Linfield (1–1)	Linfield (1–1)	John Carroll (3–1)	Washington & Jefferson (6–0)	Washington & Jefferson (7–0)	Wittenberg (7–0)	Berry (9–0)	Berry (9–0)	Bethel (MN) (9–1)	RPI (10–2)	11.
12.	Wisconsin–Whitewater	Wisconsin–Whitewater (1–0)	Wheaton (IL) (1–0)	Wisconsin–Oshkosh (2–1)	Wisconsin–Oshkosh (2–1)	Washington & Jefferson (5–0)	Wheaton (IL) (4–1)	Wisconsin–Oshkosh (4–2)	North Central (IL) (6–1)	Whitworth (7–0)	Whitworth (8–0)	Trine (10–0)	Frostburg State (10–1)	12.
13.	Wartburg	Wartburg (1–0)	Washington & Jefferson (2–0)	Washington & Jefferson (3–0)	Washington & Jefferson (4–0)	Wheaton (IL) (3–1)	Wisconsin–Oshkosh (3–2)	Berry (7–0)	Berry (8–0)	Illinois Wesleyan (7–1)	Trine (9–0)	Delaware Valley (9–1)	Brockport (11–1)	13.
14.	Wittenberg	Wittenberg (1–0)	Wittenberg (1–0)	Wittenberg (2–0)	Wittenberg (3–0)	Berry (5–0)	Berry (6–0)	Wittenberg (6–0)	Whitworth (6–0)	Trine (8–0)	RPI (8–0)	Johns Hopkins (9–1)	Centre (10–2)	14.
15.	Washington & Jefferson	Washington & Jefferson (1–0)	Wisconsin–Oshkosh (1–1)	John Carroll (2–0)	John Carroll (2–1)	Trine (4–0)	Trine (5–0)	North Central (IL) (5–1)	Illinois Wesleyan (6–1)	RPI (7–0)	Delaware Valley (8–1)	Illinois Wesleyan (8–2)	St. Thomas (MN) (8–2)	15.
16.	Wisconsin–Platteville	Wheaton (IL) (1–0)	Wisconsin–Platteville (1–0)	Trine (3–0)	Trine (3–0)	Wittenberg (4–0)	Wittenberg (5–0)	Trine (6–0)	Trine (7–0)	Delaware Valley (7–1)	Johns Hopkins (8–1)	St. Thomas (MN) (8–2)	Delaware Valley (9–2)	16.
17.	Delaware Valley	Wisconsin–Platteville (1–0)	Trine (2–0)	Berry (3–0)	Berry (4–0)	North Central (IL) (3–1)	North Central (IL) (4–1)	Illinois Wesleyan (5–1)	RPI (6–0)	Johns Hopkins (7–1)	Illinois Wesleyan (7–2)	Washington & Jefferson (9–1)	Berry (10–2)	17.
18.	Wheaton (IL)	Johns Hopkins (1–0)	Berry (2–0)	Case Western Reserve (2–0)	Case Western Reserve (3–0)	Illinois Wesleyan (3–1)	Illinois Wesleyan (4–1)	Whitworth (5–0)	Muhlenberg (7–0)	Salisbury (8–0)	Washington & Jefferson (8–1)	Wabash (9–1)	Randolph–Macon (9–3)	18.
19.	Johns Hopkins	Trine (1–0)	Case Western Reserve (1–0)	Illinois Wesleyan (1–1)	Illinois Wesleyan (2–1)	Case Western Reserve (4–0)	Whitworth (4–0)	RPI (5–0)	Delaware Valley (6–1)	Washington & Jefferson (7–1)	Case Western Reserve (8–1)	Wittenberg (9–1)	Illinois Wesleyan (8–2)	19.
20.	Trine	Berry (1–0)	John Carroll (1–0)	RPI (3–0)	RPI (4–0)	RPI (4–0)	RPI (5–0)	Muhlenberg (6–0)	Wesley (5–2)	Case Western Reserve (7–1)	Wabash (8–1)	Berry (9–1)	John Carroll (9–2)	20.
21.	Illinois Wesleyan	Illinois Wesleyan (0–0)	RPI (2–0)	Delaware Valley (2–1)	Wheaton (IL) (2–1)	Delaware Valley (4–1)	Case Western Reserve (4–1)	Delaware Valley (5–1)	Washington & Jefferson (7–1)	Wabash (7–1)	Wittenberg (8–1)	Linfield (7–2)	St. Norbert (10–2)	21.
22.	Berry	Case Western Reserve (1–0)	Delaware Valley (1–1)	Wheaton (IL) (1–1)	Delaware Valley (3–1)	Whitworth (3–0)	Delaware Valley (4–1)	Case Western Reserve (5–1)	Case Western Reserve (6–1)	Wittenberg (7–1)	Bethel (MN) (8–1)	Wheaton (IL) (8–2)	Linfield (7–2)	22.
23.	Case Western Reserve	Delaware Valley (0–1)	Wisconsin–La Crosse (2–0)	Wisconsin–La Crosse (2–1)	Wisconsin–La Crosse (2–1)	Ithaca (3–1)	Muhlenberg (5–0)	Wheaton (IL) (4–2)	Johns Hopkins (6–1)	Linfield (5–2)	Wheaton (IL) (7–2)	Muhlenberg (9–1)	Wheaton (IL) (8–2)	23.
24.	Franklin & Marshall	RPI (1–0)	Franklin & Marshall (2–0)	Franklin & Marshall (3–0)	Franklin & Marshall (4–0)	Muhlenberg (4–0)	Linfield (2–2)	Linfield (3–2)	Linfield (4–2)	Wheaton (IL) (6–2)	Linfield (6–2)	Centre (9–1)	Trine (10–1)	24.
25.	RPI	John Carroll (1–0)	Springfield (2–0)	Ithaca (2–1)	Ithaca (3–1)	Linfield (1–2)	Johns Hopkins (5–1)	Johns Hopkins (5–1)	Salisbury (7–0)	Bethel (MN) (7–1)	Baldwin Wallace (8–1)	Washington (MO) (8–2)	Wabash (9–1)	25.
	Preseason July 12	Week 1 September 2	Week 2 September 9	Week 3 September 16	Week 4 September 23	Week 5 September 30	Week 6 October 7	Week 7 October 14	Week 8 October 21	Week 9 October 28	Week 10 November 4	Week 11 November 11	Final December 15	
		Dropped: No. 24 Franklin & Marshall	Dropped: No. 13 Wartburg; No. 18 Johns Hopkins; No. 21 Illinois Wesleyan	Dropped: No. 16 Wisconsin–Platteville; No. 25 Springfield	None	Dropped: No. 23 Wisconsin–La Crosse; No. 24 Franklin & Marshall	Dropped: No. 23 Ithaca	None	Dropped: No. 23 Wheaton (IL)	Dropped: No. 10 Wisconsin–Oshkosh; No. 18 Muhlenberg; No. 20 Wesley	Dropped: No. 18 Salisbury	Dropped: No. 14 RPI; No. 19 Case Western Reserve; No. 25 Baldwin Wallace	Dropped: No. 17 Washington & Jefferson; No. 19 Wittenberg; No. 25 Washington (MO)	

== AFCA Coaches Poll ==
	Week 3 September 17	Week 4 September 24	Week 5 October 1	Week 6 October 8	Week 7 October 15	Week 8 October 22	Week 9 October 29	Week 10 November 5	Week 11 November 12	Final December 17	
1.	Mount Union (2–0) (46)	Mount Union (3–0) (45)	Mount Union (4–0) (43)	Mount Union (5–0) (40)	Mount Union (6–0) (41)	Mount Union (7–0) (42)	Mount Union (8–0) (41)	Mount Union (9–0) (40)	Mount Union (10–0) (41)	Mary Hardin–Baylor (15–0) (50)	1.
2.	Mary Hardin–Baylor (2–0) (6)	Mary Hardin–Baylor (3–0) (7)	Mary Hardin–Baylor (4–0) (9)	Mary Hardin–Baylor (5–0) (12)	Mary Hardin–Baylor (6–0) (10)	Mary Hardin–Baylor (7–0) (10)	Mary Hardin–Baylor (8–0) (11)	Mary Hardin–Baylor (9–0) (11)	Mary Hardin–Baylor (10–0) (11)	Mount Union (14–1)	2.
3.	St. Thomas (MN) (2–0)	St. Thomas (MN) (3–0)	St. Thomas (MN) (4–0)	St. Thomas (MN) (5–0)	Brockport (6–0)	Brockport (7–0)	Brockport (8–0)	Brockport (9–0)	Brockport (10–0)	Wisconsin–Whitewater (12–1)	3.
4.	Brockport (3–0)	Brockport (3–0)	Brockport (4–0)	Brockport (5–0)	Wisconsin–Whitewater (5–0)	Wisconsin–Whitewater (6–0)	Wisconsin–Whitewater (7–0)	Wisconsin–Whitewater (8–0)	Wisconsin–Whitewater (9–0)	Saint John's (MN) (12–1)	4.
5.	North Central (IL) (2–0)	North Central (IL) (3–0)	Wesley (4–0)	Wisconsin–Whitewater (4–0)	Saint John's (MN) (6–0)	Saint John's (MN) (7–0)	Saint John's (MN) (8–0)	Saint John's (MN) (9–0)	Saint John's (MN) (10–0)	Johns Hopkins (12–2)	5.
6.	Hardin–Simmons (2–0)	Wesley (3–0)	Hardin–Simmons (4–0)	Frostburg State (4–0)	Frostburg State (5–0)	Frostburg State (6–0)	Frostburg State (7–0)	Frostburg State (8–0)	Frostburg State (9–0)	Bethel (MN) (11–2)	6.
7.	Wesley (2–0)	Hardin–Simmons (3–0)	Wisconsin–Whitewater (3–0)	Saint John's (MN) (5–0)	Washington & Jefferson (7–0)	St. Thomas (MN) (6–1)	St. Thomas (MN) (7–1)	St. Thomas (MN) (8–1)	Hardin–Simmons (9–1)	Hardin–Simmons (9–2)	7.
8.	Wisconsin–Whitewater (2–0)	Wisconsin–Whitewater (2–0)	Frostburg State (3–0)	Washington & Jefferson (6–0)	Wittenberg (6–0)	Wittenberg (7–0)	Hardin–Simmons (7–1)	Hardin–Simmons (8–1)	John Carroll (9–1)	Frostburg State (10–1)	8.
9.	Frostburg State (2–0)	Frostburg State (3–0)	Saint John's (MN) (4–0)	Wittenberg (5–0)	Wesley (5–1)	Hardin–Simmons (6–1)	Berry (9–0)	Berry (9–0)	North Central (IL) (9–1)	North Central (IL) (10–2)	9.
10.	Saint John's (MN) (2–0)	Saint John's (MN) (3–0)	Washington & Jefferson (5–0)	Wesley (4–1)	St. Thomas (MN) (5–1)	Berry (8–0)	John Carroll (7–1)	John Carroll (8–1)	Trine (10–0)	Muhlenberg (11–2)	10.
11.	Wittenberg (2–0)	Wittenberg (3–0)	Wisconsin–Oshkosh (3–1)	Hardin–Simmons (4–1)	Hardin–Simmons (5–1)	John Carroll (6–1)	Trine (8–0)	North Central (IL) (8–1)	Whitworth (9–0) т	Brockport (11–1)	11.
12.	Washington & Jefferson (3–0)	Washington & Jefferson (4–0)	Wittenberg (4–0)	Berry (6–0)	Berry (7–0)	Trine (7–0)	North Central (IL) (7–1)	Trine (9–0)	Delaware Valley (9–1) т	RPI (10–2)	12.
13.	Wisconsin–Oshkosh (2–1)	Wisconsin–Oshkosh (2–1)	Berry (5–0)	John Carroll (4–1)	John Carroll (5–1)	North Central (IL) (6–1)	Delaware Valley (7–1)	Delaware Valley (8–1)	Johns Hopkins (9–1)	Whitworth (10–1)	13.
14.	Linfield (1–1)	Linfield (1–1)	Trine (4–0)	Trine (5–0)	Trine (6–0)	Wisconsin–Oshkosh (5–2)	RPI (7–0)	RPI (8–0)	Washington & Jefferson (9–1)	John Carroll (9–2)	14.
15.	John Carroll (2–0)	Trine (3–0)	John Carroll (3–1)	Wheaton (IL) (4–1)	North Central (IL) (5–1)	Delaware Valley (6–1)	Illinois Wesleyan (7–1)	Whitworth (8–0)	Bethel (MN) (9–1)	Centre (10–2)	15.
16.	Trine (3–0)	Berry (4–0)	Case Western Reserve (4–0)	North Central (IL) (4–1)	Delaware Valley (5–1)	RPI (6–0)	Whitworth (7–0)	Johns Hopkins (8–1)	Wittenberg (9–1)	Berry (10–2) т	16.
17.	Berry (3–0)	John Carroll (2–1)	Wheaton (IL) (3–1)	Delaware Valley (4–1)	RPI (5–0)	Illinois Wesleyan (6–1)	Washington & Jefferson (7–1)	Washington & Jefferson (8–1)	Wabash (9–1)	Delaware Valley (9–2) т	17.
18.	Case Western Reserve (2–0)	Case Western Reserve (3–0)	North Central (IL) (3–1)	RPI (5–0)	Wisconsin–Oshkosh (4–2)	Whitworth (6–0)	Johns Hopkins (7–1)	Case Western Reserve (8–1)	Berry (9–1)	St. Thomas (MN) (8–2)	18.
19.	RPI (3–0)	RPI (4–0)	Delaware Valley (4–1)	Illinois Wesleyan (4–1)	Illinois Wesleyan (5–1)	Washington & Jefferson (7–1)	Case Western Reserve (7–1)	Wittenberg (8–1)	St. Thomas (MN) (8–2)	Trine (10–1)	19.
20.	Delaware Valley (2–1)	Delaware Valley (3–1)	RPI (4–0)	Central (IA) (6–0)	Central (IA) (7–0)	Case Western Reserve (6–1)	Wittenberg (7–1)	Wabash (8–1)	Linfield (7–2)	Wittenberg (9–1)	20.
21.	Franklin & Marshall (3–0)	Illinois Wesleyan (2–1)	Illinois Wesleyan (3–1)	Wisconsin–Oshkosh (3–2)	Whitworth (5–0)	Johns Hopkins (6–1)	Salisbury (8–0)	Baldwin Wallace (8–1)	Illinois Wesleyan (8–2)	St. Norbert (10–2)	21.
22.	Wabash (3–0)	Wabash (3–0)	Wabash (3–0)	Whitworth (4–0)	Case Western Reserve (5–1)	Muhlenberg (7–0)	Wabash (7–1)	Linfield (6–2)	Muhlenberg (9–1)	Washington & Jefferson (9–2)	22.
23.	Illinois Wesleyan (1–1)	Franklin & Marshall (4–0)	Central (IA) (5–0)	Case Western Reserve (4–1)	Johns Hopkins (5–1) т	Wesley (5–2)	Linfield (5–2)	Bethel (MN) (8–1)	RPI (8–1)	Wabash (9–1)	23.
24.	Wheaton (IL) (1–1)	Wheaton (IL) (2–1)	Whitworth (3–0)	Johns Hopkins (5–1)	Muhlenberg (6–0) т	Salisbury (7–0)	Baldwin Wallace (7–1)	Illinois Wesleyan (7–2)	Wheaton (IL) (8–2)	Randolph–Macon (9–3)	24.
25.	Wisconsin–La Crosse (2–1)	Wisconsin–La Crosse (2–1)	Johns Hopkins (4–1)	Muhlenberg (5–0)	Salisbury (6–0)	Linfield (4–2)	Bethel (MN) (7–1)	Muhlenberg (8–1)	Baldwin Wallace (8–2)	Illinois Wesleyan (8–2)	25.
	Week 3 September 17	Week 4 September 24	Week 5 October 1	Week 6 October 8	Week 7 October 15	Week 8 October 22	Week 9 October 29	Week 10 November 5	Week 11 November 12	Final December 17	
		None	Dropped: No. 14 Linfield; No. 23 Franklin & Marshall; No. 25 Wisconsin–La Crosse	Dropped: No. 22 Wabash	Dropped: No. 15 Wheaton (IL)	Dropped: No. 20 Central (IA)	Dropped: No. 14 Wisconsin–Oshkosh; No. 22 Muhlenberg; No. 23 Wesley	Dropped: No. 21 Salisbury	Dropped: No. 18 Case Western Reserve	Dropped: No. 20 Linfield; No. 24 Wheaton (IL); No. 25 Baldwin Wallace	
