= 2024 Berry Vikings football team =

American college football season

2024 Berry Vikings football

SAA co-champion

NCAA Division III First Round, L 16–20 Maryville (TN)
- Conference: Southern Athletic Association
- Record: 8–3 (6–1 SAA)
- Head coach: Tony Kunczewski (12th season)
- Defensive coordinator: Joel Elliott (3rd season)
- Home stadium: Valhalla Stadium

2024 Southern Athletic Association football standings
	Conf.			Overall
Team	W		L	W		L
Berry +^	6	–	1	8	–	3
Centre +^	6	–	1	8	–	3
Trinity (TX) +^	6	–	1	8	–	3
Millsaps	3	–	4	5	–	5
Hendrix	2	–	5	4	–	6
Southwestern (TX)	2	–	5	4	–	6
Rhodes	2	–	5	3	–	7
Sewanee	1	–	6	2	–	8
+ – Conference co-champions; ^ – NCAA Division III playoff participant

The 2024 Berry Vikings football team represented Berry College as a member of the Southern Athletic Association (SAA) during the 2024 NCAA Division III football season. The Spartans, led by 12th-year head coach Tony Kunczewski, played their home games at Valhalla Stadium in Mount Berry, Georgia.

== Schedule ==
Date	Time	Opponent	Rank	Site	TV	Result	Attendance	Source
September 7	7:00 p.m.	at Huntingdon*	No. 25	Samford Stadium; Montgomery, AL		W 43–7	2,000	
September 14	1:00 p.m.	No. 25 DePauw*	No. 22	Valhalla Stadium; Mount Berry, GA		L 0–33	2,325	
September 21	1:00 p.m.	at No. 10 Randolph–Macon*		Day Field; Ashland, VA		W 28–24	2,117	
October 5	6:00 p.m.	Southwestern (TX)*		Valhalla Stadium; Mount Berry, GA		W 44–7	3,000	
October 12	1:00 p.m.	at Hendrix		Young–Wise Memorial Stadium; Conway, AR		W 42–13	2,000	
October 19	2:00 p.m.	Sewanee	No. 25	Valhalla Stadium; Mount Berry, GA		W 53–10	501	
October 26	1:00 p.m.	at Trinity (TX)		Trinity Stadium; San Antonio, TX		L 35–38	2,024	
November 2	1:00 p.m.	Centre		Valhalla Stadium; Mount Berry, GA		W 28–21	2,069	
November 9	1:00 p.m.	Millsaps		Valhalla Stadium; Mount Berry, GA		W 45–7	2,450	
November 16	1:00 p.m.	at Rhodes		Crain Field; Memphis, TN		W 48–14		
November 23	12:00 p.m.	Maryville (TN)*		Valhalla Stadium; Mount Berry, GA (NCAA Division III First Round)	ESPN+	L 16–20	2,000	
*Non-conference game; Rankings from D3 Poll released prior to the game; All times are in Eastern time

== Rankings ==
Ranking movements Legend: ██ Increase in ranking ██ Decrease in ranking RV = Received votes
	Week												
Poll	Pre	1	2	3	4	5	6	7	8	9	10	11	Final
D3	25	22	RV	RV	RV	RV	25	RV	RV	RV	RV	RV	
AFCA	24	21	RV	RV	RV	RV	RV		RV	RV	RV	RV	
