= 2013 Rhodes Lynx football team =

American college football season

2013 Rhodes Lynx football

SAA co-champion
- Conference: Southern Athletic Association
- Record: 8–2 (5–1 SAA)
- Head coach: Dan Gritti (3rd season)
- Offensive coordinator: Rich DeMaio (3rd season)
- Defensive coordinator: David Szentesy (2nd season)
- Captains: Stanton Brown; Zac Hart; Landon Jones; Dane Wilson
- Home stadium: Crain Field

2013 Southern Athletic Association football standings
	Conf.			Overall
Team	W		L	W		L
Millsaps +	5	–	1	9	–	1
Rhodes +	5	–	1	8	–	2
Centre	4	–	2	7	–	3
Birmingham–Southern	3	–	3	5	–	4
Sewanee	3	–	3	4	–	6
Hendrix	1	–	5	3	–	7
Berry	0	–	6	0	–	9
+ – Conference co-champions

The 2013 Rhodes Lynx football team represented Rhodes College as a member of the Southern Athletic Association (SAA) during the 2013 NCAA Division III football season. Led by third-year head coach Dan Gritti, the Lynx compiled an overall record of 8–2 with a mark of 5–1 in conference play, tying for first place in the SAA. The Lynx played games at Crain Field in Memphis, Tennessee.

It was the first conference championship for Rhodes since 1995.

== Schedule ==
Date	Time	Opponent	Site	Result	Attendance	Source
September 7	1:00 p.m.	Austin*	Crain Field; Memphis, TN	W 24–21^{(OT)}	1,000	
September 14	1:00 p.m.	at Washington University*	Francis Olympic Field; St. Louis, MO	L 7–10^{(2OT)}	2,026	
September 21	7:00 p.m.	at Claremont-Mudd-Scripps*	Zinda Field; Claremont, CA	W 36–9	672	
September 28	1:00 p.m.	Berry	Crain Field; Memphis, TN	W 36–24	2,198	
October 5	1:00 p.m.	Chicago*	Crain Field; Memphis, TN	W 41–34	3,021	
October 12	1:00 p.m.	at Sewanee	McGee Field; Sewanee, TN	W 50–23	4,325	
October 26	2:00 p.m.	Centre^{†}	Crain Field; Memphis, TN	W 35–14	3,892	
November 2	1:00 p.m.	at Birmingham–Southern	Battle Field; Birmingham, AL	L 34–35	3,582	
November 9	1:00 p.m.	at Hendrix	Young-Wise Memorial Stadium; Conway, AR	W 55–36	1,475	
November 16	1:00 p.m.	Millsaps	Crain Field; Memphis, TN	W 49–30	5,961	
*Non-conference game; ^{†}Homecoming
