= 2018 Mary Hardin–Baylor Crusaders football team =

American college football season

2018 Mary Hardin–Baylor Crusaders football

NCAA Division III champion ASC champion

Stagg Bowl, W 24–16 vs. Mount Union
- Conference: American Southwest Conference

Ranking
- D3Football.com: No. 1
- Record: 15–0 (9–0 ASC)
- Head coach: Pete Fredenburg (22nd season)
- Offensive coordinator: Stephen Lee (4th season)
- Offensive scheme: Pro-style
- Defensive coordinator: Larry Harmon (17th season)
- Base defense: 3–4
- Home stadium: Crusader Stadium

2018 American Southwest Conference football standings
	Conf.			Overall
Team	W		L	W		L
No. 1 Mary Hardin–Baylor $^	9	–	0	15	–	0
No. 7 Hardin–Simmons ^	8	–	1	9	–	2
Texas Lutheran	6	–	3	7	–	3
East Texas Baptist	6	–	3	6	–	4
Southwestern (TX)	5	–	4	6	–	4
Louisiana College	5	–	4	5	–	5
Belhaven #	2	–	7	2	–	8
McMurry	2	–	7	2	–	8
Howard Payne	1	–	8	1	–	9
Sul Ross	1	–	8	1	–	9
$ – Conference champion; ^ – NCAA Division III playoff participant; # – Provisional NCAA Division III member; Rankings from D3football.com

The 2018 Mary Hardin–Baylor Crusaders football team was an American football team that represented the University of Mary Hardin–Baylor in the American Southwest Conference (ASC) during the 2018 NCAA Division III football season. In their 22nd year under head coach Pete Fredenburg, the team compiled a 15–0 record (9–0 against conference opponents) and won the ASC championship. The team advanced to the NCAA Division III playoffs and defeated Mount Union, 24–16, in the 2018 Stagg Bowl.

Three Mary Hardin-Baylor players were selected by the Associated Press as first-team players on its Division III All-America team: running back Markeith Miller; linebacker Jalen Martin; and defensive back Jefferson Fritz.

The team played its home games at Crusader Stadium in Belton, Texas.

== Schedule ==
Date	Time	Opponent	Rank	Site	Result	Attendance	Source
September 8		at Albright*	No. 2	Shirk Stadium; Reading, PA	W 91–7	2,754	
September 15		at Sul Ross	No. 2	Jackson Field; Alpine, TX	W 68–7	1,923	
September 22		at Texas Lutheran	No. 2	Bulldog Stadium; Seguin, TX	W 47–14	1,538	
September 29		Southwestern (TX)	No. 2	Crusader Stadium; Belton, TX	W 77–7	7,436	
October 6		No. 7 Hardin–Simmons	No. 2	Crusader Stadium; Belton, TX	W 26–0	5,065	
October 12		at Howard Payne	No. 2	Gordon Wood Stadium; Brownwood, TX	W 55–0	925	
October 20		at Belhaven	No. 2	Belhaven Bowl; Jackson, MS	W 49–0	798	
October 27		McMurry	No. 2	Crusader Stadium; Belton, TX	W 80–7	4,926	
November 3		Louisiana College	No. 2	Crusader Stadium; Belton, TX	W 80–7	3,566	
November 10		at East Texas Baptist	No. 2	Ornelas Stadium; Marshall, TX	W 50–15	2,318	
November 17		No. 7 Hardin–Simmons*	No. 2	Crusader Stadium; Belton, TX (NCAA Division III first round)	W 27–6	3,176	
November 24		No. 18 Berry*	No. 2	Crusader Stadium; Belton, TX (NCAA Division III second round)	W 75–9	2,615	
December 1	12:00 p.m.	No. 3 Saint John's (MN)*	No. 2	Crusader Stadium; Belton, TX (NCAA Division III quarterfinal)	W 21–18	2,819	
December 8		No. 4 Wisconsin–Whitewater*	No. 2	Crusader Stadium; Belton, TX (NCAA Division III semifinal)	W 31–14	2,599	
December 14	6:00 p.m.	vs. No. 1 Mount Union*	No. 2	Woodforest Bank Stadium; Shenandoah, TX (Stagg Bowl)	W 24–16	6,816	
*Non-conference game; Rankings from D3Football.com Poll released prior to the game; All times are in Central time

== Roster ==
2018 Mary Hardin–Baylor Crusaders football team roster
Players
Coaches
Offense

Pos.	#	Name	Class
WR	1	Kadarius Daniels	Jr
WR	4	Aaron Sims	Fr
WR	9	Derek Sides	Sr
WR	10	T.J. Josey	Sr
QB	11	Luke Poorman	Jr
QB	12	De'Nerian Thomas	Sr
WR	13	Demetrius Taylor	Sr
QB	14	Holten Einkauf	Sr
WR	15	Jonel Reed	Jr
WR	16	K.J. Miller	So
QB	17	Aaron Conkleton	Sr
QB	18	Jase Hammack	Jr
QB	19	Ryan Redding	Fr
QB	20	Michael Dearman	So
RB	21	Markeith Miller	Sr
RB	22	Marquis Duncan	So
RB	27	Olan Vining III	So
TE	45	Alexzander Goosby	So
TE	47	Caleb Johnson	So
OL	54	DoRion Dreighton	So
OL	55	Colton Hall	Sr
OL	56	Cameron Cardin	Fr
OL	61	Jeffery Sims Jr.	Fr
OL	63	Lane Smith	Sr
OL	64	Eric Blair Jr.	Sr
OL	65	Steven Sellers	So
OL	70	Domenico Valdespino	So
OL	71	Bailey Adams	So
OL	72	David Castles	Fr
OL	73	Clinton Middleton	Fr
OL	75	Cameron Williams	Fr
OL	76	Azaviar Carter	So
OL	78	Eric Rodriguez	Fr
WR	80	Jamal Long	Fr
WR	81	Niyl Campbell	Jr
TE	83	Ethan Owens	So
TE	87	Tyvavion Russell	So
RB		Alex Acuna	Fr
RB		Gabriel Ardoin	Fr
WR		Christian Battle	Fr
WR		Derrick Bayer	Fr
WR		Cabot Booth	Fr
QB		Daniel Bresko	Fr
WR		Cobe Burch	Fr
RB		Aaron Campbell-Love	Fr
OL		Seth Carpenter	Fr
RB		Frank Chew	Fr
OL		Preston Coyle	Fr
QB		Terrence Crenshaw	Fr
WR		Clayton Deaver	Fr
TE		J'Lon Douglas	Fr
TE		Kellen Everett	Fr
WR		Tyler Fuller	Fr
WR		James Garcia	Fr
TE		Justin Gipson	Fr
RB		Dammion Green	Fr
WR		Coylin Grimes	Fr
QB		Hayden Haire	Fr
OL		Gerardo Hermosillo	Fr
TE		Kristopher Ingram	Fr
OL		Austin Johnson	Fr
WR		Jaeden Johnson	Fr
RB		Dimitri Jones	Fr
WR		Jaylen Jones	Fr
WR		Jordan Jones	Fr
OL		Lance Jones	Fr
OL		Donny Keeling	Fr
WR		Jordan Khalil	Fr
WR		Jalon Kirven	Fr
OL		Shannon Lambert II	Fr
OL		Jordan Mailloux	Fr
WR		Colten Manjack	Fr
WR		Blaine McDaniel	Fr
FB		Jaikem Murphy	Fr
OL		Wyatt Neuman	So
WR		Kaidyn Peralez	Fr
WR		Caleb Reimers	Fr
WR		Clay Richters	Fr
WR		Matthew Rodriguez	Fr
RB		Stephen Rowe	Jr
WR		Michael Stimpson	Fr
TE		Nicholas Taylor	Fr
QB		Jace Terry	Fr
WR		Chris Tucker	Fr
WR		Alex Walker	Fr
WR		Chaka Watson	Fr
QB		D.J. Weaver	Fr
TE		Marcus Williams	Fr

Defense

Pos.	#	Name	Class
DB	2	Jefferson Fritz	So
CB	3	Rozzell Barber-Harris	Sr
CB	5	Keith Gipson	Jr
LB	6	Santos Villarreal	Sr
CB	7	Reginald Cole	Sr
LB	23	Jacob Zuber	Fr
LB	24	Jalen Martin	Sr
DB	25	Raylon Hickey	Sr
CB	28	Jon Hughes	Jr
DB	29	Jimario Grounds	Sr
LB	30	Domonique Neroes	Jr
LB	31	Darius Dorsey	Jr
DE	32	E'Monte Smith	So
FS	33	Robbie West	Jr
CB	34	Marcus McCrea	So
FS	35	Josh Springer	Fr
FS	36	Mikkah Hackett	So
DB	37	Jacob Mueller	So
CB	38	DeVante Rhodes	Jr
CB	39	Sabian Cannon	Jr
LB	40	De Jackson	Sr
LB	41	Akeem Jackson	So
FS	43	Jamal Williams	Fr
FS	46	Hunter Longcrier	Fr
DE	48	Landon Maston	So
DE	51	Khevon Shepard	So
DL	52	Elijah Cross	Jr
DT	57	Joey Longoria	Jr
DT	60	Joshua Gallegos	So
LB	84	Daylon Nebgen	Fr
DE	91	Peter Kimani	Fr
DE	92	Aaron Edelmon	Fr
DT	94	Cullen Yates	Fr
DT	95	Sedryk Hernandez	Fr
DT	96	Pete Smith	Fr
DT	97	Isaiah Johnson	Jr
DT	98	Malik Benson	So
DE	99	C.J. Kuehler	Fr
CB		Drevyn Boyd	So
LB		Brayden Bradley	Fr
DE		Mason Chapa	So
DB		Quincey Chapman	Fr
CB		D.J. Daniels	Fr
FS		Allen Dukes	Fr
DT		Gideon Fry	Fr
FS		Moxie Garrett	Fr
DT		Giante Hicks	Fr
FS		Cutter Hudgens	Fr
LB		Jordan Jackson	So
LB		Egypt Johnson	Jr
CB		Trey Jones	Fr
FS		Derek Jones Jr.	Fr
CB		Kameron Marshall	Fr
CB		Chase Martinez	Fr
LB		Sante Parker Jr.	Fr
CB		Andrew Phipps	Fr
FS		Camden Rhodes	Fr
DE		Clay Riddle	Fr
DT		John-Anthony Robinson	Fr
DT		Greg Roquemore Jr.	Fr
LB		Adam Ruth	So
DE		Mar'Qualeon Ruth	So
LB		Austin Sanchez	Fr
FS		Ryan Shockency	Fr
DB		Jayden Smith	So
FS		Jayton Smith	Fr
CB		Anthony Stamps	Fr
LB		Chase Tomlinson	Fr
DT		Ethan Tran	Fr
FS		Aaron Vick	Fr
FS		Jayden Webb	Fr
LB		Willy Whigham	Fr
CB		Carlin Wiseman	Fr

Special teams

Pos.	#	Name	Class
K	89	Anthony Avila	Fr
K		Naol Gonfa	Fr

Head coach

- Pete Fredenburg

Coordinators/assistant coaches

- Larry Harmon – Defensive Coordinator - Football
- Stephen Lee – Offensive Coordinator - Football
- Nathaniel Hogge – Assistant Coach - Football
- Jack Johnson – Special Teams Coordinator/Linebackers - Football
- Mark Carey – Assistant Coach - Football
- Steven Thrash – Assistant Coach/Head JV Coach - Football
- Dustin Washburn – Assistant Coach - Football
- Nick Brace – Graduate Assistant Coach - Football
- Drake Dowling – Graduate Assistant Coach - Football
- Christopher Fields – Graduate Assistant Coach - Football
- Jake Hardcastle – Graduate Assistant Coach - Football
- Olanda James – Recruiting and Academics Coordinator - Football
- Solomon Perdue – Graduate Assistant Coach - Football
- Mason Salmans – Graduate Assistant Coach - Football
- Hunter Schmidt – Graduate Assistant Coach - Football
- Savannah Seybold – Academic Coordinator - Football
- Donovan Williams – Graduate Assistant Coach - Football
- Haston Adams – Student Assistant Coach - Football
- Corbin Campitelli – Student Assistant Coach - Football
- Evan Gay – Student Assistant Coach - Football
- Kris Johnson – Student Assistant Coach - Football
- Karen Goff – Operations Coordinator - Football

Legend

- (C) Team captain
- (S) Suspended
- (I) Ineligible
- Injured
- Redshirt

Roster
