= Wartburg Knights football =

Football program representing Wartburg College

2026 Wartburg Knights football team
- First season: 1935; 91 years ago
- Athletic director: John Cochrane
- Head coach: Chris Winter; 5th season, 53–8 (.869)
- Location: Waverly, Iowa
- Stadium: Walston-Hoover Stadium (capacity: 5,000)
- NCAA division: Division III
- Conference: ARC
- Colors: Orange and Black
- All-time record: 508–318–7 (.614)

Conference championships
- 21
- Consensus All-Americans: 6
- Mascot: Knights
- Website: go-knights.net

The Wartburg Knights football program is the intercollegiate American football team for Wartburg College located in Waverly, Iowa. The team competes in the NCAA Division III and a member of the American Rivers Conference (ARC). Wartburg's first football team was fielded in 1929 with varsity play starting in 1935. The team plays its home games at Walston-Hoover stadium in Waverly, Iowa.

== Conference affiliations ==
- Iowa Intercollegiate Athletic Conference (1936–2018)
- American Rivers Conference (2018–present)

== Playoffs ==
The Knights have appeared in the NCAA Division III playoffs 18 times, most recently in 2025. They have not had a losing season since 1988. Their combined playoff record is 18–18.

=== NCAA Division III playoffs ===
Season	Coach	Playoff	Opponent	Result
1982	Don Canfield	First round	Bishop	L 7–32
1993	Bob Nielson	Regionals	Wisconsin–La Crosse	L 26–55
1994	Bob Nielson	Regionals	Central (IA)	W 22–21
1994	Bob Nielson	Quarterfinals	Saint John's (MN)	L 14–42
1999	Rick Willis	Regionals	Pacific Lutheran	L 14–49
2002	Rick Willis	First Round	Lake Forest	W 45–0
2002	Rick Willis	Second Round	Linfield	L 15–52
2003	Rick Willis	First Round	Bethel	W 21–7
2003	Rick Willis	Second Round	Linfield	L 20–23
2004	Rick Willis	First Round	Concordia–Moorhead	L 14–28
2008	Rick Willis	First Round	Wisconsin–Stevens Point	W 26–21
2008	Rick Willis	Second Round	Monmouth	W 30–28
2008	Rick Willis	Quarterfinals	Wisconsin–Whitewater	L 17–34
2010	Rick Willis	First Round	Bethel	L 20–28
2013	Rick Willis	First Round	Illinois Wesleyan	W 41–7
2013	Rick Willis	Second Round	Bethel	L 27–34
2014	Rick Willis	First Round	St. Thomas	W 37–31
2014	Rick Willis	Second Round	Saint John's (MN)	W 21–10
2014	Rick Willis	Quarterfinals	Wisconsin–Whitewater	L 33–37
2017	Rick Willis	First Round	Franklin	W 35–34 ^{OT}
2017	Rick Willis	Second Round	Trine	W 49–7
2017	Rick Willis	Quarterfinals	Wisconsin–Oshkosh	L 27–41
2018	Rick Willis	First Round	Bethel	L 14–41
2019	Rick Willis	First Round	Hope	W 41–3
2019	Rick Willis	Second Round	Wisconsin–Whitewater	L 28–41
2022	Chris Winter	First Round	Wisconsin–LaCrosse	W 14–6
2022	Chris Winter	Second Round	Saint John's (MN)	W 23–20
2022	Chris Winter	Quarterfinals	Aurora	W 45–17
2022	Chris Winter	Semifinals	Mount Union	L 31–34
2023	Chris Winter	First Round	Illinois College	W 49–14
2023	Chris Winter	Second Round	Whitworth	W 42–20
2023	Chris Winter	Quarterfinals	Wisconsin–Whitewater	W 31–28
2023	Chris Winter	Semifinals	North Central (IL)	L 27–34
2024	Chris Winter	Second Round	Wisconsin–Platteville	W 19–14
2024	Chris Winter	Third Round	Bethel (MN)	L 14–24
2025	Chris Winter	Second Round	Wheaton	L 24–28

== Championships ==
=== Conference championships ===
The Knights have won 21 conference championships

Year	Coach	Overall record	Conference record
1958	Norman Johansen	8–0–1	7–0–1
1959	Norman Johansen	8–1	8–0
1968	Lee Bondhus	7–1–1	6–0–1
1982	Don Canfield	8–2	7–0
1983†	Don Canfield	8–1	6–1
1993	Bob Nielson	9–2	8–1
1999	Rick Willis	10–1	10–0
2002†	Rick Willis	10–2	8–1
2003	Rick Willis	11–1	8–0
2004†	Rick Willis	8–3	6–2
2008	Rick Willis	10–3	7–1
2010	Rick Willis	10–1	8–0
2013	Rick Willis	9–3	6–1
2014	Rick Willis	12–1	7–0
2017	Rick Willis	12–1	8–0
2018	Rick Willis	8–3	7–1
2019†	Rick Willis	10–2	7–1
2022	Chris Winter	13–1	8–0
2023	Chris Winter	13–1	8–0
2024	Chris Winter	10–2	8–0
2025	Chris Winter	10–1	8–0

† Co-champions

== Individual awards ==
=== IIAC/ARC Conference awards ===
Conference awards
Year	Player	Type
1968	Murray McMurray	Most Valuable Player
1969	Connie Hellerich	Most Valuable Player
1982	Mike Ward	Most Valuable Player
1983	Scott Fritz	Most Valuable Player
1984	Gary Walljasper	Most Valuable Player
1995	Vince Penningroth	Most Valuable Player
1999	Matt Wheeler	Most Valuable Player
2014	Logan Schrader; Spencer Capitani	Offensive Most Valuable Player; Defensive Most Valuable Player
2015	Logan Schrader	Offensive Most Valuable Player
2017	Matt Sacia	Offensive Most Valuable Player
2018	Matt Sacia	Offensive Most Valuable Player
2022	Hunter Clasen; Owen Grover	Offensive Most Valuable Player; Defensive Most Valuable Player
2023	Hunter Clasen; Owen Grover	Offensive Most Valuable Player; Defensive Most Valuable Player
2024	Parker Rochford	Defensive Most Valuable Player
2025	Keenan Tyler; Sam Heither	Defensive Most Valuable Player; Rookie of the Year

=== Cliff Harris Award ===
Best Defensive Player in Division III

Cliff Harris Award
Year	Player
2023	Owen Grover

== Current coaching staff ==
- Head coach: Chris Winter
- Assistant head coach, offensive coordinator, quarterbacks: Matt Wheeler
- Defensive coordinator, linebackers, recruiting coordinator: Matt Tschetter
- Offensive line: Luke Summers
- Defensive line: Ethan Lape
- Wide receivers: Matt Buckner
- Running backs: Jawanza Holmes
- Assistant coach: Jeff Beck
- Tight ends: Paul Mugan
- Specialists: Steve Kingery
- Student coach: Grant Halverson
- Athletic Trainer: Danny Drees
- Athletic Trainer: Jess Albright

== Head coaches ==
As of the completion of 2025

Tenure	Coach	Years	Record	Pct.	Con. Titles
1935–1937, 1944–1945	Elmer Hertel	5	9–18–0	.333	0
1938–1939	Ralph McKinzie	2	0–12–0	.000	0
1940–1942	CC Van Dyke	3	6–13–0	.316	0
1946	Stanley Hall	1	2–5–0	.286	0
1947–1950	Melvin Nelson	4	15–18–1	.456	0
1951	Earnest Oppermann	1	2–5–0	.286	0
1952–1964	Norm Johansen	13	53–54–4	.495	2
1965–1972	Lee Bondhus	8	24–47–1	.340	1
1973–1990	Don Canfield	18	97–71–1	.577	2
1991–1995	Bob Nielson	5	39–14–0	.736	1
1996	Steve Hagen	1	7–3–0	.700	0
2006–2007	Eric Koehler	2	16–4–0	.800	0
1997–2005, 2008–2020	Rick Willis	21	185–46–0	.801	11
2021–present	Chris Winter	5	53–8–0	.869	4
Totals	14 coaches	89 seasons	508–318–7	.614	21 titles

== Final rankings ==
Following the 2025 season, Wartburg has been ranked in the final D3football.com Poll 14 times and the AFCA Coaches Poll 5 times.

Year	D3 ranking	AFCA ranking	Record
1999	NR	No. 12	10–1
2000	NR	No. 18	9–1
2002	NR	No. 15	10–2
2003	No. 4	No. 6	11–1
2004	No. 24	NR	8–3
2007	No. 20	No. 25	8–2
2008	No. 10	No. 11	10–3
2010	No. 12	No. 11	10–1
2013	No. 14	No. 15	9–3
2014	No. 4	No. 4	12–1
2015	No. 24	NR	9–1
2017	No. 10	No. 8	12–1
2019	No. 14	No. 13	10–2
2022	No. 3	No. 4	13–1
2023	No. 3	No. 3	13–1
2024	No. 13	No. 12	10–2
2025	No. 12	No. 14	10–1

== Notable former players ==
- Bob Nielson
- Matt Entz
- Chris Winter
