= 2013 Hampden–Sydney Tigers football team =

American college football season

2013 Hampden–Sydney Tigers football

ODAC champion

Division III Playoffs Second Round, L 21–31 vs. Linfield
- Conference: Old Dominion Athletic Conference

Ranking
- AFCA: No. 22
- D3Football.com: No. 18
- Record: 9–3 (6–1 ODAC)
- Head coach: Marty Favret (14th season)
- Offensive scheme: Spread
- Defensive coordinator: Wes Dodson (7th season)
- Base defense: 3–3–5
- Home stadium: Everett Stadium

2013 Old Dominion Athletic Conference football standings
	Conf.			Overall
Team	W		L	W		L
No. 18 Hampden–Sydney $^	6	–	1	9	–	3
Randolph–Macon	5	–	2	7	–	3
Guilford	5	–	2	6	–	4
Catholic University	3	–	4	6	–	4
Washington and Lee	3	–	4	5	–	5
Shenandoah	3	–	4	4	–	6
Emory & Henry	2	–	5	5	–	5
Bridgewater	1	–	6	4	–	6
$ – Conference champion; ^ – NCAA Division III playoff participant; Rankings from D3football.com

The 2013 Hampden–Sydney Tigers football team represented Hampden–Sydney College in the 2013 NCAA Division III football season. It was the Tigers' 119th overall, the 38th as a member of the Old Dominion Athletic Conference. The team was led by Marty Favret, in his fourteenth year as head coach, and played its home games at Lewis C. Everett Stadium in Death Valley, Hampden–Sydney, Virginia. They finished the season 9–3, 6–1 in ODAC play to finish in first place in the conference. They received an automatic bid to the Division III Playoffs where they defeated Maryville in the first round and lost to #2 Linfield in the second round.

== Schedule ==
Date	Time	Opponent	Site	Result	Attendance
September 7	1:00 pm	Averett*	Everett Stadium; Hampden–Sydney, VA	W 42–12	4,268
September 14	1:00 pm	at Christopher Newport*	Pomoco Stadium; Newport News, VA	L 7–17	6,675
September 21	1:00 pm	at Coast Guard*	Cadet Memorial Field; New London, CT	W 49–7	1,300
October 5	1:00 pm	Catholic	Everett Stadium; Hampden–Sydney, VA	W 39–27	4,037
October 12	1:00 pm	Bridgewater	Everett Stadium; Hampden–Sydney, VA	W 28–7	3,568
October 19	1:00 pm	at Emory & Henry	Fred Selfe Stadium; Emory, VA	W 33–12	5,125
October 26	1:00 pm	Shenandoah^{†}	Everett Stadium; Hampden–Sydney, VA	L 35–36	5,100
November 2	1:00 pm	at Guilford	Armfield Athletic Center; Greensboro, NC	W 52–0	1,800
November 9	1:00 pm	Washington & Lee^{Δ}	Everett Stadium; Hampden–Sydney, VA	W 35–22	3,210
November 16	1:00 pm	at Randolph–Macon	Day Field; Ashland, VA (The Game)	W 28–26	5,567
November 23	12:00 pm	Maryville	Everett Stadium; Hampden–Sydney, VA	W 42–34	1,885
November 30	12:00 pm	at No. 2 Linfield	Maxwell Field; McMinnville, OR	L 21–31	1,974
*Non-conference game; ^{†}Homecoming; ^{Δ}Hall of Fame Game; Rankings from D3football.com poll released prior to the game; All times are in Eastern time

== Ranking movements ==
Ranking movements Legend: ██ Increase in ranking ██ Decrease in ranking — = Not ranked RV = Received votes
	Week												
Poll	Pre	1	2	3	4	5	6	7	8	9	10	11	Final
D3Football.com	—	RV	—	—	—	RV	RV	RV	—	—	RV	RV	18
AFCA Coaches	Not released			RV	RV	RV	—	RV	—	RV	RV	RV	22

== Personnel ==
=== Coaching staff ===
Name	Position	Seasons at Hampden–Sydney	Alma mater
Marty Favret	Head coach	14th	Catholic (1984)
Wes Dodson	Defensive coordinator	7th	Western Michigan (2002)
Zeke Traylor	Offensive Line	6th	Hampden–Sydney (2006)
Nick Goins	Linebackers	2nd	Hanover (2001)
	Tight Ends/H-Backs	1st	Hampden–Sydney (2013)
Scott Riddle	Quarterbacks	2nd	Elon (2011)
Troy Shaffer	Special Teams Coordinator/Wide Receivers	2nd	Bridgewater (1997)
Ahmaad Smith	Defensive Backs	5th	Tennessee State (2006)
Joe Freeland	Defensive Line	2nd	Bridgewater (1980)
Penn Stephenson	Defensive Line/Video Coordinator	1st	Hampden–Sydney (2010)
Reference: 2013 Hampden–Sydney Tigers football coaching staff
