= 2018 Saint John's Johnnies football team =

American college football season

2018 Saint John's Johnnies football

MIAC champion

NCAA Division III Quarterfinal, L 18–21 at Mary Hardin–Baylor
- Conference: Minnesota Intercollegiate Athletic Conference

Ranking
- D3Football.com: No. 3
- Record: 12–1 (8–0 MIAC)
- Head coach: Gary Fasching (6th season)
- Offensive coordinator: Kole Heckendorf (1st season)
- Defensive coordinator: Jerry Haugen (43rd season)
- Home stadium: Clemens Stadium

2018 Minnesota Intercollegiate Athletic Conference football standings
	Conf.			Overall
Team	W		L	W		L
No. 3 Saint John's (MN) $^	8	–	0	12	–	1
No. 7 Bethel (MN) ^	7	–	1	11	–	2
No. 15 St. Thomas (MN)	6	–	2	8	–	2
Gustavus Adolphus	5	–	3	6	–	4
Concordia–Moorhead	4	–	4	5	–	5
St. Olaf	3	–	5	5	–	5
Carleton	2	–	6	3	–	7
Hamline	1	–	7	1	–	9
Augsburg	0	–	8	2	–	8
$ – Conference champion; ^ – NCAA Division III playoff participant; Rankings from D3football.com

The 2018 Saint John's Johnnies football team represented Saint John's University in the 2018 NCAA Division III football season. The Johnnies, led by sixth-year head coach Gary Fasching, were members of the Minnesota Intercollegiate Athletic Conference (MIAC) and played their home games at Clemens Stadium in Collegeville, Minnesota.

== Schedule ==
Saint John's 2018 schedule consists of 6 home and 4 away games in the regular season. The Johnnies hosted UW-Stout, Carleton, St. Thomas, St. Olaf, Hamline, and Thomas More. Away games were at Gustavus Adolphus, Augsburg, Bethel, and Concordia-Moorhead.

The Johnnies hosted their first two playoff games, against Martin Luther and Whitworth. For the playoff quarterfinals, the Johnnies travelled to Belton, Texas to face Mary Hardin–Baylor, where their season ended with a 21–18 loss to the Crusaders.

Date	Time	Opponent	Rank	Site	Result	Attendance	Source
September 1	1:00 p.m.	Wisconsin–Stout*	No. 12	Clemens Stadium; Collegeville, MN	W 27–0	6,882	
September 15	7:00 p.m.	at Gustavus Adolphus	No. 9	Lloyd B. Johnson Field; St. Peter, MN	W 45–13	1,947	
September 22	1:00 p.m.	Carleton^{†}	No. 9	Clemens Stadium; Collegeville, MN	W 59–0	9,153	
September 29	1:00 p.m.	at Augsburg	No. 9	Edor Nelson Field; Minneapolis, MN	W 52–0	669	
October 6	1:00 p.m.	at Bethel	No. 9	Royal Stadium; Arden Hills, MN	W 34–16	6,107	
October 13	1:00 p.m.	No. 3 St. Thomas (MN)	No. 8	Clemens Stadium; Collegeville, MN (Johnnie-Tommie / Tackle Cancer)	W 40–20	16,922	
October 20	1:00 p.m.	St. Olaf	No. 5	Clemens Stadium; Collegeville, MN	W 57–7	5,473	
October 27	1:00 p.m.	at Concordia-Moorhead	No. 4	Jake Christiansen Stadium; Moorhead, MN	W 42–14	3,845	
November 3	1:00 p.m.	Hamline	No. 4	Clemens Stadium; Collegeville, MN	W 51–0	3,292	
November 10	1:00 p.m.	Thomas More*	No. 4	Clemens Stadium; Collegeville, MN	W 63–23	3,127	
November 17	12:00 p.m.	Martin Luther*	No. 3	Clemens Stadium; Collegeville, MN (NCAA Division III First Round)	W 84–6	1,103	
November 24	12:00 p.m.	No. 10 Whitworth*	No. 3	Clemens Stadium; Collegeville, MN (NCAA Division III Second Round)	W 45–24	1,345	
December 1	12:00 p.m.	at No. 2 Mary Hardin–Baylor*	No. 3	Crusader Stadium; Belton, TX (NCAA Division III Quarterfinal)	L 18–21	2,819	
*Non-conference game; ^{†}Homecoming; Rankings from D3Football.com Poll released prior to the game; All times are in Central time; Source:

== Rankings ==
Ranking movements Legend: ██ Increase in ranking ██ Decrease in ranking
	Week												
Poll	Pre	1	2	3	4	5	6	7	8	9	10	11	Final
D3football.com	11	11	9	9	9	9	8	5	4	4	4	3	4
AFCA	Not released			10	10	9	7	5	5	5	5	5	4
