= Norman Johansen =

American football player, coach, and athletic director (1914–2009)

Biographical details
- Born: March 9, 1914; Clinton, Iowa, U.S.
- Died: May 4, 2009 (aged 95); Mesa, Arizona, U.S.

Playing career
- 1941: Northern Iowa

Coaching career (HC unless noted)
- 1952–1962: Wartburg

Administrative career (AD unless noted)
- 1970–1974: Northern Arizona

Head coaching record
- Overall: 53–54–4

Norman Johansen (March 9, 1914 – May 4, 2009) was an American football player, coach, and athletic director. He served as the head football coach at Wartburg College in Waverly, Iowa from 1952 to 1964, compiling a record of 53–54–4. Johansen was the athletic director at Northern Arizona University in Flagstaff, Arizona from 1970 to 1974.
