= 2018 Mount Union Purple Raiders football team =

American college football season

2018 Mount Union Purple Raiders football

OAC champion

Stagg Bowl, L 16–24 vs. Mary Hardin–Baylor
- Conference: Ohio Athletic Conference

Ranking
- D3Football.com: No. 2
- Record: 14–1 (9–0 OAC)
- Head coach: Vince Kehres (6th season)
- Offensive coordinator: Chris Kappas (2nd season)
- Home stadium: Mount Union Stadium

2018 Ohio Athletic Conference football standings
	Conf.			Overall
Team	W		L	W		L
No. 2 Mount Union $^	9	–	0	14	–	1
No. 20 John Carroll ^	8	–	1	9	–	2
Baldwin Wallace	7	–	2	8	–	2
Marietta	6	–	3	7	–	3
Heidelberg	4	–	5	5	–	5
Ohio Northern	4	–	5	5	–	5
Muskingum	3	–	6	4	–	6
Capital	3	–	6	3	–	7
Otterbein	1	–	8	2	–	8
Wilmington (OH)	0	–	9	1	–	9
$ – Conference champion; ^ – NCAA Division III playoff participant; Rankings from D3football.com

The 2018 Mount Union Purple Raiders football team represented the University of Mount Union in the 2018 NCAA Division III football season. The Purple Raiders, were led by sixth-year head coach Vince Kehres, were members of the Ohio Athletic Conference (OAC) and played their home games at Mount Union Stadium in Alliance, Ohio.

== Schedule ==
Mount Union's 2018 schedule consists of 5 home, and 5 away games in the regular season. The Purple Raiders will host Rose–Hulman, John Caroll, Wilmington College, Heidelberg University, and Marietta College and will travel to Baldwin Wallace, Otterbein University, Capital University, Ohio Northern, and Muskingum University.

Mount Union will have one non–conference game against the Rose–Hulman Institute of Technology from the Heartland Collegiate Athletic Conference.

In 2017, Mount Union won the Stagg Bowl after winning against the University of Mary Hardin–Baylor 12–0. The team finished with a 15–0 record, with a 9–0 record in conference play. The Purple Raiders failed to win the national championship again after winning it last year, by losing 16–24 in a rematch with Mary Hardin–Baylor in the Stagg Bowl.

Date	Time	Opponent	Rank	Site	Result	Attendance
September 1	7:00 p.m.	Rose–Hulman*	No. 1	Mount Union Stadium; Alliance, OH	W 54–0	3,876
September 15	2:00 p.m.	at Baldwin Wallace	No. 1	Finnie Stadium; Berea, OH	W 56–21	7,647
September 22	1:30 p.m.	No. 15 John Carroll	No. 1	Mount Union Stadium; Alliance, OH	W 23–10	5,866
September 29	1:30 p.m.	at Otterbein	No. 1	Memorial Stadium; Westerville, OH	W 56–14	1,874
October 6	1:30 p.m.	Wilmington	No. 1	Mount Union Stadium; Alliance, OH	W 63–7	1,846
October 13	1:30 p.m.	at Capital	No. 1	Bernlohr Stadium; Bexley, OH	W 77–3	1,874
October 20	1:30 p.m.	Heidelberg	No. 1	Mount Union Stadium; Alliance, OH	W 54–0	1,537
October 27	1:30 p.m.	at Ohio Northern	No. 1	Dial–Roberson Stadium; Ada, OH	W 55–24	2,846
November 3	1:30 p.m.	at Muskingum	No. 1	McConagha Stadium; New Concord, OH	W 52–10	865
November 10	1:30 p.m.	Marietta	No. 1	Mount Union Stadium; Alliance, OH	W 49–7	1,433
November 17	12:00 p.m.	Denison*	No. 1	Mount Union Stadium; Alliance, OH (NCAA Division III First Round)	W 60–0	1,846
November 24	12:00 p.m.	No. 24 Centre*	No. 1	Mount Union Stadium; Alliance, OH (NCAA Division III Second Round)	W 51–35	1,211
December 1	12:00 p.m.	No. 23 Muhlenberg*	No. 1	Mount Union Stadium; Alliance, OH (NCAA Division III Quarterfinal)	W 38–10	1,157
December 8	12:00 p.m.	No. 14 Johns Hopkins*	No. 1	Mount Union Stadium; Alliance, OH (NCAA Division III Semifinal)	W 28–20	1,753
December 14	7:00 p.m.	vs. No. 2 Mary Hardin–Baylor*	No. 1	Woodforest Bank Stadium; Shenandoah, TX (Stagg Bowl XLVI)	L 16–24	6,816
*Non-conference game; Rankings from D3football.com Poll released prior to the game; All times are in Eastern time
