= Lee Bondhus =

American football player and coach (1939–2010)

Biographical details
- Born: April 14, 1939; Storden, Minnesota, U.S.
- Died: December 12, 2010 (aged 71); Sioux Falls, South Dakota, U.S.

Playing career
- 1957–1960: South Dakota State
- 1961: Grand Rapids Shamrocks
- Position: Offensive guard

Coaching career (HC unless noted)
- 1965–1972: Wartburg

Head coaching record
- Overall: 24–47–1

Accomplishments and honors

Championships
- 1 Iowa Conference (1968)

Awards
- Iowa Conference Coach of the Year (1968)

Leland Mark Bondhus (April 14, 1939 – December 12, 2010) was an American football player and coach. He played college football at South Dakota State University and was drafted in 1961 by the Green Bay Packers. Bondhus served as the head football coach at Wartburg College in Waverly, Iowa from 1965 to 1972, compiling a record o 24–47–1 and guiding the Knights capture the Iowa Intercollegiate Athletic Conference (IIAC) title in 1968.

== Head coaching record ==
Year	Team	Overall	Conference	Standing	Bowl/playoffs
Wartburg Knights (Iowa Conference) (1965–1972)
1965	Wartburg	2–7	1–6	7th	
1966	Wartburg	1–8	1–6	7th	
1967	Wartburg	1–8	1–6	8th	
1968	Wartburg	7–1–1	6–0–1	1st	
1969	Wartburg	3–6	3–4	T–5th	
1970	Wartburg	3–6	3–4	5th	
1971	Wartburg	4–5	3–4	6th	
1972	Wartburg	3–6	1–6	8th	
Wartburg:		24–47–1	19–36–1		
Total:		24–47–1			
National championship Conference title Conference division title or championship game berth
