= 2018 Case Western Reserve Spartans football team =

American college football season

2018 Case Western Reserve Spartans football
- Conference: Presidents' Athletic Conference
- Record: 8–2 (7–2 PAC)
- Head coach: Greg Debeljak
- Home stadium: DiSanto Field

2018 Presidents' Athletic Conference football standings
	Conf.			Overall
Team	W		L	W		L
Washington & Jefferson $^	8	–	1	9	–	2
Case Western Reserve	7	–	2	8	–	2
Westminster (PA)	7	–	2	7	–	4
Grove City	6	–	3	8	–	3
Carnegie Mellon	5	–	4	6	–	4
Bethany (WV)	5	–	4	5	–	5
Waynesburg	4	–	5	4	–	6
Geneva	2	–	7	2	–	8
Saint Vincent	1	–	8	1	–	9
Thiel	0	–	9	0	–	10
$ – Conference champion; ^ – NCAA Division III playoff participant

The 2018 Case Western Reserve Spartans football team represented Case Western Reserve University as a member of the Presidents' Athletic Conference (PAC) during the 2018 NCAA Division III football season. The team was coached by 15th-year coach Greg Debeljak and played its home games at DiSanto Field in Cleveland.

== Schedule ==
Date	Time	Opponent	Site	Result	Attendance	Source
September 1	7:00 pm	Rochester*	DiSanto Field; Cleveland, OH	W 38–10	1,897	
September 15	7:00 pm	at Grove City	Robert E. Thorn Field; Grove City, PA	W 49–23	4,100	
September 22	7:00 pm	Thiel	DiSanto Field; Cleveland, OH	W 63–20	1,657	
September 29	7:00 pm	at Westminster (PA)	Harold Burry Stadium; New Wilmington, PA	W 35–14	1,172	
October 6	1:00 pm	at No. 12 Washington & Jefferson	Cameron Stadium; Washington, PA	L 36–44	2,609	
October 13	1:00 pm	Saint Vincent^{†}	DiSanto Field; Cleveland, OH	W 37–7	1,472	
October 20	7:00 pm	at Geneva	Reeves Field; Geneva, PA	W 27–14	1,200	
October 27	2:00 pm	at Bethany (WV)	Bison Stadium; Bethany, WV	W 34–3	250	
November 3	2:00 pm	Waynesburg	DiSanto Field; Cleveland, OH	W 41–17	1,741	
November 10	2:00 pm	Carnegie Mellon	DiSanto Field; Cleveland, OH (Academic Bowl)	L 23–29	1,762	
*Non-conference game; ^{†}Homecoming; Rankings from D3Football.com Poll released prior to the game; All times are in Eastern time
