= 2018 Wartburg Knights football team =

American college football season

2018 Wartburg Knights football

ARC champion

NCAA Division III First Round, L 14–41 at Bethel (MN)
- Conference: American Rivers Conference
- Record: 8–3 (7–1 ARC)
- Head coach: Rick Willis (20th season)
- Offensive coordinator: Matt Wheeler (9th season)
- Defensive coordinator: Chris Winter (8th season)
- Home stadium: Walston-Hoover Stadium

2018 American Rivers Conference football standings
| | Conf. | | | Overall |
| Team | W | | L | W | | L |
|---|---|---|---|---|---|---|
| Wartburg $^ | 7 | – | 1 | 8 | – | 3 |
| Central (IA) | 6 | – | 2 | 8 | – | 2 |
| Dubuque | 6 | – | 2 | 7 | – | 3 |
| Simpson (IA) | 6 | – | 2 | 7 | – | 3 |
| Coe | 5 | – | 3 | 6 | – | 4 |
| Loras | 3 | – | 5 | 4 | – | 6 |
| Nebraska Wesleyan | 2 | – | 6 | 3 | – | 7 |
| Luther | 1 | – | 7 | 1 | – | 9 |
| Buena Vista | 1 | – | 9 | 0 | – | 8 |
$ – Conference champion; ^ – NCAA Division III playoff participant

The 2018 Wartburg Knights football team represented Wartburg College as a member of the American Rivers Conference (ARC) during the 2018 NCAA Division III football season. Led by Rick Willis in his 20th season as head, the Knights compiled an overall record of 8–3 with a mark of 7–1 in conference play, winning ARC title for the second year in a row and earning an automatic bid to the NCAA Division III Football Championship playoffs. This was the 16th conference title for Wartburg and 10th for head coach Rick Willis. Wartburg lost in the first round of the playoffs to the Bethel Royals. The team played home games at Walston-Hoover Stadium in Waverly, Iowa.

== Schedule ==
Wartburg's 2018 regular season scheduled consisted of five home and five away games.

| Date | Time | Opponent | Rank | Site | Result | Attendance |
|---|---|---|---|---|---|---|
| September 1 | 7:00 p.m. | Greenville* | No. 13 | Walston-Hoover Stadium; Waverly, IA | W 73–13 | 1,832 |
| September 8 | 1:00 p.m. | at Monmouth (IL)* | No. 13 | Zorn Stadium; Monmouth, IL | L 18–24 | 1,700 |
| September 15 | 1:00 p.m. | Buena Vista | | Walston-Hoover Stadium; Waverly, IA | W 63–0 | 1,642 |
| September 22 | 1:00 p.m. | at Nebraska Wesleyan | | Abel Stadium; Lincoln, NE | W 42–14 | 971 |
| September 29 | 1:00 p.m. | Simpson | | Walston-Hoover Stadium; Waverly, IA | L 36–37 ^{OT} | 1,927 |
| October 13 | 1:00 p.m. | at Coe | | Clark Field; Cedar Rapids, IA | W 31–19 | 1,373 |
| October 20 | 1:30 p.m. | No. 20 Central (IA)^{†} | | Walston-Hoover Stadium; Waverly, IA | W 47–20 | 3,229 |
| October 27 | 1:00 p.m. | at Loras | | Rock Bowl; Dubuque, IA | W 56–14 | 1,725 |
| November 3 | 1:00 p.m. | Luther | | Walston-Hoover Stadium; Waverly, IA | W 43–7 | 3,000 |
| November 10 | 1:00 p.m. | at Dubuque | | Chalmers Field; Dubuque, IA | W 47–28 | 4,210 |
| November 23 | 12:00 p.m. | at No. 11 Bethel (MN)* | | Royal Stadium; Arden Hills, MN (NCAA Division III First Round) | L 14–41 | 6,107 |
*Non-conference game; ^{†}Homecoming; Rankings from D3Football.com Poll released prior to the game; All times are in Central time

== Awards and honors ==
Individual awards
| Player | Award |
|---|---|
| Matt Sacia | Gagliardi Trophy Finalist; ARC Offensive Player of the year D3football.com Honorable Mention All-American |
| Dillon Rademaker | D3football.com First-team All-American |

All-Conference
| Player | Position | Team | Year |
|---|---|---|---|
| JoJo McNair | DB | 1 | So |
| Dillon Rademaker | DL | 1 | SR |
| Connor Frerichs | LB | 1 | SR |
| Matt Sacia | QB | 1 | SR |
| Nic Vetter | OL | 1 | SR |
| Hud Johnston | OL | 1 | SR |
| Cedric Dobbins | DB | 2 | JR |
| Marcus Johnson | LB | 2 | SR |
| Jason Fisher | DL | 2 | JR |
| Kolin Schulte | WR | 2 | JR |
| JoJo McNair | WR | 2 | So |
| Tyler Schager | OL | 2 | Sr |
| JoJo McNair | RS | HM | So |
HM = Honorable mention. Reference:
