= 2013 Wartburg Knights football team =

American college football season

2013 Wartburg Knights football

IIAC champion

NCAA Division III Second Round, L 27–34 at Bethel (MN)
- Conference: Iowa Intercollegiate Athletic Conference

Ranking
- AFCA: No. 17
- D3Football.com: No. 15
- Record: 9–3 (6–1 IIAC)
- Head coach: Rick Willis (15th season)
- Offensive coordinator: Matt Wheeler (4th season)
- Defensive coordinator: Chris Winter (3rd season)
- Home stadium: Walston-Hoover Stadium

2013 Iowa Intercollegiate Athletic Conference football standings
	Conf.			Overall
Team	W		L	W		L
No. 15 Wartburg $^	6	–	1	9	–	3
Simpson (IA)	5	–	2	7	–	3
Coe	4	–	3	7	–	3
Central (IA)	4	–	3	6	–	4
Dubuque	4	–	3	5	–	5
Buena Vista	4	–	3	4	–	6
Luther	1	–	6	2	–	8
Loras	0	–	7	1	–	9
$ – Conference champion; ^ – NCAA Division III playoff participant; Rankings from D3football.com

The 2013 Wartburg Knights football team represented Wartburg College as a member of the Iowa Intercollegiate Athletic Conference (IIAC) during the 2013 NCAA Division III football season. Led by Rick Willis in his 15th season as head coach, the Knights compiled an overall record of 9–3 with a mark of 6–1 in conference play, winning the IIAC for the 13th time and first since 2010. The win title earned them an automatic bid to the NCAA Division III Football Championship playoffs. Wartburg lost in the second round of the playoffs to Bethel (MN). The team played home games at Walston-Hoover Stadium in Waverly, Iowa.

== Schedule ==
Wartburg's 2013 regular season scheduled consisted of five home and five away games.

Date	Time	Opponent	Site	Result	Attendance
September 7	1:00 p.m.	at MacMurry*	Freesen Field; Jacksonville, Il	W 58–7	1,200
September 12	1:00 p.m.	at No. 8 Bethel (MN)*	Royal Stadium; Arden Hills, MN	L 17–30	2,346
September 21	1:00 p.m.	Carthage*	Walston-Hoover Stadium; Waverly, IA	W 27–10	3,000
October 5	1:00 p.m.	Simpson	Walston-Hoover Stadium; Waverly, IA	W 34–24	2,100
October 12	1:30 p.m.	Buena Vista^{†}	Walston-Hoover Stadium; Waverly, IA	W 37–29	4,500
October 19	1:00 p.m.	at Luther	Carlson Stadium; Decorah, IA	W 24–21	865
October 26	1:00 p.m.	at Dubuque	Chalmers Field; Dubuque, IA	W 22–15	2,988
November 2	1:00 p.m.	Coe	Walston-Hoover Stadium; Waverly, IA	L 10–24	3,400
November 9	1:30 p.m.	Central (IA)	Walston-Hoover Stadium; Waverly, IA	W 16–14	3,101
November 16	1:00 p.m.	at Loras	Rock Bowl; Dubuque, IA	W 49–34	2,500
November 23	12:00 p.m.	at No. 14 Illinois Wesleyan*	Tucci Stadium; Bloomington, IL (NCAA Division III First Round)	W 41–7	1,000
November 30	12:00 p.m.	at No. 6 Bethel (MN)*	Royal Stadium; Arden Hills, MN (NCAA Division III Second Round)	L 27–34	3,145
*Non-conference game; ^{†}Homecoming; Rankings from D3Football.com Poll released prior to the game; All times are in Central time
