= 2010 Wartburg Knights football team =

American college football season

2010 Wartburg Knights football

IIAC champion

NCAA Division III First Round, L 20–28 vs. Bethel (MN)
- Conference: Iowa Intercollegiate Athletic Conference

Ranking
- AFCA: No. 11
- D3Football.com: No. 12
- Record: 10–1 (8–0 IIAC)
- Head coach: Rick Willis (12th season)
- Offensive coordinator: Matt Wheeler (1st season)
- Defensive coordinator: Joel Dettwiler (3rd season)
- Home stadium: Walston-Hoover Stadium

2010 Iowa Intercollegiate Athletic Conference football standings
	Conf.			Overall
Team	W		L	W		L
No. 12 Wartburg $^	8	–	0	10	–	1
No. 14 Coe ^	7	–	1	9	–	2
Central (IA)	6	–	2	8	–	2
Loras	4	–	4	5	–	5
Luther	4	–	4	5	–	5
Dubuque	3	–	5	4	–	6
Buena Vista	2	–	6	3	–	7
Simpson (IA)	2	–	6	2	–	8
Cornell (IA)	0	–	8	0	–	10
$ – Conference champion; ^ – NCAA Division III playoff participant; Rankings from D3football.com

The 2010 Wartburg Knights football team represented Wartburg College as a member of the Iowa Intercollegiate Athletic Conference (IIAC) during the 2010 NCAA Division III football season. Led by Rick Willis in his 12th season as head coach, the Knights began the season with high hopes to return to the top of the conference with a veteran team. The Knights compiled an overall record of 10–1 with a mark of 8–0 in conference play, finishing atop the IIAC for the 12th time and completing their first undefeated regular season since 2003. They earned the conference's automatic bid to the NCAA Division III Football Championship playoffs, losing at home to the eventual national semifinalist Bethel Royal in the first round. During the season head coach Rick Willis earned his 100th career coaching victory with a win against Buena Vista. The team played home games at Walston-Hoover Stadium in Waverly, Iowa.

== Schedule ==
Wartburg's 2010 regular season scheduled consisted of five home and five away games.

Date	Time	Opponent	Rank	Site	Result	Attendance
September 3	7:00 p.m.	No. 17 Monmouth (IL)*		Walston-Hoover Stadium; Waverly, IA	W 35–28	4,150
September 10	1:00 p.m.	at Gustavus Adolphus*		Hollingsworth Field; St. Peter, MN	W 27–6	3,223
September 18	1:00 p.m.	Cornell (IA)		Walston-Hoover Stadium; Waverly, IA	W 34–14	2,000
September 25	1:00 p.m.	Loras		Walston-Hoover Stadium; Waverly, IA	W 34–0	2,123
October 9	1:00 p.m.	at Buena Vista		J. Leslie Rollins Stadium; Storm Lake, IA	W 28–0	4,215
October 16	1:00 p.m.	at No. 6 Coe		Clark Field; Cedar Rapids, IA	W 31–21	5,189
October 23	1:30 p.m.	Dubuque^{†}	No. 13	Walston-Hoover Stadium; Waverly, IA	W 55–17	3,115
October 30	1:00 p.m.	Luther	No. 13	Walston-Hoover Stadium; Waverly, IA	W 24–18	3,057
November 6	1:00 p.m.	at No. 17 Central (IA)	No. 13	Schipper Stadium; Pella, IA	W 20–17	3,000
November 13	1:00 p.m.	at Simpson	No. 13	Buxton Stadium; Indianola, IA	W 27–14	423
November 19	2:00 p.m.	No. 14 Bethel (MN)*	No. 11	Walston-Hoover Stadium; Waverly, IA (NCAA Division III First Round)	L 20–28	3,100
*Non-conference game; ^{†}Homecoming; Rankings from D3Football.com Poll released prior to the game; All times are in Central time
