= Berry Vikings football =

College football team

2025 Berry Vikings football team
- First season: 2013; 13 years ago
- Athletic director: Angel Mason
- Head coach: Tony Kunczewski; 13th season, 93–39 (.705)
- Location: Mount Berry, Georgia
- Stadium: Valhalla Stadium (capacity: 2,500)
- Field: Williams Field
- NCAA division: Division III
- Conference: SAA
- Division: NCAA Division III, Southern Athletic Association
- Colors: Navy and silver
- All-time record: 93–39 (.705)

Conference championships
- 6
- Mascot: Vikings
- Website: berryvikings.com/football

The Berry Vikings football team represents Berry College in college football at the NCAA Division III level. The Vikings are members of the Southern Athletic Association (SAA), fielding its team in the SAA since 2013. The Vikings play their home games at the Valhalla Stadium in Mount Berry, Georgia.

Their head coach is Tony Kunczewski, who took over the position for the 2013 season.

== Conference affiliations ==
- Southern Athletic Association (2013–present)

== List of head coaches ==
=== Key ===
Key to symbols in coaches list
General		Overall		Conference		Postseason (Note: Although the first Rose Bowl Game was played in 1902, it has been continuously played since the 1916 game, and is recognized as the oldest bowl game by the NCAA. "—" indicates any season prior to 1916 when postseason games were not played.)	
No.	Order of coaches (Note: A running total of the number of head coaches, with coaches who served separate tenures being counted only once. Interim head coaches are represented with "Int" and are not counted in the running total. "—" indicates the team played but either without a coach or no coach is on record. "X" indicates an interim year without play.)	GC	Games coached	CW	Conference wins	PW	Postseason wins
DC	Division championships	OW	Overall wins	CL	Conference losses	PL	Postseason losses
CC	Conference championships	OL	Overall losses	CT	Conference ties	PT	Postseason ties
NC	National championships	OT	Overall ties (Note: Overtime rules in college football were introduced in 1996, making ties impossible in the period since.)	C%	Conference winning percentage		
†	Elected to the College Football Hall of Fame	O%	Overall winning percentage (Note: When computing the win–loss percentage, a tie counts as half a win and half a loss.)				

=== Coaches ===
List of head football coaches showing season(s) coached, overall records, conference records, postseason records, championships and selected awards
No.	Name	Season(s)	GC	OW	OL	OT	O%	CW	CL	CT	C%	PW	PL	PT	DC	CC	NC	Awards
1	Tony Kunczewski	2013–present	131	93	38	0	0.710	69	24	0	0.742	4	5	0	–	6	–	SAA Coach of the Year (2016–2018, 2020)

== Year-by-year results ==
National champions	Conference champions	Bowl game berth	Playoff berth

Season	Year	Head Coach	Association	Division	Conference	Record							Postseason	Final ranking
Season	Year	Head Coach	Association	Division	Conference	Overall			Conference				Postseason	Final ranking
Season	Year	Head Coach	Association	Division	Conference	Win	Loss	Tie	Finish	Win	Loss	Tie	Postseason	Final ranking
Berry Vikings
2013	2013	Tony Kunczewski	NCAA	Division III	SAA	0	9	0	7th	0	6	0	—	—
2014	2014	Tony Kunczewski	NCAA	Division III	SAA	2	8	0	T–6th	1	5	0	—	—
2015	2015	Tony Kunczewski	NCAA	Division III	SAA	7	3	0	T–2nd	6	2	0	—	—
2016	2016	Tony Kunczewski	NCAA	Division III	SAA	9	1	0	T–1st	7	1	0	SAA co-champions	—
2017	2017	Tony Kunczewski	NCAA	Division III	SAA	11	1	0	1st	8	0	0	L NCAA Division III Second Round	15
2018	2018	Tony Kunczewski	NCAA	Division III	SAA	10	2	0	T–1st	7	2	0	L NCAA Division III Second Round	17
2019	2019	Tony Kunczewski	NCAA	Division III	SAA	9	2	0	T–1st	7	1	0	L NCAA Division III First Round	—
2020–21	2020–21	Tony Kunczewski	NCAA	Division III	SAA	4	0	0	1st	4	0	0	SAA champion	—
2021	2021	Tony Kunczewski	NCAA	Division III	SAA	6	4	0	4th	4	3	0	—	—
2022	2022	Tony Kunczewski	NCAA	Division III	SAA	7	3	0	T–2nd	5	2	0	—	—
2023	2023	Tony Kunczewski	NCAA	Division III	SAA	9	1	0	2nd	7	1	0	—	—
2024	2024	Tony Kunczewski	NCAA	Division III	SAA	8	3	0	T–1st	6	1	0	L NCAA Division III First Round	—
2025	2025	Tony Kunczewski	NCAA	Division III	SAA	11	2	0	1st	7	0	0	L NCAA Division III Quarterfinals	9th
