= Wes Dodson =

American football coach (born c. 1978)

Current position
- Title: Head coach
- Team: LaGrange
- Conference: USA South
- Record: 16–15

Biographical details
- Born: c. 1978 (age 47–48); Nappanee, Indiana, U.S.
- Education: Western Michigan University (2002)

Playing career
- 1997–2001: Western Michigan
- Position: Safety

Coaching career (HC unless noted)
- 2002–2004: Western Michigan (GA)
- 2005–2006: William & Mary (def. assistant)
- 2007: Hampden–Sydney (assistant)
- 2008–2022: Hampden–Sydney (DC)
- 2023–present: LaGrange

Head coaching record
- Overall: 16–15
- Tournaments: 1–1 (NCAA D-III playoffs)

Accomplishments and honors

Championships
- 1 USA South (2025)

Wes Dodson (born c. 1978) is an American college football coach. He is the head football coach for LaGrange College, a position he has held since 2023. He also coached for Western Michigan, William & Mary, and Hampden–Sydney. He played college football for Western Michigan as a safety.

== Head coaching record ==
Year	Team	Overall	Conference	Standing	Bowl/playoffs
LaGrange Panthers (USA South Athletic Conference) (2023–present)
2023	LaGrange	0–9	0–7	9th	
2024	LaGrange	6–4	6–2	2nd	
2025	LaGrange	10–2	7–0	1st	L NCAA Division III Second Round
2026	LaGrange	0–0	0–0		
LaGrange:		16–15	13–9		
Total:		16–15			
