= 2013 NCAA Division III football season =

American college football season

- Regular season: August 31 – November 16, 2013
- Playoffs: November 23 – December 20, 2013
- National championship: Salem Football Stadium; Salem, VA
- Champion: Wisconsin–Whitewater (5)
- Gagliardi Trophy: Kevin Burke, Mount Union (QB)

The 2013 NCAA Division III football season, part of college football in the United States organized by the National Collegiate Athletic Association at the Division III level, began on August 31, 2013, and concluded with the National Championship Game of the NCAA Division III Football Championship on December 20, 2013, at Salem Football Stadium in Salem, Virginia. This was the twenty-first consecutive title game held in Salem. The Wisconsin–Whitewater Warhawks defeated the Mount Union Purple Raiders, 52–14, to win their fifth national title.

The 2013 Gagliardi Trophy was awarded to quarterback Kevin Burke from Mount Union.

== Conference changes and new programs ==
School	2012 conference	2013 conference
Alfred State	None (NJCAA)	Independent
Iowa Wesleyan	NAIA independent	Independent
Presentation	UMAC (Division III)	North Star (NAIA)
Southern Virginia	NAIA independent	Independent
Berry	Program established	Southern Athletic Association

== Conference standings ==
2013 American Southwest Conference football standings
	Conf.			Overall
Team	W		L	W		L
No. 2 Mary Hardin–Baylor $^	6	–	0	13	–	1
Louisiana College	5	–	1	7	–	3
Mississippi College #	4	–	2	4	–	6
Hardin–Simmons	2	–	4	4	–	6
Howard Payne	2	–	4	4	–	6
East Texas Baptist	1	–	5	3	–	7
Sul Ross	1	–	5	1	–	9
$ – Conference champion; ^ – NCAA Division III playoff participant; # – Transitioning to NCAA Division II; Rankings from D3football.com

2013 Centennial Conference football standings
	Conf.			Overall
Team	W		L	W		L
No. 12 Johns Hopkins $^	9	–	0	10	–	1
Muhlenberg	7	–	2	8	–	3
Ursinus	6	–	3	7	–	3
Franklin & Marshall	6	–	3	7	–	4
Juniata	6	–	3	7	–	4
Gettysburg	3	–	6	4	–	6
Dickinson	3	–	6	3	–	7
McDaniel	2	–	7	2	–	8
Moravian	2	–	7	2	–	8
Susquehanna	1	–	8	1	–	9
$ – Conference champion; ^ – NCAA Division III playoff participant; Rankings from D3football.com

2013 College Conference of Illinois and Wisconsin football standings
	Conf.			Overall
Team	W		L	W		L
No. 5 North Central (IL) $^	7	–	0	13	–	1
No. 24 Illinois Wesleyan ^	6	–	1	9	–	2
Wheaton (IL)	5	–	2	8	–	2
Augustana (IL)	3	–	4	5	–	5
Elmhurst	3	–	4	4	–	6
North Park	3	–	4	3	–	7
Millikin	1	–	6	2	–	8
Carthage	0	–	7	1	–	9
$ – Conference champion; ^ – NCAA Division III playoff participant; Rankings from D3football.com

2013 Eastern Collegiate Football Conference standings
	Conf.			Overall
Team	W		L	W		L
Gallaudet +^	6	–	1	9	–	2
Norwich +	6	–	1	7	–	4
SUNY Maritime	5	–	2	5	–	5
Husson	4	–	3	5	–	5
Mount Ida	4	–	3	5	–	5
Becker	2	–	5	3	–	7
Anna Maria	1	–	6	2	–	8
Castleton	0	–	7	1	–	9
+ – Conference co-champions; ^ – NCAA Division III playoff participant

2013 Empire 8 Athletic Conference football standings
	Conf.			Overall
Team	W		L	W		L
No. 16 Ithaca $^	6	–	1	9	–	3
No. 8 St. John Fisher ^	5	–	2	10	–	3
Alfred	5	–	2	8	–	3
Salisbury	5	–	2	7	–	4
Hartwick	3	–	4	6	–	4
Buffalo State	3	–	4	5	–	5
Utica	1	–	6	3	–	7
Frostburg State	0	–	7	1	–	9
$ – Conference champion; ^ – NCAA Division III playoff participant; Rankings from D3football.com

2013 Heartland Collegiate Athletic Conference football standings
	Conf.			Overall
Team	W		L	W		L
Rose–Hulman +	7	–	1	7	–	3
No. 19 Franklin (IN) +^	7	–	1	8	–	4
Mount St. Joseph	6	–	2	6	–	4
Hanover	5	–	3	5	–	5
Bluffton	4	–	4	4	–	6
Defiance	3	–	5	3	–	7
Manchester	3	–	5	3	–	7
Earlham	1	–	7	2	–	8
Anderson (IN)	0	–	8	0	–	10
$ – Conference champion; ^ – NCAA Division III playoff participant; Rankings from D3football.com

2013 Iowa Intercollegiate Athletic Conference football standings
	Conf.			Overall
Team	W		L	W		L
No. 15 Wartburg $^	6	–	1	9	–	3
Simpson (IA)	5	–	2	7	–	3
Coe	4	–	3	7	–	3
Central (IA)	4	–	3	6	–	4
Dubuque	4	–	3	5	–	5
Buena Vista	4	–	3	4	–	6
Luther	1	–	6	2	–	8
Loras	0	–	7	1	–	9
$ – Conference champion; ^ – NCAA Division III playoff participant; Rankings from D3football.com

2013 Liberty League football standings
	Conf.			Overall
Team	W		L	W		L
No. 14 Hobart $^	7	–	0	10	–	1
St. Lawrence	5	–	2	7	–	3
Springfield	3	–	3	7	–	3
Rochester (NY)	3	–	3	5	–	4
Union (NY)	3	–	4	3	–	7
RPI	2	–	5	5	–	5
WPI	2	–	5	3	–	7
Merchant Marine	1	–	4	4	–	4
$ – Conference champion; ^ – NCAA Division III playoff participant; Rankings from D3football.com

2013 Massachusetts State Collegiate Athletic Conference football standings
	Conf.			Overall
Team	W		L	W		L
Framingham State $^	8	–	0	9	–	2
Western Connecticut	6	–	2	8	–	2
Bridgewater State	5	–	3	6	–	4
Fitchburg State	5	–	3	6	–	4
Westfield State	4	–	4	5	–	5
Massachusetts Maritime	3	–	5	5	–	5
UMass Dartmouth	3	–	5	3	–	6
Worcester State	1	–	7	3	–	7
Plymouth State	1	–	7	2	–	8
$ – Conference champion; ^ – NCAA Division III playoff participant

2013 Michigan Intercollegiate Athletic Association football standings
	Conf.			Overall
Team	W		L	W		L
Albion $^	6	–	0	8	–	3
Hope	4	–	2	7	–	3
Kalamazoo	4	–	2	6	–	4
Adrian	3	–	3	6	–	4
Olivet	2	–	4	6	–	4
Trine	1	–	5	4	–	6
Alma	1	–	5	1	–	9
$ – Conference champion; ^ – NCAA Division III playoff participant

2013 Middle Atlantic Conference football standings
	Conf.			Overall
Team	W		L	W		L
Lebanon Valley +^	7	–	2	8	–	3
Lycoming +	7	–	2	7	–	3
Albright	6	–	3	8	–	3
Delaware Valley	6	–	3	7	–	4
King's	6	–	3	6	–	4
Widener	6	–	3	6	–	4
Stevenson	3	–	6	4	–	6
Wilkes	3	–	6	4	–	6
Misericordia	1	–	8	1	–	9
FDU Florham	0	–	9	1	–	9
+ – Conference co-champions; ^ – NCAA Division III playoff participant; Rankings from D3football.com

2013 Midwest Conference football standings
	Conf.			Overall
Team	W		L	W		L
St. Norbert $^	8	–	1	8	–	3
Illinois College	7	–	2	8	–	2
Lake Forest	7	–	2	8	–	2
Cornell (IA)	7	–	2	7	–	3
Ripon	6	–	3	7	–	3
Carroll (WI)	5	–	4	6	–	4
Monmouth (IL)	5	–	4	5	–	5
Grinnell	2	–	7	2	–	8
Beloit	1	–	8	1	–	9
Knox	1	–	8	1	–	9
Lawrence	1	–	9	1	–	9
$ – Conference champion; ^ – NCAA Division III playoff participant

2013 Minnesota Intercollegiate Athletic Conference football standings
	Conf.			Overall
Team	W		L	W		L
No. 6 Bethel (MN) $^	8	–	0	12	–	1
Concordia–Moorhead	6	–	2	8	–	2
No. 20 St. Thomas (MN)	6	–	2	8	–	2
Saint John's (MN)	5	–	3	7	–	3
Gustavus Adolphus	4	–	4	6	–	4
Augsburg	3	–	5	5	–	5
Carleton	3	–	5	5	–	5
Hamline	1	–	7	2	–	8
St. Olaf	0	–	8	1	–	9
$ – Conference champion; ^ – NCAA Division III playoff participant; Rankings from D3football.com

2013 New England Football Conference standings
	Conf.			Overall
Team	W		L	W		L
Endicott $^	7	–	0	8	–	3
Salve Regina	6	–	1	7	–	4
MIT	4	–	3	6	–	3
Curry	4	–	3	5	–	5
Western New England	3	–	4	4	–	6
Coast Guard	3	–	4	3	–	7
Maine Maritime	1	–	6	1	–	8
Nichols	0	–	7	1	–	8
$ – Conference champion; ^ – NCAA Division III playoff participant

2013 New England Small College Athletic Conference football standings
	Conf.			Overall
Team	W		L	W		L
Amherst +	7	–	1	7	–	1
Middlebury +	7	–	1	7	–	1
Wesleyan +	7	–	1	7	–	1
Trinity (CT)	6	–	2	6	–	2
Bates	4	–	4	4	–	4
Colby	4	–	4	4	–	4
Bowdoin	3	–	5	3	–	5
Williams	2	–	6	2	–	6
Hamilton	0	–	8	0	–	8
Tufts	0	–	8	0	–	8
+ – Conference co-champions

2013 New Jersey Athletic Conference football standings
	Conf.			Overall
Team	W		L	W		L
No. 23 Rowan +^	6	–	1	9	–	3
Brockport +	6	–	1	8	–	3
Cortland	5	–	2	6	–	5
TCNJ	4	–	3	5	–	5
Montclair State	3	–	4	4	–	6
Morrisville State	2	–	5	3	–	7
William Paterson	1	–	6	3	–	7
Kean	1	–	6	2	–	8
+ – Conference co-champions; ^ – NCAA Division III playoff participant; Rankings from D3football.com

2013 North Coast Athletic Conference football standings
	Conf.			Overall
Team	W		L	W		L
No. 10 Wittenberg $^	9	–	0	10	–	2
No. 22 Wabash	8	–	1	9	–	1
Wooster	7	–	2	7	–	3
Denison	6	–	3	7	–	3
Ohio Wesleyan	4	–	5	5	–	5
DePauw	4	–	5	4	–	6
Kenyon	4	–	5	4	–	6
Oberlin	2	–	7	3	–	7
Hiram	1	–	8	2	–	8
Allegheny	0	–	9	0	–	10
$ – Conference champion; ^ – NCAA Division III playoff participant; Rankings from D3football.com

2013 Northern Athletics Collegiate Conference football standings
	Conf.			Overall
Team	W		L	W		L
Concordia (WI) $^	6	–	0	8	–	3
Lakeland	5	–	1	7	–	3
Benedictine (IL)	4	–	2	7	–	3
Wisconsin Lutheran	3	–	3	4	–	6
Aurora	2	–	4	3	–	7
Concordia (IL)	1	–	5	2	–	8
Rockford	0	–	6	1	–	9
$ – Conference champion; ^ – NCAA Division III playoff participant

2013 Northwest Conference football standings
	Conf.			Overall
Team	W		L	W		L
No. 4 Linfield $^	6	–	0	11	–	1
No. 17 Pacific Lutheran ^	5	–	1	8	–	2
Willamette	4	–	2	7	–	2
Pacific (OR)	3	–	3	7	–	3
Whitworth	2	–	4	4	–	6
Lewis & Clark	1	–	5	1	–	8
Puget Sound	0	–	6	1	–	8
$ – Conference champion; ^ – NCAA Division III playoff participant; Rankings from D3football.com

2013 Ohio Athletic Conference football standings
	Conf.			Overall
Team	W		L	W		L
No. 3 Mount Union $^	9	–	0	14	–	1
No. 13 John Carroll ^	8	–	1	9	–	2
No. 21 Heidelberg	7	–	2	8	–	2
Baldwin Wallace	5	–	4	6	–	4
Ohio Northern	5	–	4	6	–	4
Otterbein	5	–	4	5	–	5
Capital	3	–	6	3	–	7
Muskingum	2	–	7	2	–	8
Marietta	1	–	8	1	–	9
Wilmington (OH)	0	–	9	0	–	10
$ – Conference champion; ^ – NCAA Division III playoff participant; Rankings from D3football.com

2013 Old Dominion Athletic Conference football standings
	Conf.			Overall
Team	W		L	W		L
No. 18 Hampden–Sydney $^	6	–	1	9	–	3
Randolph–Macon	5	–	2	7	–	3
Guilford	5	–	2	6	–	4
Catholic University	3	–	4	6	–	4
Washington and Lee	3	–	4	5	–	5
Shenandoah	3	–	4	4	–	6
Emory & Henry	2	–	5	5	–	5
Bridgewater	1	–	6	4	–	6
$ – Conference champion; ^ – NCAA Division III playoff participant; Rankings from D3football.com

2013 Presidents' Athletic Conference football standings
	Conf.			Overall
Team	W		L	W		L
No. 25 Thomas More +	7	–	1	9	–	1
Washington & Jefferson +^	7	–	1	8	–	3
Waynesburg	5	–	3	7	–	4
Geneva	4	–	4	5	–	5
Bethany (WV)	4	–	4	4	–	6
Grove City	3	–	5	5	–	5
Westminster (PA)	3	–	5	4	–	6
Thiel	3	–	5	3	–	7
Saint Vincent	0	–	8	0	–	10
+ – Conference co-champions; ^ – NCAA Division III playoff participant; Rankings from D3football.com

2013 Southern Athletic Association football standings
	Conf.			Overall
Team	W		L	W		L
Millsaps +	5	–	1	9	–	1
Rhodes +	5	–	1	8	–	2
Centre	4	–	2	7	–	3
Birmingham–Southern	3	–	3	5	–	4
Sewanee	3	–	3	4	–	6
Hendrix	1	–	5	3	–	7
Berry	0	–	6	0	–	9
+ – Conference co-champions

2013 Southern California Intercollegiate Athletic Conference football standings
	Conf.			Overall
Team	W		L	W		L
Redlands $^	7	–	0	7	–	3
Chapman	6	–	1	8	–	1
Occidental	4	–	3	5	–	4
Cal Lutheran	4	–	3	4	–	5
Claremont–Mudd–Scripps	2	–	5	3	–	6
La Verne	2	–	5	3	–	6
Pomona–Pitzer	2	–	5	2	–	7
Whittier	1	–	6	1	–	8
$ – Conference champion; ^ – NCAA Division III playoff participant; Rankings from D3football.com

2013 Southern Collegiate Athletic Conference football standings
	Conf.			Overall
Team	W		L	W		L
Texas Lutheran $	3	–	0	8	–	1
Austin	2	–	1	5	–	5
Trinity (TX)	1	–	2	5	–	5
Southwestern (TX)	0	–	3	0	–	10
$ – Conference champion

2013 University Athletic Association football standings
	Conf.			Overall
Team	W		L	W		L
Washington University $^	3	–	0	8	–	3
Case Western Reserve	2	–	1	5	–	4
Chicago	1	–	2	6	–	4
Carnegie Mellon	0	–	3	3	–	7
$ – Conference champion; ^ – Division III playoff participant

2013 Upper Midwest Athletic Conference football standings
	Conf.			Overall
Team	W		L	W		L
St. Scholastica $^	9	–	0	9	–	2
Greenville	8	–	1	9	–	2
Eureka	7	–	2	8	–	2
Northwestern (MN)	6	–	3	6	–	4
Crown	4	–	5	4	–	6
Martin Luther	4	–	5	4	–	6
Minnesota–Morris	3	–	6	3	–	7
Iowa Wesleyan #	2	–	7	2	–	8
Westminster (MO)	2	–	7	2	–	8
MacMurray	0	–	9	0	–	10
$ – Conference champion; ^ – NCAA Division III playoff participant; # – Provisional NCAA Division III member

2013 USA South Athletic Conference football standings
	Conf.			Overall
Team	W		L	W		L
Methodist +	6	–	1	8	–	2
Maryville (TN) +^	6	–	1	8	–	3
Christopher Newport	5	–	2	8	–	2
Huntingdon	5	–	2	7	–	3
LaGrange	5	–	3	5	–	5
Ferrum	2	–	5	2	–	8
North Carolina Wesleyan	2	–	5	2	–	8
Greensboro	1	–	6	2	–	8
Averett	0	–	7	1	–	9
+ – Conference co-champions; ^ – NCAA Division III playoff participant

2013 Wisconsin Intercollegiate Athletic Conference football standings
	Conf.			Overall
Team	W		L	W		L
No. 1 Wisconsin–Whitewater $^	7	–	0	15	–	0
No. 9 Wisconsin–Platteville ^	6	–	1	10	–	2
No. 11 Wisconsin–Oshkosh	5	–	2	8	–	2
Wisconsin–Stevens Point	3	–	4	5	–	5
Wisconsin–La Crosse	3	–	4	3	–	7
Wisconsin–Stout	2	–	5	4	–	6
Wisconsin–Eau Claire	2	–	5	2	–	8
Wisconsin–River Falls	0	–	7	0	–	10
$ – Conference champion; ^ – NCAA Division III playoff participant; Rankings from D3football.com

2013 NCAA Division III independents football records
	Conf.			Overall
Team	W		L	W		L
Southern Virginia #		–		8	–	2
No. 7 Wesley ^		–		10	–	3
Macalester		–		4	–	6
Alfred State #		–		1	–	6
Maranatha Baptist		–		1	–	9
^ – NCAA Division III playoff participant; # – Provisional Division III member; Rankings from D3football.com

== Conference summaries ==
Conference champions
- American Southwest Conference – Mary Hardin–Baylor (13–1, 6–0)
- Centennial Conference – Johns Hopkins (10–1, 9–0)
- College Conference of Illinois and Wisconsin – North Central (IL) (13–1, 7–0)
- Eastern Collegiate Football Conference – Gallaudet (9–2, 6–1)
- Empire 8 Conference – Ithaca (9–3, 6–1)
- Heartland Collegiate Athletic Conference – Franklin (8–4, 7–1) and Rose–Hulman (7–3, 7–1)
- Iowa Intercollegiate Athletic Conference – Wartburg (9–3, 6–1)
- Liberty League – Hobart (10–1, 7–0)
- Massachusetts State Collegiate Athletic Conference – Framingham State (9–2, 8–0)
- Michigan Intercollegiate Athletic Association – Albion (8–3, 6–0)
- Middle Atlantic Conference – Lycoming (7–3, 7–2) and Lebanon Valley (8–3, 7–2)
- Midwest Conference – St. Norbert (8–3, 8–1)
- Minnesota Intercollegiate Athletic Conference – Bethel (MN) (12–1, 8–0)
- New England Football Conference – Endicott (8–3, 7–0)
- New England Small College Athletic Conference – Amherst (7–1, 7–1), Middlebury (7–1, 7–1), and Wesleyan (CT) (7–1, 7–1)
- New Jersey Athletic Conference – Rowan (9–3, 6–1) and Brockport State (8–3, 6–1)
- North Coast Athletic Conference – Wittenberg (10–2, 9–0)
- Northern Athletics Collegiate Conference – Concordia (WI) (8–3, 6–0)
- Northwest Conference – Linfield (11–1, 6–0)
- Ohio Athletic Conference – Mount Union (14–1, 9–0)
- Old Dominion Athletic Conference – Hampden–Sydney (9–3, 6–1)
- Presidents' Athletic Conference – Thomas More (9–1, 7–1) and Washington & Jefferson (8–3, 7–1)
- Southern Athletic Association – Millsaps (9–1, 5–1) and Rhodes (8–2, 5–1)
- Southern California Intercollegiate Athletic Conference – Redlands (7–3, 7–0)
- Southern Collegiate Athletic Conference – Texas Lutheran (8–1, 3–0)
- University Athletic Association – Washington–Saint Louis (8–3, 3–0)
- Upper Midwest Athletic Conference – St. Scholastica (9–2, 9–0)
- USA South Athletic Conference – Methodist (8–2, 6–1) and Maryville (TN) (8–3, 6–1)
- Wisconsin Intercollegiate Athletic Conference – Wisconsin–Whitewater (15–0, 7–0)

== Postseason ==
Twenty-four conferences met the requirements for an automatic ("Pool A") bid to the playoffs. Besides the NESCAC, which does not participate in the playoffs, four conferences had no Pool A bid. The MASCAC and SAA were in the first year of the two-year waiting period; the SCAC and UAA had only four members, three short of the requirement. The American Southwest retained its Pool A bid despite falling below seven active Division III members, but entered the two-year grace period.

Schools not in Pool A conferences were eligible for Pool B. The number of Pool B bids was determined by calculating the ratio of Pool A conferences to schools in those conferences and applying that ratio to the number of Pool B schools. The 24 Pool A conferences contained 203 schools, an average of 8.5 teams per conference. Twenty-seven schools were in Pool B, enough for three bids.

The remaining five playoff spots were at-large ("Pool C") teams.

=== Playoff bracket ===
First Round
November 23
Campus Sites

Second Round
November 30
Campus Sites

Quarterfinals
December 7
Campus Sites

Semifinals
December 14
Campus Sites

National Championship Game

December 20
Salem Football Stadium,
Salem, Virginia
ESPN2

Mount Union*
34

Washington & Jefferson
20

Mount Union*
56

Wittenberg*
58

Wittenberg
21

Lebanon Valley
17

Mount Union*
62

Ithaca*
20

Wesley
59

Framingham State
17

Ithaca
15

Johns Hopkins*
24

Wesley*
23

Wesley
29

Mount Union*
41

North Central (IL)*
63

North Central (IL)
40

Albion
7

North Central (IL)*
52

Wisconsin–Platteville*
54

Wisconsin–Platteville
24

Concordia (WI)
20

North Central (IL)
41

Illinois Wesleyan*
7

Bethel (MN)*
17

Wartburg
41

Wartburg
27

Bethel (MN)*
70

Bethel (MN)*
34

St. Scholastica
13

Mount Union
14

Wisconsin–Whitewater*
31

Wisconsin–Whitewater
52

St. Norbert
7

Wisconsin–Whitewater*
33

Franklin*
17

Franklin
3

Washington–St. Louis
10

Wisconsin–Whitewater*
28

Hampden–Sydney*
42

Linfield
17

Maryville (TN)
34

Hampden–Sydney
21

Linfield*
42

Linfield*
31

Pacific Lutheran
21

Wisconsin–Whitewater
16

Hobart*
34

Mary Hardin–Baylor*
15

Gallaudet
7

Hobart*
6

John Carroll*
16

St. John Fisher
27

St. John Fisher
25

St. John Fisher
23

Rowan*
24

Mary Hardin–Baylor*
45

Endicott
0

Rowan
8

Mary Hardin–Baylor*
35

Mary Hardin–Baylor*
59

Redlands
7

* Home team † Overtime
