= 2018 NCAA Division III football season =

American college football season

- Regular season: August 30 – November 10, 2018
- Playoffs: November 17 – December 14, 2018
- National championship: Woodforest Bank Stadium; Shenandoah, TX
- Champion: Mary Hardin–Baylor
- Gagliardi Trophy: Jackson Erdmann (QB), Saint John's (MN)

The 2018 NCAA Division III football season is the component of the 2018 college football season organized by the NCAA at the Division III level in the United States. The regular season began on August 30 and culminated on November 17.

The season's playoffs ended with the NCAA Division III Football Championship, also known as the Stagg Bowl, at Woodforest Bank Stadium in Shenandoah, Texas. Hosted by the University of Mary Hardin–Baylor, this was the first Stagg Bowl since 1992 to be played away from the Salem Football Stadium in Salem, Virginia.

== News ==
- July 5 – Frostburg State University announced that it had accepted an offer to become an all-sports member of the Division II Mountain East Conference. Pending NCAA approval, the Bobcats will join the MEC for the 2019 season. Frostburg State is currently a football-only affiliate of the New Jersey Athletic Conference.
- August 9 – The Iowa Intercollegiate Athletic Conference, which had added its first member outside the state of Iowa (Nebraska Wesleyan) in 2016, announced a name change to American Rivers Conference.
- September 22 – After previously announcing that they would be joining the Division II Great Lakes Valley Conference for the 2019 season, Benedictine University reversed course and will instead remain at the Division III level. The Eagles are currently all-sports members of the Northern Athletics Collegiate Conference.

== Conference changes and new programs ==
School	2017 conference	2018 conference
Alvernia	New program	MAC
Eureka	UMAC	NACC
Ferrum	USA South	ODAC
Finlandia	D–III Independent	MIAA
Mount Ida	ECFC	University closed
New England	New program	CCC Football
Washington–St. Louis	UAA	CCIW

== Conference standings ==
2018 American Rivers Conference football standings
	Conf.			Overall
Team	W		L	W		L
Wartburg $^	7	–	1	8	–	3
Central (IA)	6	–	2	8	–	2
Dubuque	6	–	2	7	–	3
Simpson (IA)	6	–	2	7	–	3
Coe	5	–	3	6	–	4
Loras	3	–	5	4	–	6
Nebraska Wesleyan	2	–	6	3	–	7
Luther	1	–	7	1	–	9
Buena Vista	1	–	9	0	–	8
$ – Conference champion; ^ – NCAA Division III playoff participant

2018 American Southwest Conference football standings
	Conf.			Overall
Team	W		L	W		L
No. 1 Mary Hardin–Baylor $^	9	–	0	15	–	0
No. 7 Hardin–Simmons ^	8	–	1	9	–	2
Texas Lutheran	6	–	3	7	–	3
East Texas Baptist	6	–	3	6	–	4
Southwestern (TX)	5	–	4	6	–	4
Louisiana College	5	–	4	5	–	5
Belhaven #	2	–	7	2	–	8
McMurry	2	–	7	2	–	8
Howard Payne	1	–	8	1	–	9
Sul Ross	1	–	8	1	–	9
$ – Conference champion; ^ – NCAA Division III playoff participant; # – Provisional NCAA Division III member; Rankings from D3football.com

2018 Centennial Conference football standings
	Conf.			Overall
Team	W		L	W		L
No. 5 Johns Hopkins +^	8	–	1	12	–	2
No. 9 Muhlenberg +^	8	–	1	11	–	2
Franklin & Marshall	6	–	3	7	–	3
Susquehanna	6	–	3	7	–	3
Ursinus	6	–	3	7	–	3
Moravian	4	–	5	5	–	5
Dickinson	4	–	5	4	–	6
McDaniel	2	–	7	3	–	7
Gettysburg	1	–	8	1	–	9
Juniata	0	–	9	0	–	10
+ – Conference co-champions; ^ – NCAA Division III playoff participant; Rankings from D3football.com

2018 College Conference of Illinois and Wisconsin football standings
	Conf.			Overall
Team	W		L	W		L
No. 8 North Central (IL) +^	8	–	1	10	–	2
No. 19 Illinois Wesleyan +	8	–	1	8	–	2
Washington University	7	–	2	8	–	2
No. 23 Wheaton (IL)	7	–	2	8	–	2
Millikin	5	–	4	6	–	4
Carthage	4	–	5	4	–	6
Augustana (IL)	3	–	6	4	–	6
Carroll (WI)	2	–	7	3	–	7
North Park	1	–	8	2	–	8
Elmhurst	0	–	9	1	–	9
+ – Conference co-champions; ^ – NCAA Division III playoff participant; Rankings from D3football.com

2018 Commonwealth Coast Conference football standings
	Conf.			Overall
Team	W		L	W		L
Western New England +^	5	–	1	8	–	3
Endicott +	5	–	1	7	–	4
Salve Regina +	5	–	1	7	–	4
Nichols	3	–	3	5	–	5
Curry	1	–	5	3	–	7
New England	1	–	5	2	–	7
Becker	1	–	5	1	–	9
+ – Conference co-champions; ^ – NCAA Division III playoff participant

2018 Eastern Collegiate Football Conference standings
	Conf.			Overall
Team	W		L	W		L
Husson $^	6	–	0	8	–	3
SUNY Maritime	5	–	1	7	–	4
Dean #	4	–	2	5	–	5
Gallaudet	3	–	3	3	–	5
Castleton	1	–	5	2	–	8
Alfred State	1	–	5	1	–	9
Anna Maria	1	–	5	1	–	9
$ – Conference champion; ^ – NCAA Division III playoff participant; # – Provisional Division III member

2018 Empire 8 Athletic Conference football standings
	Conf.			Overall
Team	W		L	W		L
No. 13 Brockport $^	7	–	0	11	–	1
Cortland	5	–	2	7	–	3
Alfred	4	–	3	7	–	4
Utica	4	–	3	7	–	4
Morrisville State	4	–	3	6	–	5
St. John Fisher	3	–	4	3	–	6
Buffalo State	1	–	6	1	–	9
Hartwick	0	–	7	2	–	8
$ – Conference champion; ^ – NCAA Division III playoff participant; Rankings from D3football.com

2018 Heartland Collegiate Athletic Conference football standings
	Conf.			Overall
Team	W		L	W		L
Franklin (IN) +	7	–	1	8	–	2
Mount St. Joseph +	7	–	1	8	–	2
Hanover +^	7	–	1	7	–	4
Rose–Hulman	5	–	3	5	–	5
Manchester	4	–	4	4	–	6
Bluffton	3	–	5	3	–	7
Anderson (IN)	2	–	6	2	–	8
Defiance	1	–	7	1	–	9
Earlham	0	–	8	0	–	10
+ – Conference co-champions; ^ – NCAA Division III playoff participant

2018 Liberty League football standings
	Conf.			Overall
Team	W		L	W		L
No. 11 RPI +^	4	–	1	10	–	2
Ithaca +	4	–	1	8	–	3
Union (NY)	3	–	2	7	–	2
Hobart	3	–	2	5	–	4
St. Lawrence	1	–	4	2	–	8
Rochester (NY)	0	–	5	1	–	9
+ – Conference co-champions; ^ – NCAA Division III playoff participant; Rankings from D3football.com

2018 Massachusetts State Collegiate Athletic Conference football standings
	Conf.			Overall
Team	W		L	W		L
Framingham State $^	7	–	1	8	–	3
Western Connecticut	6	–	2	8	–	2
Bridgewater State	6	–	2	8	–	3
Plymouth State	5	–	3	6	–	4
UMass Dartmouth	4	–	4	5	–	5
Westfield State	4	–	4	5	–	5
Fitchburg State	2	–	6	2	–	8
Massachusetts Maritime	1	–	7	2	–	8
Worcester State	1	–	7	2	–	8
$ – Conference champion; ^ – NCAA Division III playoff participant

2018 Michigan Intercollegiate Athletic Association football standings
	Conf.			Overall
Team	W		L	W		L
No. 24 Trine $^	7	–	0	10	–	1
Hope	6	–	1	8	–	2
Albion	4	–	3	7	–	3
Kalamazoo	4	–	3	7	–	3
Olivet	4	–	3	6	–	4
Adrian	2	–	5	4	–	6
Alma	1	–	6	2	–	8
Finlandia	0	–	7	0	–	10
$ – Conference champion; ^ – NCAA Division III playoff participant; Rankings from D3football.com

2018 Middle Atlantic Conference football standings
	Conf.			Overall
Team	W		L	W		L
No. 16 Delaware Valley $^	8	–	0	9	–	2
Misericordia	7	–	1	8	–	3
Stevenson	7	–	1	8	–	3
FDU Florham	4	–	4	6	–	4
King's	4	–	4	5	–	5
Wilkes	4	–	4	5	–	5
Lycoming	4	–	4	5	–	6
Widener	4	–	4	4	–	6
Lebanon Valley	2	–	6	2	–	8
Alvernia	0	–	8	1	–	9
Albright	0	–	8	0	–	10
$ – Conference champion; ^ – NCAA Division III playoff participant; Rankings from D3football.com

2018 Midwest Conference football standings
	Conf.			Overall
Team	W		L	W		L
North
No. 21 St. Norbert xy$^	5	–	0	10	–	2
Chicago	4	–	1	7	–	3
Ripon	3	–	2	7	–	3
Macalester	2	–	3	5	–	5
Lawrence	1	–	4	2	–	8
Beloit	0	–	5	1	–	9
South
Monmouth (IL) xy	5	–	0	8	–	2
Lake Forest	4	–	1	6	–	4
Cornell (IA)	2	–	3	5	–	5
Illinois College	2	–	3	4	–	6
Knox	2	–	3	2	–	8
Grinnell	0	–	5	2	–	8
Championship: St. Norbert 10, Monmouth 7
$ – Conference champion; x – Division champion/co-champions; y – Championship game participant; ^ – NCAA Division III playoff participant; Rankings from D3football.com

2018 Minnesota Intercollegiate Athletic Conference football standings
	Conf.			Overall
Team	W		L	W		L
No. 3 Saint John's (MN) $^	8	–	0	12	–	1
No. 7 Bethel (MN) ^	7	–	1	11	–	2
No. 15 St. Thomas (MN)	6	–	2	8	–	2
Gustavus Adolphus	5	–	3	6	–	4
Concordia–Moorhead	4	–	4	5	–	5
St. Olaf	3	–	5	5	–	5
Carleton	2	–	6	3	–	7
Hamline	1	–	7	1	–	9
Augsburg	0	–	8	2	–	8
$ – Conference champion; ^ – NCAA Division III playoff participant; Rankings from D3football.com

2018 New England Small College Athletic Conference football standings
	Conf.			Overall
Team	W		L	W		L
Amherst +	8	–	1	8	–	1
Trinity (CT) +	8	–	1	8	–	1
Tufts	7	–	2	7	–	2
Middlebury	5	–	4	5	–	4
Wesleyan	5	–	4	5	–	4
Williams	5	–	4	5	–	4
Colby	2	–	7	2	–	7
Hamilton	2	–	7	2	–	7
Bowdoin	1	–	8	1	–	8
Bates	0	–	9	0	–	9
+ – Conference co-champions

2018 New England Women's and Men's Athletic Conference football standings
	Conf.			Overall
Team	W		L	W		L
MIT $^	6	–	1	9	–	2
Merchant Marine	5	–	2	8	–	2
Springfield	5	–	2	8	–	3
Coast Guard	5	–	2	7	–	3
WPI	4	–	3	6	–	4
Norwich	2	–	5	3	–	7
Catholic University	1	–	6	1	–	9
Maine Maritime	0	–	7	0	–	9
$ – Conference champion; ^ – NCAA Division III playoff participant

2018 New Jersey Athletic Conference football standings
	Conf.			Overall
Team	W		L	W		L
No. 12 Frostburg State $^	8	–	0	10	–	1
Montclair State	7	–	2	8	–	2
Salisbury	7	–	2	8	–	3
Christopher Newport	6	–	2	7	–	2
Wesley	5	–	4	7	–	4
Rowan	5	–	4	6	–	4
TCNJ	3	–	6	3	–	7
Southern Virginia	2	–	7	3	–	7
Kean	1	–	8	1	–	9
William Paterson	0	–	9	0	–	10
$ – Conference champion; ^ – NCAA Division III playoff participant; Rankings from D3football.com

2018 North Coast Athletic Conference football standings
	Conf.			Overall
Team	W		L	W		L
No. 25 Wabash +	8	–	1	9	–	1
Wittenberg +	8	–	1	9	–	1
Denison +^	8	–	1	8	–	3
Allegheny	6	–	3	6	–	4
Wooster	4	–	5	5	–	5
DePauw	4	–	5	4	–	6
Ohio Wesleyan	4	–	5	4	–	6
Oberlin	2	–	7	2	–	8
Hiram	1	–	8	2	–	8
Kenyon	0	–	9	0	–	10
+ – Conference co-champions; ^ – NCAA Division III playoff participant; Rankings from D3football.com

2018 Northern Athletics Collegiate Conference football standings
	Conf.			Overall
Team	W		L	W		L
Eureka $^	6	–	1	9	–	2
Concordia (WI)	5	–	2	7	–	3
Aurora	5	–	2	5	–	5
Lakeland	4	–	3	4	–	6
Benedictine (IL)	3	–	4	3	–	7
Rockford	2	–	5	3	–	7
Wisconsin Lutheran	2	–	5	2	–	8
Concordia (IL)	1	–	6	2	–	8
$ – Conference champion; ^ – NCAA Division III playoff participant

2018 Northwest Conference football standings
	Conf.			Overall
Team	W		L	W		L
No. 10 Whitworth $^	7	–	0	10	–	1
No. 22 Linfield	6	–	1	7	–	2
George Fox	4	–	3	6	–	4
Pacific (OR)	4	–	3	5	–	5
Puget Sound	3	–	4	5	–	5
Pacific Lutheran	3	–	4	4	–	5
Lewis & Clark	1	–	6	2	–	7
Willamette	0	–	7	1	–	8
$ – Conference champion; ^ – NCAA Division III playoff participant; Rankings from D3football.com

2018 Ohio Athletic Conference football standings
	Conf.			Overall
Team	W		L	W		L
No. 2 Mount Union $^	9	–	0	14	–	1
No. 20 John Carroll ^	8	–	1	9	–	2
Baldwin Wallace	7	–	2	8	–	2
Marietta	6	–	3	7	–	3
Heidelberg	4	–	5	5	–	5
Ohio Northern	4	–	5	5	–	5
Muskingum	3	–	6	4	–	6
Capital	3	–	6	3	–	7
Otterbein	1	–	8	2	–	8
Wilmington (OH)	0	–	9	1	–	9
$ – Conference champion; ^ – NCAA Division III playoff participant; Rankings from D3football.com

2018 Old Dominion Athletic Conference football standings
	Conf.			Overall
Team	W		L	W		L
No. 18 Randolph–Macon $^	6	–	1	9	–	3
Bridgewater	4	–	3	6	–	4
Hampden–Sydney	4	–	3	4	–	5
Washington and Lee	3	–	4	5	–	4
Ferrum	3	–	4	5	–	5
Shenandoah	3	–	4	5	–	5
Emory & Henry	3	–	4	4	–	5
Guilford	2	–	5	3	–	6
$ – Conference champion; ^ – NCAA Division III playoff participant; Rankings from D3football.com

2018 Presidents' Athletic Conference football standings
	Conf.			Overall
Team	W		L	W		L
Washington & Jefferson $^	8	–	1	9	–	2
Case Western Reserve	7	–	2	8	–	2
Westminster (PA)	7	–	2	7	–	4
Grove City	6	–	3	8	–	3
Carnegie Mellon	5	–	4	6	–	4
Bethany (WV)	5	–	4	5	–	5
Waynesburg	4	–	5	4	–	6
Geneva	2	–	7	2	–	8
Saint Vincent	1	–	8	1	–	9
Thiel	0	–	9	0	–	10
$ – Conference champion; ^ – NCAA Division III playoff participant

2018 Southern Athletic Association football standings
	Conf.			Overall
Team	W		L	W		L
No. 17 Berry +^	7	–	1	10	–	2
No. 14 Centre +^	7	–	1	10	–	2
Trinity (TX)	6	–	2	7	–	3
Birmingham–Southern	4	–	4	6	–	4
Millsaps	3	–	5	5	–	5
Rhodes	3	–	5	5	–	5
Sewanee	3	–	5	4	–	6
Austin	2	–	6	2	–	8
Hendrix	1	–	7	2	–	8
+ – Conference co-champions; ^ – NCAA Division III playoff participant; Rankings from D3football.com

2018 Southern California Intercollegiate Athletic Conference football standings
	Conf.			Overall
Team	W		L	W		L
Redlands +	6	–	1	8	–	2
Claremont–Mudd–Scripps +^	6	–	1	7	–	4
Pomona–Pitzer	5	–	2	6	–	3
Chapman	4	–	3	5	–	4
Cal Lutheran	3	–	4	4	–	6
La Verne	3	–	4	3	–	6
Whittier	1	–	6	1	–	8
Occidental	0	–	7	0	–	8
+ – Conference co-champions; ^ – NCAA Division III playoff participant; Rankings from D3football.com

2018 Upper Midwest Athletic Conference football standings
	Conf.			Overall
Team	W		L	W		L
Martin Luther $^	8	–	0	9	–	2
MacMurray	7	–	1	7	–	2
St. Scholastica	6	–	2	6	–	4
Northwestern (MN)	5	–	3	5	–	5
Westminster (MO)	3	–	5	3	–	6
Greenville	3	–	5	3	–	7
Minnesota–Morris	3	–	5	3	–	7
Iowa Wesleyan	1	–	7	1	–	9
Crown	0	–	8	0	–	10
$ – Conference champion; ^ – NCAA Division III playoff participant

2018 USA South Athletic Conference football standings
	Conf.			Overall
Team	W		L	W		L
Maryville (TN) $^	7	–	0	7	–	3
Averett	6	–	1	8	–	2
North Carolina Wesleyan	4	–	3	5	–	5
Huntingdon	4	–	3	4	–	5
Brevard #	3	–	4	4	–	6
LaGrange	2	–	5	3	–	7
Methodist	2	–	5	2	–	7
Greensboro	0	–	7	1	–	9
$ – Conference champion; ^ – NCAA Division III playoff participant; # – Provisional Division III member

2018 Wisconsin Intercollegiate Athletic Conference football standings
	Conf.			Overall
Team	W		L	W		L
No. 4 Wisconsin–Whitewater $^	7	–	0	12	–	1
Wisconsin–La Crosse	5	–	2	7	–	3
Wisconsin–Oshkosh	4	–	3	6	–	4
Wisconsin–Stout	3	–	4	5	–	5
Wisconsin–Stevens Point	3	–	4	4	–	6
Wisconsin–Eau Claire	2	–	5	4	–	6
Wisconsin–Platteville	2	–	5	4	–	6
Wisconsin–River Falls	2	–	5	3	–	7
$ – Conference champion; ^ – NCAA Division III playoff participant; Rankings from D3football.com

2018 NCAA Division III independents football records
	Conf.			Overall
Team	W		L	W		L
Thomas More		–		7	–	3

== Postseason ==
Twenty-six conferences met the requirements for an automatic ("Pool A") bid to the playoffs. Other than the NESCAC, which does not participate in the playoffs, the NEWMAC was the only conference with no Pool A bid, being in the second year of the two-year waiting period after beginning football sponsorship in 2017. With the loss of Mount Ida, the ECFC fell one below the required seven members – not counting second-year provisional member Dean – and entered the first year of the two-year grace period, while the Liberty League was in the second year of the grace period. The American Southwest, which had fallen below seven members in 2013 and lost its Pool A bid after the grace period, regained it, having attained seven members in 2016 and passed through the waiting period.

Schools not in Pool A conferences were eligible for Pool B. The number of Pool B bids was determined by calculating the ratio of Pool A conferences to schools in those conferences and applying that ratio to the number of Pool B schools. The 26 Pool A conferences contained 228 schools, an average of 8.8 teams per conference. Nine schools were in Pool B, enough for one bid.

The remaining five playoff spots were at-large ("Pool C") teams.

=== Playoff bracket ===
First round November 17
Mary Hardin–Baylor*	27
Hardin–Simmons	6
Berry*	31
Maryville (TN)	0
Saint John's (MN)	84
Martin Luther	6
Whitworth*	48
Claremont–Mudd–Scripps	6
Wisconsin–Whitewater	67
Eureka	14
Trine	7
St. Norbert	31
North Central (IL)	52
Hanover	0
Bethel	41
Wartburg	14
Mount Union	60
Denison	0
Centre	54
Washington & Jefferson	13
John Carroll	20
Randolph–Macon	23
Delaware Valley	13
Muhlenberg	20
Brockport	40
Framingham State	27
RPI	38
Husson	14
Frostburg State	42
Western New England	24
Johns Hopkins	49
MIT	0

Second round November 24
Mary Hardin–Baylor*	75
Berry	9
Saint John's (MN)	45
Whitworth	24
Wisconsin–Whitewater	54
St. Norbert	21
North Central (IL)	24
Bethel (MN)	27
Mount Union	51
Centre	23
Randolph–Macon	6
Muhlenberg	35
Brockport	13
RPI	21
Frostburg State	27
Johns Hopkins	58

Quarterfinals; December 1
Mary Hardin–Baylor	21
Saint John's (MN)	18
Wisconsin–Whitewater	26
Bethel (MN)	12
Mount Union	38
Muhlenberg	10
RPI	14
Johns Hopkins	37

Semifinals; December 8
Mary Hardin–Baylor	31
Wisconsin–Whitewater	14
Mount Union	28
Johns Hopkins	20

Championship; Stagg Bowl; December 14; Shenandoah, Texas
Mary Hardin–Baylor	24
Mount Union	16

== See also ==
- 2018 NCAA Division I FBS football season
- 2018 NCAA Division I FCS football season
- 2018 NCAA Division II football season
- 2018 NAIA football season
