= Mount Berry, Georgia =

Unincorporated community in Georgia, U.S.

Coordinates: 34°16′30″N 85°11′00″W

Mount Berry is an unincorporated community contiguous with the main campus of Berry College in Floyd County, Georgia, United States, bordering the city of Rome. Mount Berry Mall, the shopping mall serving Rome, is in the Mount Berry area. It is part of the Rome, Georgia Metropolitan Statistical Area. The ZIP Code for Mount Berry is 30149.

== History ==
Mount Berry was named after Berry College founder Martha Berry. The Georgia General Assembly incorporated it as a town in 1935. The town's municipal charter was repealed in 1973.
