= Southern Athletic Association =

NCAA Division III collegiate division

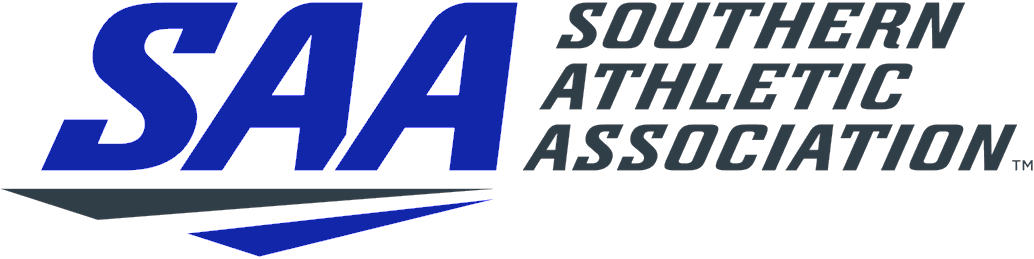
- Association: NCAA
- Founded: Chartered: 2011; Began play: 2012
- Commissioner: Stacey LaDew
- Sports fielded: 23; men's: 11; women's: 12
- Division: Division III
- No. of teams: 9 (6 in 2027)
- Headquarters: Atlanta, Georgia
- Website: saa-sports.com

Locations

Southern Athletic Association
Location of SAA members:
Current members
Departing members

The Southern Athletic Association (SAA) is an intercollegiate athletic conference that competes in the National Collegiate Athletic Association (NCAA) Division III that began play in the 2012–13 school year. It was formed in 2011 by seven former members of the Southern Collegiate Athletic Conference and independent Berry College.

== History ==
=== Recent events ===
On March 9, 2023, Trinity University of Texas and Southwestern University of Texas announced they would join the SAA as full members, beginning in the 2025–26 academic year.

On May 26, 2024, Birmingham–Southern College announced that it would close at the end of the 2023–24 school year (more precisely, on May 31 of that year).

On June 11, 2024, Hendrix College announced it would return to the Southern Collegiate Athletic Conference (SCAC) at the end of the 2024–25 school year.

On July 23, 2024, Maryville College was accepted to the SAA as a full member, to join beginning in the 2026–27 academic year. Maryville's football and women's golf would join SAA competition as an associate member, beginning in 2025–26.

=== Chronological timeline ===
- 2011 – The Southern Athletic Association (SAA) was founded, whose charter members include seven member schools that were competing for the Southern Collegiate Athletic Conference (SCAC): (Birmingham–Southern College, Centre College, Hendrix College, Millsaps College, Oglethorpe University, Rhodes College and Sewanee: The University of the South), and NCAA Division III independent Berry College, with competition to begin effective in the 2012–13 academic year.
- 2015 – The University of Chicago and Washington University in St. Louis joined the SAA as affiliate members for football in the 2015 fall season (2015–16 academic year).
- 2017:
  - Chicago and Washington (Mo.) left the SAA as affiliate members for football after the 2016 fall season (2016–17 school year).
  - Austin College and Trinity University of Texas joined the SAA as affiliate members for football in the 2017 fall season (2017–18 academic year).
- 2021 – Austin College left the SAA as an affiliate member for football after the 2020 fall season (2020–21 school year).
- 2023 – Southwestern University of Texas joined the SAA as an affiliate member for football in the 2023 fall season (2023–24 academic year).
- 2024 – Birmingham–Southern left the SAA after the 2023–24 school year; as the school closed on May 31 of that year.
- 2025:
  - Hendrix left the SAA to rejoin the Southern Collegiate Athletic Conference (SCAC) after the 2024–25 academic year.
  - Trinity (Tex.) and Southwestern (Tex.) upgraded to join the SAA for all sports as full members in the 2025–26 academic year.
  - Maryville College joined the SAA as an affiliate member for football and women's golf in the 2025–26 academic year.
- 2026 – Maryville College upgraded to join the SAA for all sports as a full member, beginning the 2026–27 academic year.
- 2027
  - Millsaps and Southwestern (Tex.) will leave the SAA to rejoin the SCAC after the 2026–27 academic year.
  - Maryville will leave the SAA to rejoin the Collegiate Conference of the South (CCS) after the 2026–27 academic year. They will remain as an SAA affiliate member for football, women's golf, and softball.

== Member schools ==
Every member in the history of the SAA, whether current, former, full, or associate, has been a private school.

=== Full members ===
==== Current full members ====
The SAA currently has nine full members.

Institution	Location	Founded	Affiliation	Enrollment	Endowment	Nickname	Joined (Note: Represents the calendar year when fall sports competition begins.)	Colors	Football?
Berry College	Mount Berry, Georgia	1902	Nondenominational	2,278	$1,469,124,000	Vikings	2012		Yes
Centre College	Danville, Kentucky	1819	Presbyterian	~1,400	$414,294,000	Colonels	2012		Yes
Maryville College	Maryville, Tennessee	1819	Presbyterian (PCUSA)	1,153	$116,100,566	Scots	2026		Yes
Millsaps College	Jackson, Mississippi	1890	United Methodist	584	$115,460,000	Majors	2012		Yes
Oglethorpe University	Atlanta, Georgia	1835	Nondenominational	~1,400	$55,090,000	Stormy Petrels	2012		No
Rhodes College	Memphis, Tennessee	1848	Presbyterian	~1,800	$448,475,000	Lynx	2012		Yes
Sewanee: The University of the South	Sewanee, Tennessee	1857	Episcopal	1,724	$517,640,000	Tigers	2012		Yes
Southwestern University	Georgetown, Texas	1840	United Methodist	1,434	$403,500,000	Pirates	2025		Yes
Trinity University	San Antonio, Texas	1869	Nonsectarian (Note: Partially affiliated with the Presbyterian Church.)	2,423	$1,938,800,000	Tigers	2025		Yes

==== Former full members ====
Institution	Location	Founded	Affiliation	Nickname	Joined (Note: Represents the calendar year when fall sports competition begins.)	Left (Note: Represents the calendar year when spring sports competition ends.)	Colors	Football?	Current conference
Birmingham–Southern College	Birmingham, Alabama	1856	United Methodist	Panthers	2012	2024		Yes	Closed in 2024
Hendrix College	Conway, Arkansas	1876	United Methodist	Warriors	2012	2025		Yes	Southern Collegiate (SCAC)

=== Affiliate members ===
Two schools, the University of Chicago and Washington University in St. Louis (WashU), announced their intention to become affiliate members of the conference for football, effective in 2015. Both are members of the University Athletic Association (UAA), which at the time had a football scheduling alliance with the North Coast Athletic Conference (NCAC). However, after the 2012 season, the NCAC adopted a full round-robin football schedule, making it impossible for that conference to fill in all of its non-conference dates with the four UAA members that sponsor the sport.

Over the summer of 2015, Chicago and WashU announced that they would leave the SAA after two seasons of competition in order to join more geographically-convenient conferences. WashU will maintain its football affiliation with the UAA for the 2017 season before joining the College Conference of Illinois and Wisconsin in 2018 as a football-only member. For nearly a year, Chicago did not announce a future league affiliation, but it announced in May 2016 that it would become a football-only member of the Midwest Conference in 2017.

On November 18, 2015, Trinity University and Austin College announced they would affiliate with the SAA for football, renewing a relationship that was lost when the SAA split from the Southern Collegiate Athletic Conference. As a result, the SCAC will no longer offer football as a sport from 2017. On August 13, 2020, Austin College announced it would move to the American Southwest Conference as a football-only affiliate beginning with the 2021 season, committing to at least four years as an affiliate.

On August 19, 2021, the conference announced that Southwestern University, a current football-only affiliate member of the American Southwest Conference, would join the SAA as a football-only affiliate effective with the 2023 football season. On March 9, 2023, the SAA announced that Southwestern University and Trinity University will join the SAA as full members in 2025.

==== Former affiliate members ====
Six schools have been SAA affiliate members but have since either left the conference or upgraded to full membership.

Institution	Location	Founded	Affiliation	Enrollment	Nickname	Joined (Note: Represents the calendar year when fall sports competition begins.)	Left (Note: Represents the calendar year when spring sports competition ends.)	Colors	SAA sport(s)	Primary conference
Austin College	Sherman, Texas	1849	Presbyterian	1,278	'Roos	2017	2021		Football	Southern Collegiate (SCAC)
University of Chicago	Chicago, Illinois	1890	Non-denominational	5,134	Maroons	2015	2017		Football	University (UAA) (Note: After competing in the SAA as an affiliate member, Chicago's football team later joined the Midwest Conference (MWC) as of the 2017 fall season (2017–18 school year).)
Maryville College	Maryville, Tennessee	1819	Presbyterian (PCUSA)	1,153	Scots	2025	2026		Football	Southern (SAA)
Southwestern University	Georgetown, Texas	1840	United Methodist	1,507	Pirates	2023	2025		Football	Southern (SAA)
Trinity University	San Antonio, Texas	1869	Nonsectarian (Note: Partially affiliated with the Presbyterian Church.)	2,423	Tigers	2017	2025		Football	Southern (SAA)
Washington University in St. Louis	St. Louis, Missouri	1853	Nonsectarian	5,997	Bears	2015	2017		Football	University (UAA) (Note: After competing in the SAA as an affiliate member, Washington (Mo.)'s football team joined the College Conference of Illinois and Wisconsin (CCIW) in the 2018 fall season (2018–19 school year) to the 2025 fall season (2025–26 school year). They are currently in the North Coast Athletic Conference as of the 2026 fall season (2026–27 school year).)

=== Membership timeline ===
Full member (all sports) Full member (non-football) Associate member (football) Associate member (sport)

== Sports ==
The Southern Athletic Association sponsors 11 men's sports and 12 women's sports. The members mostly sponsor all the sports in the conference except that Oglethorpe University does not have a football team.

Teams in Southern Athletic Association competition
Sport	Men's	Women's
Baseball	8	-
Basketball	8	8
Cross country	8	8
Football	8	-
Golf	8	9
Lacrosse	6	6
Soccer	8	8
Softball	-	7
Swimming & diving	7	7
Tennis	8	8
Indoor track & field	8	8
Outdoor track & field	8	8
Volleyball	-	8

=== Men's sponsored sports by school ===
School	Baseball	Basketball	Cross Country	Football	Golf	Lacrosse	Soccer	Swimming & Diving	Tennis	Track & Field (Indoor)	Track & Field (Outdoor)	Total SAA Sports
Berry	Yes	Yes	Yes	Yes	Yes	Yes	Yes	Yes	Yes	Yes	Yes	11
Centre	Yes	Yes	Yes	Yes	Yes	Yes	Yes	Yes	Yes	Yes	Yes	11
Maryville	Yes	Yes	Yes	Yes	Yes	No	Yes	No	Yes	Yes	Yes	9
Millsaps	Yes	Yes	Yes	Yes	Yes	No	Yes	Yes	Yes	Yes	Yes	10
Oglethorpe	Yes	Yes	Yes	No	Yes	Yes	Yes	No	Yes	Yes	Yes	9
Rhodes	Yes	Yes	Yes	Yes	Yes	Yes	Yes	Yes	Yes	Yes	Yes	11
Sewanee	Yes	Yes	Yes	Yes	Yes	Yes	Yes	Yes	Yes	Yes	Yes	11
Southwestern	Yes	Yes	Yes	Yes	Yes	Yes	Yes	Yes	Yes	Yes	Yes	11
Trinity	Yes	Yes	Yes	Yes	Yes	No	Yes	Yes	Yes	Yes	Yes	10
Totals	9	9	9	8	9	6	9	7	9	9	9	93

=== Women's sponsored sports by school ===
School	Basketball	Cross Country	Golf	Lacrosse	Soccer	Softball	Swimming & Diving	Tennis	Track & Field (Indoor)	Track & Field (Outdoor)	Volleyball	Total SAA Sports
Berry	Yes	Yes	Yes	Yes	Yes	Yes	Yes	Yes	Yes	Yes	Yes	11
Centre	Yes	Yes	Yes	Yes	Yes	Yes	Yes	Yes	Yes	Yes	Yes	11
Maryville	Yes	Yes	Yes	No	Yes	Yes	No	Yes	Yes	Yes	Yes	9
Millsaps	Yes	Yes	Yes	No	Yes	Yes	Yes	Yes	Yes	Yes	Yes	10
Oglethorpe	Yes	Yes	Yes	Yes	Yes	No	No	Yes	Yes	Yes	Yes	9
Rhodes	Yes	Yes	Yes	Yes	Yes	Yes	Yes	Yes	Yes	Yes	Yes	11
Sewanee	Yes	Yes	Yes	Yes	Yes	Yes	Yes	Yes	Yes	Yes	Yes	11
Southwestern	Yes	Yes	Yes	Yes	Yes	Yes	Yes	Yes	Yes	Yes	Yes	11
Trinity	Yes	Yes	Yes	No	Yes	Yes	Yes	Yes	Yes	Yes	Yes	10
Totals	9	9	9	6	9	8	7	9	9	9	9	93

Women's varsity sports not sponsored by the Southern Athletic Association which are played by SAA schools:

School	Field Hockey
Centre	CFHC
Rhodes	CFHC
Sewanee	CFHC
