= 2024 North Central Cardinals football team =

American college football season

2024 North Central Cardinals football

NCAA Division III national champion CCIW champion

Stagg Bowl, W 41–25 vs. Mount Union
- Conference: College Conference of Illinois and Wisconsin
- Record: 15–0 (9–0 CCIW)
- Head coach: Brad Spencer (3rd season)
- Offensive coordinator: Eric Stuedemann (3rd season)
- Offensive scheme: West Coast spread
- Defensive coordinator: Shane Dierking (6th season)
- Base defense: 4–3
- Home stadium: Benedetti–Wehrli Stadium

2024 College Conference of Illinois and Wisconsin football standings
	Conf.			Overall
Team	W		L	W		L
No. 1 North Central (IL) $^	9	–	0	15	–	0
No. 20 Wheaton (IL)	8	–	1	9	–	2
Washington University	7	–	2	8	–	2
Illinois Wesleyan	5	–	4	5	–	5
Carroll (WI)	4	–	5	5	–	5
North Park	4	–	5	5	–	5
Augustana (IL)	3	–	6	4	–	6
Elmhurst	3	–	6	3	–	7
Carthage	2	–	7	2	–	8
Millikin	0	–	9	0	–	10
$ – Conference champion; ^ – NCAA Division III playoff participant; Rankings from D3Football.com

The 2024 North Central Cardinals football team was an American football team that represented North Central College of Naperville, Illinois, as a member of the College Conference of Illinois and Wisconsin (CCIW) during the 2024 NCAA Division III football season. In their second year under head coach Brad Spencer, the Cardinals compiled a 15–0 record (9–0 in conference games), won the CCIW championship, and were ranked No. 1 in Division III at the end of the regular season.

The team advanced to the Division III playoffs where they defeated Whitworth in the second round, Hope in the third round, and Springfield in the national quarterfinal.

== CCIW preseason poll ==
The CCIW released its preseason coaches' prediction poll on August 19, 2024. The Cardinals were predicted to finish first in the conference, receiving 8 of the possible 10 first place votes.

== Personnel ==
2024 North Central Cardinals football team roster
Players
Coaches
Offense

Pos.	#	Name	Class
RB	1	Sean Allen	So
WR	2	Myles Walton	Jr
WR	3	Jacob Paradee	GS
WR	4	Terance Washington	So
QB	5	Luke Lehnen	GS
QB	6	Alex Porter	Jr
WR	7	Thomas Skokna	Jr
WR	8	Jack Rummell	So
WR	9	Grant McAtee	Fr
RB	11	Donovan McNeal	Fr
QB	12	Calvin Lavery	Jr
WR	13	Drew Willis	Fr
WR	14	Trey Madsen	GS
QB	16	Eric Franklin	So
WR	17	Nathan Rodgers	Fr
QB	18	Dennis Mandala	Fr
WR	18	Jake Pieper	Jr
WR	19	Mason Pierre-Antoine	Jr
WR	19	Emmett Robinson	Fr
RB	21	Charles Coleman	Jr
RB	22	Jordan Chismu	Sr
RB	23	Chris Hughes	Fr
RB	24	Joe Sacco	Sr
RB	28	Chase Boyd	Fr
RB	29	Matt Larson	Fr
RB	30	Jordan Williams	So
RB	40	Matthew Kraskouskas	So
TE	41	Dawson Trebolo	So
TE	42	Alex Hobson	Jr
TE	42	Dylan Ross	Jr
TE	47	Ahren Becker	Fr
OL	50	Colin Sturm	Fr
OL	54	Tyson Cramer	So
OL	56	Chase Stepp	Fr
OL	57	Nyles Robinson	Fr
OL	58	Sam Pryor	Sr
OL	60	Anthony Sivric	So
OL	63	Jerred Durian	Jr
OL	64	David Fuchs	Sr
OL	65	Alex Knaperek	Jr
OL	68	Patrick Jewell	Jr
OL	69	Matthew Warkins	So
OL	70	Jeske Maples	Sr
OL	71	Ryan Kennelly	Sr
OL	72	Brock Nunez	Jr
OL	73	John Golden	Jr
OL	74	Eddie Valdes	So
OL	75	Nick Fehrle	Sr
OL	76	Dominik Palka	So
OL	79	Jorge Ortiz	So
WR	80	Brandon Woods	So
WR	81	Jake Lynch	GS
WR	82	Caleb Barclay	So
TE	83	Will Diamond	Fr
WR	84	Alexander Pratt	Sr
WR	85	Brody Hartig	So
TE	87	Isaac Banker	Sr
TE	89	Bobby Behmer	Sr

Defense

Pos.	#	Name	Class
DB	1	Jahron Williams	Sr
DB	2	Rahmareon Roby	Jr
DB	3	Jahmar Daniel	Jr
DB	4	Rory Hills	GS
DL	6	Jacob Vincent	So
LB	7	Angelo Cusumano	GS
DB	8	Kyler Green	So
DL	9	Martin Egbo	GS
DB	10	Zack Orr	GS
DB	11	Marcell Ellis	GS
DB	11	Kamil Kokot	Fr
DB	13	Kaden Hartnett	So
DB	15	Eddie Schmid	Sr
LB	16	Trevon Hunter	So
DB	17	Kelby James	Sr
DB	18	Austin Flax	GS
DB	19	Justin Obradovich	So
DB	20	Yasmani Rojas	Sr
DB	20	Yasneir Rojas	Fr
DB	21	Isaiah Mendoza	Fr
DB	22	Denarius Jackson	Fr
DB	23	Riley McCurdy	Sr
DB	24	Danny O'Malley	Fr
DB	25	Anton Cassell	Fr
DB	25	Brayden Garrigan	So
LB	26	Theo Millas	Jr
DB	27	Dakari Baldwin	Jr
DB	27	Kenny Rutherford	So
LB	28	Phillip Carlton	Fr
DB	29	Will Vernon	Sr
DB	31	Ethan Groark	Jr
DB	32	Charlie Lavery	So
LB	33	Danny Nuccio	Sr
LB	34	BJ Adamchik	GS
LB	35	Kachi Ugwu	So
DB	37	Alex Gil	Jr
DB	37	Gabriel Laughlin	So
LB	37	John Moore	Fr
DB	38	Fabian Alvarez	Sr
DB	39	Lucas Rossini	Fr
DB	40	Ethan Enriquez	Fr
LB	42	Augustus Winkler	Fr
DB	43	Jack Dettro	Fr
DL	43	Bobby Medina	So
DB	44	Galashky Blaise	So
LB	45	Gustav Tosterud	Jr
DB	47	Damarion Washington	Fr
DB	47	Alec Watrous	So
DB	49	Joey Gliatta	Fr
DB	49	Blake Ottow	Fr
LB	50	Charlie Egan	So
LB	50	AJ Mancilla	Fr
LB	52	Matt Janiak	Fr
LB	53	Drew Harp	Jr
DL	59	Noah Rapinchuk	Jr
DL	61	Corey Hotel	Fr
DL	62	Max Ness	Sr
DL	66	Jayden Dose	Fr
DL	67	Philip Dozier	Jr
DL	77	Myron Lewis	GS
DL	78	Shamus Straub	So
DL	90	Payton Allen	So
DL	91	Tucker Johnson	Fr
DL	92	John Sullivan	Jr
DL	94	Christian Miller	Sr
DL	95	Quinn Ahrens	So
DL	95	Eddie McLevige	Fr
DL	96	Chibueze Ibegbulem	Fr
DL	97	Cortez Jones	So
DL	98	Kendric Muhammad	Fr
DL	99	Graham Wight	So

Special teams

Pos.	#	Name	Class
K	36	Sean Ryniec	So
K	39	Sebastian Vybral	Fr
P	45	Chip Dose	So
K	48	Dom Scalera	So
K	51	Nathan Blazewski	Fr
LS	56	Nate Boylan	Fr
LS	61	Oscar Morgan	Sr
K	85	Andre Casas	So

Head coach

- Brad Spencer (3rd season)

Coordinators/assistant coaches

- Eric Stuedemann (offensive coordinator/offensive line)
- Shane Dierking (defensive coordinator/linebackers)
- Colin Wood (special teams coordinator/cornerbacks)
- Chris Allen (graduate assistant/wide receivers)
- Joe Fehrle (tight ends)
- Luke Foster (quarterbacks)
- Maviolo Grier (linebackers)
- Kyle Lane (graduate assistant/defensive line)
- Kalus Murphy (safeties)
- Chris Nendick (kicking specialist)
- DJ Warkenthien (defensive line)
- Jonas Waskosky (graduate assistant/running backs)

Legend

- (C) Team captain
- (S) Suspended
- (I) Ineligible
- Injured
- Redshirt

Roster
Last update: July 22, 2025

== Schedule ==
Date	Time	Opponent	Rank	Site	Result	Attendance	Source
September 14	6:00 p.m.	at No. 14 Aurora*	No. 1	Spartan Athletic Park; Montgomery, AL	W 48–21	3,743	
September 21	1:00 p.m.	at Carthage	No. 1	Art Keller Field; Kenosha, WI	W 63–0	1,553	
September 28	12:00 p.m.	Washington University	No. 1	Benedetti–Wehrli Stadium; Naperville, IL	W 49–9	4,000	
October 5	1:00 p.m.	at No. 18 Wheaton (IL)	No. 1	McCully Stadium; Wheaton, IL	W 55–27	5,337	
October 12	1:00 p.m.	at Millikin	No. 1	Frank M. Lindsay Field; Decatur, IL	W 70–14	475	
October 19	6:00 p.m.	North Park^{†}	No. 1	Benedetti–Wehrli Stadium; Naperville, IL	W 69–0	4,500	
October 26	1:00 p.m.	at Augustana (IL)	No. 1	Lindberg Stadium; Rock Island, IL	W 49–10	875	
November 2	12:00 p.m.	Carroll (WI)	No. 1	Benedetti–Wehrli Stadium; Naperville, IL	W 56–3	3,500	
November 9	12:00 p.m.	Elmhurst	No. 1	Benedetti–Wehrli Stadium; Naperville, IL	W 70–7	2,000	
November 16	1:00 p.m.	at Illinois Wesleyan	No. 1	Tucci Stadium; Bloomington, IL	W 42–20	2,238	
November 30	12:00 p.m.	No. 22 Whitworth*	No. 1	Benedetti–Wehrli Stadium; Naperville, IL (NCAA Division III Second Round)	W 42–17	761	
December 7	12:00 p.m.	No. 16 Hope*	No. 1	Benedetti–Wehrli Stadium; Naperville, IL (NCAA Division III Third Round)	W 41–21	1,491	
December 14	12:00 p.m.	No. 23 Springfield*	No. 1	Benedetti–Wehrli Stadium; Naperville, IL (NCAA Division III Quarterfinal)	W 27–3	942	
December 21	2:30 p.m.	No. 6 Susquehanna*	No. 1	Benedetti–Wehrli Stadium; Naperville, IL (NCAA Division III Semifinal)	W 66–0	1,206	
January 5, 2025	7:00 p.m.	vs. No. 5 Mount Union*	No. 1	Shell Energy Stadium; Houston, TX (Stagg Bowl)	W 41–25	1,938	
*Non-conference game; ^{†}Homecoming; Rankings from D3Football.com Poll released prior to the game; All times are in Eastern time

== Rankings ==
Ranking movements Legend: ( ) = First-place votes
	Week												
Poll	Pre	1	2	3	4	5	6	7	8	9	10	11	Final
D3football.com	1 (14)	1 (17)	1 (17)	1 (16)	1 (16)	1 (18)	1 (18)	1 (18)	1 (18)	1 (18)	1 (22)	1 (22)	1 (25)
AFCA	1 (26)	1 (28)	1 (33)	1 (33)	1 (36)	1 (36)	1 (36)	1 (36)	1 (37)	1 (36)	1 (38)	1 (38)	1 (43)

== Game summaries ==
=== At No. 14 Aurora ===
	1	2	3	4	Total
No. 1 Cardinals	17	17	7	7	48
No. 14 Spartans	0	7	14	0	21

Statistics	NCC	AUR
First downs	25	18
Total yards	463	372
Rushing yards	222	83
Passing yards	241	289
Turnovers	0	1
Time of possession	33:00	27:00

Team	Category	Player	Statistics
North Central	Passing	Luke Lehnen	21/31, 241 yards, 3 TD
North Central	Rushing	Joe Sacco	19 rushes, 146 yards, 3 TD
North Central	Receiving	Trey Madsen	6 receptions, 63 yards, TD
Aurora	Passing	Tyler Adkins	22/40, 289 yards, TD, INT
Aurora	Rushing	Tyler Adkins	8 rushes, 55 yards
Aurora	Receiving	Ty Pruett	4 receptions, 122 yards, TD

=== At Carthage ===
	1	2	3	4	Total
No. 1 Cardinals	7	21	14	21	63
Firebirds	0	0	0	0	0

Statistics	NCC	CAR
First downs	31	9
Total yards	629	146
Rushing yards	300	29
Passing yards	329	117
Turnovers	1	2
Time of possession	29:34	30:26

Team	Category	Player	Statistics
North Central	Passing	Luke Lehnen	16/25, 294 yards, 2 TD, INT
North Central	Rushing	Joe Sacco	16 rushes, 96 yards, 2 TD
North Central	Receiving	Thomas Skokna	2 receptions, 67 yards
Carthage	Passing	Bryce Lowe	21/33, 117 yards, 2 INT
Carthage	Rushing	Bryce Frank	10 rushes, 17 yards
Carthage	Receiving	Gavin Betts	4 receptions, 42 yards

=== Washington University ===
	1	2	3	4	Total
Bears					0
No. 1 Cardinals					0

Statistics	WASHU	NCC
First downs		
Total yards		
Rushing yards		
Passing yards		
Turnovers		
Time of possession		

Team	Category	Player	Statistics
Washington University	Passing		
Washington University	Rushing		
Washington University	Receiving		
North Central	Passing		
North Central	Rushing		
North Central	Receiving		

=== At No. 18 Wheaton (IL) ===
	1	2	3	4	Total
No. 1 Cardinals					0
No. 18 Thunder					0

Statistics	NCC	WHE
First downs		
Total yards		
Rushing yards		
Passing yards		
Turnovers		
Time of possession		

Team	Category	Player	Statistics
North Central	Passing		
North Central	Rushing		
North Central	Receiving		
Wheaton	Passing		
Wheaton	Rushing		
Wheaton	Receiving		

=== At Millikin ===
	1	2	3	4	Total
No. 1 Cardinals					0
Big Blue					0

Statistics	NCC	MIL
First downs		
Total yards		
Rushing yards		
Passing yards		
Turnovers		
Time of possession		

Team	Category	Player	Statistics
North Central	Passing		
North Central	Rushing		
North Central	Receiving		
Millikin	Passing		
Millikin	Rushing		
Millikin	Receiving		

=== North Park ===
	1	2	3	4	Total
Vikings					0
No. 1 Cardinals					0

Statistics	NPU	NCC
First downs		
Total yards		
Rushing yards		
Passing yards		
Turnovers		
Time of possession		

Team	Category	Player	Statistics
North Park	Passing		
North Park	Rushing		
North Park	Receiving		
North Central	Passing		
North Central	Rushing		
North Central	Receiving		

=== At Augustana (IL) ===
	1	2	3	4	Total
No. 1 Cardinals					0
Vikings					0

Statistics	NCC	AUG
First downs		
Total yards		
Rushing yards		
Passing yards		
Turnovers		
Time of possession		

Team	Category	Player	Statistics
North Central	Passing		
North Central	Rushing		
North Central	Receiving		
Augustana	Passing		
Augustana	Rushing		
Augustana	Receiving		

=== Carroll (WI) ===
	1	2	3	4	Total
Pioneers					0
No. 1 Cardinals					0

Statistics	CAR	NCC
First downs		
Total yards		
Rushing yards		
Passing yards		
Turnovers		
Time of possession		

Team	Category	Player	Statistics
Carroll	Passing		
Carroll	Rushing		
Carroll	Receiving		
North Central	Passing		
North Central	Rushing		
North Central	Receiving		

=== Elmhurst ===
	1	2	3	4	Total
Bluejays					0
No. 1 Cardinals					0

Statistics	ELM	NCC
First downs		
Total yards		
Rushing yards		
Passing yards		
Turnovers		
Time of possession		

Team	Category	Player	Statistics
Elmhurst	Passing		
Elmhurst	Rushing		
Elmhurst	Receiving		
North Central	Passing		
North Central	Rushing		
North Central	Receiving		

=== At Illinois Wesleyan ===
	1	2	3	4	Total
No. 1 Cardinals					0
Titans					0

Statistics	NCC	IWU
First downs		
Total yards		
Rushing yards		
Passing yards		
Turnovers		
Time of possession		

Team	Category	Player	Statistics
North Central	Passing		
North Central	Rushing		
North Central	Receiving		
Illinois Wesleyan	Passing		
Illinois Wesleyan	Rushing		
Illinois Wesleyan	Receiving		

=== No. 22 Whitworth (NCAA Division III Second Round) ===
	1	2	3	4	Total
No. 22 Pirates	0	3	0	14	17
No. 1 Cardinals	21	7	7	7	42

Statistics	WTW	NCC
First downs	16	20
Total yards	329	493
Rushing yards	99	350
Passing yards	230	143
Turnovers	1	0
Time of possession	31:01	28:59

Team	Category	Player	Statistics
Whitworth	Passing	Ryan Blair	29/48, 230 yards, TD, INT
Whitworth	Rushing	Nathan Owens	3 rushes, 56 yards, TD
Whitworth	Receiving	Dawson Tobeck	6 receptions, 54 yards
North Central	Passing	Luke Lehnen	10/13, 137 yards, 2 TD
North Central	Rushing	Joe Sacco	10 rushes, 198 yards, 2 TD
North Central	Receiving	Isaac Banker	1 reception, 54 yards

=== No. 16 Hope (NCAA Division III Third Round) ===
	1	2	3	4	Total
No. 16 Flying Dutchmen	0	7	7	7	21
No. 1 Cardinals	0	21	13	7	41

Statistics	HOPE	NCC
First downs	17	21
Total yards	334	486
Rushing yards	167	234
Passing yards	167	252
Turnovers	3	1
Time of possession	27:05	32:55

Team	Category	Player	Statistics
Hope	Passing	Ben Wellman	13/27, 167 yards, 2 TD, 2 INT
Hope	Rushing	Ben Wellman	11 rushes, 83 yards, TD
Hope	Receiving	Grant Holtzer	5 receptions, 103 yards, 2 TD
North Central	Passing	Luke Lehnen	13/18, 234 yards, 2 TD, INT
North Central	Rushing	Joe Sacco	19 rushes, 120 yards, TD
North Central	Receiving	Thomas Skokna	4 receptions, 119 yards, TD

=== No. 23 Springfield (NCAA Division III Quarterfinal) ===
	1	2	3	4	Total
No. 23 Pride	0	3	0	0	3
No. 1 Cardinals	7	10	3	7	27

Statistics	SPR	NCC
First downs	17	18
Total yards	260	328
Rushing yards	227	232
Passing yards	33	96
Turnovers	2	1
Time of possession	34:41	25:19

Team	Category	Player	Statistics
Springfield	Passing	Drew Heenan	3/10, 33 yards
Springfield	Rushing	Arsen Shtefan	20 rushes, 92 yards
Springfield	Receiving	Logan Schenk	1 reception, 20 yards
North Central	Passing	Luke Lehnen	10/20, 96 yards, 2 TD
North Central	Rushing	Sean Allen	15 rushes, 94 yards, TD
North Central	Receiving	Jack Rummell	2 receptions, 46 yards, TD

=== No. 6 Susquehanna (NCAA Division III Semifinal) ===
	1	2	3	4	Total
No. 6 River Hawks	0	0	0	0	0
No. 1 Cardinals	21	28	14	3	66

Statistics	SQH	NCC
First downs	5	32
Total yards	135	638
Rushing yards	60	352
Passing yards	75	286
Turnovers	3	1
Time of possession	23:59	36:01

Team	Category	Player	Statistics
Susquehanna	Passing	Bobby Croyle	4/9, 55 yards
Susquehanna	Rushing	Rahshan La Mons	14 rushes, 72 yards
Susquehanna	Receiving	Chris Bookter	1 reception, 25 yards
North Central	Passing	Luke Lehnen	16/17, 275 yards, 4 TD
North Central	Rushing	Jordan Williams	16 rushes, 106 yards, TD
North Central	Receiving	Jacob Paradee	3 receptions, 86 yards, 2 TD

=== Vs. No. 5 Mount Union (Stagg Bowl) ===
	1	2	3	4	Total
No. 5 Purple Raiders	7	3	7	8	25
No. 1 Cardinals	7	7	7	20	41

Statistics	UMU	NCC
First downs	23	25
Total yards	426	495
Rushing yards	112	197
Passing yards	314	298
Turnovers	0	1
Time of possession	29:32	30:28

Team	Category	Player	Statistics
Mount Union	Passing	T. J. Deshields	21/36, 314 yards, 2 TD
Mount Union	Rushing	Tyler Echeverry	20 rushes, 83 yards, TD
Mount Union	Receiving	Nick Turner	7 receptions, 104 yards, TD
North Central	Passing	Luke Lehnen	18/26, 298 yards, 4 TD
North Central	Rushing	Charles Coleman	2 rushes, 68 yards, TD
North Central	Receiving	Thomas Skokna	3 receptions, 94 yards
