= 2025 Stagg Bowl =

NCAA Division III college football championship game

2025 NCAA Division III Football Championship
- Stagg Bowl LI
Mount Union Purple Raiders	North Central Cardinals
(13–0)	(13–0)
OAC	CCIW
25	41
Head coach: Geoff Dartt	Head coach: Brad Spencer
	1	2	3	4	Total
Mount Union	7	3	7	8	25
North Central	7	7	7	20	41
- Date: January 5, 2025
- Season: 2024
- Stadium: Shell Energy Stadium
- Location: Houston, Texas
- MVP: Luke Lehnen, QB, North Central
- Referee: Steven Gorski (LC)
- Attendance: 1,938

United States TV coverage
- Network: ESPN/ESPN+

International TV coverage
- Network: Canada: TSN+

The 2025 NCAA Division III Football Championship Game, more commonly referred to as the 2025 Stagg Bowl or Stagg Bowl LI, was a postseason college football played on January 5, 2025, at Shell Energy Stadium in Houston, Texas. It determined a national champion in NCAA Division III for the 2024 season. The game began at 8:00 p.m. EST, and aired on ESPN and ESPN+. The game featured the two finalists of the 40-team single elimination playoff bracket, Mount Union and North Central; North Central won 41–25 to claim their third national championship.

== Teams ==
The participants of the 2024 NCAA Division III Football Championship Game are the finalists of the 2024 Division III Playoffs, a 40-team single elimination brackets tournament which began on November 16. The winners of each of the four 10-team regions qualified for the national semifinals.

=== National semifinals ===
Semifinals; December 21; Asterisk denotes host
Susquehanna	0
*	North Central	66
Johns Hopkins	37
*	Mount Union	45

National Championship; January 5, 2025; Shell Energy Stadium, Houston, Texas
North Central	41
Mount Union	25

== Game summary ==
2025 Stagg Bowl

Quarter	1	2	3	4	Total
No. 5 Mount Union	7	3	7	8	25
No. 1 North Central	7	7	7	20	41

at Shell Energy Stadium • Houston, Texas

- Date: Sunday, January 5, 2025
- Game time: 7:00 p.m. CST
- Game weather: Sunny
- Game attendance: 1,938
- Referee: Steven Gorski
- TV: ESPN/ESPN+

Game information
First quarter
- UMU – Tyler Echeverry 24-yard run (Ivan Maric kick), 8:30. Purple Raiders 7–0. Drive: 8 plays, 57 yards, 4:19.
- NCC – Myles Walton 24-yard pass from Luke Lehnen (Sean Ryniec kick), 4:35. Tied 7–7. Drive: 7 plays, 72 yards, 3:48.

Second quarter

- NCC – Luke Lehnen 16-yard run (Sean Ryniec kick), 8:09. Cardinals 14–7. Drive: 11 plays, 88 yards, 5:17.
- UMU – Ivan Maric 30-yard field goal, 3:57. Cardinals 14–10. Drive: 7 plays, 52 yards, 4:07.

Third quarter

- NCC – Jacob Paradee 1-yard pass from Luke Lehnen (Sean Ryniec kick), 5:57. Cardinals 21–10. Drive: 7 plays, 80 yards, 4:01.
- UMU – Nick Turner 31-yard pass from T. J. Deshields (Ivan Maric kick), 3:17. Cardinals 21–17. Drive: 6 plays, 75 yards, 2:40.

Fourth quarter

- NCC – Jack Rummell 6-yard pass from Luke Lehnen (Sean Ryniec kick), 14:18. Cardinals 28–17. Drive: 7 plays, 51 yards, 3:49.
- UMU – Jerry Cooper 54-yard pass from T. J. Deshields (T. J. Deshields pass to Drew Sims), 13:37. Cardinals 28–25. Drive: 2 plays, 55 yards, 0:32.
- NCC – Charles Coleman 66-yard run (kick blocked), 12:41. Cardinals 34–25. Drive: 3 plays, 75 yards, 0:56.
- NCC – Jacob Paradee 12-yard pass from Luke Lehnen (Sean Ryniec kick), 2:32. Cardinals 41–25. Drive: 15 plays, 92 yards, 6:54.

=== Statistics ===
Statistics	UMU	NCC
First downs	23	25
Plays–yards	64–426	63–495
Rushes–yards	28–112	37–197
Passing yards	314	298
Passing: comp–att–int	21–36–0	18–26–0
Time of possession	29:32	30:28

Team	Category	Player	Statistics
Mount Union	Passing	T. J. Deshields	21/36, 314 yards, 2 TD
Mount Union	Rushing	Tyler Echeverry	20 rushes, 83 yards, TD
Mount Union	Receiving	Nick Turner	7 receptions, 104 yards, TD
North Central	Passing	Luke Lehnen	18/26, 298 yards, 4 TD
North Central	Rushing	Charles Coleman	2 rushes, 68 yards, TD
North Central	Receiving	Thomas Skokna	3 receptions, 94 yards
