= 2024 Wartburg Knights football team =

American college football season

2024 Wartburg Knights football

ARC champion

NCAA Division III Third Round, L 14–24 vs Bethel (MN)
- Conference: American Rivers Conference

Ranking
- AFCA: No. 12
- D3Football.com: No. 13
- Record: 10–2 (8–0 ARC)
- Head coach: Chris Winter (4th season)
- Offensive coordinator: Matt Wheeler (14th season)
- Defensive coordinator: Matt Tschetter (4th season)
- Home stadium: Walston-Hoover Stadium

2024 American Rivers Conference football standings
	Conf.			Overall
Team	W		L	W		L
No. 13 Wartburg $^	8	–	0	10	–	2
Coe ^	7	–	1	9	–	2
Central (IA)	6	–	2	8	–	2
Dubuque	5	–	3	5	–	5
Simpson (IA)	4	–	4	5	–	5
Nebraska Wesleyan	2	–	6	3	–	7
Buena Vista	2	–	6	2	–	8
Loras	2	–	6	2	–	8
Luther	0	–	8	1	–	9
$ – Conference champion; ^ – NCAA Division III playoff participant; Rankings from D3football.com

The 2024 Wartburg Knights football team represents Wartburg College as a member of the American Rivers Conference (ARC) during the 2024 NCAA Division III football season. Led by fourth-year head coach Chris Winter, the Knights play home games at Walston-Hoover Stadium in Waverly, Iowa.

The Knights won their 20th conference championship and 3rd straight in 2024. Their season would come to an end in the third round of the NCAA playoffs to Bethel (MN). Chris Winter was named the conference coach of the year for the 3rd straight year, along with Parker Rochford being named defensive player of the year(DPOY). The Knights have had the DPOY in the ARC 3 years running.

== Schedule ==
Wartburg's 2024 regular season schedule consists of four home, with six on the road.

Date	Time	Opponent	Rank	Site	Result	Attendance
September 7	7:00 p.m.	at Monmouth (IL)*	No. 4	April Zorn Stadium and Woll Memorial Field; Monmouth, IL	W 38–24	3150
September 14	1:00 p.m.	at No. 12 Saint John's (MN)*	No. 5	Clemens Stadium; Collegeville, MN	L 13–35	9,529
September 21	1:00 p.m.	at Central (IA)	No. 13	Ron and Joyce Schipper Stadium; Pella, IA	W 10–6	1,500
September 28	1:00 p.m.	Nebraska Wesleyan	No. 13	Walston-Hoover Stadium; Waverly, IA	W 34–0	2,301
October 12	1:00 p.m.	at Buena Vista	No. 16	J. Leslie Rollins Stadium and Peterson Field; Storm Lake, IA	W 70–21	520
October 19	1:30 p.m.	Simpson^{†}	No. 12	Walston-Hoover Stadium; Waverly, IA	W 46–21	6,125
October 26	1:00 p.m.	at Coe	No. 13	Clark Field; Cedar Rapids, IA	W 14–7	2,156
November 2	1:00 p.m.	Luther	No. 12	Walston-Hoover Stadium; Waverly, IA	W 49–10	4,250
November 9	1:00 p.m.	at Dubuque	No. 12	Chalmers Field; Dubuque, IA	W 24–14	1,250
November 16	1:00 p.m.	Loras	No. 11	Walston-Hoover Stadium; Waverly, IA	W 69–14	3,501
November 30	12:00 p.m.	No. 7 Wisconsin–Platteville*	No. 11	Walston-Hoover Stadium; Waverly, IA (NCAA Division III Second Round)	W 19–14	3,715
December 7	12:00 p.m.	No. 21 Bethel (MN)*	No. 11	Walston-Hoover Stadium; Waverly, IA (NCAA Division III Third Round)	L 14–24	5,214
*Non-conference game; ^{†}Homecoming; Rankings from D3Football.com Poll released prior to the game; All times are in central time

== Rankings ==
Ranking movements Legend: ██ Increase in ranking ██ Decrease in ranking
	Week												
Poll	Pre	1	2	3	4	5	6	7	8	9	10	11	Final
D3football.com	4	5	13	13	13	16	12	13	12	12	11	11	13
AFCA	4	6	15	16	15	15	13	12	11	11	11	10	12

== Roster ==
2024 Wartburg Knights football team roster
Players
Coaches
Offense

Pos.	#	Name	Class
WR	1	Brock Califf	Sr
WR	2	Ben Wymer	So
WR	3	Declan Fortuna	Fr
WR	4	Drake George	Sr
WR	5	Trey Eagle	Sr
WR	6	Caleb Egesdal	So
QB	7	Carter Markham	Sr
QB	7	Zachary Randl	Fr
WR	8	Justis Bachman	So
WR	8	Carter Reinbold	Fr
QB	8	Tyler Shaner	Fr
WR	10	Carter Henry	Sr
WR	10	Preston Moriarity	Fr
QB	10	Charlie Zimmerman	Fr
QB	11	Riley Richards	Sr
QB	11	Jett Scott	Fr
QB	12	Josh Papesh	Fr
WR	15	Ty Gardner	Fr
WR	16	Jagger Schmitt	Jr
WR	17	Dylan Swanstrom	So
QB	18	Leo Dodd	Jr
RB	20	Chris Heard	Fr
RB	21	Ben Bryant	Sr
RB	22	Dakota Johnson	Fr
RB	23	Theodor Kolie	Fr
RB	25	Nahir Aguirre	Fr
WR	25	Blake Ferris	Fr
RB	26	Spencer Zinn	Jr
RB	27	Dylan Marti	So
RB	28	Bricen White	Sr
RB	31	Joey Anderson	Jr
RB	34	Carson Bruns	Fr
RB	35	Levi Pingel	Jr
RB	36	Gavin Barta	Fr
RB	36	Dawson Rud	So
TE	38	Simon Ott	So
TE	41	John McConohy	Sr
TE	43	Micah Holmberg	Jr
RB	44	CJ Hisler	So
TE	46	Austin Barta	Sr
TE	48	Thaden Abbas	Fr
RB	48	Mario D'Orazio	Fr
OL	50	Cole Hotz	Jr
OL	51	Will Conlan	Sr
OL	52	Ben Petlon	Sr
OL	55	Carter Seliger	Fr
OL	57	Caden Hankins	Fr
OL	57	Andrew Kato	Fr
OL	60	Max Rossow	So
OL	60	Brady Weepie	So
OL	61	Braden Plotz	Fr
OL	61	Samuel Wirstrom	Fr
OL	62	Drew Streb	Fr
OL	63	Reese Theobald	Jr
OL	64	Jason Koopmann	Jr
OL	65	Brandt Reints	So
OL	65	Cooper Smock	Sr
OL	66	Cade Carpenter	Sr
OL	67	Kellen Kpogli	So
OL	68	Ethan Stockwell	Sr
OL	69	Nathan Lorenzen	Jr
OL	70	Josh Reichard	So
OL	72	Jaydon Boynton	Fr
OL	72	Lars Landa	Fr
OL	73	Xander Bradley	Sr
OL	74	Jackson Woodley	So
OL	75	Isaac Bender	Sr
OL	75	Brady Robinson	So
OL	76	Clayton Bockhoven	So
OL	76	Isaiah Corbin	Sr
OL	77	Tucker Kinney	Sr
OL	77	Jesse Nevarez	So
OL	78	Cole Mahnke	So
OL	79	Wyatt Miles	Fr
TE	80	Kaden Behrens	Jr
WR	80	Elijah Mendoza	So
WR	81	Topher Bigalk	So
TE	81	Jake Schulz	Fr
WR	82	Caleb Beck	So
WR	82	Tai Streets	Jr
WR	83	Kaiden Griffith	Fr
WR	83	Henry Morris	Fr
WR	83	Max Solis	Sr
WR	84	Tucker Mumford	Sr
TE	85	Matt Dufoe	Jr
WR	85	Brayden Lane	So
TE	86	Matthew Hilleman	So
WR	87	Jack Eddy	So
WR	87	Cade Hughes	Jr
WR	88	Carter Bussanmas	Sr
WR	89	Tyler Ott	Sr
TE	96	Olin Stockwell	Fr
QB		Quintin Loeb	So
QB		Lincoln Sauser	Fr

Defense

Pos.	#	Name	Class
DB	2	Grant McCallips	Sr
LB	3	Nate Link	Sr
DB	3	Jack Wilson	So
DB	4	Cam Stephens	Fr
DB	5	Kaleb Lamphier	Sr
DB	6	Blake Janssen	Jr
DB	7	Matthew Tarr	Fr
DB	9	Ben Parker	Sr
DB	11	Kaden Kobliska	Fr
DB	12	Kaiden Knaack	Fr
DB	12	Tyge Lyon	Fr
DB	13	Thane Alexander	Sr
DB	14	Parker Rochford	Sr
DB	15	Grant Larson	Sr
DB	15	Carter Lavender	Fr
DB	19	Jason O'Boye	So
DB	20	Conner Grover	Jr
DB	20	Jordan Juma	Fr
DB	21	Dylan McCaulley	So
LB	22	Sam Conway	Jr
DB	22	Rory Prazak II	Fr
DB	23	Ryan Folkerts	Jr
LB	24	Adam Link	So
DB	25	Calem Maclearn	Sr
DB	27	Korbin Barck	Jr
DB	28	Logan Jungling	So
DB	29	Sam Roose	So
DB	30	DJ Witt	Sr
DB	32	Ryan Doyle	So
LB	33	Keenan Tyler	Jr
LB	34	Tyler Gayer	So
LB	34	Andrew Kline	Fr
LB	36	Christian Pettinger	Fr
LB	37	McKade Munn	Jr
DB	39	Nick Woods	Fr
LB	40	Mac Watts	Jr
DL	42	Justin Grieff	Sr
DB	45	Brandon Christofferson	Fr
LB	45	Zack Crawford	So
LB	47	Colin Snitker	Jr
LB	48	Alex Koch	Jr
LB	49	Seth Madden	So
DL	51	Aiden Mauer	So
LB	52	Tyler Bark	Fr
LB	52	Cole Wiemers	Fr
LB	53	Jack Heinberg	Jr
LB	54	Trent Roberts	Jr
LB	54	Kale Rodgers	Sr
LB	55	Derek Hoerner	Fr
DL	55	Conner McDonald	So
LB	56	Kaden Bibler	Jr
DL	56	Luke Dunlap	Fr
LB	56	Colin Patterson	Fr
LB	58	Brady Cannon	Fr
DL	58	Collin Schulz	Fr
DL	59	Rune Boyd	Fr
LB	59	AJ Phelps	Fr
DL	62	Jacob Stolz	Fr
DL	63	Drew Jackson	So
DL	68	Ethan Berding	So
DL	71	Kale Folkerts	Sr
DL	72	Ethan Schellhorn	Sr
DL	73	Aiden Roberson	So
DL	74	TJ Webber	So
DL	79	Andrew Rhodes	Fr
DL	90	Jack Drahos	Jr
DL	91	Walker Hermeier	Sr
DL	91	Reese Trepanier	Fr
DL	93	Parker Ehrenfelt	Fr
DL	93	Nolan Lamphier	Fr
DL	93	Griffin Neal	Sr
DL	94	Grant Higgins	Sr
DL	95	Cooper Johnston	Jr
DL	95	Brady Peterson	So
DL	96	Indiana Ferguson	Fr
DL	96	Cam Stalzer	Jr
DL	97	Owen Hatcher	Sr
DL	98	Jake Walker	So
DL	99	Christian Nunley	Sr
DL		Landon Coleman	Fr
LB		Alex Jansen	Fr
DL		Charlie Niegsch	Fr

Special teams

Pos.	#	Name	Class
K	0	Cael O'Neill	Sr
K	4	Keegan Weber	Fr
K	23	Jackson Othmer	Fr
K/P	39	Jaxson Hoppes	Jr
K	39	Jacob Kamara	Fr
K	45	Andrew Tollefson	Fr
P	52	Ben Petlon	Sr
LS	58	Austin Souhrada	Fr
LS	79	Parker Sperfslage	So
LS	91	AJ Hallman	Fr

Head coach

- Chris Winter

Coordinators/assistant coaches

- Matt Wheeler – Offensive Coordinator/Assistant Head Coach/Quarterbacks
- Matt Tschetter – Defensive Coordinator/Linebackers/Recruiting Coordinator
- Luke Summers – Offensive Line
- Ethan Lape – Defensive Line
- Matt Buckner – Wide Receivers
- Jawanza Holmes – Running Backs
- Jeff Beck – Offensive Assistant
- Paul Mugan – Tight Ends
- Steve Kingery – Specialists
- Alex Pollock – Linebackers
- Tom Butters – Tight Ends
- Jason Splitt – Defensive Assistant/Student Coach
- Grant Halverson – Offensive Assistant/Student Coach
- Dakota Stevenson – Defensive Assistant/Student Coach
- Mac Smigielski – Offensive Assistant/Student Coach
- Jacob Lord – Offensive Assistant/Student Coach
- Danny Drees – Athletic Trainer
- Jessica Albright – Athletic Trainer

Legend

- (C) Team captain
- (S) Suspended
- (I) Ineligible
- Injured
- Redshirt

Roster
Last update: June 4, 2025

== Awards and honors ==
Individual awards
Player	Award
Parker Rochford	ARC Defensive Player of the Year; AFCA 2nd team All-American; AP 1st team All-American; D3football.com 2nd team All-American
Tucker Kinney	AFCA 1st team All-American; AP 1st team All-American; D3football.com 2nd team All-American
Coach	Award
Chris Winter	ARC Coach of the year

All-Conference
Player	Position	Team	Year
Thane Alexander	DB	1	SR
Justin Grieff	DL	1	SR
Keenan Tyler	LB	1	JR
Parker Rochford	DB	1	SR
Ethan Stockwell	OL	1	SR
Dawson Rud	RB	1	SO
Tucker Kinney	OT	1	SR
Ben Bryant	RS	1	SR
Christian Nunley	DL	2	SR
Will Conlan	OL	2	SR
Carter Henry	WR	2	SR
Carter Markham	QB	2	SR
Cael O'Neill	K	2	SR
Jaxson Hoppes	P	HM	SO
Kaleb Lamphier	DB	HM	SR
John McConohy	TE	HM	SR
Austin Souhrada	LS	HM	FR
Mac Watts	LB	HM	JR
Jake Walker	DL	HM	SO
HM = Honorable mention. Reference:
