= Matt Janus =

American football coach (born c. 1987)

Current position
- Title: Head coach
- Team: Northern Michigan
- Conference: GLIAC
- Record: 2–9

Biographical details
- Born: c. 1987 (age 38–39); Lake Zurich, Illinois, U.S.
- Education: University of Wisconsin–Platteville (2010, 2016)

Playing career
- 2006–2009: Wisconsin–Platteville

Coaching career (HC unless noted)
- 2010: Wisconsin–Platteville (GA)
- 2011–2013: Sheboygan Falls HS (WI) (DC)
- 2014–2015: Wisconsin–Platteville (DL)
- 2016: Wisconsin–Platteville (co-DC)
- 2017–2019: Wisconsin–La Crosse (DC)
- 2020–2025: Wisconsin–La Crosse
- 2026–present: Northern Michigan

Head coaching record
- Overall: 47–23
- Tournaments: 5–5 (NCAA D-III playoffs)

Accomplishments and honors

Championships
- 2 WIAC (2022, 2023)

Awards
- 2× WIAC Coach of the Year (2022, 2023)

Matt Janus (born c. 1987) is an American college football coach. He is the head football coach for the Northern Michigan University, a position he has held since 2026. Previously, he was the head of University of Wisconsin-La Crosse from 2020 to 2025. He also coached for Wisconsin–Platteville and Sheboygan Falls High School. He played college football for Wisconsin–Platteville.

== Head coaching record ==
Year	Team	Overall	Conference	Standing	Bowl/playoffs	D3^{#}	AFCA^{°}
Wisconsin–La Crosse Eagles (Wisconsin Intercollegiate Athletic Conference) (2020–2025)
2020–21	No team—COVID-19						
2021	Wisconsin–La Crosse	9–3	6–1	2nd	L NCAA Division III Second Round	11	12
2022	Wisconsin–La Crosse	9–2	6–1	T–1st	L NCAA Division III First Round	12	11
2023	Wisconsin–La Crosse	11–2	7–0	1st	L NCAA Division III Quarterfinal	4	4
2024	Wisconsin–La Crosse	8–4	5–2	2nd	L NCAA Division III Second Round	21	21
2025	Wisconsin–La Crosse	8–3	5–2	T–2nd	L NCAA Division III Third Round	8	10
Wisconsin–La Crosse:		45–14	29–6				
Northern Michigan Wildcats (Great Lakes Intercollegiate Athletic Conference) (2026–present)
2026	Northern Michigan	2–9	2–5	6th			
Northern Michigan:		2–9	2–5				
Total:		47–23					
National championship Conference title Conference division title or championship game berth
