= 2024 Saint John's Johnnies football team =

American college football season

2024 Saint John's Johnnies football

MIAC champion MIAC Northwoods Division champion

MIAC Championship Game, W 41–33 vs. Bethel (MN)

NCAA Division III Third Round, L 38–41 vs. Susquehanna
- Conference: Minnesota Intercollegiate Athletic Conference
- Northwoods Division

Ranking
- AFCA: No. 4
- D3Football.com: No. 3
- Record: 11–1 (8–0 MIAC)
- Head coach: Gary Fasching (11th season)
- Offensive coordinator: Kole Heckendorf (7th season)
- Defensive coordinator: Brandon Novak (1st season)
- Home stadium: Clemens Stadium

2024 Minnesota Intercollegiate Athletic Conference football standings
	Div			Conf.			Overall
Team	W		L	W		L	W		L
Northwoods Division
No. 3 Saint John's (MN) xy$^	4	–	0	8	–	0	11	–	1
St. Olaf	2	–	2	5	–	3	7	–	3
Carleton	2	–	2	4	–	4	5	–	5
Gustavus Adolphus	2	–	2	4	–	4	5	–	5
St. Scholastica	0	–	4	3	–	5	4	–	6
Skyline Division
No. 21 Bethel (MN) xy^	4	–	0	6	–	2	11	–	3
Concordia–Moorhead	3	–	1	6	–	2	7	–	3
Augsburg	2	–	2	3	–	5	4	–	6
Hamline	1	–	3	1	–	7	3	–	7
Macalester	0	–	4	0	–	8	0	–	10
Championship: Saint John's (MN) 41, Bethel (MN) 33
$ – Conference champion; x – Division champion/co-champions; y – Championship game participant; ^ – NCAA Division III playoff participant; Rankings from D3Football.com

The 2024 Saint John's Johnnies football team represents Saint John's University as a member of the Northwoods Division of the Minnesota Intercollegiate Athletic Conference (MIAC) during the 2024 NCAA Division III football season. The Johnnies are led by 11th-year head coach Gary Fasching. The team plays home games at Clemens Stadium in Collegeville, Minnesota.

== Schedule ==
Saint John's announced its 2024 regular season schedule on February 14, 2024. It consists of six home games and four away games. On November 17, 2024, it was announced that the Johnnies received the number one overall seed into the NCAA Division III Playoffs, and will have a bye in the first round of the tournament. Saint John's hosted a second round game on November 30, and will host a third round game on December 7.

Date	Time	Opponent	Rank	Site	TV	Result	Attendance
September 7	1:00 p.m.	Carthage*	No. 14	Clemens Stadium; Collegeville, MN		W 49–0	8,679
September 14	1:00 p.m.	No. 5 Wartburg*	No. 12	Clemens Stadium; Collegeville, MN		W 35–13	9,529
September 28	1:00 p.m.	at No. 24 Bethel (MN)	No. 5	Royal Stadium; Arden Hills, MN		W 45–20	6,982
October 5	1:00 p.m.	Augsburg^{†}	No. 5	Clemens Stadium; Collegeville, MN		W 45–20	11,719
October 12	1:00 p.m.	at Concordia–Moorhead	No. 3	Jake Christiansen Stadium; Moorhead, MN		W 38–31	2,491
October 19	1:00 p.m.	at Carleton	No. 3	Laird Stadium; Northfield, MN		W 48–7	712
October 26	1:00 p.m.	Gustavus Adolphus	No. 3	Clemens Stadium; Collegeville, MN		W 34–0	11,514
November 2	1:00 p.m.	at St. Scholastica	No. 3	Walt Hunting Stadium; Duluth, MN		W 70–0	
November 9	1:00 p.m.	St. Olaf	No. 3	Clemens Stadium; Collegeville, MN		W 55–6	5,790
November 16	12:00 p.m.	No. 24 Bethel (MN)	No. 3	Clemens Stadium; Collegeville, MN (MIAC Championship Week)		W 41–33	8,639
November 30	12:00 p.m.	No. 18 Wisconsin–La Crosse*	No. 3	Clemens Stadium; Collegeville, MN (NCAA Division III Second Round)	ESPN+	W 24–13	3,117
December 7	12:00 p.m.	No. 6 Susquehanna*	No. 3	Clemens Stadium; Collegeville, MN (NCAA Division III Third Round)	ESPN+	L 38–41	4,605
*Non-conference game; ^{†}Homecoming; Rankings from D3Football.com Poll released prior to the game; All times are in central time; Source:

== Rankings ==
Ranking movements Legend: ██ Increase in ranking ██ Decrease in ranking
	Week												
Poll	Pre	1	2	3	4	5	6	7	8	9	10	11	Final
D3football.com	14	12	6	5	5	3	3	3	3	3	3	3	7
AFCA	14	12	7	4	4	4	4	4	4	4	4	4	7

== Roster ==
2024 Saint John's Johnnies football team roster
Players
Coaches
Offense

Pos.	#	Name	Class
TE	0	Joey Gendreau	Jr
WR	1	Marselio Mendez	Sr
RB	2	Takhi Vaughn	Jr
WR	2	Dylan Wheeler	Jr
QB	3	Zander Dittbenner	Jr
WR	4	Riley Schwellenbach	So
WR	5	Joey Moberg	Sr
QB	6	Aaron Syverson	Sr
RB	7	Mason Delzer	Fr
WR	7	Brady VanErp	Sr
WR	8	Sam Nolan	So
QB	9	Lucas Jansky	Jr
WR	9	Sam Ovsak	Fr
WR	10	Zach Roebuck	Jr
QB	11	Leyton Riviere	Fr
QB	12	Reece Dawson	Fr
QB	13	Nirvaan Yogarajah	Fr
WR	14	David Duplantier	Fr
QB	15	Landen Mickelson	Fr
QB	16	Jake Deutschman	Jr
WR	16	Thomas Jacobs	So
WR	17	Faaris Amegankpoe	Sr
WR	18	Caden Caligiuri	So
WR	19	Owen Amrhein	Jr
WR	20	Wyatt Sawatzke	Jr
RB	21	Dylan Kirchner	So
RB	22	Jaxson Sawyer	So
WR	24	John Hawkins	Jr
RB	24	Wyatt McCabe	Fr
WR	26	Mike Barry	Fr
WR	27	A. J. Loch	Sr
RB	27	Caden Wheeler	Jr
RB	28	Quinn Christoffersen	Sr
RB	29	Andrew Flaten	Fr
RB	30	Corey Bohmert	So
RB	32	Andy Becker	Fr
RB	33	Will Blakey	So
RB	34	Tyler Hoheisel	So
WR	35	Michael Beckius	Fr
WR	38	Ryan Warford	So
WR	39	Andrew Schaffer	So
RB	43	Maverick Harper	Fr
OL	50	Nick McKenzie	Sr
OL	51	Barrett Van Deun	So
OL	52	Colton Rada	So
OL	53	Spencer Gustin	Sr
OL	54	Grant Peroutka	Sr
OL	55	Tom Soler	Sr
OL	56	Eddie Reece	Jr
OL	57	Shane Atz	Jr
OL	58	Joe Duerr	Fr
OL	59	Joey Nelson	Fr
OL	60	Ian DeGross	Jr
OL	61	Matt Peterson	So
OL	62	Charlie Brophy	So
OL	62	Isaak Nowak	So
OL	63	Joe Vascellaro	Sr
OL	64	Hunter Nething	Fr
OL	65	Sean Lew	Sr
OL	66	Luke Wright	Jr
OL	70	Alex Markgraf	Jr
OL	71	Thomas Graves	Fr
OL	72	Charlie Folkens	Sr
OL	73	Diego Hurtado	Fr
OL	74	Ethan Lincoln	So
OL	75	Josh Quirk	Fr
OL	76	Zeke Conner	Fr
OL	77	Mikey Oftedahl	Fr
OL	78	Michael Bougie	So
OL	79	Tommy Hessburg	Sr
TE	80	Will Mathiasen	Fr
TE	81	Graham Beltrand	Sr
TE	82	Dom DiMaggio	So
WR	83	Eddie Don	Fr
TE	84	E. J. Hosty	So
WR	86	Cade Berg	So
WR	87	Josh Delange	Jr
TE	88	Charlie Plum	Jr
TE	89	Andrew Harren	So

Defense

Pos.	#	Name	Class
DL	1	Joe Akoh	Sr
DB	1	Alex Hart	Fr
DB	2	Nolan Dumonceaux	Fr
LB	3	Cooper Yaggie	Sr
DB	4	Will Peroutka	Fr
LB	5	Landon Danner	Fr
DB	5	Graham Gerlach	Sr
DB	6	Isaac Potter	Jr
DB	7	Evan Wahlin	Jr
DB	8	Peyton Goettlicher	So
DB	9	Westin Hoyt	Fr
DB	10	Mateo Cisneros	Sr
DB	11	Noah Arneson	Jr
DL	11	Carson Ray	Fr
DB	12	Logan Jans	So
DB	13	Landon Weyer	Fr
LB	14	Alex Harren	Jr
DL	15	Charlie King	Fr
DB	15	Caden Renslow	So
DB	16	Blake Simonson	Jr
DB	17	Vincent Pyne	So
DB	18	Will Seymour	Fr
DB	19	Daylen Cummings	Fr
LB	19	Adam Schavey	So
DB	20	Hudson Poole	Fr
DB	21	Jalen Crowley	Fr
LB	21	Nolan Rueter	Sr
LB	22	Andrew Lipke	Fr
DB	22	Charlie Ryks	Jr
LB	23	Aiden McMahon	So
DL	24	Mitch Vener	Jr
LB	25	Zachariah Hunter	Jr
DB	26	Jack Savasten	Sr
DB	28	Ryan Sanvik	Sr
DB	29	Cage Linton	Sr
DB	30	Darby Boelter	Fr
LB	30	Will Diana	Fr
DB	31	Dylan Hanson	So
LB	31	Mason McKelvy	Fr
DB	32	Bailey Evans	Fr
LB	32	Jake Schwinghammer	Sr
DB	33	Jack St. Fleur	Jr
DB	34	Drew Bramlett	Sr
DL	35	Josh Muehlbauer	So
DB	36	Clay Wolf	Fr
DB	37	Kaeden Carter	Fr
LB	37	Zach Helfmann	So
DB	38	Mason Hughes	Fr
LB	39	D. J. Myles	Sr
DB	40	Blake Ehlert	Sr
DL	40	Isaac Hetland	Sr
LB	41	Beau Boudreaux	So
DL	42	Robbie Burslem	Fr
LB	43	Hayden Sanders	Sr
DL	44	Andrew Molenaar	Jr
DB	45	Joey Greenagel	Fr
DL	45	Vinny Wanda	Jr
LB	46	Ben Dahl	Sr
LB	47	Jalen Graham	Fr
DB	47	Liam O'Malley	Sr
LB	48	Jack Bjork	Sr
LB	49	Cooper Nelson	Fr
LB	50	J. P. Weber	So
LB	51	Henry Bendickson	So
LB	52	Tanner Gelinas	Fr
LB	53	Kaden Lukkes	Jr
DL	53	Dawson Van Meter	Sr
LB	54	Eric Jurek	So
DL	55	Alex Larson	Fr
LB	56	Kellen O'Keefe	Fr
LB	57	Austin Wisdom	Fr
LB	59	Jayden Leach	Jr
LB	60	Jackson Carlson	So
LB	61	Emilio Velishek	Fr
DL	66	Will Mahowald	So
DL	67	Grady Minnerath	Fr
DL	70	Caleb Thom	Jr
DL	71	Cam Cortright	Fr
DL	73	Jack Krza	Jr
DL	74	Jawahn Cockfield	Fr
DL	81	Logan Gass	Fr
DL	82	Etah Akoh	Sr
DL	83	Alex Lundebrek	Sr
DL	85	Braden Sotis	Fr
DL	86	Tim Johnson	Fr
DL	87	Jordan Borgeson	Sr
DL	88	Alex Wimmer	Fr
DL	89	Michael Kasel	Fr
DL	90	Landon Gallagher	Sr
DL	91	Ben Thorman	Fr
DL	92	Chandler Obering	Jr
DL	93	Riley DeRosier	Jr
DL	94	Ben Karr	Jr
DL	95	Travis Johnson	Sr
LB	96	Riley Kangas	Sr
DL	97	Zach Frank	Sr
DL	98	Tommy Gilmore	Sr
DL	99	Cole Engen	Jr

Special teams

Pos.	#	Name	Class
K	12	Conor Murphy	Sr
P	18	Spencer Ell	Sr
LS	49	Caelan McKean	Fr
K/P	90	Matt Hansen	So
K/P	92	Thomas Theising	Fr
K/P	93	Ashton Hecksel	So

Head coach

- Gary Fasching

Coordinators/assistant coaches

- Brandon Novak – Defensive Coordinator/Defensive Backs
- Kole Heckendorf – Offensive Coordinator/Receivers
- Damien Dumonceaux – Recruiting Coordinator/Defensive Line/Special Teams
- Josh Bungum – Running Backs
- Mike Manguson – Offensive Line
- Ben Eli – Offensive line
- Max Jackson – Defensive Assistant/Diversity & Student Success
- Alexi Johnson – Kickers
- Andy Auger – Volunteer Assistant/Defense
- Collin Franz – Defensive Assistant/Defensive Line
- Tom Wicka – Volunteer Assistant/Linebackers
- Graydon Kulick – Quarterbacks
- Alex Larson – Tight Ends

Legend

- (C) Team captain
- (S) Suspended
- (I) Ineligible
- Injured
- Redshirt

Roster
Last update: November 20, 2024
