= 2024 Wisconsin–La Crosse Eagles football team =

American college football season

2024 Wisconsin–La Crosse Eagles football

NCAA Division III Second Round, L 13–24 at Saint John's (MN)
- Conference: Wisconsin Intercollegiate Athletic Conference

Ranking
- AFCA: No. 19
- D3Football.com: No. 18
- Record: 8–4 (5–2 WIAC)
- Head coach: Matt Janus (4th season)
- Offensive coordinator: Michael McGuire (5th season)
- Co-defensive coordinators: Mitchell Collicott (1st season); Michael Zweifel (1st season)
- Home stadium: Veterans Memorial Stadium

2024 Wisconsin Intercollegiate Athletic Conference football standings
	Conf.			Overall
Team	W		L	W		L
No. 7 Wisconsin–Platteville $^	6	–	1	9	–	2
No. 18 Wisconsin–La Crosse ^	5	–	2	8	–	4
Wisconsin–River Falls	4	–	3	7	–	3
Wisconsin–Oshkosh	4	–	3	6	–	4
Wisconsin–Whitewater	4	–	3	6	–	4
Wisconsin–Stout	4	–	3	6	–	5
Wisconsin–Eau Claire	1	–	6	2	–	8
Wisconsin–Stevens Point	0	–	7	1	–	9
$ – Conference champion; ^ – NCAA Division III playoff participant; Rankings from D3Football.com

The 2024 Wisconsin–La Crosse Eagles football team represented the University of Wisconsin–La Crosse as a member of the Wisconsin Intercollegiate Athletic Conference (WIAC) during the 2024 NCAA Division III football season. The Eagles, led by 4th-year head coach Matt Janus, played their home games at Veterans Memorial Stadium in La Crosse, Wisconsin.

Wisconsin–La Crosse finished the regular season 7–3 (5–2 in the WIAC) which was good enough for second in the conference. The team earned their fourth-consecutive NCAA Division III playoff berth.

== Schedule ==
Date	Time	Opponent	Rank	Site	TV	Result	Attendance	Source
September 5	5:00 p.m.	at RPI*	No. 6	East Campus Stadium; Troy, NY		W 35–0		
September 14	1:00 p.m.	Northern Michigan*	No. 6	Veterans Memorial Stadium; La Crosse, WI		W 35–21	3,110	
September 21	7:00 p.m.	at No. 2 (NCAA D-II) Grand Valley State*	No. 5	Lubbers Stadium; Allendale, MI	FloSports	L 13–20	15,884	
October 5	1:00 p.m.	No. 24 Wisconsin–Platteville^{†}	No. 3	Veterans Memorial Stadium; La Crosse, WI		L 27–30 ^{(OT)}	4,662	
October 12	1:00 p.m.	at No. 20 Wisconsin–Oshkosh	No. 12	Titan Stadium; Oshkosh, WI		L 33–34	1,713	
October 19	11:30 a.m.	at Wisconsin–Eau Claire	No. 22	Carson Park; Eau Claire, WI		W 34–7	4,132	
October 26	1:00 p.m.	No. 10 Wisconsin–River Falls	No. 22	Veterans Memorial Stadium; La Crosse, WI		W 28–24	2,564	
November 2	1:00 p.m.	at Wisconsin–Stout	No. 20	Don and Nona Williams Stadium; Menomonie, WI		W 33–31	752	
November 9	1:00 p.m.	Wisconsin–Whitewater	No. 20	Veterans Memorial Stadium; La Crosse, WI		W 24–21	3,037	
November 16	1:00 p.m.	Wisconsin–Stevens Point	No. 20	Veterans Memorial Stadium; La Crosse, WI		W 56–14	1,833	
November 23	12:00 p.m.	Northwestern (MN)*	No. 18	Veterans Memorial Stadium; La Crosse, WI (NCAA Division III First Round)	ESPN+	W 59–14		
November 30	12:00 p.m.	at No. 3 Saint John's (MN)*	No. 18	Clemens Stadium; Collegeville, MN (NCAA Division III Second Round)	ESPN+	L 13–24	3,117	
*Non-conference game; ^{†}Homecoming; Rankings from D3 Poll released prior to the game; All times are in Eastern time

== Rankings ==
Ranking movements Legend: ██ Increase in ranking ██ Decrease in ranking т = Tied with team above or below ( ) = First-place votes
	Week												
Poll	Pre	1	2	3	4	5	6	7	8	9	10	11	Final
D3	6	6	5	3	3	12	22	22	20	20	20	18	21
AFCA	6	5	5	5 (1)	5 (1)	18	24	25т	21	21	21	19	21
