= 2024 Wisconsin–Platteville Pioneers football team =

American college football season

2024 Wisconsin–Platteville Pioneers football

WIAC champion

NCAA Division III Second Round, L 14–19 at Wartburg
- Conference: Wisconsin Intercollegiate Athletic Conference

Ranking
- AFCA: No. 9
- D3Football.com: No. 7
- Record: 9–2 (6–1 WIAC)
- Head coach: Ryan Munz (3rd season)
- Offensive coordinator: Brent Allen (3rd season)
- Defensive coordinator: Dan Bauder (3rd season)
- Home stadium: Ralph E. Davis Pioneer Stadium

2024 Wisconsin Intercollegiate Athletic Conference football standings
	Conf.			Overall
Team	W		L	W		L
No. 7 Wisconsin–Platteville $^	6	–	1	9	–	2
No. 18 Wisconsin–La Crosse ^	5	–	2	8	–	4
Wisconsin–River Falls	4	–	3	7	–	3
Wisconsin–Oshkosh	4	–	3	6	–	4
Wisconsin–Whitewater	4	–	3	6	–	4
Wisconsin–Stout	4	–	3	6	–	5
Wisconsin–Eau Claire	1	–	6	2	–	8
Wisconsin–Stevens Point	0	–	7	1	–	9
$ – Conference champion; ^ – NCAA Division III playoff participant; Rankings from D3Football.com

The 2024 Wisconsin–Platteville Pioneers football team represents the University of Wisconsin–Platteville as a member of the Wisconsin Intercollegiate Athletic Conference (WIAC) during the 2024 NCAA Division III football season. The Pioneers, led by 3rd-year head coach Ryan Munz, play their home games at Ralph E. Davis Pioneer Stadium in Platteville, Wisconsin.

== Schedule ==
Date	Time	Opponent	Rank	Site	TV	Result	Attendance	Source
September 7	6:00 p.m.	Lakeland*		Ralph E. Davis Pioneer Stadium; Platteville, WI		W 65–0	3,617	
September 14	7:00 p.m.	Dubuque*		Ralph E. Davis Pioneer Stadium; Platteville, WI		W 38–7	3,296	
September 21	1:00 p.m.	Wabash*		Ralph E. Davis Pioneer Stadium; Platteville, WI		W 42–21	2,461	
October 5	1:00 p.m.	at No. 3 Wisconsin–La Crosse	No. 24	Veterans Memorial Stadium; La Crosse, WI		W 30–27 ^{(OT)}	4,662	
October 12	1:00 p.m.	No. 4 Wisconsin–River Falls^{†}	No. 11	Ralph E. Davis Pioneer Stadium; Platteville, WI		W 28–7	5,462	
October 19	1:30 p.m.	at No. 16 Wisconsin–Oshkosh	No. 6	Titan Stadium; Oshkosh, WI		L 17–24	2,366	
October 26	1:00 p.m.	No. 19 Wisconsin–Whitewater	No. 8	Ralph E. Davis Pioneer Stadium; Platteville, WI		W 17–10	3,011	
November 2	1:00 p.m.	at Wisconsin–Stevens Point	No. 8	Goerke Field; Stevens Point, WI		W 42–14	1,183	
November 9	1:00 p.m.	Wisconsin–Eau Claire	No. 8	Ralph E. Davis Pioneer Stadium; Platteville, WI		W 56–14	3,782	
November 16	1:30 p.m.	at Wisconsin–Stout	No. 8	Don and Nona Williams Stadium; Menomonie, WI		W 46–38	2,986	
November 30	11:00 a.m.	at No. 11 Wartburg*	No. 7	Walston-Hoover Stadium; Waverly, IA (NCAA Division III Second Round)	ESPN+	L 14–19	3,715	
*Non-conference game; ^{†}Homecoming; Rankings from D3 Poll released prior to the game; All times are in Eastern time

== Rankings ==
Ranking movements Legend: ██ Increase in ranking ██ Decrease in ranking RV = Received votes
	Week												
Poll	Pre	1	2	3	4	5	6	7	8	9	10	11	Final
D3	RV	RV	RV	RV	24	11	6	8	8	8	8	7	
AFCA	RV	RV	23	23	20	11	6	11	9	9	9	9	
