= 2024 NCAA Division III football rankings =

Rankings for the 2024 NCAA Division III football season

- Season: 2024
- Postseason: Single-elimination
- Preseason No. 1: North Central (IL)
- National champions: North Central (IL)
- Conference with most teams in final poll: PAC (3)

Two human polls and a committee's selections comprise the 2024 National Collegiate Athletic Association (NCAA) Division III football rankings. Unlike in Division I's Football Bowl Subdivision (FBS), the NCAA, Division III college football's governing body, bestows a national championship on the winner of the Stagg Bowl – the championship round of a 40-team postseason tournament. The main weekly polls that begin in the preseason are the D3football.com poll and the AFCA Coaches Poll, which rank the top 25 colleges in Division III football. The 2024 season was the first time that a preseason Coaches Poll was released for Division III.

== Legend ==
| | Increase in ranking |
| | Decrease in ranking |
| | Not ranked previous week |
| | Selected for Division III Football Championship Playoffs |
| (#–#) | Win–loss record |
| (Italics) | Number of first place votes |
| т | Tied with team above or below also with this symbol |

== D3football.com poll ==
| | Preseason July 24 | Week 1 September 8 | Week 2 September 15 | Week 3 September 22 | Week 4 September 29 | Week 5 October 6 | Week 6 October 13 | Week 7 October 20 | Week 8 October 27 | Week 9 November 3 | Week 10 November 10 | Week 11 November 17 | Final January 7, 2025 | |
|---|---|---|---|---|---|---|---|---|---|---|---|---|---|---|
| 1. | North Central (IL) (14) | North Central (IL) (0–0) (17) | North Central (IL) (1–0) (17) | North Central (IL) (2–0) (16) | North Central (IL) (3–0) (16) | North Central (IL) (4–0) (18) | North Central (IL) (5–0) (18) | North Central (IL) (6–0) (18) | North Central (IL) (7–0) (18) | North Central (IL) (8–0) (18) | North Central (IL) (9–0) (22) | North Central (IL) (10–0) (22) | North Central (IL) (15–0) (25) | 1. |
| 2. | Cortland (11) | Cortland (1–0) (8) | Cortland (2–0) (8) | Cortland (2–0) (9) | Cortland (3–0) (9) | Cortland (4–0) (7) | Cortland (5–0) (7) | Cortland (6–0) (7) | Cortland (7–0) (7) | Cortland (8–0) (7) | Cortland (9–0) (3) | Cortland (10–0) (3) | Mount Union (14–1) | 2. |
| 3. | Wisconsin–Whitewater | Wisconsin–Whitewater (1–0) | Wisconsin–Whitewater (2–0) | Wisconsin–La Crosse (2–1) | Wisconsin–La Crosse (2–1) | Saint John's (MN) (4–0) | Saint John's (MN) (5–0) | Saint John's (MN) (6–0) | Saint John's (MN) (7–0) | Saint John's (MN) (8–0) | Saint John's (MN) (9–0) | Saint John's (MN) (10–0) | Johns Hopkins (12–2) | 3. |
| 4. | Wartburg | Mount Union (1–0) | Mount Union (1–0) | Mount Union (2–0) | Mount Union (3–0) | Wisconsin–River Falls (4–0) | Mount Union (5–0) | Mount Union (6–0) | Mount Union (7–0) | Mount Union (8–0) | Hardin–Simmons (9–0) | Hardin–Simmons (10–0) | Susquehanna (12–2) | 4. |
| 5. | Mount Union | Wartburg (1–0) | Wisconsin–La Crosse (2–0) | Saint John's (MN) (2–0) | Saint John's (MN) (3–0) | Mount Union (4–0) | Hardin–Simmons (5–0) | Hardin–Simmons (6–0) | Hardin–Simmons (7–0) | Hardin–Simmons (8–0) | Mount Union (9–0) | Mount Union (10–0) | Springfield (12–1) | 5. |
| 6. | Wisconsin–La Crosse | Wisconsin–La Crosse (1–0) | Saint John's (MN) (2–0) | Wisconsin–River Falls (2–0) | Wisconsin–River Falls (3–0) | Hardin–Simmons (4–0) | Wisconsin–Platteville (5–0) | Salisbury (6–0) | Salisbury (7–0) | Susquehanna (8–1) | Susquehanna (8–1) | Susquehanna (9–1) | Salisbury (12–1) | 6. |
| 7. | Alma | Johns Hopkins (1–0) | Wisconsin–River Falls (1–0) | Hardin–Simmons (2–0) | Hardin–Simmons (3–0) | Grove City (4–0) | Grove City (5–0) | Susquehanna (6–1) | Susquehanna (7–1) | Salisbury (8–0) | Salisbury (9–0) | Wisconsin–Platteville (9–1) | Saint John's (MN) (11–1) | 7. |
| 8. | Johns Hopkins | Wisconsin–River Falls (1–0) | Johns Hopkins (2–0) | Grove City (2–0) | Grove City (3–0) | Susquehanna (4–1) | Susquehanna (5–1) | Wisconsin–Platteville (5–1) | Wisconsin–Platteville (6–1) | Wisconsin–Platteville (7–1) | Wisconsin–Platteville (8–1) | Salisbury (10–0) | Bethel (MN) (11–3) | 8. |
| 9. | Wheaton (IL) | Randolph–Macon (1–0) | Grove City (1–0) | Susquehanna (2–1) | Salisbury (3–0) | Salisbury (4–0) | Salisbury (5–0) | Wisconsin–Oshkosh (4–2) | Wisconsin–Oshkosh (5–2) | Wisconsin–Oshkosh (6–2) | DePauw (9–0) | DePauw (10–0) | Cortland (11–1) | 9. |
| 10. | Randolph–Macon | Grove City (1–0) | Randolph–Macon (2–0) | Wisconsin–Whitewater (2–1) | Susquehanna (3–1) | Wisconsin–Whitewater (3–1) | Wisconsin–River Falls (4–1) | Wisconsin–La Crosse (3–3) | DePauw (7–0) | DePauw (8–0) | Endicott (8–1) | Endicott (9–1) | DePauw (11–1) | 10. |
| 11. | Grove City | Susquehanna (1–0) | Susquehanna (2–0) | Salisbury (3–0) | Wisconsin–Whitewater (2–1) | Wisconsin–Platteville (4–0) | Endicott (4–1) | Endicott (5–1) | Endicott (6–1) | Endicott (7–1) | Wartburg (8–1) | Wartburg (9–1) | Hardin–Simmons (10–1) | 11. |
| 12. | Susquehanna | Saint John's (MN) (1–0) | Hardin–Simmons (2–0) | Endicott (3–0) | Endicott (4–0) | Wisconsin–La Crosse (2–2) | Wartburg (4–1) | DePauw (6–0) | Wartburg (6–1) | Wartburg (7–1) | Grove City (8–1) | Grove City (9–1) | Mary Hardin–Baylor (8–4) | 12. |
| 13. | Trinity (TX) | Hardin–Simmons (1–0) | Wartburg (1–1) | Wartburg (2–1) | Wartburg (3–1) | Mary Hardin–Baylor (2–1) | DePauw (5–0) | Wartburg (5–1) | Grove City (6–1) | Grove City (7–1) | Carnegie Mellon (8–1) | Carnegie Mellon (9–1) | Wartburg (10–2) | 13. |
| 14. | Saint John's (MN) | Aurora (1–0) | Wisconsin–Oshkosh (2–0) | Mary Hardin–Baylor (1–1) | Mary Hardin–Baylor (1–1) | Carnegie Mellon (5–0) | Whitworth (5–0) | Whitworth (6–0) | Whitworth (7–0) | Aurora (8–1) | Aurora (9–1) | Linfield (9–1) | Hope (11–1) | 14. |
| 15. | Aurora | Alma (0–1) | Endicott (2–0) | Carnegie Mellon (3–0) | Carnegie Mellon (4–0) | Endicott (4–1) | Carnegie Mellon (5–1) | Grove City (5–1) | Aurora (7–1) | Whitworth (8–0) | Hope (9–0) | Aurora (9–1) | Carnegie Mellon (10–2) | 15. |
| 16. | Hardin–Simmons | Endicott (1–0) | Alma (1–1) | Alma (2–1) | DePauw (4–0) | Wartburg (3–1) | Wisconsin–Oshkosh (3–2) | Aurora (6–1) | Hope (7–0) | Carnegie Mellon (7–1) | Whitworth (9–0) | Hope (10–0) | Wisconsin–Platteville (9–2) | 16. |
| 17. | Wisconsin–River Falls | Wisconsin–Oshkosh (1–0) | Carnegie Mellon (2–0) | Wisconsin–Oshkosh (2–1) | Wisconsin–Oshkosh (2–1) | DePauw (4–0) | Aurora (5–1) | Hope (6–0) | Carnegie Mellon (6-1) | Hope (8–0) | Linfield (8–1) | Washington and Jefferson (9–1) | Linfield (10–2) | 17. |
| 18. | Endicott | Muhlenberg (1–0) | Wheaton (IL) (0–1) | DePauw (3–0) | Wheaton (IL) (2–1) | Whitworth (4–0) | Hope (5–0) | Carnegie Mellon (5–1) | Linfield (6–1) | Linfield (7–1) | Washington and Jefferson (8–1) | Wisconsin–La Crosse (7–3) | Endicott (10–2) | 18. |
| 19. | John Carroll | Wheaton (IL) (0–1) | Aurora (1–1) | Wheaton (IL) (1–1) | Whitworth (3–0) | Aurora (4–1) | Wisconsin–Whitewater (3–2) | Wisconsin–Whitewater (4–2) | Washington and Jefferson (7–1) | Washington and Jefferson (8–1) | Wisconsin–Oshkosh (6–3) | Johns Hopkins (9–1) | Grove City (9–2) | 19. |
| 20. | Ithaca | Carnegie Mellon (1–0) | Whitworth (2–0) | Johns Hopkins (2–1) | Aurora (3–1) | Wisconsin–Oshkosh (2–2) | Linfield (4–1) | Linfield (5–1) | Wisconsin–La Crosse (4–3) | Wisconsin–La Crosse (5–3) | Wisconsin–La Crosse (6–3) | Wheaton (IL) (8–2) | Randolph–Macon (10–2) | 20. |
| 21. | Muhlenberg | Linfield (1–0) | DePauw (2–0) | Whitworth (3–0) | Johns Hopkins (2–1) | Hope (5–0) | Johns Hopkins (4–1) | Washington and Jefferson (6–1) | Wisconsin–River Falls (5–2) | Johns Hopkins (7–1) | Johns Hopkins (8–1) | Bethel (MN) (8–2) | Wisconsin–La Crosse (8–4) | 21. |
| 22. | Carnegie Mellon | Berry (1–0) | Salisbury (2–0) | Aurora (2–1) | Linfield (2–1) | Johns Hopkins (3–1) | Wisconsin–La Crosse (2–3) | Wisconsin–La Crosse (3–3) | Johns Hopkins (6–1) | Marietta (8–0) | Marietta (8–1) | Whitworth (9–1) | Aurora (9–2) | 22. |
| 23. | Linfield | Whitworth (1–0) | Linfield (1–1) | Randolph–Macon (2–1) | Hope (4–0) | Linfield (3–1) | Mary Hardin–Baylor (2–2) | Johns Hopkins (5–1) | Wheaton (IL) (5–2) | Wheaton (IL) (6–2) | Wheaton (IL) (7–2) | Springfield (10–0) | Washington and Jefferson (9–2) | 23. |
| 24. | Whitworth | Ithaca (0–1) | Bethel (MN) (1–0) | Bethel (MN) (2–0) | Wisconsin–Platteville (3–0) | Wheaton (IL) (2–2) | Wheaton (IL) (3–2) | Mary Hardin–Baylor (3–2) | Mary Hardin–Baylor (3–2) | Mary Hardin–Baylor (4–2) | Bethel (MN) (8–1) | John Carroll (8–2) | Wheaton (IL) (9–2) | 24. |
| 25. | Berry | John Carroll (0–1) | John Carroll (0–1) | Linfield (2–1) | Randolph–Macon (2–1) | John Carroll (2–2) | Berry (4–1) | Wheaton (IL) (4–2) | Marietta (7–0) | Bethel (MN) (7–1) | Brockport (7–2) | Coe (9–1) | Whitworth (10–2) | 25. |
| | Preseason July 24 | Week 1 September 8 | Week 2 September 15 | Week 3 September 22 | Week 4 September 29 | Week 5 October 6 | Week 6 October 13 | Week 7 October 20 | Week 8 October 27 | Week 9 November 3 | Week 10 November 10 | Week 11 November 17 | Final January 7, 2025 | |
| | | Dropped: No. 13 Trinity (TX) (0–1) | Dropped: No. 18 Muhlenberg (1–1); No. 22 Berry (1–1); No. 24 Ithaca (0–2) | Dropped: No. 25 John Carroll (0–2) | Dropped: No. 16 Alma (2–2); No. 24 Bethel (MN) (2–1) | Dropped: No. 25 Randolph–Macon (3–1) | Dropped: No. 25 John Carroll (3–2) | Dropped: No. 25 Berry (5–1) | Dropped: No. 19 Wisconsin–Whitewater (4–3) | Dropped: No. 21 Wisconsin–River Falls (5–3) | Dropped: No. 24 Mary Hardin–Baylor (4–3) | Dropped: No. 19 Wisconsin–Oshkosh (6–4); No. 22 Marietta (8–2); No. 25 Brockport (7–3) | Dropped: No. 24 John Carroll (9–3); No. 25 Coe (9–2) | |

== AFCA Coaches Poll ==
| | Preseason August 26 | Week 1 September 9 | Week 2 September 16 | Week 3 September 23 | Week 4 September 30 | Week 5 October 7 | Week 6 October 14 | Week 7 October 21 | Week 8 October 28 | Week 9 November 4 | Week 10 November 11 | Week 11 November 18 | Final January 6, 2025 | |
|---|---|---|---|---|---|---|---|---|---|---|---|---|---|---|
| 1. | North Central (IL) (26) | North Central (IL) (0–0) (28) | North Central (IL) (1–0) (33) | North Central (IL) (2–0) (33) | North Central (IL) (3–0) (36) | North Central (IL) (4–0) (36) | North Central (IL) (5–0) (36) | North Central (IL) (6–0) (36) | North Central (IL) (7–0) (37) | North Central (IL) (8–0) (36) | North Central (IL) (9–0) (38) | North Central (IL) (10–0) (38) | North Central (IL) (15–0) (43) | 1. |
| 2. | Cortland (24) | Cortland (1–0) (21) | Cortland (2–0) (16) | Cortland (3–0) (15) | Cortland (3–0) (12) | Cortland (4–0) (13) | Cortland (5–0) (13) | Cortland (6–0) (13) | Cortland (7–0) (12) | Cortland (8–0) (13) | Cortland (9–0) (11) | Cortland (10–0) (11) | Mount Union (14–1) | 2. |
| 3. | Wisconsin–Whitewater | Wisconsin–Whitewater (1–0) | Wisconsin–Whitewater (2–0) | Mount Union (2–0) (1) | Mount Union (3–0) (1) | Mount Union (4–0) (1) | Mount Union (5–0) (1) | Mount Union (6–0) (1) | Mount Union (7–0) (1) | Mount Union (8–0) (1) | Mount Union (9–0) (1) | Mount Union (10–0) (1) | Johns Hopkins (12–2) | 3. |
| 4. | Wartburg | Mount Union (1–0) (1) | Mount Union (1–0) (1) | Saint John's (MN) (2–0) | Saint John's (MN) (3–0) | Saint John's (MN) (4–0) | Saint John's (MN) (5–0) | Saint John's (MN) (6–0) | Saint John's (MN) (7–0) | St. John's (MN) (8–0) | St. John's (MN) (9–0) | Saint John's (MN) (10–0) | Susquehanna (12–2) | 4. |
| 5. | Mount Union | Wisconsin–La Crosse (1–0) | Wisconsin–La Crosse (2–0) | Wisconsin–La Crosse (2–1) (1) | Wisconsin–La Crosse (2–1) (1) | Wisconsin–River Falls (4–0) | Hardin–Simmons (5–0) | Hardin–Simmons (6–0) | Hardin–Simmons (7–0) | Hardin–Simmons (8–0) | Hardin–Simmons (9–0) | Hardin–Simmons (10–0) | Salisbury (12–1) | 5. |
| 6. | Wisconsin–La Crosse | Wartburg (1–0) | Johns Hopkins (2–0) | Wisconsin–River Falls (2–0) | Wisconsin–River Falls (3–0) | Hardin–Simmons (4–0) | Wisconsin–Platteville (5–0) | Susquehanna (6–1) | Susquehanna (7–1) | Susquehanna (8–1) | Susquehanna (8–1) | Susquehanna (9–1) | Springfield (12–1) | 6. |
| 7. | Alma | Johns Hopkins (1–0) | Saint John's (MN) (2–0) | Grove City (2–0) | Grove City (3–0) | Grove City (4–0) | Grove City (5–0) | Salisbury (6–0) | Salisbury (7–0) | Salisbury (8–0) | Salisbury (9–0) | Salisbury (10–0) | Saint John's (MN) (11–1) | 7. |
| 8. | Johns Hopkins | Randolph–Macon (1–0) | Wisconsin–River Falls (1–0) | Hardin–Simmons (2–0) | Hardin–Simmons (3–0) | Wisconsin–Whitewater (3–1) | Susquehanna (5–1) | DePauw (6–0) | DePauw (7–0) | DePauw (8–0) | DePauw (9–0) | DePauw (10–0) | Cortland (11–1) | 8. |
| 9. | Wheaton (IL) | Grove City (1–0) | Randolph–Macon (2–0) | Endicott (3–0) | Endicott (4–0) | Susquehanna (4–1) | Salisbury (5–0) | Wisconsin–River Falls (5–1) | Wisconsin–Platteville (6–1) | Wisconsin–Platteville (7–1) | Wisconsin–Platteville (8–1) | Wisconsin–Platteville (9–1) | DePauw (11–1) | 9. |
| 10. | Randolph–Macon | Wisconsin–River Falls (1–0) | Grove City (1–0) | Susquehanna (2–1) | Susquehanna (3–1) | Carnegie Mellon (5–0) | DePauw (5–0) | Whitworth (6–0) | Whitworth (7–0) | Whitworth (8–0) | Whitworth (9–0) | Wartburg (9–1) | Bethel (MN) (11–3) | 10. |
| 11. | Grove City | Susquehanna (1–0) | Susquehanna (2–0) | Carnegie Mellon (3–0) т | Wisconsin–Whitewater (2–1) | Wisconsin–Platteville (4–0) | Wisconsin–River Falls (4–1) | Wisconsin–Platteville (5–1) | Wartburg (6–1) | Wartburg (7–1) | Wartburg (8–1) | Endicott (9–1) | Mary Hardin–Baylor (8–4) | 11. |
| 12. | Susquehanna | Saint John's (MN) (1–0) | Hardin–Simmons (2–0) | Wisconsin–Whitewater (2–1) т | Carnegie Mellon (4–0) | Salisbury (4–0) | Whitworth (5–0) | Wartburg (5–1) | Endicott (6–1) | Endicott (7–1) | Endicott (8–1) | Linfield (9–1) | Wartburg (10–2) | 12. |
| 13. | Trinity (TX) | Aurora (1–0) | Wisconsin–Oshkosh (2–0) | Salisbury (3–0) | Salisbury (3–0) | DePauw (5–0) | Wartburg (4–1) | Endicott (5–1) | Wisconsin–Oshkosh (5–2) | Wisconsin–Oshkosh (6–2) | Aurora (9–1) | Aurora (9–1) | Hope (11–1) | 13. |
| 14. | Saint John's (MN) | Hardin–Simmons (1–0) | Endicott (2–0) | DePauw (3–0) | DePauw (4–0) | Whitworth (4–0) | Endicott (4–1) | Wisconsin–Oshkosh (4–2) | Aurora (7–1) | Aurora (8–1) | Linfield (8–1) | Hope (10–0) | Carnegie Mellon (10–2) | 14. |
| 15. | Aurora | Endicott (1–0) | Wartburg (1–1) | Alma (2–1) | Wartburg (3–1) | Wartburg (3–1) | Carnegie Mellon (5–1) | Aurora (6–1) | Linfield (6–1) | Linfield (7–1) | Hope (9–0) | Carnegie Mellon (9–1) | Hardin–Simmons (10–1) | 15. |
| 16. | Hardin–Simmons | Alma (0–1) т | Carnegie Mellon (2–0) | Wartburg (2–1) | Whitworth (3–0) | Endicott (4–1) | Aurora (5–1) | Carnegie Mellon (5–1) | Carnegie Mellon (6–1) | Hope (8–0) | Carnegie Mellon (8–1) | Grove City (9–1) | Linfield (10–2) | 16. |
| 17. | Wisconsin–River Falls | Linfield (1–0) т | Alma (1–1) | Whitworth (3–0) | Mary Hardin–Baylor (1–1) | Mary Hardin–Baylor (2–1) | Linfield (4–1) | Linfield (5–1) | Hope (7–0) | Carnegie Mellon (7–1) | Grove City (8–1) | Johns Hopkins (9–1) | Wisconsin–Platteville (9–2) | 17. |
| 18. | Endicott | Wisconsin–Oshkosh (1–0) | DePauw (2–0) | Mary Hardin–Baylor (1–1) | Wisconsin–Oshkosh (2–1) | Wisconsin–La Crosse (2–2) | Hope (5–0) | Hope (6–0) | Grove City (6–1) | Grove City (7–1) | Johns Hopkins (8–1) | Washington & Jefferson (9–1) | Randolph–Macon (10–2) | 18. |
| 19. | Ithaca | Muhlenberg (1–0) | Whitworth (2–0) | Wisconsin–Oshkosh (2–1) | Linfield (2–1) | Linfield (3–1) | Wisconsin–Oshkosh (3–2) | Grove City (5–1) | Johns Hopkins (6–1) | Johns Hopkins (7–1) | Washington & Jefferson (8–1) | Wisconsin–La Crosse (7–3) | Endicott (10–2) | 19. |
| 20. | John Carroll | Carnegie Mellon (1–0) | Aurora (1–1) | Johns Hopkins (2–1) | Wisconsin–Platteville (3–0) | Aurora (4–1) | Johns Hopkins (4–1) | John Hopkins(5–1) | Wisconsin–River Falls (5–2) | Springfield (8–0) | Springfield (9–0) | Springfield (10–0) | Grove City (9–2) | 20. |
| 21. | Muhlenberg | Berry (1–0) | Linfield (1–1) | Linfield (2–1) | Aurora (3–1) | Hope (5–0) | Coe (6–0) | Coe (7–0) | Wisconsin–La Crosse (4–3) | Wisconsin–La Crosse (5–3) | Wisconsin–La Crosse (6–3) | Whitworth (9–1) | Wisconsin–La Crosse (8–4) | 21. |
| 22. | Linfield | Wheaton (IL) (0–1) | Wheaton (IL) (0–1) | Aurora (2–1) | Johns Hopkins (2–1) | Johns Hopkins (3–1) | Wisconsin–Whitewater (3–2) | Wisconsin–Whitewater (4–2) | Springfield (7–0) | Washington & Jefferson (8–1) | Randolph–Macon (8–1) | Randolph–Macon (9–1) | Aurora (9–2) | 22. |
| 23. | Carnegie Mellon | Whitworth (1–0) | Wisconsin–Platteville (2–0) | Wisconsin–Platteville (3–0) | Wheaton (IL) (2–1) | Wisconsin–Oshkosh (2–2) | Randolph–Macon (4–1) | Springfield (6–0) | Washington and Jefferson (7–1) | Marietta (8–0) | Wisconsin–Oshkosh (6–3) | Lake Forest (10–0) | Whitworth (10–2) | 23. |
| 24. | Berry | Ithaca (0–1) | Bethel (MN) (1–0) | Wheaton (IL) (1–1) | Hope (4–0) | Coe (5–0) | Wisconsin–La Crosse (2–3) | Randolph–Macon (5–1) | Randolph–Macon (6–1) | Randolph–Macon (7–1) | Marietta (8–1) | Coe (9–1) | Washington & Jefferson (9–2) | 24. |
| 25. | Whitworth | DePauw (1–0) | Salisbury (2–0) | Randolph–Macon (2–1) | Randolph–Macon (2–1) | Randolph–Macon (3–1) | Springfield (5–0) | Washington and Jefferson (6–1) т Wisconsin–La Crosse (3–3) т | Marietta (7–0) | Mary Hardin–Baylor (4–2) | Lake Forest (9–0) | Wisconsin–River Falls (7–3) | Coe (9–2) | 25. |
| | Preseason August 26 | Week 1 September 9 | Week 2 September 16 | Week 3 September 23 | Week 4 September 30 | Week 5 October 7 | Week 6 October 14 | Week 7 October 21 | Week 8 October 28 | Week 9 November 4 | Week 10 November 11 | Week 11 November 18 | Final January 6, 2025 | |
| | | Dropped: No. 13 Trinity (TX) (0–1); No. 20 John Carroll (0–1) | Dropped: No. 19 Muhlenberg (1–1); No. 21 Berry (1–1); No. 24 Ithaca (0–2) | Dropped: No. 24 Bethel (MN) (2–0) | Dropped: No. 15 Alma (2–2) | Dropped: No. 23 Wheaton (IL) (2–2) | Dropped: No. 17 Mary Hardin–Baylor (2–2) | None | Dropped: No. 21 Coe (7–1); No. 22 Wisconsin–Whitewater (4–3) | Dropped: No. 20 Wisconsin–River Falls (5–3) | Dropped: No. 25 Mary Hardin–Baylor (4–3) | Dropped: No. 23 Wisconsin Oshkosh (6–4); No. 24 Marietta (8–2) | Dropped: No. 23 Lake Forest (10–1); No. 25 Wisconsin–River Falls (7–3) | |
