= 2024 Aurora Spartans football team =

American college football season

2024 Aurora Spartans football

NACC champion

NCAA Division III Second Round, L 21–49 vs. Hope
- Conference: Northern Athletics Collegiate Conference

Ranking
- AFCA: No. 13
- D3Football.com: No. 15
- Record: 9–2 (8–0 NACC)
- Head coach: Don Beebe (6th season)
- Co-offensive coordinators: Don Beebe (6th season); Ryan Gehlert (4th season)
- Defensive coordinator: J. T. Zimmerman (3rd season)

2024 Northern Athletics Collegiate Conference football standings
	Conf.			Overall
Team	W		L	W		L
No. 15 Aurora $^	8	–	0	9	–	2
St. Norbert	7	–	1	8	–	3
Wisconsin Lutheran	6	–	2	7	–	3
Concordia (WI)	5	–	3	6	–	3
Lakeland	4	–	4	4	–	5
Benedictine (IL)	3	–	5	5	–	5
Rockford	2	–	6	4	–	6
Concordia (IL)	1	–	7	2	–	8
Eureka	0	–	8	0	–	10
$ – Conference champion; ^ – NCAA Division III playoff participant; Rankings from D3Football.com

The 2024 Aurora Spartans football team represent Aurora University as a member of the Northern Athletics Collegiate Conference (NACC) during the 2024 NCAA Division III football season. The Spartans, led by sixth-year head coach Don Beebe, played their home games at Spartan Athletic Park in Montgomery, Illinois.

== Schedule ==
Date	Time	Opponent	Rank	Site	TV	Result	Attendance	Source
September 6	6:00 p.m.	Dubuque*	No. 15	Chalmers Field; Dubuque, IA		W 33–21	1,535	
September 14	6:00 p.m.	No. 1 North Central (IL)*	No. 14	Spartan Athletic Park; Montgomery, IL		L 21–48	3,743	
September 21	1:00 p.m.	St. Norbert	No. 19	Spartan Athletic Park; Montgomery, IL		W 49–0	1,953	
September 28	1:00 p.m.	Concordia (IL)	No. 22	Spartan Athletic Park; Montgomery, IL		W 72–6	2,024	
October 5	1:00 p.m.	at Wisconsin Lutheran	No. 20	Raabe Stadium; Wauwatosa, WI		W 45–14	436	
October 12	1:00 p.m.	at Concordia (WI)	No. 19	Tomasini Stadium; Mequon, WI		W 42–14	501	
October 19	1:00 p.m.	Rockford	No. 17	Spartan Athletic Park; Montgomery, IL		W 69–0	1,153	
October 26	1:00 p.m.	at Lakeland	No. 16	Taylor Field; Plymouth, WI		W 49–14	495	
November 2	1:00 p.m.	Benedictine (IL)	No. 15	Spartan Athletic Park; Montgomery, IL		W 56–20	2,134	
November 9	6:00 p.m.	at Eureka	No. 14	Pete FioRito Stadium; Eureka, IL		W 56–0	100	
November 30	12:00 p.m.	at No. 16 Hope*	No. 15	Ray & Sue Smith Stadium; Holland, MI (NCAA Division III Second Round)	ESPN+	L 21–49	1,811	
*Non-conference game; Rankings from D3 Poll released prior to the game; All times are in Central time

== Rankings ==
Ranking movements Legend: ██ Increase in ranking ██ Decrease in ranking
	Week												
Poll	Pre	1	2	3	4	5	6	7	8	9	10	11	Final
D3	15	14	19	22	20	19	17	16	15	14	14	15	
AFCA	15	13	20	22	21	20	16	15	14	14	13	13	
