= Shell Energy Stadium =

Soccer stadium in Houston

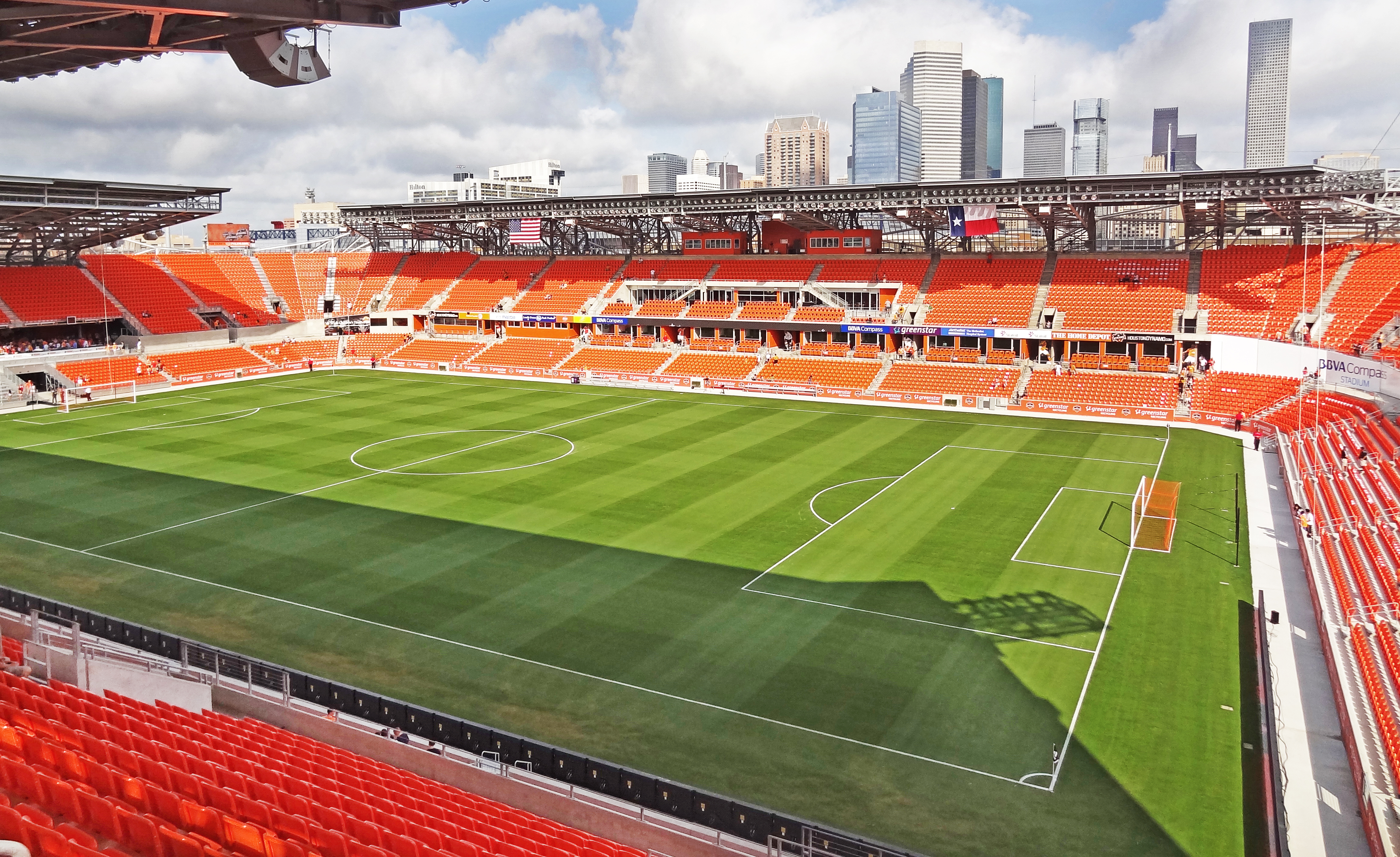
- Inside the stadium, 2012

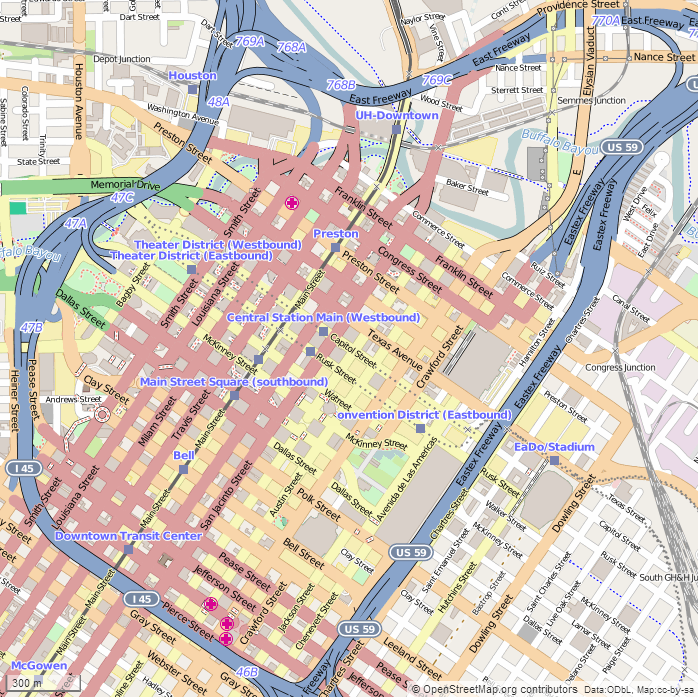
- Location in Houston Location in Texas Location in the United States
- Former names: BBVA Compass Stadium (2012–2019); BBVA Stadium (2019–2021); PNC Stadium (2021–2022)
- Address: 2200 Texas Avenue
- Location: Houston, Texas, U.S.
- Coordinates: 29°45.132′N 95°21.144′W
- Owner: Harris County–Houston Sports Authority
- Operator: Houston Dynamo Football Club (HDFC)
- Capacity: 22,039
- Surface: Paspalum grass
- Field size: 118 yd × 75 yd (108 m × 69 m)
- Public transit: EaDo/Stadium

Construction
- Groundbreaking: February 5, 2011
- Opened: May 12, 2012
- Cost: $95 million ($133 million in 2025 dollars)
- Architect: Populous
- Project manager: Harris County – Houston Sports Authority/ICON Venue
- Structural engineer: Walter P. Moore
- Services engineers: M–E Engineers, Inc.
- General contractor: Manhattan Construction Company

Tenants
- Houston Dynamo FC (MLS) (2012–present); Texas Southern Tigers (NCAA) (2012–2025); Houston Cougars (NCAA) (2013); Houston Baptist Huskies (NCAA) (2013); Houston Dash (NWSL) (2014–present); Sam Houston Bearkats (NCAA) (2025); Houston Gamblers (UFL) (2026)

Shell Energy Stadium (Note: The stadium was formerly called BBVA Compass Stadium, BBVA Stadium, then PNC Stadium) is a multi-purpose stadium located in Houston, Texas, United States. It is home to Houston Dynamo FC of the Major League Soccer and the Houston Dash of the National Women's Soccer League.

Opened in May 2012, it is the first soccer-specific stadium built in a major American metropolitan downtown city. The stadium is the result of combined commitments of $35.5 million from the city of Houston and $60 million from the Houston Dynamo Football Club. Harris County agreed to pay for half of the land in exchange for the ability to jointly own the stadium after its completion date.

The naming rights to the stadium were formerly held by BBVA USA; the name was changed to that of PNC Financial Services due to BBVA's acquisition by PNC. The stadium's naming rights have been owned by Shell Energy, whose American headquarters are based in Houston, since January 17, 2023.

The stadium is located on a tract of land bordered by Texas, Walker, Emancipation, and Hutchins in East Downtown and east of Interstate 69/U.S. Route 59 and Downtown Houston.

In North American competitions, the stadium is known as Houston Stadium due to advertising rules.

== Construction history: 2009–2011 ==
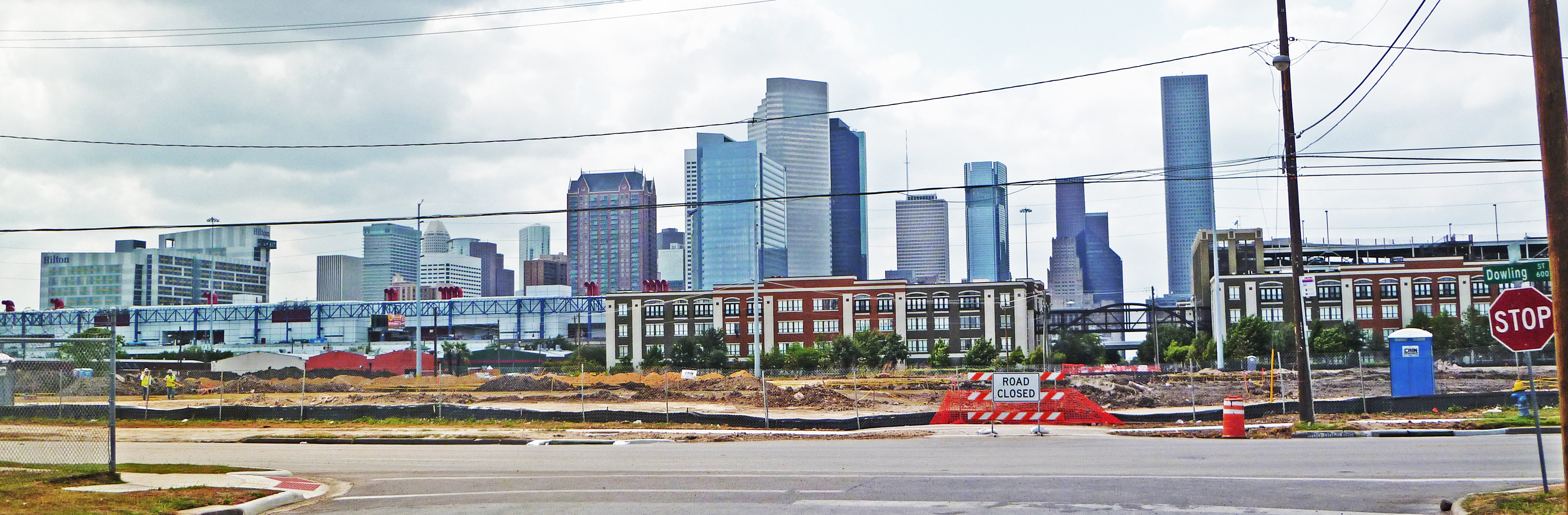
Construction site for the stadium

In June 2009, negotiations and financing began to fall into place with construction of the stadium originally beginning as early as Fall 2009. Banks and investors were in the books to finance the project and only minor details were being worked out. Various locations the Dynamo were interested in building a stadium since their arrival were the former Astroworld site, Pearland, Sugar Land and Northeast Houston near the Lake Houston area.

On January 26, 2010, the Houston Dynamo franchise had expressed an interest in a proposed 30-acre (120,000 m^{2}) parcel for the stadium location at South Rice Avenue and Westpark Drive—adjacent to Bellaire's city limits, and near the southwest corner of the Interstate 69/U.S. Highway 59 and the Interstate 610 interchanges. Two days later, the Mayor of Bellaire, Cindy Seigel said that she would use whatever power she could to oppose the possible new location and is in communication with the developer to dissuade him. She acknowledges that considering that the land is in Houston's city limits and only abuts her city, the odds are slim and said in an open letter to Midway:

Fans on the north and east side of Houston will have difficulty in getting to this site. Additionally, this site does not have the infrastructure in place to serve it that already exists at other athletic facilities downtown or at Reliant Park.

The highly populated and heavily Hispanic area of Gulfton is within proximity, although former Council member Pam Holm stated that ethnic considerations should not be key to choosing a stadium location: "To position this as a Hispanic sport and say the stadium has to be in proximity to Hispanic neighborhoods doesn't do it justice, the Dynamo is something that all citizens of Houston have so embraced."

On April 13, 2010, Harris County commissioners voted unanimously to begin construction of the new Dynamo stadium east of downtown, clearing the way for construction sometime in February 2011.

Oliver Luck, president and general manager of the Dynamo at the time, announced the financing, architect, and project manager for the new stadium. He announced Populous had been chosen to design and build the stadium. Populous, one of the world's leading sports architecture firms, had previously built three other major venues in the city—Daikin Park, Reliant Stadium, and the Toyota Center, and internationally designed soccer stadia including Wembley Stadium (London), Emirates Stadium (London), Soccer City (Johannesburg), and Aviva Stadium (Dublin).

On February 5, 2011, the Houston Dynamo, led by Houston mayor Annise Parker and Harris County judge Ed Emmett, broke ground on the Houston Dynamo Stadium site. Houston Dynamo President Chris Canetti strongly expressed that the stadium would be ready by April 2012.

== Renovations ==
=== 2023 ===
The stadium had several notable renovations in 2023. The stadium's 21,000+ orange plastic seats were replaced with more comfortable mesh seats that are about 30 degrees cooler than the plastic ones during very hot days. Seats in the upper deck are now black and orange, spelling out "Houston," while the lower deck features black, orange and Space City blue seats, a nod to the Dash. All LED lighting was added and an indoor club for premium seats was expanded. Shell Energy also installed special monitoring equipment to give stadium officials a live look at emissions. The goal is to cut stadium greenhouse gas emissions in half by 2026.

== Milestones ==
Date	Notes
February 5, 2011	Groundbreaking
March 10, 2011	The portion of Bastrop Street and Rusk Street that runs through the site is removed
May 6, 2011	Construction crews begin drilling on site
May 12, 2011	The first concrete is poured
August 15, 2011	First steel beam is installed
November 14, 2011	Last steel beam is installed
December 13, 2011	BBVA Compass acquires naming rights
May 10, 2012	Houston Dynamo Academy 0–3 United States U-17 Men's; First event & first soccer match
May 12, 2012	Houston Dynamo 1–0 D.C. United; First Houston Dynamo match
May 23, 2012	New Zealand 2–2 El Salvador (Association football); BBVA Compass Content Series; First international sporting event
June 23, 2012	USA 10–30 Italy (Rugby union); 2012 Italian Tour of the Americas; First rugby union match
August 31, 2012	Cinco Ranch (Katy) 34–6 Cypress Ranch (Cypress-Fairbanks) (American football); BBVA Compass Kick Off Classic; First American football game
September 15, 2012	Texas Southern 35–45 Jackson State (American football); First Texas Southern football game
October 12, 2012	Mexico 5–0 Guyana; 2014 FIFA World Cup qualification – CONCACAF third round First FIFA World Cup qualification match
November 4, 2012	Houston Dynamo 2–0 Sporting Kansas City; First Houston Dynamo playoff match
December 12, 2012	United States 4–0 China PR; International friendly First visit by the United States women's national soccer team (Note: The USWNT last played in the stadium on June 13, 2021 in a 4–0 win over Jamaica's women's national football team.)
January 29, 2013	United States 0–0 Canada; International friendly First visit by the United States men's national soccer team (Note: The USMNT last played in Houston during the Semifinals of the 2011 CONCACAF Gold Cup on June 22, 2011 at Reliant Stadium in a 1–0 win over Panama.)
February 1, 2013	Australia 31–12 Japan (Rugby sevens); 2012–13 IRB Women's Sevens World Series – Pool C First rugby sevens match United States 12–12 Canada (Rugby sevens); 2012–13 IRB Women's Sevens World Series – Pool B First visit by the United States rugby sevens team
April 14, 2013	Houston Dynamo 2–1 Chicago Fire; New record of longest unbeaten run at home in Major League Soccer (36 games)
October 12, 2013	Houston Cougars 25–15 Memphis Tigers (American football); First Houston Cougars game
April 12, 2014	Houston Dash 0–1 Portland Thorns FC; First Houston Dash match
August 3, 2014	Houston Gaels (White) 20–16 Houston Gaels (Blue) (Gaelic football); First Gaelic football match
October 16, 2022	Houston Dash 1–2 Kansas City Current; First Houston Dash playoff match
November 5, 2022	Texas Southern 14–41 Jackson State (American football); First Texas Southern football sell-out at stadium
April 5, 2026	Houston Gamblers 22–20 Birmingham Stallions; First Houston Gamblers game

== Sports ==
=== Soccer ===
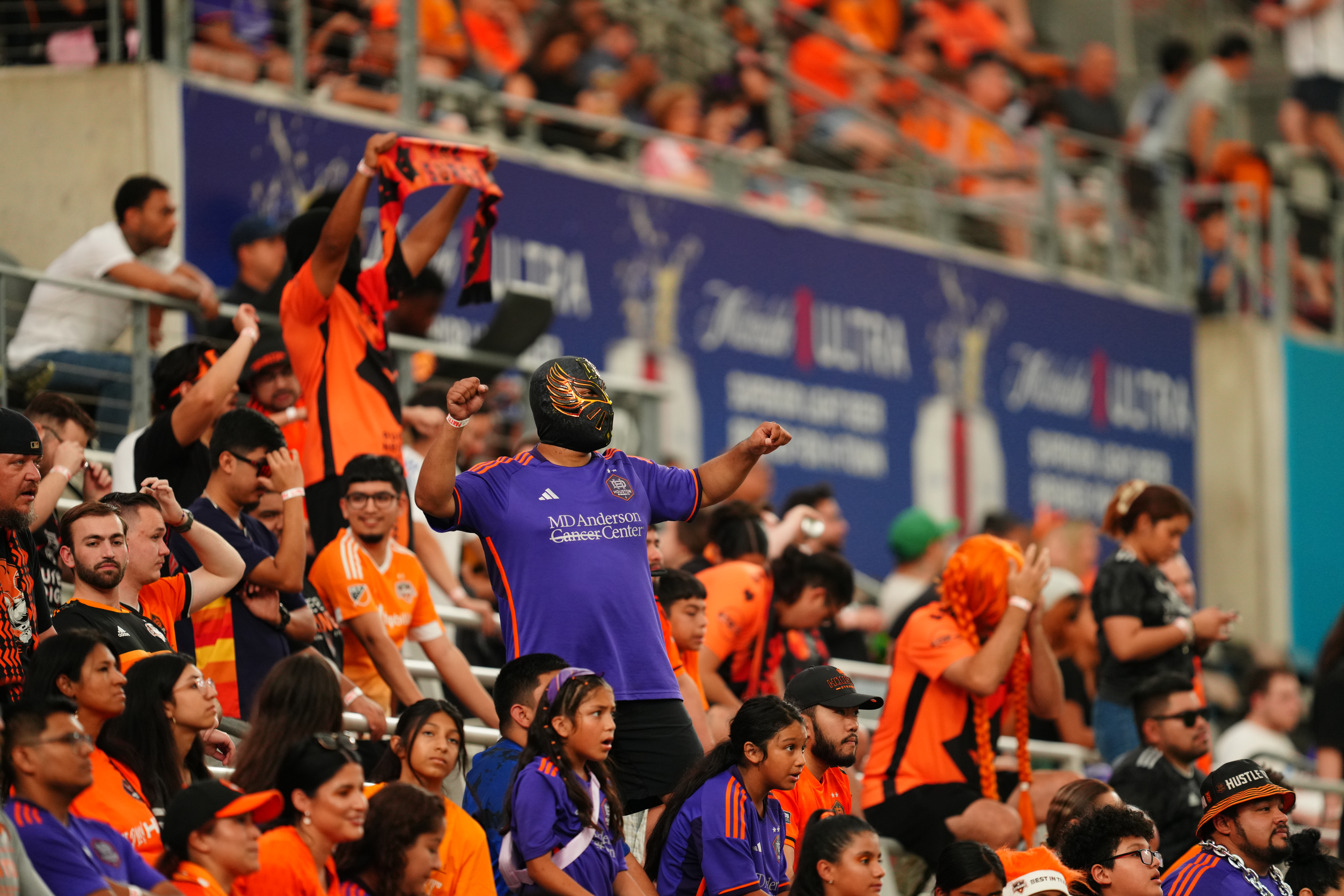
Houston Dynamo FC fans at Shell Energy Stadium in 2024

Construction on BBVA Stadium (now Shell Energy Stadium) led to the Houston Dynamo's decision to play their first seven games of the 2012 Major League Soccer season on the road. Their first match at the stadium was played on May 12, 2012 when they defeated D.C. United 1–0. The lone goal came from Brad Davis from 35 yards out which beat D.C. goalkeeper Bill Hamid. The win happened in front of a capacity crowd of 22,039 and would mark the beginning of what would be an unbeaten year for the Dynamo at home, posting a year-end home record of 11–0–6.

After completion, Shell Energy Stadium became home to several international matches. The first was between New Zealand and El Salvador for the BBVA Compass Content Series on May 23, 2012. The match ended in a 2–2 draw. The first FIFA Qualifier match was played between Mexico and Guyana on October 12, 2012. Mexico won the match, 5–0.

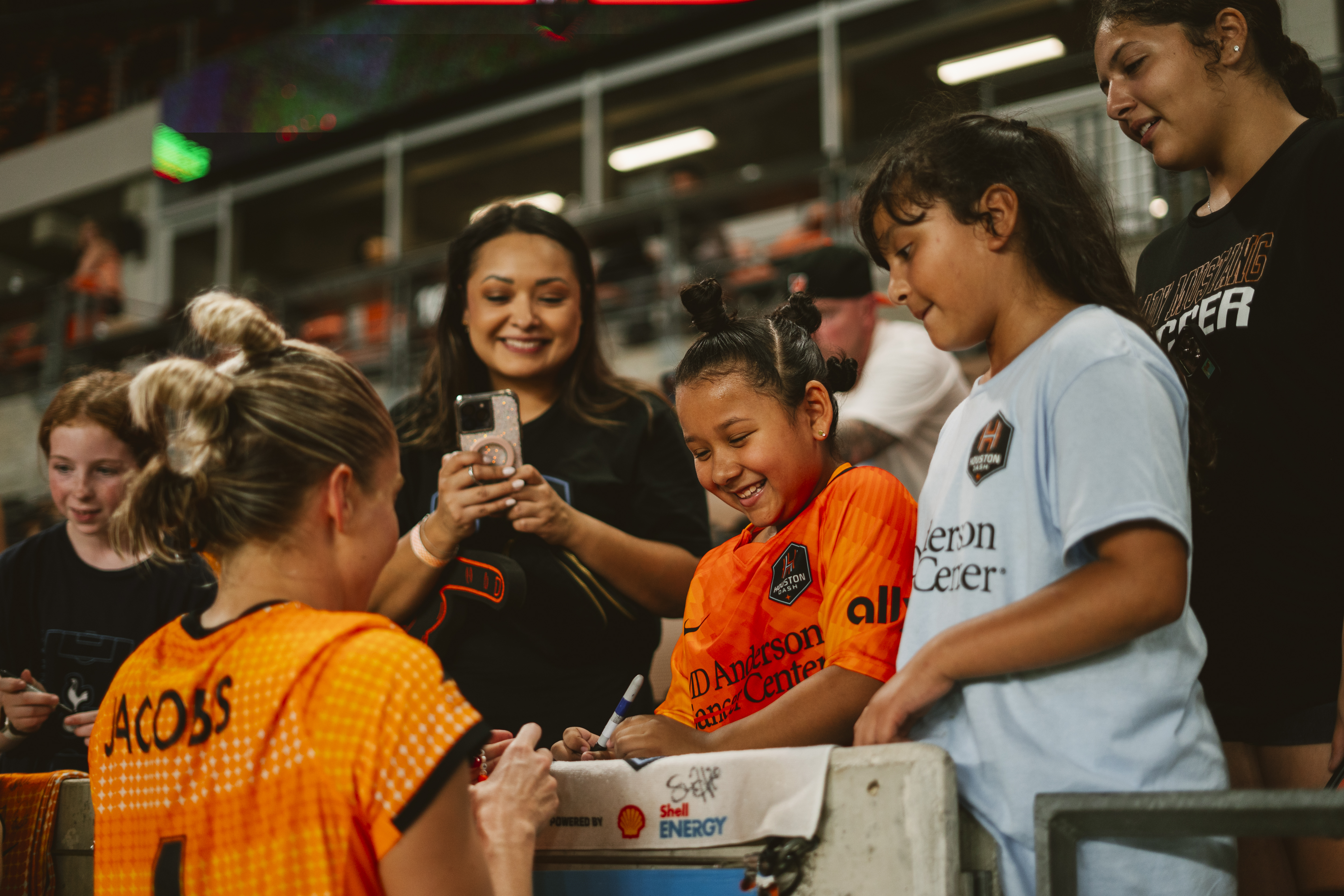
Houston Dash fans at Shell Energy Stadium in 2024

The United States women's national team made its debut at the stadium with a 4–0 win over China PR on December 12, 2012. The United States men's national team played to a scoreless draw with Canada on January 29, 2013, in its BBVA debut.

The Houston Dash, who are members of the National Women's Soccer League, began play at Shell Energy Stadium on April 12, 2014, after becoming the first expansion team in league history. In 2022, Shell Energy Stadium hosted its first ever NWSL playoff match between Houston Dash and Kansas City Current.

=== Rugby union ===
BBVA Stadium (now Shell Energy Stadium) played host to the 2012 Italian Tour of the Americas which saw the USA Eagles play Italy to a 30–10 loss. The Eagles returned to BBVA Compass Stadium to play a mid-year rugby union test match against Ireland on June 8, 2013; the Eagles lost 15–12, but set a record for largest crowd for the Eagles on home soil when 20,181 fans packed the stadium.

BBVA Stadium played host to the 2012–13 IRB Women's Sevens World Series in the USA leg of the series. However, the USA leg of the World Series was moved to the Atlanta suburb of Kennesaw, Georgia for the 2013–14 series, where it has remained ever since.

=== College football ===
Shell Energy Stadium is home to Texas Southern University football. During the 2013 season, the stadium also hosted the Houston Cougars for two games while TDECU Stadium was being built. In January 2024 Shell Energy Stadium hosted the College Football Playoff Concert Series as part of the city-wide celebration of the CFP National Championship game being held in the Space City. The NCAA Division III National Championship Game (Stagg Bowl) was held at Shell Energy Stadium on January 5, 2025.

Sam Houston State University played its 2025 home games at Shell Energy Stadium while its on-campus home of Bowers Stadium was closed for the construction of a new press box.

=== Gaelic football ===
BBVA Stadium (now Shell Energy Stadium) played host to the first ever Gaelic football game on an MLS pitch August 3, 2014, when the Houston Gaels played the first of their now-annual demonstration match (divided squad) after the Houston Dynamo-D.C. United match. The Gaels were originally scheduled to play on March 15 after the Dynamo-Montreal Impact match as part of the Saint Patrick's Day weekend festivities, but the game was postponed due to concerns about the rain-soaked pitch.

== Features and design ==
The stadium has a capacity of 20,656 seats, including 34 private suites, 1,100 club seats, Premium Club, dedicated supporters stand, and food court. The stadium is designed to accommodate MLS and FIFA standard international soccer, football, lacrosse, rugby, and concerts.

Architecturally, the stadium features a faceted facade of expanded metal mesh with orange polycarbonate enclosed entrances and spectator facilities that reflects the industrial heritage of the East Downtown location. The stadium architect, Christopher Lee of Populous, stated, “We set out to design the perfect urban soccer stadium: tight, atmospheric, and intimate.” Lee was the designer of the famed Emirates Stadium in London, England, and his design brings European stadium traditions of intimate and atmospheric soccer specific stadia to MLS. The $95 million stadium construction cost made the BBVA Compass Stadium the most cost-effective of modern soccer-specific stadiums, with recent venues like the Red Bull Arena costing $200 million, Rio Tinto Stadium costing $110 million, and PPL Park costing $115 million.

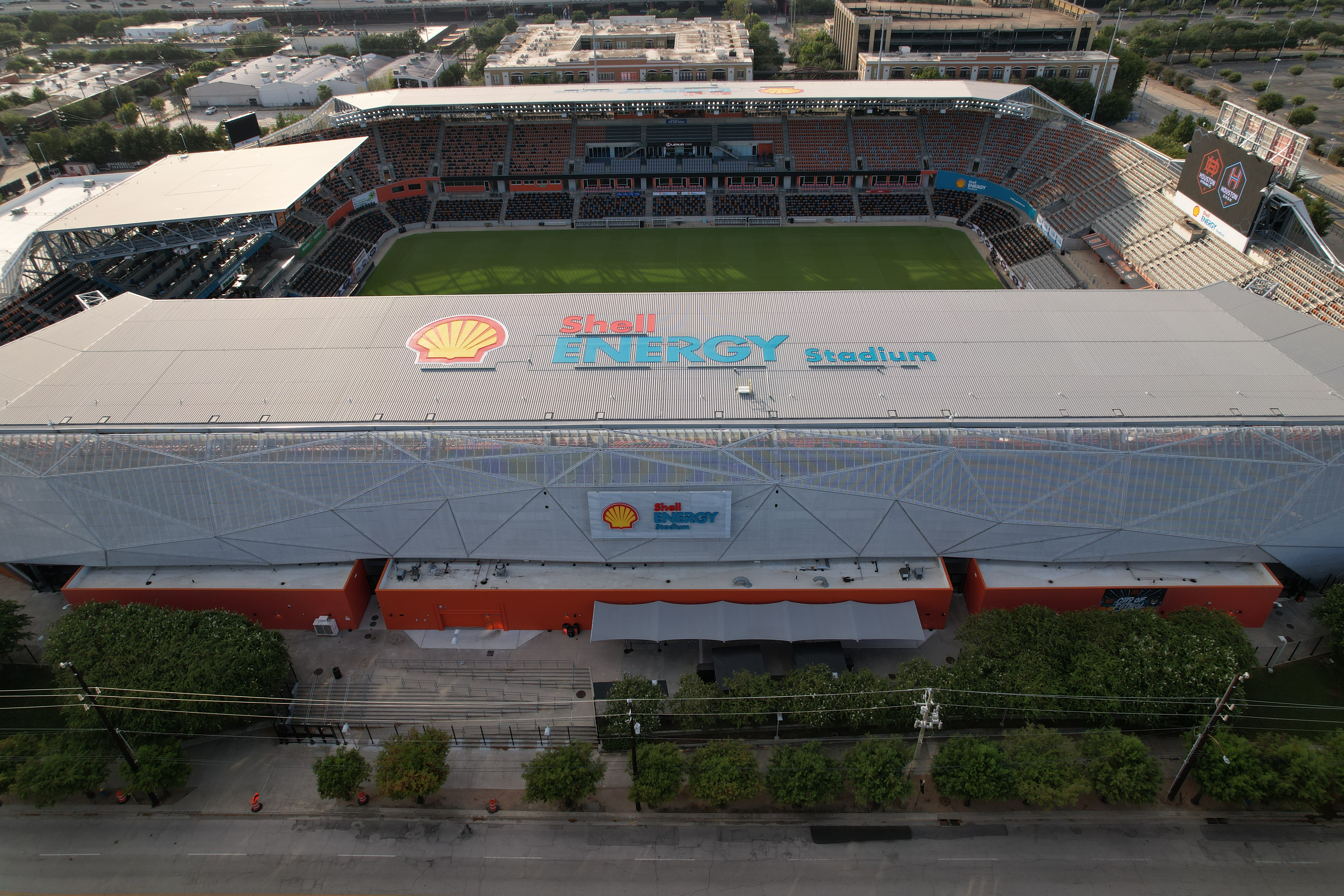
East Facade along Emancipation

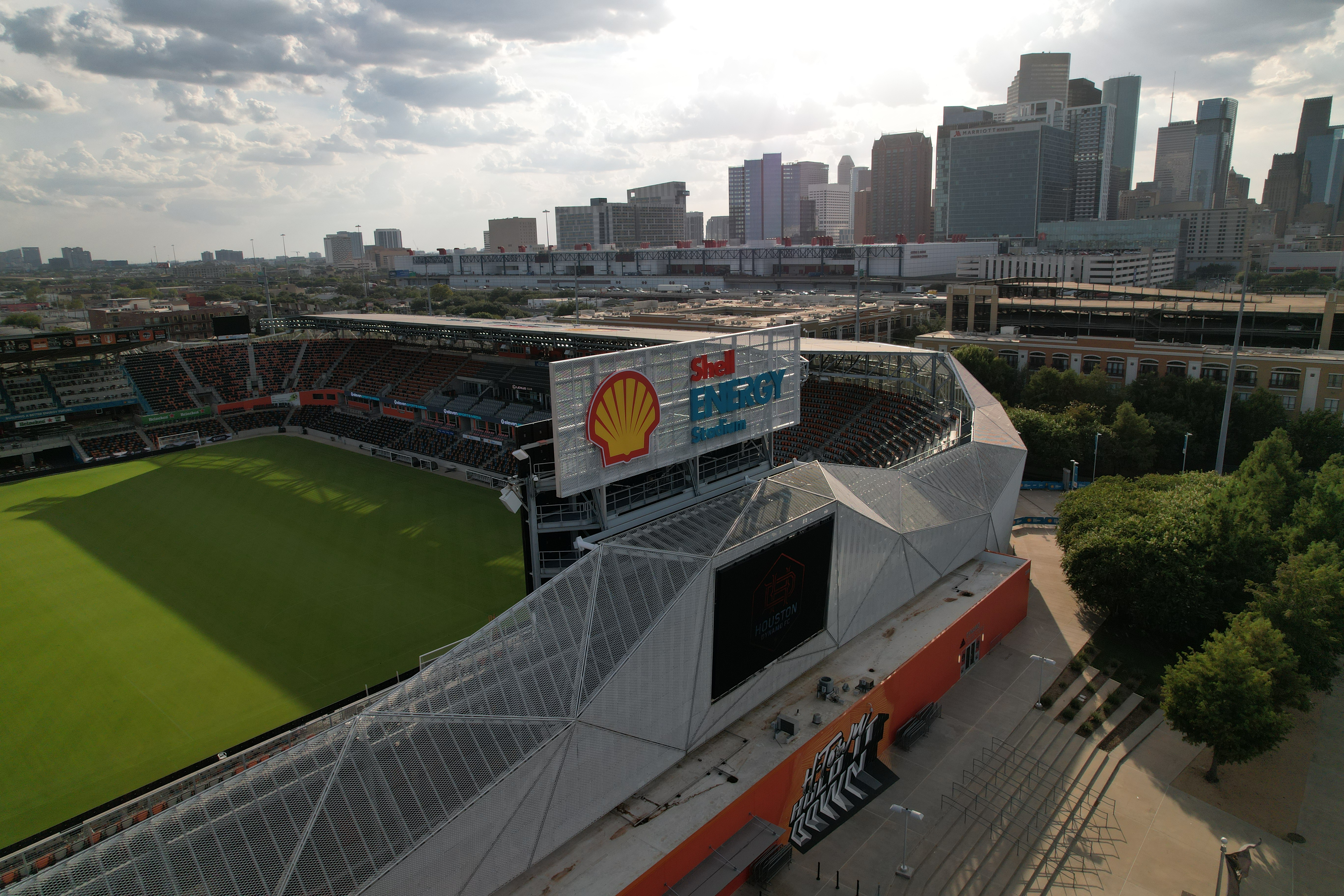
North Facade along Texas Avenue

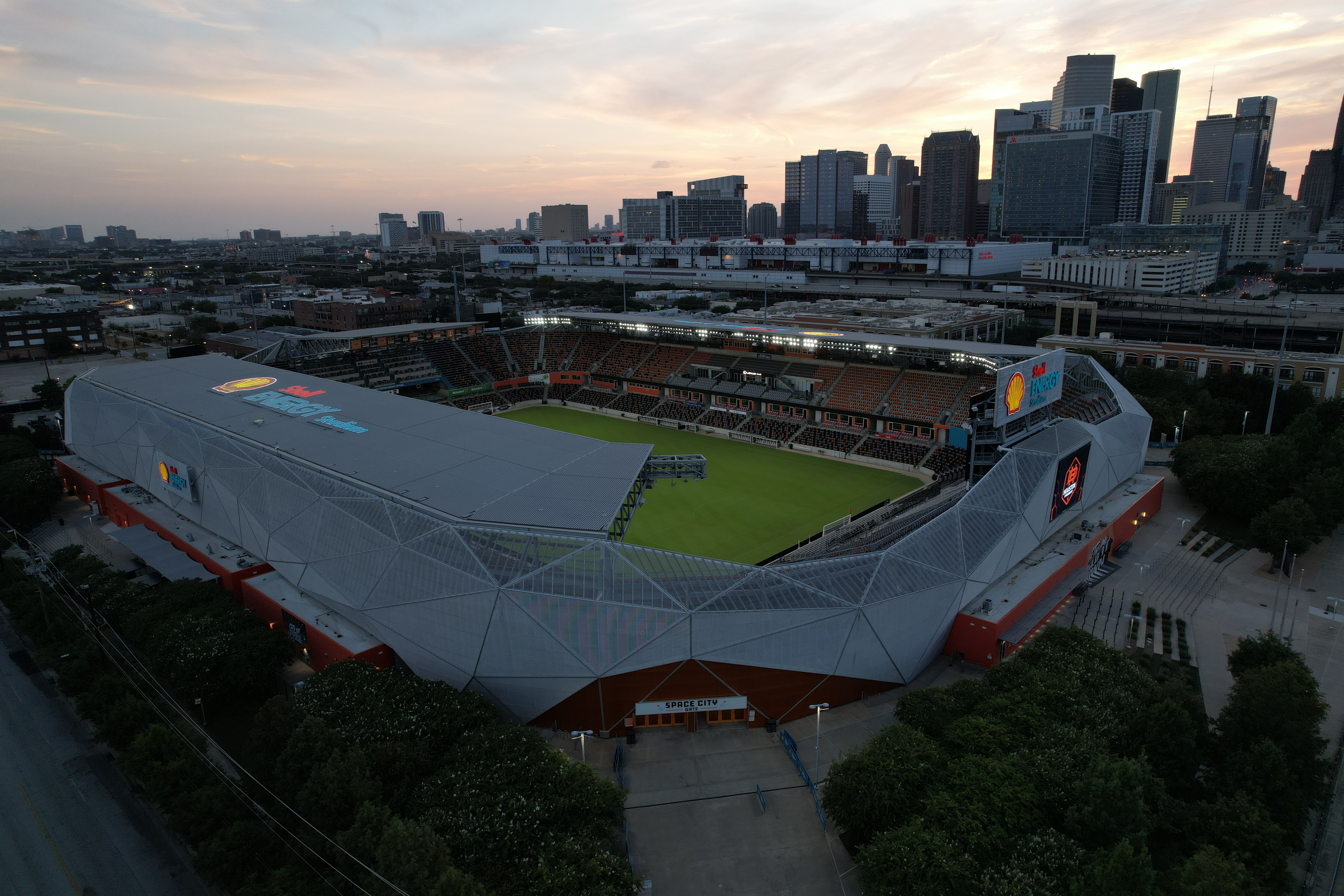
Shell Energy Stadium Geometric Entrance

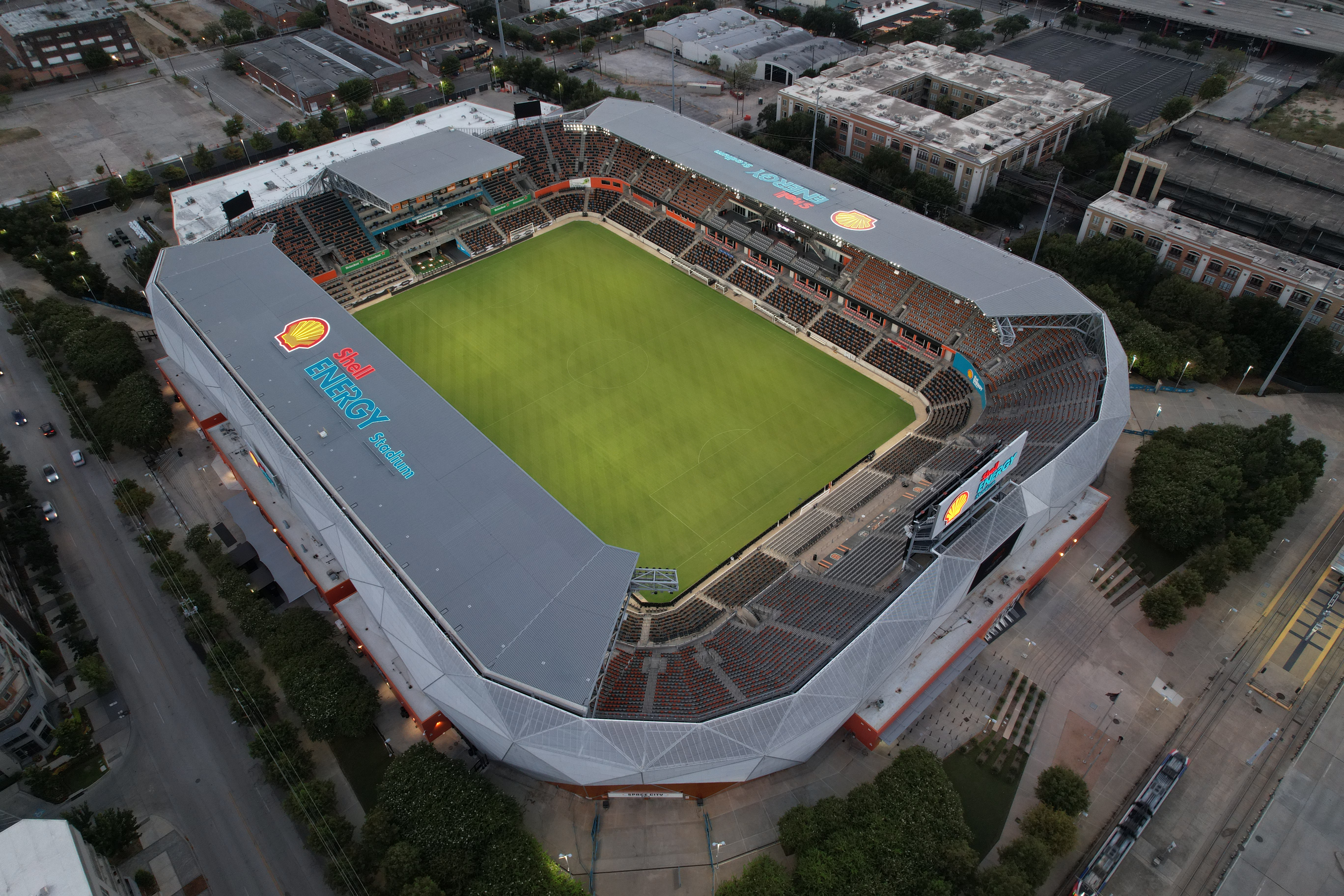
Stadium Illuminated at Night

== Sponsors ==
On December 13, 2011, BBVA Compass, an international bank with dozens of branches in Houston, signed a 10-year, $20 million naming rights deal. The stadium was renamed to "BBVA Stadium" on June 13, 2019, as part of the company's brand changes.

During the second half of the 2021 season, BBVA Stadium was rebranded as PNC Stadium following PNC Financial Services' acquisition of BBVA USA in June 2021.

Shell Energy announced on January 17, 2023 that it acquired the stadium's naming rights, agreeing to an 8 year, $40 million deal.

== Awards ==
On December 10, 2012, BBVA Compass Stadium (now Shell Energy Stadium) received the Leadership in Energy and Environmental Design Silver certification from the U.S. Green Building Council.

The stadium received the award for its innovative construction and sustainable design. Notable achievements during the stadium's construction process included diverting 86.85% of on-site generated construction waste to landfills, reducing water use by 41% from the installation of high-energy toilets, reducing energy use by 20.41%, using 98.42% of the wood-based building materials from certified forests and providing preferred parking spaces for fuel-efficient low-emissions vehicles.

== Concessions ==
On March 22, 2012, Houston Dynamo Football Club (HDFC) announced Levy Restaurants will be the official restaurant partner. On February 13, 2023, HDFC announced a multi-year agreement with James Beard Award-winning chef Hugo Ortega, who would collaborate with Levy, hospitality partner of the Club to elevate the food and beverage experience at Shell Energy Stadium and feature local restaurants, purveyors, and eclectic flavors from Houston’s culinary community. On March 8, 2023, HDFC announced its expanded lineup of local offerings with 10 new restaurant partners.

== Stadium partners ==
The following are its current official stadium partners:

- Shell Energy
- MD Anderson
- Coca-Cola/Dasani
- SeatGeek
- Heriberto Ramos
- King Ranch, formerly Brookside Equipment
- Bacardi/Cazadores
- Constellation Brands/Corona Premier

== Transportation and accessibility ==
The stadium is adjacent to METRORail light rail at EaDo/Stadium station, served by the Green and Purple lines. Taxi, Buses, street, and garage parking nearby. The stadium is located southeast of Daikin Park—within the East Downtown district (which is undergoing revitalization efforts) and east of Downtown Houston.

== International matches ==
BBVA Stadium (now Shell Energy Stadium) hosted its first international match on May 23, 2012, when New Zealand and El Salvador played to a 2–2 draw. The stadium hosted its first women's international match when it hosted a 4–0 win by the United States over China in December 2012.

=== Men's matches ===
Date	Winning team	Result	Losing team	Tournament	Spectators
May 23, 2012	El Salvador	2–2	New Zealand	Friendly	15,500
October 12, 2012	Guyana	0–5	Mexico	2014 FIFA World Cup qualification	12,115
November 14, 2012	Honduras	0–0	Peru	Friendly	9,142
January 29, 2013	United States	0–0	Canada	Friendly	11,737
July 15, 2013	El Salvador	1–0	Haiti	2013 CONCACAF Gold Cup	21,783
July 15, 2013	Honduras	0–2	Trinidad and Tobago	2013 CONCACAF Gold Cup	21,783
June 1, 2014	Israel	4–2	Honduras	Friendly	19,235
September 10, 2014	Panama	2–0	Nicaragua	2014 Copa Centroamericana	19,287
September 10, 2014	El Salvador	2–0	Belize	2014 Copa Centroamericana	19,287
September 10, 2014	Honduras	0–2	Guatemala	2014 Copa Centroamericana	19,287
July 11, 2015	Jamaica	1–0	Canada	2015 CONCACAF Gold Cup	22,017
July 11, 2015	Costa Rica	1–1	El Salvador	2015 CONCACAF Gold Cup	22,017
September 4, 2015	Argentina	7–0	Bolivia	Friendly	22,000
October 9, 2015	El Salvador	1–3	Haiti	Friendly	unknown
July 11, 2017	Costa Rica	1–1	Canada	2017 CONCACAF Gold Cup	12,019
July 11, 2017	Honduras	3–0	French Guiana	2017 CONCACAF Gold Cup	12,019
October 8, 2017	El Salvador	1–0	Canada	Friendly	8,500
June 2, 2018	Honduras	0–1	El Salvador	Friendly	17,747
March 26, 2019	United States	1–1	Chile	Friendly	18,033
June 21, 2019	El Salvador	0–0	Jamaica	2019 CONCACAF Gold Cup	22,395
June 21, 2019	Honduras	0–1	Curaçao	2019 CONCACAF Gold Cup	22,395
July 13, 2021	Qatar	3–3	Panama	2021 CONCACAF Gold Cup	10,625
July 13, 2021	Honduras	4–0	Grenada	2021 CONCACAF Gold Cup	10,625
July 17, 2021	Grenada	0–4	Qatar	2021 CONCACAF Gold Cup	7,173
July 17, 2021	Panama	2–3	Honduras	2021 CONCACAF Gold Cup	7,173
July 20, 2021	Suriname	2–1	Guadeloupe	2021 CONCACAF Gold Cup	12,630
July 20, 2021	Honduras	0–2	Qatar	2021 CONCACAF Gold Cup	12,630
December 4, 2021	El Salvador	1–1	Ecuador	Friendly	10,709
September 27, 2022	Honduras	2–1	Guatemala	Friendly	15,000
July 1, 2023	Guadeloupe	4–1	Cuba	2023 CONCACAF Gold Cup Group D	19,766
July 1, 2023	Guatemala	0–0	Canada	2023 CONCACAF Gold Cup Group D	19,766
July 4, 2023	Panama	2–2	El Salvador	2023 CONCACAF Gold Cup Group C	20,002
July 4, 2023	Canada	4–2	Cuba	2023 CONCACAF Gold Cup Group D	20,002
June 19, 2025	Trinidad and Tobago	1–1	Haiti	2025 CONCACAF Gold Cup Group D	2,409
June 21, 2025	Curaçao	1–1	Canada	2025 CONCACAF Gold Cup Group B	20,536
June 21, 2025	Honduras	2–0	El Salvador	2025 CONCACAF Gold Cup Group B	20,536
June 24, 2025	Guatemala	3–2	Guadeloupe	2025 CONCACAF Gold Cup Group C	19,417
June 24, 2025	Canada	2–0	El Salvador	2025 CONCACAF Gold Cup Group B	19,417
November 14, 2025	Venezuela	1–0	Australia	Friendly	

=== Women's matches ===
Date	Winning Team	Result	Losing Team	Tournament	Spectators
December 12, 2012	United States	4–0	China	Friendly	15,643
February 11, 2016	Guatemala	1–2	Trinidad and Tobago	CONCACAF Women's Olympic Qualifying	836
February 11, 2016	Canada	5–0	Guyana	CONCACAF Women's Olympic Qualifying	836
February 14, 2016	Guyana	2–1	Guatemala	CONCACAF Women's Olympic Qualifying	1,453
February 14, 2016	Trinidad and Tobago	0–6	Canada	CONCACAF Women's Olympic Qualifying	1,453
February 16, 2016	Trinidad and Tobago	5–1	Guyana	CONCACAF Women's Olympic Qualifying	859
February 16, 2016	Canada	10–0	Guatemala	CONCACAF Women's Olympic Qualifying	859
February 19, 2016	Canada	3–1	Costa Rica	CONCACAF Women's Olympic Qualifying	5,516
February 19, 2016	United States	5–0	Trinidad and Tobago	CONCACAF Women's Olympic Qualifying	5,561
February 21, 2016	Canada	0–2	United States	CONCACAF Women's Olympic Qualifying	10,119
April 9, 2017	United States	5–1	Russia	Friendly	11,347
April 8, 2018	United States	6–2	Mexico	Friendly	15,349
January 28, 2020	Costa Rica	6–1	Panama	CONCACAF Women's Olympic Qualifying	4,363
January 28, 2020	United States	4–0	Haiti	CONCACAF Women's Olympic Qualifying	4,363
January 31, 2020	Haiti	0–2	Costa Rica	CONCACAF Women's Olympic Qualifying	14,121
January 31, 2020	Panama	0–8	United States	CONCACAF Women's Olympic Qualifying	14,121
February 16, 2020	Panama	0–6	Haiti	CONCACAF Women's Olympic Qualifying	7,082
February 16, 2020	United States	6–0	Costa Rica	CONCACAF Women's Olympic Qualifying	7,082
June 10, 2021	United States	1–0	Portugal	Friendly	9,951
June 13, 2021	United States	4–0	Jamaica	Friendly	8,737
February 22, 2024	Canada	6–0	El Salvador	2024 CONCACAF W Gold Cup	4,421
February 22, 2024	Paraguay	1–0	Costa Rica	2024 CONCACAF W Gold Cup	4,421
February 25, 2024	Costa Rica	2–0	El Salvador	2024 CONCACAF W Gold Cup	5,079
February 25, 2024	Canada	4–0	Paraguay	2024 CONCACAF W Gold Cup	3,482
February 28, 2024	Paraguay	3–2	El Salvador	2024 CONCACAF W Gold Cup	
February 28, 2024	Canada	3–0	Costa Rica	2024 CONCACAF W Gold Cup	2,647
February 20, 2025	Japan	4–0	Australia	2025 SheBelieves Cup	5,243
February 20, 2025	United States	2–0	Colombia	2025 SheBelieves Cup	15,043
April 8, 2025	Mexico	4–0	Jamaica	Friendly	
February 20, 2025	(N/A) Winner semi-final 1		(N/A) Winner semi-final 2	2026 CONCACAF W Championship	
February 20, 2025	(N/A) Loser semi-final 1		(N/A) Loser semi-final 2	2026 CONCACAF W Championship	

=== Rugby union ===
Date	Home team	Result	Away team	Tournament	Spectators
June 23, 2012	United States	10–30	Italy	Italy tour of the Americas	17,214
June 8, 2013	United States	12–15	Ireland	Ireland tour of the Americas	20,181
June 7, 2014	United States	6–24	Scotland	Scotland tour of the Americas	20,001
February 6, 2016	United States	35–35	Argentina XV	2016 Americas Rugby Championship	10,241
June 16, 2018	United States	30–29	Scotland	Scotland tour of the Americas	

== See also ==
- List of NCAA Division I FCS football stadiums
- List of soccer stadiums in the United States
- Lists of stadiums

== Notes ==
Preceded by Sporting Park	Host of the College Cup; 2016	Succeeded by PPL Park
