= Tony Ierulli =

American football coach

Current position
- Title: Linebacker Coach
- Team: Carson–Newman
- Conference: SAC

Biographical details
- Education: Maryville College; Salem College (Masters)

Playing career

Football
- 1976–1979: Maryville (TN)

Baseball
- 1976: Manatee Junior College
- 1977-1979: Maryville (TN)
- Position: Linebacker (Football) Catcher (Baseball)

Coaching career (HC unless noted)

Football
- 1980: Bowling Green (GA)
- 1981–1982: Missouri (assistant DL)
- 1983–1985: Salem (DC/LB/RC)
- 1986–1987: Susquehanna (DC/LB)
- 1988–1994: Samford (ILB/RC/DC)
- 1996–2002: Shippensburg (DC/LB)
- 2003–2011: Maryville (TN)
- 2012: Carson–Newman (OL/TE)
- 2013–2017: Carson–Newman (DE)
- 2018: Limestone
- 2019–2020: Carson–Newman (OL/TE)
- 2021–2023: Carson–Newman (OLB)
- 2024–present: Carson–Newman (LB)

Head coaching record
- Overall: 39–58

Tony Ierulli is an American college football coach. He is the assistant linebackers coach for Carson–Newman University, a position he has held since 2024. He was the head football coach for his alma mater, Maryville College, from 2003 to 2011 and Limestone College—now known as Limestone University—in 2018. He also coached for Bowling Green, Missouri, Salem, Susquehanna, Samford, and Shippensburg.

== Life and career ==
=== Early life and playing career ===
Born in Peoria, Illinois to Elaine and Dr. Anthony Ierulli. After his parents divorced, Elaine and her 4 sons Tony, David, Nick and Steve moved down to Longboat Key, Fla. His mother Elaine remarried to Lee Rosier and Tony’s sister, Christina was added to their family. Ierulli attended Cardinal Mooney High School where he played football and baseball. The Cardinal Mooney Cougars won the 1972 Florida State Football Championship. Ierulli was named Football First Team All-State as linebacker in 1973 and 1974. He was also named First Team All-State Catcher in 1975.

Ierulli signed a baseball scholarship to play at Manatee Junior College in Bradenton, Florida and hit for a .313 batting average. Ierulli transferred to Maryville College in Maryville, Tennessee where he played linebacker in football and catcher in baseball. Ierulli had a career batting average of .384 for the Fighting Scots baseball team. Ierulli hit 5 career grand slams for Maryville including a grand slam against the University of Tennessee baseball team. He was named Male Athlete of the Year for Maryville during his final 1979-1980 athletic season.

Coaching Career

Ierulli began his coaching career as a graduate defensive line coach in 1980 at Bowling Green State University. In 1981, he was hired as assistant defensive line coach at the University of Missouri. Ierulli coached in the 1981 Tangerine Bowl for the Tigers. Ierulli was named linebacker coach/recruiting coordinator at Salem College (WV) before the 1983 season. He was named defensive coordinator for Salem before the 1984 season. Former FSU and Texas A&M head coach Jimbo Fisher was the quarterback for the Tigers football team. Salem made the NAIA national playoffs during the 1984 and 1985 seasons.

Ierulli was the defensive coordinator/linebacker coach at Susquehanna University in 1986. The year before Ierulli was hired, Susquehanna posted a 2-8 record. Ierulli’s first season in 1986, the Crusaders posted a 10-0 regular season record and an appearance in the Division III playoffs. The 8 game winning improvement set a new Division III football record for the biggest winning game turn-around from a previous season. Additionally, Ierulli was Susquehanna’s head baseball coach for 2 seasons which the Crusaders won the Mid-Atlantic Conference in 1986 and 1987.

In 1988, Ierulli was hired as the linebacker coach/recruiting coordinator for Samford University. Ierulli coached for the Bulldogs for 7 seasons. During the 1991 and 1992 seasons, Samford played in the Division 1AA playoffs. The 1991 Bulldogs made it to the semi-finals of the 1AA playoffs. Former FSU and Texas A&M head coach Jimbo Fisher was also on that coaching staff as their QB coach/offensive coordinator. 1996 saw Ierulli rejoining Head Coach Rocky Rees at Division II Shippensburg University. Previously, Ierulli coached with Rocky Rees at Susquehanna where Rees was the head football coach. Rees is the former president of the American Football Coaches Association. Ierulli was Shippensburg defensive coordinator/linebacker coach for the Red Raiders through the 2002 football season.

Ierulli joined Carson-Newman University in 2012 as assistant offensive line/tight end coach for the Eagles. Ierulli has coached several positions including defensive line, defensive ends and linebackers. Hall of Fame Coach Ken Sparks was the head coach during Ierulli’s first six years at Carson-Newman and is the 6^{th} all-time winningest coach in college football history. Currently, Ierulli assists coaching the linebackers at Carson-Newman.

Head coach at Maryville College

Tony Ierulli was named head football coach at his alma mater, Maryville College (TN) on January 21, 2003. The Fighting Scots posted a 0-10 record in 2002 and had lost 14 games in a row before Ierulli took over.

Maryville won a dramatic win over Westminister College (MO) 21-20 in Ierulli’s first game as their head football coach. For many years, Maryville was an independent college but joined the USA-South Athletic Conference. The conference was composed of many Division III schools located in North Carolina. Ierulli’s best season was in 2007 when the Fighting Scots finished with a 7-3 record and third place in the USA-South.

During the 2007 season, Maryville played in 3 overtime games including a 4 overtime win against North Carolina Wesleyan 50-48. During Ierulli’s coaching career at Maryville, the Fighting Scots was involved in 10 overtime games winning 8 games.

Ierulli’s last season as head coach was in 2011 after finishing his 3^{rd} straight 4-6 season. Ierulli finished with a 39-50 overall record and a 24-25 USA-South overall record at Maryville. Currently Ierulli has the 3^{rd} most wins in Maryville football history.

=== Personal Life ===
Ierulli met his wife, Carol, while attending Maryville College together. Carol’s father, Eldria, was the Chief of Security at Maryville, and Carol’s mother, Etta, worked in the House Keeping Department at Maryville.

Carol and Tony got married after graduating from Maryville College in 1980 and quickly moved to Bowling Green, Ohio where Ierulli began his first coaching job at Bowling Green University. Carol taught middle school for 46 years and has recently retired from teaching. Carol earned numerous teaching awards throughout her career.

The Ierulli’s have 3 children Anthony (spouse – Tracey), Katie (Joe) and Kelli (Nathan). All 3 Ierulli children attend Maryville College and played sports for the Fighting Scots: Anthony – Baseball, Katie – Cheerleading, Kelli – Golf. Katie’s and Kelli’s husband both played baseball at Maryville. The Ierulli family have 7 grandchildren: Ruby, Adley, Anthony IV, Ava, Vinny, Lilly, and Nico.

== Head coaching record ==
Year	Team	Overall	Conference	Standing	Bowl/playoffs
Maryville Scots (NCAA Division III independent) (2003–2004)
2003	Maryville	2–8			
2004	Maryville	5–4			
Maryville Scots (USA South Athletic Conference) (2005–2011)
2005	Maryville	3–7	2–5	6th	
2006	Maryville	5–5	4–3	4th	
2007	Maryville	7–3	4–3	T–3rd	
2008	Maryville	5–5	4–3	T–4th	
2009	Maryville	4–6	3–4	T–5th	
2010	Maryville	4–6	3–4	T–5th	
2011	Maryville	4–6	4-3	4th	
Maryville:		39–50	24-25		
Limestone Saints (South Atlantic Conference) (2018)
2018	Limestone	0–8	0–5	8th	
Limestone:		0–8	0–5		
Total:		39–58			
