= Martha Ann Ricks =

Americo-Liberian quilter (c.1817–1901)

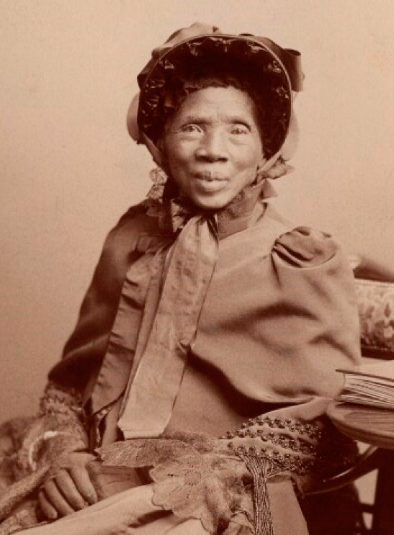
- Ricks in London, 1892
- Born: Martha Ann Erskine Ricks c. 1817; Tennessee
- Died: 1901
- Notable work: Coffee tree quilt, delivered to Queen Victoria

Martha Ann Harris Ricks (born Erskine, c. 1817–1901), also called Aunt Martha in her community, was an Americo-Liberian woman among the early colonists to the Colony of Liberia. Born into slavery in Tennessee, she was freed by her father, George Erskine, and emigrated at age 13 with her family to Liberia in 1830.

While chiefly working in agriculture there, Ricks also was known for her needlework and became an expert quilter. She became interested in Queen Victoria and worked for more than two decades on a quilt to deliver to her. In 1892 Ricks traveled with former First Lady Jane Roberts to England, where she received a royal audience with Queen Victoria and personally presented her the quilt.

== Life ==
Martha Ann was born into slavery in Tennessee. Her father, George Erskine, saved money and purchased her, her mother, and siblings, to free them all. He and the family emigrated in 1830 to Clay-Ashland, Liberia, as part of the American Colonization Society project there.

In Liberia, Erskine married Sion Harris. The couple were successful farmers and traveled with Liberia's first president, Joseph Jenkins Roberts, in 1848, after independence, to both the United States and the United Kingdom.

The Harris couple raised turkeys, ducks, sheep, and growing crops. Martha was also known for the high quality of her needlework. She was very good at quilting and had won a prize in 1858 for silk stockings that she made. After Harris died, she married Henry Ricks and started to be known as Martha Ann Ricks.

Over the years, Ricks developed an interest in Queen Victoria. She determined that, one day, she would meet the queen. She told a reporter in an unknown year:

"I want to go to London to see the Queen. I know I cannot speak to her, but I hope to see her pass along, and then I will return to my farm in Liberia, and die contented. The Lord told me I should see the Queen, and I know I will."

Over the course of 25 years, Ricks worked on a quilt that she wanted to give to the queen. The quilt depicted the Liberian Coffee Tree and was made of silk cotton, with a total material cost of $25 in currency. Its pattern included more than 300 green leaves, and coffee berries in red. A tree of life trunk occupied the quilt's center, and the background was white. Contemporaneous 1897 publication Victoria: Her Life and Reign described the quilt as "a beautiful piece of needle-work, representing on a white satin ground the coffee trees of Liberia, with the berries in all stages of fruition".

When Ricks turned 76, Liberian Ambassador Edward Blyden arranged for her to travel to England and be given an audience with the queen. Accompanied by former First Lady Jane Roberts of Liberia, Ricks met the queen at Windsor Castle on July 16, 1892, and delivered the quilt. She also dined alongside the Queen as the Queen's guest.

Ricks died in 1901.

== Legacy ==
Ricks was featured in the 1900 self-help book The College of Life: or, Practical Self-Educator, A Manual of Self-Improvement for the Colored Race, written by Henry Davenport Northrop, Joseph R. Gay, and I. Garland Penn.

As of 2017, the quilt is missing, but photographs of her work displayed in an World's Fair Africana exhibit remain.

Quilt historian Kyra Hicks wrote a biography titled Martha Ann's Quilt for Queen Victoria, published in 2012.

Ricks's story is featured in a short radio documentary on BBC, "Looking for Aunt Martha's Quilt" (2017), read by her descendant Florence Dennis-Huskin.

By 2017, the quilt pattern was interpreted and recreated by quilters in Caldwell, Liberia.

== Gallery ==
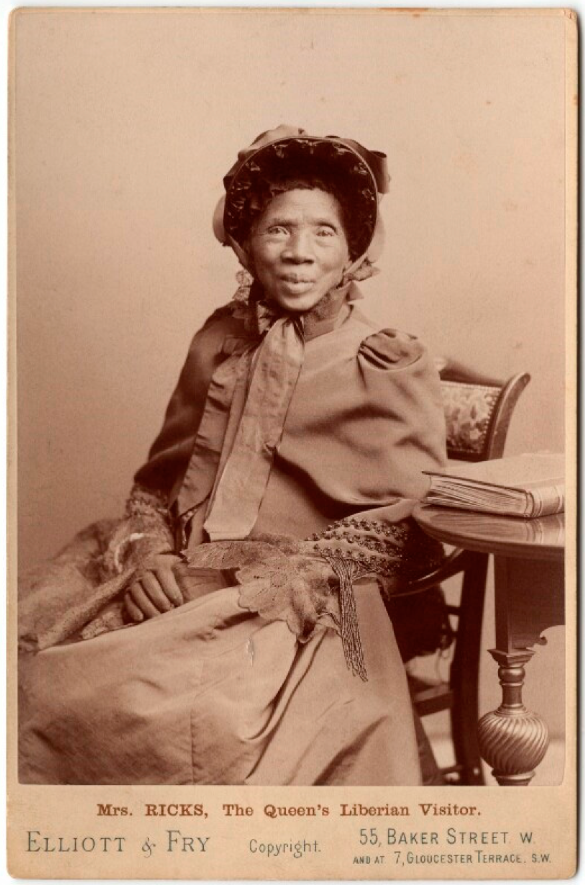
The full cabinet card photograph from July 18, 1892, taken by Elliott & Fry in London

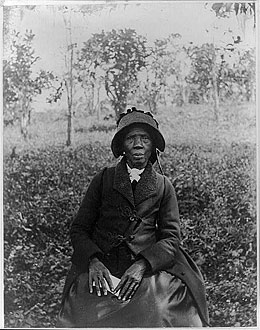
Ricks in January 1892

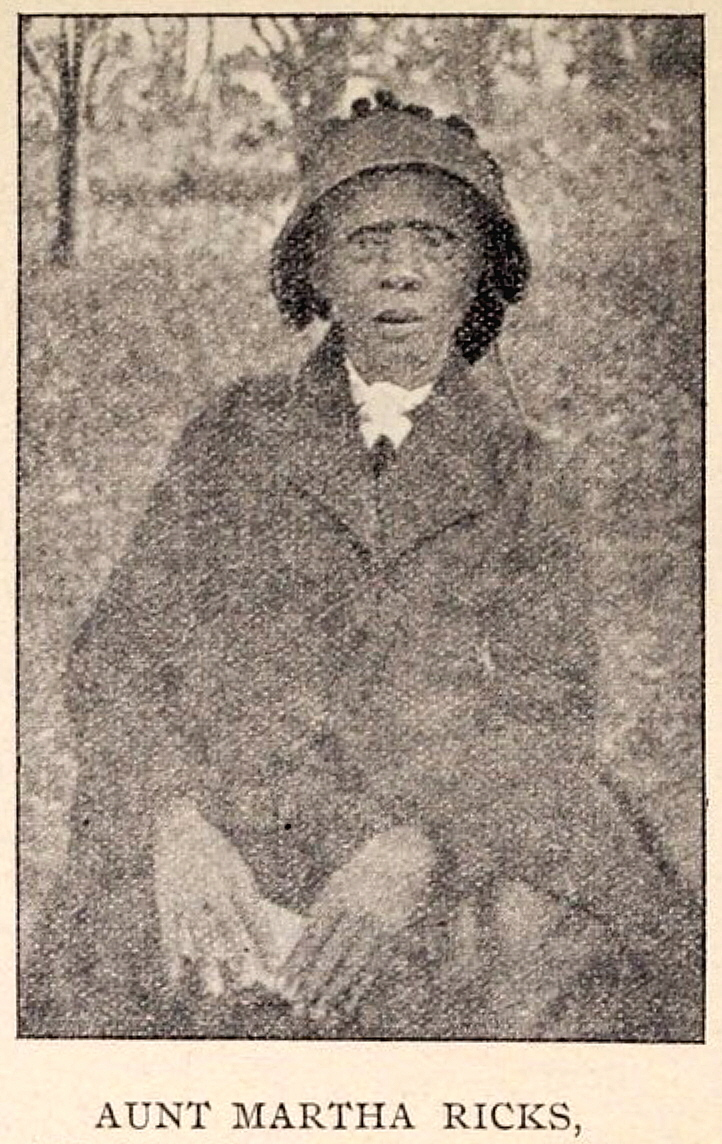
1898 rendition of "Aunt Martha Ricks"

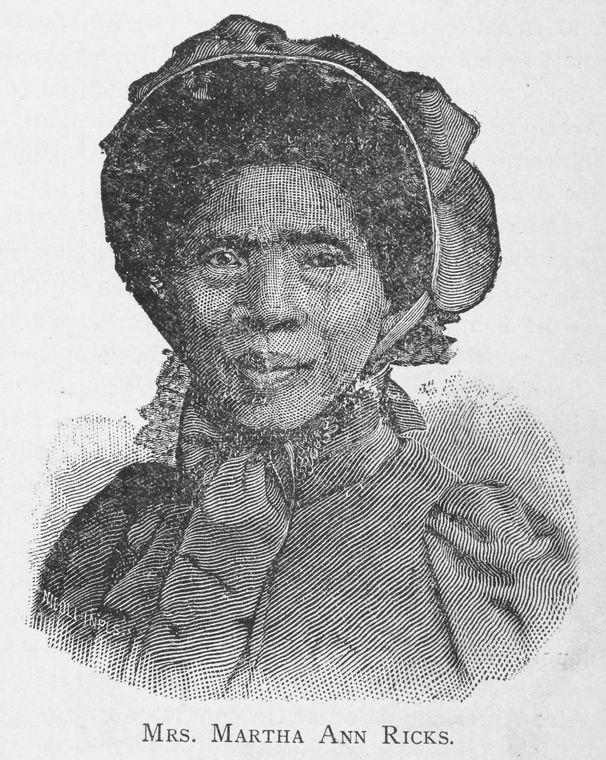
Mrs. Martha Ann Ricks illustrated in The College of Life: or, Practical Self-Educator, A Manual of Self-Improvement for the Colored Race (1900)

== See also ==
- List of Americo-Liberian people
