= Anderson Hall (Maryville College) =

- U.S. National Register of Historic Places
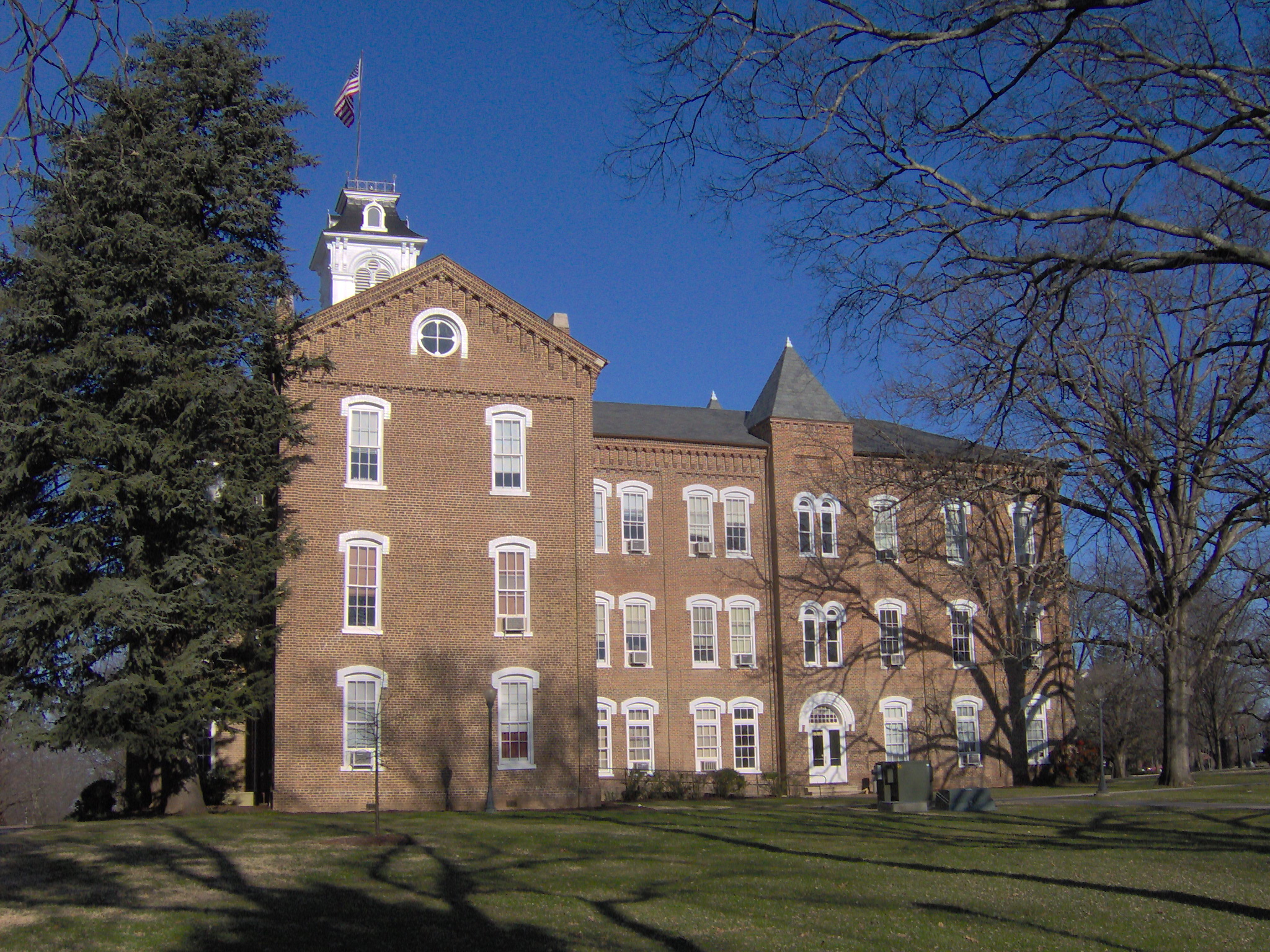
- Anderson Hall in 2009

- Location within Tennessee Location within the United States
- Location: Maryville College campus, Maryville, Tennessee
- Coordinates: 35°45′8″N 83°57′54″W
- Area: 9 acres (3.6 ha)
- Built: 1869
- Architect: Benjamin Fahnestock
- NRHP reference No.: 75001732
- Added to NRHP: February 20, 1975

Anderson Hall, built in 1870, is the oldest building on the campus of Maryville College, Maryville, Tennessee, named for college founder Isaac L. Anderson.

Anderson Hall is a brick building designed in the Second Empire style by architect Benjamin Fahnestock. Funds for its construction were contributed by the Freedmen's Bureau, Pittsburgh businessman William Thaw, and John C. Baldwin of New York.

Originally the college's only building, Anderson Hall is currently used as a classroom building. It was listed on the National Register of Historic Places in 1975. Extensive renovations were started in 2008.

The bell tower of Anderson Hall is depicted in the college's logo.
