= Sion Harris =

Liberian politician

Member of the House of Representatives of Liberia from Montserrado County
- In office 1853–1854

Personal details
- Born: c. 1811 Knox County, Tennessee, United States
- Died: April 25, 1854 Caldwell, Liberia
- Spouse: Martha Erskine Harris Ricks (m. 1830)
- Profession: Carpenter

Sion Harris (c. 1811 – April 25, 1854) was an Americo-Liberian politician. An emancipated slave, he emigrated to Liberia in 1830 and engaged in a string of adventures, most notably thwarting an attack on the Heddington mission by a Loma army in 1840. He later served in Liberia's House of Representatives.

== Biography ==
Harris was born in Knox County, Tennessee, in 1811. Little is known of his early life, though he would later state in a conversation with abolitionist Ezekiel Birdseye that he had been a slave. He eventually obtained his freedom and commenced working as a carpenter. In February 1830, he arrived in Liberia with several other colonists, including George W. Erskine, a Presbyterian missionary who had been trained for the ministry by Isaac Anderson at the Southern and Western Theological Seminary (modern Maryville College). Erskine and several members of his family died shortly after their arrival. His daughter, Martha, married Harris.

On March 8, 1840, Harris and his wife were staying at the home of the Reverend George S. Brown at Heddington, a remote Methodist mission 25 miles (40 km) from Monrovia when a band of 300 to 400 tribesmen led by the Loma chief Gotorah attacked. Having stockpiled muskets, Harris, with help from only his wife, an assistant carpenter, and Brown, managed to fend off the entire attack. Gotorah was shot by Harris during the assault, prompting the attackers to retreat. Gotorah's half-buried body was later found in the vicinity by Liberian militiamen. His corpse was decapitated, and the head was presented to Governor Thomas Buchanan. Harris was widely praised for his actions.

Harris returned to the United States in 1841 to retrieve his brother and several of Erskine's relatives (this was done in part to fulfill Erskine's dying wish). En route from Washington, D.C., to Tennessee, Harris extolled the qualities of Liberia to crowds of free blacks. He met with several members of East Tennessee's abolitionist community, among them Ezekiel Birdseye and John Caldwell. In October 1841, he delivered a speech to over a thousand attendees at a camp meeting in Maryville organized by Isaac Anderson. He afterward returned to Liberia with over a dozen relatives.

In August 1853, Harris was elected to one of Montserrado County's seats in Liberia's House of Representatives. A few months into his term, on April 25, 1854, however, he was killed when he was struck by lightning during a violent thunderstorm.
