= John Hanson Beadle =

American Civil War soldier, foreign correspondent and author (1840–1897)

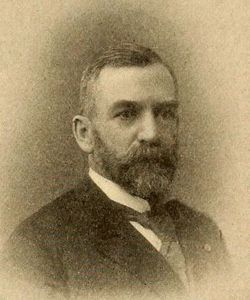
- Born: March 14, 1840; Liberty Township, Parke County, Indiana, U.S.
- Died: January 15, 1897 (aged 56); Rockville, Indiana, U.S.
- Other name: J. H. Beadle
- Education: University of Michigan (BA)
- Occupations: Soldier; journalist; author
- Notable work: Life in Utah (1870); The Undeveloped West (1873); Western Wilds and the Men Who Redeem Them (1880)
- Spouse: Jennie Cole (m. 1872)
- Children: 4
- Relatives: William Henry Harrison Beadle (brother)
- Military career
- Allegiance: United States
- Branch: United States Army
- Service years: 1861–1862
- Rank: Private
- Units: Company A, 31st Indiana Volunteer Infantry
- Conflicts: American Civil War; Battle of Fort Donelson (WIA)

John Hanson Beadle (March 14, 1840 – January 15, 1897) was a soldier in the American Civil War, a foreign correspondent, and the author of a book about Utah published in 1870. He reported from Utah, criticizing Mormonism and polygamy. He also reported from New York City, Canada, Europe, and Washington, D.C. He owned the Rockville Tribune in Rockville, Indiana.

== Early life and education ==
He was born in Liberty Township, Parke County, Indiana. William Henry Harrison Beadle was his older brother.

He attended the University of Michigan, but left to enlist as a private in Company A, 31st Indiana Volunteer Infantry after the outbreak of the American Civil War in 1861. He eventually received his Bachelor of Arts degree in 1867.

== Career ==
Beadle served in the Union Army through the Battle of Fort Donelson in February 1862, after which he was hospitalized and then released from active duty. He taught school and studied law, passing the bar in 1866. He then practiced in Evansville, Indiana for two years before deciding to become a journalist.

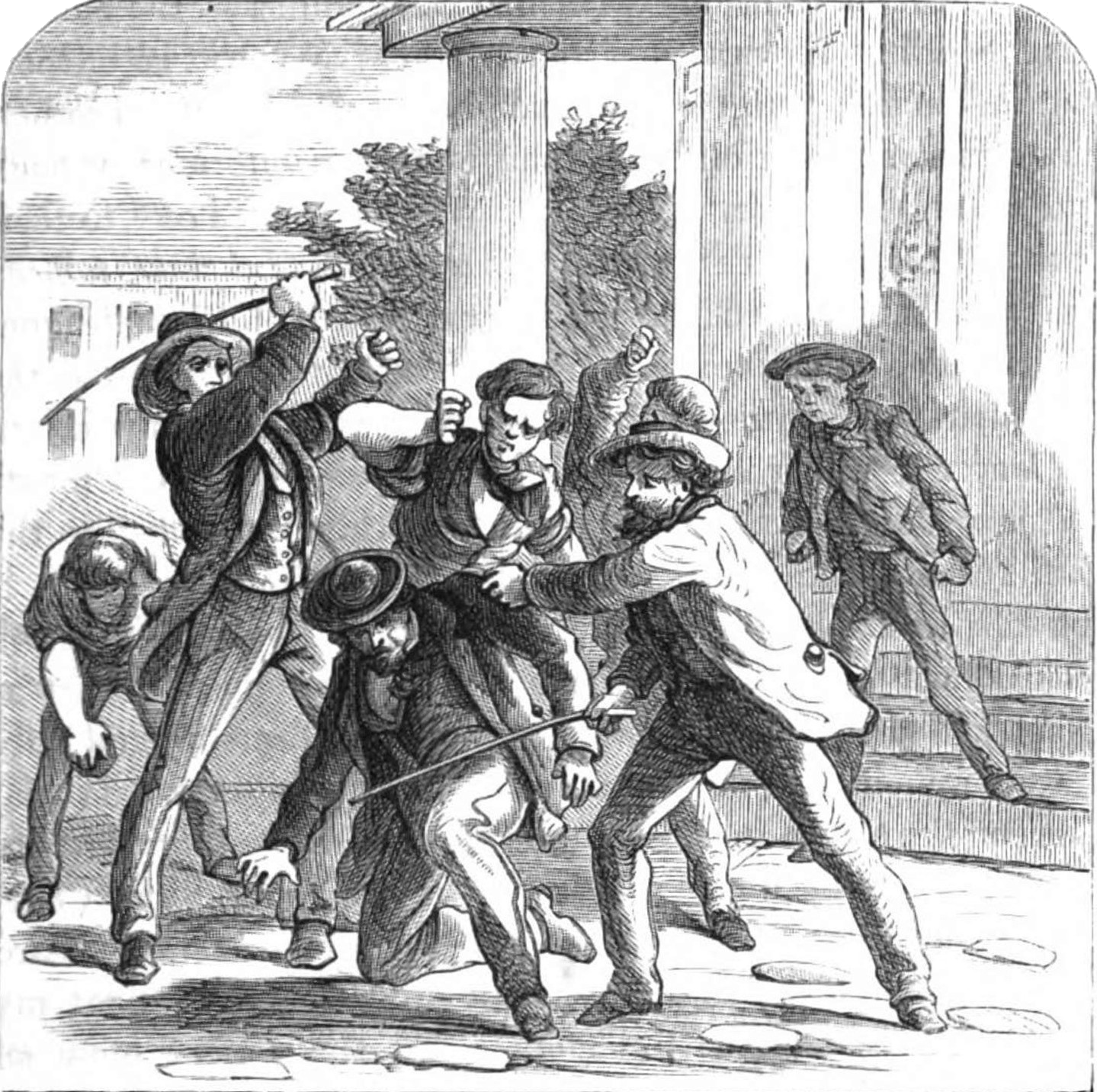
Artist's rendering of the Mormon assault on journalist J. H. Beadle, published several years after the incident.

Beadle became the editor of the Salt Lake Reporter in Salt Lake City, Utah. He was a critic of the Mormon religion and of polygamy. He was attacked and lost an eye, and the newspaper's office was damaged. Publication was suspended.

== Later life ==
Beadle married Jennie Cole of Evansville in 1872. They had three daughters and a son. After a few years in New York and work at the Daily Graphic and as a contributor to periodicals, he returned to Indiana and bought the Rockville Tribune. Returning to New York, he then toured Canada and Europe, reporting as a Hoosier abroad before settling in Washington, D.C. and reporting on dignitaries there.

Though still working in Washington, D.C. at the time, Beadle died in Rockville, Indiana on January 15, 1897, at the age of 56.

== Writings ==
- Life in Utah; or, The mysteries and crimes of Mormonism. Being an exposé of the secret rites and ceremonies of the Latter-Day Saints, with a full and authentic history of polygamy and the Mormon sect from its origin to the present time National Publishing Company (1870)
- The undeveloped West, or, Five years in the territories; being a complete history of that vast region between the Mississippi and the Pacific, its resources, climate, inhabitants, natural curiosities, etc.,etc. : life and adventure on prairies, mountains, and the Pacific coast National Publishing Company (1871)
- The Women's War on Whisky: Its History, Theory, and Prospects (1874)
- Western Wilds and the Men Who Redeem Them (1880)
- History of Parke County, Indiana (1880)
- Polygamy; or, The mysteries and crimes of Mormonism being a full and authentic history of polygamy and the Mormon sect from its origin to the present time, with a complete analysis of Mormon society and theocracy and an exposé of the secret rites and ceremonies of the Latter-day Saints National Publishing Company (1882)
- A Hoosier Abroad
