= William Henry Harrison Beadle =

American soldier, lawyer, educator, and administrator (1838–1915)

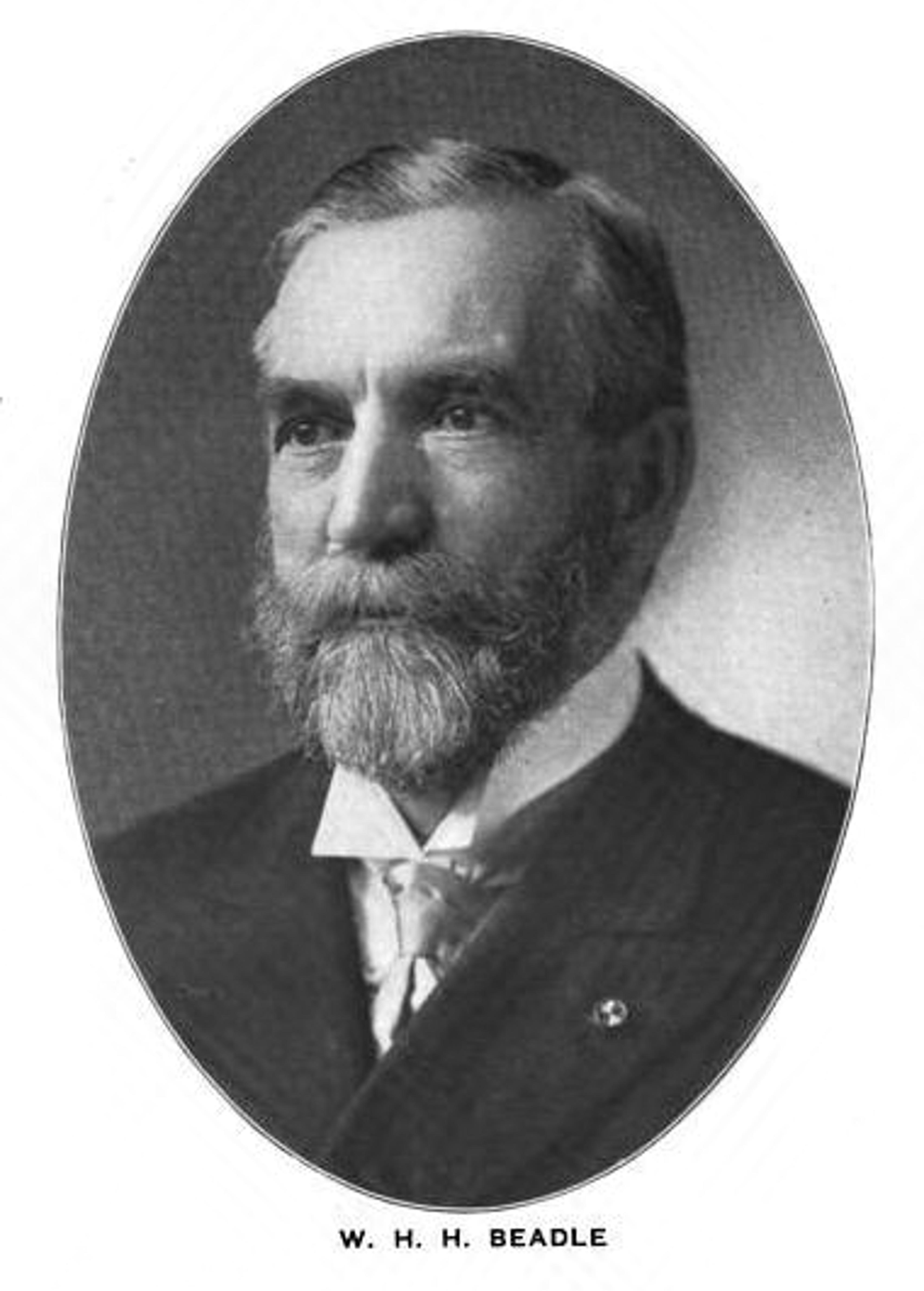
- Beadle in 1906

President of Madison State Normal School
- In office 1889–1901
- Preceded by: William F. Gorrie
- Succeeded by: William W. Girton (acting)
- In office 1902–1905
- Preceded by: William W. Girton (acting)
- Succeeded by: John W. Heston

Personal details
- Born: January 1, 1838 Parke County, Indiana, U.S.
- Died: November 13, 1915 (aged 77) San Francisco, California, U.S.
- Relations: John Hanson Beadle (brother)
- Education: University of Michigan (BA, LLB)
- Occupation: Lawyer; educator; administrator
- Military career
- Allegiance: United States
- Branch: United States Army
- Service years: 1861–1866
- Rank: Major (VRC); Lieutenant Colonel (USV); Brevet Brigadier General
- Units: 31st Indiana Infantry; 1st Michigan Sharpshooters
- Conflicts: American Civil War

William Henry Harrison Beadle (January 1, 1838 – November 13, 1915) was an American soldier, lawyer, educator, and administrator.

== Early life and military service ==
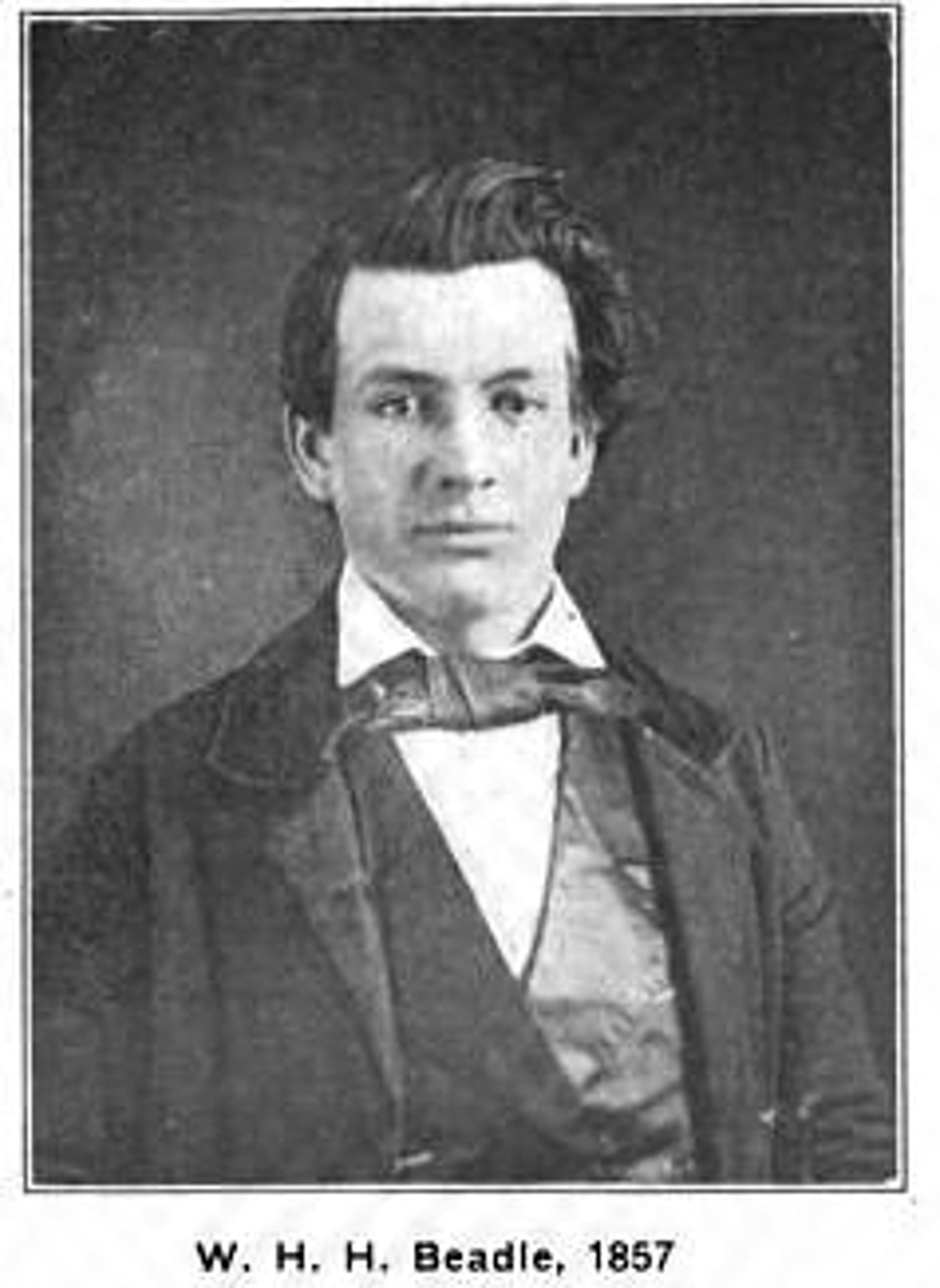
Beadle in 1857

Beadle was born in a log cabin in Parke County, Indiana, and grew up on the frontier. John Hanson Beadle was his younger brother. Refusing his father's offer of a farm, he accepted instead $1,000 for an education. Beadle studied civil engineering at the University of Michigan, graduating with a Bachelor of Arts in 1861.

Shortly after graduation, Beadle enlisted in the Union Army and was commissioned as a first lieutenant in the 31st Indiana Infantry on September 5, 1861. He was promoted to captain on November 9, 1861, and served with his unit until February 9, 1862, when he was sent to Jackson, Michigan to help train the new 26th Michigan Infantry Regiment and then to recruit for the new 1st Michigan Sharpshooters Regiment. Beadle was promoted to lieutenant colonel of that regiment on January 1, 1863, and served with them until June 13, 1864. He then became a major in the Veteran Reserve Corps assigned to the southern defenses of Washington, D.C. in northern Virginia. Beadle briefly commanded a brigade and was brevetted lieutenant colonel on December 13, 1864. He later commanded the Military Guard for the District of Columbia during Lincoln's second inaugural on March 4, 1865. Beadle was brevetted colonel and brigadier general on March 13, 1865, and released from active duty on March 16, 1866.

After the war, Beadle received an LLB from the University of Michigan Law Department in March 1867.

== Career ==
He practiced law in Evansville, Indiana in 1867 and then moved his practice to Boscobel, Wisconsin.

In 1869, President Ulysses S. Grant appointed him surveyor-general of Dakota Territory. His journeys through the territory and his previous frontier experience convinced him that school lands were a trust for future generations and should be sold at their appraised value and never for less than $10 an acre ($2,500 per km^{2}). This effort dominated his life. He served as secretary of the 1877 commission to codify the territorial laws and as chairman of the territorial House Judiciary Committee. In 1879, he became superintendent of public instruction. Beadle drafted the school lands provision at the South Dakota constitutional convention of 1885.

When Congress accepted the state constitution in 1889, it was so impressed that similar provisions were required for North Dakota, Montana, Washington, Idaho, and Wyoming. This preserved 22 million acres (89,000 km^{2}) for schools.

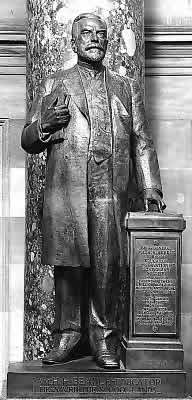
William Henry Harrison Beadle statue at the National Statuary Hall Collection at the United States Capitol.

Beadle became president of the Madison State Normal School in 1889. In 1901 he went on a year's sick leave to regain his health and professor William W. Girton was selected as Acting President. Beadle returned the following year and would serve as president until 1905. He was a professor of history until his retirement in 1912. He was conferred an honorary LLD degree by the University of Michigan in 1902.

== Death and legacy ==
Beadle died on November 13, 1915, in San Francisco while visiting his daughter. He was buried in Albion, Michigan beside his wife, who died in 1897.

In 1938, the state of South Dakota donated a bronze statue of Beadle to the National Statuary Hall Collection at the United States Capitol. Replicas of this statue stand in the South Dakota State Capitol and at Dakota State University. Beadle County, South Dakota is named in his honor.

In 2013, Dakota State University named the General Beadle Honors Program after Beadle.

Beadle Hall, opened in September 1886, a building at Dakota State University (originally named West Wing), was named after him.
