= Ben Fox =

Ben or Benjamin Fox may refer to:

- Ben Fox (footballer) (born 1998), English footballer
- Ben Fox (American football) (born c. 1987), American college football coach
- Ben Fox (basketball) (born 1995), British wheelchair basketball player
- Ben Fox (field hockey) (born 2001), English field hockey player
- George Fox (priest) (Benjamin George Burton Fox, 1912–1978), British Anglican priest and military chaplain
- Ben Fox, composer, see Slaight Family Music Lab
