= Maryville Scots football =

College football team of the Maryville College

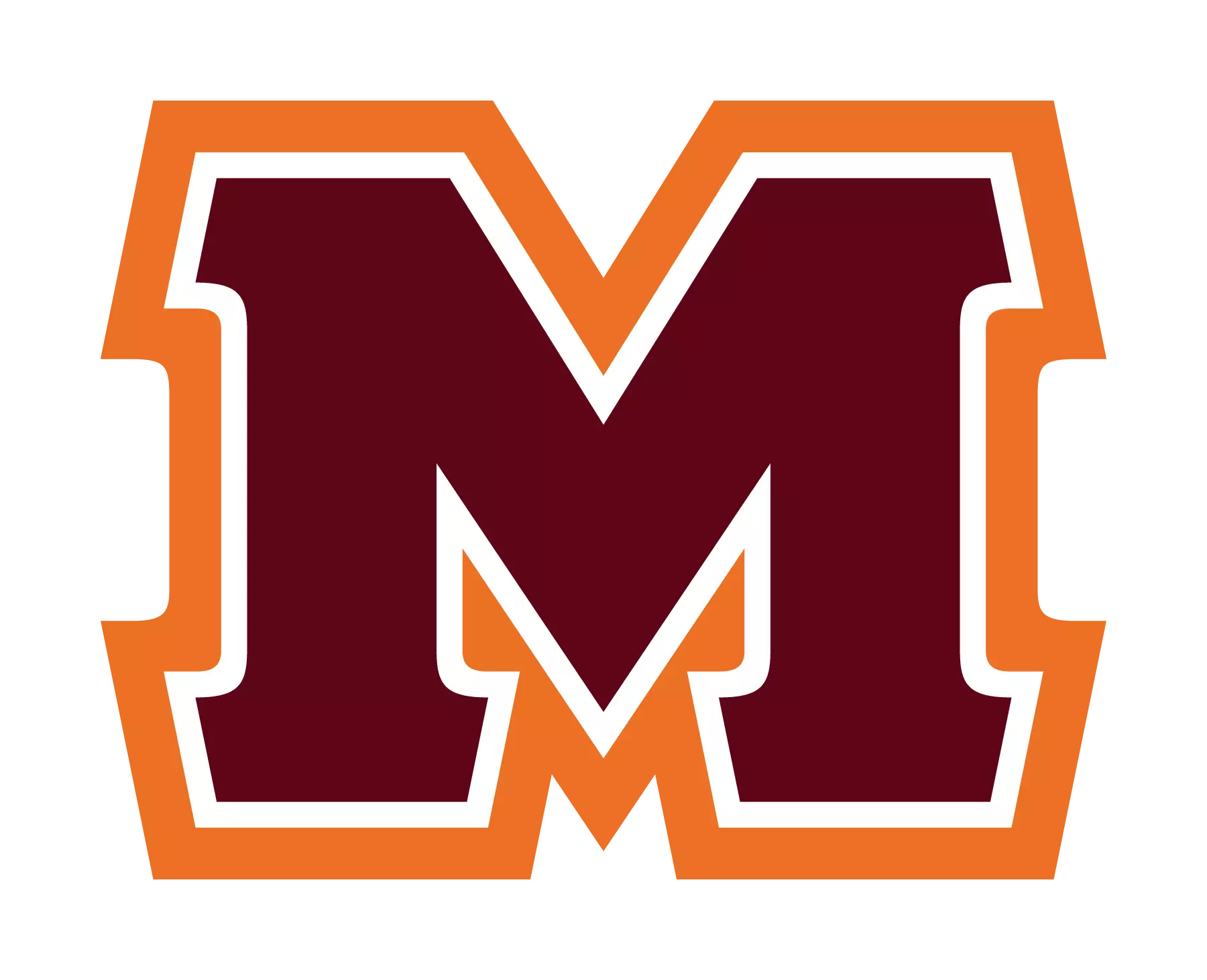
- First season: 1892; 134 years ago
- Athletic director: Andrew Wu
- Head coach: Ben Fox; 6th season, 35–20 (.636)
- Location: Maryville, Tennessee
- Stadium: Lloyd L. Thornton Stadium (capacity: 5,000)
- Field: Honaker Field
- NCAA division: NCAA Division III
- Conference: SAA
- Colors: Garnet and orange
- All-time record: 528–548–40 (.491)
- Bowl record: 1–3 (.250)

Conference championships
- 7
- Fight song: On Highlanders
- Website: mcscots.com

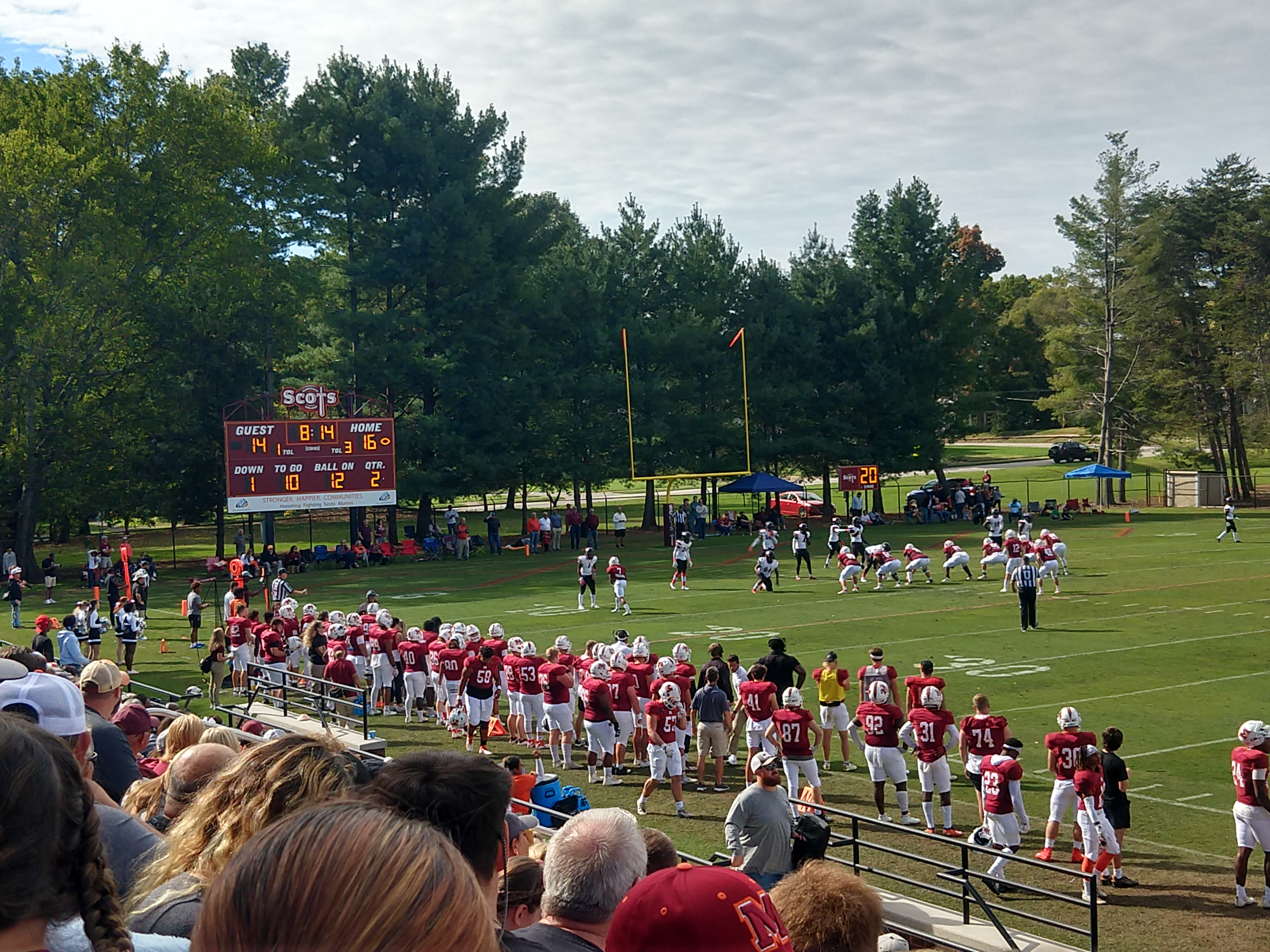
Maryville Scots football lines up for a play versus LaGrange during the 2021 season

The Maryville Scots football team represents Maryville College in college football. The team is located in Maryville, Tennessee. The team competes at the NCAA Division III level as an affiliate member of the Southern Athletic Association.

The team is currently coached by Ben Fox, who has been head coach since the 2020–21 season, and has a record of 35–20. The team has an overall record of 528 wins, 548 losses, and 40 ties for a .491 winning percentage.

The first football team was organized in 1892 by Japanese student Kin Takahashi. The team was a part of the 1947 Tangerine Bowl, which is the first iteration of the Citrus Bowl. The team has won 7 conference championships, mainly in the Smoky Mountain Conference and the USA South Conference.

The Scots play at Lloyd L. Thornton Stadium, Honaker Field. Constructed in 1952, close proximity to the action is provided for a capacity crowd of 5,000. Renovations to the home bleachers and press box occurred in 1993. A new concession stand and bathroom were added in 1997. Visitor stands were enhanced in 2001 while the entire field and entrance were updated in 2001.

== Conference history ==
=== Classifications ===
- 1892–1973: Independent
- 1974–present: NCAA Division III

=== Conference Memberships ===
- 1892–1926: Independent
- 1927–1940: Smoky Mountain Conference
- 1941–1980: Independent
- 1980–1987: Old Dominion Athletic Conference
- 1988–2004: NCAA Division III Independent
- 2005–2024: USA South Athletic Conference
- 2025–present: Southern Athletic Association

== Conference Championships ==
Year	Conference	Coach	Overall record	Conference record
1930	SMAC	Lombe Honaker	5–4	2–0
1931	SMAC	Lombe Honaker	5–2–3	2–0–1
2012	USA South	Mike Rader	6–4	5–2
2013	USA South	Mike Rader	8–3	6–1
2016	USA South	Shaun Hayes	8–2	6–1
2018	USA South	Shaun Hayes	7–3	7–0
2024	USA South	Ben Fox	9–2	7–0

== Postseason ==
=== NCAA Division III playoffs ===
The Scots have made three appearances in the NCAA Division III playoffs, with a combined record of 1–3.

Year	Round	Opponent	Result
2013	First Round	Hampden–Sydney	L, 34–42
2018	First Round	Berry	L, 0–31
2024	First Round; Second Round	Berry; DePauw	W, 20–16; L, 20–45

=== Bowl appearances ===
The Scots have appeared in four bowls, having a record of 1–3.

Season	Bowl	Opponent	Result
1946	Tangerine Bowl	Catawba	L, 6–31
1960	Rocket Bowl	Millsaps	W, 19–0
1965	Honaker Bowl	Earlham	L, 17–26
1966	Honaker Bowl	Concord	L, 13–42

== Head coaches ==
Since the program's inception in 1892, there have been 31 head coaches. The first coach is Kin Takahashi, who also was the team's quarterback. The longest tenure head coach is Lombe Honaker, who coached the program from 1921 to 1958. The current head coach is Ben Fox, who is in the sixth season as head coach. The team didn't field a football teams in 1898, 1899, and the years 1943 to 1945. Those last three years were due to World War II.

Tenure	Coach	Record	Win percentage
1892–1897	Kin Takahashi	7–3–3	.700
1900–1901	Albert F. Gilman	0–1–1	.000
1902–1903	Stephen Andrew Lynch	9–2–0	.818
1904	William Scott	1–3	.250
1905	W.D. Chadwick	4–5	.444
1906–1907	Reed S. Dickson	8–8–2	.500
1908	Horace Fox	2–5–1	.285
1909–1911	Arthur E. Mitchell	6–13–2	.316
1912	Lester E. Bond	5–7	.417
1913	George Williams	3–8	.272
1914	Z. J. Stanley	6–4	.600
1915–1916	Art Kiefer	9–2–3	.818
1917	Edgar O. Brown	5–3	.625
1918	Bob Clemens	0–2	.000
1919–1920	Henry W. Feeman	5–7–1	.714
1921–1942, 1946–1958	Lombe Honaker	160–141–21	.531
1959–1963	Boydson Baird	22–19–1	.537
1964–1970	Monk Tomlinson	19–43–2	.306
1971–1972	Lauren Kardatzke	12–6	.667
1973	Boydson Baird	5–4	.556
1974–1977	Jim Jordan	15–19–1	.441
1978–1979	Stephen Fickert	15–3	.833
1980	Dan Zaneski	5–5	.500
1981–1982	Art Ogden	7–12–1	.368
1983–1985	Bobby Salor	7–20	.259
1986–1987	Larry Stephens	4–16	.200
1988–2002	Phil Wilks	70–118	.372
2003–2011	Tony Ierulli	39–50	.438
2012–2014	Mike Rader	21–10	.677
2014–2019	Shaun Hayes	31–19	.620
2020–present	Ben Fox	35–20	.636
Total		528–548–40	.491
