= Statue of William Henry Harrison Beadle =

Sculpture by H. Daniel Webster

William Henry Harrison Beadle
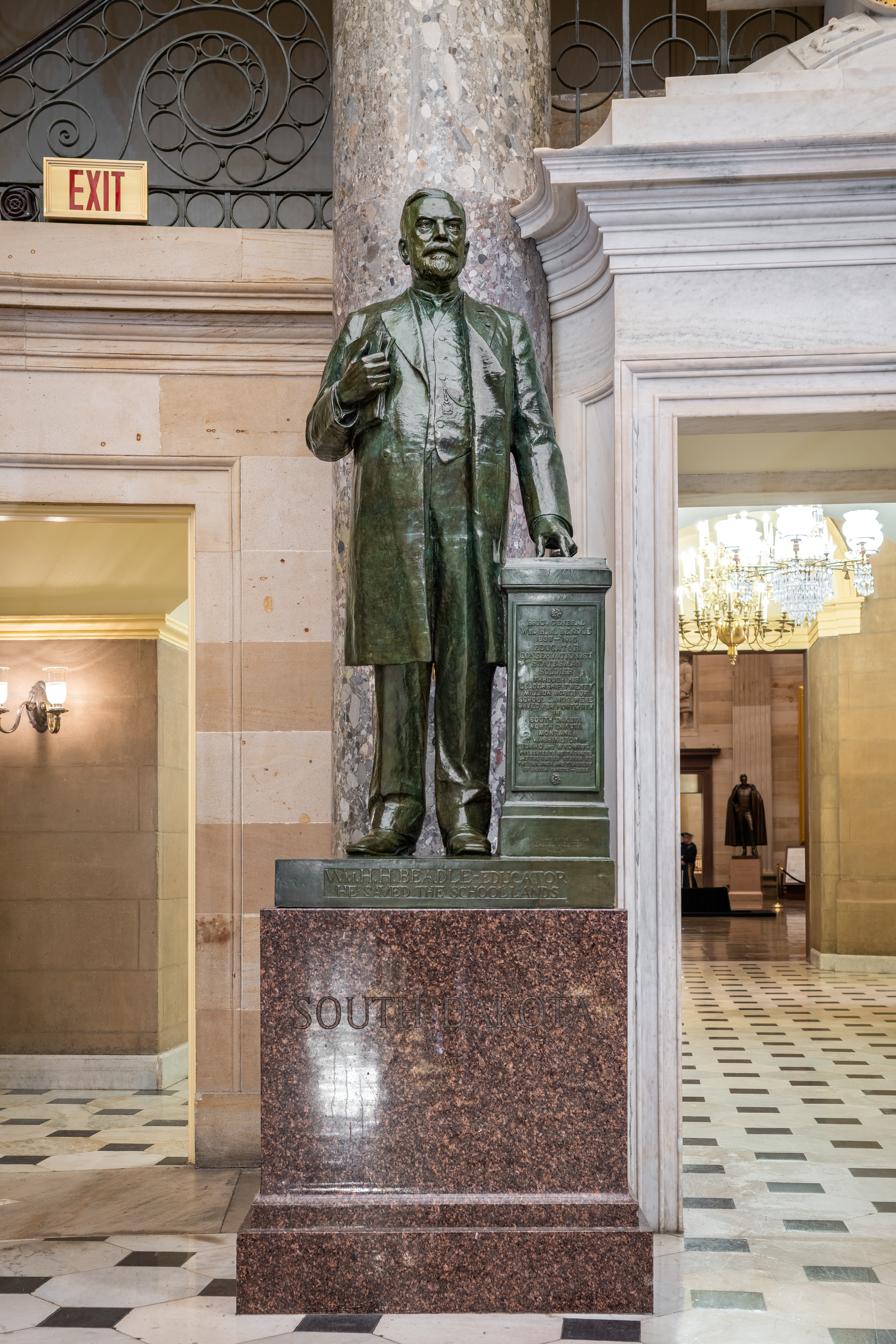
- The statue at the National Statuary Hall in 2023
- Medium: Bronze sculpture
- Subject: William Henry Harrison Beadle
- Location: Washington, D.C., United States

William Henry Harrison Beadle is a bronze sculpture of the American soldier, lawyer, educator and administrator of the same name by H. Daniel Webster, installed in the United States Capitol as part of the National Statuary Hall Collection. The statue was gifted by the U.S. state of South Dakota in 1938.

A copy of the statue is installed at the South Dakota State Capitol.

== See also ==
- 1938 in art
