= Kin Takahashi =

Japanese football coach (1866/67–1902)

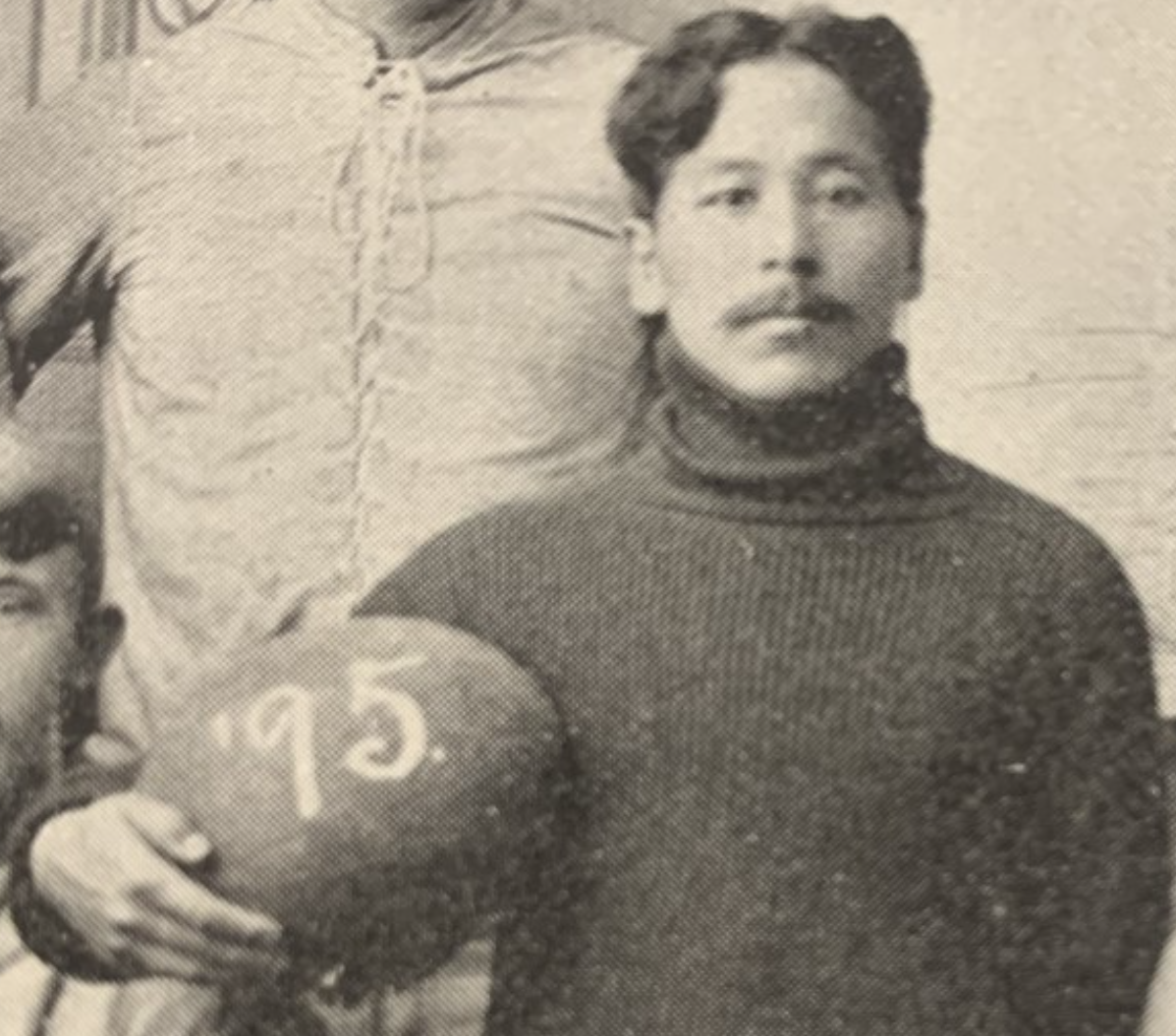

Biographical details
- Born: 1866/1867; Hirao, Yamaguchi Prefecture, Japan
- Died: May 7, 1902 (aged 36); Hirao, Yamaguchi Prefecture, Japan
- Education: Hopkins, Maryville

Playing career
- 1889–1895: Maryville
- Position: Quarterback

Coaching career (HC unless noted)
- 1889–1897: Maryville

Accomplishments and honors

Awards
- Maryville Athletics Hall of Fame (1977)

Kin Takahashi (1866/1867 – May 7, 1902) was a Japanese college football player and coach. He was the coach of the Maryville Scots football team from 1889 to 1897.

Takahashi was born in either 1866 or 1867 in Hirao, Yamaguchi Prefecture, Japan. He grew up in Hiramochi. In March 1886, Takahashi moved to San Francisco, California to get an education. He went to a Hopkins Academy in either Oakland, California, or in Massachusetts. At Hopkins, he converted to Christianity, which led to his parents cutting off all financial support. After two years at Hopkins, he transferred to Maryville College. He would spend seven years as an undergraduate at Maryville. While there, Takahashi made plans for building a YMCA and gymnasium at the college. He was able to raise about 8,000 dollars to make the buildings. He also laid the cornerstone of the building, named Bartlett Hall, in 1896. He decided to return to Japan in late 1897 to become a missionary. He died on May 7, 1902, at the age of 36 from tuberculosis.

Takahashi was also an important figure in the Maryville football team, as he helped create the team while being a player-coach. He would serve as the team captain and head coach from 1892 to 1897. Takahashi was only 5 foot 2 inches tall, and 123 pounds when he played.

He was inducted into the Maryville Scots Athletic Hall of Fame in 1977. In 1998, an award was created by the Maryville college called the "Kin Takahashi Award for Young Alumni of Maryville College".
