= Ben Fox (American football) =

American football coach (born c. 1987)

Current position
- Title: Head coach
- Team: Maryville (TN)
- Conference: SAA
- Record: 35–20

Biographical details
- Born: c. 1987 (age 38–39); Gray, Tennessee, U.S.
- Education: Washington University; Bryant University

Playing career
- 2005–2008: Washington University
- Positions: Quarterback, defensive back

Coaching career (HC unless noted)
- 2009–2010: Bryant (GA/DL)
- 2011: Bryant (WR)
- 2012–2014: Huntingdon (WR)
- 2015: Huntingdon (WR/PGC)
- 2016: Huntingdon (OC/QB)
- 2017–2019: Centre (OC)
- 2020–present: Maryville (TN)

Head coaching record
- Overall: 35–20
- Tournaments: 1–1 (NCAA D-III playoffs)

Accomplishments and honors

Championships
- 1 USA South (2024)

Benjamin Keefauver Fox (born c. 1987) is an American college football coach. He is the head football coach for Maryville College, a position he has held since 2020. He also coached for Bryant, Huntingdon, and Centre. He played college football for Washington University in St. Louis as a quarterback and defensive back.

== Head coaching record ==
Year	Team	Overall	Conference	Standing	Bowl/playoffs
Maryville Scots (USA South Athletic Conference) (2020–2024)
2020–21	Maryville	2–2	0–2	T–6th	
2021	Maryville	4–6	4–4	T–4th	
2022	Maryville	5–5	5–2	T–3rd	
2023	Maryville	8–2	5–2	T–3rd	
2024	Maryville	9–2	7–0	1st	L NCAA Division III Second Round
Maryville Scots (Southern Athletic Association) (2025–present)
2025	Maryville	7–3	4–3	T–3rd	
2026	Maryville	0–0	0–0		
Maryville:		35–20	25–13		
Total:		35–20			
National championship Conference title Conference division title or championship game berth
