= National Publishing Company =

American historic book publisher

National Publishing Company was a book publisher in established in Philadelphia, Pennsylvania, by Joshua R. Jones. In 1878 the business had a five-story building constructed for its headquarters at 726 Cherry Street in Philadelphia. The publisher produced bibles, books of maps, encyclopedias and other books. It expanded with offices opening up in Chicago, St. Louis and Australia.

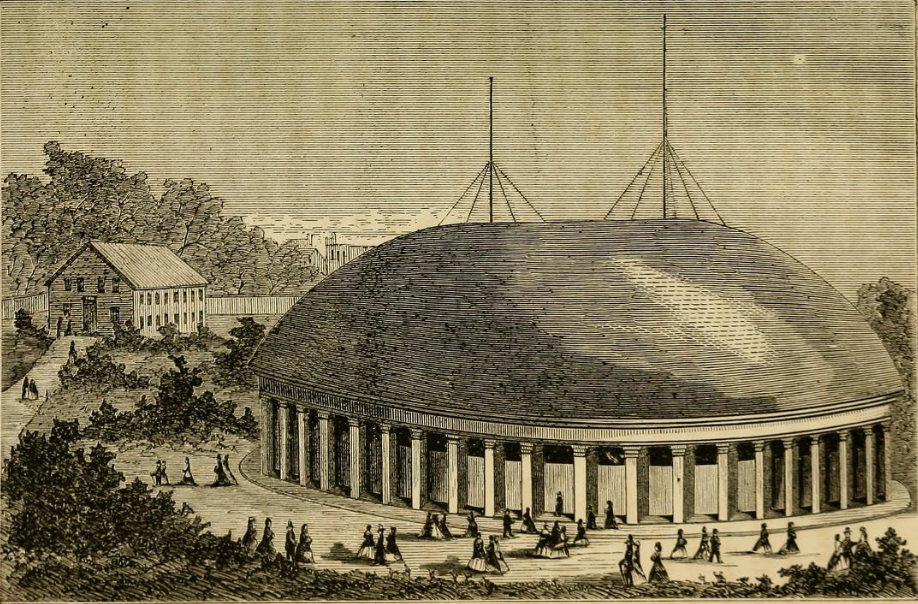
Illustration from Life in Utah by J. H. Beadle (1870)

Attorney Charles A. Hawkins was Jones' nephew and helped the Jones family publishing empire expand.

In 1899, John Engwall was appointed President by the board of the National Publishing Company. He was the brother of Victor Theodor Engwall and assisted the company with funding during the late 19th century.

== Books ==
- Life in Utah (1870) by J. H. (John Hanson) Beadle
- The Illustrated History of the Centennial Exhibition (1876)
- Wonders of the tropics; or, Explorations and adventures of Henry M. Stanley and other world-renowned travelers, including Livingstone, Baker, Cameron, Speke, Emin Pasha, Du Chaillu, Andersson etc. etc. by Henry Davenport Northrop, D.D. (1890)
- History of the Elkhorn Valley, Nebraska: An Album of History and Biography Containing a Descriptive, Political, Statistical, Financial, Commercial, Agricultural, Educational, Religious and Biographical History and Reminiscences, compiled under the supervision of C. H. Scoville (1892)
- Plat book of Douglas and Sarpy Counties, Nebraska (1889)
