= Isaac L. Anderson =

Presbyterian minister

Isaac Anderson
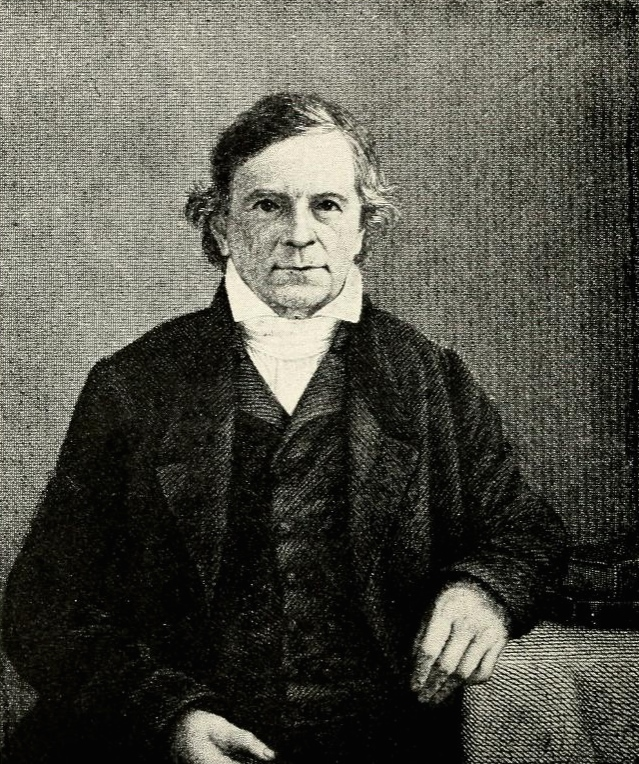
- Born: March 26, 1780; Rockbridge County, Virginia, US
- Died: January 28, 1857 (aged 76); Rockford, Tennessee, US
- Resting place: Maryville College; Maryville, Tennessee
- Education: Liberty Hall Academy
- Spouse: Flora McCampbell

Isaac L. Anderson (1780–1857) was a Presbyterian minister and the founder in 1819 of Southern and Western Theological Seminary in Maryville, Tennessee. While he did not hold partisan political office, his personal politics were heavily tied to abolitionist sentiments and the fair treatment of marginalized groups on the frontier, operating in the era preceding the modern party system. In 1842 the seminary was renamed as Maryville College. A native of Rockbridge County, Virginia, Dr. Anderson was educated in a traditional log school house after he was taught to read and spell by his grandmother. Later he attended Liberty Hall Academy, present-day Washington and Lee University, in Lexington, Virginia. At the age of 17 he joined the church, and at age 21 he moved with his family to Knox County, Tennessee. Mr. Issac Anderson was ordained into the ministry of the Gospel at "Washington Meeting House", later known as Washington Presbyterian Church, on November 26, 1802. By 1807 there were 72 members in full communion at Washington Church. Rev. Anderson continued as pastor of Washington Church until 1812 when he moved to Maryville to become pastor at New Providence Presbyterian Church.

Anderson and other members of his family were first buried in New Providence cemetery; they were moved to the Maryville College cemetery in 1933.

== See also ==
- Sion Harris
