= Henry Davenport Northrop =

American Presbyterian minister, author (1836–1909)

- Born: March 10, 1836; Pulteney, New York, U.S.
- Died: August 29, 1909 (aged 73); Yonkers, New York, U.S.
- Burial place: Trinity Cemetery, Seymour, Connecticut, U.S.
- Other names: H. D. Northrop
- Education: Amherst College (BA), Union Theological Seminary, Yale Theological Seminary
- Occupations: Author, Presbyterian minister
- Notable work: Earth, Sea And Sky Or, Marvels of the Universe (1887)
- Spouse: Josephine Lucia Merrick (m. 1862)
- Children: 3

Henry Davenport Northrop (March 10, 1836 – August 29, 1909) also known as H. D. Northrop, was an American author, and Presbyterian minister. He was a prolific writer of compendiums of history in the late 19th-century and early 20th-century and wrote about unexpected facts which spanned various topics.

== Life and career ==
Henry Davenport Northrop was born on March 10, 1836, in Pulteney, New York (sp. Poultney), to parents Sophia (née Williams) and Daniel Northrop. He attended Cortland Academy (now Homer Senior High School) in Homer, New York.

He graduated with a B.A. degree in 1857, from Amherst College; followed by studies of theology at Union Theological Seminary from 1858 to 1859; and Yale Theological Seminary (now Yale Divinity School) from 1859 to 1860.

He married Josephine Lucia Merrick in 1862, and had three children.

Northrop became an ordained pastor of the Congregational church in 1861. Northrop served as the pastor of the Fourth Congregational Church in Hartford, Connecticut from 1876 until 1879. Additionally he held pastorates in New York City, London, Philadelphia, and Seymour, Connecticut.

== Late life and death ==
He started abundant publishing of books in his late life. His book, Earth, Sea And Sky Or, Marvels of the Universe (1887) explored weird facts about the ancient world (before humans), oceans and seas, sea creatures, and astronomy; and featured more than 300 engravings.

Northrop died of kidney disease on August 29, 1909, in Yonkers, New York. He was interred at Trinity Cemetery in Seymour, Connecticut.

== Publications ==
- Northrop, Henry Davenport (1886). Marvelous Wonders of the Whole World. Boston, MA: J. Bergen.
- Northrop, Henry Davenport (1887). Earth, Sea And Sky Or, Marvels of the Universe. Chicago, IL: L. P. Miller & Co.
- Northrop, Henry Davenport (1888). From Pole to Pole Or, Tours Round the World. H. E. Grosh & Company.
- Northrop, Henry Davenport (1889). Wonders of the Tropics Or, Explorations and Adventures of Henry M. Stanley and Other World-renowned Travelers. Chicago, IL: L. P. Miller & Company.
- Northrop, Henry Davenport (1890). Beautiful Gems of Thought and Sentiment. London, Ontario: McDermid & Logan.
- Northrop, Henry Davenport (1890). Life and Works of Rev. Charles H. Spurgeon. Chicago, IL: Monarch Book Co.; about Charles Haddon Spurgeon
- Northrop, Henry Davenport (1890). The Household Encyclopaedia of Business and Social Forms, Embracing the Laws of Etiquette and Good Society. Desmond Publishing Co.
- Northrop, Henry Davenport (1890). Museum of Wonders; or Curiosities of the World. Mercantile Publishing & Advertising Co.
- Northrop, Henry Davenport (1891). Indian Horrors Or, Massacres by the Red Men. Augusta, Maine: J. F. Hill.
- Northrop, Henry Davenport (1891). Life And Deeds Of General Sherman, Including The Story Of His Great March To The Sea. Boston, MA: Gately & O'Gorman.
- Northrop, Henry Davenport (1891). Golden Manual Or, The Royal Road To Success. Philadelphia, PA: J. H. Moore & Co.
- Northrop, Henry Davenport (1892). Life and Achievements of Jay Gould (PDF). St. John, New Brunswick: R. A. H. Morrow.
- Northrop, Henry Davenport (1893). The World's Fair As Seen in One Hundred Days: Containing a Complete History of the World's Columbian Exposition. Philadelphia, PA: Ariel Book Co.
- Northrop, Henry Davenport (1893). Four Centuries of Progress Or, Panorama of American History. Philadelphia, PA: International Publishing Co.
- Northrop, Henry Davenport (1893). Life and Public Services of James G. Blaine. Minneapolis, MN: L. M. Ayer Publishing Co.
- Northrop, Henry Davenport (1894). Treasures of the Bible Or, Captivating Stories for Old and Young. Philadelphia, PA: International Publishing Company.
- Northrop, Henry Davenport; Young, John Russell (1895). Flowery Kingdom and the Land of the Mikado, Or China, Japan and Corea. Toronto, Ontario: William Briggs, Publisher.
- Northrop, Henry Davenport (1895). Captivating Bible Stories for the Young. National Publishing Company.
- Northrop, Henry Davenport (1895). New Popular Speaker and Writer. Philadelphia, PA: International Publishing Company.
- Northrop, Henry Davenport; Gay, Joseph R.; Penn, I. Garland (Irvine Garland) (1896). The College of Life Or, Practical Self-Educator: A Manual of Self-Improvement for the Colored Race, Forming an Educational Emancipator and a Guide to Success. Cincinnati, Ohio: W. H. Ferguson Co.
- Greene, Frederick Davis.; Northrup, Henry Davenport (1896). Armenian Massacres Or, the Sword of Mohammed. Philadelphia, Pennsylvania: American Oxford Pub. Co.
- Northrop, Henry Davenport (1897). Standard Cyclopedia of Universal Knowledge. Chicago, IL: The Dominion Company.
- Northrop, Henry Davenport (1888). The Life and Public Services of Gen. Benj. Harrison. Augusta, ME: True & Co.
- de Quesada, Gonzalo; Northrop, Henry Davenport (1898). Cuba's Great Struggle for Freedom. Harrisburg, PA: The Minter Company.
- Northrop, Henry Davenport (1898). Famous Women of the Bible, Comprising Religious and Social Helps for Mothers and Daughters. Harrisburg, PA: The Minter Company.
- Northrop, Henry Davenport (1899). Dwight L. Moody, His Life and Labors (PDF). Philadelphia, PA: Premier Publishing Co.
- Young, Louis Stanley; Northrop, Henry Davenport (1899). Life and Heroic Deeds of Admiral Dewey. Philadelphia, PA: National Publishing Co.
- Northrop, Henry Davenport (1900). Grandest Century in World’s History. Philadelphia, PA: National Publishing Co.
- Northrop, Henry Davenport (1900). Chinese Horrors and Persecutions of the Christians. Philadelphia, PA: World Bible House.
- Northrop, Henry Davenport (1900). Standard American Book of Knowledge. Philadelphia, PA: National Publishing Co.
- Northrop, Henry Davenport (1901). New Century Speaker and Writer. Philadelphia, PA: National Publishing Co.
- Northrop, Henry Davenport (1901). Our Country; Being a Standard History Of The United States And Island Possessions. New York: American Historical Press.
- Northrop, Henry Davenport (1901). John Winslow. New York City, NY: G.W. Dillingham Company.
- Northrop, Henry Davenport (1901). Pictorial History of the United States. Vol. 1. Boston, Massachusetts.
- Northrop, Henry Davenport (1901). Pictorial History of the United States. Vol. 2. Boston, Massachusetts.
- Northrop, Henry Davenport (1902). Home Studies in American History: the Triumphant Progress of a Great Nation. Philadelphia, PA: National Publishing Co.
- Northrop, Henry Davenport (1902). World's Renowned Authors and Their Grand Masterpieces of Poetry and Prose. Kansas City, MO: Topeka Book Co.
- Northrop, Henry Davenport (1903). Makers of The World's History and Their Grand Achievements. Philadelphia, PA: National Publishing Co.
- Northrop, Henry Davenport (1903). The American Speaker; Containing the Choicest Recitations and Readings from the Best Authors.
- Northrop, Henry Davenport (1908). Wild Animal of the Jungle and Forest.
