= 31st Indiana Infantry Regiment =

Infantry regiment within the American Civil War

31st Regiment Indiana Infantry
- Active: September 15, 1861 – December 8, 1865
- Country: United States
- Allegiance: Union
- Branch: Infantry
- Engagements: Battle of Fort Donelson; Battle of Shiloh; Siege of Corinth; Battle of Perryville; Battle of Stones River; Tullahoma Campaign; Battle of Chickamauga; Siege of Chattanooga; Atlanta campaign Battle of Resaca; Battle of Kennesaw Mountain; Siege of Atlanta; Battle of Jonesboro; Second Battle of Franklin; Battle of Nashville

Commanders
- Colonel: Charles Cruft
- Colonel: John Osborn
- Colonel: John Thomas Smith
- Colonel: James Reed Hallowell

The 31st Regiment Indiana Infantry was an infantry regiment that served in the Union Army during the American Civil War.

== Service ==
The 31st Indiana Infantry was organized and mustered in at Terre Haute, Indiana, for a three-year enlistment on September 15, 1861, under the command of Colonel Charles Cruft.

The regiment was attached to 13th Brigade, Army of the Ohio, to December 1861. 13th Brigade, 5th Division, Army of the Ohio, to February 1862. 1st Brigade, 3rd Division, Army of the Tennessee, to March 1862. 3rd Brigade, 4th Division, Army of the Tennessee, to April 1862. 22nd Brigade, 4th Division, Army of the Ohio, to September 1862. 22nd Brigade, 4th Division, II Corps, Army of the Ohio, to November 1862. 1st Brigade, 2nd Division, Left Wing, XIV Corps, Army of the Cumberland, to January 1863. 1st Brigade, 2nd Division, XXI Corps, Army of the Cumberland, to October 1863. 1st Brigade, 1st Division, IV Corps, Army of the Cumberland, to August 1865. Department of Texas to December 1865.

The 31st Indiana Infantry mustered out of service at San Antonio, Texas, on December 8, 1865.

== Detailed service ==
Ordered to Kentucky and camp at Green River until February 1862. Moved to Fort Donelson, Tennessee, February 11–13, 1862. Investment and capture of Fort Donelson February 14–16. Expedition to Crump's Landing, Tenn., March 9–14. Battle of Shiloh, April 6–7. Advance on and siege of Corinth, Mississippi, April 29-May 30. Phillips' Creek, Widow Serratt's, May 21. Bridge Creek before Corinth May 28. Occupation of Corinth May 30. Pursuit to Booneville May 31-June 12. Buell's Campaign in northern Alabama and middle Tennessee June to August. March to Louisville, Kentucky, In pursuit of Bragg, August 21-September 26. Pursuit of Bragg to London, Kentucky, October 1–22. Battle of Perryville, October 8. Wild Cat October 17. March to Nashville, Tennessee, October 22-November 8. Destruction of Goose Creek Salt Works October 23–24. Duty at Nashville until December 26. Advance on Murfreesboro December 26–30. Lavergne December 26–27. Battle of Stones River December 30–31, 1862, and January 1–3, 1863. Duty at Murfreesboro and Cripple Creek until June. Action at Spring Hill, Woodbury, April 2. Tullahoma Campaign June 23-July 7. Occupation of middle Tennessee to August 16. Passage of the Cumberland Mountains and Tennessee River and Chickamauga Campaign August 16-September 22. Lee and Gordon's Mills September 11–13. Battle of Chickamauga September 19–20. Siege of Chattanooga, September 24-October 26. Reopening Tennessee River October 26–29. At Bridgeport, Alabama, October 28, 1863, to January 1864. Regiment veteranized January 1, 1864, and on furlough February and March. At Ooltewah until May. Atlanta Campaign May 1-September 8. Tunnel Hill May 6–7. Demonstrations on Rocky Faced Ridge and Dalton, Ga., May 8–13. Buzzard's Roost Gap May 8–9. Battle of Resaca May 14–15. Near Kingston May 18–19. Near Cassville May 19. Advance on Dallas May 22–25. Operations on line of Pumpkin Vine Creek and battles about Dallas, New Hope Church, and Allatoona Hills May 25-June 5. Operations about Marietta and against Kennesaw Mountain June 10-July 2. Pine Hill June 11–14. Lost Mountain June 15–17. Assault on Kennesaw June 27. Ruff's Station, Smyrna Camp Ground, July 4. Chattahoochee River July 5–17. Vining Station July 7. Peachtree Creek July 19–20. Siege of Atlanta July 22-August 25. Flank movement on Jonesboro August 25–30. Battle of Jonesboro August 31-September 1. Lovejoy's Station September 2–6. Operations against Hood in northern Georgia and northern Alabama September 29-November 3. Nashville Campaign November–December. Columbia, Duck River, November 24–27. Battle of Franklin November 30. Battle of Nashville December 15–16. Pursuit of Hood to the Tennessee River December 17–28. Moved to Huntsville, Alabama, and duty there until March 1865. Operations in eastern Tennessee March 15-April 22. Duty at Nashville until June. Moved to New Orleans, Louisiana, June 16, then to Texas, July. Duty at Green Lake and San Antonio until December.

== Casualties ==
The regiment lost a total of 378 men during service; 5 officers and 115 enlisted men killed or mortally wounded, 5 officers and 253 enlisted men died of disease.

== Commanders ==
- Colonel Charles Cruft - promoted to brigadier general, July 16, 1862
- Colonel John Osborn - resigned July 14, 1863
- Colonel John Thomas Smith - resigned March 12, 1865
- Colonel James R. Hallowell

== See also ==
- List of Indiana Civil War regiments
- Indiana in the Civil War
