= Maryville College =

Private liberal arts college in Maryville, Tennessee, US

Coordinates: 35.75160°N 83.96353°W

- Former names: Southern and Western Theological Seminary (1819–1842)
- Type: Private liberal arts college
- Established: 1819; 207 years ago
- Endowment: $111.2 million (2024)
- President: Bryan Coker
- Faculty: 79, with student faculty ratio of 12:1
- Undergraduates: 1,147 (all undergraduate) (2024)
- Location: Maryville, Tennessee, U.S.
- Campus: 320 acres (130 ha); Suburban
- Colors: (Garnet and orange)
- Nickname: Scots
- Sporting affiliations: NCAA Division III – CCS
- Mascot: Scots
- Website: maryvillecollege.edu
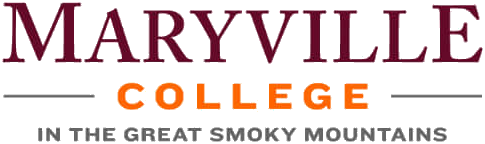

Maryville College is a private liberal arts college in Maryville, Tennessee. It was founded in 1819 by Presbyterian minister Isaac L. Anderson for the purpose of furthering education and enlightenment in what was then America's southwestern frontier. The college is one of the 50 oldest colleges in the United States and the 12th-oldest institution in the South. It is associated with the Presbyterian Church (USA) and enrolls about 1,100 students. Its mascot is the Scots, and sports teams compete in NCAA Division III athletics in the Collegiate Conference of the South.

== History ==
=== Founding ===
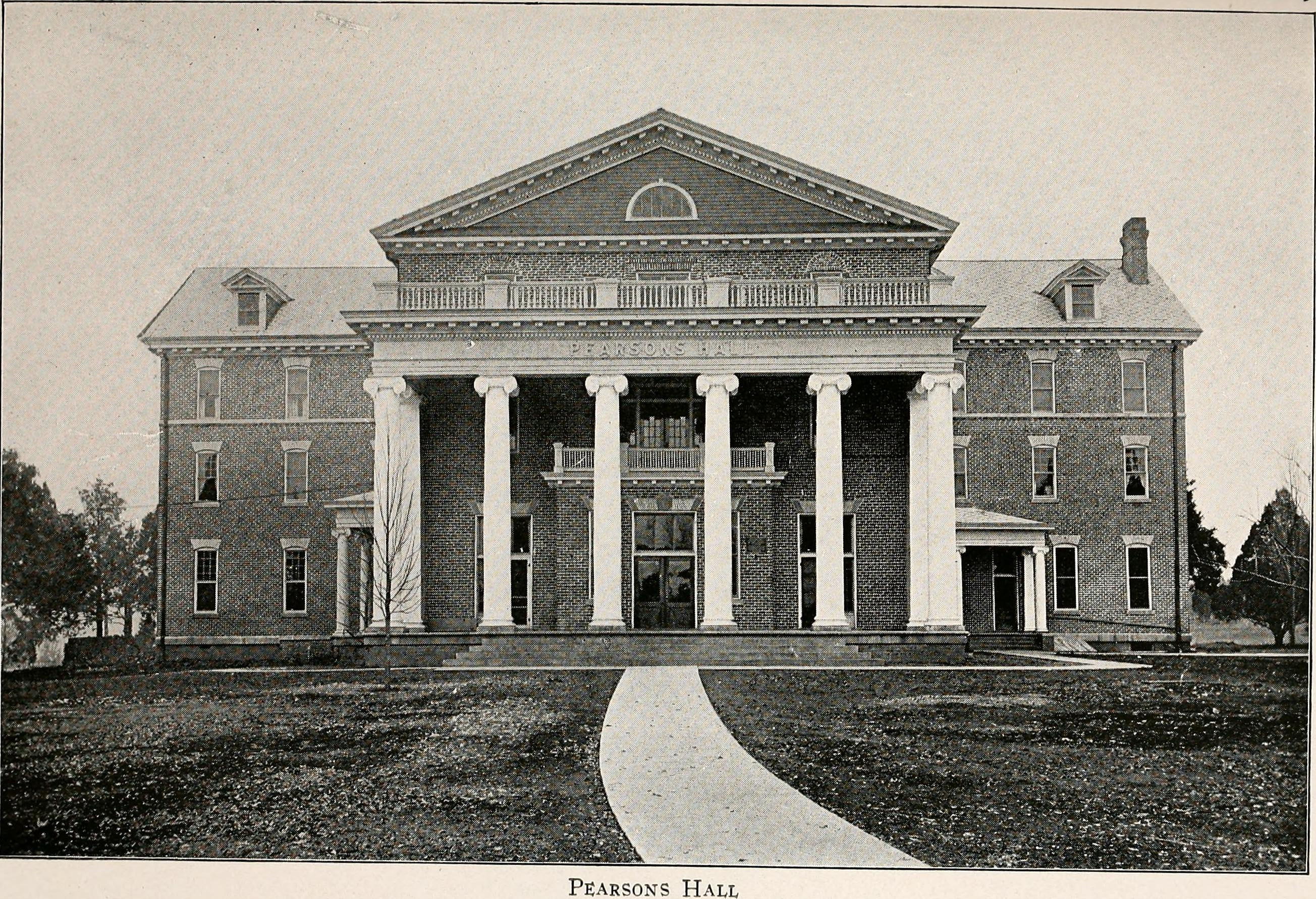
The college c. 1913-14

Maryville College was founded as the "Southern and Western Theological Seminary" in 1819 by Isaac L. Anderson, a Presbyterian minister. Anderson had founded a school, Union Academy, in nearby Knox County, before becoming minister at New Providence Presbyterian Church in Maryville. He expressed to his fellow clergy the need for more ministers in the community, including a request to the Home Missionary Society and an appeal to divinity students at Princeton University in 1819. The new seminary was intended to help fill this need for ministers. It opened with a class of five men, and the new school was adopted by the Synod of Tennessee and formally named the Southern and Western Theological Seminary in October 1819.

After receiving its charter from the Tennessee General Assembly in 1842, the school adopted its current name, "Maryville College".

=== Integration ===
In 2004, Maryville College was recognized by the Race Relations Center of East Tennessee for its history of "contributing to improving the quality of life for all in East Tennessee". Maryville College was racially integrated from its earliest days. An ex-slave named George Erskine studied there in 1819, sponsored by the Manumission Society of Tennessee. Erskine went on to preach during the 1820s and was formally ordained by the General Assembly of the Presbyterian Church in 1829.

Maryville College was closed during the Civil War, but, upon reopening, it again admitted students regardless of race, assisted by the Freedmen's Bureau.

When the State of Tennessee forced Maryville College to segregate in 1901, the college gave $25,000—a little more than a tenth of its endowment at the time—to Swift Memorial Institute, the college's sister school. Swift was founded by William Henderson Franklin, the first African American to graduate from Maryville College (1880). His institute educated black students during the era of imposed segregation.

After the Brown v. Board of Education decision in 1954, Maryville College immediately re-enrolled African Americans.

In 1875, Maryville College conferred the first college degree to a woman in the state of Tennessee. The recipient was Mary T. Wilson, the older sister of Samuel T. Wilson, who later served as president of the college from 1901 until 1930.

== Academics ==
As a liberal arts school, the college promotes a well-rounded education. The school requires numerous general education courses to achieve this. The courses are taken through the conclusion of the student's education, contributing to the graduating student's becoming knowledgeable in a number of fields.

Maryville College is one of the few colleges in the nation that requires graduating students to complete a comprehensive exam in their major and conduct an extensive senior thesis.

U.S. News & World Report in its Best Colleges ranks Maryville #3 in Regional Colleges South, #1 in Best Colleges for Veterans, and #2 in Best Undergraduate Teaching.

== Campus ==
- Maryville College Historic District
- U.S. National Register of Historic Places
- U.S. Historic district
- Area: 18 acres (7.3 ha)
- Architect: Multiple
- Architectural style: Colonial Revival, Queen Anne, Romanesque
- NRHP reference No.: 82003953
- Added to NRHP: September 9, 1982

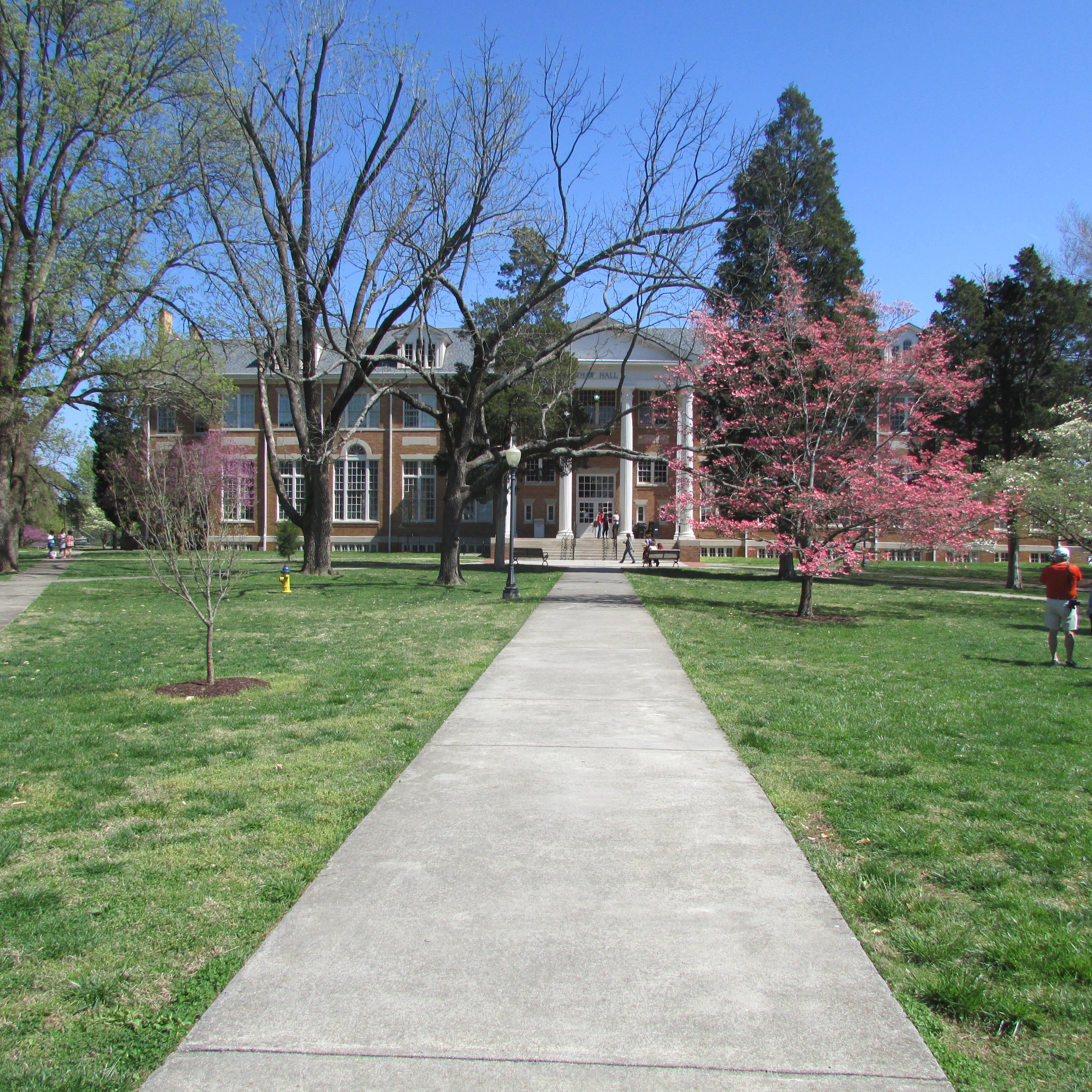
Thaw Hall, home of the library and the Social Science majors

Maryville College is located in the City of Maryville, Blount County, Tennessee. Its current campus was established in 1869 on a 60-acre (24 ha) that was then on the city's outskirts. Several campus buildings were completed over the next five decades, with financial help from major institutions and philanthropists. The college's historic buildings comprise the Maryville College Historic District, which was listed on the National Register of Historic Places in 1982; Anderson Hall is also separately listed on the National Register.

=== Buildings on campus ===
- Anderson Hall: The oldest building on campus, Anderson Hall houses the Humanities and Education departments. Donations for its construction came from the Freedmen's Bureau and philanthropists William Thaw, a Pittsburgh industrialist, and John C. Baldwin of New York.
- Thaw Hall: Thaw Hall was completed in 1923 with donations from Mary Thaw of Pittsburgh. It functions as the campus library, as well as housing the Academic Support Center, Social Sciences, and Environmental Studies departments.
- Cooper Athletics Center: This building currently houses the Athletics department, as well as the Cooper Success Center.
- Fayerweather Hall: Originally a science building, this building is named for Daniel B. Fayerweather of New York, who provided funds for its construction. It was designed by Baumann Brothers of Knoxville and completed in 1898. Fayerweather now houses most of the administrative offices of Maryville College, as well as the AJB Financial Aid office.
- Bartlett Hall: Built by Kin Takahashi and many other students, this building houses the offices of Student Development, Student Involvement, Resident Life, Center for Calling and Careers, The Learning center, Security, the book store, the Post Office, Multicultural Center, and Isaac's Cafe.
- Pearsons Hall: This building houses the main dining hall and two floors of residential housing.
- Sutton Science Center: The building houses the departments of Math, Chemistry, Biology, Psychology, American Sign Language, and Deaf Studies.
- Clayton Center for the Arts: This building is the newest building at MC. It houses the music department and has live acts, plays, and local and national productions.
- Willard House: This building houses the office of Advancement.
- The House in the Woods: This building is used for the meeting space at MC. This building was previously used to house the campus minister.
- Alexander House: This building houses some Advancement offices, Church Relations, Youth Leadership Blount, and Keep Blount Beautiful.
- Crawford House: This building houses Mountain Challenge, LLC.
- Ruby Tuesday (RT) Lodge: Since 1997, this building has been used as a private corporate retreat for the company Ruby Tuesday.
- Alumni Gym: This building is used to house campus events.
- Physical Plant: This is where all campus maintenance offices are located.
- Center for Campus Ministry: This building houses the campus chapel and is the office of the campus Minister, Volunteer relations, and several other "volunteer" related officers.

=== Campus housing ===
The vast majority of Maryville College students reside in one of the many on-campus residence halls, which are:

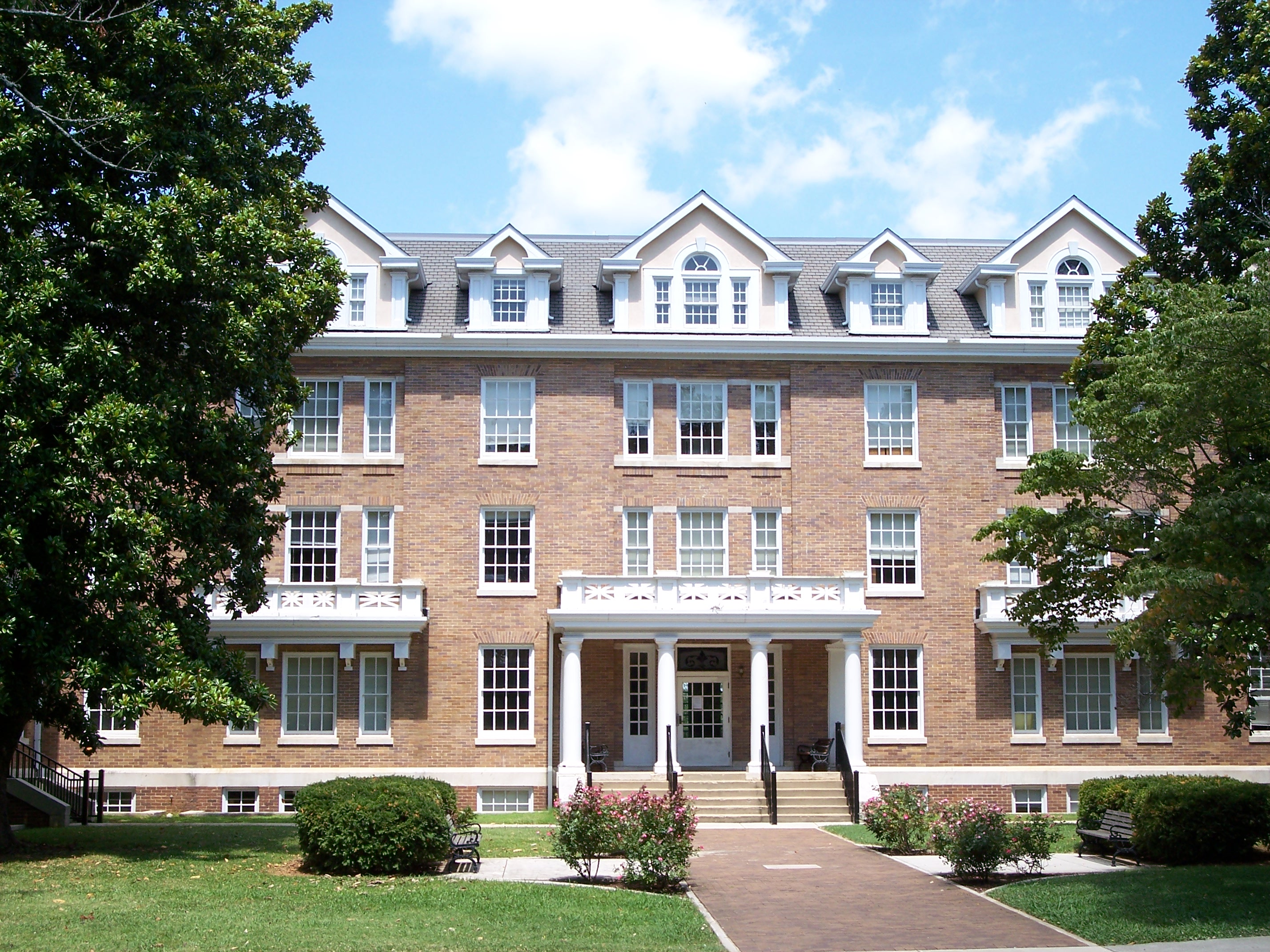
Carnegie Hall, built in 1910

- Gamble Hall: Co-ed; typically first-year housing. Rooms are available as both doubles and singles. Also features communal bathrooms.
- Davis Hall: Co-ed; typically first-year housing. Rooms are available as both doubles and singles. Also features communal bathrooms.
- Copeland Hall: Co-ed; typically first-year housing. Rooms are available as both doubles and singles. Also features communal bathrooms.
- Pearsons Hall: renovated for residential use on the second level in 2015.
- Lloyd Hall: Lloyd Hall offers suite-style living primarily to upperclassmen. These rooms are composed of a living room, two bathrooms, and either two doubles or a double and two singles. Some rooms also contain kitchens.
- Carnegie Hall: Carnegie hall offers suite-style rooms primarily for upperclassmen. Most rooms are quad-suite in which two double rooms share a kitchen and bathroom. Carnegie hall also offers single rooms in which a bathroom is shared by three residents.
- Beeson Village: Beeson Village offers apartment style living for primarily upperclassmen and is one of the newer campus living accommodations.
- Gibson Hall: Gibson Hall offers suite-style living primarily to upperclassmen. The newest residence hall at Maryville College, which offers suite style living almost identical to that of Lloyd Hall. Gibson Hall is a "wellness hall", which means that students must refrain from drinking, smoking, and drug use within the building.

All residence halls besides Copeland, Davis, Gamble, Gibson, and Pearsons allow alcohol to those of age.

=== Campus improvement plan ===
In 2010 Maryville College finished the construction of the Clayton Center for the Arts. This new CCA building is home to a large theatre, a flex theatre, and also classrooms and offices for professors of Maryville College. There are also plans to renovate Anderson Hall beginning June 2013. The renovations will focus on the interior and are estimated to be completed by August 2014.

=== Features of the college ===
The college's heating system started as an experiment by the Tennessee Valley Authority, the Department of Energy and the college in 1982. Coinciding with the World's Fair in Knoxville, the experiment tested the efficiency of burning wood waste as an energy source. Tours of the plant and demonstrations were held at the college.

The college's oldest building, Anderson Hall, built in 1870, is currently used as a classroom building. It is listed on the National Register of Historic Places.

Crawford House is an LEED Gold certified building, and it is the oldest of 5 existing buildings to be made so in Tennessee.

== Athletics ==
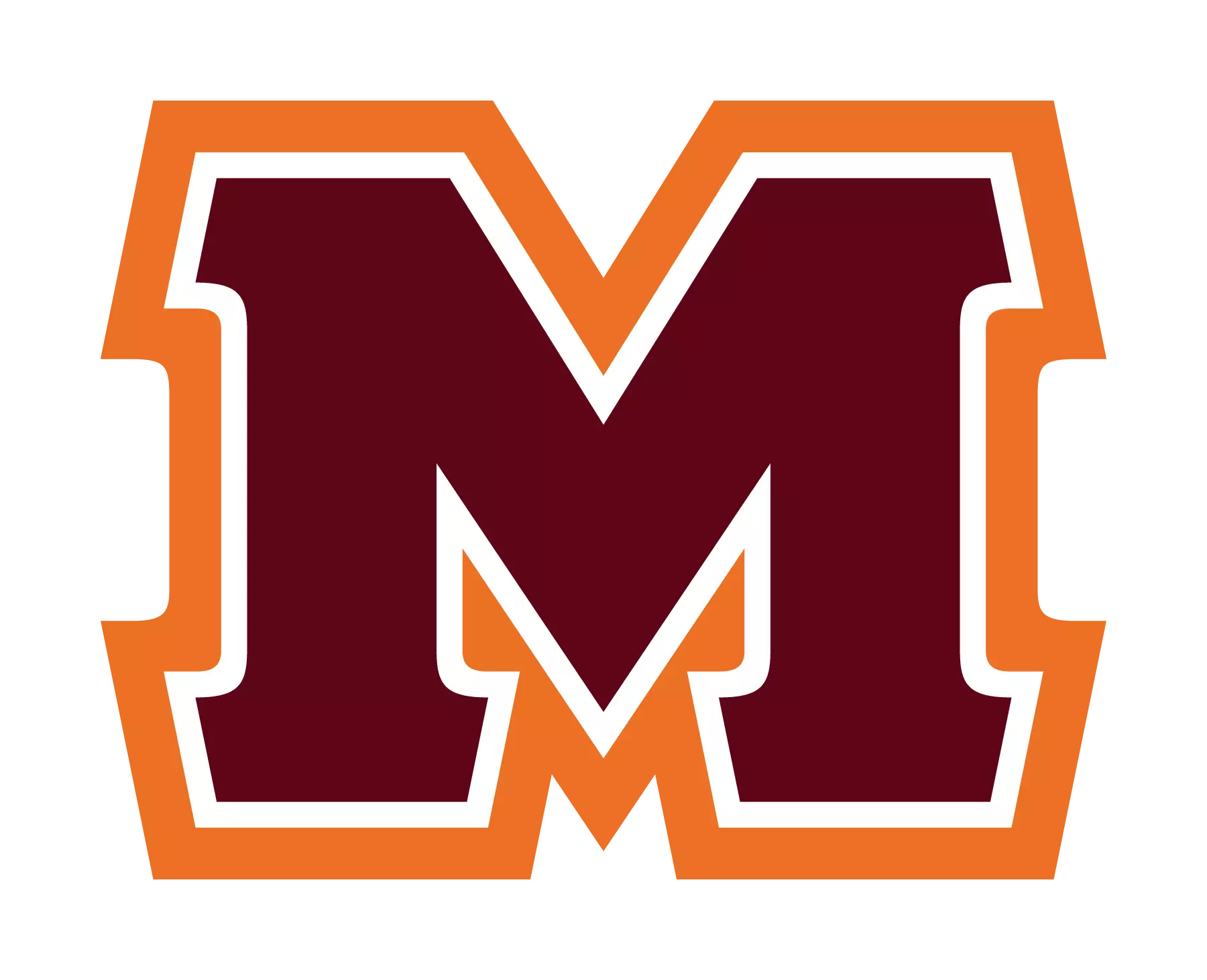
Maryville Scots logo

Maryville College sponsors 17 varsity sports under the guidelines of NCAA Division III. They are a founding member of the Collegiate Conference of the South (CCS) after they split with Maryville's former conference USA South. They are affiliate members in Southern Athletic Association for Football and Women's Golf.

Maryville plans to move to Southern Athletic Association in the 2026–27 academic year as a full member.

Men's sports	Women's sports
Baseball	Basketball
Basketball	Cross country
Cross country	Golf
Football	Soccer
Golf	Softball
Soccer	Stunt
Tennis	Tennis
Track and field^{1}	Track and field^{1}
	Volleyball
^{1} – includes both indoor and outdoor.

Maryville also sponsors a varsity women's equestrian team; while that sport is recognized by the NCAA as part of its Emerging Sports for Women program, Division III has yet to incorporate equestrian into the Emerging Sports program. Finally, Maryville lists its female cheerleaders (but not its male cheerleaders) and all-female dance team as varsity teams on its athletic website.

=== Football ===
The Maryville Scots football team was the second sponsored sport at Maryville, started in 1889 by Maryville Scots Athletics Hall of Fame member, Kin Takahashi, who served as team captain, quarterback, and head coach from 1892 to 1897.

In football, Maryville played in the 1947 Tangerine Bowl – the inaugural playing of what is now the Citrus Bowl – losing 31–6 to Catawba College.

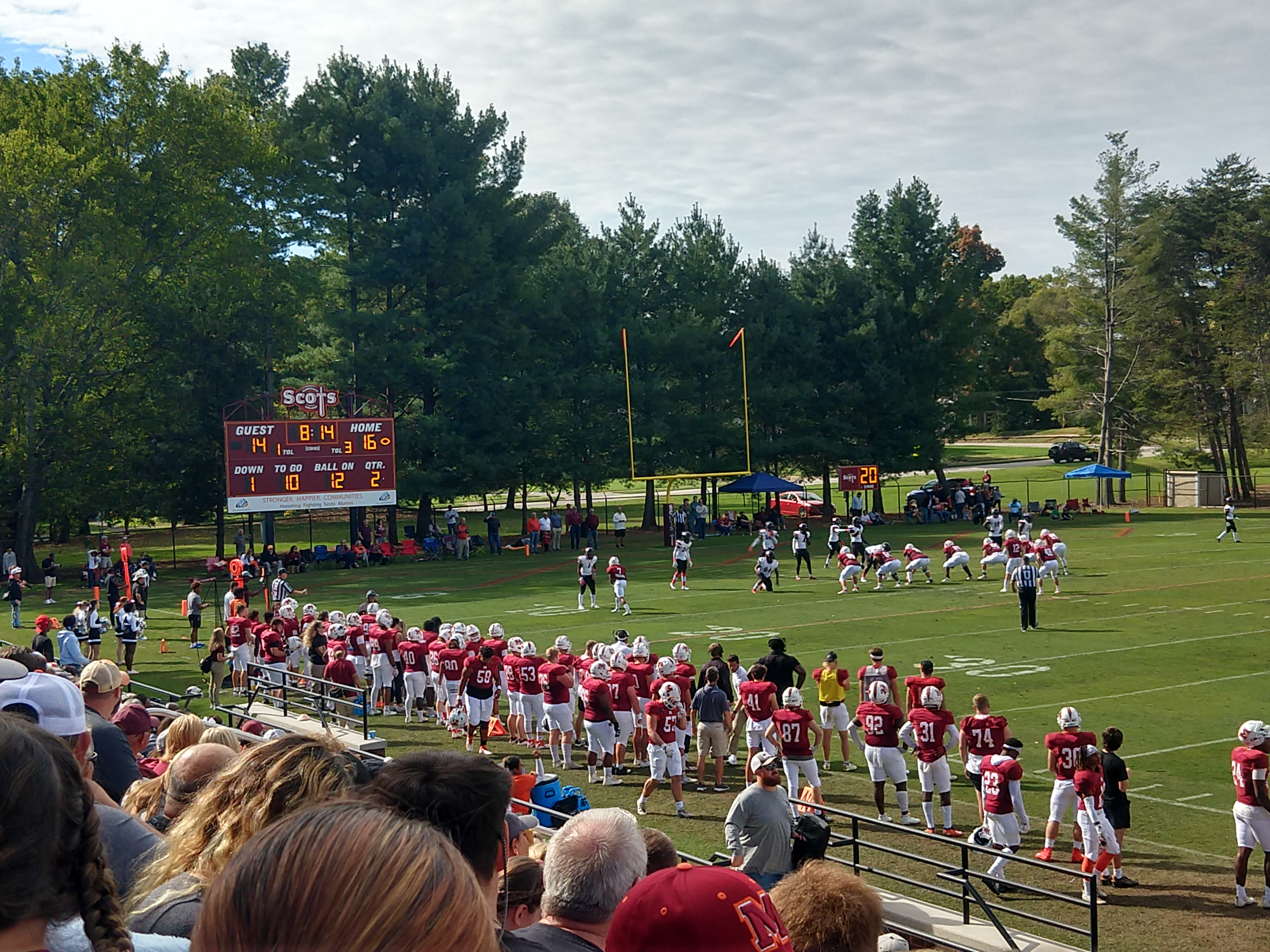
Maryville Scots football lines up for a play versus LaGrange during the 2021 season

== Weekend programs ==
The East Tennessee Japanese School (イーストテネシー補習授業校 Īsuto Teneshī Hoshū Jugyō Kō), a weekend Japanese education program, holds its classes at the college. It opened in August 1989, as the Blount County (ブラントカウンティ) Japanese School. In 1990 the school used Maryville students as volunteer instructors; according to Kumiko Franklin, the principal, there were 40 such volunteers applying for four positions.

== Notable alumni ==
- Otto Pflanze, an American historian best known for his three-volume biography of German statesman, Otto von Bismarck.
- Frank Moore Cross, a Professor Emeritus of the Harvard Divinity School, notable for both his work in the interpretation of the Dead Sea Scrolls as well as his analysis of the Deuteronomistic History (DH).
- Edwin Cunningham, United States Consul General in Shanghai (1920–1935)
- Keith Gordon Ham (later known as Kirtanananda Swami Bhaktipada), a prominent Hare Krishna ISKCON guru who oversaw the construction of the Palace of Gold in West Virginia. He was later incarcerated in prison for eight years for mail fraud.
- Donald West Harward, 6th President of Bates College.
- Maud Callaway Hays, President National of the U.S. Daughters of 1812
- Dorothy Andrews Elston Kabis, The 33rd Treasurer of the United States (1969–1971), appointed by President Richard Nixon.
- Sen Katayama, co-founder of Japanese Communist Party
- Roy Kramer, former Commissioner of the Southeastern Conference.
- Katherine O. Musgrave (1920–2015), professor emerita of food and nutrition, University of Maine
- Wiley Blount Rutledge (did not graduate; transferred elsewhere), Associate Justice of United States Supreme Court from 1943 to 1949.
- Tom Saffell, Major League Baseball player from 1949 to 1959.
- Richard B. Sellars (1915–2010), Chairman and CEO of Johnson & Johnson.
- Kirtanananda Swami, prominent guru in the Hare Krishna movement
- Roy Arthur Taylor, U.S. Representative from North Carolina, 1960–1977
- Kin Takahashi (1866/67-1902), football player and missionary who fundraised and built the third YMCA in the South on the Maryville campus.
- George Verwer, Evangelist and founder of Operation Mobilisation
- Ron Wolf, former General Manager of the NFL's Green Bay Packers
