= 2019 Stagg Bowl =

- Stagg Bowl XLVII
Wisconsin–Whitewater Warhawks	North Central Cardinals
(13–1)	(13–1)
WIAC	CCIW
14	41
Head coach: Kevin Bullis	Head coach: Jeff Thorne
	1	2	3	4	Total
Wisconsin–Whitewater	0	0	7	7	14
North Central	13	14	7	7	41
- Date: December 20, 2019
- Season: 2019
- Stadium: Woodforest Bank Stadium
- Location: Shenandoah, Texas
- Referee: Joe Horn
- Attendance: 1,362

United States TV coverage
- Network: ESPNU

The 2019 NCAA Division III Football Championship Game, more commonly referred to as the 2019 Stagg Bowl or Stagg Bowl XLVII, was a postseason college football game that determined a national champion in NCAA Division III for the 2019 season. It was played at Woodforest Bank Stadium in Shenandoah, Texas, on December 20, 2019, with kickoff at 8:00 p.m. EST (7:00 p.m. local CST), and television coverage on ESPNU.

== Teams ==
The participants of the 2019 NCAA Division III Football Championship Game were the finalists of the 2019 Division III Playoffs, a 32-team single-elimination bracket. The game featured North Central, seeking their first championship in their first appearance, and Wisconsin–Whitewater, seeking their seventh championship in their tenth appearance. This was the third meeting between the teams; Wisconsin–Whitewater led the series 2–0 entering the contest.

=== National semifinals ===
Semifinals; December 14; Hosted by team with asterisk
*	Wisconsin–Whitewater	35
Saint John's	32
*	Muhlenberg	14
North Central	45

National Championship; December 20; Woodforest Bank Stadium, Shenandoah, TX
Wisconsin–Whitewater	14
North Central	41

== Game summary ==
2019 Stagg Bowl

Quarter	1	2	3	4	Total
Wisconsin–Whitewater	0	0	7	7	14
North Central	13	14	7	7	41

at Woodforest Bank Stadium • Shenandoah, Texas

- Date: Friday, December 20, 2019
- Game time: 8:00 p.m. EST (7:00 p.m. CST)
- Game weather: Cloudy • Temperature: 49 °F (9 °C) • Wind: NE 5 mph
- Game attendance: 1,362
- Referee: Joe Horn
- TV announcers (ESPNU): Mark Neely (play-by-play), Ray Bentley (analyst)

Game information

First Quarter

- (12:27) NCC – Ethan Greenfield 5 yard rush, 2-point rush failed (Drive: 7 plays, 45 yards, 2:24; North Central 6–0)
- (0:35) NCC – Broc Rutter 31 yard pass to Blake Williams, Magnus Meyer kick (Drive: 4 plays, 72 yards, 1:41; North Central 13–0)

Second Quarter

- (10:12) NCC – Broc Rutter 1 yard rush, Magnus Meyer kick (Drive: 9 plays, 46 yards, 3:49; North Central 20–0)
- (1:49) NCC – Ethan Greenfield 2 yard rush, Magnus Meyer kick (Drive: 13 plays, 74 yards, 5:59; North Central 27–0)

Third Quarter

- (7:30) NCC – Ethan Greenfield 38 yard rush, Magnus Meyer kick (Drive: 9 plays, 80 yards, 4:35; North Central 34–0)
- (4:52) UWW – Max Meylor 12 yard pass to Jared Zausch, Wojciech Gasienica kick (Drive: 5 plays, 21 yards, 2:26; North Central 34–7)

Fourth Quarter

- (9:32) UWW – Alex Peete 1 yard rush, Wojciech Gasienica kick (Drive: 15 plays, 92 yards, 7:19; North Central 34–14)
- (1:58) NCC – Broc Rutter 28 yard pass to Andrew Kamienski, Magnus Meyer kick (Drive: 4 plays, 35 yards, 1:43; North Central 41–14)

=== Statistics ===
Statistics	UWW	NCC
First downs	19	22
Plays–yards	84–390	65–436
Rushes–yards	41–207	38–173
Passing yards	183	263
Passing: Comp–Att–Int	25–43–2	18–27–0
Time of possession	29:50	30:10

Team	Category	Player	Statistics
Wisconsin–Whitewater	Passing	Max Meylor	25/42, 183 yards, 1 TD, 2 INT
Wisconsin–Whitewater	Rushing	Max Meylor	15 carries, 104 yards
Wisconsin–Whitewater	Receiving	Tyler Holte	6 receptions, 64 yards
North Central	Passing	Broc Rutter	18/27, 263 yards, 2 TD
North Central	Rushing	Ethan Greenfield	27 carries, 138 yards, 3 TD
North Central	Receiving	Andrew Kamienski	9 receptions, 134 yards, 1 TD
