= 2019 North Central Cardinals football team =

American college football season

2019 North Central Cardinals football

NCAA Division III champion

Stagg Bowl, W 41–14 vs. Wisconsin–Whitewater
- Conference: College Conference of Illinois and Wisconsin

Ranking
- AFCA: No. 1
- D3Football.com: No. 1
- Record: 14–1 (8–1 CCIW)
- Head coach: Jeff Thorne (5th season)
- Offensive coordinator: Brad Spencer (5th season)
- Offensive scheme: West Coast spread
- Defensive coordinator: Shane Dierking (2nd season)
- Base defense: 4–3
- Home stadium: Benedetti–Wehrli Stadium

2019 College Conference of Illinois and Wisconsin football standings
	Conf.			Overall
Team	W		L	W		L
No. 5 Wheaton (IL) $^	9	–	0	12	–	1
No. 1 North Central (IL) ^	8	–	1	14	–	1
Washington University	6	–	3	7	–	3
Illinois Wesleyan	6	–	3	6	–	4
Augustana (IL)	5	–	4	6	–	4
Millikin	4	–	5	5	–	5
Carthage	4	–	5	4	–	6
Carroll (WI)	1	–	8	2	–	8
Elmhurst	1	–	8	1	–	9
North Park	1	–	8	1	–	9
$ – Conference champion; ^ – NCAA Division III playoff participant; Rankings from D3football.com

The 2019 North Central Cardinals football team was an American football team that represented North Central College in the College Conference of Illinois and Wisconsin (CCIW) during the 2019 NCAA Division III football season. The team played its home games at Benedetti–Wehrli Stadium in Naperville, Illinois.

In their fifth year under head coach Jeff Thorne, the team compiled a 14–1 record (8–1 against conference opponents) and finished second out of ten teams in the CCIW. The team advanced to the NCAA Division III playoffs and defeated Wisconsin–Whitewater, 41–14, in the 2019 Stagg Bowl.

Senior quarterback Broc Rutter won the Gagliardi Trophy, awarded to the best player in NCAA Division III. Rutter finished just three votes ahead of Jackson Erdmann, the closest vote in the history of the award.

== Preseason ==
The CCIW released it preseason coaches' prediction poll on August 8, 2019. The Cardinals were picked to win the conference and received seven of the ten first place votes.

== Schedule ==
Date	Time	Opponent	Rank	Site	Result	Attendance
September 7	11:00 a.m.	at Christopher Newport*	No. 5	TowneBank Stadium; Newport News, VA	W 43–13	3,678
September 21	5:00 p.m.	at No. 24 Washington (MO)	No. 5	Francis Field; St. Louis, MO	W 46–13	2,983
September 28	2:00 p.m.	North Park^{†}	No. 5	Benedetti–Wehrli Stadium; Naperville, IL	W 77–0	3,650
October 5	1:00 p.m.	at No. 9 Wheaton (IL)	No. 5	McCully Stadium; Wheaton, IL (Battle for the Little Brass Bell)	L 21–35	4,337
October 12	1:00 p.m.	Augustana (IL)	No. 9	Benedetti–Wehrli Stadium; Naperville, IL	W 42–14	4,500
October 19	1:00 p.m.	at Carroll (WI)	No. 8	Schneider Stadium; Waukesha, WI	W 62–3	1,732
October 26	12:00 p.m.	Carthage	No. 7	Benedetti–Wehrli Stadium; Naperville, IL	W 49–6	690
November 2	1:00 p.m.	at Elmhurst	No. 7	Langhorst Field; Elmhurst, IL	W 82–7	758
November 9	1:00 p.m.	Illinois Wesleyan	No. 6	Benedetti–Wehrli Stadium; Naperville, IL	W 69–14	3,000
November 16	1:00 p.m.	at Millikin	No. 6	Lindsay Field; Decatur, IL	W 59–32	1,200
November 23	12:00 p.m.	Wabash*	No. 5	Benedetti–Wehrli Stadium; Naperville, IL (NCAA Division III First Round)	W 51–15	1,014
November 30	11:00 a.m.	at No. 2 Mount Union*	No. 5	Mount Union Stadium; Alliance, OH (NCAA Division III Second Round)	W 59–52	3,227
December 7	12:00 p.m.	No. 9 Delaware Valley*	No. 5	Benedetti–Wehrli Stadium; Naperville, IL (NCAA Division III Quarterfinal)	W 31–14	1,351
December 14	11:00 a.m.	at No. 4 Muhlenberg*	No. 5	Scotty Wood Stadium; Allentown, PA (NCAA Division III Semifinal)	W 45–14	3,845
December 20	7:00 p.m.	vs. No. 7 Wisconsin–Whitewater*	No. 5	Woodforest Bank Stadium; Shenandoah, TX (Stagg Bowl)	W 41–14	1,362
*Non-conference game; ^{†}Homecoming; Rankings from D3Football.com Poll released prior to the game; All times are in Central time

== Rankings ==
Ranking movements Legend: ██ Increase in ranking ██ Decrease in ranking ( ) = First-place votes
	Week												
Poll	Pre	1	2	3	4	5	6	7	8	9	10	11	Final
D3 Football	5	5	5	5	5	9	8	7	7	6	6	5	1 (25)
AFCA	Not released			5	5	12	10	8	8	6	6	5	1 (53)

== Game summaries ==
=== At Christopher Newport ===
No. 5 North Central Cardinals at Christopher Newport Captains – Game summary

Quarter	1	2	3	4	Total
No. 5 Cardinals	21	6	10	6	43
Captains	7	3	0	3	13

at TowneBank Stadium, Newport News, Virginia

- Date: September 7
- Game time: 11:00 a.m. CDT/12:00 p.m. EDT
- Game weather: Sunny and clear, 79 °F (26 °C)
- Game attendance: 3,678
- Referee: Travis Barta
- Box score, Recap

Game information
First quarter
- NCC – Ethan Greenfield 1-yard run (Magnus Meyer kick), 10:42. Cardinals 7–0. Drive: 8 plays, 77 yards, 4:18.
- CNU – Garrison Mayo 78-yard pass from Jack Anderson (Dylan Curran kick), 10:02. Tied 7–7. Drive: 2 plays, 82 yards, 0:34.
- NCC – Terrence Hill 9-yard pass from Broc Rutter (Magnus Meyer kick), 7:01. Cardinals 14–7. Drive: 7 plays, 75 yards, 3:01.
- NCC – Dakota Creemons 0-yard fumble return (Magnus Meyer kick), 4:53. Cardinals 21–7.

Second quarter

- NCC – Blake Williams 48-yard pass from Broc Rutter (kick failed), 14:51. Cardinals 27–7. Drive: 6 plays, 53 yards, 2:49.
- CNU – Dylan Curran 48-yard field goal, 4:55. Cardinals 27–10. Drive: 9 plays, 44 yards, 3:33.

Third quarter

- NCC – Tyler Egan 31-yard pass from Broc Rutter (Magnus Meyer kick), 9:33. Cardinals 34–10. Drive: 7 plays, 50 yards, 3:48.
- NCC – Magnus Meyer 23-yard field goal, 0:49. Cardinals 37–10. Drive: 14 plays, 42 yards, 6:29.

Fourth quarter

- CNU – Dylan Curran 41-yard field goal, 12:25. Cardinals 37–13. Drive: 7 plays, 51 yards, 3:24.
- NCC – Broc Rutter 8-yard run (kick failed), 7:09. Cardinals 43–13. Drive: 9 plays, 85 yards, 5:13.

Statistics	NCC	CNU
First downs	27	13
Total yards	508	212
Rushing yards	139	10
Passing yards	369	202
Turnovers	0	3
Time of possession	35:47	24:13

Team	Category	Player	Statistics
North Central	Passing	Broc Rutter	27/36, 369 yards, 3 TD
North Central	Rushing	Ethan Greenfield	13 rushes, 97 yards, TD
North Central	Receiving	Andrew Kamienski	9 receptions, 103 yards
Christopher Newport	Passing	Jack Anderson	17/27, 202 yards, TD, 2 INT
Christopher Newport	Rushing	Adam Luncher	3 rushes, 24 yards
Christopher Newport	Receiving	Garrison Mayo	3 receptions, 95 yards, TD

=== At No. 24 Washington (MO) ===
No. 5 North Central Cardinals at No. 24 Washington Bears – Game summary

Quarter	1	2	3	4	Total
No. 5 Cardinals	13	14	12	7	46
No. 24 Bears	13	0	0	0	13

at Francis Olympic Field, St. Louis, Missouri

- Date: September 21
- Game time: 5:00 p.m. CDT
- Game weather: Mostly cloudy, 85 °F (29 °C)
- Game attendance: 2,983
- Referee: Mike Goldstein
- Box score, Recap

Game information
First quarter
- NCC – Terrence Hill 10-yard pass from Broc Rutter (kick failed), 13:03. Cardinals 6–0. Drive: 6 plays, 75 yards, 1:57.
- NCC – DeAngelo Hardy 3-yard pass from Broc Rutter (Milan Dezelich kick), 8:28. Cardinals 13–0. Drive: 8 plays, 70 yards, 3:35.
- WASHU – Johnny Davidson 1-yard run (Chris Vartanian kick), 4:41. Cardinals 13–7. Drive: 12 plays, 65 yards, 3:47.
- WASHU – Anthony Brown 71-yard blocked field goal return (kick blocked), 0:00. Tied 13–13.

Second quarter

- NCC – DeAngelo Hardy 11-yard pass from Broc Rutter (Milan Dezelich kick), 11:24. Cardinals 20–13. Drive: 9 plays, 75 yards, 3:36.
- NCC – Andrew Kamienski 10-yard pass from Broc Rutter (Milan Dezelich kick), 0:15. Cardinals 27–13. Drive: 10 plays, 69 yards, 1:14.

Third quarter

- NCC – Johnny Davidson blocked punt recovered in own end zone, 13:23. Cardinals 29–13.
- NCC – Terrence Hill 9-yard run (Milan Dezelich kick), 11:43. Cardinals 36–13. Drive: 6 plays, 53 yards, 1:34.
- NCC – Milan Dezelich 27-yard field goal, 4:08. Cardinals 39–13. Drive: 10 plays, 90 yards, 3:50.

Fourth quarter

- NCC – Andrew Kamienski 6-yard pass from Broc Rutter (Milan Dezelich kick), 8:55. Cardinals 46–13. Drive: 10 plays, 67 yards, 3:56.

Statistics	NCC	WASHU
First downs	33	18
Total yards	640	311
Rushing yards	242	60
Passing yards	398	251
Turnovers	2	1
Time of possession	34:47	25:13

Team	Category	Player	Statistics
North Central	Passing	Broc Rutter	34/45, 398 yards, 5 TD, INT
North Central	Rushing	Ethan Greenfield	13 rushes, 118 yards
North Central	Receiving	Andrew Kamienski	15 receptions, 181 yards, 2 TD
Washington (MO)	Passing	Johnny Davidson	24/42, 226 yards, INT
Washington (MO)	Rushing	John Fisher	10 rushes, 35 yards
Washington (MO)	Receiving	Tim Matthiessen	7 receptions, 52 yards

=== North Park ===
North Park Vikings at No. 5 North Central Cardinals – Game summary

Quarter	1	2	3	4	Total
Vikings	0	0	0	0	0
No. 5 Cardinals	21	35	14	7	77

at Benedetti–Wehrli Stadium, Naperville, Illinois

- Date: September 28
- Game time: 2:00 p.m. CDT
- Game weather: Overcast, 65 °F (18 °C)
- Game attendance: 3,650
- Referee: Paul Keating
- Box score, Recap

Game information
First quarter
- NCC – Andrew Kamienski 60-yard pass from Broc Rutter (Milan Dezelich kick), 14:40. Cardinals 7–0. Drive: 1 play, 60 yards, 0:20.
- NCC – Ethan Greenfield 9-yard run (Milan Dezelich kick), 6:47. Cardinals 14–0. Drive: 8 plays, 71 yards, 3:49.
- NCC – Andrew Kamienski 33-yard pass from Broc Rutter (Milan Dezelich kick), 2:47. Cardinals 21–0. Drive: 7 plays, 63 yards, 1:48.

Second quarter

- NCC – DeAngelo Hardy 43-yard run (Milan Dezelich kick), 11:34. Cardinals 28–0. Drive: 2 plays, 47 yards, 0:34.
- NCC – Blake Williams 34-yard pass from Broc Rutter (Milan Dezelich kick), 9:10. Cardinals 35–0. Drive: 4 plays, 41 yards, 1:47.
- NCC – Zach Garrett 42-yard run (Milan Dezelich kick), 9:10. Cardinals 42–0. Drive: 1 plays, 42 yards, 0:09.
- NCC – Khori Blair 79-yard pass from Broc Rutter (Milan Dezelich kick), 4:47. Cardinals 49–0. Drive: 2 plays, 83 yards, 0:50.
- NCC – Zach Garrett 13-yard run (Milan Dezelich kick), 1:13. Cardinals 56–0. Drive: 6 plays, 70 yards, 1:58.

Third quarter

- NCC – Nic Rummell 9-yard pass from Jake Johnson (Milan Dezelich kick), 10:07. Cardinals 63–0. Drive: 6 plays, 58 yards, 3:17.
- NCC – Tommy Coates 10-yard pass from Jake Johnson (Magnus Meyer kick), 0:12. Cardinals 70–0. Drive: 3 plays, 36 yards, 1:21.

Fourth quarter

- NCC – Jake Johnson 1-yard run (Magnus Meyer kick), 9:54. Cardinals 77–0. Drive: 6 plays, 59 yards, 2:59.

Statistics	NPU	NCC
First downs	8	24
Total yards	117	685
Rushing yards	22	306
Passing yards	95	379
Turnovers	1	0
Time of possession	32:26	27:34

Team	Category	Player	Statistics
North Park	Passing	Grant Borsch	14/29, 87 yards, INT
North Park	Rushing	A. J. Harris	13 rushes, 17 yards
North Park	Receiving	Malik Powell	4 receptions, 38 yards
North Central	Passing	Broc Rutter	16/17, 334 yards, 4 TD
North Central	Rushing	Rafael Rios	11 rushes, 98 yards
North Central	Receiving	Andrew Kamienski	4 receptions, 137 yards, 2 TD

=== At No. 9 Wheaton (IL) ===
No. 5 North Central Cardinals at No. 9 Wheaton Thunder – Game summary

Quarter	1	2	3	4	Total
No. 5 Cardinals	7	7	7	0	21
No. 9 Thunder	0	7	14	14	35

at McCully Stadium, Wheaton, Illinois

- Date: October 5
- Game time: 5:00 p.m. CDT
- Game weather: Mostly cloudy, 63 °F (17 °C)
- Game attendance: 2,983
- Referee: Jeremy Mancilla
- Box score, Recap

Game information
First quarter
- NCC – Ethan Greenfield 1-yard run (Milan Dezelich kick), 10:14. Cardinals 7–0. Drive: 11 plays, 89 yards, 4:46.

Second quarter

- WHEAT – T. J. Williams 3-yard pass from Luke Anthony (Griffin Bowes kick), 12:13. Tied 7–7. Drive: 13 plays, 80 yards, 4:55.
- NCC – Blake Williams 48-yard pass from Broc Rutter (Milan Dezelich kick), 6:18. Cardinals 14–7. Drive: 2 plays, 55 yards, 0:42.

Third quarter

- WHEAT – Phillip Nichols 47-yard pass from Luke Anthony (Griffin Bowes kick), 7:53. Tied 14–14. Drive: 4 plays, 56 yards, 1:46.
- NCC – Andrew Kamienski 9-yard pass from Broc Rutter (Milan Dezelich kick), 4:47. Cardinals 21–14. Drive: 8 plays, 75 yards, 3:06.
- WHEAT – Phillip Nichols 5-yard pass from Luke Anthony (Griffin Bowes kick), 1:32. Tied 21–21. Drive: 7 plays, 72 yards, 3:06.

Fourth quarter

- WHEAT – Phillip Nichols 58-yard pass from Luke Anthony (Griffin Bowes kick), 14:06. Thunder 28–21. Drive: 1 play, 58 yards, 0:11.
- WHEAT – Adam Terrini 21-yard pass from Luke Anthony (Griffin Bowes kick), 6:40. Thunder 35–21. Drive: 6 plays, 46 yards, 3:31.

Statistics	NCC	WHEAT
First downs	22	20
Total yards	398	447
Rushing yards	85	96
Passing yards	313	351
Turnovers	1	0
Time of possession	30:57	29:03

Team	Category	Player	Statistics
North Central	Passing	Broc Rutter	27/45, 313 yards, 2 TD
North Central	Rushing	Ethan Greenfield	29 rushes, 111 yards, TD
North Central	Receiving	Blake Williams	6 receptions, 158 yards, TD
Wheaton	Passing	Luke Anthony	21/30, 351 yards, 5 TD
Wheaton	Rushing	T. J. Williams	23 rushes, 94 yards
Wheaton	Receiving	Phillip Nichols	10 receptions, 207 yards, 3 TD

=== Augustana (IL) ===
Augustana Vikings at No. 9 North Central Cardinals – Game summary

Quarter	1	2	3	4	Total
Vikings	7	0	0	7	14
No. 9 Cardinals	14	21	7	0	42

at Benedetti–Wehrli Stadium, Naperville, Illinois

- Date: October 12
- Game time: 1:00 p.m. CDT
- Game weather: Mostly sunny, 48 °F (9 °C)
- Game attendance: 4,500
- Referee: Mike Cunningham
- Box score, Recap

Game information
First quarter
- NCC – Ethan Greenfield 2-yard run (Milan Dezelich kick), 12:37. Cardinals 7–0. Drive: 8 plays, 81 yards, 2:23.
- NCC – Andrew Kamienski 30-yard pass from Broc Rutter (Milan Dezelich kick), 6:51. Cardinals 14–0. Drive: 9 plays, 65 yards, 4:04.
- AUGIE – Tom Dolis 39-yard pass from Zachary Fuller (Owen Ennis kick), 0:57. Cardinals 14–7. Drive: 2 plays, 42 yards, 0:43.

Second quarter

- NCC – Ethan Greenfield 2-yard run (Milan Dezelich kick), 11:05. Cardinals 21–7. Drive: 1 play, 2 yards, 0:07.
- NCC – Andrew Kamienski 32-yard pass from Broc Rutter (Milan Dezelich kick), 7:02. Cardinals 28–7. Drive: 6 plays, 82 yards, 2:15.
- NCC – Andrew Kamienski 6-yard pass from Broc Rutter (Milan Dezelich kick), 3:09. Cardinals 35–7. Drive: 7 plays, 41 yards, 2:34.

Third quarter

- NCC – Ethan Greenfield 3-yard run (Milan Dezelich kick), 3:52. Cardinals 42–7. Drive: 12 plays, 90 yards, 5:12.

Fourth quarter

- AUGIE – Alek Jacobs 15-yard run (Owen Ennis kick), 4:18. Cardinals 42–14. Drive: 6 plays, 53 yards, 2:58.

Statistics	AUGIE	NCC
First downs	14	24
Total yards	297	443
Rushing yards	160	145
Passing yards	137	298
Turnovers	3	2
Time of possession	26:27	33:33

Team	Category	Player	Statistics
Augustana (IL)	Passing	Zachary Fuller	7/19, 89 yards, TD
Augustana (IL)	Rushing	Bobby Jarosz	19 rushes, 67 yards
Augustana (IL)	Receiving	Tom Dolis	2 receptions, 55 yards, TD
North Central	Passing	Broc Rutter	25/37, 291 yards, 3 TD, INT
North Central	Rushing	Ethan Greenfield	27 rushes, 138 yards, 3 TD
North Central	Receiving	Andrew Kamienski	11 receptions, 135 yards, 3 TD

=== At Carroll (WI) ===
No. 8 North Central Cardinals at Carroll Pioneers – Game summary

Quarter	1	2	3	4	Total
No. 8 Cardinals	13	21	14	14	62
Pioneers	3	0	0	0	3

at Schneider Stadium, Waukesha, Wisconsin

- Date: October 19
- Game time: 1:00 p.m. CDT
- Game weather: Partly cloudy, 58 °F (14 °C)
- Game attendance: 1,732
- Referee: Benjamin Ligocki
- Box score, Recap

Statistics	NCC	CUWI
First downs	29	8
Total yards	602	214
Rushing yards	307	18
Passing yards	295	196
Turnovers	0	1
Time of possession	25:19	34:41

Team	Category	Player	Statistics
North Central	Passing	Broc Rutter	14/22, 256 yards, 4 TD
North Central	Rushing	Ethan Greenfield	9 rushes, 137 yards, 2 TD
North Central	Receiving	Andrew Kamienski	8 receptions, 167 yards, 3 TD
Carroll	Passing	Michael Johnson	15/24, 196 yards, INT
Carroll	Rushing	Michael Johnson	7 rushes, 17 yards
Carroll	Receiving	David Meza	6 receptions, 102 yards

=== Carthage ===
Carthage Red Men at No. 7 North Central Cardinals – Game summary

Quarter	1	2	3	4	Total
Red Men	0	0	0	6	6
No. 7 Cardinals	21	28	0	0	49

at Benedetti–Wehrli Stadium, Naperville, Illinois

- Date: October 26
- Game time: 12:00 p.m. CDT
- Game weather: Partly cloudy, 56 °F (13 °C)
- Game attendance: 690
- Referee: Jeremy Mancilla
- Box score, Recap

Statistics	CAR	NCC
First downs	15	29
Total yards	172	614
Rushing yards	114	306
Passing yards	58	308
Turnovers	1	3
Time of possession	31:55	28:05

Team	Category	Player	Statistics
Carthage	Passing	Billy Dury	5/17, 49 yards
Carthage	Rushing	Dana Fontenot	18 rushes, 39 yards
Carthage	Receiving	Jovone Stricker	3 receptions, 32 yards
North Central	Passing	Broc Rutter	18/22, 308 yards, 5 TD
North Central	Rushing	Ethan Greenfield	13 rushes, 208 yards, 2 TD
North Central	Receiving	Blake Williams	7 receptions, 129 yards, TD

=== At Elmhurst ===
No. 7 North Central Cardinals at Elmhurst Bluejays – Game summary

Quarter	1	2	3	4	Total
No. 7 Cardinals	20	34	14	14	82
Bluejays	0	0	7	0	7

at Langhorst Field, Elmhurst, Illinois

- Date: November 2
- Game time: 1:00 p.m. CDT
- Game weather: Partly sunny, 40 °F (4 °C)
- Game attendance: 758
- Referee: Ben Kuhr
- Box score, Recap

Statistics	NCC	ELM
First downs	28	9
Total yards	678	136
Rushing yards	296	74
Passing yards	382	62
Turnovers	0	3
Time of possession	30:48	29:12

Team	Category	Player	Statistics
North Central	Passing	Broc Rutter	23/28, 277 yards, 6 TD
North Central	Rushing	Ethan Greenfield	17 rushes, 182 yards, 2 TD
North Central	Receiving	Jarrett Crider	2 receptions, 77 yards, TD
Elmhurst	Passing	Jake Tahaney	9/23, 57 yards, TD, INT
Elmhurst	Rushing	Jake Tahaney	5 rushes, 49 yards
Elmhurst	Receiving	Ben Fridrich	4 receptions, 35 yards, TD

=== Illinois Wesleyan ===
Illinois Wesleyan Titans at No. 6 North Central Cardinals – Game summary

Quarter	1	2	3	4	Total
Titans	0	14	0	0	14
No. 6 Cardinals	17	28	14	10	69

at Benedetti–Wehrli Stadium, Naperville, Illinois

- Date: November 9
- Game time: 1:00 p.m. CST
- Game weather: Partly cloudy, 46 °F (8 °C)
- Game attendance: 3,000
- Referee: Tim Kiefer
- Box score, Recap

Statistics	IWU	NCC
First downs	12	21
Total yards	227	622
Rushing yards	49	306
Passing yards	178	316
Turnovers	3	0
Time of possession	30:54	29:06

Team	Category	Player	Statistics
Illinois Wesleyan	Passing	Johnny Dicanio	14/32, 178 yards, TD, INT
Illinois Wesleyan	Rushing	Johnny Dicanio	11 rushes, 30 yards
Illinois Wesleyan	Receiving	Wesley Watson	4 receptions, 97 yards
North Central	Passing	Broc Rutter	12/19, 281 yards, 6 TD
North Central	Rushing	Ethan Greenfield	15 rushes, 94 yards, 2 TD
North Central	Receiving	Andrew Kamienski	7 receptions, 155 yards, 4 TD

=== At Millikin ===
No. 6 North Central Cardinals at Millikin Big Blue – Game summary

Quarter	1	2	3	4	Total
No. 6 Cardinals	24	7	14	14	59
Big Blue	7	7	6	12	32

at Lindsay Field, Decatur, Illinois

- Date: November 16
- Game time: 1:00 p.m. CST
- Game weather: Clear, 41 °F (5 °C)
- Game attendance: 1,200
- Referee: Marcel Kerr
- Box score, Recap

Statistics	NCC	MILL
First downs	20	20
Total yards	506	324
Rushing yards	213	203
Passing yards	293	121
Turnovers	2	1
Time of possession	22:16	37:44

Team	Category	Player	Statistics
North Central	Passing	Broc Rutter	17/24, 293 yards, 3 TD
North Central	Rushing	Ethan Greenfield	14 rushes, 199 yards, 3 TD
North Central	Receiving	Andrew Kamienski	7 receptions, 182 yards, 2 TD
Millikin	Passing	Cal Pohrte	15/31, 121 yards, 3 TD
Millikin	Rushing	Richard Cosey	26 rushes, 152 yards, TD
Millikin	Receiving	Jordan Smith	6 receptions, 52 yards, TD

=== Wabash (NCAA Division III First Round) ===
2019 NCAA Division III Playoffs First Round
Wabash Little Giants at No. 5 North Central Cardinals – Game summary

Quarter	1	2	3	4	Total
Little Giants	9	3	3	0	15
No. 5 Cardinals	21	7	9	14	51

at Benedetti–Wehrli Stadium, Naperville, Illinois

- Date: November 23
- Game time: 12:00 p.m. CST
- Game weather: Overcast, 47 °F (8 °C)
- Game attendance: 1,014
- Referee: Mike Hoffman
- Box score, Recap

Game information
First quarter
- NCC – Ethan Greenfield 4-yard run (Magnus Meyer kick), 12:33. Cardinals 7–0. Drive: 6 plays, 76 yards, 2:27.
- WAB – Nick Hamman 38-yard pass from Liam Thompson (run failed), 8:40. Cardinals 7–6. Drive: 7 plays, 75 yards, 3:53.
- NCC – Ethan Greenfield 2-yard run (Magnus Meyer kick), 6:08. Cardinals 14–6. Drive: 6 plays, 68 yards, 2:26.
- WAB – Schuyler Nehrig 44-yard field goal, 2:19. Cardinals 14–9. Drive: 9 plays, 48 yards, 3:49.'
- NCC – Ethan Greenfield 6-yard run (Magnus Meyer kick), 0:51. Cardinals 21–9. Drive: 4 plays, 68 yards, 1:24.

Second quarter

- WAB – Schuyler Nehrig 41-yard field goal, 11:01. Cardinals 21–12. Drive: 10 plays, 51 yards, 4:50.
- NCC – Ethan Greenfield 4-yard run (Magnus Meyer kick), 7:54. Cardinals 28–12. Drive: 6 plays, 65 yards, 3:00.

Third quarter

- WAB – Schuyler Nehrig 28-yard field goal, 10:56. Cardinals 28–15. Drive: 12 plays, 64 yards, 4:04.
- NCC – Magnus Meyer 29-yard field goal, 6:05. Cardinals 31–15. Drive: 10 plays, 64 yards, 4:44.
- NCC – Ethan Greenfield 5-yard run (kick failed), 0:11. Cardinals 37–15. Drive: 9 plays, 82 yards, 2:53.

Fourth quarter

- NCC – Andrew Kamienski 30-yard pass from Broc Rutter (Magnus Meyer kick), 10:41. Cardinals 44–15. Drive: 7 plays, 77 yards, 3:03.
- NCC – Zach Garrett 20-yard run (Magnus Meyer kick), 6:59. Cardinals 51–15. Drive: 4 plays, 42 yards, 1:44.

Statistics	WAB	NCC
First downs	18	31
Total yards	352	588
Rushing yards	138	358
Passing yards	214	230
Turnovers	1	0
Time of possession	30:56	29:04

Team	Category	Player	Statistics
Wabash	Passing	Liam Thompson	14/29, 180 yards, TD, INT
Wabash	Rushing	Isaac Avant	16 rushes, 84 yards
Wabash	Receiving	Nick Hamman	5 receptions, 74 yards, TD
North Central	Passing	Broc Rutter	17/19, 230 yards, TD
North Central	Rushing	Ethan Greenfield	29 rushes, 301 yards, 5 TD
North Central	Receiving	Andrew Kamienski	9 receptions, 163 yards, TD

=== At No. 2 Mount Union (NCAA Division III Second Round) ===
2019 NCAA Division III Playoffs Second Round
No. 5 North Central Cardinals at No. 2 Mount Union Purple Raiders – Game summary

Quarter	1	2	3	4	Total
No. 5 Cardinals	7	21	21	10	59
No. 2 Purple Raiders	14	24	7	7	52

at Mount Union Stadium, Alliance, Ohio

- Date: November 30
- Game time: 11:00 a.m. CST/12:00 p.m. EST
- Game weather: Cloudy, 35 °F (2 °C)
- Game attendance: 3,227
- Referee: David Hergert
- Box score, Recap

Game information
First quarter
- MTU – D'Angelo Fulford 3-yard run (Max Righetti kick), 12:07. Purple Raiders 7–0. Drive: 7 plays, 85 yards, 2:53.
- NCC – Ethan Greenfield 11-yard run (Magnus Meyer kick), 8:12. Tied 7–7. Drive: 7 plays, 86 yards, 3:50.
- MTU – Josh Petruccelli 1-yard run (Max Righetti kick), 4:29. Purple Raiders 14–7. Drive: 8 plays, 80 yards, 3:35.

Second quarter

- NCC – Andrew Kamienski 11-yard pass from Broc Rutter (Magnus Meyer kick), 14:10. Tied 14–14. Drive: 11 plays, 78 yards, 5:14.
- MTU – Justin Hill 65-yard pass from D'Angelo Fulford (kick failed), 13:25. Purple Raiders 20–14. Drive: 2 plays, 65 yards, 0:45.
- NCC – Ethan Greenfield 24-yard pass from Broc Rutter (Magnus Meyer kick), 12:05. Cardinals 21–20. Drive: 3 plays, 63 yards, 1:16.
- NCC – Andrew Kamienski 41-yard pass from Broc Rutter (Magnus Meyer kick), 9:59. Cardinals 28–20. Drive: 4 plays, 45 yards, 1:33.
- MTU – Max Righetti 28-yard field goal, 7:40. Cardinals 28–23. Drive: 5 plays, 64 yards, 2:19.
- MTU – Edwin Reed 27-yard pass from D'Angelo Fulford (D'Angelo Fulford pass to Joe Fornaro), 4:01. Purple Raiders 31–28. Drive: 4 plays, 42 yards, 1:33.
- MTU – D'Angelo Fulford 2-yard run (Max Righetti kick), 0:15. Purple Raiders 38–28. Drive: 8 plays, 95 yards, 2:46.

Third quarter

- NCC – Andrew Kamienski 71-yard pass from Broc Rutter (Magnus Meyer kick), 13:26. Purple Raiders 38–35. Drive: 3 plays, 79 yards, 1:30.
- MTU – Wayne Ruby 66-yard pass from D'Angelo Fulford (Max Righetti kick), 12:51. Purple Raiders 45–35. Drive: 2 plays, 77 yards, 0:29.
- NCC – Ethan Greenfield 3-yard run (Magnus Meyer kick), 8:56. Purple Raiders 45–42. Drive: 9 plays, 89 yards, 3:45.
- NCC – Andrew Kamienski 6-yard pass from Broc Rutter (Magnus Meyer kick), 1:58. Cardinals 49–45. Drive: 10 plays, 60 yards, 5:22.

Fourth quarter

- NCC – Broc Rutter 10-yard run (Magnus Meyer kick), 14:16. Cardinals 56–45. Drive: 6 plays, 79 yards, 1:34.
- MTU – Josh Petrucelli 12-yard pass from D'Angelo Fulford (Max Righetti kick), 12:53. Cardinals 56–52. Drive: 3 plays, 41 yards, 1:15.
- NCC – Magnus Meyer 35-yard field goal, 8:00. Cardinals 59–52. Drive: 9 plays, 57 yards, 4:45.

Statistics	NCC	MTU
First downs	27	26
Total yards	699	698
Rushing yards	177	149
Passing yards	522	549
Turnovers	1	3
Time of possession	35:01	24:59

Team	Category	Player	Statistics
North Central	Passing	Brock Rutter	22/36, 522 yards, 5 TD, INT
North Central	Rushing	Ethan Greenfield	27 rushes, 130 yards, 2 TD
North Central	Receiving	Andrew Kamienski	12 receptions, 256 yards, 4 TD
Mount Union	Passing	D'Angelo Fulford	23/34, 549 yards, 4 TD, INT
Mount Union	Rushing	D'Angelo Fulford	21 rushes, 124 yards, 2 TD
Mount Union	Receiving	Justin Hill	7 receptions, 221 yards, TD

=== No. 9 Delaware Valley (NCAA Division III Quarterfinal) ===
2019 NCAA Division III Playoffs Quarterfinal
No. 9 Delaware Valley Aggies at No. 5 North Central Cardinals – Game summary

Quarter	1	2	3	4	Total
No. 9 Aggies	0	0	14	0	14
No. 5 Cardinals	14	3	7	7	31

at Benedetti–Wehrli Stadium, Naperville, Illinois

- Date: December 7
- Game time: 12:00 p.m. CST
- Game weather: Mostly sunny, 34 °F (1 °C)
- Game attendance: 1,351
- Referee: Joshua Kahle
- Box score, Recap

Game information
First quarter
- NCC – Ethan Greenfield 1-yard run (Magnus Meyer kick), 6:51. Cardinals 7–0. Drive: 9 plays, 45 yards, 4:26.
- NCC – DeAngelo Hardy 40-yard pass from Broc Rutter (Magnus Meyer kick), 2:27. Cardinals 14–0. Drive: 5 plays, 80 yards, 2:15.

Second quarter

- NCC – Magnus Meyer 22-yard field goal, 0:22. Cardinals 17–0. Drive: 11 plays, 52 yards, 3:34.

Third quarter

- DVU – Ryan Norton 9-yard pass from Anthony Fontana (Nick Restaino kick), 11:43. Cardinals 17–7. Drive: 8 plays, 77 yards, 3:12.
- DVU – Dan Allen 85-yard pass from Anthony Fontana (Nick Restaino kick), 9:00. Cardinals 17–14. Drive: 2 plays, 85 yards, 0:14.
- NCC – Andrew Kamienski 11-yard pass from Broc Rutter (Magnus Meyer kick), 4:27. Cardinals 24–14. Drive: 9 plays, 73 yards, 4:28.

Fourth quarter

- NCC – Ethan Greenfield 2-yard run (Magnus Meyer kick), 3:49. Cardinals 31–14. Drive: 12 plays, 79 yards, 6:20.

Statistics	DVU	NCC
First downs	16	24
Total yards	324	365
Rushing yards	92	102
Passing yards	232	263
Turnovers	2	1
Time of possession	25:51	34:09

Team	Category	Player	Statistics
Delaware Valley	Passing	Anthony Fontana	21/36, 232 yards, 2 TD, INT
Delaware Valley	Rushing	Donte Simmons	10 rushes, 71 yards
Delaware Valley	Receiving	Dan Allen	6 receptions, 155 yards, TD
North Central	Passing	Broc Rutter	23/33, 263 yards, 2 TD, INT
North Central	Rushing	Ethan Greenfield	28 rushes, 93 yards, 2 TD
North Central	Receiving	DeAngelo Hardy	9 receptions, 132 yards, TD

=== At No. 4 Muhlenberg (NCAA Division III Semifinal) ===
2019 NCAA Division III Playoffs Semifinal
No. 5 North Central Cardinals at No. 4 Muhlenberg Mules – Game summary

Quarter	1	2	3	4	Total
No. 5 Cardinals	21	17	7	0	45
No. 4 Mules	0	7	0	7	14

at Scotty Wood Stadium, Allentown, Pennsylvania

- Date: December 14
- Game time: 11:00 a.m. CST/12:00 p.m. EST
- Game weather: Rainy, 55 °F (13 °C)
- Game attendance: 3,845
- Referee: Bob Zanneo
- Box score, Recap

Game information
First quarter
- NCC – Andrew Kamienski 2-yard pass from Broc Rutter (Magnus Meyer kick), 9:27. Cardinals 7–0. Drive: 8 plays, 27 yards, 4:04.
- NCC – Blake Williams 51-yard pass from Broc Rutter (Magnus Meyer kick), 7:57. Cardinals 14–0. Drive: 1 play, 51 yards, 0:17.
- NCC – Andrew Kamienski 8-yard pass from Broc Rutter (Magnus Meyer kick), 5:09. Cardinals 21–0. Drive: 5 plays, 23 yards, 2:42.

Second quarter

- NCC – Andrew Kamienski 5-yard pass from Broc Rutter (Magnus Meyer kick), 14:20. Cardinals 28–0. Drive: 6 plays, 85 yards, 2:53.
- NCC – Andrew Kamienski 19-yard pass from Broc Rutter (Magnus Meyer kick), 6:51. Cardinals 35–0. Drive: 13 plays, 73 yards, 5:55.
- MUHL – James Diggs 1-yard run (Todd Spirt kick), 4:11. Cardinals 35–7. Drive: 8 plays, 73 yards, 2:37.
- NCC – Magnus Meyer 27-yard field goal, 0:00. Cardinals 38–7. Drive: 14 plays, 65 yards, 4:11.

Third quarter

- NCC – Terrence Hill 28-yard run (Magnus Meyer kick), 10:01. Cardinals 45–7. Drive: 4 plays, 65 yards, 2:16.

Fourth quarter

- MUHL – Ryan Curtiss 74-yard pass from Mike Hnatkowsky (Todd Spirt kick), 12:53. Cardinals 45–14. Drive: 3 plays, 80 yards, 1:14.

Statistics	NCC	MUHL
First downs	27	16
Total yards	486	362
Rushing yards	293	69
Passing yards	193	293
Turnovers	1	3
Time of possession	34:37	25:23

Team	Category	Player	Statistics
North Central	Passing	Broc Rutter	16/25, 193 yards, 5 TD, INT
North Central	Rushing	Ethan Greenfield	21 rushes, 199 yards
North Central	Receiving	Andrew Kamienski	11 receptions, 112 yards, 4 TD
Muhlenberg	Passing	Mike Hnatkowsky	23/41, 277 yards, TD, 2 INT
Muhlenberg	Rushing	James Diggs	9 rushes, 62 yards, TD
Muhlenberg	Receiving	Ryan Curtiss	5 receptions, 98 yards, TD

=== Vs. No. 7 Wisconsin–Whitewater (Stagg Bowl) ===
2019 Stagg Bowl
No. 7 Wisconsin–Whitewater Warhawks vs. No. 5 North Central Cardinals – Game summary

Quarter	1	2	3	4	Total
No. 7 Warhawks	0	0	7	7	14
No. 5 Cardinals	13	14	7	7	41

at Woodforest Bank Stadium, Shenandoah, Texas

- Date: December 20
- Game time: 7:00 p.m. CST
- Game weather: Cloudy, 49 °F (9 °C)
- Game attendance: 1,362
- Referee: Joe Horn
- Box score, Recap

Game information
First quarter
- NCC – Ethan Greenfield 5-yard run (run failed), 12:27. Cardinals 6–0. Drive: 7 plays, 45 yards, 2:24.
- NCC – Blake Williams 31-yard pass from Broc Rutter (Magnus Meyer kick), 0:35. Cardinals 13–0. Drive: 4 plays, 72 yards, 1:41.

Second quarter

- NCC – Broc Rutter 1-yard run (Magnus Meyer kick), 10:12. Cardinals 20–0. Drive: 9 plays, 46 yards, 3:49.
- NCC – Ethan Greenfield 2-yard run (Magnus Meyer kick), 1:49. Cardinals 27–0. Drive: 13 plays, 74 yards, 5:59.

Third quarter

- NCC – Ethan Greenfield 38-yard run (Magnus Meyer kick), 7:30. Cardinals 34–0. Drive: 9 plays, 80 yards, 4:35.
- UWW – Jared Zausch 12-yard pass from Max Meylor (Wojciech Gasienica kick), 4:52. Cardinals 34–7. Drive: 5 plays, 21 yards, 2:26.

Fourth quarter

- UWW – Alex Peete 1-yard run (Wojciech Gasienica kick), 9:32. Cardinals 34–14. Drive: 15 plays, 92 yards, 7:19.
- NCC – Andrew Kamienski 28-yard pass from Broc Rutter (Magnus Meyer kick), 1:58. Cardinals 41–14. Drive: 4 plays, 35 yards, 1:43.

Statistics	UWW	NCC
First downs	19	22
Total yards	390	436
Rushing yards	207	173
Passing yards	183	263
Turnovers	2	0
Time of possession	29:50	30:10

Team	Category	Player	Statistics
Wisconsin–Whitewater	Passing	Max Meylor	25/42, 183 yards, TD, 2 INT
Wisconsin–Whitewater	Rushing	Max Meylor	15 rushes, 104 yards
Wisconsin–Whitewater	Receiving	Tyler Holte	6 receptions, 64 yards
North Central	Passing	Broc Rutter	18/27, 263 yards, 2 TD
North Central	Rushing	Ethan Greenfield	27 rushes, 138 yards, 3 TD
North Central	Receiving	Andrew Kamienski	9 receptions, 134 yards, TD

== Personnel ==
2019 North Central Cardinals football team roster
Players
Coaches
Offense

Pos.	#	Name	Class
WR	1	Khori Blair	Jr
WR	3	Tommy Coates	Fr
WR	4	Matt Metz	Jr
WR	6	DeAngelo Hardy	Fr
QB	7	Arek Kleniuk	Fr
RB	8	Ethan Greenfield	So
QB	9	Broc Rutter	Sr
WR	11	Andrew Kamienski	Jr
QB	12	Jake Johnson	Fr
QB	13	Kevin Polaski	Fr
WR	15	Jodeci Chappa	Fr
RB	17	Eddie Villalobos	Fr
WR	18	Blake Williams	Jr
QB	19	Rob Simental	Fr
RB	20	Ronin Gilbert	Fr
WR	20	Jared Hornbeck	So
RB	22	Zach Garrett	Sr
RB	24	Armando Varela	Sr
RB	26	Rafael Rios	Fr
RB	28	Austin Ioerger	Fr
RB	41	Levi Doan	Fr
RB	42	Terrence Hill	So
RB	46	Jared Roberts	Fr
OL	53	Nathan Gray	Jr
OL	55	Sharmore Clarke	Jr
OL	57	Jordan Ryan	Jr
OL	59	Colton Bauknecht	Sr
OL	60	Vaughn Valone	So
OL	61	Bobby Gannon	Sr
OL	61	Cody Hardt	Fr
OL	62	Michael Hasenstab	So
OL	64	Derek Bex	Fr
OL	64	Derek Murphy	So
OL	65	Will Jandak	Fr
OL	67	Zach Fortier	Fr
OL	69	Daniel Dusik	Fr
OL	71	Jake Fiedler	Sr
OL	72	Will Ebert	So
OL	74	Jarod Thornton	Fr
OL	75	Jack Grupka	Fr
OL	75	Ricky Strba	Sr
OL	77	James Hart	Fr
WR	80	Rick Maziarka	Fr
WR	80	Axel Ponten	Jr
WR	81	Jake Robinson	Fr
WR	82	Jonathon Joyce	Fr
WR	82	Austin Zavis	Sr
TE	83	Tyler Egan	Sr
TE	84	Alex Rose	Sr
WR	85	Jarrett Crider	Fr
TE	85	Hunter Greve	So
WR	85	Bryce Santarelli	Fr
TE	86	Dana Anderson	Jr
TE	87	Joe Mohr	Fr
WR	88	Nic Rummell	Fr
TE	88	Tomas Savickas	Fr
TE	89	Sam Russchenberg	Fr
OL	90	Steven Niemann	Fr

Defense

Pos.	#	Name	Class
DB	1	Julian Bell	So
DB	2	Zach Greenberg	Sr
DB	3	Zach Butler	Jr
LB	3	Daniel Slaughter	Fr
DB	4	Dakota Cremeens	Jr
DB	5	De'Angelo Roberson	Jr
LB	6	Michael Baumgardner	So
LB	7	Bryan Beauchamp	Sr
LB	8	Sean Jacobs	Fr
DL	9	Tommy Hyland	Jr
DL	10	Talha Ayhan	Jr
DB	11	Tim Mayerhofer	Jr
DB	13	Cole Griffin	So
DB	14	Sam Taviani	So
DB	16	Alec Wolff	So
DB	17	Zach Witken	Sr
DB	21	Jake Beesley	Jr
DB	22	Daniel Morales	Fr
DB	23	Darius Cook	Sr
DB	23	Conner Rush	Fr
DB	25	Braden Lindmark	So
DB	27	Javon Lee	Fr
DB	28	Zach Weiss	Fr
DB	29	Trevor Tesmond	So
DB	30	Payton Voitik	Fr
DB	31	Garrett Fiduccia	So
LB	31	Logan Graham	Fr
LB	32	John Daway	Fr
LB	33	Ben Wong	Jr
DB	34	Joey Carrell	Fr
DB	34	Drew Vasquez	Sr
LB	35	Jamauri Spivery	Jr
LB	37	Eric Letterer	Jr
LB	38	Adam Maluchnik	Jr
DL	39	Dan Gilroy	So
LB	40	Braden Hasty	So
LB	40	Jake See	Fr
LB	43	Mo Abuzir	Fr
LB	43	Jordan Kraft	So
DL	44	Spenser Eversole	Jr
LB	45	Storm Simmons	Jr
LB	47	Miguel Delvalle	Fr
LB	47	Adam Green	Fr
LB	48	Gavin Bauknecht	Fr
DL	48	Cameron Martin	Jr
LB	49	Adam Haushahn	So
DB	49	Will Kettelkamp	Fr
LB	50	Griffin Paige	Jr
LB	52	Sean Gorman	So
DL	54	Jack Cooper	So
DL	56	George Western	Fr
LB	57	Chance Roberts	Fr
DL	58	Owen Henriques	Sr
DL	63	Brandon Greifelt	So
DL	65	Ethan Kiley	Jr
DL	68	Isiah Ziegler	So
DL	74	Ryan Ohlsen	So
DL	92	Zach Hartman	Fr
DL	97	Alex Debolt	Sr
DL	98	Matt Quinn	Fr
DL	99	Tyler Rich	So

Special teams

Pos.	#	Name	Class
K	41	Magnus Meyer	Fr
K	46	Thomas Mitchell	Fr

Head coach

- Jeff Thorne

Coordinators/assistant coaches

- Brad Spencer – Assistant Head Coach/Offensive Coordinator/Recruiting Coordinator
- Shane Dierking – Defensive Coordinator/Defensive Backs Coach
- Tim Janecek – Defensive Line Coach/Strength Coordinator
- Eric Stuedemann – Offensive Line Coach
- Joe Fehrle – Graduate Assistant Football Coach
- Emonte Logan – Graduate Assistant Football Coach
- Liam Crotty – Kicking Coach
- Mavolio Grier – Defensive Line Coach
- John Howell – Defensive Backs Coach
- Greg Jensik – Tight Ends Coach
- Matt Sinclair – Linebackers Coach
- Dylan Warden – Wide Receivers Coach
- Dan Starkey – Running Backs Coach
- Don Sutherland – Linebackers Coach
- Evan Lindborg – Student Assistant Coach
- Michael Sfikas – Student Assistant Coach
- Seth Taylor – Student Assistant Coach

Legend

- (C) Team captain
- (S) Suspended
- (I) Ineligible
- Injured
- Redshirt

Roster
