= Jeff Thorne =

American football player and coach (1972–2025)

Biographical details
- Born: March 12, 1972; Normal, Illinois, U.S.
- Died: December 9, 2025 (aged 53); Naperville, Illinois, U.S.

Playing career
- 1990–1993: Eastern Illinois
- Position: Quarterback

Coaching career (HC unless noted)
- 1994–2001: Wheaton Warrenville South HS (IL) (OC/QB)
- 2002–2014: North Central (IL) (OC)
- 2015–2021: North Central (IL)
- 2022: Western Michigan (OC/QB)

Head coaching record
- Overall: 65–10
- Tournaments: 11–4 (NCAA D-III playoffs)

Accomplishments and honors

Championships
- 1 NCAA Division III (2019); 4 CCIW (2016–2018, 2021)

Awards
- CCIW Coach of the Year (2016); D3football.com National Coach of the Year (2019)

Jeffery Aaron Thorne (March 12, 1972 – December 9, 2025) was an American college football coach and player. He was the offensive coordinator at Western Michigan University in Kalamazoo, Michigan in 2022. Thorne served as the head football coach at North Central College from 2015 to 2021. He succeeded his father, John Thorne, and led the 2019 team to an NCAA Division III national title. Thorne played college football at Eastern Illinois University, starting at quarterback in the early 1990s. His son, Payton, is currently a quarterback for the Winnipeg Blue Bombers as of 2026.

== Playing career ==
Thorne attended Wheaton Central High School in Wheaton, Illinois where he played under his father, head coach John Thorne. He set the state record for career touchdown passes with 57. He started as a sophomore and threw for over 1,000 yards. His senior season, he led the team to a 5A state semifinal appearance and was named all-state. He played in the Illinois High School All-Star game and was named MVP. He also played baseball and was an all-conference selection in basketball.

Thorne then enrolled at Eastern Illinois University and was a four year starter. He was selected all-Gateway Conference honorable mention after his junior season in 1992 after throwing for 1944 yards and 10 touchdowns. His senior season he earned 2nd team all-conference honors. He holds the school record for most interceptions thrown in a game with seven in a 7-49 loss to McNeese State. He ranks in the top ten in school history in season pass efficiency, touchdown passes, and interceptions. Thorne ranks fourth in career total offense, passing yardage, passing attempts, and completions categories behind Jimmy Garoppolo, Sean Payton, and Tony Romo.

== Coaching career ==
=== Assistant coaching ===
After graduation, Thorne became an assistant coach at his former high school under his father coaching during three state championship seasons. Thorne became offensive coordinator for Division III North Central College in 2002, the same year his father became head coach. He was a finalist for coordinator of the year in 2013 after his offense average over 45 points per game on route to a National Championship appearance.

=== North Central ===
After his father's retirement, Thorne was named head coach for the 2015 season. After the 2016 season, Thorne was named College Conference of Illinois & Wisconsin coach of the year and AFCA Region Coach of the Year. He was named D3football.com Coach of the Year after his 2019 National Championship. Thorne coached the 2019 Gagliardi Trophy winner Broc Rutter.

=== Western Michigan ===
On February 1, 2022, Thorne was named the offensive coordinator for Western Michigan under head coach Tim Lester. Under Thorne, the offense averaged 301.9 yards per game during the 2022 season, last in the MAC. Western Michigan finished the year 5-7, including 4-4 in conference, good for third place in the MAC West. Thorne, along with most of the coaching staff, was let go when Lester was fired on November 28.

== Death ==
Thorne died on December 9, 2025, at the age of 53, after a battle with stomach cancer, according to North Central College.

== Head coaching record ==
Year	Team	Overall	Conference	Standing	Bowl/playoffs	AFCA^{#}	D3^{°}
North Central Cardinals (College Conference of Illinois and Wisconsin) (2015–2021)
2015	North Central	7–3	6–1	2nd			
2016	North Central	11–1	8–0	1st	L NCAA Division III Second Round		10
2017	North Central	10–2	7–1	T–1st	L NCAA Division III Second Round		8
2018	North Central	10–2	8–1	T–1st	L NCAA Division III Second Round		8
2019	North Central	14–1	8–1	2nd	W NCAA Division III Championship		1
2020–21	No team—COVID-19						
2021	North Central	13–1	9–0	1st	L NCAA Division III Championship	2	2
North Central:		65–10	46–4				
Total:		65–10					
National championship Conference title Conference division title or championship game berth
