= 2019 NCAA Division III football rankings =

- Season: 2019
- Postseason: Single-elimination
- Preseason No. 1: Mary Hardin–Baylor
- National champions: North Central (IL)
- Conference with most teams in final poll: MIAC (3)

Two human polls and a committee's selections comprise the 2019 National Collegiate Athletic Association (NCAA) Division III football rankings. Unlike in Division I's Football Bowl Subdivision (FBS), the NCAA, Division III college football's governing body, bestows a national championship on the winner of the Stagg Bowl – the championship round of a 32-team postseason tournament. The main weekly poll that begins in the preseason is the D3football.com poll, which ranks the top 25 colleges in Division III football. The AFCA Division III Coaches Poll is released beginning midway through the season.

== Legend ==
	Increase in ranking
	Decrease in ranking
	Not ranked previous week
	Selected for Division III Football Championship Playoffs
(#–#)	Win–loss record
(Italics)	Number of first place votes
т	Tied with team above or below also with this symbol

== D3football.com poll ==
	Preseason August 8	Week 1 September 8	Week 2 September 15	Week 3 September 22	Week 4 September 29	Week 5 October 6	Week 6 October 13	Week 7 October 20	Week 8 October 27	Week 9 November 3	Week 10 November 10	Week 11 November 17	Final December 22	
1.	Mary Hardin–Baylor (24)	Mary Hardin–Baylor (0–0) (24)	Mary Hardin–Baylor (1–0) (24)	Mary Hardin–Baylor (2–0) (18)	Mary Hardin–Baylor (3–0) (19)	Mary Hardin–Baylor (4–0) (19)	Mary Hardin–Baylor (5–0) (18)	Mary Hardin–Baylor (6–0) (17)	Mount Union (7–0) (15)	Mount Union (8–0) (15)	Mount Union (9–0) (15)	Mount Union (10–0) (14)	North Central (IL) (14–1) (25)	1.
2.	Mount Union (1)	Mount Union (1–0) (1)	Mount Union (1–0) (1)	Mount Union (2–0) (7)	Mount Union (3–0) (6)	Mount Union (4–0) (6)	Mount Union (5–0) (7)	Mount Union (6–0) (8)	Mary Hardin–Baylor (7–0) (10)	Mary Hardin–Baylor (8–0) (10)	Mary Hardin–Baylor (9–0) (10)	Mary Hardin–Baylor (10–0) (11)	Wisconsin–Whitewater (13–2)	2.
3.	Saint John's (MN)	Wisconsin–Whitewater (1–0)	Wisconsin–Whitewater (2–0)	Wisconsin–Whitewater (3–0)	Wisconsin–Whitewater (3–0)	Wisconsin–Whitewater (4–0)	Wisconsin–Whitewater (5–0)	Wisconsin–Whitewater (6–0)	Wisconsin–Whitewater (7–0)	Wisconsin–Whitewater (8–0)	Wisconsin–Whitewater (9–0)	Wheaton (IL) (10–0)	Mount Union (11–1)	3.
4.	Wisconsin–Whitewater	Saint John's (MN) (1–0)	Saint John's (MN) (1–0)	Saint John's (MN) (2–0)	Saint John's (MN) (3–0)	Saint John's (MN) (4–0)	Saint John's (MN) (5–0)	Saint John's (MN) (6–0)	Saint John's (MN) (7–0)	Wheaton (IL) (8–0)	Wheaton (IL) (9–0)	Muhlenberg (10–0)	Saint John's (MN) (12–2)	4.
5.	North Central (IL)	North Central (IL) (1–0)	North Central (IL) (1–0)	North Central (IL) (2–0)	North Central (IL) (3–0)	Wheaton (IL) (4–0)	Wheaton (IL) (5–0)	Wheaton (IL) (6–0)	Wheaton (IL) (7–0)	Muhlenberg (8–0)	Muhlenberg (9–0)	North Central (IL) (9–1)	Wheaton (IL) (12–1)	5.
6.	Johns Hopkins	St. Thomas (MN) (1–0)	St. Thomas (MN) (1–0)	St. Thomas (MN) (2–0)	Hardin–Simmons (4–0)	Bethel (MN) (4–0)	Muhlenberg (5–0)	Muhlenberg (6–0)	Muhlenberg (7–0)	North Central (IL) (7–1)	North Central (IL) (8–1)	Salisbury (9–0)	Mary Hardin–Baylor (12–1)	6.
7.	St. Thomas (MN)	Johns Hopkins (1–0)	Hardin–Simmons (2–0)	Hardin–Simmons (3–0)	Bethel (MN) (3–0)	Muhlenberg (5–0)	Berry (6–0)	North Central (IL) (5–1)	North Central (IL) (6–1)	Salisbury (7–0)	Salisbury (8–0)	Wisconsin–Whitewater (9–1)	Muhlenberg (13–1)	7.
8.	Muhlenberg	Muhlenberg (1–0)	Muhlenberg (2–0)	Bethel (MN) (2–0)	Muhlenberg (4–0)	Berry (5–0)	North Central (IL) (4–1)	Ithaca (6–0)	Ithaca (7–0)	Saint John's (MN) (7–1)	Saint John's (MN) (8–1)	Saint John's (MN) (8–1)	Delaware Valley (11–2)	8.
9.	Hardin–Simmons	Hardin–Simmons (1–0)	Bethel (MN) (2–0)	Muhlenberg (3–0)	Wheaton (IL) (3–0)	North Central (IL) (3–1)	Ithaca (5–0)	Bethel (MN) (5–1)	Bethel (MN) (6–1)	Bethel (MN) (7–1)	Bethel (MN) (8–1)	Delaware Valley (9–1)	Salisbury (11–1)	9.
10.	Bethel (MN)	Bethel (MN) (1–0)	Whitworth (1–0)	Berry (3–0)	Berry (4–0)	Ithaca (4–0)	Bethel (MN) (4–1)	Salisbury (5–0)	Salisbury (6–0)	John Carroll (7–1)	John Carroll (8–1)	Wesley (9–1)	Chapman (10–1)	10.
11.	Whitworth	Whitworth (1–0)	Linfield (1–0)	Wheaton (IL) (2–0)	Ithaca (3–0)	St. Thomas (MN) (3–1)	St. Thomas (MN) (4–1)	John Carroll (5–1)	John Carroll (6–1)	Wartburg (8–0)	Delaware Valley (8–1)	John Carroll (9–1)	Wesley (10–2)	11.
12.	Linfield	Linfield (0–0)	Washington & Jefferson (2–0)	John Carroll (2–0)	Wesley (3–0)	Wesley (4–0)	Salisbury (4–0)	Wartburg (7–0)	Wartburg (7–0)	Wesley (7–1)	Wesley (8–1)	Chapman (9–0)	Union (11–1)	12.
13.	Brockport	Delaware Valley (1–0)	Berry (2–0)	Ithaca (2–0)	Delaware Valley (3–1)	Delaware Valley (4–1)	John Carroll (4–1)	Wesley (5–1)	Wisconsin–Platteville (6–1)	Delaware Valley (8–1)	Chapman (8–0)	Union (10–0)	John Carroll (9–1)	13.
14.	Delaware Valley	Illinois Wesleyan (0–0)	John Carroll (1–0)	Wesley (3–0)	St. Thomas (MN) (2–1)	Salisbury (3–0)	Wartburg (6–0)	Delaware Valley (6–1)	Wesley (6–1)	Union (8–0)	Union (9–0)	St. Thomas (MN) (8–2)	Wartburg (10–2)	14.
15.	Illinois Wesleyan	Washington & Jefferson (1–0)	Wesley (2–0)	Delaware Valley (2–1)	Salisbury (2–0)	Redlands (4–0)	Wesley (4–1)	Hardin–Simmons (5–1)	Delaware Valley (7–1)	Chapman (7–0)	Hardin–Simmons (7–2)	Susquehanna (9–1)	St. Thomas (MN) (8–2)	15.
16.	Berry	Berry (1–0)	Wisconsin–La Crosse (2–0)	Wisconsin–La Crosse (2–1)	Wisconsin–La Crosse (2–1)	John Carroll (3–1)	Delaware Valley (5–1)	Wisconsin–Platteville (5–1)	Chapman (6–0)	Hardin–Simmons (6–2)	Susquehanna (8–1)	Hardin–Simmons (8–2)	Susquehanna (10–1)	16.
17.	John Carroll	John Carroll (1–0)	Wheaton (IL) (1–0)	Salisbury (2–0)	John Carroll (2–1)	Hardin–Simmons (4–1)	Hardin–Simmons (4–1)	Chapman (5–0)	Hardin–Simmons (5–2)	Ithaca (7–1)	St. Thomas (MN) (7–2)	Redlands (9–1)	Central (10–2)	17.
18.	Wittenberg	Centre (1–0)	Illinois Wesleyan (0–1)	Johns Hopkins (2–1)	Redlands (3–0)	Wartburg (5–0)	Wisconsin–Platteville (4–1)	St. Thomas (MN) (4–2)	Cortland (7–0)	St. Thomas (MN) (6–2)	Redlands (8–1)	Wisconsin–Oshkosh (8–2)	Redlands (9–2)	18.
19.	RPI	RPI (1–0)	Centre (2–0)	Redlands (3–0)	Johns Hopkins (3–1)	Wisconsin–Platteville (4–0)	Chapman (4–0)	Cortland (6–0)	St. Thomas (MN) (5–2)	Susquehanna (7–1)	Linfield (7–1)	Bethel (MN) (8–2)	Linfield (8–2)	19.
20.	Centre	Wheaton (IL) (1–0)	Delaware Valley (1–1)	Wartburg (3–0)	Wartburg (4–0)	Johns Hopkins (4–1)	Johns Hopkins (4–1)	Susquehanna (5–1)	Susquehanna (6–1)	Case Western Reserve (8–0)	Case Western Reserve (9–0)	Linfield (8–1)	Bridgewater (10–1)	20.
21.	Washington & Jefferson	Wabash (0–0)	Johns Hopkins (1–1)	Whitworth (1–1)	Hobart (4–0)	Susquehanna (4–1)	Susquehanna (4–1)	Case Western Reserve (6–0)	Case Western Reserve (7–0)	Redlands (7–1)	Bridgewater (9–0)	Bridgewater (10–0)	Hardin–Simmons (8–2)	21.
22.	Wheaton (IL)	Wesley (1–0)	Ithaca (1–0)	Linfield (1–1)	Susquehanna (3–1)	Cortland (4–0)	Cortland (5–0)	Berry (6–1)	Berry (7–1)	Berry (7–1)	Brockport (8–1)	Wartburg (9–1)	Wisonsin–Oshkosh (8–3)	22.
23.	Wabash	Wisconsin–La Crosse (1–0)	Salisbury (2–0)	Trine (3–0)	Whitworth (1–1)	Linfield (2–1)	Case Western Reserve (5–0)	Redlands (5–1)	Redlands (6–1)	Linfield (6–1)	Berry (8–1)	Berry (9–1)	Bethel (MN) (8–2)	23.
24.	Randolph–Macon	Ithaca (1–0)	Washington (MO) (1–0)	Susquehanna (2–1)	Trine (3–0)	Whitworth (2–1)	Redlands (4–1)	Linfield (4–1)	Linfield (5–1)	Bridgewater (8–0)	Wartburg (8–1)	Central (9–1)	Aurora (9–2)	24.
25.	St. Norbert	Wittenberg (0–1)	Susquehanna (2–0)	Hobart (3–0)	Linfield (1–1)	Case Western Reserve (4–0)	Linfield (3–1)	Union (6–0)	Union (7–0)	Texas Lutheran (7–1)	Central (8–1)	Wisconsin–La Crosse (7–3)	Brockport (9–3)	25.
	Preseason August 8	Week 1 September 8	Week 2 September 15	Week 3 September 22	Week 4 September 29	Week 5 October 6	Week 6 October 13	Week 7 October 20	Week 8 October 27	Week 9 November 3	Week 10 November 10	Week 11 November 17	Final December 22	
		Dropped: No. 13 Brockport; No. 24 Randolph–Macon; No. 25 St. Norbert	Dropped: No. 19. RPI; No. 21 Wabash; No. 25 Wittenberg	Dropped: No. 12 Washington & Jefferson; No. 18 Illinois Wesleyan; No. 19 Centre; No. 24 Washington (MO)	None	Dropped: No. 16 Wisconsin–La Crosse; No. 21 Hobart; No. 24 Trine	Dropped: No. 25 Whitworth	Dropped: No. 20 Johns Hopkins	None	Dropped: No. 13 Wisconsin–Platteville; No. 18 Cortland	Dropped: No. 17 Ithaca; No. 25 Texas Lutheran	Dropped: No. 20 Case Western Reserve; No. 22 Brockport	Dropped: No. 23 Berry; No. 25 Wisonsin–La Crosse	

== AFCA Coaches Poll ==
	Week 3 September 23	Week 4 September 30	Week 5 October 7	Week 6 October 14	Week 7 October 21	Week 8 October 28	Week 9 November 4	Week 10 November 11	Week 11 November 18	Final December 23	
1.	Mary Hardin–Baylor (2–0) (40)	Mary Hardin–Baylor (3–0) (44)	Mary Hardin–Baylor (4–0) (45)	Mary Hardin–Baylor (5–0) (43)	Mary Hardin–Baylor (6–0) (43)	Mary Hardin–Baylor (7–0) (41)	Mary Hardin–Baylor (8–0) (35)	Mary Hardin–Baylor (9–0) (37)	Mary Hardin–Baylor (10–0) (38)	North Central (IL) (14–1) (53)	1.
2.	Mount Union (2–0) (13)	Mount Union (3–0) (9)	Mount Union (4–0) (8)	Mount Union (5–0) (10)	Mount Union (6–0) (10)	Mount Union (7–0) (12)	Mount Union (8–0) (17)	Mount Union (9–0) (15)	Mount Union (10–0) (15)	Wisconsin–Whitewater (13–2)	2.
3.	Wisconsin–Whitewater (3–0)	Wisconsin–Whitewater (3–0)	Wisconsin–Whitewater (4–0)	Wisconsin–Whitewater (5–0)	Wisconsin–Whitewater (6–0)	Wisconsin–Whitewater (7–0)	Wisconsin–Whitewater (8–0)	Wisconsin–Whitewater (9–0)	Wheaton (IL) (10–0)	Saint John's (MN) (12–2)	3.
4.	Saint John's (MN) (2–0)	Saint John's (MN) (3–0)	Saint John's (MN) (4–0)	Saint John's (MN) (5–0)	Saint John's (MN) (6–0)	Saint John's (MN) (7–0)	Wheaton (IL) (8–0)	Wheaton (IL) (9–0)	Muhlenberg (10–0)	Mary Hardin–Baylor (12–1)	4.
5.	North Central (IL) (2–0)	North Central (IL) (3–0)	Muhlenberg (5–0)	Wheaton (IL) (5–0)	Wheaton (IL) (6–0)	Wheaton (IL) (7–0)	Muhlenberg (8–0)	Muhlenberg (9–0)	North Central (IL) (9–1)	Muhlenberg (13–1)	5.
6.	St. Thomas (MN) (2–0)	Hardin–Simmons (4–0)	Wheaton (IL) (4–0)	Muhlenberg (5–0)	Muhlenberg (6–0)	Muhlenberg (7–0)	North Central (IL) (7–1)	North Central (IL) (8–1)	Salisbury (9–0)	Wheaton (IL) (12–1)	6.
7.	Hardin–Simmons (3–0)	Muhlenberg (4–0)	Berry (5–0)	Berry (6–0)	Ithaca (6–0)	Ithaca (7–0)	Wartburg (8–0)	Salisbury (8–0)	John Carroll (9–1)	Mount Union (11–1)	7.
8.	Muhlenberg (3–0)	Berry (4–0)	Wesley (4–0)	Ithaca (5–0)	North Central (IL) (5–1)	North Central (IL) (6–1)	Salisbury (7–0)	John Carroll (8–1)	Saint John's (MN) (9–1)	Delaware Valley (11–2)	8.
9.	John Carroll (2–0)	Wheaton (IL) (3–0)	Bethel (MN) (4–0)	Wartburg (6–0)	Wartburg (7–0)	Wartburg (7–0)	John Carroll (7–1)	Delaware Valley (8–1)	Delaware Valley (9–1)	Salisbury (11–1)	9.
10.	Berry (3–0)	Wesley (3–0)	Ithaca (4–0)	North Central (IL) (4–1)	Salisbury (5–0)	Salisbury (6–0)	Delaware Valley (8–1)	Bethel (MN) (8–1)	Wisconsin–Whitewater (9–1)	John Carroll (9–1)	10.
11.	Wesley (3–0) т	Bethel (MN) (3–0)	Wartburg (5–0)	Salisbury (4–0)	Delaware Valley (6–1) т	John Carroll (6–1)	Bethel (MN) (7–1)	Saint John's (MN) (8–1)	Wesley (9–1)	Chapman (10–1)	11.
12.	Wheaton (IL) (2–0) т	Ithaca (3–0)	North Central (IL) (3–1)	Delaware Valley (5–1)	John Carroll (5–1) т	Delaware Valley (7–1)	Saint John's (MN) (7–1)	Wesley (8–1)	Hardin–Simmons (8–2)	Wesley (10–2)	12.
13.	Bethel (MN) (2–0)	Wartburg (4–0)	Delaware Valley (4–1)	John Carroll (4–1) т	Bethel (MN) (5–1)	Bethel (MN) (6–1)	Wesley (7–1)	Hardin–Simmons (7–2)	Chapman (9–0)	Wartburg (10–2)	13.
14.	Ithaca (2–0)	Delaware Valley (3–1)	John Carroll (3–1)	St. Thomas (MN) (4–1) т	Hardin–Simmons (5–1)	Wesley (6–1)	Hardin–Simmons (6–2)	Chapman (8–0)	Union (10–0)	Hardin–Simmons (8–2)	14.
15.	Wartburg (3–0)	John Carroll (2–1)	Salisbury (3–0)	Bethel (MN) (4–1)	Wesley (5–1)	Wisconsin–Platteville (6–1)	Case Western Reserve (8–0)	Case Western Reserve (9–0)	Linfield (8–1)	Union (11–1)	15.
16.	Salisbury (2–0)	Salisbury (2–0)	St. Thomas (MN) (3–1)	Johns Hopkins (4–1)	Wisconsin–Platteville (5–1)	Hardin–Simmons (5–2)	Chapman (7–0)	Union (9–0)	Susquehanna (9–1)	Linfield (8–2)	16.
17.	Delaware Valley (2–1)	St. Thomas (MN) (2–1)	Redlands (4–0)	Hardin–Simmons (4–1)	Case Western Reserve (6–0)	Case Western Reserve (7–0)	Union (8–0)	Linfield (7–1)	Wartburg (9–1)	Central (10–2)	17.
18.	Johns Hopkins (2–1)	Johns Hopkins (3–1)	Johns Hopkins (4–1)	Wesley (4–1)	Cortland (6–0)	Cortland (7–0)	Linfield (6–1)	Susquehanna (8–1)	St. Thomas (MN) (8–2)	Susquehanna (10–1)	18.
19.	Wisconsin–La Crosse (2–1)	Redlands (3–0)	Wisconsin–Platteville (4–0)	Case Western Reserve (5–0)	Linfield (4–1) т	Chapman (6–0)	Ithaca (7–1) т	Wartburg (8–1)	Berry (9–1)	St. Thomas (MN) (8–2)	19.
20.	Redlands (3–0)	Wisconsin–La Crosse (2–1)	Hardin–Simmons (4–1)	Wisconsin–Platteville (4–1)	Chapman (5–0) т	Linfield (5–1)	Susquehanna (7–1) т	Berry (8–1)	Bridgewater (10–0)	Bridgewater (10–1)	20.
21.	Linfield (1–1)	Hobart (4–0)	Case Western Reserve (4–0)	Cortland (5–0)	Berry (6–1)	Berry (7–1)	Berry (7–1)	St. Thomas (MN) (7–2)	Wisconsin–Oshkosh (8–2)	Wisconsin–Oshkosh (8–3)	21.
22.	Hobart (3–0)	Linfield (1–1)	Linfield (2–1)	Linfield (3–1)	Susquehanna (5–1)	Susquehanna (6–1)	St. Thomas (MN) (6–2)	Bridgewater (9–0)	Redlands (9–1)	Redlands (9–2)	22.
23.	Whitworth (1–1)	Trine (3–0)	Central (4–0)	Susquehanna (4–1)	St. Thomas (MN) (4–2)	St. Thomas (MN) (5–2)	Bridgewater (8–0)	Redlands (8–1)	Central (9–1)	Berry (9–2)	23.
24.	Trine (3–0)	Wisconsin–Platteville (3–0)	Susquehanna (4–1)	Chapman (4–0)	Union (6–0)	Union (7–0)	Redlands (7–1)	Central (8–1)	Bethel (MN) (8–2)	Bethel (MN) (8–2)	24.
25.	Case Western Reserve (2–0)	Case Western Reserve (3–0)	Cortland (4–0)	Union (5–0)	Bridgewater (6–0)	Bridgewater (7–0)	Brockport (7–1)	Brockport (8–1)	Case Western Reserve (9–1)	Brockport (9–3)	25.
	Week 3 September 23	Week 4 September 30	Week 5 October 7	Week 6 October 14	Week 7 October 21	Week 8 October 28	Week 9 November 4	Week 10 November 11	Week 11 November 18	Final December 23	
		Dropped: No. 23 Whitworth	Dropped: No. 20 Wisconsin–La Crosse; No. 21 Hobart; No. 23 Trine	Dropped: No. 17 Redlands; No. 23 Central	Dropped: No. 16 Johns Hopkins	None	Dropped: No. 15 Wisconsin–Platteville; No. 18 Cortland	Dropped: No. 19т Ithaca	Dropped: No. 25 Brockport	Dropped: No. 25 Case Western Reserve	
