= Ben Bartch =

American football player (born 1998)

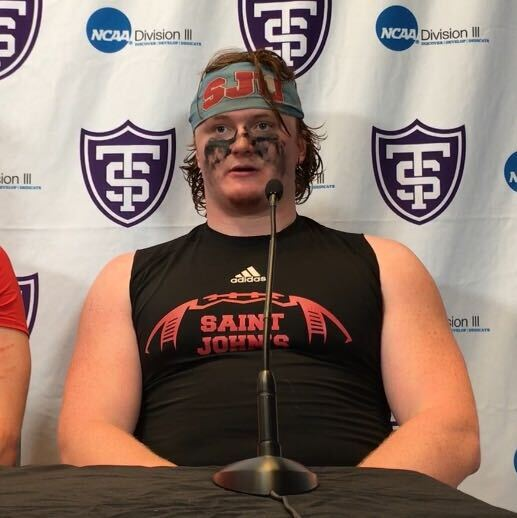
- Bartch with Saint John's (MN) in 2019

No. 78 – Detroit Lions
- Position: Guard
- Roster status: Injured reserve

Personal information
- Born: July 22, 1998 (age 28); McMinnville, Oregon, U.S.
- Listed height: 6 ft 6 in (1.98 m)
- Listed weight: 318 lb (144 kg)

Career information
- High school: Blanchet Catholic (Salem, Oregon)
- College: Saint John's (MN) (2016–2019)
- NFL draft: 2020: 4th round, 116th overall pick

Career history
- Jacksonville Jaguars (2020–2023); San Francisco 49ers (2023–2025); Detroit Lions (2026–present)

Awards and highlights
- Second-team DIII All-American (2019); First-team All-MIAC (2019); Second-team All-MIAC (2018)

Career NFL statistics as of Week 7, 2026
- Games played: 57
- Games started: 25
- Stats at Pro Football Reference

Benjamin Bartch (born July 22, 1998) is an American professional football guard for the Detroit Lions of the National Football League (NFL). He played college football for the Saint John's Johnnies and was selected in the fourth round of the 2020 NFL draft by the Jacksonville Jaguars.

== Early life ==
Bartch grew up in McMinnville, Oregon, and attended Blanchet Catholic School where he played receiver, tight end, and linebacker. Although he was tall, Bartch was also very skinny and was primarily a backup receiver for Blanchet, not yet discovered for his blocking abilities; as a senior, Bartch was billed at 195 pounds and only a recorded a handful of receptions and tackles. He was not recruited after high school and chose to play at Saint John's University, a Division III program. He was also a 4-year letterer in basketball at Blanchet.

== College career ==
Bartch began his collegiate career playing tight end. Entering Saint John's, Bartch was billed at 220 pounds, appearing in one game as a freshman. As a sophomore, Bartch was the team's third-string tight end, catching four passes for 43 yards and one touchdown, mostly contributing to special teams.

His coaches noticed his blocking ability, with one calling it "a hidden natural-born talent" and suggested he move to the offensive line going into his junior season. In order to gain weight, Bartch consumed a protein shake daily consisting of 7 scrambled eggs, a tub of cottage cheese, quick grits, peanut butter, bananas, and Gatorade, growing from 240 pounds to 275 in just the summer. He eventually reached 308 pounds with this method. Bartch became the Johnnies starting left tackle and was named second-team All-Minnesota Intercollegiate Athletic Conference (MIAC) and to the Allstate AFCA Good Works Team at the end of the season. As a senior, Bartch was named first-team All-MIAC and a consensus first-team All-American by D3Football.com, as well as second-team All-American by the Associated Press. Considered a prospect in the 2020 NFL draft, Bartch was invited to participate in the 2020 Senior Bowl. A rival coach wrote that Ben Bartch was "the best D3 player I had ever seen" and that he was "by far the best player on that team" despite playing alongside two Power Five transfers at Saint John's, including a quarterback from Penn State.

Bartch also competed on Saint John's track and field team in shot put and discus throw events.

== Professional career ==
Pre-draft measurables
Height	Weight	Arm length	Hand span	Wingspan
6 ft 5 3/4 in (1.97 m)	309 lb (140 kg)	32 7/8 in (0.84 m)	9 in (0.23 m)	6 ft 8 1/2 in (2.04 m)
All values from NFL Combine

=== Jacksonville Jaguars ===
Bartch was selected in the fourth round of the 2020 NFL draft by the Jacksonville Jaguars. He became the first Saint John's player to be drafted since 1974 and the first player to be drafted from any Division III program since the Tampa Bay Buccaneers selected Ali Marpet in 2015. Bartch made his NFL debut on September 13, 2020, in the season opener against the Indianapolis Colts, playing five snaps on special teams. He was placed on the reserve/COVID-19 list by the Jaguars on December 15, 2020, and activated on January 5, 2021.

Bartch entered the 2022 season as the Jaguars starting left guard. He suffered a dislocated knee in Week 5 and was placed on injured reserve on October 11, 2022.

Bartch returned as the starting left guard in 2023, but was benched in Week 4. He was waived on October 31, 2023, after the Jaguars traded for Ezra Cleveland. On November 3, Bartch was re-signed to the practice squad.

=== San Francisco 49ers ===
On November 21, 2023, Bartch was signed by the San Francisco 49ers to their active roster off of the Jaguars' practice squad. On December 12, 2024, Bartch was placed on injured reserve.

On February 24, 2025, Bartch signed a one-year contract extension with the 49ers. On September 17, Bartch was placed on injured reserve, having suffered a high-ankle sprain in Week 2 against the New Orleans Saints. On November 8, Bartch was activated ahead of the 49ers' Week 10 matchup against the Los Angeles Rams. On December 8, Bartch was placed back on injured reserve after suffering a significant foot sprain in Week 13 against the Cleveland Browns.

=== Detroit Lions ===
On March 25, 2026, Bartch signed a one-year contract with the Detroit Lions. On October 16, Bartch was placed on injured reserve.
