= John Thorne (American football) =

American football coach (born 1947)

Biographical details
- Born: October 29, 1947 (age 79)

Coaching career (HC unless noted)
- 1980–2001: Wheaton Warrenville South HS (IL)
- 2002–2014: North Central (IL)
- 2015–?: North Central (IL) (assistant)

Head coaching record
- Overall: 118–30 (college); 181–65 (high school)
- Tournaments: 10–8 (NCAA D-III playoffs)

Accomplishments and honors

Championships
- 8 CCIW (2006–2013); 4 IHSA state titles (1992, 1995, 1996, 1998)

Awards
- 3× CCIW Coach of the Year (2008, 2010–2011)

John Thorne (born October 29, 1947) is an American former football coach. He served as the head football coach at North Central College in Naperville, Illinois from 2002 to 2014, compiling a record of 118–30.

== Career ==
From 2002 to 2014 he served at head football coach at North Central, compiling a record of 118–30. In 2015, Thorne stepped down from his position as head coach and was replaced by his son, Jeff Thorne. Thorne also served as head coach at Wheaton Warrenville South High School (formerly known as Wheaton Central High School) from 1980 to 2001, winning four state championships.

== Honors ==
In 2016, Thorne was inducted into the NCC Athletic Hall of Fame.

== Head coaching record ==
=== College ===
Year	Team	Overall	Conference	Standing	Bowl/playoffs
North Central Cardinals (College Conference of Illinois and Wisconsin) (2002–2014)
2002	North Central	6–4	4–3	T–3rd	
2003	North Central	7–3	4–3		
2004	North Central	7–3	4–3	T–4th	
2005	North Central	9–2	6–1	2nd	L NCAA Division III First Round
2006	North Central	9–3	6–1	T–1st	L NCAA Division III Second Round
2007	North Central	9–3	6–1	T–1st	L NCAA Division III Second Round
2008	North Central	11–1	7–0	1st	L NCAA Division III Second Round
2009	North Central	8–2	6–1	T–1st	
2010	North Central	12–1	7–0	1st	L NCAA Division III Quarterfinal
2011	North Central	10–2	7–0	1st	L NCAA Division III Second Round
2012	North Central	9–3	6–1	T–1st	L NCAA Division III Second Round
2013	North Central	13–1	7–0	1st	L NCAA Division III Semifinal
2014	North Central	8–2	6–1	2nd	
North Central:		118–30	76–15		
Total:		118–30			
National championship Conference title Conference division title or championship game berth
