= 2019 Case Western Reserve Spartans football team =

American college football season

2019 Case Western Reserve Spartans football

PAC champion

NCAA Division III First Round, L 21–24 vs. Union (NY)
- Conference: Presidents' Athletic Conference
- Record: 9–2 (8–1 PAC)
- Head coach: Greg Debeljak (16th season)
- Home stadium: DiSanto Field

2019 Presidents' Athletic Conference football standings
| | Conf. | | | Overall |
| Team | W | | L | W | | L |
|---|---|---|---|---|---|---|
| Case Western Reserve $^ | 8 | – | 1 | 9 | – | 2 |
| Grove City | 7 | – | 2 | 9 | – | 2 |
| Carnegie Mellon | 7 | – | 2 | 8 | – | 3 |
| Washington & Jefferson | 6 | – | 3 | 8 | – | 3 |
| Westminster (PA) | 6 | – | 3 | 8 | – | 3 |
| Bethany (WV) | 4 | – | 5 | 4 | – | 6 |
| Geneva | 3 | – | 6 | 3 | – | 7 |
| Saint Vincent | 3 | – | 6 | 3 | – | 7 |
| Waynesburg | 1 | – | 8 | 1 | – | 9 |
| Thiel | 0 | – | 9 | 0 | – | 10 |
$ – Conference champion; ^ – NCAA Division III playoff participant

The 2019 Case Western Reserve Spartans football team represented Case Western Reserve University as a member of the Presidents' Athletic Conference (PAC) during the 2019 NCAA Division III football season. The team was coached by 16th-year coach Greg Debeljak and played its home games at DiSanto Field.

== Schedule ==
| Date | Time | Opponent | Site | Result | Attendance | Source |
|---|---|---|---|---|---|---|
| September 7 | 7:00 pm | at Rochester* | Fauver Stadium; Rochester, NY | W 37–6 | 3,131 | |
| September 21 | 7:00 pm | Grove City | DiSanto Field; Cleveland, OH | W 52–14 | 1,839 | |
| September 28 | 7:00 pm | at Thiel | Alumni Stadium; Greenville, PA | W 37–6 | 675 | |
| October 5 | 7:00 pm | Westminster (PA) | DiSanto Field; Cleveland, OH | W 21–13 | 1,791 | |
| October 12 | 1:30 pm | Washington & Jefferson | DiSanto Field; Cleveland, OH | W 35–19 | 1,965 | |
| October 19 | 1:00 pm | at Saint Vincent | Chuck Noll Field; Latrobe, PA | W 34–26 | 877 | |
| October 26 | 2:00 pm | Geneva | DiSanto Field; Cleveland, OH | W 30–23 | 1,103 | |
| November 2 | 2:00 pm | Bethany (WV) | DiSanto Field; Cleveland, OH | W 35–14 | 1,323 | |
| November 9 | 1:30 pm | at Waynesburg | John F. Wiley Stadium; Waynesburg, PA | W 27–24 | 1,134 | |
| November 16 | 2:00 pm | at Carnegie Mellon | Gesling Stadium; Pittsburgh, PA (Academic Bowl) | L 21–24 | 2,641 | |
| November 23 | 12:00 pm | at No. 13 Union (NY)* | Frank Bailey Field; Schenectady, NY (NCAA Division III First Round) | L 21–24 | 1,005 | |
*Non-conference game; Rankings from D3football.com Poll released prior to the game; All times are in Eastern time
