= Broc Rutter =

American football player (born 1997)

Profile
- Position: Quarterback

Personal information
- Born: April 3, 1997 (age 29); Naperville, Illinois, U.S.
- Listed height: 6 ft 0 in (1.83 m)
- Listed weight: 205 lb (93 kg)

Career information
- High school: Neuqua Valley (Naperville)
- College: North Central
- NFL draft: 2020: undrafted

Career history
- San Francisco 49ers (2020)*; Montreal Alouettes (2021)*
- * Offseason or practice squad member only

Awards and highlights
- NCAA Division III national champion (2019); Gagliardi Trophy (2019); First-team All-American (2019); Second-team All-American (2018); 4× First-team All-CCIW (2016–2019); 3× CCIW Offensive Player of the Year (2016, 2018, 2019)
- Stats at CFL.ca

Broc Rutter (born April 3, 1997) is an American former college football player who was a quarterback at North Central College. He set the NCAA Division III record for career passing yards.

== Early life ==
Broc Rutter was born on April 3, 1997, in Naperville, Illinois. He played high school football, basketball, and baseball at Neuqua Valley High School in Naperville. He became the starting quarterback on the varsity team his junior year. Rutter earned all-area and all-Upstate Eight Valley honors twice each. After missing the early part of his senior year due to injury, Rutter completed 110 of 192 passes (57%) for 1,964 yards and 22 touchdowns.

== College career ==
In 2015, Rutter redshirted for the Indiana State Sycamores of Indiana State University. He then transferred to North Central College, which was only a few minutes from his house. He was a four-year starter for the North Central Cardinals from 2016 to 2019.

Rutter started all 12 games his freshman year in 2016, completing 230 of 351 passes (65.5%) for 3,237 yards and 38 touchdowns while also rushing for three touchdowns. He led the College Conference of Illinois and Wisconsin (CCIW) in completions, completion percentage, passing yards, passing touchdowns, and passer rating (175.87). For the 2016 season, he earned first-team All-CCIW, CCIW Art Keller Offensive Player of the Year, and D3football.com All-North Region second-team honors.

In 2017, Rutter started all 12 games, completing 208 of 332 passes (62.7%) for 2,898 yards and 21 touchdowns while scoring one rushing touchdown. He was named first-team All-CCIW for the second season.

Rutter started all 12 games for the third consecutive year in 2018, recording 269 completions on 385 passing attempts (69.9%) for 3,539 yards, 30 touchdowns, and three interceptions while running for four touchdowns. His completions, passing attempts, and passing yards were all single-season school records. He garnered first-team All-CCIW, CCIW Art Keller Offensive Player of the Year, Associated Press (AP) second-team Little All-American, D3football.com third-team All-America, D3football.com first-team All-North Region, and D3football.com North Region Offensive Player of the Year recognition.

Rutter started all 15 games as a senior in 2019, completing 309 of 435 passes (71.0 percent) for 4,591 yards and 56 touchdowns, which were all single-season school records. He also scored three rushing touchdowns. He led the 2019 Cardinals to an NCAA Division III Football Championship Game victory and a 14–1 overall record. Rutter set Division III career records with 14,265 passing yards and 44 games with 200 or more passing yards. Rutter had a school record 522 passing yards in a 59–52 second round postseason victory over Mount Union. He won the Gagliardi Trophy as the best player in Division III. Other honors he received that year include first-team All-CCIW, CCIW Art Keller Offensive Player of the Year, AP first-team All-American, D3football.com first team All-American, AFCA second-team All-American, D3football.com first-team All-North Region, and D3football.com North Region Offensive Player of the Year. He also punted nine times during the playoffs for a 43.8 yard average. Rutter majored in marketing at North Central.

== Professional career ==
After his senior year, Rutter played in the Hula Bowl all-star game and threw a touchdown. He participated in drills at both Northern Illinois and Northwestern's pro days. After going undrafted in the 2020 NFL draft, Rutter signed with the San Francisco 49ers on April 28, 2020. He received a signing bonus of only $279 as that was all the 49ers had left to spend on undrafted free agents. His agent, Mike McCartney, said Rutter "better frame [the check because] it might be the smallest ever." He was waived on July 27, the day before the start of training camp.

Rutter signed with the Montreal Alouettes of the Canadian Football League (CFL) on January 19, 2021. He was released on July 28 before the start of the 2021 CFL season.
