= 2019 Wartburg Knights football team =

American college football season

2019 Wartburg Knights football

ARC co-champion

NCAA Division III Second Round, L 28–41 at Wisconsin–Whitewater
- Conference: American Rivers Conference

Ranking
- AFCA: No. 13
- D3Football.com: No. 14
- Record: 10–2 (7–1 ARC)
- Head coach: Rick Willis (21st season)
- Offensive coordinator: Matt Wheeler (10th season)
- Defensive coordinator: Chris Winter (9th season)
- Home stadium: Walston-Hoover Stadium

2019 American Rivers Conference football standings
	Conf.			Overall
Team	W		L	W		L
No. 17 Central (IA) +^	7	–	1	10	–	2
No. 14 Wartburg +^	7	–	1	10	–	2
Dubuque	6	–	2	7	–	3
Coe	5	–	3	6	–	4
Loras	4	–	4	5	–	5
Simpson (IA)	4	–	4	5	–	5
Buena Vista	1	–	7	3	–	7
Nebraska Wesleyan	1	–	7	3	–	7
Luther	1	–	7	1	–	9
+ – Conference co-champions; ^ – NCAA Division III playoff participant; Rankings from D3football.com

The 2019 Wartburg Knights football team represented Wartburg College as a member of the American Rivers Conference (ARC) during the 2019 NCAA Division III football season. Led by Rick Willis in his 21st season, the Knights compiled an overall record of 10–2 with a mark of 7–1 in conference play, sharing the ARC title with the Central Dutch and earning an at-large bid to the NCAA Division III Football Championship playoffs. There, the Knights defeated Hope in the first round before losing to eventual national runner-up, Wisconsin–Whitewater, in the second round. The team played home games at Walston-Hoover Stadium in Waverly, Iowa.

== Schedule ==
Wartburg's 2019 regular season scheduled consisted of five home and five away games.

Date	Time	Opponent	Rank	Site	Result	Attendance
September 7	1:00 p.m.	at Greenville*		Francis Field; Greenville, IL	W 60–21	500
September 14	7:00 p.m.	Monmouth (IL)*		Walston-Hoover Stadium; Waverly, IA	W 38–9	1,323
September 21	1:00 p.m.	at Luther		Carlson Stadium; Decorah, IA	W 62–10	1,105
September 28	1:00 p.m.	Dubuque	No. 20	Walston-Hoover Stadium; Waverly, IA	W 42–25	2,450
October 5	1:00 p.m.	at Buena Vista	No. 20	J. Leslie Rollins Stadium and Peterson Field; Storm Lake, IA	W 48–27	320
October 12	1:30 p.m.	Nebraska Wesleyan^{†}	No. 18	Walston-Hoover Stadium; Waverly, IA	W 61–7	4,325
October 19	1:00 p.m.	at Simpson	No. 14	Buxton Stadium; Indianola, IA	W 29–15	4,100
November 2	1:00 p.m.	at Coe	No. 12	Walston-Hoover Stadium; Waverly, IA	W 21–7	2,535
November 9	1:00 p.m.	at Central (IA)	No. 11	Schipper Stadium; Pella, IA	L 56–57 ^{OT}	3,000
November 16	1:00 p.m.	Loras	No. 24	Walston-Hoover Stadium; Waverly, IA	W 48–7	1,500
November 23	12:00 p.m.	at Hope*	No. 22	Ray & Sue Smith Stadium; Holland, Michigan (NCAA Division III First Round)	W 41–3	2,384
November 30	12:00 p.m.	at No. 7 Wisconsin–Whitewater*	No. 22	Perkins Stadium; Whitewater, WI (NCAA Division III Second Round)	L 28–41	516
*Non-conference game; ^{†}Homecoming; Rankings from D3Football.com Poll released prior to the game; All times are in Central time

== Awards and honors ==
Individual awards
Player	Award
Nic Vetter	AFCA 1st team All-American; AP 1st team All-American

All-Conference
Player	Position	Team	Year
JoJo McNair	DB	1	Jr
Jason Fisher	DL	1	SR
Antonio Santillan	LB	1	So
Kolin Schulte	WR	1	SR
Nic Vetter	OL	1	SR
Eli Barrett	DB	2	SR
Cedric Dobbins	DB	2	SR
Noah Dodd	QB	2	SR
Ethan Lape	OL	2	JR
John Patrick	OL	2	SR
Hunter Clasen	RB	HM	FR
HM = Honorable mention. Reference:
