= Blanchet Catholic School =

Location
- 4373 Market Street NE; Salem, Marion County, Oregon 97301; United States; 44.951793°N 122.977926°W

Information
- Type: Private, Coeducational
- Motto: "By Courage and Faith"
- Religious affiliation: Roman Catholic
- Established: 1995
- Principal: Robin Smith
- Staff: 40
- Grades: 6–12
- Enrollment: 314 (2020-2021)
- Colors: Royal blue, silver and white
- Athletics conference: OSAA Tri-River Conference 2A-3
- Mascot: Cavaliers
- Rival: Salem Academy and Western Christian
- Accreditation: Northwest Accreditation Commission
- Website: http://blanchetcatholicschool.com/
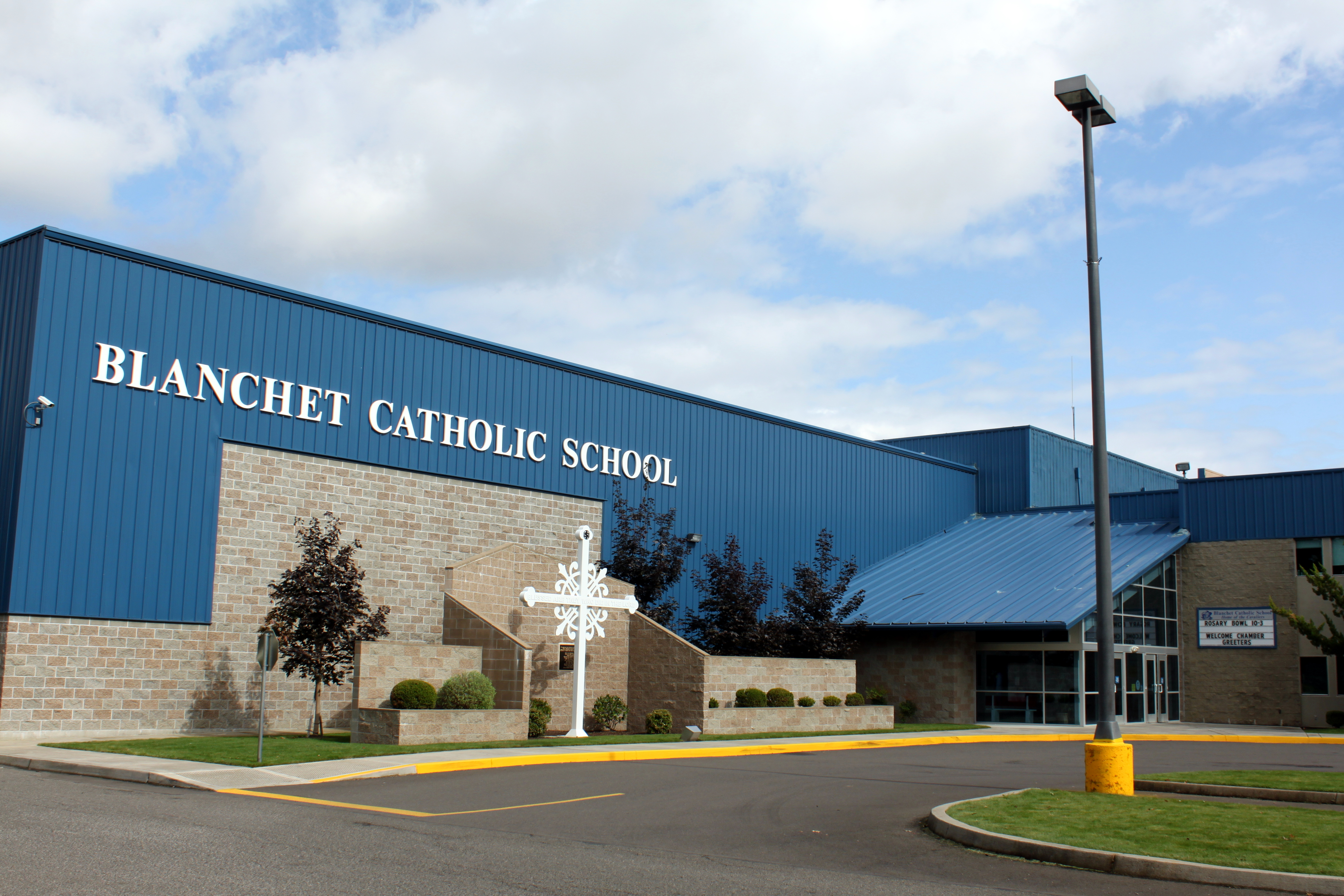

Blanchet Catholic School (BCS) is a private Catholic high school and middle school in Salem, Oregon, United States. Blanchet's school colors are royal blue and white.

== History ==
Blanchet was founded in 1995 after the tradition of two former Catholic secondary schools in Salem, Sacred Heart Academy (1863 to 1984) and Serra Catholic (1954 to 1969). It serves grades 7–12, and serves 6th grade as of Fall of 2009. As of 2022, the school continues to offer enrollment of grades 6–12.

The school was named after Archbishop François Norbert Blanchet, the first Archbishop of the Oregon Territory. The school operates by permission of the Roman Catholic Archdiocese of Portland and is not owned by a religious institute.

== Academic program ==
Blanchet has been accredited through Northwest Accreditation Commission since 1995.

== Sports ==
Mid-High Sports Mid-High sports at Blanchet include the following: Soccer (Coed,) Football, Track & Field, Volleyball (8th Grade,) Volleyball (6/7th grade,) Basketball (6/7/8th Grade,) Softball, and Baseball.

High School Sports High school sports at Blanchet include: Cross Country (Varsity,) Football (JV & Varsity,) Volleyball (Girls JV2, JV, & Varsity,) Soccer (Boys Varsity,) Soccer (Girls Varsity,) Basketball (Boys JV, & Varsity,) Basketball (Girls JV & Varsity,) Swimming, Baseball (JV & Varsity,) Softball (Varsity,) Golf (Mens Varsity,) Golf (Girls Varsity,) and Track & Field (Varsity.)

== Athletics ==
Blanchet Catholic School competes with other school teams in the PacWest Conference through the OSAA, (Oregon Schools Activities Assoc.)

== Notable alumni ==
- Ben Bartch, professional football guard in the NFL
