= 2019 NCAA Division III football season =

American college football season

- Total No. of teams: 247
- Regular season: September 5 – November 16, 2019
- Playoffs: November 23 – December 21, 2019
- National championship: Woodforest Bank Stadium; Shenandoah, TX; December 21, 2019
- Champion: North Central (IL)
- Gagliardi Trophy: Broc Rutter (QB), North Central (IL)

The 2019 NCAA Division III football season is the component of the 2019 college football season organized by the NCAA at the Division III level in the United States. The regular season began on September 5 and culminated on November 16.

The season's playoffs ended with the NCAA Division III Football Championship (also known as the Stagg Bowl) at Woodforest Bank Stadium in Shenandoah, Texas, hosted by the University of Mary Hardin–Baylor.

The annual Cortaca Jug game between Ithaca and Cortland on November 16 was moved to MetLife Stadium in honor of the 150th anniversary of college football. It became the most-attended game in Division III history, with 45,161 fans watching Ithaca defeat Cortland 32–20.

== Conference changes and new programs ==
=== Membership changes ===
School	Former conference	New conference
Buffalo State Bengals	Empire 8	Liberty League
Earlham Quakers	HCAC	Suspended program
Thomas More Saints	Independent	Mid-South (NAIA)
Frostburg State Bobcats	NJAC	Mountain East (D-II)
Husson Eagles	ECFC	Commonwealth Coast
Southern Virginia Knights	NJAC	ODAC

Belhaven completed its transition to Division III and became eligible for the postseason.

== Conference standings ==
2019 American Rivers Conference football standings
	Conf.			Overall
Team	W		L	W		L
No. 17 Central (IA) +^	7	–	1	10	–	2
No. 14 Wartburg +^	7	–	1	10	–	2
Dubuque	6	–	2	7	–	3
Coe	5	–	3	6	–	4
Loras	4	–	4	5	–	5
Simpson (IA)	4	–	4	5	–	5
Buena Vista	1	–	7	3	–	7
Nebraska Wesleyan	1	–	7	3	–	7
Luther	1	–	7	1	–	9
+ – Conference co-champions; ^ – NCAA Division III playoff participant; Rankings from D3football.com

2019 American Southwest Conference football standings
	Conf.			Overall
Team	W		L	W		L
No. 6 Mary Hardin–Baylor $^	9	–	0	12	–	1
Texas Lutheran	8	–	1	8	–	2
No. 21 Hardin–Simmons	7	–	2	8	–	2
East Texas Baptist	6	–	3	6	–	4
Howard Payne	4	–	5	5	–	5
Southwestern (TX)	3	–	6	4	–	6
Louisiana College	3	–	6	3	–	7
Sul Ross	3	–	6	3	–	7
Belhaven	2	–	7	2	–	8
McMurry	0	–	9	0	–	10
$ – Conference champion; ^ – NCAA Division III playoff participant; Rankings from D3football.com

2019 Centennial Conference football standings
	Conf.			Overall
Team	W		L	W		L
No. 7 Muhlenberg $^	9	–	0	13	–	1
No. 16 Susquehanna	8	–	1	10	–	1
Johns Hopkins	6	–	3	8	–	3
Franklin & Marshall	5	–	4	7	–	4
Dickinson	4	–	5	5	–	5
Ursinus	4	–	5	5	–	5
Moravian	4	–	5	4	–	6
McDaniel	2	–	7	3	–	7
Juniata	2	–	7	2	–	8
Gettysburg	1	–	8	1	–	9
$ – Conference champion; ^ – NCAA Division III playoff participant; Rankings from D3football.com

2019 College Conference of Illinois and Wisconsin football standings
	Conf.			Overall
Team	W		L	W		L
No. 5 Wheaton (IL) $^	9	–	0	12	–	1
No. 1 North Central (IL) ^	8	–	1	14	–	1
Washington University	6	–	3	7	–	3
Illinois Wesleyan	6	–	3	6	–	4
Augustana (IL)	5	–	4	6	–	4
Millikin	4	–	5	5	–	5
Carthage	4	–	5	4	–	6
Carroll (WI)	1	–	8	2	–	8
Elmhurst	1	–	8	1	–	9
North Park	1	–	8	1	–	9
$ – Conference champion; ^ – NCAA Division III playoff participant; Rankings from D3football.com

2019 Commonwealth Coast Conference football standings
	Conf.			Overall
Team	W		L	W		L
Western New England $^	7	–	0	9	–	2
Endicott	6	–	1	9	–	2
Nichols	4	–	3	6	–	4
Husson	4	–	3	4	–	6
Salve Regina	3	–	4	4	–	6
New England	2	–	5	4	–	6
Curry	2	–	5	2	–	8
Becker	0	–	7	2	–	8
$ – Conference champion; ^ – NCAA Division III playoff participant

2019 Eastern Collegiate Football Conference standings
	Conf.			Overall
Team	W		L	W		L
Dean $#	4	–	1	4	–	6
SUNY Maritime ^	3	–	2	5	–	6
Alfred State	2	–	3	3	–	6
Gallaudet	2	–	3	2	–	6
Castleton	2	–	3	2	–	7
Anna Maria	2	–	3	2	–	8
$ – Conference champion; ^ – NCAA Division III playoff participant; # – Provisional Division III member

2019 Empire 8 Athletic Conference football standings
	Conf.			Overall
Team	W		L	W		L
No. 25 Brockport +^	5	–	1	9	–	3
Cortland +	5	–	1	8	–	3
Morrisville State	4	–	2	6	–	5
Utica	3	–	3	5	–	5
Alfred	2	–	4	5	–	5
St. John Fisher	2	–	4	5	–	5
Hartwick	0	–	6	1	–	9
+ – Conference co-champions; ^ – NCAA Division III playoff participant; Rankings from D3football.com

2019 Heartland Collegiate Athletic Conference football standings
	Conf.			Overall
Team	W		L	W		L
Hanover $^	7	–	0	9	–	2
Mount St. Joseph	5	–	2	7	–	3
Rose–Hulman	5	–	2	6	–	4
Franklin (IN)	4	–	3	5	–	5
Manchester	3	–	4	4	–	6
Bluffton	2	–	5	2	–	8
Anderson (IN)	1	–	6	3	–	7
Defiance	1	–	6	1	–	9
$ – Conference champion; ^ – NCAA Division III playoff participant

2019 Liberty League football standings
	Conf.			Overall
Team	W		L	W		L
No. 12 Union (NY) $^	6	–	0	11	–	1
Hobart	4	–	2	9	–	2
Ithaca	4	–	2	8	–	3
RPI	3	–	3	6	–	5
St. Lawrence	3	–	3	5	–	5
Buffalo State	1	–	5	1	–	9
Rochester (NY)	0	–	6	0	–	10
$ – Conference champion; ^ – NCAA Division III playoff participant; Rankings from D3football.com

2019 Massachusetts State Collegiate Athletic Conference football standings
	Conf.			Overall
Team	W		L	W		L
Framingham State $^	8	–	0	8	–	3
Western Connecticut	6	–	2	8	–	3
Bridgewater State	6	–	2	6	–	4
UMass Dartmouth	5	–	3	7	–	3
Massachusetts Maritime	4	–	4	6	–	4
Plymouth State	4	–	4	6	–	4
Westfield State	2	–	6	2	–	8
Fitchburg State	1	–	7	2	–	8
Worcester State	0	–	8	0	–	10
$ – Conference champion; ^ – NCAA Division III playoff participant

2019 Michigan Intercollegiate Athletic Association football standings
	Conf.			Overall
Team	W		L	W		L
Hope $^	7	–	0	9	–	2
Albion	5	–	2	8	–	2
Olivet	5	–	2	8	–	2
Alma	4	–	3	6	–	4
Adrian	4	–	3	5	–	5
Trine	2	–	5	5	–	5
Kalamazoo	1	–	6	2	–	8
Finlandia	0	–	7	0	–	10
$ – Conference champion; ^ – NCAA Division III playoff participant

2019 Middle Atlantic Conference football standings
	Conf.			Overall
Team	W		L	W		L
No. 8 Delaware Valley $^	8	–	0	11	–	2
Stevenson	7	–	1	8	–	3
Wilkes	6	–	2	8	–	3
Misericordia	5	–	3	5	–	5
Widener	4	–	4	5	–	5
King's (PA)	3	–	5	5	–	5
Lycoming	3	–	5	4	–	6
Lebanon Valley	3	–	5	3	–	7
FDU Florham	2	–	6	3	–	7
Albright	2	–	6	2	–	8
Alvernia	1	–	7	2	–	8
$ – Conference champion; ^ – NCAA Division III playoff participant; Rankings from D3football.com

2019 Midwest Conference football standings
	Conf.			Overall
Team	W		L	W		L
North
St. Norbert xy	5	–	0	6	–	3
Lake Forest	4	–	1	7	–	3
Ripon	3	–	2	4	–	6
Macalester	2	–	3	4	–	6
Beloit	1	–	4	1	–	9
Lawrence	0	–	5	1	–	8
South
Monmouth (IL) xy$^	4	–	0	7	–	3
Chicago	3	–	1	6	–	3
Illinois College	2	–	2	6	–	3
Cornell (IA)	1	–	3	4	–	5
Knox	0	–	4	3	–	6
Grinnell *	0	–	0	0	–	3
Championship: Monmouth 10, St. Norbert 7
$ – Conference champion; x – Division champion/co-champions; y – Championship game participant; ^ – NCAA Division III playoff participant; * – Grinnell canceled seven games, including all five divisional games.

2019 Minnesota Intercollegiate Athletic Conference football standings
	Conf.			Overall
Team	W		L	W		L
No. 4 Saint John's (MN) +^	7	–	1	12	–	2
No. 15 St. Thomas (MN) +	7	–	1	8	–	2
No. 23 Bethel (MN)	6	–	2	8	–	2
Gustavus Adolphus	5	–	3	7	–	3
Concordia–Moorhead	5	–	3	5	–	5
St. Olaf	3	–	5	5	–	5
Carleton	2	–	6	4	–	6
Augsburg	1	–	7	2	–	8
Hamline	0	–	8	1	–	9
+ – Conference co-champions; ^ – NCAA Division III playoff participant; Rankings from D3football.com

2019 New England Small College Athletic Conference football standings
	Conf.			Overall
Team	W		L	W		L
Middlebury $	9	–	0	9	–	0
Wesleyan	8	–	1	8	–	1
Williams	7	–	2	7	–	2
Trinity (CT)	5	–	4	5	–	4
Amherst	4	–	5	4	–	5
Hamilton	4	–	5	4	–	5
Tufts	4	–	5	4	–	5
Bates	2	–	7	2	–	7
Colby	2	–	7	2	–	7
Bowdoin	0	–	9	0	–	9
$ – Conference champion

2019 New England Women's and Men's Athletic Conference football standings
	Conf.			Overall
Team	W		L	W		L
WPI +	6	–	1	10	–	1
MIT +^	6	–	1	7	–	3
Merchant Marine	5	–	2	6	–	3
Springfield	5	–	2	6	–	4
Coast Guard	2	–	5	5	–	5
Norwich	2	–	5	5	–	5
Catholic University	2	–	5	2	–	8
Maine Maritime	0	–	7	0	–	10
+ – Conference co-champions; ^ – NCAA Division III playoff participant

2019 New Jersey Athletic Conference football standings
	Conf.			Overall
Team	W		L	W		L
No. 9 Salisbury $^	7	–	0	11	–	1
No. 11 Wesley ^	6	–	1	10	–	2
Montclair State	5	–	2	6	–	4
Rowan	4	–	3	4	–	6
Kean	2	–	5	3	–	7
Christopher Newport	2	–	5	2	–	8
TCNJ	2	–	5	2	–	8
William Paterson	0	–	7	2	–	8
$ – Conference champion; ^ – NCAA Division III playoff participant; Rankings from D3football.com

2019 North Coast Athletic Conference football standings
	Conf.			Overall
Team	W		L	W		L
Denison +	7	–	2	8	–	2
Wittenberg +	7	–	2	7	–	3
Wabash +^	7	–	2	7	–	4
Ohio Wesleyan	6	–	3	7	–	3
DePauw	6	–	3	6	–	4
Wooster	5	–	4	6	–	4
Allegheny	4	–	5	4	–	6
Kenyon	2	–	7	3	–	7
Oberlin	1	–	8	1	–	9
Hiram	0	–	9	0	–	10
+ – Conference co-champions; ^ – NCAA Division III playoff participant

2019 Northern Athletics Collegiate Conference football standings
	Conf.			Overall
Team	W		L	W		L
No. 24 Aurora $^	7	–	0	9	–	2
Benedictine (IL)	6	–	1	7	–	3
Eureka	4	–	3	6	–	4
Concordia (IL)	3	–	4	5	–	5
Concordia (WI)	3	–	4	5	–	5
Lakeland	3	–	4	4	–	6
Wisconsin Lutheran	2	–	5	2	–	8
Rockford	0	–	7	1	–	9
$ – Conference champion; ^ – NCAA Division III playoff participant; Rankings from D3football.com

2019 Northwest Conference football standings
	Conf.			Overall
Team	W		L	W		L
No. 19 Linfield $^	7	–	0	8	–	2
Whitworth	5	–	2	6	–	3
Puget Sound	4	–	3	6	–	4
George Fox	4	–	3	5	–	5
Pacific (OR)	4	–	3	4	–	6
Lewis & Clark	3	–	4	4	–	5
Pacific Lutheran	1	–	6	2	–	7
Willamette	0	–	7	1	–	8
$ – Conference champion; ^ – NCAA Division III playoff participant; Rankings from D3football.com

2019 Ohio Athletic Conference football standings
	Conf.			Overall
Team	W		L	W		L
No. 3 Mount Union $^	9	–	0	11	–	1
No. 13 John Carroll	8	–	1	9	–	1
Baldwin Wallace	6	–	3	7	–	3
Ohio Northern	6	–	3	6	–	4
Heidelberg	5	–	4	6	–	4
Marietta	4	–	5	5	–	5
Wilmington (OH)	3	–	6	3	–	7
Muskingum	2	–	7	3	–	7
Otterbein	2	–	7	2	–	8
Capital	0	–	9	0	–	10
$ – Conference champion; ^ – NCAA Division III playoff participant; Rankings from D3football.com

2019 Old Dominion Athletic Conference football standings
	Conf.			Overall
Team	W		L	W		L
No. 20 Bridgewater $^	8	–	0	10	–	1
Randolph–Macon	7	–	1	9	–	2
Emory & Henry	6	–	2	8	–	3
Washington and Lee	5	–	3	6	–	4
Shenandoah	4	–	4	6	–	4
Ferrum	3	–	5	4	–	6
Southern Virginia	2	–	6	4	–	6
Guilford	1	–	7	2	–	8
Hampden–Sydney	0	–	8	1	–	9
$ – Conference champion; ^ – NCAA Division III playoff participant; Rankings from D3football.com

2019 Presidents' Athletic Conference football standings
	Conf.			Overall
Team	W		L	W		L
Case Western Reserve $^	8	–	1	9	–	2
Grove City	7	–	2	9	–	2
Carnegie Mellon	7	–	2	8	–	3
Washington & Jefferson	6	–	3	8	–	3
Westminster (PA)	6	–	3	8	–	3
Bethany (WV)	4	–	5	4	–	6
Geneva	3	–	6	3	–	7
Saint Vincent	3	–	6	3	–	7
Waynesburg	1	–	8	1	–	9
Thiel	0	–	9	0	–	10
$ – Conference champion; ^ – NCAA Division III playoff participant

2019 Southern Athletic Association football standings
	Conf.			Overall
Team	W		L	W		L
Berry +^	7	–	1	9	–	2
Trinity (TX) +	7	–	1	8	–	2
Birmingham–Southern	6	–	2	7	–	3
Hendrix	5	–	3	7	–	3
Austin	4	–	4	5	–	5
Centre	3	–	5	5	–	5
Millsaps	3	–	5	5	–	5
Rhodes	1	–	7	1	–	9
Sewanee	0	–	8	0	–	10
+ – Conference co-champions; ^ – NCAA Division III playoff participant

2019 Southern California Intercollegiate Athletic Conference football standings
	Conf.			Overall
Team	W		L	W		L
No. 10 Chapman $^	7	–	0	10	–	1
No. 18 Redlands ^	6	–	1	9	–	2
Pomona-Pitzer	4	–	3	5	–	4
Cal Lutheran	4	–	3	5	–	5
Claremont-Mudd-Scripps	3	–	4	5	–	5
La Verne	3	–	4	4	–	6
Whittier	1	–	6	2	–	8
Occidental	0	–	7	0	–	8
$ – Conference champion; ^ – NCAA Division III playoff participant; Rankings from D3football.com

2019 Upper Midwest Athletic Conference football standings
	Conf.			Overall
Team	W		L	W		L
Martin Luther $^	8	–	0	9	–	2
Greenville	7	–	1	8	–	3
St. Scholastica	5	–	3	7	–	3
MacMurray	5	–	3	5	–	5
Northwestern (MN)	4	–	4	4	–	6
Westminster (MO)	4	–	4	4	–	6
Crown	2	–	6	3	–	7
Minnesota–Morris	1	–	7	1	–	9
Iowa Wesleyan	0	–	8	0	–	10
$ – Conference champion; ^ – NCAA Division III playoff participant

2019 USA South Athletic Conference football standings
	Conf.			Overall
Team	W		L	W		L
Huntingdon $^	6	–	1	8	–	4
Brevard #	5	–	2	8	–	2
Averett	5	–	2	7	–	3
North Carolina Wesleyan	5	–	2	6	–	4
Methodist	3	–	4	4	–	6
Maryville (TN)	3	–	4	3	–	7
LaGrange	1	–	6	3	–	7
Greensboro	0	–	7	1	–	9
$ – Conference champion; ^ – NCAA Division III playoff participant; # – Provisional Division III member

2019 Wisconsin Intercollegiate Athletic Conference football standings
	Conf.			Overall
Team	W		L	W		L
No. 2 Wisconsin–Whitewater +^	6	–	1	13	–	2
No. 22 Wisconsin–Oshkosh +^	6	–	1	8	–	3
Wisconsin–La Crosse	5	–	2	7	–	3
Wisconsin–Platteville	4	–	3	7	–	3
Wisconsin–Stout	3	–	4	4	–	6
Wisconsin–Stevens Point	2	–	5	3	–	7
Wisconsin–Eau Claire	1	–	6	3	–	7
Wisconsin–River Falls	1	–	6	2	–	8
+ – Conference co-champions; ^ – NCAA Division III playoff participant; Rankings from D3football.com

== Postseason ==
Twenty-seven conferences met the requirements for an automatic ("Pool A") bid to the playoffs.

There were no "Pool B" bids this year, slots normally allocated to schools not in a Pool A conference.

The remaining five playoff spots were at-large ("Pool C") teams.

=== Qualified teams ===
==== Automatic bids (27) ====
Conference	Team	Appearance	Last
American Southwest Conference	Mary Hardin–Baylor	18th	2018
American Rivers Conference	Central (IA)	21st	2009
Centennial Conference	Muhlenberg	9th	2018
College Conference of Illinois and Wisconsin	Wheaton (IL)	11th	2016
Commonwealth Coast Football	Western New England	6th	2018
Eastern Collegiate Football Conference	SUNY Maritime	2nd	2010
Empire 8	Brockport	7th	2018
Heartland Collegiate Athletic Conference	Hanover	8th	2018
Liberty League	Union (NY)	12th	2006
Massachusetts State Collegiate Athletic Conference	Framingham State	5th	2018
Michigan Intercollegiate Athletic Association	Hope	5th	2006
Middle Atlantic Conference	Delaware Valley	9th	2018
Midwest Conference	Monmouth (IL)	7th	2017
Minnesota Intercollegiate Athletic Conference	Saint John's (MN)	26th	2018
New England Women's and Men's Athletic Conference	MIT	3rd	2018
New Jersey Athletic Conference	Salisbury	11th	2015
North Coast Athletic Conference	Wabash	10th	2015
Northern Athletics Collegiate Conference	Aurora (IL)	5th	2008
Northwest Conference	Linfield	15th	2017
Ohio Athletic Conference	Mount Union	31st	2018
Old Dominion Athletic Conference	Bridgewater (VA)	7th	2005
Presidents' Athletic Conference	Case Western Reserve	5th	2017
Southern Athletic Association	Berry	3rd	2018
Southern California Intercollegiate Athletic Conference	Chapman	3rd	2017
Upper Midwest Athletic Conference	Martin Luther	2nd	2018
USA South Athletic Conference	Huntingdon	5th	2017
Wisconsin Intercollegiate Athletic Conference	Wisconsin–Oshkosh	5th	2017

==== At-large bids (5) ====
Team	Conference	Appearance	Last
North Central (IL)	CCIW	12th	2018
Redlands	SCIAC	9th	2016
Wartburg	ARC	14th	2018
Wesley	NJAC	15th	2017
Wisconsin–Whitewater	WIAC	17th	2018

=== Playoff bracket ===
First round November 23
*	Mary Hardin–Baylor	43
Redlands	14
*	Berry	24
Huntingdon	27
*	Wisconsin–Whitewater	35
Monmouth (IL)	10
*	Hope	3
Wartburg	41
*	Wheaton (IL)	51
Martin Luther	7
*	Central (IA)	38^{†}
Wisconsin–Oshkosh	37
*	Chapman	68^{†††}
Linfield	65
*	Saint John's (MN)	51
Aurora	47
*	Salisbury	83
SUNY Maritime	0
*	Union (NY)	24
Case Western Reserve	21
*	Muhlenberg	38
MIT	0
*	Western New England	28
Brockport	33
*	Mount Union	65
Hanover	14
*	North Central (IL)	51
Wabash	15
*	Wesley	58
Framingham State	21
*	Bridgewater (VA)	22
Delaware Valley	30

Second round November 30
*	Mary Hardin–Baylor	42
Huntingdon	6
*	Wisconsin–Whitewater	41
Wartburg	28
*	Wheaton (IL)	49
Central (IA)	13
*	Chapman	26
Saint John's (MN)	55
*	Salisbury	62
Union (NY)	41
*	Muhlenberg	42
Brockport	0
*	Mount Union	52
North Central (IL)	59
*	Wesley	10
Delaware Valley	45

Quarterfinals; December 7
*	Mary Hardin–Baylor	7
Wisconsin–Whitewater	26
*	Wheaton (IL)	33
Saint John's (MN)	34
*	Salisbury	8
Muhlenberg	24
*	North Central (IL)	31
Delaware Valley	14

Semifinals; December 14
*	Wisconsin–Whitewater	35
Saint John's (MN)	32
*	Muhlenberg	14
North Central (IL)	45

Championship; Stagg Bowl; December 20; Shenandoah, Texas
*	Wisconsin–Whitewater	14
North Central (IL)	41

== See also ==
- 2019 NCAA Division I FBS football season
- 2019 NCAA Division I FCS football season
- 2019 NCAA Division II football season
- 2019 NAIA football season
