= 2019 Saint John's Johnnies football team =

American college football season

2019 Saint John's Johnnies football

MIAC co-champion
- Conference: Minnesota Intercollegiate Athletic Conference

Ranking
- AFCA: No. 8
- D3Football.com: No. 4
- Record: 12–2 ( MIAC)
- Head coach: Gary Fasching (7th season)
- Offensive coordinator: Kole Heckendorf (2nd season)
- Defensive coordinator: Jerry Haugen (44th season)
- Home stadium: Clemens Stadium

2019 Minnesota Intercollegiate Athletic Conference football standings
	Conf.			Overall
Team	W		L	W		L
No. 4 Saint John's (MN) +^	7	–	1	12	–	2
No. 15 St. Thomas (MN) +	7	–	1	8	–	2
No. 23 Bethel (MN)	6	–	2	8	–	2
Gustavus Adolphus	5	–	3	7	–	3
Concordia–Moorhead	5	–	3	5	–	5
St. Olaf	3	–	5	5	–	5
Carleton	2	–	6	4	–	6
Augsburg	1	–	7	2	–	8
Hamline	0	–	8	1	–	9
+ – Conference co-champions; ^ – NCAA Division III playoff participant; Rankings from D3football.com

The 2019 Saint John's Johnnies football team represented Saint John's University in the 2019 NCAA Division III football season. The Johnnies, led by seventh-year head coach Gary Fasching, were members of the Minnesota Intercollegiate Athletic Conference (MIAC) and played their home games at Clemens Stadium in Collegeville, Minnesota.

The Jonnies compiled a 12–2 record (7–1 in conference games).

== Schedule ==
Saint John's 2019 schedule consisted of 5 home, 4 away, and 1 neutral-site game in the regular season. The Johnnies hosted Gustavus Adolphus, Augsburg, Bethel, Concordia-Moorhead, and Rose-Hulman. Away games were at Wisconsin–Stout, Carleton, St. Olaf, and Hamline. The rivalry game against St. Thomas was held at neutral-site Allianz Field in St. Paul.

Date	Time	Opponent	Rank	Site	TV	Result	Attendance
September 7	1:00 p.m.	at Wisconsin–Stout*	No. 3	Williams Stadium; Menomonie, WI		W 14–7	3,457
September 21	1:00 p.m.	Gustavus Adolphus	No. 4	Clemens Stadium; Collegeville, MN (Family Weekend)		W 33–21	8,290
September 28	1:00 p.m.	at Carleton	No. 4	Laird Stadium; Northfield, <MN		W 56–10	714
October 5	1:00 p.m.	Augsburg^{†}	No. 4	Clemens Stadium; Collegeville, MN		W 61–6	4,925
October 12	1:00 p.m.	No. 6 Bethel (MN)	No. 4	Clemens Stadium; Collegeville, MN (Tackle Cancer)		W 19–0	5,171
October 19	1:10 p.m.	vs. No. 11 St. Thomas (MN)	No. 4	Allianz Field; St. Paul, MN (Johnnie-Tommie)		W 38–20	19,508
October 26	1:00 p.m.	at St. Olaf	No. 4	Klein Field at Manitou; Northfield, MN		W 54–17	2,714
November 2	1:00 p.m.	Concordia–Moorhead	No. 4	Clemens Stadium; Collegeville, MN		L 18–19	5,381
November 9	1:00 p.m.	at Hamline	No. 8	Klas Field; St. Paul, MN		W 70–0	507
November 16	1:00 p.m.	Rose–Hulman*	No. 8	Clemens Stadium; Collegeville, MN		W 47–14	3,818
November 23	12:00 p.m.	Aurora*	No. 8	Clemens Stadium; Collegeville, MN (NCAA Division IIIFirst Round)		W 51–47	2,262
November 30	2:00 p.m.	at No. 12 Chapman*	No. 8	Ernie Chapman Stadium; Orange, CA (NCAA Division III Second Round)		W 55–26	1,724
December 7	12:00 p.m.	at No. 3 Wheaton (IL)*	No. 8	McCully Stadium; Wheaton, IL (NCAA Division III Quarterfinal)		W 34–33	1,508
December 14	2:00 p.m.	at No. 7 Wisconsin–Whitewater*	No. 8	Perkins Stadium; Whitewater, WI (NCAA Division III Semifinal)	ESPN3	L 32–35	2,830
*Non-conference game; ^{†}Homecoming; Rankings from D3Football.com Poll released prior to the game; All times are in Central time; Source:

== Players drafted into the NFL ==
Round	Pick	Player	Position	NFL Club
4	116	Ben Bartch	OL	Jacksonville Jaguars

After moving from tight end to offensive tackle, Ben Bartch began to attract attention from NFL scouts for his performance. After the 2019 season, he was invited to take part in the 2020 Senior Bowl, the only Division III player invited. After performing well there and at the NFL Combine, Bartch was selected by the Jacksonville Jaguars in the fourth round of the 2020 NFL draft. He became the first player from Saint John's to be drafted since 1974.

== Rankings ==
Ranking movements Legend: ██ Increase in ranking ██ Decrease in ranking
	Week												
Poll	Pre	1	2	3	4	5	6	7	8	9	10	11	Final
D3football.com	3	4	4	4	4	4	4	4	4	8	8	8	4
AFCA	Not released												
