= Shenandoah, Texas =

City in Montgomery County, Texas, United States

- City
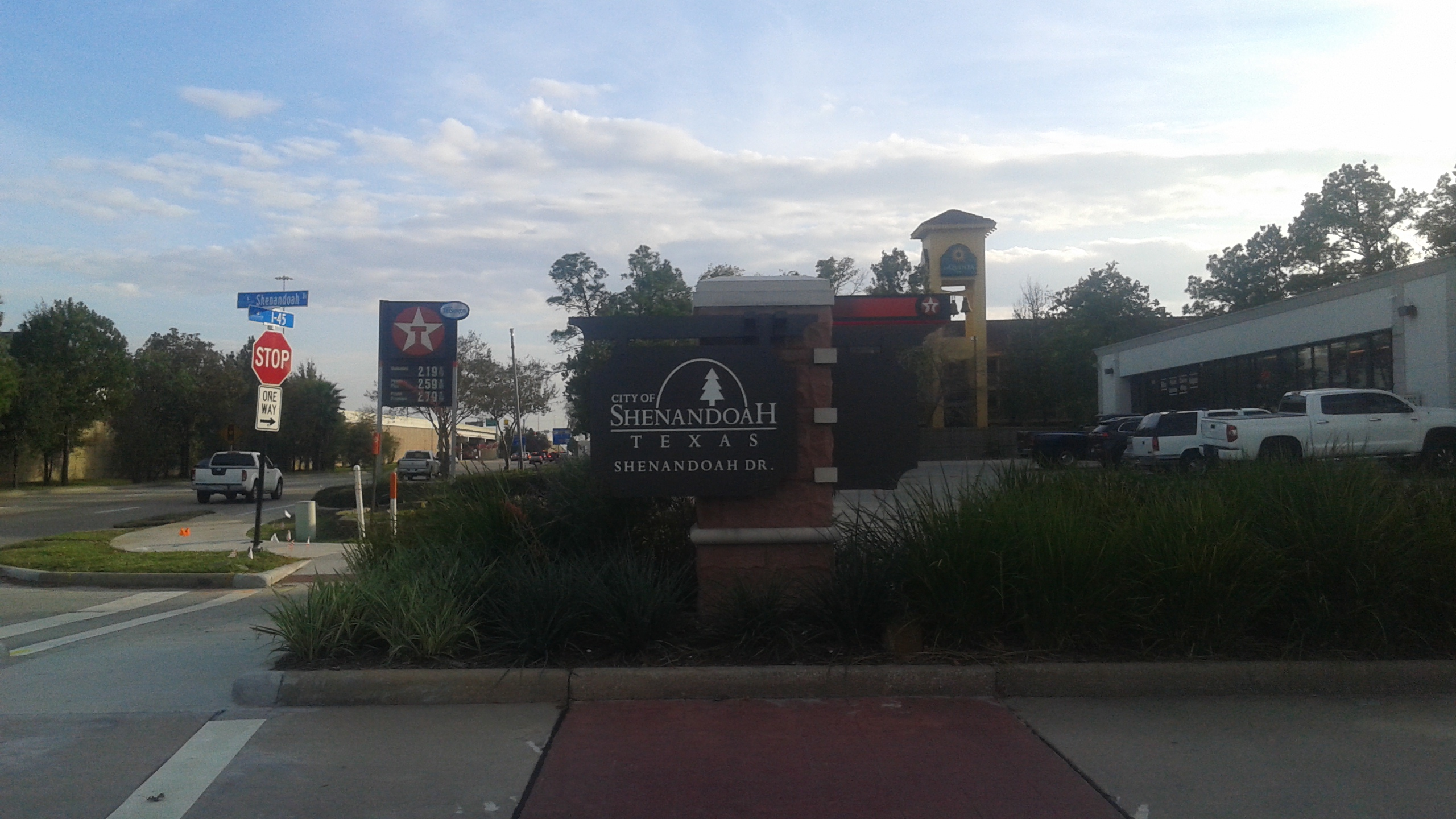
- Welcome sign located at the entrance at Shenandoah Drive and I-45

- Shenandoah within Montgomery County

- Location in Texas Location in the United States
- Coordinates: 30°10′52″N 95°27′30″W
- Country: United States
- State: Texas
- Counties: Montgomery

Government
  - Mayor: John Escoto
  - City Council: Ron Raymaker; Joe M. Summerline, Jr. Jim Pollard; Charlie Bradt; Frank W. Robinson

Area
  - Total: 1.95 sq mi (5.06 km^{2})
  - Land: 1.95 sq mi (5.06 km^{2})
  - Water: 0 sq mi (0.00 km^{2})
- Elevation: 148 ft (45 m)

Population (2020)
  - Total: 3,499
  - Density: 1,528.8/sq mi (590.28/km^{2})
- Time zone: UTC-6 (Central (CST))
  - Summer (DST): UTC-5 (CDT)
- ZIP codes: 77381, 77384, 77385
- Area code: 281
- FIPS code: 48-67400
- GNIS feature ID: 1388601
- Website: www.shenandoahtx.us

Shenandoah is a city in Montgomery County, Texas, United States. Its population was 3,499 at the 2020 census. It is the hometown of David Vetter, the famous "boy in the plastic bubble". In 1986, the Shenandoah city council renamed Tamina School Road to David Memorial Drive in honor of Vetter.

== Geography ==
Shenandoah is located at 30°10′47″N 95°27′19″W (30.179855, –95.455175). According to the United States Census Bureau, the city has a total area of 1.3 square miles (3.4 km^{2}), all land.

== Demographics ==
Historical population
Census	Pop.	Note	%±
1980	1,793		—
1990	1,718		−4.2%
2000	1,503		−12.5%
2010	2,134		42.0%
2020	3,499		64.0%
U.S. Decennial Census

=== 2020 census ===
As of the 2020 census, Shenandoah had a population of 3,499, 1,475 households, and 923 families residing in the city. The median age was 49.6 years, with 17.5% of residents under the age of 18 and 27.8% of residents 65 years of age or older. For every 100 females there were 85.4 males, and for every 100 females age 18 and over there were 80.0 males age 18 and over.

Of the 1,475 households, 24.8% had children under the age of 18 living in them. Of all households, 52.3% were married-couple households, 13.2% were households with a male householder and no spouse or partner present, and 30.8% were households with a female householder and no spouse or partner present. About 29.6% of all households were made up of individuals and 18.1% had someone living alone who was 65 years of age or older.

There were 1,562 housing units, of which 5.6% were vacant. The homeowner vacancy rate was 1.7% and the rental vacancy rate was 8.1%.

100.0% of residents lived in urban areas, while 0.0% lived in rural areas.

Racial composition as of the 2020 census
Race	Number	Percent
White	2,481	70.9%
Black or African American	123	3.5%
American Indian and Alaska Native	7	0.2%
Asian	266	7.6%
Native Hawaiian and Other Pacific Islander	3	0.1%
Some other race	134	3.8%
Two or more races	485	13.9%
Hispanic or Latino (of any race)	535	15.3%

=== 2010 census ===
As of the 2010 United States census, 2,134 people, 971 households, and 640 families resided in the city. The racial makeup of the city was 89.1% White, 3.6% African American, 0.3% Native American, 3.1% Asian, 1.7% from other races, and 2.1% from two or more races. Hispanics or Latinos of any race were 9.6% of the population.

Of the 971 households, 20.0% had children under 18 living with them, 52.8% were married couples living together, 10.5% had a female householder with no husband present, and 34.1% were not families. About 30.0% of all households were made up of individuals. The average household size was 2.20, and the average family size was 2.70.

In the city, the age distribution was 16.6% under 18, 7.0% from 18 to 24, 21.5% from 25 to 44, 33.4% from 45 to 64, and 21.4% who were 65 or older. The median age was 48.6 years. For every 100 females, there were 86.7 males. For every 100 females 18 and over, there were 84.5 males.

=== American Community Survey ===
As of the 2015 American Community Survey, the median income for a household in the city was $67,750 and for a family was $97,500. Males had a median income of $68,750 versus $35,179 for females. The per capita income for the city was $47,379. About 2.0% of families and 3.8% of the population were below the poverty line, including 2.0% of those under age 18 and 0.0% of those age 65 or over.

== Government ==
Shenandoah is governed locally by a city council consisting of a mayor and five at-large council members.

In the Texas Senate, Shenandoah is in District 4, represented by Republican Brandon Creighton. In the Texas House of Representatives, Shenandoah is in District 15, represented by Republican Steve Toth.

In the United States Senate, Republicans John Cornyn and Ted Cruz represent the entire state of Texas. In the United States House of Representatives, Shenandoah is in District 8, represented by Republican Morgan Luttrell.

== Economy ==
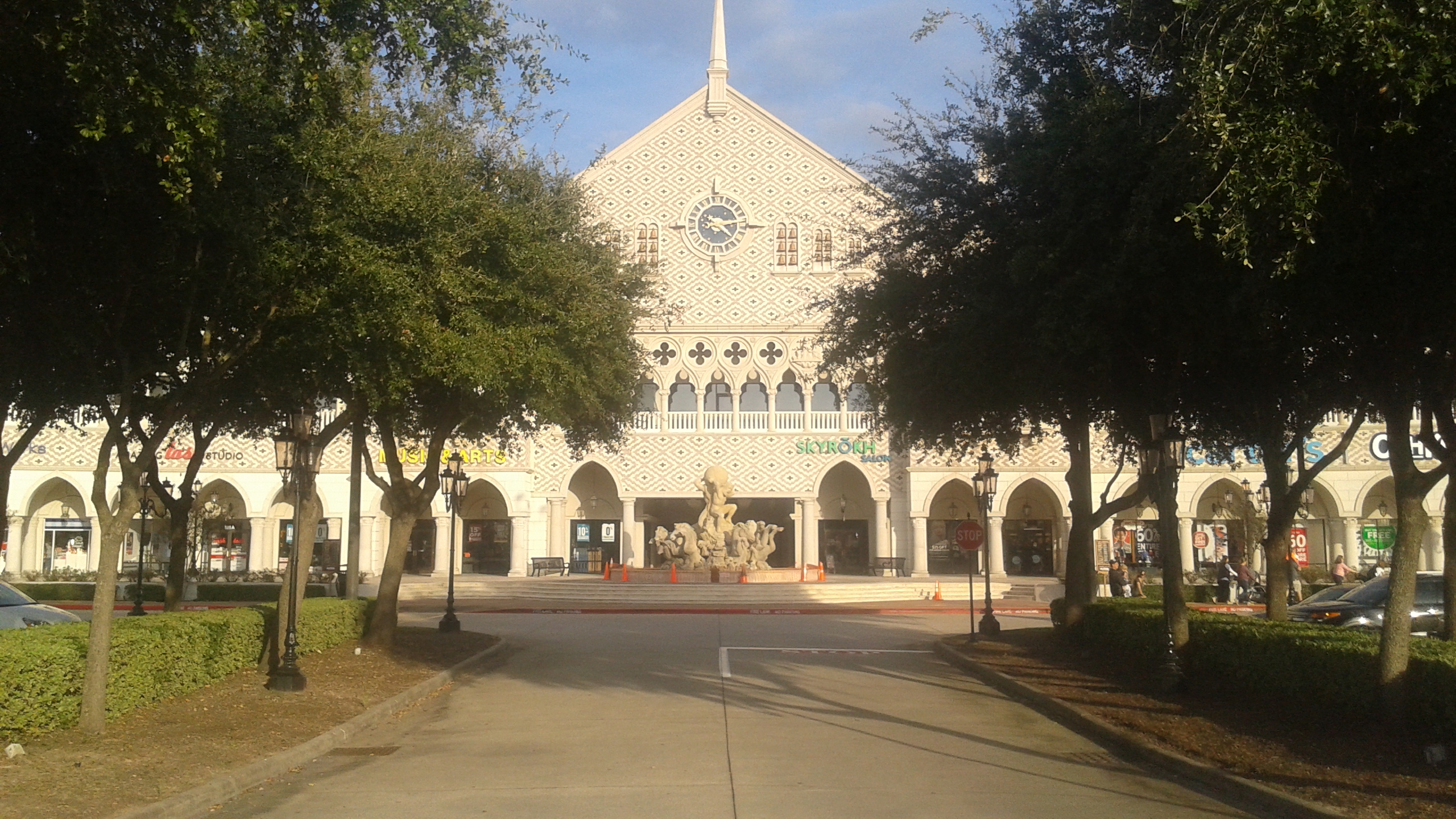
Portofino Shopping Center.

Kroger operates its Houston-area offices in Shenandoah. Two large shopping centers, Portofino Shopping Center and Metropark Square, house a variety of retailers.

== Education ==
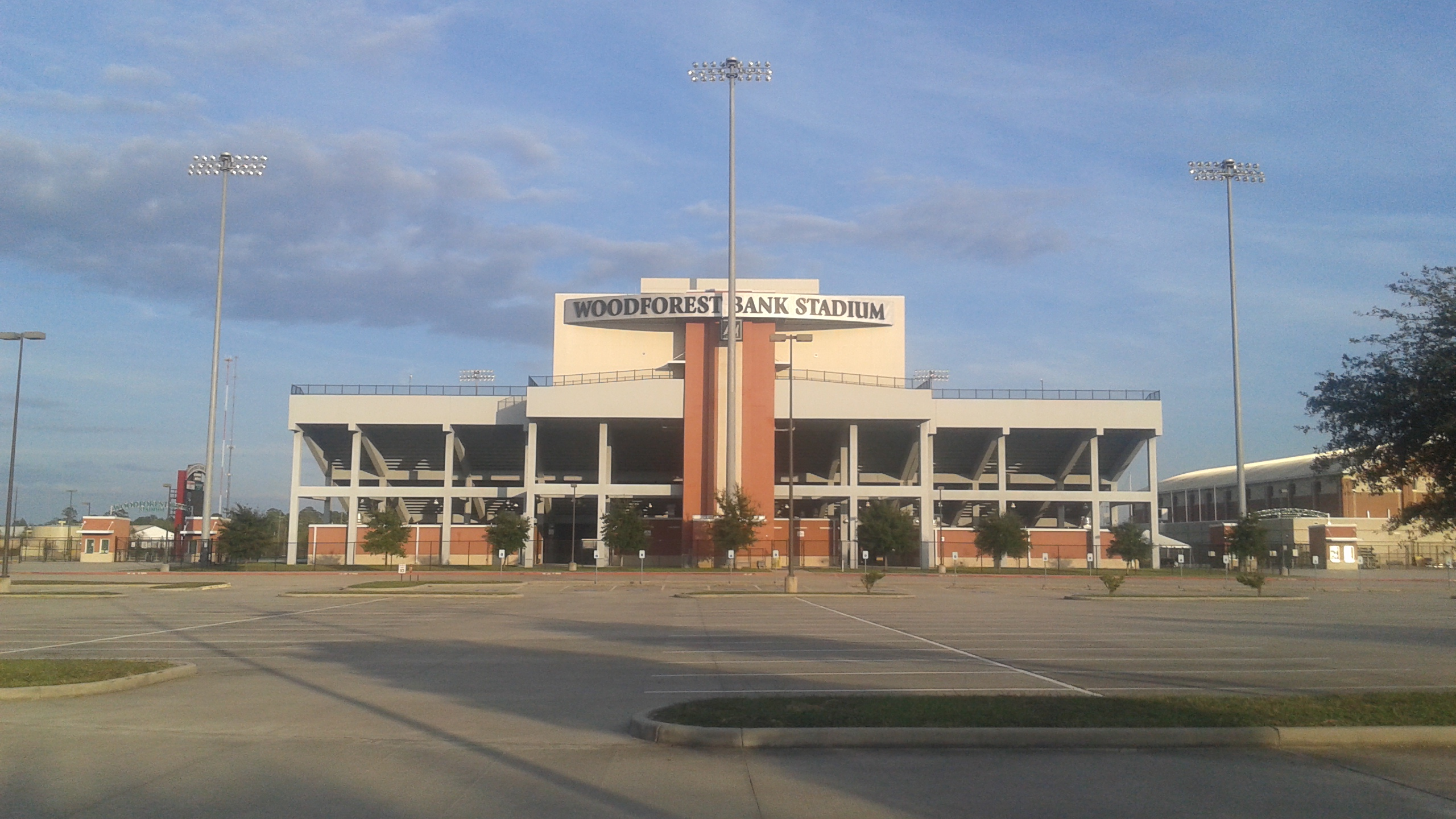
Woodforest Bank Stadium, a football stadium in Shenandoah owned by Conroe ISD

Shenandoah is served by the Conroe Independent School District.

Students west of Interstate 45 are in The Woodlands College Park High School feeder system.

- K–4th grade students attend Lamar Elementary.
- 5–6th grade students attend Wilkerson Intermediate.
- 7–8th grade students attend Knox Junior High.
- 9–12th grade students attend The Woodlands College Park High School.

Students east of Interstate 45 are in the Oak Ridge High School feeder system.

- K–4th grade students attend either Oak Ridge Elementary or Houser Elementary.
- 5–6th grade students attend Vogel Intermediate.
- 7–8th grade students Irons Junior High.
- 9th grade students attend Oak Ridge 9th grade campus and 10-12th grade students attend Oak Ridge High School.

Residents of Conroe ISD (and therefore Shenandoah) are served by the Lone Star College System (formerly North Harris Montgomery Community College).

== See also ==
- List of municipalities in Texas
