= Woodforest Bank Stadium =

Sports venue in Shenandoah, Texas, United States

- The Bank
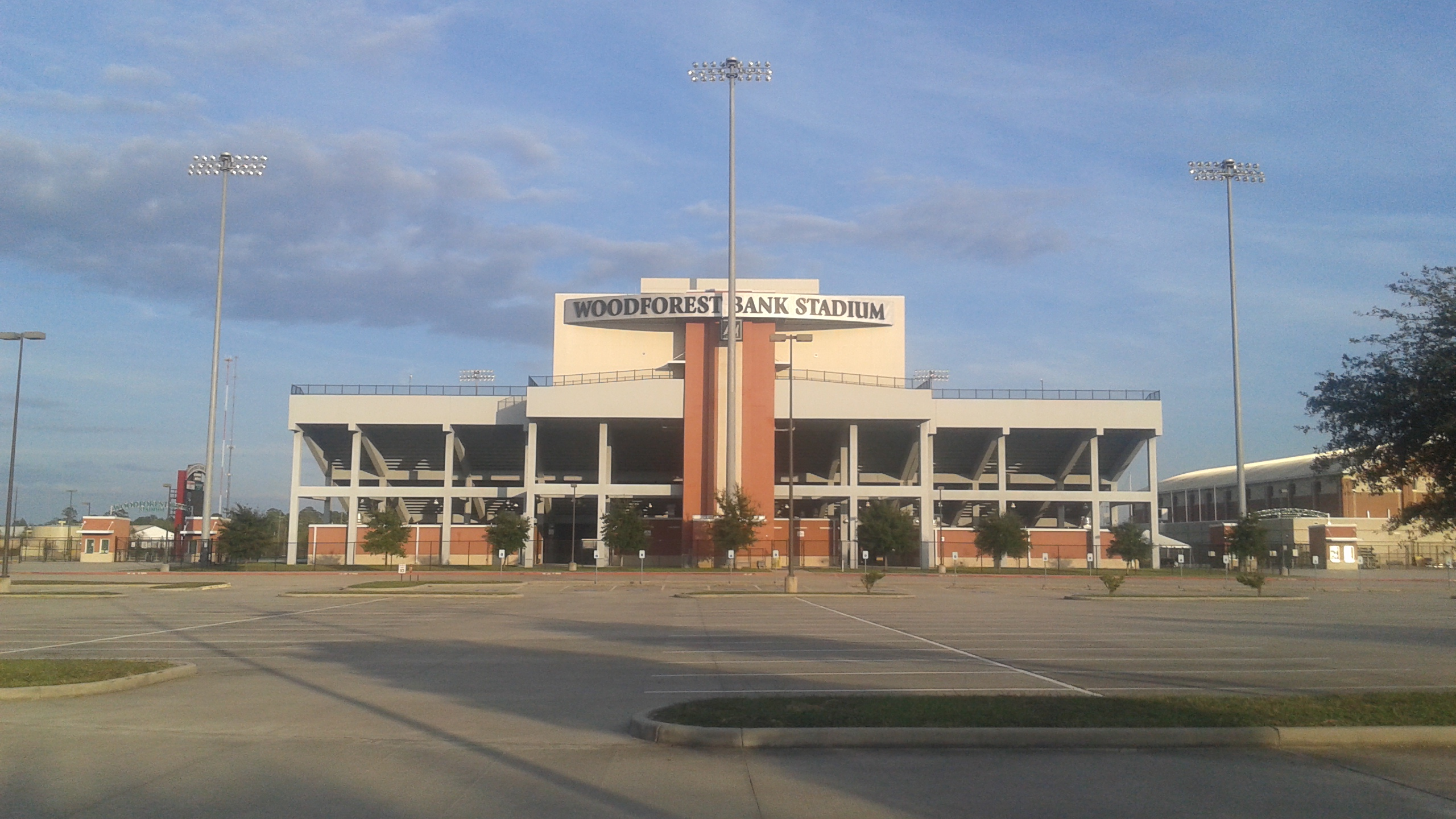
- Interactive map of Woodforest Bank Stadium
- Location: Shenandoah, Texas
- Coordinates: 30°11′10″N 95°26′49″W
- Owner: Conroe ISD
- Operator: Conroe ISD
- Capacity: 9,600
- Surface: Astro Turf

Construction
- Opened: August 2008

Tenants
- Regals FC (SPSL) (2010–2011)

The Woodforest Bank Stadium is an outdoor Football stadium and natatorium located in Shenandoah, Texas. The stadium is the home to the Oak Ridge High School War Eagles, Grand Oaks High School Grizzlies, The Woodlands High School Highlanders, and The Woodlands College Park High School Cavaliers. The stadium was home to the Houston Dutch Lions from 2013-2019.

Woodforest National Bank (based in the nearby development of The Woodlands, Texas) bought the rights to the name for $1 million from Conroe Independent School District, the stadium's owner.

In 2018 and 2019, Woodforest Bank Stadium was the site of the NCAA Division III Football Championship. The University of Mary Hardin-Baylor was the host institution in 2019.
