= AFCA Coach of the Year Award =

Annual award

- Awarded for: Top college football coach
- Country: United States
- Presented by: American Football Coaches Association

History
- First award: 1935
- Most recent: FBS: Curt Cignetti, Indiana; FCS: Steve Englehart, Presbyterian; D-II: Jim Clements, Kutztown; D-III: Brad Spencer, North Central (IL); NAIA: Joel Osborn, Benedictine
- Website: www.afca.com

The AFCA Coach of the Year Award is given annually to college football coaches by the American Football Coaches Association (AFCA). Separate awards are presented at all levels of U.S. college football. The AFCA as a whole presents the award for the four divisions of NCAA football—Division I FBS, Division I FCS, Division II, and Division III—plus the NAIA. The AFCA's section for community and junior colleges presents an identical award to a head coach at a two-year institution. The award has had several different sponsors over the years, including Eastman Kodak Corporation, and thus also been named the Kodak Coach of the Year Award.

== Winners ==
=== NCAA University Division / Division I-A/FBS ===
Year	Coach	Team
1935	Pappy Waldorf	Northwestern
1936	Dick Harlow	Harvard
1937	Edward Mylin	Lafayette
1938	Bill Kern	Carnegie Tech
1939	Eddie Anderson	Iowa
1940	Clark Shaughnessy	Stanford
1941	Frank Leahy	Notre Dame
1942	Bill Alexander	Georgia Tech
1943	Amos Alonzo Stagg	Pacific
1944	Carroll Widdoes	Ohio State
1945	Bo McMillin	Indiana
1946	Earl Blaik	Army
1947	Fritz Crisler	Michigan
1948	Bennie Oosterbaan	Michigan
1949	Bud Wilkinson	Oklahoma
1950	Charlie Caldwell	Princeton
1951	Chuck Taylor	Stanford
1952	Biggie Munn	Michigan State
1953	Jim Tatum	Maryland
1954	Henry Russell Sanders	UCLA
1955	Duffy Daugherty	Michigan State
1956	Bowden Wyatt	Tennessee
1957	Woody Hayes	Ohio State
1958	Paul Dietzel	LSU
1959	Ben Schwartzwalder	Syracuse
1960	Murray Warmath	Minnesota
1961	Bear Bryant	Alabama
1962	John McKay	USC
1963	Darrell Royal	Texas
1964	Frank Broyles	Arkansas
1964	Ara Parseghian	Notre Dame
1965	Tommy Prothro	UCLA
1966	Tom Cahill	Army
1967	John Pont	Indiana
1968	Joe Paterno	Penn State
1969	Bo Schembechler	Michigan
1970	Charles McClendon	LSU
1970	Darrell Royal	Texas
1971	Bear Bryant	Alabama
1972	John McKay	USC
1973	Bear Bryant	Alabama
1974	Grant Teaff	Baylor
1975	Frank Kush	Arizona State
1976	Johnny Majors	Pittsburgh
1977	Don James	Washington
1978	Joe Paterno	Penn State
1979	Earle Bruce	Ohio State
1980	Vince Dooley	Georgia
1981	Danny Ford	Clemson
1982	Joe Paterno	Penn State
1983	Ken Hatfield	Air Force
1984	LaVell Edwards	BYU
1985	Fisher DeBerry	Air Force
1986	Joe Paterno	Penn State
1987	Dick MacPherson	Syracuse
1988	Don Nehlen	West Virginia
1989	Bill McCartney	Colorado
1990	Bobby Ross	Georgia Tech
1991	Bill Lewis	East Carolina
1992	Gene Stallings	Alabama
1993	Barry Alvarez	Wisconsin
1994	Tom Osborne	Nebraska
1995	Gary Barnett	Northwestern
1996	Bruce Snyder	Arizona State
1997	Lloyd Carr	Michigan
1998	Phillip Fulmer	Tennessee
1999	Frank Beamer	Virginia Tech
2000	Bob Stoops	Oklahoma
2001	Larry Coker	Miami (FL)
2001	Ralph Friedgen	Maryland
2002	Jim Tressel	Ohio State
2003	Pete Carroll	USC
2004	Tommy Tuberville	Auburn
2005	Joe Paterno	Penn State
2006	Jim Grobe	Wake Forest
2007	Mark Mangino	Kansas
2008	Kyle Whittingham	Utah
2009	Gary Patterson	TCU
2010	Chip Kelly	Oregon
2011	Les Miles	LSU
2012	Brian Kelly	Notre Dame
2013	David Cutcliffe	Duke
2014	Gary Patterson	TCU
2015	Dabo Swinney	Clemson
2016	Mike MacIntyre	Colorado
2017	Scott Frost	UCF
2018	Mike Leach	Washington State
2019	Ed Orgeron	LSU
2020	Tom Allen	Indiana
2021	Luke Fickell	Cincinnati
2022	Sonny Dykes	TCU
2023	Kalen DeBoer	Washington
2024	Curt Cignetti	Indiana
2025	Curt Cignetti	Indiana

=== NCAA Division I-AA/FCS ===
Year	Coach	Team
1983	Rey Dempsey	Southern Illinois
1984	Dave Arnold	Montana State
1985	Dick Sheridan	Furman
1986	Erk Russell	Georgia Southern
1987	Mark Duffner	Holy Cross
1988	Jimmy Satterfield	Furman
1989	Erk Russell	Georgia Southern
1990	Tim Stowers	Georgia Southern
1991	Jim Tressel	Youngstown State
1992	Charlie Taaffe	The Citadel
1993	Dan Allen	Boston University
1994	Jim Tressel	Youngstown State
1995	Don Read	Montana
1996	Ray Tellier	Columbia
1997	Andy Talley	Villanova
1998	Mark Whipple	UMass
1999	Paul Johnson	Georgia Southern
2000	Paul Johnson	Georgia Southern
2001	Bobby Johnson	Furman
2002	Jack Harbaugh	Western Kentucky
2003	Dick Biddle	Colgate
2004	Mickey Matthews	James Madison
2005	Jerry Moore	Appalachian State
2006	Jerry Moore	Appalachian State
2007	Jerry Moore	Appalachian State
2008	Mike London	Richmond
2009	Andy Talley	Villanova
2010	K. C. Keeler	Delaware
2011	Willie Fritz	Sam Houston State
2012	Craig Bohl	North Dakota State
2013	Craig Bohl	North Dakota State
2014	Sean McDonnell	New Hampshire
2015	John Grass	Jacksonville State
2016	Mike Houston	James Madison
2017	Brian Bohannon	Kennesaw State
2018	Joe Harasymiak	Maine
2019	Matt Entz	North Dakota State
2020	Scott Wachenheim	VMI
2021	Matt Entz	North Dakota State
2022	John Stiegelmeier	South Dakota State
2023	Greg Gattuso	Albany
2024	Billy Cosh	Stony Brook
2025	Steve Englehart	Presbyterian

=== NCAA College Division / Division II ===
This includes NCAA Division II and NAIA from 1983 to 2005.

Year	Coach	Team
1960	Warren B. Woodson	New Mexico State
1961	Jake Gaither	Florida A&M
1962	Bill Edwards	Wittenberg
1963	Bill Edwards	Wittenberg
1964	Clarence Stasavich	East Carolina
1965	Jack Curtice	UC Santa Barbara
1966	Dan Jessee	Trinity (CT)
1967	Scrappy Moore	Chattanooga
1968	Jim Root	New Hampshire
1969	Larry Naviaux	Boston University
1970	Bennie Ellender	Arkansas State
1971	Tubby Raymond	Delaware
1972	Tubby Raymond	Delaware
1973	Dave Maurer	Wittenberg
1974	Roy Kramer	Central Michigan
1975	Dave Maurer	Wittenberg
1976	Jim Dennison	Akron
1977	Bill Manlove	Widener
1978	Lee Tressel	Baldwin–Wallace
1979	Bill Narduzzi	Youngstown State
1980	Rick E. Carter	Dayton
1981	Vito Ragazzo	Shippensburg
1982	Jim Wacker	Southwest Texas State
1983	Don Morton	North Dakota State
1984	Chan Gailey	Troy State
1985	George Landis	Bloomsburg
1986	Earle Solomonson	North Dakota State
1987	Rick Rhoades	Troy State
1988	Rocky Hager	North Dakota State
1989	John M. Williams	Mississippi College
1990	Rocky Hager	North Dakota State
1991	Chuck Broyles	Pittsburg State
1992	Bill Burgess	Jacksonville State
1993	Bobby Wallace	North Alabama
1994	Bobby Wallace	North Alabama
1995	Bobby Wallace	North Alabama
1996	Joe Glenn	Northern Colorado
1997	Joe Glenn	Northern Colorado
1998	Mel Tjeerdsma	Northwest Missouri State
1999	Mel Tjeerdsma	Northwest Missouri State
2000	Danny Hale	Bloomsburg
2001	Dale Lennon	North Dakota
2002	Brian Kelly	Grand Valley State
2003	Brian Kelly	Grand Valley State
2003	Mike Van Diest	Carroll (MT)
2004	Chris Hatcher	Valdosta State
2005	Chuck Martin	Grand Valley State
2006	Chuck Martin	Grand Valley State
2007	David Dean	Valdosta State
2008	Mel Tjeerdsma	Northwest Missouri State
2009	Mel Tjeerdsma	Northwest Missouri State
2010	Bob Nielson	Minnesota–Duluth
2011	Paul Winters	Wayne State (MI)
2012	David Dean	Valdosta State
2013	Adam Dorrel	Northwest Missouri State
2014	John Wristen	CSU Pueblo
2015	Adam Dorrel	Northwest Missouri State
2016	Adam Dorrel	Northwest Missouri State
2017	Pete Shinnick	West Florida
2018	Drew Cronic	Lenoir–Rhyne
2019	Todd Hoffner	Minnesota State
2020	No season due to the COVID-19 pandemic	
2021	Damon Wilson	Bowie State
2022	Brandon Moore	Colorado Mines
2023	Paul Simmons	Harding
2024	Tremaine Jackson	Valdosta State
2025	Jim Clements	Kutztown

=== NCAA Division III ===
This includes NCAA Division III and NAIA from 1983 to 1995.

Year	Coach	Team
1983	Bob Reade	Augustana (IL)
1984	Bob Reade	Augustana (IL)
1985	Bob Reade	Augustana (IL)
1986	Bob Reade	Augustana (IL)
1987	Walt Hameline	Wagner
1988	Jim Butterfield	Ithaca
1989	Mike Kelly	Dayton
1990	Ken O'Keefe	Allegheny
1991	Jim Butterfield	Ithaca
1992	John Luckhardt	Washington & Jefferson
1993	Larry Kehres	Mount Union
1994	Pete Schmidt	Albion
1995	Roger Harring	Wisconsin–La Crosse
1996	Larry Kehres	Mount Union
1997	Larry Kehres	Mount Union
1998	Larry Kehres	Mount Union
1999	Frosty Westering	Pacific Lutheran
2000	Larry Kehres	Mount Union
2001	Larry Kehres	Mount Union
2002	Larry Kehres	Mount Union
2003	John Gagliardi	Saint John's (MN)
2004	Jay Locey	Linfield
2005	Bob Berezowitz	Wisconsin–Whitewater
2006	Larry Kehres	Mount Union
2007	Lance Leipold	Wisconsin–Whitewater
2008	Larry Kehres	Mount Union
2009	Lance Leipold	Wisconsin–Whitewater
2010	Lance Leipold	Wisconsin–Whitewater
2011	Lance Leipold	Wisconsin–Whitewater
2012	Glenn Caruso	St. Thomas (MN)
2013	Lance Leipold	Wisconsin–Whitewater
2014	Lance Leipold	Wisconsin–Whitewater
2015	Glenn Caruso	St. Thomas (MN)
2016	Pete Fredenburg	Mary Hardin–Baylor
2017	Jason Mangone	Brockport
2018	Jim Margraff	Johns Hopkins
2019	Nate Milne	Muhlenberg
2020	No season due to the COVID-19 pandemic	
2021	Jeff McMartin	Central (IA)
2022	Steve Johnson	Bethel (MN)
2023	Curt Fitzpatrick	Cortland
2024	Sherman Wood	Salisbury
2025	Brad Spencer	North Central (IL)

=== NAIA ===
NAIA was included in the Division II and III groups until 2006 when it was broken into its own category.

Year	Coach	Team
2006	Kalen DeBoer	Sioux Falls
2007	Mike Van Diest	Carroll (MT)
2008	Kalen DeBoer	Sioux Falls
2009	Kalen DeBoer	Sioux Falls
2010	Mike Van Diest	Carroll (MT)
2011	Mike Feminis	Saint Xavier
2012	Steve Ryan	Morningside
2013	Mike Woodley	Grand View
2014	Mark Henninger	Marian
2015	Mark Henninger	Marian
2016	Kevin Donley	Saint Francis (IN)
2017	Kevin Donley	Saint Francis (IN)
2018	Steve Ryan	Morningside
2019	Steve Ryan	Morningside
2020	Chris Oliver	Lindsey Wilson
2021	Steve Ryan	Morningside
2022	Matt McCarty	Northwestern (IA)
2023	Doug Socha	Keiser
2024	Myles Russ	Keiser
2025	Joel Osborn	Benedictine

=== Junior college ===
The California Community College Athletic Association (3C2A) and the National Junior College Athletic Association (NJCAA) each had their own coach of the year honors until 2002 when they joined together to award the American Community College Football Coaches Association (ACCFCA) Coach of the Year Award. The NJCAA continues to award coach of the year honors in both their Division I and Division III levels (and previously when they operated without divisions) outside of the ACCFCA Coach of the Year Award. The NJCAA Coach of the Year award is awarded by the NJCAA Football Coaches Association.

Year	Coach	Team
2002	Michael White	Reedley
2003	Troy Morrell	Butler County
2004	Tim Hatten	Pearl River
2005	Don Dillon	American River
2006	John Featherstone	El Camino
2007	Jeff Chudy	Bakersfield
2008	Jeff Jordan	Butte
2009	Brad Franchione	Blinn
2010	Bob Jastrab	Mt. San Antonio
2011	Buddy Stephens	East Mississippi
2012	Scott Strohmeier	Iowa Western
2013	Bert Williams	Georgia Military
2014	Buddy Stephens	East Mississippi
2015	Mark McElroy	Saddleback
2016	Jeff Sims	Garden City
2017	Scott Strohmeier	Iowa Western
2018	Steve Mooshagian	Ventura
2019	Tom Craft	Reedley
2020	No season due to the COVID-19 pandemic	
2021	Kurt Taufa'asau	New Mexico Military
2022	Drew Dallas	Hutchinson
2023	Tom Craft	Reedley
2024	Drew Dallas	Hutchinson
2025	Drew Dallas	Hutchinson

== Assistant Coach of the Year Award ==
The Assistant Coach of the Year Award is presented to a deserving assistant coach in each of the four NCAA football divisions and the NAIA. The award was created to honor assistant coaches who excel in community service, commitment to the student-athlete, on-field coaching success and AFCA and professional organization involvement.

Year	Division	Coach	Team
1997	Division I-A	Alan Gooch	UCF
1997	Division I-AA	Alonzo Lee	Hampton
1997	Division II	Richard Cundiff	Texas A&M–Kingsville
1997	Division III	Roland Christensen	Wisconsin–La Crosse
1997	NAIA	Samuel Wickliffe	Campbellsville
1998	Division I-A	Richard Bell	Air Force
1998	Division I-AA	John Wright	Hampton
1998	Division II	Wesley McGriff	Kentucky State
1998	Division III	Mike Plinske	Bethel (MN)
1998	NAIA	Eric Graves	Campbellsville
1999	Division I-A	Jerry Sandusky	Penn State
1999	Division I-AA	David Bailiff	Southwest Texas State
1999	Division II	Mike Moroski	UC Davis
1999	Division III	Don Montgomery	Mount Union
1999	NAIA	Haywood Riner	Campbellsville
2000	Division I-A	John Gutekunst	South Carolina
2000	Division I-AA	John Shannon	Jackson State
2000	Division II	Kyle Schweigert	North Dakota
2000	Division III	Don DeWaard	Central (IA)
2000	NAIA	Bill O'Boyle	Hastings
2001	Division I-A	Fred Jackson	Michigan
2001	Division I-AA	Tom Gilmore	Lehigh
2001	Division II	Bart Tatum	Northwest Missouri State
2001	Division III	Chris Meidt	Bethel (MN)
2001	NAIA	Roger VanDeZande	Southern Oregon
2002	Division I-A	Ron Aiken	Iowa
2002	Division I-AA	Roy Wittke	Eastern Illinois
2002	Division II	Tony Ierulli	Shippensburg
2002	Division III	Brian Ward	Wabash
2002	NAIA	Charles Gartenmayer	Benedictine
2003	Division I-A	Chuck Petersen	Air Force
2003	Division I-AA	Donovan Rose	Hampton
2003	Division II	Mike Turner	Carson–Newman
2003	Division III	Pedro Arruza	Washington (MO)
2003	NAIA	Mike Gardner	Tabor
2004	Division I-A	Brian White	Wisconsin
2004	Division I-AA	Tony Pierce	Alabama State
2004	Division II	Brian Hughes	C. W. Post
2004	Division III	Keith Emery	Johns Hopkins
2004	NAIA	Nick Howlett	Carroll (MT)
2005	Division I-A	Michael Haywood	Notre Dame
2005	Division I-AA	Galen Scott	Illinois State
2005	Division II	Cary Fowler	Midwestern State
2005	Division III	Dan Garrett	Kean
2005	NAIA	Allen Friesen	Dana
2006	Division I FBS	John Chavis	Tennessee
2006	Division I FCS	Sam Eddy	Youngstown State
2006	Division II	Mike Terwilliger	East Stroudsburg
2006	Division III	Jeff Wojtowicz	Mount Union
2006	NAIA	Colby Hensley	Kansas Wesleyan
2007	Division I FBS	Calvin Magee	West Virginia
2007	Division I FCS	Tom Matukewicz	Southern Illinois
2007	Division II	Scott Bostwick	Northwest Missouri State
2007	Division III	Neal Neathery	Wabash
2007	NAIA	Ryan Nourse	Morningside
2008	Division I FBS	Mac McWhorter	Texas
2008	Division I FCS	John Loose	Lafayette
2008	Division II	Matt Entz	Winona State
2008	Division III	Dick Bowzer	Central (IA)
2008	NAIA	Dennis Murphy	Benedictine
2009	Division I FBS	Mike MacIntyre	Duke
2009	Division I FCS	Mark Speir	Appalachian State
2009	Division II	David Needs	Carson–Newman
2009	Division III	Jeff Thomas	Redlands
2009	NAIA	Josh Gehring	Morningside
2010	Division I FBS	Luke Fickell	Ohio State
2010	Division I FCS	Rick Fox	Drake
2010	Division II	Joe Lorig	Central Washington
2010	Division III	Chris Rusiewicz	Ursinus
2010	NAIA	Doug Schleeman	Montana Tech
2011	Division I FBS	Norm Parker	Iowa
2011	Division I FCS	Jason McEndoo	Montana State
2011	Division II	Hank McClung	Central Missouri
2011	Division III	Greg Peterson	Bethel (MN)
2011	NAIA	Craig Mullins	Georgetown (KY)
2012	Division I FBS	Kirby Smart	Alabama
2012	Division I FCS	John Revere	Eastern Kentucky
2012	Division II	A. J. Blazek	Winona State
2012	Division III	Joe Early	Middlebury
2012	NAIA	Gregg Horner	Valley City State
2013	Division I FBS	Chad Morris	Clemson
2013	Division I FCS	John Banaszak	Robert Morris
2013	Division II	Denares Waites	Carson–Newman
2013	Division III	Mike Schmidt	Dubuque
2013	NAIA	Jim Hogan	Carroll (MT)
2014	Division I FBS	Gary Campbell	Oregon
2014	Division I FCS	Robert Wimberly	Liberty
2014	Division II	Joel Williams	Delta State
2014	Division III	John Davis	Gallaudet
2014	NAIA	Alan Dykens	Graceland
2015	Division I FBS	Don Brown	Boston College
2015	Division I FCS	Mark Ferrante	Villanova
2015	Division II	Ben Martin	Colorado Mesa
2015	Division III	Jim Ryan	Washington (MO)
2015	NAIA	Mike Gutelius	Lindsey Wilson
2016	Division I FBS	Dan Brooks	Clemson
2016	Division I FCS	Eric Dooley	Grambling State
2016	Division II	Mike Aldrich	Southwest Minnesota State
2016	Division III	Scott Kirchoff	Bethel (MN)
2016	NAIA	Lou Varley	Peru State
2017	Division I FBS	Van Malone	SMU
2017	Division I FCS	Brian Rock	Holy Cross
2017	Division II	Taylor Breitzman	South Dakota Mines
2017	Division III	Oscar Rodriguez	La Verne
2017	NAIA	Billy Hickman	Tabor
2018	Division I FBS	Jeff Faris	Duke
2018	Division I FCS	Milo Austin	Morehead State
2018	Division II	Marcus Hilliard	Virginia Union
2018	Division III	Mickey Rehring	Johns Hopkins
2018	NAIA	Phil Kleckler	Lindsey Wilson
2019	Division I FBS	Mike Viti	Army
2019	Division I FCS	Jason Eck	South Dakota State
2019	Division II	Donnell Leomiti	CSU Pueblo
2019	Division III	Luke Cutkomp	Chicago
2019	NAIA	Mike Ridings	Marian
2020	Division I FBS	Randy Bates	Pittsburgh
2020	Division I FCS	Randy Hedberg	North Dakota State
2020	Division II	No season due to the COVID-19 pandemic	
2020	Division III	No season due to the COVID-19 pandemic	
2020	NAIA	Casey Jacobsen	Morningside
2021	Division I FBS	Newland Isaac	Coastal Carolina
2021	Division I FCS	Corey Hetherman	James Madison
2021	Division II	Mike Morita	Virginia Union
2021	Division III	Paul Michalak	Trinity (TX)
2021	NAIA	Matt Myers	Kansas Wesleyan
2022	Division I FBS	Mike Tressel	Cincinnati
2022	Division I FCS	Chris Kappas	Austin Peay
2022	Division II	Nate Shreffler	Hillsdale
2022	Division III	Joe Gerbino	Utica
2022	NAIA	George Papageorgiou	Benedictine (KS)
2023	Division I FBS	Phil Parker	Iowa
2023	Division I FCS	Christian Taylor	William & Mary
2023	Division II	Edward Pointer	Virginia Union
2023	Division III	Ben Gibboney	Carnegie Mellon
2023	NAIA	Justin Robinson	Marian (IN)
2024	Division I FBS	Sean Saturnio	Army
2024	Division I FCS	Don Dobes	Dartmouth
2024	Division II	Roy Thompson Jr.	Ouachita Baptist
2024	Division III	Cody Baethke	Coe
2024	NAIA	Michael Jones	Florida Memorial
2025	Division I FBS	Bryant Haines	Indiana
2025	Division I FCS	Keith Clark	Dartmouth
2025	Division II	Tyler Almond	Carson–Newman
2025	Division III	Eric Jones	Central
2025	NAIA	Peter Davila	Keiser
