= D3football.com =

Organization recognizing NCAA DIII football

- Formation: 1998
- Executive Editor: Pat Coleman
- Managing Editor: Greg Thomas
- Editor Emeritus: Keith McMillan
- Senior Editor: Ryan Tipps
- Website: d3football.com

D3football.com is an organization that reports and recognizes the accomplishments of NCAA Division III football. D3football.com aims to showcase the lower divisions of the NCAA and promote the student-athletes within those divisions. Additionally, D3football.com is responsible for one of the two Top 25 polls for Division III football, alongside the American Football Coaches Association. They also keep attendance records for NCAA Division III football as well, since the NCAA does not recognize attendance records for lower divisions.

The organization recognizes individuals through weekly awards throughout the season, as well as all-region and all-American teams at the conclusion of the year. They also help to present the Gagliardi Trophy by announcing semifinalists, finalists, and the winner.

== All-American Teams ==
Since 1999, D3football.com has selected an All-American team. It is selected by the editors through nominations by DIII sports information directors (SIDs) and is also recognized by the NCAA.

== D3football.com National Coach of the Year ==
In 2005, D3football.com started awarding a national coach of the year for NCAA Division III.

Year	Coach	Team
2005	Bob Berezowitz	Wisconsin–Whitewater
2006	Larry Kehres	Mount Union
2007	Lance Leipold	Wisconsin–Whitewater
2008	Lance Leipold	Wisconsin–Whitewater
2009	Lance Leipold	Wisconsin–Whitewater
2010	Lance Leipold	Wisconsin–Whitewater
2011	Lance Leipold	Wisconsin–Whitewater
2012	Larry Kehres	Mount Union
2013	Lance Leipold	Wisconsin–Whitewater
2014	Joseph Smith	Linfield
2015	Vince Kehres	Mount Union
2016	Tom Arth	John Carroll
2017	Vince Kehres	Mount Union
2018	Jim Margraff	Johns Hopkins
2019	Jeff Thorne	North Central (IL)
2020	No season due to the COVID-19	
2021	Pete Fredenburg	Mary Hardin–Baylor
2022	Chris Winter	Wartburg
2023	Curt Fitzpatrick	Cortland
2024	Brad Spencer	North Central
2025	Matt Walker	Wisconsin–River Falls

== D3football.com National Player of the Year ==
In 2005, D3football.com started awarding an offensive and defensive player of the year for NCAA Division III.

Year	Offensive	Team	Defensive	Team
2005	Brett Elliott	Linfield	Damien Dumonceaux	Saint John's (MN)
2006	Nate Kmic	Mount Union	Ryan Kleppe	Wisconsin–Whitewater
2007	Justin Beaver	Wisconsin–Whitewater	Jerrell Freeman	Mary Hardin–Baylor
2008	Nate Kmic	Mount Union	Jace Rindahl	Wisconsin–Whitewater
2009	Cecil Shorts	Mount Union	Eddie Vallery	Wittenberg
2010	Levell Coppage	Wisconsin–Whitewater	Matt Wenger	North Central (IL)
2011	Levell Coppage	Wisconsin–Whitewater	Nick Driskill	Mount Union
2012	Nate Wara	Wisconsin–Oshkosh	Javicz Jones	Mary Hardin–Baylor
2013	Kevin Burke	Mount Union	Cole Klotz	Wisconsin–Whitewater
2014	Jake Kumerow	Wisconsin–Whitewater	Tyre Coleman	Hobart
2015	Jordan Roberts	St. Thomas (MN)	Tom Lally	Mount Union
2016	Sam Riddle	Linfield	Teidrick Smith	Mary Hardin–Baylor
2017	Brett Kasper	Wisconsin–Oshkosh	Mamadou Soumahoro	Berry
2018	Jackson Erdmann	Saint John's (MN)	Louis Berry	Mount Union
2019	Broc Rutter	North Central (IL)	Dallas McRae	Wheaton (IL)
2020	No season due to the COVID-19			
2021	Blaine Hawkins	Central (IA)	Jefferson Fritz	Mary Hardin–Baylor
2022	Ethan Greenfield	North Central (IL)	Michael Nobile	Delaware Valley
2023	Luke Lehnen	North Central (IL)	Owen Grover	Wartburg
2024	Luke Lehnen	North Central (IL)	Matt Jung	Bethel
2025	Kaleb Blaha	Wisconsin–River Falls	JP Sullivan	North Central (IL)
