= List of Wisconsin Intercollegiate Athletic Conference football standings =

This is a list of yearly Wisconsin Intercollegiate Athletic Conference football standings.

== Wisconsin Intercollegiate Athletic Conference standings ==
=== Early history ===
1934 Wisconsin State Teachers College Conference football standings
	Conf.					Overall
Team	W		L		T	W		L		T
Northern Division
La Crosse State x	3	–	0	–	1	5	–	1	–	2
River Falls State	3	–	1	–	0	5	–	3	–	0
Superior State	1	–	1	–	2	2	–	3	–	3
Eau Claire State	1	–	2	–	1	5	–	2	–	1
Stout Institute	0	–	4	–	0	0	–	6	–	0
Southern Division
Stevens Point State x	4	–	0	–	0	7	–	1	–	0
Milwaukee State	3	–	1	–	0	3	–	4	–	1
Whitewater State	2	–	2	–	0	3	–	4	–	0
Oshkosh State	1	–	3	–	0	3	–	3	–	1
Platteville State	0	–	4	–	0	1	–	4	–	0
x – Division champion/co-champions

=== Modern era ===
2005 Wisconsin Intercollegiate Athletic Conference football standings
	Conf.			Overall
Team	W		L	W		L
No. 2 Wisconsin–Whitewater $^	7	–	0	14	–	1
Wisconsin–Eau Claire	5	–	2	6	–	4
Wisconsin–Oshkosh	4	–	3	7	–	3
Wisconsin–La Crosse	4	–	3	5	–	4
Wisconsin–Stout	3	–	4	6	–	4
Wisconsin–Stevens Point	3	–	4	4	–	6
Wisconsin–River Falls	2	–	5	3	–	7
Wisconsin–Platteville	0	–	7	1	–	9
$ – Conference champion; ^ – NCAA Division III playoff participant; Rankings from D3football.com

2006 Wisconsin Intercollegiate Athletic Conference football standings
	Conf.			Overall
Team	W		L	W		L
No. 2 Wisconsin–Whitewater $^	7	–	0	14	–	1
No. 6 Wisconsin–La Crosse ^	6	–	1	9	–	2
Wisconsin–Stevens Point	4	–	3	6	–	4
Wisconsin–Oshkosh	3	–	4	5	–	5
Wisconsin–Platteville	3	–	4	5	–	5
Wisconsin–Eau Claire	2	–	5	3	–	7
Wisconsin–River Falls	2	–	5	3	–	7
Wisconsin–Stout	1	–	6	3	–	7
$ – Conference champion; ^ – NCAA Division III playoff participant; Rankings from D3football.com

2007 Wisconsin Intercollegiate Athletic Conference football standings
	Conf.			Overall
Team	W		L	W		L
No. 1 Wisconsin–Whitewater $^	7	–	0	14	–	1
No. 12 Wisconsin–Eau Claire ^	5	–	2	9	–	3
Wisconsin–Oshkosh	4	–	3	7	–	3
Wisconsin–Stevens Point	3	–	4	6	–	4
Wisconsin–La Crosse	3	–	4	5	–	4
Wisconsin–Stout	3	–	4	4	–	6
Wisconsin–River Falls	2	–	5	3	–	7
Wisconsin–Platteville	1	–	6	2	–	8
$ – Conference champion; ^ – NCAA Division III playoff participant; Rankings from D3football.com

2008 Wisconsin Intercollegiate Athletic Conference football standings
	Conf.			Overall
Team	W		L	W		L
No. 2 Wisconsin–Whitewater +^	6	–	1	13	–	2
No. 14 Wisconsin–Stevens Point +^	6	–	1	9	–	2
Wisconsin–Eau Claire	4	–	3	6	–	4
Wisconsin–Stout	3	–	4	5	–	5
Wisconsin–La Crosse	3	–	4	3	–	7
Wisconsin–Oshkosh	2	–	5	4	–	5
Wisconsin–Platteville	2	–	5	4	–	6
Wisconsin–River Falls	2	–	5	3	–	7
+ – Conference co-champions; ^ – NCAA Division III playoff participant; Rankings from D3football.com

2009 Wisconsin Intercollegiate Athletic Conference football standings
	Conf.			Overall
Team	W		L	W		L
No. 1 Wisconsin–Whitewater $^	7	–	0	15	–	0
Wisconsin–Stevens Point	6	–	1	7	–	3
Wisconsin–Stout	5	–	2	8	–	2
Wisconsin–Eau Claire	4	–	3	6	–	4
Wisconsin–La Crosse	2	–	5	5	–	5
Wisconsin–Oshkosh	2	–	5	4	–	6
Wisconsin–Platteville	1	–	6	3	–	7
Wisconsin–River Falls	1	–	6	3	–	7
$ – Conference champion; ^ – NCAA Division III playoff participant; Rankings from D3football.com

2010 Wisconsin Intercollegiate Athletic Conference football standings
	Conf.			Overall
Team	W		L	W		L
No. 1 Wisconsin–Whitewater $^	7	–	0	15	–	0
Wisconsin–Stevens Point	5	–	2	7	–	3
Wisconsin–Stout	4	–	3	6	–	4
Wisconsin–Platteville	3	–	4	5	–	5
Wisconsin–Oshkosh	3	–	4	4	–	6
Wisconsin–La Crosse	3	–	4	3	–	7
Wisconsin–Eau Claire	2	–	5	4	–	6
Wisconsin–River Falls	1	–	6	1	–	9
$ – Conference champion; ^ – NCAA Division III playoff participant; Rankings from D3football.com

2011 Wisconsin Intercollegiate Athletic Conference football standings
	Conf.			Overall
Team	W		L	W		L
No. 1 Wisconsin–Whitewater $^	7	–	0	15	–	0
Wisconsin–Oshkosh	5	–	2	7	–	3
Wisconsin–Platteville	5	–	2	7	–	3
Wisconsin–Eau Claire	3	–	4	5	–	5
Wisconsin–Stout	3	–	4	5	–	5
Wisconsin–Stevens Point	2	–	5	4	–	6
Wisconsin–La Crosse	2	–	5	3	–	7
Wisconsin–River Falls	1	–	6	1	–	9
$ – Conference champion; ^ – NCAA Division III playoff participant; Rankings from D3football.com

2012 Wisconsin Intercollegiate Athletic Conference football standings
	Conf.			Overall
Team	W		L	W		L
No. 4 Wisconsin–Oshkosh $^	7	–	0	13	–	1
No. 13 Wisconsin–Platteville	5	–	2	8	–	2
Wisconsin–Whitewater	5	–	2	7	–	3
Wisconsin–Eau Claire	4	–	3	4	–	6
Wisconsin–La Crosse	3	–	4	4	–	6
Wisconsin–River Falls	2	–	5	2	–	8
Wisconsin–Stout	1	–	6	3	–	7
Wisconsin–Stevens Point	1	–	6	2	–	8
$ – Conference champion; ^ – NCAA Division III playoff participant; Rankings from D3football.com

2013 Wisconsin Intercollegiate Athletic Conference football standings
	Conf.			Overall
Team	W		L	W		L
No. 1 Wisconsin–Whitewater $^	7	–	0	15	–	0
No. 9 Wisconsin–Platteville ^	6	–	1	10	–	2
No. 11 Wisconsin–Oshkosh	5	–	2	8	–	2
Wisconsin–Stevens Point	3	–	4	5	–	5
Wisconsin–La Crosse	3	–	4	3	–	7
Wisconsin–Stout	2	–	5	4	–	6
Wisconsin–Eau Claire	2	–	5	2	–	8
Wisconsin–River Falls	0	–	7	0	–	10
$ – Conference champion; ^ – NCAA Division III playoff participant; Rankings from D3football.com

2014 Wisconsin Intercollegiate Athletic Conference football standings
	Conf.			Overall
Team	W		L	W		L
No. 1 Wisconsin–Whitewater $^	7	–	0	15	–	0
No. 20 Wisconsin–Oshkosh	6	–	1	6	–	4
Wisconsin–Platteville	5	–	2	7	–	3
Wisconsin–Stevens Point	4	–	3	7	–	3
Wisconsin–La Crosse	2	–	5	3	–	7
Wisconsin–River Falls	2	–	5	3	–	7
Wisconsin–Stout	1	–	6	2	–	8
Wisconsin–Eau Claire	1	–	6	1	–	9
$ – Conference champion; ^ – NCAA Division III playoff participant; Rankings from D3football.com

2015 Wisconsin Intercollegiate Athletic Conference football standings
	Conf.			Overall
Team	W		L	W		L
No. 5 Wisconsin–Oshkosh $^	7	–	0	11	–	2
No. 4 Wisconsin–Whitewater ^	6	–	1	12	–	2
No. 14 Wisconsin–Platteville	5	–	2	8	–	2
Wisconsin–Stevens Point	3	–	4	5	–	5
Wisconsin–River Falls	3	–	4	4	–	6
Wisconsin–La Crosse	2	–	5	3	–	7
Wisconsin–Stout	2	–	5	3	–	7
Wisconsin–Eau Claire	0	–	7	0	–	10
$ – Conference champion; ^ – NCAA Division III playoff participant; Rankings from D3football.com

2016 Wisconsin Intercollegiate Athletic Conference football standings
	Conf.			Overall
Team	W		L	W		L
No. 5 Wisconsin–Whitewater $^	7	–	0	12	–	1
No. 2 Wisconsin–Oshkosh ^	6	–	1	13	–	2
No. 14 Wisconsin–Platteville ^	5	–	2	8	–	3
Wisconsin–Stevens Point	3	–	4	6	–	4
Wisconsin–River Falls	3	–	4	4	–	6
Wisconsin–La Crosse	2	–	5	5	–	5
Wisconsin–Stout	1	–	6	3	–	7
Wisconsin–Eau Claire	1	–	6	2	–	8
$ – Conference champion; ^ – NCAA Division III playoff participant; Rankings from D3football.com

2017 Wisconsin Intercollegiate Athletic Conference football standings
	Conf.			Overall
Team	W		L	W		L
No. 3 Wisconsin–Oshkosh $^	7	–	0	12	–	1
No. 23 Wisconsin–Whitewater	6	–	1	7	–	3
No. 24 Wisconsin–La Crosse	5	–	2	8	–	2
Wisconsin–Platteville	4	–	3	7	–	3
Wisconsin–Stout	3	–	4	5	–	4
Wisconsin–River Falls	2	–	5	4	–	6
Wisconsin–Stevens Point	1	–	6	4	–	6
Wisconsin–Eau Claire	0	–	7	1	–	9
$ – Conference champion; ^ – NCAA Division III playoff participant; Rankings from D3football.com

2018 Wisconsin Intercollegiate Athletic Conference football standings
	Conf.			Overall
Team	W		L	W		L
No. 4 Wisconsin–Whitewater $^	7	–	0	12	–	1
Wisconsin–La Crosse	5	–	2	7	–	3
Wisconsin–Oshkosh	4	–	3	6	–	4
Wisconsin–Stout	3	–	4	5	–	5
Wisconsin–Stevens Point	3	–	4	4	–	6
Wisconsin–Eau Claire	2	–	5	4	–	6
Wisconsin–Platteville	2	–	5	4	–	6
Wisconsin–River Falls	2	–	5	3	–	7
$ – Conference champion; ^ – NCAA Division III playoff participant; Rankings from D3football.com

2019 Wisconsin Intercollegiate Athletic Conference football standings
	Conf.			Overall
Team	W		L	W		L
No. 2 Wisconsin–Whitewater +^	6	–	1	13	–	2
No. 22 Wisconsin–Oshkosh +^	6	–	1	8	–	3
Wisconsin–La Crosse	5	–	2	7	–	3
Wisconsin–Platteville	4	–	3	7	–	3
Wisconsin–Stout	3	–	4	4	–	6
Wisconsin–Stevens Point	2	–	5	3	–	7
Wisconsin–Eau Claire	1	–	6	3	–	7
Wisconsin–River Falls	1	–	6	2	–	8
+ – Conference co-champions; ^ – NCAA Division III playoff participant; Rankings from D3football.com
