= 2013 Wisconsin–Whitewater Warhawks football team =

American college football season

2013 Wisconsin–Whitewater Warhawks football

NCAA Division III champion WIAC champion

Stagg Bowl, W 52–14 vs. Mount Union
- Conference: Wisconsin Intercollegiate Athletic Conference

Ranking
- D3Football.com: No. 1
- Record: 15–0 (7–0 WIAC)
- Head coach: Lance Leipold (7th season)
- Offensive coordinator: Andy Kotelnicki (1st season)
- Offensive scheme: Multiple pro-style / spread
- Defensive coordinator: Brian Borland (12th season)
- Base defense: 4–3
- Home stadium: Perkins Stadium

2013 Wisconsin Intercollegiate Athletic Conference football standings
	Conf.			Overall
Team	W		L	W		L
No. 1 Wisconsin–Whitewater $^	7	–	0	15	–	0
No. 9 Wisconsin–Platteville ^	6	–	1	10	–	2
No. 11 Wisconsin–Oshkosh	5	–	2	8	–	2
Wisconsin–Stevens Point	3	–	4	5	–	5
Wisconsin–La Crosse	3	–	4	3	–	7
Wisconsin–Stout	2	–	5	4	–	6
Wisconsin–Eau Claire	2	–	5	2	–	8
Wisconsin–River Falls	0	–	7	0	–	10
$ – Conference champion; ^ – NCAA Division III playoff participant; Rankings from D3football.com

The 2013 Wisconsin–Whitewater Warhawks football team was an American football team that represented the University of Wisconsin–Whitewater as a member of the Wisconsin Intercollegiate Athletic Conference (WIAC) during the 2013 NCAA Division III football season. In their seventh season under head coach Lance Leipold, the Warhawks compiled a perfect 15–0 record and won the NCAA Division III national championship. In the Division III playoffs, they defeated Linfield in the quarterfinal, Mary Hardin–Baylor in the semifinal, and Mount Union in the national championship game.

== Schedule ==
Date	Time	Opponent	Rank	Site	Result	Attendance	Source
September 7	12:00 p.m.	Washington University*	No. 9	Perkins Stadium; Whitewater, WI	W 17–7	4,282	
September 21	12:00 p.m.	at Buffalo State*	No. 15	Coyer Field; Buffalo, NY	W 55–14	521	
September 28	1:00 p.m.	Waldorf*	No. 12	Perkins Stadium; Whitewater, WI	W 65–0	5,218	
October 5	1:05 p.m.	at Wisconsin–La Crosse	No. 12	Veterans Memorial Stadium; La Crosse, WI	W 47–3	2,061	
October 12	2:35 p.m.	Wisconsin–Stout	No. 10	Perkins Stadium; Whitewater, WI	W 55–13	10,528	
October 18	7:00 p.m.	Wisconsin–Eau Claire	No. 10	Perkins Stadium; Whitewater, WI	W 42–0	5,378	
October 26	1:05 p.m.	at No. 9 Wisconsin–Oshkosh	No. 7	J. J. Keller Field; Oshkosh, WI	W 17–14	3,056	
November 2	1:00 p.m.	No. 8 Wisconsin–Platteville^{†}	No. 6	Perkins Stadium; Whitewater, WI	W 35–16	12,028	
November 9	1:00 p.m.	at Wisconsin–Stevens Point	No. 6	Goerke Field; Stevens Point, WI	W 17–7	1,846	
November 16	2:00 p.m.	Wisconsin–River Falls	No. 5	Perkins Stadium; Whitewater, WI	W 43–6	4,386	
November 23	12:00 p.m.	St. Norbert*	No. 5	Perkins Stadium; Whitewater, WI (NCAA Division III First Round)	W 31–7	1,109	
November 30	12:00 p.m.	No. 20 Franklin (IN)*	No. 5	Perkins Stadium; Whitewater, WI (NCAA Division III Second Round)	W 33–3	1,420	
December 7	12:00 p.m.	No. 2 Linfield*	No. 5	Perkins Stadium; Whitewater, WI (NCAA Division III Quarterfinals)	W 28–17	862	
December 14	2:30 p.m.	at No. 3 Mary Hardin–Baylor*	No. 5	Crusader Stadium; Belton, TX (NCAA Division III Semifinals)	W 16–15	4,136	
December 20	7:00 p.m.	vs. No. 1 Mount Union*	No. 5	Salem Football Stadium; Salem, VA (Stagg Bowl)	W 52–14	5,371	
*Non-conference game; ^{†}Homecoming; Rankings from D3Football.com Poll released prior to the game; All times are in Central time

== Rankings ==
Ranking movements Legend: ██ Increase in ranking ██ Decrease in ranking ( ) = First-place votes
	Week												
Poll	Pre	1	2	3	4	5	6	7	8	9	10	11	Final
D3Football.com	9	14	15	12	12	10	10	7	6	6	5	5	1 (25)

== Roster ==
2013 Wisconsin–Whitewater Warhawks football team roster
Players
Coaches
Offense

Pos.	#	Name	Class
WR	1	Jake Kumerow	Jr
WR	2	Tyler Huber	Sr
WR	4	Zach Howard	Sr
RB	6	Ryan Givens	Jr
WR	7	Steve Morris	Sr
WR	8	Coleton Hrgich	So
WR	9	Joe Worth	So
QB	10	Chris Nelson	Fr
WR	11	Justin Howard	Jr
WR	14	Shiloh Weber	Fr
QB	15	Jack Deichl Jr.	Fr
QB	16	Matt Behrendt	Jr
QB	17	Tommy Coughlin	Sr
QB	18	Zack Gehant	Fr
WR	19	Ryan Storto	Fr
RB	26	Booker Ross	Fr
RB	27	Jordan Ratliffe	So
RB	31	Dennis Moore	So
RB	32	Nick Patterson	So
RB	33	Aaron Williamson	Fr
FB	35	Robert Johnson	Fr
FB	46	Kyle Christensen	So
OL	58	Spencer Shier	Fr
C	59	Jamison Cook	Fr
C	60	Conner Peters	So
OL	61	Eli Sloneker	So
OL	65	Austin Jones	Fr
OL	68	Nick Feliciano	So
OL	69	Andrew Keel	Fr
OL	70	Griffin Schaefer	Fr
OL	71	Tyler Janczak	So
OL	72	Johnny Wiederholt	So
OL	73	Pat Suffield	So
OL	74	Evan Kurkowski	So
OL	75	Lucas Skibba	Jr
OL	76	Joe Matuschka	Fr
OL	77	Pat Costello	Fr
OL	78	Nick Ryczek	So
OL	79	Tony Koepnick	Fr
TE	80	Cole Van Schyndel	So
TE	81	Brent Campbell	Fr
TE	83	Andrew Fuller	Fr
TE	84	Chris Davis	Sr
WR	85	Collin Nolen	Fr
WR	86	Brian Washington	So
WR	87	Tommy Miller	Fr
TE	88	Logan Solano	Fr
TE	89	Derric Junakin	Jr

Defense

Pos.	#	Name	Class
DB	1	Mickey Morgan	Fr
DB	3	Marcus McLin	Jr
LB	5	Josh Williams	Sr
DB	6	Nick McCullough	Fr
DB	20	Shawn Shillcox	So
DB	21	Dylan Morang	So
DB	22	Andrew Keister	Sr
LB	23	Joe Paulus	Sr
DB	24	Chris Treptow	So
DB	28	Bennett Young	Fr
DB	29	Zach Mutton	So
DB	30	JD Marconi	Fr
DB	34	Colin Buck	Fr
DB	36	Brady Grayvold	Jr
LB	37	Jordan Strasburg	Fr
LB	38	Jordan Gruettner	Fr
LB	39	Spencer Jacque	So
DB	40	Zach Schober	Fr
DB	42	Ryan Winske	So
DB	43	Brandon Bebow	Fr
LB	44	Cole Klotz	Sr
DB	45	Bryan Spakowicz	Sr
LB	47	Justin Dischler	So
LB	48	Kyle Wismer	Sr
DB	49	Zach Nellis	Jr
LB	50	Ricky Valadez	Fr
LB	51	Paul Foster	Fr
DL	52	Ben Threloff	Fr
LB	53	Ryan Cortez	Sr
LB	54	Jesse DeLorme	Fr
DL	55	Yuri Pogosyan	Fr
LB	56	Matthew Hoppe	So
DL	62	Eric Trautman	Jr
DL	63	Tim Regan	Fr
DL	64	Harry Green	Fr
DL	66	Jordan Edgerson	Fr
DL	67	Nick Froland	So
DL	77	Weston Wegener	Fr
DL	90	Andrew Mulshine	Fr
DL	91	Mykael Bratchett	Jr
DL	92	Kevon Clunis	So
DL	93	Brandon Tamsett	Fr
DL	94	John Flood	Fr
DL	95	Marshall Rutherford	Sr
DL	96	Ryan Kranz	Fr
DL	97	Loussaint Minett	Sr
DL	98	Zach Franz	So

Special teams

Pos.	#	Name	Class
K	13	Lake Bachar	Fr
K	41	Eric Kindler	Sr
LS	82	Zach Koch	So

Head coach

- Lance Leipold

Coordinators/assistant coaches

- Brian Borland – Assistant Head Coach/Defensive Coordinator/Defensive Backs
- Andy Kotelnicki – Offensive Coordinator/Recruiting Coordinator/Quarterbacks Coach
- Kevin Bullis – Defensive Line Coach/Special Teams Coordinator/Run Game Coordinator
- Daryl Agpalsa – Offensive Line Coach
- Alan Hensell – Wide Receivers Coach
- Craig Harmon – Tight Ends Coach
- John Miech – Linebackers Coach
- Tom Karthausser – Running Back Coach
- Pete Kishline – Video Coordinator/Assistant Defensive Coordinator
- Tim Baldry – Director of Equipment, Football and Video Operations
- Jimmy Norris – Student Assistant - Offensive Line
- Kyle Supianoski – Student Assistant - Linebackers
- Christian Harrison – Student Assistant - Defensive Backs
- Luke Menzel – Student Assistant - Quarterbacks/Wide Receivers

Legend

- (C) Team captain
- (S) Suspended
- (I) Ineligible
- Injured
- Redshirt

Roster
