= 2014 Little All-America college football team =

The 2014 Little All-America college football team is composed of college football players from Division II, III, and NAIA schools who were selected by the Associated Press (AP) as the best players at each position.

== First team ==
Position	Player	Team
Offense
Quarterback	Jason Vander Laan	Ferris State
Running back	Terrell Watson	Azusa Pacific
Running back	Anthony Bilal	Lake Erie
Wide receiver	Rasheed Bailey	Delaware Valley
Wide receiver	Keelan Cole	Kentucky Wesleyan
Wide receiver	Darius Davis	Henderson State
Offensive line	Cole Mahnart	Nebraska-Kearney
Offensive line	Matthew Reese	Tuskeegee
Offensive line	Joe Ray	Lenoir-Rhyne
Offensive line	Chris Brinkmeier	Wartburg
Offensive line	Andrew Muer	Minnesota Duluth
Defense
Defensive line	Darius Allen	CSU–Pueblo
Defensive line	Matt Longacre	Northwest Missouri State
Defensive line	Alex Hoff	Linfield
Defensive line	Lucky Baar	McKendree
Linebacker	Tyler Henderson	Minnesota State-Mankato
Linebacker	Sosthene Kapepula	Wesley
Linebacker	Nores Fradi	Wayne State
Defensive back	Satiir Stevenson	Guilford
Defensive back	Solomon St. Pierre	Sioux Falls
Defensive back	Brady Grayvold	Wisconsin-Whitewater
Defensive back	C.J. Roberts	CSU–Pueblo
Special Teams
Kicker	Anthony Pistelli	Valdosta State
Punter	Patrick Carney	New Mexico Highlands
All-purpose	Lavance Taylor	Central Missouri

== See also ==
- 2014 College Football All-America Team
