= 2010 Wisconsin–Whitewater Warhawks football team =

American college football season

2010 Wisconsin–Whitewater Warhawks football

NCAA Division III champion WIAC champion

Stagg Bowl, W 31–21 vs. Mount Union
- Conference: Wisconsin Intercollegiate Athletic Conference

Ranking
- D3Football.com: No. 1
- Record: 15–0 (7–0 WIAC)
- Head coach: Lance Leipold (4th season)
- Offensive coordinator: Steve Dinkel (1st season)
- Offensive scheme: Pro-style
- Defensive coordinator: Brian Borland (9th season)
- Base defense: 4–3
- Home stadium: Perkins Stadium

2010 Wisconsin Intercollegiate Athletic Conference football standings
	Conf.			Overall
Team	W		L	W		L
No. 1 Wisconsin–Whitewater $^	7	–	0	15	–	0
Wisconsin–Stevens Point	5	–	2	7	–	3
Wisconsin–Stout	4	–	3	6	–	4
Wisconsin–Platteville	3	–	4	5	–	5
Wisconsin–Oshkosh	3	–	4	4	–	6
Wisconsin–La Crosse	3	–	4	3	–	7
Wisconsin–Eau Claire	2	–	5	4	–	6
Wisconsin–River Falls	1	–	6	1	–	9
$ – Conference champion; ^ – NCAA Division III playoff participant; Rankings from D3football.com

The 2010 Wisconsin–Whitewater Warhawks football team was an American football team that represented the University of Wisconsin–Whitewater as a member of the Wisconsin Intercollegiate Athletic Conference (WIAC) during the 2010 NCAA Division III football season. In their fourth season under head coach Lance Leipold, the Warhawks compiled a perfect 15–0 record and won the NCAA Division III national championship. In the Division III playoffs, they defeated North Central in the quarterfinal, Wesley in the semifinal, and Mount Union in the 38th annual Stagg Bowl, the Division III national championship game.

Running back Lavell Coppage rushed for 299 yards in the Stagg Bowl and was received the award as the game's most outstanding player.

== Schedule ==
Date	Opponent	Site	Result	Attendance	Source
September 4	Adrian*	Perkins Stadium; Whitewater, WI	W 35–0	6,041	
September 11	Dakota State*	Perkins Stadium; Whitewater, WI	W 70–7	5,489	
September 18	at Campbellsville*	Ron Finley Stadium; Campbellsville, KY	W 37–7	1,000	
September 30	at Wisconsin–Platteville	Ralph E. Davis Stadium; Platteville, WI	W 49–17	3,124	
October 9	Wisconsin–Stout	Perkins Stadium; Whitewater, WI	W 30–7	12,189	
October 16	at Wisconsin–Eau Claire	Carson Park; Eau Claire, WI	W 45–0	4,500	
October 23	at Wisconsin–River Falls	Ramer Field; River Falls, WI	W 63–14	1,373	
October 30	Wisconsin–Stevens Point^{†}	Perkins Stadium; Whitewater, WI	W 27–14	11,448	
November 6	at Wisconsin–Oshkosh	J.J. Keller Field; Oshkosh, WI	W 48–21	1,636	
November 13	Wisconsin–La Crosse	Perkins Stadium; Whitewater, WI	W 24–0	4,681	
November 20	Franklin (IN)*	Perkins Stadium; Whitewater, WI	W 52–21	1,468	
November 27	Trine*	Perkins Stadium; Whitewater, WI	W 45–31	1,472	
December 4	at North Central (IL)*	Benedetti-Wehrli Stadium; Naperville, IL	W 20–10	2,383	
December 11	at Wesley*	Scott D. Miller Stadium; Dover, DE	W 27–7	1,189	
December 18	vs. Mount Union*	Salem Football Stadium; Salem, VA	W 31–21	4,598	
*Non-conference game; ^{†}Homecoming

== Personnel ==
=== Players ===
- 1 Shane Covington DB 5-11 170 So. Milwaukee / Riverside
- 2 Tyler Huber WR 6-1 195 So. Mukwonago / North Prairie
- 3 Aaron Rusch WR 5-11 168 Sr. Hartford / Hartford
- 4 Chris Williams WR 5-10 177 Fr. Bolingbrook, IL / Bolingbrook
- 5 Ryan Wenkman DB 5-10 184 So. Wisconsin Dells / Wisconsin Dells
- 6 Sam Overton DB 5-10 175 Jr. Milwaukee / Riverside
- 7 Steve Morris WR 5-11 182 Fr. Racine / Horlick
- 8 Luke Menzel WR 5-10 178 Fr. Sheboygan Falls / Oostburg
- 9 Steve McCollom DB 6-1 211 Jr. Farmington, MI / Shrine
- 10 Aaron Samplawski DB 5-8 180 Jr. Horicon / Horicon
- 11 Anthony Iannotti QB 6-3 220 Fr. Schaumburg, IL / Schaumburg
- 13 Stephen Guelff ST 5-10 176 Fr. Lake Placid, FL / Lake Placid
- 14 Lee Brekke QB 6-1 195 So. Sun Prairie / Sun Prairie
- 14 Shane Wilson DB 6-2 186 Fr. Glendale / Nicolet
- 15 Matt Blanchard QB 6-3 228 Jr. Lake Zurich, IL / Lake Zurich
- 16 Cory Knapp QB 6-4 187 So. Milwaukee / St. Francis
- 17 Lane Olson DB 5-10 195 Gr. Racine / Horlick
- 18 Kris Rosholt P 6-3 229 Jr. Reedsburg / Reedsburg
- 19 David Leaf WR 5-10 168 Sr. Winona, MN / Winona Cotter
- 20 Nate Angles DB 5-10 180 Fr. Waukesha / West
- 21 Chris Pendergast DB 5-9 167 So. Hartland / Arrowhead
- 22 Andrew Keister DB 6-0 189 Fr. Evansville / Evansville
- 23 Mathew McCulloch DB 6-3 180 Sr. Janesville / Parker
- 24 Antwan Anderson RB 5-10 190 Sr. Madison / Madison Memorial
- 24 Chris Treptow DB 5-10 158 Fr. New Berlin / West
- 26 Edgar Wright RB 6-2 192 Fr. Palatine, IL / Fremd
- 27 Ryan Horne WR 5-11 171 So. Menomonee Falls / Sussex Hamilton
- 27 Ernest James DB 5-10 187 Jr. Madison / West
- 28 Brandon Zolp DB 5-10 174 Fr. Adell / Kewaskum
- 29 Michael Pirtle RB 5-9 167 Fr. Milwaukee / Bradley Tech
- 30 Jared Kiesow DB 5-9 171 Jr. Horicon / Horicon
- 31 Noah Timm DB 5-11 174 So. Two Rivers / Two Rivers
- 32 Booker Stanley RB 5-9 215 Sr. Milwaukee / Whitefish Bay
- 33 Levell Coppage RB 5-8 180 Jr. Oak Park, IL / Oak Park
- 34 Spencer Burns FB 6-0 217 Fr. Auburn, IN / Garrett
- 35 Bernie Tamsett FB 6-0 211 So. Waterford / Waterford Union
- 36 Levi Johnson RB 5-7 161 Fr. River Falls / River Falls
- 37 Jake Reidel FB 5-9 217 Jr. South Milwaukee / South Milwaukee
- 38 Jack Sheetz FB 6-2 240 Fr. Barrington, IL / Barrington
- 39 Ronnie Blaszkowski DB 5-10 170 So. Oak Park River Forest, IL / Oak Park
- 40 Josh Wiggins LB 6-1 206 Fr. Ashton, IL / Oregon
- 41 Eric Kindler ST 6-0 173 Fr. Germantown / Germantown
- 42 Stephan Jonsson LB 6-0 210 Sr. Spain / Argeniona Bocs
- 43 Jaren Borland LB 6-1 216 So. Fort Atkinson / Fort Atkinson
- 44 Cole Klotz LB 6-4 206 Fr. Elm Grove / New Berlin Eisenhower
- 45 Bryan Spakowcz LB 5-11 202 Fr. Pewaukee / Pewaukee
- 46 Kevin Gorman WR 6-2 185 Fr. Wauwatosa / West
- 47 Brad Slomkowski LB 6-0 198 Fr. Kenosha / Bradford
- 48 Kyle Wismer LB 6-3 188 Fr. Spring Grove, IL / Richmond-Burton
- 49 Matt Preissner DB 5-10 181 Fr. Fond du Lac / New Holstein
- 50 Oscar Johnson LB 5-9 235 Fr. Milwaukee / Riverside
- 51 Greg Arnold LB 6-2 224 Jr. Big Bend / Mukwonago
- 52 Max Ford LB 6-0 210 Sr. Oak Park, IL / Oak Park River Forest
- 53 Luke Hibner DL 6-1 240 Sr. Elmhurst, IL / York Community
- 54 Kevin Utz DL 6-2 245 Jr. New Berlin / Eisenhower
- 55 Josh Williams LB 6-1 224 So. Milwaukee / Mukwonago
- 56 Jake Keeser DL 6-0 230 Jr. Fort Atkinson / Fort Atkinson
- 57 Hans Goldenberg LB 6-0 218 So. River Forest, IL / Oak Park River Forest
- 58 Joe Hansen OL 6-1 256 So. Greendale / Greendale
- 59 Anthony Bounds LB 5-10 228 Fr. Milwaukee / Riverside
- 60 Nick Endres DL 6-0 272 So. Waunakee / Waunakee
- 61 Taylor Witty DL 6-2 244 Fr. Milwaukee / Lutheran
- 62 Ryan Olson OL 6-2 275 Jr. Stoughton / Stoughton
- 63 Grant Murray OL 6-2 240 Sr. Waukesha / Homestead
- 64 Alex Misialek OL 6-4 315 Jr. Crystal Lake, IL / Crystal Lake South
- 65 Jimmy Norris OL 6-2 281 So. Palatine, IL / William Fremd
- 66 Mark Gawronski OL 6-0 270 Sr. New Berlin / Eisenhower
- 67 Kyle Mathison OL 6-0 240 So. Belvidere, IL / Belvidere
- 68 Kevin Rickert DL 6-2 228 Fr. Green Bay / Bay Port
- 69 Joe Cychner DL 5-11 275 Fr. Genoa City / Lake Geneva Badger
- 70 Grant Poenitsch OL 6-2 270 So. Sussex / Hamilton
- 71 KJ Flynn OL 6-4 270 So. Saukville / Port Washington
- 72 Andy Schmidt OL 6-4 242 Fr. St. Francis / St. Francis
- 73 Ian Wilson OL 6-0 259 So. Richland Center / Richland Center
- 74 Mike Pregont OL 6-3 255 Fr. Janesville / Craig
- 75 Robbie Ustruck OL 6-2 280 Sr. West Allis / Hale
- 76 Jake Wahl OL 6-2 235 So. Cudahy / Cudahy
- 77 Matt Weber OL 6-3 285 Sr. Oregon / Oregon
- 78 Jared Berg OL 6-5 284 Fr. Hudson / Hudson
- 79 Logan Allemand OL 6-3 294 Jr. Kenosha / Tremper
- 80 Ian McKechnie WR 5-9 163 Fr. New Berlin / Eisenhower
- 81 Derric Junakin TE 6-4 264 Fr. Cudahy / Cudahy
- 82 Adam Brandes WR 6-3 186 Sr. Burlington / Catholic Central
- 83 Joel McElvany WR 6-4 242 So. Monroe / Monroe
- 84 Jason Ford TE 6-3 215 Jr. Palatine, IL / Fremd
- 85 Matt Winckler TE 6-4 237 Fr. DeForest / DeForest
- 86 Chad McCarron WR 6-3 200 Fr. Cary, IL / Cary Grove
- 87 Anton Graham TE 6-3 251 Jr. Racine / Park
- 88 Robert Serdar TE 6-3 224 So. Zion Benton Township /
- 89 John Novak TE 6-5 278 Sr. Michigan City, IN / Michigan City
- 90 Johan Lorenzo DL 6-3 235 So. Hialeah, FL / Hialeah Senior
- 91 Jon Baldwin DL 6-3 247 Sr. Spring Grove, IL / Richmond Burton
- 92 Zack Cook DL 6-0 260 Jr. Necedah / Necedah
- 93 Anthony Dowery DL 6-0 260 So. Milwaukee / South Division
- 94 Tom Egan DL 6-0 255 Fr. Coon Rapids, MN / Coon Rapids
- 95 Wesley Hicks DL 6-3 274 Sr. Milwaukee / Vincent
- 96 Gabe Woullard DL 6-2 195 Fr. Oak Park, IL / Oak Park River Forest
- 97 Loussaint Minett DL 5-11 213 Fr. Whitewater / Whitewater
- 98 Jake Hohlstein DL 6-1 275 So. Portage / Portage
- 99 Casey Casper DL 6-4 237 Jr. Dousman / Kettle Moraine

=== Coaching staff ===
- Head coach: Lance Leipold
- Athletic director: Paul Plinske
- Assistant coaches

Brian Borland (defensive coordinator)
Steve Dinkel (offensive coordinator)
Nelson Edmonds (special teams coordinator and running backs coach)
Kevin Bullis (defensive run game coordinator)
Dan Brunner (tight ends coach)
Jace Rindahl (linebackers coach)
Tom Karthausser (defensive ends coach)
Josh Gehring (quarterbacks coach and pass game coordinator)
Lee Munger (strength and conditioning)
