= 2009 Wisconsin–Whitewater Warhawks football team =

American college football season

2009 Wisconsin–Whitewater Warhawks football

NCAA Division III champion WIAC champion

Stagg Bowl, W 38–28 vs. Mount Union
- Conference: Wisconsin Intercollegiate Athletic Conference

Ranking
- D3Football.com: No. 1
- Record: 15–0 (7–0 WIAC)
- Head coach: Lance Leipold (3rd season)
- Offensive coordinator: Jim Zebrowski (3rd season)
- Offensive scheme: Pro-style
- Defensive coordinator: Brian Borland (8th season)
- Base defense: 4–3
- Home stadium: Perkins Stadium

2009 Wisconsin Intercollegiate Athletic Conference football standings
	Conf.			Overall
Team	W		L	W		L
No. 1 Wisconsin–Whitewater $^	7	–	0	15	–	0
Wisconsin–Stevens Point	6	–	1	7	–	3
Wisconsin–Stout	5	–	2	8	–	2
Wisconsin–Eau Claire	4	–	3	6	–	4
Wisconsin–La Crosse	2	–	5	5	–	5
Wisconsin–Oshkosh	2	–	5	4	–	6
Wisconsin–Platteville	1	–	6	3	–	7
Wisconsin–River Falls	1	–	6	3	–	7
$ – Conference champion; ^ – NCAA Division III playoff participant; Rankings from D3football.com

The 2009 Wisconsin–Whitewater Warhawks football team was an American football team that represented the University of Wisconsin–Whitewater as a member of the Wisconsin Intercollegiate Athletic Conference (WIAC) during the 2009 NCAA Division III football season. In their third season under head coach Lance Leipold, the Warhawks compiled a perfect 15–0 record and won the NCAA Division III national championship. In the Division III playoffs, they defeated Wittenberg in the quarterfinal, Linfield in the semifinal, and Mount Union in the national championship game.

== Schedule ==
Date	Opponent	Site	Result	Attendance	Source
September 5	at Dickinson State*	Fischer Stadium; Dickinson, ND	W 38–3	1,953	
September 12	Midland Lutheran*	Perkins Stadium; Whitewater, WI	W 58–0	5,569	
September 26	Puget Sound*	Perkins Stadium; Whitewater, WI	W 42–7	4,127	
October 3	Wisconsin–Platteville	Perkins Stadium; Whitewater, WI	W 35–3	9,157	
October 10	Wisconsin–Eau Claire	Perkins Stadium; Whitewater, WI	W 38–14	4,017	
October 17	at Wisconsin–Stout	Williams Stadium; Menomonie, WI	W 38–3	2,236	
October 24	Wisconsin–River Falls^{†}	Perkins Stadium; Whitewater, WI	W 38–14	8,169	
October 31	at Wisconsin–Stevens Point	Community Stadium at Goerke Park; Stevens Point, WI	W 41–12	1,325	
November 7	Wisconsin–Oshkosh	Perkins Stadium; Whitewater, WI	W 40–7	5,040	
November 14	at Wisconsin–La Crosse	Veterans Memorial Stadium; La Crosse, WI	W 58–21	2,038	
November 21	Lakeland*	Perkins Stadium; Whitewater, WI	W 70–7	1,848	
November 28	Illinois Wesleyan*	Perkins Stadium; Whitewater, WI	W 45–7	2,349	
December 5	Wittenberg*	Perkins Stadium; Whitewater, WI (NCAA Division III quarterfinal)	W 31–13	2,021	
December 12	Linfield*	Perkins Stadium; Whitewater, WI (NCAA Division III semifinal)	W 27–17	2,223	
December 19	vs. Mount Union*	Salem Football Stadium; Salem, VA (Stagg Bowl)	W 38–28	3,468	
*Non-conference game; ^{†}Homecoming

== Roster ==
2009 Wisconsin–Whitewater Warhawks football team roster
Players
Coaches
Offense

Pos.	#	Name	Class
WR	1	Cory Robinson	Jr
RB	2	CJ Miller	Jr
WR	3	Aaron Rusch	Jr
WR	4	Zach Howard	Fr
QB	5	Jeff Donovan	Sr
WR	8	Jordan Wells	Sr
QB	9	Steve McCollom	So
WR	14	Mike Przespolewski	Fr
QB	15	Matt Blanchard	So
QB	16	Cory Knapp	Fr
WR	19	David Leaf	Jr
RB	22	LaVell Hewlett	Fr
RB	24	Antwan Anderson	Jr
WR	27	Jose Munoz	Fr
RB	33	Levell Coppage	So
RB	34	Mike Taylor	Fr
FB	35	Bernie Tamsett	Fr
FB	36	Max Wasikowski	Sr
FB	37	Jake Taylor	So
FB	38	Anthony Dowery	Fr
WR	49	Zach Hintz	Fr
OL	57	Garth Coats	Sr
OL	58	Joe Hansen	Fr
OL	62	Ryan Olson	So
OL	63	Grant Murray	Jr
OL	64	Alex Misialek	So
OL	65	Jimmy Norris	Fr
OL	66	Mark Gawronski	Jr
OL	68	Tayler Erbach	Fr
OL	69	James Boutelle	Fr
OL	70	Grant Poenitsch	Fr
OL	71	KJ Flynn	Fr
OL	72	Patrick Lyons	Fr
OL	73	Ian Wilson	Fr
OL	74	Steve Braatz	Fr
OL	75	Robbie Ustruck	Jr
OL	76	Chris Smolko	So
OL	77	Matt Weber	Jr
OL	79	Logan Allemand	So
WR	80	Terrence Fitch	Sr
WR	81	Mike Picciolo	Fr
WR	82	Adam Brandes	Jr
WR	83	Brian Gensrick	So
TE	84	Jason Ford	So
TE	85	Zach Glasebrook	Fr
TE	86	Jake Wahl	Fr
TE	87	Anton Graham	So
TE	88	Robert Serdar	Fr
TE	89	John Novak	Jr

Defense

Pos.	#	Name	Class
DB	6	Sam Overton	So
DB	7	Troney Shumpert	Sr
DB	10	Aaron Samplawski	So
DB	13	Tim Cook	Fr
DB	17	Lane Olson	Sr
DB	20	Jeremy Deibert	Sr
DB	21	Chris Pendergast	Fr
DB	23	Mathew McCulloch	Jr
DB	26	Dan Bower	Fr
DB	27	Graham Hall	Sr
DB	28	Derek Underwood	Sr
DB	29	Zach Christopherson	Sr
DB	30	Jared Kiesow	So
DB	31	Paul Wick	Sr
DB	32	Brandon Shaw	Fr
DB	39	Ronnie Blaszkowski	Fr
DB	40	Kyle Heller	Fr
LB	41	Sean Fancher	So
LB	42	Stephan Jonsson	Jr
LB	43	Kyle Supianoski	Sr
DB	44	Jordan Pethan	Fr
LB	45	Joe Weber	Fr
LB	46	Devon Showers	Fr
LB	47	Joe Paulus	Fr
LB	48	Ryan Cortez	Fr
LB	50	Matt Pingel	Fr
LB	51	Greg Arnold	So
LB	52	Max Ford	Jr
DL	53	Luke Hibner	Jr
DL	54	Kevin Utz	So
LB	55	Josh Williams	Fr
DL	56	Jake Keeser	So
DL	59	Jacob Plewa	Fr
LB	60	Tim Depies	Sr
LB	61	Vince Lang	Fr
DL	67	Matt Kurudza	Sr
DL	75	Zack Cook	So
DL	78	Chris Kneeland	So
DL	90	Mike Zielinski	Fr
DL	91	Jon Baldwin	Jr
DL	92	Jovon Dixon	Sr
DL	93	Justin Ankley	Sr
DL	94	Kyle Zabel	Jr
DL	95	Wesley Hicks	Jr
DL	96	Travis Young	Fr
DL	97	Anthony White	Sr
DL	98	Jake Holstein	Fr
DL	99	Casey Casper	So

Special teams

Pos.	#	Name	Class
K	11	Jeff Schebler	Sr
P	14	Jake Kusters	So
P	18	Kris Rosholt	So

Head coach

- Lance Leipold

Coordinators/assistant coaches

- Brian Borland – Defensive Coordinator
- Jim Zebrowski – Offensive Coordinator
- Steve Dinkel – Assistant Coach
- Nelson Edmonds – Assistant Coach
- Kevin Bullis – Assistant Coach
- Dan Brunner – Assistant Coach
- Jace Rindahl – Assistant Coach
- Kurt Ware – Assistant Coach
- Tom Karthausser – Assistant Coach
- Andy Harris – Director of Football Operations
- Tim Baldry – Student Assistant
- CJ Hill – Student Assistant
- Danny Jones – Student Assistant
- Alex Polster – Student Assistant

Legend

- (C) Team captain
- (S) Suspended
- (I) Ineligible
- Injured
- Redshirt

Roster
