= 2014 Wisconsin–Whitewater Warhawks football team =

American college football season

2014 Wisconsin–Whitewater Warhawks football

NCAA Division III champion WIAC champion

Stagg Bowl, W 43–34 vs. Mount Union
- Conference: Wisconsin Intercollegiate Athletic Conference

Ranking
- D3Football.com: No. 1
- Record: 15–0 (7–0 WIAC)
- Head coach: Lance Leipold (8th season)
- Offensive coordinator: Andy Kotelnicki (2nd season)
- Offensive scheme: Multiple pro-style / spread
- Defensive coordinator: Brian Borland (13th season)
- Base defense: 4–3
- Home stadium: Perkins Stadium

2014 Wisconsin Intercollegiate Athletic Conference football standings
	Conf.			Overall
Team	W		L	W		L
No. 1 Wisconsin–Whitewater $^	7	–	0	15	–	0
No. 20 Wisconsin–Oshkosh	6	–	1	6	–	4
Wisconsin–Platteville	5	–	2	7	–	3
Wisconsin–Stevens Point	4	–	3	7	–	3
Wisconsin–La Crosse	2	–	5	3	–	7
Wisconsin–River Falls	2	–	5	3	–	7
Wisconsin–Stout	1	–	6	2	–	8
Wisconsin–Eau Claire	1	–	6	1	–	9
$ – Conference champion; ^ – NCAA Division III playoff participant; Rankings from D3football.com

The 2014 Wisconsin–Whitewater Warhawks football team was an American football team that represented the University of Wisconsin–Whitewater as a member of the Wisconsin Intercollegiate Athletic Conference (WIAC) during the 2014 NCAA Division III football season. In their eighth and final season under head coach Lance Leipold, the Warhawks compiled a perfect 15–0 record and won the NCAA Division III national championship. In the Division III playoffs, they defeated Wartburg in the quarterfinal, Linfield in the semifinal, and Mount Union in the national championship game. It was Whitewater's sixth national championship in eight years.

== Schedule ==
Date	Opponent	Site	Result	Attendance	Source
September 5	Waldorf*	Perkins Stadium; Whitewater, WI	W 73–7	7,138	
September 13	at Franklin*	Faught Stadium; Franklin, IN	W 42–13	3,250	
September 20	at TCNJ*	Lions Stadium	W 48–0	982	
October 4	Wisconsin–La Crosse	Perkins Stadium; Whitewater, WI	W 38–7	10,890	
October 11	at Wisconsin–Stout	Williams Stadium; Menomonie, WI	W 37–0	3,641	
October 18	at Wisconsin–Eau Claire	Carson Park; Eau Claire, WI	W 52–3	3,647	
October 25	Wisconsin–Oshkosh^{†}	Perkins Stadium; Whitewater, WI	W 24–7	13,627	
November 1	at Wisconsin–Platteville	Pioneer Stadium; Platteville, WI	W 17–7	6,723	
November 8	Wisconsin–Stevens Point	Perkins Stadium; Whitewater, WI	W 49–17	6,049	
November 15	at Wisconsin–River Falls	Ramer Field; River Falls, WI	W 28–25	258	
November 22	Macalester*	Perkins Stadium; Whitewater, WI (NCAA Division III first round)	W 55–2	1,100	
November 29	Wabash*	Perkins Stadium; Whitewater, WI (NCAA Division III second round)	W 38–14	1,100	
December 6	Wartburg*	Perkins Stadium; Whitewater, WI (NCAA Division III quarterfinal)	W 37–33	1,790	
December 13	Linfield*	Perkins Stadium; Whitewater, WI (NCAA Division III semifinal)	W 20–14	1,942	
December 19	vs. Mount Union*	Salem Football Stadium; Salem, VA (Stagg Bowl)	W 43–34	5,465	
*Non-conference game; ^{†}Homecoming

== Roster ==
2014 Wisconsin–Whitewater Warhawks football team roster
Players
Coaches
Offense

Pos.	#	Name	Class
WR	1	Jake Kumerow	Sr
WR	2	Steve Street	Fr
WR	4	Clayton Bjornsen	Fr
WR	5	Ricky Finco	Fr
RB	6	Ryan Givens	Sr
WR	7	Marcus Hudson	Fr
WR	8	Coleton Hrgich	Jr
WR	9	Joe Worth	Jr
QB	10	Chris Nelson	So
WR	11	Justin Howard	Sr
QB	14	Ryan Curran	Fr
QB	16	Matt Behrendt	Sr
QB	18	Zack Gehant	So
WR	19	Ryan Storto	So
RB	22	Nick Patterson	Jr
RB	27	Jordan Ratliffe	Jr
RB	31	Dennis Moore	Jr
RB	32	Dom Garza	Fr
RB	33	SaQuan Dowery	Fr
RB	40	Ty Jager	Fr
RB	41	Eric Wade	Fr
FB	46	Kyle Christensen	Jr
OL	55	Chris Runjo	Fr
OL	58	Spencer Shier	So
C	60	Conner Peters	Jr
OL	61	Eli Sloneker	Jr
OL	65	Austin Jones	So
OL	66	Mitchell Schauer	Fr
OL	67	Ricardo Ramos	Fr
OL	68	Paul Jacobson Jr.	Fr
OL	69	Andrew Keel	So
OL	70	John Best	Fr
OL	72	Johnny Wiederholt	Jr
OL	73	Pat Suffield	Jr
OL	74	Nick Wewetzer	Fr
OL	75	Ben McFall	Fr
OL	76	Jacob Meyer	Fr
OL	77	Pat Costello	So
OL	78	Jordan Mueller	Fr
OL	79	Tony Koepnick	So
TE	80	Tony Gumina	Fr
TE	81	Brent Campbell	So
WR	82	Jordan Zwart	Fr
TE	83	Andrew Fuller	So
WR	85	Adam Korpela	Fr
WR	86	Freddy Bobo	Fr
TE	87	Bryce Bellefeuille	Fr
TE	88	Logan Solano	So
TE	89	Derric Junakin	Sr

Defense

Pos.	#	Name	Class
DB	2	Mickey Morgan	So
DB	3	Marcus McLin	Sr
DB	4	Vince Mason	So
DB	9	Isaiah Shell	Fr
DL	17	Kevon Clunis	Jr
DB	20	Shawn Shillcox	Jr
DB	21	Dylan Morang	Jr
DB	23	Jim Solberg	So
DB	24	Jake Gierlak	Fr
DB	26	Bailey Breunig	Fr
DB	28	Bennett Young	So
DB	29	Antwon Mosley	Fr
DB	30	Tyler Oakley	Fr
DB	33	Brett Buehler	Fr
DB	34	Colin Buck	So
LB	35	Kyle Schiedemeyer	Fr
DB	36	Brady Grayvold	Sr
LB	37	Jordan Strasburg	So
LB	38	Antwane Bounds	Fr
LB	39	Spencer Jacque	Jr
DB	42	Ryan Winske	Jr
DB	43	Brandon Bebow	So
LB	44	Matt Seitz	Fr
LB	45	Beau Martin	Fr
LB	47	Justin Dischler	Jr
LB	48	Riley Tutas	So
DB	49	Zach Nellis	Sr
LB	51	Paul Foster	So
DL	52	Ben Threloff	So
LB	53	Andrew Venerable	Fr
LB	54	Zach Mutton	Jr
LB	56	Matthew Hoppe	Jr
LB	57	Zach Smith	Fr
DL	59	Sam Nelson	Fr
DL	62	Josh Hilt	Fr
DL	63	James Millette	Fr
DL	64	Zak Kurtz	So
DL	71	Roman Jackson III	Fr
DL	75	Dalton Heckel	Fr
DL	90	Peter Mitchell	Fr
DL	91	Mykaell Bratchett	Sr
DL	92	Nick Froland	Jr
DL	93	Brandon Tamsett	So
DL	94	John Flood	So
DL	95	Tim Regan	So
DL	96	Yuri Pogosyan	So
DL	97	Hunter Higginbotham	Fr
DL	98	Zach Franz	Jr
DL	99	Trevor Boyle	So

Special teams

Pos.	#	Name	Class
K	13	Lake Bachar	So
K	15	Will Meyer	Fr
LS	55	Zach Koch	Jr

Head coach

- Lance Leipold

Coordinators/assistant coaches

- Brian Borland – Assistant Head Coach/Defensive Coordinator
- Andy Kotelnicki – Recruiting Coordinator/Offensive Coordinator
- Kevin Bullis – Defensive Run Game Coordinator/Line Coach
- Daryl Agpalsa – Offensive Line Coach
- Alan Hensell – Wide Receivers Coach
- John Miech – Linebackers Coach
- John O'Grady – Special Teams Coach
- Kyle Supianoski – Running Back Coach
- Kyle Jacobo – Tight Ends Coach
- Pete Kishline – Video Coordinator/Defensive Tackles
- Tim Baldry – Director of Equipment and Football Operations
- Tyler Pierce – Graduate Assistant - Offensive Line
- Christian Harrison – Graduate Assistant - Defensive Backs
- Kevin O'Neill – Student Assistant - Quarterbacks

Legend

- (C) Team captain
- (S) Suspended
- (I) Ineligible
- Injured
- Redshirt

Roster
