= 2011 Wisconsin–Whitewater Warhawks football team =

American college football season

2011 Wisconsin–Whitewater Warhawks football

NCAA Division III champion WIAC champion

Stagg Bowl, W 13–10 vs. Mount Union
- Conference: Wisconsin Intercollegiate Athletic Conference

Ranking
- D3Football.com: No. 1
- Record: 15–0 (7–0 WIAC)
- Head coach: Lance Leipold (5th season)
- Offensive coordinator: Steve Dinkel (2nd season)
- Offensive scheme: Pro-style
- Defensive coordinator: Brian Borland (10th season)
- Base defense: 4–3
- Home stadium: Perkins Stadium

2011 Wisconsin Intercollegiate Athletic Conference football standings
	Conf.			Overall
Team	W		L	W		L
No. 1 Wisconsin–Whitewater $^	7	–	0	15	–	0
Wisconsin–Oshkosh	5	–	2	7	–	3
Wisconsin–Platteville	5	–	2	7	–	3
Wisconsin–Eau Claire	3	–	4	5	–	5
Wisconsin–Stout	3	–	4	5	–	5
Wisconsin–Stevens Point	2	–	5	4	–	6
Wisconsin–La Crosse	2	–	5	3	–	7
Wisconsin–River Falls	1	–	6	1	–	9
$ – Conference champion; ^ – NCAA Division III playoff participant; Rankings from D3football.com

The 2011 Wisconsin–Whitewate Warhawks football team was an American football team that represented the University of Wisconsin–Whitewater as a member of the Wisconsin Intercollegiate Athletic Conference (WIAC) during the 2011 NCAA Division III football season. In their fifth season under head coach Lance Leipold, the Warhawks compiled a perfect 15–0 record and won the NCAA Division III national championship. In the Division III playoffs, they defeated Salisbury in the quarterfinal, St. Thomas in the semifinal, and Mount Union in the national championship game.

== Schedule ==
Date	Opponent	Site	Result	Attendance	Source
September 3	at Wisconsin–La Crosse	Veterans Memorial Stadium; La Crosse, WI	W 26–7	3,263	
September 10	at Franklin (IN)*	Faught Stadium; Franklin, IN	W 45–0	3,175	
September 17	Campbellsville*	Perkins Stadium; Whitewater, WI	W 54–14	6,823	
October 1	Wisconsin–Platteville	Perkins Stadium; Whitewater, WI	W 34–14	10,622	
October 8	at Wisconsin–River Falls	Ramer Field; River Falls, WI	W 42–10	3,621	
October 14	Wisconsin–Stout	Perkins Stadium; Whitewater, WI	W 42–21	6,209	
October 22	at Wisconsin–Oshkosh	J.J. Keller Field; Oshkosh, WI	W 20–17	3,863	
October 29	Wisconsin–Stevens Point^{†}	Perkins Stadium; Whitewater, WI	W 31–16	10,308	
November 5	at Wisconsin–Eau Claire	Carson Park; Eau Claire, WI	W 37–22	2,865	
November 12	Wisconsin-La Crosse	Perkins Stadium; Whitewater, WI	W 17–3	6,237	
November 19	Albion*	Perkins Stadium; Whitewater, WI (NCAA Division III first round)	W 59–0	1,275	
November 26	Franklin*	Perkins Stadium; Whitewater, WI (NCAA Division III second round)	W 41–14	1,087	
December 3	Salisbury*	Perkins Stadium; Whitewater, WI (NCAA Division II quarterfinal)	W 34–14	1,112	
December 10	St. Thomas*	Perkins Stadium; Whitewater, WI (NCAA Division III semifinal)	W 20–0	2,902	
December 16	vs. Mount Union*	Salem Football Stadium; Salem, VA (Stagg Bowl)	W 13–10	3,784	
*Non-conference game; ^{†}Homecoming

== Roster ==
2011 Wisconsin–Whitewater Warhawks football team roster
Players
Coaches
Offense

Pos.	#	Name	Class
WR	2	Tyler Huber	Jr
WR	4	Zach Howard	So
WR	7	Steve Morris	So
WR	8	Luke Menzel	So
WR	11	Cory Robinson	Sr
QB	13	Kevin O'Neill	Fr
QB	14	Lee Brekke	Jr
QB	15	Matt Blanchard	Sr
QB	16	Matt Behrendt	Fr
QB	17	Tommy Coughlin	So
WR	19	Brian Gensrick	Sr
WR	20	Madison Fernandez	So
RB	23	Byron Stanford	Fr
RB	24	Colton Sweitzer	Fr
RB	26	Edgar Wright	So
RB	28	Desmin Ward	Jr
RB	33	Levell Coppage	Sr
FB	34	Ryan Hines	Fr
FB	35	Bernie Tamsett	Jr
FB	36	Kominiko Sila	So
FB	37	Nick Romani	Fr
FB	38	Cody Weaver	Fr
OL	58	Joe Hansen	Jr
OL	60	Jason Zobel	Fr
OL	61	Pat Suffield	Fr
OL	62	Ryan Olson	Sr
OL	64	Alex Misialek	Sr
OL	65	Jimmy Norris	Jr
OL	66	Bob Braam	Fr
OL	70	Grant Poenitsch	Jr
OL	71	Ryan Patterson	Fr
OL	72	Jake Borgardt	Fr
OL	73	Mike Seefeld	Jr
OL	74	Phil Kinjerski	Fr
OL	75	Lucas Skibba	Fr
OL	76	Jake Wahl	Jr
OL	77	Derek Patten	Fr
OL	78	Jared Berg	So
OL	79	Logan Allemand	Sr
WR	80	Evan Walton	Fr
WR	81	Cameron Blair	Fr
WR	82	Zac Michael	Fr
TE	84	Jason Ford	Sr
TE	85	Matt Gust	Fr
TE	86	Garrett Rietveld	Fr
TE	87	Lucas Davis	So
TE	88	Robert Serdar	Jr
TE	89	Mike Hall	So

Defense

Pos.	#	Name	Class
DB	1	Shane Covington	Jr
DB	2	Chris Millard	Fr
DB	3	Marcus McLin	Fr
DB	5	Ryan Wenkman	Jr
DB	6	Sam Overton	Sr
DB	9	Jesse Hamilton	Sr
DB	21	Chris Pendergast	Jr
DB	22	Andrew Keister	So
DB	27	Ernest James	Sr
DB	29	Nick Miller	So
DB	30	Jared Kiesow	Sr
DB	31	Noah Timm	Jr
DB	32	Ryan Winske	Fr
DB	39	Ronnie Blaszkowski	Jr
DB	40	Tommy Kolzow	Fr
DB	42	Brian McClain	Fr
LB	43	Jaren Borland	Jr
LB	44	Cole Klotz	So
LB	45	Bryan Spakowcz	So
LB	46	Spencer Jacque	Fr
LB	47	Justin Dischler	Fr
LB	48	Kyle Wismer	So
DB	49	Zach Nellis	Fr
LB	50	Oscar Johnson	So
LB	51	Greg Arnold	Sr
LB	52	Nick Erickson	So
LB	53	Ryan Cortez	So
DL	54	Kevin Utz	Sr
LB	55	Josh Williams	Jr
DL	56	Jake Keeser	Sr
LB	57	Joe Paulus	So
DL	59	Anthony Bounds	So
DL	63	Trevor Boyle	Fr
DL	67	Johnny Wiederholt	Fr
DL	68	Brett Oesterle	Fr
DL	69	Matt Helman	Fr
DL	83	Brandon Zimmerman	Fr
DL	90	Johan Lorenzo	Jr
DL	91	Mykael Bratchett	Fr
DL	92	Zack Cook	Sr
DL	93	Dean Smith	Fr
DL	94	Dustin Austin	Fr
DL	95	Nick Walker	Fr
DL	96	Anthony Dowery	Jr
DL	97	Loussaint Minett	So
DL	98	Jake Hohlstein	Jr
DL	99	Casey Casper	Sr

Special teams

Pos.	#	Name	Class
PK	10	Randy Hill	Fr
P	18	Kris Rosholt	Sr
PK	41	Eric Kindler	So

Head coach

- Lance Leipold

Coordinators/assistant coaches

- Brian Borland – Defensive Coordinator
- Steve Dinkel – Offensive Coordinator
- Kevin Bullis – Assistant Coach
- Nelson Edmonds – Assistant Coach
- Josh Gehring – Assistant Coach
- Tom Karthausser – Assistant Coach
- Jace Rindahl – Assistant Coach
- Mitch Moore – Wide Receivers Coach
- Tim Baldry – Assistant Offensive Line Coach/Video Coordinator
- Luke Groth – Director of Football Operations/Equipment Manager

Legend

- (C) Team captain
- (S) Suspended
- (I) Ineligible
- Injured
- Redshirt

Roster
