= Chris Rusiewicz =

American football coach

Current position
- Title: Head coach
- Team: Northwest Guilford HS (NC)
- Record: 16–5

Biographical details
- Born: Quakertown, Pennsylvania, U.S.
- Education: Shippensburg University of Pennsylvania; DeSales University (2001)

Playing career
- ?: Shippensburg
- Position: Running back

Coaching career (HC unless noted)
- 1997–2004: Eastern Pennsylvania Scorpions (OC)
- 2001–2002: Ursinus (DB)
- 2003–2006: Ursinus (DC)
- 2007: Ursinus (assoc. HC/DC)
- 2008–2010: Ursinus (assoc. HC/DC/ST)
- 2011–2019: Guilford
- 2020–2021: Northern Guilford HS (NC) (DC)
- 2022: Greensboro (DC)
- 2023–present: Northwest Guilford HS (NC)

Administrative career (AD unless noted)
- 1997–2004: Eastern Pennsylvania Scorpions (GM)

Head coaching record
- Overall: 44–45 (college); 16–5 (high school)

Accomplishments and honors

Championships
- 1 ODAC (2014)

Awards
- AFCA Assistant Coach of the Year (2010)

Christopher Rusiewicz is an American college football coach. He is the head football coach for Northwest Guilford High School, a position he has held since 2023. He was the head football coach for Guilford College from 2011 to 2019 and finished his tenure as the school's all-time winningest coach. He also coached for the semi-professional Eastern Pennsylvania Scorpions, Ursinus, Northern Guilford High School, and Greensboro. He played college football for Shippensburg as a running back.

In 2010, Rusiewicz was named AFCA Assistant Coach of the Year.

== Head coaching record ==
=== College ===
Year	Team	Overall	Conference	Standing	Bowl/playoffs
Guilford Quakers (Old Dominion Athletic Conference) (2011–2019)
2011	Guilford	2–8	1–5	T–6th	
2012	Guilford	5–5	4–3	T–3rd	
2013	Guilford	6–4	5–2	T–2nd	
2014	Guilford	8–2	5–2	T–1st	
2015	Guilford	9–1	6–1	2nd	
2016	Guilford	4–6	1–6	7th	
2017	Guilford	5–5	3–3	T–4th	
2018	Guilford	3–6	2–5	8th	
2019	Guilford	2–8	1–7	8th	
Guilford:		44–45	28–34		
Total:		44–45			

=== High school ===
Year	Team	Overall	Conference	Standing	Bowl/playoffs
Northwest Guilford Vikings () (2023–present)
2023	Northwest Guilford	8–3	6–1	2nd	
2024	Northwest Guilford	8–2	5–2	3rd	
Northwest Guilford:		16–5	11–3		
Total:		16–5			
