= Andy Kotelnicki =

American football coach (born 1980)

Current position
- Title: Associate head coach
- Team: Kansas
- Conference: Big 12

Biographical details
- Born: September 2, 1980 (age 46); Litchfield, Minnesota, U.S.

Playing career
- 2001–2003: Wisconsin–River Falls
- Position: Center

Coaching career (HC unless noted)
- 2004–2005: Western Illinois (OA)
- 2006–2010: Wisconsin–River Falls (OC)
- 2011–2012: University of Mary (OC)
- 2013–2014: Wisconsin–Whitewater (OC)
- 2015–2020: Buffalo (OC)
- 2021–2023: Kansas (OC)
- 2024–2025: Penn State (OC)
- 2026–present: Kansas (AHC)

Andrew Earl Kotelnicki (/ˌkoʊtɪlˈnɪkiː/ ko-til-NI-kee; born September 2, 1980) is an American football coach who is the associate head coach at the University of Kansas. He previously served as the offensive coordinator at Pennsylvania State University from 2024 to 2025. Before that he served as the offensive coordinator at the University of Kansas from 2021 to 2023. Kotelnicki played college football at the University of Wisconsin–River Falls as a center before entering coaching.

== Early life and playing career ==
Kotelnicki was born and raised in Litchfield, Minnesota and attended Litchfield High School. He played college football at the University of Wisconsin-River Falls, where he was a team captain as a senior.

== Coaching career ==
=== Early career ===
Kotelnicki began his coaching career as a student offensive line coach during his senior year at Wisconsin–River Falls. He was hired as an offensive assistant at Western Illinois in 2004. After two seasons, he returned to UW-River Falls as the Falcons' offensive coordinator. Kotelnicki was hired as the offensive coordinator of Division II University of Mary in 2011 and coached there for two seasons before being hired by Lance Leipold at Wisconsin–Whitewater for the same position. Kotelnicki held that position for two seasons, including the Warhawks' 2014 Division III national championship team, before following Leipold after he was hired as the head coach of the University at Buffalo.

=== Kansas ===
In 2021, Kotelnicki was hired as the offensive coordinator at the University of Kansas, following head coach Lance Leipold. He added more option elements to Kansas' offense to complement the skillset of starting quarterback Jalon Daniels for the 2022 season, in which the team became bowl-eligible for the first time since 2008. During the season, Kotelnicki was nominated for the Broyles Award. After the season, he signed a contract extension through the 2027 season that also raised his yearly salary from $500,000 per year to $1 million per year.

=== Penn State ===
On December 1, 2023, Kotelnicki was hired as the offensive coordinator at Pennsylvania State University (Penn State) under head coach James Franklin. In 2024, the Nittany Lions set a single season school-record with 13 wins and reached the College Football Playoff semi-finals.

=== Kansas (second stint) ===
In 2026, Kotelnicki returned to the University of Kansas as the associate head coach with Lance Leipold.

== Personal life ==
Kotelnicki and his wife have two children.

Kotelnicki's brother, Josh Kotelnicki, is also a football coach and was previously the head coach at the University of Mary.
