= Chick Agnew =

American football player, coach, and administrator (1894–1942)

Biographical details
- Born: August 11, 1894; Jefferson County, Wisconsin, U.S.
- Died: August 19, 1942 (aged 48)

Coaching career (HC unless noted)

Football
- 1920–1941: Whitewater Normal/State

Basketball
- 1920–1942: Whitewater Normal/State

Baseball
- 1920–1925: Whitewater Normal

Administrative career (AD unless noted)
- 1920–1942: Whitewater Normal/State

Head coaching record
- Overall: 96–38-8 (football); 145–155 (basketball); 27–24 (baseball)

Charles Henry "Chick" Agnew Jr. (August 11, 1894 – August 19, 1942) was an American college football player and coach and college athletics administrator. He grew up near Whitewater, Wisconsin, and attended Whitewater State Teachers College. He was a star football and baseball player who received a bachelor's degree in 1917. He was the athletic director and head coach for the Whitewater State Teachers College athletic teams from February 1920 until his death from heart disease in August 1942 at age 48.
