= Josh Kotelnicki =

American football player and coach

Playing career
- 1997–2001: North Dakota
- Position: Outside linebacker

Coaching career (HC unless noted)
- 2002–2003: Murray State (OL)
- 2004–2005: North Dakota (OLB)
- 2006: Truman State (DC)
- 2007: Kansas State (GA)
- 2008–2012: North Dakota (LB/ST)
- 2013: North Dakota (DC)
- 2014–2017: Mary

Head coaching record
- Overall: 8–36

Josh Kotelnicki is an American former football coach. He served as the head football coach at the University of Mary in Bismarck, North Dakota from 2014 to 2017, compiling a record of 8–36. Kotelnicki was fired after three consecutive 1–10 seasons and replaced by Craig Bagnell. A native of Litchfield, Minnesota, Kotelnicki played college football at the University of North Dakota, where he was a starting outside linebacker on the 2001 North Dakota Fighting Sioux football team, which won the NCAA Division II Football Championship.

== Personal life ==
Kotelnicki's brother, Andy Kotelnicki, is also a football coach and was previously the offensive coordinator at Penn State.

== Head coaching record ==
Year	Team	Overall	Conference	Standing	Bowl/playoffs
Mary Marauders (Northern Sun Intercollegiate Conference) (2014–2017)
2014	Mary	5–6	5–6 / 3–4	6th / T–4th (North)	
2015	Mary	1–10	1–10 / 1–6	T–13th / T–6th (North)	
2016	Mary	1–10	1–10 / 1–6	15th / 7th (North)	
2017	Mary	1–10	1–10 / 1–6	15th / 7th (North)	
Mary:		8–36	8–36		
Total:		8–36			
