= Ryan Nourse =

American football coach

Current position
- Title: Head coach
- Team: Montana Western
- Conference: Frontier
- Record: 75–54

Playing career
- 1990–1991: Dickinson State
- 1992–1994: Western Montana
- Position: Wide receiver

Coaching career (HC unless noted)
- 1997–1999: Salmon HS (ID)
- 2000: Western State (assistant)
- 2001–2007: Morningside (assistant)
- 2008–2009: Truman State (assistant)
- 2010: Morningside (assistant)
- 2011–2012: Montana Western
- 2016–present: Montana Western

Administrative career (AD unless noted)
- 2013–2016: Montana Western

Head coaching record
- Overall: 75–54
- Tournaments: 1–3 (NAIA playoffs)

Accomplishments and honors

Championships
- 3 Frontier (2021, 2023–2024)

Awards
- AFCA NAIA Assistant Coach of the Year (2007); 2× Frontier Coach of the Year (2023–2024)

Ryan Nourse is an American college football coach and former athletic administrator. He is the head football coach for the University of Montana Western, a position he held from 2011 to 2012 and resumed in 2016. Nourse served as the athletic director at Montana Western from 2013 to 2016.

== Playing career ==
Nourse started his playing career at Dickinson State University in Dickinson, North Dakota. He played for the Blue Hawks, helping his team make it to the semifinal round of the 1991 NAIA Division II tournament. He then transferred to Western Montana College (now the University of Montana Western), where he was a two-year starter for the Bulldogs. While there, he helped the Bulldogs win two Frontier Conference championships in 1993 and 1994.

== Coaching career ==
Nourse started his coaching career at Salmon High School in Salmon, Idaho. He coached the Savages for three years before receiving his first collegiate coaching job at Western State College of Colorado (now Western Colorado University), where he was put in charge of coaching the defensive backs. Nourse's next stint came as an assistant coach at Morningside University in Sioux City, Iowa from 2001 to 2007. From 2003 to 2007, Nourse was the defensive coordinator and assistant head coach for the Morningside Mustangs, as well as serving as the strength and conditioning coordinator, special teams coach, and recruiting coordinator. Following the 2007 season, Nourse was named as the American Football Coaches Association (AFCA) Assistant Coach of the Year. He then served as the defensive coordinator, linebackers coach, and academic coordinator for Truman State from 2008 to 2009. Then, in 2010, Nourse returned to Morningside where he served as the offensive coordinator, quarterbacks coach, and the recruiting and camp coordinator.

In 2011, Nourse received his first head coaching opportunity at his alma mater, the University of Montana Western. He coached the Bulldogs for two seasons before being named as the school's athletic director. Then, in December 2015, Nourse was again named as the head football coach for Montana Western. In his time as head coach, Nourse has led the Bulldogs to three Frontier Conference championships in 2021, 2023, and 2024, and has accumulated an overall record of 71–48. He has also been named as the Frontier Conference Coach of the Year twice, in 2023 and 2024.

== Head coaching record ==
Year	Team	Overall	Conference	Standing	Bowl/playoffs	NAIA^{#}
Montana Western Bulldogs (Frontier Conference) (2011–2012)
2011	Montana Western	2–9	2–8	6th		
2012	Montana Western	4–6	4–6	5th		
Montana Western Bulldogs (Frontier Conference) (2016–present)
2016	Montana Western	7–4	6–4	3rd		20
2017	Montana Western	4–7	4–6	T–5th		
2018	Montana Western	6–4	6–4	T–2nd		
2019	Montana Western	7–3	7–3	2nd		22
2020–21	No team—COVID-19					
2021	Montana Western	8–4	7–3	T–1st	L NAIA First Round	18
2022	Montana Western	7–4	6–4	T–3rd		
2023	Montana Western	9–2	7–1	1st	L NAIA Second Round	8
2024	Montana Western	10–2	7–1	1st	L NAIA Quarterfinal	5
2025	Montana Western	7–3	4–2	3rd (West)		18
2026	Montana Western	4–6	2–4	T–4th (West)		
Montana Western:		75–54	62–46			
Total:		75–54				
National championship Conference title Conference division title or championship game berth
