= Nate Trewyn =

American football player (born 1996)

No. 60
- Position: Center

Personal information
- Born: May 16, 1996 (age 30); Janesville, Wisconsin, U.S.
- Listed height: 6 ft 3 in (1.91 m)
- Listed weight: 315 lb (143 kg)

Career information
- High school: Milton (WI)
- College: Wisconsin-Whitewater
- NFL draft: 2019: undrafted

Career history
- Tampa Bay Buccaneers (2019); Los Angeles Rams (2019–2020)*
- * Offseason or practice squad member only
- Stats at Pro Football Reference

Nate Trewyn (born May 16, 1996) is an American former professional football center. He attended Minnesota State University, Mankato, where he started all 12 regular season games in 2015. He then transferred to the University of Wisconsin-Whitewater. In 2016, Trewyn was named first-team All-American and won the Rimington Award for the top center in Division III. He participated at the pro day for Wisconsin. Trewyn signed with the Tampa Bay Buccaneers after going undrafted in the 2019 NFL draft.

== Professional career ==
=== Tampa Bay Buccaneers ===
Trewyn signed with the Tampa Bay Buccaneers as an undrafted free agent following the 2019 NFL draft. On August 31, 2019, Trewyn was waived by the Buccaneers and was signed to the practice squad the next day. He was promoted to the active roster on October 12, 2019. He was waived on November 11.

=== Los Angeles Rams ===
On November 13, 2019, Trewyn was signed to the Los Angeles Rams practice squad. He signed a reserve/future contract with the Rams on December 31, 2019. He was waived on July 25, 2020.

=== Foremost Media ===
On December 5, 2022, Trewyn was signed to the Foremost Media support team. In March 2023, he transferred over to the project team where he still resides to this day.
