= 2014 Wartburg Knights football team =

American college football season

2014 Wartburg Knights football

IIAC champion

NCAA Division III Quarterfinal, L 33–37 at Wisconsin–Whitewater
- Conference: Iowa Intercollegiate Athletic Conference

Ranking
- AFCA: No. 4
- D3Football.com: No. 4
- Record: 12–1 (8–0 IIAC)
- Head coach: Rick Willis (16th season)
- Offensive coordinator: Matt Wheeler (5th season)
- Defensive coordinator: Chris Winter (4th season)
- Home stadium: Walston-Hoover Stadium

2014 Iowa Intercollegiate Athletic Conference football standings
	Conf.			Overall
Team	W		L	W		L
No. 4 Wartburg $^	7	–	0	12	–	1
Central (IA)	6	–	1	8	–	2
Buena Vista	4	–	3	5	–	5
Coe	4	–	3	5	–	5
Dubuque	3	–	4	4	–	6
Luther	2	–	5	5	–	5
Loras	2	–	5	3	–	7
Simpson (IA)	0	–	7	3	–	7
$ – Conference champion; ^ – NCAA Division III playoff participant; Rankings from D3football.com

The 2014 Wartburg Knights football team represented Wartburg College as a member of the Iowa Intercollegiate Athletic Conference (IIAC) during the 2014 NCAA Division III football season. Led by Rick Willis in his 16th season as head coach, the Knights compiled an overall record of 12–1 with a mark of 8–0 in conference play, winning IIAC title for the second year in a row and earning an automatic bid to the NCAA Division III Football Championship playoffs. Wartburg lost in the quarterfinal round of the playoffs to eventual national champion Wisconsin–Whitewater. The Knights held a 17-point lead early in the fourth quarter, but lost 37–33. The team played home games at Walston-Hoover Stadium in Waverly, Iowa.

== Schedule ==
Wartburg's 2014 regular season scheduled consisted of five home and five away games.

Date	Time	Opponent	Rank	Site	Result	Attendance	Source
September 6	1:00 p.m.	at Augsburg*	No. 17	Edor Nelon Field; Minneapolis, MN	W 40–3	2,737	
September 13	1:00 p.m.	No. 7 Bethel*	No. 15	Walston-Hoover Stadium; Waverly, IA	W 31–14	3,000	
September 20	1:00 p.m.	Wisconsin–Stout*	No. 9	Walston-Hoover Stadium; Waverly, IA	W 45–14	4,500	
October 4	1:00 p.m.	at Central (IA)	No. 8	Schipper Stadium; Pella, IA	W 35–14	3,500	
October 11	1:00 p.m.	at Coe	No. 7	Clark Field; Cedar Rapids, IA	W 43–0	4,819	
October 18	1:30 p.m.	Dubuque^{†}	No. 6	Walston-Hoover Stadium; Waverly, IA	W 42–9	3,540	
October 25	1:00 p.m.	Luther	No. 6	Walston-Hoover Stadium; Waverly, IA	W 52–7	3,517	
November 1	1:00 p.m.	at Buena Vista	No. 6	J. Leslie Rollins; Storm Lake, IA	W 43–24	3,100	
November 8	1:00 p.m.	at Simpson	No. 5	Buxton Stadium; Indianola, IA	W 41–10	1,524	
November 15	1:00 p.m.	Loras	No. 5	Walston-Hoover Stadium; Waverly, IA	W 81–21	1,017	
November 18	12:00 p.m.	No. 20 St. Thomas (MN)*	No. 5	Walston-Hoover Stadium; Waverly, IA (NCAA Division III First Round)	W 37–31	2,752	
November 25	12:00 p.m.	No. 13 St. Johns (MN)*	No. 5	Walston-Hoover Stadium; Waverly, IA (NCAA Division III Second Round)	W 21–10	4,850	
December 12	12:00 p.m.	at No. 1 Wisconsin–Whitewater*	No. 5	Perkins Stadium; Whitewater, WI (NCAA Division III Quarterfinal)	L 33–37	1,790	
*Non-conference game; ^{†}Homecoming; Rankings from D3Football.com Poll released prior to the game; All times are in Central time

== Awards and honors ==
Individual awards
Player	Award
Logan Schrader	Gagliardi Trophy Semifinalist; IIAC Offensive Player of the year D3football.com Third-team All-American
Spencer Capitani	IIAC Defensive Player of the Year; D3football.com Second-team All-American
Chris Brinkmeier	D3football.com West Region Offensive Player of the Year; D3football.com First-team All-American; AFCA First-team All-American
Coach	Award
Rick Willis	IIAC Coach of the year

All-Conference
Player	Position	Team	Year
Logan Schrader	QB	1	Jr
Taylor Jacobsmeier	WR	1	SR
Chris Brinkmeier	OL	1	SR
Casey Krull	OL	1	SR
Chase Wilhelms	OL	1	JR
Spencer Capitani	DB	1	SR
Logan Pitz	WR	1	JR
Miguel Lozan	DB	1	SR
Cole Hinders	DL	1	JR
Will Janssen	LB	1	JR
Drew Kooi	LB	1	Sr
Grant Zimmerman	P	1	Jr
Donald Miller	RS	1	Sr
Brandon Domeyer	RB	2	Jr
Robbie Anstoetter	WR	2	Jr
Bjorn Nelson	OL	2	Sr
Skylar Dierikx	DB	2	Sr
Zach Twedt	DL	2	Sr
Gunner Tranel	LB	2	Jr
Donald Miller	WR	HM	Sr
HM = Honorable mention. Reference:
