= Alan Hensell =

American football coach (born c. 1983)

Current position
- Title: Offensive analyst
- Team: Eastern Michigan
- Conference: MAC

Biographical details
- Born: c. 1983 (age 42–43); New Carlisle, Indiana, U.S.
- Education: Franklin College (2005)

Playing career

Football
- 2002: Franklin (IN)

Baseball
- 2002: Franklin (IN)
- Positions: Running back, wide receiver (football); Pitcher (baseball)

Coaching career (HC unless noted)

Football
- 2003: Decatur Central HS (IN) (QB)
- 2004: Franklin (IN) (OLB)
- 2005–2006: Wisconsin–River Falls (QB)
- 2007–2009: Ole Miss (GA)
- 2010: Tennessee (assistant OL)
- 2011: Ole Miss (GA)
- 2012 (spring): UConn (assistant OL)
- 2012: Gardner–Webb (OL)
- 2013–2014: Wisconsin–Whitewater (WR)
- 2015–2019: Buffalo (TE)
- 2020–2024: Franklin (IN)
- 2025–present: Eastern Michigan (off. analyst)

Head coaching record
- Overall: 21–26

Alan C. Hensell (born c. 1983) is an American college football coach. He is an offensive analyst for Eastern Michigan University, a position he has held since 2025. He was the head football coach for Franklin College from 2020 to 2024. He also coached for Decatur Central High School, Wisconsin–River Falls, Ole Miss, Tennessee, UConn, Gardner–Webb, Wisconsin–Whitewater, and Buffalo. He played college football for Franklin (IN) as a running back and wide receiver and also played college baseball for Franklin (IN) as a pitcher.

== Head coaching record ==
Year	Team	Overall	Conference	Standing	Bowl/playoffs
Franklin Grizzlies (Heartland Collegiate Athletic Conference) (2020–2024)
2020–21	Franklin	4–3	4–3	4th	
2021	Franklin	6–4	4–3	T–3rd	
2022	Franklin	4–6	4–3	4th	
2023	Franklin	4–6	4–3	T–3rd	
2024	Franklin	3–7	2–4	5th	
Franklin:		21–26	18–16		
Total:		21–26			
