= Lance Leipold =

American football coach (born 1964)

Current position
- Title: Head coach
- Team: Kansas
- Conference: Big 12
- Record: 31–42
- Annual salary: $6,650,000

Biographical details
- Born: May 6, 1964 (age 62); Jefferson, Wisconsin, U.S.
- Education: University of Wisconsin–Whitewater

Playing career
- 1983–1986: Wisconsin–Whitewater
- Position: Quarterback

Coaching career (HC unless noted)
- 1987: Wisconsin–Whitewater (QB)
- 1988: Wisconsin-Whitewater (WR)
- 1989: Doane (QB/WR)
- 1990: Wisconsin-Whitewater (assistant)
- 1991–1993: Wisconsin (GA)
- 1994–1999: Nebraska–Omaha (RB)
- 2000: Nebraska–Omaha (OC/RB)
- 2001–2003: Nebraska (assistant)
- 2004–2006: Nebraska–Omaha (AHC/OC)
- 2007–2014: Wisconsin-Whitewater
- 2015–2020: Buffalo
- 2021–present: Kansas

Head coaching record
- Overall: 177–81
- Tournaments: 34–1 (NCAA D-III playoffs)

Accomplishments and honors

Championships
- 6 NCAA Division III (2007, 2009–2011, 2013–2014); 7 WIAC (2007–2011, 2013–2014); 2 MAC East Division (2018, 2020)

Awards
- 6× AFCA Division III COY (2007, 2009–2011, 2013–2014); 4× WIAC Coach of the Year (2009–2011, 2014); 2× MAC Coach of the Year (2018, 2020); Wisconsin Football Coaches Association (WFCA) Hall of Fame (inducted in 2018)

Lance O. Leipold (/ˈlaɪpoʊld/ LY-pohld; born May 6, 1964) is an American college football coach who is the head football coach at the University of Kansas, a position he has held since 2021. He was the head football coach at the University of Wisconsin–Whitewater from 2007 to 2014 and the University at Buffalo from 2015 to 2020. During his tenure at Wisconsin–Whitewater, Leipold led the Warhawks to NCAA Division III Football Championships in 2007, 2009, 2010, 2011, 2013, and 2014. In five of those seasons, his teams finished undefeated.

Leipold reached 100 victories faster than any coach in NCAA history, doing so in his 106th game on October 18, 2014. This broke the previous mark of 108 games set by Gil Dobie in 1921.

Leipold signed with Buffalo for the 2015 season, initially on a five-year contract. After a 5–7 record in his inaugural season, Leipold received an additional one-year extension that kept him with the Bulls through 2020. Leipold signed a contract extension in February 2020 that was to run through the 2024 season. In May 2021, Leipold accepted the head coach position at the University of Kansas.

== Playing career ==
Leipold was born in Jefferson, Wisconsin, and attended Jefferson High School. He played quarterback, earning all-area honors and honorable mention all-state his senior year after completing 114 of 198 passes for 1,848 yards and 19 touchdowns. Due to the teams prolific passing game, they earned the nickname "Air Jefferson." Leipold played in the North-South All-State Shrine Bowl throwing for two touchdowns in the South's 23–7 victory. He was also all-conference in basketball.

Leipold attended the University of Wisconsin–Whitewater from 1983 to 1986, seeing playing time as a starter and backup his first two seasons and becoming the outright starter for his junior and senior seasons. He helped win the Wisconsin State University Athletic Conference championship in 1984. In a 35–28 loss to Wisconsin–River Falls, Leipold set school records for single game passing yards, attempts, completions, and total offense with his 37 completions on 57 passes for 474 yards and four touchdowns, all records still stand. He was nominated all conference honorable mention his junior season and 2nd team for his senior campaign. Leipold was inducted into the college's hall of fame in 2003.

== Coaching career ==
=== As an assistant ===
Following his graduation from Wisconsin–Whitewater in 1987, Leipold spent the next seven years as an assistant coach, starting at his alma mater from 1987 to 1988, and then again in 1990. He spent one year (1989) at Doane University, an NAIA school in Crete, Nebraska, and three (1991–1993) as a graduate assistant at the University of Wisconsin. During his first stint at Wisconsin–Whitewater he overlapped with Roger Hughes, future head coach at Stetson University, president of Doane University, and a life-long friend.

In 1994, new University of Nebraska–Omaha (UNO) head coach Pat Behrns hired Leipold as one of his assistants. It was Leipold's first full-time, paid coaching position. During Leipold's seven years at UNO (1994–2000) he developed a strong reputation as a recruiter.

=== Wisconsin–Whitewater ===
Leipold was announced as the head coach at Wisconsin–Whitewater after the 2006 season over three other finalists for the position: Stan Zweifel, Curt Wiese, and Rick Willis. In his first season, Leipold's team went 14–1, winning the NCAA Division III Football Championship with a victory in the title game over Mount Union, 31-21. The only loss of the season was to DII St. Cloud State. The next season, his team reached the National Championship game but fell to Mount Union 31–26, finishing 13–2. From 2009 to 2011, he led each team to a 15–0 record, beating Mount Union in the National Championship each time. The 2012 season was Leipold's worst at Whitewater. His team earned a record of 7–3 with two conference losses and missing the playoffs. Leipold's final two seasons again saw the Warhawks go undefeated, beating Mount Union to secure the national championship.

Leipold left Wisconsin–Whitewater with an overall record of 109–6 and a conference mark of 53–3. He earned six Division III National Championships and seven WIAC championships in eight seasons. Other than the 2012 season, his teams were never ranked below No. 15 in any D3football.com poll. The 2010, 2011, and 2014 teams were ranked No. 1 throughout the season.

=== Buffalo ===
On December 1, 2014, it was announced that Leipold had agreed to become the head football coach at the University at Buffalo. The announcement was made while Leipold was preparing for Whitewater's quarterfinal playoff game against Wartburg. In Leipold's first three seasons at Buffalo, the Bulls had records of 5–7, 2–10, and 6–6. The 2018 team won ten games en route to a MAC East Division title and a bid to the Dollar General Bowl. The next season, the Bulls finished 8–5 with a win in the Bahamas Bowl over Charlotte. Leipolds final season with Buffalo was the shortened 2020 season. The Bulls finished 6–1 with a 17–10 win over Marshall in the Camellia Bowl and ranked No. 25.

Leipold left Buffalo with a record of 37–33, two MAC East Division titles, three bowl bids and two bowl wins.

=== Kansas ===
==== 2021 season ====
On April 30, 2021, Leipold was hired at Kansas. In his first game as head coach, the Jayhawks defeated South Dakota, 17–14, for the program's first win in over 22 months. Later that season, Kansas defeated Texas for only the second time in the Big 12's existence, and the first time on the road. The victory ended multiple losing streaks for the Jayhawks, including 8 straight overall losses, 18 straight within the Big 12, 20 straight to FBS opponents, and 56 straight in road conference games. Leipold finished 2–10 overall and 1–8 in conference play in his first season as the Jayhawks head coach.

==== 2022 season ====
The Jayhawks won their first two games to start the 2022 season 2–0 for the first time since 2011. With a win over West Virginia on September 10, the Jayhawks had their first conference opening victory since they defeated Iowa State in 2009. The following week after defeating Houston, the Jayhawks began the season with a 3–0 record, which is their best start since the 2009 season. In the poll released on September 18, the Jayhawks received votes to be ranked for the first time since the 2009 season. Two weeks later after a 5–0 start, the Jayhawks entered the poll at 19, their first time being ranked since 2009. The Jayhawks would lose 3 straight games and fall out the polls afterwards. They ended their losing streak with a bowl eligibility clinching 6th win over Oklahoma State. The win over Oklahoma State was the Jayhawks first win over an AP poll ranked team since 2010 and their first ever win over a team ranked in the College Football Playoff poll since its inception in 2014.

==== 2023 season ====
In 2023, Kansas began the season 4–0, their second consecutive season starting 4–0. It was the first time they started 4–0 back-to-back seasons since they did it 3 consecutive seasons from 1913 to 1915. Four weeks later, the Jayhawks defeated Oklahoma. The win over Oklahoma accomplished several feats: the first home win for Kansas over a top 10 ranked team since 1984, the first win over Oklahoma since 1997, and first win over a top 10 opponent since the 2008 Orange Bowl. The victory also made Kansas bowl eligible for the 2nd consecutive season for only the 2nd time in program history. The Jayhawks lost 31-27 to rival Kansas State in what was the first time in nearly 30 years that both teams were ranked in the Sunflower Showdown. Kansas fell to 7-4 and out of the rankings. The Jayhawks defeated UNLV in the 2023 Guaranteed Rate Bowl to put their final record at 9-4. The Jayhawks won their first bowl game since 2008 and finished ranked in the AP and Coaches Polls for the first time since 2007. The Jayhawks also won 5 conference games, their most conference wins since 2007.

== Head coaching record ==
Year	Team	Overall	Conference	Standing	Bowl/playoffs	D3/Coaches^{#}	AP^{°}
Wisconsin–Whitewater Warhawks (Wisconsin Intercollegiate Athletic Conference) (2007–2014)
2007	Wisconsin–Whitewater	14–1	7–0	1st	W NCAA Division III Championship	1	
2008	Wisconsin–Whitewater	13–2	6–1	T–1st	L NCAA Division III Championship	2	
2009	Wisconsin–Whitewater	15–0	7–0	1st	W NCAA Division III Championship	1	
2010	Wisconsin–Whitewater	15–0	7–0	1st	W NCAA Division III Championship	1	
2011	Wisconsin–Whitewater	15–0	7–0	1st	W NCAA Division III Championship	1	
2012	Wisconsin–Whitewater	7–3	5–2	T–2nd			
2013	Wisconsin–Whitewater	15–0	7–0	1st	W NCAA Division III Championship	1	
2014	Wisconsin–Whitewater	15–0	7–0	1st	W NCAA Division III Championship	1	
Wisconsin–Whitewater:		109–6	53–3				
Buffalo Bulls (Mid-American Conference) (2015–2020)
2015	Buffalo	5–7	3–5	4th (East)			
2016	Buffalo	2–10	1–7	6th (East)			
2017	Buffalo	6–6	4–4	T–3rd (East)			
2018	Buffalo	10–4	7–1	1st (East)	L Dollar General		
2019	Buffalo	8–5	5–3	T–2nd (East)	W Bahamas		
2020	Buffalo	6–1	5–0	1st (East)	W Camellia	25	25
Buffalo:		37–33	25–20				
Kansas Jayhawks (Big 12 Conference) (2021–present)
2021	Kansas	2–10	1–8	10th			
2022	Kansas	6–7	3–6	T–7th	L Liberty		
2023	Kansas	9–4	5–4	T–7th	W Guaranteed Rate	23	23
2024	Kansas	5–7	4–5	10th			
2025	Kansas	5–7	3–6	T–11th			
2026	Kansas	4–7	2–6				
Kansas:		31–42	18–35				
Total:		177–81					
National championship Conference title Conference division title or championship game berth
