= Jace Rindahl =

American football coach (born c. 1987)

Current position
- Title: Head coach
- Team: Wisconsin–Whitewater
- Conference: WIAC
- Record: 25–9

Biographical details
- Born: c. 1987 (age 38–39); Cambridge, Wisconsin, U.S.
- Education: University of Wisconsin–Whitewater (2010, 2012)

Playing career
- 2005–2008: Wisconsin–Whitewater
- Position: Linebacker

Coaching career (HC unless noted)
- 2009–2012: Wisconsin–Whitewater (RB/ST)
- 2013–2014: South Dakota (RB)
- 2015–2019: Wisconsin–Whitewater (LB)
- 2020: Wisconsin–Whitewater (interim DC)
- 2021: Wisconsin–Whitewater (DC)
- 2022: Wisconsin–Whitewater (DC/AHC)
- 2023–present: Wisconsin–Whitewater

Head coaching record
- Overall: 25–9
- Tournaments: 2–2 (NCAA D-III playoffs)

Accomplishments and honors

Awards
- As player: First Team All-American (2008); D3football.com Defensive Player of the Year (2008); Stagg Bowl champion (2007); As coach: WIAC Assistant Coach of the Year (2018)

Jace Rindahl (born c. 1987) is an American college football coach. He is the head football coach for the University of Wisconsin-Whitewater, a position he has held since 2023. He played college football for Wisconsin–Whitewater as a linebacker. He previously coached for South Dakota alongside numerous roles with Wisconsin–Whitewater prior to becoming the head coach.

During his playing career with the Warhawks he earned First Team All-American honors and was named the D3football.com Defensive Player of the Year in 2008. He also helped lead the team to a Division III Stagg Bowl victory in 2007.

== Head coaching record ==
Year	Team	Overall	Conference	Standing	Bowl/playoffs	AFCA^{#}	D3^{°}
Wisconsin–Whitewater Warhawks (Wisconsin Intercollegiate Athletic Conference) (2023–present)
2023	Wisconsin–Whitewater	11–2	6–1	2nd	L NCAA Division III Quarterfinal	5	5
2024	Wisconsin–Whitewater	6–4	4–3	T–3rd			
2025	Wisconsin–Whitewater	8–3	5–2	T–2nd	L NCAA Division III Second Round	20	18
2026	Wisconsin–Whitewater	0–0	0–0				
Wisconsin–Whitewater:		25–9	15–6				
Total:		25–9					
