= Kevin Bullis =

American football coach

Biographical details
- Education: University of Minnesota Morris

Coaching career (HC unless noted)
- 1988–1989: Minnesota–Morris (LB)
- 1990–1992: Wisconsin–River Falls (LB)
- 1993–1994: Gustavus Adolphus (DC)
- 1995–2007: Wisconsin–River Falls (DC)
- 2008–2014: Wisconsin–Whitewater (assistant)
- 2015–2022: Wisconsin–Whitewater

Head coaching record
- Overall: 78–13
- Tournaments: 15–6 (NCAA D-III playoffs)

Accomplishments and honors

Championships
- 5 WIAC (2016, 2018–2019, 2021–2022)

Kevin Bullis is an American former college football coach. He served as the head football coach at the University of Wisconsin–Whitewater from 2015 to 2022, compiling a record of 78–13. He was initially named interim head coach when his predecessor, Lance Leipold, left the school to take the head coaching job at the University at Buffalo. Bullis was named to the position on a permanent basis on January 30, 2015. He retired in November 2022.

== Head coaching record ==
Year	Team	Overall	Conference	Standing	Bowl/playoffs	D3^{#}
Wisconsin–Whitewater Warhawks (Wisconsin Intercollegiate Athletic Conference) (2015–2022)
2015	Wisconsin–Whitewater	12–2	6–1	2nd	L NCAA Division III Semifinal	4
2016	Wisconsin–Whitewater	12–1	7–0	1st	L NCAA Division III Quarterfinal	5
2017	Wisconsin–Whitewater	7–3	6–1	2nd		23
2018	Wisconsin–Whitewater	13–1	7–0	1st	L NCAA Division III Semifinal	4
2019	Wisconsin–Whitewater	13–2	6–1	T–1st	L NCAA Division III Championship	2
2020–21	No team—COVID-19					
2021	Wisconsin–Whitewater	13–1	7–0	1st	L NCAA Division III Semifinal	3
2022	Wisconsin–Whitewater	8–3	6–1	T–1st	L NCAA Division III First Round	16
Wisconsin–Whitewater:		78–13	45–4			
Total:		78–13				
National championship Conference title Conference division title or championship game berth
