= Brian Borland =

American football player and coach

Biographical details
- Born: 1962 or 1963 (age 63–64)
- Education: Morningside College (1985)

Playing career
- 1981–1984: Morningside
- Position: Defensive back

Coaching career (HC unless noted)

Football
- 1985: Wisconsin (GA)
- 1986–1987: Arizona Western (DB)
- 1988: Florida (GA)
- 1989–1990: Minnesota–Morris (DC)
- 1991–1993: Baker (DC)
- 1994–2014: Wisconsin–Whitewater (AHC/DC)
- 2015–2020: Buffalo (DC/S)
- 2021–2024: Kansas (DC)

Softball
- 1991–1993: Baker

Track & field
- 1989–1990: Minnesota–Morris
- 1994–2002: Wisconsin–Whitewater

Brian J. Borland is an American former football coach.

== Coaching career ==
In 1985, Borland got his first coaching job with Wisconsin as a graduate assistant. Then in 1986, Borland would get an assistant coaching job with Arizona Western, before in 1988, Borland would take another graduate assistant job this time with the Florida Gators. Then one year later in 1989, Borland got his first defensive coordinator job with Minnesota-Morris. In 1991, Borland was hired by Baker as the team's defensive coordinator. In his times at Baker he additionally served as the school's head softball coach. Also when he left to join Wisconsin-Whitewater, Borland served as the Track & Field coach from 1994 to 2002. In 1994, Borland joined Wisconsin-Whitewater as the team's defensive back coach. In 2002, Borland was promoted to be the team's defensive coordinator. During his time at Wisconsin-Whitewater, Borland was named the Wisconsin Collegiate Assistant Coach of the Year twice in 2004 and 2006 and was named the NCAA Division III Coordinator of the Year in 2013. In 2015, Borland was hired by the Buffalo Bulls to serve as the team's defensive coordinator. In 2021, Borland joined the Kansas Jayhawks as the team's defensive coordinator. On December 8, 2024, Borland announced that he would be retiring from coaching.
