= Perkins Stadium =

Stadium in Whitewater, Wisconsin

Coordinates: 42.847065°N 88.744849°W

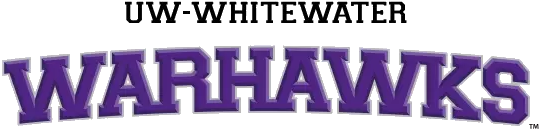

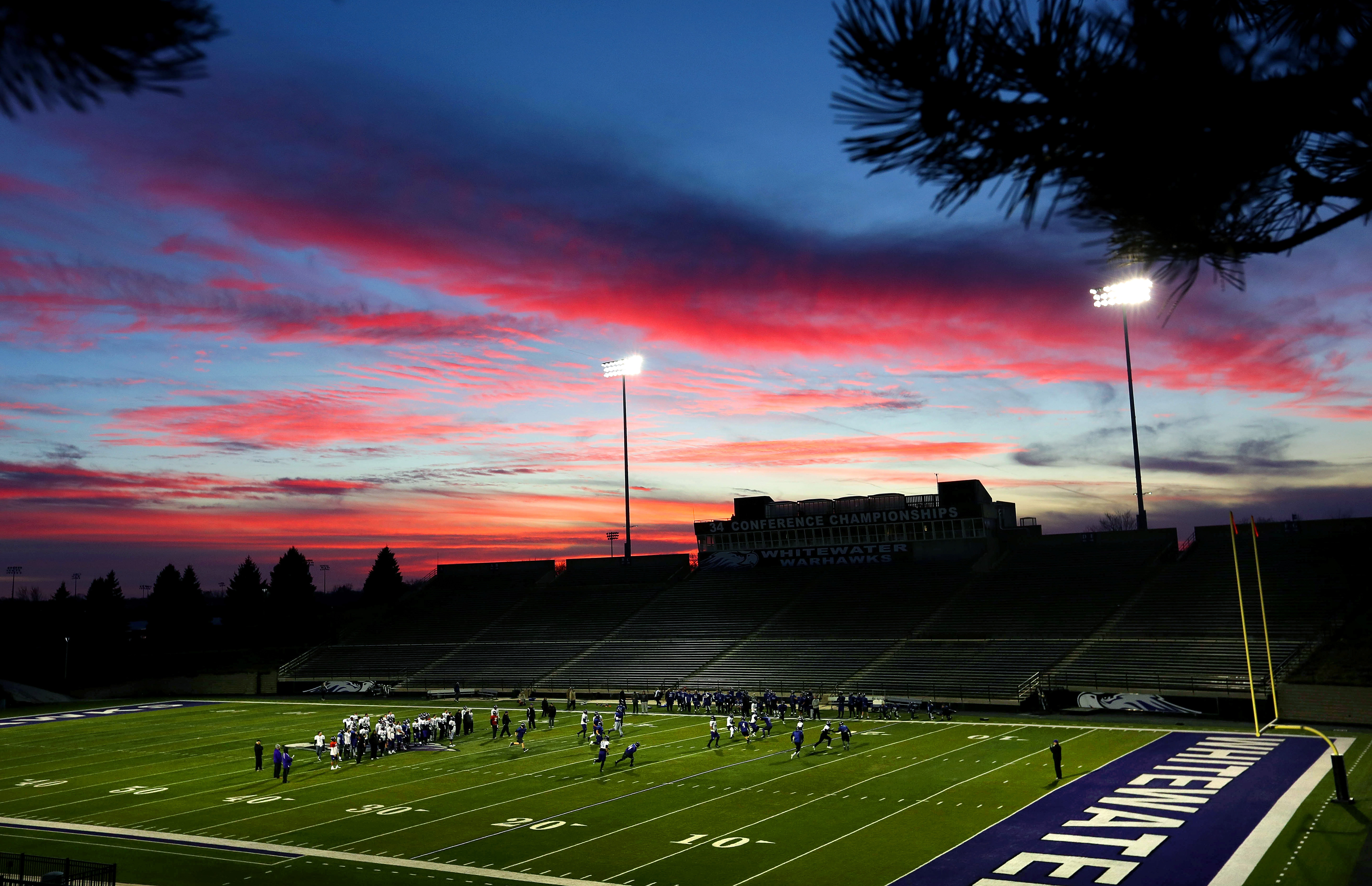
- The stadium during a football game
- Interactive map of Perkins Stadium
- Full name: Forrest Perkins Stadium
- Former names: Warhawks Stadium (1970–96)
- Address: 910 W. Schwager Dr. Whitewater, WI; U.S.
- Owner: University of Wisconsin–Whitewater
- Operator: UWW Athletics
- Type: Stadium
- Current use: Football

Construction
- Opened: 1970; 56 years ago

Tenant
- UWW Warhawks football

Website
- uwwsports.com/perkins-stadium

Perkins Stadium is an outdoor sports stadium in Whitewater, Wisconsin. Primarily used for American football, it serves as the home field of the University of Wisconsin–Whitewater Warhawks. Opened in 1970 as "Warhawks Stadium", with a capacity of 11,000 people. It was renamed in 1996 in honor of former football coach Forrest Perkins.

The stadium hosts several marching band events, including the MACBDA Championships and the WSMA State Marching Band Championships. Drum Corps International and Drum & Bugle Corps World Championships held at the stadium in 1972 and 1973.

I 2008 the stadium underwent a significant renovation that added synthetic turf, upgraded bench areas, landscaping and other improvements, including upgrades to the entrance area and scoreboard. The project increased seating capacity to 13,500, making Perkins Stadium the largest facility in NCAA Division III.

On October 3, 2015, a record crowd of 15,287 was recorded for a game. That mark was shattered on October 8, 2016, when the Warhawks defeated the University of Wisconsin-Oshkosh 17–14 in front of a crowd of 17,535 fans, then broken again on October 13, 2022, for a Friday night game between the same teams with 18,951 in attendance. The record was broken again at the October 7, 2023 game against the University of Wisconsin-La Crosse, where 20,113 people were in attendance. That not only broke the previous Perkins Stadium record, but also broke the NCAA Division III record for attendance. On September 23, 2017, the NCAA record was broken by a St. Thomas vs. Saint John's contest that was hosted at Target Field in Minneapolis, Minnesota. However, the October 2023 game maintains the largest crowd for a Division III game played at a non-neutral site.

Preceded by first stadium	Host of the Drum Corps International; World Championship; 1972 – 1973	Succeeded by Schoellkopf Field
