= Wisconsin–Whitewater Warhawks football =

D3 College Football Team

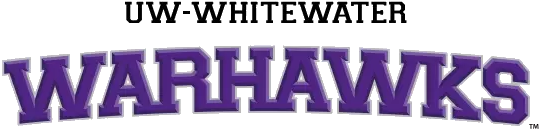
- First season: 1889; 137 years ago
- Athletic director: Ryan Callahan
- Head coach: Jace Rindahl; 3rd season, 25–9 (.735)
- Location: Whitewater, Wisconsin
- Stadium: Perkins Stadium (capacity: 13,500)
- NCAA division: Division III
- Conference: WIAC
- Colors: Purple and white
- All-time record: 661–273–21 (.703)
- Playoff record: 61–15 (.803)

NCAA Division III championships
- 2007, 2009, 2010, 2011, 2013, 2014

Conference championships
- WIAC: 1913, 1914, 1922, 1932, 1937, 1940, 1941, 1950, 1959, 1960, 1962, 1966, 1967, 1969, 1974, 1975, 1978, 1980, 1984, 1987, 1988, 1990, 1994, 1997, 1998, 2005, 2006, 2007, 2008, 2009, 2010, 2011, 2013, 2014, 2016, 2018, 2019, 2021, 2022, 2026
- Consensus All-Americans: 125
- Rivalries: Wisconsin–La Crosse Eagles; Wisconsin–Oshkosh Titans; Mount Union Purple Raiders
- Mascot: Willie Warhawk
- Website: uwwsports.com/football

The Wisconsin–Whitewater Warhawks football program is the intercollegiate American football team for the University of Wisconsin–Whitewater located in the U.S. state of Wisconsin. The team competes in NCAA Division III and is a member of the Wisconsin Intercollegiate Athletic Conference (WIAC). Wisconsin-Whitewater's first football team was fielded in 1889. The team plays its home games at the 13,500-seat Perkins Stadium in Whitewater, Wisconsin. Jace Rindahl has served as the head coach for the Warhawks since 2023, taking over for eight-year head coach Kevin Bullis.

== History ==
The Warhawks compete in the WIAC conference of NCAA Division III football. In the 2005 and 2006 seasons, they finished the year undefeated in regular season play, losing only in the Amos Alonzo Stagg Bowls of 2005 and 2006 to the University of Mount Union (then Mount Union College), under former coach and UW–Whitewater alum Bob Berezowitz (UW–Whitewater 1967), who had quarterbacked the UW–Whitewater team as the runner-up in the 1966 NAIA playoffs.

=== Lance Leipold era (2007–2014) ===
Following the 2006 season, Berezowitz retired, and alum and former assistant Lance Leipold (Wisconsin–Whitewater 1987) was named Warhawk head coach. The Warhawks opened the 2007 season with a victory, then suffered their first regular-season defeat since 2004, 26–16 to NCAA Division II's St. Cloud State. The Warhawks followed this up by going undefeated through the remainder of the season. After finishing the regular season with a 9–1 record and a third consecutive 7–0 WIAC record, the UW–Whitewater Warhawks entered the NCAA Division III playoffs for the third consecutive time. The Warhawks won four home playoff games, including a December 8, 2007 repeat home victory over Mary Hardin–Baylor 16–7 in the semi-finals, to earn their third straight trip to the NCAA Division III Championship Game, the Amos Alonzo Stagg Bowl in Salem, Virginia, and set up their third championship game against Mount Union College. On December 15, 2007, the Warhawks beat Mount Union 31–21 to win the Division III title and close the 2007 season 14–1. Warhawk running back Justin Beaver won the Gagliardi Trophy for his performance both on and off the field.

The Warhawks entered the 2008 playoffs with one loss after a last-second loss to Wisconsin–Stevens Point that ended Wisconsin–Whitewater's WIAC win streak at 27 games. Despite having to travel for some of their playoff contests, the Warhawks won four playoff games, earning a spot in the Stagg Bowl after a 39–13 victory over Mary Hardin–Baylor. On December 20, 2008, the Warhawks lost to Mount Union 31–26 in their fourth consecutive Stagg Bowl matchup.

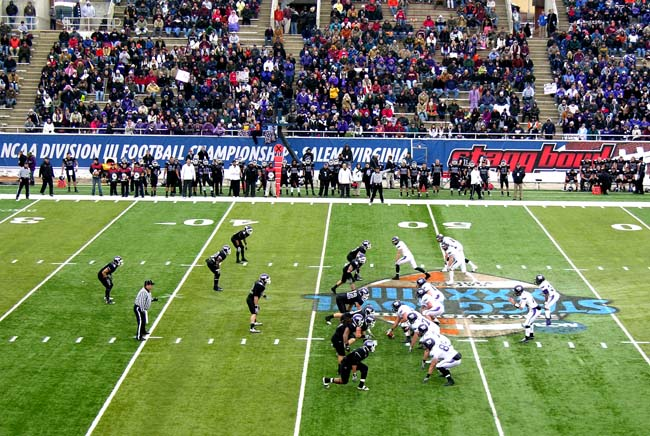
The Warhawks on offense in the 2010 Stagg Bowl

The Warhawks ran the table in 2009 with a perfect record of 15–0, defeating Mount Union in the Stagg Bowl 38–28 to claim their second national title in three years. The string continued in 2010, including a sixth straight WIAC title and ending with UW–Whitewater’s third NCAA Division III championship in four years, with a 31–21 win over Mount Union in the Stagg Bowl to finish 15–0 and run the NCAA's (all divisions) leading win streak to 30 games. Once again, in 2011, they ran the regular season undefeated, winning their seventh straight WIAC title. They then went on to face Mount Union in the Stagg Bowl for the seventh straight season and won their third straight title, their fourth in five years, to finish 15–0 again. They raised their win streak to 45 games, which was just 2 behind Oklahoma's historic Division I streak and is fourth behind Mount Union's separate 55 and 54-game winning streaks in all of college football.

In 2013, the Warhawks faced off with the Purple Raiders of Mount Union in the Stagg Bowl for the eighth time in nine seasons. Wisconsin–Whitewater, led by junior quarterback Matt Behrendt, would go on to win by a final score of 52–14 and secure their fifth national championship and fourth undefeated season under coach Leipold.

On December 19, 2014, the Warhawks and Mount Union met again in the Stagg Bowl; the Warhawks won their sixth national championship over Mount Union for the ninth time in ten seasons, 43–34. This was Leipold's final game as Warhawks head coach, as he had already been announced as the new head coach at Division I FBS school Buffalo.

=== Kevin Bullis era (2015–2022) ===
Kevin Bullis was introduced on February 4, 2015, as the 21st head coach of the Warhawks. The former Wisconsin–Whitewater assistant had spent eight years as the defensive line coach and run defense coordinator. The Warhawks finished the 2015 season as runner-up in the WIAC behind Wisconsin–Oshkosh, to whom they lost 10–7 on October 10. The Warhawks got revenge against the Titans, beating them 31–29 in the third round of the NCAA D-III Playoffs. The Warhawks would go on to lose the next week, 36–6, to the Mount Union Purple Raiders in the NCAA D-III Semifinals. The Warhawks finished the season 12–2.

In 2016, the Warhawks won their 35th conference title on the way to a perfect regular season. The season highlight was a come-from-behind 17–14 victory over Wisconsin–Oshkosh. The game set the D-III on-campus attendance record with 17,535 people in attendance. The record was broken on October 14, 2022. The Warhawks perfect season ended in round 3 of the NCAA D-III playoffs, losing to John Carroll, the same team that three weeks earlier ended Mount Union's 117 regular season win streak, by a score of 31–14.

In 2017, the team started the season 0–2 for the first time since 2001. After a WIAC season-opening loss to Wisconsin–Oshkosh, their record fell to 1–3. The Warhawks then rattled off six straight victories, giving them a final record of 7–3. The substandard season left the Warhawks out of the playoffs for only the second time since 2005.

In 2019, the Warhawks went 9–1 in the regular season, winning the WIAC. In the playoffs, they beat Monmouth (IL) 35–10, then Wartburg 41–28 at home in the first two rounds of the Division III football playoff. For the quarterfinals, UW–Whitewater had to travel to Belton, Texas, to play Mary Hardin–Baylor. The Warhawks beat the Crusaders 26–7. For the semifinal game, Wisconsin–Whitewater played another home game against St. Thomas (MN), winning 35–32 on a go-ahead field goal with 2:10 left in the game. This win clinched the Warhawks' 10th appearance in the Stagg Bowl, second most all-time in Division III history. The team would go on to lose to North Central in the 2019 Stagg Bowl.

Two years later, in 2021, the team made it to the conference semifinals but lost to Mary Hardin–Baylor, who went on to win the Stagg Bowl. It was their only loss of the season, as they went 10–0 in the regular season and also won three playoff games.

The 2022 season came to an end after a 33–28 loss against Aurora in the first round of the playoffs. The Warhawks went 8–3 in the regular season. After the end of the season, head coach Kevin Bullis announced his retirement. Bullis had been involved with Whitewater football for 15 years and was head coach for the last 8. Early in 2023, defensive coordinator Jace Rindahl was named head coach.

=== Jace Rindahl era (2023–present) ===
In the 2023 season, the Warhawks went 9–1 in their first year under Rindahl, their only loss being to UW–La Crosse due to a last-second field goal (37–34). On October 7, the D-III on-campus attendance record was broken with 20,113 people attending the game against UW–La Crosse. They made it to the quarterfinals in the playoffs with 42–14 and 49–42 wins over Bethel (MN) and Wheaton (IL) respectively, before falling to Wartburg 31–28.

== Championships ==
=== National championships ===
The Warhawks have won six national championships in 20 playoff appearances, including 19 in Division III and one in NAIA. All six championships came in an eight-year span and were won by defeating Mount Union under head coach Lance Leipold.

Season	Coach	Record	Location	vs.	Score
2007	Lance Leipold	14–1 (7–0)	Salem, Virginia	Mount Union	31–21
2009	Lance Leipold	15–0 (5–0)	Salem, Virginia	Mount Union	38–28
2010	Lance Leipold	15–0 (7–0)	Salem, Virginia	Mount Union	31–21
2011	Lance Leipold	15–0 (7–0)	Salem, Virginia	Mount Union	13–10
2013	Lance Leipold	15–0 (7–0)	Salem, Virginia	Mount Union	52–14
2014	Lance Leipold	15–0 (7–0)	Salem, Virginia	Mount Union	43–34

=== Conference championships ===
Wisconsin–Whitewater has won the Wisconsin Intercollegiate Athletic Conference (WIAC) championship 40 times.

Year	Coach	Overall	WIAC
1913†	W.E. Schreiber	5–1–2	2–0–2
1914	W.E. Schreiber	6–0	4–0
1922†	Chick Agnew	5–0–2	2–0–1
1932	Chick Agnew	6–1	4–0
1937†	Chick Agnew	6–0–1	4–0
1940†	Chick Agnew	5–2	4–1
1941†	Chick Agnew	3–2–1	3–1–1
1950†	Ed Schwager	6–0	6–0
1959	Forrest Perkins	7–1–1	6–0
1960	Forrest Perkins	7–0–1	6–0
1962	Forrest Perkins	6–3	6–1
1966	Forrest Perkins	10–1	8–0
1967	Forrest Perkins	8–1	7–1
1969†	Forrest Perkins	8–1	7–1
1974†	Forrest Perkins	8–3	7–1
1975†	Forrest Perkins	8–3	7–1
1978†	Forrest Perkins	7–4	7–1
1980†	Forrest Perkins	8–3	6–2
1984†	Forrest Perkins	8–3	7–1
1987†	Bob Berezowitz	7–3–1	5–3
1988	Bob Berezowitz	9–3	7–1
1990	Bob Berezowitz	10–1	8–0
1994	Bob Berezowitz	8–2	6–1
1997	Bob Berezowitz	9–1	7–0
1998†	Bob Berezowitz	7–2	5–2
2005	Bob Berezowitz	14–1	7–0
2006	Bob Berezowitz	14–1	7–0
2007	Lance Leipold	14–1	7–0
2008†	Lance Leipold	13–2	6–1
2009	Lance Leipold	15–0	7–0
2010	Lance Leipold	15–0	7–0
2011	Lance Leipold	15–0	7–0
2013	Lance Leipold	15–0	7–0
2014	Lance Leipold	15–0	7–0
2016	Kevin Bullis	12–1	7–0
2018	Kevin Bullis	13–1	7–0
2019†	Kevin Bullis	13–2	6–1
2021	Kevin Bullis	13–1	7–0
2022†	Kevin Bullis	8–3	6–1
2026	Jace Rindahl		7-0

† Co-champions

== Postseason ==
=== NCAA Division III playoffs ===
The Warhawks have made twenty appearances in the NCAA Division III playoffs, going to 10 Stagg Bowls, and winning 6 national championships, while compiling a 60–14 record.

Year	Round	Opponent	Result	Record
1988	First Round	Simpson	W 29–27	9–3
1988	Quarterfinals	Central (IA)	L 13–16	9–3
1990	First Round	St. Thomas (MN)	L 23–24	10–1
1997	Regionals	Simpson (IA)	L 31–34	9–1
2005	First Round	Central (IA)	W 34–14	14–1
2005	Second Round	Saint John's (MN)	W 34–7	14–1
2005	Quarterfinals	Linfield	W 44–41	14–1
2005	Semifinals	Wesley	W 58–6	14–1
2005	Championship	Mount Union	L 28–35	14–1
2006	First Round	St. Norbert	W 59–17	14–1
2006	Second Round	Wisconsin–La Crosse	W 24–21	14–1
2006	Quarterfinals	Saint John's (MN)	W 17–14	14–1
2006	Semifinals	Wesley	W 44–7	14–1
2006	Championship	Mount Union	L 16–35	14–1
2007	First Round	Capital	W 34–14	14–1
2007	Second Round	North Central (IL)	W 59–28	14–1
2007	Quarterfinals	Wabash	W 47–7	14–1
2007	Semifinals	Mary Hardin–Baylor	W 16–7	14–1
2007	Championship	Mount Union	W 31–21	14–1
2008	First Round	Saint John's (MN)	W 37–7	13–2
2008	Second Round	Willamette	W 30–27	13–2
2008	Quarterfinals	Wartburg	W 34–17	13–2
2008	Semifinals	Mary Hardin–Baylor	W 39–13	13–2
2008	Championship	Mount Union	L 26–31	13–2
2009	First Round	Lakeland	W 70–7	15–0
2009	Second Round	Illinois Wesleyan	W 45–7	15–0
2009	Quarterfinals	Wittenberg	W 31–13	15–0
2009	Semifinals	Linfield	W 27–17	15–0
2009	Championship	Mount Union	W 38–28	15–0
2010	First Round	Franklin	W 52–21	15–0
2010	Second Round	Trine	W 45–31	15–0
2010	Quarterfinals	North Central (IL)	W 20–10	15–0
2010	Semifinals	Wesley	W 27–7	15–0
2010	Championship	Mount Union	W 31–21	15–0
2011	First Round	Albion	W 59–0	15–0
2011	Second Round	Franklin	W 41–14	15–0
2011	Quarterfinals	Salisbury	W 34–14	15–0
2011	Semifinals	St. Thomas (MN)	W 20–0	15–0
2011	Championship	Mount Union	W 13–10	15–0
2013	First Round	St. Norbert	W 31–7	15–0
2013	Second Round	Franklin	W 33–3	15–0
2013	Quarterfinals	Linfield	W 28–17	15–0
2013	Semifinals	Mary Hardin–Baylor	W 16–15	15–0
2013	Championship	Mount Union	W 52–14	15–0
2014	First Round	Macalester	W 55–2	15–0
2014	Second Round	Wabash	W 38–14	15–0
2014	Quarterfinals	Wartburg	W 37–33	15–0
2014	Semifinals	Linfield	W 20–14	15–0
2014	Championship	Mount Union	W 43–34	15–0
2015	First Round	St. Norbert	W 48–0	12–2
2015	Second Round	Ohio Northern	W 42–7	12–2
2015	Quarterfinals	Wisconsin–Oshkosh	W 31–29	12–2
2015	Semifinals	Mount Union	L 6–36	12–2
2016	First Round	Lakeland	W 45–27	12–1
2016	Second Round	Wittenberg	W 37–9	12–1
2016	Quarterfinals	John Carroll	L 14–31	12–1
2018	First Round	Eureka	W 67–14	13–1
2018	Second Round	St. Norbert	W 54–21	13–1
2018	Quarterfinals	Bethel (MN)	W 26–12	13–1
2018	Semifinals	Mary Hardin–Baylor	L 14–31	13–1
2019	First Round	Monmouth (IL)	W 35–10	13–2
2019	Second Round	Wartburg	W 41–28	13–2
2019	Quarterfinals	Mary Hardin–Baylor	W 26–7	13–2
2019	Semifinals	Saint John's (MN)	W 35–32	13–2
2019	Championship	North Central (IL)	L 14–41	13–2
2021	First Round	Greenville	W 69–7	13–1
2021	Second Round	DePauw	W 45–0	13–1
2021	Quarterfinals	Central (IA)	W 51–21	13–1
2021	Semifinals	Mary Hardin–Baylor	L 7–24	13–1
2022	First Round	Aurora	L 28–33	8–3
2023	First Round	Bethel (MN)	W 42–14	11–2
2023	Second Round	Wheaton (IL)	W 49–42	11–2
2023	Quarterfinals	Wartburg	L 28–31	11–2
2025	Second Round	DePauw	L 23–26	8–3

=== NAIA Division I playoffs ===
The Warhawks made the NAIA Division I playoffs one time, finishing with a 1–1 record and advancing to the national title game.

Year	Round	Opponent	Result	Record
1966	Semifinals	Central (IA)	W 41–18	10–1
1966	Championship	Waynesburg	L 21–42	10–1

== Notable former players ==
=== Drafted ===
Year	Round	Pick	Overall	Player	Team	Position
1966	8	2	112	Vilnis Ezerins	Los Angeles Rams	RB
1967	15	19	386	Dennis Williamson	Cleveland Browns	DB
1970	12	11	297	Greg Jones	Denver Broncos	RB
1971	12	20	306	Kirk Behrendt	Los Angeles Rams	T
1972	10	12	246	Lon Kolstad	San Diego Chargers	LB
2007	7	39	249	Derek Stanley	St. Louis Rams	WR
2021	3	34	98	Quinn Meinerz	Denver Broncos	OG

=== Undrafted ===
Year	Player	First signed with	Position
1985	Bill Lobenstein	Denver Broncos	DE
1986	Lance Leipold	—	HC
1993	Matt Turk	Green Bay Packers	P
1998	Derrick LeVake	Cincinnati Bengals	T
2012	Matt Blanchard	Chicago Bears	QB
2015	Jake Kumerow	Cincinnati Bengals	WR
2019	Nate Trewyn	Tampa Bay Buccaneers	C
2022	Max Meylor	Green Bay Blizzard	QB
