= Dean Paul =

American football coach (born c. 1967)

Current position
- Title: Associate head coach & defensive coordinator
- Team: John Carroll
- Conference: NCAC

Biographical details
- Born: c. 1969 (age 56–57); Garrettsville, Ohio, U.S.

Playing career
- 1987–1990: Mount Union
- Position: Running back

Coaching career (HC unless noted)
- 1991–1992: Allegheny (GA)
- 1993–1994: Tulane (assistant)
- 1995–1997: Wooster (DC/DB)
- 1998: Fordham (WR)
- 1999–2003: Thomas More
- 2004–2023: Ohio Northern
- 2024: John Carroll (AHC/LB)
- 2025: John Carroll (AHC/DC/S)
- 2026–present: John Carroll (AHC/DC)

Head coaching record
- Overall: 161–89
- Tournaments: 3–3 (NCAA D-III playoffs)

Accomplishments and honors

Championships
- 2× OAC Coach of the Year (2010, 2015)

Records
- Winningest football coach in Ohio Northern University history.

Dean Paul (born c. 1969) is an American college football coach. He is the associate head football coach and defensive coordinator for John Carroll University, positions he has held since 2026. He was the head football coach at Ohio Northern University from 2004 to 2023 and Thomas More College from 1999 to 2003. He played college football as a running back at Mount Union College—now known as the University of Mount Union—from 1987 to 1990.

== Playing career ==
Paul earned eleven varsity letters at James A. Garfield High School in football, basketball, and baseball. He earned all-conference honors in all three sports. At Mount Union, he earned all Ohio Athletic Conference honors in 1988 and 1990 as a running back. As a senior he led the Purple Raiders in rushing, receiving yards and receptions in a first round playoff game against Allegheny.

== Coaching career ==
Following Paul's graduation from Mount Union in 1991, he was hired as a graduate assistant for Allegheny under head coach Ken O'Keefe.

In 1993, Paul joined Tulane as an assistant coach under head coach Buddy Teevens.

In 1995, Paul was named defensive coordinator and defensive backs coach for Wooster under head coach Jim Barnes. In his final year in 1997, he helped lead the team to a 9–1 record and a shared title of the North Coast Athletic Conference.

In 1998, Paul reunited with O'Keefe as his wide receivers coach for Fordham.

In 1999, Paul was named as the second all-time coach for Thomas More College—now known as Thomas More University—following the departure of Vic Clark. In his third season with the team he led them to their second all-time playoff appearance and first playoff win in 2001 as they finished the season going 11–1. In five seasons he went 40–12 with one playoff appearance.

In 2004, Paul was named head football coach for Ohio Northern University after interim head coach Stacey Hairston held the position for the 2003 season. In his twenty-year career with Ohio Northern he finished with an overall record of 121–77 including two postseason appearances in 2010 and 2015. Following the 2023 season, he announced his resignation from the school and ended his tenure as the program's all-time leader in wins.

In 2024, Paul was named assistant head coach for John Carroll University under head coach Jeff Behrman. After one season, he was promoted to defensive coordinator. Following the 2025 season, Behrman left to become the head coach for Bucknell, leaving Paul to be elevated to John Carroll's interim head coach.

== Head coaching record ==
| Year | Team | Overall | Conference | Standing | Bowl/playoffs | D3^{#} |
|---|---|---|---|---|---|---|
Thomas More Saints (NCAA Division III independent) (1999–2003)
| 1999 | Thomas More | 7–3 | | | | |
| 2000 | Thomas More | 9–1 | | | | |
| 2001 | Thomas More | 11–1 | | | L NCAA Division III Second Round | |
| 2002 | Thomas More | 7–3 | | | | |
| 2003 | Thomas More | 6–4 | | | | |
| Thomas More: | | 40–12 | | | | |
Ohio Northern Polar Bears (Ohio Athletic Conference) (2004–2023)
| 2004 | Ohio Northern | 8–2 | 7–2 | 2nd | | 19 |
| 2005 | Ohio Northern | 8–2 | 7–2 | T–2nd | | 18 |
| 2006 | Ohio Northern | 6–4 | 5–4 | T–4th | | |
| 2007 | Ohio Northern | 7–3 | 6–3 | 3rd | | |
| 2008 | Ohio Northern | 5–4 | 5–4 | T–3rd | | |
| 2009 | Ohio Northern | 8–2 | 7–2 | T–2nd | | 13 |
| 2010 | Ohio Northern | 10–2 | 8–1 | 2nd | L NCAA Division III Second Round | 8 |
| 2011 | Ohio Northern | 6–4 | 5–4 | T–4th | | |
| 2012 | Ohio Northern | 4–6 | 4–5 | 6th | | |
| 2013 | Ohio Northern | 6–5 | 5–4 | T–4th | | |
| 2014 | Ohio Northern | 7–3 | 6–3 | 4th | | |
| 2015 | Ohio Northern | 9–3 | 7–2 | T–2nd | L NCAA Division III Second Round | 19 |
| 2016 | Ohio Northern | 5–5 | 5–4 | T–4th | | |
| 2017 | Ohio Northern | 7–3 | 6–3 | T–2nd | | |
| 2018 | Ohio Northern | 5–5 | 4–5 | T–5th | | |
| 2019 | Ohio Northern | 6–4 | 6–3 | T–3rd | | |
| 2020–21 | Ohio Northern | 3–1 | 3–1 | 3rd | | |
| 2021 | Ohio Northern | 4–6 | 3–6 | 7th | | |
| 2022 | Ohio Northern | 3–7 | 3–6 | 7th | | |
| 2023 | Ohio Northern | 4–6 | 4–5 | 6th | | |
| Ohio Northern: | | 121–77 | 106–69 | | | |
| Total: | | 161–89 | | | | |
