= Scott Donaldson (American football) =

American football coach and former outside linebacker

Current position
- Title: Head coach
- Team: Heidelberg
- Conference: OAC
- Record: 68–38

Biographical details
- Born: Tonawanda, New York, U.S.

Playing career
- 2000–2003: Brockport
- Position: Outside linebacker

Coaching career (HC unless noted)
- 2004–2006: Heidelberg (GA)
- 2007–2010: Heidelberg (def. assistant)
- 2011–2015: Heidelberg (DC)
- 2016–present: Heidelberg

Head coaching record
- Overall: 68–38
- Tournaments: 0–1 (NCAA D-III playoffs)

Scott Donaldson is an American college football coach and former player. He is the head football coach for Heidelberg University, a position he has held since 2016. Donaldson played college football at State University of New York Brockport in Brockport, New York from 2000 to 2003.

== Head coaching record ==
Year	Team	Overall	Conference	Standing	Bowl/playoffs
Heidelberg Student Princes (Ohio Athletic Conference) (2016–present)
2016	Heidelberg	6–4	6–3	3rd	
2017	Heidelberg	7–3	6–3	T–2nd	
2018	Heidelberg	5–5	4–5	T–5th	
2019	Heidelberg	6–4	5–4	5th	
2020–21	Heidelberg	4–1	4–1	2nd	
2021	Heidelberg	8–2	7–2	T–2nd	
2022	Heidelberg	7–3	6–3	4th	
2023	Heidelberg	6–4	5–4	5th	
2024	Heidelberg	5–5	4–5	T–5th	
2025	Heidelberg	6–4	5–3	4th	
2026	Heidelberg	8–3	6–2	T–2nd	L NCAA Division III First Round
Heidelberg:		68–38	58–35		
Total:		68–38			
