= Luke Lehnen =

American football player (born 2002)

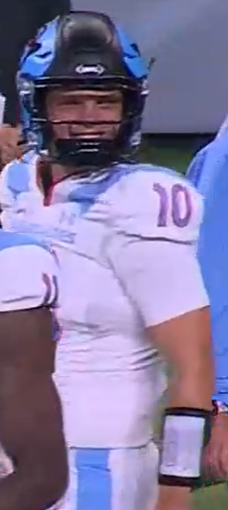
- Lehnen with the Arlington Renegades in 2025

No. 10 – Colorado Stampede
- Position: Quarterback
- Roster status: Active

Personal information
- Born: January 10, 2002 (age 24); Bloomington, Illinois, U.S.
- Listed height: 6 ft 1 in (1.85 m)
- Listed weight: 204 lb (93 kg)

Career information
- High school: Glenwood (Chatham, Illinois)
- College: North Central (IL) (2021–2024)
- NFL draft: 2025: undrafted

Career history
- Arlington / Dallas Renegades (2025–2026); Colorado Stampede (2027–present)

Awards and highlights
- 2× NCAA Division III champion (2022, 2024); 2× Gagliardi Trophy (2023, 2024); 2× D3Football.com Offensive Player of the Year (2023, 2024); 3× First-team All-CCIW (2021, 2023, 2024); Second-team All-CCIW (2022); NCAA Division III record: Most career touchdowns responsible for: 213

Luke Lehnen (born January 10, 2002) is an American professional football quarterback for the Colorado Stampede of the United Football League (UFL). While playing for North Central (IL), he won two Stagg Bowls and was the Gagliardi Trophy (Most outstanding Division III player) winner twice in 2023 and 2024. He has also played for the Arlington / Dallas Renegades.

== College career ==
=== 2021 ===
In Lehnen's true freshman season at North Central (IL), he started all 14 games. He led Division III football with 11.1 yards per passing attempt, a school record, ranked third in passing efficiency at 189.4, fifth in yards per completion with 16.8, eighth in yards, and tenth in touchdowns. North Central made it to the NCAA Division III football championship, commonly referred to as the Stagg Bowl, but subsequently lost to Mary Hardin–Baylor. He was selected First-team All-College Conference of Illinois and Wisconsin (CCIW).

=== 2022 ===
In 2022, Lehnen again started all 15 games that the Cardinals played. He ranked fourth nationally in passer rating at 192.0 and yards, while also ranking sixth in yards per pass, with 9.8. Aside from his passing stats, he also rushed for 1,034 yards and 13 touchdowns on 109 attempts. In the Stagg Bowl win against Mount Union, he completed a 94-yard pass, the longest in school history. He was subsequently named Second-team All-CCIW.

=== 2023 ===
Over 15 games, Lehnen led the nation in completion percentage and touchdown passes. He also set new national records for passer rating at 263.2, yards per pass at 14.7, yards per completion at 20.0, and touchdown percentage at 20.7%. He rushed for 170 yards against Wheaton, and set a school record for career rushing yards and touchdowns by a quarterback, with 2,348 and 36 respectively. Making their third Stagg Bowl in a row, North Central (IL) lost to Cortland by just one point, 38–37. He was selected First-team All-America by the Coaches Poll and D3football.com and selected Second-team All-America by the Associated Press. He also won his first Gagliardi Trophy.

=== 2024 ===
In his senior season, Lehnen started all 15 games, ranking first in the nation in efficiency and yards per pass, second in yards per completion, fourth in touchdown passes, sixth in yards, and 14th in completion percentage. In a 66-0 semifinal playoff win against Susquehanna, he tied the school record for completion percentage in a game with 94.1%, going 16 for 17. He led the Cardinals to another Stagg Bowl win, again over Mount Union. He was named Offensive Player of the Year and First-team All-American by both D3football.com and the Associated Press. Furthermore, he won the Gagliardi Trophy again, becoming just the second player to win it twice.

In four years of starting, Lehnen established new NCAA, including all divisions, records in passing efficiency at 211.9, touchdowns responsible for with 213, and consecutive games with a touchdown pass with 59. He also established new Division III records in total offensive yards with 15,985 and tied the record for touchdown passes with 51. He also became the first player in college football history to pass for at least 100 touchdowns and rush for at least 50.

=== Statistics ===
Season	Games		Passing								Rushing			
Season	GP	Record	Comp	Att	Pct	Yards	Avg	TD	Int	Rate	Att	Yards	Avg	TD
North Central Cardinals
2021	14	13–1	196	296	66.2	3,284	11.1	33	10	189.4	111	464	4.2	10
2022	15	15–0	189	276	68.5	2,709	9.8	38	6	192.0	109	1,034	9.5	13
2023	15	14–1	170	232	73.3	3,407	14.7	48	2	263.2	111	850	7.7	13
2024	15	15–0	196	283	69.3	3,258	11.5	43	5	212.6	99	979	9.9	15
Career	60	58−2	751	1,087	69.1	12,658	11.6	162	23	211.9	430	3,327	7.7	51

== Professional career ==
=== Arlington / Dallas Renegades ===
On January 15, 2025, Lehnen signed with the Arlington Renegades of the United Football League, bypassing the traditional draft process by signing immediately after the end of the college football season. He spent most of the 2025 season behind Luis Perez and Holton Ahlers as the Renegades' third-string quarterback. With Ahlers's retirement, Lehnen re-signed with the rechristened Dallas Renegades in October 2025, anticipating to fill the change-of-pace role that the recently retired Ahlers had filled, as Lehnen's mobility contrasts with Perez's traditional pocket-passing style and Renegades coach Bob Stoops has relied on rotating his quarterbacks situationally to give them playing time. He was re-signed on January 27, 2026, after initially not being included in the 2026 UFL draft, and after Stoops had retired and Rick Neuheisel had taken his place.

=== Colorado Stampede ===
Following the creation of the Colorado Stampede, the entire Renegades roster was transferred to the Stampede.
