= Brian Foos =

American football coach (born c. 1979)

Current position
- Title: Head coach
- Team: Capital
- Conference: OAC
- Record: 7–47

Biographical details
- Born: c. 1979 (age 46–47); Tiffin, Ohio, U.S.
- Education: Otterbein University (2003); Ohio Dominican University (2007)

Playing career
- 1998–2001: Otterbein
- Position: Offensive lineman

Coaching career (HC unless noted)
- 2002: Otterbein (OL)
- 2003: Ohio Wesleyan (DL)
- 2004–2007: Ohio Dominican (QB/TE)
- 2008: Ohio Dominican (OC)
- 2009–2016: Lindsey Wilson (AHC/OC)
- 2017–2018: Baldwin Wallace (AHC/OC)
- 2019: Madonna
- 2020–present: Capital

Head coaching record
- Overall: 7–47

Brian Foos (born c. 1979) is an American college football coach. He is the head football coach for Capital University, a position he has held since 2020. He was the head football coach for Madonna University in 2019. He also coached for Otterbein, Ohio Wesleyan, Ohio Dominican, Lindsey Wilson, and Baldwin Wallace. He played college football for Otterbein as an offensive lineman.

== Head coaching record ==
| Year | Team | Overall | Conference | Standing | Bowl/playoffs |
|---|---|---|---|---|---|
Capital Crusaders / Comets (Ohio Athletic Conference) (2020–present)
| 2020–21 | Capital | 0–4 | 0–4 | 10th | |
| 2021 | Capital | 2–8 | 1–8 | 9th | |
| 2022 | Capital | 0–10 | 0–9 | 10th | |
| 2023 | Capital | 1–9 | 1–8 | 9th | |
| 2024 | Capital | 1–9 | 1–8 | T–8th | |
| 2025 | Capital | 3–7 | 1–7 | T–7th | |
| 2026 | Capital | 0–0 | 0–0 | | |
| Capital: | | 7–47 | 4–44 | | |
| Total: | | 7–47 | | | |
