= Geoff Dartt =

American football player and coach

Current position
- Title: Head coach
- Team: Mount Union
- Conference: OAC
- Record: 74–8

Biographical details
- Born: 1981 or 1982 (age 44–45); Toledo, Ohio, U.S.

Playing career
- 2005–2007: Mount Union
- Position: Offensive lineman

Coaching career (HC unless noted)
- 2008–2009: Wheaton (IL) (TE/OT)
- 2010–2011: Wheaton (IL) (OL)
- 2012: Mount Union (OL)
- 2013–2016: Mount Union (OC)
- 2017: Western Kentucky (OL)
- 2018: Mount Union (TE)
- 2019: Mount Union (OC)
- 2020–present: Mount Union

Head coaching record
- Overall: 72–7
- Tournaments: 13–5 (NCAA D-III playoffs)

Accomplishments and honors

Championships
- 6 OAC (2020–2025)

Awards
- All-OAC (2007)

Geoff Dartt is an American college football coach. He is the head football coach for the University of Mount Union, a position he has held since 2020.

== Head coaching record ==
Year	Team	Overall	Conference	Standing	Bowl/playoffs	AFCA^{#}	D3^{°}
Mount Union Purple Raiders (Ohio Athletic Conference) (2020–present)
2020–21	Mount Union	4–0	4–0	1st			
2021	Mount Union	13–1	9–0	1st	L NCAA Division III Semifinal	4	4
2022	Mount Union	14–1	9–0	1st	L NCAA Division III Championship	2	2
2023	Mount Union	11–1	9–0	1st	L NCAA Division III Second Round	9	9
2024	Mount Union	14–1	9–0	1st	L NCAA Division III Championship	2	2
2025	Mount Union	11–1	8–0	1st	L NCAA Division III Third Round	6	6
2026	Mount Union	7–3	6–2	T–2nd			
Mount Union:		74–8	53–2				
Total:		74–8					
National championship Conference title Conference division title or championship game berth
