= Jim Hilvert =

American football coach

- Hilvert in 2025

Current position
- Title: Head coach
- Team: Baldwin Wallace
- Conference: OAC
- Record: 57–25

Biographical details
- Died: 1970 (age 55–56)
- Education: Saint Joseph's (IN); Western Michigan University

Coaching career (HC unless noted)
- ?–2006: Mount St. Joseph (AHC/DC)
- 2007–2014: Thomas More
- 2015–2016: La Salle HS (OH)
- 2017–present: Baldwin Wallace

Head coaching record
- Overall: 124–44 (college); 28–4 (high school)
- Tournaments: 2–4 (NCAA D-III playoffs)

Accomplishments and honors

Championships
- 6 PAC (2008–2011, 2013–2014)

James N. Hilvert Jr. (born November or December 1970) is an American college football coach. He is the head football coach for Baldwin Wallace University, a position he has held since 2017. Hilvert served as the head football coach at Thomas More College in Crestview Hills, Kentucky for 2007 to 2014.

== Head coaching record ==
=== College ===
Year	Team	Overall	Conference	Standing	Bowl/playoffs	D3^{#}
Thomas More Saints (Presidents' Athletic Conference) (2007–2014)
2007	Thomas More	4–6	2–4	T–4th		
2008	Thomas More	8–3	6–0	1st	L NCAA Division III First Round	
2009	Thomas More	11–1	6–0	1st	L NCAA Division III Second Round	14
2010	Thomas More	11–1	7–0	1st	L NCAA Division III Second Round	15
2011	Thomas More	9–2	7–1	1st	L NCAA Division III First Round	23
2012	Thomas More	7–3	6–2	3rd		
2013	Thomas More	9–1	7–0	T–1st		25
2014	Thomas More	8–2	7–1	T–1st		
Thomas More:		67–19	48–8			
Baldwin Wallace Yellow Jackets (Ohio Athletic Conference) (2017–present)
2017	Baldwin Wallace	6–4	5–4	T–5th		
2018	Baldwin Wallace	8–2	7–2	3rd		
2019	Baldwin Wallace	7–3	6–3	T–3rd		
2020–21	Baldwin Wallace	0–2	0–2	9th		
2021	Baldwin Wallace	8–2	7–2	T–2nd		
2022	Baldwin Wallace	7–3	7–2	T–2nd		
2023	Baldwin Wallace	6–4	6–3	4th		
2024	Baldwin Wallace	7–3	6–3	4th		
2025	Baldwin Wallace	8–2	6–2	3rd		
2026	Baldwin Wallace	0–0	0–0			
Baldwin Wallace:		57–25	50–23			
Total:		124–44				
^{#}Rankings from D3football.com.

=== High school ===
Year	Team	Overall	Conference	Standing	Bowl/playoffs
La Salle Lancers () (2015–2016)
2015	La Salle	13–2	1–2	3rd	Ohio D2 State Champions
2016	La Salle	13–2	3–0	1st	Ohio D2 State Champions
La Salle:		26–4	4–2		
Total:		26–4			
National championship Conference title Conference division title or championship game berth
