= Brad Spencer (American football) =

American football player and coach

Current position
- Title: Head coach
- Team: North Central (IL)
- Conference: CCIW
- Record: 67–3

Biographical details
- Born: c. 1981 (age 44–45)

Playing career
- 2000–2003: North Central (IL)
- Position: Wide receiver

Coaching career (HC unless noted)
- 2004–2014: North Central (IL) (WR)
- 2015–2021: North Central (IL) (OC)
- 2022–present: North Central (IL)

Head coaching record
- Overall: 67–3
- Tournaments: 18–2 (NCAA D-III playoffs)

Accomplishments and honors

Championships
- 2 NCAA Division III (2022, 2024); 4 CCIW (2022–2025)

Awards
- D3football.com National Coach of the Year (2024); 2× CCIW Coach of the year (2022, 2023)

Brad Spencer (born c. 1981) is an American college football coach and former player. He is the head football coach for North Central College, a position he has held since 2022. In his first and third seasons, Spencer led the 2022 and 2024 North Central Cardinals football teams to NCAA Division III football championship titles.

Spencer attended Naperville Central High School, where he played football and starred as a wide receiver. As a senior in 1999, he played on an undefeated Naperville Central team that won the Class 6A state championship. He played college football at North Central and graduated with program records for receptions, receiving yards, and receiving touchdowns. He joined the coaching staff at North Central in 2004 as wide receivers coach and was promoted to offensive coordinator in 2015.

== Head coaching record ==
Year	Team	Overall	Conference	Standing	Bowl/playoffs	AFCA^{#}	D3^{°}
North Central Cardinals (College Conference of Illinois and Wisconsin) (2022–present)
2022	North Central	15–0	9–0	1st	W NCAA Division III Championship	1	1
2023	North Central	14–1	9–0	1st	L NCAA Division III Championship	2	2
2024	North Central	15–0	9–0	1st	W NCAA Division III Championship	1	1
2025	North Central	14–1	9–0	1st	L NCAA Division III Championship	2	2
2026	North Central	9–1	7–1	2nd			
North Central:		67–3	43–1				
Total:		67–3					
National championship Conference title Conference division title or championship game berth
