= 2022 Saint John's Johnnies football team =

American college football season

2022 Saint John's Johnnies football

MIAC champion MIAC Northwoods Division champion

MIAC Championship Game, W 28–10 vs. Bethel

NCAA Division III Second Round, L 20–23 vs. Wartburg
- Conference: Minnesota Intercollegiate Athletic Conference
- Northwoods Division

Ranking
- AFCA: No. 6
- D3Football.com: No. 7
- Record: 10–2 (7–1 MIAC)
- Head coach: Gary Fasching (9th season)
- Offensive coordinator: Kole Heckendorf (4th season)
- Defensive coordinator: Jerry Haugen (46th season)
- Home stadium: Clemens Stadium

2022 Minnesota Intercollegiate Athletic Conference football standings
	Div			Conf.			Overall
Team	W		L	W		L	W		L
Northwoods Division
No. 6 Saint John's (MN) xy$^	4	–	0	7	–	1	10	–	2
Gustavus Adolphus	3	–	1	6	–	2	7	–	3
Carleton	2	–	2	5	–	3	7	–	3
St. Olaf	1	–	3	3	–	5	4	–	6
St. Scholastica	0	–	4	2	–	6	3	–	7
Skyline Division
No. 8 Bethel (MN) xy^	4	–	0	7	–	1	10	–	3
Augsburg	3	–	1	4	–	4	6	–	4
Concordia–Moorhead	2	–	2	3	–	5	5	–	5
Macalester	1	–	3	3	–	5	5	–	5
Hamline	0	–	4	0	–	8	2	–	8
Championship: Saint John's (MN) 28, Bethel (MN) 10
$ – Conference champion; x – Division champion/co-champions; y – Championship game participant; ^ – NCAA Division III playoff participant; Rankings from AFCA Poll

The 2022 Saint John's Johnnies football team represented Saint John's University as members of the Minnesota Intercollegiate Athletic Conference (MIAC) during the 2022 NCAA Division III football season. Led by ninth-year head coach Gary Fasching, the Johnnies compiled an overall record of 10–2 with a mark of 7–1 in conference play, winning the MIAC Northwoods Division title. Saint John's defeated Bethel in the MIAC Championship Game to win the conference title and earn an automatic bid to the NCAA Division III Football Championship playoffs. There, the Johnnies defeated the Northwestern (MN) in the first round before losing to the Wartburg in the second round. The team played home games at Clemens Stadium in Collegeville, Minnesota.

== Schedule ==
Saint John's 2022 regular season scheduled consisted of five home and four away games.

Date	Time	Opponent	Rank	Site	Result	Attendance
September 3	1:00 p.m.	No. 4 Wisconsin–Whitewater*	No. 5	Clemens Stadium; Collegeville, MN	W 24–10	12,462
September 10	1:00 p.m.	No. 19 Wisconsin–River Falls*	No. 4	Clemens Stadium; Collegeville, MN	W 37–34	9,104
September 24	1:00 p.m.	at No. 20 Bethel (MN)	No. 2	Royal Stadium; Arden Hills, MN	L 24–28	7,314
October 1	1:00 p.m.	Concordia–Moorhead^{†}	No. 6	Clemens Stadium; Collegeville, MN	W 35–28	8,277
October 8	1:00 p.m.	at Augsburg	No. 6	Edor Nelson Field; Minneapolis, MN	W 45–0	1,400
October 15	1:00 p.m.	at St. Olaf	No. 5	Klein Field; Northfield, MN	W 49–10	1,141
October 22	1:00 p.m.	Gustavus Adolphus	No. 5	Clemens Stadium; Collegeville, MN (Family Weekend)	W 41–27	13,161
October 29	1:00 p.m.	at St. Scholastica	No. 4	Public Schools Stadium; Duluth, MN	W 56–6	
November 5	1:00 p.m.	Carleton	No. 4	Clemens Stadium; Collegeville, MN	W 45-16	3,622
November 12	1:00 p.m.	No. 9 Bethel (MN)*	No. 5	Clemens Stadium; Collegeville, MN (MIAC Championship Game)	W 28–10	7,582
November 19	12:00 p.m.	Northwestern (MN)*	No. 4	Clemens Stadium; Collegeville, MN (NCAA Division III First Round)	W 49–0	1,159
November 26	12:00 p.m.	No. 12 Wartburg*	No. 4	Clemens Stadium; Collegeville, MN (NCAA Division III Second Round)	L 20–23	2,348
*Non-conference game; ^{†}Homecoming; Rankings from D3Football.com Poll released prior to the game; All times are in central time; Source:
