= Bill Nickell =

American football coach (born c. 1988)

Current position
- Title: Head coach
- Team: Defiance
- Conference: MSFA
- Record: 14–26

Biographical details
- Born: c. 1988 (age 37–38); Celina, Ohio, U.S.
- Education: Urbana University (2011)

Playing career
- 2007–2010: Urbana
- Position: Center

Coaching career (HC unless noted)
- 2011: Urbana (GA)
- 2012–2013: Urbana (OL/TE/S&C)
- 2014: Kent State (GA)
- 2015 (spring): Urbana (AHC/OL)
- 2015–2019: Lock Haven (OC/AHC/TE/OL/S&C)
- 2020: Lake Erie (AHC/OL)
- 2021: Arkansas–Pine Bluff (OL)
- 2022–present: Defiance

Head coaching record
- Overall: 14–26

Bill Nickell (born c. 1988) is an American college football coach. He is the head football coach for Defiance College, a position he has held since 2022. He also coached for Urbana, Kent State, Lock Haven, Lake Erie, and Arkansas–Pine Bluff. He played college football for Urbana as a center.

== Head coaching record ==
Year	Team	Overall	Conference	Standing	Bowl/playoffs
Defiance Yellow Jackets (Heartland Collegiate Athletic Conference) (2022–2023)
2022	Defiance	3–7	3–4	5th	
2023	Defiance	4–6	3–4	T–5th	
Defiance Yellow Jackets (Mid-States Football Association) (2024–present)
2024	Defiance	3–6	0–0	N/A (MEL)	
2025	Defiance	4–7	2–3	4th (MEL)	
2026	Defiance	0–0	0–0	(MEL)	
Defiance:		14–26	8–11		
Total:		14–26			
