= 2022 North Central Cardinals football team =

American college football season

2022 North Central Cardinals football

NCAA Division III champion CCIW champion

Stagg Bowl, W 28–21 vs. Mount Union
- Conference: College Conference of Illinois and Wisconsin

Ranking
- AFCA: No. 1
- D3Football.com: No. 1
- Record: 15–0 (9–0 CCIW)
- Head coach: Brad Spencer (1st season)
- Offensive coordinator: Eric Stuedemann (1st season)
- Offensive scheme: West Coast spread
- Defensive coordinator: Shane Dierking (4th season)
- Base defense: 4–3

2022 College Conference of Illinois and Wisconsin football standings
	Conf.			Overall
Team	W		L	W		L
No. 1 North Central (IL) $^	9	–	0	15	–	0
No. 17 Wheaton (IL) ^	8	–	1	8	–	3
Washington University	7	–	2	8	–	3
Carroll (WI)	5	–	4	6	–	4
Illinois Wesleyan	5	–	4	6	–	4
Augustana (IL)	4	–	5	5	–	5
Millikin	3	–	6	4	–	6
Carthage	3	–	6	3	–	7
North Park	1	–	8	1	–	9
Elmhurst	0	–	9	0	–	10
$ – Conference champion; ^ – NCAA Division III playoff participant; Rankings from AFCA Poll

The 2022 North Central Cardinals football team represented North Central College as a member of the College Conference of Illinois and Wisconsin (CCIW) during the 2022 NCAA Division III football season. In their first year under head coach Brad Spencer, the Cardinals compiled a 15–0 record (9–0 against conference opponents) and won the CCIW championship.

Through the first 14 games, the team's statistical leaders included Luke Lehnen with 2,568 passing yards, Ethan Greenfield with 1,878 rushing yards, 27 touchdowns, and 162 points scored, DeAngelo Hardy with 1,091 receiving yards, and BJ Adamchick with 86 tackles. Following completion of the season, Greenfield was awarded the Gagliardi Trophy, sometimes referred to as the Division III Heisman, and which is awarded to the Division III Player of the Year.

== Schedule ==
Date	Time	Opponent	Rank	Site	Result	Attendance	Source
September 10	12:00 p.m.	at Wabash*		Little Giant Stadium; Crawfordsville, IN	W 56–12	1,509	
September 17	1:00 p.m.	at Carthage		Art Keller Field; Kenosha, WI	W 59–7	1,376	
September 24	1:00 p.m.	Elmhurst	No. 1	Benedetti-Wehrli Stadium; Naperville, IL	W 76–6	1,393	
October 1	6:00 p.m.	No. 11 Wheaton (IL)	No. 1	Benedetti-Wehrli Stadium; Naperville, IL	W 33–20	6,000	
October 8	1:00 p.m.	at Carroll (WI)	No. 1	Schneider Stadium; Waukesha, WI	W 73–0	1,895	
October 15	1:00 p.m.	Millikin	No. 1	Benedetti-Wehrli Stadium; Naperville, IL	W 65–0	2,000	
October 22	1:00 p.m.	at No. 21 Washington University	No. 1	Francis Field; St. Louis, MO	W 31–0	2,442	
October 29	1:00 p.m.	North Park	No. 1	Benedetti-Wehrli Stadium; Naperville, IL	W 59–0	1,500	
November 5	1:00 p.m.	at Illinois Wesleyan	No. 1	Tucci Stadium; Bloomington, IL	W 68–3	633	
November 12	1:00 p.m.	Augustana (IL)	No. 1	Benedetti-Wehrli Stadium; Naperville, IL	W 63–3	2,500	
November 19	12:00 p.m.	Lake Forest*	No. 1	Benedetti-Wehrli Stadium; Naperville, IL (NCAA Division III First Round)	W 50–0	567	
November 26	12:00 p.m.	No. 15 Carnegie Mellon*	No. 1	Benedetti-Wehrli Stadium; Naperville, IL (NCAA Division III Second Round)	W 28–7	1,128	
December 3	12:00 p.m.	No. 9 Ithaca*	No. 1	Benedetti-Wehrli Stadium; Naperville, IL (NCAA Division III Quarterfinal)	W 48–7	917	
December 10	2:30 p.m.	No. 3 Mary Hardin–Baylor*	No. 1	Benedetti-Wehrli Stadium; Naperville, IL (NCAA Division III Semifinal)	W 49–14	1,662	
December 16	6:00 p.m.	vs. No. 2 Mount Union*	No. 1	Navy–Marine Corps Memorial Stadium; Annapolis, MD (Stagg Bowl)	W 28–21	3,231	
*Non-conference game; Rankings from AFCA Poll released prior to the game; All times are in Central time

== Personnel ==
2022 North Central Cardinals football team roster
Players
Coaches
Offense

Pos.	#	Name	Class
QB	1	Alex Porter	Fr
RB	2	Darius Byrd	Sr
WR	3	Jacob Paradee	So
WR	4	Rory Hills	So
QB	5	Luke Lehnen	So
WR	6	DeAngelo Hardy	Jr
WR	7	Jake Pieper	Fr
RB	8	Ethan Greenfield	Sr
WR	9	Peter Braithwaite	So
QB	10	Brendan Hernon	Fr
QB	11	Calvin Lavery	Fr
QB	12	Jake Johnson	Sr
WR	13	Joey Lombardi	Jr
WR	15	Javonte Rucker	So
TE	16	Alec Wolff	Sr
RB	18	Nathaniel Altepeter	Fr
QB	19	Alex Hobson	Fr
WR	19	Alexander Pratt	So
QB	19	Elijah Salem	So
RB	22	Jordan Chisum	So
RB	23	Kyle Franklin	Fr
RB	24	Joe Sacco	So
WR	25	Eddie Schmid	So
RB	27	Sam Carlson	Fr
RB	28	Aaron Vaughn	Fr
RB	30	Corey Phillips	Fr
RB	36	Roberto Alvarez	So
RB	42	Terrence Hill	Sr
OL	57	Jack Grupka	Jr
OL	58	Sam Pryor	So
OL	61	Derek Bex	Jr
OL	62	Max Ness	So
OL	64	David Fuchs	So
OL	65	Alex Knaperek	Fr
OL	67	Zach Fortier	Jr
OL	68	Max Manning	Fr
OL	70	Jeske Maples	So
OL	71	Ryan Kennelly	So
OL	71	Brock Nunez	Fr
OL	72	Will Ebert	Sr
OL	73	James Hart	Jr
OL	74	Frank Eleftheriou	Fr
OL	74	Jarod Thornton	Jr
OL	75	Nick Fehrle	So
OL	75	Patrick Jewell	Fr
OL	77	Jerred Durian	Fr
WR	80	John Michael Scumaci	So
WR	81	Jake Lynch	So
WR	82	Ethan Groark	Fr
WR	82	Thomas Skokna	Fr
WR	83	Rick Maziarka	Jr
WR	84	Joey Dugo	Fr
TE	84	Matt Robinson	Jr
WR	85	David Doerflinger	So
WR	86	Joey Staab	So
WR	86	Myles Walton	Fr
TE	87	Cody Hardt	Jr
TE	88	CJ Jensik	So
TE	89	Bobby Behmer	So
TE	98	Matt Quinn	Jr

Defense

Pos.	#	Name	Class
DB	1	Jahron Williams	So
DB	5	Julian Bell	Jr
LB	7	Angelo Cusumano	So
LB	7	Nick Motyka	So
DB	8	Nic Rummell	Jr
DL	9	Dan Gilroy	Sr
DB	10	Zack Orr	So
DB	11	Marcell Ellis	Jr
DB	12	Jake Brock	Fr
DB	14	Alex Gil	Fr
DB	14	Sam Taviani	Sr
DB	15	Jahmar Daniel	So
DB	17	Kelby James	So
DB	18	Josh Stevens	So
DB	20	Yasmani Rojas	So
DB	22	Gabriel Laughlin	Fr
DB	25	Randy Boisselle	Fr
DB	26	Antwain Walker	Jr
DB	28	Vaughn Teodoro	So
DB	29	Will Vernon	So
LB	30	Dylan Ross	Fr
DB	31	Garrett Fiduccia	Sr
DL	32	Will Kettelkamp	Jr
LB	33	Danny Nuccio	So
LB	34	BJ Adamchik	So
DL	35	Nic Laird	So
DB	36	Rahmareon Roby	Fr
DL	37	Zach Hartman	Jr
DB	38	Tommy Fitzpatrick	So
DB	39	Fabian Alvarez	So
LB	40	Dominic Rohrer	Fr
LB	41	Daniel Dominguez	Fr
LB	43	Theo Millas	Fr
LB	44	Adam Green	Jr
DL	48	Bryce Dorsey	So
DB	49	Riley McCurdy	So
LB	50	Gavin Bauknecht	Jr
LB	51	Noah Rapinchuk	Fr
LB	52	Christian Miller	So
LB	53	Drew Harp	Fr
DL	54	Philip Dozier	Fr
LB	55	Gustav Tosterud	Fr
DL	56	Sam Chapman	So
DL	60	John Sullivan	Fr
DL	63	Josh Sloan	So
DL	69	Ryan Ohlsen	Sr
DL	77	Myron Lewis	So
DL	90	Isaac Banker	So
DL	92	Brandon Greifelt	Sr
DL	97	Dan Lester	Jr
DL	99	Drew Hackler	Fr
DL	99	Tyler Rich	Sr

Special teams

Pos.	#	Name	Class
K	27	Tanner Rains	So
LS	59	Oscar Morgan	So

Head coach

- Brad Spencer

Coordinators/assistant coaches

- Shane Dierking – Assistant Head Coach/Defensive Coordinator/Linebackers Coach
- Eric Stuedemann – Offensive Coordinator/Offensive Line Coach/Recruiting Coordinator
- Colin Wood – Special Teams Coordinator/Cornerbacks Coach
- Joe Fehrle – Tight Ends Coach
- Kalus Murphy – Safeties Coach
- Daniel Packard – Graduate Assistant Coach - Linebackers
- Mavolio Grier – Defensive Line Coach
- Greg Jensik – Wide Receivers Coach
- Andrew Kamienski – Wide Receivers Coach
- Emonte Logan – Defensive Line Coach
- Dan Starkey – Running Backs Coach
- Dylan Warden – Wide Receivers Coach
- Blake Williams – Wide Receivers Coach
- Sharmore Clarke – Student Assistant Coach
- Sean Jacobs – Student Assistant Coach

Legend

- (C) Team captain
- (S) Suspended
- (I) Ineligible
- Injured
- Redshirt

Roster
