= Nate Jensen =

American football coach

Current position
- Title: Defensive coordinator
- Team: Saint Francis (IN)
- Conference: MSFA

Playing career
- 2000–2003: Defiance
- Position: Defensive end

Coaching career (HC unless noted)
- 2005–2009: Manchester (DL/LB)
- 2010–2016: Alma (DC)
- 2016–2022: Manchester
- 2023–present: Saint Francis (DC)

Head coaching record
- Overall: 20–47

Nate Jensen is an American college football coach. He is the defensive coordinator for the University of Saint Francis, a position he has held since 2023.

== Head coaching record ==
Year	Team	Overall	Conference	Standing	Bowl/playoffs
Manchester Spartans (Heartland Collegiate Athletic Conference) (2016–2022)
2016	Manchester	2–8	2–6	7th	
2017	Manchester	6–4	5–3	T–3rd	
2018	Manchester	4–6	4–4	5th	
2019	Manchester	4–6	3–4	5th	
2020–21	Manchester	0–7	0–5	8th	
2021	Manchester	3–7	3–4	T–5th	
2022	Manchester	1–9	0–7		
Manchester:		20–47	17–33		
Total:		20–47			
