= 2022 NCAA Division III football rankings =

Rankings for the 2022 NCAA Division III football season

- Season: 2022
- Postseason: Single-elimination
- Preseason No. 1: North Central (IL)
- National champions: North Central (IL)
- Conferences with most teams in final poll: ASC, Centennial Conference, CCIW, E8, MIAC, WIAC (2)

Two human polls and a committee's selections comprise the 2022 National Collegiate Athletic Association (NCAA) Division III football rankings. Unlike in Division I's Football Bowl Subdivision (FBS), the NCAA, Division III college football's governing body, bestows a national championship on the winner of the Stagg Bowl – the championship round of a 32-team postseason tournament. The main weekly poll that begins in the preseason is the D3football.com poll, which ranks the top 25 colleges in Division III football. The AFCA Division III Coaches Poll is released beginning midway through the season.

== Legend ==
	Increase in ranking
	Decrease in ranking
	Not ranked previous week
	Selected for Division III Football Championship Playoffs
(#–#)	Win–loss record
(Italics)	Number of first place votes
т	Tied with team above or below also with this symbol

== D3football.com poll ==
	Preseason Jul 27	Week 1 Sept 4	Week 2 Sept 11	Week 3 Sept 18	Week 4 Sept 25	Week 5 Oct 2	Week 6 Oct 9	Week 7 Oct 16	Week 8 Oct 23	Week 9 Oct 30	Week 10 Nov 6	Week 11 Nov 13	Final Dec 17	
1.	Mary Hardin–Baylor (23)	Mary Hardin–Baylor (1–0) (25)	North Central (IL) (1–0) (14)	North Central (IL) (2–0) (13)	North Central (IL) (3–0) (18)	North Central (IL) (4–0) (18)	North Central (IL) (5–0) (19)	North Central (IL) (6–0) (21)	North Central (IL) (7–0) (23)	North Central (IL) (8–0) (23)	North Central (IL) (9–0) (24)	North Central (IL) (10–0) (25)	North Central (IL) (15–0) (25)	1.
2.	North Central (IL)	North Central (IL) (0–0)	Saint John's (MN) (2–0) (7)	Saint John's (MN) (2–0) (6)	Mount Union (3–0) (5)	Mount Union (4–0) (5)	Mount Union (5–0) (5)	Mount Union (6–0) (4)	Mount Union (7–0) (2)	Mount Union (8–0) (2)	Mount Union (9–0) (1)	Mount Union (10–0)	Mount Union (14–1)	2.
3.	Mount Union (2)	Mount Union (1–0)	Mount Union (1–0) (4)	Mount Union (2–0) (4)	Wisconsin–Whitewater (2–1) (1)	Wisconsin–Whitewater (3–1) (1)	Wisconsin–Whitewater (4–1) (1)	Wisconsin–Whitewater (5–1)	Mary Hardin–Baylor (7–1)	Mary Hardin–Baylor (7–1)	Mary Hardin–Baylor (8–1)	Mary Hardin–Baylor (9–1)	Wartburg (13–1)	3.
4.	Wisconsin–Whitewater	Saint John's (MN) (1–0)	Wisconsin–Whitewater (1–1)	Wisconsin–Whitewater (2–1)	Mary Hardin–Baylor (3–1) (1)	Mary Hardin–Baylor (4–1) (1)	Mary Hardin–Baylor (5–1)	Mary Hardin–Baylor (6–1)	Saint John's (MN) (6–1)	Saint John's (MN) (7–1)	Linfield (8–0)	Saint John's (MN) (9–1)	Mary Hardin–Baylor (12–2)	4.
5.	Saint John's (MN)	Hardin–Simmons (1–0)	Mary Hardin–Baylor (1–1)	Mary Hardin–Baylor (2–1)	Trinity (TX) (3–0)	Trinity (TX) (4–0)	Saint John's (MN) (4–1)	Saint John's (MN) (5–1)	Linfield (6–0)	Linfield (7–0)	Saint John's (MN) (8–1)	Linfield (9–0)	Bethel (MN) (10–3)	5.
6.	Hardin–Simmons	Wisconsin–Whitewater (0–1)	Hardin–Simmons (1–0)	Hardin–Simmons (2–0) (1)	Saint John's (MN) (2–1)	Saint John's (MN) (3–1)	Trinity (TX) (5–0)	Linfield (5–0)	Trinity (TX) (7–0)	Trinity (TX) (8–0)	Trinity (TX) (9–0)	Trinity (TX) (10–0)	Trinity (TX) (11–1)	6.
7.	Linfield	Linfield (1–0)	Trinity (TX) (2–0)	Trinity (TX) (3–0) (1)	Linfield (2–0)	Linfield (3–0)	Linfield (4–0)	Trinity (TX) (6–0)	Johns Hopkins (7–0)	Wisconsin–La Crosse (7–1)	Wisconsin–La Crosse (8–1)	Wisconsin–La Crosse (9–1)	Saint John's (MN) (10–2)	7.
8.	Wheaton (IL)	Wheaton (IL) (0–0)	Linfield (1–0)	Linfield (2–0)	Johns Hopkins (4–0)	Johns Hopkins (5–0)	Johns Hopkins (5–0)	Johns Hopkins (6–0)	Wisconsin–La Crosse (6–1)	Hardin–Simmons (7–1)	Hardin–Simmons (8–1)	Wisconsin–Whitewater (8–2)	Linfield (10–1)	8.
9.	Trinity (TX)	Trinity (TX) (1–0)	Johns Hopkins (2–0)	Johns Hopkins (3–0)	Wisconsin–La Crosse (3–0)	Wisconsin–La Crosse (3–1)	Wisconsin–La Crosse (4–1)	Wisconsin–La Crosse (5–1)	Hardin–Simmons (6–1)	Bethel (MN) (7–1)	Bethel (MN) (8–1)	Hardin–Simmons (9–1)	Delaware Valley (12–1)	9.
10.	Johns Hopkins	Johns Hopkins (1–0)	Wheaton (IL) (0–1)	Wisconsin–La Crosse (3–0)	Hardin–Simmons (2–1)	Hardin–Simmons (3–1)	Hardin–Simmons (4–1)	Hardin–Simmons (5–1)	Wisconsin–Whitewater (5–2)	Wisconsin–Whitewater (6–2)	Wisconsin–Whitewater (7–2)	Ithaca (10–0)	Ithaca (12–1)	10.
11.	Muhlenberg	Bethel (MN) (1–0)	Wisconsin–La Crosse (2–0)	Wheaton (IL) (1–1)	Wheaton (IL) (2–1)	Bethel (MN) (3–1)	Bethel (MN) (4–1)	Bethel (MN) (5–1)	Bethel (MN) (6–1)	Cortland (8–0)	Cortland (9–0)	Susquehanna (10–0)	Hardin–Simmons (9–2)	11.
12.	Wisconsin–La Crosse	Wisconsin–La Crosse (1–0)	Central (IA) (2–0)	Ithaca (3–0)	Bethel (MN) (2–1)	Ithaca (4–0)	Ithaca (5–0)	Ithaca (6–0)	Ithaca (7–0)	Ithaca (8–0)	Ithaca (9–0)	Wartburg (10–0)	Wisconsin–La Crosse (9–2)	12.
13.	Bethel (MN)	Central (IA) (1–0)	Ithaca (2–0)	Cortland (3–0)	Ithaca (3–0)	Cortland (4–0)	Cortland (5–0)	Cortland (6–0)	Cortland (7–0)	Susquehanna (8–0)	Susquehanna (9–0)	Bethel (MN) (8–2)	Aurora (11–2)	13.
14.	Central (IA)	Delaware Valley (1–0)	Cortland (2–0)	Delaware Valley (3–0)	Cortland (3–0)	Wheaton (IL) (2–2)	Wisconsin–River Falls (4–1)	Delaware Valley (7–0)	Delaware Valley (8–0)	Delaware Valley (8–0)	Delaware Valley (9–0)	Delaware Valley (10–0)	Carnegie Mellon (11–1)	14.
15.	Delaware Valley	Cortland (1–0)	Delaware Valley (2–0)	Wisconsin–Oshkosh (2–1)	Delaware Valley (4–0)	Delaware Valley (5–0)	Wheaton (IL) (3–2)	Wheaton (IL) (4–2)	Wheaton (IL) (5–2)	Wheaton (IL) (6–2)	Wartburg (9–0)	Wheaton (IL) (8–2)	Wisconsin–Whitewater (8–3)	15.
16.	Cortland	Ithaca (1–0)	Wisconsin–Oshkosh (1–1)	Wisconsin–River Falls (2–1)	Wisconsin–Oshkosh (2–1)	Wisconsin–Oshkosh (3–1)	Delaware Valley (6–0)	Wartburg (7–0)	Wartburg (7–0)	Wartburg (8–0)	Wheaton (IL) (7–2)	Randolph–Macon (10–0)	Randolph–Macon (11–1)	16.
17.	Ithaca	Wisconsin–Oshkosh (1–0)	Wisconsin–River Falls (1–1)	Carnegie Mellon (3–0)	Wisconsin–River Falls (2–1)	Wisconsin–River Falls (3–1)	Wartburg (6–0)	Randolph–Macon (6–0)	Randolph–Macon (7–0)	Johns Hopkins (7–1)	Johns Hopkins (8–1)	Cortland (9–1)	Wheaton (IL) (8–3)	17.
18.	Wisconsin–River Falls	Muhlenberg (0–1)	Muhlenberg (1–1)	Randolph–Macon (3–0)	Carnegie Mellon (4–0)	Carnegie Mellon (5–0)	Randolph–Macon (5–0)	Carnegie Mellon (7–0)	Carnegie Mellon (8–0)	Randolph–Macon (8–0)	Randolph–Macon (9–0)	Johns Hopkins (9–1)	Cortland (9–2)	18.
19.	Wisconsin–Oshkosh	Wisconsin–River Falls (1–0)	Randolph–Macon (2–0)	Heidelberg (3–0)	Randolph–Macon (3–0)	Randolph–Macon (4–0)	Wisconsin–Oshkosh (3–2)	Susquehanna (6–0)	Susquehanna (7–0)	Carnegie Mellon (9–0)	Carnegie Mellon (9–0)	Carnegie Mellon (10–0)	Susquehanna (10–1)	19.
20.	RPI	Randolph–Macon (1–0)	Carnegie Mellon (2–0)	Bethel (MN) (1–1)	Susquehanna (4–0)	Wartburg (5–0)	Carnegie Mellon (6–0)	Albion (6–0)	Albion (7–0)	Albion (8–0)	Albion (9–0)	Huntingdon (8–1)	Utica (10–2)	20.
21.	Randolph–Macon	Salisbury (1–0)	Bethel (MN) (1–1)	Susquehanna (3–0)	Wartburg (4–0)	Susquehanna (5–0)	Susquehanna (5–0)	Huntingdon (5–1)	Wisconsin–River Falls (5–2)	Huntingdon (7–1)	Huntingdon (8–1)	John Carroll (8–2)	Johns Hopkins (10–1)	21.
22.	Salisbury	RPI (1–0)	Heidelberg (2–0)	Wartburg (3–0)	Albion (4–0)	Albion (5–0)	Albion (6–0)	Wisconsin–River Falls (4–2)	Wisconsin–Platteville (4–3)	John Carroll (7–1)	John Carroll (7–2)	Endicott (10–0)	Alma (11–1)	22.
23.	Hobart	Hobart (1–0)	Susquehanna (2–0)	Albion (3–0)	Central (IA) (2–1)	Huntingdon (4–1)	Huntingdon (4–1)	Washington (MO) (6–0)	Huntingdon (6–1)	Wisconsin–River Falls (5–3)	Endicott (9–0)	Alma (10–0)	John Carroll (8–2)	23.
24.	Heidelberg	Heidelberg (1–0)	Wisconsin–Platteville (1–1)	Central (IA) (2–1)	Huntingdon (3–1)	Central (IA) (3–1)	Washington (MO) (5–0)	Wisconsin–Oshkosh (3–3)	Wisconsin–Oshkosh (4–3)	Endicott (8–0)	Wisconsin–River Falls (5–4)	Albion (9–1)	Huntingdon (9–2)	24.
25.	Birmingham–Southern	Susquehanna (1–0)	Washington & Jefferson (2–0)	Union (NY) (3–0)	DePauw (4–0)	DePauw (5–0)	John Carroll (4–1)	John Carroll (5–1)	John Carroll (6–1)	Washington (MO) (7–0)	Birmingham-Southern (7–2)	Mount St. Joseph (10–0)	Springfield (9–3)	25.
	Preseason Jul 27	Week 1 Sept 4	Week 2 Sept 11	Week 3 Sept 18	Week 4 Sept 25	Week 5 Oct 2	Week 6 Oct 9	Week 7 Oct 16	Week 8 Oct 23	Week 9 Oct 30	Week 10 Nov 6	Week 11 Nov 13	Final Dec 17	
		Dropped: No. 25 Birmingham–Southern	Dropped: No. 21 Salisbury; No. 22 RPI; No. 23 Hobart	Dropped: No. 18 Muhlenberg; No. 24 Wisconsin–Platteville; No. 25 Washington & Jefferson	Dropped: No. 19 Heidelberg; No. 25 Union (NY)	None	Dropped: No. 24 Central (IA); No. 25 DePauw	None	Dropped: No. 23 Washington (MO)	Dropped: No. 22 Wisconsin–Platteville; No. 24 Wisconsin–Oshkosh	Dropped: No. 25 Washington (MO)	Dropped: No. 24 Wisconsin–River Falls; No. 25 Birmingham–Southern	Dropped: No.22 Endicott; No. 23 Albion; No. 25 Mount St. Joseph	

== AFCA Coaches Poll ==
	Week 3 September 19	Week 4 September 26	Week 5 October 3	Week 6 October 10	Week 7 October 17	Week 8 October 24	Week 9 October 31	Week 10 November 7	Week 11 November 14	Final December 19	
1.	North Central (IL) (2–0) (34)	North Central (IL) (3–0) (40)	North Central (IL) (4–0) (38)	North Central (IL) (5–0) (39)	North Central (IL) (6–0) (40)	North Central (IL) (7–0) (41)	North Central (IL) (8–0) (41)	North Central (IL) (9–0) (43)	North Central (IL) (10–0) (44)	North Central (IL) (15–0) (45)	1.
2.	Saint John's (MN) (2–0) (9)	Mount Union (3–0) (5)	Mount Union (4–0) (6)	Mount Union (5–0) (5)	Mount Union (6–0) (4)	Mount Union (7–0) (4)	Mount Union (8–0) (3)	Mount Union (9–0) (3)	Mount Union (10–0) (1)	Mount Union (14–1)	2.
3.	Mount Union (2–0) (2)	Mary Hardin–Baylor (3–1) (1)	Wisconsin–Whitewater (3–1) (1)	Wisconsin–Whitewater (4–1) (1)	Wisconsin–Whitewater (5–1) (1)	Mary Hardin–Baylor (7–1) (1)	Mary Hardin–Baylor (7–1) (2)	Mary Hardin–Baylor (8–1)	Mary Hardin–Baylor (9–1) (1)	Mary Hardin–Baylor (12–2)	3.
4.	Mary Hardin–Baylor (2–1) (1)	Wisconsin–Whitewater (2–1) (1)	Mary Hardin–Baylor (4–1) (1)	Mary Hardin–Baylor (5–1) (1)	Mary Hardin–Baylor (6–1) (1)	Linfield (6–0) (1)	Linfield (7–0) (1)	Linfield (8–0) (1)	Linfield (9–0) (1)	Wartburg (13–1)	4.
5.	Wisconsin–Whitewater (2–1)	Linfield (2–0)	Linfield (3–0) (1)	Linfield (4–0) (1)	Linfield (5–0) (1)	Trinity (TX) (7–0)	Trinity (TX) (8–0)	Trinity (TX) (9–0)	Trinity (TX) (10–0)	Trinity (TX) (11–1)	5.
6.	Hardin–Simmons (2–0) (1)	Trinity (TX) (3–0)	Trinity (TX) (4–0)	Trinity (TX) (5–0)	Trinity (TX) (6–0)	Johns Hopkins (7–0)	Saint John's (MN) (7–1)	Saint John's (MN) (8–1)	Saint John's (MN) (9–1)	Saint John's (MN) (10–2)	6.
7.	Linfield (2–0)	Johns Hopkins (4–0)	Johns Hopkins (5–0)	Johns Hopkins (5–0)	Johns Hopkins (6–0)	Saint John's (MN) (6–1)	Wisconsin–La Crosse (7–1)	Wisconsin–La Crosse (8–1)	Wisconsin–La Crosse (9–1)	Delaware Valley (12–1)	7.
8.	Trinity (TX) (3–0)	Wisconsin–La Crosse (3–0)	Saint John's (MN) (3–1)	Saint John's (MN) (4–1)	Saint John's (MN) (5–1)	Wisconsin–La Crosse (6–1)	Delaware Valley (8–0)	Delaware Valley (9–0)	Delaware Valley (10–0)	Bethel (MN) (10–3)	8.
9.	Johns Hopkins (3–0)	Saint John's (MN) (2–1)	Delaware Valley (5–0)	Wisconsin–La Crosse (4–1)	Wisconsin–La Crosse (5–1)	Delaware Valley (8–0)	Cortland (8–0)	Cortland (9–0)	Ithaca (10–0)	Linfield (10–1)	9.
10.	Wisconsin–La Crosse (3–0)	Delaware Valley (4–0)	Cortland (4–0)	Delaware Valley (6–0)	Delaware Valley (7–0)	Cortland (7–0)	Hardin–Simmons (7–1)	Hardin–Simmons (8–1)	Hardin–Simmons (9–1)	Ithaca (12–1)	10.
11.	Delaware Valley (3–0)	Cortland (3–0)	Wisconsin–La Crosse (3–1)	Cortland (5–0)	Cortland (6–0)	Hardin–Simmons (6–1)	Ithaca (8–0)	Ithaca (9–0)	Wisconsin–Whitewater (8–2)	Wisconsin–La Crosse (9–2)	11.
12.	Cortland (3–0)	Ithaca (3–0)	Ithaca (4–0)	Hardin–Simmons (4–1)	Hardin–Simmons (5–1)	Ithaca (7–0)	Bethel (MN) (7–1)	Bethel (MN) (8–1)	Wartburg (10–0)	Hardin–Simmons (9–2)	12.
13.	Ithaca (3–0)	Wheaton (IL) (2–1)	Hardin–Simmons (3–1)	Ithaca (5–0)	Ithaca (6–0)	Bethel (MN) (6–1)	Wisconsin–Whitewater (6–2)	Wisconsin–Whitewater (7–2)	Susquehanna (10–0)	Randolph–Macon (11–1)	13.
14.	Wheaton (IL) (1–1)	Hardin–Simmons (2–1)	Wisconsin–Oshkosh (3–1)	Bethel (MN) (4–1)	Bethel (MN) (5–1)	Wisconsin–Whitewater (5–2)	Wartburg (8–0)	Wartburg (9–0)	Randolph–Macon (10–0)	Carnegie Mellon (11–1)	14.
15.	Randolph–Macon (3–0)	Wisconsin–Oshkosh (2–1)	Bethel (MN) (3–1)	Wisconsin–River Falls (4–1)	Wartburg (7–0)	Wartburg (7–0)	Susquehanna (8–0)	Susquehanna (9–0)	Carnegie Mellon (10–0)	Aurora (11–2)	15.
16.	Wisconsin–Oshkosh (2–1)	Randolph–Macon (3–0)	Randolph–Macon (4–0)	Randolph–Macon (5–0)	Randolph–Macon (6–0)	Randolph–Macon (7–0)	Randolph–Macon (8–0)	Randolph–Macon (9–0)	Johns Hopkins (10–1)	Wisconsin–Whitewater (8–3)	16.
17.	Wisconsin–River Falls (2–1)	Wisconsin–River Falls (2–1)	Wisconsin–River Falls (3–1)	Wartburg (6–0)	Carnegie Mellon (7–0)	Carnegie Mellon (8–0)	Carnegie Mellon (9–0)	Carnegie Mellon (9–0)	Cortland (9–1)	Wheaton (IL) (8–3)	17.
18.	Heidelberg (3–0)	Bethel (MN) (2–1)	Carnegie Mellon (5–0)	Carnegie Mellon (6–0)	Albion (6–0)	Susquehanna (7–0)	Johns Hopkins (7–1)	Johns Hopkins (8–1)	Wheaton (IL) (8–2)	Alma (11–1)	18.
19.	Carnegie Mellon (3–0)	Carnegie Mellon (4–0)	Albion (5–0)	Albion (6–0)	Susquehanna (6–0)	Albion (7–0)	Albion (8–0)	Albion (9–0)	Huntingdon (8–1)	Cortland (9–2)	19.
20.	Albion (3–0)	Albion (4–0)	Wartburg (5–0)	Susquehanna (5–0)	Wheaton (IL) (4–2)	Wheaton (IL) (5–2)	Wheaton (IL) (6–2)	Wheaton (IL) (7–2)	Bethel (MN) (8–2)	Susquehanna (10–1)	20.
21.	Susquehanna (3–0)	Susquehanna (4–0)	Susquehanna (5–0)	Wisconsin–Oshkosh (3–2)	Washington (MO) (6–0)	Huntingdon (6–1)	Huntingdon (7–1)	Huntingdon (8–1)	Mount St. Joseph (10–0)	Johns Hopkins (10–1)	21.
22.	DePauw (3–0)	Wartburg (4–0)	Wheaton (IL) (2–2)	Wheaton (IL) (3–2)	Huntingdon (5–1)	Wisconsin–River Falls (5–2)	Mount St. Joseph (8–0)	Mount St. Joseph (9–0)	Alma (10–0)	Utica (10–2)	22.
23.	Wartburg (3–0)	DePauw (4–0)	DePauw (5–0)	Lake Forest (5–0)	Wisconsin–River Falls (4–2)	Mount St. Joseph (7–0)	Endicott (8–0)	Endicott (9–0)	Endicott (10–0)	Huntingdon (9–2)	23.
24.	Union (NY) (3–0)	Central (IA) (2–1)	Central (IA) (3–1)	Washington (MO) (5–0)	Mount St. Joseph (6–0)	Endicott (7–0)	John Carroll (7–1)	Alma (9–0)	Salisbury (9–1)	Mount St. Joseph (10–1)	24.
25.	Central (IA) (2–1)	Stevenson (4–0)	Lake Forest (4–0)	Huntingdon (4–1)	Endicott (6–0)	John Carroll (6–1)	Wisconsin–River Falls (5–3)	Salisbury (8–1)	Albion (9–1)	Endicott (10–1)	25.
	Week 3 September 19	Week 4 September 26	Week 5 October 3	Week 6 October 10	Week 7 October 17	Week 8 October 24	Week 9 October 31	Week 10 November 7	Week 11 November 14	Final December 19	
		Dropped: No. 18 Heidelberg; No. 24 Union (NY)	Dropped: No. 25 Stevenson	Dropped: No. 23 DePauw; No. 24 Central (IA)	Dropped: No. 21 Wisconsin–Oshkosh; No. 23 Lake Forest	Dropped: No. 21 Washington (MO)	None	Dropped: No. 24 John Carroll; No. 25 Wisconsin–River Falls	None	Dropped: No. 24 Salisbury; No. 25 Albion	
