= 2022 Wartburg Knights football team =

American college football season

2022 Wartburg Knights football

ARC champion

NCAA Division III Semifinal, L 31–34 at Mount Union
- Conference: American Rivers Conference

Ranking
- AFCA: No. 4
- D3Football.com: No. 3
- Record: 13–1 (8–0 ARC)
- Head coach: Chris Winter (2nd season)
- Offensive coordinator: Matt Wheeler (12th season)
- Defensive coordinator: Matt Tschetter (2nd season)
- Home stadium: Walston-Hoover Stadium

2022 American Rivers Conference football standings
	Conf.			Overall
Team	W		L	W		L
No. 4 Wartburg $^	8	–	0	13	–	1
Coe	6	–	2	7	–	3
Dubuque	6	–	2	6	–	4
Central (IA)	5	–	3	7	–	3
Loras	5	–	3	5	–	5
Buena Vista	3	–	5	4	–	6
Luther	2	–	6	2	–	8
Simpson (IA)	1	–	7	1	–	9
Nebraska Wesleyan	0	–	8	1	–	9
$ – Conference champion; ^ – NCAA Division III playoff participant; Rankings from AFCA Poll

The 2022 Wartburg Knights football team represented Wartburg College of as a member of the American Rivers Conference (ARC) during the 2022 NCAA Division III football season. Led by second-year head coach Chris Winter, the Knights compiled an overall record of 13–1 with a mark of 8–0 in conference play, winning the ARC title and earning an automatic bid to the NCAA Division III Football Championship playoffs. There, the Knights made it to their first ever national semifinal, losing to the eventual national runner up, Mount Union. The team played home games at Walston-Hoover Stadium in Waverly, Iowa.

== Schedule ==
Wartburg's 2022 regular season scheduled consisted of five home and five away games.

Date	Time	Opponent	Rank	Site	Result	Attendance
September 3	10:16 p.m.	at Monmouth (IL)*		April Zorn Stadium and Woll Memorial Field; Monmouth, IL	W 34–7	2,000
September 10	6:00 p.m.	Wisconsin–Stout*		Walston-Hoover Stadium; Waverly, IA	W 27–0	2,233
September 17	1:00 p.m.	Luther		Walston-Hoover Stadium; Waverly, IA	W 62–0	1,800
September 24	1:00 p.m.	at Dubuque	No. 22	Chalmers Field; Dubuque, IA	W 25–0	1,022
October 1	1:00 p.m.	Loras	No. 21	Walston-Hoover Stadium; Waverly, IA	W 42–3	2,200
October 8	1:00 p.m.	at No. 24 Central (IA)	No. 20	Ron and Joyce Schipper Stadium; Pella, IA	W 35–28	2,000
October 15	1:30 p.m.	Nebraska Wesleyan^{†}	No. 17	Walston-Hoover Stadium; Waverly, IA	W 65–0	5,013
October 29	1:00 p.m.	at Buena Vista	No. 16	J. Leslie Rollins Stadium and Peterson Field; Storm Lake, IA	W 65–0	700
November 5	1:00 p.m.	Simpson	No. 16	Walston-Hoover Stadium; Waverly, IA	W 81–9	1,205
November 5	1:00 p.m.	at Coe	No. 15	Clark Field; Cedar Rapids, IA	W 19–14	2,467
November 19	12:00 p.m.	No. 6 Wisconsin–La Crosse*	No. 12	Walston-Hoover Stadium; Waverly, IA (NCAA Division III First Round)	W 14–6	4,500
November 26	12:00 p.m.	at No. 4 Saint Johns (MN)*	No. 12	Clemens Stadium; Collegeville, MN (NCAA Division III Second Round)	W 23–20	2,348
December 3	12:00 p.m.	Aurora*	No. 12	Walston-Hoover Stadium; Waverly, IA (NCAA Division III Quarterfinal)	W 45–17	5,200
December 3	12:00 p.m.	at No. 2 Mount Union*	No. 12	Kehres Stadium; Alliance, OH (NCAA Division III Semifinal)	L 31–34	2,251
*Non-conference game; ^{†}Homecoming; Rankings from D3Football.com Poll released prior to the game; All times are in central time

== Rankings ==
Ranking movements Legend: ██ Increase in ranking ██ Decrease in ranking RV = Received votes
	Week												
Poll	Pre	1	2	3	4	5	6	7	8	9	10	11	Final
D3football.com	RV	RV	RV	22	21	20	17	16	16	16	15	12	3
AFCA	Not released			22	20	17	15	15	14	12	12	12	4

== Awards and honors ==
Individual awards
Player	Award
Owen Grover	ARC Defensive Player of the Year; D3football.com 1st team All-American; AP 2nd team All-American
Hunter Clasen	ARC Offensive Player of the Year; AP 1st team All-American; AFCA 2nd team All-American; D3football.com 3rd team All-American
Parker Rochford	AP 2nd team All-American; D3football.com 3rd team All-American
Riley Konrardy	D3football.com 4th team All-American
Tucker Kinney	D3football.com 4th team All-American
Coach	Award
Chris Winter	D3football.com National Coach of the Year; ARC Coach of the year

All-Conference
Player	Position	Team	Year
Jordan Downing	DL	1	SR
Riley Konrardy	DL	1	SR
Owen Grover	LB	1	SR
Nate Link	LB	1	SR
Parker Rochford	DB	1	SO
Hunter Clasen	RB	1	SR
Tucker Kinney	OT	1	JR
Sam Reyes	OG	1	SR
Nile McLaughlin	QB	1	SR
Tom Butters	TE	1	SR
Ben Bryant	RS	1	JR
Freddie Hosch	DL	2	SR
Cael O'Neill	K	2	JR
Drew Wyffels	DB	HM	SR
Ethan Stockwell	OT	HM	JR
HM = Honorable mention. Reference:
