= Bob Ritter =

American football coach (born 1960)

Biographical details
- Born: March 24, 1960 (age 66); Holden, Massachusetts, U.S.

Coaching career (HC unless noted)
- 1982–1987: Middlebury (DC)
- 1988–1995: Tufts (DC/OC)
- 1996–2000: Middlebury (assistant)
- 2001–2022: Middlebury

Head coaching record
- Overall: 112–61

Accomplishments and honors

Championships
- 3 NESCAC (2007, 2013, 2019)

Awards
- 3× NESCAC Coach of the Year (2007, 2013, 2019); Region I AFCA Coach of the Year (2007)

Bob Ritter (born March 24, 1960) is a retired American football coach. He was head football coach at Middlebury College, a position he held from the 2001 season to the 2022 season. His career began following the retirement of Mickey Heinecken, and he was replaced by Doug Mandigo. Ritter compiled a 112–61 record and won three New England Small College Athletic Conference (NESCAC) championships, in 2007, 2013 and 2019.

In 2019, Middlebury became the first team in NESCAC football history to finish with a 9–0 record, as the Panthers captured their fourth NESCAC title. The 2019 Middlebury squad joined the 8–0 teams of 1936 and 1972 as the only undefeated teams in school history. Ritter was awarded the 2019 D3football.com All-East Region Coach of the Year and 2019 Gridiron Club of Greater Boston - New England Division III Coach of the Year.

== Head coaching record ==
| Year | Team | Overall | Conference | Standing | Bowl/playoffs |
|---|---|---|---|---|---|
Middlebury Panthers (New England Small College Athletic Conference) (2001–2022)
| 2001 | Middlebury | 4–4 | 4–4 | T–4th | |
| 2002 | Middlebury | 4–4 | 4–4 | T–5th | |
| 2003 | Middlebury | 4–4 | 4–4 | T–5th | |
| 2004 | Middlebury | 4–4 | 4–4 | 5th | |
| 2005 | Middlebury | 3–5 | 3–5 | 6th | |
| 2006 | Middlebury | 6–2 | 6–2 | 3rd | |
| 2007 | Middlebury | 7–1 | 7–1 | 1st | |
| 2008 | Middlebury | 5–3 | 5–3 | T–3rd | |
| 2009 | Middlebury | 5–3 | 5–3 | 4th | |
| 2010 | Middlebury | 4–4 | 4–4 | T–4th | |
| 2011 | Middlebury | 4–4 | 4–4 | T–4th | |
| 2012 | Middlebury | 7–1 | 7–1 | 2nd | |
| 2013 | Middlebury | 7–1 | 7–1 | T–1st | |
| 2014 | Middlebury | 6–2 | 6–2 | 3rd | |
| 2015 | Middlebury | 5–3 | 5–3 | T–4th | |
| 2016 | Middlebury | 6–2 | 6–2 | T–3rd | |
| 2017 | Middlebury | 7–2 | 7–2 | T–2nd | |
| 2018 | Middlebury | 5–4 | 5–4 | T–4th | |
| 2019 | Middlebury | 9–0 | 9–0 | 1st | |
| 2020–21 | No team—COVID-19 | | | | |
| 2021 | Middlebury | 3–6 | 3–6 | T–7th | |
| 2022 | Middlebury | 7–2 | 7–2 | T–2nd | |
| Middlebury: | | 112–61 | 112–61 | | |
| Total: | | 112–61 | | | |
National championship Conference title Conference division title or championship game berth
