= 2022 Ohio Athletic Conference football season =

American college football season

- Sport: Football
- Teams: 10
- Champion: Mount Union

Football seasons
- 2021 2023

2022 Ohio Athletic Conference football standings
	Conf.			Overall
Team	W		L	W		L
No. 2 Mount Union $^	9	–	0	14	–	1
John Carroll	8	–	1	8	–	2
Baldwin Wallace	7	–	2	7	–	3
Heidelberg	6	–	3	7	–	3
Marietta	5	–	4	6	–	4
Muskingum	4	–	5	5	–	5
Ohio Northern	3	–	6	3	–	7
Wilmington (OH)	2	–	7	3	–	7
Otterbein	1	–	8	2	–	8
Capital	0	–	9	0	–	10
$ – Conference champion; ^ – NCAA Division III playoff participant; Rankings from d3football.com

The 2022 Ohio Athletic Conference football season was the season of college football played by the ten member schools of the Ohio Athletic Conference (OAC), sometimes referred to as the "Ohio Conference", as part of the 2022 NCAA Division III football season.

The conference's statistical leaders during the regular season were: Braxton Plunk of Mount Union with 308.7 passing yards per game and 36 passing touchdowns; Bryce Agnew of Marietta with 137.6 rushing yards per game; and Wayne Ruby Jr. of Mount Union with 132.1 receiving yards per game.

Mount Union compiled a perfect 10–0 regular-season record, won the OAC championship, and was ranked No. 2 in the final NCAA Division III poll. The team advanced to the NCAA Division III playoffs.

== Teams ==
=== Mount Union ===
2022 Mount Union Purple Raiders football

OAC champion

Stagg Bowl, L 21–28 vs. North Central
- Conference: Ohio Athletic Conference
- Record: 14–1 (9–0 OAC)
- Head coach: Geoff Dartt (3rd season)
- Defensive coordinator: Daryl Ely (2nd season)
- Home stadium: Kehres Stadium

The 2022 Mount Union Purple Raiders football team represented the University of Mount Union of Alliance, Ohio. In their third season under head coach Geoff Dartt, the Purple Raiders compiled a 10–0 regular-season record (9–0 against OAC opponents), and won the OAC championship. Mount Union advanced to the NCAA Division III Football Championship playoffs, beating Salisbury in the first round, Utica in the second round, Delaware Valley in the quarterfinals, Wartburg in the semifinals to meet North Central in the 2022 Stagg Bowl.

Date	Opponent	Rank	Site	Result	Attendance	Source
September 3	Defiance*		Kehres Stadium; Alliance, OH	W 65–0	1,824	
September 17	Marietta		Kehres Stadium; Alliance, OH	W 55–7	2,579	
September 24	at Muskingum	No. 3	Bullock Health and Wellness Complex; New Concord, OH	W 59–0	1,350	
October 1	at Ohio Northern	No. 2	Dial-Roberson Stadium; Ada, OH	W 45–0	2,317	
October 8	Heidelberg^{†}	No. 2	Kehres Stadium; Alliance, OH	W 28–6	1,615	
October 15	at Capital	No. 2	Bernlohr Stadium; Columbus, OH	W 49–14	2,896	
October 22	Wilmington	No. 2	Kehres Stadium; Alliance, OH	W 63–3	1,651	
October 29	at Otterbein	No. 2	Memorial Stadium; Westerville, OH	W 59–0	1,863	
November 5	No. 22 John Carroll	No. 2	Kehres Stadium; Alliance, OH	W 34–28	4,009	
November 12	at Baldwin Wallace	No. 2	Tressel Field at George Finnie Stadium; Berea, OH	W 23–21	4,386	
November 19	No. 24 Salisbury*	No. 2	Kehres Stadium; Alliance, OH (NCAA Division III First Round)	W 51–0	1,600	
November 26	Utica*	No. 2	Kehres Stadium; Alliance, OH (NCAA Division III Second Round)	W 45–7	1,480	
December 3	at No. 8 Delaware Valley*	No. 2	Robert A. Lipinski Field; Doylestown, PA (NCAA Division III Quarterfinal)	W 22–6	890	
December 10	No. 12 Wartburg*	No. 2	Kehres Stadium; Alliance, OH (NCAA Division III Semifinal)	W 34–31	2,251	
December 16	No. 1 North Central (IL)*	No. 2	Navy–Marine Corps Memorial Stadium; Annapolis, MD (Stagg Bowl XLIX)	L 21–28	3,231	
*Non-conference game; ^{†}Homecoming; Rankings from AFCA Poll released prior to the game

=== John Carroll ===
2022 John Carroll Blue Streaks football
- Conference: Ohio Athletic Conference
- Record: 8–2 (8–1 OAC)
- Head coach: Drew Nystrom (interim; 1st season)
- Defensive coordinator: Jeff Long Jr. (3rd season)
- Home stadium: Don Shula Stadium at Wasmer Field

The 2022 John Carroll Blue Streaks football team represented John Carroll University of University Heights, Ohio. In their first year under interim head coach Drew Nystrom, the Blue Streaks compiled an 8–2 record (8–1 against OAC opponents) and finished in second place in the OAC.

Date	Opponent	Site	Result	Attendance	Source
September 3	at Washington & Jefferson*	Cameron Stadium; Washington, PA	L 25–35	3,026	
September 17	Baldwin Wallace	Don Shula Stadium at Wasmer Field; University Heights, OH	W 21–7	2,025	
September 24	Heidelberg	Don Shula Stadium at Wasmer Field; University Heights, OH	W 24–7	2,512	
October 1	at Wilmington	Townsend Field at Williams Stadium; Wilmington, OH	W 59–0	543	
October 8	Marietta	Don Shula Stadium at Wasmer Field; University Heights, OH	W 45–10	2,003	
October 15	at Ohio Northern	Dial-Roberson Stadium; Ada, OH	W 24–7	2,146	
October 22	Capital	Don Shula Stadium at Wasmer Field; University Heights, OH	W 42–10	1,314	
October 29	at Muskingum	Bullock Health and Wellness Complex; New Concord, OH	W 49–14	1,689	
November 5	at Mount Union	Kehres Stadium; Alliance, OH	L 28–34	4,009	
November 12	Otterbein	Don Shula Stadium at Wasmer Field; University Heights, OH	W 62–7	1,042	
*Non-conference game

=== Baldwin Wallace ===
2022 Baldwin–Wallace Yellow Jackets football
- Conference: Ohio Athletic Conference
- Record: 7–3 (7–2 OAC)
- Head coach: Jim Hilvert (6th season)
- Defensive coordinator: Ethan Nichols (1st season)
- Home stadium: Tressel Field at George Finnie Stadium

The 2022 Baldwin Wallace Yellow Jackets football team represented Baldwin Wallace University of Berea, Ohio. In their sixth season under head coach Jim Hilvert, the Yellow Jackets compiled a 7–3 record (7–2 against OAC opponents) and finished in third place in the OAC.

Date	Opponent	Site	Result	Attendance	Source
September 3	at Mount St. Joseph*	Schueler Field; Cincinnati, OH	L 28–31	0	
September 10	at Wilmington	Townsend Field at Williams Stadium; Wilmington, OH	W 13–12	765	
September 17	at John Carroll	Don Shula Stadium at Wasmer Field; University Heights, OH	L 7–21	2,025	
September 24	Ohio Northern	Tressel Field at George Finnie Stadium; Berea, OH	W 35–31	3,826	
October 1	at Marietta	Don Drumm Stadium; Marietta, OH	W 33–29	1,042	
October 15	Muskingum	Tressel Field at George Finnie Stadium; Berea, OH	W 35–21	2,347	
October 22	Otterbein	Tressel Field at George Finnie Stadium; Berea, OH	W 35–14	4,972	
October 29	at Capital	Bernlohr Stadium; Columbus, OH	W 48–7	2,765	
November 5	at Heidelberg	Hoernemann Stadium; Tiffin, OH	W 21–20 ^{OT}	2,433	
November 12	Mount Union	Tressel Field at George Finnie Stadium; Berea, OH	L 21–23	4,386	
*Non-conference game

=== Heidelberg ===
2022 Heidelberg Student Princes football
- Conference: Ohio Athletic Conference
- Record: 7–3 (6–3 OAC)
- Head coach: Scott Donaldson (7th season)
- Offensive coordinator: Jason Lewis (7th season)
- Defensive coordinator: Branden Jakubcin (7th season)
- Home stadium: Hoernemann Stadium

The 2022 Heidelberg Student Princes football team represented the Heidelberg University of Tiffin, Ohio. In their seventh season under head coach Scott Donaldson, the Student Princes compiled a 7–3 record (6–3 against OAC opponents) and finished in fourth place in the OAC.

Date	Opponent	Site	Result	Attendance	Source
September 3	Adrian*	Hoernemann Stadium; Tiffin, OH	W 31–0	2,212	
September 10	at Otterbein	Memorial Stadium; Westerville, OH	W 34–7	2,311	
September 17	Ohio Northern	Hoernemann Stadium; Tiffin, OH	W 37–3	3,122	
September 24	at John Carroll	Don Shula Stadium at Wasmer Field; University Heights, OH	L 7–24	2,512	
October 1	Muskingum	Hoernemann Stadium; Tiffin, OH	W 42–21	2,831	
October 8	at Mount Union	Kehres Stadium; Alliance, OH	L 6–28	1,615	
October 22	Marietta	Hoernemann Stadium; Tiffin, OH	W 29–21	3,122	
October 29	at Wilmington	Townsend Field at Williams Stadium; Wilmington, OH	W 57–7	1,157	
November 5	Baldwin Wallace	Hoernemann Stadium; Tiffin, OH	L 20–21 ^{OT}	2,433	
November 12	at Capital	Bernlohr Stadium; Columbus, OH	W 44–30	1,898	
*Non-conference game

=== Marietta ===
2022 Marietta Pioneers football
- Conference: Ohio Athletic Conference
- Record: 6–4 (5–4 OAC)
- Head coach: Andy Waddle (10th season)
- Offensive coordinator: Reed Florence (1st season)
- Defensive coordinator: Zach Feltrop (4th season)
- Home stadium: Don Drumm Stadium

The 2022 Marietta Pioneers football team represented the Marietta College of Marietta, Ohio. In their tenth season under head coach Andy Waddle, the Pioneers compiled a 6–4 record (5–4 against OAC opponents) and finished in fifth place in the OAC.

Date	Opponent	Site	Result	Attendance	Source
September 3	Dubuque*	Don Drumm Stadium; Marietta, OH	W 14–13	1,042	
September 17	at Mount Union	Kehres Stadium; Alliance, OH	L 7–55	2,579	
September 24	at Otterbein	Memorial Stadium; Westerville, OH	W 27–10	1,986	
October 1	Baldwin Wallace	Don Drumm Stadium; Marietta, OH	L 29–33	1,042	
October 8	at John Carroll	Don Shula Stadium at Wasmer Field; University Heights, OH	L 10–45	2,003	
October 15	Wilmington	Don Drumm Stadium; Marietta, OH	W 34–0	2,242	
October 22	at Heidelberg	Hoernemann Stadium; Tiffin, OH	L 21–29	3,122	
October 29	Ohio Northern	Don Drumm Stadium; Marietta, OH	W 27–10	1,642	
November 5	Capital	Don Drumm Stadium; Marietta, OH	W 50–14	2,042	
November 12	at Muskingum	Bullock Health and Wellness Complex; New Concord, OH	W 38–23	1,756	
*Non-conference game

=== Muskingum ===
2022 Muskingum Fighting Muskies football
- Conference: Ohio Athletic Conference
- Record: 5–5 (4–5 OAC)
- Head coach: Erik Ieuter (5th season)
- Home stadium: Bullock Health and Wellness Complex

The 2022 Muskingum Fighting Muskies football team represented Muskingum University of New Concord, Ohio. In their fifth season under head coach Erik Leuter, the Fighting Muskies compiled a 5–5 record (4–5 against OAC opponents) and finished in sixth place in the OAC.

Date	Opponent	Site	Result	Attendance	Source
September 10	at Ferrum	W.B. Adams Stadium; Ferrum, VA	W 31–3	1,200	
September 17	Capital	Bullock Health and Wellness Complex; New Concord, OH	W 37–7	2,900	
September 24	Mount Union	Bullock Health and Wellness Complex; New Concord, OH	L 0–59	1,350	
October 1	at Heidelberg	Hoernemann Stadium; Tiffin, OH	L 21–42	2,831	
October 8	Otterbein	Bullock Health and Wellness Complex; New Concord, OH	W 41–35 ^{2OT}		
October 15	at Baldwin Wallace	Tressel Field at George Finnie Stadium; Berea, OH	L 21–35		
October 22	at Ohio Northern	Dial-Roberson Stadium; Ada, OH	W 23–7	2,964	
October 29	John Carroll	Bullock Health and Wellness Complex; New Concord, OH	L 14–49	1,689	
November 5	at Wilmington	Townsend Field at Williams Stadium; Wilmington, OH	W 27–13	781	
November 12	Marietta	Bullock Health and Wellness Complex; New Concord, OH	L 23–38	1,756	

=== Ohio Northern ===
2022 Ohio Northern Polar Bears football
- Conference: Ohio Athletic Conference
- Record: 3–7 (3–6 OAC)
- Head coach: Dean Paul (19th season)
- Home stadium: Dial-Roberson Stadium

The 2022 Ohio Northern Polar Bears football team represented Ohio Northern University of Ada, Ohio. In their 19th year under head coach Dean Paul, the Polar Bears compiled a 3–7 record (3–6 against OAC opponents) and finished in seventh place in the OAC.

Date	Opponent	Site	Result	Attendance	Source
September 3	Alma	Dial-Roberson Stadium; Ada, OH	L 13–16	1,673	
September 10	at Capital	Bernlohr Stadium; Columbus, OH	W 28–13	2,784	
September 17	at Heidelberg	Hoernemann Stadium; Tiffin, OH	L 3–37	3,122	
September 24	at Baldwin Wallace	Tressel Field at George Finnie Stadium; Berea, OH	L 31–35	3,826	
October 1	Mount Union	Dial-Roberson Stadium; Ada, OH	L 0–45	2,146	
October 15	John Carroll	Dial-Roberson Stadium; Ada, OH	L 7–24		
October 22	Muskingum	Dial-Roberson Stadium; Ada, OH	L 7–23	2,964	
October 29	at Marietta	Don Drumm Stadium; Marietta, OH	L 10–27	1,642	
November 5	at Otterbein	Memorial Stadium; Westerville, OH	W 42–7	2,222	
November 12	Wilmington	Dial-Roberson Stadium; Ada, OH	W 21–13	1,786	

=== Wilmington ===
2022 Wilmington Quakers football
- Conference: Ohio Athletic Conference
- Record: 3–7 (2–7 OAC)
- Head coach: Bryan Moore
- Home stadium: Townsend Field at Williams Stadium

The 2022 Wilmington Quakers football team represented Wilmington College of Wilmington, Ohio. Led by head coach Bryan Moore, the Quakers compiled a 3–7 record (2–7 against OAC opponents) and finished in eighth place in the OAC.

Date	Opponent	Site	Result	Attendance	Source
September 1	at Southern Virginia*	Knight Stadium; Buena Vista, VA	W 52–27	302	
September 10	Baldwin Wallace	Townsend Field at Williams Stadium; Wilmington, OH	L 12–13	765	
September 17	Otterbein	Townsend Field at Williams Stadium; Wilmington, OH	W 32–26	1,164	
September 24	at Capital	Bernlohr Stadium; Columbus, OH	W 34–31	3,478	
October 1	John Carroll	Townsend Field at Williams Stadium; Wilmington, OH	L 0–59	543	
October 15	at Marietta	Don Drumm Stadium; Marietta, OH	L 0–34	2,242	
October 22	at Mount Union	Kehres Stadium; Alliance, OH	L 3–63	1,651	
October 29	Heidelberg	Townsend Field at Williams Stadium; Wilmington, OH	L 7–57	1,157	
November 5	Muskingum	Townsend Field at Williams Stadium; Wilmington, OH	L 13–27	781	
November 12	at Ohio Northern	Dial-Roberson Stadium; Ada, OH	L 13–21	1,786	
*Non-conference game

=== Otterbein ===
2022 Otterbein Cardinals football
- Conference: Ohio Athletic Conference
- Record: 2–8 (1–8 OAC)
- Head coach: Tim Doup (11th season)
- Home stadium: Memorial Stadium

The 2022 Otterbein Cardinals football team represented Otterbein University of Westerville, Ohio. In their 11th season under head coach Tim Doup, the Cardinals compiled a 2–8 record (1–8 against OAC opponent) and finished in ninth place in the OAC.

Date	Opponent	Site	Result	Attendance	Source
September 3	at Ohio Wesleyan*	Selby; Delaware, OH	W 21–13	1,525	
September 10	Heidelberg	Memorial Stadium; Westerville, OH	L 7–34	2,311	
September 17	at Wilmington	Townsend Field at Williams Stadium; Wilmington, OH	L 26–32	1,164	
September 24	Marietta	Memorial Stadium; Westerville, OH	L 10–27	1,986	
October 1	Capital	Memorial Stadium; Westerville, OH	W 35–28	2,864	
October 8	at Muskingum	Bullock Health and Wellness Complex; New Concord, OH	L 35–41 ^{2OT}	1,675	
October 22	at Baldwin Wallace	Tressel Field at George Finnie Stadium; Berea, OH	L 14–35	4,972	
October 29	Mount Union	Memorial Stadium; Westerville, OH	L 0–59	1,863	
November 5	Ohio Northern	Memorial Stadium; Westerville, OH	L 7–42	2,222	
November 12	at John Carroll	Don Shula Stadium at Wasmer Field; University Heights, OH	L 7–62	1,042	
*Non-conference game

=== Capital ===
2022 Capital Comets football
- Conference: Ohio Athletic Conference
- Record: 0–10 (0–9 OAC)
- Head coach: Brian Foos (3rd season)
- Home stadium: Bernlohr Stadium

The 2022 Capital Comets football team represented Capital University of Columbus, Ohio. In their third season under head coach Brian Foos, the Comets compiled a 0–10 record (0–9 against OAC opponent) and finished in last place in the OAC.

Date	Opponent	Site	Result	Attendance	Source
September 3	at Denison*	Deeds Field-Piper Stadium; Granville, OH	L 31–48	800	
September 10	Ohio Northern	Bernlohr Stadium; Columbus, OH	L 13–28	2,784	
September 17	at Muskingum	Bullock Health and Wellness Complex; New Concord, OH	L 7–37	2,900	
September 24	Wilmington	Bernlohr Stadium; Columbus, OH	L 31–34	3,478	
October 1	at Otterbein	Memorial Stadium; Westerville, OH	L 28–35	2,864	
October 15	Mount Union	Bernlohr Stadium; Columbus, OH	L 14–49	2,896	
October 22	at John Carroll	Don Shula Stadium at Wasmer Field; University Heights, OH	L 10–42	1,314	
October 29	Baldwin Wallace	Bernlohr Stadium; Columbus, OH	L 7–48	2,765	
November 5	at Marietta	Don Drumm Stadium; Marietta, OH	L 14–50	2,042	
November 12	Heidelberg	Bernlohr Stadium; Columbus, OH	L 30–44	1,898	
*Non-conference game
