= Tim Doup =

American football coach (born c. 1967)

Current position
- Title: Athletic director
- Team: Fredericktown HS (OH)

Biographical details
- Born: c. 1967 (age 58–59); Delaware, Ohio, U.S.
- Education: Otterbein University (1992); Marygrove College (2002)

Playing career

Football
- 1986–1990: Otterbein
- Position: Center

Coaching career (HC unless noted)

Football
- 1991–1994: Olentangy HS (OH) (assistant)
- 1995–2002: Upper Arlington HS (OH) (OC)
- 2003–2011: Otterbein (OC)
- 2012–2022: Otterbein

Wrestling
- 1991–2002: Upper Arlington HS (OH) (assistant)

Track
- 1991–1995: Olentangy HS (OH) (assistant)

Administrative career (AD unless noted)
- 2012–2022: Otterbein (assistant AD)
- 2023–present: Fredericktown HS (OH)

Head coaching record
- Overall: 41–64

Accomplishments and honors

Awards
- 2× OAC Coach of the Year (2012, 2019)

Tim Doup (born c. 1967) is an American former college football coach and current high school athletic director. He is the athletic director for Fredericktown High School, a position he has held since 2023. He was the head football coach for Otterbein University from 2012 to 2022. He also coached high school football, track, and wrestling for Olentangy High School and high school wrestling and football for Upper Arlington High School. He was the assistant athletic director for Otterbein from 2012 to 2022. He played college football for Otterbein as a center.

== Head coaching record ==
Year	Team	Overall	Conference	Standing	Bowl/playoffs
Otterbein Cardinals (Ohio Athletic Conference) (2012–2022)
2012	Otterbein	8–2	7–2	3rd	
2013	Otterbein	5–5	5–4	T–4th	
2014	Otterbein	5–5	5–4	5th	
2015	Otterbein	4–6	4–5	6th	
2016	Otterbein	5–5	5–4	T–4th	
2017	Otterbein	6–4	5–4	T–5th	
2018	Otterbein	2–8	1–8	9th	
2019	Otterbein	2–8	2–7	T–8th	
2020–21	Otterbein	1–4	1–4	8th	
2021	Otterbein	1–9	1–8	T–9th	
2022	Otterbein	2–8	1–8	9th	
Otterbein:		41–64	37–58		
Total:		41–64			
