= 2022 Stagg Bowl =

NCAA Division III college football championship game

2022 NCAA Division III Football Championship
- Stagg Bowl XLIX
Mount Union Purple Raiders	North Central Cardinals
(14–0)	(14–0)
OAC	CCIW
21	28
Head coach: Geoff Dartt	Head coach: Brad Spencer
Seed 2	Seed 1
	1	2	3	4	Total
Mount Union	0	0	0	21	21
North Central	7	7	0	14	28
- Date: December 16, 2022
- Season: 2022
- Stadium: Navy–Marine Corps Memorial Stadium
- Location: Annapolis, Maryland
- Attendance: 3,231

United States TV coverage
- Network: ESPNU

The 2022 NCAA Division III Football Championship Game, more commonly referred to as the 2022 Stagg Bowl or Stagg Bowl XLIX, was a postseason college football game played on December 16, 2022, at Navy–Marine Corps Memorial Stadium in Annapolis, Maryland. It determined a national champion in NCAA Division III for the 2022 season. The game began at 7:00 p.m. EST, and aired on ESPNU. The game featured the two finalists of the 32-team single elimination playoff bracket, North Central and Mount Union; North Central won 28–21 to claim their second national championship.

== Teams ==
The participants of the 2022 NCAA Division III Football Championship Game were the finalists of the 2022 Division III Playoffs, a 32-team single elimination brackets tournament which began on November 19. The winners of each of the four 8-team regions qualified for the national semifinals.

=== National semifinals ===
Semifinals; December 10; Hosted by higher seeded team
Wartburg	31
Mount Union	34
North Central	49
Mary Hardin–Baylor	14

National Championship; December 16; Navy–Marine Corps Memorial Stadium, Annapolis, MD
Mount Union	21
North Central	28

== Game summary ==
2022 Stagg Bowl

Quarter	1	2	3	4	Total
Mount Union	0	0	0	21	21
North Central	7	7	0	14	28

at Navy–Marine Corps Memorial Stadium • Annapolis, Maryland

- Date: Friday, December 16, 2022
- Game time: 7:00 p.m. EST
- Game weather: Clear • Temperature: 42 °F (6 °C) • Wind: W 4 mph
- Game attendance: 3,231
- Referee: David Hergert
- TV: ESPNU

Scoring summary

Quarter	Time	Drive			Team	Scoring information	Score	
Quarter	Time	Plays	Yards	TOP	Team	Scoring information	Mount Union	North Central
1	11:32	6	78	3:24	North Central	Ethan Greenfield 34-yard touchdown reception from Luke Lehnen, Tanner Rains kick good	0	7
2	6:18	1	94	0:14	North Central	Deangelo Hardy 94-yard touchdown reception from Luke Lehnen, Tanner Rains kick good	0	14
4	14:56	10	87	6:09	North Central	Ethan Greenfield 4-yard touchdown run, Tanner Rains kick good	0	21
4	9:19	11	69	5:33	Mount Union	Braxton Plunk 9-yard touchdown run, Thomas Piccirillo kick good	7	21
4	3:34	9	50	4:02	Mount Union	Wayne Ruby Jr. 3-yard touchdown reception from Braxton Plunk, Thomas Piccirillo kick good	14	21
4	1:24	6	47	2:10	North Central	Deangelo Hardy 3-yard touchdown reception from Luke Lehnen, Tanner Rains kick good	14	28
4	0:30	5	60	0:45	Mount Union	Edwin Reed 4-yard touchdown reception from Braxton Plunk, Thomas Piccirillo kick good	21	28
"TOP" = time of possession. For other American football terms, see Glossary of American football.							21	28

== Statistics ==
Team statistical comparison
Statistic	Mount Union	North Central
First downs	20	11
First downs rushing	8	8
First downs passing	9	3
First downs penalty	3	0
Third down efficiency	6–15	3–10
Fourth down efficiency	2–4	2–3
Total plays–net yards	72–294	49–374
Rushing attempts–net yards	35–60	39–233
Yards per rush	1.7	6.0
Yards passing	234	141
Pass completions–attempts	26–37	4–10
Interceptions thrown	0	0
Punt returns–total yards	0–0	2–32
Kickoff returns–total yards	5–70	2–25
Punts–average yardage	5–178	3–94
Fumbles–lost	0–0	0–0
Penalties–yards	4–30	6–60
Time of possession	33:50	26:10

Mount Union statistics
Purple Raiders passing
	C–A	Yds	TD–INT
Braxton Plunk	26–36	234	2–0
TEAM	0–1	0	0–0
Purple Raiders rushing
	Car	Yds	TD
Tyler Echeverry	12	38	0
Braxton Plunk	10	16	1
KJ Redmon	8	15	0
Lance Mitchell	4	3	0
TEAM	1	−12	0
Purple Raiders receiving
	Rec	Yds	TD
Wayne Ruby Jr.	9	109	1
Jaden Manley	4	41	0
KJ Redmon	4	35	0
Chase Lawson	4	23	0
Tyler Echeverry	4	22	0
Edwin Reed	1	4	1

North Central statistics
Cardinals passing
	C–A	Yds	TD–INT
Luke Lehnen	4–10	141	3–0
Cardinals rushing
	Car	Yds	TD
Ethan Greenfield	25	119	1
Luke Lehnen	10	98	0
Terrence Hill	3	18	0
TEAM	1	−2	0
Cardinals receiving
	Rec	Yds	TD
Deangelo Hardy	3	107	2
Ethan Greenfield	1	34	1
