= North Central Cardinals football =

Football team of North Central College

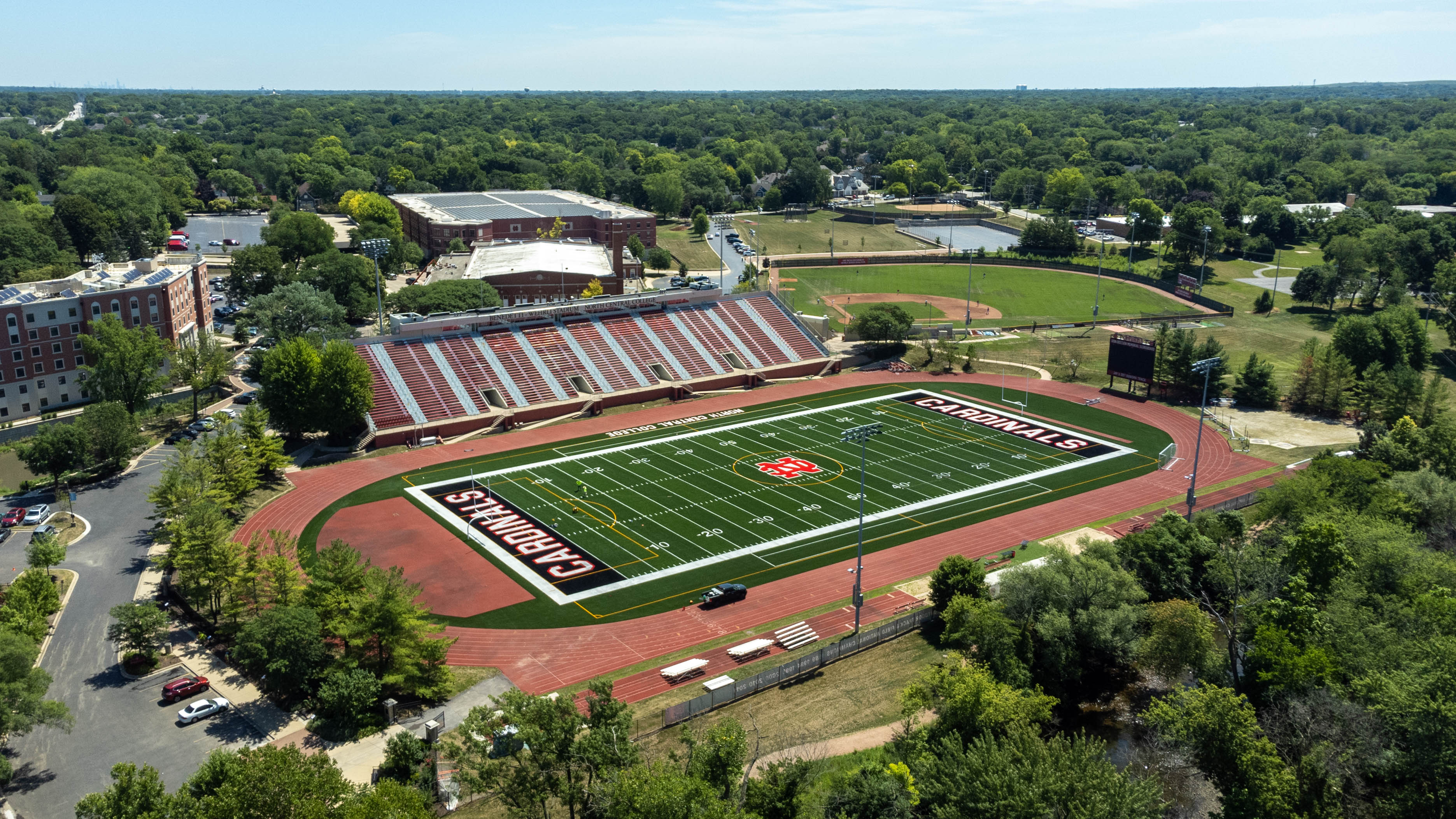
- First season: 1897; 129 years ago
- Head coach: Brad Spencer; 4th season, 62–3 (.954)
- Location: Naperville, Illinois
- Stadium: Benedetti–Wehrli Stadium (capacity: 5,889)
- NCAA division: Division III
- Conference: CCIW
- Colors: Cardinal and black
- All-time record: 579–435–36 (.569)

NCAA Division III championships
- 2019, 2022, 2024
- Mascot: Cardinal
- Website: northcentralcardinals.com

The North Central Cardinals football team represents North Central College, located in Naperville, Illinois, in NCAA Division III college football. The Cardinals, who began playing football in 1897, compete as members of the College Conference of Illinois and Wisconsin (CCIW).

North Central's home games are played at Benedetti–Wehrli Stadium.

== Championships ==
=== National championships ===
Year	Association	Division	Head coach	Record	Opponent	Result
2019	NCAA (3)	Division III (3)	Jeff Thorne	14–1 (8–1 CCIW)	Wisconsin–Whitewater	W, 41–14
2022	NCAA (3)	Division III (3)	Brad Spencer	15–0 (9–0 CCIW)	Mount Union	W, 28–21
2024	NCAA (3)	Division III (3)	Brad Spencer	15–0 (9–0 CCIW)	Mount Union	W, 41–25
