= Drew Nystrom =

American football coach (born 1985)

Biographical details
- Born: March 7, 1985 (age 41); Crystal Lake, Illinois, U.S.
- Education: Bowling Green State University (2007); University of Delaware (2011)

Playing career
- 2003–2007: Bowling Green
- Position: Offensive tackle

Coaching career (HC unless noted)
- 2008: Wabash (intern)
- 2009: Delaware (GA)
- 2010: Memphis (GA)
- 2011–2012: Dubuque (OL)
- 2013: Illinois (GA)
- 2014–2017: Dubuque (OC)
- 2018: Dubuque (AHC/OC)
- 2019: John Carroll (OL)
- 2020–2021: John Carroll (OC/OL)
- 2022: John Carroll (interim HC)

Head coaching record
- Overall: 8–2

Accomplishments and honors

Awards
- OAC co-Coach of the Year (2022)

Drew James Nystrom (born March 7, 1985) is an American former college football coach. He was the interim head football coach for John Carroll University in 2022. He also coached for Wabash, Delaware, Memphis, Dubuque, and Illinois. He played college football for Bowling Green as an offensive tackle.

== Head coaching record ==
Year	Team	Overall	Conference	Standing	Bowl/playoffs
John Carroll Blue Streaks (Ohio Athletic Conference) (2022)
2022	John Carroll	8–2	8–1		
John Carroll:		8–2	8–1		
Total:		8–2			
