= Doug Mandigo =

American football coach (born 1960)

Current position
- Title: Head coach
- Team: Middlebury
- Conference: NESCAC
- Record: 23–13

Biographical details
- Born: February 24, 1960 (age 66)
- Education: Middlebury College (1996); Boston College (2001)

Playing career

Football
- 1992–1995: Middlebury

Men's hockey
- 1992–1995: Middlebury

Baseball
- 1992–1995: Middlebury

Coaching career (HC unless noted)

Football
- 1997: St. Anselm (DC/DB)
- 1998–1999: Boston College (GA)
- 2000–2004: Middlebury (DC/DB)
- 2005: Piedmont HS (CA)
- 2006–2009: Wesleyan (DC)
- 2010: Hartford Colonials (S)
- 2011–2021: Middlebury (DC)
- 2022: Middlebury (AHC/DC)
- 2023–present: Middlebury

Women's hockey
- 1996–1997: Middlebury (assistant)
- 2009–2010: Wesleyan (assistant)

Baseball
- 1996–1997: Middlebury (assistant)
- 2005: Ohlone CC (assistant)
- 2009: Wesleyan (assistant)

Softball
- 2012–2018: Middlebury (assistant)

Head coaching record
- Overall: 19–8 (college); 6–4–1 (high school)

Accomplishments and honors

Championships
- 1 NESCAC (2023)

Doug Mandigo (born March 24, 1960) is an American football coach. He is the head football coach for Middlebury College, a position he has held since 2023. He was named the head football coach following the retirement of Bob Ritter after serving as the defensive coordinator and linebacker's coach for 11 seasons.

Mandigo began his coaching career at Middlebury following his graduation in 1996, serving as a three-sport assistant coach. He had brief stints at high schools, colleges, and the United Football League (UFL) before returning to Middlebury in 2011 as the defensive coordinator. Mandigo has been a part of three NESCAC Championship teams and coached a pair of NESCAC Defensive Player of the Year honorees.

== Head coaching record ==
=== College ===
Year	Team	Overall	Conference	Standing	Bowl/playoffs
Middlebury Panthers (New England Small College Athletic Conference) (2023–present)
2023	Middlebury	8–1	8–1	T–1st	
2024	Middlebury	6–3	6–3	4th	
2025	Middlebury	5–4	5–4	T–4th	
2026	Middlebury	4–5	4–5		
Middlebury:		23–13	23–13		
Total:		23-13			
National championship Conference title Conference division title or championship game berth

=== High school ===
Year	Team	Overall	Conference	Standing	Bowl/playoffs
Piedmont Highlanders () (2005)
2005	Piedmont	6–4–1	4–1	1st	
Piedmont:		6–4–1	4–1		
Total:		6–4–1			
National championship Conference title Conference division title or championship game berth
