= Vic Clark =

American football coach

Biographical details
- Education: Indiana State (1971); Louisville (1976)

Coaching career (HC unless noted)
- 1977–1979: Grayson County HS (KY)
- 1979: Campbellsville HS (KY)
- 1980–1982: Pekin HS (IL)
- 1984: Kentucky Wesleyan (AC)
- 1985–1987: Montana (OL)
- 1988–1989: Morehead State (OC)
- 1990–1998: Thomas More
- 2000–2002: Rockford

Head coaching record
- Overall: 71–48
- Tournaments: 0–1 (NCAA D-III playoffs)

Accomplishments and honors

Championships
- 5 AMC (1991–1995)

Vic Clark is a retired American football coach. He served as the head football coach at Thomas More College in Crestview Hills, Kentucky from 1990 to 1998 and at Rockford University in Rockford, Illinois from 2000 to 2002, compiling a career college football record of 71–48.

== Head coaching record ==
Year	Team	Overall	Conference	Standing	Bowl/playoffs
Thomas More Saints (NCAA Division III independent) (1990)
1990	Thomas More	3–6			
Thomas More Saints (Association of Mideast Colleges) (1991–1995)
1991	Thomas More	10–0	3–0	1st	
1992	Thomas More	9–2	3–0	1st	L NCAA Division III First Round
1993	Thomas More	8–2	3–0	1st	
1994	Thomas More	7–3	2–1	T–1st	
1995	Thomas More	10–0	3–0	1st	
Thomas More Saints (NCAA Division III independent) (1996–1998)
1996	Thomas More	6–4			
1997	Thomas More	5–5			
1998	Thomas More	3–7			
Thomas More:		61–29	14–1		
Rockford Regents (NCAA Division III independent) (2000–2001)
2000	Rockford	1–9			
2001	Rockford	5–4			
Rockford Regents (Upper Midwest Athletic Conference) (2002)
2002	Rockford	4–6	1–3	4th (South)	
Rockford:		10–19	1–3		
Total:		71–48			
National championship Conference title Conference division title or championship game berth
