= 2022 NCAA Division III football season =

American college football season

- Total No. of teams: 241
- Preseason AP No. 1: Mary Hardin–Baylor
- Regular season: September 3 – November 12, 2022
- Playoffs: November 19 – December 16, 2022
- National championship: Navy–Marine Corps Memorial Stadium; Annapolis, MD; December 16, 2022
- Champion: North Central (IL)
- Gagliardi Trophy: Ethan Greenfield (RB), North Central (IL)

The 2022 NCAA Division III football season was the component of the 2022 college football season organized by the NCAA at the Division III level in the United States. The regular season began on September 3 and ended on November 12. This was the 49th season that the NCAA has sponsored a Division III championship.

Mary Hardin–Baylor, the defending national champions, were the top-ranked team to begin the season.

The season's playoffs were played between November 19 and December 16, culminating in the national championship—also known as the Stagg Bowl—at the Navy–Marine Corps Memorial Stadium in Annapolis, Maryland.

== Conference changes and new programs ==
=== Membership changes ===
Team	Former conference	New conference
Allegheny	NCAC	Presidents'
Averett	USA South	ODAC
Belhaven	ASC	USA South
Eastern	New program	Independent
Hilbert	New program	Independent

In addition to the above, the USA South amicably split into two conferences at the end of the 2021–22 school year. In addition to Averett, which left for the Old Dominion Athletic Conference, 10 of the previous 19 full members remained in the USA South, and eight left to form the new Collegiate Conference of the South (CCS). Belhaven, which had previously been announced as a new USA South all-sports member for 2021–22, instead joined CCS. Since CCS does not sponsor football, the separation agreement called for all football-sponsoring CCS members to become USA South affiliates. This meant the only changes to USA South football were the arrival of Belhaven and departure of Averett.

== Conference standings ==
2022 American Rivers Conference football standings
	Conf.			Overall
Team	W		L	W		L
No. 4 Wartburg $^	8	–	0	13	–	1
Coe	6	–	2	7	–	3
Dubuque	6	–	2	6	–	4
Central (IA)	5	–	3	7	–	3
Loras	5	–	3	5	–	5
Buena Vista	3	–	5	4	–	6
Luther	2	–	6	2	–	8
Simpson (IA)	1	–	7	1	–	9
Nebraska Wesleyan	0	–	8	1	–	9
$ – Conference champion; ^ – NCAA Division III playoff participant; Rankings from AFCA Poll

2022 American Southwest Conference football standings
	Conf.			Overall
Team	W		L	W		L
No. 3 Mary Hardin–Baylor $^	8	–	0	12	–	2
No. 12 Hardin–Simmons ^	7	–	1	9	–	2
Howard Payne	6	–	2	7	–	3
East Texas Baptist	4	–	4	5	–	5
Sul Ross	4	–	4	4	–	6
Texas Lutheran	3	–	5	4	–	6
Southwestern (TX)	2	–	6	3	–	7
Austin	1	–	7	1	–	9
McMurry	1	–	7	1	–	9
$ – Conference champion; ^ – NCAA Division III playoff participant; Rankings from AFCA Poll

2022 Centennial Conference football standings
	Conf.			Overall
Team	W		L	W		L
No. 20 Susquehanna $^	9	–	0	10	–	1
No. 21 Johns Hopkins	8	–	1	10	–	1
Ursinus	7	–	2	9	–	2
Muhlenberg	6	–	3	7	–	4
Franklin & Marshall	5	–	4	6	–	4
Dickinson	3	–	6	3	–	7
Moravian	3	–	6	3	–	7
McDaniel	3	–	6	3	–	7
Gettysburg	1	–	8	1	–	9
Juniata	0	–	9	0	–	10
$ – Conference champion; ^ – NCAA Division III playoff participant; Rankings from AFCA Poll

2022 College Conference of Illinois and Wisconsin football standings
	Conf.			Overall
Team	W		L	W		L
No. 1 North Central (IL) $^	9	–	0	15	–	0
No. 17 Wheaton (IL) ^	8	–	1	8	–	3
Washington University	7	–	2	8	–	3
Carroll (WI)	5	–	4	6	–	4
Illinois Wesleyan	5	–	4	6	–	4
Augustana (IL)	4	–	5	5	–	5
Millikin	3	–	6	4	–	6
Carthage	3	–	6	3	–	7
North Park	1	–	8	1	–	9
Elmhurst	0	–	9	0	–	10
$ – Conference champion; ^ – NCAA Division III playoff participant; Rankings from AFCA Poll

2022 Commonwealth Coast Conference football standings
	Conf.			Overall
Team	W		L	W		L
No. 25 Endicott $^	6	–	0	10	–	1
Husson	4	–	2	5	–	6
Salve Regina	3	–	3	6	–	4
New England	3	–	3	5	–	5
Western New England	3	–	3	4	–	6
Nichols	1	–	5	4	–	6
Curry	1	–	5	3	–	7
$ – Conference champion; ^ – NCAA Division III playoff participant; Rankings from AFCA Poll

2022 Eastern Collegiate Football Conference standings
	Conf.			Overall
Team	W		L	W		L
Gallaudet $^	5	–	1	7	–	3
Castleton	4	–	2	5	–	5
Anna Maria	3	–	3	5	–	4
Alfred State	3	–	3	5	–	5
Keystone	3	–	3	3	–	7
SUNY Maritime	2	–	4	3	–	7
Dean	1	–	5	1	–	9
$ – Conference champion; ^ – NCAA Division III playoff participant

2022 Empire 8 Athletic Conference football standings
	Conf.			Overall
Team	W		L	W		L
No. 19 Cortland $^	6	–	0	9	–	2
No. 22 Utica ^	5	–	1	10	–	2
Brockport	4	–	2	7	–	3
SUNY Morrisville	3	–	3	7	–	4
St. John Fisher	2	–	4	4	–	6
Alfred	1	–	5	2	–	8
Hartwick	0	–	6	2	–	8
$ – Conference champion; ^ – NCAA Division III playoff participant; Rankings from AFCA Poll

2022 Heartland Collegiate Athletic Conference football standings
	Conf.			Overall
Team	W		L	W		L
No. 24 Mount St. Joseph $^	7	–	0	10	–	1
Rose–Hulman	6	–	1	6	–	4
Hanover	5	–	2	5	–	5
Franklin (IN)	4	–	3	4	–	6
Defiance	3	–	4	3	–	7
Bluffton	2	–	5	2	–	8
Anderson (IN)	1	–	6	1	–	9
Manchester	0	–	7	1	–	9
$ – Conference champion; ^ – NCAA Division III playoff participant; Rankings from AFCA Poll

2022 Liberty League football standings
	Conf.			Overall
Team	W		L	W		L
No. 10 Ithaca $^	6	–	0	12	–	1
RPI	5	–	1	8	–	3
Union (NY)	4	–	2	7	–	4
Hobart	3	–	3	6	–	4
St. Lawrence	2	–	4	4	–	6
Rochester (NY)	1	–	5	3	–	7
Buffalo State	0	–	6	0	–	10
$ – Conference champion; ^ – NCAA Division III playoff participant; Rankings from AFCA Poll

2022 Massachusetts State Collegiate Athletic Conference football standings
	Conf.			Overall
Team	W		L	W		L
UMass Dartmouth $^	8	–	0	9	–	2
Plymouth State	6	–	2	9	–	2
Western Connecticut	6	–	2	7	–	3
Bridgewater State	6	–	2	7	–	4
Framingham State	4	–	4	5	–	5
Massachusetts Maritime	3	–	5	3	–	7
Westfield State	2	–	6	2	–	8
Worcester State	1	–	7	1	–	9
Fitchburg State	0	–	8	1	–	9
$ – Conference champion; ^ – NCAA Division III playoff participant

2022 Michigan Intercollegiate Athletic Association football standings
	Conf.			Overall
Team	W		L	W		L
No. 18 Alma $^	6	–	0	11	–	1
Albion	5	–	1	9	–	1
Trine	3	–	3	7	–	3
Hope	3	–	3	6	–	4
Adrian	3	–	3	6	–	4
Olivet	1	–	5	5	–	5
Kalamazoo	0	–	6	3	–	7
$ – Conference champion; ^ – NCAA Division III playoff participant; Rankings from AFCA Poll

2022 Middle Atlantic Conference football standings
	Conf.			Overall
Team	W		L	W		L
No. 7 Delaware Valley $^	8	–	0	12	–	1
King's (PA)	7	–	1	8	–	3
Stevenson	6	–	2	8	–	3
Wilkes	5	–	3	7	–	3
Lebanon Valley	5	–	3	5	–	6
FDU–Florham	4	–	4	6	–	5
Lycoming	3	–	5	4	–	6
Alvernia	2	–	6	3	–	7
Misericordia	2	–	6	3	–	7
Widener	2	–	6	3	–	7
Albright	0	–	8	0	–	10
$ – Conference champion; ^ – NCAA Division III playoff participant; Rankings from AFCA Poll

2022 Midwest Conference football standings
	Conf.			Overall
Team	W		L	W		L
Ripon +	8	–	1	9	–	1
Lake Forest +^	8	–	1	9	–	2
Monmouth (IL) +	8	–	1	9	–	2
Chicago	6	–	3	7	–	3
Illinois College	4	–	4	5	–	4
Knox	4	–	5	5	–	5
Cornell (IA)	3	–	6	3	–	7
Grinnell	2	–	6	2	–	7
Beloit	1	–	8	1	–	9
Lawrence	0	–	9	0	–	10
+ – Conference co-champions; ^ – NCAA Division III playoff participant

2022 Minnesota Intercollegiate Athletic Conference football standings
	Div			Conf.			Overall
Team	W		L	W		L	W		L
Northwoods Division
No. 6 Saint John's (MN) xy$^	4	–	0	7	–	1	10	–	2
Gustavus Adolphus	3	–	1	6	–	2	7	–	3
Carleton	2	–	2	5	–	3	7	–	3
St. Olaf	1	–	3	3	–	5	4	–	6
St. Scholastica	0	–	4	2	–	6	3	–	7
Skyline Division
No. 8 Bethel (MN) xy^	4	–	0	7	–	1	10	–	3
Augsburg	3	–	1	4	–	4	6	–	4
Concordia–Moorhead	2	–	2	3	–	5	5	–	5
Macalester	1	–	3	3	–	5	5	–	5
Hamline	0	–	4	0	–	8	2	–	8
Championship: Saint John's (MN) 28, Bethel (MN) 10
$ – Conference champion; x – Division champion/co-champions; y – Championship game participant; ^ – NCAA Division III playoff participant; Rankings from AFCA Poll

2022 New England Small College Athletic Conference football standings
	Conf.			Overall
Team	W		L	W		L
Trinity (CT) $	9	–	0	9	–	0
Middlebury	7	–	2	7	–	2
Tufts	6	–	3	6	–	3
Wesleyan	6	–	3	6	–	3
Colby	4	–	5	4	–	5
Bates	3	–	6	3	–	6
Bowdoin	3	–	6	3	–	6
Williams	3	–	6	3	–	6
Hamilton	2	–	7	2	–	7
Amherst	2	–	7	2	–	7
$ – Conference champion

2022 New England Women's and Men's Athletic Conference football standings
	Conf.			Overall
Team	W		L	W		L
Springfield $^	6	–	0	9	–	3
Catholic University	5	–	1	6	–	5
Merchant Marine	4	–	2	6	–	3
WPI	2	–	4	4	–	6
Norwich	2	–	4	3	–	7
MIT	1	–	5	3	–	6
Coast Guard	1	–	5	3	–	7
$ – Conference champion; ^ – NCAA Division III playoff participant

2022 New Jersey Athletic Conference football standings
	Conf.			Overall
Team	W		L	W		L
Salisbury $^	6	–	0	9	–	2
Christopher Newport	5	–	1	7	–	3
Rowan	4	–	2	7	–	3
William Paterson	2	–	4	5	–	5
TCNJ	2	–	4	3	–	6
Kean	2	–	4	3	–	7
Montclair State	0	–	6	2	–	8
$ – Conference champion; ^ – NCAA Division III playoff participant

2022 North Coast Athletic Conference football standings
	Conf.			Overall
Team	W		L	W		L
DePauw $^	7	–	1	9	–	2
Denison	6	–	2	8	–	2
Wabash	6	–	2	7	–	3
Ohio Wesleyan	6	–	2	6	–	4
Wooster	4	–	4	6	–	4
Wittenberg	4	–	4	5	–	5
Kenyon	2	–	6	3	–	7
Hiram	1	–	7	2	–	8
Oberlin	0	–	8	0	–	10
$ – Conference champion; ^ – NCAA Division III playoff participant

2022 Northern Athletics Collegiate Conference football standings
	Conf.			Overall
Team	W		L	W		L
No. 15 Aurora $^	8	–	0	11	–	2
Concordia (WI)	6	–	2	8	–	3
St. Norbert	6	–	2	7	–	3
Benedictine (IL)	4	–	3	7	–	3
Wisconsin Lutheran	4	–	3	4	–	6
Lakeland	3	–	5	3	–	7
Concordia (IL)	2	–	6	3	–	7
Eureka	2	–	6	2	–	8
Rockford	0	–	8	1	–	9
$ – Conference champion; ^ – NCAA Division III playoff participant; Rankings from AFCA Poll

2022 Northwest Conference football standings
	Conf.			Overall
Team	W		L	W		L
No. 9 Linfield $^	7	–	0	10	–	1
George Fox	5	–	2	8	–	2
Pacific Lutheran	5	–	2	6	–	4
Whitworth	4	–	3	6	–	4
Pacific (OR)	4	–	3	5	–	4
Lewis & Clark	2	–	5	4	–	5
Puget Sound	1	–	6	1	–	8
Willamette	0	–	7	2	–	8
$ – Conference champion; ^ – NCAA Division III playoff participant; Rankings from AFCA Poll

2022 Ohio Athletic Conference football standings
	Conf.			Overall
Team	W		L	W		L
No. 2 Mount Union $^	9	–	0	14	–	1
John Carroll	8	–	1	8	–	2
Baldwin Wallace	7	–	2	7	–	3
Heidelberg	6	–	3	7	–	3
Marietta	5	–	4	6	–	4
Muskingum	4	–	5	5	–	5
Ohio Northern	3	–	6	3	–	7
Wilmington (OH)	2	–	7	3	–	7
Otterbein	1	–	8	2	–	8
Capital	0	–	9	0	–	10
$ – Conference champion; ^ – NCAA Division III playoff participant; Rankings from d3football.com

2022 Old Dominion Athletic Conference football standings
	Conf.			Overall
Team	W		L	W		L
No. 13 Randolph–Macon $^	7	–	0	11	–	1
Bridgewater	6	–	1	9	–	2
Shenandoah	5	–	2	8	–	2
Hampden–Sydney	4	–	3	5	–	5
Washington & Lee	3	–	4	5	–	5
Averett	1	–	6	3	–	7
Guilford	1	–	6	2	–	8
Ferrum	1	–	6	1	–	9
$ – Conference champion; ^ – NCAA Division III playoff participant; Rankings from AFCA Poll

2022 Presidents' Athletic Conference football standings
	Conf.			Overall
Team	W		L	W		L
No. 14 Carnegie Mellon $^	8	–	0	11	–	1
Washington & Jefferson	6	–	2	8	–	2
Westminster (PA)	6	–	2	7	–	3
Grove City	5	–	3	8	–	3
Case Western Reserve	5	–	3	6	–	4
Saint Vincent	5	–	3	5	–	5
Waynesburg	3	–	5	4	–	6
Geneva	3	–	5	3	–	7
Allegheny	2	–	6	3	–	7
Thiel	1	–	7	1	–	9
Bethany (WV)	0	–	8	1	–	9
$ – Conference champion; ^ – NCAA Division III playoff participant; Rankings from AFCA Poll

2022 Southern Athletic Association football standings
	Conf.			Overall
Team	W		L	W		L
No. 5 Trinity (TX) $^	7	–	0	11	–	1
Birmingham–Southern	5	–	2	7	–	3
Berry	5	–	2	7	–	3
Centre	4	–	3	6	–	4
Rhodes	3	–	4	5	–	5
Millsaps	2	–	5	3	–	7
Hendrix	2	–	5	3	–	7
Sewanee	0	–	7	2	–	8
$ – Conference champion; ^ – NCAA Division III playoff participant; Rankings from AFCA Poll

2022 Southern California Intercollegiate Athletic Conference football standings
	Conf.			Overall
Team	W		L	W		L
Claremont-Mudd-Scripps +	5	–	1	7	–	2
Pomona-Pitzer +^	5	–	1	8	–	3
Chapman	4	–	2	7	–	3
Redlands	4	–	2	4	–	6
La Verne	2	–	5	2	–	7
Cal Lutheran	1	–	5	3	–	7
Whittier	0	–	6	0	–	9
+ – Conference co-champions; ^ – NCAA Division III playoff participant

2022 Upper Midwest Athletic Conference football standings
	Conf.			Overall
Team	W		L	W		L
Northwestern (MN) $^	6	–	0	6	–	5
Greenville	5	–	1	7	–	3
Minnesota–Morris	4	–	2	5	–	5
Crown	3	–	3	3	–	7
Martin Luther	2	–	4	2	–	8
Westminster (MO)	1	–	5	1	–	9
Finlandia	0	–	6	0	–	10
$ – Conference champion; ^ – NCAA Division III playoff participant

2022 USA South Athletic Conference football standings
	Conf.			Overall
Team	W		L	W		L
No. 23 Huntingdon $^	7	–	0	9	–	2
Belhaven	6	–	2	8	–	2
Brevard	5	–	2	5	–	5
Maryville (TN)	5	–	2	5	–	5
Methodist	4	–	3	5	–	5
North Carolina Wesleyan	3	–	4	3	–	7
Greensboro	1	–	6	1	–	9
Southern Virginia	1	–	6	1	–	9
LaGrange	0	–	7	1	–	8
$ – Conference champion; ^ – NCAA Division III playoff participant; Rankings from AFCA Poll

2022 Wisconsin Intercollegiate Athletic Conference football standings
	Conf.			Overall
Team	W		L	W		L
No. 11 Wisconsin–La Crosse +^	6	–	1	9	–	2
No. 16 Wisconsin–Whitewater +^	6	–	1	8	–	3
Wisconsin–River Falls	4	–	3	7	–	4
Wisconsin–Oshkosh	4	–	3	6	–	4
Wisconsin–Platteville	4	–	3	5	–	5
Wisconsin–Stout	3	–	4	5	–	5
Wisconsin–Eau Claire	1	–	6	2	–	8
Wisconsin–Stevens Point	0	–	7	1	–	9
+ – Conference co-champions; ^ – NCAA Division III playoff participant; Rankings from AFCA Poll

2022 NCAA Division III independents football records
	Conf.			Overall
Team	W		L	W		L
Hilbert		–		0	–	7
Eastern*		–		1	–	2
* – Eastern was accepted as a Division III football program for the 2022 season, but did not play against any varsity level teams

== Postseason ==
=== Teams ===
==== Automatic bids (27) ====
Automatic bids
Conference	School	Record	Appearance	Last
American Rivers	Wartburg	10–0	15th	2019
American Southwest	Mary Hardin–Baylor	9–1	18th	2021
Centennial	Susquehanna	10–0	4th	2009
CCIW	North Central (IL)	10–0	14th	2021
Commonwealth Coast	Endicott	10–0	4th	2021
ECFC	Gallaudet	7–2	2nd	2013
Empire 8	Cortland	9–1	11th	2021
HCAC	Mount St. Joseph	10–0	6th	2009
Liberty	Ithaca	10–0	20th	2014
MASCAC	UMass Dartmouth	9–1	2nd	2002
Michigan	Alma	10–0	4th	2004
Middle Atlantic	Delaware Valley	10–0	11th	2021
Midwest	Lake Forest	9–1	3rd	2021
Minnesota	Saint John's (MN)	9–1	28th	2021
NEWMAC	Springfield	8–2	8th	2021
New Jersey	Salisbury	9–1	13th	2021
North Coast	DePauw	9–1	4th	2021
NACC	Aurora	9–1	7th	2021
Northwest	Linfield	9–0	17th	2021
Ohio	Mount Union	10–0	33rd	2021
Old Dominion	Randolph–Macon	10–0	5th	2018
Presidents'	Carnegie Mellon	10–0	8th	2021
SAA	Trinity (TX)	10–0	14th	2021
SCIAC	Pomona-Pitzer	8–2	1st	—
Upper Midwest	Northwestern (MN)	6–4	2nd	2016
USA South	Huntingdon	9–1	7th	2021
Wisconsin	Wisconsin–Whitewater	8–2	19th	2021

==== At-large bids (5) ====
At-large bids
School	Conference	Record	Appearance	Last
Wisconsin–La Crosse	Wisconsin	8–2	13th	2021
Wheaton (IL)	CCIW	8–2	13th	2021
Utica	Empire 8	9–1	1st	—
Hardin–Simmons	American Southwest	9–1	11th	2018
Bethel (MN)	Minnesota	8–2	11th	2021

=== Bracket ===
First round November 19
*	Mount Union	51
Salisbury	0
*	Susquehanna	10
Utica	17
*	Randolph–Macon	35
Cortland	28
*	Delaware Valley	59
Gallaudet	0
*	Saint John's (MN)	49
Northwestern (MN)	0
*	Wartburg	14
Wisconsin–La Crosse	6
*	Alma	41
Mount St. Joseph	21
*	Wisconsin–Whitewater	28
Aurora	33
*	Trinity (TX)	14
Hardin–Simmons	7
*	Mary Hardin–Baylor	54
Huntingdon	0
*	Wheaton (IL)	32
Bethel (MN)	34
*	Linfield	51
Pomona-Pitzer	24
*	North Central (IL)	50
Lake Forest	0
*	Carnegie Mellon	45
DePauw	14
*	Endicott	14
Springfield	17
*	Ithaca	63
UMass Dartmouth	20

Second round November 26
*	Mount Union	45
Utica	7
Randolph–Macon	32
*	Delaware Valley	39
*	Saint John's (MN)	20
Wartburg	23
*	Alma	26
Aurora	48
*	Trinity (TX)	17
Mary Hardin–Baylor	24
Bethel (MN)	30
*	Linfield	13
*	North Central (IL)	28
Carnegie Mellon	7
Springfield	20
*	Ithaca	31

Quarterfinals; December 3
Mount Union	22
*	Delaware Valley	6
*	Wartburg	45
Aurora	17
*	Mary Hardin–Baylor	41
Bethel (MN)	28
*	North Central (IL)	48
Ithaca	7

Semifinals; December 10
*	Mount Union	34
Wartburg	31
Mary Hardin–Baylor	14
*	North Central (IL)	49

Championship; Stagg Bowl; December 16; Annapolis, Maryland
Mount Union	21
North Central (IL)	28

* - Host team

== Coaching changes ==
=== Preseason and in-season ===
This is restricted to coaching changes that took place on or after May 1, 2022, and will include any changes announced after a team's last regularly scheduled games but before its playoff games.

School	Outgoing coach	Date	Reason	Replacement	Previous position
Defiance	Earnest Wilson	May 23, 2022	Resigned	Bill Nickell	Arkansas–Pine Bluff offensive line coach (2021)
Fitchburg State	Scott Sperone	October 11, 2022	Resigned	Mark Sullivan	Fitchburg State defensive coordinator (2019–2022)
Anderson (IN)	Steve Rock	October 18, 2022	Fired	Jeremy Lochner	Anderson (IN) defensive coordinator (2019–2022)

=== End of season ===
This list includes coaching changes announced during the season that did not take effect until the end of the season.

School	Outgoing coach	Date	Reason	Replacement	Previous position
Ripon	Ron Ernst	August 10, 2022 (effective at season's end)	Retired	Jake Marshall	Ripon associate head coach and offensive coordinator (2017–2022)
Elmhurst	Jeff McDonald	November 13, 2022	Resigned	Mike Murray	Roosevelt associate head coach and defensive coordinator (2018–2022)
East Texas Baptist	Brian Mayper	November 14, 2022	Retired	Calvin Ruzicka	East Texas Baptist assistant head coach and defensive coordinator (2018–2022)
Simpson	Matt Jeter	November 14, 2022	Resigned	Reed Hoskins	Illinois Wesleyan offensive coordinator and quarterbacks coach (2016–2022)
Southern Virginia	Edwin Mulitalo	November 14, 2022	Fired	Joe DuPaix	Navy slot backs coach (2018–2022)
Austin	Loren Dawson	November 15, 2022	Resigned	Tony Joe White	Birmingham–Southern head coach (2017–2022)
Buena Vista	Grant Mollring	November 15, 2022	Fired	Austin Dickinson	Wisconsin–Eau Claire defensive coordinator and linebackers coach (2020–2022)
Moravian	Paul Pukszyn	November 17, 2022	Resigned	Jeff Long Jr.	John Carroll associate head coach, defensive coordinator, and defensive line coach (2020–2022)
Otterbein	Tim Doup	November 17, 2022	Resigned	Tommy Zagorski	Gilmour Academy (OH) head coach (2022)
Montclair State	Rick Giancola	November 21, 2022	Retired	Mike Palazzo	Montclair State defensive coordinator (2022)
Wisconsin–Whitewater	Kevin Bullis	November 22, 2022	Retired	Jace Rindahl	Wisconsin–Whitewater assistant head coach and defensive coordinator (2023)
Middlebury	Bob Ritter	December 1, 2022	Resigned	Doug Mandigo	Middlebury assistant head coach and defensive coordinator (2022)
Wisconsin–Eau Claire	Wesley Beschorner	December 14, 2022	Resigned	Rob Erickson	South Dakota State special teams coordinator and cornerbacks coach (2020–2022)
Anderson (IN)	Jeremy Lochner (interim)	December 16, 2022	Permanent replacement	Jonathan Coddington	Concordia (MI) offensive coordinator and quarterbacks coach (2020–2022)
Howard Payne	Jason Bachtel	December 17, 2023	Hired as offensive coordinator and quarterbacks coach by Houston Christian	Kevin Bachtel	Howard Payne assistant head coach and defensive coordinator (2021–2022)
Albion	Dustin Beurer	December 19, 2022	Hired as head coach by Northwood	Travis Rundle	Sewanee head coach (2017–2022)
John Carroll	Drew Nystrom (full-season interim)	December 19, 2022	Permanent replacement	Jeff Behrman	Union (NY) head coach (2016–2022)
Union (NY)	Jeff Behrman	December 19, 2022	Hired as head coach by John Carroll	Jon Poppe	Harvard special teams coordinator and defensive backs coach (2018–2022)
Birmingham–Southern	Tony Joe White	December 20, 2022	Hired as head coach by Austin	Anthony Colucci	Birmingham–Southern assistant head coach, offensive coordinator, and offensive line coach (2022)
Hilbert	Jim Kubiak	before December 23, 2022	Resigned	Ted Egger	Hocking head coach (2020–2022)
Fitchburg State	Mark Sullivan (interim)	January 10, 2023	Permanent replacement	Zach Shaw	Elmhurst co-offensive coordinator and quarterbacks coach (2022)
Manchester	Nate Jensen	January 10, 2023	Resigned	Vann Hunt	Allegheny defensive coordinator and linebackers coach (2021–2022)
Sewanee	Travis Rundle	January 17, 2023	Hired as head coach by Albion	Andy McCollum	Western Carolina defensive coordinator and inside linebackers coach (2020–2022)
Allegheny	Rich Nagy	January 21, 2023	Resigned	Braden Layer	Dayton quarterbacks coach (2022)
Oberlin	Steve Opgenorth	before January 30, 2023	Resigned	John Pont	Indiana offensive analyst (2021–2022)
UMass Dartmouth	Mark Robichaud	February 1, 2023	Retired	Josh Sylvester	UMass Dartmouth offensive coordinator and quarterbacks coach (2021–2022)
King's (PA)	Jeff Knarr	February 16, 2023	Resigned	Skyler Fultz	King's (PA) offensive coordinator and quarterbacks coach (2018–2022)
Millsaps	Isaac Carter	April 25, 2023	Hired as defensive coordinator by San Diego	Cory York (interim)	Millsaps offensive line coach (2019–2022)

== See also ==
- 2022 NCAA Division I FBS football season
- 2022 NCAA Division I FCS football season
- 2022 NCAA Division II football season
- 2022 NAIA football season
- 2022 U Sports football season
- 2022 junior college football season
