= 2021 Mary Hardin–Baylor Crusaders football team =

American college football season

2021 Mary Hardin–Baylor Crusaders football

NCAA Division III champion ASC champion

Stagg Bowl, W 57–24 vs. North Central (IL)
- Conference: American Southwest Conference

Ranking
- D3Football.com: No. 1
- Head coach: Pete Fredenburg (23rd season)
- Offensive coordinator: Stephen Lee (7th season)
- Offensive scheme: Pro-style
- Defensive coordinator: Larry Harmon (20th season)
- Base defense: 3–4
- Home stadium: Crusader Stadium

2021 American Southwest Conference football standings
	Conf.			Overall
Team	W		L	W		L
No. 1 Mary Hardin–Baylor $^	9	–	0	15	–	0
No. 10 Hardin–Simmons	8	–	1	9	–	1
Belhaven	6	–	3	7	–	3
Howard Payne	6	–	3	7	–	3
East Texas Baptist	4	–	5	5	–	5
Southwestern (TX)	4	–	5	4	–	6
Texas Lutheran	3	–	6	3	–	7
McMurry	2	–	7	2	–	7
Sul Ross	2	–	7	2	–	7
Austin	1	–	8	1	–	8
$ – Conference champion; ^ – NCAA Division III playoff participant; Rankings from AFCA poll

The 2021 Mary Hardin–Baylor Crusaders football team represented the University of Mary Hardin–Baylor as a member of the American Southwest Conference during the 2021 NCAA Division III football season. Led by 23rd-year head coach Pete Fredenburg, the Crusaders compiled an overall record of 15–0 with a mark of 9–0 in conference play, winning the ASC title.

Mary Hardin–Baylor beat Trinity (TX) in the first round, Birmingham–Southern in the second round, Linfield in the quarterfinals, and Wisconsin–Whitewater in the semifinals before playing in the 2021 Stagg Bowl where they played North Central (IL) and won 57–24 to secure the school's second-overall and first-non vacated title. Mary Hardin–Baylor played home games at Crusader Stadium in Belton, Texas.

== Preseason ==
=== ASC media poll ===
ASC media poll
Predicted finish	Team	Votes (1st place)
1	Mary Hardin–Baylor	196 (17)
2	Hardin–Simmons	179 (2)
3	East Texas Baptist	153 (1)
4	Texas Lutheran	140
5	Belhaven	115
6	Howard Payne	95
7	McMurry	69
8	Austin	62
9	Southwestern	54
10	Sul Ross	41

== Schedule ==
Date	Time	Opponent	Rank	Site	Result	Attendance
September 4	6:00 p.m.	Simpson*	No. 1	Crusader Stadium; Belton, TX	W 84–6	3,441
September 11	1:00 p.m.	East Texas Baptist	No. 1	Crusader Stadium; Belton, TX	W 34–14	5,006
September 18	7:00 p.m.	at Southwestern (TX)	No. 1	Birkelbach Stadium; Georgetown, TX	W 54–3	0
September 25	6:00 p.m.	No. 7 Hardin–Simmons^{†}	No. 2	Crusader Stadium; Belton, TX	W 34–28	7,018
October 2	1:00 p.m.	at Austin	No. 2	Apple Stadium; Sherman, TX	W 56–0	1,037
October 16	1:00 p.m.	Texas Lutheran	No. 2	Crusader Stadium; Belton, TX	W 49–3	3,024
October 23	12:00 p.m.	at Sul Ross	No. 2	Jackson Field; Alpine, TX	W 72–14	0
October 30	12:00 p.m.	Belhaven	No. 2	Crusader Stadium; Belton, TX	W 29–0	2,377
November 6	12:00 p.m.	Howard Payne	No. 2	Crusader Stadium; Belton, TX	W 59–14	2,797
November 13	1:00 p.m.	at McMurry	No. 2	Wilford Moore Stadium; Abilene, TX	W 77–3	1,750
November 20	12:00 p.m.	No. 16 Trinity (TX)*	No. 2	Crusader Stadium; Belton, TX (NCAA Division III First Round)	W 13–3	0
November 27	1:00 p.m.	No. 19 Birmingham–Southern*	No. 2	Crusader Stadium; Belton, TX (NCAA Division III Second Round)	W 42–7	1,455
December 4	12:00 p.m.	No. 7 Linfield*	No. 2	Crusader Stadium; Belton, TX (NCAA Division III Quarterfinal)	W 49–24	0
December 11	2:30 p.m.	at No. 3 Wisconsin–Whitewater*	No. 2	Forrest Perkins Stadium; Whitewater, WI (NCAA Division III Semifinal)	W 24–7	2,519
December 17	7:00 p.m.	vs. No. 1 North Central (IL)*	No. 2	Tom Benson Hall of Fame Stadium; Canton, OH (Stagg Bowl)	W 57–24	1,830
*Non-conference game; ^{†}Homecoming; Rankings from D3 Poll released prior to the game; All times are in Central time

== Rankings ==
Ranking movements Legend: ██ Increase in ranking ██ Decrease in ranking ( ) = First-place votes
	Week												
Poll	Pre	1	2	3	4	5	6	7	8	9	10	11	Final
D3Football.com	1 (10)	1 (12)	1 (13)	2 (10)	2 (8)	2 (7)	2 (7)	2 (7)	2 (7)	2 (7)	2 (7)	2 (7)	1 (25)

== Regular season ==
=== Simpson ===
Simpson Storm at No. 1 Mary Hardin–Baylor Crusaders – Game summary

Quarter	1	2	3	4	Total
Storm	0	0	6	0	6
No. 1 Crusaders	21	21	28	14	84

at Crusader Stadium, Belton, Texas

- Date: September 4
- Game time: 6:00 p.m. CDT
- Game weather: Sunny
- Game attendance: 3,441
- Referee: Kenny Kelarek
- Box score, Recap

Game information
First quarter
- MHB – Kyle King 16-yard run (Anthony Avila kick), 12:12. Crusaders 7–0. Drive: 2 plays, 20 yards, 0:38.
- MHB – Kyle King 2-yard run (Anthony Avila kick), 7:18. Crusaders 14–0. Drive: 6 plays, 53 yards, 2:43.
- MHB – Kyle King 2-yard run (Anthony Avila kick), 5:17. Crusaders 21–0. Drive: 2 plays, 2 yards, 0:11.

Second quarter

- MHB – Brandon Jordan 3-yard pass from Kyle King (Anthony Avila kick), 14:54. Crusaders 28–0. Drive: 9 plays, 58 yards, 2:50.
- MHB – Kyle King 1-yard run (Anthony Avila kick), 4:23. Crusaders 35–0. Drive: 10 plays, 78 yards, 4:50.
- MHB – Kenneth Cormier 7-yard run (Anthony Avila kick), 1:14. Crusaders 42–0. Drive: 5 plays, 44 yards, 1:43.

Third quarter

- MHB – Brandon Jordan 16-yard pass from Kyle King (Anthony Avila kick), 10:51. Crusaders 49–0. Drive: 8 plays, 77 yards, 3:24.
- MHB – Tommy Bowden 3-yard run (Anthony Avila kick), 7:12. Crusaders 56–0. Drive: 6 plays, 20 yards, 2:25.
- SIM – Reed Worth 26-yard pass from Seth Howard (kick failed), 4:16. Crusaders 56–6. Drive: 8 plays, 75 yards, 2:56.
- MHB – Tommy Bowden 19-yard run (Anthony Avila kick), 2:15. Crusaders 63–6. Drive: 6 plays, 52 yards, 1:47.
- MHB – Andrew Robinson 16-yard run (Anthony Avila kick), 0:29. Crusaders 70–6. Drive: 2 plays, 27 yards, 0:39.

Fourth quarter

- MHB – Andrew Robinson 16-yard run (Anthony Avila kick), 8:47. Crusaders 77–6. Drive: 8 plays, 69 yards, 4:26.
- MHB – Ryan Redding 63-yard run (Anthony Avila kick), 6:06. Crusaders 84–6. Drive: 3 plays, 75 yards, 0:58.

Statistics	SIM	MHB
First downs	9	27
Total yards	146	601
Rushing yards	-9	330
Passing yards	155	271
Turnovers	3	1
Time of possession	29:08	29:42

Team	Category	Player	Statistics
Simpson	Passing	Seth Howard	11/25, 155 yards, TD, 2 INT
Simpson	Rushing	Hunter Ogle	10 rushes, 19 yards
Simpson	Receiving	Reed Worth	5 receptions, 83 yards, TD
Mary Hardin–Baylor	Passing	Kyle King	14/19, 201 yards, 2 TD
Mary Hardin–Baylor	Rushing	Kenneth Cormier	12 rushes, 69 yards, TD
Mary Hardin–Baylor	Receiving	Brandon Jordan	5 receptions, 116 yards, 2 TD

=== East Texas Baptist ===
East Texas Baptist Tigers at No. 1 Mary Hardin–Baylor Crusaders – Game summary

Quarter	1	2	3	4	Total
Tigers	0	0	7	7	14
No. 1 Crusaders	17	7	7	3	34

at Crusader Stadium, Belton, Texas

- Date: September 11
- Game time: 1:00 p.m. CDT
- Game weather: Sunny, 90 °F (32 °C)
- Game attendance: 5,006
- Referee: James Minor
- Box score, Recap

Game information
First quarter
- MHB – Anthony Avila 45-yard field goal, 12:00. Crusaders 3–0. Drive: 5 plays, 30 yards, 2:54.
- MHB – Jefferson Fritz 44-yard punt return (Anthony Avila kick), 10:45. Crusaders 10–0.
- MHB – Kyle King 1-yard run (Anthony Avila kick), 5:34. Crusaders 17–0. Drive: 7 plays, 67 yards, 2:49.

Second quarter

- MHB – Gary Ruckman 21-yard pass from Kyle King (Anthony Avila kick), 0:24. Crusaders 24–0. Drive: 10 plays, 79 yards, 4:00.

Third quarter

- MHB – Aphonso Thomas 11-yard pass from Kyle King (Anthony Avila kick), 10:05. Crusaders 31–0. Drive: 8 plays, 65 yards, 3:43.
- ETB – Chase Thompson 86-yard fumble return (Alberto Garcia kick), 0:23. Crusaders 31–7.

Fourth quarter

- MHB – Anthony Avila 39-yard field goal, 9:14. Crusaders 34–7. Drive: 7 plays, 22 yards, 3:25.
- ETB – Noel Shane 1-yard run (Alberto Garcia kick), 0:08. Crusaders 34–14. Drive: 6 plays, 28 yards, 2:02.

Statistics	ETB	MHB
First downs	12	21
Total yards	205	353
Rushing yards	102	208
Passing yards	103	145
Turnovers	2	2
Time of possession	28:07	31:53

Team	Category	Player	Statistics
East Texas Baptist	Passing	Troy Yowman	10/24, 75 yards
East Texas Baptist	Rushing	Cornelius Merchant	11 rushes, 96 yards
East Texas Baptist	Receiving	Tariq Gray	4 receptions, 81 yards
Mary Hardin–Baylor	Passing	Kyle King	6/12, 145 yards, 2 TD
Mary Hardin–Baylor	Rushing	Aphonso Thomas	26 rushes, 99 yards
Mary Hardin–Baylor	Receiving	Brandon Jordan	2 receptions, 55 yards

=== At Southwestern (TX) ===
No. 1 Mary Hardin–Baylor Crusaders at Southwestern Pirates – Game summary

Quarter	1	2	3	4	Total
No. 1 Crusaders	20	20	7	7	54
Pirates	3	0	0	0	3

at Birkelbach Stadium, Georgetown, Texas

- Date: September 18
- Game time: 7:00 p.m. CDT
- Game attendance: 0
- Referee: Duane Martin
- Box score, Recap

Game information
First quarter
- MHB – K. J. Miller 71-yard pass from Kyle King (Anthony Avila kick), 14:19. Crusaders 7–0. Drive: 2 plays, 80 yards, 0:34.
- MHB – Brenton Martin 37-yard pass from Kyle King (Anthony Avila kick), 12:15. Crusaders 14–0. Drive: 2 plays, 42 yards, 0:37.
- SW – Wil Herbst 39-yard field goal, 4:10. Crusaders 14–3. Drive: 8 plays, 58 yards, 4:06.
- MHB – Josh Patterson 14-yard interception return (kick failed), 1:15. Crusaders 20–3.

Second quarter

- MHB – Kyle King 5-yard run (kick failed), 12:31. Crusaders 26–3. Drive: 5 plays, 27 yards, 2:29.
- MHB – K. J. Miller 19-yard pass from Kyle King (Brandon Cunning kick), 5:37. Crusaders 33–3. Drive: 8 plays, 70 yards, 3:39.
- MHB – Kyle King 3-yard run (Brandon Cunning kick), 0:53. Crusaders 40–3. Drive: 7 plays, 76 yards, 2:52.

Third quarter

- MHB – Aphonso Thomas 6-yard run (Brandon Cunning kick), 13:42. Crusaders 47–3. Drive: 3 plays, 28 yards, 1:08.

Fourth quarter

- MHB – Tommy Bowden 84-yard run (Brandon Cunning kick), 12:23. Crusaders 54–3. Drive: 1 play, 84 yards, 0:12.

Statistics	MHB	SW
First downs	25	7
Total yards	569	145
Rushing yards	277	68
Passing yards	292	77
Turnovers	2	4
Time of possession	37:05	22:55

Team	Category	Player	Statistics
Mary Hardin–Baylor	Passing	Kyle King	11/18, 246 yards, 3 TD, INT
Mary Hardin–Baylor	Rushing	Tommy Bowden	2 rushes, 91 yards, TD
Mary Hardin–Baylor	Receiving	K. J. Miller	7 receptions, 139 yards, 2 TD
Southwestern	Passing	Landry Gilpin	6/13, 56 yards, 2 INT
Southwestern	Rushing	Jaquon Marion	11 rushes, 27 yards
Southwestern	Receiving	Ethan Powell	2 receptions, 40 yards

=== No. 7 Hardin–Simmons ===
No. 7 Hardin–Simmons Cowboys at No. 2 Mary Hardin–Baylor Crusaders – Game summary

Quarter	1	2	3	4	Total
No. 7 Cowboys	7	21	0	0	28
No. 2 Crusaders	7	0	21	6	34

at Crusader Stadium, Belton, Texas

- Date: September 25
- Game time: 6:00 p.m. CDT
- Game weather: Sunny, 89 °F (32 °C)
- Game attendance: 7,018
- Referee: Larry Brown
- Box score, Recap

Game information
First quarter
- HSU – Gaylon Glynn 7-yard run (Jamie Pogue kick), 10:56. Cowboys 7–0. Drive: 8 plays, 74 yards, 4:00.
- MHB – K. J. Miller 27-yard pass from Kyle King (Anthony Avila kick), 9:04. Tied 7–7. Drive: 3 plays, 77 yards, 1:44.

Second quarter

- HSU – Kolby Youngblood 33-yard run (Jamie Pogue kick), 14:54. Cowboys 14–7. Drive: 11 plays, 91 yards, 5:53.
- HSU – Kevi Evans 24-yard pass from Kyle Jones (Jamie Pogue kick), 13:16. Cowboys 21–7. Drive: 1 play, 24 yards, 0:11.
- HSU – Myles Featherston 65-yard run (Jamie Pogue kick), 6:54. Cowboys 28–7. Drive: 7 plays, 81 yards, 4:03.

Third quarter

- MHB – Brandon Jordan 9-yard pass from Kyle King (Anthony Avila kick), 11:57. Cowboys 28–14. Drive: 6 plays, 64 yards, 2:55.
- MHB – Connor Mullins 5-yard pass from Kyle King (Anthony Avila kick), 6:39. Cowboys 28–21. Drive: 5 plays, 32 yards, 3:34.
- MHB – Romello Cook 7-yard pass from Kyle King (Anthony Avila kick), 2:57. Tied 28–28. Drive: 6 plays, 65 yards, 2:43.

Fourth quarter

- MHB – Brandon Jordan 14-yard pass from Kyle King (kick failed), 6:06. Crusaders 34–28. Drive: 5 plays, 80 yards, 1:59.

Statistics	HSU	MHB
First downs	19	23
Total yards	382	435
Rushing yards	220	202
Passing yards	162	233
Turnovers	1	2
Time of possession	31:01	28:59

Team	Category	Player	Statistics
Hardin–Simmons	Passing	Kyle Jones	19/33, 162 yards, TD, INT
Hardin–Simmons	Rushing	Myles Featherson	8 rushes, 94 yards, TD
Hardin–Simmons	Receiving	Gatlin Martin	4 receptions, 48 yards
Mary Hardin–Baylor	Passing	Kyle King	17/25, 233 yards, 5 TD
Mary Hardin–Baylor	Rushing	Kenneth Cormier	13 rushes, 90 yards
Mary Hardin–Baylor	Receiving	Brandon Jordan	6 receptions, 126 yards, 2 TD

=== At Austin ===
No. 2 Mary Hardin–Baylor Crusaders at Austin Kangaroos – Game summary

Quarter	1	2	3	4	Total
No. 2 Crusaders	21	14	7	14	56
Kangaroos	0	0	0	0	0

at Apple Stadium, Sherman, Texas

- Date: October 2
- Game time: 1:00 p.m. CDT
- Game attendance: 1,037
- Box score, Recap

Game information
First quarter
- MHB – Aaron Sims 37-yard pass from Kyle King (Brandon Cunning kick), 13:54. Crusaders 7–0. Drive: 3 plays, 71 yards, 0:59.
- MHB – Brenton Martin 34-yard pass from Kyle King (Brandon Cunning kick), 5:00. Crusaders 14–0. Drive: 3 plays, 35 yards, 1:18.
- MHB – Kyle King 52-yard run (Brandon Cunning kick), 2:37. Crusaders 21–0. Drive: 1 play, 52 yards, 0:11.

Second quarter

- MHB – Aphonso Thomas 1-yard run (Brandon Cunning kick), 12:33. Crusaders 28–0. Drive: 3 plays, 5 yards, 0:42.
- MHB – Brenton Martin 11-yard pass from Tommy Bowden (Brandon Cunning kick), 6:53. Crusaders 35–0. Drive: 8 plays, 36 yards, 3:39.

Third quarter

- MHB – Kyle King 4-yard run (Brandon Cunning kick), 6:47. Crusaders 42–0. Drive: 10 plays, 49 yards, 5:04.

Fourth quarter

- MHB – Tommy Bowden 15-yard run (Brandon Cunning kick), 14:10. Crusaders 49–0. Drive: 11 plays, 65 yards, 5:18.
- MHB – Montana Miller 2-yard run (Brandon Cunning kick), 1:53. Crusaders 56–0. Drive: 9 plays, 76 yards, 4:42.

Statistics	MHB	AC
First downs	26	8
Total yards	480	117
Rushing yards	297	89
Passing yards	183	28
Turnovers	1	0
Time of possession	27:22	32:38

Team	Category	Player	Statistics
Mary Hardin–Baylor	Passing	Kyle King	8/10, 141 yards, 2 TD
Mary Hardin–Baylor	Rushing	Aphonso Thomas	9 rushes, 63 yards, TD
Mary Hardin–Baylor	Receiving	Brenton Martin	3 receptions, 61 yards, 2 TD
Austin	Passing	Tyler James	7/15, 28 yards
Austin	Rushing	Maurice Reed	7 rushes, 31 yards
Austin	Receiving	Maurice Reed	3 receptions, 17 yards

=== Texas Lutheran ===
Texas Lutheran Bulldogs at No. 2 Mary Hardin–Baylor Crusaders – Game summary

Quarter	1	2	3	4	Total
Bulldogs	0	0	0	3	3
No. 2 Crusaders	21	14	7	7	49

at Crusader Stadium, Belton, Texas

- Date: October 16
- Game time: 1:00 p.m. CDT
- Game weather: Sunny
- Game attendance: 3,024
- Referee: Andy Dunklin
- Box score, Recap

Game information
First quarter
- MHB – Aphonso Thomas 53-yard run (Anthony Avila kick), 11:39. Crusaders 7–0. Drive: 1 play, 53 yards, 0:09.
- MHB – K. J. Miller 50-yard pass from Kyle King (Anthony Avila kick), 6:18. Crusaders 14–0. Drive: 1 play, 50 yards, 0:03.
- MHB – Brandon Jordan 1-yard pass from Kyle King (Anthony Avila kick), 0:56. Crusaders 21–0. Drive: 10 plays, 57 yards, 3:26.

Second quarter

- MHB – Gary Ruckman 16-yard pass from Kyle King (Anthony Avila kick), 12:10. Crusaders 28–0. Drive: 4 plays, 40 yards, 1:04.
- MHB – Kyle King 3-yard run (Anthony Avila kick), 4:55. Crusaders 35–0. Drive: 13 plays, 79 yards, 5:18.

Third quarter

- MHB – K. J. Miller 7-yard pass from Kyle King (Anthony Avila kick), 10:09. Crusaders 42–0. Drive: 11 plays, 69 yards, 4:43.

Fourth quarter

- MHB – Montana Miller 5-yard run (Brandon Cunningham kick), 7:10. Crusaders 49–0. Drive: 6 plays, 29 yards, 2:42.
- TLU – Juan Ocampo 43-yard field goal, 2:10. Crusaders 49–3. Drive: 6 plays, 8 yards, 2:37.

Statistics	TLU	MHB
First downs	9	25
Total yards	124	455
Rushing yards	69	253
Passing yards	55	202
Turnovers	3	2
Time of possession	33:17	26:43

Team	Category	Player	Statistics
Texas Lutheran	Passing	Seth Cosme	8/15, 55 yards, INT
Texas Lutheran	Rushing	Seth Cosme	17 rushes, 40 yards
Texas Lutheran	Receiving	Roland Bland Jr.	2 receptions, 22 yards
Mary Hardin–Baylor	Passing	Kyle King	16/25, 180 yards, 4 TD
Mary Hardin–Baylor	Rushing	Aphonso Thomas	12 rushes, 136 yards, TD
Mary Hardin–Baylor	Receiving	K. J. Miller	6 receptions, 92 yards, 2 TD

=== At Sul Ross ===
No. 2 Mary Hardin–Baylor Crusaders at Sul Ross Lobos – Game summary

Quarter	1	2	3	4	Total
No. 2 Crusaders	7	31	14	20	72
Lobos	0	7	7	0	14

at Jackson Field, Alpine, Texas

- Date: October 23
- Game time: 12:00 p.m. CDT
- Game weather: Sunny, 74 °F (23 °C)
- Game attendance: 0
- Referee: Jeff Bell
- Box score, Recap

Game information
First quarter
- MHB – Kyle King 2-yard run (Anthony Avila kick), 5:32. Crusaders 7–0. Drive: 4 plays, 40 yards, 2:01.

Second quarter

- MHB – K. J. Miller 88-yard punt return (Anthony Avila kick), 12:58. Crusaders 14–0.
- MHB – Anthony Avila 35-yard field goal, 11:28. Crusaders 17–0. Drive: 4 plays, 0 yards, 1:12.
- SRS – Vicente Luevano 52-yard pass from T. J. Deshields (Jaden Brown kick), 7:24. Crusaders 17–7. Drive: 1 play, 52 yards, 0:08.
- MHB – Aphonso Thomas 1-yard run (Anthony Avila kick), 3:59. Crusaders 24–7. Drive: 7 plays, 55 yards, 3:19.
- MHB – K. J. Miller 14-yard pass from Kyle King (Anthony Avila kick), 1:15. Crusaders 31–7. Drive: 5 plays, 50 yards, 2:14.
- MHB – Brandon Jordan 40-yard pass from Kyle King (Anthony Avila kick), 0:41. Crusaders 38–7. Drive: 1 play, 40 yards, 0:07.

Third quarter

- SRS – Ozias Wright 80-yard pass from T. J. Deshields (Jaden Brown kick), 12:51. Crusaders 38–14. Drive: 1 play, 80 yards, 0:13.
- MHB – Brenton Martin 30-yard pass from Kyle King (Anthony Avila kick), 10:10. Crusaders 45–14. Drive: 7 plays, 55 yards, 2:41.
- MHB – Connor Mullins 12-yard pass from Ryan Redding (Anthony Avila kick), 5:27. Crusaders 52–14. Drive: 7 plays, 47 yards, 3:33.

Fourth quarter

- MHB – Ryan Redding 14-yard run (Anthony Avila kick), 14:44. Crusaders 59–14. Drive: 7 plays, 58 yards, 3:27.
- MHB – Brenton Martin 55-yard pass from Ryan Redding (kick failed), 11:45. Crusaders 65–14. Drive: 3 plays, 55 yards, 1:15.
- MHB – Aaron Sims 68-yard pass from Ryan Redding (Anthony Avila kick), 6:12. Crusaders 72–14. Drive: 3 plays, 70 yards, 2:02.

Statistics	MHB	SRS
First downs	26	7
Total yards	573	219
Rushing yards	208	42
Passing yards	365	177
Turnovers	2	2
Time of possession	20:58	39:02

Team	Category	Player	Statistics
Mary Hardin–Baylor	Passing	Ryan Redding	10/13, 201 yards, 3 TD
Mary Hardin–Baylor	Rushing	Aphonso Thomas	14 rushes, 86 yards, TD
Mary Hardin–Baylor	Receiving	Benton Martin	5 receptions, 106 yards, 2 TD
Sul Ross	Passing	T. J. Deshields	5/16, 173 yards, 2 TD, INT
Sul Ross	Rushing	Ozias Wright	12 rushes, 20 yards
Sul Ross	Receiving	Vicente Luevano	2 receptions, 85 yards, TD

=== Belhaven ===
Belhaven Blazers at No. 2 Mary Hardin–Baylor Crusaders – Game summary

Quarter	1	2	3	4	Total
Blazers	0	0	0	0	0
No. 2 Crusaders	7	3	7	12	29

at Crusader Stadium, Belton, Texas

- Date: October 30
- Game time: 12:00 p.m. CDT
- Game weather: Sunny
- Game attendance: 2,377
- Referee: Joe Horn
- Box score, Recap

Game information
First quarter
- MHB – Ryan Redding 14-yard run (Anthony Avila kick), 8:08. Crusaders 7–0. Drive: 6 plays, 89 yards, 2:46.

Second quarter

- MHB – Anthony Avila 25-yard field goal, 0:13. Crusaders 10–0. Drive: 6 plays, 46 yards, 0:56.

Third quarter

- MHB – Aphonso Thomas 1-yard run (Anthony Avila kick), 1:26. Crusaders 17–0. Drive: 8 plays, 52 yards, 3:18.

Fourth quarter

- MHB – Aphonso Thomas 11-yard run (kick blocked), 8:30. Crusaders 23–0. Drive: 4 plays, 46 yards, 1:16.
- MHB – Montana Miller 4-yard run (kick failed), 2:05. Crusaders 29–0. Drive: 2 plays, 10 yards, 0:38.

Statistics	BEL	MHB
First downs	16	16
Total yards	237	291
Rushing yards	100	177
Passing yards	137	114
Turnovers	1	0
Time of possession	39:01	20:59

Team	Category	Player	Statistics
Belhaven	Passing	Mayowa Asagunla	15/27, 137 yards, INT
Belhaven	Rushing	Mayowa Asagunla	18 rushes, 63 yards
Belhaven	Receiving	Michael Simpson	6 receptions, 73 yards
Mary Hardin–Baylor	Passing	Ryan Redding	8/20, 114 yards
Mary Hardin–Baylor	Rushing	Aphonso Thomas	11 rushes, 61 yards, 2 TD
Mary Hardin–Baylor	Receiving	Brenton Martin	4 receptions, 57 yards

=== Howard Payne ===
Howard Payne Yellow Jackets at No. 2 Mary Hardin–Baylor Crusaders – Game summary

Quarter	1	2	3	4	Total
Yellow Jackets	14	0	0	0	14
No. 2 Crusaders	21	14	14	10	59

at Crusader Stadium, Belton, Texas

- Date: November 6
- Game time: 12:00 p.m. CDT
- Game weather: Sunny
- Game attendance: 2,797
- Referee: Robert Newton
- Box score, Recap

Statistics	HPU	MHB
First downs	15	32
Total yards	333	616
Rushing yards	71	268
Passing yards	262	348
Turnovers	3	0
Time of possession	26:33	33:27

Team	Category	Player	Statistics
Howard Payne	Passing	Nick Infante	14/29, 147 yards, 3 INT
Howard Payne	Rushing	Nick Infante	11 rushes, 33 yards
Howard Payne	Receiving	Jake Parker	3 receptions, 129 yards, 2 TD
Mary Hardin–Baylor	Passing	Ryan Redding	21/28, 307 yards, 2 TD
Mary Hardin–Baylor	Rushing	Ryan Redding	12 rushes, 98 yards, 2 TD
Mary Hardin–Baylor	Receiving	K. J. Miller	12 receptions, 165 yards

=== At McMurry ===
No. 2 Mary Hardin–Baylor Crusaders at McMurry War Hawks – Game summary

Quarter	1	2	3	4	Total
No. 2 Crusaders	28	21	14	14	77
War Hawks	0	0	0	3	3

at Wilford Moore Stadium, Abilene, Texas

- Date: November 13
- Game time: 1:00 p.m. CST
- Game weather: Sunny, 66 °F (19 °C)
- Game attendance: 1,750
- Referee: Dal Watson
- Box score, Recap

Statistics	MHB	MCM
First downs	29	11
Total yards	546	180
Rushing yards	300	86
Passing yards	246	94
Turnovers	0	2
Time of possession	28:35	30:28

Team	Category	Player	Statistics
Mary Hardin–Baylor	Passing	Kyle King	9/17, 154 yards, 3 TD
Mary Hardin–Baylor	Rushing	Kenneth Cormier	15 rushes, 88 yards, 2 TD
Mary Hardin–Baylor	Receiving	K. J. Miller	4 receptions, 67 yards, TD
McMurry	Passing	Dexter Wyble	13/29, 94 yards
McMurry	Rushing	Dee Robinson	7 rushes, 49 yards
McMurry	Receiving	Zachary Wood	2 receptions, 31 yards

== NCAA Division III playoffs ==
=== No. 16 Trinity (TX) (First Round) ===
NCAA Division III First Round
No. 16 Trinity Tigers at No. 2 Mary Hardin–Baylor Crusaders – Game summary

Quarter	1	2	3	4	Total
No. 16 Tigers	3	0	0	0	3
No. 2 Crusaders	0	3	3	7	13

at Crusader Stadium, Belton, Texas

- Date: November 20
- Game time: 12:00 p.m. CST
- Game weather: Cloudy
- Game attendance: 0
- Referee: Steve Heyman
- Box score, Recap

Game information
First quarter
- TRN – Blake Lin 28-yard field goal, 6:23. Tigers 3–0. Drive: 9 plays, 59 yards, 4:03.

Second quarter

- MHB – Anthony Avila 42-yard field goal, 0:59. Tied 3–3. Drive: 11 plays, 45 yards, 4:43.

Third quarter

- MHB – Brandon Cunningham 33-yard field goal, 4:09. Crusaders 6–3. Drive: 13 plays, 64 yards, 5:58.

Fourth quarter

- MHB – Aphonso Thompson 17-yard run (Brandon Cunningham kick), 2:05. Crusaders 13–3. Drive: 5 plays, 61 yards, 1:44.

Statistics	TRN	MHB
First downs	10	15
Total yards	212	307
Rushing yards	22	179
Passing yards	190	128
Turnovers	2	2
Time of possession	28:11	31:49

Team	Category	Player	Statistics
Trinity	Passing	Tucker Horn	20/40, 190 yards, 2 INT
Trinity	Rushing	Winston Hutchinson	16 rushes, 26 yards
Trinity	Receiving	Ryan Merrifield	5 receptions, 58 yards
Mary Hardin–Baylor	Passing	Kyle King	10/22, 128 yards, INT
Mary Hardin–Baylor	Rushing	Aphonso Thomas	26 rushes, 118 yards, TD
Mary Hardin–Baylor	Receiving	Brenton Martin	3 receptions, 60 yards

=== No. 19 Birmingham–Southern (Second Round) ===
NCAA Division III Second Round
No. 19 Birmingham–Southern Panthers at No. 2 Mary Hardin–Baylor Crusaders – Game summary

Quarter	1	2	3	4	Total
No. 19 Panthers	7	0	0	0	7
No. 2 Crusaders	14	7	7	14	42

at Crusader Stadium, Belton, Texas

- Date: November 27
- Game time: 1:00 p.m. CST
- Game weather: Rain, 48 °F (9 °C)
- Game attendance: 1,455
- Referee: Jeffry Davis
- Box score, Recap

Game information
First quarter
- MHB – K. J. Miller 21-yard pass from Ryan Redding (Anthony Avila kick), 7:40. Crusaders 7–0. Drive: 8 plays, 63 yards, 3:09.
- BSC – D. J. Albright 89-yard kickoff return (Zach Ford kick), 7:27. Tied 7–7.
- MHB – K. J. Miller 6-yard pass from Ryan Redding (Anthony Avila kick), 2:36. Crusaders 14–7. Drive: 10 plays, 64 yards, 4:44.

Second quarter

- MHB – Kenneth Cormier 3-yard run (Anthony Avila kick), 7:15. Crusaders 21–7. Drive: 2 plays, 7 yards, 0:37.

Third quarter

- MHB – Kenneth Cormier 1-yard run (Anthony Avila kick), 3:26. Crusaders 28–7. Drive: 7 plays, 55 yards, 3:04.

Fourth quarter

- MHB – Brandon Jordan 63-yard pass from Ryan Redding (Anthony Avila kick), 13:30. Crusaders 35–7. Drive: 5 plays, 70 yards, 2:35.
- MHB – Aphonso Thomas 15-yard run (Anthony Avila kick), 7:01. Crusaders 42–7. Drive: 7 plays, 78 yards, 2:41.

Statistics	BSC	MHB
First downs	10	21
Total yards	243	450
Rushing yards	101	199
Passing yards	142	251
Turnovers	1	0
Time of possession	26:35	33:25

Team	Category	Player	Statistics
Birmingham–Southern	Passing	Trey Patterson	11/23, 142 yards, INT
Birmingham–Southern	Rushing	Robert Shufford	10 rushes, 60 yards
Birmingham–Southern	Receiving	Race Marin	3 receptions, 56 yards
Mary Hardin–Baylor	Passing	Ryan Redding	14/23, 251 yards, 3 TD
Mary Hardin–Baylor	Rushing	Kenneth Cormier	16 rushes, 65 yards, 2 TD
Mary Hardin–Baylor	Receiving	Brandon Jordan	3 receptions, 101 yards, TD

=== No. 7 Linfield (Quarterfinal) ===
NCAA Division III Quarterfinal
No. 7 Linfield Wildcats at No. 2 Mary Hardin–Baylor Crusaders – Game summary

Quarter	1	2	3	4	Total
No. 7 Wildcats	3	7	7	7	24
No. 2 Crusaders	7	21	14	7	49

at Crusader Stadium, Belton, Texas

- Date: December 4
- Game time: 12:00 p.m. CST
- Game weather: Cloudy
- Game attendance: 0
- Referee: Jack Thorn
- Box score, Recap

Game information
First quarter
- LIN – Andrew Starkel 21-yard field goal, 7:04. Wildcats 3–0. Drive: 14 plays, 60 yards, 6:26.
- MHB – Brenton Martin 58-yard pass from K. J. Miller (Anthony Avila kick), 2:18. Crusaders 7–3. Drive: 5 plays, 84 yards, 2:17.

Second quarter

- MHB – Brandon Jordan 11-yard pass from Kyle King (Anthony Avila kick), 8:01. Crusaders 14–3. Drive: 13 plays, 80 yards, 6:44.
- MHB – Brenton Martin 57-yard pass from Kyle King (Anthony Avila kick), 2:43. Crusaders 21–3. Drive: 5 plays, 80 yards, 2:05.
- LIN – Connor McNabb 70-yard pass from Wyatt Smith (Andrew Starkel kick), 1:53. Crusaders 21–10. Drive: 2 plays, 75 yards, 0:49.
- MHB – Brandon Jordan 20-yard pass from Kyle King (Anthony Avila kick), 0:32. Crusaders 28–10. Drive: 5 plays, 70 yards, 1:13.

Third quarter

- LIN – Joel Valadez 30-yard pass from Wyatt Smith (Andrew Starkel kick), 7:07. Crusaders 28–17. Drive: 6 plays, 65 yards, 2:45.
- MHB – K. J. Miller 15-yard pass from Kyle King (Anthony Avila kick), 4:18. Crusaders 35–17. Drive: 7 plays, 75 yards, 2:49.
- MHB – Brandon Jordan 41-yard pass from Kyle King (Anthony Avila kick), 0:59. Crusaders 42–17. Drive: 3 plays, 80 yards, 1:14.

Fourth quarter

- LIN – Joel Valadez 10-yard pass from Wyatt Smith (Andrew Starkel kick), 12:37. Crusaders 42–24. Drive: 8 plays, 68 yards, 3:16.
- MHB – Gary Ruckman 4-yard pass from Kyle King (Anthony Avila kick), 3:05. Crusaders 49–24. Drive: 6 plays, 41 yards, 3:33.

Statistics	LIN	MHB
First downs	22	24
Total yards	472	538
Rushing yards	30	135
Passing yards	442	403
Turnovers	1	0
Time of possession	32:11	27:49

Team	Category	Player	Statistics
Linfield	Passing	Wyatt Smith	42/51, 442 yards, 3 TD
Linfield	Rushing	Connor McNabb	11 rushes, 48 yards
Linfield	Receiving	Joel Valadez	13 receptions, 121 yards, 2 TD
Mary Hardin–Baylor	Passing	Kyle King	24/32, 345 yards, 6 TD
Mary Hardin–Baylor	Rushing	Aphonso Thomas	9 rushes, 60 yards
Mary Hardin–Baylor	Receiving	Brandon Jordan	7 receptions, 136 yards, 3 TD

=== At No. 3 Wisconsin–Whitewater (Semifinal) ===
NCAA Division III Semifinal
No. 2 Mary Hardin–Baylor Crusaders at No. 3 Wisconsin–Whitewater Warhawks – Game summary

Quarter	1	2	3	4	Total
No. 2 Crusaders	0	17	7	0	24
No. 3 Warhawks	0	7	0	0	7

at Forrest Perkins Stadium, Whitewater, Wisconsin

- Date: December 11
- Game time: 2:30 p.m. CST
- Game weather: Sunny, 36 °F (2 °C)
- Game attendance: 2,519
- Referee: Coady Adams
- TV: ESPN+
- Box score, Recap

Game information
First quarter
- No scoring plays

Second quarter

- MHB – Brandon Jordan 9-yard pass from Kyle King (Anthony Avila kick), 13:00. Crusaders 7–0. Drive: 14 plays, 82 yards, 5:46.
- MHB – Brandon Jordan 9-yard pass from Kyle King (Anthony Avila kick), 9:46. Crusaders 14–0. Drive: 6 plays, 65 yards, 2:25.
- MHB – Anthony Avila 44-yard field goal, 6:01. Crusaders 17–0. Drive: 5 plays, 28 yards, 1:14.
- UWW – Tyler Holte 9-yard pass from Max Meylor (Matt Maldonado kick), 1:01. Crusaders 17–7. Drive: 12 plays, 80 yards, 4:55.

Third quarter

- MHB – Kenneth Cromier 1-yard run (Anthony Avila kick), 6:31. Crusaders 24–7. Drive: 11 plays, 76 yards, 4:37.

Fourth quarter

- No scoring plays

Statistics	MHB	UWW
First downs	17	16
Total yards	378	271
Rushing yards	69	64
Passing yards	309	207
Turnovers	0	2
Time of possession	30:20	29:40

Team	Category	Player	Statistics
Mary Hardin–Baylor	Passing	Kyle King	22/33, 309 yards, 2 TD
Mary Hardin–Baylor	Rushing	Aphonso Thomas	26 rushes, 79 yards
Mary Hardin–Baylor	Receiving	Brandon Jordan	11 receptions, 164 yards, 2 TD
Wisconsin–Whitewater	Passing	Max Meylor	23/32, 207 yards, TD, INT
Wisconsin–Whitewater	Rushing	Alex Peete	20 rushes, 43 yards
Wisconsin–Whitewater	Receiving	Tyler Holte	6 receptions, 91 yards, TD

=== Vs. No. 1 North Central (IL) (Stagg Bowl) ===
Stagg Bowl (NCAA Division III Championship)
No. 2 Mary Hardin–Baylor Crusaders vs. No. 1 North Central Tigers – Game summary

Quarter	1	2	3	4	Total
No. 2 Crusaders	16	3	14	24	57
No. 1 Cardinals	7	10	0	7	24

at Tom Benson Hall of Fame Stadium, Canton, Ohio

- Date: December 17
- Game time: 7:00 p.m. CST/8:00 p.m. EST
- Game weather: Cloudy, 38 °F (3 °C)
- Game attendance: 1,830
- Referee: Stuart Hindman
- TV: ESPNU
- Box score, Recap

Game information
First quarter
- NCC – Deangelo Hardy 93-yard kickoff return (Tanner Rains kick), 14:48. Cardinals 7–0.
- MHB – Brandon Cunningham 32-yard field goal, 11:51. Cardinals 7–3. Drive: 6 plays, 62 yards, 2:53.
- MHB – Brandon Jordan 19-yard pass from Kyle King (kick failed), 9:39. Crusaders 9–7. Drive: 3 plays, 25 yards, 0:47.
- MHB – K. J. Miller 19-yard pass from Kyle King (Brandon Cunningham kick), 2:14. Crusaders 16–7. Drive: 6 plays, 83 yards, 3:04.

Second quarter

- NCC – Ethan Greenfield 1-yard run (Tanner Rains kick), 5:32. Crusaders 16–14. Drive: 14 plays, 90 yards, 6:58.
- NCC – Tanner Rains 22-yard field goal, 2:05. Cardinals 17–16. Drive: 6 plays, 39 yards, 2:35.
- MHB – Brandon Cunningham 22-yard field goal, 0:00. Crusaders 19–17. Drive: 8 plays, 56 yards, 1:58.

Third quarter

- MHB – Aphonso Thomas 15-yard run (Brandon Cunningham kick), 9:39. Crusaders 26–17. Drive: 12 plays, 81 yards, 5:13.
- MHB – Aphonso Thomas 3-yard run (Brandon Cunningham kick), 1:31. Crusaders 33–17. Drive: 10 plays, 91 yards, 4:55.

Fourth quarter

- MHB – Brandon Cunningham 20-yard field goal, 14:49. Crusaders 36–17. Drive: 4 plays, 1 yard, 0:53.
- MHB – Kenneth Cormier 11-yard run (Brandon Cunningham kick), 10:10. Crusaders 43–17. Drive: 5 plays, 46 yards, 2:09.
- NCC – Blake Williams 30-yard pass from Luke Lehnen (Tanner Rains kick), 7:47. Crusaders 43–24. Drive: 7 plays, 71 yards, 2:19.
- MHB – Aaron Sims 37-yard pass from Kyle King (Brandon Cunningham kick), 6:01. Crusaders 50–24. Drive: 3 plays, 39 yards, 1:44.
- MHB – Brenton Martin 17-yard pass from Ryan Redding (Brandon Cunningham kick), 0:42. Crusaders 57–24. Drive: 6 plays, 53 yards, 3:16.

Statistics	MHB	NCC
First downs	28	18
Total yards	596	287
Rushing yards	133	85
Passing yards	463	202
Turnovers	2	4
Time of possession	28:48	31:12

Team	Category	Player	Statistics
Mary Hardin–Baylor	Passing	Kyle King	22/29, 436 yards, 3 TD
Mary Hardin–Baylor	Rushing	Aphonso Thomas	13 rushes, 65 yards, 2 TD
Mary Hardin–Baylor	Receiving	Brenton Martin	9 receptions, 196 yards, TD
North Central	Passing	Luke Lehnen	18/27, 202 yards, TD, 3 INT
North Central	Rushing	Ethan Greenfield	25 rushes, 124 yards, TD
North Central	Receiving	Andrew Kamienski	8 receptions, 115 yards

== Personnel ==
2021 Mary Hardin–Baylor Crusaders football team roster
Players
Coaches
Offense

Pos.	#	Name	Class
WR	1	Brenton Martin	Sr
WR	4	Aaron Sims	Sr
RB	5	Aphonso Thomas	Jr
WR	7	K. J. Miller	Sr
QB	9	Jackson Tingler	So
QB	11	Jackson Tingley	So
QB	12	Ryan Redding	Sr
QB	14	Caden Steubing	So
WR	15	Jamaal Hamilton	Jr
QB	17	Kyle King (C)	Sr
WR	18	D. J. Weaver	Sr
WR	21	Brandon Jordan	Sr
RB	22	Montana Miller	So
RB	23	Marc Gutierrez	Jr
RB	27	Kenneth Cormier Jr.	So
WR	30	Chaka Watson	So
RB	34	Alex Acuna	Sr
OL	53	Jacob Dailey	So
OL	59	Ethan Ruckman	So
OL	60	Matt Sanders	Jr
OL	61	Jeffrey Sims Jr.	Sr
OL	62	Lance Jones	Sr
OL	63	Donovan Barrett	Fr
OL	64	Hayes Chizer	So
OL	67	John Schnautz	Fr
OL	68	Hayden Hopkins	Fr
OL	71	John Kazmierski	Sr
OL	72	Wyatt Crawford	So
OL	73	Adam Dobbins	Sr
OL	74	Kyle Wente	Fr
OL	75	Cameron Williams	Sr
OL	76	Reuel Tandoh	So
OL	77	Jesse Hoke	So
OL	78	Tyler Prassel	Fr
WR	81	Jalen Shepherd	Fr
TE	82	Gary Ruckman (C)	Sr
WR	84	Jerry Day Jr.	Fr
TE	86	Adam Strawn	Jr
TE	87	Colby Olivier	Jr
TE	88	Connor Mullins	So
QB		Colby Bailey	Fr
TE		Devin Barr	Fr
WR		Chance Beachum	Fr
WR		Tyjayzeon Bell	Fr
OL		Tristan Bermea	Fr
QB		Brad Campbell	Fr
OL		Caedmon Carter	Fr
QB		Jerry Cephus	Fr
OL		Loegan Chance	Fr
RB		Shemar Cheever	Fr
TE		JoJo Clark	Fr
OL		Cody Coffman	Fr
OL		Jacob Cote	Fr
WR		Scott Curtis	Fr
QB		William Eaton	Fr
QB		Trapper Ensor	Fr
OL		Kaden Franklin	Fr
WR		Kybran Frazier	Fr
QB		Caleb Freeman	Fr
WR		D. J. Freeman	Fr
QB		Kyler Gibson	So
OL		David Gonzalez	Fr
OL		Win Goodwin	Fr
RB		Sylvester Hardeman	Fr
RB		Wade Harper	Fr
QB		Landon Howell	Fr
QB		Keynan Jackson	Fr
RB		Matthew Jackson	Fr
WR		Mason Lemme	So
TE		Bryce Lesar	Fr
OL		Timothy Marwitz	Fr
RB		Julius Mason	Fr
OL		Marshall Mays	Fr
OL		Hunter McCall	Fr
OL		Nathan Moczygemba	Fr
TE		Hunter Nucci	Fr
WR		Irvin Paige	Fr
OL		Jordan Perry	Fr
OL		Isaac Rodriguez	Fr
QB		Micah Rodriguez	Fr
RB		Isaiah Salazar	Fr
OL		James Salcido	Fr
WR		Caleb Sanders	Fr
OL		Connor Schomburg	Fr
OL		Landon Sluka	Fr
RB		Mason Stewart	Fr
OL		Aidan Tidwell	Fr
WR		Emilio Vargas	Fr
OL		Tyler Vogan	Fr
RB		Marques Washington	Fr
OL		Chris Webb	Fr
QB		Brylee White	Fr
OL		Zachary Wilkinson	Fr

Defense

Pos.	#	Name	Class
CB	0	Keith Gibson	Sr
DB	2	Jefferson Fritz (C)	Sr
LB	3	Akeem Jackson	Sr
CB	9	Titus Dunk	Jr
DB	11	Jayden Smith	Sr
LB	13	Omari Frazier	So
CB	14	Jordan See	So
DB	16	Tommy Bowden	Jr
LB	19	Durand Hill	Fr
DB	20	Jackson Sennie	So
LB	23	Marc Gutierrez	Jr
DB	24	Courtney Patridge-Lee	Jr
LB	25	Mikkah Hackett (C)	Sr
CB	26	Tavion Page	Jr
LB	29	Lyndon Rangel	Fr
DB	30	Chaka Watson	So
DB	31	Logan Arnold	Fr
DE	32	E'Monte Smith	Sr
LB	33	Jacob Mueller	Sr
DB	35	Khyren Deal	Fr
LB	36	Mason Young	Fr
CB	37	Jamarcus Roberson	So
CB	38	Trashawn Adams	Fr
DB	39	Dorien Shannon	Jr
FS	40	Johnny Smith-Rider	Fr
FS	43	James Brinsley	Fr
DE	44	Trey Belyeu-Witcher	Fr
LB	45	Josh McDade	Fr
DE	47	Caleb Johnson	Sr
LB	50	Casey Buck	Fr
DE	51	Khevon Shepard	Sr
DT	52	Kobe Giles	So
DT	54	Tristan Green	So
DL	90	Josh Patteson	So
DE	93	Sante Parker Jr.	Sr
DT	94	Pete Smith	Sr
DT	99	Anthony Clayton	Jr
DT		Jorge Barrera	Jr
LB		Braegen Berry	So
DB		Austin Black	Jr
DT		Jeremy Carter	Fr
DT		Mason Cavness	Fr
DE		Omahri Daniels	Fr
LB		Chase Ellis	Fr
DE		Christian Gerlach	Fr
DE		Justin Gilliand	So
DE		Luke Gregory	So
CB		Braden Gunn	Fr
LB		Armani Ingram	Fr
DT		P. J. Jackson	Fr
LB		Carson Kaddatz	Jr
DE		Behnjamin Marin	Fr
LB		Parker Meza	Fr
DT		David Moore	So
DT		Xavier Morris	Fr
DT		Zachary Natt	So
LB		Jordan Owens	Fr
DB		Ethan Ramirez	Fr
LB		Laelen Reyes	Fr
DB		DeAndre Robb	Fr
DB		Kaleb Roberts	Fr
LB		Darien Shannon	Jr
LB		Kale Shaw	Fr
DL		Corey Simpson	Fr
CB		Emariyee Stewart	Fr
DT		Bo Stucker	Fr
LB		Aidan Thompson	Fr
DB		Airik Williams	Fr
DB		Kavion Williams	Fr
CB		Zay Woods	Fr
DB		Jermaine Wright	Fr

Special teams

Pos.	#	Name	Class
K, P	10	Anthony Avila	Sr
P	17	Kyle King (C)	Sr
K, P	85	Brandon Cunningham	Jr
K		Andrew Cunningham	Fr
K		Marcus Garza	Fr
K, P		Nico Ledesma	So
DS		Preston Sarlls	Fr
K		Garrett Stiles	Fr

Head coach

- Pete Fredenburg

Coordinators/assistant coaches

- Stephen Lee
  Offensive coordinator
- Larry Harmon
  Defensive coordinator
- Jack Johnson
  Special teams coordinator/Linebackers
- Bill Bleil
  Offensive line
- Nick Brace
  Defensive tackles
- Mark Carey
  Defensive line
- Steven Thrash
  Wide receivers
- Randy Smith
  Kickers/Punters/Long snappers

Legend

- (C) Team captain
- (S) Suspended
- (I) Ineligible
- Injured
- Redshirt

Roster
Last update: September 7, 2024
