= 2016 Mary Hardin–Baylor Crusaders football team =

American college football season

2016 Mary Hardin–Baylor Crusaders football

NCAA Division III champion (vacated)

Stagg Bowl, W 10–7 vs. Wisconsin–Oshkosh (vacated)
- Conference: American Southwest Conference

Ranking
- D3Football.com: No. 1
- Record: 2–0, 13 wins vacated (1–0 ASC, 5 wins vacated)
- Head coach: Pete Fredenburg (20th season)
- Offensive coordinator: Stephen Lee (2nd season)
- Offensive scheme: Pro-style
- Defensive coordinator: Larry Harmon (15th season)
- Base defense: 3–4
- Home stadium: Crusader Stadium

2016 American Southwest Conference football standings
| | Conf. | | | Overall |
| Team | W | | L | W | | L |
|---|---|---|---|---|---|---|
| No. 1 Mary Hardin–Baylor $^ | 6 | – | 0 | 15 | – | 0 |
| No. 13 Hardin–Simmons ^ | 5 | – | 1 | 9 | – | 2 |
| Sul Ross | 4 | – | 2 | 6 | – | 4 |
| East Texas Baptist | 3 | – | 3 | 7 | – | 3 |
| McMurry # | 2 | – | 4 | 4 | – | 5 |
| Louisiana College | 1 | – | 5 | 4 | – | 6 |
| Howard Payne | 0 | – | 6 | 0 | – | 10 |
| Belhaven * | | – | | 2 | – | 8 |
$ – Conference champion; ^ – NCAA Division III playoff participant; # – Provisional NCAA Division III member * – Provisional NCAA Division III member; games not counted in standings; Rankings from D3football.com

The 2016 Mary Hardin–Baylor Crusaders football team was an American football team that represented the University of Mary Hardin–Baylor in the American Southwest Conference (ASC) during the 2016 NCAA Division III football season. In their 20th year under head coach Pete Fredenburg, the team compiled a 15–0 record (6–0 against conference opponents) and won the ASC championship. The team advanced to the NCAA Division III playoffs and defeated Wisconsin–Oshkosh, 10–7, in the 2016 Stagg Bowl. As a result of rules violations self-reported by Mary Hardin–Baylor, the NCAA later vacated 13 of the team's victories and its national title.

The team played its home games at Crusader Stadium in Belton, Texas.

== Schedule ==
| Date | Opponent | Rank | Site | Result | Attendance | Source |
|---|---|---|---|---|---|---|
| September 3 | Ohio Wesleyan* | No. 5 | Crusader Stadium; Belton, TX | W 56–0 (vacated) | 3,066 | |
| September 10 | at Texas Lutheran* | No. 5 | Bulldog Stadium; Seguin, TX | W 56–21 (vacated) | 2,012 | |
| September 17 | No. 3 Linfield* | No. 5 | Crusader Stadium; Belton, TX | W 66–27 (vacated) | 6,990 | |
| October 1 | McMurry | No. 3 | Crusader Stadium; Belton, TX | W 80–7 (vacated) | 4,239 | |
| October 8 | at Howard Payne | No. 3 | Gordon Wood Stadium; Brownwood, TX | W 59–10 (vacated) | 2,230 | |
| October 15 | at No. 16 East Texas Baptist | No. 3 | Ornelas Stadium; Marshall, TX | W 59–22 (vacated) | 3,124 | |
| October 22 | No. 11 Hardin–Simmons | No. 3 | Crusader Stadium; Belton, TX | W 20–15 (vacated) | 5,665 | |
| October 29 | at Sul Ross | No. 3 | Jackson Field; Alpine, TX | W 59–10 (vacated) | 1,016 | |
| November 5 | at Belhaven* | No. 3 | Belhaven Bowl; Jackson, MS | W 59–21 | 475 | |
| November 12 | Louisiana College | No. 2 | Crusader Stadium; Belton, TX | W 63–7 | 3,409 | |
| November 19 | Redlands* | No. 1 | Crusader Stadium; Belton, TX (NCAA Division III first round) | W 50–28 (vacated) | 1,754 | |
| November 26 | No. 8 Linfield* | No. 1 | Crusader Stadium; Belton, TX (NCAA Division III second round) | W 27–10 (vacated) | 2,652 | |
| December 3 | No. 13 Wheaton (IL)* | No. 1 | Crusader Stadium; Belton, TX (NCAA Division III quarterfinal) | W 38–16 (vacated) | 1,985 | |
| December 10 | No. 7 Mount Union* | No. 1 | Crusader Stadium; Belton, TX (NCAA Division III semifinal) | W 14–12 (vacated) | 4,084 | |
| December 16 | vs. No. 4 Wisconsin–Oshkosh* | No. 1 | Salem Stadium; Salem, VA (Stagg Bowl) | W 10–7 (vacated) | 3,476 | |
*Non-conference game; Rankings from D3football.com Poll released prior to the game
