= 2021 Stagg Bowl =

NCAA Division III college football championship game

2021 NCAA Division III Football Championship
- Stagg Bowl XLVIII
North Central Cardinals	Mary Hardin–Baylor Crusaders
(13–0)	(14–0)
CCIW	ASC
24	57
Head coach: Jeff Thorne	Head coach: Pete Fredenburg
	1	2	3	4	Total
North Central	7	10	0	7	24
Mary Hardin–Baylor	16	3	14	24	57
- Date: December 17, 2021
- Season: 2021
- Stadium: Tom Benson Hall of Fame Stadium
- Location: Canton, Ohio
- Referee: Stuart Hindman (Centennial)
- Attendance: 1,830

United States TV coverage
- Network: ESPNU

The 2021 NCAA Division III Football Championship Game, more commonly referred to as the 2021 Stagg Bowl or Stagg Bowl XLVIII, is a postseason college football game that determined a national champion in NCAA Division III for the 2021 season. It was played at Tom Benson Hall of Fame Stadium in Canton, Ohio, on December 17, 2021. Kickoff was scheduled for 7:00 p.m. EST, and the game aired on ESPNU. The game featured the North Central Cardinals, from the College Conference of Illinois and Wisconsin, and the Mary Hardin–Baylor Crusaders, from the American Southwest Conference.

== Teams ==
The participants of the 2021 NCAA Division III Football Championship Game were the finalists of the 2021 Division III Playoffs, a 32-team single-elimination bracket. The game featured North Central, the defending national champions after winning the 2019 Stagg Bowl, and making their second title game appearance, and Mary Hardin–Baylor, seeking their second championship (their 2016 championship victory was later vacated) in their fifth title game appearance. This contest was the first between the two teams.

=== National semifinals ===
Semifinals; December 11; Hosted by team with asterisk
North Central	26
*	Mount Union	13
Mary Hardin–Baylor	24
*	Wisconsin–Whitewater	7

National Championship; December 17; Tom Benson Hall of Fame Stadium, Canton, OH
North Central	24
Mary Hardin–Baylor	57

== Game summary ==
2021 Stagg Bowl

Quarter	1	2	3	4	Total
Mary Hardin-Baylor	16	3	14	24	57
North Central	7	10	0	7	24

at Tom Benson Hall of Fame Stadium • Canton, Ohio

- Date: Friday, December 17, 2021
- Game time: 7:00 p.m. EST
- Game weather: Cloudy • Temperature: 38 °F (3 °C) • Wind: -->
- Game attendance: 1,830
- Referee: Stuart Hindman
- TV: ESPNU

Scoring summary

Quarter	Time	Drive			Team	Scoring information	Score	
Quarter	Time	Plays	Yards	TOP	Team	Scoring information	Mary Hardin-Baylor	North Central
1	14:48	0	0	0:12	North Central	93 Yard Kickoff Return Touchdown by DeAngelo Hardy, Tanner Rains Kick Good	0	7
1	11:51	6	62	2:53	Mary Hardin-Baylor	32-yard field goal by Brandon Cunningham	3	7
1	9:39	3	25	0:47	Mary Hardin-Baylor	Brandon Jordan 19-yard touchdown reception from Kyle King, Brandon Cunningham kick blocked	9	7
1	2:14	6	83	3:04	Mary Hardin-Baylor	K.J. Miller 19-yard touchdown reception from Kyle King, Brandon Cunningham kick good	16	7
2	5:32	14	90	6:58	North Central	Ethan Greenfield 1-yard touchdown run, Tanner Rains kick good	16	14
2	2:05	6	39	2:35	North Central	22-yard field goal by Tanner Rains	16	17
2	0:00	8	56	1:58	Mary Hardin-Baylor	22-yard field goal by Brandon Cunningham	19	17
3	9:39	12	81	5:13	Mary Hardin-Baylor	Aphonso Thomas 15-yard touchdown run, Brandon Cunningham kick good	26	17
3	1:31	10	91	4:55	Mary Hardin-Baylor	Aphonso Thomas 3-yard touchdown run, Brandon Cunningham kick good	33	17
4	14:49	4	1	0:53	Mary Hardin-Baylor	20-yard field goal by Brandon Cunningham	36	17
4	10:10	5	46	2:09	Mary Hardin-Baylor	Kenneth Cormier 11-yard touchdown run, Brandon Cunningham kick good	43	17
4	7:47	7	71	2:19	North Central	Blake Williams 30-yard touchdown reception from Luke Lehnen, Tanner Rains kick good	43	24
4	6:01	3	44	1:44	Mary Hardin-Baylor	Aaron Sims 37-yard touchdown reception from Kyle King, Brandon Cunningham kick good	50	24
4	0:42	6	53	3:16	Mary Hardin-Baylor	Brenton Martin 17-yard touchdown reception from Ryan Redding, Brandon Cunningham kick good	57	24
"TOP" = time of possession. For other American football terms, see Glossary of American football.							57	24

=== Statistics ===
Statistics	NCC	UMHB
First downs	18	28
Plays–yards	61-287	65-596
Rushes–yards	34-85	32-133
Passing yards	202	463
Passing: Comp–Att–Int	18-27-3	24-33-0
Time of possession	28:48	31:12

Team	Category	Player	Statistics
North Central	Passing	Luke Lehnen	18-27, 202 yards, 1 TD, 3 INT
North Central	Rushing	Ethan Greenfield	25 carries, 124 yards, 1 TD
North Central	Receiving	Andrew Kamienski	8 receptions, 115 yards
Mary Hardin–Baylor	Passing	Kyle King	22-29, 436 yards, 3 TD
Mary Hardin–Baylor	Rushing	Aphonso Thomas	13 carries, 65 yards, 2 TD
Mary Hardin–Baylor	Receiving	Brenton Martin	9 receptions, 170 yards, 1 TD
