= 2021 Sul Ross Lobos football team =

American college football season

2021 Sul Ross Lobos football
- Conference: American Southwest Conference
- Record: 2–7 (2–7 ASC)
- Head coach: John Pearce (8th season)
- Offensive coordinator: Barry Derickson (1st season)
- Offensive scheme: Air raid
- Defensive coordinator: Eric Eisenberg (1st season)
- Base defense: 3–4 captain =
- Home stadium: Jackson Field

2021 American Southwest Conference football standings
	Conf.			Overall
Team	W		L	W		L
No. 1 Mary Hardin–Baylor $^	9	–	0	15	–	0
No. 10 Hardin–Simmons	8	–	1	9	–	1
Belhaven	6	–	3	7	–	3
Howard Payne	6	–	3	7	–	3
East Texas Baptist	4	–	5	5	–	5
Southwestern (TX)	4	–	5	4	–	6
Texas Lutheran	3	–	6	3	–	7
McMurry	2	–	7	2	–	7
Sul Ross	2	–	7	2	–	7
Austin	1	–	8	1	–	8
$ – Conference champion; ^ – NCAA Division III playoff participant; Rankings from AFCA Poll

The 2021 Sul Ross Lobos football team represented Sul Ross State University during the 2021 NCAA Division II football season as a member of the American Southwest Conference (ASC). The Lobos were led by eighth-year head coach John Pearce and played their home hames at Jackson Field in Alpine, Texas. The team finished with a record of 2–7 to finish ninth in the ASC. The Lobos struggled on both sides of the ball throughout the season, with the offense getting shutout twice and the defense allowing 70+ points in two different games.

On November 30, just two weeks after the Lobos' season finale, Pearce announced that he would be resigning as the program's head coach. That same day it was announced that offensive coordinator Barry Derickson had been promoted to interim head coach.

== Schedule ==
Date	Time	Opponent	Site	Result	Attendance
September 11	4:00 p.m.	No. 7 Hardin–Simmons	Jackson Field; Alpine, TX	L 0–27	0
September 18	1:00 p.m.	at Austin	Apple Stadium; Sherman, TX	L 7–16	898
September 25	4:00 p.m.	Texas Lutheran	Jackson Field; Alpine, TX	W 12–10	590
October 2	1:30 p.m.	at Howard Payne	Gordon Wood Stadium; Brownwood, TX	L 30–73	2,250
October 16	12:00 p.m.	at Belhaven	Belhaven Bowl; Jackson, MS	L 0–44	300
October 23	12:00 p.m.	No. 2 Mary Hardin–Baylor	Jackson Field; Alpine, TX	L 14–72	0
October 30	1:00 p.m.	at McMurry	Wilfred Moore Stadium; Abilene, TX (Battle of I-20)	W 24–11	1,123
November 6	12:00 p.m.	East Texas Baptist	Jackson Field; Alpine, TX	L 28–31	0
November 13	1:00 p.m.	at Southwestern (TX)	Bernard Birkelbach Field; Georgetown, TX	L 15–49	1,500
Rankings from D3Football.com Poll released prior to the game; All times are in Central time

- On October 9, the Lobos hosted an exhibition game against the North American Stallions for homecoming. The Lobos lost 37–44, though the game did not count in official standings.

== Offseason ==
=== Coaching changes ===
On July 24, 2021, the university announced that offensive coordinator Kevin Canty died at the age of 37 due to complications from COVID-19. Valparaiso tight ends coach Barry Derickson was named the Lobos' new offensive coordinator.

Due to Canty's death and several positive COVID cases within the program, Sul Ross State announced that the football program would be suspending summer practices.

== Preseason ==
=== ASC media poll ===
In the ASC preseason media poll, the Lobos were predicted to finish last out of ten teams in the conference.

== Game summaries ==
=== No. 7 Hardin–Simmons ===
No. 7 Hardin–Simmons Cowboys at Sul Ross Lobos – Game summary

Quarter	1	2	3	4	Total
No. 7 Cowboys	7	3	10	7	27
Lobos	0	0	0	0	0

at Jackson Field, Alpine, Texas

- Date: September 11
- Game time: 4:00 p.m. CDT
- Game weather: Sunny, 87 °F (31 °C)
- Game attendance: 0
- Box score, Recap

Game information
First quarter
- HSU – Jonathan Castaneda 6-yard run (Jamie Pogue kick), 8:26. Cowboys 7–0. Drive: 13 plays, 92 yards, 4:46.

Second quarter

- HSU – Jamie Pogue 34-yard field goal, 5:32. Cowboys 10–0. Drive: 8 plays, 38 yards, 3:06.

Third quarter

- HSU – Jamie Pogue 20-yard field goal, 6:28. Cowboys 13–0. Drive: 10 plays, 77 yards, 5:31.
- HSU – Jayden Coleman 8-yard pass from Kyle Jones (Jamie Pogue kick), 0:00. Cowboys 20–0. Drive: 8 plays, 60 yards, 3:22.

Fourth quarter

- HSU – Kai Brinkerhoff 30-yard pass from Kyle Jones (Jamie Pogue kick), 5:10. Cowboys 27–0. Drive: 4 plays, 45 yards, 1:55.

Statistics	HSU	SRS
First downs	29	9
Total yards	483	164
Rushing yards	187	46
Passing yards	296	118
Turnovers	1	0
Time of possession	31:44	28:16

Team	Category	Player	Statistics
Hardin–Simmons	Passing	Kyle Jones	30/44, 292 yards, 2 TD, INT
Hardin–Simmons	Rushing	Colton Marshall	13 rushes, 106 yards
Hardin–Simmons	Receiving	Cale Nanny	5 receptions, 67 yards
Sul Ross	Passing	T. J. Deshields	17/25, 106 yards
Sul Ross	Rushing	Matthew DeLeon	10 rushes, 34 yards
Sul Ross	Receiving	Vicente Luevano	6 receptions, 50 yards

=== At Austin ===
Sul Ross Lobos at Austin Kangaroos – Game summary

Quarter	1	2	3	4	Total
Lobos	0	7	0	0	7
Kangaroos	10	0	3	3	16

at Apple Stadium, Sherman, Texas

- Date: September 18
- Game time: 1:00 p.m. CDT
- Game attendance: 898
- Box score, Recap

Game information
First quarter
- AC – John Aldridge 31-yard field goal, 10:17. Kangaroos 3–0. Drive: 5 plays, 20 yards, 2:15.
- AC – Aaron Rideaux 26-yard pass from Tyler James (John Aldridge kick), 4:19. Kangaroos 10–0. Drive: 9 plays, 79 yards, 3:06.

Second quarter

- SRS – Matthew DeLeon 3-yard run (Jaden Brown kick), 1:34. Kangaroos 10–7. Drive: 7 plays, 43 yards, 2:58.

Third quarter

- AC – John Aldridge 19-yard field goal, 1:22. Kangaroos 13–7. Drive: 9 plays, 55 yards, 3:58.

Fourth quarter

- AC – John Aldridge 22-yard field goal, 7:49. Kangaroos 16–7. Drive: 9 plays, 46 yards, 4:51.

Statistics	SRS	AC
First downs	12	23
Total yards	157	341
Rushing yards	83	167
Passing yards	74	174
Turnovers	0	1
Time of possession	25:00	35:00

Team	Category	Player	Statistics
Sul Ross	Passing	T. J. Deshields	7/14, 58 yards
Sul Ross	Rushing	Matthew DeLeon	16 rushes, 71 yards, TD
Sul Ross	Receiving	Dre'Chan Moody	2 receptions, 43 yards
Austin	Passing	Tyler James	16/30, 174 yards, TD
Austin	Rushing	Makkedah Brown	13 rushes, 54 yards
Austin	Receiving	Xavier Maxwell	5 receptions, 72 yards

=== Texas Lutheran ===
Texas Lutheran Bulldogs at Sul Ross Lobos – Game summary

Quarter	1	2	3	4	Total
Bulldogs	0	0	0	10	10
Lobos	0	3	0	9	12

at Jackson Field, Alpine, Texas

- Date: September 25
- Game time: 4:00 p.m. CDT
- Game weather: Sunny, 82 °F (28 °C)
- Game attendance: 590
- Referee: Esrael Silva
- Box score, Recap

Game information
First quarter
- No scoring plays

Second quarter

- SRS – Jaden Brown 35-yard field goal, 14:56. Lobos 3–0. Drive: 4 plays, 7 yards, 3:29.

Third quarter

- No scoring plays

Fourth quarter

- SRS – Jaden Brown 25-yard field goal, 14:41. Lobos 6–0. Drive: 17 plays, 69 yards, 8:31.
- TLU – Jacob Forton 23-yard run (Juan Ocampo kick), 9:32. Bulldogs 7–6. Drive: 11 plays, 70 yards, 5:01.
- TLU – Juan Ocampo 30-yard field goal, 5:10. Bulldogs 10–6. Drive: 7 plays, 22 yards, 3:40.
- SRS – Isaiah Villarreal 10-yard pass from T. J. Deshields (pass failed), 0:04. Lobos 12–10. Drive: 16 plays, 87 yards, 5:04.

Statistics	TLU	SRS
First downs	15	20
Total yards	247	307
Rushing yards	165	85
Passing yards	82	222
Turnovers	4	1
Time of possession	27:16	32:44

Team	Category	Player	Statistics
Texas Lutheran	Passing	Seth Cosme	7/10, 82 yards
Texas Lutheran	Rushing	Jacob Forton	15 rushes, 99 yards, TD
Texas Lutheran	Receiving	DaKory Willis	2 receptions, 39 yards
Sul Ross	Passing	T. J. Deshields	25/40, 222 yards, TD, INT
Sul Ross	Rushing	Devon Mendoza	17 rushes, 79 yards
Sul Ross	Receiving	Vicente Luevano	7 receptions, 60 yards

=== At Howard Payne ===
Sul Ross Lobos at Howard Payne Yellow Jackets – Game summary

Quarter	1	2	3	4	Total
Lobos	3	7	7	13	30
Yellow Jackets	17	28	14	14	73

at Gordon Wood Stadium, Brownwood, Texas

- Date: October 2
- Game time: 1:30 p.m. CDT
- Game weather: Sunny, 82 °F (28 °C)
- Game attendance: 2,250
- Referee: Kenny Kelarek
- Box score, Recap

Game information
First quarter
- HPU – Blake Phipps 22-yard field goal, 12:43. Yellow Jackets 3–0. Drive: 10 plays, 65 yards, 2:12.
- SRS – Jaden Brown 42-yard field goal, 6:54. Tied 3–3. Drive: 9 plays, 40 yards, 2:58.
- HPU – Otis Lanier 31-yard pass from Landon McKinney (Blake Phipps kick), 4:24. Yellow Jackets 10–3. Drive: 14 plays, 77 yards, 2:27.
- HPU – Max McCuiston 41-yard pass from Landon McKinney (Blake Phipps kick), 1:26. Yellow Jackets 17–3. Drive: 4 plays, 55 yards, 1:22.

Second quarter

- HPU – Quentin Gray 39-yard pass from Landon McKinney (Blake Phipps kick), 11:21. Yellow Jackets 24–3. Drive: 3 plays, 55 yards, 0:40.
- SRS – Vicente Luevano 8-yard pass from T. J. Deshields (Jaden Brown kick), 6:44. Yellow Jackets 24–10. Drive: 11 plays, 65 yards, 4:37.
- HPU – Jake Parker 10-yard pass from Landon McKinney (Blake Phipps kick), 5:20. Yellow Jackets 31–10. Drive: 6 plays, 60 yards, 1:17.
- HPU – Hunter Cheek 27-yard pass from Landon McKinney (Blake Phipps kick), 3:15. Yellow Jackets 38–10. Drive: 1 play, 27 yards, 0:10.
- HPU – Jake Parker 83-yard punt return (Blake Phipps kick), 1:56. Yellow Jackets 45–10.

Third quarter

- SRS – Devon Mendoza 8-yard pass from T. J. Deshields (Jaden Brown kick), 8:32. Yellow Jackets 45–17. Drive: 9 plays, 75 yards, 2:32.
- HPU – Landon McKinney 11-yard run (Blake Phipps kick), 6:57. Yellow Jackets 52–17. Drive: 5 plays, 66 yards, 1:35.
- HPU – Casey Dufner 13-yard pass from Landon McKinney (Blake Phipps kick), 2:01. Yellow Jackets 59–17. Drive: 9 plays, 48 yards, 3:59.

Fourth quarter

- HPU – Javonte Russell 11-yard pass from Nick Infante (Blake Phipps kick), 10:26. Yellow Jackets 66–17. Drive: 11 plays, 35 yards, 4:24.
- SRS – Buddy Santos 25-yard pass from Jordan Curtis (Jaden Brown kick), 4:37. Yellow Jackets 66–24. Drive: 8 plays, 59 yards, 1:49.
- HPU – Jeremiah Milton 1-yard run (Blake Phipps kick), 0:52. Yellow Jackets 73–24. Drive: 10 plays, 56 yards, 3:45.
- SRS – Terran Limuel 85-yard kickoff return (run failed), 0:36. Yellow Jackets 73–30.

Statistics	SRS	HPU
First downs	20	29
Total yards	326	559
Rushing yards	86	164
Passing yards	240	395
Turnovers	0	1
Time of possession	31:25	28:35

Team	Category	Player	Statistics
Sul Ross	Passing	T. J. Deshields	26/38, 213 yards, 2 TD
Sul Ross	Rushing	Kendrick Jefferson	13 rushes, 58 yards
Sul Ross	Receiving	Vicente Luevano	13 receptions, 118 yards, TD
Howard Payne	Passing	Landon McKinney	17/30, 335 yards, 6 TD, INT
Howard Payne	Rushing	Tauren Bradley	12 rushes, 61 yards
Howard Payne	Receiving	Otis Lanier	3 receptions, 98 yards, TD

=== At Belhaven ===
Sul Ross Lobos at Belhaven Blazers – Game summary

Quarter	1	2	3	4	Total
Lobos	0	0	0	0	0
Blazers	10	21	13	0	44

at Belhaven Bowl, Jackson, Mississippi

- Date: October 16
- Game time: 12:00 p.m. CDT
- Game weather: Sunny, 70 °F (21 °C)
- Game attendance: 300
- Referee: Arthur Black
- Box score, Recap

Game information
First quarter
- BEL – Cooper Tullo 17-yard pass from Mayowa Asagunla (Constantine Hontzas kick), 8:48. Blazers 7–0. Drive: 6 plays, 28 yards, 2:32.
- BEL – Constantine Hontzas 30-yard field goal, 3:06. Blazers 10–0. Drive: 8 plays, 25 yards, 4:09.

Second quarter

- BEL – Kolbe Blunt 1-yard run (Constantine Hontzas kick), 14:32. Blazers 17–0. Drive: 4 plays, 94 yards, 1:20.
- BEL – Mayowa Asagunla 8-yard run (Constantine Hontzas kick), 6:52. Blazers 24–0. Drive: 3 plays, 35 yards, 1:17.
- BEL – Mayowa Asagunla 5-yard run (Constantine Hontzas kick), 0:35. Blazers 31–0. Drive: 8 plays, 52 yards, 4:02.

Third quarter

- BEL – Brad Foley 2-yard run (kick blocked), 11:20. Blazers 37–0. Drive: 6 plays, 45 yards, 3:30.
- BEL – Kolbe Blunt 3-yard run (Constantine Hontzas kick), 4:36. Blazers 44–0. Drive: 9 plays, 44 yards, 5:47.

Fourth quarter

- No scoring plays

Statistics	SRS	BEL
First downs	7	24
Total yards	114	446
Rushing yards	35	332
Passing yards	79	114
Turnovers	2	0
Time of possession	22:32	37:28

Team	Category	Player	Statistics
Sul Ross	Passing	T. J. Deshields	9/14, 79 yards
Sul Ross	Rushing	Ozias Wright	5 rushes, 32 yards
Sul Ross	Receiving	Vicente Luevano	2 receptions, 36 yards
Belhaven	Passing	Mayowa Asagunla	9/13, 57 yards, TD
Belhaven	Rushing	Kolbe Blunt	10 rushes, 117 yards, 2 TD
Belhaven	Receiving	Ras Pace	2 receptions, 35 yards

=== No. 2 Mary Hardin–Baylor ===
No. 2 Mary Hardin–Baylor Crusaders at Sul Ross Lobos – Game summary

Quarter	1	2	3	4	Total
No. 2 Crusaders	7	31	14	20	72
Lobos	0	7	7	0	14

at Jackson Field, Alpine, Texas

- Date: October 23
- Game time: 12:00 p.m. CDT
- Game weather: Sunny, 74 °F (23 °C)
- Game attendance: 0
- Referee: Jeff Bell
- Box score, Recap

Game information
First quarter
- MHB – Kyle King 2-yard run (Anthony Avila kick), 5:32. Crusaders 7–0. Drive: 4 plays, 40 yards, 2:01.

Second quarter

- MHB – K. J. Miller 88-yard punt return (Anthony Avila kick), 12:58. Crusaders 14–0.
- MHB – Anthony Avila 35-yard field goal, 11:28. Crusaders 17–0. Drive: 4 plays, 0 yards, 1:12.
- SRS – Vicente Luevano 52-yard pass from T. J. Deshields (Jaden Brown kick), 7:24. Crusaders 17–7. Drive: 1 play, 52 yards, 0:08.
- MHB – Aphonso Thomas 1-yard run (Anthony Avila kick), 3:59. Crusaders 24–7. Drive: 7 plays, 55 yards, 3:19.
- MHB – K. J. Miller 14-yard pass from Kyle King (Anthony Avila kick), 1:15. Crusaders 31–7. Drive: 5 plays, 50 yards, 2:14.
- MHB – Brandon Jordan 40-yard pass from Kyle King (Anthony Avila kick), 0:41. Crusaders 38–7. Drive: 1 play, 40 yards, 0:07.

Third quarter

- SRS – Ozias Wright 80-yard pass from T. J. Deshields (Jaden Brown kick), 12:51. Crusaders 38–14. Drive: 1 play, 80 yards, 0:13.
- MHB – Brenton Martin 30-yard pass from Kyle King (Anthony Avila kick), 10:10. Crusaders 45–14. Drive: 7 plays, 55 yards, 2:41.
- MHB – Connor Mullins 12-yard pass from Ryan Redding (Anthony Avila kick), 5:27. Crusaders 52–14. Drive: 7 plays, 47 yards, 3:33.

Fourth quarter

- MHB – Ryan Redding 14-yard run (Anthony Avila kick), 14:44. Crusaders 59–14. Drive: 7 plays, 58 yards, 3:27.
- MHB – Brenton Martin 55-yard pass from Ryan Redding (kick failed), 11:45. Crusaders 65–14. Drive: 3 plays, 55 yards, 1:15.
- MHB – Aaron Sims 68-yard pass from Ryan Redding (Anthony Avila kick), 6:12. Crusaders 72–14. Drive: 3 plays, 70 yards, 2:02.

Statistics	MHB	SRS
First downs	26	7
Total yards	573	219
Rushing yards	208	42
Passing yards	365	177
Turnovers	2	2
Time of possession	20:58	39:02

Team	Category	Player	Statistics
Mary Hardin–Baylor	Passing	Ryan Redding	10/13, 201 yards, 3 TD
Mary Hardin–Baylor	Rushing	Aphonso Thomas	14 rushes, 86 yards, TD
Mary Hardin–Baylor	Receiving	Benton Martin	5 receptions, 106 yards, 2 TD
Sul Ross	Passing	T. J. Deshields	5/16, 173 yards, 2 TD, INT
Sul Ross	Rushing	Ozias Wright	12 rushes, 20 yards
Sul Ross	Receiving	Vicente Luevano	2 receptions, 85 yards, TD

=== At McMurry ===
Sul Ross Lobos at McMurry War Hawks – Game summary

Quarter	1	2	3	4	Total
Lobos	7	0	7	10	24
War Hawks	8	3	0	0	11

at Wilfred Moore Stadium, Abilene, Texas

- Date: October 30
- Game time: 1:00 p.m. CDT
- Game weather: Sunny, 73 °F (23 °C)
- Game attendance: 1,123
- Referee: Jason Hickey
- Box score, Recap

Game information
First quarter
- MCM – Dee Robinson 1-yard run (Dexter Wyble pass to Dee Robinson), 11:51. War Hawks 8–0. Drive: 9 plays, 75 yards, 3:09.
- SRS – Kendrick Jefferson 18-yard pass from T. J. Deshields (Jaden Brown kick), 3:50. War Hawks 8–7. Drive: 10 plays, 60 yards, 5:03.

Second quarter

- MCM – Jared Mendoza 22-yard field goal, 13:30. War Hawks 11–7. Drive: 12 plays, 70 yards, 1:30.

Third quarter

- SRS – Clayton Maxwell 1-yard run (Jaden Brown kick), 4:34. Lobos 14–11. Drive: 4 plays, 15 yards, 1:46.

Fourth quarter

- SRS – Vicente Luevano 23-yard pass from T. J. Deshields (Jaden Brown kick), 8:18. Lobos 21–11. Drive: 7 plays, 48 yards, 3:25.
- SRS – Jaden Brown 33-yard field goal, 1:58. Lobos 24–11. Drive: 6 plays, 23 yards, 3:38.

Statistics	SRS	MCM
First downs	23	21
Total yards	360	285
Rushing yards	174	133
Passing yards	186	152
Turnovers	3	3
Time of possession	34:00	22:10

Team	Category	Player	Statistics
Sul Ross	Passing	T. J. Deshields	19/32, 186 yards, 2 TD, 2 INT
Sul Ross	Rushing	Ozias Wright	17 rushes, 89 yards
Sul Ross	Receiving	Austin Remo	3 receptions, 44 yards
McMurry	Passing	Dexter Wyble	12/22, 152 yards, 2 INT
McMurry	Rushing	Kameron Session	17 rushes, 83 yards
McMurry	Receiving	Zachary Wood	3 receptions, 64 yards

=== East Texas Baptist ===
East Texas Baptist Tigers at Sul Ross Lobos – Game summary

Quarter	1	2	3	4	Total
Tigers	14	7	7	3	31
Lobos	7	0	14	7	28

at Jackson Field, Alpine, Texas

- Date: November 6
- Game time: 12:00 p.m. CDT
- Game weather: Sunny
- Game attendance: 0
- Box score, Recap

Game information
First quarter
- SRS – Vicente Luevano 79-yard pass from T. J. Deshields (Jaden Brown kick), 9:12. Lobos 7–0. Drive: 1 play, 79 yards, 0:14.
- ETB – Jaden Thomas 2-yard run (Alberto Garcia kick), 7:41. Tied 7–7. Drive: 3 plays, 25 yards, 1:16.
- ETB – Alek Child 16-yard run (Alberto Garcia kick), 0:21. Tigers 14–7. Drive: 10 plays, 55 yards, 3:21.

Second quarter

- ETB – Alek Child 4-yard run (Alberto Garcia kick), 13:34. Tigers 21–7. Drive: 2 plays, 34 yards, 0:39.

Third quarter

- SRS – Ozias Wright 42-yard run (Jaden Brown kick), 10:07. Tigers 21–14. Drive: 2 plays, 42 yards, 0:30.
- SRS – Clayton Maxwell 5-yard run (Jaden Brown kick), 8:11. Tied 21–21. Drive: 4 plays, 15 yards, 1:50.
- ETB – Alek Child 3-yard run (Alberto Garcia kick), 1:33. Tigers 28–21. Drive: 16 plays, 75 yards, 6:38.

Fourth quarter

- ETB – Alberto Garcia 33-yard field goal, 6:20. Tigers 31–21. Drive: 9 plays, 35 yards, 4:44.
- SRS – Isaiah Villarreal 3-yard pass from Clayton Maxwell (Jaden Brown kick), 2:41. Tigers 31–28. Drive: 7 plays, 75 yards, 3:39.

Statistics	ETB	SRS
First downs	22	13
Total yards	369	396
Rushing yards	212	86
Passing yards	157	310
Turnovers	2	4
Time of possession	34:04	25:56

Team	Category	Player	Statistics
East Texas Baptist	Passing	Alek Child	8/16, 152 yards
East Texas Baptist	Rushing	Jaden Thomas	17 rushes, 120 yards, TD
East Texas Baptist	Receiving	Tariq Gray	4 receptions, 69 yards
Sul Ross	Passing	T. J. Deshields	11/30, 234 yards, TD, INT
Sul Ross	Rushing	Ozias Wright	14 rushes, 88 yards, TD
Sul Ross	Receiving	Vicente Luevano	6 receptions, 165 yards, TD

=== At Southwestern (TX) ===
Sul Ross Lobos at Southwestern Pirates – Game summary

Quarter	1	2	3	4	Total
Lobos	0	9	6	0	15
Pirates	7	21	21	0	49

at Bernard Birkelbach Field, Georgetown, Texas

- Date: November 13
- Game time: 1:00 p.m. CST
- Game weather: Sunny, 64 °F (18 °C)
- Game attendance: 1,500
- Referee: Robert Newton
- Box score, Recap

Game information
First quarter
- SW – Landry Gilpin 63-yard run (Wil Herbst kick), 13:35. Pirates 7–0. Drive: 4 plays, 76 yards, 1:19.

Second quarter

- SW – Ethan Powell 12-yard pass from Landry Gilpin (Wil Herbst kick), 12:11. Pirates 14–0. Drive: 13 plays, 73 yards, 6:17.
- SRS – Kamer Gonzalez 19-yard pass from Clayton Maxwell (Jaden Brown kick), 8:54. Pirates 14–7. Drive: 7 plays, 75 yards, 3:17.
- SW – Eric Ovalle 25-yard pass from Landry Gilpin (Wil Herbst kick), 7:48. Pirates 21–7. Drive: 4 plays, 65 yards, 1:05.
- SW – Brandon Jennings 3-yard pass from Landry Gilpin (Wil Herbst kick), 3:10. Pirates 28–7. Drive: 8 plays, 36 yards, 3:46.
- SRS – Brandon Jennings tackled in own end zone, 0:18. Pirates 28–9.

Third quarter

- SRS – Vicente Luevano 38-yard pass from Clayton Maxwell (pass failed), 5:43. Pirates 28–15. Drive: 4 plays, 65 yards, 1:48.
- SW – Eric Ovalle 12-yard pass from Landry Gilpin (Wil Herbst kick), 2:34. Pirates 35–15. Drive: 9 plays, 65 yards, 3:09.
- SW – Jaquon Marion 20-yard run (Wil Herbst kick), 1:36. Pirates 42–15. Drive: 2 plays, 13 yards, 0:52.
- SW – Dugan Sexton 30-yard pass from Landry Gilpin (Wil Herbst kick), 0:36. Pirates 49–15. Drive: 1 play, 45 yards, 0:07.

Fourth quarter

- No scoring plays

Statistics	SRS	SW
First downs	22	26
Total yards	444	441
Rushing yards	104	226
Passing yards	340	215
Turnovers	6	1
Time of possession	31:16	28:44

Team	Category	Player	Statistics
Sul Ross	Passing	Clayton Maxwell	28/43, 340 yards, 2 TD, 2 INT
Sul Ross	Rushing	Ozias Wright	13 rushes, 59 yards
Sul Ross	Receiving	Vicente Luevano	8 receptions, 115 yards, TD
Southwestern	Passing	Landry Gilpin	18/25, 207 yards, 5 TD, INT
Southwestern	Rushing	Landry Gilpin	9 rushes, 89 yards, TD
Southwestern	Receiving	Eric Ovalle	5 receptions, 69 yards, 2 TD
