= Pete Fredenburg =

American football player and coach (born 1949)

Biographical details
- Born: September 15, 1949 (age 77)

Playing career
- 1968–1970: Southwest Texas State

Coaching career (HC unless noted)
- 1971–1976: New Braunfels HS (TX) (assistant)
- 1977: Canyon HS (TX) (assistant)
- 1978–1979: Giddings HS (TX)
- 1980–1982: Baylor (DL)
- 1983–1984: Baylor (DC/DL)
- 1985–1989: Baylor (DC)
- 1990–1991: Baylor (DC/DT)
- 1992: Baylor (AHC/DT)
- 1993: Baylor (AHC/DC)
- 1994: LSU (DT)
- 1995–1996: Louisiana Tech (DC)
- 1998–2021: Mary Hardin–Baylor

Head coaching record
- Overall: 231–39 (college) (Note: In June 2020, Mary Hardin–Baylor vacated a total of 26 wins and 1 loss from the 2016 and 2017 seasons. The Crusaders finished the 2016 season with an overall record 15–0 and a conference mark of 6–0. 13 wins, including 5 conference wins and 5 wins in the NCAA Division III playoffs, and the NCAA Division III title from the 2016 season were vacated. Mary Hardin–Baylor finished the 2017 season with an overall record of 14–1 with a conference mark of 9–0. 13 wins and 1 loss, including 8 conference wins and 4 wins and 1 loss in the NCAA Division III playoffs from the 2017 season were vacated.)
- Tournaments: 39–15 (NCAA D-III playoffs)

Accomplishments and honors

Championships
- 2 NCAA Division III (2018, 2021); 19 ASC (2002–2003, 2005–2021)

Awards
- Liberty Mutual Coach of the Year Award (2013); AFCA NCAA Division III COY (2016); Texas Sports Hall of Fame (2018); D3football.com National Coach of the Year (2021)

Pete Fredenburg (born September 15, 1949) is an American former football coach. He served as the head football coach at University of Mary Hardin–Baylor in Belton, Texas from the program's inception in 1997 until his retirement following the 2021 season; the program began play in 1998. Fredenburg led Mary Hardin–Baylor to three NCAA Division III Football Championship titles, in 2016, 2018, and 2021. The 2016 title later was later vacated. His 2004 squad finished as NCAA Division III runner-up, losing to Linfield. Before coming to Mary Hardin–Baylor, Fredenburg served as an assistant coach at Baylor University (1982–1993), Louisiana State University (1994), and Louisiana Tech University (1995–1996). He played college football at Southwest Texas State University—now known as Texas State University—from 1968 to 1970.

Fredenburg announced his retirement on January 7, 2022.

== Head coaching record ==
=== College ===
Year	Team	Overall	Conference	Standing	Bowl/playoffs	D3^{#}
Mary Hardin–Baylor Crusaders (American Southwest Conference) (1998–2021)
1998	Mary Hardin–Baylor	3–7	2–5	T–5th		
1999	Mary Hardin–Baylor	4–6	3–4	T–4th		
2000	Mary Hardin–Baylor	9–1	8–1	2nd		
2001	Mary Hardin–Baylor	8–2	7–1	2nd	L NCAA Division III First Round	
2002	Mary Hardin–Baylor	10–1	9–0	1st	L NCAA Division III First Round	
2003	Mary Hardin–Baylor	9–1	8–1	T–1st		15
2004	Mary Hardin–Baylor	13–2	8–1	2nd	L NCAA Division III Championship	2
2005	Mary Hardin–Baylor	9–2	7–1	1st	L NCAA Division III Second Round	11
2006	Mary Hardin–Baylor	10–3	8–0	1st	L NCAA Division III Quarterfinal	8
2007	Mary Hardin–Baylor	12–2	8–0	1st	L NCAA Division III Semifinal	3
2008	Mary Hardin–Baylor	12–2	8–0	1st	L NCAA Division III Semifinal	3
2009	Mary Hardin–Baylor	10–2	7–1	T–1st	L NCAA Division III Second Round	7
2010	Mary Hardin–Baylor	12–1	8–0	1st	L NCAA Division III Quarterfinal	5
2011	Mary Hardin–Baylor	12–1	8–0	1st	L NCAA Division III Quarterfinal	5
2012	Mary Hardin–Baylor	13–1	7–0	1st	L NCAA Division III Semifinal	5
2013	Mary Hardin–Baylor	13–1	6–0	1st	L NCAA Division III Semifinal	2
2014	Mary Hardin–Baylor	11–1	5–0	1st	L NCAA Division III Second Round	6
2015	Mary Hardin–Baylor	11–2	4–1	T–1st	L NCAA Division III Quarterfinal	7
2016	Mary Hardin–Baylor	2–0	1–0	1st	W (vacated) NCAA Division III Championship	1
2017	Mary Hardin–Baylor	1–0	1–0	1st	L (vacated) NCAA Division III Championship	2
2018	Mary Hardin–Baylor	15–0	9–0	1st	W NCAA Division III Championship	1
2019	Mary Hardin–Baylor	12–1	9–0	1st	L NCAA Division III Quarterfinal	6
2020–21	Mary Hardin–Baylor	5–0	4–0	1st (East)		
2021	Mary Hardin–Baylor	15–0	9–0	1st	W NCAA Division III Championship	1
Mary Hardin–Baylor:		231–39	154–16			
Total:		231–39				
National championship Conference title Conference division title or championship game berth

== See also ==
- List of college football career coaching winning percentage leaders
- List of college football career coaching wins leaders
