= Stephen Lee (American football) =

American football coach (born c. 1971)

Current position
- Title: Offensive coordinator
- Team: Mary Hardin–Baylor
- Conference: ASC

Biographical details
- Born: c. 1971 (age 54–55); Bronte, Texas, U.S.
- Education: Angelo State University (1993)

Playing career
- 1989–1992: Angelo State
- Positions: Quarterback, fullback

Coaching career (HC unless noted)
- 1996–1997: Irion County HS (TX) (OL)
- 1998: Irion County HS (TX)
- 1999: Western New Mexico (GA/ST/OL)
- 2000–2002: Howard Payne (RB/TE)
- 2003–2004: Howard Payne (DL)
- 2005–2010: Brenham HS (TX) (co-OC/QB/WR/TE)
- 2011: West Texas A&M (QB)
- 2012–2015: West Texas A&M (OC/QB)
- 2016–2021: Mary Hardin–Baylor (OC)
- 2022: Abilene Christian (OC)
- 2023: Cisco
- 2024: Tarleton State (TE)
- 2025–present: Mary Hardin–Baylor (OC)

Administrative career (AD unless noted)
- ?–1999: Irion County HS (TX)

Head coaching record
- Overall: 4–4 (junior college); 7–3 (high school)

Stephen Lee (born c. 1971) is an American college football coach. He is the offensive coordinator for the University of Mary Hardin–Baylor, a position he has held since 2025, and from 2016 to 2021. He was the head football coach for Irion County High School in 1998 and Cisco College in 2023. He also coached for Western New Mexico, Howard Payne, Brenham High School, West Texas A&M, Abilene Christian, and Tarleton State. He played college football for Angelo State as a quarterback and fullback.

== Personal life ==
Lee's son, Jarrett Lee, played college football for LSU as a quarterback.

== Head coaching record ==
=== Junior college ===
| Year | Team | Overall | Conference | Standing | Bowl/playoffs |
|---|---|---|---|---|---|
Cisco Wranglers (Southwest Junior College Football Conference) (2023)
| 2023 | Cisco | 4–4 | 3–4 | 6th | |
| Cisco: | | 4–4 | 3–4 | | |
| Total: | | 4–4 | | | |

=== High school ===
| Year | Team | Overall | Conference | Standing | Bowl/playoffs |
|---|---|---|---|---|---|
Irion County Hornets () (1998)
| 1998 | Irion County | 7–3 | | T–1st | |
| Irion County: | | 7–3 | | | |
| Total: | | 7–3 | | | |
National championship Conference title Conference division title or championship game berth
