= Larry Harmon (American football) =

American football coach

Current position
- Title: Head coach
- Team: Mary Hardin–Baylor
- Conference: ASC
- Record: 42–14

Biographical details
- Education: South Dakota State University (1995)

Playing career
- 1992–1995: South Dakota State
- Position: Strong safety

Coaching career (HC unless noted)
- 1996: South Dakota State (GA)
- 1997–1998: Northwest Missouri State (GA)
- 1999–2001: Mary Hardin–Baylor (S)
- 2002–2021: Mary Hardin–Baylor (DC)
- 2022–present: Mary Hardin–Baylor

Head coaching record
- Overall: 42–14
- Tournaments: 6–2 (NCAA D-III playoffs)

Accomplishments and honors

Championships
- 3 ASC (2022, 2025, 2026)

Awards
- AFCA Region 3 Coach of the Year (2022)

Larry Harmon is an American college football coach. He is the head football coach for the University of Mary Hardin–Baylor, a position he has held since 2022. He previously was the defensive coordinator for Mary Hardin–Baylor. He also coached for Northwest Missouri State and South Dakota State. He played football for South Dakota State as a strong safety.

== Head coaching record ==
Year	Team	Overall	Conference	Standing	Bowl/playoffs	AFCA^{#}
Mary Hardin–Baylor Crusaders (American Southwest Conference) (2022–present)
2022	Mary Hardin–Baylor	12–2	8–0	1st	L NCAA Division III Semifinal	3
2023	Mary Hardin–Baylor	6–4	5–1	2nd		
2024	Mary Hardin–Baylor	8–4	4–2	2nd	L NCAA Division III Quarterfinal	
2025	Mary Hardin–Baylor	7–3	5–1	T–1st		
2026	Mary Hardin–Baylor	9–1	5–0	1st		
Mary Hardin–Baylor:		42–14	27–4			
Total:		42–14				
National championship Conference title Conference division title or championship game berth
