= Mary Hardin–Baylor Crusaders football =

NCAA Division III college football team

- First season: 1998; 28 years ago
- Athletic director: Randy Mann
- Head coach: Larry Harmon; 4th season, 33–13 (.717)
- Location: Belton, Texas
- Stadium: Crusader Stadium (capacity: 7,671)
- Conference: ASC
- Colors: Purple and gold
- All-time record: 264 (Note: In June 2020, Mary Hardin–Baylor vacated a total of 26 wins and 1 loss from the 2016 and 2017 seasons. The Crusaders finished the 2016 season with an overall record of 15–0 and a conference mark of 6–0. 13 wins, including 5 conference wins and 5 wins in the NCAA Division III playoffs, and the NCAA Division III title from the 2016 season was vacated. Mary Hardin–Baylor finished the 2017 season with an overall record of 14–1 with a conference mark of 9–0. 13 wins and 1 loss, including 8 conference wins and 4 wins and 1 loss in the NCAA Division III playoffs from the 2017 season were vacated.)–52 ()

NCAA Division III championships
- 2016 (vacated), 2018, 2021

Conference championships
- ASC: 2002, 2003, 2005, 2006, 2007, 2008, 2009, 2010, 2011, 2012, 2013, 2014, 2015, 2016 (vacated), 2017 (vacated), 2018, 2019, 2020, 2021, 2022, 2025
- Website: cruathletics.com

The Mary Hardin–Baylor Crusaders football team represents the University of Mary Hardin–Baylor in college football in the National Collegiate Athletic Association (NCAA) at the NCAA Division III level. The Crusaders are members of the American Southwest Conference (ASC), fielding its team in the ASC since 1998. The Crusaders play their home games at Crusader Stadium in Belton, Texas.

Their head coach is Larry Harmon, who took over the position for the 2022 season after serving the previous twenty as the team's defensive coordinator under Pete Fredenburg.

Mary Hardin–Baylor has won three NCAA Division III football championships: 2016, 2018, and 2021. The 2016 championship was vacated and 29 wins were vacated due to ineligible players.

== Conference affiliations ==
- American Southwest Conference (1998–present)

== List of head coaches ==
=== Key ===
Key to symbols in coaches list
General		Overall		Conference		Postseason (Note: Although the first Rose Bowl Game was played in 1902, it has been continuously played since the 1916 game, and is recognized as the oldest bowl game by the NCAA. "—" indicates any season prior to 1916 when postseason games were not played.)	
No.	Order of coaches (Note: A running total of the number of head coaches, with coaches who served separate tenures being counted only once. Interim head coaches are represented with "Int" and are not counted in the running total. "—" indicates the team played but either without a coach or no coach is on record. "X" indicates an interim year without play.)	GC	Games coached	CW	Conference wins	PW	Postseason wins
DC	Division championships	OW	Overall wins	CL	Conference losses	PL	Postseason losses
CC	Conference championships	OL	Overall losses	CT	Conference ties	PT	Postseason ties
NC	National championships	OT	Overall ties (Note: Overtime rules in college football were introduced in 1996, making ties impossible in the period since.)	C%	Conference winning percentage		
†	Elected to the College Football Hall of Fame	O%	Overall winning percentage (Note: When computing the win–loss percentage, a tie counts as half a win and half a loss.)				

=== Coaches ===
List of head football coaches showing season(s) coached, overall records and conference records
No.	Name	Season(s)	GC	OW	OL	O%	CW	CL	C%
1	Pete Fredenburg	1998–2021	270	231	39	0.856	154	16	0.906
2	Larry Harmon	2022–present	46	33	13	0.717	22	4	0.846

== Year-by-year results ==
National champions	Conference champions	Bowl game berth	Playoff berth

Season	Year	Head coach	Association	Division	Conference	Record					Postseason	Final ranking
Season	Year	Head coach	Association	Division	Conference	Overall		Conference			Postseason	Final ranking
Season	Year	Head coach	Association	Division	Conference	Win	Loss	Finish	Win	Loss	Postseason	Final ranking
Mary Hardin–Baylor Crusaders
1998	1998	Pete Fredenburg	NCAA	Division III	ASC	3	7	T–5th	2	5	—	—
1999	1999	Pete Fredenburg	NCAA	Division III	ASC	4	6	T–4th	3	4	—	—
2000	2000	Pete Fredenburg	NCAA	Division III	ASC	9	1	2nd	8	1	—	—
2001	2001	Pete Fredenburg	NCAA	Division III	ASC	8	2	2nd	7	1	L NCAA Division III First Round	—
2002	2002	Pete Fredenburg	NCAA	Division III	ASC	10	1	1st	9	0	L NCAA Division III First Round	—
2003	2003	Pete Fredenburg	NCAA	Division III	ASC	9	1	T–1st	8	1	—	15
2004	2004	Pete Fredenburg	NCAA	Division III	ASC	13	2	2nd	8	1	L NCAA Division III Championship	2
2005	2005	Pete Fredenburg	NCAA	Division III	ASC	9	2	1st	7	1	L NCAA Division III Second Round	11
2006	2006	Pete Fredenburg	NCAA	Division III	ASC	10	3	1st	8	0	L NCAA Division III Quarterfinal	8
2007	2007	Pete Fredenburg	NCAA	Division III	ASC	12	2	1st	8	0	L NCAA Division III Semifinal	3
2008	2008	Pete Fredenburg	NCAA	Division III	ASC	12	2	1st	8	0	L NCAA Division III Semifinal	3
2009	2009	Pete Fredenburg	NCAA	Division III	ASC	10	2	T–1st	7	1	L NCAA Division III Second Round	7
2010	2010	Pete Fredenburg	NCAA	Division III	ASC	12	1	1st	8	0	L NCAA Division III Quarterfinal	5
2011	2011	Pete Fredenburg	NCAA	Division III	ASC	12	1	1st	8	0	L NCAA Division III Quarterfinal	5
2012	2012	Pete Fredenburg	NCAA	Division III	ASC	13	1	1st	7	0	L NCAA Division III Semifinal	5
2013	2013	Pete Fredenburg	NCAA	Division III	ASC	13	1	1st	6	0	L NCAA Division III Semifinal	2
2014	2014	Pete Fredenburg	NCAA	Division III	ASC	11	1	1st	5	0	L NCAA Division III Second Round	6
2015	2015	Pete Fredenburg	NCAA	Division III	ASC	11	2	T–1st	4	1	L NCAA Division III Quarterfinal	7
2016	2016	Pete Fredenburg	NCAA	Division III	ASC	2	0	1st	1	0	W (vacated) NCAA Division III Championship	1
2017	2017	Pete Fredenburg	NCAA	Division III	ASC	1	0	1st	1	0	L (vacated) NCAA Division III Championship	2
2018	2018	Pete Fredenburg	NCAA	Division III	ASC	15	0	1st	9	0	W NCAA Division III Championship	1
2019	2019	Pete Fredenburg	NCAA	Division III	ASC	12	1	1st	9	0	L NCAA Division III Quarterfinal	6
2020–21	2019	Pete Fredenburg	NCAA	Division III	ASC	5	0	1st (East)	4	0	—	—
2021	2021	Pete Fredenburg	NCAA	Division III	ASC	15	0	1st	9	0	W NCAA Division III Championship	1
2022	2022	Larry Harmon	NCAA	Division III	ASC	12	2	1st	8	0	L NCAA Division III Semifinal	3
2023	2023	Larry Harmon	NCAA	Division III	ASC	6	4	2nd	5	1	—	—
2024	2024	Larry Harmon	NCAA	Division III	ASC	8	4	2nd	4	2	L NCAA Division III Quarterfinal	—
2025	2025	Larry Harmon	NCAA	Division III	ASC	7	3	T–1st	5	1	—	—

== Crusader Stadium ==
Crusader Stadium
- Location: 905 University Dr; Belton, TX 76513
- Owner: University of Mary Hardin–Baylor
- Operator: University of Mary Hardin–Baylor
- Capacity: 9,118
- Surface: FieldTurf

Construction
- Groundbreaking: 2012
- Opened: 2013
- Cost: $20 million
- Architect: Turner Construction

Tenant
- Mary Hardin–Baylor Crusaders (NCAA) (1988–present)

Crusader Stadium is a football stadium in Belton, Texas, with a seating capacity of 9,118. It is home to the University of Mary Hardin–Baylor Crusaders football team. The facility opened in 2013 and replaced Tiger Field.

It cost $20 million to build and was designed by Turner Construction who designed the new Yankee Stadium and Target Field. The stadium's construction was a part of the university's $100 million campus improvements which included a new nursing school, banquet hall, and arts complex.

In 2021, the McLane Family gifted funds to replace the stadium's video board with a 1,000 square-foot screen.
